= 2019 Atlantic Coast Conference men's soccer season =

- League: NCAA Division I
- Sport: Soccer
- Duration: August 26, 2019 – November 1, 2019
- Teams: 12

2020 MLS SuperDraft
- Top draft pick: Robbie Robinson
- Picked by: Inter Miami CF, 1st overall

Regular season
- Season champions: Atlantic:Clemson; Coastal:Virginia
- Runners-up: Atlantic:Wake Forest; Coastal:Pittsburgh
- Season MVP: Offensive: Robbie Robinson; Midfielder: Joe Bell; Defensive:Malick Mbaye
- Top scorer: Robbie Robinson – Clemson

ACC tournament
- Champions: Virginia
- Runners-up: Clemson
- Finals MVP: (United States) Henry Kessler

ACC men's soccer seasons
- ← 2018 2020 →

2019 ACC men's soccer standings
	Conf.					Overall
Team	W		L		T	W		L		T
Atlantic
No. 5 Clemson +	6	–	1	–	1	18	–	2	–	2
No. 3 Wake Forest +	6	–	2	–	0	16	–	5	–	2
NC State +	3	–	4	–	1	9	–	7	–	3
No. 20 Louisville +	3	–	4	–	1	10	–	8	–	2
Boston College +	2	–	4	–	2	9	–	6	–	3
Syracuse +	2	–	4	–	2	8	–	7	–	4
Coastal
No. 2 Virginia ‡	6	–	1	–	1	21	–	1	–	2
Pittsburgh +	4	–	3	–	1	10	–	8	–	2
Notre Dame +	3	–	5	–	0	10	–	8	–	1
North Carolina	3	–	5	–	0	7	–	8	–	3
No. 13 Virginia Tech +	2	–	4	–	2	10	–	6	–	3
Duke	2	–	5	–	1	7	–	9	–	2
‡ – 2019 ACC Tournament champion + – Invited to the 2019 NCAA tournament; As of 17 December 2019; Rankings from United Soccer Coaches; Source:The ACC

The 2019 Atlantic Coast Conference men's soccer season was the 66th season of men's varsity soccer in the conference.

The Wake Forest Demon Deacons are the defending champions of the Atlantic Conference and the North Carolina are the defending champions of the Coastal Conference. Wake Forest are the defending ACC tournament champions.

== Changes from 2018 ==
After the 2018 season, Louisville Cardinals coach Ken Lolla resigned after 13 years and a 155–77–39 record with the team. He was replaced by John Michael Hayden on December 27, 2018

== Teams ==
=== Stadiums and locations ===
Atlantic Division
Team	Stadium	Capacity
Boston College Eagles	Newton Soccer Complex	2,500
Clemson Tigers	Riggs Field	6,500
Louisville Cardinals	Lynn Stadium	5,300
NC State Wolfpack	Dail Soccer Field	3,000
Syracuse Orange	SU Soccer Stadium	5,000
Wake Forest Demon Deacons	Spry Stadium	3,000

Coastal Division
Team	Stadium	Capacity
Duke Blue Devils	Koskinen Stadium	7,000
North Carolina Tar Heels	Fetzer Field	5,025
Notre Dame Fighting Irish	Alumni Stadium	2,500
Pittsburgh Panthers	Ambrose Urbanic Field	735
Virginia Cavaliers	Klöckner Stadium	8,000
Virginia Tech Hokies	Thompson Field	2,500

1. Florida State, Georgia Tech and Miami do not sponsor men's soccer

=== Personnel ===
Team	Head coach	Years at school	Overall record	Record at school	ACC record
Boston College	Ed Kelly	33	321–248–70	281–235–65	109–112–30
Clemson	Mike Noonan	9	305–174–41	92–61–28	35–28–12
Duke	John Kerr Jr.	12	181–129–38	100–70–25	38–39–14
Louisville	John Michael Hayden	1	0–0–0	0–0–0	0–0–0
North Carolina	Carlos Somoano	9	121–29–22	121–29–22	43–10–13
NC State	George Kiefer	3	104–27–23	122–40–30	5–7–4
Notre Dame	Chad Riley	2	11–7–3	11–7–3	4–3–1
Pittsburgh	Jay Vidovich	4	225–87–31	18–33–4	4–19–2
Syracuse	Ian McIntyre	10	192–125–54	85–61–24	16–25–11
Virginia	George Gelnovatch	24	320–128–57	320–128–57	83–58–30
Virginia Tech	Mike Brizendine	10	71–91–23	71–91–23	16–53–15
Wake Forest	Bobby Muuss	5	148–66–32	73–10–8	25–2–5

Notes

- Records shown are prior to the 2019 season
- Years at school includes the 2019 season
- ACC records include only years with current school.

== Preseason ==
=== Hermann Trophy ===
Prior to the season five ACC men's soccer players were selected to the MAC Hermann Trophy watch list.

Player	Class	Position	School
Daniele Proch	Senior	FW	Duke
Emil Elveroth	Junior	FW	Louisville
David Loera	Junior	MF	NC State
Mauricio Pineda	Senior	MF	North Carolina
Bruno Lapa	Senior	MF	Wake Forest

=== Preseason poll ===
The 2019 ACC preseason poll was announced on August 19, 2019. The league's 12 head coaches voted North Carolina as the preseason favorite, with 9 of the 12 votes. Full results of the preseason poll are shown below:

Atlantic
Predicted finish	Team	Votes (1st place)
1	Wake Forest	64 (9)
2	Louisville	48 (1)
3	Syracuse	42 (1)
4	NC State	38
5	Clemson	36 (1)
6	Boston College	18

Coastal
Predicted finish	Team	Votes (1st place)
1	North Carolina	65 (10)
2	Virginia	46 (1)
3	Duke	45 (1)
4	Virginia Tech	38
5	Notre Dame	36
6	Pittsburgh	16

Media poll (ACC Championship)
Rank	Team	Votes
1	North Carolina	9
2	Duke	1
2	Virginia	1
2	Wake Forest	1

=== Preseason national polls ===
Preseason polls will come out in August 2019. CollegeSoccerNews.com and Hero Sports use a Top 30 ranking throughout the season, while United Soccer, Soccer America, and Top Drawer Soccer use a Top 25 ranking throughout the season.

	United; Soccer	CSN	Soccer; America	TopDrawer; Soccer
Boston College				
Clemson	RV	RV		
Duke	10	8	8	10
Louisville	14	15	16	9
NC State	RV	25	25	22
North Carolina	6	7	1	7
Notre Dame	9	14		16
Pittsburgh				
Syracuse		RV		RV
Virginia	12	13	9	15
Virginia Tech	16	19	14	19
Wake Forest	4	1	5	3

== Regular season ==
Index to colors and formatting
ACC member won
ACC member lost
ACC member tied
ACC teams in **bold**

All times Eastern time.

=== Week 1 (Aug. 26 – Sept. 1) ===
Date	Time (ET)	Visiting team	Home team	Site	Result	Attendance
August 29	2:30 p.m.	Quinnipiac	**Boston College**	Newton Soccer Complex • Chestnut Hill, MA	**W** 2–0	0
August 30	4:00 p.m.	**Syracuse**	No. 13 Georgetown	Shaw Field • Washington, D.C.	**L** 1–3	1,121
August 30	6:00 p.m.	No. 15 UCF	No. 4 **Wake Forest**	Spry Stadium • Winston–Salem, NC	**W** 2–1	1,578
August 30	7:00 p.m.	Loyola (MD)	**NC State**	Dail Soccer Stadium • Raleigh, NC	**W** 2–1	942
August 30	7:00 p.m.	South Carolina	**Clemson**	Riggs Field • Clemson, SC	**W** 4–1	3,382
August 30	7:30 p.m.	Cleveland State	No. 14 **Louisville**	Lynn Stadium • Louisville, KY	**T** 2–2 (2OT)	1,115
August 30	7:30 p.m.	Creighton	No. 6 **North Carolina**	Fetzer Field • Chapel Hill, NC	**T** 2–2 (2OT)	2,417
August 30	7:30 p.m.	Furman	No. 10 **Duke**	Koskinen Stadium • Durham, NC	**W** 1–0	1,173
August 30	8:00 p.m.	Pacific	No. 12 **Virginia**	Klöckner Stadium • Charlottesville, VA	**W** 2–0	3,770
August 30	8:00 p.m.	**Pittsburgh**	No. 2 Indiana	Bill Armstrong Stadium • Bloomington, IN	**L** 2–3 (2OT)	2,847
August 30	10:00 p.m.	No. 16 **Virginia Tech**	Loyola (CA)	Sullivan Field • Los Angeles, CA	**W** 2–1	0
August 31	7:00 p.m.	No. 9 **Notre Dame**	Saint Louis	Hermann Stadium • St. Louis, MO	**W** 3–2	5,942
September 1	2:30 p.m.	Cal State Bakersfield	No. 10 **Duke**	Koskinen Stadium • Durham, NC	**W** 2–1	547
September 1	4:00 p.m.	**Boston College**	Boston	Nickerson Field • Boston, MA	**W** 1–0	4,415
September 1	5:00 p.m.	Northwestern	**Pittsburgh**	Bill Armstrong Stadium • Bloomington, IN	**L** 0–1	0
September 1	7:00 p.m.	Creighton	No. 4 **Wake Forest**	Spry Stadium • Winston–Salem, NC	**W** 1–0	2,089
September 1	7:00 p.m.	St. John's	**NC State**	Dail Soccer Stadium • Raleigh, NC	**L** 0–1 (2OT)	764
September 1	7:30 p.m.	No. 15 UCF	No. 6 **North Carolina**	Fetzer Field • Chapel Hill, NC	**L** 1–2	814
September 1	10:00 p.m.	No. 16 **Virginia Tech**	UC Santa Barbara	Harder Stadium • Santa Barbara, CA	**W** 3–1	1,500

Players of the week:

Offensive		Defensive	
Player	Team	Player	Team
Irakoze Donasiyano	Virginia	Michael DeShields	Wake Forest

=== Week 2 (Sept. 2 – Sept. 8) ===
Date	Time (ET)	Visiting team	Home team	Site	Result	Attendance
September 2	5:00 p.m.	Detroit Mercy	**Clemson**	Riggs Field • Clemson, SC	**W** 8–0	1,267
September 2	7:00 p.m.	Binghamton	**Syracuse**	SU Soccer Stadium • Syracuse, NY	**W** 3–1	1,169
September 2	7:00 p.m.	No. 12 **Virginia**	No. 1 Maryland	Audi Field • Washington, D.C.	**W** 2–0	1,884
September 3	7:30 p.m.	No. 9 Kentucky	**Louisville**	Lynn Stadium • Louisville, KY	**W** 3–0	2,389
September 6	4:00 p.m.	Princeton	No. 5 **Duke**	Koskinen Stadium • Durham, NC	**W** 4–0	0
September 6	4:00 p.m.	No. 10 **Virginia Tech**	Loyloa (MD)	Sentara Park • Harrisonburg, VA	**W** 2–1	0
September 6	6:00 p.m.	Rhode Island	**Boston College**	Newton Soccer Complex • Chestnut Hill, MA	**W** 2–1	351
September 6	7:00 p.m.	Dartmouth	No. 1 **Wake Forest**	Spry Stadium • Winston–Salem, NC	**W** 3–1	0
September 6	7:00 p.m.	Seattle	No. 11 **Notre Dame**	Alumni Stadium • Notre Dame, IN	**W** 4–2	686
September 6	7:00 p.m.	Yale	**Syracuse**	SU Soccer Stadium • Syracuse, NY	**T** 1–1 (2OT)	1,765
September 6	7:30 p.m.	Harvard	No. 20 **North Carolina**	Fetzer Field • Chapel Hill, NC	**W** 6–0	1,122
September 6	7:30 p.m.	Liberty	**Pittsburgh**	Ambrose Urbanic Field • Pittsburgh, PA	**W** 3–0	906
September 6	7:30 p.m.	**Louisville**	Florida Atlantic	FAU Soccer Stadium • Boca Raton, FL	**W** 3–0	229
September 6	7:30 p.m.	UNC Greensboro	No. 19 **Clemson**	Riggs Field • Clemson, SC	**W** 2–1	2,718
September 6	8:00 p.m.	Longwood	**NC State**	Dail Soccer Stadium • Raleigh, NC	**W** 1–0	1,494
September 7	7:00 p.m.	High Point	No. 7 **Virginia**	Klöckner Stadium • Charlottesville, VA	**W** 1–0	1,578
September 8	4:00 p.m.	No. 5 **Duke**	Harvard	Koskinen Stadium • Durham, NC	**W** 3–0	993
September 8	4:00 p.m.	No. 10 **Virginia Tech**	Hofstra	Sentara Park • Harrisonburg, VA	**W** 4–3	0
September 8	7:00 p.m.	Denver	No. 11 **Notre Dame**	Alumni Stadium • Notre Dame, IN	**W** 1–0	641
September 8	7:00 p.m.	No. 22 New Hampshire	**Syracuse**	SU Soccer Stadium • Syracuse, NY	**T** 2–2 (2OT)	721

Players of the week:

Offensive		Defensive	
Player	Team	Player	Team
Daniele Porch	Duke	Jake Gelnovatch	Louisville
Daniele Porch	Duke	Colin Shutler	Virginia

=== Week 3 (Sept. 9 – Sept. 15) ===
Date	Time (ET)	Visiting team	Home team	Site	Result	Attendance
September 9	7:00 p.m.	Delaware	**Pittsburgh**	Ambrose Urbanic Field • Pittsburgh, PA	**T** 3–3 (2OT)	309
September 9	7:00 p.m.	Houston Baptist	No. 1 **Wake Forest**	Spry Stadium • Winston-Salem, NC	**W** 4–0	1,187
September 9	7:00 p.m.	No. 20 **North Carolina**	UNC Greensboro	UNCG Soccer Stadium • Greensboro, NC	**W** 1–0	1,085
September 9	7:00 p.m.	USC Upstate	No. 19 **Clemson**	Riggs Field • Clemson, SC	**W** 7–0	1,101
September 9	7:30 p.m.	**Louisville**	South Florida	Corbett Soccer Stadium • Tampa, FL	**L** 0–2	702
September 10	7:00 p.m.	**Boston College**	Holy Cross	Smith Stadium • Worcester, MA	**W** 3–2	0
September 10	7:00 p.m.	**NC State**	William & Mary	Albert–Daly Field • Williamsburg, VA	**T** 1–1 (2OT)	226
September 13	6:00 p.m.	No. 6 **Virginia**	No. 2 **Duke**	Koskinen Stadium • Durham, NC	**UVA** 3–1	1,092
September 13	7:00 p.m.	No. 13 **Clemson**	No. 10 **Notre Dame**	Alumni Stadium • Notre Dame, IN	**CLEM** 4–2	1,078
September 13	7:00 p.m.	No. 20 **Louisville**	**Syracuse**	SU Soccer Stadium • Syracuse, NY	**T** 0–0 (2OT)	1,756
September 13	7:00 p.m.	No. 18 **North Carolina**	No. 9 **Virginia Tech**	Thompson Field • Blacksburg, VA	**UNC** 3–1	2,012
September 13	7:00 p.m.	No. 1 **Wake Forest**	**Pittsburgh**	Ambrose Urbanic Field • Pittsburgh, PA	**WAKE** 2–0	913
September 14	7:00 p.m.	**Boston College**	**NC State**	Dail Soccer Stadium • Raleigh, NC	**NCST** 1–0	1,250

Players of the week:

Offensive		Defensive	
Player	Team	Player	Team
Kimarni Smith	Clemson	Andrew Pannenberg	Wake Forest

=== Week 4 (Sept. 16 – Sept. 22) ===
Date	Time (ET)	Visiting team	Home team	Site	Result	Attendance
September 16	7:00 p.m.	Akron	**Pittsburgh**	Ambrose Urbanic Field • Pittsburgh, PA	**W** 1–0	576
September 16	7:00 p.m.	No. 22 SMU	No. 2 **Duke**	Koskinen Stadium • Durham, NC	**L** 0–2	237
September 17	7:00 p.m.	College of Charleston	**NC State**	Dail Soccer Stadium • Raleigh, NC	**W** 4–1	731
September 17	7:00 p.m.	Cornell	**Syracuse**	SU Soccer Stadium • Syracuse, NY	**W** 3–2 (OT)	521
September 17	7:00 p.m.	Davidson	No. 11 **North Carolina**	Fetzer Field • Chapel Hill, NC	**T** 0–0 (2OT)	1,411
September 17	7:00 p.m.	Fordham	No. 7 **Clemson**	Riggs Field • Clemson, SC	**W** 3–2 (OT)	1,435
September 17	7:00 p.m.	Grand Canyon	No. 17 **Virginia Tech**	Thompson Field • Blacksburg, VA	**W** 4–0	712
September 17	7:00 p.m.	No. 16 **Notre Dame**	No. 4 Indiana	Bill Armstrong Stadium • Bloomington, IN	**T** 1–1 (2OT)	2,392
September 17	7:00 p.m.	Radford	No. 5 **Virginia**	Klöckner Stadium • Charlottesville, VA	**W** 1–0	1,043
September 17	7:00 p.m.	No. 1 **Wake Forest**	James Madison	Sentara Park • Harrisonburg, VA	**L** 0–1	1,453
September 20	5:00 p.m.	**Pittsburgh**	**Boston College**	Newton Soccer Complex • Chestnut Hill, MA	**PITT** 2–0	344
September 20	6:00 p.m.	No. 16 **Notre Dame**	No. 11 **North Carolina**	Fetzer Field • Chapel Hill, NC	**UNC** 2–0	2,375
September 20	7:00 p.m.	**NC State**	No. 5 **Virginia**	Klöckner Stadium • Charlottesville, VA	**UVA** 2–0	3,858
September 20	7:30 p.m.	No. 17 **Virginia Tech**	**Louisville**	Lynn Stadium • Louisville, KY	**LOU** 2–1	1,368
September 20	8:00 p.m.	No. 15 **Duke**	No. 7 **Clemson**	Riggs Field • Clemson, SC	**CLEM** 3–1	2,452
September 21	7:30 p.m.	**Syracuse**	No. 1 **Wake Forest**	Spry Stadium • Winston–Salem, NC	**WAKE** 1–0	3,143

Players of the week:

Offensive		Defensive	
Player	Team	Player	Team
Cherif Dieye	Louisville	Matt Constant	North Carolina

=== Week 5 (Sept. 23 – Sept. 29) ===
Date	Time (ET)	Visiting team	Home team	Site	Result	Attendance
September 23	7:00 p.m.	Western Michigan	No. 5 **Virginia**	Klöckner Stadium • Charlottesville, VA	**W** 1–0 (OT)	957
September 24	4:00 p.m.	UMass	**Boston College**	Newton Soccer Complex • Chestnut Hill, MA	**W** 1–0	180
September 24	7:00 p.m.	No. 4 **Clemson**	Furman	Stone Stadium • Greenville, SC	**W** 2–0	2,712
September 24	7:00 p.m.	No. 2 Georgetown	No. 17 **Louisville**	Lynn Stadium • Louisville, KY	**W** 1–0 (2OT)	1,053
September 24	7:00 p.m.	No. 21 **Notre Dame**	Michigan State	DeMartin Soccer Complex • East Lansing, MI	**W** 1–0	616
September 24	7:00 p.m.	**Syracuse**	Colgate	Beyer-Small '76 Field • Hamilton, NY	**W** 1–0	425
September 24	7:00 p.m.	No. 7 **Wake Forest**	Davidson	Alumni Soccer Stadium • Davidson, NC	**W** 1–0	849
September 27	1:00 p.m.	**Boston College**	No. 18 **Virginia Tech**	Thompson Field • Blacksburg, VA	**T** 2–2 (2OT)	1,232
September 27	7:00 p.m.	**Duke**	No. 14 **North Carolina**	Fetzer Field • Chapel Hill, NC	**DUKE** 3–2	2,244
September 27	7:00 p.m.	**Pittsburgh**	**Syracuse**	SU Soccer Stadium • Syracuse, NY	**T** 1–1 (2OT)	1,706
September 27	7:30 p.m.	**NC State**	No. 17 **Louisville**	Lynn Stadium • Louisville, KY	**NCST** 2–1	1,057
September 28	11:00 a.m.	No. 3 **Virginia**	No. 21 **Notre Dame**	Alumni Stadium • Notre Dame, IN	**UVA** 1–0	646
September 28	7:00 p.m.	No. 4 **Clemson**	No. 7 **Wake Forest**	Spry Stadium • Winston–Salem, NC	**WAKE** 3–2 (OT)	4,126

Players of the week:

Offensive		Defensive	
Player	Team	Player	Team
Justin McMaster	Wake Forest	Colin Shutler	Virginia

=== Week 6 (Sept. 30 – Oct. 6) ===
Date	Time (ET)	Visiting team	Home team	Site	Result	Attendance
September 30	7:00 p.m.	Denver	**Pittsburgh**	Ambrose Urbanic Field • Pittsburgh, PA	**W** 3–2 (2OT)	279
October 1	4:00 p.m.	Merrimack	**Boston College**	Newton Soccer Complex • Chestnut Hill, MA	**T** 0–0 (2OT)	181
October 1	7:00 p.m.	Belmont	No. 24 **Louisville**	Lynn Stadium • Louisville, KY	**W** 3–0	851
October 1	7:00 p.m.	No. 6 **Clemson**	College of Charleston	CofC Soccer Stadium • Charleston, SC	**W** 3–0	1,544
October 1	7:00 p.m.	DePaul	**Notre Dame**	Alumni Stadium • Notre Dame, IN	**W** 1–0	404
October 1	7:00 p.m.	Gardner–Webb	No. 22 **Virginia Tech**	Thompson Field • Blacksburg, VA	**W** 4–0	409
October 1	7:00 p.m.	George Washington	No. 1 **Virginia**	Klöckner Stadium • Charlottesville, VA	**W** 3–0	1,160
October 1	7:00 p.m.	UNC Wilmington	No. 20 **North Carolina**	Fetzer Field • Chapel Hill, NC	**W** 2–0	649
October 1	7:00 p.m.	Wright State	No. 18 **Duke**	Koskinen Stadium • Durham, NC	**T** 2–2 (2OT)	422
October 4	6:00 p.m.	**Notre Dame**	**NC State**	Dail Soccer Stadium • Raleigh, NC	**NCST** 2–0	1,211
October 4	7:00 p.m.	No. 24 **Louisville**	No. 1 **Virginia**	Klöckner Stadium • Charlottesville, VA	**UVA** 2–0	3,008
October 4	7:00 p.m.	No. 20 **North Carolina**	**Pittsburgh**	Ambrose Urbanic Field • Pittsburgh, PA	**UNC** 2–1	704
October 4	7:00 p.m.	**Syracuse**	No. 18 **Duke**	Koskinen Stadium • Durham, NC	**DUKE** 4–0	759
October 4	7:00 p.m.	No. 3 **Wake Forest**	**Boston College**	Newton Soccer Complex • Chestnut Hill, MA	**BC** 2–1	523
October 5	7:00 p.m.	No. 22 **Virginia Tech**	No. 6 **Clemson**	Riggs Field • Clemson, SC	**T** 0–0 (2OT)	1,639

Players of the week:

Offensive		Defensive	
Player	Team	Player	Team
Stefan Sigurdarson	Boston College	Joe Kellett	Boston College
Stefan Sigurdarson	Boston College	Robin Afamefuna	Virginia

=== Week 7 (Oct. 7 – Oct. 13) ===
Date	Time (ET)	Visiting team	Home team	Site	Result	Attendance
October 7	7:00 p.m.	Howard	**Pittsburgh**	Ambrose Urbanic Field • Pittsburgh, PA	**W** 6–0	207
October 8	4:00 p.m.	Northeastern	**Boston College**	Newton Soccer Complex • Chestnut Hill, MA	**W** 3–0	206
October 8	7:00 p.m.	ETSU	No. 20 **NC State**	Dail Soccer Stadium • Raleigh, NC	**W** 1–0	389
October 8	7:00 p.m.	High Point	No. 6 **Wake Forest**	Spry Stadium • Winston-Salem, NC	**W** 5–0	1,377
October 8	7:00 p.m.	Purdue Fort Wayne	**Notre Dame**	Alumni Stadium • Notre Dame, IN	**W** 8–0	257
October 8	7:00 p.m.	West Virginia	No. 18 **North Carolina**	Fetzer Field • Chapel Hill, NC	**W** 3–1	647
October 11	6:00 p.m.	No. 21 **Duke**	**Notre Dame**	Alumni Stadium • Notre Dame, IN	**ND** 1–0	748
October 11	7:00 p.m.	**Louisville**	No. 11 **Clemson**	Riggs Field • Clemson, SC	**CLEM** 4–0	1,700
October 11	7:00 p.m.	No. 1 **Virginia**	**Boston College**	Newton Soccer Complex • Chestnut Hill, MA	**WAKE** 3–1	242
October 11	7:00 p.m.	No. 22 **Virginia Tech**	**Pittsburgh**	Ambrose Urbanic Field • Pittsburgh, PA	**PITT** 3–1	621
October 11	7:00 p.m.	No. 6 **Wake Forest**	No. 20 **NC State**	Dail Soccer Stadium • Raleigh, NC	**T** 1–1 (2OT)	1,056
October 12	7:00 p.m.	**Syracuse**	No. 18 **North Carolina**	Fetzer Field • Chapel Hill, NC	**CUSE** 4–3	876

Players of the week:

Offensive		Defensive	
Player	Team	Player	Team
Ryan Raposo	Syracuse	Felicien Dumas	Notre Dame

=== Week 8 (Oct. 14 – Oct. 20) ===
Date	Time (ET)	Visiting team	Home team	Site	Result	Attendance
October 15	7:00 p.m.	Connecticut	**Syracuse**	SU Soccer Stadium • Syracuse, NY	**W** 1–0	342
October 15	7:00 p.m.	**Duke**	Elon	Rudd Field • Elon, NC	**L** 2–3	724
October 15	7:00 p.m.	No. 18 James Madison	No. 1 **Virginia**	Klöckner Stadium • Charlottesville, VA	**W** 1–0	1,809
October 15	7:00 p.m.	No. 23 **NC State**	South Carolina	Stone Stadium • Columbia, SC	**T** 0–0 (2OT)	1,506
October 15	7:00 p.m.	Northern Kentucky	**Louisville**	Lynn Stadium • Louisville, KY	**W** 1–0 (OT)	1,210
October 15	7:00 p.m.	**Pittsburgh**	Penn State	Jeffrey Field • State College, PA	**L** 1–3	509
October 15	7:00 p.m.	William & Mary	No. 4 **Wake Forest**	Spry Stadium • Winston-Salem, NC	**W** 5–0	877
October 18	5:30 p.m.	**Notre Dame**	**Virginia Tech**	Thompson Field • Blacksburg, VA	**VT** 2–1	822
October 18	6:00 p.m.	No. 19 **North Carolina**	No. 4 **Wake Forest**	Spry Stadium • Winston–Salem, NC	**WAKE** 1–0	3,315
October 18	7:00 p.m.	No. 23 **NC State**	**Duke**	Koskinen Stadium • Durham, NC	**T** 0–0 (2OT)	918
October 18	7:00 p.m.	**Pittsburgh**	No. 1 **Virginia**	Klöckner Stadium • Charlottesville, VA	**PITT** 2–0	3,201
October 18	7:30 p.m.	**Boston College**	**Louisville**	Lynn Stadium • Louisville, KY	**LOU** 3–2 (2OT)	2,643
October 19	7:00 p.m.	No. 8 **Clemson**	**Syracuse**	SU Soccer Stadium • Syracuse, NY	**CLEM** 7–4	1,342

Players of the week:

Offensive		Defensive	
Player	Team	Player	Team
Robbie Robinson	Clemson	Andrew Pannenberg (2)	Wake Forest

=== Week 9 (Oct. 21 – Oct. 27) ===
Date	Time (ET)	Visiting team	Home team	Site	Result	Attendance
October 22	4:00 p.m.	SUNY Morrisville	**Syracuse**	SU Soccer Stadium • Syracuse, NY	**W** 11–0	64
October 22	7:00 p.m.	Elon	**No. 23 NC State**	Dail Soccer Stadium • Raleigh, NC	**W** 3–2	555
October 22	7:00 p.m.	High Point	**Duke**	Koskinen Stadium • Durham, NC	**L** 0–1	237
October 22	7:00 p.m.	Loyola (MD)	**No. 2 Wake Forest**	Spry Stadium • Winston-Salem, NC	**T** 1–1 (2OT)	1,099
October 22	7:00 p.m.	Michigan	**Notre Dame**	Alumni Stadium • Notre Dame, IN	**L** 0–1	585
October 22	7:00 p.m.	**No. 21 North Carolina**	Campbell	Eakes Athletics Complex • Buies Creek, NC	**T** 1–1 (2OT)	415
October 22	7:00 p.m.	Radford	**No. 3 Clemson**	Riggs Field • Clemson, SC	**W** 5–0	1,091
October 22	7:00 p.m.	Saint Louis	**No. 6 Virginia**	Klöckner Stadium • Charlottesville, VA	**W** 3–0	1,021
October 22	7:00 p.m.	Temple	**Louisville**	Lynn Stadium • Louisville, KY	**L** 1–2	868
October 25	7:00 p.m.	**Boston College**	**No. 3 Clemson**	Riggs Field • Clemson, SC	**CLEM** 3–1	2,023
October 25	7:00 p.m.	**Duke**	**Pittsburgh**	Ambrose Urbanic Field • Pittsburgh, PA	**PITT** 4–3	875
October 25	7:00 p.m.	**Louisville**	**No. 21 North Carolina**	Fetzer Field • Chapel Hill, NC	**LOU** 1–0	1,326
October 25	7:00 p.m.	**No. 6 Virginia**	**No. 25 Virginia Tech**	Thompson Field • Blacksburg, VA	**UVA** 2–0	1,738
October 26	7:00 p.m.	**No. 23 NC State**	**Syracuse**	SU Soccer Stadium • Syracuse, NY	**CUSE** 3–0	1,007
October 26	7:00 p.m.	**Notre Dame**	**No. 2 Wake Forest**	Spry Stadium • Winston-Salem, NC	**ND** 1–0	3,022

Players of the week:

Offensive		Defensive	
Player	Team	Player	Team
Daryl Dike	Virginia	Duncan Turnbull	Notre Dame
Robbie Robinson (2)	Clemson	Duncan Turnbull	Notre Dame
Reference: ACC

=== Week 9 (Oct. 28 – Nov. 3) ===
Date	Time (ET)	Visiting team	Home team	Site	Result	Attendance
October 29	7:00 p.m.	Appalachian State	**North Carolina**	Fetzer Field • Chapel Hill, NC	**L** 0–1	874
October 29	7:00 p.m.	Denver	**Duke**	Koskinen Stadium • Durham, NC	**W** 1–0	208
October 29	7:00 p.m.	**No. 22 Virginia Tech**	Princeton	Roberts Stadium • Princeton, NJ	**L** 2–3	200
November 1	6:00 p.m.	**No. 7 Wake Forest**	**No. 25 Louisville**	Lynn Stadium • Louisville, KY	**WAKE** 3–1	1,310
November 1	7:00 p.m.	**No. 2 Clemson**	**NC State**	Dail Soccer Stadium • Raleigh, NC	**CLEM** 3–0	1,171
November 1	7:00 p.m.	**North Carolina**	**No. 4 Virginia**	Klöckner Stadium • Charlottesville, VA	**UVA** 2–1 (OT)	2,193
November 1	7:00 p.m.	**Pittsburgh**	**Notre Dame**	Alumni Stadium • Notre Dame, IN	**ND** 1–0	584
November 1	7:00 p.m.	**Syracuse**	**Boston College**	Newton Soccer Complex • Chestnut Hill, MA	**BC** 2–1	413
November 1	7:00 p.m.	**No. 22 Virginia Tech**	**Duke**	Koskinen Stadium • Durham, NC	**VT** 2–1	793

Players of the week:

Offensive		Defensive	
Player	Team	Player	Team
Calvin Harris	Wake Forest	Felicien Dumas (2)	Notre Dame

== Rankings ==
=== National ===
==== United Soccer ====
Legend
Increase in ranking
Decrease in ranking
Not ranked previous week

	Pre	Wk 1	Wk 2	Wk 3	Wk 4	Wk 5	Wk 6	Wk 7	Wk 8	Wk 9	Wk 10	Wk 11	Wk 12	Final
Boston College		RV	RV	RV				RV	RV					RV
Clemson	RV	19	13	7	4	6	11	8	3	2 (4)	2 (1)	1 (19)	3	5
Duke	10	5	2	15	RV	18	21	RV						
Louisville	14	RV	20	RV	17	24	RV	RV	RV	25	RV		RV	20
North Carolina	6	20	18	11	14	20	18	19	21	RV				
NC State	RV	RV	RV	RV		RV	20	23	23	RV	RV	RV	RV	RV
Notre Dame	9	11	10	16	21	RV	RV	RV		RV	RV	RV		
Pittsburgh									RV	RV	RV	25	RV	RV
Syracuse										RV				RV
Virginia	12	7	6	5	3 (4)	1 (20)	1 (25)	1 (22)	6	4	4 (1)	2 (6)	1 (27)	2
Virginia Tech	16	10	9	17	18	22	22	RV	25	22	22	19	23	13
Wake Forest	4	1 (16)	1 (24)	1 (26)	7	3	6	4	2 (3)	7	7	7	9	3 (1)

==== Top Drawer Soccer ====
Legend
Increase in ranking
Decrease in ranking
Not ranked previous week

	Pre	Wk 1	Wk 2	Wk 3	Wk 4	Wk 5	Wk 6	Wk 7	Wk 8	Wk 9	Wk 10	Wk 11	Wk 12	Wk 13	Wk 14	Wk 15	Wk 16	Final
Boston College									14	21	21	16	21	24	25	25	15	25
Clemson				12	8	7	6	11	6	5	5	5	6	4	4	6	8	8
Duke	10	10	7	7	6	21	RV	RV	RV									
Louisville	9	9	8	5	10	10	11	5	20	20	22	20	24	RV	12	14	14	14
North Carolina	7	7	20	23	14	12	RV	RV	18	RV								
NC State	22	22	22	24	RV				17	16	19	17						
Notre Dame	16	16	17	15	13	20	RV	RV	19	22	16	15	20	23				
Pittsburgh											RV				RV	RV	RV	RV
Syracuse	RV	RV								RV	25	25	25	RV	RV	RV	RV	RV
Virginia	15	15	16	3	3	2	1	1	1	3	3	3	1	1	1	1	1	2
Virginia Tech	19	19	19	17	15	13	10	12	16	17	20	19	13	12	11	12	12	12
Wake Forest	3	3	2	1	1	5	4	9	10	4	10	9	9	10	9	8	3	3

=== Regional – USC South Region ===
Legend
Increase in ranking
Decrease in ranking
Not ranked previous week

	Wk 1	Wk 2	Wk 3	Wk 4	Wk 5	Wk 6	Wk 7	Wk 8	Wk 9	Wk 10	Wk 11	Wk 12
Boston College	8	9	9	9	10	9	7	7		10		9
Clemson	6	6	3	2	3	3	3	2	1	1	1	2
Duke	2	2	6	8	4	6	8					
Louisville	10	8	10	5	8	8		8	5	8	9	8
North Carolina	7	7	4	4	5	4	4	4	8			
NC State	9	10	8		6	5	5	5	7	5	6	7
Notre Dame	5	5	5	7	9	10	6		10	6	8	
Pittsburgh				10			10	9	6	9	5	6
Syracuse											10	10
Virginia	3	3	2	1	1	1	1	3	2	2	2	1
Virginia Tech	4	4	7	6	7	7	9	6	4	4	4	5
Wake Forest	1	1	1	3	2	2	2	1	3	3	3	3

== Postseason ==
=== ACC tournament ===
Semifinals
1	Clemson	1
4	Pittsburgh	0
2	Virginia	1
3	Wake Forest	0

Final
1	Clemson	1
2	Virginia	3

=== NCAA tournament ===
Ten teams from the ACC were selected to the NCAA tournament, a record number from one conference. All ten teams were also selected to host their first matches of the tournament. Four teams received seeds, including three of the top four seeds, and first round byes.

Seed	School	1st round	2nd round	3rd round	Quarterfinals	Semifinals	Championship
1	Virginia	BYE	W 2–0 vs. Campbell – (Charlottesville, VA)	W 3–0 vs. St. John's – (Charlottesville, VA)	W 3–2 vs. SMU – (Charlottesville, VA)	W 2–1 vs. Wake Forest – (Cary, NC)	T 3–3 (6–7 PKs) vs. Georgetown – (Cary, NC)
2	Clemson	BYE	W 2–1 (OT) vs. Charlotte – (Clemson, SC)	W 2–1 (OT) vs. Providence – (Clemson, SC)	T 1–1 (4–5 PKs) vs. Stanford – (Clemson, SC)		
4	Wake Forest	BYE	W 3–0 vs. Maryland – (Winston-Salem, NC)	W 3–1 vs. Michigan – (Winston-Salem, NC)	W 1–0 vs. UC Santa Barbara – (Winston-Salem, NC)	L 1–2 vs. Virginia – (Cary, NC)	
10	Virginia Tech	BYE	W 4–1 vs. New Hampshire – (Blacksburg, VA)	L 1–2 vs. Stanford – (Stanford, CA)			
None	Boston College	W 2–0 vs. Yale – (Chestnut Hill, MA)	L 0–2 vs. Washington – (Seattle, WA)				
None	Louisville	W 4–1 vs. South Florida– (Louisville, KY)	W 1–0 vs. UC Davis– (Davis, CA)	L 1–5 vs. Georgetown – (Washington, D.C.)			
None	NC State	L 2–3 (2OT) vs. Coastal Carolina– (Raleigh, NC)					
None	Notre Dame	L 2–3 vs. Wright State – (South Bend, IN)					
None	Pittsburgh	W 2–0 vs. Lehigh – (Pittsburgh, PA)	L 0–5 vs. Georgetown – (Washington, D.C.)				
None	Syracuse	W 3–2 vs. Rhode Island – (Syracuse, NY)	L 1–2 vs. St. John's – (New York, NY)				
	W–L–T (%):	4–2–0 (.667)	5–3–0 (.625)	3–2–0 (.600)	2–0–1 (.833)	1–1–0 (.500)	0–0–1 (.500) Total: 15–8–2 (.640)

== Awards ==
=== Postseason awards ===
The Atlantic Coast Conference post season awards were announced on November 13, 2019, the same day as the Semifinals of the ACC tournament.

==== All-ACC awards and teams ====
2019 ACC Men's Soccer Individual Awards
Award	Recipient(s)
Coach of the Year	Mike Noonan – Clemson
Offensive Player of the Year	Robbie Robinson – Clemson
Midfielder of the Year	Joe Bell – Virginia
Defensive Player of the Year	Malick Mbaye – Clemson
Freshman of the Year	Philip Mayaka – Clemson

2019 ACC Men's Soccer All-Conference Teams
First Team	Second Team	Third Team	Rookie Team
Philip Mayaka, Fr., M, Clemson; Malick Mbaye, Sr., D, Clemson; Robbie Robinson, Jr., F, Clemson; Kimarni Smith, Jr., F, Clemson; Daniele Proch, Sr., M, Duke; Mauricio Pineda, Sr., M, North Carolina; Edward Kizza, Jr., F, Pittsburgh; Ryan Raposo, So., M, Syracuse; Joe Bell, Jr., M, Virginia; Colin Shutler, Jr., GK, Virginia; Bruno Lapa, Sr., M, Wake Forest	Grayson Barber, So., F, Clemson; Tanner Dieterich, Sr., M, Clemson; George Marks, So., GK, Clemson; Cherif Dieye, Sr., M, Louisville; David Loera, Jr., M, NC State; Jeremy Kelly, Sr., M, North Carolina; Jack Skahan, Sr., M, North Carolina; Jack Lynn, So., F, Notre Dame; Daryl Dike, So., F, Virginia; Henry Kessler, Jr., D, Virginia; Kristo Strickler, Jr., M, Virginia Tech	Stefan Sigurdarson, Fr., F, Boston College; Félicien Dumas, Gr., D, Notre Dame; Veljko Petković, Fr., M, Pittsburgh; Sito Sena, Jr., D, Pittsburgh; Robin Afamefuna, Sr., D/M, Virginia; Irakoze Donasiyano, Jr., F, Virginia; Andreas Ueland, Fr., D, Virginia; Machop Chol, Jr., F, Wake Forest; Alistair Johnston, Sr., D, Wake Forest; Andrew Pannenberg, So., GK, Wake Forest; Isaiah Parente, So., M, Wake Forest	Amos Shapiro-Thompson, M, Boston College; Stefan Sigurdarson, F, Boston College; Victor Souza, D, Boston College; Oskar Ågren, D, Clemson; Philip Mayaka, M, Clemson; Valentin Noël, M, Pittsburgh; Arturo Ordoñez, D, Pittsburgh; Veljko Petkovic, M, Pittsburgh; Andreas Ueland, D, Virginia; Daniel Pereira, M, Virginia Tech; Calvin Harris, F, Wake Forest

== MLS SuperDraft ==
Eight players from the ACC were selected in the first round of the 2020 MLS SuperDraft, which ties a record set by the ACC in 2016 and 2018. The eight players were twice as many as any other conference had in the first round. This is the first time the ACC has had the number one overall pick since 2016.

=== Total picks by school ===
Team	Round 1	Round 2	Round 3	Round 4	Total
Clemson	1	2	–	–	3
Louisville	1	–	–	–	1
North Carolina	1	1	–	–	2
Notre Dame	–	1	1	–	2
Syracuse	2	–	–	–	2
Virginia	2	1	–	–	3
Virginia	–	–	–	1	1
Wake Forest	1	1	–	–	2
Total	8	6	1	1	16

=== List of selections ===
Round	Pick #	MLS team	Player	Position	College	Other
1	1	Inter Miami	(United States) Robbie Robinson	FW	Clemson	Generation Adidas
1	4	Vancouver Whitecaps	(Canada) Ryan Raposo	MF	Syracuse	Generation Adidas
1	5	Orlando City	(United States) Daryl Dike	FW	Virginia	Generation Adidas
1	6	New England Revolution	(United States) Henry Kessler	DF	Virginia	Generation Adidas
1	9	Montreal Impact	(United States) Jeremy Kelly	MF	North Carolina	
1	11	Nashville SC	(Canada) Alistair Johnston	DF	Wake Forest	
1	15	New York Red Bulls	(Senegal) Cherif Dieye	MF	Louisville	
1	19	Toronto FC	(Canada) Nyal Higgins	DF	Syracuse	
2	27	San Jose Earthquakes	(United States) Jack Skahan	MF	North Carolina	
2	28	Nashville SC	(United States) Tanner Dieterich	MF	Clemson	
2	31	Orlando City	(United States) Joey DeZart	MF	Wake Forest	
2	33	Toronto FC	(Senegal) Malick Mbaye	DF	Clemson	
2	37	Colorado Rapids	(Germany) Robin Afamefuna	DF	Virginia	
2	48	NYCFC	(France) Felicien Dumas	DF	Notre Dame	
3	70	Houston Dynamo	(United States) Duncan Turnball	GK	Notre Dame	
4	84	Sporting Kansas City	(United States) James Kasak	DF	Virginia Tech	

=== Notable undrafted players ===
The following players went pro after the 2019 season despite not getting drafted in the 2020 MLS draft.

Player	Nationality	Position	College	Team	League
Blake Malone	USA	DF	North Carolina	Orange County SC	USL Championship
Daniele Proch	ITA	FW	Duke	North Carolina FC	USL Championship
Daniel Steedman	SCO	MF	Virginia	Atlanta United 2	USL Championship
