= 2019 Virginia Tech Hokies men's soccer team =

American college soccer season

2019 Virginia Tech Hokies men's soccer

Fairfield Inn/JMU Invitational Champions

NCAA Tournament, Third Round
- Conference: Atlantic Coast Conference
- U. Soc. Coaches poll: No. 13
- TopDrawerSoccer.com: No. 12
- Record: 10–6–3 (2–4–2 ACC)
- Head coach: Mike Brizendine (11th season)
- Assistant coaches: Patrick McSorley (10th season); Josh Dunn (1st season)
- Home stadium: Thompson Field

2019 ACC men's soccer standings
| | Conf. | | | | | Overall |
| Team | W | | L | | T | W | | L | | T |
|---|---|---|---|---|---|---|---|---|---|---|
Atlantic
| No. 5 Clemson + | 6 | – | 1 | – | 1 | 18 | – | 2 | – | 2 |
| No. 3 Wake Forest + | 6 | – | 2 | – | 0 | 16 | – | 5 | – | 2 |
| NC State + | 3 | – | 4 | – | 1 | 9 | – | 7 | – | 3 |
| No. 20 Louisville + | 3 | – | 4 | – | 1 | 10 | – | 8 | – | 2 |
| Boston College + | 2 | – | 4 | – | 2 | 9 | – | 6 | – | 3 |
| Syracuse + | 2 | – | 4 | – | 2 | 8 | – | 7 | – | 4 |
Coastal
| No. 2 Virginia ‡ | 6 | – | 1 | – | 1 | 21 | – | 1 | – | 2 |
| Pittsburgh + | 4 | – | 3 | – | 1 | 10 | – | 8 | – | 2 |
| Notre Dame + | 3 | – | 5 | – | 0 | 10 | – | 8 | – | 1 |
| North Carolina | 3 | – | 5 | – | 0 | 7 | – | 8 | – | 3 |
| No. 13 Virginia Tech + | 2 | – | 4 | – | 2 | 10 | – | 6 | – | 3 |
| Duke | 2 | – | 5 | – | 1 | 7 | – | 9 | – | 2 |
‡ – 2019 ACC Tournament champion + – Invited to the 2019 NCAA tournament; As of 17 December 2019; Rankings from United Soccer Coaches; Source:The ACC

The 2019 Virginia Tech Hokies men's soccer team represented Virginia Tech during the 2019 NCAA Division I men's soccer season. It was the 48th season of the University fielding a program. The Hokies played their home games at Sandra D. Thompson Field in Blacksburg, Virginia. The Hokies were led by eleventh year head coach Mike Brizendine.

== Background ==
The 2018 Virginia Tech men's soccer team finished the season with a 11–7–3 overall record and a 3–4–1 ACC record. The Hokies were seeded seventh–overall in the 2018 ACC Men's Soccer Tournament. The Hokies won their first round match up against Syracuse, but fell to North Carolina in the second round. The Hokies earned an at-large bid into the 2018 NCAA Division I Men's Soccer Tournament. As the twelfth overall seed Virginia Tech defeated Charlotte in the second round, before losing to James Madison in the third round.

== Player movement ==
=== Players leaving ===
| Name | Number | Pos. | Height | Year | Hometown | Reason for departure |
|---|---|---|---|---|---|---|
| Arion Sobers-Assue | 11 | FW | 6'0" | (redshirt) Senior | Miami, FL | Graduated |
| Rory Slevin | 16 | MF | 5'11" | Senior | Middletown, NJ | Graduated |

=== Players arriving ===
Virginia Tech announced its 2019 signing class of six players on November 28, 2018.

| Name | Nat. | Hometown | Club | TDS Rating |
|---|---|---|---|---|
| Alex Adjetey; FW | GHA | Accra, Ghana | Beachside Academy | 3/5 stars |
| Nicholas Blacklock; FW | USA | Hellertown, PA | Philadelphia Union | 2/5 stars |
| Daniel Pereira; MF | VEN | Roanoke, VA | Roanoke Star | 2/5 stars |
| Daniel Starr; FW | USA | Charlottesville, VA | SOCA | 2/5 stars |
| Kyle Stenzel; DF | USA | Staunton, VA | SOCA | 2/5 stars |
| Matt Zambetti; GK | USA | Mechanicsburg, PA | HMMS Eagle FC | 2/5 stars |

== Squad ==
=== Roster ===
Updated: December 2, 2019

Note: Flags indicate national team as defined under FIFA eligibility rules; some limited exceptions apply. Players may hold more than one non-FIFA nationality.

| No. | Pos. | Nation | Player |
|---|---|---|---|
| 0 | GK | USA | Connor Jordan-Hyde |
| 1 | GK | NED | Mathijs Swaneveld |
| 2 | DF | USA | Will Mejia |
| 3 | DF | NOR | Sivert Haugli |
| 4 | MF | USA | Kyle Stenzel |
| 5 | DF | ISL | Jon Ingason |
| 6 | FW | USA | Brendan Moyers |
| 7 | FW | USA | Nico Quashie |
| 8 | FW | USA | James Kasak |
| 9 | MF | VEN | Daniel Pereira |
| 10 | MF | USA | Chris Little |
| 11 | FW | USA | Daniel Starr |
| 12 | MF | FIN | Emil Koho |
| 13 | DF | CAN | Nikal Clarke-Smith |
| 14 | FW | USA | Kahlil Dover |
| 15 | MF | USA | Kristo Strickler |

| No. | Pos. | Nation | Player |
|---|---|---|---|
| 16 | FW | USA | Nick Blacklock |
| 17 | DF | SUI | Marc Hoppler |
| 18 | FW | USA | Jacob Labovitz |
| 19 | DF | USA | Nathan Durst |
| 20 | MF | USA | Femi Adu |
| 21 | MF | USA | Camron Lennon |
| 22 | DF | USA | Mason McClendon |
| 23 | FW | USA | Evans Moyo |
| 24 | MF | FIN | Justus Kauppinen |
| 25 | GK | USA | Matt Zambetti |
| 26 | DF | USA | Chris Nicola |
| 27 | GK | USA | Hayden Kickbush |
| 30 | FW | GHA | Alex Adjetey |
| 31 | FW | GER | Jakob Bluemler |
| 32 | MF | USA | Andrew Weber |

== Team management ==
| Position | Staff |
|---|---|
| Athletic Director | Whit Babcock |
| Head coach | Mike Brizendine |
| Assistant Coach | Patrick McSorley |
| Assistant Coach | Josh Dunn |

== Schedule ==
| Date Time, TV | Rank^{#} | Opponent^{#} | Result | Record | Site (Attendance) City, State |
Exhibition
| August 16*; 4:00 p.m. | No. 16 | at No. 23 West Virginia | W 3–1 | – (–) | Dick Dlesk Soccer Stadium; Morgantown, WV |
| August 20*; 7:00 p.m. | No. 16 | Old Dominion | W 2–1 | – (–) | Thompson Field; Blacksburg, VA |
| August 24*; 4:00 p.m. | No. 16 | No. 13 Georgetown | L 0–3 | – (–) | Thompson Field; Blacksburg, VA |
Regular season
| August 30*; 7:00 p.m. | No. 16 | at Loyola Marymount | W 2–1 | 1–0–0 (0–0–0) | Sullivan Field (0); Los Angeles, CA |
| September 1*; 7:00 p.m. | No. 16 | at UC Santa Barbara | W 3–1 | 2–0–0 (0–0–0) | Harder Stadium (1,500); Santa Barbara, CA |
| September 6*; 4:00 p.m. | No. 10 | vs. Loyola; JMU Invitational | W 2–1 | 3–0–0 (0–0–0) | Sentara Park (0); Harrisonburg, VA |
| September 8*; 4:00 p.m. | No. 10 | vs. Hofstra; JMU Invitational | W 4–3 | 4–0–0 (0–0–0) | Sentara Park (0); Harrisonburg, VA |
| September 13; 7:00 p.m. | No. 9 | No. 18 North Carolina | L 1–3 | 4–1–0 (0–1–0) | Thompson Field (2,012); Blacksburg, VA |
| September 17*; 7:00 p.m. | No. 17 | Grand Canyon | W 4–0 | 5–1–0 (0–1–0) | Thompson Field (712); Blacksburg, VA |
| September 20; 7:30 p.m. | No. 17 | at Louisville | L 1–2 | 5–2–0 (0–2–0) | Lynn Stadium (1,164); Louisville, KY |
| September 27; 1:00 p.m. | No. 18 | Boston College | T 2–2 ^{2OT} | 5–2–1 (0–2–1) | Thompson Field (1,232); Blacksburg, VA |
| October 1*; 7:00 p.m. | No. 22 | Gardner-Webb | W 4–0 | 6–2–1 (0–2–1) | Thompson Field (409); Blacksburg, VA |
| October 5; 7:00 p.m. | No. 22 | at No. 6 Clemson | T 0–0 ^{2OT} | 6–2–2 (0–2–2) | Riggs Field (1,639); Clemson, SC |
| October 11; 7:00 p.m. | No. 22 | at Pittsburgh | L 1–3 | 6–3–2 (0–3–2) | Ambrose Urbanic Field (621); Pittsburgh, PA |
| October 18; 5:30 p.m. | | Notre Dame | W 2–1 | 7–3–2 (1–3–2) | Thompson Field (822); Blacksburg, VA |
| October 22*; 7:00 p.m. | No. 25 | Longwood | Postponed | 0–0–0 (0–0–0) | Thompson Field; Blacksburg, VA |
| October 25; 7:00 p.m. | No. 25 | No. 6 Virginia; Rivalry | L 0–2 | 7–4–2 (1–4–2) | Thompson Field (1,738); Blacksburg, VA |
| October 29*; 7:00 p.m. | No. 22 | at Princeton | L 2–3 | 7–5–2 (1–4–2) | Roberts Stadium (200); Princeton, NJ |
| November 1; 7:00 p.m. | No. 22 | at Duke | W 2–1 | 8–5–2 (2–4–2) | Koskinen Stadium (793); Durham, NC |
ACC Tournament
| November 6; 4:00 p.m. | (11) No. 22 | at (6) Louisville; First Round | W 2–0 | 9–5–2 | Lynn Stadium (255); Louisville, KY |
| November 10; 5:00 p.m. | (11) No. 22 | at (3) No. 7 Wake Forest; Quarterfinals | T 2–2 (5–6 PKs) ^{2OT} | 9–5–3 | Spry Stadium (2,009); Winston-Salem, NC |
NCAA Tournament
| November 24; 4:00 p.m. | (10) No. 23 | No. 16 New Hampshire; Second Round | W 4–1 | 10–5–3 | Thompson Field (420); Blacksburg, VA |
| December 1; 8:00 p.m. | (10) No. 23 | at (7) No. 7 Stanford; Third Round | L 1–2 | 10–6–3 | Laird Q. Cagan Stadium (664); Stanford, CA |
*Non-conference game. ^{#}Rankings from United Soccer Coaches. (#) Tournament seedings in parentheses.

== Awards and honors ==
| Recipient | Award | Date | Ref. |
|---|---|---|---|
| Kristo Strickler | All-ACC Second Team | November 13, 2019 | |
| Daniel Pereira | All-ACC Freshman Team | November 13, 2019 | |

== 2020 MLS Super Draft ==
| Player | Team | Round | Pick # | Position |
|---|---|---|---|---|
| James Kasak | Sporting Kansas City | 4 | 84 | DF |

== Rankings ==
Ranking movement Legend: ██ Improvement in ranking. ██ Decrease in ranking. ██ Not ranked the previous week. RV=Others receiving votes.
| Poll | Pre | Wk 1 | Wk 2 | Wk 3 | Wk 4 | Wk 5 | Wk 6 | Wk 7 | Wk 8 | Wk 9 | Wk 10 | Wk 11 | Wk 12 | Wk 13 | Wk 14 | Wk 15 | Wk 16 | Final |
|---|---|---|---|---|---|---|---|---|---|---|---|---|---|---|---|---|---|---|
| United Soccer | 16 | 10 | 9 | 17 | 18 | 22 | 22 | RV | 25 | 22 | 22 | 19 | 23 | None Released | | | | 13 |
| TopDrawer Soccer | 19 | 19 | 19 | 17 | 15 | 13 | 10 | 12 | 16 | 17 | 20 | 19 | 13 | 12 | 11 | 12 | 12 | 12 |

== See also ==
- Virginia Tech Hokies men's soccer
- 2019 Atlantic Coast Conference men's soccer season
- 2019 NCAA Division I men's soccer season
