= 2019 Boston College Eagles men's soccer team =

American college soccer season

2019 Boston College Eagles men's soccer

NCAA Tournament, Second Round
- Conference: Atlantic Coast Conference
- U. Soc. Coaches poll: No. RV
- TopDrawerSoccer.com: No. 25
- Record: 9–6–3 (2–4–2 ACC)
- Head coach: Ed Kelly (32nd season)
- Assistant coaches: Bob Thompson (2nd season); Vasili Uspensky (2nd season); Luke Kelly (1st season)
- Home stadium: Newton Campus Soccer Field

2019 ACC men's soccer standings
	Conf.					Overall
Team	W		L		T	W		L		T
Atlantic
No. 5 Clemson +	6	–	1	–	1	18	–	2	–	2
No. 3 Wake Forest +	6	–	2	–	0	16	–	5	–	2
NC State +	3	–	4	–	1	9	–	7	–	3
No. 20 Louisville +	3	–	4	–	1	10	–	8	–	2
Boston College +	2	–	4	–	2	9	–	6	–	3
Syracuse +	2	–	4	–	2	8	–	7	–	4
Coastal
No. 2 Virginia ‡	6	–	1	–	1	21	–	1	–	2
Pittsburgh +	4	–	3	–	1	10	–	8	–	2
Notre Dame +	3	–	5	–	0	10	–	8	–	1
North Carolina	3	–	5	–	0	7	–	8	–	3
No. 13 Virginia Tech +	2	–	4	–	2	10	–	6	–	3
Duke	2	–	5	–	1	7	–	9	–	2
‡ – 2019 ACC Tournament champion + – Invited to the 2019 NCAA tournament; As of 17 December 2019; Rankings from United Soccer Coaches; Source:The ACC

The 2019 Boston College Eagles men's soccer team represented Boston College during the 2019 NCAA Division I men's soccer season. The Eagles were led by head coach Ed Kelly, in his fourteenth season. They played home games at Newton Soccer Complex. This was the team's 53rd season playing organized men's college soccer and their 15th playing in the Atlantic Coast Conference.

== Background ==
The 2018 Boston College men's soccer team finished the season with a 4–8–4 overall record and a 2–5–1 ACC record. The Eagles were seeded ninth–overall in the 2018 ACC Men's Soccer Tournament, where they lost in the first round to NC State.

The Eagles were not invited to the 2018 NCAA Division I Men's Soccer Tournament, and did not have any players selected in the 2019 MLS SuperDraft.

== Player movement ==
=== Players leaving ===
Name	Number	Pos.	Height	Weight	Year	Hometown	Reason for departure
Simon Enstrom	9	FW	6'1"	187	Senior	Huddinge, Sweden	Graduated
Tommy Garcia-Morillo	11	MF	6'0"	170	Senior	Key Biscayne, FL	Graduated
Abe Bibas	14	DF	6'0"	175	Senior	Sunny Isles Beach, FL	Graduated
Rodolfo Postigo	22	DF	6'5"	200	Senior	Caracas, Venezuela	Graduated
Joshua Forbes	23	MF	5'9"	163	Senior	Bochum, Germany	Graduated
Nat Ballard	32	GK	6'3"	165	Senior	London, England	Graduated

=== Players arriving ===
Name	Nat.	Hometown	Club	TDS Rating
Zach Peter; DF	USA	Avon, CT	Black Rock FC	3/5 stars
Michael Suski; FW	USA	Avon, CT	FSA FC United	3/5 stars

== Squad ==
=== Roster ===
Updated August 19, 2019

Note: Flags indicate national team as defined under FIFA eligibility rules; some limited exceptions apply. Players may hold more than one non-FIFA nationality.

No.	Pos.	Nation	Player
1	GK	(Italy) ITA	Giacomo Piccardo
2	MF	(Iceland) ISL	Heidar Aegisson
3	DF	(United States) USA	David Longo
4	DF	(Italy) ITA	Gregorio Barilla
5	DF	(Spain) ESP	Rafa Salama
6	MF	(United States) USA	Joe Kellett
7	FW	(Germany) GER	Nikita Bondar
8	MF	(Germany) GER	Lasse Lehmann
10	MF	(United States) USA	Amos Shapiro-Thompson
11	MF	(United States) USA	Mike Suski
12	DF	(United States) USA	Wil Jacques
14	FW	(Italy) ITA	Gualtiero Barilla
15	DF	(United States) USA	Victor Souza
16	MF	(United States) USA	Tyshawn Rose
17	MF	(United States) USA	Beto Luna
18	DF	(United States) USA	Walker Davey

No.	Pos.	Nation	Player
19	DF	(United States) USA	Tyler Stott
20	DF	(Costa Rica) CRC	Alejandro Zimmermann
21	MF	(United States) USA	Jesus Sahagun
23	FW	(Iceland) ISL	Stefan Sigurdarson
24	MF	(United States) USA	Ian Buehler
25	MF	(United States) USA	Callum Johnson
26	DF	(United States) USA	Zach Peter
27	MF	(United States) USA	Alex Mieles
28	FW	(United States) USA	Adam French
30	GK	(United States) USA	Christian Garner
32	GK	(Germany) GER	Alvaro Magel
33	GK	(United States) USA	Antonio Chavez Borrelli
47	DF	(Croatia) CRO	Ivan Postolka
77	MF	(Iceland) ISL	Kristofer Konradsson
80	FW	(United States) USA	Roni Diniz

=== Team management ===
Position	Staff
Athletic Director	Martin Jarmond
Head coach	Ed Kelly
Associate head coach	Bob Thompson
Assistant coach	Vasili Uspensky
Assistant coach	Luke Kelly

== Schedule ==
Date Time, TV	Rank^{#}	Opponent^{#}	Result	Record	Site (Attendance) City, State
Exhibition
August 20*; 6:00 p.m.		Providence	W 3–1	— (—)	Newton Soccer Complex; Chestnut Hill, MA
August 24*; 6:00 p.m.		at New Hampshire		— (—)	Bremner Field; Durham, NH
Regular season
August 29*; 2:30 p.m.		Quinnipiac	W 2–0	1–0–0 (0–0–0)	Newton Soccer Complex (N/A); Chestnut Hill, MA
September 1*; 4:00 p.m.		at Boston	W 1–0	2–0–0 (0–0–0)	Nickerson Field (4,415); Boston, MA
September 6*; 5:00 p.m.		Rhode Island	W 2–1	3–0–0 (0–0–0)	Newton Soccer Complex (351); Chestnut Hill, MA
September 10*; 7:00 p.m.		at Holy Cross	W 3–2	4–0–0 (0–0–0)	Smith Stadium (0); Worcester, MA
September 14; 7:00 p.m.		at NC State	L 0–1	4–1–0 (0–1–0)	Dail Soccer Stadium (1,250); Raleigh, NC
September 20; 5:00 p.m.		Pittsburgh	L 0–2	4–2–0 (0–2–0)	Newton Soccer Complex (344); Chestnut Hill, MA
September 24*; 5:00 p.m.		UMass	W 1–0	5–2–0 (0–2–0)	Newton Soccer Complex (180); Chestnut Hill, MA
September 27; 1:00 p.m.		at No. 18 Virginia Tech	T 2–2 ^{2OT}	5–2–1 (0–2–1)	Thompson Field (1,232); Blacksburg, VA
October 1*; 4:00 p.m.		Merrimack	T 0–0 ^{2OT}	5–2–2 (0–2–1)	Newton Soccer Complex (181); Chestnut Hill, MA
October 4; 7:00 p.m.		No. 3 Wake Forest	W 2–1	6–2–2 (1–2–1)	Newton Soccer Complex (523); Chestnut Hill, MA
October 8*; 7:00 p.m.		Northeastern	W 3–0	7–2–2 (1–2–1)	Newton Soccer Complex (206); Chestnut Hill, MA
October 11; 7:00 p.m.		No. 1 Virginia	T 1–1 ^{2OT}	7–2–3 (1–2–2)	Newton Soccer Complex (242); Chestnut Hill, MA
October 18; 7:30 p.m.		at Louisville	L 2–3 ^{2OT}	7–3–3 (1–3–2)	Lynn Stadium (2,643); Louisville, KY
October 25; 7:00 p.m.		at No. 3 Clemson	L 1–3	7–4–3 (1–4–2)	Riggs Field (2,023); Clemson, SC
October 29*; 6:00 p.m.		at Harvard	Postponed	0–0–0 (0–0–0)	Jordan Field; Boston, MA
November 1; 7:00 p.m.		Syracuse	W 2–1	8–4–3 (2–4–2)	Newton Soccer Complex (413); Chestnut Hill, MA
ACC Tournament
November 5; 2:00 p.m.	(9)	at (8) Notre Dame; First Round	L 1–2 ^{2OT}	8–5–3	Alumni Stadium (117); South Bend, IN
NCAA Tournament
November 21*; 7:00 p.m.		Yale; First Round	W 2–0	9–5–3	Newton Soccer Complex (520); Chestnut Hill, MA
November 24*; 8:00 p.m.		at (6) No. 4 Washington; Second Round	L 0–2	9–6–3	Husky Soccer Stadium (1,221); Seattle, WA
*Non-conference game. ^{#}Rankings from United Soccer Coaches. (#) Tournament seedings in parentheses.

== Awards and honors ==
Recipient	Award	Date	Ref.
Stefan Sigurdarson	ACC Offensive Player of the Week	October 7, 2019	
Joe Kellett	ACC Defensive Player of the Week	October 7, 2019	
Stefan Sigurdarson	All-ACC Third Team	November 13, 2019	
Amos Shapiro-Thompson	All-ACC Freshman Team	November 13, 2019	
Stefan Sigurdarson	All-ACC Freshman Team	November 13, 2019	
Victor Souza	All-ACC Freshman Team	November 13, 2019	

== Rankings ==
Ranking movement Legend: ██ Improvement in ranking. ██ Decrease in ranking. ██ Not ranked the previous week. RV=Others receiving votes.
Poll	Pre	Wk 1	Wk 2	Wk 3	Wk 4	Wk 5	Wk 6	Wk 7	Wk 8	Wk 9	Wk 10	Wk 11	Wk 12	Wk 13	Wk 14	Wk 15	Wk 16	Final
United Soccer Coaches		RV	RV	RV				RV	RV					None Released				RV
TopDrawer Soccer									14	21	21	16	21	24	25	25	25	25
