= 2019 Pittsburgh Panthers men's soccer team =

American college soccer season

2019 Pittsburgh Panthers men's soccer

NCAA Tournament, Second Round
- Conference: Atlantic Coast Conference
- U. Soc. Coaches poll: No. RV
- TopDrawerSoccer.com: No. RV
- Record: 10–8–2 (4–3–1 ACC)
- Head coach: Jay Vidovich (4th season)
- Assistant coaches: Michael Behonick (4th season); Rich Costanzo (3rd season)
- Home stadium: Ambrose Urbanic Field

2019 ACC men's soccer standings
	Conf.					Overall
Team	W		L		T	W		L		T
Atlantic
No. 5 Clemson +	6	–	1	–	1	18	–	2	–	2
No. 3 Wake Forest +	6	–	2	–	0	16	–	5	–	2
NC State +	3	–	4	–	1	9	–	7	–	3
No. 20 Louisville +	3	–	4	–	1	10	–	8	–	2
Boston College +	2	–	4	–	2	9	–	6	–	3
Syracuse +	2	–	4	–	2	8	–	7	–	4
Coastal
No. 2 Virginia ‡	6	–	1	–	1	21	–	1	–	2
Pittsburgh +	4	–	3	–	1	10	–	8	–	2
Notre Dame +	3	–	5	–	0	10	–	8	–	1
North Carolina	3	–	5	–	0	7	–	8	–	3
No. 13 Virginia Tech +	2	–	4	–	2	10	–	6	–	3
Duke	2	–	5	–	1	7	–	9	–	2
‡ – 2019 ACC Tournament champion + – Invited to the 2019 NCAA tournament; As of 17 December 2019; Rankings from United Soccer Coaches; Source:The ACC

The 2019 Pittsburgh Panthers men's soccer team represented University of Pittsburgh during the 2019 NCAA Division I men's soccer season. The Panthers were led by head coach Jay Vidovich, in his fourth season. They played home games at Ambrose Urbanic Field. This was the team's 66th season playing organized men's college soccer and their 7th playing in the Atlantic Coast Conference.

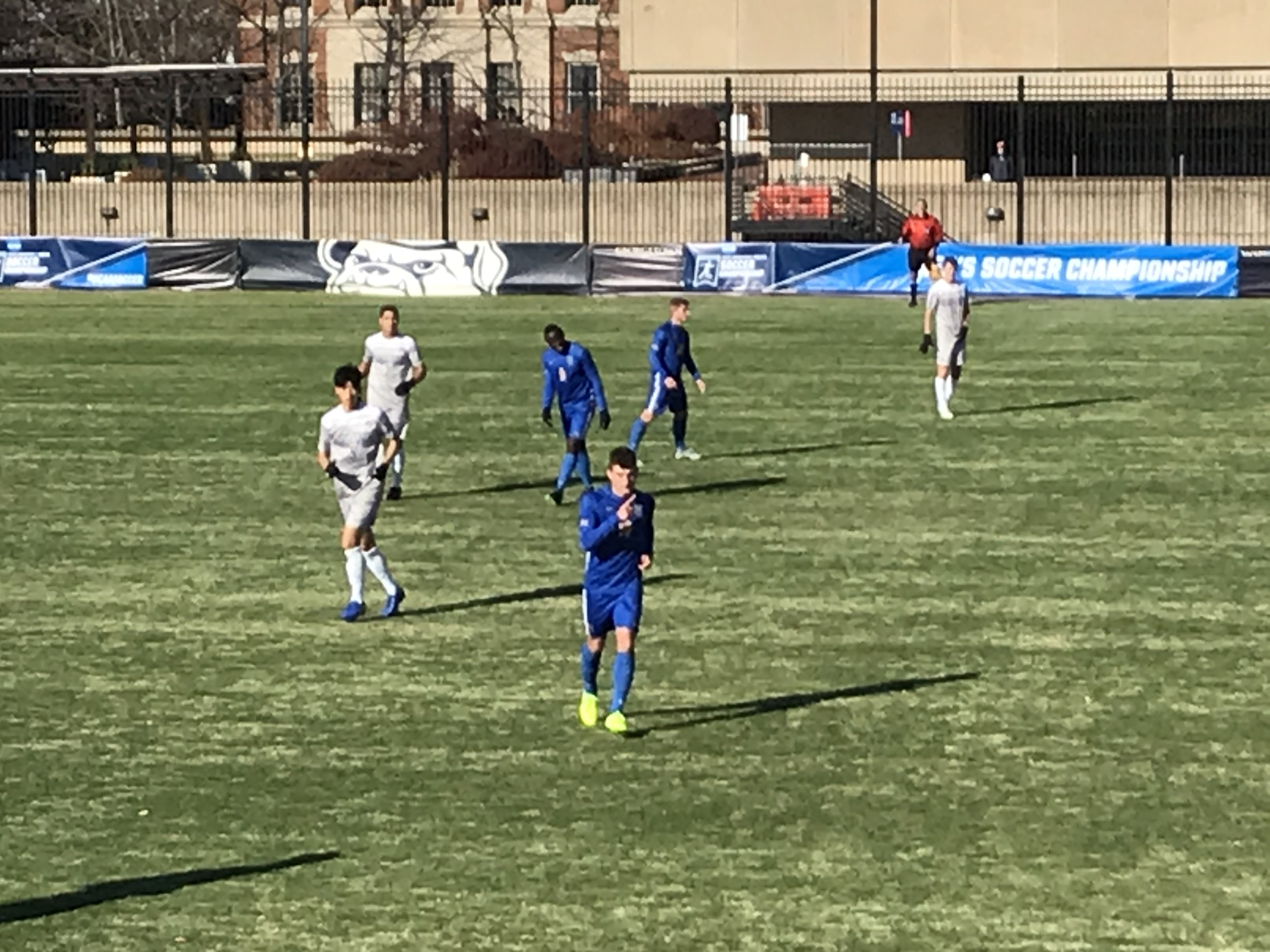
Pitt at Georgetown in the second round of the 2019 NCAA Division I Men's Soccer Tournament

Pitt earned their first berth into the NCAA Division I Men's Soccer Tournament since 1965.

== Background ==
The 2018 Pittsburgh men's soccer team finished the season with an 8–10–1 overall record and a 2–6–0 ACC record. The Panthers were seeded eleventh–overall in the 2018 ACC Men's Soccer Tournament, where they upset Virginia in the first round before losing to Duke on penalties in the second round.

The Panthers were not invited to the 2018 NCAA Division I Men's Soccer Tournament. The Panthers had one player selected in the 2019 MLS SuperDraft: Javi Pérez, by Los Angeles FC.

== Player movement ==
=== Players leaving ===
Name	Number	Pos.	Height	Weight	Year	Hometown	Reason for departure
Peter Prescott	2	DF	6'4"	180	Senior	Vancouver, WA	Graduated
Tom Moxham	3	DF	6'0"	165	Senior	Plymouth, England	Graduated
Shane Wiedt	4	DF	6'3"	180	(redshirt) Senior	Akron, OH	Graduated
Joshua Gaspari	5	MF	5'7"	158	(redshirt) Senior	Canberra, Australia	Graduated
Javi Pérez	6	MF	5'8"	158	Senior	Valencia, Spain	Declared for 2019 MLS SuperDraft; selected 64th overall by Los Angeles FC
Robby Dambrot	22	DF	6'1"	166	(redshirt) Senior	Akron, OH	Graduated
Craig Bair	23	DF	5'6"	155	(redshirt) Senior	Brecksville, OH	Graduated

=== Players arriving ===
Name	Nat.	Hometown	Club	TDS Rating
Luke Mort; FW	USA	Greensburg, PA	Pittsburgh Riverhounds SC	2/5 stars
Veljko Petković; MF	USA	Ridgewood, NY	NYCFC	3/5 stars

== Squad ==
=== Roster ===
Updated August 20, 2019

Note: Flags indicate national team as defined under FIFA eligibility rules; some limited exceptions apply. Players may hold more than one non-FIFA nationality.

No.	Pos.	Nation	Player
0	GK	USA	Johan Peñaranda
1	GK	USA	Alexander Steinbach
2	DF	USA	Nyk Sessock
3	DF	USA	Chandler Vaughn
4	DF	USA	Bryce Washington
5	DF	ESP	Arturo Ordoñez
6	MF	GER	Lucas Cyriacus
7	MF	USA	Braden Kline
8	MF	FRA	Valentin Noël
9	FW	UGA	Edward Kizza
11	MF	BRA	Rodrigo Almeida
12	FW	ENG	Josh Hesson
13	FW	USA	Alexander Dexter

No.	Pos.	Nation	Player
14	DF	ESP	Sito Sena
15	FW	USA	Luke Mort
17	MF	USA	Alec Townsend
18	MF	USA	Tim Townsend
19	MF	SRB	Veljko Petković
20	MF	USA	Matt Bailey
21	MF	USA	Alex Peperak
22	DF	USA	Sebastian Serpa
24	MF	SUI	Jackson Walti
25	DF	USA	Chad Stout
27	DF	USA	Anthony Harding
28	DF	USA	Tim Ekopne
32	GK	USA	Arie Ammann

=== Team management ===
Position	Staff
Athletic Director	Heather Lyke
Head coach	Jay Vidovich
Assistant Coach	Michael Behonick
Assistant Coach	Rich Costanzo

== Schedule ==
Date Time, TV	Rank^{#}	Opponent^{#}	Result	Record	Site (Attendance) City, State
Exhibition
August 17*; 7:00 p.m.		Duquesne	W 5–0	– (–)	Ambrose Urbanic Field; Pittsburgh, PA
August 23*; 5:00 p.m.		at No. 17 James Madison	W 1–0	– (–)	Sentara Park; Harrisonburg, VA
Regular season
August 30*; 8:00 p.m.		at No. 2 Indiana; Adidas/IU Credit Union Classic	L 2–3 ^{2OT}	0–1–0 (0–0–0)	Bill Armstrong Stadium (2,847); Bloomington, IN
September 1*; 5:00 p.m.		vs. Northwestern; Adidas/IU Credit Union Classic	L 0–1	0–2–0 (0–0–0)	Bill Armstrong Stadium (0); Bloomington, IN
September 6*; 7:30 p.m.		Liberty	W 3–0	1–2–0 (0–0–0)	Ambrose Urbanic Field (906); Pittsburgh, PA
September 9*; 7:00 p.m.		Delaware	T 3–3 ^{2OT}	1–2–1 (0–0–0)	Ambrose Urbanic Field (309); Pittsburgh, PA
September 13; 7:00 p.m.		No. 1 Wake Forest	L 0–2	1–3–1 (0–1–0)	Ambrose Urbanic Field (913); Pittsburgh, PA
September 16*; 7:00 p.m.		Akron	W 1–0	2–3–1 (0–1–0)	Ambrose Urbanic Field (576); Pittsburgh, PA
September 20; 5:00 p.m.		at Boston College	W 2–0	3–3–1 (1–1–0)	Newton Soccer Complex (344); Chestnut Hill, MA
September 27; 7:00 p.m.		at Syracuse	T 1–1 ^{2OT}	3–3–2 (1–1–1)	SU Soccer Stadium (1,706); Syracuse, NY
September 30*; 7:00 p.m.		Denver	W 3–2 ^{2OT}	4–3–2 (1–1–1)	Ambrose Urbanic Field (279); Pittsburgh, PA
October 4; 7:00 p.m.		No. 20 North Carolina	L 1–2	4–4–2 (1–2–1)	Ambrose Urbanic Field (704); Pittsburgh, PA
October 7*; 7:00 p.m.		Howard	W 6–0	5–4–2 (1–2–1)	Ambrose Urbanic Field (207); Pittsburgh, PA
October 11; 7:00 p.m.		No. 22 Virginia Tech	W 3–1	6–4–2 (2–2–1)	Ambrose Urbanic Field (621); Pittsburgh, PA
October 15*; 7:00 p.m.		at Penn State	L 1–3	6–5–2 (2–2–1)	Jeffrey Field (509); State College, PA
October 18; 7:00 p.m.		at No. 1 Virginia	W 2–0	7–5–2 (3–2–1)	Klöckner Stadium (3,201); Charlottesville, VA
October 25; 7:00 p.m.		Duke	W 4–3	8–5–2 (4–2–1)	Ambrose Urbanic Field (875); Pittsburgh, PA
November 1; 7:00 p.m.		at Notre Dame	L 0–1	8–6–2 (4–3–1)	Alumni Stadium (584); South Bend, IN
ACC Tournament
November 10; 3:00 p.m.	(4)	(5) NC State; Quarterfinals	W 2–1 ^{OT}	9–6–2	Ambrose Urbanic Field (1,010); Pittsburgh, PA
November 13; 6:00 p.m.	(4) No. 25	at (1) No. 1 Clemson; Semifinals	L 0–1	9–7–2	Riggs Field (1,573); Clemson, SC
NCAA Tournament
November 21; 7:00 p.m.		Lehigh; First Round	W 2–0	10–7–2	Ambrose Urbanic Field (1,321); Pittsburgh, PA
November 24; 12:00 p.m.		at (3) No. 2 Georgetown; Second Round	L 0–5	10–8–2	Shaw Field (1,497); Washington, D.C.
*Non-conference game. ^{#}Rankings from United Soccer Coaches. (#) Tournament seedings in parentheses.

== Awards and honors ==
Recipient	Award	Date	Ref.
Edward Kizza	All-ACC First Team	November 13, 2019	
Veljko Petković	All-ACC Third Team	November 13, 2019	
Sito Sena	All-ACC Third Team	November 13, 2019	
Valentin Noël	All-ACC Freshman Team	November 13, 2019	
Arturo Ordoñez	All-ACC Freshman Team	November 13, 2019	
Veljko Petkovic	All-ACC Freshman Team	November 13, 2019	
Edward Kizza	All-ACC Tournament Team	November 17, 2019	
Arturo Ordonez	All-ACC Tournament Team	November 17, 2019	

== Rankings ==
Ranking movement Legend: ██ Improvement in ranking. ██ Decrease in ranking. ██ Not ranked the previous week. RV=Others receiving votes.
Poll	Pre	Wk 1	Wk 2	Wk 3	Wk 4	Wk 5	Wk 6	Wk 7	Wk 8	Wk 9	Wk 10	Wk 11	Wk 12	Wk 13	Wk 14	Wk 15	Wk 16	Final
United Soccer									RV	RV	RV	25	RV	None Released				RV
TopDrawer Soccer											RV				RV	RV	RV	RV
