= 2019 Wake Forest Demon Deacons men's soccer team =

American college soccer season

2019 Wake Forest Demon Deacons men's soccer

Carolina Nike Classic Champions

NCAA Tournament, Semifinals
- Conference: Atlantic Coast Conference
- U. Soc. Coaches poll: No. 3
- TopDrawerSoccer.com: No. 3
- Record: 16–5–2 (6–2–0 ACC)
- Head coach: Bobby Muuss (5th season)
- Assistant coaches: Steve Armas (5th season); Dane Brenner (9th season); Jonathan Lagos (1st season)
- Home stadium: Spry Stadium

2019 ACC men's soccer standings
| | Conf. | | | | | Overall |
| Team | W | | L | | T | W | | L | | T |
|---|---|---|---|---|---|---|---|---|---|---|
Atlantic
| No. 5 Clemson + | 6 | – | 1 | – | 1 | 18 | – | 2 | – | 2 |
| No. 3 Wake Forest + | 6 | – | 2 | – | 0 | 16 | – | 5 | – | 2 |
| NC State + | 3 | – | 4 | – | 1 | 9 | – | 7 | – | 3 |
| No. 20 Louisville + | 3 | – | 4 | – | 1 | 10 | – | 8 | – | 2 |
| Boston College + | 2 | – | 4 | – | 2 | 9 | – | 6 | – | 3 |
| Syracuse + | 2 | – | 4 | – | 2 | 8 | – | 7 | – | 4 |
Coastal
| No. 2 Virginia ‡ | 6 | – | 1 | – | 1 | 21 | – | 1 | – | 2 |
| Pittsburgh + | 4 | – | 3 | – | 1 | 10 | – | 8 | – | 2 |
| Notre Dame + | 3 | – | 5 | – | 0 | 10 | – | 8 | – | 1 |
| North Carolina | 3 | – | 5 | – | 0 | 7 | – | 8 | – | 3 |
| No. 13 Virginia Tech + | 2 | – | 4 | – | 2 | 10 | – | 6 | – | 3 |
| Duke | 2 | – | 5 | – | 1 | 7 | – | 9 | – | 2 |
‡ – 2019 ACC Tournament champion + – Invited to the 2019 NCAA tournament; As of 17 December 2019; Rankings from United Soccer Coaches; Source:The ACC

The 2019 Wake Forest Demon Deacons men's soccer team represented Wake Forest University during the 2019 NCAA Division I men's soccer season. It was the 73rd season of the university fielding a program. It was the program's fifth season with Bobby Muuss as head coach. The Demon Deacons played their home matches at Spry Stadium.

== Background ==
The 2018 Wake Forest men's soccer team finished the season with a 18–3–0 overall record and a 7–1–0 ACC record. The Demon Deacons were seeded first–overall in the 2018 ACC Men's Soccer Tournament, where they defeated NC State in the Quarterfinals, but lost to eventual champions Louisville in the Semifinals. The Demon Deacons earned an at-large bid into the 2018 NCAA Division I Men's Soccer Tournament. As the first–overall seed in the tournament, Wake Forest defeated Colgate in the second round before being upset by eventual runners-up Akron in the third round.

At the end of the season, two Demon Deacons men's soccer players were selected in the 2019 MLS SuperDraft: Logan Gdula and Brad Dunwell.

== Player movement ==
=== Players leaving ===
| Name | Number | Pos. | Height | Weight | Year | Hometown | Reason for departure |
|---|---|---|---|---|---|---|---|
| Brad Dunwell | 12 | MF | 5'8" | 165 | Senior | Grand Rapids, MI | Declared for 2019 MLS SuperDraft; selected 56th overall by Houston Dynamo |
| Logan Gdula | 17 | DF | 5'11" | 160 | Senior | East Lyme, CT | Declared for 2019 MLS SuperDraft; selected 13th overall by FC Cincinnati |
| Sam Raben | 26 | DF | 6'0" | 165 | Senior | Greenwood Village, CO | Graduated |
| Tre Bailey | 29 | DF | 5'10" | 160 | Senior | Durham, NC | Graduated |

=== Players arriving ===
| Name | Nat. | Hometown | Club | TDS Rating |
|---|---|---|---|---|
| Nico Benalcazar; DF | USA | Wilton, CT | NYCFC | 4/5 stars |
| Ryan Fessler; MF | USA | Charlotte, NC | Sporting Kansas City (Academy) | 3/5 stars |
| Calvin Harris; FW | NZL | Wellington, New Zealand | Wellington Phoenix FC | N/A |
| Omar Hernandez; MF | USA | Dalton, GA | Chattanooga FC (Academy) | 3/5 stars |
| Cole McNally; GK | USA | Mount Airy, MD | Bethesda SC Academy | 3/5 stars |
| Jaden Servania; MF | PUR | Birmingham, AL | Houston Dynamo | 3/5 stars |
| Takuma Suzuki; MF | JPN | Peachtree City, GA | Atlanta United | 3/5 stars |
| David Wrona; FW | USA | Hoover, AL | Crew SC Academy | 2/5 stars |

== Squad ==
=== Roster ===
Updated:August 19, 2019

Note: Flags indicate national team as defined under FIFA eligibility rules; some limited exceptions apply. Players may hold more than one non-FIFA nationality.

| No. | Pos. | Nation | Player |
|---|---|---|---|
| 0 | GK | USA | Andrew Pannenberg |
| 1 | GK | ESP | Andreu Cases Mundet |
| 2 | DF | USA | Koby Carr |
| 3 | FW | USA | Kyle Holcomb |
| 4 | DF | USA | Holland Rula |
| 5 | DF | TRI | Michael DeShields |
| 6 | DF | USA | Justyn Thomas |
| 7 | FW | USA | Aristotle Zarris |
| 8 | MF | CAN | Alistair Johnston |
| 9 | FW | USA | Tater Rennhack |
| 10 | MF | BRA | Bruno Lapa |
| 11 | MF | JAM | Justin McMaster |
| 12 | MF | USA | Takuma Suzuki |
| 13 | FW | USA | David Wrona |

| No. | Pos. | Nation | Player |
|---|---|---|---|
| 14 | MF | JAM | Joey DeZart |
| 15 | MF | USA | Isaiah Parente |
| 17 | MF | USA | Omar Hernandez |
| 19 | DF | USA | Eddie Folds |
| 20 | MF | USA | Kyle McCurley |
| 21 | MF | USA | Machop Chol |
| 22 | FW | NZL | Calvin Harris |
| 23 | DF | USA | Nico Benalcazar |
| 24 | MF | USA | Jake Swallen |
| 25 | MF | PHI | William Valtos |
| 28 | DF | USA | Tyrrell Moore |
| 30 | GK | USA | Dominic Peters |
| 31 | GK | USA | Cole McNally |
| 33 | DF | USA | Sebastian Scrivner |

=== Team management ===
| Position | Staff |
|---|---|
| Athletic Director | Ron Wellman |
| Head coach | Bobby Muuss |
| Associate head coach | Steve Armas |
| Assistant coach | Dane Brenner |
| Assistant coach | Jonathan Lagos |
| Assistant Athletic Trainer | Michael White |
| Academic Counselor | Brooke Taylor |
| Sports Performance | David Bass |

== Schedule ==
| Date Time, TV | Rank^{#} | Opponent^{#} | Result | Record | Site (Attendance) City, State |
Exhibition
| August 18*; 7:00 p.m. | No. 4 | at Furmam | W 2–1 | – (–) | Stone Stadium; Greenville, SC |
| August 24*; 8:00 p.m. | No. 4 | Army | W 3–2 | – (–) | Spry Stadium (2,127); Winston–Salem, NC |
Regular season
| August 30*; 6:00 p.m. | No. 4 | No. 15 UCF; Carolina Nike Classic | W 2–1 | 1–0–0 (0–0–0) | Spry Stadium (1,578); Winston–Salem, NC |
| September 1*; 7:00 p.m. | No. 4 | Creighton; Carolina Nike Classic | W 1–0 | 2–0–0 (0–0–0) | Spry Stadium (2,089); Winston–Salem, NC |
| September 6*; 7:00 p.m. | No. 1 | Dartmouth | W 3–1 | 3–0–0 (0–0–0) | Spry Stadium (0); Winston–Salem, NC |
| September 9*; 7:00 p.m. | No. 1 | Houston Baptist | W 4–0 | 4–0–0 (0–0–0) | Spry Stadium (1,187); Winston–Salem, NC |
| September 13; 7:00 p.m. | No. 1 | at Pittsburgh | W 2–0 | 5–0–0 (1–0–0) | Ambrose Urbanic Field (913); Pittsburgh, PA |
| September 17*; 7:00 p.m. | No. 1 | at James Madison | L 0–1 | 5–1–0 (1–0–0) | Sentara Park (1,453); Harrisonburg, VA |
| September 21; 7:30 p.m. | No. 1 | Syracuse | W 1–0 | 6–1–0 (2–0–0) | Spry Stadium (3,143); Winston–Salem, NC |
| September 24*; 7:00 p.m. | No. 7 | at Davidson | W 1–0 | 7–1–0 (2–0–0) | Alumni Soccer Stadium (849); Davdison, NC |
| September 28; 7:00 p.m. | No. 7 | No. 4 Clemson | W 3–2 ^{OT} | 8–1–0 (3–0–0) | Spry Stadium (4,126); Winston–Salem, NC |
| October 4; 7:00 p.m. | No. 3 | at Boston College | L 1–2 | 8–2–0 (3–1–0) | Newton Soccer Complex (523); Chestnut Hill, MA |
| October 8*; 7:00 p.m. | No. 6 | High Point | W 9–0 | 9–2–0 (3–1–0) | Spry Stadium (1,377); Winston–Salem, NC |
| October 11; 7:00 p.m. | No. 6 | at No. 20 NC State; Rivalry | W 3–1 | 10–2–0 (4–1–0) | Dail Soccer Field (1,056); Raleigh, NC |
| October 15*; 7:00 p.m. | No. 4 | William & Mary | W 5–0 | 11–2–0 (4–1–0) | Spry Stadium (877); Winston–Salem, NC |
| October 18; 6:00 p.m. | No. 4 | No. 19 North Carolina; Rivalry | W 1–0 | 12–2–0 (5–1–0) | Spry Stadium (3,315); Winston–Salem, NC |
| October 22*; 7:00 p.m. | No. 2 | Loyola (MD) | T 1–1 ^{2OT} | 12–2–1 (5–1–0) | Spry Stadium (1,099); Winston–Salem, NC |
| October 26; 7:00 p.m. | No. 2 | Notre Dame | L 0–1 | 12–3–1 (5–2–0) | Spry Stadium (3,022); Winston–Salem, NC |
| November 1; 6:00 p.m. | No. 7 | at No. 25 Louisville | W 3–1 | 13–3–1 (6–2–0) | Lynn Stadium (1,310); Louisville, KY |
ACC Tournament
| November 10; 5:00 p.m. | (3) No. 7 | (11) No. 22 Virginia Tech; Quarterfinals | T 2–2 (6–5 PKs) ^{2OT} | 13–3–2 | Spry Stadium (2,009); Winston–Salem, NC |
| November 13; 4:00 p.m. | (3) No. 7 | (2) No. 2 Virginia; Semifinals | L 0–1 | 13–4–2 | Klöckner Stadium (586); Charlottesville, VA |
NCAA Tournament
| November 24; 5:00 p.m. | (4) No. 9 | Maryland; Second Round | W 3–0 | 14–4–2 | Spry Stadium (1,765); Winston–Salem, NC |
| December 1; 5:00 p.m. | (4) No. 9 | (13) No. 17 Michigan; Third Round | W 3–1 | 15–4–2 | Spry Stadium (1,206); Winston–Salem, NC |
| December 7; 5:00 p.m. | (4) No. 9 | No. 22 UC Santa Barbara; Quarterfinals | W 1–0 | 16–4–2 | Spry Stadium (2,027); Winston–Salem, NC |
| December 13; 6:00 p.m. | (4) No. 9 | (1) No. 1 Virginia; Semifinals | L 1–2 | 16–5–2 | Sahlen's Stadium (9,862); Cary, NC |
*Non-conference game. ^{#}Rankings from United Soccer Coaches. (#) Tournament seedings in parentheses.

== Awards and honors ==
| Recipient | Award | Date | Ref. |
|---|---|---|---|
| Bruno Lapa | MAC Hermann Trophy Preseason Watchlist | August 1, 2019 | |
| Michael DeShields | ACC Defensive Player of the Week | September 3, 2019 | |
| Andrew Pannenburg | ACC Defensive Player of the Week | September 16, 2019 | |
| Justin McMaster | ACC Offensive Player of the Week | September 30, 2019 | |
| Andrew Pannenburg | ACC Defensive Player of the Week | October 21, 2019 | |
| Calvin Harris | ACC Offensive Player of the Week | November 4, 2019 | |
| Bruno Lapa | All-ACC First Team | November 13, 2019 | |
| Machop Chol | All-ACC Third Team | November 13, 2019 | |
| Alistair Johnston | All-ACC Third Team | November 13, 2019 | |
| Andrew Pannenberg | All-ACC Third Team | November 13, 2019 | |
| Isaiah Parente | All-ACC Third Team | November 13, 2019 | |
| Calvin Harris | All-ACC Freshman Team | November 13, 2019 | |
| Michael DeShields | All-ACC Tournament Team | November 17, 2019 | |
| Joey DeZart | All-ACC Tournament Team | November 17, 2019 | |

== 2020 MLS Super draft ==
| Player | Team | Round | Pick # | Position |
|---|---|---|---|---|
| Alistair Johnston | Nashville SC | 1 | 11 | DF |
| Joey DeZart | Orlando City SC | 2 | 31 | MF |

== Rankings ==
Ranking movements Legend: ██ Increase in ranking ██ Decrease in ranking ( ) = First-place votes
| | Week | | | | | | | | | | | | | | | | | |
| Poll | Pre | 1 | 2 | 3 | 4 | 5 | 6 | 7 | 8 | 9 | 10 | 11 | 12 | 13 | 14 | 15 | 16 | Final |
|---|---|---|---|---|---|---|---|---|---|---|---|---|---|---|---|---|---|---|
| United Soccer | 4 | 1 (16) | 1 (24) | 1 (26) | 7 | 3 | 6 | 4 | 2 (3) | 7 | 7 | 7 | 9 | Not released | | | | 3 (1) |
| TopDrawer Soccer | 3 | 3 | 2 | 1 | 1 | 5 | 4 | 9 | 10 | 4 | 10 | 9 | 9 | 10 | 9 | 8 | 3 | 3 |
