= 2019 NC State Wolfpack men's soccer team =

American college soccer season

2019 NC State Wolfpack men's soccer

NCAA Tournament, First Round
- Conference: Atlantic Coast Conference
- U. Soc. Coaches poll: No. RV
- Record: 9–7–3 (3–4–1 ACC)
- Head coach: George Kiefer (3rd season)
- Assistant coaches: Jeff Negalha (3rd season); Kyle Nicholls (3rd season); Lucas Champenois (1st season)
- Home stadium: Dail Soccer Field

2019 ACC men's soccer standings
	Conf.					Overall
Team	W		L		T	W		L		T
Atlantic
No. 5 Clemson +	6	–	1	–	1	18	–	2	–	2
No. 3 Wake Forest +	6	–	2	–	0	16	–	5	–	2
NC State +	3	–	4	–	1	9	–	7	–	3
No. 20 Louisville +	3	–	4	–	1	10	–	8	–	2
Boston College +	2	–	4	–	2	9	–	6	–	3
Syracuse +	2	–	4	–	2	8	–	7	–	4
Coastal
No. 2 Virginia ‡	6	–	1	–	1	21	–	1	–	2
Pittsburgh +	4	–	3	–	1	10	–	8	–	2
Notre Dame +	3	–	5	–	0	10	–	8	–	1
North Carolina	3	–	5	–	0	7	–	8	–	3
No. 13 Virginia Tech +	2	–	4	–	2	10	–	6	–	3
Duke	2	–	5	–	1	7	–	9	–	2
‡ – 2019 ACC Tournament champion + – Invited to the 2019 NCAA tournament; As of 17 December 2019; Rankings from United Soccer Coaches; Source:The ACC

The 2019 NC State Wolfpack men's soccer team represented North Carolina State University during the 2019 NCAA Division I men's soccer season. The Wolfpack were led by head coach George Kiefer, in his third season.

== Background ==
The 2018 NC State men's soccer team finished the season with a 10–7–3 overall record and a 2–4–2 ACC record. The Wolfpack were seeded eight–overall in the 2018 ACC Men's Soccer Tournament, where they beat Boston College in the first round, but lost to Wake Forest in the second round. The Wolfpack earned an at-large bid into the 2018 NCAA Division I Men's Soccer Tournament, where they beat Campbell in the first round but lost to Maryland in the second round.

== Player movement ==
=== Players Leaving ===
Name	Number	Pos.	Height	Weight	Year	Hometown	Reason for departure
Stephen Elias	5	FW	5'8"	160	Senior	Rye, NY	Graduated
Christoph Schneuwly	6	DF	5'10"	154	Senior	Schmitten, Switzerland	Graduated
Tanner Roberts	7	FW	6'2"	180	Senior	Huntersville, NC	Graduated
Ade Taiwo	9	FW	6'2"	209	(redshirt) Senior	Raleigh, NC	Graduated
Vincent Durand	12	GK	6'3"	192	Senior	Cary, NC	Graduated
Simon Blotko	13	DF	6'0"	178	Senior	Düsseldorf, Germany	Graduated
Cjay Sparks	14	FW	6'1"	177	Senior	Jacksonville, FL	Graduated
Nick Retzlaff	17	MF	5'7"	132	(redshirt) Senior	Wake Forest, NC	Graduated

=== Players Arriving ===
Name	Nat.	Hometown	Club	TDS Rating
Sheldon China; FW	USA	Durham, NC	North Carolina FC	3/5 stars
Kendall Edwards; DF	JAM	St. Catherine, JAM	Atlanta United FC	4/5 stars
Rhone Ellis; GK	USA	Evergreen, CO	Colorado Rapids	3/5 stars
Win Ellis; GK	USA	Evergreen, CO	Colorado Rapids	3/5 stars
David Merola; GK	USA	Raleigh, NC	North Carolina FC	3/5 stars
Tonny Temple; FW	USA	Millville, PA	Philadelphia Union	4/5 stars
Roberto Ydrach; FW	USA	Orlando, FL	New York Red Bulls	3/5 stars

== Squad ==
=== Roster ===
Updated August 19, 2019

Note: Flags indicate national team as defined under FIFA eligibility rules; some limited exceptions apply. Players may hold more than one non-FIFA nationality.

No.	Pos.	Nation	Player
0	GK	USA	Nick Cournoyer
1	GK	GER	Leon Krapf
2	DF	ESP	Pablo Pedregosa
3	DF	ESP	Pepe Garcia
4	DF	USA	David Norris
5	DF	ENG	Jamie Smith
6	DF	JAM	Kendall Edwards
7	FW	USA	Ivy Brisma
8	MF	ENG	Brad Sweeney
9	FW	ENG	Kuda Muskwe
10	FW	USA	David Loera
11	FW	USA	Tyler Gabarra
12	GK	USA	Vincent Durand
14	MF	GHA	George Asomani

No.	Pos.	Nation	Player
15	MF	BRA	Gabriel Machado
16	MF	USA	AJ Seals
17	FW	USA	Tonny Temple
19	DF	USA	Alex Bautista
20	FW	USA	Sheldon China
21	MF	USA	Eleo Domingos
22	MF	USA	Aidan Foster
23	FW	USA	James Orozco
24	DF	USA	Cyrus Rad
25	MF	USA	Jose Morales Jr.
26	GK	USA	David Merola
28	MF	USA	Bailey O'Connor
29	DF	USA	Harry Adanuty
30	GK	USA	Windham Ellis

=== Team management ===
Position	Staff
Athletic Director	Boo Corrigan
Head coach	George Kiefer
Associate head coach	Jeff Negalha
Assistant coach	Kyle Nicholls
Assistant Coach	Lucas Champenois
Director of Soccer	Lindsey Krakower
Director of Analytics	Paul Forster
Assistant Strength and Conditioning Coach/Director of Sport Science	Craig Turner
Senior Associate AD/Sports Administration & Student Services	Raymond Harrison
Assistant Athletic Trainer	Blake Wickerham
Academics	Maria Crockett

== Schedule ==
Date Time, TV	Rank^{#}	Opponent^{#}	Result	Record	Site (Attendance) City, State
Exhibition
August 18*; 7:00 p.m.		at No. 6 North Carolina; Rivalry	W 2–1	– (–)	Fetzer Field; Chapel Hill, NC
August 24*; 7:00 p.m.		VCU	W 2–1	– (–)	Dail Soccer Field; Raleigh, NC
Regular season
August 30*; 7:00 p.m.		Loyola (MD)	W 2–1	1–0–0 (0–0–0)	Dail Soccer Field (942); Raleigh, NC
September 1*; 7:00 p.m.		St. John's	L 0–1 ^{2OT}	1–1–0 (0–0–0)	Dail Soccer Field (764); Raleigh, NC
September 6*; 7:00 p.m.		Longwood	W 1–0	2–1–0 (0–0–0)	Dail Soccer Field (1,494); Raleigh, NC
September 10*; 7:00 p.m.		at William & Mary	T 1–1 ^{2OT}	2–1–1 (0–0–0)	Albert–Daly Field (226); Williamsburg, VA
September 14; 7:00 p.m.		Boston College	W 1–0	3–1–1 (1–0–0)	Dail Soccer Field (1,250); Raleigh, NC
September 17*; 7:00 p.m.		College of Charleston	W 4–1	4–1–1 (1–0–0)	Dail Soccer Field (731); Raleigh, NC
September 20; 7:00 p.m.		at No. 5 Virginia	L 0–2	4–2–1 (1–1–0)	Klöckner Stadium (3,858); Charlottesville, VA
September 27; 7:00 p.m.		at No. 17 Louisville	W 2–1	5–2–1 (2–1–0)	Lynn Stadium (1,057); Louisville, KY
October 4; 6:00 p.m.		Notre Dame	W 2–0	6–2–1 (3–1–0)	Dail Soccer Field (1,211); Raleigh, NC
October 8*; 7:00 p.m.	No. 20	ETSU	W 1–0	7–2–1 (3–1–0)	Dail Soccer Field (389); Raleigh, NC
October 11; 7:00 p.m.	No. 20	No. 6 Wake Forest; Rivalry	L 1–3	7–3–1 (3–2–0)	Dail Soccer Field (1,056); Raleigh, NC
October 15*; 7:00 p.m.	No. 23	at South Carolina	T 0–0 ^{2OT}	7–3–2 (3–2–0)	Stone Stadium (1,506); Columbia, SC
October 18; 7:00 p.m.	No. 23	at Duke; Rivalry	T 0–0 ^{2OT}	7–3–3 (3–2–1)	Koskinen Stadium (918); Durham, NC
October 22*; 7:00 p.m.	No. 23	Elon	W 3–2	8–3–3 (3–2–1)	Dail Soccer Field (555); Raleigh, NC
October 26; 7:00 p.m.	No. 23	at Syracuse	L 0–3	8–4–3 (3–3–1)	SU Soccer Stadium (1,007); Syracuse, NY
November 1; 7:00 p.m		No. 2 Clemson	L 0–3	8–5–3 (3–4–1)	Dail Soccer Field (1,171); Raleigh, NC
ACC tournament
November 6; 2:00 p.m.	(5)	(12) Duke; First Round	W 2–1	9–5–3	Dail Soccer Field (377); Raleigh, NC
November 10; 3:00 p.m.	(5)	(4) Pittsburgh; Quarterfinals	L 1–2 ^{OT}	9–6–3	Ambrose Urbanic Field (1,010); Pittsburgh, PA
NCAA tournament
November 21; 7:00 p.m.		Coastal Carolina; First Round	L 2–3 ^{2OT}	9–7–3	Dail Soccer Field (538); Raleigh, NC
*Non-conference game. ^{#}Rankings from United Soccer Coaches. (#) Tournament seedings in parentheses.

== Awards and honors ==
Recipient	Award	Date	Ref.
David Loera	MAC Hermann Trophy Preseason Watchlist	August 1, 2019	
David Loera	All-ACC Second Team	November 13, 2019	

== Rankings ==
Ranking movement Legend: ██ Improvement in ranking. ██ Decrease in ranking. ██ Not ranked the previous week. RV=Others receiving votes.
Poll	Pre	Wk 1	Wk 2	Wk 3	Wk 4	Wk 5	Wk 6	Wk 7	Wk 8	Wk 9	Wk 10	Wk 11	Wk 12	Wk 13	Wk 14	Wk 15	Wk 16	Final
United Soccer	RV	RV	RV	RV		RV	20	23	23	RV	RV	RV	RV	None Released				RV
TopDrawer Soccer	22	22	22	24	RV				17	16	19	17						
