= Veljko Petković =

Veljko Petković may refer to:

- Veljko Petković (volleyball) (born 1977), Serbian volleyball player
- Veljko Petković (footballer) (born 2000), Serbian footballer
