= 2019 Louisville Cardinals men's soccer team =

American college soccer season

2019 Louisville Cardinals men's soccer

NCAA Tournament, Third Round
- Conference: Atlantic Coast Conference
- U. Soc. Coaches poll: No. 20
- TopDrawerSoccer.com: No. 14
- Record: 10–8–2 (3–4–1 ACC)
- Head coach: John Michael Hayden (1st season)
- Assistant coaches: Bryan Green (1st season); Donovan Dowling (1st season)
- Home stadium: Lynn Stadium

2019 ACC men's soccer standings
	Conf.					Overall
Team	W		L		T	W		L		T
Atlantic
No. 5 Clemson +	6	–	1	–	1	18	–	2	–	2
No. 3 Wake Forest +	6	–	2	–	0	16	–	5	–	2
NC State +	3	–	4	–	1	9	–	7	–	3
No. 20 Louisville +	3	–	4	–	1	10	–	8	–	2
Boston College +	2	–	4	–	2	9	–	6	–	3
Syracuse +	2	–	4	–	2	8	–	7	–	4
Coastal
No. 2 Virginia ‡	6	–	1	–	1	21	–	1	–	2
Pittsburgh +	4	–	3	–	1	10	–	8	–	2
Notre Dame +	3	–	5	–	0	10	–	8	–	1
North Carolina	3	–	5	–	0	7	–	8	–	3
No. 13 Virginia Tech +	2	–	4	–	2	10	–	6	–	3
Duke	2	–	5	–	1	7	–	9	–	2
‡ – 2019 ACC Tournament champion + – Invited to the 2019 NCAA tournament; As of 17 December 2019; Rankings from United Soccer Coaches; Source:The ACC

The 2019 Louisville Cardinals men's soccer team represented University of Louisville during the 2019 NCAA Division I men's soccer season. The Cardinals were led by head coach John Michael Hayden, in his first season. They played home games at Lynn Stadium. This was the team's 41st season playing organized men's college soccer and their 6th playing in the Atlantic Coast Conference.

== Background ==
The 2018 Louisville men's soccer team finished the season with a 11–5–3 overall record and a 4–2–2 ACC record. The Cardinals were seeded fourth–overall in the 2018 ACC Men's Soccer Tournament. The Cardinals upset the number two seeded North Carolina Tar Heels and number one seeded Wake Forest Demon Deacons along the way to their first ACC Men's Soccer Tournament title. The Cardinals earned an automatic bid into the 2018 NCAA Division I Men's Soccer Tournament for winning the ACC Tournament. As the fourth–overall seed in the tournament, Louisville was defeated by Michigan State in the Second Round.

At the end of the season, one Cardinal men's soccer player was selected in the 2019 MLS SuperDraft: Adam Wilson.

Head Coach Ken Lolla resigned after 13 years and a 155–77–39 record with the team. He was replaced by John Michael Hayden on December 27, 2018

== Player movement ==
=== Players leaving ===
Name	Number	Pos.	Height	Weight	Year	Hometown	Reason for departure
Adam Wilson	5	MF	6'1"	171	Senior	Auchterarder, Scotland	Declared for 2019 MLS SuperDraft; selected 39th overall by Toronto FC
Geoffrey Dee	6	MF	5'11"	167	Senior	Germantown, TN	Graduated
Tate Schmitt	10	FW	5'11"	161	Senior	Phoenix, AZ	Graduated
Watterson Young	21	FW	5'11"	190	Senior	Vestavia Hills, AL	Graduated

=== Players arriving ===
Name	Nat.	Hometown	Club	TDS Rating
Jack Fasteen; MF	USA	Louisville, KY	Derby City Rovers	3/5 stars
Weston King; GK	USA	Fruita, CO	Montverde Academy	2/5 stars
Aidan Liu; FW	USA	Naperville, IL	Sockers FC Academy	4/5 stars
Bradley Sample; MF	USA	Channahon, IL	Sockers FC Academy	2/5 stars
Isaiah Wynder; DF	USA	Louisville, KY	Javanon	2/5 stars

== Squad ==
=== Roster ===
Updated August 19, 2019

Note: Flags indicate national team as defined under FIFA eligibility rules; some limited exceptions apply. Players may hold more than one non-FIFA nationality.

No.	Pos.	Nation	Player
1	GK	(United States) USA	Will Meyer
2	DF	(England) ENG	William Portman
3	MF	(Guinea) GUI	Lamine Conte
4	FW	(Kenya) KEN	Haji Abdikadir
5	DF	(United States) USA	William Hirschman
6	DF	(Norway) NOR	Leonard Getz
7	FW	(Brazil) BRA	Pedro Fonseca
8	MF	(United States) USA	Jack Fasteen
9	FW	(Sweden) SWE	Emil Elveroth
10	FW	(Japan) JPN	Kino Ryosuke
11	MF	(United States) USA	Cameron Wheeler
12	MF	(Senegal) SEN	Cherif Dieye
13	MF	(United States) USA	Bradley Sample
14	MF	(Spain) ESP	Carlos Sanchis

No.	Pos.	Nation	Player
15	DF	(United States) USA	Connor Brazil
16	MF	(United States) USA	Diallo Irakoze
17	MF	(United States) USA	Elijah Amo
18	DF	(United States) USA	Jack Hickey
19	DF	(United States) USA	Isaiah Wynder
20	MF	(United States) USA	Cody Cochran
21	MF	(United States) USA	Neil Boyal
22	DF	(England) ENG	Liam Bennett
23	FW	(United States) USA	Izaiah Jennings
27	DF	(France) FRA	Louka Massett
28	GK	(United States) USA	William Howard
30	GK	(United States) USA	Weston King
31	GK	(United States) USA	Jake Gelnovatch

=== Team management ===
Position	Staff
Head coach	John Michael Hayden
Associate head coach	Bryan Green
Assistant Coach	Donovan Dowling
Volunteer Assistant Coach	Robbe Tarver
Director of Operations	James Kusak

== Schedule ==
Date Time, TV	Rank^{#}	Opponent^{#}	Result	Record	Site (Attendance) City, State
Exhibition
August 16*; 7:00 p.m.	No. 14	Lipscomb	W 2–1	– (–)	Lynn Stadium; Louisville, KY
August 21*; 7:00 p.m.	No. 14	at No. 2 Indiana	W 2–1	– (–)	Bill Armstrong Stadium; Bloomington, IN
August 24*; 7:00 p.m.	No. 14	UAB	W 3–0	– (–)	Lynn Stadium; Louisville, KY
Regular Season
August 30*; 7:30 p.m.	No. 14	Cleveland State	T 2–2 ^{2OT}	0–0–1 (0–0–0)	Lynn Stadium (1,115); Louisville, KY
September 3*; 7:30 p.m.		No. 9 Kentucky; Rivalry	W 3–0	1–0–1 (0–0–0)	Lynn Stadium (2,389); Louisville, KY
September 6*; 7:30 p.m.		at FAU	W 3–0	2–0–2 (0–0–0)	FAU Soccer Stadium (229); Boca Raton, FL
September 9*; 7:30 p.m.		at South Florida	L 0–2	2–1–1 (0–0–0)	Corbett Soccer Stadium (702); Tampa, FL
September 13; 7:00 p.m.	No. 20	at Syracuse	T 0–0 ^{2OT}	2–1–2 (0–0–1)	SU Soccer Stadium (1,756); Syracuse, NY
September 20; 7:30 p.m.		No. 17 Virginia Tech	W 2–1	3–1–2 (1–0–1)	Lynn Stadium (1,368); Louisville, KY
September 24*; 7:00 p.m.	No. 17	No. 2 Georgetown	W 1–0 ^{2OT}	4–1–2 (1–0–1)	Lynn Stadium (1,053); Louisville, KY
September 27; 7:30 p.m.	No. 17	NC State	L 1–2	4–2–2 (1–1–1)	Lynn Stadium (1,057); Louisville, KY
October 1*; 7:00 p.m.	No. 24	Belmont	W 3–0	5–2–2 (1–1–1)	Lynn Stadium (851); Louisville, KY
October 4; 7:00 p.m.	No. 24	at No. 1 Virginia	L 0–2	5–3–2 (1–2–1)	Klöckner Stadium (3,008); Charlottesville, VA
October 11; 7:00 p.m.		at No. 11 Clemson	L 0–4	5–4–2 (1–3–1)	Riggs Field (1,700); Clemson, SC
October 15*; 7:00 p.m.		Northern Kentucky	W 1–0 ^{OT}	6–4–2 (1–3–1)	Lynn Stadium (1,210); Louisville, KY
October 18; 7:30 p.m.		Boston College	W 3–2 ^{2OT}	7–4–2 (2–3–1)	Lynn Stadium (2,643); Louisville, KY
October 22*; 7:00 p.m.		Temple	L 1–2	7–5–2 (2–3–1)	Lynn Stadium (868); Louisville, KY
October 25; 6:00 p.m.		at No. 21 North Carolina	W 1–0	8–5–2 (3–3–1)	Fetzer Field (1,326); Chapel Hill, NC
November 1; 6:00 p.m.	No. 25	No. 7 Wake Forest	L 1–3	8–6–2 (3–4–1)	Lynn Stadium (1,310); Louisville, KY
ACC Tournament
November 6; 4:00 p.m.	(6)	(11) No. 22 Virginia Tech; First Round	L 0–2	8–7–2	Lynn Stadium (255); Louisville, KY
NCAA Tournament
November 21; 7:30 p.m.		South Florida; First Round	W 4–1	9–7–2	Lynn Stadium (402); Louisville, KY
November 24; 4:00 p.m.		at (14) No. 18 UC Davis; Second Round	W 1–0	10–7–2	Aggie Soccer Field (1,703); Davis, CA
December 1; 12:00 p.m.		at (3) No. 2 Georgetown; Third Round	L 1–5	10–8–2	Shaw Field (773); Washington, D.C.
*Non-conference game. ^{#}Rankings from United Soccer Coaches. (#) Tournament seedings in parentheses.

== Awards and honors ==
Recipient	Award	Date	Ref.
Emil Elveroth	MAC Hermann Trophy Preseason Watchlist	August 1, 2019	
Jake Gelnovatch	ACC Defensive Player of the Week	September 9, 2019	
Cherif Dieye	ACC Offensive Player of the Week	September 23, 2019	
Cherif Dieye	All-ACC Second Team	November 13, 2019	

== 2020 MLS SuperDraft ==
Player	Team	Round	Pick #	Position
Cherif Dieye	New York Red Bulls	1	15	MF

== Rankings ==
Ranking movement Legend: ██ Improvement in ranking. ██ Decrease in ranking. ██ Not ranked the previous week. RV=Others receiving votes.
Poll	Pre	Wk 1	Wk 2	Wk 3	Wk 4	Wk 5	Wk 6	Wk 7	Wk 8	Wk 9	Wk 10	Wk 11	Wk 12	Wk 13	Wk 14	Wk 15	Wk 16	Final
United Soccer	14	RV	20	RV	17	24	RV	RV	RV	25	RV		RV	None Released				20
TopDrawer Soccer	9	9	8	5	10	10	11	5	20	20	22	20	24	RV	12	14	14	14
