= John Michael Hayden =

American soccer player and coach

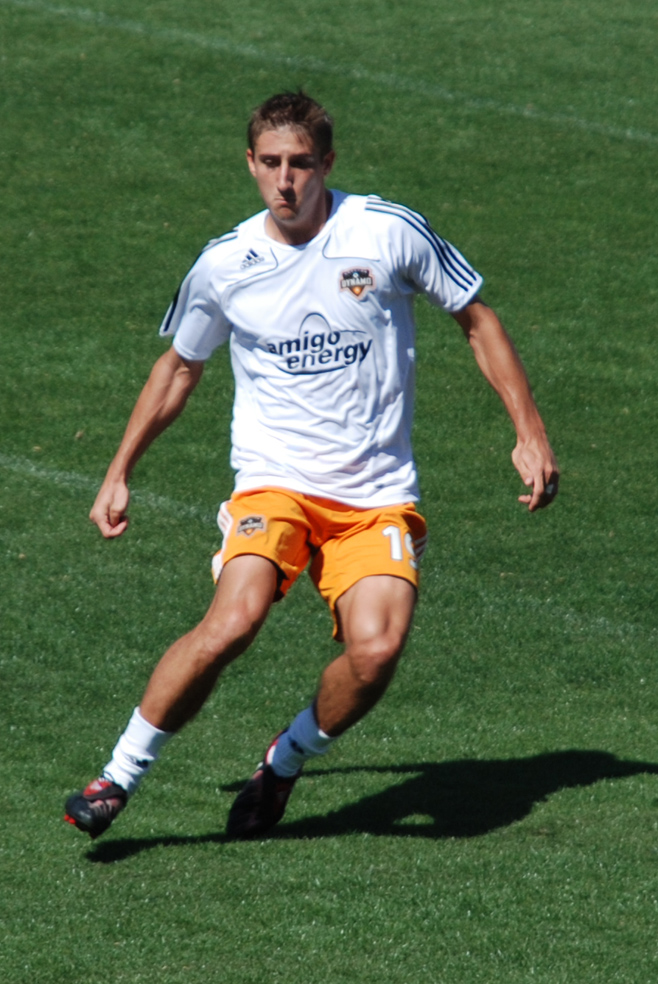

Personal information
- Full name: John Michael Hayden
- Date of birth: April 27, 1984 (age 42)
- Place of birth: Louisville, Kentucky, United States
- Height: 5 ft 8 in (1.73 m)
- Position: Central midfielder

College career
Years	Team	Apps	(Gls)
2002–2006	Indiana Hoosiers	88	(13)

Senior career*
Years	Team	Apps	(Gls)
2002–2003	West Michigan Edge	9	(1)
2004	Indiana Blast	12	(2)
2005	Chicago Fire Premier	12	(1)
2006	Fort Wayne Fever	14	(0)
2007–2009	Houston Dynamo	0	(0)
2009	→ Cleveland City Stars (loan)	7	(0)
2010	Louisville Lightning (indoor)	12	(11)

Managerial career
- 2008–2011: Mockingbird Valley SC (Director)
- 2008–2010: Chicago Fire Juniors: Kentucky (Director)
- 2012: Louisville Cardinals (assistant)
- 2013–2014: Lipscomb Bisons (assistant)
- 2015: Xavier Musketeers (assistant)
- 2016–2018: Louisville Cardinals (assistant)
- 2019–: Louisville Cardinals
- * Club domestic league appearances and goals as of January 28, 2021

John Michael Hayden (born April 27, 1984, in Louisville, Kentucky) is a former American soccer player and current head coach of the men's team of the University of Louisville.

== Playing career ==
=== Youth and college ===
Hayden attended Trinity High School in Louisville, where he played on the school soccer team. He was a two-time Parade Magazine All-American and was the 2000–01 Kentucky Gatorade Player of the Year.

Hayden played college soccer at Indiana University. After redshirting his freshman season, Hayden began to see regular time with the Hoosiers in 2003. He helped Indiana win back-to-back NCAA titles in 2003 and 2004 as well as Big Ten Conference Tournament titles in 2003 and 2006. Hayden was named second team All-Big Ten in 2004 and first team All-Big Ten in 2006. He also made the NCAA College Cup All-Tournament Team during 2004.

While at Indiana, Hayden spent the collegiate off-season with several teams in the USL Premier Development League (PDL; now known as USL League Two). In 2002, he played with the West Michigan Edge. In 2004, he spent the season with the Indiana Blast and in 2005 with the Chicago Fire Premier. Hayden signed with the Fort Wayne Fever for the 2006 season.

=== Professional ===
On January 12, 2007, the Houston Dynamo selected Hayden in the first round (13th overall) in the 2007 MLS SuperDraft. He made his professional debut on July 10 in a 1–0 loss to the Charleston Battery in a U.S. Open Cup match. The Dynamo would go on to win MLS Cup 2007, but Hayden did not appear in the MLS regular season or playoffs.

During the 2008 season, Hayden made 2 total appearances for the Dynamo, once in the Open Cup and once in the CONCACAF Champions League.

He was loaned out to USL-1 side Cleveland City Stars in May 2009. While at Cleveland he landed USL-1 team of the week accolades following performances against the Portland Timbers and the Minnesota Thunder.

On July 1, 2009, Hayden made his first appearance of the 2009 season for Houston against the Austin Aztex in a 2–0 in the Open Cup. Hayden played in subsequent cup games for the Dynamo against the Charleston Battery, a 4–0 win in which Hayden recorded 2 assists, and Seattle Sounders FC, a 2–1 loss. He also made 3 appearances in the Champions League group stage. He once again did not appear in a MLS match.

ON November 25, 2009, Hayden was waived by Houston.

In January 2010, Hayden signed with his hometown's Louisville Lightning of the Professional Arena Soccer League. He also returned to the Lightning for the full 2010–11 season.

== Coaching career ==
During his playing career, Hayden served as director for Mockingbird Valley SC and Chicago Fire Juniors: Kentucky. In 2012, Hayden was hired as the assistant coach for the University of Louisville men's soccer program. During the 2012 season, the Cardinals won the Big East Conference regular season title and advanced to the NCAA Tournament Elite Eight.

Hayden left Louisville to become an assistant at Lipscomb University in 2013. While at Lipscomb Hayden helped the Bisons to an Atlantic Sun Conference regular season title in 2014. The Bison were 21–13–4 overall during his two years in Nashville.

On April 10, 2015, Hayden was hired by Xavier University as their associate head coach for the Musketeers men's soccer program. During his one season with Xavier, the Musketeers had a 12–6–1 record.

In 2016 Hayden returned to the University of Louisville as an assistant coach. During his 3 seasons as the assistant, Louisville reached 3 NCAA Tournaments and the 2018 ACC Men's Soccer Tournament.

On December 27, 2018, Louisville hired Hayden as the head coach for the men's soccer program, the 5th in program history.

=== Head coaching record ===
Record table
Season	Team	Overall	Conference	Standing	Postseason
Louisville (Atlantic Coast) (2019–present)
2019	Louisville	10–8–2	3–4–1	4th (Atlantic)	NCAA Third Round
2020	Louisville	5–8–1	5–6–1	5th (Atlantic)	
2021	Louisville	10–7–1	5–3–0	2nd (Atlantic)	NCAA First Round
2022	Louisville	9–6–3	4–3–1	3rd (Atlantic)	NCAA First Round
2023	Louisville	12–6–3	2–4–2	4th (Atlantic)	NCAA Second Round
2024	Louisville	6–7–4	0–5–3	15th	
Louisville:		52–42–14	19–25–8		
Total:		52–42–14			
National champion Postseason invitational champion Conference regular season champion Conference regular season and conference tournament champion Division regular season champion Division regular season and conference tournament champion Conference tournament champion

== Career statistics ==
Club	Season	League			Open Cup		Playoffs		Continental		Total	
Club	Season	Division	Apps	Goals	Apps	Goals	Apps	Goals	Apps	Goals	Apps	Goals
West Michigan Edge	2002	PDL	9	1	—		—		—		9	1
Indiana Blast	2004	PDL	12	2	—		—		—		12	2
Chicago Fire Premier	2005	PDL	12	1	0	0	0	0	—		12	1
Fort Wayne Fever	2006	PDL	14	0	—		—		—		14	0
Houston Dynamo	2007	MLS	0	0	1	0	0	0	0	0	1	0
Houston Dynamo	2008	MLS	0	0	1	0	0	0	1 (Note: Appearances in CONCACAF Champions League)	0	2	0
Houston Dynamo	2009	MLS	0	0	3	0	0	0	3	0	6	0
Houston Dynamo	Dynamo Total		0	0	5	0	0	0	4	0	9	0
Cleveland City Stars (loan)	2009	USL-2	7	0	0	0	0	0	—		7	0
Career Total			54	4	5	0	0	0	4	0	63	4

== Personal life ==
Hayden was born and raised in Louisville, Kentucky. He attended Trinity High School and Indiana University.

On December 1, 2007, Hayden married Hollie Minogue, who played women's soccer at Louisville. Together they have 2 sons.

== Honors ==
Indiana University

- NCAA Men's Division I Soccer Championship: 2004
- Big Ten Conference Tournament: 2003, 2006
- Big Ten Conference Regular Season: 2002, 2003, 2004, 2006

Houston Dynamo

- MLS Cup: 2007
