= 2019 Syracuse Orange men's soccer team =

NCAA soccer season

2019 Syracuse Orange men's soccer

NCAA Tournament, Second Round
- Conference: Atlantic Coast Conference
- U. Soc. Coaches poll: No. RV
- TopDrawerSoccer.com: No. RV
- Record: 8–7–5 (2–4–2 ACC)
- Head coach: Ian McIntyre (7th season)
- Assistant coaches: Jukka Masalin (7th season); Sean Lawlor (1st season)
- Home stadium: SU Soccer Stadium

2019 ACC men's soccer standings
	Conf.					Overall
Team	W		L		T	W		L		T
Atlantic
No. 5 Clemson +	6	–	1	–	1	18	–	2	–	2
No. 3 Wake Forest +	6	–	2	–	0	16	–	5	–	2
NC State +	3	–	4	–	1	9	–	7	–	3
No. 20 Louisville +	3	–	4	–	1	10	–	8	–	2
Boston College +	2	–	4	–	2	9	–	6	–	3
Syracuse +	2	–	4	–	2	8	–	7	–	4
Coastal
No. 2 Virginia ‡	6	–	1	–	1	21	–	1	–	2
Pittsburgh +	4	–	3	–	1	10	–	8	–	2
Notre Dame +	3	–	5	–	0	10	–	8	–	1
North Carolina	3	–	5	–	0	7	–	8	–	3
No. 13 Virginia Tech +	2	–	4	–	2	10	–	6	–	3
Duke	2	–	5	–	1	7	–	9	–	2
‡ – 2019 ACC Tournament champion + – Invited to the 2019 NCAA tournament; As of 17 December 2019; Rankings from United Soccer Coaches; Source:The ACC

The 2019 Syracuse Orange men's soccer team represented Syracuse University during the 2019 NCAA Division I men's soccer season. It was the program's 96th season and 7th in the Atlantic Coast Conference. The Orange were led by Ian McIntyre, is in his tenth year.

== Background ==
The 2018 Syracuse men's soccer team finished the season with a 7–7–4 overall record and a 1–4–3 ACC record. The Orange were seeded tenth–overall in the 2018 ACC Men's Soccer Tournament, where they lost to Virginia Tech in the first round. The Orange earned an at-large bid to the 2018 NCAA Division I Men's Soccer Tournament. As the sixteenth overall seed in the tournament, the Orange lost to eventual runners up Akron in their first match of the tournament.

At the end of the 2018 season, two Orange men's soccer players wer selected in the 2019 MLS SuperDraft: Tajon Buchanan and Kamal Miller.

== Player movement ==
=== Players leaving ===
Name	Number	Pos.	Height	Weight	Year	Hometown	Reason for departure
Jan Breitenmoser	2	MF	5'7"	159	Senior	Wil, Switzerland	Graduated
Kamal Miller	5	DF	6'0"	185	Senior	Pickering, Canada	Declared for 2019 MLS SuperDraft; selected 27th overall by Orlando City SC.
Len Zeugner	6	DF	6'4"	191	Graduate Student	Münster, Germany	Graduated
Jonathan Hagman	8	MF	6'0"	174	Senior	Enebyberg, Sweden	Graduated
Hugo Delhommelle	10	FW/MF	5'11"	170	Senior	Rennes, France	Graduated
John-Austin Ricks	11	DF/MF	5'10"	144	Senior	Utica, NY	Graduated
Tajon Buchanan	17	FW	6'0"	152	Sophomore	Brampton, Canada	Declared for 2019 MLS SuperDraft; selected 9th overall by New England Revolution.
Hendrik Hilpert	25	GK	6'0"	175	Senior	Eiterfeld, Germany	Graduated

=== Players arriving ===
Name	Nat.	Hometown	Club	TDS Rating
Quinton Becker; DF	USA	Niskayuna, NY	Black Watch Premier	3/5 stars
Logan McGraw; MF	USA	Brooklyn, NY	BW Gottschee	3/5 stars
Merjan Ozisik; MF	USA	Niskayuna, NY	Black Watch Premier	3/5 stars
Andres Quevedo; GK	USA	Dallas, TX	FC Dallas (Youth)	2/5 stars
Amferny Arias Sinclair; MF	CRC	San José, Costa Rica	Oce de Abril	N/A

== Squad ==
=== Roster ===
Updated: August 19, 2019

Note: Flags indicate national team as defined under FIFA eligibility rules; some limited exceptions apply. Players may hold more than one non-FIFA nationality.

No.	Pos.	Nation	Player
0	GK	USA	Andres Quevedo
1	GK	USA	Jake Leahy
2	MF	CRC	Amferny Sinclair
3	DF	NOR	Sondre Norheim
4	DF	GER	Noah Singelmann
5	DF	HKG	Matt Orr
6	MF	USA	Julio Fulcar
7	FW	CAN	Severin Soerlie
8	MF	CAN	Simon Triantafillou
9	FW	CAN	Massimo Ferrin
10	MF	CAN	Ryan Raposo
11	MF	CAN	Hilli Goldhar
12	DF	USA	John-Austin Ricks

No.	Pos.	Nation	Player
13	DF	USA	Nikolas Steiner
14	DF	USA	Michael Lantry
15	MF	USA	Merjan Ozisik
16	MF	USA	Logan McGraw
18	DF	CAN	Nyal Higgins
19	FW	GLP	Luther Archimède
20	MF	USA	Brian Hawkins
21	FW	USA	Mickey Watson
22	DF	USA	Dylan McDonald
23	DF	USA	Quinn Becker
24	DF	USA	Alphonso Joe
25	GK	SUI	Christian Miesch
30	GK	USA	Sam Gomez

=== Team management ===
Position	Staff
Athletic Director	John Wildhack
Head coach	Ian McIntyre
Associate Head Coach	Jukka Masalin
Assistant Coach	Sean Lawlor
Volunteer Assistant Coach	Michael Flynn
Director of Operations	Todd Cook
Volunteer Assistant	Andrew Coughlin
Assistant Athletic Trainer	Mike Mangano

== Schedule ==
Date Time, TV	Rank^{#}	Opponent^{#}	Result	Record	Site (Attendance) City, State
Exhibition
August 18*; 7:00 p.m.		Niagara	W 5–0	– (–)	SU Soccer Stadium; Syracuse, NY
August 21*; 7:00 p.m.		Hofstra	W 4–2	– (–)	SU Soccer Stadium; Syracuse, NY
August 24*; 7:00 p.m.		at Penn State	W 1–0	– (–)	Jeffrey Field; State College, PA
Regular season
August 30*; 4:00 p.m.		at No. 13 Georgetown	L 1–3	0–1–0 (0–0–0)	Shaw Field (1,121); Washington, D.C.
September 2*; 7:00 p.m.		Binghamton	W 3–1	1–1–0 (0–0–0)	SU Soccer Stadium (1,169); Syracuse, NY
September 6*; 7:00 p.m.		Yale	T 1–1 ^{2OT}	1–1–1 (0–0–0)	SU Soccer Stadium (1,765); Syracuse, NY
September 8*; 7:00 p.m.		No. 22 New Hampshire	T 2–2 ^{2OT}	1–1–2 (0–0–0)	SU Soccer Stadium (721); Syracuse, NY
September 13; 7:00 p.m.		No. 20 Louisville	T 0–0 ^{2OT}	1–1–3 (0–0–1)	SU Soccer Stadium (1,756); Syracuse, NY
September 17*; 7:00 p.m.		Cornell	W 3–2 ^{OT}	2–1–3 (0–0–1)	SU Soccer Stadium (521); Syracuse, NY
September 21; 7:30 p.m.		at No. 1 Wake Forest	L 0–1	2–2–3 (0–1–1)	Spry Stadium (3,143); Winston-Salem, NC
September 24*; 7:00 p.m.		at Colgate; Rivalry	W 1–0	3–2–3 (0–1–1)	Beyer-Small '76 Field (425); Hamilton, NY
September 27; 7:00 p.m.		Pittsburgh	T 1–1 ^{2OT}	3–2–4 (0–1–2)	SU Soccer Stadium (1,706); Syracuse, NY
October 1*; 7:00 p.m.		Albany	Cancelled	3–2–4 (0–1–2)	SU Soccer Stadium; Syracuse, NY
October 4; 7:00 p.m.		at No. 18 Duke	L 0–4	3–3–4 (0–2–2)	Koskinen Stadium (759); Durham, NC
October 12; 7:00 p.m.		at No. 18 North Carolina	W 4–3	4–3–4 (1–2–2)	Fetzer Field (876); Chapel Hill, NC
October 15*; 7:00 p.m.		Connecticut	W 1–0	5–3–4 (1–2–2)	SU Soccer Stadium (342); Syracuse, NY
October 19; 7:00 p.m.		No. 8 Clemson	L 4–7	5–4–4 (1–3–2)	SU Soccer Stadium (1,342); Syracuse, NY
October 22; 4:00 p.m.		SUNY Morrisville	W 11–0	6–4–4 (1–3–2)	SU Soccer Stadium (64); Syracuse, NY
October 26; 7:00 p.m.		No. 23 NC State	W 3–0	7–4–4 (2–3–2)	SU Soccer Stadium (1,007); Syracuse, NY
November 1; 6:00 p.m.		at Boston College	L 1–2	7–5–4 (2–4–2)	Newton Soccer Complex (413); Chestnut Hill, MA
ACC Tournament
November 5; 4:00 p.m.	(10)	at (7) North Carolina; First Round	T 0–0 (5–3 PKs) ^{2OT}	7–5–5	Fetzer Field (766); Chapel Hill, NC
November 10; 1:00 p.m.	(10)	at (2) No. 4 Virginia; Quarterfinals	L 1–2	7–6–5	Klöckner Stadium (1,525); Charlottesville, VA
NCAA Tournament
November 21; 7:00 p.m.		Rhode Island; First Round	W 3–2	8–6–5	SU Soccer Stadium (472); Syracuse, NY
November 24; 5:00 p.m.		at (16) No. 14 St. John's; Second Round	L 1–2	8–7–5	Belson Stadium (457); New York, NY
*Non-conference game. ^{#}Rankings from United Soccer Coaches. (#) Tournament seedings in parentheses.

== Awards and honors ==
Recipient	Award	Date	Ref.
Ryan Raposo	ACC Offensive Player of the Week	October 14, 2019	
Ryan Raposo	All-ACC First Team	November 13, 2019	

== Rankings ==
Ranking movement Legend: ██ Improvement in ranking. ██ Decrease in ranking. ██ Not ranked the previous week. RV=Others receiving votes.
Poll	Pre	Wk 1	Wk 2	Wk 3	Wk 4	Wk 5	Wk 6	Wk 7	Wk 8	Wk 9	Wk 10	Wk 11	Wk 12	Wk 13	Wk 14	Wk 15	Wk 16	Final
United Soccer										RV				None Released				RV
TopDrawer Soccer	RV	RV								RV	25	25	25	RV	RV	RV	RV	RV

== 2020 MLS Super Draft ==
Player	Team	Round	Pick #	Position
Ryan Raposo	Vancouver Whitecaps FC	1	4	MF
Nyal Higgins	Toronto FC	1	19	DF
