= 2019 Notre Dame Fighting Irish men's soccer team =

American college soccer season

2019 Notre Dame Fighting Irish men's soccer

Mike Berticelli Memorial Tournament champions

NCAA Tournament, First Round
- Conference: Atlantic Coast Conference
- Record: 10–8–1 (3–5–0 ACC)
- Head coach: Chad Riley (2nd season)
- Assistant coaches: Ryan Fahey (2nd season); Brian Plotkin (2nd season)
- Home stadium: Alumni Stadium

2019 ACC men's soccer standings
	Conf.					Overall
Team	W		L		T	W		L		T
Atlantic
No. 5 Clemson +	6	–	1	–	1	18	–	2	–	2
No. 3 Wake Forest +	6	–	2	–	0	16	–	5	–	2
NC State +	3	–	4	–	1	9	–	7	–	3
No. 20 Louisville +	3	–	4	–	1	10	–	8	–	2
Boston College +	2	–	4	–	2	9	–	6	–	3
Syracuse +	2	–	4	–	2	8	–	7	–	4
Coastal
No. 2 Virginia ‡	6	–	1	–	1	21	–	1	–	2
Pittsburgh +	4	–	3	–	1	10	–	8	–	2
Notre Dame +	3	–	5	–	0	10	–	8	–	1
North Carolina	3	–	5	–	0	7	–	8	–	3
No. 13 Virginia Tech +	2	–	4	–	2	10	–	6	–	3
Duke	2	–	5	–	1	7	–	9	–	2
‡ – 2019 ACC Tournament champion + – Invited to the 2019 NCAA tournament; As of 17 December 2019; Rankings from United Soccer Coaches; Source:The ACC

The 2019 Notre Dame Fighting Irish men's soccer team represented University of Notre Dame during the 2019 NCAA Division I men's soccer season. It was the program's 42nd season. It was the program's 7th season competing in the Atlantic Coast Conference. The Fighting Irish were led by head coach Chad Riley, in his second year.

== Background ==
The 2018 Notre Dame men's soccer team finished the season with an 11–7–3 overall record and a 4–3–1 ACC record. The Fighting Irish were seeded fifth–overall in the 2018 ACC Men's Soccer Tournament, where they lost to eventual champions Louisville in the quarterfinals. The Fighting Irish earned an at-large bid into the 2018 NCAA Division I Men's Soccer Tournament for the sixth season in a row. As the seventh–overall seed in the tournament, Notre Dame defeated Michigan and ACC foe Virginia before falling to Indiana in the quarterfinals.

At the end of the season, one Fighting Irish soccer player was selected in the 2019 MLS SuperDraft: Tommy McCabe.

== Player movement ==
=== Players leaving ===
Name	Number	Pos.	Height	Weight	Year	Hometown	Reason for departure
Ryan Krutz	1	GK	6'0"	176	Senior	Norman, OK	Graduated
Sean MacLeod	6	MF/FW	6'2"	157	Senior	Troon, Scotland	Graduated
Blake Townes	10	MF	6'1"	166	Senior	Canton, MI	Graduated
Sean Dedrick	11	DF	6'1"	167	Senior	Wilton, CT	Graduated
Tommy McCabe	16	MF	5'11"	174	Junior	South Orange, NJ	Declared for 2019 MLS SuperDraft; drafted 28th overall by FC Cincinnati
Thomas Ueland	21	FW/MF	5'11"	158	Senior	Lexington, KY	Graduated
Patrick Berneski	25	DF	6'3"	195	Senior	Warrington, PA	Graduated

=== Players arriving ===
Name	Nat.	Hometown	Club	TDS Rating
Mohammad Abualnadi; DF	USA	Leawood, KS	Sporting Kansas City (Academy)	3/5 stars
Zach Dedrick; DF	USA	Wilton, CT	Beachside SC	3/5 stars
Thomas Deslongchamps; GK	USA	Whitefish Bay, WI	FC United (Illinois)	3/5 stars
Reese Mayer; DF	USA	Owings Mills, MD	Baltimore Armour	3/5 stars
Ethan O'Brien; MF	IRL	Dublin, Ireland	Columbus Crew Academy	3/5 stars
Michael Pellegrino; MF	USA	Wenonah, NJ	Philadelphia Union	3/5 stars

== Squad ==
=== Roster ===
Updated August 20, 2019

Note: Flags indicate national team as defined under FIFA eligibility rules; some limited exceptions apply. Players may hold more than one non-FIFA nationality.

No.	Pos.	Nation	Player
0	GK	USA	Thomas Deslongchamps
1	GK	USA	Duncan Turnbull
2	DF	USA	Philip Quinton
3	FW	USA	Spencer Farina
4	DF	USA	Brian Finn
5	MF	FRA	Félicien Dumas
6	MF	USA	Michael Pellegrino
7	MF	USA	Jack Casey
8	MF	USA	Nick Cullen
9	FW	USA	John Rea
10	MF	USA	Aiden McFadden
11	FW	USA	Simon Roennecke
12	MF	USA	Bryan Silver
14	MF	USA	Michael Lynch
15	DF	USA	Mohammad Abualnadi

No.	Pos.	Nation	Player
16	DF	USA	Reese Mayer
17	DF	USA	Senan Farrelly
18	MF	USA	Townsend Meyer
19	GK	USA	Keagan McLaughlin
20	MF	USA	Patrick Coleman
21	MF	IRL	Ethan O'Brien
22	FW	USA	Ian Aschieris
24	DF	USA	Jacob Huber
25	DF	USA	Zach Dedrick
26	MF	USA	Ben Giacobello
27	FW	USA	Jack Lynn
28	FW	USA	Tyler Shea
29	MF	CAN	Mohamed Omar
30	GK	USA	Sam Guianane

== Team management ==
Position	Staff
Athletic Director	Jack Swarbrick
Head coach	Chad Riely
Assistant Coach	Ryan Fahey
Assistant Coach	Brian Plotkin
Volunteer Assistant Coach	Adam LaPlaca

== Schedule ==
Date Time, TV	Rank^{#}	Opponent^{#}	Result	Record	Site City, State
Exhibition
August 19*; 2:00 p.m.	No. 9	Bethel	Completed	– (–)	Alumni Stadium; South Bend, IN
August 21*; 7:00 p.m.	No. 9	at Marquette	L 1–2	– (–)	Valley Fields; Milwaukee, WI
August 28*; 5:00 p.m.	No. 9	Western Michigan	T 1–1	– (–)	Alumni Stadium; South Bend, IN
Regular Season
August 31*; 7:00 p.m.	No. 9	at Saint Louis	W 3–2	1–0–0 (0–0–0)	Hermann Stadium (5,942); Saint Louis, MO
September 6*; 7:00 p.m.	No. 11	Seattle; Mike Berticelli Memorial Tournament	W 4–2	2–0–0 (0–0–0)	Alumni Stadium (686); South Bend, IN
September 8*; 7:00 p.m.	No. 11	Denver; Mike Berticelli Memorial Tournament	W 1–0	3–0–0 (0–0–0)	Alumni Stadium (641); South Bend, IN
September 13; 7:00 p.m.	No. 10	No. 13 Clemson	L 2–4	3–1–0 (0–1–0)	Alumni Stadium (1,078); South Bend, IN
September 17*; 7:00 p.m.	No. 16	at No. 4 Indiana; Rivalry	T 1–1 ^{2OT}	3–1–1 (0–1–0)	Bill Armstrong Stadium (2,392); Bloomington, IN
September 20; 6:00 p.m.	No. 16	at No. 11 North Carolina	L 0–2	3–2–1 (0–2–0)	Fetzer Field (2,375); Chapel Hill, NC
September 24*; 7:00 p.m.	No. 21	at Michigan State	W 1–0	4–2–1 (0–2–0)	DeMartin Soccer Complex (616); East Lansing, MI
September 28; 11:00 a.m.	No. 21	No. 3 Virginia	L 0–1	4–3–1 (0–3–0)	Alumni Stadium (646); South Bend, IN
October 1*; 7:00 p.m.		DePaul	W 1–0	5–3–1 (0–3–0)	Alumni Stadium (404); South Bend, IN
October 4; 6:00 p.m.		at NC State	L 0–2	5–4–1 (0–4–0)	Dail Soccer Field (1,211); Raleigh, NC
October 8*; 7:00 p.m.		Purdue Fort Wayne	W 8–0	6–4–1 (0–4–0)	Alumni Stadium (257); South Bend, IN
October 11; 6:00 p.m.		No. 21 Duke	W 1–0	7–4–1 (1–4–0)	Alumni Stadium (748); South Bend, IN
October 18; 5:30 p.m.		at Virginia Tech	L 1–2	7–5–1 (1–5–0)	Thompson Field (822); Blacksburg, VA
October 22*; 7:00 p.m.		Michigan	L 0–1	7–6–1 (1–5–0)	Alumni Stadium (585); South Bend, IN
October 26; 7:00 p.m.		at No. 2 Wake Forest	W 1–0	8–6–1 (2–5–0)	Spry Stadium (3,022); Winston-Salem, NC
November 1; 7:00 p.m.		Pittsburgh	W 1–0	9–6–1 (3–5–0)	Alumni Stadium (584); South Bend, IN
ACC Tournament
November 5; 2:00 p.m.	(8)	(9) Boston College; First Round	W 2–1 ^{2OT}	10–6–1	Alumni Stadium (117); South Bend, IN
November 10; 7:00 p.m.	(8)	at (1) No. 2 Clemson; Quarterfinals	L 0–3	10–7–1	Riggs Field (1,703); Clemson, SC
NCAA Tournament
November 21; 7:00 p.m.		Wright State; First Round	L 2–3	10–8–1	Alumni Stadium (274); South Bend, IN
*Non-conference game. ^{#}Rankings from United Soccer Coaches. (#) Tournament seedings in parentheses.

== Awards and honors ==
Recipient	Award	Date	Ref.
Felicien Dumas	ACC Defensive Player of the Week	October 14, 2019	
Duncan Turnbull	ACC Defensive Player of the Week	October 28, 2019	
Felicien Dumas	ACC Defensive Player of the Week	November 4, 2019	
Jack Lynn	All-ACC Second Team	November 13, 2019	
Felicien Dumas	All-ACC Third Team	November 13, 2019	

== 2020 MLS Super Draft ==
Player	Team	Round	Pick #	Position
Felicien Dumas	New York City FC	2	48	DF
Duncan Turnball	Houston Dynamo	3	70	GK

== Rankings ==
Ranking movement Legend: ██ Improvement in ranking. ██ Decrease in ranking. ██ Not ranked the previous week. RV=Others receiving votes.
Poll	Pre	Wk 1	Wk 2	Wk 3	Wk 4	Wk 5	Wk 6	Wk 7	Wk 8	Wk 9	Wk 10	Wk 11	Wk 12	Wk 13	Wk 14	Wk 15	Wk 16	Final
United Soccer	9	11	10	16	21	RV	RV	RV		RV	RV	RV		None Released				
TopDrawer Soccer	16	16	17	15	13	20	RV	RV	19	22	16	15	20	23				
