= Giacomo Piccardo =

Italian footballer

Personal information
- Date of birth: 11 July 1999 (age 27)
- Place of birth: Genoa, Italy
- Height: 1.85 m (6 ft 1 in)
- Position: Goalkeeper

Youth career
- –2018: Sampdoria

College career
Years	Team	Apps	(Gls)
2019–2020	Boston College Eagles		
2020–2022	Davidson Wildcats		

Senior career*
Years	Team	Apps	(Gls)
2018–2019	Sampdoria	0	(0)
2018–2019	→ Albissola (loan)	17	(0)
- * Club domestic league appearances and goals as of 6 May 2019

Giacomo Piccardo (born 11 July 1999) is an Italian football player.

== Club career ==
=== Sampdoria ===
He is a product of Sampdoria youth teams and started playing for their Under-19 squad in the 2016–17 season.

==== Loan to Albissola ====
On 10 July 2018, Piccardo joined to Serie C club Albissola on a season-long loan deal. On 21 October he made his professional debut in Serie C for Albissola in a 2–0 away defeat against Arezzo as a starter. On 7 November he kept his first clean sheet for Albissola in a 1–0 away win over Novara. Four days later, on 11 November, he kept his second consecutive clean sheet in a 1–0 home win over Juventus U23. On 25 November he kept his third clean sheet in another 1–0 win over Pro Piacenza. Piccardo ended his season-long loan to Albissola with 17 appearances, 3 clean sheets and 21 goals conceded.

== Career statistics ==
=== Club ===
As of 6 May 2019

Club	Season	League			Cup		Europe		Other		Total	
Club	Season	League	Apps	Goals	Apps	Goals	Apps	Goals	Apps	Goals	Apps	Goals
Albissola (loan)	2018–19	Serie C	17	0	0	0	—		—		17	0
Career total			17	0	0	0	—		—		17	0
