= Mike Brizendine =

American soccer coach

Personal information
- Full name: Michael Brizendine
- Date of birth: April 13, 1977 (age 49)
- Place of birth: McLean, Virginia
- Height: 6 ft 0 in (1.83 m)
- Position: Forward

Team information
- Current team: Virginia Tech Hokies (head coach)

College career
Years	Team	Apps	(Gls)
1995–1998	James Madison Dukes		

Managerial career
- 2001–2003: Bridgewater Eagles
- 2004–2009: Virginia Tech Hokies (assistant)
- 2009–: Virginia Tech Hokies

Mike Brizendine is the head men's soccer coach at Virginia Tech. He has held that position since the 2009 season, in which the Hokies posted a 5-12-2 record. He had previously served as the top assistant coach at Virginia Tech from 2004 to 2009. As a member of the staff, Virginia Tech reached the 2007 college cup. He was named NSCAA's Atlantic Region Coach of the Year in 2007 for his efforts. From 2001 to 2003, he coached at Bridgewater College, posting a 23-13 overall mark there. He was named the Old Dominion Athletic Conference coach of the year for his efforts.

He was also an assistant coach at Ferrum College in 1999. He played college soccer at James Madison University from 1995 to 1998.
