= Veljko Petković (footballer) =

American soccer player (born 2000)

Personal information
- Date of birth: September 5, 2000 (age 26)
- Place of birth: Queens, New York, United States
- Position: Midfielder

Team information
- Current team: Minnesota United FC 2
- Number: 80

Youth career
- 2009–2015: Woodhaven SC
- 2015–2019: New York City FC

College career
| Years | Team | Apps | (Gls) |
| 2019–2021 | Pittsburgh Panthers | 48 | (20) |

Senior career*
| Years | Team | Apps | (Gls) |
| 2022– | Minnesota United FC 2 | 17 | (0) |
- * Club domestic league appearances and goals as of September 18, 2022

Veljko Petković (born September 5, 2000) is an American soccer player who plays as a midfielder for Minnesota United FC 2. He is the 2020 recipient of the TopDrawerSoccer.com National Player of the Year Award, a national recognition for the top college soccer player in the United States.

== Early life ==
Petković was born in 2000 to Serbian parents, Nataša and Bojan Petkovic, in the Queens borough of New York City. He is one of three children and attended Maspeth High School.

== Career ==
=== Youth and college ===
Petković played youth soccer for the Woodhaven Soccer Club in Queens before joining the New York City FC academy in 2015. Upon graduating high school, he signed a National Letter of Intent to play collegiate soccer for the University of Pittsburgh in the Atlantic Coast Conference ahead of the 2019 NCAA Division I men's soccer season. Immediately upon joining Pittsburgh, Petković became a starter. During his freshman year, he made 19 appearances, garnering 15 starts and tallying six goals and five assists, the second best in each category on the team. Petković's performance during the 2019 season helped him earn All-ACC Third Team and All-ACC Freshman Team honors. During his freshman year, he helped Pittsburgh earn their first berth into the NCAA Division I Men's Soccer Tournament since 1965, the longest active drought in the nation for a program that had previously qualified for the NCAA Tournament.

Petković had a breakout season his sophomore year of college. During the 2020 NCAA Division I men's soccer season, Petković finished as one of the top goal scorers in the country, tallying nine goals and ranking second in the ACC and eighth in the country. He combined for a total of 26 points, which was second in the ACC and fifth in the nation. Petković's performance helped the Pittsburgh Panthers earn their first ever trip to the College Cup (NCAA National Semifinals) before they lost to national finalists, Indiana. Concluding the 2020 season, Petković was named the National Player of the Year by Top Drawer Soccer.

While it was speculated that Petkovic would go pro and declare for the 2021 MLS SuperDraft, he returned to Pitt for his junior year. Ahead of the 2021 NCAA Division I men's soccer season, he was named to the MAC Herman Trophy watchlist.

Petkovic left the University of Pittsburgh during the 2021 season after leaving a match on October 1, 2021, with an injury.

== Personal life ==
Petković has two brothers, Bratislav and Ognjen Petković. His brother, Bratislav, plays collegiate soccer for Lehigh University.
