= Dr. Mark & Cindy Lynn Stadium =

Soccer stadium at the University of Louisville

- Lynn Stadium
- Interactive map of Dr. Mark & Cindy Lynn Stadium
- Full name: Dr. Mark & Cindy Lynn Stadium
- Location: Louisville, Kentucky
- Coordinates: 38.2087°N 85.75515°W
- Owner: University of Louisville
- Operator: University of Louisville Athletic Department
- Capacity: 5,300 (soccer)
- Executive suites: 3 (Founders, athletic department and press box)
- Surface: Natural turf
- Field size: 109.73 x 68.58 m (120 x 75 yards)

Construction
- Groundbreaking: May 3, 2013
- Opened: August 1, 2014
- Cost: $18.5 million
- Architect: TEG Louisville
- Project manager: TEG Louisville
- General contractors: Abel Construction Co, Inc

Tenants
- Louisville Cardinals teams: Men's soccer; women's soccer; Professional teams: Louisville City FC

Website
- gocards.com/lynn-stadium

Dr. Mark & Cindy Lynn Stadium is a soccer-specific stadium in Louisville, Kentucky. The stadium was built for the University of Louisville Cardinals men's and women's soccer teams. The teams compete in the Atlantic Coast Conference.

== Design ==
The stadium, modeled after Sporting KC's Children's Mercy Park, was designed by TEG Architects, LLC of Louisville. The stadium includes chairback seating for 2,400 in the main grandstand, bleacher seating for 950 in the east end zone, and two berms, which can accommodate 2,400. Lynn Stadium also features a 15,320 square foot training center, which includes identical locker rooms for each team (Men's and Women's), coaches' offices and a sports medicine training room. The complex received LEED Silver certification from the United States Green Building Council (USGBC). The university named the venue after Dr. Mark and Cindy Lynn for their $5 million donation towards its construction.

== Matches ==
The stadium has also hosted professional matches for Louisville City FC, which plays in the USL Championship and was unable to use its former venue, Louisville Slugger Field, in some instances. On November 17, 2019, the stadium hosted the USL Championship Final between Louisville City FC and Real Monarchs. Additional seating was installed to bring the capacity up to 7,025, as Louisville City lost 3–1 to the Monarchs.

== See also ==
- List of attractions and events in the Louisville metropolitan area
