= 2019 NCAA Division I men's soccer season =

American college soccer season

- Duration: August 29 – December 15, 2019
- Number of teams: 206
- Hermann Trophy: Robbie Robinson (Clemson)
- Top goalscorer: 18 Goals; Thibaut Jacquel (Campbell); Cal Jennings (UCF); Robbie Robinson (Clemson)

Statistics
- Biggest home win: Northern Kentucky 11–0 Berea (10/09); Syracuse 11–0 Morrisville State (10/22)
- Biggest away win: NJIT 7–0 Sacred Heart (08/30)
- Highest scoring: Northern Kentucky 11–0 Berea (10/09); Syracuse 11–0 Morrisville State (10/22)
- Longest winning run: Season; 17 games Missouri State (09/02–11/17); Ongoing; 8 games Merrimack (10/04–current)
- Longest unbeaten run: Season; 21 games Missouri State (19–0–2) (11/07/2018–11/24/2019); Ongoing; 16 games Seattle (13-0-3)
- Longest winless run: 23 games Harvard (0–22–1) (10/02/2018-current)
- Longest losing run: 13 games Evansville (09/18–current)
- Highest attendance: 11,075; UC Santa Barbara @ Cal Poly (11/02)

Tournament
- Duration: November 24–December 15, 2019

College Cup
- Date: December 15, 2019
- Site: WakeMed Soccer Park; Cary, North Carolina
- Champions: Georgetown
- Runners-up: Virginia

Seasons
- ← 2018 2020 →

The 2019 NCAA Division I men's soccer season was the 61st season of NCAA championship men's college soccer. The regular season began on August 30, 2019 and continued into the third weekend of November 2019. The season culminated with the four-team College Cup at WakeMed Soccer Park in Cary, North Carolina, December 13–15, 2019. A total of 206 men's soccer teams played in Division I during this season. The Georgetown Hoyas won their first NCAA title, defeating the Virginia Cavaliers 7–6 on penalty kicks following a 3–3 draw after.two extra time periods.

== Changes from 2018 ==
=== Coaching changes ===
Program	Outgoing coach	Manner of departure	Date of vacancy	Incoming coach	Date of appointment
American	Todd West	Resigned	November 25, 2018	Zach Samol	December 21, 2018
Belmont	Bryan Green	Resigned	November 6, 2018	David Costa	December 27, 2018
Cleveland State	Kirk Harwat	Resigned	March 5, 2019	Siniša Ubiparipović	May 24, 2019
Creighton	Elmar Bolowich	Hired by Jacksonville Armada FC	November 12, 2018	Johnny Torres	November 12, 2018
Davidson	Matt Spear	Hired by Richmond Kickers	December 6, 2018	Mike Babst	January 17, 2019
Fordham	Jim McElderry	Hired by Rutgers	December 9, 2018	Carlo Acquista	January 30, 2019
High Point	EJ O’Keeffe	Hired by UNC Greensboro	January 15, 2019	Zach Haines	February 12, 2019
Liberty	Jeff Alder	Resigned	November 29, 2018	Kelly Findley	December 20, 2018
LIU (replaces LIU Brooklyn)	TJ Kostecky	Not retained To Bard College	Not announced	Michael Mordocco	February 6, 2018 (as head coach, LIU Post)
Louisville	Ken Lolla	Resigned	December 11, 2018	John Michael Hayden	December 27, 2018
Pacific	Ryan Jorden	To UCLA	April 29, 2019	Adam Reeves	June 20, 2019
Rutgers	Dan Donigan	Fired	November 6, 2018	Jim McElderry	December 9, 2018
San Francisco	Eddie Soto	Resigned	March 7, 2019	Leonard Griffin	April 11, 2019
SIU Edwardsville	Mario Sanchez	Hired by Louisville City FC	November 30, 2018	Cale Wassermann	January 17, 2019
VMI	Michael Bonelli	Resigned	February 28, 2019	Charlie Hubbard	March 26, 2019
UAB	Mike Getman	Not announced	November 26, 2018	Jeff Kinney	December 21, 2018
UCLA	Jorge Salcedo	Resigned	March 21, 2019	Ryan Jorden	April 29, 2019
UNC Greensboro	Justin Maullin	Contract not renewed	November 15, 2018	EJ O’Keeffe	January 15, 2019
Wofford	Ralph Polson	Retired	November 12, 2018	Joel Tyson	December 12, 2018

=== New programs ===
The Merrimack Warriors began the transition from Division II to Division I, joining the Northeast Conference.

Long Island University announced in October 2018 that its two current athletic programs—the Division I LIU Brooklyn Blackbirds and the Division II LIU Post Pioneers—would merge into a single Division I athletic program under the LIU name after the 2018–19 school year. The unified program, which maintains LIU Brooklyn's Division I and Northeast Conference memberships, announced its new nickname of Sharks on May 15, 2019. With both campuses having sponsored men's soccer, the two teams became a single LIU team based at the Post campus in Nassau County, New York in the 2019 season.

==== Rebranded programs ====
In addition to LIU, one other Division I men's soccer program assumed a new athletic identity during the 2018–19 offseason. On July 1, 2019, the University of Missouri–Kansas City (UMKC) announced that its athletic program, previously known as the UMKC Kangaroos, would henceforth be known as the Kansas City Roos.

==== Upcoming programs ====
Three schools that sponsor men's soccer began transitions from Division II in the 2020–21 school year. Bellarmine will join the ASUN Conference, Dixie State will join the Western Athletic Conference, and UC San Diego will join the Big West Conference.

=== Discontinued programs ===
Despite the program's many successes, the University of New Mexico's Board of Regents voted, for economic reasons, to discontinue the men's soccer program and three other sports teams at the conclusion of their 2018–19 seasons.

=== Conference realignment ===
School	Previous Conference	New Conference
Central Arkansas	Missouri Valley Conference affiliate	Sun Belt Conference affiliate
Merrimack	Northeast-10 Conference (NCAA Division II)	Northeast Conference

This was also the final season for four schools in their then-current conferences. The Cal State Bakersfield Roadrunners and Kansas City Roos both left their then-current home of the Western Athletic Conference, with the Roadrunners joining the Big West Conference and the Roos returning to the Summit League in July 2020. The Purdue Fort Wayne Mastodons left the Summit League for the Horizon League. The UConn Huskies left the American Athletic Conference to join several of their former conference mates in the Big East Conference.

== Season outlook ==
=== Preseason polls ===
United Soccer Coaches
Rank	Team
1	Maryland
2	Indiana
3	Akron
4	Wake Forest
5	Stanford
6	North Carolina
7	Michigan State
8	Kentucky
9	Notre Dame
10	Duke
11	Saint Mary's
12	Virginia
13	Georgetown
14	Louisville
15	UCF
16	Virginia Tech
17	James Madison
18	Denver
19	Air Force
20	Portland
21	Charlotte
22	Oregon State
23	West Virginia
24	Michigan
25	UC Irvine

College Soccer News
Rank	Team
1	Wake Forest
2	Kentucky
3	Akron
4	Maryland
5	Stanford
6	Saint Mary's
7	North Carolina
8	Duke
9	Indiana
10	Michigan State
11	James Madison
12	Georgetown
13	Virginia
14	Notre Dame
15	Louisville
16	Michigan
17	Denver
18	UCF
19	Virginia Tech
20	West Virginia
21	Oregon State
22	SMU
23	Charlotte
24	Portland
25	NC State
26	UConn
27	UC Irvine
28	Washington
29	Colgate
30	New Hampshire

Top Drawer Soccer
Rank	Team
1	Maryland
2	Akron
3	Wake Forest
4	Stanford
5	Indiana
6	Kentucky
7	North Carolina
8	Michigan State
9	Louisville
10	Duke
11	Georgetown
12	Denver
13	Michigan
14	Saint Mary's
15	Virginia
16	Notre Dame
17	UCF
18	Portland
19	Virginia Tech
20	Charlotte
21	UC Irvine
22	NC State
23	Air Force
24	James Madison
25	West Virginia

Soccer America
Rank	Team
1	North Carolina
2	Akron
3	Saint Mary's
4	Stanford
5	Wake Forest
6	Kentucky
7	Maryland
8	Duke
9	Virginia
10	Indiana
11	Georgetown
12	James Madison
13	UCF
14	Virginia Tech
15	Michigan State
16	Louisville
17	Michigan
18	Washington
19	Denver
20	Charlotte
21	Oregon State
22	Portland
23	UC Irvine
24	Lipscomb
25	NC State

== Regular season ==
=== #1 ===
Weekly United Soccer Coaches #1 ranked team
Date	Team	Date	Team	Date	Team	Date	Team
August 6 (preseason)	**Maryland**	None until after season starts		September 3	**Wake Forest**	September 10	**Wake Forest**
September 17	**Wake Forest**	September 24	**Stanford**	October 1	**Virginia**	October 8	**Virginia**
October 15	**Virginia**	October 22	**Washington**	October 29	**Washington**	November 5	**Washington**
November 12	**Clemson**	November 19	**Virginia**	None until after tournament		December 17	**Georgetown**

=== Standings ===
2019 America East Conference men's soccer standings
	Conf.					Overall
Team	W		L		T	W		L		T
No. 22 New Hampshire ‡	5	–	1	–	1	15	–	2	–	3
Vermont	5	–	1	–	1	11	–	6	–	1
Hartford	4	–	2	–	1	12	–	5	–	4
Albany	4	–	3	–	0	9	–	7	–	1
UMass Lowell	3	–	4	–	0	9	–	8	–	1
Binghamton	3	–	4	–	0	6	–	9	–	3
UMBC	1	–	5	–	1	6	–	9	–	1
Stony Brook	1	–	6	–	0	4	–	11	–	1
‡ – 2019 Am. East Tournament champion + – Invited to the 2019 NCAA Tournament; As of 17 December 2019; Rankings from United Soccer Coaches

2019 American Athletic Conference men's soccer standings
	Conf.					Overall
Team	W		L		T	W		L		T
No. 10 UCF +	6	–	0	–	1	15	–	3	–	2
No. 7 SMU ‡	5	–	1	–	1	18	–	2	–	1
South Florida +	4	–	3	–	0	10	–	7	–	1
Memphis	4	–	3	–	0	10	–	7	–	0
Temple	3	–	2	–	2	8	–	8	–	2
UConn	2	–	5	–	0	5	–	12	–	1
Cincinnati	1	–	5	–	1	5	–	11	–	1
Tulsa	0	–	6	–	1	4	–	9	–	2
‡ – 2019 American Tournament champion + – Invited to the 2019 NCAA tournament; As of 17 December 2019; Rankings from United Soccer Coaches

2019 Atlantic 10 Conference men's soccer standings
	Conf.					Overall
Team	W		L		T	W		L		T
Rhode Island ‡	7	–	1	–	0	14	–	4	–	3
VCU	6	–	1	–	1	7	–	8	–	3
Dayton	6	–	2	–	0	13	–	8	–	0
Saint Louis	6	–	2	–	0	10	–	7	–	0
Fordham	5	–	2	–	1	7	–	10	–	3
La Salle	4	–	4	–	0	8	–	9	–	1
Duquesne	3	–	5	–	0	8	–	8	–	1
UMass	3	–	5	–	0	7	–	10	–	0
George Washington	3	–	5	–	0	5	–	11	–	1
George Mason	3	–	5	–	0	4	–	12	–	2
Davidson	3	–	5	–	0	3	–	11	–	2
Saint Joseph's	1	–	7	–	0	5	–	12	–	1
St. Bonaventure	1	–	7	–	0	5	–	11	–	0
‡ – 2019 Atlantic 10 Tournament champion + – Invited to the 2019 NCAA tournament; As of 22 November 2019; Rankings from United Soccer Coaches

2019 ACC men's soccer standings
	Conf.					Overall
Team	W		L		T	W		L		T
Atlantic
No. 5 Clemson +	6	–	1	–	1	18	–	2	–	2
No. 3 Wake Forest +	6	–	2	–	0	16	–	5	–	2
NC State +	3	–	4	–	1	9	–	7	–	3
No. 20 Louisville +	3	–	4	–	1	10	–	8	–	2
Boston College +	2	–	4	–	2	9	–	6	–	3
Syracuse +	2	–	4	–	2	8	–	7	–	4
Coastal
No. 2 Virginia ‡	6	–	1	–	1	21	–	1	–	2
Pittsburgh +	4	–	3	–	1	10	–	8	–	2
Notre Dame +	3	–	5	–	0	10	–	8	–	1
North Carolina	3	–	5	–	0	7	–	8	–	3
No. 13 Virginia Tech +	2	–	4	–	2	10	–	6	–	3
Duke	2	–	5	–	1	7	–	9	–	2
‡ – 2019 ACC Tournament champion + – Invited to the 2019 NCAA tournament; As of 17 December 2019; Rankings from United Soccer Coaches; Source:The ACC

2019 Atlantic Sun Conference men's soccer standings
	Conf.					Overall
Team	W		L		T	W		L		T
NJIT ‡	5	–	1	–	0	10	–	5	–	4
Florida Gulf Coast	4	–	1	–	1	9	–	8	–	2
Stetson	3	–	2	–	1	8	–	10	–	2
North Florida	3	–	2	–	1	6	–	8	–	2
Lipscomb	3	–	3	–	0	5	–	9	–	2
Liberty	1	–	5	–	0	5	–	13	–	0
Jacksonville	0	–	5	–	1	5	–	7	–	2
‡ – 2019 ASUN Tournament champion + – Invited to the 2019 NCAA tournament; As of 22 November 2019; Rankings from United Soccer Coaches

2019 Big East Conference men's soccer standings
	Conf.					Overall
Team	W		L		T	W		L		T
No. 1 Georgetown ‡	7	–	0	–	2	18	–	1	–	4
No. 12 St. John's +	6	–	2	–	1	15	–	5	–	1
No. 14 Providence +	6	–	3	–	0	16	–	7	–	0
Creighton	4	–	4	–	1	8	–	7	–	2
Butler +	4	–	4	–	1	11	–	7	–	2
Marquette	4	–	5	–	0	8	–	9	–	1
Seton Hall	3	–	5	–	1	6	–	9	–	1
Xavier	3	–	6	–	0	8	–	8	–	1
Villanova	2	–	6	–	1	9	–	8	–	1
DePaul	1	–	5	–	3	5	–	9	–	3
‡ – 2019 Big East Tournament champion + – Invited to the 2019 NCAA tournament; As of 17 December 2019; Rankings from United Soccer Coaches

2019 Big South Conference men's soccer standings
	Conf.					Overall
Team	W		L		T	W		L		T
No. 24 Campbell ‡	8	–	0	–	0	17	–	3	–	2
High Point	7	–	1	–	0	13	–	7	–	0
Gardner–Webb	5	–	2	–	1	9	–	8	–	2
Winthrop	3	–	3	–	2	5	–	10	–	3
Presbyterian	3	–	4	–	1	6	–	13	–	1
Radford	3	–	5	–	0	5	–	11	–	2
UNC Asheville	3	–	5	–	0	4	–	12	–	1
Longwood	1	–	7	–	0	6	–	10	–	0
USC Upstate	1	–	7	–	0	5	–	12	–	0
‡ – 2019 Big South Tournament champion + – Invited to the 2019 NCAA Tournament; As of 17 December 2019; Rankings from United Soccer Coaches

2019 Big Ten Conference men's soccer standings
	Conf.					Overall
Team	W		L		T	W		L		T
No. 9 Indiana ‡	7	–	1	–	0	15	–	3	–	4
No. 18 Penn State +	6	–	1	–	1	12	–	4	–	3
No. 17 Michigan +	4	–	1	–	3	11	–	5	–	6
Maryland +	3	–	3	–	2	11	–	8	–	2
Northwestern	3	–	3	–	2	8	–	8	–	2
Michigan State	3	–	4	–	1	3	–	12	–	3
Wisconsin	1	–	4	–	3	3	–	11	–	4
Rutgers	1	–	6	–	1	7	–	8	–	3
Ohio State	1	–	6	–	1	7	–	11	–	1
‡ – 2019 B1G Tournament champion + – Invited to the 2019 NCAA tournament; As of 17 December 2019; Rankings from United Soccer Coaches; Source: Big Ten

2019 Big West Conference men's soccer standings
	Conf.					Overall
Team	W		L		T	W		L		T
No. 25 UC Davis ‡	5	–	1	–	1	12	–	5	–	2
No. 8 UC Santa Barbara+	4	–	1	–	2	15	–	4	–	4
UC Irvine	4	–	2	–	1	7	–	7	–	5
Cal State Fullerton	3	–	4	–	0	12	–	7	–	1
Cal Poly	3	–	4	–	0	7	–	9	–	1
Cal State Northridge	2	–	3	–	2	8	–	9	–	3
Sacramento State	2	–	4	–	1	7	–	9	–	2
UC Riverside	1	–	5	–	1	6	–	9	–	3
‡ – 2019 Big West Tournament champion + – Invited to the 2019 NCAA tournament; As of 17 December 2019; Rankings from United Soccer Coaches

2019 Colonial Athletic Association men's soccer standings
	Conf.					Overall
Team	W		L		T	W		L		T
UNCW	7	–	0	–	1	12	–	5	–	2
James Madison ‡	5	–	2	–	1	12	–	7	–	2
Hofstra	5	–	2	–	1	10	–	7	–	2
William & Mary	4	–	2	–	2	7	–	9	–	2
Northeastern	3	–	3	–	2	6	–	9	–	3
Delaware	2	–	4	–	2	3	–	9	–	3
Elon	2	–	6	–	0	7	–	9	–	1
Drexel	1	–	5	–	1	6	–	9	–	2
Charleston	1	–	7	–	1	2	–	12	–	1
‡ – 2019 CAA Tournament champion + – Invited to the 2019 NCAA tournament; As of 32 November 2019; Rankings from United Soccer Coaches

2019 Conference USA men's soccer standings
	Conf.					Overall
Team	W		L		T	W		L		T
No. 11 Marshall ‡	5	–	1	–	1	16	–	3	–	3
No. 21 Charlotte +	4	–	0	–	3	12	–	4	–	4
No. 23 Kentucky +	4	–	2	–	1	13	–	5	–	3
FIU	4	–	2	–	1	10	–	3	–	5
Florida Atlantic	3	–	4	–	0	7	–	8	–	1
South Carolina	2	–	5	–	0	7	–	9	–	2
UAB	1	–	5	–	1	3	–	12	–	2
Old Dominion	1	–	5	–	1	3	–	11	–	1
‡ – 2019 CUSA Tournament champion + – Invited to the 2019 NCAA tournament; As of 17 December 2019; Rankings from United Soccer Coaches

2019 Horizon League men's soccer standings
	Conf.					Overall
Team	W		L		T	W		L		T
UIC	6	–	2	–	0	12	–	5	–	1
Oakland	4	–	2	–	2	7	–	9	–	3
Detroit Mercy	4	–	3	–	1	7	–	11	–	1
Green Bay	4	–	4	–	0	6	–	8	–	2
Wright State ‡	4	–	4	–	0	11	–	8	–	4
Milwaukee	3	–	3	–	2	10	–	6	–	4
Cleveland State	3	–	5	–	0	7	–	7	–	1
Northern Kentucky	3	–	5	–	0	7	–	10	–	1
IUPUI	2	–	5	–	1	4	–	10	–	3
‡ – 2019 Horizon Tournament champion + – Invited to the 2019 NCAA tournament; As of 25 November 2019; Rankings from United Soccer Coaches

2019 Ivy League men's soccer standings
	Conf.					Overall
Team	W		L		T	W		L		T
Yale †	6	–	1	–	0	13	–	3	–	2
Penn	4	–	1	–	2	8	–	5	–	3
Cornell	3	–	2	–	2	10	–	5	–	2
Dartmouth	3	–	3	–	1	6	–	7	–	2
Princeton	2	–	2	–	3	10	–	5	–	3
Columbia	2	–	3	–	2	5	–	8	–	4
Brown	2	–	3	–	2	4	–	10	–	3
Harvard	0	–	7	–	0	0	–	14	–	1
† – Conference champion + – Invited to the 2019 NCAA Tournament; As of 17 December 2019; Rankings from United Soccer Coaches

2019 Metro Atlantic Athletic Conference men's soccer standings
	Conf.					Overall
Team	W		L		T	W		L		T
Saint Peter's	9	–	1	–	0	13	–	6	–	0
Quinnipiac	7	–	2	–	1	9	–	6	–	3
Iona ‡	6	–	3	–	1	14	–	6	–	1
Marist	6	–	4	–	0	10	–	9	–	0
Manhattan	5	–	4	–	1	6	–	10	–	1
Rider	4	–	4	–	2	7	–	8	–	2
Niagara	4	–	5	–	1	6	–	11	–	1
Fairfield	3	–	4	–	2	5	–	7	–	4
Monmouth	3	–	7	–	1	3	–	13	–	2
Siena	2	–	7	–	1	5	–	12	–	1
Canisius	1	–	9	–	0	3	–	15	–	0
‡ – 2019 MAAC Tournament champion + – Invited to the 2019 NCAA tournament; As of 22 November 2019; Rankings from United Soccer Coaches

2019 Mid-American Conference men's soccer standings
	Conf.					Overall
Team	W		L		T	W		L		T
Akron	4	–	0	–	1	6	–	10	–	2
Western Michigan	2	–	1	–	2	11	–	6	–	2
SIUE	2	–	1	–	2	8	–	5	–	4
Northern Illinois	2	–	3	–	0	7	–	10	–	1
Bowling Green	2	–	3	–	0	13	–	7	–	1
West Virginia ‡	0	–	4	–	1	10	–	9	–	2
‡ – 2019 MAC Tournament champion + – Invited to the 2019 NCAA tournament; As of 25 November 2019; Rankings from United Soccer Coaches; Source: MAC

2019 Missouri Valley Conference men's soccer standings
	Conf.					Overall
Team	W		L		T	W		L		T
No. 16 Missouri State +	10	–	0	–	0	18	–	1	–	1
Loyola Chicago ‡	5	–	2	–	3	11	–	4	–	4
Bradley	5	–	2	–	2	8	–	6	–	4
Drake	4	–	5	–	1	8	–	9	–	1
Valparaiso	3	–	7	–	0	4	–	13	–	1
Evansville	0	–	10	–	0	2	–	15	–	1
‡ – 2019 MVC Tournament champion + – Invited to the 2019 NCAA tournament; As of 17 December 2019; Rankings from United Soccer Coaches

2019 Northeast Conference men's soccer standings
	Conf.					Overall
Team	W		L		T	W		L		T
Merrimack ^{#}	9	–	0	–	0	11	–	3	–	2
Saint Francis (PA)	7	–	2	–	0	10	–	6	–	0
LIU	6	–	2	–	1	10	–	7	–	2
Bryant	5	–	4	–	0	8	–	8	–	0
Fairleigh Dickinson ‡	3	–	4	–	2	8	–	9	–	3
St. Francis Brooklyn	3	–	5	–	1	7	–	6	–	2
Robert Morris	3	–	5	–	1	4	–	11	–	2
Mount St. Mary's	3	–	6	–	0	7	–	10	–	0
Sacred Heart	1	–	5	–	3	2	–	11	–	3
Central Connecticut	1	–	8	–	0	1	–	13	–	1
‡ – 2019 NEC Tournament champion + – Invited to the 2019 NCAA tournament ^{#} – Ineligible for post-season (In transition); As of 22 November 2019; Rankings from United Soccer Coaches

2019 Pac-12 Conference men's soccer standings
	Conf.					Overall
Team	W		L		T	W		L		T
No. 6 Washington †	9	–	2	–	0	16	–	4	–	0
No. 4 Stanford +	6	–	2	–	2	14	–	3	–	5
Oregon State	5	–	3	–	2	8	–	5	–	2
California +	4	–	4	–	2	8	–	7	–	3
UCLA	2	–	6	–	1	6	–	9	–	2
San Diego State	1	–	9	–	0	4	–	12	–	2
† – Conference champion + – Invited to the 2019 NCAA Tournament; As of 17 December 2019; Rankings from United Soccer Coaches

2019 Patriot League men's soccer standings
	Conf.					Overall
Team	W		L		T	W		L		T
Lehigh ‡	6	–	0	–	3	13	–	5	–	3
Loyola (MD)	7	–	2	–	0	10	–	8	–	1
Navy	5	–	3	–	1	11	–	4	–	1
Lafayette	4	–	3	–	2	10	–	7	–	3
Colgate	4	–	4	–	1	6	–	9	–	4
Bucknell	2	–	2	–	5	6	–	7	–	7
American	3	–	5	–	1	3	–	11	–	2
Boston U	3	–	6	–	0	4	–	12	–	1
Army	2	–	4	–	3	5	–	7	–	4
Holy Cross	1	–	8	–	0	3	–	15	–	0
‡ – 2019 Patriot Tournament Champion + – Invited to the 2019 NCAA tournament; As of 22 November 2019; Rankings from United Soccer Coaches

2019 Southern Conference men's soccer standings
	Conf.					Overall
Team	W		L		T	W		L		T
UNCG	5	–	1	–	0	8	–	9	–	1
Furman	5	–	1	–	0	11	–	7	–	1
ETSU	4	–	2	–	0	8	–	8	–	2
Mercer ‡	3	–	3	–	0	14	–	7	–	0
Wofford	2	–	3	–	1	4	–	13	–	1
Belmont	1	–	4	–	1	5	–	12	–	2
VMI	0	–	6	–	0	1	–	16	–	0
‡ – 2019 SoCon Tournament Champion + – Invited to the 2019 NCAA tournament; As of 22 November 2019; Rankings from United Soccer Coaches

2019 Summit League men's soccer standings
	Conf.					Overall
Team	W		L		T	W		L		T
Western Illinois	4	–	1	–	0	5	–	13	–	1
Oral Roberts	4	–	1	–	0	13	–	4	–	0
Denver ‡	2	–	2	–	1	6	–	12	–	3
Omaha	2	–	2	–	1	4	–	9	–	4
Eastern Illinois	1	–	2	–	2	5	–	9	–	2
Purdue Fort Wayne	0	–	5	–	0	3	–	15	–	0
‡ – Summit Tournament Champion + – Invited to the 2019 NCAA tournament; As of 22 November 2019; Rankings from United Soccer Coaches

2019 Sun Belt Conference men's soccer standings
	Conf.					Overall
Team	W		L		T	W		L		T
Central Arkansas	4	–	1	–	0	10	–	7	–	1
Coastal Carolina ‡	3	–	2	–	0	10	–	8	–	3
Appalachian State	2	–	3	–	0	11	–	7	–	1
Georgia State	2	–	3	–	0	12	–	4	–	4
Georgia Southern	2	–	3	–	0	7	–	9	–	2
Howard	2	–	3	–	0	5	–	12	–	1
‡ – Sun Belt Tournament Champion + – Invited to the 2019 NCAA tournament; As of 29 November 2019; Rankings from United Soccer Coaches

2019 West Coast Conference men's soccer standings
	Conf.					Overall
Team	W		L		T	W		L		T
No. 15 Saint Mary's †	7	–	0	–	0	16	–	2	–	0
Loyola Marymount +	6	–	1	–	0	11	–	6	–	3
Gonzaga	3	–	3	–	1	4	–	10	–	3
San Diego	3	–	4	–	0	12	–	5	–	1
Portland	3	–	4	–	0	9	–	7	–	1
Santa Clara	2	–	4	–	1	8	–	7	–	2
Pacific	2	–	4	–	0	5	–	10	–	1
San Francisco	0	–	6	–	0	2	–	13	–	1
† – Conference champion + – Invited to the 2019 NCAA tournament; As of 17 December 2019; Rankings from United Soccer Coaches

2019 Western Athletic Conference men's soccer standings
	Conf.					Overall
Team	W		L		T	W		L		T
No. 19 Seattle ‡	10	–	0	–	1	15	–	3	–	5
Utah Valley	8	–	3	–	0	13	–	6	–	2
Air Force	6	–	5	–	0	8	–	11	–	0
CSU Bakersfield	6	–	5	–	0	8	–	11	–	0
San Jose State	5	–	4	–	2	5	–	12	–	2
Cal Baptist ^{#}	5	–	5	–	1	6	–	11	–	2
Houston Baptist	5	–	6	–	0	7	–	11	–	0
Kansas City	5	–	6	–	0	6	–	11	–	0
UTRGV	4	–	5	–	2	8	–	6	–	2
UNLV	4	–	6	–	1	6	–	12	–	1
Incarnate Word	2	–	9	–	0	5	–	12	–	0
Grand Canyon	1	–	7	–	3	4	–	9	–	4
‡ – WAC Tournament Champion + – Invited to the 2019 NCAA tournament ^{#} – Ineligible for post-season (In transition); As of 17 December, 2019; Rankings from United Soccer Coaches

=== Major upsets ===
In this list, a "major upset" is defined as a game won by a team ranked 10 or more spots lower or an unranked team that defeats a team ranked #15 or higher.

All rankings are from the United Soccer Coaches Poll.

Date	Winner	Score	Loser
August 30	@ **Xavier**	2–0	#3 Akron
September 3	@ **Louisville**	3–0	#9 Kentucky
September 6	@ **UCLA**	3–2	#3 Maryland
September 12	@ **Cal State Northridge**	3–1	#8 Washington
September 13	@ **UC Riverside**	2–0	#14 Florida Gulf Coast
September 13	@ **West Virginia**	5–2	#15 Coastal Carolina
September 14	**Memphis**	3–2 ^{2OT}	@ #11 Xavier
September 17	@ **James Madison**	1–0	#1 Wake Forest
September 23	@ #25 **Maryland**	1–0 ^{2OT}	#9 St. John's
September 24	@ **Butler**	2–1	#5 Indiana
September 24	@ #17 **Louisville**	1–0 ^{2OT}	#2 Georgetown
September 26	**UC Davis**	4–2	@ #6 Saint Mary's
September 27	**Duke**	3–2	@ #14 North Carolina
October 4	@ **Boston College**	2–1	#3 Wake Forest
October 5	@ **Maryland**	2–0	#14 Cal State Fullerton
October 15	**Georgia State**	1–0	@ #10 Charlotte
October 18	@ #25 **Maryland**	3–0	#6 Indiana
October 18	**Pittsburgh**	2–0	@ #1 Virginia
October 18	**Memphis**	4–3 ^{OT}	@ #3 SMU
October 26	**Notre Dame**	1–0	@ #2 Wake Forest
October 26	@ **Florida Atlantic**	1–0 ^{OT}	#15 Marshall
November 1	@ **South Carolina**	1–0	#13 FIU
November 1	@ **Albany**	1–0	#14 New Hampshire
November 6	@ **Providence**	2–0	#8 St. John's
November 7	**California**	3–2	@ #1 Washington
November 14	**California**	1–0	@ #4 Stanford
November 15	**Michigan**	1–0	#12 Penn State
November 15	**Providence**	2–1	@ #14 St. John's
November 24	#22 **UC Santa Barbara**	4–0	@ #10 Saint Mary's
December 1	#22 **UC Santa Barbara**	1–0 ^{2OT}	@ #6 Indiana

=== Early season tournaments ===
Several universities hosted early season soccer tournaments.

Name	Date(s)	Stadium	City	No. teams	Champion
Bryant & Sons Cup (preseason)	Aug. 17	Harder Stadium	Santa Barbara, CA	2	UC Santa Barbara
Aaron Olitsky Memorial Classic	Aug. 30–Sep. 1	Patriots Point Soccer Field	Charleston, SC	4	Georgia Southern
Adidas/IU Credit Union Classic	Aug. 30–Sep. 1	Bill Armstrong Stadium	Bloomington, IN	4	Indiana
Carolina Nike Classic	Aug. 30–Sep. 1	UNC Lacrosse & Soccer Stadium	Chapel Hill, NC	4	Wake Forest
Hampton Inn at Loyola Chicago Classic	Aug. 30–Sep. 1	Loyola Soccer Park	Chicago, IL	4	Loyola Chicago
John Rennie Invitational	Aug. 30–Sep. 1	Koskinen Stadium	Durham, NC	4	Duke
Portland Tournament	Aug. 30–Sep. 1	Merlo Field	Portland, OR	4	Coastal Carolina
Wolstein Classic	Aug. 30–Sep. 1	Jesse Owens Memorial Stadium	Columbus, OH	4	Cal State Northridge
Mike Gibbs Memorial Tournament	Aug. 30–Sep. 2	Hodges Stadium	Jacksonville, FL	4	North Florida
VCU Tournament	Aug. 31–Sep. 2	Sports Backers Stadium	Richmond, VA	4	LIU
Aztec Soccer Classic	Sep. 6–8	SDSU Sports Deck	San Diego, CA	4	Detroit Mercy
Chicago Classic	Sep. 6–8	Lanny and Sharon Martin Stadium	Evanston, IL	4	Bowling Green
Copa de Causeway	Sep. 6–8	Aggie Soccer Field	Davis, CA	4	UC Davis
Dayton Classic	Sep. 6–8	Baujan Field	Dayton, OH	4	Ohio State
Fairfield Inn/JMU Invitational	Sep. 6–8	Sentara Park	Harrisonburg, VA	4	Virginia Tech
Mike Berticelli Memorial Tournament	Sep. 6–8	Alumni Stadium	Notre Dame, IN	4	Notre Dame
Soccer For a Cure Classic	Sep. 6–8	Mike Rose Soccer Complex	Memphis, TN	4	Mercer
Stihl Classic	Sep. 6–8	ODU Soccer Complex	Norfolk, VA	4	NJIT

=== Top Drawer Soccer Team of the Week ===
- **Bold** denotes TDS player of the week.

Team of the week
Week	Goalkeeper	Defenders	Midfielders	Forwards
Sep. 3	(United States) Rosenberg (Xavier)	(United States) Hansen (St. John's) (United States) Hogan (Charlotte) (Germany) Cukaj (Marquette) (United States) Benalcazar (Wake Forest) (Iceland) Ingason (Virginia Tech)	(United States) McGlynn (Siena) (France) Medilah (FGCU) (Brazil) Arcangeli (UCF)	(Norway) Engebretsen (Saint Mary's) (United States) **Trejo** (CSUN)
Sep. 10	(Senegal) Mwembia (Bowling Green)	(United States) Munjoma (SMU) (United States) French (Washington) (Norway) Ueland (Virginia)	(Germany) Hendel (Portland) (Italy) Proch (Duke) (France) Chaouche (Charlotte)	(Mexico) Del Mundo (California) (Israel) Hazut (UIC) (North Macedonia) **M. Iloski** (UCLA) (United States) Lynn (Notre Dame)
Sep. 17	(Jamaica) Waite (Fairleigh Dickinson)	(Jamaica) Brown (South Florida) (United States) Terwege (SMU) (Canada) Higgins (Syracuse) (United States) Mason (Loyola (MD))	(Algeria) Riviere (Georgetown) (United States) McCartney (Dartmouth) (United States) Matteo (Yale)	(United States) **Pinzon** (Cal State Fullerton) (England) Dolling (Missouri State) (Norway) Engebretsen (Saint Mary's)
Sep. 24	(United States) Ammann (Pittsburgh)	(United States) Pierre (Portland) (United States) Wilkinson (Saint Louis)	(United States) Cervantes (LMU) (United States) Petridis (St. John's) (Spain) **Ferriol** (James Madison) (United States) Moderwell (Northwestern) (England) Wilkin (Missouri State)	(United States) Jennings (UCF) (United States) McLaughlin (SMU) (United States) Meek (Washington)
Oct. 1	(United States) Bramblett (Navy)	(United States) Bartlow (Washington) (United States) St. Martin (Maryland) (United States) Torr (CSUF)	(United States) **Elmedkhar** (Kentucky) (Brazil) Costa (SMU) (United States) Brito (Charlotte) (United States) Williamson (Duke)	(United States) Colacci (New Hampshire) (Sierra Leone) Michael (UCSB) (United States) Luchini (Lehigh)
Oct. 8	(Netherlands) Swaneveld (Virginia Tech)	(England) Roberts (Memphis) (United States) Bustamante (St. John's) (United States) Kessler (Virginia)	(United States) Bowie (Western Michigan) (France) Perez (UCF) (Brazil) Costa (SMU) (United States) Morris (Indiana)	(North Macedonia) **M. Iloski** (UCLA) (United States) Bodily (Washington) (United States) Becher (Saint Louis)
Oct. 15	(United States) Schulte (Saint Louis)	(United States) Maher (Indiana) (New Zealand) Billingsley (UCSB)	(United States) Sharp (Western Michigan) (Brazil) Lapa (Wake Forest) (United States) Conde (FIU) (Canada) **Raposo** (Syracuse)	(United States) Butts (Penn State) (United States) Estrada (California) (France) Jacquel (Campbell) (United States) Robinson (Clemson)
Oct. 22	(United States) Pannenberg (Wake Forest)	(United States) Michael (Saint Mary's) (United States) Wu (Georgetown)	(United States) Sharp (Western Michigan) (Republic of Ireland) **Molloy** (Penn State) (United States) Cervantes (UC Irvine) (United States) Robinson (Clemson)	(Germany) Yosef (Marshall) (England) Morris (Seattle) (Colombia) Cabrera Jr. (Butler) (Canada) Oluwaseyi (St. John's)
Oct. 29	(United States) Jacomen (Penn)	(France) Cayet (Temple) (Germany) Bergmann (Maryland)	(Portugal) Lima (Providence) (United States) Walker (Oregon State) (United States) Morris (Indiana) (United States) **Montes** (Georgetown)	(United States) Faletto (Houston Baptist) (United States) Bodily (Washington) (United States) Dexter (Pittsburgh) (United States) McLaughlin (SMU)
Nov. 5	(United States) Smith (Lehigh)	(France) Dumas (Notre Dame) (United States) Maher (Indiana) (United States) Haupt (UC Davis)	(England) Rees (Campbell) (United States) Maas (Utah Valley) (United States) Uderitz (Seattle)	(England) Hallahan (Michigan) (United States) Trager (Air Force) (England) Bentley (Missouri State) (England) **Sload** (Penn State)
Nov. 12	(Spain) Fernandez (Oregon State)	(New Zealand) Stroud (Missouri State) (Norway) Kristiansen (Rhode Island) (United States) Michael (Saint Mary's)	(Denmark) Wolf (Providence) (Kenya) Mayaka (Clemson) (Canada) Campbell (Temple) (United States) Thorsheim (Bucknell)	(United States) Butts (Penn State) (Colombia) **Cabrera Jr.** (Butler) (Sierra Leone) Michael (UCSB)
Nov. 19	(Jamaica) **Waite** (Fairleigh Dickinson)	(United States) Maher (Indiana) (United States) Kessler (Virginia) (United States) Bauer (New Hampshire) (United States) Munjoma (SMU)	(England) Rees (Campbell) (Brazil) Dolabella (Marshall) (United States) Velasquez (UC Davis) (Germany) Mohr (James Madison)	(United States) Judd (Denver) (Spain) Bravo (Iona)
Nov. 26	(United States) Thomas (Stanford)	(United States) Kessler (Virginia) (New Zealand) Billingsley (UCSB) (United States) Nealis (Georgetown)	(United States) Bodily (Washington) (United States) Ybarra (Michigan) (United States) DeZart (Wake Forest)	(United States) Jennings (Louisville) (United States) Strickler (Virginia Tech) (United States) Bezerra (Indiana) (United States) **Davock** (Providence)
Dec. 3	(United States) Roach (UCSB)	(United States) Kessler (Virginia) (United States) Munjoma (SMU) (United States) Bartlow (Washington) (United States) Hughes (Stanford) (Norway) Ueland (Virginia)	(United States) Waldeck (Stanford) (United States) **Montes** (Georgetown)	(United States) Robinson (Clemson) (United States) Holcomb (Wake Forest) (Canada) Baynham (UCSB)
Dec. 10	(United States) Pannenberg (Wake Forest)	(Canada) **Johnston** (Wake Forest) (United States) Beason (Stanford) (United States) Rula (Wake Forest)	(Brazil) Costa (SMU) (United States) Waldeck (Stanford) (United States) Parente (Wake Forest) (United States) Montes (Georgetown) (New Zealand) Bell (Virginia)	(United States) Dodson (Georgetown) (Nigeria) Dike (Virginia)

=== College Soccer News Team of the Week ===
- **Bold** denotes College Soccer News player of the week.

Team of the week
Week	Goalkeeper	Defenders	Midfielders	Forwards
Sep. 1	(United States) Rosenberg (Xavier) (United States) Heim (SIUE)	(United States) Hansen (St. John's) (Kenya) Kibunguchy (UC Davis) (United States) Hogan (Charlotte)	(Jamaica) Booth (FIU) (Mexico) Hernandez (SMU) (France) **Medilah** (FGCU) (Burkina Faso) Tambadu (Georgia Southern) (United States) Teves (Washington)	(United States) Trejo (CSUN) (United States) Elias (Seton Hall) (Norway) Engebretsen (Saint Mary's)
Sep. 8	(United States) Logan (Washington)	(France) Robin (Bowling Green) (United States) Goodall (Xavier) (Germany) Betz (Campbell)	(Spain) Crespo (Oregon State) (France) Chaouche (Charlotte) (Jamaica) McMaster (Wake Forest)	(Canada) Martineau (Mercer) (Israel) Hazut (UIC) (United States) Jennings (UCF) (Italy) Proch (Duke) (North Macedonia) **M. Iloski** (UCLA)
Sep. 15	(Canada) Baskett (William & Mary)	(United States) Easley (Grand Canyon) (United States) Nocita (Navy) (Germany) Afamefuna (Virginia)	(United States) Keller (Saint Louis) (Spain) Etxaniz (Longwood) (Haiti) Campoy (FIU) (Canada) Sawula (Oakland) (Brazil) Dolabella (Marshall)	(United States) Pinzon (CSUF) (Norway) Engebretsen (Saint Mary's) (England) **Smith** (Clemson) (United States) Ryan (Stanford)
Sep. 22	(United States) Jackson (LMU) (United States) Gutierrez (UC Riverside)	(Spain) Sena (Pitt) (England) Wilson (Drake)	(France) Djeffal (Oregon State) (Spain) Yuste (Yale) (United States) Montes (Georgetown) (United States) Petridis (St. John's) (Spain) **Ferriol** (James Madison) (Senegal) Dieye (Louisville)	(United States) Saramago (Loyola (MD)) (United States) Jennings (UCF) (Nigeria) Oladeinbo (Dayton) (United States) McLaughlin (SMU)
Sep. 29	(United States) Shutler (Virginia)	(New Zealand) Stroud (Missouri State) (United States) Golan (William & Mary)	(Spain) Muriel Albino (West Virginia) (United States) Megally (Loyola (Chicago)) (United States) Colacci (New Hampshire) (United States) Brito (Charlotte) (United States) Elmedkhar (Kentucky) (United States) Williamson (Duke)	(France) Jacquel (Campbell) (United States) **Luchini** (Lehigh) (Spain) Gonzalez (SIUE)
Oct. 6	(Netherlands) Swaneveld (Virginia Tech)	(Germany) Afamefuna (Virginia) (United States) Bustamante (St. John's)	(Norway) Akselsen (Rhode Island) (United States) Gabarra (NC State) (United States) Soronellas (North Florida) (United States) Bowie (Western Michigan) (New Zealand) Greive (Northern Kentucky) (United States) **Bodily** (Washington)	(Republic of Ireland) Goldsmith (CSUB) (Iceland) Sigurdarson (Boston College) (United States) White (NJIT)
Oct. 13	(United States) Schulte (Saint Louis)	(Venezuela) Saez (UNCW) (Ghana) Osmanu (Marshall) (United States) Benjamin (Hartford)	(United States) Conde (FIU) (Canada) Raposo (Syracuse)	(Sierra Leone) Michael (UCSB) (United States) Butts (Penn State) (France) Jacquel (Campbell) (United States) DaSilva (Albany) (Nigeria) **Achara** (Georgetown) (Spain) Berry (San Diego)
Oct. 20	(Italy) Gjergji (Butler)	(United States) Person (Saint Mary's) (United States) Nealis (Georgetown) (Brazil) De Luca (Memphis)	(United States) Colacci (New Hampshire) (Republic of Ireland) Molloy (Penn State) (United States) Sharp (Western Michigan) (Brazil) Lapa (Wake Forest) (Spain) Yuste (Yale) (United States) Robinson (Clemson)	(United States) Brigida (Oral Roberts) (England) Morris (Seattle) (Germany) **Yosef** (Marshall)
Oct. 27	(United States) Schulte (Saint Louis)	(France) Cayet (Temple) (Germany) Bergmann (Maryland) (United States) Kherat (Bradley)	(United States) Sullivan (Bowling Green) (United States) Morris (Indiana)	(Nigeria) Egbo (Akron) (Germany) Maertins (NIU) (United States) Faletto (Houston Baptist) (United States) McGlynn (Seattle) (United States) Cubero (NJIT) (United States) Dexter (Pitt) (United States) **McLaughlin** (SMU)
Nov. 3	(United States) Brady (South Carolina) (United States) Roach (UCSB)	(Spain) Suarez (Central Arkansas) (United States) Haupt (UC Davis) (United States) Clarke (Colgate)	(Germany) Westmeyer (Marshall) (United States) **Trager** (Air Force)	(United States) Hubbard (Furman) (England) Sload (Penn State) (United States) Goodrum (UNCW) (United States) Vowinkel (Hofstra) (England) Harris (Wake Forest)
Nov. 10	(United States) Thomas (Stanford)	(United States) Haupt (UC Davis) (Norway) Kristiansen (Rhode Island) (France) Robin (Bowling Green) (France) Deniel (Oregon State)	(Denmark) Wolf (Providence) (Denmark) Jensen (Central Arkansas) (United States) Sukow (Loyola (Chicago))	(Spain) Arribas (Fairleigh Dickinson) (England) Roberts (Marshall) (Spain) Pedra (UNCG) (Germany) **Wintermeyer** (Bradley) (United States) Thorsheim (Bucknell) (United States) Judd (Denver)
Nov. 17	(Jamaica) **Waite** (Fairleigh Dickinson)	(United States) Maher (Indiana) (United States) Munjoma (SMU) (Germany) Mohr (James Madison) (United States) Kessler (Virginia) (United States) Bauer (New Hampshire)	(United States) Plimpton (Iona) (England) Rees (Campbell) (United States) Parish (Washington)	(United States) Mickelson (UC Davis) (Wales) Snaith (Coastal Carolina) (Norway) Engebretsen (Saint Mary's)
Nov. 24	(United States) Gelnovatch (Louisville) (United States) Thomas (Stanford)	(United States) Nealis (Georgetown) (United States) Beason (Stanford)	(United States) Bodily (Washington) (Costa Rica) Vivi (UCF) (England) Corfe (Wright State)	(United States) Davock (Providence) (United States) **Bezerra** (Indiana) (United States) Barber (Clemson) (Sierra Leone) Michael (UCSB) (United States) Strickler (Virginia Tech)
Dec. 1	(United States) Makela (SMU)	(Norway) Ueland (Virginia) (United States) Munjoma (SMU) (Canada) Restrepo (UCSB) (United States) Bartlow (Washington)	(United States) **Montes** (Georgetown) (United States) Waldeck (Stanford)	(United States) Steedman (Virginia) (United States) Robinson (Clemson) (United States) Holcomb (Wake Forest) (Canada) Baynham (UCSB)

== Postseason ==
=== Conference winners and tournaments ===
Conference	Regular Season Champion(s)	Tournament Winner	Conference Tournament	Tournament Dates	Tournament Venue (City)
ACC	Atlantic-Clemson; Coastal-Virginia	Virginia	2019 Tournament	November 5–17	Quarterfinals and semifinals: Campus sites, hosted by higher seed Final: Sahlen's Stadium • Cary, North Carolina
America East	New Hampshire & Vermont (tied)	New Hampshire	2019 Tournament	November 9–17	Campus sites, hosted by higher seed
American	UCF	SMU	2019 Tournament	November 9–16	Quarterfinals: Campus sites, hosted by higher seed Semifinals and final: Hosted by regular-season champion
ASUN	NJIT	NJIT	2019 Tournament	November 8–16	Quarterfinals and semifinals: Campus sites, hosted by top two seeds Final: Hosted by top remaining seed
Atlantic 10	Rhode Island	Rhode Island	2019 Tournament	November 2–17	Quarterfinals: Campus sites, hosted by higher seed Semifinals and final: Jack Coffey Field • Bronx, New York
Big East	Georgetown	Georgetown	2019 Tournament	November 9–17	Campus sites, hosted by higher seed
Big South	Campbell	Campbell	2019 Tournament	November 10–17	Campus sites, hosted by higher seed
Big Ten	Indiana	Indiana	2019 Tournament	November 9–17	Quarterfinals: Campus sites, hosted by higher seed Semifinals and final: Ludwig Field • College Park, Maryland
Big West	UC Davis	UC Davis	2019 Tournament	November 6–16	Campus sites, hosted by higher seed
CAA	UNC Wilmington	James Madison	2019 Tournament	November 8–17	Quarterfinals and semifinals: Campus sites, hosted by top two seeds Final: Hosted by top remaining seed
C-USA	Marshall	Marshall	2019 Tournament	November 13–17	Old Dominion Soccer Complex • Norfolk, Virginia
Horizon	UIC	Wright State	2019 Tournament	November 11–16	Quarterfinals: Campus sites, hosted by #3 and #4 seeds Semifinals and final: Hosted by regular-season champion
Ivy	Yale		No Tournament		
MAAC	Saint Peter's	Iona	2019 Tournament	November 10–17	Campus sites, hosted by higher seed
MAC	Akron	West Virginia	2019 Tournament	November 12–17	Quarterfinals: Campus sites, hosted by higher seed Semifinals and final: Hosted by regular-season champion
Missouri Valley	Missouri State	Loyola Chicago	2019 Tournament	November 13–17	Loyola Soccer Park • Chicago, Illinois
Northeast	Merrimack *	Fairleigh Dickinson	2019 Tournament	November 15–17	Campus sites, hosted by higher seed
Pac-12	Washington		No Tournament		
Patriot	Lehigh	Lehigh	2019 Tournament	November 9–16	Campus sites, hosted by higher seed
SoCon	UNC Greensboro & Furman (tied)	Mercer	2019 Tournament	November 5–17	Campus sites, hosted by higher seed
The Summit	Oral Roberts; Western Illinois (tied)	Denver	2019 Tournament	November 14–16	CIBER Field • Denver, Colorado
Sun Belt	Central Arkansas	Coastal Carolina	2019 Tournament	November 13–17	ASU Soccer Stadium • Boone, North Carolina
WCC	Saint Mary's		No Tournament		
WAC	Seattle	Seattle	2019 Tournament	November 13–17	Cadet Soccer Stadium • U.S. Air Force Academy, Colorado

- * = Ineligible, in transition from DII

=== Postseason awards ===
==== Hermann Trophy ====
The Hermann Trophy is given to the year's most outstanding player. The finalists were announced on December 12. On January 4, 2020, Robbie Robinson of Clemson won the Hermann Trophy.

- Joe Bell – Virginia
- Dylan Nealis – Georgetown
- Robbie Robinson – Clemson

==== TDS National Player of the Year ====
The TopDrawerSoccer.com National Player of the Year Award recognizes the top college soccer player in the nation by the TDS staff. On December 23, 2019, Joe Bell of Virginia won the award.

- Joe Bell – Virginia

==== Senior CLASS Award ====
- The Senior CLASS Award is presented each year to the most outstanding senior in NCAA Division I. Elliot Panicco of Charlotte won the award. The following finalists were:
  - Tanner Beason (DF), Stanford
  - Gideon Betz (DF), Campbell
  - Drake Callender (GK), California
  - Anders Engebretsen (FW), Saint Mary's (CA)
  - Dayonn Harris (FW), UConn
  - Cal Jennings (FW), UCF
  - Garrett McLaughlin (FW), SMU
  - Elliot Panicco (GK), Charlotte
  - Mauricio Pineda (MF), North Carolina
  - Jack Skahan (MF), North Carolina

==== Conference player and coaches of the year ====
Conference	Conference Player of the Year	Offensive Player of the Year	Defensive Player of the Year	Midfielder of the Year	Goalkeeper of the Year	Rookie of the Year	Conference Coach of the Year
America East	—N/a	Austin DaSilva (Albany)	Josh Bauer (New Hampshire)	Antonio Colacci (New Hampshire)	Alejandro Robles (New Hampshire)	Rasmus Tobinski (Vermont)	Marc Hubbard (New Hampshire)
American	—N/a	Cal Jennings (UCF)	Eddie Munjoma (SMU)	Yoni Sorokin & Gabriel Costa (UCF) & (SMU)	Yannik Oettl (UCF)	Gino Vivi (UCF)	Scott Calabrese (UCF)
ACC	—N/a	Robbie Robinson (Clemson)	Malick Mbaye (Clemson)	Joe Bell (Virginia)	—N/a	Philip Mayaka (Clemson)	Mike Noonan (Clemson)
Atlantic Sun	Rene White (NJIT)	Rene White (NJIT)	Ian McCauley (Stetson)	Samuel Reisgys (NJIT)	—N/a	Alejandro Rabell (NJIT)	Fernando Barboto (NJIT)
Atlantic 10	—N/a	Jonas Fjeldberg (Dayton)	Joergen Oland (Fordham)	Kingsford Adjei (Dayton)	—N/a	Toluwalase Oladeinbo (Dayton)	Gareth Elliott (Rhode Island)
Big East	—N/a	Tani Oluwasey (St. John's)	Dylan Nealis (Georgetown)	Jacob Montes (Georgetown)	Giannis Nikopolidis & Jan Hoffelner (Georgetown) & (St. John's)	Wilmer Cabrera Jr. (Butler)	Dave Masur (St. John's)
Big South	—N/a	Thibaut Jacquel (Campbell)	Gideon Betz (Campbell)	—N/a	—N/a	Moses Mensah (Campbell)	Dustin Fonder (Campbell)
Big Ten	—N/a	Nebojša Popović (Michigan)	Aaron Molloy (Penn State)	Jack Maher (Indiana)	Andrew Verdi (Michigan)	Aidan Morris (Indiana)	Todd Yeagley (Indiana)
Big West	—N/a	Danny Trejo (Cal State Northridge)	Noah Billingsley (UC Santa Barbara)	Victor Falck & Thibault Candia (UC Irvine) & (UC Santa Barbara)	Wallis Lapsley (UC Davis)	Finn Ballard-McBride (UC Santa Barbara)	Dwayne Shaffer (UC Davis)
Colonial	Manuel Ferriol (James Madison)	Manuel Ferriol (James Madison)	Danny Reynolds (UNCW)	—N/a	—N/a	Timothy Ennin (Northeastern)	Aidan Heaney (UNCW)
Conference USA	Aimé Mabika (Kentucky)	Milo Yosef (Marshall)	Aimé Mabika & Nick O'Callaghan (Kentucky) & (FIU)	Andrew Booth (FIU)	Elliot Panicco & Paulo Pita (Charlotte) & (Marshall)	Milo Yosef (Marshall)	Chris Grassie (Marshall)
Horizon	Jesus Perez (UIC)	Bar Hozut (UIC)	Jacob Graiber (UIC)	—N/a	Sullivan Lauderdale (Oakland)	Robert Alonso (UIC)	Sean Phillips (UIC)
Ivy	—N/a	Mark Winhoffer (Yale)	Alex Touche (Penn)	—N/a	—N/a	Uri Zeitz (Columbia)	Kylie Stannard (Yale)
MAAC	—N/a	Dominic Laws (Saint Peter's)	Malcolm Moreno (Iona)	—N/a	Samuel Ilin (Marist)	Tomas Svecula (Quinnipiac)	Julian Richens (Saint Peter's)
Mid-American	Jorge Gonzalez (SIUE)	—N/a	—N/a	—N/a	—N/a	Charlie Sharp (Western Michigan)	Jared Embick (Akron)
Missouri Valley	Aidan Megally (Loyola Chicago)	Matthew Bentley (Missouri State)	Kyle Hiebert (Missouri State)	—N/a	Michael Creek (Missouri State)	Andy Mitchell (Loyola Chicago)	Jon Leamy (Missouri State)
Northeast	Lucas Rosa (Saint Francis Pa.)	—N/a	Mirko Nufi (Merrimack)	—N/a	—N/a	Papa Ndoye (LIU)	Tony Martone (Merrimack)
Pac-12	Blake Bodily (Washington)	—N/a	Ethan Bartlow (Washington)	—N/a	—N/a	Ousseni Bouda (Stanford)	Jamie Clark (Washington)
Patriot	—N/a	Josh Luchini (Lehigh)	Matt Nocita (Navy)	Barry Sharifi (Loyola Md.)	Will Smith (Lehigh)	Daniel Osuji (Loyola Md.)	Dean Koski (Lehigh)
Southern	Casey Penland (UNCG)	—N/a	—N/a	—N/a	Josh Perryman (ETSU)	Adrian Roseth (Wofford)	Doug Allison (Furman)
Summit	—N/a	Tanguy Guerineau (Oral Roberts)	Paul Kirdorf (Western Illinois)	—N/a	Miles Motakef (Oral Roberts)	Reed Barry (Oral Roberts)	Ryan Bush & Eric Johnson (Oral Roberts) & (Western Illinois)
Sun Belt	Niklas Brodacki (Central Arkansas)	Aris Briggs (Georgia State)	Zeiko Harris (Appalachian State)	—N/a	—N/a	Sam Snaith (Coastal Carolina)	Ross Duncan (Central Arkansas)
WAC	—N/a	Blake Frischknecht (Utah Valley)	Nkosi Burgess (Seattle U)	—N/a	—N/a	James Morris (Seattle U)	Pete Fewing (Seattle U)
West Coast	Anders Engebretsen & Miguel Berry (Saint Mary's) & (San Diego)	Miguel Barry (San Diego)	Filippo Zattarin (Saint Mary's)	Anders Engebretsen (Saint Mary's)	Remi Prieur (Saint Mary's)	Noel Caliskan (LMU)	Adam Cooper (Saint Mary's)

=== Other major awards ===
- United Soccer Coaches College Coach of the Year: Brian Wiese, Georgetown
- Bill Jeffrey Award: Steve Clements, Tyler Junior College
- Glenn Myernick Award:
- Jerry Yeagley Award: Ann Murphy, Saint Louis
- Mike Berticelli Award: Roy Dunshee, Washington College
- NCAA Division I Men's Soccer Tournament Most Outstanding Player:
  - Offensive: Daryl Dike, Virginia
  - Defensive: Dylan Nealis, Georgetown
- TopDrawerSoccer.com National Freshman of the Year Award: Aidan Morris, Indiana

=== Final rankings ===
Rank	United Soccer Coaches	TopDrawerSoccer.com	College Soccer News
1	Georgetown	Georgetown	Georgetown
2	Virginia	Virginia	Virginia
3	Wake Forest	Wake Forest	Stanford
4	Stanford	Stanford	Wake Forest
5	Clemson	SMU	SMU
6	Washington	Washington	Clemson
7	SMU	UC Santa Barbara	Washington
8	UC Santa Barbara	Clemson	UC Santa Barbara
9	Indiana	Indiana	Indiana
10	UCF (Central Florida)	UCF	UCF
11	Marshall	Providence	Missouri State
12	St, John's	Virginia Tech	Marshall
13	Virginia Tech	Michigan	Saint Mary's
14	Providence	Louisville	Michigan
15	Saint Mary's	Marshall	Providence
16	Missouri State	St, John's	Seattle
17	Michigan	Missouri State	Virginia Tech
18	Penn State	Penn State	Louisville
19	Seattle	Charlotte	St. John's
20	Louisville	Maryland	Penn State
21	Charlotte	UC Davis	Kentucky
22	New Hampshire	Saint Mary's	New Hampshire
23	Kentucky	New Hampshire	Charlotte
24	Campbell	Wright State	UC Davis
25	UC Davis	Boston College	Canpbell
26			Maryland
27			Boston College
28			Yale
29			Pittsburgh
30			Coastal Carolina

== Statistics ==
=== Individuals ===
Goals
Rank	Scorer	School	Games	Goals
1	(United States) Robbie Robinson	Clemson	19	18
	(United States) Cal Jennings	UCF	20	18
	(France) Thibaut Jacquel	Campbell	21	18
4	(North Macedonia) Milan Iloski	UCLA	16	17
	(Spain) Miguel Berry	San Diego	18	17
	(United States) Rene White	NJIT	19	17
7	(Norway) Anders Engebretsen	Saint Mary's	16	18
	(United States) Aris Briggs	Georgia State	20	16
	(Spain) Manuel Ferriol	James Madison	21	16
	(United States) Garrett McLaughlin	SMU	21	16

As of January 22, 2020

01/22---Well after the end of the season, the NCAA Goals Against Average stats are still incomplete & incorrect...

GOALS AGAINST AVERAGE
Rank	Keeper	School	Games	Minutes	GA	GAA
1						
2						
3						
4						
5						
6						
7						
8						
9						
10						

Last update on p1/22

ASSISTS
Rank	Player	School	Games	Assists
1	Knut Ahlander	SMU	21	13
2	Tanguy Guerineau	Oral Roberts	15	12
	Edvin Akselsen	Rhode Island	21	12
4	Gabriel Costa	SMU	18	11
	Louis Perez	UCF	19	11
6	Jamil Roberts	Marshall	18	10
	Mark Winhoffer	Yale	18	10
	Tanner Dieterich	Clemson	20	10
	Trevor Martineau	Mercer	21	10
10	17 players tied		17–22	9

Last update on 01/22

01/22---Well after the end of the season, the NCAA Save Percentage stats are still incomplete & incorrect...

SAVE PERCENTAGE
Rank	Keeper	School	Games	Minutes	Saves	GA	Save %
1							
2							
3							
4							
5							
6							
7							
8							
9							
10							

Last update on 01/22

TOTAL POINTS
Rank	Player	School	Games	Goals	Assists	Points
1	Robbie Robinson	Clemson	19	18	9	47
2	Miguel Berry	San Diego	18	17	8	42
3	Thibaut Jacquel	Campbell	21	18	5	41
4	Anders Engebretsen	Saint Mary's	18	16	8	40
	Cal Jennings	UCF	20	18	4	40
6	Trevor Martineau	Mercer	21	14	10	38
7	Ryan Raposo	Syracuse	20	15	7	37
	Manuel Ferriol	James Madison	21	16	5	37
	Garrett McLaughlin	SMU	21	16	5	37
2	Milan Iloski	UCLA	16	17	2	36
	Rene White	NJIT	19	17	2	36
	Deri Corfe	Wright State	22	14	9	36

Last update on 01/22

01/22---Well after the end of the season, the NCAA's Total Saves stats still lack games played data...

TOTAL SAVES
Rank	Keeper	School	Games	Saves
1	Broden Schull	VMI		117
2	Paul-Andre Guerin	Cal St. Fullerton		94
	Tor Erik Larsen	Purdue Fort Wayne		94
4	Gabriel Gjergji	Butler		92
5	Jimmy Slayton	Hartford		91
6	Carlos Caro	Howard		90
	Tim Trilk	Western Illinois		90
8	Ben Roach	UC Santa Barbara		88
	Joel Sundell	Wright State		88
10	Will Smith	Lehigh		87

Last update on 01/22

- Individual statistics are through the games of December 15, 2019

=== Teams ===
SCORING OFFENSE
Rank	School	Games	Goals	Goals/Game
1	Clemson	22	70	3.182
2	SMU	21	63	3.000
3	Campbell	18	47	2.682
4	Saint Mary's	12	35	2.611
5	UIC	18	46	2.556
6	Georgetown	24	58	2.417
7	Oral Roberts	17	41	2.412
8	NJIT	19	44	2.316
9	FIU	18	41	2.278
10	Saint Peter's	19	43	1.263

Last update on 01/24

SCORING DEFENSE (Team Goals Against Average)
Rank	School	Games	Minutes	GA	Team GAA
1	New Hampshire	20	1875	11	0.5280
2	Virginia	24	2215	13	0.5282
3	Georgetown	24	2255	14	0.559
4	Navy	17	1568	10	0.574
5	UC Davis	20	1858	13	0.630
6	Missouri State	20	1852	13	0.632
7	Charlotte	20	1912	14	0.659
8	Washington	21	1904	14	0.662
9	Indiana	22	2115	16	0.681
10	Stanford	22	2093	16	0.688

Last update on 01/24

SHUTOUT PERCENTAGE
Rank	School	Games	Shutouts	Shutout %
1	New Hampshire	20	13	.650
2	Virginia	24	15	.625
3	Saint Mary's	18	11	.611
4	Navy	17	10	.588
5	Washington	21	12	.571
6	Georgetown	24	13	.542
7	Bowling Green	21	11	.524
	Maryland	21	11	.524
	SMU	21	11	.524
10	6 teams tied	16–24	8–12	.500

Last update on 01/24

- Team statistics are through the games of December 15, 2019

WON-LOST-TIED PERCENTAGE
Rank	School	Wins	Loses	Ties	W-L-T %
1	Missouri State	18	1	1	.925
2	Georgetown	20	1	3	.896
	Virginia	21	2	1	.893
4	Saint Mary's	16	2	0	.889
5	SMU	18	2	1	.881
6	Clemson	18	2	2	.864
7	New Hampshire	15	2	3	.825
8	Campbell	17	3	2	.818
9	Washington	17	4	0	.810
10	UCF	15	3	2	.800

Last update on 01/24

== See also ==
- College soccer
- List of NCAA Division I men's soccer programs
- 2019 in American soccer
- 2019 NCAA Division I Men's Soccer Tournament
- 2019 NCAA Division I women's soccer season
