= 2019 NCAA Division I men's soccer tournament =

- Classification: Division I
- Teams: 48
- Matches: 47
- Site: WakeMed Soccer Park (semifinal and Final); Cary, North Carolina
- Champions: Georgetown (1st title)
- MVP: Offense: Daryl Dike (Virginia); Defense: Dylan Nealis (Georgetown)
- Broadcast: ESPNU

The 2019 NCAA Division I men's soccer tournament was the 61st edition of the NCAA Division I men's soccer tournament, a postseason tournament to determine the national champion of NCAA Division I men's college soccer. The first four rounds of the competition were held at the home ground of the higher seed, while the College Cup (semifinals and final) were held at WakeMed Soccer Park in Cary, North Carolina. The championship match took place December 15, 2019.

== Qualification ==
As in previous editions of the NCAA Division I Tournament, the tournament features 48 participants out of a possible field of 203 teams. Of the 48 berths, 24 are allocated to the 21 conference tournament champions and to the regular season winners of the Ivy League, Pac-12 Conference, and West Coast Conference, which do not have tournaments. The remaining 24 berths are supposed to be determined through an at-large process based upon the Ratings Percentage Index (RPI) of teams that did not automatically qualify.

The NCAA Selection Committee also names the top sixteen seeds for the tournament, with those teams receiving an automatic bye into the second round of the tournament. The remaining 32 teams play in a single-elimination match in the first round of the tournament for the right to play a seeded team in the second round.

=== Qualified teams ===
Team	Qualified as	Qualified on	Qualification type	Previous appearances in tournament	Previous best performance
Campbell	Big South Champions	November 17, 2019	Automatic	2 (2007, 2018)	First Round (2007, 2018)
Coastal Carolina	Sun Belt Champions	November 17, 2019	Automatic	15 (1992, 1995, 2001, 2002, 2003, 2004, 2005, 2010, 2011, 2012, 2013, 2014, 2015, 2016, 2017)	Third Round (2003, 2012, 2013, 2017)
Denver	Summit League Champions	November 16, 2019	Automatic	8 (1970, 2008, 2010, 2013, 2014, 2015, 2016, 2018)	Semifinals (2016)
Fairleigh Dickinson	NEC Champions	November 17, 2019	Automatic	15 (1963, 1964, 1967, 1968, 1975, 1982, 1983, 1984, 1988, 1989, 2001, 2002, 2003, 2008, 2012)	Quarterfinals (1983, 1984, 2001)
Georgetown	Big East Champions	November 17, 2019	Automatic	8 (1994, 1997, 2010, 2012, 2014, 2015, 2017, 2018)	Runners-up (2012)
Indiana	Big Ten Champions	November 17, 2019	Automatic	43 (1974, 1976, 1977, 1978, 1979, 1980, 1981, 1982, 1983, 1984, 1985, 1987, 1988, 1989, 1990, 1991, 1992, 1993, 1994, 1995, 1996, 1997, 1998, 1999, 2000, 2001, 2002, 2003, 2004, 2005, 2006, 2007, 2008, 2009, 2010, 2011, 2012, 2013, 2014, 2015, 2016, 2017, 2018)	Champions (1982, 1983, 1988, 1998, 1999, 2003, 2004, 2012)
Iona	MAAC Champions	November 17, 2019	Automatic	None (Debut)	—
James Madison	CAA Champions	November 16, 2019	Automatic	15 (1971, 1972, 1973, 1976, 1992, 1993, 1994, 1995, 1996, 2000, 2001, 2005, 2011, 2014, 2018)	Quarterfinals (1994, 2018)
Lehigh	Patriot League Champions	November 16, 2019	Automatic	5 (1995, 1998, 2003, 2005, 2012)	Third Round (1995)
Loyola Chicago	MVC Champions	November 17, 2019	Automatic	4 (2006, 2008, 2011, 2016)	Second Round (2016)
Marshall	C-USA Champions	November 17, 2019	Automatic	None (Debut)	—
Mercer	SoCon Champions	November 17, 2019	Automatic	3 (2001, 2016, 2017)	First Round (2001, 2016, 2017)
New Hampshire	America East Champions	November 17, 2019	Automatic	3 (1994, 2017, 2018)	Round of 16 (2017)
NJIT	Atlantic Sun Champions	November 16, 2019	Automatic	None (Debut)	—
Rhode Island	Atlantic 10 Champions	November 17, 2019	Automatic	12 (1972, 1976, 1977, 1979, 1995, 1996, 1999, 2000, 2003, 2005, 2006, 2018)	Quarterfinals (1979)
Saint Mary's (Cal.)	WCC Champions	November 17, 2019	Automatic	3 (2009, 2011, 2018)	Quarterfinals (2011)
Seattle	WAC Champions	November 17, 2019	Automatic	3 (2013, 2015, 2017)	Third Round (2015)
SMU	The American Champions	November 16, 2019	Automatic	31 (1979, 1980, 1983, 1984, 1985, 1986, 1987, 1988, 1989, 1990, 1991, 1992, 1993, 1994, 1995, 1996, 1997, 1998, 2000, 2001, 2002, 2004, 2005, 2006, 2007, 2009, 2010, 2011, 2012, 2015, 2017 ,2018)	Semifinals (2000, 2005)
UC Davis	Big West Champions	November 17, 2019	Automatic	2 (2007, 2008)	Second Round (2008)
Virginia	ACC Champions	November 17, 2019	Automatic	40 (1969, 1979, 1981, 1982, 1983, 1984, 1985, 1986, 1987, 1988, 1989, 1990, 1991, 1992, 1993, 1994, 1995, 1996, 1997, 1998, 1999, 2000, 2001, 2002, 2003, 2004, 2005, 2006, 2007, 2008, 2009, 2010, 2011, 2012, 2013, 2014, 2015, 2016, 2017, 2018)	Champions (1989, 1991, 1992, 1993, 1994, 2009, 2014)
Washington	Pac-12 Champions	November 16, 2019	Automatic	25 (1968, 1972, 1973, 1976, 1978, 1982, 1989, 1992, 1995, 1996, 1997, 1998, 1999, 2000, 2001, 2003, 2004, 2006, 2007, 2012, 2013, 2014, 2016, 2017, 2018)	Quarterfinals (2013)
West Virginia	MAC Champions	November 17, 2019	Automatic	12 (1966, 1968, 1971, 1972, 1973, 1981, 1992, 2005, 2006, 2007, 2010, 2011)	Quarterfinals (1981)
Wright State	Horizon League Champions	November 16, 2019	Automatic	None (Debut)	—
Yale	Ivy League Champions	November 16, 2019	Automatic	6 (1973, 1986, 1989, 1991, 1999, 2005)	Quarterfinals (1991)
Clemson	No. 4 RPI	November 18, 2019	At-Large Bid	31 (1972, 1973, 1974, 1975, 1976, 1977, 1978, 1979, 1981, 1982, 1983, 1984, 1985, 1987, 1990, 1991, 1993, 1995, 1997, 1998, 2000, 2001, 2002, 2003, 2005, 2006, 2013, 2014, 2015, 2016, 2017)	Champions (1984, 1987)
UCF	No. 5 RPI	November 18, 2019	At-Large Bid	6 (2002, 2003, 2004, 2010, 2011, 2018)	Second Round (2004, 2010, 2011, 2018)
Wake Forest	No. 6 RPI	November 19, 2019	At-Large Bid	22 (1988, 1989, 1990, 1991, 1999, 2001, 2002, 2003, 2004, 2005, 2006, 2007, 2008, 2009, 2011, 2012, 2013, 2014, 2015, 2016, 2017, 2018)	Champions (2007)
Virginia Tech	No. 7 RPI	November 19, 2019	At-Large Bid	7 (2003, 2005, 2006, 2007, 2016, 2017, 2018)	Semifinals (2007)
St. John's (NY)	No. 9 RPI	November 19, 2019	At-Large Bid	20 (1992, 1993, 1994, 1995, 1996, 1997, 1998, 1999, 2000, 2001, 2002, 2003, 2004, 2005, 2006, 2008, 2009, 2011, 2012, 2013)	Champions (1996)
Missouri State	No. 12 RPI	November 19, 2019	At-Large Bid	3 (1997, 1999, 2009)	First Round (1997, 1999, 2009)
Stanford	No. 13 RPI	November 19, 2019	At-Large Bid	17 (1962, 1978, 1991, 1992, 1997, 1998, 1999, 2000, 2001, 2002, 2009, 2013, 2014, 2015, 2016, 2017, 2018)	Champions (2015, 2016, 2017)
Providence	No. 14 RPI	November 19, 2019	At-Large Bid	9 (1983, 2005, 2006, 2007, 2010, 2011, 2013, 2014, 2016)	Semifinals (2014)
Michigan	No. 17 RPI	November 19, 2019	At-Large Bid	7 (2003, 2004, 2008, 2010, 2012, 2017, 2018)	Semifinals (2010)
Notre Dame	No. 19 RPI	November 19, 2019	At-Large Bid	21 (1988, 1993, 1994, 1996, 2001, 2002, 2003, 2004, 2005, 2006, 2007, 2008, 2009, 2010, 2012, 2013, 2014, 2015, 2016, 2017, 2018)	Champions (2013)
Penn State	No. 20 RPI	November 19, 2019	At-Large Bid	32 (1970, 1971, 1972, 1973, 1974, 1975, 1976, 1977, 1978, 1979, 1980, 1981, 1982, 1984, 1985, 1986, 1988, 1989, 1992, 1993, 1994, 1995, 1998, 1999, 2001, 2002, 2004, 2005, 2009, 2010, 2013, 2014)	Semifinals (1979)
Kentucky	No. 21 RPI	November 19, 2019	At-Large Bid	9 (1999, 2000, 2001, 2003, 2012, 2014, 2015, 2016, 2018)	Quarterfinals (2018)
Charlotte	No. 22 RPI	November 19, 2019	At-Large Bid	13 (1991, 1992, 1994, 1996, 1997, 2009, 2011, 2012, 2013, 2014, 2015, 2016, 2018)	Runners-up (2011)
UC Santa Barbara	No. 23 RPI	November 19, 2019	At-Large Bid	12 (2002, 2003, 2004, 2005, 2006, 2007, 2008, 2009, 2010, 2011, 2013, 2015)	Champions (2006)
Butler	No. 24 RPI	November 19, 2019	At-Large Bid	8 (1995, 1997, 1998, 2001, 2009, 2010, 2016, 2017)	Third Round (1995, 1998, 2017)
Loyola Marymount	No. 25 RPI	November 19, 2019	At-Large Bid	6 (2001, 2002, 2003, 2004, 2009, 2013)	Second Round (2002, 2004)
Maryland	No. 26 RPI	November 19, 2019	At-Large Bid	36 (1959, 1960, 1961, 1962, 1963, 1964, 1967, 1968, 1969, 1970, 1976, 1986, 1994, 1995, 1996, 1997, 1998, 1999, 2001, 2002, 2003, 2004, 2005, 2006, 2007, 2008, 2009, 2010, 2011, 2012, 2013, 2014, 2015, 2016, 2017, 2018)	Champions (1968, 2005, 2008, 2018)
Louisville	No. 27 RPI	November 19, 2019	At-Large Bid	11 (2007, 2008, 2009, 2010, 2011, 2012, 2013, 2014, 2016, 2017, 2018)	Runners-up (2010)
Boston College	No. 28 RPI	November 19, 2019	At-Large Bid	14 (1982, 1990, 2000, 2001, 2002, 2004, 2007, 2008, 2009, 2010, 2011, 2012, 2015, 2016	Quarterfinals (2002, 2015)
Syracuse	No. 30 RPI	November 19, 2019	At-Large Bid	6 (1984, 2012, 2014, 2015, 2016, 2018)	Semifinals (2015)
Pittsburgh	No. 31 RPI	November 19, 2019	At-Large Bid	2 (1962, 1965)	First Round (1962, 1965)
South Florida	No. 32 RPI	November 19, 2019	At-Large Bid	2 (2001, 2007)	Third Round (2007)
NC State	No. 35 RPI	November 19, 2019	At-Large Bid	15 (1981, 1983, 1984, 1985, 1986, 1987, 1990, 1991, 1992, 1994, 2003, 2005, 2009, 2017, 2018)	Semifinals (1990)

=== Seeded teams ===
Seeded teams
Seed	School	Conference	Record	Berth type	United Soccer Coaches ranking	RPI ranking
1	Virginia	6–1–1	17–1–1	Automatic	1st	1st
2	Clemson	6–1–1	16–2–1	At-Large	3rd	4th
3	Georgetown	7–0–2	15–1–3	Automatic	2nd	2nd
4	Wake Forest	6–2–0	13–4–2	At-Large	9th	6th
5	Indiana	7–1–0	14–2–4	Automatic	6th	11th
6	Washington	8–2–0	15–3–0	Automatic	4th	8th
7	Stanford	6–2–2	13–2–3	At-Large	7th	13th
8	SMU	5–1–1	16–1–1	Automatic	5th	3rd
9	UCF	6–0–1	14–2–2	At-Large	8th	5th
10	Virginia Tech	2–4–2	9–5–3	At-Large	23rd	7th
11	Marshall	5–1–1	15–2–3	Automatic	11th	10th
12	Saint Mary's (Cal.)	7–0–0	16–1–0	Automatic	10th	15th
13	Michigan	4–1–3	11–4–5	At-Large	17th	17th
14	UC Davis	5–1–1	13–4–2	Automatic	18th	18th
15	Penn State	6–1–1	12–3–3	At-Large	13th	20th
16	St. John's (NY)	6–2–1	13–4–1	At-Large	14th	9th

== Schedule ==
Round	Date
First round	November 21
Second round	November 24
Third round	November 29–Dec 1
Quarterfinals	Dec 6−Dec 8
College Cup Semifinals	December 13
College Cup Final	December 15

== Bracket ==
=== Regional 1 ===
First Round; November 21, 2019
James Madison*	1
Campbell	3
Syracuse*	3
Rhode Island	2
Missouri State*	1
Denver	0
NC State*	2
Coastal Carolina (OT)	3

Second Round; November 24, 2019
1	Virginia*	2
Campbell	0
Syracuse	1
16	St. John's*	2
9	UCF (OT)*	2
Missouri State	1
Coastal Carolina	0
8	SMU* (OT)	1

Third Round; Nov. 29–Dec. 1, 2019
1	Virginia*	3
16	St. John's	0
9	UCF	1
8	SMU (OT)*	2

Quarterfinals; December 6–8, 2019
1	Virginia* (OT)	3
8	SMU	2

Host Institution*

=== Regional 2 ===
First Round; November 21, 2019
Kentucky* (OT)	2
Loyola Chicago	1
UC Santa Barbara*	3
California	1
Notre Dame*	2
Wright State	3
Maryland*	4
Iona	0

Second Round; November 22–24, 2019
5	Indiana*	3
Kentucky	0
UC Santa Barbara	4
12	Saint Mary's (Cal.)*	0
13	Michigan* (pen.)	0 (5)
Wright State	0 (4)
Maryland*	0
4	Wake Forest*	3

Third Round; Nov. 29–Dec. 1, 2019
5	Indiana*	0
UC Santa Barbara (OT)	1
13	Michigan	1
4	Wake Forest*	3

Quarterfinals; December 6–8, 2019
UC Santa Barbara	0
4	Wake Forest*	1

Host Institution*

=== Regional 3 ===
First Round; November 21, 2019
Pittsburgh*	2
Lehigh	0
Louisville*	4
South Florida	1
Butler*	1
West Virginia	5
Boston College*	3
Yale	0

Second Round; November 24, 2019
3	Georgetown*	5
Pittsburgh	0
Louisville	1
14	UC Davis*	0
11	Marshall*	2
West Virginia	1
Boston College	0
6	Washington*	2

Third Round; Nov. 29–Dec. 1, 2019
3	Georgetown*	5
Louisville	1
11	Marshall	1
6	Washington*	4

Quarterfinals; December 6–8, 2019
3	Georgetown*	2
6	Washington	1

Host Institution*

=== Regional 4 ===
First Round; November 19–20, 2019
LMU*	1
Seattle U	3
New Hampshire*	1
Fairleigh Dickinson	0
Providence*	2
NJIT	0
Charlotte*	3
Mercer	1

Second Round; November 22–24, 2019
7	Stanford* (pen.)	1 (2)
Seattle U	1 (1)
New Hampshire	1
10	Virginia Tech*	4
15	Penn State*	2
Providence (OT)	3
Charlotte	1
2	Clemson (OT)*	2

Third Round; Nov. 29–Dec. 1, 2019
7	Stanford*	2
10	Virginia Tech	1
Providence	1
2	Clemson* (OT)	2

Quarterfinals; December 6–8, 2019
7	Stanford (pen.)	1 (5)
2	Clemson*	1 (4)

Host Institution*

=== 2019 College Cup ===
Semifinals; December 13 @ 6.00pm EST; WakeMed Soccer Park; Cary, North Carolina
1	Virginia	2
4	Wake Forest	1
3	Georgetown	2
7	Stanford	0

Championship; December 15 @ 6.00pm EST; WakeMed Soccer Park; Cary, North Carolina
1	Virginia	3 (6)
3	Georgetown	3 (7)

== Results ==
=== First round ===
November 21, 2019	New Hampshire	1–0	Fairleigh Dickinson	Durham, New Hampshire
6:00 p.m. EDT	Kamal 76'	Report		Stadium: Wildcat Stadium; Attendance: 1,578; Referee: Jason Ayotte

November 21, 2019	Butler	1–5	West Virginia	Indianapolis, Indiana
6:00 p.m. EDT	Myers 21'	Report	Grajera 3' (pen.), 81'; Albino 36'; DiMatteo 80', 84'	Stadium: Sellick Bowl; Attendance: 312; Referee: Shane Butler

November 21, 2019	James Madison	1–3	Campbell	Harrisonburg, Virginia
7:00 p.m. EDT	Long IV 88'	Report	Lock 54'; Dotte 77'; Jacquel 81'	Stadium: Sentara Park; Attendance: 684; Referee: Sergio Gonzalez

November 21, 2019	Syracuse	3–2	Rhode Island	Syracuse, New York
7:00 p.m. EDT	Archimède 33'; Raposo 33', 87' (pen.)	Report	Tamburini 31'; Kolakofsky 70'	Stadium: SU Soccer Stadium; Attendance: 472; Referee: Jim Pashalidis

November 21, 2019	NC State	2–3 (a.e.t.)	Coastal Carolina	Raleigh, North Carolina
7:00 p.m. EDT	Loera 22', 74'	Report	Rzepecki 37'; Skraep 64'; Mondi 104'	Stadium: Dail Soccer Stadium; Attendance: 538; Referee: Mark Gorak

November 21, 2019	Kentucky	2–1 (a.e.t.)	Loyola Chicago	Lexington, Kentucky
7:00 p.m. EDT	Reyes 82' (pen.); Bjorgolfsson 101'	Report	Mitchell 36'	Stadium: Bell Soccer Complex; Attendance: 1,110; Referee: Eric Tattersall

November 21, 2019	Notre Dame	2–3	Wright State	South Bend, Indiana
7:00 p.m. EDT	Lynn 51'; Rea 85'	Report	Hummel 27'; Beaton 70'; Corfe 72'	Stadium: Alumni Stadium; Attendance: 274; Referee: Calin Radosav

November 21, 2019	Maryland	4–0	Iona	College Park, Maryland
7:00 p.m. EDT	Gielen 20'; Matzelevich 65'; Johnston 73'; Brown 82' (pen.)	Report		Stadium: Ludwig Field; Attendance: 751; Referee: Guido Gonzalea

November 21, 2019	Pittsburgh	2–0	Lehigh	Pittsburgh, Pennsylvania
7:00 p.m. EDT	Kizza 18'; Washington 44'	Report		Stadium: Ambrose Urbanic Field; Attendance: 1,321; Referee: Sorin Stoica

November 21, 2019	Boston College	3–0	Yale	Chestnut Hill, Massachusetts
7:00 p.m. EDT	Konradsson 16'; Suski 39'; Sigurdarson 43'	Report		Stadium: Newton Soccer Complex; Attendance: 520; Referee: Robert Sibiga

November 21, 2019	Providence	2–0	NJIT	Providence, Rhode Island
7:00 p.m. EDT	Davock 10'; Wolf 65'	Report		Stadium: Anderson Stadium; Attendance: 1,650; Referee: Bruno Mozzo

November 21, 2019	Charlotte	3–1	Mercer	Charlotte, North Carolina
7:00 p.m. EDT	Johnson 23'; Pellerin 39'; Hogan 84'	Report	Harrison 14'	Stadium: Transamerica Field; Attendance: 1,476; Referee: Brian Miller

November 21, 2019	Louisville	4–1	South Florida	Louisville, Kentucky
7:30 p.m. EDT	Sample 21'; Fonseca 23'; Jennings 69'; Dieye 82'	Report	Monge 68'	Stadium: Lynn Stadium; Attendance: 402; Referee: Aaron Hernandez

November 21, 2019	Missouri State	1–0	Denver	Springfield, Missouri
8:00 p.m. EDT	Bentley 72'	Report		Stadium: Betty & Bobby Allison South Stadium; Attendance: 1,087; Referee: Jon Freemon

November 21, 2019	Loyola Marymount	1–3	Seattle U	Los Angeles, California
10:00 p.m. EDT	Williams 53'	Report	Noblat 41'; Ortiz 55'; Kurtz 79'	Stadium: Sullivan Field; Attendance: 961; Referee: Frank Anderson

November 21, 2019	UC Santa Barbara	3–1	California	Santa Barbara, California
10:00 p.m. EDT	Michael 18'; Candia 65' (pen.); Baynham 73'	Report	Gomez 38'	Stadium: Harder Stadium; Attendance: 1,256; Referee: Bernhard Hosu

=== Second round ===
November 24, 2019	No. 3 Georgetown	5–0	Pittsburgh	Washington, D.C.
12:00 p.m. EDT	Nealis 5', 65'; Dodson 13'; Sessock 20' (o.g.); McCune 82'	Report		Stadium: Shaw Field; Attendance: 1,497; Referee: Sergio Gonzalez

November 24, 2019	No. 5 Indiana	3–0	Kentucky	Bloomington, Indiana
12:00 p.m. EDT	Bezerra 21', 30', 63'	Report		Stadium: Bill Armstrong Stadium; Attendance: 1,106; Referee: Nikola Aleksić

November 24, 2019	No. 13 Michigan	0–0 (a.e.t.) (5–4 p)	Wright State	Ann Arbor, Michigan
1:00 p.m. EDT	Popovic (penalty scored); Swiech (penalty scored); Broche (penalty scored); Hallahan (penalty scored); Ybarra (penalty scored)	Report	(penalty scored) Hannema; (penalty scored) Corfe; (penalty missed) Slade; (penalty scored) Rokvic; (penalty scored) Dietrich	Stadium: U-M Soccer Stadium; Attendance: 1,048; Referee: Sorin Stoica

November 24, 2019	No. 1 Virginia	2–0	Campbell	Charlottesville, Virginia
1:00 p.m. EDT	Patton 38'; Crofts 85'	Report		Stadium: Klöckner Stadium; Attendance: 1,460; Referee: Bill Dittmar

November 24, 2019	No. 11 Marshall	2–1	West Virginia	Huntington, West Virginia
2:00 p.m. EDT	Roberts 10'; Yosef 43'	Report	Lucas 39'	Stadium: Hoops Family Field; Attendance: 2,126; Referee: John McCloskey

November 24, 2019	No. 14 UC Davis	0–1	Louisville	Davis, California
4:00 p.m. EDT			Jennings 62'	Stadium: Aggie Soccer Field; Attendance: 1,703; Referee: Israel Fernandez

November 24, 2019	No. 12 Saint Mary's (CA)	0–4	UC Santa Barbara	Moraga, California
4:00 p.m. EDT		Report	Billingsley 32'; Baynham 65'; Michael 70', 80'	Stadium: Saint Mary's Stadium; Attendance: 1,556

November 24, 2019	No. 10 Virginia Tech	4–1	New Hampshire	Blacksburg, Virginia
4:00 p.m. EDT	Strickler 17', 35'; Kasak 37'; Lennon 73'	Report	Gould 16'	Stadium: Sandra D. Thompson Field; Attendance: 420; Referee: Kevin Broadley

November 24, 2019	No. 15 Penn State	2–3 (a.e.t.)	Providence	State College, Pennsylvania
5:00 p.m. EDT	Molloy 50'; May 54'	Report	Wolf 55'; Mendonca 86'; Davock 95'	Stadium: Jeffrey Field; Attendance: 290; Referee: Brian Miller

November 24, 2019	No. 16 St. John's	2–1	Syracuse	New York, New York
5:00 p.m. EDT	Knapp 19'; Simonsen 36'	Report	Ferrin 69'	Stadium: Belson Stadium; Attendance: 457; Referee: Carlos Fernandes

November 24, 2019	No. 4 Wake Forest	3–0	Maryland	Winston-Salem, North Carolina
5:00 p.m. EDT	Lapa 26'; Chol 50'; Holcomb 89'	Report		Stadium: Spry Stadium; Attendance: 1,765; Referee: Mike Stutt

November 24, 2019	No. 2 Clemson	2–1 (a.e.t.)	Charlotte	Clemson, South Carolina
6:00 p.m. EDT	Robinson 56'; Barber (94)	Report	Popp 73'	Stadium: Historic Riggs Field; Attendance: 1,472; Referee: Robert Sibiga

November 24, 2019	No. 9 UCF	2–1 (a.e.t.)	Missouri State	Orlando, Florida
6:00 p.m. EDT	Sorokin 28'; Jennings (91)	Report	Bruseth 4'	Stadium: UCF Soccer and Track Stadium; Attendance: 857; Referee: Rubiel Vazquez

November 24, 2019	No. 6 Washington	2–0	Boston College	Seattle, Washington
8:00 p.m. EDT	Bodily 25'; Townsend 31'	Report		Stadium: Husky Soccer Stadium; Attendance: 1,221; Referee: Andrew Marihart

November 24, 2019	No. 8 SMU	1–0 (a.e.t.)	Coastal Carolina	Dallas, Texas
8:00 p.m. EDT	McLaughlin 108'	Report		Stadium: Westcott Field; Attendance: 1,150; Referee: Seth Barton

November 24, 2019	No. 7 Stanford	1–1 (a.e.t.) (2–1 p)	Seattle U	Stanford, California
8:00 p.m. EDT	Beason 61'	Report	Meza 75'	Stadium: Laird Q. Cagan Stadium; Attendance: 1,047; Referee: Bernhard Hosu
	Penalties
	Panchot (penalty scored); Bulut (penalty missed); Beason (penalty scored); Bouda (penalty missed)		(penalty missed) Morris; (penalty scored) Uderitz; (penalty missed) Meza; (penalty missed) Ortiz; (penalty missed) Ritchie

=== Third round ===
November 30, 2019	No. 1 Virginia	3–0	No. 16 St. John's	Charlottesville, Virginia
7:00 p.m. EDT	Ueland 3', 15'; Bell 36'	Report		Stadium: Klöckner Stadium; Attendance: 815; Referee: Andrew Charron

November 30, 2019	No. 8 SMU	2–1 (a.e.t.)	No. 9 UCF	Dallas, Texas
8:30 p.m. EDT	Costa 36' (pen.); Munjoma 91'	Report	Jennings 25'	Stadium: Westcott Field; Attendance: 979

December 1, 2019	No. 3 Georgetown	5–1	Louisville	Washington, D.C.
12:00 p.m. EDT	Montes 2', 82'; Beer 26'; Rothrock 50', 82'	Report	Fonseca 29'	Stadium: Shaw Field; Attendance: 773

December 1, 2019	No. 5 Indiana	0–1 (a.e.t.)	UC Santa Barbara	Bloomington, Indiana
12:00 p.m. EDT		preview	Baynham 102'	Stadium: Bill Armstrong Stadium; Attendance: 712

December 1, 2019	No. 4 Wake Forest	3–1	No. 13 Michigan	Winston-Salem, North Carolina
5:00 p.m. EDT	Holcomb 50', 84'; Lapa 70'	preview	Broche 77'	Stadium: Spry Stadium; Attendance: 1,206

December 1, 2019	No. 2 Clemson	2–1 (a.e.t.)	Providence	Clemson, South Carolina
6:00 p.m. EDT	Robinson 9', 105' (pen.)	preview	Mendonca 45'	Stadium: Historic Riggs Field; Attendance: 1,469

December 1, 2019	No. 7 Stanford	2–1	No. 10 Virginia Tech	Stanford, California
8:00 p.m. EDT	Waldeck 54'; Hughes 80'	preview	Lennon 68'	Stadium: Stanford Stadium; Attendance: 664

December 1, 2019	No. 6 Washington	4–1	No. 11 Marshall	Seattle, Washington
8:00 p.m. EDT	Bodily 8'; Bartlow 43', 73' (pen.); Miglietti 46'	preview	Roberts 24'	Stadium: Husky Soccer Stadium; Attendance: 1,530

=== Quarterfinals ===
December 6, 2019	No. 2 Clemson	1–1 (a.e.t.) (4–5 p)	No. 7 Stanford	Clemson, South Carolina
6:00 p.m. EDT	Seye 75'	Report	Beason 35'	Stadium: Historic Riggs Field; Attendance: 3,267; Referee: Chris Penso
	Penalties
	Mbaye (penalty scored); Robinson (penalty missed); Nunez (penalty scored); Brighton (penalty scored); Agren (penalty scored); Fernandez (penalty missed)		(penalty scored) Waldeck; (penalty scored) Bulut; (penalty scored) Beason; (penalty missed) Bouda; (penalty scored) Panchot; (penalty scored) Joshua

December 6, 2019	No. 1 Virginia	3–2 (a.e.t.)	No. 8 SMU	Charlottesville, Virginia
7:00 p.m. EDT	Gunnarsson 18'; Bell 78' (pen.), 95'	Report	Costa 71' (pen.); Bredeli 84'	Stadium: Klöckner Stadium; Attendance: 1,674; Referee: Mark Kadelcik

December 7, 2019	No. 3 Georgetown	2–1	No. 6 Washington	Washington, D.C.
12:00 p.m. EDT	Montes 72'; Dodson 76'	Report	Townsend 4'	Stadium: Shaw Field; Attendance: 2,093; Referee: Eric Tattersall

December 7, 2019	No. 4 Wake Forest	1–0	UC Santa Barbara	Winston-Salem, North Carolina
5:00 p.m. EDT	Johnston 44'	Report		Stadium: Spry Stadium; Attendance: 2,027; Referee: Robert Sibiga

=== Semifinals ===
December 13, 2019	No. 3 Georgetown	2–0	No. 7 Stanford	Cary, North Carolina
6:00 p.m. EST	Zawadzki 4'; McCune 67'	Report		Stadium: WakeMed Soccer Park; Attendance: 9,862; Referee: Mike Stutt

December 13, 2019	No. 1 Virginia	2–1	No. 4 Wake Forest	Cary, North Carolina
8:30 p.m. EST	Dike 19', 23'	Report	Lapa 79' (pen.)	Stadium: WakeMed Soccer Park; Attendance: 9,862; Referee: Sorin Stoica

=== Final ===
December 15, 2019	No. 1 Virginia	3–3 (a.e.t.) (6–7 p)	No. 3 Georgetown	Cary, North Carolina
6:00 p.m. EST	Bell 10'; Steedman 58'; Dike 86'	Report	Rothrock 16'; Wu 22'; Dodson 81'	Stadium: WakeMed Soccer Park; Attendance: 8,413; Referee: Rubiel Vazquez
	Penalties
	Bell (penalty scored); Steedman (penalty scored); Donasiyano (penalty scored); Ueland (penalty scored); Crofts (penalty scored); Halsey (penalty scored); Gunnarsson (penalty missed)		(penalty scored) O'Hearn; (penalty scored) Riviere; (penalty scored) Beer; (penalty scored) Polvara; (penalty scored) Fischer; (penalty scored) Wu; (penalty scored) Rocha

== Statistics ==
=== Goalscorers ===
4 Goals

- (New Zealand) Joe Bell — Virginia

3 Goals

- (Australia) Will Baynham — UC Santa Barbara
- (United States) Victor Bezerra — Indiana
- (United States) Daryl Dike — Virginia
- (United States) Derek Dodson — Georgetown
- (United States) Kyle Holcomb — Wake Forest
- (Brazil) Bruno Lapa — Wake Forest
- (Sierra Leone) Rodney Michael — UC Santa Barbara
- (Nicaragua) Jacob Montes — Georgetown
- (United States) Robbie Robinson — Clemson
- (United States) Paul Rothrock — Georgetown

2 Goals

- (United States) Ethan Bartlow — Washington
- (United States) Tanner Beason — Stanford
- (United States) Blake Bodily — Washington
- (Brazil) Gabriel Costa — SMU
- (United States) Trevor Davock — Providence
- (United States) Josh DiMatteo — West Virginia
- (Brazil) Pedro Fonseca — Louisville
- (United States) Cal Jennings — UCF
- (United States) Izaiah Jennings — Louisville
- (United States) Camron Lennon — Virginia Tech
- (United States) David Loera — NC State
- (United States) Foster McCune — Georgetown
- (Portugal) Tiago Mendonca — Providence
- (United States) Dylan Nealis — Georgetown
- (Canada) Ryan Raposo — Syracuse
- (England) Jamil Roberts — Marshall
- (Spain) Rodrigo Robles Grajera — West Virginia
- (United States) Kristo Strickler — Virginia Tech
- (United States) Jaret Townsend — Washington
- (Norway) Andreas Ueland — Virginia
- (Denmark) Esben Wolf — Providence

1 Goal

- (Guadeloupe) Luther Archimède — Syracuse
- (United States) Grayson Barber — Clemson
- (United States) Zion Beaton — Wright State
- (United States) Jack Beer — Georgetown
- (England) Matthew Bentley — Missouri State
- (New Zealand) Noah Billingsley — UC Santa Barbara
- (Iceland) Eythor Bjorgolfsson — Kentucky
- (Norway) Henrik Bredeli — SMU
- (United States) Derick Broche — Michigan
- (England) Luke Brown — Maryland
- (Norway) Aadne Bruseth — Missouri State
- (France) Thibault Candia — UC Santa Barbara
- (Sudan) Machop Chol — Wake Forest
- (England) Deri Corfe — Wright State
- (England) Nathaniel Crofts — Virginia
- (Senegal) Cherif Dieye — Louisville
- (France) Bissafi Dotte — Campbell
- (Canada) Massimo Ferrin — Syracuse
- (United States) Justin Gielen — Maryland
- (El Salvador) Christian Gómez — California
- (United States) Jacob Gould — New Hampshire
- (Sweden) Axel Gunnarsson — Virginia
- (United States) Joshua Harrison — Mercer
- (United States) Patrick Hogan — Charlotte
- (United States) Keegan Hughes — Stanford
- (United States) Alex Hummel — Wright State
- (France) Thibaut Jacquel — Campbell
- (New Zealand) Luke Johnson — Charlotte
- (Canada) Alistair Johnston — Wake Forest
- (Canada) Malcolm Johnston — Maryland
- (England) Bilal Kamal — New Hampshire
- (United States) James Kasak — Virginia Tech
- (Uganda) Edward Kizza — Pittsburgh
- (United States) Brandon Knapp — St. John's
- (Israel) Noam Kolakofsky — Rhode Island
- (Iceland) Kristofer Konradsson — Boston College
- (United States) Harrison Kurtz — Seattle
- (England) Matt Lock — Campbell
- (United States) Lewis Long IV — James Madison
- (United States) Logan Lucas — West Virginia
- (United States) Jack Lynn — Notre Dame
- (United States) Eric Matzelevich — Maryland
- (United States) Kyle May — Penn State
- (United States) Garrett McLaughlin — SMU
- (United States) Noe Meza — Seattle
- (United States) Gio Miglietti — Washington
- (United States) Andrew Mitchell — Loyola Chicago
- (Republic of Ireland) Aaron Molloy — Penn State
- (South Africa) Tyrone Mondi — Coastal Carolina
- (Costa Rica) Josue Monge — South Florida
- (United States) Eddie Munjoma — SMU
- (Spain) Andres Muriel Albino — West Virginia
- (England) Rhys Myers — Butler
- (United States) Connor Noblat — Seattle
- (United States) Jessie Ortiz — Seattle
- (United States) Spencer Patton — Virginia
- (United States) Chance Pellerin — Charlotte
- (Canada) Preston Popp — Charlotte
- (United States) John Rea — Notre Dame
- (Costa Rica) Jason Reyes — Kentucky
- (France) Emile Rzepecki — Coastal Carolina
- (United States) Bradley Sample — Louisville
- (Spain) Mohamed Seye — Clemson
- (Iceland) Stefan Sigurdarson — Boston College
- (Norway) Skage Simonsen — St. John's
- (Denmark) Kasper Skraep — Coastal Carolina
- (Israel) Yoni Sorokin — UCF
- (Scotland) Daniel Steedman — Virginia
- (United States) Mike Suski — Boston College
- (Italy) Filippo Tamburini — Rhode Island
- (United States) Derek Waldeck — Stanford
- (United States) Bryce Washington — Pittsburgh
- (Jamaica) Duhaney Williams — Loyola Marymount
- (United States) Daniel Wu — Georgetown
- (Germany) Milo Yosef — Marshall
- (United States) Sean Zawadzki — Georgetown

=== Own goals ===
1 Own Goal

- (United States) Nyk Sessock — Pittsburgh (playing against Georgetown)

== Record by Conference ==
Conference	Bids	Record	Pct.	R32	R16	QF	SF	F	NC
ACC	10	15–10–0	0.600	8	5	3	2	1	–
Big Ten	4	3–4–0	0.429	4	2	–	–	–	–
Big East	4	8–3–0	0.727	3	3	1	1	1	1
C-USA	3	3–3–0	0.500	3	1	–	–	–	–
The American	3	3–3–0	0.500	2	2	1	–	–	–
Pac-12	3	5–3–0	0.625	2	2	2	1	–	–
MVC	2	1–2–0	0.333	1	–	–	–	–	–
WCC	2	0–2–0	0.000	1	–	–	–	–	–
Big West	2	3–2–0	0.600	2	1	1	–	–	–
America East	1	1–1–0	0.500	1	–	–	–	–	–
Atlantic 10	1	0–1–0	0.000	–	–	–	–	–	–
Atlantic Sun	1	0–1–0	0.000	–	–	–	–	–	–
Big South	1	1–1–0	0.500	1	–	–	–	–	–
CAA	1	0–1–0	0.000	–	–	–	–	–	–
Horizon League	1	1–1–0	0.500	1	–	–	–	–	–
Ivy League	1	0–1–0	0.000	–	–	–	–	–	–
MAC	1	1–1–0	0.500	1	–	–	–	–	–
MAAC	1	0–1–0	0.000	–	–	–	–	–	–
NEC	1	0–1–0	0.000	–	–	–	–	–	–
Patriot League	1	0–1–0	0.000	–	–	–	–	–	–
SoCon	1	0–1–0	0.000	–	–	–	–	–	–
Summit League	1	0–1–0	0.000	–	–	–	–	–	–
Sun Belt	1	1–1–0	0.500	1	–	–	–	–	–
WAC	1	1–1–0	0.500	1	–	–	–	–	–

- The R32, S16, E8, F4, CG, and NC columns indicate how many teams from each conference were in the Round of 32 (second round), Round of 16 (third round), quarterfinals, semifinals, Final, and National Champion, respectively.

== See also ==
- 2019 NCAA Division I Women's Soccer Tournament
- 2019 NCAA Division I men's soccer season
