= 2019 Loyola Marymount Lions men's soccer team =

American college soccer season

2019 Loyola Marymount Lions men's soccer

West Coast Conference Runner-ups

NCAA Tournament, First Round
- Conference: West Coast Conference
- Record: 11–6–3 (6–1–0 WCC)
- Head coach: Paul Krumpe (22nd season)
- Assistant coaches: Kyle Schmid (2nd season); Mike Oseguera (6th season)
- Home stadium: Sullivan Field

2019 West Coast Conference men's soccer standings
	Conf.					Overall
Team	W		L		T	W		L		T
No. 15 Saint Mary's †	7	–	0	–	0	16	–	2	–	0
Loyola Marymount +	6	–	1	–	0	11	–	6	–	3
Gonzaga	3	–	3	–	1	4	–	10	–	3
San Diego	3	–	4	–	0	12	–	5	–	1
Portland	3	–	4	–	0	9	–	7	–	1
Santa Clara	2	–	4	–	1	8	–	7	–	2
Pacific	2	–	4	–	0	5	–	10	–	1
San Francisco	0	–	6	–	0	2	–	13	–	1
† – Conference champion + – Invited to the 2019 NCAA tournament; As of 17 December 2019; Rankings from United Soccer Coaches

The 2019 Loyola Marymount Lions men's soccer team represented Loyola Marymount University during the 2019 NCAA Division I men's soccer season and the 2019 West Coast Conference men's soccer season. The regular season began on August 30 and concluded on November 16. It was the program's 41st season fielding a men's varsity soccer team, and their 32nd season in the West Coast Conference. The 2019 season was Paul Krumpe's twenty-second year as head coach for the program.

== Roster ==
As of December 12, 2019

Note: Flags indicate national team as defined under FIFA eligibility rules; some limited exceptions apply. Players may hold more than one non-FIFA nationality.

No.	Pos.	Nation	Player
0	GK	(United States) USA	Mitchell Wilson
1	GK	(United States) USA	Alfredo Cortez
2	DF	(United States) USA	Dylan Shockey
3	DF	(United States) USA	Tim Burke
4	DF	(United States) USA	Nick Dauchot
5	DF	(United States) USA	Gerardo Lopez
6	DF	(United States) USA	Danny Garcia
7	FW	(Jamaica) JAM	Duhaney Williams
8	MF	(United States) USA	Will Dubay
9	FW	(United States) USA	Francis Avoce
10	MF	(United States) USA	Brandon Sanchez
11	MF	(United States) USA	CJ Neville
12	MF	(France) FRA	Gaetan Roux
13	FW	(United States) USA	Owen Gortner
14	MF	(United States) USA	Rodrigo San Roman
15	MF	(United States) USA	Alex Liu

No.	Pos.	Nation	Player
16	MF	(Italy) ITA	Leo Zulli
17	FW	(United States) USA	Jack Sauls
18	FW	(United States) USA	Wils Martin
19	FW	(United States) USA	Nick Giacalone
21	DF	(United States) USA	Corbin Mercado
22	MF	(Switzerland) SUI	Bastien Oberli
23	DF	(United States) USA	Christian Wood
24	MF	(United States) USA	Derek Goodman
25	MF	(United States) USA	Dominick Paielli
26	DF	(United States) USA	Cesar Oliva
29	MF	(Germany) GER	Noel Caliskan
31	GK	(United States) USA	Cooper Erickson
32	DF	(United States) USA	Alec Bakkeby
34	MF	(United States) USA	Narciso Cervantes
43	MF	(United States) USA	Nathan Franco
98	GK	(United States) USA	Jacob Jackson

== Schedule ==
Date Time, TV	Rank^{#}	Opponent^{#}	Result	Record	Site (Attendance) City, State
Non-conference regular season
August 30*; 7:00 p.m.		No. 16 Virginia Tech	L 1–2	0–1–0	Sullivan Field; Los Angeles, CA
September 6*; 7:00 p.m.		Oral Roberts	W 2–0	1–1–0	Sullivan Field; Los Angeles, CA
September 8*; 1:00 p.m.		Loyola (IL)	W 1–0	2–1–0	Sullivan Field (289); Los Angeles, CA
September 13*; 7:00 p.m.		Sacramento State	W 3–0	3–1–0	Sullivan Field (286); Los Angeles, CA
September 15*; 3:00 p.m.		UC Davis	W 1–0	4–1–0	Sullivan Field (316); Los Angeles, CA
September 19*; 7:00 p.m.		at UC Riverside	T 0–0 ^{2OT}	4–1–1	UC Riverside Soccer Stadium; Riverside, CA
September 22*; 6:00 p.m.		at No. 23 Cal State Northridge	W 2–0	5–1–1	Matador Soccer Field (412); Northridge, CA
September 26*; 7:00 p.m.	No. 24	at Cal Poly	L 1–2 ^{OT}	5–2–1	Alex G. Spanos Stadium (1,093); San Luis Obispo, CA
September 29*; 5:00 p.m.	No. 24	at No. 13 Cal State Fullerton	T 1–1 ^{2OT}	5–2–2	Titan Stadium (725); Fullerton, CA
October 3*; 7:00 p.m.		UC Irvine	T 3–3 ^{2OT}	5–2–3	Sullivan Field (325); Los Angeles, CA
October 6*; 10:00 a.m.		at Western Michigan	L 0–1	5–3–3	WMU Soccer Complex (537); Kalamazoo, MI
West Coast Conference regular season
October 12; 7:00 p.m.		Gonzaga	W 1–0 ^{OT}	6–3–3 (1–0–0)	Sullivan Field (313); Los Angeles, CA
October 15*; 7:00 p.m.		No. 21 Marshall	L 1–4	6–4–3	Sullivan Field (185); Los Angeles, CA
October 19; 7:00 p.m.		Portland	W 2–1 ^{2OT}	7–4–3 (2–0–0)	Sullivan Field (410); Los Angeles, CA
October 26; 7:00 p.m.		at Pacific	W 2–1 ^{OT}	8–4–3 (3–0–0)	Knoles Field (253); Stockton, CA
October 30; 7:00 p.m.		at No. 23 San Diego	W 3–1	9–4–3 (4–0–0)	Torero Stadium; San Diego, CA
November 2; 7:00 p.m.		Santa Clara	W 2–0	10–4–3 (5–0–0)	Sullivan Field (560); Los Angeles, CA
November 9; 1:00 p.m.		at No. 12 Saint Mary's	L 0–2	10–5–3 (5–1–0)	Saint Mary's Stadium (611); Moraga, CA
November 16; 7:00 p.m.		at San Francisco	W 2–0	11–5–3 (6–1–0)	Negoesco Stadium; San Francisco, CA
NCAA Tournament
November 21; 7:00 p.m.		No. 20 Seattle; First Round	L 1–3	11–6–3	Sullivan Field (940); Los Angeles, CA
*Non-conference game. ^{#}Rankings from United Soccer Coaches. (#) Tournament seedings in parentheses. All times are in Pacific Time.
