= 2019 UC Santa Barbara Gauchos men's soccer team =

American college soccer season

2019 UC Santa Barbara Gauchos men's soccer

NCAA Tournament, Quarterfinals
- Conference: Big West Conference
- U. Soc. Coaches poll: No. 22
- TopDrawerSoccer.com: No. 5
- Record: 15–4–4 (4–1–2 Big West)
- Head coach: Tim Vom Steeg (21st season)
- Assistant coaches: Greg Wilson (14th season); Greg Curry (9th season)
- Home stadium: Harder Stadium

2019 Big West Conference men's soccer standings
	Conf.					Overall
Team	W		L		T	W		L		T
No. 25 UC Davis ‡	5	–	1	–	1	12	–	5	–	2
No. 8 UC Santa Barbara+	4	–	1	–	2	15	–	4	–	4
UC Irvine	4	–	2	–	1	7	–	7	–	5
Cal State Fullerton	3	–	4	–	0	12	–	7	–	1
Cal Poly	3	–	4	–	0	7	–	9	–	1
Cal State Northridge	2	–	3	–	2	8	–	9	–	3
Sacramento State	2	–	4	–	1	7	–	9	–	2
UC Riverside	1	–	5	–	1	6	–	9	–	3
‡ – 2019 Big West Tournament champion + – Invited to the 2019 NCAA tournament; As of 17 December 2019; Rankings from United Soccer Coaches

The 2019 UC Santa Barbara Gauchos men's soccer team represented University of California, Santa Barbara during the 2019 NCAA Division I men's soccer season and the 2019 Big West Conference men's soccer season. The regular season began on August 30 and concluded on November 2. It was the program's 54th season fielding a men's varsity soccer team, and their 28th season in the Big West. The 2019 season was Tim Vom Steeg's twenty-first year as head coach for the program.

== Roster ==
As of December 2, 2019

Note: Flags indicate national team as defined under FIFA eligibility rules; some limited exceptions apply. Players may hold more than one non-FIFA nationality.

No.	Pos.	Nation	Player
0	GK	SLV	Alan Carrillo
1	GK	USA	Ben Roach
2	DF	USA	Kavian Kashani
3	DF	NZL	Hunter Ashworth
5	DF	FRA	Faouzi Taieb
6	DF	NZL	William Gillingham
7	DF	NZL	Noah Billingsley
8	MF	USA	Kaya Fabbretti
9	FW	ESP	Ignacio Tellechea
10	FW	SLE	Rodney Michael
11	MF	SLE	Sahid Conteh
12	MF	USA	Carson Vom Steeg
13	MF	AUS	Finn Ballard McBride
14	DF	CAN	Mateo Restrepo Mejia
15	DF	USA	Giovanny Acosta
16	FW	GHA	Ameyawu Muntari
17	FW	MEX	Derek Kryzda

No.	Pos.	Nation	Player
18	DF	USA	Ryan Johnson
19	DF	USA	Jesse Fitzgerald
20	FW	CAN	Will Baynham
23	MF	USA	Luka Zivkovic
24	DF	USA	Justin Ali
25	DF	USA	Omari Fontes
26	DF	USA	Tristan Miller
27	FW	USA	Carter Clemmensen
28	FW	USA	Oscar Ferreira
29	GK	USA	Kyle Rudd
30	MF	USA	Sam Fletcher
31	DF	USA	Lucas Gonzalez
32	MF	USA	Zade Ghani
33	FW	USA	John Kim
40	GK	USA	Colin Coppola Sneddon
85	MF	FRA	Thibault Candia

== Schedule ==
Date Time, TV	Rank^{#}	Opponent^{#}	Result	Record	Site (Attendance) City, State
Non-conference regular season
August 30*; 7:30 p.m.		UNLV	W 2–1 ^{2OT}	1–0–0	Harder Stadium (1,416); Santa Barbara, CA
September 1*; 7:00 p.m.		No. 16 Virginia Tech	L 1–3	1–1–0	Harder Stadium (1,500); Santa Barbara, CA
September 7*; 7:00 p.m.		California	L 0–3	1–2–0	Harder Stadium (1,512); Santa Barbara, CA
September 12*; 7:00 p.m.		at Gonzaga	W 1–0	2–2–0	Luger Field (436); Spokane, WA
September 15*; 7:00 p.m.		at Oregon State	W 3–2	3–2–0	Paul Lorenz Field (358); Corvallis, OR
September 19*; 7:00 p.m.		Seattle	W 1–0	4–2–0	Harder Stadium (1,000); Santa Barbara, CA
September 22*; 7:00 p.m.		UMBC	W 4–0	5–2–0	Harder Stadium (1,843); Santa Barbara, CA
September 25*; 7:00 p.m.		at Pacific	W 2–0	6–2–0	Knoles Field (419); Stockton, CA
September 28*; 7:00 p.m.		No. 1 Stanford	T 3–3 ^{2OT}	6–2–1	Harder Stadium (3,812); Santa Barbara, CA
October 1*; 7:00 p.m.		at No. 25 San Diego	T 2–2 ^{2OT}	6–2–2	Torero Stadium (446); San Diego, CA
October 5; 7:00 p.m.		Cal Poly; Blue–Green Rivalry	W 3–1	7–2–2	Harder Stadium (9,748); Santa Barbara, CA
Big West Conference regular season
October 9; 7:00 p.m.		Sacramento State	W 2–0	8–2–2 (1–0–0)	Harder Stadium (1,000); Santa Barbara, CA
October 12; 7:00 p.m.		at No. 24 Cal State Fullerton	W 5–0	9–2–2 (2–0–0)	Titan Stadium (952); Fullerton, CA
October 16; 7:00 p.m.	No. 17	UC Riverside	W 2–0	10–2–2 (3–0–0)	Harder Stadium (1,013); Santa Barbara, CA
October 19; 7:00 p.m.	No. 17	UC Irvine	L 1–2 ^{OT}	10–3–2 (3–1–0)	Harder Stadium (1,534); Santa Barbara, CA
October 23; 3:00 p.m.	No. 20	at UC Davis	T 1–1 ^{2OT}	10–3–3 (3–1–1)	Aggie Soccer Field (587); Davis, CA
October 26; 7:00 p.m.	No. 20	at Cal State Northridge	T 0–0 ^{2OT}	10–3–4 (3–1–2)	Matador Soccer Field (392); Northridge, CA
November 2; 5:00 p.m.	No. 19	at Cal Poly; Blue–Green Rivalry	W 2–0	11–3–4 (4–1–2)	Alex G. Spanos Stadium (11,075); San Luis Obispo, CA
Big West Conference Tournament
November 9; 7:00 p.m.	(2) No. 15	(6) Cal State Northridge; Semifinals	W 2–0	12–3–4	Harder Stadium (1,126); Santa Barbara, CA
November 15; 2:00 p.m.	(2) No. 16	at (1) No. 24 UC Davis; Championship Game	L 0–2	12–4–4	Aggie Soccer Field (1,308); Davis, CA
NCAA Tournament
November 21; 7:00 p.m.	No. 22	California; First Round	W 3–1	13–4–4	Harder Stadium (1,256); Santa Barbara, CA
November 24; 1:00 p.m.	No. 22	at (12) No. 10 Saint Mary's; Second Round	W 4–0	14–4–4	Saint Mary's Stadium (1,556); Moraga, CA
December 1; 1:00 p.m.	No. 22	at (5) No. 6 Indiana; Third Round	W 1–0 ^{2OT}	15–4–4	Bill Armstrong Stadium (712); Bloomington, IN
December 7; 1:00 p.m.	No. 22	at (4) No. 9 Wake Forest; Quarterfinals	L 0–1	15–5–4	Spry Stadium (2,027); Winston-Salem, NC
*Non-conference game. ^{#}Rankings from United Soccer Coaches. (#) Tournament seedings in parentheses. All times are in Pacific Time.
