= 2019 Saint Mary's Gaels men's soccer team =

American college soccer season

2019 Saint Mary's Gaels men's soccer

West Coast Conference Champions

NCAA Tournament, Second Round
- Conference: West Coast Conference
- U. Soc. Coaches poll: No. 10
- TopDrawerSoccer.com: No. 22
- Record: 16–2–0 (7–0–0 WCC)
- Head coach: Adam Cooper (14th season)
- Assistant coaches: Chris Brown (7th season); Baggio Hušidić (1st season)
- Home stadium: Saint Mary's Stadium

2019 West Coast Conference men's soccer standings
	Conf.					Overall
Team	W		L		T	W		L		T
No. 15 Saint Mary's †	7	–	0	–	0	16	–	2	–	0
Loyola Marymount +	6	–	1	–	0	11	–	6	–	3
Gonzaga	3	–	3	–	1	4	–	10	–	3
San Diego	3	–	4	–	0	12	–	5	–	1
Portland	3	–	4	–	0	9	–	7	–	1
Santa Clara	2	–	4	–	1	8	–	7	–	2
Pacific	2	–	4	–	0	5	–	10	–	1
San Francisco	0	–	6	–	0	2	–	13	–	1
† – Conference champion + – Invited to the 2019 NCAA tournament; As of 17 December 2019; Rankings from United Soccer Coaches

The 2019 Saint Mary's Gaels men's soccer team represented Saint Mary's College of California during the 2019 NCAA Division I men's soccer season and the 2019 West Coast Conference men's soccer season. The regular season began on August 30 and concluded on November 16. It was the program's 42nd season fielding a men's varsity soccer team, and their 32nd season in the West Coast Conference. The 2019 season was Adam Cooper's fourteenth year as head coach for the program.

== Roster ==
As of December 9, 2019

Note: Flags indicate national team as defined under FIFA eligibility rules; some limited exceptions apply. Players may hold more than one non-FIFA nationality.

No.	Pos.	Nation	Player
0	GK	(United States) USA	Nicholas Lapinid
1	GK	(United States) USA	Remi Prieur
2	DF	(United States) USA	Erik Lyons
3	DF	(Italy) ITA	Filippo Zattarin
4	DF	(Germany) GER	Valentin Sponer
5	DF	(United States) USA	Jeremiah Michael
6	MF	(United States) USA	Jack Mortensen
7	MF	(Netherlands) NED	Phillipe Van der Lof
9	FW	(United States) USA	Joseph Restani
10	MF	(Czech Republic) CZE	Jakub Svehlik
11	FW	(Norway) NOR	Anders Engebretsen
12	FW	(United States) USA	Lucas Andrews
13	FW	(Germany) GER	Valentin Kurz

No.	Pos.	Nation	Player
14	MF	(United States) USA	David Brog
15	FW	(United States) USA	Jake Rudel
16	DF	(United States) USA	James Person
17	FW	(United States) USA	Younes Dayekh
18	DF	(New Zealand) NZL	Boyd Curry
19	FW	(United States) USA	Greg Brighton
20	MF	(United States) USA	Paul Ramsey
21	DF	(Portugal) POR	Miguel Bowden
22	MF	(United States) USA	Maxwell Kleeman
23	MF	(New Zealand) NZL	Sebastian Schacht
24	MF	(United States) USA	Josh Thompson
25	MF	(South Africa) RSA	Chris Athanasiadis
30	GK	(United States) USA	Zack Littman

== Schedule ==
Date Time, TV	Rank^{#}	Opponent^{#}	Result	Record	Site (Attendance) City, State
Non-conference regular season
August 30*; 4:00 p.m.	No. 11	No. 25 UC Irvine	W 2–0	1–0–0	Saint Mary's Stadium (579); Moraga, CA
September 2*; 12:00 p.m.	No. 11	Omaha	W 4–0	2–0–0	Saint Mary's Stadium (515); Moraga, CA
September 6*; 4:30 p.m.	No. 8	Grand Canyon	W 1–0	3–0–0	Saint Mary's Stadium (460); Moraga, CA
September 9*; 7:00 p.m.	No. 8	at San Jose State	W 5–2	4–0–0	Spartan Soccer Field (537); San Jose, CA
September 13*; 7:00 p.m.	No. 7	at Cal State Bakersfield	W 3–2 ^{OT}	5–0–0	Main Soccer Field; Bakersfield, CA
September 19*; 5:30 p.m.	No. 6	at UNLV; Johann Memorial Classic	W 2–0	6–0–0	Peter F. Johann Memorial Soccer Field; Paradise, NV
September 22*; 12:00 p.m.	No. 6	vs. Utah Valley; Johann Memorial Classic	W 2–1	7–0–0	Peter F. Johann Memorial Soccer Field; Paradise, NV
September 26*; 4:00 p.m.	No. 6	UC Davis	L 2–4	7–1–0	Saint Mary's Stadium (435); Moraga, CA
September 29*; 1:00 p.m.	No. 6	Sacramento State	W 4–0	8–1–0	Saint Mary's Stadium (495); Moraga, CA
October 5*; 5:00 p.m.	No. 10	at Northern Illinois	W 5–0	9–1–0	NIU Soccer and Track & Field Complex (129); DeKalb, IL
West Coast Conference regular season
October 12; 7:00 p.m.	No. 8	at Santa Clara	W 2–1	10–1–0 (1–0–0)	Stevens Stadium (1,514); Santa Clara, CA
October 20; 1:00 p.m.	No. 9	No. 16 San Diego	W 3–0	11–1–0 (2–0–0)	Saint Mary's Stadium (644); Moraga, CA
October 26; 7:00 p.m.	No. 13	at San Francisco	W 1–0	12–1–0 (3–0–0)	Negoesco Stadium (652); San Francisco, CA
October 30; 3:00 p.m.	No. 11	Pacific	W 1–0	13–1–0 (4–0–0)	Saint Mary's Stadium (138); Moraga, CA
November 2; 7:00 p.m.	No. 11	at Gonzaga	W 3–0	14–1–0 (5–0–0)	Luger Field; Spokane, WA
November 9; 1:00 p.m.	No. 12	Loyola Marymount	W 2–0	15–1–0 (6–0–0)	Saint Mary's Stadium (611); Moraga, CA
November 16; 1:00 p.m.	No. 11	Portland	W 5–1	16–1–0 (7–0–0)	Saint Mary's Stadium (705); Moraga, CA
NCAA Tournament
November 24; 1:00 p.m.	(12) No. 10	No. 22 UC Santa Barbara; Second Round	L 0–4	16–2–0	Saint Mary's Stadium (1,556); Moraga, CA
*Non-conference game. ^{#}Rankings from United Soccer Coaches. (#) Tournament seedings in parentheses. All times are in Pacific Time.
