= Aggie Soccer Stadium =

Aggie Soccer Stadium may refer to one of two stadiums in the US:

- Aggie Soccer Stadium (UC Davis), commonly called Aggie Field, University of California, Davis (Davis, California)
- Aggie Soccer Stadium (Texas A&M), now known as Ellis Field, at Texas A&M University (College Station, Texas)
