= 2019 UC Davis Aggies men's soccer team =

American college soccer season

2019 UC Davis Aggies men's soccer

Big West Regular Season Champions Big West Tournament Champions

NCAA Tournament, Second Round
- Conference: Big West Conference
- U. Soc. Coaches poll: No. 18
- TopDrawerSoccer.com: No. 21
- Record: 13–5–2 (5–1–1 Big West)
- Head coach: Dwayne Shaffer (23rd season)
- Assistant coaches: Jason Hotaling (15th season); Justin Wright (1st season)
- Home stadium: Aggie Soccer Field

2019 Big West Conference men's soccer standings
	Conf.					Overall
Team	W		L		T	W		L		T
No. 25 UC Davis ‡	5	–	1	–	1	12	–	5	–	2
No. 8 UC Santa Barbara+	4	–	1	–	2	15	–	4	–	4
UC Irvine	4	–	2	–	1	7	–	7	–	5
Cal State Fullerton	3	–	4	–	0	12	–	7	–	1
Cal Poly	3	–	4	–	0	7	–	9	–	1
Cal State Northridge	2	–	3	–	2	8	–	9	–	3
Sacramento State	2	–	4	–	1	7	–	9	–	2
UC Riverside	1	–	5	–	1	6	–	9	–	3
‡ – 2019 Big West Tournament champion + – Invited to the 2019 NCAA tournament; As of 17 December 2019; Rankings from United Soccer Coaches

The 2019 UC Davis Aggies men's soccer team represented University of California, Davis during the 2019 NCAA Division I men's soccer season and the 2019 Big West Conference men's soccer season. The regular season began on August 30 and concluded on November 2. It was the program's 16th season fielding a Division I men's varsity soccer team, and their 13th season in the Big West. The 2019 season was Dwayne Shaffer's twenty-third year as head coach for the program.

== Roster ==
As of December 5, 2019

Note: Flags indicate national team as defined under FIFA eligibility rules; some limited exceptions apply. Players may hold more than one non-FIFA nationality.

No.	Pos.	Nation	Player
0	GK	(United States) USA	Derrek Chan
1	GK	(United States) USA	Wallis Lapsley
2	FW	(United States) USA	Adam Mickelson
3	DF	(New Zealand) NZL	Sean Cooper
4	DF	(United States) USA	Max Glasser
5	DF	(United States) USA	Tim Weidinger
6	DF	(United States) USA	Ryan Dieter
7	FW	(United States) USA	Robert Mejia
8	MF	(United States) USA	Grant Fidler
9	FW	(Canada) CAN	Wumi Aladetimi
10	DF	(United States) USA	Luke Hazel
11	MF	(United States) USA	Max Arfsten
12	DF	(United States) USA	Sean Bilter
13	MF	(New Zealand) NZL	Dylan Wood

No.	Pos.	Nation	Player
14	MF	(United States) USA	Andy Velasquez
15	MF	(United States) USA	Marte Formico
16	FW	(United States) USA	Jye Citizen
18	MF	(United States) USA	Nabi Kibunguchy
19	MF	(United States) USA	Emmanuel Doherty
20	DF	(United States) USA	Jake Haupt
21	FW	(United States) USA	Kristian Heptner
22	DF	(United States) USA	Kaleb Schirmacher
23	MF	(United States) USA	Connor Tipton
24	MF	(United States) USA	Whalen Shinn
25	MF	(United States) USA	Kameron Carey
26	GK	(United States) USA	Charles Janssen
27	MF	(United States) USA	Luke Giusto
28	MF	(United States) USA	Turner Humphrey

== Schedule ==
Date Time, TV	Rank^{#}	Opponent^{#}	Result	Record	Site (Attendance) City, State
Non-conference regular season
August 30*; 5:00 p.m.		at Wisconsin	W 2–0	1–0–0	Dan McClimon Stadium (472); Madison, WI
September 1*; 10:00 a.m.		at Marquette	T 0–0 ^{2OT}	1–0–1	Valley Fields (561); Milwaukee, WI
September 6*; 5:00 p.m.		Cal State Bakersfield	W 2–1	2–0–1	Aggie Soccer Field (549); Davis, CA
September 8*; 1:00 p.m.		No. 25 Air Force	W 2–0	3–0–1	Aggie Soccer Field (248); Davis, CA
September 13*; 7:00 p.m.		at San Diego	L 0–1	3–1–1	Torero Stadium (388); San Diego, CA
September 15*; 3:00 p.m.		at Loyola Marymount	L 0–1	3–2–1	Sullivan Field (316); Los Angeles, CA
September 19*; 7:30 p.m.		at Pacific	L 0–2	3–3–1	Knoles Field (311); Stockton, CA
September 21*; 7:00 p.m.		at San Jose State	W 3–1	4–3–1	Spartan Soccer Field (388); San Jose, CA
September 26*; 4:00 p.m.		at No. 6 Saint Mary's	W 4–2	5–3–1	Saint Mary's Stadium (435); Moraga, CA
October 5*; 3:00 p.m.		at Sacramento State	W 2–1 ^{OT}	6–3–1	Hornet Field (439); Sacramento, CA
Big West Conference regular season
October 9; 7:00 p.m.		at Cal Poly	W 1–0	7–3–1 (1–0–0)	Alex G. Spanos Stadium (1,070); San Luis Obispo, CA
October 12; 1:00 p.m.		Cal State Northridge	W 1–0	8–3–1 (2–0–0)	Aggie Soccer Field (483); Davis, CA
October 16; 7:00 p.m.		at UC Irvine	L 0–1	8–4–1 (2–1–0)	Anteater Stadium (272); Irvine, CA
October 19; 3:00 p.m.		UC Riverside	W 2–0	9–4–1 (3–1–0)	Aggie Soccer Field (584); Davis, CA
October 23; 3:00 p.m.		No. 20 UC Santa Barbara	T 1–1 ^{2OT}	9–4–2 (3–1–1)	Aggie Soccer Field (587); Davis, CA
October 26; 7:00 p.m.		at Cal State Fullerton	W 2–1 ^{2OT}	10–4–2 (4–1–1)	Titan Stadium (455); Fullerton, CA
November 2; 3:00 p.m.		Sacramento State	W 1–0	11–4–2 (5–1–1)	Aggie Soccer Field (842); Davis, CA
Big West Conference Tournament
November 9; 2:00 p.m.	(1) No. 24	(4) Cal State Fullerton; Semifinals	W 2–0	12–4–2	Aggie Soccer Field (879); Davis, CA
November 15; 2:00 p.m.	(1) No. 24	(2) No. 16 UC Santa Barbara; Championship Game	W 2–0	13–4–2	Aggie Soccer Field (1,308); Davis, CA
NCAA Tournament
November 24; 1:00 p.m.	(14) No. 18	Louisville; Second Round	L 0–1	13–5–2	Aggie Soccer Field (1,703); Davis, CA
*Non-conference game. ^{#}Rankings from United Soccer Coaches. (#) Tournament seedings in parentheses. All times are in Pacific Time.
