= 2019 Big West Conference men's soccer tournament =

- Classification: Division I
- Teams: 6
- Matches: 5
- Quarterfinals site: Higher seeds
- Semifinals site: Aggie Soccer Field; Davis, CA
- Finals site: Aggie Soccer Field; Davis, CA
- Champions: UC Davis (1st title)
- Winning coach: Dwayne Shaffer (1st title)
- MVP: Adam Mickelson (UC Davis)
- Broadcast: CBS SportsLive

2019 Big West Conference men's soccer standings
	Conf.					Overall
Team	W		L		T	W		L		T
No. 25 UC Davis ‡	5	–	1	–	1	12	–	5	–	2
No. 8 UC Santa Barbara+	4	–	1	–	2	15	–	4	–	4
UC Irvine	4	–	2	–	1	7	–	7	–	5
Cal State Fullerton	3	–	4	–	0	12	–	7	–	1
Cal Poly	3	–	4	–	0	7	–	9	–	1
Cal State Northridge	2	–	3	–	2	8	–	9	–	3
Sacramento State	2	–	4	–	1	7	–	9	–	2
UC Riverside	1	–	5	–	1	6	–	9	–	3
‡ – 2019 Big West Tournament champion + – Invited to the 2019 NCAA tournament; As of 17 December 2019; Rankings from United Soccer Coaches

The 2019 Big West Conference men's soccer tournament, was the 12th edition of the tournament. It determined the Big West Conference's automatic berth to the 2019 NCAA Division I men's soccer tournament.

UC Davis won the Big West Tournament, giving the program their first ever Big West title, and their first berth into the NCAA Tournament since 2008. UC Davis defeated UCSB in the final, 2–0. UC Davis senior forward, Adam Mickelson, was named the tournament's Most valuable player.

In addition to UC Davis, UCSB earned a berth in the NCAA Tournament. UC Davis earned their first ever national seeding and second round bye into the tournament, being seeded 14th overall. UC Davis were eliminated in the Second Round by Louisville, losing 1–0. UCSB won their first three NCAA Tournament games before losing to Wake Forest in the Quarterfinals.

== Seeds ==
Seed	School	Conference	Tiebreaker
1	UC Davis	5–1–1	
2	UCSB	4–1–2	
3	UC Irvine	4–2–1	
4	Cal Poly	3–4–0	
5	Cal State Fullerton	3–4–0	
6	CSUN	2–3–2	

== Bracket ==
Quarterfinals; November 6
4	Cal Poly	0
5	Cal State Fullerton	2
3	UC Irvine	2
6	CSUN	3

Semifinals; November 9
1	UC Davis	2
5	Cal State Fullerton	0
2	UCSB	2
6	CSUN	0

Championship; November 15
1	UC Davis	2
2	UCSB	0

== Results ==
=== Quarterfinals ===
6 November 2019	No. 4 Cal Poly	0–2	No. 5 Cal State Fullerton	San Luis Obispo, California
7:00 p.m. PST		Report	Lambe 23'; Sotelo 64'	Stadium: Alex G. Spanos Stadium; Attendance: 783; Referee: Rene Nunez

6 November 2019	No. 3 UC Irvine	2–3	No. 6 CSUN	Irvine, California
7:00 p.m. PST	Gutierrez 82'; Ortiz 89'	Report	Rubio 7'; Trejo 23'; Hunter 73'	Stadium: Anteater Stadium; Attendance: 477; Referee: Chris Calderon

=== Semifinals ===
9 November 2019	No. 1 UC Davis	2–0	No. 5 Cal State Fullerton	Davis, California
2:00 p.m. PDT	Arfsten 15'; Mickelson 56'	Report		Stadium: Aggie Soccer Field; Attendance: 879; Referee: Bernhard Hosu

9 November 2019	No. 2 UCSB	2–0	No. 6 CSUN	Santa Barbara, California
7:00 p.m. PDT	Baynham 24'; Michael 29'	Report		Stadium: Harder Stadium; Attendance: 1,126; Referee: Randy Hoffman

=== Final ===
15 November 2019	No. 1 UC Davis	2–0	No. 2 UCSB	Davis, California
2:00 p.m. PDT	Velasquez 55'; Heptner 90'	Report		Stadium: Aggie Soccer Field; Attendance: 1,308; Referee: Adrian Gonzalez
