= 2019 ASUN men's soccer tournament =

- Classification: Division I
- Teams: 6
- Matches: 5
- Quarterfinals site: Top two seeds
- Semifinals site: Top two seeds
- Finals site: J. Malcolm Simon Stadium; Newark, New Jersey
- Champions: NJIT (1st title)
- Winning coach: Fernando Barboto (1st title)
- MVP: Regsan Watkins (NJIT)
- Broadcast: ESPN+, Facebook Live

2019 Atlantic Sun Conference men's soccer standings
	Conf.					Overall
Team	W		L		T	W		L		T
NJIT ‡	5	–	1	–	0	10	–	5	–	4
Florida Gulf Coast	4	–	1	–	1	9	–	8	–	2
Stetson	3	–	2	–	1	8	–	10	–	2
North Florida	3	–	2	–	1	6	–	8	–	2
Lipscomb	3	–	3	–	0	5	–	9	–	2
Liberty	1	–	5	–	0	5	–	13	–	0
Jacksonville	0	–	5	–	1	5	–	7	–	2
‡ – 2019 ASUN Tournament champion + – Invited to the 2019 NCAA tournament; As of 22 November 2019; Rankings from United Soccer Coaches

The 2019 ASUN men's soccer tournament, the 41st edition of the ASUN Men's Soccer Tournament, determined the ASUN Conference's automatic berth for the 2019 NCAA Division I men's soccer tournament. The tournament began on November 8 and concluded on November 16.

NJIT, the ASUN regular season champion, won the tournament for the first and only time in program history; the Highlanders would join the America East Conference on July 1, 2020. They defeated Florida Gulf Coast in the finals, 2–1. NJIT earned their first-ever berth to the NCAA Tournament, where they were defeated in the first round by Providence.

== Seeds ==
Seed	School	Conference	Tiebreaker
1	NJIT	5–1–0	
2	Florida Gulf Coast	4–1–1	
3	North Florida	3–2–1	UNF 2–1 vs. STET
4	Stetson	3–2–1	STET 1–2 vs. UNF
5	Lipscomb	3–3–0	
6	Liberty	1–5–0	

== Bracket ==
First round Nov. 8
4	Stetson	2
5	Lipscomb	1
3	North Florida (OT)	3
6	Liberty	2

Semifinals; Nov. 10
1	NJIT	3
4	Stetson	2
2	FGCU	2
3	North Florida	1

Final; Nov. 16
1	NJIT	2
2	FGCU	1

== Results ==
=== First round ===
November 8
5:00 p.m. EST

No. 3 North Florida	3–2 (a.e.t.)	No. 6 Liberty
Estes (yellow card) 80'; Went 88'; Bubb 90'; Hawker (yellow card) 94' 99'	Report	Borutskie 4'; Welch 45'; Dutey (yellow card) 75'; Garcia (yellow card) 99'; Valdez (yellow card) 99'

FGCU Soccer Complex
Fort Myers, Florida
Attendance: 79
Referee: Esteban Rosano

November 8
7:00 p.m. EST

No. 4 Stetson	2–1	No. 5 Lipscomb
Degance 49'; Chalbaud 90'	Report	Wynia 59'

J. Malcolm Simon Stadium
Newark, New Jersey

=== Semifinals ===
November 10
1:00 p.m. EST

No. 2 FGCU	2–1	No. 3 North Florida
Rosales 5'; Perez (yellow card) 31'; Clement (yellow card) 32'; Medilah (yellow card) 34' (yellow-red card) 86'; Mullings 70'; TEAM (yellow card) 84'	Report	DeLeon, Jr. 12'; Everett (yellow card) 17' (yellow-red card) 87'; Abreu (yellow card) 41'; Hawker (yellow card) 84'

FGCU Soccer Complex
Fort Myers, Florida
Attendance: 278
Referee: Andres Pfefferkorn

November 10
3:00 p.m. EST

No. 1 NJIT	3–2	No. 4 Stetson
Rabell 19'; White 48'; Nino (yellow card) 64'; Reisgys (yellow card) 71'; Watkins 81'	Report	McCauley (yellow card) 15'; Clark (yellow card) 35'; Scattergood 49'; Busmann (yellow card) 80'; Chalbaud 89'

J. Malcolm Simon Stadium
Newark, New Jersey
Attendance: 591
Referee: Lorant Varga

=== Final ===
November 16
7:00 p.m. EST

No. 1 NJIT	2–1	No. 2 FGCU
Nino (yellow card) 4'; TEAM (yellow card) 51'; Rabell 70'; Alvarez (yellow card) 83'; Watkins 86'	Report	Bushey 45'; Rosales (yellow card) 52'

J. Malcolm Simon Stadium
Newark, New Jersey
Attendance: 735

== Statistics ==
=== Top goalscorers ===
2 Goals

- (Venezuela) Sebastian Chalbaud – Stetson
- (Puerto Rico) Alejandro Rabell – NJIT
- (South Africa) Regsan Watkins – NJIT

1 Goal

- (Canada) Brayden Borutskie – Liberty
- (United States) Zane Bubb – North Florida
- (United States) Noah Bushey – FGCU
- (United States) Chris Degance – Stetson
- (United States) Miguel DeLeon, Jr. – North Florida
- (Canada) O’Vonte Mullings – FGCU
- (United States) Ivan Rosales – FGCU
- (England) Lewis Scattergood – Stetson
- (United States) Tyler Welch – Liberty
- (Barbados) Torian Went – North Florida
- (United States) Rene White – NJIT

== All Tournament Team ==
**2019 ASUN Men's Soccer All-Tournament team**

**Regsan Watkins**, NJIT
Shak Adams, FGCU
Thomas Delplace, FGCU
O'Vonte Mullings, FGCU
Ivan Rosales, FGCU
Noah Gulden, Lipscomb
Ben Locke, Lipscomb
Alejandro Rabell, NJIT
Thomas Radon, NJIT
Rene White, NJIT
Sebastian Chalbaud, Stetson

MVP in **Bold**
