= J. Malcolm Simon Stadium =

Soccer Stadium

Coordinates: 40.741928°N 74.180910°W

J. Malcolm Simon Stadium was the home of the New Jersey Institute of Technology (NJIT Highlanders) men's and women's soccer teams.

The soccer teams played their home games and practice on campus at the all-weather Sprinturf-surfaced Lubetkin Field (which was in the stadium). The soccer field/stadium included lighting for nighttime play, bleacher seating for more than 1,000 spectators, a press box and a scoreboard.

The NJIT Baseball team and NJIT Track teams also used the facility for practice.

The stadium was demolished in 2015 for the construction of NJIT's new Wellness and Events Center which opened in the Fall of 2017.
