= Miguel Yuste =

Spanish clarinettist (1870–1947)

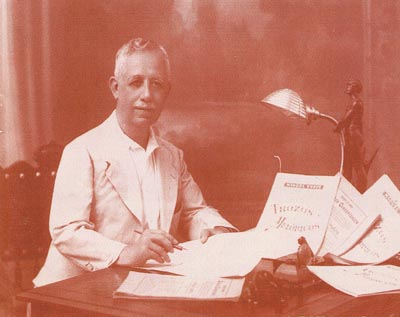
- Born: 20 June 1870; Alcalá del Valle, Spain
- Died: April 1947 (aged 76); Madrid, Spain
- Occupations: Clarinettist, composer, teacher

Miguel Yuste Moreno (Alcalá del Valle, Cádiz, 20 June 1870 – Madrid, April 1947) was a Spanish clarinetist, composer and teacher. He held the chair of clarinet at the Madrid Royal Conservatory from 1910 to 1940 and is regarded as a founding figure of the modern Spanish school of clarinet playing.

== Biography ==
Orphaned at the age of eight, Yuste was placed in the San Bernardino orphanage in Madrid, where he began his musical studies under the clarinettist José Chacón. He entered the Royal Conservatory in 1883, taking classes in solfeggio, clarinet and harmony, and was awarded first prizes in those subjects. At the age of fifteen he gained a place by competitive examination in the band of the Royal Corps of Halberdiers, and in 1887 he was appointed principal clarinet of the opera orchestra of the Buen Retiro gardens. He also played with the Madrid Concert Society, the orchestra of the Teatro Real, the Madrid Chamber Music Society, the Madrid Symphony Orchestra and the Royal Chapel. When the Madrid Municipal Band was founded in 1909, its conductor Ricardo Villa, a fellow student and friend, offered him the post of principal clarinet; Yuste served as the band's deputy conductor until 1931.

Yuste was a noted clarinet soloist and gave the Spanish premieres of Brahms's Clarinet Quintet in B minor, Op. 115, and his Clarinet Sonata No. 1 in F minor, Op. 120, first heard in Madrid in 1893 and 1896 respectively, on both occasions only a year after their first performances in Berlin and Vienna. Both concerts took place at the Salón Romero, the concert hall founded by the clarinettist and teacher Antonio Romero y Andía.

Yuste continued the teaching tradition of Romero y Andía, whom he succeeded in 1910 as professor of clarinet at the Madrid Royal Conservatory, a chair he held until 1940. From it he revised the official syllabus of the subject, unchanged since his own student years, raising its demands through a method of his own arranged in three complementary areas of study. His pupils included clarinettists who went on to hold positions in the Madrid Municipal Band, the Madrid Symphony Orchestra, the Madrid Philharmonic Orchestra and the Spanish National Orchestra, among them Julián Menéndez González and Leocadio Fuertes y Bondía.

=== Family ===
Yuste married Purificación Azofra Barilonga (b. Logroño, 1870), with whom he had nine children, three of whom died in infancy. (Note: Documentation held in the family archive.) His son Miguel Yuste Azofra followed his father's career as a clarinettist. He is the grandfather of the comedian Josema Yuste. Widowed, he married the pianist Feliciana Agero García, who was the first teacher of the pianist Isidro Barrio. A daughter of this marriage, Ascensión Yuste Agüero, taught solfeggio and music theory at the Madrid Royal Conservatory.

== Works ==
Yuste's catalogue, numbered by opus, is devoted largely to wind instruments, whose solo repertoire was scarce in Spain at the beginning of the twentieth century. His writing combines technical demands with a lyrical treatment of the instrument, with cantabile passages that imitate the human voice and virtuosic display reserved for cadenzas and closing sections.

Although it was believed in the early twentieth century that Yuste had written more than a hundred works for clarinet, later research established that only seven pieces for clarinet and piano were published. Among them is the Gran solo de concurso, Op. 39, in which the staccato and the altissimo register are particularly demanding, to the point that the composer himself indicates the fingerings he considers most suitable. He also wrote the Solo de concurso, Op. 34, originally conceived for bassoon and later transcribed for euphonium and tenor saxophone, De noble estirpe, Op. 48, for horn, two Caprichos, Opp. 50 and 56, for trombone, and an examination piece for trumpet, Op. 96. The last work of his of which there is record is O salutaris, Op. 202.

== Legacy ==
A street in the Suanzes district of Madrid is named after him, well known locally because the headquarters of the newspaper El País stands on it.
