= Daniel Steedman =

Scottish footballer (born 2000)

Personal information
- Date of birth: 31 January 2000 (age 26)
- Place of birth: Glasgow, Scotland
- Position: Midfielder

Youth career
- 2013–2017: Charlotte Soccer Academy

College career
Years	Team	Apps	(Gls)
2018–2019	Virginia Cavaliers	37	(5)

Senior career*
Years	Team	Apps	(Gls)
2018	Charlotte Independence	3	(0)
2020	Atlanta United 2	13	(0)
2021	North Carolina FC	8	(0)
2024	Tormenta FC	20	(0)
- * Club domestic league appearances and goals

Daniel Steedman (born 31 January 2000) is a Scottish footballer who plays as a midfielder.

== Career ==
=== Youth and college ===
On 3 September 2018, Steedman made his college soccer debut for Virginia playing 82 minutes in 0–0 draw against Maryland in a rivalry match at Audi Field. On 12 October, he scored his first collegiate goal in a 4–1 win over Clemson. A week later, he scored his second goal of the season against Wake Forest. He finished his freshman year and the 2018 Atlantic Coast Conference men's soccer season being named to the All-ACC Freshman Team.

=== Senior ===
On 13 February 2018, Steedman signed an amateur contract with the Charlotte Independence which would allow him to retain his NCAA eligibility, while playing in a professional environment.

On 12 May Steedman made his USL debut, coming on in a 4–1 win against FC Cincinnati.

Steedman played two years of college soccer at the University of Virginia in 2018 and 2019, before signing a professional contract with USL Championship side Atlanta United 2 on 8 January 2020.

On 21 January 2021, Steedman was selected 28th overall in the 2021 MLS SuperDraft by Austin FC. However, he wasn't signed by the club.

In July 2021, Steedman trialed with Scottish Championship side Partick Thistle.

On 27 August, Steedman signed with USL League One side North Carolina FC for the remainder of the season.

Steedman joined Tormenta FC of USL League One on December 27, 2023.
