= Thibaut Jacquel =

French footballer (born 1997)

Personal information
- Date of birth: March 13, 1997 (age 29)
- Place of birth: Saverne, France
- Height: 6 ft 1 in (1.85 m)
- Position: Forward

Team information
- Current team: US Thionville Lusitanos

Youth career
- –2017: Metz

College career
Years	Team	Apps	(Gls)
2018–2020	Campbell Fighting Camels	41	(22)

Senior career*
Years	Team	Apps	(Gls)
2017–2018	FC Trémery	30	(5)
2019	Lionsbridge FC	12	(7)
2021	North Texas SC	15	(4)
2022	Fola Esch	13	(9)
2022–	US Thionville Lusitanos	42	(28)
- * Club domestic league appearances and goals as of 16:35, 5 July 2024 (UTC)

Thibaut Jacquel (born 13 March 1997) is a French footballer who plays as a forward for US Thionville Lusitanos.

== Playing career ==
=== Youth, College & Amateur ===
Jacquel was part of the FC Metz academy until he was released by the club at 19-years old. He went on to spend a season with National 3 side FC Trémery, scoring 5 goals in 30 appearances.

In 2018, Jacquel made the move to the United States to play college soccer at Campbell University. In two seasons at Campbell, Jacquel made 41 appearances, scoring 22 goals and tallying 13 assists. In 2018, Jacquel achieved an honourable mention as an All-Conference selection and led the Big South in assists. In 2019, he was named 3rd-team All-America, 2nd-team All-South Region by United Soccer Coaches, was chosen to Best XI 3rd team by Top Drawer Soccer and No. 32 among the nation's Top 100 upperclassmen. Jacquel led the nation in goals, and was Big South Attacking Player of the Year, 1st-team All-Conference, Big South All-Tournament team. The 2020 season at Campbell was cancelled due to the COVID-19 pandemic.

While at college, Jacquel also played in the USL League Two with Lionsbridge FC in 2019, where he scored 7 goals and tallied 1 assist in 12 regular season appearances.

=== Professional ===
On 21 January 2021, Jacquel was selected 75th overall in the 2021 MLS SuperDraft by FC Dallas. On 29 March 2021, he signed with Dallas' USL League One affiliate side North Texas SC.

Jacquel made his debut on 24 April 2021, starting in a 4–2 win over Fort Lauderdale CF and scoring two goals.

In January 2022, Jacquel signed with Luxembourg National Division champions Fola Esch.
