= Gonzaga Bulldogs men's soccer =

American college soccer team

- Founded: 1980; 46 years ago
- University: Gonzaga University
- Head coach: Chris McGaughey (1st season)
- Conference: Pac-12
- Location: Spokane, Washington, US
- Stadium: Gonzaga Soccer Field (capacity: 1,500)
- Nickname: Zags, Bulldogs
- Colors: Navy blue, white, and red
Home	Away

NCAA tournament appearances
- 2001, 2007

Conference regular season championships
- 1997, 1998

The Gonzaga Bulldogs Men's Soccer program represents Gonzaga University in all NCAA Division I men's college soccer competitions. As of the upcoming 2026 season, the Bulldogs play in the Pac-12 Conference, which it will join in July 2026 after having spent more than four decades in the West Coast Conference. The Bulldogs are coached by Chris McGaughey, who was named interim head coach before the 2025 season and had the interim tag removed that November.

Einar Thorarinsson had from coached the team since he joined them in 1995 from Whitworth College. During his tenure they were transformed from a mediocre team, in 1994 they had gone 2-13-1, into an annual contender for the WCC men's soccer crown. He also led the Zags to their only two NCAA Tournament appearances in 2001 and 2007. He retired in 2017

== Players ==
=== Current squad ===
As of January 16, 2024

Note: Flags indicate national team as defined under FIFA eligibility rules; some limited exceptions apply. Players may hold more than one non-FIFA nationality.

No.	Pos.	Nation	Player
—	GK	NED	Wessel Sprangers
—	DF	NED	Pieter Hamhuis
—	DF	ESP	Diego Doménech
—	MF	ITA	Stefano Campisi
—	MF	NED	Jelle van Deijck
—	MF	USA	Sam Dahlin
—	MF	ESP	Jorge Aspas
—	FW	GER	Leon Sitz
—	FW	PUR	Ian Silva
—	FW	USA	Nicholas Bianchi

== Honors ==
- 1997: West Coast Conference Champions^{[1]}
- 1998: West Coast Conference Champions^{[1]}

== Notes ==
1. ^{a} ^{b} Title shared with Santa Clara University in 1997 and University of San Diego in 1998
