= Aggie Soccer Field =

Soccer stadium at the University of California, Davis

- Aggie Field
- Interactive map of Aggie Soccer Field
- Location: Unincorporated Yolo County adjacent to Davis, California
- Coordinates: 38°32′30″N 121°45′23″W
- Owner: University of California, Davis
- Capacity: 1,000
- Surface: Natural grass

Tenants
- UC Davis Aggies men's soccer UC Davis Aggies women's soccer

Aggie Soccer Field, also known as Aggie Field, is a 1,000 seat soccer stadium on the campus of the University of California, Davis, adjacent to Davis, California.

Aggie Soccer Field was the result of volunteer efforts dating back to the mid-1980s, the same as the Dobbins Baseball Complex which is the home to UC Davis Aggies baseball.
