= 2019 Pac-12 Conference men's soccer season =

- League: NCAA Division I
- Sport: Soccer
- Duration: August 2019 – November 2019
- Teams: 6

2020 MLS SuperDraft

Regular Season
- Champions: Washington
- Runners-up: Stanford

Pac-12 Conference men's soccer seasons
- ← 2018 2020 →

2019 Pac-12 Conference men's soccer standings
	Conf.					Overall
Team	W		L		T	W		L		T
No. 6 Washington †	9	–	2	–	0	16	–	4	–	0
No. 4 Stanford +	6	–	2	–	2	14	–	3	–	5
Oregon State	5	–	3	–	2	8	–	5	–	2
California +	4	–	4	–	2	8	–	7	–	3
UCLA	2	–	6	–	1	6	–	9	–	2
San Diego State	1	–	9	–	0	4	–	12	–	2
† – Conference champion + – Invited to the 2019 NCAA Tournament; As of 17 December 2019; Rankings from United Soccer Coaches

The 2019 Pac-12 Conference men's soccer season was the 20th season of men's varsity soccer in the conference. The season began in August 2019 and concluded in November 2019.

== Background ==
=== Previous season ===
The four-time defending champions, Stanford, successfully defended their Pac-12 title. The Cardinal entered the NCAA Tournament as the three-time defending champions, but were eliminated by Akron in the quarterfinals. Joining Stanford in the tournament were Oregon State, Washington, and UCLA.

=== Coaching changes ===
On March 12, 2019, UCLA head coach, Jorge Salcedo was arrested, and indicted by a federal grand jury in Boston for conspiracy to commit racketeering for alleged participation in the 2019 college admissions bribery scandal. His indictment charged Salcedo with taking $200,000 in bribes to help two students, one in 2016 and one in 2018, get admitted to UCLA using falsified soccer credential admission information.

As a result, he was placed on leave by UCLA from his coaching position at the school. On March 21, 2019, it was announced that he had resigned.

During the spring season matches between March 21 and April 29, 2019 assistant coaches Phil Marfuggi and Matt Taylor took over coaching duties on an interim basis. On April 29, 2019, UCLA hired Ryan Jorden as the head coach of the program. Jorden had previously coached University of the Pacific men's soccer team.

School	Outgoing coach	Manner of departure	Date of vacancy	Position in table	Incoming coach	Date of appointment
UCLA	(United States) Jorge Salcedo	Resigned	March 21, 2019	Preseason	(United States) Matt Taylor (interim)	March 22, 2019
UCLA	(United States) Matt Taylor (interim)	End of caretaker period	April 29, 2019	Preseason	(United States) Ryan Jorden	April 29, 2019

== Teams ==
=== Head coaches ===
As of 2018 season

Team	Head coach	Previous job	Years at school	Overall record	Record at school	Pac-12 record	NCAA Tournaments	NCAA College Cups	NCAA Titles
California	Kevin Grimes	SMU^{AC}	19	185–124–42 (.587)	185–124–42 (.587)	82–79–21 (.508)	11	0	0
Oregon State	Terry Boss	Virginia^{AC}	2	18–17–3 (.513)	18–17–3 (.513)	10–9–1 (.525)	0	0	0
San Diego State	Lev Kirshner	Rutgers^{AC}	19	154–168–58 (.482)	138–167–55 (.460)	36–71–24 (.366)	3	0	0
Stanford	Jeremy Gunn	Charlotte	7	283–90–54 (.726)	96–29–23 (.726)	45–14–11 (.721)	12	4	3
UCLA	Ryan Jorden	Pacific	1	98–43–16 (.675)	0–0–0 (–)	0–0–0 (–)	2	0	0
Washington	Jamie Clark	Creighton	9	138–57–23 (.686)	99–42–20 (.677)	48–23–9 (.656)	8	0	0

- AC = Assistant coach

=== Stadiums and locations ===
Team	Location	Stadium	Capacity
California Golden Bears	Berkeley, California	Edwards Stadium	22,000
Oregon State Beavers	Corvallis, Oregon	Lorenz Field	2,200
San Diego State Aztecs	San Diego, California	SDSU Sports Deck	1,000
Stanford Cardinal	Stanford, California	Cagan Stadium	4,000
UCLA Bruins	Los Angeles, California	Wallis Annenberg Stadium	3,000
Washington Huskies	Seattle, Washington	Husky Soccer Stadium	1,640

- Arizona, Arizona State, Colorado, Oregon, USC, Utah, and Washington State sponsor men's soccer at the club level and thus do not compete in the Pac-12 Conference. San Diego State is an associate member.

== Regular season ==
Index to colors and formatting
Pac-12 member won
Pac-12 member lost
Pac-12 member tied
Pac-12 teams in **bold**

All times Pacific time.

=== Conference results ===
Each team plays every other conference team twice; once home and once away.

Home \ Away	CAL	OSU	SDSU	STA	UCLA	UW
California	—	2–1	Nov. 3	1–2	Oct. 31	0–1
Oregon State	Nov. 10	—	2–1	Nov. 7	2–0	Nov. 15
San Diego State	0–4	Oct. 24	—	0–1	Nov. 16	Nov. 7
Stanford	Nov. 14	1–1	Oct. 31	—	Nov. 3	1–2
UCLA	3–3	Oct. 27	5–2	0–1	—	Oct. 24
Washington	Nov. 7	2–1	2–0	Nov. 10	5–0	—

Source: Pac-12 Conference
Legend: Blue = home team win; Yellow = draw; Red = away team win.
For upcoming matches, an "a" indicates there is an article about the rivalry between the two participants.

=== Positions by round ===
Team ╲ Round	1	2	3	4	5	6	7	8	9	10
Washington	1	1	1	1	1	1				
Stanford	3	4	2	3	2					
California	4	3	4	5	3					
Oregon State	2	2	3	2	4					
UCLA	5	6	6	4	5					
San Diego State	6	5	5	6	6	6				

Leader and 2019 NCAA Division I Men's Soccer Tournament

Source: Pac-12.com

== Postseason ==
=== NCAA Tournament ===
The NCAA Tournament began in November 2019 and concluded in December 2019.

Seed	Region	School	1st Round	2nd Round	3rd Round	Quarterfinals	Semifinals	Championship
6	3	Washington	BYE	W, 2–0 vs. Boston College – (Seattle)	W, 4–1 vs. (11) Marshall – (Seattle)	L, 1–2 at (3) Georgetown – (Washington, D.C.)	—	—
7	4	Stanford	BYE	T, 1–1 (W, 2–1 PK) vs. Seattle U – (Stanford)	W, 2–1 vs. (10) Virginia Tech – (Stanford)	T, 1–1 (W, 5–4 PK) at (2) Clemson – (Clemson)	L, 0–2 vs. (3) Georgetown – (Cary)	—

== Rankings ==
=== National rankings ===
	Improvement in ranking
	Drop in ranking
RV	Received votes but were not ranked in Top 25
NV	No votes received

		Pre	Wk 1	Wk 2	Wk 3	Wk 4	Wk 5	Wk 6	Wk 7	Wk 8	Wk 9	Wk 10	Wk 11	Wk 12	Wk 13	Wk 14	Wk 15	Wk 16	Final
California	USC	NV	NV	RV	NV	NV	NV	NV	RV						None released				
California	TDS	NV	NV	RV	25	NV	NV	NV	NV	NV	NV								
Oregon State	USC	22	RV	RV	NV	NV	NV	NV	NV						None released				
Oregon State	TDS	RV	RV	NV	NV	NV	NV	NV	RV	NV	NV								
San Diego State	USC	NV	NV	NV	NV	NV	NV	NV	NV						None released				
San Diego State	TDS	NV	NV	NV	NV	NV	NV	NV	NV	NV	NV								
Stanford	USC	5	4	3	2	1	2	7	5						None released				
Stanford	TDS	5	5	3	2	2	1	3	10	11	10								
UCLA	USC	RV	NV	NV	RV	NV	NV	NV	NV						None released				
UCLA	TDS	NV	NV	NV	13	19	NV	NV	NV	NV	NV								
Washington	USC	RV	13	8	12	10	7	2	2						None released				
Washington	TDS	RV	RV	13	11	12	13	13	2	2	1								

=== Regional rankings - USC Far West Region ===
	Improvement in ranking
	Drop in ranking
RV	Received votes but were not ranked in Top 10
NV	No votes received

The United Soccer Coaches' Far West region ranks teams across the Pac-12, Big West, and WAC.

	Wk 1	Wk 2	Wk 3	Wk 4	Wk 5	Wk 6	Wk 7	Wk 8	Wk 9	Wk 10	Wk 11	Wk 12
California	7	5	7	9	NV	8	NV	9				
Oregon State	NV	NV	NV	8	7	NV	NV	NV				
San Diego State	NV	NV	NV	NV	NV	NV	NV	NV				
Stanford	1	2	1	1	1	2	2	2				
UCLA	10	7	5	NV	NV	10	10	NV				
Washington	2	1	3	2	2	1	1	1				

== Awards and honors ==
=== Player of the week honors ===
Following each week's games, Pac-12 conference officials select the player of the week.

Week	Player	School	Pos.	Ref.
Sep. 3	Justin Garces	UCLA	GK	
Sep. 10	Milan Iloski	UCLA	MF	
Sep. 17	Tanner Beason	Stanford	DF	
Sep. 24	Sofiane Djeffal	Oregon State	FW	
Oct. 1	Pablo Pelaez	San Diego State	MF	
Oct. 8	Milan Iloski	UCLA	MF	
Oct. 15	Ousseni Bouda	Stanford	FW	
Oct. 22				
Oct. 29				
Nov. 5				
Nov. 12				
Nov. 19				

=== Postseason honors ===
2019 Pac-12 Men's Soccer Individual Awards
Award	Recipient(s)
Player of the Year	Blake Bodily – Washington
Defensive Player of the Year	Ethan Bartlow – Washington
Coach of the Year	Jamie Clark – Washington
Freshman of the Year	Ousseni Bouda – Stanford

2019 Pac-12 Men's Soccer All-Conference Teams
First Team Honorees	Second Team Honorees	Third Team Honorees
Milan Iloski, UCLA; Ousseni Bouda, Stanford; Blake Bodily, Washington; Taylor Davila, California; Sofiane Djeffal, Oregon State; Derek Waldeck, Stanford; Joel Walker, Oregon State; Ethan Bartlow, Washington; Joe Hafferty, Oregon State; Simon Lekressner, California; Andrew Thomas, Stanford	Tommy Williamson, California; Riley Ferch, UCLA; Jared Gilbey, Stanford; John Magnus, Washington; Pablo Pelaez, San Diego State; Logan Panchot, Stanford; Tanner Beason, Stanford; Adrian Crespo, Oregon State; JJ Foe Nuphaus, California; Matthew Powell, UCLA; Drake Callender, California	Hunter George, San Diego State; Zach Ryan, Stanford; Charlie Wehan, Stanford; Eric Iloski, UCLA; Francisco Perez, California; Christian Soto, Washington; Dylan Teves, Washington; Adam Vargas, San Diego State; Eric Diaz, Oregon State; Christopher Grey, California; Ian Lonergan, California; Sam Fowler, Washington

=== National awards ===
Player	Pos.	School	Honor	Ref.
Ethan Bartlow	DF	Washington	College Soccer News Third-Team All-American	
Ethan Bartlow	DF	Washington	Soccer America Second-Team All-American	
Ethan Bartlow	DF	Washington	TopDrawer Soccer Second-Team All-American	
Ethan Bartlow	DF	Washington	United Soccer Coaches Second-Team All-American	
Tanner Beason	DF	Stanford	College Soccer News First-Team All-American	
Tanner Beason	DF	Stanford	Soccer America First-Team All-American	
Tanner Beason	DF	Stanford	TopDrawer Soccer Third-Team All-American	
Tanner Beason	DF	Stanford	United Soccer Coaches First-Team All-American	
Tanner Beason	DF	Stanford	Senior CLASS Award Senior All-American	
Blake Bodily	MF	Washington	College Soccer News First-Team All-American	
Blake Bodily	MF	Washington	Soccer America First-Team All-American	
Blake Bodily	MF	Washington	TopDrawer Soccer First-Team All-American	
Blake Bodily	MF	Washington	United Soccer Coaches First-Team All-American	
Ousseni Bouda	FW	Stanford	College Soccer News First-Team Freshman All-American	
Ousseni Bouda	FW	Stanford	TopDrawer Soccer First-Team Freshman All-American	
Sam Fowler	GK	Washington	College Soccer News Second-Team Freshman All-American	
Sam Fowler	GK	Washington	TopDrawer Soccer Third-Team Freshman All-American	
Kasey French	DF	Washington	CoSIDA Third-Team Academic All-American	
Keegan Hughes	DF	Stanford	College Soccer News First-Team Freshman All-American	
Keegan Hughes	DF	Stanford	TopDrawer Soccer Second-Team Freshman All-American	
Milan Iloski	FW	UCLA	College Soccer News Second-Team All-American	
Milan Iloski	FW	UCLA	TopDrawer Soccer Third-Team All-American	
Christian Soto	MF	Washington	College Soccer News Third-Team Freshman All-American	
Christian Soto	MF	Washington	TopDrawer Soccer Second-Team Freshman All-American	
Andrew Thomas	GK	Stanford	College Soccer News Second-Team All-American	
Andrew Thomas	GK	Stanford	Soccer America Third-Team All-American	
Andrew Thomas	GK	Stanford	TopDrawer Soccer Third-Team All-American	
Andrew Thomas	GK	Stanford	United Soccer Coaches Third-Team All-American	
Andrew Thomas	GK	Stanford	CoSIDA Second-Team Academic All-American	

== 2020 MLS Draft ==
The 2020 MLS SuperDraft was held on January 9, 2020.

=== Total picks by school ===
Team	Round 1	Round 2	Round 3	Total
California	–	1	–	1
Oregon State	–	–	–	0
San Diego State	–	–	–	0
Stanford	1	–	1	2
UCLA	–	–	–	0
Washington	–	–	1	1
Total	1	1	2	4

=== List of selections ===
Round	Pick #	MLS team	Player	Position	College
1	12	San Jose Earthquakes	(United States) Tanner Beason	DF	Stanford
2	30	New England Revolution	(United States) Simon Lekressner	DF	California
3	58	Sporting Kansas City	(United States) Jaret Townsend	MF	Washington
3	66	FC Dallas	(United States) Derek Waldeck	MF	Stanford

== Homegrown players ==
The Homegrown Player Rule is a Major League Soccer program that allows MLS teams to sign local players from their own development academies directly to MLS first team rosters. Before the creation of the rule in 2008, every player entering Major League Soccer had to be assigned through one of the existing MLS player allocation processes, such as the MLS SuperDraft.

To place a player on its homegrown player list, making him eligible to sign as a homegrown player, players must have resided in that club's home territory and participated in the club's youth development system for at least one year. Players can play college soccer and still be eligible to sign a homegrown contract.

Original MLS team	Player	Pos.	School	Ref.
San Jose Earthquakes	Drake Callender	GK	California (Jr.)	
