= 2020 MLS SuperDraft =

College draft for soccer teams

General information
- Sport: Soccer
- Date: January 9, 2020
- Time: 12:00 p.m. EDT
- Network: Twitter.com

Overview
- 77 total selections in 4 rounds
- League: Major League Soccer
- Teams: 26
- First selection: Robbie Robinson, Inter Miami CF
- Most selections: Nashville SC (9)

The 2020 MLS SuperDraft was the 21st edition of the SuperDraft conducted by Major League Soccer. The 2020 SuperDraft was the first SuperDraft held exclusively via conference call and web streaming. The first two rounds of the 2020 SuperDraft were held on January 9, 2020 while rounds three and four were held on January 13, 2020. Previously, the SuperDraft had been held in conjunction with the annual January United Soccer Coaches convention.

== Format ==
The SuperDraft format has remained constant throughout its history and closely resembles that of the NFL draft:

1. Any expansion teams receive the first picks. MLS has announced that Inter Miami CF and Nashville SC would begin play as expansion teams in 2020. Inter Miami CF would select first, and Nashville SC second.
2. Non-playoff clubs receive the next picks in reverse order of prior season finish.
3. Teams that made the MLS Cup Playoffs are then ordered by which round of the playoffs they are eliminated.
4. The winners of the MLS Cup are given the last selection, and the losers the penultimate selection.

== Player selection ==
Player key
*	Denotes player who has been selected for an MLS Best XI team						
^	Member of 2020 Generation Adidas class						
†	Player who was named to an MLS Best XI and Generation Adidas						
Signed key
21	Denotes player who signed for an MLS team (Division I)						
30	Denotes player who signed for a USL Championship team (Division II)						
16	Denotes player who signed for a USL League One or NISA team (Division III)						
4	Denotes player who signed for a team outside the United States soccer league system						
Positions key
GK	Goalkeeper	DF	Defender	MF	Midfielder	FW	Forward

=== Round 1 ===
P	MLS team	Player	Pos.	College	Conference	Academy team	Amateur team	Signed
1	Inter Miami CF	(United States) Robbie Robinson	FW	Clemson	ACC	Charleston Battery	—N/a	(United States) Inter Miami CF
2	Nashville SC	(United States) Jack Maher	DF	Indiana	Big Ten	Saint Louis FC	Saint Louis FC U23	(United States) Nashville SC
3	Inter Miami CF (Note: No. 3: FC Cincinnati → Inter Miami CF. November 19, 2019: Inter Miami CF acquired a first-round selection in the 2020 SuperDraft in exchange for $150,000 of General Allocation Money.)	(United States) Dylan Nealis	MF	Georgetown	Big East	BW Gottschee	Long Island Rough Riders	(United States) Inter Miami CF
4	Vancouver Whitecaps FC	(Canada) Ryan Raposo	MF	Syracuse	ACC	Vaughan SC	Vaughan Azzurri	(Canada) Vancouver Whitecaps FC
5	Orlando City SC	(United States) Daryl Dike	FW	Virginia	ACC	OKC Energy	OKC Energy U23	(United States) Orlando City SC
6	New England Revolution (Note: No. 6: Sporting Kansas City → New England Revolution. August 6, 2018: New England Revolution acquired a first-round selection in the 2020 SuperDraft, $100,000 in general allocation money, and $250,000 in targeted allocation money from Sporting Kansas City in exchange for forward Krisztián Németh.)	(United States) Henry Kessler	DF	Virginia	ACC	New York Red Bulls	Charlottesville Alliance	(United States) New England Revolution
7	Columbus Crew	(Spain) Miguel Berry	FW	San Diego	WCC	San Diego Surf	Orange County SC U-23	(United States) Columbus Crew
8	Houston Dynamo	(United States) Garrett McLaughlin	FW	SMU	American	Oklahoma FC 97	OKC Energy U23	(United States) Rio Grande Valley FC
9	Montreal Impact	(United States) Jeremy Kelly	MF	North Carolina	ACC	Carolina RailHawks	North Carolina FC U23	(United States) Colorado Rapids
10	New York Red Bulls (Note: No. 10: Chicago Fire → New York Red Bulls. January 9, 2020: New York Red Bulls acquired a first-round selection in the 2020 SuperDraft from Chicago Fire FC in exchange for $100,000 of General Allocation Money.)	(United States) Patrick Seagrist	DF	Marquette	Big East	Sockers FC	Chicago FC United	(United States) New York Red Bulls
11	Nashville SC (Note: No. 11: Colorado Rapids → Nashville SC. January 9, 2020: Nashville SC acquired a first-round selection in the 2020 SuperDraft from Colorado Rapids in exchange for $75,000 of General Allocation Money.)	(Canada) Alistair Johnston	MF	Wake Forest	ACC	Vaughan SC	Vaughan Azzurri	(United States) Nashville SC
12	San Jose Earthquakes	(United States) Tanner Beason	DF	Stanford	Pac-12	North Carolina Fusion	San Francisco City	(United States) San Jose Earthquakes
13	Nashville SC (Note: No. 13: New England Revolution → Nashville SC. January 9, 2020: Nashville SC acquired a first-round selection in the 2020 SuperDraft from Colorado Rapids in exchange for $50,000 of General Allocation Money and $50,000 in conditional General Allocation Money.)	(United States) Elliot Panicco	GK	Charlotte	C-USA	Carolina Rapids	—N/a	(United States) Nashville SC
14	FC Dallas	(United States) Nkosi Tafari	DF	Seattle	WAC	Dix Hills Heat	—N/a	(United States) FC Dallas
15	New York Red Bulls	(Senegal) Cherif Dieye	MF	Louisville	ACC	IMG Academy	—N/a	(United States) New York Red Bulls II
16	Portland Timbers	(Republic of Ireland) Aaron Molloy	MF	Penn State	Big Ten	Bohemians	Reading United	(United States) Portland Timbers 2
17	FC Dallas (Note: No. 17: D.C. United → FC Dallas. May 3, 2019: FC Dallas acquired a first-round selection in the 2020 SuperDraft from D.C. United in exchange for $100,000 in general allocation money. Simultaneously, Dallas also waived defender Marquinhos Pedroso who was subsequently claimed by D.C.)	(United States) Cal Jennings	FW	UCF	American	Georgia United	—N/a	(United States) Memphis 901
18	Minnesota United FC	(New Zealand) Noah Billingsley	DF	UC Santa Barbara	Big West	Waitakere United	—N/a	(United States) Minnesota United FC
19	Toronto FC (Note: No. 19: LA Galaxy → Toronto FC. April 11, 2019: Toronto FC acquired a first-round selection in the 2020 SuperDraft and the No. 2 spot in the MLS Allocation Order from LA Galaxy in exchange for the No. 1 spot in the MLS Allocation Order. LA used its allocation spot to sign defender Giancarlo González.)	(Canada) Nyal Higgins	DF	Syracuse	ACC	Ajax Soccer Club	Vaughan Azzurri	(Canada) Toronto FC II
20	Real Salt Lake	(Antigua and Barbuda) Dayonn Harris	MF	UConn	American	Vaughan Azzurri	Vaughan Azzurri	(United States) Real Monarchs
21	D.C. United (Note: No. 21: Philadelphia Union → D.C. United. January 9, 2020: D.C. United acquired a first-round selection in the 2020 SuperDraft and the No. 21 spot in the MLS Allocation Order from Philadelphia Union in exchange for the No. 17 spot in the MLS Allocation Order and future considerations.)	(France) Simon Lefebvre	GK	Temple	American	Girondins de Bordeaux	Reading United	(United States) Loudoun United
22	New York City FC	(United States) Jesus Perez	MF	UIC	Horizon	Chicago Fire FC	Chicago FC United	(United States) Tacoma Defiance
23	Atlanta United FC	(Denmark) Patrick Nielsen	DF	Michigan State	Big Ten	Hvidovre IF	Flint City Bucks	(United States) Atlanta United 2
24	Los Angeles FC	(Brazil) Paulo Pita	GK	Marshall	C-USA	Oklahoma FC 97	FC Wichita	(United States) North Carolina FC
25	Toronto FC	(Nigeria) Ifunanyachi Achara	FW	Georgetown	Big East	Chicago Magic PSG	Black Rock FC	(Canada) Toronto FC
26	Chicago Fire FC (Note: No. 26: Seattle Sounders FC → Chicago Fire. November 26, 2019: Chicago Fire FC acquired a first-round selection in the 2020 SuperDraft from Seattle Sounders FC in exchange for a second-round selection in the 2020 SuperDraft and goalkeeper Stefan Cleveland.)	(Trinidad and Tobago) Jonathan Jimenez	DF	Pacific	WCC	—N/a	Portland Timbers U23	(United States) Rio Grande Valley FC

=== Round 2 ===
P	MLS team	Player	Pos.	College	Conference	Academy team	Amateur team	Signed
27	San Jose Earthquakes (Note: No. 27: Inter Miami → San Jose Earthquakes. November 12, 2019: San Jose Earthquakes acquired a second-round selection in the 2020 SuperDraft from Inter Miami CF in exchange for the Homegrown Player Rights to goalkeeper Drake Callender. San Jose may also receive up to $150,000 in general allocation money if certain incentives are met.)	(United States) Jack Skahan	MF	North Carolina	ACC	Philadelphia Union	North Carolina FC U23	(United States) San Jose Earthquakes
28	Nashville SC	(United States) Tanner Dieterich	MF	Clemson	ACC	Real Salt Lake AZ	Nashville SC U23	(United States) Nashville SC
29	FC Cincinnati	(United States) Rey Ortiz	FW	Portland	WCC	LA Galaxy	Portland Timbers U23s	(United States) FC Cincinnati
30	New England Revolution (Note: No. 30: Vancouver Whitecaps FC → New England Revolution. December 10, 2017: New England Revolution acquired a conditional second-round selection in the 2020 SuperDraft and a first-round selection in the 2019 MLS SuperDraft from Vancouver Whitecaps FC in exchange for forward Kei Kamara.)	(United States) Simon Lekressner	DF	California	Pac-12	Crossfire Premier	San Francisco Glens	(United States) New England Revolution II
31	Orlando City SC	(Jamaica) Joey DeZart	MF	Wake Forest	ACC	Philadelphia Union	Reading United	(United States) Orlando City SC
32	Vancouver Whitecaps FC (Note: No. 32: Sporting Kansas City → Vancouver Whitecaps FC. December 14, 2018: Vancouver Whitecaps FC acquired a second-round selection in the 2020 SuperDraft and a first-round selection in the 2021 SuperDraft from Sporting Kansas City in exchange for forward Erik Hurtado. The traded picks are Kansas City's natural selections.)	(United States) Daniel Gagliardi	GK	FIU	C-USA	Kendall SC	IMG Academy Bradenton	(United States) Fort Lauderdale CF
33	Toronto FC (Note: No. 33: Columbus Crew → Toronto FC. Trade details needed. As retrieved on December 14, 2019, the MLS website stated that Toronto acquired this pick from Columbus via a trade. However, no trade between the clubs involving a 2020 SuperDraft pick was ever announced.)	(Senegal) Malick Mbaye	DF	Clemson	ACC	SIMA - Montverde Academy	Greenville FC	(United States) North Carolina FC
34	Houston Dynamo	(United States) Luka Prpa	MF	Marquette	Big East	Chicago Magic PSG	Chicago FC United	(United States) Rio Grande Valley FC
35	Seattle Sounders FC (Note: No. 35: Montreal Impact → Chicago Fire → Seattle Sounders FC. November 26, 2019: Seattle Sounders FC acquired a second-round selection in the 2020 SuperDraft and goalkeeper Stefan Cleveland from Chicago Fire FC in exchange for a first-round selection in the 2020 SuperDraft. On August 7, 2019, Chicago had acquired this second-round selection in the 2020 SuperDraft, midfielder Micheal Azira, and the No. 6 spot in the MLS Allocation Order from Montreal Impact in exchange defender Jorge Corrales and the No. 1 spot in the MLS Allocation Order. Montreal used its No. 1 allocation ranking to sign midfielder Ballou Tabla on loan for the remainder of the 2019 MLS season. Chicago will also receive $75,000 in 2020 general allocation money from Montreal if Tabla is on an MLS roster for the 2020 season.)	(England) Danny Reynolds	DF	UNC Wilmington	CAA	Cheltenham Town	Brazos Valley Cavalry	(United States) Tacoma Defiance
36	New York Red Bulls (Note: No. 36: Chicago Fire → New York Red Bulls. January 11, 2019: New York Red Bulls acquired a second-round selection in the 2019 MLS SuperDraft from Chicago Fire FC in exchange for the MLS rights to midfielder Amando Moreno. Per the 2020 Superdraft tracker posted online by MLS, this second-round selection in the 2020 SuperDraft was also included in the trade although it was not publicly announced.)	(United States) Wallis Lapsley	GK	UC Davis	Big West	Seattle United	Des Moines Menace	(United States) New York Red Bulls II
37	Colorado Rapids (Note: No. 37: Colorado Rapids → Sporting Kansas City → Colorado Rapids. May 8, 2019: Colorado Rapids acquired a second-round selection in the 2020 SuperDraft, an international roster spot for 2019, $50,000 in targeted allocation money, and defender Abdul Rwatubyaye from Sporting Kansas City in exchange for midfielder Benny Feilhaber and salary budget considerations. The clubs also swapped positions in the MLS Waiver Order. On February 8, 2018, Kansas City had acquired this second-round selection in the 2020 SuperDraft from Colorado in exchange for goalkeeper Andrew Dykstra.)	(Germany) Robin Afamefuna	DF	Virginia	ACC	Borussia Mönchengladbach	Long Island Rough Riders	(Germany) Bonner SC
38	San Jose Earthquakes	(Jamaica) Jon Bell	DF	UMBC	America East	D.C. United	FC Baltimore Christos	(United States) New England Revolution II
39	Orlando City SC (Note: No. 39: New England Revolution → Orlando City. November 25, 2019: Orlando City SC acquired a second-round selection in the 2020 SuperDraft and the No. 11 pick in the 2019 MLS End-of-Year Waiver Draft from New England Revolution in exchange for the No. 3 pick in the 2019 MLS End-of-Year Waiver Draft. New England used the No. 3 pick to select goalkeeper Jeff Caldwell.)	(United States) Jonathan Dean	DF	UCF	American	Georgia United	—N/a	(United States) Birmingham Legion
40	FC Dallas	(Spain) Manuel Ferriol	MF	James Madison	CAA	Levante	Long Island Rough Riders	(United States) FC Tucson
41	New York Red Bulls	(England) Deri Corfe	FW	Wright State	Horizon	Manchester City	Ocean City Nor'easters	(United States) New York Red Bulls II
42	D.C. United (Note: No. 42: Portland Timbers → D.C. United. January 23, 2018: D.C. United acquired a second-round selection in the 2020 SuperDraft, an international roster spot for 2018, $100,000 in general allocation money, and $100,000 in targeted allocation money from Portland Timbers in exchange for the MLS rights to midfielder Eryk Williamson.)	(United States) Josh Fawole	FW	Loyola (MD)	Patriot	Baltimore Celtic	The Villages SC	(United States) Loudoun United
43	New England Revolution (Note: No. 43: D.C. United → New England Revolution. January 11, 2019: New England Revolution acquired a second-round selection in the 2020 SuperDraft from D.C. United in exchange for a second-round selection in the 2019 MLS SuperDraft, a third-round selection in the 2020 SuperDraft, and a fourth-round selection in the 2020 SuperDraft. The traded picks are all natural selections.)	(United States) Keegan Meyer	GK	High Point	Big South	Baltimore Celtic	Ocean City Nor'easters	(United States) New England Revolution II
44	Orlando City SC (Note: No. 44: Minnesota United → Orlando City. January 10, 2019: Orlando City SC acquired a second-round selection in the 2020 SuperDraft and the No. 4 spot in the MLS Waiver Order from Minnesota United FC in exchange for two fourth-round selections in the 2019 MLS SuperDraft and the No. 1 spot in the MLS Waiver Order. Minnesota used its waiver spot to sign midfielder Osvaldo Alonso.)	(United States) Austin Aviza	GK	Providence	Big East	New England Revolution	—N/a	(United States) Orlando City B
45	LA Galaxy	(Northern Ireland) Tom Smart	DF	Akron	MAC	West Bromwich Albion	FC Golden State	
46	Real Salt Lake	(United States) Michael Wetungu	DF	Michigan State	Big Ten	Vardar SC	Flint City Bucks	(United States) Real Monarchs
47	Columbus Crew (Note: No. 47: Philadelphia Union → Columbus Crew. July 19, 2019: Columbus Crew SC acquired a second-round selection in the 2020 SuperDraft from Philadelphia Union in exchange for goalkeeper Joe Bendik. Columbus also will receive $50,000 in general allocation money for the 2020 MLS season if Bendik meets certain performance conditions.)	(Austria) Remi Prieur	GK	Saint Mary's	WCC	San Jose Earthquakes	Portland Timbers U23s	(United States) Sporting Kansas City II
48	New York City FC	(France) Félicien Dumas	DF	Notre Dame	ACC	Home United	Chicago FC United	(United States) Indy Eleven
49	Columbus Crew (Note: No. 49: Atlanta United → Columbus Crew. May 7, 2019: Columbus Crew SC acquired a second-round selection in the 2020 SuperDraft and $100,000 in general allocation money from Atlanta United FC in exchange for midfielder Justin Meram. Columbus also retains a percentage of any future transfer fee should Atlanta transfer Meram outside of MLS.)	(United States) Danny Griffin	MF	Providence	Big East	Oakwood SC	—N/a	(United States) Pittsburgh Riverhounds SC
50	Los Angeles FC	(Republic of Ireland) Jack Hallahan	MF	Michigan	Big Ten	West Bromwich Albion	AFC Ann Arbor	(Cyprus) PAEEK
51	Toronto FC	(Denmark) Simon Wæver	DF	Indiana	Big Ten	Lyngby BK	—N/a	(Denmark) B.93
52	Seattle Sounders FC	(Germany) Timo Mehlich	MF	UNLV	WAC	Borussia Mönchengladbach	OKC Energy U23	(United States) Rio Grande Valley FC

=== Round 3 ===
P	MLS team	Player	Pos.	College	Conference	Academy team	Amateur team	Signed
53	FC Cincinnati (Note: No. 53: Inter Miami → FC Cincinnati. November 11, 2019: FC Cincinnati acquired a third-round selection in the 2020 SuperDraft, $50,000 in general allocation money, and the No. 26 selection in Stage One of the 2019 MLS Re-Entry Draft from Inter Miami CF in exchange for midfielder Victor Ulloa and the No. 1 selection in Stage One of the 2019 MLS Re-Entry Draft. The traded pick is Miami's natural selection.)	(Benin) Joris Ahlinvi	MF	Indiana	Big Ten	Valenciennes	Reading United	(United States) New Mexico United
54	Nashville SC	(Saint Vincent and the Grenadines) Shak Adams	FW	Florida Gulf Coast	Atlantic Sun	Tennessee SC	Seattle Sounders FC U-23	(United States) FC Tucson
55	Vancouver Whitecaps FC (Note: No. 55: FC Cincinnati → Vancouver Whitecaps FC. December 9, 2018: Vancouver Whitecaps FC acquired a third-round selection in the 2020 SuperDraft from FC Cincinnati in exchange for goalkeeper Spencer Richey. The traded pick is Cincinnati's natural selection.)	PASS	—N/a	—N/a	—N/a	—N/a	—N/a	—N/a
56	Montreal Impact (Note: No. 56: Vancouver Whitecaps FC → Montreal Impact. December 9, 2018: Montreal Impact acquired a third-round selection in the 2020 SuperDraft and $50,000 in targeted allocation money from Vancouver Whitecaps FC in exchange for goalkeeper Maxime Crépeau. The traded pick is Vancouver's natural selection.)	PASS	—N/a	—N/a	—N/a	—N/a	—N/a	—N/a
57	Orlando City SC	(United States) Nick O'Callaghan	DF	FIU	C-USA	Orlando City SC	SIMA Águilas	(United States) Orlando City B
58	Sporting Kansas City	(United States) Jaret Townsend	MF	Washington	Pac-12	Real Colorado	Crossfire Redmond	(United States) Sporting Kansas City II
59	Columbus Crew	(Japan) Ryo Shimazaki	DF	VCU	A-10	Kawasaki Frontale	South Georgia Tormenta FC 2	(United States) New England Revolution II
60	Montreal Impact (Note: No. 60: Houston Dynamo → Montreal Impact. December 17, 2018: Montreal Impact acquired a third-round selection in the 2020 SuperDraft from Houston Dynamo in exchange for defender Chris Duvall. The traded pick is Houston's natural selection.)	PASS	—N/a	—N/a	—N/a	—N/a	—N/a	—N/a
61	Montreal Impact	PASS	—N/a	—N/a	—N/a	—N/a	—N/a	—N/a
62	New York Red Bulls (Note: No. 62: Chicago Fire → FC Cincinnati → New York Red Bulls. August 8, 2019: New York Red Bulls acquired a third-round selection in the 2020 SuperDraft from FC Cincinnati in exchange for a loan of midfielder Derrick Etienne for the remainder of the 2019 season and an option to purchase Etienne at the end of the loan. On August 1, 2019, FC Cincinnati had acquired this third-round selection in the 2020 SuperDraft and the MLS rights to defender Andrew Gutman from Chicago Fire FC in exchange for $50,000 in general allocation money. Chicago could also receive up to an additional $150,000 in general allocation money if Gutman meets certain performance-based metrics. Chicago will also receive a percentage of any future revenue should Cincinnati transfer or loan Gutman outside of MLS. The traded pick is Chicago's natural selection.)	(Greece) Stavros Zarokostas	FW	Rhode Island	A-10	La Salle Academy	Rhode Island Reds	(United States) Charleston Battery
63	Colorado Rapids	PASS	—N/a	—N/a	—N/a	—N/a	—N/a	—N/a
64	San Jose Earthquakes	PASS	—N/a	—N/a	—N/a	—N/a	—N/a	—N/a
65	D.C. United (Note: No. 65: New England Revolution → D.C. United. January 11, 2019: D.C. United acquired a third-round selection in the 2020 SuperDraft, a fourth-round selection in the 2020 SuperDraft, and a second-round selection in the 2019 MLS SuperDraft from New England Revolution in exchange for a second-round selection in the 2020 SuperDraft. The traded picks are all natural selections.)	(United States) Andrew Verdi	GK	Michigan	Big Ten	Philadelphia Union	West Chester United SC	
66	FC Dallas	(United States) Derek Waldeck	MF	Stanford	Pac-12	Real So Cal	Southern California Seahorses	(United States) North Texas SC
67	New York Red Bulls	(United States) Barry Sharifi	MF	Loyola (MD)	Patriot	New York Red Bulls	New York Red Bulls U-23	(United States) New York Red Bulls II
68	Portland Timbers	(Canada) Zac McGraw	DF	West Point	Patriot	FC Golden State	—N/a	(United States) Portland Timbers
69	D.C. United	PASS	—N/a	—N/a	—N/a	—N/a	—N/a	—N/a
70	Houston Dynamo (Note: No. 70: Minnesota United → Houston Dynamo. November 13, 2019: Houston Dynamo acquired a third-round selection in the 2020 SuperDraft and midfielder Darwin Quintero from Minnesota United FC in exchange for midfielder Marlon Hairston, $150,000 in 2020 general allocation money, $150,000 in 2020 targeted allocation money, $150,000 in 2021 general allocation money, and $150,000 in 2021 targeted allocation money.)	(United States) Duncan Turnbull	GK	Notre Dame	ACC	Sockers FC	—N/a	(England) Portsmouth
71	LA Galaxy	PASS	—N/a	—N/a	—N/a	—N/a	—N/a	—N/a
72	Real Salt Lake	PASS	—N/a	—N/a	—N/a	—N/a	—N/a	—N/a
73	Philadelphia Union	PASS	—N/a	—N/a	—N/a	—N/a	—N/a	—N/a
74	New York City FC	(United States) Parker Siegfried	GK	Ohio State	Big Ten	Columbus Crew	Asheville City SC	(United States) South Georgia Tormenta
75	Atlanta United FC	(United States) Phillip Goodrum	FW	UNC Wilmington	CAA	Colorado Rapids	Brazos Valley Cavalry	(United States) Atlanta United 2
76	Los Angeles FC	(Spain) Jorge González	MF	SIUE	MAC	—N/a	Chicago FC United	(United States) Portland Timbers 2
77	Toronto FC	PASS	—N/a	—N/a	—N/a	—N/a	—N/a	—N/a
78	Seattle Sounders FC	(Canada) Julian Avila-Good	MF	Seattle	WAC	Winnipeg South End United	OSA FC	

=== Round 4 ===
P	MLS team	Player	Pos.	College	Conference	Academy team	Amateur team	Signed
79	FC Dallas (Note: No. 79: Inter Miami → FC Dallas. January 9, 2020: FC Dallas acquired a fourth-round selection in the 2020 SuperDraft from Inter Miami CF in exchange for the MLS rights to goalkeeper Dylan Castanheira.)	(Norway) Anders Engebretsen	FW	Saint Mary's	WCC	Skeid	—N/a	(United States) North Texas SC
80	Nashville SC	(United States) Luke Haakenson	MF	Creighton	Big East	Shattuck-Saint Mary's	Minneapolis City SC	(United States) Nashville SC
81	LA Galaxy (Note: No. 81: FC Cincinnati → LA Galaxy. December 12, 2018: LA Galaxy acquired a fourth-round selection in the 2020 SuperDraft and potentially $50,000 in general allocation money (subject to performance metrics) from FC Cincinnati in exchange for the MLS rights to defender Zico Bailey. The traded pick is Cincinnati's natural selection.)	PASS	—N/a	—N/a	—N/a	—N/a	—N/a	—N/a
82	Vancouver Whitecaps FC	PASS	—N/a	—N/a	—N/a	—N/a	—N/a	—N/a
83	Orlando City SC	PASS	—N/a	—N/a	—N/a	—N/a	—N/a	—N/a
84	Sporting Kansas City	(United States) James Kasak	DF	Virginia Tech	ACC	—N/a	North Carolina FC U23	(United States) Chattanooga FC
85	Columbus Crew	PASS	—N/a	—N/a	—N/a	—N/a	—N/a	—N/a
86	Houston Dynamo	(Saint Vincent and the Grenadines) Kyle Edwards	FW	UTRGV	WAC	System 3	Brazos Valley Cavalry	(United States) Rio Grande Valley FC
87	Colorado Rapids (Note: No. 87: Montreal Impact → Colorado Rapids. August 8, 2018: Colorado Rapids acquired a fourth-round selection in the 2020 SuperDraft from Montreal Impact in exchange for midfielder Micheal Azira.)	PASS	—N/a	—N/a	—N/a	—N/a	—N/a	—N/a
88	Minnesota United FC (Note: No. 88: Chicago Fire → Minnesota United. September 3, 2019: Minnesota United FC acquired a fourth-round selection in the 2020 SuperDraft and $50,000 in 2020 general allocation money from Chicago Fire FC in exchange for $50,000 in 2019 general allocation money.)	(England) Matt Bentley	FW	Missouri State	MVC	—N/a	GPS Portland Phoenix	(United States) Richmond Kickers
89	Colorado Rapids	PASS	—N/a	—N/a	—N/a	—N/a	—N/a	—N/a
90	San Jose Earthquakes	PASS	—N/a	—N/a	—N/a	—N/a	—N/a	—N/a
91	D.C. United (Note: No. 91: New England Revolution → D.C. United. January 11, 2019: D.C. United acquired a fourth-round selection in the 2020 SuperDraft, a third-round selection in the 2020 SuperDraft, and a second-round selection in the 2019 MLS SuperDraft from New England Revolution in exchange for a second-round selection in the 2020 SuperDraft. The traded picks are all natural selections.)	PASS	—N/a	—N/a	—N/a	—N/a	—N/a	—N/a
92	FC Dallas	(United States) Aidan Megally	MF	Loyola Chicago	MVC	Sockers FC	Chicago FC United	
93	New York Red Bulls	(United States) Niko Petridis	MF	St. John's	Big East	Beachside SC	—N/a	
94	Portland Timbers	(Norway) Joergen Oland	DF	Fordham	Atlantic 10	Strømsgodset	Long Island Rough Riders	
95	D.C. United	PASS	—N/a	—N/a	—N/a	—N/a	—N/a	—N/a
96	Minnesota United FC	(Jamaica) Andrew Booth	MF	FIU	C-USA	Kendall SC	Treasure Coast Tritons	(United States) Greenville Triumph
97	LA Galaxy	PASS	—N/a	—N/a	—N/a	—N/a	—N/a	—N/a
98	Real Salt Lake	PASS	—N/a	—N/a	—N/a	—N/a	—N/a	—N/a
99	Philadelphia Union	PASS	—N/a	—N/a	—N/a	—N/a	—N/a	—N/a
100	New York City FC	PASS	—N/a	—N/a	—N/a	—N/a	—N/a	—N/a
101	Philadelphia Union (Note: No. 101: Atlanta United → Philadelphia Union. December 11, 2016: Philadelphia Union acquired a fourth-round selection in the 2020 SuperDraft from Atlanta United FC in exchange for forward Kevin Kratz. The traded pick is Atlanta's natural selection.)	PASS	—N/a	—N/a	—N/a	—N/a	—N/a	—N/a
102	Los Angeles FC	(Morocco) Younes Boudadi	DF	Creighton	Big East	Club Brugge	Laredo Heat	(United States) Reno 1868
103	Toronto FC	PASS	—N/a	—N/a	—N/a	—N/a	—N/a	—N/a
104	Chicago Fire FC (Note: No. 104: Seattle Sounders FC → Chicago Fire. December 28, 2018: Chicago Fire FC acquired a fourth-round selection in the 2020 SuperDraft from Seattle Sounders FC in exchange for defender Jonathan Campbell. The traded pick is Seattle's natural selection.)	PASS	—N/a	—N/a	—N/a	—N/a	—N/a	—N/a

USL League Two - not a professional contract

== Trades ==
Round 1

Round 2

Round 3

Round 4

== Notable undrafted players ==
=== Homegrown players ===
Original MLS team	Player	Position	College	Conference	Notes	Ref.
Chicago Fire FC	(United States) Mauricio Pineda	MF	North Carolina	ACC	All-ACC First-Team	
Columbus Crew	(United States) Sebastian Berhalter	MF	North Carolina	ACC		
Columbus Crew	(United States) Aidan Morris	MF	Indiana	Big Ten	TDS Freshman of the Year	
FC Dallas	(United States) Eddie Munjoma	DF	SMU	American	AAC Defender of the Year	
Orlando City SC	(United States) David Loera	MF	NC State	ACC	All-ACC Second-Team	
Portland Timbers	(United States) Blake Bodily	MF	Washington	Pac-12	Pac-12 Player of the Year	
Real Salt Lake	(United States) Milan Iloski	FW	UCLA	Pac-12	All-Pac-12 First-Team	
San Jose Earthquakes	(United States) Drake Callender	GK	California	Pac-12	Traded to Inter Miami CF	

=== Players who signed outside of MLS ===
This is a list of undrafted players who signed in leagues outside of MLS.

Player	Nat.	Position	College	Conference	Team	League	Notes	Ref.
Stanley Alves	BRA	FW	UMass Lowell	America East	Richmond Kickers	USL League One		
Samuel Biek	GER	DF	Western Michigan Broncos	Mid-American	FC Tucson	USL League One		
Evan Conway	USA	FW	Milwaukee	Horizon	Union Omaha	USL League One		
Jake Crull	AUT	FW	Spring Arbor	Crossroads (NAIA)	Union Omaha	USL League One		
Victor Falck	SWE	MF	UC Irvine	Big West	Richmond Kickers	USL League One		
Blake Malone	USA	DF	North Carolina	ACC	Orange County SC	USL Championship		
Luca Mayr-Fälten	AUT	MF	South Carolina	C-USA	Tormenta	USL League One		
Christian Molina	SLV	MF	Northern Illinois	Mid-American	Union Omaha	USL League One		
Anthony Mwembia	FRA	GK	Bowling Green	Mid-American	Pittsburgh Riverhounds	USL Championship		
Baboucarr Njie	GAM	MF	NC Wesleyan	USA South (DIII)	Atlanta United 2	USL Championship		
Ford Parker	USA	GK	UC Irvine	Big West	Birmingham Legion	USL Championship		
Daniele Proch	ITA	FW	Duke	ACC	North Carolina FC	USL Championship		
Samson Sergi	USA	FW	Xavier	Big East	New Mexico United	USL Championship		
Daniel Steedman	SCO	MF	Virginia	ACC	Atlanta United 2	USL Championship		
Tim Trilk	USA	GK	Western Illinois	Summit	Chattanooga Red Wolves	USL League One		
Damià Viader	ESP	DF	Iowa Western	NJCAA	Union Omaha	USL League One		

== Summary ==
=== Selections by college athletic conference ===
Conference	Round 1	Round 2	Round 3	Round 4	Total
NCAA Division I conferences
ACC	8	6	1	1	16
America East	0	1	0	0	1
American	4	1	0	0	5
Atlantic 10	0	0	2	1	3
Atlantic Sun	0	0	1	0	1
Big East	3	3	0	3	9
Big South	0	1	0	0	1
Big Ten	3	3	3	0	9
Big West	1	1	0	0	2
CAA	0	2	1	0	3
Conference USA	2	1	1	1	5
Horizon	1	1	0	0	2
Mid-American	0	1	2	1	5
Missouri Valley	0	0	0	2	2
OVC	0	0	1	1	2
Pac-12	1	1	2	0	4
Patriot	0	1	2	1	1
WAC	1	1	1	1	4
West Coast	2	2	0	1	1
Passes
Pass	0	0	11	16	27

=== Schools with multiple draft selections ===
Selections	Schools
3	Clemson, FIU, Indiana, Virginia
2	Creighton, Georgetown, Marquette, Michigan, Michigan State, North Carolina, Notre Dame, Providence, Stanford, Syracuse, UCF, UNC Wilmington, Wake Forest
