= 2019 Stanford Cardinal men's soccer team =

American college soccer season

2019 Stanford Cardinal men's soccer

NCAA Tournament, College Cup
- Conference: Pac-12 Conference
- U. Soc. Coaches poll: No. 2
- TopDrawerSoccer.com: No. 4
- Record: 14–3–5 (6–2–2 Pac-12)
- Head coach: Jeremy Gunn (8th season)
- Assistant coaches: Oige Kennedy (4th season); Charles Rodriguez (4th season)
- Home stadium: Laird Q. Cagan Stadium

2019 Pac-12 Conference men's soccer standings
	Conf.					Overall
Team	W		L		T	W		L		T
No. 6 Washington †	9	–	2	–	0	16	–	4	–	0
No. 4 Stanford +	6	–	2	–	2	14	–	3	–	5
Oregon State	5	–	3	–	2	8	–	5	–	2
California +	4	–	4	–	2	8	–	7	–	3
UCLA	2	–	6	–	1	6	–	9	–	2
San Diego State	1	–	9	–	0	4	–	12	–	2
† – Conference champion + – Invited to the 2019 NCAA Tournament; As of 17 December 2019; Rankings from United Soccer Coaches

The 2019 Stanford Cardinal men's soccer team represented Stanford University during the 2019 NCAA Division I men's soccer season. They will be led by eight year head coach Jeremy Gunn. The Cardinal enter the season after coming up short of a fourth straight championship, losing to Akron in the quarterfinals 2-3 of the NCAA Tournament.

== Offseason ==
=== 2019 recruiting class ===
Name	Nat.	Hometown	Club	TDS rating
Carlo Agostinelli; FW	ENG	London, England	Harrow School	
Ousseni Bouda; FW	Burkina Faso	Ouagadougou, Burkina Faso	Black Rock FC	5/5 stars
Cameron Cilley; MF	USA	Alamo, CA	San Jose Earthquakes Academy	4/5 stars
Mark Fisher; MF	USA	Grand Blanc, MI	Michigan Wolves SC	3/5 stars
Keegan Hughes; DF	USA	Heath, OH	Crew SC academy	3/5 stars
Alex Rando; GK	USA	New York, NY	NYCFC Academy	3/5 stars
Gabe Segal; FW	USA	Bethesda, MD	Bethesda SC Academy	4/5 stars
Keegan Tingey; MF	USA	Danville, CA	San Jose Earthquakes Academy	3/5 stars

=== Departures ===
Name	Number	Pos.	Height	Weight	Year	Hometown	Reason for departure
Adam Mosharrafa	6	DF	6'2"	175	RS-Senior	Paradise Valley, AZ	Graduated
Charlie Furrer	20	GK	6'2"	185	RS-Junior	Georgetown, TX	Left team
Collin Liberty	21	DF	6'0"	170	RS-Senior	Van Nuys, CA	Graduated, signed with FC Golden State Force
Willy Miyamoto	28	MF	5'9"	150	Junior	Mission Viejo, CA	Left team
Eduardo Palacios Fabre	32	GK	6'4"	200	RS-Senior	Madrid, Spain	Graduated

== Roster ==
Note: Flags indicate national team as defined under FIFA eligibility rules; some limited exceptions apply. Players may hold more than one non-FIFA nationality.

No.	Pos.	Nation	Player
1	GK	ENG	Andrew Thomas
2	DF	USA	Andrew Aprahamian
3	DF	USA	Tanner Beason
4	MF	USA	Derek Waldeck
5	DF	USA	Keegan Hughes
6	MF	USA	Mark Fisher
7	MF	USA	Will Richmond
8	MF	USA	Jared Gilbey
9	FW	TUR	Arda Bulut
10	FW	USA	Charlie Wehan
11	FW	BFA	Ousseni Bouda
12	DF	USA	Ryan Ludwick
13	MF	JPN	Kei Tomozawa
14	FW	USA	Zach Ryan

No.	Pos.	Nation	Player
15	FW	USA	Rhys de Sota
16	MF	USA	Cam Cilley
17	FW	USA	Gabe Segal
18	DF	HKG	Tyler Shaver
19	FW	USA	Jack O'Brien
20	FW	ENG	Carlo Agostinelli
21	DF	USA	Keegan Tingey
22	MF	USA	Logan Panchot
23	MF	USA	Marc Joshua
24	MF	USA	Kyle Casey
25	MF	USA	Matthew Radzihovsky
30	GK	USA	Matt Frank
31	GK	USA	Kyle Orciuch
32	GK	USA	Alex Rando

== Schedule ==
=== Spring season ===
Win Draw Loss Upcoming fixture

August 20 Exh.	#5 Stanford	3–0	Saint Mary's	Stanford, CA
7:00 PM	O'Brien 66'; Bouda 75', 84'	Report		Stadium: Cagan Stadium

August 23 Exh.	#5 Stanford	1–0	Pacific	Stanford, CA
7:00 PM	Beason 38'	Report		Stadium: Cagan Stadium

=== Regular season ===
Win Draw Loss Upcoming fixture

August 30 1	Penn State	0–5	#5 Stanford	State College, PA
4:00 PM		Report	Richmond 11'; Beason 13'; Wehan 63'; Bouda 68'; O'Brein (yellow card) 77'; Frank (yellow card) 84'; Segal 84'	Stadium: Jeffrey Field; Attendance: 1,537; Referee: Sergio Gonzalez

September 2 2	#21 Akron	1–2	#5 Stanford	Akron, OH
4:00 PM	Egbo 46' (yellow card) 72'; Tojaga (yellow card) 49'	Report	Beason 13'; Panchot (yellow card) 85'; Ryan 89'	Stadium: FirstEnergy Stadium; Attendance: 3,617; Referee: Donovan Noocha

September 9 3	#4 Stanford	1–0	UC Irvine	Stanford, CA
7:00 PM	Ryan 13'; Aprahamian (yellow card) 85'	Report		Stadium: Cagan Stadium; Attendance: 918; Referee: Michael Lavergne

September 13 4	#3 Stanford	2–0	Denver	Stanford, CA
7:00 PM	Beason 23'; Thomas (yellow card) 26'; Ryan 28'; Hughes (yellow card) 73'; Joshua (yellow card) 86'	Report	Heller (yellow card) 23'	Stadium: Cagan Stadium; Attendance: 2,304; Referee: Matthew Buckman

September 15 5	#3 Stanford	3–0	American	Stanford, CA
1:00 PM	Bouda 22'; Waldeck 55'; Segal 82'	Report	Dimitrijević (yellow card) 1'; Massaro (yellow card) 75'	Stadium: Cagan Stadium; Attendance: 813; Referee: Turan Ozdemir

September 20 6 (Big Clasico)	California	1–2	Stanford	Berkeley, CA
4:30 PM	Estrada 8'; Carrillo-Weisenburger (yellow card) 22'; Lonergan (yellow card) 71'	Report	Bulut 40'; Segal 70'	Stadium: Edwards Stadium; Attendance: 817; Referee: Bernard Hosu

September 24 7 (Bill Walsh Legacy Game)	#2 Stanford	3–0	San Jose State	Stanford, CA
7:00 PM	Bouda 52'; Waldeck 54'; Beason (yellow card) 58'; Segal 65'	Report		Stadium: Cagan Stadium; Attendance: 891; Referee: Eric Ehrhardt

September 28 8	#18 UC Santa Barbara	3–3 (a.e.t.)	#2 Stanford	Santa Barbara, CA
7:00 PM	Michael (yellow card) 11' (goal) 63'; Ballard-McBride 15'; Baynham 20'; Restrepo (yellow card) 105'	Report	Panchot (yellow card) 24'; Bulut 43'; Hughes 48'; Wehan 85'	Stadium: Harder Stadium; Attendance: 3,812; Referee: Bernard Hosu

October 3 9	#1 Stanford	1–2 (a.e.t.)	#10 Washington	Stanford, CA
5:00 PM	Aprahamian (yellow card) 18'; Ryan 48'; Hughes (yellow card) 54'; Ludwick (yellow card) 66'; Panchot (yellow card) 93'	Report	Miglietti 16'; Townsend (yellow card) 48'; Kleemann (yellow card) 68'; Meek 105'	Stadium: Cagan Stadium; Attendance: 1,019; Referee: Rene Nunez

October 6 10	#2 Stanford	1-1 (a.e.t.)	Oregon State	Stanford, CA
12:00 PM	Bouda (yellow card) 51'; Panchot (red card) 72'; Waldeck 73'; Hughes (yellow card) 99'	Report	Walker 68'; Strenov (yellow card) 73'; Yeates (yellow card) 73'; Deniel (yellow card) 76'	Stadium: Cagan Stadium; Attendance: 1,298; Referee: Baldomero Toledo

October 10 11	UCLA	0-1	#7 Stanford	Los Angeles, CA
8:00 PM	Soria (yellow card) 53'	Report	Cilley (yellow card) 63'; Wehan 81'	Stadium: Wallis Annenberg Stadium; Attendance: 1,742; Referee: Luis Guardia

October 13 12	San Diego State	0-1	#7 Stanford	San Diego, CA
12:00 PM	Chavez (yellow card) 27'; Roux (yellow card) 29'; Clarke (yellow card) 41'; Hunter (yellow card) 65'	Report	Bouda 58'; Ludwick (yellow card) 83'	Stadium: SDSU Sports Deck; Attendance: 477; Referee: Younes Marrakchi

October 23 13	#5 Stanford	2-0	San Francisco	Stanford, CA
7:00 PM	Hughes 26'; Ryan 27'	Report	Charalaghi (yellow card); McNelis (yellow card); Kajitani (yellow card)	Stadium: Cagan Stadium; Attendance: 1,455; Referee: Chipalo Street

October 31 14	#5 Stanford	3-2	San Diego State	Stanford, CA
8:00 PM	Ryan (yellow card) 32' (goal) 81'; Segal 37'; Waldeck (yellow card) 72'; Bouda 76'	Report	Roux 19'; Vargas 41'; Weber (yellow card) 68'; Colonna (red card)	Stadium: Cagan Stadium; Attendance: 532; Referee: Jorge Luna Hernandez

November 3 15	#5 Stanford	1-0	UCLA	Stanford, CA
3:00 PM	Hughes (yellow card) 27'; Joshua 65'	Report	Reveno (yellow card) 25'	Stadium: Cagan Stadium; Attendance: 1,890; Referee: Josh Wilkens

November 7 16	Oregon State	0-0 (a.e.t.)	#5 Stanford	Corvallis, OR
12:00 PM	Crespo (yellow card) 57'; Sanchez (yellow card) 65'	Report	Redmond (yellow card) 31'; Gilbey (yellow card) 57'; Segal (yellow card) 79'; Waldeck (yellow card) 79'	Stadium: Paul Lorenz Field at Patrick Wayne Valley Stadium; Attendance: 477; Referee: Ricardo Salazar

November 10 17	#1 Washington	0-1	#5 Stanford	Seattle, WA
2:00 PM	Logan (yellow card) 56'; Ostrem (yellow card) 83'	Report	Segal 42'; Ludwick (yellow card) 52'; Cilley (yellow card) 56'	Stadium: Husky Soccer Stadium; Attendance: 1,462; Referee: Michael Lavergne

November 14 18	#4 Stanford	0-1	California	Stanford, CA
12:00 PM	Ludwick (yellow card) 46'	[Report]	Williamson (yellow card) 28' (goal) 56'; Estrada (yellow card) 59'; Grey (yellow card) 67'; Churchill (yellow card) 90'	Stadium: Cagan Stadium; Attendance: 1,525; Referee: Luis Guardia

=== NCAA Tournament ===
Win Draw Loss Upcoming fixture

November 24 Second Round	No. 7 Stanford	1–1 (a.e.t.) (2–1 p)	Seattle U	Stanford, CA
5:00 PM	Beason 61'	Report	Meza 75'	Stadium: Laird Q. Cagan Stadium; Attendance: 1,047; Referee: Bernhard Hosu
	Penalties
	Panchot (penalty scored); Bulut (penalty missed); Beason (penalty scored); Bouda (penalty missed)		(penalty missed) Morris; (penalty scored) Uderitz; (penalty missed) Meza; (penalty missed) Ortiz; (penalty missed) Ritchie

December 1 Third Round	No. 7 Stanford	2-1	No. 10 Virginia Tech	Stanford, CA
5:00 PM	Waldeck 54'; Hughes 80'	Report	Lennon 68'	Stadium: Laird Q. Cagan Stadium; Attendance: 664; Referee: Ian Anderson

December 6 Quarter-finals	No. 2 Clemson	1–1 (a.e.t.) (4-5 p)	No. 7 Stanford	Clemson, SC
3:00 PM	Seye 69'	Report	Beason 35'	Stadium: Riggs Field; Attendance: 3,267; Referee: Chris Penso
	Penalties
	Mbaye (penalty scored); Robinson (penalty missed); Nunez (penalty scored); Brighton (penalty scored); Agren (penalty scored); Fernandez (penalty missed)		Waldeck (penalty scored); Bulut (penalty scored); Beason (penalty scored); Bouda (penalty missed); Panchot (penalty scored); Joshua (penalty scored)

December 13 Semi-finals	No. 3 Georgetown	2-0	No. 7 Stanford	Cary, NC
3:00 PM	Zawadzki 4'; McCune 67'			Stadium: WakeMed Soccer Park

== Goals record ==
Rank	No.	Po.	Name	Regular season	NCAA Tournament	Total
1	14	FW	Zach Ryan	6	0	6
1	17	FW	Gabe Segal	6	0	6
3	11	FW	Ousseni Bouda	5	0	5
3	3	DF	Tanner Beason	3	2	5
5	4	MF	Derek Waldeck	3	1	4
6	10	FW	Charlie Wehan	3	0	3
6	5	DF	Keegan Hughes	2	1	3
8	9	FW	Arda Bulut	2	0	2
9	7	MF	Will Richmond	1	0	1
9	23	MF	Marc Joshua	1	0	1
Total				32	4	36

== Disciplinary record ==
No.	Po.	Name	Regular season			NCAA Tournament			Total		
No.	Po.	Name	Booked	(yellow card) (yellow-red card)	Sent off (straight red)	Booked	(yellow card) (yellow-red card)	Sent off (straight red)	Booked	(yellow card) (yellow-red card)	Sent off (straight red)
Total			0	0	0	0	0	0	0	0	0

== 2020 MLS Super Draft ==
Player	Team	Round	Pick #	Position
Tanner Beason	San Jose Earthquakes	1	12	DF
Derek Waldeck	FC Dallas	3	66	MF

== Awards and honors ==
Recipient	Award	Date	Ref.

== Rankings ==
Ranking movements Legend: ██ Increase in ranking ██ Decrease in ranking ( ) = First-place votes
	Week														
Poll	Pre	1	2	3	4	5	6	7	8	9	10	11	12	13	Final
United Soccer	5	5	4	3	2	1	2	7	5	5 (1)	5	4 (1)	7	4	4 (1)
Top Drawer Soccer	4	4	3	2	2	1	2	10	11	10	7	6	7	4	4
College Soccer News	5	5	4	2	2	1	2	5	5	5	5	5	4	9	9
Soccer America	4	4	1	1	1	1	2	4	4	2	2	2	2	2	7
