= 2018 Pac-12 Conference men's soccer season =

- League: NCAA Division I
- Sport: Soccer
- Duration: August 24, 2018 – November 9, 2018
- Teams: 6

2019 MLS SuperDraft
- Top draft pick: Frankie Amaya, UCLA
- Picked by: FC Cincinnati, 1st overall

Regular Season
- Champions: Stanford
- Runners-up: Oregon State
- Season MVP: Tanner Beason, Stanford
- Top scorer: Tanner Beason, Stanford

Pac-12 Conference men's soccer seasons
- ← 2017 2019 →

2018 Pac-12 Conference men's soccer standings
	Conf.					Overall
Team	W		L		T	W		L		T
No. 7 Stanford †	7	–	2	–	1	12	–	4	–	5
No. 23 Oregon State +	6	–	3	–	1	11	–	6	–	3
Washington +	6	–	4	–	0	12	–	7	–	1
UCLA +	5	–	5	–	0	10	–	9	–	0
California	3	–	7	–	0	7	–	9	–	2
San Diego State	2	–	8	–	0	7	–	10	–	1
† – Conference champion + – Invited to the 2018 NCAA Division I Men's Soccer Championship; As of December 11, 2018; Rankings from United Soccer Coaches

The 2018 Pac-12 Conference men's soccer season was the 19th season of men's varsity soccer in the conference. The season began on August 24, 2018 and concluded on November 9, 2018.

The four-time defending champions, Stanford, successfully defended their Pac-12 title. The Cardinal entered the NCAA Tournament as the three-time defending champions, but were eliminated by Akron in the quarterfinals. Joining Stanford in the tournament were Oregon State, Washington, and UCLA.

== Teams ==
=== Head coaches ===
Team	Head coach	Previous job	Years at school	Overall record	Record at school	Pac-12 record	NCAA Tournaments	NCAA College Cups	NCAA Titles
California	Kevin Grimes	SMU^{AC}	19	178–115–40 (.595)	178–115–40 (.595)	79–74–21 (.514)	11	0	0
Oregon State	Terry Boss	Virginia^{AC}	2	7–11–0 (.389)	7–11–0 (.389)	4–6–0 (.400)	0	0	0
San Diego State	Lev Kirshner	Rutgers^{AC}	19	147–158–57 (.485)	131–157–54 (.462)	34–63–24 (.380)	3	0	0
Stanford	Jeremy Gunn	Charlotte	7	271–86–49 (.728)	84–25–18 (.732)	38–12–10 (.717)	12	4	3

- AC = Assistant coach

=== Stadiums and locations ===
Team	Location	Stadium	Capacity
California Golden Bears	Berkeley, California	Edwards Stadium	22,000
Oregon State Beavers	Corvallis, Oregon	Lorenz Field	2,200
San Diego State Aztecs	San Diego, California	SDSU Sports Deck	1,000
Stanford Cardinal	Stanford, California	Cagan Stadium	4,000
UCLA Bruins	Los Angeles, California	Drake Stadium	7,000
Washington Huskies	Seattle, Washington	Husky Soccer Stadium	1,640

- Arizona, Arizona State, Colorado, Oregon, USC, Utah, and Washington State sponsor men's soccer at the club level and thus do not compete in the Pac-12 Conference. San Diego State is an associate member.

== Preseason ==
=== Recruiting ===
National Rankings
Team	CSN	TDS	Total signees
California			
Oregon State			
San Diego State			
Stanford			
UCLA			
Washington			

=== Preseason poll ===
The preseason poll will be released in August 2018.

	Team ranking	First place votes	Raw points
1.			
2.			
3.			
4.			
5.			
6.			

=== Preseason matches ===
Date	Time (PT)	Visiting team	Home team	Site	TV	Result	Attendance	Report
August 12	7:00 PM	San Diego State	UC Santa Barbara	Harder Stadium • Santa Barbara, CA		Cancelled		
August 13	7:00 PM	California	Cal State Fullerton	Titan Stadium • Fullerton, CA		T 0–0		
August 14	7:00 PM	Saint Mary's	Stanford	Laird Q. Cagan Stadium • Stanford, CA		W 2–1	0	
August 14	7:00 PM	Grand Canyon	UCLA	Drake Stadium • Los Angeles, CA		W 2–0		
August 16	7:30 PM	Seattle Pacific	Washington	Husky Soccer Stadium • Seattle, WA		W 5–0	350	
August 18	4:00 PM	Cal State Northridge	Stanford	Laird Q. Cagan Stadium • Stanford, CA		W 2–0	0	
August 18	5:00 PM	Saint Mary's	California	Edwards Stadium • Berkeley, CA		T 1–1		
August 18	5:30 PM	San Diego State	Point Loma Nazarene	PLNU Soccer Field • San Diego, CA		W 1–0	268	
August 19	7:00 PM	UC Irvine	UCLA	Wallis Annenberg Stadium • Los Angeles, CA				

== Regular season ==
Index to colors and formatting
Pac-12 member won
Pac-12 member lost
Pac-12 member tied
Pac-12 teams in **bold**

All times Pacific time.

=== Week 1 (Aug. 20–26) ===
Date	Time (PT)	Visiting team	Home team	Site	TV	Result	Attendance	Recap
August 24	4:30 PM	**#17 UCLA**	#18 Coastal Carolina	CCU Soccer Stadium • Conway, SC		**W** 4–0	500	
August 24	5:00 PM	Detroit Mercy	**#14 California**	Edwards Stadium • Berkeley, CA		**W** 2–1	0	
August 24	5:00 PM	Syracuse	**Oregon State**	Paul Lorenz Field • Corvallis, OR	P12N	**L** 1–2	401	
August 24	5:00 PM	San Jose State	**#1 Stanford**	Laird Q. Cagan Stadium • Stanford, CA	P12N	**T** 0–0 ^{2OT}	1,767	
August 24	7:30 PM	**San Diego State**	Santa Clara	Buck Shaw Stadium • Santa Clara, CA		**L** 0–2	678	
August 24	8:00 PM	Maryland	**#24 Washington**	Husky Soccer Stadium • Seattle, WA	P12N	**W** 2–0	1,354	
August 26	2:00 PM	Incarnate Word	**California**	Edwards Stadium • Berkeley, CA		**W** 1–0	240	
August 26	3:00 PM	**San Diego State**	San Francisco	Negoesco Stadium • San Francisco, CA		**T** 1–1 ^{2OT}	323	

=== Week 2 (Aug. 27-Sep. 2) ===
Date	Time (PT)	Visiting team	Home team	Site	TV	Result	Attendance	Report
August 27	6:00 PM	**#3 Washington**	New Mexico	UNM Soccer Complex • Albuquerque, NM	MWN	**W** 2–0	1,088	
August 27	7:00 PM	Sacramento State	**Oregon State**	Paul Lorenz Field • Corvallis, OR		**W** 2–1	347	
August 28	7:00 PM	San Diego	**#8 UCLA**	Wallis Annenberg Stadium • Los Angeles, CA	P12N	**W** 2–0	1,345	
August 30	6:00 PM	**#3 Washington**	#19 Denver	CIBER Field • Denver, CO	UDTV	**L** 2–3 ^{2OT}	588	
August 31	4:30 PM	**#10 Stanford**	Maryland	Ludwig Field • College Park, MD	FS1	**T** 0–0 ^{2OT}	5,802	
August 31	6:00 PM	Xavier	**Oregon State**	Paul Lorenz Field • Corvallis, OR		**T** 0–0 ^{2OT}	523	
August 31	7:30 PM	**#14 California**	#17 Pacific	Knoles Field • Stockton, CA		**L** 1–2 ^{OT}	1,238	
September 1	7:00 PM	Army	**San Diego State**	SDSU Sports Deck • San Diego, CA		**L** 1–2	742	
September 2	7:00 PM	San Francisco	**#8 UCLA**	Wallis Annenberg Stadium • Los Angeles, CA		**L** 0–1	965	

=== Week 3 (Sep. 3–9) ===
Date	Time (PT)	Visiting team	Home team	Site	TV	Result	Attendance	Report
September 3	10:00 AM	**Oregon State**	Penn State	Jeffrey Field • State College, PA		**W** 1–0	859	
September 3	10:00 AM	**#25 Stanford**	#20 Georgetown	Shaw Field • Washington, DC		**T** 1–1 ^{2OT}	1,833	
September 3	7:00 PM	**#23 Washington**	Gonzaga	Luger Field • Spokane, WA		**W** 3–0	1,890	
September 6	4:30 PM	Sacramento State	**California**	Avaya Stadium • San Jose, CA		**W** 6–2	152	
September 7	7:00 PM	LIU Brooklyn	**San Diego State**	SDSU Sports Deck • San Diego, CA		**W** 2–1	236	
September 7	7:00 PM	Cal State Bakersfield	**Oregon State**	Paul Lorenz Field • Corvallis, OR		**W** 3–1	389	
September 7	7:00 PM	**#25 Stanford**	#16 San Francisco	Negoesco Stadium • San Francisco, CA		**W** 2–0	1,529	
September 7	7:30 PM	Cal State Northridge	**#23 Washington**	Husky Soccer Stadium • Seattle, WA	UWTV-2	**W** 2–1	458	
September 8	9:00 AM	**UCLA**	Maryland	Ludwig Field • College Park, MD	BTN	**W** 1–0	2,793	
September 9	2:00 PM	UC Riverside	**California**	Edwards Stadium • Berkeley, CA		**T** 0–0 ^{2OT}	280	
September 9	4:30 PM	#14 Akron	**#23 Washington**	Husky Soccer Stadium • Seattle, WA	P12N	**W** 2–0	900	
September 9	5:00 PM	UC Irvine	**San Diego State**	SDSU Sports Deck • San Diego, CA		**W** 2–1 ^{OT}	219	

=== Week 4 (Sep. 10–16) ===
Date	Time (PT)	Visiting team	Home team	Site	TV	Result	Attendance
September 10	7:00 PM	#13 UC Davis	**Oregon State**	Paul Lorenz Field • Corvallis, OR		**T** 1–1 ^{2OT}	353
September 12	7:00 PM	Omaha	**#23 UCLA**	Wallis Annenberg Stadium • Los Angeles, CA		**W** 2–1	432
September 14	5:00 PM	Delaware	**California**	Edwards Stadium • Berkeley, CA	P12N	**W** 2–1	183
September 14	7:00 PM	American	**Oregon State**	Paul Lorenz Field • Corvallis, OR		**W** 3–2	328
September 14	7:00 PM	Brown	**San Diego State**	SDSU Sports Deck • San Diego, CA		**W** 2–0	414
September 14	7:00 PM	#19 UMass Lowell	**#25 Stanford**	Laird Q. Cagan Stadium • Stanford, CA	P12N	**W** 1–0	761
September 14	7:30 PM	**#16 Washington**	#15 Portland	Merlo Field • Portland, OR	THEW	**L** 0–1	3,151
September 16	1:00 PM	Delaware	**#25 Stanford**	Laird Q. Cagan Stadium • Stanford, CA	P12N	**W** 3–0	668
September 16	2:00 PM	#19 UMass Lowell	**California**	Edwards Stadium • Berkeley, CA		**T** 1–1 ^{2OT}	221
September 16	7:00 PM	Cal State Northridge	**#23 UCLA**	Wallis Annenberg Stadium • Los Angeles, CA		**L** 1–2	751

=== Week 5 (Sep. 17–23) ===
Date	Time (PT)	Visiting team	Home team	Site	TV	Result	Attendance
September 20	7:00 PM	Pacific	**#21 Stanford**	Laird Q. Cagan Stadium • Stanford, CA	P12N	**L** 0–1	1,556
September 21	7:00 PM	**Oregon State**	#13 Portland	Merlo Field • Portland, OR		**L** 1–2	1,607
September 22	7:00 PM	**UCLA**	UC Santa Barbara	Harder Stadium • Santa Barbara, CA		**L** 1–3	5,235
September 22	7:00 PM	**California**	Santa Clara	Buck Shaw Stadium • Santa Clara, CA		**L** 2–3 ^{2OT}	1,061
September 23	5:00 PM	Seattle U	**Washington**	Husky Soccer Stadium • Seattle, WA	P12N	**L** 0–2	2,994

=== Week 6 (Sep. 24–30) ===
Date	Time (PT)	Visiting team	Home team	Site	TV	Result	Attendance
September 24	7:00 PM	UNLV	San Diego State	SDSU Sports Deck • San Diego, CA		**W** 2–1	414
September 27	3:00 PM	**UCLA**	California	Edwards Stadium • Berkeley, CA	P12N	**UCLA** 2–1	199
September 27	5:00 PM	**San Diego State**	Stanford	Laird Q. Cagan Stadium • Stanford, CA	P12N	**STA 3**–0	749
September 29	6:00 PM	**Washington**	Oregon State	Paul Lorenz Field • Corvallis, OR		**OSU** 4–2	638
September 30	12:00 PM	**San Diego State**	California	Edwards Stadium • Berkeley, CA	P12N	**CAL** 1–0	192
September 30	5:00 PM	**UCLA**	Stanford	Laird Q. Cagan Stadium • Stanford, CA	P12N	**STA 3**–0	1,893

=== Week 7 (Oct. 1–7) ===
Date	Time (PT)	Visiting team	Home team	Site	TV	Result	Attendance
October 4	4:00 PM	**Oregon State**	**San Diego State**	SDSU Sports Deck • San Diego, CA		**SDSU** 1–0	184
October 4	8:00 PM	**Washington**	**UCLA**	Wallis Annenberg Stadium • Los Angeles, CA	P12N	**UCLA** 1–0	1,811
October 7	12:00 PM	**Washington**	**San Diego State**	SDSU Sports Deck • San Diego, CA		**UW** 2–1	381
October 7	12:00 PM	**Oregon State**	**UCLA**	Wallis Annenberg Stadium • Los Angeles, CA	P12N	**UCLA** 1–0	1,823
October 7	3:00 PM	**#18 Stanford**	**California**	Edwards Stadium • Berkeley, CA	P12N	**STA** 4–2	1,431

=== Week 8 (Oct. 8–14) ===
Date	Time (PT)	Visiting team	Home team	Site	TV	Result	Attendance
October 11	6:00 PM	**#10 Stanford**	**Oregon State**	Paul Lorenz Field • Corvallis, OR	P12N	**OSU** 1–0	496
October 11	7:00 PM	**California**	**Washington**	Husky Soccer Stadium • Seattle, WA	P12N	**UW** 1–0 ^{2OT}	846
October 13	7:00 PM	**#21 UCLA**	**San Diego State**	SDSU Sports Deck • San Diego, CA		**UCLA** 2–1 ^{OT}	1,002
October 14	3:00 PM	**California**	**Oregon State**	Paul Lorenz Field • Corvallis, OR	P12N	**OSU** 2–1	483
October 14	3:00 PM	**#10 Stanford**	**Washington**	Husky Soccer Stadium • Seattle, WA	P12N	**STA** 3–2 ^{2OT}	1,965

=== Week 9 (Oct. 15–21) ===
Date	Time (PT)	Visiting team	Home team	Site	TV	Result	Attendance
October 18	3:00 PM	**Washington**	**California**	Edwards Stadium • Berkeley, CA	P12N	**UW** 2–1	180
October 18	8:00 PM	**Oregon State**	**#12 Stanford**	Laird Q. Cagan Stadium • Stanford, CA	P12N	**T** 2–2 ^{2OT}	1,143
October 19	7:00 PM	**San Diego State**	San Diego	Torero Stadium • San Diego, CA		**W** 2–0	1,391
October 20	7:00 PM	Loyola Marymount	**#22 UCLA**	Wallis Annenberg Stadium • Los Angeles, CA		**W** 4–1	986
October 21	3:00 PM	**Oregon State**	**California**	Edwards Stadium • Berkeley, CA		**OSU** 1–0	353
October 21	3:00 PM	**Washington**	**#12 Stanford**	Laird Q. Cagan Stadium • Stanford, CA	P12N	**STA** 3–1	1,194

=== Week 10 (Oct. 22–28) ===
Date	Time (PT)	Visiting team	Home team	Site	TV	Result	Attendance
October 25	3:00 PM	**San Diego State**	**Oregon State**	Paul Lorenz Field • Corvallis, OR	P12N	**OSU** 1–0	286
October 25	8:00 PM	**UCLA**	**Washington**	Husky Soccer Stadium • Seattle, WA	P12N	**UW** 2–0	809
October 26	7:00 PM	#11 Denver	**#9 Stanford**	Laird Q. Cagan Stadium • Stanford, CA	SLTV	**W** 1–0 ^{2OT}	1,791
October 28	2:00 PM	**UCLA**	**Oregon State**	Paul Lorenz Field • Corvallis, OR	P12N	**OSU** 4–3 ^{OT}	449
October 28	4:00 PM	**San Diego State**	**Washington**	Husky Soccer Stadium • Seattle, WA	P12N	**UW** 2–0	482

=== Week 11 (Oct. 29-Nov. 4) ===
Date	Time (PT)	Visiting team	Home team	Site	TV	Result	Attendance
November 1	6:00 PM	Loyola Chicago	**#23 Washington**	Husky Soccer Stadium • Seattle, WA	UWTV-2	**W** 2–0	360
November 1	7:00 PM	**#6 Stanford**	**San Diego State**	SDSU Sports Deck • San Diego, CA		**STA** 2–0	494
November 1	7:00 PM	**California**	**UCLA**	Wallis Annenberg Stadium • Los Angeles, CA	P12N	**UCLA** 1–0	1,063
November 4	4:00 PM	**#6 Stanford**	**UCLA**	Wallis Annenberg Stadium • Los Angeles, CA	P12N	**STA** 1–0	2,104
November 4	4:30 PM	**California**	**San Diego State**	SDSU Sports Deck • San Diego, CA		**CAL** 2–0	542

=== Week 12 (Nov. 5-Nov. 11) ===
Date	Time (PT)	Visiting team	Home team	Site	TV	Result	Attendance
November 8	TBA	**San Diego State**	**UCLA**	Wallis Annenberg Stadium • Los Angeles, CA	P12N	**SDSU** 1–0	1,117
November 8	7:00 PM	**California**	**#6 Stanford**	Laird Q. Cagan Stadium • Stanford, CA	P12N	**CAL** 1–0	1,363
November 9	TBA	**#22 Oregon State**	**#25 Washington**	Husky Soccer Stadium • Seattle, WA	P12N	**UW** 2–0	895

== Rankings ==
=== National rankings ===
	Improvement in ranking
	Drop in ranking
RV	Received votes but were not ranked in Top 25
NV	No votes received

		Pre	Wk 1	Wk 2	Wk 3	Wk 4	Wk 5	Wk 6	Wk 7	Wk 8	Wk 9	Wk 10	Wk 11	Wk 12	Wk 13	Wk 14	Wk 15	Wk 16	Final
California	USC	RV	14	RV	NV	RV	NV	NV	NV	NV	NV	NV	NV	NV	No ranking				
California	TDS	NV	NV	21	NV	NV	NV	NV	NV	NV	NV	NV	NV	NV	NV	NV			
Oregon State	USC	NV	NV	NV	NV	NV	NV	NV	NV	RV	NV	RV	22	24	No ranking				
Oregon State	TDS	NV	NV	NV	NV	NV	NV	NV	NV	NV	NV	NV	25	RV	NV	RV			
San Diego State	USC	NV	NV	NV	NV	NV	NV	NV	NV	NV	NV	NV	NV	NV	No ranking				
San Diego State	TDS	NV	NV	NV	NV	NV	NV	NV	NV	NV	NV	NV	NV	NV	NV	NV			
Stanford	USC	1	10	25	RV	RV	RV	18	10	12	9	6	6	7	No ranking				
Stanford	TDS	1	1	4	24	24	22	NV	NV	21	25	RV	7	5	8	5			
UCLA	USC	RV	8	RV	11	23	RV	NV	21	22	NV	RV	NV	RV	No ranking				
UCLA	TDS	17	17	12	16	13	15	NV	NV	NV	NV	NV	RV	RV	RV	NV			
Washington	USC	24	3	23	9	16	RV	NV	NV	NV	RV	23	25	17	No ranking				
Washington	TDS	NV	RV	18	9	8	14	17	NV	NV	NV	NV	NV	NV	23	NV			

=== USC Far West regional ===
	Improvement in ranking
	Drop in ranking
RV	Received votes but were not ranked in Top 10
NV	No votes received

	Wk 1	Wk 2	Wk 3	Wk 4	Wk 5	Wk 6	Wk 7	Wk 8	Wk 9	Wk 10	Wk 11	Wk 12
California	3	10	7	9	NV	9	NV	NV	NV	NV	NV	NV
Oregon State	NV	NV	10	8	9	5	NV	10	NV	9	3	4
San Diego State	RV	NV	NV	NV	NV	NV	NV	NV	NV	NV	NV	NV
Stanford	4	NV	5	4	4	3	1	1	2	1	1	1
UCLA	2	4	2	6	NV	NV	3	3	NV	7	8	8
Washington	1	6	1	5	6	NV	6	NV	6	3	5	2

== Postseason ==
=== NCAA Tournament ===
Seed	Region	School	1st Round	2nd Round	3rd Round	Quarterfinals	Semifinals	Championship
—N/a	Winston-Salem	Oregon State	W, 2–1 vs. SMU – (Corvallis)	L, 0–1 vs. #8 Saint Mary's (Moraga)				
9	Winston-Salem	Stanford	BYE	W, 2–0 vs. UC Irvine – (Stanford)	T, 0–0 (W, 4–2 PK) vs. #8 Saint Mary's (Moraga)	L, 2–3 vs. Akron – (Stanford)		
—N/a	Lexington	UCLA	L, 0–1 vs. Portland – (Portland)					
—N/a	Lexington	Washington	T, 0–0 (L, 4–5 PK) vs. Lipscomb – (Seattle)					

== Player statistics ==
=== Goals ===
As of October 22, 2018

Rank	Player	Club	Goals
1	(Japan) Shinya Kadono	California	12
2	(Tanzania) Gloire Amanda	Oregon State	7
2	(United States) Amir Bashti	Stanford	7
2	(United States) Scott Menzies	Washington	7
5	(United States) Zach Ryan	Stanford	6
5	(United States) Tanner Beason	Stanford	6
7	(United States) Matt Hundley	UCLA	5
7	(Liberia) Mohammed Kamara	UCLA	5
7	(Benin) Don Tchilao	Oregon State	5
7	(United States) Kyle Coffee	Washington	5

=== Assists ===
As of October 22, 2018

Rank	Player	Club	Assists
1	(France) Sofiane Djeffal	Oregon State	6
1	(United States) Matt Hundley	UCLA	6
3	(United States) Tanner Beason	Stanford	5
3	(United States) Kyle Coffee	Washington	5
3	(Benin) Don Tchilao	Oregon State	5
3	(United States) Derek Waldeck	Toronto FC	5
7	(United States) Amir Bashti	Stanford	4
7	(United States) Charlie Wehan	Stanford	4

== Awards and honors ==
=== Player of the week honors ===
Following each week's games, Pac-12 conference officials select the player of the week.

Week	Player	School	Pos.
Week 1 (Aug. 26)	Matt Hundley	UCLA	MF
Week 2 (Sept. 2)	Don Tchilao	Oregon State	FW
Week 3 (Sept. 9)	Shinya Kadono	California	MF
Week 4 (Sept. 16)	Amir Bashti	Stanford	FW
Week 5 (Sept. 23)	Shinya Kadono	California	MF
Week 6 (Sept. 30)	Amir Bashti	Stanford	FW
Week 7 (Oct. 7)	Tanner Beason	Stanford	DF
Week 8 (Oct. 14)	Hassani Dotson	Oregon State	MF
Week 9 (Oct. 21)	Alex Cover	Oregon State	DF
Week 10 (Oct. 28)	Don Tchilao	Oregon State	FW
Week 11 (Nov. 4)	Tanner Beason	Stanford	DF
Week 12 (Nov. 11)	Jean-Julien Foe Nuphaus	California	DF

=== Postseason awards ===
2018 Pac-12 Men's Soccer individual awards
Award	Recipient(s)
Player of the Year	Tanner Beason, Stanford
Coach of the Year	Terry Boss, Oregon State
Defender of the Year	Tanner Beason, Stanford
Freshman of the Year	Sofiane Djeffal, Oregon State

All-Pac-12 First, Second, and Third Teams

Team	Goalkeeper	Defenders	Midfielders	Forwards
1st	(United States) Andrew Thomas, Stanford	(United States) Tanner Beason, Stanford (United States) Erik Holt, UCLA (United States) Quentin Pearson, Washington	(United States) Frankie Amaya, UCLA (United States) Amir Bashti, Stanford (United States) Blake Bodily, Washington (France) Sofiane Djeffal, Oregon State	(Japan) Shinya Kadono, California (United States) Damian German, San Diego State (United States) Kyle Coffee, Washington (Benin) Don Tchilao, Oregon State
2nd	(United States) Drake Callender, California	(United States) Matthew Powell, UCLA	(Ghana) Anderson Asiedu, UCLA (United States) Hassani Dotson, Oregon State (United States) Jared Gilbey, Stanford (United States) Matt Hundley, UCLA (United States) Pablo Pelaez, San Diego State	(Tanzania) Gloire Amanda, Oregon State (Israel) Sam Ebstein, California (Liberia) Mohammed Kamara, UCLA (Canada) Scott Menzies, Washington (United States) Zach Ryan, Stanford
3rd	(United States) Noah Texter, California	(United States) Ethan Bartlow, Washington (United States) Eric Diaz, Oregon State (United States) Joe Hafferty, Oregon State (United States) Eric Iloski, UCLA (United States) Sam Junqua, California	(United States) Corban Anderson, Washington (France) Logan Panchot, Stanford (United States) Dylan Teves, Washington	(United States) Milan Iloski, UCLA (United States) Charlie Wehan, Stanford

== MLS SuperDraft ==
=== Draft picks ===
Round	Pick #	MLS team	Player	Position	College	Other
1	1	FC Cincinnati	Frankie Amaya	Midfielder	UCLA	Generation Adidas
1	8	Houston Dynamo	Sam Junqua	Defender	California	
1	24	Atlanta United	Anderson Asiedu	Midfielder	UCLA	
2	31	Minnesota United	Hassani Dotson	Midfielder	Oregon State	
2	36	LA Galaxy	Don Tchilao	Midfielder	Oregon State	
2	41	Real Salt Lake	Kyle Coffee	Forward	Washington	
2	48	Atlanta United	Amir Bashti	Forward	Stanford	

=== Homegrown contracts ===
Original MLS team	Player	Position	College	Notes
Colorado Rapids	Matt Hundley	Midfielder	UCLA	
Real Salt Lake	Erik Holt	Forward	UCLA	

== See also ==
- 2018 NCAA Division I men's soccer season
- 2018 Pac-12 Conference women's soccer season
