= Battle of Seattle (disambiguation) =

Battle of Seattle is a colloquial name for the 1999 Seattle WTO protests, a period of civil unrest in Seattle, Washington, around a World Trade Organization conference.

Battle of Seattle may also refer to:

- Battle in Seattle, 2007 action-thriller film loosely based on the 1999 protests
- Battle of Seattle (1856), a Native American effort to expel non-natives from Seattle in 1856
- Battle for Seattle, the Seattle–Washington men's basketball rivalry.
