= 2018 Stanford Cardinal men's soccer team =

American college soccer season

2018 Stanford Cardinal men's soccer

Pac-12 Champions

NCAA tournament, L 2–3 vs. Akron
- Conference: Pac-12 Conference
- U. Soc. Coaches poll: No. 6
- TopDrawerSoccer.com: No. 5
- Record: 12–4–5 (7–2–1 Pac-12)
- Head coach: Jeremy Gunn (7th season)
- Assistant coaches: Oige Kennedy (3rd season); Charles Rodriguez (3rd season); Collin Audley (2nd season)
- Home stadium: Laird Q. Cagan Stadium

2018 Pac-12 Conference men's soccer standings
	Conf.					Overall
Team	W		L		T	W		L		T
No. 7 Stanford †	7	–	2	–	1	12	–	4	–	5
No. 23 Oregon State +	6	–	3	–	1	11	–	6	–	3
Washington +	6	–	4	–	0	12	–	7	–	1
UCLA +	5	–	5	–	0	10	–	9	–	0
California	3	–	7	–	0	7	–	9	–	2
San Diego State	2	–	8	–	0	7	–	10	–	1
† – Conference champion + – Invited to the 2018 NCAA Division I Men's Soccer Championship; As of December 11, 2018; Rankings from United Soccer Coaches

The 2018 Stanford Cardinal men's soccer team represented Stanford University during the 2018 NCAA Division I men's soccer season.

The Cardinal entered the season as the three-time defending national champions. This was the first team season since 1994 that a program enters the season as a three-time defending champion. In 1994, the Virginia Cavaliers men's soccer program entered the season as three-time defending national champions, where they would go on to win an unprecedented fourth-consecutive title.

== Background ==
Stanford enters the 2018 season as the three-time defending national champions.

== Offseason ==
=== Additions ===
Name	Number	Pos.	Height	Weight	Year	Hometown	Reason for departure
Matthew Radzihovsky	25	MF/DF	5'10"	174	Junior	Boulder, CO	Transfer from Colorado
Willy Miyamoto	28	MF	5'9"	150	Junior	Mission Viejo, CA	Joined team

=== Departures ===
Name	Number	Pos.	Height	Weight	Year	Hometown	Reason for departure
Nico Corti	1	GK	6'3"	195	RS Senior	Brussels, BEL	Graduated, signed with Rio Grande Valley FC Toros
Foster Langsdorf	2	FW	5'10"	150	Senior	Vancouver, WA	Graduated, signed with Portland Timbers as Homegrown player
Tomas Hilliard-Arce	4	DF	6'1"	175	Senior	Matthews, NC	Graduated, selected by LA Galaxy in 2018 MLS SuperDraft
Carson Vom Steeg	5	DF	6'0"	170	Freshman	Santa Barbara, CA	Transferred to UCSB
Bryce Marion	7	MF	5'8"	146	Senior	Cypress, TX	Graduated, signed with Rio Grande Valley FC Toros
Corey Baird	10	FW	5'11"	165	Senior	Escondido, CA	Graduated, signed with Real Salt Lake as Homegrown player
Drew Skundrich	12	MF	5'11"	165	Senior	Lancaster, PA	Graduated, selected by LA Galaxy in 2018 MLS SuperDraft

=== 2018 recruiting class ===
Name	Nat.	Hometown	Club	TDS Rating
Matt Frank; GK	USA	Bloomfield, MI	New York Red Bulls Academy	3/5 stars
Ryan Ludwick; DF	USA	York PA	PA Classics Academy	3/5 stars
Kyle Orciuch; GK	USA	Saint John, IN	Chicago Fire Academy 97	3/5 stars
Will Richmond; FW	USA	Piedmont, CA	San Jose Earthquakes Academy	3/5 stars
Tyler Shaver; DF	USA	Riverside, CT	New York City FC Academy	4/5 stars

== Roster ==
Note: Flags indicate national team as defined under FIFA eligibility rules; some limited exceptions apply. Players may hold more than one non-FIFA nationality.

No.	Pos.	Nation	Player
3	DF	USA	Tanner Beason
4	MF	USA	Derek Waldeck
6	DF	EGY	Adam Mosharrafa
7	MF	USA	Will Richmond
8	MF	USA	Jared Gilbey
9	FW	TUR	Arda Bulut
10	FW	USA	Charlie Wehan
11	MF	USA	Amir Bashti
12	DF	USA	Ryan Ludwick
13	MF	JPN	Kei Tomozawa
14	FW	USA	Zach Ryan
15	FW	USA	Rhys de Sota
16	DF	USA	Andrew Aprahamian
18	DF	HKG	Tyler Shaver

No.	Pos.	Nation	Player
19	FW	USA	Jack O'Brien
20	GK	USA	Charlie Furrer
21	DF	USA	Collin Liberty
22	MF	FRA	Logan Panchot
23	MF	USA	Marc Joshua
24	MF	USA	Kyle Casey
25	MF	USA	Matthew Radzihovsky
28	MF	USA	Willy Miyamoto
30	GK	ENG	Andrew Thomas
31	GK	ESP	Eduardo Fabre
32	GK	USA	Matt Frank
33	GK	USA	Kyle Orciuch

== Schedule ==
=== Spring season ===
Win Draw Loss Upcoming fixture

August 14, 2018 Exh.	Stanford	2–1	Saint Mary's	Stanford, CA
7:00 PM PDT	Logan Panchot 61'; Tanner Beason 84' (pen.)	Report	Jakub Svehlik 22'	Stadium: Cagan Stadium; Attendance: 0 Referee: Frank Anderson

August 18, 2018 Exh.	Stanford	2–0	Cal State Northridge	Stanford, CA
4:00 PM PDT	Logan Panchot (yellow card) 29'; Tanner Beason 41' (pen.); Amir Bashti (yellow card) 68'; Marc Joshua 84'	Report	Giovanni Aguilar (yellow card) 41'; Samuel Dadie (yellow card) 41'; Johnny Rodriguez (yellow card) 63'	Stadium: Cagan Stadium; Attendance: 0 Referee: Frank Anderson

=== Regular season ===
Win Draw Loss Upcoming fixture

August 24, 2018 1	#1 Stanford	0–0 (a.e.t.)	San Jose State	Stanford, CA
5:00 PM PDT	Andrew Aprahamian (yellow card) 54'; Derek Waldeck (yellow card) 82'	Report	Willy Miranda (yellow card) 11'; Angel Farias (yellow card) 28'; Zach Penner (yellow card) 46'; Eduardo Miranda (yellow card) 55'	Stadium: Cagan Stadium; Attendance: 1,767; Referee: Michael Zapata

August 31, 2018 2	Maryland	0–0 (a.e.t.)	#10 Stanford	College Park, MD
3:00 PM PDT	Johannes Bergmann (yellow card) 38'	Report	Tanner Beason (yellow card) 51'	Stadium: Ludwig Field; Attendance: 5,802; Referee: Sorin Stoica

September 3, 2018 3	Georgetown	1–1 (a.e.t.)	Stanford	Washington, D.C.
10:00 AM PDT	Brendan McDonough (yellow card) 35'; Ethan Lochner (yellow card) 42' (goal) 65'; Dylan Nealis (yellow card) 84'	Report	Logan Panchot (yellow card) 66'; Amir Bashti 85'	Stadium: Shaw Field; Attendance: 1,833; Referee: Mike Stutt

September 7, 2018 4	#16 San Francisco	0–2	Stanford	San Francisco, CA
7:00 PM PDT	Seamus McLaughlin (yellow card) 8'; Bar Twito (yellow card) 49'	Report	Jared Gilbey (yellow card) 60'; Derek Waldeck 67'; Adam Mosharrafa 69'; Andrew Aprahamian (yellow card) 85'	Stadium: Negoesco Stadium; Attendance: 1,529; Referee: Turan Ozdemir

September 14, 2018 5	Stanford	1–0	#15 UMass Lowell	Stanford, CA
7:00 PM PDT	Zach Ryan 17'	Report	Renato Kauzlaric (yellow card) 4'	Stadium: Cagan Stadium; Attendance: 761; Referee: Ricardo Salazar

September 16, 2018 6	Stanford	3–0	Delaware	Stanford, CA
1:00 PM PDT	Amir Bashti 18', 19'; Zach Ryan 69'	Report	David Vavrous (yellow card) 85'	Stadium: Cagan Stadium; Attendance: 668; Referee: Ian Johnson

September 20, 2018 7	Stanford	0–1	Pacific	Stanford, CA
7:00 PM PDT	Jared Gilbey (yellow card) 72'	Report	Bob Groenendijk (yellow card) 12'; Jonathan Jimenez 17'; Ryan Her (yellow card) 72'; Wouter Verstraaten (yellow card) 74'	Stadium: Cagan Stadium; Attendance: 1,556; Referee: Daniel Radford

September 27, 2018 8	Stanford	3–0	San Diego State	Stanford, CA
5:00 PM PDT	Logan Panchot 55'; Zach Ryan 56'; Amir Bashti 66'	Report	Tevenn Roux (yellow card) 87'	Stadium: Cagan Stadium; Attendance: 749; Referee: Jorge Luna Hernandez

September 30, 2018 9	Stanford	3–0	UCLA	Stanford, CA
5:00 PM PDT	Charlie Wehan 52'; Amir Bashti 67'; Jack O'Brein 80'	Report	Anderson Asiedu (yellow card) 4'; Frankie Amaya (yellow card) 84'	Stadium: Cagan Stadium; Attendance: 1,893; Referee: Chipalo Street

October 7, 2018 10	California	2–4	#18 Stanford	Berkeley, CA
3:00 PM PDT	54' (o.g.); Sam Ebstein 76'	Report	Amir Bashti 27'; Andrew Aprahamian (yellow card) 32'; Tanner Beason 33', 68'; Marc Joshua (yellow card) 72'; Zach Ryan 83'	Stadium: Edwards Stadium

October 11, 2018 11	Oregon State	1–0	#10 Stanford	Corvallis, OR
6:00 PM PDT	Gloire Amanda 23'; Adrian Fernandez (yellow card) 82'; Don Tchilao (yellow card) 90'	Report	Arda Bulut (yellow card) 38'	Stadium: Lorenz Field; Attendance: 476; Referee: Hector Perez

October 14, 2018 12	Washington	2–3 (a.e.t.)	#10 Stanford	Seattle, WA
3:00 PM PDT	Dylan Teves 22'; Cole Grimsby (yellow card) 78'; Quinten Pearson (yellow card) 87'; Corban Anderson 87' (pen.)	Report	Zach Ryan 52'; Tanner Beason 78'; Jack O'Brein (yellow card) 81'; Collin Liberty (yellow card) 84'; Derek Waldeck (yellow card) 87'; Arda Bulut 107'	Stadium: Husky Soccer Stadium; Attendance: 1,965; Referee: Younes Marrakchi

October 18, 2018 13	#12 Stanford	2–2 (a.e.t.)	Oregon State	Stanford, CA
8:00 PM PDT	Logan Panchot (yellow card) 24'; Tanner Beason 36'; Charlie Wehan (yellow card) 41'; Will Richmond 68'	Report	Gloire Amanda 21' (yellow card) 61'; Albert Pedra 45'	Stadium: Cagan Stadium; Attendance: 1,143; Referee: Chipalo Street

October 21, 2018 14	#12 Stanford	3–1	Washington	Stanford, CA
3:00 PM PDT	Amir Bashti 3'; Jared Gilbey (yellow card) 6'; Zach Ryan 26'; Tanner Beason (yellow card) 45' (goal) 74'	Report	Gio Miglietti (yellow card) 54'; Freddy Kleeman (yellow card) 87'; Scott Menzies 68'	Stadium: Cagan Stadium; Attendance: 1,194; Referee: Daniel Radford

October 26, 2018 15	#9 Stanford	1–0 (a.e.t.)	#11 Denver	Stanford, CA
7:00 PM PDT	Tanner Beason (yellow card) 31'; Jack O'Brein (yellow card) 45'; Jared Gilbrey (yellow card) 82'; Zach Ryan 101'	Report	Andre Shinyashiki (yellow card) 34'; Jacob Stensson (yellow card) 78'	Stadium: Cagan Stadium; Attendance: 1,791; Referee: Randy Hoffman

November 1, 2018 16	San Diego State	0–2	#6 Stanford	San Diego, CA
7:00 PM PDT	Damian German (yellow card) 49'; Mac ClaRke (yellow card) 58'	Report	Charle Wehan 48'; Tanner Beason 72' (Pen.)	Stadium: SDSU Sports Deck; Attendance: 494; Referee: Bean Pearson

November 4, 2018 17	UCLA	0–1	#6 Stanford	Los Angeles, CA
4:00 PM PDT	Anderson Asiedu (yellow card) 50'; Mohammed Kamara (yellow card) 52'	Report	Zach Ryan 52'	Stadium: Wallis Annenburg Stadium; Attendance: 2,104; Referee: Frank Anderson

November 8, 2018 18	California	1–0	Stanford	Stanford, CA
6:00 PM PDT	JJ Foe Nuphaus 85'; Jonathan Estrada (yellow card) 90'	[Report]	Derek Waldeck (yellow card) 89'	Stadium: Cagan Stadium; Referee: Chipalo Street

=== NCAA tournament ===
November 18, 2018 Second Round	#9 Stanford	2–0	UC Irvine	Stanford, California
6:30 PST	Tanner Beason 72'; Zach Ryan 83'	Report		Stadium: Laird Q. Cagan Stadium; Attendance: 756; Referee: Ian Anderson

November 25, 2018 Third Round	#8 Saint Mary's	0–0 (a.e.t.) (2–4 p)	#9 Stanford	Moraga, California
1:00 PST	Valentin Sponer (yellow card) 23'	Report	Jared Gilbey (yellow card) 106'	Stadium: Saint Mary's Stadium; Attendance: 2,753; Referee: Bernhard Hosu
	Penalties
	Zattarin (penalty missed); Engebretsen (penalty scored); Sponer (penalty scored); Svehlik (penalty missed)		Mosharrafa (penalty scored); Bulut (penalty scored); Beason (penalty scored); Waldeck (penalty scored)

November 30, 2018 Quarterfinals	#9 Stanford	2–3	Akron	Stanford, California
6:00 PST	Tanner Beason (yellow card) 49' (goal) 57' (pen.); Zach Ryan 68'; Charlie Wehan (yellow card) 54'; Ryan Ludwick (yellow card) 82'; Andrew Aprahamian (yellow card) 85'	Report	Marcel Zajac 15', 44'; Abdi Mohamed (yellow card) 51'; Colin Biros 81'	Stadium: Laird Q. Cagan Stadium; Attendance: 1,405; Referee: Daniel Radford

== Goals Record ==
Rank	No.	Po.	Name	Regular season	NCAA tournament	Total
1	14	FW	(United States) Zach Ryan	8	2	10
2	3	DF	(United States) Tanner Beason	6	2	8
3	11	MF/FW	(United States) Amir Bashti	7	0	7
4	10	FW	(United States) Charlie Wehan	2	0	2
5	4	MF	(United States) Derek Waldeck	1	0	1
5	22	MF/DF	(United States) Logan Panchot	1	0	1
5	9	FW	(United States) Arda Bulut	1	0	1
5	7	MF	(United States) Will Richmond	1	0	1
5	6	MF	(United States) Adam Mosharrafa	1	0	1
5	19	FW	(United States) Jack O'Brein	1	0	1
Total				29	4	33

As of December 3, 2018

== Disciplinary record ==
No.	Po.	Name	Regular Season			NCAA tournament			Total		
No.	Po.	Name	Booked	(yellow card) (yellow-red card)	Sent off (straight red)	Booked	(yellow card) (yellow-red card)	Sent off (straight red)	Booked	(yellow card) (yellow-red card)	Sent off (straight red)
3	DF	Tanner Beason	1	0	0	0	0	0	1	0	0
4	MF	Derek Waldeck	1	0	0	0	0	0	1	0	0
8	MF	Jared Gilbey	2	0	0	0	0	0	2	0	0
9	FW	Marc Joshua	1	0	0	0	0	0	1	0	0
16	DF	Andrew Aprahamain	3	0	0	0	0	0	3	0	0
22	MF/DF	Logan Panchot	1	0	0	0	0	0	1	0	0
23	MF	Marc Joshua	1	0	0	0	0	0	1	0	0
Total			10	0	0	0	0	0	10	0	0

As of October 12, 2018

== Awards and honors ==
Recipient	Award	Date	Ref.
Amir Bashti	Pac-12 Player of the Week	September 18, 2018	
Amir Bashti	Pac-12 Player of the Week	October 2, 2018	
Tanner Beason	Pac-12 Player of the Week	October 9, 2018	
Tanner Beason	Pac-12 Player of the Week	November 6, 2018	

== 2019 MLS Super Draft ==
Player	Team	Round	Pick #	Position
Amir Bashti	Atlanta United FC	2	48	FW

== Rankings ==
Ranking movement Legend: ██ Improvement in ranking. ██ Decrease in ranking. ██ Not ranked the previous week. RV=Others receiving votes.
Poll	Pre	Wk 1	Wk 2	Wk 3	Wk 4	Wk 5	Wk 6	Wk 7	Wk 8	Wk 9	Wk 10	Wk 11	Wk 12	Wk 13	Wk 14	Wk 15	Wk 16	Final
United Soccer	1	10	25	RV	RV	RV	18	10	12	9	6 (1)	6	7	None Released				7
TopDrawer Soccer	1	1	4	24	24	22		RV	21	25	RV	7	5	8	5	2	6	6
