= Michael Wetungu =

American soccer player (born 1998)

Personal information
- Full name: Michael Wetungu
- Date of birth: April 25, 1998 (age 28)
- Place of birth: Rochester Hills, Michigan, United States
- Height: 6 ft 2 in (1.88 m)
- Position: Defender

Youth career
- –2016: Vardar SC

College career
Years	Team	Apps	(Gls)
2016–2019	Michigan State Spartans	72	(3)

Senior career*
Years	Team	Apps	(Gls)
2017	Michigan Bucks	0	(0)
2017–2018	Lansing United	6	(0)
2019	Flint City Bucks	2	(0)
2020	Real Monarchs	2	(0)
- * Club domestic league appearances and goals as of October 5, 2020

Michael Wetungu (born April 25, 1998) is an American soccer player who plays as a defender.

== Career ==
=== College and amateur ===
Up to 2016, Wetungu played with the USSDA academy team Vardar, before Wetungu attended and played four years of college soccer at Michigan State University between 2016 and 2019. During his time with the Spartans, Wetungu made 72 appearances and scoring 3 goals as a central defender. He was named to the Big Ten All-Freshman team in his freshman year.

While in college, Wetungu played with USL League Two sides Flint City Bucks (formerly Michigan Bucks) and Lansing United. He also played with Lansing United in the NPSL prior to their move to the USL.

=== Professional ===
On January 9, 2020, Wetungu was selected 46th overall in the 2020 MLS SuperDraft by Real Salt Lake. Wetungu signed for the club's USL Championship affiliate Real Monarchs on February 5, 2020.

Wetungu made his professional debut on September 16, 2020, starting in a 2–1 loss to Portland Timbers 2.

His option was declined by Real Monarchs following the 2020 season.
