= Seattle–Washington men's basketball rivalry =

Cross-city college basketball rivalry

Seattle U–Washington men's basketball rivalry
- Seattle Redhawks Washington Huskies
- Sport: College basketball
- First meeting: 1953
- Latest meeting: December 19, 2025; Seattle U 70, Washington 66
- Next meeting: 2026

Statistics
- Total meetings: 41
- All-time series: Washington, 35–6
- Largest victory: Washington, 123–76 (2010)
- Longest win streak: Washington, 19 (1978–2023)
- Current win streak: Seattle, 2 (2024–2025)

The Seattle U–Washington's men's basketball rivalry, known as the Battle for Seattle, is a cross-city college basketball rivalry between the Seattle Redhawks men's basketball team of Seattle University and the Washington Huskies men's basketball team of the University of Washington.

Seattle competes as a member of the West Coast Conference, while Washington is a member of the Big Ten Conference.

== Series history ==
Despite the two teams' proximity (Note: Their campuses are approximately 3.1 miles (5.0 km) apart as the crow flies), their first meeting only occurred in the West-2 Regional semifinal round of the 1953 NCAA basketball tournament; Washington emerged victorious by a score of 92–70. The teams did not meet again until 1969, when they began a split home-and-home series, played annually until 1980. The rivalry came to an end when Seattle moved its athletic programs to NAIA in March 1980, owing to budgetary pressures and changes in administrative philosophy. The Redhawks began the transition back to Division I competition in 2008, and the rivalry was resumed in March 2009.

In 2009, Seattle University and University of Washington agreed to renew their rivalry by playing annually on a rotating home-court basis. Seattle's then-head coach Cameron Dollar came from Washington as an assistant under Lorenzo Romar, which helped restart the rivalry when the Redhawks returned to Division I. In 2017, the two schools played in the 2K Sports Classic.

In 2024, in the 40th meeting between the teams, Seattle snapped a 46-year old, 19-game losing streak in the rivalry with a 79–70 victory. The Redhawks defeated the Huskies again in 2025, the first time that Seattle claimed consecutive victories in the rivalry.

As of the 2026 season, the series has been put on hiatus after Washington declined to schedule the Redhawks.

== Game results ==
Seattle U victories	Washington victories

No.	Date	Location	Winner	Score
1	March 13, 1953	Oregon State Coliseum	Washington	92–70
2	December 5, 1969	Hec Edmundson Pavilion	Washington	86–78
3	January 2, 1970	Seattle Center Coliseum	Seattle U	80–72
4	December 4, 1970	Hec Edmundson Pavilion	Washington	87–85
5	January 2, 1971	Seattle Center Coliseum	Seattle U	86–81
6	December 11, 1971	Seattle Center Coliseum	Washington	96–74
7	January 29, 1972	Hec Edmundson Pavilion	Washington	91–79
8	December 8, 1972	Seattle Center Coliseum	Washington	68–56
9	January 25, 1973	Hec Edmundson Pavilion	Washington	74–67
10	December 7, 1973	Seattle Center Coliseum	Washington	81–74
11	January 26, 1974	Hec Edmundson Pavilion	Washington	88–64
12	January 2, 1975	Seattle Center Coliseum	Washington	50–45
13	January 25, 1975	Hec Edmundson Pavilion	Washington	80–72
14	November 29, 1975	Hec Edmundson Pavilion	Washington	72–66
15	January 3, 1976	Seattle Center Coliseum	Washington	106–75
16	November 28, 1976	Seattle Center Coliseum	Seattle U	78–64
17	January 22, 1977	Hec Edmundson Pavilion	Washington	55–54
18	December 10, 1977	Seattle Center Coliseum	Washington	85–58
19	January 22, 1978	Hec Edmundson Pavilion	Washington	69–60
20	November 28, 1978	Hec Edmundson Pavilion	Seattle U	82–78
21	December 15, 1978	Seattle Center Coliseum	Washington	91–82
22	December 15, 1979	Seattle Center Coliseum	Washington	89–67
23	January 29, 1980	Hec Edmundson Pavilion	Washington	83–77
24	March 3, 2009	Bank of America Arena	Washington	87–60
25	January 26, 2010	Bank of America Arena	Washington	123–76
26	February 22, 2011	KeyArena	Washington	95–74
27	January 10, 2012	Alaska Airlines Arena	Washington	91–83
28	December 13, 2012	KeyArena	Washington	87–74
29	November 10, 2013	Alaska Airlines Arena	Washington	88–78
30	November 21, 2014	KeyArena	Washington	63–48
31	December 22, 2015	Alaska Airlines Arena	Washington	79–68
32	December 22, 2016	KeyArena	Washington	94–72
33	November 24, 2017	Alaska Airlines Arena	Washington	89–84
34	December 9, 2018	Alaska Airlines Arena	Washington	70–62
35	December 17, 2019	Alaska Airlines Arena	Washington	81–59
36	December 9, 2020	Alaska Airlines Arena	Washington	73–41
37	December 18, 2021	Alaska Airlines Arena	Washington	64–56
38	November 28, 2022	Alaska Airlines Arena	Washington	77–66
39	December 17, 2023	Climate Pledge Arena	Washington	100–99^{2OT}
40	December 23, 2024	Alaska Airlines Arena	Seattle U	79–70
41	December 19, 2025	Climate Pledge Arena	Seattle U	70–66
Series: Washington leads 35–6

== See also ==
- Fewing Cup
