= Amir Bashti =

American soccer player (born 1997)

Personal information
- Date of birth: March 21, 1997 (age 29)
- Place of birth: San Jose, California, U.S.
- Height: 1.75 m (5 ft 9 in)
- Positions: Midfielder; winger; forward

Youth career
- 2014: San Jose Earthquakes

College career
Years	Team	Apps	(Gls)
2015–2018	Stanford Cardinal	88	(19)

Senior career*
Years	Team	Apps	(Gls)
2016–2017	Burlingame Dragons	7	(1)
2019	San Francisco Glens	2	(0)
2019–2020	Atlanta United 2	24	(2)

International career
2014–2015	United States U18	1	(0)
2015–2016	United States U20	2	(0)
- * Club domestic league appearances and goals as of December 4, 2020

Amir Bashti (born March 21, 1997) is an American former professional soccer player.

== Early life ==
Bashti was born and raised in San Jose, California. He attended Monta Vista High School in Cupertino and played youth soccer for the San Jose Earthquakes Academy. He is of Iranian descent.

== College career ==
Bashti played four years of college soccer at Stanford University from 2015 to 2018. As a 4-year starter, he won 3 national titles with Stanford, recording 19 goals and 13 assists in 88 games in his collegiate career. He won Pac-12 player of the week honors twice during his senior year and was named in the All-Pac-12 first team at the end of the season.

While at college, Bashti also appeared for USL PDL side Burlingame Dragons in 2016 and 2017.

== Professional career ==
=== Early career ===
In the 2019 MLS SuperDraft, Atlanta United selected Bashti in the second round (48th overall).

After failing to sign a contract with Atlanta, on June 28, 2019, Amir went back to California where he grew up and signed a contract with the San Francisco Glens of the USL League Two, where he played in two matches.

In August 2019, Bashti trained with the Glens' European partner club, German 2. Bundesliga side Holstein Kiel, playing in an under-23 match against Hamburger SV II.

=== Atlanta United 2 ===
On August 22, 2019, Bashti went back to Atlanta and signed a contract with their reserve side Atlanta United 2 who play in the USL Championship. He scored his first goal for the club on September 28, 2019, in a 1–1 draw at Saint Louis FC. Bashti scored his first goal of the 2020 season and provided an assist on September 23, 2020, against New York Red Bulls II. He was subsequently named in the USL Championship Team of the Week for his performance against New York.

== International career ==
=== Youth ===
Bashti was called up to the United States men's national under-18 soccer team in December 2014 and played in a friendly match against Germany U-18 on December 19, 2014, in Marbella. He played for the U-20 team against France on September 4, 2015, and Israel on September 7, 2015, before being called into the under-20 squad by manager Tab Ramos for the Dallas Cup in March 2016. In July 2016, Bashti was named in Brad Friedel's squad for the 2016 COTIF Tournament.

== Style of play ==
Bashti is a versatile midfielder and can play in any position in the front six; central midfield being his preferred position.

== Honors ==
Stanford Cardinals

- NCAA Division I Men's Soccer Championship: 2015, 2016, 2017
- Pac-12 Conference: 2015, 2016, 2017, 2018

Individual

- First team All-Pac-12: 2018
