= 2019 Washington Huskies men's soccer team =

American college soccer season

2019 Washington Huskies men's soccer

Pac-12 champions Seattle Cup champions

NCAA Tournament, Quarterfinals
- Conference: Pac-12 Conference

Ranking
- Coaches: No. 4
- TopDrawerSoccer.com: No. 5
- Record: 17–4–0 (7–2–0 Pac-12)
- Head coach: Jamie Clark (9th season)
- Associate head coach: Jeff Rowland (9th season)
- Assistant coaches: Richard Reece (15th season); Raphael Cox (1st season)
- Home stadium: Husky Soccer Stadium

2019 Pac-12 Conference men's soccer standings
	Conf.					Overall
Team	W		L		T	W		L		T
No. 6 Washington †	9	–	2	–	0	16	–	4	–	0
No. 4 Stanford +	6	–	2	–	2	14	–	3	–	5
Oregon State	5	–	3	–	2	8	–	5	–	2
California +	4	–	4	–	2	8	–	7	–	3
UCLA	2	–	6	–	1	6	–	9	–	2
San Diego State	1	–	9	–	0	4	–	12	–	2
† – Conference champion + – Invited to the 2019 NCAA Tournament; As of 17 December 2019; Rankings from United Soccer Coaches

The 2019 Washington Huskies men's soccer team represented the University of Washington during the 2019 NCAA Division I men's soccer season and the 2019 Pac-12 Conference men's soccer season. It was the program's 57th season fielding a men's varsity soccer team, and their 20th season in the Pac-12 Conference. The 2019 season was Jamie Clark's ninth year as head coach for the program. The regular season began on August 30 and concluded on November 16, with the Huskies winning the 2019 Pac-12 Championship. The conference title has been the third for Washington and its first since 2013. The team had entered the NCAA Tournament as the No. 6 seed and lost to the eventual national champions Georgetown in quarterfinals.

== Background ==
The Huskies finished the 2018 season with a 12–7–1 overall record and a 6–4 record in Pac-12 play, good enough for a third place finish in the conference. Despite not winning the Pac-12 title, the Huskies earned an at-large berth into the 2018 NCAA Division I Men's Soccer Tournament. Washington hosted Lipscomb University in the first round, where they tied 0–0 in regulation before losing 4–5 on penalty kicks. Scott Menzies lead Washington with 7 goals across all competitions.

== Player movement ==
=== 2019 MLS Draft ===
Player	Position	Round	Pick	Team	Ref.
Kyle Coffee	FW	2	41	Real Salt Lake	

=== Recruits ===
No.	Name	Pos.	Nat.	Hometown	High School	Club	MLS rights	TDS Rating
0	Sam Fowler	GK	USA	Issaquah, WA	Issaquah	Tacoma Defiance	Seattle Sounders FC	3/5 stars
14	Christian Soto-Rincon	MF	USA	Des Moines, WA	Mount Rainier	Washington Crossfire	none	3/5 stars
18	Imanol Rosales	MF	MEX	Querétaro City, MEX	UBM		none	NR
21	Jayson Baca	DF	USA	Albuquerque, NM	Mountain Ridge (AZ)	Colorado Rapids U-19	Colorado Rapids	2/5 stars
23	Nick Scardina	MF	USA	Portland, OR	Central Catholic (OR)	Portland Timbers U-19	Portland Timbers	3/5 stars
25	Euan Clark	MF	USA	Granite Bay, CA	Granite Bay	Sacramento Republic U-19	Sacramento Republic	3/5 stars
27	Jensen Jabara	DF	USA	San Diego, CA	IMG Academy	Bradenton Academics	none	3/5 stars
28	Gabe Threadgold	MF	USA	Bremerton, WA	Central Kitsap	Tacoma Defiance	Seattle Sounders FC	3/5 stars
30	Jacob Castro	MF	USA	Tacoma, WA	Spanaway Lake	Tacoma Defiance	Seattle Sounders FC	NR

== Roster ==
As of September 15, 2019

Note: Flags indicate national team as defined under FIFA eligibility rules; some limited exceptions apply. Players may hold more than one non-FIFA nationality.

No.	Pos.	Nation	Player
0	GK	USA	Sam Fowler
1	GK	USA	Andrew Morrison
2	DF	USA	Kasey French
3	DF	USA	Freddy Kleeman
4	DF	USA	Ryan Sailor
5	DF	USA	Ethan Bartlow
6	MF	ECU	Daniel Ribas
7	MF	USA	Jaret Townsend
8	FW	ITA	Gio Miglietti
9	MF	USA	Dylan Teves
10	MF	ENG	James Smith
11	FW	USA	Joey Parish
12	MF	USA	Tyler Smith
13	MF	USA	John Magnus
14	MF	USA	Christian Soto
15	MF	USA	Ryan DeGroot

No.	Pos.	Nation	Player
16	DF	USA	Jasper Malamud
17	MF	USA	Michael Rojas
18	MF	MEX	Imanol Rosales
19	MF	USA	Cole Grimsby
20	DF	USA	Charlie Ostrem
21	DF	USA	Jayson Baca
22	FW	USA	Ryan Crowley
23	MF	USA	Nick Scardina
25	MF	USA	Euan Clark
26	MF	USA	Noah Whitman
27	DF	USA	Jensen Jabara
28	MF	USA	Gabe Threadgold
30	MF	USA	Jacob Castro
33	MF	USA	Lucas Meek
82	DF	USA	Andrew Conwell
98	MF	USA	Blake Bodily
99	GK	USA	Bryce Logan

== Preseason ==
=== Preseason Pac-12 poll ===
Washington was predicted to finish second in the Pac-12 Conference.

Coaches' Poll
Predicted finish	Team	Votes (1st place)
1	Stanford	25 (15)
2	Washington	19
3	Oregon State	17 (1)
4	California	13
5	UCLA	11
6	San Diego State	5

=== Pre-season All-Pac-12 selections ===
2019 Preseason All-Pac-12 Team
Player	Pos.
Ethan Bartlow	DF
Blake Bodily	MF
Dylan Teves	MF

== Schedule ==
Date Time, TV	Rank^{#}	Opponent^{#}	Result	Record	Site (Attendance) City, State
Preseason
August 21*; 7:00 p.m.		Seattle Pacific; Rivalry	W 5–1		Husky Soccer Stadium; Seattle, WA
August 26*; 7:00 p.m.		at Gonzaga	T 1–1	{{{record}}}	Gonzaga Soccer Field; Spokane, WA
Non-conference regular season
August 30*; 7:30 p.m., UWTV2		No. 18 Denver	W 2–1	1–0–0	Husky Soccer Stadium (1,107); Seattle, WA
September 2*; 1:00 p.m., UWTV2		San Francisco	W 4–0	2–0–0	Husky Soccer Stadium (564); Seattle, WA
September 6*; 4:00 p.m., BTN+	No. 13	at No. 16 Michigan State	W 1–0	3–0–0	DeMartin Stadium (1,074); East Lansing, MI
September 8*; 3:00 p.m., BTN+	No. 13	at Michigan	W 1–0	4–0–0	U-M Soccer Stadium (704); Ann Arbor, MI
September 12*; 7:00 p.m., BWTV	No. 8	at Cal State Northridge	L 1–3	4–1–0	Matador Soccer Field (708); Northridge, CA
September 15*; 6:00 p.m., WACDN	No. 8	at Seattle; Seattle Cup	W 3–0	5–1–0	Championship Field (1,331); Seattle, WA
Pac-12 regular season
September 19; 6:00 p.m., P12N	No. 12	San Diego State	W 2–0	6–1–0 (1–0–0)	Husky Soccer Stadium (470); Seattle, WA
September 22; 4:00 p.m., P12N	No. 12	No. 19 UCLA	W 5–0	7–1–0 (2–0–0)	Husky Soccer Stadium (1,210); Seattle, WA
September 29*; 4:00 p.m., P12N	No. 10	Portland	W 1–0	8–1–0 (2–0–0)	Husky Soccer Stadium (1,065); Seattle, WA
October 3; 5:00 p.m., P12N	No. 7	at No. 1 Stanford	W 2–1 ^{2OT}	9–1–0 (3–0–0)	Laird Q. Cagan Stadium (1,019); Stanford, CA
October 6; 3:00 p.m., P12+	No. 7	at California	W 1–0	10–1–0 (4–0–0)	Edwards Stadium (943); Berkeley, CA
October 13; 3:00 p.m., P12+	No. 2	Oregon State	W 2–1	11–1–0 (5–0–0)	Husky Soccer Stadium (1,083); Seattle, WA
October 16*; 7:00 p.m., P12+	No. 2	Gonzaga	W 4–0	12–1–0 (5–0–0)	Husky Soccer Stadium (583); Seattle, WA
October 24; 5:00 p.m., P12N	No. 1	at UCLA	W 1–0	13–1–0 (6–0–0)	Wallis Annenberg Stadium (1,396); Los Angeles, CA
October 27; 2:30 p.m., MWN/Stadium	No. 1	at San Diego State	W 3–0	14–1–0 (7–0–0)	SDSU Sports Deck (251); San Diego, CA
November 7; 7:00 p.m., UWTV2	No. 1	California	L 2–3	14–2–0 (7–1–0)	Husky Soccer Stadium (928); Seattle, WA
November 10; 2:00 p.m., P12N	No. 1	No. 5 Stanford	L 0–1	14–3–0 (7–2–0)	Husky Soccer Stadium (1,462); Seattle, WA
November 15; 7:00 p.m.	No. 6	at Oregon State	W 3–1	15–3–0 (8–2–0)	Lorenz Field (843); Corvallis, OR
NCAA Tournament
November 24*; 5:00 p.m., P12+	(6) No. 4	vs. Boston College; Second Round	W 2–0	16–3–0	Husky Soccer Stadium (1,221); Seattle, WA
December 1*; 5:00 p.m., P12+	(6) No. 4	vs. (11) No. 11 Marshall; Third Round	W 4–1	17–3–0	Husky Soccer Stadium (1,530); Seattle, WA
December 7*; 9:00 a.m., BEDN	(6) No. 4	vs. (3) No. 2 Georgetown; Quarterfinals	L 1–2	17–4–0	Shaw Field (2,093); Washington, D.C.
*Non-conference game. ^{#}Rankings from United Soccer Coaches. (#) Tournament seedings in parentheses. All times are in Pacific Time.

== Rankings ==
Ranking movements Legend: ██ Increase in ranking ██ Decrease in ranking — = Not ranked RV = Received votes ( ) = First-place votes
	Week														
Poll	Pre	1	2	3	4	5	6	7	8	9	10	11	12	13	Final
United Soccer	RV	13	8	12	10	7	2	2 (4)	1 (21)	1 (21)	1 (23)	6 (1)	4		
Top Drawer Soccer	—	—	13	11	23	17	13	2	2	1	1	1	5	5	
College Soccer News	28	23	10	12	10	5	3	3	1	1	1	9	6		
Soccer America	18	12	7	13	10	5	2	2	1	1	1	6			4

== Statistics ==
=== Appearances and goals ===
No.	Pos	Nat	Player	Total		Regular season		NCAA Tournament	
No.	Pos	Nat	Player	Apps	Goals	Apps	Goals	Apps	Goals
0	GK	(United States)	Sam Fowler	9	0	9	0	0	0
1	GK	(United States)	Andrew Morrison	1	0	1	0	0	0
2	DF	(United States)	Kasey French	15	1	15	1	0	0
3	DF	(United States)	Freddy Kleeman	14	1	14	1	0	0
4	DF	(United States)	Ryan Sailor	8	0	8	0	0	0
5	DF	(United States)	Ethan Bartlow	16	3	16	3	0	0
6	MF	(Ecuador)	Daniel Ribas	0	0	0	0	0	0
7	MF	(United States)	Jaret Townsend	16	5	16	5	0	0
8	FW	(Italy)	Gio Miglietti	16	5	16	5	0	0
9	MF	(United States)	Dylan Teves	9	1	9	1	0	0
10	MF	(England)	James Smith	8	0	8	0	0	0
11	FW	(United States)	Joey Parish	16	2	16	2	0	0
12	MF	(United States)	Tyler Smith	10	0	10	0	0	0
13	MF	(United States)	John Magnus	15	0	15	0	0	0
14	MF	(United States)	Christian Soto	16	0	16	0	0	0
15	MF	(United States)	Ryan DeGroot	11	1	11	1	0	0
16	DF	(United States)	Jasper Malamud	4	0	4	0	0	0
17	MF	(United States)	Michael Rojas	2	0	2	0	0	0
18	MF	(Mexico)	Imanol Rosales	15	1	15	1	0	0
19	MF	(United States)	Cole Grimsby	11	0	11	0	0	0
20	DF	(United States)	Charlie Ostrem	16	0	16	0	0	0
21	DF	(United States)	Jayson Baca	8	0	8	0	0	0
22	FW	(United States)	Ryan Crowley	2	0	2	0	0	0
23	MF	(United States)	Nick Scardina	4	0	4	0	0	0
25	MF	(United States)	Euan Clark	0	0	0	0	0	0
26	MF	(United States)	Noah Whitman	0	0	0	0	0	0
28	MF	(United States)	Gabe Threadgold	0	0	0	0	0	0
30	MF	(United States)	Jacob Castro	0	0	0	0	0	0
33	MF	(United States)	Lucas Meek	14	6	14	6	0	0
82	DF	(United States)	Andrew Conwell	0	0	0	0	0	0
98	MF	(United States)	Blake Bodily	14	9	14	9	0	0
99	GK	(United States)	Bryce Logan	7	0	7	0	0	0

Last updated: 9 November 2019
Source: GoHuskies.com
