= 2019 California Golden Bears men's soccer team =

American college soccer season

2019 California Golden Bears men's soccer

NCAA Tournament, First Round
- Conference: Pac-12 Conference
- Record: 8–7–3 (4–4–2 Pac-12)
- Head coach: Kevin Grimes (20th season)
- Assistant coaches: Jacob Wilson (4th season); Henry Foulk (20th season)
- Home stadium: Edwards Stadium

2019 Pac-12 Conference men's soccer standings
	Conf.					Overall
Team	W		L		T	W		L		T
No. 6 Washington †	9	–	2	–	0	16	–	4	–	0
No. 4 Stanford +	6	–	2	–	2	14	–	3	–	5
Oregon State	5	–	3	–	2	8	–	5	–	2
California +	4	–	4	–	2	8	–	7	–	3
UCLA	2	–	6	–	1	6	–	9	–	2
San Diego State	1	–	9	–	0	4	–	12	–	2
† – Conference champion + – Invited to the 2019 NCAA Tournament; As of 17 December 2019; Rankings from United Soccer Coaches

The 2019 California Golden Bears men's soccer team represented University of California, Berkeley during the 2019 NCAA Division I men's soccer season and the 2019 Pac-12 Conference men's soccer season. The regular season began on August 30 and concluded on November 14. It was the program's 114th season fielding a men's varsity soccer team, and their 20th season in the Pac-12 Conference. The 2019 season was Kevin Grimes's twentieth year as head coach for the program.

== Roster ==
As of December 7, 2019

Note: Flags indicate national team as defined under FIFA eligibility rules; some limited exceptions apply. Players may hold more than one non-FIFA nationality.

No.	Pos.	Nation	Player
0	GK	USA	Benjamin Ayers
1	GK	USA	Noah Texter
2	DF	USA	JJ Foe Nuphaus
3	DF	USA	Simon Lekressner
4	DF	USA	Ian Lonergan
5	FW	USA	Dylan Penn
6	MF	USA	Jack Singer
7	MF	USA	Taylor Davila
8	FW	USA	Javier Macias
9	FW	USA	Tommy Williamson
10	FW	USA	Jonathan Estrada
11	MF	USA	Fahmi Ibrahim
12	MF	USA	Lucas Churchill
13	MF	USA	Fernando Andrade

No.	Pos.	Nation	Player
14	MF	USA	Francisco Perez
15	MF	SLV	Christian Gomez
16	DF	JAM	Christopher Grey
17	MF	USA	Alonzo Del Mundo
18	GK	USA	Chris Gustini
19	FW	USA	Arman Samimi
21	FW	USA	Paolo Carrillo-Weisenburger
22	GK	USA	Drake Callender
23	DF	USA	Togo Nakamura
24	GK	USA	Collin Travasos
25	MF	USA	Kaleo Fernandez
26	DF	USA	Tate Dolan
30	MF	USA	Juan Martinez

== Schedule ==
Date Time, TV	Rank^{#}	Opponent^{#}	Result	Record	Site (Attendance) City, State
Non-conference regular season
August 30*; 5:00 p.m.		Omaha	W 1–0	1–0–0	Edwards Stadium (200); Berkeley, CA
September 1*; 12:00 p.m.		No. 25 UC Irvine	T 1–1 ^{2OT}	1–0–1	Edwards Stadium (359); Berkeley, CA
September 7*; 7:00 p.m.		at UC Santa Barbara	W 3–0	2–0–1	Harder Stadium (1,512); Santa Barbara, CA
September 13*; 5:00 p.m.		American	W 2–0	3–0–1	Edwards Stadium (175); Berkeley, CA
September 15*; 12:00 p.m., P12N		Denver	L 0–1	3–1–1	Edwards Stadium (217); Berkeley, CA
Pac-12 Conference regular season
September 20; 4:30 p.m., P12N		No. 2 Stanford	L 1–2	3–2–1 (0–1–0)	Edwards Stadium (817); Berkeley, CA
September 28*; 12:00 p.m.		San Francisco	W 2–0	4–2–1	Edwards Stadium (342); Berkeley, CA
October 3; 12:00 p.m., P12N		Oregon State	W 2–1	5–2–1 (1–1–0)	Edwards Stadium (63); Berkeley, CA
October 6; 3:00 p.m., P12N		No. 7 Washington	L 0–1	5–3–1 (1–2–0)	Edwards Stadium (943); Berkeley, CA
October 10; 7:00 p.m., Stadium		at San Diego State	W 4–0	6–3–1 (2–2–0)	SDSU Sports Deck (608); San Diego, CA
October 13; 4:00 p.m., P12N		at UCLA	T 3–3 ^{2OT}	6–3–2 (2–2–1)	Wallis Annenberg Stadium (1,653); Los Angeles, CA
October 22*; 7:00 p.m.		at Portland	L 1–2	6–4–2	Merlo Field (1,001); Portland, OR
October 31; 4:00 p.m., P12N		UCLA	T 3–3 ^{2OT}	6–4–3 (2–2–2)	Edwards Stadium (146); Berkeley, CA
November 3; 3:00 p.m., P12N		San Diego State	L 0–1	6–5–3 (2–3–2)	Edwards Stadium (540); Berkeley, CA
November 7; 7:00 p.m.		at No. 1 Washington	W 3–2	7–5–3 (3–3–2)	Husky Soccer Stadium (928); Seattle, WA
November 10; 1:00 p.m.		at Oregon State	L 0–1 ^{OT}	7–6–3 (3–4–2)	Paul Lorenz Field (625); Corvallis, OR
November 14; 7:00 p.m., P12N		at No. 4 Stanford	W 1–0	8–6–3 (4–4–2)	Laird Q. Cagan Stadium (1,525); Stanford, CA
NCAA Tournament
November 21; 7:00 p.m.		at No. 22 UC Santa Barbara; First Round	L 1–3	8–7–3	Harder Stadium (1,256); Santa Barbara, CA
*Non-conference game. ^{#}Rankings from United Soccer Coaches. (#) Tournament seedings in parentheses. All times are in Pacific Time.
