= Fewing Cup =

- Seattle Redhawks Washington Huskies
- Sport: College soccer
- First meeting: October 6, 1967; Washington 3, Seattle U 0
- Latest meeting: September 8, 2025; Washington 7, Seattle U 2
- Next meeting: 2026
- Stadiums: Championship Field; Husky Soccer Stadium
- Trophy: Fewing Cup

Statistics
- Total meetings: 65
- All-time series: Washington, 50–9–6
- Largest victory: Washington, 11–0 (1972)
- Longest win streak: Washington, 18 (1979–1996)
- Longest unbeaten streak: Washington, 18 (1979–1996)
- Current win streak: Washington, 1 (2025–present)
- Current unbeaten streak: Washington, 3 (2024–present)

Location of campuses in Seattle

The Fewing Cup is a traveling trophy awarded to the winner of the annual men's college soccer match between Seattle University and the University of Washington. Washington leads the all-time series, 50–9–6. The cup was first awarded in 2016.

In the event of a draw, the cup remains in the possession of the school holding it prior to the match. The cup is presented to the winning team by the Washington Athletic Club and the 101 Club. In 2023, the cup was renamed the "Fewing Cup" after retiring Seattle U coach and UW soccer alumnus Pete Fewing.

The rivalry has seen more media attention ever since Seattle U has reinstated its men's soccer program at the NCAA Division I level and has been competitive in the NCAA Division I Men's Soccer Tournament. A notable recent matchup between the teams was in the first round of the 2024 NCAA Division I men's soccer tournament. Neither team scored, and after two overtime periods, Washington advanced to the next round on penalty kicks.

== Match results ==
Seattle U victories	Washington victories	Tie games

No.	Date	Location	Winner	Score
1	Oct 6, 1967	UW	Washington	3–0
2	Nov 18, 1967	SU	Seattle U	3–0
3	Oct 9, 1968	UW	Washington	3–1
4	Oct 26, 1968	SU	Washington	2–0
5	Nov 18, 1968	SU	Tie	0–0
6	Oct 21, 1969	SU	Tie	1–1
7	Nov 15, 1969	UW	Washington	3–0
8	Nov 3, 1970	UW	Seattle U	3–1
9	Nov 21, 1970	SU	Washington	1–0
10	Sep 23, 1971	SU	Washington	3–2
11	Oct 23, 1971	SU	Seattle U	3–2
12	Sep 20, 1972	SU	Washington	11–0
13	Oct 13, 1972	UW	Washington	2–0
14	Oct 21, 1972	UW	Washington	4–0
15	Oct 10, 1973	UW	Washington	5–0
16	Nov 5, 1973	SU	Tie	1–1
17	Oct 23, 1974	SU	Washington	3–0
18	Nov 22, 1974	UW	Washington	6–0
19	Oct 22, 1975	SU	Washington	2–1
20	Nov 19, 1975	UW	Washington	2–1
21	Oct 27, 1975	UW	Washington	4–0
22	Nov 17, 1976	SU	Washington	7–0

No.	Date	Location	Winner	Score
23	Oct 12, 1977	UW	Washington	1–0
24	Nov 16, 1977	SU	Washington	4–1
25	Oct 14, 1978	UW	Tie	2–2
26	Oct 25, 1978	SU	Washington	2–1
27	Oct 10, 1979	SU	Seattle U	2–1
28	Oct 24, 1979	N	Washington	3–0
29	Oct 8, 1980	UW	Washington	2–0
30	Oct 25, 1980	SU	Washington	3–1
31	Sep 5, 1981	N	Washington	4–0
32	Sep 30, 1981	UW	Washington	9–1
33	Oct 17, 1981	SU	Washington	1–0
34	Sep 22, 1982	UW	Washington	3–0
35	Oct 16, 1982	SU	Washington	2–0
36	Oct 15, 1983	SU	Washington	6–0
37	Nov 5, 1983	UW	Washington	3–1
38	Oct 10, 1984	UW	Washington	5–0
39	Nov 3, 1984	SU	Washington	6–0
40	Oct 30, 1985	UW	Washington	6–0
41	Sep 24, 1986	SU	Washington	8–1
42	Oct 25, 1987	UW	Washington	8–0
43	Sep 30, 1988	UW	Washington	4–0
44	Aug 31, 1996	SU	Seattle U	1–0

No.	Date	Location	Winner	Score
45	Sep 20, 2001	UW	Washington	3–1
46	Sep 1, 2009	SU	Washington	1–0
47	Sep 24, 2010	UW	Washington	2–0
48	Sep 11, 2011	SU	Tie	0–0
49	Sep 23, 2012	UW	Washington	2–0
50	Oct 8, 2013	SU	Washington	2–0
51	Nov 24, 2013	UW	Washington	4–2
52	Sep 4, 2014	UW	Washington	4–1
53	Sep 25, 2015	SU	Seattle U	2–1
54	Sep 25, 2016	UW	Washington	2–1
55	Sep 24, 2017	SU	Washington	2–0
56	Nov 16, 2017	UW	Seattle U	3–2
57	Sep 23, 2018	UW	Seattle U	2–0
58	Sep 15, 2019	SU	Washington	3–0
59	Mar 10, 2021	UW	Washington	4–0
60	Sep 20, 2021	UW	Washington	2–1
61	Sep 20, 2022	UW	Washington	4–0
62	Sep 21, 2023	SU	Seattle U	3–2
63	Sep 9, 2024	UW	Washington	2–1
64	Nov 21, 2024	UW	Tie	0–0
65	Sep 8, 2025	SU	Washington	7–2
Series: Washington leads 50–9–6

== See also ==
- Milwaukee Cup and Rowdies Cup, two similar city cup tournaments
