= Jaret Townsend =

American soccer player

Personal information
- Full name: Jaret Townsend
- Date of birth: January 29, 1998 (age 28)
- Place of birth: Highlands Ranch, Colorado, United States
- Height: 5 ft 11 in (1.80 m)
- Position: Winger

Youth career
- 2015–2016: Real Colorado

College career
Years	Team	Apps	(Gls)
2016–2019	Washington Huskies	75	(9)

Senior career*
Years	Team	Apps	(Gls)
2017	Colorado Rapids U23	11	(4)
2019	Crossfire Redmond	10	(3)
2020	Sporting Kansas City II	11	(0)
- * Club domestic league appearances and goals as of October 6, 2020

Jaret Townsend (born January 29, 1998) is an American soccer player.

== Career ==
=== Youth, college & amateur ===
Townsend spent a season with USSDA side Real Colorado prior to attending college.

Townsend went on to play four years of college soccer at the University of Washington between 2016 and 2019, where he made a total of 75 appearances for the Huskies, scoring 9 goals and tallying 6 assists.

While at college, Townsend played with USL PDL side Colorado Rapids U23 in 2017, and NPSL side Crossfire Redmond in 2019.

=== Professional ===
On January 13, 2020, Townsend was selected 58th overall in the 2020 MLS SuperDraft by Sporting Kansas City. On March 6, 2020, Townsend signed with Kansas City's USL Championship side Sporting Kansas City II.

Townsend made his professional debut on July 18, 2020, appearing as an 85th-minute substitute in a 2–1 loss to Indy Eleven.

Townsend retired from professional soccer on November 30, 2020.
