= Charlie Wehan =

American soccer player

Personal information
- Full name: Charles Allen Wehan
- Date of birth: October 31, 1998 (age 27)
- Place of birth: Orange, California, United States
- Height: 5 ft 9 in (1.75 m)
- Position: Forward

Youth career
- 2014–2017: Strikers FC

College career
Years	Team	Apps	(Gls)
2017–2020	Stanford Cardinal	72	(10)

Senior career*
Years	Team	Apps	(Gls)
2021	Real Monarchs	18	(3)
- * Club domestic league appearances and goals as of November 7, 2021

Charles Allen Wehan (born October 31, 1998) is an American soccer player who plays as a forward.

== Career ==
=== Youth ===
Wehan played high school soccer at Aliso Niguel High School, where in his freshman season he was named as first team All-CIF and first team all-conference. Wehan also played club soccer with USSDA side Strikers FC between 2014 and 2017. In 2016–17, he was tied for ninth nationally with 21 goals in 34 appearances.

=== College ===
In 2017, Wehan attended Stanford University to play college soccer. Over four seasons with the Cardinal, When made 72 appearances, scoring 10 goals and tallying 18 assists, which included only 34 starting appearances. He also earned numerous awards and accolades over his college career, including Pac-12 All-Academic Honorable Mention in 2018, a two-time Pac-12 Academic Honor Roll, a three-time All-Pac-12, and was United Soccer Coaches All-Far West Region Second Team in 2020. He was part of the Cardinal team that won the Pac-12 championship three times and was the NCAA champion in 2017.

=== Professional ===
On June 16, 2021, Wehan signed with USL Championship side Real Monarchs. He debuted for the club two days later, starting in a 2–1 loss to El Paso Locomotive.

== Honors ==
=== College ===
Stanford Cardinals

- NCAA Division I Men's Soccer Championship: 2017
- Pac-12 Conference: 2017, 2018, 2020

== Personal ==
Charlie's brother, Chris, is also a professional soccer player.
