= Tanner Beason =

American soccer player (born 1997)

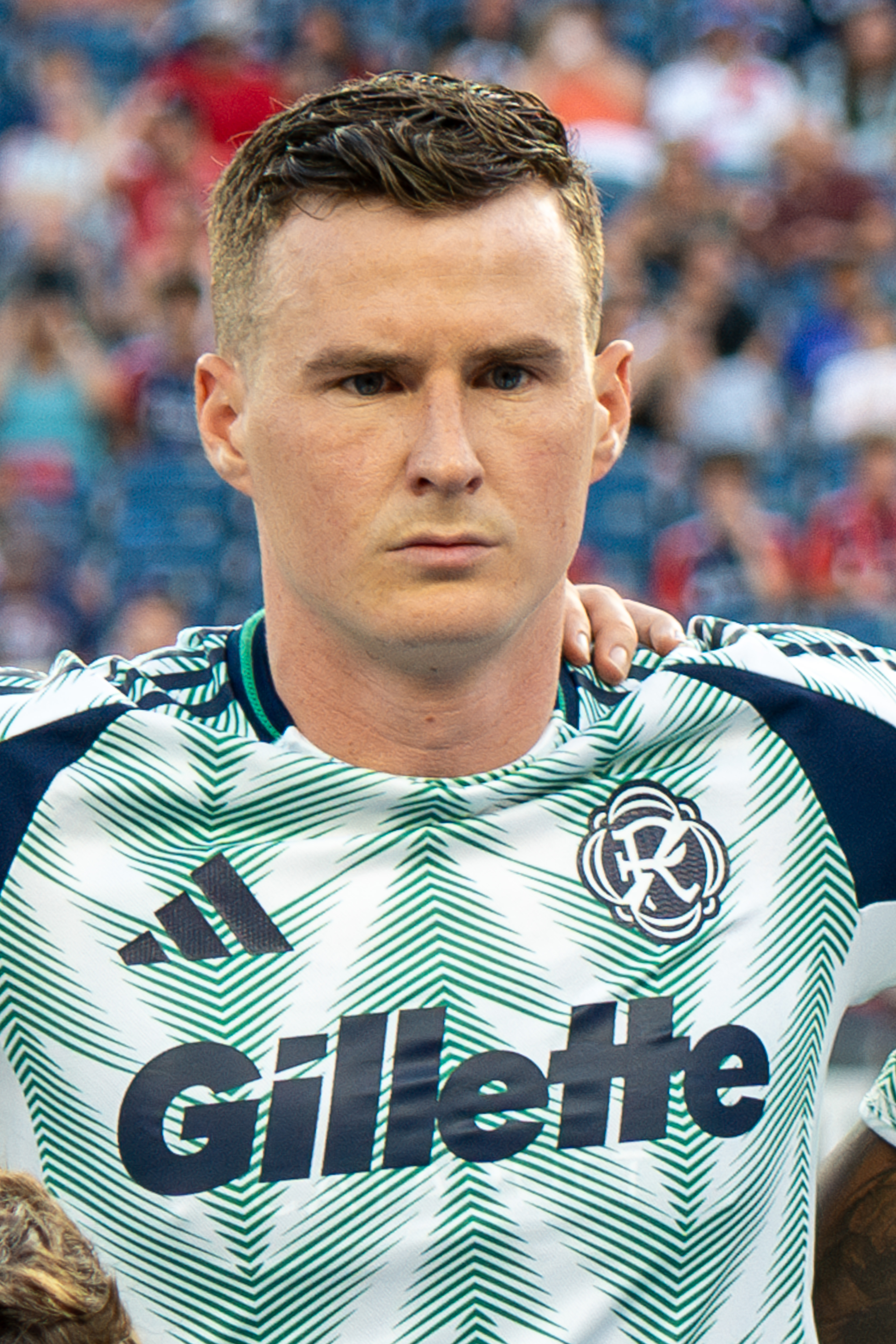
- Beason with the New England Revolution in 2025

Personal information
- Full name: James Tanner Beason
- Date of birth: March 23, 1997 (age 29)
- Place of birth: Winston-Salem, North Carolina, United States
- Height: 6 ft 1 in (1.85 m)
- Position: Defender

Team information
- Current team: New England Revolution
- Number: 4

Youth career
- 2011–2015: North Carolina Fusion

College career
| Years | Team | Apps | (Gls) |
| 2016–2019 | Stanford Cardinal | 81 | (20) |

Senior career*
| Years | Team | Apps | (Gls) |
| 2016 | North Carolina Fusion U23 | 4 | (0) |
| 2018–2019 | San Francisco City | 5 | (0) |
| 2020–2024 | San Jose Earthquakes | 110 | (0) |
| 2025– | New England Revolution | 10 | (0) |
- * Club domestic league appearances and goals as of 1 June 2025

James Tanner Beason (born March 23, 1997) is an American professional soccer player who plays as a defender for Major League Soccer club New England Revolution.

== Career ==
=== Youth, college and amateur ===
Beason played as part of the USSDA academy side North Carolina Fusion, before heading to Stanford University in 2015 to play college soccer. After redshirting in 2015, Beason went on to play four seasons with the Cardinals, making 81 appearances, scoring 20 goals and tallying 11 assists. Beason was an NCAA National Champion three times (2015, 2016, 2017), First Team All-American twice (2018, 2019), First Team All-Pac-12 twice (2017, 2018), and the Pac-12 Player of the Year (2018). Beason was also a MAC Hermann Trophy semifinalists in both 2018 and 2019.

While at college, Beason appeared for USL League Two side North Carolina Fusion U23 in 2016, and San Francisco City in both 2018 and 2019.

=== Professional ===
On December 30, 2019, Beason signed a senior contract with MLS ahead of the 2020 MLS SuperDraft. On January 9, 2020, Beason was selected 12th overall in the SuperDraft by San Jose Earthquakes. Beason made his professional debut on August 29, 2020, starting in a 3–2 loss to LA Galaxy. On November 24, 2024, the Earthquakes elected not to exercise Beason's contract option, and he became a free agent heading into the 2025 season. In his five seasons in San Jose, Beason made 121 professional appearances as a center back and outside back.

==== New England Revolution ====
December 20, 2024, Beason signed with the New England Revolution on a two-year deal, with a club option for 2027. He made his Revolution debut on March 29, coming on as a 37th-minute substitute for Wyatt Omsberg. Deployed as a center back, Beason made his first full start for the Revolution on April 12, playing the full match in a 1-0 win over Atlanta United.
