= Logan Panchot =

American soccer player

Personal information
- Full name: Logan Charles Panchot
- Date of birth: July 8, 1998 (age 28)
- Place of birth: Napa, California, U.S.
- Height: 5 ft 10 in (1.78 m)
- Positions: Defender; midfielder

Youth career
- 2006–2017: St. Louis Scott Gallagher

College career
Years	Team	Apps	(Gls)
2017–2020	Stanford Cardinal	62	(3)

Senior career*
Years	Team	Apps	(Gls)
2019	San Francisco City	3	(1)
2021	Loudoun United	7	(1)

International career^{‡}
2013	United States U15	3	(0)
2013–2014	United States U17	6	(1)
2016	United States U19	0	(0)
- * Club domestic league appearances and goals as of October 25, 2021 ‡ National team caps and goals as of May 2, 2021

Logan Charles Panchot (born July 8, 1998) is an American former soccer player. He is now the founder of Clear Contracts, an early stage start up that specializes in making an easy way for businesses to adopt blockchain technology.

== Career ==
=== Youth, College & Amateur ===
Panchot was born in Napa, California, but grew up in St. Louis, Missouri. Here he was part of the St. Louis Scott Gallagher academy for over 10 years. In 2017, Panchot went to play college soccer at Stanford University. Here he made 62 appearances, scoring 3 goals and tallying 11 assists over 3 seasons with the Cardinal. The 2020 season was cancelled due to the COVID-19 pandemic. Whilst at Stanford, Panchot was NCAA champion in 2017, a two-time Pac-12 champion, a two-time All-Pac-12, and was on the Pac-12 Academic Honor Roll.

In 2019, Panchot also played in the USL League Two with San Francisco City.

=== Professional ===
On January 21, 2021, Panchot was selected 32nd overall in the 2021 MLS SuperDraft by D.C. United. On April 30, 2021, he signed with D.C. United's USL Championship side Loudoun United. He made his professional debut on May 2, 2021, starting against Miami FC. He scored his first goal for Loudoun on June 2, 2021, in a 2–3 loss against the Pittsburgh Riverhounds.

On July 19, 2021, Panchot was released from Loudoun United "to pursue non-soccer opportunities".

== Personal ==
Logan's brother Austin, is also a professional soccer player.
