= 2017 PDL season =

USL Premier Development League
- Season: 2017
- Champion: Charlotte Eagles (1st Title)
- Regular Season Champions: New York Red Bulls U-23 (1st Title)
- Matches: 522 (504 RS, 18 PO)
- Goals: 1,746 (3.34 per match) (1695 RS, 51 PO)
- Best player: (United States) Brian White New York Red Bulls U-23
- Top goalscorer: (United States) Brian White New York Red Bulls U-23 (17 Goals)
- Best goalkeeper: (United States) Ben Lundgaard New York Red Bulls U-23
- Biggest home win: WMP 7, WCF 0 (July 14); JER 7, FAE 0 (July 15)
- Biggest away win: NYRB 10, EVR 1 (June 24)
- Highest scoring: VIL 8, TBR 3 (June 8); NYRB 10, EVR 1 (June 24); SCU 7, ACC 4 (July 16)
- Longest winning run: 9, OKC Energy U23 (May 13 - June 17)
- Longest unbeaten run: 12, Michigan Bucks (May 27 - end of season)
- Longest winless run: 12, WSA Winnipeg (May 20 - July 7)
- Longest losing run: 8, Evergreen FC (June 6 - July 15); GPS Portland Phoenix (June 19 - July 12); Weston FC (May 24 - June 19)
- All statistics correct as of August 5, 2017.

The 2017 USL Premier Development League season is the 23rd season of the PDL. The league consisted of 72 teams playing in 10 divisions. The Michigan Bucks entered the season as the defending champions, but their title defense campaign ended with a loss in the Central Conference semi-finals. On August 5, 2017, the Charlotte Eagles won their first PDL championship by defeating the Thunder Bay Chill 2-1.

== Changes from 2016 ==
=== New Teams ===
Team	Country	City/area	Stadium	Founded	Head coach	Notes
FC Cleburne	U.S.	Cleburne, Texas	The Depot at Cleburne Station	2017	Paul Davenport	Expansion
FC Boulder U23	U.S.	Boulder, Colorado	Pleasant View Fields Sports Complex	2017	Luis Swisher	Expansion
Brazos Valley Cavalry F.C.	U.S.	Bryan, Texas	Nutrabolt Stadium	2017	James Clarkson	Expansion
Houston FC	U.S.	Houston, Texas	Rice Track/Soccer Stadium	2017	Bruce Talbot	Expansion
Lakeland Tropics	U.S.	Lakeland, Florida	Bryant Stadium	2016	Eoghan Conlon	Expansion
Myrtle Beach Mutiny	U.S.	Myrtle Beach, South Carolina	North Myrtle Beach Park & Sports Complex	2011	Kyle Russell	NPSL
Nashville SC U23	U.S.	Nashville, Tennessee	Vanderbilt Soccer/Lacrosse Complex	2016	Kyle Roelke	Expansion
SIMA Águilas	U.S.	Montverde, Florida	Montverde Academy Center	2017	Mike Potempa	Expansion
SoCal Surf	U.S.	Carlsbad, California	Maffucci Field	2015	Cody Worden	NPSL
Tampa Bay Rowdies U-23	U.S.	Tampa, Florida	Waters Soccer Complex	2017	Keith Fulk	Expansion
Tobacco Road FC	U.S.	Durham, North Carolina	Durham County Stadium	2013	Cedric Burke	NPSL
Weston FC	U.S.	Weston, Florida	Broward College Soccer Field	1998	Victor Pastora	NPSL
Wilmington Hammerheads FC	U.S.	Wilmington, North Carolina	Legion Stadium	1996	Kevin Johnson	USL
TSS FC Rovers	Canada	Burnaby, British Columbia	Swangard Stadium	2017	Colin Elmes	Expansion

=== Name Changes ===
- FC Miami City Champions became FC Miami City
- FC Sonic Lehigh Valley became Lehigh Valley United

=== Folded/left ===
- Baltimore Bohemians – Folded
- Floridians FC – Folded
- Kitsap Pumas – renamed Kitsap SC and moved to the National Premier Soccer League
- Kokomo Mantis FC – Folded its PDL team
- LA Laguna FC – Folded
- Laredo Heat – Folded its PDL team
- Las Vegas Mobsters – moved to the United Premier Soccer League
- Midland/Odessa Sockers – renamed Midland-Odessa FC and moved to the National Premier Soccer League
- Pittsburgh Riverhounds U23 – Folded
- SW Florida Adrenaline – Folded
- Southern West Virginia King's Warriors – Folded its PDL team

== Standings ==
=== Tiebreakers ===
1. Head-to-head results
2. Goal differential
3. Goals scored

=== Central Conference ===
==== Great Lakes Division ====
Pos	Team	Pld	W	L	T	GF	GA	GD	Pts	Qualification
1	Michigan Bucks	14	10	1	3	31	9	+22	33	Advance to Central Conference Championship
2	K-W United FC	14	9	4	1	31	13	+18	28	Advance to Central Conference Championship
3	West Virginia Chaos	14	7	6	1	22	27	−5	22	
4	Cincinnati Dutch Lions	14	5	6	3	17	16	+1	18	
5	Dayton Dutch Lions	14	4	7	3	10	22	−12	15	
6	Derby City Rovers	14	1	11	2	8	31	−23	5	

Source: Premier Development League
Rules for classification: Tiebreakers

==== Heartland Division ====
Pos	Team	Pld	W	L	T	GF	GA	GD	Pts	Qualification
1	Thunder Bay Chill	14	9	3	2	26	8	+18	29	Advance to Central Conference Championship
2	Des Moines Menace	14	7	5	2	19	12	+7	23	Advance to Central Conference Championship
3	Saint Louis FC U23	14	6	4	4	16	15	+1	22	
4	St. Louis Lions	14	6	7	1	19	27	−8	19	
5	Chicago FC United	14	4	5	5	20	18	+2	17	
6	WSA Winnipeg	14	2	11	1	12	33	−21	7	

Source: Premier Development League
Rules for classification: Tiebreakers

=== Eastern Conference ===
==== Northeast Division ====
Pos	Team	Pld	W	L	T	GF	GA	GD	Pts	Qualification
1	Seacoast United Phantoms	14	11	1	2	44	20	+24	35	Advance to Eastern Conference play-in round
2	Long Island Rough Riders	14	8	2	4	28	19	+9	28	Advance to Eastern Conference play-in round
3	Western Mass Pioneers	14	8	3	3	29	16	+13	27	
4	FC Boston	14	6	5	3	24	27	−3	21	
5	GPS Portland Phoenix	14	4	9	1	29	30	−1	13	
6	AC Connecticut	14	2	10	2	19	35	−16	8	
7	Westchester Flames	14	2	11	1	14	40	−26	7	

Source: Premier Development League
Rules for classification: Tiebreakers

==== Mid Atlantic Division ====
Pos	Team	Pld	W	L	T	GF	GA	GD	Pts	Qualification
1	New York Red Bulls U-23 (R)	14	12	1	1	51	14	+37	37	Advance to Eastern Conference play-in round
2	Reading United AC	14	12	2	0	36	10	+26	36	Advance to Eastern Conference play-in round
3	Ocean City Nor'easters	14	9	4	1	26	14	+12	28	
4	Jersey Express S.C.	14	5	9	0	28	36	−8	15	
5	F.A. Euro	14	3	10	1	11	39	−28	10	
6	Lehigh Valley United	14	4	9	1	19	30	−11	9	
7	Evergreen FC	14	1	11	2	14	42	−28	5	

Source: Premier Development League
Rules for classification: Tiebreakers
(R) Regular Season Champions

==== South Atlantic Division ====
Pos	Team	Pld	W	L	T	GF	GA	GD	Pts	Qualification
1	Myrtle Beach Mutiny	14	10	1	3	38	19	+19	33	Advance to Eastern Conference Championship
2	Charlotte Eagles	14	9	3	2	30	14	+16	29	Advance to Eastern Conference Championship
3	Nashville SC U23	14	8	2	4	34	18	+16	28	
4	South Georgia Tormenta FC	14	7	3	4	34	17	+17	25	
5	SC United Bantams	14	6	4	4	20	21	−1	22	
6	Tobacco Road FC	14	6	5	3	34	31	+3	21	
7	North Carolina FC U23	14	5	7	2	22	29	−7	17	
8	Wilmington Hammerheads FC	14	3	8	3	28	43	−15	12	
9	Tri-Cities Otters	14	3	9	2	10	26	−16	11	
10	Carolina Dynamo	14	2	10	2	19	34	−15	8	
11	Peachtree City MOBA	14	2	10	2	15	34	−19	8	

Source: Premier Development League
Rules for classification: Tiebreakers

=== Southern Conference ===
==== Mid South Division ====
Pos	Team	Pld	W	L	T	GF	GA	GD	Pts	Qualification
1	OKC Energy U23	14	12	1	1	39	10	+29	37	Advance to Southern Conference Championship
2	Mississippi Brilla FC	14	9	2	3	24	10	+14	30	Advance to Southern Conference Championship
3	Brazos Valley Cavalry F.C.	14	7	6	1	30	28	+2	22	
4	Texas United	14	5	8	1	27	28	−1	16	
5	FC Cleburne	14	3	10	1	20	41	−21	10	
6	Houston FC	14	2	10	2	14	35	−21	8	

Source: Premier Development League
Rules for classification: Tiebreakers

==== Southeast Division ====
Pos	Team	Pld	W	L	T	GF	GA	GD	Pts	Qualification
1	SIMA Águilas	14	11	2	1	34	13	+21	34	Advance to Southern Conference Championship
2	FC Miami City	14	10	1	3	41	12	+29	33	Advance to Southern Conference Championship
3	Lakeland Tropics	14	9	3	2	27	20	+7	29	
4	The Villages SC	14	8	4	2	46	21	+25	26	
5	IMG Academy Bradenton	14	5	6	3	20	24	−4	18	
6	Tampa Bay Rowdies U-23	14	3	8	3	25	36	−11	12	
7	South Florida Surf	14	3	8	3	21	29	−8	12	
8	Weston FC	14	3	10	1	11	38	−27	10	
9	Palm Beach Suns FC	14	2	12	0	10	42	−32	1	

Source: Premier Development League
Rules for classification: Tiebreakers

=== Western Conference ===
==== Mountain Division ====
Pos	Team	Pld	W	L	T	GF	GA	GD	Pts	Qualification
1	FC Tucson	14	9	2	3	34	17	+17	30	Advance to Western Conference Championship
2	FC Boulder U23	14	8	4	2	24	24	0	26	
3	Colorado Rapids U-23	14	5	4	5	24	21	+3	20	
4	BYU Cougars	14	4	6	4	22	24	−2	12	
5	Albuquerque Sol FC	14	2	10	2	17	32	−15	8	

Source: Premier Development League
Rules for classification: Tiebreakers

==== Northwest Division ====
Pos	Team	Pld	W	L	T	GF	GA	GD	Pts	Qualification
1	Portland Timbers U23s	14	8	2	4	29	12	+17	28	Advance to Western Conference play-in round
2	Calgary Foothills FC	14	8	2	4	20	15	+5	28	Advance to Western Conference play-in round
3	Seattle Sounders FC U-23	14	6	7	1	22	20	+2	19	
4	Victoria Highlanders (J)	14	5	8	1	17	28	−11	16	
5	Lane United FC	14	3	6	5	21	24	−3	14	
6	TSS FC Rovers	14	3	8	3	19	29	−10	9	

Source: Premier Development League
Rules for classification: Tiebreakers
(J) Juan de Fuca Plate

==== Southwest Division ====
Pos	Team	Pld	W	L	T	GF	GA	GD	Pts	Qualification
1	FC Golden State Force	14	10	1	3	45	17	+28	33	Advance to Western Conference Championship
2	Fresno Fuego	14	10	2	2	45	19	+26	32	Advance to Western Conference Championship
3	SoCal Surf	14	8	5	1	22	15	+7	25	
4	San Francisco City FC	14	8	5	1	25	24	+1	25	
5	Burlingame Dragons FC	14	5	5	4	21	22	−1	19	
6	Southern California Seahorses	14	5	7	2	17	24	−7	17	
7	San Diego Zest FC	14	3	9	2	13	29	−16	11	
8	Ventura County Fusion	14	2	8	4	23	34	−11	10	
9	Orange County SC U-23	14	1	12	1	9	39	−30	4	

Source: Premier Development League
Rules for classification: Tiebreakers

== Playoffs ==
Divisional Qualification	Conference Semifinals
SW1	FC Golden State Force	3
NW1	Portland Timbers U23s	1
NW1	Portland Timbers U23s	3
NW2	Calgary Foothills FC	0
Western Conference
SW2	Fresno Fuego	1
MT1	FC Tucson	0
GL1	Michigan Bucks	0
HL2	Des Moines Menace	2
Central Conference
HL1	Thunder Bay Chill	2
GL2	K-W United FC	0
SA1	Myrtle Beach Mutiny	0
NE2	Long Island Rough Riders	2
MA1	New York Red Bulls U-23	1
NE2	Long Island Rough Riders	4
Eastern Conference
NE1	Seacoast United Phantoms	3
MA2	Reading United AC	1
NE1	Seacoast United Phantoms	1
SA2	Charlotte Eagles	4*
MS1	OKC Energy U23	0
SE2	FC Miami City	1
Southern Conference
SE1	SIMA Águilas	3
MS2	Mississippi Brilla FC	4

Conference Finals
SW1	FC Golden State Force	2
SW2	Fresno Fuego	0
HL2	Des Moines Menace	0
HL1	Thunder Bay Chill	2
NE2	Long Island Rough Riders	1(2)
SA2	Charlotte Eagles	1(4)
SE2	FC Miami City	0(1)
MS2	Mississippi Brilla FC	0(3)

National Semifinals
SW1	FC Golden State Force	0
HL1	Thunder Bay Chill	1
SA2	Charlotte Eagles	3
MS2	Mississippi Brilla FC	1

National Championship
HL1	Thunder Bay Chill	1
SA2	Charlotte Eagles	2

- After extra time

=== Divisional Qualification ===
Matches in the Divisional Qualification round were held on July 18. Two Eastern Conference play-in matches were played at Amesbury, MA (Seacoast United Phantoms) and Whippany, NJ (New York Red Bulls U-23). One Western Conference play-in match was played at Salem, OR (Portland Timbers U23s).

July 18, 2017 InterDivision Qualifier	(New Jersey) New York Red Bulls U-23	1–4	(New York (state)) Long Island Rough Riders	Red Bull Training Facility; Hanover, New Jersey
7:00 PM EDT	Bowkett 80'	Report	Bedoya 16'; Sichecki 45'; Rosero 58'; Friend 90'; Foster (yellow card)

July 18, 2017 InterDivision Qualifier	(New Hampshire) Seacoast United Phantoms	3–1	(Pennsylvania) Reading United AC	Amesbury Sports Park; Amesbury, Massachusetts
7:00 PM EDT	Sackie 17' (yellow card); Blaskic 22'; Jepson 26'; Carter (yellow card)	Report	Molloy 40'; Brown (yellow card) (yellow-red card); Aguilar (yellow card); Finnegan (yellow card)

July 18, 2017 Northwest Division Qualifier	(Oregon) Portland Timbers U23s	3–0	(Alberta) Calgary Foothills FC	McCulloch Stadium; Salem, Oregon
7:00 PM PDT	Amorosino 37'; Michel 43'; Magana 74'	Report	Pasquotti (yellow card); Zebie (yellow card); Sarkaria (yellow card); King (yellow card)

=== Conference Championships ===
The PDL Conference Championships were held over the weekend of July 21–23. Matches were played at: Tucson, AZ (Western Conference, host FC Tucson); Statesboro, GA (Eastern Conference, host South Georgia Tormenta FC); Pontiac, MI (Central Conference, host Michigan Bucks); and Clinton, MS (Southern Conference, host Mississippi Brilla FC). The four conference champions advanced to the PDL semifinals.

=== Eastern Conference ===
July 22, 2017 Conference Semifinal	(South Carolina) Myrtle Beach Mutiny	0–2	(New York (state)) Long Island Rough Riders	Erk Russell Park; Statesboro, Georgia
6:00 PM EDT		Report	Bosua 65'; Rosero 90'

July 22, 2017 Conference Semifinal	(North Carolina) Charlotte Eagles	4–1 (a.e.t.)	(New Hampshire) Seacoast United Phantoms	Erk Russell Park; Statesboro, Georgia
8:30 PM EDT	Costa 75', 94', 108', 112'; Page (yellow card); Oliveira (yellow card); Williams (yellow card); Appiah (yellow card)	Report	Sackie 51'; Blaskic (yellow card) (yellow-red card); Momoh (yellow card)

July 23, 2017 Conference Final	(North Carolina) Charlotte Eagles	1–1 (a.e.t.) (4–2 p)	(New York (state)) Long Island Rough Riders	Erk Russell Park; Statesboro, Georgia
8:00 PM EDT	Williams 45+' (pen.)	Report	Bedoya 83'
	Penalties
	Williams (penalty scored); John-Brown (penalty scored); Mwape (penalty scored); Oliveira (penalty scored)		(penalty scored) Bedoya; (penalty scored) Morrison

=== Southern Conference ===
July 21, 2017 Conference Semifinal	(Oklahoma) OKC Energy U23	0–1	(Florida) FC Miami City	Clinton High School; Clinton, Mississippi
5:00 PM CDT		Report	Mourchild 18'; Hamdi (yellow card)

July 21, 2017 Conference Semifinal	Mississippi Brilla FC	4–3	(Florida) SIMA Aguilas	Clinton High School; Clinton, Mississippi
7:30 PM CDT	Palmer 37'; Garces 49'; Bryan 75'; Hocine 88'; Kelly (yellow card); Bourrier (yellow card); Bryan (yellow card); Campos (yellow card)	Report	Santos 29'; Lapa 49'; Mbaye 83' (red card); Novaes (yellow card) (yellow-red card); Patino (yellow card)

July 22, 2017 Conference Final	Mississippi Brilla FC	0–0 (a.e.t.) (3–1 p)	(Florida) FC Miami City	Clinton High School; Clinton, Mississippi
7:00 PM CDT	Garces (yellow card); Campos (yellow card)	Report	Sonis (yellow card); Chahti (yellow card); Abdallah (yellow card) (yellow-red card) 85'
	Penalties
	Garces (penalty missed); Skelton (penalty scored); Kelly (penalty scored); Bryan (penalty scored)		(penalty scored) Colino; (penalty missed) Warton; (penalty missed) Mouri; (penalty missed) Kourouma

=== Central Conference ===
July 21, 2017 Conference Semifinal	(Ontario) Thunder Bay Chill	2–0	(Ontario) K-W United FC	Ultimate Soccer Arenas; Pontiac, Michigan
5:00 PM EDT	Villon; Silva (yellow card); Arce (yellow card)	Report	Longo (yellow card) (yellow-red card); Callahan (yellow card)

July 21, 2017 Conference Semifinal	(Michigan) Michigan Bucks	0–2	(Iowa) Des Moines Menace	Ultimate Soccer Arenas; Pontiac, Michigan
7:30 PM EDT	de Oliveira (yellow card); Souahy (yellow card)	Report	Howell 69'; Madrid 82'; Gibson (yellow card)

July 22, 2017 Conference Final	(Ontario) Thunder Bay Chill	2–0	(Iowa) Des Moines Menace	Ultimate Soccer Arenas; Pontiac, Michigan
7:30 PM EDT	Osmond 8' (yellow card); Makengo 44'; Sanchez (yellow card); Abdellaoui (yellow card)	Report	Trosten (yellow card); Parrish (yellow card); Puster (yellow card); Madrid (yellow card)

=== Western Conference ===
July 21, 2017 Conference Semifinal	(California) FC Golden State Force	3–1	(Oregon) Portland Timbers U23s	Kino Sports Complex; Tucson, Arizona
6:00 PM MDT	Garcia 7', 51'; Ruiz 9'; Fonseca (yellow card); Koenig (yellow card)	Report	Dal Molin 48'; Spurr (yellow card); Ochoa (yellow card)

July 21, 2017 Conference Semifinal	(Arizona) FC Tucson	0–1	(California) Fresno Fuego	Kino Sports Complex; Tucson, Arizona
8:00 PM MDT	Perez (yellow card)	Report	Bustamante 32'; Nus (yellow card); Blanco (yellow card); Campos (yellow card); Casillas (yellow card)

July 22, 2017 Conference Final	(California) FC Golden State Force	2–0	(California) Fresno Fuego	Kino Sports Complex; Tucson, Arizona
7:00 PM MDT	Goal	Report

=== PDL Championship ===
The PDL semifinals were held on July 29, with matches played at Charlotte, NC (Charlotte Eagles) and Thunder Bay, ON (Thunder Bay Chill). The PDL Championship Game was held on August 5 in Matthews, NC (Charlotte Eagles).

=== Semi-finals ===
July 29, 2017	(North Carolina) Charlotte Eagles	3–1	(Mississippi) Mississippi Brilla FC	Sportsplex at Matthews; Matthews, North Carolina
7:00 PM EDT	Omondi 31'; Sibisi 62'; Williams 79'; Oliveira (yellow card); John-Brown (yellow card); Mwape (yellow card)	Report	Skelton 70' (yellow card)	Attendance: 1,112; Referee: Charles Spaniola

July 29, 2017	(Ontario) Thunder Bay Chill	1–0	(California) FC Golden State Force	Fort William Stadium; Thunder Bay, Ontario
7:30 PM PDT	Mastrantonio 58'; Sanchez (yellow card); Abdellaoui (red card) 77'	Report 1Report 2	Oliveira (yellow card); Candelaria (yellow card); Koenig (yellow card) (yellow-red card); Santana (yellow card)	Attendance: 1,862

=== Championship Game ===
August 5, 2017	(North Carolina) Charlotte Eagles	2–1	(Ontario) Thunder Bay Chill	Sportsplex at Matthews; Matthews, North Carolina
3:00pm EDT	Costa 26'; Williams 61'; Page (yellow card); Petrovic (yellow card); Sibisi; Pyle (yellow card)	Report	Arce 21'	Attendance: 1,356 or 1,427

Championship MVP: (United States) Ryan Williams (CHE)

== Awards ==
- Most Valuable Player: (United States) Brian White (NYR)
- Golden Boot: (United States) Brian White (NYR)
- Young (U21) Player of the Year: (Republic of Ireland) Aaron Molloy (REA)
- Coach of the Year: (United States) Robert Elliott (NYR)
- Goalkeeper of the Year: (United States) Ben Lundgaard (NYR)
- Defender of the Year: (Australia) Mitch Osmond (TBC)
- Creative Player of the Year: (England) Harry Pearse (JER)

=== Monthly Awards ===
Goal of the Month
Month	Player	Club	Opponent	Ref.
May	(Spain) Ignacio Tellechea	Ocean City Nor'easters	Evergreen FC	
June	(United States) Jack Fasteen	Derby City Rovers	Nashville SC U23	
July	(United States) Jad Arslan	South Georgia Tormenta FC	Peachtree City MOBA	

Save of the Month
Month	Player	Club	Opponent	Ref.
May	(United States) Jackson Hawthorne	Tobacco Road FC	Carolina Dynamo	
June	(Brazil) Lucas Vallilo	FC Tucson	San Diego Zest FC	
July	(United States) Ben Willis	Lane United FC	Portland Timbers U23s	

=== Weekly Awards ===
Player of the Week
Week	Player	Club	Position	Reason	Ref.
1	(United States) Blake Frischknecht	BYU Cougars	Forward	2 goals in win against FC Tucson	
2	(Brazil) Joao Costa	Charlotte Eagles	Forward	Hat-trick vs Wilmington Hammerheads FC	
3	(United States) Matt Wiesenfarth	Burlingame Dragons FC	Forward	4 goals in win against San Francisco City FC	
4	(United States) David Garcia	Myrtle Beach Mutiny	Goalkeeper	12 saves against Charlotte Eagles	
5	(England) Luke Brown	GPS Portland Phoenix	Forward	4 goals, 2 assists in pair of wins against the Long Island Rough Riders and Westchester Flames	
6	(Brazil) Willian Hopfner	The Villages SC	Midfielder	4 goals in 2 wins against Tampa Bay Rowdies U23 and IMG Academy Bradenton	
7	(Honduras) Julio Moncada	OKC Energy U23	Forward	3 goals, 1 assist in 2 wins against Houston FC and Brazos Valley Cavalry FC	
8	(England) Harry Pearse	Jersey Express SC	Midfielder	2 goals, 4 assists in 2 wins over FA Euro New York, and Lehigh Valley United	
9	(Nigeria) Tobenna Uzo	Myrtle Beach Mutiny	Forward	4 goals, 1 assist in pair of wins over Charlotte Eagles and Wilmington Hammerheads FC	
10	(United States) Jaret Townsend	Colorado Rapids U-23	Forward	3 goals, 3 assists in 2 wins vs BYU Cougars and Albuquerque Sol FC	
11	(Israel) Moshe Perez	FC Tucson	Forward	4 goals, 1 assist in 3 games vs BYU Cougars twice, and Colorado Rapids U-23	

Goal of the Week
Week	Player	Club	Opponent	Ref.
1/2	(United States) DeJuan Jones	Lansing United	Michigan Bucks	
3	(South Korea) Lee Seong Yeon	San Diego Zest FC	San Francisco City FC	
4	(Algeria) Sami Guediri	SIMA Aguilas	FC Miami City	
5	(Netherlands) Daniël Krutzen	Reading United AC	New York Red Bulls U23	
6	(France) Killian Colombie	AHFC Royals	Houston FC	
7	(Spain) Guillermo Segovia	Tri-Cities Otters	Peachtree City MOBA	
8	(Canada) Austin Ricci	Michigan Bucks	Lansing United	
9	(Haiti) Fredlin Mompremier	Ocean City Nor'easters	FA Euro New York	
10	(Spain) Toni Soler	South Georgia Tormenta FC	Birmingham Hammers	
11	(United States) Elijah Agu	SIMA Aguilas	Next Academy Palm Beach	
Conference Playoffs	(United States) Adrian Valenzuela	FC Tucson	FC Golden State Force	
National Playoffs	(Canada) Dominick Zator	Calgary Foothills FC	Reading United AC	

Save of the Week
1/2	(United States) Joseph Rice	Lionsbridge FC	Lane United FC
3	(Brazil) Giovani Rello	Black Rock FC	Westchester Flames
4	(United States) Zachary Nelson	Portland Timbers U23s	Calgary Foothills FC
5	(Colombia) Federico Barrios	Dayton Dutch Lions	Derby City Rovers
6	(Brazil) Gustavo Vasconcelos	Lakeland Tropics	FC Florida U23
7	(United States) Casey Clark	St. Louis Lions	Chicago FC United
8	(United States) Bobby Edwards	SC United Bantams	Carolina Dynamo
9	(United States) Kevin Peach	San Francisco Glens SC	FC Golden State Force
10	(United States) Joseph Rice	Lionsbridge FC	Carolina Dynamo
11	(United States) Konrad Dziedzic	Peachtree City MOBA	Mississippi Brilla FC
Conference Playoffs	(Netherlands) Ritchie Steinmann	SIMA Aguilas	Brazos Valley Cavalry FC
National Playoffs	(United States) Timothy McGlynn	The Villages SC	Reading United AC

Team of the Week
Week	Goalkeeper	Defenders	Midfielders	Forwards	Honorable Mentions	Ref.
1	(United States) Ottman (BYU)	(United States) Santana (GSF) (Spain) Nus (FRE) (United States) Brewster (SFC) (United States) Rude (SDZ)	(Brazil) Nogueira (GSF) (Canada) K. Jones (CGY) (Japan) Omata (SDZ)	(Canada) Sarkaria (CGY) (United States) Frischknecht (BYU) (United States) Cuevas (FRE)	F – (United States) McGrath (SDZ); F – (Ghana) Oduro (GSF); F – (United States) McLaughlin (BYU); GK – (Cuba) Miranda (GSF)	
2	(United States) Kam (VCF)	(Sweden) Mauritzon (ENY) (France) Parpeix (MIA) (Canada) Montgomery (VIC)	(France) Delhommelle (REA) (Portugal) Galvão (NAS) (Ghana) Atuahene (MIB) (United States) Chica (FRE)	(England) Keats (OKC) (Brazil) Costa (CHE) (United States) Botte (LIR)	F – (United States) Ray (TOB); M – (South Korea) Kim (GSF); M – (United States) Winn (TOB); F – (Colombia) Patiño (SIM); GK – (Germany) Hoefs (SUP)	
3	(France) Martinez (WMP)	(United States) Stalboerger (SOC) (United States) Antley (SEA) (France) Coiffic (MIA)	(Spain) Tellechea (OCN) (United States) Williams (CHE) (Mexico) Carrera-García (GSF) (United States) Guzman (TEX)	(Nigeria) Uzo (MYB) (Canada) Aborig (KWU) (United States) Wiesenfarth (BUR)	F – (Colombia) Patiño (SIM); M – (Netherlands) Krutzen (TUC); F – (United States) Amorosino (POR); M – (Canada) Verhoven (TSS); F – (Honduras) Moncada (OKC); F – (United States) White (NYR); F – (United States) Arnone (LIR); D – (Jamaica) Morrison (LIR); GK – (United States) Vitiello (JER); F – (Guinea) Guirassy (JER); F – (England) Mobbs (JER); F – (Venezuela) Rojas (LAK); F – (United States) Tagaloa (SDZ); F – (United States) Pizarro (SOC); M – (United States) Ibarra (WVC); M – (United States) Carter (SUP); GK – (Canada) St. Clair (KWU); D – (United States) Stauffer (DMM)	
4	(United States) Garcia (MYB)	(Denmark) Nielsen (NAS) (United States) Fabian (WMP) (United States) Teixeira (NYR)	(United States) Bronstorph (HOU) (Israel) Perez (TUC) (United States) Mueller (CHI) (United States) Goss (COL)	(Costa Rica) Campos (SIM) (England) Gainford (STL) (Brazil) Diegues (LAK)	GK – (United States) Lundgaard (NYR); F – (Ghana) Atuahene (MIB); M – (United States) Fankhauser (BYU); F – (United States) White (NYR); F – (England) Brown (GPP); F – (United States) Avila (IMG); F – (United States) Rutherford (NCA); F – (Kenya) Omondi (CHE); F – (United States) Moon (LNU); M – (United States) Cuevas (FRE); F – (Spain) Bakero (CAR); F – (Republic of Ireland) Cojocov (SLL); D – (Trinidad and Tobago) Marcano (MYB); M – (France) Delhommelle (REA); F – (Brazil) Fonseca (GSF); F – (United States) Kennedy (SFC); D – (United States) Antley (SEA); D – (England) King (SEA); F – (United States) Segbers (CHI)	
5	(Austria) Prieur (BUR)	(Jamaica) Bell (OKC) (United States) Fordham (BYU) (Bermuda) Hill (SIM)	(Somalia) Musse (CGY) (United States) Long (EVG) (Canada) Cair (KWU) (Brazil) Ramos (SFC)	(United States) Milien (WVC) (United States) Knudson (NYR) (England) Brown (GPP)	GK – (South Africa) Naude (GPP); GK – (United States) Pyle (CHE); GK – (Germany) Lundt (REA); GK – (United States) Finney (IMG); F – (United States) Jones (LNU); M – (United States) Thomas (DCR); F – (England) Walshaw (SCU); F – (Costa Rica) Campos (SIM); F – (United States) Roberts (WIL); F – (Netherlands) Krutzen (TUC); F – (Honduras) Moncada (OKC); F – (United States) Verso (GSF); F – (United States) Garner (TOB); D – (Denmark) Nielsen (NAS); F – (Spain) Bakero (CAR); F – (United States) Melink (CIN); F – (United States) Pizarro (SOC)	
6	(United States) Shepherd (MIB)	(Canada) Miller (KWU) (Serbia) Fimic (OCN) (United States) Davis (WES)	(Canada) Jones (SEA) (United States) Vargas (SOC) (Brazil) Hopfner (VIL) (England) Conway (OKC)	(United States) Merriam (SGT) (Haiti) Pierrot (REA) (United States) Verso (GSF)	F – (United States) D. Jones (MYB); M – (United States) Palomino (BVC); GK – (United States) Morton (OCN); F – (Republic of Ireland) Cojocov (SLL); F – (Germany) Löbe (KWU); M – (United States) Ray (TOB); F – (United States) White (NYR); M – (Brazil) Ramos (SFC); F – (France) Leroux (VIL); M – (Peru) Bustamante (FRE); F – (England) Landell (MIB); F – (England) Greenway-Tambini (ACC); F – (United States) Ruiz (WMP); M – (Liberia) Sackie (SUP); F – (England) Noel (BOU); GK – (United States) Gavigan (COL)	
7	(Brazil) Vallilo (TUC)	(France) Rose (LVU) (France) Coiffic (MIA) (United States) Padilla (SFC) (Egypt) Salem (ABU)	(United States) Blanco (FRE) (United States) Jepson (SUP) (United States) Partain (DMM)	(Colombia) Garces (TRI) (United States) White (NYR) (Honduras) Moncada (OKC)	GK – (United States) Rosenberg (SGT); M – (United States) Gómez (MYB); M – (Japan) Kadano (OCU); F – (South Africa) Bosua (LIR); F – (United States) Jambga (DMM); F – (United States) Amorosino (POR); F – (Brazil) Diegues (LAK); F – (France) Mourchid (MIA); F – (Guinea) Kourouma (MIA); F – (France) Parpeix (MIA); F – (Canada) Davidson (TSS); F – (United States) Melink (CIN); F – (United States) Mueller (CHI); F – (England) Lofts (SGT); F – (Canada) Boulajoul (MIS)	
8	(United States) Rey (FRE)	(Brazil) Torres (VIL) (United States) Borges (NYR) (United States) Hundelt (SLL)	(Republic of Ireland) Molloy (REA) (England) Pearse (JER) (Germany) Bruening (TOB) (United States) Sierakowski (CHI)	(Nigeria) Ozumba (BVC) (Canada) Russo (CGY) (United States) Swartz (BOS)	F – (United States) Padilla (SFC); D – (United States) Clark (JER); F – (France) Leroux (VIL); M – (United States) Rivera (TEX); M – (United States) Fidler (PCM); F – (England) Kelly (MIS); F – (Nigeria) Uzo (MYB); F – (United States) Michel (POR); GK – (United States) Christiansen (SCS); F – (United States) Swartzendruber (TBC); M – (United States) Cuevas (FRE); F – (Brazil) Paiva (SUP); F – (North Macedonia) Musovski (TUC); F – (Republic of Ireland) Cojocov (SLL); M – (Canada) Polisi (TSS)	
9	(United States) Elias (TBC)	(Jamaica) Morrison (LIR) (Brazil) Brumati (FRE) (Australia) Leddy (CIN)	(United States) Panchot (STL) (United States) Michaelson (POR) (United States) Brinkman (NCA) (Spain) Aguinaga (NYR)	(United States) Uzo (MYB) (Japan) Kinoshita (BOU) (England) Ayris (WES)	F – (United States) Byabusha (WES); M – (United States) Spaulding (NCA); F – (United States) Merriam (SGT); M – (Japan) Krolicki (KWU); F – (Jamaica) Bennett (REA); F – (United States) Smythe (CIN); D – (United States) Moore (WMP); M – (United States) Moshin (PBS); M – (United States) Ainscough (BOS); M – (United States) Timmer (MIB)	
10	(Curaçao) la Paz (CIN)	(Comoros) Souahy (MIB) (Republic of Ireland) Finnegan (REA) (United States) VanCompernolle (OKC)	(United States) Arslan (SGT) (England) Kirkland (SFC) (France) Villez (WMP) (Ghana) Ohin (WSA)	(United States) Townsend (COL) (Japan) Kinoshita (BOU) (United States) T. Langlois (SIM)	F – (United States) Paynter (NAS); F – (Mexico) Botello (TEX); F – (United States) Ryan (TEX); F – (United States) Wilson (NAS); F – (Haiti) Pierrot (REA); M – (Brazil) Junior (WMP); F – (United States) E. Langlois (SIM); F – (United States) Wiesenfarth (BUR); F – (United States) Verso (GSF); F – (Brazil) Parreiras (LAK); GK – (France) Bouillennec (REA)	
11	(United States) Farr (POR)	(Australia) Osmond (TBC) (United States) Griffin (SOC) (Denmark) Thomsen (BOU)	(United States) Goodwin (STL) (United States) Diaz (CLE) (United States) Wright (TOB) (England) Watt (WVC)	(United States) White (NYR) (Canada) Danto (WSA) (Israel) Perez (TUC)	F – (Guinea) Kourouma (MIA); F – (Brazil) Costa (CHE); F – (United States) Botte (LIR); F – (Canada) Nelson (VIC); M – (United States) O'Keefe (SCS); F – (Brazil) Rodrigues (WMP); F – (England) Bevan (MIB); F – (United States) Criollo (JER); M – (United States) Diaz (CLE); F – (United States) Verso (GSF); F – (Brazil) Fonseca (GSF); F – (England) Carter (SUP)	

== All-League and All-Conference Teams ==
=== Eastern Conference ===
F: (Nigeria) Tobenna Uzo (MYB) *, (United States) Brian White (NYR) *, (Brazil) Joao Costa (CHE)
M: (United States) Ricardo Gomez (MYB) *, (Republic of Ireland) Aaron Molloy (REA) *, (Portugal) Martim Galvão (NAS)
D: (Brazil) Douglas Oliveira (CHE), (England) Alex Nelson (MYB), (United States) Kevin Politz (NYR), (Hungary) Daniel Kozma (OCN)
G: (United States) Ben Lundgaard (NYR) *

=== Central Conference ===
F: (United States) Ryan Sierakowski (CHI), (England) Samuel Gainford (STL), (Ghana) Francis Atuahene (MIB)
M: (United States) Abraham Villon (TBC), (Ghana) Amass Amankona (DDL), (United States) Chris Mueller (CHI)
D: (Australia) Mitch Osmond (TBC) *, (Trinidad and Tobago) Nick Walker (MIB) *, (United States) Lucas Stauffer (DMM), (United States) Brandon Fricke (DMM)
G: (United States) Michael Yantz (DDL)

=== Western Conference ===
F: (United States) Mark Verso (GSF) *, (Japan) Ryosuke Kinoshita (FCB), (United States) Jose Cuevas (FRE)
M: (Israel) Moshe Perez (TUC) *, (United States) Christo Michaelson (POR), (Mexico) José Carrera-García (GSF)
D: (Spain) Sergi Nus (FRE) *, (United States) Scott DeVoss (COL) *, (Japan) Sho Goto (VIC), (Netherlands) Wouter Verstraaten (POR)
G: (United States) Jordan Farr (POR)

=== Southern Conference ===
F: (Guinea) Mohamed Kourouma (MIA), (Brazil) Ricardo Diegues (LAK), (Honduras) Julio Moncada (OKC)
M: (Mexico) Kevin Varela (TBR), (Brazil) Willian Hopfner (VIL), (Honduras) Angelo Kelly-Rosales (MIS)
D: (France) Kevin Coiffic (MIA), (France) Jonathan Parpeix (MIA), (Brazil) Gabriel Torres (VIL), (French Guiana) Thomas Vancaeyezeele (MIS)
G: (United States) Eric Dick (OKC)

* denotes All-League player

=== All-League Team ===
F: (Nigeria) Tobenna Uzo (MYB), (United States) Brian White (NYR) (MVP and Golden Boot), (United States) Mark Verso (GSF)
M: (Israel) Moshe Perez (TUC), (United States) Ricardo Gomez (MYB), (Republic of Ireland) Aaron Molloy (REA) (Young (U21) Player of the Year)
D: (Australia) Mitch Osmond (TBC) (Defender of the Year), (Trinidad and Tobago) Nick Walker (MIB), (Spain) Sergi Nus (FRE), (United States) Scott DeVoss (COL)
G: (United States) Ben Lundgaard (NYR) (Goalkeeper of the Year)

=== All-Playoff Team ===
F: (Brazil) Joao Costa (CHE), (Kenya) Kelvin Omondi (CHE), (Liberia) Donnett Sackie (SUP)
M: (Colombia) Carlos Garces (MIS), (United States) Ryan Williams (CHE), (United States) Abraham Villon (TBC)
D: (Brazil) Rhuan Alvarenga (GSF), (Brazil) Douglas Oliveira (CHE), (Australia) Mitch Osmond (TBC), (England) Jordan Skelton (MIS)
G: (United States) James Pyle (CHE)
