= Éric Rabésandratana =

Malagasy footballer and manager (born 1972)

Personal information
- Date of birth: 18 September 1972 (age 54)
- Place of birth: Épinay-sur-Seine, France
- Height: 1.86 m (6 ft 1 in)
- Position: Defensive midfielder

Youth career
- Saint-Ouen l'Aumône
- 1989–1990: Nancy

Senior career*
Years	Team	Apps	(Gls)
1990–1997	Nancy	231	(35)
1997–2001	Paris Saint-Germain	101	(5)
2001–2002	AEK Athens	0	(0)
2003–2004	Châteauroux	28	(1)
2004–2007	Mons	74	(6)
Total		434	(47)

International career
1991–1994	France U21 / Olympic		
2007	Madagascar	1 (Note: Not sanctioned by FIFA)	(0)

Managerial career
- 2014–2015: Miami City Champions (assistant)
- 2021–2022: Madagascar (caretaker)
- * Club domestic league appearances and goals

Éric Rabésandratana (born 18 September 1972) is a professional football manager and former player. He played mainly as a defensive midfielder and could also operate as a central defender. Born in France, he represented Madagascar internationally.

In a 17-year professional career he appeared in 191 Ligue 1 games over the course of seven seasons (15 goals), in representation of Nancy and Paris Saint-Germain.

== Club career ==
Born in Épinay-sur-Seine, Paris, Rabésandratana was brought up at AS Nancy's youth ranks, being promoted to the first team at age 18 by coach Aimé Jacquet, who would later manage the France national team. He made his Ligue 1 debut on 8 September 1990 in a 4–1 away loss against Stade Malherbe Caen, and remained an undisputed starter throughout the duration of his spell – in the 1995–96 season, the defensive-minded player scored a career-best 16 league goals as Les Chardons promoted from Ligue 2, only to be relegated the following year.

In 1997 Rabésandratana moved to Paris Saint-Germain, helping the club to the Cup, League Cup and Supercup in his debut year, and eventually gaining the club captaincy. However, with the arrival of new coach Luis Fernández, he gradually lost his importance.

On 27 July 2001 Rabésandratana was transferred to the Greek side AEK Athens, for a fee of 600 million drachmas (€1.8 million). During his time in Greece he collided with the president Chrarilaos Psomiadis, due to the player's overweight appearance throughout the season and thus he barely made any appearance. At the end of the season, he won the Cup. On 28 August 2002 his contract was terminated and Rabésandratana returned home and signed with lowly LB Châteauroux. Two years after he moved to Belgium with R.A.E.C. Mons, which he helped promote in his second year, going on to be mainly used as a substitute during his spell.

== International career ==
In 2007, Rabésandratana played for the Madagascar national team in a friendly with Toulouse FC, but this was never sanctioned by FIFA.

== Managerial career ==
Rabésandratana retired professionally in 2007 at the age of 35, and focused on obtaining his coaching degree. He began working as a manager with the under-18 team at Jeunesse Sportive Juridiction de Saint-Émilion.

In 2014, Rabésandratana co-founded the United States Champions Soccer Academy with fellow former footballer Wagneau Eloi and entrepreneur Ravy Truchot. Additionally, he served as programming director and Eloi's assistant coach of the FC Miami City Champions, a new Premier Development League expansion franchise.

In April 2021, the Malagasy Football Federation announced Rabésandratana would serve as caretaker manager for Madagascar, following Nicolas Dupuis' suspension.
