= 2019 ACC men's soccer tournament =

Soccer tournament

- Classification: Division I
- Teams: 12
- Matches: 11
- Site: Sahlen's Stadium (Final); Cary, North Carolina (Final)
- Champions: Virginia (11th title)
- Winning coach: George Gelnovatch (5th title)
- MVP: (United States) Henry Kessler (Virginia)
- Broadcast: ESPNU (Final), ACC Network Extra (all other rounds)

2019 ACC men's soccer standings
| | Conf. | | | | | Overall |
| Team | W | | L | | T | W | | L | | T |
|---|---|---|---|---|---|---|---|---|---|---|
Atlantic
| No. 5 Clemson + | 6 | – | 1 | – | 1 | 18 | – | 2 | – | 2 |
| No. 3 Wake Forest + | 6 | – | 2 | – | 0 | 16 | – | 5 | – | 2 |
| NC State + | 3 | – | 4 | – | 1 | 9 | – | 7 | – | 3 |
| No. 20 Louisville + | 3 | – | 4 | – | 1 | 10 | – | 8 | – | 2 |
| Boston College + | 2 | – | 4 | – | 2 | 9 | – | 6 | – | 3 |
| Syracuse + | 2 | – | 4 | – | 2 | 8 | – | 7 | – | 4 |
Coastal
| No. 2 Virginia ‡ | 6 | – | 1 | – | 1 | 21 | – | 1 | – | 2 |
| Pittsburgh + | 4 | – | 3 | – | 1 | 10 | – | 8 | – | 2 |
| Notre Dame + | 3 | – | 5 | – | 0 | 10 | – | 8 | – | 1 |
| North Carolina | 3 | – | 5 | – | 0 | 7 | – | 8 | – | 3 |
| No. 13 Virginia Tech + | 2 | – | 4 | – | 2 | 10 | – | 6 | – | 3 |
| Duke | 2 | – | 5 | – | 1 | 7 | – | 9 | – | 2 |
‡ – 2019 ACC Tournament champion + – Invited to the 2019 NCAA tournament; As of 17 December 2019; Rankings from United Soccer Coaches; Source:The ACC

The 2019 Atlantic Coast Conference men's soccer tournament was the 33rd edition of the ACC Men's Soccer Tournament. The tournament decided the Atlantic Coast Conference champion and guaranteed representative into the 2019 NCAA Division I Men's Soccer Tournament. The final was played at Sahlen's Stadium in Cary, NC.

The defending champions were the Louisville Cardinals. Louisville was unable to defend its crown, losing to Virginia Tech in the first round. The Virginia Cavaliers claimed their eleventh title by beating Clemson in the final.

== Qualification ==
All twelve teams in the Atlantic Coast Conference earned a berth into the ACC Tournament. The top 4 seeds received first round byes and hosted the winner of a first round game. All rounds, with the exception of the final were held at the higher seed's home field. Seeding is determined by regular season conference record.

| Seed | School | Conference Record | Points |
|---|---|---|---|
| 1 | Clemson | 6–1–1 | 19 |
| 2 | Virginia | 6–1–1 | 19 |
| 3 | Wake Forest | 6–2–0 | 18 |
| 4 | Pittsburgh | 4–3–1 | 13 |
| 5 | NC State | 3–4–1 | 10 |
| 6 | Louisville | 3–4–1 | 10 |
| 7 | North Carolina | 3–5–0 | 9 |
| 8 | Notre Dame | 3–5–0 | 9 |
| 9 | Boston College | 2–4–2 | 8 |
| 10 | Syracuse | 2–4–2 | 8 |
| 11 | Virginia Tech | 2–4–2 | 8 |
| 12 | Duke | 2–5–1 | 7 |

== Bracket ==
*Note: Home team listed first. Rankings shown are ACC Tournament Seeds.

First Round
#8 Notre Dame | 2^{2OT}
#9 Boston College | 1
#5 NC State | 2
#12 Duke | 1
#6 Louisville | 0
#11 Virginia Tech | 2
#7 North Carolina | 0 (3)
#10 Syracuse | 0 (5)

Quarterfinals
#1 Clemson | 3
#8 Notre Dame | 0
#4 Pittsburgh | 2^{(OT)}
#5 NC State | 1
#3 Wake Forest | 2 (6)
#11 Virginia Tech | 2 (5)
#2 Virginia | 2
#10 Syracuse | 1

Semifinals
#1 Clemson | 1
#4 Pittsburgh | 0
#3 Wake Forest | 0
#2 Virginia | 1

Finals
#1 Clemson | 1
#2 Virginia | 3

== Schedule ==
=== First round ===
| November 5 | #8 Notre Dame | 2–1 (a.e.t.) | #9 Boston College | South Bend, IN |
| 2:00 p.m. EST | Ian Aschieris 61'; Senan Farrelly (yellow card) 70'; BC Own Goal 101' (o.g.) | Report | 23' Stefan Sigurdarson; (yellow card) 37' Lasse Lehmann; (yellow card) 39' Beto Luna; (yellow card) 89' Kristofer Konradsson | Stadium: Alumni Stadium; Attendance: 117; Referee: David Erbacher; Assistant referees: Anthony Vasoli; Carlos Leyva; Fourth official: Frank Pizana |

| November 5 | #7 North Carolina | 0–0 (a.e.t.) (3–5 p) | #10 Syracuse | Chapel Hill, NC |
| 4:00 p.m. EST | Mauricio Pineda (yellow card) 106' | Report | (yellow card) 52' Amferny Sinclair; (yellow card) 88' John-Austin Ricks | Stadium: Fetzer Field; Attendance: 766; Referee: Nikola Aleksic; Assistant referees: Aaron Gallagher; Justin Howard; Fourth official: Daniel Kanakanui |
| | Penalties |
| | Santiago Herrera (penalty missed); Mauricio Pineda (penalty scored); Jack Skahan (penalty scored); Jeremy Kelly (penalty scored) | | Massimo Ferrin (penalty scored); Ryan Raposo (penalty scored); Severin Soerlie (penalty scored); Sondre Norheim (penalty scored); Matt Orr (penalty scored) |

| November 6 | #5 NC State | 2–1 | #12 Duke | Raleigh, NC |
| 2:00 p.m. EST | Pepe Garcia 5', (yellow card) 78'; Ivy Brisma (yellow card) 6'; Kuda Muskwe 22', (yellow card) 41'; George Asomani (yellow card) 67' | Report | 28' Daniele Proch; (yellow card) 69' Hassan Pinto | Stadium: Dial Soccer Stadium; Attendance: 377; Referee: Sergio Gonzalez; Assistant referees: Patrick Schmidt; Kevin Maurer; Fourth official: Daniel Kappler |

| November 6 | #6 Louisville | 0–2 | #11 Virginia Tech | Louisville, KY |
| 4:00 p.m. EST | Cameron Wheeler (yellow card) 27'; William Portman (red card) 86' | Report | 42' Jon Ingason; (yellow card) 42' Sivert Haugli; 44', (yellow card) 76' Daniel Pereira | Stadium: Lynn Stadium; Attendance: 255; Referee: Dimitar Chavdarov; Assistant referees: Jacob Johnson; Chad Collins; Fourth official: Reiss Baxter |

=== Quarterfinals ===
| November 10 | #2 Virginia | 2–1 | #10 Syracuse | Charlottesville, VA |
| 1:00 p.m. EST | Joe Bell 10' (pen.); Nathaniel Crofts 17' | Report | Luther Archimède 69'; Ryan Raposo (yellow card) 74' | Stadium: Klöckner Stadium; Attendance: 1,525; Referee: Jaime Herrera; Assistant referees: Brian Odenwald; Michael Donovan; Fourth official: Kevin Allen |

| November 10 | #4 Pittsburgh | 2–1 (a.e.t.) | #5 NC State | Pittsburgh, PA |
| 3:00 p.m. EST | Edward Kizza 12', 93'; Valentin Noël (yellow card) 43' | Report | 53' George Asomani; (yellow card) 61' Team; (yellow card) 68' Jamie Smith | Stadium: Ambrose Urbanic Field; Attendance: 1,010; Referee: Charles Murphy; Assistant referees: Jason Caruso; Ankur Singh; Fourth official: Carmen Serbio |

| November 10 | #3 Wake Forest | 2–2 (a.e.t.) (6–5 p) | #11 Virginia Tech | Winston-Salem, NC |
| 5:00 p.m. EST | Joey DeZart 59', (yellow card) 106'; Kyle Holcomb 75' | Report | (yellow card) 63' Will Mejia; (yellow card) 73' Nathan Durst; 77' James Kasak; (yellow card) 79' Nick Blacklock; 81' Daniel Pereira; (yellow card) 84' Jacob Labovitz | Stadium: Spry Stadium; Attendance: 2,009; Referee: Mike Stutt; Assistant referees: Kevin Uitto; Rafael Baptista; Fourth official: John Hieb |
| | Penalties |
| | Alistair Johnston (penalty missed); Omar Hernandez (penalty scored); Isaiah Parente (penalty scored); Calvin Harris (penalty scored); Bruno Lapa (penalty scored); Kyle Holcomb (penalty scored); Machop Chol (penalty scored) | | Sivert Haugli (penalty scored); Nick Blacklock (penalty scored); Marc Moppler (penalty scored); Daniel Pereira (penalty scored); Kristo Strickler (penalty missed); Jacob Labovitz (penalty scored); James Kasak (penalty missed) |

| November 10 | #1 Clemson | 3–0 | #8 Notre Dame | Clemson, SC |
| 7:00 p.m. EST | Philip Mayaka 53'; Malick Mbaye 73' (pen.); James Brighton 83'; Nate Hall (yellow card) 87' | Report | (yellow card) 70' Mohamed Omar; (red card) 73' Philip Quinton | Stadium: Riggs Field; Attendance: 1,703; Referee: Matthew Kreitzer; Assistant referees: Tarik Veledar; Kevin Huet; Fourth official: Brian Todd |

=== Semifinals ===
| November 13 | #2 Virginia | 1–0 | #3 Wake Forest | Charlottesville, VA |
| 4:00 p.m. EST | Nathaniel Crofts 24'; Henry Kessler (yellow card) 67'; Andreas Ueland (yellow card) 81' | Report | (yellow card) 22' Calvin Harris; (yellow card) 79' Kyle Holcomb | Stadium: Klöckner Stadium; Attendance: 586; Referee: David Erbacher; Assistant referees: Mark Remsa; Rick Rogers; Fourth official: Neil Morrissette |

| November 13 | #1 Clemson | 1–0 | #4 Pittsburgh | Clemson, SC |
| 6:00 p.m. EST | Mohamed Seye 43'; Philip Mayaka (yellow card) 67'; Charlie Asensio (yellow card) 81' | Report | (yellow card) 59' Lucas Cyriacus; (yellow card) 81' Alexander Dexter | Stadium: Riggs Field; Attendance: 1,573; Referee: Nikola Aleksic; Assistant referees: Larry Pachon; A. Zhelyazkov; Fourth official: Richonne Clark |

=== Finals ===
| November 17 | #1 Clemson | 1–3 | #2 Virginia | Cary, NC |
| 12:00 p.m. EST | James Brighton 18'; Malick Mbaye (yellow card) 75' (red card) 82'; Philip Mayaka (yellow card) 77'; Tanner Dieterich (yellow card) 87' | Report | 64' Axel Gunnarsson; (yellow card) 78' Daniel Steedman; 81' Cabrel Happi Kamseu; 82' (pen.) Robin Afamefuna | Stadium: Sahlen's Stadium; Attendance: 1,330; Referee: Sergio Gonzalez; Assistant referees: Tarik Veledar; Chris Zuerner; Fourth official: Justin Frear |

== Statistics ==
=== Goalscorers ===
2 Goals

- (United States) James Brighton – Clemson
- (England) Nathaniel Crofts – Virginia
- (Uganda) Edward Kizza – Pittsburgh
- (Venezuela) Daniel Pereira – Virginia Tech

1 Goal

- (Germany) Robin Afamefuna – Virginia
- (United States) Luther Archimède – Syracuse
- (United States) Ian Aschieris – Notre Dame
- (Ghana) George Asomani – NC State
- (New Zealand) Joe Bell – Virginia
- (United States) Joey DeZart – Wake Forest
- (Spain) Pepe Garcia – NC State
- (Sweden) Axel Gunnarsson – Virginia
- (Zimbabwe) Cabrel Happi Kamseu – Virginia
- (United States) Kyle Holcomb – Wake Forest
- (Iceland) Jon Ingason – Virginia Tech
- (United States) James Kasak – Virginia Tech
- (Kenya) Philip Mayaka – Clemson
- (Ghana) Malick Mbaye – Clemson
- (England) Kuda Muskwe – NC State
- (Italy) Daniele Proch – Duke
- (Spain) Mohamed Seye – Clemson
- (Iceland) Stefan Sigurdarson – Boston College

Own Goals

- Boston College (team) against Notre Dame

== All-Tournament team ==
| Player | Team |
|---|---|
**ACC Men’s Soccer All-Tournament team**
| Nathaniel Crofts | Virginia |
| Bret Halsey | Virginia |
| Cabrel Happi Kamseu | Virginia |
| **Henry Kessler** | Virginia |
| James Brighton | Clemson |
| Tanner Dieterich | Clemson |
| Philip Mayaka | Clemson |
| Edward Kizza | Pittsburgh |
| Arturo Ordoñez | Pittsburgh |
| Michael DeShields | Wake Forest |
| Joey DeZart | Wake Forest |

MVP in Bold

== See also ==
- Atlantic Coast Conference
- 2019 Atlantic Coast Conference men's soccer season
- 2019 NCAA Division I men's soccer season
- 2019 NCAA Division I men's soccer tournament
