= Wagneau Eloi =

Haitian footballer (born 1973)

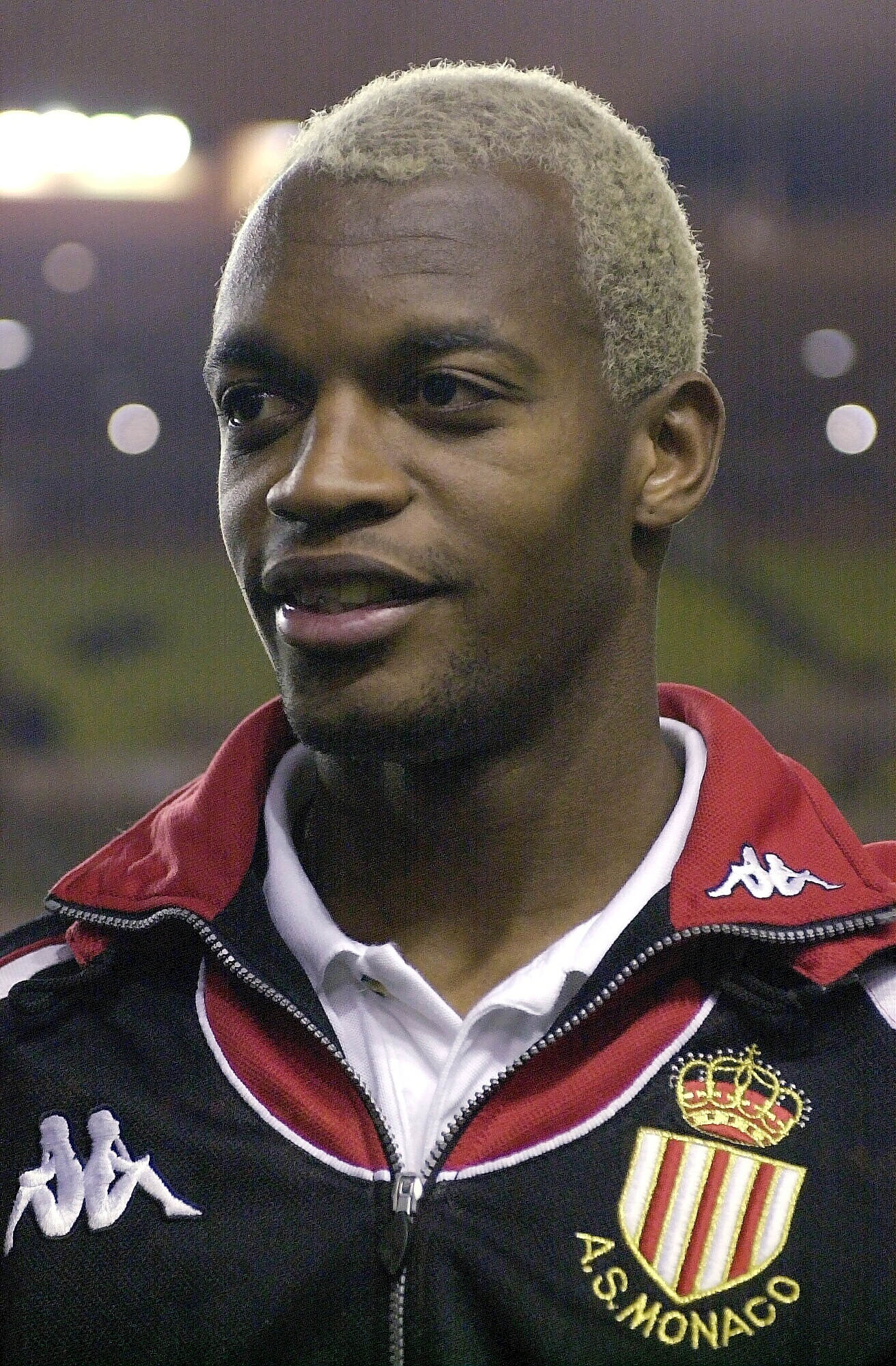
- Eloi in 2000

Personal information
- Date of birth: 11 September 1973 (age 53)
- Place of birth: Port-au-Prince, Haiti
- Height: 1.86 m (6 ft 1 in)
- Position: Striker

Youth career
- Red Star
- Paris FC

Senior career*
Years	Team	Apps	(Gls)
1993–1995	Lens	19	(2)
1995–1997	Nancy	41	(7)
1997–1999	Lens	37	(10)
1999–2002	Monaco	32	(4)
2002–2003	Guingamp	18	(5)
2004	Lens	4	(1)
2004–2005	La Louvière	16	(7)
2005–2007	Roeselaere	36	(15)
Total		203	(51)

Managerial career
- 2008–2009: Haiti
- 2014–: FC Miami City
- * Club domestic league appearances and goals

Wagneau Eloi (born 11 September 1973) is a Haitian former professional footballer who played as a striker.

Born in Haiti, Eloi's family relocated to Paris, France, when he was nine. In Paris, Eloi played for Red Star and Paris FC before joining RC Lens, where he made his senior debut. Having spent two seasons at AS Nancy, he returned to Lens in 1997 helping the club win its first Ligue 1 title. In three years at AS Monaco, he won another league title. He played the 2002–03 season at EA Guingamp and signed for Lens a third time in 2004. He retired from playing after two stints in Belgium with La Louvière and Roeselaere.

In 2008, Eloi became head coach of the Haiti national team.

In 2014, Eloi co-founded the US Champions Soccer Academy and became its technical director. He also became head coach of FC Miami City Champions in the Premier Development League expansion franchise in the Miami, Florida metro.

== Playing career ==
Eloi was born in Port-au-Prince, Haiti. His father was a carpenter, and his mother a seamstress. He moved to France with his mother, his brother, and his sister when he was nine years old. He spent four years at Paris-based club Red Star.

Eloi continued his training at Paris FC. He stayed two years at the club, being fielded as a goalkeeper in his first season, before joining RC Lens in 1991. At Lens, teammate Roger Boli became his mentor and friend. After four years at Lens he joined AS Nancy.

Under Roger Lemerre, he won his first professional championship title at the Military World Championships with the French team Joinville Battalion.

He returned to RC Lens where he helped the club win its first Ligue 1 title during the 1997–98 season.

In 1999, Eloi moved to AS Monaco FC, after Thierry Henry had left.

He joined the En Avant de Guingamp in 2002.

He trialled with US Créteil in January 2004 but ultimately rejoined RC Lens for a third time.

In 2008, his professional career came to an end in Belgium where he had played for both Roeselaere and La Louvière.

== Post-playing career ==
Upon his retirement, Eloi returned to his native country, Haiti, in 2008. On 8 April 2008, he was unveiled as the new head coach of the Haiti national team in order to prepare it for the upcoming 2010 World Cup. In his first match, a 0–0 draw against the Netherlands Antilles, he fielded a young team with an average age of less than 24 years.

In 2014 Eloi co-founded the US Champions Soccer Academy with Ravy Truchot and Éric Rabésandratana and became its technical director. He was also made the head coach of FC Miami City Champions, a new Premier Development League expansion franchise in the Miami, Florida metro.

== Personal life ==
Eloi married a woman from Senegal. During his time at Guingamp, it was reported he enjoyed reading comics and manga.

== Honours ==
Lens

- Ligue 1: 1997–98

Monaco

- Ligue 1: 1999–2000
- Trophée des Champions: 2000
