= 2019 Clemson Tigers men's soccer team =

American college soccer season

2019 Clemson Tigers men's soccer

ACC Atlantic Division regular season champions

NCAA Tournament, Quarterfinals
- Conference: Atlantic Coast Conference
- U. Soc. Coaches poll: No. 5
- TopDrawerSoccer.com: No. 8
- Record: 18–2–2 (6–1–1 ACC)
- Head coach: Mike Noonan (10th season)
- Assistant coaches: Philip Jones (7th season); Camilo Rodriguez (4th season)
- Home stadium: Riggs Field

2019 ACC men's soccer standings
	Conf.					Overall
Team	W		L		T	W		L		T
Atlantic
No. 5 Clemson +	6	–	1	–	1	18	–	2	–	2
No. 3 Wake Forest +	6	–	2	–	0	16	–	5	–	2
NC State +	3	–	4	–	1	9	–	7	–	3
No. 20 Louisville +	3	–	4	–	1	10	–	8	–	2
Boston College +	2	–	4	–	2	9	–	6	–	3
Syracuse +	2	–	4	–	2	8	–	7	–	4
Coastal
No. 2 Virginia ‡	6	–	1	–	1	21	–	1	–	2
Pittsburgh +	4	–	3	–	1	10	–	8	–	2
Notre Dame +	3	–	5	–	0	10	–	8	–	1
North Carolina	3	–	5	–	0	7	–	8	–	3
No. 13 Virginia Tech +	2	–	4	–	2	10	–	6	–	3
Duke	2	–	5	–	1	7	–	9	–	2
‡ – 2019 ACC Tournament champion + – Invited to the 2019 NCAA tournament; As of 17 December 2019; Rankings from United Soccer Coaches; Source:The ACC

The 2019 Clemson Tigers men's soccer team represented Clemson University during the 2019 NCAA Division I men's soccer season. The Tigers were led by head coach Mike Noonan, in his tenth season. They played home games at Riggs Field. This was the team's 59th season playing organized men's college soccer and their 32nd playing in the Atlantic Coast Conference.

== Background ==
The 2018 Clemson men's soccer team finished the season with a 7–9–1 overall record and a 2–6–0 ACC record. The Tigers were seeded twelfth–overall in the 2018 ACC Men's Soccer Tournament, where they lost in the first round to Notre Dame. The Tigers were not invited to the 2018 NCAA Division I Men's Soccer Tournament. This was the first time in five years the Tigers did not qualify for the tournament. Their seven wins was the Tigers' lowest win total since 2012.

At the end of the season, one Tigers men's soccer player was selected in the 2019 MLS SuperDraft: Patrick Bunk-Andersen.

== Player movement ==
=== Players leaving ===
Name	Number	Pos.	Height	Weight	Year	Hometown	Reason for departure
Jonny Sutherland	1	GK	6'0"	170	Graduate	Chester, England	Graduated
Patrick Bunk-Andersen	3	DF	6'2"	175	Senior	Copenhagen, Denmark	Declared for 2019 MLS SuperDraft; selected 54th overall by Toronto FC
Johnny Heckman	8	MF	5'7"	150	Senior	Franklin, TN	Graduated

=== Players arriving ===
Name	Nat.	Hometown	Club	TDS Rating
Matthew Boberg; FW	USA	Brownsburg, IN	Indiana Fire Academy	2/5 stars
Judson Burns; DF	USA	Argyle, TX	FC Dallas	3/5 stars
Enrique Montana III; DF	USA	Duvall, WA	Seattle Sounders FC	3/5 stars
Isaiah Reid; DF	USA	Rock Hill, SC	Charlotte Soccer Academy	3/5 stars
Dylan Sullivan; FW	USA	Harrison, NJ	New York Red Bulls	3/5 stars

== Squad ==
=== Roster ===
Updated December 9, 2019

Note: Flags indicate national team as defined under FIFA eligibility rules; some limited exceptions apply. Players may hold more than one non-FIFA nationality.

No.	Pos.	Nation	Player
1	GK	USA	Daniel Kuzemka
2	DF	USA	Judson Burns
3	DF	SWE	Oskar Ågren
4	DF	SEN	Justin Malou
5	MF	SEN	Malick Mbaye
6	DF	USA	Tanner Dieterich
7	MF	USA	Robbie Robinson
8	MF	ECU	Luis Felipe Fernandez-Salvador
9	FW	ENG	Kimarni Smith
10	FW	CRC	Adrian Nunez
11	FW	USA	Grayson Barber
12	FW	USA	Adam Yorke
13	MF	USA	John Martin
14	MF	ESP	Mohamed Seye
15	DF	USA	Charlie Asensio
16	MF	USA	Cale Thorne

No.	Pos.	Nation	Player
17	MF	USA	Quinn McNeill
18	MF	ESP	Alvaro Gomez
19	FW	USA	Matt Boberg
20	MF	KEN	Philip Mayaka
21	MF	USA	Izzy Garcia-Perez
22	GK	USA	Nolan Lennon
23	MF	ISL	Sindri Björnsson
24	DF	USA	Stirling Russell
25	FW	USA	James Brighton
26	MF	USA	Jake Barron
27	DF	USA	Isaiah Reid
28	FW	USA	Nate Hall
29	DF	USA	Enrique Montana III
30	MF	USA	Dylan Sullivan
31	GK	USA	George Marks
—	FW	USA	Chris Matlashewki

=== Team management ===
Position	Staff
Athletic Director	(United States) Dan Radakovich
Head coach	(United States) Mike Noonan
Associate head coach	(England) Philip Jones
Assistant Coach	(Colombia) Camilo Rodriguez
Director of Operations	(United States) Rob Thompson

== Schedule ==
Date Time, TV	Rank^{#}	Opponent^{#}	Result	Record	Site (Attendance) City, State
Exhibition
August 20*; 6:00 p.m.		at Coastal Carolina	W 3–1	– (–)	Coastal Carolina University Soccer Field; Conway, SC
August 24*; 7:00 p.m.		Presbyterian	W 3–0	– (–)	Riggs Field; Clemson, SC
Regular season
August 30*; 7:00 p.m.		South Carolina; Rivalry	W 4–1	1–0–0 (0–0–0)	Riggs Field (3,382); Clemson, SC
September 2*; 5:00 p.m.		Detroit Mercy	W 8–0	2–0–0 (0–0–0)	Riggs Field (1,267); Clemson, SC
September 6*; 7:30 p.m.	No. 19	UNCG	W 2–1	3–0–0 (0–0–0)	Riggs Field (2,718); Clemson, SC
September 9*; 7:00 p.m.	No. 19	USC Upstate	W 7–0	4–0–0 (0–0–0)	Riggs Field (1,101); Clemson, SC
September 13; 7:00 p.m.	No. 13	at No. 10 Notre Dame	W 4–2	5–0–0 (1–0–0)	Alumni Stadium (1,078); Notre Dame, IN
September 17*; 7:00 p.m.	No. 7	Fordham	W 3–2 ^{OT}	6–0–0 (1–0–0)	Riggs Field (1,435); Clemson, SC
September 20; 8:00 p.m.	No. 7	No. 15 Duke	W 3–1	7–0–0 (2–0–0)	Riggs Field (2,452); Clemson, SC
September 24*; 7:00 p.m.	No. 4	at Furman	W 2–0	8–0–0 (2–0–0)	Stone Stadium (2,712); Greenville, SC
September 28; 7:00 p.m.	No. 4	at No. 7 Wake Forest	L 2–3 ^{OT}	8–1–0 (2–1–0)	Spry Stadium (4,126); Winston-Salem, NC
October 1*; 7:00 p.m.	No. 6	at College of Charleston	W 3–0	9–1–0 (2–1–0)	CofC Soccer Stadium (1,544); Charleston, SC
October 5; 7:00 p.m.	No. 6	No. 22 Virginia Tech	T 0–0 ^{2OT}	9–1–1 (2–1–1)	Riggs Field (1,639); Clemson, SC
October 11; 7:00 p.m.	No. 11	Louisville	W 4–0	10–1–1 (3–1–1)	Riggs Field (1,700); Clemson, SC
October 19; 7:00 p.m.	No. 8	at Syracuse	W 7–4	11–1–1 (4–1–1)	SU Soccer Stadium (1,342); Syracuse, NY
October 22*; 7:00 p.m.	No. 3	Radford	W 5–0	12–1–1 (4–1–1)	Riggs Field (1,091); Clemson, SC
October 25; 7:00 p.m.	No. 3	Boston College; Rivalry	W 3–1	13–1–1 (5–1–1)	Riggs Field (2,023); Clemson, SC
November 1; 7:00 p.m.	No. 2	at NC State	W 3–0	14–1–1 (6–1–1)	Dail Soccer Stadium (1,171); Raleigh, NC
ACC Tournament
November 10; 7:00 p.m.	(1) No. 2	(9) Notre Dame; Quarterfinals	W 3–0	15–1–1	Riggs Field (1,703); Clemson, SC
November 13; 6:00 p.m.	(1) No. 1	(4) No. 25 Pittsburgh; Semifinals	W 1–0	16–1–1	Riggs Field (1,573); Clemson, SC
November 17; 12:00 p.m.	(1) No. 1	(2) No. 2 Virginia; Final	L 1–3	16–2–1	Sahlen's Stadium (1,330); Cary, NC
NCAA Tournament
November 24; 6:00 p.m.	(2) No. 3	No. 15 Charlotte; Second Round	W 2–1 ^{OT}	17–2–1	Riggs Field (1,472); Clemson, SC
December 1; 6:00 p.m.	(2) No. 3	No. 21 Providence; Third Round	W 2–1 ^{2OT}	18–2–1	Riggs Field (1,469); Clemson, SC
December 6; 6:00 p.m.	(2) No. 3	(7) No. 7 Stanford; Quarterfinals	T 1–1 (4–5 PKs) ^{2OT}	18–2–2	Riggs Field (3,267); Clemson, SC
*Non-conference game. ^{#}Rankings from United Soccer Coaches. (#) Tournament seedings in parentheses.

== Goals Record ==
Rank	No.	Nat.	Po.	Name	Regular season	ACC Tournament	NCAA Tournament	Total
1	7	(United States)	MF	Robbie Robinson	15	0	3	18
2	9	(England)	FW	Kimarni Smith	13	0	0	13
3	11	(United States)	FW	Grayson Barber	9	0	1	10
4	24	(United States)	FW	James Brighton	4	2	0	6
5	14	(Spain)	FW	Mohamed Seye	3	1	1	5
6	5	(Senegal)	DF	Malick Mbaye	2	1	0	3
6	6	(United States)	DF	Tanner Dieterich	3	0	0	3
6	10	(Costa Rica)	FW	Adrian Nunez	3	0	0	3
9	18	(Spain)	MF	Alvaro Gomez	2	0	0	2
9	20	(Kenya)	MF	Philip Mayaka	1	1	0	2
11	3	(Sweden)	DF	Oskar Ågren	1	0	0	1
11	8	(Ecuador)	MF	Luis Felipe Fernandez-Salvador	1	0	0	1
11	17	(United States)	MF	Quinn McNeill	1	0	0	1
11	28	(United States)	FW	Nate Hall	1	0	0	1
Total					59	5	5	69

== Disciplinary record ==
Rank	No.	Nat.	Po.	Name	Regular Season			ACC Tournament			NCAA Tournament			Total		
Rank	No.	Nat.	Po.	Name	Booked	(yellow card) (yellow-red card)	Sent off (straight red)	Booked	(yellow card) (yellow-red card)	Sent off (straight red)	Booked	(yellow card) (yellow-red card)	Sent off (straight red)	Booked	(yellow card) (yellow-red card)	Sent off (straight red)
1	20	(Kenya)	MF	Philip Mayaka	4	0	0	2	0	0	2	0	0	8	0	0
2	5	(Senegal)	DF	Malick Mbaye	3	0	0	1	0	1	0	0	0	4	0	1
3	6	(United States)	DF	Tanner Dieterich	2	0	0	1	0	0	0	1	0	3	1	0
4	11	(United States)	FW	Grayson Barber	4	0	0	0	0	0	0	0	0	4	0	0
5	3	(Sweden)	DF	Oskar Ågren	2	0	0	0	0	0	1	0	0	3	0	0
5	15	(United States)	DF	Charlie Asensio	1	0	0	1	0	0	1	0	0	3	0	0
7	4	(Senegal)	DF	Justin Malou	2	0	0	0	0	0	0	0	0	2	0	0
7	7	(United States)	FW	Robbie Robinson	2	0	0	0	0	0	0	0	0	2	0	0
7	9	(England)	FW	Kimarni Smith	2	0	0	0	0	0	0	0	0	2	0	0
7	17	(United States)	MF	Quinn McNeill	2	0	0	0	0	0	0	0	0	2	0	0
11	10	(Costa Rica)	FW	Adrian Nunez	1	0	0	0	0	0	0	0	0	1	0	0
11	23	(Iceland)	MF	Sindri Björnsson	1	0	0	0	0	0	0	0	0	1	0	0
11	25	(United States)	FW	James Brighton	1	0	0	0	0	0	0	0	0	1	0	0
11	28	(United States)	FW	Nate Hall	0	0	0	1	0	0	0	0	0	1	0	0
11	30	(United States)	GK	George Marks	1	0	0	0	0	0	0	0	0	1	0	0
Total					28	0	0	6	0	1	3	1	0	37	1	1

== Awards and honors ==
Recipient	Award	Date	Ref.
Kimarni Smith	ACC Offensive Player of the Week	September 16, 2019	
Robbie Robinson	ACC Offensive Player of the Week	October 21, 2019	
Robbie Robinson	ACC Offensive Player of the Week	October 28, 2019	
Mike Noonan	ACC Coach of the Year	November 13, 2019	
Robbie Robinson	ACC Offensive Player of the Year	November 13, 2019	
Malick Mbaye	ACC Defensive Player of the Year	November 13, 2019	
Philip Mayaka	ACC Freshman of the Year	November 13, 2019	
Robbie Robinson	All-ACC First Team	November 13, 2019	
Malick Mbaye	All-ACC First Team	November 13, 2019	
Philip Mayaka	All-ACC First Team	November 13, 2019	
Kimarni Smith	All-ACC First Team	November 13, 2019	
Grayson Barber	All-ACC Second Team	November 13, 2019	
Tanner Dieterich	All-ACC Second Team	November 13, 2019	
George Marks	All-ACC Second Team	November 13, 2019	
Oskar Ågren	All-ACC Freshman Team	November 13, 2019	
Philip Mayaka	All-ACC Freshman Team	November 13, 2019	
James Brighton	All-ACC Tournament Team	November 17, 2019	
Tanner Dieterich	All-ACC Tournament Team	November 17, 2019	
Philip Mayaka	All-ACC Tournament Team	November 17, 2019	
Robbie Robinson	Hermann Trophy	January 3, 2020	
Robbie Robinson	ACC Athlete of the Year	May 20, 2020	

== 2020 MLS Super Draft ==
Player	Team	Round	Pick #	Position
Robbie Robinson	Inter Miami CF	1	1	FW
Tanner Dieterich	Nashville SC	2	28	MF
Malick Mbaye	Toronto FC	2	33	DF

== Rankings ==
Ranking movement Legend: ██ Improvement in ranking. ██ Decrease in ranking. ██ Not ranked the previous week. RV=Others receiving votes.
Poll	Pre	Wk 1	Wk 2	Wk 3	Wk 4	Wk 5	Wk 6	Wk 7	Wk 8	Wk 9	Wk 10	Wk 11	Wk 12	Wk 13	Wk 14	Wk 15	Wk 16	Final
United Soccer	RV	19	13	7	4	6	11	8	3	2 (4)	2 (1)	1 (19)	3	None Released				5
TopDrawer Soccer				12	8	7	6	11	6	5	5	5	6	4	4	6	8	8
