= Peachtree City MOBA =

- Full name: MOBA Soccer Academy
- Short name: PTC MOBA
- Founded: 2013; 13 years ago
- Dissolved: 21 May 2025; 16 months ago
- Stadium: MOBA Soccer Stadium
- Capacity: 1,265
- Owner: Volker Harms
- League: USL League Two
- 2021: 5th, Deep South Division; Playoffs: DNQ
- Website: www.mobasoccer.com
Home colors	Away colors

Peachtree City MOBA was an American soccer team based in Peachtree City, Georgia. Founded as a soccer academy in 2013, the team played in USL League Two, the fourth tier of the United States soccer league system.

== History ==
The MOBA Soccer Academy, owned by Volker Harms, was awarded a franchise in the Premier Development League on 15 January 2016. The team's academy complex features an indoor training facility, with locker rooms, classrooms, meeting rooms, and a weight-training room. The complex also has two FIFA regulation fields, with seating for up to 1,000 fans.

On 20 January 2016, it was announced that former Atlanta Silverbacks player Jordan Davis would be named head coach of Peachtree City MOBA. The team's inaugural match took place on 14 May 2016, a 2–1 loss to Mississippi Brilla. The first ever goal in club history was scored by Alex Rotoloni. MOBA earned their first win in the second game of the year against Tri-Cities Otters FC, with a final score of 2–1. Both goals were scored by Omar Jarun.

MOBA got its first ever home win on 22 June 2016 in a 2–1 dramatic victory also against Tri-Cities with an 86th-minute goal by Omar Jarun and a late stoppage time goal by Jessey Hein. Peachtree City finished their inaugural season with 3 wins, 9 losses, and 2 draws, 6th in the South Atlantic Division. At the 2016 PDL Winter Summit, Peachtree City MOBA received the 2016 PDL Golden Scarf in the category of Best Static Ad.

Following the 2016 season, head coach Jordan Davis departed the team and owner Volker Harms took over head coaching duties. The 2017 season marked the first season that Peachtree City MOBA called MOBA Soccer Stadium their official home, as the stadium was completed in March 2017. The 2017 PDL season went very poorly for Peachtree City. Beginning the year with a 6–1 defeat at the hands of Nashville SC U23, MOBA started 0–6–1, including a five-match losing streak. MOBA did not get their first win until 21 June, when Michael Brezovsky scored the winner in the 84th minute on the road against Nashville. That kicked off a string of success for MOBA where they went 1–1–1 in their next three, but MOBA would fall in their final three matches to close the year, twice to South Georgia Tormenta FC 6–3 and 2–0, respectively, and once to SC United Bantams 4–0 in the season finale, finishing 2–10–2 and 11th on the South Atlantic Division table.

Prior to tryouts for the 2018 season, on 21 November 2017, MOBA announced a full restructuring of the coaching staff: Omar Jarun had been promoted to manager, former Jamaican International and Puerto Rico Islanders forward Nicholas Addlery had been hired as an assistant, and former Atlanta Silverbacks goalkeeper Felipe Quintero had been hired as the goalkeepers coach. The league also announced in early 2018 that Peachtree City, along with select other South Atlantic Division clubs, would become founding members of the new Deep South Division in the Southern Conference.

== Stadium ==
=== Starr's Mill Stadium ===
Peachtree City MOBA's original plan was to begin play at the MOBA Soccer Academy's MOBA Soccer Stadium, the 1,000 seat stadium on Highway 74. However, it was announced on 11 March 2016 on the club's Facebook page that, due to a rain delay, the stadium would not be finished in time, and 2016 games would have to be moved to the football stadium at Starr's Mill High School until further notice.

=== MOBA Soccer Stadium ===
Peachtree City MOBA announced in March 2017 that construction on the new MOBA Soccer Stadium had been completed. The 1,000 seat stadium features a FIFA regulation artificial turf field with fan seating running down the north-west sideline and a large scoreboard on the south-east sideline. The team played their first regular season match at the new stadium on 20 May 2017, a 2–0 loss to Mississippi Brilla FC.

== Rivalries ==
=== Tormenta FC ===
The 2016 PDL Season marked the inaugural season for both Peachtree City MOBA and Tormenta FC, the PDL team based out of Statesboro. The Premier Development League's Director of Operations, Todd Eason, stated "[W]e believe the league's second new addition in Georgia this offseason will quickly create a rivalry between Peachtree City MOBA and Tormenta FC." The hope for a rivalry, dubbed the Georgia PDL Clasico by MOBA live-stream commentator Sam Ellis, seemed to be coming to fruition when the two teams faced off for the first time on 3 June 2016. 21 fouls were committed, including 5 yellow cards, in a match that MOBA ultimately won 1–0 off of an Iain Smith goal in the 67th minute. Later that season, the two met again in Peachtree City in a match that ended in a 3–3 tie, including two goals by MOBA's Todd Fidler in his first ever start. Tormenta got their first win in the series on 3 July 2017, as Jad Arslan recorded a hat-trick to propel Tormenta to a 6–3 victory on the road.

Tormenta FC leads the all-time series 1–3–3.

== Staff ==
(Germany) Volker Harms, Owner
(Germany) Jutta Harms, Director of Public Relations
(United States) Kathy Phalen, Community Outreach & Sponsorship
(United States) Jim Robbins, Director of Coaching, USL2 Head Coach

== Seasons ==
Season	League	Conference	Division	Regular Season									Playoffs	U.S. Open Cup	Manager
Season	League	Conference	Division	Finish	GP	W	L	D	PTS	GF	GA	GD	Playoffs	U.S. Open Cup	Manager
2016	PDL	Eastern	South Atlantic	6th	14	3	9	2	11	15	29	–14	DNQ	DNQ	Jordan Davis
2017	PDL	Eastern	South Atlantic	11th	14	2	10	2	8	15	34	–19	DNQ	DNQ	Volker Harms/Omar Jarun
2018	PDL	Southern	Deep South	6th	14	4	6	4	16	25	33	–8	DNQ	DNQ	Omar Jarun
2019	USL League Two	Southern	Deep South	6th	14	2	11	1	7	11	27	–16	DNQ	DNQ	Jim Robbins
2020	USL League Two	Southern	Deep South	Season canceled due to COVID-19 pandemic											
2021	USL League Two	Southern	Deep South	5th	14	5	7	2	17	22	25	–3	DNQ	DNQ	Jim Robbins
Total	–	–	–	–	70	16	43	11	–	88	148	–60	–	–	

== Awards ==
=== Individual awards ===
USL League Two Goal of the Year

- Damien Robbins – 2019

=== Team awards ===
Premier Development League Golden Scarf

- Best Static Ad – 2016
