= Omar Jarun =

Palestinian footballer

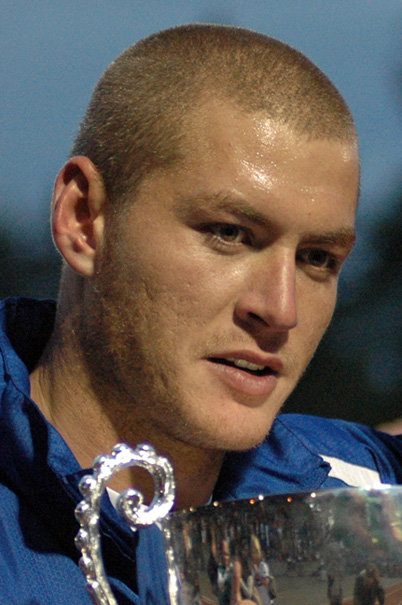

Personal information
- Date of birth: December 10, 1983 (age 42)
- Place of birth: Kuwait City, Kuwait
- Height: 1.96 m (6 ft 5 in)
- Position: Centre-back

Team information
- Current team: Austin FC II (assistant)

College career
Years	Team	Apps	(Gls)
2002–2003	Memphis Tigers	35	(8)
2004–2005	Dayton Flyers	39	(19)

Senior career*
Years	Team	Apps	(Gls)
2004	Fort Wayne Fever	6	(1)
2005	Chicago Fire Premier	2	(0)
2006–2007	Atlanta Silverbacks	45	(1)
2008	Vancouver Whitecaps	24	(1)
2009–2010	Flota Świnoujście	32	(1)
2010	Pogoń Szczecin	12	(0)
2011	FC Tampa Bay	7	(0)
2011–2012	Arka Gdynia	20	(1)
2012–2013	Charleroi	2	(0)
2014	Ottawa Fury	16	(2)
2015	Bharat FC	13	(3)
2016–2017	Peachtree City MOBA	9	(3)
Total		188	(13)

International career
2007–2014	Palestine	15	(0)

Managerial career
- 2017: Peachtree City MOBA (assistant)
- 2018: Peachtree City MOBA
- 2018–2022: Atlanta United (academy)
- 2023–2025: Huntsville City (assistant)
- 2025–: Austin FC II (assistant)
- * Club domestic league appearances and goals

Omar Jarun (Arabic: عمر جعرون; born December 10, 1983) is a former footballer who is the assistant coach of Austin FC II in MLS Next Pro. Born in Kuwait, he represented Palestine internationally.

Jarun has played professionally in the United States, Canada, Poland, Belgium, and India.

== Early and personal life ==
Jarun was born in Kuwait City, Kuwait to an American mother and a Palestinian father from Tulkarem. Jarun emigrated to the United States during the First Gulf War in 1990; his family escaped after bombs went off and missiles were shot near their apartment. He was raised in Peachtree City, Georgia.

== Playing career ==
=== Club career ===
Jarun played college soccer for the University of Memphis and the University of Dayton, and has played club football for Fort Wayne Fever, Chicago Fire Premier, Atlanta Silverbacks, Vancouver Whitecaps, Flota Świnoujście, Pogoń Szczecin, FC Tampa Bay, Arka Gdynia and Charleroi.

He was released by Pogon on March 1, 2011.

Jarun signed with FC Tampa Bay of the North American Soccer League on March 29, 2011.

Jarun after brief spell with FC Tampa Bay he signed a contract with Arka Gdynia, under Petr Nemec, who was the manager that brought Jarun to Poland when he was the Flota Świnoujście manager.

On January 7, 2014, Jarun signed for NASL club Ottawa Fury FC.

Jarun signed for I-League club Bharat FC on March 20, 2015, for an 18-month deal completing the club's Asian player quota.

In June 2015 he announced his retirement from professional football. However, on April 16, 2016, it was announced that Jarun joined Premier Development League club Peachtree City MOBA.

=== International career ===
Jarun made his international debut for the Palestinian national team in 2007, and has appeared in FIFA World Cup qualifying matches, AFC Challenge Cup, WAFF Championship.

== Coaching career ==
Following one season as a player for Peachtree City, Jarun became an assistant for the club prior to the 2017 PDL season, as owner Volker Harms took over manager duties. 2017 was a dismal season for MOBA, as they went 2-10-2 and finished last place in the division, failing to qualify for the playoffs for the second straight year. Jarun was named manager of the club for the 2018 season in November 2017, with former Jamaican international Nicholas Addlery being hired as an assistant. Alongside his duties as manager, Jarun was also a member of the MOBA youth coaching staff.

In October 2018 he became manager of the Atlanta United FC Academy.

In June 2021 he became assistant coach of Atlanta United 2 in the USL Championship.

On January 18, 2023, Jarun was named to the first-ever technical staff for MLS Next Pro club Huntsville City, the reserve side for Nashville SC.

On September 23, 2025, Jarun was named assistant coach for Austin FC II, the MLS Next Pro reserve team for Austin FC.
