= Ravy =

Ravy is a male given name. Notable people with this name include:

- Ol Ravy (born 1993), Cambodian football player
- Ravy Truchot (born 1972), French entrepreneur
- Ravy Tsouka (born 1994), Congolese football player

== See also ==
- Ravi (name)
