= Martim Galvão =

Portuguese footballer

Personal information
- Full name: Martim Galvão
- Date of birth: July 17, 1995 (age 31)
- Place of birth: Lisbon, Portugal
- Height: 5 ft 10 in (1.78 m)
- Position: Midfielder

College career
Years	Team	Apps	(Gls)
2014–2016	Pfeiffer Falcons	67	(22)

Senior career*
Years	Team	Apps	(Gls)
2016	Ocean City Nor'easters	12	(3)
2017	Nashville SC U23	13	(7)
2018	Nashville SC	0	(0)
2018–2019	Enosis Neon THOI Lakatamia	9	(0)
2019	Sparta	4	(2)
- * Club domestic league appearances and goals

Martim Galvão (born July 7, 1995) is a Portuguese soccer player.

== Career ==
=== College and amateur ===
Galvão was born in Lisbon, Portugal. He played his college career at Pfeiffer Falcons, where he played mainly as a playmaking midfielder. Galvão scored 22 goals and had 45 assists in 67 matches for the Falcons. His best match came in a 5-0 victory over North Greenville on October 11, 2014, when he scored a hattrick and provided 2 assists.

Galvão played in 13 of 14 matches with Nashville SC's U-23 side in PDL during the summer of 2017, scoring 7 goals and providing 4 assists.

=== Professional ===
On January 23, 2018, Nashville SC announced Galvão as the club's 21st signing. He made no competitive appearances for Nashville before being released on August 31, 2018. On September 17, 2018, Galvão signed a one-season contract with Thoi Lakatamias FC in the Cypriot Second Division.
