= 2019 Virginia Cavaliers men's soccer team =

American college soccer season

2019 Virginia Cavaliers men's soccer

ACC Coastal Division regular season champions ACC Tournament champions

NCAA Tournament, Runner-Up
- Conference: Atlantic Coast Conference
- Coastal
- U. Soc. Coaches poll: No. 2
- TopDrawerSoccer.com: No. 2
- Record: 21–1–2 (6–1–1 ACC)
- Head coach: George Gelnovatch (24th season)
- Assistant coaches: Matt Chulis (13th season); Ryan Hopkins (2nd season)
- Home stadium: Klöckner Stadium

Uniform
| Home | Away |

2019 ACC men's soccer standings
| | Conf. | | | | | Overall |
| Team | W | | L | | T | W | | L | | T |
|---|---|---|---|---|---|---|---|---|---|---|
Atlantic
| No. 5 Clemson + | 6 | – | 1 | – | 1 | 18 | – | 2 | – | 2 |
| No. 3 Wake Forest + | 6 | – | 2 | – | 0 | 16 | – | 5 | – | 2 |
| NC State + | 3 | – | 4 | – | 1 | 9 | – | 7 | – | 3 |
| No. 20 Louisville + | 3 | – | 4 | – | 1 | 10 | – | 8 | – | 2 |
| Boston College + | 2 | – | 4 | – | 2 | 9 | – | 6 | – | 3 |
| Syracuse + | 2 | – | 4 | – | 2 | 8 | – | 7 | – | 4 |
Coastal
| No. 2 Virginia ‡ | 6 | – | 1 | – | 1 | 21 | – | 1 | – | 2 |
| Pittsburgh + | 4 | – | 3 | – | 1 | 10 | – | 8 | – | 2 |
| Notre Dame + | 3 | – | 5 | – | 0 | 10 | – | 8 | – | 1 |
| North Carolina | 3 | – | 5 | – | 0 | 7 | – | 8 | – | 3 |
| No. 13 Virginia Tech + | 2 | – | 4 | – | 2 | 10 | – | 6 | – | 3 |
| Duke | 2 | – | 5 | – | 1 | 7 | – | 9 | – | 2 |
‡ – 2019 ACC Tournament champion + – Invited to the 2019 NCAA tournament; As of 17 December 2019; Rankings from United Soccer Coaches; Source:The ACC

The 2019 Virginia Cavaliers men's soccer team represented University of Virginia during the 2019 NCAA Division I men's soccer season. The Cavaliers were led by head coach George Gelnovatch, in his twenty-fourth season. They played home games at Klöckner Stadium. This was the team's 79th season playing organized men's college soccer and their 67th playing in the Atlantic Coast Conference. They had entered the NCAA Tournament as the No. 1 seed and were the runner-up.

== Previous season ==
The 2018 Virginia Cavaliers team finished the season with a final overall record of 10–4–3, and final ACC record of 3–3–2. The Cavaliers were seeded sixth-overall in the 2018 ACC Men's Soccer Tournament, where they were upset in the first round by Pittsburgh. The Cavaliers earned an at-large bid into the 2018 NCAA Division I Men's Soccer Tournament, continuing their record streak of consecutive NCAA appearances going at 38 appearances. In the NCAA Tournament, Virginia was seeded tenth overall in the tournament, where they reached third round before losing to Notre Dame.

== Player movement ==
=== Players leaving ===
| Name | Number | Pos. | Height | Weight | Year | Hometown | Reason for departure |
|---|---|---|---|---|---|---|---|
| Sergi Nus | 2 | DF | 6'2" | 185 | Senior | Barcelona, Spain | Graduated |
| Prosper Figbe | 4 | DF | 6'2" | 195 | Senior | Ilorin, Nigeria | Graduated |
| Simeon Okoro | 7 | FW | 5'10" | 155 | Senior | Weston, CT | Graduated |
| Kennedy Nwabia | 9 | FW | 6'2" | 210 | Senior | Owerri, Nigeria | Graduated |
| Daniel Barir | 15 | MF | 5'10" | 140 | Senior | Copenhagen, Denmark | Graduated |

=== Players arriving ===
| Name | Nat. | Hometown | Club | TDS Rating |
|---|---|---|---|---|
| Nick Berghold; MF | USA | Wingdale, NY | Black Rock FC | 3/5 stars |
| Isaiah Byrd; FW | USA | Gainesville, VA | BRYC Elite Academy | 2/5 stars |
| Axel Gunnarsson; FW | SWE | Gothenburg, Sweden | Swedish National Team | N/A |
| Philip Horton; FW | USA | New Albany, OH | Crew SC Academy | 3/5 stars |
| Reed Kessler; DF | USA | New York City, NY | BW Gottschee | 3/5 stars |
| Eben Noverr; DF | USA | Highlands Ranch, CO | Colorado Rapids | 3/5 stars |
| Andreas Ueland; DF | NOR | Bryne, Norway | Bryne FK | N/A |
| Jeremy Verley; MF | USA | Milton, MA | Boston Bolts | 4/5 stars |
| Matt Warbrick; MF | USA | Chattanooga, TN | Chattanooga FC Academy | 2/5 stars |

== Squad ==
=== Roster ===
Updated August 20, 2019

Note: Flags indicate national team as defined under FIFA eligibility rules; some limited exceptions apply. Players may hold more than one non-FIFA nationality.

| No. | Pos. | Nation | Player |
|---|---|---|---|
| 00 | GK | USA | Tyler Willen |
| 0 | GK | USA | Chris Shutler |
| 1 | GK | USA | Colin Shutler |
| 2 | DF | USA | Eben Noverr |
| 3 | DF | USA | Max Diamond |
| 4 | DF | USA | Reed Kessler |
| 5 | DF | USA | Henry Kessler |
| 6 | MF | JAM | Jeremy Verly |
| 7 | FW | SCO | Daniel Steedman |
| 8 | MF | NZL | Joe Bell |
| 9 | FW | USA | Daryl Dike |
| 10 | FW | ENG | Nathaniel Crofts |
| 11 | FW | TAN | Irakoze Donasiyano |
| 12 | DF | USA | Spencer Patton |

| No. | Pos. | Nation | Player |
|---|---|---|---|
| 13 | MF | USA | Bret Halsey |
| 15 | FW | USA | Philip Horton |
| 16 | FW | USA | Jerren Nixon |
| 17 | DF | NOR | Andreas Ueland |
| 18 | FW | SWE | Axel Gunnarsson |
| 19 | MF | USA | Nick Berghold |
| 20 | FW | ZIM | Cabrel Happi Kamseu |
| 21 | MF | USA | Aaron James |
| 23 | FW | NZL | Matthew Warbrick |
| 24 | MF | USA | Isaiah Byrd |
| 26 | MF | USA | Ben Grant |
| 27 | MF | USA | Beau Bradley |
| 30 | DF | GER | Robin Afamefuna |
| 99 | GK | USA | Marcel DaSilva |

=== Team management ===
| Position | Staff |
|---|---|
| Athletic director | Carla Williams |
| Head coach | George Gelnovatch |
| Associate Head Coach | Matt Chulis |
| Assistant coach | Ryan Hopkins |
| Operations Assistant | Carl Carpenter |

== Schedule ==
| Date Time, TV | Rank^{#} | Opponent^{#} | Result | Record | Site (Attendance) City, State |
Exhibition
| August 17*; 7:00 p.m. | No. 12 | Siena | T 1–1 | – (–) | Klöckner Stadium; Charlottesville, VA |
| August 20*; 6:00 a.m. | No. 12 | Villanova | W 3–1 | – (–) | Klöckner Stadium; Charlottesville, VA |
| August 24*; 7:00 p.m. | No. 12 | Drexel | W 3–0 | – (–) | Klöckner Stadium; Charlottesville, VA |
Regular Season
| August 30*; 7:00 p.m. | No. 12 | Pacific | W 2–0 | 1–0–0 (0–0–0) | Klöckner Stadium (3,770); Charlottesville, VA |
| September 2*; 7:00 p.m. | No. 12 | vs. No. 1 Maryland; Rivalry | W 2–0 | 2–0–0 (0–0–0) | Audi Field (1,884); Washington, D.C. |
| September 7*; 7:00 p.m. | No. 7 | High Point | W 1–0 | 3–0–0 (0–0–0) | Klöckner Stadium (1,578); Charlottesville, VA |
| September 13; 6:00 p.m. | No. 6 | at No. 2 Duke | W 3–1 | 4–0–0 (1–0–0) | Koskinen Stadium (1,092); Durham, NC |
| September 17*; 7:00 p.m. | No. 5 | Radford | W 1–0 | 5–0–0 (1–0–0) | Klöckner Stadium (1,043); Charlottesville, VA |
| September 20; 7:00 p.m. | No. 5 | NC State | W 2–0 | 6–0–0 (2–0–0) | Klöckner Stadium (3,858); Charlottesville, VA |
| September 23*; 7:00 p.m. | No. 5 | Western Michigan | W 1–0 ^{OT} | 7–0–0 (2–0–0) | Klöckner Stadium (957); Charlottesville, VA |
| September 28; 11:00 a.m. | No. 3 | at No. 21 Notre Dame | W 1–0 | 8–0–0 (3–0–0) | Alumni Stadium (646); South Bend, IN |
| October 1*; 7:00 p.m. | No. 1 | George Washington | W 3–0 | 9–0–0 (3–0–0) | Klöckner Stadium (1,160); Charlottesville, VA |
| October 4; 7:00 p.m. | No. 1 | No. 24 Louisville | W 2–0 | 10–0–0 (4–0–0) | Klöckner Stadium (3,008); Charlottesville, VA |
| October 11; 7:00 p.m. | No. 1 | at Boston College | T 1–1 ^{2OT} | 10–0–1 (4–0–1) | Newton Soccer Complex (242); Chestnut Hill, MA |
| October 15*; 7:00 p.m. | No. 1 | No. 18 James Madison | W 1–0 | 11–0–1 (4–0–1) | Klöckner Stadium (1,809); Charlottesville, VA |
| October 18; 7:00 p.m. | No. 1 | Pittsburgh | L 0–2 | 11–1–1 (4–1–1) | Klöckner Stadium (3,201); Charlottesville, VA |
| October 22*; 7:00 p.m. | No. 6 | Saint Louis | W 2–0 | 12–1–1 (4–1–1) | Klöckner Stadium (1,021); Charlottesville, VA |
| October 25; 7:00 p.m. | No. 6 | at No. 25 Virginia Tech; Rivalry | W 2–0 | 13–1–1 (5–1–1) | Thompson Field (1,738); Blacksburg, VA |
| November 1; 7:00 p.m. | No. 4 | North Carolina; Rivalry | W 2–1 ^{OT} | 14–1–1 (6–1–1) | Klöckner Stadium (2,193); Charlottesville, VA |
ACC Tournament
| November 10; 1:00 p.m. | (2) No. 4 | (10) Syracuse; Quarterfinals | W 2–1 | 15–1–1 | Klöckner Stadium (1,525); Charlottesville, VA |
| November 13; 4:00 p.m. | (2) No. 2 | (3) No. 7 Wake Forest; Semifinals | W 1–0 | 16–1–1 | Klöckner Stadium (586); Charlottesville, VA |
| November 17; 12:00 p.m. | (2) No. 2 | vs. (1) No. 1 Clemson; Final | W 3–1 | 17–1–1 | WakeMed Soccer Park (1,330); Cary, NC |
NCAA Tournament
| November 24*; 1:00 p.m. | (1) No. 1 | No. 24 Campbell; Second Round | W 2–0 | 18–1–1 | Klöckner Stadium (1,460); Charlottesville, VA |
| November 30*; 7:00 p.m. | (1) No. 1 | (16) No. 14 St. John's; Third Round | W 3–0 | 19–1–1 | Klöckner Stadium (815); Charlottesville, VA |
| December 6*; 7:00 p.m. | (1) No. 1 | (8) No. 5 SMU; Quarterfinals | W 3–2 | 20–1–1 | Klöckner Stadium (1,674); Charlottesville, VA |
| December 13*; 6:00 p.m. | (1) No. 1 | vs. (4) No. 9 Wake Forest; College Cup Semifinals | W 2–1 | 21–1–1 | WakeMed Soccer Park (9,862); Cary, NC |
| December 16*; 6:00 p.m. | (1) No. 1 | vs. (3) No. 2 Georgetown; College Cup Championship | L 3–3 (6–7 PKs) ^{2OT} | 21–2–1 | WakeMed Soccer Park (8,413); Cary, NC |
*Non-conference game. ^{#}Rankings from United Soccer Coaches. (#) Tournament seedings in parentheses.

== Awards and honors ==
| Recipient | Award | Date | Ref. |
|---|---|---|---|
| Irakoze Donasiyano | ACC Offensive Player of the Week | September 3, 2019 | |
| Colin Shutler | ACC Defensive Player of the Week | September 9, 2019 | |
| Colin Shutler | ACC Defensive Player of the Week | September 30, 2019 | |
| Robin Afamefuna | ACC Defensive Player of the Week | October 7, 2019 | |
| Daryl Dike | ACC Offensive Player of the Week | October 28, 2019 | |
| Joe Bell | ACC Midfielder of the Year | November 13, 2019 | |
| Colin Shutler | All-ACC First Team | November 13, 2019 | |
| Joe Bell | All-ACC First Team | November 13, 2019 | |
| Daryl Dike | All-ACC Second Team | November 13, 2019 | |
| Henry Kessler | All-ACC Second Team | November 13, 2019 | |
| Robin Afamefuna | All-ACC Third Team | November 13, 2019 | |
| Andreas Ueland | All-ACC Third Team | November 13, 2019 | |
| Irakoze Donasiyano | All-ACC Third Team | November 13, 2019 | |
| Andreas Ueland | All-ACC Freshman Team | November 13, 2019 | |
| Nathaniel Crofts | All-ACC Tournament Team | November 17, 2019 | |
| Bret Halsey | All-ACC Tournament Team | November 17, 2019 | |
| Cabrel Happi Kamseu | All-ACC Tournament Team | November 17, 2019 | |
| Henry Kessler | All-ACC Tournament Team | November 17, 2019 | |

== 2020 MLS Super Draft ==
| Player | Team | Round | Pick # | Position |
|---|---|---|---|---|
| Daryl Dike | Orlando City SC | 1 | 5 | FW |
| Henry Kessler | New England Revolution | 1 | 6 | DF |
| Robin Afamefuna | Colorado Rapids | 2 | 37 | DF |

== Rankings ==
Ranking movements Legend: ██ Increase in ranking ██ Decrease in ranking ( ) = First-place votes
| | Week | | | | | | | | | | | | | | | | | |
| Poll | Pre | 1 | 2 | 3 | 4 | 5 | 6 | 7 | 8 | 9 | 10 | 11 | 12 | 13 | 14 | 15 | 16 | Final |
|---|---|---|---|---|---|---|---|---|---|---|---|---|---|---|---|---|---|---|
| United Soccer | 12 | 7 | 6 | 5 | 3 (4) | 1 (20) | 1 (25) | 1 (22) | 6 | 4 | 4 (1) | 2 (6) | 1 (27) | Not released | | | | 2 |
| TopDrawer Soccer | 15 | 15 | 16 | 3 | 3 | 2 | 1 | 1 | 1 | 3 | 3 | 3 | 1 | 1 | 1 | 1 | 1 | 2 |
