= Nicholas Addlery =

Jamaican footballer (born 1981)

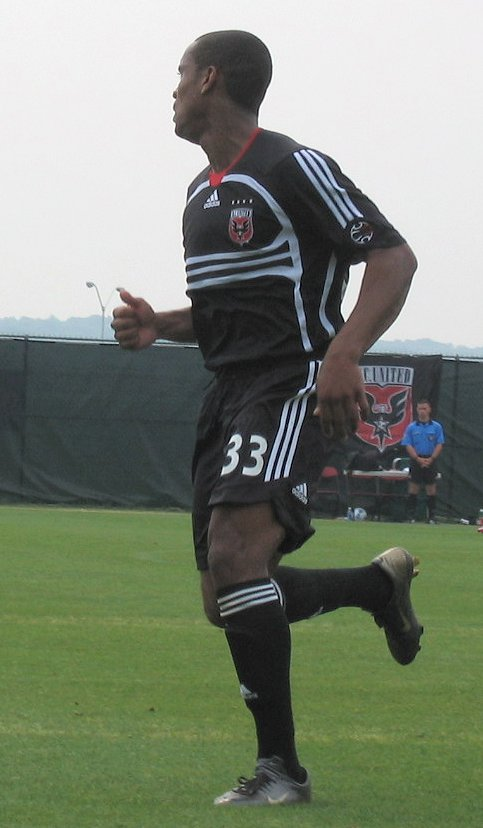
- Nicholas Addlery (2007)

Personal information
- Full name: Nicholas Duane Addlery
- Date of birth: 7 December 1981 (age 44)
- Place of birth: Kingston, Jamaica
- Height: 6 ft 1 in (1.85 m)
- Position: Forward

Team information
- Current team: Peachtree City MOBA (manager)

Youth career
- 1991–1994: Cooreville Gardens
- 1994–1999: Real Mona
- 1999–2002: California Vulcans

Senior career*
Years	Team	Apps	(Gls)
2003–2004	Starworld Strikers	14	(12)
2005	San Juan Jabloteh	16	(3)
2006	Đồng Nai FC	5	(2)
2007	D.C. United	11	(1)
2008	Vancouver Whitecaps	27	(6)
2009–2012	Puerto Rico Islanders	108	(48)
2009	→ Águila (loan)	7	(5)
2013	Carolina RailHawks	5	(1)

International career^{‡}
2000–2001	Jamaica U20	2	(0)
2004	Jamaica U23	4	(1)
2009–2010	Jamaica	6	(1)

Managerial career
- 2018–: Peachtree City MOBA (assistant)
- * Club domestic league appearances and goals as of 16 June 2012 ‡ National team caps and goals as of 3 March 2011

Nicholas Addlery (born 7 December 1981) is a former Jamaican football player who is a former assistant for PDL club Peachtree City MOBA.

== Playing career ==
=== Youth and college ===
Addlery attended high school at Jamaica College, and played in the Manning Cup. He played for Cooreville Gardens (U13, U16, U20) in the Syd Bartlett League, Real Mona-U20 in the Major League, and Alvernia Prep.

While earning his bachelor's degree in business administration at Division II California University of Pennsylvania from 1999 to 2002, Addlery was a two-time NSCAA/Umbro All-Region selection (2000 and 2002). He was a four-time first-team PSAC all-star and PSAC Rookie of the Year in 1999. In 75 career games, he scored 54 goals and recorded 20 assists for the Vulcans. He ranks second on the Cal U career goals and points (124) lists and fifth in career assists.

=== Professional ===
After college, Addlery turned pro as the inaugural Jamaican in the T&T Professional Football League, playing for Starworld Strikers in 2003 and CL Financial San Juan Jabloteh in 2005. In 2006, he played football as the first Jamaican in Vietnam for SHB Đà Nẵng F.C. (1st Division). He had signed with the Virginia Beach Mariners for the 2007 season, but within the month the franchise, caught in the midst of an ownership squabble, was terminated by the United Soccer Leagues. After a trial, he was signed by D.C. United in April 2007, scoring his first MLS goal on 28 June, a game winner against the Colorado Rapids at RFK Stadium.

On 12 October 2008 he helped the Whitecaps capture their second USL First Division Championship beating the Puerto Rico Islanders 2–1 in Vancouver.

On 5 November 2008 he was released along with teammate Omar Jarun.

In January 2009, Addlery traveled to Puerto Rico to join the Puerto Rico Islanders of the USL-1 at their training camp on trial, signing with the club on 18 February. He had an immediate impact, scoring in both games of the Quarterfinals series against C.D. Marathón in the CONCACAF Champions League. The goals helped his club towards the semifinals in that competition. He also scored one of the two goals against C.D.S.C. Cruz Azul of Mexico in the 2-0 Islanders win in the first leg of the semifinal. Addlery finished the 2009 season with 15 goals in all competitions for the Islanders. In November 2009, he signed on loan for Salvadoran side Águila of the Salvadoran Primera División, and scored 5 goals during his stint with the club. In 2010, after spending a few weeks training with Cruz Azul in Mexico, Addlery returned to the Islanders where he is expected to lead the attacking frontline. Addlery scored 2 goals in three matches as he led the Islanders to the 2010 Caribbean Club Championship in Trinidad and Tobago. Although Addlery has continued scoring goals, Puerto Rico Islanders have struggled midway through USSF D2 season. In July 2010 Addlery scored 2 goals, leading the Puerto Islanders in a 4–1 defeat of then MLS league leaders, LA Galaxy which paved the way for their progression to the group stages of the CONCACAF Champions League for the third consecutive year. Addlery continued his scoring form and has scored three goals in three games in the CONCACAF Champions League. Addlery finished 2010 with 15 goals again in all competitions leading Puerto Rico to the USSF Division 2 Pro League title. In February 2011, Addlery resigned with the Puerto Rico Islanders in the NASL and was also named team captain. He is the All-Time Leading Goal Scorer in PR Islanders FC history. In January 2013, Addlery signed with the Carolina Railhawks.

=== International ===
He made his first international appearance as a member of Jamaica national U-20 team in the qualifying matches for the 2001 FIFA World Youth Championship in Argentina. Addlery was a member of the 2004 U23 Jamaica national football team during the Olympic qualifying tournament in Mexico. Addlery then received his first Jamaica senior national team call under John Barnes in May 2009 and eventually was named to the 2009 Gold Cup squad. He featured in matches against Haiti, Peru, El Salvador and Costa Rica

== Managerial career ==
=== Peachtree City MOBA ===
Prior to the 2018 Premier Development League Season, Addlery was hired by Georgia-based club Peachtree City MOBA to be an assistant with the senior team under his former Whitecaps teammate Omar Jarun.

== Honours ==
=== D.C. United ===
- Supporter's Shield Winner (1): 2007

=== Vancouver Whitecaps ===
- USL First Division Championship Winner (1): 2008

=== Puerto Rico Islanders ===
- CFU Club Championship Winner (2): 2010, 2011
- USSF Division 2 Pro League Winner (1): 2010

== See also ==
- List of foreign MLS players
