= Jonathan Parpeix =

French footballer (born 1990)

Personal information
- Date of birth: 4 March 1990 (age 36)
- Place of birth: Nîmes, France
- Height: 1.80 m (5 ft 11 in)
- Position: Midfielder

Team information
- Current team: EUGA Ardziv

Senior career*
Years	Team	Apps	(Gls)
2010–2015	Nîmes Olympique	103	(2)
2015–2016	Apollon Smyrnis	25	(1)
2016–2017	Martigues	18	(0)
2017	FC Miami City	14	(0)
2017–2019	Marignane Gignac	38	(1)
2019–	EUGA Ardziv	8	(0)
- * Club domestic league appearances and goals as of 20:41, 19 January 2020 (UTC)

Jonathan Parpeix (born 4 March 1990) is a French professional footballer who currently plays as a defender for EUGA Ardziv.

== Career ==
He made his debut as a professional player in Ligue 2 for Nîmes Olympique on 10 September 2010, coming on as a substitute for Olivier Davidas in the 2–0 win over Angers.

In 2017, Jonathan played a promising season with the FC Miami City and was named All-league player in the Southern conference where he finished the 2017 regular season with eight assists – second-most across the PDL.
