= Evan Finnegan =

Irish footballer

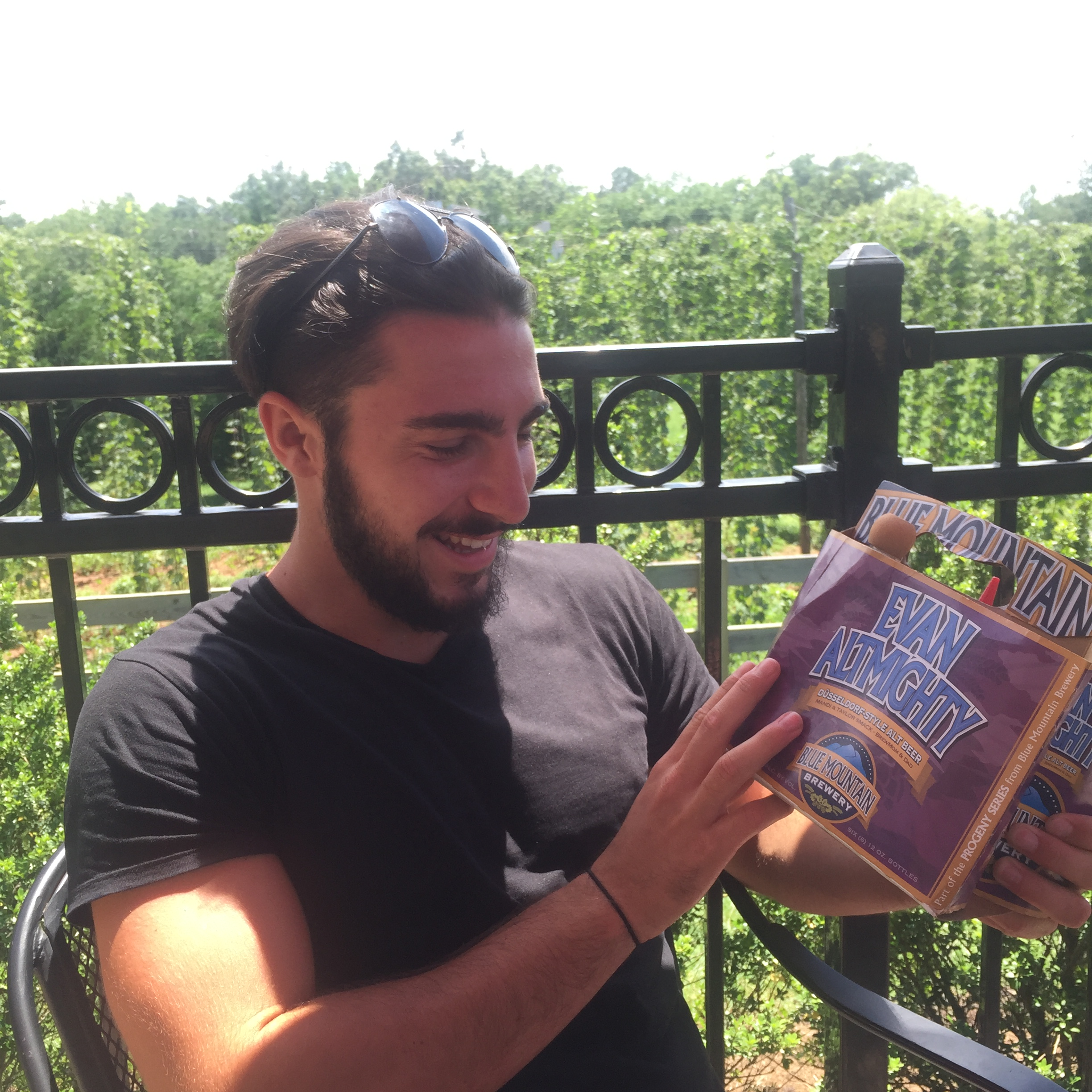
- Finnegan in 2016

Personal information
- Full name: Evan Christopher Finnegan
- Date of birth: 5 August 1995 (age 31)
- Place of birth: Clontarf, Dublin, Ireland
- Position: Full-back

Youth career
- Cherry Orchard
- Home Farm
- 2011–2013: Doncaster Rovers

College career
Years	Team	Apps	(Gls)
2015–2016	Monroe College	34	(14)
2017–2019	Keiser University	14	(5)

Senior career*
Years	Team	Apps	(Gls)
2012–2014	Doncaster Rovers	4	(0)
2015	Cabinteely FC	14	(0)
2017	Reading United	11	(1)
2018	Treasure Coast Tritons	5	(1)

International career
2011	Republic of Ireland U17	1	(0)
2012	Republic of Ireland U18	2	(0)
2013	Republic of Ireland U19	1	(0)
- * Club domestic league appearances and goals

Evan Christopher Finnegan (born 5 August 1995) is an Irish former footballer who played as an attacking full−back. He has also represented the Ireland at various youth levels.

== Playing career ==
=== Youth ===
Mainly playing as a full back, Finnegan played for both Cherry Orchard and Home Farm in his native Dublin. He was on the FAI's Emerging Talent Programme and has represented his country at various youth levels.

After trials with Manchester City, Blackburn and Portsmouth he joined Doncaster Centre of Excellence in June 2011.

=== Doncaster Rovers ===
Finnegan was part of the Youth Alliance Cup winning Rovers team in 2012 who won 4–0 over Exeter City at Exeter. He made his full debut in a 1–1 draw with Crewe Alexandra.

=== Cabinteely FC ===
Finnegan signed for newest LOI Side Cabinteely FC in February 2015.

=== College ===
Played collegiately for Monroe College in New York City from 2015 to 2016 and Keiser University in West Palm Beach, Florida from 2017 to 2019. While at Keiser, Finnegan was a two-time All-Conference selection and NAIA Honorable Mention All-American as a Senior.

== International career ==
=== Republic of Ireland ===
Finnegan earned his first international cap on 15 September 2011 when he played for the Republic of Ireland U17s in a friendly against Serbia in Wexford. On 13 and 15 November 2012, he represented his country at the under 18 level in two friendly games against Switzerland in Monthey. He made his debut for the Republic of Ireland U19 squad in a 0–1 defeat to Norway at the Carlisle Grounds, Bray on 13 August 2013.

== Coaching career ==
National Coaches of the Year winner for the 2021 season with Keiser University, helping win the programs first ever men's soccer national championship in school history.
