= Sergi Nus =

Spanish footballer

Personal information
- Full name: Sergi Nus Casanova
- Date of birth: 23 December 1996 (age 29)
- Place of birth: Barcelona, Spain
- Height: 1.88 m (6 ft 2 in)
- Position: Defender

Youth career
- Gimnàstic
- Reus

College career
Years	Team	Apps	(Gls)
2015	Fresno Pacific Sunbirds	19	(1)
2016–2018	Virginia Cavaliers	41	(9)
2019	Duke Blue Devils	11	(0)

Senior career*
Years	Team	Apps	(Gls)
2015–2017	Fresno Fuego	39	(1)
2019	North Carolina FC U23	5	(0)
2020	South Georgia Tormenta 2	0	(0)
2021–22	South Georgia Tormenta	23	(0)
- * Club domestic league appearances and goals as of 2 November 2021

Sergi Nus Casanova (born 23 December 1996) is a former professional Spanish footballer who played as a defender for South Georgia Tormenta in USL League One from 2020 until 2022 after his time in Lithuania with FK Kauno Žalgiris.

Nus is the current assistant coach at Oregon State University for the Men's Soccer team under Terry Boss, the former assistant coach of the US National Team.

== Career ==
=== Youth ===
Nus spent time with the academy sides at Gimnàstic Tarragona and Reus. After accomplishing multiples u-15 and u-18 championships and rejecting multiple professional offers, Nus decided to move to the United States in order to pursue new challenges as student-athlete.

=== College and amateur ===
Nus moved to the United States to play college soccer in 2015, attending Fresno Pacific University where he made 19 appearances and scoring 1 goal in his freshman season, helping Fresno Pacific win the PacWest Conference championship and being named All-PacWest Conference Second Team.

In 2016, Nus transferred to the University of Virginia, playing two full seasons for the Cavaliers and missing the 2018 season due to injury. During his time at Virginia, Nus made 41 appearances, scored 9 goals and was named Third-Team All-Region by NSCAA, Third-Team All-ACC honoree, United Soccer Coaches Second Team All-South Region selection, was named to the ACC All-Academic Team and also listed on the ACC Academic Honor Roll.

Nus played his senior season at Duke University in 2019, making 11 appearances.

During his time at college, Nus also appeared for Fresno Fuego in the USL League Two between 2015 and 2017, and spent a summer with North Carolina FC U23 in 2019. Nus was set to play with South Georgia Tormenta 2 in 2020, but the season was cancelled due to the COVID-19 pandemic.

=== Professional ===
On 11 December 2020, Nus signed with South Georgia Tormenta of USL League One ahead of their 2021 season. He made his professional debut on 17 April 2021, starting against Fort Lauderdale CF.

== Personal ==
Sergi's brother is Gerard Nus, a current football coach.
