= Matt Wiesenfarth =

American soccer player (born 1993)

Personal information
- Full name: Matthew Wiesenfarth
- Date of birth: July 5, 1993 (age 33)
- Place of birth: Chicago, Illinois, United States
- Height: 5 ft 11 in (1.80 m)
- Position: Forward

College career
Years	Team	Apps	(Gls)
2011–2015	UC Davis Aggies	86	(17)

Senior career*
Years	Team	Apps	(Gls)
2016	Burlingame Dragons	9	(2)
2016–2017	Canterbury United	17	(1)
2017	Sacramento Gold	6	(9)
2017	Burlingame Dragons	11	(13)
2017	Sacramento Republic	9	(1)
2018	Sacramento Gold	0	(0)
2019	San Francisco Glens	1	(0)
2019	Sacramento Gold	8	(8)
- * Club domestic league appearances and goals as of 13:01, 26 August 2019 (UTC)

Matt Wiesenfarth (born July 5, 1993) is an American soccer player.

== Career ==
Wiesenfarth played five years of college soccer at University of California, Davis between 2011 and 2015.

Following college Wiesenfarth appeared for Premier Development League side Burlingame Dragons in 2016, before moving to New Zealand to play for Canterbury United. He returned to California to play with NPSL club Sacramento Gold before returning to the Dragons, where he scored 13 goals in 11 games to earn a piece of the Western Conference scoring title.

On August 11, 2017, Wiesenfarth signed for United Soccer League side Sacramento Republic. After his contract was not renewed, he returned to Sacramento Gold before signing with the USL League Two's San Francisco Glens in May 2019.
