= Elliot Hersey Goodwin =

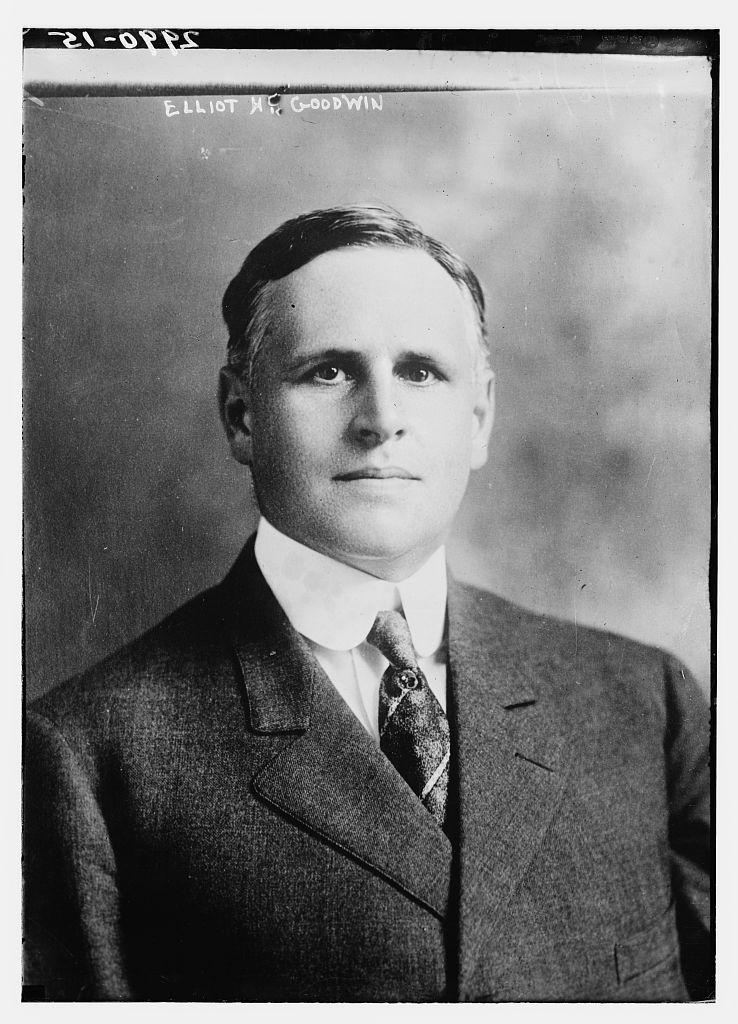

Elliot Hersey Goodwin (January 6, 1874 – February 16, 1931), was the secretary of the United States Chamber of Commerce, Secretary of the National Civil Service Reform League, and Chairman of Civil Service Commission.

== Biography ==
He was born in Cambridge, Massachusetts on January 6, 1874, the son of Hersey Bradford and Ellen Christina (née Hopkinson) Goodwin. After graduating from Browne & Nichols school, he attended Harvard University where he earned a Bachelor's (1895) and Master's degree (1896) in History. He then attended the Leipzig University from 1896 to 1898, returned to Harvard as an assistant teacher for a year, then returned to Leipzig to earn his Doctor of Philosophy in 1900.

After working with the National Civil Service Reform League and New York Civil Service Reform Association for two years, he became secretary of the two organizations in 1902. During his time there, in 1910 he lectured courses in municipal government at Harvard. In August 1912, he became general secretary of the United States Chamber of Commerce and moved to Washington, D.C.

On February 19, 1914, he married Isabel Montague Geer. He died on February 16, 1931.
