= K–W United =

K-W United may refer to:

- KW United, Canadian semi-pro club that plays in the Ontario Premier League (originally known as Waterloo United)
- K–W United FC (2011–2017), former Canadian semi-pro club that played in the Premier Development League (originally known as Hamilton FC Rage)
- K-W United FC (women) (2006–2014), former Canadian women's soccer club that played in the USL W-League (originally known as Hamilton Lady Avalanche and Hamilton FC Rage)
