= La Moderna Field =

Baseball park in Cleburne, Texas, US

- Interactive map of La Moderna Field
- Former names: The Depot at Cleburne Station (2017–2024)
- Location: 1906 Brazzell Blvd; Cleburne, TX 76033
- Coordinates: 32°22′27.9″N 97°24′45.7″W
- Capacity: 3,750 (1,750 fixed seats)
- Surface: Synthetic turf
- Field size: Left Field: 335 feet (102 m); Left-Center Field: 383 feet (117 m); Center Field: 400 feet (120 m); Right-Center Field: 375 feet (114 m); Right Field: 320 feet (98 m)

Construction
- Opened: May 18, 2017

Tenants
- Cleburne Railroaders (NAPB) (2017–present); FC Cleburne (USL2) (2017–2018)

La Moderna Field is a baseball stadium located in Cleburne, Texas, United States, that opened on May 18, 2017. The ballpark has 1,750 fixed seats, plus grass berm seating and several group seating areas, for a total capacity of 3,750. The Cleburne Railroaders baseball team of the independent National Association of Professional Baseball (NAPB) plays its home games at the stadium. FC Cleburne, a soccer team of the Premier Development League, played their games at The Depot from May 27, 2017, until dissolving the following year.

The ballpark hosted the Southern Collegiate Athletic Conference baseball tournament from 2018-2024 and the Heartland conference from 2017-2019.
