= Patrick Nielsen (footballer) =

Danish footballer (born 1996)

Personal information
- Full name: Patrick Nielsen
- Date of birth: September 18, 1996 (age 30)
- Place of birth: Copenhagen, Denmark
- Height: 1.93 m (6 ft 4 in)
- Position: Defender

Youth career
- 2010–2013: Brøndby
- 2014–2015: AB

College career
Years	Team	Apps	(Gls)
2016	Cincinnati Bearcats	17	(0)
2018–2019	Michigan State Spartans	33	(3)

Senior career*
Years	Team	Apps	(Gls)
2017	Hvidovre	0	(0)
2017	Nashville SC U23	9	(1)
2018–2019	Flint City Bucks	10	(0)
2020	Atlanta United 2	10	(0)
2021–201?	Taarbæk IF		
- * Club domestic league appearances and goals as of 4 December 2020

Patrick Nielsen (born September 18, 1996) is a Danish footballer.

== Career ==
Nielsen played with the academy teams at Brøndby and AB.

In 2016, Nielsen moved to the United States to play college soccer at the University of Cincinnati. During his freshman year, Nielsen made 17 appearances and tallied two assists. During his sophomore year, Nielsen didn't appear for the Bearcats, but played back in Denmark with Hvidovre IF and in the USL PDL with Nashville SC U23.

In 2018, Nielsen transferred to Michigan State University, where he played for two seasons, making 33 appearances, scoring three goals and tallying two assists for the Spartans.

Nielsen also appeared in the USL League Two with Flint City Bucks in 2018 and 2019.

On 9 January 2020, Nielsen was selected 23rd overall in the 2020 MLS SuperDraft by Atlanta United. On 29 June 2020, it was announced that Nielsen would join Atlanta's USL Championship side Atlanta United 2. He made his professional debut on 5 August 2020, appearing as a half-time substitute during a 1–1 draw with Charleston Battery.

Nielsen left the club at the turn of the year when his contract expired and returned to Denmark, where he began playing for the amateur club Taarbæk IF.
