= Tanner Dieterich =

American soccer player (born 1998)

Personal information
- Date of birth: May 4, 1998 (age 28)
- Place of birth: Nashville, Tennessee, United States
- Height: 1.83 m (6 ft 0 in)
- Positions: Defensive midfielder; defender

Youth career
- 2014–2015: IMG Academy
- 2015–2016: Real Salt Lake

College career
Years	Team	Apps	(Gls)
2016–2019	Clemson Tigers	75	(9)

Senior career*
Years	Team	Apps	(Gls)
2016	Nashville FC	1	(0)
2017	Nashville SC U23	8	(1)
2020	Nashville SC	0	(0)
2020	→ Chattanooga Red Wolves (loan)	12	(2)

International career^{‡}
2014–2015	United States U17	6	(0)
2016	United States U19	4	(0)
- * Club domestic league appearances and goals as of October 25, 2020 ‡ National team caps and goals as of August 15, 2020

Tanner Dieterich (born May 4, 1998) is an American soccer player who plays as a midfielder.

== Career ==
=== Youth ===
After time with various youth teams in his native Tennessee, Dieterich spent time with both the Real Salt Lake academy in Arizona, as well as the IMG Academy in Florida.

=== College and amateur ===
Dieterich played four years of college soccer at Clemson University between 2016 and 2019, making 75 appearances, scoring 9 goals and tallying 13 assists. He captained the Tigers for three seasons and in 2019 he was named Second Team All-ACC.

While playing at college, Dieterich appeared for NPSL side Nashville FC in 2016, and in the USL PDL for Nashville SC U23.

=== Professional ===
On January 9, 2020, Dieterich was selected 28th overall in the 2020 MLS SuperDraft by Nashville SC. On February 25, 2020, Dieterich signed with Nashville.

On August 6, 2020, Dieterich was loaned out to USL League One side Charlotte Independence for the remainder of the season. He made his professional debut on August 15, 2020, appearing as a 67th-minute substitute in a 1–0 loss to Greenville Triumph.

Dieterich's contract with Nashville expired following the 2020 season.
