= Malick Mbaye (footballer, born 1996) =

Senegalese footballer

Personal information
- Date of birth: 24 November 1996 (age 29)
- Place of birth: Dakar, Senegal
- Height: 6 ft 0 in (1.83 m)
- Position: Defender

Youth career
- 2013–2016: Montverde Academy

College career
Years	Team	Apps	(Gls)
2016–2019	Clemson Tigers	72	(7)

Senior career*
Years	Team	Apps	(Gls)
2017	SIMA Águilas	12	(4)
2019	Greenville FC	3	(1)
2020–2021	North Carolina FC	25	(1)

Managerial career
- 2023: Clemson (assistant)
- * Club domestic league appearances and goals as of 18 April 2022

Malick Mbaye (born 24 November 1996) is a Senegalese professional footballer who most recently played as a defender for North Carolina FC in USL League One.

== Career ==
=== Amateur ===
Mbaye played for Soccer Institute at Montverde Academy in Florida. In 2017, he played for SIMA Águilas of the Premier Development League, scoring four goals in 12 games.

In 2019, Mbaye played with Greenville FC of the National Premier Soccer League.

=== College ===
Mbaye played college soccer at Clemson University from 2016 and 2019. In his freshman year, he was named to the ACC All-Freshmen Team. In his senior season, he was named ACC Men's Soccer Defensive Player of the Year.

=== Professional ===
Mbaye was drafted 33rd overall in the 2020 MLS SuperDraft by Toronto FC. He attended pre-season with Toronto, but left their training camp and signed with North Carolina FC of the USL Championship. He made his debut with the team when he entered as a substitution during a match against Charlotte Independence on 5 September 2020.
