= Nashville SC U23 =

American soccer team

- Full name: Nashville Soccer Club U23
- Founded: 2016; 10 years ago
- Dissolved: 2017; 9 years ago
- Stadium: Vanderbilt Soccer/Lacrosse Complex
- Capacity: 2,400
- Owner: DMD Soccer
- League: Premier Development League
- Website: http://www.nashvillesc.com

Nashville Soccer Club U-23 was an American professional soccer team based in Nashville, Tennessee. The team played only one season in the Premier Development League in 2017. It served as the under-23 team for Nashville SC of the United Soccer League.

== History ==
The club was announced in September 2016. It is owned by the ownership group of Nashville SC: David Dill, president and chief operating officer of LifePoint Health; Christopher Redhage, co-founder of ProviderTrust, a health care software company, and former pro soccer player; and Marcus Whitney, president of Jumpstart Foundry, a health care innovation fund, and former chairman of Nashville FC, the city's existing amateur team.

They finished third in the PDL South Atlantic Division with 8 wins, 4 ties and 2 losses and barely missed the playoffs. Martim Galvao was the leading scorer with 7 goals.

== Year-by-year ==
Year	Division	League	Regular season	Playoffs	Open Cup
2017	4	USL PDL	3rd, South Atlantic	Did not qualify	Did not enter

== Roster ==
As of May 16, 2017

No.	Position	Nation	Player
0	GK	USA	Chris Zappia
1	GK	USA	William Pyle
2	MF	USA	Damilola Omitaomu
3	DF	DEN	Patrick Nielsen
4	DF	USA	Nick Dauchot
5	DF	USA	Kyle McLagan
6	DF	USA	Brad Ross
7	DF	USA	Dalton Pando
8	MF	FRA	Alex Stoiljkovic
9	FW	VEN	Hector Cantele
10	FW	USA	Ivan Alvarado
11	DF	USA	Tanner Dieterich
12	DF	USA	Tevyn Henry
13	MF	USA	Fletcher Ekern
14	FW	USA	Blake Wilson
15	DF	ESP	Juan Sanchez
16	MF	USA	Alec Velez
17	FW	USA	Shak Adams
18	MF	USA	Joseph Kerridge
19	DF	USA	Will Emerson
20	FW	NOR	Trygve Ellingstad
21	DF	RSA	Joel Kazhila
22	FW	USA	Logan Paynter
23	DF	VEN	Carlos Hurtado
24	MF	USA	Eduardo Reza
25	FW	USA	Lucas Altman
26	DF	CHI	Cristobal Allendes
27	MF	USA	Adam Bruce
28	MF	POR	Martim Galvao
29	MF	USA	Johnny Heckman
30	FW	USA	Tyler Long
