= Ravy Truchot =

French businessman

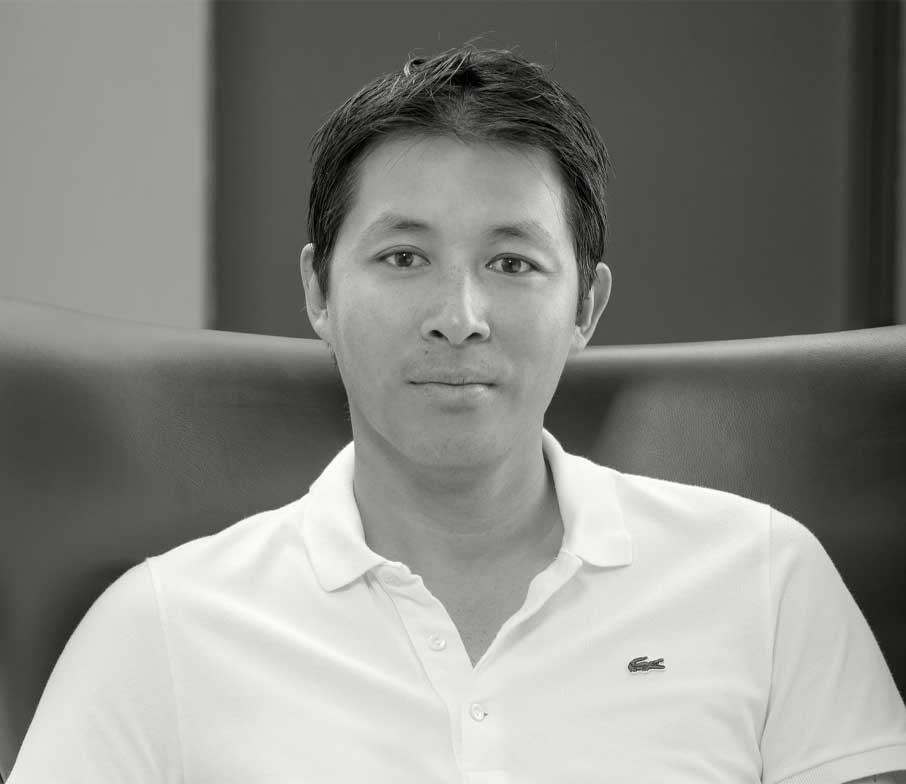
- Portrait of Truchot
- Born: June 2, 1972 (age 54)
- Title: Entrepreneur, Owner & Investor in Technology, Digital, Lifestyle and Sport Industries

Ravy Truchot is a French entrepreneur and investor in technology, digital, lifestyle, and sports industries. He oversees operations in the US, Europe, and Africa. Truchot is most famous for having co-founded Gleeden, an extra-marital dating website for married and unfaithful people.

== Early career ==
After gaining valuable experience at Amadeus, Microsoft, and various technology startups, he founded his first startup, SkyRecon, in 2003. SkyRecon Systems and its flagship product, Stormshield, became global leaders in endpoint protection platforms. The company successfully raised $12 million and was later acquired by Airbus Group in 2009.

== Entrepreneurship Ventures ==
Following SkyRecon, Ravy Truchot ventured into diverse entrepreneurial pursuits. He founded Blackdivine, managing a portfolio of brands, including Touchvibes, WeAreReputation, UGotAWish, ToysLegend, CheckHimOut, StyleRecovery, Gleeden, and more. His ventures extend into industries such as hospitality with the Ritz-Carlton hotels or food with projects like JustEgg or Fraiche.

== Football and Youth Development ==
In 2014, he established Strive Football Group to combine his entrepreneurial acumen with a passion for football and youth development. Through Strive Football Group, he collaborated with Paris Saint-Germain (PSG) to establish academies across the U.S., Canada, and the Caribbean Islands. Key initiatives include:

- The International Center of European Football (ICEF): Founded in 2014, ICEF has campuses worldwide, focusing on the training and development of young talents. ICEF is based in Miami, Evian (France), and Saly,(Senegal).
- PSG Academy North America: Established in 2015, PSG Academy North America operates in multiple locations.
- PSG Academy Senegal based in Saly and Dakar.
- PSG Academy Pro Greater Geneva based in Evian (France).

== Ownership of Football Clubs ==
In addition to fostering talent through academies, Ravy Truchot owns two football clubs:

- FC Miami City (2014): Miami's official team in the USL League Two.
- Thonon Evian Grand Genève FC (2017): Formerly Thonon Évian Savoie Football Club, a professional entity in the Greater Geneva area.

== Strive Capital and Global Sports Initiatives ==
As a global figure in the sports industry, he continues to contribute to the entrepreneurial landscape through Strive Capital, the venture capital division of Strive Football Group. It focuses on financial investments in sports clubs, professionals, brands, and organizations.
