= FC Miami City =

- Full name: Futbol Club Miami City
- Nickname: Champions
- Founded: January 20, 2014; 12 years ago
- Stadium: Central Broward Park; Lauderhill, Florida
- Capacity: 20,000
- Owner: Ravy Truchot
- League: USL League Two; USL W League
- 2025: 4th of South Florida Division (men's)
- Website: fcmiamicity.com
Home colors

FC Miami City (FCMC) is an American soccer club based in South Florida. They play in the USL League Two, the fourth division of the US soccer league system.

The club consists of both men and women teams competing in the United Soccer League (USL) and the youth academy of Paris Saint-Germain in the United States.

FC Miami City's men and women teams, as well as the Paris Saint-Germain Academy USA teams, are deeply connected on and off the pitch. The club's culture leads to players and staff collaborating to enable the youth to get on the professional path.

== History ==
Since 2014, FC Miami City is a fully affiliated member of the United Soccer League (USL), North America's largest professional soccer organization that oversees the USL Championship, USL League One, USL League Two, USL W, and USL Academy.

In 2021, FC Miami City joined the USL Academy where young players are provided opportunities to compete in a platform with professional standards to develop and gain experience to reach their club' USL first team and gain exposure needed to succeed at the next level.

At the start of 2022, FC Miami entered the USL W League, the nation's premier women's development league, as co-founder. Entering the league established the club's commitment to developing the next generation of young female talent by bringing elite women's soccer to South Florida. For future generations of women soccer players, the league provides exposure opportunities both on and off the field, and strengthen the women's soccer pipeline between collegiate and professional soccer.

== Ownership ==
President

- Ravy Truchet

Honorary president

- Alain Truchet

== Stadium ==
The club plays its home games at the Paris Saint-Germain Academy USA Campus (Central Broward Park) in Lauderhill, Florida.

== Colors ==
The team's colors and logos include blue, white, and red.

== Men's team ==
=== Current squad (USL 2) ===
Note: Flags indicate national team as defined under FIFA eligibility rules; some limited exceptions apply. Players may hold more than one non-FIFA nationality.

| No. | Pos. | Nation | Player |
|---|---|---|---|
| 1 | GK | | Franco Acerbi |
| 2 | DF | | Juan Manuel Collazo |
| 3 | DF | | Ivan Arenas |
| 4 | DF | | Joaquin Domber |
| 5 | DF | | Raheem Small |
| 6 | DF | | Simon Vasquez |
| 7 | FW | | Ronaldo Belgrove |
| 8 | MF | | Hugo Acosta |
| 9 | FW | | Giovanni Williams |
| 10 | MF | | Michael Reid |
| 11 | MF | | Yohan Ribot |
| 12 | DF | | Tyrese Powell |
| 13 | DF | | Francisco Aguirre |

| No. | Pos. | Nation | Player |
|---|---|---|---|
| 15 | MF | | Santiago Montoya |
| 17 | DF | | Bryan Bakboord |
| 18 | MF | | Mateo Amado |
| 19 | MF | | Daniel Amado |
| 21 | MF | | Bryan Sanchez |
| 22 | DF | | Josduar Serrano |
| 23 | MF | | Matias Pourrain |
| 24 | FW | | Facundo Cisterna |
| 25 | FW | | Andoni Garrogerricaecheb |
| 77 | GK | | Marko Rajic |
| 98 | DF | | Luis Constantini |
| 99 | DF | | Elliot Alain |

=== Management team ===
| Position | Staff |
|---|---|
| Head coach | Julian Pedraza |
| Physical therapist | Luis Rivera |

Source: FC Miami City

=== Year by year ===
| Year | Division | League | Regular season | Playoffs | Open Cup |
|---|---|---|---|---|---|
| 2015 | 4 | USL PDL | 2nd, Southeast | Conference Finals | did not qualify |
| 2016 | 4 | USL PDL | 3rd, Southeast | did not qualify | did not qualify |
| 2017 | 4 | USL PDL | 2nd, Southeast | Conference Finals | did not qualify |
| 2018 | 4 | USL PDL | 5th, Southeast | did not qualify | Play-In Round |
| 2019 | 4 | USL League Two | 5th, Southeast | did not qualify | did not qualify |
| 2020 | 4 | USL League Two | Season cancelled due to COVID-19 pandemic | | |
| 2021 | 4 | USL League Two | 5th, Southeast | did not qualify | did not qualify |
| 2022 | 4 | USL League Two | 3rd, Southeast | did not qualify | did not qualify |
| 2023 | 4 | USL League Two | 3rd, Southeast | did not qualify | did not qualify |
| 2024 | Did not play in national competition | | | | |
| 2025 | 4 | USL League Two | 4th, South Florida | did not qualify | did not qualify |
| 2026 | 4 | USL League Two | 6th, South Florida | did not qualify | did not qualify |

=== Notable players ===
Defenders:

- (France) Hugo Leroux
- (France) Victor Nirennold
- (United States) Jonny Campbell
- (France) Jonathan Parpeix
- (France) Hervé Batoménila

Midfielders:

- (Cameroon) Marcel Mahouvé
- (France) Sidney Govou
- (Puerto Rico) Darren Ríos
- (United States) Bryan Arguez
- (United States) Patrick Lopez

Strikers:

- (United States) David Santamaria

== Women's team ==
=== Current squad (USL W) ===
Note: Flags indicate national team as defined under FIFA eligibility rules; some limited exceptions apply. Players may hold more than one non-FIFA nationality.

| No. | Pos. | Nation | Player |
|---|---|---|---|
| 0 | GK | USA | Denise Mendoza |
| 1 | GK | USA | Paloma Peña |
| 2 | DF | GER | Anna-Lena Stein |
| 3 | DF | USA | Alexa-Renee Garcia |
| 5 | MF | USA | Jocelyn Mendez |
| 6 | FW | USA | Karina Medina |
| 7 | FW | USA | Nicole Solis |
| 8 | MF | ESP | Anna Gomez Vila |
| 9 | FW | USA | Izabella Ruiz |
| 10 | FW | USA | Alejandra Silva |
| 11 | FW | USA | Claudia Caglianone |
| 12 | GK | HAI | Kerly Théus |

| No. | Pos. | Nation | Player |
|---|---|---|---|
| 13 | MF | USA | Amanda Da Silva |
| 14 | MF | USA | Bianca Raskin |
| 15 | DF | USA | Aly Picascio |
| 16 | DF | GER | Sari Oppelland |
| 17 | DF | USA | Jodi Smith |
| 18 | MF | CAN | Claire Monyard |
| 19 | FW | USA | Drew Dempsey |
| 22 | MF | USA | Christine Kindt |
| 23 | MF | USA | Sawyer Hall |
| 27 | MF | DEN | Linea Joergensen |
| 28 | MF | USA | Ariana Munoz |
| 37 | MF | FRA | Prudence Truchot |

=== Management team ===
| Position | Staff |
|---|---|
| Head coach | Rayan Aissani |
| Associate Head coach | Nassim Benazouz |
| Assistant coach | Akpele David |
| Goalkeeper Coach | Ricardo Delgado |

Source: FC Miami City

=== Year by year ===
| Year | Division | League | Regular season | Playoffs |
|---|---|---|---|---|
| 2022 | 4 | USL W League | 1st, Southeast Division | Quarterfinals |
| 2023 | 4 | USL W League | 2nd, Southeast Division | Conference Semifinals |
| 2024 | 4 | USL W League | 4th, Southeast Division | did not qualify |
| 2025 | 4 | USL W League | 6th, Southeast Division | did not qualify |
