= Big South Conference men's soccer tournament =

- Conference soccer championship
- Sport: College soccer
- Conference: Big South Conference
- Number of teams: 6
- Format: Single-elimination
- Current stadium: Eakes Athletics Complex
- Current location: Buies Creek, NC
- Played: 1984–current
- Last contest: 2026
- Current champion: Longwood (1st title)
- Most championships: Coastal Carolina (12 titles)
- TV partner(s): ESPN3, ESPN+
- Official website: bigsouthsports.com/msoc

The Big South Conference men's soccer tournament is a men's college soccer tournament that determines the Big South Conference's automatic berth into the NCAA Division I men's soccer tournament. Held annually since 1984, the tournament is the oldest active NCAA Division I men's college soccer tournament.

With 12 titles, Coastal Carolina has won the most Big South tournaments of all members past and present. Winthrop has the most titles of current Big South Conference members, with five.

== Champions ==
The following is a list of Big South Conference tournament winners:

=== Finals ===
Key

- (1) – Title number
- a.e.t. – Match went to extra time
- p – Match decided by a penalty shootout after extra time
- – Winning team won regular season
- – Winning team won National Championship

=== Year by year ===
| Ed. | Year | Champion | Score | Runner-up | Venue | City | MVP | Ref. |
|---|---|---|---|---|---|---|---|---|
| 1 | 1984 | Campbell (1) | 2–0 | Winthrop | Dedmon Center | Radford, VA | David Nisbet (CAMP) | |
| 2 | 1985 | Campbell (2) | 3–1 | Radford | CCU Soccer Field | Conway, SC | Per Jensen (CAMP) | |
| 3 | 1986 | Coastal Carolina (1) | 1–0 (a.e.t.) | Campbell | Jim Perry Stadium | Buies Creek, NC | Claud Huggins (CCU) | |
| 4 | 1987 | Coastal Carolina (2) | 5–0 | Winthrop | CCU Soccer Field | Conway, SC | Sigurdur Sveinbjornsson (CCU) | |
| 5 | 1988 | Radford (1) | 3–1 | Charleston Southern | Jim Perry Stadium | Buies Creek, NC | Doug Majewski (RU) | |
| 6 | 1989 | Coastal Carolina (3) | 1–0 | Campbell | Greenwood Soccer Field | Asheville, NC | Dean Herritty (CCU) | |
| 7 | 1990 | Coastal Carolina (4) | 2–0 | Davidson | Greenwood Soccer Field | Asheville, NC | Robin Williams (CCU) | |
| 8 | 1991 | Campbell (3) | 4–0 | Winthrop | CCU Soccer Field | Conway, SC | Rami Kauppi (CAMP) | |
| 9 | 1992 | Campbell (4) | 5–0 | UNC Greensboro | Old Eagle Field | Rock Hill, SC | Rami Kauppi (CAMP) | |
| 10 | 1993 | UNC Greensboro (1) | 2–1 | Campbell | UNCG Soccer Stadium | Greensboro, NC | Shawn Mahoney (UNCG) | |
| 11 | 1994 | UNC Greensboro (2) | 3–2 (a.e.t.) | Liberty | UNCG Soccer Stadium | Greensboro, NC | Larry Feniger (UNCG) | |
| 12 | 1995 | Coastal Carolina (5) | 2–0 | UNC Greensboro | CCU Soccer Field | Conway, SC | Neil Payne (CCU) | |
| 13 | 1996 | UNC Greensboro (3) | 2–0 | Radford | UNCG Soccer Stadium | Greensboro, NC | Jeremy Fedor (UNCG) | |
| 14 | 1997 | Charleston Southern | 3–0 | South Alabama | CCU Soccer Field | Conway, SC | Steven Rattray (CSU) | |
| 15 | 1998 | South Alabama | 1–0 | Liberty | Dedmon Center | Radford, VA | Arve Warholm (SAU) | |
| 16 | 1999 | Radford (2) | 0–0 (4–3 p) | Liberty | CCU Soccer Field | Conway, SC | Greg Anderson (RU) | |
| 17 | 2000 | Radford (3) | 2–0 | Elon | Liberty Soccer Field | Lynchburg, VA | Jonathan Frias (RU) | |
| 18 | 2001 | Coastal Carolina (6) | 3–1 | Liberty | Eagle Field | Rock Hill, SC | Tyler Hughes (CCU) | |
| 19 | 2002 | Winthrop (1) | 1–0 | Coastal Carolina | Eagle Field | Rock Hill, SC | Valli Arnason (WU) | |
| 20 | 2003 | Coastal Carolina (7) | 3–0 | Birmingham–Southern | Cupp Memorial Stadium | Radford, VA | Joseph Ngwenya (CCU) | |
| 21 | 2004 | Coastal Carolina (8) | 4–0 | Birmingham–Southern | Berylson Soccer Park | Birmingham, AL | Thabiso Khumalo (CCU) | |
| 22 | 2005 | Coastal Carolina (9) | 1–0 (a.e.t.) | Winthrop | Vert Stadium | High Point, NC | Joseph Kabwe (CCU) | |
| 23 | 2006 | Winthrop (2) | 3–0 | High Point | Cupp Memorial Stadium | Radford, VA | Daniel Revivo (WU) | |
| 24 | 2007 | Liberty (1) | 2–1 | Radford | Eagle Field | Rock Hill, SC | Joshua Boateng (LU) | |
| 25 | 2008 | Winthrop (3) | 4–3 (a.e.t.) | Coastal Carolina | CCU Soccer Field | Conway, SC | Matt Skonicki (WU) | |
| 26 | 2009 | Winthrop (4) | 2–1 | Liberty | Greene–Harbison Stadium | Boiling Springs, NC | Miquel Casajuana (WU) | |
| 27 | 2010 | Coastal Carolina (10) | 3–1 | High Point | Vert Stadium | High Point, NC | Ross Kelly (CCU) | |
| 28 | 2011 | Liberty (2) | 3–1 | Gardner–Webb | Greene–Harbison Stadium | Boiling Springs, NC | Chris Phillips (LU) | |
| 29 | 2012 | Winthrop (5) | 3–2 | Coastal Carolina | Bryan Park | Greensboro, NC | Alex Isern (WU) | |
| 30 | 2013 | Coastal Carolina (11) | 2–0 | Liberty | Bryan Park | Greensboro, NC | Pedro Ribeiro (CCU) | |
| 31 | 2014 | Coastal Carolina (12) | 1–0 | Radford | Bryan Park | Greensboro, NC | Uchenna Uzo (CCU) | |
| 32 | 2015 | Winthrop (6) | 0–0 (4–3 p) | High Point | MacPherson Stadium | Browns Summit, NC | Max Hasenstab (WU) | |
| 33 | 2016 | Radford (4) | 1–0 | Longwood | Cupp Memorial Stadium | Radford, VA | Aitor Pouseu Blanco (RU) | |
| 34 | 2017 | Presbyterian | 0–0 (4–3 p) | High Point | Vert Stadium | High Point, NC | Ricardo Hernandez (PC) | |
| 35 | 2018 | Campbell (5) | 1–0 (a.e.t.) | Presbyterian | Martin Stadium | Clinton, SC | Gideon Betz (CAMP) | |
| 36 | 2019 | Campbell (6) | 4–1 | High Point | Eakes Athletic Complex | Buies Creek, NC | Ian Rees (CAMP) | |
| 37 | 2020–21 | High Point | 3–1 | USC Upstate | Vert Stadium | High Point, NC | Nick Phipps (HP) | |
| 38 | 2021 | Campbell (7) | 3–2 | High Point | Eakes Athletic Complex | Buies Creek, NC | George Bediko (CAMP) | |
| 39 | 2022 | High Point (2) | 2–0 | Campbell | Eakes Athletic Complex | Buies Creek, NC | Noah Holmes (HP) | |
| 40 | 2023 | High Point (3) | 1–1 (4–3 p) | UNC Asheville | Vert Stadium | High Point, NC | Seth Antwi (HP) | |
| 41 | 2024 | Gardner–Webb (1) | 2–1 | High Point | Vert Stadium | High Point, NC | Aden O’Hara (GW) | |
| 42 | 2025 | High Point (4) | 3–0 | Gardner–Webb | Vert Stadium | High Point, NC | Daniel Lugo (HP) | |
| 43 | 2026 | Longwood (1) | 2–1 (a.e.t.) | Gardner–Webb | Greene–Harbison Stadium | Boiling Springs, NC | Brando Bedolla (LONG) | |

== Statistics ==
=== All-time champions ===
Key

- Teams in italic no longer member of the Big South.
- ^{1} no longer sponsor men's soccer.

| College | Titles | Last won | Runn. | Last lost |
|---|---|---|---|---|
| Coastal Carolina | 12 | 2014 | 3 | 2012 |
| Campbell | 7 | 2021 | 4 | 2022 |
| Winthrop | 6 | 2015 | 4 | 2005 |
| High Point | 4 | 2025 | 7 | 2024 |
| Radford | 4 | 2016 | 4 | 2014 |
| UNC Greensboro | 3 | 1996 | 2 | 1995 |
| Liberty | 2 | 2011 | 6 | 2013 |
| Gardner–Webb | 1 | 2024 | 3 | 2026 |
| Charleston Southern^{1} | 1 | 1997 | 1 | 1988 |
| Longwood | 1 | 2026 | 1 | 2016 |
| Presbyterian | 1 | 2017 | 1 | 2018 |
| South Alabama^{1} | 1 | 1998 | 1 | 1997 |
| Birmingham–Southern | 0 | —N/a | 2 | 2004 |
| Davidson | 0 | —N/a | 1 | 1990 |
| Elon | 0 | —N/a | 1 | 2000 |
| UNC Asheville | 0 | —N/a | 1 | 2023 |
| USC Upstate | 0 | —N/a | 1 | 2020–21 |
