= 2016 Big South Conference men's soccer season =

- League: NCAA Division I
- Sport: Soccer
- Duration: August, 2016 – November, 2016
- Teams: 10

2017 MLS SuperDraft
- Top draft pick: Jo Vetle Rimstad, Radford
- Picked by: D.C. United, 43rd overall

Regular season
- Season champions: Radford
- Runners-up: High Point
- Season MVP: Offense: Tresor Mbuyu; Jo Vetle Rimstad

Tournament
- Champions: Radford

Big South Conference men's soccer seasons
- ← 2015 2017 →

2016 Big South Conference men's soccer standings
	Conf.					Overall
Team	W		L		T	W		L		T
Radford ‡	7	–	1	–	0	14	–	4	–	2
High Point	5	–	1	–	2	11	–	4	–	4
UNC Asheville	5	–	3	–	0	6	–	13	–	0
Liberty	4	–	3	–	1	7	–	9	–	2
Presbyterian	4	–	4	–	0	7	–	10	–	3
Longwood	3	–	5	–	0	8	–	12	–	1
Gardner–Webb	2	–	5	–	1	4	–	11	–	1
Winthrop	2	–	6	–	0	5	–	10	–	2
Campbell	2	–	6	–	0	5	–	11	–	1
‡-Tournament champion +- Invited to the NCAA Division I Men's Soccer Championship; As of 18 November 2016; Rankings from NSCAA

The 2016 Big South Conference men's soccer season was the 33rd season of men's varsity soccer in the conference.

The Winthrop Eagles are both the defending regular season and conference tournament champions.

== Changes from 2015 ==
- The Coastal Carolina Chanticleers are leaving the conference to join the Sun Belt Conference.

== Teams ==
=== Stadiums and locations ===
Team	Location	Stadium	Capacity
Campbell Fighting Camels	Indianapolis, Indiana	Eakes Athletic Complex	1,000
Gardner–Webb Runnin' Bulldogs	Boiling Springs, North Carolina	Greene-Harbison Soccer Stadium	800
High Point Panthers	High Point, North Carolina	Vert Stadium	1,100
Liberty Flames	Lynchburg, Virginia	Liberty Soccer Stadium	2,000
Longwood Lancers	Farmville, Virginia	Longwood Athletics Complex	350
Presbyterian Blue Hose	Clinton, South Carolina	Martin Stadium	400
Radford Highlanders	Radford, Virginia	Cupp Memorial Stadium	5,000
UNC Asheville Bulldogs	Asheville, North Carolina	Greenwood Soccer Field	1,000
VMI Keydets	Lexington, Virginia	Patchin Field	1,000
Winthrop Eagles	Rock Hill, South Carolina	Eagle Field	1,500

== Regular season ==
=== Results ===
As of October 9, 2016

Legend
Home team win
Home team defeat
Draw/tie
Postponed

Home/Away	CAM	GW	HPU	LIB	LON	PRE	RAD	UNA	WIN
Campbell Fighting Camels			11/02			10/22		2–1	4–1
Gardner–Webb Runnin' Bulldogs	2–1			10/21		11/02	0–1		
High Point Panthers		10/29			3–0		10/22	10/15	
Liberty Flames	10/14		10/26			10/29		3–4	
Longwood Lancers	6–2	P		11/02			10/26		
Presbyterian Blue Hose			2–1		10/15			10/26	3–1
Radford Highlanders	10/29			2–1		1–0			10/15
UNC Asheville Bulldogs		1–0			3–2		11/02		10/22
Winthrop Eagles		10/26	10/19	3–4	10/29				

=== Rankings ===
Legend
Increase in ranking
Decrease in ranking
Not ranked previous week

		Pre	Wk 1	Wk 2	Wk 3	Wk 4	Wk 5	Wk 6	Wk 7	Wk 8	Wk 9	Wk 10	Wk 11	Wk 12	Final
Campbell	C														
Gardner–Webb	C														
High Point	C									RV	NR				
Liberty	C														
Longwood	C														
Presbyterian	C														
Radford	C	RV	20	18	24	20	RV	RV	RV	25	RV	RV	RV	RV	RV
UNC Asheville	C														
VMI	C														
Winthrop	C														

== Postseason ==
=== Big South Tournament ===
Tournament details to be announced.

=== NCAA tournament ===
Seed	Region	School	1st round	2nd round	3rd round	Quarterfinals	Semifinals	Championship
—	4	Radford	L, 1–2 vs. Coastal Carolina – (Conway)					

== All-Big South awards and teams ==
2016 Big South Men's Soccer Individual Awards
Award	Recipient(s)
Attacking Player of the Year	Tresor Mbuyu, F, Soph., Liberty
Defensive Player of the Year	Jo Vetle Rimstad, D, Sr., Radford
Coach of the Year	Marc Reeves, Radford
Freshman of the Year	Siggi Benonysson, F, Fr., High Point

2016 Big South Men's Soccer All-Conference Teams
First Team	Second Team	Rookie Team
F: Siggi Benonysson, Fr., High Point; F: Chris Ramsell, Sr., High Point; F: Tresor Mbuyu, Soph., Liberty; MF: Ali Al-Gashamy, Sr., Gardner-Webb; MF: Renato Punyed, Sr., High Point; MF: Kevin Mendoza, Soph., Liberty; MF: Finnlay Wyatt, Sr., Longwood; D: Jo Vetle Rimstad, Sr., Radford; D: Johnny Fenwick, Soph., High Point; D: Fraser Colmer, Jr., Radford; D: Bismark Amofah, Sr., Radford; GK: Aitor Pousea Blanco, R-Jr., Radford; AL: Kyle Carr, D, Sr., Liberty	F: Mason Lewis, Sr., Presbyterian; F: Zach Joens, Sr., UNC Asheville; F: Evan Szklennik, Sr., Radford; MF: Bana Ganidekam, Fr., High Point; MF: Dan Campos, Jr., Longwood; MF: Jakob Strandsäter, Soph., Radford; MF: Kieran Roberts, R-Soph., Radford; D: Zack Compton, Jr., UNC Asheville; D: Edward Fulwood, Fr., Campbell; D: Daniel Mukuna, Soph., Campbell; D: Rashid Tetteh, Soph., High Point; GK: Carlos Canas, Sr., Longwood; AL: Cade Crow, MF, Sr., Presbyterian	Siggi Benonysson, F, Fr., High Point; Bana Ganidekam, MF, Fr., High Point; Max Poelker, F, Fr., Longwood; Gideon Betz, MF, Fr., Campbell; Edward Fulwood, D, Fr., Campbell; Rigo Rojas, F, Fr., Liberty; Victor Valls, MF, Fr., Radford; Sergio Pinto, MF, Fr., Presbyterian; Severin Soerlie, F, Fr., Gardner-Webb; James Knoebel, GK, R-Fr., Liberty; Francesco Tiozzo, D, Fr., Winthrop

== See also ==
- 2016 NCAA Division I men's soccer season
- 2016 Big South Conference Men's Soccer Tournament
