= 2020 Big South Conference men's soccer season =

- League: NCAA Division I
- Sport: Soccer
- Duration: February 21 – April 8, 2021
- Teams: 10

2021 MLS SuperDraft

Regular Season

Tournament

Big South Conference men's soccer seasons
- ← 2019 2021 →

2020 Big South Conference men's soccer standings
	Conf.					Overall
Team	W		L		T	W		L		T
No. 23 High Point ‡	8	–	0	–	0	12	–	2	–	0
USC Upstate	6	–	1	–	1	6	–	4	–	2
Campbell	5	–	1	–	1	8	–	2	–	2
UNC Asheville	3	–	4	–	1	3	–	5	–	1
Gardner–Webb	3	–	5	–	0	5	–	6	–	0
Presbyterian	2	–	4	–	2	4	–	4	–	2
Radford	2	–	4	–	1	3	–	5	–	1
Longwood	1	–	5	–	1	2	–	6	–	1
Winthrop	0	–	7	–	1	0	–	8	–	1
‡ – 2020 Big South Tournament champion + – Also invited to the 2020 NCAA tournament; As of May 28, 2021; Rankings from United Soccer Coaches

The 2020 Big South Conference men's soccer season was the 37th edition of Big South Conference men's varsity soccer. The season began on February 21 and concluded on April 8, 2021.

The season was originally scheduled to be played from August 28 to November 6, 2020, but was postponed due to the COVID-19 pandemic.

== Background ==
=== Impact of the COVID-19 pandemic on the season ===
The COVID-19 pandemic widely disrupted all sporting activities across the NCAA, including men's soccer. Prior to the pandemic, the regular season was scheduled to begin on August 30, 2020 and conclude on November 6, 2020 culminating with the Big South Tournament in mid-November and the NCAA Tournament in late November into mid-December.

On July 22, 2020, the conference announced plans to begin the season during the fall 2020 semester, with a September 3 start date. On August 12, 2020, the conference reversed its decision, cancelling fall sporting activities, and targeting a spring 2021 semester start for all fall sports.

Details around the spring 2021 season became known on November 5, 2020 when the Big South Conference announced the schedule for the spring of 2021. Teams would play an eight-match conference schedule starting on February 21, 2021. Teams are permitted to schedule three non-conference matches, starting no earlier than February 14, 2021. The final game of the regular season was scheduled for April 8, 2021.

The tournament was reduced to four teams and will begin on April 12, 2021 and conclude on April 18, 2021.

== Teams ==
=== Stadiums and locations ===
Team	Location	Stadium	Capacity
Campbell Fighting Camels	Indianapolis, Indiana	Eakes Athletic Complex	1,000
Gardner–Webb Runnin' Bulldogs	Boiling Springs, North Carolina	Greene-Harbison Soccer Stadium	800
High Point Panthers	High Point, North Carolina	Vert Stadium	1,100
Longwood Lancers	Farmville, Virginia	Longwood Athletics Complex	350
Presbyterian Blue Hose	Clinton, South Carolina	Martin Stadium	400
Radford Highlanders	Radford, Virginia	Cupp Memorial Stadium	5,000
UNC Asheville Bulldogs	Asheville, North Carolina	Greenwood Soccer Field	1,000
USC Upstate Spartans	Spartanburg, South Carolina	County University Soccer Stadium	3,000
Winthrop Eagles	Rock Hill, South Carolina	Eagle Field	1,500

== Head coaches ==
As of the 2019 season

Team	Head coach	Previous job	Years at school	Overall record	Record at school	BSC record	NCAA Tournaments	NCAA College Cups	NCAA Titles	Ref.
Campbell	Dustin Fonder	High Point	6	128–102–26 (.551)	50–39–8 (.557)	63–34–12 (.633)	2	0	0	
Gardner–Webb			0	0–0–0 (–)	0–0–0 (–)	0–0–0 (–)	0	0	0	
High Point	Zach Haines	Denver (asst.)	2	13–7–0 (.650)	13–7–0 (.650)	7–1–0 (.875)	0	0	0	
Longwood			0	0–0–0 (–)	0–0–0 (–)	0–0–0 (–)	0	0	0	
Presbyterian			0	0–0–0 (–)	0–0–0 (–)	0–0–0 (–)	0	0	0	
Radford			0	0–0–0 (–)	0–0–0 (–)	0–0–0 (–)	0	0	0	
UNC Asheville			0	0–0–0 (–)	0–0–0 (–)	0–0–0 (–)	0	0	0	
USC Upstate	Scott Halkett	USC Upstate (asst.)	4	0–0–0 (–)	0–0–0 (–)	0–0–0 (–)	0	0	0	
Winthrop	Daniel Ridenhour	Winthrop (asst.)	5	17–44–5 (.295)	17–44–5 (.295)	9–17–3 (.362)	0	0	0	

== Preseason ==
=== Preseason poll ===
The preseason poll was released on January 28, 2021.

	Team ranking	Points	First place votes
1.	Campbell	76	6
2.	High Point	70	1
3.	Gardner–Webb	53	1
4.	Presbyterian	50	0
5.	USC Upstate	41	0
6.	Longwood	36	1
7.	Winthrop	34	0
8.	Radford	28	0
9.	UNC Asheville	17	0

=== Preseason national polls ===
The preseason national rankings are normally announced in August. United Soccer Coaches, Soccer America, and TopDrawerSoccer.com delayed their Top-25 preseason poll to the start of the spring season. CollegeSoccerNews.com did a Top-30 preseason poll in September 2020. TopDrawer Soccer, Soccer America, and United Soccer Coaches released their rankings in February 2021.

	United; Soccer	CSN	Soccer; America	TopDrawer; Soccer
Campbell	—	—	—	—
Gardner–Webb	—	—	—	—
High Point	—	—	—	RV
Longwood	—	—	—	—
Presbyterian	—	—	—	—
Radford	—	—	—	—
UNC Asheville	—	—	—	—
USC Upstate	—	—	—	—
Winthrop	—	—	—	—

=== Preseason honors ===
- Preseason Offensive Player of the Year – Matt Lock, Campbell
- Preseason Defensive Player of the Year – Luca Ziegler, Presbyterian

== Regular season ==
=== Weekly results ===
Legend

Index to colors and formatting
BSC member won
BSC member lost
BSC member tied
BSC teams in **bold**

All times Eastern time.

==== Week 1 (Feb. 3 – Feb. 7) ====
No Big South Teams scheduled matches during Week 1.

==== Week 2 (Feb. 8 – Feb. 14) ====
Date	Time (ET)	Visiting team	Home team	Site	Result	Attendance
February 14	2:00 p.m.	**Winthrop**	South Carolina	Stone Stadium • Columbia, SC	2-4	167
February 14	2:00 p.m.	**Gardner–Webb**	VMI	Patchin Field • Lexington, VA	5-0	0
February 14	3:00 p.m.	**Longwood**	Liberty	Liberty Soccer Stadium • Lynchburg, VA	**Postponed**	
February 14	3:00 p.m.	**USC Upstate**	Wofford	Snyder Field • Spartanburg, SC	**Postponed**	
February 14	4:00 p.m.	Shaw University	**Campbell**	Eakes Athletics Complex • Buies Creek, NC	0-2	25
February 14	4:00 p.m.	Lees–McRae	**High Point**	Vert Stadium • High Point, NC	0-5	0

==== Week 3 (Feb. 15 – Feb. 21) ====
Date	Time (ET)	Visiting team	Home team	Site	Result	Attendance
February 17	3:00 p.m.	Wofford	**Winthrop**	Eagle Field • Rock Hill, SC	**Cancelled**	
February 17	5:00 p.m.	**Radford**	Liberty	Liberty Soccer Stadium • Lynchburg, VA	0-4	250
February 17	6:00 p.m.	VCU	**Longwood**	Longwood Athletics Complex • Farmville, VA	**Postponed**	
February 17	7:00 p.m.	**USC Upstate**	South Carolina	Stone Stadium • Columbia, SC	1-2 (OT)	210
February 21	1:00 p.m.	**Longwood**	**UNC Asheville**	Greenwood Soccer Field • Asheville, NC	1-2	1
February 21	3:30 p.m.	**Radford**	**USC Upstate**	County University Soccer Stadium • Spartanburg, SC	1-2	155
February 21	4:00 p.m.	**Gardner–Webb**	**High Point**	Vert Stadium • High Point, NC	0-4	0

==== Week 4 (Feb. 22 – Feb. 28) ====
Date	Time (ET)	Visiting team	Home team	Site	Result	Attendance
February 22	7:00 p.m.	**Winthrop**	Campbell	Eakes Athletics Complex • Buies Creek, NC	0-6	60
February 24	6:00 p.m.	UNC Greensboro	Gardner–Webb	Greene-Harbison Stadium • Shelby, NC		
February 24	7:00 p.m.	Furman	USC Upstate	County University Soccer Stadium • Spartanburg, SC		
February 25	7:00 p.m.	Davidson	High Point	Vert Stadium • High Point, NC		
February 28	1:30 p.m.	**Longwood**	Presbyterian	Martin Stadium • Clinton, SC		
February 28	2:00 p.m.	**Campbell**	USC Upstate	County University Soccer Stadium • Spartanburg, SC		
February 28	2:00 p.m.	**Winthrop**	UNC Asheville	Greenwood Soccer Field • Asheville, NC		
February 28	4:00 p.m.	**Radford**	Gardner–Webb	Greene-Harbison Stadium • Shelby, NC		

==== Week 5 (Mar. 1 – Mar. 7) ====
Date	Time (ET)	Visiting team	Home team	Site	Result	Attendance
March 1	7:00 p.m.	**High Point**	Liberty	Liberty Soccer Stadium • Lynchburg, VA		
March 2	6:00 p.m.	Furman	**Gardner–Webb**	Greene-Harbison Stadium • Shelby, NC		
March 3	6:00 p.m.	**Campbell**	UNC Wilmington	UNCW Soccer Stadium • Wilmington, NC		
March 3	7:00 p.m.	**Presbyterian**	**USC Upstate**	County University Soccer Stadium • Spartanburg, SC		
March 4	7:00 p.m.	VMI	**Radford**	Cupp Stadium • Radford, VA		
March 7	2:00 p.m.	**Gardner–Webb**	**Longwood**	Longwood Athletics Complex • Farmville, VA		
March 7	2:00 p.m.	**High Point**	**Presbyterian**	Martin Stadium • Clinton, SC		
March 7	3:00 p.m.	**USC Upstate**	**Winthrop**	Eagle Field • Rock Hill, SC		
March 7	6:00 p.m.	**UNC Asheville**	**Campbell**	Eakes Athletics Complex • Buies Creek, NC		

==== Week 6 (Mar. 8 – Mar. 14) ====
Date	Time (ET)	Visiting team	Home team	Site	Result	Attendance
March 10	4:00 p.m.	Longwood	VMI	Patchin Field • Lexington, VA		
March 11	4:00 p.m.	UNC Asheville	**Radford**	Cupp Stadium • Radford, VA		
March 13	6:00 p.m.	High Point	**Campbell**	Eakes Athletics Complex • Buies Creek, NC		
March 14	2:00 p.m.	USC Upstate	**Longwood**	Longwood Athletics Complex • Farmville, VA		
March 14	2:00 p.m.	Winthrop	**Radford**	Cupp Memorial Stadium • Radford, VA		
March 14	3:00 p.m.	Presbyterian	**Gardner–Webb**	Greene-Harbison Stadium • Boiling Springs, NC		

==== Week 7 (Mar. 15 – Mar. 21) ====
Date	Time (ET)	Visiting team	Home team	Site	Result	Attendance
March 17	7:00 p.m.	**High Point**	**Winthrop**	Eagle Field • Rock Hill, SC		
March 20	6:00 p.m.	**Presbyterian**	**Campbell**	Eakes Athletics Complex • Buies Creek, NC		
March 21	3:00 p.m.	**USC Upstate**	**UNC Asheville**	Greenwood Soccer Field • Asheville, NC		
March 21	6:00 p.m.	**Gardner–Webb**	**Winthrop**	Eagle Field • Rock Hill, SC		
March 22	7:00 p.m.	**Radford**	**High Point**	Vert Stadium • High Point, NC		

==== Week 8 (Mar. 22 – Mar. 28) ====
Date	Time (ET)	Visiting team	Home team	Site	Result	Attendance
March 24	6:00 p.m.	**Campbell**	Longwood	Longwood Athletics Complex • Farmville, VA		
March 27	5:00 p.m.	**High Point**	USC Upstate	County University Soccer Stadium • Spartanburg, SC		
March 28	6:00 p.m.	**Longwood**	Winthrop	Eagle Field • Rock Hill, SC		
March 28	6:00 p.m.	Elon	Campbell	Eakes Athletics Complex • Buies Creek, NC		
March 28	2:00 p.m.	**Gardner–Webb**	UNC Asheville	Greenwood Soccer Field • Asheville, NC		
March 28	4:00 p.m.	**Presbyterian**	Radford	Cupp Memorial Stadium • Radford, VA		

==== Week 9 (Mar. 29 – Apr. 4) ====
Date	Time (ET)	Visiting team	Home team	Site	Result	Attendance
April 2	7:00 p.m.	**Winthrop**	Furman	Eugene E. Stone III Stadium • Greenville, SC		
April 3	4:00 p.m.	**USC Upstate**	**Gardner–Webb**	Greene-Harbison Stadium • Boiling Springs, NC		
April 3	7:00 p.m.	**Longwood**	**High Point**	Vert Stadium • High Point, NC		
April 3	7:00 p.m.	**UNC Asheville**	**Presbyterian**	Martin Stadium • Clinton, SC		
April 3	1:00 p.m.	**Campbell**	**Radford**	Cupp Memorial Stadium • Radford, VA		

==== Week 10 (Apr. 5 – Apr. 11) ====
Date	Time (ET)	Visiting team	Home team	Site	Result	Attendance
April 8	4:00 p.m.	**Winthrop**	**Presbyterian**	Martin Stadium • Clinton, SC		
April 8	4:00 p.m.	**Campbell**	**Gardner–Webb**	Greene-Harbison Stadium • Boiling Springs, NC		
April 8	6:00 p.m.	**Radford**	**Longwood**	Longwood Athletics Complex • Farmville, VA		
April 8	7:00 p.m.	**UNC Asheville**	**High Point**	Vert Stadium • High Point, NC		

== Postseason ==
=== Big South Tournament ===
The top four teams will qualify for the tournament. The tournament will be played April 12–18.

Semifinals; April 12
1
4
2
3

Championship; April 18

=== NCAA Tournament ===
The Big South Tournament winner will qualify for the NCAA Tournament. Other teams can still earn an at-large bid into the tournament.

=== Postseason awards and honors ===
2020 Big South Men's Soccer Individual Awards
Award	Recipient(s)
Attacking Player of the Year	
Defensive Player of the Year	
Coach of the Year	
Freshman of the Year	

2020 Big South Men's Soccer All-Conference Teams
First Team	Second Team	Rookie Team

== MLS SuperDraft ==
The 2021 MLS SuperDraft was held in January 2021.

=== Total picks by school ===
Team	Round 1	Round 2	Round 3	Round 4	Total
Campbell			1		
Total	0	0	1	0	0

=== List of selections ===
Round	Pick #	MLS team	Player	Position	College
3	75	FC Dallas	(France) Thibaut Jacquel	DF	Campbell

=== Notable undrafted players ===
The following players went pro after the 2020 season despite not getting drafted in the 2021 MLS draft.

Player	Nationality	Position	College	Team	League
