= 2013 Big South Conference men's soccer season =

Big South Conference
- Season: 2013
- Champions: TBD
- Premiers: TBD
- NCAA Tournament: TBD

The 2013 Big South Conference men's soccer season will be the 30th season of men's varsity soccer in the conference. It will be the final Big South season for VMI, which will return to the Southern Conference in July 2014.

The defending regular season champions are the Coastal Carolina Chanticleers, while the defending tournament champions are the Winthrop Eagles.

== Changes from 2012 ==
No schools entered or left the Big South Conference after the 2012 season, nor did any member school begin or drop men's soccer.

== Teams ==
=== Stadia and locations ===
Team	Location	Stadium	Capacity
Campbell Fighting Camels	Indianapolis, Indiana	Eakes Athletic Complex	1,000
Coastal Carolina Chanticleers	Conway, South Carolina	CCU Soccer Field	1,000
Gardner–Webb Runnin' Bulldogs	Boiling Springs, North Carolina	Greene-Harbison Soccer Stadium	800
High Point Panthers	High Point, North Carolina	Vert Stadium	1,100
Liberty Flames	Lynchburg, Virginia	Liberty Soccer Stadium	2,000
Longwood Lancers	Farmville, Virginia	Longwood Athletics Complex	350
Presbyterian Blue Hose	Clinton, South Carolina	Martin Stadium	400
Radford Highlanders	Radford, Virginia	Cupp Memorial Stadium	5,000
UNC Asheville Bulldogs	Asheville, North Carolina	Greenwood Soccer Field	1,000
VMI Keydets	Lexington, Virginia	Patchin Field	1,000
Winthrop Eagles	Rock Hill, South Carolina	Eagle Field	1,500

== Standings ==
2013 Big South men's soccer standings
	Conf.					Overall
Team	W		L		T	W		L		T
No. 15 Coastal Carolina ‡	9	–	1	–	0	19	–	5	–	0
High Point	6	–	2	–	2	8	–	8	–	3
Longwood	6	–	3	–	1	7	–	9	–	4
Gardner–Webb	6	–	4	–	0	9	–	8	–	1
Radford	5	–	3	–	2	9	–	7	–	4
Campbell	5	–	4	–	1	5	–	10	–	4
Winthrop	5	–	5	–	0	11	–	7	–	1
Liberty	5	–	5	–	0	11	–	9	–	0
UNC Asheville	2	–	8	–	0	5	–	14	–	0
VMI	2	–	8	–	0	3	–	14	–	1
Presbyterian	1	–	9	–	0	3	–	15	–	0
‡ - Tournament champion + - Invited to the NCAA Division I Men's Soccer Championship; As of December 17, 2013; Rankings from NSCAA

== Results ==
Home/Away	CAM	CCU	GW	HPU	LIB	LON	PRE	RAD	UNA	VMI	WIN
Campbell Fighting Camels											
Coastal Carolina Chanticleers											
Gardner–Webb Runnin' Bulldogs											
High Point Panthers											
Liberty Flames											
Longwood Lancers											
Presbyterian Blue Hose											
Radford Highlanders											
UNC Asheville Bulldogs											
VMI Keydets											
Winthrop Eagles											
