= 2013 Big South Conference men's soccer tournament =

2013 Big South men's soccer tournament
Tournament details
- Country: United States
- Teams: 8

Final positions
- Champions: Coastal Carolina
- Runners-up: Liberty

Tournament statistics
- Matches played: 7

The 2013 Big South Conference men's soccer tournament will be the 30th edition of the tournament. Held from Nov. 14-17, it will determine the Big South Conference champion, and the automatic berth into the 2013 NCAA Division I Men's Soccer Championship. The Winthrop Eagles are the defending men's soccer champions.

== Qualification ==
2013 Big South men's soccer standings
	Conf.					Overall
Team	W		L		T	W		L		T
No. 15 Coastal Carolina ‡	9	–	1	–	0	19	–	5	–	0
High Point	6	–	2	–	2	8	–	8	–	3
Longwood	6	–	3	–	1	7	–	9	–	4
Gardner–Webb	6	–	4	–	0	9	–	8	–	1
Radford	5	–	3	–	2	9	–	7	–	4
Campbell	5	–	4	–	1	5	–	10	–	4
Winthrop	5	–	5	–	0	11	–	7	–	1
Liberty	5	–	5	–	0	11	–	9	–	0
UNC Asheville	2	–	8	–	0	5	–	14	–	0
VMI	2	–	8	–	0	3	–	14	–	1
Presbyterian	1	–	9	–	0	3	–	15	–	0
‡ - Tournament champion + - Invited to the NCAA Division I Men's Soccer Championship; As of December 17, 2013; Rankings from NSCAA

== Bracket ==
Quarterfinals
1	Coastal Carolina	2
8	Winthrop	1
4	Gardner–Webb	1
5	Radford (OT)	2
2	High Point	0
7	Liberty	1
3	Longwood (pen.)	2 (4)
6	Campbell	2 (1)

Semifinals
1	Coastal Carolina
5	Radford
7	Liberty
3	Longwood

Championship

== Schedule ==
=== Quarterfinals ===
November 12, 2013	#4 Gardner–Webb	1–2 (a.e.t.)	#5 Radford	Boiling Springs, North Carolina
18:00 EDT	Wells (yellow card) 23' (yellow-red card) 62'; Mafi 28'; Comvalius (yellow card) 50'; Mafi (yellow card) 69'	Report	Redondo (yellow card) 37'; O'Keefe (yellow card) 53'; Arzubiaga 70'; Ulmo 98'	Stadium: Greene–Harbison Stadium; Attendance: 239; Referee: Rob Mann

November 12, 2013	#1 Coastal Carolina	2–1	#8 Winthrop	Conway, South Carolina
18:00 EDT	Carmargo 27', 61'	Report	Kennedy 24'; Obougou (yellow card) 35'; Lluch (yellow card) 66'; Sole (yellow card) 76'	Stadium: CCU Soccer Field; Attendance: 345; Referee: Carmen Serbio

November 12, 2013	#2 High Point	0–1	#7 Liberty	High Point, North Carolina
20:00 EDT	Foster (yellow card) 57'; Mugunku (yellow card) 87'	Report	Wilson 21' (yellow card) 53'; Harbison (yellow card) 40'	Stadium: Vert Stadium; Attendance: 316; Referee: Christopher Spivey

November 12, 2013	#3 Longwood	2–2 (a.e.t.) (4–1 p)	#6 Campbell	Farmville, Virginia
18:00 EDT	Ugorji 63' (yellow card) 68'; Keilty 70'; Cairns (yellow card) 88'; Yardley (yellow card) 107'; Cañas (yellow card) 110'	Report	Rodriguez (yellow card) 21'; Moore 29'; Francis 79'	Stadium: Longwood Athletics Complex; Attendance: 153; Referee: Saeed Mohamed
	Penalties
	Yardley (penalty scored); Durr (penalty scored); Fowler (penalty scored); Cairns (penalty scored)		(penalty scored) Franz; (penalty missed) Mulvey; (penalty missed) Golden

=== Semifinals ===
November 15, 2012	#1 Coastal Carolina	v	#5 Radford	Greensboro, North Carolina
16:00 ET				Stadium: Macpherson Stadium

November 15, 2012	#3 Longwood	v	#7 Liberty	Greensboro, North Carolina
19:00 ET				Stadium: Macpherson Stadium

=== Big South Championship ===
November 17, 2012	v	Greensboro, North Carolina
19:00 ET		Stadium: Macpherson Stadium

== See also ==
- Big South Conference
- 2013 Big South Conference men's soccer season
- 2013 NCAA Division I men's soccer season
- 2013 NCAA Division I Men's Soccer Championship
