= 2018 High Point Panthers men's soccer team =

American college soccer season

2018 High Point Panthers men's soccer

Big South Regular Season Champions

NCAA Tournament, First Round
- Conference: Big South Conference
- U. Soc. Coaches poll: No. 32
- Record: 13–2–1 (7–0–1 Big South)
- Head coach: EJ O'Keeffe (4th season)
- Assistant coaches: Josh Gillon (5th season); Travis Morris (2nd season); Erik Casterline (1st season)
- Home stadium: Vert Stadium

2018 Big South Conference men's soccer standings
	Conf.					Overall
Team	W		L		T	W		L		T
High Point +	7	–	0	–	1	13	–	3	–	2
Radford	5	–	3	–	0	7	–	9	–	0
Presbyterian	5	–	3	–	0	8	–	12	–	0
Campbell ‡	4	–	3	–	1	9	–	9	–	3
Gardner–Webb	4	–	4	–	0	4	–	11	–	1
Longwood	3	–	4	–	1	5	–	13	–	1
USC Upstate	3	–	4	–	1	3	–	12	–	1
Winthrop	3	–	5	–	0	4	–	11	–	0
UNC Asheville	0	–	8	–	0	2	–	13	–	2
‡ – 2018 Big South Tournament champion + – Invited to the 2018 NCAA Division I Men's Soccer Championship; As of November 29, 2018; Rankings from United Soccer Coaches

The 2018 High Point Panthers men's soccer team represented High Point University during the 2018 NCAA Division I men's soccer season. It was the 61st season of the university fielding a program.

== Squad ==
=== Roster ===
Updated October 28, 2018

Note: Flags indicate national team as defined under FIFA eligibility rules; some limited exceptions apply. Players may hold more than one non-FIFA nationality.

No.	Pos.	Nation	Player
0	GK	USA	Pat Fallon
00	GK	USA	Scott Weigel
1	GK	USA	Keegan Meyer
2	DF	USA	Seth DePriest-Kessler
3	MF	USA	Alex Abril
4	MF	ENG	Ryan Inman
5	DF	ENG	Johnny Fenwick
6	MF	ENG	Josh Baker
7	FW	GRE	Ilias Kosmidis
8			Lalas Ayertey
9	FW	ISL	Siggi Benonysson
10	MF	GHA	Bana Ganidekam
11	MF	USA	Jonathan Bolanos
12	DF	GHA	Rashid Tetteh
13	FW	USA	Tanner Binion
14	MF	USA	Tony Pineda

No.	Pos.	Nation	Player
15	DF	USA	Hunter Allen
16	MF	USA	George Ekdahl
17	DF	USA	Ethan Harvey
18	MF	USA	Dylan Bradley
19	MF	USA	Ihson Nassiri
20	FW	USA	Jacob Frank
21	MF	USA	Dano Deger
22	DF	USA	Nick Phipps
23	DF	USA	Daniel Shahim
24	FW	BRA	Jaime Vasconcellos
26	DF	USA	Daniel McClintock
28	DF	USA	Ryeong Choi
29	DF	USA	Alec Prieto
30	DF	USA	Josh Dubost
37	FW	USA	Gunnar Siegel
38	DF	USA	Holden Trent

== Schedule ==
Date Time, TV	Rank^{#}	Opponent^{#}	Result	Record	Site (Attendance) City, State
Regular season
August 24*		at Wofford	W 2–0	1–0–0	Snyder Field (117); Spartanburg, NC
August 27*		at Davidson	W 2–1	2–0–0	Alumni Soccer Stadium (784); Davidson, NC
August 31*		at ETSU	W 3–2 ^{2OT}	3–0–0	Summers-Taylor Stadium (730); Johnson City, TN
September 4*		at UNC Greensboro	W 3–2	4–0–0	UNCG Soccer Stadium (730); Greensboro, NC
September 8*		Elon	L 1–2	4–1–0	Vert Stadium (1,023); High Point, NC
September 18		at USC Upstate	W 4–1	5–1–0 (1–0–0)	County University Soccer Stadium (75); Spartanburg, SC
September 22		Gardner–Webb	W 1-0	6–1–0 (2–0–0)	Vert Stadium (1,208); High Point, NC
September 25*		Appalachian State	W 2–0	7–1–0	Vert Stadium (732); High Point, NC
September 29		Winthrop	W 1–0	8–1–0 (3–0–0)	Eagle Field (212); Rock Hill, SC
October 3		UNC Asheville	W 2–1 ^{2OT}	9–1–0 (4–0–0)	Vert Stadium (808); High Point, NC
October 6		Longwood	W 2–1 ^{2OT}	10–1–0 (5–0–0)	Vert Stadium (508); High Point, NC
October 9*		at No. 2 Wake Forest	L 2–4	10–2–0	Spry Stadium (1,783); Winston-Salem, NC
October 16*		at No. 14 Duke	W 1–0	11–2–0	Koskinen Stadium (493); Durham, NC
October 24	No. 25	Campbell	T 1–1 ^{2OT}	11–2–1 (5–0–1)	Eakes Athletic Complex (463); Buies Creek, NC
October 27	No. 25	Radford	W 2–1	12–2–1 (6–0–1)	Vert Stadium (1,100); High Point, NC
October 31	No. 20	Presbyterian	W 1–0	13–2–1 (7–0–1)	Edens Field (134); Clinton, SC
Big South Tournament
November 7	(1) No. 20	(4) Campbell; Semifinals	T 0–0; L 2–4 (p)	13–2–2	Vert Stadium (795); High Point, NC
NCAA Tournament
11/15/2018*; 7:00 pm	No. 16	No. 25 James Madison; First Round	L 0–3	13–3–2	Vert Stadium (757); High Point, NC
*Non-conference game. ^{#}Rankings from United Soccer Coaches. (#) Tournament seedings in parentheses.
