= 2016 Big South Conference men's soccer tournament =

- Classification: Division I
- Teams: 6
- Matches: 5
- Site: Patrick D. Cupp Memorial Stadium; Radford, Virginia
- Champions: Radford (3rd title)
- Winning coach: Marc Reeves (1st title)
- Broadcast: Big South Network, ESPN3

The 2016 Big South Conference men's soccer tournament, was the 33rd edition of the tournament. It determined the Big South Conference's automatic berth into the 2016 NCAA Division I Men's Soccer Championship.

Regular season champions, Radford won their third Big South title, defeating in-state rival, Longwood, 1–0 in the championship match. Radford's Sivert Daehlie scored the match-winning header in the 85th minute of play. It was Radford's first conference championship since 2000. Longwood was in their first Big South Conference championship, and were in their first conference championship since they reached the Atlantic Soccer Conference Tournament championship in 2011.

== Qualification ==
The top six teams in the Big South Conference based on their conference regular season records qualified for the tournament.

Pos	Team	Pld	W	D	L	GF	GA	GD	Pts	Qualification or relegation
1	Radford (C)	8	7	0	1	13	2	+11	21	NCAA Tournament, Big South Semifinals
2	High Point	8	5	2	1	17	5	+12	17	Big South Semifinals
3	UNC Asheville	8	5	0	3	6	12	−6	15	Big South Quarterfinals
4	Liberty	8	4	1	3	19	16	+3	13	Big South Quarterfinals
5	Presbyterian	8	4	0	4	11	10	+1	12	Big South Quarterfinals
6	Longwood	8	3	0	5	16	18	−2	9	Big South Quarterfinals
7	Gardner–Webb	8	2	1	5	9	12	−3	7	
8	Winthrop	8	2	0	6	0	0	0	6	
9	Campbell	8	2	0	6	0	0	0	6	

Updated to match(es) played on 10 November 2016.
Source: http://bigsouthsports.com/standings.aspx?path=msoc&standings=53
(C) Champions

== Bracket ==
Quarterfinals
4	Liberty	1
5	Presbyterian	2
3	UNC Asheville	1
6	Longwood	3

Semifinals
1	Radford (pen.)	1 (4)
5	Presbyterian	1 (2)
2	High Point	0
6	Longwood	1

Final
1	Radford	1
6	Longwood	0
