= 2018 Big South Conference men's soccer tournament =

- Classification: Division I
- Teams: 6
- Matches: 5
- Site: Martin Stadium; Clinton, South Carolina
- Champions: Campbell (5th title)
- Winning coach: Dustin Fonder (1st title)
- MVP: Gideon Betz (Campbell)
- Broadcast: ESPN+

2018 Big South Conference men's soccer standings
	Conf.					Overall
Team	W		L		T	W		L		T
High Point +	7	–	0	–	1	13	–	3	–	2
Radford	5	–	3	–	0	7	–	9	–	0
Presbyterian	5	–	3	–	0	8	–	12	–	0
Campbell ‡	4	–	3	–	1	9	–	9	–	3
Gardner–Webb	4	–	4	–	0	4	–	11	–	1
Longwood	3	–	4	–	1	5	–	13	–	1
USC Upstate	3	–	4	–	1	3	–	12	–	1
Winthrop	3	–	5	–	0	4	–	11	–	0
UNC Asheville	0	–	8	–	0	2	–	13	–	2
‡ – 2018 Big South Tournament champion + – Invited to the 2018 NCAA Division I Men's Soccer Championship; As of November 29, 2018; Rankings from United Soccer Coaches

The 2018 Big South Conference men's soccer tournament, will be the 29th edition of the tournament. It determined the Big South Conference's automatic berth into the 2018 NCAA Division I Men's Soccer Championship.

Campbell won the tournament, making it their first Big South championship since 1992. It was the program's fifth overall conference championship. They defeated the two-time defending champions, Presbyterian, in the final. With the title, Campbell earned an automatic berth to the NCAA Tournament, for the first time since 2007. They played NC State in the first round, where they lost 1–4. Regular season champions, High Point, earned an at-large bid into the NCAA Tournament, making it their first ever appearance in the NCAA Tournament. There, the Panthers lost to James Madison in the first round, by a 0-3 scoreline.

== Seeds ==
Seed	School	Conference	Tiebreaker
1	High Point	7–0–1	
2	Radford	5–3–0	RU 1–0 vs. PC
3	Presbyterian	5–3–0	PC 0–1 vs. RU
4	Campbell	4–3–1	
5	Gardner-Webb	4–4–0	
6	Longwood	3–4–1	

== Bracket ==
Quarterfinals; November 6
4	Campbell	3
5	Gardner–Webb	0
3	Presbyterian	3
6	Longwood	0

Semifinals; November 9
1	High Point	0 (2)
4	Campbell (pen.)	0 (3)
2	Radford	0
3	Presbyterian	2

Championship; November 11
4	Campbell	1
3	Presbyterian	0

== Results ==
=== Quarterfinals ===
November 4
6:05 p.m. EST

No. 4 Campbell	3–0	No. 5 Gardner–Webb
Signey 43', 89' (yellow card) 68'; Egeonu 62'	Report	Guerrero (yellow card) 32'; Catherall (yellow card) 75'

Eakes Athletics Complex, Buies Creek
Attendance: 223
Referee: Guido Gonzales

November 4
6:05 p.m. EST

No. 3 Presbyterian	3–0	No. 6 Longwood
Kitromilides 20'; Vannier 47'; Mangarov (yellow card) 76'	Report	Jaquier (yellow card) 35'

Martin Stadium, Clinton
Attendance: 148
Referee: Eric Usher

=== Semifinals ===
November 7
7:00 p.m. EST

No. 1 High Point	0–0 (a.e.t.)	No. 4 Campbell
	Report
Penalties
Inman (penalty scored); Baker (penalty missed); Kosmidis (penalty missed); Fenwick (penalty scored); Pineda (penalty missed)	2–3	(penalty scored) Betz; (penalty missed) Barrow; (penalty scored) Jacquel; (penalty scored) Morrison

Vert Stadium
High Point, North Carolina
Attendance: 795
Referee: Lance Jacob

November 7
7:00 p.m. EST

No. 2 Radford	0–2	No. 3 Presbyterian
	Report	Ilgner 41' (o.g.); Kitromilides 89'

Patrick D. Cupp Stadium
Radford, Virginia
Attendance: 472
Referee: Carmen Serbio

=== Final ===
November 11
2:00 p.m. EST

No. 3 Presbyterian	0–1 (a.e.t.)	No. 4 Campbell
	Report	Betz 99'

Martin Stadium, Clinton
Attendance: 504
Referee: Mark Buda

== All Tournament Team ==
**2018 Big South Men's Soccer All-Tournament team**

**Gideon Betz, Campbell**
Michael Barrow, Campbell
George Bediko, Campbell
Marcos Kitromilides, Presbyterian
Jan Hoffelner, Presbyterian
Victor Menudier, Presbyterian
Keegan Meyer, High Point
Johnny Fenwick, High Point
Benjamin Thiss, Radford
Myles Yorke, Radford
Jonas Kalchner, Longwood
David Moreno, Gardner-Webb

MVP in Bold
