= 2019 Campbell Fighting Camels soccer team =

American college soccer season

2019 Campbell Fighting Camels men's soccer

Big South regular season champions Big South tournament champions

NCAA Tournament, Second Round
- Conference: Big South Conference
- U. Soc. Coaches poll: No. 24
- Record: 17–3–2 (8–0–0 Big South)
- Head coach: Dustin Fonder (5th season)
- Assistant coaches: Alistair Moore (1st season); Ryan Hanson (2nd season)
- Home stadium: Eakes Athletic Complex

2019 Big South Conference men's soccer standings
	Conf.					Overall
Team	W		L		T	W		L		T
No. 24 Campbell ‡	8	–	0	–	0	17	–	3	–	2
High Point	7	–	1	–	0	13	–	7	–	0
Gardner–Webb	5	–	2	–	1	9	–	8	–	2
Winthrop	3	–	3	–	2	5	–	10	–	3
Presbyterian	3	–	4	–	1	6	–	13	–	1
Radford	3	–	5	–	0	5	–	11	–	2
UNC Asheville	3	–	5	–	0	4	–	12	–	1
Longwood	1	–	7	–	0	6	–	10	–	0
USC Upstate	1	–	7	–	0	5	–	12	–	0
‡ – 2019 Big South Tournament champion + – Invited to the 2019 NCAA Tournament; As of 17 December 2019; Rankings from United Soccer Coaches

The 2019 Campbell Fighting Camels soccer team represented Campbell University during the 2019 NCAA Division I men's soccer season and the 2019 Big South Conference men's soccer season. The regular season began on August 30 and concluded on November 2. It was the program's 57th season fielding a men's varsity soccer team, and their 9th season since rejoining the Big South Conference. The 2019 season was Dustin Fonder's fifth year as head coach for the program.

== Roster ==
As of March 30, 2020

Note: Flags indicate national team as defined under FIFA eligibility rules; some limited exceptions apply. Players may hold more than one non-FIFA nationality.

No.	Pos.	Nation	Player
0	GK	(Mexico) MEX	Samuel Lechuga
1	GK	(United States) USA	Matt Karasinski
2	DF	(England) ENG	Edward Fulwood
3	DF	(Ghana) GHA	Moses Mensah
4	DF	(France) FRA	Franck Momo
5	DF	(France) FRA	Bissafi Dotte
6	MF	(Germany) GER	Gideon Betz
7	MF	(United States) USA	Jalen James
8	MF	(England) ENG	Ian Rees
9	FW	(United States) USA	Alex Egeonu
10	FW	(United States) USA	Adrian Morales
12	MF	(United States) USA	Caleb Martinez
13	MF	(United States) USA	Tyler Young
15	MF	(Ghana) GHA	George Bediko

No.	Pos.	Nation	Player
16	MF	(England) ENG	Matt Lock
18	FW	(France) FRA	Thibaut Jacquel
19	FW	(United States) USA	Dailyn Crawley
21	FW	(Ghana) GHA	Emmanuel Owusu
22	FW	(United States) USA	Aigbekan Nosegbe
23	MF	(Germany) GER	Eren Elbustu
24	MF	(United States) USA	Humberto Chavez
25	MF	(Spain) ESP	Alemu Mercer-Miko
26	DF	(United States) USA	Dylan Sadler
27	DF	(United States) USA	Braden Teller
30	DF	(United States) USA	Luka Lazarevic
37	GK	(Spain) ESP	Edu Rodriguez
38	GK	(United States) USA	Peter Gilder

== Schedule ==
Date Time, TV	Rank^{#}	Opponent^{#}	Result	Record	Site (Attendance) City, State
Non-conference regular season
August 30*; 8:00 p.m.		at Memphis	L 0–4	0–1–0	Billy J. Murphy Track & Soccer Complex; Memphis, TN
September 1*; 8:00 p.m.		at Central Arkansas	T 1–1 ^{2OT}	0–1–1	Bill Stephens Track/Soccer Complex; Conway, AR
September 6*; 7:00 p.m.		American	W 4–0	1–1–1	Eakes Athletic Complex (215); Buies Creek, NC
September 8*; 2:00 p.m.		George Mason	W 3–0	2–1–1	Eakes Athletic Complex (105); Buies Creek, NC
September 13*; 7:00 p.m., ESPN+		UNC Greensboro	W 2–0	3–1–1	Eakes Athletic Complex (255); Buies Creek, NC
September 17*; 7:00 p.m.		at Coastal Carolina	L 0–1	3–2–1	CCU Soccer Field (145); Conway, SC
September 21*; 7:00 p.m., ESPN+		at Georgia Southern	W 1–0	4–2–1	Eagle Field (450); Statesboro, GA
September 25*; 7:00 p.m., ESPN+		UNC Wilmington	W 2–0	5–2–1	Eakes Athletic Complex (228); Buies Creek, NC
Big South Conference regular season
September 28; 7:00 p.m., ESPN+		Radford	W 2–1 ^{OT}	6–2–1 (1–0–0)	Eakes Athletic Complex (123); Buies Creek, NC
October 1*; 7:00 p.m.		at Wofford	W 2–0	7–2–1	Snyder Field (305); Spartanburg, SC
October 5; 7:00 p.m.		USC Upstate	W 1–0 ^{2OT}	8–2–1 (2–0–0)	Eakes Athletic Complex (114); Buies Creek, NC
October 9; 7:00 p.m., ESPN+		at Winthrop	W 3–1	9–2–1 (3–0–0)	Eagle Field (117); Rock Hill, SC
October 12; 2:00 p.m.		at Presbyterian	W 6–2	10–2–1 (4–0–0)	Martin Stadium (57); Clinton, SC
October 16; 7:00 p.m., ESPN+		Gardner–Webb	W 4–0	11–2–1 (5–0–0)	Eakes Athletic Complex (157); Buies Creek, NC
October 19; 1:00 p.m., ESPN+		at UNC Asheville	W 7–1	12–2–1 (6–0–0)	Greenwood Soccer Field (302); Asheville, NC
October 22*; 7:00 p.m., ESPN+		No. 21 North Carolina	T 1–1 ^{2OT}	12–2–2	Eakes Athletic Complex (415); Buies Creek, NC
October 28; 7:00 p.m.		Longwood	W 8–0	13–2–2 (7–0–0)	Eakes Athletic Complex (259); Buies Creek, NC
November 2; 7:00 p.m., ESPN+		at High Point	W 2–1	14–2–2 (8–0–0)	Vert Stadium (647); High Point, NC
Big South Tournament
November 13; 7:00 p.m., ESPN+	(1)	(5) Presbyterian; Semifinals	W 3–0	15–2–2	Eakes Athletic Complex (349); Buies Creek, NC
November 17; 2:00 p.m., ESPN+	(1)	(2) High Point; Championship Game	W 4–1	16–2–2	Eakes Athletic Complex (726); Buies Creek, NC
NCAA Tournament
November 21; 7:00 p.m.	No. 24	at James Madison; First Round	W 3–1	17–2–2	Sentara Park (684); Harrisonburg, VA
November 24; 1:00 p.m., ACCNX	No. 24	at (1) No. 1 Virginia; Second Round	L 0–2	17–3–2	Klöckner Stadium (1,460); Charlottesville, VA
*Non-conference game. ^{#}Rankings from United Soccer Coaches. (#) Tournament seedings in parentheses. All times are in Eastern Time.
