= 2017 Big South Conference men's soccer tournament =

- Classification: Division I
- Teams: 6
- Matches: 5
- Quarterfinals site: Higher seeds
- Semifinals site: Higher seeds
- Finals site: Vert Stadium; High Point, North Carolina
- Champions: Presbyterian (1st title)
- Winning coach: Jonathan Potter (1st title)
- MVP: Ricardo Hernandez (Presbyterian)
- Broadcast: Big South Network, ESPN3

2017 Big South Conference men's soccer standings
	Conf.					Overall
Team	W		L		T	W		L		T
High Point	7	–	1	–	0	10	–	5	–	4
Radford	5	–	1	–	2	10	–	4	–	4
Campbell	5	–	2	–	1	9	–	7	–	3
Liberty	5	–	3	–	0	11	–	6	–	1
Gardner–Webb	4	–	3	–	1	8	–	7	–	2
Presbyterian ‡	3	–	3	–	2	6	–	9	–	5
UNC Asheville	1	–	6	–	1	2	–	15	–	1
Longwood	1	–	6	–	1	1	–	15	–	2
Winthrop	1	–	7	–	0	3	–	13	–	1
‡ – 2017 Big South Tournament champion + – Invited to the 2017 NCAA Division I Men's Soccer Championship; As of November 17, 2017; Rankings from United Soccer Coaches

The 2017 Big South Conference men's soccer tournament, was the 34th edition of the tournament. It determined the Big South Conference's automatic berth into the 2017 NCAA Division I Men's Soccer Championship.

The defending champions, Radford, were eliminated in the semifinal round in a penalty shoot-out against Presbyterian.

== Qualification ==
The top six teams in the Big South Conference based on their conference regular season records qualified for the tournament.

Seed	Team	W	L	T	Pct	Pts
1	High Point	7	1	0	.875	21
2	Radford	5	1	2	.750	17
3	Campbell	5	2	1	.688	16
4	Liberty	5	3	0	.625	15
5	Gardner–Webb	4	3	1	.563	13
6	Presbyterian	3	3	2	.500	11

== Bracket ==
Quarterfinals
4	Liberty	3
5	Gardner–Webb	0
3	Campbell	1
6	Presbyterian	2

Semifinals
1	High Point	3
4	Liberty	1
2	Radford	0 (3)
6	Presbyterian (pen.)	0 (5)

Final
1	High Point	0 (3)
6	Presbyterian	0 (4)

== Results ==
=== Quarterfinals ===
November 5
2:00 p.m. EST

^{No. 4} Liberty Flames	3–0	^{No. 5} Gardner–Webb Runnin' Bulldogs
Mendoza 66', 85'; Mbuyu 90'	Report

Osborne Stadium, Lynchburg, Virginia
Attendance: 342
Referee: Eric Usher

November 5
7:00 p.m. EST

^{No. 3} Campbell Fighting Camels	1–2	^{No. 6} Presbyterian Blue Hose
Hughes 85'	Report	Hernandez 6'; O'Hara 38'

Eakes Athletics Complex, Buies Creek, North Carolina
Attendance: 281
Referee: Robert Sibiga

=== Semifinals ===
November 8
7:00 p.m. EST

^{No. 1} High Point Panthers	3–1	^{No. 4} Liberty Flames
Bolaños 4'; Cesar 36', 39'	Report	Mendoza 32'

Vert Track, Soccer and Lacrosse Stadium, High Point, North Carolina
Attendance: 545
Referee: Robert Sibiga

November 8
7:00 p.m. EST

^{No. 2} Radford Highlanders	0–0 (a.e.t.)	^{No. 6} Presbyterian Blue Hose
	Report
Penalties
Colmer (penalty scored); Strandsater (penalty scored); Valls (penalty scored); Erzen (penalty missed)	3–5	(penalty scored) Vannier; (penalty scored) Mikalsen; (penalty scored) Luedtke; (penalty scored) Edo Martin; (penalty scored) Hernandez

Cupp Stadium, Radford, Virginia
Attendance: 467
Referee: Kevin Broadley

=== Final ===
November 12
2:00 p.m. EST

^{No. 1} High Point Panthers	0–0 (a.e.t.)	^{No. 6} Presbyterian Blue Hose
	Report
Penalties
Inman (penalty scored); Kudolo (penalty scored); Fenwick (penalty scored); Benoysson (penalty missed); Bondswell (penalty missed)	3–4	(penalty missed) Vannier; (penalty scored) Mikalsen; (penalty scored) Luedtke; (penalty scored) Edo Martin; (penalty scored) Hernandez

Vert Track, Soccer and Lacrosse Stadium, High Point, North Carolina
Attendance: 1,367
Referee: Chris Penso

== All-Tournament team ==
- Ricardo Hernandez, MF, Presbyterian (MVP)
- Sergio Pinto, MF, Presbyterian
- Adrian Edo Martin, MF, Presbyterian
- Connor Behrend, GK, Presbyterian
- Rashid Tetteh, D, High Point
- Jonathan Bolanos, F, High Point
- Johnny Fenwick, D, High Point
- Pepe Segarra, MF, Liberty
- Kevin Mendoza, MF, Liberty
- Fraser Colmer, D, Radford
- Myles Yorke, D, Radford
- Jake Beyer, GK, Gardner-Webb
- Ian Rees, MF, Campbell

== See also ==
- Big South Conference
- 2017 NCAA Division I men's soccer season
- 2017 NCAA Division I men's soccer tournament
- 2017 Big South Conference Women's Soccer Tournament
