= 2012 Big South Conference men's soccer tournament =

Tournament details
- Country: United States
- Teams: 8

Final positions
- Champions: Winthrop
- Runners-up: Coastal Carolina

The 2012 Big South Conference men's soccer tournament was the 29th edition of the tournament. The tournament decided the Big South Conference champion and guaranteed representative into the 2012 NCAA Division I Men's Soccer Championship. Held from November 6–11, the semifinal and championship rounds were held at the Bryan Park Soccer Complex in Greensboro, North Carolina.

== Qualification ==
Team	Conference								Overall								Qualification
Team	Pld	W	L	T	GF	GA	GD	Pts	Pld	W	L	T	GF	GA	GD	Pts	Qualification
#12 Coastal Carolina	7	7	0	0	–	–	–	21	15	12	1	2	–	–	–	38	2012 Big South men's soccer tournament
Radford	6	6	0	0	–	–	–	18	13	8	2	3	–	–	–	27	2012 Big South men's soccer tournament
#32 High Point	6	4	1	1	–	–	–	14	14	11	2	1	–	–	–	34	2012 Big South men's soccer tournament
Campbell	7	4	3	0	–	–	–	12	14	9	4	1	–	–	–	28	2012 Big South men's soccer tournament
Liberty	5	4	1	0	–	–	–	12	12	6	6	0	–	–	–	18	2012 Big South men's soccer tournament
Gardner–Webb	5	2	2	1	–	–	–	7	14	3	10	1	–	–	–	10	2012 Big South men's soccer tournament
Longwood	2	1	1	0	3	2	+1	3	14	3	10	1	28	12	+16	21	2012 Big South men's soccer tournament
Presbyterian	2	1	1	0	0	0	0	3	10	7	3	0	0	0	0	21	2012 Big South men's soccer tournament
Winthrop	2	1	1	0	0	0	0	3	12	4	8	0	0	0	0	12	
VMI	2	1	1	0	0	0	0	3	11	4	7	0	0	0	0	12	
UNC Asheville	2	1	1	0	0	0	0	3	12	3	9	0	0	0	0	9	

As of 18 October 2012
Source: Big South
(RS) = Regular season champion; (TC) = Tournament champion
Only applicable when the season is not finished:
(Q) = Qualified to the phase of tournament indicated; (TQ) = Qualified to tournament, but not yet to the particular phase indicated; (E) = Eliminated

== Bracket ==
Quarterfinals
1	Coastal Carolina	5
8	Presbyterian	0
4	Campbell	4 (3)
5	High Point	4 (5)
2	Radford	2
7	Gardner–Webb	0
3	Liberty	1
6	Winthrop (OT)	2

Semifinals
1	Coastal Carolina	2
5	High Point	1
2	Radford	1
6	Winthrop	2 (OT)

Championship
1	Coastal Carolina	1
6	Winthrop	2

== Schedule ==
=== Quarterfinals ===
November 6, 2012	Gardner–Webb	0–2	Radford	Radford, VA
18:00 ET				Stadium: Cupp Stadium

November 6, 2012	Winthrop	2–1 (a.e.t.)	Liberty	Lynchburg, VA
18:00 ET				Stadium: Liberty Soccer Stadium

November 6, 2012	High Point	4–4 (a.e.t.) (5–3 p)	Campbell	Buies Creek, NC
19:00 ET				Stadium: Eakes Athletic Complex

November 6, 2012	Presbyterian	0–5	Coastal Carolina	Conway, SC
19:00 ET				Stadium: CCU Soccer Field

=== Semifinals ===
November 9, 2012	High Point	1–2	Coastal Carolina	Greensboro, NC
16:00 ET	Lawson (yellow card) 43'; Nyepon 60'; Malcolm (red card) 90'	Report	Ribeiro 21'; Garbanzo 25'	Stadium: Bryan Park Soccer Complex; Attendance: 238; Referee: Mark Kadlecik

November 9, 2012	Winthrop	2–1 (a.e.t.)	Radford	Greensboro, NC
19:30 ET	Isern 21' 93'; Brundle (yellow card) 19'; Obougou (yellow card) 26' (red card) 89'; Thorsson (yellow card) 33'	Report	Ulmo 2'; Park Kim (yellow card) 90'; Redondo (yellow card) 93'	Stadium: Bryan Park Soccer Complex; Attendance: 1,000; Referee: Guy Goodrich

=== Big South Championship ===
November 11, 2012	Winthrop	2–1	Coastal Carolina	Greensboro, NC
14:00 ET	Brundle 45'; Segarra 82'	Report	Hyde 80'	Stadium: Bryan Park Soccer Complex; Attendance: 346; Referee: Kenneth George

== See also ==
- Big South Conference
- 2012 Big South Conference men's soccer season
- 2012 NCAA Division I men's soccer season
- 2012 NCAA Division I Men's Soccer Championship
