= 2019 Big South Conference men's soccer tournament =

- Classification: Division I
- Teams: 6
- Matches: 5
- Quarterfinals site: Higher seeds
- Semifinals site: Higher seeds
- Finals site: Eakes Athletic Complex; Buies Creek, North Carolina
- Champions: Campbell (6th title)
- Winning coach: Dustin Fonder (2nd title)
- MVP: Ian Rees (Campbell)
- Broadcast: ESPN+

2019 Big South Conference men's soccer standings
	Conf.					Overall
Team	W		L		T	W		L		T
No. 24 Campbell ‡	8	–	0	–	0	17	–	3	–	2
High Point	7	–	1	–	0	13	–	7	–	0
Gardner–Webb	5	–	2	–	1	9	–	8	–	2
Winthrop	3	–	3	–	2	5	–	10	–	3
Presbyterian	3	–	4	–	1	6	–	13	–	1
Radford	3	–	5	–	0	5	–	11	–	2
UNC Asheville	3	–	5	–	0	4	–	12	–	1
Longwood	1	–	7	–	0	6	–	10	–	0
USC Upstate	1	–	7	–	0	5	–	12	–	0
‡ – 2019 Big South Tournament champion + – Invited to the 2019 NCAA Tournament; As of 17 December 2019; Rankings from United Soccer Coaches

The 2019 Big South Conference men's soccer tournament, was the 30th edition of the tournament. It determined the Big South Conference's automatic berth to the 2019 NCAA Division I men's soccer tournament.

Campbell won the tournament, making it their second consecutive and sixth all-time Big South championship. They defeated High Point in the final. With the title, Campbell earned their second consecutive automatic berth to the NCAA Tournament. They defeated James Madison in the first round 3–1, but fell to #1 Virginia in the second round 0–2.

== Seeds ==
Seed	School	Conference	Tiebreaker
1	Campbell	8–0–0	
2	High Point	7–1–0	
3	Gardner–Webb	5–2–1	
4	Winthrop	3–3–2	
5	Presbyterian	3–4–1	
6	Radford	3–5–0	2–1 vs. UNC Asheville

== Bracket ==
Quarterfinals; November 10
4	Winthrop	1
5	Presbyterian (2OT)	2
3	Gardner–Webb	2
6	Radford	1

Semifinals; November 13
1	Campbell	3
5	Presbyterian	0
2	High Point	3
3	Gardner–Webb	2

Championship; November 17
1	Campbell	4
2	High Point	1

== Results ==
=== Quarterfinals ===
November 10
6:00 p.m. EST

No. 4 Winthrop	1–2 (a.e.t.)	No. 5 Presbyterian
Rapp 7'; Jackson (yellow card) 80'	Report	Turcis 13'; Wilson 103'

Eagle Field, Rock Hill
Attendance: 414

November 10
6:00 p.m. EST

No. 3 Gardner–Webb	2–1	No. 6 Radford
Olsen 40'; Kortgodde 50'	Report	Ocampo 60' (yellow card) 27' (yellow-red card) 87'; Erzen (yellow card) 90'

Greene-Harbison Stadium, Boiling Springs
Attendance: 246
Referee: Jude Carr

=== Semifinals ===
November 13
7:05 p.m. EST

No. 1 Campbell	3–0	No. 5 Presbyterian
Betz (yellow card) 30'; Jacquel 41'; Elbustu (yellow card) 66'; James 68'; Rees 73'; Mercer-Miko (yellow card) 85'	Report	Pinto (yellow card) 70'; Ziegler (yellow card) 85'

Eakes Athletic Complex, Buies Creek
Attendance: 349
Referee: Dimitar Chavdarov

November 13
7:00 p.m. EST

No. 2 High Point	3–2	No. 3 Gardner–Webb
Kosmidis 12', 29'; Ayertey (yellow card) 74'; Abril 75'	Report	Gebrekiros 28', 47'; Salgado (yellow card) 75'

Vert Stadium, High Point
Attendance: 463
Referee: Robert Sibiga

=== Final ===
November 17
2:05 p.m. EST

No. 1 Campbell	4–1	No. 2 High Point
Lock 10'; Jacquel 13'; Rees 25'; James 30'; Mensah (yellow card) 56'	Report	Kosmidis 34'; Lonchar (yellow card) 64'; Abril (yellow card) 79'

Eakes Athletic Complex, Buies Creek
Attendance: 726
Referee: Rubiel Vazquez

== All Tournament Team ==
**2019 Big South Men's Soccer All-Tournament team**

**Ian Rees, Campbell**
Gideon Betz, Campbell
Thibaut Jacquel, Campbell
Jalen James, Campbell
Alessandro Sobacchi, High Point
Ilias Kosmidis, High Point
Jonathan Bolanos, High Point
Alain Delgado, Gardner–Webb
Abel Gebrekiros, Gardner–Webb
Luca Ziegler, Presbyterian
Sergio Pinto, Presbyterian
Victor Valls, Radford
Miles Rapp, Winthrop

MVP in Bold
