= 2021 Big South Conference men's soccer tournament =

- Classification: Division I
- Teams: 6
- Matches: 5
- Attendance: 1,832
- Site: Campus Sites (Higher Seed)
- Champions: Campbell (7th title)
- Winning coach: Dustin Fonder (3rd title)
- MVP: George Bediko (Campbell)
- Broadcast: ESPN+

2021 Big South Conference men's soccer standings
	Conf.					Overall
Team	W		L		T	W		L		T
Campbell ‡	7	–	0	–	1	15	–	4	–	2
High Point	5	–	0	–	3	8	–	7	–	3
Longwood	4	–	3	–	1	6	–	10	–	2
Winthrop	4	–	4	–	0	8	–	10	–	0
Presbyterian	3	–	3	–	2	7	–	6	–	3
Gardner–Webb	3	–	4	–	1	5	–	12	–	1
Radford	3	–	5	–	0	5	–	11	–	0
USC Upstate	2	–	4	–	2	4	–	9	–	3
UNC Asheville	0	–	8	–	0	1	–	14	–	1
‡ – 2021 Big South Tournament champion + – At-large invitation to the 2021 NCAA tournament; As of December 14, 2021; Rankings from United Soccer Coaches; Source: Big South

The 2021 Big South Conference men's soccer tournament was the postseason men's soccer tournament for the Big South Conference held from November 7 through November 14, 2021. The tournament was hosted on the campus of the higher seed each game. The six-team single-elimination tournament consisted of three rounds based on seeding from regular season conference play. High Point were the defending champions. However, they were unable to defend their crown, falling in to Campbell in the final. The conference tournament title was the seventh for the Campbell men's soccer program and the third for head coach Dustin Fonder. The title was Campbell's third in the last four years and their seven titles is two more than any other Big South men's soccer program. As tournament champions, Campbell earned the Big South's automatic berth into the 2021 NCAA Division I men's soccer tournament.

== Seeding ==
The top six teams in the regular season earned a spot in the tournament. Teams were seeded based on regular season conference record and tiebreakers were used to determine seedings of teams that finished with the same record. All games were hosted by the higher seed. The top two seeds also earned a bye into the quarterfinals. No tiebreakers were required as each team finished with a unique conference record.

Seed	School	Conference Record	Points
1	Campbell	7–0–1	22
2	High Point	5–0–3	16
3	Longwood	4–3–1	13
4	Winthrop	4–4–0	12
5	Presbyterian	3–3–2	11
6	Gardner–Webb	3–4–1	10

== Bracket ==
First round Sunday, Nov. 7
4	Winthrop	3
5	Presbyterian	0
3	Longwood	1
6	Gardner–Webb	2

Semifinals; Wednesday, Nov. 10
1	Campbell	7
4	Winthrop	0
2	High Point	5
6	Gardner–Webb	0

Final; Sunday, Nov. 14
1	Campbell	3
2	High Point	2

== Schedule ==
=== First round ===
November 7, 2021	#3 Longwood	1–2	#6 Gardner–Webb	Farmville, VA
2:00 p.m. ET	Markus Gronli (yellow card) 73'; Mason Butcher (yellow card) 75'; Owen Ludlow (yellow card) 80', (goal) 86'; Dan Ahrens (yellow card) 85'	Report	12', (yellow card) 85' Samuel Catherall; 15' Ryan Madondo; (yellow card) 40' Hendrik Kortgodde; (yellow card) 77' Giampaolo Nardi	Stadium: Longwood University Athletics Complex; Attendance: 124; Referee: Brandon Gardner; Assistant referees: Robert Velbis; Raymond Thomas; Fourth official: Brandon Ingram

November 7, 2021	#4 Winthrop	3–0	#5 Presbyterian	Rock Hill, SC
6:00 p.m. ET	Ethan Stevenson 21'; Brigham Larsen 30', (yellow card) 40'; Ben Goodman 60'	Report	(yellow card) 44' Niklas Hoener	Stadium: Eagle Field; Attendance: 175

=== Semifinals ===
November 10, 2021	#1 Campbell	7–0	#4 Winthrop	Buies Creek, NC
6:00 p.m. ET	Daniel Hernandez 7', 18', 51'; Kemy Amiche 21'; Jake Morris 53'; Kyoji Hata 56', 57'	Report	(yellow card) 34' William Cardona; (yellow card) 71' Sean Green	Stadium: Eakes Athletics Complex; Attendance: 403; Referee: JC Griggs; Assistant referees: Kevin Maurer; Kevin Uitto; Fourth official: Esli Leon

November 10, 2021	#2 High Point	5–0	#6 Gardner–Webb	High Point, NC
6:00 p.m. ET	Cooper Lindfelt 22'; Sebastian Chalbaud 32'; MD Myers 35'; Ashton Perkins 57'; Jackson Ruckman 76'	Report	(yellow card) 72' Samuel Catherall	Stadium: Vert Stadium; Attendance: 503; Referee: Toni Penso; Assistant referees: Rick Rogers; Jude Carr; Fourth official: Brandon Marion

=== Final ===
November 14, 2021	#1 Campbell	3–2	#2 High Point	Buies Creek, NC
1:00 p.m. ET	Kemy Amiche 6'; Bissafi Dotte 35'; Adrian Morales 45'; Moses Mensah (yellow card) 79'	Report	(yellow card) 13' Ashton Perkins; 14' MD Myers; (yellow card) 27', (goal) 38' Alessandro Sobacchi; (yellow card) 64' Karson Kendall; (yellow card) 64' Team	Stadium: Eakes Athletics Complex; Attendance: 627; Referee: David Erbacher; Assistant referees: Rick Rogers; Robert Velbis; Fourth official: Patrick Schmidt

== Statistics ==
=== Goalscorers ===
There were 23 goals scored in 5 matches, for an average of 4.6 goals per match (as of November 14, 2021).

3 goals

- Daniel Hernandez – Campbell

2 goals

- Kemy Amiche – Campbell
- Kyoji Hata – Campbell
- MD Myers – High Point

1 goal

- Bissafi Dotte – Campbell
- Adrian Morales – Campbell
- Jake Morris – Campbell
- Samuel Catherall – Gardner–Webb
- Ryan Madondo – Gardner–Webb
- Sebastian Chalbaud – High Point
- Cooper Lindfelt – High Point
- Ashton Perkins – High Point
- Jackson Ruckman – High Point
- Alessandro Sobacchi – High Point
- Owen Ludlow – Longwood
- Ben Goodman – Winthrop
- Brigham Larsen – Winthrop
- Ethan Stevenson – Winthrop

== All-Tournament team ==
Player	Team
**George Bediko**	Campbell
Kemy Amiche	Campbell
Bissafi Dotte	Campbell
Daniel Hernandez	Campbell
Alessandro Sobacchi	High Point
Mason Marcey	High Point
MD Myers	High Point
William Cardona	Winthrop
Ethan Stevenson	Winthrop
Sebastian Reventlow	Gardner-Webb
Ryan Madondo	Gardner-Webb
Ander Etxaniz	Longwood
Cesar Sancho	Presbyterian

MVP in bold
