= 2024 Big South Conference men's soccer tournament =

- Classification: Division I
- Teams: 6
- Matches: 5
- Attendance: 3,812
- Site: Campus Sites (Higher Seed)
- Champions: Gardner–Webb (1st title)
- Winning coach: Scott Wells (1st title)
- MVP: Aden O’Hara (Gardner–Webb)
- Broadcast: ESPN+

2024 Big South Conference men's soccer standings
	Conf.					Overall
Team	W		L		T	W		L		T
High Point	6	–	1	–	0	11	–	4	–	2
Gardner–Webb ‡	5	–	0	–	2	13	–	4	–	3
Winthrop	4	–	3	–	0	5	–	12	–	1
UNC Asheville	3	–	2	–	2	7	–	4	–	4
Longwood	2	–	4	–	1	5	–	10	–	3
Presbyterian	2	–	4	–	1	6	–	8	–	2
USC Upstate	2	–	5	–	0	3	–	14	–	0
Radford	0	–	5	–	2	0	–	13	–	3
‡ – 2024 Big South tournament champion + – At-large invitation to the 2024 NCAA tournament; As of December 17, 2024; Rankings from United Soccer Coaches; Source: Big South

The 2024 Big South Conference men's soccer tournament was the postseason men's soccer tournament for the Big South Conference held from November 6 to November 16, 2024. The tournament was hosted on the campus of the higher seed each game. The six-team single-elimination tournament consisted of three rounds based on seeding from regular season conference play. High Point were the defending champions. They were the top seed in the tournament but were unsuccessful in defending their tournament title. They were defeated by Gardner–Webb 2–1 in the Final. The conference tournament title was the first for the Gardner–Webb men's soccer program since joining the Big South in 2008. The title was also the first for head coach Scott Wells. As tournament champions, Gardner–Webb earned the Big South's automatic berth into the 2024 NCAA Division I men's soccer tournament.

== Seeding ==
The top six teams in the regular season earned a spot in the 2024 tournament. Teams were seeded based on regular season conference record and tiebreakers were used to determine seedings of teams that finished with the same record. All games were hosted by the higher seed. A tiebreaker was required to determine the fifth and sixth seeds as Longwood and Presbyterian both finished with 2–4–1 regular season records. The two teams met during the regular season on September 22 and Longwood prevailed 3–1. Therefore, Longwood was the fifth seed and Presbyterian was the sixth seed.

Seed	School	Conference Record	Points
1	High Point	6–1–0	18
2	Gardner–Webb	5–0–2	17
3	Winthrop	4–3–0	12
4	UNC Asheville	3–2–2	11
5	Longwood	2–4–1	7
6	Presbyterian	2–4–1	7

== Bracket ==
First round Saturday, Nov. 6
4	UNC Asheville	3
5	Longwood	4
3	Winthrop	1
6	Presbyterian	2

Semifinals; Monday, Nov. 10
1	High Point	1
5	Longwood	0
2	Gardner–Webb	2
6	Presbyterian	0

Final; Saturday, Nov. 16
1	High Point	1
2	Gardner–Webb	2

== Schedule ==
=== First Round ===
November 6, 2024	#4 UNC Asheville	3–4	#5 Longwood	Asheville, NC
6:00 p.m. EST	Brendan Herb 26', 79'; Edvin Grolimund (yellow card) 29'; Roger Sanguinetti (yellow card) 42'; Team (yellow card) 68'; Seth Hammond 73'; Aysa Hamid (yellow card) 78'	Report	8', 52', 78', (yellow card) 61' Ethan Stevenson; (yellow card) 43' Simao Coelho; 66' Aaron Asamoah; (yellow card) 75' Paul Espinoza	Stadium: Greenwood Soccer Field; Attendance: 765; Referee: Otto Leon; Assistant referees: Gunwan Park; Deny Kulasinak; Fourth official: Ralph Polson

November 6, 2024	#3 Winthrop	1–2	#6 Presbyterian	Rock Hill, SC
6:00 p.m. EST	Ethan Marks 7'; Rodrigo Ferreira (yellow card) 45'; Josh Sczech (yellow card) 71'	Report	67' Sandro Rabarivony; 68' Damorney Hutchinson; (yellow card) 83' Gabe Carvalho	Stadium: Eagle Field; Attendance: 168

=== Semifinals ===
November 10, 2024	#1 High Point	1–0	#5 Longwood	High Point, NC
6:00 p.m. EST	Jefferson Amaya 76'	Report		Stadium: Vert Stadium; Attendance: 395; Referee: Brandon Marion; Assistant referees: Khadime Sabara; Tarver Pike; Fourth official: Ralph Polson

November 10, 2024	#2 Gardner–Webb	2–0	#6 Presbyterian	Boiling Springs, NC
6:00 p.m. EST	Wyand Wessels 26'; Max Fisher (yellow card) 54'; Aden O'Hara 60'	Report	(yellow card) 26' Damian McGregor-Wickham; (yellow card) 63' Damorney Hutchinson; (yellow card) 71' Steven Cordova; (yellow card) 87' Jourdan Spence	Stadium: Greene–Harbison Stadium; Attendance: 350

=== Final ===
November 16, 2024	#1 High Point	1–2	#2 Gardner–Webb	High Point, NC
6:00 p.m. EST	Frankie DeFrancesco (yellow card) 35'; Lukas Kamrath 60'; Jefferson Amaya (yellow card) 66'; Mohammed Seidu (yellow card) 69'	Report	5', (yellow card) 48' Leo Andrade; (yellow card) 29' Breno Correia; 65' Aden O'Hara; (yellow card) 73' Wyand Wessels; (yellow card) 74', (yellow card) 83' Team	Stadium: Vert Stadium; Attendance: 2,134; Referee: Leland Grant; Assistant referees: Rick Rogers; Raymond Thomas; Fourth official: John Matto

== Statistics ==
=== Goalscorers ===
There were 16 goals scored in 5 matches, for an average of 3.2 goals per match (as of November 16, 2024).

3 goals

- Ethan Stevenson – Longwood

2 goals

- Brendan Herb – UNC Asheville
- Aden O'Hara – Gardner–Webb

1 goal

- Jefferson Amaya – High Point
- Leo Andrade – Gardner–Webb
- Aaron Asamoah – Longwood
- Seth Hammond – UNC Asheville
- Damorney Hutchinson – Presbyterian
- Lukas Kamrath – High Point
- Ethan Marks – Winthrop
- Sandro Rabarivony – Presbyterian
- Wyand Wessels – Gardner–Webb

== All-Tournament team ==
Player	Team
Leo Andrade	Gardner–Webb
Max Fisher	Gardner–Webb
Jalen Moore	Gardner–Webb
**Aden O’Hara**	Gardner–Webb
Jefferson Amaya	High Point
Celestin Blondel	High Point
Anthony Ramirez	High Point
Aaron Asamoah	Longwood
Ethan Stevenson	Longwood
Steven Cordova	Presbyterian
Sandro Rabarivony	Presbyterian
Brendan Herb	UNC Asheville
Rodrigo Ferriera	Winthrop

MVP in bold
