= 2011 Big South Conference men's soccer tournament =

2011 Big South men's soccer tournament
Tournament details
- Country: United States
- Teams: 8

The 2011 Big South men's soccer tournament was the 2011 edition of the tournament, which determines the men's college soccer champion of the Big South Conference, as well as the conference's automatic berth into the 2011 NCAA Division I Men's Soccer Championship. It began on November 10 and concluded on November 13. The tournament was won by Liberty, who defeated Gardner–Webb in the championship game.

== Bracket ==
Quarterfinals
1	Coastal Carolina	2
8	UNC Asheville	0
4	Liberty (a.e.t.)	0
5	Radford	0
2	Gardner–Webb	2
7	Winthrop	1
3	Campbell	1
6	High Point	3

Semifinals
1	Coastal Carolina	1
4	Liberty	2
2	Gardner–Webb	0 (a.e.t.)
6	High Point	0

Championship
4	Liberty
2	Gardner–Webb

== Schedule ==
=== Quarterfinals ===
The home team, or higher seed, is listed on the left, the away team is listed on the right.

November 10, 2011
12:00 PM EDT

Liberty	0 – 0 (a.e.t.)	Radford
	Report
Penalties
Betnick (penalty missed); Amoo (penalty scored); Aseweh (penalty scored); Clark (penalty scored); Bullock (penalty missed); White (penalty scored); Verville (penalty missed); Nino (penalty scored)	5 – 4	Grande (penalty scored); Fleming (penalty missed); Ulmo (penalty scored); Payne (penalty scored); Gwanzura (penalty missed); Mills (penalty scored); Janssen (penalty missed); Stinnett (penalty missed)

Greene-Harbison Field
Boiling Springs, North Carolina
Attendance: 175
Referee: Alex Prus

November 10, 2011
2:30 PM EDT

Coastal Carolina	2 – 0	UNC Asheville
Robstad 47'; Castro 65' (o.g.)	Report

Greene-Harbison Field
Boiling Springs, North Carolina
Attendance: 195
Referee: Robert Mann

November 10, 2011
5:00 PM EDT

Campbell	1 – 3	High Point
Girard 72'	Report	Okiomah 39'; Nyepon 55'; Martinez 81'

Greene-Harbison Field
Boiling Springs, North Carolina
Attendance: 210
Referee: Kenneth George

November 10, 2011
7:30 PM EDT

Gardner–Webb	2 – 1	Winthrop
Wall 29'; Clarke 44'	Report	Mantchev 68'

Greene-Harbison Field
Boiling Springs, North Carolina
Attendance: 275
Referee: Chris Penso

=== Semifinals ===
November 11, 2011
4:00 PM

Coastal Carolina	1 – 2	Liberty
Ribiero 65'	Report	Joseph 48'; Amoo 50'

Greene-Harbison Field
Boiling Springs, North Carolina
Attendance: 165
Referee: Abbas Piran

November 11, 2011
7:00 PM

Gardner–Webb	0 – 0 (a.e.t.)	High Point
	Report
Penalties
	4 – 3

Greene-Harbison Field
Boiling Springs, North Carolina
Attendance: 355
Referee: Brandon Marion

=== Championship ===
November 13, 2011
2:00 PM

Gardner–Webb	v	Liberty

Greene-Harbison Field
Boiling Springs, North Carolina

== See also ==
- Big South Conference
- 2011 Big South men's soccer season
- 2011 in American soccer
- 2011 NCAA Division I Men's Soccer Championship
- 2011 NCAA Division I men's soccer season
