= Campbell Fighting Camels men's soccer =

American college soccer team

- Founded: 1963; 63 years ago
- University: Campbell University
- Head coach: Dustin Fonder (8th season)
- Conference: CAA
- Location: Buies Creek, North Carolina, US
- Stadium: Eakes Athletics Complex (capacity: 1,000)
- Nickname: Fighting Camels
- Colors: Black and orange
Home	Away

NCAA tournament Round of 32
- 2019

NCAA tournament appearances
- 2007, 2018, 2019, 2021

Conference tournament championships
- 1984, 1985, 1991, 1992, 2007, 2018, 2019, 2021

Conference regular season championships
- 1984, 1985, 1988, 1990, 1993, 2005, 2008, 2009, 2019, 2021, 2022

The Campbell Fighting Camels men's soccer team represents Campbell University in all NCAA Division I men's college soccer competitions. The Fighting Camels currently play in the Coastal Athletic Association, and are coached by Dustin Fonder. The program plays their home matches at the Eakes Athletics Complex.

Most of the program's success came in the mid-1980s to early 1990s, and in the late 2010s to early 2020s. The Camels have won seven total Big South tournament championships and eight Big South regular season titles.

The program's most successful season came in 2019, when they won their first NCAA Tournament game in program history, reaching the second round, where they lost to eventual national runners-up, Virginia. Campbell has produced several players that have gone out to play professional soccer including Thibaut Jacquel, Jake Morris, David Doyle, and Josue Soto.

== Roster ==
As of Jul 2026

Note: Flags indicate national team as defined under FIFA eligibility rules; some limited exceptions apply. Players may hold more than one non-FIFA nationality.

No.	Pos.	Nation	Player
0	GK	USA	Caiden Lee
2	DF	USA	Julian Redrupp
4	DF	USA	James Jenkin
7	MF	NOR	Nicholas Vingsgard
12	MF	NOR	Mathias Odegaard
13	FW	USA	Kana Dube
15	MF	USA	Diego Ruiz
16	MF	USA	Holden Adams
17	MF	USA	Jayco Castro

No.	Pos.	Nation	Player
20	FW	USA	Auggie Squillace
21	MF	USA	Xander Martin
22	DF	USA	Camden Carner
23	MF	USA	Davis Reid
24	DF	USA	Gavin Cornelius
25	MF	USA	Xander Naguib
29	FW	USA	Dani Giovannetti
32	DF	USA	Adam Granai
37	GK	ENG	Will Blease
38	GK	USA	Kaeden Johnson

== Coaching staff ==
As of June 16, 2025. Number of seasons includes the upcoming fall 2025 season.

Name	Position coached	Consecutive season at Campbell in current position
Dustin Fonder	Head coach	10th
Lucas Champenois	Assistant coach	1st
Omar Asad	Assistant coach	2nd

== Championships ==
=== Conference regular season championships ===
Year	Coach	Overall Record	Conference Record
1984	Tim Morse	11–6–2	3–0–0
1985	Tim Morse	12–6–2	6–1–0
1988	Gary Hall	17–3–0	5–1–0
1990	Barry Howard	11–9–0	5–1–0
1993	Derrick Leeson	16–4	8–1
2005	Doug Hess	13–6–1	7–1–0
2008	Doug Hess	14–6–0	9–0–0
2009	Doug Hess	8–10–1	7–1–1
2019	Dustin Fonder	17–3–2	8–0–0
2021	Dustin Fonder	15–4–2	7–0–1
2022	Dustin Fonder	11–4–5	6–1–1
Conference regular season championships			11

=== Conference tournament championships ===
Year	Coach	Opponent	Score	Site	Overall Record	Conf. Record
1984	Tim Morse	Winthrop	2–0	Radford, VA	11–6–2	3–0
1985	Tim Morse	Radford	3–1	Conway, SC	12–6–2	5–1
1991	Derrick Leeson	Winthrop	4–0	Conway, SC	10–9–2	3–3
1992	Derrick Leeson	UNC Greensboro	2–0	Rock Hill, SC	12–8–1	4–3
2007	Doug Hess	Jacksonville	1–1 (5–4 pen.)	DeLand, FL	13–6–3	5–2–2
2018	Dustin Fonder	Presbyterian	1–0 (OT)	Clinton, SC	9–8–3	4–3–1
2019	Dustin Fonder	High Point	4–1	Buies Creek, NC	17–3–2	8–0
2021	Dustin Fonder	High Point	3–2	Buies Creek, NC	15–4–2	7–0–1
Conference tournament championships						8

== Seasons ==
Season	Team	Overall	Conference	Standing	Postseason
1963	Jim Cole	2–5–1			
1964	Jim Cole	7–5–0			
1965	Jim Cole	5–7–0			
1966	Jim Cole	8–4–1			
1967	Jim Cole	7–4–1			
1968	Jim Cole	9–3–1			
1969	Jim Cole	16–2–1			NAIA District 29 Champions; NAIA Tournament 5th place
1970	Jim Cole	16–2–1			NAIA District 29 Champions; NAIA Tournament 3rd place
1971	Jim Cole	14–1–1			NAIA District 29 Champions
1972	Jim Cole	11–5–0			
1973	Jim Cole	15–3–0			
1974	Jim Cole	14–2–0			NAIA District 29 Champions
1975	Jim Cole	14–6–0			NAIA District 29 Champions; NAIA Area V Champions; NAIA Tournament 6th place
1976	Darrell Saunders	9–8–1			NAIA District 29 Champions
NAIA Subtotal:		147–57–8			
NCAA Division I independent (1977–1983)
1977	Wayne Cunningham	7–7–1			
1978	Wayne Cunningham	2–10–3			
1979	Guenther Dietz	6–9–1			
1980	Guenther Dietz	7–7–2			
1981	Tim Morse	10–4–4			
1982	Tim Morse	9–6–2			
1983	Tim Morse	10–6–3			
Independent Subtotal:		51–49–16			
Big South Conference (1984–1993)
1984	Tim Morse	11–6–2	3–0–0	1st	Big South Champions
1985	Tim Morse	12–6–2	6–1–0	1st	Big South Champions
1986	Tim Morse	12–7–1	5–1–1	2nd	Big South Runners-up
1987	Gary Hall	6–10–1	3–3–0	4th	Big South Semifinals
1988	Gary Hall	17–3–0	5–1–0	T-1st	Big South Semifinals
1989	Barry Howard	12–7–0	4–2–0	T-2nd	Big South Runners-up
1990	Barry Howard	11–9–0	5–1–0	1st	Big South Semifinals
1991	Derrick Leeson	10–9–2	3–3–0	4th	Big South Champions
1992	Derrick Leeson	12–8–1	4–3–0	T-4th	Big South Champions
1993	Derrick Leeson	16–4–0	8–1–0	1st	Big South Runners-up
Big South Subtotal:		119–69–9	46–16–1		
ASUN Conference (1994–2010)
1994	Derrick Leeson	9–10–0	4–4–0	T-2nd, West	
1995	Derrick Leeson	12–6–2	6–1–1	1st, West	ASUN Runners-up
1996	Derrick Leeson	12–7–1	5–2–1	T-1st, West	ASUN Runners-up
1997	Derrick Leeson	8–11–0	7–1–0	1st, West	ASUN Semifinals
1998	Derrick Leeson	6–10–1	3–3–0	4th	ASUN Quarterfinals
1999	Derrick Leeson	5–12–0	1–5–0	7th	
2000	Derrick Leeson	6–12–1	3–2–1	4th	ASUN Semifinals
2001	Derrick Leeson	5–12–1	1–5–1	7th	
2002	Doug Hess	6–11–0	3–5–0	6th	
2003	Doug Hess	4–14–1	2–7–0	T-9th	
2004	Doug Hess	6–10–1	4–5–0	7th	
2005	Doug Hess	13–6–1	7–1–0	1st	ASUN Runners-up
2006	Doug Hess	10–7–2	4–1–2	3rd	ASUN Semifinals
2007	Doug Hess	13–6–3	5–2–2	3rd	ASUN Champions; NCAA First Round
2008	Doug Hess	14–6–0	9–0–0	1st	ASUN Runners-up
2009	Doug Hess	8–10–1	7–1–1	1st	ASUN Semifinals
2010	Steve Armas	6–9–4	4–5–0	6th	ASUN Quarterfinals
ASUN Subtotal:		143–159–19	75–50–9		
Big South Conference (2011–2022)
2011	Steve Armas	9–9–2	5–4–0	3rd	Big South Quarterfinals
2012	Steve Armas	12–5–2	7–3–0	T-3rd	Big South Quarterfinals
2013	Steve Armas	5–10–4	5–4–1	6th	Big South Quarterfinals
2014	Steve Armas	5–13–0	2–7–0	8th	Big South Quarterfinals
2015	Dustin Fonder	10–9–0	5–4–0	4th	Big South Semifinals
2016	Dustin Fonder	5–11–0	2–6–0	8th	
2017	Dustin Fonder	9–7–3	5–2–1	3rd	Big South Quarterfinals
2018	Dustin Fonder	9–8–3	4–3–1	4th	Big South Champions; NCAA First Round
2019	Dustin Fonder	17–3–2	8–0–0	1st	Big South Champions; NCAA Second Round
2020	Dustin Fonder	8–2–2	5–1–1	3rd	Big South Semifinals
2021	Dustin Fonder	15–4–2	7–0–1	1st	Big South Champions; NCAA First Round
2022	Dustin Fonder	11–4–5	6–1–1	1st	Big South Runners-up
Big South Subtotal:		115–85–25	61–35–6		
Coastal Athletic Association (2023–present)
2023	Dustin Fonder	4–6–4	2–4–2	T-7th	
2024	Dustin Fonder	8–6–4	3–4–1	T-7th	
CAA Subtotal:		12–12–8	5–8–3		
NCAA Division I Subtotal:		440–374–77	187–109–19		
Total:		587–431–85			
National champion Postseason invitational champion Conference regular season champion Conference regular season and conference tournament champion Division regular season champion Division regular season and conference tournament champion Conference tournament champion

== Postseason ==
=== NCAA tournament results ===
Campbell has appeared in four NCAA Tournaments. Their combined record is 1–4–0.

Year	Round	Opponent	Result
2007	First round	Furman	L 0–2
2018	First round	NC State	L 1–4
2019	First round Second round	James Madison; Virginia	W 3–1; L 0–2
2021	First round	Virginia Tech	L 1–2

== Stadiums ==
The Camels play most of their games at the 1,000-capacity Eakes Athletics Complex.

== See also ==
- Campbell Lady Camels soccer
