= 2022 Big South Conference men's soccer tournament =

- Classification: Division I
- Teams: 4
- Matches: 3
- Attendance: 1,636
- Site: Campus Sites (Higher Seed)
- Champions: High Point (2nd title)
- Winning coach: Zach Haines (2nd title)
- MVP: Noah Holmes (High Point)
- Broadcast: ESPN+

2022 Big South Conference men's soccer standings
	Conf.					Overall
Team	W		L		T	W		L		T
Campbell	6	–	1	–	1	11	–	4	–	5
High Point‡	5	–	0	–	3	11	–	5	–	5
USC Upstate	4	–	1	–	3	6	–	6	–	5
Presbyterian	3	–	3	–	2	10	–	5	–	2
Gardner–Webb	2	–	2	–	4	7	–	5	–	4
Radford	3	–	4	–	1	4	–	10	–	2
Winthrop	2	–	5	–	1	3	–	13	–	1
UNC Asheville	1	–	4	–	3	2	–	11	–	4
Longwood	0	–	6	–	2	2	–	10	–	5
‡ – 2022 Big South Tournament champion + – At-large invitation to the 2022 NCAA Tournament; As of December 13, 2022; Rankings from United Soccer Coaches; Source: Big South

The 2022 Big South Conference men's soccer tournament was the postseason men's soccer tournament for the Big South Conference held on November 6 and November 12, 2022. The tournament was hosted on the campus of the higher seed each game. The four-team single-elimination tournament consisted of two rounds based on seeding from regular season conference play. Campbell were the defending champions. However, they were unable to defend their crown, falling in to High Point in the final. The conference tournament title was the second for the High Point men's soccer program, both of which have come under head coach Zach Haines. The title was High Point's second in the last three years and their fourth straight year making the final of the tournament. As tournament champions, High Point earned the Big South's automatic berth into the 2022 NCAA Division I men's soccer tournament.

== Seeding ==
The top four teams in the regular season earned a spot in the tournament. Teams were seeded based on regular season conference record and tiebreakers were used to determine seedings of teams that finished with the same record. All games were hosted by the higher seed. No tiebreakers were required as each team finished with a unique conference record.

Seed	School	Conference Record	Points
1	Campbell	6–1–1	19
2	High Point	5–0–3	18
3	USC Upstate	4–1–3	15
4	Presbyterian	3–3–2	11

== Bracket ==
Semifinals; Wednesday, Nov. 10
1	Campbell	5
4	Presbyterian	0
2	High Point	3
3	USC Upstate	1

Final; Sunday, Nov. 14
1	Campbell	0
2	High Point	2

== Schedule ==
=== Semifinals ===
November 6	#1 Campbell	5–0	#4 Presbyterian	Buies Creek, NC
6:00 p.m. ET	Tyler Young 26'; Bissafi Dotte 34'; Kemy Amiche 43', 53'; Adrien Gameiro 57'	Report	(yellow card) 51' Iragi Kalala	Stadium: Eakes Athletics Complex; Attendance: 308; Referee: Esli Leon; Assistant referees: Aaron Hormuth; Nicholas Strednak; Fourth official: Carmen Serbio

November 6	#2 High Point	3–1	#3 USC Upstate	High Point, NC
6:00 p.m. ET	Noah Holmes 22'; Sebastian Chalbaud (yellow card) 28'; Jefferson Amaya 36' (pen.); Ashton Perkins 41'; Cooper Lindfelt (yellow card) 54' (yellow-red card) 55'	Report	(yellow card) 43' Braiden Hall; (yellow card) 59' Felipe Marty; 90' Kasper Jørgensen	Stadium: Vert Stadium; Attendance: 696; Referee: Amin Hadzic; Assistant referees: Khadime Sabara; Tarver Pyke; Fourth official: Patrick Lama

=== Final ===
November 12	#1 Campbell	0–2	#2 High Point	Buies Creek, NC
7:30 p.m. ET	Jalen James (yellow card) 54'; Adrien Gameiro (yellow card) 65'	Report	12', 81' Noah Holmes; (yellow card) 61' Jefferson Amaya; (yellow card) 87' Finn McRobb	Stadium: Eakes Athletics Complex; Attendance: 632; Referee: Guido Gonzalez; Assistant referees: Justin Howard; Bryson Condrey; Fourth official: Clive Edwards

== Statistics ==
=== Goalscorers ===
There were 11 goals scored in 3 matches, for an average of 3.67 goals per match (as of November 12, 2022).

3 goals

- Noah Holmes – High Point

2 goals

- Kemy Amiche – Campbell

1 goal

- Bissafi Dotte – Campbell
- Adrien Gameiro – Campbell
- Tyler Young – Campbell
- Jefferson Amaya – High Point
- Ashton Perkins – High Point
- Kasper Jørgensen – USC Upstate

== All-Tournament team ==
Player	Team
Sebastian Chalbaud	High Point
**Noah Holmes**	High Point
Finn McRobb	High Point
Holden Trent	High Point
Kemy Amiche	Campbell
Kyoji Hata	Campbell
Tyler Young	Campbell
Luca Bulfon	USC Upstate
Pablo Diaz	USC Upstate
Nacho Gallego	Presbyterian
Carson Griffith	Presbyterian

MVP in bold
