= 2023 Big South Conference men's soccer tournament =

- Classification: Division I
- Teams: 4
- Matches: 3
- Attendance: 3,059
- Site: Campus Sites (Higher Seed)
- Champions: High Point (3rd title)
- Winning coach: Zach Haines (3rd title)
- MVP: Seth Antwi (High Point)
- Broadcast: ESPN+

2023 Big South Conference men's soccer standings
	Conf.					Overall
Team	W		L		T	W		L		T
High Point ‡	6	–	0	–	1	10	–	4	–	5
UNC Asheville	4	–	2	–	1	10	–	5	–	3
Winthrop	3	–	2	–	2	4	–	11	–	2
Gardner–Webb	2	–	2	–	3	4	–	9	–	4
Presbyterian	2	–	3	–	2	5	–	8	–	3
Radford	2	–	4	–	1	3	–	11	–	3
USC Upstate	2	–	4	–	1	5	–	10	–	2
Longwood	1	–	5	–	1	6	–	6	–	3
‡ – 2023 Big South tournament champion + – At-large invitation to the 2023 NCAA tournament; As of December 12, 2023; Rankings from United Soccer Coaches; Source: Big South

The 2023 Big South Conference men's soccer tournament was the postseason men's soccer tournament for the Big South Conference held on November 5 and November 11, 2023. The tournament was hosted on the campus of the higher seed each game. The four-team single-elimination tournament consisted of two rounds based on seeding from regular season conference play. High Point were the defending champions. They successfully defended their title as the top seed in the tournament. They defeated UNC Asheville in a penalty shoot-out in the Final. The conference tournament title was the third for the High Point men's soccer program, all of which have come under head coach Zach Haines. The title was High Point's third in the last four years and their fifth straight year making the final of the tournament. As tournament champions, High Point earned the Big South's automatic berth into the 2023 NCAA Division I men's soccer tournament.

== Seeding ==
The top four teams in the regular season earned a spot in the tournament. Teams were seeded based on regular season conference record and tiebreakers were used to determine seedings of teams that finished with the same record. All games were hosted by the higher seed. No tiebreakers were required as each team finished with a unique conference record.

Seed	School	Conference Record	Points
1	High Point	6–0–1	19
2	UNC Asheville	4–2–1	13
3	Winthrop	3–2–2	11
4	Gardner–Webb	2–2–3	9

== Bracket ==
Semifinals; Sunday, Nov. 5
1	High Point (a.e.t.)	1
4	Gardner–Webb	0
2	UNC Asheville (a.e.t.)	1
3	Winthrop	0

Final; Saturday, Nov. 11
1	High Point (pen.)	1 (4)
2	UNC Asheville	1 (3)

== Schedule ==
=== Semifinals ===
November 5	#2 UNC Asheville	1–0 (a.e.t.)	#3 Winthrop	Asheville, NC
2:00 p.m. ET	Griffin Stidham (yellow card) 67'; Edvin Grolimund 107'	Report	(yellow card) 90' Ricardo Ferreira; (yellow card) 99' Sam Pidgeon	Stadium: Greenwood Soccer Field; Attendance: 450; Referee: Kyle Johnston; Assistant referees: Khadime Sabara; Tyler Bost; Fourth official: Patrick Lama

November 5	#1 High Point	1–0 (a.e.t.)	#4 Gardner–Webb	High Point, NC
6:00 p.m. ET	Anthony Ramirez (yellow card) 66'; Alex Abril 100'	Report	(yellow card) 66' Max Fisher; (yellow card) 90' Tiago Campos	Stadium: Vert Stadium; Attendance: 631; Referee: Amin Hadzik; Assistant referees: Joseph Wehrle; Marcus Moss; Fourth official: Tarik Veledar

=== Final ===
November 11	#1 High Point	1–1 (a.e.t.) (4–3 p)	#2 UNC Asheville	High Point, NC
7:00 p.m. ET	Seth Antwi 32'; Karson Kendall (yellow card) 105'; Justin Stewart (yellow card) 110'	Report	18' Sam Pitts-Eckersall; (yellow card) 79' Myles Edmondson; (yellow card) 91' Roger Sanguinetti; (yellow card) 101' Edvin Grolimund	Stadium: Vert Stadium; Attendance: 1,978; Referee: Daniel Radford; Assistant referees: Rick Rogers; Thomas Rutherford; Fourth official: Clive Edwards
	Penalties
	Jefferson Amaya (penalty scored); Seth Antwi (penalty scored); Finn McRobb (penalty scored); Anthony Ramirez (penalty scored)		(penalty missed) Brendan Herb; (penalty scored) Edvin Grolimund; (penalty scored) Roger Sanguinetti; (penalty scored) Michael Wilkerson; (penalty missed) Aidan Whitlock

== Statistics ==
=== Goalscorers ===
There were 4 goals scored in 3 matches, for an average of 1.33 goals per match (as of November 11, 2023).

1 goal

- Seth Antwi – High Point
- Edvin Grolimund – High Point
- Alex Abril – UNC Asheville
- Sam Pitts-Eckersall – UNC Asheville

== All-Tournament team ==
Player	Team
Santiago Hoyos	Gardner–Webb
Max Fisher	Gardner–Webb
Alex Abril	High Point
**Seth Antwi**	High Point
Finn McRobb	High Point
Tony Pineda	High Point
Edvin Grolimund	UNC Asheville
Brendan Herb	UNC Asheville
Aidan Whitlock	UNC Asheville
Nick Guido	Winthrop
Jack Kilstrom	Winthrop

MVP in bold
