= Big South Tournament =

Big South Tournament may refer to the championship of any sport sponsored by the Big South Conference, including the following:

- Big South Conference men's basketball tournament
- Big South Conference men's soccer tournament
- Big South Conference baseball tournament
