= Presbyterian Baseball Complex =

Baseball venue in Clinton, South Carolina, US

Presbyterian College Baseball Complex
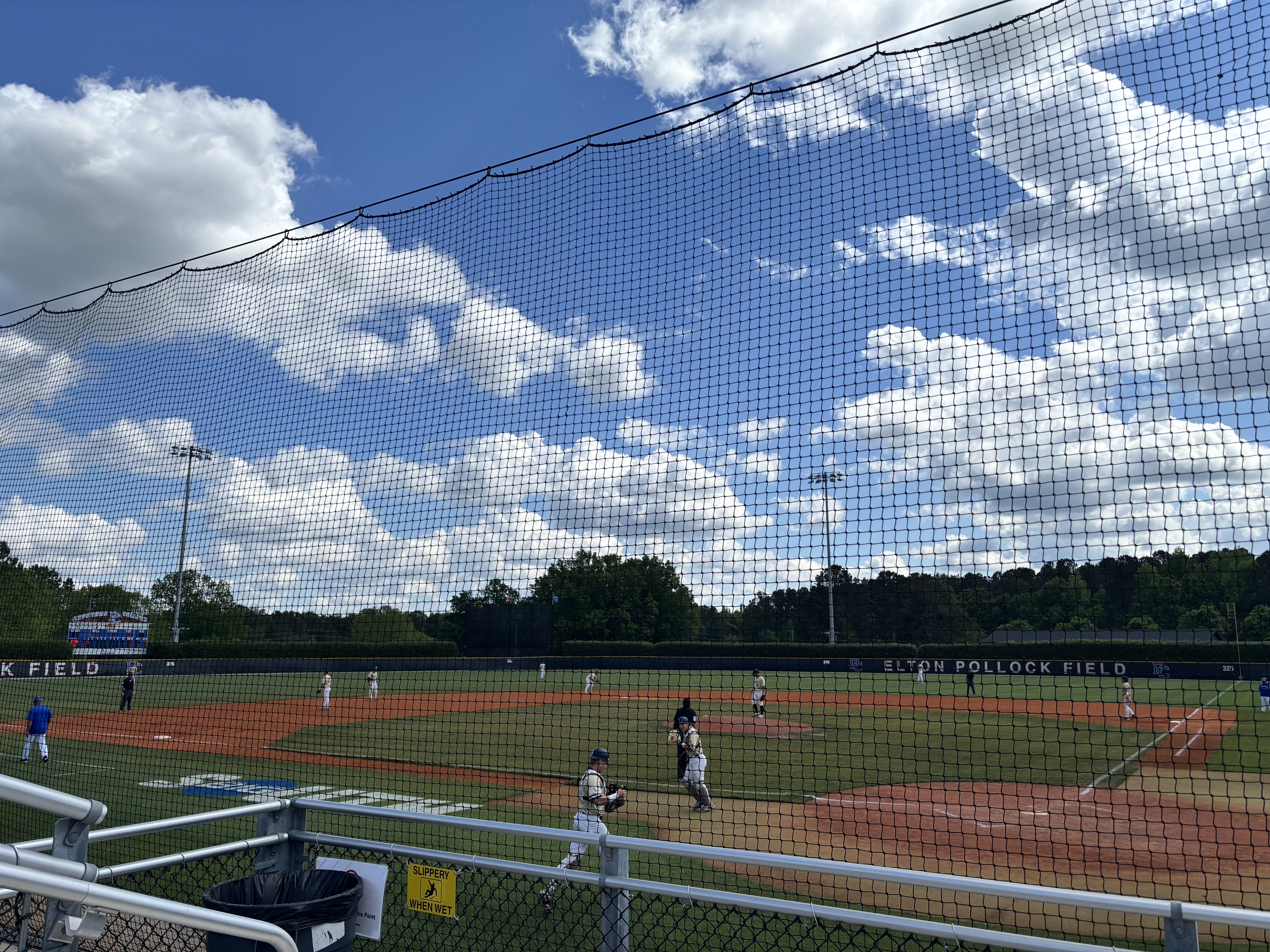
- During a 2025 game against Charleston Southern
- Interactive map of Presbyterian College Baseball Complex
- Location: East Maple Street, Clinton, South Carolina, US
- Coordinates: 34.461828°N 81.864195°W
- Owner: Presbyterian College
- Surface: Natural grass
- Scoreboard: Yes
- Field size: Left Field - 325 feet Left Center - 375 feet Center Field - 400 feet Right Center - 375 feet Right Field - 325 feet

Construction
- Built: Late 1980s

Tenant
- Presbyterian Blue Hose baseball

The Presbyterian College Baseball Complex is a baseball venue on the campus of Presbyterian College in Clinton, South Carolina, US. It is home to the Presbyterian College Blue Hose of the Division I Big South Conference. Also known as the Blue Hose Baseball Complex and The Plex, the field is located on East Maple Street on the college's campus. The facility was built in the late 1980s.

== See also ==
- List of NCAA Division I baseball venues
