= Macpherson Stadium (North Carolina) =

Soccer stadium in Browns Summit, North Carolina

Coordinates: 36°10′0″N 79°44′42″W

- Interactive map of Macpherson Stadium
- Location: Browns Summit, North Carolina
- Owner: North Carolina Fusion; Greensboro United Soccer Association
- Operator: Carolina Dynamo, GYSA
- Capacity: 3,000 (all seated, 2009)
- Surface: Natural Grass

Construction
- Opened: May 4, 2002

Tenants
- North Carolina Fusion U23 (2002–present); Carolina Lady Dynamo (2002–present); Greensboro College (2002–2016); North Carolina Fusion Women (2022–future); Burlington United FC (2025-future)

Macpherson Stadium, located in Browns Summit, North Carolina's Bryan Park (Browns Summit is a suburb of Greensboro), is a USL League Two stadium that seats 7,000 and is the home to PDL club North Carolina Fusion U23 and the Greensboro College men's soccer team. Prior to the opening of Macpherson Stadium, the team played at UNCG Soccer Stadium. The stadium hosted the soccer events for the 2007 State Games of North Carolina.

On February 12, 2008 the Dynamo announced plans to expand the stadium to 7,000 seats after the 2008 season from its previous capacity of 3000 all seated.

Macpherson Stadium served as one of the hosts for the 2020 NCAA Division I Men's Soccer Tournament and the 2020 NCAA Division I Women's Soccer Tournament.
