= Martin Stadium at Edens Field =

Soccer stadium in Clinton, South Carolina

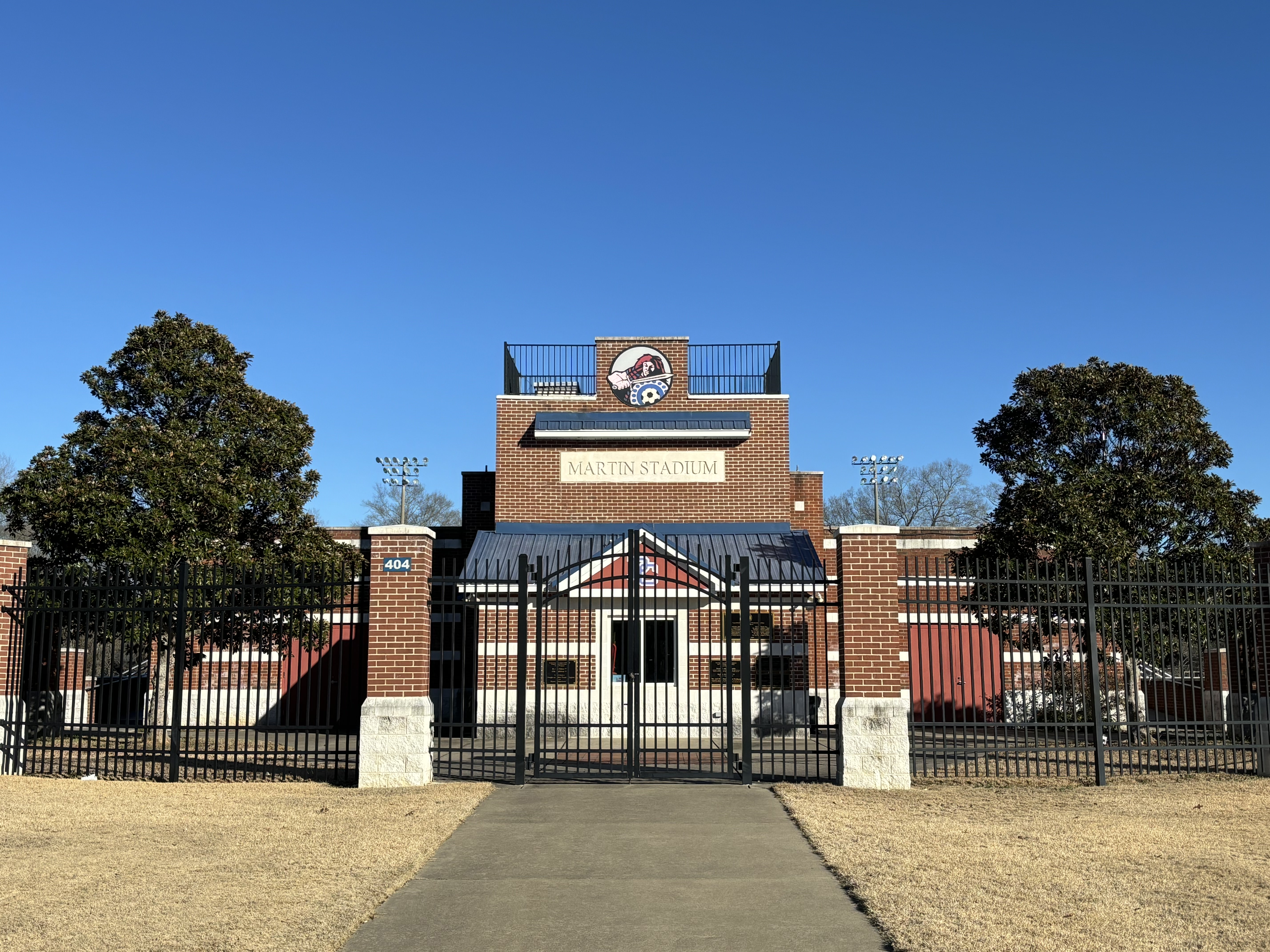
- Stadium exterior in January 2024
- Interactive map of Martin Stadium at Edens Field
- Full name: Martin Stadium at Dr. Robert M. Edens Field
- Address: 883 5th Ave; Clinton, SC 29325
- Coordinates: 34.465693°N 81.867784°W
- Owner: Presbyterian College
- Operator: Presbyterian College
- Capacity: 400
- Type: Soccer-specific stadium
- Scoreboard: Daktronics
- Field size: 115 x 75 yards
- Field shape: Rectangular
- Acreage: 6

Construction
- Opened: 2000

Tenants
- Presbyterian Blue Hose men's soccer Presbyterian Blue Hose women's soccer

Website
- Martin Stadium at Edens Field

Martin Stadium at Dr. Robert M. Edens Field is a soccer-specific stadium on the campus of Presbyterian College in Clinton, South Carolina. The stadium hosts the Presbyterian Blue Hose men's and women's soccer teams. The facility opened in 2000, and sits 400.

The stadium will host the 2018 final of the Big South Conference Men's Soccer Tournament.
