= Coastal Carolina University Soccer Field =

Soccer stadium in Conway, South Carolina

Coastal Carolina University Soccer Stadium
- Interactive map of Coastal Carolina University Soccer Stadium
- Address: United States
- Location: Conway, SC
- Coordinates: 33°47′29″N 79°00′58″W
- Operator: Coastal Carolina University
- Capacity: 1,000
- Type: Soccer-specific stadium

Construction
- Opened: 2003
- Closed: 2023; 3 years ago
- Demolished: 2024

Tenants
- Coastal Carolina Chanticleers (NCAA) teams: men's and women's soccer (2003-2023)

Coastal Carolina University Soccer Field was a soccer-specific stadium in Conway, South Carolina on the Coastal Carolina University campus. The field was home to the Coastal Carolina Chanticleers men's and women's soccer teams.

The facility had a capacity of 1,000 people. It was closed in 2023 to build a new stadium, the CCU Soccer Complex, inaugurated in August 2024.
