= Liberty Flames soccer =

American college soccer team

- Founded: 1979; 47 years ago
- University: Liberty University
- Head coach: Scott Wells (1st season)
- Conference: SoCon
- Location: Lynchburg, Virginia, US
- Stadium: Osborne Stadium (capacity: 1,000)
- Nickname: Flames
- Colors: Red, white, and blue
Home	Away

NCAA tournament appearances
- 2007, 2011

Conference tournament championships
- 2007, 2011

Conference regular season championships
- 2007, 2008, 2009

The Liberty Flames men's soccer team is an intercollegiate varsity sports team of Liberty University. As of the upcoming 2026 season, the team is a member of the NCAA Division I Southern Conference after having played the previous three seasons in the Ohio Valley Conference. Twice in the program's history they have qualified for the NCAA Division I Men's Soccer Championship, earning bids into the 2007 and 2011 editions of the tournament while a member of the Big South Conference.

== Roster ==
As of 18 Sep 2024

Note: Flags indicate national team as defined under FIFA eligibility rules; some limited exceptions apply. Players may hold more than one non-FIFA nationality.

No.	Pos.	Nation	Player
1	GK	USA	Blake Franzen
2	DF	USA	Perry Blay
3	DF	USA	Lucas Kelly
4	DF	CRC	Brandon Calderon
5	DF	BRA	Carlos Trott
6	MF	USA	Ty Conley
7	FW	USA	Gora Gora
8	MF	USA	Aidan Morrison
9	FW	USA	Sam Farner
10	MF	USA	Luke Eberle
11	MF	USA	Gabe Findley
12	DF	USA	Skyler Stricker
13	FW	USA	Dylan Swinehart

No.	Pos.	Nation	Player
14	DF	USA	Spencer Moler
16	DF	USA	Grayson Gardner
17	FW	USA	Matthew Torrell
18	DF	USA	Bryce Swinehart
19	MF	USA	Elijah John
20	FW	USA	Leo Conneh
21	DF	USA	Jack Davis
23	FW	USA	Michael Huss
24	MF	CAN	Alexander Krakowiak
26	DF	USA	Leandro Yzaguirre
28	GK	USA	Owen Moore
30	DF	USA	Tyee Allen
31	GK	USA	Tyler Beck
