= Eagle Field (stadium) =

Soccer stadium in Rock Hill, South Carolina

Coordinates: 34°56′37″N 81°0′43″W

- Interactive map of Eagle Field
- Location: Winthrop University Athletic Complex; Rock Hill, South Carolina
- Owner: Winthrop University
- Capacity: 1,800; Record: 2,175
- Surface: Grass

Construction
- Opened: 1997

Tenants
- Winthrop Eagles Men's Soccer and Women's Soccer (NCAA); Winthrop Eagles Women's Lacrosse] Charlotte Eagles secondary home

Eagle Field is a soccer-specific stadium located in Rock Hill, South Carolina, United States, on the campus of Winthrop University.

The 1,500 seat stadium was built in 1997 and upgraded in 2001 and 2005. It is rated as one of the top soccer facilities in Metrolina.

In 2013, Eagle Field and the Charlotte Eagles of the USL Pro hosted the first MLS team in the upstate of South Carolina when the Chicago Fire Soccer Club came to town for the U.S. Open Cup.
