= Patrick D. Cupp Stadium =

Coordinates: 37.139371°N 80.543923°W

The Patrick D. (Darius) Cupp Stadium (usually called Cupp Stadium) is a multi-use stadium located in Radford, Virginia on the campus of Radford University.

Cupp Stadium seats 5,000 with a roof over the premium seats. The stadium is used by Radford's soccer, track and field and lacrosse teams.
