= Gardner–Webb Runnin' Bulldogs men's soccer =

American college soccer team

- Founded: 1987; 39 years ago
- University: Gardner–Webb University
- Head coach: Scott Wells (1st season)
- Conference: Big South
- Location: Shelby, North Carolina, US
- Stadium: Greene–Harbison Stadium (capacity: 1,500)
- Nickname: Bulldogs
- Colors: Red and black
Home	Away

NCAA tournament Round of 32
- 2006, 2024

NCAA tournament appearances
- 2006, 2024

Conference tournament championships
- 2006, 2024

Conference Regular Season championships
- 2006

The Gardner–Webb Runnin' Bulldogs men's soccer program represents Gardner–Webb University in all NCAA Division I men's college soccer competitions. Founded in 1987, the Runnin' Bulldogs compete in the Big South Conference. The Runnin' Bulldogs are coached by Tony Setzer, who has coached the program since 1988. Gardner–Webb plays their home matches at Greene–Harbison Stadium, on the campus of Gardner–Webb University.

== Seasons ==
=== NCAA Tournament history ===
Gardner-Webb has appeared in two NCAA Tournaments. Their two appearances came in 2006 and 2024. Their combined NCAA record is 0–1–1.

Season	Round	Opponent	Score
2006	First round	UAB	T 1–1
2006	Second round	Clemson	L 1–3
2024	First round	Oregon State	W 1–0
2024	Second round	#3 Denver	L 0–3
