= Radford Highlanders men's soccer =

Men's Soccer team of Radford University

Radford Highlanders Men's Soccer
- 2026 Radford Highlanders men's soccer team
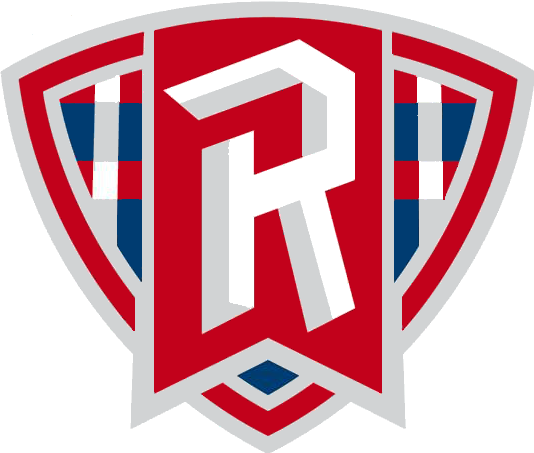
- Founded: 1975; 51 years ago
- University: Radford University
- Head coach: Andy Cormack (1st season)
- Conference: Big South
- Location: Radford, Virginia, US
- Stadium: Patrick D. Cupp Stadium (capacity: 5,000)
- Nickname: Highlanders
- Colors: Red, gray, and white
Home	Away

NCAA tournament appearances
- 1999, 2000, 2015, 2016

Conference tournament championships
- 1988, 1999, 2000, 2016

Conference regular season championships
- 1987, 1988, 1991, 1998, 2014, 2015, 2016

The Radford Highlanders Men's Soccer team is an intercollegiate varsity sports team of Radford University, located in Radford, Virginia. The team is a member of the Big South Conference of the National Collegiate Athletic Association. The team was founded in 1975 as the result of the combined efforts of student-activist G. Thomas Lillard, University President Donald Dedmon, and Athletic Director Charles (Chuck) Taylor.

The Beginning

Tom Lillard played serious soccer both as a youth and as a student at Yorktown High School in Arlington, Virginia. Upon graduation from Yorktown in 1974, he chose to attend then-named Radford College, knowing full well that the school did not have a varsity men’s soccer team, but that he still wanted to keep playing. At the time, Radford College was undergoing significant change. Formerly, it had been an all-women’s school, known particularly for its education and nursing curricula. Unfortunately, enrollment had been falling at Radford due to major expansion at nearby Virginia Tech, which had dropped a military requirement for men in 1964 and then actively started recruiting women and significantly increasing its student capacity.

When President Dr. Donald N. Dedmon arrived at Radford in 1972, one of his first improvements was to make the institution co-educational. Another was to expand and improve the entire scope of the school’s mission and instructional offerings, ultimately achieving University status. As part of the transformation, he included upgrading Radford’s athletic programs, adding men’s sports, and expanding the number of offerings for both women and men. Dr. Dedmon was intimately familiar with helping schools in need. He had come from the presidency of Marshall University where he had guided its recovery from a horrific plane crash on November 14, 1970. The crash killed 37 members of the varsity football team, eight coaches, and 25 school boosters. [Dedmon’s heroic actions to help the school recover from this tragedy were unfortunately not given the appropriate recognition he deserved in the movie, “We Are Marshall.”]

Chuck Taylor joined Lillard and Dedmon in the establishment of Radford University’s men’s varsity soccer program. Taylor, the university’s first athletics director, initially arrived as a professor and served as athletics director from 1974 to 1996. During his tenure, Radford’s athletics program transitioned from a six-sport, unaffiliated small-college program to NCAA Division I, where it has competed since 1984. Seven Radford athletic programs achieved national rankings during Taylor’s tenure.

Tom Lillard wanted to play on a men’s varsity soccer team, and Dr. Dedmon and Chuck Taylor supported establishing one. At age 18, Lillard met repeatedly with senior administrators to discuss creating the team. Dedmon supported the effort as part of his larger plan, while Taylor was willing to assist with the development of athletics. The team still needed players and a coach, although a club team was already in place.

The Club Team (1974)

Right at the beginning of school in the fall of 1974, Lillard joined the drumbeat of what would ultimately become the core of the first varsity team. In 1973, a group of guys had previously coalesced, first in front of Muse dorm and McConnell Library, and then on Radford College’s central student courtyard, “Moffett Field,” just to kick around because of their love of soccer. They were then recognized as a formal extramural club team and played other clubs and college junior varsity squads. It took well into the fall, but Moffett Field (sometimes called Moffett Lawn when not used for sports) was lined for soccer and would become home turf. Lillard knew that this was the group that was needed for varsity, intercollegiate, competition and Lillard promoted their readiness to Dedmon and Taylor. A graduate student, Ivo (John) Ravnik, had been the club coach (assisted by Bob Ola) and the team had demonstrated through scrimmages, exhibitions, and full games – both at home and away – that they could perform. Coach Ravnik, who had left his native Yugoslavia as a teenager, played soccer in high school in America and later at San Francisco State University.

Following his success with the club program, Chuck Taylor asked Coach Ravnik if he would be willing to stay on as the first varsity coach, and Ravnik agreed.

== Roster ==
As of 1 Oct 2024

Note: Flags indicate national team as defined under FIFA eligibility rules; some limited exceptions apply. Players may hold more than one non-FIFA nationality.

No.	Pos.	Nation	Player
1	GK	ENG	Felix Davies
2	DF	USA	Mason McClendon
3	DF	NED	Thijmen Lansing
4	FW	USA	Colin Hawes
5	MF	USA	Mustaph Kamara
6	MF	USA	Jan Maldonado
7	MF	GER	Florian Senst
8	DF	NED	Joep de Bruin
10	MF	GER	Tamin Choi
12	MF	USA	Riley Usher
13	FW	DEN	Simon Blaesdahl
14	FW	USA	Cristian Cruz
15	MF	ESP	Akos Tajtyi
16	MF	ESP	Kevin Habibelahy
17	DF	USA	Landon Redding

No.	Pos.	Nation	Player
18	DF	USA	Tyler Pulik
19	FW	USA	Evan Rupe
20	FW	USA	Seth Clark
21	MF	USA	Matthew Pardieck
22	MF	USA	Hagen Kyle
23	DF	USA	Donovan McClellan
24	MF	USA	Aiden O'Sullivan
25	MF	COD	Sadock Kilosho
26	MF	USA	Leon Masudi
27	MF	IRQ	Kanosh Abdulameer
28	MF	USA	John McGarry
29	DF	USA	Jackson Triche
30	GK	USA	Troy Nine
31	DF	USA	Cam Lamptey

== Coaching staff ==
Position	Name
Head coach	(United States) Andy Cormack
Asst. Coach	(United States) Ryan Palmbaum
Asst. Coach	(United States) John White

== Statistics in the NCAA Tournament ==
Year	Round	Opponent	Score
1999	Play-in	Furman	0–1
2000	Play-in	Furman	0–2
2015	First Round	Charlotte	1–2
2016	First Round	Coastal Carolina	1–2
