= High Point Panthers men's soccer =

American college soccer team

- Founded: 1929; 97 years ago
- University: High Point University
- Athletic director: Dan Hauser
- Head coach: Zach Haines (6th season)
- Conference: Big South
- Location: High Point, North Carolina, US
- Stadium: Vert Stadium (capacity: 1,100)
- Nickname: Panthers
- Colors: Purple and white
Home	Away

NCAA tournament Round of 16
- 2025

NCAA tournament Round of 32
- 2020, 2022, 2025

NCAA tournament appearances
- 2018, 2020, 2022, 2023, 2025

Conference tournament championships
- 2020, 2022, 2023, 2025

Conference Regular Season championships
- 2010, 2017, 2018, 2020, 2023, 2024

The High Point Panthers men's soccer team is the soccer team that represents High Point University in High Point, North Carolina, United States. The school's team currently competes in the Big South Conference.

== Roster ==
As of 1 Oct 2024

Note: Flags indicate national team as defined under FIFA eligibility rules; some limited exceptions apply. Players may hold more than one non-FIFA nationality.

No.	Pos.	Nation	Player
0	GK	USA	Peter Morano
1	GK	USA	Josh Caron
2	MF	USA	Jackson Ruckman
3	DF	GHA	Josh Gomina
4	MF	USA	Jefferson Amaya
5	DF	USA	Lukas Kamrath
6	MF	ENG	Ross Johnstone
7	FW	ENG	Joe Ryder
8	MF	USA	Brendan Krueger
9	FW	USA	Kaya Ignacio
10	MF	USA	Anthony Ramirez
11	FW	USA	Frankie DeFrancesco
12	DF	USA	Beau Yantz

No.	Pos.	Nation	Player
13	GK	USA	Luke Snyder
14	FW	USA	Chris Niblock
15	DF	USA	Roman Holt
16	MF	USA	Aidan Abril
17	DF	USA	Angelo Paparoupas
18	FW	GHA	Alfred Baafi
19	FW	FRA	Celestin Blondel
20	MF	USA	Caleb Britt
21	DF	USA	James VandeHei
22	DF	USA	Nick Herb
23	DF	USA	John Killgore
24	DF	GHA	Mohammed Seidu

== Coaches ==
High Point has had eight head coaches since it reestablished its soccer program in 1971.

- Edgar Hartley (1929)
- Unknown (1930–1941)
- No team (1942–1970)
- Chuck Hartman (1971)
- Ray Alley (1972–74)
- Ken Chartier (1975–77)
- Woody Gibson (1978–97)
- Peter Broadley (1998–2006)
- Dustin Fonder (2007–14)
- EJ O’Keeffe (2015–2018)
- Zach Haines (2019–present)

== Seasons ==
Statistics overview
Season	Coach	Overall	Conference	Standing	Postseason
High Point (NCAA Division II independent schools) (1929–1997)
1929	Edgar Hartley	2–4–2			
1930	Carl Smith	3–3–2			
1931		1–5–0			
1932		2–3–1			
1933		4–3–0			
1934		7–0–1			
1935	Dick Culler	8–1–1			
1936		5–2–0			
1937	C. W. Martin	4–1–1			
1938		5–0–0			
1939		6–1–0			
1940		6–0–1			
1941		5–0–1			
1942–70	Soccer dropped due to World War II				
1971	Chuck Hartman	0–10–0			
1972	Ray Alley	1–11–0			
1973	Ray Alley	3–7–2			
1974	Ray Alley	11–1–2			
1975	Ken Chartier	8–5–1			
1976	Ken Chartier	12–6–0			
1977	Ken Chartier	9–6–0			
1978	Woody Gibson	5–11–0			
1979	Woody Gibson	8–5–2			
1980	Woody Gibson	13–6–0			
1981	Woody Gibson	10–6–2			
1982	Woody Gibson	9–7–2			
1983	Woody Gibson	9–7–1			
1984	Woody Gibson	12–6–2			
1985	Woody Gibson	12–6–1			
1986	Woody Gibson	9–7–1			
1987	Woody Gibson	14–5–1			
1988	Woody Gibson	13–4–2			
High Point (Carolinas Intercollegiate Athletic Conference) (1989–1997)
1989	Woody Gibson	15–4–0			
1990	Woody Gibson	10–6–1			
1991	Woody Gibson	12–7–1			
1992	Woody Gibson	13–7–1			
1993	Woody Gibson	5–9–3			
1994	Woody Gibson	7–9–1			
1995	Woody Gibson	6–9–3	3–5–2	8th	
1996	Woody Gibson	6–13–0	5–5–0	5th	
1997	Woody Gibson	12–6–1			
High Point (Big South Conference) (1998–Present)
1998	Woody Gibson	9–10–0	4–3–0		
1999	Peter Broadley	9–8–0	4–3–0	4th	
2000	Peter Broadley	9–10–1	3–4–0	6th	
2001	Peter Broadley	7–9–3	1–4–2	8th	
2002	Peter Broadley	4–13–1	1–5–1	7th	
2003	Peter Broadley	4–14–2	2–4–1	6th	
2004	Peter Broadley	7–12–1	2–5–0	8th	
2005	Peter Broadley	1–13–4	1–5–1	6th	
2006	Peter Broadley	6–10–4	3–3–0	6th	
2007	Dustin Fonder	5–14–1	1–5–0	6th	
2008	Dustin Fonder	9–8–3	4–2–2	4th	
2009	Dustin Fonder	9–7–2	5–1–2	2nd	
2010	Dustin Fonder	16–4–1	8–0–0	1st	
2011	Dustin Fonder	9–9–3	4–4–1	6th	
2012	Dustin Fonder	12–5–3	5–3–2	5th	
2013	Dustin Fonder	8–8–3	6–2–2	2nd	
2014	Dustin Fonder	10–8–2	6–2–1	3rd	
2015	EJ O’Keeffe	8–6–7	3–3–3	6th	
2016	EJ O’Keeffe	11–4–4	5–1–2	2nd	
2017	EJ O’Keeffe	10–5–4	7–1–0	1st	
2018	EJ O'Keeffe	13–2–2	7–0–1	1st	NCAA Tournament Appearance
2019	Zach Haines	13–7–0	7–1–0	2nd	
2020	Zach Haines	12–2–0	9–0–0	1st	NCAA Second Round
2021	Zach Haines	8–7–3	6–0–3	2nd	
2022	Zach Haines	11–5–5	5–0–3	2nd	NCAA Second Round
2023	Zach Haines	10–4–5	6–0–1	1st	NCAA Second Round
2024	Zach Haines	11–4–2	6–1–0	1st	
Total:		542–411–101			
National champion Postseason invitational champion Conference regular season champion Conference regular season and conference tournament champion Division regular season champion Division regular season and conference tournament champion Conference tournament champion
