= Winthrop Eagles =

- University: Winthrop University
- NCAA: Division I
- Conference: Big South (primary)
- Athletic director: Chuck Rey
- Location: Rock Hill, South Carolina
- Varsity teams: 17 (7 men's, 9 women's, 1 co-ed)
- Basketball arena: Winthrop Coliseum
- Baseball stadium: The Winthrop Ballpark
- Softball stadium: Terry Field
- Soccer stadium: Eagle Field
- Tennis venue: Winthrop Memorial Tennis Courts
- Outdoor track and field venue: Irwin Belk Complex
- Nickname: Eagles
- Colors: Garnet and gold
- Mascot: Big Stuff the Eagle
- Website: winthropeagles.com

The Winthrop Eagles are the intercollegiate athletics teams that represent Winthrop University, located in Rock Hill, South Carolina. Winthrop's 17 men's and women's teams compete at the National Collegiate Athletic Association (NCAA) Division I level as a member of the Big South Conference.

== History ==
Winthrop University was founded in 1886, but the school didn't become an NCAA Division I institution until 1987. It joined the Big South conference in 1983, the year the conference was established.

Many student athletes from WU have gone on to play professionally in the United States or abroad after their collegiate careers. A few of these figures include: Marco Reda (soccer), Kevin Slowey (baseball), Pam Barnett (golf), Xavier Cooks (basketball), and Michael Jenkins (basketball).

== Teams ==
Men's sports	Women's sports
Baseball	Basketball
Basketball	Cross country
Cross country	Golf
Golf	Lacrosse
Soccer	Soccer
Track and field	Softball
	Track and field
	Volleyball
Co-ed sports
eSports

=== Baseball ===
- Big South Tournament Championships (4): 1985, 1987, 1999, 2005
- Big South Regular Season Championships (5): 1995, 2001, 2014, 2017

=== Softball ===
- Big South Tournament Championships (6): 1987, 1989, 1990, 1991, 2007, 2008
- Big South Regular Season Championships (7): 1988, 1989, 1991, 2005, 2007, 2008, 2026

=== Men's Basketball ===
- Big South Tournament Championships (13): 1988, 1999, 2000, 2001, 2002, 2005, 2006, 2007, 2008, 2010, 2017, 2020, 2021
- Big South Regular Season Championships (11): 1999, 2002, 2003, 2005, 2006, 2007, 2008, 2016, 2017, 2020, 2021

=== Women's Basketball ===
- Big South Tournament Championships (1): 2014

=== Men's Cross Country ===
- Big South Championships (2): 1999, 2000

=== Women's Cross Country ===
- Big South Championships (0):

=== Esports ===
- Big South Championships (1):

=== Women's Golf ===
- Big South Championships (3): 1989, 1990, 1991

=== Men's Soccer ===
- Big South Tournament Championships (6): 2002, 2006, 2008, 2009, 2012, 2015
- Big South Regular Season Championships (5): 1987, 2002, 2006, 2008, 2015

=== Women's Soccer ===
- Big South Tournament Championships (0):
- Big South Regular Season Championships (3): 2006, 2010, 2011

=== Men's Tennis ===
- Big South Tournament Championships (7): 1997, 2004, 2005, 2006, 2010, 2014, 2015
- Big South Regular Season Championships (9): 1997, 2002, 2003, 2004, 2005, 2007, 2010, 2011, 2018

=== Women's Tennis ===
- Big South Tournament Championships (20): 1994, 1995, 1996, 1999, 2000, 2002, 2003, 2004, 2005, 2006, 2008, 2009, 2010, 2011, 2012, 2013, 2014, 2016, 2017, 2018
- Big South Regular Season Championships (19): 1994, 1995, 1996, 1999, 2000, 2002, 2003, 2004, 2005, 2006, 2007, 2008, 2009, 2011, 2012, 2013, 2016, 2017, 2018

=== Men's Track and Field ===
- Big South Tournament Championships (0):
- Big South Regular Season Championships (0):

=== Women's Track and Field ===
- Big South Tournament Championships (0):
- Big South Regular Season Championships (0):

=== Women's Lacrosse ===
- Big South Tournament Championships (2): 2015, 2016
- Big South Regular Season Championships (2): 2015, 2016

=== Women's Volleyball ===
- Big South Tournament Championships (6): 2002, 2003, 2004, 2005, 2006, 2019
- Big South Regular Season Championships (7): 1988, 2004, 2005, 2006, 2007, 2011, 2019

== NCAA Championships ==
Winthrop University has two team national championships awarded by the NCAA.

=== Esports ===
- 2021 League of Legends National Champions
- 2021 Rocket League National Champions

== NCAA statistical leaders ==
In the 2006–07 season, James Shuler (men's basketball) led the nation in highest single game free-throw percentage (100%, 18/18).

In the 2007–08 season, Michael Jenkins (men's basketball) led the nation in most three-point field goals made in a single game (12).

In the 2012–13 season, Diana Choibekova (women's basketball) led the nation in three-point field goal average (3.9 per game).

In the 2018–19 season, the men's basketball team led the nation in three-point field goals per game (12.4).

In the 2019–20 season, Chase Claxton (men's basketball) shot 81.2% to lead the nation in two-point shooting average.

In the 2019–20 season, the men's basketball team had 1388 rebounds to lead the nation in total rebounds.

In the 2020–21 season, Chandler Vaudrin (men's basketball) led the nation in triple-doubles at 3 in total.

In the 2023-24 season, the men's basketball team led the nation in free throw attempts per game.

== Olympics ==
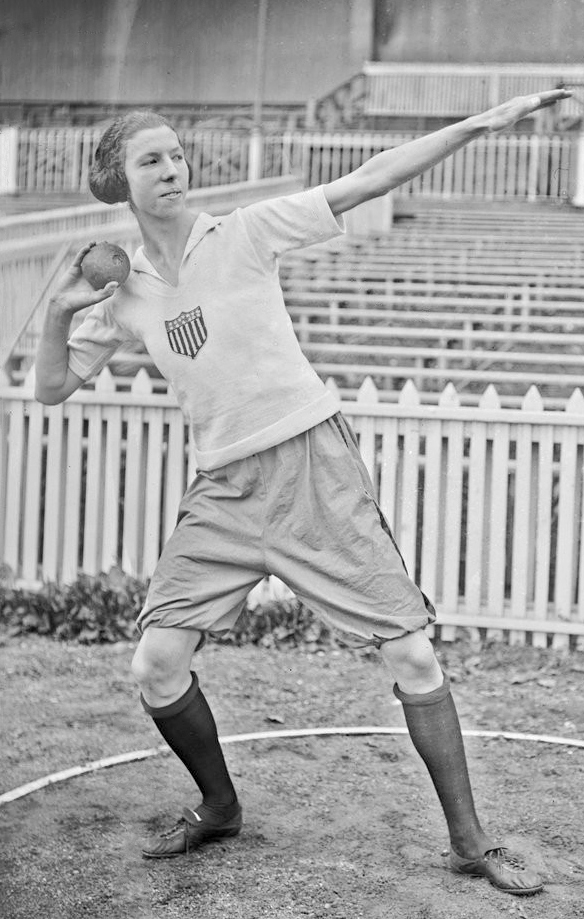
Lucille Godbold

Athlete	Sport	Location	Country	Medal(s)
Lucille Godbold	Track and field	1922 Paris (women's)	United States	Gold in shot put Bronze in javelin throw
Craig Bradshaw	Basketball	2004 Athens; 2008 Beijing	New Zealand	–

== Miscellaneous ==
- Mascot: Big Stuff (and Little Stuff)
- Chant: “Rock the Hill”
- Outfitter: Adidas
- Official craft brewery: Full Spectrum Brewing Company
- Rivalries: UNC Asheville, Coastal Carolina
- Radio network: 94.3 FM and 104.1 The Bridge
