= Presbyterian Blue Hose =

Intercollegiate sports teams of Presbyterian College

Coordinates: 34°27′52″N 81°52′12″W

- University: Presbyterian College
- Nickname: Blue Hose
- NCAA: Division I (FCS)
- Conference: Big South (primary); PFL (football); Southern (wrestling); NCATA (acrobatics and tumbling)
- Athletic director: Dee Nichols
- Location: Clinton, South Carolina
- Varsity teams: 19 (8 men's, 10 women's, 1 co-ed)
- Football stadium: Bailey Memorial Stadium
- Basketball arena: Ross E. Templeton Center
- Baseball stadium: PC Baseball Complex
- Softball stadium: PC Softball Complex
- Soccer stadium: Edens Field at Martin Stadium
- Colors: Blue and garnet
- Mascot: Scotty the Scotsman
- Fight song: "On P.C."
- Website: gobluehose.com

The Presbyterian Blue Hose are the athletic teams of Presbyterian College, located in Clinton, South Carolina, United States. The Blue Hose athletic program is a member of the Big South Conference and competes in the NCAA Division I Football Championship Subdivision (FCS). The PC Athletic Department fields a total of 19 varsity teams, eight men's and 11 women's sports. The school colors are garnet and blue, and the mascot is Scotty the Scotsman, a medieval Scottish warrior. The team name comes from the socks worn by the football team in the early days of the twentieth century.

== Sponsored sports ==
Presbyterian sponsors teams in eight NCAA-sanctioned sports for each sex, plus one women's sport that is not governed by the NCAA.

Men's sports	Women's sports
Baseball	Acrobatics and tumbling
Basketball	Basketball
Cross Country	Cross Country
Football	Golf
Golf	Lacrosse
Soccer	Soccer
Tennis	Softball
Wrestling	Tennis
	Volleyball
	Wrestling

In December 2017, Presbyterian announced the addition of men's and women's wrestling programs. The men's program debuted in 2018–19 as an independent and joined the Southern Conference in July 2019, joining Big South rivals Campbell and Gardner–Webb as SoCon affiliates since the Big South does not sponsor wrestling. The women's program is the first for an NCAA Division I school. The men's team began with a limited varsity schedule in 2018–19 and first played a full schedule in 2019–20, while the women's team began playing a full varsity schedule in 2018–19.

Mark Cody, former head coach of American and Oklahoma, was named to lead the Blue Hose. Presbyterian was the first South Carolina-based Division I school to sponsor wrestling since Clemson eliminated its program in 1995. Cassy Lopez of Maryland's Mt. Hebron High School was the first woman to sign a National Letter of Intent with a Division I wrestling program.

In 2021, Cody became the school's Director of Wrestling. Zach Sheaffer, an All-American with Pittsburgh, became the head coach of the men's and women's teams.

== Conference affiliations ==
Presbyterian is a member of the Big South Conference.

NAIA

- Carolinas Intercollegiate Athletic Conference – 1964–65 to 1971–72
- NAIA Independent – 1972–73 to 1988–89

NCAA Division II

- South Atlantic Conference – 1989–90 to 2006–07

NCAA Division I

- Big South Conference – 2007–08 to Present

== Facilities ==
Baseball: The PC Baseball Complex was built in the late 1980s.

Basketball: The Furman Pinson Arena in the Ross E. Templeton Center seats approximately 2300 and was opened in 1975.

Campus Golf: PC hosts a state of the art, 8 hole campus golf course located in the parking grounds of Bailey Memorial Stadium. Dubbed "The Links at Jeff E. Redwood" the layout was finalized in 2010 by famed golf course architect, Jeff E. Redwood. The crown jewel of the course is hole #4, commonly known as "Statue Hole". Pin locations vary from tree bases, to statues, and fire hydrants. The course is open to the public and no green fee is required.

Cross country does not compete on campus.

Football: Bailey Memorial Stadium opened in 2002, seating 6,500; play takes place on Claude Crocker field (natural grass). In 2021, football will make a transition to the Pioneer Football League

Golf: The Arnold Palmer-designed Musgrove Mill Golf Club is a championship course located at the site of the Revolutionary War Battle of Musgrove Mill and is host to Blue Hose home competitions. The golf teams also make use of the courses at Stoney Point Country Club and Lakeside Country Club.

Lacrosse: Old Bailey Stadium, the former home of PC football, opened in 1928. It now houses Blue Hose lacrosse on its Johnson Field. The stadium seats 3,000.

Soccer: Edens Field at Martin Stadium was built in 2000 and seats about 400.

Softball: PC Softball Complex, opened in 1997, has the main softball stadium, 3 practice fields, and batting cages.

Tennis: The Templeton Tennis Courts have 6 courts with bleacher seating located adjacent to the Templeton Center.

Volleyball and wrestling also compete in the arena at the Templeton Center.

The Blue Hose athletics program also has the Templeton Strength and Conditioning Weight Room and the Kemper D. Lake M.D. Sports Medicine Center with a staff of certified, professional athletic trainers for training and rehabilitation.
