= 2014 Clemson Tigers men's soccer team =

American college soccer season

2014 Clemson Tigers men's soccer

ACC Tournament, Champions

NCAA Tournament, Third Round
- Conference: Atlantic Coast Conference
- Record: 12–7–3 (5–2–1 ACC)
- Head coach: Mike Noonan (5th season)
- Assistant coaches: Phillip Jones (2nd season); Liam Curran (1st season)
- Home stadium: Riggs Field

2014 Atlantic Coast Conference men's soccer standings
	Conf.					Overall
Team	W		L		T	W		L		T
Atlantic
No. 10 Syracuse +	5	–	2	–	1	16	–	4	–	1
No. 11 Clemson ‡	5	–	2	–	1	12	–	7	–	3
Wake Forest +	5	–	3	–	0	10	–	7	–	2
No. 18 Louisville +	4	–	3	–	1	11	–	8	–	3
NC State	1	–	4	–	3	7	–	7	–	4
Boston College	1	–	6	–	1	5	–	8	–	3
Coastal
No. 9 Notre Dame +	6	–	1	–	1	12	–	5	–	4
No. 6 North Carolina +	5	–	2	–	1	15	–	5	–	2
Duke	4	–	4	–	0	9	–	9	–	1
No. 1 Virginia +	3	–	3	–	2	14	–	6	–	4
Virginia Tech	2	–	5	–	1	7	–	8	–	2
Pittsburgh	0	–	6	–	2	4	–	9	–	4
‡ - ACC Tournament champion + Invited to the NCAA Division I Men's Soccer Championship; As of December 16, 2014; Rankings from NSCAA

The 2014 Clemson Tigers men's soccer team was the college's 54th season of playing organized men's college soccer, and their 27th season playing in the Atlantic Coast Conference. The Tigers were led by fifth-year head coach Mike Noonan, and played their home games at Riggs Field.

== Roster ==
Accessed June 13, 2017

Note: Flags indicate national team as defined under FIFA eligibility rules; some limited exceptions apply. Players may hold more than one non-FIFA nationality.

No.	Pos.	Nation	Player
1	GK	USA	Michael Zierhoffer
2	DF	USA	Kyle Fisher
3	MF	USA	Bobby Belair
4	MF	ENG	Oliver Shannon
5	DF	BER	Mauriq Hill
6	MF	ENG	Paul Clowes
7	MF	NOR	Iman Mafi
8	MF	PUR	Manolo Sanchez
9	FW	CRC	Diego Campos
10	FW	USA	T. J. Casner
11	MF	USA	Amadou Dia
12	MF	CRC	Saul Chinchilla
13	MF	USA	Michael Melvin

No.	Pos.	Nation	Player
14	MF	USA	Grayson Raynor
15	MF	FRA	Alex Happi
16	MF	USA	John Cajka
17	MF	BRA	Thales Moreno
18	DF	RWA	Phanuel Kavita
19	FW	USA	Kyle Murphy
20	FW	USA	Austen Burnikel
21	MF	USA	Ara Amirkhanian
22	GK	USA	Andrew Tarbell
23	DF	USA	Joseph Amon
24	GK	USA	Chris Glodack
25	DF	USA	Chris Heijjer
27	MF	USA	Tyler Rider

== Draft picks ==
The Tigers had two players drafted in the 2015 MLS SuperDraft.

Player	Team	Round	Pick #	Position
(United States) Amadou Dia	Sporting Kansas City	1st	20th	DF
(Puerto Rico) Manolo Sanchez	New York Red Bulls	4th	79th	MF

== Schedule ==
Date Time, TV	Rank^{#}	Opponent^{#}	Result	Record	Site City, State
Exhibition
August 16*		UAB	W 2–0		Riggs Field; Clemson, SC
August 23*		UNC Asheville	W 2–0		Greenwood Soccer Field; Asheville, NC
Regular season
August 29*		Radford	W 1–0	1–0	Riggs Field (1,324); Clemson, SC
September 2*	No. 25	at South Carolina	L 1–2 ^{2OT}	1–1	Stone Stadium (3,555); Columbia, SC
September 5*		at San Diego State; San Diego State Tournament	L 1–2	1–2	SDSU Sports Deck (1,154); San Diego, CA
September 7*		vs. No. 17 UC Irvine; San Diego State Tournament	L 1–2	1–3	SDSU Sports Deck (106); San Diego, CA
September 12		at Boston College	W 2–0	2–3 (1–0)	Newton Soccer Complex (1,638); Newton, MA
September 14*		at Providence	W 2–1 ^{OT}	3–3	Hendricken Field (857); Providence, RI
September 17*		Gardner–Webb	W 6–0	4–3	Riggs Field (758); Clemson, SC
September 20		Syracuse	L 0–1	4–4 (1–1)	Riggs Field (1,528); Clemson, SC
September 26		Wake Forest	W 3–1	5–4 (2–1)	Riggs Field (3,084); Clemson, SC
October 3		at North Carolina	L 2–3 ^{2OT}	5–5 (2–2)	Fetzer Field (837); Chapel Hill, NC
October 7*		Charlotte	L 0–1	5–6	Riggs Field (1,359); Clemson, SC
October 11		at Pittsburgh	W 2–0	6–6 (3–2)	Ambrose Urbanic Field (357); Pittsburgh, PA
October 17		Virginia	W 2–1	7–6 (4–2)	Riggs Field (2,421); Clemson, SC
October 21*		Coastal Carolina	W 2–1 ^{OT}	8–6	Riggs Field (828); Clemson, SC
October 24		at Louisville	T 0–0 ^{2OT}	8–6–1 (4–2–1)	Lynn Stadium (4,318); Louisville, KY
October 28*		South Florida	W 3–0	9–6–1	Riggs Field (1,120); Clemson, SC
October 31		NC State	W 2–0	10–6–1 (5–2–1)	Riggs Field (1,414); Clemson, SC
ACC Tournament
November 9		Wake Forest	T 1–1 (PK 3–2) ^{2OT}	10–6–2	Riggs Field (2,096); Clemson, SC
November 14		vs. Notre Dame	T 1–1 (PK 5–4) ^{2OT}	10–6–3	WakeMed Soccer Park; Cary, NC
November 16		vs. Louisville	W 2–1 ^{2OT}	11–6–3	WakeMed Soccer Park (784); Cary, NC
NCAA Tournament
November 24*		Coastal Carolina	W 2–1	12–6–3	Riggs Field (2,570); Clemson, SC
November 30		North Carolina	L 1–2	12–7–3	Riggs Field (4,241); Clemson, SC
*Non-conference game. ^{#}Rankings from United Soccer Coaches. (#) Tournament seedings in parentheses.

== See also ==
- Clemson Tigers men's soccer
- 2014 Atlantic Coast Conference men's soccer season
- 2014 NCAA Division I men's soccer season
- 2014 ACC Men's Soccer Tournament
- 2014 NCAA Division I Men's Soccer Championship
