= 2014 Virginia Cavaliers men's soccer team =

American college soccer season

2014 Virginia Cavaliers men's soccer

ACC Tournament, Quarterfinal Loss, Notre Dame

NCAA tournament, Championship Win, UCLA
- Conference: Atlantic Coast Conference
- U. Soc. Coaches poll: No. 1
- TopDrawerSoccer.com: No. 1
- Record: 15–6–2 (3–3–2 ACC)
- Head coach: George Gelnovatch
- Home stadium: Klöckner Stadium

Uniform
Home	Away

2014 Atlantic Coast Conference men's soccer standings
	Conf.					Overall
Team	W		L		T	W		L		T
Atlantic
No. 10 Syracuse +	5	–	2	–	1	16	–	4	–	1
No. 11 Clemson ‡	5	–	2	–	1	12	–	7	–	3
Wake Forest +	5	–	3	–	0	10	–	7	–	2
No. 18 Louisville +	4	–	3	–	1	11	–	8	–	3
NC State	1	–	4	–	3	7	–	7	–	4
Boston College	1	–	6	–	1	5	–	8	–	3
Coastal
No. 9 Notre Dame +	6	–	1	–	1	12	–	5	–	4
No. 6 North Carolina +	5	–	2	–	1	15	–	5	–	2
Duke	4	–	4	–	0	9	–	9	–	1
No. 1 Virginia +	3	–	3	–	2	14	–	6	–	4
Virginia Tech	2	–	5	–	1	7	–	8	–	2
Pittsburgh	0	–	6	–	2	4	–	9	–	4
‡ - ACC Tournament champion + Invited to the NCAA Division I Men's Soccer Championship; As of December 16, 2014; Rankings from NSCAA

The 2014 Virginia Cavaliers men's soccer team was the college's 74th season of playing organized men's college soccer, and their 62nd season playing in the Atlantic Coast Conference.

After a mediocre season in ACC conference play and a quarterfinal exit from the ACC Men's Soccer Tournament, the Cavaliers made a deep run into the 2014 NCAA Division I Men's Soccer Championship where they ended up winning their seventh national title, defeating UCLA in penalty kicks.

== Roster ==
Number	Name	POS	HT	WT	Class	Hometown	High School
00	Jeff Caldwell	GK	6-3	185	FR	Todd, NC	Watauga
0	Cole Moffatt	GK	6-1	180	RS FR	South Pasadena, CA	Loyola
1	Spencer LaCivita	GK	6-1	178	RS JR	Raleigh, NC	Millbrook
2	Steven Gandy	D	5-11	175	FR	Gainesville, VA	Patriot
3	Matt Brown	D	6-1	165	SR	Charlotte, NC	South Mecklenburg
4	Grant Silvester	D	6-0	180	SR	Sacramento, CA	Rio Americano
5	Luc Fatton	M	6-0	150	RS FR	Charlottesville, VA	Albemarle
6	Scott Thomsen	M/D	5-10	165	JR	Brick, NJ	Christian Brothers Academy
7	Todd Wharton	M	6-0	175	JR	Glen Allen, VA	Deep Run
8	Pablo Aguilar	M	5-7	143	RS FR	Guatemala City, Guatemala	IMG Academy
9	Darius Madison	F	5-8	160	JR	Philadelphia, PA	LaSalle College HS
10	Nicko Corriveau	F/M	5-11	160	SO	Potomac, MD	Gonzaga
11	Eric Bird	M	5-11	170	SR	Virginia Beach, VA	Frank W. Cox
12	Riggs Lennon	F	6-1	175	SO	Paradise Valley, AZ	Brophy Prep
13	Kyler Sullivan	D	5-8	170	SR	Stafford, VA	North Stafford
15	Bryan Lima	F/M	5-6	155	RS SR	Boca Raton, FL	North Broward Prep
16	Marcus Salandy-Defour	F/M	5-9	160	JR	Kensington, MD	Georgetown Prep
17	Jake Rozhansky	M	5-8	140	FR	Germantown, MD	Montgomery Blair
18	Calle Brown	GK	6-5	200	RS SR	Leesburg, VA	Loudon County
19	Peter Pearson	M	5-6	155	FR	Virginia Beach, VA	Cape Henry
20	Patrick Foss	M	6-0	170	SO	South Riding, VA	U.S. Soccer Residency
21	Ryan Zinkhan	F	5-9	152	SR	Fredericksburg, VA	Riverbend
22	Kyle McCord	F	6-3	180	SR	Chester Springs, PA	Haverford
23	Will Hare	D	5-8	160	RS JR	Roanoke, VA	Hidden Valley
24	Matt Mills	M	5-10	155	SR	Greensboro, NC	Walter Hines Page
25	Nate Odusote	D	6-4	180	FR	North Haledon, NJ	Hawthorne Christian
26	Sam Hayward	F	6-0	165	SO	Dallas, TX	Highland Park
27	Manny Scere	F/D	6-0	180	FR	Roanoke, VA	Patrick Henry
29	Wesley Suggs	D	6-2	190	RS FR	Bowie, MD	DeMatha Catholic
30	Fabrice Shema	D	5-10	150	FR	Louisville, KY	Waggener
31	Sheldon Sullivan	D	5-9	160	RS FR	Stafford, VA	North Stafford
32	Julian Cummings	M	5-9	160	FR	Fredericksburg, VA	Stafford
33	Andrew Freschi	GK	6-2	205	JR	Atlanta, GA	Westminster
34	Liam Jenkins	M/D	6-3	195	FR	Richmond, VA	Mills Godwin

== Schedule ==
Date	Time	Opponent	Rank	Location	Result	Scorers	Attn.	Record	Ref.
Preseason exhibitions
August 16*	7:00 PM	Rutgers	—	Klockner Stadium • Charlottesville, VA	L 2–1	Lennon	748		
August 23*	1:00 PM	Georgetown	—	Klockner Stadium • Charlottesville, VA	T 1–1 ^{OT}	Lennon			
Regular season
August 29*	1:00 PM	#25 Old Dominion	#3	Klockner Stadium • Charlottesville, VA	W 1–0	Zinkhan	4,144	1–0	Box score
September 5*	8:30 PM	vs. Tulsa	#3	Hurricane Soccer and Track Stadium • Tulsa, OK; Hurricane Classic	L 1–0 ^{2OT}		2,234	1–1	Box score
September 7*	1:00 PM	vs. #18 UAB	#3	Hurricane Soccer and Track Stadium • Tulsa, OK; Hurricane Classic	W2–1	McCord, Hayward	155	2–1	Box score
September 12	8:00 PM	Virginia Tech	#15	Klockner Stadium • Charlottesville, VA; Commonwealth Clash	W 1–0	Thomsen	5,430	3–1 (1–0)	Box score
September 15*	7:00 PM	VCU	#15	Klockner Stadium • Charlottesville, VA; Piedmont Cup	W 1–0	Hayward	1,372	4–1 (1–0)	Box score
September 21	Noon	#5 Notre Dame	#7	Klockner Stadium • Charlottesville, VA	T 1–1 ^{2OT}	Bird	2,292	4–1–1 (1–0–1)	Box score
September 24*	7:00 PM	Davidson	#7	Klockner Stadium • Charlottesville, VA	L 2–1	Corriveau	1,014	4–2–1 (1–0–1)	Box score
September 27	7:00 PM	at Syracuse	#2	SU Soccer Stadium • Syracuse, NY	L 1–0		2,019	4–3–1 (1–1–1)	Box score
September 30	7:00 PM	James Madison	#19	Klockner Stadium • Charlottesville, VA	W 2–1 ^{OT}	Madison	1,309	5–3–1 (1–1–1)	Box score
October 4	7:00 PM	at Pittsburgh	#13	Ambrose Urbanic Field • Pittsburgh, PA	W 3–0	Wharton, Madison, Corriveau	472	6–3–1 (2–1–1)	Box score
October 7*	7:00 PM	at George Mason	#19	George Mason Stadium • Fairfax, VA	W 1–0	Bird	3,003	7–3–1 (2–1–1)	Box score
October 11	7:00 PM	Duke	#14	Klockner Stadium • Charlottesville, VA	W 1–0	Bird	2,396	8–3–1 (3–1–1)	Box score
October 17	6:00 PM	at Clemson	#6	Riggs Field • Clemson, SC	L 2–1	Bird	2,421	8–4–1 (3–2–1)	Box score
October 21*	7:00 PM	Radford	#22	Klockner Stadium • Charlottesville, VA	W 3–0	Suggs, Corriveau, Aguilar	1,305	9–4–1 (3–2–1)	Box score
October 24	6:30 PM	Wake Forest	#22	Klockner Stadium • Charlottesville, VA	L 2–1	Foss	3,146	9–5–1 (3–3–1)	Box score
November 1	7:00 PM	at #3 North Carolina	#21	Fetzer Field • Chapel Hill, NC	T 1–1	Bird	808	9–5–2 (3–3–2)	Box score
ACC Tournament
November 5	7:00 PM	Virginia Tech	#15	Klockner Stadium • Charlottesville, VA (ACC Tournament First Round)	W 1–0	Wharton	913	10–5–2	Box score
November 9	1:00 PM	at Notre Dame	#15	Alumni Stadium • Notre Dame, IN (ACC Tournament Quarterfinal)	L 3–0		507	10–6–2	Box score
NCAA Tournament
November 23*	1:00 PM	UNC Wilmington	#22	Klockner Stadium • Charlottesville, VA (NCAA Tournament Second Round)	W 3–1	Hayward, Rozhansky, McCord	677	11–6–2	Box score
November 30*	7:00 PM	#1 Notre Dame	#16	Alumni Stadium • Notre Dame, IN (NCAA Tournament Third Round)	W 1–0	Corriveau	412	12–6–2	Box score
December 6*	1:00 PM	Georgetown	#16	Shaw Field • Washington, D.C. (NCAA Tournament Quarterfinals)	T 1–1^{2OT} (5–4 p)	Wharton	2,232	12–6–3	Box score
December 12*	5:00 PM	UMBC	#16	WakeMed Soccer Park • Cary, NC (NCAA Tournament Semifinals)	W 1–0	Madison		13–6–3	
December 14*	Noon	#2 UCLA	#16	WakeMed Soccer Park • Cary, NC (NCAA Tournament Championship)	T 0–0^{2OT} (4–2 p)			13–6–4	
*Non-conference game. ^{#}Rankings from NCAA. All times are in Eastern Time.

== See also ==
- Virginia Cavaliers men's soccer
- 2014 Atlantic Coast Conference men's soccer season
- 2014 NCAA Division I men's soccer season
- 2014 ACC Men's Soccer Tournament
- 2014 NCAA Division I Men's Soccer Championship
