= 2014 Akron Zips men's soccer team =

Akron Zips
2014 season
- Head Coach: (United States) Jared Embick
- MAC Tournament: Semifinals
- NCAA Tournament: Third round
Home colors	Away colors

The 2014 Akron Zips men's soccer team represented The University of Akron during the 2014 NCAA Division I men's soccer season. It was the 65th season of the university fielding a program. The Zips entered the season as the two-time defending MAC Men's Soccer Tournament champions.

== Schedule ==
Date	Time	Opponent	Rank	Location	Result	Scorers	Attn.	Record	Ref.
Spring season
03/07/14	7:00 pm	at Cleveland State	—	Krenzler Field • Cleveland, OH	W 3–0	Najem, Sepe, Caso	351	1–0	
04/05/14	7:00 pm	at VCU	—	City Stadium • Richmond, VA	W 2–1	Casso, Sepe	644	2–0	
04/12/14	5:00 pm	Dayton	—	FirstEnergy Stadium • Akron, OH	L 1–2	Sepe	742	2–1	
04/19/14	11:00 am	Louisville	—	FirstEnergy Stadium • Akron, OH					
04/26/14	7:30 pm	at Xavier	—	XU Soccer Complex • Cincinnati, OH					
Preseason
08/18/14	7:00 pm	Maryland*	—	FirstEnergy Stadium • Akron, OH					
08/22/14	7:00 pm	Syracuse*	—	FirstEnergy Stadium • Akron, OH					
Regular season
08/29/14	9:00 pm	New Mexico*	—	UNM Soccer Complex • Albuquerque, NM					
09/04/14	7:30 pm	at South Florida*	—	Corbett Soccer Stadium • Tampa, FL					
09/06/14	7:30 pm	at Florida Gulf Coast*	—	FGCU Soccer Complex • Fort Myers, FL					
09/12/14	7:00 pm	UCF*	—	FirstEnergy Stadium • Akron, OH (The University of Akron Tournament)					
09/14/14	2:30 pm	Hartford*	—	FirstEnergy Stadium • Akron, OH					
09/20/14	7:00 pm	Tulsa*	—	FirstEnergy Stadium • Akron, OH					
09/24/14	7:00 pm	at Ohio State*	—	Owens Stadium • Columbus, OH					
09/30/14	7:00 pm	at Wake Forest*	—	Spry Stadium • Winston-Salem, NC					
10/04/14	7:00 pm	UAB*	—	FirstEnergy Stadium • Akron, OH					
10/07/14	3:00 pm	at Michigan State*	—	DeMartin Soccer Complex • East Lansing, MI					
MAC Tournament
11/14/14	TBA	TBD	—	TBD (Semifinals)					
11/16/14	TBA	TBD	—	TBD (MAC Championship)					
NCAA Tournament
*Non-conference game. #Rankings from NSCAA. All times are in Eastern Time. (#) during ACC or NCAA Tournament is seed.
