= 2014 Syracuse Orange men's soccer team =

American college soccer season

The 2014 Syracuse Orange men's soccer team represented Syracuse University during the 2014 NCAA Division I men's soccer season.

2014 Atlantic Coast Conference men's soccer standings
	Conf.					Overall
Team	W		L		T	W		L		T
Atlantic
No. 10 Syracuse +	5	–	2	–	1	16	–	4	–	1
No. 11 Clemson ‡	5	–	2	–	1	12	–	7	–	3
Wake Forest +	5	–	3	–	0	10	–	7	–	2
No. 18 Louisville +	4	–	3	–	1	11	–	8	–	3
NC State	1	–	4	–	3	7	–	7	–	4
Boston College	1	–	6	–	1	5	–	8	–	3
Coastal
No. 9 Notre Dame +	6	–	1	–	1	12	–	5	–	4
No. 6 North Carolina +	5	–	2	–	1	15	–	5	–	2
Duke	4	–	4	–	0	9	–	9	–	1
No. 1 Virginia +	3	–	3	–	2	14	–	6	–	4
Virginia Tech	2	–	5	–	1	7	–	8	–	2
Pittsburgh	0	–	6	–	2	4	–	9	–	4
‡ - ACC Tournament champion + Invited to the NCAA Division I Men's Soccer Championship; As of December 16, 2014; Rankings from NSCAA

== Standings ==
Team	Conference								Overall						
Team	Pld	W	L	T	GF	GA	GD	Pts	Pld	W	L	T	GF	GA	GD
Louisville	2	2	0	0	0	0	0	6	5	3	1	1	0	0	0
Virginia	1	1	0	0	0	0	0	3	5	4	1	0	0	0	0
Notre Dame	1	1	0	0	0	0	0	3	5	3	1	1	0	0	0
Syracuse	2	1	1	0	0	0	0	3	7	6	1	0	0	0	0
North Carolina	2	1	1	0	0	0	0	3	7	5	2	0	0	0	0
Duke	2	1	1	0	0	0	0	3	6	3	2	1	0	0	0
Virginia Tech	2	1	1	0	0	0	0	3	7	4	3	0	0	0	0
Clemson	2	1	1	0	0	0	0	3	8	4	4	0	0	0	0
Wake Forest	2	1	1	0	0	0	0	3	6	3	3	0	0	0	0
NC State	2	0	1	1	0	0	0	1	7	3	2	2	0	0	0
Pittsburgh	2	0	1	1	0	0	0	1	6	2	2	2	0	0	0
Boston College	2	0	2	0	0	0	0	0	7	3	3	1	0	0	0
Source: TheACC.com Rankings from NSCAA. Last updated 23 March 2014

(C) = ACC Tournament champion
Only applicable when the season is not finished:
(Q) = Qualified for the ACC Tournament, but not yet to the particular round indicated; (E) = Eliminated from tournament contention.

== Schedule ==
=== Spring season ===
Date	Time	Opponent	Rank	Location	Result	Scorers	Attendance	Record	Ref.
Spring exhibitions
03/07/14	2:00 pm	at Rochester Rhinos	—	Sahlen's Stadium • Rochester, NY	D 0–0	--	479	0–0–1	
03/29/14	3:00 pm	at Ottawa Fury	—	Harris Stadium • Ottawa, ON	D 2–2	Ekblom (2)	N/A	0–0–2	
04/05/14	2:00 pm	at St. John's	—	Belson Stadium • New York, NY	D 1–1	Lassiter		0–0–3	
04/12/14	1:00 pm	Siena	—	SU Soccer Stadium • Syracuse, NY	D 0–0			0–0–4	
04/12/14	2:30 pm	Buffalo	—	SU Soccer Stadium • Syracuse, NY	W 2–0	Rhynhart, Elkblom		1–0–4	
04/15/14	7:30 pm	Colgate	—	SU Soccer Stadium • Syracuse, NY					
04/15/14	8:30 pm	Herkimer	—	SU Soccer Stadium • Syracuse, NY					
Preseason
08/22/14	7:00 pm	at Akron*	—	FirstEnergy Stadium • Akron, OH					
Regular season
ACC Tournament
NCAA Tournament
*Non-conference game. #Rankings from NSCAA. All times are in Eastern Time. (#) during ACC or NCAA Tournament is seed.

== See also ==
- Syracuse Orange men's soccer
- 2014 Atlantic Coast Conference men's soccer season
- 2014 NCAA Division I men's soccer season
- 2014 ACC Men's Soccer Tournament
- 2014 NCAA Division I Men's Soccer Championship
