= 2014 Notre Dame Fighting Irish men's soccer team =

Notre Dame Fighting Irish
2014 season
- Manager: Bobby Clark
- Stadium: Alumni Stadium
- NCAA: 11–4–3
- ACC: 6–1–1
- ACC Tournament: Semifinal
- NCAA Tournament: Round of 16

The 2014 Notre Dame Fighting Irish men's soccer team represented the University of Notre Dame during the 2014 NCAA Division I men's soccer season. The Irish entered the season as the defending national champions.

2014 Atlantic Coast Conference men's soccer standings
	Conf.					Overall
Team	W		L		T	W		L		T
Atlantic
No. 10 Syracuse +	5	–	2	–	1	16	–	4	–	1
No. 11 Clemson ‡	5	–	2	–	1	12	–	7	–	3
Wake Forest +	5	–	3	–	0	10	–	7	–	2
No. 18 Louisville +	4	–	3	–	1	11	–	8	–	3
NC State	1	–	4	–	3	7	–	7	–	4
Boston College	1	–	6	–	1	5	–	8	–	3
Coastal
No. 9 Notre Dame +	6	–	1	–	1	12	–	5	–	4
No. 6 North Carolina +	5	–	2	–	1	15	–	5	–	2
Duke	4	–	4	–	0	9	–	9	–	1
No. 1 Virginia +	3	–	3	–	2	14	–	6	–	4
Virginia Tech	2	–	5	–	1	7	–	8	–	2
Pittsburgh	0	–	6	–	2	4	–	9	–	4
‡ - ACC Tournament champion + Invited to the NCAA Division I Men's Soccer Championship; As of December 16, 2014; Rankings from NSCAA

== 2014 squad ==
Note: Flags indicate national team as defined under FIFA eligibility rules; some limited exceptions apply. Players may hold more than one non-FIFA nationality.

No.	Pos.	Nation	Player
0	GK	USA	Max Hallwachs
1	GK	USA	Patrick Wall
2	DF	USA	Trevor Gonzales
3	MF	USA	Connor Klekota
4	DF	USA	Matt Habrowski
5	MF	USA	Brendan Lesch
6	DF	USA	Max Lachowecki
7	MF	USA	Danny Lojek
8	MF	USA	Nick Besler
9	FW	USA	Leon Brown
10	DF	USA	Brandon Aubrey
11	MF	USA	Oliver Harris
12	DF	USA	Andrew O'Malley
13	GK	USA	Chris Hubbard
14	MF	USA	Andrew Cupero

No.	Pos.	Nation	Player
15	MF	USA	Evan Panken
16	DF	USA	Michael Shipp
17	FW	IRL	Jon Gallagher
18	MF	USA	Robby Gallegos
19	MF	USA	Patrick Connolly
20	MF	USA	Blake Townes
21	FW	USA	Vince Cicciarelli
22	DF	USA	Luke Mishu
23	FW	USA	Jeffrey Farina
24	DF	USA	Mark Mishu
25	DF	USA	Patrick Berneski
26	MF	USA	Mark Gormley
27	MF	USA	Patrick Hodan
28	MF	USA	Kyle Dedrick
30	GK	USA	Brian Talcott

== Standings ==
Team	Conference								Overall						
Team	Pld	W	L	T	GF	GA	GD	Pts	Pld	W	L	T	GF	GA	GD
Louisville	2	2	0	0	0	0	0	6	5	3	1	1	0	0	0
Virginia	1	1	0	0	0	0	0	3	5	4	1	0	0	0	0
Notre Dame	1	1	0	0	0	0	0	3	5	3	1	1	0	0	0
Syracuse	2	1	1	0	0	0	0	3	7	6	1	0	0	0	0
North Carolina	2	1	1	0	0	0	0	3	7	5	2	0	0	0	0
Duke	2	1	1	0	0	0	0	3	6	3	2	1	0	0	0
Virginia Tech	2	1	1	0	0	0	0	3	7	4	3	0	0	0	0
Clemson	2	1	1	0	0	0	0	3	8	4	4	0	0	0	0
Wake Forest	2	1	1	0	0	0	0	3	6	3	3	0	0	0	0
NC State	2	0	1	1	0	0	0	1	7	3	2	2	0	0	0
Pittsburgh	2	0	1	1	0	0	0	1	6	2	2	2	0	0	0
Boston College	2	0	2	0	0	0	0	0	7	3	3	1	0	0	0
Source: TheACC.com Rankings from NSCAA. Last updated 23 March 2014

(C) = ACC Tournament champion
Only applicable when the season is not finished:
(Q) = Qualified for the ACC Tournament, but not yet to the particular round indicated; (E) = Eliminated from tournament contention.

== Schedule ==
Not released

== See also ==
- Notre Dame Fighting Irish men's soccer
- 2014 Atlantic Coast Conference men's soccer season
- 2014 NCAA Division I men's soccer season
- 2014 ACC Men's Soccer Tournament
- 2014 NCAA Division I Men's Soccer Championship
