= 2014 Oregon State Beavers men's soccer team =

Oregon State Beavers
2014 season
- Head Coach: Steve Simmons
- Stadium: Lorenz Field
- Pac-12: 5th
- NCAA Tournament: Second Round

2014 Pac-12 Conference men's soccer standings
	Conf.					Overall
Team	W		L		T	W		L		T
No. 16 Stanford ‡	6	–	1	–	3	13	–	3	–	3
No. 2 UCLA +	6	–	2	–	2	14	–	4	–	6
No. 12 Washington +	5	–	4	–	1	12	–	5	–	3
No. 15 California +	4	–	5	–	1	11	–	7	–	1
Oregon State +	4	–	5	–	1	12	–	8	–	1
San Diego State	1	–	9	–	0	7	–	12	–	0
‡-Conference champion + - Invited to the NCAA Division I Men's Soccer Championship; As of December 16, 2014; Rankings from NSCAA

The 2014 Oregon State Beavers men's soccer team represented Oregon State University during the 2014 NCAA Division I men's soccer season. The Beavers played in the Pac-12 Conference, and earned their first at-large bid into the NCAA Tournament since 2003.

== Roster ==
Note: Flags indicate national team as defined under FIFA eligibility rules; some limited exceptions apply. Players may hold more than one non-FIFA nationality.

No.	Pos.	Nation	Player
0	GK	(Canada) CAN	Nolan Wirth
1	GK	(United States) USA	Matt Bersano
2	DF	(United States) USA	Sam Tweeton
3	DF	(Canada) CAN	Eli Roubos
4	DF	(United States) USA	Jalen Markey
5	DF	(England) ENG	Will Seymore
6	MF	(Netherlands) NED	Phillip van Berkom
7	FW	(United States) USA	Jaime Velasco
8	MF	(United States) USA	Graham Smith
9	FW	(United States) USA	Timmy Mueller
10	MF	(United States) USA	Mikhail Doholis
11	MF	(United States) USA	Michael Steele
12	FW	(United States) USA	Jordan Jones

No.	Pos.	Nation	Player
13	DF	(United States) USA	Brenden Anderson
14	FW	(United States) USA	Khiry Shelton
15	FW	(United States) USA	Spencer Kleweno
16	DF	(United States) USA	CJ Brill
17	DF	(United States) USA	Rian Phillips
18	MF	(Guyana) GUY	Devonte Small
19	DF	(United States) USA	David Boldt
20	DF	(United States) USA	Matt Arbogast
21	MF	(United States) USA	Alex Segovia
22	FW	(United States) USA	Rolando Velazquez
23	DF	(United States) USA	Zach Striar
27	GK	(United States) USA	Ryan Vincent

== Schedule ==
Rankings reflect those of the NSCAA poll taken the week of the respective matches.

August 29, 2014 Nike Portland Invite	Oregon State Beavers	3–1	Evansville Purple Aces	Corvallis, Oregon, USA
19:30 (PDT)	van Berkom (yellow card) 27'; Shelton 36'; Mueller 47', 82'	Report	(yellow card) 23' Schroeder; 73' Gonzalez	Stadium: Paul Lorenz Field; Attendance: 654; Referee: Alex Robles

August 31, 2014 Nike Portland Invite	Oregon State Beavers	1–0	(18) Central Florida Knights	Corvallis, Oregon, USA
12:00 (PDT)	Shelton 27'; Mueller (yellow card) 30'; Seymore (yellow card) 52'	Report	(red card) 24' Ayala; (yellow card) 49' Gilpin	Stadium: Paul Lorenz Field; Attendance: 438; Referee: Lucas Brooks

September 05, 2014 Panther Invitational	(RV) UW-Milwaukee Panthers	0–2	(RV) Oregon State Beavers	Milwaukee, Wisconsin, USA
19:30 (CDT)	Stadler (yellow card) 44'; Stevenson (yellow card) 75'; Rodriguez (yellow card) 90'	Report	24' Jones; 29' Small	Stadium: Engelmann Field; Attendance: 368; Referee: Jamey Walter

September 07, 2014 Panther Invitational	(RV) Marquette Golden Eagles	1–0	(RV) Oregon State Beavers	Milwaukee, Wisconsin, USA
12:00 (CDT)	Selvaggi 4' (pen.); Nortey (yellow card) 26'; Navarro (yellow card) 78'	Report	(yellow card) 9' Smith	Stadium: Engelmann Field; Attendance: 520; Referee: Ben Trevino

September 12, 2014 OSU Hensor/Zaher Nike Classic	(RV) Oregon State Beavers	1–0	(RV) Siena Saints	Corvallis, Oregon, USA
19:00 (PDT)	Small 2'; Klewano (yellow card) 81'; Smith (yellow card) 81'	Report	(yellow card) 88' Antic	Stadium: Paul Lorenz Field; Attendance: 482; Referee: Oscar Rivas

September 14, 2014 OSU Hensor/Zaher Nike Classic	(RV) Oregon State Beavers	2–1	Duquesne Dukes	Corvallis, Oregon, USA
12:00 (PDT)	Small 33'; Mueller 58'; Doholis (yellow card) 89'	Report	31' (yellow card) 88' Pantohplet; (yellow card) 79' Lange	Stadium: Paul Lorenz Field; Attendance: 253; Referee: Greg Marshall

September 18, 2014	(RV) Oregon State Beavers	2–0	Portland Pilots	Corvallis, Oregon, USA
19:00 (PDT)	Anderson (yellow card) 37'; Mueller 39'; Shelton (yellow card) 55'; Jones 75'	Report	(yellow card) 48' Boggs	Stadium: Paul Lorenz Field; Attendance: 494; Referee: Drew Brooks

September 22, 2014	(RV) Oregon State Beavers	11–1	Northwest Christian Beacons	Corvallis, Oregon, USA
17:00 (PDT)	Doholis 15', 22'; Steele 29'; Jones 32', 82'; Tweeton 48'; Shelton 58', 62'; Velazquez 65'; Mueller 69', 78'	Report	68' Bramlett; (yellow card) 77' McMurrich	Stadium: Paul Lorenz Field; Attendance: 278; Referee: Jason Perlewitz

September 26, 2014	(RV) Seattle Redhawks	1–0	(24) Oregon State Beavers	Seattle, Washington, USA
19:00 (PDT)	Roldan 35'; Greene (yellow card) 61'	Report	(yellow card) 38' Steele; (yellow card) 73' Doholis; (yellow card) 83' Markey	Stadium: Championship Field; Attendance: 944; Referee: Timon Berry

October 2, 2014 Pac-12	(RV) Oregon State Beavers	0–1	(18) Stanford Cardinal	Corvallis, Oregon, USA
19:00 (PDT)	Smith (yellow card) 72'; Mueller (yellow card) 81'	Report	(yellow card) 68' Callinan; 89' Vincent	Stadium: Paul Lorenz Field; Attendance: 652; Referee: Daniel Radford

October 05, 2014 Pac-12	(RV) Oregon State Beavers	6–2	(13) California Golden Bears	Corvallis, Oregon, USA
15:00 (PDT)	Shelton 1', 64', 76'; Mueller 21', (yellow card) 80', (goal) 81', 81'	Report	54' Haberkorn; 59' Salcedo	Stadium: Paul Lorenz Field; Attendance: 525; Referee: Ali Hacock

October 12, 2014 Pac-12	(23) Oregon State Beavers	1–1 (a.e.t.)	(1) Washington Huskies	Corvallis, Oregon, USA
15:00 (PDT)	Mueller (yellow card) 51'; Seymore (yellow card) 72'; Jones 73'; Markey (red card) 106'	Report	(yellow card) 45' Clark; (red card) 58' Roldan; 64', (yellow card) 101' Wingo; (yellow card) 77' Blanchard; (yellow card) 104' Schmidt; (yellow card) 104' Reece; (red card) 106' Dismuke	Stadium: Paul Lorenz Field; Attendance: 876; Referee: Mohamed Ibrahaim

October 16, 2014 Pac-12	San Diego State Aztecs	1–0	(17) Oregon State Beavers	San Diego, California, USA
19:00 (PDT)	Olsen 53'; Kirshner (yellow card) 69'; Petit (yellow card) 85'	Report	(yellow card) 63' Seymore	Stadium: Sports Deck; Attendance: 327; Referee: Juan Guzman

October 19, 2014 Pac-12	(14) UCLA Bruins	3–0	(17) Oregon State Beavers	Los Angeles, California, USA
17:00 (PDT)	Danladi 30', 39'; Ndjock 69'; Torre (yellow card) 73'	Report	(yellow card) 47' Markey	Stadium: Drake Stadium; Attendance: 1,170; Referee: Alex Gorin

October 23, 2014 Pac-12	(RV) Oregon State Beavers	2–0	San Diego State Aztecs	Corvallis, Oregon, USA
14:00 (PDT)	Seymore 64'; Shelton 64'	Report	(red card) 67' Benamna	Stadium: Paul Lorenz Field; Attendance: 134; Referee: Josh Wilkins

October 26, 2014 Pac-12	(RV) Oregon State Beavers	1–2	(6) UCLA Bruins	Corvallis, Oregon, USA
11:00 (PDT)	Mueller 84'	Report	8' Tusaazemajja; (yellow card) 42' Contreras; 51' Ndjock	Stadium: Paul Lorenz Field; Attendance: 423; Referee: Tyler Pflueger

November 07, 2014 Pac-12	(7) California Golden Bears	3–4	Oregon State Beavers	Berkeley, California, USA
13:00 (PST)	Jalali 45'; Haberkorn (yellow card) 57'; Salcedo (yellow card) 71'; Sivakumar 74'; Bonomo 88'	Report	4' Shelton; 10', 59' Jones; (yellow card) 59' Andersen; (yellow card) 74' Bersano; 90' Mueller	Stadium: Edwards Stadium; Attendance: 251; Referee: Alex Gorin

November 09, 2014 Pac-12	(10) Stanford Cardinal	2–1	Oregon State Beavers	Stanford, California, USA
15:00 (PST)	Thompson (yellow card) 31'; Verso 67'; Baird (yellow card) 83', (goal) 84'; Gunn (yellow card) 84'	Report	78' (pen.) Seymore	Stadium: Cagen Stadium; Attendance: 1,776; Referee: Frank Anderson

November 16, 2014 Pac-12	(9) Washington Huskies	0–2	(RV) Oregon State Beavers	Seattle, Washington, USA
13:00 (PST)	Heard (yellow card) 15'; Thoma (yellow card) 88'	Report	36' Small; (yellow card) 63' Seymore; 74' Shelton	Stadium: Husky Soccer Stadium; Attendance: 1,158; Referee: Daniel Radford

November 20, 2014 NCAA First Round	(25) Oregon State Beavers	1–0	(RV) Denver Pioneers	Corvallis, Oregon, USA
17:00 (PST)	Jones 17'; Arbogast (yellow card) 90'	Report	(yellow card) 53' Kronenberg; (yellow card) 82' Hamilton; (yellow card) 90' Muuss	Stadium: Paul Lorenz Field; Attendance: 953; Referee: Chipalo Street

November 23, 2014 NCAA Second Round	(9) Creighton Bluejays	1–0	(25) Oregon State Beavers	Omaha, Nebraska, USA
12:30 (CST)	Stauffer 50'; Herbers (yellow card) 84'	Report		Stadium: Morrison Stadium; Attendance: 1275; Referee: Fotis Bazakos
