= List of North Carolina Tar Heels men's soccer seasons =

The North Carolina Tar Heels men's soccer team represents the University of North Carolina at Chapel Hill in men's NCAA Division I soccer competition. They compete in the Atlantic Coast Conference.

Since 1947, the university has fielded a men's varsity soccer team. Below is a list of seasons.

== Seasons ==
Year	Head coach	Overall (W-L-T)	ACC	ACC Tournament	NCAA Tournament
1947	Marvin Allen	6–3–0	1–1–0 (Southern Conference)*	N/A	N/A
1948	Marvin Allen	7–1–2	3–0–1 (Southern Conference)*	N/A	N/A
1949	Marvin Allen	6–3–0	5–1–0 (Southern Conference)*	N/A	N/A
1950	Marvin Allen	4–4–0	3–3–0 (Southern Conference)*	N/A	N/A
1951	Alan Moore	4–4–1	3–2–1 (Southern Conference)*	N/A	N/A
1952	Alan Moore	4–5–0	2–4–0 (Southern Conference)*	N/A	N/A
1953	Marvin Allen	3–4–1	0–3–1	N/A	N/A
1954	Marvin Allen	3–4–1	3–2–1	N/A	N/A
1955	Marvin Allen	4–2–2	3–1–2	N/A	N/A
1956	Marvin Allen	4–3–0	1–3–0	N/A	N/A
1957	Marvin Allen	2–3–2	0–2–2	N/A	N/A
1958	Marvin Allen	8–2–0	3–1–0	N/A	N/A
1959	Marvin Allen	10–1–0	3–1–0	N/A	DNQ
1960	Marvin Allen	8–3–0	2–2–0	N/A	DNQ
1961	Marvin Allen	8–4–0	2–2–0	N/A	DNQ
1962	Marvin Allen	7–2–0	3–1–0	N/A	DNQ
1963	Marvin Allen	5–3–2	1–1–2	N/A	DNQ
1964	Marvin Allen	5–2–2	2–1–1	N/A	DNQ
1965	Marvin Allen	8–3–0	3–1–0	N/A	DNQ
1966	Marvin Allen	7–2–1	3–1–0	N/A	DNQ
1967	Marvin Allen	10–2–0	4–1–0	N/A	DNQ
1968	Marvin Allen	8–3–0	3–2–0	N/A	First Round
1969	Marvin Allen	6–4–0	3–2–0	N/A	DNQ
1970	Marvin Allen	5–2–3	2–1–2	N/A	DNQ
1971	Marvin Allen	6–4–1	2–2–1	N/A	DNQ
1972	Marvin Allen	6–3–1	2–2–1	N/A	DNQ
1973	Marvin Allen	8–2–1	2–2–1	N/A	DNQ
1974	Marvin Allen	4–3–4	1–2–2	N/A	DNQ
1975	Marvin Allen	7–4–0	3–2–0	N/A	DNQ
1976	Marvin Allen	9–5–0	2–3–0	N/A	DNQ
1977	Anson Dorrance	14–3–1	4–1–0	N/A	DNQ
1978	Anson Dorrance	12–3–4	3–1–1	N/A	DNQ
1979	Anson Dorrance	16–3–5	3–1–1	N/A	DNQ
1980	Anson Dorrance	17–4–1	3–2–1	N/A	DNQ
1981	Anson Dorrance	15–6–0	3–3–0	N/A	DNQ
1982	Anson Dorrance	11–7–4	0–4–2	N/A	DNQ
1983	Anson Dorrance	16–3–2	2–3–1	N/A	DNQ
1984	Anson Dorrance	12–7–1	3–3–0	N/A	DNQ
1985	Anson Dorrance	12–8–1	3–3–0	N/A	DNQ
1986	Anson Dorrance	13–7–1	1–4–1	N/A	DNQ
1987	Anson Dorrance	20–5–0	3–3–0	Champions	Semifinals
1988	Anson Dorrance	14–9–1	3–3–0	Runner-Up	Second Round
1989	Elmar Bolowich	9–9–1	1–4–1	First Round	DNQ
1990	Elmar Bolowich	13–7–0	2–4–0	First Round	Second Round
1991	Elmar Bolowich	15–6–1	3–3–0	Semifinals	Second Round
1992	Elmar Bolowich	9–7–4	2–2–2	Semifinals	DNQ
1993	Elmar Bolowich	13–7–2	2–2–2	Semifinals	Second Round
1994	Elmar Bolowich	13–7–0	3–3–0	First Round	First Round
1995	Elmar Bolowich	11–8–1	0–5–1	Semifinals	DNQ
1996	Elmar Bolowich	8–8–1	2–3–1	First Round	DNQ
1997	Elmar Bolowich	6–13–0	1–5–0	First Round	DNQ
1998	Elmar Bolowich	11–6–2	3–3–0	First Round	DNQ
1999	Elmar Bolowich	12–7–1	2–3–1	Semifinals	First Round
2000	Elmar Bolowich	21–3–0	5–1–0	Champions	Quarterfinals
2001	Elmar Bolowich	21–4–0	4–2–0	Semifinals	Champions
2002	Elmar Bolowich	14–7–1	3–2–1	First Round	Second Round
2003	Elmar Bolowich	12–4–4	2–3–1	First Round	Second Round
2004	Elmar Bolowich	10–9–2	4–3–0	Semifinals	First Round
2005	Elmar Bolowich	17–4–3	3–3–2	Runner-Up	Quarterfinals
2006	Elmar Bolowich	11–6–3	3–4–1	First Round	Second Round
2007	Elmar Bolowich	7–8–5	3–5–0	Semifinals	DNQ
2008	Elmar Bolowich	15–8–1	3–5–0	First Round	Runner-Up
2009	Elmar Bolowich	16–2–4	5–2–1	Quarterfinals	Semifinals
2010	Elmar Bolowich	16–4–4	7–0–1	Finalist	Semifinals
2011	Carlos Somoano	21–2–3	5–1–2	Champions	Champions
2012	Carlos Somoano	16–4–3	6–1–1	Finalist	Third Round
2013	Carlos Somoano	9–6–5	4–2–5	First Round	Second Round
2014	Carlos Somoano	15–5–2	5–2–1	Quarterfinals	Third Round
2015	Carlos Somoano	15–2–3	6–1–1	Quarterfinals	Third Round
2016	Carlos Somoano	14–3–4	5–1–2	Quarterfinals	Semifinals
2017	Carlos Somoano	17–4–1	6–1–1	Quarterfinals	Semifinals
2018	Carlos Somoano	14–4–1	6–1–0	Finalist	Second Round
2019	Carlos Somoano	7–7–4	3–5–0	First Round	DNQ
2020	Carlos Somoano	9–5–4	7–2–3	Quarterfinals	Semifinals
2021	Carlos Somoano	11–7–2	4–4–0	Quarterfinals	Second Round
2022	Carlos Somoano	8–6–5	2–2–4	Quarterfinals	First Round
2023	Carlos Somoano	11–4–7	2–3–3	Finalist	Quarterfinals
2024	Carlos Somoano	9–4–5	4–3–1	First Round	First Round

* From 1947 to 1952 the Tar Heels competed in the Southern Conference, they joined the ACC in 1953

N/A-The NCAA Division I Men's Soccer Tournament did not exist until 1959, and the ACC Men's Soccer Tournament did not exist until 1987

DNQ-Did not qualify
