= 2014 ACC tournament =

2014 ACC tournament may refer to:

- 2014 ACC men's basketball tournament
- 2014 ACC women's basketball tournament
- 2014 ACC men's soccer tournament
- 2014 ACC women's soccer tournament
- 2014 Atlantic Coast Conference baseball tournament
- 2014 Atlantic Coast Conference softball tournament
