= 2014 Atlantic Coast Conference men's soccer season =

Atlantic Coast Conference
- Season: 2014
- Champions: Clemson Tigers (14th overall)
- Premiers: TBD
- NCAA Tournament: TBD

2014 Atlantic Coast Conference men's soccer standings
	Conf.					Overall
Team	W		L		T	W		L		T
Atlantic
No. 10 Syracuse +	5	–	2	–	1	16	–	4	–	1
No. 11 Clemson ‡	5	–	2	–	1	12	–	7	–	3
Wake Forest +	5	–	3	–	0	10	–	7	–	2
No. 18 Louisville +	4	–	3	–	1	11	–	8	–	3
NC State	1	–	4	–	3	7	–	7	–	4
Boston College	1	–	6	–	1	5	–	8	–	3
Coastal
No. 9 Notre Dame +	6	–	1	–	1	12	–	5	–	4
No. 6 North Carolina +	5	–	2	–	1	15	–	5	–	2
Duke	4	–	4	–	0	9	–	9	–	1
No. 1 Virginia +	3	–	3	–	2	14	–	6	–	4
Virginia Tech	2	–	5	–	1	7	–	8	–	2
Pittsburgh	0	–	6	–	2	4	–	9	–	4
‡ - ACC Tournament champion + Invited to the NCAA Division I Men's Soccer Championship; As of December 16, 2014; Rankings from NSCAA

The 2014 Atlantic Coast Conference men's soccer season was the 62nd season of men's varsity soccer in the conference. It marked the arrival of the Louisville Cardinals men's soccer program, who joined the ACC from the American Athletic Conference. The Maryland Terrapins men's soccer program, who were both the defending regular season and tournament champions, departed the conference for the Big Ten Conference.

== Changes from 2013 ==
- Louisville will be joining the conference, and will also be opening the new Dr. Mark and Cindy Lynn Stadium, a 5,300-seat on-campus facility.
- Maryland will be leaving the conference for the Big Ten.
- The ACC adopted a divisional format (Atlantic and Coastal) similar to what they did for other sports, allowing for regular season division winners to be recognized as well. All full-time members were in their respective divisions, while Notre Dame was assigned to the Coastal Division to balance the conference at six teams apiece in each division.

== Teams ==
=== Stadiums and locations ===
Team	Location	Stadium	Capacity
Boston College Eagles	Boston, Massachusetts	Newton Soccer Complex	2,000
Clemson Tigers	Clemson, South Carolina	Riggs Field	6,500
Duke Blue Devils	Durham, North Carolina	Koskinen Stadium	4,500
Louisville Cardinals	Louisville, Kentucky	Dr. Mark & Cindy Lynn Stadium	5,300
Notre Dame Fighting Irish	South Bend, Indiana	Alumni Stadium	3,000
NC State Wolfpack	Raleigh, North Carolina	Dail Field	1,500
North Carolina Tar Heels	Chapel Hill, NC	Fetzer Field	6,000
Pittsburgh Panthers	Pittsburgh, Pennsylvania	Urbanic Field	735
Syracuse Orange	Syracuse, New York	SU Soccer Stadium	1,500
Virginia Cavaliers	Charlottesville, Virginia	Klöckner Stadium	8,000
Virginia Tech Hokies	Blacksburg, Virginia	Thompson Field	2,500
Wake Forest Demon Deacons	Winston-Salem, North Carolina	Spry Stadium	3,000

=== Personnel ===
Team	Head coach	Captain	Shirt supplier
Boston College Eagles	(Republic of Ireland) Ed Kelly	(United States) Matt Wendelken	(United States) Under Armour
Clemson Tigers	(United States) Mike Noonan	(United States) Kyle Fisher	(United States) Nike
Duke Blue Devils	(United States) John Kerr, Jr.	(United States) Nick Palodichuk	(United States) Nike
Louisville Cardinals	(United States) Ken Lolla	(United States) Daniel Keller	(Germany) Adidas
Notre Dame Fighting Irish	(Scotland) Bobby Clark	(United States) Nick Besler	(Germany) Adidas
NC State Wolfpack	(United States) Kelly Findley	(France) Clement Simonin	(Germany) Adidas
North Carolina Tar Heels	(Guatemala) Carlos Somoano	(United States) Andy Craven	(United States) Nike
Pittsburgh Panthers	(United States) Joe Luxbacher	(England) Chris Davis	(United States) Nike
Syracuse Orange	(England) Ian McIntyre	(United States) Jordan Murrell	(United States) Nike
Virginia Cavaliers	(United States) George Gelnovatch	(United States) Todd Wharton	(United States) Nike
Virginia Tech Hokies	(United States) Mike Brizendine	(United States) Brad Vorv	(United States) Nike
Wake Forest Demon Deacons	(United States) Jay Vidovich	(United States) Sam Fink	(United States) Nike

== ACC Tournament ==
The 2014 ACC Men's Soccer Tournament, was held from November 5–16, 2014. 1st round and quarterfinal games were held at campus sites based on higher seed, while the semifinals and finals were held at WakeMed Soccer Park in Cary, North Carolina. The Clemson Tigers won the tournament to earn their 3rd ACC tournament championship and first since 2001. The tournament win also accounted for the Tigers' 14th official ACC championship, as the Tigers had won 11 conference titles in regular season play prior to the start of the ACC tournament in 1987.

== NCAA tournament ==
Seven ACC teams earned bids to the 2014 NCAA Division I Men's Soccer Tournament, led by defending national champion Notre Dame earning the #1 seed in the tournament. The Virginia Cavaliers, #16 seed in the tournament, would eventually win their 7th National Championship as a program and first since 2009.

Team	National Seed	Round Eliminated	Results
Notre Dame	#1	Round of 16	2nd Round: def. Ohio State 2–1; Round of 16: lost #16 Virginia 1–0
Clemson	#7	Round of 16	2nd Round: def. Coastal Carolina 2–1; Round of 16: lost North Carolina 2–1
Syracuse	#9	Round of 16	2nd Round: def. Penn State 2–1; Round of 16: lost Georgetown 2–1 (OT)
Louisville	#13	Round of 16	2nd Round: def. St. Louis 2–1; Round of 16: lost UMBC 1–0
Virginia	#16	National Champions	2nd Round: def. UNC-Wilmington 3–1; Round of 16: def #1 Notre Dame 1–0; Quarterfinals: tied Georgetown 2–2 (OT) - advance on PK; Semifinals: def. UMBC 1–0; Finals: tied #2 UCLA 0–0 (2OT) - won PK
North Carolina	N/A	Quarterfinals	1st Round: def. James Madison 6–0; 2nd Round: def. #10 Charlotte 2–1; Round of 16: def. #7 Clemson 2–1; Quarterfinals: tied #2 UCLA 3–3 (2OT) - UCLA advance on PK
Wake Forest	N/A	1st Round	tied UMBC 0–0 (2OT) - UMBC advance on PK

== See also ==
- Atlantic Coast Conference
- 2014 ACC Men's Soccer Tournament
- 2014 NCAA Division I men's soccer season
- 2014 in American soccer
