= Lissek =

Lissek is a surname. Notable people with the surname include:

- Jacob Lissek (born 1992), American soccer player
- Leon Lissek (1939–2022), British actor
- Sven Lissek (born 1992), German footballer
