= 2013 Pac-12 Conference men's soccer season =

Pac-12 Conference
- Season: 2013
- Champions: TBD
- Premiers: TBD
- NCAA Tournament: TBD

The 2013 Pac-12 Conference men's soccer season was the 14th season of men's varsity soccer in the conference.

The defending champions are the UCLA Bruins.

== Teams ==
=== Stadia and locations ===
Team	Location	Stadium	Capacity
California Golden Bears	Berkeley, California	Edwards Stadium	22,000
Oregon State Beavers	Corvallis, Oregon	Lorenz Field	2,200
San Diego State Aztecs	San Diego, California	SDSU Sports Deck	1,000
Stanford Cardinal	Stanford, California	Cagan Stadium	4,000
UCLA Bruins	Los Angeles, California	Drake Stadium	7,000
Washington Huskies	Seattle, Washington	Husky Soccer Stadium	1,640
Bakersfield Runners	Bakersfield, California	Main Soccer Field	1,700

== Standings ==
School	Overall Rec.	Conf. Rec.	Pts.
#3 Washington	111-0-4	4-0-2	14
#1 California	10-1-2	4-0-1	13
#4 UCLA	7-3-4	2-1-3	9
Stanford	7-4-2	1-3-1	4
San Diego St.	4-8-1	1-4-1	4
Oregon St.	7-6-2	0-4-2	2

As of October 25, 2013

== Results ==
Home/Away	CAL	OSU	SDSU	STA	UCLA	UW
California Golden Bears						
Oregon State Beavers						
San Diego State Aztecs						
Stanford Cardinal						
UCLA Bruins						
Washington Huskies						

== Honors ==
=== 2013 Pac-12 Men’s Soccer Players of the Week ===
Week	Player	School
Sept. 3	Steven Birnbaum	CAL
Sept. 10	Taylor Peay	WASH
Sept. 17	Leo Stolz	UCLA
Sept. 24	Drew Hutchins	STAN
Oct. 1	Jordan Morris	STAN
Oct. 8	Taylor Peay	WASH
Oct. 15	Stefano Bonomo	CAL
Oct. 22	Cristian Roldan	WASH

== See also ==
- 2014 Pac-12 Conference men's soccer season
