= 2014 ACC men's soccer tournament =

Soccer tournament

Tournament details
- Country: United States
- Teams: 10

Final positions
- Champions: Clemson
- Runners-up: Louisville

Tournament statistics
- Matches played: 9

2014 Atlantic Coast Conference men's soccer standings
| | Conf. | | | | | Overall |
| Team | W | | L | | T | W | | L | | T |
|---|---|---|---|---|---|---|---|---|---|---|
Atlantic
| No. 10 Syracuse + | 5 | – | 2 | – | 1 | 16 | – | 4 | – | 1 |
| No. 11 Clemson ‡ | 5 | – | 2 | – | 1 | 12 | – | 7 | – | 3 |
| Wake Forest + | 5 | – | 3 | – | 0 | 10 | – | 7 | – | 2 |
| No. 18 Louisville + | 4 | – | 3 | – | 1 | 11 | – | 8 | – | 3 |
| NC State | 1 | – | 4 | – | 3 | 7 | – | 7 | – | 4 |
| Boston College | 1 | – | 6 | – | 1 | 5 | – | 8 | – | 3 |
Coastal
| No. 9 Notre Dame + | 6 | – | 1 | – | 1 | 12 | – | 5 | – | 4 |
| No. 6 North Carolina + | 5 | – | 2 | – | 1 | 15 | – | 5 | – | 2 |
| Duke | 4 | – | 4 | – | 0 | 9 | – | 9 | – | 1 |
| No. 1 Virginia + | 3 | – | 3 | – | 2 | 14 | – | 6 | – | 4 |
| Virginia Tech | 2 | – | 5 | – | 1 | 7 | – | 8 | – | 2 |
| Pittsburgh | 0 | – | 6 | – | 2 | 4 | – | 9 | – | 4 |
‡ - ACC Tournament champion + Invited to the NCAA Division I Men's Soccer Championship; As of December 16, 2014; Rankings from NSCAA

The 2014 Atlantic Coast Conference men's soccer tournament was the 28th edition of the ACC Men's Soccer Tournament. The tournament decided the Atlantic Coast Conference champion and guaranteed representative into the 2014 NCAA Division I Men's Soccer Championship.

== Qualification ==
The top ten teams in the Atlantic Coast Conference earned a berth into the ACC Tournament. The play-in and quarterfinal rounds were held at the higher seed's home field. The semifinals and championship were held at WakeMed Soccer Park in Cary, North Carolina.

== Bracket ==
Preliminary Round
8 | Virginia | 1
9 | Virginia Tech | 0
7 | Duke (OT) | 3
10 | NC State | 2

Quarterfinals
1 | Notre Dame | 3
8 | Virginia | 0
4 | Clemson (pen.) | 1 (3)
5 | Wake Forest | 1 (2)
3 | North Carolina | 0
6 | Louisville | 1
2 | Syracuse | 2
7 | Duke | 0

Semifinals
1 | Notre Dame | 1 (4)
4 | Clemson (pen.) | 1 (5)
2 | Syracuse | 1
6 | Louisville | 2

Championship
4 | Clemson (2OT) | 2
6 | Louisville | 1

== Schedule ==
=== Play-in round ===
| November 5, 2014 | Virginia Cavaliers | 1–0 | Virginia Tech Hokies | Charlottesville, Virginia |
| 7:00 p.m. EST | Wharton 55' (pen.) | Report | | Stadium: Klöckner Stadium; Attendance: 913; Referee: Carmen Serbio |

| November 5, 2014 | Duke Blue Devils | 3–2 (a.e.t.) | NC State Wolfpack | Durham, North Carolina |
| 7:00 p.m. EST | White 62'; Palodichuk 90'; Eggleston 107' | Report | Hachem 48'; Fender 88' | Stadium: Koskinen Stadium; Attendance: 819; Referee: Mike Stutt |

=== Quarterfinals ===
| November 9, 2014 | Notre Dame Fighting Irish | 3–0 | Virginia Cavaliers | Notre Dame, Indiana |
| 1:00 p.m. EST | Brown 28'; Aubrey 35'; Hodan 59' | Report | | Stadium: Alumni Stadium; Attendance: 507; Referee: Keith Angel |

| November 9, 2014 | Clemson Tigers | 1–1 (a.e.t.) (3–2 p) | Wake Forest Demon Deacons | Clemson, South Carolina |
| 1:00 p.m. EST | Diego Campos 61' | Report | Amaduo Dia 54' (o.g.) | Stadium: Riggs Field; Attendance: 2,096; Referee: John McCloskey |
| | Penalties |
| | Ara Amirkhanian (penalty scored); Diego Campos (penalty missed); Thales Moreno (penalty scored); Paul Clowes (penalty missed); Manolo Sanchez (penalty scored) | | (penalty missed) Fink; (penalty missed) Bakero; (penalty scored) Partain; (penalty scored) Harkes; (penalty missed) Echevarria |

| November 9, 2014 | North Carolina | 0–1 | Louisville Cardinals | Chapel Hill, North Carolina |
| 1:00 p.m. EST | | Report | Gutierrez 76' | Stadium: Fetzer Field; Attendance: 2,127 |

| November 9, 2014 | Syracuse Orange | 2–0 | Duke Blue Devils | Syracuse, New York |
| 1:00 p.m. EST | Halis 10'; Perera 33' | Report | | Stadium: SU Soccer Stadium; Attendance: 2,533; Referee: Mohammad Samadpour |

=== Semi-finals ===
| November 14, 2014 | Notre Dame Fighting Irish | 1–1 (a.e.t.) (4–5 p) | Clemson Tigers | Cary, North Carolina |
| 5:30 p.m. EST | Brown 26' | Report | Bobby Belair 88' | Stadium: WakeMed Soccer Park; Referee: Fotis Bazakos |
| | Penalties |
| | Hodan (penalty scored); Gallagher (penalty missed); Farina (penalty missed); Besler (penalty scored); Aubrey (penalty scored); Brown (penalty scored); Lesch (penalty missed) | | Kyle Fisher (penalty scored); Manolo Sanchez (penalty scored); Phanuel Kavita (penalty missed); Diego Campos (penalty missed); Ara Amirkhanian (penalty scored); Bobby Belair (penalty scored); T. J. Casner (penalty scored) |

| November 14, 2014 | Syracuse Orange | 1–2 | Louisville Cardinals | Cary, North Carolina |
| 8:00 p.m. EST | Hall 76' | | Vitalis 41'; Velazco 64' | Stadium: WakeMed Soccer Park; Attendance: 1,243; Referee: Mark Kadlecik |

=== ACC Championship ===
| November 16, 2014 | Clemson Tigers | 2–1 (a.e.t.) | Louisville Cardinals | Cary, North Carolina |
| 2:00 p.m. ET | Paul Clowes 89'; Ara Amirkhanian 104' | | Velazco 12' | Stadium: WakeMed Soccer Park; Attendance: 784; Referee: Fotis Bazakos |

== Statistical leaders ==
Note: Statistics only for tournament games.

=== Top scorers ===
| Rank | Player | School | Goals |
|---|---|---|---|
| 1 | Leon Brown | Notre Dame | 2 |
| 1 | Alex Halis | Syracuse | 2 |
| 1 | Ricardo Velazco | Louisville | 2 |
| 2 | Ara Amirkanian | Clemson | 1 |
| 2 | Brandon Aubrey | Notre Dame | 1 |
| 2 | Bobby Belair | Clemson | 1 |
| 2 | Diego Campos | Clemson | 1 |
| 2 | Paul Clowes | Clemson | 1 |
| 2 | Nat Eggleston | Duke | 1 |
| 2 | Holden Fender | NC State | 1 |
| 2 | Ivan Gutierrez | Louisville | 1 |
| 2 | Yanni Hachem | NC State | 1 |
| 2 | Patrick Hodan | Notre Dame | 1 |
| 2 | Nick Palodichuk | Duke | 1 |
| 2 | Nick Perea | Syracuse | 1 |
| 2 | Todd Wharton | Virginia | 1 |
| 2 | Brian White | Duke | 1 |
| 2 | Will Vitalis | Louisville | 1 |

=== Most assists ===
| Rank | Player | School | Assists |
|---|---|---|---|
| 1 | Sean Davis | Duke | 2 |
| 2 | Bryson Asher | Duke | 1 |
| 2 | Michael Bajza | NC State | 1 |
| 2 | Matt Ingram | NC State | 1 |
| 2 | Brian White | Duke | 1 |

== See also ==
- Atlantic Coast Conference
- 2014 Atlantic Coast Conference men's soccer season
- 2014 NCAA Division I men's soccer season
- 2014 NCAA Division I Men's Soccer Championship
