= 2014 North Carolina Tar Heels men's soccer team =

The 2014 North Carolina Tar Heels men's soccer team represented the University of North Carolina at Chapel Hill during the 2014 NCAA Division I men's soccer season.

== Standings ==
Team	Conference								Overall						
Team	Pld	W	L	T	GF	GA	GD	Pts	Pld	W	L	T	GF	GA	GD
Louisville	2	2	0	0	0	0	0	6	5	3	1	1	0	0	0
Virginia	1	1	0	0	0	0	0	3	5	4	1	0	0	0	0
Notre Dame	1	1	0	0	0	0	0	3	5	3	1	1	0	0	0
Syracuse	2	1	1	0	0	0	0	3	7	6	1	0	0	0	0
North Carolina	2	1	1	0	0	0	0	3	7	5	2	0	0	0	0
Duke	2	1	1	0	0	0	0	3	6	3	2	1	0	0	0
Virginia Tech	2	1	1	0	0	0	0	3	7	4	3	0	0	0	0
Clemson	2	1	1	0	0	0	0	3	8	4	4	0	0	0	0
Wake Forest	2	1	1	0	0	0	0	3	6	3	3	0	0	0	0
NC State	2	0	1	1	0	0	0	1	7	3	2	2	0	0	0
Pittsburgh	2	0	1	1	0	0	0	1	6	2	2	2	0	0	0
Boston College	2	0	2	0	0	0	0	0	7	3	3	1	0	0	0
Source: TheACC.com Rankings from NSCAA. Last updated 23 March 2014

(C) = ACC Tournament champion
Only applicable when the season is not finished:
(Q) = Qualified for the ACC Tournament, but not yet to the particular round indicated; (E) = Eliminated from tournament contention.

== Schedule ==
Date	Time	Opponent	Rank	Location	Result	Scorers	Attn.	Record	Ref.
Spring Season
02/22/14	5:00 pm	vs. Queen's	—	Manchester Meadows Park • Rock Hill, SC (Winthrop Tournament)	W 2–0	Walden, Valimaa	N/A	1–0–0	
02/22/14	7:00 pm	vs. South Carolina	—	Manchester Meadows Park • Rock Hill, SC (Winthrop Tournament)	W 2–1	Valimaa (2)	N/A	2–0–0	
03/02/14	3:00 pm	Sigma FC	—	Finley Field • Chapel Hill, NC	W 1–0	not reported		3–0–0	
03/02/14	12:00 pm	Sigma FC	—	Finley Field • Chapel Hill, NC	W 3–0	not reported		4–0–0	
03/22/14	10:00 am	Tobacco Road FC	—	Finley Field • Chapel Hill, NC	W 4–0			5–0–0	
03/22/14	5:00 pm	at Carolina RailHawks	—	WakeMed Soccer Park • Cary, NC	D 2–2	Engel, George	1,472	5–0–1	
03/29/14	5:00 pm	vs. Virginia	—	Bryan Park • Greensboro, NC (Greensboro Invitational)					
04/05/14	2:00 pm	at Maryland	—	Ludwig Field • College Park, MD					
04/12/14	5:00 pm	at Wake Forest	—	Spry Stadium • Winston-Salem, NC					
04/12/14	7:00 pm	at Wake Forest	—	Spry Stadium • Winston-Salem, NC					
Preseason
Regular season
ACC Tournament
NCAA Tournament

== See also ==
- North Carolina Tar Heels men's soccer
- 2014 Atlantic Coast Conference men's soccer season
- 2014 NCAA Division I men's soccer season
- 2014 ACC Men's Soccer Tournament
- 2014 NCAA Division I Men's Soccer Championship
