= 2014 UCLA Bruins men's soccer team =

UCLA Bruins
2014 season
- Head Coach: Jorge Salcedo
- Stadium: Drake Stadium
- Pac-12: TBD
Home colors	Away colors

The 2014 UCLA Bruins men's soccer team is the college's 79th season of playing organized men's college soccer, and their fifth season playing in the Pac-12 Conference. The Bruins ended the season as the No. 2 seed in the NCAA Championship tournament. They were defeated in the championship game by No. 16 seed Virginia in penalty kicks 4-2.

== Standings ==
2014 Pac-12 Conference men's soccer standings
	Conf.					Overall
Team	W		L		T	W		L		T
No. 16 Stanford ‡	6	–	1	–	3	13	–	3	–	3
No. 2 UCLA +	6	–	2	–	2	14	–	4	–	6
No. 12 Washington +	5	–	4	–	1	12	–	5	–	3
No. 15 California +	4	–	5	–	1	11	–	7	–	1
Oregon State +	4	–	5	–	1	12	–	8	–	1
San Diego State	1	–	9	–	0	7	–	12	–	0
‡-Conference champion + - Invited to the NCAA Division I Men's Soccer Championship; As of December 16, 2014; Rankings from NSCAA

== Schedule ==
Date	Time	Opponent	Rank	Location	Result	Scorers	Attn.	Record	Ref.
Spring exhibitions
03/10/14	3:00 pm	at Chivas USA	—	StubHub Center Track Field • Carson, CA	W 2–1	Lennon, Wharton		1–0–0	
Preseason
Regular season
NCAA Tournament

== See also ==
- UCLA Bruins men's soccer
- 2014 Pac-12 Conference men's soccer season
- 2014 NCAA Division I men's soccer season
- 2014 NCAA Division I Men's Soccer Championship
