= 2014 MAC men's soccer tournament =

Tournament details
- Country: United States
- Teams: 4

Final positions
- Champions: Akron
- Runners-up: Bowling Green

Tournament statistics
- Matches played: 3
- Goals scored: 11 (3.67 per match)

2014 Mid-American Conference men's soccer standings
	Conf.					Overall
Team	W		L		T	W		L		T
Akron ‡	4	–	1	–	0	13	–	6	–	2
West Virginia	3	–	1	–	1	11	–	7	–	1
Bowling Green	2	–	2	–	1	14	–	6	–	1
Western Michigan	2	–	2	–	1	8	–	7	–	4
Buffalo	1	–	2	–	2	5	–	10	–	2
Northern Illinois	0	–	4	–	1	3	–	9	–	5
‡ - Tournament champion + - Invited to the NCAA Division I Men's Soccer Championship; As of November 21, 2014; Rankings from NSCAA

The 2014 Mid-American Conference men's soccer tournament was the 21st edition of the four-team tournament. The tournament decided the Mid-American Conference champion and guaranteed representative into the 2014 NCAA Division I Men's Soccer Championship. The Akron Zips are the two-time defending champions.

== Qualification ==
Akron, West Virginia, Bowling Green and Western Michigan qualified for the tournament by having the best regular season conference records.

== Bracket ==
Semifinals
1	Akron	2
4	Western Michigan	1
3	West Virginia	1
2	Bowling Green	2^{ot}

MAC Championship
1	Akron	2
2	Bowling Green	1

== Schedule ==
=== Semifinals ===
November 14	West Virginia Mountaineers	3–2 ^{ot}	Bowling Green Falcons	Akron, Ohio
4:00 p.m. EST		Report		Stadium: FirstEnergy Stadium

November 14	Akron Zips	2–1	Western Michigan Broncos	Akron, Ohio
7:00 p.m. EST		Report		Stadium: FirstEnergy Stadium

=== Championship ===
November 16	Akron Zips	2–1	Bowling Green Falcons	Akron, Ohio
1:00 p.m. ET		Report		Stadium: FirstEnergy Stadium

== Tournament Best XI ==
- Clint Caso, Akron
- Sam Gainford, Akron
- Adam Najem, Akron
- Victor Souto, Akron
- Max Auden, Bowling Green
- Nick Landsberger, Bowling Green
- Jacob Roth, Bowling Green
- Andy Bevin, West Virginia
- Jamie Merriam, West Virginia
- Greg Timmer, Western Michigan
- Nick Wysong, Western Michigan
