= Kari Nicole Campos =

American soccer player (born 1996)

Personal information
- Full name: Kari Nicole Campos
- Birth name: Kari Nicole Johnston
- Date of birth: May 1, 1996 (age 30)
- Height: 5 ft 7 in (1.70 m)
- Position: Forward

College career
Years	Team	Apps	(Gls)
2014–2017	Virginia Tech Hokies	26	(1)

Senior career*
Years	Team	Apps	(Gls)
2021	Amazon Grimstad	18	(7)
2022	Mallbacken	26	(12)
2024	Alajuelense	–	(1)
- * Club domestic league appearances and goals as of June 12, 2024

Kari Nicole Campos (née Johnston; born May 1, 1996) is an American former professional soccer player. She played college soccer for the Virginia Tech Hokies and played professionally for Amazon Grimstad in Norway, Mallbacken in Sweden, and Alajuelense in Costa Rica. She is married to Costa Rican soccer player Diego Campos.

== Early life ==
Campos grew up in Midlothian, Virginia. She began playing soccer when she was four. In her senior season at Midlothian High School, she was named all-state after winning the 2014 regional title. Besides soccer, she also ran cross country and track in high school, receiving letters in all three sports. She played club soccer for the Richmond Kickers.

Campos played college soccer for the Virginia Tech Hokies between 2014 and 2017. She started all 18 games and scored one goal as a defender during her senior season, after making minimal appearances over her first three seasons.

== Career ==
Campos began her professional career with Norwegian First Division club Amazon Grimstad in the 2021 season. Her partner, Diego Campos, played for FK Jerv in the same city. On May 22, 2021, the 25-year-old scored her first professional goal in her Levermyr Stadion debut, a 1–0 win over Øvrevoll Hosle. She started all 18 league games for Amazon and finished as their joint top scorer with 7 goals, having converted to forward after playing defense in college.

The following January, Campos joined Swedish club Mallbacken for the 2022 season. Diego also moved to Sweden with Degerfors. She scored her first goal for the club in her Elitettan debut on April 3, 2022, as Mallbacken won 7–0 away against Rävåsen. On August 7, she scored twice in a 5–4 league win over Team TG, recording her second consecutive double and making it six goals in her previous five games. She finished the season as Mallbacken's top scorer with 12 goals in 26 games.

In January 2024, after a year unattached, Campos signed a one-year contract with Costa Rican Women's Premier Division club Alajuelense. Now-husband Diego joined the club's men's team at the same time, making them the first married couple to play together for Alajuelense. During the 2024 Clausura, she stayed involved with the team during her pregnancy as Alajuelense won their eighth consecutive league championship.

== Personal life ==
Campos is the daughter of Billy and Susie Johnston and has three siblings. She met fellow soccer player Diego Campos when they were in college. The couple married in December 2023. They welcomed a son in April 2025. Outside of soccer, Campos is also an artist.

== Honors ==
Alajuelense

- Costa Rican Women's Premier Division: Apertura 2024, Clausura 2024
