= 2014 Pac-12 Conference men's soccer season =

Pac-12 Conference
- Season: 2014
- Champions: Stanford
- NCAA Tournament: TBD

The 2014 Pac-12 Conference men's soccer season was the 15th season of men's varsity soccer in the conference. The defending champions are the UCLA Bruins.

Stanford won the title.

== Season outlook ==
=== Preseason rankings ===
This will be released in August 2014.

== Teams ==
=== Stadia and locations ===
| Team | Location | Stadium | Capacity |
|---|---|---|---|
| California Golden Bears | Berkeley, California | Edwards Stadium | 22,000 |
| Oregon State Beavers | Corvallis, Oregon | Lorenz Field | 2,200 |
| San Diego State Aztecs | San Diego, California | SDSU Sports Deck | 1,000 |
| Stanford Cardinal | Stanford, California | Cagan Stadium | 4,000 |
| UCLA Bruins | Los Angeles, California | Drake Stadium | 7,000 |
| Washington Huskies | Seattle, Washington | Husky Soccer Stadium | 1,640 |

== Standings ==
| School | Overall Rec. | Conf. Rec. | Pts. |
|---|---|---|---|
| #3 Washington | 11-0-4 | 4-0-2 | 14 |
| #1 California | 10-1-2 | 4-0-1 | 13 |
| #4 UCLA | 7-3-4 | 2-1-3 | 9 |
| Stanford | 7-4-2 | 1-3-1 | 4 |
| San Diego St. | 4-8-1 | 1-4-1 | 4 |
| Oregon St. | 7-6-2 | 0-4-2 | 2 |

As of October 25, 2013

== Results ==
| Home/Away | CAL | OSU | SDSU | STA | UCLA | UW |
|---|---|---|---|---|---|---|
| California Golden Bears | | | | | | |
| Oregon State Beavers | | | | | | |
| San Diego State Aztecs | | | | | | |
| Stanford Cardinal | | | | | | |
| UCLA Bruins | | | | | | |
| Washington Huskies | | | | | | |

== Honors ==
=== 2014 Pac-12 Men’s Soccer Players of the Week ===
| Week | Player | School |

== See also ==
- Pac-12 Conference
- 2014 NCAA Division I men's soccer season
- 2014 in American soccer
- 2013 Pac-12 Conference men's soccer season
