= Sven Lissek =

German footballer

Personal information
- Full name: Sven Lissek
- Date of birth: 1 March 1992 (age 34)
- Place of birth: Sexau, Germany
- Height: 1.85 m (6 ft 1 in)
- Position: Goalkeeper

Youth career
- 1996–2004: FC Sexau
- 2004–2011: SC Freiburg

Senior career*
Years	Team	Apps	(Gls)
2011–2012	SC Freiburg II	0	(0)
2012–2016	Furman Paladins	60	(0)
2016	FC Emmendingen	11	(0)
2016–2017	TSG Neustrelitz	10	(0)
Total		81	(0)
- * Club domestic league appearances and goals

Sven Lissek (born 1 March 1992) is a German former professional footballer who played as a goalkeeper.

== Youth ==
Lissek began playing for his local youth soccer team, FC Sexau, in 1996. He was recruited to play for the SC Freiburg youth team in 2004.

== Club career ==
=== SC Freiburg II ===
Lissek signed a contract with SC Freiburg II in 2012 after progressing through every age group of the SC Freiburg youth system.

=== Furman University ===
In 2012 Lissek moved to the United States to pursue a Bachelor's Degree in Economics at Furman University while playing for the Furman soccer team. His standout performances on the field as well as in the classroom earned him a spot on the NSCAA Academic All American Team in 2015. He collected 28 clean sheets in 60 starts and set a Southern Conference record for single season shutouts in 2015. Lissek received many accolades, including being named one of Top Drawer Soccer's "Top 10 goalkeepers in men's college soccer".

=== TSG Neustrelitz ===
After briefly playing for FC Emmendingen, Lissek signed a contract with TSG Neustrelitz on 3 July 2016.
