= 2014 NCAA Division I men's soccer season =

NCAA Division I
- Season: 2014
- Champions: Virginia
- Top goalscorer: 15 Goals; Neco Brett (RMU)
- Biggest home win: Oregon St. 11–1 NWCU (September 22)
- Biggest away win: Howard 0–7 GMason (August 29)
- Highest scoring: 12 Goals; Oregon St. 11–1 NWCU (September 22)
- Longest winning run: 9 games Charlotte (ended October 18)
- Longest unbeaten run: 11 games Rhode Island (ended November 2); Radford (ended October 21); Penn State (ended October 12); UC Davis (ended October 10)
- Longest winless run: 18 games Sacred Heart (current)
- Longest losing run: 13 games Presbyterian (current); VMI (current)
- Highest attendance: 14,345; Cal Poly @ UC Santa Barbara (October 25)
- Lowest attendance: Home field–47 Canisius @ Manhattan (October 25); Neutral field–18 Charleston vs. UCF @ Akron (September 14)

The 2014 NCAA Division I men's soccer season was the 56th season of NCAA championship men's college soccer. The regular season began in late August 2014 and continued into November 2014. The season culminated with the 2014 NCAA Division I Men's Soccer Championship in December 2014. There are 205 teams in men's Division I competition. The defending champions were the Notre Dame Fighting Irish who won its first NCAA soccer title by defeating the Maryland 2–1 in the 2013 College Cup. The season concluded with Virginia defeating UCLA 0–0 (4–2 PKs) to win its seventh NCAA soccer title.

== Changes from 2013 ==
=== Conference changes ===
- The Sun Belt Conference added men's soccer, absent since 1995, with three full member schools plus two ex-independent teams and a transfer from another conference joining the conference for 2014 as affiliate members.

=== New programs ===
- Utah Valley inaugurated the sport as a requirement for membership in the Western Athletic Conference.
- Pacific reinstated the sport, dormant since 1985, as a requirement for membership in the West Coast Conference.

=== Discontinued programs ===
None.

=== Conference realignment ===
| School | Previous Conference | New Conference |
|---|---|---|
| Appalachian State | Southern Conference | Sun Belt Conference |
| Belmont | Independent | Horizon League |
| Davidson | Southern Conference | Atlantic 10 Conference |
| East Tennessee State | Atlantic Sun Conference | Southern Conference |
| Elon | Southern Conference | Colonial Athletic Association |
| Georgia Southern | Southern Conference | Sun Belt Conference |
| Georgia State | Independent | Sun Belt Conference |
| Hartwick | Mid-American Conference | Sun Belt Conference |
| Howard | Independent | Sun Belt Conference |
| Incarnate Word | Independent | Western Athletic Conference |
| Louisville | American Athletic Conference | Atlantic Coast Conference |
| Maryland | Atlantic Coast Conference | Big Ten Conference |
| Mercer | Atlantic Sun Conference | Southern Conference |
| NJIT | Independent | Sun Belt Conference |
| Pacific | Dormant program | West Coast Conference |
| Rutgers | American Athletic Conference | Big Ten Conference |
| Tulsa | Conference USA | American Athletic Conference |
| Utah Valley | No program | Western Athletic Conference |
| VMI | Big South Conference | Southern Conference |

== Season overview ==
=== Pre-season polls ===
Several American soccer outlets posted their own preseason top 25 rankings of what were believed to be the strongest men's collegiate soccer teams entering 2014.

NSCAA
| Rank | Team |
|---|---|
| 1 | Notre Dame |
| 2 | Maryland |
| 3 | Virginia |
| 4 | UCLA |
| 5 | New Mexico |
| 6 | Washington |
| 7 | California |
| 8 | Connecticut |
| 9 | Georgetown |
| 10 | Michigan State |
| 11 | Wake Forest |
| 12 | Marquette |
| 13 | Akron |
| 14 | Louisville |
| 15 | Penn State |
| 16 | UC Irvine |
| 17 | Coastal Carolina |
| 18 | UC Santa Barbara |
| 19 | UMBC |
| 20 | Stanford |
| 21 | Wisconsin |
| 22 | North Carolina |
| 23 | Charlotte |
| 24 | Cal State Northridge |
| 25 | Navy |
| 25 | Old Dominion |

College Soccer News
| Rank | Team |
|---|---|
| 1 | Notre Dame |
| 2 | Virginia |
| 3 | Maryland |
| 4 | UCLA |
| 5 | Washington |
| 6 | Connecticut |
| 7 | New Mexico |
| 8 | North Carolina |
| 9 | Georgetown |
| 10 | California |
| 11 | Michigan State |
| 12 | Marquette |
| 13 | Louisville |
| 14 | Stanford |
| 15 | UC Santa Barbara |
| 16 | Wake Forest |
| 17 | Akron |
| 18 | Coastal Carolina |
| 19 | UC Irvine |
| 20 | UNBC |
| 21 | Charlotte |
| 22 | Penn State |
| 23 | Cal State Northridge |
| 24 | Clemson |
| 25 | Old Dominion |

Soccer America
| Rank | Team |
|---|---|
| 1 | UCLA |
| 2 | Notre Dame |
| 3 | Virginia |
| 4 | Washington |
| 5 | Maryland |
| 6 | Georgetown |
| 7 | Connecticut |
| 8 | New Mexico |
| 9 | Louisville |
| 10 | North Carolina |
| 11 | Marquette |
| 12 | Michigan State |
| 13 | Stanford |
| 14 | California |
| 15 | Penn State |
| 16 | Wake Forest |
| 17 | Coastal Carolina |
| 18 | UC Santa Barbara |
| 19 | Clemson |
| 20 | UC Irvine |
| 21 | UMBC |
| 22 | Charlotte |
| 23 | Akron |
| 24 | Creighton |
| 25 | Cal State Northridge |

Top Drawer Soccer
| Rank | Team |
|---|---|
| 1 | Notre Dame |
| 2 | UCLA |
| 3 | Maryland |
| 4 | Virginia |
| 5 | Washington |
| 6 | North Carolina |
| 7 | Connecticut |
| 8 | Michigan State |
| 9 | Wake Forest |
| 10 | Louisville |
| 11 | Georgetown |
| 12 | Stanford |
| 13 | New Mexico |
| 14 | Akron |
| 15 | UMBC |
| 16 | Cal State Northridge |
| 17 | Marquette |
| 18 | UC Irvine |
| 19 | Michigan |
| 20 | Navy |
| 21 | Delaware |
| 22 | Loyola Marymount |
| 23 | UC Santa Barbara |
| 24 | Duke |
| 25 | California |

College Sports Madness
| Rank | Team |
|---|---|
| 1 | Notre Dame |
| 2 | UCLA |
| 3 | Washington |
| 4 | Virginia |
| 5 | Maryland |
| 6 | North Carolina |
| 7 | Louisville |
| 8 | Georgetown |
| 9 | Stanford |
| 10 | New Mexico |
| 11 | Marquette |
| 12 | Akron |
| 13 | Connecticut |
| 14 | Wake Forest |
| 15 | Michigan State |
| 16 | UMBC |
| 17 | Penn State |
| 18 | Cal State Northridge |
| 19 | Coastal Carolina |
| 20 | South Florida |
| 21 | California |
| 22 | UAB |
| 23 | UC-Santa Barbara |
| 24 | Michigan |
| 25 | Duke |

== Regular season ==
=== #1 ===
Weekly NSCAA #1 ranked team
| Date | Team | Date | Team | Date | Team | Date | Team |
|---|---|---|---|---|---|---|---|
| August 6 (preseason) | Notre Dame | None until after season starts | | September 2 | UCLA | September 9 | UCLA |
| September 16 | North Carolina | September 23 | UCLA | September 30 | Notre Dame | October 7 | Washington |
| October 14 | Washington | October 21 | Notre Dame | October 28 | UCLA | November 4 | Syracuse |
| November 11 | Syracuse | November 18 | Stanford | None until after tournament | | December 16 | Virginia |

=== Standings ===
2014 America East Conference men's soccer standings
| | Conf. | | | | | Overall |
| Team | W | | L | | T | W | | L | | T |
|---|---|---|---|---|---|---|---|---|---|---|
| No. 4 UMBC ‡ | 6 | – | 0 | – | 1 | 14 | – | 6 | – | 4 |
| Hartford | 5 | – | 2 | – | 0 | 11 | – | 6 | – | 2 |
| UMass Lowell ^{#} | 4 | – | 2 | – | 1 | 8 | – | 9 | – | 1 |
| Binghamton | 3 | – | 4 | – | 0 | 5 | – | 14 | – | 1 |
| Vermont | 2 | – | 4 | – | 1 | 8 | – | 9 | – | 2 |
| Albany | 2 | – | 4 | – | 1 | 4 | – | 9 | – | 6 |
| New Hampshire | 2 | – | 5 | – | 0 | 6 | – | 10 | – | 1 |
| Stony Brook | 2 | – | 5 | – | 0 | 4 | – | 13 | – | 2 |
‡ - Tournament champion +- Invited to the NCAA Division I Men's Soccer Championship ^{#}-Ineligible (In transition); As of December 16, 2014; Rankings from NSCAA

2014 American Athletic Conference men's soccer standings
| | Conf. | | | | | Overall |
| Team | W | | L | | T | W | | L | | T |
|---|---|---|---|---|---|---|---|---|---|---|
| UConn | 6 | – | 1 | – | 1 | 10 | – | 6 | – | 3 |
| Tulsa ‡ | 5 | – | 2 | – | 1 | 11 | – | 6 | – | 3 |
| SMU | 4 | – | 2 | – | 2 | 10 | – | 6 | – | 2 |
| South Florida | 4 | – | 3 | – | 1 | 10 | – | 7 | – | 3 |
| Memphis | 3 | – | 4 | – | 1 | 9 | – | 7 | – | 2 |
| UCF | 1 | – | 3 | – | 4 | 2 | – | 10 | – | 6 |
| Cincinnati | 2 | – | 5 | – | 1 | 5 | – | 10 | – | 3 |
| Temple | 1 | – | 6 | – | 1 | 2 | – | 14 | – | 2 |
‡ - Tournament champion +- Invited to the NCAA Division I Men's Soccer Championship; As of November 21, 2014; Rankings from NSCAA

2014 Atlantic 10 Conference men's soccer standings
| | Conf. | | | | | Overall |
| Team | W | | L | | T | W | | L | | T |
|---|---|---|---|---|---|---|---|---|---|---|
| Rhode Island | 7 | – | 1 | – | 0 | 13 | – | 5 | – | 3 |
| No. 21 Saint Louis + | 5 | – | 1 | – | 2 | 14 | – | 5 | – | 2 |
| VCU | 4 | – | 1 | – | 3 | 7 | – | 8 | – | 5 |
| Davidson | 4 | – | 2 | – | 2 | 10 | – | 5 | – | 3 |
| George Mason | 4 | – | 2 | – | 2 | 11 | – | 4 | – | 5 |
| Dayton | 3 | – | 3 | – | 2 | 7 | – | 7 | – | 5 |
| LaSalle | 3 | – | 3 | – | 2 | 7 | – | 9 | – | 3 |
| Fordham ‡ | 3 | – | 3 | – | 2 | 8 | – | 9 | – | 4 |
| Duquesne | 3 | – | 4 | – | 1 | 8 | – | 7 | – | 3 |
| George Washington | 2 | – | 4 | – | 2 | 6 | – | 9 | – | 2 |
| Saint Joseph's | 2 | – | 5 | – | 1 | 7 | – | 7 | – | 4 |
| UMass | 2 | – | 5 | – | 1 | 3 | – | 14 | – | 1 |
| Saint Bonaventure | 0 | – | 8 | – | 0 | 1 | – | 15 | – | 0 |
‡ - Tournament champion +- Invited to the NCAA Division I Men's Soccer Championship; As of December 16, 2014; Rankings from NSCAA

2014 Atlantic Coast Conference men's soccer standings
| | Conf. | | | | | Overall |
| Team | W | | L | | T | W | | L | | T |
|---|---|---|---|---|---|---|---|---|---|---|
Atlantic
| No. 10 Syracuse + | 5 | – | 2 | – | 1 | 16 | – | 4 | – | 1 |
| No. 11 Clemson ‡ | 5 | – | 2 | – | 1 | 12 | – | 7 | – | 3 |
| Wake Forest + | 5 | – | 3 | – | 0 | 10 | – | 7 | – | 2 |
| No. 18 Louisville + | 4 | – | 3 | – | 1 | 11 | – | 8 | – | 3 |
| NC State | 1 | – | 4 | – | 3 | 7 | – | 7 | – | 4 |
| Boston College | 1 | – | 6 | – | 1 | 5 | – | 8 | – | 3 |
Coastal
| No. 9 Notre Dame + | 6 | – | 1 | – | 1 | 12 | – | 5 | – | 4 |
| No. 6 North Carolina + | 5 | – | 2 | – | 1 | 15 | – | 5 | – | 2 |
| Duke | 4 | – | 4 | – | 0 | 9 | – | 9 | – | 1 |
| No. 1 Virginia + | 3 | – | 3 | – | 2 | 14 | – | 6 | – | 4 |
| Virginia Tech | 2 | – | 5 | – | 1 | 7 | – | 8 | – | 2 |
| Pittsburgh | 0 | – | 6 | – | 2 | 4 | – | 9 | – | 4 |
‡ - ACC Tournament champion + Invited to the NCAA Division I Men's Soccer Championship; As of December 16, 2014; Rankings from NSCAA

2014 Atlantic Sun Conference men's soccer standings
| | Conf. | | | | | Overall |
| Team | W | | L | | T | W | | L | | T |
|---|---|---|---|---|---|---|---|---|---|---|
| Lipscomb | 4 | – | 1 | – | 1 | 12 | – | 4 | – | 1 |
| Florida Gulf Coast ‡ | 4 | – | 1 | – | 1 | 8 | – | 7 | – | 5 |
| Stetson | 4 | – | 2 | – | 0 | 8 | – | 7 | – | 2 |
| North Florida | 3 | – | 2 | – | 1 | 8 | – | 7 | – | 1 |
| USC Upstate | 2 | – | 4 | – | 0 | 4 | – | 10 | – | 1 |
| North'n Kentucky ^{#} | 1 | – | 4 | – | 1 | 6 | – | 10 | – | 4 |
| Jacksonville | 1 | – | 5 | – | 0 | 4 | – | 12 | – | 0 |
‡ - Tournament champion +- Invited to the NCAA Division I Men's Soccer Championship ^{#}-Ineligible (In transition); As of November 21, 2014; Rankings from NSCAA

2014 Big East Conference men's soccer standings
| | Conf. | | | | | Overall |
| Team | W | | L | | T | W | | L | | T |
|---|---|---|---|---|---|---|---|---|---|---|
| No. 7 Creighton + | 7 | – | 1 | – | 1 | 16 | – | 3 | – | 3 |
| No. 13 Xavier + | 6 | – | 1 | – | 2 | 15 | – | 6 | – | 2 |
| No. 5 Georgetown + | 6 | – | 2 | – | 1 | 14 | – | 4 | – | 5 |
| No. 3 Providence ‡ | 5 | – | 2 | – | 2 | 16 | – | 5 | – | 2 |
| Villanova | 3 | – | 4 | – | 2 | 8 | – | 8 | – | 3 |
| Marquette | 2 | – | 3 | – | 4 | 8 | – | 6 | – | 4 |
| Seton Hall | 2 | – | 4 | – | 3 | 5 | – | 7 | – | 5 |
| Butler | 2 | – | 5 | – | 2 | 6 | – | 7 | – | 5 |
| DePaul | 1 | – | 6 | – | 2 | 4 | – | 10 | – | 4 |
| Saint John's | 1 | – | 7 | – | 1 | 4 | – | 10 | – | 4 |
‡ - Tournament champion +- Invited to the NCAA Division I Men's Soccer Championship; As of December 16, 2014; Rankings from NSCAA

2014 Big South Conference men's soccer standings
| | Conf. | | | | | Overall |
| Team | W | | L | | T | W | | L | | T |
|---|---|---|---|---|---|---|---|---|---|---|
| Radford | 8 | – | 1 | – | 0 | 12 | – | 5 | – | 3 |
| No. 22 Coastal Carolina ‡ | 7 | – | 1 | – | 1 | 16 | – | 6 | – | 1 |
| Winthrop | 6 | – | 2 | – | 1 | 13 | – | 4 | – | 2 |
| High Point | 6 | – | 2 | – | 1 | 10 | – | 8 | – | 2 |
| Liberty | 6 | – | 3 | – | 0 | 11 | – | 6 | – | 1 |
| Longwood | 3 | – | 6 | – | 0 | 4 | – | 14 | – | 1 |
| UNC Asheville | 3 | – | 4 | – | 2 | 5 | – | 9 | – | 3 |
| Campbell | 2 | – | 7 | – | 0 | 5 | – | 13 | – | 0 |
| Gardner–Webb | 1 | – | 7 | – | 1 | 3 | – | 13 | – | 1 |
| Presbyterian | 0 | – | 9 | – | 0 | 1 | – | 14 | – | 0 |
‡ - Tournament champion +- Invited to the NCAA Division I Men's Soccer Championship; As of December 16, 2014; Rankings from NSCAA

2014 Big Ten Conference men's soccer standings
| | Conf. | | | | | Overall |
| Team | W | | L | | T | W | | L | | T |
|---|---|---|---|---|---|---|---|---|---|---|
| No. 19 Maryland ‡ | 5 | – | 2 | – | 1 | 13 | – | 6 | – | 3 |
| Ohio State + | 5 | – | 3 | – | 0 | 9 | – | 8 | – | 5 |
| Northwestern + | 4 | – | 1 | – | 3 | 9 | – | 4 | – | 6 |
| No. 23 Penn State + | 5 | – | 3 | – | 0 | 13 | – | 6 | – | 1 |
| No. 8 Michigan St. + | 4 | – | 2 | – | 2 | 12 | – | 5 | – | 6 |
| No. 17 Indiana + | 3 | – | 3 | – | 2 | 12 | – | 5 | – | 5 |
| Michigan | 3 | – | 3 | – | 2 | 6 | – | 9 | – | 3 |
| Rutgers | 1 | – | 6 | – | 1 | 6 | – | 12 | – | 1 |
| Wisconsin | 0 | – | 7 | – | 1 | 3 | – | 12 | – | 3 |
‡ - Tournament champion +- Invited to the NCAA Division I Men's Soccer Championship; As of December 16, 2014; Rankings from NSCAA

2014 Big West Conference men's soccer standings
| | Conf. | | | | | Overall |
| Team | W | | L | | T | W | | L | | T |
|---|---|---|---|---|---|---|---|---|---|---|
North
| UC Santa Barbara | 6 | – | 2 | – | 2 | 10 | – | 7 | – | 3 |
| UC Davis | 5 | – | 3 | – | 2 | 7 | – | 4 | – | 9 |
| Sacramento State | 4 | – | 5 | – | 1 | 6 | – | 11 | – | 3 |
| Cal Poly | 3 | – | 5 | – | 2 | 8 | – | 7 | – | 4 |
South
| UC Riverside | 4 | – | 3 | – | 3 | 5 | – | 10 | – | 4 |
| No. 14 UC Irvine + | 4 | – | 5 | – | 1 | 16 | – | 6 | – | 3 |
| Cal State Fullerton ‡ | 3 | – | 4 | – | 3 | 11 | – | 8 | – | 6 |
| CSU Northridge | 3 | – | 5 | – | 2 | 7 | – | 9 | – | 3 |
‡ - Tournament champion +- Invited to the NCAA Division I Men's Soccer Championship; As of December 16, 2014; Rankings from NSCAA

2014 Colonial Athletic Association men's soccer standings
| | Conf. | | | | | Overall |
| Team | W | | L | | T | W | | L | | T |
|---|---|---|---|---|---|---|---|---|---|---|
| Delaware | 5 | – | 2 | – | 1 | 12 | – | 5 | – | 1 |
| UNC Wilmington + | 5 | – | 2 | – | 1 | 12 | – | 3 | – | 2 |
| Hofstra | 5 | – | 2 | – | 1 | 10 | – | 6 | – | 3 |
| Elon | 4 | – | 2 | – | 2 | 9 | – | 6 | – | 4 |
| Northeastern | 4 | – | 3 | – | 1 | 8 | – | 10 | – | 1 |
| James Madison ‡ | 3 | – | 3 | – | 2 | 8 | – | 7 | – | 4 |
| William & Mary | 3 | – | 4 | – | 1 | 6 | – | 11 | – | 1 |
| Drexel | 1 | – | 6 | – | 1 | 5 | – | 10 | – | 3 |
| Charleston | 0 | – | 6 | – | 2 | 2 | – | 11 | – | 3 |
‡ - Tournament champion +- Invited to the NCAA Division I Men's Soccer Championship; As of November 3, 2014; Rankings from NSCAA

2014 Conference USA men's soccer standings
| | Conf. | | | | | Overall |
| Team | W | | L | | T | W | | L | | T |
|---|---|---|---|---|---|---|---|---|---|---|
| No. 20 Charlotte + | 6 | – | 1 | – | 1 | 14 | – | 4 | – | 1 |
| Kentucky + | 5 | – | 1 | – | 2 | 10 | – | 6 | – | 4 |
| UAB + | 5 | – | 3 | – | 0 | 11 | – | 7 | – | 2 |
| No. 24 Old Dominion ‡ | 4 | – | 3 | – | 1 | 13 | – | 7 | – | 1 |
| New Mexico | 4 | – | 4 | – | 0 | 11 | – | 6 | – | 1 |
| Marshall | 3 | – | 4 | – | 1 | 6 | – | 9 | – | 3 |
| South Carolina | 3 | – | 5 | – | 0 | 10 | – | 10 | – | 0 |
| Florida International | 2 | – | 6 | – | 0 | 6 | – | 9 | – | 1 |
| Florida Atlantic | 1 | – | 6 | – | 1 | 1 | – | 13 | – | 2 |
‡ - Tournament champion +- Invited to the NCAA Division I Men's Soccer Championship; As of December 16, 2014; Rankings from NSCAA

2014 Horizon League men's soccer standings
| | Conf. | | | | | Overall |
| Team | W | | L | | T | W | | L | | T |
|---|---|---|---|---|---|---|---|---|---|---|
| Oakland ‡ | 5 | – | 0 | – | 3 | 10 | – | 7 | – | 3 |
| Detroit | 6 | – | 2 | – | 0 | 9 | – | 7 | – | 4 |
| Wright State | 4 | – | 3 | – | 1 | 12 | – | 7 | – | 2 |
| Cleveland State | 4 | – | 4 | – | 0 | 6 | – | 12 | – | 1 |
| Valparaiso | 3 | – | 3 | – | 2 | 8 | – | 5 | – | 6 |
| Milwaukee | 3 | – | 3 | – | 2 | 6 | – | 10 | – | 3 |
| UIC | 3 | – | 4 | – | 1 | 7 | – | 8 | – | 2 |
| Green Bay | 2 | – | 5 | – | 1 | 6 | – | 9 | – | 3 |
| Belmont | 1 | – | 7 | – | 0 | 3 | – | 15 | – | 0 |
‡ - Tournament champion +- Invited to the NCAA Division I Men's Soccer Championship; As of November 24, 2014; Rankings from NSCAA

2014 Ivy League men's soccer standings
| | Conf. | | | | | Overall |
| Team | W | | L | | T | W | | L | | T |
|---|---|---|---|---|---|---|---|---|---|---|
| No. 25 Dartmouth ‡ | 5 | – | 1 | – | 1 | 12 | – | 5 | – | 2 |
| Princeton ‡x | 5 | – | 1 | – | 1 | 11 | – | 3 | – | 3 |
| Harvard | 4 | – | 1 | – | 2 | 11 | – | 4 | – | 2 |
| Brown | 2 | – | 3 | – | 2 | 5 | – | 6 | – | 6 |
| Penn | 2 | – | 3 | – | 2 | 6 | – | 9 | – | 2 |
| Columbia | 2 | – | 4 | – | 1 | 7 | – | 8 | – | 1 |
| Cornell | 3 | – | 4 | – | 0 | 10 | – | 6 | – | 1 |
| Yale | 0 | – | 6 | – | 1 | 1 | – | 13 | – | 3 |
‡-Conference Champions x- Not invited to the NCAA Division I Men's Soccer Championship; As of December 16, 2014; Rankings from NSCAA

2014 Metro Atlantic Athletic Conference men's soccer standings
| | Conf. | | | | | Overall |
| Team | W | | L | | T | W | | L | | T |
|---|---|---|---|---|---|---|---|---|---|---|
| Quinnipiac | 7 | – | 0 | – | 3 | 10 | – | 4 | – | 5 |
| Iona | 6 | – | 3 | – | 1 | 9 | – | 7 | – | 3 |
| Rider | 6 | – | 4 | – | 0 | 9 | – | 7 | – | 2 |
| Monmouth ‡ | 4 | – | 1 | – | 5 | 11 | – | 4 | – | 6 |
| Siena | 5 | – | 3 | – | 2 | 10 | – | 7 | – | 2 |
| Fairfield | 4 | – | 2 | – | 4 | 8 | – | 5 | – | 7 |
| Canisius | 4 | – | 4 | – | 2 | 9 | – | 6 | – | 3 |
| Marist | 3 | – | 5 | – | 2 | 7 | – | 7 | – | 4 |
| Niagara | 2 | – | 6 | – | 2 | 5 | – | 11 | – | 3 |
| Saint Peter's | 2 | – | 8 | – | 0 | 4 | – | 14 | – | 0 |
| Manhattan | 1 | – | 8 | – | 1 | 2 | – | 12 | – | 2 |
‡ - Tournament champion +- Invited to the NCAA Division I Men's Soccer Championship; As of November 21, 2014; Rankings from NSCAA

2014 Mid-American Conference men's soccer standings
| | Conf. | | | | | Overall |
| Team | W | | L | | T | W | | L | | T |
|---|---|---|---|---|---|---|---|---|---|---|
| Akron ‡ | 4 | – | 1 | – | 0 | 13 | – | 6 | – | 2 |
| West Virginia | 3 | – | 1 | – | 1 | 11 | – | 7 | – | 1 |
| Bowling Green | 2 | – | 2 | – | 1 | 14 | – | 6 | – | 1 |
| Western Michigan | 2 | – | 2 | – | 1 | 8 | – | 7 | – | 4 |
| Buffalo | 1 | – | 2 | – | 2 | 5 | – | 10 | – | 2 |
| Northern Illinois | 0 | – | 4 | – | 1 | 3 | – | 9 | – | 5 |
‡ - Tournament champion + - Invited to the NCAA Division I Men's Soccer Championship; As of November 21, 2014; Rankings from NSCAA

2014 Missouri Valley Conference men's soccer standings
| | Conf. | | | | | Overall |
| Team | W | | L | | T | W | | L | | T |
|---|---|---|---|---|---|---|---|---|---|---|
| Missouri State | 4 | – | 0 | – | 2 | 9 | – | 5 | – | 4 |
| SIU Edwardsville ‡ | 4 | – | 1 | – | 1 | 8 | – | 9 | – | 4 |
| Evansville | 4 | – | 2 | – | 0 | 6 | – | 11 | – | 1 |
| Drake | 3 | – | 3 | – | 0 | 5 | – | 11 | – | 3 |
| Loyola Chicago | 2 | – | 2 | – | 2 | 8 | – | 6 | – | 5 |
| Bradley | 1 | – | 5 | – | 0 | 9 | – | 11 | – | 0 |
| Central Arkansas | 0 | – | 5 | – | 1 | 2 | – | 13 | – | 1 |
‡ - MVC Tournament champion + - Invited to the NCAA Division I Men's Soccer Championship; As of November 23, 2014; Rankings from NSCAA

2014 Northeast Conference men's soccer standings
| | Conf. | | | | | Overall |
| Team | W | | L | | T | W | | L | | T |
|---|---|---|---|---|---|---|---|---|---|---|
| Saint Francis (PA) | 6 | – | 1 | – | 0 | 13 | – | 6 | – | 1 |
| Bryant | 5 | – | 0 | – | 2 | 9 | – | 5 | – | 3 |
| St. Francis Brooklyn ‡ | 4 | – | 1 | – | 2 | 11 | – | 6 | – | 4 |
| LIU Brooklyn | 4 | – | 3 | – | 0 | 5 | – | 12 | – | 0 |
| Robert Morris | 2 | – | 4 | – | 1 | 7 | – | 9 | – | 2 |
| Fairleigh Dickinson | 2 | – | 4 | – | 1 | 4 | – | 12 | – | 2 |
| Central Connecticut | 1 | – | 5 | – | 1 | 5 | – | 10 | – | 2 |
| Sacred Heart | 0 | – | 6 | – | 1 | 0 | – | 16 | – | 2 |
‡ - Tournament champion + - Invited to the NCAA Division I Men's Soccer Championship; As of November 21, 2014; Rankings from NSCAA

2014 Pac-12 Conference men's soccer standings
| | Conf. | | | | | Overall |
| Team | W | | L | | T | W | | L | | T |
|---|---|---|---|---|---|---|---|---|---|---|
| No. 16 Stanford ‡ | 6 | – | 1 | – | 3 | 13 | – | 3 | – | 3 |
| No. 2 UCLA + | 6 | – | 2 | – | 2 | 14 | – | 4 | – | 6 |
| No. 12 Washington + | 5 | – | 4 | – | 1 | 12 | – | 5 | – | 3 |
| No. 15 California + | 4 | – | 5 | – | 1 | 11 | – | 7 | – | 1 |
| Oregon State + | 4 | – | 5 | – | 1 | 12 | – | 8 | – | 1 |
| San Diego State | 1 | – | 9 | – | 0 | 7 | – | 12 | – | 0 |
‡-Conference champion + - Invited to the NCAA Division I Men's Soccer Championship; As of December 16, 2014; Rankings from NSCAA

2014 Patriot League men's soccer standings
| | Conf. | | | | | Overall |
| Team | W | | L | | T | W | | L | | T |
|---|---|---|---|---|---|---|---|---|---|---|
| Boston U. | 6 | – | 0 | – | 3 | 12 | – | 4 | – | 0 |
| Navy | 6 | – | 1 | – | 2 | 11 | – | 4 | – | 5 |
| American | 5 | – | 2 | – | 2 | 11 | – | 3 | – | 4 |
| Lehigh | 5 | – | 3 | – | 1 | 10 | – | 8 | – | 1 |
| Bucknell ‡ + | 4 | – | 3 | – | 2 | 10 | – | 10 | – | 3 |
| Army | 3 | – | 4 | – | 2 | 6 | – | 8 | – | 6 |
| Loyola (MD) | 2 | – | 5 | – | 2 | 5 | – | 8 | – | 2 |
| Colgate | 2 | – | 6 | – | 1 | 6 | – | 10 | – | 2 |
| Holy Cross | 2 | – | 6 | – | 1 | 5 | – | 9 | – | 3 |
| Lafayette | 2 | – | 7 | – | 0 | 6 | – | 10 | – | 2 |
‡ - Tournament champion + - Invited to the NCAA Division I Men's Soccer Championship; As of November 21, 2014; Rankings from NSCAA

2014 Southern Conference men's soccer standings
| | Conf. | | | | | Overall |
| Team | W | | L | | T | W | | L | | T |
|---|---|---|---|---|---|---|---|---|---|---|
| Mercer | 8 | – | 2 | – | 0 | 14 | – | 7 | – | 0 |
| Wofford | 7 | – | 2 | – | 1 | 11 | – | 6 | – | 1 |
| Furman ‡ | 5 | – | 4 | – | 1 | 12 | – | 5 | – | 5 |
| UNC Greensboro | 5 | – | 4 | – | 1 | 6 | – | 12 | – | 2 |
| East Tenn. State | 3 | – | 6 | – | 1 | 7 | – | 9 | – | 1 |
| VMI | 0 | – | 10 | – | 0 | 1 | – | 16 | – | 1 |
‡ - Tournament champion + - Invited to the NCAA Division I Men's Soccer Championship; As of November 24, 2014; Rankings from NSCAA

2014 The Summit League men's soccer standings
| | Conf. | | | | | Overall |
| Team | W | | L | | T | W | | L | | T |
|---|---|---|---|---|---|---|---|---|---|---|
| Denver ‡ | 3 | – | 2 | – | 1 | 11 | – | 8 | – | 1 |
| Western Illinois | 3 | – | 2 | – | 1 | 9 | – | 7 | – | 3 |
| Omaha # | 3 | – | 2 | – | 1 | 10 | – | 5 | – | 2 |
| Oral Roberts | 3 | – | 2 | – | 1 | 8 | – | 7 | – | 2 |
| Fort Wayne | 3 | – | 3 | – | 0 | 6 | – | 9 | – | 4 |
| IUPUI | 2 | – | 3 | – | 1 | 5 | – | 8 | – | 3 |
| Eastern Illinois | 1 | – | 4 | – | 1 | 3 | – | 13 | – | 1 |
‡ - Tournament champion + - Invited to the NCAA Division I Men's Soccer Championship # - Ineligibke (in transition); As of November 21, 2014; Rankings from NSCAA

2014 Sun Belt Conference men's soccer standings
| | Conf. | | | | | Overall |
| Team | W | | L | | T | W | | L | | T |
|---|---|---|---|---|---|---|---|---|---|---|
| Hartwick ‡ | 3 | – | 1 | – | 1 | 6 | – | 10 | – | 4 |
| Georgia State | 3 | – | 2 | – | 0 | 8 | – | 10 | – | 0 |
| Georgia Southern | 3 | – | 2 | – | 0 | 8 | – | 9 | – | 0 |
| NJIT | 2 | – | 3 | – | 0 | 7 | – | 7 | – | 4 |
| Appalachian State | 1 | – | 2 | – | 2 | 7 | – | 8 | – | 3 |
| Howard | 1 | – | 3 | – | 1 | 2 | – | 15 | – | 2 |
‡ - Tournament champion + - Invited to the NCAA Division I Men's Soccer Championship; As of November 21, 2014; Rankings from NSCAA

2014 West Coast Conference men's soccer standings
| | Conf. | | | | | Overall |
| Team | W | | L | | T | W | | L | | T |
|---|---|---|---|---|---|---|---|---|---|---|
| San Diego ‡ | 6 | – | 1 | – | 0 | 11 | – | 6 | – | 4 |
| Saint Mary's | 5 | – | 2 | – | 0 | 12 | – | 5 | – | 2 |
| San Francisco | 5 | – | 2 | – | 0 | 11 | – | 6 | – | 2 |
| Loyola Marymount | 3 | – | 1 | – | 3 | 9 | – | 4 | – | 6 |
| Gonzaga | 3 | – | 3 | – | 1 | 5 | – | 12 | – | 1 |
| Santa Clara | 2 | – | 4 | – | 1 | 6 | – | 9 | – | 4 |
| Pacific | 1 | – | 6 | – | 0 | 3 | – | 15 | – | 0 |
| Portland | 0 | – | 6 | – | 1 | 4 | – | 11 | – | 4 |
‡-Conference champion + - Invited to the NCAA Division I Men's Soccer Championship; As of November 24, 2014; Rankings from NSCAA

2014 Western Athletic Conference men's soccer standings
| | Conf. | | | | | Overall |
| Team | W | | L | | T | W | | L | | T |
|---|---|---|---|---|---|---|---|---|---|---|
| UNLV ‡ | 7 | – | 2 | – | 1 | 14 | – | 5 | – | 3 |
| Seattle | 6 | – | 2 | – | 2 | 11 | – | 5 | – | 3 |
| Incarnate Word ^{#} | 6 | – | 3 | – | 1 | 7 | – | 11 | – | 1 |
| Utah Valley | 5 | – | 3 | – | 2 | 9 | – | 7 | – | 2 |
| UMKC | 5 | – | 4 | – | 1 | 8 | – | 10 | – | 2 |
| San Jose State | 4 | – | 4 | – | 2 | 6 | – | 11 | – | 2 |
| Cal St. Bakersfield | 3 | – | 5 | – | 2 | 10 | – | 7 | – | 4 |
| Air Force | 3 | – | 6 | – | 1 | 7 | – | 7 | – | 4 |
| Grand Canyon ^{#} | 2 | – | 6 | – | 2 | 5 | – | 12 | – | 3 |
| Houston Baptist | 2 | – | 8 | – | 0 | 3 | – | 11 | – | 2 |
‡ - Tournament champion + - Invited to the NCAA Division I Men's Soccer Championship ^{#}-Ineligible (In transition); As of November 21, 2014; Rankings from NSCAA

=== Major upsets ===
In this list, a "major upset" is defined as a game won by a team ranked 10 or more spots lower or an unranked team that defeats a team ranked No. 15 or higher.

| Date | Winner | Score | Loser |
|---|---|---|---|
| August 29 | @ #14 Louisville | 1–0 | #2 Maryland |
| August 29 | @ #22 North Carolina | 3–1 | #7 California |
| August 31 | @ Indiana | 1–0 | #12 Marquette |
| September 5 | American | 2–1 ^{ot} @ New Mexico | #1 UCLA |
| September 5 | @ Tulsa | 2–1 ^{2ot} | #3 Virginia |
| September 6 | @ Memphis | 4–0 | #15 St. Louis |
| September 7 | Saint Mary's | 2–1 ^{ot} | @ #4 Washington |
| September 8 | Kentucky | 1–0 | @ #5 Notre Dame |
| September 8 | @ Navy | 2–1 | #10 Maryland |
| September 9 | @ Saint Louis | 1–0 | #5 Louisville |
| September 11 | VCU | 2–1 | @ #6 Georgetown |
| September 11 | Valparaiso | 1–0 | @ #7 Michigan State |
| September 12 | @ UNLV | 1–0 | #14 UMBC |
| September 12 | Furman | 1–0 | @ #13 Coastal Carolina |
| September 14 | @ Cal State Fullerton | 4–3 ^{2ot} | #14 UMBC |
| September 19 | @ Duke | 2–1 | #1 North Carolina |
| September 20 | #20 Saint Louis | 1–0 | @ #3 Creighton |
| September 21 | @ #24 Stanford | 2–1 | #11 Delaware |
| September 24 | Davidson | 2–1 | @ #2 Virginia |
| September 26 | @ San Diego | 1–0 | #1 UCLA |
| September 26 | @ #21 Charlotte | 2–0 | #5 New Mexico |
| September 27 | @ #18 Syracuse | 1–0 | #2 Virginia |
| September 27 | @ Lehigh | 2–1 | #14 American |
| September 30 | @ UNC Wilmington | 4–3 | #14 North Carolina |
| September 30 | Ohio State | 1–0 | @ #6 Louisville |
| October 3 | Boston College | 1–0 | @ #1 Notre Dame |
| October 3 | @ NC State | 2–1 | #6 Louisville |
| October 4 | @ UC Santa Barbara | 1–0 | #3 UC Irvine |
| October 5 | @ Oregon State | 6–2 | #13 California |
| October 7 | @ Michigan | 3–2 | # 6 Notre Dame |
| October 7 | @ George Mason | 1–2 | #14 Virginia |
| October 10 | @ #22 California | 3–2 ^{ot} | #2 UCLA |
| October 12 | @ Maryland | 4–0 | #3 Penn State |
| October 12 | @ George Mason | 3–2 | #13 Saint Louis |
| October 15 | Providence | 2–0 | @ #3 Georgetown |
| October 15 | @ Butler | 1–0 | #7 Marquette |
| October 17 | @ Louisville | 2–1 ^{ot} | #2 Syracuse |
| October 17 | @ Clemson | 2–1 | #10 Virginia |
| October 18 | @ Seton Hall | 1–0 | #3 Georgetown |
| October 18 | @ Old Dominion | 2–1 | #4 Charlotte |
| October 18 | @ Kentucky | 1–0 | #9 New Mexico |
| October 19 | Maryland | 2–1 | @ #5 Indiana |
| October 22 | @ UC Riverside | 2–1 | #3 UC Irvine |
| October 22 | @ Oakland | 2–0 | #10 Michigan State |
| October 22 | West Virginia | 2–1 | #12 Penn State |
| October 25 | #17 Georgetown | 1–0 | @ #2 Creighton |
| October 25 | Cal State Northridge | 3–0 | @ #3 UC Irvine |
| October 29 | @ UAB | 3–2 | #15 New Mexico |
| November 1 | Marshall | 2–1 | @ #15 New Mexico |
| November 1 | @ Cal State Northridge | 2–0 | #14 UC Irvine |
| November 2 | #17 California | 1–0 | @ #1 UCLA |
| November 2 | @ Butler | 2–0 | #11 Providence |
| November 2 | Michigan | 3–2 | @ #12 Michigan State |
| November 5 | # 21 Michigan State | 3–2 | @ #2 Indiana |
| November 7 | Oregon State | 4–3 | #7 California |
| November 9 | Louisville | 1–0 | @ #9 North Carolina |
| November 14 | #19 Louisville | 2–1 @ Cary, NC | #1 Syracuse |
| November 14 | #14 Clemson | 1–1 (5–4 PK) @ Cary, NC | # 2 Notre Dame |
| November 14 | @ Old Dominion | 2–1 | #4 Charlotte |
| November 14 | #23 Providence | 1–0 @ Chester, PA | #5 Creighton |
| November 14 | Fordham | 2–1 @ Richmond, VA | #10 Saint Louis |
| November 16 | Oregon State | 2–0 | @ #9 Washington |
| November 16 | #23 Providence | 2–1 @ Chester, PA | #11 Xavier |

== Statistics ==
=== Individuals ===
GOALS
| Rank | Scorer | School | Games | Goals |
|---|---|---|---|---|
| 1 | Neco Brett | Robert Morris | 18 | 15 |
| | Andy Craven | North Carolina | 22 | 15 |
| | Cameron Porter | Princeton | 17 | 15 |
| 3 | Pat Flynn | Bowling Green | 21 | 14 |
| | Robert Kristo | Saint Louis | 20 | 14 |
| | Adam Najem | Akron | 21 | 14 |
| 7 | Andy Bevin | West Virginia | 19 | 13 |
| | Timi Mulgrew | George Mason | 20 | 13 |
| 9 | 8 tied | | | 11 |

Last update on December 14, 2014. Source: NCAA.com - Total Goals

GOALS AGAINST AVERAGE
| Rank | Keeper | School | Games | Minutes | GA | GAA |
|---|---|---|---|---|---|---|
| 1 | Eric Klenofsky | Monmouth | 21 | 2050 | 11 | .483 |
| 2 | Connor Sparrow | Creighton | 22 | 2039 | 11 | .485 |
| 3 | Matt Turner | Fairfield | 19 | 1807 | 10 | .452 |
| 4 | Scott Levene | UConn | 11 | 1043 | 6 | .518 |
| 5 | Addison Watson | Missouri State | 16 | 1514 | 9 | .535 |
| 6 | Billy Heavner | UMBC | 17 | 1513 | 9 | .535 |
| 7 | Alex Bono | Syracuse | 21 | 1949 | 12 | .554 |
| 8 | Tyler Miller | Northwestern | 19 | 1857 | 12 | .581 |
| 9 | Jackson Morgan | Navy | 18 | 1696 | 11 | .584 |
| 10 | Sven Lissek | Furman | 21 | 1998 | 13 | .585 |

Last update on December 14, 2014. Source: NCAA.com - Goals Against Average

ASSISTS
| Rank | Player | School | Games | Assists |
|---|---|---|---|---|
| 1 | Eric Lynch | Wright State | 21 | 13 |
| 2 | Connor Hallisey | California | 19 | 12 |
| | Khiry Shelton | Oregon State | 21 | 12 |
| 4 | Pablo Medina | Saint Francis (PA) | 20 | 11 |
| 5 | Sean Conerty | Western Michigan | 15 | 10 |
| | Sean Davis | Duke | 16 | 10 |
| | Michael Gamble | Wake Forest | 15 | 10 |
| 8 | Lucas Baldin | South Florida | 20 | 9 |
| | Lucas Diniz | Stetson | 16 | 9 |
| | Joseph Holland | Hofstra | 19 | 9 |
| | Edwin Moalosi | South Florida | 20 | 9 |
| | Timo Pitter | Creighton | 22 | 9 |
| | Will Walker | Xavier | 23 | 9 |

Last update on December 14, 2014. Source: NCAA.com - Total Assists

SAVE PERCENTAGE
| Rank | Keeper | School | Games | Saves | GA | Save % |
|---|---|---|---|---|---|---|
| 1 | Matt Turner | Fairfield | 19 | 78 | 10 | .886 |
| 2 | Eric Klenofsky | Monmouth | 21 | 81 | 11 | .880 |
| 3 | Tyler Miller | Northwestern | 19 | 70 | 12 | .854 |
| 4 | Zach Zagorski | Cornell | 17 | 64 | 11 | .853 |
| 5 | Borja Angoitia | Quinnipiac | 18 | 75 | 13 | .852 |
| 6 | Alex Bono | Syracuse | 21 | 67 | 12 | .848 |
| 7 | Yves Dietrich | Western Illinois | 19 | 97 | 18 | .843 |
| 8 | Billy Heavner | UMBC | 17 | 48 | 9 | .842 |
| 9 | Greg Ranjitsingh | Mercer | 21 | 106 | 20 | .841 |
| 10 | Connor Sparrow | Creighton | 22 | 58 | 11 | .841 |

Last update on December 14, 2014. Source: NCAA.com - Save pct

TOTAL POINTS
| Rank | Player | School | Games | Goals | Assists | Points |
|---|---|---|---|---|---|---|
| 1 | Andy Craven | North Carolina | 22 | 15 | 5 | 35 |
| 2 | Andy Bevin | West Virginia | 19 | 13 | 8 | 34 |
| | Cameron Porter | Princeton | 17 | 15 | 4 | 34 |
| 4 | Neco Brett | Robert Morris | 18 | 15 | 3 | 33 |
| 5 | Pat Flynn | Bowling Green | 21 | 14 | 4 | 32 |
| | Adam Najem | Akron | 21 | 14 | 4 | 32 |
| | Khiry Shelton | Oregon State | 21 | 10 | 12 | 32 |
| 8 | Ethan Kutler | Colgate | 18 | 12 | 7 | 31 |
| 9 | Robert Kristo | Saint Louis | 20 | 14 | 2 | 30 |
| | Connor Hallisey | California | 19 | 9 | 12 | 30 |

Last update on December 14, 2014. Source: NCAA.com - Total Points

TOTAL SAVES
| Rank | Keeper | School | Games | Saves |
|---|---|---|---|---|
| 1 | Dan Jackson | UNC Asheville | 17 | 118 |
| 2 | Eric Hamilton | Howard | 18 | 111 |
| 3 | Greg Ranjitsingh | Mercer | 21 | 106 |
| 4 | Matthew Mozynski | Campbell | 18 | 101 |
| 5 | Shane Haworth | Seattle | 19 | 99 |
| 6 | Andre Rawls | St. Mary's | 19 | 98 |
| 7 | Brenden Alfery | Robert Morris | 18 | 97 |
| | Yves Dietrich | Western Illinois | 19 | 97 |
| | Jack Falle | Georgia Southern | 17 | 97 |
| 10 | Alex Guerra | VMI | 14 | 96 |
| | Wade Hamilton | Cal Poly | 19 | 96 |

Last update on December 14, 2014. Source: NCAA.com - Total Saves

=== Teams ===
SCORING OFFENSE
| Rank | School | Games | Goals | Goals/Game |
|---|---|---|---|---|
| 1 | California | 19 | 47 | 2.474 |
| 2 | North Carolina | 22 | 52 | 2.364 |
| 3 | Winthrop | 19 | 44 | 2.316 |
| 4 | Wofford | 18 | 40 | 2.222 |
| | Rider | 18 | 40 | 2.222 |
| 6 | Charlotte | 19 | 41 | 2.158 |
| 7 | Coastal Carolina | 23 | 48 | 2.087 |
| 8 | Delaware | 20 | 41 | 2.050 |
| 9 | Stetson | 17 | 34 | 2.000 |
| | Princeton | 17 | 34 | 2.000 |
| | UNLV | 22 | 44 | 2.000 |

Last update on December 14, 2014. Source: NCAA.com - Goals/Game

SCORING DEFENSE (Team Goals Against Average)
| Rank | School | Games | Minutes | GA | Team GAA |
|---|---|---|---|---|---|
| 1 | Monmouth | 21 | 2050 | 11 | .483 |
| 2 | Creighton | 22 | 2044 | 11 | .484 |
| 3 | Syracuse | 21 | 1949 | 12 | .554 |
| 4 | Missouri State | 18 | 1733 | 11 | .571 |
| 5 | Northwestern | 19 | 1857 | 12 | .582 |
| 6 | Fairfield | 20 | 1958 | 13 | .598 |
| 7 | Furman | 22 | 2088 | 14 | .603 |
| 8 | Georgetown | 23 | 2208 | 15 | .611 |
| 9 | Cornell | 17 | 1585 | 11 | .625 |
| 10 | Navy | 20 | 1939 | 14 | .6498 |

Last update on December 14, 2014. Source: NCAA.com - Team GAA

SHUTOUT PERCENTAGE
| Rank | School | Games | Shutouts | Shutout % |
|---|---|---|---|---|
| 1 | Fairfield | 20 | 13 | .650 |
| 2 | Cornell | 17 | 11 | .647 |
| 3 | Missouri State | 18 | 11 | .611 |
| 4 | Monmouth | 21 | 12 | .571 |
| | Syracuse | 21 | 12 | .571 |
| | St. Louis | 21 | 12 | .571 |
| 7 | Michigan State | 23 | 13 | .565 |
| 8 | Creighton | 22 | 12 | .545 |
| | Furman | 22 | 12 | .545 |
| 10 | George Mason | 20 | 10 | .500 |
| | Kentucky | 20 | 10 | .500 |
| | Saint Francis (PA) | 20 | 10 | .500 |
| | Penn State | 20 | 10 | .500 |
| | Marquette | 18 | 9 | .500 |

Last update on December 14, 2014. Source: NCAA.com - SO Pct

- All statistics are through the games of December 14, 2014. (Final)

WON-LOST-TIED PERCENTAGE
| Rank | School | Wins | Loses | Ties | W-L-T % |
|---|---|---|---|---|---|
| 1 | Creighton | 16 | 3 | 3 | .795 |
| 2 | Syracuse | 15 | 2 | 1 | .786 |
| 3 | Charlotte | 14 | 4 | 1 | .763 |
| | Stanford | 13 | 3 | 3 | .763 |
| 5 | Providence | 16 | 5 | 2 | .739 |
| 6 | Winthrop | 13 | 4 | 2 | .737 |
| 7 | Lipscomb | 12 | 4 | 1 | .735 |
| | Princeton | 11 | 3 | 3 | .735 |
| 9 | North Carolina | 15 | 5 | 2 | .727 |
| 10 | Davidson | 10 | 2 | 6 | .722 |

Last update on December 14, 2014. Source: NCAA.com - Team W-L-T pct

== NCAA tournament ==
The College Cup was played at WakeMed Soccer Park in Cary, North Carolina on December 12 & 14, 2014. In the semifinals, Virginia defeated UMBC 1–0 and UCLA beat Providence 3–2 in double overtime. In the finals, Virginia and UCLA played to a scoreless draw through two extra periods, and Virginia won its seventh national crown on penalty kicks, 4–2.

== Postseason polls ==
Post season polls with (pre-season rankings).

NSCAA
| Rank | Team |
|---|---|
| 1 | Virginia (3) |
| 2 | UCLA (4) |
| 3 | Providence (—) |
| 4 | UMBC (19) |
| 5 | Georgetown (9) |
| 6 | North Carolina (22) |
| 7 | Creighton (—) |
| 8 | Michigan State (10) |
| 9 | Notre Dame (1) |
| 10 | Syracuse (—) |
| 11 | Clemson (—) |
| 12 | Washington (6) |
| 13 | Xavier (—) |
| 14 | UC Irvine (16) |
| 15 | California (7) |
| 16 | Stanford (20) |
| 17 | Indiana (—) |
| 18 | Louisville (14) |
| 19 | Maryland (2) |
| 20 | Charlotte (23) |
| 21 | Saint Louis (—) |
| 22 | Coastal Carolina (17) |
| 23 | Penn State (15) |
| 24 | Old Dominion (t25) |
| 25 | Dartmouth (—) |

College Soccer News
| Rank | Team |
|---|---|
No Poll

Soccer America
| Rank | Team |
|---|---|
No Poll

Top Drawer Soccer
| Rank | Team |
|---|---|
| 1 | Virginia (4) |
| 2 | UCLA (2) |
| 3 | Providence (—) |
| 4 | UMBC (15) |
| 5 | North Carolina (6) |
| 6 | Georgetown (11) |
| 7 | Creighton (—) |
| 8 | Michigan State (8) |
| 9 | Notre Dame (1) |
| 10 | Syracuse (—) |
| 11 | Xavier (—) |
| 12 | UC Irvine (18) |
| 13 | Clemson (—) |
| 14 | Louisville (10) |
| 15 | California (25) |
| 16 | Washington (5) |
| 17 | Stanford (12) |
| 18 | Maryland (3) |
| 19 | Indiana (—) |
| 20 | Charlotte (—) |
| 21 | Ohio State (—) |
| 22 | Furman (—) |
| 23 | Coastal Carolina (—) |
| 24 | Old Dominion (—) |
| 25 | Akron (14) |

College Sports Madness
| Rank | Team |
|---|---|
No Poll

== See also ==
- College soccer
- List of NCAA Division I men's soccer programs
- 2014 in American soccer
- 2014 NCAA Division I Men's Soccer Championship
