= Diego Campos (Costa Rican footballer) =

Costa Rican footballer (born 1995)

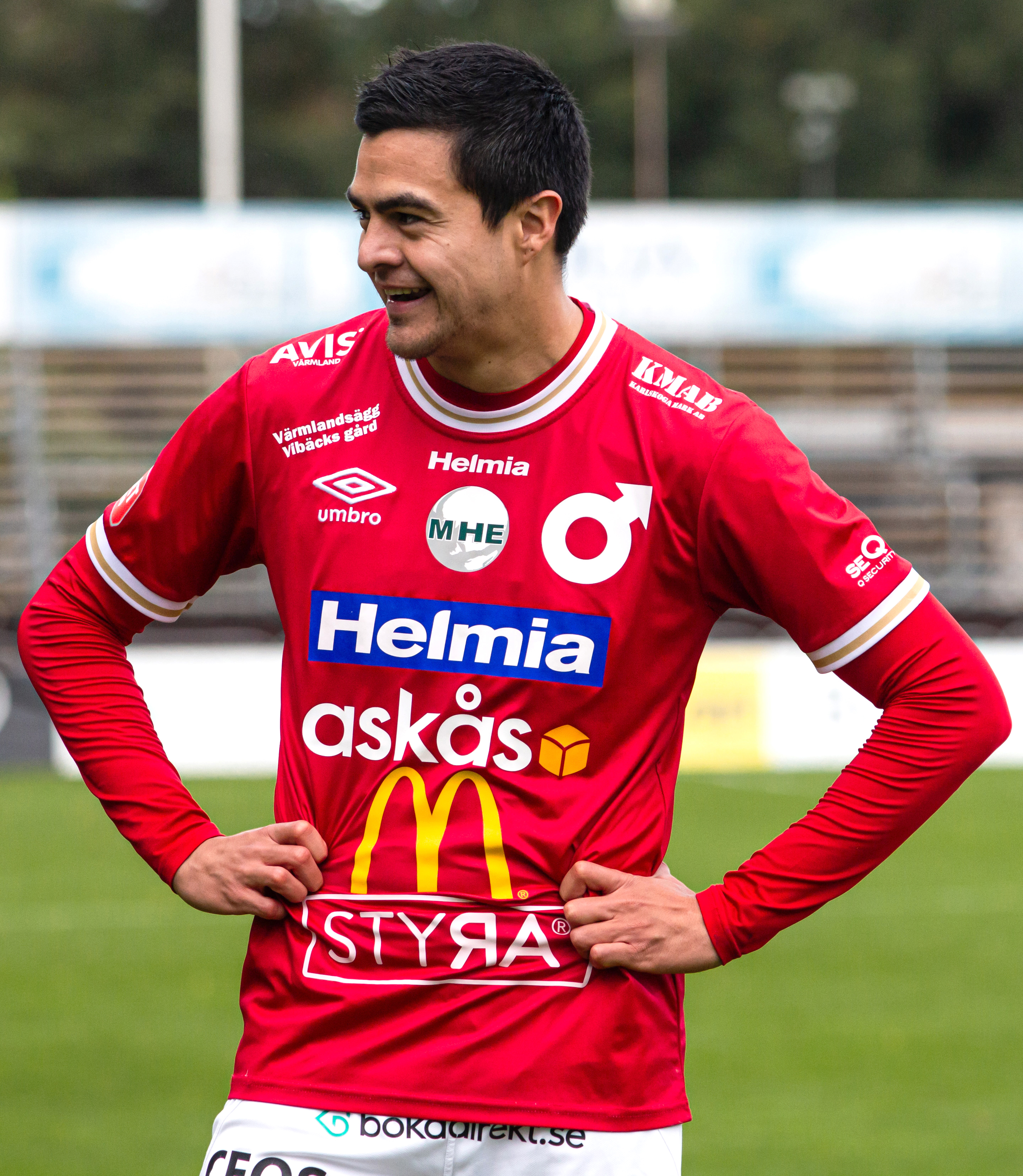
- Campos with Degerfors in 2023

Personal information
- Full name: Diego de Jesús Campos Ballestero
- Date of birth: 1 October 1995 (age 31)
- Place of birth: San José, Costa Rica
- Height: 1.78 m (5 ft 10 in)
- Position: Winger

Youth career
- 2013–2014: Montverde Academy

College career
Years	Team	Apps	(Gls)
2014–2017	Clemson Tigers	81	(23)

Senior career*
Years	Team	Apps	(Gls)
2017	SIMA Águilas	8	(6)
2018–2020	Chicago Fire	33	(1)
2018	→ Indy Eleven (loan)	0	(0)
2020–2021	Jerv	48	(15)
2022–2023	Degerfors IF	56	(11)
2024–2025	Alajuelense	78	(17)
2026	Bali United	12	(4)

International career
2015	Costa Rica U23	1	(0)
2023–	Costa Rica	3	(1)
- * Club domestic league appearances and goals as of 27 April 2026

Diego de Jesús Campos Ballestero (born 1 October 1995) is a Costa Rican professional footballer who plays as a winger.

== Club career ==
=== Clemson University and SIMA Águilas ===
Campos played four years of college soccer at Clemson University. During his time with the Tigers, Campos scored 23 goals and tallied 22 assists in 81 appearances.

Campos also appeared for USL PDL side SIMA Águilas in 2017.

=== Chicago Fire ===
On 19 January 2018, Campos was selected with the 38th overall pick of the 2018 MLS SuperDraft by the Chicago Fire. Campos signed with the club the next month on February 28. Campos made his professional debut on March 31, as a half-time substitute during a 2–2 draw with Portland Timbers.

=== FK Jerv ===
He signed for FK Jerv for the 2020 season on a free transfer from the Chicago Fire.

=== Degerfors IF ===
Ahead of the 2022 season, Diego Campos joined for Degerfors IF in Allsvenskan. He signed on a three-year deal becoming the first player from Costa Rica to play for the club.

=== Alajuelense ===
In January 2024, Campos returned to his home country by signing a two-year deal with Alajuelense. His wife, Kari, joined the club's women's team at the same time, making them the first married couple to play together for Alajuelense.

== International career ==
In June 2023 Campos was named to the Costa Rica squad for the 2023 CONCACAF Gold Cup. He scored his first international goal against Martinique in the third and final game of the group stage.

== Personal life ==
Campos met fellow soccer player Kari Johnston when they were in college. The couple married in December 2023. They welcomed a son in April 2025.

== Honours ==
Individual

- Norwegian First Division Player of the Month: July 2020
