= 2014 Wake Forest Demon Deacons men's soccer team =

Wake Forest Demon Deacons
2014 season
- Head Coach: Jay Vidovich
- Stadium: Spry Stadium
- ACC: TBD
Home colors	Away colors	Third colors

The 2014 Wake Forest Demon Deacons men's soccer team will be the college's 35th season of playing organized men's college soccer, and their 35th season playing in the Atlantic Coast Conference.

== Roster ==
As of 2014: Note: Flags indicate national team as defined under FIFA eligibility rules; some limited exceptions apply. Players may hold more than one non-FIFA nationality.

No.	Pos.	Nation	Player
0	GK	USA	Alec Ferrell
1	GK	USA	Andrew Harris
2	DF	USA	Kris Reaves
3	DF	USA	Rafael Fagundo
4	DF	USA	Kevin Politz
5	DF	USA	Sam Fink
6	DF	USA	Jared Odenbeck
7	MF	ESP	Jon Bakero
8	MF	USA	Jacori Hayes
10	FW	USA	Michael Gamble
11	DF	USA	Philip Parker
14	MF	USA	Thomas Haws
15	MF	USA	Steven Echvarria
16	MF	USA	Ian Harkes

No.	Pos.	Nation	Player
17	MF	USA	John Schuman
18	FW	USA	Heath Honold
19	MF	USA	Dominic Scotti
20	MF	USA	Hunter Bandy
21	MF	USA	Hayden Partain
23	FW	USA	Hank Gauger
24	DF	USA	Chase Rhode
25	MF	USA	Ricky Greensfelder
26	DF	USA	Zach Fingerhut
27	FW	USA	Ian Story
28	FW	NZL	Tane Gent
29	DF	USA	Shane Powell
30	GK	USA	Grant Bishop
32	FW	USA	Matt Szucs

== Competitions ==
=== Spring exhibitions ===
Date	Time	Opponent	Rank	Location	Result	Scorers	Attendance	Record	Ref.
02/28/14	7:00 pm	Duke	—	Spry Stadium • Winston-Salem, NC	D 0–0		351	0–0–1	
03/29/14	12:00 pm	Mars Hill	—	Spry Stadium • Winston-Salem, NC					
03/29/14	7:00 pm	vs. Charlotte	—	Bryan Park • Greensboro, NC (Greensboro Invitational)					
04/05/14	1:00 pm	at Georgetown	—	North Kehoe Field • Washington, DC					
04/12/14	7:00 pm	North Carolina	—	Spry Stadium • Winston-Salem, NC					
04/17/14	7:00 pm	Campbell	—	Spry Stadium • Winston-Salem, NC					

== Regular season ==
Win Tie Loss

- Ranking indicates that week's NSCAA National Rankings

=== Preseason ===
2014-08-18	Wake Forest Demon Deacons	1 – 2	Gardner–Webb Runnin' Bulldogs	Winston-Salem, North Carolina
19:30 UTC−05	Scotti 52' (pen.)	Report	Gurser 31' (pen.); Clarke 36'	Stadium: Spry Stadium; Attendance: 327; Referee: David Erbacher

2014-08-23	Wake Forest Demon Deacons	2 – 1	North Carolina Tar Heels	Winston-Salem, North Carolina
19:00 UTC−05				Stadium: Spry Stadium; Attendance: 3,186

=== 2014 Regular season ===
2014-08-29	#11 Wake Forest Demon Deacons	1 – 3	#4 UCLA Bruins	Winston-Salem, North Carolina
19:30 UTC−05	Harkes 13'	Report	Tusaazemajja 16'; Ndjock 22'; Adekoya 88'	Stadium: Spry Stadium; Attendance: 3,738; Referee: Ignacio James

2014-08-31	#11 Wake Forest Demon Deacons	1 – 4	#7 California Golden Bears	Winston-Salem, North Carolina
19:00 UTC−05	Gauger 64'	Report	Hallisey 15'; Thierjung 27'; Bonomo 48'; Oldham 69'	Stadium: Spry Stadium; Attendance: 1,416; Referee: Mathew Richardson

2014-09-05	Wake Forest Demon Deacons	2 – 1 (a.e.t.)	#21 Connecticut Huskies	Winston-Salem, North Carolina
19:00 UTC−05	Odenbeck 36'; Greensfelder 93'	Report	Larin 4'	Stadium: Spry Stadium; Attendance: 682; Referee: Mohammad Samandpour

2014-09-07	Wake Forest Demon Deacons	4 – 1	Cleveland State Vikings	Winston-Salem, North Carolina
19:00 UTC−05	Gamble 33' (pen.); Gauger 54'; Greensfelder 82'; Hayes 86'	Report	Manesio 66'	Stadium: Spry Stadium; Attendance: 513; Referee: Mark Kadlecik

2014-09-12	Wake Forest Demon Deacons	2 – 1	NC State Wolfpack	Winston-Salem, North Carolina
19:00 UTC−05	Partain 17'; Gamble 46'	Report	Bajza 55'	Stadium: Spry Stadium; Attendance: 2,438; Referee: Fotis Bazakos

2014-09-16	Davidson Wildcats	Postponed	Wake Forest Demon Deacons	Davidson, North Carolina
19:00 UTC−05				Stadium: Alumni Soccer Stadium

2014-09-19	Virginia Tech Hokies	2 – 0	Wake Forest Demon Deacons	Blacksburg, Virginia
20:30 UTC−05	John 53'; Kirch 89'	Report		Stadium: Thompson Field; Attendance: 2,023; Referee: Ted Levac

2014-09-23	Wake Forest Demon Deacons	7 – 0	VMI Keydets	Winston-Salem, North Carolina
19:00 UTC−05	Gamble 17', 35', 43', 58'; Partain 58'; Fink 69'; Gent 84'	Report		Stadium: Spry Stadium; Attendance: 331; Referee: Mike Stutt

2014-09-26	Clemson Tigers	3 – 1	Wake Forest Demon Deacons	Clemson, South Carolina
19:00 UTC−05	Moreno 27'; Fisher 55'; Casner 89'	Report	Gent 8'	Stadium: Riggs Field; Attendance: 3,084; Referee: Guido Gonzalez

2014-09-30	Wake Forest Demon Deacons	2 – 1	Akron Zips	Winston-Salem, North Carolina
19:00 UTC−05	Harkes 33'; Greensfelder 38'	Report	Laryea 50'	Stadium: Spry Stadium; Attendance: 1,107; Referee: Peter Dhima

2014-10-03	Wake Forest Demon Deacons	4 – 1	Duke Blue Devils	Winston-Salem, North Carolina
19:00 UTC−05	Fink 44'; Bakero 59'; Odenbeck 74'; Gent 85'	Report	Palodichuk 56'	Stadium: Spry Stadium; Attendance: 2,731; Referee: John Douglas

2014-10-06	Wake Forest Demon Deacons	0 – 1	Hofstra Pride	Winston-Salem, North Carolina
19:00 UTC−05		Report	Memic 49' (pen.)	Stadium: Spry Stadium; Attendance: 322; Referee: Peter Dhima

2014-10-10	#4 Syracuse Orange	3 – 1	Wake Forest Demon Deacons	Syracuse, New York
19:00 UTC−05	Hilliard 9', 48'; Nanco 70'	Report	Gauger 87'	Stadium: SU Soccer Stadium; Attendance: 1,611; Referee: Keith Angel

2014-10-17	Wake Forest Demon Deacons	4 – 1	Boston College Eagles	Winston-Salem, North Carolina
19:00 UTC−05	6' (o.g.); Bakero 34', 42'; Greensfelder 59'	Report	DeNormandie 32'	Stadium: Spry Stadium; Attendance: 1,662; Referee: Nikola Aleksic

2014-10-21	Wake Forest Demon Deacons	4 – 0	Howard Bison	Winston-Salem, North Carolina
19:00 UTC−05	Bakero 16', 48'; Bandy 49'; Greensfelder 90'	Report		Stadium: Spry Stadium; Attendance: 417; Referee: David Erbacher

2014-10-24	#22 Virginia Cavaliers	1 – 2	Wake Forest Demon Deacons	Charlottesville, Virginia
18:30 UTC−05	Foss 81'	Report	Parker 8'; Bakero 83'	Stadium: Klöckner Stadium; Attendance: 3,146; Referee: John Brady

2014-10-28	#22 Wake Forest Demon Deacons	0 – 1	#7 Charlotte 49ers	Winston-Salem, North Carolina
19:00 UTC−05		Report	Bronico 27'	Stadium: Spry Stadium; Attendance: 1,732; Referee: Carmen Serbio

2014-11-01	#22 Wake Forest Demon Deacons	1 – 0 (a.e.t.)	#9 Louisville Cardinals	Winston-Salem, North Carolina
19:00 UTC−05	Greensfelder 94'	Report		Stadium: Spry Stadium; Attendance: 1,631; Referee: Cory Richardson

=== 2014 ACC Tournament ===
2014-11-09 Quarterfinal	#17 Clemson Tigers	1 – 1 (a.e.t.) (3–2 p)	#18 Wake Forest Demon Deacons	Clemson, South Carolina
13:00 UTC−05	Campos 61'	Report	54' (o.g.)	Stadium: Riggs Field; Attendance: 2,096; Referee: John McCloskey
	Penalties
	Amirkhanian (penalty scored); Campos (penalty missed); Moreno (penalty scored); Clowes (penalty missed); Kavita (penalty scored)		(penalty missed) Fink; (penalty missed) Bakero; (penalty scored) Partain; (penalty scored) Harkes; (penalty missed) Echevarria

=== 2014 NCAA Tournament ===
- Ranking indicates NCAA Tournament seeding.

2014-11-20 First Round	Wake Forest Demon Deacons	0 – 0 (a.e.t.) (2–3 p)	UMBC Retrievers	Winston-Salem, North Carolina
19:00 UTC−05		Report		Stadium: Spry Stadium; Attendance: 909; Referee: Carmen Serbio
	Penalties
	Harkes (penalty missed); Rhode (penalty scored); Bakero (penalty missed); Hayes (penalty scored); Odenbeck (penalty missed)		(penalty missed) Kansaye; (penalty scored) Caltabiano; (penalty scored) Becker; (penalty scored) Scott; (penalty missed) Banjo

== Transfers ==
=== Out ===
No.	Pos.	Player	Transferred to	Fee/notes	Date	Source
15	MF	(United States) Jalen Robinson	(United States) D.C. United	Signed a HGP contract	January 6, 2014	
9	FW	(United States) Sean Okoli	(United States) Seattle Sounders FC	Signed a HGP contract	January 9, 2014	
18	DF	(United States) Chris Duvall	(United States) New York Red Bulls	Selected in the 2014 MLS SuperDraft	January 16, 2014	
2	MF	(United States) Jared Watts	(United States) Colorado Rapids	Selected in the 2014 MLS SuperDraft	January 16, 2014	
4	DF	(United States) Tolani Ibikunle	(United States) Colorado Rapids	Selected in the 2014 MLS SuperDraft	January 23, 2014	
11	MF	(Brazil) Luca Gimenez	(United States) Philadelphia Union	Selected in the 2014 MLS SuperDraft	January 23, 2014	

== See also ==
- Wake Forest Demon Deacons men's soccer
- 2014 Atlantic Coast Conference men's soccer season
- 2014 NCAA Division I men's soccer season
- 2014 ACC Men's Soccer Tournament
- 2014 NCAA Division I Men's Soccer Championship
