= 2014 Louisville Cardinals men's soccer team =

American college soccer season

The 2014 Louisville Cardinals men's soccer team represented the University of Louisville during the 2014 NCAA Division I men's soccer season.

== See also ==
- Louisville Cardinals men's soccer
- 2014 Atlantic Coast Conference men's soccer season
- 2014 NCAA Division I men's soccer season
- 2014 ACC Men's Soccer Tournament
- 2014 NCAA Division I Men's Soccer Championship
