= TopDrawerSoccer =

American soccer website

TopDrawerSoccer.com
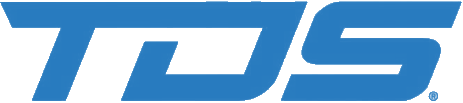
- Available in: English
- Owner: Robert Ziegler
- Editors: J.R. Eskilson, Travis Clark
- Website: topdrawersoccer.com
- Commercial: No
- Registration: Yes
- Launched: August 15, 2003; 23 years ago

TopDrawerSoccer.com (TDS) is an American soccer website that is dedicated to youth soccer in the United States. Specifically, the website focuses on Academy soccer, high school soccer, and college soccer in the United States. The website was launched by Robert Ziegler in 2003.

== Profile and history ==
The website was founded ahead of the 2003 college soccer season by Robert Ziegler who was looking to create a website dedicated to the collegiate game and youth soccer in the United States. It runs its own Top 100 youth soccer players nationally and regionally for both boys and girls soccer for all levels of the game.

Since 2011, the website has awarded the TopDrawerSoccer.com National Player of the Year Award which is awarded to the best men's and women's college soccer players for the season. It was first awarded following the 2011 NCAA Division I men's and women's seasons.

== Awards ==
=== National Player of the Year ===
The TopDrawerSoccer.com National Player of the Year Award is an annual award given by TopDrawerSoccer.com to the best men's and women's players in American college soccer. The award has been given annually since 2011.

==== Men's Award ====
Men's TDS National Player of the Year
Year	Nat.	Name	School	Position	Class	Ref.
2011	JAM	Darren Mattocks	Akron	FW	Sophomore	
2012	USA	Eriq Zavaleta	Indiana	DF	Sophomore	
2013	USA	Harry Shipp	Notre Dame	MF	Senior	
2014	GHA	Joshua Yaro	Georgetown	DF	Junior	
2015	USA	Jordan Morris	Stanford	FW	Junior	
2016	USA	Ian Harkes	Wake Forest	MF	Senior	
2017	USA	Tomas Hilliard-Arce	Stanford	DF	Senior	
2018	USA	Andrew Gutman	Indiana	DF	Senior	
2019	NZL	Joe Bell	Virginia	MF	Junior	
2020	SRB	Veljko Petković	Pittsburgh	MF	Sophomore	
2021	USA	Dante Polvara	Georgetown	DF	Junior	
2022	USA	Duncan McGuire	Creighton	FW	Sophomore	
2023	USA	Bryan Dowd	Notre Dame	GK	Senior	
2024	USA	Sam Bassett	Denver	MF	Senior	
2025	SEN	Junior Diouf	Grand Canyon	FW	Freshman	

==== Women's Award ====
Women's TDS National Player of the Year
Year	Nat.	Name	School	Position	Class	Ref.
2011	MEX	Teresa Noyola	Stanford	MF	Senior	
2012	USA	Christine Nairn	Penn State	MF	Senior	
2013	USA	Morgan Brian	Virginia	MF	Junior	
2014	USA	Morgan Brian	Virginia	MF	Senior	
2015	CRC	Raquel Rodríguez	Penn State	FW	Senior	
2016	CAN	Kadeisha Buchanan	West Virginia	DF	Senior	
2017	USA	Andi Sullivan	Stanford	MF	Senior	
2018	USA	Catarina Macario	Stanford	DF	Sophomore	
2019	USA	Catarina Macario (2)	Stanford	DF	Junior	
2020	USA	Kelsey Turnbow	Santa Clara	FW	Senior	
2021	USA	Mikayla Colohan	BYU	MF	Senior	
2022	USA	Korbin Albert	Notre Dame	MF	Sophomore	
2023	USA	Lexi Missimo	Texas	MF	Junior	
2024	USA	Kate Faasse	North Carolina	FW	Junior	
2025	USA	Jasmine Aikey	Stanford	FW	Senior	

==== Winners by school ====
School	Men	Women	Total
Stanford	2	4	6
Virginia	1	2	3
Georgetown	2	0	2
Indiana	2	0	2
Notre Dame	1	1	2
Penn State	0	2	2
Akron	1	0	1
BYU	0	1	1
Denver	1	0	1
Grand Canyon	1	0	1
Pittsburgh	1	0	1
Santa Clara	0	1	1
Texas	0	1	1
Wake Forest	1	0	1
West Virginia	0	1	1

=== National Freshman of the Year ===
Since 2011, TopDrawerSoccer.com has named the national freshman of the year for both men's and women's soccer.

==== Men's and Women's Awards ====
Men's TDS National Freshman of the Year
Year	Nat.	Name	School	Position	Ref.
2011	USA	Wil Trapp	Akron	MF	
2012	USA	Brandon Allen	Georgetown	FW	
2013	CAN	Cyle Larin	UConn	FW	
2014	GHA	Abu Danladi	UCLA	FW	
2015	ENG	Jack Harrison	Wake Forest	MF	
2016	USA	Cameron Lindley	North Carolina	MF	
2017	POR	João Moutinho	Akron	MF	
2018	USA	Carlo Ritaccio	Akron	DF	
2019	USA	Aidan Morris	Indiana	MF	
2020	FRA	Bertin Jacquesson	Pitt	FW	
2021	ESP	Álex López	Tulsa	GK	
2022	USA	CJ Fodrey	San Diego State	MF	
2023	USA	Alex Harris	Cornell	FW	
2024	GHA	Ransford Gyan	Clemson	FW	
2025	SEN	Junior Diouf	Grand Canyon	FW	

Women's TDS National Freshman of the Year
Year	Nat.	Name	School	Position	Ref.
2011	USA	Morgan Brian	Virginia	MF	
2012	USA	Cari Roccaro	Notre Dame	DF	
2013	USA	Savannah Jordan	Florida	FW	
2014	USA	Andi Sullivan	Stanford	FW	
2015	IRE	Megan Connolly	Florida State	MF	
2016	CAN	Jessie Fleming	UCLA	MF	
2017	USA	Catarina Macario	Stanford	FW	
2018	CHN	Yujie Zhao	Florida State	MF	
2019	USA	Angelina Anderson	California	GK	
2020	USA	Lia Godfrey	Virginia	MF	
2021	USA	Michelle Cooper	Duke	FW	
2022	USA	Elise Evans	Stanford	DF	
2023	USA	Jordynn Dudley	Florida State	FW	
2024	USA	Izzy Engle	Notre Dame	FW	
2025	USA	Y-Lan Nguyen	Stanford	MF	
