= 2015 NCAA Division I men's soccer championship game =

NCAA Division I men's soccer championship game
- Event: 2015 NCAA Division I Men's Soccer Championship
Clemson Tigers	Stanford Cardinal
ACC	Pac-12
0	4
- Date: December 13, 2015
- Venue: Children's Mercy Park, Kansas City, Kansas
- Most Valuable Player: Jordan Morris
- Weather: Rain and 58 °F (14 °C)

The 2015 NCAA Division I men's soccer championship game was the final game of the 2015 NCAA Division I Men's Soccer Championship, determining the national champion for the 2015 NCAA Division I men's soccer season. The match was played at Children's Mercy Park in Kansas City, Kansas, a soccer-specific stadium that is home to Major League Soccer club, Sporting Kansas City. The match was between two-seeded Clemson, and eighth-seeded Stanford. Stanford won the match 4–0.

== Venue ==
Children's Mercy Park
Kansas City
Capacity: 18,467
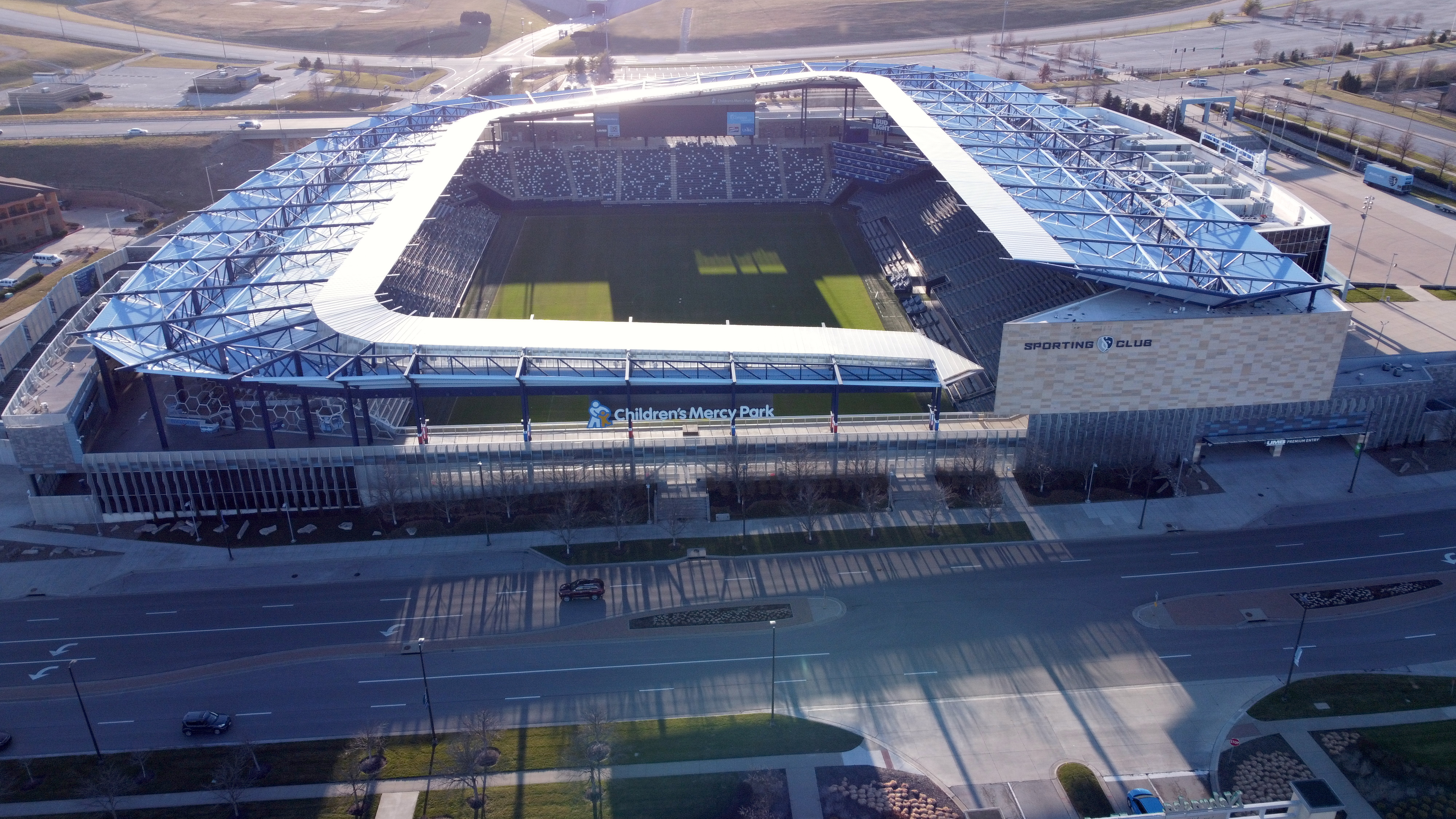

== Match details ==
December 13, 2015
2:00 p.m. EST

Clemson	0–4	Stanford
	Report	Morris 2', 50'; Vincent 70' (pen.); Verso 73'

Children's Mercy Park, Kansas City, Kansas
Attendance: 4,081
Referee: Chris Penso

Clemson	Stanford

GK	22	(United States) Andrew Tarbell
RB	11	(England) Aaron Jones		(yellow card) 28'
CB	2	(United States) Kyle Fisher (c)
CB	3	(Denmark) Patrick Bunk-Andersen
LB	13	(United States) Michael Melvin
RM	7	(Norway) Iman Mafi	(substituted off) 72'
CM	6	(Isle of Man) Paul Clowes
CM	4	(England) Oliver Shannon	(substituted off) 63'
LM	17	(Brazil) Thales Moreno
ST	9	(Costa Rica) Diego Campos	(substituted off) 78'	(yellow card) 71'
ST	10	(United States) T. J. Casner
Manager:
(United States) Mike Noonan

GK	1	(United States) Andrew Epstein
RB	12	(United States) Drew Skundrich
CB	4	(United States) Tomas Hilliard-Arce
CB	8	(United States) Brian Nana-Sinkham
LB	3	(United States) Brandon Vincent
RM	10	(United States) Corey Baird
CM	7	(United States) Ty Thompson
CM	5	(United States) Slater Meehan		(yellow card) 18'
LM	15	(United States) Eric Verso (c)	(substituted off) 59'	(yellow card) 74'
CF	2	(United States) Foster Langsdorf	(substituted off) 90+1'
ST	13	(United States) Jordan Morris	(substituted off) 90+1'
Manager:
(England) Jeremy Gunn

College Cup MVP: Jordan Morris

Assistant referees:
Ian Anderson (United States)
Cory Richardson (United States)
Fourth official:
Mark Kadlecik (United States)
Fifth official:
Josh Carson

Match rules

- 90 minutes.
- 20 minutes of extra time if necessary. Golden goal rule is in effect for extra time periods.
- Penalty shoot-out if scores still level.
- Unlimited substitutes.
- Substitutes that are subbed off in the first half cannot return until the second half. Substitutes that are subbed off in the second half can return once.

== See also ==
- 2015 NCAA Division I Men's Soccer Championship
- 2015 NCAA Division I men's soccer season
