= 2015 NCAA Division I men's soccer season =

American college soccer season

- Number of teams: 206
- TV partner/s: ESPNU, BTN, P12N, ACCN
- Hermann Trophy: Jordan Morris (Stanford)
- Top goalscorer: Gordon Wild (USC Upstate) (16 goals)

Statistics
- Biggest home win: VMI 0–11 UNC Greensboro (October 27)
- Biggest away win: USC Upstate 7–0 Presbyterian (September 5); UNC Greensboro 7–0 VMI (October 10)
- Highest scoring: VMI 0–11 UNC Greensboro (October 27)
- Longest winning run: 15 games Creighton (August 28 – October 28)
- Longest unbeaten run: 18 games Denver (August 29 – November 22)
- Longest winless run: 35 games VMI (since 9/12/2014)
- Longest losing run: 32 games VMI (since 9/23/14)
- Highest attendance: Home field–14,919 Cal Poly @ UC Santa Barbara (October 24); Neutral field–9,316 Army vs Navy @ Chester, PA (November 3)
- Lowest attendance: Home field–Several reported as 0– Probably incorrect, but official Neutral field–22 Missouri State v. Loyola Marymount @ New Mexico (September 18)

Tournament
- Duration: November 19 – December 13, 2015
- Most conference bids: ACC–7 bids American Athletic, Big Ten & Conference USA–4 bids

College Cup
- Date: December 13, 2015
- Site: Children's Mercy Park in Kansas City, Kansas
- Champions: Stanford
- Runners-up: Clemson

Seasons
- ← 2014 2016 →

The 2015 NCAA Division I men's soccer season was the 57th season of NCAA championship men's college soccer. The regular season began on August 28 and continues into November 2015. The season culminated with the 2015 NCAA Division I Men's Soccer Championship in December 2015. There were 206 teams in men's Division I competition. The defending champions were Virginia who defeated UCLA 0–0 (4–2 PKs) to win its seventh NCAA soccer title. The season concluded with Stanford defeating Clemson 4–0 to win its first championship.

== Changes from 2014 ==
=== Coaching changes ===
| Program | Outgoing coach | Manner of departure | Date of vacancy | Incoming coach | Date of appointment |
|---|---|---|---|---|---|
| Campbell | Steve Armas | Hired as an assistant at Wake Forest | May 7, 2015 | Dustin Fonder | June 9, 2015 |
| Cal Poly | Phil Ruskin | Interim, not retained | Was not announced | Steve Sampson | December 4, 2014 |
| Denver | Bobby Muuss | Head coach at Wake Forest | January 8, 2015 | Jamie Franks | January 30, 2015 |
| Drake | Sean Holmes | Fired | August 28, 2015 | Gareth Smith (Interim) | August 28, 2015 |
| Eastern Illinois | Mark Hansen | Not retained | Was not announced | Kiki Lara | March 10, 2015 |
| Evansville | Mike Jacobs | Resigned | November 2014 | Marshall Ray | December 8, 2014 |
| Grand Canyon | Petar Draksin | Relieved of duties | December 11, 2014 | Schellas Hyndman | January 13, 2015 |
| Green Bay | Dan Popik | Resigned | November 2014 | Jeremy Bonomo | March 8, 2015 |
| High Point | Dustin Fonder | Head coach at Campbell | June 9, 2015 | EJ O'Keeffe | July 22, 2015 |
| James Madison | Dr. Tom Martin | Retired | September 22, 2014 | Tom Foley | January 8, 2015 |
| UMass | Devin O'Neill | Interim not retained/to Western New England | March 5, 2015 | Fran O'Leary | February 11, 2015 |
| UNC Asheville | Matt Kern | Contract not renewed | November 20, 2014 | Mathes Mennell | February 11, 2015 |
| St. Bonaventure | Mel Mahler | Resigned | November 20, 2014 | Kwame Oduro | December 18, 2015 |
| SIU Edwardsville | David Korn & Brian Jones | Interim Co-head to Associate head coach Interim Co-head to Assistant, Saint Louis FC | December 5, 2014 | Mario Sanchez | January 27, 2015 |
| SMU | Tim McClements | Contract not renewed | January 9, 2015 | Kevin Hudson | January 9, 2015 |
| VMI | Richie Rose | Resigned | November 19, 2015 | Jon Freeman | January 7, 2015 |
| Wake Forest | Jay Vidovich | Head coach for the Portland Timbers 2 | December 18, 2014 | Bobby Muuss | January 8, 2015 |
| Yale | Brian Tompkins | Moved to administration | August 2014 | Kylie Stannard | December 29, 2014 |

=== New programs ===
- The University of Texas Rio Grande Valley (UTRGV), created for the 2015–16 school year with the merger of the University of Texas–Pan American (UTPA) and University of Texas at Brownsville (UTB), added the sport to the Division I athletic program it inherited from UTPA. Although UTB had a highly successful NAIA men's soccer team, the UTRGV program was created essentially from scratch, with an entirely new coaching staff and only two UTB players remaining in the UTRGV program. UTRGV also inherited UTPA's membership in the Western Athletic Conference.

=== Discontinued programs ===
None.

=== Conference realignment ===
| School | Previous Conference | New Conference |
|---|---|---|
| Northern Kentucky | Atlantic Sun Conference | Horizon League |

NJIT, previously the only Division I basketball independent, played the 2014 season as a single-sport member of the Sun Belt Conference. Although NJIT replaced Northern Kentucky in the Atlantic Sun Conference (A-Sun) in July 2015, the men's soccer team remained in the Sun Belt for the 2015 season due to contractual commitments to that league. NJIT men's soccer will join the A-Sun in 2016.

Additionally, the 2015 season was the last for Coastal Carolina in the Big South Conference. The Chanticleers will join the Sun Belt Conference on July 1, 2016, in all sports except football, with that team joining the conference a year later. The arrival of Coastal Carolina will maintain the Sun Belt at six men's soccer members, preserving the league's automatic NCAA tournament berth.

== Season overview ==
=== Pre-season polls ===
Several American soccer outlets posted their own preseason top 25 rankings of what were believed to be the strongest men's collegiate soccer teams entering 2015.

NSCAA
| Rank | Team |
|---|---|
| 1 | UCLA |
| 2 | Virginia |
| 3 | Georgetown |
| 4 | Notre Dame |
| 5 | North Carolina |
| 6 | Creighton |
| 7 | Providence |
| 8 | Stanford |
| 9 | Michigan State |
| 10 | Washington |
| 11 | Clemson |
| 12 | UMBC |
| 13 | Maryland |
| 14 | Indiana |
| 15 | Syracuse |
| 16 | California |
| 17 | Charlotte |
| 18 | Louisville |
| 19 | Xavier |
| 20 | UC Irvine |
| 21 | Coastal Carolina |
| 22 | Saint Louis |
| 23 | Penn State |
| 24 | Old Dominion |
| 25 | Akron |

College Soccer News
| Rank | Team |
|---|---|
| 1 | UCLA |
| 2 | Virginia |
| 3 | Georgetown |
| 4 | Creighton |
| 5 | Stanford |
| 6 | Providence |
| 7 | Notre Dame |
| 8 | Washington |
| 9 | Maryland |
| 10 | North Carolina |
| 11 | Clemson |
| 12 | Indiana |
| 13 | Michigan State |
| 14 | Charlotte |
| 15 | Louisville |
| 16 | California |
| 17 | UC Irvine |
| 18 | Xavier |
| 19 | Syracuse |
| 20 | UMBC |
| 21 | Coastal Carolina |
| 22 | Old Dominion |
| 23 | Saint Louis |
| 24 | Akron |
| 25 | Penn State |

Soccer America
| Rank | Team |
|---|---|
| 1 | UCLA |
| 2 | Virginia |
| 3 | Georgetown |
| 4 | Stanford |
| 5 | Creighton |
| 6 | Maryland |
| 7 | Providence |
| 8 | Clemson |
| 9 | North Carolina |
| 10 | Notre Dame |
| 11 | Louisville |
| 12 | Washington |
| 13 | Indiana |
| 14 | California |
| 15 | Charlotte |
| 16 | Syracuse |
| 17 | UC Santa Barbara |
| 18 | UC Irvine |
| 19 | Akron |
| 20 | Coastal Carolina |
| 21 | UConn |
| 22 | Xavier |
| 23 | Penn State |
| 24 | Delaware |
| 25 | Old Dominion |

Top Drawer Soccer
| Rank | Team |
|---|---|
| 1 | Virginia |
| 2 | UCLA |
| 3 | Georgetown |
| 4 | Stanford |
| 5 | Creighton |
| 6 | North Carolina |
| 7 | Notre Dame |
| 8 | Michigan State |
| 9 | California |
| 10 | Louisville |
| 11 | UC Irvine |
| 12 | Maryland |
| 13 | Clemson |
| 14 | Kentucky |
| 15 | Penn State |
| 16 | Xavier |
| 17 | Charlotte |
| 18 | Indiana |
| 19 | Saint Louis |
| 20 | Washington |
| 21 | Monmouth |
| 22 | Coastal Carolina |
| 23 | Syracuse |
| 24 | Providence |
| 25 | UMBC |

== Regular season ==
=== #1 ===
Weekly NSCAA #1 ranked team
| Date | Team | Date | Team | Date | Team | Date | Team |
|---|---|---|---|---|---|---|---|
| August 3 (preseason) | UCLA | None until after season starts | | September 1 | UCLA | September 8 | Creighton |
| September 15 | Creighton | September 22 | Creighton | September 29 | Creighton | October 6 | Creighton |
| October 13 | Creighton | October 20 | Creighton | October 27 | Creighton | November 3 | Wake Forest |
| November 10 | Wake Forest | November 17 | Wake Forest | None until after tournament | | December 15 | Stanford |

=== Standings ===
2015 America East Conference men's soccer standings
| | Conf. | | | | | Overall |
| Team | W | | L | | T | W | | L | | T |
|---|---|---|---|---|---|---|---|---|---|---|
| Albany | 5 | – | 2 | – | 0 | 10 | – | 8 | – | 1 |
| UMBC | 3 | – | 2 | – | 2 | 11 | – | 6 | – | 3 |
| Vermont ‡ | 3 | – | 2 | – | 2 | 11 | – | 7 | – | 3 |
| New Hampshire | 3 | – | 3 | – | 1 | 10 | – | 5 | – | 3 |
| Binghamton | 3 | – | 3 | – | 1 | 10 | – | 8 | – | 2 |
| Stony Brook | 3 | – | 3 | – | 1 | 7 | – | 8 | – | 3 |
| UMass Lowell ^{#} | 2 | – | 4 | – | 1 | 7 | – | 9 | – | 1 |
| Hartford | 1 | – | 4 | – | 2 | 5 | – | 7 | – | 5 |
‡ - Tournament champion +- Invited to the NCAA Division I Men's Soccer Championship ^{#}-Ineligible (In transition); As of November 20, 2015; Rankings from NSCAA

2015 American Athletic Conference men's soccer standings
| | Conf. | | | | | Overall |
| Team | W | | L | | T | W | | L | | T |
|---|---|---|---|---|---|---|---|---|---|---|
| No. 11 SMU + | 7 | – | 0 | – | 1 | 15 | – | 3 | – | 4 |
| No. 15 South Florida + | 5 | – | 1 | – | 2 | 11 | – | 6 | – | 3 |
| Connecticut + | 3 | – | 3 | – | 2 | 10 | – | 6 | – | 6 |
| Tulsa ‡ | 3 | – | 3 | – | 2 | 8 | – | 6 | – | 7 |
| UCF | 3 | – | 4 | – | 1 | 7 | – | 8 | – | 2 |
| Temple | 2 | – | 6 | – | 0 | 10 | – | 7 | – | 2 |
| Cincinnati | 1 | – | 4 | – | 3 | 7 | – | 9 | – | 3 |
| Memphis | 1 | – | 4 | – | 3 | 3 | – | 10 | – | 4 |
‡ - Tournament champion +- Invited to the NCAA Division I Men's Soccer Championship; As of November 29, 2015; Rankings from NSCAA

2015 Atlantic 10 Conference men's soccer standings
| | Conf. | | | | | Overall |
| Team | W | | L | | T | W | | L | | T |
|---|---|---|---|---|---|---|---|---|---|---|
| George Washington | 6 | – | 2 | – | 0 | 11 | – | 8 | – | 0 |
| Dayton ‡ | 5 | – | 1 | – | 2 | 13 | – | 5 | – | 5 |
| Saint Louis | 4 | – | 2 | – | 2 | 8 | – | 7 | – | 2 |
| Rhode Island | 4 | – | 3 | – | 1 | 10 | – | 8 | – | 2 |
| Fordham | 4 | – | 3 | – | 1 | 7 | – | 8 | – | 4 |
| Duquesne | 4 | – | 3 | – | 1 | 6 | – | 11 | – | 2 |
| UMass | 4 | – | 3 | – | 1 | 5 | – | 13 | – | 1 |
| VCU | 3 | – | 2 | – | 3 | 7 | – | 10 | – | 4 |
| George Mason | 3 | – | 3 | – | 2 | 7 | – | 8 | – | 2 |
| Saint Joseph's | 3 | – | 4 | – | 1 | 4 | – | 12 | – | 2 |
| LaSalle | 2 | – | 5 | – | 1 | 6 | – | 10 | – | 2 |
| Davidson | 2 | – | 6 | – | 0 | 5 | – | 10 | – | 3 |
| St. Bonaventure | 1 | – | 7 | – | 0 | 2 | – | 16 | – | 1 |
‡-Tournament champion +- Invited to the NCAA Division I Men's Soccer Championship; As of November 22, 2015; Rankings from NSCAA

2015 ACC men's soccer standings
| | Conf. | | | | | Overall |
| Team | W | | L | | T | W | | L | | T |
|---|---|---|---|---|---|---|---|---|---|---|
Atlantic
| No. 1 Wake Forest + | 6 | – | 0 | – | 2 | 17 | – | 3 | – | 2 |
| No. 3 Clemson + | 6 | – | 1 | – | 1 | 16 | – | 2 | – | 3 |
| Boston College + | 4 | – | 4 | – | 0 | 11 | – | 8 | – | 2 |
| No. 6 Syracuse ‡ | 3 | – | 4 | – | 1 | 16 | – | 5 | – | 3 |
| Louisville | 1 | – | 4 | – | 3 | 7 | – | 9 | – | 3 |
| NC State | 1 | – | 4 | – | 3 | 8 | – | 6 | – | 3 |
Coastal
| No. 4 North Carolina + | 6 | – | 1 | – | 1 | 15 | – | 2 | – | 3 |
| No. 8 Notre Dame + | 4 | – | 2 | – | 2 | 11 | – | 5 | – | 6 |
| No. 18 Virginia + | 4 | – | 2 | – | 2 | 10 | – | 5 | – | 3 |
| Duke | 3 | – | 4 | – | 1 | 10 | – | 7 | – | 2 |
| Virginia Tech | 0 | – | 5 | – | 3 | 5 | – | 9 | – | 3 |
| Pittsburgh | 0 | – | 7 | – | 1 | 5 | – | 9 | – | 3 |
‡ - ACC Tournament champion + - Invited to the NCAA Division I Men's Soccer Championship; As of December 5, 2015; Rankings from NSCAA

2015 Atlantic Sun Conference men's soccer standings
| | Conf. | | | | | Overall |
| Team | W | | L | | T | W | | L | | T |
|---|---|---|---|---|---|---|---|---|---|---|
| North Florida ‡ | 4 | – | 0 | – | 1 | 10 | – | 7 | – | 1 |
| Florida Gulf Coast | 4 | – | 0 | – | 1 | 7 | – | 4 | – | 3 |
| Lipscomb | 3 | – | 2 | – | 0 | 6 | – | 10 | – | 1 |
| USC Upstate | 2 | – | 3 | – | 1 | 7 | – | 7 | – | 1 |
| Jacksonville | 1 | – | 5 | – | 0 | 3 | – | 12 | – | 1 |
| Stetson | 0 | – | 4 | – | 1 | 5 | – | 9 | – | 2 |
‡-Tournament champion +- Invited to the NCAA Division I Men's Soccer Championship; As of November 20, 2015; Rankings from NSCAA

2015 Big East Conference men's soccer standings
| | Conf. | | | | | Overall |
| Team | W | | L | | T | W | | L | | T |
|---|---|---|---|---|---|---|---|---|---|---|
| No. 2 Georgetown ‡ | 9 | – | 0 | – | 0 | 16 | – | 2 | – | 3 |
| No. 9 Creighton + | 7 | – | 2 | – | 0 | 19 | – | 4 | – | 0 |
| Butler | 6 | – | 3 | – | 0 | 10 | – | 4 | – | 4 |
| Xavier | 5 | – | 3 | – | 1 | 11 | – | 6 | – | 1 |
| Providence | 4 | – | 4 | – | 1 | 8 | – | 7 | – | 2 |
| DePaul | 4 | – | 4 | – | 1 | 5 | – | 12 | – | 1 |
| Villanova | 4 | – | 5 | – | 0 | 9 | – | 8 | – | 0 |
| Saint John's | 2 | – | 5 | – | 2 | 4 | – | 11 | – | 3 |
| Marquette | 1 | – | 7 | – | 1 | 5 | – | 10 | – | 2 |
| Seton Hall | 0 | – | 9 | – | 0 | 0 | – | 15 | – | 1 |
‡-Tournament champion +- Invited to the NCAA Division I Men's Soccer Championship; As of December 5, 2015; Rankings from NSCAA

2015 Big South Conference men's soccer standings
| | Conf. | | | | | Overall |
| Team | W | | L | | T | W | | L | | T |
|---|---|---|---|---|---|---|---|---|---|---|
| Winthrop ‡ | 7 | – | 1 | – | 1 | 11 | – | 7 | – | 2 |
| Radford + | 7 | – | 1 | – | 1 | 14 | – | 4 | – | 2 |
| No. 20 Coastal Carolina + | 6 | – | 1 | – | 3 | 13 | – | 3 | – | 3 |
| Campbell | 5 | – | 4 | – | 0 | 10 | – | 9 | – | 0 |
| Longwood | 4 | – | 4 | – | 1 | 9 | – | 9 | – | 1 |
| High Point | 3 | – | 3 | – | 3 | 8 | – | 6 | – | 7 |
| Gardner–Webb | 3 | – | 6 | – | 0 | 4 | – | 14 | – | 0 |
| UNC Asheville | 3 | – | 6 | – | 0 | 6 | – | 12 | – | 1 |
| Liberty | 2 | – | 6 | – | 1 | 6 | – | 10 | – | 1 |
| Presbyterian | 0 | – | 8 | – | 1 | 0 | – | 16 | – | 1 |
‡-Tournament champion +- Invited to the NCAA Division I Men's Soccer Championship; As of November 22, 2015; Rankings from NSCAA

2015 Big Ten Conference men's soccer standings
| | Conf. | | | | | Overall |
| Team | W | | L | | T | W | | L | | T |
|---|---|---|---|---|---|---|---|---|---|---|
| No. 14 Ohio State + | 5 | – | 2 | – | 1 | 14 | – | 7 | – | 4 |
| No. 19 Indiana + | 4 | – | 3 | – | 1 | 13 | – | 5 | – | 3 |
| No. 12 Maryland ‡ | 3 | – | 2 | – | 3 | 12 | – | 5 | – | 6 |
| No. 23 Rutgers + | 4 | – | 4 | – | 0 | 12 | – | 7 | – | 2 |
| Northwestern | 4 | – | 4 | – | 0 | 7 | – | 9 | – | 2 |
| Michigan | 3 | – | 3 | – | 2 | 8 | – | 6 | – | 4 |
| Wisconsin | 2 | – | 3 | – | 3 | 5 | – | 11 | – | 3 |
| Penn State | 2 | – | 4 | – | 2 | 7 | – | 8 | – | 3 |
| Michigan St. | 2 | – | 4 | – | 2 | 8 | – | 9 | – | 2 |
‡-Tournament champion +- Invited to the NCAA Division I Men's Soccer Championship; As of December 4, 2015; Rankings from NSCAA

2015 Big West Conference men's soccer standings
| | Conf. | | | | | Overall |
| Team | W | | L | | T | W | | L | | T |
|---|---|---|---|---|---|---|---|---|---|---|
North
| No. 22UC Santa Barbara+ | 7 | – | 2 | – | 1 | 14 | – | 7 | – | 2 |
| Cal Poly + | 5 | – | 1 | – | 4 | 11 | – | 5 | – | 5 |
| UC Davis | 3 | – | 4 | – | 3 | 8 | – | 10 | – | 3 |
| Sacramento State | 3 | – | 6 | – | 1 | 6 | – | 10 | – | 2 |
South
| No. 24Cal St. Fullerton‡ | 6 | – | 3 | – | 1 | 13 | – | 8 | – | 1 |
| CSU Northridge | 4 | – | 4 | – | 2 | 8 | – | 8 | – | 3 |
| UC Irvine | 3 | – | 5 | – | 2 | 5 | – | 11 | – | 4 |
| UC Riverside | 2 | – | 8 | – | 0 | 6 | – | 12 | – | 1 |
‡-Tournament champion +- Invited to the NCAA Division I Men's Soccer Championship; As of November 29, 2015; Rankings from NSCAA

2015 Colonial Athletic Association men's soccer standings
| | Conf. | | | | | Overall |
| Team | W | | L | | T | W | | L | | T |
|---|---|---|---|---|---|---|---|---|---|---|
| Hofstra ‡ | 6 | – | 2 | – | 0 | 14 | – | 8 | – | 0 |
| Elon + | 6 | – | 2 | – | 0 | 14 | – | 6 | – | 1 |
| Delaware | 5 | – | 2 | – | 1 | 10 | – | 7 | – | 4 |
| Charleston | 4 | – | 3 | – | 1 | 7 | – | 8 | – | 2 |
| UNC Wilmington | 3 | – | 3 | – | 2 | 8 | – | 8 | – | 3 |
| James Madison | 3 | – | 3 | – | 2 | 5 | – | 10 | – | 4 |
| William & Mary | 2 | – | 6 | – | 0 | 7 | – | 8 | – | 2 |
| Northeastern | 2 | – | 6 | – | 0 | 3 | – | 12 | – | 2 |
| Drexel | 2 | – | 6 | – | 0 | 3 | – | 15 | – | 1 |
‡-Tournament champion +- Invited to the NCAA Division I Men's Soccer Championship; As of November 22, 2015; Rankings from NSCAA

2015 Conference USA men's soccer standings
| | Conf. | | | | | Overall |
| Team | W | | L | | T | W | | L | | T |
|---|---|---|---|---|---|---|---|---|---|---|
| No. 17 Kentucky + | 7 | – | 0 | – | 1 | 12 | – | 5 | – | 2 |
| Charlotte + | 6 | – | 1 | – | 1 | 10 | – | 6 | – | 2 |
| No. 21 South Carolina + | 6 | – | 2 | – | 0 | 11 | – | 8 | – | 2 |
| Old Dominion | 3 | – | 3 | – | 2 | 8 | – | 5 | – | 3 |
| No. 16 Fla. International ‡ | 3 | – | 4 | – | 1 | 12 | – | 7 | – | 1 |
| New Mexico | 2 | – | 4 | – | 2 | 8 | – | 6 | – | 4 |
| Marshall | 2 | – | 5 | – | 1 | 8 | – | 9 | – | 1 |
| UAB | 2 | – | 6 | – | 0 | 5 | – | 11 | – | 0 |
| Florida Atlantic | 1 | – | 7 | – | 0 | 2 | – | 12 | – | 2 |
‡-Tournament champion +- Invited to the NCAA Division I Men's Soccer Championship; As of November 22, 2015; Rankings from NSCAA

2015 Horizon League men's soccer standings
| | Conf. | | | | | Overall |
| Team | W | | L | | T | W | | L | | T |
|---|---|---|---|---|---|---|---|---|---|---|
| UIC | 6 | – | 1 | – | 2 | 9 | – | 6 | – | 3 |
| Oakland ‡ | 5 | – | 3 | – | 1 | 10 | – | 8 | – | 2 |
| Northern Kentucky ^{#} | 4 | – | 2 | – | 3 | 8 | – | 7 | – | 4 |
| Cleveland State | 4 | – | 3 | – | 2 | 9 | – | 8 | – | 2 |
| Detroit | 3 | – | 1 | – | 5 | 7 | – | 5 | – | 8 |
| Wright State | 4 | – | 4 | – | 1 | 12 | – | 8 | – | 1 |
| Valparaiso | 3 | – | 3 | – | 3 | 7 | – | 6 | – | 5 |
| Green Bay | 2 | – | 5 | – | 2 | 5 | – | 10 | – | 3 |
| Milwaukee | 2 | – | 5 | – | 2 | 5 | – | 10 | – | 3 |
| Belmont | 1 | – | 7 | – | 1 | 4 | – | 13 | – | 2 |
‡-Tournament champion +-Invited to the NCAA Division I Men's Soccer Championship ^{#} – Ineligible (In transition); As of November 20, 2015; Rankings from NSCAA

2015 Ivy League men's soccer standings
| | Conf. | | | | | Overall |
| Team | W | | L | | T | W | | L | | T |
|---|---|---|---|---|---|---|---|---|---|---|
| Dartmouth ‡ | 6 | – | 1 | – | 0 | 12 | – | 6 | – | 1 |
| Harvard | 5 | – | 2 | – | 0 | 9 | – | 6 | – | 2 |
| Brown | 4 | – | 1 | – | 2 | 10 | – | 5 | – | 2 |
| Columbia | 4 | – | 3 | – | 0 | 10 | – | 5 | – | 1 |
| Princeton | 3 | – | 3 | – | 1 | 10 | – | 5 | – | 2 |
| Cornell | 2 | – | 5 | – | 0 | 4 | – | 13 | – | 0 |
| Penn | 1 | – | 5 | – | 1 | 3 | – | 11 | – | 2 |
| Yale | 0 | – | 5 | – | 2 | 1 | – | 14 | – | 2 |
‡-Conference champion; As of November 22, 2015; Rankings from NSCAA

2015 Metro Atlantic Athletic Conference men's soccer standings
| | Conf. | | | | | Overall |
| Team | W | | L | | T | W | | L | | T |
|---|---|---|---|---|---|---|---|---|---|---|
| Monmouth | 7 | – | 0 | – | 3 | 13 | – | 4 | – | 4 |
| Rider ‡ | 6 | – | 3 | – | 1 | 14 | – | 6 | – | 1 |
| Iona | 5 | – | 3 | – | 2 | 10 | – | 7 | – | 3 |
| Marist | 5 | – | 3 | – | 2 | 7 | – | 9 | – | 2 |
| Fairfield | 5 | – | 3 | – | 2 | 6 | – | 6 | – | 6 |
| Siena | 5 | – | 4 | – | 1 | 8 | – | 10 | – | 3 |
| Canisius | 5 | – | 5 | – | 0 | 8 | – | 9 | – | 1 |
| Saint Peter's | 4 | – | 5 | – | 1 | 7 | – | 9 | – | 2 |
| Manhattan | 3 | – | 6 | – | 1 | 4 | – | 11 | – | 2 |
| Quinnipiac | 1 | – | 5 | – | 4 | 2 | – | 11 | – | 6 |
| Niagara | 0 | – | 9 | – | 1 | 1 | – | 16 | – | 3 |
‡-2015 MAAC Tournament Champion +- Invited to the NCAA Division I Men's Soccer Championship; As of November 20, 2015; Rankings from NSCAA

2015 Mid-American Conference men's soccer standings
| | Conf. | | | | | Overall |
| Team | W | | L | | T | W | | L | | T |
|---|---|---|---|---|---|---|---|---|---|---|
| No. 5 Akron ‡ | 4 | – | 0 | – | 1 | 18 | – | 3 | – | 2 |
| Western Michigan | 3 | – | 1 | – | 1 | 10 | – | 4 | – | 4 |
| Buffalo | 2 | – | 2 | – | 1 | 8 | – | 7 | – | 4 |
| West Virginia | 2 | – | 3 | – | 0 | 6 | – | 12 | – | 0 |
| Northern Illinois | 1 | – | 3 | – | 1 | 7 | – | 6 | – | 1 |
| Bowling Green | 1 | – | 4 | – | 0 | 9 | – | 9 | – | 1 |
‡-Tournament Champion +-Invited to the NCAA Division I Men's Soccer Championship; As of December 5, 2015; Rankings from NSCAA

2015 Missouri Valley Conference men's soccer standings
| | Conf. | | | | | Overall |
| Team | W | | L | | T | W | | L | | T |
|---|---|---|---|---|---|---|---|---|---|---|
| SIUE | 5 | – | 1 | – | 0 | 12 | – | 5 | – | 2 |
| Bradley | 4 | – | 1 | – | 1 | 7 | – | 10 | – | 1 |
| Drake ‡ | 3 | – | 1 | – | 2 | 13 | – | 5 | – | 3 |
| Missouri State | 3 | – | 2 | – | 1 | 6 | – | 6 | – | 5 |
| Loyola Chicago | 2 | – | 2 | – | 2 | 10 | – | 4 | – | 5 |
| Central Arkansas | 1 | – | 5 | – | 0 | 2 | – | 15 | – | 1 |
| Evansville | 0 | – | 6 | – | 0 | 3 | – | 13 | – | 0 |
‡-MVC Tournament Champion +-Invited to the NCAA Division I Men's Soccer Championship; As of November 22, 2015; Rankings from NSCAA

2015 Northeast Conference men's soccer standings
| | Conf. | | | | | Overall |
| Team | W | | L | | T | W | | L | | T |
|---|---|---|---|---|---|---|---|---|---|---|
| LIU Brooklyn ‡ | 7 | – | 0 | – | 0 | 11 | – | 5 | – | 5 |
| Saint Francis (PA) | 5 | – | 2 | – | 0 | 11 | – | 5 | – | 4 |
| Robert Morris | 4 | – | 2 | – | 1 | 10 | – | 8 | – | 1 |
| St. Francis Brooklyn | 3 | – | 2 | – | 2 | 10 | – | 3 | – | 5 |
| Central Connecticut | 3 | – | 4 | – | 0 | 6 | – | 9 | – | 2 |
| Bryant | 1 | – | 3 | – | 3 | 3 | – | 8 | – | 5 |
| Sacred Heart | 1 | – | 6 | – | 0 | 2 | – | 12 | – | 1 |
| Fairleigh Dickinson | 0 | – | 5 | – | 2 | 2 | – | 12 | – | 3 |
‡-Tournament champion + - Invited to the NCAA Division I Men's Soccer Championship; As of November 20, 2015; Rankings from NSCAA

2015 Pac-12 Conference men's soccer standings
| | Conf. | | | | | Overall |
| Team | W | | L | | T | W | | L | | T |
|---|---|---|---|---|---|---|---|---|---|---|
| No. 7 Stanford ‡ | 7 | – | 1 | – | 2 | 17 | – | 2 | – | 2 |
| No. 25 UCLA + | 5 | – | 4 | – | 1 | 11 | – | 9 | – | 1 |
| Washington | 4 | – | 3 | – | 3 | 8 | – | 5 | – | 6 |
| California | 4 | – | 4 | – | 2 | 9 | – | 6 | – | 2 |
| Oregon State | 3 | – | 6 | – | 1 | 8 | – | 9 | – | 1 |
| San Diego State | 2 | – | 7 | – | 1 | 8 | – | 8 | – | 3 |
‡-Conference champion + - Invited to the NCAA Division I Men's Soccer Championship; As of December 5, 2015; Rankings from NSCAA

2015 Patriot League men's soccer standings
| | Conf. | | | | | Overall |
| Team | W | | L | | T | W | | L | | T |
|---|---|---|---|---|---|---|---|---|---|---|
| Colgate | 7 | – | 2 | – | 0 | 10 | – | 7 | – | 2 |
| Boston U. + | 6 | – | 1 | – | 2 | 12 | – | 6 | – | 2 |
| American | 5 | – | 2 | – | 2 | 14 | – | 5 | – | 3 |
| Lehigh ‡ | 4 | – | 3 | – | 2 | 13 | – | 6 | – | 3 |
| Bucknell | 3 | – | 3 | – | 3 | 7 | – | 7 | – | 5 |
| Army | 3 | – | 3 | – | 3 | 5 | – | 8 | – | 5 |
| Navy | 4 | – | 5 | – | 0 | 8 | – | 9 | – | 1 |
| Holy Cross | 3 | – | 4 | – | 2 | 6 | – | 8 | – | 4 |
| Lafayette | 2 | – | 6 | – | 1 | 5 | – | 8 | – | 5 |
| Loyola (MD) | 0 | – | 8 | – | 1 | 2 | – | 13 | – | 2 |
‡-Tournament Champion +-Invited to the NCAA Division I Men's Soccer Championship; As of November 20, 2015; Rankings from NSCAA

2015 Southern Conference men's soccer standings
| | Conf. | | | | | Overall |
| Team | W | | L | | T | W | | L | | T |
|---|---|---|---|---|---|---|---|---|---|---|
| UNC Greensboro | 6 | – | 1 | – | 3 | 11 | – | 5 | – | 5 |
| Furman ‡ | 6 | – | 2 | – | 2 | 8 | – | 5 | – | 6 |
| Mercer | 5 | – | 3 | – | 2 | 11 | – | 6 | – | 3 |
| East Tenn. State | 4 | – | 4 | – | 2 | 8 | – | 7 | – | 4 |
| Wofford | 4 | – | 5 | – | 1 | 9 | – | 7 | – | 2 |
| VMI | 0 | – | 10 | – | 0 | 0 | – | 19 | – | 0 |
‡-Tournament Champion +-Invited to the NCAA Division I Men's Soccer Championship; As of November 20, 2015; Rankings from NSCAA

2015 Summit League men's soccer standings
| | Conf. | | | | | Overall |
| Team | W | | L | | T | W | | L | | T |
|---|---|---|---|---|---|---|---|---|---|---|
| No. 10 Denver ‡ | 5 | – | 0 | – | 1 | 15 | – | 1 | – | 3 |
| Omaha | 3 | – | 2 | – | 1 | 9 | – | 6 | – | 3 |
| Oral Roberts | 3 | – | 2 | – | 1 | 7 | – | 7 | – | 4 |
| Western Illinois | 3 | – | 3 | – | 0 | 6 | – | 12 | – | 1 |
| IUPUI | 1 | – | 2 | – | 3 | 1 | – | 9 | – | 7 |
| Fort Wayne | 2 | – | 4 | – | 0 | 5 | – | 12 | – | 0 |
| Eastern Illinois | 1 | – | 5 | – | 0 | 3 | – | 14 | – | 0 |
‡-Tournament Champion +-Invited to the NCAA Division I Men's Soccer Championship; As of November 22, 2015; Rankings from NSCAA

2015 Sun Belt Conference men's soccer standings
| | Conf. | | | | | Overall |
| Team | W | | L | | T | W | | L | | T |
|---|---|---|---|---|---|---|---|---|---|---|
| Hartwick ‡ | 5 | – | 0 | – | 0 | 11 | – | 6 | – | 3 |
| Georgia State | 4 | – | 1 | – | 0 | 9 | – | 8 | – | 1 |
| Georgia Southern | 3 | – | 2 | – | 0 | 6 | – | 8 | – | 2 |
| Appalachian State | 2 | – | 3 | – | 0 | 8 | – | 10 | – | 0 |
| NJIT | 1 | – | 4 | – | 0 | 5 | – | 10 | – | 4 |
| Howard | 0 | – | 5 | – | 0 | 0 | – | 17 | – | 2 |
‡-Tournament Champion +-Invited to the NCAA Division I Men's Soccer Championship; As of November 20, 2015; Rankings from NSCAA

2015 West Coast Conference men's soccer standings
| | Conf. | | | | | Overall |
| Team | W | | L | | T | W | | L | | T |
|---|---|---|---|---|---|---|---|---|---|---|
| Santa Clara ‡ | 5 | – | 1 | – | 1 | 11 | – | 8 | – | 1 |
| San Diego | 5 | – | 1 | – | 1 | 10 | – | 5 | – | 3 |
| Saint Mary's | 5 | – | 2 | – | 0 | 8 | – | 9 | – | 1 |
| San Francisco | 4 | – | 2 | – | 1 | 6 | – | 11 | – | 1 |
| Loyola Marymount | 4 | – | 3 | – | 0 | 9 | – | 9 | – | 0 |
| Gonzaga | 2 | – | 5 | – | 0 | 7 | – | 10 | – | 1 |
| Portland | 1 | – | 6 | – | 0 | 3 | – | 12 | – | 3 |
| Pacific | 0 | – | 6 | – | 1 | 1 | – | 15 | – | 1 |
‡-Conference champion + - Invited to the NCAA Division I Men's Soccer Championship; As of November 22, 2015; Rankings from NSCAA

2015 Western Athletic Conference men's soccer standings
| | Conf. | | | | | Overall |
| Team | W | | L | | T | W | | L | | T |
|---|---|---|---|---|---|---|---|---|---|---|
| No. 13 Seattle ‡ | 9 | – | 1 | – | 0 | 18 | – | 4 | – | 1 |
| Utah Valley + | 6 | – | 3 | – | 1 | 14 | – | 6 | – | 2 |
| UNLV | 5 | – | 4 | – | 1 | 12 | – | 7 | – | 1 |
| Houston Baptist | 5 | – | 4 | – | 1 | 9 | – | 8 | – | 2 |
| Cal St. Bakersfield | 4 | – | 3 | – | 3 | 7 | – | 6 | – | 6 |
| San Jose State | 4 | – | 4 | – | 2 | 6 | – | 11 | – | 1 |
| Air Force | 4 | – | 5 | – | 1 | 7 | – | 9 | – | 1 |
| UMKC | 4 | – | 5 | – | 1 | 6 | – | 9 | – | 2 |
| Incarnate Word ^{#} | 4 | – | 6 | – | 0 | 8 | – | 8 | – | 0 |
| Grand Canyon ^{#} | 3 | – | 7 | – | 0 | 7 | – | 10 | – | 0 |
| UTRGV | 2 | – | 8 | – | 0 | 5 | – | 12 | – | 1 |
‡-Tournament Champion + - Invited to the NCAA Division I Men's Soccer Championship ^{#}-Ineligible (In transition); As of November 29, 2015; Rankings from NSCAA

=== Major upsets ===
In this list, a "major upset" is defined as a game won by a team ranked 10 or more spots lower or an unranked team that defeats a team ranked #15 or higher.

| Date | Winner | Score | Loser |
|---|---|---|---|
| August 28 | @ UC Santa Barbara | 1–0 | #8 Stanford |
| August 30 | @ Oregon State | 1–0 | #9 Michigan State |
| August 31 | @ South Florida | 2–0 | #3 Georgetown |
| September 3 | @ Lipscomb | 2–1 | #10 Xavier |
| September 4 | Akron | 1–0 | @ #12 Georgetown |
| September 4 | @ Omaha | 1–0 | # 13 UC Irvine |
| September 6 | Virginia Tech | 3–1 | @ #10 Xavier |
| September 7 | Akron | 3–2 | @ #6 Maryland |
| September 13 | UC Riverside | 2–1 | @ #8 UCLA |
| September 13 | @ Penn State | 1–0 | #10 Indiana |
| September 15 | Xavier | 1–0 | @ #2 Notre Dame |
| September 15 | #20 Elon | 1–0 | @ #7 Wake Forest |
| September 17 | @ Portland | 1–0 | #8 Oregon State |
| September 22 | @ South Carolina | 3–1 | #8 Elon |
| September 22 | @ Gonzaga | 2–1 | #13 Oregon State |
| September 23 | @ #25 Georgetown | 2–1 | #11 Maryland |
| September 24 | @ Seattle | 2–1 | #10 Washington |
| September 25 | @ South Carolina | 2–1 | #7 New Mexico |
| September 25 | Seattle | 2–1 | @ #13 Oregon State |
| September 30 | @ William & Mary | 4–1 | #10 Elon |
| October 4 | UCLA | 3–2 | @ #15 Washington |
| October 9 | @ Boston College | 2–1 | #10 Virginia |
| October 11 | @ UNC Asheville | 3–2 | #4 Coastal Carolina |
| October 14 | @ Sacramento State | 5–2 | #14 UC Santa Barbara |
| October 17 | @ FIU | 2–1 | #9 Old Dominion |
| October 17 | @ Cal Poly | 3–2 ^{(2ot)} | #14 UC Santa Barbara |
| October 20 | @ Duke | 2–1 ^{(ot)} | #10 Elon |
| October 28 | Xavier | 2–1 | @ #1 Creighton |
| October 30 | @ Boston College | 2–1 | #12 Syracuse |
| October 31 | @ UConn | 2–1 ^{(ot)} | #11 South Florida |
| October 31 | @ South Carolina | 3–1 | #13 Old Dominion |
| November 1 | #25 UCLA | 4–2 | @ #6 Akron |
| October 2 | @ Washington | 2–1 | #4 Stanford |

== Statistics ==
=== Individuals ===
GOALS
| Rank | Scorer | School | Games | Goals |
|---|---|---|---|---|
| 1 | David Olsen | Seattle | 23 | 16 |
| | Gordon Wild | USC Upstate | 15 | 16 |
| 3 | Nick DePuy | UC Santa Barbara | 23 | 15 |
| | Bradley Farias | Campbell | 19 | 15 |
| | Fabian Herbers | Creighton | 23 | 15 |
| 6 | Danny Musovski | UNLV | 20 | 14 |
| 7 | Amass Amankona | Dayton | 23 | 13 |
| | Neco Brett | Robert Morris | 18 | 13 |
| | Sivert Daehlie | Radford | 19 | 13 |
| | Jorge Gomez Sanchez | Temple | 18 | 13 |
| | Max Hasenstab | Winthrop | 18 | 13 |
| | Willy Miezan | Longwood | 19 | 13 |
| | Jordan Morris | Stanford | 18 | 13 |
| | Colin Phillips | Duquesne | 18 | 13 |
| | Thomas Sanner | Princeton | 17 | 13 |
| | Mac Steeves | Providence | 18 | 13 |
| | Jason Wright | Rutgers | 21 | 13 |

Last update on December 14, 2015.

GOALS AGAINST AVERAGE
| Rank | Keeper | School | Games | Minutes | GA | GAA |
|---|---|---|---|---|---|---|
| 1 | Drew Shepherd | Western Michigan | 13 | 1101 | 4 | .327 |
| 2 | Tim Dobrowolski | Loyola Chicago | 19 | 1806 | 8 | .399 |
| 3 | Dan Jackson | Denver | 19 | 1794 | 8 | .401 |
| 4 | Jack Binks | St. Francis Brooklyn | 18 | 1769 | 8 | .407 |
| 5 | Kyle Dal Santo | SIUE | 18 | 1652 | 9 | .490 |
| 6 | Logan Keys | LIU Brooklyn | 14 | 1357 | 8 | .530 |
| 7 | Stefan Cleveland | Dartmouth | 15 | 1297 | 9 | .625 |
| 8 | Dallas Jaye | Xavier | 14 | 1289 | 9 | .628 |
| 9 | Ryan Herman | Washington | 18 | 1711 | 12 | .631 |
| 10 | Andrew Epstein | Stanford | 23 | 2138 | 15 | .631 |

Last update on December 14, 2015.

ASSISTS
| Rank | Player | School | Games | Assists |
|---|---|---|---|---|
| 1 | Fabian Herbers | Creighton | 23 | 17 |
| 2 | Corey Baird | Stanford | 23 | 13 |
| 2 | Joey Piatczyc | West Virginia | 19 | 13 |
| | Eric Verso | Stanford | 23 | 13 |
| 5 | Kwame Awuah | UConn | 22 | 12 |
| | Mael Corboz | Maryland | 23 | 12 |
| | Aaron Meyer | Utah Valley | 19 | 12 |
| 8 | Julian Büscher | Syracuse | 25 | 11 |
| | Julian Gressel | Providence | 18 | 11 |
| | Jack Harrison | Wake Forest | 19 | 11 |
| | Alex Muyl | Georgetown | 21 | 11 |
| | Adam Najem | Akron | 24 | 11 |
| | Liam Robley | American | 20 | 11 |

Last update on December 14, 2015

SAVE PERCENTAGE
| Rank | Keeper | School | Games | Saves | GA | Save % |
|---|---|---|---|---|---|---|
| 1 | Dominik Reining | Marshall | 11 | 59 | 7 | .894 |
| 2 | Drew Shepherd | Western Michigan | 13 | 29 | 4 | .879 |
| 3 | Ryan Herman | Washington | 18 | 85 | 12 | .876 |
| 4 | Logan Keys | LIU Brooklyn | 14 | 55 | 8 | .873 |
| 5 | Stefan Cleveland | Dartmouth | 15 | 58 | 9 | .866 |
| 6 | Jack Binks | St. Francis Brooklyn | 18 | 47 | 8 | .855 |
| 7 | Joseph Kuta | Buffalo | 11 | 58 | 10 | .853 |
| 8 | Alec Ferrell | Wake Forest | 18 | 66 | 12 | .846 |
| 9 | James Pyle | North Carolina | 15 | 47 | 9 | .839 |
| 10 | Dan Jackson | Denver | 19 | 40 | 8 | .833 |
| | Kyle Dal Santo | SIUE | 18 | 45 | 9 | .833 |

Last update on December 14, 2015

TOTAL POINTS
| Rank | Player | School | Games | Goals | Assists | Points |
|---|---|---|---|---|---|---|
| 1 | Fabian Herbers | Creighton | 23 | 15 | 17 | 47 |
| 2 | Bradley Farias | Campbell | 19 | 15 | 5 | 35 |
| 3 | Gordon Wild | USC Upstate | 15 | 16 | 2 | 34 |
| 4 | David Olsen | Seattle | 23 | 16 | 1 | 33 |
| | Danny Musovski | UNLV | 20 | 14 | 5 | 33 |
| 6 | Russell Cicerone | Buffalo | 18 | 12 | 8 | 32 |
| 7 | Nick DePuy | UC Santa Barbara | 23 | 15 | 1 | 31 |
| | Amass Amankona | Dayton | 23 | 13 | 5 | 31 |
| | Neco Brett | Robert Morris | 18 | 13 | 5 | 31 |
| | Jorge Gomez Sanchez | Temple | 18 | 13 | 5 | 31 |
| | Colin Phillips | Duquesne | 18 | 13 | 5 | 31 |
| | Thomas Sanner | Princeton | 17 | 13 | 5 | 31 |
| | Jason Wright | Rutgers | 21 | 13 | 5 | 31 |
| | Brandon Allen | Georgetown | 21 | 11 | 7 | 31 |
| | Adam Najem | Akron | 24 | 10 | 11 | 31 |

Last update on December 14, 2015

TOTAL SAVES
| Rank | Keeper | School | Games | Saves |
|---|---|---|---|---|
| 1 | Alex Guerra | VMI | 19 | 127 |
| 2 | Brenden Alfery | Robert Morris | 19 | 112 |
| 3 | Jake Fenlason | Akron | 24 | 105 |
| 4 | Patric Pray | Hofstra | 22 | 98 |
| 5 | Zack Davis | UNC Asheville | 17 | 96 |
| 6 | Eduardo Cortes | IUPUI | 17 | 95 |
| 7 | Harrison Veith | Central Arkansas | 18 | 91 |
| 8 | Michael Nelson | SMU | 22 | 90 |
| 9 | Bobby Diaz | St. Bonaventure | 14 | 89 |
| | Kody Palmer | High Point | 21 | 89 |

Last update on December 14, 2015

=== Teams ===
SCORING OFFENSE
| Rank | School | Games | Goals | Goals/Game |
|---|---|---|---|---|
| 1 | Dayton | 23 | 58 | 2.522 |
| 2 | Akron | 24 | 56 | 2.333 |
| 3 | Creighton | 23 | 53 | 2.304 |
| 4 | Georgia State | 18 | 41 | 2.278 |
| 5 | UCLA | 21 | 47 | 2.338 |
| 6 | Radford | 20 | 44 | 2.200 |
| 7 | UNC Greensboro | 21 | 46 | 2.190 |
| 8 | Wake Forest | 22 | 48 | 2.182 |
| 9 | Clemson | 24 | 52 | 2.167 |
| 10 | Seattle | 23 | 49 | 2.130 |

Last update on December 14, 2015

SCORING DEFENSE (Team Goals Against Average)
| Rank | School | Games | Minutes | GA | Team GAA |
|---|---|---|---|---|---|
| 1 | Loyola Chicago | 19 | 1833 | 8 | .393 |
| 2 | Denver | 19 | 1794 | 8 | .401 |
| 3 | St. Francis Brooklyn | 18 | 1785 | 8 | .403 |
| 4 | Western Michigan | 19 | 1798 | 10 | .501 |
| 5 | Wake Forest | 22 | 2029 | 13 | .577 |
| 6 | Stanford | 23 | 2164 | 15 | .624 |
| 7 | Washington | 19 | 1846 | 13 | .634 |
| 8 | SIUE | 18 | 1697 | 12 | .636 |
| 9 | Kentucky | 19 | 1783 | 13 | .656 |
| 10 | Coastal Carolina | 20 | 1905 | 14 | .661 |

Last update on December 14, 2015

SHUTOUT PERCENTAGE
| Rank | School | Games | Shutouts | Shutout % |
|---|---|---|---|---|
| 1 | St. Francis Brooklyn | 18 | 12 | .667 |
| 2 | Denver | 19 | 12 | .632 |
| | Loyola Chicago | 19 | 12 | .632 |
| | Western Michigan | 19 | 12 | .632 |
| 5 | Dartmouth | 19 | 11 | .579 |
| | Washington | 19 | 11 | .579 |
| 7 | SIUE | 18 | 10 | .556 |
| 8 | American | 22 | 12 | .545 |
| | Cal State Fullerton | 22 | 12 | .545 |
| | Wake Forest | 22 | 12 | .545 |

Last update on December 14, 2015

- All statistics are through the games of December 13, 2015

WON-LOST-TIED PERCENTAGE
| Rank | School | Wins | Loses | Ties | W-L-T % |
|---|---|---|---|---|---|
| 1 | Denver | 15 | 1 | 3 | .868 |
| 2 | Stanford | 18 | 2 | 3 | .848 |
| 3 | Georgetown | 16 | 2 | 3 | .833 |
| 4 | Creighton | 19 | 4 | 0 | .826 |
| 5 | North Carolina | 15 | 2 | 3 | .825 |
| 6 | Wake Forest | 17 | 3 | 2 | .818 |
| 7 | Akron | 18 | 3 | 3 | .813 |
| 8 | Seattle | 18 | 4 | 1 | .804 |
| 9 | Clemson | 17 | 3 | 4 | .792 |
| 10 | SMU | 15 | 3 | 4 | .773 |

Last update on December 14, 2015

== Attendances ==
| Team | Home average |
|---|---|
| UC Santa Barbara | 3,844 |
| UConn | 3,504 |
| Creighton | 3,297 |
| Maryland | 3,203 |
| Wake Forest | 2,720 |
| Louisville | 2,663 |
| Clemson | 2,648 |
| Cal Poly | 2,488 |
| South Carolina | 2,245 |
| Akron | 2,186 |
| Indiana | 1,994 |
| Saint Louis | 1,915 |
| UCLA | 1,858 |
| Virginia | 1,810 |
| New Mexico | 1,691 |
| Utah Valley | 1,590 |
| Portland | 1,548 |
| Penn St. | 1,546 |
| UMBC | 1,543 |
| Kentucky | 1,489 |
| Syracuse | 1,316 |
| North Carolina | 1,174 |
| Stanford | 1,174 |
| SIUE | 1,157 |
| Elon | 1,155 |
| Notre Dame | 1,092 |
| Virginia Tech | 1,040 |
| Grand Canyon | 1,038 |
| Boston U. | 1,032 |
| UNCG | 1,030 |
| Ohio St. | 1,027 |
| Georgetown | 958 |
| Michigan | 951 |
| Michigan St. | 942 |
| Air Force | 941 |
| Butler | 932 |
| Charlotte | 924 |
| Milwaukee | 918 |
| Binghamton | 915 |
| UNCW | 901 |
| Dartmouth | 894 |
| Furman | 876 |
| South Florida | 871 |
| Yale | 862 |
| UAB | 856 |
| Washington | 816 |
| St. John's (NY) | 811 |
| North Carolina St. | 802 |
| CSU Bakersfield | 800 |
| Cincinnati | 793 |

== See also ==
- College soccer
- List of NCAA Division I men's soccer programs
- 2015 in American soccer
- 2015 NCAA Division I Men's Soccer Championship
