= 2015 Big South Conference men's soccer tournament =

Tournament details
- Country: United States
- Teams: 8

Final positions
- Champions: Winthrop
- Runners-up: High Point

Tournament statistics
- Matches played: 7

The 2015 Big South Conference men's soccer tournament was the 32nd edition of the tournament. It determined the Big South Conference's automatic berth into the 2015 NCAA Division I Men's Soccer Championship.

The Winthrop Eagles won the tournament, besting the High Point Panthers in the championship match.

== Qualification ==
2015 Big South Conference men's soccer standings
	Conf.					Overall
Team	W		L		T	W		L		T
Winthrop ‡	7	–	1	–	1	11	–	7	–	2
Radford +	7	–	1	–	1	14	–	4	–	2
No. 20 Coastal Carolina +	6	–	1	–	3	13	–	3	–	3
Campbell	5	–	4	–	0	10	–	9	–	0
Longwood	4	–	4	–	1	9	–	9	–	1
High Point	3	–	3	–	3	8	–	6	–	7
Gardner–Webb	3	–	6	–	0	4	–	14	–	0
UNC Asheville	3	–	6	–	0	6	–	12	–	1
Liberty	2	–	6	–	1	6	–	10	–	1
Presbyterian	0	–	8	–	1	0	–	16	–	1
‡-Tournament champion +- Invited to the NCAA Division I Men's Soccer Championship; As of November 22, 2015; Rankings from NSCAA

The top eight teams in the Big South Conference based on their conference regular season records qualified for the tournament.

== Bracket ==
Quarterfinals
1	Winthrop	3
8	UNC Asheville	0
4	Campbell	3
5	Longwood	2
2	Radford	2
7	Gardner–Webb	0
3	Coastal Carolina	1 (2)
6	High Point (pen.)	1 (4)

Semifinals
1	Winthrop	4
4	Campbell	0
2	Radford	3
6	High Point	4

Championship
1	Winthrop (pen.)	0 (3)
6	High Point	0 (1)

== Schedule ==
=== Quarterfinals ===
November 10, 2015	Winthrop	3–0	UNC Asheville	Rock Hill, South Carolina
7:00 PM ET	Barnes 19'; Thorrson 49'; Hasenstab 80'	Report		Stadium: Eagle Field; Attendance: 286; Referee: Daniel Burak

November 10, 2015	Campbell	3–2	Longwood	Buies Creek, North Carolina
7:00 PM ET	Farias 23'; Page 72'; Jones 83'	Report	Bodie 18'; Miezan 41'	Stadium: Eakes Athletics Complex; Attendance: 400; Referee: Robert Sibiga

November 10, 2015	Radford	2–0	Gardner–Webb	Radford, Virginia
7:10 PM ET	Nalborski 13'; Daehlie 64'	Report		Stadium: Cupp Stadium; Attendance: 659; Referee: Danny Thornberry

November 10, 2015	Coastal Carolina	1–1 (a.e.t.) (2–4 p)	High Point	Conway, South Carolina
7:10 PM ET	Dargent 54'	Report	Ramsell 90'	Stadium: CCU Soccer Field; Attendance: 237; Referee: Carmen Serbio
	Penalties
	Camargo (penalty missed); Gudmundsson (penalty scored); Dargent (penalty scored); Einarsson (penalty missed)		(penalty scored) Uzo; (penalty scored) Kudolo; (penalty scored) Fenwick; (penalty missed) Punyed; (penalty scored) Ramsell

=== Semifinals ===
November 13, 2015	Winthrop	4–0	Campbell	Greensboro, North Carolina
4:00 PM ET	Lluch 54'; Hasenstab 60', 71', 76'	Report		Stadium: Macpherson Stadium; Attendance: 717; Referee: Christopher Spivey

November 13, 2015	Radford	3–4	High Point	Greensboro, North Carolina
7:00 PM ET	Tiedemann 65'; O'Keefe 67'; Daehlie 69'	Report	Ryan 56'; Campbell 79'; Ramsell 81'; Amofah 90' (o.g.)	Stadium: Macpherson Stadium; Attendance: 717; Referee: Neil Barbulescu

=== Championship ===
November 15, 2015	Winthrop	0–0 (a.e.t.) (3–1 p)	High Point	Greensboro, North Carolina
2:00 PM ET		Report		Stadium: Macpherson Stadium; Attendance: Not reported Referee: Brandon Marion
	Penalties
	Lluch (penalty scored); Coulson (penalty missed); Thorrson (penalty missed); Skonicki (penalty scored); Hasenstab (penalty scored)		(penalty scored) Foster; (penalty missed) Kudolo; (penalty missed) Fenwick; (penalty missed) Ryan

== Statistical leaders ==
=== Top goalscorers ===
Rank	Player	College	Goals

As of 15 November 2015

== See also ==
- Big South Conference
- 2015 Big South Conference men's soccer season
- 2015 NCAA Division I men's soccer season
- 2015 NCAA Division I Men's Soccer Championship
