= 2015 UCLA Bruins men's soccer team =

American college soccer season

2015 UCLA Bruins men's soccer
- Conference: Pac-12 Conference
- Record: 11–9–1 (5–4–1 Pac-12)
- Head coach: Jorge Salcedo (12th season)
- Assistant coaches: Nick Carlin-Voigt (4th season); Leonard Griffin (2nd season); Phil Marfuggi (1st season)
- Home stadium: Drake Stadium

2015 Pac-12 Conference men's soccer standings
	Conf.					Overall
Team	W		L		T	W		L		T
No. 7 Stanford ‡	7	–	1	–	2	17	–	2	–	2
No. 25 UCLA +	5	–	4	–	1	11	–	9	–	1
Washington	4	–	3	–	3	8	–	5	–	6
California	4	–	4	–	2	9	–	6	–	2
Oregon State	3	–	6	–	1	8	–	9	–	1
San Diego State	2	–	7	–	1	8	–	8	–	3
‡-Conference champion + - Invited to the NCAA Division I Men's Soccer Championship; As of December 5, 2015; Rankings from NSCAA

The 2015 UCLA Bruins men's soccer team represented The University of California, Los Angeles during the 2015 NCAA Division I men's soccer season. It was the 80th season of the university fielding a program.

UCLA advanced to the second round of the 2015 College Cup, where they lost to Seattle.

== Schedule ==
Date Time, TV	Rank^{#}	Opponent^{#}	Result	Record	Site City, State
Preseason
08-18-2015*; 5:00 pm		Mexico U17	T 1–1		North Athletic Field; Los Angeles, CA
08-22-2015*; 5:00 pm		San Francisco	W 2–1		North Athletic Field; Los Angeles, CA
Regular Season
08-29-2015*; 4:00 pm, P12N	No. 1	New Mexico	W 1–0	1–0–0	Drake Stadium (861); Los Angeles, CA
09-04-2015*; 4:00 pm, BTN	No. 1	at No. 6 Maryland	L 1–2 ^{OT}	1–1–0	Ludwig Field (8,449); College Park, MD
09-07-2015*; 11:00 am	No. 1	at No. 12 Georgetown	L 1–3	1–2–0	Shaw Field (2,159); Washington, DC
09-13-2015*; 5:00 pm, P12N	No. 8	UC Riverside	L 1–2 ^{OT}	1–3–0	Drake Stadium (877); Los Angeles, CA
09-18-2015*; 7:00 pm		Cal Poly	W 4–1	2–3–0	Drake Stadium (1,534); Los Angeles, CA
09-21-2015*; 7:00 pm, P12N		UC Santa Barbara; UCSB rivalry	L 2–4	2–4–0	Drake Stadium (1,337); Los Angeles, CA
09-25-2015*; 7:00 pm, P12N		VCU	W 2–1	3–4–0	Drake Stadium (2,582); Los Angeles, CA
09-27-2015*; 7:00 pm, P12N		UC Irvine	W 4–3 ^{OT}	4–4–0	Drake Stadium (1,337); Los Angeles, CA
10-02-2015; 1:30 pm, P12N		at Oregon State	L 0–1 ^{2OT}	4–5–0 (0–1–0)	Lorenz Field (535); Corvallis, OR
10-04-2015; 7:00 pm, P12N		at No. 15 Washington	W 3–2 ^{2OT}	5–5–0 (1–1–0)	Husky Soccer Stadium (975); Seattle, WA
10-12-2015; 7:00 pm, P12N		San Diego State	W 4–0	6–5–0 (2–1–0)	Drake Stadium (728); Los Angeles, CA
10-16-2015; 8:00 pm, P12N		No. 3 Stanford	L 1–2	6–6–0 (2–2–0)	Drake Stadium (2,755); Los Angeles, CA
10-19-2015; 6:00 pm, P12N		California	W 6–0	7–6–0 (3–2–0)	Drake Stadium (1,132); Los Angeles, CA
10-23-2015; 8:00 pm, P12N		at No. 3 Stanford	T 2–2 ^{2OT}	7–6–1 (3–2–1)	Cagan Stadium (1,771); Stanford, CA
10-25-2015; 3:00 pm, P12N		at California	L 3–4	7–7–1 (3–3–1)	Edwards Stadium (920); Berkeley, CA
11-01-2015*; 10:00 am	No. 25	at No. 6 Akron	W 4–2	8–7–1	FirstEnergy Stadium–Cub Cadet Field (2,169); Akron, OH
11-06-2015; 2:00 pm, P12N	No. 19	Oregon State	W 4–1	9–7–1 (4–3–1)	Drake Stadium (6,253); Los Angeles, CA
11-08-2015; 5:00 pm, P12N	No. 19	Washington	W 2–1	10–7–1 (5–3–1)	Drake Stadium (1,675); Los Angeles, CA
11-14-2015; 7:00 pm, P12N	No. 16	San Diego State	L 0–1 ^{2OT}	10–8–1 (5–4–1)	SDSU Sports Deck (712); San Diego, CA
NCAA Tournament
11-19-2015; 7:00 pm		Cal Poly; NCAA First round	W 2–0	11–8–1	Drake Stadium (766); Los Angeles, CA
11-22-2015; 6:00 pm		at (11) Seattle; NCAA Second round	L 0–1	11–9–1	Championship Field (1,800); Seattle, WA
*Non-conference game. ^{#}Rankings from United Soccer Coaches. (#) Tournament seedings in parentheses.
