= 2015 MAC men's soccer tournament =

Tournament details
- Country: United States
- Teams: 4

Final positions
- Champions: Akron
- Runners-up: Buffalo

Tournament statistics
- Matches played: 3

The 2015 Mid-American Conference men's soccer tournament was the 22nd edition of the tournament. It determined the Mid-American Conference's automatic berth into the 2015 NCAA Division I Men's Soccer Championship.

The Akron Zips won the tournament, besting the Buffalo Bulls in the championship match. It was Akron's fourth-consecutive MAC championship, and their 12th ever MAC title.

== Qualification ==
2015 Mid-American Conference men's soccer standings
	Conf.					Overall
Team	W		L		T	W		L		T
No. 5 Akron ‡	4	–	0	–	1	18	–	3	–	2
Western Michigan	3	–	1	–	1	10	–	4	–	4
Buffalo	2	–	2	–	1	8	–	7	–	4
West Virginia	2	–	3	–	0	6	–	12	–	0
Northern Illinois	1	–	3	–	1	7	–	6	–	1
Bowling Green	1	–	4	–	0	9	–	9	–	1
‡-Tournament Champion +-Invited to the NCAA Division I Men's Soccer Championship; As of December 5, 2015; Rankings from NSCAA

The top four teams in the Mid-American Conference based on their conference regular season records qualified for the tournament. Akron, Buffalo, Western Michigan and West Virginia earned berths into the tournament.

== Bracket ==
Semifinals
1	Akron	3
4	West Virginia	2
2	Western Michigan	1
3	Buffalo (OT)	2

Final
1	Akron	1
3	Buffalo	0

== Schedule ==
=== Semi-finals ===
November 13, 2015	Western Michigan	1–2 (a.e.t.)	Buffalo	Akron, Ohio
4:00 PM ET	Bock 66'	Report	Cramarossa 86'; Cicerone 97'	Stadium: FirstEnergy Stadium; Attendance: 1,238; Referee: Jorge Cuate

November 13, 2015	Akron	3–2	West Virginia	Akron, Ohio
7:00 PM ET	Najem 23'; Holthusen 49', 68'	Report	Souders 68' (o.g.); Merriam 72'	Stadium: FirstEnergy Stadium; Attendance: 1,238; Referee: Ted Grigoriou

=== MAC Championship ===
November 15, 2015	Akron	1–0	Buffalo	Akron, Ohio
1:00 PM ET	Souto 45'	Report		Stadium: FirstEnergy Stadium; Attendance: 1,335; Referee: Cesar Ibarra

== Statistical leaders ==
=== Top goalscorers ===
Rank	Player	College	Goals
1	(New Zealand) Stuart Holthusen	Akron	2
2	(United States) Zach Bock	Western Michigan	1
2	(United States) Russell Cicerone	Buffalo	1
2	(Canada) Daniel Cramarossa	Buffalo	1
2	(United States) Jamie Merraim	West Virginia	1
2	(Brazil) Victor Souto	Akron	1

As of 10 December 2015

== Tournament Best XI ==
Note: Flags indicate national team as defined under FIFA eligibility rules; some limited exceptions apply. Players may hold more than one non-FIFA nationality.

No.	Pos.	Nation	Player
—	GK	CAN	Joseph Kuta (Buffalo)
—	DF	USA	Zach Bock (Western Michigan)
—	DF	CAN	Daniel Cramarossa (Buffalo)
—	DF	JAM	Francio Henry (West Virginia)
—	DF	USA	Andrew Souders (Akron)
—	MF	USA	Jamie Merraim (West Virginia)
—	MF	USA	Sean Conerty (Western Michigan)
—	MF	USA	Russell Cicerone (Buffalo)
—	MF	USA	Adam Najem (Akron)
—	MF	BRA	Victor Souto (Akron)
—	FW	NZL	Stuart Holthusen (Akron)
