= 2015 Akron Zips men's soccer team =

American college soccer season

2015 Akron Zips men's soccer

MAC Tournament champions Georgetown Invitational champions

NCAA Tournament, College Cup, L 0–0 (7–8) vs. Stanford
- Conference: Mid-American Conference
- Record: 18-3-2 (0–0 MAC)
- Head coach: Jared Embick (3rd season)
- Assistant coaches: Leo Chappel (1st season); Oliver Slawson (9th season); Ger Coppinger (1st season)
- Home stadium: FirstEnergy Stadium–Cub Cadet Field

2015 Mid-American Conference men's soccer standings
	Conf.					Overall
Team	W		L		T	W		L		T
No. 5 Akron ‡	4	–	0	–	1	18	–	3	–	2
Western Michigan	3	–	1	–	1	10	–	4	–	4
Buffalo	2	–	2	–	1	8	–	7	–	4
West Virginia	2	–	3	–	0	6	–	12	–	0
Northern Illinois	1	–	3	–	1	7	–	6	–	1
Bowling Green	1	–	4	–	0	9	–	9	–	1
‡-Tournament Champion +-Invited to the NCAA Division I Men's Soccer Championship; As of December 5, 2015; Rankings from NSCAA

The 2015 Akron Zips men's soccer team represented The University of Akron during the 2015 NCAA Division I men's soccer season. It was the 66th season of the university fielding a program. The Zips entered the season as the three-time defending MAC Men's Soccer Tournament champions.

The Zips begin the season on August 28 at VCU, and conclude the season at home against Bowling Green.

== 2015 incoming team members ==
Name	Pos.	Height	Weight	Club	Hometown	Recruiting Ratings

== Schedule ==
Date Time, TV	Rank^{#}	Opponent^{#}	Result	Record	Site City, State
Preseason
August 18*	No. 25	Oakland	W 4–2		FirstEnergy Stadium (1,154)
August 22*	No. 25	Bradley	W 3–1		FirstEnergy Stadium (1,299)
Regular season
August 28*	No. 25	at No. RV VCU; VCU Tournament	W 3–2 ^{2OT}	1–0–0	Sports Backers Stadium (1,237)
August 30*	No. 25	vs. No. 24 Old Dominion; VCU Tournament	L 1–4	1–1–0	Sports Backers Stadium (348)
September 4*		at No. 4 Georgetown; Georgetown Tournament	W 1–0	2–1–0	Shaw Field (1,137)
September 7*		vs. No. 6 Maryland; Georgetown Tournament	W 3–2	3–1–0	Shaw Field (4,003)
September 11*	No. rv	No. 16 Saint Louis	W 3–2	4–1–0	FirstEnergy Stadium (2,734)
September 16*	No. 11	Ohio State	T 3–3 ^{2OT}	4–1–1	FirstEnergy Stadium (3,889)
September 22*	No. 9	No. 15 Wake Forest	L 1–2	4–2–1	FirstEnergy Stadium (2,516)
September 25*	No. 9	at No. RV UC Santa Barbara	W 2–0	5–2–1	Harder Stadium (7,283)
September 30*	No. 9	Penn State	W 1–0	6–2–1	FirstEnergy Stadium (2,103)
October 3*	No. 9	at UAB	W 2–1 ^{OT}	7–2–1	West Campus Field (632)
October 6*	No. 8	Santa Clara	W 2–0	8–2–1	FirstEnergy Stadium (1,813)
October 9	No. 8	at Buffalo	W 2–1	9–2–1	UB Stadium (512)
October 17	No. 6	Northern Illinois	W 4–0	10–2–1	FirstEnergy Stadium (1,719)
October 21*	No. 5	Michigan State	W 4–1	11–2–1	FirstEnergy Stadium (2,062)
October 24	No. 5	at Western Michigan	T 1–1 ^{2OT}	11–2–2	WMU Soccer Complex (971)
October 30	No. 6	at West Virginia	W 2–0	12–2–2	Dlesk Stadium (1,238)
November 1*	No. 6	No. 25 UCLA	L 2–4	12–3–2	First Energy Stadium (2,169)
November 7	No. 10	Bowling Green	W 4–0	13–3–2	First Energy Stadium (1,691)
MAC Tournament
November 13	No. 10	West Virginia; MAC Tournament Semifinal	W 3–2	14–3–2	First Energy Stadium (1,238)
November 15	No. 10	Buffalo; MAC Tournament Final	W 1–0	15–3–2	First Energy Stadium (1,335)
NCAA Tournament
November 22*	No. 5	No. 23 Rutgers; NCAA 2nd Round	W 6–1	16–3–2	First Energy Stadium (2,025)
November 29*	No. 5	No. 11 SMU; NCAA 3rd Round	W 2–1	17–3–2	First Energy Stadium (2,280)
December 5*	No. 5	No. 9 Creighton; NCAA Quarterfinal	W 3–2 ^{2OT}	18–3–2	First Energy Stadium
December 11	No. 5	vs. No. 8 Stanford; NCAA College Cup Semifinal	T 0–0 (L 7–8 pen.) ^{2OT}	18–3–3	Children's Mercy Park; Kansas City, Kansas (4,047)
*Non-conference game. ^{#}Rankings from United Soccer Coaches. (#) Tournament seedings in parentheses.

== See also ==
- Akron Zips men's soccer
- 2015 Mid-American Conference men's soccer season
- 2015 NCAA Division I men's soccer season
- 2015 MAC Men's Soccer Tournament
- 2015 NCAA Division I Men's Soccer Championship
