= 2015 Radford Highlanders men's soccer team =

American college soccer season

2015 Radford Highlanders men's soccer
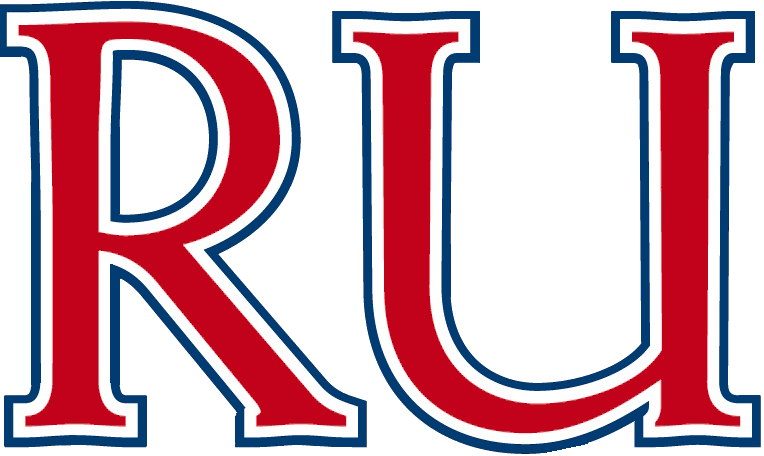

JMU Tournament Champions

NCAA Tournament First Round
- Conference: Big South Conference
- Record: 14–4–2 (7–1–1 Big South)
- Head coach: Marc Reeves (6th season)
- Assistant coaches: Brian Cronin (1st season); Riley Butler (2nd season); Scott Bennett (4th season)
- Home stadium: Patrick D. Cupp Stadium

2015 Big South Conference men's soccer standings
	Conf.					Overall
Team	W		L		T	W		L		T
Winthrop ‡	7	–	1	–	1	11	–	7	–	2
Radford +	7	–	1	–	1	14	–	4	–	2
No. 20 Coastal Carolina +	6	–	1	–	3	13	–	3	–	3
Campbell	5	–	4	–	0	10	–	9	–	0
Longwood	4	–	4	–	1	9	–	9	–	1
High Point	3	–	3	–	3	8	–	6	–	7
Gardner–Webb	3	–	6	–	0	4	–	14	–	0
UNC Asheville	3	–	6	–	0	6	–	12	–	1
Liberty	2	–	6	–	1	6	–	10	–	1
Presbyterian	0	–	8	–	1	0	–	16	–	1
‡-Tournament champion +- Invited to the NCAA Division I Men's Soccer Championship; As of November 22, 2015; Rankings from NSCAA

The 2015 Radford Highlanders men's soccer team represented Radford University during the 2015 NCAA Division I men's soccer season.

They lost to Charlotte in the first round of the NCAA tournament.

== Schedule ==
Date Time, TV	Rank^{#}	Opponent^{#}	Result	Record	Site (Attendance) City, State
Preseason
August 18*; 7:00 pm		at No. 2 Virginia	T 1–1 ^{2OT}		Klöckner Stadium; Charlottesville, VA
August 21*; 3:00 pm		Charleston (WV)	W 1–0		Cupp Stadium; Radford, VA
August 23*; 12:00 pm		Roanoke	W 7–0		Cupp Stadium; Radford, VA
Regular season
August 28*; 5:00 pm		vs. Dayton; JMU Tournament	W 2–1	1–0–0	JMU Soccer Complex (443); Harrisonburg, VA
August 30*; 12:00 pm		vs. Iona; JMU Tournament	W 1–0	2–0–0	JMU Soccer Complex (343); Harrisonburg, VA
September 5*; 6:00 pm		East Tennessee State	T 1–1 ^{2OT}	2–0–1	Cupp Stadium (417); Radford, VA
September 8*; 6:00 pm		Howard	W 3–1	3–0–1	Cupp Stadium (385); Radford, VA
September 12*; 1:00 pm		at No. 25 Georgetown	L 2–5	3–1–1	Shaw Field (519); Washington, DC
September 18*; 7:00 pm, BSS		Appalachian State	W 2–1	4–1–1	Cupp Stadium (726); Radford, VA
September 22*; 6:00 pm, BSS		Marshall	W 1–0	5–1–1	Cupp Stadium (412); Radford, VA
September 26; 2:00 pm, BSS		at Presbyterian	W 2–0	6–1–1 (1–0–0)	Martin Stadium (102); Clinton, SC
September 30; 6:00 pm		UNC Asheville	W 5–1	7–1–1 (2–0–0)	Cupp Stadium (77); Radford, VA
October 7; 6:00 pm		Longwood	W 5–1	8–1–1 (3–0–0)	Cupp Stadium (792); Radford, VA
October 10; 1:00 pm		at Campbell	W 2–0	9–1–1 (4–0–0)	Eakes Athletic Complex (123); Buies Creek, NC
October 13; 7:00 pm		at Winthrop	L 0–1	9–2–1 (4–1–0)	Eagle Field (297); Rock Hill, SC
October 17; 6:00 pm		High Point	W 2–1 ^{OT}	10–2–1 (5–1–0)	Cupp Stadium (362); Radford, VA
October 20; 6:00 pm		at Liberty	W 3–0	11–2–1 (6–1–0)	Osborne Stadium (227); Lynchburg, VA
October 23; 6:00 pm		Gardner–Webb	W 5–0	12–2–1 (7–1–0)	Cupp Stadium (622); Radford, VA
October 31; 6:00 pm		at No. 10 Coastal Carolina	T 0–0 ^{2OT}	12–2–2 (7–1–1)	CCU Soccer Complex (384); Conway, SC
November 4*; 7:00 pm		at No. 21 Elon	W 2–0	13–2–2 (8–1–1)	Rudd Field (810); Elon, NC
Big South Tournament
November 10; 7:00 pm	(2)	vs. (7) Gardner–Webb; Quarterfinals	W 2–0	14–2–2	Cupp Stadium (659); Radford, VA
November 13; 7:00 pm	(2)	vs. (6) High Point; Semifinals	L 3–4	14–3–2	Bryan Park (717); Greensboro, NC
NCAA Tournament
November 19; 7:30 pm		at Charlotte; First round	L 1–2	14–4–2	Transamerica Field (824); Charlotte, NC
*Non-conference game. ^{#}Rankings from United Soccer Coaches. (#) Tournament seedings in parentheses.
