= 2015 Stanford Cardinal men's soccer team =

American college soccer season

2015 Stanford Cardinal men's soccer

National Champions

Pac-12 Champions

NCAA Tournament, W 4–0 vs. Clemson
- Conference: Pac-12 Conference
- Record: 18–2–3 (7–1–2 Pac-12)
- Head coach: Jeremy Gunn (4th season)
- Assistant coaches: John Smith (4th season); Nick Kirchhof (4th season); Ben Graham (2nd season)
- Home stadium: Laird Q. Cagan Stadium

2015 Pac-12 Conference men's soccer standings
	Conf.					Overall
Team	W		L		T	W		L		T
No. 7 Stanford ‡	7	–	1	–	2	17	–	2	–	2
No. 25 UCLA +	5	–	4	–	1	11	–	9	–	1
Washington	4	–	3	–	3	8	–	5	–	6
California	4	–	4	–	2	9	–	6	–	2
Oregon State	3	–	6	–	1	8	–	9	–	1
San Diego State	2	–	7	–	1	8	–	8	–	3
‡-Conference champion + - Invited to the NCAA Division I Men's Soccer Championship; As of December 5, 2015; Rankings from NSCAA

The 2015 Stanford Cardinal men's soccer team represented Stanford University during the 2015 NCAA Division I men's soccer season. It was the 43rd season of the university fielding a program.

== Background and preseason ==
=== Roster changes ===
During the 2015 offseason, Stanford's junior forward, Jordan Morris was capped again by the United States men's national soccer team for an April 15, 2015 friendly against the team's regional rivals, Mexico. Morris scored in the match, becoming the first collegiate soccer player since 1985 to score in a U.S. match. The last time this had occurred was John Kerr Jr. (while playing for Duke) who scored in a 1985 CONCACAF Championship match against Guatemala on May 26, 1985.

The performance with the men's national team caused much speculation that Morris would forgo his junior year and either sign a Homegrown contract with Seattle Sounders FC, or go on trial with a European club. Despite the speculation, Morris stated that he would return to Stanford for his junior year.

No Stanford players were selected in the 2015 MLS SuperDraft.

=== 2015 team recruits ===
The Stanford Cardinal signed six recruits that joined the team as true freshmen in the 2015 season. The recruiting class was highlighted by Amir Bashti, who was a product of the San Jose Earthquakes academy team, Charlie Furrer of the prestigious FC Dallas academy team, and former LA Galaxy academy play Pierce Ashworth. Ashworth ahead of the season praised Jeremy Gunn's coaching philosophy and ability to develop players for the professional ranks. Ashworth said "There is nowhere in America that has the same magnitude of new ideas and free thinking coming out of a single place." In addition to these three, Tanner Beason, Colin Hyatt and Justin Kahl all signed National Letters of Intent.

=== Preseason ===
Stanford were ranked eighth in the preseason National Soccer Coaches Association of America (NSCAA) poll.

Ahead of the 2015 NCAA Division I men's soccer season, Stanford scheduled two exhibitions to be played. The Cardinal hosted Cal State Bakersfield on August 17, and Santa Clara on August 22.

== Roster ==
As of December 12, 2015

Note: Flags indicate national team as defined under FIFA eligibility rules; some limited exceptions apply. Players may hold more than one non-FIFA nationality.

No.	Pos.	Nation	Player
1	GK	USA	Andrew Epstein
2	FW	USA	Foster Langsdorf
3	DF	USA	Brandon Vincent
4	MF	USA	Tomas Hilliard-Arce
5	DF	USA	Slater Meehan
6	MF	USA	Trevor Hyman
7	MF	USA	Ty Thompson
8	DF	USA	Brian Nana-Sinkam
9	MF	USA	Mark Verso
10	MF	USA	Corey Baird
11	DF	USA	Amir Bashti
12	MF	USA	Drew Skundrich
13	FW	USA	Jordan Morris

No.	Pos.	Nation	Player
14	MF	USA	Justin Kahl
15	MF	USA	Eric Verso
16	MF	USA	Collin Hyatt
20	GK	USA	Charlie Furrer
21	DF	USA	Tanner Beason
23	MF	USA	Sam Werner
24	FW	USA	Adrian Alabi
26	DF	USA	Adam Mosharrafa
28	DF	USA	Colin Liberty
29	FW	USA	Bryce Marion
30	GK	BEL	Nico Corti
31	GK	USA	Pierce Ashworth

== Review ==
=== August ===
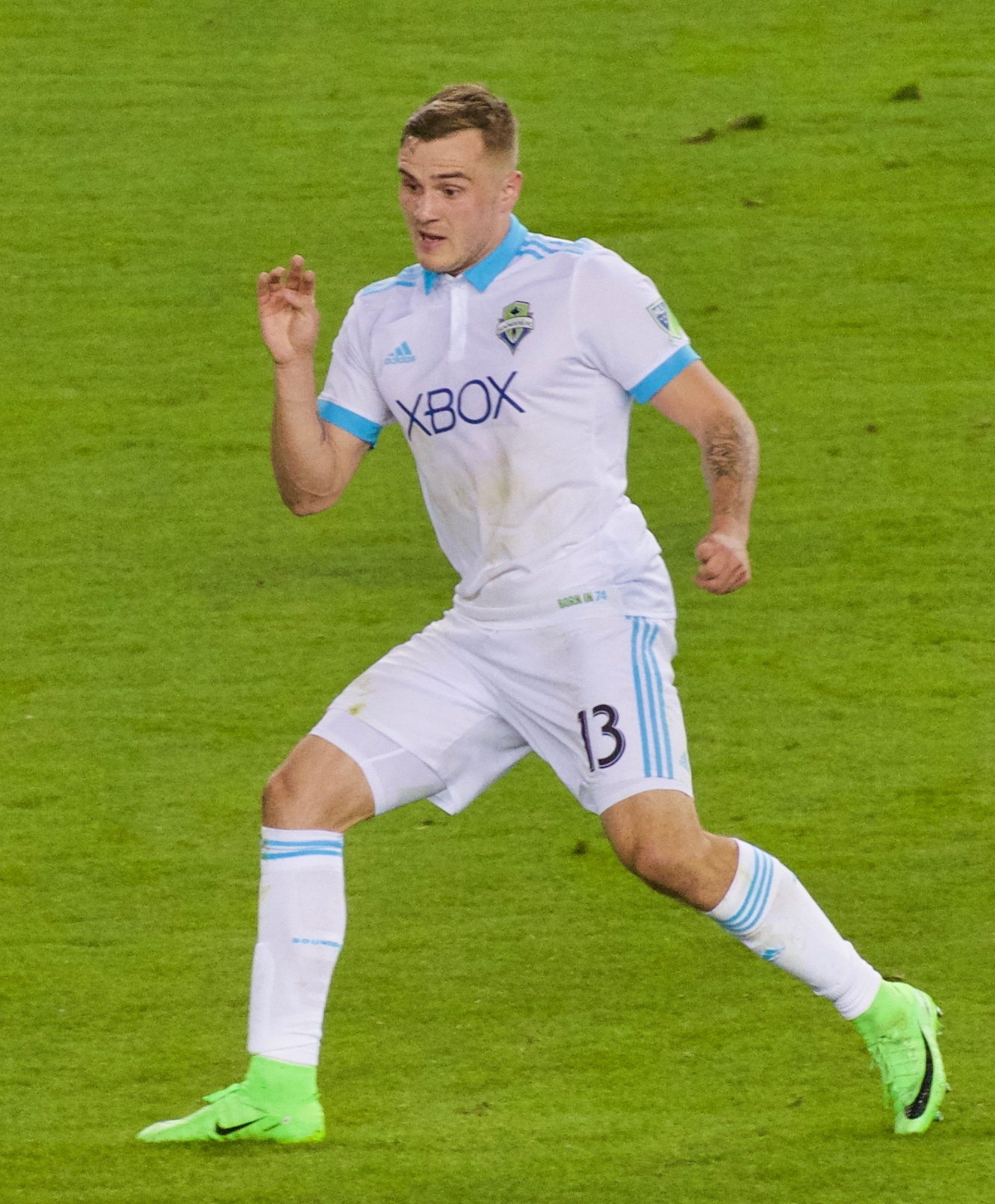
Jordan Morris, lead the Cardinal in scoring during the regular season.

The Cardinal opened the 2015 season at 17th-ranked, UC Santa Barbara on August 28. The Cardinal lost 1–0. To close out the short string of August regular season matches, Stanford traveled out to Kentucky to take on the 18th-ranked Louisville. There, the Cardinal picked up a 1–0 win thanks to a Jordan Morris goal in the 81st minute. The Cardinal finished August with a 1–1 regular season record.

=== September ===
September opened with Stanford dropping from eighth to sixteenth in the NSCAA poll, primarily due to their loss to Santa Barbara. The first two matches of September, the Cardinal hosted two East Coast teams: the Colonial Athletic Association's Northeastern Huskies, and the Atlantic 10's VCU. The weekend slate saw the Cardinal pick up two shutouts and two victories over the Wildcats and Rams, winning 1–0 and 2–0, respectively. Slater Meehan's 37th-minute goal off a corner proved to be the difference against Northeastern. Against VCU, Foster Langsdorf and Adam Mosharrafa netted their first goals of the season. Langsdorf's goal came off of a throw in from Eric Verso, while Mosharrafa's goal was the result of a loose ball in the goal box.

The weekend victories saw Stanford jump from 16th to 13th in the NSCAA rankings for week two. On September 10, the Cardinal hosted their cross-town rivals, San Jose State. Langsdorf netted his second goal of the season giving the Cardinal a 1–0 edge over the visiting Spartans. The goal came off a counterattack, where Corey Baird stole the ball from SJSU's Jonathan Colunga, and fed the through ball to Langsdorf. On the 13th of September, Stanford went on the road to Texas to take on the SMU Mustangs. Brandon Vincent found the back of the net to give the Cardinal the lead in the 10th minute against the Mustangs. Morris doubled the lead for Stanford shortly after halftime. A late second half surge of goals from SMU's Christian Boorom and Mauro Cichero tied the match, 2–2, forcing overtime. In the second period of overtime, Eric Verso netted his first goal of 2015, giving the Cardinal a 3–2 victory over the Mustangs, improving their overall record to 5–1–0.

On a five-match winning streak, the Cardinal soared from 13th to 4th in the NSCAA national rankings, and 1st in the NSCAA West regional rankings. Stanford would subsequently close out September with a pair of home matches against the West Coast Conference's San Francisco Dons, and the Atlantic 10's Davidson. Thomas Hilliard-Arce braced twice in the first half against San Francisco to score his first two goals of the season. David Garrett would pull one back for the Dons in the 47th minute, only for Morris to score an insurance goal for Stanford in the 59th minute. Shortly thereafter, the Dons' Davi Ramos was ejected from the match for a violent challenge on Langsdorf.

Stanford ousted Davidson on September 20, 1–0, thanks a Morris golden goal in the 99th minute of play. The Wildcats, who were out-shot 23–6 the whole match, were able to force a 0–0 draw in regulation. The golden goal gave Stanford their second overtime victory of the season, and propelled them to 7–1–0 to close out September, as well as non-conference play.

=== October ===
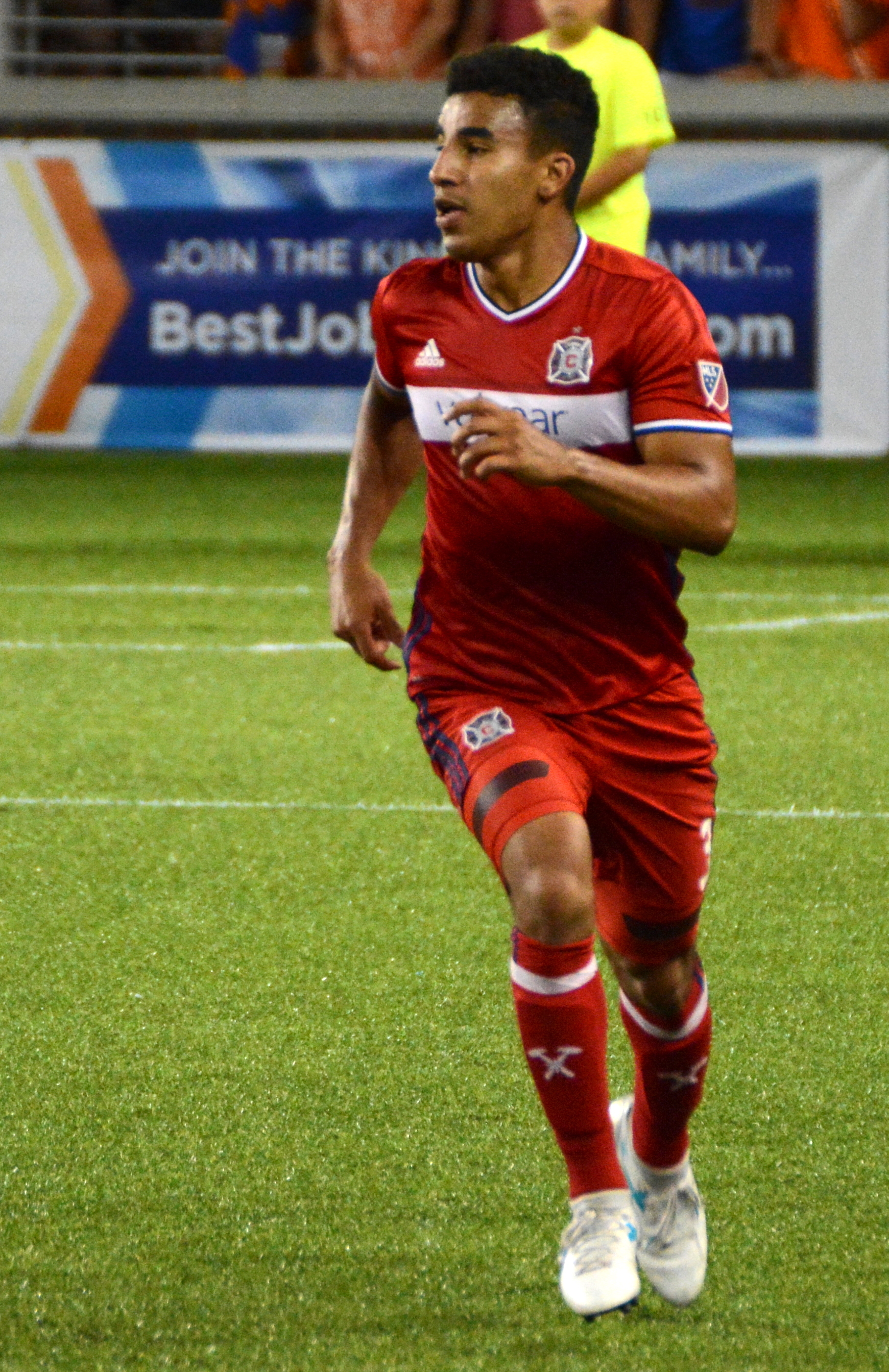
Brandon Vincent lead Stanford in scoring throughout October.

Between non-conference a Pac-12 play, the Cardinal had a two-week break between matches. Despite the break, the Cardinal jumped from 4th to 3rd in the NSCAA polls. On October 4, Stanford traveled across the bay to take on their Pac-12 rivals, the 25th-ranked California Golden Bears. In the match, Stanford jumped out to a quick two-goal lead, thanks to a 14th minute brace from Vincent, and a counter-attacking goal in the 18th minute, scored by Langsdorf. Cal's Jose Carrera-Garcia brought the match back to one in the 31st minute, but it would prove to be the final goal on the afternoon in Berkeley. The Cardinal improved to an 8–1 record overall and a 1–0 conference record.

With their third away victory over a ranked opponent, Stanford remained steady in the NSCAA polls, staying at third place. The Creighton Bluejays occupied the top spot while the North Carolina Tar Heels were second, having slightly more first-place votes over Stanford. The Cardinal's second Pac-12 match saw them host the 17th-ranked Washington Huskies. After 90 minutes of scoreless soccer, two overtime periods were played, with the match still tied. After two overtime periods, the tie stood, and Stanford's record became 8–1–1, with an undefeated 1–0–1 record in Pac-12 play. It was Stanford's first match since their August 28 fixture against UC Santa Barbara, that they were shut-out.

On October 11, the Cardinal posted their largest victory of the season over the 16th-ranked Oregon State Beavers. Amir Bashti netted his first goal of the season in the 5th minute. Ten minutes into the second half, Oregon State suffered a chain of defensive breakdowns that lead to Stanford goals in the 53rd and 57th minute by Vincent and Langsdorf, respectively. Despite the win, Stanford remained ranked third in the nation.

Stanford continued their winning ways in Pac-12 play with a two-match weekend road swing to Southern California. There, they played at the UCLA Bruins and at the San Diego State Aztecs. Their October 16 match at UCLA was a 2–1 victory. Bashti opened the scoring for Stanford shortly before halftime, only for Pac-12 Rookie of the Year, Abu Danladi to tie things up, 1–1 in the 47th minute. Morris scored the go-ahead goal for Stanford in 65th minute. Tensions flared towards the end of the match, when UCLA's Larry Ndjock was ejected for unsportsmanlike behavior. In their October 18 matchup against San Diego State, the Aztecs took a 1–0 lead over Stanford just 90 seconds into the match, thanks to Jeroen Meefout follow up. Ten minutes later, Stanford would tie the match off of a Morris strike. Shortly following the restart, Baird scored giving the Cardinal a 2–1 lead just 12 minutes into the match. In the 55th minute, Baird would tack on an extra goal for Stanford, giving the Cardinal a 3–1 victory.

The following week, still ranked third, the Cardinal played both San Diego State and UCLA again, but at home. On October 23, the Cardinal and Bruins fought to a 2–2 draw after 110 minutes of soccer. Langsdorf opened the scoring in the 21st minute, only for Danladi to tie things up in the 35th minute. Seyi Adekoya gave the Bruins the lead in the 65th minute, but Vincent nullified the lead with an equalizer in the 70th minute of play. At the end of the game, Stanford's record became 11–1–2, while remaining undefeated in Pac-12 action, with a 4–0–2 record. On October 26, the Cardinal hosted the Aztecs and again won by a 3–1 scoreline. Leading scorers Langsdorf and Morris netted for the Cardinal, as well as Hillard-Arce. Meefourt, who scored against Stanford the previous week, got the better of the Stanford defence again, although the goal was a mere consolation goal.

The Cardinal closed out October with an away Pac-12 fixture in Oregon, where they faced the Oregon State Beavers. The match remained gridlocked for nearly 80 minutes, until Meehan slotted one past Oregon State goalie, Tyler Back. Morris added an addition goal for Stanford just two minutes later, giving the Cardinal a 2–0 away win.

=== November ===
The Cardinal remained on the road and in the Pacific Northwest. On November 2, the Cardinal played in Seattle against the Washington Huskies. There, Stanford suffered their first loss since August, their second of the season, and their first in Pac-12 play, losing 2–1 to the Huskies. Sam Werner scored the lone goal for Cardinal in the 15th minute, which was Werner's first goal of the season. The Huskies would score two unanswered goals, one late in the first half thanks to Steven Wright, and again in the second half thanks to Kyle Coffee. The Cardinal dropped to 13–2–2 on the season and 6–1–2 in Pac-12 play.

The loss to Washington dropped Stanford from third to sixth in the nation. On November 12, the Cardinal concluded their season with a home match against 23rd-ranked California. Werner, once again, was the difference-maker in the match, scoring the Cardinal's lone goal in the 7th minute of play. The goal proved to be the only goal of the match, giving Stanford a 1–0 victory, as well as the Pac-12 Conference Men's Soccer Championship, and a guaranteed berth into the 2015 NCAA Division I Men's Soccer Championship.

With an RPI of eight and a NSCAA ranking of six, the Cardinal were one of the 16 seeded teams in the NCAA Tournament, being seeded eighth. By being seeded, the Cardinal were granted a first round bye in the tournament, and would end the tournament in the second round proper, or round of 32. There, the Cardinal faced preseason opponents, Santa Clara on November 22 to open up the tournament. In their opening NCAA match, the Cardinal found themselves down at halftime, thanks to a 27th-minute flick from the Broncos' Dylan Autran. Twelve minutes into the second half, Vincent scored on a free kick to tie the match, 1–1. The goal would be the start of three unanswered goals for Stanford. Twenty minutes later, Bashti would tally two goals in the 74th and 85th minutes to give Stanford a 2–1 and then 3–1 lead, which proved to be the final score of the match. The win allowed Stanford to advance to the Third Round, or round of 16 for the first time since 2002.

In their third round fixture, held on November 29, the Cardinal hosted the ninth-seed, and 14th-ranked, Ohio State Buckeyes. The Cardinal would win again by the same 3–1 scoreline, thanks to two goals from Morris, and one goal from Baird. Abdi Mohamed would tie the match briefly for Ohio State, although Morris and Baird's late second half goals absolved the goal. The win, which was the final match of November, sent Stanford to the quarterfinals of the NCAA Tournament for the first time in 13 years.

=== December ===
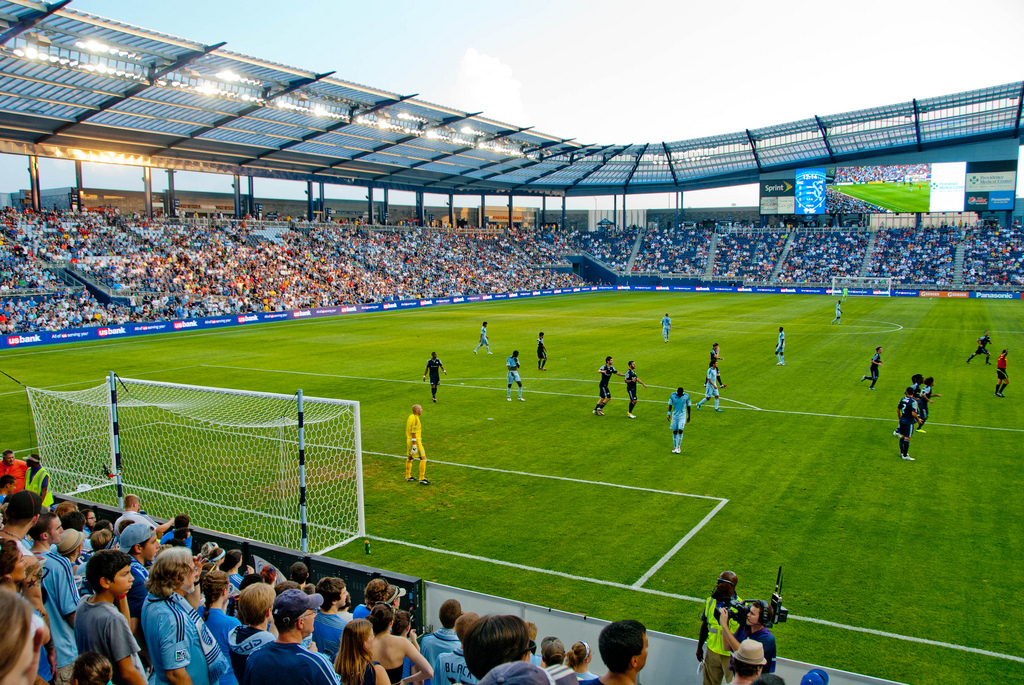
Children's Mercy Park in Kansas City, Kansas hosted the 2015 NCAA Division I Men's Soccer Championship Game.

On December 5, the Cardinal traveled across the country to take on top-seeded and top-ranked Wake Forest Demon Deacons. The Deamon Deacons boasted future-Hermann Trophy winner, Ian Harkes, ACC Rookie of the Year, Jack Harrison and ACC Defender of the Year, Jacori Hayes. The cagey quarterfinal match was played in front of a sold-out crowd of 4,906 at W. Dennie Spry Soccer Stadium. In the match, Stanford found the back of the net first, with Morris netting the opening goal in the 18th minute. Wake Forest captain, Harkes, would tie the match in the 70th minute. The match remained tied through regulation. Seven minutes into overtime, Langsdrof headed a free kick from Baird, which found the back of the net, giving the Cardinal a 2–1 win, and their first berth to the College Cup since the 2002 run.

For the College Cup, the "Final Four", of college soccer, the Cardinal traveled out to Kansas City, as the College Cup semifinal and final matches are hosted at a predetermined neutral venue. For the 2015 edition, the College Cup was hosted by the UMKC Kangaroos men's soccer program, with matches being played at Children's Mercy Park, the home stadium of Major League Soccer club, Sporting Kansas City. The semifinals were played on December 11 and the final was held on December 13.

The semifinal match of the College Cup had Stanford take on college soccer powerhouse, and 2010 NCAA Champions, Akron. The match between the Cardinal and Zips remained scoreless through 110 minutes of action. A marathon of penalty kicks ended in 10th round, when Akron's Nate Shultz missed his penalty kick, giving Stanford an 8–7 penalty shoot-out victory. The victory sent Stanford to their third ever national championship, where they would take on two-time NCAA champions, the Clemson Tigers.

The 2015 NCAA Division I Men's Soccer Championship Game was held on December 13 at 11:00 a.m., Pacific Standard Time. Two minutes into the match, the Cardinal stormed out in the lead thanks to a Morris header in the second minute. The Cardinal would remain ahead on the rainy afternoon in Kansas City, and score thrice more in the second half. Morris scored his second of the match in the 50th minute of play, while Vincent, and Eric Verso netted goals as well. The match would end 4–0, which was the largest margin of victory of 2015 for Stanford, and gave the Cardinal their first ever NCAA Division I Men's Soccer Championship.

== Schedule ==
Date Time, TV	Rank^{#}	Opponent^{#}	Result	Record	Site (Attendance) City, State
Preseason
August 17*; 7:00 pm	No. 8	CSU Bakersfield	W 2–0		Cagan Stadium (534); Stanford, CA
August 22*; 6:00 pm	No. 8	Santa Clara	T 0–0		Cagan Stadium (540); Stanford, CA
Non-conference regular season
August 28*; 7:30 pm	No. 8	at No. 17 UC Santa Barbara	L 0–1	0–1–0	Harder Stadium (3,312); Santa Barbara, CA
August 31*; 4:30 pm	No. 8	at No. 18 Louisville	W 1–0	1–1–0	Lynn Stadium (2,156); Louisville, KY
September 4*; 7:00 pm	No. 16	Northeastern	W 1–0	2–1–0	Cagan Stadium (546); Stanford, CA
September 6*; 3:00 pm, P12N	No. 16	VCU	W 2–0	3–1–0	Cagan Stadium (671); Stanford, CA
September 10*; 6:00 pm, P12N	No. 13	San Jose State; Rivalry	W 1–0	4–1–0	Cagan Stadium (1,587); Stanford, CA
September 13*; 6:00 pm	No. 13	at No. 24 SMU	W 3–2 ^{OT}	5–1–0	Westcott Field (665); Dallas, TX
September 18*; 7:00 pm	No. 4	San Francisco	W 3–1	6–1–0	Cagan Stadium (1,475); Stanford, CA
September 20*; 12:00 pm, P12N	No. 4	Davidson	W 1–0 ^{OT}	7–1–0	Cagan Stadium (705); Stanford, CA
Pac-12 regular season
October 4; 4:00 pm, P12N	No. 3	at No. 25 California; Rivalry	W 2–1	8–1–0 (1–0–0)	Edwards Stadium (1,690); Berkeley, CA
October 9; 8:00 pm, P12N	No. 3	No. 17 Washington	T 0–0 ^{2OT}	8–1–1 (1–0–1)	Cagan Stadium (1,147); Stanford, CA
October 11; 1:00 pm, P12N	No. 3	No. 16 Oregon State	W 3–0	9–1–1 (2–0–1)	Cagan Stadium (932); Stanford, CA
October 16; 1:00 pm, P12N	No. 3	at No. RV UCLA	W 2–1	10–1–1 (3–0–1)	Drake Stadium (2,775); Los Angeles, CA
October 18; 11:30 am	No. 3	at San Diego State	W 3–1	11–1–1 (4–0–1)	SDSU Sports Deck (431); San Diego, CA
October 23; 8:00 pm, P12N	No. 3	UCLA	T 2–2 ^{2OT}	11–1–2 (4–0–2)	Cagan Stadium (1,771); Stanford, CA
October 26; 8:00 pm, P12N	No. 3	San Diego State	W 3–1	12–1–2 (5–0–2)	Cagan Stadium (610); Stanford, CA
October 30; 5:00 pm	No. 4	at Oregon State	W 2–0	13–1–2 (6–0–2)	Paul Lorenz Field (452); Corvallis, OR
November 2; 7:00 pm, P12N	No. 4	at No. 25 Washington	L 1–2	13–2–2 (6–1–2)	Husky Soccer Stadium (787); Seattle, WA
November 12; 6:00 pm, P12N	No. 6	No. 23 California	W 1–0	14–2–2 (7–1–2)	Cagan Stadium (1,308); Stanford, CA
NCAA Tournament
November 22*	No. 5	Santa Clara; NCAA 2nd Round	W 3–1	15–2–2	Cagan Stadium (1,709); Stanford, CA
November 29*; 5:00 pm, P12N	No. 5	No. 14 Ohio State; NCAA 3rd Round	W 3–1	16–2–2	Cagan Stadium (1,634); Stanford, CA
December 5*; 4:00 pm, ESPN3	No. 7	at No. 1 Wake Forest; NCAA Quarterfinal	W 2–1 ^{OT}	17–2–2	Spry Stadium (4,906); Winston-Salem, NC
December 11; 7:00 pm, ESPNU	No. 7	vs. No. 5 Akron; NCAA College Cup semifinal	T 0–0 (W 8–7 pen.) ^{2OT}	17–2–3	Children's Mercy Park (4,047); Kansas City, KS
December 13*; 11:00 am, ESPNU	No. 7	vs. No. 2 Clemson; NCAA College Cup final	W 4–0	18–2–3	Children's Mercy Park (4,081); Kansas City, KS
*Non-conference game. ^{#}Rankings from United Soccer Coaches. (#) Tournament seedings in parentheses.

== See also ==
- Stanford Cardinal men's soccer
- 2015 Pac-12 Conference men's soccer season
- 2015 NCAA Division I men's soccer season
- 2015 NCAA Division I Men's Soccer Championship
