= 2015 Coastal Carolina Chanticleers men's soccer team =

American college soccer season

2015 Coastal Carolina Chanticleers men's soccer

VCU Tournament Champions
- Conference: Big South Conference
- Record: 13–3–4 (6–1–3 Big South)
- Head coach: Shaun Docking (18th season)
- Assistant coaches: Kyle Russell (6th season); Bret Mollon (3rd season)
- Home stadium: CCU Soccer Field

2015 Big South Conference men's soccer standings
	Conf.					Overall
Team	W		L		T	W		L		T
Winthrop ‡	7	–	1	–	1	11	–	7	–	2
Radford +	7	–	1	–	1	14	–	4	–	2
No. 20 Coastal Carolina +	6	–	1	–	3	13	–	3	–	3
Campbell	5	–	4	–	0	10	–	9	–	0
Longwood	4	–	4	–	1	9	–	9	–	1
High Point	3	–	3	–	3	8	–	6	–	7
Gardner–Webb	3	–	6	–	0	4	–	14	–	0
UNC Asheville	3	–	6	–	0	6	–	12	–	1
Liberty	2	–	6	–	1	6	–	10	–	1
Presbyterian	0	–	8	–	1	0	–	16	–	1
‡-Tournament champion +- Invited to the NCAA Division I Men's Soccer Championship; As of November 22, 2015; Rankings from NSCAA

Statistics and information from the 2015 CCU Men's Soccer team.

== Schedule ==
Date Time, TV	Rank^{#}	Opponent^{#}	Result	Record	Site (Attendance) City, State
Spring season
Preseason
August 15*	No. 21	at No. RV UNC Wilmington	L 1–2		Legion Stadium; Wilmington, NC
August 18*	No. 21	No. 5 North Carolina	L 0–2		CCU Soccer Field; Conway, SC
Regular season
August 28*; 7:30 pm	No. 21	at No. 24 Old Dominion; VCU Tournament	W 2–0	1–0–0	ODU Soccer Complex (781); Norfolk, VA
August 30*; 6:00 pm	No. 21	at No. RV VCU; VCU Tournament	W 2–0	2–0–0	Sports Backers Stadium (847); Richmond, VA
September 4*; 7:00 pm	No. 11	No. 18 Charlotte	W 2–0	3–0–0	CCU Soccer Field (742); Conway, SC
September 7*; 7:00 pm, ESPN3	No. 11	at No. 6 Clemson	T 1–1 ^{2OT}	3–0–1	Riggs Field (2,748); Clemson, SC
September 12*; 7:00 pm	No. 7	William & Mary	W 2–0	4–0–1	CCU Soccer Field (547); Conway, SC
September 21*; 7:00 pm	No. 5	at UAB	W 3–1	5–0–1	West Campus Field (929); Birmingham, AL
September 25; 6:00 pm	No. 5	Gardner–Webb	W 4–0	6–0–1 (1–0–0)	CCU Soccer Field (638); Conway, SC
September 30*; 7:00 pm	No. 5	No. 21 NC State	Cancelled^{[a]}		CCU Soccer Field; Conway, SC
October 7; 4:00 pm	No. 4	at Presbyterian	W 2–0	7–0–1 (2–0–0)	Martin Stadium (87); Clinton, SC
October 11; 2:00 pm	No. 4	at UNC Asheville	L 2–3	7–1–1 (2–1–0)	Greenwood Field (457); Asheville, NC
October 14; 2:00 pm	No. 11	Campbell	W 2–1	8–1–1 (3–1–0)	CCU Soccer Field (224); Conway, SC
October 16; 4:00 pm	No. 11	Liberty	W 1–0	9–1–1 (4–1–0)	CCU Soccer Field (239); Conway, SC
October 19*; 6:00 pm	No. 11	No. 22 Hofstra	W 2–1	10–1–1	CCU Soccer Field (289); Conway, SC
October 24; 2:00 pm	No. 10	at Longwood	W 2–1 ^{2OT}	11–1–1 (5–1–0)	Athletics Complex; Farmville, VA
October 28; 6:00 pm	No. 10	at Winthrop	W 3–2	12–1–1 (6–1–0)	Eagle Field; Rock Hill, SC
October 31; 6:00 pm	No. 9	No. 25 Radford	T 0–0 ^{2OT}	12–1–2 (6–1–2)	CCU Soccer Field; Conway, SC
November 4; 7:00 pm	No. 9	at High Point	T 0–0 ^{2OT}	12–1–3 (6–1–3)	Vert Stadium; High Point, NC
November 7*; 7:00 pm	No. 11	at No. 22 South Carolina	L 0–1	12–2–3	Stone Stadium; Columbia, SC
Big South Tournament
November 10; 7:00 pm	No. 20	vs. High Point; Quarterfinals	T 1–1 (L 2–4 pen.)	12–2–4	CCU Soccer Field; Conway, SC
NCAA Tournament
November 19; 7:00 pm	No. 20	North Florida; First round	W 1–0	13–2–4	CCU Soccer Field; Conway, SC
November 22; 6:00 pm, ESPN3	No. 20	at No. 5 North Carolina; Second round	L 1–2	13–3–4	Fetzer Field; Chapel Hill, NC
*Non-conference game. ^{#}Rankings from United Soccer Coaches. (#) Tournament seedings in parentheses.

^{^[a]}The match between Coastal Carolina and NC State was cancelled due to flooding and severe weather associated with the October 2015 North American storm complex.
