= Thomas Sanner =

American soccer player

Personal information
- Full name: Thomas George Sanner
- Date of birth: May 20, 1994 (age 32)
- Place of birth: Indianapolis, Indiana, United States
- Height: 1.92 m (6 ft 4 in)
- Position: Forward

College career
Years	Team	Apps	(Gls)
2012–2015	Princeton Tigers	64	(32)

Senior career*
Years	Team	Apps	(Gls)
2016–2017	Whitecaps FC 2	43	(8)
- * Club domestic league appearances and goals as of 23:31, 20 October 2017 (UTC)

Thomas George Sanner (born May 20, 1994) is an American soccer player.

== Career ==
=== Youth, college and amateur ===
Sanner played four years of college soccer at Princeton University between 2012 and 2015. In his senior year, Sanner was named Ivy League Offensive Player of the Year, NSCAA First Team All-East Region, First Team All-Ivy League and First Team All-ECAC.

=== Professional ===
On January 14, 2016, Sanner was selected in the second round (36th overall) of the 2016 MLS SuperDraft by Vancouver Whitecaps FC. He signed with the Whitecaps United Soccer League affiliate on June 17, 2016.
