= Jordan Morris =

American soccer player (born 1994)

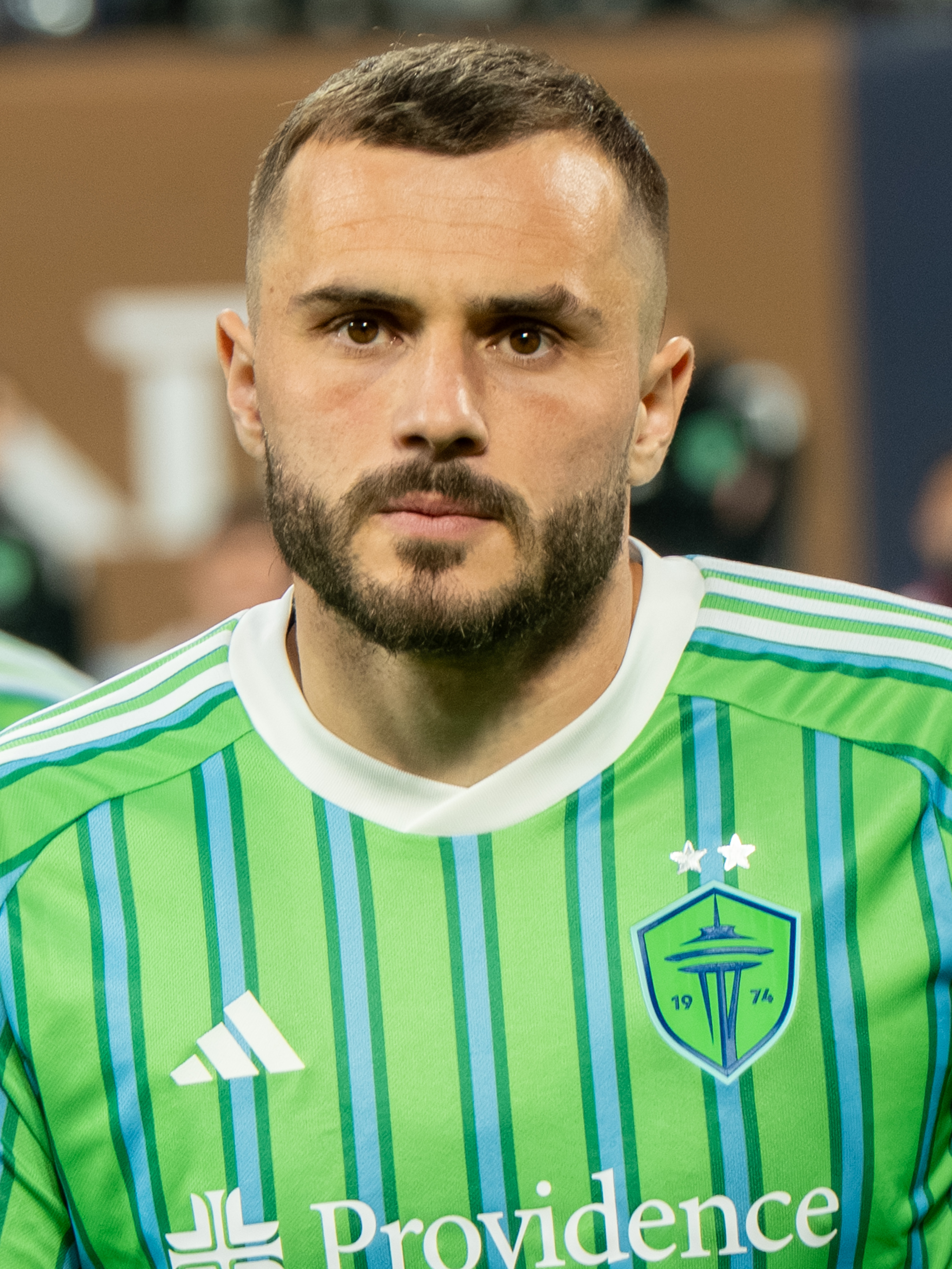
- Morris with Seattle Sounders FC in 2025

Personal information
- Full name: Jordan Perry Morris
- Date of birth: October 26, 1994 (age 32)
- Place of birth: Seattle, Washington, U.S.
- Height: 6 ft 0 in (1.83 m)
- Positions: Winger; forward

Team information
- Current team: Seattle Sounders FC
- Number: 13

Youth career
- 2004–2012: Eastside FC
- 2012–2013: Seattle Sounders FC

College career
Years	Team	Apps	(Gls)
2013–2015	Stanford Cardinal	54	(23)

Senior career*
Years	Team	Apps	(Gls)
2014	Seattle Sounders FC U23	4	(1)
2016–	Seattle Sounders FC	238	(74)
2021	→ Swansea City (loan)	4	(0)

International career^{‡}
2013	United States U20	3	(1)
2014–2016	United States U23	13	(6)
2014–2023	United States	55	(11)
Medal record
Men's soccer
Representing United States
Winner	CONCACAF Gold Cup	2017
Runner-up	CONCACAF Gold Cup	2019
- * Club domestic league appearances and goals as of November 7, 2026 ‡ National team caps and goals as of July 12, 2023

Jordan Perry Morris (born October 26, 1994) is an American professional soccer player who plays as a winger or forward for Major League Soccer club Seattle Sounders FC.

Morris grew up on Mercer Island, Washington, and joined the Sounders youth academy before playing college soccer at Stanford University. Morris won the Hermann Trophy in his senior season at Stanford and was called up to the United States national team, scoring in a friendly against Mexico. He signed for Seattle's senior team in 2016 as a Homegrown Player, winning an MLS Cup in his rookie season and a second title in 2019. Morris was loaned to EFL Championship side Swansea City in early 2021, but returned after four matches due to an ACL tear.

In 2025, Morris passed up former teammate Raúl Ruidíaz for the most goals in Seattle Sounders FC history with a total of 87 goals.

== Youth and amateur career ==
Morris, from Mercer Island, Washington, began his youth career with Eastside FC, where he played from 2004 to 2012, from U11 to U17, with the Eastside FC B94 Red team, coached by Dan Strom, and helped the team to six of its seven Washington State titles as well as two third-place finishes at the US Youth Soccer National Championships in 2011 and 2012: he was named to the Best XI in 2011, and was the Golden Ball winner in 2012. Morris was also named NSCAA Washington State Player of the Year and NSCAA High School All-American in 2012.

He joined the Sounders FC youth academy and played in the U.S. Soccer Development Academy for one season.

=== Stanford University ===
On February 6, 2012, Morris signed a letter of intent to play college soccer at Stanford University.

In his freshman year with the Cardinal, Morris appeared in all 21 matches and led all Pac-12 freshman with seven assists and 19 points and tied for the lead with six goals and helped lead his team to their first NCAA Tournament since 2009 where they would eventually fall 1–0 to #2 seed Washington in the Round of 16. He went on to be named first team All-Pac-12 that year. Morris also spent time with Seattle Sounders FC U-23 in the Premier Development League. In his sophomore year, Morris helped lead Stanford to its first Pac-12 championship since 2001.

In his junior year, Morris scored 13 goals and had 3 assists. He led the Cardinal to both the Pac-12 and the NCAA Championship. In the NCAA tournament, Morris scored 5 of Stanford's total of 12 goals. In the championship game against Clemson, Morris scored his first of two goals in the game only 87 seconds into the contest. On January 8, 2016, Morris was awarded the Hermann Trophy as the best player in NCAA Division I soccer.

== Club career ==
In January 2016, Morris trained with German club Werder Bremen at their winter camp, which Bremen chief executive Thomas Eichin described as "an opportunity for us to get to know the player better." Later in January, Bremen extended Morris' trial who then played in a friendly match against Inter Baku PIK and recorded an assist. Bremen offered a contract to Morris and Eichin expressed confidence that they would sign him, but Morris turned down the German club's offer in favor of returning to play in the United States.

=== Seattle Sounders FC ===
After winning the NCAA Division I Men's Soccer Championship, there was speculation that Morris would begin to play professionally. Coach Jürgen Klinsmann stated that Morris "obviously has to" turn pro. His decision to stay at Stanford University for a third year was criticized, as was his decision to play professionally in the United States instead of Europe.

==== 2016: Debut season ====
On January 5, 2016, Morris announced he decided to forgo his senior season at Stanford to join a professional team. It was widely speculated that Morris would sign with Seattle Sounders FC, the club for which his father works, and also holds his amateur rights. On January 21, Morris signed with Seattle Sounders FC, being given MLS's highest-ever Homegrown Player contract worth roughly $250,000 a year. He joined the Sounders' preseason training camp in Arizona, debuting on February 9 in a friendly against Celaya F.C. On February 23, Morris made his professional debut against Club América in the CONCACAF Champions League, starting the match. The following week, he debuted in the Sounders' first Major League Soccer (MLS) match of the season against Sporting Kansas City.

Morris scored his first MLS goal for the Sounders on April 16, 2016, against the Philadelphia Union. He then went on to score in his next three consecutive games, matching the Seattle rookie scoring record, his next goal then surpassed the record that had been set by Steve Zakuani in 2009. The Sounders won their first MLS Cup after a run from ninth place into fourth made possible by Morris's goalscoring and contributions from Nicolas Lodeiro, a new midseason acquisition made by Seattle. Morris was named MLS Rookie of the Year with his 12 regular season goals, the second-highest for a league rookie behind Cyle Larin in 2015. He had also scored in the Western Conference Final second leg against the Colorado Rapids while sick with an undisclosed virus and injured.

==== 2018: ACL injury and contract extension ====
On February 22, 2018, while playing in El Salvador against Santa Tecla in the Sounders' first match of the 2018 CONCACAF Champions League, Morris collapsed from a non-contact injury in the 85th minute and was later diagnosed with a torn anterior cruciate ligament (ACL). He was reported to likely miss 6–9 months and began rehabilitation after knee surgery. After missing the entirety of the 2018 MLS season, Morris was signed to a five-year contract extension with the Sounders in December 2018.

==== 2019: Comeback Player of the Year ====
Morris returned for the 2019 season and scored 10 goals during the regular season and a hat-trick in the playoffs to help the Sounders win a second MLS Cup title. He was named MLS Comeback Player of the Year for his recovery.

==== 2020: MLS is Back ====
Morris continued playing during the COVID-19 pandemic and the MLS is Back Tournament despite an elevated risk due to his diabetes, citing his confidence in the club's precautionary measures.

==== Loan to Swansea City ====
On January 22, 2021, Swansea City announced that they had signed Morris on a loan for the remainder of the 2020–21 EFL Championship season. He made his debut on January 30 as a substitute against Rotherham United. During a match against Huddersfield Town on February 20, Morris suffered an ACL injury to his left knee and was stretchered off in the 66th minute. The injury forced him to miss the rest of the Swansea City season as well as national team fixtures. As a result, his loan stint was prematurely terminated and Morris returned to the United States for treatment.

==== Return to the Sounders ====
Morris underwent a successful knee surgery in March 2021 that was performed by Dr. Bert Mandelbaum, who had previously operated on him following his right ACL tear in 2018. He underwent rehabilitation with the Sounders for eight months and enrolled in Stanford University's online classes to finish his degree in science technology and society. Morris returned to on-field training in August and appeared in the 2021 Leagues Cup roster as an unused substitute. He made his return on November 1, 2021, as a substitute against the LA Galaxy in Seattle's penultimate regular season match. He made an additional regular season appearance as a substitute and started for the Sounders in a playoffs loss to Real Salt Lake.

Morris scored three goals for the Sounders during their run to the 2022 CONCACAF Champions League title and was named to the Team of Tournament. He scored his 50th overall goal for Seattle in a 2–1 loss to CF Montréal on June 29, 2022. Morris was named to the 2022 MLS All-Star Game roster and played in the first half against the Liga MX All-Stars before being substituted.

In the fifth week of the 2023 regular season, Morris earned his second career hat-trick with the Sounders, scoring four goals in a 4–1 away win against Sporting Kansas City. He was the first Sounders player to score four goals in an MLS match. Several of his goals in the opening weeks of the season were scored from headers, which he had focused on during training with assistant coach Preki.

== International career ==
In May 2013, Morris was one of 22 players named to the U.S. under-20 squad for the Toulon Tournament where he made three appearances. He also made appearances for the U.S. under-23 national team on August 6, 2014, and scored in a 5–1 win over Barbados.

On August 28, 2014, Morris received his first senior call up to the U.S. men's national team for a friendly against the Czech Republic, making him the first college player to be called into squad since Chris Albright was called up in 1999 while he was still playing at the University of Virginia. Although he was left on the bench for that match, he made his international debut in November in a 4–1 defeat to Ireland.

On April 15, 2015, he scored his first U.S. men's national team goal against Mexico in an international friendly. In the 2017 CONCACAF Gold Cup Final, Morris scored the winning goal for the United States, assuring a victory over Jamaica and becoming joint top scorer of the tournament with three goals.

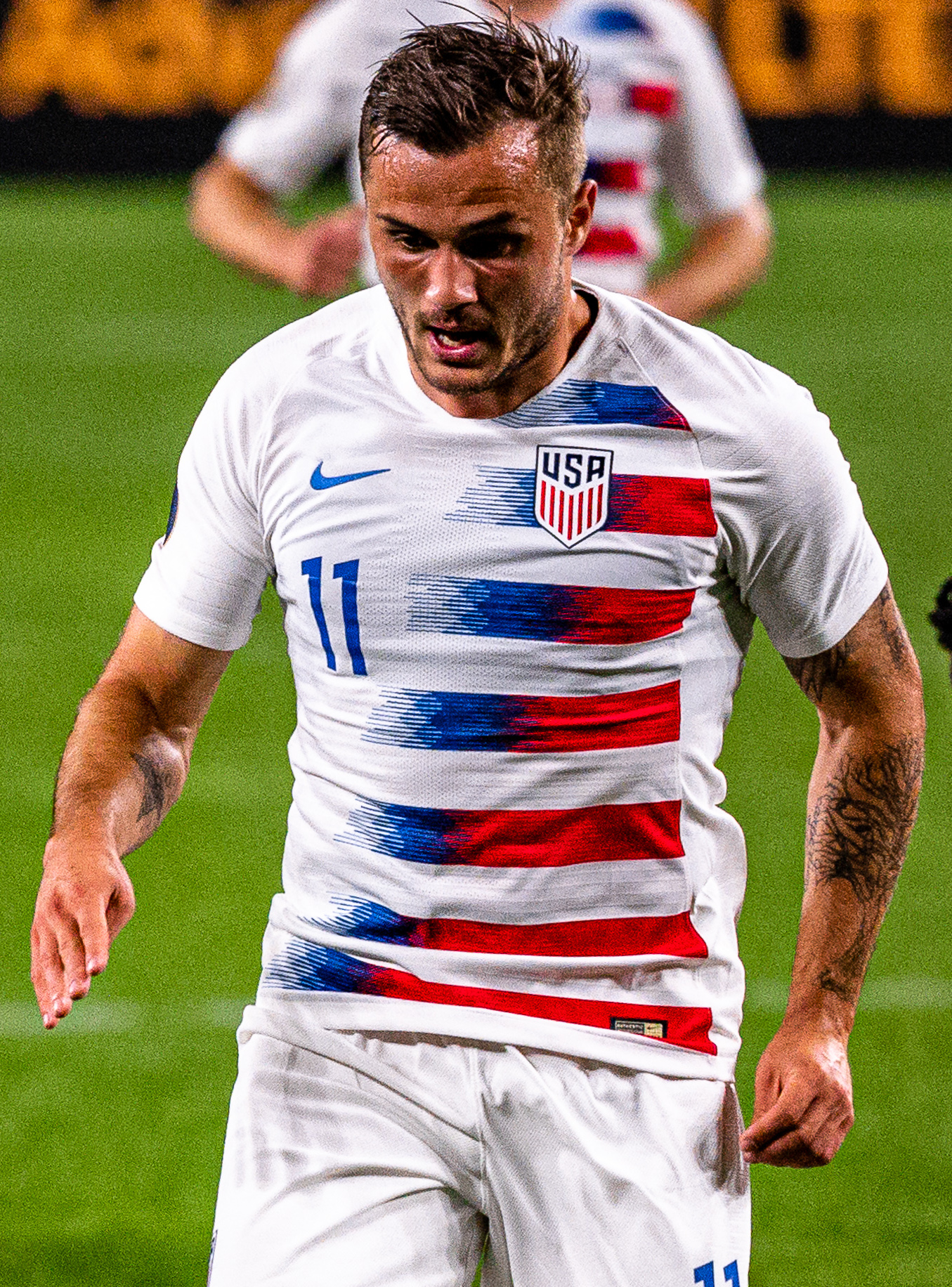
Morris with the United States at the 2019 CONCACAF Gold Cup

On January 21, 2022, Morris received his first World Cup qualifying call up since September 2017 after a lengthy injury recovery. He was named to the U.S. squad for the 2022 FIFA World Cup alongside teammate Cristian Roldan, a close friend and roommates on away trips for both teams. Morris made an appearance as a substitute in the first group stage match against Wales on November 21, 2022.

== Personal life ==
Morris was born in Seattle, Washington, to Michael and Leslie Morris. His father, Dr. Michael Morris, was the chief medical director of Seattle Sounders FC from 2009 to 2024. He has three siblings named Christopher, Julian and Talia. Morris attended Mercer Island High School, where he played high school soccer prior to joining the Sounders Academy. Morris married his wife Eliza in 2020; they live with several dogs. He sold his home in Kirkland, Washington, in 2026.

Morris was diagnosed with Type 1 diabetes at the age of nine and is one of the few professional athletes with the condition to play. He said that having diabetes has helped shape him. His tattoo "T1D" on his inner arm is a tribute to the armband people with diabetes have to wear.

== Career statistics ==
=== Club ===
As of match played November 7, 2026

Appearances and goals by club, season and competition
Club	Season	League			Playoffs		National cup (Note: Includes U.S. Open Cup, FA Cup)		Continental		Other		Total	
Club	Season	Division	Apps	Goals	Apps	Goals	Apps	Goals	Apps	Goals	Apps	Goals	Apps	Goals
Seattle Sounders FC	2016	MLS	34	12	6	2	2	0	2 (Note: Appearance(s) in CONCACAF Champions League/Cup)	0	—		44	14
Seattle Sounders FC	2017	MLS	23	3	2	0	0	0	—		—		25	3
Seattle Sounders FC	2018	MLS	0	0	0	0	0	0	1	0	—		1	0
Seattle Sounders FC	2019	MLS	26	10	4	3	0	0	—		—		30	13
Seattle Sounders FC	2020	MLS	22 (Note: Includes three appearances and one goal in MLS is Back Tournament group stage)	10	4	1	—		2	1	1 (Note: Appearance in MLS is Back Tournament knockout stage)	0	29	12
Seattle Sounders FC	2021	MLS	2	0	1	0	—		—		—		3	0
Seattle Sounders FC	2022	MLS	29	7	—		0	0	8	3	—		37	10
Seattle Sounders FC	2023	MLS	26	11	4	2	0	0	—		3 (Note: One appearance in FIFA Club World Cup, two appearances and one goal in Leagues Cup)	1	33	14
Seattle Sounders FC	2024	MLS	34	13	3	1	2	1	—		5 (Note: Appearances in Leagues Cup)	3	44	18
Seattle Sounders FC	2025	MLS	17	5	3	2	—		4	0	1 (Note: Appearance in FIFA Club World Cup)	0	25	7
Seattle Sounders FC	2026	MLS	25	3	0	0	—		2	0	0	0	27	3
Seattle Sounders FC	Total		238	74	27	11	4	1	20	4	9	4	298	94
Swansea City (loan)	2020–21	Championship	4	0	—		1	0	—		—		5	0
Career total			242	74	27	11	5	1	20	4	9	4	303	94

=== International ===
As of match played July 12, 2023

Appearances and goals by national team and year
National team	Year	Apps	Goals
United States	2014	1	0
United States	2015	6	1
United States	2016	5	0
United States	2017	12	4
United States	2018	1	0
United States	2019	14	5
United States	2020	0	0
United States	2021	1	0
United States	2022	11	1
United States	2023	4	0
Total		55	11

As of match played June 14, 2022.
Scores and results list United States's goal tally first, score column indicates score after each Morris goal.

List of international goals scored by Jordan Morris
No.	Date	Venue	Opponent	Score	Result	Competition
1	April 15, 2015	Alamodome, San Antonio, United States	Mexico	1–0	2–0	Friendly
2	February 3, 2017	Finley Stadium, Chattanooga, United States	Jamaica	1–0	1–0	Friendly
3	July 12, 2017	Raymond James Stadium, Tampa, United States	Martinique	2–0	3–2	2017 CONCACAF Gold Cup
4	July 12, 2017	Raymond James Stadium, Tampa, United States	Martinique	3–2	3–2	2017 CONCACAF Gold Cup
5	July 26, 2017	Levi's Stadium, Santa Clara, United States	Jamaica	2–1	2–1	2017 CONCACAF Gold Cup
6	September 10, 2019	Busch Stadium, St. Louis, United States	Uruguay	1–1	1–1	Friendly
7	October 11, 2019	Audi Field, Washington, D.C., United States	Cuba	3–0	7–0	2019–20 CONCACAF Nations League A
8	November 15, 2019	Exploria Stadium, Orlando, United States	Canada	1–0	4–1	2019–20 CONCACAF Nations League A
9	November 19, 2019	Truman Bodden Sports Complex, George Town, Cayman Islands	Cuba	2–0	4–0	2019–20 CONCACAF Nations League A
10	November 19, 2019	Truman Bodden Sports Complex, George Town, Cayman Islands	Cuba	3–0	4–0	2019–20 CONCACAF Nations League A
11	June 14, 2022	Estadio Cuscatlán, San Salvador, El Salvador	El Salvador	1–1	1–1	2022–23 CONCACAF Nations League A

== Honors ==
Stanford Cardinal

- NCAA Division I Men's Soccer Championship: 2015
- Pac-12 Conference: 2015

Seattle Sounders FC

- MLS Cup: 2016, 2019
- CONCACAF Champions League: 2022

United States

- CONCACAF Gold Cup: 2017

Individual

- NSCAA High School All-American: 2012
- First team All-Pac-12: 2013, 2014, 2015
- Pac-12 Player of the Year: 2015
- Hermann Trophy: 2015
- MLS Rookie of the Year: 2016
- CONCACAF Gold Cup Best XI: 2017
- MLS Comeback Player of the Year: 2019
- MLS Best XI: 2020
- CONCACAF Champions League Best XI: 2022
- MLS All-Star: 2022, 2023
