= Eric Verso =

American soccer player

Personal information
- Date of birth: October 4, 1992 (age 34)
- Place of birth: Glendale, California, United States
- Height: 1.78 m (5 ft 10 in)
- Position: Attacking midfielder

Youth career
- 2008–2011: LA Galaxy

College career
Years	Team	Apps	(Gls)
2012–2015	Stanford Cardinal	72	(13)

Senior career*
Years	Team	Apps	(Gls)
2016	Rio Grande Valley FC Toros	4	(0)
- * Club domestic league appearances and goals as of September 26, 2016

Eric Verso (born October 4, 1992) is an American soccer player.

== Career ==
=== College ===
Verso spent his entire college career at Stanford University. He made a total of 72 appearances for the Cardinal and tallied 12 goals and 19 assists. His 13 assists in his senior year helped Stanford to the 2015 NCAA National Championship.

=== Professional ===
On January 14, 2016, Verso was selected in the second round (34th overall) of the 2016 MLS SuperDraft by Montreal Impact. However, he wasn't signed by the club. On June 11, 2016, Verso signed with United Soccer League side Rio Grande Valley FC Toros. He made his professional debut the following day as a 71st-minute substitute in a 3–0 win over Oklahoma City Energy.
