= 2015 Clemson Tigers men's soccer team =

American college soccer season

2015 Clemson Tigers men's soccer

ACC Tournament, Semifinalists

NCAA Tournament, National Runners-Up
- Conference: Atlantic Coast Conference
- Record: 17–3–4 (6–1–1 ACC)
- Head coach: Mike Noonan (6th season)
- Assistant coaches: Phillip Jones (3rd season); Liam Curran (2nd season)
- Home stadium: Riggs Field

2015 ACC men's soccer standings
	Conf.					Overall
Team	W		L		T	W		L		T
Atlantic
No. 1 Wake Forest +	6	–	0	–	2	17	–	3	–	2
No. 3 Clemson +	6	–	1	–	1	16	–	2	–	3
Boston College +	4	–	4	–	0	11	–	8	–	2
No. 6 Syracuse ‡	3	–	4	–	1	16	–	5	–	3
Louisville	1	–	4	–	3	7	–	9	–	3
NC State	1	–	4	–	3	8	–	6	–	3
Coastal
No. 4 North Carolina +	6	–	1	–	1	15	–	2	–	3
No. 8 Notre Dame +	4	–	2	–	2	11	–	5	–	6
No. 18 Virginia +	4	–	2	–	2	10	–	5	–	3
Duke	3	–	4	–	1	10	–	7	–	2
Virginia Tech	0	–	5	–	3	5	–	9	–	3
Pittsburgh	0	–	7	–	1	5	–	9	–	3
‡ - ACC Tournament champion + - Invited to the NCAA Division I Men's Soccer Championship; As of December 5, 2015; Rankings from NSCAA

The 2015 Clemson Tigers men's soccer team represented Clemson University during the 2015 NCAA Division I men's soccer season. The Tigers were led by head coach Mike Noonan, in his sixth season. They played home games at Riggs Field. Riggs Field celebrated its 100-year anniversary this year, in October. This was the team's 55th season playing organized men's college soccer and their 28th playing in the Atlantic Coast Conference.

== Roster ==
Updated 11/13/15

Note: Flags indicate national team as defined under FIFA eligibility rules; some limited exceptions apply. Players may hold more than one non-FIFA nationality.

No.	Pos.	Nation	Player
1	GK	(United States) USA	Michael Zierhoffer
2	DF	(United States) USA	Kyle Fisher
3	DF	(Denmark) DEN	Patrick Bunk-Andersen
4	MF	(England) ENG	Oliver Shannon
5	DF	(Bermuda) BER	Mauriq Hill
6	MF	(England) ENG	Paul Clowes
7	MF	(Norway) NOR	Iman Mafi
8	FW	(Italy) ITA	Michele Bottari
9	FW	(Costa Rica) CRC	Diego Campos
10	FW	(United States) USA	T. J. Casner
11	DF	(England) ENG	Aaron Jones
12	MF	(Costa Rica) CRC	Saul Chinchilla
13	MF	(United States) USA	Michael Melvin
14	MF	(United States) USA	Grayson Raynor
15	MF	(France) FRA	Alex Happi

No.	Pos.	Nation	Player
16	MF	(United States) USA	John Cajka
17	MF	(Brazil) BRA	Thales Moreno
18	DF	(United States) USA	Tyler Rider
19	FW	(United States) USA	Kyle Murphy
20	FW	(United States) USA	Austen Burnikel
21	DF	(United States) USA	Michael Serrano
22	GK	(United States) USA	Andrew Tarbell
23	MF	(United States) USA	Jonny Heckman
24	GK	(United States) USA	Brady Allardice
25	DF	(United States) USA	Chris Heijjer
26	DF	(United States) USA	Trey Langolis
27	MF	(United States) USA	Philip Tran
29	DF	(United States) USA	Andrew Burnikel
30	GK	(United States) USA	Nolan Lennon

Clemson had 7 players who received all ACC Honors in the 2015 season. Paul Clowes was named ACC Midfielder of the Year and to the all ACC first team. Kyle Fisher was named ACC Defender of the Year and to the all ACC first team. Andrew Tarbell and TJ Casner were named to the all ACC first team. Oliver Shannon and Iman Mafi were named to the all ACC third team. Patrick Bunk-Andersen was named to the all ACC freshman team. Paul Clowes and Kyle Murphy were also named to the ACC All-Tournament team. Paul Clowes and Andrew Tarbell were named Scholar All-Americans by the NSCAA. Kyle Fisher was named to the TopDrawerSoccer Postseason Best XI First team, while Paul Clowes and Andrew Tarbell were named to the second team. Patrick Bunk-Anderson was named to the Freshman Best XI Team.

== Draft picks ==
The Tigers had four players drafted in the 2016 MLS SuperDraft.

Player	Team	Round	Pick #	Position
(United States) Andrew Tarbell	San Jose Earthquakes	1st	8th	GK
(United States) Kyle Fisher	Montreal Impact	1st	14th	DF
(England) Paul Clowes	D.C. United	2nd	33rd	MF
(United States) T. J. Casner	Houston Dynamo	3rd	47th	FW

== Schedule ==
Date Time, TV	Rank^{#}	Opponent^{#}	Result	Record	Site City, State
Exhibition
August 15*	No. 11	Presbyterian	W 2–0		Soccer Practice Fields; Clemson, SC
August 20*	No. 11	Campbell	W 2–0		Soccer Practice Fields; Clemson, SC
August 22*	No. 11	at UAB	W 5–1		West Campus Field; Birmingham, AL
Regular season
August 28*	No. 11	East Tennessee State	W 3–1	1–0–0	Riggs Field (2,424); Clemson, SC
August 30*	No. 11	Mercer	W 4–1	2–0–0	Riggs Field; Clemson, SC
September 4*	No. 6	South Carolina	W 3–0	3–0–0	Riggs Field (7,868); Clemson, SC
September 7*	No. 6	No. 11 Coastal Carolina	T 1–1 ^{2OT}	3–0–1	Riggs Field (2,748); Clemson, SC
September 12	No. 5	at No. 2 Notre Dame	L 0–1	3–1–1 (0–1–0)	Alumni Stadium (1,379); Notre Dame, IN
September 15*	No. 5	at Furman	W 3–0	4–1–1	Stone Soccer Stadium (2,948); Greenville, SC
September 18	No. 7	No. 16 Duke	W 2–1	5–1–1 (1–1–0)	Riggs Field (3,111); Clemson, SC
September 20*	No. 7	No. 21 Brown	W 3–1	6–1–1	Riggs Field (1,559); Clemson, SC
September 26	No. 5	at No. 8 Wake Forest	T 1–1 ^{2OT}	6–1–2 (1–1–1)	Spry Stadium (2,346); Winston-Salem, NC
September 29*	No. 5	at Gardner–Webb	W 4–0	7–1–2	Greene–Harbison Stadium (1,261); Boiling Springs, NC
October 2	No. 5	Virginia Tech	W 2–0	8–1–2 (2–1–1)	Riggs Field (2,296); Clemson, SC
October 6*	No. 5	at Charlotte	W 1–0	9–1–2	Transamerica Field (1,495); Charlotte, NC
October 9	No. 5	Louisville	W 4–2	10–1–2 (3–1–1)	Riggs Field (3,286); Clemson, SC
October 17	No. 4	at No. 16 Syracuse	W 1–0	11–1–2 (4–1–1)	SU Soccer Stadium (1,582); Syracuse, NY
October 20*	No. 4	Georgia Southern	W 3–1	12–1–2	Riggs Field (1,463); Clemson, SC
October 23	No. 3	No. 25 Boston College; Senior Night	W 1–0	13–1–2 (5–1–1)	Riggs Field (3,538); Clemson, SC
October 30	No. 3	at NC State	W 4–1	14–1–2 (6–1–1)	WakeMed Soccer Park (1,289); Raleigh, NC
ACC Tournament
November 08	No. 3	Boston College; Quarterfinal	W 3–0	15–1–2	Riggs Field (1,355); Clemson, SC
November 11	No. 3	No. 16 Syracuse; Semifinal	L 0–2	15–2–2	Riggs Field (3,056); Clemson, SC
NCAA Tournament
November 22*	No. 2	Elon; First Round	W 5–2	16–2–2	Riggs Field (1,941); Clemson, SC
November 29*	No. 2	No. 15 UC Santa Barbara; Second Round	W 3–2	17–2–2	Riggs Field (1,015); Clemson, SC
December 4*	No. 2	No. 10 Maryland; Elite Eight	T 1–1 (3–1) ^{2OT}	17–2–3	Riggs Field (3,411); Clemson, SC
December 11*	No. 2	vs. No. 6 Syracuse; Final Four	T 0–0 (4–1) ^{2OT}	17–2–4	Children's Mercy Park (4,047); Kansas City, KS
December 13*	No. 2	vs. No. 8 Stanford; Championship Game	L 0–4	17–3–4	Children's Mercy Park (4,081); Kansas City, KS
*Non-conference game. ^{#}Rankings from United Soccer Coaches. (#) Tournament seedings in parentheses.

After finishing 2nd in the ACC Atlantic Division for the regular season, the Tigers received a first round bye in the ACC Tournament. They defeated Boston College in the Quarterfinals, but lost to Syracuse in the Semifinals. With this strong performance, the Tigers were seeded #2 overall in the NCAA tournament. The Tigers beat Elon in the first round of the tournament. With that win the Tigers advanced to the second round where they met UC Santa Barbara. The Tigers recorded a 3–2 victory. In the Quarterfinals of the NCAA Tournament, Clemson hosted 10th seeded Maryland. Clemson advanced 3–-1 in the penalty shootout, after the game was tied 1–-1. Clemson won its final four match over Syracuse in penalties after the match was tied 0–-0 after double overtime. Clemson advanced to the championship match vs. Stanford. The Tigers lost the Championship match 4–-0, finishing runners up in the NCAA tournament.
