= 2015 Syracuse Orange men's soccer team =

American college soccer season

2015 Syracuse Orange men's soccer

ACC Tournament Champions Central New York Classic Champions

NCAA Tournament, College Cup L vs. Clemson
- Conference: Atlantic Coast Conference
- Record: 16–5–4 (3–4–1 ACC)
- Head coach: Ian McIntyre (3rd season)
- Assistant coaches: Jukka Masalin (3rd season); Matt Verni (2nd season); Andrew Coughlin (1st season); Fergus Barrie (1st season)
- Home stadium: SU Soccer Stadium

2015 ACC men's soccer standings
	Conf.					Overall
Team	W		L		T	W		L		T
Atlantic
No. 1 Wake Forest +	6	–	0	–	2	17	–	3	–	2
No. 3 Clemson +	6	–	1	–	1	16	–	2	–	3
Boston College +	4	–	4	–	0	11	–	8	–	2
No. 6 Syracuse ‡	3	–	4	–	1	16	–	5	–	3
Louisville	1	–	4	–	3	7	–	9	–	3
NC State	1	–	4	–	3	8	–	6	–	3
Coastal
No. 4 North Carolina +	6	–	1	–	1	15	–	2	–	3
No. 8 Notre Dame +	4	–	2	–	2	11	–	5	–	6
No. 18 Virginia +	4	–	2	–	2	10	–	5	–	3
Duke	3	–	4	–	1	10	–	7	–	2
Virginia Tech	0	–	5	–	3	5	–	9	–	3
Pittsburgh	0	–	7	–	1	5	–	9	–	3
‡ - ACC Tournament champion + - Invited to the NCAA Division I Men's Soccer Championship; As of December 5, 2015; Rankings from NSCAA

The 2015 Syracuse Orange men's soccer team represented Syracuse University during the 2015 NCAA Division I men's soccer season. It was the program's 92nd season. The Orange reached the College Cup for the first time in program history, where they lost on penalties to eventual national runner-up Clemson, Clemson.

== Roster ==
=== Squad ===
This was the Syracuse roster for the 2015 season.

Note: Flags indicate national team as defined under FIFA eligibility rules; some limited exceptions apply. Players may hold more than one non-FIFA nationality.

No.	Pos.	Nation	Player
0	GK	USA	Austin Aviza
1	GK	USA	Pat Castle
2	DF	NOR	Oyvind Alseth
3	DF	SWE	Oscar Sewerin
4	MF	USA	Liam Callahan
5	DF	ENG	Lewis Cross
6	MF	FIN	Juuso Pasanen
7	FW	ENG	Ben Polk
8	MF	SWE	Jonathan Hagman
10	MF	GER	Julian Buescher
11	FW	BIH	Adnan Bakalović
12	FW	USA	Noah Rhynhart
13	DF	HON	Gabriel Menescal
14	FW	USA	Danny Apajee

No.	Pos.	Nation	Player
15	MF	USA	Korab Syla
16	MF	NOR	Andreas Jenssen
17	FW	CAN	Chris Nanco
18	MF	USA	Morgan Hackworth
19	DF	USA	Miles Robinson
20	DF	CAN	Kamal Miller
21	MF	USA	Chris Gomez
22	FW	USA	Kenny Lassiter
24	FW	USA	Jake Keller
25	GK	GER	Hendrik Hilpert
26	MF	USA	Trevor Alexander
28	DF	USA	Brandon Albert
29	DF	USA	Spencer Kopko

=== Coaching staff ===
Position	Staff
Athletic Director	(United States) Mark Coyle
Head coach	(England) Ian McIntyre
Associate head coach	(Finland) Jukka Masalin
Asst. coach	(United States) Matt Verni
Volunteer Asst. coach	(United States) Andrew Coughlin
Graduate Asst. coach	(Scotland) Fergus Barrie

Last updated: December 17, 2015
Source: Syracuse Soccer

== Schedule ==
Date Time, TV	Rank^{#}	Opponent^{#}	Result	Record	Site (Attendance) City, State
Exhibitions
August 15*; 4:00 pm	No. 15	No. 3 Georgetown	L 0–3		SU Soccer Stadium (Not reported); Syracuse, NY
August 19*; 7:00 pm	No. 15	Buffalo	W 1–0		SU Soccer Stadium (Not reported); Syracuse, NY
August 22*; 7:00 pm	No. 15	at Connecticut	W 2–1		Morrone Stadium (1,200); Storrs, CT
Regular season
August 28*; 7:00 pm		at Hofstra	L 1–2	0–1–0	Hofstra Soccer Stadium (1,073); Hempstead, NY
August 30*; 7:05 pm		at Bucknell	W 1–0 ^{OT}	1–1–0	Emmitt Field (705); Lewisburg, PA
September 4*; 2:00 pm		UC Riverside; Central New York Classic	W 4–1	2–1–0	SU Soccer Stadium (1,759); Syracuse, NY
September 6*; 7:00 pm		Rutgers; Central New York Classic	W 2–1	3–1–0	SU Soccer Stadium (2,193); Syracuse, NY
September 11; 7:00 pm		No. 23 Louisville	T 1–1 ^{2OT}	3–1–1 (0–0–1)	SU Soccer Stadium (2,237); Syracuse, NY
September 19; 7:00 pm, ESPN3		at No. 7 Wake Forest	L 1–3	3–2–1 (0–1–1)	Spry Stadium (3,454); Winston-Salem, NC
September 22*; 7:00 pm, ESPN3		Binghamton	W 3–1	4–2–1	SU Soccer Stadium (811); Syracuse, NY
September 25; 7:00 pm		Pittsburgh	W 5–0	5–2–1 (1–1–1)	SU Soccer Stadium (2,011); Syracuse, NY
September 29*; 7:00 pm, TWC SportsChannel		at Colgate	W 2–0	6–2–1	Beyer-Small ‘76 Stadium (263); Hamilton, NY
October 2; 7:00 pm, ESPN3		at Duke	W 3–1	7–2–1 (2–1–1)	Koskinen Stadium (120); Durham, NC
October 6*; 7:00 pm, ESPN3	No. 22	Albany	W 2–1	8–2–1	SU Soccer Stadium (627); Syracuse, NY
October 10; 7:00 pm, ESPN3	No. 22	at No. 2 North Carolina	L 1–2	8–3–1 (2–2–1)	Fetzer Field (728); Chapel Hill, NC
October 13*; 7:00 pm, ESPN3	No. 16	Bowling Green	W 3–0	9–3–1	SU Soccer Stadium (363); Syracuse, NY
October 17; 7:00 pm	No. 16	No. 4 Clemson	L 0–1	9–4–1 (2–3–1)	SU Soccer Stadium (1,582); Syracuse, NY
October 20*; 7:00 pm, TWC SportsChannel	No. 16	Hartford	T 2–2 ^{2OT}	9–4–2	SU Soccer Stadium (387); Syracuse, NY
October 23; 7:00 pm	No. 15	NC State	W 2–1	10–4–2 (3–3–1)	SU Soccer Stadium (1,573); Syracuse, NY
October 30; 7:00 pm	No. 12	Boston College	L 1–2	10–5–2 (3–4–1)	Newton Campus Field (871); Chestnut Hill, MA
ACC Tournament
November 4; 7:00 pm	(7) No. 15	(10) NC State; Play-in round	W 2–0	11–5–2	SU Soccer Stadium (710); Syracuse, NY
November 8; 1:00 pm, ESPN3	(7) No. 15	at (2) No. 5 North Carolina; Quarterfinals	T 1–1 (4–3 PKs) ^{2OT}	11–5–3	Fetzer Field (1,407); Chapel Hill, NC
November 11; 7:00 pm, ESPN3	(7) No. 13	at (3) No. 2 Clemson; Semifinals	W 2–0	12–5–3	Riggs Field (3,056); Clemson, SC
November 15; 1:00 pm, ESPN3	(7) No. 13	at (3) No. 9 Notre Dame; Finals	W 1–0	13–5–3	Alumni Stadium; Notre Dame, IN
NCAA Tournament
November 22; 2:00 pm	(6) No. 6	Dartmouth; Second round	W 2–1	14–5–3	SU Soccer Stadium (1,120); Syracuse, NY
November 29; 1:00 pm	(6) No. 6	(11) No. 13 Seattle; Third round	W 3–1	15–5–3	SU Soccer Stadium (1,134); Syracuse, NY
December 5; 2:00 pm	(6) No. 6	Boston College; Quarterfinals	W 1–0	16–5–3	SU Soccer Stadium (1,923); Syracuse, NY
December 11; 6:00 pm, ESPNU	(6) No. 6	vs. (2) No. 3 Clemson; Semifinals	T 0–0 (1–4 PKs) ^{2OT}	16–5–4	Sporting Park (4,047); Kansas City, KS
*Non-conference game. ^{#}Rankings from United Soccer Coaches. (#) Tournament seedings in parentheses.
