= 2015 ACC men's soccer tournament =

Soccer tournament

Tournament details
- Country: United States
- Teams: 10

Final positions
- Champions: Syracuse
- Runners-up: Notre Dame

Tournament statistics
- Matches played: 9
- Goals scored: 18 (2 per match)

2015 ACC men's soccer standings
	Conf.					Overall
Team	W		L		T	W		L		T
Atlantic
No. 1 Wake Forest +	6	–	0	–	2	17	–	3	–	2
No. 3 Clemson +	6	–	1	–	1	16	–	2	–	3
Boston College +	4	–	4	–	0	11	–	8	–	2
No. 6 Syracuse ‡	3	–	4	–	1	16	–	5	–	3
Louisville	1	–	4	–	3	7	–	9	–	3
NC State	1	–	4	–	3	8	–	6	–	3
Coastal
No. 4 North Carolina +	6	–	1	–	1	15	–	2	–	3
No. 8 Notre Dame +	4	–	2	–	2	11	–	5	–	6
No. 18 Virginia +	4	–	2	–	2	10	–	5	–	3
Duke	3	–	4	–	1	10	–	7	–	2
Virginia Tech	0	–	5	–	3	5	–	9	–	3
Pittsburgh	0	–	7	–	1	5	–	9	–	3
‡ - ACC Tournament champion + - Invited to the NCAA Division I Men's Soccer Championship; As of December 5, 2015; Rankings from NSCAA

The 2015 Atlantic Coast Conference men's soccer tournament is the 29th edition of the ACC Men's Soccer Tournament. The tournament decides the Atlantic Coast Conference champion and guaranteed representative into the 2015 NCAA Division I Men's Soccer Championship.

== Qualification ==
The top ten teams in the Atlantic Coast Conference earned a berth into the ACC Tournament. All rounds are held at the higher seed's home field.

== Bracket ==
Preliminary Round
8	Duke	1
9	Louisville	2
7	Syracuse	2
10	NC State	0

Quarterfinals
1	Wake Forest (OT)	2
9	Louisville	1
4	Notre Dame	1
5	Virginia	0
3	Clemson	3
6	Boston College	0
2	North Carolina	1 (3)
7	Syracuse (pen.)	1 (4)

Semifinals
1	Wake Forest	0
4	Notre Dame	1
3	Clemson	0
7	Syracuse	2

Championship
4	Notre Dame	0
7	Syracuse	1

== Schedule ==
=== Play-in round ===
November 4, 2015	Louisville	2–1	Duke	Durham, North Carolina
7:00 p.m. EST	Kubel 16'; Schmitt 17'	Report	Mathers 56'	Stadium: Koskinen Stadium; Attendance: 402; Referee: Jon Brady

November 4, 2015	Syracuse	2–0	NC State	Syracuse, New York
7:00 p.m. EST	Buescher 11'; Nanco 69'	Report		Stadium: SU Soccer Stadium; Attendance: 710; Referee: Tad Levac

=== Quarter-finals ===
November 8, 2015	Wake Forest	2–1 (a.e.t.)	Louisville	Winston-Salem, North Carolina
1:00 p.m. EST	Harrison 12'; Hayes 94'	Report	Kunkel 71'	Stadium: Spry Stadium; Attendance: 2,189; Referee: Fotis Bazakos

November 8, 2015	Notre Dame	1–0	Virginia	Notre Dame, Indiana
1:00 p.m. EST	Aubrey 87'	Report		Stadium: Alumni Stadium; Attendance: 494; Referee: Carmen Serbio

November 8, 2015	Clemson	3–0	Boston College	Clemson, South Carolina
1:00 p.m. EST	Austin Burnikel 37'; Own Goal 56'; Kyle Murphy 67'	Report		Stadium: Riggs Field; Attendance: 1,355; Referee: Chris Penso

November 8, 2015	Syracuse	1–1 (a.e.t.) (4–3 p)	North Carolina	Chapel Hill, North Carolina
1:00 p.m. EST	Own Goal 27'	Report	Hume 59'	Stadium: Fetzer Field; Attendance: 1,407; Referee: Mohammad Samadpour
	Penalties
	Büscher (penalty missed); Alseth (penalty scored); Sewerin (penalty scored); Nanco (penalty scored); Rhynhart (penalty missed); Callahan (penalty scored)		George (penalty scored); October (penalty scored); Olofson (penalty missed); Campbell (penalty missed); Hume (penalty scored); Marshall (penalty missed)

=== Semi-finals ===
November 11, 2015	Wake Forest	0–1	Notre Dame	Winston-Salem, North Carolina
1:00 p.m. EST			Ueland 60'	Stadium: Spry Stadium

November 11, 2015	Clemson	0–2	Syracuse	Clemson, South Carolina
1:00 p.m. EST		Report	Polk 21'; Polk 57'	Stadium: Riggs Field; Attendance: 3,056; Referee: John McCloskey

=== Finals ===
November 15, 2015	Notre Dame	0–1	Syracuse	Notre Dame, Indiana
1:00 p.m. EST		Report	Polk 46'	Stadium: Alumni Stadium

== All-Tournament team ==
- Paul Clowes, Clemson
- Kyle Murphy, Clemson
- Chris Hubbard, Notre Dame
- Connor Klekota, Notre Dame
- Brandon Aubrey, Notre Dame
- Hendrik Hilpert, Syracuse
- Julian Buescher, Syracuse
- Miles Robinson, Syracuse
- Ben Polk, Syracuse
- Jacori Hayes, Wake Forest
- Ian Harkes, Wake Forest

== See also ==
- Atlantic Coast Conference
- 2015 Atlantic Coast Conference men's soccer season
- 2015 NCAA Division I men's soccer season
- 2015 NCAA Division I Men's Soccer Championship
