= 2016 MLS SuperDraft =

College draft for soccer teams

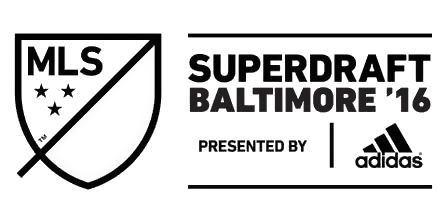

General information
- Sport: Soccer
- Date: January 14, 2016
- Time: 1:00 p.m. ET
- Location: Baltimore, Maryland
- Network: MLSSoccer.com

Overview
- 75 total selections
- First selection: Jack Harrison

The 2016 MLS SuperDraft was the seventeenth SuperDraft conducted by Major League Soccer. The SuperDraft is held each year in conjunction with the annual National Soccer Coaches Association of America convention. The 2016 convention was held in Baltimore, Maryland. The first two rounds of the 2016 SuperDraft were held on January 14, 2016. Rounds three and four were held via conference call on January 19, 2016.

== Format ==
The SuperDraft format has remained constant throughout its history and closely resembles that of the NFL draft:

1. Any expansion teams receive the first picks.
2. Non-playoff clubs receive the next picks in reverse order of prior season finish.
3. Teams that made the MLS Cup Playoffs are then ordered by which round of the playoffs they are eliminated.
4. The winners of the MLS Cup are given the last selection, and the losers the penultimate selection.

== Player selection ==
*	Denotes player who has been selected for an MLS Best XI team

=== Round 1 ===
Any player marked with a * is part of the Generation Adidas program.

Pick #	MLS team	Player	Position	College	Other
1	Chicago Fire	(England) Jack Harrison*	Midfielder	Wake Forest	
2	Philadelphia Union (Note: #2: Colorado Rapids → Philadelphia Union. January 14, 2016: Philadelphia Union acquired a first-round selection in the 2016 SuperDraft from Colorado Rapids in exchange for general allocation money and midfielder Zach Pfeffer.)	(Ghana) Joshua Yaro*	Defender	Georgetown	Baltimore Bohemians
3	Philadelphia Union	(United States) Keegan Rosenberry	Defender	Georgetown	Reading United AC
4	Chicago Fire (Note: #4: New York City FC → Chicago Fire. January 14, 2016: Chicago Fire acquired a first-round selection in the 2016 SuperDraft and general allocation money from New York City FC in exchange for midfielder Jack Harrison. Harrison had been selected by Chicago as the #1 pick in the 2016 SuperDraft minutes earlier.)	(United States) Brandon Vincent	Defender	Stanford	Portland Timbers U23s
5	Real Salt Lake	(Jamaica) Omar Holness*	Midfielder	North Carolina	Portland Timbers U23s
6	Philadelphia Union (Note: #6: Houston Dynamo → Philadelphia Union. December 7, 2015: Philadelphia Union acquired a first-round selection in the 2016 SuperDraft, general allocation money, and targeted allocation money from Houston Dynamo in exchange for midfielder Cristian Maidana and forward Andrew Wenger.)	(Germany) Fabian Herbers*	Midfielder	Creighton	
7	Orlando City SC	(Canada) Richie Laryea*	Midfielder	Akron	
8	San Jose Earthquakes	(United States) Andrew Tarbell*	Goalkeeper	Clemson	New Orleans Jesters
9	Toronto FC	(Japan) Tsubasa Endoh	Forward	Maryland	
10	New England Revolution	(United States) Jordan McCrary	Defender	North Carolina	Carolina Dynamo
11	D.C. United (Note: #11: Sporting Kansas City → D.C. United. January 14, 2016: D.C. United acquired a first-round selection in the 2016 SuperDraft from Sporting Kansas City in exchange for targeted allocation money.)	(Germany) Julian Büscher*	Midfielder	Syracuse	K-W United FC
12	Chicago Fire (Note: #12: LA Galaxy → Colorado Rapids → Chicago Fire. January 14, 2016: Chicago Fire acquired this first-round selection in the 2016 SuperDraft, a second-round selection (#22) in the 2016 SuperDraft, and the #2 ranking in the MLS Allocation Order from Colorado Rapids in exchange for a first-round selection (#15) in the 2016 SuperDraft, a second-round selection (#33) in the 2016 SuperDraft, and the #1 ranking in the MLS Allocation Order. Earlier the same day, Colorado had acquired this first-round selection from LA Galaxy in exchange for targeted allocation money.)	(United States) Jonathan Campbell	Defender	North Carolina	Seattle Sounders U-23
13	Orlando City SC (Note: #13: D.C. United → Orlando City. January 14, 2016: Orlando City SC acquired a first-round selection in the 2016 SuperDraft from D.C. United in exchange for a second-round selection (#32) in the 2016 SuperDraft and targeted allocation money.)	(Guinea) Hadji Barry	Forward	UCF	Orlando City U-23
14	Montreal Impact	(United States) Kyle Fisher	Defender	Clemson	Portland Timbers U23s
15	Colorado Rapids (Note: #15: Seattle Sounders FC → Chicago Fire → Colorado Rapids. January 14, 2016: Colorado Rapids acquired this first-round selection in the 2016 SuperDraft, a second-round selection (#33) in the 2016 SuperDraft, and the #1 ranking in the MLS Allocation Order from Chicago Fire in exchange for a first-round selection (#12) in the 2016 SuperDraft, a second-round selection (#22) in the 2016 SuperDraft, and the #2 ranking in the MLS Allocation Order. Earlier the same day, Chicago had acquired this first-round selection and general allocation money from Seattle Sounders FC in exchange for defender Joevin Jones.)	(Ghana) Emmanuel Appiah	Midfielder	Cincinnati	GPS Portland Phoenix
16	Vancouver Whitecaps FC	(United States) Cole Seiler	Defender	Georgetown	Baltimore Bohemians
17	FC Dallas	(United States) Ryan Herman	Goalkeeper	Washington	Seattle Sounders U-23
18	New York Red Bulls	(United States) Justin Bilyeu	Defender	SIU Edwardsville	FC Tucson
19	Columbus Crew SC	(Guatemala) Rodrigo Saravia	Midfielder	Florida Gulf Coast	
20	Portland Timbers	(United States) Ben Polk	Forward	Syracuse	K-W United FC

=== Round 2 ===
Pick #	MLS team	Player	Position	College	Other
21	Columbus Crew SC (Note: #21: Chicago Fire → Orlando City → Columbus Crew. August 6, 2015: Columbus Crew acquired a second-round selection in the 2016 SuperDraft from Orlando City SC in exchange for forward Adam Bedell. On December 10, 2014, Orlando City had acquired this second-round selection in the 2016 SuperDraft from Chicago Fire in exchange for defender Eric Gehrig.)	(United States) Chase Minter	Midfielder	Cal Poly	Ventura County Fusion
22	Chicago Fire (Note: #22: Colorado Rapids → Chicago Fire. January 14, 2016: Chicago Fire acquired this second-round selection in the 2016 SuperDraft, a first-round selection (#12) in the 2016 SuperDraft, and the #2 ranking in the MLS Allocation Order from Colorado Rapids in exchange for a first-round selection (#15) in the 2016 SuperDraft, a second-round selection (#33) in the 2016 SuperDraft, and the #1 ranking in the MLS Allocation Order.)	(United States) Alex Morrell	Forward	North Florida	
23	Philadelphia Union	(United States) Taylor Washington	Defender	George Mason	D.C. United U-23
24	Montreal Impact (Note: #24: New York City FC → Montreal Impact. June 12, 2014: Montreal Impact acquired a second-round selection in the 2016 SuperDraft from New York City FC in exchange for defender Jeb Brovsky.)	(Belize) Michael Salazar	Forward	UC Riverside	OC Blues U-23
25	Real Salt Lake	(United States) Max Lachowecki	Defender	Notre Dame	
26	Houston Dynamo	(Brazil) Ivan Magalhães	Defender	Maryland	
27	Seattle Sounders FC (Note: #27: Orlando City → Philadelphia Union → Toronto FC → Seattle Sounders FC. January 26, 2015: Seattle Sounders FC acquired a second-round selection in the 2016 SuperDraft from Toronto FC in exchange for defender Eriq Zavaleta. The pick acquired by Seattle was Toronto's highest second-round selection. On August 7, 2015, Toronto acquired a second-round selection in the 2016 SuperDraft from Philadelphia Union in exchange for defender Warren Creavalle. On December 8, 2014, Philadelphia had acquired this second-round selection in the 2016 SuperDraft and allocation money from Orlando City SC in exchange for defender Amobi Okugo.)	(Mexico) Tony Alfaro	Defender	Cal State Dominguez Hills	Ventura County Fusion
28	San Jose Earthquakes	(United States) Patrick Hodan	Midfielder	Notre Dame	
29	Vancouver Whitecaps FC (Note: #29: Toronto FC → Vancouver Whitecaps FC. December 18, 2015: Vancouver Whitecaps FC acquired a second-round selection in the 2016 SuperDraft from Toronto FC in exchange for defender Steven Beitashour. The pick acquired by Vancouver was Toronto's second highest second-round selection.)	(Germany) Christopher Hellmann	Forward	Lynn	Des Moines Menace
30	New England Revolution	(United States) Michael Gamble	Forward	Wake Forest	Baltimore Bohemians
31	Columbus Crew SC (Note: #31: Sporting Kansas City → Columbus Crew. December 16, 2013: Columbus Crew acquired a second-round selection in the 2016 SuperDraft from Sporting Kansas City in exchange for goalkeeper Andy Gruenebaum.)	(United States) Kyle Parker	Forward	Charlotte	
32	D.C. United (Note: #32: LA Galaxy → Orlando City → D.C. United. January 14, 2016: D.C. United acquired a second-round selection in the 2016 SuperDraft and targeted allocation money from Orlando City SC in exchange for a first-round selection (#13) in the 2016 SuperDraft. On July 30, 2015, Orlando City had acquired this second-round selection in the 2016 SuperDraft from LA Galaxy in exchange for goalkeeper Donovan Ricketts.)	(England) Paul Clowes	Midfielder	Clemson	Orlando City U-23
33	FC Dallas (Note: #33: D.C. United → Chicago Fire → Colorado Rapids → FC Dallas. January 14, 2016: FC Dallas acquired this second-round selection in the 2016 SuperDraft from Colorado Rapids in exchange for second-round (#37) and third-round (#58) selections in the 2016 SuperDraft. Earlier the same day, Colorado had acquired this second-round selection in the 2016 SuperDraft, a first-round selection (#12) in the 2016 SuperDraft, and the #1 ranking in the MLS Allocation Order from Chicago Fire in exchange for a first-round selection (#12) in the 2016 SuperDraft, a second-round selection (#22) in the 2016 SuperDraft, and the #2 ranking in the MLS Allocation Order. On January 6, 2016, Chicago had acquired this second-round selection in the 2016 SuperDraft from D.C. United in exchange for midfielder Patrick Nyarko.)	(Germany) Timo Pitter	Midfielder	Creighton	
34	Montreal Impact	(United States) Eric Verso	Midfielder	Stanford	
35	Seattle Sounders FC	(United States) Zach Mathers	Midfielder	Duke	OC Blues U-23
36	Vancouver Whitecaps FC	(United States) Thomas Sanner	Forward	Princeton	Reading United AC
37	Colorado Rapids (Note: #37: FC Dallas → Colorado Rapids. January 14, 2016: Colorado Rapids acquired this second-round selection and a third-round (#58) selection in the 2016 SuperDraft from FC Dallas in exchange for a second-round (#33) selection in the 2016 SuperDraft.)	(Costa Rica) Dennis Castillo	Defender	VCU	Portland Timbers U23s
38	New York Red Bulls	(United States) Zach Carroll	Defender	Michigan State	Michigan Bucks
39	Montreal Impact (Note: #39: Columbus Crew → Montreal Impact. August 4, 2015: Montreal Impact acquired a second-round selection in the 2016 SuperDraft from Columbus Crew in exchange for forward Jack McInerney.)	(United States) Keegan Smith	Forward	San Diego	Temecula FC
40	Portland Timbers	(Jamaica) Neco Brett	Forward	Robert Morris	Reading United AC
41	Columbus Crew SC (Note: #41: Chivas USA → Columbus Crew. May 8, 2014: Columbus Crew acquired a conditional second-round selection in the 2016 SuperDraft from Chivas USA in exchange for forward Ryan Finley. Upon the contraction of the Chivas USA franchise in October 2014, MLS announced that Columbus would receive a bonus pick, inserted as #11 in the second-round of the 2016 SuperDraft, to fulfill this trade. However, MLS later changed this pick to #21 in the second-round. No press release or additional information was provided by MLS regarding this change.)	(United States) Marshall Hollingsworth	Midfielder	Wheaton	

=== Round 3 ===
Pick #	MLS team	Player	Position	College	Other
42	LA Galaxy (Note: #42: Chicago Fire → LA Galaxy. March 3, 2014: LA Galaxy acquired this third-round selection, originally a conditional pick, in the 2016 SuperDraft from Chicago Fire in exchange for defender Greg Cochrane.)	(United States) Josh Turnley	Defender	Georgetown	D.C. United U-23
43	Colorado Rapids	(United States) Chris Froschauer	Goalkeeper	Ohio State	Dayton Dutch Lions
44	Philadelphia Union	(United States) Mitchell Lurie	Defender	Rutgers	Ocean City Nor'easters
45	FC Dallas (Note: #45: New York City FC → FC Dallas. July 29, 2014: FC Dallas acquired a third-round selection in the 2016 SuperDraft from New York City FC in exchange for midfielder Andrew Jacobson. The traded pick is New York City's highest third-round selection in 2016.)	(United States) Colin Bonner	Forward	UNCW	D.C. United U-23
46	Real Salt Lake	(Ghana) Amass Amankona	Midfielder	Dayton	Charlotte Eagles
47	Houston Dynamo	(United States) T. J. Casner	Forward	Clemson	
48	Orlando City SC	(United States) Antonio Matarazzo	Midfielder	Columbia	New York Red Bulls U-23
49	San Jose Earthquakes	(New Zealand) Kip Colvey	Defender	Cal Poly	Ventura County Fusion
50	Vancouver Whitecaps FC (Note: #50: Toronto FC → Vancouver Whitecaps FC. February 28, 2013: Vancouver Whitecaps FC acquired this third-round selection in the 2016 SuperDraft from Toronto FC in exchange for the MLS rights to forward Robert Earnshaw.)	(United States) James Moberg	Midfielder	Washington	Portland Timbers U23s
51	New England Revolution	(Benin) Femi Hollinger-Janzen	Forward	Indiana	
52	Sporting Kansas City	(Canada) Ryan James	Midfielder	Bowling Green	TFC Academy
53	LA Galaxy	PASS			
54	Seattle Sounders FC (Note: #54: D.C. United → Seattle Sounders FC. March 4, 2014: Seattle Sounders FC acquired a third-round selection in the 2016 SuperDraft from D.C. United in exchange for midfielder Alex Caskey.)	(Bosnia and Herzegovina) Emir Alihodžić	Midfielder	Nebraska-Omaha	Mississippi Brilla
55	Montreal Impact	(United States) Brendan Hines-Ike	Defender	South Florida	Ocean City Nor'easters
56	Colorado Rapids (Note: #56: Seattle Sounders FC → Toronto FC → Colorado Rapids. January 18, 2016: Colorado Rapids acquired a third-round selection in the 2016 SuperDraft, a conditional first-round selection in the 2017 MLS SuperDraft, and targeted allocation money from Toronto FC in exchange for goalkeeper Clint Irwin. Confirmation needed → It is believed that Toronto FC had earlier acquired this third-round selection in the 2016 SuperDraft from Seattle Sounders FC as part of the trade for defender Eriq Zavaleta. This part of the trade was not announced by either club or MLS.)	(United States) Javan Torre	Defender	UCLA	Ventura County Fusion
57	Chicago Fire (Note: #57: Vancouver Whitecaps FC → New York Red Bulls → Chicago Fire. January 20, 2015: Chicago Fire acquired a third-round selection in the 2016 SuperDraft from New York Red Bulls in exchange for goalkeeper Kyle Reynish. Confirmation needed → Prior to 2015, it is believed that New York Red Bulls had acquired this pick from Vancouver Whitecaps FC as part of a trade involving midfielder Dane Richards. The SuperDraft part of any VAN-NYRB Richards trade was not announced by either club or MLS.)	(Germany) Vincent Keller	Defender	Creighton	
58	Colorado Rapids (Note: #58: FC Dallas → Colorado Rapids. January 14, 2016: Colorado Rapids acquired this third-round selection and a second-round (#37) selection in the 2016 SuperDraft from FC Dallas in exchange for a second-round (#33) selection in the 2016 SuperDraft.)	(France) Bradley Kamdem	Defender	UNLV	Calgary Foothills FC
59	Toronto FC (Note: #59: New York Red Bulls → Toronto FC. December 13, 2013: Toronto FC acquired a third-round selection in the 2016 SuperDraft, originally a first-round selection in the 2016 MLS Supplemental Draft, and a first-round selection in the 2014 MLS SuperDraft from New York Red Bulls in exchange for midfielder Bobby Convey and a second-round selection in the 2014 SuperDraft. The first-round Supplemental Draft pick became a third-round SuperDraft pick when the Supplemental Draft was eliminated.)	(United States) Mitchell Taintor	Midfielder	Rutgers	Real Boston Rams
60	Columbus Crew SC	(United States) Vince Cicciarelli	Forward	Saint Louis	Des Moines Menace
61	Portland Timbers	(United States) Wade Hamilton	Goalkeeper	Cal Poly	Lane United FC

=== Round 4 ===
Pick #	MLS team	Player	Position	College	Other
62	Chicago Fire	(Jamaica) Vincent Mitchell	Midfielder	Butler	Des Moines Menace
63	Colorado Rapids	(Democratic Republic of the Congo) John Manga	Forward	Cincinnati	Ocean City Nor'easters
64	Philadelphia Union	(United States) Cole Missimo	Midfielder	Northwestern	
65	Real Salt Lake (Note: #65: New York City FC → Real Salt Lake. August 11, 2014: Real Salt Lake acquired a fourth-round selection in the 2016 SuperDraft from New York City FC in exchange for defender Kwame Watson-Siriboe. The traded pick is New York City's natural selection.)	(United States) Connor Sparrow	Goalkeeper	Creighton	IMG Academy Bradenton
66	Real Salt Lake	PASS			
67	D.C. United (Note: #67: Houston Dynamo → D.C. United. December 8, 2014: D.C. United acquired a fourth-round selection in the 2016 SuperDraft and midfielder Andrew Driver from Houston Dynamo in exchange for goalkeeper Joe Willis and defender Samuel Inkoom.)	(Isle of Man) Liam Doyle	Defender	Ohio State	
68	Orlando City SC	(Nigeria) Tobenna Uzo	Forward	Coastal Carolina	
69	San Jose Earthquakes	(United States) Tyler Thompson	Midfielder	Stanford	Burlingame Dragons FC
70	Toronto FC	(United States) Darius Madison	Forward	UMBC	Reading United AC
71	Vancouver Whitecaps FC (Note: #71: New England Revolution → Vancouver Whitecaps FC. February 26, 2014: Vancouver Whitecaps FC acquired a fourth-round selection in the 2016 SuperDraft from New England Revolution in exchange for midfielder Daigo Kobayashi. The traded pick is New England's natural selection.)	(Wales) Josh Heard	Midfielder	Washington	Puget Sound Gunners FC
72	Sporting Kansas City	(United States) Faik Hajderovic	Midfielder	Saint Louis	
73	LA Galaxy	PASS			
74	D.C. United	PASS			
75	Montreal Impact	PASS			
76	Seattle Sounders FC	(United States) Michael Nelson	Defender	Old Dominion	
77	Vancouver Whitecaps FC	(United States) Tyler David	Defender	Saint Louis	
78	FC Dallas	(United States) Jacob Speed	Defender	SMU	Des Moines Menace
79	D.C. United (Note: #79: New York Red Bulls → D.C. United. January 13, 2016: D.C. United acquired this fourth-round selection in the 2016 SuperDraft from New York Red Bulls in exchange for the MLS rights to defender Kemar Lawrence. Although New York signed Lawrence on March 16, 2015 this trade was not announced until January 13, 2016.)	PASS			
80	Toronto FC (Note: #80: Columbus Crew → Toronto FC. Confirmation needed. July 2014: It is believed that Toronto FC acquired this fourth-round selection in the 2016 SuperDraft from Columbus Crew in exchange for allocation money. This trade was not announced by either club or MLS.)	(United States) Brian James	Midfielder	Penn State	
81	Portland Timbers	(United States) Trevor Morley	Defender	CSU Northridge	FC Tucson

== Other 2016 SuperDraft Trade Notes ==
- On June 6, 2013, Vancouver Whitecaps FC acquired a conditional selection in the 2016 SuperDraft and a second-round selection in the 2015 SuperDraft from D.C. United in exchange for defender Alain Rochat. The conditions to trigger the 2016 SuperDraft pick were not met.
- On January 6, 2015, Colorado Rapids received goalkeeper Zac MacMath on loan for the 2015 season from Philadelphia Union. The loan deal included a provision that Philadelphia would acquire a first-round selection in the 2016 SuperDraft from Colorado should Colorado execute a permanent transfer for MacMath at the end of the 2015 season. On November 5, 2015, Colorado announced it would not exercise the transfer option on MacMath.

== Notable undrafted players ==
=== Homegrown players ===
Original MLS team	Player	Position	College	Conference	Notes
Chicago Fire	Joey Calistri	Forward	Northwestern	Big Ten	
Chicago Fire	Drew Conner	Midfielder	Wisconsin	Big Ten	
FC Dallas	Aaron Guillen	Defender	Florida Gulf Coast	Atlantic Sun	
New York Red Bulls	Alex Muyl	Midfielder	Georgetown	Big East	
New York Red Bulls	Derrick Etienne	Midfielder	Virginia	ACC	
New York Red Bulls	Brandon Allen	Forward	Georgetown	Big East	
Seattle Sounders FC	Jordan Morris	Forward	Stanford	Pac-12	2015 Hermann Trophy winner 2016 MLS Rookie of the Year

=== Other notable players ===
Player	Pos	Affiliation	Played in MLS	Notes
Matt Turner	GK	Fairfield	2016–2022; 2025–	52 caps with U.S. national team; 2021 MLS All-Star MVP

== Summary ==
=== Selections by college athletic conference ===
Conference	Round 1	Round 2	Round 3	Round 4	Total
NCAA Division I conferences
ACC	8	5	2	0	15
America East	0	0	0	1	1
The American	2	0	1	2	5
Atlantic 10	0	2	2	2	6
Atlantic Sun	1	1	0	0	2
Big East	4	1	2	2	9
Big Ten	1	2	4	2	9
Big South	0	0	0	1	1
Big West	0	2	2	1	5
Conference USA	0	1	0	1	2
Ivy	0	1	1	0	2
MAC	1	0	1	0	2
Missouri Valley	1	0	0	0	1
Northeast	0	1	0	0	1
Pac-12	2	1	2	2	7
Summit	0	0	1	0	1
WAC	0	0	1	0	1
West Coast	0	1	0	0	1
Non-Division I conferences
CCAA	0	1	0	0	1
CCIW	0	1	0	0	1
Sunshine State	0	1	0	0	1
Other
Pass	0	0	1	5	6

=== Schools with multiple draft selections ===
Selections	Schools
4	Clemson, Creighton, Georgetown, North Carolina, Saint Louis, Washington
3	Cal Poly, Stanford
2	Cincinnati, Maryland, Ohio State, Rutgers, Syracuse, Wake Forest

=== Selections by position ===
Position	Round 1	Round 2	Round 3	Round 4	Total
Goalkeeper	2	0	2	1	5
Defender	8	6	6	5	25
Midfielder	7	7	6	6	26
Forward	3	8	5	3	19
Pass	0	0	1	5	6
