= Ian McIntyre (soccer) =

English footballer and coach (born 1972)

Personal information
- Date of birth: c. 1972 (age 53–54)
- Place of birth: Basildon, England
- Position: Sweeper

College career
Years	Team	Apps	(Gls)
1992–1995	Hartwick	79	(18)

Managerial career
- 1996–1998: Fairfield University (assistant)
- 1998–2002: Oneonta
- 2003–2009: Hartwick
- 2010–: Syracuse

Ian McIntyre (born 1972) is an English football coach and former player who is the coach of the Syracuse Orange men's soccer team. He previously coached at Oneonta and Hartwick.

== Early life ==
McIntyre grew up in Basildon, England and played for an Arsenal FC youth team.

== Playing career ==
McIntyre was a sweeper for the Hartwick Hawks from 1992 to 1995. The team had a 50–20–7 record during his four seasons as a player. The team also made 2 NCAA Tournament berths and a 52-20-7 record during his four seasons. McIntyre was named to the NSCAA All-American First Team in 1995. In that same year, he was named the Hartwick Male Athlete of the Year. He was inducted into the Hartwick College Athletic Hall of Fame in 2001, his first year of eligibility.

== Coaching career ==
McIntyre began his coaching career at Fairfield University as an assistant coach from 1996 to 1998 under former Hartwick assistant coach Carl Rees. During his time, the team had two consecutive Metro Atlantic Athletic Conference championship game appearances.

In 1998, he was hired as the head coach at Oneonta State and coached there until 2002. In 2003, his alma mater, Hartwick hired him as head coach.

After seven seasons at Hartwick, McIntyre was hired on as the head coach at Syracuse University by AD Daryl Gross. McIntyre inherited a struggling program from Dean Foti, who had coached at Syracuse from 1991 to 2009. The year before McIntyre took over, the Orange finished 3–15. In his first year, the team continued to struggle, posting a 2–10–5 record. However, McIntyre has led the team to great improvements in the following 5 years, winning an ACC Championship in 2015 and making several NCAA Tournament appearances. As of 2023, 19 players coached by McIntyre have been drafted to the MLS since 2010.

Ian McIntyre has brought the Orange to the 2022 National Championship, two NCAA Tournament College Cup in 2015 and 2022, and two ACC Conference Titles in 2015 and 2022. McIntyre was named the National College Coach of the Year in 2022, the ACC Coach of the Year in 2014 and 2022, and the Big East Coach of the Year in 2012.

== Honors & Awards ==
- 2022 NCAA Division I National Champions
- 2022 United Soccer Coaches College Coach of the Year
- 2022 NSCAA/USC South Region Coach of the Year
- 2022 ACC Coach of the Year
- 2022 ACC Atlantic Division Regular Season Champions
- 2022 ACC men's soccer tournament Champions
- 2015 ACC men's soccer tournament Champions
- 2014 ACC Coach of the Year
- 2014 NSCAA/USC South Region Coach of the Year
- 2014 ACC Atlantic Division Regular Season Champions
- 2012 BIG EAST Coaching Staff of the Year
- 2005 Atlantic Soccer Conference Coach of the Year
- 2004 NSCAA New York Region Coach of the Year
- 1999 Independent Coach of the Year

=== Head coaching record ===
Record table
Season	Team	Overall	Conference	Standing	Postseason
Oneonta (State University of New York Athletic Conference) (1999–2002)
1999	Oneonta	10–6–1			
2000	Oneonta	11–6–1			
2001	Oneonta	10–7–1			
2002	Oneonta	5–9–4			
Oneonta:		36–28–7			
Hartwick (Atlantic Soccer Conference) (2003–2006)
2003	Hartwick	15–2–1	3–1–1	2nd	
2004	Hartwick	13–3–3	4–1–0	2nd	
2005	Hartwick	13–6–1	5–1–0	1st	NCAA 1st Round
2006	Hartwick	8–10–2	3–2–1	T-2nd	
Hartwick (Atlantic Soccer Conference) (2007–2009)
2007	Hartwick	5–6–7	2–1–2	3rd	
2008	Hartwick	7–5–7	2–2–2	4th	
2009	Hartwick	10–4–4	3–2–2	2nd	
Hartwick:		71–36–25	22–10–8		
Syracuse (Big East Conference) (2010–2012)
2010	Syracuse	2–10–5	0–6–3		
2011	Syracuse	3–12–1	1–7–1		
2012	Syracuse	14–6–1	5–3–0	4th	NCAA Third Round
Syracuse (Atlantic Coast Conference) (2013–present)
2013	Syracuse	10–7–1	3–7–1	10th	
2014	Syracuse	16–4–1	5–2–1	T-1st (Atlantic)	NCAA Third Round
2015	Syracuse	16–5–4	3–4–1	4th (Atlantic)	ACC Champions; NCAA Semifinals
2016	Syracuse	12–4–4	4–2–3	4th (Atlantic)	NCAA Third Round
2017	Syracuse	6–8–4	0–6–2	6th (Atlantic)	
2018	Syracuse	7–7–4	1–4–3	5th (Atlantic)	NCAA Second Round
2019	Syracuse	8–7–5	2–4–2	6th (Atlantic)	NCAA Second Round
2020	Syracuse	2–7–4	0–6–3	6th (Atlantic)	
2021	Syracuse	8–8–2	2–5–1	5th (Atlantic)	
2022	Syracuse	19–2–4	5–1–2	1st (Atlantic)	ACC Champions; NCAA Champions
2023	Syracuse	9–5–7	2–1–5	3rd (Atlantic)	NCAA Second Round
2024	Syracuse	7–7–3	2–4–2	11th	
Syracuse:		139–99–50	24–45–24		
Total:		246–163–82			
National champion Postseason invitational champion Conference regular season champion Conference regular season and conference tournament champion Division regular season champion Division regular season and conference tournament champion Conference tournament champion
