= 2015 NCAA Division I men's soccer tournament =

2015 NCAA men's soccer tournament
College Cup

Tournament details
- Country: United States
- Dates: November 19 – December 13, 2015
- Teams: 48

Final positions
- Champions: Stanford
- Runners-up: Clemson
- Semifinalists: Syracuse; Akron

Tournament statistics
- Matches played: 47
- Goals scored: 125 (2.66 per match)
- Top goal scorer(s): Jordan Morris; Stanford (5 goals)

Awards
- Best player: Jordan Morris; Stanford (Offense MOP); Brandon Vincent; Stanford (Defense MOP)
- All statistics correct as of December 13, 2015.

The 2015 NCAA Division I men's soccer tournament (also known as the 2015 College Cup) was the 57th annual single-elimination tournament to determine the national champion of NCAA Division I men's collegiate soccer. The first, second, third, and quarterfinal rounds were held at college campus sites across the United States during November and December 2015, with host sites determined by seeding and record. The four-team College Cup finals were played at Children's Mercy Park in Kansas City, Kansas from December 11–13, 2015.

The defending national champions, the Virginia Cavaliers, were eliminated in the tournament's second round. Stanford won their first-ever national title by defeating Clemson, 4–0 in the final.

== Qualification ==
All Division I men's soccer programs except for Grand Canyon, Incarnate Word, UMass Lowell, and Northern Kentucky were eligible to qualify for the tournament. Those four programs were ineligible because they were in transition from Division II to Division I. The tournament field remained fixed at 48 teams.

Of the 23 schools that had previously won the championship, 13 qualified for this year's tournament.

== Format ==
As in previous editions of the NCAA Division I Tournament, the tournament featured 48 participants out of a possible field of 202 teams. Of the 48 berths, 24 were allocated to the 21 conference tournament champions and to the regular season winners of the Ivy League, Pac-12 Conference, and West Coast Conference, which do not have tournaments. The remaining 24 berths were supposed to be determined through an at-large process based upon the Ratings Percentage Index (RPI) of teams that did not automatically qualify.

The NCAA Selection Committee also named the top sixteen seeds for the tournament, with those teams receiving an automatic bye into the second round of the tournament. The remaining 32 teams played in a single-elimination match in the first round of the tournament for the right to play a seeded team in the second round.

Seeded teams
Seed	School	Conference	Record	Berth type	NSCAA Ranking	RPI Ranking
1	Wake Forest	Atlantic Coast Conference	15–2–2	At-large	1	1
2	Clemson	Atlantic Coast Conference	15–2–2	At-large	2	2
3	Georgetown	Big East Conference	15–2–2	Tournament Champion	3	5
4	Akron	Mid-American Conference	15–3–2	Tournament Champion	10	6
5	North Carolina	Atlantic Coast Conference	14–1–3	At-large	4	4
6	Syracuse	Atlantic Coast Conference	13–5–3	Tournament Champion	13	3
7	Notre Dame	Atlantic Coast Conference	11–4–5	At-large	9	7
8	Stanford	Pac-12 Conference	14–2–2	Season champion	6	8
9	Ohio State	Big Ten Conference	13–4–2	At-large	12	11
10	Maryland	Big Ten Conference	11–5–4	Tournament champion	Not ranked	13
11	Seattle	Western Athletic Conference	17–3–1	Tournament champion	15	9
12	Creighton	Big East Conference	17–3–0	At-large	5	10
13	Denver	The Summit League	15–0–3	Tournament champion	8	18
14	South Florida	American Athletic Conference	11–5–3	At-large	14	14
15	UC Santa Barbara	Big West Conference	13–6–2	At-large	Not ranked	17
16	Indiana	Big Ten Conference	12–5–2	At-large	22	21

== Schedule ==
2015 Quarterfinal sites (blue) and College Cup (red)

Round	Date
First round	November 19, 2015
Second round	November 22, 2015
Third round	November 28–29, 2015
Quarterfinals	December 4 − 5, 2015
College Cup: Semifinals	December 11, 2015
College Cup Final	December 13, 2015

== Bracket ==
=== Regional 1 ===
First round
Charlotte	2
Radford	1
Connecticut	3
Boston U	1
Dayton PK	2(4)
Oakland	2(3)
Cal State Fullerton	0
Santa Clara	3

Second round
1	Wake Forest	1
Charlotte	0
Connecticut	0
16	Indiana	1
9	Ohio State PK	1(4)
Dayton	1(3)
Santa Clara	1
8	Stanford	3

Third round
1	Wake Forest	1
16	Indiana	0
9	Ohio State	1
8	Stanford	3

Quarterfinals
1	Wake Forest	1
8	Stanford OT	2

=== Regional 2 ===
First round
Coastal Carolina	1
North Florida	0
Kentucky	1
Drake	2
SMU	2
Utah Valley	0
Rutgers PK	1(3)
LIU Brooklyn	1(2)

Second round
5	North Carolina	2
Coastal Carolina	1
Drake	1
12	Creighton	5
13	Denver	0
SMU AET	1
Rutgers	1
4	Akron	6

Third round
5	North Carolina	0
12	Creighton	1
SMU	1
4	Akron	2

Quarterfinals
12	Creighton	2
4	Akron AET	3

=== Regional 3 ===
First round
Hofstra OT	2
Lehigh	1
Boston College	1
Vermont	0
UCLA	2
Cal Poly	0
Dartmouth OT	1
Hartwick	0

Second round
3	Georgetown	3
Hofstra	0
Boston College OT	2
14	South Florida	1
11	Seattle	1
UCLA	0
Dartmouth	1
6	Syracuse	2

Third round
3	Georgetown	1(4)
Boston College PK	1(5)
11	Seattle	1
6	Syracuse	3

Quarterfinals
Boston College	0
6	Syracuse	1

=== Regional 4 ===
First round
Tulsa OT	3
FIU	2
Virginia	2
Rider	0
South Carolina PK	1(2)
Furman	1(1)
Elon	3
Winthrop	0

Second round
7	Notre Dame PK	1(3)
Tulsa	1(0)
Virginia	0
10	Maryland	1
15	UC Santa Barbara OT	1
South Carolina	0
Elon	2
2	Clemson	5

Third round
7	Notre Dame	1
10	Maryland	2
15	UC Santa Barbara	2
2	Clemson	3

Quarterfinals
10	Maryland	1(1)
2	Clemson PK	1(3)

=== College Cup ===
Semifinals; December 11; Children's Mercy Park; Kansas City, Kansas
8	Stanford PK	0(8)
4	Akron	0(7)
6	Syracuse	0(1)
2	Clemson PK	0(4)

Championship; December 13; Children's Mercy Park; Kansas City, Kansas
8	Stanford	4
2	Clemson	0

== Results ==
Home team through quarterfinals on left

=== First round ===
November 19, 2015	Connecticut	3–1	Boston U	Storrs, Connecticut
12:30 EST	Brown 54'; Awuah 76', 83'	Report	De Bona 30'	Stadium: Morrone Stadium; Attendance: 1,423; Referee: Carlos Fernandes

November 19, 2015	Dartmouth	1–0 (a.e.t.)	Hartwick	Hanover, New Hampshire
5:00 EST	Marsh 100'	Report		Stadium: Burnham Field; Attendance: 518

November 19, 2015	Boston College	1–0	Vermont	Chestnut Hill, Massachusetts
6:00 EST	Enström 71'	Report		Stadium: Newton Soccer Complex; Attendance: 555; Referee: Lou Labbadia

November 19, 2015	Hofstra	2–1 (a.e.t.)	Lehigh	Hempstead, New York
7:00 EST	Ruiz 77'; Massey 100'	Report	Forrest 21'	Stadium: Hofstra Soccer Stadium; Attendance: 305; Referee: Jan Halaska

November 19, 2015	Kentucky	1–2	Drake	Lexington, Kentucky
7:00 EST	Barajas 20'	Report	Bartlett 19'; Grunert 75'	Stadium: UK Soccer Complex; Attendance: 651; Referee: Hilario Grajeda

November 19, 2015	Coastal Carolina	1–0	North Florida	Conway, South Carolina
7:00 EST	Melchor 6'	Report		Stadium: CCU Soccer Field; Attendance: 214; Referee: Richonne Clark

November 19, 2015	Rutgers	1–1 (a.e.t.) (3–2 p)	LIU Brooklyn	Piscataway, New Jersey
7:00 EST	Faheem 76'	Report	Hestnes 31'	Stadium: Yurcak Field; Attendance: 204; Referee: Robert Sibiga
	Penalties
	Correa (penalty scored); Taintor (penalty scored); Wright (penalty missed); B. Tetro (penalty scored)		(penalty missed) Hansen; (penalty scored) Nordström; (penalty scored) T. Sica; (penalty missed) Wahlin; (penalty missed) Gregorian

November 19, 2015	Dayton	2–2 (a.e.t.) (4–3 p)	Oakland	Dayton, Ohio
7:00 EST	Nwabia 45'; Sendin 72'	Report	Rickard 8'; Ricci 23'	Stadium: Baujan Field; Attendance: 1,150; Referee: Chris Penso
	Penalties
	Schoonderwoerd (penalty scored); Amankona (penalty scored); Haupt (penalty scored); Amankwaah (penalty scored)		(penalty scored) Rickard; (penalty scored) Ben; (penalty scored) Reynolds; (penalty missed) Ricci; (penalty missed) VanderLaan

November 19, 2015	South Carolina	1–1 (a.e.t.) (2–1 p)	Furman	Columbia, South Carolina
7:00 EST	Deakin 58'	Report	Hawke 90'	Stadium: Stone Stadium; Attendance: 720; Referee: Mark Kadlecik
	Penalties
	Nyboe (penalty scored); Deakin (penalty missed); Ericson (penalty missed); Turner (penalty scored); Arambula (penalty missed)		(penalty scored) McInnis; (penalty missed) Pinner; (penalty missed) Carrizales; (penalty missed) Santibanez; (penalty missed) Ortiz

November 19, 2015	Elon	3–0	Winthrop	Elon, North Carolina
7:00 EST	Brace 34'; Alvarez 79'; Vandermaas-Peeler 86'	Report		Stadium: Rudd Field; Attendance: 2,419; Referee: Carmen Serbio

November 19, 2015	Virginia	2–0	Rider	Charlottesville, Virginia
7:00 EST	Salandy-Defour 68'; Rozhansky 88'	Report		Stadium: Klöckner Stadium; Attendance: 488; Referee: Mark Gorak

November 19, 2015	Charlotte	2–1	Radford	Charlotte, North Carolina
7:30 EST	Waechter 42'; Bronico 84'	Report	Summers 60' (pen.)	Stadium: Transamerica Field; Attendance: 824; Referee: Dustin Thorne

November 19, 2015	Tulsa	3–2 (a.e.t.)	FIU	Tulsa, Oklahoma
8:00 EST	Sánchez 52'; Dee 56'; Velasquez 95'	Report	Betancur 17'; Fountain 82'	Stadium: Hurricane Soccer & Track Stadium; Attendance: 482; Referee: Shane Butler

November 19, 2015	SMU	2–0	Utah Valley	University Park, Texas
8:00 EST	Lee 24'; Camara 62'	Report		Stadium: Westcott Field; Attendance: 555; Referee: Nima Saghafi

November 19, 2015	UCLA	2–0	Cal Poly	Los Angeles, California
10:00 EST	Vale 59'; Wilcox 77' (o.g.)	Report		Stadium: Drake Stadium; Attendance: 766; Referee: Ian Anderson

November 19, 2015	Cal State Fullerton	0–3	Santa Clara	Fullerton, California
10:00 EST		Report	Urias 10'; Delgadillo 37'; Cardona 53' (pen.)	Stadium: Titan Stadium; Attendance: 946; Referee: Alex Gorin

=== Second round ===
November 22, 2015	#16 Indiana	1–0	Connecticut	Bloomington, Indiana
12:00 EST	Maurey 39'	Report		Stadium: Bill Armstrong Stadium; Attendance: 618; Referee: Brandon Artis

November 22, 2015	#1 Wake Forest	1–0	Charlotte	Winston-Salem, North Carolina
1:00 EST	Bakero 83'	Report		Stadium: Spry Stadium; Attendance: 2,699; Referee: Carmen Serbio

November 22, 2015	#9 Ohio State	1–1 (a.e.t.) (4–3 p)	Dayton	Columbus, Ohio
1:00 EST	Jensen 73'	Report	Schoonderwoerd 50'	Stadium: Jesse Owens Memorial Stadium; Attendance: 851; Referee: Sorin Stoica
	Penalties
	Jensen (penalty scored); Mohamed (penalty scored); Mason (penalty scored); Robertson (penalty missed); Culbertson (penalty scored)		(penalty scored) Schoonderwoerd; (penalty scored) Amankona; (penalty missed) Haupt; (penalty scored) Amankwaah; (penalty missed) Sendin

November 22, 2015	#3 Georgetown	3–0	Hofstra	Washington, D.C.
1:00 EST	Basuljevic 5'; Allen 87' (pen.); Muyl 90'	Report		Stadium: Shaw Field; Attendance: 844; Referee: Andrew Chapin

November 22, 2015	#14 South Florida	1–2 (a.e.t.)	Boston College	Tampa, Florida
1:00 EST	Figbe 89'	Report	Normesinu 74'; Enström 98'	Stadium: USF Soccer Stadium; Attendance: 1,015; Referee: Randy Cook

November 22, 2015	#6 Syracuse	2–1	Dartmouth	Syracuse, New York
2:00 EST	Polk 33'; Cross 55'	Report	Donawa 30'	Stadium: SU Soccer Stadium; Attendance: 1,120; Referee: Robert Sibiga

November 22, 2015	#7 Notre Dame	1–1 (a.e.t.) (3–0 p)	Tulsa	Notre Dame, Indiana
2:00 EST	Farina 24'	Report	Sánchez 62'	Stadium: Alumni Stadium; Attendance: 222; Referee: Chris Penso
	Penalties
	Holdan (penalty scored); Aubrey (penalty missed); Gallagher (penalty scored); Lachowecki (penalty scored)		(penalty missed) Velasquez; (penalty missed) Duit; (penalty missed) Dee

November 22, 2015	#12 Creighton	5–1	Drake	Omaha, Nebraska
2:00 EST	Lopez-Espin 9', 65'; Perez 16'; Waldrep 69'; Pitter 89'	Report	Enna 81'	Stadium: Morrison Stadium; Attendance: 2,212; Referee: Edvin Jurisevic

November 22, 2015	#4 Akron	6–1	Rutgers	Akron, Ohio
4:00 EST	Souto 5' (pen.); Holthusen 13', 17'; Laryea 13', 18'; Sepe 60'	Report	Al Awwad 81'	Stadium: FirstEnergy Stadium; Attendance: 2,025; Referee: Hilario Grajeda

November 22, 2015	#10 Maryland	1–0	Virginia	College Park, Maryland
5:00 EST	Williamson 38'	Report		Stadium: Ludwig Field; Attendance: 2,737; Referee: Mark Kadlecik

November 22, 2015	#5 North Carolina	2–1	Coastal Carolina	Chapel Hill, North Carolina
6:00 EST	T. Hume 2'; Wright 85'	Report	Uzo 87'	Stadium: Fetzer Field; Attendance: 1,036; Referee: Mike Stutt

November 22, 2015	#2 Clemson	5–2	Elon	Clemson, South Carolina
6:00 EST	Casner 27', 48'; Moreno 39'; Chinchilla 73'; Mafi 81' (pen.)	Report	Fortune 49'; Vandermaas-Peeler 78'	Stadium: Riggs Field; Attendance: 1,941; Referee: Richonne Clark

November 22, 2015	#13 Denver	0–1 (a.e.t.)	SMU	Denver, Colorado
7:00 EST		Report	Garcia 94'	Stadium: Denver Soccer Stadium; Attendance: 1,013; Referee: Younes Marrakchi

November 22, 2015	#8 Stanford	3–1	Santa Clara	Stanford, California
8:00 EST	Vincent 58'; Bashti 75', 87'	Report	Autran 28'	Stadium: Laird Q. Cagan Stadium; Attendance: 1,079; Referee: Jesus Cisneros

November 22, 2015	#11 Seattle	1–0	UCLA	Seattle, Washington
9:00 EST	Haddadi 40'	Report		Stadium: Championship Field; Attendance: 1,800; Referee: Josh Wilkens

November 22, 2015	#15 UC Santa Barbara	1–0 (a.e.t.)	South Carolina	Santa Barbara, California
9:00 EST	Jome 93'	Report		Stadium: Harder Stadium; Attendance: 2,519; Referee: Hector Perez

=== Third round ===
November 28, 2015	#5 North Carolina	0–1	#12 Creighton	Chapel Hill, North Carolina
7:00 EST		Report	Pitter 38'	Stadium: Fetzer Field; Attendance: 1,432; Referee: Mark Kadlecik

November 29, 2015	#6 Syracuse	3–1	#11 Seattle	Syracuse, New York
1:00 EST	Robinson 2'; Rhynhart 20'; Miller 71'	Report	Olsen 67'	Stadium: SU Soccer Stadium; Attendance: 1,134; Referee: Mark Allatin

November 29, 2015	#1 Wake Forest	1–0	#16 Indiana	Winston-Salem, North Carolina
1:00 EST	Greensfelder 88'	Report		Stadium: Spry Stadium; Attendance: 3,149; Referee: Hilario Grajeda

November 29, 2015	#3 Georgetown	1–1 (a.e.t.) (4–5 p)	Boston College	Washington, D.C.
1:00 EST	Rosenberry 60'	Report	Davock 19'	Stadium: Shaw Field; Attendance: 913; Referee: Mark Gorak
	Penalties
	Allen (penalty scored); Turnley (penalty scored); Rosenberry (penalty missed); Lema (penalty scored); Campbell (penalty scored)		(penalty scored) Kapp; (penalty scored) Davock; (penalty scored) Lewis; (penalty scored) Salama; (penalty scored) Zeugner

November 29, 2015	#7 Notre Dame	1–2	#10 Maryland	Notre Dame, Indiana
2:00 EST	Berneski 41'	Report	Magalhães 21'; Williamson 38'	Stadium: Alumni Stadium; Attendance: 331; Referee: Fotis Bazakos

November 29, 2015	#4 Akron	2–1	SMU	Akron, Ohio
4:00 EST	Soares 25'; Curtis 43' (o.g.)	Report	Ruhaak 32' (o.g.)	Stadium: FirstEnergy Stadium; Attendance: 2,280; Referee: Peter Dhima

November 29, 2015	#2 Clemson	3–2	#15 UC Santa Barbara	Clemson, South Carolina
6:00 EST	Jones 45'; Campos 69'; Chinchilla 79'	Report	Kim 39'; Feucht 70'	Stadium: Riggs Field; Attendance: 1,015; Referee: Edvin Jurisevic

November 29, 2015	#8 Stanford	3–1	#9 Ohio State	Stanford, California
8:00 EST	Morris 53', 78'; Baird 88'	Report	Mohamed 62'	Stadium: Laird Q. Cagan Stadium; Attendance: 1,634; Referee: Ian Anderson

=== Quarterfinals ===
December 4, 2015	#2 Clemson	1–1 (a.e.t.) (3–1 p)	#10 Maryland	Clemson, South Carolina
7:00 EST	Moreno 58'	Report	Crognale 73'	Stadium: Riggs Field; Attendance: 3,411; Referee: Peter Dhima
	Penalties
	Mafi (penalty scored); Murphy (penalty missed); Melvin (penalty missed); Casner (penalty scored); Moreno (penalty scored)		(penalty scored) Carboz; (penalty missed) Crognale; (penalty missed) Endoh; (penalty missed) Korvah

December 5, 2015	#6 Syracuse	1–0	Boston College	Syracuse, New York
2:00 EST	Polk 79'	Report		Stadium: SU Soccer Stadium; Attendance: 1,923; Referee: John McCloskey

December 5, 2015	#4 Akron	3–2 (a.e.t.)	#12 Creighton	Akron, Ohio
4:00 EST	Souto 60' (pen.); Holthusen 80'; Najem 102'	Report	Castellanos 64'; Perez 85'	Stadium: FirstEnergy Stadium; Attendance: 3,043; Referee: Hilario Grajeda

December 5, 2015	#1 Wake Forest	1–2 (a.e.t.)	#8 Stanford	Winston-Salem, North Carolina
7:00 EST	Harkes 70' (pen.)	Report	Morris 18'; Langsdorf 97'	Stadium: Spry Stadium; Attendance: 4,906; Referee: Ted Unkel

=== College Cup ===
==== Semifinals ====
December 11, 2015	#2 Clemson	0–0 (a.e.t.) (4–1 p)	#6 Syracuse	Kansas City, Kansas
6:00 EST		Report		Stadium: Children's Mercy Park; Attendance: 4,047; Referee: Mark Gorak
	Penalties
	Mafi (penalty scored); Melvin (penalty scored); Moreno (penalty scored); Casner (penalty scored)		(penalty missed) Alseth; (penalty scored) Büscher; (penalty missed) Sewerin

December 11, 2015	#4 Akron	0–0 (a.e.t.) (7–8 p)	#8 Stanford	Kansas City, Kansas
8:30 EST		Report		Stadium: Children's Mercy Park; Attendance: 4,047; Referee: Mark Kadlecik
	Penalties
	Sanda (penalty scored); Ruhaak (penalty scored); Gainford (penalty scored); Najem (penalty missed); Souto (penalty scored); Souders (penalty scored); Soares (penalty missed); Belana (penalty scored); Dakwar (penalty scored); Shultz (penalty missed)		(penalty missed) Skundrich; (penalty scored) Vincent; (penalty scored) M. Verso; (penalty scored) Morris; (penalty scored) E. Verso; (penalty scored) Mosharrafa; (penalty missed) Meehan; (penalty scored) Nana-Sinkam; (penalty scored) Werner; (penalty scored) Baird

==== Championship ====
December 13, 2015	#2 Clemson	0–4	#8 Stanford	Kansas City, Kansas
2:00 EST		Report	Morris 2', 51'; Vincent 71' (pen.); E. Verso 74'	Stadium: Children's Mercy Park; Attendance: 4,081; Referee: Chris Penso

== Statistics ==
=== Goalscorers ===
5 goals

- (United States) Jordan Morris — Stanford

3 goals

- (New Zealand) Stuart Holthusen — Akron

2 goals

- (Canada) Richie Laryea — Akron
- (Brazil) Victor Souto — Akron
- (Sweden) Simon Enström — Boston College
- (United States) T. J. Casner — Clemson
- (Costa Rica) Saul Chinchilla — Clemson
- (Brazil) Thales Moreno — Clemson
- (Canada) Kwame Awuah — Connecticut
- (United States) Ricky Lopez-Espin — Creighton
- (Mexico) Ricardo Perez — Creighton
- (Germany) Timo Pitter — Creighton
- (United States) Cooper Vandermaas-Peeler — Elon
- (United States) Eryk Williamson — Maryland
- (United States) Amir Bashti — Stanford
- (United States) Brandon Vincent — Stanford
- (England) Ben Polk — Syracuse
- (United States) Juan Sebastián Sánchez — Tulsa

1 goal

- (United States) Adam Najem — Akron
- (United States) Sean Sepe — Akron
- (Portugal) Gonçalo Soares — Akron
- (United States) Trevor Davock — Boston College
- (Ghana) Isaac Normesinu — Boston College
- (Brazil) Felix De Bona — Boston University
- (Costa Rica) Diego Campos — Clemson
- (England) Aaron Jones — Clemson
- (Norway) Iman Mafi — Clemson
- (United States) Brandt Bronico — Charlotte
- (United States) Luke Waechter — Charlotte
- (United States) Martin Melchor — Coastal Carolina
- (Nigeria) Tobenna Uzo — Coastal Carolina
- (United States) DeAndrae Brown — Connecticut
- (United States) Fernando Castellanos — Creighton
- (United States) Evan Waldrep — Creighton
- (Bermuda) Justin Donawa — Dartmouth
- (Jamaica) Alexander Marsh — Dartmouth
- (Nigeria) Kennedy Nwabia — Dayton
- (Netherlands) Maik Schoonderwoerd — Dayton
- (Spain) Carlos Sendin — Dayton
- (United States) Alec Bartlett — Drake
- (United States) Steven Enna — Drake
- (United States) James Grunert — Drake
- (Honduras) Eduardo Alvarez — Elon
- (England) James Brace — Elon
- (England) Jaiden Fortune — Elon
- (Puerto Rico) Luis Betancur — FIU
- (England) Brad Fountain — FIU
- (Scotland) Lewis Hawke — Furman
- (United States) Brandon Allen — Georgetown
- (United States) Arun Basuljevic — Georgetown
- (United States) Alex Muyl — Georgetown
- (United States) Keegan Rosenberry — Georgetown
- (England) Daniel Massey — Hofstra
- (United States) Mario Ruiz — Hofstra
- (United States) Ben Maurey — Indiana
- (United States) Kevin Barajas — Kentucky
- (United States) Mark Forrest — Lehigh
- (Norway) Simon Hestnes — LIU Brooklyn
- (United States) Alex Crognale — Maryland
- (Brazil) Ivan Magalhães — Maryland
- (United States) Tucker Hume — North Carolina
- (United States) Zach Wright — North Carolina
- (United States) Patrick Berneski — Notre Dame
- (United States) Jeffrey Farina — Notre Dame
- (Canada) Austin Ricci — Oakland
- (England) Matt Rickard — Oakland
- (United States) Danny Jensen — Ohio State
- (United States) Abdi Mohamed — Ohio State
- (England) Jamie Summers — Radford
- (Jordan) Sugor Al Awwad — Rutgers
- (United States) Ahmad Faheem — Rutgers
- (United States) Dylan Autran — Santa Clara
- (United States) Edson Cardona — Santa Clara
- (United States) Carlos Delgadillo — Santa Clara
- (United States) Luis Urias — Santa Clara
- (Algeria) Hamza Haddadi — Seattle
- (United States) David Olsen — Seattle
- (Mali) Idrissa Camara — SMU
- (United States) Stanton Garcia — SMU
- (United States) Brenden Lee — SMU
- (England) Danny Deakin — South Carolina
- (Nigeria) Prosper Figbe — South Florida
- (United States) Corey Baird — Stanford
- (United States) Foster Langsdorf — Stanford
- (United States) Eric Verso — Stanford
- (England) Louis Cross — Syracuse
- (Canada) Kamal Miller — Syracuse
- (United States) Noah Rhynhart — Syracuse
- (United States) Miles Robinson — Syracuse
- (United States) Geoffrey Dee — Tulsa
- (Nicaragua) Miguel Velasquez — Tulsa
- (New Zealand) Jordan Vale — UCLA
- (Germany) Kevin Feucht — UC Santa Barbara
- (The Gambia) Ismaila Jome — UC Santa Barbara
- (South Korea) Seo-In Kim — UC Santa Barbara
- (United States) Jake Rozhansky — Virginia
- (United States) Marcus Salandy-Defour — Virginia
- (Spain) Jon Bakero — Wake Forest
- (United States) Ricky Greensfelder — Wake Forest
- (United States) Ian Harkes — Wake Forest

Own goals

- (United States) Brad Ruhaak — Akron (playing against SMU)
- (United States) Austin Wilcox — Cal Poly (playing against UCLA)
- (United States) Taylor Curtis — SMU (playing against Akron)

== See also ==
- NCAA Men's Soccer Championships (Division II, Division III)
- NCAA Women's Soccer Championships (Division I, Division II, Division III)
