= 2015 Notre Dame Fighting Irish men's soccer team =

American college soccer season

2015 Notre Dame Fighting Irish men's soccer

Mike Berticelli Tournament Champions adidas/IU Credit Union Classic Co-Champions
- Conference: Atlantic Coast Conference
- Record: 13–8–8 (3–2–2 ACC)
- Head coach: Bobby Clark (15th season)
- Assistant coaches: Greg Dalby (4th season); B. J. Craig (8th season)
- Home stadium: Alumni Stadium

2015 ACC men's soccer standings
	Conf.					Overall
Team	W		L		T	W		L		T
Atlantic
No. 1 Wake Forest +	6	–	0	–	2	17	–	3	–	2
No. 3 Clemson +	6	–	1	–	1	16	–	2	–	3
Boston College +	4	–	4	–	0	11	–	8	–	2
No. 6 Syracuse ‡	3	–	4	–	1	16	–	5	–	3
Louisville	1	–	4	–	3	7	–	9	–	3
NC State	1	–	4	–	3	8	–	6	–	3
Coastal
No. 4 North Carolina +	6	–	1	–	1	15	–	2	–	3
No. 8 Notre Dame +	4	–	2	–	2	11	–	5	–	6
No. 18 Virginia +	4	–	2	–	2	10	–	5	–	3
Duke	3	–	4	–	1	10	–	7	–	2
Virginia Tech	0	–	5	–	3	5	–	9	–	3
Pittsburgh	0	–	7	–	1	5	–	9	–	3
‡ - ACC Tournament champion + - Invited to the NCAA Division I Men's Soccer Championship; As of December 5, 2015; Rankings from NSCAA

The 2015 Notre Dame Fighting Irish men's soccer team represented University of Notre Dame during the 2015 NCAA Division I men's soccer season. It was the 39th season of the university fielding a program.

== 2015 squad ==
Note: Flags indicate national team as defined under FIFA eligibility rules; some limited exceptions apply. Players may hold more than one non-FIFA nationality.

No.	Pos.	Nation	Player
0	GK	USA	Ryan Krutz
1	GK	USA	Brian Talcott
3	MF	USA	Connor Klekota
4	DF	USA	Matt Habrowski
5	MF	FRA	Félicien Dumas
6	DF	USA	Max Lachowecki
7	MF	USA	Danny Lojek
8	FW	IRL	Jon Gallagher
9	FW	USA	Jeffrey Farina
10	DF	USA	Brandon Aubrey
11	MF	USA	Sean Dedrick
12	MF	USA	Kyle Dedrick
13	GK	USA	Chris Hubbard
14	MF	USA	Andrew Cupero

No.	Pos.	Nation	Player
15	MF	USA	Evan Panken
16	DF	USA	Michael Shipp
17	MF	SCO	Sean MacLeod
18	MF	USA	Oliver Harris
19	MF	USA	Patrick Connolly
20	MF	USA	Blake Townes
21	MF	USA	Thomas Ueland
22	FW	USA	Ian Aschieris
23	MF	USA	Myles Brown
24	DF	USA	Mark Mishu
25	DF	USA	Patrick Berneski
26	MF	USA	Mark Gormley
27	MF	USA	Patrick Hodan

== Schedule ==
Date Time, TV	Rank^{#}	Opponent^{#}	Result	Record	Site City, State
Exhibition
08-16-2015*; 7:00 pm	No. 4	at Ohio State	L 1–2		Owens Stadium; Columbus, OH
08-19-2015*; 7:00 pm	No. 4	at Butler	W 1–0		Butler Bowl; Indianapolis, IN
08-24-2015*; 7:00 pm	No. 4	No. 22 Saint Louis	W 1–0		Alumni Stadium; Notre Dame, IN
Regular Season
08-28-2015*; 7:00 pm	No. 4	vs. No. 13 Maryland adidas/IU Credit Union Classic	T 0–0 ^{2OT}	0–0–1	Bill Armstrong Stadium (3,273); Bloomington, IN
08-30-2015*; 7:00 pm, BTN	No. 4	at No. 14 Indiana adidas/IU Credit Union Classic	W 1–0 ^{2OT}	1–0–1	Bill Armstrong Stadium (4,426); Bloomington, IN
09-04-2015*; 7:30 pm	No. 5	No. 24 South Florida; Mike Berticelli Memorial Tournament	W 2–0	2–0–1	Alumni Stadium (1,731); Notre Dame, IN
09-06-2015; 2:00 pm	No. 5	UAB; Mike Berticelli Memorial Tournament	W 4–0	3–0–1	Alumni Stadium (1,496); Notre Dame, IN
09-12-2015; 7:00 pm	No. 2	No. 9 Clemson	W 1–0	4–0–1 (1–0–0)	Alumni Stadium (1,379); Notre Dame, IN
09-15-2015*	No. 2	Xavier	L 0–1	4–1–1	Alumni Stadium (721); Notre Dame, IN
09-18-2015	No. 2	at No. 3 North Carolina	L 2–4	4–2–1 (1–1–0)	Fetzer Field (1,406); Chapel Hill, NC
09-22-2015*	No. 14	at Michigan State	W 4–0	5–2–1	DeMartin Soccer Complex (532); East Lansing, MI
09-25-2015	No. 14	No. 4 Virginia	W 3–1	6–2–1 (2–1–0)	Alumni Stadium (1,726); Notre Dame, IN
09-29-2015*	No. 7	Marquette	W 4–2	7–2–1	Alumni Stadium (721); Notre Dame, IN
10-04-2015	No. 7	at NC State	T 1–1 ^{2OT}	7–2–2 (2–1–1)	Dail Stadium (588); Raleigh, NC
10-07-2015*	No. 7	Michigan	T 1–1 ^{2OT}	7–2–3	Alumni Stadium (1,626); Notre Dame, IN
10-10-2015	No. 7	Duke	W 3–2 ^{OT}	8–2–3 (3–1–1)	Alumni Stadium (2,018); Notre Dame, IN
10-16-2015	No. 7	at Virginia Tech	T 0–0 ^{2OT}	8–2–4 (3–1–2)	Sandra D. Thompson Field (1,084); Blacksburg, VA
10-20-2015*	No. 8	at Northwestern	T 1–1 ^{2OT}	8–2–5	Lakeside Field (374); Evanston, IL
10-23-2015	No. 8	at No. 2 Wake Forest	L 1–2	8–3–5 (3–2–2)	Spry Stadium (3,976); Winston-Salem, NC
10-31-2015	No. 14	Pittsburgh	W 5–0	9–3–5 (4–2–2)	Alumni Stadium (782); Notre Dame, IN
ACC Tournament
11-08-2015	No. 9	No. 17 Virginia; Quarterfinals	W 1–0	10–3–5	Alumni Stadium (494); Notre Dame, IN
11-11-2015	No. 9	No. 1 Wake Forest; Semifinals	W 1–0	11–3–5	Spry Stadium (5,009); Winston-Salem, NC
11-15-2015	No. 9	No. 13 Syracuse; Finals	L 0–1	11–4–5	Alumni Stadium (960); Notre Dame, IN
NCAA Tournament
11-22-2015	(7) No. 8	Tulsa; Second round	T 1–1 (3–0 PKs) ^{2OT}	11–4–6	Alumni Stadium (222); Notre Dame, IN
11-29-2015	(7) No. 8	(10) No. 12 Maryland; Third round	L 1–2	11–5–6	Alumni Stadium (331); Notre Dame, IN
*Non-conference game. ^{#}Rankings from United Soccer Coaches. (#) Tournament seedings in parentheses.

== See also ==
- Notre Dame Fighting Irish men's soccer
- 2015 Atlantic Coast Conference men's soccer season
- 2015 NCAA Division I men's soccer season
- 2015 ACC Men's Soccer Tournament
- 2015 NCAA Division I Men's Soccer Championship
