= 2015 Wake Forest Demon Deacons men's soccer team =

American college soccer season

2015 Wake Forest Demon Deacons men's soccer
- Conference: Atlantic Coast Conference
- Record: 14–1–2 (6–0–2 ACC)
- Head coach: Bobby Muuss (1st season)
- Assistant coach: Steve Armas (1st season)
- Home stadium: Spry Stadium

2015 ACC men's soccer standings
	Conf.					Overall
Team	W		L		T	W		L		T
Atlantic
No. 1 Wake Forest +	6	–	0	–	2	17	–	3	–	2
No. 3 Clemson +	6	–	1	–	1	16	–	2	–	3
Boston College +	4	–	4	–	0	11	–	8	–	2
No. 6 Syracuse ‡	3	–	4	–	1	16	–	5	–	3
Louisville	1	–	4	–	3	7	–	9	–	3
NC State	1	–	4	–	3	8	–	6	–	3
Coastal
No. 4 North Carolina +	6	–	1	–	1	15	–	2	–	3
No. 8 Notre Dame +	4	–	2	–	2	11	–	5	–	6
No. 18 Virginia +	4	–	2	–	2	10	–	5	–	3
Duke	3	–	4	–	1	10	–	7	–	2
Virginia Tech	0	–	5	–	3	5	–	9	–	3
Pittsburgh	0	–	7	–	1	5	–	9	–	3
‡ - ACC Tournament champion + - Invited to the NCAA Division I Men's Soccer Championship; As of December 5, 2015; Rankings from NSCAA

The 2015 Wake Forest Demon Deacons men's soccer team represented Wake Forest University during the 2015 NCAA Division I men's soccer season. It was the 69th season of the university fielding a program. It was the program's first season with Bobby Muuss as head coach. Muuss, the fourth head coach in program history, formerly coached Denver, and took over for Jay Vidovich, who left for a head coaching position with Portland Timbers 2. The team finished the regular season ranked #1 nationally and with the best record in the Atlantic Coast Conference, earning the top seed both in the 2015 ACC Men's Soccer Tournament and the 2015 NCAA Division I Men's Soccer Championship.

== Roster ==
As of 2015: Note: Flags indicate national team as defined under FIFA eligibility rules; some limited exceptions apply. Players may hold more than one non-FIFA nationality.

No.	Pos.	Nation	Player
0	GK	(United States) USA	Alec Ferrell
1	GK	(United States) USA	Andrew Harris
2	DF	(United States) USA	Kris Reaves
3	DF	(United States) USA	Rafael Fagundo
4	DF	(United States) USA	Kevin Politz
6	DF	(United States) USA	Jared Odenbeck
7	MF	(Spain) ESP	Jon Bakero
8	MF	(United States) USA	Jacori Hayes
9	FW	(United States) USA	Tater Rennhack
10	FW	(United States) USA	Michael Gamble
11	DF	(United States) USA	Philip Parker
12	MF	(United States) USA	Brad Dunwell
14	MF	(United States) USA	Thomas Haws
15	MF	(United States) USA	Steven Echvarria
16	MF	(United States) USA	Ian Harkes

No.	Pos.	Nation	Player
17	MF	(United States) USA	John Schuman
19	MF	(United States) USA	Harrison Gregory
20	MF	(United States) USA	Hunter Bandy
21	MF	(United States) USA	Hayden Partain
22	MF	(England) ENG	Jack Harrison
23	FW	(United States) USA	Hank Gauger
24	DF	(United States) USA	Chase Rhode
25	MF	(United States) USA	Ricky Greensfelder
26	DF	(United States) USA	Sam Raben
27	MF	(United States) USA	Roman Martin
28	FW	(New Zealand) NZL	Tane Gent
29	FW	(United States) USA	Logan Gdula
30	GK	(United States) USA	Grant Bishop
31	GK	(United States) USA	Carter Richardson

== Schedule ==
Date Time, TV	Rank^{#}	Opponent^{#}	Result	Record	Site (Attendance) City, State
Preseason
08-16-2015*; 7:00 pm		at Furman	T 1–1 ^{2OT}		Stone III Stadium; Greenville, SC
08-22-2015*; 7:00 pm		Kentucky	W 3–0		Spry Stadium; Winston-Salem, NC
Regular season
08-28-2015*; 7:00 pm		Santa Clara	W 3–0	1–0–0	Spry Stadium (2,455); Winston-Salem, NC
08-28-2015*; 7:00 pm		FIU	W 3–2	2–0–0	Spry Stadium (1,604); Winston-Salem, NC
09-05-2015*; 7:00 pm	No. 20	No. 19 Florida Gulf Coast	W 1–0	3–0–0	Spry Stadium (1,790); Winston-Salem, NC
09-08-2015*; 7:00 pm	No. 14	UNC Asheville	W 5–0	4–0–0	Spry Stadium (1,363); Winston-Salem, NC
09-12-2015; 7:00 pm	No. 14	at Pittsburgh	W 4–0	5–0–0 (1–0–0)	Ambrose Urbanic Field (371); Pittsburgh, PA
09-15-2015*; 7:00 pm	No. 7	No. 18 Elon	L 0–1	5–1–0 (1–0–0)	Spry Stadium (2,204); Winston-Salem, NC
09-19-2015; 7:00 pm, ESPN3	No. 7	Syracuse	W 3–1	6–1–0 (2–0–0)	Spry Stadium (3,454); Winston-Salem, NC
09-22-2015*; 7:00 pm	No. 8	at No. 6 Akron	W 2–1	7–1–0 (2–0–0)	FirstEnergy Stadium (2,516); Akron, OH
09-26-2015; 7:00 pm	No. 8	No. 5 Clemson	T 1–1	7–1–1 (2–0–1)	Spry Stadium (2,346); Winston-Salem, NC
10-02-2015; 7:00 pm	No. 4	at No. 22 Boston College	W 5–0	8–1–1 (3–0–1)	Newton Soccer Complex (276); Chestnut Hill, MA
10-06-2015*; 7:00 pm, ESPN3	No. 4	No. 15 South Carolina	W 2–0	9–1–1 (3–0–1)	Spry Stadium (1,848); Winston-Salem, NC
10-09-2015; 7:00 pm, ESPN3	No. 4	at No. 22 NC State; Tobacco Road	T 0–0	9–1–2 (3–0–2)	Dail Stadium (644); Raleigh, NC
10-17-2015; 7:00 pm, ESPN3	No. 4	No. 2 North Carolina; Tobacco Road rivalry	W 1–0	10–1–2 (4–0–2)	Spry Stadium (5,070); Winston-Salem, NC
10-20-2015*; 7:00 pm	No. 2	Georgia State	W 5–0	11–1–2 (4–0–2)	Spry Stadium (1,437); Winston-Salem, NC
10-23-2015; 7:00 pm, ESPN3	No. 2	No. 4 Notre Dame	W 2–1	12–1–2 (5–0–2)	Spry Stadium (3,976); Winston-Salem, NC
10-27-2015*; 7:00 pm	No. 2	Davidson	W 4–0	13–1–2 (5–0–2)	Spry Stadium (749); Winston-Salem, NC
10-30-2015; 7:00 pm, ESPN3	No. 2	at Louisville	W 4–2	14–1–2 (6–0–2)	Lynn Stadium (2,664); Louisville, KY
ACC Tournament
11-08-2015; 1:00 pm	No. 1	Louisville	W 2–1 ^{(a.e.t.)}	15–1–2	Spry Stadium (2,189); Winston-Salem, NC
11-11-2015; 7:00 pm, ESPN3	No. 1	No. 8 Notre Dame	L 0-1	15–2–2	Spry Stadium (5,009); Winston-Salem, NC
NCAA Tournament
11-22-2015; 1:00 pm, ESPN3	No. 1	Charlotte	W 1–0	16–2–2	Spry Stadium (2,699); Winston-Salem, NC
11-29-2015; 1:00 pm, ESPN3	No. 1	No. 14 Indiana	W 1–0	17–2–2	Spry Stadium (3,149); Winston-Salem, NC
12-05-2015; 7:00 pm, ESPN3	No. 1	No. 7 Stanford	L 1–2 ^{(a.e.t.)}	17–3–2	Spry Stadium (4,906); Winston-Salem, NC
*Non-conference game. ^{#}Rankings from United Soccer Coaches. (#) Tournament seedings in parentheses.

== See also ==
- Wake Forest Demon Deacons men's soccer
- 2015 Atlantic Coast Conference men's soccer season
- 2015 NCAA Division I men's soccer season
- 2015 ACC Men's Soccer Tournament
- 2015 NCAA Division I Men's Soccer Championship
