= 2015 North Carolina Tar Heels men's soccer team =

American college soccer season

2015 North Carolina Tar Heels men's soccer
- Conference: Atlantic Coast Conference
- Record: 15–2–3 (6–1–1 ACC)
- Head coach: Carlos Somoano (4th season)
- Assistant coaches: Jason O'Keefe (1st season); Grant Porter (4th season)
- Home stadium: Fetzer Field

2015 ACC men's soccer standings
	Conf.					Overall
Team	W		L		T	W		L		T
Atlantic
No. 1 Wake Forest +	6	–	0	–	2	17	–	3	–	2
No. 3 Clemson +	6	–	1	–	1	16	–	2	–	3
Boston College +	4	–	4	–	0	11	–	8	–	2
No. 6 Syracuse ‡	3	–	4	–	1	16	–	5	–	3
Louisville	1	–	4	–	3	7	–	9	–	3
NC State	1	–	4	–	3	8	–	6	–	3
Coastal
No. 4 North Carolina +	6	–	1	–	1	15	–	2	–	3
No. 8 Notre Dame +	4	–	2	–	2	11	–	5	–	6
No. 18 Virginia +	4	–	2	–	2	10	–	5	–	3
Duke	3	–	4	–	1	10	–	7	–	2
Virginia Tech	0	–	5	–	3	5	–	9	–	3
Pittsburgh	0	–	7	–	1	5	–	9	–	3
‡ - ACC Tournament champion + - Invited to the NCAA Division I Men's Soccer Championship; As of December 5, 2015; Rankings from NSCAA

The 2015 North Carolina Tar Heels men's soccer team represented the University of North Carolina at Chapel Hill during the 2015 NCAA Division I men's soccer season. It was the 69th season of the university fielding a program.

North Carolina advanced to the third round of the 2015 College Cup, where they lost to Creighton.

== Schedule ==
Date Time, TV	Rank^{#}	Opponent^{#}	Result	Record	Site City, State
Preseason
08-14-2015*; 7:00 pm	No. 5	Winthrop	W 4–1		Fetzer Field; Chapel Hill, NC
08-16-2015*; 11:00 am	No. 5	Blue/White Scrimmage			Fetzer Field; Chapel Hill, NC
08-19-2015*; 7:00 pm	No. 5	Davidson	W 5–4		Fetzer Field; Chapel Hill, NC
08-19-2015*; 7:00 pm	No. 5	at No. 21 Coastal Carolina	W 2–0		CCU Soccer Field; Conway, SC
Regular Season
08-28-2015*; 7:00 pm	No. 5	FIU	W 1–0	1–0–0	Fetzer Field (3,233); Chapel Hill, NC
08-30-2015*; 7:00 pm, ESPN3	No. 5	Santa Clara	W 3–0	2–0–0	Fetzer Field (610); Chapel Hill, NC
09-04-2015*; 7:00 pm	No. 4	William & Mary	T 1–1 ^{2OT}	2–0–1	Fetzer Field (802); Chapel Hill, NC
09-06-2015*; 7:00 pm	No. 4	Tulsa	W 2–1	3–0–1	Fetzer Field (836); Chapel Hill, NC
09-11-2015; 7:00 pm	No. 3	at Virginia Tech	W 2–0	4–0–1 (1–0–0)	Thompson Field (1,769); Blacksburg, VA
09-18-2015; 5:00 pm	No. 3	No. 2 Notre Dame	W 4–2	5–0–1 (2–0–0)	Fetzer Field (2,806); Chapel Hill, NC
09-21-2015*; 7:00 pm	No. 3	North Florida	W 2–1	6–0–1	Fetzer Field (436); Chapel Hill, NC
09-26-2015; 7:00 pm	No. 2	Duke	W 2–1	7–0–1 (3–0–0)	Fetzer Field (2,010); Chapel Hill, NC
10-02-2015; 7:00 pm	No. 2	at Pittsburgh	W 2–0	8–0–1 (4–0–0)	Ambrose Urbanic Field (579); Pittsburgh, PA
10-06-2015*; 7:00 pm	No. 2	UNC Wilmington	W 3–0	9–0–1	Fetzer Field (1,110); Chapel Hill, NC
10-10-2015; 7:00 pm	No. 2	No. 22 Syracuse	W 2–1	10–0–1 (5–0–0)	Fetzer Field (728); Chapel Hill, NC
10-13-2015*; 7:00 pm	No. 2	Charleston	W 3–2	11–0–1	Fetzer Field (518); Chapel Hill, NC
10-17-2015; 7:00 pm	No. 2	at No. 5 Wake Forest	L 0–1	11–1–1 (5–1–0)	Spry Stadium (5,070); Winston-Salem, NC
10-20-2015*; 7:00 pm	No. 6	at Campbell	W 6–1	12–1–1	Eakes Complex (301); Buies Creek, NC
10-23-2015; 5:00 pm	No. 6	Louisville	W 2–1	13–1–1 (6–1–0)	Fetzer Field (1,823); Chapel Hill, NC
10-27-2015*; 7:00 pm	No. 5	Northeastern	W 1–0	14–1–1	Fetzer Field (236); Chapel Hill, NC
10-30-2015; 7:00 pm	No. 5	at No. 18 Virginia	T 0–0 ^{2OT}	14–1–2 (6–1–1)	Klöckner Stadium (2,366); Charlottesville, VA
ACC Tournament
11-08-2015; 1:00 pm	(2) No. 5	(7) No. 15 Syracuse; Quarterfinals	T 1–1 (3–4 PKs) ^{2OT}	14–1–3	Fetzer Field (1,407); Chapel Hill, NC
NCAA Tournament
11-22-2015; 6:00 pm	(5) No. 4	No. 20 Coastal Carolina; Second round	W 2–1	15–1–3	Fetzer Field (1,036); Chapel Hill, NC
11-28-2015; 7:00 pm	(5) No. 4	(12) No. 9 Creighton; Third round	L 0–1	15–2–3	Fetzer Field (1,432); Chapel Hill, NC
*Non-conference game. ^{#}Rankings from United Soccer Coaches. (#) Tournament seedings in parentheses.

== See also ==
- North Carolina Tar Heels men's soccer
- 2015 Atlantic Coast Conference men's soccer season
- 2015 NCAA Division I men's soccer season
- 2015 ACC Men's Soccer Tournament
- 2015 NCAA Division I Men's Soccer Championship
