= 2015 Virginia Cavaliers men's soccer team =

American college soccer season

2015 Virginia Cavaliers men's soccer
- Conference: Atlantic Coast Conference
- Record: 10–5–3 (4–2–2 ACC)
- Head coach: George Gelnovatch (20th season)
- Assistant coaches: Matt Chulis (10th season); Terry Boss (2nd season)
- Home stadium: Klöckner Stadium

2015 ACC men's soccer standings
	Conf.					Overall
Team	W		L		T	W		L		T
Atlantic
No. 1 Wake Forest +	6	–	0	–	2	17	–	3	–	2
No. 3 Clemson +	6	–	1	–	1	16	–	2	–	3
Boston College +	4	–	4	–	0	11	–	8	–	2
No. 6 Syracuse ‡	3	–	4	–	1	16	–	5	–	3
Louisville	1	–	4	–	3	7	–	9	–	3
NC State	1	–	4	–	3	8	–	6	–	3
Coastal
No. 4 North Carolina +	6	–	1	–	1	15	–	2	–	3
No. 8 Notre Dame +	4	–	2	–	2	11	–	5	–	6
No. 18 Virginia +	4	–	2	–	2	10	–	5	–	3
Duke	3	–	4	–	1	10	–	7	–	2
Virginia Tech	0	–	5	–	3	5	–	9	–	3
Pittsburgh	0	–	7	–	1	5	–	9	–	3
‡ - ACC Tournament champion + - Invited to the NCAA Division I Men's Soccer Championship; As of December 5, 2015; Rankings from NSCAA

The 2015 Virginia Cavaliers men's soccer team will be the college's 75th season of playing organized men's college soccer, and their 62nd season playing in the Atlantic Coast Conference. The Cavaliers enter the season as the defending national champions.

== Schedule ==
Date Time, TV	Rank^{#}	Opponent^{#}	Result	Record	Site City, State
England Tour
March 10*		vs. Crystal Palace U-21	W 4–0		Hayes Lane; Bromley, ENG
March 11*		at Blackburn Rovers U-21	T 2–2		Leigh Sports Village; Leigh, ENG
March 13*		at Burnley U-21	T 2–2		Turf Moor Auxiliary Fields; Burnley, ENG
Spring Season
March 29*		Maryland			Klöckner Stadium; Charlottesville, VA
April 4*		VCU	T 0–0		Klöckner Stadium; Charlottesville, VA
April 11*		American	L 1–3		Klöckner Stadium; Charlottesville, VA
April 19*		Elon	T 1–1		Klöckner Stadium; Charlottesville, VA
Preseason
August 18*; 7:00 pm		Radford	T 1–1 ^{2OT}		Klöckner Stadium; Charlottesville, VA
Regular Season
August 29*; 7:00 pm	No. 2	No. 17 Charlotte	W 1–0	1–0–0	Klöckner Stadium (4,620); Charlottesville, VA
September 4*; 7:00 pm	No. 2	Tulsa	T 1–1 ^{2OT}	1–0–1	Klöckner Stadium (1,540); Charlottesville, VA
September 8*; 7:00 pm	No. 2	George Mason	W 2–1	2–0–1	Klöckner Stadium (1,164); Charlottesville, VA
September 11; 7:00 pm, ESPN3	No. 5	at Duke	T 2–2 ^{2OT}	2–0–2 (0–0–1)	Koskinen Stadium (1,187); Durham, NC
September 15*; 7:00 pm	No. 6	James Madison	W 2–0	3–0–2	Klöckner Stadium (1,245); Charlottesville, VA
September 18; 7:00 pm	No. 6	No. 20 NC State	W 1–0	4–0–2 (1–0–0)	Klöckner Stadium; Charlottesville, VA
September 22*; 7:00 pm	No. 6	at VCU; Piedmont Cup	W 1–0	5–0–2	Sports Backers Stadium (1,650); Richmond, VA
September 25; 7:00 pm	No. 4	at No. 14 Notre Dame	L 1–3	5–1–2 (1–1–1)	Alumni Stadium (1,726); Notre Dame, IN
September 29*; 7:00 pm		George Washington	Cancelled		Klöckner Stadium; Charlottesville, VA
October 2; 7:00 pm	No. 11	Louisville	W 3-2	6-2-1 (2-1-1)	Klöckner Stadium (908); Charlottesville, VA
October 5*; 7:00 pm	No. 11	Portland	W 3-2	7-2-1	Klöckner Stadium (1196); Charlottesville, VA
October 9; 8:00 pm	No. 10	at Boston College	L 2-1	7-2-2 (2-2-1)	Newton Soccer Complex (588); Newton, MA
October 13*; 7:00 pm	No. 12	American	L 0-1	7-3-2	Klöckner Stadium (1284); Charlottesville, VA
October 16; 8:00 pm	No. 12	at Pitt	W 3-1	8-3-2 (3-2-1)	Klöckner Stadium (2195); Charlottesville VA
October 23; 7:30 pm	No. 16	at Virginia Tech; Commonwealth Cup	W 1-0	9–3–2 (4–2–1)	Sandra D. Thompson Field (2028); Blacksburg, VA
October 30; 7:00 pm	No. 13	No. 5 UNC	T 0-0 ^{2OT}	9–3–3 (4–2–2)	Klöckner Stadium (2366); Charlottesville, VA
ACC Tournament
November 8; 1:00 pm	(5) No. 17	(4) No. 9 Notre Dame; Quarterfinals	L 0–1	9–4–3	Alumni Stadium (494); Notre Dame, IN
NCAA Tournament
November 19; 7:00 pm	No. 18	Rider; Second round	W 2–0	10–4–3	Klöckner Stadium (488); Charlottesville, VA
November 22; 5:00 pm	No. 18	(10) No. 12 Maryland; Third round	L 0–1	10–5–3	Ludwig Field (2,737); College Park, MD
*Non-conference game. ^{#}Rankings from United Soccer Coaches. (#) Tournament seedings in parentheses.
