= Brandon Vincent =

American soccer player

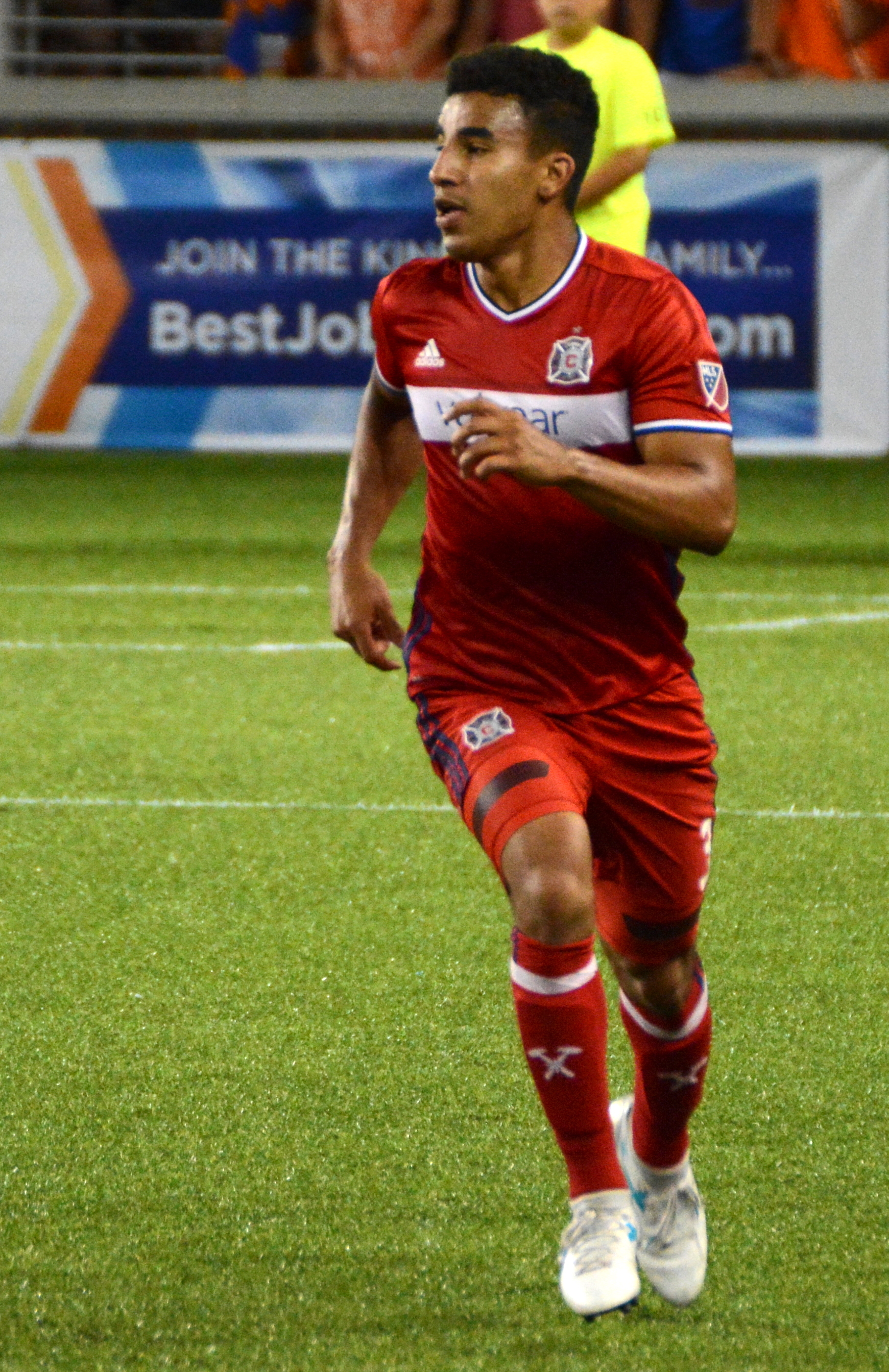
- Vincent playing for Chicago Fire in 2017

Personal information
- Date of birth: May 1, 1994 (age 32)
- Place of birth: Los Angeles, California, United States
- Height: 1.80 m (5 ft 11 in)
- Position: Defender

Youth career
- 2008–2012: Real So Cal

College career
Years	Team	Apps	(Gls)
2012–2015	Stanford Cardinal	80	(13)

Senior career*
Years	Team	Apps	(Gls)
2012–2013	Ventura County Fusion	12	(0)
2015	Portland Timbers U23s	1	(0)
2016–2018	Chicago Fire	85	(3)

International career
2016	United States	1	(0)
- * Club domestic league appearances and goals

Brandon Vincent (born May 1, 1994) is an American former professional soccer player who played as a defender for the Chicago Fire in Major League Soccer. Vincent grew up playing in the U.S. Soccer Development Academy for Real So Cal.

== Career ==
After spending four years with Stanford Cardinal at Stanford University, Vincent was drafted as the fourth overall pick in the 2016 MLS SuperDraft by the Chicago Fire. Chicago acquired the pick and General Allocation Money from NYCFC in exchange for Jack Harrison. He was named to the MLS All-Star team in his first season. On July 5, 2017, Vincent scored his first professional MLS goal against Portland Timbers. On October 30, 2018, Vincent announced, via Twitter, his retirement from professional soccer.

== International ==
On February 5, 2016, Vincent made his international debut for the United States, coming on as a halftime substitute against Canada.

== Career statistics ==
As of October 28, 2018

Club	Season	League			Domestic Cup		League Cup		Continental		Total	
Club	Season	Division	Apps	Goals	Apps	Goals	Apps	Goals	Apps	Goals	Apps	Goals
Chicago Fire	2016	MLS	26	0	4	0	0	0	0	0	30	0
Chicago Fire	2017	MLS	27	2	2	0	1	0	0	0	30	2
Chicago Fire	2018	MLS	32	1	2	0	0	0	0	0	34	1
Career total			85	3	8	0	1	0	0	0	94	3
