= Iman Mafi =

Norwegian footballer (born 1994)

Personal information
- Full name: Iman Mafi
- Date of birth: 9 July 1994 (age 32)
- Place of birth: Kristiansand, Norway
- Height: 1.75 m (5 ft 9 in)
- Positions: Left-back; midfielder

Team information
- Current team: Jerv
- Number: 19

Youth career
- –2011: Jerv

College career
Years	Team	Apps	(Gls)
2013–2014	Gardner–Webb Runnin' Bulldogs	18	(3)
2014–2017	Clemson Tigers	51	(6)

Senior career*
Years	Team	Apps	(Gls)
2011–2013	Jerv	0	(0)
2017–2018	Vindbjart	15	(0)
2018–2020	Kongsvinger	39	(0)
2020–	Jerv	132	(5)
- * Club domestic league appearances and goals as of 3 November 2025

Iman Mafi (Persian: ایمان مافی; born 9 July 1994) is a Norwegian professional footballer who plays as a left-back for Norwegian First Division club Jerv.

== Personal life ==
His parents emigrated from Iran to Norway in 1986. He grew up in Grimstad. Following the death of Mahsa Amini and ensuing protests, Mafi played with black tape around his wrists, illuding black armbands.

== Career ==
Iman Mafi was born in Kristiansand and played youth football in Norway for Jerv.

Mafi played college soccer in the United States for the Gardner–Webb Runnin' Bulldogs where he scored 3 goals in 18 matches before transferring to the Clemson Tigers where he scored a goal in the 2015 NCAA Division I Men's Soccer Tournament, played in the 2015 NCAA Division I Men's Soccer Championship Game against Stanford, and took part in the 2017 MLS SuperDraft.

Mafi made his Eliteserien debut for Jerv on 6 July 2022 against Molde at the Aker Stadion during the 2022 Eliteserien season.

== Career statistics ==
As of 7 July 2022

Appearances and goals by club, season and competition
Club	Season	League			Cup		Other		Total	
Club	Season	Division	Apps	Goals	Apps	Goals	Apps	Goals	Apps	Goals
Jerv	2012	2. divisjon	—		2	0	—		2	0
Vindbjart	2017	2. divisjon	15	0	0	0	—		15	0
Kongsvinger	2018	1. divisjon	19	0	3	0	—		22	0
Kongsvinger	2019	1. divisjon	20	0	4	0	2	0	26	0
Kongsvinger	Total		39	0	7	0	2	0	48	0
Jerv	2020	1. divisjon	26	1	—		—		26	1
Jerv	2021	1. divisjon	27	1	2	0	2	0	31	1
Jerv	2022	Eliteserien	1	0	0	0	—		1	0
Jerv	Total		54	2	2	0	—		58	2
Career total			108	2	11	0	4	0	123	2

== Honours ==
=== Individual ===
- 2013 Big South All-Freshman Team
- 2015 All-ACC Third Team
- 2015 All-ACC Academic Team
