= Danny Deakin =

English footballer (born 1993)

Personal information
- Full name: Kevin Daniel Deakin
- Date of birth: 6 September 1993 (age 33)
- Place of birth: Sheffield, England
- Height: 1.75 m (5 ft 9 in)
- Position: Attacking midfielder

Team information
- Current team: Staveley Miners Welfare

Youth career
- Handsworth
- Sheffield Wednesday
- 2006–2012: Sheffield United

College career
Years	Team	Apps	(Gls)
2013–2014	Mercyhurst Lakers	45	(24)
2015–2016	South Carolina Gamecocks	41	(18)

Senior career*
Years	Team	Apps	(Gls)
2012	Matlock Town		
2012	Belper Town		
2013	Erie Admirals	16	(5)
2014	FC London	11	(2)
2015	Erie Commodores	12	(7)
2016	Detroit City	9	(1)
2017	Orlando City	0	(0)
2017	Orlando City B (loan)	3	(0)
2017	Orlando City B	17	(1)
2018	Curzon Ashton	1	(0)
2018–2019	Detroit City	24	(6)
2019–2020	Sheffield	9	(1)
2020–2021	Hallam	7	(1)
2021–2022	Rossington Main	30	(4)
2022	Hallam	9	(4)
2022–2024	Rossington Main	46	(4)
2024	Retford United	15	(3)
2024–2026	Stocksbridge Park Steels	66	(4)
2026-	Staveley Miners Welfare		
- * Club domestic league appearances and goals as of 20:32, 11 Jan 2026 (UTC)

Danny Deakin (born 6 September 1993) is an English footballer who plays as an attacking midfielder for Staveley Miners Welfare.

== Career ==
Deakin played as part of the academy at Sheffield United from 2006, until he was released by the club in 2012. Following his release from Sheffield United, Deakin had spells with Matlock Town and Belper Town.

Deakin moved to the United States to play college soccer at Mercyhurst University in 2013, before transferring to the University of South Carolina in 2015. While at college, Deakin spent time with USL PDL side FC London, and NPSL sides Erie Commodores (formerly Erie Admirals) and Detroit City FC.

On 17 January 2017, Deakin was selected by Orlando City in the 2017 MLS SuperDraft in the third round (64th overall). He officially signed with the club on 3 March 2017. Shortly after signing, Deakin was sent to Orlando City's USL affiliate Orlando City B on loan. He made his debut for Orlando City B on 25 March 2017 against Tampa Bay Rowdies.

Deakin moved permanently to Orlando City B on 19 April 2017.

On April 10, 2018 it was announced that Deakin would return to Detroit City Football Club for their 2018 campaign.

On October 30, 2020 it was announced that Deakin had signed for Hallam.

In July 2024, Deakin joined Stocksbridge Park Steels.
