= T. J. Casner =

American association football player

T.J. Casner
Personal information
- Full name: Robert Casner
- Date of birth: September 28, 1994 (age 32)
- Place of birth: Irvine, California, United States
- Height: 5 ft 7 in (1.70 m)
- Positions: Forward; winger

Youth career
- 2009–2010: LA Galaxy
- 2010–2011: Pateadores

College career
Years	Team	Apps	(Gls)
2012–2015	Clemson Tigers	80	(17)

Senior career*
Years	Team	Apps	(Gls)
2016–2017	Rio Grande Valley	57	(5)
2016	→ Houston Dynamo (loan)	0	(0)
- * Club domestic league appearances and goals as of 16:48, 21 October 2017 (UTC)

Robert "T.J." Casner (born September 28, 1994) is an amateur American soccer player.

== Career ==
=== College & Semi-Professional ===
Casner played four years of college soccer at Clemson University from 2012 to 2015. In 2015, Casner was named to the First Team All-ACC as well as the First Team All-Region selections. Following these accolades, Casner was also named a Third Team All-American.

=== Professional ===
On January 19, 2016, Casner was selected 47th overall in the 2016 MLS SuperDraft by Houston Dynamo. He joined their United Soccer League affiliate Rio Grande Valley in March, 2016.

Casner made his professional debut for Rio Grande Valley on March 26, 2016, versus Tulsa Roughnecks FC.

Casner made his professional debut for Houston on June 15 in the Lamar Hunt U.S. Open Cup game versus San Antonio FC. Casner was subbed on in the 71st minute for Damarcus Beasley.
