= Julian Engels =

German footballer (born 1993)

Personal information
- Full name: Julian Felix Engels
- Birth name: Julian Felix Büscher
- Date of birth: 22 April 1993 (age 33)
- Place of birth: Soest, Germany
- Height: 1.78 m (5 ft 10 in)
- Position: Midfielder

Youth career
- 2008–2011: VfL Bochum

College career
Years	Team	Apps	(Gls)
2014–2015	Syracuse Orange	45	(8)

Senior career*
Years	Team	Apps	(Gls)
2011–2013	Preußen Münster	4	(0)
2013	Sportfreunde Lotte	5	(0)
2015	K–W United	2	(1)
2016–2017	D.C. United	27	(1)
2017	→ Rochester Rhinos (loan)	12	(0)
2018	LA Galaxy II	21	(1)
2019	Cavalry FC	23	(5)
2020	TuS Haltern	6	(0)
2020–2021	Bonner SC	0	(0)
Total		100	(8)
- * Club domestic league appearances and goals

Julian Felix Engels (né Büscher; born 22 April 1993) is a German former professional footballer who played as a midfielder.

Before moving to North America for college, Engels played for VfL Bochum, Preußen Münster and Sportfreunde Lotte. He played college soccer for the Syracuse Orange and at club level with K–W United, before turning professional with MLS side D.C. United. Engels also played with LA Galaxy II and Cavalry FC before returning to Germany.

== Career ==
=== Early career ===
Prior to playing in the United States, Engels competed for both VfL Bochum and Preußen Münster.

In 2014, Engels joined the Syracuse Orange men's soccer program. During his freshman year, Engels became an immediate starter for the Orange. There, he earned All-ACC Second Team honors and was named to the ACC All-Freshman Team. Engels tallied his first collegiate assist on 27 September 2014 in a 1–0 win against the second-ranked Virginia. The assist to Skylar Thomas, gave the Orange a 1–0 win against Virginia.

Throughout his freshman season, Engels earned a reputation of being a set piece specialist. His assists in subsequent matches against Albany, Bucknell, Duke and Georgetown led to three game winning matches.

Engels returned to Syracuse for his sophomore season where he remain a key cog in the Orange lineup. Engels lead the team in assists and was second on the team in goals scored, en route to the program's first-ever college cup run. Engels played in and started in all 25 matches the Orange played in 2015.

=== D.C. United ===
Engels was selected 11th overall in the 2016 MLS SuperDraft by D.C. United. He made his United debut on 23 February 2016, in a CONCACAF Champions League quarterfinal match against Queretaro F.C. On 1 March 2016, he scored his first professional goal in the return leg of the Champions League against Queretaro, in a 1–1 draw. Engels made his MLS debut on 6 March 2016 in a 4–1 loss at LA Galaxy, coming on for Luciano Acosta in the 75th minute. He scored his first MLS goal against Orlando City SC for D.C. United on 24 September 2016.

On 14 August 2017, Engels was loaned to the USL side, Rochester Rhinos for the remainder of the 2017 USL season.

On 28 November 2017, his contract option with United was declined.

=== LA Galaxy II ===
On 15 March 2018, Engels signed with LA Galaxy II of the United Soccer League. He made his debut on 17 March 2018 in a 2–0 loss to the Colorado Springs Switchbacks. On 8 August 2018, his contract with LA Galaxy II was mutually terminated.

=== Cavalry FC ===
On 13 February 2019, Engels signed with Canadian Premier League club Cavalry FC for the team and league's inaugural season.

He scored his first goal for Cavalry FC on 22 May 2019 versus Pacific FC in the Canadian Championship. Engels finished the season with six goals and four assists in all competitions, helping Cavalry finish first in both the spring and fall seasons and qualifying for the 2019 Canadian Premier League Finals. Engels was praised for his performance and listed as one of the best midfielders, and players, in the league.

=== Back to Germany ===
On 1 February 2020, Engels returned to Germany, signing with Regionalliga side TuS Haltern.

Engels left Haltern to join Bonner SC in August 2020 on a deal until June 2021. Less than two weeks after signing, he suffered a serious injury, when he tore his posterior cruciate ligament and was set to be out for one year.

== Personal life ==
Engels was born in Soest, North Rhine-Westphalia and grew up in nearby Dülmen.

In addition to playing for Cavalry FC, Engels coached youth soccer with Calgary Chinooks Soccer Club.

In May 2021, he married Sarah Engels, taking on her maiden name.

== Honours ==
Calvary FC

- Canadian Premier League Finals: runners-up 2019
- Canadian Premier League (Regular season): Spring 2019, Fall 2019
