= Ben Polk =

American soccer player

Personal information
- Full name: Benjamin David Polk
- Date of birth: September 19, 1992 (age 34)
- Place of birth: Phoenix, Arizona, USA
- Height: 1.78 m (5 ft 10 in)
- Position: Forward

Youth career
- 2002–2008: Oxford United
- 2010–2011: Banbury United

College career
Years	Team	Apps	(Gls)
2013	GCC Cougars	15	(13)
2013–2014	Herkimer Generals	34	(46)
2015	Syracuse Orange	23	(12)

Senior career*
Years	Team	Apps	(Gls)
2011–2013	Banbury United	57	(4)
2012–2013	→ Bedworth United (loan)	17	(1)
2015	K-W United	12	(9)
2016	Portland Timbers	0	(0)
2016	→ Portland Timbers 2 (loan)	25	(1)
2017	Orlando City B	8	(0)
- * Club domestic league appearances and goals as of 16 October 2017

Benjamin Polk (born 19 September 1992) is an American soccer player.

== Career ==
Polk began his career in the youth setup of Oxford United, but was released after six years with the club. He later signed with local side Banbury United, where he played as a midfielder until 2013 when he accepted a college soccer scholarship at Genesee Community College. After one year with Genesee, Polk transferred to Herkimer County Community College in 2013, and again in 2015 when he spent a year at Syracuse University.

While at college, Polk spent time with Premier Development League side K-W United FC in 2015.

On January 14, 2016, Polk was selected in the first round (20th overall) of the 2016 MLS SuperDraft by Portland Timbers.

Polk signed with United Soccer League side Orlando City B on December 6, 2016. His contract expired in October 2017.
