= Syracuse Orange men's soccer =

Men's soccer team of Syracuse University

- 2026 Syracuse Orange men's soccer team
- Founded: 1920; 106 years ago
- University: Syracuse University
- Head coach: Ian McIntyre (17th season)
- Conference: ACC (2013–present)
- Location: Syracuse, New York, US
- Stadium: SU Soccer Stadium (capacity: 1,500)
- Nickname: Orange
- Colors: Orange and Blue
Home	Away

Pre-tournament ISFA/ISFL championships
- 1936

NCAA tournament championships
- 2022

NCAA tournament College Cup
- 2015, 2022

NCAA tournament Quarterfinals
- 2015, 2022

NCAA tournament Round of 16
- 2012, 2014, 2015, 2016, 2022

NCAA tournament appearances
- 1984, 2012, 2014, 2015, 2016, 2018, 2019, 2022, 2023, 2025

Conference tournament championships
- 1982, 1985, 2015, 2022

Syracuse Orange is the college soccer team for Syracuse University in Syracuse, New York. They are an NCAA Division I team in the Atlantic Coast Conference.

Syracuse is currently coached by Ian McIntyre who has brought the team to the National Championship, two NCAA Tournament College Cup, and two ACC Conference Titles in 2015 and 2022. McIntyre was named the National College Coach of the Year in 2022, the ACC Coach of the Year in 2014 and 2022, and the Big East Coach of the Year in 2012.

The Orange won the National Championship in the 2022 NCAA Division I men's soccer tournament, defeating eight time NCAA Champions Indiana 7–6 on Penalty Kicks.

== History ==
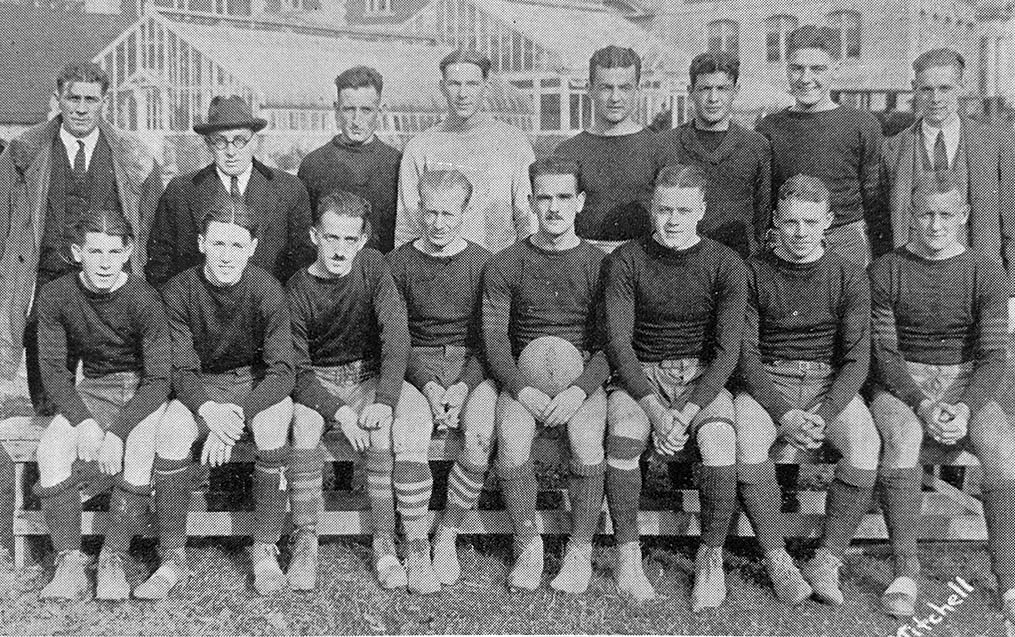
Syracuse Orangemen Soccer team in 1922

Syracuse fielded its first varsity soccer team in 1920. The program rose to national prominence early in its history, being recognized by the Intercollegiate Soccer Football Association as national champions for 1936. Syracuse competed with the other northeastern soccer programs as an independent until 1979.

The university was a founding member of the Big East Conference in 1979 and the Orange broke new ground in 1982 when they finished with a record of 17-3-2 and won the inaugural BIG EAST Tournament by beating Boston College in the final. On July 1, 2013, Syracuse joined the Atlantic Coast Conference (ACC).

== Players ==
=== Current roster ===
As of 12 Sep 2024

Note: Flags indicate national team as defined under FIFA eligibility rules; some limited exceptions apply. Players may hold more than one non-FIFA nationality.

No.	Pos.	Nation	Player
1	GK	USA	Kyle Jansen
2	DF	CAN	Chimere Omeze
5	DF	CAN	Dominic Bell
6	MF		Ivan Irinimbabazi
7	MF	USA	Nathan Scott
8	MF	USA	Jackson Miller
11	MF	CRC	Bryson Rodriguez
19	MF	USA	Badr Laghjibi
21	MF	USA	Landon Darko
22	MF	MOZ	Kelvin Da Costa
24	MF	BER	Sachiel Ming
25	GK	USA	Grayson Lamb
26	MF	CAN	Kristjan Fortier
27	DF	USA	Garrett Holman
29	MF	USA	Quinn Olcott
40	GK	USA	Juan Martinez-Bastidas

=== Orange in the MLS ===
==== MLS Draft History ====
*	Denotes player who has been selected for an MLS Best XI team or/and an MLS All-Star Game

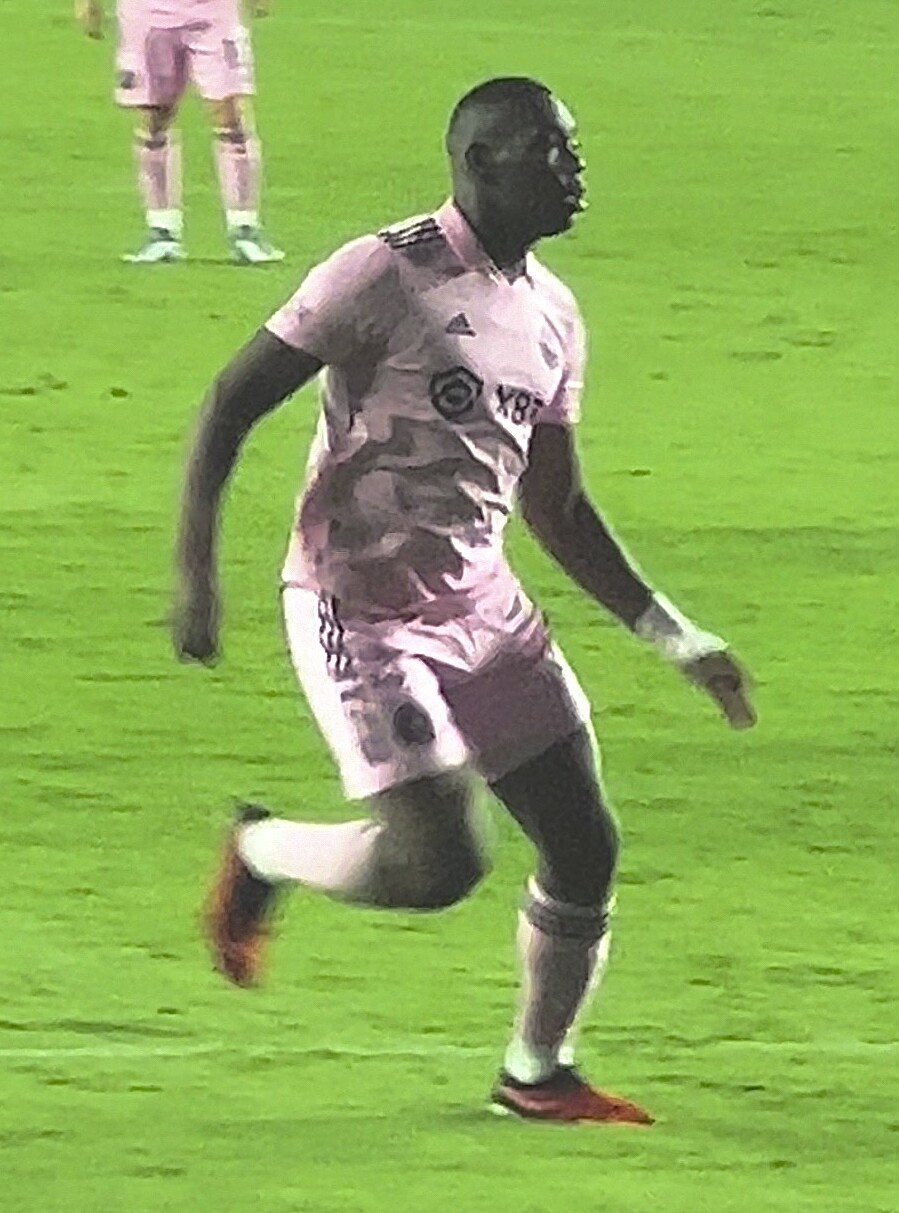
Kamal Miller with Inter Miami in 2023

Year	Player	Team	Pick
1996	(United States) Eric Puls	Colorado Rapids	12th round (112th overall)
1996	(Jamaica) Paul Young	Columbus Crew	13th round (121st overall)
1997	(United States) Mike Britton	Colorado Rapids	3rd round (23rd overall)
2004	(United States) Chris Aloisi	LA Galaxy	6th round (57th overall)
2006	(Jamaica) Ezra Prendergast	Chicago Fire FC	3rd round (34th overall)
2007	(Ghana) Richard Asante	Toronto FC	3rd round (27th overall)
2009	(Canada) Kyle Hall	Toronto FC	3rd round (39th overall)
2015	(United States) Alex Bono	Toronto FC	1st round (6th overall)
2015	(Canada) Skylar Thomas	Toronto FC	1st round (11th overall)
2015	(Canada) Jordan Murrell	Real Salt Lake	3rd round (57th overall)
2016	(Germany) Julian Büscher	D.C. United	1st round (11th overall)
2016	(United States) Ben Polk	Portland Timbers	1st round (20th overall)
2017	(United States) Miles Robinson	Atlanta United FC	1st round (2nd overall)
2017	(United States) Liam Callahan	Colorado Rapids	2nd round (24th overall)
2018	(England) Mo Adams	Chicago Fire	1st round (10thoverall)
2019	(Canada) Tajon Buchanan	New England Revolution	1st round (9th overall)
2019	(Canada) Kamal Miller	Orlando City SC	2nd round (27th overall)
2020	(Canada) Ryan Raposo	Vancouver Whitecaps FC	1st round (4th overall)
2020	(Canada) Nyal Higgins	Toronto FC	1st round (19th overall)
2021	(Guadeloupe) Luther Archimède	New York Red Bulls	1st round (13th overall)
2021	(Norway) Sondre Norheim	Nashville SC	3rd round (73rd overall)
2023	(United States) Abdi Salim	Orlando City	1st round (17th overall)
2023	(Canada) Levonte Johnson	Vancouver Whitecaps	1st round (29th overall)
2023	(Costa Rica) Amferny Sinclair	Real Salt Lake	2nd round (45th overall)
2023	(United States) Russell Shealy	LA Galaxy	2nd round (52nd overall)
2023	(Sweden) Buster Sjöberg	Vancouver Whitecaps	2nd round (71st overall)
2024	(United States) Jeorgio Kocevski	Orlando City	1st round (21st overall)
2024	(Canada) Olu Oyegunle	Chicago Fire	2nd round (33rd overall)

=== Generation Adidas Players ===
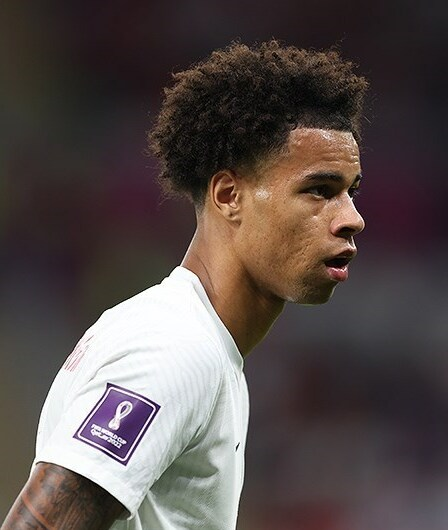
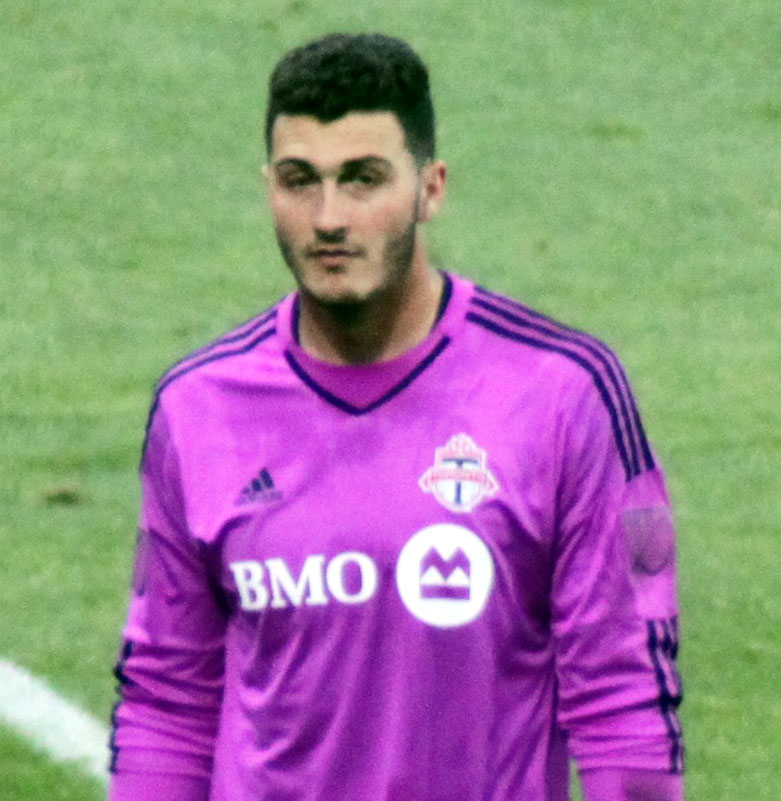
Tajon Buchanan (left) and Alex Bono, two of the Generation Adidas Syracuse players

Name	Age	Pos.	Hometown
(United States) Alex Bono	20	GK	Syracuse, NY
(Germany) Julian Büscher	22	M	Dülmen, Germany
(United States) Miles Robinson	19	D	Arlington, MA
(England) Mo Adams	21	M	Nottingham, England
(Canada) Tajon Buchanan	19	F	Brampton, ON
(Canada) Ryan Raposo	19	M	Hamilton, ON

=== MAC Hermann Trophy ===
Name	Pos.	Year	Place
Alex Bono	GK	2014	Finalist
Levonte Johnson	F	2022	Finalist

=== All-Americans ===
Name	Year	Team
John McEwan	1932	1st
Vincent Black	1932	1st
Vincent Black	1933	1st
Bill Nelson	1952	1st
Joe Papaleo	1982	3rd
Paul Young	1992	2nd
Alex Bono	2014	1st
Julian Buescher	2015	2nd
Miles Robinson	2016	1st
Nathan Opoku	2022	3rd
Levonte Johnson	2022	1st
Jeorgio Kocevski	2023	3rd

=== The 30-Goal Club ===
Player	Goals	Tenure
Marcello Vitale	44	1979–1982
Steve Morris	43	1986, 1988 – 1990
Mark DiMonte	42	1984–1987
Greg Kolodziey	35	1983–1986
Paul Young	32	1990–1992
Kirk Johnson	30	2000–2003

=== Current professionals ===
As of February 27, 2025

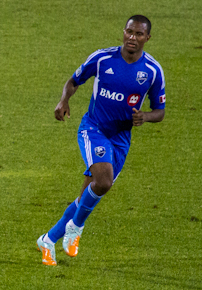
Patrice Bernier with CF Montréal

- (Scotland) Steve Morris (1986–1990) – Currently head coach of Bavarian United SC
- (United States) Alex Bono (2012–2014) – Currently with New England Revolution
- Miles Robinson (2015–2016) – Currently with FC Cincinnati and United States men's national soccer team international
- Kamal Miller (2015–2018) – Currently with Portland Timbers and Canada international
- (Colombia) Sergio Camargo (2016) – Currently with Cavalry FC
- (Eritrea) Mo Adams (2016–2017) – Currently with Al Batin FC
- (Sweden) Hampus Bergdahl (2016–2017) – Currently with Team TG FF
- Tajon Buchanan (2017–2018) – Currently with Inter Milan and Canada international
- (Canada) Simon Triantafillou (2017–2020) – Currently with Burlington SC
- (Canada) Nathaniel St. Louis (2018) – Currently with Simcoe County Rovers FC
- (Canada) Massimo Ferrin (2018–2019) – Currently with York United FC
- (Canada) Ryan Raposo (2018–2019) – Currently with LAFC
- (Canada) Nyal Higgins (2019) – Currently with York United FC
- (Hong Kong) Matt Orr (2019) – Currently with Shenzhen Peng City F.C.
- Luther Archimède (2019–2020) – Currently with Monterey Bay FC and Guadeloupe international
- (Canada) Deandre Kerr (2020–2021) – Currently with Toronto FC
- Abdi Salim (2020–2022) – Currently with Somalia international
- (United States) Russell Shealy (2020–2022) – Currently with Union Omaha
- (United States) Luke Biasi (2021) – Currently with Pittsburgh Riverhounds SC
- (Canada) Oluwaseun Oyegunle (2021–2023) – Currently with Chicago Fire FC II
- (Canada) Levonte Johnson (2022) – Currently with Colorado Springs Switchbacks FC
- (Ghana) Nathan Opoku (2022) – Currently with Leicester City F.C.
- (Canada) Joshua Belluz (2023) – Currently with Colorado Rapids 2
- (Canada) Nathaniel Edwards (2023) – Currently with Toronto FC
- (Canada) Gabriel Mikina (2023) – Currently with St. Louis City 2
- (United States) Jason Smith (2023–2024) - Currently with Chattanooga Red Wolves

== Honours ==
=== National ===
- NCAA Division I tournament (1): 2022

=== Conference ===
- Atlantic Coast Conference (2): 2015, 2022
- Big East Conference (2): 1982, 1985

== Tournament details ==
=== 2022 College Cup ===
2022 NCAA soccer season was the most successful in the history of the Orange program. Syracuse achieved a Treble by winning ACC Conference regular season, ACC Conference tournament, and NCAA National Championships.

Semifinals; WakeMed Soccer Park; Cary, North Carolina
Pittsburgh	0
13	Indiana	2
3	Syracuse	3
Creighton	2

Championship; WakeMed Soccer Park; Cary, North Carolina
3	Syracuse	2 (7)
13	Indiana	2 (6)

=== 2015 College Cup ===
Semifinals; Children's Mercy Park; Kansas City, Kansas
8	Stanford (pen.)	0(8)
4	Akron	0(7)
6	Syracuse	0(1)
2	Clemson (pen.)	0(4)

Championship; Children's Mercy Park; Kansas City, Kansas
8	Stanford	4
2	Clemson	0

=== 2022 ACC Conference Champions ===
First Round; ACCN & ACCNX
8	Clemson	3
9	Notre Dame	1
5	Louisville	1
12	Virginia Tech	2
6	Pittsburgh (a.e.t.)	4
11	NC State	1
7	North Carolina	1
10	Boston College	0

Quarterfinals; ACCN
1	Duke	0
8	Clemson	2
4	Wake Forest	1
12	Virginia Tech	0
3	Virginia	1
6	Pittsburgh	0
2	Syracuse	1
7	North Carolina	0

Semifinals; ACCN
8	Clemson	2
4	Wake Forest	0
3	Virginia	2 (3)
2	Syracuse (pen.)	2 (5)

Final; ESPNU
8	Clemson	0
2	Syracuse	2

=== 2015 ACC Conference Champions ===
Preliminary Round
8	Duke	1
9	Louisville	2
7	Syracuse	2
10	NC State	0

Quarterfinals
1	Wake Forest (OT)	2
9	Louisville	1
4	Notre Dame	1
5	Virginia	0
3	Clemson	3
6	Boston College	0
2	North Carolina	1 (3)
7	Syracuse (pen.)	1 (4)

Semifinals
1	Wake Forest	0
4	Notre Dame	1
3	Clemson	0
7	Syracuse	2

Championship
4	Notre Dame	0
7	Syracuse	1

=== Big East Conference Champions ===
The Orange soccer program competed in the Big East Conference since its first season of existence until the Orange joined to play in the Atlantic Coast Conference in 2013.

1982 Big East Conference Tournament
Round	Opponent	Score
Semifinal	St. John's	3–2
Final	Boston College	1–0

1985 Big East Conference Tournament
Round	Opponent	Score
Semifinal	Pittsburgh	2–0
Final	Connecticut	1–0

== Footnotes ==
1. A: Co-champions with Penn State, Princeton and West Chester.
1. "Dean Foti has accumulated more wins than any other Orange soccer coach". suathletics.com/. Archived from the original on October 12, 2007.
2. "Chris Aloisi's success after Syracuse". suathletics.com/. Archived from the original on October 12, 2007.
3. "Richard Asante's success after Syracuse". suathletics.com/. Archived from the original on October 12, 2007.
4. "Syracuse's drafted players". suathletics.com/. Archived from the original on October 12, 2007.
5. "Syracuse's 2007 roster". suathletics.com/. Archived from the original on August 18, 2007.
6. "2007 Men's Soccer standings for the Big East Conference of the NCAA". bigeast.org/. Archived from the original on February 4, 2009.
7. "SU Soccer History". suathletics.com/.
8. "SU Pros". suathletics.com/. Archived from the original on June 27, 2006.
9. "History and Record Book". suathletics.com/. Archived from the original on June 27, 2006.
