= 2025 Big Ten Conference men's soccer season =

2025 Big Ten Conference men' soccer season
- League: NCAA Division I
- Sport: Soccer
- Duration: August 21 - December 15, 2025
- Teams: 11
- TV partner(s): Fox Sports (Fox/FS2, BTN)

2026 MLS SuperDraft
- Top draft pick: Richie Aman
- Picked by: D.C. United, 8th overall

Regular season
- Champions: Maryland
- Season MVP: FW: Palmer Ault; MF: Richie Aman; DF: Lasse Kelp; GK: Laurin Mack
- Top scorer: Palmer Ault (16)

Tournament
- Champions: UCLA
- Runners-up: Michigan
- Finals MVP: Sergi Solans Ormo

Men's Soccer seasons
- 2024 2026

2025 Big Ten Conference men's soccer standings
	Conf.						Overall
Team	W		L		T	PCT	W		L		T	PCT
No. 7 Maryland ‍†‍‍^{y}	8	–	0	–	2	.900	13	–	2	–	4	.789
No. 1 Washington ‍‍‍^{y}	7	–	3	–	0	.700	16	–	6	–	2	.708
Michigan ‍‍‍^{y}	6	–	2	–	3	.682	12	–	4	–	4	.700
UCLA ‍‍‡‍^{y}	5	–	3	–	2	.600	8	–	6	–	5	.553
No. 22 Indiana ‍‍‍^{y}	5	–	5	–	0	.500	12	–	6	–	1	.658
Wisconsin ‍‍‍	4	–	6	–	0	.400	8	–	8	–	0	.500
Northwestern ‍‍‍	3	–	5	–	2	.400	8	–	6	–	3	.559
Rutgers ‍‍‍	3	–	5	–	2	.400	8	–	6	–	3	.559
Ohio State ‍‍‍	3	–	7	–	0	.300	6	–	10	–	0	.375
Michigan State ‍‍‍	2	–	5	–	3	.350	5	–	8	–	3	.406
Penn State ‍‍‍	1	–	6	–	3	.250	5	–	8	–	4	.412
† – Conference champion ‡ – 2025 B1G tournament champion y – Invited to the 2025 NCAA Tournament; As of May 2, 2026; Rankings from United Soccer Coaches; Source: Big Ten

The 2025 Big Ten Conference men's soccer season was the 34th season of college soccer play for the Big Ten Conference and part of the 2025 NCAA Division I men's soccer season.

Indiana and Ohio State were the defending regular season co-champions, while Ohio State was the defending Big East Conference men's soccer tournament champion.

The regular season for the 2025 season was won by Maryland, who won their 26th-ever regular season conference championship, and their fifth-ever Big Ten regular season title. UCLA went on to win the 2025 Big Ten Conference men's soccer tournament, making it UCLA's first-ever Big Ten tournament title for men's soccer.

Big Ten regular season runners-up, Washington won the 2025 NCAA Division I men's soccer championship game, giving Washington their first ever men's soccer national title.

== Previous season ==
Rutgers won the Big Ten men's soccer tournament for the first time in program history, and won their first conference tournament championship since 1997. Maryland won their first Big Ten Conference regular season championship since 2016. MD Myers of Rutgers won both the regular season and tournament Player of the Year award.

In the 2022 NCAA Division I men's soccer tournament, four Big Ten teams received bids into the tournament. Rutgers earned the automatic bid, while Maryland, Ohio State, and Indiana received at-large bids. Maryland and Ohio State reached the second round of the tournament before being eliminated, while Rutgers was eliminated in the first round. Indiana reached their NCAA-record 17th NCAA National Championship game, but lost in penalty kicks to Syracuse in the final.

In the 2023 MLS SuperDraft, Maryland sophomore, Joshua Bolma, was the first Big Ten player to be drafted, selected fourth overall by the New England Revolution.

== Teams ==
=== Stadiums and locations ===
Team	Location	Stadium	Capacity
Indiana	Bloomington, Indiana	Bill Armstrong Stadium	6,500
Maryland	College Park, Maryland	Ludwig Field	7,000
Michigan	Ann Arbor, Michigan	U-M Soccer Stadium	2,200
Michigan State	Lansing, Michigan	DeMartin Soccer Complex	2,500
Northwestern	Evanston, Illinois	Lanny and Sharon Martin Stadium	3,000
Ohio State	Columbus, Ohio	Jesse Owens Memorial Stadium	10,000
Penn State	State College, Pennsylvania	Jeffrey Field	5,000
Rutgers	Piscataway, New Jersey	Yurcak Field	5,000
UCLA	Los Angeles, California	Wallis Annenberg Stadium	2,145
Washington	Seattle, Washington	Husky Soccer Stadium	3,250
Wisconsin	Madison, Wisconsin	Don McClimon Stadium	2,000

== Head coaches ==
Team	Head coach	Previous job	Years at school	Overall record	Big Ten record	Big Ten titles	Big Ten tournament titles	NCAA tournaments	NCAA College Cups	NCAA Championships
Indiana	Todd Yeagley	Wisconsin	16	211–79–59 (.689)	204–70–57 (.702)	5	5	16	4	1
Maryland	Sasho Cirovski	Hartford	32	438–179–72 (.688)	128–76–36 (.608)	3	3	29	9	3
Michigan	Chaka Daley	Providence	14	247–228–83 (.517)	52–52–28 (.500)	1	0	4	0	0
Michigan State	Damon Rensing	Michigan State (Asst.)	18	148–112–49 (.558)	50–49–23 (.504)	0	1	8	1	0
Northwestern	Russell Payne	Army	5	0–0–0 (–)	0–0–0 (–)	0	0	0	0	0
Ohio State	Brian Maisonneuve	Indiana (Asst.)	8	0–0–0 (–)	0–0–0 (–)	0	0	0	0	0
Penn State	Jeff Cook	Bethlehem Steel	8	0–0–0 (–)	0–0–0 (–)	0	0	0	0	0
Rutgers	Jim McElderry	Fordham	7	0–0–0 (–)	0–0–0 (–)	0	0	0	0	0
UCLA	Ryan Jorden	Pacific	7	0–0–0 (–)	0–0–0 (–)	0	0	0	0	0
Washington	Jamie Clark	Creighton	15	0–0–0 (–)	0–0–0 (–)	0	0	0	0	0
Wisconsin	Neil Jones	Loyola Chicago	4	0–0–0 (–)	0–0–0 (–)	0	0	0	0	0

Notes:

- All records, appearances, titles, etc. are from time with current school only.
- Year at school includes 2025 season.
- Overall and Big Ten records are from time at current school only and are through the beginning of the season.

=== Coaching changes ===
There were no head coaching changes during the 2024–25 offseason.

== Preseason ==
=== Recruiting classes ===
Rankings
Team	TopDrawer Soccer	Prep Soccer	Signees
Indiana	8	24	4
Maryland	3	5	6
Michigan	30	16	8
Michigan State	16	15	8
Northwestern	46	41	7
Ohio State	9	9	8
Penn State	33	35	6
Rutgers	30	40	7
UCLA	1	2	17
Washington	17	21	7
Wisconsin	20	17	9

Note: College Soccer News did not release a recruiting rankings for the 2025 season.

=== Preseason poll ===
Big Ten preseason poll
Predicted finish	Team
1	Indiana
2	Maryland
3	Ohio State
4	UCLA
5	Washington
6	Michigan
7	Michigan State
8	Wisconsin
9	Rutgers
10	Penn State
11	Northwestern

=== Preseason national polls ===
	United; Soccer	CSN	Top Drawer; Soccer
Indiana	11	12	18
Maryland			
Michigan			
Michigan State			
Northwestern			
Ohio State	3	9	4
Penn State			
Rutgers			
UCLA		24	
Washington		25	
Wisconsin			

=== Preseason players to watch ===
Defensive Players to Watch
Player	Nat.	Position	Class	Team
Egor Akulov	RUS	DF	Sr.	Washington
Drew Brown	USA	DF	Sr.	UCLA
Nick Collins	USA	DF	Jr.	Rutgers
Luca Costabile	DEN	DF	Sr.	Maryland
Ciaran Dalton	USA	GK	Sr.	Rutgers
Matisse Hébert	CAN	GK	So.	Wisconsin
Ellis Jones	USA	DF	Jr.	Wisconsin
Zac Kelly	USA	GK	Sr.	Michigan State
Josh Maher	USA	DF	So.	Indiana
Nolan Miller	USA	DF	Sr.	Michigan
Brandon Munson	USA	DF	So.	Michigan State
Nigel Prince	JAM	DF	Sr.	Northwestern
Fritz Volmar	USA	DF	Jr.	Northwestern

Midfielders to Watch
Player	Nat.	Class	Team
Malick Daouda	CAN	So.	Penn State
Leon Koehl	GER	Jr.	Maryland
Jason Gajadhar	TRI	Sr.	Northwestern
Thomas Gilej	GER	Jr.	Ohio State
Caden Grabfelder	USA	Jr.	Penn State
Miles Merritt	USA	Jr.	Michigan State
Collins Oduro	GHA	Jr.	Indiana
Luciano Pechota	USA	Sr.	Ohio State
Tamir Ratoviz	ISR	So.	UCLA
Joschi Schelb	GER	Jr.	Rutgers
Matthew Zachemski	POL	So.	Wisconsin

Forwards to Watch
Player	Nat.	Class	Team
Richie Aman	USA	Sr.	Washington
Palmer Ault	USA	Sr.	Indiana
Marko Borkovic	CRO	Sr.	Ohio State
Charlie Kosakoff	USA	Jr.	Washington
Sadam Masereka	UGA	Sr.	Maryland
Raymundo Mendez	USA	Gr.	Michigan
Kai Phillip	TRI	Gr.	Penn State
Shuma Sasaki	JPN	Gr.	Michigan
Sergi Solans Ormo	ESP	So.	UCLA

=== Hermann Trophy ===
The Hermann Trophy preseason watchlist was released on August 21, 2025. Three Big Ten players were selected the preseason watchlist.

Player	Class	Position	School
Palmer Ault	Sr.	FW	Indiana
Luciano Pechota	Sr.	MF	Ohio State
Sergi Solans Ormo	So.	MF	UCLA

== Regular season ==
Home team listed second, Big Ten team listed in bold.

Index to colors and formatting
B1G member won
B1G member lost
B1G member tied
B1G teams in **bold**

=== Week 1 (Aug. 19 – Aug. 25) ===
Date	Time	Visiting team	Home team	Site	TV	Result	Attendance	Ref.
August 21	7:00 p.m.	Stetson	**Penn State**	Jeffrey Field • University Park, PA	B1G+	**W** 2–0	622	
August 21	7:00 p.m.	UC Riverside	**Michigan State**	DeMartin Stadium • East Lansing, MI	B1G+	**W** 2–0	4,025	
August 21	7:00 p.m.	No. 9 Clemson	No. 11 **Indiana**	Bill Armstrong Stadium • Bloomington, IN	FS2	**T** 2–2	6,395	
August 21	7:00 p.m.	Providence	**Rutgers**	Yurcak Field • Piscataway, NJ	B1G+	**W** 1–0	737	
August 21	7:00 p.m.	Notre Dame	**Michigan**	U-M Soccer Stadium • Ann Arbor, MI	B1G+	**T** 1–1	1,400	
August 21	7:15 p.m.	No. 3 **Ohio State**	Virginia Tech	Thompson Field • Blacksburg, VA	ACCN	**L** 0–1	1,532	
August 21	8:00 p.m.	Eastern Illinois	**Northwestern**	Martin Stadium • Evanston, IL		**W** 2–0	268	
August 21	8:00 p.m.	**Maryland**	No. 6 Wake Forest	Spry Stadium • Winston-Salem, NC	ESPNU	1–0 (Note: The Maryland–Wake Forest match was cancelled at halftime due to lightning. Maryland was leading, 1–0, at the end of the half.)		
August 21	8:30 p.m.	North Florida	**Wisconsin**	McClimon Memorial Stadium • Madison, WI		**L** 0–1	635	
August 21	9:00 p.m.	**Washington**	No. 4 Denver	CIBER Field • Denver, CO		**L** 0–2	579	
August 21	10:00 p.m.	**UCLA**	UC Irvine	Anteater Stadium • Irvine, CA		**L** 0–2	1,734	
August 24	2:00 p.m.	UC Riverside	**Michigan**	U-M Soccer Stadium • Ann Arbor, MI	B1G+	**W** 2–0	582	
August 24	2:00 p.m.	Air Force	**Northwestern**	Martin Stadium • Evanston, IL	B1G+	**W** 2–1	298	
August 24	2:00 p.m.	Bradley	**Wisconsin**	McClimon Memorial Stadium • Madison, WI	B1G+	**W** 4–1	526	
August 24	6:00 p.m.	**Penn State**	Army	Malek Stadium • West Point, NY	ESPN+	**L** 1–2	1,194	
August 24	7:30 p.m.	San Francisco	No. 11 **Indiana**	Bill Armstrong Stadium • Bloomington, IN	B1G+	**W** 3–2	2,404	
August 24	7:30 p.m.	**Rutgers**	Seton Hall	Owen T. Carroll Field • South Orange, NJ	BEDN	**T** 2–2	967	
August 24	10:30 p.m.	California	**UCLA**	Wallis Annenberg Stadium • Los Angeles, CA	FS2	**L** 0–1	1,206	
August 24	10:30 p.m.	**Washington**	No. 14 Oregon State	Paul Lorenz Field • Corvallis, OR	P12N	**L** 1–2	494	
August 25	7:00 p.m.	**Michigan State**	No. 7 Pitt	Ambrose Urbanic Field • Pittsburgh, PA	ACCNX	**L** 2–3	986	
August 25	7:00 p.m.	**Maryland**	No. 25 Georgetown	Shaw Field • Washington, DC	BEDN	**W** 1–0	1,863	
^{#}Rankings from U. Soccer Coaches Poll. All times are in Eastern Time.

=== Week 2 (Aug. 26 – Sep. 1) ===
Date	Time	Visiting team	Home team	Site	TV	Result	Attendance	Ref.
August 28	7:00 p.m.	**Penn State**	Syracuse	SU Soccer Stadium • Syracuse, NY	ACCNX	**T** 1–1	1,716	
August 28	7:00 p.m.	Oakland	No. 17 **Ohio State**	Jesse Owens Memorial Stadium • Columbus, OH (Wolstein Classic)	B1G+	**W** 1–0	1,054	
August 28	8:00 p.m.	Green Bay	No. 7 **Indiana**	Bill Armstrong Stadium • Bloomington, IN (adidas/IU Credit Union Classic)	B1G+	**W** 2–1	2,438	
August 28	10:00 p.m.	Cal State Fullerton	**UCLA**	Wallis Annenberg Stadium • Los Angeles, CA	B1G+	**T** 1–1	578	
August 28	10:30 p.m.	UC Davis	**Washington**	Husky Soccer Stadium • Seattle, WA	B1G+	**T** 1–1	1,703	
August 29	7:00 p.m.	**Rutgers**	James Madison	Sentara Park • Harrisonburg, VA	ESPN+	**W** 4–1	382	
August 29	7:00 p.m.	Western Michigan	**Wisconsin**	McClimon Memorial Stadium • Madison, WI	B1G+	**W** 1–0	460	
August 29	7:00 p.m.	Creighton	**Michigan**	U-M Soccer Stadium • Ann Arbor, MI	B1G+	**W** 3–1	1,482	
August 29	7:30 p.m.	Bucknell	**Maryland**	Ludwig Field • College Park, MD	B1G+	**T** 2–2	5,085	
August 29	7:30 p.m.	Loyola Chicago	**Northwestern**	Martin Stadium • Evanston, IL	B1G+	**T** 1–1	438	
August 31	7:00 p.m.	Temple	No. 17 **Ohio State**	Jesse Owens Memorial Stadium • Columbus, OH (Wolstein Classic)	B1G+	**W** 2–1	1,763	
August 31	8:00 p.m.	No. 14 Oregon State	No. 7 **Indiana**	Bill Armstrong Stadium • Bloomington, IN (adidas/IU Credit Union Classic)	BTN	**W** 2–0	3,516	
August 31	10:30 p.m.	UNLV	**Washington**	Husky Soccer Stadium • Seattle, WA	B1G+	**W** 4–0	1,042	
September 1	1:00 p.m.	**UCLA**	No. 18 Kentucky	Bell Soccer Complex • Lexington, KY	SECN+/ESPN+	**T** 0–0	1,894	
September 1	2:00 p.m.	Bowling Green	**Michigan**	U-M Soccer Stadium • Ann Arbor, MI	B1G+	**W** 1–0	1,795	
September 1	2:00 p.m.	Detroit Mercy	**Michigan State**	DeMartin Stadium • East Lansing, MI	B1G+	**W** 1–0	2,395	
September 1	4:00 p.m.	No. 23 Missouri State	**Penn State**	Jeffrey Field • University Park, PA	B1G+	**L** 1–3	1,510	
September 1	6:00 p.m.	**Rutgers**	William & Mary	Albert–Daly Field • Williamsburg, VA	FloSports	**W** 4–1	378	
September 1	7:00 p.m.	Saint Francis (PA)	**Maryland**	Ludwig Field • College Park, MD	B1G+	**W** 6–0	2,245	
September 1	7:30 p.m.	UIC	**Northwestern**	Martin Stadium • Evanston, IL	B1G+	**L** 2–3	424	
September 1	8:00 p.m.	No. 24 Portland	**Wisconsin**	McClimon Memorial Stadium • Madison, WI	B1G+	**L** 0–1	456	
^{#}Rankings from U. Soccer Coaches Poll. All times are in Eastern Time.

=== Week 3 (Sep. 2 – Sep. 8) ===
Date	Time	Visiting team	Home team	Site	TV	Result	Attendance	Ref.
September 3	8:00 p.m.	No. 15 Saint Louis	No. 4 **Indiana**	Bill Armstrong Stadium • Bloomington, IN	B1G+	**W** 1–0	2,746	
September 4	10:30 p.m.	**Washington**	Loyola Marymount	Sullivan Field • Los Angeles, CA	ESPN+	**T** 2–2	488	
September 5	7:00 p.m.	**Michigan**	Oakland	Oakland Soccer Field • Rochester Hills, MI	ESPN+	**T** 2–2	1,139	
September 5	7:00 p.m.	**Michigan State**	Bowling Green	Mickey Cochrane Stadium • Bowling Green, OH	MACDN	**L** 0–1	963	
September 5	7:00 p.m.	No. 16 **Ohio State**	No. 11 Akron	FirstEnergy Stadium • Akron, OH	ESPN+	**L** 0–2	2,477	
September 5	7:00 p.m.	Mercyhurst	**Penn State**	Jeffrey Field • University Park, PA	B1G+	**W** 5–0	952	
September 5	7:00 p.m.	**Rutgers**	Princeton	Roberts Stadium • Princeton, NJ (Rivalry)	ESPN+	**L** 1–3	1,036	
September 6	12:00 p.m.	Pacific	**Maryland**	Ludwig Field • College Park, MD	B1G+	**W** 4–0	1,013	
September 6	7:30 p.m.	**Northwestern**	Xavier	Corcoran Field • Cincinnati, OH	ESPN+	**W** 1–0	217	
September 6	8:00 p.m.	**Wisconsin**	Marquette	Valley Fields • Milwaukee, WI (I–94 derby)	ESPN+	Canceled		
September 7	7:00 p.m.	**UCLA**	Loyola Marymount	Sullivan Field • Los Angeles, CA	ESPN+	**L** 1–2	642	
September 7	7:30 p.m.	No. 4 **Indiana**	Notre Dame	Alumni Stadium • South Bend, IN (Rivalry)	ACCN	**W** 1–0	1,883	
September 8	7:00 p.m.	Oakland	**Michigan State**	DeMartin Stadium • East Lansing, MI	B1G+	**W** 3–2	1,023	
September 8	10:30 p.m.	**Washington**	Seattle U	Championship Field • Seattle, WA (Fewing Cup)	ESPN+	**W** 7–2	1,348	
^{#}Rankings from U. Soccer Coaches Poll. All times are in Eastern Time.

=== Week 4 (Sep. 9 – Sep. 15) ===
Date	Time	Visiting team	Home team	Site	TV	Result	Attendance	Ref.
September 9	7:00 p.m.	No. 6 Louisville	**Ohio State**	Jesse Owens Memorial Stadium • Columbus, OH	B1G+	**L** 0–1	940	
September 12	7:00 p.m.	No. 20 **Maryland**	**Wisconsin**	Don McClimon Stadium • Madison, WI	B1G+	**UMD** 3–1	677	
September 12	7:00 p.m.	**Penn State**	**Rutgers**	Yurcak Field • Piscataway, NJ	B1G+	**RUT** 1–0	782	
September 12	10:00 p.m.	**Northwestern**	**UCLA**	Wallis Annenberg Stadium • Los Angeles, CA	B1G+	**UCLA** 1–0	574	
September 12	10:30 p.m.	**Michigan State**	**Washington**	Husky Soccer Stadium • Seattle, WA	B1G+	**UW** 2–1	1,958	
September 13	7:00 p.m.	**Ohio State**	Butler	Sellick Bowl • Indianpolis, IN (Crossroads Derby)		**W** 4–0	1,167	
September 13	8:00 p.m.	No. 25 **Michigan**	No. 1 **Indiana**	Bill Armstrong Stadium • Bloomington, IN	B1G+	**UM** 3–2	4,562	
September 15	2:00 p.m.	**Northwestern**	UC Riverside	UC Riverside Soccer Stadium • Riverside, CA	ESPN+	**W** 3–2	101	
^{#}Rankings from U. Soccer Coaches Poll. All times are in Eastern Time.

=== Week 5 (Sep. 16 – Sep. 22) ===
Date	Time	Visiting team	Home team	Site	TV	Result	Attendance	Ref.
September 16	10:00 p.m.	Gonzaga	Washington	Husky Soccer Stadium • Seattle, WA (Rivalry)	B1G+	**W** 6–0	1,631	
September 19	7:00 p.m.	**Indiana**	Penn State	Jeffrey Field • University Park, PA	B1G+	**IU** 4–1	1,577	
September 19	7:00 p.m.	Pittsburgh	Maryland	Ludwig Field • College Park, MD	BTN	**W** 2–1	2,754	
September 19	7:00 p.m.	**Ohio State**	Michigan State	DeMartin Stadium • East Lansing, MI	B1G+	**OSU** 3–2	2,218	
September 19	7:30 p.m.	**Rutgers**	Northwestern	Martin Stadium • Evanston, IL	B1G+	**NU** 2–1	1,027	
September 19	10:00 p.m.	**Wisconsin**	UCLA	Wallis Annenberg Stadium • Los Angeles, CA	BTN	**UCLA** 3–1	1,259	
September 20	10:00 p.m.	**Michigan**	Washington	Husky Soccer Stadium • Seattle, WA	B1G+	**UM** 1–0	2,781	
^{#}Rankings from U. Soccer Coaches Poll. All times are in Eastern Time.

=== Week 6 (Sep. 23 – Sep. 29) ===
Date	Time	Visiting team	Home team	Site	TV	Result	Attendance	Ref.
September 23	6:00 p.m.	No. 3 **Indiana**	**Michigan State**	Bill Armstrong Stadium • Bloomington, IN (Old Brass Derby)	BTN	**MSU** 1–0	1,030	
September 23	7:00 p.m.	Fairleigh Dickinson	**Rutgers**	Yurcak Field • Piscataway, NJ	B1G+	**W** 3–2	483	
September 23	8:00 p.m.	No. 23 **Maryland**	**Penn State**	Jeffrey Field • University Park, PA	BTN	**T** 2–2	744	
September 26	6:00 p.m.	**Michigan State**	No. 5 **Michigan**	U-M Soccer Stadium • Ann Arbor, MI (Big Bear Trophy)	BTN	**MSU** 2–1	2,341	
September 26	7:00 p.m.	**Northwestern**	No. 23 **Maryland**	Ludwig Field • College Park, MD	B1G+	**UMD** 4–1	3,017	
September 26	7:00 p.m.	**Ohio State**	**Rutgers**	Yurcak Field • Piscataway, NJ	B1G+	**RUT** 2–0	854	
September 26	7:30 p.m.	**UCLA**	No. 3 **Indiana**	Bill Armstrong Stadium • Bloomington, IN	BTN	**IU** 4–2	3,377	
September 26	8:00 p.m.	**Washington**	**Wisconsin**	Don McClimon Stadium • Madison, WI	B1G+	**UW** 2–0	464	
September 29	6:00 p.m.	**UCLA**	**Ohio State**	Jesse Owens Memorial Stadium • Columbus, OH	BTN	**OSU** 2–1	1,165	
September 29	7:30 p.m.	**Washington**	**Northwestern**	Martin Stadium • Evanston, IL	BTN	**UW** 1–0	458	
^{#}Rankings from U. Soccer Coaches Poll. All times are in Eastern Time.

=== Week 7 (Sep. 30 – Oct. 6) ===
Date	Time	Visiting team	Home team	Site	TV	Result	Attendance	Ref.
September 30	7:00 p.m.	Monmouth	**Rutgers**	Yurcak Field • Piscataway, NJ	B1G+	**W** 2–0	404	
September 30	7:00 p.m.	Robert Morris	**Penn State**	Jeffrey Field • University Park, PA	B1G+	**W** 2–0	475	
October 1	7:00 p.m.	Chicago State	No. 11 **Michigan**	U-M Soccer Stadium • Ann Arbor, MI	B1G+	**W** 6–0	382	
October 3	5:00 p.m.	**Penn State**	**Michigan State**	DeMartin Soccer Complex • East Lansing, MI	B1G+	**PSU** 2–1	4,861	
October 3	7:00 p.m.	**Wisconsin**	**Ohio State**	Jesse Owens Memorial Stadium • Columbus, OH	B1G+	**WIS** 1–0	1,771	
October 3	10:00 p.m.	No. 12 **Indiana**	**Washington**	Husky Soccer Stadium • Seattle, WA	BTN	**UW** 3–0	2,805	
October 3	10:00 p.m.	No. 18 **Maryland**	**UCLA**	Wallis Annenberg Stadium • Los Angeles, CA	BTN	**T** 0–0	1,021	
October 5	2:00 p.m.	**Rutgers**	No. 11 **Michigan**	U-M Soccer Stadium • Ann Arbor, MI	B1G+	**T** 0–0	1,921	
October 5	3:00 p.m.	King's (PA)	**Penn State**	Jeffrey Field • University Park, PA	B1G+	**W** 7–1	834	
^{#}Rankings from U. Soccer Coaches Poll. All times are in Eastern Time.

=== Week 8 (Oct. 7 – Oct. 13) ===
Date	Time	Visiting team	Home team	Site	TV	Result	Attendance	Ref.
October 7	7:30 p.m.	Evansville	**Northwestern**	Martin Field • Evanston, IL	B1G+	**W** 1–0	211	
October 7	8:00 p.m.	Milwaukee	**Wisconsin**	Dan McClimon Stadium • Madison, WI (Governor's Cup)	B1G+	**W** 2–1	408	
October 10	7:00 p.m.	**Wisconsin**	No. 18 **Rutgers**	Yurcak Field • Piscataway, NJ	B1G+	**RUT** 4–2	521	
October 10	7:30 p.m.	**Ohio State**	No. 20 **Indiana**	Bill Armstrong Stadium • Bloomington, IN	B1G+	**IU** 4–2	2,672	
October 10	7:30 p.m.	No. 13 **Michigan**	No. 15 **Maryland**	Ludwig Field • College Park, MD	B1G+	**UMD** 2–0	4,107	
October 10	10:00 p.m.	**Penn State**	**UCLA**	Wallis Annenberg Stadium • Los Angeles, CA	B1G+	**UCLA** 2–0	1,049	
October 11	7:30 p.m.	**Michigan State**	**Northwestern**	Martin Stadium • Evanston, IL	B1G+	**T** 0–0	732	
^{#}Rankings from U. Soccer Coaches Poll. All times are in Eastern Time.

== Rankings ==
=== National rankings ===
Legend
Increase in ranking
Decrease in ranking
Not ranked previous week

		Pre	Wk 1	Wk 2	Wk 3	Wk 4	Wk 5	Wk 6	Wk 7	Wk 8	Wk 9	Wk 10	Wk 11	Wk 12	Wk 13	Wk 14	Wk 15	Final
Indiana	USC	11	7	4 (2)	1 (8)	5 (1)	3	12	20	14	14	17	25т	24	Not released			22
Indiana	TDS	18	10	4	2	9	5	13	25	21	21	23	—	—	—	—	—	—
Indiana	CSN	12	9	5	2	3	4	5	11	13	12	13	19	17	Not released			16
Maryland	USC	RV	RV	—	RV	—	23	18	15	8	4	2	1 (8)	1 (8)	Not released			7
Maryland	TDS	—	—	—	—	25	24	17	19	12	4	1	1	1	7	4	2	5
Maryland	CSN	RV	25	20	17	12	9	6	9	8	7	4	2	1	Not released			4
Michigan	USC	RV	RV	25	RV	8	5	11	13	16	13	12	10	16	Not released			RV
Michigan	TDS	—	—	—	—	8	4	12	17	17	16	11	9	8	16	—	—	—
Michigan	CSN	RV	RV	RV	RV	20	7	10	14	17	18	17	13	16	Not released			19
Michigan State	USC	—	—	—	—	—	—	—	—	—	—	—	—	—	Not released			—
Michigan State	TDS	—	—	—	—	—	—	—	—	—	—	—	—	—	—	—	—	—
Michigan State	CSN	—	—	—	—	—	—	—	—	—	—	—	—	—	Not released			—
Northwestern	USC	—	—	—	—	—	—	—	—	—	—	—	—	—	Not released			—
Northwestern	TDS	—	—	—	—	—	—	—	—	—	—	—	—	—	—	—	—	—
Northwestern	CSN	—	—	—	—	—	—	—	—	—	—	—	—	—	Not released			—
Ohio State	USC	3	—	RV	—	—	—	—	—	—	—	—	—	—	Not released			—
Ohio State	TDS	4	17	16	—	—	—	—	—	—	—	—	—	—	—	—	—	—
Ohio State	CSN	9	13	16	25	—	—	—	—	—	—	—	—	—	Not released			—
Penn State	USC	—	—	—	—	—	—	—	—	—	—	—	—	—	Not released			—
Penn State	TDS	—	—	—	—	—	—	—	—	—	—	—	—	—	—	—	—	—
Penn State	CSN	—	—	RV	—	—	—	—	—	—	—	—	—	—	Not released			—
Rutgers	USC	—	—	—	—	—	—	—	18	13	—	—	—	—	Not released			—
Rutgers	TDS	—	—	—	—	—	—	—	18	16	—	—	—	—	—	—	—	—
Rutgers	CSN	—	—	RV	—	—	—	—	RV	21	24	—	—	—	Not released			—
UCLA	USC	RV	—	—	—	—	—	—	—	—	—	—	—	—	Not released			—
UCLA	TDS	—	—	—	—	—	—	—	—	—	—	—	—	—	14	—	—	—
UCLA	CSN	24	RV	—	—	—	—	—	—	—	—	—	—	—	Not released			RV
Washington	USC	RV	—	—	—	—	—	—	22	21	17	14	15	23	Not released			1 (6)
Washington	TDS	—	—	—	—	—	—	—	21	20	20	14	16	21	24	12	7	1
Washington	CSN	25	RV	—	—	—	—	—	RV	25	20	14	16	21	Not released			RV
Wisconsin	USC	—	—	—	—	—	—	—	—	—	—	—	—	—	Not released			—
Wisconsin	TDS	—	—	—	—	—	—	—	—	—	—	—	—	—	—	—	—	—
Wisconsin	CSN	—	—	—	—	—	—	—	—	—	—	—	—	—	Not released			—

=== Regional rankings - USC North Region ===
Legend
Increase in ranking
Decrease in ranking
Not ranked previous week

The United Soccer Coaches' North region ranks teams across the Big Ten, Horizon, and Ohio Valley Conferences.

	Wk 1	Wk 2	Wk 3	Wk 4	Wk 5	Wk 6	Wk 7	Wk 8	Wk 9	Wk 10	Wk 11	Wk 12
Indiana	1	1	1	2	2	2	3	2	2	3	4	2
Maryland	—	4	2	3	3	1	1	1	1	1	1	1
Michigan	2	2	3	1	1	3	2	4	3	4	3	3
Michigan State	5	—	—	—	—	5	8	8	—	—	—	—
Northwestern	4	7	7	7	5	9	9	7	6	7	6	7
Ohio State	—	6	9	—	—	—	—	—	—	—	—	—
Penn State	—	—	—	—	—	—	—	—	—	—	—	—
Rutgers	3	3	5	5	6	6	6	3	5	5	5	6
UCLA	—	—	—	—	—	—	—	—	—	—	—	5
Washington	—	—	—	6	8	7	4	5	4	2	2	4
Wisconsin	—	9	10	—	—	—	—	—	—	—	—	—

== Postseason ==
=== B1G Tournament ===
Semifinals; November 12
2	Washington	0
3	Michigan	2
1	Maryland	0
4	UCLA	2

Championship; November 16
3	Michigan	0
4	UCLA	5

==== All-Tournament team ====
Player	Team
Tristen Rose	Maryland
Chris Steinleitner	Maryland
Nicholas Cassiday	Michigan
Matthew Fisher	Michigan
Mitar Mitrovich	Michigan
Konstantinos Georgallides	UCLA
Ander Marticorena	UCLA
Shakir Nixon	UCLA
Sergi Solans Ormo (MOP)	UCLA
Joe Dale	Washington
Connor Lofy	Washington

=== NCAA Tournament ===
In addition to Big Ten tournament champions, UCLA, four other Big Ten teams received at-large berths into the NCAA tournament. Regular season champions, Maryland, and Indiana received byes to the second round.

Seed	Region	School	1st round	2nd round	3rd round	Quarterfinals	Semifinals	Championship
4	Maryland	Maryland	BYE	T 1–1 (W 4–3 p) vs. North Carolina – (College Park)	W 3–0 vs. (13) UConn – (College Park)	L 1–3 Washington – (College Park)	—	—
6	Princeton	Indiana	BYE	L 0–1 vs. Saint Louis – (Bloomington)	—	—	—	—
—N/a	Vermont	UCLA	L 0–1 vs. Grand Canyon – (Los Angeles)	—	—	—	—	—
—N/a	Maryland	Washington	W 3–2 at Oregon State – (Corvallis)	W 1–0 at (5) SMU – (Dallas)	W 1–0 at (12) Stanford – (Palo Alto)	W 3–1 at (4) Maryland – (College Park)	W 3–1 Furman – (Cary)	W 3–2 (15) NC State – (Cary)
—N/a	Princeton	Michigan	L 0–1 vs. Notre Dame – (Ann Arbor)	—	—	—	—	—
W–L–D (%):			1–2–0 (.333)	1–1–1 (.500)	2–0–0 (1.000)	1–1–0 (.500)	1–0–0 (1.000)	1–0–0 (1.000) Total: 7–4–1 (.625)

== Player statistics ==
As of November 20, 2025

=== Goals ===
Rank	Player	College	Goals
1	(United States) Palmer Ault	Indiana	16
1	(Spain) Sergi Solans	UCLA	16
3	(United States) Charlie Kosakoff	Washington	11
4	(Uganda) Sadam Masereka	Maryland	9
5	(United States) Zach Ramsey	Washington	8
6	(France) Stephane Njike	Maryland	7
6	(Germany) Joschi Schelb	Rutgers	7
8	(United States) Grayson Elmquist	Michigan	6

=== Assists ===
Rank	Player	College	Assists
1	(United States) Richie Aman	Washington	14
2	(Denmark) Philip Naef	UCLA	11
3	(United States) Palmer Ault	Indiana	10
4	(United States) Zach Ramsey	Washington	8
4	(United States) Alex Hall	Washington	8
4	(United States) Albi Ndrenika	Maryland	8
7	(United States) Charlie Kosakoff	Washington	7
7	(France) Stephane Njike	Maryland	7
7	(Italy) Joseph Picotto	Maryland	7
10	(Spain) Sergi Solans	UCLA	6
10	(United States) Rocket Ritarita	Maryland	6
10	(Ghana) Collins Oduro	Indiana	6
10	(New Zealand) Thomas Raimbault	Wisconsin	6
10	(Spain) Alejandro Santamaria	Northwestern	6
10	(Spain) Ander Marticorena	UCLA	6

=== Points ===
Two points for a goal, one point for an assist.

Rank	Player	College	Points
1	(United States) Palmer Ault	Indiana	42
2	(Spain) Sergi Solans	UCLA	38
3	(United States) Charlie Kosakoff	Washington	29
4	(United States) Zach Ramsey	Washington	24
5	(Uganda) Sadam Masereka	Maryland	23
6	(United States) Richie Aman	Washington	22
7	(France) Stephane Njike	Maryland	21
8	(Germany) Joschi Schelb	Rutgers	18
8	(United States) Alex Hall	Washington	18
10	(United States) Albi Ndrenika	Maryland	16

== Awards and honors ==
=== Player of the week honors ===
Following each week's games, Big Ten conference officials select the players of the week.

Week	Offensive		Defensive		Goalkeeper		Freshman	
Week	Player	Team	Player	Team	Player	Team	Player	Team
Week 1 (Aug. 26)	Jacopo Fedrizzi	Indiana	Fritz Volmar	Northwestern	Laurin Mack	Maryland	Aaron O'Reilly	Northwestern
Week 2 (Sep. 2)	Palmer Ault	Indiana	Nick McHenry	Ohio State	Holden Brown	Indiana	Luke Spadafora	Michigan State
Week 2 (Sep. 2)	Joschi Schelb	Rutgers	Nick McHenry	Ohio State	Holden Brown	Indiana	Luke Spadafora	Michigan State
Week 3 (Sep. 9)	Collins Oduro	Indiana	Breckin Minzey	Indiana	Holden Brown	Indiana	Rocket Ritarita	Maryland
Week 4 (Sep. 16)	Charlie Kosakoff	Washington	Nick McHenry	Ohio State	Ciaran Dalton	Rutgers	Kyle Pierson	Michigan
Week 4 (Sep. 23)	Palmer Ault	Indiana	Josh Maher	Indiana	Isaiah Goldson	Michigan	Aaron Hurge	Ohio State
Week 5 (Sep. 30)	Richie Aman	Washington	Harrison Bertos	Washington	Zac Kelly	Michigan State	Peter Soudan	Michigan State
Week 6 (Oct. 7)	Alex Hall	Washington	Asher Hestad	Washington	Matisse Hebert	Wisconsin	Jonathan Evans	Penn State
Week 7 (Oct. 14)	Leon Koehl	Maryland	Nick Collins	Rutgers	Laurin Mack	Maryland	Andrew Nohnson	Northwestern
Week 8 (Oct. 21)	Palmer Ault	Indiana	Tristen Rose	Maryland	Laurin Mack	Maryland	Judewellin Michel	Indiana
Week 9 (Oct. 28)	Sergi Solans Ormo	UCLA	Egor Akulov	Washington	Jadon Bowton	Washington	Ander Marticorena	UCLA
Week 10 (Nov. 4)	Albi Ndrenika	Maryland	Lasse Kelp	Maryland	Rafael Ponce de Leon	Northwestern	Aaron O’Reilly	Northwestern
Week 11 (Nov. 11)	Sadam Masereka	Maryland	Andrew Joshnson	Northwestern	Jonathan Evans	Penn State	Colton Swan	Indiana
Week 11 (Nov. 11)	Sergi Solans Ormo	UCLA	Andrew Joshnson	Northwestern	Jonathan Evans	Penn State	Colton Swan	Indiana

=== Postseason honors ===
Unanimous selections in bold.

**2025 Big Ten Men's Soccer Individual Awards**
Award	Recipient(s)
Offensive Player of the Year	Palmer Ault, Indiana
Midfielder of the Year	Richie Aman, Washington
Defensive Player of the Year	Lasse Kelp, Maryland
Goalkeeper of the Year	Laurin Mack, Maryland
Coach of the Year	Sasho Cirovski, Maryland
Freshman of the Year	Peter Soudan, Michigan State

**2025 Big Ten Men's Soccer All-Conference Teams**
First Team Honorees	Second Team Honorees	All-Freshman Team Honorees	Sportsmanship Team Honorees
Palmer Ault, F, Indiana; Luca Costabile, D, Maryland; Lasse Kelp, D, Maryland; Leon Koehl, M, Maryland; Laurin Mack, GK, Maryland; Sadam Masereka, F, Maryland; Stephane Njike, F, Maryland; Sergi Solans Ormo, F, UCLA; Richie Aman, M, Washington; Harrison Bertos, D, Washington; Alex Hall, M, Washington; Zach Ramsey, M, Washington	Collins Oduro, M, Indiana; Albi Ndrenika, F, Maryland; William Baker, D, Michigan; Matthew Fisher, D, Michigan; Nolan Miller, D, Michigan; Shuma Sasaki, F, Michigan; Zac Kelly, GK, Michigan State; Joe Suchecki, M, Northwestern; Joschi Schleb, M, Rutgers; Jadon Bowton, GK, Washington; Charlie Kosakoff, F, Washington	Colton Swan, F, Indiana; Rocket Ritarita, F, Maryland; Farouk Cisse, D, Maryland; Peter Soudan, M, Michigan State; Luke Spadafora, M, Michigan State; Aaron O'Reilly, F, Northwestern; Aaron Hurge, M, Ohio State; Jonathan Evans, GK, Penn State; Braxton Montgomery, D, Rutgers; Ander Marticorena, M, UCLA; Asher Hestad, D, Washington; Isaac Brown-Samper, D, Wisconsin	Alex Barger, Jr., Indiana; Luca Costabile, Sr., Maryland; Nicholas Cassiday, Sr., Michigan; Zac Kelly, Sr., Michigan State; Jayvin Van Deventer, Sr., Northwestern; Luciano Pechota, Sr., Ohio State; Van Danielson, Sr., Penn State; Nestor Cabrera, Sr., Rutgers; Tre Wright, Jr., UCLA; Conner Leber, Sr., Washington; Thomas Raimbault, Sr., Wisconsin

== MLS SuperDraft ==
=== Total picks by school ===
Team	Round 1	Round 2	Round 3	Total
Indiana	–	1	–	1
Maryland	–	2	2	4
Michigan	1	–	–	1
Michigan State	–	–	–	–
Northwestern	–	–	–	–
Ohio State	–	–	–	–
Penn State	–	–	–	–
Rutgers	–	–	–	–
UCLA	–	3	–	3
Washington	2	2	1	5
Wisconsin	–	–	–	–
Total	3	8	3	14

=== List of selections ===
Round	Pick #	MLS team	Player	Position	College
1	8	D.C. United	(United States) Richie Aman	FW	Washington
1	9	Orlando City SC	(United States) Nolan Miller	DF	Michigan
1	17	Vancouver Whitecaps FC	(United States) Zach Ramsey	MF	Washington
2	33	Real Salt Lake	(United States) Tre Wright	DF	UCLA
2	34	Sporting Kansas City	(Uganda) Sadam Masereka	FW	Maryland
2	38	New England Revolution	(Haiti) Schinieder Mimy	DF	UCLA
2	45	Portland Timbers	(Barbados) Colin Griffith	FW	Maryland
2	49	Columbus Crew	(United States) Tarun Karumanchi	MF	UCLA
2	51	Seattle Sounders FC	(United States) Joe Dale	MF	Washington
2	56	Colorado Rapids	(United States) Asher Hestad	DF	Washington
2	60	Inter Miami	(United States) Alex Barger	DF	Indiana
3	61	D.C. United	(Cameroon) Stephane Njike	FW	Maryland
3	85	D.C. United	(Germany) Lasse Kelp	DF	Maryland
3	89	Vancouver Whitecaps FC	(United States) Connor Lofy	MF	Washington
