= 2025 Indiana Hoosiers men's soccer team =

College soccer season

2025 Indiana Hoosiers men's soccer
- Conference: Big Ten Conference
- U. Soc. Coaches poll: No. 22
- Record: 12–6–1 (5–5–0 Big Ten)
- Head coach: Todd Yeagley (17th season)
- Home stadium: Bill Armstrong Stadium

Uniform
Home	Away

2025 Big Ten Conference men's soccer standings
	Conf.						Overall
Team	W		L		T	PCT	W		L		T	PCT
No. 7 Maryland ‍†‍‍^{y}	8	–	0	–	2	.900	13	–	2	–	4	.789
No. 1 Washington ‍‍‍^{y}	7	–	3	–	0	.700	16	–	6	–	2	.708
Michigan ‍‍‍^{y}	6	–	2	–	3	.682	12	–	4	–	4	.700
UCLA ‍‍‡‍^{y}	5	–	3	–	2	.600	8	–	6	–	5	.553
No. 22 Indiana ‍‍‍^{y}	5	–	5	–	0	.500	12	–	6	–	1	.658
Wisconsin ‍‍‍	4	–	6	–	0	.400	8	–	8	–	0	.500
Northwestern ‍‍‍	3	–	5	–	2	.400	8	–	6	–	3	.559
Rutgers ‍‍‍	3	–	5	–	2	.400	8	–	6	–	3	.559
Ohio State ‍‍‍	3	–	7	–	0	.300	6	–	10	–	0	.375
Michigan State ‍‍‍	2	–	5	–	3	.350	5	–	8	–	3	.406
Penn State ‍‍‍	1	–	6	–	3	.250	5	–	8	–	4	.412
† – Conference champion ‡ – 2025 B1G tournament champion y – Invited to the 2025 NCAA Tournament; As of May 2, 2026; Rankings from United Soccer Coaches; Source: Big Ten

The 2025 Indiana Hoosiers men's soccer team represented Indiana University during the 2025 NCAA Division I men's soccer season. The Hoosiers were led by head coach Todd Yeagley, in his 17th season. They played their home games at Bill Armstrong Stadium in Bloomington, Indiana.

The Hoosiers began their season ranked eleventh in the polls and started the season with a tie against Clemson. They won the next five games, including wins against 14th-ranked Oregon State and 15th-ranked Saint Louis. They won six of the next nine, including a win against 25th-ranked Kentucky. They finished the last three games of the season 1–3, with a loss to 4th-ranked Maryland. The Hoosiers then lost in the first round of the 2025 NCAA Division I men's soccer tournament to 21st-ranked Saint Louis.

== Background ==
The Hoosiers finished the 2024 season 11–5–5 overall and 7–1–2 in the 2024 Big Ten Conference men's soccer season. They were the regular season Big Ten Conference champions, and lost in the Sweet 16 of the 2024 NCAA Division I men's soccer tournament to Denver.

== Player movement ==
=== Players leaving ===
Departures
Name	Number	Pos.	Height	Weight	Year	Hometown	Reason for Departure
JT Harms	1	GK	6'1"	181	Graduate Student	Whitefish Bay, Wisconsin	Graduated
Joel Demian	3	DF	5'10"	165	Sophomore	Langley, Canada	Transferred to Ohio State
Jansen Miller	5	DF	6'2"	180	RS-Senior	Ballwin, Missouri	Graduated
Jack Lindimore	6	DF	6'1"	175	Freshman	New Albany, Ohio	Transferred to Georgetown
Justin Weiss	7	FW	5'9"		Graduate Student	Syosset, New York	Graduated
Samuel Sarver	9	FW	5'10"	156	Senior	Chesterland, Ohio	Graduated
Tommy Mihalic	10	FW	5'11"	169	Senior	Skokie, Illinois	Graduated
Lucas Wolthers	18	FW	6'1"	180	RS-Freshman	Hendersonville, Tennessee	Transferred to Belmont
Patrick McDonald	22	MF	5'11"	140	Senior	Greensboro, North Carolina	Graduated
Luke Jeffus	24	MF	5'11"	170	Graduate Student	Sand Springs, Oklahoma	Graduated
Grant Yeagley	28	MF	6'0"	160	RS-Junior	Bloomington, Indiana	Graduated
Aidan Mountoure	32	GK	6'0"	160	Graduate Student	Los Altos Hills, California	Graduated
Miles Imparato	33	MF	5'10"	150	Freshman	Tampa, Florida	Transferred to Duquesne
Drew Thompson	36	MF	5'10"	150	Freshman	Brownsburg, Indiana	Transferred to Fairfield

=== Player arriving ===
==== Incoming transfers ====
Incoming transfers
Name	Number	Pos.	Height	Weight	Year	Hometown	Previous School
AJ Piela	0	GK	5'11"	175	Sophomore	Columbus, Ohio	Louisville
Ben Do	2	DF	5'8"	150	Graduate Student	Seaside, California	Penn
Cristiano Bruletti	3	MF	5'11"	150	Senior	Commerce Township, Michigan	Michigan State
Victor Akoum	5	DF	6'3"	195	Junior	Edmonton, Canada	Virginia
Jacopo Fedrizzi	7	MF	6'2"	175	Junior	Giulia, Italy	Evansville
Palmer Ault	10	FW	5'10"	160	Senior	Noblesville, Indiana	Butler

==== Recruiting class ====
Name	Nat.	Hometown	Club	TDS Rating
Jayvyn Jackson; FW	USA	Orlando, Florida	OFC Barca	N/A
Judewellin Michel; GK	Canada	Montreal, Canada	CF Montréal	3/5 stars
Colton Swan; FW	USA	Detroit, Michigan	Colorado Rapids	4/5 stars

== Squad ==
=== Roster ===
As of Nov 2025

Note: Flags indicate national team as defined under FIFA eligibility rules; some limited exceptions apply. Players may hold more than one non-FIFA nationality.

No.	Pos.	Nation	Player
0	GK	USA	AJ Piela
1	GK	CAN	Judewellin Michel
2	DF	USA	Ben Do
3	DF	USA	Cristiano Bruletti
4	DF	USA	Josh Maher
5	DF	CAN	Victor Akoum
6	MF	USA	Jack Wagoner
7	MF	ITA	Jacopo Fedrizzi
8	MF	USA	Seth Stewart
9	FW	USA	Colton Swan
10	FW	USA	Palmer Ault
11	FW	GHA	Collins Oduro
12	FW	USA	Michael Nesci
13	MF	USA	Alex Barger
14	FW	USA	Easton Bogard

No.	Pos.	Nation	Player
15	FW	USA	Luka Bezerra
16	DF	USA	Charlie Heuer
17	MF	USA	Justin Shreffler
18	FW	USA	Jayvyn Jackson
19	MF	USA	Breckin Minzey
20	FW	USA	Clay Murador
22	MF	USA	EJ Dreher
23	MF	USA	Noah Joseph
24	FW	USA	Owen Sloan
25	DF	USA	Luke Reidell
26	DF	USA	Drew Gaydosh
27	MF	USA	Nolan Kinsella
30	GK	USA	Cooper Johnsen
99	GK	USA	Holden Brown

=== Team management ===
As of September 12, 2024

Position	Name
Head coach	(United States) Todd Yeagley
Associate Head Coach	(United States) Kevin Robson
Assistant coach	(United States) Tanner Thompson
Assistant coach	(United States) Christian Lomeli

== Schedule ==
Date Time, TV	Rank^{#}	Opponent^{#}	Result	Record	Site (Attendance) City, State
Preseason
August 11, 2025*; 7:30 p.m.	No. 11	No. 20 Western Michigan	W 5-0	–	Bill Armstrong Stadium; Bloomington, Indiana
August 16, 2025*; 8:00 p.m.	No. 11	No. 6 Louisville	W	–	Bill Armstrong Stadium; Bloomington, Indiana
Regular season
August 21, 2025*; 8:00 p.m., B1G+	No. 11	No. 9 Clemson	T 2-2	0–0–1	Bill Armstrong Stadium (6395); Bloomington, Indiana
August 24, 2025*; 7:30 p.m., B1G+	No. 11	San Francisco	W 3-2	1–0–1	Bill Armstrong Stadium (2404); Bloomington, Indiana
August 28, 2025*; 8:00 p.m., B1G+		Green Bay	W 2-1	2-0-1	Bill Armstrong Stadium (2438); Bloomington, Indiana
August 31, 2025*; 8:00 p.m., B1G+		No. 14 Oregon State	W 2-0	3-0-1	Bill Armstrong Stadium (3516); Bloomington, Indiana
September 3, 2025*; 8:00 p.m., B1G+		No. 15 Saint Louis	W 1-0	4-0-1	Bill Armstrong Stadium (2746); Bloomington, Indiana
September 7, 2025*; 7:30 p.m., ACCN		at Notre Dame	W 1-0	5-0-1	Alumni Stadium (1883); South Bend, Indiana
September 13, 2025; 8:00 p.m., B1G+		Michigan	L 2-3	5-1-1	Bill Armstrong Stadium (4652); Bloomington, Indiana
September 19, 2025; 7:00 p.m., B1G+		at Penn State	W 4-1	6-1-1	Jeffrey Field (1577); University Park, Pennsylvania
September 23, 2026; 6:00 p.m., BTN		at Michigan State	L 0-1	6-2-1	DeMartin Stadium (1030); East Lansing, Michigan
September 26, 2025; 8:00 p.m., BTN		UCLA	W 4-2	7-2-1	Bill Armstrong Stadium (3377); Bloomington, Indiana
October 3, 2025; 10:00 p.m., BTN		at Washington	L 0-3	7-3-1	Husky Soccer Stadium (2805); Seattle, Washington
October 10, 2025; 7:30 p.m., B1G+		Ohio State	W 4-2	8-3-1	Bill Armstrong Stadium (2672); Bloomington, Indiana
October 14, 2025*; 7:00 p.m., ESPN+		at No. 25 Kentucky	W 2-1	9-3-1	Wendell & Vickie Bell Soccer Complex (1048); Lexington, Kentucky
October 17, 2025*; 7:00 p.m., B1G+		Hanover	W 8-0	10-3-1	Bill Armstrong Stadium (1947); Bloomington, Indiana
October 21, 2025; 7:00 p.m., BTN		Wisconsin	W 4-1	11-3-1	Bill Armstrong Stadium (2097); Bloomington, Indiana
October 24, 2025; 8:00 p.m., BTN		at No. 4 Maryland	L 2-3	11-4-1	Ludwig Field (5580); College Park, Maryland
October 31, 2025; 7:30 p.m., B1G+		at Northwestern	L 0-2	11-5-1	Martin Stadium (468); Evanston, Illinois
November 7, 2025; 8:00 p.m., B1G+		Rutgers	W 5-0	12-5-1	Bill Armstrong Stadium (2236); Bloomington, Indiana
NCAA Tournament
November 23, 2025*; 12:00 p.m., ESPN+		No. 21 Saint Louis	L 0-1		Bill Armstrong Stadium (2255); Bloomington, Indiana
*Non-conference game. ^{#}Rankings from United Soccer Coaches. (#) Tournament seedings in parentheses. All times are in Eastern Time.

== Awards and honors ==
Recipient	Award	Date	Ref.
Jacopo Fedrizzi	Big Ten Offensive Player of the Week	August 26, 2025	
Palmer Ault	Big Ten Co-Offensive Player of the Week	September 2, 2025	
Holden Brown	Big Ten Goalkeeper of the Week	September 2, 2025	
Collins Oduro	Big Ten Offensive Player of the Week	September 9, 2025	
Breckin Minzey	Big Ten Defensive Player of the Week	September 9, 2025	
Holden Brown	Big Ten Goalkeeper of the Week	September 9, 2025	
Palmer Ault	Big Ten Offensive Player of the Week	September 23, 2025	
Josh Maher	Big Ten Defensive Player of the Week	September 23, 2025	
Palmer Ault	Big Ten Offensive Player of the Week	October 21, 2025	
Judewellin Michel	Big Ten Freshman of the Week	October 21, 2025	
Colton Swan	Big Ten Freshman of the Week	November 11, 2025	
Palmer Ault	Big Ten Offensive Player of the Year	November 13, 2025	
Palmer Ault	All-Big Ten First Team	November 13, 2025	
Collins Oduro	All-Big Ten Second Team	November 13, 2025	
Colton Swan	All-Big Ten Freshman Team	November 13, 2025	
Alex Barger	All-Big Ten Sportsmanship Team	November 13, 2025	

== 2025 MLS SuperDraft ==
Player	Team	Round	Pick #	Position
(United States) Jansen Miller	Sporting Kansas City	1	8	DF
(United States) Sam Sarver	FC Dallas	2	41	FW
(Ghana) Collins Oduro	Orlando City SC	2	57	FW

== 2026 MLS SuperDraft ==
Player	Team	Round	Pick #	Position
(United States) Alex Barger	Inter Miami	2	60	DF

== Rankings ==
Ranking movements Legend: ██ Increase in ranking ██ Decrease in ranking — = Not ranked
	Week																
Poll	Pre	1	2	3	4	5	6	7	8	9	10	11	12	13	14	15	Final
United Soccer	11	7	4	1	5	3	12	20	14	14	17	25	Not released				22
TopDrawer Soccer	18	10	3	2	9	5	13	25	21	21	23	—	—	—	—	—	—
