= 2026 Big Ten Conference men's soccer season =

2026 Big Ten Conference men' soccer season
- League: NCAA Division I
- Sport: Soccer
- Duration: August 22 - December 16, 2026
- Teams: 11
- TV partner(s): Fox Sports (Fox/FS2, BTN+)

2027 MLS SuperDraft

Regular season
- Champions: Indiana
- Season MVP: FW: TBD; MF: TBD; DF: TBD; GK: TBD

Tournament

Men's Soccer seasons
- 2025 2027–28

2026 Big Ten Conference men's soccer standings
	Conf.						Overall
Team	W		L		T	PCT	W		L		T	PCT
No. 3 Indiana ‍†‍‍	7	–	1	–	2	.800	14	–	1	–	3	.861
No. 11 Washington ‍‍‍	6	–	2	–	2	.700	10	–	4	–	3	.676
No. 15 Rutgers ‍‍‍	6	–	3	–	1	.650	8	–	6	–	2	.563
No. 22 Michigan State ‍‍‍	5	–	3	–	2	.600	10	–	4	–	3	.676
No. 9 Maryland ‍‍‍	5	–	4	–	1	.550	11	–	4	–	1	.719
No. 18 UCLA ‍‍‍	4	–	3	–	3	.550	9	–	3	–	5	.676
No. 24т Wisconsin ‍‍‍	3	–	3	–	4	.500	10	–	3	–	4	.706
Northwestern ‍‍‍	3	–	4	–	3	.450	6	–	6	–	4	.500
Ohio State ‍‍‍	3	–	6	–	1	.350	8	–	6	–	2	.563
Michigan ‍‍‍	0	–	6	–	4	.200	3	–	8	–	5	.344
Penn State ‍‍‍	0	–	7	–	3	.150	3	–	9	–	3	.300
† – Conference champion ‡ – 2026 B1G tournament champion y – Invited to the 2026 NCAA Tournament; As of November 4, 2026; Rankings from United Soccer Coaches; Source: Big Ten

The 2026 Big Ten Conference men's soccer season is the 35th season of college soccer play for the Big Ten Conference and part of the 2026 NCAA Division I men's soccer season.

== Previous season ==
The 2025 season was played from August until December 2025. The season was won by Maryland, who won their 26th-ever regular season conference championship, and their fifth-ever Big Ten regular season title. UCLA went on to win the 2025 Big Ten Conference men's soccer tournament, making it UCLA's first-ever Big Ten tournament title for men's soccer.

Big Ten regular season runners-up, Washington won the 2025 NCAA Division I men's soccer championship game, giving Washington their first ever men's soccer national title.

At the conclusion of the season, Indiana's Palmer Ault was named Offensive Player of the Year. Richie Aman won the Midfielder of the Year Award, while two Maryland players won the defensive season honors. Specifically Maryland's Lasse Kelp won Defender of the Year and Laurin Mack won Goalkeeper of the Year. Maryland head coach, Sasho Cirovski, won Coach of the Year, making it his third honor. Finally, Michigan State's Peter Soudan was named Freshman of the Year.

In the 2026 MLS SuperDraft, Big Ten Midfielder of the Year, Aman, was the first Big Ten pick, being drafted by D.C. United with the eighth overall pick. Aman was ultimately signed by United to a professional contract.

== Teams ==
=== Stadiums and locations ===
Team	Location	Stadium	Capacity
Indiana	Bloomington, Indiana	Bill Armstrong Stadium	6,500
Maryland	College Park, Maryland	Ludwig Field	7,000
Michigan	Ann Arbor, Michigan	U-M Soccer Stadium	2,200
Michigan State	Lansing, Michigan	DeMartin Soccer Complex	2,500
Northwestern	Evanston, Illinois	Lanny and Sharon Martin Stadium	3,000
Ohio State	Columbus, Ohio	Jesse Owens Memorial Stadium	10,000
Penn State	State College, Pennsylvania	Jeffrey Field	5,000
Rutgers	Piscataway, New Jersey	Yurcak Field	5,000
UCLA	Los Angeles, California	Wallis Annenberg Stadium	2,145
Washington	Seattle, Washington	Husky Soccer Stadium	3,250
Wisconsin	Madison, Wisconsin	Don McClimon Stadium	2,000

== Head coaches ==
Team	Head coach	Previous job	Years at school	Overall record	Big Ten record	Big Ten titles	Big Ten tournament titles	NCAA tournaments	NCAA College Cups	NCAA Championships
Indiana	Todd Yeagley	Wisconsin	17	223–85–60 (.688)	209–75–57 (.696)	5	5	17	4	1
Maryland	Sasho Cirovski	Hartford	33	451–181–76 (.691)	136–76–38 (.620)	4	3	30	9	3
Michigan	Chaka Daley	Providence	15	259–232–87 (.523)	58–54–30 (.514)	1	0	5	0	0
Michigan State	Damon Rensing	Michigan State (Asst.)	19	153–120–52 (.551)	52–54–26 (.492)	0	1	8	1	0
Northwestern	Russell Payne	Army	6	109–128–47 (.467)	25–24–8 (.509)	0	0	0	0	0
Ohio State	Brian Maisonneuve	Indiana (Asst.)	9	56–62–21 (.478)	23–38–8 (.391)	1	1	2	1	0
Penn State	Rob Dow	Vermont	1	77–37–10 (.661)	0–0–0 (–)	0	0	0	0	0
Rutgers	Jim McElderry	Fordham	8	162–165–64 (.496)	21–31–8 (.417)	0	1	1	0	0
UCLA	Ryan Jorden	Pacific	8	158–119–40 (.562)	8–7–5 (.525)	0	1	2	0	0
Washington	Jamie Clark	Creighton	16	229–87–44 (.697)	10–6–3 (.605)	0	0	2	1	1
Wisconsin	Neil Jones	Loyola Chicago	5	185–135–65 (.565)	11–17–8 (.417)	0	0	0	0	0

Notes:

- All records, appearances, titles, etc. are from time with current school only.
- Year at school includes 2026 season.
- Overall and Big Ten records are from time at current school only and are through the beginning of the season.

=== Coaching changes ===
During the 2025–26 offseason, Penn State head coach, Jeff Cook resigned from his position at Penn State to take a job offer within the front office of Major League Soccer. On December 11, 2025, Penn State hired former Vermont head coach, Rob Dow to succeed Cook.

== Preseason ==
=== Recruiting classes ===
Rankings
Team	TopDrawer Soccer	Prep Soccer	Signees
Indiana			
Maryland			
Michigan			
Michigan State			
Northwestern			
Ohio State			
Penn State			
Rutgers			
UCLA			
Washington			
Wisconsin			

Note: College Soccer News did not release a recruiting rankings for the 2026 season.

=== Preseason poll ===
Big Ten preseason poll
Predicted finish	Team
1	Washington
2	Maryland
3	Indiana
4	UCLA
5	Michigan
6	Ohio State
7	Rutgers
8	Northwestern
9	Wisconsin
10	Michigan State
11	Penn State

=== Preseason national polls ===
	United; Soccer	CSN	Top Drawer; Soccer
Indiana	22	17	22
Maryland	7	4	7
Michigan	RV	RV	
Michigan State			
Northwestern			
Ohio State			
Penn State			
Rutgers			
UCLA		RV	
Washington	1	1	1
Wisconsin			

=== Preseason players to watch ===
Defensive Players to Watch
Player	Nat.	Position	Class	Team
Josh Maher	USA	DF	Jr.	Indiana
Laurin Mack	GER	GK	Jr.	Maryland
Will Baker	USA	DF	Sr.	Michigan
Brandon Munson	USA	DF	Jr.	Michigan State
Fritz Volmar	USA	DF	Sr.	Northwestern
Martin Wurschmidt	NOR	DF	Jr.	Ohio State
Joe Buckley	USA	DF	So.	Penn State
Noah Förster	GER	DF	Jr.	Penn State
Daniel Peluffo-Wiese	URU	GK	Fr.	Penn State
Nick Collins	USA	DF	Sr.	Rutgers
Rafa Ponce de Leon	USA	GK	Gr.	Rutgers
Tre Wright	USA	DF	Sr.	UCLA
Harrison Bertos	USA	DF	Sr.	Washington
Ellis Jones	ENG	DF	Sr.	Wisconsin

Midfielders to Watch
Player	Nat.	Class	Team
Leon Koehl	GER	Sr.	Maryland
Albi Ndrenika	USA	Gr.	Maryland
Nico Pendleton	USA	Gr.	Michigan
Miles Merritt	USA	Sr.	Michigan State
Peter Soudan	USA	So.	Michigan State
Andrew Millar	USA	Gr.	Northwestern
Andre Roberts	USA	Sr.	Ohio State
Amer Lukovic	USA	Gr.	Rutgers
Philip Naef	DEN	Sr.	UCLA
Alex Hall	USA	Jr.	Washington
Zach Ramsey	USA	Jr.	Washington
Matthew Zachemski	USA	Jr.	Wisconsin

Forwards to Watch
Player	Nat.	Class	Team
Stephane Njike	FRA	Jr.	Indiana
Collins Oduro	GHA	Sr.	Indiana
Grayson Elmquist	USA	Sr.	Michigan
Aaron O'Reilly	USA	So.	Northwestern
Isaiah Chisolm	USA	Sr.	Ohio State
Oliver Roche	DEN	Sr.	UCLA
Luke van Heukelum	USA	Sr.	Wisconsin

=== Hermann Trophy ===
The Hermann Trophy preseason watchlist was released on August 19, 2026.

Player	Class	Position	School
Jaime Amaro	Jr.	MF	UCLA
Harrison Bertos	Sr.	DF	Washington
Matthew Fisher	Sr.	DF	Michigan
Laurin Mack	Jr.	GK	Maryland
Collins Oduro	Sr.	FW	Indiana

== Regular season ==
Home team listed second, Big Ten team listed in bold.

Index to colors and formatting
B1G member won
B1G member lost
B1G member tied
B1G teams in **bold**

=== Week 1 (Aug. 20–24) ===
Date	Time (ET)	Visiting team	Home team	Site	Result	Attendance
August 20	4:00 p.m.	**Rutgers**	American	Reeves Field • Washington, DC	**T** 0–0	
August 20	5:00 p.m.	New Haven	**Northwestern**	Martin Stadium • Evanston, IL	**W** 3–1	
August 20	6:00 p.m.	Loyola Marymount	**Michigan**	U-M Soccer Stadium • Ann Arbor, MI	**T** 0–0	650
August 20	7:00 p.m.	No. 7 **Maryland**	Pittsburgh	Armstrong Stadium • Pittsburgh, PA	**W** 2–1	1,074
August 20	7:00 p.m.	Albany	**Michigan State**	DeMartin Stadium • East Lansing, MI	**W** 6–2	1,205
August 20	7:00 p.m.	Mercyhurst	**Penn State**	Jeffrey Field • State College, PA	**W** 3–2	774
August 20	7:00 p.m.	**UCLA**	No. 11 Virginia	Klöckner Stadium • Charlottesville, VA	**W** 2–1	1,306
August 20	8:00 p.m.	Virginia Tech	**Ohio State**	Jesse Owens Memorial Stadium • Columbus, OH	**W** 1–0	1,266
August 20	8:00 p.m.	Saint Mary's (CA)	**Wisconsin**	McClimon Stadium • Madison, WI	**W** 5–0	479
August 20	10:00 p.m.	San Diego	No. 1 **Washington**	Husky Soccer Stadium • Seattle, WA	**L** 0–1	1,801
August 23	2:00 p.m.	Seattle U	**Michigan State**	DeMartin Stadium • East Lansing, MI	**W** 2–1	1,190
August 23	3:00 p.m.	Oakland	**Wisconsin**	McClimon Stadium • Madison, WI	**W** 5–0	458
August 23	7:30 p.m.	**Northwestern**	Notre Dame	Alumni Stadium • South Bend, IN	**T** 1–1	
August 23	7:30 p.m.	**Rutgers**	Georgetown	Shaw Field • Washington, DC	**L** 1–2	1,197
August 23	8:00 p.m.	Evansville	No. 22 **Indiana**	Armstrong Stadium • Bloomington, IN	**W** 3–0	3,430
August 23	8:00 p.m.	**Penn State**	Missouri State	Allison South Stadium • Springfield, MO	**L** 1–3	734
August 23	10:00 p.m.	No. 1 **Washington**	Gonzaga	Gonzaga Soccer Field • Spokane, WA	**W** 4–0	1,168
August 24	7:00 p.m.	New Haven	No. 7 **Maryland**	Ludwig Field • College Park, MD	**W** 3–2	1,258
August 24	7:00 p.m.	DePaul	**Ohio State**	Jesse Owens Memorial Stadium • Columbus, OH	**W** 6–0	769
August 24	10:00 p.m.	Cal State Bakersfield	**UCLA**	Wallis Annenberg Stadium • Los Angeles, CA	**T** 1–1	476

=== Week 2 (Aug. 25–31) ===
Date	Time (ET)	Visiting team	Home team	Site	Result	Attendance
August 27	4:00 p.m.	Niagara	**Michigan**	U-M Soccer Stadium • Ann Arbor, MI	**W** 3–1	661
August 27	7:00 p.m.	No. 23 **Wisconsin**	Western Michigan	WMU Soccer Complex • Kalamazoo, MI	**W** 1–0	521
August 27	7:30 p.m.	SIUE	No. 24 **Michigan State**	DeMartin Stadium • East Lansing, MI	**W** 4–0	2,927
August 27	8:00 p.m.	Butler	No. 14 **Indiana**	Armstrong Stadium • Bloomington, IN	**W** 1–0	3,080
August 27	10:30 p.m.	No. 3 Portland	No. 11 **Washington**	Husky Soccer Stadium • Seattle, WA	**W** 4–2	1,775
August 28	7:00 p.m.	Pittsburgh	**Penn State**	Jeffrey Field • State College, PA	**L** 1–2	1,502
August 28	7:00 p.m.	Sacred Heart	**Rutgers**	Yurcak Field • Piscataway, NJ	**W** 4–1	456
August 28	8:00 p.m.	**Northwestern**	Evansville	Arad McCutchan Stadium • Evansville, IN	**W** 2–1	471
August 28	8:00 p.m.	Memphis	No. 22 **Ohio State**	Jesse Owens Memorial Stadium • Columbus, OH	**W** 2–0	1,266
August 28	10:00 p.m.	Denver	No. 17 **UCLA**	Wallis Annenberg Stadium • Los Angeles, CA	**W** 3–0	464
August 29	7:00 p.m.	No. 9 High Point	No. 4 **Maryland**	Ludwig Field • College Park, MD	**W** 1–0	5,123
August 30	2:00 p.m.	SIUE	**Michigan**	U-M Soccer Stadium • Ann Arbor, MI	**W** 3–2	1,066
August 30	2:00 p.m.	Niagara	No. 24 **Michigan State**	DeMartin Stadium • East Lansing, MI	**W** 4–1	2,056
August 30	10:00 p.m.	No. 11 **Washington**	No. 25 Oregon State	Paul Lorenz Field • Corvallis, OR	**L** 3–4	996
August 31	7:00 p.m.	No. 14 **Indiana**	Louisville	Lynn Stadium • Louisville, KY	**T** 1–1	1,520
August 31	7:30 p.m.	Xavier	**Northwestern**	Martin Stadium • Evanston, IL	**L** 2–3	226
August 31	8:00 p.m.	Marquette	No. 23 **Wisconsin**	McClimon Stadium • Madison, WI	**W** 3–1	478

=== Week 3 (Sep. 1–7) ===
Date	Time (ET)	Visiting team	Home team	Site	Result	Attendance
September 1	2:00 p.m.	No. 12 **UCLA**	California	Edwards Stadium • Berkeley, CA	**T** 2–2	433
September 1	7:00 p.m.	Bucknell	**Penn State**	Jeffrey Field • State College, PA	**Canceled**	
September 3	4:30 p.m.	Northern Kentucky	No. 4 **Ohio State**	Jesse Owens Memorial Stadium • Columbus, OH	**W** 5–0	656
September 3	7:00 p.m.	Pittsburgh	No. 8 **Michigan State**	DeMartin Stadium • East Lansing, MI	**T** 0–0	1,532
September 3	10:30 p.m.	Cal State Fullerton	**Washington**	Husky Soccer Stadium • Seattle, WA	**T** 2–2	1,435
September 4	7:00 p.m.	Yale	**Penn State**	Jeffrey Field • State College, PA	**W** 1–0	1,458
September 4	7:00 p.m.	Seton Hall	**Rutgers**	Yurcak Field • Piscataway, NJ	**L** 0–1	594
September 4	7:30 p.m.	Delaware	No. 2 **Maryland**	Ludwig Field • College Park, MD	**W** 4–3	2,835
September 4	8:00 p.m.	Cal Poly	No. 6 **Indiana**	Armstrong Stadium • Bloomington, IN	**W** 2–0	3,012
September 5	2:00 p.m.	**Northwestern**	Marquette	Valley Fields • Milwaukee, WI	**L** 1–3	276
September 5	9:00 p.m.	No. 17 **Wisconsin**	Portland	Merlo Field • Portland, OR	**W** 2–1	2,189
September 5	10:30 p.m.	UC Davis	**Washington**	Husky Soccer Stadium • Seattle, WA	**W** 4–0	1,786
September 6	3:30 p.m.	**Michigan**	Notre Dame	Alumni Stadium • South Bend, IN	**L** 1–2	1,004
September 6	10:00 p.m.	Omaha	No. 12 **UCLA**	Wallis Annenberg Stadium • Los Angeles, CA	**W** 2–1	307
September 7	7:00 p.m.	No. 5 Georgetown	No. 2 **Maryland**	Ludwig Field • College Park, MD	**W** 3–2	6,110
September 7	7:00 p.m.	No. 21 UCSB	**Rutgers**	Yurcak Field • Piscataway, NJ	**L** 0–1	231
September 7	8:00 p.m.	Denver	No. 6 **Indiana**	Armstrong Stadium • Bloomington, IN	**W** 3–1	2,721

=== Week 4 (Sep. 8–14) ===
Date	Time (ET)	Visiting team	Home team	Site	Result	Attendance
September 8	7:30 p.m.	No. 3 **Ohio State**	Kentucky	Bell Soccer Complex • Lexington, KY	**W** 4–1	884
September 11	7:00 p.m.	No. 5 **Indiana**	**Michigan**	U-M Soccer Stadium • Ann Arbor, MI	**IU** 1–0	2,382
September 11	7:00 p.m.	No. 11 **UCLA**	**Rutgers**	Yurcak Field • Piscataway, NJ	**RUT** 3–1	367
September 11	7:00 p.m.	No. 3 **Ohio State**	No. 8 **Wisconsin**	McClimon Stadium • Madison, WI	**T** 1–1	1,329
September 11	7:30 p.m.	No. 2 **Maryland**	**Northwestern**	Martin Stadium • Evanston, IL	**NU** 4–0	462
September 11	8:00 p.m.	No. 10 **Michigan State**	Kansas City	Durwood Soccer Stadium • Kansas City, MO	**L** 1–3	675
September 11	10:30 p.m.	**Penn State**	**Washington**	Husky Soccer Stadium • Seattle, WA	**UW** 4–2	2,498

=== Week 5 (Sep. 15–21) ===
Date	Time (ET)	Visiting team	Home team	Site	Result	Attendance
September 15	7:00 p.m.	**Northwestern**	No. 19 **Michigan State**	DeMartin Stadium • East Lansing, MI	**MSU** 2–0	1,087
September 15	7:00 p.m.	No. 11 Princeton	**Rutgers**	Yurcak Field • Piscataway, NJ (rivalry)	**W** 2–0	508
September 18	6:00 p.m.	No. 7 **Wisconsin**	No. 8 **Maryland**	Ludwig Field • College Park, MD		
September 18	7:00 p.m.	**Rutgers**	No. 3 **Ohio State**	Jesse Owens Memorial Stadium • Columbus, OH		
September 18	7:00 p.m.	No. 19 **Michigan State**	**Penn State**	Jeffrey Field • State College, PA		
September 18	7:30 p.m.	**Washington**	No. 2 **Indiana**	Armstrong Stadium • Bloomington, IN		
September 18	10:00 p.m.	**Michigan**	**UCLA**	Wallis Annenberg Stadium • Los Angeles, CA		
September 19	8:00 p.m.	**Northwestern**	UIC	Flames Field • Chicago, IL		
September 21	7:00 p.m.	**Washington**	No. 3 **Ohio State**	Jesse Owens Memorial Stadium • Columbus, OH		

=== Week 6 (Sep. 22–28) ===
Date	Time (ET)	Visiting team	Home team	Site	Result	Attendance
September 22	8:00 p.m.	Indiana	**Wisconsin**	McClimon Stadium • Madison, WI		
September 25	1:00 p.m.	Penn State	**Indiana**	Armstrong Stadium • Bloomington, IN		
September 25	6:00 p.m.	Wisconsin	**Michigan State**	DeMartin Stadium • East Lansing, MI		
September 25	7:00 p.m.	Michigan	**Northwestern**	Martin Stadium • Evanston, IL		
September 25	7:00 p.m.	UCLA	**Maryland**	Ludwig Field • College Park, MD		
September 25	7:00 p.m.	Ohio State	George Mason	George Mason Stadium • Fairfax, VA		
September 25	10:30 p.m.	Rutgers	**Washington**	Husky Soccer Stadium • Seattle, WA		
September 28	4:00 p.m.	UCLA	**Penn State**	Jeffrey Field • State College, PA		

=== Week 7 (Sep. 29–Oct. 5) ===
Date	Time (ET)	Visiting team	Home team	Site	Result	Attendance
September 29	7:00 p.m.	Oakland	Michigan	U-M Soccer Stadium • Ann Arbor, MI		
October 2	7:00 p.m.	**Maryland**	Indiana	Armstrong Stadium • College Park, MD		
October 2	7:00 p.m.	**Ohio State**	Penn State	Jeffrey Field • State College, PA		
October 2	7:00 p.m.	**Northwestern**	Rutgers	Yurcak Field • Piscataway, NJ		
October 2	10:30 p.m.	**Wisconsin**	Washington	Husky Soccer Stadium • Seattle, WA		
October 3	9:00 p.m.	**Michigan State**	UCLA	Wallis Annenberg Stadium • Los Angeles, CA		
October 4	2:00 p.m.	Portland	Michigan	U-M Soccer Stadium • Ann Arbor, MI		

=== Week 8 (Oct. 6–12) ===
Date	Time (ET)	Visiting team	Home team	Site	Result	Attendance
October 6	6:00 p.m.	Lakeland (WI)	Wisconsin	McClimon Stadium • Madison, WI		
October 6	7:00 p.m.	**Maryland**	Rutgers	Yurcak Field • Piscataway, NJ		
October 6	8:00 p.m.	Kentucky	Indiana	Armstrong Stadium • College Park, MD		
October 6	10:00 p.m.	Westmont	UCLA	Wallis Annenberg Stadium • Los Angeles, CA		
October 9	7:00 p.m.	**Penn State**	Michigan	U-M Soccer Stadium • Ann Arbor, MI		
October 9	7:30 p.m.	Hanover	Indiana	Armstrong Stadium • College Park, MD		
October 9	7:30 p.m.	**Michigan State**	Maryland	Ludwig Field • College Park, MD		
October 10	8:00 p.m.	**Rutgers**	Wisconsin	McClimon Stadium • Madison, WI		
October 10	9:00 p.m.	**Ohio State**	UCLA	Wallis Annenberg Stadium • Los Angeles, CA		
October 10	10:00 p.m.	**Northwestern**	Washington	Husky Soccer Stadium • Seattle, WA		

=== Week 9 (Oct. 13–19) ===
Date	Time (ET)	Visiting team	Home team	Site	Result	Attendance
October 13	7:30 p.m.	**Michigan**	Michigan State	DeMartin Stadium • East Lansing, MI (Big Bear Trophy)		
October 14	10:00 p.m.	Seattle U	Washington	Husky Soccer Stadium • Seattle, WA (Fewing Cup)		
October 16	7:00 p.m.	**Maryland**	Michigan	U-M Soccer Stadium • Ann Arbor, MI		
October 16	7:00 p.m.	**Michigan State**	Ohio State	Jesse Owens Memorial Stadium • Columbus, OH		
October 16	7:00 p.m.	**Indiana**	Rutgers	Yurcak Field • Piscataway, NJ		
October 16	7:30 p.m.	**Penn State**	Northwestern	Martin Stadium • Evanston, IL		
October 16	8:00 p.m.	**UCLA**	Wisconsin	McClimon Stadium • Madison, WI		
October 19	7:00 p.m.	**UCLA**	Northwestern	Martin Stadium • Evanston, IL		

=== Week 10 (Oct. 20–26) ===
Date	Time (ET)	Visiting team	Home team	Site	Result	Attendance
October 20	6:00 p.m.	Evansville	Wisconsin	McClimon Stadium • Madison, WI		
October 20	7:00 p.m.	St. John's	Maryland	Ludwig Field • College Park, MD		
October 20	7:00 p.m.	**Indiana**	Ohio State	Jesse Owens Memorial Stadium • Columbus, OH		
October 20	7:00 p.m.	**Rutgers**	Penn State	Jeffrey Field • State College, PA		
October 23	7:00 p.m.	**Northwestern**	Indiana	Armstrong Stadium • College Park, MD		
October 23	7:00 p.m.	**Washington**	Michigan State	DeMartin Stadium • East Lansing, MI		
October 23	7:00 p.m.	**Michigan**	Rutgers	Yurcak Field • Piscataway, NJ		
October 23	7:00 p.m.	**Wisconsin**	Penn State	Jeffrey Field • State College, PA		
October 24	7:00 p.m.	**Ohio State**	Maryland	Ludwig Field • College Park, MD		
October 25	6:00 p.m.	San Diego	UCLA	Wallis Annenberg Stadium • Los Angeles, CA		
October 26	7:00 p.m.	**Washington**	Michigan	U-M Soccer Stadium • Ann Arbor, MI		

=== Week 11 (Oct. 27–Nov. 2) ===
Date	Time (ET)	Visiting team	Home team	Site	Result	Attendance
October 27	6:00 p.m.	Green Bay	Michigan State	DeMartin Stadium • East Lansing, MI		
October 28	7:00 p.m.	Duquesne	Penn State	Jeffrey Field • State College, PA		
October 30	7:00 p.m.	**Rutgers**	Michigan State	DeMartin Stadium • East Lansing, MI		
October 30	7:00 p.m.	**Northwestern**	Ohio State	Jesse Owens Memorial Stadium • Columbus, OH		
October 30	8:00 p.m.	**Michigan**	Wisconsin	McClimon Stadium • Madison, WI		
October 30	8:00 p.m.	**Maryland**	Washington	Husky Soccer Stadium • Seattle, WA		
October 30	10:00 p.m.	**Indiana**	UCLA	Wallis Annenberg Stadium • Los Angeles, CA		

=== Week 12 (Nov. 4–7) ===
Date	Time (ET)	Visiting team	Home team	Site	Result	Attendance
November 4	7:00 p.m.	**Penn State**	**Maryland**	Ludwig Field • College Park, MD		
November 4	8:00 p.m.	**Ohio State**	**Michigan**	U-M Soccer Stadium • Ann Arbor, MI (The Derby)		
November 4	8:00 p.m.	**Michigan State**	**Indiana**	Armstrong Stadium • Bloomington, IN		
November 4	8:00 p.m.	**Wisconsin**	**Northwestern**	Martin Stadium • Evanston, IL		
November 4	10:00 p.m.	**Washington**	**UCLA**	Wallis Annenberg Stadium • Los Angeles, CA		

== Rankings ==
=== National rankings ===
Legend
Increase in ranking
Decrease in ranking
Not ranked previous week

		Pre	Wk 1	Wk 2	Wk 3	Wk 4	Wk 5	Wk 6	Wk 7	Wk 8	Wk 9	Wk 10	Wk 11	Wk 12	Wk 13	Wk 14	Wk 15	Final
Indiana	USC	22	14	6	5	2	2	2	2	2	4	4	4	3	Not released			
Indiana	TDS	22	18	18	12	9	2	2	2	2	5	7	5	4				
Indiana	CSN	17	8	6	5	4	2	2	2	2	4	4	4		Not released			
Maryland	USC	7	4	2	2	8	4	6	7	14	11	11	11	9	Not released			
Maryland	TDS	7	4	2	2	12	7	12	12	18	16	10	11	9				
Maryland	CSN	4	2	2	2	5	6	4	6	9	7	8	7		Not released			
Michigan	USC	RV	—	—	—	—	—	—	—	—	—	—	—	—	Not released			
Michigan	TDS	—	—	—	—	—	—	—	—	—	—	—	—	—				
Michigan	CSN	RV	RV	—	—	—	—	—	—	—	—	—	—		Not released			
Michigan State	USC	—	24	8	10	19	11	8	19	12	6	8	16	22	Not released			
Michigan State	TDS	—	—	—	25	—	19	7	19	15	15	12	21	—				
Michigan State	CSN	—	—	RV	19	20	18	11	12	11	6	6	9		Not released			
Northwestern	USC	—	—	—	—	—	—	RV	—	—	—	—	—	—	Not released			
Northwestern	TDS	—	—	—	—	—	—	—	—	—	—	—	—	—				
Northwestern	CSN	—	—	—	—	—	—	RV	—	—	—	—	—		Not released			
Ohio State	USC	—	22	4	3	3	12	RV	RV	—	—	—	—	—	Not released			
Ohio State	TDS	—	—	7	4	5	13	—	—	—	—	—	—	—				
Ohio State	CSN	—	21	12	7	3	7	16	RV	—	—	—	—		Not released			
Penn State	USC	—	—	—	—	—	—	—	—	—	—	—	—	—	Not released			
Penn State	TDS	—	—	—	—	—	—	—	—	—	—	—	—	—				
Penn State	CSN	—	—	—	—	—	—	—	—	—	—	—	—		Not released			
Rutgers	USC	—	—	—	—	—	22	—	—	—	RV	—	23	15	Not released			
Rutgers	TDS	—	—	—	—	—	21	—	—	—	—	—	19	15				
Rutgers	CSN	—	—	—	—	—	RV	RV	RV	—	RV	RV	RV		Not released			
UCLA	USC	—	17	12	11	RV	—	—	21	10	19	22	25т	18	Not released			
UCLA	TDS	—	22	19	22	—	—	—	15	11	14	17	22	18				
UCLA	CSN	RV	25	18	18	23	RV	—	RV	23	19	20	20		Not released			
Washington	USC	1	11	RV	—	—	RV	15	14	13	7	7	6	11	Not released			
Washington	TDS	1	5	8	24	24	—	—	25	24	19	13	7	8				
Washington	CSN	1	6	10	15	16	23	21	19	21	17	16	12		Not released			
Wisconsin	USC	—	23	17	8	7	13	19	20	18	13	19	13	24т	Not released			
Wisconsin	TDS	—	—	—	11	6	14	14	21	20	18	15	16	19				
Wisconsin	CSN	—	RV	24	16	11	12	13	15	14	13	12	11		Not released			

=== Regional rankings - USC North Region ===
Legend
Increase in ranking
Decrease in ranking
Not ranked previous week

The United Soccer Coaches' North region ranks teams across the Big Ten, Horizon, and Ohio Valley Conferences.

	Wk 1	Wk 2	Wk 3	Wk 4	Wk 5	Wk 6	Wk 7	Wk 8	Wk 9	Wk 10	Wk 11	Wk 12
Indiana	2	2	3	1	1	1	1	2	2	1	1	
Maryland	1	1	1	2	4	2	3	3	5	5	2	
Michigan	10	9	9	9	—	—	—	—	—	—	—	
Michigan State	3	4	5	3	3	4	2	1	1	3	5	
Northwestern	7	8	8	8	9	9	8	9	8	—	9	
Ohio State	6	3	2	4	6	7	7	8	9	8	8	
Penn State	—	—	—	—	—	—	—	—	—	—	—	
Rutgers	—	—	—	5	8	8	—	7	7	4	3	
UCLA	—	6	7	10	5	6	5	5	6	7	6	
Washington	5	7	6	6	2	3	4	6	3	2	4	
Wisconsin	4	5	4	7	7	5	6	4	4	6	7	

== Postseason ==
=== B1G Tournament ===
Semifinals; November 11
2
3
1
4

Championship; November 15

==== All-Tournament team ====
Player	Team

=== NCAA Tournament ===
Seed	Region	School	1st round	2nd round	3rd round	Quarterfinals	Semifinals	Championship
		TBD						
W–L–D (%):			0–0–0 (–)	0–0–0 (–)	0–0–0 (–)	0–0–0 (–)	0–0–0 (–)	0–0–0 (–) Total: 0–0–0 (–)

== Player statistics ==
As of August 7, 2026

=== Goals ===
Rank	Player	College	Goals

=== Assists ===
Rank	Player	College	Assists

=== Points ===
Two points for a goal, one point for an assist.

Rank	Player	College	Points

== Awards and honors ==
=== Player of the week honors ===
Following each week's games, Big Ten conference officials select the players of the week.

Week	Offensive		Defensive		Goalkeeper		Freshman	
Week	Player	Team	Player	Team	Player	Team	Player	Team
Week 1 (Aug. 25)	Oliver Moller-Jensen	Indiana	Martin Wurschmidt	Ohio State	Alen Bean	Michigan	Said El Eyssami	Maryland
Week 2 (Sep. 1)	Grayson Elmquist	Michigan	Nick McHenry	Indiana	Laurin Mack	Maryland	Rodrigo Neri	Maryland
Week 3 (Sep. 8)	Albi Ndrenika	Maryland	Elijah Bishop	Ohio State	Judewellin Michel	Wisconsin	Rodrigo Neri (2)	Maryland
Week 4 (Sep. 15)	Zach Ramsey	Washington	Fritz Volmar	Northwestern	Dominic Pereira	Northwestern	—N/a	
Week 4 (Sep. 22)	William Pierce	Rutgers	Braxton Montgomery	Rutgers	Michal Mroz	Indiana	Said El Eyssami (2)	Maryland
Week 5 (Sep. 29)	Zach Ramsey (2)	Washington	Bryant Mayer	Northwestern	Stockton Short	Washington	Dominic Dono	Michigan State
Week 6 (Oct. 6)	Martin Wurschmidt	Ohio State	Tre Wright	UCLA	Michal Mroz (2)	Indiana	Shaun Brun	Washington
Week 7 (Oct. 13)	Oliver Moller-Jensen (2)	Indiana	Egor Akulov	Washington	Judewellin Michel (2)	Wisconsin	Christopher Salazar	Wisconsin
Week 8 (Oct. 20)	Francesco DiPonzio	Rutgers	Ellis Jones	Wisconsin	Rafael Ponce de Leon	Rutgers	Josue Pfrommer	Northwestern
Week 9 (Oct. 27)	Francesco DiPonzio (2)	Rutgers	Fritz Volmar (2)	Northwestern	Laurin Mack (2)	Maryland	Jake Goetting	Washington
Week 10 (Nov. 3)	Oliver Moller-Jensen (3)	Indiana	Joaquin Torres	Wisconsin	Rafael Ponce de Leon (2)	Rutgers	Jake Goetting (2)	Washington
Week 11 (Nov. 10)	Charlie Heuer	Indiana	Shakir Nixon	UCLA	Laurin Mack (3)	Maryland	Tristan Shaw	UCLA

=== Postseason honors ===
Unanimous selections in bold.

**2026 Big Ten Men's Soccer Individual Awards**
Award	Recipient(s)
Offensive Player of the Year	Zach Ramsey - Washington
Midfielder of the Year	Alex Hall - Washington
Defensive Player of the Year	Harrison Bertos - Washington
Goalkeeper of the Year	Michal Mroz - Indiana
Coach of the Year	Todd Yeagley - Indiana
Freshman of the Year	Rodrigo Neri - Maryland

**2026 Big Ten Men's Soccer All-Conference Teams**
First Team Honorees	Second Team Honorees	All-Freshman Team Honorees	Sportsmanship Team Honorees
Josh Maher - Indiana; Alex Matthews - Indiana; Oliver Moller-Jensen - Indiana; Michal Mroz - Indiana; Andrew Darakdijan - Michigan State; Miles Merritt - Michigan State; Brandon Munson - Michigan State; Nick Collins - Rutgers; Harrison Bertos - Washington; Alex Hall - Washington; Zach Ramsey - Washington	Easton Bogard - Indiana; Nick McHenry - Indiana; Laurin Mack - Maryland; Rodrigo Neri - Maryland; Richie Ludwig - Michigan State; Amer Lukovic - Rutgers; Zach Mastrodimos - Rutgers; Jaime Amaro - UCLA; Shakir Nixon - UCLA; Tre Wright - UCLA; Matthew Zachemski - Wisconsin	Michal Adu-Gyamfi - Indiana; Franklin Affanyi - Maryland; Said El Eyssami - Maryland; Rodrigo Neri - Maryland; Alex Gimple - Michigan; Josue Pfrommer - Northwestern; Jack Wayne - Ohio State; Sheridan McNish - Penn State; Jeffrey Bryjak - Rutgers; Hector Criado - Rutgers; Shaun Brun - Washington; Jake Goetting - Washington	Collins Oduro - Indiana; Albi Ndrenika - Maryland; Patrick O'Toole - Michigan; Connor O'Keefe - Michigan State; Italo Addimandi - Northwestern; Patrick McLaughlin - Ohio State; Morgan Marshall - Penn State; Simon Gorczowski - Rutgers; Philip Naef - UCLA; Chad Sovde - Washington; Markie Hrvojevic - Wisconsin

== MLS SuperDraft ==
=== Total picks by school ===
Team	Round 1	Round 2	Round 3	Total
Indiana				
Maryland				
Michigan				
Michigan State				
Northwestern				
Ohio State				
Penn State				
Rutgers				
UCLA				
Washington				
Wisconsin				
Total				

=== List of selections ===
Round	Pick #	MLS team	Player	Position	College
