= 2025 Washington Huskies men's soccer team =

College soccer season

2025 Washington Huskies men's soccer

NCAA tournament College Cup National Champions

National Championship Game, W 3–2^{OT} vs. NC State
- Conference: Big Ten Conference
- U. Soc. Coaches poll: No. 1
- TopDrawerSoccer.com: No. 1
- Record: 16–6–2 (7–3–0 B1G)
- Head coach: Jamie Clark (15th season)
- Assistant coaches: Richard Reece (21st season); Mark Collings (5th season); Ryan Fahey (2nd season)
- Home stadium: Husky Soccer Stadium

2025 Big Ten Conference men's soccer standings
	Conf.						Overall
Team	W		L		T	PCT	W		L		T	PCT
No. 1 Maryland ‍†‍‍^{y}	8	–	0	–	2	.900	13	–	2	–	4	.789
No. 23 Washington ‍‍‍^{y}	7	–	3	–	0	.700	16	–	6	–	2	.708
No. 16 Michigan ‍‍‍^{y}	6	–	2	–	3	.682	12	–	4	–	4	.700
UCLA ‍‍‡‍^{y}	5	–	3	–	2	.600	8	–	6	–	5	.553
No. 24 Indiana ‍‍‍^{y}	5	–	5	–	0	.500	12	–	6	–	1	.658
Wisconsin ‍‍‍	4	–	6	–	0	.400	8	–	8	–	0	.500
Northwestern ‍‍‍	3	–	5	–	2	.400	8	–	6	–	3	.559
Rutgers ‍‍‍	3	–	5	–	2	.400	8	–	6	–	3	.559
Ohio State ‍‍‍	3	–	7	–	0	.300	6	–	10	–	0	.375
Michigan State ‍‍‍	2	–	5	–	3	.350	5	–	8	–	3	.406
Penn State ‍‍‍	1	–	6	–	3	.250	5	–	8	–	4	.412
† – Conference champion ‡ – 2025 B1G tournament champion y – Invited to the 2025 NCAA Tournament; As of December 15, 2025; Rankings from United Soccer Coaches; Source: Big Ten

The 2025 Washington Huskies men's soccer team represented the University of Washington during the 2025 NCAA Division I men's soccer season. They were led by head coach Jamie Clark, in his fifteenth season. They played their home games at Husky Soccer Stadium. This was the team's 64th season playing organized men's college soccer and their second playing in the Big Ten Conference.

Regarded as the program's best season in its history, the Huskies won their first national championship this season, defeating NC State in the final.

== Preseason ==
=== Preseason B1G awards and honors ===
Preseason awards were announced in August 2025.

Preseason All-B1G Team
Player	Position	Class
Egor Akulov	DF	Senior
Richie Aman	FW	Senior
Charlie Kosakoff	FW	Junior

=== Big Ten coaches poll ===
The Big Ten Coaches poll was released in August 2025. Washington was predicted to finish fifth.

B1G coaches poll
Pos.	Team
1	Indiana
2	Maryland
3	Ohio State
4	UCLA
5	Washington
6	Michigan
7	Michigan State
8	Wisconsin
9	Rutgers
10	Penn State
11	Northwestern

== Personnel ==
=== Roster ===
As of 21 Oct 2025

Note: Flags indicate national team as defined under FIFA eligibility rules; some limited exceptions apply. Players may hold more than one non-FIFA nationality.

No.	Pos.	Nation	Player
0	GK	USA	Levi Bieber
00	GK	USA	Kenny Pierpoint
1	GK	USA	Jadon Bowton
2	DF	USA	Philip Kleemann
3	DF	USA	Harrison Bertos
4	DF	USA	Egor Akulov
5	DF	USA	Asher Hestad
6	MF	USA	Zach Ramsey
7	MF	USA	Alex Hall
8	MF	USA	Clarens Dollin
9	FW	USA	Charlie Kosakoff
10	MF	USA	Richie Aman
11	FW	USA	Nick O'Brien
12	DF	USA	Carter Gay
13	MF	USA	Kevin Hernandez

No.	Pos.	Nation	Player
14	MF	USA	Joe Dale
15	MF	SEN	Mani Diop
16	DF	USA	Zack Meier
17	MF	USA	Cameron Cruz
18	FW	USA	Nani Deperro
19	MF	USA	Mikey Sherlock
21	MF	USA	Osato Enabulele
22	DF	USA	Conner Leber
23	MF	USA	Sheehan Ganguly
26	MF	USA	Connor Lofy
30	GK	USA	Jaeger Felton
31	MF	USA	Brecken Bowers
33	MF	USA	Chad Sovde
44	DF	USA	Gabe Fernandez

== Schedule ==
Date Time, TV	Rank^{#}	Opponent^{#}	Result	Record	Site (Attendance) City, State
Non-conference regular season
August 21*; 6:00 pm, SLN		at No. 4 Denver	L 0–2	0–1	CIBER Field (579); Denver, CO
August 24*; 7:30 pm, P12N		at Oregon State	L 1–2	0–2	Paul Lorenz Field (494); Corvallis, OR
August 28*; 7:30 pm, BTN+		UC Davis	T 1–1	0–2–1	Husky Soccer Stadium (1,703); Seattle, WA
August 31*; 7:30 pm, BTN+		UNLV	W 4–0	1–2–1	Husky Soccer Stadium (1,042); Seattle, WA
September 4*; 7:00 pm, ESPN+		at Loyola Marymount	T 2–2	1–2–2	Emanuel Sullivan Field (488); Los Angeles, CA
September 8*; 7:30 pm, ESPN+		at Seattle U Fewing Cup	W 7–2	2–2–2	Championship Field (1,348); Seattle, WA
September 12; 7:30 pm, B1G+		Michigan State	W 2–1	3–2–2 (1–0)	Husky Soccer Stadium (1,958); Seattle, WA
September 16*; 7:00 pm, B1G+		Gonzaga	W 6–0	4–2–2	Husky Soccer Stadium (1,631); Seattle, WA
Big Ten regular season
September 20; 7:00 pm, B1G+		No. 8 Michigan	L 0–1	4–3–2 (1–1)	Husky Soccer Stadium (2,781); Seattle, WA
September 26; 5:00 pm, B1G+		at Wisconsin	W 2–0	5–3–2 (2–1)	Dan McClimon Stadium (464); Madison, WI
September 29; 5:00 pm, B1G+		at Northwestern	W 1–0	6–3–2 (3–1)	Martin Stadium (458); Evanston, IL
October 3; 7:00 pm, B1G+		No. 12 Indiana	W 3–0	7–3–2 (4–1)	Husky Soccer Stadium (2,805); Seattle, WA
October 17; 4:00 pm, B1G+	No. 21	at No. 13 Rutgers	W 2–0	8–3–2 (5–1)	Yurcak Field (3,276); Piscataway, NJ
October 20; 3:00 pm, B1G+	No. 21	at Penn State	W 2–1	9–3–2 (6–1)	Jeffrey Field (549); University Park, PA
October 24; 7:00 pm, B1G+	No. 17	Ohio State	W 5–0	10–3–2 (7–1)	Husky Soccer Stadium (2,444); Seattle, WA
October 31; 4:30 pm, FS2	No. 14	at No. 2 Maryland	L 0–1	10–4–2 (7–2)	Ludwig Field (2,432); College Park, MD
November 7; 5:00 pm, B1G+	No. 15	UCLA	L 2–4	10–5–2 (7–3)	Husky Soccer Stadium (2,184); Seattle, WA
Big Ten tournament
November 12; 1:00 pm, B1G+	(2) No. 23	vs. (3) Michigan; Semifinal	L 0–2	10–6–2	Ludwig Field (489); College Park, MD
NCAA tournament
November 20; 6:00 pm, P12N	No. 24	at No. 10 Oregon State; First round	W 3–2 ^{OT}	11–6–2	Paul Lorenz Field (1,220); Corvallis, OR
November 23; 11:00 am, ACCNX	No. 24	at (5) No. 25 SMU; Second round	W 1–0	12–6–2	Washburne Stadium (2,367); Dallas, TX
November 30; 5:00 pm, ACCNX	No. 12	at (12) No. 8 Stanford; Third round	W 1–0	13–6–2	Laird Q. Cagan Stadium (1,650); Palo Alto, CA
December 6; 11:00 am, ESPN+	No. 7	at (2) No. 2 Maryland; Quarterfinal	W 3–1	14–6–2	Ludwig Field (4,054); College Park, MD
December 12; 3:00 pm, ESPNU	No. 7	vs. (16) No. 1 Furman; Semifinal	W 3–1	15–6–2	First Horizon Stadium (10,945); Cary, NC
December 15; 6:00 pm, ESPNU	No. 7	vs. (15) No. 5 NC State; Final	W 3–2 ^{OT}	16–6–2	First Horizon Stadium (10,316); Cary, NC
*Non-conference game. ^{#}Rankings from United Soccer Coaches. (#) Tournament seedings in parentheses. All times are in Pacific Time.

== Rankings ==
Ranking movements Legend: ██ Increase in ranking ██ Decrease in ranking — = Not ranked RV = Received votes
	Week																	
Poll	Pre	1	2	3	4	5	6	7	8	9	10	11	12	13	14	15	16	Final
United Soccer	RV	—	—	—	—	—	—	22	21	17	14	15	23	Not released				1
TopDrawer Soccer	—	—	—	—	—	—	—	21	20	20	14	16	21	24	12	7	5	1
College Soccer News	25	RV	—	—	—	—	—	RV	25	20	14	16	21	RV	Not released			1

== Postseason ==
=== 2026 MLS SuperDraft ===
Player	Team	Round	Pick #	Position
Richie Aman	D.C. United	1	8	MF
Zach Ramsey	Vancouver Whitecaps	1	17	MF
Joe Dale	Seattle Sounders	2	51	MF
Asher Hestad	Colorado Rapids	2	56	DF
Connor Lofy	Vancouver Whitecaps	3	89	MF
