= 2025 NCAA Division I men's soccer championship game =

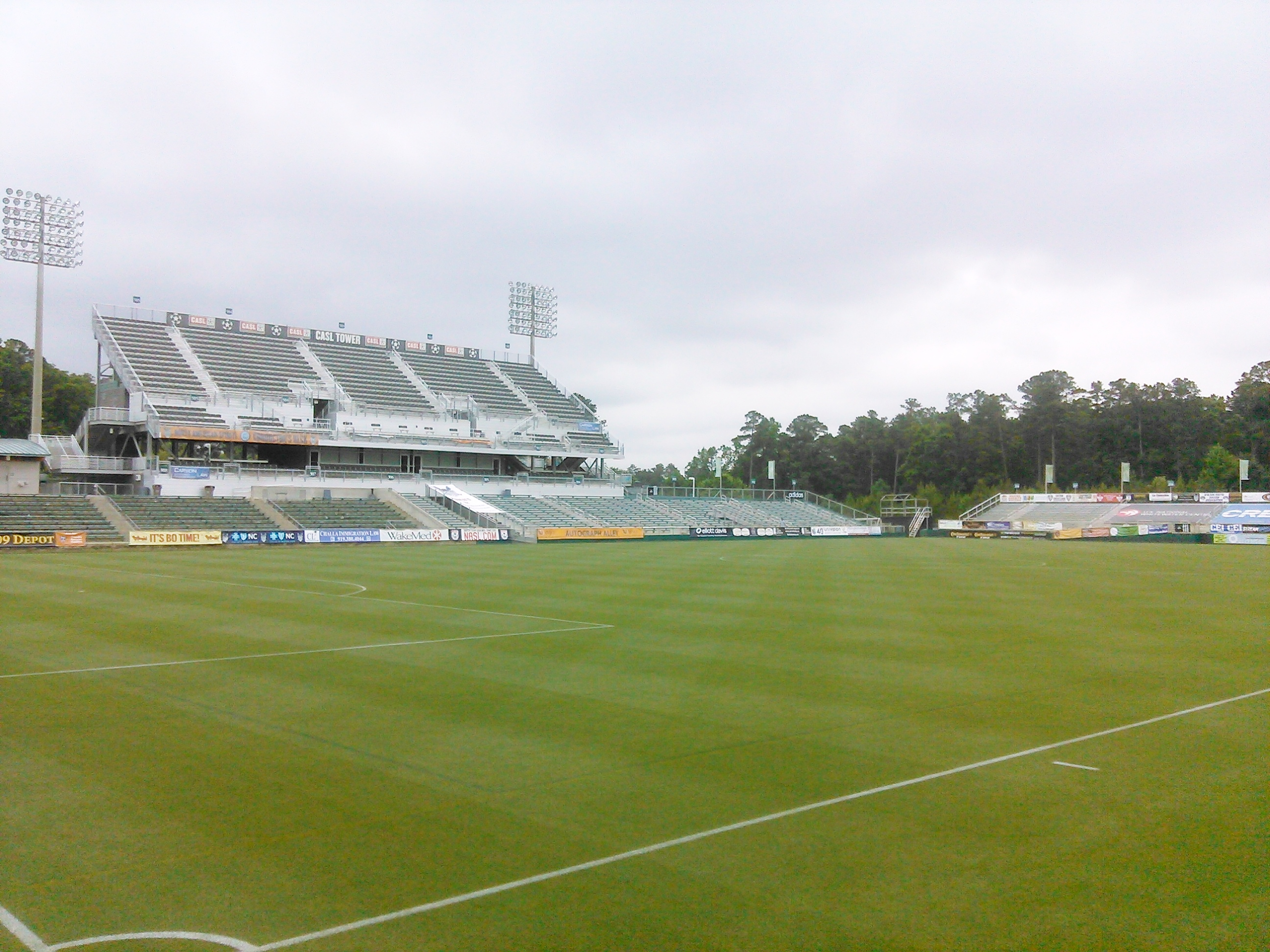
- WakeMed Soccer Park hosted the final
- Event: 2025 NCAA Division I men's soccer tournament
Washington	NC State
Big Ten	ACC
3	2
- After extra time
- Date: December 15, 2025
- Venue: WakeMed Soccer Park, Cary, North Carolina, U.S.
- Referee: Calin Radosav
- Attendance: 10,316

The 2025 NCAA Division I men's soccer championship game (also known as the 2025 NCAA Division I Men's College Cup) was played on December 15, 2025, at WakeMed Soccer Park in Cary, North Carolina. The match determined the winner of the 2025 NCAA Division I men's soccer tournament, the national collegiate soccer championship in the United States. This was the 67th edition of the oldest active competition in United States college soccer.

The match featured the Washington Huskies of the Big Ten Conference and the NC State Wolfpack of the Atlantic Coast Conference (ACC). Both teams entered seeking their first national championship. It was Washington's second appearance in the national final after a loss to Clemson in 2021. NC State made their first appearance in the final following their second College Cup (semifinal) appearance (previously made the semifinals in 1990).

== Road to the final ==
The NCAA Division I men's soccer tournament, sometimes known as the College Cup, is an American intercollegiate soccer tournament conducted by the National Collegiate Athletic Association (NCAA), and determines the Division I men's national champion. The tournament has been formally held since 1959, when it was an eight-team tournament. Since then, the tournament has expanded to 48 teams, where every Division I conference tournament champion is allocated a berth.

Washington (Big Ten)		Round	NC State (ACC)	
Opponent	Result	NCAA Tournament	Opponent	Result
Oregon State (WCC)	3–2 (a.e.t.) (A)	First round	Bye	—N/a
(5) SMU (ACC)	1–0 (A)	Second round	Marshall (SBC)	2–0 (H)
(12) Stanford (ACC)	1–0 (A)	Third round (Sweet 16)	UNCG (SoCon)	2–0 (H)
(4) Maryland (Big Ten)	3–1 (A)	Quarterfinals (Elite 8)	(7) Georgetown (Big East)	3–2 (A)
(16) Furman (SoCon)	3–1 (N)	College Cup (Final 4)	Saint Louis (A-10)	2–1 (N)

=== Washington ===
The Huskies entered the championship game with a 15–6–2 overall record and a 7–3–0 in Big Ten Conference play. Forward Charlie Kosakoff led the Huskies in scoring with 11 goals in 23 matches, while Richie Aman led the Huskies with 13 assists across 23 matches. Washington began the 2025 season unranked, but as the season progressed, Washington ascended to as high as 14th in the United Soccer Coaches, TopDrawer Soccer, and the College Soccer News rankings. The Huskies were one of four Big Ten teams to qualify for the 2025 Big Ten Conference men's soccer tournament. There, the Huskies lost in the semifinal to Michigan, 0–2.

Despite the setback in the Big Ten tournament, the Huskies earned an at-large bid into the NCAA tournament, albeit, they were not one of the 16 teams to be seeded and earn a first-round bye.

=== NC State ===
The Wolfpack entered the championship game with a 16–2–4 overall record and a 4–1–3 in Atlantic Coast Conference play. Forward and Saint Lucian international, Donovan Phillip, led the Wolfpack in scoring with 18 goals in 21 matches, while Riley Maloney led the Huskies with nine assists across 23 matches.

== Match details ==
College Cup
December 15, 2025
7:00 p.m. EST
Final

Washington	3–2 (a.e.t.)	NC State
Zach Ramsey 44'; Joe Dale 62'; Harrison Bertos 92'	NCAA; WS	Donavan Phillip 66'; Taig Healy 87'

WakeMed Soccer Park, Cary
Attendance: 10,316
Referee: Calin Radosav

Washington
NC State

GK	1	(United States) Jadon Bowton
DF	3	(United States) Harrison Bertos
DF	4	(United States) Egor Akulov
DF	5	(United States) Asher Hestad
DF	44	(United States) Gabe Fernandez	(substituted off) 80'
MF	6	(United States) Zach Ramsey	(substituted off) 45' (substituted on) 90'
MF	10	(United States) Richie Aman
MF	14	(United States) Joe Dale	(substituted off) 26' (substituted on) 45' (substituted off) 80'
MF	21	(United States) Osato Enabulele	(substituted off) 40' (substituted on) 80'
MF	26	(United States) Connor Lofy	(substituted off) 90'
FW	9	(United States) Charlie Kosakoff	(substituted off) 40' (substituted on) 45' (substituted off) 86' (substituted on) 90'
Substitutions:
MF	7	(United States) Alex Hall	(substituted on) 26'
FW	11	(United States) Nick O'Brien	(substituted on) 40' (substituted off) 45' (substituted on) 86' (substituted off) 90'
MF	13	(United States) Kevin Hernandez	(substituted on) 40'
DF	16	(United States) Zack Meier	(substituted on) 80'
Manager:
(Scotland) Jamie Clark

GK	1	(United States) Logan Erb
DF	3	(England) Riley Moloney
DF	6	(Canada) Nikola Markovic
DF	13	(South Africa) Calem Tommy
DF	18	(United States) Isaac Heffess
MF	4	(United States) Carlos Santamaria
MF	22	(United States) Drew Lovelace	(substituted off) 35' (substituted on) 45' (substituted off) 75'
MF	8	(United States) Justin Mclean
MF	10	(United States) Taig Healy
FW	7	(Saint Lucia) Donavan Phillip	(substituted off) 45' (substituted on) 60'
FW	9	(Canada) Ibrahim Conde	(substituted off) 35' (substituted on) 45'
Substitutions:
MF	17	(United States) Caden Tolentino	(substituted on) 35' (substituted off) 45'
MF	15	(United States) Aidan Payne	(substituted on) 35' (substituted off) 45' (substituted on) 75'
FW	11	(United States) Frankie DeFrancesco	(substituted on) 45' (substituted off) 60'
Manager:
(United States) Marc Hubbard
