= 2025 NCAA Division I men's soccer rankings =

- Season: 2025
- NCAA Tournament: 2025
- Preseason No. 1: Vermont (USC); Marshall (CSN)
- NCAA Tournament Champions: Washington
NCAA Division I men's soccer rankings
← 2024

Three major human polls made up the 2025 NCAA Division I men's soccer rankings: United Soccer Coaches, Top Drawer Soccer, and College Soccer News.

== Legend ==
	Increase in ranking
	Decrease in ranking
	New to rankings from previous week
Italics	Number of first place votes
(#–#)	Win-loss record
т	Tied with team above or below also with this symbol

== United Soccer Coaches ==
	Preseason Jul 31	Week 1 Aug 26	Week 2 Sep 2	Week 3 Sep 9	Week 4 Sep 16	Week 5 Sep 23	Week 6 Sep 30	Week 7 Oct 7	Week 8 Oct 14	Week 9 Oct 21	Week 10 Oct 28	Week 11 Nov 4	Week 12 Nov 11	Final Dec 16	
1.	Vermont (4)	Vermont (2–0–0) (8)	Stanford (4–0–0) (8)	Indiana (5–0–1) (7)	Wake Forest (4–0–2) (6)	NC State (7–0–1)	Portland (6–0–1) (8)	Stanford (10–1–1) (8)	Stanford (11–1–1) (8)	Stanford (11–1–1) (8)	Stanford (12–1–2) (8)	Maryland (11–0–3) (8)	Maryland (12–0–3) (8)	Washington (16–6–2) (6)	1.
2.	Marshall (3)	Marshall (1–0–0)	Marshall (1–0–1)	Clemson (3–0–1)	NC State (5–0–1)	Portland (5–0–1)	NC State (7–0–2)	Vermont (8–0–3)	Bryant (11–0–1)	Bryant (13–0–1)	Maryland (10–0–3)	Vermont (11–0–5)	Vermont (12–0–5)	NC State (16–3–4)	2.
3.	Ohio State (1)	Pittsburgh (1–0–0)	Clemson (2–0–1)	Akron (4–0–1)	Stanford (6–1–0)	Indiana (6–1–1)	Stanford (9–1–1)	Bryant (10–0–1)	West Virginia (8–1–2)	NC State (10–1–2)	Vermont (10–0–5)	Princeton (12–1–2)	Princeton (13–1–2)	Furman (16–2–5) (1)	3.
4.	Denver	Stanford (2–0–0)	Indiana (3–0–1)	Wake Forest (3–0–1) (1)	Portland (4–0–1) (1)	Marshall (3–0–3)	Vermont (7–0–3)	West Virginia (7–1–2)	Portland (8–0–2)	Maryland (9–0–3)	NC State (11–1–3)	Virginia (10–1–4)	Virginia (11–1–4)	Saint Louis (13–3–8) (1)	4.
5.	SMU	Wake Forest (1–0–0)	NC State (3–0–0)	NC State (3–0–1)	Indiana (5–1–1) (1)	Michigan (5–0–2)	Bryant (9–0–1)	High Point (7–0–3)	Princeton (9–1–0)	Portland (9–0–3)	Princeton (11–1–2)	NC State (11–1–4)	Bryant (15–1–2)	Georgetown (14–4–4)	5.
6.	Wake Forest	Clemson (0–0–1)	West Virginia (2–0–1)	Louisville (4–0–0)	Marshall (2–0–3)	Stanford (7–1–1)	Georgia Southern (8–0–1)	Portland (7–0–2)	NC State (9–1–2)	Princeton (10–1–1)	Virginia (9–1–4)	Bryant (14–1–2)	Portland (11–1–3)	Portland (14–2–4)	6.
7.	Pittsburgh	Indiana (1–0–1)	Wake Forest (2–0–1)	Gardner-Webb (5–0–0)	Saint Louis (3–1–2)	Vermont (6–0–3)	High Point (6–0–3)	Duke (7–0–3)	Vermont (8–0–5)	Vermont (9–0–5)	Bryant (13–1–2)	Stanford (12–2–2)	San Diego (12–2–3)	Maryland (13–2–4)	7.
8.	UMass	NC State (2–0–0)	Virginia Tech (2–0–1)	Stanford (4–1–0)	Michigan (4–0–2)	Saint Louis (4–1–3)	West Virginia (6–1–2)	Virginia (7–1–2)	Maryland (7–0–3)	High Point (9–1–3)	High Point (10–1–3)	Portland (10–1–3)	Stanford (13–3–2)	Princeton (15–2–2)	8.
9.	Clemson	Duke (2–0–0)	Vermont (2–0–2)	Portland (4–0–0)	Vermont (4–0–3)	High Point (5–0–2)	Duke (5–0–3)	Princeton (8–1–0)	Virginia (7–1–3)	Marshall (7–1–4)	Portland (9–1–3)	San Diego (11–2–3)	High Point (12–1–4)	Stanford (14–4–2)	9.
10.	San Diego	West Virginia (2–0–0)	Pittsburgh (2–1–0)	Marshall (1–0–2)	Akron (5–1–1)	West Virginia (5–1–1)	UNC Greensboro (6–1–1)	NC State (8–1–2)	Duke (7–0–5)	West Virginia (9–2–2)	San Diego (10–2–3)	Michigan (11–2–3)	Oregon State (10–3–2)	Bryant (17–2–3)	10.
11.	Indiana	Virginia (2–0–0)	Akron (2–0–1)	UNC Greensboro (4–0–1)	High Point (4–0–2)	San Diego (6–1–2)	Michigan (5–1–2)	Georgia Southern (8–1–1)	High Point (8–1–3)	Virginia (8–1–4)	Marshall (8–1–5)	Georgetown (10–3–3)	NC State (12–2–4)	Virginia (12–2–5)	11.
12.	Dayton	Virginia Tech (2–0–0)	UNC Greensboro (3–0–1)	High Point (3–0–1)	Louisville (5–1–0)	Virginia (5–1–1)	Indiana (7–2–1)	San Diego (7–1–3)	Marshall (5–1–4)	San Diego (9–2–3)	Michigan (9–2–3)	High Point (11–1–4)	Marshall (10–2–5)т	Akron (13–5–3)	12.
13.	Stanford	High Point (2–0–0)	Gardner-Webb (3–0–0)	Vermont (3–0–2)	West Virginia (4–1–1)	Wake Forest (4–1–3)	Princeton (6–1–0)	Michigan (6–1–3)	Rutgers (8–2–2)	Michigan (8–2–3)	Georgetown (9–3–3)	Oregon State (9–3–2)	Furman (12–1–4)т	Vermont (14–1–5)	13.
14.	NC State	Oregon State (2–0–0)	Duke (2–0–1)	Virginia Tech (2–0–2)	Clemson (3–1–2)	Bryant (7–0–1)	Georgetown (6–2–2)	Georgetown (6–2–3)	Indiana (8–3–1)	Indiana (10–3–1)	Washington (10–3–2)	Furman (11–1–4)	Akron (11–3–3)	UNC Greensboro (12–5–6)	14.
15.	Duke	North Carolina (2–0–0)	High Point (2–0–1)	West Virginia (3–1–1)	Furman (3–0–3)	Gardner-Webb (7–1–0)	San Diego (6–1–3)	Maryland (6–0–3)	San Diego (7–2–3)	Georgetown (8–3–3)	Oregon State (8–3–2)	Washington (10–4–2)	Georgetown (10–3–4)	SMU (11–5–4)	15.
16.	West Virginia	Akron (2–0–0)	Saint Louis (2–0–1)	Utah Valley (5–0–0)	Utah Valley (6–0–0)	Duke (3–0–3)	Virginia (5–1–2)	Oregon State (6–3–0)	Michigan (6–2–3)	Saint Louis (8–2–4)	Furman (10–1–4)	West Virginia (11–3–2)	Michigan (11–2–4)	High Point (14–2–4)	16.
17.	Virginia	California (2–0–0)	Kentucky (2–0–1)	Bryant (4–0–1)	Bryant (5–0–1)	UNC Greensboro (5–1–1)	Marist (6–0–2)	Marshall (4–1–4)	North Carolina (7–1–4)	Washington (8–3–2)	Indiana (11–4–1)	Marshall (8–2–5)	West Virginia (12–3–3)	Marshall (12–4–5)	17.
18.	Kansas City	Kentucky (1–0–0)	Utah Valley (4–0–0)	Kentucky (2–0–1)	Gardner-Webb (5–1–0)	Kentucky (4–0–2)	Maryland (6–0–2)	Rutgers (7–2–2)	Georgetown (7–3–3)	UNC Greensboro (9–2–3)	Kentucky (9–2–3)	Kentucky (10–2–3)	UNC Greensboro (12–3–4)	San Diego (13–3–3)	18.
19.	Penn	Kansas City (0–0–1)	Florida Atlantic (3–0–0)	Duke (2–0–2)	Duke (2–0–3)	Georgia Southern (6–0–1)	Akron (7–2–1)т	Kentucky (6–0–3)	UNC Greensboro (8–2–2)	Duke (7–1–5)	West Virginia (10–3–2)	Akron (10–3–3)	Kentucky (10–2–5)	Oregon State (10–5–2)	19.
20.	Western Michigan	Gardner-Webb (2–0–0)	UMass (3–0–1)	San Francisco (4–1–0)	UC Irvine (4–0–1)	Marist (5–0–2)	Oregon State (5–3–0)т	Indiana (7–3–1)	Saint Louis (7–2–4)	Georgia Southern (10–2–1)	Akron (9–3–3)	UNC Greensboro (10–3–4)	Cornell (12–2–2)	Hofstra (14–5–1)	20.
21.	Akron	Denver (1–1–0)	Penn (1–0–0)	North Carolina (3–1–1)	UNC Greensboro (4–1–1)	Notre Dame (4–1–2)	Saint Louis (5–2–3)	Seton Hall (4–2–4)	Washington (7–3–2)	Oregon State (7–3–2)	Seton Hall (7–2–6)	Seton Hall (7–2–7)	Kansas City (11–2–5)	Grand Canyon (14–4–5)	21.
22.	Cornell	Florida Atlantic (2–0–0)	South Florida (2–0–2)	UC Irvine (2–0–1)	Kentucky (3–0–2)	Connecticut (6–0–3)	Marshall (3–1–4)	Washington (7–3–2)	Florida Atlantic (9–2–0)	North Carolina (8–2–4)	Saint Louis (8–2–5)	Hofstra (12–4–0)	Saint Louis (9–2–6)	Indiana (12–6–1)	22.
23.	Hofstra	UNC Greensboro (2–0–0)т	George Mason (1–1–0)	Cornell (2–0–0)	San Diego (4–1–2)	Maryland (5–0–1)	Notre Dame (5–2–2)	UNC Greensboro (6–2–2)	Oregon State (6–3–1)	Akron (8–3–3)	UNC Greensboro (9–3–4)	Cornell (11–2–2)	Washington (10–5–2)	West Virginia (13–5–3)	23.
24.	Missouri State	Missouri State (1–0–0)т	Portland (2–0–0)	Saint Louis (3–1–1)	Cornell (3–1–0)	Bucknell (4–1–2)	Kentucky (5–0–3)	George Mason (5–3–1)	Georgia Southern (8–2–1)	Charlotte (7–3–2)	Cornell (11–2–1)	Saint Louis (8–2–6)	Indiana (12–5–1)	Connecticut (12–5–4)	24.
25.	Georgetown	Dayton (1–0–1)	Michigan (3–0–1)	San Diego (3–1–1)	Georgia Southern (5–0–1)	George Mason (3–2–1)	Furman (4–1–3)	SMU (5–2–3)	Kentucky (6–1–3)	California Baptist (7–2–3)т; Kentucky (7–2–3)т	Hofstra (11–4–0)	Kansas City (10–2–4)т; Indiana (11–5–1)т	SMU (9–4–4)	Kansas City (12–4–5)	25.
	Preseason Jul 31	Week 1 Aug 26	Week 2 Sep 2	Week 3 Sep 9	Week 4 Sep 16	Week 5 Sep 23	Week 6 Sep 30	Week 7 Oct 7	Week 8 Oct 14	Week 9 Oct 21	Week 10 Oct 28	Week 11 Nov 4	Week 12 Nov 11	Final Dec 16	
		Dropped: No. 3 Ohio State; No. 5 SMU; No. 8 UMass; No. 10 San Diego; No. 19 Penn; No. 20 Western Michigan; No. 22 Cornell; No. 23 Hofstra; No. 25 Georgetown	Dropped: No. 11 Virginia; No. 14 Oregon State; No. 15 North Carolina; No. 17 California; No. 19 Kansas City; No. 21 Denver; No. 24 Missouri State; No. 25 Dayton	Dropped: No. 10 Pittsburgh; No. 19 Florida Atlantic; No. 20 UMass; No. 21 Penn; No. 22 South Florida; No. 23 George Mason; No. 25 Michigan	Dropped: No. 14 Virginia Tech; No. 20 San Francisco; No. 21 North Carolina	Dropped: No. 10 Akron; No. 12 Louisville; No. 14 Clemson; No. 15 Furman; No. 16 Utah Valley; No. 20 UC Irvine; No. 24 Cornell	Dropped: No. 13 Wake Forest; No. 15 Gardner-Webb; No. 22 Connecticut; No. 24 Bucknell; No. 25 George Mason	Dropped: No. 17 Marist; No. 19т Akron; No. 21 Saint Louis; No. 23 Notre Dame; No. 25 Furman	Dropped: No. 21 Seton Hall; No. 24 George Mason; No. 25 SMU	Dropped: No. 13 Rutgers; No. 22 Florida Atlantic	Dropped: No. 19 Duke; No. 20 Georgia Southern; No. 22 North Carolina; No. 24 Charlotte; No. 25т California Baptist	Dropped: None	Dropped: No. 21 Seton Hall; No. 22 Hofstra	Dropped: No. 16 Michigan; No. 19 Kentucky; No. 20 Cornell	

== Top Drawer Soccer ==
	Preseason Aug 18	Week 1 Aug 24	Week 2 Sep 1	Week 3 Sep 8	Week 4 Sep 15	Week 5 Sep 22	Week 6 Sep 29	Week 7 Oct 6	Week 8 Oct 13	Week 9 Oct 20	Week 10 Oct 27	Week 11 Nov 3	Week 12 Nov 10	Week 13 Nov 17	Week 14 Nov 24	Week 15 Dec 1	Final Dec 16	
1.	Vermont	Vermont (2–0–0)	Stanford (4–0–0)	Clemson (3–0–1)	Wake Forest (4–0–2)	NC State (7–0–1)	NC State (7–0–2)	Vermont (8–0–3)	Bryant (11–0–1)	Bryant (13–0–1)	Maryland (10–0–3)	Maryland (11–0–3)	Maryland (12–0–3)	Vermont (14–0–5)	Furman (15–1–4)	Furman (15–1–5)	Washington (16–6–2)	1.
2.	Wake Forest	Wake Forest (1–0–0)	Clemson (2–0–1)	Indiana (5–0–1)	NC State (5–0–1)	Marshall (3–0–3)	Stanford (9–1–1)	Stanford (10–1–1)	Virginia (7–1–3)	Stanford (11–1–1)	Virginia (9–1–4)	Virginia (10–1–4)	Virginia (11–1–4)	Furman (14–1–4)	High Point (14–1–4)	Maryland (13–1–4)	NC State (16–3–4)	2.
3.	Denver	Stanford (2–0–0)	Indiana (4–0–1)	Wake Forest (3–0–1)	Furman (4–0–3)	Virginia (5–1–1)	Portland (7–0–1)	Virginia (7–1–2)	NC State (9–1–2)	NC State (10–1–2)	Vermont (10–0–5)	Vermont (11–0–5)	Vermont (12–0–5)	San Diego (13–2–3)	Bryant (17–2–2)	Portland (14–1–4)	Furman (16–2–5)	3.
4.	Ohio State	Pittsburgh (1–0–0)	Marshall (1–0–2)	Louisville (4–0–0)	Stanford (6–1–0)	Michigan (5–0–2)	Vermont (7–0–3)	Bryant (10–0–1)	Duke (7–0–5)	Maryland (9–0–3)	NC State (11–1–3)	Bryant (14–1–2)	Bryant (15–1–2)	Princeton (15–1–2)	Maryland (12–1–4)	Georgetown (14–3–4)	Saint Louis (13–3–8)	4.
5.	Pittsburgh	Marshall (1–0–0)	Vermont (2–0–2)	Virginia Tech (2–0–2)	Marshall (2–0–3)	Indiana (6–1–1)	Georgia Southern (8–0–1)	NC State (8–1–2)	Portland (9–0–2)	Virginia (8–1–4)	Stanford (12–1–2)	Furman (12–1–4)	Furman (13–1–4)	High Point (13–1–4)	Portland (13–1–4)	NC State (14–2–4)	Maryland (13–2–4)	5.
6.	Marshall	Denver (1–1–0)	Wake Forest (3–0–1)	Marshall (1–0–2)	Clemson (3–1–2)	Stanford (7–1–1)	Bryant (9–0–1)	Duke (7–0–3)	Stanford (11–1–1)	Vermont (9–0–5)	Bryant (13–1–2)	NC State (11–1–4)	San Diego (12–2–3)	Bryant (16–2–2)	Georgetown (13–3–4)	Saint Louis (12–2–8)	Portland (14–2–4)	6.
7.	SMU	Clemson (0–0–1)	Virginia Tech (2–0–2)	Stanford (4–1–0)	Virginia (4–1–1)	Wake Forest (4–1–3)	Furman (5–1–3)	Portland (8–0–2)	Vermont (8–0–5)	Marshall (7–1–4)	Furman (11–1–4)	San Diego (11–2–3)	Princeton (13–1–2)	Maryland (12–1–3)	NC State (13–2–4)	Washington (13–6–2)	Georgetown (14–4–4)	7.
8.	Dayton	Duke (2–0–0)	Duke (2–0–2)	Gardner-Webb (5–0–0)	Michigan (4–0–2)	Portland (6–0–1)	Virginia (5–1–2)	West Virginia (7–1–2)	West Virginia (8–1–2)	Furman (9–1–4)	High Point (10–1–3)	Princeton (12–1–2)	Michigan (11–2–4)	SMU (11–4–4)	Hofstra (14–5–0)	Akron (13–4–3)	Akron (13–5–3)	8.
9.	San Diego	West Virginia (1–0–0)	Furman (3–0–2)	Furman (3–0–2)	Indiana (5–1–1)	Vermont (6–0–3)	Duke (5–0–3)	Clemson (6–2–2)	Marshall (5–1–4)	Portland (10–0–3)	San Diego (10–2–3)	Michigan (11–2–3)	High Point (12–1–4)	Virginia (12–2–4)	Stanford (14–3–2)	High Point (14–2–4)	High Point (14–2–4)	9.
10.	Stanford	Indiana (1–0–1)	Cornell (2–0–0)	Vermont (3–0–2)	Portland (5–0–1)	Furman (4–1–3)	Clemson (5–2–2)	Georgia Southern (8–1–1)	Princeton (9–1–0)	Clemson (7–3–2)	Princeton (11–1–2)	High Point (11–1–4)	Portland (12–1–3)	Portland (13–1–3)	UNC Greensboro (12–4–6)	Bryant (17–2–3)	Bryant (17–2–3)	10.
11.	Clemson	Virginia (2–0–0)	NC State (3–0–1)	Duke (2–0–2)	Vermont (4–0–3)	Bryant (7–0–1)	Marshall (3–1–4)	Marshall (4–1–4)	Furman (8–1–4)	High Point (9–1–3)	Michigan (9–2–3)	Stanford (12–2–2)	Oregon State (10–3–2)	Georgetown (12–3–4)	Saint Louis (12–2–7)	Hofstra (14–5–1)	Hofstra (14–5–1)	11.
12.	Cornell	Cornell (0–0–0)	Pittsburgh (2–1–0)	Portland (5–0–0)	Louisville (5–1–0)	Gardner-Webb (7–1–0)	Michigan (5–1–2)	High Point (7–0–3)	Maryland (7–0–3)	San Diego (9–2–3)	Marshall (8–1–5)	Portland (11–1–3)	NC State (12–2–4)	Oregon State (10–4–2)	Washington (12–6–2)	Stanford (14–4–2)	Stanford (14–4–2)	12.
13.	Kansas City	NC State (2–0–0)	San Diego (3–1–1)	Cornell (2–0–0)	Akron (5–1–1)	West Virginia (5–1–1)	Indiana (7–2–1)	Cornell (7–1–0)	Clemson (6–3–2)	West Virginia (9–2–2)	Cornell (11–2–1)	Georgetown (10–3–3)	West Virginia (12–3–3)	NC State (12–2–4)	Connecticut (12–4–4)	UNC Greensboro (12–5–6)	UNC Greensboro (12–5–6)	13.
14.	Georgetown	Dayton (1–0–1)	West Virginia (2–1–1)	Akron (4–0–1)	Bryant (5–0–1)	San Diego (6–1–2)	Wake Forest (5–2–3)	San Diego (7–1–3)	High Point (8–1–3)	Princeton (10–1–1)	Washington (10–3–2)	Oregon State (9–3–2)	Georgetown (10–3–4)	UCLA (8–6–4)	Akron (12–4–3)	Connecticut (12–5–4)	Connecticut (12–5–6)	14.
15.	Duke	Kansas City (0–0–1)	Denver (2–3–0)	NC State (3–0–1)	Gardner-Webb (5–1–0)	San Francisco (5–1–1)	West Virginia (6–1–2)	Princeton (8–1–0)	San Diego (7–2–3)	Duke (7–1–5)	Portland (10–1–3)	West Virginia (11–3–2)	SMU (9–4–4)	Cornell (13–3–2)	Duke (10–3–6)	Duke (10–4–6)	Duke (10–4–6)	15.
16.	West Virginia	Virginia Tech (2–0–0)	Ohio State (2–2–0)	San Diego (3–1–1)	West Virginia (4–1–1)	Duke (3–0–3)	High Point (6–0–3)	Furman (6–1–4)	Rutgers (8–2–2)	Michigan (8–2–3)	Georgetown (9–3–3)	Washington (10–4–2)	Cornell (12–2–2)	Michigan (12–3–4)	Grand Canyon (13–3–5)	Grand Canyon (13–4–5)	Grand Canyon (13–4–5)	16.
17.	Virginia	Ohio State (0–1–0)	Akron (4–0–1)	San Francisco (4–1–0)	Virginia Tech (2–1–3)	Clemson (4–2–2)	Maryland (6–0–2)	Michigan (6–1–3)	Michigan (6–2–3)	Georgia Southern (10–2–1)	Oregon State (8–3–2)	Cornell (11–2–2)	Marshall (10–2–5)	Marshall (11–3–5)	Vermont (14–1–5)	Vermont (14–1–5)	Vermont (14–1–5)	17.
18.	Indiana	Saint Louis (1–0–1)	Saint Louis (2–1–1)	SMU (3–2–1)	San Diego (4–1–2)	Connecticut (6–0–3)	Georgetown (6–2–2)	Rutgers (7–2–2)	Georgia Southern (8–2–1)	UNC Greensboro (9–2–3)	Clemson (8–4–2)	Marshall (8–2–5)	Stanford (13–3–2)	West Virginia (12–4–3)	San Diego (13–3–3)	San Diego (13–3–3)	San Diego (13–3–3)	18.
19.	NC State	SMU (0–1–1)	Kansas City (2–1–2)	UNC Greensboro (4–0–1)	Saint Louis (3–1–2)	High Point (5–0–2)	Cornell (5–1–0)	Maryland (6–0–3)	Cornell (7–2–1)	Cornell (9–2–1)	West Virginia (10–3–2)	UNC Greensboro (10–3–4)	UNC Greensboro (12–3–4)	Stanford (13–3–2)	Princeton (15–2–2)	Princeton (15–2–2)	Princeton (15–2–2)	19.
20.	Furman	Furman (1–0–1)	SMU (3–1–1)	West Virginia (3–1–1)	San Francisco (4–1–1)	Cornell (4–1–0)	Akron (7–2–1)	Georgetown (6–2–3)	Washington (7–3–2)	Washington (8–3–2)	Seton Hall (7–2–6)	Hofstra (12–4–0)	Syracuse (9–6–3)	UCF (10–6–3)	SMU (11–5–4)	SMU (11–5–4)	SMU (11–5–4)	20.
21.	Penn	Penn (0–0–0)	Penn (1–0–1)	Pittsburgh (3–2–0)	Duke (2–0–3)	Saint Louis (4–1–3)	San Diego (6–1–3)	Washington (7–3–2)	Indiana (8–3–1)	Indiana (9–3–1)	UNC Greensboro (9–3–4)	Kentucky (10–2–3)	Washington (10–5–2)	UNC Greensboro (12–4–4)	Virginia (12–2–5)	Virginia (12–2–5)	Virginia (12–2–5)	21.
22.	Missouri State	Missouri State (1–0–0)	UNC Greensboro (3–0–1)	Saint Louis (3–1–1)	Utah Valley (5–0–0)	Louisville (5–2–0)	Kentucky (5–0–3)	Kentucky (6–0–3)	North Carolina (7–1–4)	Georgetown (8–3–3)	Hofstra (11–4–0)	Kansas City (10–2–4)	Kentucky (10–2–5)	Florida Atlantic (11–3–2)	Cornell (14–4–2)	Cornell (14–4–2)	Cornell (14–4–2)	22.
23.	UNC Greensboro	UNC Greensboro (2–0–0)	George Mason (2–1–0)	George Mason (2–2–0)	High Point (4–0–2)	Akron (5–2–1)	Gardner-Webb (8–1–1)	Gardner-Webb (9–1–1)	UNC Greensboro (8–2–2)	Oregon State (7–3–2)	Indiana (11–4–1)	Seton Hall (7–2–7)	Kansas City (11–2–5)	Saint Louis (10–2–7)	Marshall (12–4–5)	Marshall (12–4–5)	Marshall (12–4–5)	23.
24.	High Point	High Point (1–0–0)	Virginia (3–1–1)	Virginia (3–1–1)	Cornell (3–1–0)	Maryland (5–0–1)	Saint Louis (5–2–3)	Delaware (9–0–1)	Georgetown (7–3–3)	Saint Louis (8–2–4)	Kentucky (9–2–3)	Akron (10–3–3)	Akron (11–3–3)	Washington (10–6–2)	West Virginia (13–5–3)	West Virginia (13–5–3)	West Virginia (13–5–3)	24.
25.	Western Michigan	San Diego (0–1–1)	South Florida (2–0–3)	Utah Valley (5–0–0)	Maryland (4–0–1)	Utah Valley (6–0–1)	Utah Valley (6–0–1)	Indiana (7–3–1)	Kentucky (6–1–3)	North Carolina (8–2–4)	Saint Louis (8–2–5)	Georgia Southern (12–3–1)	Hofstra (12–5–0)	Hofstra (12–5–0)	UCF (11–7–3)	UCF (11–7–3)	UCF (11–7–3)	25.
	Preseason Aug 18	Week 1 Aug 24	Week 2 Sep 1	Week 3 Sep 8	Week 4 Sep 15	Week 5 Sep 22	Week 6 Sep 29	Week 7 Oct 6	Week 8 Oct 13	Week 9 Oct 20	Week 10 Oct 27	Week 11 Nov 3	Week 12 Nov 10	Week 13 Nov 17	Week 14 Nov 24	Week 15 Dec 1	Final Dec 16	
		Dropped: No. 14 Georgetown; No. 25 Western Michigan	Dropped: No. 14 Dayton; No. 22 Missouri State; No. 24 High Point	Dropped: No. 15 Denver; No. 16 Ohio State; No. 19 Kansas City; No. 21 Penn; No. 25 South Florida	Dropped: No. 18 SMU; No. 19 UNC Greensboro; No. 21 Pittsburgh; No. 23 George Mason	Dropped: No. 17 Virginia Tech	Dropped: No. 15 San Francisco; No. 18 Connecticut; No. 22 Louisville	Dropped: No. 14 Wake Forest; No. 20 Akron; No. 24 Saint Louis; No. 25 Utah Valley	Dropped: No. 23 Gardner-Webb; No. 24 Delaware	Dropped: No. 16 Rutgers; No. 25 Kentucky	Dropped: No. 15 Duke; No. 17 Georgia Southern; No. 25 North Carolina	Dropped: No. 18 Clemson; No. 23 Indiana; No. 25 Saint Louis	Dropped: No. 23 Seton Hall; No. 25 Georgia Southern	Dropped: No. 20 Syracuse; No. 22 Kentucky; No. 23 Kansas City; No. 24 Akron	Dropped: No. 12 Oregon State; No. 14 UCLA; No. 16 Michigan; No. 22 Florida Atlantic	None	None	

== College Soccer News ==
	Preseason Aug 11	Week 1 Aug 26	Week 2 Sep 2	Week 3 Sep 8	Week 4 Sep 15	Week 5 Sep 22	Week 6 Sep 29	Week 7 Oct 6	Week 8 Oct 13	Week 9 Oct 20	Week 10 Oct 27	Week 11 Nov 3	Week 12 Nov 10	Final Nov 18	
1.	Marshall	Marshall (1–0–0)	Marshall (1–0–1)	Clemson (3–0–1)	NC State (5–0–1)	NC State (7–0–1)	NC State (7–0–2)	Vermont (8–0–3)	Stanford (11–1–1)	Stanford (11–1–1)	Stanford (12–1–2)	Vermont (11–0–5)	Maryland (12–0–3)	Vermont (14–0–5)	1.
2.	Vermont	Vermont (2–0–0)	Stanford (4–0–0)	Indiana (5–0–1)	Marshall (2–0–3)	Vermont (6–0–3)	Vermont (7–0–3)	Stanford (10–1–1)	Portland (9–0–2)	Portland (10–0–3)	Vermont (10–0–5)	Maryland (11–0–3)	Vermont (12–0–5)	Princeton (15–1–2)	2.
3.	Denver	Pittsburgh (1–0–0)	Vermont (2–0–2)	Marshall (1–0–2)	Indiana (5–1–1)	Marshall (3–0–3)	Stanford (9–1–1)	NC State (8–1–2)	Vermont (8–0–5)	Bryant (13–0–1)	NC State (11–1–3)	Virginia (10–1–4)	Virginia (11–1–4)	Virginia (12–2–4)	3.
4.	Wake Forest	Wake Forest (1–0–0)	Clemson (2–0–1)	Stanford (4–1–0)	Vermont (4–0–3)	Indiana (6–1–1)	Portland (7–0–1)	Portland (8–0–2)	NC State (9–1–2)	NC State (10–1–2)	Maryland (10–0–3)	Princeton (12–1–2)	Princeton (13–1–2)	Maryland (12–1–3)	4.
5.	Pittsburgh	Denver (1–1–0)	Indiana (4–0–1)	Vermont (3–0–2)	Wake Forest (4–0–2)	Stanford (7–1–1)	Indiana (7–2–1)	Bryant (10–0–1)	Bryant (11–0–1)	Vermont (9–0–5)	Virginia (9–1–4)	NC State (11–1–4)	Portland (12–1–3)	San Diego (13–2–3)	5.
6.	SMU	Stanford (2–0–0)	Wake Forest (2–0–1)	Wake Forest (3–0–1)	Clemson (3–1–2)	Portland (6–0–1)	Maryland (6–0–2)	Virginia (7–1–2)	Virginia (7–1–3)	Virginia (8–1–4)	Princeton (11–1–2)	Stanford (12–2–2)	San Diego (12–2–3)	Portland (13–1–3)	6.
7.	Clemson	Clemson (0–0–1)	Pittsburgh (2–2–0)	NC State (3–0–1)	Stanford (6–1–0)	Michigan (5–0–2)	West Virginia (6–1–2)	West Virginia (7–1–2)	West Virginia (8–1–2)	Maryland (9–0–3)	Portland (10–1–3)	Portland (11–1–3)	NC State (12–2–4)	High Point (13–1–4)	7.
8.	Georgetown	West Virginia (1–0–0)	NC State (3–0–0)	Akron (4–0–1)	Akron (5–1–1)	Clemson (4–2–2)	Marshall (3–1–4)	High Point (7–0–3)	Maryland (7–0–3)	Princeton (10–1–1)	Bryant (13–1–2)	San Diego (11–2–3)	Stanford (13–3–2)	Bryant (16–2–2)	8.
9.	Ohio State	Indiana (1–0–1)	West Virginia (2–1–1)	Pittsburgh (3–2–0)	Furman (4–0–3)	Maryland (5–0–1)	High Point (6–0–3)	Maryland (6–0–3)	High Point (8–1–3)	High Point (9–1–3)	High Point (10–1–3)	Bryant (14–1–2)	Bryant (15–1–2)	Stanford (13–3–2)	9.
10.	Stanford	Duke (2–0–0)	Duke (2–0–1)	Duke (2–0–2)	Portland (5–0–1)	Saint Louis (4–1–3)	Michigan (5–1–2)	Duke (7–0–3)	Princeton (9–1–0)	West Virginia (9–2–2)	San Diego (10–2–3)	High Point (11–1–4)	High Point (12–1–4)	NC State (12–2–4)	10.
11.	West Virginia	SMU (0–1–1)	Virginia Tech (2–0–1)	West Virginia (3–1–1)	Saint Louis (3–1–2)	Wake Forest (4–1–3)	Bryant (9–0–1)	Indiana (7–3–1)	Duke (7–0–5)	Marshall (7–1–4)	Marshall (8–1–5)	Georgetown (10–3–3)	Oregon State (10–3–2)	Georgetown (12–3–4)	11.
12.	Indiana	NC State (2–0–0)	Akron (3–0–1)	Virginia Tech (2–0–2)	Maryland (4–0–1)	Akron (5–2–1)	Virginia (5–1–2)	Marshall (4–1–4)	Marshall (5–1–4)	Indiana (9–3–1)	Georgetown (9–3–3)	Oregon State (9–3–2)	Georgetown (10–3–4)	Furman (14–1–4)	12.
13.	Duke	Ohio State (0–1–0)	Denver (2–2–0)	Cornell (2–0–0)	West Virginia (4–1–1)	High Point (5–0–2)	Duke (5–0–3)	San Diego (7–1–3)	Indiana (8–3–1)	San Diego (9–2–3)	Indiana (11–4–1)	Michigan (11–2–3)	Furman (13–1–4)	Oregon State (10–4–2)	13.
14.	Dayton	Dayton (1–0–1)	Cornell (2–0–0)	UNC Greensboro (4–0–1)	High Point (4–0–2)	West Virginia (5–1–1)	Clemson (5–2–2)	Michigan (6–1–3)	San Diego (7–2–3)	Georgetown (8–3–3)	Washington (10–3–2)	West Virginia (11–3–2)	Akron (11–3–3)	SMU (11–4–4)	14.
15.	San Diego	Georgetown (0–2–0)	Saint Louis (2–1–1)	Saint Louis (3–1–1)	Duke (2–0–3)	Furman (4–1–3)	Saint Louis (5–2–3)	Clemson (6–2–2)	Georgetown (7–3–3)	Clemson (7–3–2)	West Virginia (10–3–2)	Furman (12–1–4)	West Virginia (12–3–3)	Akron (11–4–3)	15.
16.	NC State	Kansas City (0–0–1)	Ohio State (2–1–0)	Gardner-Webb (5–0–0)	Gardner-Webb (5–1–0)	Gardner-Webb (7–1–0)	Akron (7–2–1)	Princeton (8–1–0)	Clemson (6–3–2)	Saint Louis (8–2–4)	Saint Louis (8–2–5)	Washington (10–4–2)	Michigan (11–2–4)	Indiana (12–5–1)	16.
17.	Missouri State	Missouri State (1–0–0)	Kansas City (2–0–2)	Maryland (3–0–1)	Louisville (5–1–0)	Duke (3–0–3)	UNC Greensboro (6–1–1)	Georgia Southern (8–1–1)	Michigan (6–2–3)	Duke (7–1–5)	Michigan (9–2–3)	Marshall (8–2–5)	Indiana (12–5–1)	West Virginia (12–4–3)	17.
18.	Hofstra	UMass (1–0–1)	UNC Greensboro (3–0–1)	High Point (3–0–1)	UNC Greensboro (4–1–1)	Byrant (7–0–1)	San Diego (6–1–3)	Saint Louis (5–2–4)	Saint Louis (7–2–4)	Michigan (8–2–3)	Oregon State (8–3–2)	Akron (10–3–3)	Marshall (10–2–5)	Marshall (11–3–5)	18.
19.	UMass	San Diego (0–1–1)	High Point (2–0–1)	Furman (3–0–2)	Cornell (3–1–0)	UNC Greensboro (5–1–1)	Furman (5–1–3)	Cornell (7–1–0)	UNC Greensboro (8–2–2)	UNC Greensboro (9–2–3)	Furman (11–1–4)	Indiana (11–5–1)	Kentucky (10–2–5)	Michigan (12–3–4)	19.
20.	Western Michigan	Virginia (2–0–0)	Maryland (2–0–1)	Penn (1–0–1)	Michigan (4–0–2)	Virginia (5–1–1)	Gardner-Webb (8–1–1)	Georgetown (6–2–3)	North Carolina (7–1–4)	Washington (8–3–2)	Clemson (8–4–2)	Kentucky (10–2–3)	Cornell (12–2–2)	Cornell (13–3–2)	20.
21.	Penn	North Carolina (2–0–0)	Penn (1–0–1)	Louisville (4–0–0)	Virginia Tech (2–1–3)	San Diego (6–1–2)	Cornell (5–1–0)	Gardner-Webb (9–1–1)	Rutgers (8–2–2)	Oregon State (7–3–2)	UNC Greensboro (9–3–4)	Seton Hall (7–2–7)	Washington (10–5–2)	Saint Louis (10–2–7)	21.
22.	Kansas City	Cornell (0–0–0)	Dayton (1–1–2)	Portland (5–0–0)	Pittsburgh (3–3–0)	Cornell (4–1–0)	Georgia Southern (8–0–1)	Akron (7–3–1)	Cornell (7–2–1)	North Carolina (8–2–4)	Akron (9–3–3)	UNC Greensboro (10–3–4)	UNC Greensboro (12–3–4)	UNC Greensboro (12–4–4)	22.
23.	Cornell	Hofstra (1–1–0)	North Carolina (3–1–0)	Kansas City (2–1–2)	San Diego (4–1–2)	Notre Dame (4–1–2)	Wake Forest (5–2–3)	UNC Greensboro (6–2–2)	Akron (8–3–2)	Cornell (9–2–1)	Cornell (11–2–1)	Saint Louis (8–2–6)	Kansas City (11–2–5)	Denver (11–7–2)	23.
24.	UCLA	Penn (0–0–0)	Missouri State (2–1–0)	Denver (2–3–0)	Bryant (5–0–1)	Louisville (5–2–0)	Notre Dame (5–2–2)	Kentucky (6–0–3)	Georgia Southern (8–2–1)	Rutgers (8–4–2)	Duke (7–2–6)	Clemson (8–4–3)	Seton Hall (7–3–7)	Kansas City (11–3–5)	24.
25.	Washington	Maryland (1–0–0)	Furman (3–0–2)	Ohio State (2–2–0)	Virginia (4–1–1)	Connecticut (6–0–3)	Princeton (6–1–0)	Furman (6–1–4)	Washington (7–3–2)	Akron (8–3–3)	Seton Hall (7–2–6)	Cornell (11–2–2)	Saint Louis (9–2–6)	Kentucky (10–3–5)	25.
	Preseason Aug 11	Week 1 Aug 26	Week 2 Sep 2	Week 3 Sep 8	Week 4 Sep 15	Week 5 Sep 22	Week 6 Sep 29	Week 7 Oct 6	Week 8 Oct 13	Week 9 Oct 20	Week 10 Oct 27	Week 11 Nov 3	Week 12 Nov 10	Final Nov 18	
		Dropped: No. 20 Western Michigan; No. 24 UCLA; No. 25 Washington	Dropped: No. 11 SMU; No. 15 Georgetown; No. 18 UMass; No. 19 San Diego; No. 20 Virginia; No. 23 Hofstra	Dropped: No. 22 Dayton; No. 23 North Carolina; No. 24 Missouri State	Dropped: No. 20 Penn; No. 23 Kansas City; No. 24 Denver; No. 25 Ohio State	Dropped: No. 21 Virginia Tech; No. 22 Pittsburgh	Dropped: No. 24 Louisville; No. 25 Connecticut	Dropped: No. 23 Wake Forest; No. 24 Notre Dame	Dropped: No. 21 Gardner-Webb; No. 24 Kentucky; No. 25 Furman	Dropped: No. 24 Georgia Southern	Dropped: No. 22 North Carolina; No. 24 Rutgers	Dropped: No. 24 Duke	Dropped: No. 24 Clemson	Dropped: No. 21 Washington; No. 24 Seton Hall	
