= Andy Fleming (soccer) =

American former college soccer player

Biographical details
- Born: December 27, 1974 (age 51); Boston, Massachusetts
- Education: Marist College

Playing career
- 1994–1997: Marist Red Foxes

Coaching career (HC unless noted)
- 1998–2007: Boston University Terriers (AC)
- 2007–2010: Northwestern Wildcats (AC)
- 2010–2021: Xavier Musketeers

Andy Fleming (born December 27, 1974) is an American former college soccer player and former head coach for Xavier University in the Big East Conference. Fleming has previously served as an assistant coach for Northwestern and Boston University's men's soccer programs.

== Career ==
=== Playing ===
Fleming played eight years of competitive soccer. From 1990 to 1994 he played high school soccer for Archbishop Williams High School. There Fleming was a four-year starter for their varsity soccer program. In 2004, Fleming would be inducted into their high school's Hall of Fame.

After graduating from Archbishop, Fleming earned a scholarship to play college soccer for Marist College. There, Fleming was a four-year letterwinner, and served as team captain his junior and senior seasons.

=== Managerial ===
On December 18, 2009, Fleming was named the head men's soccer coach for Xavier University. Fleming mutually parted ways with Xavier in 2021.

== Head coaching record ==
Season	Team	Overall	Conference	Standing	Postseason
Xavier Musketeers (Atlantic 10 Conference) (2010–2012)
2010	Xavier	10–7–4	5–4–0	6th	A10 Champions; NCAA First Round
2011	Xavier	12–5–4	4–3–2	6th	A10 Champions; NCAA First Round
2012	Xavier	14–3–5	6–1–2	3rd	A10 Semifinals; NCAA Second Round
Xavier (Atlantic 10):		36–15–13 (.664)	15–8–4 (.630)		
Xavier Musketeers (Big East Conference) (2013–present)
2013	Xavier	10–7–2	3–6–0	4th	Big East Quarterfinals
2014	Xavier	15–6–2	7–2–2	2nd	Big East Runners-Up; NCAA Sweet Sixteen
2015	Xavier	12–6–1	5–3–1	4th	Big East Semifinals
2016	Xavier	8–8–3	4–4–1	5th	Big East Semifinals
2017	Xavier	11–6–3	5–4–0	4th	Big East Runners-Up
2018	Xavier	6–7–6	4–4–1	5th	Big East Quarterfinals
2019	Xavier				
Xavier (Big East):		62–40–17 (.592)	28–23–5 (.545)		
Total:		98–55–30 (.617)			
National champion Postseason invitational champion Conference regular season champion Conference regular season and conference tournament champion Division regular season champion Division regular season and conference tournament champion Conference tournament champion
