= Big East Conference men's soccer tournament =

- Sport: College soccer
- Conference: Big East Conference
- Number of teams: 8
- Format: Single-elimination
- Current stadium: Maryland SoccerPlex
- Current location: Boyds, Maryland
- Played: 1982–present
- Last contest: 2026
- Current champion: Akron (1st title)
- Most championships: St. John's (9 titles)
- TV partner(s): BETV, FS2, FS1
- Official website: bigeast.com/msoc

The Big East Conference men's soccer tournament is the conference championship tournament in soccer for the Big East Conference. The single-elimination tournament has been held every year since the Big East Conference realignment in 2013. In 2023, the tournament expanded from six to eight teams, coinciding with the Big East adding Akron as a single-sport member and increasing its men's soccer lineup to 12 teams.

The conference has split into East and Midwest divisions for scheduling purposes, although it will maintain a single league table. Seeding for the tournament is based on regular season conference records. The team with the best overall conference record will earn the top seed; the second seed will be the team from the opposite division with the best conference record.

All remaining seeds will be based on the overall conference table. With the expansion to an eight-team bracket, byes have been eliminated; instead, the top four seeds will host quarterfinal matches, with the survivors advancing to a predetermined site for the semifinals and final. The winner, declared conference champion, receives the conference's automatic bid to the NCAA Division I men's soccer championship.

With nine titles, St. John's has the most Big East tournament championship in the current iteration of the Big East Conference.

== Champions ==
The following is a list of Big East Conference Tournament winners:

=== Finals ===
Key

- (1) – Title number
- a.e.t. – Match went to extra time
- p – Match decided by a penalty shootout after extra time
- N – North division
- S – South division
- B – Blue division
- R – Red division
- – Winning team won regular season
- – Winning team won National Championship

Ed.	Year	Champion	Score	Runner-up	Stadium	City	Att.	Season Champion(s)
1	1982	Syracuse (1)	1–0 (a.e.t.)	Boston College	n/a			
2	1983	Connecticut (1)	5–1	Syracuse	n/a			
3	1984	Connecticut (21)	1–0	Providence	n/a			
4	1985	Syracuse (2)	1–0	Connecticut	n/a			Connecticut (N), Pittsburgh (S)
5	1986	Seton Hall (1)	3–2	Syracuse	n/a			Syracuse (N), Seaton Hall (S)
6	1987	Seton Hall (2)	2–1	Connecticut	n/a			Connecticut (N), Seaton Hall (S)
7	1988	Seton Hall (3)	4–2	Connecticut	n/a			Connecticut (N), Seaton Hall (S)
8	1989	Connecticut (3)	3–1	Seton Hall	n/a			Connecticut (N), Seaton Hall (S)
9	1990	Boston College (1)	2–1	Seton Hall	n/a			Seaton Hall
10	1991	Seton Hall (4)	1–0	St. John's	n/a			Seaton Hall
11	1992	St. John’s (1)	2–1	Seton Hall	n/a			St. John's
12	1993	St. John’s (2)	2–0	Boston College	n/a			St. John's
13	1994	St. John’s (3)	1–0	Georgetown	n/a			Georgetown
14	1995	St. John’s (4)	2–0	Pittsburgh	n/a			Boston College
15	1996	Notre Dame' (1)	1–0	Rutgers	n/a			St. John's
16	1997	Rutgers (1)	2–1	St. John's	n/a			St. John's
17	1998	St. John's (5)	4–1	Georgestown	n/a			Connecticut
18	1999	Connecticut (4)	2–0	Georgestown	n/a			Rutgers
19	2000	Boston College (2)	2–1	Seton Hall	n/a			Connecticut
20	2001	St. John's (6)	1–0	Connecticut	n/a			Connecticut
21	2002	Boston College (3)	3–2	Connecticut	n/a			Boston College
22	2003	Notre Dame (2)	2–0	St. John's	n/a			St. John's
23	2004	Connecticut (5)	0–0	Seton Hall	n/a			Notre Dame
24	2005	Connecticut (6)	1–0	USF	n/a			Connecticut (B), USF (R)
25	2006	St. John's (7)	1–0 (a.e.t.)	West Virginia	n/a			West Virginia (B), Cincinnati (R)
26	2007	Connecticut (7)	2–0	Notre Dame	n/a			Connecticut (B), DePaul (R)
27	2008	USF (1)	1–0 (a.e.t.)	St. John's	n/a			Notre Dame (B), St. John's (R)
28	2009	St. John's (8)	0–0 (5–3 p)	Notre Dame	n/a			Connecticut (B), Louisville (R)
29	2010	Louisville (1)	1–1 (3–2 p)	Providence	n/a			Georgetown (B), Louisville (R)
30	2011	St. John's (9)	1–0 (a.e.t.)	Connecticut	n/a			Marquette (B), USF (R)
31	2012	Notre Dame (3)	3–2 (a.e.t.)	Georgetown	n/a			Connecticut (B), Louisville (R)
32	2013	Marquette (1)	3–2	Providence	PPL Park	Chester, PA	506	Georgetown
33	2014	Providence (1)	2–1	Xavier	PPL Park	Chester, PA	383	Creighton
34	2015	Georgetown (1)	2–1	Creighton	Shaw Field	Washington DC	1,541	Georgetown
35	2016	Butler (1)	2–1	Creighton	Butler Bowl	Indianapolis, IN	1,443	Providence
36	2017	Georgetown (2)	2–1	Xavier	Shaw Field	Washington DC	n/a	Butler
37	2018	Georgetown (3)	2–0	Marquette	Shaw Field	Washington, DC	1,641	Creighton
38	2019	Georgetown (4)	3–1	Providence	Shaw Field	Washington DC	1,031	Georgetown
39	2020	Seton Hall (5)	2–1	Georgetown	Shaw Field	Washington DC	0 (Note: No attendance due to COVID-19 pandemic in the United States.)	Georgetown
40	2021	Georgetown (5)	2–1 (a.e.t.)	Providence	Shaw Field	Washington DC	1,567	Georgetown
41	2022	Creighton (1)	3–0	Georgetown	SoccerPlex	Boyds, MD	3,530	Georgetown
42	2023	Xavier (1)	0–0 (5–4 p)	Georgetown	SoccerPlex	Boyds, MD	4,405	Georgetown
43	2024	Georgetown (6)	2–1	Providence	SoccerPlex	Boyds, MD	5,556	Akron
44	2025	Georgetown (7)	3–1	UConn	SoccerPlex	Boyds, MD	927	Georgetown
45	2026	Akron (1)	1–0 (a.e.t.)	Georgetown	SoccerPlex	Boyds, MD	824	Georgetown

=== By school ===
As of 2026 tournament

School	Titles	Title Years	App.	Last	W	L	T	Pct.
Akron	1	2026	3	2026	3	2	0	.600
Boston College	3	1990, 2000, 2002						
Butler	1	2016	6	2022	5	2	3	.650
Creighton	1	2022	11	2026	6	10	1	.382
Connecticut	7	1983, 1984, 1989, 1999, 2004, 2005, 2007	30	2024	33	21	3	.605
DePaul	0	—	9	2024	3	7	3	.346
Georgetown	7	2015, 2017, 2018, 2019, 2021, 2024, 2025	31	2026	26	22	7	.536
Marquette	1	2013	9	2020	4	8	2	.357
Notre Dame	3	1996, 2003, 2012						
Providence	1	2014	22	2024	20	20	6	.500
St. John's	9	1992, 1993, 1994, 1995, 1998, 2001, 2006, 2009, 2011	30	2024	36	20	4	.633
Seton Hall	5	1986, 1987, 1988, 2001, 2020	25	2026	15	18	6	.462
Villanova	0	—	14	2016	3	13	3	.237
Xavier	1	2023	8	2023	5	6	3	.464

- Titles listed are only from the 2013 season onward. Team records include all years as noted in the Big East Conference Record Book.
