= 2016 Big East Conference men's soccer season =

- League: NCAA Division I
- Sport: Soccer
- Duration: August, 2016 – November, 2016
- Teams: 10

2017 MLS SuperDraft
- Top draft pick: Julian Gressel, Providence
- Picked by: Atlanta United FC, 8th overall

Regular season
- Season champions: Providence
- Runners-up: Butler
- Season MVP: Offensive: David Goldsmith; Julian Gressel; Midfielder: Ricardo Perez; Defensive: Corey Brown

Tournament
- Champions: Butler
- Runners-up: Creighton

Big East men's soccer seasons
- ← 2015 2017 →

2016 Big East Conference men's soccer standings
	Conf.					Overall
Team	W		L		T	W		L		T
No. 10 Providence +	7	–	2	–	0	15	–	7	–	0
No. 18 Butler ‡	6	–	3	–	0	13	–	5	–	2
No. 15 Creighton +	5	–	3	–	1	13	–	7	–	3
Villanova +	5	–	3	–	1	10	–	8	–	2
Xavier	4	–	4	–	1	8	–	8	–	3
DePaul	4	–	5	–	0	9	–	7	–	3
Georgetown	3	–	4	–	2	6	–	9	–	2
Saint John's	2	–	5	–	2	6	–	7	–	4
Marquette	2	–	5	–	2	5	–	7	–	4
Seton Hall	2	–	6	–	1	4	–	11	–	2
‡-Tournament champion +- Invited to the NCAA Division I Men's Soccer Championship; As of 13 December 2016; Rankings from NSCAA

The 2016 Big East Conference men's soccer season was the fourth season for the newly realigned Big East Conference. Including the history of the original Big East Conference, this was the 21st season of men's soccer under the "Big East Conference" name.

The Georgetown Hoyas are both the defending regular season and conference tournament champions.

== Changes from 2015 ==
- None

== Teams ==
=== Stadiums and locations ===
Team	Location	Stadium	Capacity
Butler Bulldogs	Indianapolis, Indiana	Butler Bowl	7,500
Creighton Bluejays	Omaha, Nebraska	Morrison Stadium	6,000
DePaul Blue Demons	Chicago, Illinois	Cacciatore Stadium	1,200
Georgetown Hoyas	Washington, D.C.	Shaw Field	2,000
Marquette Golden Eagles	Milwaukee, Wisconsin	Valley Fields	1,600
Providence Friars	Providence, Rhode Island	Glay Field	3,000
St. John's Red Storm	Jamaica, New York	Belson Stadium	2,168
Seton Hall Pirates	South Orange, New Jersey	Owen T. Carroll Field	1,800
Villanova Wildcats	Villanova, Pennsylvania	Villanova Soccer Complex	1,000
Xavier Musketeers	Cincinnati, Ohio	XU Soccer Complex	1,500

== Regular season ==
=== Results ===
Team/opponent	BUT	CRE	DEP	GEO	MRQ	PC	STJ	SET	VIL	XAV
Butler Bulldogs						2–0			3–2	
Creighton Bluejays			4–1					4–1		
DePaul Blue Demons		1–4								0–1
Georgetown Hoyas						1–0				0–2
Marquette Golden Eagles							0–0		1–2	
Providence Friars	0–2			0–1						
St. John's Red Storm					0–0			1–0		
Seton Hall Pirates		1–4					0–1			
Villanova Wildcats	2–3				2–1					
Xavier Musketeers			1–0	2–0						

=== Rankings ===
Legend
Increase in ranking
Decrease in ranking
Not ranked previous week

		Pre	Wk 1	Wk 2	Wk 3	Wk 4	Wk 5	Wk 6	Wk 7	Wk 8	Wk 9	Wk 10	Wk 11	Wk 12	Final
Butler	C		RV	19	10	10	7	9	11	19	15	18	15	11	18
Creighton	C	7	8	14	14	12	10	10	6	10	18	24	24	23	15
DePaul	C														
Georgetown	C	10	24	NR											
Marquette	C														
Providence	C											25	22	RV	10
Seton Hall	C														
St. John's	C														
Villanova	C										RV	RV	NR		
Xavier	C						RV	NR	RV	RV	NR				

== Postseason ==
=== Big East tournament ===
Quarterfinals; Sunday, November 6
4	Creighton	3
5	Xavier	1
3	Villanova (pen.)	0 (3)
6	DePaul	0 (1)

Semifinals; Thursday, November 10
1	Providence	1
4	Creighton	2
2	Butler (2OT)	1
3	Villanova	0

Finals; Sunday, November 13
4	Creighton	1
2	Butler	2

=== NCAA tournament ===
Seed	Region	School	1st round	2nd round	3rd round	Quarterfinals	Semifinals	Championship
15	4	Butler	BYE	T, 0–0 ^{L, 5–6 pen.} vs. SIUE – (Indianapolis)				
—N/a	1	Providence	W, 2–0 vs. Delaware – (Providence)	W, 5–4 vs. #1 Maryland – (College Park)	W, 2–1 vs. Creighton – (Omaha)	L, 0–1 (OT) vs. North Carolina – (Chapel Hill)		
—N/a	1	Creighton	W, 3–0 vs. Tulsa – (Omaha)	W, 3–2 #16 Kentucky – (Lexington)	L, 1–2 vs. Providence – (Omaha)			
—N/a	4	Villanova	L, 0–2 vs. Akron – (Akron)					

== All-Big East awards and teams ==
2016 Big East Men's Soccer Individual Awards
Award	Recipient(s)
Offensive Player of the Year	David Goldsmith, Butler, Sr., F Julian Gressel, Providence, Sr., F
Midfielder of the Year	Ricardo Perez, Creighton, Sr., M/F
Defensive Player of the Year	Cory Brown, Xavier, Jr., D
Coaching Staff of the Year	Providence†
Freshman of the Year	Luka Prpa, Marquette, Fr., M

2016 Big East Men's Soccer All-Conference Teams
First Team	Second Team	Rookie Team
David Goldsmith, Butler, Sr., F †; Julian Gressel, Providence, Sr., F †; Harry Cooksley, St. John's, Jr., M/F; Ricardo Perez, Creighton, Sr., M/F; Jared Timmer, Butler, So., M Simon Megally, DePaul, Sr., M Christopher Lema, Georgetown, Jr., M Cory Brown, Xavier, Jr., D Mark Jecewiz, Providence, RS-Jr., D Lucas Stauffer, Creighton, Jr., D Colin Miller, Providence, RS-So., GK	Riggs Lennon, Creighton, Sr., F Ricky Lopez-Espin, Creighton, Jr., F Miguel Polley, Villanova, RS-Jr., M/F; Andres Arcila, Seton Hall, So., M Arun Basuljevic, Georgetown, Jr., M Andreas Bartosinski, Villanova, Jr., M Mitch LaGro, Creighton, RS-So., D/M; Mitch Ostrowski, Butler, RS-Sr., D John Pothast, Marquette, RS-Sr., D Shane Bradley, Villanova, Fr., D Matt Nance, Xavier, Jr., D Alex Kapp, Creighton, Sr., GK	Isaac Galliford, Butler, Fr., M†; Lewis Suddick, Butler, Fr., M/F†; Max de Bruijne, DePaul, Fr., D Dylan Nealis, Georgetown, Fr., D Luka Prpa, Marquette, Fr., M†; Danny Griffin, Providence, Fr., M†; Joao Serrano, Providence, Fr., D†; Liam Wilson, Providence, Fr., D Alistair Johnston, St. John's, Fr., M Jonathan Jimenez, Seton Hall, Fr., F Shane Bradley, Villanova, Fr., D Derrick Otim, Xavier, Fr., M

† Unanimous selection

== See also ==
- 2016 NCAA Division I men's soccer season
- 2016 Big East Men's Soccer Tournament
- 2016 Big East Conference women's soccer season
