= 2024 Big East Conference men's soccer tournament =

- Classification: Division I
- Teams: 8
- Matches: 7
- Attendance: 5,556
- First round site: Top Seed Campus Site
- Semifinals site: Maryland SoccerPlex; Boyds, Maryland
- Finals site: Maryland SoccerPlex; Boyds, Maryland
- Champions: Georgetown (6th title)
- Winning coach: Brian Wiese (6th title)
- MVP: Max Viera (Offensive); Eric Howard (Defensive) (Georgetown)
- Broadcast: Big East Network (Quarterfinals and Semifinals), Fox Sports 2 (Final)

2024 Big East Conference men's soccer standings
	Conf.					Overall
Team	W		L		T	W		L		T
East
Providence +	5	–	1	–	2	13	–	6	–	3
St. John's	5	–	1	–	2	9	–	6	–	5
No. 25 Georgetown ‡	5	–	2	–	1	11	–	5	–	5
Seton Hall	4	–	3	–	1	11	–	6	–	1
UConn	3	–	2	–	3	8	–	4	–	6
Villanova	0	–	7	–	1	1	–	10	–	6
Midwest
No. 21 Akron +	7	–	0	–	1	12	–	5	–	4
Creighton	4	–	3	–	1	9	–	6	–	3
DePaul	2	–	4	–	2	6	–	8	–	3
Marquette	2	–	4	–	2	6	–	7	–	4
Xavier	1	–	5	–	2	4	–	8	–	5
Butler	1	–	7	–	0	4	–	10	–	3
‡ – 2024 Big East tournament champion + – At-large invitation to the 2024 NCAA tournament; As of December 18, 2024; Rankings from United Soccer Coaches; Source: Big East

The 2024 Big East Conference men's soccer tournament was the post-season women's soccer tournament for the Big East Conference held from November 9 to 17, 2024. The eight-match tournament took place at Maryland SoccerPlex in Boyds, Maryland for the semifinals and finals, while the first round was hosted by the higher seeded team. The eight-team single-elimination tournament consisted of three rounds based on seeding from regular season conference play. The defending champions were the Providence Friars. They were unable to defend their title, despite reaching the Final as the second seed. Fourth seed Georgetown finished as tournament champions after defeating Providence 2–1 in the Final. This was the sixth Big East title in program history for Georgetown, all of which have come under head coach Brian Wiese. As tournament champions, Georgetown earned the Big East's automatic place in the 2024 NCAA Division I men's soccer tournament.

== Seeding ==
The top eight teams in the regular season earned a spot in the 2024 tournament. Teams were seeded based on regular season conference record and tiebreakers were used to determine seedings of teams that finished with the same record. A tiebreaker was required to determine the second and third seeds as Providence and St. John's both finished with 5–1–2 regular season records. The two teams tied their regular season match-up 1–1 on October 19. Providence won the tiebreaker and earned the second seed. A second tiebreaker was required for the fifth and sixth seed between Creighton and Seton Hall as both teams finished with identical 4–3–1 regular season records. The two teams did not meet during the regular season and Creighton won the tiebreaker to earn the fifth seed. A final tiebreaker was required for the eighth and final seed in the tournament between DePaul and Marquette as both teams finished with identical 2–4–2 regular season records. The two teams tied their regular season match-up 2–2 on October 23. DePaul won the tiebreaker and earned the final spot in the tournament.

Seed	School	Conference record	Points
1	Akron	7–0–1	22
2	Providence	5–1–2	17
3	St. John's	5–1–2	17
4	Georgetown	5–2–1	16
5	Creighton	4–3–1	13
6	Seton Hall	4–3–1	13
7	UConn	3–2–3	12
8	DePaul	2–4–2	8

== Bracket ==
First round Saturday, Nov. 9
1	Akron	3
8	DePaul	1
4	Georgetown	1
5	Creighton	0
3	St. John's	2
6	Seton Hall	0
2	Providence	2
7	UConn	1

Semifinals; Thursday, Nov. 14
1	Akron	1
4	Georgetown (a.e.t)	2
2	Providence (a.e.t)	2
3	St. John's	1

Final; Sunday, Nov. 17
4	Georgetown	2
2	Providence	1

== Schedule ==
=== First Round ===
November 9, 2024	#4 Georgetown	1–0	#5 Creighton	Washington, D.C.
12:00 p.m. EST	Mateo Ponce Ocampo 45'	Report	(yellow card) 50' Roman Torres; (yellow card) 53' Matthew Reed; (yellow card) 88' (yellow-red card) 88' Mark O'Neill; (yellow card) 89' Fabian Alvarez	Stadium: Shaw Field; Attendance: 987; Referee: Hilario Grajeda; Assistant referees: Jeffrey Skinker; Justin Weinstock; Fourth official: Balvir Cabrera Garcia

November 9, 2024	#3 St. John's	2–0	#6 Seton Hall	New York, NY
5:00 p.m. EST	Julian Jakopovic 25', (yellow card) 87'; Miguel Diaz (yellow card) 54'; Bjorn Nikolajewski (yellow card) 67'; Thomas Lamaille 84'	Report	(yellow card) 66' Jared Smith	Stadium: Belson Stadium; Attendance: 668; Referee: Victor Borges; Assistant referees: Kyle O'Grady; Aiden Krok; Fourth official: Jan Halaska

November 9, 2024	#1 Akron	3–1	#8 DePaul	Akron, OH
7:00 pm. EST	Victor Gaulmin 26'; Emil Jaaskelainen 30', 47'	Report	(yellow card) 21' Max Padua; 64' Logan Finnegan; (yellow card) 73' Jayden Waski; (yellow card) 84' George Wyatt	Stadium: FirstEnergy Stadium; Attendance: 1,476; Referee: Lucas Feathers; Assistant referees: Saki Atsas; John Satar; Fourth official: Chris Regan

November 9, 2024	#2 Providence	2–0	#7 UConn	Providence, RI
7:00 pm. EST	Diego Batista (yellow card) 38'; Israel Dos Santos Neto 53'; Bernardo Prego (yellow card) 74'; Gabriel Chavez (yellow card) 81'; Bruno Rosa 81' (pen.)	Report	(yellow card) 9' Mikah Thomas; (yellow card) 38' Scott Testori; (yellow card) 81' Team; (yellow card) 83' Sabri Hanni	Stadium: Chapey Field; Attendance: 1,094; Referee: William DeLois; Assistant referees: Sean Regan; Johnathan Luk; Fourth official: Kurtis Burke

=== Semifinals ===
November 14, 2024	#2 Providence	2–1 (a.e.t.)	#3 St. John's	Boyds, MD
5:00 p.m. EST	Pearse O'Brien 21'; Vasco Teixeira (yellow card) 65'; Israel Dos Santos Neto 92'	Report	2' Jackson Gould; (yellow card) 49' Camron Boumsong	Stadium: Maryland SoccerPlex; Referee: Dimitar Chavdarov; Assistant referees: Juri Siskin; Alexander Tyshkevych; Fourth official: Peter Dhima

November 14, 2024	#1 Akron	1–2 (a.e.t.)	#4 Georgetown	Boyds, MD
7:30 p.m. EST	Emil Jaaskelainen 55'	Report	8' Marlon Tabora; (yellow card) 62' Matty Helfrich; 99' Aidan Godinho	Stadium: Maryland SoccerPlex; Attendance: 557; Referee: Nikola Aleksic; Assistant referees: Hugo Menguy; Jason Blight; Fourth official: Alexander Luttmann

=== Final ===
November 17, 2024	#2 Providence	1–2	#4 Georgetown	Boyds, MD
12:00 p.m. EST	Israel Dos Santos Neto 16'; Cole Dewhurst (yellow card) 79'	Report	47' Cole Parete; 79' Eric Howard; (yellow card) 82' Mitchell Baker	Stadium: Maryland SoccerPlex; Attendance: 774; Referee: JC Griggs; Assistant referees: Randal Von Steuben; Esli Leon; Fourth official: Israel Campos

== Statistics ==
=== Goalscorers ===
There were 18 goals scored in 7 matches, for an average of 2.57 goals per match (as of November 17, 2024).

3 goals

- Israel Dos Santos Neto – Providence
- Emil Jaaskelainen – Akron

1 goal

- Logan Finnegan – DePaul
- Victor Gaulmin – Akron
- Aidan Godinho – Georgetown
- Jackson Gould – St. John's
- Eric Howard – Georgetown
- Julian Jakopovic – St. John's
- Thomas Lamaille – St. John's
- Pearse O'Brien – Providence
- Cole Parete – Georgetown
- Mateo Ponce Ocampo – Georgetown
- Bruno Rosa – Providence
- Marlon Tabora – Georgetown

== All-Tournament team ==
Player	Team
Matt Dreas	Akron
Emil Jaaskelainen	Akron
Eric Howard^	Georgetown
Maximus Jennings	Georgetown
Tenzing Manske	Georgetown
Max Viera*	Georgetown
Lukas Burns	Providence
Israel Dos Santos Neto	Providence
Pearse O’Brien	Providence
Jackson Gould	St. John's
Tyler Morck	St. John's

* Offensive MVP
^ Defensive MVP
