= 2014 Big East Conference men's soccer tournament =

2014 Big East men's soccer tournament
Tournament details
- Country: United States
- Teams: 6

Final positions
- Champions: Providence
- Runners-up: Xavier

Tournament statistics
- Matches played: 5
- Goals scored: 11 (2.2 per match)
- Top goal scorer: Markus Naglestad (2)

2014 Big East Conference men's soccer standings
	Conf.					Overall
Team	W		L		T	W		L		T
No. 7 Creighton +	7	–	1	–	1	16	–	3	–	3
No. 13 Xavier +	6	–	1	–	2	15	–	6	–	2
No. 5 Georgetown +	6	–	2	–	1	14	–	4	–	5
No. 3 Providence ‡	5	–	2	–	2	16	–	5	–	2
Villanova	3	–	4	–	2	8	–	8	–	3
Marquette	2	–	3	–	4	8	–	6	–	4
Seton Hall	2	–	4	–	3	5	–	7	–	5
Butler	2	–	5	–	2	6	–	7	–	5
DePaul	1	–	6	–	2	4	–	10	–	4
Saint John's	1	–	7	–	1	4	–	10	–	4
‡ - Tournament champion +- Invited to the NCAA Division I Men's Soccer Championship; As of December 16, 2014; Rankings from NSCAA

The 2014 Big East men's soccer tournament was the second men's soccer tournament of the new Big East Conference, formed in July 2013 after the original Big East Conference split into two leagues along football lines. Including the history of the original conference, it was the 19th edition of the Big East tournament.

Held from November 11–16, 2014 at PPL Park in Chester, Pennsylvania, it determined the Big East Conference champion, and the automatic berth into the 2014 NCAA Division I Men's Soccer Championship. The tournament was won by the Providence Friars who defeated the Xavier Musketeers in the Big East final.

== Bracket ==
First Round
3	Georgetown	2
6	Marquette	1
4	Providence	2
5	Villanova	1

Semifinals
2	Xavier	1
3	Georgetown	0
1	Creighton	0
4	Providence	1

Championship
2	Xavier	1
4	Providence	2

== Schedule ==
=== First round ===
November 11	#3 Georgetown Hoyas	2–1	#6 Marquette Golden Eagles	Washington, D.C.
2:00 p.m. EST	Basuljevic 60'; Martz 65'	Report	OG – Georgetown 62'	Stadium: Shaw Field

November 11	#4 Providence Friars	2–1	#5 Villanova Wildcats	Providence, Rhode Island
7:00 p.m. EST	Naglestad 38'; Gressel 42'	Report	Kroschwitz 24'	Stadium: Glay Field

=== Semi-finals ===
November 14	#1 Creighton Bluejays	0–1	#4 Providence Friars	Chester, Pennsylvania
6:00 p.m. EST		Report	Machado 73'	Stadium: PPL Park

November 14	#2 Xavier Musketeers	1–0	#3 Georgetown Hoyas	Chester, Pennsylvania
8:30 p.m. EST	Brown 64'	Report		Stadium: PPL Park

=== Big East Championship ===
November 16	#2 Xavier Musketeers	1–2	#4 Providence Friars	Chester, Pennsylvania
5:00 p.m. EST	Risdale 23'	Report	Naglestad 26'; Neustadter 81'	Stadium: PPL Park

== Statistical leaders ==
=== Most Goals ===
Markus Naglestad – Providence – 2

== See also ==
- Big East Conference
- Big East Conference Men's Soccer Tournament
- 2014 Big East Conference men's soccer season
- 2014 NCAA Division I men's soccer season
- 2014 NCAA Division I Men's Soccer Championship
