= 2018 Big East Conference men's soccer tournament =

- Classification: Division I
- Teams: 6
- Quarterfinals site: Higher seeds
- Semifinals site: Higher seeds
- Finals site: Shaw Field; Washington, D.C.
- Champions: Georgetown (3rd title)
- Winning coach: Brian Wiese (3rd title)
- MVP: Offensive: Ethan Lochner (Georgetown); Defensive: Brendan McDonough (Georgetown)
- Broadcast: BEDN, FSG, FS2

2018 Big East Conference men's soccer standings
	Conf.					Overall
Team	W		L		T	W		L		T
Creighton	7	–	1	–	1	11	–	4	–	3
No. 13 Georgetown ‡	6	–	2	–	1	13	–	5	–	3
Providence	6	–	2	–	1	10	–	7	–	2
Marquette	5	–	3	–	1	7	–	9	–	3
Xavier	4	–	4	–	1	6	–	7	–	6
St. John's	3	–	3	–	3	7	–	8	–	3
DePaul	2	–	5	–	2	5	–	9	–	3
Villanova	2	–	6	–	1	7	–	8	–	2
Seton Hall	2	–	6	–	1	6	–	7	–	2
Butler	2	–	7	–	0	4	–	12	–	2
‡ – 2018 Big East Tournament champion + – Invited to the 2018 NCAA Division I Men's Soccer Championship; As of December 11, 2018; Rankings from United Soccer Coaches

The 2018 Big East men's soccer tournament, was the sixth men's soccer tournament of the new Big East Conference, formed in July 2013 after the original Big East Conference split into two leagues along football lines. Including the history of the original conference, it was the 23rd edition of the Big East tournament.

Georgetown repeated as champions, to earn their second-ever Big East soccer title, and their eighth overall NCAA Tournament berth. The Hoyas were the only Big East team to earn a berth into the NCAA Tournament, which they were seeded 13th in the tournament. In the tournament, the Hoyas knocked off Mid-American Conference regular season Champions, West Virginia.

== Seeds ==
Seed	School	Conference	Tiebreaker
1	Creighton	7–1–1	
2	Georgetown	6–2–1	GU 1–0 vs. PC
3	Providence	6–2–1	PC 0–1 vs. GU
4	Marquette	5–3–1	
5	Xavier	4–4–1	
6	St. John's	3–3–3	

== Bracket ==
First round Nov. 3
4	Marquette (pen.)	2 (7)
5	Xavier	2 (6)
3	Providence	1
6	St. John's	0

Semifinals; Nov. 7
1	Creighton	1 (9)
4	Marquette (pen.)	1 (10)
2	Georgetown	4
3	Providence	0

Final; Nov. 11
4	Marquette	0
2	Georgetown	2

== Results ==
=== First round ===
November 3
7:00 p.m. EST

No. 3 Providence	1–0	No. 6 St. John's
Deperro 14'; Constantine (yellow card) 72'; Kline (yellow card) 83'	Report	Rivas (yellow card) 52'; Aquilon (yellow card) 86'

Anderson Stadium, Providence
Attendance: 859
Referee: Eric Tattersall

November 3
8:00 p.m. EST

No. 4 Marquette	2–2 (a.e.t.)	No. 5 Xavier
Prpa 64' (yellow card) 77'; Núñez 72'	Report	Otim 12'; Sergi 83'; Hestnes (yellow card) 84'; Wilson (yellow card) 85'
Penalties
Prpa (penalty scored); Seagrist (penalty scored); Coan (penalty scored); Núñez (penalty missed); Alba (penalty scored); Sanchez (penalty scored); Posarelli (penalty scored); Salmeron (penalty missed); Villa (penalty scored)	5–6	(penalty scored) Sergi; (penalty scored) Hestnes; (penalty scored) Goodall; (penalty scored) Pauer; (penalty missed) Nance; (penalty scored) Boe-Tangen; (penalty scored) Otim; (penalty missed) Belle; (penalty missed) Curran

Valley Fields, Milwaukee
Attendance: 328
Referee: Carmen Serbio

=== Semifinals ===
November 7
2:00 p.m. EST

No. 2 Georgetown	4–0	No. 3 Providence
Zájec 30'; Strassner 59'; Lochner 80', 81'	Report

Shaw Field, Washington, D.C.
Attendance: 577
Referee: Sergio Gonzalez

November 7
8:00 p.m. EST

No. 1 Creighton	1–1 (a.e.t.)	No. 4 Marquette
Haakenson 23'	Report	Prpa 25'
Penalties
Koenig (penalty missed); Fohr (penalty scored); Ward (penalty scored); LaGro (penalty missed); Rydstrand (penalty scored); Boudadi (penalty scored); Macchione (penalty scored); Tashiro (penalty scored); Espeleta (penalty scored); Haakenson (penalty scored); Koenig (penalty scored); Fohr (penalty missed)	9–10	(penalty scored) Prpa; (penalty missed) Coan; (penalty scored) Wegner; (penalty missed) Seagrist; (penalty scored) C. Alba; (penalty scored) M. Alba; (penalty scored) Sunesson; (penalty scored) Posarelli; (penalty scored) Villa; (penalty scored) Bohm; (penalty scored) Prpa; (penalty scored) Coan

Morrison Stadium, Omaha
Attendance: 1,352
Referee: John McCloskey

=== Final ===
November 11
2:00 p.m. EST

No. 2 Georgetown	2–0	No. 4 Marquette
McDonough 11'; Achara 70'	Report

Shaw Field, Washington, D.C.
Attendance: 1,641
Referee: Mark Kadlecik

== Statistics ==
=== Goals ===
Rank	Player	College	Goals
1	(United States) Ethan Lochner	Georgetown	2
1	(Croatia) Luka Prpa	Marquette	2
2	(United States) Matt Deperro	Providence	1
2	(Spain) Diego Núñez	Marquette	1
2	(Norway) Luke Haakenson	Creighton	1
2	(England) Derrick Otim	Xavier	1
2	(United States) Samson Sergi	Xavier	1
2	(United States) Riley Strassner	Georgetown	1
2	(United States) Kyle Zajec	Georgetown	1

=== Assists ===
Rank	Player	College	Assists
1	(United States) Patrick Seagrist	Marquette	3
2	(Norway) Simen Hestnes	Xavier	2
3	(United States) Cameron Belle	Xavier	1
3	(United States) Brendan Constantine	Providence	1
3	(United States) Jacob Montes	Georgetown	1
3	(United States) Dylan Nealis	Georgetown	1
3	(Vietnam) Kevin Vang	Providence	1
3	(United States) Zak Wegner	Marquette	1

== All Tournament Team ==
- Tournament Offensive MVP: Ethan Lochner, Georgetown
- Tournament Defensive MVP: Brendan McDonough, Georgetown

All-Tournament team:

- Ifunanyachi Achara, Georgetown
- Ethan Lochner, Georgetown
- Brendan McDonough, Georgetown
- Kyle Zajec, Georgetown
- Luis Barraza, Marquette
- Luka Prpa, Marquette

- Patrick Seagrist, Marquette
- Joel Rydstrand, Creighton
- Akeem Ward, Creighton
- Brendan Constantine, Providence
- João Serrano, Providence
