= 2013 Big East Conference men's soccer tournament =

2013 Big East men's soccer tournament
Tournament details
- Country: United States
- Teams: 6

Final positions
- Champions: Marquette
- Runners-up: Providence

Tournament statistics
- Top goal scorer: Adam Lysak (2)

2013 Big East men's soccer standings
	Conf.					Overall
Team	W		L		T	W		L		T
No. 10 Georgetown +	6	–	2	–	1	14	–	5	–	2
No. 12 Marquette ‡	6	–	2	–	1	13	–	6	–	2
Providence +	6	–	3	–	0	11	–	6	–	4
Xavier	6	–	3	–	0	10	–	6	–	2
Creighton +	4	–	4	–	1	9	–	9	–	2
Butler	4	–	5	–	0	10	–	8	–	1
St. John's +	3	–	4	–	2	11	–	7	–	2
Villanova	3	–	6	–	0	8	–	9	–	1
Seton Hall	3	–	6	–	0	7	–	9	–	2
DePaul	1	–	7	–	1	5	–	11	–	2
‡ - Tournament champion + - Invited to the NCAA Division I Men's Soccer Championship; As of December 17, 2013; Rankings from NCSAA

The 2013 Big East men's soccer tournament was the inaugural men's soccer tournament of the new Big East Conference, formed in July 2013 after the original Big East Conference split into two leagues along football lines. Including the history of the original conference, it was the 18th edition of the Big East tournament.

Held from November 15–17 at PPL Park in Chester, Pennsylvania, it determined the Big East Conference champion, and the automatic berth into the 2013 NCAA Division I Men's Soccer Championship. The defending champions, the Notre Dame Fighting Irish, left the original Big East at the time of the conference split to join the Atlantic Coast Conference. The tournament was won by the Marquette Golden Eagles who defeated the Providence Friars in the Big East final.

== Bracket ==
First Round
3	Xavier	0
6	Butler	1
4	Providence	2
5	Creighton	1

Semifinals
2	Marquette	1
6	Butler	0
1	Georgetown	0(4)
4	Providence (pen.)	0(5)

Championship
2	Marquette	3
4	Providence	2

== Schedule ==
=== First round ===
November 12, 2013	#3 Xavier	0–1	#6 Butler	Cincinnati, Ohio
17:00 ET		Report	Goldsmith 29'	Stadium: XU Soccer Complex; Attendance: 431; Referee: Khalaf Al-Latayfeh

November 12, 2013	#4 Providence	2–1	#5 Creighton	Providence, Rhode Island
17:00 ET	Arboleda 45'; Machado 64'	Report	DeJulio 87'	Stadium: XU Soccer Complex; Attendance: 210; Referee: Erich Simmons

=== Semifinals ===
November 15, 2013	#1 Georgetown	0–0 (a.e.t.) (4–5 p)	#4 Providence	Chester, Pennsylvania
17:00 ET	Yaro (yellow card) 37'; Rudy (yellow card) 85'	Report	Machando (yellow card) 34'; Andrade (yellow card) 37'	Stadium: PPL Park; Attendance: 563; Referee: Bill Dittmar
	Penalties
	Neumann (penalty scored); Muyl (penalty missed); Allen (penalty scored); Padilla (penalty scored); Helfrich (penalty scored); Yaro (penalty missed)		(penalty scored) Steeves; (penalty scored) Gressel; (penalty missed) Baumann; (penalty scored) Naglestad; (penalty scored) Arboleda; (penalty scored) Ballenthin

November 15, 2013	#2 Marquette	1–0 (a.e.t.)	#6 Butler	Chester, Pennsylvania
19:30 ET	Wahl (yellow card) 87'; Lysak 98'	Report		Stadium: PPL Park; Attendance: 563; Referee: Craig Lowry

=== Big East Championship ===
November 17, 2013	#2 Marquette	3–2	#4 Providence	Chester, Pennsylvania
13:00 ET	Jansson 34'; Parianos 37'; Lysak 59' (yellow card) 70'	Report	Alder (yellow card) 38'; Towler (yellow card) 59'; Andrade 67'; Steeves 87' (yellow card) 90'	Stadium: PPL Park; Attendance: 506; Referee: Hayden Cust

== See also ==
- Atlantic 10 Conference
- 2013 Atlantic 10 Conference men's soccer season
- 2013 NCAA Division I men's soccer season
- 2013 NCAA Division I Men's Soccer Championship
