= Keith Tabatznik =

US association football player

Personal information
- Full name: Keith D. Tabatznik

Youth career
- Years: Team
- 1976–1979: American University

Managerial career
- 1984–2005: Georgetown Hoyas

Keith D. Tabatznik is a former collegiate head men's soccer coach and currently a Talent ID Scout and Coach Educator for US Soccer. He's most famous for coaching Georgetown University from 1984 to 2005. The 22 year head coach compiled a 220–178–22 record, and remains Georgetown's all-time winningest soccer coach. He led his teams to the Big East conference tournament 12 straight seasons at one point. From 1998 to 1999, the Hoyas reached the championship match of the Big East Championships, and won 15 games both seasons. His 1997 squad saw the Hoyas capture their first ever NCAA tournament victory with a 2–1 victory over Virginia Commonwealth University. He was named Big East conference coach of the year that season. His success at Georgetown is more remarkable as the program at that time period was the lowest funded team in the BIG EAST conference and one of the lowest funded in the nation.

His 1994 team recorded the school's first ever berth in the NCAA tournament, including the school's first ever Big East regular season championship. He was named Big East coach of the year after leading the Hoyas to an 18–4 record. He previously served as an assistant coach at George Washington University. He is a 1980 graduate of American University.

Tabatznik led the East team to the gold medal in the 1997 Sports Festival games with an upset victory over the US Under 23 team that would be the next Olympic Team. Shortly after this Tabatznik was named the head coach for the United States National Amateur Team which served as the US National B team.

Tabatznik served as an assistant national coach for Bermuda for World Cup qualifying in 2009. He also served as the head coach for Region 1 Olympic Development Program from 2010 to 2016 following in the footsteps of US soccer legends Manfred Schellscheidt, Bob Bradley, Jay Hoffman and others. He is on the US National Staff for coaching education. He has been a TV analyst for Fox Soccer Channel and for Comcast SportsNet – working on college games and for DC United.

In 1982, he coached Northwest Soccer Club to the Maryland State Cup championship over the Potomac Kickers in what was considered at the time the biggest upset in youth soccer in Maryland.

In January, 2011 he was inducted into the Virginia/DC Soccer Hall of Fame and in May 2016 was inducted into the Baltimore Friends School Athletic Hall of Fame. He does consultant work and is considered one of the top clinicians in the country. In March 2016 he was named director of soccer for McLean Youth Soccer. In May 2018 he was inducted into the Maryland State Soccer Hall of Fame.
