= 2017 Big East Conference men's soccer tournament =

- Classification: Division I
- Teams: 6
- Matches: 5
- Quarterfinals site: Higher seeds
- Semifinals site: Higher seeds Dayton, Ohio
- Finals site: Shaw Field; Washington, D.C.
- Champions: Georgetown (2nd title)
- Winning coach: Brian Wiese (2nd title)
- MVP: JT Marcinkowski (Georgetown)
- Broadcast: ESPN3

2017 Big East Conference men's soccer standings
	Conf.					Overall
Team	W		L		T	W		L		T
No. 12 Butler +	8	–	1	–	0	14	–	5	–	2
No. 16 Georgetown ‡	6	–	2	–	1	14	–	4	–	2
Saint John's	5	–	2	–	2	9	–	7	–	3
Xavier	5	–	4	–	0	11	–	6	–	3
Providence	2	–	2	–	5	5	–	8	–	5
Creighton	3	–	4	–	2	9	–	7	–	2
Marquette	3	–	5	–	1	3	–	11	–	2
Seton Hall	3	–	6	–	0	6	–	10	–	1
DePaul	2	–	6	–	1	5	–	11	–	2
Villanova	2	–	7	–	0	7	–	11	–	0
‡ – 2017 Big East Tournament champion + – Invited to the 2017 NCAA Division I Men's Soccer Championship; As of December 13, 2017; Rankings from United Soccer Coaches

The 2017 Big East men's soccer tournament, was the fifth men's soccer tournament of the new Big East Conference, formed in July 2013 after the original Big East Conference split into two leagues along football lines. Including the history of the original conference, it was the 22nd edition of the Big East tournament.

== Seeding ==
The top six teams qualified. Tiebreakers were determined by the team's winning percentage, followed by head-to-head record.

Seed	Team	W	L	T	Pct	Pts
1	Butler	8	1	0	.889	24
2	Georgetown	6	2	1	.722	19
3	St. John's	5	2	2	.667	17
4	Xavier	5	4	0	.556	15
5	Providence	2	2	5	.500	11
6	Creighton	3	4	2	.444	11

== Bracket ==
Quarterfinals; Sunday, November 4
4	Xavier	3
5	Providence	0
3	St. John's	3
6	Creighton	1

Semifinals; Thursday, November 8
1	Butler	2 (1)
4	Xavier (pen.)	2 (4)
2	Georgetown	2
3	St. John's	1

Finals; Sunday, November 12
4	Xavier	1
2	Georgetown (2OT)	2
