= 2016 Big East Conference men's soccer tournament =

- Classification: Division I
- Teams: 6
- Matches: 5
- Site: Butler Bowl; Indianapolis, Indiana
- Champions: Butler (1st title)
- Winning coach: Paul Snape (1st title)

2016 Big East Conference men's soccer standings
	Conf.					Overall
Team	W		L		T	W		L		T
No. 10 Providence +	7	–	2	–	0	15	–	7	–	0
No. 18 Butler ‡	6	–	3	–	0	13	–	5	–	2
No. 15 Creighton +	5	–	3	–	1	13	–	7	–	3
Villanova +	5	–	3	–	1	10	–	8	–	2
Xavier	4	–	4	–	1	8	–	8	–	3
DePaul	4	–	5	–	0	9	–	7	–	3
Georgetown	3	–	4	–	2	6	–	9	–	2
Saint John's	2	–	5	–	2	6	–	7	–	4
Marquette	2	–	5	–	2	5	–	7	–	4
Seton Hall	2	–	6	–	1	4	–	11	–	2
‡-Tournament champion +- Invited to the NCAA Division I Men's Soccer Championship; As of 13 December 2016; Rankings from NSCAA

The 2016 Big East men's soccer tournament, was the fourth men's soccer tournament of the new Big East Conference, formed in July 2013 after the original Big East Conference split into two leagues along football lines. Including the history of the original conference, it was the 21st edition of the Big East tournament.

The tournament was won by the Butler Bulldogs who won their first Big East title since joining the conference. Including their history in the Horizon League, this was Butler's sixth ever conference tournament title. The Bulldogs beat the Creighton Bluejays, 2–1 in the final. Butler took the lead in the 37th minute off of a goal from Isaac Galliford, and doubled their lead in the 64th minute from a goal by Eric Leonard. Creighton added an insurance goal in the 67th minute from Myles Englis.

== Seeding ==
The top six teams qualified. Tiebreakers were determined by the team's head-to-head record.

Seed	School	Conference	Tiebreaker
1	Providence	7–2	
2	Butler	6–3	
3	Villanova	5–3–1	1–0 vs. CRE
4	Creighton	5–3–1	0–1 vs. NOVA
5	Xavier	4–4–1	
6	DePaul	4–5	

== Bracket ==
Quarterfinals; Sunday, November 6
4	Creighton	3
5	Xavier	1
3	Villanova (pen.)	0 (3)
6	DePaul	0 (1)

Semifinals; Thursday, November 10
1	Providence	1
4	Creighton	2
2	Butler (2OT)	1
3	Villanova	0

Finals; Sunday, November 13
4	Creighton	1
2	Butler	2
