= Nassau County Aquatics Center =

Aquatic facility in East Meadow, New York

Coordinates: 40.728277°N 73.576224°W

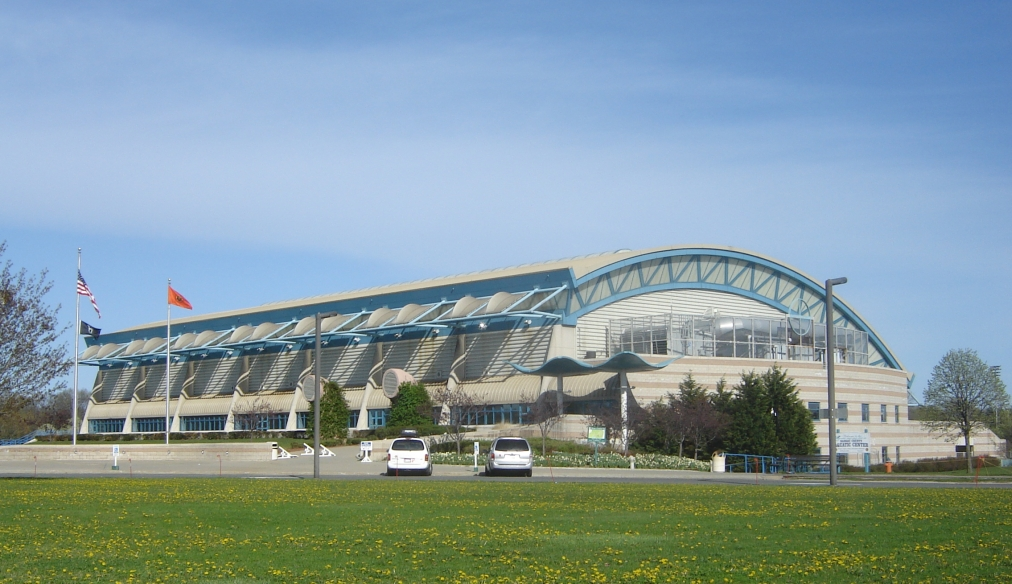
- Nassau County Aquatics Center in May 2007
- Interactive map of Nassau County Aquatics Center
- Full name: Nassau County Aquatics Center at Eisenhower Park
- Address: East Meadow, NY, United States
- Capacity: 3,300
- Pool size: Length: 68 m (223 ft); Width: 25 m (82 ft); Depth: 0.0–7.6 m (0–25 ft)

Construction
- Built: 1998
- Opened: 1998
- Cost: $30 million USD

Tenants
- Excel Swimming, High Dive Champions, Long Island Aquatic Club, Long Island Divers, New York Dive Club

The Nassau County Aquatics Center – formally known as the Nassau County Aquatics Center at Eisenhower Park and colloquially as the Eisenhower Park Pool – is an aquatic facility located at Eisenhower Park within the hamlet of East Meadow, in Nassau County, New York, United States. It is considered the largest Olympic-sized single-tank pool in North America.

At least 16 world records in swimming have been set in the facility.

== History ==
The Nassau County Aquatics Center was built in 1998 for the Goodwill Games. Since the Goodwill Games in 1998, it has hosted numerous swimming and diving championships and high level competitions including the USA Swimming National Championship, NCAA Division I Men's Swimming and Diving Championships, NCAA Division I Women's Swimming and Diving Championships, Big East Conference Swimming & Diving Championships, (16 times), and FINA World Cup.

The center is 80,000 square feet (7,400 m^{2}) with a 68-metre (223 ft) pool and three moveable bulkheads to accommodate SCM, SCY, and LCM competition. In 2002, Natalie Coughlin set multiple world records during the FINA World Cup at the center. In 2002 it was reported that the pool had lost millions of dollars. Dave Ferris was aquatics director in 2002, he reportedly questioned the reported losses, stating that "I don't believe expenses on the building are completely clear at this time". In 2011, the facility underwent a renovation after a 40-pound light fixture fell about 55 feet (17 m) into the swimming pool.

Since 2011, it had also been proposed to build an additional, 50-metre (160 ft) outdoor pool adjacent to the existing facility.

== See also ==
- Swimming at the Goodwill Games
