= 2015 Big East Conference men's soccer tournament =

2015 Big East men's soccer tournament
Tournament details
- Country: United States
- Teams: 6

Final positions
- Champions: Georgetown
- Runners-up: Creighton

Tournament statistics
- Matches played: 5
- Goals scored: 14 (2.8 per match)
- Top goal scorer: Brandon Allen (2)

Awards
- Best player: Brandon Allen (offense); Joshua Yaro (defense)

The 2015 Big East men's soccer tournament, was the third men's soccer tournament of the new Big East Conference, formed in July 2013 after the original Big East Conference split into two leagues along football lines. Including the history of the original conference, it was the 20th edition of the Big East tournament.

== Qualification ==
2015 Big East Conference men's soccer standings
| | Conf. | | | | | Overall |
| Team | W | | L | | T | W | | L | | T |
|---|---|---|---|---|---|---|---|---|---|---|
| No. 2 Georgetown ‡ | 9 | – | 0 | – | 0 | 16 | – | 2 | – | 3 |
| No. 9 Creighton + | 7 | – | 2 | – | 0 | 19 | – | 4 | – | 0 |
| Butler | 6 | – | 3 | – | 0 | 10 | – | 4 | – | 4 |
| Xavier | 5 | – | 3 | – | 1 | 11 | – | 6 | – | 1 |
| Providence | 4 | – | 4 | – | 1 | 8 | – | 7 | – | 2 |
| DePaul | 4 | – | 4 | – | 1 | 5 | – | 12 | – | 1 |
| Villanova | 4 | – | 5 | – | 0 | 9 | – | 8 | – | 0 |
| Saint John's | 2 | – | 5 | – | 2 | 4 | – | 11 | – | 3 |
| Marquette | 1 | – | 7 | – | 1 | 5 | – | 10 | – | 2 |
| Seton Hall | 0 | – | 9 | – | 0 | 0 | – | 15 | – | 1 |
‡-Tournament champion +- Invited to the NCAA Division I Men's Soccer Championship; As of December 5, 2015; Rankings from NSCAA

The top six teams in the Big East Conference based on their conference regular season records qualified for the tournament.

== Bracket ==
First Round
4 | Xavier | 2
5 | DePaul | 1
3 | Butler | 2 (2)
6 | Providence (pen.) | 2 (4)

Semifinals
1 | Georgetown | 1
4 | Xavier | 0
2 | Creighton | 2
6 | Providence | 1

Final
1 | Georgetown (2OT) | 2
2 | Creighton | 1

== Schedule ==
=== Quarterfinals ===
| November 8 | Butler | 2–2 (a.e.t.) (2–4 p) | Providence | Indianapolis, Indiana |
| 13:00 ET | Goldsmith 67', 81' | Report | Steeves 11'; Drew 89' | Stadium: Butler Bowl; Attendance: 445; Referee: Ben Trivino |
| | Penalties |
| | Goldsmith (penalty missed); Adkins (penalty scored); Constantino (penalty missed); Timmer (penalty scored) | | (penalty scored) Gressel; (penalty missed) Steeves; (penalty scored) Sousa; (penalty scored) Machado; (penalty scored) Mendoca |

| November 8 | Xavier | 2–1 | DePaul | Cincinnati, Ohio |
| 16:00 ET | Andriot 31'; Ridsdale 48' | Report | Harvey 15' | Stadium: XU Soccer Complex; Attendance: 865; Referee: Karl Braun |

=== Semi-finals ===
| November 12 | Georgetown | 1–0 | Xavier | Washington, D.C. |
| 14:00 ET | Allen 16' | Report | | Stadium: Shaw Field; Attendance: 771; Referee: Jorge Luna Hernandez |

| November 12 | Creighton | 2–1 | Providence | Omaha, Nebraska |
| 20:00 ET | Rydstrand 33'; Herbers 67' | Report | Gressel 55' (pen.) | Stadium: Morrison Stadium; Attendance: 1,976; Referee: Edwin Jurisevic |

=== Big East Championship ===
| November 15 | Georgetown | 2–1 (a.e.t.) | Creighton | Washington, D.C. |
| 12:00 ET | Allen 20'; Muyl 107' | Report | Pitter 17' | Stadium: Shaw Field; Attendance: 1,541; Referee: Khalaf Al-Latayfeh |

== Statistical leaders ==
=== Top goalscorers ===
| Rank | Player | Club | Goals |

== Honors ==
=== All-Tournament team ===
- Cory Brown, Xavier, So., D
- Todd Pratzner, Xavier, Jr., D
- Jeff Kilday, Providence, RS-Sr., M
- Julian Gressel, Providence, Jr., M
- Fabian Herbers, Creighton, Jr., M/F
- Ricardo Perez, Creighton, Jr., M/F
- Connor Sparrow, Creighton, Sr., GK
- JT Marcinkowski, Georgetown, Fr., GK
- Brandon Allen, Georgetown, Sr., F
- Joshua Yaro, Georgetown, Jr., D
- Alex Muyl, Georgetown, Jr., F

=== Tournament MVPs ===
- most outstanding defensive player: Joshua Yaro, Georgetown
- most outstanding offensive player: Brandon Allen, Georgetown

== See also ==
- Big East Conference
- 2015 Big East Conference men's soccer season
- 2015 NCAA Division I men's soccer season
- 2015 NCAA Division I Men's Soccer Championship
