= Louis Bennett (soccer) =

American soccer player and coach

Personal information
- Place of birth: England
- Position: Midfielder

Team information
- Current team: Marquette Golden Eagles (head coach)

Youth career
- 1979–1982: Crewe & Alsagar College

Senior career*
| Years | Team | Apps | (Gls) |
| 1984–1987 | Milwaukee Wave (indoor) | 80 | (46) |

Managerial career
- 1993–1995: Milwaukee Panthers (assistant)
- 1996–2005: Milwaukee Panthers
- 2006–: Marquette Golden Eagles
- * Club domestic league appearances and goals

Louis Bennett is an English-American soccer coach who played professionally in the American Indoor Soccer Association. He is the head coach at Marquette University.

== Player ==
In 1984, Bennett signed with the Milwaukee Wave of the American Indoor Soccer Association. He played a total of three seasons with the Wave. Also played with the Dayton Dynamo & Memphis Rogues

== Coach ==
=== University of Wisconsin-Milwaukee ===
He served as the head men's soccer coach at the University of Wisconsin–Milwaukee from 1996 to 2005. He led the Panthers to a 136–63–17 record during his tenure. He led UW-Milwaukee to five straight NCAA tournament appearances, including 4 straight in which the team made the second round. His team absolutely dominated the Horizon League, posting a 41–4–2 record with 5 conference titles since 2001.

The Panthers also went 14–1 in the Horizon tournament, and won 4 tournament crowns during that span. His 2002 team went 19–2–1, and set the school record with a national ranking of 8. For his effort, he was named Horizon League Coach of the year that season. He won five Horizon League Coach of the Year awards during his stay with the Panthers.

He had previously served as an assistant coach with the UW-Milwaukee program from 1993 to 1995.

=== Marquette University ===
He is the head men's soccer coach at Marquette University, a position he has held since 2006. He has compiled a 10–48–12 record in his four years there. Despite his record, his teams have shown improvement each year, increasing their number of wins. As of 2006 his overall coaching record stands at 146–111–29.

His tenure is greatly supported by his assistant coaches' recruiting efforts. He brought in multiple classes of stellar student athletes that have won the program, two Big East titles.
