= Cory Brown =

New Zealand footballer

Personal information
- Full name: Cory James Brown
- Date of birth: 3 April 1996 (age 30)
- Place of birth: Nelson, New Zealand
- Height: 1.77 m (5 ft 9 1/2 in)
- Position: Defender

Team information
- Current team: Tasman United
- Number: 17

Youth career
- Island Bay United
- Hamilton Wanderers AFC

College career
Years	Team	Apps	(Gls)
2014–2017	Xavier Musketeers	80	(5)

Senior career*
Years	Team	Apps	(Gls)
2013–2014	Wanderers SC	10	(0)
2015	Wanderers SC	2	(0)
2017	Michigan Stars	2	(0)
2017	Michigan Bucks	0	(0)
2018	Fresno FC	14	(0)
2019–	Tasman United	7	(0)

International career
2013	New Zealand U-17	6	(0)
2014–2015	New Zealand U-20	3	(0)
- * Club domestic league appearances and goals as of 4 February 2020

Cory James Brown (born 3 April 1996) is a New Zealand footballer who plays for Tasman United.

== Career ==
Brown spent time in his native New Zealand, playing semi-professionally, Brown moved to the United States to play college soccer at Xavier University. He played for four years with the Musketeers, scoring 5 goals and tallying 9 assists in 80 appearances.

Brown also appeared for USL PDL side Michigan Bucks, and NPSL side Michigan Stars.

=== Professional ===
On 21 January 2018, Brown was selected with the 62nd overall pick of the 2018 MLS SuperDraft by Vancouver Whitecaps FC. Brown signed with Vancouver's United Soccer League affiliate Fresno FC on 20 March 2018.
