= Brian Wiese =

American soccer coach

Personal information
- Full name: Brian Wiese
- Date of birth: c. June 6, 1973 (age 53)
- Position: Goalkeeper

Team information
- Current team: Georgetown University

Youth career
- 1991–1993: Dartmouth

Senior career*
Years	Team	Apps	(Gls)
1995	Highlanders F.C.		

Managerial career
- 1996–2000: Stanford Cardinal (assistant)
- 2001–2005: Notre Dame Fighting Irish (assistant)
- 2006–: Georgetown Hoyas
- * Club domestic league appearances and goals

Brian Wiese is the head men's soccer coach at Georgetown. He has coached at Georgetown since 2006. He also served as a top assistant coach at Stanford, and Notre Dame. While an assistant, those squads went a combined 136–48–25, including nine straight tournament appearances. From 1996 to 2001, he served as an assistant coach at Stanford, where the team posted a 71–21–12 record.

He graduated from Dartmouth College in 1995, where he earned a bachelor's degree in mechanical engineering.
