= Georgetown Hoyas men's soccer =

American college soccer team

- 2026 Georgetown Hoyas men's soccer team
- Founded: 1952; 74 years ago
- University: Georgetown University
- Athletic director: Lee Reed
- Head coach: Brian Wiese (21st season)
- Conference: Big East
- Location: Washington, District of Columbia, US
- Stadium: Shaw Field (capacity: 1,625)
- Nickname: Hoyas
- Colors: Navy, white, and grey
Home	Away

NCAA tournament championships
- 2019

NCAA tournament runner-up
- 2012

NCAA tournament College Cup
- 2012, 2019, 2021

NCAA tournament Quarterfinals
- 2012, 2014, 2019, 2021, 2025

NCAA tournament Round of 16
- 2012, 2013, 2014, 2015, 2018, 2019, 2021, 2025

NCAA tournament Round of 32
- 1997, 2010, 2012, 2013, 2014, 2015, 2017, 2018, 2019, 2021, 2023, 2024, 2025

NCAA tournament appearances
- 1994, 1997, 2010, 2012, 2013, 2014, 2015, 2017, 2018, 2019, 2020, 2021, 2022, 2023, 2024, 2025

Conference tournament championships
- 2015, 2017, 2018, 2019, 2021, 2024, 2025

Conference regular season championships
- 1994, 2010, 2012, 2013, 2015, 2018, 2019, 2020, 2021, 2023, 2025, 2026

The Georgetown Hoyas men's soccer team represents Georgetown University in all men's Division I NCAA soccer competitions. The Georgetown Hoyas joined the new Big East Conference on July 1, 2013, with other private schools from the former Big East Conference in which they previously competed.

They won an NCAA national championship in 2019, and was the national runner-up in 2012. As of 2025, the Hoyas have made nine total appearances in the NCAA tournament, and have won the Big East conference tournament seven times and the regular season title twelve times.

== Stadium ==
Shaw Field is home of Georgetown men's and women's soccer. The teams began practice on the field in 1996, but did not play their first game until the 2001 fall season.

The field surface is natural Bermuda grass, and the facility possesses a seating capacity of 1,625. The complex is located above Yates Field House between Kehoe Field and the Georgetown Medical School. Georgetown holds a record of 97-33-15 (as of 2015) at Shaw Field.

== Players ==
=== Current roster ===
As of 26 July 2026

Note: Flags indicate national team as defined under FIFA eligibility rules; some limited exceptions apply. Players may hold more than one non-FIFA nationality.

No.	Pos.	Nation	Player
0	GK	USA	Emmanuel Marmolejo
1	GK	USA	Charlie DeMarco
2	DF	USA	Jack Lindimore
3	MF	USA	Eric Howard
4	DF	USA	Oliver Stafford
5	DF	ENG	Will Caldwell
6	MF	USA	Aidan Godinho
7	FW	ENG	Jordi Sada-Paz
8	MF	USA	Matthew Van Horn
9	FW	IDN	Mitchell Baker
10	MF	USA	Mateo Ponce Ocampo
11	MF	USA	David Urrutia
12	MF	USA	Casey Milliken
13	MF	USA	Terrance Reynolds

No.	Pos.	Nation	Player
14	MF	USA	Noah Satriano
15	MF	GRE	Loukas Maroutsis
16	MF	USA	Jack Brown
17	DF	USA	Kamil Abdul Nafeo
18	MF	USA	Max Nelsen
19	MF	USA	Charlie Rosenthal
20	MF	USA	Matthew Helfrich
21	MF	BAN	Zayan Ahmed
22	MF	USA	Jack Heaps
23	MF	USA	Andrew Richman
25	DF	USA	Tate Lampman
27	FW	POL	Stanislav Rzeznik
28	MF	USA	Noah Strellnauer
30	GK	UKR	Dmytro Torubara

=== Notable alumni ===
Name	Professional team	Year
Tim Keegan	Delaware Wizards/WDA Swiece (Poland)	1995
Phil Wellington	Kansas City Wiz	1996
Brandon Lieb	DC United	1997
Eric Kvello	NY-NJ Metrostars	1999
Dan Gargan	Colorado Rapids	2005
Jeff Curtin	Chicago Fire	2006
Ricky Schramm	DC United	2007
Tommy Muller	San Jose Earthquakes	2012
Jimmy Nealis	Houston Dynamo	2012
Andy Riemer	Los Angeles Galaxy	2012
Steve Neumann	New England Revolution	2013
Joey Dillon	Real Salt Lake	2013
Tomas Gomez	Columbus Crew	2014
Tyler Rudy	New England Revolution	2014
Brandon Allen	New York Red Bulls	2015
Alex Muyl	New York Red Bulls	2015
Keegan Rosenberry	Philadelphia Union	2015
Cole Seiler	Vancouver Whitecaps	2015
Josh Turnley	Los Angeles Galaxy	2015
Josh Yaro	Philadelphia Union	2015
JT Marcinkowski	San Jose Earthquakes	2017
Dylan Nealis	Inter Miami CF	2019
Jacob Montes	Crystal Palace FC	2019
Achara	Toronto FC	2019
Paul Rothrock	Toronto FC	2020
Dante Polvara	Aberdeen FC	2021
Sean Zawadski	Columbus Crew	2021
Kieran Sargeant	Houston Dynamo	2023

== Coaches ==
=== Head coach history ===
Tenure	Name
1952–1953	Rev. Frederick Brew
1954	Robert Windish
1955–1957	Dan Mulcahy
1958–1960	Steve Benedik
1961–1965	Bill Lauritzen
1966–1969	Ricardo Mendoza
1970–1974	Paul Kennedy
1975–1976	Bill Smith
1977–1979	Tim Cooney
1980	Scott Strasburg
1981–1983	Mike Dillon
1984–2005	Keith Tabatznik
2006–present	Brian Wiese

== Titles ==
=== National ===
Championship	Title #	Season	Score (final)	Rival	Venue
NCAA tournament	1	2019	3–3 (7–6 p)	Virginia	WakeMed Soccer Park

=== Conference ===
Conference	Championship	Titles	Winning years
Big East	Tournament	7	2015, 2017, 2018, 2019, 2021, 2024, 2025
Big East	Regular season	12	1985, 1998, 2000, 2001, 2013, 2015, 2019, 2020, 2021, 2022, 2023, 2025

== Seasons ==
=== 1994 season ===
In 1994, the Hoyas achieved an 18–4 record and the school's first-ever berth in the NCAA Championship as well as its first Big East regular season title. Keith Tabatznik was named the South Atlantic Region and Big East Coach of the Year.

=== 1997 season ===
GU captured its first-ever NCAA Tournament victory with a 2–1 triumph over Virginia Commonwealth on November 23. The Hoyas finished 1997 with a 15–7 overall record and were second in the competitive Big East Conference with a 9–2 mark.

=== 2012 season ===
Georgetown broke onto the national stage in 2012, the most successful season to date in program history. The Hoyas went 19-4-3 with a mark of 6-2-0 in the Big East Conference. The squad was the third overall seed in the NCAA Tournament and the 19 wins were the most in program history. The Hoyas were the Big East Blue Division Champions, the Big East Championship runners-up and advanced to the national championship game in penalty kicks in a game against the University of Maryland. The Hoyas were runners-up to Indiana in the 2012 NCAA Division I Men's Soccer Championship. Brian Wiese was selected as National Coach of the Year.

=== 2015 season ===
After opening the season 0-2-1, Georgetown went on a program record 18-game unbeaten streak including a 14-game win streak. Along the way, the Hoyas won the Big East Regular Season title with a perfect 9-0-0 record. It was the fifth time in program history that the Hoyas have won the regular season championship. Georgetown also won the Big East Championship crown by beating Creighton, marking the first time in program history that the Hoyas won the league's postseason tournament.

== See also ==
- Sports in Washington, D.C.
