= Marquette Golden Eagles men's soccer =

American college soccer team

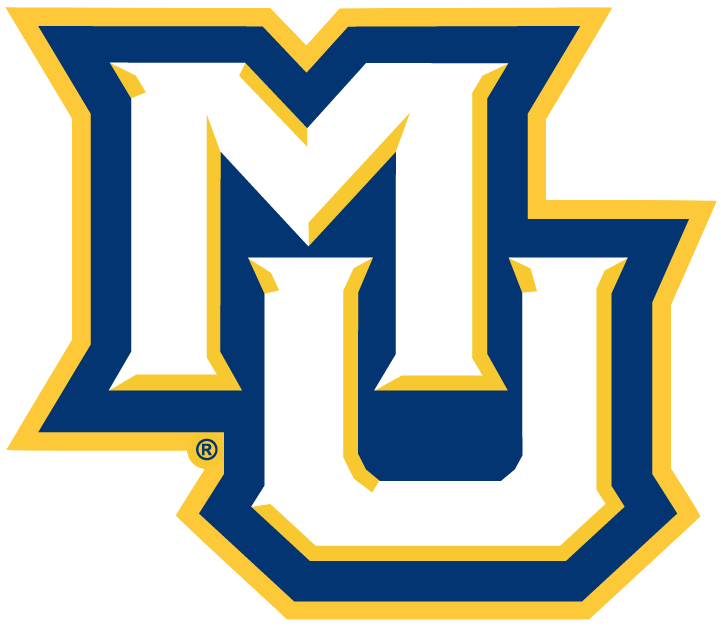
- Founded: 1964; 62 years ago
- University: Marquette University
- Head coach: Louis Bennett (14th season)
- Conference: Big East
- Location: Milwaukee, Wisconsin, US
- Stadium: Valley Fields (capacity: 1,600)
- Nickname: Golden Eagles
- Colors: Blue and gold
Home	Away

NCAA tournament Round of 16
- 2013, 2020

NCAA tournament Round of 32
- 2012, 2013, 2020

NCAA tournament appearances
- 1997, 2012, 2013, 2020

Conference tournament championships
- 2013

Conference Regular Season championships
- 1997, 2002, 2011, 2013, 2020 (East Division)

The Marquette Golden Eagles men's soccer program represents the Marquette University in all NCAA Division I men's college soccer competitions. Founded in 1964, the Golden Eagles compete in the Big East Conference. The Golden Eagles are coached by Louis Bennett. Marquette plays its home matches at Valley Fields.

== Postseason tournament history ==
=== NCAA Tournament ===
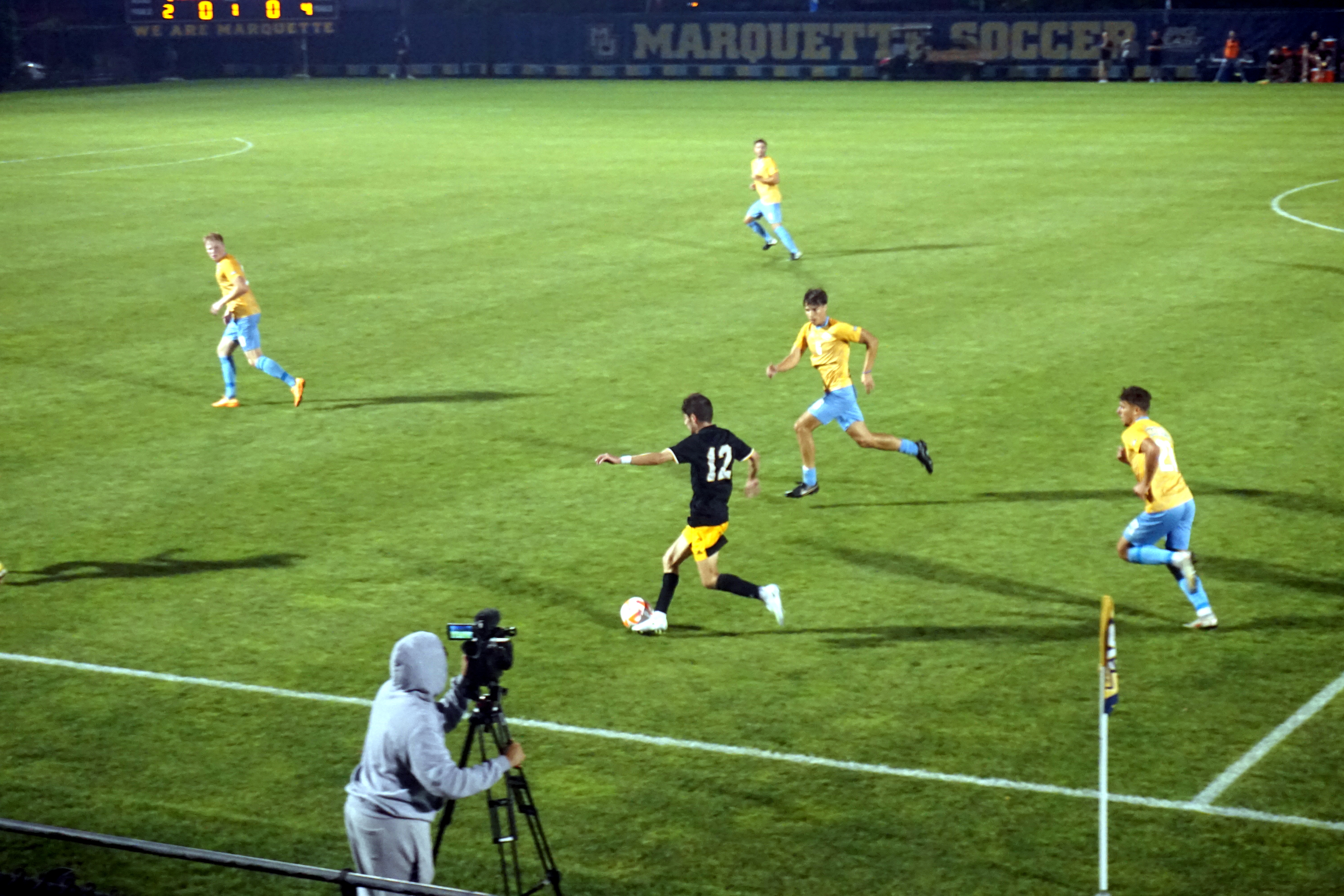
Marquette (in gold) v Milwaukee in 2023

Marquette has appeared in four NCAA tournaments. Its best performances came in the 2013 and 2020 tournaments, reaching the round of 16 in both.

The 2020 tournament was delayed to the spring of 2021 by the COVID-19 pandemic.

Year	Record	Seed	Region	Round	Rival	Score(s)
1997	13–5–3	—N/a	Bloomington	First round	Bowling Green	0–1
2012	16–3–1	7	4	Second round	Northwestern	0–1
2013	12–5–2	9	1	Second round Third round	Akron; No. 8 Virginia	1–0 (a.e.t.); 1–3
2020	8-3-2	—N/a	—N/a	Second round Third round	Loyola Marymount; No. 3 Indiana	0–0 (3-1 p); 1–2

== Honours ==
- Big East Conference Regular Season
  - Winners (3): 2011, 2013, 2020 (East Division)
- Big East Conference Men's Soccer Tournament
  - Winners (1): 2013
- Conference USA Regular Season
  - Winners (2): 1997, 2002
