= Big East Conference =

U.S. college athletic conference that began in 2013

- Association: NCAA
- Founded: May 31, 1979; 47 years ago (de facto); July 1, 2013; 13 years ago (de jure) (Note: The "Big East Conference" legal charter established the conference on July 1st 2013. The American Athletic Conference remains the legal all-sports successor to the "Big East Conference (1979–2013)". The "Big East Conference (1979-2013)" was rebranded and reorganized as the American Athletic Conference on July 1, 2013. The Big East Conference purchased the rights to the history of the "Big East Conference (1979-2013)" and thus also claims its de facto founding date as May 31st 1979)
- Commissioner: Tim Brosnan
- Sports fielded: 22; men's: 10; women's: 12
- Division: Division I (Non-Football)
- No. of teams: 11 (All-Sports Members)
- Headquarters: New York City
- Region: Northeastern United States; Midwestern United States
- Broadcasters: Fox/FS1 NBC/Peacock/NBCSN; TNT Sports ESPN
- Website: bigeast.com

Locations

The Big East Conference (stylized as BIG EAST) is a collegiate athletic conference that competes in NCAA Division I in 10 men's sports and 12 women's sports. Headquartered in New York City, the 11 full-member schools are primarily located in Northeast and Midwest metropolitan areas. The conference was officially recognized as a Division I multi-sport conference on August 1, 2013, and since then conference members have won NCAA national championships in men's basketball, women's basketball, women's cross country, field hockey, men's lacrosse, and men's soccer. Val Ackerman is the commissioner.

The conference was formed after the "Catholic Seven" members of the original Big East Conference elected to split from the football-playing schools in order to start a new conference focused on basketball. These schools (DePaul, Georgetown, Marquette, Providence, Seton Hall, St. John's, and Villanova) had announced their decision in December 2012. In March 2013, the new conference purchased the Big East Conference name, logos, basketball records, and the rights to the Big East Men's Basketball Tournament at Madison Square Garden from the football-playing members of the old Big East, who formed what is now known as the American Conference (American), (Note: This conference was known as the American Athletic Conference before July 2025.) which is the old conference's legal successor. Both conferences share 1979 as their founding date, when the original conference was founded by Dave Gavitt, and the same history through 2013.

Three more schools, Butler, Creighton, and Xavier, joined the conference on its July 1, 2013, launch date. In June 2019, the Big East invited the University of Connecticut (UConn) to "re-join" the conference from the American, which it did on July 1, 2020. Football is not a sponsored sport, and UConn is the only member with a varsity football team in the top-level Division I FBS. Butler, Georgetown, and Villanova do operate football programs in the second-level Division I FCS. The conference also has four associate members in field hockey, and one in men's and women's lacrosse.

== History ==
=== The original Big East ===
The original Big East Conference was founded in 1979, when Providence College basketball coach Dave Gavitt spearheaded an effort to assemble an east coast basketball-centric collegiate athletic conference. The core of the Big East formed when Providence, St. John's, Georgetown, and Syracuse invited Seton Hall, Connecticut (UConn), Holy Cross, Rutgers, and Boston College (BC). Holy Cross turned down the invitation, as did Rutgers initially, while BC, Seton Hall, and UConn accepted. Gavitt became the Big East's first commissioner, and Villanova and Pittsburgh joined the conference shortly thereafter. PR firm Duffy & Shanley is credited with the initial branding and naming work for the conference. The "high point" of the original conference is widely considered to be the 1985 NCAA tournament, in which Georgetown, St. Johns, and Villanova all made the Final Four, and Villanova defeated Georgetown to win the national championship.

The conference remained largely unchanged until 1991, when it began to sponsor football, adding Miami as a full member, and Rutgers, Temple, Virginia Tech, and West Virginia as football-only members. Rutgers and West Virginia upgraded to full Big East membership in 1995, while Virginia Tech did the same in 2000. Notre Dame also joined as a non-football member effective in 1995. Temple football was kicked out after the 2004 season due to what was deemed by the other football-playing members a failure to make a strong effort to field a competitive team, but rejoined in 2012 after seriously upgrading its football program and intended to become a full Big East member in 2013.

The unusual structure of the Big East, with the "football" and "non-football" schools, led to instability in the conference. The Big East was one of the most severely impacted conferences during conference realignment of 2005 and the early 2010s. In all, 14 member schools announced their departure for other conferences, and 15 other schools announced plans to join the conference (eight as all-sports members, and four for football only). Three of the latter group later backed out of their plans to join (one for all sports, and the other two for football only). These waves of defection and replacement revealed tension between the football-sponsoring and non-football schools that eventually led to the split of the conference in 2013.

=== Split and re-founding ===
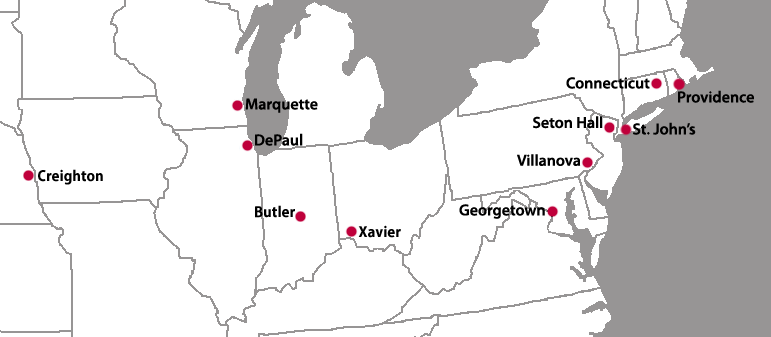
Locations of the current Big East Conference member institutions

On December 15, 2012, the Big East's seven non-FBS schools – DePaul, Georgetown, Marquette, Providence, St. John's, Seton Hall, and Villanova – announced that they had voted unanimously to separate from the Big East football-playing schools. The schools splitting away were referred to as the "Catholic 7" due to their common religious background, and were motivated in part by a desire to return to Gavitt's original vision of a strong, Northeast-based and basketball-focused conference, and by prospects of a better television deal than they would have received by remaining with the football schools. The move occurred during a limited window in which these non-FBS schools held a voting majority in the conference—after the defection of certain FBS schools to the ACC but before the effective inclusion of candidate FBS schools to replace them.

Negotiations with the other member schools continued in early 2013, and in March, it was reported that the "Catholic 7" schools would leave the conference on June 30, 2013, but that they would retain the Big East Conference name, logos, $10 million from the old conference's treasury, and the right to hold their Big East Men's Basketball Tournament at Madison Square Garden. At a March 20 news conference in New York City, Georgetown President John J. DeGioia, representing this new conference, announced that Butler University and Xavier University, both then members of the Atlantic 10 Conference, as well as Creighton University in the Missouri Valley Conference would also join the new league at its launch. Additional announcements confirmed their headquarters in New York City, and a 12-year, $500 million television contract with Fox Sports and its networks, and a 6-year television contract with CBS and its CBS Sports Network. On June 26, 2013, the new conference hired Val Ackerman, former WNBA president, as the conference's first commissioner.

=== Field hockey and lacrosse associate members ===
The remaining members of the old conference later announced they would continue as the American Athletic Conference (AAC), which changed its name to American Conference in July 2025. Several AAC and former Big East schools however continued playing lacrosse and field hockey with the new Big East Conference in 2013, including Rutgers and Louisville, before moving their programs to the Big Ten and Atlantic Coast Conferences respectively in 2014–15. AAC members UConn and Temple also both joined the new Big East for women's lacrosse and field hockey, while Cincinnati joined the women's lacrosse league, Denver joined the men's lacrosse league, and Old Dominion joined the field hockey league.

The launch of a women's lacrosse league in the Big Ten for the 2015 season caused the American Lacrosse Conference (ALC) to dissolve after the 2014 season; two Southeastern Conference teams that had been ALC members, Florida and Vanderbilt, joined the Big East as associate members in that sport. The next changes to Big East associate membership came during the 2015–16 school year. First, on December 8, 2015, the conference announced that Liberty and Quinnipiac would become associate members in field hockey effective with the 2016 season. Then, on May 3, 2016, the Big East announced that Denver, already an affiliate in men's lacrosse, would move its women's lacrosse team into the league in the 2016–17 school year (2017 season). In addition to the new associate members, full member Butler announced on October 21, 2015, that it would elevate its club team in women's lacrosse to full varsity status in the 2017 season and immediately begin Big East competition.

The American Conference began sponsoring women's lacrosse in the 2019 season (2018–19 school year), which led to the departure of all then-current Big East women's lacrosse associates except Denver. On that same date, the Big East announced that field hockey member Old Dominion would also become a Big East women's lacrosse member in the 2019 season, maintaining Big East women's lacrosse membership at 6 teams and preserving its automatic berth to the NCAA women's tournament.

=== Return of UConn ===
Big East Conference Member locations
– Full member
– Associate member, field hockey
– Associate member, men's soccer
Not shown: Associate member Denver (Men's and women's lacrosse)

In June 2019, various news outlets reported that UConn would soon leave the AAC for the Big East, pending a decision on the future of the school's football program. Many news stories described UConn as "rejoining" the Big East, because UConn was a founding member of the original Big East, but remained with the football-playing members when the conference reorganized as the AAC in 2013. By 2018 however, UConn had seen a dramatic decline in athletic department revenues. Mutual interest between UConn and the new Big East had been reported by several sources starting in 2016.

On June 24, 2019, the Big East formally approved an invitation for UConn to join the conference. The UConn Board of Trustees accepted the invitation two days later, thus reuniting UConn with several of the schools against whom it competed for 34 years in the old Big East. UConn and the AAC reached a buyout agreement the following month, clearing the way for UConn to become a member of the Big East on July 1, 2020. At the time the buyout agreement was reported, UConn announced that its football team would become an FBS independent upon its arrival in the Big East, leaving Temple as the only AAC member in the northeast. UConn's men's & women's hockey teams remain a member of the Hockey East Association. In 2020, Old Dominion's women's lacrosse left the Big East for the AAC, essentially swapping places with UConn, so both conferences maintained the six members required for an automatic bid.

=== Associate Member Changes ===
On November 16, 2022, the Big East announced that The University of Akron would join as an associate member in men's soccer for the 2023-24 season, following the suspension of the Mid-American Conference men's soccer league.

On November 10, 2025, Quinnipiac University announced that it would depart the Big East in field hockey for the Northeast Conference following the 2025-26 season.

== Commissioners ==
The office of the commissioner of athletics was created in 1979

Name	Years	Notes
Dave Gavitt	1979–1990	Former Providence College Head Coach and Athletic Director. Founder of the Big East Conference. Inducted into the Basketball Hall of Fame in 2006. Inducted into the College Basketball Hall of Fame in 2006. Namesake of the Dave Gavitt Trophy, given to the winner of the Big East Men's Basketball Tournament.
Mike Tranghese	1990–2009	Retired in 2009
John Marinatto	2009–2012	Resigned May 7, 2012
Joseph Bailey	2012	Interim Commissioner Following Marinatto's Resignation
Michael Aresco	2012–2013	Former Commissioner of the American Athletic Conference, The Original Big East's successor
Val Ackerman	2013–2026	Former President of the WNBA. First Commissioner of the Newly Recognized Big East.
Tim Brosnan	2026–present	

== Academics ==
The following table shows National University rank by U.S. News & World Report as of 2027. Providence College is ranked 3rd within the "Regional Universities: North" category.

Also indicated is membership in the Association of American Universities.

Institution	National University Rank	AAU Member
Georgetown University	23	Yes
Villanova University	42	No
University of Connecticut	73	No
Marquette University	90	No
Creighton University	100	No
St. John's University	137	No
Seton Hall University	156	No
Butler University	169	No
DePaul University	169	No
Xavier University	208	No
Providence College	--	No

== Apparel ==
School	Provider
Butler	Nike
Connecticut	Nike
Creighton	Nike
DePaul	Nike
Georgetown	Nike/Jordan
Marquette	Nike/Jordan
Providence	Nike
St. John's	Adidas
Seton Hall	Under Armour
Villanova	Nike
Xavier	Nike

== Member schools ==
=== Full members ===
Nine of the eleven members of the Big East are private, Catholic institutions. The exceptions are Butler, which is nonsectarian (although it was founded by the Christian Church (Disciples of Christ)) and UConn, which is the only public institution.

Institution	Location	Founded	Type	Enrollment	Endowment (millions)	Nickname	Joined (Note: Represents the calendar year when fall sports competition begins.)	Colors
Butler University	Indianapolis, Indiana	1855	Nonsectarian (Note: Historically affiliated with the Christian Church (Disciples of Christ).)	5,763	$326	Bulldogs	2013	
University of Connecticut (UConn)	Storrs, Connecticut	1881	Public	33,554	$669	Huskies	2020 (Note: It was a charter member of the original Big East but when the conference split in 2013, UConn joined the American Athletic Conference (AAC) with other football-playing schools. UConn joined the new Big East in 2020.)	
Creighton University	Omaha, Nebraska	1878	Catholic (Jesuit)	8,770	$745	Bluejays	2013	
DePaul University	Chicago, Illinois	1898	Catholic (Vincentian)	21,210	$1,080	Blue Demons	2013 (Note: It was a member of the original Big East between 2005 and 2013. It is one of the Catholic 7 schools that led the creation of the new Big East in 2013.)	
Georgetown University	Washington, D.C.	1789	Catholic (Jesuit)	20,023	$3,638	Hoyas	2013 (Note: It was a charter member of the original Big East. It is one of the Catholic 7 schools that led the creation of the new Big East in 2013.)	
Marquette University	Milwaukee, Wisconsin	1881	Catholic (Jesuit)	11,550	$997	Golden Eagles	2013	
Providence College	Providence, Rhode Island	1917	Catholic (Dominican)	4,816	$321	Friars	2013	
St. John's University	Queens, New York	1870	Catholic (Vincentian)	19,691	$1,660	Red Storm	2013	
Seton Hall University	South Orange, New Jersey	1856	Catholic (Archdiocese of Newark)	9,815	$308.4	Pirates	2013	
Villanova University	Villanova, Pennsylvania	1842	Catholic (Augustinian)	10,942	$1,310	Wildcats	2013 (Note: It was a member of the original Big East between 1980 and 2013. It is one of the Catholic 7 schools that led the creation of the new Big East in 2013.)	
Xavier University	Cincinnati, Ohio	1831	Catholic (Jesuit)	4,767	$225.4	Musketeers	2013	

=== Associate members ===
Institution	Location	Founded	Type	Enrollment	Nickname	Joined (Note: Represents the calendar year when fall sports competition begins.)	Colors	Big East sport(s)	Primary conference
University of Akron	Akron, Ohio	1870	Public	12,521	Zips	2023		Men's soccer	Mid-American (MAC)
University of Denver	Denver, Colorado	1864	Nonsectarian	13,856	Pioneers	2013		Men's lacrosse	West Coast (WCC)
University of Denver	Denver, Colorado	1864	Nonsectarian	13,856	Pioneers	2016		Women's lacrosse	West Coast (WCC)
Liberty University	Lynchburg, Virginia	1971	Southern; Baptist	16,000 (Note: Liberty claims +100,000 current students, but the vast majority are enrolled in its online degree programs. The table lists residential enrollment.)	Lady Flames (Note: Liberty's men's teams are called the Flames; however, no men's teams are associate members of the Big East.)	2016		Field hockey	Conf. USA (CUSA)
Old Dominion University (Note: Old Dominion previously competed as an associate member of the Big East for women's lacrosse for the 2019 and 2020 spring seasons (2018–19 to 2019–20 school years).)	Norfolk, Virginia	1930	Public	24,286	Monarchs	2013		Field hockey	Sun Belt (SBC)
Temple University (Note: Temple previously competed as an associate member of the Big East for women's lacrosse from the 2014 to 2018 spring seasons (2013–14 to 2017–18 school years).)	Philadelphia, Pennsylvania	1884	Public	37,365	Owls	2013		Field hockey	American

=== Former associate members ===
Because the American Conference did not sponsor lacrosse or field hockey immediately after the Big East split, several schools from The American joined the reconfigured Big East as associate members in those sports. UConn, Louisville, Rutgers, and Temple joined in both women's lacrosse and field hockey, with Rutgers also joining in men's lacrosse, while Cincinnati joined only in women's lacrosse. Among these schools, Louisville and Rutgers were associates only for one season, as both became full members of conferences that sponsored their remaining Big East sports in 2014—respectively the Atlantic Coast Conference and Big Ten Conference. The other named schools stayed in Big East women's lacrosse until the American began a women's lacrosse league in 2018–19.

Institution	Location	Founded	Type	Enrollment	Nickname	Joined (Note: Represents the calendar year when fall sports competition begins.)	Left (Note: Represents the calendar year when spring sports competition ends.)	Colors	Big East sport(s)	Primary conference	Current conference in former Big East sport(s)
University of Cincinnati	Cincinnati, Ohio	1819	Public	46,798	Bearcats	2013	2018		Women's lacrosse	Big 12	
University of Connecticut (Note: UConn's women lacrosse team rejoined the Big East two years later as a full member in 2020. UConn's associate membership status in field hockey was replaced by full membership in 2020.) (UConn)	Storrs, Connecticut	1881	Public	32,669	Huskies	2013	2020		Field hockey	Big East	
University of Connecticut (UConn)	Storrs, Connecticut	1881	Public	32,669	Huskies	2018	2020		Women's lacrosse	Big East	
University of Florida	Gainesville, Florida	1853	Public	57,841	Gators	2014	2018		Women's lacrosse	Southeastern (SEC)	Big 12
University of Louisville	Louisville, Kentucky	1798	Public	23,246	Cardinals	2013	2014		Field hockey	Atlantic Coast (ACC)	
University of Louisville	Louisville, Kentucky	1798	Public	23,246	Cardinals	2013	2014		Women's lacrosse	Atlantic Coast (ACC)	
Old Dominion University (Note: Old Dominion remains in the Big East as an associate member for field hockey.)	Norfolk, Virginia	1930	Public	24,286	Monarchs	2018	2020		Women's lacrosse	Sun Belt (SBC)	American
Quinnipiac University	Hamden, Connecticut	1929	Nonsectarian	9,746	Bobcats	2016	2026		Field hockey	Metro	NEC
Rutgers University	New Brunswick, New Jersey	1766	Public	50,411	Scarlet; Knights	2013	2014		Field hockey	Big Ten	
Rutgers University	New Brunswick, New Jersey	1766	Public	50,411	Scarlet; Knights	2013	2014		Men's lacrosse	Big Ten	
Rutgers University	New Brunswick, New Jersey	1766	Public	50,411	Scarlet; Knights	2013	2014		Women's lacrosse	Big Ten	
Temple University (Note: Temple remains in the Big East as an associate member for field hockey.)	Philadelphia, Pennsylvania	1884	Public	37,365	Owls	2013	2018		Women's lacrosse	American	
Vanderbilt University	Nashville, Tennessee	1873	Nonsectarian	13,537	Commodores	2014	2018		Women's lacrosse	Southeastern (SEC)	American

=== Membership timeline ===
Full member (non-football) Associate member
Other Conference Other Conference
Former members from Big East Conference (1979–2013)

== CNBC list of the most valuable Big East schools ==
Rankings as of December 19, 2025 (2024–2025 academic year)

Big East	NCAA	School	Valuation	Value Change	Revenue	Revenue Change
1	71	UConn Huskies	$249 million	▲40%	$106 million	▲14%

== Men's sports ==
Men's sponsored sports by school
School	Baseball	Basketball	Cross Country	Golf	Lacrosse	Soccer	Swimming & Diving	Tennis	Track & Field (Indoor)	Track & Field (Outdoor)	Total Big East Sports
Butler	Yes	Yes	Yes	Yes	No	Yes	No	Yes	Yes	Yes	8
Creighton	Yes	Yes	Yes	Yes	No	Yes	No	Yes	No	No	6
DePaul	No	Yes	Yes	Yes	No	Yes	No	Yes	Yes	Yes	7
Georgetown	Yes	Yes	Yes	Yes	Yes	Yes	Yes	Yes	Yes	Yes	10
Marquette	No	Yes	Yes	Yes	Yes	Yes	No	Yes	Yes	Yes	8
Providence	No	Yes	Yes	Yes	Yes	Yes	Yes	No	Yes	Yes	8
St. John's	Yes	Yes	No	Yes	Yes	Yes	No	Yes	No	No	6
Seton Hall	Yes	Yes	Yes	Yes	No	Yes	Yes	No	No	No	6
UConn	Yes	Yes	No	Yes	No	Yes	No	No	Yes	Yes	6
Villanova	Yes	Yes	Yes	Yes	Yes	Yes	Yes	Yes	Yes	Yes	10
Xavier	Yes	Yes	Yes	Yes	No	Yes	Yes	Yes	Yes	Yes	9
Totals	8	11	9	11	5+1 (Note: Associate member Denver.)	11+1 (Note: Associate member Akron.)	5	8	8	8	84+2

Men's varsity sports not sponsored by the Big East Conference which are played by Big East schools
School	Fencing	Football (Note: UConn competes at the FBS level, while Butler, Georgetown, and Villanova compete at the FCS level.)	Ice Hockey	Rowing (Note: The only category of rowing governed by the NCAA is women's heavyweight rowing. All other U.S. college rowing is governed by the Intercollegiate Rowing Association.)	Sailing (Note: Sailing is not an NCAA-sanctioned sport, instead being governed by the Inter-Collegiate Sailing Association.)
Butler	No	Pioneer	No	No	No
Georgetown	No	Patriot	No	EARC	MAISA
Providence	No	No	Hockey East	No	No
St. John's	Independent	No	No	No	No
UConn	No	FBS Independent	Hockey East	No	No
Villanova	No	Patriot	No	No	No

=== Basketball ===
Despite the reconfiguration of the conference, the Big East has still been widely considered as one of the "Power 5" basketball conferences. The Big East Men's Basketball Tournament is considered by some to be the most prestigious conference tournament in NCAA Division I. The Tournament has been played at Madison Square Garden, "The World's Most Famous Arena," since 1983, the longest-running conference tournament at any one site in all of college basketball. Beginning with the inaugural 2013–14 season, the conference signed a 12-year deal with Fox Sports to televise Big East Conference games, with CBS Sports also sublicensing select games from Fox. In 2014–15, the Big East had four schools ranked in the top-20 and six schools in the top-30 recruiting classes nationally according to ESPN, Scout, and Rivals rankings. Villanova won the conference's first national championship since realignment in 2016. One year later, in the 2016–17 season, seven of the ten schools (70%) received bids to that year's NCAA Tournament, a record for the highest percentage of members ever sent to one tournament from a single conference. Since realignment, Big East schools have combined for a total of 50 NCAA Tournament bids, five Final Four appearances, and four national championships.

==== Big East Champions and tournament bids ====
Key
**Bold**	Won National Championship

Year	Regular season Champion	Player of the Year	Tournament Champion	Tournament MVP	NCAA Tournament Bids
2013–14	Villanova (5)	Doug McDermott (Creighton)	Providence (2)	Bryce Cotton (Providence)	(2 E) Villanova, (3 W) Creighton, (11 E) Providence, (12 MW) Xavier
2014–15	Villanova (6)	Ryan Arcidiacono (Villanova), Kris Dunn (Providence)	Villanova (2)	Josh Hart (Villanova)	(1 E) Villanova, (4 S) Georgetown, (6 E) Providence, (6 MW) Butler, (6 W) Xavier, (9 S) St. John's
2015–16	Villanova (7)	Kris Dunn (Providence)	Seton Hall (3)	Isaiah Whitehead (Seton Hall)	**(2 S) Villanova**, (2 E) Xavier, (6 MW) Seton Hall, (9 E) Providence, (9 MW) Butler
2016–17	Villanova (8)	Josh Hart (Villanova)	Villanova (3)	Josh Hart (Villanova)	(1 E) Villanova, (4 S) Butler, (6 MW) Creighton, (9 S) Seton Hall, (10 E) Marquette, (11 W) Xavier, (11 E) Providence
2017–18	Xavier (1)	Jalen Brunson (Villanova)	Villanova (4)	Mikal Bridges (Villanova)	**(1 E) Villanova**, (1 W) Xavier, (8 MW) Seton Hall, (8 S) Creighton, (10 E) Butler, (10 W) Providence
2018–19	Villanova (9)	Markus Howard (Marquette)	Villanova (5)	Phil Booth (Villanova)	(5 W) Marquette, (6 S) Villanova, (10 MW) Seton Hall, (11 W) St. John's
2019–20	Creighton (1), Seton Hall (3), Villanova (10)	Myles Powell (Seton Hall)	Canceled due to the COVID-19 pandemic		
2020–21	Villanova (11)	Collin Gillespie (Villanova); Jeremiah Robinson-Earl (Villanova); Sandro Mamukelashvili (Seton Hall)	Georgetown (8)	Dante Harris (Georgetown)	(5 W) Creighton, (5 S) Villanova, (7 E) UConn, (12 E) Georgetown
2021–22	Providence (1)	Collin Gillespie (Villanova)	Villanova (6)	Collin Gillespie (Villanova)	(2 S) Villanova, (4 MW) Providence, (5 W) UConn, (8 S) Seton Hall, (9 MW) Creighton, (9 E) Marquette
2022–23	Marquette (2)	Tyler Kolek (Marquette)	Marquette (1)	Tyler Kolek (Marquette)	(2 E) Marquette, (3 MW) Xavier, **(4 W) UConn**, (6 S) Creighton, (11 E) Providence
2023–24	UConn (11)	Devin Carter (Providence)	UConn (8)	Tristen Newton (UConn)	**(1 E) UConn**, (2 S) Marquette, (3 MW) Creighton
2024–25	St. John's (6)	RJ Luis Jr. (St. John's)	St. John's (4)	RJ Luis Jr. (St. John's)	(2 W) St. John's, (7 S) Marquette, (8 W) UConn, (9 S) Creighton, (11 MW) Xavier

==== All-time wins and NCAA appearances ====
As of 2023–24 season

Team	Records	Win Pct.	NCAA Tournament	NCAA Sweet 16	NCAA Elite 8	NCAA Final Four	NCAA Runner-up	NCAA Champions
Butler	1675–1221	.578	16	6	2	2	2	0
Creighton	1680–1071	.611	25	7	2	0	0	0
DePaul	1516–1122	.575	22	10	3	2	0	0
Georgetown	1722–1156	.598	31	11	9	5	3	1
Marquette	1739–1062	.621	36	17	7	3	1	1
Providence	1336–843	.613	22	6	4	2	0	0
St. John's	1988–1099	.644	30	9	6	2	1	0
Seton Hall	1612–1145	.585	14	4	2	1	1	0
UConn	1839–1016	.644	37	19	13	7	0	6
Villanova	1886–990	.656	41	20	15	7	1	3
Xavier	1611–1086	.597	29	9	3	0	0	0

==== NCAA National Championships ====
School	NCAA Champion	Years	NCAA Runner-up	Years
UConn	6	1999, 2004, 2011, 2014, 2023, 2024	1	2026
Villanova	3	1985, 2016, 2018	1	1971 (Note: Final Four appearance vacated due to NCAA rules violations.)
Georgetown	1	1984	3	1943, 1982, 1985
Marquette	1	1977	1	1974
Butler	0		2	2010, 2011
Seton Hall	0		1	1989
St. John's	0		1	1952
Total	11		10	

=== Soccer ===
All full Big East member schools field men's soccer teams. Akron became an associate member in 2023.

Year	Regular season	Tournament	Runner-up	NCAA Bids
2013	Georgetown	Marquette	Providence	Creighton, Georgetown, Marquette, Providence, St. John's
2014	Creighton	Providence	Xavier	Creighton, Georgetown, Providence, Xavier
2015	Georgetown	Georgetown	Creighton	Creighton, Georgetown
2016	Providence	Butler	Creighton	Butler, Creighton, Providence, Villanova
2017	Butler	Georgetown	Xavier	Butler, Georgetown
2018	Creighton	Georgetown	Marquette	Georgetown
2019	Georgetown	Georgetown	Providence	Butler, Georgetown, Providence, St. John's
2021 (spring)	Georgetown	Seton Hall	Georgetown	Georgetown, Marquette, Seton Hall
2021 (fall)	Georgetown	Georgetown	Providence	Creighton, Georgetown, Providence, St. John's, Villanova
2022	Georgetown	Creighton	Georgetown	Creighton, Georgetown, Seton Hall
2023	Georgetown	Xavier	Georgetown	Georgetown, Xavier
2024	Akron	Georgetown	Providence	Akron, Georgetown, Providence
2025	Georgetown	Georgetown	UConn	Akron, Georgetown, St. John's, Seton Hall, UConn

==== NCAA National Championships ====
School	NCAA Champion	Years	NCAA Runner-up	Years
UConn	2	1981, 2000	0	N/A
Georgetown	1	2019	1	2012
St. John's	1	1996	1	2003
Creighton	0	N/A	1	2000

=== Lacrosse ===
Big East men's lacrosse is made up of charter members Georgetown, Marquette, Providence, St. John's, and Villanova, as well as Denver. NCAA regulations state that there must be six teams for a league to receive an automatic bid to the NCAA tournament, and since Butler, Creighton, DePaul, Seton Hall, and Xavier only field club teams, the Big East had to look elsewhere. Both Denver and Johns Hopkins were rumored as targets for potential invitation and Denver was ultimately invited to join the Big East as a lacrosse-only member. Denver joined the Big East as one of the hottest teams in the country; at the time of the relaunch of the Big East in July 2013, the Pioneers had made six NCAA Tournament appearances in the previous eight seasons and had appeared in two Final Fours in the previous three seasons. The University of Denver houses most of its other sports in The Summit League; most of that league's other teams are closer to that school's Denver campus than the bulk of the Big East. There is still uncertainty to whether or not Butler, Creighton, DePaul, Seton Hall, UConn, or Xavier will elevate their programs from the club level, or if any other programs will receive lacrosse-only invitations.

Year	Regular season	Tournament	Runner-up	NCAA Bids
2012	Notre Dame	Syracuse	St. John's	Notre Dame (final Four), Syracuse (first round)
2013	Syracuse	Syracuse	Villanova	Notre Dame (quarterfinals), Syracuse (finalist)
2014	Denver	Denver	Villanova	Denver (final Four)
2015	Denver	Denver	Georgetown	Denver (National Champion)
2016	Denver	Marquette	Denver	Denver (first round), Marquette (first round)
2017	Denver	Marquette	Providence	Denver (final Four), Marquette (first round)
2018	Denver	Georgetown	Denver	Denver (quarterfinals), Georgetown (first round), Villanova (first round)
2019	Denver	Georgetown	Denver	Georgetown (first round)
2020	Season canceled due to the COVID-19 pandemic			
2021	Denver	Georgetown	Denver	Denver (first round), Georgetown (quarterfinals)
2022	Georgetown	Georgetown	Villanova	Georgetown (quarterfinals)
2023	Georgetown	Georgetown	Denver	Georgetown (quarterfinals)
2024	Denver	Georgetown	Villanova	Denver (semifinals), Georgetown (quarterfinals)
2025	Georgetown and Villanova	Georgetown	Villanova	Georgetown (quarterfinals)

==== NCAA National Championships ====
School	NCAA Champion	Years	NCAA Runner-up	Years
Denver	1	2015	0	N/A

=== Baseball ===
Big East full member schools Butler, Creighton, Georgetown, Seton Hall, St. John's, UConn, Villanova and Xavier all field men's baseball teams. DePaul and Marquette have never fielded Big East baseball teams, while Providence fielded one until 1999 when it was dropped and later replaced with lacrosse.

Year	Regular season	Tournament	NCAA Bids	Tournament Venue
2014	Creighton	Xavier	Xavier	MCU Park (Brooklyn, NY)
2015	St. John's	St. John's	St. John's	TD Ameritrade Park (Omaha, NE)
2016	Xavier	Xavier	Xavier	Ripken Stadium (Aberdeen, MD)
2017	Creighton	Xavier	Xavier, St. John's	TD Ameritrade Park (Omaha, NE)
2018	St. John's	St. John's	St. John's	Prasco Park (Mason, OH)
2019	Creighton	Creighton	Creighton	Prasco Park (Mason, OH)
2020	Season canceled due to the COVID-19 pandemic			Prasco Park (Mason, OH)
2021	UConn	UConn	UConn	Prasco Park (Mason, OH)
2022	UConn	UConn	UConn	Prasco Park (Mason, OH)
2023	UConn	Xavier	Xavier, UConn	Prasco Park (Mason, OH)
2024	UConn	St. John's	St. John's, UConn	Prasco Park (Mason, OH)
2025	Creighton and UConn	Creighton	Creighton	Prasco Park (Mason, OH)

=== Swimming and Diving ===
Big East men's swimming & diving is made up entirely of charter conference members, with UConn being a charter member of the 1979 incarnation, Xavier a charter member of the 2013 incarnation, and Georgetown, Providence, Seton Hall, and Villanova being charter members of both versions. However, UConn announced shortly before rejoining the Big East that it would cut men's swimming & diving along with men's cross country, men's tennis, and women's rowing effective in July 2021. Butler cut men's swimming & diving in 2007, when they also cut lacrosse. St. John's cut men's swimming & diving in 2003 due to Title IX, when they also cut women's swimming & diving, football, men's cross country, men's indoor track & field, and men's outdoor track & field and added men's lacrosse. The Big East Conference originally started sponsoring men's swimming & diving in 1979.

The Big East Conference Men's Swimming & Diving Championships have been held at some of the most prestigious pools in the United States. These pools include: Indiana University Natatorium, which has hosted multiple NCAA Division I Men's Swimming & Diving Championships and multiple United States Olympic Swimming Trials and United States Olympic Diving Trials; Nassau County Aquatic Center, which has hosted NCAA Division I Men's Swimming & Diving Championships and the International Goodwill Games; and University of Pittsburgh's Trees Pool, which hosted a total of 17 Big East Conference Men's Swimming & Diving Championships.

Out of the current members, Xavier has won a total of six Big East Conference Men's Swimming & Diving Championships, Georgetown has won five, while Seton Hall and Villanova have each won two.

Year	Tournament Champion	Tournament Runner-up	Tournament Venue
2014	Xavier (1)	Georgetown	Gloucester County Institute of Technology Aquatics Center (Sewell, NJ)
2015	Xavier (2)	Georgetown	Kelsey Partridge Bird Natatorium (Ithaca, NY)
2016	Xavier (3)	Georgetown	Nassau County Aquatics Center (East Meadow, NY)
2017	Seton Hall (1)	Georgetown	Nassau County Aquatics Center (East Meadow, NY)
2018	Seton Hall (2)	Villanova	SPIRE Academy Aquatics Center (Geneva, OH)
2019	Xavier (4)	Georgetown	Nassau County Aquatics Center (East Meadow, NY)
2020	Xavier (5)	Georgetown	Nassau County Aquatics Center (East Meadow, NY)
2021	Xavier (6)	Villanova	SPIRE Academy Aquatics Center (Geneva, OH)
2022	Georgetown (1)	Xavier	Nassau County Aquatics Center (East Meadow, NY)
2023	Georgetown (2)	Xavier	Nassau County Aquatics Center (East Meadow, NY)
2024	Georgetown (3)	Xavier	Indiana University Natatorium (Indianapolis, IN)
2025	Georgetown (4)	Seton Hall	SPIRE Academy Aquatics Center (Geneva, OH)
2026	Georgetown (5)	Seton Hall	Florida Aquatics Swimming & Training (FAST) (Ocala, FL)

=== Cross Country ===
Villanova men's cross country team won three straight NCAA National Championships in 1966, 1967 and 1968, as well as a fourth in 1970. They also finished 2nd in 1962 and 1969. Providence men's cross country team have also finished in second in 1981 and 1982.

Year	Big East Champion	NCAA Championship Team Entries
2013	Villanova	Providence, Villanova
2014	Villanova	Georgetown, Providence, Villanova
2015	Georgetown	Georgetown
2016	Georgetown	Georgetown, Providence
2017	Georgetown	None
2018	Georgetown	Villanova
2019	Villanova	None
2021 (spring)	Butler	None
2021 (fall)	Butler	Butler, Villanova
2022	Butler	Butler, Georgetown
2023	Butler	Butler, Georgetown, Villanova
2024	Villanova	

==== NCAA National Championships ====
School	NCAA Champion	Years	NCAA Runner-up	Years
Villanova	4	1966, 1967, 1968, 1970	2	1962, 1969
Providence	0	N/A	2	1981, 1982

=== Tennis ===
Year	Champion	Series	Runner up	Tournament Venue
2014	St. John's (1)	4–1	DePaul (3)	USTA National Tennis Center (Fresh Meadows, NY)
2015	St. John's (1)	4–2	Marquette (2)	Barbara S. Wynne Tennis Center (Indianapolis, IN)
2016	St. John's (1)	4–0	Marquette (2)	Cayce Tennis and Fitness Center (Cayce, SC)
2017	Butler (3)	4–3	Marquette (5)	Cayce Tennis and Fitness Center (Cayce, SC)
2018	Marquette (3)	4–1	DePaul (1)	Cayce Tennis and Fitness Center (Cayce, SC)
2019	St. John's (1)	4–3	Marquette (3)	Cayce Tennis and Fitness Center (Cayce, SC)
2020	Canceled due to the COVID-19 pandemic			Cayce Tennis and Fitness Center (Cayce, SC)
2021	DePaul (1)	4–3	St. John's (2)	Cayce Tennis and Fitness Center (Cayce, SC)
2022	DePaul (2)	4–2	St. John's (1)	Cayce Tennis and Fitness Center (Cayce, SC)
2023	St. John's (2)	4–0	Butler (4)	Cayce Tennis and Fitness Center (Cayce, SC)
2024	DePaul (2)	4–2	St. John's (1)	Cayce Tennis and Fitness Center (Cayce, SC)
2025	St. John's (1)	4–0	Creighton (2)	Cayce Tennis and Fitness Center (Cayce, SC)
2026	St. John's (1)	4–1	DePaul (2)	Cayce Tennis and Fitness Center (Cayce, SC)

== Women's sports ==
Women's sponsored sports by school
School	Basketball	Cross Country	Field Hockey	Golf	Lacrosse	Soccer	Softball	Swimming & Diving	Tennis	Track & Field (Indoor)	Track & Field (Outdoor)	Volleyball	Total Big East Sports
Butler	Yes	Yes	No	Yes	Yes	Yes	Yes	Yes	Yes	Yes	Yes	Yes	11
Creighton	Yes	Yes	No	Yes	No	Yes	Yes	No	Yes	No	No	Yes	7
DePaul	Yes	Yes	No	No	No	Yes	Yes	No	Yes	Yes	Yes	Yes	8
Georgetown	Yes	Yes	Yes	Yes	Yes	Yes	Yes	Yes	Yes	Yes	Yes	Yes	12
Marquette	Yes	Yes	No	No	Yes	Yes	No	Yes	Yes	Yes	Yes	Yes	9
Providence	Yes	Yes	Yes	Yes	No	Yes	Yes	Yes	Yes	Yes	Yes	Yes	11
St. John's	Yes	Yes	No	Yes	No	Yes	Yes	No	Yes	Yes	Yes	Yes	9
Seton Hall	Yes	Yes	No	Yes	No	Yes	Yes	Yes	Yes	No	No	Yes	8
UConn	Yes	Yes	Yes	No	Yes	Yes	Yes	Yes	Yes	Yes	Yes	Yes	11
Villanova	Yes	Yes	Yes	No	Yes	Yes	Yes	Yes	Yes	Yes	Yes	Yes	11
Xavier	Yes	Yes	No	Yes	Yes	Yes	No	Yes	Yes	Yes	Yes	Yes	10
Totals	11	11	4+3 (Note: Associates Liberty, Old Dominion, and Temple.)	7	6+1 (Note: Associate member Denver.)	11	9	8	11	9	9	11	107+4

Women's varsity sports not sponsored by the Big East Conference which are played by Big East schools
School	Fencing	Ice Hockey	Rowing	Sailing (Note: Sailing is not an NCAA-sanctioned sport, instead being governed by the Inter-Collegiate Sailing Association.)	Water polo
Creighton	No	No	WCC	No	No
Georgetown	No	No	EAWRC & Patriot	MAISA	No
Providence	No	Hockey East	No	No	No
St. John's	Independent	No	No	No	No
UConn	No	Hockey East	CAA (Note: UConn has reinstated its women's rowing program through July 2023 and plans to assess costs associated with a program upgrade and potential long-term reinstatement.)	No	No
Villanova	No	No	CAA	No	Metro

=== Basketball ===
Year	Regular season champion	Player of the Year	Tournament Champion	Tournament MVP	NCAA Tournament Bids
2013–14	DePaul	Marissa Janning (Creighton)	DePaul	Jasmine Penny (DePaul)	DePaul
2014–15	DePaul, Seton Hall	Brittany Hrynko (DePaul)	DePaul	Megan Podkowa (DePaul)	DePaul, Seton Hall
2015–16	DePaul	Chanise Jenkins (DePaul)	St. John's	Aliyyah Handford (St. John's)	DePaul, St. John's, Seton Hall
2016–17	Creighton, DePaul	Brooke Schulte (DePaul)	Marquette	Amani Wilborn (Marquette)	Creighton, DePaul, Marquette
2017–18	DePaul, Marquette	Allazia Blockton (Marquette)	DePaul	Amarah Coleman (DePaul)	DePaul (#5 Spokane), Marquette (#8 Lexington), Villanova (#9 Spokane), Creighton (#11 Kansas City)
2018–19	Marquette	Natisha Hiedeman (Marquette)	DePaul	Chante Stonewall (DePaul)	Marquette (#5 Chicago), DePaul (#6 Chicago)
2019–20	DePaul	Jaylyn Agnew (Creighton)	DePaul	Lexi Held (DePaul)	NCAA Tournament canceled due to the COVID-19 pandemic
2020–21	UConn	Paige Bueckers (UConn)	UConn	Paige Bueckers (UConn)	UConn (#1 River Walk), Marquette (#10 River Walk)
2021–22	UConn	Maddy Siegrist (Villanova)	UConn	Christyn Williams (UConn)	UConn (#2 Bridgeport), Creighton (#10 Greensboro), Villanova (#11 Wichita), DePaul (#11, First Four)
2022–23	UConn	Maddy Siegrist (Villanova)	UConn	Aaliyah Edwards (UConn)	UConn (#2 Seattle 3), Villanova (#4 Greenville 2), Creighton (#6 Greenville 1), Marquette (#9 Greenville 1), St. John's (#11 Seattle 3, First Four)
2023–24	UConn	Paige Bueckers (UConn)	UConn	Paige Bueckers (UConn)	UConn (#3 Portland 3), Creighton (#7 Albany 2), Marquette (#10 Albany 1)
2024–25	UConn	Paige Bueckers (UConn)	UConn	Paige Bueckers (UConn)	UConn (#2 Spokane 4), Creighton (#9 Birmingham 3)

=== Field Hockey ===
The Big East began sponsoring field hockey in 1989, but conference records only indicate that a postseason tournament was held; the first recorded season of full league play was 1993, with Boston College, UConn, Georgetown, Providence, Syracuse, and Villanova participating. Georgetown left Big East field hockey after the 1994 season, and was replaced by incoming Big East member Rutgers. The next change in field hockey membership came in 2005, when BC left for the ACC and was replaced by Louisville. Georgetown returned its field hockey program to the Big East the next year, after which the conference's field hockey membership remained unchanged until the 2013 conference split. Shortly before the split, Old Dominion was set to join the original Big East as a field hockey associate.

The conference split left both successor leagues—the reconfigured Big East and The American—with too few field hockey members to qualify for an automatic NCAA tournament berth. As a result, both leagues agreed that only the "new" Big East would sponsor the sport, and that all American members with field hockey programs would become associates. Accordingly, the Big East field hockey conference would now be made up of Big East full members Georgetown, Providence, and Villanova; American members UConn, Louisville, Rutgers, and Temple; and Old Dominion, otherwise a member of Conference USA. Following the 2014 departure of Louisville and Rutgers for all-sports membership in conferences that sponsored field hockey (respectively the ACC and Big Ten), Big East field hockey operated with six members until Liberty and Quinnipiac joined as associate members in 2016.

Year	Regular season champion	Tournament Champion	NCAA Tournament Bids
2013	UConn	UConn	UConn, Old Dominion
2014	UConn	UConn	UConn
2015	UConn	UConn	UConn
2016	UConn	UConn	UConn
2017	UConn	UConn	UConn
2018	UConn	UConn	UConn
2019	UConn	UConn	UConn
2021 (spring)	UConn	UConn	UConn
2021 (fall)	Liberty	Liberty	Liberty
2022	Liberty	Liberty	Liberty
2023	Liberty	Old Dominion	Liberty, Old Dominion
2024	UConn	UConn	UConn

==== NCAA National Championships ====
The only honors listed here are those earned by Big East field hockey members while playing the sport in the conference. In addition to these:

- UConn had two national titles and two runner-up finishes as a member of the original Big East, but before the conference established a field hockey league.
- Old Dominion had nine national titles and three runner-up finishes before joining Big East field hockey.

School	NCAA Champion	Years	NCAA Runner-up	Years
UConn	3	2013, 2014, 2017	0	N/A
Liberty	0	N/A	1	2021

=== Soccer ===
Year	Regular season champion	Tournament Champion	NCAA Tournament Bids
2013	Marquette	Marquette	DePaul, Georgetown, Marquette, St. John's
2014	DePaul	DePaul	DePaul, Georgetown
2015	St. John's	Butler	Butler, Georgetown, St. John's
2016	Marquette, DePaul	Georgetown	Georgetown, Marquette
2017	Georgetown	Georgetown	Butler, Georgetown
2018	Georgetown	Georgetown	Georgetown
2019	Xavier	Xavier	Georgetown, Xavier
2021 (spring)	Georgetown (East & overall); Butler (Midwest)	Georgetown	Georgetown
2021 (fall)	Xavier	Georgetown	Georgetown, St. John's, Xavier, Butler
2022	Georgetown	Georgetown	Georgetown, Xavier
2023	Georgetown, Xavier	Georgetown	Georgetown, Providence, Xavier
2024	Georgetown	UConn	Georgetown, UConn

=== Softball ===
Nine Big East members sponsor softball, with Marquette and Xavier as the exceptions. The original Big East first sponsored the sport in the 1990 season.

Year	Regular season champion	Tournament Champion	NCAA Tournament Bids
2014	DePaul	DePaul	DePaul
2015	St. John's	St. John's	St. John's
2016	DePaul	Butler	Butler
2017	St. John's	DePaul	DePaul
2018	DePaul	DePaul	DePaul
2019	St. John's	DePaul	DePaul
2020	Season canceled due to the COVID-19 pandemic		
2021	DePaul	Villanova	Villanova
2022	UConn	Villanova	Villanova
2023	UConn	Seton Hall	Seton Hall
2024	Villanova	Villanova	Creighton
2025	St. John's	UConn	UConn

=== Swimming and diving ===
Big East women's swimming & diving is made up of charter members Butler, Georgetown, Marquette, Providence, Seton Hall, UConn, Villanova and Xavier (UConn was a charter member of the original Big East, but not of its 2013 version). St. John's cut women's swimming & diving in 2003 due to Title IX, when they also cut men's swimming & diving, football, men's cross country, men's indoor track & field, and men's outdoor track & field and added men's lacrosse. It was announced on May 8, 2025 that Marquette would be adding the sport of women's swimming & diving, beginning in the 2026–27 season. The Big East Conference originally started sponsoring women's swimming & diving in 1981–82, the same season in which the NCAA began sponsoring women's sports.

The Big East Conference Women's Swimming & Diving Championships have been held at some of the most prestigious pools in the United States. These pools include: Indiana University Natatorium, which has hosted multiple NCAA Division I Women's Swimming & Diving Championships and multiple United States Olympic Swimming Trials and United States Olympic Diving Trials; Nassau County Aquatic Center, which has hosted NCAA Division I Women's Swimming & Diving Championships and the International Goodwill Games; and University of Pittsburgh's Trees Pool, which hosted a total of 17 Big East Conference Women's Swimming & Diving Championships.

Out of the current members, Villanova has won a total of 18 Big East Conference Women's Swimming & Diving Championships. This includes a current streak of 13 in a row, which is the second longest active NCAA conference championship win streak.

Year	Tournament Champion	Tournament Runner-up	Tournament Venue
2014	Villanova (6)	Georgetown	Gloucester County Institute of Technology Aquatics Center (Sewell, NJ)
2015	Villanova (7)	Georgetown	Kelsey Partridge Bird Natatorium (Ithaca, NY)
2016	Villanova (8)	Georgetown	Nassau County Aquatics Center (East Meadow, NY)
2017	Villanova (9)	Georgetown	Nassau County Aquatics Center (East Meadow, NY)
2018	Villanova (10)	Georgetown	SPIRE Academy Aquatics Center (Geneva, OH)
2019	Villanova (11)	Xavier	Nassau County Aquatics Center (East Meadow, NY)
2020	Villanova (12)	Georgetown	Nassau County Aquatics Center (East Meadow, NY)
2021	Villanova (13)	UConn	SPIRE Academy Aquatics Center (Geneva, OH)
2022	Villanova (14)	UConn	Nassau County Aquatics Center (East Meadow, NY)
2023	Villanova (15)	UConn	Nassau County Aquatics Center (East Meadow, NY)
2024	Villanova (16)	UConn	Indiana University Natatorium (Indianapolis, IN)
2025	Villanova (17)	UConn	SPIRE Academy Aquatics Center (Geneva, OH)
2026	Villanova (18)	UConn	Florida Aquatics Swimming & Training (FAST) (Ocala, FL)

=== Volleyball ===
All full members of the Big East sponsor women's volleyball. However, during the first season of the reconfigured Big East in 2013, Providence was an affiliate member of the America East Conference. The Friars joined Big East volleyball in 2014 after completing their contractual obligation to the America East.

Year	Regular season	Tournament	Runner-up	NCAA Bids
2013	Marquette	Marquette	Creighton	Creighton, Marquette
2014	Creighton	Creighton	Seton Hall	Creighton, Marquette, Seton Hall
2015	Creighton	Creighton	Villanova	Creighton, Marquette, Villanova
2016	Creighton	Creighton	Xavier	Creighton, Marquette
2017	Creighton	Creighton	Marquette	Creighton, Marquette
2018	Creighton	Creighton	Marquette	Creighton, Marquette
2019	Creighton	St. John's	Marquette	Creighton, Marquette, St. John's
2021 (spring)	Creighton (Midwest & overall); St. John's (East)	Creighton	Marquette	Creighton
2021 (fall)	Creighton, Marquette	Creighton	Marquette	Creighton, Marquette
2022	Creighton, Marquette	Creighton	Marquette	Creighton, Marquette
2023	Creighton, Marquette	Creighton	St. John's	Creighton, Marquette
2024	Creighton	Creighton	Marquette	Creighton, Marquette

=== Cross Country ===
The Providence women's cross country team have been crowned NCAA National Champions in 1995 and 2013, as well as finishing 2nd in 1990 and 2012. The Villanova women's cross country team won two straight NCAA National Championships in 2009 and 2010 and six straight NCAA National Championships in 1989, 1990, 1991, 1992, 1993, and 1994. Villanova runners also won an individual NCAA National Championship in 1998, as well as placing 3rd in 1995, 2nd in 1996 and 3rd in 2011. The Georgetown women's cross country team were NCAA National Champions in 2011.

Year	Big East Champion	NCAA Championship Team Entries
2013	Providence	Butler, Georgetown, Providence, Villanova
2014	Georgetown	Georgetown, Providence
2015	Providence	Georgetown, Providence, Villanova
2016	Providence	Providence, Villanova
2017	Villanova	Providence, Villanova
2018	Villanova	None
2019	Butler	None
2021 (spring)	Georgetown	None
2021 (fall)	Georgetown	Butler, Georgetown, Providence, Villanova
2022	Georgetown	Butler, Georgetown, Providence, Villanova
2023	Georgetown	Georgetown, Providence
2024	Georgetown	

==== NCAA National Championships ====
School	NCAA Champion	Years	NCAA Runner-up	Years
Villanova	9	1989, 1990, 1991, 1992, 1993, 1994, 1998, 2009, 2010	1	1996
Providence	2	1995, 2013	2	1990, 2012
Georgetown	1	2011	0	N/A

=== Lacrosse ===
The Big East began sponsoring women's lacrosse in the 2001 season with Boston College, UConn, Georgetown, Notre Dame, Rutgers, Syracuse, and Virginia Tech. The original lineup stayed in place until Virginia Tech and BC left for the ACC, respectively in 2004 and 2005. The conference replaced BC with Loyola (Maryland) for the 2006 season, and the Greyhounds remained an associate member until the school joined the Patriot League, which already sponsored women's lacrosse, in 2013. Originally, the conference championship was decided solely by league play; a postseason tournament was added starting in the 2007 season with the top four teams qualifying, a format that exists to this day. The next changes in women's lacrosse membership came in the 2009 season, when Cincinnati and Louisville (both of which had only added varsity lacrosse for the 2008 season) brought their teams into the Big East. Villanova followed in the 2010 season.

As in the case of field hockey, the 2013 conference split left the Big East and The American with too few lacrosse teams for an automatic NCAA bid. Also in a parallel with field hockey, the two conferences agreed that only the reconfigured Big East would sponsor the sport, with all women's lacrosse teams from The American becoming associate members. The first season of women's lacrosse in the reconfigured league in 2014 would thus include Cincinnati, UConn, Georgetown, Louisville, new varsity team Marquette, Rutgers, Temple, and Villanova. The Big East would lose Louisville and Rutgers after that season, respectively to the ACC and Big Ten, replacing them with Florida and Vanderbilt (the only two SEC schools sponsoring the sport) after the demise of the American Lacrosse Conference.

For the 2017 season, Butler added varsity women's lacrosse and Denver brought its women's lacrosse team into the league, giving the Big East 10 members in the sport. However, after the 2018 season, the Big East lost all of its women's lacrosse associate members except Denver to the new women's lacrosse conference of The American. The Big East retained its automatic NCAA tournament bid for the 2019 season and beyond by adding Old Dominion, already an associate member in field hockey.

On April 16, 2020, Old Dominion announced its women's lacrosse would join the American Athletic Conference in the 2021 season (2020–21 school year), essentially swapping places with incoming full member UConn. Both conferences thus maintained the six members required for an automatic bid to the NCAA tournament.

Xavier added women's lacrosse in the 2023 season, playing as an independent for its first season before starting full Big East play in 2024.

Year	Regular season	Tournament	Runner-up	NCAA Bids
2014	Louisville	Louisville	Georgetown	Louisville, Georgetown (both Second Round)
2015	Florida, Georgetown	Florida	UConn	Florida (second round)
2016	Florida	Florida	Temple	Florida (second round)
2017	Florida	Florida	Denver	Florida (second round)
2018	Florida	Florida	Denver	Florida (quarter-finals), Denver (second round), Georgetown (first round)
2019	Denver	Georgetown	Denver	Georgetown (second round), Denver (quarterfinals)
2020	Season canceled due to the COVID-19 pandemic			
2021	Denver	Denver	UConn	UConn (first round), Denver (second round)
2022	Denver	Denver	Georgetown	UConn (first round), Denver (second round)
2023	Denver	Denver	UConn	Denver (semifinals), Marquette (first round), UConn (first round)
2024	Denver	Denver	UConn	Denver (second round)
2025	Denver	Denver	UConn	Denver (first round)

== NCAA team championships ==
This list includes NCAA championships won by members of the Big East. Excluded from this list are all national championships earned outside the scope of NCAA competition, including ICSA sailing championships (14 by Georgetown), women's AIAW championships (2 by Old Dominion), equestrian titles (0), and retroactive Helms Athletic Foundation titles (1 by St. John's). Associate members, indicated in italics, are listed with NCAA championships won in their Big East sports while competing in the conference.

School	Nickname	Total	Men	Women	Co-ed
UConn	Huskies	24	8	16	0
Villanova	Wildcats	21	11	9	0
Georgetown	Hoyas	3	2	1	0
Providence	Friars	3	1	2	0
St. John's	Red Storm	2	1	0	1
Denver	Pioneers	1	1	0	0
Marquette	Golden Eagles	1	1	0	0
Butler	Bulldogs	0	0	0	0
Creighton	Bluejays	0	0	0	0
DePaul	Blue Demons	0	0	0	0
Seton Hall	Pirates	0	0	0	0
Xavier	Musketeers	0	0	0	0

== Facilities ==
School	Basketball arena(s)	Capacity	Soccer stadium	Capacity	Baseball park	Capacity	Softball park	Capacity	Lacrosse stadium	Capacity
Butler	Hinkle Fieldhouse	9,100	Sellick Bowl	7,500 (Note: Approximate total capacity including grass seating; seated capacity is 5,647.)	Bulldog Park	500	Butler Softball Field	500	Varsity Field	—N/a
Creighton	M: CHI Health Center Omaha; W: D. J. Sokol Arena	18,320; 2,950	Morrison Stadium	6,000	TD Ameritrade Park Omaha	24,505	Creighton Sports Complex	1,000	Non-lacrosse school	
DePaul	M&W: Wintrust Arena at McCormick Square; W: McGrath-Phillips Arena	10,387; 3,000	Wish Field	1,000	Non-baseball school		Cacciatore Stadium	1,000	Non-lacrosse school	
Georgetown	M: Capital One Arena; W: McDonough Gymnasium	20,035; 2,500	Shaw Field	1,625	Capital One Park	650	Nats Academy	200	Cooper Field	3,750
Marquette	M: Fiserv Forum; W: Al McGuire Center	18,850; 4,000	Valley Fields	1,600	Non-baseball school		Non-softball school		Time Warner Cable Stadium; Hart Park Stadium; Valley Fields	7,000; 5,500; 1600
Providence	M: Amica Mutual Pavilion; W: Alumni Hall	12,400; 1,854	Chapey Field at Anderson Stadium	3,000	Non-baseball school		Glay Field	500	Chapey Field at Anderson Stadium	3,000
Seton Hall	M: Prudential Center; W: Walsh Gymnasium	18,711; 1,316	Owen T. Carroll Field	261	Owen T. Carroll Field	261	Essex County; Mike Shepard, Sr. Field	300	Non-lacrosse school	
St. John's	M: Madison Square Garden; M&W: Carnesecca Arena (Note: St. John's men generally play their Big East home schedule in Madison Square Garden and their non-conference home schedule on campus at Carnesecca Arena.)	19,979; 5,602	Belson Stadium	2,168	Jack Kaiser Stadium	3,500	Red Storm Field	250	DaSilva Memorial Field	1,200
UConn	Harry A. Gampel Pavilion; PeoplesBank Arena	10,299; 15,564	Joseph J. Morrone Stadium	5,100	Elliot Ballpark	1,500	Connecticut Softball Stadium	518	George J. Sherman Family-Sports Complex	2,000
Villanova	M&W: Xfinity Mobile Arena; M&W: William B. Finneran Pavilion (Note: For certain high-profile home games, Villanova uses the Xfinity Mobile Arena, and previously used the Spectrum. In 2005-06, Villanova played three home games at the Xfinity Mobile Arena and the rest on campus at The Pavilion. In 2006, the Xfinity Mobile Arena was also a first-round site for the NCAA tournament. Under NCAA rules, a venue is not considered a home court unless a school plays four or more regular-season games there; this enabled Villanova to play its first two tournament games at the Xfinity Mobile Arena (but Villanova was not considered the host school for that sub-region - the Atlantic 10 Conference was). This situation occurred again in 2009, with Villanova playing (and winning) its first two tournament games at Xfinity Mobile Arena.)	20,328; 6,500	Higgins Soccer Complex	1,500	Villanova Ballpark at Plymouth	300	Villanova Softball Complex	250	Villanova Stadium	12,500
Xavier	Cintas Center	10,250	Corcoran Field	1,000	J. Page Hayden Field	500	Non-softball school		Non-lacrosse school	

== See also ==
- Big East Conference (1979–2013)
- American Conference (NCAA)
- List of NCAA conferences
