= Xavier Musketeers men's soccer =

American college soccer team

- Founded: 1974; 52 years ago
- University: Xavier University
- Head coach: John Higgins (2025 season)
- Conference: Big East
- Location: Norwood, Ohio, US
- Stadium: Corcoran Field (capacity: 1,600)
- Nickname: Musketeers, The X
- Colors: Navy blue, white, and gray
| Home | Away |

NCAA tournament Round of 16
- 2014

NCAA tournament appearances
- 2010, 2011, 2012, 2014, 2023

Conference tournament championships
- 2010, 2011, 2023

The Xavier Musketeers men's soccer team is an intercollegiate varsity sports team of Xavier University. The team is a member of the Big East Conference of the National Collegiate Athletic Association.

== History ==
Xavier University is a Jesuit university established in Cincinnati, Ohio in 1831. In March 1974, it was announced that a varsity soccer program would be formed at Xavier, and tryouts were held. Coached by Bob McKinney, the team played their first ever regular season match on September 21, 1974, at Corcoran Field, defeating the visiting Thomas More Rebels 3–2. They finished their inaugural fall season with a 5–7–0 record.

In 1975, the team brought in its first ever class of recruits, with McKinney scouting several players from nearby high school teams. They finished the 1975 season with an 8–5–0 record. However, after finishing 1976 with a 3–4–3 record, Bob McKinney resigned as head coach.

In March 1977, Xavier hired John Capurro as their new head coach. John Capurro had previously assisted his brother, Nick Capurro, in coaching the Cincinnati Comets, a short-lived professional team which had folded in 1975.

Vince Pecoraro took Capurro's place as head coach ahead of the 1986 season.

Until 1987, the Xavier men's soccer team had not been a part of any athletic conference. Xavier University had been a founding member of the Midwestern Collegiate Conference (MCC) since 1979, but the conference did not originally sponsor men's soccer. Xavier was one of six universities to play in the MCC's inaugural men's soccer season in 1987.

In 1991, Jack Hermans replaced Pecoraro as Xavier's new head coach.

In 1995, Xavier left the MCC and joined the Atlantic 10 Conference.

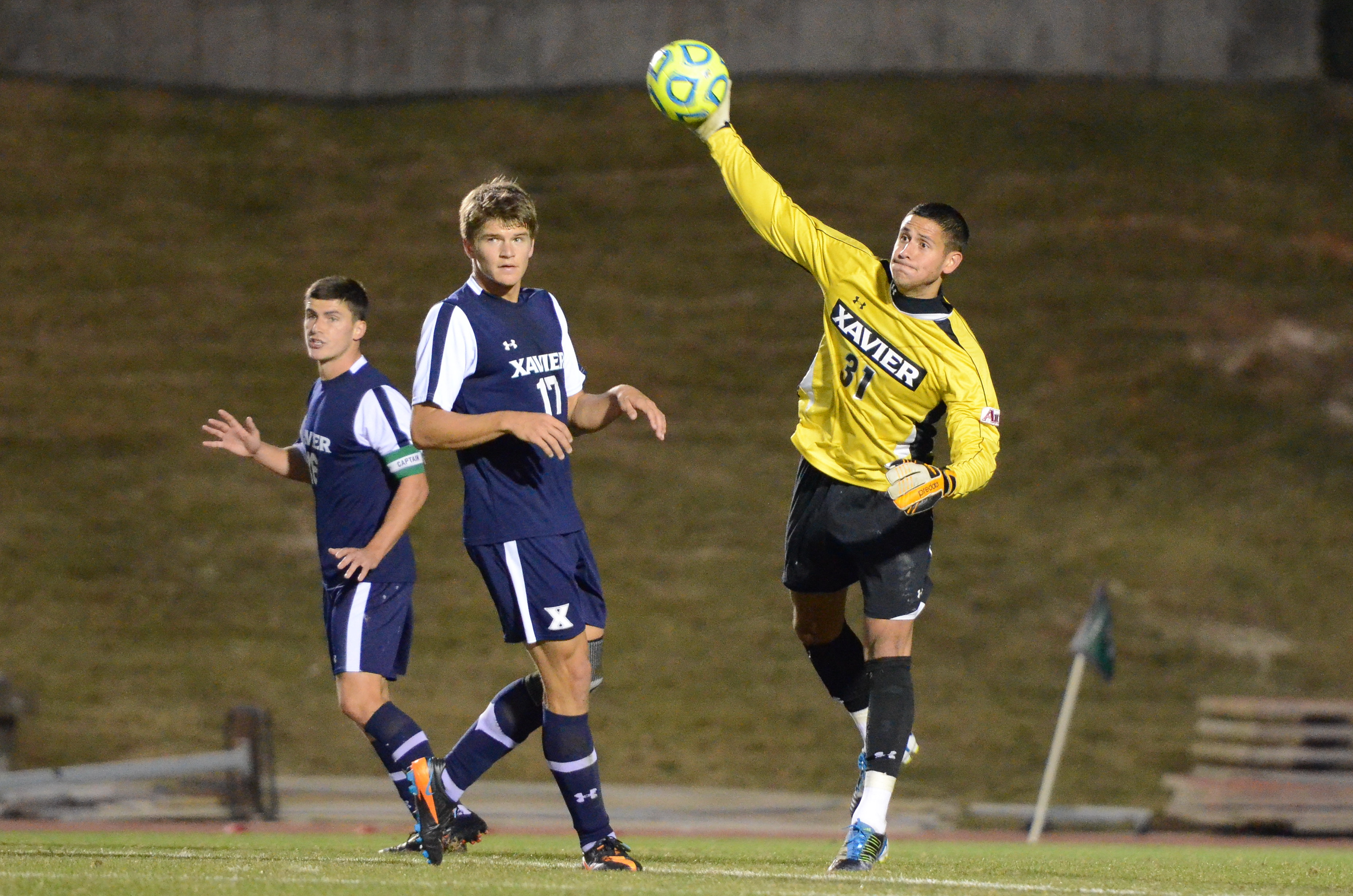
Justin Marshall, Nick Hagglund, and James Queree representing Xavier in the 2012 Atlantic 10 Tournament semifinals

In 2005, Dave Schureck replaced Hermans as Xavier's head coach.

In 2010, Andy Fleming replaced Schureck as head coach. That year, Xavier finished with a 10–6–4 record and went on to win the Atlantic 10 Championship playoffs. This earned them an automatic bid in the 2010 NCAA Division I Men's Soccer Tournament, the first NCAA tournament appearance in the team's history. They lost to West Virginia with a score of 4–2 in the first round.

In 2013, Xavier left the Atlantic 10 to join the Big East Conference.

John Higgins followed Andy Fleming as the head coach of the Musketeers in March 2022. Shaun Mahoney and Ian Vickers joined Coach Higgins as associate head coach and assistant coach, respectively, in May 2022.

=== Coaching staff ===
| Position | Name |
|---|---|
| Head coach | John Higgins |
| Associate head coach | Shaun Mahoney |
| Assistant coach | Ian Vicars |
| Director of operations | Noel Orozco |
| Director of goalkeeping | Alex Kamphaus |

== Record by year ==
As of June 13, 2025

| Year | Coach | Conference | W | L | D |
|---|---|---|---|---|---|
| 1974 | Bob McKinney | None | 5 | 7 | 0 |
| 1975 | Bob McKinney | None | 8 | 5 | 0 |
| 1976 | Bob McKinney | None | 3 | 4 | 3 |
| 1977 | John Capurro | None | 4 | 8 | 1 |
| 1978 | John Capurro | None | 7 | 7 | 3 |
| 1979 | John Capurro | None | 11 | 4 | 0 |
| 1980 | John Capurro | None | 9 | 6 | 5 |
| 1981 | John Capurro | None | 5 | 9 | 2 |
| 1982 | John Capurro | None | 8 | 8 | 2 |
| 1983 | John Capurro | None | 7 | 5 | 2 |
| 1984 | John Capurro | None | 4 | 8 | 2 |
| 1985 | John Capurro | None | 4 | 9 | 0 |
| 1986 | Vince Pecoraro | None | 8 | 7 | 2 |
| 1987 | Vince Pecoraro | Midwestern Collegiate | 8 | 12 | 2 |
| 1988 | Vince Pecoraro | Midwestern Collegiate | 11 | 6 | 2 |
| 1989 | Vince Pecoraro | Midwestern Collegiate | 6 | 13 | 4 |
| 1990 | Vince Pecoraro | Midwestern Collegiate | 5 | 15 | 1 |
| 1991 | Jack Hermans | Midwestern Collegiate | 6 | 11 | 4 |
| 1992 | Jack Hermans | Midwestern Collegiate | 8 | 8 | 4 |
| 1993 | Jack Hermans | Midwestern Collegiate | 5 | 14 | 1 |
| 1994 | Jack Hermans | Midwestern Collegiate | 12 | 8 | 0 |
| 1995 | Jack Hermans | Atlantic 10 | 8 | 10 | 2 |
| 1996 | Jack Hermans | Atlantic 10 | 7 | 11 | 0 |
| 1997 | Jack Hermans | Atlantic 10 | 10 | 10 | 1 |
| 1998 | Jack Hermans | Atlantic 10 | 11 | 9 | 0 |
| 1999 | Jack Hermans | Atlantic 10 | 5 | 13 | 1 |
| 2000 | Jack Hermans | Atlantic 10 | 4 | 14 | 0 |
| 2001 | Jack Hermans | Atlantic 10 | 7 | 11 | 1 |
| 2002 | Jack Hermans | Atlantic 10 | 10 | 7 | 2 |
| 2003 | Jack Hermans | Atlantic 10 | 4 | 16 | 0 |
| 2004 | Jack Hermans | Atlantic 10 | 5 | 12 | 2 |
| 2005 | Dave Schureck | Atlantic 10 | 4 | 10 | 5 |
| 2006 | Dave Schureck | Atlantic 10 | 7 | 10 | 2 |
| 2007 | Dave Schureck | Atlantic 10 | 8 | 10 | 1 |
| 2008 | Dave Schureck | Atlantic 10 | 3 | 12 | 4 |
| 2009 | Dave Schureck | Atlantic 10 | 2 | 13 | 1 |
| 2010 | Andy Fleming | Atlantic 10 | 10 | 7 | 4 |
| 2011 | Andy Fleming | Atlantic 10 | 12 | 5 | 4 |
| 2012 | Andy Fleming | Atlantic 10 | 14 | 3 | 5 |
| 2013 | Andy Fleming | Big East | 10 | 7 | 2 |
| 2014 | Andy Fleming | Big East | 15 | 6 | 2 |
| 2015 | Andy Fleming | Big East | 12 | 6 | 1 |
| 2016 | Andy Fleming | Big East | 8 | 8 | 3 |
| 2017 | Andy Fleming | Big East | 11 | 6 | 3 |
| 2018 | Andy Fleming | Big East | 6 | 7 | 6 |
| 2019 | Andy Fleming | Big East | 8 | 8 | 1 |
| 2020 | Andy Fleming | Big East | 3 | 7 | 1 |
| 2021 | Andy Fleming | Big East | 9 | 7 | 1 |
| 2022 | Andy Fleming | Big East | 9 | 2 | 7 |
| 2023 | Andy Fleming | Big East | 9 | 4 | 6 |
| 2024 | Andy Fleming | Big East | 4 | 8 | 5 |

== Notable alumni ==
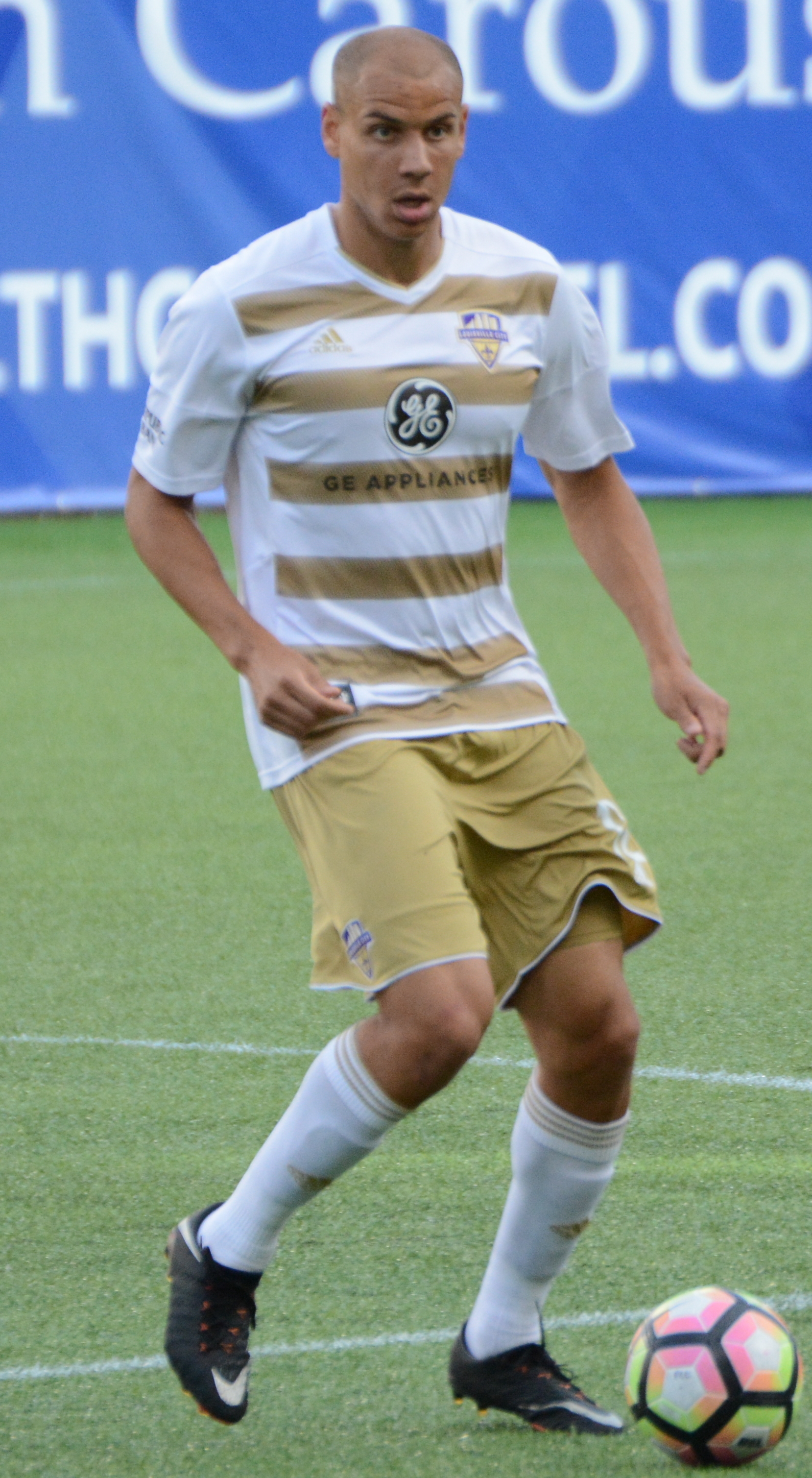
Luke Spencer was the first Xavier player to be drafted; he was picked 23rd in the 2013 MLS SuperDraft by the New England Revolution.

| Name | Position | Years at Xavier |
|---|---|---|
| Craig Blazer | GK | 1987–1991 |
| Cory Brown | DF | 2014–2017 |
| Jalen Brown | FW/MF | 2013–2016 |
| Nick Hagglund | DF | 2010–2013 |
| Garrett Halfhill | DF | 2011–2014 |
| Dallas Jaye | GK | 2015 |
| Cole Jensen | GK | 2018–2022 |
| Chris Korb | DF | 2006 |
| Matt Nance | DF | 2014–2018 |
| Eric Osswald | GK | 2013–2014 |
| Todd Pratzner | DF | 2013–2016 |
| Sammy Sergi | FW | 2015–2019 |
| Luke Spencer | FW | 2009–2012 |
| Matt Walker | MF | 2010–2013 |

== See also ==
- Xavier Musketeers
