= 2019 NCAA Men's Soccer All-Americans =

An All-American team is an honorary sports team composed of the best amateur players of a specific season for each team position—who in turn are given the honorific "All-America" and typically referred to as "All-American athletes", or simply "All-Americans". Although the honorees generally do not compete together as a unit, the term is used in U.S. team sports to refer to players who are selected by members of the national media. Walter Camp selected the first All-America team in the early days of American football in 1889. The 2019 NCAA Men's Soccer All-Americans are honorary lists that include All-American selections from the United Soccer Coaches (USC), Top Drawer Soccer (TDS), Soccer America (TSN), and College Soccer News for the 2019 NCAA Division I men's soccer season. All selectors choose at least a first, second, and third 11-man team.

Although the aforementioned lists are used to determine consensus honors, there are numerous other All-American lists. The three finalists for the Hermann Trophy are described as Hermann All-Americans. The ten finalists for the Senior CLASS Award are described as Senior All-Americans. Other All-American lists include those determined by Hero Sports and many others. The scholar-athletes selected by College Sports Information Directors of America (CoSIDA) are termed Academic All-Americans.

== Individual All-America teams ==
=== By player ===
This list is of players who were named first-team All-Americans by each respective publication.

Key

CSN	College Soccer News
SA	Soccer America
TDS	Top Drawer Soccer
USC	United Soccer Coaches
*	Consensus All-American (selected by all selectors)
†	Awarded the Hermann Trophy as national Player of the Year

List

Position	Name	School	CSN	SA	TDS	USC	Notes
Goalkeeper	Trey Muse*	Indiana	✓	✓	✓	✓	Big Ten Goalkeeper of the Year
Defender	Tanner Beason*	Stanford	✓	✓	✓	✓	Pac-12 Player of the Year
Defender	Alex Comsia	North Carolina	✓	✓	—	✓	ACC Defender of the Year
Defender	Andrew Gutman^{†}*	Indiana	✓	✓	✓	✓	Hermann Trophy winner
Defender	Donovan Pines	Maryland	—	—	✓	—	
Midfielder	Giuseppe Barone*	Michigan State	✓	✓	✓	✓	Big Ten Midfielder of the Year
Midfielder	Tucker Bone*	Air Force	✓	✓	✓	✓	WAC Player of the Year
Midfielder	Siad Haji	VCU	—	—	✓	—	A-10 Midfielder of the Year
Midfielder	Callum Montgomery	Charlotte	—	✓	—	✓	CUSA Defender of the Year
Forward	Omir Fernandez	Wake Forest	✓	✓	—	✓	ACC Player of the Year
Forward	Bruno Lapa	Wake Forest	✓	✓	—	✓	ACC Midfielder of the Year
Forward	Cal Jennings*	UCF	✓	✓	✓	✓	American Player of the Year
Forward	Benji Michel	Portland	—	—	✓	—	
Forward	Tate Schmitt	Louisville	—	—	✓	—	
Forward	Andre Shinyashiki*	Denver	✓	✓	✓	✓	Senior CLASS Award winner
Forward	J. J. Williams*	Kentucky	✓	✓	✓	✓	CUSA Player of the Year

=== By team ===
All-America Team	First team		Second team		Third team	
All-America Team	Player	School	Player	School	Player	School
College Soccer News	Cal Jennings	UCF	Miguel Berry	San Diego	Daryl Dike	Virginia
College Soccer News	Robbie Robinson	Clemson	Anders Engebretsen	Saint Mary's (CA)	Kimarni Smith	Clemson
College Soccer News	Matthew Bentley	Missouri State	Garrett McLaughlin	SMU	Milo Yosef	Marshall
College Soccer News	Joe Bell	Virginia	Milan Iloski	UCLA	Thibaut Jacquel	Campbell
College Soccer News	Manuel Ferriol	James Madison	Jacob Montes	Georgetown	Aidan Megally	Loyola Chicago
College Soccer News	Bruno Lapa	Wake Forest	Aaron Molloy	Penn State	Lucas Rosa	Saint Francis (PA)
College Soccer News	Blake Bodily	Washington	Jesús Pérez	UIC	Gabriel Costa	SMU
College Soccer News	Dylan Nealis	Georgetown	Noah Billingsley	UC Santa Barbara	Ethan Bartlow	Washington
College Soccer News	Eddie Munjoma	SMU	Josh Bauer	New Hampshire	Peder Kristiansen	Rhode Island
College Soccer News	Malick Mbaye	Clemson	Henry Kessler	Virginia	Aime Mabika	Kentucky
College Soccer News	Tanner Beason	Stanford	Kyle Hiebert	Missouri State	Jack Maher	Indiana
College Soccer News	Colin Shutler	Virginia	Andrew Thomas	Stanford	Elliot Panicco	Charlotte
Soccer America	Colin Shutler	Virginia	Remi Prieur	Saint Mary's (CA)	Andrew Thomas	Stanford
Soccer America	Josh Bauer	New Hampshire	Ethan Bartlow	Washington	Noah Billingsley	UC Santa Barbara
Soccer America	Tanner Beason	Stanford	Kyle Hiebert	Missouri State	Peder Kristiansen	Rhode Island
Soccer America	Eddie Munjoma	SMU	Henry Kessler	Virginia	Malik Mbaye	Clemson
Soccer America	Dylan Nealis	Georgetown	Jack Maher	Indiana	Antonio Colacci	New Hampshire
Soccer America	Joe Bell	Virginia	Phillip Mayaka	Clemson	Gabriel Costa	SMU
Soccer America	Blake Bodily	Washington	Aaron Molloy	Penn State	Aidan Morris	Indiana
Soccer America	Bruno Lapa	Wake Forest	Jesus Perez	UIC	Jacob Montes	Georgetown
Soccer America	Matthew Bentley	Missouri State	Miguel Berry	San Diego	Daryl Dike	Virginia
Soccer America	Anders Engebretsen	Saint Mary's (CA)	Josh Dolling	Missouri State	Derek Dodson	Georgetown
Soccer America	Cal Jennings	UCF	Kimarni Smith	Clemson	Thibaut Jacquel	Campbell
Soccer America	Robbie Robinson	Clemson	Milo Yosef	Marshall	Josh Luchini	Lehigh
Top Drawer Soccer	Joe Bell	Virginia	Ethan Bartlow	Washington	Jack Maher	Indiana
Top Drawer Soccer	Dylan Nealis	Georgetown	Daryl Dike	Virginia	Milan Iloski	UCLA
Top Drawer Soccer	Robbie Robinson	Clemson	Rodney Michael	UC Santa Barbara	David Loera	NC State
Top Drawer Soccer	Cal Jennings	UCF	Yoni Sorokin	UCF	Anders Engebretsen	Saint Mary's (CA)
Top Drawer Soccer	Blake Bodily	Washington	Gabriel Costa	SMU	Sean Zawadzki	Georgetown
Top Drawer Soccer	Henry Kessler	Virginia	Colin Shutler	Virginia	Andrew Thomas	Stanford
Top Drawer Soccer	Aaron Molloy	Penn State	Matthew Bentley	Missouri State	Manuel Ferriol	James Madison
Top Drawer Soccer	Eddie Munjoma	SMU	Ryan Raposo	Syracuse	Noah Billingsley	UC Santa Barbara
Top Drawer Soccer	Miguel Berry	San Diego	Josh Bauer	New Hampshire	Tanner Beason	Stanford
Top Drawer Soccer	Bruno Lapa	Wake Forest	Yanis Leerman	UCF	Thibaut Jacquel	Campbell
Top Drawer Soccer	Jacob Montes	Georgetown	Remi Prieur	Saint Mary's (CA)	Jesus Perez	UIC
United Soccer Coaches	Colin Shutler	Virginia	Remi Prieur	Saint Mary's (CA)	Andrew Thomas	Stanford
United Soccer Coaches	Josh Bauer	New Hampshire	Ethan Bartlow	Washington	Noah Billingsley	UC Santa Barbara
United Soccer Coaches	Tanner Beason	Stanford	Kyle Hiebert	Missouri State	Peder Kristiansen	Rhode Island
United Soccer Coaches	Eddie Munjoma	SMU	Henry Kessler	Virginia	Malik Mbaye	Clemson
United Soccer Coaches	Dylan Nealis	Georgetown	Jack Maher	Indiana	Antonio Colacci	New Hampshire
United Soccer Coaches	Joe Bell	Virginia	Phillip Mayaka	Clemson	Gabriel Costa	SMU
United Soccer Coaches	Blake Bodily	Washington	Aaron Molloy	Penn State	Aidan Morris	Indiana
United Soccer Coaches	Bruno Lapa	Wake Forest	Jesus Perez	UIC	Jacob Montes	Georgetown
United Soccer Coaches	Matthew Bentley	Missouri State	Miguel Berry	San Diego	Daryl Dike	Virginia
United Soccer Coaches	Anders Engebretsen	Saint Mary's (CA)	Josh Dolling	Missouri State	Derek Dodson	Georgetown
United Soccer Coaches	Cal Jennings	UCF	Kimarni Smith	Clemson	Thibaut Jacquel	Campbell
United Soccer Coaches	Robbie Robinson	Clemson	Milo Yosef	Marshall	Josh Luchini	Lehigh

== Academic All-Americans ==
CoSIDA names three Academic All-American teams for the 2019 season.

First team		Second team		Third team	
Player	School	Player	School	Player	School
Michael Creek	Missouri State	Andrew Thomas	Stanford	Hagay Jalon	Florida Atlantic
Austin Day	Grand Canyon	Gideon Betz	Campbell	Kasey French	Washington
Kyle Hiebert	Missouri State	Christian Casagranda	Quinnipiac	David Grana	Saint Joseph's
Marius Kullmann	Loyola Chicago	Matt Di Rosa	Maryland	Connor Ramlo	Creighton
Dylan Waugaman	Valparaiso	Joel Harrison	Michigan	Ben Wendell	Cincinnati
Anthony Bowie	Western Michigan	Jacob Wilkinson	Radford	Jack Casey	Notre Dame
Nate Seaberg	Drake	Ruben Garcia	Liberty	Noah Leibold	Wisconsin
Jonas Westmeyer	Marshall	Rikard Lindqvist	Northern Kentucky	Zach Maas	Utah Valley
Jan Maertins	Northern Illinois	Pedro Valladao	IUPUI	Miguel Berry	San Diego
Tyrone Mondi	Coastal Carolina	Ryan DeBois	Western Illinois	Leandros Lillis	Temple
Daniele Proch	Duke	Cal Jennings	UCF	Johannes Pieles	Fordham
Daniele Proch	Duke	Samson Sergi	Xavier	Johannes Pieles	Fordham

== Senior All-Americans ==
The 10 finalists for the Senior CLASS Award are considered Senior All-Americans.

Player	Position	School
Tanner Beason	Defender	Stanford
Gideon Betz	Defender	Campbell
Drake Callender	Goalkeeper	California
Anders Engebretsen	Forward	Saint Mary's (CA)
Dayonn Harris	Forward	UConn
Cal Jennings	Forward	UCF
Garrett McLaughlin	Forward	SMU
Elliot Panicco	Goalkeeper	Charlotte
Mauricio Pineda	Midfielder	North Carolina
Jack Skahan	Midfielder	North Carolina

== Freshman All-Americans ==
All-America Team	First team		Second team		Third team	
All-America Team	Player	School	Player	School	Player	School
College Soccer News	Ousseni Bouda	Stanford	Liam Butts	Penn State	Calvin Harris	Wake Forest
College Soccer News	Walker Gillespie	Princeton	Rasmus Tobinski	Vermont	Sam Snaith	Coastal Carolina
College Soccer News	Milo Yosef	Marshall	Joshua Penn	Indiana	Stefan Sigurdarson	Boston College
College Soccer News	Kipp Keller	Saint Louis	Wilmer Cabrera Jr.	Butler	Papa Ndoye	LIU
College Soccer News	Philip Mayaka	Clemson	Reed Berry	Oral Roberts	Veljko Petkovic	Pittsburgh
College Soccer News	Aidan Morris	Indiana	Finn Ballard McBride	UC Santa Barbara	Uri Zeitz	Columbia
College Soccer News	Gino Vivi	UCF	Daniel Pereira	Virginia Tech	Christian Soto	Washington
College Soccer News	Daniel Wu	Georgetown	Charlie Sharp	Western Michigan	Jacobo Reyes	Portland
College Soccer News	Andreas Ueland	Virginia	Andrew Mitchell	Loyola Chicago	Noel Caliskan	LMU
College Soccer News	Keegan Hughes	Stanford	Nico Benalcazar	Wake Forest	Daniel Osuji	Loyola (MD)
College Soccer News	Tomas Romero	Georgetown	Moses Mensah	Campbell	Oskar Agren	Clemson
College Soccer News			Sam Fowler	Washington	Niklas Neumann	Maryland
Top Drawer Soccer	Aidan Morris	Indiana	Liam Butts	Penn State	Amferny Arias Sinclair	Syracuse
Top Drawer Soccer	Phillip Mayaka	Clemson	Christian Soto	Washington	Gino Vivi	UCF
Top Drawer Soccer	Wilmer Cabrera Jr.	Butler	Joshua Penn	Indiana	Veljko Petkovic	Pittsburgh
Top Drawer Soccer	Milo Yosef	Marshall	Daniel Wu	Georgetown	Nick Richardson	Maryland
Top Drawer Soccer	Noel Caliskan	LMU	Victor Bezerra	Indiana	Boyd Curry	Saint Mary's (CA)
Top Drawer Soccer	Ousseni Bouda	Stanford	Finn Ballard McBride	UC Santa Barbara	Herbert Endeley	Indiana
Top Drawer Soccer	Andreas Ueland	Virginia	Nico Benalcazar	Wake Forest	Dante Polvara	Georgetown
Top Drawer Soccer	Moses Mensah	Campbell	Keegan Hughes	Stanford	Uriel Zeitz	Columbia
Top Drawer Soccer	Daniel Pereira	Virginia Tech	Reed Berry	Oral Roberts	Stefan Sigurdarson	Boston College
Top Drawer Soccer	Kipp Keller	Saint Louis	Jacobo Reyes	Portland	Oskar Ågren	Clemson
Top Drawer Soccer	Tomas Romero	Georgetown	Sam Fowler	Washington	Esben Wolf	Providence
