= 2019 Big East Conference men's soccer season =

- League: NCAA Division I
- Sport: Soccer
- Duration: August 30, 2019 – November 2, 2019
- Teams: 10

2020 MLS SuperDraft
- Top draft pick: Dylan Nealis, 3rd overall
- Picked by: Inter Miami

Regular Season
- Season champions: Georgetown
- Runners-up: St. John's
- Season MVP: O: Tani Oluwasey; D: Dylan Nealis; M: Jacob Montes; G: Giannis Nikopolidis; G: Jan Hoffelner

Tournament
- Champions: Georgetown
- Runners-up: Providence
- Finals MVP: O: Dylan Nealis; D: Jack Beer

Big East Conference men's soccer seasons
- ← 2018 2020 →

2019 Big East Conference men's soccer standings
	Conf.					Overall
Team	W		L		T	W		L		T
No. 1 Georgetown ‡	7	–	0	–	2	18	–	1	–	4
No. 12 St. John's +	6	–	2	–	1	15	–	5	–	1
No. 14 Providence +	6	–	3	–	0	16	–	7	–	0
Creighton	4	–	4	–	1	8	–	7	–	2
Butler +	4	–	4	–	1	11	–	7	–	2
Marquette	4	–	5	–	0	8	–	9	–	1
Seton Hall	3	–	5	–	1	6	–	9	–	1
Xavier	3	–	6	–	0	8	–	8	–	1
Villanova	2	–	6	–	1	9	–	8	–	1
DePaul	1	–	5	–	3	5	–	9	–	3
‡ – 2019 Big East Tournament champion + – Invited to the 2019 NCAA tournament; As of 17 December 2019; Rankings from United Soccer Coaches

The 2019 Big East Conference men's soccer season was the seventh season for the realigned Big East Conference. Including the history of the original Big East Conference, this was the 24th season of men's soccer under the "Big East Conference" name. The regular season began on August 30 and concluded on November 2.

Entering the season, Georgetown were the defending conference tournament champions, while Creighton were the defending conference regular season champions. Georgetown successfully defended their Big East Tournament title, and also won the regular season.

Four Big East teams earned berths into the NCAA Tournament, where Georgetown won the NCAA Tournament Championship in penalty kicks against Virginia. This was Georgetown's first national championship in men's soccer, and their first College Cup appearance since 2012. Elsewhere, St. John's and Providence reached the Sweet Sixteen, losing to Virginia and Clemson, respectively, while Butler was eliminated in the first round by West Virginia.

== Coaching changes ==
Ahead of the 2019 season, Creighton head coach Elmar Bolowich was hired by professional soccer club, Jacksonville Armada FC. Johnny Torres was hired to replace Bolowich.

School	Outgoing coach	Manner of departure	Date of vacancy	Position in table	Incoming coach	Date of appointment
Creighton	(Germany) Elmar Bolowich	Resigned	November 12, 2018	Preseason	(Colombia) Johnny Torres	December 12, 2018

== Head coaches ==
As of the 2018 season

Team	Head coach	Previous job	Years at school	Overall record	Record at school	Big East record	NCAA Tournaments	NCAA College Cups	NCAA Titles	Ref.
Butler	Paul Snape	Michigan (asst.)	9	70–57–24 (.543)	70–57–24 (.543)	28–21–2 (.569)	2	0	0	
Creighton	Johnny Torres	Creighton (asst.)	1	0–0–0 (–)	0–0–0 (–)	0–0–0 (–)	0	0	0	
DePaul	Mark Plotkin	Colgate (asst.)	2	5–9–3 (.382)	5–9–3 (.382)	2–5–2 (.333)	0	0	0	
Georgetown	Brian Wiese	Notre Dame (asst.)	14	145–50–30 (.711)	145–50–30 (.711)	70–36–9 (.648)	6	1	0	
Marquette	Louis Bennett	Milwaukee	14	218–181–53 (.541)	83–117–36 (.428)	39–66–19 (.391)	7	0	0	
Providence	Craig Stewart	Franklin Pierce	8	121–58–24 (.655)	70–50–18 (.572)	32–21–9 (.589)	7	2	0	
Seton Hall	Andreas Lindberg	LIU Post	2	145–37–17 (.771)	6–7–2 (.467)	2–6–1 (.278)	8	0	0	
St. John's	David Masur	Montclair State	29	408–172–96 (.675)	355–151–90 (.671)	157–67–48 (.665)	20	4	1	
Villanova	Tom Carlin	Villanova (asst.)	12	86–84–20 (.505)	86–84–20 (.505)	38–52–12 (.431)	1	0	0	
Xavier	Andy Fleming	Northwestern (asst.)	10	98–55–30 (.617)	98–55–30 (.617)	28–23–5 (.545)	4	0	0	

== Preseason ==
=== Preseason poll ===
The preseason poll was released on August 21, 2019.

	Team ranking	Points	First
1.	Georgetown	81	9
2.	Creighton	68	0
3.	Providence	65	0
4.	Marquette	59	1
5.	Xavier	44	0
6.	Butler	40	0
7.	St. John's	33	0
8.	Seton Hall	28	0
9.	DePaul	21	0
10.	Villanova	11	0

=== Preseason national polls ===
The preseason national polls were released in July and August 2019.

	United; Soccer	CSN	Soccer; America	Top Drawer; Soccer
Butler	—	—	—	—
Creighton	RV	RV	—	—
DePaul	—	—	—	—
Georgetown	13	12	11	11
Marquette	—	—	—	—
Providence	—	—	—	—
Seton Hall	—	—	—	—
St. John's	—	—	—	—
Villanova	—	—	—	—
Xavier	—	—	—	TBD

=== Preseason All-Conference Teams ===
All conference teams were announced in conjunction with the preseason poll.

Award	Recipient(s)
Preseason Offensive Player of the Year	Derek Dodson, Georgetown
Preseason Defensive Player of the Year	Dylan Nealis, Georgetown
Preseason Goalkeeper of the Year	Paul Kruse, Creighton
Preseason All-Big East	Derek Dodson, Georgetown
Preseason All-Big East	Ifunanyachi Achara, Georgetown
Preseason All-Big East	C.J. Tibbling, Seton Hall
Preseason All-Big East	Samson Sergi, Xavier
Preseason All-Big East	Luka Prpa, Marquette
Preseason All-Big East	Skage Simonsen, St. John's
Preseason All-Big East	Tiago Mendonca, Providence
Preseason All-Big East	Jared Timmer, Butler
Preseason All-Big East	Dylan Nealis, Georgetown
Preseason All-Big East	Patrick Seagrist, Marquette
Preseason All-Big East	Max de Bruijne, DePaul
Preseason All-Big East	Paul Kruse, Creighton

== Regular season ==
=== Early season tournaments ===
Early season tournaments will be announced in late Spring and Summer 2019.

Team	Tournament	Finish

== Postseason ==
=== Big East Tournament ===
The 2019 Big East Tournament was held from November 9–17, 2019. Georgetown won the championship against Providence.

First Round; November 9
4	Creighton	0
5	Butler	1
3	Providence	1
6	Marquette	0

Semifinals; November 15
1	Georgetown	2(4)
5	Butler	2(3)
2	St. John's	1
3	Providence	2

Championship; November 17
1	Georgetown	3
3	Providence	1

=== NCAA Tournament ===
The NCAA Tournament will begin in November 2019 and conclude on December 17, 2019.

Seed	Region	School	1st Round	2nd Round	3rd Round	Quarterfinals	Semifinals	Championship
3	3	Georgetown	BYE	W 5–0 vs. Pitt – (Washington, DC)	W 5–1 vs. Louisville – (Washington, DC)	W 2–1 vs. #4 Washington – (Washington, DC)	W 2–0 vs. #7 Stanford – (Cary, NC)	T 3–3 (7–6 PKs) vs. Virginia – (Cary, NC)
16	1	St. John's	BYE	W 2–0 vs. Syracuse – (New York, NY)	L 0–3 vs. #1 Virginia – (Charlottesville, VA)			
—	4	Providence	W 2–0 vs. NJIT – (Providence, RI)	W 3–2 (OT) vs. #15 Penn State – (State College, PA)	L 1–2 (OT) vs. #2 Clemson – (Clemson, SC)			
—	3	Butler	L 1–5 vs. West Virginia – (Indianapolis, IN)					

== Rankings ==
=== National rankings ===
	Improvement in ranking
	Drop in ranking
RV	Received votes but were not ranked in Top 25
NV	No votes received

		Pre	Wk 1	Wk 2	Wk 3	Wk 4	Wk 5	Wk 6	Wk 7	Wk 8	Wk 9	Wk 10	Wk 11	Wk 12	Wk 13	Wk 14	Wk 15	Wk 16	Final
Butler	USC	NV	NV	NV	NV	NV	NV	NV	NV	NV	NV	NV	NV	RV	None released				NV
Butler	TDS	NV	NV	NV	NV	NV	NV	NV	NV	NV	NV	NV	NV	NV	RV	NV	NV	NV	NV
Creighton	USC	RV	RV	RV	NV	RV	RV	RV	NV	NV	NV	NV	NV	NV	None released				NV
Creighton	TDS	RV	RV	RV	NV	NV	NV	NV	NV	NV	NV	NV	NV	NV	NV	NV	NV	NV	NV
DePaul	USC	NV	NV	NV	NV	NV	NV	NV	NV	NV	NV	NV	NV	NV	None released				NV
DePaul	TDS	NV	NV	NV	NV	NV	NV	NV	NV	NV	NV	NV	NV	NV	NV	NV	NV	NV	NV
Georgetown	USC	13	6	5	3	2	5	12	13	7	3	3	3	2	None released				1
Georgetown	TDS	11	11	9	6	4	5	5	6	5	2	2	2	2	2	2	2	2	1
Marquette	USC	NV	NV	NV	NV	NV	NV	NV	NV	NV	NV	NV	NV	NV	None released				NV
Marquette	TDS	NV	NV	NV	NV	NV	NV	NV	NV	NV	NV	NV	NV	NV	NV	NV	NV	NV	NV
Providence	USC	NV	NV	NV	NV	NV	NV	NV	RV	NV	NV	NV	RV	21	None released				14
Providence	TDS	NV	NV	NV	NV	NV	NV	NV	NV	NV	NV	NV	NV	RV	19	13	11	11	11
Seton Hall	USC	NV	NV	NV	NV	NV	NV	NV	NV	NV	NV	NV	NV	NV	None released				NV
Seton Hall	TDS	NV	NV	NV	NV	NV	NV	NV	NV	NV	NV	NV	NV	NV	NV	NV	NV	NV	NV
St. John's	USC	NV	RV	19	9	9	12	10	7	4	8	8	14	14	None released				12
St. John's	TDS	NV	NV	NV	RV	16	12	12	14	9	9	12	12	16	17	15	16	16	16
Villanova	USC	NV	NV	RV	RV	NV	NV	NV	NV	NV	NV	NV	NV	NV	None released				NV
Villanova	TDS	NV	NV	NV	NV	NV	NV	NV	NV	NV	NV	NV	NV	NV	NV	NV	NV	NV	NV
Xavier	USC	NV	14	11	19	RV	NV	NV	NV	NV	NV	NV	NV	NV	None released				NV
Xavier	TDS	NV	RV	10	10	11	25	RV	NV	NV	NV	NV	NV	NV	NV	NV	NV	NV	NV

=== Regional rankings - USC East Region ===
	Improvement in ranking
	Drop in ranking
RV	Received votes but were not ranked in Top 10
NV	No votes received

	Wk 1	Wk 2	Wk 3	Wk 4	Wk 5	Wk 6	Wk 7	Wk 8	Wk 9	Wk 10	Wk 11	Wk 12
Butler	10	9	8	NV	NV	NV	9	6	7	8	6	6
Creighton	NV	8	9	5	5	7	NV	NV	NV	NV	NV	NV
DePaul	NV	NV	NV	NV	NV	NV	NV	NV	NV	NV	NV	NV
Georgetown	1	1	1	1	2	4	4	2	1	1	1	1
Marquette	NV	NV	10	RV	9	NV	NV	NV	NV	NV	NV	NV
Providence	NV	NV	NV	6	7	10	7	8	6	6	5	4
Seton Hall	NV	NV	NV	NV	NV	NV	NV	NV	NV	NV	NV	NV
St. John's	5	3	2	2	4	2	2	1	3	3	4	5
Villanova	9	6	6	9	NV	9	10	9	NV	NV	NV	NV
Xavier	2	2	7	10	NV	NV	NV	NV	NV	NV	NV	NV

== Awards and honors ==
=== Player of the week honors ===
Week	Offensive			Defensive			Goalkeeper		Freshman			Ref.
Week	Player	Pos.	Team	Player	Pos.	Team	Player	Team	Player	Pos.	Team	Ref.
Sep. 2	Stephen Elias	FW	Seton Hall	Luke Hansen	DF	St. John's	Matthew Rosenberg	Xavier	Jackson Weyman	GK	Marquette	
Sep. 9	Samson Sergi	FW	Xavier	Sean O'Hearn	DF	Georgetown	Carson Williams	Villanova	Dominic Briggs	FW	Creighton	
Sep. 16	Zach Riviere	FW	Georgetown	Matt Chandler	DF	St. John's	Carson Williams	Villanova	Wilmer Cabrera	FW	Butler	
Sept. 23	Niko Petridis	MF	St. John's	Dylan Nealis	DF	Georgetown	Collin Valdivia	Creighton	Luke Mitchell	MF	Creighton	
Sep. 30	Yudai Tashiro	MF	St. John's	Rafael Bustamente	DF	St. John's	Jackson Weyman	Marquette	Christian Marquez	FW	Marquette	
Oct. 7	Tani Oluwaseyi	FW	St. John's	Love Frederiksson	DF	Seton Hall	Carson Williams	Villanova	Brendan Hicks	DF	Butler	
Oct. 14	Ifunanyachi Achara	FW	Georgetown	Brandon Duarte	MF	St. John's	Giannis Nikopolidis	Georgetown	Esben Wolf	MF	Providence	
Oct. 21	Wilmer Cabrera Jr.	FW	Butler	Dylan Nealis	DF	Georgetown	Gabriel Gjergji	Butler	Wilmer Cabrera Jr.	FW	Butler	
Oct. 28	Derek Dodson	FW	Georgetown	Dylan Nealis	DF	Georgetown	Matthew Rosenberg	Xavier	Karsen Henderlong	FW	Xavier	
Nov. 4	Carlton McKenzie	FW	Seton Hall	Ramzi Qawasmy	DF	Providence	Tomas Romero	Georgetown	Jake Ashford	DF	Creighton	

=== Postseason honors ===
2019 Big East Men's Soccer Individual Awards
Award	Recipient(s)
Offensive Player of the Year	Tani Oluwasey – St. John's
Defensive Player of the Year	Dylan Nealis – Georgetown
Midfielder of the Year	Jacob Montes – Georgetown
Co-Goalkeepers of the Year	Giannis Nikopolidis – Georgetown
Co-Goalkeepers of the Year	Jan Hoffelner – St. John's
Coach of the Year	Dave Masur – St. John's
Freshman of the Year	Wilmer Cabrera Jr. – Butler

2019 Big East Men's Soccer All-Conference Teams
First Team Honorees	Second Team Honorees	Third Team Honorees
Derek Dodson, Georgetown; Tani Oluwaseyi, St. John's; Samson Sergi, Xavier; Yudai Tashiro, Creighton; Jacob Montes, Georgetown; Tiago Mendonca, Providence; Max de Bruijne, DePaul; Dylan Nealis, Georgetown; Patrick Seagrist, Marquette; Joao Serrano, Providence; Giannis Nikopolidis, Georgetown	Wilmer Cabrera Jr., Butler; Luke Haakenson, Creighton; Achara, Georgetown; Carlton McKenzie, Seton Hall; Sean Zawadzki, Georgetown; Luka Prpa, Marquette; Paulo Lima, Providence; Skage Simonsen, St. John's; Younes Boudadi, Creighton; Brandon Duarte, St. John's; Shane Bradley, Villanova; Jan Hoffelner, St. John's	Brandon Guhl, Butler; Jack Haywood, Butler; Jared Timmer, Butler; Kuba Polat, Creighton; Connor Alba, Marquette; Josh Coan, Marquette; Austin Aviza, Providence; Danny Griffin, Providence; Brandon Knapp, St. John's; Einar Lye, St. John's; Derrick Otim, Xavier; Matthew Rosenberg, Xavier

=== All-Americans ===
Consensus All-Americans
Dylan Nealis – Georgetown

To earn "consensus" status, a player must win honors based on a point system computed from the four different all-America teams. The point system consists of three points for first team, two points for second team and one point for third team. No honorable mention or fourth team or lower are used in the computation. The top five totals plus ties are first team and the next five plus ties are second team.

College Soccer News	Soccer America	Top Drawer Soccer	United Soccer Coaches
First Team
Dylan Nealis – Georgetown	Dylan Nealis – Georgetown	Dylan Nealis – Georgetown; Jacob Montes – Georgetown	Dylan Nealis – Georgetown
Second Team
Jacob Montes – Georgetown	None	None	Jacob Montes – Georgetown; Derek Dodson – Georgetown
Third Team
None	Jacob Montes – Georgetown; Derek Dodson – Georgetown	Sean Zawadzki – Georgetown	Jacob Montes – Georgetown; Derek Dodson – Georgetown

== 2020 MLS Draft ==
The 2020 MLS SuperDraft was held on January 9, 2020.

Rnd.	Pick	Player	Pos.	Team	School
1	3	Dylan Nealis	MF	Inter Miami	Georgetown (Sr.)
1	10	Patrick Seagrist	DF	New York Red Bulls	Marquette (Sr.)
1	25	Ifunanyachi Achara	FW	Toronto FC	Georgetown (Sr.)
2	34	Luka Prpa	FW	Houston Dynamo	Marquette (Sr.)
2	44	Austin Aviza	FW	Orlando City	Providence (RS-Sr.)
2	49	Danny Griffin	MF	Columbus Crew	Providence (Sr.)
4	80	Luke Haakenson	MF	Nashville SC	Creighton (Sr.)
4	93	Niko Petridis	MF	New York Red Bulls	St. John's (Sr.)
4	102	Younes Boudadi	DF	Los Angeles FC	Creighton (Sr.)

== Homegrown players ==
The Homegrown Player Rule is a Major League Soccer program that allows MLS teams to sign local players from their own development academies directly to MLS first team rosters. Before the creation of the rule in 2008, every player entering Major League Soccer had to be assigned through one of the existing MLS player allocation processes, such as the MLS SuperDraft.

To place a player on its homegrown player list, making him eligible to sign as a homegrown player, players must have resided in that club's home territory and participated in the club's youth development system for at least one year. Players can play college soccer and still be eligible to sign a homegrown contract.

No players in the Big East Conference signed homegrown contracts.
