= 2019 NCAA Division I men's soccer championship game =

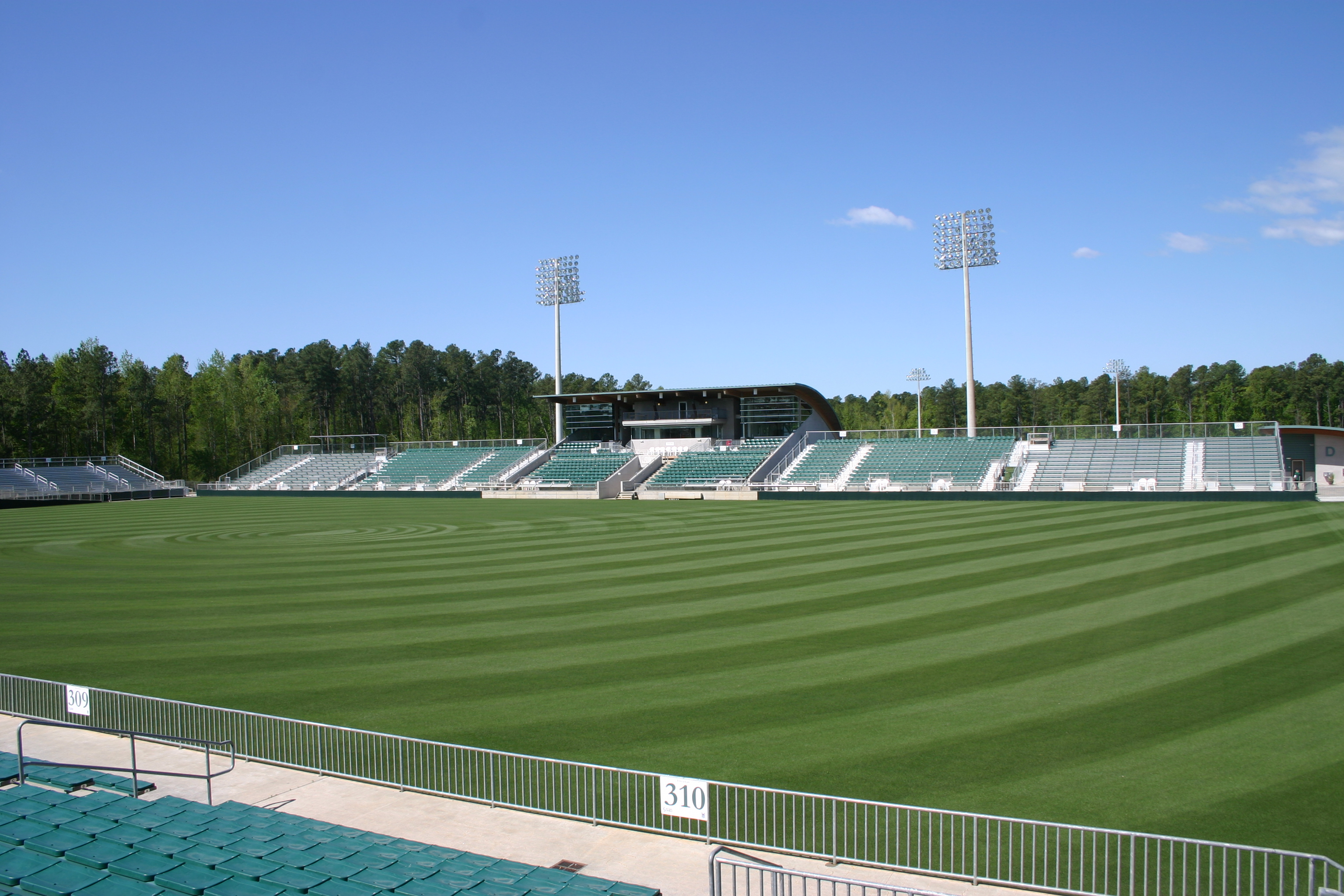
- WakeMed Soccer Park hosted the final
- Event: 2019 NCAA Division I Men's Soccer Tournament
Virginia	Georgetown
ACC	Big East
3	3
- Georgetown won 7–6 on penalties.
- Date: December 15, 2019
- Venue: WakeMed Soccer Park, Cary, North Carolina, U.S.
- Man of the Match: Dylan Nealis
- Referee: Rubiel Vazquez
- Attendance: 8,413
- Weather: Clear and 54 °F (12 °C)

The 2019 NCAA Division I men's soccer championship game (also known as the 2019 NCAA Division I Men's College Cup) was played on December 15, 2019, at WakeMed Soccer Park in Cary, North Carolina and determined the winner of the 2019 NCAA Division I Men's Soccer Tournament, the national collegiate soccer championship in the United States. This was the 61st edition of the oldest active competition in United States college soccer.

The match featured Georgetown University of the Big East Conference, and the University of Virginia of the Atlantic Coast Conference. It was the first time in NCAA Tournament history that the final featured two programs from the Washington, D.C. metro area. This was also the highest scoring national final since 1980.

== Road to the final ==
The NCAA Division I Men's Soccer Tournament, sometimes known as the College Cup, is an American intercollegiate soccer tournament conducted by the National Collegiate Athletic Association (NCAA), and determines the Division I men's national champion. The tournament has been formally held since 1959, when it was an eight-team tournament. Since then, the tournament has expanded to 48 teams, in which every Division I conference tournament champion is allocated a berth. It was Georgetowns's first appearance since 2012, which they lost their sole NCAA final appearance against Indiana, and Virginia's first appearance since 2014, where they defeated UCLA. Virginia has won the NCAA Tournament on seven previous occasions: 1989, 1991, 1992, 1993, 1994, 2009, and 2014.

Virginia (ACC)		Round	Georgetown (Big East)	
Opponent	Result	Conference Tournament	Opponent	Result
Syracuse	2–1 (H)	Quarterfinals	Bye	—N/a
Wake Forest	1–0 (N)	Semifinals	Butler	2–2 (H)
Clemson	3–1 (N)	Championship	Providence	3–1 (H)
Opponent	Result	NCAA Tournament	Opponent	Result
Bye	—N/a	First Round	Bye	—N/a
Campbell (Big South)	2–0 (H)	Second Round	Pitt (ACC)	5–0 (H)
St. John's (Big East)	3–0 (H)	Third Round (Sweet 16)	Louisville (ACC)	5–1 (H)
SMU (American)	3–2 (H)	Quarterfinals (Elite 8)	Washington (Pac-12)	2–1 (H)
Wake Forest (ACC)	2–1 (N)	College Cup (Final 4)	Stanford (Pac-12)	2–0 (N)

=== Georgetown ===
Georgetown University was making their second appearance in the College Cup final, having previously reached the final in 2012, where they lost to Indiana. On November 17, the program qualified for the NCAA Tournament by winning the 2019 Big East Conference Men's Soccer Tournament, 3–1 over Providence, claiming the conference's automatic berth into the NCAA Tournament. It was the Hoyas' third consecutive Big East Tournament title, and their fourth overall. Georgetown had also won the Big East regular season championship, giving the Hoyas their second consecutive Big East regular season title, and their seventh overall. Entering the national championship game, Georgetown accumulated a record of 19–1–3 across all competitions, and a 7–0–2 record in Big East play. Jacob Montes led the Hoyas will 11 goals during the season, and Derek Dodson led the Hoyas with eight 8 assists and 26 points during the season.

Entering the NCAA Tournament, Georgetown was ranked second overall in the United Soccer Coaches poll, and were given the third overall seed, allowing them to earn a bye into the second round of the tournament. On November 24, in the second round, Georgetown hosted ACC outfit, Pitt, who were making their first NCAA Tournament appearance since 1965. Two goals from Dylan Nealis, strikes from Foster McCune and Dodson, along with an own goal from Pitt, gave the Hoyas a 5–0 victory over Pitt, their largest margin of victory all season. Louisville upset the 14th seeded UC Davis in the second round, giving Georgetown a third round (Sweet 16) matchup with another ACC outfit: Louisville Cardinals. On December 1, Georgetown defeated Louisville. Georgetown once again scored five goals in the match, giving the Hoyas a 5–1 victory over Louisville. Paul Rothrock and Montes each scored twice, and Jack Beer added an additional goal for the Hoyas. Louisville's Pedro Fonseca scored the team's only goal against Georgetown.

On December 7, in the Quarterfinals (Elite 8), Georgetown hosted the Pac-12 champions, and the 6th-seeded, Washington Huskies. The Huskies raced out to a quick lead, thanks to a Jaret Townsend strike in the fourth minute, causing Georgetown to be trailing for the first time throughout the tournament. Midway through the second half, Montes and Dodson each scored quick succession goals to give the Hoyas a 2–1 lead, which proved to be the final score, and allowed Georgetown to book their trip to the College Cup (Final 4) for the first time since 2012.

On December 13, the College Cup semifinal round was held. The Semifinals were played at the neutral site WakeMed Soccer Park in Cary, North Carolina, where Georgetown played against the seventh-seeded Stanford. Stanford had won the NCAA College Cup thrice between 2015 and 2017 before exiting in the quarterfinals in 2018, and were making their seventh College Cup appearance, their fourth in the last five years. In cold and wet conditions, Georgetown prevailed 2–0 over Stanford. Sean Zawadzki opened the scoring for the Hoyas in the fourth minute of play, and McCune scored the insurance goal for Georgetown in the 67th minute.

=== Virginia ===
The University of Virginia was making their ninth appearance in the national championship. Of the previous eight finals, Virginia had won seven of the finals, with their last loss in a national championship coming in 1997. Virginia booked their record 39th consecutive appearance in the NCAA Division I Men's Soccer Tournament on November 17, with a 3–1 against Clemson in the ACC Men's Soccer Championship Game. It was Virginia's first ACC Men's Soccer Tournament title since 2009, and their 11th overall ACC Tournament championship. Additionally, Virginia had won their first regular season championship since 2010, accumulating a conference record of 6–1–1. The regular season title was Virginia's 19th overall ACC Regular Season championship. Entering the national championship game, Virginia had a record of 21–1–1. Daryl Dike led Virginia during the 2019 in both goals and assists, notching nine goals and eight total assists.

Entering the NCAA Tournament, Virginia was ranked atop all major collegiate soccer polls (United Soccer, TopDrawer Soccer, SBI, and College Soccer News). Virginia also earned the number one overall seed in the NCAA Tournament, allowing them to earn a bye to the second round proper of the tournament. The Cavaliers first NCAA Tournament game came on November 24, where they hosted the Big South Conference champions, Campbell. Virginia won the game 2–0 thanks to a 38th-minute goal by Spencer Patton and an 85th-minute goal by Nathaniel Crofts. The Cavaliers hosted the sixteenth-seeded, and Big East semifinalists, St. John's in the third round (Sweet Sixteen) on November 30. Three first half goals by the Cavaliers proved to be the difference in the match. Andreas Ueland netted two early goals in the 4th and 15th minutes of play, before Joe Bell notched the final goal of the match in the 37th minute.

The following week, on December 6, Virginia hosted the American Athletic Conference champions, and 8th-seeded, SMU. In a five-goal match, Virginia prevailed on a golden goal to win 3–2. Virginia's Axel Gunnarson opened the scoring in the 18th minute, before SMU's Gabriel Costa tied the match in the 71st minute. Bell would score the goal-ahead goal for the Cavaliers in the 78th minute before the Mustangs tied the game again in the 84th minute, thanks to a header by Henrik Bredeli. In the 95th minute, Bell scored the match-winning goal, sending Virginia to the College Cup for the 13th time in program history, and for the first time since 2014.

On December 13, Virginia played fellow ACC outfit, Wake Forest in the College Cup Semifinals, which was the second match of a doubleheader at WakeMed Soccer Park. In front of a crowd of 9,862, Virginia's Daryl Dike scored two first half goals, in the 19th and 23rd minutes, to give Virginia an early 2–0 lead over the Demon Deacons. Wake Forest captain, Bruno Lapa, scored a late goal for the Demon Deacons in the 79th minute, but the Cavaliers defense would prevail, to send Virginia to the national championship.

== Pre-match ==
=== Venue selection ===
The National Collegiate Athletic Association determined the host of the final on April 18, 2017. The announcement of WakeMed Soccer Park was in conjunction with Meredith Field at Harder Stadium being announced as the 2018 and 2020 College Cup venue, while WakeMed would host the College Cup again in 2021.

== Match ==
=== Details ===
December 15, 2019
6:00 PM EST

Virginia	3–3 (a.e.t.)	Georgetown
Bell 10'; Steedman 58'; Dike 86'	Report	Rothrock 16'; Wu 22'; Dodson 81'
Penalties
Bell (penalty scored); Steedman (penalty scored); Donasiyano (penalty scored); Ueland (penalty scored); Crofts (penalty scored); Halsey (penalty scored); Gunnarsson (penalty missed)	6–7	(penalty scored) O'Hearn; (penalty scored) Riviere; (penalty scored) Beer; (penalty scored) Polvara; (penalty scored) Fischer; (penalty scored) Wu; (penalty scored) Rocha

WakeMed Soccer Park, Cary
Attendance: 8,413
Referee: Rubiel Vazquez

Virginia	Georgetown

GK	1	(United States) Colin Shutler
DF	5	(United States) Henry Kessler		(yellow card) 70'
DF	13	(United States) Bret Halsey		(yellow card) 88'
DF	17	(Norway) Andreas Ueland		(yellow card) 50'
DF	30	(Germany) Robin Afamefuna	(substituted off) 78'	(yellow card) 78'
MF	7	(Scotland) Daniel Steedman		58'
MF	8	(New Zealand) Joe Bell		10' (yellow card) 67'
MF	11	(Tanzania) Irakoze Donasiyano
FW	9	(United States) Daryl Dike		(yellow card) 86' (goal) 86'
FW	10	(England) Nathaniel Crofts
FW	18	(Sweden) Axel Gunnarsson	(substituted off) 55' (substituted on) 72'
Substitutes:
DF	12	(United States) Spencer Patton	(substituted on) 55' (substituted off) 72' (substituted on) 87'	(yellow card) 108'
FW	20	(Zimbabwe) Cabrel Happi Kamseu	(substituted on) 85' (substituted off) 87'
MF	21	(United States) Aaron James	(substituted on) 78' (substituted off) 85'
Manager:
(United States) George Gelnovatch

GK	30	(El Salvador) Tomás Romero
RB	12	(United States) Dylan Nealis	(substituted off) 104'
CB	5	(United States) Daniel Wu (c)		22'
CB	2	(United States) Rio Hope-Gund
LB	4	(United States) Sean O'Hearn		(yellow card) 86'
RM	8	(France) J.B. Fischer	(substituted off) 22' (substituted on) 75' (substituted off) 85' (substituted on) 98' (substituted off) 106'
CM	7	(United States) Jacob Montes	(substituted off) 37' (substituted on) 46' (substituted off) 62' (substituted on) 70'
CM	3	(United States) Paul Rothrock	(substituted off) 22' (substituted on) 46' (substituted off) 58' (substituted on) 91' (substituted off) 98'	16'
LM	6	(United States) Sean Zawadzki
ST	27	(United States) Zach Riviere	(substituted off) 22' (substituted on) 58' (substituted off) 70' (substituted on) 98'
ST	9	(United States) Derek Dodson	(substituted off) 37' (substituted on) 46' (substituted off) 62' (substituted on) 70' (substituted off) 98' (substituted on) 101' (substituted off) 108'	81'
Substitutes:
FW	20	(Nigeria) Ifunanyachi Achara	(substituted on) 22' (substituted off) 31' (substituted on) 70' (substituted off) 84'
MF	11	(United States) Jack Beer	(substituted on) 31' (substituted off) 46' (substituted on) 62' (substituted off) 77' (substituted on) 91' (substituted off) 98'
MF	10	(United States) Ethan Lochner	(substituted on) 37' (substituted off) 46'
DF	22	(United States) Foster McCune	(substituted on) 44' (substituted off) 58' (substituted on) 77' (substituted off) 91' (substituted on) 101'
DF	17	(United States) Dante Polvara	(substituted on) 22' (substituted off) 75' (substituted on) 85' (substituted off) 98' (substituted on) 106'	(yellow card) 90'
MF	18	(United States) Aidan Rocha	(substituted on) 104'
FW	14	(United States) Will Sands	(substituted on) 22' (substituted off) 44' (substituted on) 58' (substituted off) 70' (substituted on) 84' (substituted off) 91' (substituted on) 98' (substituted off) 101'	(yellow card) 64'
FW	13	(United States) Riley Strassner	(substituted on) 37' (substituted off) 46' (substituted on) 62' (substituted off) 70' (substituted on) 98' (substituted off) 101' (substituted on) 108'
Manager:
(United States) Brian Wiese

College Cup MVP
Amar Sejdic (Maryland)

Assistant referees:
Danny Thornberry (United States)
Tom Felice (United States)
Fourth official:
Chris Penso (United States)

Match rules:

- 90 minutes.
- 20 minutes of extra time if necessary.
- Penalty shoot-out if scores still level.
- Unlimited substitutes, may not return if subbed out in the first half; may return unlimited times in the second half.

=== Statistics ===
Overall
	Maryland	Akron
Goals scored	1	0
Total shots	15	10
Shots on target	8	2
Saves	2	7
Corner kicks	7	5
Fouls committed	10	7
Offsides	0	0
Yellow cards	1	3
Red cards	0	1
