= 2019 Georgetown Hoyas men's soccer team =

American college soccer season

2019 Georgetown Hoyas men's soccer

Big East regular season champions Big East Tournament champions

NCAA Tournament National Champions
- Conference: Big East Conference
- U. Soc. Coaches poll: No. 2
- TopDrawerSoccer.com: No. 1
- Record: 20–1–3 (7–0–2 Big East)
- Head coach: Brian Wiese (14th season)
- Assistant coaches: Mike Casper (1st season); Connor Klekota (2nd season); Brian Bouhl (2nd season)
- Captains: Dylan Nealis; Achara; Derek Dodson
- Home stadium: Shaw Field

2019 Big East Conference men's soccer standings
	Conf.					Overall
Team	W		L		T	W		L		T
No. 1 Georgetown ‡	7	–	0	–	2	18	–	1	–	4
No. 12 St. John's +	6	–	2	–	1	15	–	5	–	1
No. 14 Providence +	6	–	3	–	0	16	–	7	–	0
Creighton	4	–	4	–	1	8	–	7	–	2
Butler +	4	–	4	–	1	11	–	7	–	2
Marquette	4	–	5	–	0	8	–	9	–	1
Seton Hall	3	–	5	–	1	6	–	9	–	1
Xavier	3	–	6	–	0	8	–	8	–	1
Villanova	2	–	6	–	1	9	–	8	–	1
DePaul	1	–	5	–	3	5	–	9	–	3
‡ – 2019 Big East Tournament champion + – Invited to the 2019 NCAA tournament; As of 17 December 2019; Rankings from United Soccer Coaches

The 2019 Georgetown Hoyas men's soccer team represented the Georgetown University during the 2019 NCAA Division I men's soccer season and the 2019 Big East Conference men's soccer season. The regular season began on August 30 and concluded on November 6. It was the program's 68th season fielding a men's varsity soccer team, and their 24th season in the Big East Conference. The 2019 season was Brian Wiese's 14th year as head coach for the program. The Hoyas concluded their season with their first national championship in program history, defeating top-seeded Virginia in the NCAA Tournament.

== Squad ==
=== Roster ===
As of December 9, 2019

Note: Flags indicate national team as defined under FIFA eligibility rules; some limited exceptions apply. Players may hold more than one non-FIFA nationality.

No.	Pos.	Nation	Player
0	GK	GRE	Giannis Nikopolidis
1	GK	USA	Maurice Coyle
2	DF	USA	Rio Hope-Gund
3	MF	USA	Paul Rothrock
4	DF	USA	Sean O'Hearn
5	DF	USA	Daniel Wu
6	MF	USA	Sean Zawadzki
7	MF	USA	Jacob Montes
8	MF	FRA	JB Fischer
9	FW	USA	Derek Dodson
10	FW	USA	Ethan Lochner
11	FW	USA	Jack Beer
12	MF	USA	Dylan Nealis
13	FW	USA	Riley Strassner
14	FW	USA	Will Sands

No.	Pos.	Nation	Player
15	DF	USA	Owen Varela
17	MF	USA	Dante Polvara
18	MF	USA	Aidan Rocha
19	DF	USA	Austin Riddick
20	FW	NGA	Ifunanyachi Achara
21	MF	USA	Jorge Burke
22	DF	USA	Foster McCune
23	MF	USA	Chris Le
24	GK	USA	Ethan Koehler
25	DF	ISL	Siggi Geirsson
26	FW	USA	Witt Conger
27	MF	USA	Zach Riviere
28	DF	USA	Joe DaLuz
30	GK	USA	Tomas Romero

== Schedule ==
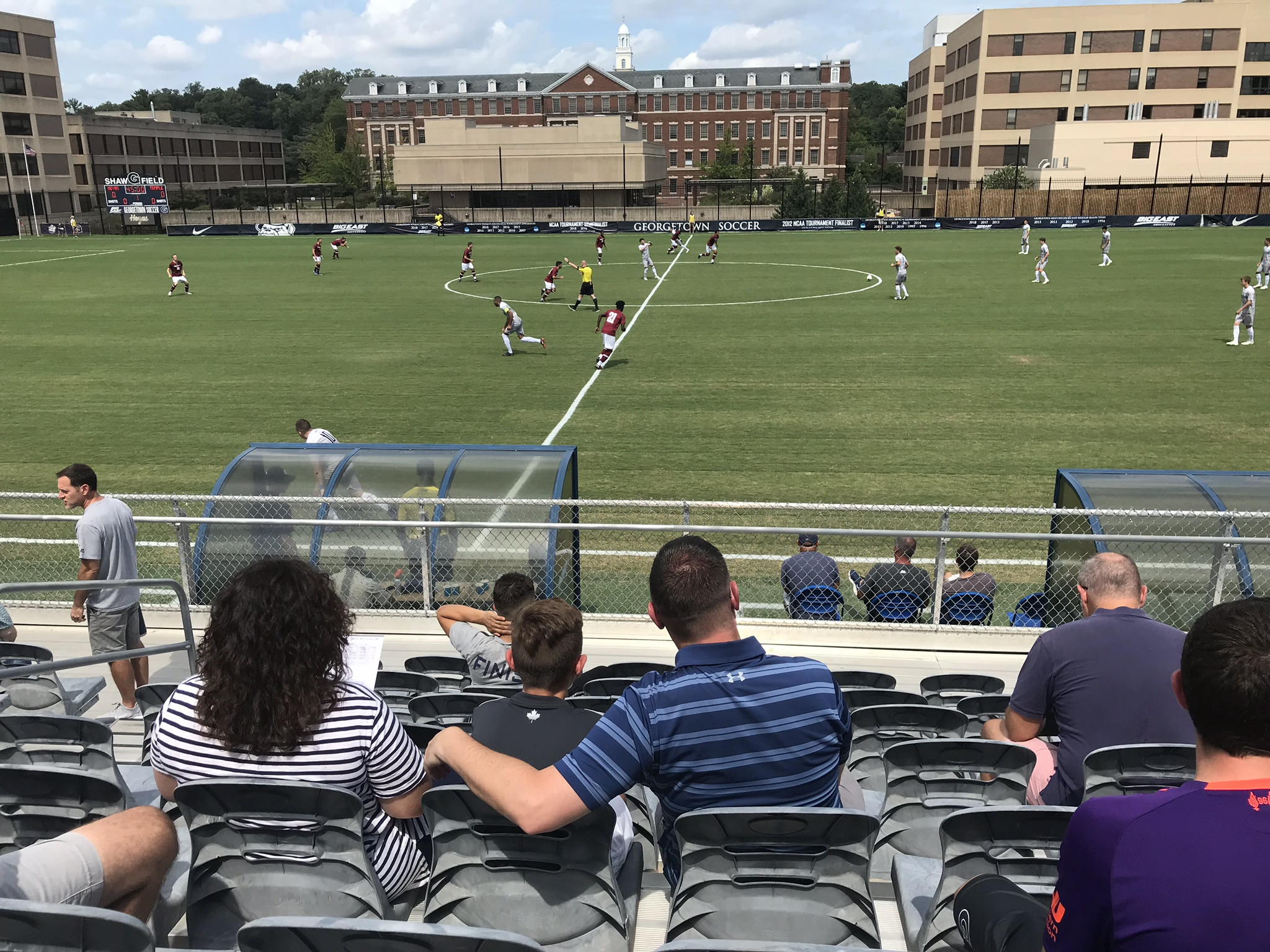
Georgetown faces off against Temple on September 2, 2019, in their second game of the season. Georgetown would win the game 3–0.

Date Time, TV	Rank^{#}	Opponent^{#}	Result	Record	Site (Attendance) City, State
Non-conference regular season
August 30*; 4:00 p.m.	No. 13	Syracuse	W 3–1	1–0–0	Shaw Field (1,121); Washington, D.C.
September 2*; 1:00 p.m.	No. 13	Temple	W 3–0	2–0–0	Shaw Field (799); Washington, D.C.
September 6*; 10:00 p.m.	No. 6	at No. 25 UC Irvine	W 1–0	3–0–0	Anteater Stadium (394); Irvine, CA
September 9*; 8:00 p.m., P12N	No. 6	at UCLA	W 5–1	4–0–0	Wallis Annenberg Stadium (448); Los Angeles, CA
September 14*; 1:00 p.m.	No. 5	UConn; Rivalry	W 4–1	5–0–0	Shaw Field (897); Washington, D.C.
Big East Conference regular season
September 20; 7:00 p.m., BEDN	No. 3	at Butler	W 3–0	6–0–0 (1–0–0)	Sellick Bowl (1,038); Indianapolis, IN
September 24*; 7:00 p.m., ACCN	No. 2	at No. 17 Louisville	L 0–1 ^{2OT}	6–1–0	Lynn Stadium (1,053); Louisville, KY
September 28; 1:00 p.m., BEDN	No. 2	Providence	W 2–1	7–1–0 (2–0–0)	Shaw Field (891); Washington, D.C.
October 4; 3:00 p.m.	No. 5	at DePaul	T 0–0	7–1–1 (2–0–1)	Cacciatore Stadium (214); Chicago, IL
October 8*; 3:00 p.m.	No. 12	Lehigh	W 2–0	8–1–1	Shaw Field (289); Washington, D.C.
October 11; 3:00 p.m.	No. 12	Seton Hall	W 2–0	9–1–1 (3–0–1)	Shaw Field (679); Washington, D.C.
October 14*; 7:00 p.m., FS1	No. 12	at No. 25 Maryland	W 1–0	10–1–1	Ludwig Field; College Park, MD
October 19; 1:00 p.m., BEDN	No. 13	Xavier	W 1–0	11–1–1 (4–0–1)	Shaw Field (1,663); Washington, D.C.
October 23; 7:00 p.m., BEDN	No. 7	at No. 4 St. John's	W 3–0	12–1–1 (5–0–1)	Belson Stadium (1,663); New York City, NY
October 26; 1:00 p.m., BEDN	No. 7	Marquette	W 3–0	13–1–1 (6–0–1)	Shaw Field (779); Washington, D.C.
November 2; 1:00 p.m., BEDN	No. 3	at Villanova	W 2–0	14–1–1 (7–0–1)	Higgins Soccer Complex (912); Villanova, PA
November 6; 2:00 p.m., BEDN	No. 3	Creighton	T 1–1 ^{2OT}	14–1–2 (7–0–2)	Shaw Field (399); Washington, D.C.
Big East Conference Tournament
November 13; 1:00 p.m., BEDN	(1) No. 3	(5) Butler; Semifinals	T 2–2 (4–3 PKs) ^{2OT}	14–1–3	Shaw Field (177); Washington, D.C.
November 17; 12:00 p.m., FS2	(1) No. 3	(3) Providence; Finals	W 3–1	15–1–3	Shaw Field (1,031); Washington, D.C.
NCAA Tournament
November 24*; 12:00 p.m., BEDN	(3) No. 2	vs. Pittsburgh; Second Round	W 5–0	16–1–3	Shaw Field (1,497); Washington, D.C.
December 1*; 12:00 p.m., BEDN	(3) No. 2	vs. Louisville; Third Round	W 5–1	17–1–3	Shaw Field (773); Washington, D.C.
December 7*; 12:00 p.m., BEDN	(3) No. 2	vs. (6) No. 4 Washington; Quarterfinals	W 2–1	18–1–3	Shaw Field (2,093); Washington, D.C.
December 13*; 6:00 p.m., ESPNU	(3) No. 2	vs. (7) No. 7 Stanford; College Cup Semifinals	W 2–0	19–1–3	WakeMed Soccer Park (9,862); Cary, NC
December 15*; 6:00 p.m., ESPNU	(3) No. 2	vs. (1) No. 1 Virginia; College Cup Championship	W 3–3 (7–6 PKs) ^{2OT}	20–1–3	WakeMed Soccer Park (8,413); Cary, NC
*Non-conference game. ^{#}Rankings from United Soccer Coaches. (#) Tournament seedings in parentheses. All times are in Eastern Time.
