= 1996 St. John's Red Storm men's soccer team =

American college soccer season

1996 St. John's Red Storm men's soccer

Big East regular season champion Rutgers Met-Life Classic champion

NCAA National Champions
- Conference: Big East Conference
- Record: 22–2–2 (9–1–1 Big East)
- Head coach: Dave Masur (6th season)
- Home stadium: Belson Stadium

The 1996 St. John's Red Storm men's soccer team represented St. John's University during the 1996 NCAA Division I men's soccer season and the 1996 Big East Conference men's soccer season. The Red Storm play their home games at Belson Stadium as a member of the Big East Conference. They were led by head coach Scott Jackson, in his fifth year as head coach.

== Regular season ==
=== Results ===
Date Time, TV	Rank^{#}	Opponent^{#}	Result	Record	Site City, State
Regular season
August 31*		Fordham; Rivalry	W 5–3	1–0–0	Belson Stadium; Queens, NY
September 1*		Hartwick; St. John's Umbro Classic	W 5–0	2–0–0	Belson Stadium; Queens, NY
September 7		at Notre Dame	T 2–2 ^{2OT}	2–0–1 (0–0–1)	Moose Krause Stadium; South Bend, IN
September 14		UConn	W 2–0	3–0–1 (1–0–1)	Belson Stadium; Queens, NY
September 20		at Georgetown	W 2–1	4–0–1 (2–0–1)	Shaw Field; Washington, DC
September 22		at West Virginia	W 3–1	5–0–1 (3–0–1)	Mountaineer Soccer Complex; Morgantown, WV
September 28		Pitt	W 4–2 ^{OT}	6–0–1 (4–0–1)	Belson Stadium; Queens, NY
October 1		at Villanova	W 7–0	7–0–1 (5–0–1)	Zimmerman Field; Philadelphia, PA
October 4		vs. Fresno State; Rutgers Met-Life Classic	W 3–1	8–0–1	Yurcak Field; Piscataway, NJ
October 6		vs. UNLV; Rutgers Met-Life Classic	W 7–0	9–0–1	Yurcak Field; Piscataway, NJ
October 12		at Syracuse	L 0–2	9–1–1 (5–1–1)	SU Soccer Stadium; Syracuse, NY
October 15		Seton Hall	W 2–0	10–1–1 (6–1–1)	Belson Stadium; Queens, NY
October 18		Providence	W 4–0	11–1–1 (7–1–1)	Belson Stadium; Queens, NY
