= 2019 Big East Conference men's soccer tournament =

- Classification: Division I
- Teams: 6
- Quarterfinals site: Higher seeds
- Semifinals site: Higher seeds
- Champions: Georgetown (4th title)
- Winning coach: Brian Wiese (4th title)
- MVP: Dylan Nealis (Georgetown)
- Broadcast: BEDN, FSG, FS2

2019 Big East Conference men's soccer standings
	Conf.					Overall
Team	W		L		T	W		L		T
No. 1 Georgetown ‡	7	–	0	–	2	18	–	1	–	4
No. 12 St. John's +	6	–	2	–	1	15	–	5	–	1
No. 14 Providence +	6	–	3	–	0	16	–	7	–	0
Creighton	4	–	4	–	1	8	–	7	–	2
Butler +	4	–	4	–	1	11	–	7	–	2
Marquette	4	–	5	–	0	8	–	9	–	1
Seton Hall	3	–	5	–	1	6	–	9	–	1
Xavier	3	–	6	–	0	8	–	8	–	1
Villanova	2	–	6	–	1	9	–	8	–	1
DePaul	1	–	5	–	3	5	–	9	–	3
‡ – 2019 Big East Tournament champion + – Invited to the 2019 NCAA tournament; As of 17 December 2019; Rankings from United Soccer Coaches

The 2019 Big East men's soccer tournament, was the sixth men's soccer tournament of the current Big East Conference, formed in July 2013 after the original Big East Conference split into two leagues along football lines. It was the 25th Big East tournament, taking into account its history as the first conference.

Georgetown, the two-time defending champions, successfully three-peated, and won their third consecutive Big East Tournament title, defeating Providence 3–1 in the final. Georgetown would also go on to win their first NCAA Tournament championship in program history. In addition, three teams (Butler, Providence, and St. John's) earned at-large bids into the NCAA Tournament, giving the Big East the most tournament bids since 2014.

Future MLS player, Dylan Nealis won the Offensive MVP Award. Jack Beer won the Defensive MVP award.

== Seeds ==
Seed	School	Conference	Tiebreaker
1	Georgetown	7–0–2	
2	St. John's	6–2–1	
3	Providence	6–3–0	
4	Creighton	4–4–1	1–0 vs. Butler
5	Butler	4–4–1	0–1 vs. Creighton
6	Marquette	4–5–0	

== Bracket ==
First Round; November 9
4	Creighton	0
5	Butler	1
3	Providence	1
6	Marquette	0

Semifinals; November 15
1	Georgetown	2(4)
5	Butler	2(3)
2	St. John's	1
3	Providence	2

Championship; November 17
1	Georgetown	3
3	Providence	1

== Results ==
=== First round ===
November 9
12:00 p.m. EDT

No. 3 Providence	3–0	No. 6 Marquette
Wolf 29'; Davock 67'; Lima 79'	Report

Anderson Stadium, Providence
Attendance: 617
Referee: Sergio Gonzalez

November 9
8:00 p.m. EDT

No. 4 Creighton	0–1	No. 5 Butler
	Report	Cabrera, Jr. 84'

Morrison Stadium, Omaha
Attendance: 1,928
Referee: Mark Buda

=== Semifinals ===
November 13
1:00 p.m. EDT

No. 1 Georgetown	2–2 (a.e.t.)	No. 5 Butler
Zawadzki 3'; Achara 51' (pen.)	Report	Lehtinen 7'; Guhl 70'
Penalties
Achara (penalty scored); Riviere (penalty scored); Dodson (penalty scored); Beer (penalty missed); Polvara (penalty scored)	4–3	(penalty scored) Cabrera Jr.; (penalty scored) Bulger; (penalty scored) DeBolt; (penalty missed) Timmer; (penalty missed) Lehtinen

Shaw Field, Washington, D.C.
Attendance: 177
Referee: Sergi Gonzalez

November 13
6:00 p.m. EDT

No. 2 St. John's	1–2	No. 3 Providence
Oluwaseyi 14'	Report	Lima 50'; Smith 87'

Belson Stadium, New York City
Attendance: 502
Referee: Mike Stutt

=== Final ===
November 17, 2019
12:00 p.m. EST

No. 1 Georgetown	3–1	No. 3 Providence
Polvara 56'; Beer 73'; Dodson 74'	Report	Mendonca 14'

Shaw Field, Washington, D.C.
Attendance: 1,031
Referee: John McCloskey

== Statistics ==
=== Goals ===
Rank	Player	College	Goals
1	(Colombia) Wilmer Cabrera Jr.	Butler	1
1	(United States) Trevor Davock	Providence	1
1	(Portugal) Paulo Lima	Providence	1
1	(Denmark) Esben Wolf	Providence	1

=== Assists ===
Rank	Player	College	Assists
1	(United States) Trevor Davock	Providence	1
1	(United States) Danny Griffin	Providence	1
1	(Portugal) João Serrano	Providence	1
1	(Denmark) Esben Wolf	Providence	1

== All Tournament Team ==
- Tournament Offensive MVP: Dylan Nealis, Georgetown
- Tournament Defensive MVP: Jack Beer, Geogetown

All-Tournament team:

- Brandon Guhl, Butler
- Rhys Myers, Butler
- Tani Oluwaseyi, St. John's
- Rafael Bustamante, St. John's
- Paulo Lima, Providence
- Esben Wolf, Providence

- Tiago Mendonca, Providence
- Sean Zawadzki, Georgetown
- Dante Polvara, Georgetown
- Dylan Nealis, Georgetown
- Jack Beer, Georgetown
