= 2019 Butler Bulldogs men's soccer team =

American college soccer season

2019 Butler Bulldogs men's soccer

NCAA Tournament, First Round
- Conference: Big East Conference
- Record: 11–7–2 (4–4–1 Big East)
- Head coach: Paul Snape (9th season)
- Assistant coaches: Adam Bruh (9th season); Jason Perry (8th season)
- Home stadium: Bud and Jackie Sellick Bowl

2019 Big East Conference men's soccer standings
	Conf.					Overall
Team	W		L		T	W		L		T
No. 1 Georgetown ‡	7	–	0	–	2	18	–	1	–	4
No. 12 St. John's +	6	–	2	–	1	15	–	5	–	1
No. 14 Providence +	6	–	3	–	0	16	–	7	–	0
Creighton	4	–	4	–	1	8	–	7	–	2
Butler +	4	–	4	–	1	11	–	7	–	2
Marquette	4	–	5	–	0	8	–	9	–	1
Seton Hall	3	–	5	–	1	6	–	9	–	1
Xavier	3	–	6	–	0	8	–	8	–	1
Villanova	2	–	6	–	1	9	–	8	–	1
DePaul	1	–	5	–	3	5	–	9	–	3
‡ – 2019 Big East Tournament champion + – Invited to the 2019 NCAA tournament; As of 17 December 2019; Rankings from United Soccer Coaches

The 2019 Butler Bulldogs men's soccer team represented Butler University during the 2019 NCAA Division I men's soccer season and the 2019 Big East Conference men's soccer season. The regular season began on August 30 and concluded on November 6. It was the program's 31st season fielding a men's varsity soccer team, and their 7th season in the Big East Conference. The 2019 season was Paul Snape's ninth year as head coach for the program.

== Roster ==
As of December 26, 2019

Note: Flags indicate national team as defined under FIFA eligibility rules; some limited exceptions apply. Players may hold more than one non-FIFA nationality.

No.	Pos.	Nation	Player
1	GK	(Italy) ITA	Gabriel Gjergji
2	MF	(United States) USA	Jack Streberger
3	DF	(United States) USA	Perrin Barnes
4	MF	(United States) USA	Derek Sutton
5	MF	(United States) USA	Jared Timmer
6	DF	(Japan) JPN	Louie Bulger
7	DF	(Finland) FIN	Alex Lehtinen
8	MF	(England) ENG	Jack Haywood
9	FW	(Colombia) COL	Wilmer Cabrera, Jr.
10	FW	(United States) USA	Hemi Nasser
11	FW	(United States) USA	Brandon Guhl
12	DF	(United States) USA	Griffin DeBolt
13	MF	(United States) USA	Logan Lee
14	MF	(United States) USA	Eric Hollenkamp
15	DF	(United States) USA	Joel Harvey
16	DF	(United States) USA	Kenzith Andrew

No.	Pos.	Nation	Player
17	FW	(United States) USA	Jack Woods
18	MF	(Spain) ESP	Usman Gil Ivern
19	FW	(United States) USA	Ethan King
20	MF	(United States) USA	Tommy Visser
21	DF	(United States) USA	Justin Savona
22	DF	(United States) USA	DJ Hooks
23	FW	(United States) USA	Maurice Thompson III
24	DF	(United States) USA	Brendan Hicks
25	DF	(England) ENG	Rhys Myers
26	FW	(United States) USA	Kyle Hagerman
27	MF	(United States) USA	Michael Cohen
28	DF	(United States) USA	Graham Rieg
30	GK	(United States) USA	Caleb Norris
32	GK	(United States) USA	P.J. Garcia
35	GK	(United States) USA	Owen Ranck

== Schedule ==
Date Time, TV	Rank^{#}	Opponent^{#}	Result	Record	Site (Attendance) City, State
Non-conference regular season
August 30*; 7:00 p.m.		Western Michigan	W 2–1	1–0–0	Sellick Bowl (567); Indianapolis, IN
September 2*; 7:00 p.m.		Evansville	W 2–0	2–0–0	Sellick Bowl (447); Indianapolis, IN
September 6*; 7:00 p.m.		at Marshall	L 1–2	2–1–0	Veterans Memorial Soccer Complex (608); Huntington, WV
September 12*; 7:30 p.m.		Wisconsin	W 1–0	3–1–0	Sellick Bowl (587); Indianapolis, IN
September 17*; 8:00 p.m., ESPN3		at SIU Edwardsville	L 1–2 ^{2OT}	3–2–0	Ralph Korte Stadium (200); Edwardsville, IL
Big East regular season
September 20; 7:00 p.m., BEDN		No. 3 Georgetown	L 0–3	3–3–0 (0–1–0)	Sellick Bowl (1,038); Indianapolis, IN
September 24*; 7:00 p.m.		No. 5 Indiana	W 2–1	4–3–0	Sellick Bowl (4,312); Indianapolis, IN
September 28; 7:00 p.m.		No. 9 St. John's	L 0–1	4–4–0 (0–2–0)	Sellick Bowl (527); Indianapolis, IN
October 4; 7:00 p.m., BEDN		at Providence	W 3–1	5–4–0 (1–2–0)	Anderson Stadium (635); Providence, RI
October 8*; 7:00 p.m.		Akron	W 1–0 ^{2OT}	6–4–0	Sellick Bowl (502); Indianapolis, IN
October 12; 7:00 p.m.		DePaul	T 2–2 ^{2OT}	6–4–1 (1–2–1)	Sellick Bowl (652); Indianapolis, IN
October 16*; 4:00 p.m.		at Lipscomb	W 2–1 ^{OT}	7–4–1	Lipscomb Soccer Complex; Nashville, TN
October 19; 1:00 p.m., BEDN		at Seton Hall	W 4–0	8–4–1 (2–2–1)	Owen T. Carroll Field (429); South Orange, NJ
October 23; 8:00 p.m., BEDN		at Marquette	L 2–3	8–5–1 (2–3–1)	Valley Fields (346); Milwaukee, WI
October 27; 1:00 p.m.		Villanova	W 1–0 ^{2OT}	9–5–1 (3–3–1)	Varsity Field (519); Indianapolis, IN
November 2; 8:00 p.m., BEDN		at Creighton	L 0–1 ^{2OT}	9–6–1 (3–4–1)	Morrison Stadium (1,627); Omaha, NE
November 6; 2:00 p.m., BEDN		Xavier	W 2–1	10–6–1 (4–4–1)	Sellick Bowl (377); Indianapolis, IN
Big East Tournament
November 9; 8:00 p.m., BEDN	(5)	at (4) Creighton; Quarterfinals	W 1–0	11–6–1	Morrison Stadium (1,928); Omaha, NE
November 13; 1:00 p.m., BEDN	(5)	at (1) No. 3 Georgetown; Semifinals	T 1–0 (3–4 PKs) ^{2OT}	11–6–2	Shaw Field (177); Washington, D.C.
NCAA Tournament
November 21; 6:00 p.m., BEDN		West Virginia; First Round	L 1–5	11–7–2	Sellick Bowl (312); Indianapolis, IN
*Non-conference game. ^{#}Rankings from United Soccer Coaches. (#) Tournament seedings in parentheses. All times are in Eastern Time.
