= Derek Dodson =

American soccer player (born 1998)

Personal information
- Full name: Derek Dodson
- Date of birth: November 3, 1998 (age 28)
- Place of birth: Aurora, Illinois, US
- Height: 6 ft 0 in (1.83 m)
- Positions: Wing-back; forward

Youth career
- 2012–2016: Sockers FC

College career
Years	Team	Apps	(Gls)
2017–2021	Georgetown Hoyas	72	(32)

Senior career*
Years	Team	Apps	(Gls)
2018	North County United	6	(2)
2021	Orlando City	0	(0)
2021	→ Hartford Athletic (loan)	22	(5)
2022	Memphis 901	28	(3)
2023	Charleston Battery	34	(2)
2024	Minnesota United	0	(0)
2024	Minnesota United 2	5	(0)
2024	→ Birmingham Legion (loan)	23	(1)
2025	D.C. United	14	(0)
- * Club domestic league appearances and goals as of October 24, 2025

Derek Dodson (born November 3, 1998) is an American professional soccer player who plays as a wing-back.

== Early years ==
Dodson was born in Aurora, Illinois. Growing up he was a three-year starter and one-year captain during his five seasons with the Sockers FC academy. The club qualified for the playoffs in all five years and Dodson was named to the 2017 USSDA Central Conference Best XI.

=== Georgetown Hoyas ===
Dodson played college soccer at Georgetown University, scoring 32 goals in 72 appearances for the Georgetown Hoyas between 2017 and 2021.

He appeared in all 20 games as a freshman but was limited to seven starts. Despite this he led the Hoyas in scoring with 10 goals, including three game-winners, and was named Big East Freshman of the Year.

Having secured a starting role as a sophomore, Dodson was a two-time First Team All-Big East selection in 2018 and 2019 and also earned United Soccer Coaches All-America third team honors in 2019. During Georgetown's College Cup winning season in 2019, Dodson scored a career-high 11 goals as Georgetown won all three competitions they played in: defending the Big East regular season title, winning a third consecutive Big East tournament, and claiming the first National Championship in program history. Dodson scored an 81st minute go-ahead goal in the final before fellow future Orlando City draftee Daryl Dike equalized five minutes later to take the game into overtime with the scores level at 3–3. Georgetown ultimately won in a penalty shoot-out.

After the postponement of the 2020 fall season until spring 2021 due to the COVID-19 pandemic, Dodson elected to return as a senior despite having been drafted by Orlando City in January 2021. He made a further sevens appearances for the Hoyas until his departure for Orlando in April having helped the team top the conference spring series standings. He was named to the Big East All-Conference first team at the end of regular season awards.

While at college, Dodson appeared for Premier Development League side North County United in 2018, scoring two goals in six appearances.

== Club career ==
=== Orlando City ===
On January 21, 2021, Dodson was selected in the first round (8th overall) of the 2021 MLS SuperDraft by Orlando City. Orlando had traded $100,000 in general allocation money to Portland Timbers earlier in the day to acquire the pick. Dodson missed preseason camp, electing to return to Georgetown to play during the delayed college season, but was eventually signed by the team on April 28 to a one-year contract with three separate option years.

=== Hartford Athletic ===
Having not yet featured in a matchday squad for Orlando City, Dodson was loaned to USL Championship side Hartford Athletic on July 9, 2021. He made his professional debut the following day as a 42nd-minute substitute replacing Richie Schlentz against New York Red Bulls II and scored in the 86th minute as Hartford came from two goals down to tie 2–2 in stoppage time. He scored again three days later, the only goal in a 1–0 win over Tampa Bay Rowdies. He scored five goals in 22 appearances as Hartford finished fifth in the Atlantic Division. Dodson had his contract option declined by Orlando City at the end of the 2021 season.

=== Memphis 901 ===
On February 18, 2022, Dodson signed with USL Championship side Memphis 901 ahead of their upcoming 2022 season.

=== Charleston Battery ===
On December 15, 2022, it was announced Dodson had moved to USL Championship side Charleston Battery to reunite with recently appointed head coach Ben Pirmann, who had coached Memphis for the 2022 season. Dodson was a key figure in the Battery's Eastern Conference title and run to the 2023 USL Championship Final, recording three goals and five assists in 38 games across the regular season and playoffs. He became a free agent following Charleston's 2023 season.

=== Minnesota United ===
Dodson joined Major League Soccer club Minnesota United on January 15, 2024. He joined USL Championship side Birmingham Legion FC on a season-long loan from May 22, 2024.

=== D.C. United ===
In December 2024, D.C. United selected Dodson in Stage 2 of the Re-Entry Draft, and subsequently signed him on December 31 to one-year contract with an option for an additional year. On November 26, 2025, the team announced that they had declined his contract option.

== Personal life ==
Two of Dodson's older siblings also played college soccer. His brother, Ryan, played for the North Carolina Tar Heels (2011) and Denver Pioneers (2012–14). His sister, Kristen, played for the Auburn Tigers (2014–17).

== Career statistics ==
=== College ===
School	Season	Division	Apps	Goals
Georgetown Hoyas	2017	Div. I	20	10
Georgetown Hoyas	2018	Div. I	21	9
Georgetown Hoyas	2019	Div. I	24	11
Georgetown Hoyas	2020–21	Div. I	7	2
Career total			72	32

=== Club ===
As of May 10, 2025

Club	Season	League			National cup		Playoffs		Total	
Club	Season	Division	Apps	Goals	Apps	Goals	Apps	Goals	Apps	Goals
North County United	2018	PDL	6	2	—		—		6	2
Orlando City	2021	MLS	0	0	—		0	0	0	0
Hartford Athletic (loan)	2021	USL Championship	22	5	—		—		22	5
Memphis 901 FC	2022	USL Championship	7	1	1	0	—		8	1
Charleston Battery	2023	USL Championship	34	2	1	0	4	1	39	3
Minnesota United	2024	MLS	0	0	—		0	0	0	0
Minnesota United 2	2024	MLS Next Pro	5	0	1	0	0	0	6	0
Birmingham Legion (loan)	2024	USL Championship	23	1	—		0	0	23	1
D.C. United	2025	MLS	6	0	1	0	0	0	7	0
Career total			103	11	4	0	4	1	111	12

== Honors ==
Georgetown Hoyas

- Big East Conference regular season: 2018, 2019
- Big East Conference Tournament: 2017, 2018, 2019
- NCAA Division I Men's Soccer Tournament: 2019

Individual

- Big East Freshman of the Year: 2017
