= Rio Hope-Gund =

American soccer player (born 1999)

Personal information
- Date of birth: August 20, 1999 (age 27)
- Place of birth: New York City, US
- Height: 1.80 m (5 ft 11 in)
- Position: Defender

Team information
- Current team: Detroit City FC
- Number: 20

Youth career
- 2014–2017: New York SC

College career
Years	Team	Apps	(Gls)
2017–2021	Georgetown Hoyas	44	(2)

Senior career*
Years	Team	Apps	(Gls)
2019	Manhattan SC	14	(0)
2021	Orlando City	0	(0)
2022	Loudoun United	20	(0)
2023–2024	New York City II	33	(1)
2024	New York City FC	0	(0)
2025	Rhode Island FC	13	(0)
2026–	Detroit City FC	14	(1)
- * Club domestic league appearances and goals as of November 4, 2026

Rio Hope-Gund (born August 20, 1999) is an American professional soccer player who plays as a defender for USL Championship club Detroit City FC.

== Early career ==
=== Youth ===
Hope-Gund was a four-year starter and served as captain at Friends Seminary in Manhattan, helping his high school team to three-consecutive league wins and a state championship in 2016. He was also a four-year started with club side New York Soccer Club, helping the team to back-to-back NPL National Championships in 2015 and 2016.

=== College and amateur ===
Hope-Gund played college soccer at Georgetown University. After redshirting in 2017, he made 16 appearances for the Hoyas including four starts and scoring two goals as the team won both the Big East regular season title and Big East tournament in 2018. In 2019, he started in all 20 games as part of a defense that posted 13 shutouts. Georgetown won all three competitions they played in: defending the Big East regular season title, winning a third consecutive Big East tournament, and claiming the first National Championship in program history. After the postponement of the 2020 fall season until spring 2021 due to the COVID-19 pandemic, Hope-Gund elected to return despite having been drafted by Orlando City in January 2021. He made a further eight appearances for the Hoyas until his departure for Orlando in April having helped the team top the conference spring series standings. He was named Big East defender of the year and earned Big East All-Conference first team honors at the end of regular season awards. In total he made 44 appearances for the Hoyas, scoring two goals and tallying two assists.

While at college, Hope-Gund played with USL League Two side Manhattan SC during the 2019 season, starting every game for the club as the team finished third in the Northeast Division.

== Club career ==
On January 21, 2021, Hope-Gund was selected in the first round (19th overall) of the 2021 MLS SuperDraft by Orlando City. He missed preseason camp, electing to return to Georgetown to play during the delayed college spring season before eventually being signed by the team to a one-year contract with three option years on April 8, 2021. He spent the entire season with the team and was named as a substitute 17 times but never made an appearance and had his contract option declined at the end of the year.

On February 11, 2022, Hope-Gund was announced as a signing for USL Championship side Loudoun United ahead of their 2022 season. He made his professional debut on March 12, 2022, starting and captaining Loudoun to a 1–0 win against Indy Eleven.

After a season with New York City FC II in the MLS Next Pro in 2023, Hope-Gund signed with their MLS roster on March 1, 2024. He was released by NYCFC following their 2024 season.

On April 5, 2025, Hope-Gund signed a short-term deal with USL Championship side Rhode Island FC. At the end of the season, Rhode Island FC let Hope-Gund's contract expire.

On December 18, 2025, Hope-Gund joined fellow USL Championship club Detroit City FC on a one-year contract with an option to extend another year.

== Personal life ==
Hope-Gund's twin brother, Kofi, played soccer as a goalkeeper at Amherst College.

== Career statistics ==
=== Club ===
As of April 17, 2022

Club	Season	League			National cup		Playoffs		Total	
Club	Season	Division	Apps	Goals	Apps	Goals	Apps	Goals	Apps	Goals
Manhattan SC	2019	USL League Two	14	0	—		—		14	0
Orlando City	2021	Major League Soccer	0	0	—		0	0	0	0
Loudoun United	2022	USL Championship	6	0	0	0	—		6	0
Career total			20	0	0	0	0	0	20	0

== Honors ==
Georgetown Hoyas

- Big East Conference regular season: 2018, 2019
- Big East Conference Tournament: 2017, 2018, 2019
- NCAA Division I Men's Soccer Tournament: 2019

Individual

- Big East Defender of the Year: 2020–21
