= Paulo Lima (footballer, born 1998) =

Portuguese footballer

Personal information
- Full name: Paulo Jorge Barros Pimentel Lima
- Date of birth: June 5, 1998 (age 28)
- Place of birth: Lisbon, Portugal
- Height: 6 ft 1 in (1.85 m)
- Position: Midfielder

Team information
- Current team: VPS
- Number: 8

Youth career
- 2006–2013: Real
- 2003–2017: Sporting CP
- 2016–2017: → SG Sacavenense (loan)

College career
| Years | Team | Apps | (Gls) |
| 2018–2021 | Providence Friars | 50 | (13) |

Senior career*
| Years | Team | Apps | (Gls) |
| 2017–2018 | Sintrense | 17 | (2) |
| 2019 | Boston Bolts | 3 | (0) |
| 2022 | Houston Dynamo 2 | 18 | (0) |
| 2023 | Unirea Bascov | 0 | (0) |
| 2023–2024 | Sintrense | 13 | (0) |
| 2024 | Vitória Setúbal | 14 | (1) |
| 2024–2025 | São João de Ver | 26 | (0) |
| 2025–2026 | 1º Dezembro | 16 | (3) |
| 2026– | VPS | 30 | (1) |
- * Club domestic league appearances and goals as of 13 November 2026

Paulo Jorge Barros Pimentel Lima (born 5 June 1998) is a Portuguese footballer who currently plays for Finnish Veikkausliiga club VPS.

== Career ==
=== Early career ===
Lima played as part of the Real academy for six years and later with Sporting CP for four years. At Sporting, Lima won on a U-19 National Championship and a U-16 National Championship, as well as appearing on the bench a single time with Sporting CP B in 2016. After leaving Sporting, Lima played a season with Sintrense in the Campeonato de Portugal.

=== United States college and amateur ===
In 2018, Lima made the move to the United States to play college soccer at Providence College. Here he went on to make 50 appearances for the Friars, scoring 13 goals and tallying six assists. In 2019, he was named to the All-Big East second team and was named the team's Offensive Most Valuable Player, and in his junior and senior years Lima was named to the All-Big East first team.

While at college, Lima also played in the USL League Two with Boston Bolts, where he made three appearances.

=== Professional ===
On 11 January 2022, Lima was selected 32nd overall in the 2022 MLS SuperDraft by Houston Dynamo. On 19 February 2022, Lima signed professionally with Houston's MLS Next Pro side Houston Dynamo 2.
