= Daryl Dike =

American soccer player (born 2000)

- Dike with Orlando City in 2026

Personal information
- Full name: Daryl Enyinnaya Dike
- Date of birth: June 3, 2000 (age 26)
- Place of birth: Edmond, Oklahoma, U.S.
- Height: 6 ft 2 in (1.88 m)
- Position: Striker

Team information
- Current team: Orlando City
- Number: 9

Youth career
- 2013–2015: Oklahoma FC

College career
| Years | Team | Apps | (Gls) |
| 2018–2019 | Virginia Cavaliers | 36 | (15) |

Senior career*
| Years | Team | Apps | (Gls) |
| 2018 | OKC Energy U23 | 4 | (3) |
| 2020–2021 | Orlando City | 35 | (18) |
| 2021 | → Barnsley (loan) | 19 | (9) |
| 2022–2026 | West Bromwich Albion | 64 | (10) |
| 2026– | Orlando City | 15 | (2) |

International career^{‡}
| 2021–2023 | United States | 10 | (3) |
Medal record
Representing United States
| Winner | CONCACAF Gold Cup | 2021 |
- * Club domestic league appearances and goals as of 23:50, November 7, 2026 (UTC) ‡ National team caps and goals as of March 27, 2023

Daryl Enyinnaya Dike (born June 3, 2000) is an American professional soccer player who plays as a striker for Major League Soccer club Orlando City.

Dike played college soccer for the University of Virginia and was selected in the first round (5th overall) of the 2020 MLS SuperDraft by Orlando City after already having signed a Generation Adidas contract. Dike also won the 2021 CONCACAF Gold Cup with the United States national team.

== Early years ==
Born in Edmond, Oklahoma, Dike played soccer at Edmond North High School, captaining the side from his sophomore season onward. A three-time Oklahoma Offensive Player of the Year, he scored an Oklahoma 6A state record 70 goals and helped his team win a state championship. In 2018 he was named Gatorade Player of the Year for Oklahoma.

Dike played for OKC Energy U23 in the PDL during the 2018 season between high school and college soccer, making four appearances and scoring three goals.

=== Virginia Cavaliers ===
Ahead of the 2018 NCAA Division I men's soccer season, Dike signed a national letter of intent to play college soccer for the Virginia Cavaliers. Originally a reserve, Dike became a regular starter for the Cavaliers a month into the season. He made his college soccer debut on September 18, 2018, playing 34 minutes in a 2–0 victory against FIU. On September 21, 2018, Dike made his first start, playing 57 minutes in a 2–0 win at Syracuse. Dike scored his first collegiate goal on October 2, 2018, in a 2–1 victory against Wright State. He scored four more goals during the season before an injury sidelined him during the 2018 ACC Men's Soccer Tournament. Dike returned on November 18, 2018, for the NCAA tournament, where he recorded his first collegiate assist in a 2–0 victory against Furman. Dike finished the 2018 season with 13 appearances, five goals, and an assist. Dike was named to the ACC All-Freshman Team and the ACC Academic Honor Roll.

Dike started all 23 matches for Virginia during his sophomore year. On August 30, 2019, in the opening game of the 2019 season, Dike registered two assists in a 2–0 win against Pacific. Dike led the Cavaliers with goals and assists during the 2019 season, netting 10 goals and providing eight assists. He scored both of Virginia's two goals on December 13, 2019, in the College Cup semifinals against Wake Forest. On December 15, 2019, Dike scored the tying goal in the 2019 NCAA Division I Men's Soccer Championship Game against Georgetown to send the game to overtime, where Virginia ultimately lost in penalty kicks. Dike was named the NCAA Division I Men's Soccer Tournament Most Outstanding Player following the match, giving Dike his first national collegiate award. Additionally, Dike was named to the All-ACC Second Team.

== Professional career ==
=== Orlando City ===
==== Rookie season ====
On January 9, 2020, Dike was selected in the first round (5th overall) of the 2020 MLS SuperDraft by Orlando City having already signed a Generation Adidas contract. On July 25, 2020, he made his professional debut as an 75th-minute substitute for Tesho Akindele in a 1–0 victory over Montreal Impact during the MLS is Back Tournament round of 16. On August 22, Dike made his first start for the team in his first regular season MLS match and subsequently scored his first professional goal in a 3–2 defeat to Inter Miami. Four days later he scored his first career brace in a 3–1 win over Nashville SC. With three goals and two assists in five matches, Dike was named MLS Player of the Month for August 2020. In October, Dike was announced as #10 in the annual MLS 22 Under 22 list, the first Orlando player since Cyle Larin in 2017 to be included. With MLS electing to change the annual Rookie of the Year award to Young Player of the Year in 2020, Dike was the highest-ranked rookie but came third in the voting behind five-year pro Diego Rossi and second-year pro Brenden Aaronson.

==== Loan to Barnsley ====
On February 1, 2021, Dike joined EFL Championship club Barnsley on loan until the end of the 2020–21 season with a reported $20 million option to buy and 20% sell-on fee clause. He was only able to meet the criteria for a UK work permit because he had made his senior international debut the day before. He made his Barnsley debut on February 11, as a 59th-minute substitute for Victor Adeboyejo in a 1–0 FA Cup fifth round defeat to Premier League side Chelsea. He made his league debut three days later, starting and playing 56 minutes of a 2–0 win over Brentford. He scored his first goal for the club on February 24 in a 2–0 league win over Stoke City. With four goals in six appearances, Dike was named Barnsley's player of the month for March. He also won the club's goal of the month award for a thunderous strike in a 1–0 win over Birmingham City on March 6. The strike was later voted as the club's goal of the season. On April 21, Dike scored a bicycle kick in a 1–0 win over Huddersfield Town. The result moved Barnsley six points clear of Reading in the race for the final promotion play-off place with three games to go. On April 28, Dike was named the club's player of the month for the second consecutive time having scored four goals in six games including two game-winners. Having confirmed their playoff status, Barnsley came to an agreement with Orlando City on April 29 to prevent Dike from being recalled during the postseason. He started the semifinal first leg at home as Barnsley lost 1–0 before appearing as a halftime substitute during a 1–1 draw in the second leg. Dike's loan expired on May 31 with Orlando City announcing in a statement the following day that Barnsley had elected not to trigger the release clause.

==== 2021 season ====
Having missed the first part of the season while finishing his Barnsley loan before joining up with the United States national team, Dike eventually made his 2021 season debut for Orlando as a second-half substitute on June 19 in a 3–2 win over Toronto FC. He started the following game, scoring twice in a 5–0 victory against San Jose Earthquakes. He made a further two appearances before again leaving on international duty at the 2021 CONCACAF Gold Cup. He missed five games due to the tournament and returned with a shoulder injury and tendinitis, forcing him to miss a further five games including Orlando's continental debut in the 2021 Leagues Cup. With the team struggling to stay above the playoff line from early August, Dike started slow on his return to the side - scoring and assisting once (both in a 3–2 victory over Columbus Crew on September 4) in five games, of which the goal saw him awarded Goal of the Week. He eventually found form, scoring in three consecutive games for the second time in his pro career. The streak notably included a penalty as Dike took duties away from veteran Portugal international Nani who had failed to convert the previous game, Orlando's third miss on five attempts in 2021. In October, it was announced that Dike was ranked #2 behind only Ricardo Pepi on the annual MLS 22 Under 22, up from #10 on the previous year's list.

=== West Bromwich Albion ===
On January 1, 2022, Dike signed for West Bromwich Albion of the English EFL Championship on a four-and-a-half-year contract for an undisclosed fee. On January 16, Dike made his debut for West Bromwich Albion, coming on as a substitute in a 1–0 loss to Queen's Park Rangers. During his first start against Peterborough United, Dike sustained a hamstring injury which ruled him out for the remainder of the season. He scored his first goal for the club on December 12, 2022, in a 2–1 win against Sunderland.

During a league game against Stoke City on April 15, 2023, Dike suffered an Achilles tendon injury in his right leg which ruled him out for nine months.

On February 10, 2024, just over a month after his return, Dike suffered a left leg injury and was carted off during a 2–2 draw against Ipswich Town. Manager Carlos Corberan stated after the match that the injury was "similar" to the one Dike suffered in 2023. On February 12, it was confirmed that Dike has ruptured his left Achilles tendon, and would miss the remainder of 2024.

It would be an entire year before Dike played again for West Brom, making his return as a 77th-minute substitute against Millwall on February 15, 2025. He would start and score in his first league game in over two years on May 5, 2025, in a 5–3 win against Luton Town.

On May 15, 2026, the club announced he would be released at the end of the season when his contract expired.

=== Return to Orlando City ===
On July 17, 2026, Dike returned to Orlando City, signing a contract through the 2027 Major League Soccer season with a team option for the following season. Upon signing, Dike said that he felt "welcomed" and that "everyone has been incredibly supportive". Dike made his return on August 5 as a second half substitute for Justin Ellis in a 2–1 win over Monterrey in the Leagues Cup. On August 12, Dike scored his first goal for Orlando City, their first in a 2–2 draw against Atlético de San Luis. Orlando City would win the game 5–3 on penalties, but would be eliminated from the Leagues Cup. Dike scored his first regular season goal for Orlando City when he opened the scoring in a 3–3 draw with Minnesota United on August 29.

== International career ==
In November 2020, Dike was called up to the United States national team for the first time for a friendly against El Salvador but did not appear after picking up an injury in training. He made his debut for the United States on January 31, 2021, as a 65th-minute substitute for Paul Arriola in a 7–0 friendly win over Trinidad and Tobago. In May 2021, Dike was called into training camp for the 2021 CONCACAF Nations League Finals but did not make the final squad. He scored his first international goal on June 9, 2021, in a 4–0 friendly win over Costa Rica at Rio Tinto Stadium. In July 2021, Dike was named to the final 23-player roster for the 2021 CONCACAF Gold Cup. On July 15, Dike scored his first competitive goals when he scored a brace during a 6–1 group stage win over Martinique.

== Personal life ==
The youngest of five siblings, Dike's eldest brother, Bright Dike, was also a first round MLS Superdraft pick in 2010 and has played for the Nigerian national team. His sister, Courtney, was capped by Nigeria and made two appearances at the 2015 FIFA Women's World Cup. He is the cousin of Nigeria international striker Emmanuel Emenike.

== Career statistics ==
=== Club ===
As of match played November 19, 2026

Appearances and goals by club, season and competition
| Club | Season | League | | | National cup (Note: Includes FA Cup and U.S. Open Cup) | | League cup (Note: Includes MLS Cup playoffs and EFL Cup) | | Other | | Total | |
| Club | Season | Division | Apps | Goals | Apps | Goals | Apps | Goals | Apps | Goals | Apps | Goals |
|---|---|---|---|---|---|---|---|---|---|---|---|---|
| Orlando City | 2020 | Major League Soccer | 17 | 8 | — | | 2 | 0 | 3 (Note: Appearances in MLS is Back Tournament knockout stage) | 0 | 22 | 8 |
| Orlando City | 2021 | Major League Soccer | 18 | 10 | — | | 1 | 1 | — | | 19 | 11 |
| Orlando City | Total | | 35 | 18 | — | | 3 | 1 | 3 | 0 | 41 | 19 |
| Barnsley (loan) | 2020–21 | EFL Championship | 19 | 9 | 1 | 0 | 0 | 0 | 2 (Note: Appearances in Championship play-offs) | 0 | 22 | 9 |
| West Bromwich Albion | 2021–22 | EFL Championship | 2 | 0 | 0 | 0 | 0 | 0 | — | | 2 | 0 |
| West Bromwich Albion | 2022–23 | EFL Championship | 23 | 7 | 2 | 0 | 0 | 0 | — | | 25 | 7 |
| West Bromwich Albion | 2023–24 | EFL Championship | 4 | 0 | 1 | 1 | 0 | 0 | — | | 5 | 1 |
| West Bromwich Albion | 2024–25 | EFL Championship | 11 | 1 | 0 | 0 | 0 | 0 | — | | 11 | 1 |
| West Bromwich Albion | 2025–26 | EFL Championship | 24 | 2 | 1 | 0 | 0 | 0 | — | | 25 | 2 |
| West Bromwich Albion | Total | | 64 | 10 | 4 | 1 | 0 | 0 | 0 | 0 | 68 | 11 |
| Orlando City | 2026 | Major League Soccer | 15 | 2 | 1 | 0 | — | | 4 (Note: Three appearances in Leagues Cup, one appearance in MLS Cup playoffs) | 1 | 20 | 3 |
| Career total | | | 133 | 39 | 6 | 1 | 3 | 1 | 9 | 1 | 151 | 42 |

=== International ===
As of match played March 27, 2023

Appearances and goals by national team and year
| National team | Year | Apps | Goals |
|---|---|---|---|
| United States | 2021 | 8 | 3 |
| United States | 2023 | 2 | 0 |
| Total | | 10 | 3 |

As of match played July 15, 2021
Scores and results list United States's goal tally first, score column indicates score after each Dike goal.

List of international goals scored by Daryl Dike
| No. | Date | Venue | Cap | Opponent | Score | Result | Competition |
|---|---|---|---|---|---|---|---|
| 1 | June 9, 2021 | Rio Tinto Stadium, Sandy, United States | 3 | Costa Rica | 2–0 | 4–0 | Friendly |
| 2 | July 15, 2021 | Children's Mercy Park, Kansas City, United States | 5 | Martinique | 1–0 | 6–1 | 2021 CONCACAF Gold Cup |
| 3 | July 15, 2021 | Children's Mercy Park, Kansas City, United States | 5 | Martinique | 4–0 | 6–1 | 2021 CONCACAF Gold Cup |

== Honors ==
Virginia Cavaliers

- ACC regular season: 2019
- ACC Men's Soccer Tournament: 2019
- NCAA Division I Men's Soccer Tournament runner-up: 2019

United States

- CONCACAF Gold Cup: 2021

Individual

- NCAA Division I Men's Soccer Tournament Most Outstanding Player: 2019
- MLS Player of the Month: August 2020
- EFL Championship Fans Player of the Month: April 2021
