= Giannis Nikopolidis =

Greek association football player (born 2000)

Personal information
- Full name: Ioannis Nikopolidis
- Date of birth: 8 December 2000 (age 25)
- Place of birth: Athens, Greece
- Height: 1.88 m (6 ft 2 in)
- Position: Goalkeeper

Team information
- Current team: A.E. Kifisia

Youth career
- –2017: Olympiacos Piraeus

College career
Years	Team	Apps	(Gls)
2018–2021	Georgetown Hoyas	52	(0)

Senior career*
Years	Team	Apps	(Gls)
2022	New York Red Bulls II	15	(0)
2023	Lamia	0	(0)
2023–	A.E. Kifisia	1	(0)
2025–2026	→ Iraklis (loan)	5	(0)

International career
2016–2017	Greece U17	3	(0)
2018–2019	Greece U19	5	(0)
- * Club domestic league appearances and goals as of December 21, 2025

Giannis Nikopolidis (Greek: Γιάννης Νικοπολίδης; born 8 December 2000) is a Greek professional association football player who plays as a goalkeeper for Super League club A.E. Kifisia.

== Professional career ==
=== New York Red Bulls II ===
On 11 January 2022, Nikopolidis was drafted by the New York Red Bulls II with the 71st pick in the 2022 MLS SuperDraft. Nikopolidis, officially signed his first contract with the club on 2 March. Nikopolidis made his professional debut on 2 April 2022, during a 3–2 loss to FC Tulsa. Nikopolidis earned his first professional shutout on 15 July 2022, during a 1–0 win over Indy Eleven.

=== Lamia ===
Nikopolidis signed with Greek Super League side Lamia in January 2023. He was named to the bench for Lamia's 2–1 Greek Football Cup quarterfinal win vs. Apollon Paralimnio.

== Personal life ==
Nikopolidis is the son of former Greece national team goalkeeper and UEFA Euro 2004 champion, Antonios Nikopolidis.
