= David Masur =

American soccer player-coach

Dave Masur
Personal information
- Full name: Dr. David Masur
- Date of birth: January 10, 1962 (age 64)
- Place of birth: Maplewood, New Jersey, U.S.
- Height: 5 ft 9 in (1.75 m)
- Position: Midfielder

Youth career
- 1977–1980: Columbia High School
- 1981–1984: Rutgers Scarlet Knights

Senior career*
Years	Team	Apps	(Gls)
1985–1986	Chicago Sting (indoor)	22	(0)
1987–1988	Toledo Pride (indoor)		
1988–1989	New Jersey Eagles		
1990–1991	Penn-Jersey Spirit		
1994–2000	North Jersey Imperials		

Managerial career
- 1984–1987: Rutgers Scarlet Knights (assistant)
- 1987–1990: Montclair State
- 1991–: St. John's Red Storm
- * Club domestic league appearances and goals

David Masur (born January 10, 1962) is an American retired soccer midfielder who played professionally in the Major Indoor Soccer League, American Professional Soccer League and USISL. He is the head coach of the St. John's University men's soccer team. He was the 1996 NCAA Division I Coach of the Year and led the Red Storm to the 1996 NCAA national championship.

== Player ==
=== Youth ===
Masur graduated from Columbia High School in 1980. He was a multi-sport athlete at Columbia, playing on the basketball and lacrosse team. He had his greatest success as a three-year starter on the Columbia soccer team, winning the Group IV state championship his junior and senior seasons. He was a Parade All-American and New Jersey State Player of the Year. In May 2006, Masur was elected to the Columbia High School Hall of Fame. In 1979, the New York Cosmos drafted Masur out of high school, but he elected to attend Rutgers University where he played on the men's soccer team from 1981 to 1984. He was the team's 1982 and 1983 MVP, and served as team captain from 1982 to 1984. Masur made the All-Regional team as a sweeper from 1982 to 1984. He is the only Scarlet Knight to win back-to-back All-American honors: 1983 First Team and 1984 Third Team All American. Masur became the third soccer player to be inducted into the Rutgers Olympic Sports Hall of Fame. In 1989, Rutgers retired his jersey.

=== Professional ===
In June 1985, the Chicago Sting selected Masur in the second round of the Major Indoor Soccer League draft. He played one season with Chicago before being released during the 1986 off season. In October 1986, Masur signed with the expansion Toledo Pride in the American Indoor Soccer Association. The Pride folded at the end of the season. In August 1987, he became head coach of Montclair State. In March 1988 Masur returned to playing when he signed with the New Jersey Eagles of the American Soccer League. He played both the 1988 and 1989 seasons with the Eagles. In 1990, Masur moved to the Penn-Jersey Spirit of the American Professional Soccer League. He played for the Spirit again in 1991. From 1994 to 2000, he played for the North Jersey Imperials in the USISL.

== Coach ==
Masur's career coaching record is 438–189–99. 4th most winningest active coach in Division 1 college soccer. In 1984, Masur became an assistant coach with Rutgers, a position he held for two seasons. In August 1987, he became the head coach at Montclair State which had just finished its season at 4–10. Masur turned the program around and over four seasons compiled a 53–21–6 record, taking the team to three NCAA post-season tournaments. On January 30, 1991, he became the head coach of the St. John's University men's soccer team. Since then, St. John's won the 1996 NCAA Men's Division I Soccer Championship, made four appearances in the NCAA College Cup (1996, 2001, 2003 and 2008) and reached twenty two NCAA post-season tournaments, including fifteen straight from 1992 to 2006. The Red Storm also reached ten consecutive NCAA Tournament Rounds of sixteen from 1996 to 2005. Under Masur, the Red Storm has also won seven Big East Tournament titles, six regular season crowns and has qualified for eighteen consecutive Big East tournaments. On a personal level, Masur is a two-time NSCAA Coach of the Year. Soccer America named him Coach of the Year in 2001. Masur is also a six-time Northeast Region Coach of the Year (1991, 1993, 1996, 2001, 2003 and 2008), Three-time Big East Coach of the Year (1991, 1993, 2008), New Jersey Athletic Conference Coach of the Year (1989), and New Jersey College Coach of the Year (1989). Masur was inducted into the St. John's Athletics Hall of Fame in May 2004. Masur also coaches youth soccer.

== Personal life ==
Masur received his master's degree from Montclair State and his Doctorate in Education Administration and Supervision and Leadership from St. John's.

He is married to Shannon Masur and they have 4 children: Samantha, Jessica, Christopher, and Sydney.
