= Dante Polvara =

American soccer player (born 2000)

Personal information
- Date of birth: June 21, 2000 (age 26)
- Place of birth: Pleasantville, New York, United States
- Position: Midfielder

Team information
- Current team: St. Louis City SC
- Number: 21

Youth career
- 2016–2019: New York City FC

College career
Years	Team	Apps	(Gls)
2019–2021	Georgetown Hoyas	56	(16)

Senior career*
Years	Team	Apps	(Gls)
2022–2026	Aberdeen	65	(3)
2023	→ Charleston Battery (loan)	18	(1)
2026–	St. Louis City	9	(0)
- * Club domestic league appearances and goals as of 17:00, 21 February 2026 (CTS)

Dante Polvara (born June 21, 2000) is an American professional soccer player who plays as a midfielder for Major League Soccer club St. Louis City SC. He played college soccer for Georgetown University. Polvara was the 2021 recipient of the Hermann Trophy awarded to the best college soccer player in the United States.

== Career ==
=== Youth and college ===
Polvara played for the New York City FC academy during his high school years, and was a regular starter for four years in the academy. Polvara helped NYCFC win back-to-back US Soccer Development Academy National Championships, captaining the team for their second championship. While with NYCFC Academy, Polvara played three years of high school soccer for the Brunswick School in Connecticut, where he served as captain for the program his junior year.

On December 17, 2018, Polvara signed a National Letter of Intent to play collegiately for Georgetown University in Washington, D.C. Polvara made his college debut on August 30, 2019, against Syracuse University, where he also scored his first collegiate goal. In his second match on September 2, 2019, he scored again, against Temple University. Polvara concluded his freshman campaign with 24 appearances, scoring four goals and having two assists. Polvara was also named to the 2019 Big East Conference Men's Soccer Tournament All-Tournament Team.

During his second year, Polvara became a starter for the Hoyas, making 14 appearances for the program. He had his first multi-goal game on February 27, 2021, against Villanova University. He finished the 2020 season with eight goals, and was named the Big East Midfielder of the Year.

Polvara replicated his success from 2020 in the 2021 season, making 22 appearances, scoring seven times, including three goals in the 2021 NCAA Division I Men's Soccer Tournament. His success earned him the Big East Midfielder of the Year Award and First-Team All-Conference. Additionally, Polvara earned the Hermann Trophy, which is an annual award given to the top college soccer player in the country. Polvara concurrently won the TopDrawerSoccer.com Men's National Player of the Year Award.

=== Aberdeen ===
Polvara decided to forgo his final year of college eligibility and opted to sign a professional contract after the 2021 NCAA Division I men's soccer season. On January 9, 2022, Polvara signed a two-and-a-half-year deal with Scottish Premiership side, Aberdeen. He reportedly turned down a Homegrown contract to play with New York City FC in Major League Soccer.

On March 6, 2022, Polvara made his professional debut coming on in the 84th minute in a 0–1 loss at Rangers. He made his first start for the club in a league game against Hibernian in May 2022.

On March 8, 2023, Polvara was loaned to USL Championship side Charleston Battery for their 2023 season. He returned to Aberdeen in July 2023.

On September 21, 2023, Polvara scored his first goal for the club in the UEFA Europa Conference League against Eintracht Frankfurt and again in the same competition against PAOK. Polvara scored his first domestic league goal in 4–0 win against Hibernian in May 2024. On May 24, 2025, he won the Scottish Cup, converting a penalty in the shootout following a 1–1 draw.

== Career statistics ==
As of match played January 30, 2026

Appearances and goals by club, season and competition
Club	Season	League			National cup (Note: Includes Scottish Cup, U.S. Open Cup)		League cup (Note: Includes Scottish League Cup)		Continental		Total	
Club	Season	Division	Apps	Goals	Apps	Goals	Apps	Goals	Apps	Goals	Apps	Goals
Aberdeen	2021–22	Scottish Premiership	5	0	0	0	0	0	0	0	5	0
Aberdeen	2022–23	Scottish Premiership	3	0	0	0	3	0	0	0	6	0
Aberdeen	2023–24	Scottish Premiership	28	2	3	0	3	0	6 (Note: One appearance in UEFA Europa League, five appearances and two goals in UEFA Europa Conference League)	2	40	4
Aberdeen	2024–25	Scottish Premiership	11	0	4	0	0	0	–		15	0
Aberdeen	2025–26	Scottish Premiership	2	0	0	0	0	0	1 (Note: Appearance in UEFA Europa League)	1	3	1
Aberdeen	Total		49	2	7	0	6	0	7	3	69	5
Charleston Battery (loan)	2023	USL Championship	18	1	3	0	–		–		21	1
St. Louis City SC	2026	Major League Soccer	0	0	0	0	–		–		0	0
Career total			67	3	10	0	6	0	7	3	90	6

== Honors ==
Aberdeen

- Scottish Cup: 2024–25
