= Chapey Field at Anderson Stadium =

Stadium at Providence College in Rhode Island, US

Coordinates: 41.84531°N 71.43354°W

Chapey Field
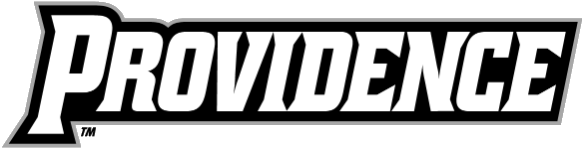
- Interactive map of Chapey Field
- Full name: Chapey Field at Anderson Stadium
- Address: Providence, RI; United States
- Owner: Providence College
- Operator: Providence Athletics
- Capacity: 3,000 (soccer / lacrosse)
- Type: Stadium
- Surface: Artificial turf
- Current use: soccer Lacrosse

Construction
- Groundbreaking: Spring 2015
- Opened: 2016; 10 years ago
- Cost: $3 million
- Architect: SMMA

Tenants
- Providence Friars (NCAA) teams: men's and women's soccer (2016–present); men's lacrosse (2016–present)

Website
- friars.com/chapey-field

Chapey Field at Anderson Stadium is the on-campus soccer and lacrosse stadium at Providence College in Providence, Rhode Island, United States. Completed in 2015, it is home to the college's men's and women's soccer teams and men's lacrosse team.

== History ==
Chapey Field at Anderson Stadium was built in 2015–2016 to suit the needs of the nationally prominent men's soccer program and the growing women's soccer and men's lacrosse programs, under the direction of president Rev. Brian Shanley, O.P and athletic director Bob Driscoll.

=== Athletic campus ===
This facility was constructed next to the schools state of the art men's ice hockey facility (renovated in 2013) as part of an initiative to provide the schools athletic teams with the facilities to meet the needs of the ever-growing ambitions and successes and consolidate the schools athletic facilities into one large athletic campus. The stadium completes the lower half of the athletic campus, which houses men's and women's ice hockey programs, men's and women's soccer, men's lacrosse and women's tennis. Anderson Stadium / Chapey Field was constructed on the former site of the women's softball stadium, student parking facility, and the college tennis facility. Prior to moving into Anderson, the soccer team had previously played on Glay Field (which has since been converted into the new state of the art home to the women's softball program and a new parking facility) and the lacrosse team had previously played on Lennon Family Field (which has since been converted into the home to the women's field hockey program).

=== Donations ===
This was another pivotal step part of the athletic departments broader initiative to further enhance the experience of student-athletes. With winning the 2015 NCAA Men's Hockey National Championship, 2014 NCAA Women's Cross Country National Championship, 2014 BIG EAST Men's Basketball Championship, reaching the 2015 NCAA Men's Soccer Final Four, and reaching back-to-back men's basketball NCAA Tournaments, the college's athletic and academic future was bright, bringing the pride and investment of the alumni base to drive the continued success. Projects that had already been completed to that point were the construction of Concannon Fitness Center and Lennon Family field, and renovations of Alumni Hall, Taylor Natatorium, Schneider Arena and the Dunkin' Donuts Center, and succeeded by the investment in the construction of the Friar Development Center.

==== Mike & Maura Chapey '86 ====
In April 2014, Providence College Athletics announced the largest gift from an individual who is not a member of the board of trustees in the history of Providence College Athletics. Mike and Maura Chapey, both PC graduates from the class of 1986, made the historic $1 million gift to support the construction of a state-of-the-art lacrosse and soccer complex. The new soccer and lacrosse field was named in honor of the Chapey family for their generous donation.

==== Karl & Kerry Anderson '88 ====
In December 2014, Providence College Athletics announced that board of trustees member Karl Anderson '88 and his wife, Kerry '88, have pledged $1.5 million to support the construction of a state-of-the-art soccer and lacrosse complex. This gift would, along with the Chapey families donation, fully enable Providence College to officially move forward with the construction of the facility. The new soccer and lacrosse complex was named in honor of the Anderson family for their generous donation. This was part of the athletic departments initiative to improve the experience the fans of Friar Athletics who will attend games at the new complex.
