= Dylan Nealis =

American soccer player (born 1998)

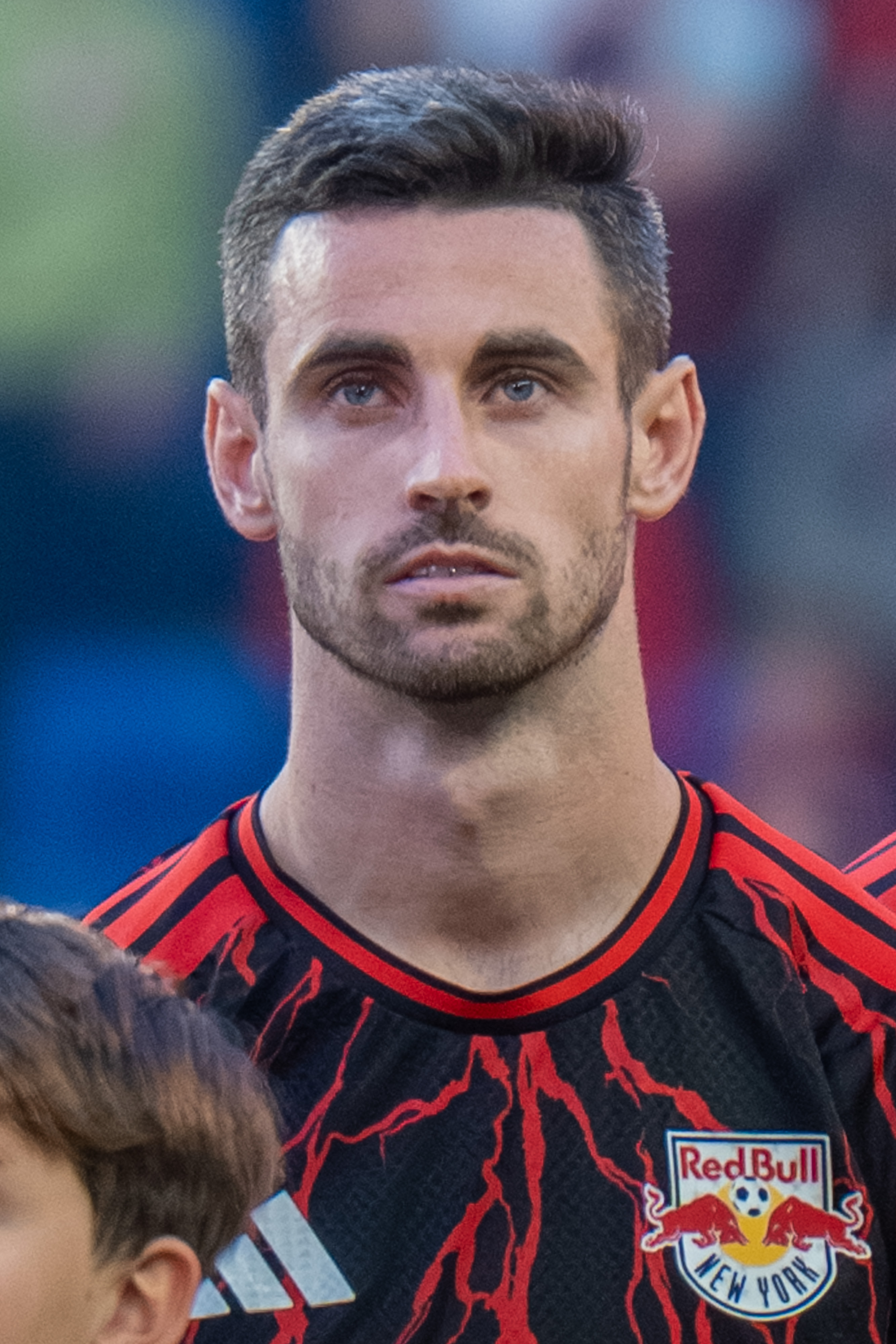
- Nealis with the New York Red Bulls in 2026

Personal information
- Full name: Dylan Nealis
- Date of birth: July 30, 1998 (age 28)
- Place of birth: Massapequa, New York, United States
- Height: 5 ft 11 in (1.81 m)
- Position: Right-back

Team information
- Current team: New York Red Bulls
- Number: 12

Youth career
- 2005–2016: Massapequa SC

College career
Years	Team	Apps	(Gls)
2016–2019	Georgetown Hoyas	78	(7)

Senior career*
Years	Team	Apps	(Gls)
2017–2019	Long Island Rough Riders	16	(0)
2020	Inter Miami	19	(0)
2021	Nashville SC	4	(0)
2021–	New York Red Bulls	124	(1)
- * Club domestic league appearances and goals as of November 15, 2026

Dylan Nealis (born July 30, 1998) is an American professional soccer player who plays as a right-back for Major League Soccer club New York Red Bulls.

== Career ==
=== Youth and Collegiate ===
Nealis began his career with local club Massapequa SC. He also played for Massapequa High School. As a sophomore in 2013, Nealis scored the winning goals in both the semi-final and final of the 2013 NYSPHSAA Class AA tournament where he was also named MVP.

As a junior in 2014, Nealis' Massapequa team finished undefeated in the regular season. Their playoff run ended with a 2–0 loss to the Syosset Braves in the Nassau County Class AA tournament.

In 2016, Nealis began his collegiate soccer career with the Georgetown Hoyas. In 2019, Nealis captained the Georgetown University team that won their first NCAA national championship. Nealis was named the Defensive Most Outstanding Player of the national tournament, becoming the first Hoya to win the honor. During the 2019 season, Nealis was also named a finalist for the MAC Hermann Trophy, an annual award to the top college soccer player in the nation.

During his college years, Nealis also played for USL League Two side Long Island Rough Riders.

=== Professional ===
On January 9, 2020, Nealis was selected by Inter Miami CF as the third overall pick in the 2020 MLS SuperDraft. Nealis made his professional debut on September 23, 2020, appearing as a starter in a 1–4 loss to New York Red Bulls. He ended his first season appearing in 20 matches for Inter Miami.

On April 11, 2021, Nealis was traded to Nashville SC in exchange for $175,000 in general allocation money and an additional $50,000 if he was to meet certain performance-based metrics. On April 24, 2021, Nealis made his debut with Nashville, appearing an injury-time substitute in a 2–2 draw with CF Montréal. On July 17, 2021, he started his first match for the club, recording an assist in a 5–1 victory over Chicago Fire FC.

On December 16, 2021, Nealis was traded to New York Red Bulls in exchange for $175,000 in general allocation money and an additional $75,000 if he was to meet certain performance-based metrics. On February 26, 2022, Nealis made his debut for New York, appearing as a starter in a 3–1 victory over San Jose Earthquakes in the opening match of the season. On May 25, 2022, Nealis scored his first goal as a professional in a 3–1 victory for New York over Charlotte FC as his team advanced to the quarterfinals of the 2022 U.S. Open Cup. In November 2023, Nealis signed a new contract with Red Bulls to remain through the 2024 season.

Nealis scored his first goal of the season on August 7, 2025 in a 1–1 draw with Liga MX side FC Juárez in a Leagues Cup match. He scored his first goal in MLS on August 16, 2025, in a 1–0 victory over the Philadelphia Union.

== Personal life ==
Nealis has three older brothers who all played soccer. His oldest brother, Jimmy, also played college soccer at Georgetown University and played professionally for the New York Cosmos. Nealis' older brother, Sean played collegiate soccer for Hofstra University and is currently a defender for DC United. His brother, Connor, played for Binghamton University.

== Career statistics ==
As of match played November 6, 2026

Appearances and goals by club, season and competition
Club	Season	League			U.S. Open Cup		Other		Total	
Club	Season	Division	Apps	Goals	Apps	Goals	Apps	Goals	Apps	Goals
Long Island Rough Riders	2017	USL PDL	8	0	—		3 (Note: Appearance(s) in USL PDL playoffs)	0	11	0
Long Island Rough Riders	2018	USL PDL	0	0	—		—		0	0
Long Island Rough Riders	2019	USL League Two	8	0	—		—		8	0
Long Island Rough Riders	Total		16	0	0	0	3	0	19	0
Inter Miami	2020	Major League Soccer	19	0	—		1 (Note: Appearance(s) in MLS Cup playoffs)	0	20	0
Nashville SC	2021	Major League Soccer	4	0	—		0	0	4	0
New York Red Bulls	2022	Major League Soccer	28	0	5	1	1	0	34	1
New York Red Bulls	2023	Major League Soccer	19	0	2	0	3	0	24	0
New York Red Bulls	2024	Major League Soccer	30	0	—		7 (Note: Five appearances in MLS Cup playoffs, two appearances in Leagues Cup)	0	37	0
New York Red Bulls	2025	Major League Soccer	18	1	1	0	3 (Note: Appearances in Leagues Cup)	1	22	2
New York Red Bulls	2026	Major League Soccer	29	0	1	0	—		30	0
New York Red Bulls	Total		124	1	9	1	14	1	147	3
Career total			163	1	9	1	18	1	190	3

== Honors ==
=== Individual ===
- Big East Conference Men's Soccer Defender of the Year: 2018, 2019
- NCAA Division I Men's Soccer Tournament Most Outstanding Defensive Player: 2019
- MAC Hermann Trophy Finalist: 2019

=== Team ===
- NCAA Division I Men's Soccer Tournament: 2019
- Big East Conference Men's Soccer Tournament: 2017, 2018, 2019
