= Jacob Montes =

Nicaraguan footballer (born 1998)

Personal information
- Full name: Jacob Christian Montes Hoff
- Date of birth: October 20, 1998 (age 28)
- Place of birth: Lake Worth Beach, Florida, United States
- Height: 1.78 m (5 ft 10 in)
- Position: Midfielder

Team information
- Current team: Monterey Bay FC
- Number: 16

Youth career
- 2011–2016: FC Florida Prep Academy
- 2016–2017: Portland Timbers

College career
Years	Team	Apps	(Gls)
2017–2021	Georgetown Hoyas	73	(15)

Senior career*
Years	Team	Apps	(Gls)
2017	Portland Timbers 2	8	(0)
2018–2019	Treasure Coast Tritons	12	(0)
2021–2022	Crystal Palace	0	(0)
2021–2022	→ Waasland-Beveren (loan)	9	(1)
2022	→ RWD Molenbeek (loan)	1	(0)
2022–2024	Botafogo	6	(1)
2024–2026	RWDM Brussels	21	(1)
2026–	Monterey Bay FC	9	(0)

International career^{‡}
2016	United States U19	1	(0)
2023–	Nicaragua	21	(4)
- * Club domestic league appearances and goals as of 18:48, 9 November 2026 (UTC) ‡ National team caps and goals as of October 5, 2026

Jacob Christian Montes Hoff (born October 20, 1998) is a professional footballer who plays as a midfielder for USL Championship club Monterey Bay FC. Born in the United States, he represents the Nicaragua national team.

At Georgetown, Montes was named the 2019 Big East Midfielder of the Year and helped the Hoyas win the 2019 NCAA national championship. In 2021, he became the first player in the history of Georgetown's men's soccer program to sign a Premier League contract when he joined Crystal Palace.

== Club career ==
=== Portland Timbers ===
Montes began his career with the FC Florida Prep Academy, whose alumni include Julian Gressel and Niko Hämäläinen. In October 2015, he trialled with English side Manchester United, and in February 2016, he spent a week with German club Borussia Dortmund.

In 2016, he joined the Portland Timbers Academy. Montes scored eight goals in 25 games for the Under-17/18 team and was subsequently signed to United Soccer League side Portland Timbers 2. He made his professional debut on March 25, 2017, as a 73rd-minute substitute in a 2–1 loss to Real Monarchs. Montes made a further seven appearances and was named the Timbers' 2017 Academy Player of the Year.

=== Georgetown University ===
After one season with the Timbers, he opted to play college soccer at Georgetown University for four years. In 2019, he scored 11 goals as he captained the team to its first NCAA National Championship. With a further five assists, he was named Big East Conference Midfielder of the Year. Montes rejected multiple contract offers from the Portland Timbers during his collegiate career.

In March 2021, Montes completed a trial with an undisclosed Premier League team who had been tracking him for several months. A month later, he opted out of pre-season training and notified Major League Soccer that he did not intend to play professionally in the United States for the 2021 season. On May 20, his MLS rights were made available to other clubs following the expiration of the Timbers' ownership, and later picked up by the New England Revolution.

=== Crystal Palace ===
On May 25, 2021, it was announced that Montes would join Premier League side Crystal Palace on a one-year deal, subject to international clearance. He completed the move without being eligible for a British work visa, meaning he would have to leave the club temporarily on loan.

==== Loans to Belgium ====
On July 31, 2021, Belgian First Division B Waasland-Beveren announced that they had acquired Montes from Crystal Palace on loan for one year, though this arrangement was ended in January 2022 and Montes joined another Belgian team, RWD Molenbeek, again on loan.

=== Botafogo ===
On August 12, 2022, Montes signed a two-year contract with Brazilian Série A club Botafogo. The move reunited him with Botafogo owner John Textor, who had previously overseen his transfers within his multi-club network, including Crystal Palace and Belgian side RWDM.

Initially considered an unknown prospect, Montes struggled for playing time in his first season, making only three Série A appearances and totalling 85 minutes. He did not feature at all for the club during the 2023 campaign. On April 21, 2024, he scored his first goal for Botafogo in a 5–1 victory over Juventude, marking just the second goal of his professional career and ending a scoring drought of 1,146 days.

=== RWDM Brussels ===
In the summer of 2024, Montes returned to RWD Molenbeek, which had since rebranded as RWDM Brussels, remaining within the multi-club network owned by John Textor. In January 2025, Montes sustained an injury that ruled him out for the remainder of the season.

=== Monterey Bay FC ===
On August 5, 2026, Montes returned to the United States, joining USL Championship side Monterey Bay FC on a short-term deal until the end of the season.

== International career ==
On October 7, 2016, Montes made his under-19 international debut for the United States in a 4–0 friendly victory against Liga MX side Club Tijuana. Montes is also eligible to play for Nicaragua through his paternal family. In March 2021, he discussed a potential call-up to the Nicaragua national team for the 2022 World Cup qualifiers later that month.

Montes made his international debut for Nicaragua in a friendly match against Panama on June 10, 2023.

== Career statistics ==
As of July 13, 2022

Appearances and goals by club, season and competition
Club	Season	League			Other		Total	
Club	Season	Division	Apps	Goals	Apps	Goals	Apps	Goals
Portland Timbers 2	2017	USL Championship	8	0	—		8	0
Treasure Coast Tritons	2018	USL PDL	6	0	—		6	0
Treasure Coast Tritons	2019	USL League Two	6	0	—		6	0
Treasure Coast Tritons	Total		12	0	–		12	0
Waasland-Beveren	2021–22	Belgian First Division B	9	1	—		9	1
RWD Molenbeek	2021–22	Belgian First Division B	1	0	—		1	0
Career total			30	1	–		30	1

=== International goals ===
Scores and results list Nicaragua's goal tally first.

No.	Date	Venue	Opponent	Score	Result	Competition	Ref.
1	September 11, 2023	Estadio Nacional de Fútbol, Managua, Nicaragua	Barbados	5–0	5–1	2023–24 CONCACAF Nations League B	
2	October 13, 2023	Wildey Turf, Wildey, Barbados	Montserrat	3–0	3–0	2023–24 CONCACAF Nations League B	
3	November 17, 2023	Wildey Turf, Wildey, Barbados	Barbados	4–0	4–0	2023–24 CONCACAF Nations League B	
4	June 5, 2024	Estadio Nacional de Fútbol, Managua, Nicaragua	Montserrat	3–1	4–1	2026 FIFA World Cup qualification	
