= St. John's Red Storm men's soccer =

American college soccer team

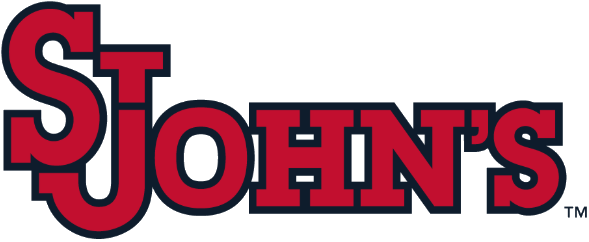
- Founded: 1979; 47 years ago
- University: St. John's University (New York City)
- Head coach: David Masur (27th season)
- Conference: Big East
- Location: New York City, US
- Stadium: Belson Stadium (capacity: 2,168)
- Nickname: Red Storm
- Colors: Red and white
Home	Away

NCAA tournament championships
- 1996

NCAA tournament runner-up
- 2003

NCAA tournament College Cup
- 1996, 2001, 2003, 2008

NCAA tournament Quarterfinals
- 1996, 1998, 2001, 2003, 2008

NCAA tournament appearances
- 1992, 1993, 1994, 1995, 1996, 1997, 1998, 1999, 2000, 2001, 2002, 2003, 2004, 2005, 2006, 2008, 2009, 2011, 2012, 2013, 2019, 2021, 2025

Conference tournament championships
- 1992, 1993, 1994, 1995, 1998, 2001, 2006, 2009, 2011

Conference regular season championships
- 1992, 1993, 1996, 1997, 2003, 2008

The St. John's Red Storm men's soccer team represents St. John's University in New York City in NCAA Division I. They compete in the Big East Conference and have experienced consistent success in both conference and national competitions.

The St. John's men's soccer program has appeared in 15 consecutive NCAA tournaments, advancing to the Sweet 16 in each of the last ten seasons, and the Final Four on 3 occasions. They have captured 11 Big East Championships, including the 2006 season title as well as the 2009 season title, and in 1996, St. John's won the NCAA National Championship. Their home games are hosted at Belson Stadium, a state-of-the-art 2,300-seat stadium on the university campus. In 2006, the men's soccer team became the first American soccer team to be invited to play in Vietnam. The team played against several Vietnam Football Federation squads as well as participating in community service.

== History ==
St. John's won the 1996 NCAA Division Championship, made four appearances in the NCAA College Cup (1996, 2001, 2003 and 2008) and reached sixteen NCAA post-season tournaments, including fifteen straight from 1992 to 2006. The Red Storm also reached ten consecutive NCAA Tournament rounds of sixteen from 1996 to 2005. Under Coach Masur, the Red Storm have also won seven Big East tournament titles, six regular season crowns and has qualified for eighteen consecutive Big East tournaments. Their home games are hosted at Belson Stadium, a state-of-the-art 2,168-seat stadium on the university campus, which sells out often. In 2006, the men's soccer team became the first American soccer team to be invited to play in Vietnam. The team played against several Vietnam Football Federation squads as well as participating in community service.

From 1992 to 2013, the Red Storm went to the NCAA National Championship in 20 of 22 seasons, with four appearances in the College Cup semifinals and two appearances in the final, winning the national championship in 1996. The team posted 27 consecutive seasons with a win percentage of .500 or better from 1987 to 2013 before suffering three consecutive losing seasons from 2014 to 2016.

In conference play, the St. John's men's soccer team has won six conference regular season championships and nine conference tournament championships; the most recent being in 2011. They are currently coached by Dave Masur who will be in his 24th season leading the Red Storm in 2014.

Technically, the team was founded prior to 1979. They were a club team playing local colleges and universities. 1979 is the year the team transitioned to D1.

== Roster ==
As of 12 July 2026

Note: Flags indicate national team as defined under FIFA eligibility rules; some limited exceptions apply. Players may hold more than one non-FIFA nationality.

No.	Pos.	Nation	Player
00	GK	USA	Nicholas Bezama
0	GK	BRA	Mateusz Sakaue
1	GK	ENG	Alec McLachlan
2	DF	USA	Jeremy Sharp
3	DF	POR	Igor Gonçalves
4	DF	CAN	Markus Pusztahegyi
5	DF	JAM	Antonio Biggs
6	DF	GER	Bjorn Nikolajewski
7	MF	USA	Jad Benjelloun
8	MF	GER	Julian Jakopovic
9	FW	FRA	Gabin Thomelier
10	MF	JPN	Takuto Kawase
11	FW	USA	Xavi Abeijon
12	DF	NOR	Ivar Nå Aga
13	FW	USA	Travis Thompson
14	FW	CAN	Ank Nibogora
15	MF	BRA	Guilherme Gomes
16	FW	USA	Luca Fargnoli

No.	Pos.	Nation	Player
17	FW	USA	Mateusz Marciniak
18	MF	CAN	Gabe Smyth
19	MF	USA	Andrew Porucznik
20	DF	CHI	Diego Vásquez
21	MF	USA	Jayden Montgomery
22	MF	USA	Dylan Gugin
23	MF	USA	Jorian Michelis
24	MF	USA	Charlie Joyce
25	FW	USA	Jack Guerin
26	MF	USA	Kaief Tomlinson
27	FW	USA	Bradyn Cobb
28	DF	USA	Damian Halat
29	FW	SRB	Dušan Ranisavljevic
30	DF	GHA	Godwin Partey
31	GK	USA	Amari Thompson
-	DF	USA	Lohkoah Paye

== Titles ==
=== National ===
Championship	Titles	Winning years
NCAA tournament	1	1996

=== Conference ===
Conference	Championship	Titles	Winning years
Big East	Tournament	9	1992, 1993, 1994, 1995, 1998, 2001, 2006, 2009, 2011
Big East	Regular season	6	1992, 1993, 1996, 1997, 2003, 2008

== Record by year ==
Season	Coach	Overall	Conference	Standing	Postseason
St. John's (Division I Independent) (1979–1979)
1979	Bill Clarke	10-2-1			
St. John's (Tri-State Conference) (1980–1984)
1980	Bill Clarke	7-7-3	4-2-2		
1981	Bill Clarke	7-11-1	5-3-0		
1982	Fred Agnostakis	9-9-1	5-2-1		
1983	Fred Agnostakis	8-10-0	6-2-0		
1984	Fred Agnostakis	6-8-2	5-2-1		
St. John's (Big East Conference) (1985–2012)
1985	Fred Agnostakis	11-7-1	3-1-0	2nd South Division	
1986	Fred Agnostakis	4-8-3	1-2-1	5th South Division	
1987	Fred Agnostakis	9-7-3	2-1-1	2nd South Division	
1988	Fred Agnostakis	9-9-1	2-2-0	3rd South Division	
1989	Fred Agnostakis	11-7-1	2-2-0	3rd South Division	
1990	Fred Agnostakis	8-8-1	1-6-1	9th	
1991	Dave Masur	12-5-2	5-2-1	3rd	
1992	Dave Masur	17-3-2	8-0-0	1st	Lost 1st round
1993	Dave Masur	18-1-3	6-0-2	1st	Lost 1st round
1994	Dave Masur	14-5-3	6-1-1	2nd	Lost 1st round
1995	Dave Masur	16-5-1	6-3-1	4th	Lost 1st round
1996	Dave Masur	22-2-2	9-1-1	1st	NCAA Champions
1997	Dave Masur	18-4-2	9-1-1	1st	Lost 2nd round
1998	Dave Masur	16-5-3	8-2-1	2nd	Lost Elite 8
1999	Dave Masur	12-6-3	6-2-3	4th	Lost 2nd round
2000	Dave Masur	14-5-2	8-2-1	2nd	Lost 2nd round
2001	Dave Masur	17-3-3	6-1-3	3rd	3rd Place
2002	Dave Masur	13-3-5	7-1-2	2nd	Lost Sweet 16
2003	Dave Masur	17-6-3	8-2-0	1st	NCAA Runner-up
2004	Dave Masur	12-6-4	6-1-3	2nd	Lost Sweet 16
2005	Dave Masur	11-6-5	6-2-3	2nd Red Division	Lost Sweet 16
2006	Dave Masur	14-6-2	5-4-2	3rd Red Division	Lost 2nd round
2007	Dave Masur	9-7-5	6-3-2	3rd Red Division	
2008	Dave Masur	19-3-3	8-1-2	1st	3rd Place
2009	Dave Masur	9-3-9	6-1-4	2nd Red Division	Lost 2nd round
2010	Dave Masur	10-6-2	4-3-2	3rd Red Division	
2011	Dave Masur	14-7-2	4-5-0	3rd Red Division	Lost 2nd round
2012	Dave Masur	10-5-4	4-3-1	3rd Red Division	Lost 1st round
St. John's (Big East Conference) (2013–present)
2013	Dave Masur	11-7-2	3-4-2	7th	Lost 2nd round
2014	Dave Masur	4-10-4	1-7-1	10th	
2015	Dave Masur	4-11-3	2-5-2	8th	
2016	Dave Masur	6-7-4	2-5-2	8th	
2017	Dave Masur	9-7-3	5-2-2	3rd	
2018	Dave Masur	7-8-3	3-3-3	6th	
2019	Dave Masur	14-5-1	6-2-1	2nd	Lost Sweet 16
2020–21	Dave Masur	5-5	3–5		
2021	Dave Masur	11-6-3	5-3-2	3rd	Lost 2nd round
2022	Dave Masur	4-8-5	2-4-4	8th	
2023	Dave Masur	8-4-5	3-1-4	3rd East Division	
2024	Dave Masur	7-5-5	5-1-2	1st East Division	
2025	Dave Masur	9-5-4	3-3-2	5th East Division	Lost 1st Round
Total:		499-268-122			
National champion Postseason invitational champion Conference regular season champion Conference regular season and conference tournament champion Division regular season champion Division regular season and conference tournament champion Conference tournament champion
