= Providence Friars men's soccer =

American college soccer team

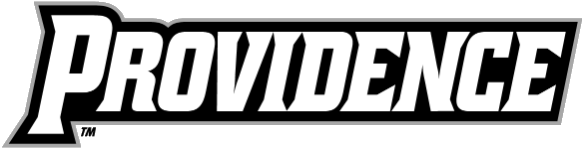
- Founded: 1968; 58 years ago
- University: Providence College
- Head coach: Craig Stewart (13th season)
- Conference: Big East
- Location: Providence, Rhode Island, US
- Stadium: Chapey Field at Anderson Stadium (capacity: 3,000)
- Nickname: Friars
- Colors: Black, white, and silver
Home	Away

NCAA tournament College Cup
- 2014

NCAA tournament Quarterfinals
- 2014, 2016

NCAA tournament Round of 16
- 2014, 2016, 2021

NCAA tournament Round of 32
- 2005, 2010, 2013, 2014, 2016, 2021, 2024

NCAA tournament appearances
- 1983, 2005, 2006, 2007, 2010, 2011, 2013, 2014, 2016, 2021, 2024

The Providence Friars men's soccer program represents Providence College in all NCAA Division I men's college soccer competitions. Founded in 1968, the Friars compete in the Big East Conference. The Friars are coached by Craig Stewart, a former semi-professional player and head coach for the Franklin Pierce Ravens men's soccer program. Providence plays their home matches at Chapey Field at Anderson Stadium.

== Individual honors ==
=== First Team All-Americans ===
Providence has fielded three first-team All-Americans.

Player	Pos.	Year
Julian Gressel	MF	2016
Ryan Maduro	MF	2006
Seamus Purcell	DF	1987

=== Second Team All-Americans ===
Providence has fielded one second-team All-American.

Player	Pos.	Year
Martin Hayes	MF	1983

=== Third Team All-Americans ===
Providence has fielded three third-team All-Americans.

Player	Pos.	Year
Phil Towler	MF	2014
Seamus Purcell	DF	1988
Martin Hayes	MF	1984

== Coaching history ==
Updated through the end of the 2017 season.

Year	Coach	Games	W	L	T	Pct.
1968–1994	(United States) Bill Doyle	397	207	155	35	.565
1995–1999	(Republic of Ireland) Brian Ainscough	90	28	56	6	.344
2000–2011	(Canada) Chaka Daley	228	90	111	27	.454
2012–	(England) Craig Stewart	119	60	43	16	.571

== Postseason records ==
=== NCAA Tournament ===
Providence have appeared in twelve NCAA Tournaments. Their first appearance came in 1983. Their most recent came in 2024.

Year	Round	Rival	Result
1983	First round	Connecticut	L 0–2
2005	First round Second round	Hofstra; North Carolina	W 1–0 ^{OT} L 0–2
2006	First round	Hofstra	L 0–2
2007	First round	Old Dominion	L 0–1
2010	First round Second round	Saint Peter's; Ohio State	W 6–2; L 1–2
2011	First round Second round	Dartmouth; UC Santa Barbara	W 1–0; L 2–3
2013	First round Second round	Penn; Maryland	T 0–0 ^{PK} L 1–3
2014	Second round Third round Quarterfinal; Semifinal	Dartmouth; UC Irvine; Michigan State; UCLA	W 3–0; W 1–0; W 3–2; L 2–3 ^{2OT}
2016	First round Second round Third round Quarterfinal	Delaware; Maryland; Creighton; North Carolina	W 2–0; W 5–4; W 2–1; L 0–1 ^{2OT}
2019	First round Second round Third round	NJIT; Penn State; Clemson	W 2–0; W 3-2 ^{OT} L 2-1 ^{2OT}
2021	First round Second round Third round	Marist; Marshall; Georgetown	W 2–0; W 2-1 ^{OT} L 1–4
2024	First round Second round	Bucknell; Clemson	W 2–1; L 0-2
