= 2022 Big East Conference men's soccer season =

- League: NCAA Division I
- Sport: Soccer
- Duration: August 25 – December 13, 2022
- Teams: 11
- TV partner(s): Fox Sports (Fox/FS2, BEDN)

2023 MLS SuperDraft

Regular season
- Champions: Georgetown
- Season MVP: Duncan McGuire, Creighton

Tournament
- Champions: Creighton
- Runners-up: Georgetown
- Finals MVP: Offensive: Duncan McGuire, Creighton; Defensive: Paul Kruse, Creighton

Men's Soccer seasons
- 2021 2023

2022 Big East Conference men's soccer standings
	Conf.					Overall
Team	W		L		T	W		L		T
No. 20 Georgetown+	8	–	1	–	1	12	–	6	–	3
Seton Hall+	4	–	1	–	5	7	–	4	–	7
Xavier	3	–	1	–	6	9	–	2	–	7
Butler	4	–	3	–	3	10	–	6	–	3
Providence	3	–	2	–	5	5	–	5	–	7
No. 9 Creighton‡	3	–	3	–	4	13	–	5	–	6
UConn	3	–	4	–	3	7	–	7	–	3
St. John's	2	–	4	–	4	4	–	8	–	5
DePaul	1	–	4	–	5	4	–	6	–	7
Villanova	2	–	6	–	2	6	–	8	–	3
Marquette	1	–	5	–	4	5	–	9	–	4
‡ – 2022 Big East Tournament champion + – At-large invitation to the 2022 NCAA tournament; As of December 13, 2022; Rankings from United Soccer Coaches; Source: Big East

The 2022 Big East Conference men's soccer season was the tenth season for the newly realigned Big East Conference. Including the history of the original Big East Conference, this was the 27th season of men's soccer under the "Big East Conference" name.

== Coaching changes ==
There were two head coaching change ahead of the 2022 season. Longtime UConn head coach, Ray Reid retired after coaching the program for 24 years. Former Northeastern head coach, Chris Gbandi, was hired to replace the outgoing Reid. After 12 seasons, Xavier head coach, Andy Fleming agreed to mutually terminate his contract with the university. Fleming was replaced by John Higgins, who had previously coached at the University of Indianapolis.

=== Coaches ===
Note: All stats current through the completion of the 2021 season

Team	Head coach	Previous job	Years at school	Overall record	Record at school	Big East record
Butler	Paul Snape	Michigan (asst.)	12	92–79–31 (.532)	92–79–31 (.532)	41–34–5 (.544)
Creighton	Johnny Torres	Creighton (asst.)	5	34–25–7 (.568)	34–25–7 (.568)	21–12–3 (.625)
DePaul	Mark Plotkin	Colgate	5	0–0–0 (–)	0–0–0 (–)	0–0–0 (–)
Georgetown	Brian Wiese	Notre Dame (asst.)	17	0–0–0 (–)	0–0–0 (–)	0–0–0 (–)
Marquette	Louis Bennett	Milwaukee	17	241–201–57 (.540)	106–137–40 (.445)	52–77–21 (.417)
Providence	Craig Stewart	Franklin Pierce	11	153–74–29 (.654)	102–66–24 (.594)	0–0–0 (–)
St. John's	David Masur	Montclair State	32	0–0–0 (–)	0–0–0 (–)	0–0–0 (–)
Seton Hall	Andreas Lindberg	LIU	5	0–0–0 (–)	0–0–0 (–)	0–0–0 (–)
UConn	Chris Gbandi	Northeastern	1	32–52–10 (.394)	0–0–0 (–)	0–0–0 (–)
Villanova	Tom Carlin	Villanova (asst.)	15	0–0–0 (–)	0–0–0 (–)	0–0–0 (–)
Xavier	John Higgins	UIndy	1	150–56–29 (.700)	0–0–0 (–)	0–0–0 (–)

== Preseason ==
=== Recruiting classes ===
Rankings
Team	TDS	CSN	Signees
Butler			
Creighton			
DePaul			
Georgetown			
Marquette			
Providence			
St. John's			
Seton Hall			
UConn			
Villanova			
Xavier			

=== Preseason Coaches polls ===
The preseason polls was released on August 17, 2022. Providence was picked to win the Big East.

Predicted finish	Team	Votes (1st place)
1	Providence	94 (4)
2	Georgetown	93 (7)
3	St. John's	79
4	Creighton	71
5	Butler	60
6	Villanova	59
7	Marquette	49
8	UConn	38
9	DePaul	23
10	Seton Hall	22
11	Xavier	17

=== Preseason awards ===
==== Hermann Trophy Watchlist ====
The Hermann Trophy Watchlist will be announced on August 25, 2022.

==== Preseason All Big East ====
First Team
Position	Player	Class	Team
FW	Wilmer Cabrera Jr.	SR	Butler
FW	Lukas Sunesson	SR	Marquette
FW	Gevork Diarbian	JR	Providence
FW	Lyam MacKinnon	SR	Villanova
MF	Mateo Leveque	SO	UConn
MF	Charles Auguste	SR	Creighton
MF	Luis Garcia	SR	Providence
DF	Daniel Wu	SR	Georgetown
DF	Ramzi Qawasmy	GR	Providence
DF	Brandon Knapp	GR	St. John's
GK	Paul Kruse	GR	Creighton

==== Preseason Players of the Year ====
2022 Big East Men's Soccer Individual Preseason Awards
Award	Recipient(s)
Offensive Player of the Year	Wilmer Cabrera Jr., Butler
Co-Defensive Players of the Year	Daniel Wu, Georgetown; Ramzi Qawasmy, Providence
Goalkeeper of the Year	Paul Kruse, Creighton

== Rankings ==
=== National rankings ===
	Improvement in ranking
	Drop in ranking
RV	Received votes but were not ranked in Top 25
NV	No votes received

		Pre	Wk 1	Wk 2	Wk 3	Wk 4	Wk 5	Wk 6	Wk 7	Wk 8	Wk 9	Wk 10	Wk 11	Wk 12	Wk 13	Wk 14	Wk 15	Wk 16	Final
Butler	USC	NV													None released				
Butler	TDS	NV																	
Butler	CSN	NV																	
Creighton	USC	NV													None released				
Creighton	TDS	NV																	
Creighton	CSN	NV																	
DePaul	USC	NV													None released				
DePaul	TDS	NV																	
DePaul	CSN	NV																	
Georgetown	USC	2													None released				
Georgetown	TDS	2																	
Georgetown	CSN	3																	
Marquette	USC	NV													None released				
Marquette	TDS	NV																	
Marquette	CSN	NV																	
Providence	USC	16													None released				
Providence	TDS	6																	
Providence	CSN	14																	
St. John's	USC	RV													None released				
St. John's	TDS	25																	
St. John's	CSN	30																	
Seton Hall	USC	NV													None released				
Seton Hall	TDS	NV																	
Seton Hall	CSN	NV																	
UConn	USC	NV													None released				
UConn	TDS	NV																	
UConn	CSN	NV																	
Villanova	USC	NV													None released				
Villanova	TDS	NV																	
Villanova	CSN	NV																	
Xavier	USC	NV													None released				
Xavier	TDS	NV																	
Xavier	CSN	NV																	

=== Regional rankings - USC Midwest Region ===
	Improvement in ranking
	Drop in ranking
RV	Received votes but were not ranked in Top 10
NV	No votes received

The United Soccer Coaches' Midwest region ranks teams across the Big East, Horizon, and Missouri Valley Conferences.

	Wk 1	Wk 2	Wk 3	Wk 4	Wk 5	Wk 6	Wk 7	Wk 8	Wk 9	Wk 10	Wk 11	Wk 12
Butler												
Creighton												
DePaul												
Georgetown												
Marquette												
Providence												
St. John's												
Seton Hall												
UConn												
Villanova												
Xavier												

== Awards and honors ==
=== Player of the week honors ===
Following each week's games, Big East conference officials select the player of the week.

Week	Player	School	Pos.	Ref.
Sep. 6				
Sep. 13				
Sep. 20				
Sep. 27				
Oct. 4				
Oct. 11				
Oct. 18				
Oct. 25				
Nov. 1				
Nov. 8				
Nov. 15				

=== Postseason honors ===
2022 Big East Men's Soccer Individual Awards
Award	Recipient(s)
Offensive Player of the Year	Duncan McGuire, Creighton
Midfielder of the Year	Aidan Rocha, Georgetown
Defensive Player of the Year	Daniel Wu, Georgetown
Goalkeeper of the Year	Cole Jensen, Xavier
Freshman of the Year	Palmer Ault, Butler
Coaching Staff of the Year	Georgetown

2022 Big East Men's Soccer All-Conference Teams
First Team Honorees	Second Team Honorees	Third Team Honorees
Palmer Ault, Butler; Wilmer Cabrera, Butler; Mateo Leveque, UConn; Charles Auguste, Creighton; Duncan McGuire, Creighton; Owen O’Malley, Creighton; Aidan Rocha, Georgetown; Daniel Wu, Georgetown; Luca Dahn, Seton Hall; Quenzi Huerman, Seton Hall; Cole Jensen, Xavier	Jack Haywood, Butler; Jackson Castro, Creighton; Ryan Schewe, Georgetown; Marlon Tabora, Georgetown; Edrey Caceres, Marquette; Gevork Diarbian, Providence; Ramzi Qawasmy, Providence; Brandon Knapp, St. John's; Antek Sienkiel, St. John's; Lyam MacKinnon, Villanova; Makel Rasheed, Xavier	Jayden Reid, UConn; Paul Kruse, Creighton; Giorgio Probo, Creighton; Callum Watson, Creighton; Jake Fuderer, DePaul; Kenny Nielsen, Georgetown; Jack Panayotou, Georgetown; Kieran Sargeant, Georgetown; Lukas Sunesson, Marquette; Chris Roman, Providence; Johannes Pex, Seton Hall; Dylan Kropp, Xavier

== MLS SuperDraft ==
=== Total picks by school ===
Team	Round 1	Round 2	Round 3	Total
Butler	–	–	1	1
Creighton	2	–	–	2
DePaul	–	–	–	0
Georgetown	–	1	1	2
Marquette	–	–	–	0
Providence	–	–	–	0
St. John's	–	–	–	0
Seton Hall	–	–	–	0
UConn	–	–	1	1
Villanova	–	–	1	1
Xavier	1	–	1	2
Total	3	1	5	9

=== List of selections ===
Round	Pick #	MLS team	Player	Position	College
1	6	Orlando City SC	(United States) Duncan McGuire	FW	Creighton
1	9	St. Louis City SC	(United States) Owen O'Malley	MF	Creighton
1	18	Inter Miami CF	(United States) Cole Jensen	GK	Xavier
2	57	Philadelphia Union	(United States) Stefan Stojanovic	FW	Georgetown
3	60	D.C. United	(United States) Aidan Rocha	MF	Georgetown
3	63	Houston Dynamo FC	(Haiti) Frantz Pierrot	FW	UConn
3	65	Nashville SC	(United States) Makel Rasheed	DF	Xavier
3	76	Chicago Fire FC	(Colombia) Wilmer Cabrera Jr.	FW	Butler
3	84	Nashville SC	(Switzerland) Lyam MacKinnon	FW	Villanova

== See also ==
- 2022 Big East Conference women's soccer season
