= 2022 Creighton Bluejays men's soccer team =

American college soccer season

2022 Creighton Bluejays men's soccer

Big East tournament champions

NCAA tournament, College Cup
- Conference: Big East Conference

Ranking
- Coaches: No. 9
- TopDrawerSoccer.com: No. 4
- Record: 13–4–6 (3–3–4 Big East)
- Head coach: Johnny Torres (5th season)
- Assistant coaches: Ian Sarachan (4th season); Michael Gabb (7th season); Mitch Kavanagh (4th season)
- Home stadium: Morrison Stadium

2022 Big East Conference men's soccer standings
	Conf.					Overall
Team	W		L		T	W		L		T
No. 20 Georgetown+	8	–	1	–	1	12	–	6	–	3
Seton Hall+	4	–	1	–	5	7	–	4	–	7
Xavier	3	–	1	–	6	9	–	2	–	7
Butler	4	–	3	–	3	10	–	6	–	3
Providence	3	–	2	–	5	5	–	5	–	7
No. 9 Creighton‡	3	–	3	–	4	13	–	5	–	6
UConn	3	–	4	–	3	7	–	7	–	3
St. John's	2	–	4	–	4	4	–	8	–	5
DePaul	1	–	4	–	5	4	–	6	–	7
Villanova	2	–	6	–	2	6	–	8	–	3
Marquette	1	–	5	–	4	5	–	9	–	4
‡ – 2022 Big East Tournament champion + – At-large invitation to the 2022 NCAA tournament; As of December 13, 2022; Rankings from United Soccer Coaches; Source: Big East

The 2022 season was the 44th season of Creighton University fielding a men's varsity soccer team. It was the program's 10th season in the Big East Conference, and its fifth season with Johnny Torres as the head coach of the program. Creighton played their home matches at Morrison Stadium in Omaha, Nebraska.

Creighton finished the regular season 6–4–6 before going on a seven-match winning-streak that involved winning their first Big East Conference men's soccer tournament ever, and their first soccer conference tournament championship since winning the Missouri Valley Conference men's soccer tournament in 2012. It was also the first season since 2012 that the Bluejays reached the College Cup of the NCAA Division I men's soccer tournament, being unseeded and defeated three seeded programs en route to the College Cup. There, they were eliminated by Syracuse University, losing the game 2–3.

Duncan McGuire led the entire NCAA in goals scored during the 2022 season, scoring 22 goals.

== Roster ==
=== Squad ===
As of December 4, 2022

Note: Flags indicate national team as defined under FIFA eligibility rules; some limited exceptions apply. Players may hold more than one non-FIFA nationality.

No.	Pos.	Nation	Player
1	GK	GER	Paul Kruse
2	DF	CRC	Fabian Álvarez
3	DF	USA	Luke Mitchell
4	DF	AUS	Mitch Dobson
5	DF	POR	Miguel Ventura
6	MF	USA	Landon Sloan
7	DF	GER	Malte Kaiser
8	MF	HAI	Charles Auguste
9	FW	ENG	Alfie Pope
10	MF	CHI	Diego Dutilh
11	MF	BRA	Guilherme Viserta
12	MF	USA	Dominic Briggs
13	FW	USA	Duncan McGuire
14	MF	ENG	Callum Watson
15	DF	USA	Ben Foulks
16	MF	USA	Jackson Castro

No.	Pos.	Nation	Player
17	MF	DEN	Alejandro Maillet
18	MF	USA	Owen O'Malley
19	MF	USA	Sean Green
20	DF	ENG	Liam Gilligan
21	FW	USA	Marcos Pessanha
22	DF	USA	Cameron Briggs
23	MF	USA	Mark O'Neill
24	GK	USA	Nathan Schnur
25	DF	USA	Jake Ashford
26	MF	USA	Owen Nelson
27	MF	ITA	Giorgio Probo
28	DF	USA	Luke Waters
29	MF	USA	Ryan Brakke
30	GK	AUS	Patrick Millard
33	GK	USA	Andrew Karcher

=== Coaching staff ===
2022 Creighton Bluejays men's soccer coaching staff
Name	Position	Seasons at Creighton	Alma mater
Johnny Torres	Head coach	5	Creighton University (1997)
Ian Sarachan	Assistant Coach	4	University of Illinois Chicago (2010)
Michael Gabb	Assistant Coach	7	Creighton University (2002)
Mitch Kavanagh	Assistant Coach	4	Bellevue University (2015)

== Schedule ==
Date Time, TV	Rank^{#}	Opponent^{#}	Result	Record	Site (Attendance) City, State
Preseason
August 12*; 6:30 pm		Drake	W 5–2		Morrison Stadium; Omaha, NE
August 16*; 12:00 pm		Bradley	W 4–1		Morrison Stadium; Omaha, NE
August 19*; 6:30 pm		Denver	W 2–0		Morrison Stadium; Omaha, NE
Non-conference regular season
August 25*; 6:30 pm, Flosports		Oakland	W 6–0	1–0–0	Morrison Stadium (896); Omaha, NE
August 28*; 6:30 pm, Flosports		Rutgers	W 6–1	2–0–0	Morrison Stadium (1,615); Omaha, NE
September 2*; 6:30 pm, Flosports	No. 7	No. 10 Saint Louis	L 2–3	2–1–0	Morrison Stadium (1,413); Omaha, NE
September 5*; 6:30 pm, Flosports	No. 7	San Diego State	T 2–2	2–1–1	Morrison Stadium (1,178); Omaha, NE
September 9*; 7:30 pm, Flosports		No. 2 Stanford; Socctoberfest	T 1–1	2–1–2	Morrison Stadium (4,196); Omaha, NE
September 14*; 7:00 pm		at Omaha; Dodge Street Derby	W 6–1	3–1–2	Al F. Caniglia Field (1,996); Omaha, NE
Big East regular season
September 18; 6:30 pm, BEDN		UConn	T 1–1	3–1–3 (0–0–1)	Morrison Stadium (2,629); Omaha, NE
September 24; 12:00 pm, BEDN		at No. 25 Georgetown	L 1–2	3–2–3 (0–1–1)	Shaw Field (887); Washington, DC
October 1; 6:30 pm, BEDN		Villanova	W 3–1	4–2–3 (1–1–1)	Morrison Stadium (1,562); Omaha, NE
October 8; 6:30 pm, BEDN		St. John's	T 1–1	4–2–4 (1–1–2)	Morrison Stadium (1,283); Omaha, NE
October 12; 6:00 pm, BEDN		at Xavier	L 1–3	4–3–4 (1–2–2)	Corcoran Field (519); Cincinnati, OH
October 15; 2:00 pm, BEDN		at Seton Hall	T 1–1	4–3–5 (1–2–3)	Morrison Stadium (949); Omaha, NE
October 19; 2:00 pm, BEDN		Butler	W 4–2	5–3–5 (2–2–3)	Morrison Stadium (1,083); Omaha, NE
October 22; 7:00 pm, BEDN		at Marquette	T 2–2	5–3–6 (2–2–4)	Valley Fields (256); Milwaukee, WI
October 29; 6:30 pm, BEDN		DePaul	W 3–0	6–3–6 (3–2–4)	Morrison Stadium (935); Omaha, NE
November 2; 6:00 pm, BEDN		at Providence	L 2–4	6–4–6 (3–3–4)	Anderson Stadium (893); Providence, RI
Big East tournament
November 5; 6:00 pm, BEDN	(6)	at (3) Xavier; Quarterfinals	W 2–1	7–4–6	Corcoran Field (467); Cincinnati, OH
November 10; 3:00 pm, Flosports	(6)	vs. (2) Seton Hall; Semifinals	W 6–0	8–4–6	Maryland SoccerPlex (247); Boyds, MD
November 13; 11:30 am, FS1	(6)	vs. (1) No. 14 Georgetown; Final	W 3–0	9–4–6	Maryland SoccerPlex (1,147); Boyds, MD
NCAA tournament
November 17; 11:30 am, ESPN+		No. 23 Missouri State; First round	W 2–1	10–4–6	Morrison Stadium (1,054); Omaha, NE
November 20; 7:00 pm, ESPN+		at (2) No. 1 Washington; Second round	W 3–1	11–4–6	Husky Soccer Stadium (2,261); Seattle, WA
November 26; 6:00 pm, ESPN+		at (15) No. 17 Tulsa; Third round	W 2–1	12–4–6	Hurricane Soccer & Track Stadium (540); Tulsa, OK
December 3; 6:00 pm, ACCNX		at (7) No. 4 Duke; Quarterfinals	W 3–2	13–4–6	Hurricane Soccer & Track Stadium (1,061); Durham, NC
December 9; 5:00 pm, ESPNU		vs. (3) No. 3 Syracuse; College Cup Semifinal	L 2–3	13–5–6	WakeMed Soccer Park (10,286); Cary, NC
*Non-conference game. ^{#}Rankings from United Soccer Coaches. (#) Tournament seedings in parentheses. All times are in Central Time.

== Rankings ==
Ranking movements Legend: ██ Increase in ranking ██ Decrease in ranking — = Not ranked RV = Received votes
	Week																		
Poll	Pre	1	2	3	4	5	6	7	8	9	10	11	12	13	14	15	16	17	Final
United Soccer National	RV	7	RV	RV	—	—	—	—	—	—	—	—	Not released						9
United Soccer East Region	3	1	5	8	5	7	8	10	—	—	9	10	Not released						
TopDrawer Soccer	—	—	RV	—	—	—	—	—	—	—	—	—	—	RV	17	9	9	4	
CollegeSoccerNews.com	25	22	30	27	24	RV	RV	—	—	RV	RV	—	17	Not released					
