= 2022 Big East Conference men's soccer tournament =

- Classification: Division I
- Teams: 6
- Matches: 5
- Attendance: 3,530
- Site: Maryland SoccerPlex (Semifinals and Finals); Boyds, Maryland
- Champions: Creighton (1st title)
- Winning coach: Johnny Torres (1st title)
- MVP: Duncan McGuire (Offensive); Paul Kruse (Defensive) (Creighton)
- Broadcast: Big East Network (Quarterfinals and Semifinals), Fox Sports 1 (Final)

2022 Big East Conference men's soccer standings
	Conf.					Overall
Team	W		L		T	W		L		T
No. 20 Georgetown+	8	–	1	–	1	12	–	6	–	3
Seton Hall+	4	–	1	–	5	7	–	4	–	7
Xavier	3	–	1	–	6	9	–	2	–	7
Butler	4	–	3	–	3	10	–	6	–	3
Providence	3	–	2	–	5	5	–	5	–	7
No. 9 Creighton‡	3	–	3	–	4	13	–	5	–	6
UConn	3	–	4	–	3	7	–	7	–	3
St. John's	2	–	4	–	4	4	–	8	–	5
DePaul	1	–	4	–	5	4	–	6	–	7
Villanova	2	–	6	–	2	6	–	8	–	3
Marquette	1	–	5	–	4	5	–	9	–	4
‡ – 2022 Big East Tournament champion + – At-large invitation to the 2022 NCAA tournament; As of December 13, 2022; Rankings from United Soccer Coaches; Source: Big East

The 2022 Big East Conference men's soccer tournament was the post-season women's soccer tournament for the Big East Conference held from November 5 to 13, 2022, in the USA. The five-match tournament took place at Maryland SoccerPlex in Boyds, Maryland for the semifinals and finals, while the first round was hosted by the higher seeded team. The six-team single-elimination tournament consisted of three rounds based on seeding from regular season conference play. The defending champions were the Georgetown Hoyas. They were unable to defend their title despite being the first overall seed and regular season champions. Creighton finished as tournament champions after defeating Georgetown 3–0 in the final. This is the first Big East title in program history for Creighton, and the first for head coach Johnny Torres. As tournament champions, Creighton earned the Big East's automatic place in the 2022 NCAA Division I men's soccer tournament.

== Seeding ==
The top six teams in the regular season earned a spot in the 2022 tournament. Teams were seeded based on regular season conference record and tiebreakers were used to determine seedings of teams that finished with the same record.

Seed	School	Conference record	Points
1	Georgetown	8–1–1	25
2	Seton Hall	4–1–5	17
3	Xavier	3–1–6	15
4	Butler	4–3–3	15
5	Providence	3–2–5	14
6	Creighton	3–3–4	13

== Bracket ==
First round Saturday, Nov. 5
4	Butler	3
5	Providence	0
3	Xavier	1
6	Creighton	2

Semifinals; Thursday, Nov. 10
1	Georgetown (a.e.t.)	2
4	Butler	1
2	Seton Hall	0
6	Creighton	6

Final; Sunday, Nov. 13
1	Georgetown	0
6	Creighton	3

== Schedule ==
=== First Round ===
November 5	#3 Xavier	1–2	#6 Creighton	Cincinnati, OH
7:00 p.m. ET	Ernest Mensah (yellow card) 34'; Bernal de la Garza 64'; George Waites (yellow card) 69'; Loten Ben Dov (yellow card) 76'	Report	35' (pen.), (yellow card) 77' Giorgio Probo; 66' Dunacn McGuire; (yellow card) 89' Charles Auguste	Stadium: Corcoran Field; Attendance: 467; Referee: Izlen Peksenar; Assistant referees: Kyle Maust; Chad Collins; Fourth official: Michael Samour

November 5	#4 Butler	3–0	#5 Providence	Indianapolis, IN
7:00 p.m. ET	Palmer Ault 13', 68'; DJ Hooks 25'	Report	(yellow card) 75' Gil Santos; (yellow card) 75' Brendan McSorley; (yellow card) 77' Team; (yellow card) 78'Ramzi Qawasmy	Stadium: Sellick Bowl; Attendance: 616; Referee: Sorin Stoica; Assistant referees: Dean Morgan; Johann Pedolzky; Fourth official: William DeLois

=== Semifinals ===
November 10	#2 Seton Hall	0–6	#6 Creighton	Boyds, MD
4:00 p.m. ET	Tomas Nunez (yellow card) 18'; Konstantin Donalies (yellow card) 73'	Report	(yellow card) 21' Callum Watson; (yellow card) 32' Alejandro Maillet; 34' (pen.), 47', 57', 60' Duncan McGuire; (yellow card) 55' Owen O'Malley; 62' Jackson Castro; 77' Mark O'Neill	Stadium: Maryland SoccerPlex; Attendance: 247; Referee: Stephen Foster; Assistant referees: Dustin Killick; Mark Remsa; Fourth official: Peter Dhima

November 10	#1 Georgetown	2–1 (a.e.t.)	#4 Butler	Boyds, MD
6:30 p.m. ET	Jack Panayotou 22', 96'; Miles Avery (yellow card) 34'; Jacob Murrell (yellow card) 106'	Report	77' DJ Hooks	Stadium: Maryland SoccerPlex; Attendance: 1,053; Referee: Sergio Gonzalez; Assistant referees: Jeffrey Skinker; Mathew Richardson; Fourth official: Jordan Gray

=== Final ===
November 13	#1 Georgetown	0–3	#6 Creighton	Boyds, MD
11:30 a.m. ET	Maximus Jennings (yellow card) 51'	Report	10' Alejandro Maillet; (yellow card) 22' Owen O'Malley; 48' Duncan McGuire; 49' Giorgio Probo; (yellow card) 68' Charles Auguste; (yellow card) 80' Diego Dutilh	Stadium: Maryland SoccerPlex; Attendance: 1,147; Referee: Mark Kadlecik; Assistant referees: Rob Fereday; Matthew Richardson; Fourth official: Balvir Cabrera Garcia

== Statistics ==
=== Goalscorers ===
There were 18 goals scored in 5 matches, for an average of 3.6 goals per match.

6 goals

- Duncan McGuire – Creighton

2 goals

- Palmer Ault – Butler
- DJ Hooks – Butler
- Giorgio Probo – Creighton
- Jack Panayotou – Georgetown

1 goal

- Jackson Castro – Creighton
- Alejandro Maillet – Creighton
- Mark O'Niell – Creighton
- Bernal de la Garza – Xavier

== All-Tournament team ==
Player	Team
Perrin Barnes	Butler
DJ Hooks	Butler
JP Marin	Seton Hall
Mattias Almeida Sundell	Seton Hall
Daniel Wu	Georgetown
Aidan Rocha	Georgetown
Jack Panayotou	Georgetown
Duncan McGuire*	Creighton
Paul Kruse^	Creighton
Giorgio Probo	Creighton
Alejandro Maillet	Creighton

* Offensive MVP
^ Defensive MVP
