= 2023 MLS SuperDraft =

College draft for soccer teams

General information
- Sport: Soccer
- Date: December 21, 2022
- Time: 1:00 p.m.
- Network: Twitch

Overview
- 83 total selections in 3 rounds
- League: Major League Soccer
- Teams: 29
- First selection: Hamady Diop, Charlotte FC

The 2023 MLS SuperDraft was the 24th edition of the SuperDraft conducted by Major League Soccer. It was held on December 21, 2022, becoming the first SuperDraft to be held in December, but retained the 2023 branding. The draft was conducted via conference call and streamed online. Previously, the SuperDraft had been held in conjunction with the annual January United Soccer Coaches convention.

Since 2021, the SuperDraft has consisted of three rounds. Teams that received fourth-round picks for this draft via past trades received compensatory picks instead. The first overall pick is awarded to expansion team St. Louis City SC and the remaining picks are set by 2022 regular season and post-season results in reverse order.

== Format ==
The SuperDraft format has remained constant throughout its history and closely resembles that of the NFL draft:

1. Any expansion teams receive the first picks. MLS announced that St. Louis City SC would debut in 2023 instead of 2022, and the league's expansion to Sacramento was put on hiatus indefinitely.
2. Non-playoff clubs receive the next picks in reverse order of prior season finish.
3. Teams that made the MLS Cup Playoffs are then ordered by which round of the playoffs they are eliminated.
4. The winners of the MLS Cup are given the last selection, and the losers the penultimate selection.

== Player selection ==
Player key
| * | Denotes player who has been selected for an MLS Best XI team | | | | | | |
| ^ | Member of 2023 Generation Adidas class | | | | | | |
| † | Player who was named to an MLS Best XI and Generation Adidas | | | | | | |
Signed key
| 28 | Denotes player who signed for a MLS team (Division I) | | | | | | |
| 4 | Denotes player who signed for a USL Championship team (Division II) | | | | | | |
| 38 | Denotes player who signed for a MLS Next Pro, USL League One or NISA team (Division III) | | | | | | |
| 3 | Denotes player who signed for a team outside the United States soccer league system | | | | | | |
| 7 | Denotes player who returned to college team | | | | | | |
Positions key
| GK | Goalkeeper | DF | Defender | MF | Midfielder | FW | Forward |

=== Round 1 ===
| P | MLS team | Player | Pos. | College | Conference | Academy team(s) | Other team(s) | Signed |
|---|---|---|---|---|---|---|---|---|
| 1 | Charlotte FC (Note: No. 1: St. Louis City → Charlotte. December 21, 2022: Charlotte acquired St. Louis City SC's first-round selection in exchange for $400,000 in General Allocation Money and their No. 20 MLS SuperDraft pick.) | (Senegal) Hamady Diop | DF | Clemson | ACC | SIMA Águilas | —N/a | (United States) Charlotte FC |
| 2 | Orlando City SC (Note: No. 2: D.C. United → Orlando. December 21, 2022: Orlando acquired D.C. United's first-round selection in exchange for Ruan.) | (Ghana) Shak Mohammed | FW | Duke | ACC | Right to Dream Academy; Black Rock FC | Manhattan SC | (United States) Orlando City SC |
| 3 | Colorado Rapids (Note: No. 3: Toronto → Colorado. July 8, 2022: Colorado acquired Toronto FC's first-round selection and Ralph Priso in exchange for $1,025,000 in general allocation money, and Mark-Anthony Kaye.) | (Canada) Moïse Bombito | DF | New Hampshire | America East | CS Saint-Hubert | Seacoast United Phantoms | (United States) Colorado Rapids |
| 4 | New England Revolution (Note: No. 4: San Jose → New England. December 21, 2022: New England acquired San Jose Earthquakes's first-round selection in exchange for $250,000 in General Allocation Money and their No. 10 MLS SuperDraft pick.) | (Ghana) Joshua Bolma | MF | Maryland | Big Ten | Rising Stars Academy; Black Rock FC | Ocean City Nor'easters; Westchester Flames | (United States) New England Revolution |
| 5 | Vancouver Whitecaps FC (Note: No. 5: Houston → Vancouver. December 21, 2022: Vancouver acquired Houston Dynamo FC's first-round selection in exchange for $225,000 in General Allocation Money and their No. 13 MLS SuperDraft pick.) | (Cameroon) J.C. Ngando | MF | UNC Greensboro | SoCon | Amiens; Paris FC | South Georgia Tormenta FC 2 | (Canada) Vancouver Whitecaps FC |
| 6 | Orlando City SC (Note: No. 6: Chicago → Orlando. May 5, 2022: Orlando acquired Chicago Fire FC's first-round selection and discovery rights to Chris Mueller in exchange for $250,000 in 2022 general allocation money, and $250,000 in 2023 in general allocation money, and discovery prior for an unnamed player.) | (United States) Duncan McGuire | FW | Creighton | Big East | Elkhorn SC | Lane United FC | (United States) Orlando City SC |
| 7 | Real Salt Lake (Note: No. 7: Atlanta → Salt Lake. December 21, 2022: Real Salt Lake acquired Atlanta United FC's first-round selection in exchange for $175,000 in General Allocation Money.) | (United States) Ilijah Paul | FW | Washington | Pac-12 | Valparaiso United; Real Salt Lake; Phoenix Rising FC; Barca Residency Academy | FC Tucson; Crossfire Redmond | (United States) Real Salt Lake |
| 8 | Sporting Kansas City | (Canada) Stephen Afrifa | FW | FIU | American | Woodbridge Strikers | One Knoxville SC | (United States) Sporting Kansas City |
| 9 | St. Louis City SC (Note: No. 9: Seattle → St. Louis. December 21, 2022: St. Louis City acquired Seattle Sounders FC's first-round selection in exchange for $175,000 in General Allocation Money and the no. 59 pick in the 2023 MLS SuperDraft.) | (United States) Owen O'Malley | MF | Creighton | Big East | North Carolina FC | Boston Bolts; Vermont Green FC | (United States) St. Louis City SC |
| 10 | San Jose Earthquakes (Note: No. 10: New England → San Jose. December 21, 2022: San Jose acquired New England Revolution's first-round selection as part of the No.4 pick trade.) | (United States) Daniel Munie | DF | Indiana | Big Ten | Saint Louis FC | St. Louis Scott Gallagher SC | (United States) San Jose Earthquakes |
| 11 | Nashville SC (Note: No. 11: Charlotte → Nashville. December 12, 2021: Nashville exercised the right to swap Charlotte FC's first-round selection in exchange for two international roster spots and Charlotte sending $500,000 allocation to Nashville.) | (United States) Joey Skinner | DF | Clemson | ACC | Charlotte Independence | Charlotte Independence 2 | (United States) Nashville SC |
| 12 | Charlotte FC (Note: No. 12: Colorado → Charlotte. December 21, 2022: Charlotte acquired Colorado Rapids No. 12 pick in exchange for $50,000 in 2023 GAM, $50,000 in conditional GAM, and a first round pick in the 2024 MLS SuperDraft.) | (United States) Patrick Agyemang | FW | Rhode Island | A-10 | Hartford Hellions | Western Mass Pioneers | (United States) Charlotte FC |
| 13 | Austin FC (Note: No. 13: Vancouver → Houston → Austin. December 21, 2022: Houston acquired Vancouver Whitecaps FC's first-round selection as part of the No.5 pick trade. It was subsequently traded to Austin FC in exchange for $100,000 in General Allocation Money (50,000 in 2023 General Allocation Money (GAM), and $50k in 2024 GAM) and the No. 27 pick in the 2023 MLS SuperDraft.) | (United States) CJ Fodrey | FW | San Diego State | Pac-12 | Albion SC; San Diego Surf; San Diego Nomads; LA Galaxy | San Diego Loyal SC | (United States) Austin FC |
| 14 | Columbus Crew | (United States) Maximilian Arfsten | FW | UC Davis | Big West | California Odyssey | San Jose Earthquakes II | (United States) Columbus Crew |
| 15 | Portland Timbers | (Germany) Noel Caliskan | MF | Loyola Marymount | West Coast | 1. FC Köln; Fortuna Düsseldorf | Flint City Bucks; SpVg Frechen 20 | (United States) Portland Timbers 2 |
| 16 | Real Salt Lake | (France) Bertin Jacquesson | FW | Pittsburgh | ACC | Strasbourg | —N/a | (United States) Real Salt Lake |
| 17 | Orlando City SC | (Somalia) Abdi Salim | DF | Syracuse | ACC | Delaware SC; Empire United | Ocean City Nor'easters | (United States) Orlando City SC |
| 18 | Inter Miami CF | (United States) Cole Jensen | GK | Xavier | Big East | Elkhorn SC | —N/a | (United States) Inter Miami CF |
| 19 | Minnesota United FC | (South Sudan) Ryen Jiba | DF | SLCC | NJCAA | Sparta United | Park City Red Wolves SC; Union Omaha | (United States) Minnesota United FC |
| 20 | Austin FC (Note: No. 20: Nashville → Charlotte → St. Louis City → Austin. November 9, 2022: Charlotte acquired Nashville SC's first-round selection in a swap of first round picks from a December 12, 2021 trade, St. Louis acquired the No. 20 pick from Charlotte in exchange for $400,000 GAM and the No. 1 Pick. Austin acquired the No. 20 pick from St. Louis in exchange for $50,000 General Allocation Money and conditional General Allocation Money.) | (France) Valentin Noël | MF | Pittsburgh | ACC | Chamois Niortais | —N/a | (United States) Austin FC II |
| 21 | New York Red Bulls | (United States) Elian Haddock | GK | Yale | Ivy | Bavarian SC | —N/a | |
| 22 | FC Cincinnati | (United States) Joey Akpunonu | DF | Bowling Green | MAC | Pacesetter SC | Toledo Villa FC | (United States) FC Cincinnati |
| 23 | LA Galaxy | (Costa Rica) Gino Vivi | FW | Central Florida | AAC | Deportivo Saprissa | —N/a | (United States) LA Galaxy |
| 24 | FC Dallas | (United States) Herbert Endeley | FW | Indiana | Big Ten | Minneapolis United | Minneapolis City SC | (United States) FC Dallas |
| 25 | Real Salt Lake (Note: No. 25: Montréal → Salt Lake. December 21, 2022: Salt Lake acquired CF Montréal's first-round selection as part of the trade for Aaron Herrera.) | (United States) Emeka Eneli | FW | Cornell | Ivy | Columbus Crew; Ohio Premier | Lionsbridge FC; Flint City Bucks | (United States) Real Salt Lake |
| 26 | New York City FC | (Canada) Malcolm Johnston | MF | Maryland | Big Ten | Vaughan Azzurri | Vaughan Azzurri | (Canada) Whitecaps FC 2 |
| 27 | Columbus Crew (Note: No. 27: Austin → Houston → Columbus. December 21, 2022: Columbus acquired the pick from Houston for $50,000 of General Allocation Money.) | (United States) Xavier Zengue | DF | Dayton | A-10 | St. Paul Blackhawks; Minnesota Thunder | Minneapolis City SC | (United States) Columbus Crew 2 |
| 28 | Philadelphia Union | (United States) Holden Trent | GK | High Point | Big South | Carolina Rapids; NC Fusion; Charlotte Independence | South Georgia Tormenta FC 2 | (United States) Philadelphia Union |
| 29 | Vancouver Whitecaps FC (Note: No. 29: Los Angeles FC → Vancouver. December 14, 2021: Vancouver acquired Los Angeles FC's first-round selection and Tristan Blackmon in exchange for $350,000 in General Allocation Money.) | (Canada) Levonte Johnson | FW | Syracuse | ACC | Master's FA | Capital FC; Chicago FC United | (Canada) Whitecaps FC 2 |

=== Round 2 ===
| P | MLS team | Player | Pos. | College | Conference | Academy team | Other team | Signed |
|---|---|---|---|---|---|---|---|---|
| 30 | St. Louis City SC | (United States) John Klein | MF | Saint Louis | A-10 | Portland Timbers | Portland Timbers 2 Chicago FC United; St. Louis Scott Gallagher SC; Kaw Valley FC | (United States) St. Louis City 2 |
| 31 | D.C. United | (United States) Ben Stitz | MF | Penn | Ivy | Baltimore Celtic | FC Baltimore Christos | (United States) FC Cincinnati 2 |
| 32 | Toronto FC | (Canada) Jalen Watson | DF | Penn State | Big Ten | Erin Mills SC; Vancouver Whitecaps FC | —N/a | (Canada) Toronto FC II |
| 33 | San Jose Earthquakes | (Guyana) Liam Butts | FW | Penn State | Big Ten | Gwinnett Soccer Academy; Atlanta United FC | East Atlanta FC | (United States) Penn State |
| 34 | Houston Dynamo FC | (United States) Isaiah Reid | FW | Clemson | ACC | Charlotte Soccer Academy | —N/a | (United States) Houston Dynamo 2 |
| 35 | Nashville SC (Note: No. 35: Chicago → Nashville. November 9, 2022: Nashville acquired Chicago Fire FC's natural second-round selection and $175,000 in General Allocation Money in exchange for an international roster slot.) | (United States) Sean Suber | DF | Charlotte | American | Carolina Rapids | —N/a | (United States) Huntsville City FC |
| 36 | Atlanta United FC | (United States) Tyler Young | MF | Campbell | Big South | Carolina Rapids | Charlotte Eagles | (United States) Atlanta United 2 |
| 37 | Sporting Kansas City | (United States) Chris Rindov | DF | Maryland | Big Ten | Olney Soccer | —N/a | (United States) Sporting Kansas City |
| 38 | Seattle Sounders FC | (Norway) Eythor Björgolfsson | FW | Kentucky | Sun Belt | Ull/Kisa; Nardo FK | Vermont Green FC | (United States) Tacoma Defiance |
| 39 | New England Revolution | (United States) Victor Souza | DF | Boston College | ACC | Met Oval; New York City FC | Lionsbridge FC | (United States) New England Revolution II |
| 40 | Charlotte FC | (United States) Nick Scardina | FW | Washington | Pac-12 | Portland Timbers | PDX FC; Crossfire Redmond | (United States) Charlotte FC |
| 41 | Colorado Rapids | (Germany) Oliver Semmle | GK | Marshall | Sun Belt | FC Rastatt 04; Karlsruher SC | —N/a | (United States) Louisville City FC |
| 42 | Vancouver Whitecaps FC | (Canada) Daniel Nimick | DF | Western Michigan | MAC | Leeds United; Harrogate Town | Grand Rapids FC; South Bend Lions | (Canada) HFX Wanderers FC |
| 43 | Columbus Crew | (United States) Clay Holstad | MF | Kentucky | Sun Belt | Birmingham United | Dalton Red Wolves SC | (United States) Columbus Crew 2 |
| 44 | Portland Timbers | (United States) Ryan Bilichuk | GK | Elon | CAA | D.C. United; Barca Residency Academy | Greenville FC; Asheville City SC | (United States) Portland Timbers 2 |
| 45 | Real Salt Lake | (Costa Rica) Amferny Sinclair | MF | Syracuse | ACC | Alajuelense; Once de Abril | Reading United; FC Buffalo; One Knoxville SC | (United States) Real Monarchs |
| 46 | Orlando City SC | (Germany) Luis Grassow | DF | Kentucky | Sun Belt | TSV Neuried; SpVgg Unterhaching; SV Planegg-Krailling | FC Pipinsried; SSV Ulm 1846; TSV Neuried; Ocean City Nor'easters | Retired |
| 47 | Inter Miami CF | (Senegal) Bachir Ndiaye | MF | UNC Wilmington | CAA | Onslow Classic | Asheville City SC | (United States) Charlotte Independence |
| 48 | Minnesota United FC | (Nigeria) Emmanuel Iwe | MF | St. Cloud State | NSIC | Joy Athletic Club | Joy St. Louis Park; Minnesota United FC 2 | (United States) Minnesota United FC 2 |
| 49 | Nashville SC | (Estonia) Alex Meinhard | FW | Tulsa | AAC | Santos Tartu | Santos Tartu | (United States) Clemson |
| 50 | New York Red Bulls | (United States) Ethan Conley | DF | UNC Greensboro | SoCon | Sockers FC Chicago | North Carolina Fusion U23 | (United States) UNC Greensboro |
| 51 | FC Cincinnati | (United States) Hunter Morse | GK | Western Michigan | MAC | Michigan Wolves | Detroit City FC; Kalamazoo FC | (United States) FC Cincinnati 2 |
| 52 | LA Galaxy | (United States) Russell Shealy | GK | Syracuse | ACC | Darlington Academy; Concorde Fire; Atlanta United FC | Georgia Revolution FC; Reading United | (United States) Crown Legacy FC |
| 53 | FC Dallas | (United States) Ryan Wittenbrink | FW | Indiana | Big Ten | FC United; Libertyville FC 1974 | Chicago FC United | (United States) Northern Colorado Hailstorm FC |
| 54 | CF Montréal | (United States) Milo Garvanian | DF | North Carolina | ACC | Rio Rapids SC; Colorado Rapids | South Georgia Tormenta FC 2 Tennessee SC | (United States) New Mexico United |
| 55 | New York City FC | (Guinea-Bissau) Braudílio Rodrigues | FW | Franklin Pierce | NE-10 | Odivelas; Benfica; AD Oeiras; Os Belenenses; Real | Sintra; Western Mass Pioneers | (United States) Tacoma Defiance |
| 56 | Austin FC | (United States) Jackson Wälti | MF | Pittsburgh | ACC | SIMA Águilas | —N/a | (United States) Austin FC II |
| 57 | Philadelphia Union | (United States) Stefan Stojanovic | FW | Georgetown | Big East | Sockers FC Chicago | Chicago FC United; Philadelphia Union II | (United States) Philadelphia Union II |
| 58 | Los Angeles FC | (Czech Republic) Jassem Koleilat | GK | New Hampshire | America East | Laval; Sparta Prague | Seacoast United Phantoms | (United States) Los Angeles FC 2 |

=== Round 3 ===
| P | MLS team | Player | Pos. | College | Conference | Academy team | Other team | Signed |
|---|---|---|---|---|---|---|---|---|
| 59 | Seattle Sounders FC (Note: No. 59: St. Louis → Seattle. December 21, 2022: Seattle acquired the No. 59 pick from St. Louis City SC as part of the earlier No. 9 pick trade.) | (United States) Blake Bowen | DF | San Diego State | Pac-12 | OC Surf | —N/a | (United States) Tacoma Defiance |
| 60 | D.C. United | (United States) Aidan Rocha | MF | Georgetown | Big East | Bethesda SC | —N/a | (United States) Loudoun United FC |
| 61 | Toronto FC | (United States) Charlie Sharp | FW | Western Michigan | MAC | Michigan Wolves | Flint City Bucks; Seacoast United Phantoms | (United States) Western Michigan |
| 62 | San Jose Earthquakes | (United States) Hunter George | FW | Maryland | Big Ten | Sacramento Republic FC | —N/a | |
| 63 | Houston Dynamo FC | (Haiti) Frantz Pierrot | FW | Connecticut | Big East | Seacoast United Phantoms; FC Westchester | Reading United; Boston Bolts; Seacoast United Phantoms | (Republic of Ireland) Athlone Town |
| 64 | Chicago Fire FC | (United States) Noah Egan | DF | Vermont | America East | Strikers FC Irvine | Magia FA | (United States) Chicago Fire II |
| 65 | Nashville SC (Note: No. 65: Atlanta → Nashville. June 22, 2022: Nashville acquired Atlanta United FC's natural third-round selection and $175,000 in General Allocation Money in exchange for an international roster slot.) | (United States) Makel Rasheed | DF | Xavier | Big East | McLean Soccer | Asheville City SC | (United States) Xavier |
| 66 | New York City FC (Note: No. 66: Kansas City → New York City FC. June 22, 2022: New York City FC acquired Sporting Kansas City's natural third-round selection.) | (United States) MD Myers | FW | Rutgers | Big Ten | Philadelphia Union | Ocean City Nor'easters | (United States) New York City FC II |
| 67 | Chicago Fire FC (Note: No. 67: Seattle → Chicago. February 14, 2022: Chicago acquired Seattle Sounders FC's natural third-round selection in exchange for the College Protected Period Priority for Jackson Ragen.) | (United States) Billy Hency | MF | Loyola-Chicago | A-10 | Sporting STL | Chicago FC United | (United States) Chicago Fire II |
| 68 | New England Revolution | (Norway) Andreas Ueland | DF | Virginia | ACC | Bryne FK | —N/a | (United States) Chicago Fire II |
| 69 | Charlotte FC | (United States) Andrew Privett | MF | Penn State | Big Ten | Baltimore Armour | Christos FC | (United States) Charlotte FC |
| 70 | Colorado Rapids | PASS | —N/a | —N/a | —N/a | —N/a | —N/a | —N/a |
| 71 | Vancouver Whitecaps FC | (Sweden) Buster Sjöberg | DF | Syracuse | ACC | IFK Uppsala; IK Sirius | Gamla Upsala SK; One Knoxville SC | (United States) Syracuse |
| 72 | Austin FC (Note: No. 72: Columbus → Austin. December 23, 2021: Austin acquired Columbus Crew's natural third-round selection in exchange for switching draft positions in the 2022 MLS Re-Entry Draft.) | (Canada) Salvatore Mazzaferro | DF | South Florida | AAC | Toronto FC | South Georgia Tormenta FC 2 | (United States) Austin FC II |
| 73 | Portland Timbers | (United States) Jaden Jones-Riley | DF | Dayton | A-10 | —N/a | Tallahassee SC; One Knoxville SC | (United States) Portland Timbers 2 |
| 74 | Real Salt Lake | (Ghana) Moses Mensah | DF | Campbell | Big South | WA All Stars | Des Moines Menace; One Knoxville SC | (United States) Birmingham Legion FC |
| 75 | CF Montréal (Note: No. 75: Orlando → Montréal. January 25, 2022: Montréal acquired Orlando City SC's natural third-round selection and $200,000 in General Allocation Money in exchange for an international roster slot.) | (United States) Ousman Jabang | DF | Mercer | SoCon | Georgia Soccer; Atlanta United FC | Georgia Revolution FC | (Canada) CF Montréal |
| 76 | Chicago Fire FC (Note: No. 76: Miami → Chicago. January 25, 2022: Chicago acquired Inter Miami CF's natural third-round selection.) | (Colombia) Wilmer Cabrera Jr. | FW | Butler | Big East | Colorado Rapids; IMG Academy; Houston Dynamo FC | Brazos Valley Cavalry FC; Rio Grande Valley FC | (Colombia) Real Cartagena |
| 77 | LA Galaxy (Note: No. 77: Minnesota → LA Galaxy. November 7, 2022: LA Galaxy acquired Minnesota United FC's natural third-round selection and $75,000 in General Allocation Money in exchange for Cameron Dunbar.) | PASS | —N/a | —N/a | —N/a | —N/a | —N/a | —N/a |
| 78 | Nashville SC | (United States) Rory O'Driscoll | MF | New Hampshire | America East | Minneapolis United; Minnesota Thunder | North Carolina Fusion U23; Minneapolis City SC | (United States) Minnesota United FC 2 |
| 79 | New York Red Bulls | (United States) Amos Shapiro-Thompson | MF | Boston College | ACC | New England Revolution; Dinamo Zagreb; Legia Warsaw | Western Mass Pioneers | (United States) New York Red Bulls II |
| 80 | FC Cincinnati | (United States) London Aghedo | DF | Air Force | WAC | Real SoCal | —N/a | (United States) FC Cincinnati |
| 81 | LA Galaxy | PASS | —N/a | —N/a | —N/a | —N/a | —N/a | —N/a |
| 82 | FC Dallas | (Jamaica) Kameron Lacey | FW | Charlotte | AAC | Miramar United; SIMA Águilas; FC Dallas; Orlando City SC | Asheville City SC | (United States) Minnesota United FC 2 |
| 83 | CF Montréal | (Canada) Nick Christoffersen | GK | Penn | Ivy | Toronto FC | Toronto FC II; West Chester United SC; Vermont Green FC | (United States) Penn |
| 84 | Nashville SC (Note: No. 84: NYCFC → Nashville. November 17, 2022: Nashville acquired New York City FC's natural third-round selection/) | (Switzerland) Lyam MacKinnon | FW | Villanova | Big East | Lausanne-Sport | Reading United; West Chester United SC | (United States) Greenville Triumph SC |
| 85 | Portland Timbers (Note: No. 85: Austin → Portland. November 7, 2022: Austin acquired Portland Timbers's natural third-round selection/) | (United States) Tyler Clegg | DF | James Madison | Sun Belt | Evergreen Hammers | Evergreen FC; Northern Virginia FC; Asheville City SC | (United States) Portland Timbers 2 |
| 86 | Philadelphia Union | PASS | —N/a | —N/a | —N/a | —N/a | —N/a | —N/a |
| 87 | Los Angeles FC | (Dominican Republic) Noah Dollenmayer | DF | Cal State San Bernardino | CCAA | Sporting San Fernando | FC Golden State Force | (United States) Los Angeles FC 2 |

=== Round 4 ===
Compensatory pick for a trade done before the SuperDraft was downsized to only three rounds.

| P | MLS team | Player | Pos. | College | Conference | Academy team | Other team | Signed |
|---|---|---|---|---|---|---|---|---|
| 88 | Portland Timbers (Note: No. 88: Salt Lake → Portland. June 9, 2020: Portland acquired Real Salt Lake's pick via trade for Ryan Sierakowski) | PASS | —N/a | —N/a | —N/a | —N/a | —N/a | —N/a |

== Notable undrafted players ==
=== Homegrown players ===
| Original MLS team | Player | Position | College | Conference | Notes | Ref. |
|---|---|---|---|---|---|---|
| Seattle Sounders FC | (United States) Jacob Castro | GK | San Diego State | Pac-12 | | |
| New York Red Bulls | (United States) Jayden Reid | DF | Connecticut | Big East | | |

=== Eligible players who signed outside of MLS in 2023 ===
This is a list of eligible players who signed in leagues outside of MLS prior to the SuperDraft, but were still draft eligible.

| Player | Nat. | Position | College | Conference | Team | League | Notes | Ref. |
|---|---|---|---|---|---|---|---|---|
| Nathan Opoku | (Ghana) | FW | Syracuse | ACC | Leicester City | Premier League | | |

=== Other notable players ===
| Original MLS Team | Player | Pos | Affiliation | Played in MLS | Notes |
|---|---|---|---|---|---|
| Houston Dynamo FC | (Haiti) Charles Auguste | MF | Creighton | 2023– | |

== Summary ==
=== Selections by college athletic conference ===
| Conference | Round 1 | Round 2 | Round 3 | Total |
NCAA Division I conferences
| ACC | 7 | 6 | 3 | 16 |
| America East | 1 | 1 | 2 | 5 |
| American | 1 | 2 | 2 | 5 |
| Atlantic 10 | 2 | 1 | 2 | 5 |
| Big East | 3 | 1 | 5 | 9 |
| Big South | 1 | 1 | 1 | 3 |
| Big Ten | 4 | 4 | 3 | 11 |
| Big West | 1 | 0 | 0 | 1 |
| Colonial | 0 | 2 | 0 | 2 |
| Ivy | 2 | 1 | 1 | 4 |
| MAC | 1 | 2 | 1 | 4 |
| Pac-12 | 2 | 1 | 1 | 4 |
| SoCon | 1 | 1 | 1 | 3 |
| Sun Belt | 1 | 4 | 1 | 6 |
| WAC | 0 | 0 | 1 | 1 |
| West Coast | 1 | 0 | 0 | 1 |
Non-Division I conferences
| CCAA | 0 | 0 | 1 | 1 |
| Northeast-10 | 0 | 1 | 0 | 1 |
| NSIC | 0 | 1 | 0 | 1 |
| NJCAA | 1 | 0 | 0 | 1 |
Passes
| Passes | 0 | 0 | 4 | 4 |

=== Schools with multiple draft selections ===
| Selections | Schools |
|---|---|
| 5 | Syracuse |
| 4 | Maryland |
| 3 | Clemson, Indiana, Kentucky, New Hampshire, Penn State, Pittsburgh, Western Michigan |
| 2 | Creighton, Dayton, Georgetown, Penn, San Diego State, UNC Greensboro, Washington |

== 2023 SuperDraft trades ==
Round 1

Round 2

Round 3

Compensatory picks
