= Diego Castro =

Diego Castro may refer to:

- Diego Castro (Spanish footballer) (born 1982), Spanish former footballer
- Diego Castro (Chilean footballer) (born 1961), Chilean former footballer
- Diego Castro (politician) (born 1992), Brazilian politician
- Diego Castro III (born 1975), Filipino actor and broadcaster
