= 2014 Big East Conference men's soccer season =

Big East Conference
- Season: 2014
- Champions: TBD
- NCAA Tournament: TBD

The 2014 Big East Conference men's soccer season was the second soccer season for the recently realigned Big East Conference. Including the history of the original Big East Conference, this was the 19th season of men's soccer under the "Big East Conference" name.

The defending champions were the Marquette Golden Eagles who defeated the Providence Friars by a score of 3 – 2 in the 2013 Big East Men's Soccer Tournament final. The Creighton Bluejays claimed the 2014 Big East Conference Regular Season Championship after defeating Providence by a score of 3 – 0 on November 7, 2014, and posting a conference record of 7 wins, 1 loss, and 1 tie. The 2014 Big East Men's Soccer Tournament was won by the Providence Friars who defeated the Xavier Musketeers in the Big East final.

== Teams ==
=== Stadia and locations ===
Team	Location	Stadium	Capacity
Butler Bulldogs	Indianapolis, Indiana	Butler Bowl	7,500
Creighton Bluejays	Omaha, Nebraska	Morrison Stadium	6,000
DePaul Blue Demons	Chicago, Illinois	Cacciatore Stadium	1,200
Georgetown Hoyas	Washington, D.C.	Shaw Field	2,000
Marquette Golden Eagles	Milwaukee, Wisconsin	Valley Fields	1,600
Providence Friars	Providence, Rhode Island	Glay Field	3,000
St. John's Red Storm	Jamaica, New York	Belson Stadium	2,168
Seton Hall Pirates	South Orange, New Jersey	Owen T. Carroll Field	1,800
Villanova Wildcats	Villanova, Pennsylvania	Villanova Soccer Complex	1,000
Xavier Musketeers	Cincinnati, Ohio	XU Soccer Complex	1,500

== Standings ==
2014 Big East Conference men's soccer standings
	Conf.					Overall
Team	W		L		T	W		L		T
No. 7 Creighton +	7	–	1	–	1	16	–	3	–	3
No. 13 Xavier +	6	–	1	–	2	15	–	6	–	2
No. 5 Georgetown +	6	–	2	–	1	14	–	4	–	5
No. 3 Providence ‡	5	–	2	–	2	16	–	5	–	2
Villanova	3	–	4	–	2	8	–	8	–	3
Marquette	2	–	3	–	4	8	–	6	–	4
Seton Hall	2	–	4	–	3	5	–	7	–	5
Butler	2	–	5	–	2	6	–	7	–	5
DePaul	1	–	6	–	2	4	–	10	–	4
Saint John's	1	–	7	–	1	4	–	10	–	4
‡ - Tournament champion +- Invited to the NCAA Division I Men's Soccer Championship; As of December 16, 2014; Rankings from NSCAA

== Tournament ==
Held from November 11–16, 2014 at PPL Park in Chester, Pennsylvania, the 2014 Big East Men's Soccer Tournament determined the Big East Conference Champion, and the conference's automatic berth into the 2014 NCAA Division I Men's Soccer Championship. Seeding for the tournament is based on regular season conference records. The participating teams according to seed were: #1 Creighton, #2 Xavier, #3 Georgetown, #4 Providence, #5 Villanova, and #6 Marquette. The Tournament was won by Providence who defeated Xavier in the Big East final.

== Results ==
Home/Away	BUT	CRE	DPU	GEO	MAQ	PRO	STJ	SET	VIL	XU
Butler Bulldogs	—	—	—	0–2	1–0	2–0	—	0–0	—	—
Creighton Bluejays	2–1	—	—	0–1	2–0	3–0	—	3–2	—	—
DePaul Blue Demons	0–0 2OT	1–2	—	0–2	—	—	—	3–1	—	—
Georgetown Hoyas	—	—	—	—	0–0	0–2	1–0	—	—	1–0
Marquette Golden Eagles	—	—	4–0	—	—	1–1	2–0	—	1–1	0–1
Providence Friars	—	—	2–1	—	—	—	3–2	—	2–1	0–0
St. John's Red Storm	3–2	0–1	1–1	—	—	—	—	0–1	0–2	—
Seton Hall Pirates	—	—	—	1–0	3–3	0–3	—	—	—	1–3
Villanova Wildcats	1–0	0–1	4–0	2–1	—	—	—	1–1	—	—
Xavier Musketeers	2–0	1–1 2OT	2–0	—	—	—	1–0	—	3–0	—
