= Bret Simon =

American soccer coach

Personal information
- Full name: Bret Simon
- Date of birth: June 19, 1958 (age 68)

College career
Years	Team	Apps	(Gls)
1980	UMass Minutemen		

Managerial career
- 1982–1986: Berry Vikings (assistant)
- 1986–1992: Berry Vikings
- 1993–1994: Creighton Bluejays (assistant)
- 1995–2000: Creighton Bluejays
- 2001–2011: Stanford Cardinal

Bret Simon (born June 19, 1958) is an American former soccer coach. He last served as the head men's soccer coach at Stanford University. He held the position from 2001 to 2011, replacing Bobby Clark. He has posted a 68–63–2 (.519) record in eight seasons at the helm. He has guided the Cardinal to two Final Four appearances, as well as a Pacific-10 conference title. His overall career record stands at 247–132–50. From 2001 to 2002, Stanford went 36–7–4, equaling the best two-year stretch in program history. In 2001, he was named NSCAA Far West Regional Coach of the Year, as well as Pac-10 coach of the year, going 19–2–1.

He resigned after the 2011 season.

He previously served as the head men's soccer coach at Creighton University from 1995 to 2000. He led the Bluejays to a 96–28–8 (.769) record during his tenure. His winning percentage ranks him number 1 all time in school history. He led Creighton to the 2000 Final Four during his final season there. He earned four Missouri Valley Conference coach of the year awards during his tenure. He led Creighton to six NCAA tournament appearances, including four Missouri Valley Conference tournament championships and two Missouri Valley Conference regular season championships.
