= Don Klosterman (soccer) =

American soccer coach

Personal information
- Place of birth: St. Louis, Missouri, United States
- Position: Defender

College career
Years	Team	Apps	(Gls)
1975–1978	Benedictine Ravens		

Managerial career
- 1979–1983: Benedictine Ravens
- 1984–1987: Creighton Bluejays
- 1987–1998: Millard South Indians
- 1999–2016: Omaha Mavericks (women)

Don Klosterman is an American soccer coach. He was the head women's soccer coach at the University of Nebraska Omaha. He has served as the soccer coach there from 1999 to 2016, compiling a 219–119–21 record at the helm, including the 2005 NCAA Division II National Championship. He is a two time national coach of the year winner. He has guided the Mavericks to a 19–5 NCAA tournament record and a 68–11 mark in North Central Conference play. He has led the Mavericks to six North Central Conference championships.

He started his career as the junior varsity head soccer coach of Creighton Prep High School where he served from 1977 to 1979. From 1979 to 1983 he served as the head soccer coach at Benedictine. From 1984 to 1987, he served as the head men's soccer coach at Creighton University. He compiled a 17–30–3 record at the helm.
