= Diego Castro (Chilean footballer) =

Chilean footballer and manager

Personal information
- Full name: Diego Castro
- Date of birth: 10 October 1961 (age 65)
- Place of birth: Constitución, Chile
- Height: 5 ft 9 in (1.75 m)
- Positions: Forward; attacking midfielder

Senior career*
Years	Team	Apps	(Gls)
1979–1981	Aviación	27	(0)
1982–1983	Garden Grove Galactica	–	(–)
1982–1983	Chicago Sting	22	(0)
1983–1984	Chicago Sting (indoor)	4	(1)
1984–1985	Hertha BSC	22	(0)
1985–1986	Dallas Sidekicks (indoor)	30	(5)
1986–1987	Wichita Wings (indoor)	27	(8)
1987–1989	Memphis Storm (indoor)	46	(18)
1990–1991	Wichita Wings (indoor)	6	(2)
1991–1992	Dallas Sidekicks (indoor)	2	(0)
1994	Houston Hotshots (indoor)	7	(1)
Total		193	(35)

International career
1981	Chile U20		
- * Club domestic league appearances and goals

Diego Castro (born 10 October 1961) is a Chilean former professional footballer who played as a forward or attacking midfielder for clubs in Chile, the United States and Germany.

== Club career ==
Born in Constitución, Chile, Castro was with Aviación from 1979 to 1981 in both the Primera and the Segunda División, coinciding with players such as Arturo Jáuregui, Roberto Rojas and Eduardo Fournier. Then he moved to the United States in 1982 and played for the semi-professional club Garden Grove Galactica and Chicago Sting, where he coincided with the German player Hans Weiner, who suggested him to make a trial in Germany.

He went to Germany and joined Hertha Berlin in 1984, where he coincided with players such as Andreas Köpke, Dieter Timme and Hans Weiner, becoming the first Chilean to play in the German football. He made his debut in a friendly match against Tennis Borussia Berlin on 30 July. According to Hertha BSC Stiftung (Hertha BSC Foundation), Castro made 22 appearances in the 1984–85 2. Bundesliga, 3 appearances in the DFB-Pokal and 2 appearances in friendlies, where he scored a goal against Neuköllner Sportfreunde 1907.

Castro returned to the United States and made a career in indoor soccer, playing for Dallas Sidekicks, Wichita Wings, Memphis Storm and Houston Hotshots.

== International career ==
He took part of Chile at under-20 level, with Carlos Campos as coach.

== Coaching career ==
Following his retirement, he graduated as a soccer manager and started a football academy what provides players to universities. Since then he has development an extensive career as coach in the United States at youth level.

== Personal life ==
He attended to university at the age of 16 and studied chemistry and pharmacy for 3 years before switching to professional football.

His mother was a well-known Doctor of Linguistics who lived in the United States and before in London, England, where Castro also lived with her.

Castro married in the United States and made his home in Texas. He works alongside his wife, Kathy. His son, Jackson, is also a footballer.
