= Mark Plotkin (soccer) =

American soccer player and coach

Personal information
- Full name: Mark Plotkin
- Date of birth: ~1987 or 1988 (age 30 or 31)
- Place of birth: Naperville, Illinois, United States
- Height: 6 ft 0 in (1.83 m)
- Position: Midfielder

Youth career
- 2003–2006: Naperville North Huskies

College career
Years	Team	Apps	(Gls)
2006–2009	DePaul Blue Demons	77	(4)

Managerial career
- 2010–2012: DePaul Blue Demons (director)
- 2012–2013: DePaul Blue Demons (assistant)
- 2014–2017: Colgate Raiders (assistant)
- 2018–: DePaul Blue Demons

Mark Plotkin is an American soccer coach who coaches the DePaul Blue Demons men's soccer program. Plotkin was previously an assistant coach for the Colgate Raiders men's soccer program.

== Playing career ==
=== Youth and college ===
Plotkin was a four-year starter for DePaul, where he made 77 appearances, scoring 4 goals. He earned Big East Conference All-Academic teams in his four years as a player.

== Coaching career ==
Plotkin immediately began his coaching career after graduating from DePaul University. In 2010, he was hired as a director of operations for the men's soccer program. He remained as the director of operations through 2012, before being promoted to assistant coach. In 2014, he joined the coaching staff for Colgate University, where he was an assistant for the 2014 through 2016 seasons. Ahead of the 2017 NCAA Division I men's soccer season, Plotkin was promoted to associate head coach, where he helped the Raiders earn their first ever Sweet 16 berth in the 2017 NCAA Division I Men's Soccer Championship.

On December 21, 2017, Plotkin was appointed as the head coach for his alma mater, DePaul.
