= Cole Jensen =

American soccer player (born 2001)

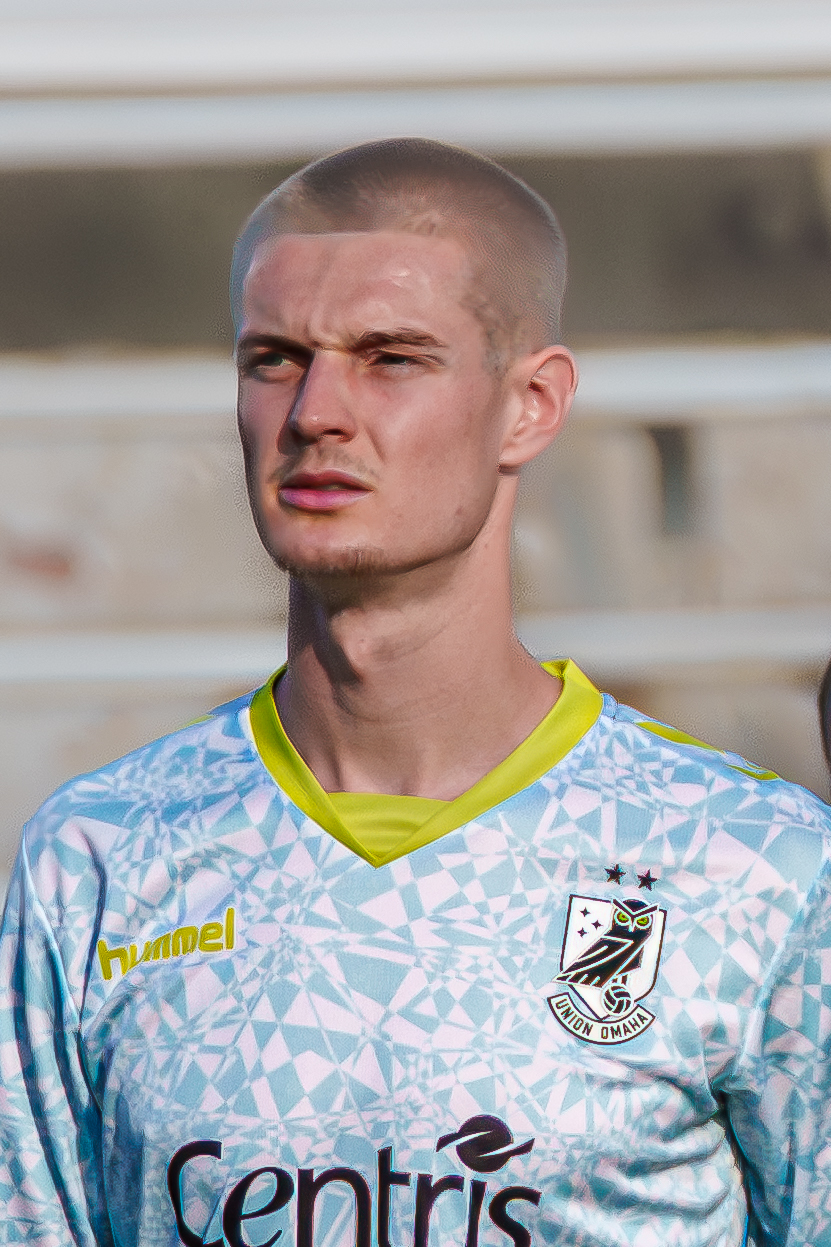
- Jensen with Union Omaha in 2026

Personal information
- Full name: Cole Christopher Jensen
- Date of birth: January 22, 2001 (age 25)
- Place of birth: Council Bluffs, Iowa, United States
- Height: 6 ft 5 in (1.96 m)
- Position: Goalkeeper

Team information
- Current team: Union Omaha
- Number: 99

Youth career
- Elkhorn SC

College career
Years	Team	Apps	(Gls)
2018–2022	Xavier Musketeers	72	(0)

Senior career*
Years	Team	Apps	(Gls)
2023–2024	Inter Miami	0	(0)
2023–2024	Inter Miami II	5	(0)
2025–	Union Omaha	22	(0)
- * Club domestic league appearances and goals as of October 31, 2026

Cole Christopher Jensen (born January 22, 2001) is an American professional soccer player who plays as a goalkeeper for USL League One club Union Omaha.

== Youth and college career ==
Jensen attended Lewis Central High School. In 2018, he attended Xavier University to play college soccer.

== Club career ==
In December 2022, it was announced Jensen was eligible for selection in the 2023 MLS SuperDraft. On December 21, 2022, Jensen was selected 18th overall in the SuperDraft by Inter Miami CF. He signed with Inter Miami on February 23, 2023. Jensen has spent time with Inter Miami CF II in the MLS Next Pro. On December 9, 2024, Inter Miami declined his contract and released him. On March 12, 2025, he would sign for Union Omaha in USL League One. He made his cup debut for the club in a 2–1 win against Flatirons Rush. He would make his League debut in a 3–1 win against South Georgia Tormenta.

== Honors ==
Inter Miami

- Leagues Cup: 2023
