= Diego Castro (politician) =

Brazilian politician (born 1992)

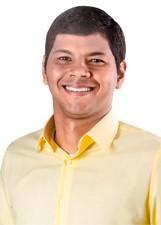
- Castro in 2022

Member of the Legislative Assembly of Bahia
- Incumbent
- Assumed office 1 February 2023

Personal details
- Born: 14 September 1992 (age 34)
- Party: Liberal Party (since 2022)

Diego Castro Barbosa (born 14 September 1992) is a Brazilian politician serving as a member of the Legislative Assembly of Bahia since 2023. He has served as chairman of the human rights and public security committee since 2025.
