= Duncan McGuire (soccer) =

American soccer player (born 2001)

- McGuire with Houston Dynamo in 2026

Personal information
- Full name: Duncan MacAllister McGuire
- Date of birth: February 5, 2001 (age 25)
- Place of birth: Omaha, Nebraska, U.S.
- Height: 6 ft 1 in (1.85 m)
- Position: Striker

Team information
- Current team: Houston Dynamo
- Number: 23

Youth career
- 2014–2018: Sporting Omaha FC

College career
Years	Team	Apps	(Gls)
2019–2022	Creighton Bluejays	55	(28)

Senior career*
Years	Team	Apps	(Gls)
2022	Lane United	11	(4)
2023–2026	Orlando City	85	(28)
2026–	Houston Dynamo	20	(1)

International career^{‡}
2023–2024	United States U23	9	(1)
2024	United States	1	(0)
- * Club domestic league appearances and goals as of 02:36, November 8, 2026 (UTC) ‡ National team caps and goals as of August 2, 2024

Duncan MacAllister McGuire (born February 5, 2001) is an American professional soccer player who plays as a striker for Major League Soccer club Houston Dynamo.

A Creighton Bluejays alumnus, McGuire was picked by Major League Soccer club Orlando City in the first round of the 2023 MLS SuperDraft. Prior to being drafted, McGuire had played a single season with USL League Two team Lane United. In McGuire's rookie season in Major League Soccer, he finished as Orlando City's top goalscorer and second highest total goal contributor.

In early 2024, McGuire made a single appearance with the United States national team in a friendly against Slovenia. Later that year, McGuire represented the United States U23 team at the 2024 Summer Olympics in France, where the team was eliminated in the quarter-finals by Morocco.

== Early career ==
Born in Omaha, Nebraska, McGuire prepped at Creighton Preparatory School where he was a two-time Omaha World-Herald All-Nebraska First Team selection (2018 and 2019) and was chosen to play at the 2019 Nebraska High School Soccer Senior Showcase. He played club soccer for Elkhorn SC.

=== Creighton Bluejays ===
Having attended the program's youth summer camps for a decade, McGuire committed to playing college soccer at Creighton University. He played three seasons for the Creighton Bluejays between 2019 and 2022, redshirting as a freshman in 2019. With the 2020 season delayed until early 2021 because of the COVID-19 pandemic, McGuire eventually made his collegiate debut on February 20, 2021, away to Marquette Golden Eagles. He was one of six players to appear in all 12 matches during the season, making four starts, scoring four goals and three assists, and was named to the All-Big East Second Team. He made a further 19 appearances as a redshirt sophomore, making five starts and scoring five goals.

2022 proved a breakout year for McGuire. He played in all 24 matches, starting in all but one, and scored 23 goals, the most in the nation and a new Bluejays single season record. Six of his goals came as Creighton won the 2022 Big East Conference men's soccer tournament and McGuire was named tournament offensive MVP. Creighton also made a run to the NCAA College Cup semi-finals, losing to eventual champions Syracuse Orange 3–2. Individually McGuire was named Big East Offensive Player of the Year, TopDrawerSoccer.com National Player of the Year, and was awarded the Hermann Trophy. He became the first Creighton Bluejay to win the honor since McGuire's head coach Johnny Torres in 1997.

== Club career ==
=== Lane United ===
McGuire played the 2022 USL League Two season with Lane United. He debuted in the first game of the season and scored his first goal in a 5–1 loss to Ballard FC on May 21, 2022. On June 4, McGuire assisted in two goals in a 2–0 victory over Oly Town FC, his first win with the club. In total, McGuire scored four goals and assisted three others in 11 appearances.

=== Orlando City ===
==== 2023: MLS debut and top club goal scorer ====
On December 21, 2022, McGuire was selected in the first round (6th overall) of the 2023 MLS SuperDraft by Orlando City. He was officially announced as a new signing by Orlando on February 22, 2023. He scored his first professional goal in his debut for Orlando against D.C. United on March 11 in a 1–1 draw. McGuire scored the equalizing goal against Houston Dynamo FC on July 21 in the group stage of the Leagues Cup, leading to a penalty shootout in which the Lions won. In the second group stage game on July 29, McGuire scored the equalizing goal against Santos Laguna in a 3–2 victory, helping to send Orlando top of the group and qualify for the round of 32.

In the last five matches of the regular season, McGuire scored or assisted in at least one goal in each match, including his first brace for the club in a 2–0 victory over Toronto FC on October 22, one of which was awarded Goal of the Matchday. The Lions advanced to the quarter-finals of the 2023 MLS Cup Playoffs before being eliminated by Columbus Crew in a 2–0 loss. McGuire finished as the club's top goalscorer of the season with 15 goals in all competitions. With an additional three assists, his 18-goal contributions was second only to Facundo Torres with 19.

==== 2024: Failed transfer to Blackburn Rovers and eventual contract extension ====
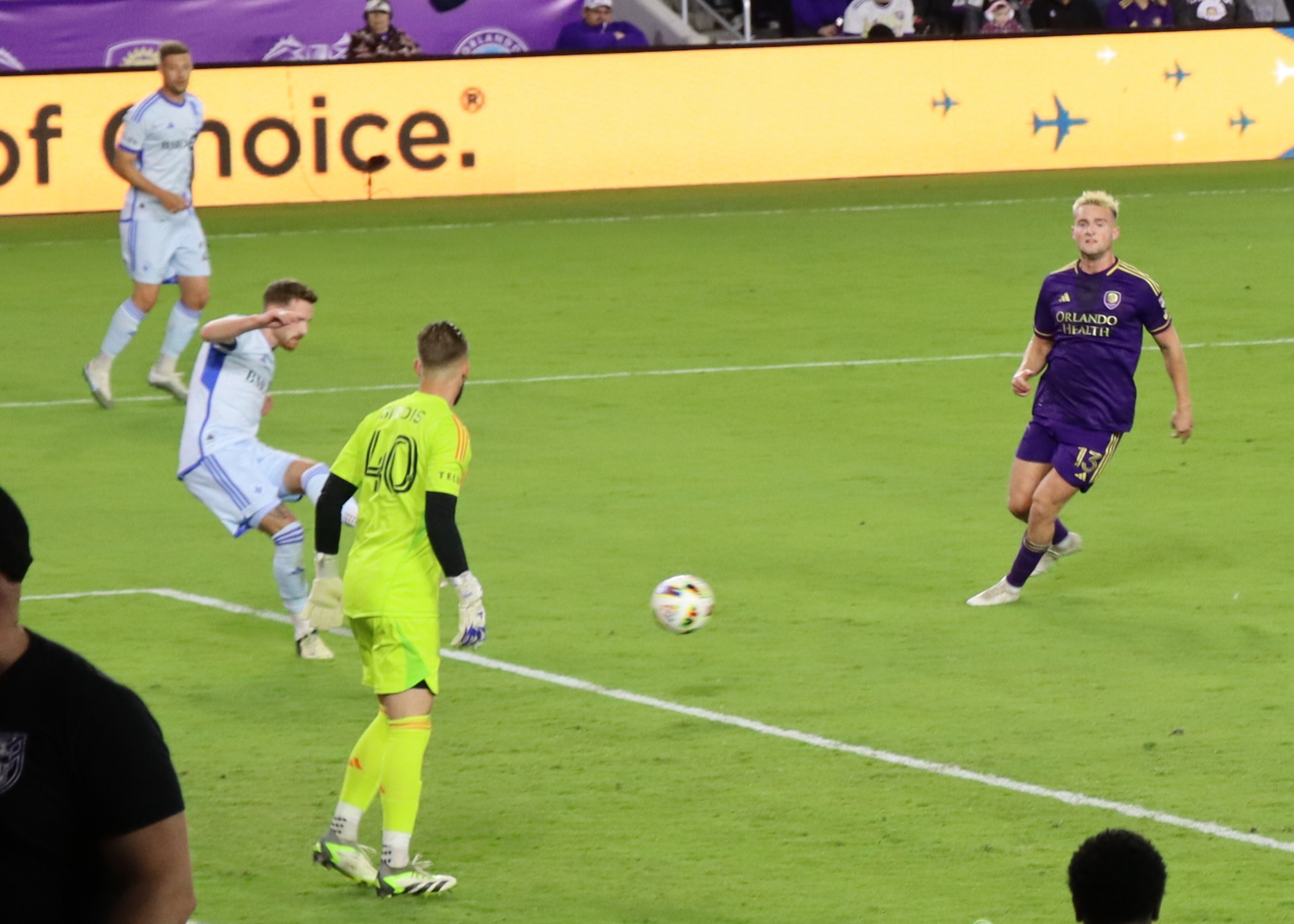
McGuire (purple) threatens CF Montréal for the ball in 2024

On January 31, 2024, McGuire flew to the United Kingdom to finalize a permanent transfer to EFL Championship side Blackburn Rovers. However, Rovers pulled out of the deal while McGuire was on the flight and he subsequently spent the night in Sheffield amid interest from fellow Championship club Sheffield Wednesday. The following day it was announced Orlando City had reached an agreement with Blackburn Rovers for a six-month loan with an option to buy. The loan move was denied by the English Football League due to an "administrative error" during the submission of McGuire's registration documents by Blackburn Rovers, which meant the club missed the transfer deadline. An appeal by the club was rejected by the EFL board on February 8 and McGuire returned to Orlando. In an interview later in May on Goal's Studs Up show, McGuire discussed the failed transfer to Blackburn Rovers and that he would only be open to attempting to sign with the club again if they offered a very high paying contract.

On February 21, McGuire scored the first goal for Orlando in their competitive 2024 season in a 3–0 victory over Cavalry FC in the first leg of their tie in the 2024 CONCACAF Champions Cup. On March 9, McGuire scored the club's first goal of the regular season and the fastest goal in club history, beating Tesho Akindele's previous record of 31 seconds, when he hit the back of the net in under thirteen seconds against Minnesota United with the help of an assist from Rafael Santos. However, despite making it a brace in the second half, Orlando would go on to lose 3–2. McGuire's addition to the US Olympic Soccer Team ahead of the 2024 Summer Olympics in Paris made him the first person from the club to be chosen for the competition.

In August, McGuire and Orlando City agreed in principle to a new contract which guaranteed him at the club through 2027 with an option year for 2028. The new deal would see McGuire receive a significant pay raise which will put him on par with the salary of designated players. On August 22, Orlando City officially announced the contract extension. McGuire said of the contract that "I'm really happy to get this deal done and know that I can call Orlando home for the next three years".

On November 9, during Orlando's third best-of-three match against Charlotte FC in the 2024 MLS Cup playoffs, McGuire dislocated his shoulder after being pulled down in the penalty box by Charlotte's Djibril Diani, drawing a penalty kick which Facundo Torres later converted to equalize and allow Orlando to advance to the next round in the subsequent penalty shoot-out. After a failure to fix his shoulder on the sideline, it was relocated in the locker room and he was unable to participate in the penalty kick shootout. On December 13, it was announced that McGuire underwent a successful arthroscopic surgery to repair his right labrum and rotator cuff. McGuire was given an expected recovery time of 4–5 months, meaning he would miss the start of the 2025 season. McGuire tallied 11 goals and three assists across all competitions, totaling 14-goal contributions.

==== 2025–26: Shoulder surgeries and reduced playtime ====
On March 15, 2025, McGuire returned early from injury, being placed on the substitute bench ahead of a league match against the New York Red Bulls. In the 87th-minute, McGuire came on as a substitute for Luis Muriel and made an instant positive impact, but he was unable to convert any chances as Orlando City drew 2–2. McGuire failed to score a goal, having his time spent on the field reduced by Muriel emerging as the starting striker ahead of McGuire, until May 7 when he scored the fourth goal of a 5–0 win at the Tampa Bay Rowdies in the 2025 U.S. Open Cup. On June 6, Orlando City announced that McGuire had undergone another arthroscopic surgery to repair his labrum, this time for his left shoulder, meaning he would miss several months of games once again. In an interview, McGuire said it was "tough" to suffer the same injury to both of his shoulders, but also that it was "smoother and a little bit quicker" to recover after the second surgery since he had the experience of learning how hard he could push his body during the recovery period from the first surgery. McGuire returned on August 27 as Orlando City lost 3–1 to rivals Inter Miami in the semi-finals of the Leagues Cup as an injury-time substitute. McGuire finished the season with four goals and two assists across all competitions, his least prolific season of professional soccer thus far.

McGuire scored his first goal of the 2026 season for Orlando City in a 2–1 win over CF Montréal on March 14, helping to secure Orlando's first win of the season after the club began the season with three consecutive losses. At the time of his mid-season departure, McGuire had scored two goals across 12 appearances in all competitions.

=== Houston Dynamo ===
On July 10, 2026, McGuire was signed by fellow Major League Soccer side Houston Dynamo in exchange for up to $2.4 million in general allocation money across three seasons with a sell-on percentage being retained by Orlando City. At the time of McGuire's signing, he had only scored five goals in the past eight months. McGuire said after signing for the Dynamo that he wanted to "get my first goal out of the way as early as possible" so that he could "settle in" and "take the nerves away". McGuire made his debut on July 22, starting in a 1–1 draw with D.C. United. On October 10, McGuire scored his first goal for the Dynamo, securing a 2–2 draw against Minnesota United.

== International career ==
=== Youth ===
In October 2023, McGuire was called up to the United States under-23 national team ahead of friendlies against Mexico and Japan. He scored his first international goal on his second appearance just two minutes after being substituted on against Japan in an eventual 4–1 victory on October 18. On March 14, 2024, McGuire received a call-up to the under-23s for training camp in Spain and France as well as friendlies against Guinea and France, which resulted in a 3–0 victory and 2–2 draw respectively.

McGuire started for the under-23s in a 2–0 friendly loss against Japan on June 11 in the lead-up to the 2024 Summer Olympics. McGuire was ultimately selected for the Olympic Soccer Team. In an interview, McGuire described how he felt after receiving a call from Marko Mitrović and getting called up to represent the United States at the Olympics, saying that he was overjoyed and "wanted to jump up and down like a little kid".

The United States faced France, New Zealand, and Guinea in Group A in the group stage of the Olympics. McGuire started in their loss to France and win over New Zealand, but he came on as a 66th-minute substitute for Paxten Aaronson in their victory over Guinea, which secured the Americans moving onto the knockout stage in second place to face Morocco in the quarterfinals. McGuire once again came on as a substitute, this time as a 66th-minute substitute for Djordje Mihailovic, and McGuire and the United States were eliminated 4–0 by the Moroccans.

=== Senior ===
In January 2024, McGuire was given his first call-up to the senior national team for January training in Orlando ahead of a friendly against Slovenia by Gregg Berhalter. On January 20, McGuire came on as a 62nd-minute substitute for Brian White in their 1–0 loss to Slovenia.

== Style of play ==
McGuire is noted for playing with an intense work rate and consistently pressing opposition players in order to foment turnovers of the ball and create chances.

== Personal life ==
McGuire tried playing numerous other sports, but when he was 8 or 9-years-old he realized he was best at soccer. He never really had time to watch soccer on television because he spent so much of his time playing youth club soccer.

McGuire has three siblings, two brothers and a sister. His brother Holden has down syndrome and McGuire credits his younger brother for teaching him appreciate the little things in life and to not get angry about insignificant things. The two brothers talk to each other over the phone or over video call nearly every single day. McGuire says that during winter time when he is able to be back in Omaha he likes to "spend as much time with him as I can".

== Career statistics ==
=== Club ===
As of match played November 7, 2026

Appearances and goals by club, season and competition
Club	Season	League			National cup (Note: Includes U.S. Open Cup)		League cup (Note: Includes MLS Cup playoffs)		Continental		Other		Total	
Club	Season	Division	Apps	Goals	Apps	Goals	Apps	Goals	Apps	Goals	Apps	Goals	Apps	Goals
Lane United	2022	USL League Two	11	4	—		—		—		—		11	4
Orlando City	2023	Major League Soccer	29	13	1	0	3	0	1 (Note: Appearance(s) in CONCACAF Champions Cup)	0	3 (Note: Appearance(s) in Leagues Cup)	2	37	15
Orlando City	2024	Major League Soccer	27	10	—		5	0	3	1	2	0	37	11
Orlando City	2025	Major League Soccer	18	3	2	1	1	0	—		2	0	23	4
Orlando City	2026	Major League Soccer	11	2	1	0	—		—		0	0	12	2
Orlando City	Total		85	28	4	1	9	0	4	1	7	2	109	32
Houston Dynamo	2026	Major League Soccer	20	1	—		0	0	—		0	0	20	1
Career total			116	33	4	1	9	0	4	1	7	2	140	37

=== International ===
As of match played January 20, 2024

Appearances and goals by national team and year
National team	Year	Apps	Goals
United States	2024	1	0
Total		1	0

== Honors ==
Individual

- Big East Offensive Player of the Year: 2022
- TopDrawerSoccer.com National Player of the Year: 2022
- Hermann Trophy: 2022
