= Jackson Castro =

American soccer player (born 2002)

Personal information
- Date of birth: December 24, 2002 (age 23)
- Place of birth: Plano, Texas, United States
- Height: 5 ft 8 in (1.73 m)
- Position: Midfielder

Team information
- Current team: Forward Madison
- Number: 16

Youth career
- Solar SC

College career
Years	Team	Apps	(Gls)
2021–2024	Creighton Bluejays	74	(22)

Senior career*
Years	Team	Apps	(Gls)
2021–2022	Chicago FC United	18	(4)
2023	Bavarian United SC	8	(2)
2024	Vermont Green FC	10	(2)
2025	Whitecaps FC 2	28	(5)
2025	→ Vancouver Whitecaps FC (loan)	1	(0)
2026–	Forward Madison	20	(1)
- * Club domestic league appearances and goals as of October 31, 2026

Jackson Castro (born December 24, 2002) is an American soccer player who plays for Forward Madison in USL League One.

== Early life ==
Castro played youth soccer with Solar SC.

== College career ==
In 2021, Castro began attending Creighton University, where he played for the men's soccer team. During his sophomore season, he was named the Big East Conference Offensive Player of the Week on two occasions, before being named to the All-Big East Second Team at the end of the season. In 2023, he was named to the All-Big East First Team. Ahead of his senior season in 2024, he was named to the Big East All-Preseason Team. At the end of the season, he was once again named to the All-Big East First Team. After the season, he was invited to participate in the MLS College Showcase.

== Club career ==
In 2021 and 2022, Castro played with Chicago FC United in USL League Two. In 2023, he played with Bavarian United SC. In February 2024, Castro signed with Vermont Green FC in USL League Two. On June 26, 2024, he scored two goals in a 5-0 victory over Boston City FC.

In February 2025, he signed a professional contract with Whitecaps FC 2 in MLS Next Pro for the 2025 season, with an option for 2026. On April 6, 2025, he scored his first goal in a 5-3 loss to the Tacoma Defiance. In June and July 2025, he signed a series of short-term loans with the Vancouver Whitecaps FC first team. On July 4, 2025, he made his MLS debut for the Whitecaps, in a substitute appearance, against the LA Galaxy.

Castro signed with USL League One club Forward Madison FC prior to the 2026 season.

== Personal life ==
Castro is the son of former professional soccer player Diego Castro.
