= Owen O'Malley (soccer) =

American soccer player (born 2001)

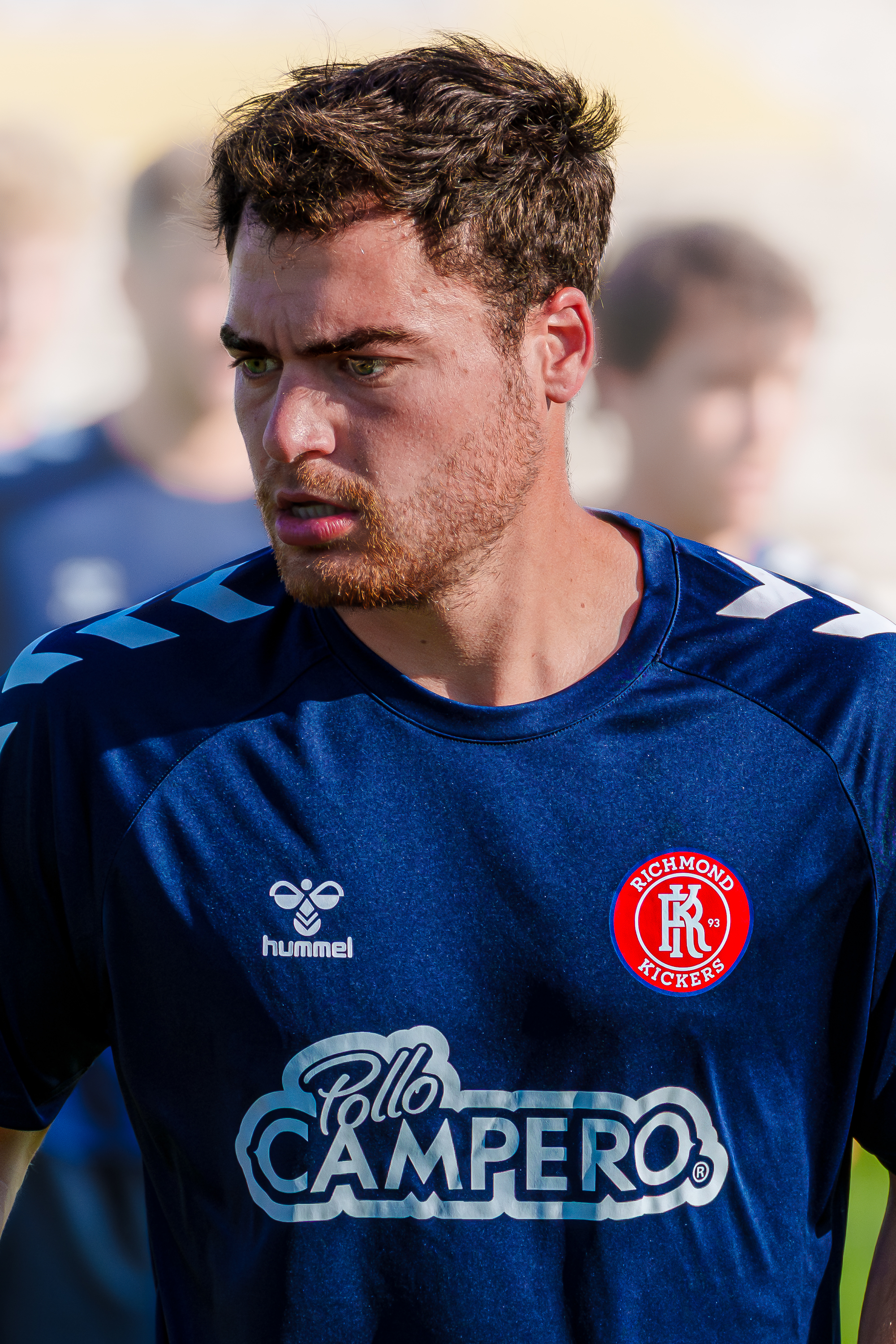
- O'Malley with the Richmond Kickers in 2026

Personal information
- Full name: Owen O'Malley
- Date of birth: October 1, 2001 (age 25)
- Place of birth: Cary, North Carolina, United States
- Height: 1.82 m (6 ft 0 in)
- Positions: Winger; right-back

Team information
- Current team: Richmond Kickers
- Number: 12

Youth career
- 2016–2020: North Carolina FC

College career
Years	Team	Apps	(Gls)
2020–2022	CU Bluejays	52	(9)

Senior career*
Years	Team	Apps	(Gls)
2022	Vermont Green	13	(3)
2023	St. Louis City SC 2	14	(0)
2024	Tacoma Defiance	12	(0)
2025	Vermont Green	5	(1)
2026–	Richmond Kickers	26	(1)
- * Club domestic league appearances and goals as of November 2, 2026

Owen O'Malley (born October 1, 2001) is an American professional soccer player that plays as a winger and right-back for the Richmond Kickers in USL League One.

== Early life ==
Owen O'Malley was born October 1, 2001. The son of Erica and Patrick, Owen also has two siblings Shea and Finn.

His sister, Shea, is also a professional soccer player. Owen's father also played soccer at Villanova.

== Early career ==
He started his career with the North Carolina FC Academy in 2015 at the age of 14, under then assistant coach, John Bradford. O'Malley even trained with North Carolina FC’s First Team, teaming with Landon Sloan, his later teammate that he would meet in college. A two-time North Carolina State Cup champion, O’Malley helped guide his squad to Region 3 Premier League Championship in 2015.

== College career ==
O'Malley started his college career with the CU Bluejays after leaving North Carolina Academy in his first season, O'Malley recorded 11 appearances while six of them he started. He would make a future 41 appearances for the Bluejays and even providing nine goals.

== Career ==
=== Vermont Green ===
While still in college, O'Malley signed for USL League Two expansion club, Vermont Green for their inaugural 2022 season. He would play 1,140 minutes in his inaugural season and would score 3 goals.

=== St. Louis City ===
On December 22, 2022, O'Malley was drafted ninth-overall by St. Louis City in the 2023 MLS SuperDraft and was their first pick. He would make 14 appearances for the club's reserve side.

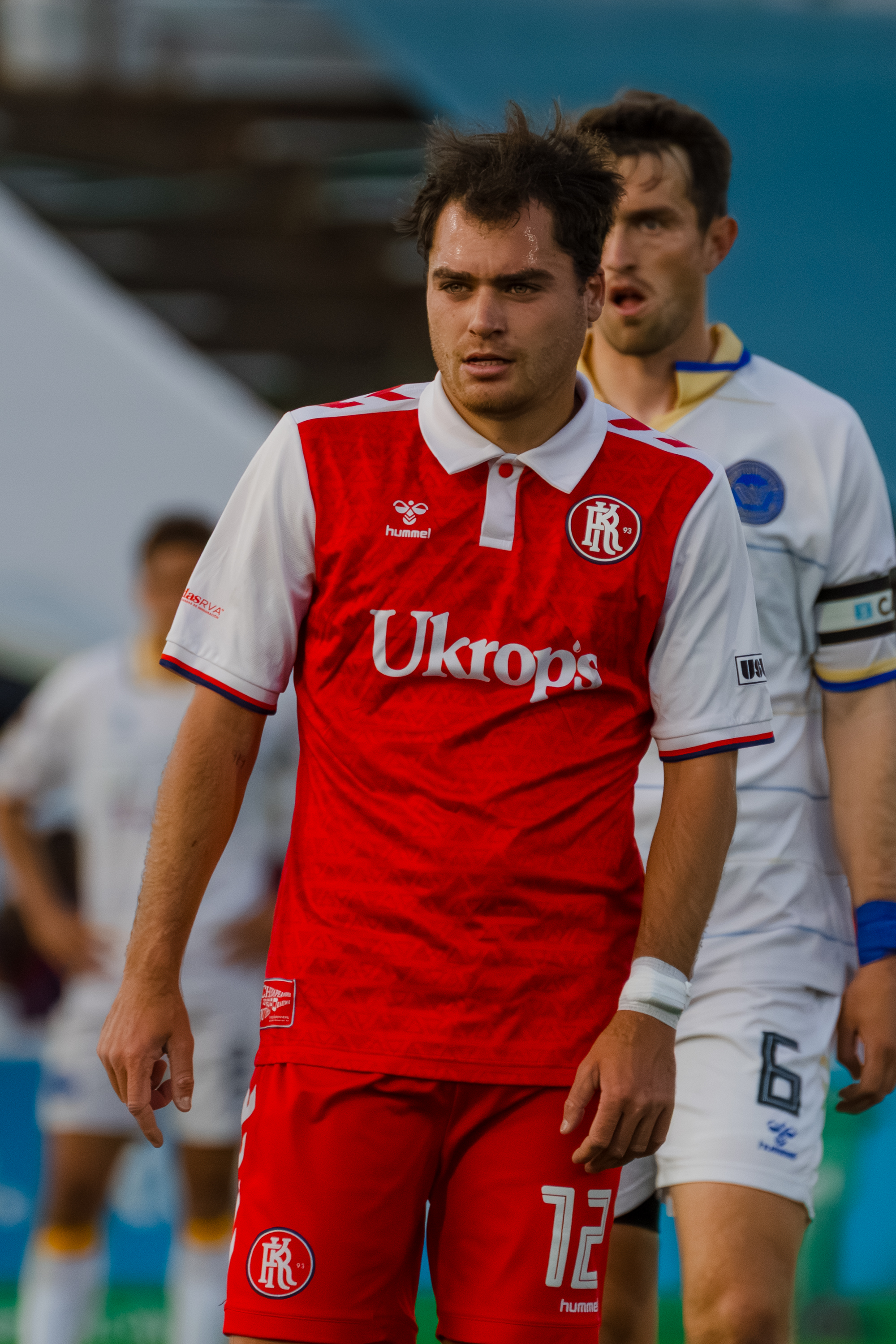
O'Malley with the Kickers against Westchester SC on May 1

=== Tacoma Defiance ===
After struggling to score a goal for St. Louis City, O'Malley signed for Tacoma Defiance on March 14, 2024, another club in the MLS Next Pro, which was the reserve team for the Seattle Sounders. After, only making 12 appearances, getting two assists and no goals, his contract was expired.

=== Return to Vermont Green ===
On May 5, 2025, O'Malley rejoined his first club, Vermont Green for their 2025 season, and helped the team to make the playoffs and win the club's first League title in their history. On September 26, 2025, and he received USL League Two Goal Of The Season after his stunning goal in the 99th minute against Western Mass Pioneers.

=== Richmond Kickers ===
On January 8, 2026, O'Malley signed for the Richmond Kickers in USL League One. He made his debut for the club in the opening match of the season, in a 1–1 draw against AV Alta.
