= Giorgio Probo =

Italian footballer (born 1999)

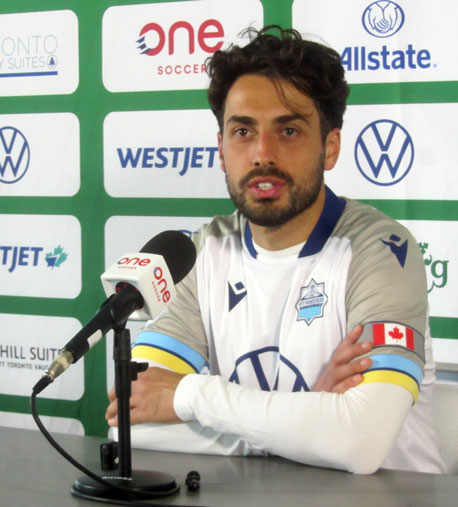
- Probo in 2025

Personal information
- Date of birth: 19 July 1999 (age 27)
- Place of birth: Bergamo, Italy
- Height: 1.70 m (5 ft 7 in)
- Position: Midfielder

Team information
- Current team: Las Vegas Lights
- Number: 27

Youth career
- Atalanta
- 2016–2017: Virtus Bergamo

College career
| Years | Team | Apps | (Gls) |
| 2021 | Iowa Western Reivers | 22 | (5) |
| 2022–2023 | Creighton Bluejays | 31 | (2) |

Senior career*
| Years | Team | Apps | (Gls) |
| 2017–2019 | Virtus CiseranoBergamo (Note: Virtus Bergamo became Virtus CiseranoBergamo following a merger with Ciserano in 2019) | 62 | (0) |
| 2019–2020 | Borgosesia | 8 | (0) |
| 2023 | Vermont Green FC | 12 | (0) |
| 2024–2025 | HFX Wanderers | 44 | (6) |
| 2025– | Las Vegas Lights | 36 | (0) |
- * Club domestic league appearances and goals as of 10:22, 9 November 2026 (UTC)

Giorgio Probo (born 19 July 1999) is an Italian footballer who plays for USL Championship club Las Vegas Lights.

== Early life ==
Probo played youth football with Atalanta, later playing with Virtus Bergamo.

== College career ==
In 2021, he began attending Iowa Western Community College. In the 2021 Fall season, he was named the Junior College DI Player of the Year in 2021, a JUCO All-American, and helping the team win the national tournament title and being named tournament MVP. He scored five goals and added six assists that season in 22 total appearances, between the season and national tournament.

In 2022, he transferred to Creighton University to play for the men's soccer team. At the end of his first season, he was named to the All-Big East Conference Third Team and the BIG EAST All-Tournament Team, as Creighton won the Big East title. At the end of the 2023 season, he was named the Big East Co-Midfielder of the Year and was named to the All-Big East First Team. His head coach at Creighton, Johnny Torres, called Probo "the best NCAA midfielder in America".

== Club career ==
Probo began his senior career with Virtus Bergamo (later known as Virtus CiseranoBergamo, following a merger in 2019) in the Serie D. He made 65 appearances for the club across all compeititions.

In December 2019, he moved to fellow Serie D side Borgosesia.

In 2023, he joined Vermont Green FC in USL League Two. He recorded 7 assists in 12 appearances, matching the club record for assists in a single season.

After going unselected in the 2024 MLS SuperDraft, Probo signed with HFX Wanderers FC in the Canadian Premier League on a two-year contract. He made his debut on 13 April 2024 against Pacific FC. He scored his first goal on 11 May 2024 in a 1-1 draw with Cavalry FC. In August 2025, he agreed to a mutual termination of the remainder of his contract.

In September 2025, Probo signed with Las Vegas Lights FC in the USL Championship for the remainder of the 2025 season, with an option for 2026. He made his debut on September 5, 2025 against Phoenix Rising FC.

== Career statistics ==
As of 15 August 2025

| Club | Season | League | | | Domestic Cup | | Continental | | Other | | Total | |
| Club | Season | Division | Apps | Goals | Apps | Goals | Apps | Goals | Apps | Goals | Apps | Goals |
|---|---|---|---|---|---|---|---|---|---|---|---|---|
| Virtus Bergamo | 2016–17 | Serie D | 1 | 0 | – | | – | | – | | 1 | 0 |
| Virtus Bergamo | 2017–18 | Serie D | 22 | 0 | – | | – | | – | | 22 | 0 |
| Virtus Bergamo | 2018–19 | Serie D | 29 | 0 | – | | – | | – | | 29 | 0 |
| Virtus CiseranoBergamo | 2019–20 | Serie D | 10 | 0 | – | | – | | – | | 10 | 0 |
| Virtus CiseranoBergamo | Total | | 62 | 0 | 0 | 0 | 0 | 0 | 0 | 0 | 62 | 0 |
| Borgosesia | 2019–20 | Serie D | 8 | 0 | – | | – | | – | | 8 | 0 |
| HFX Wanderers FC | 2024 | Canadian Premier League | 28 | 4 | 1 | 0 | – | | – | | 29 | 4 |
| HFX Wanderers FC | 2025 | Canadian Premier League | 16 | 2 | 1 | 0 | – | | – | | 17 | 2 |
| HFX Wanderers FC | Total | | 44 | 6 | 2 | 0 | 0 | 0 | 0 | 0 | 46 | 6 |
| Career total | | | 114 | 6 | 2 | 0 | 0 | 0 | 0 | 0 | 116 | 6 |
