= Creighton Bluejays men's soccer =

American college soccer team

- 2022 Creighton Bluejays men's soccer team
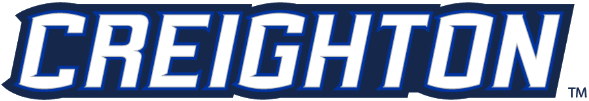
- Founded: 1979; 47 years ago
- University: Creighton University
- Head coach: Johnny Torres (5th season)
- Conference: Big East
- Location: Omaha, Nebraska, US
- Stadium: Morrison Stadium (capacity: 6,000)
- Nickname: Bluejays
- Colors: Blue, white, and navy blue
Home	Away

NCAA tournament runner-up
- 2000

NCAA tournament College Cup
- 1996, 2000, 2002, 2011, 2012, 2022

NCAA tournament Quarterfinals
- 1996, 1998, 2000, 2002, 2003, 2005, 2008, 2011, 2012, 2014, 2015, 2022

NCAA tournament appearances
- 1992, 1993, 1994, 1995, 1996, 1997, 1998, 1999, 2000, 2001, 2002, 2003, 2004, 2005, 2006, 2007, 2008, 2010, 2011, 2012, 2013, 2014, 2015, 2016, 2021, 2022, 2026

Conference tournament championships
- Big East Conference; 2022 Missouri Valley Conference; 1992, 1993, 1994, 1995, 1997, 1998, 2000, 2002, 2005, 2006, 2008, 2011, 2012

Conference regular season championships
- Big East Conference; 2014, 2018 Missouri Valley Conference; 1992, 1993, 1994, 1995, 1996, 2003, 2006, 2007, 2008, 2010, 2011, 2012

2022 Big East Conference men's soccer standings
	Conf.					Overall
Team	W		L		T	W		L		T
No. 20 Georgetown+	8	–	1	–	1	12	–	6	–	3
Seton Hall+	4	–	1	–	5	7	–	4	–	7
Xavier	3	–	1	–	6	9	–	2	–	7
Butler	4	–	3	–	3	10	–	6	–	3
Providence	3	–	2	–	5	5	–	5	–	7
No. 9 Creighton‡	3	–	3	–	4	13	–	5	–	6
UConn	3	–	4	–	3	7	–	7	–	3
St. John's	2	–	4	–	4	4	–	8	–	5
DePaul	1	–	4	–	5	4	–	6	–	7
Villanova	2	–	6	–	2	6	–	8	–	3
Marquette	1	–	5	–	4	5	–	9	–	4
‡ – 2022 Big East Tournament champion + – At-large invitation to the 2022 NCAA tournament; As of December 13, 2022; Rankings from United Soccer Coaches; Source: Big East

The Creighton Bluejays men's soccer team represents Creighton University in NCAA men's Division I soccer competitions. They compete in the Big East Conference and have risen to prominence in collegiate men's soccer in the last few decades having gone to the NCAA Division I Men's Soccer Tournament in 22 of the previous 23 seasons, going back to 1992, with five appearances in the College Cup semifinals and one appearance in the National Championship Match. In conference play, the Bluejays have won 13 conference regular season championships and 13 conference tournament championships; the most recent being the 2014 Big East Conference Regular Season Championship. Creighton is the only soccer program in the nation to have at least one athlete taken in every Major League Soccer (MLS) draft from 1996 to 2014. They are currently coached by Johnny Torres.

== History ==
=== First years ===
The Creighton men's soccer team has made 22 NCAA Tournament appearances in the last 23 years going back to 1992. The Bluejays were runners-up in the NCAA tournament in 2000 losing in the National Championship Match to Connecticut. They have also reached the College Cup semifinal round in 1996, 2002, 2011, and 2012, and the Quarterfinal Round in 1998, 2000, 2003, 2005, 2008, and 2014.

=== Independent play and inactive period (1979–1990) ===
Creighton first fielded a men's soccer team in 1979. In 1980, the team began playing home games at Rosenblatt Stadium. After experiencing varied degrees of success, Creighton did not field a men's soccer team from 1986 to 1989. In 1990, the Bluejays resumed play and began playing their home games at Tranquility Park in western Omaha.

=== Missouri Valley Conference era (1991–2012) ===
In 1991, the men's soccer team began play in the Missouri Valley Conference where they experienced success early and often—winning four Missouri Valley Conference Regular Season Championships and four Missouri Valley Conference Tournament Championships in the team's first five years in the conference. The Creighton Soccer program entered a new era in 2003 with the opening of an on-campus soccer facility, the Michael G. Morrison, S.J., Stadium. The men's soccer team continued its success through the 2012 season—winning the team's 12th Missouri Valley Conference Regular Season Championship, 13th Missouri Valley Conference Tournament Championship, and advancing to the College Cup semifinal round for the fifth time. During their time in the Missouri Valley Conference, the Bluejays boasted 12 Missouri Valley Conference Players of the Year, 11 Missouri Valley Conference Defensive Players of the Year, 13 Missouri Valley Conference Tournament Most Valuable Players, and 6 Missouri Valley Conference Coach of the Year Awards.

=== Big East Conference era (2013–present) ===
On March 20, 2013, the Creighton administration announced that the school would join the Big East Conference in July 2013. In their first season in the conference, the Bluejays finished fifth in regular season play and lost in the first round of the 2013 Big East Men's Soccer Tournament, but did make their 21st appearance in the NCAA Division I Men's Soccer Tournament.

In 2014, the Creighton men's soccer team clinched the 2014 Big East Conference Regular Season Championship after posting a 7–1–1 conference record and defeating Providence by a score of 3 – 0 in the final regular season game of the year. However, Providence exacted its revenge a week later; beating the Bluejays 1 – 0 and ousting them from the 2014 Big East Men's Soccer Tournament in the second round. Despite the loss, Creighton was chosen as the 12th seed in the 2014 NCAA Division I Men's Soccer Championship with an at-large invitation, giving the team a bye into the second round of the tournament. In the 2014 NCAA Tournament, the Bluejays advanced to the Elite 8, or Quarterfinals Round, by defeating Oregon State 1 – 0 in the second round, and knocking out conference rival Xavier by a score of 2 – 1 in the third round of the tournament. In the 2014 Elite 8, the men's soccer team played UMBC to a double-overtime scoreless draw before conceding 4 – 5 in a penalty shootout. Creighton ended the 2014 season with a final overall record of 16–3–3.

== Stadium ==
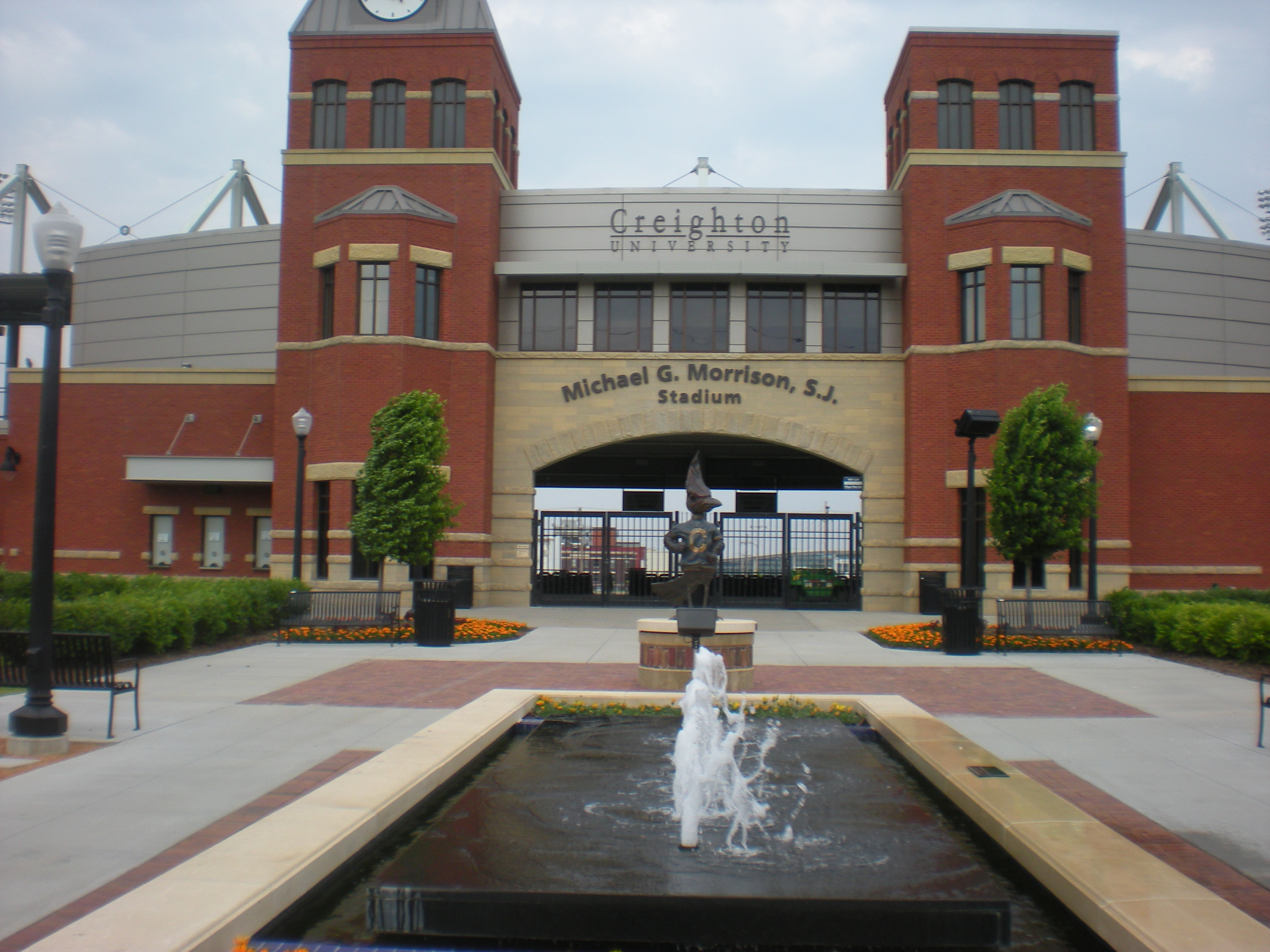
Morrison Stadium is Creighton's home venue

Since 2003, Creighton has played their home matches on campus at Morrison Stadium, a 6,000-seat soccer-specific stadium, which is named after former university President Fr. Michael Morrison, S.J. The men's soccer team played their first match at the new stadium on August 29, 2003, fighting to a thrilling double-overtime scoreless draw against Butler. The team would have to wait only two days to notch their first victory at their new home grounds, defeating Furman 3–1 on August 31, 2003.

The Creighton men's soccer team has enjoyed significant success at home since its return in to play in 1990. As of 2014, the Bluejays’ home record is 203–35–20 for an impressive winning percentage of .826 since 1990. As of 2014, the men's soccer team, who annually rank among NCAA leaders in attendance for home games, are 101–19–15 (.804) overall and 36–6–3 (.834) in conference play all-time at Morrison Stadium. As of 2014, Creighton is an impressive 71–9–4 (.869) at home all-time in regular-season conference play.

== Rivalries ==
The main rival for Creighton is University of Nebraska Omaha, the only other NCAA Division I men's soccer program in Nebraska. The rivalry is known as the "Dodge Street Derby".

=== Dodge Street Derby (Omaha) ===
Creighton victories	Omaha victories	Tie games

No.	Date	Location	Winner	Score
1	September 8, 1979	Plum Creek Park (Note: Match held at Concordia University Nebraska as part of the Concordia Tournament)	Creighton	3–2
2	September 15, 1979	Dodge Park	Creighton	3–1
3	October 11, 1979	Caniglia Field	Omaha	2–1
4	September 6, 1980	Plum Creek Park	Omaha	3–2
5	November 13, 1980	Caniglia Field	Omaha	1–0
6	October 25, 1981	Johnny Rosenblatt Stadium	Creighton	3–0
7	October 23, 1982	Caniglia Field	Creighton	2–0
8	September 5, 2016	Morrison Stadium	Tie	1–1
9	September 26, 2017	Caniglia Field	Creighton	1–0
10	September 16, 2019	Morrison Stadium	Creighton	2–1
11	February 27, 2021	Caniglia Field	Omaha	3–0
12	September 29, 2021	Morrison Stadium	Creighton	1–0
13	September 14, 2022	Caniglia Field	Creighton	6–1
Series: Creighton leads 8–4–1

Source: Creighton Men's Soccer Record Book

== Coaches ==
Creighton's current men's soccer coach is Johnny Torres.

Prior to Bolowich, Jamie Clark led the Bluejays for one season, 2010, in which they compiled a 13–5–2 and returned to the NCAA tournament with an at-large bid after being left out during the 2009 season, breaking a streak of 17 consecutive NCAA appearances.

Prior to Clark's only season at the helm, Creighton has had only two other head coaches since the reinstatement of the program in 1990. They are current Stanford University head coach Bret Simon, who was head coach of Creighton from 1995 to 2000 and current Penn State head coach Bob Warming, who was head coach of Creighton from 1990 to 1994 and 2001 to 2009.

Prior to the team's inactive period, from 1986 to 1989, the Bluejays were coached by Mark Schmechel from 1979 to 1980, Wayne Rasmussen from 1981 to –1982, and Don Klosterman from 1983 to 1985.

== Players ==
=== Honors and awards ===
Through the years, many Bluejays have gone on to play professionally, and twenty have been named All-Americans for their play at Creighton:

=== All-Americans ===
==== First Team ====
- Fabian Herbers – 2014
- Jose Gomez – 2012
- Andrew Ribeiro – 2012
- Ethan Finlay – 2011
- Brian Holt – 2011
- Andrei Gotsmanov – 2008
- Mike Tranchilla – 2002
- David Wright – 1999
- Richard Mulrooney – 1998
- Johnny Torres – 1996*, 1997*^{†}
- Keith DeFini – 1993
- Brian Kamler – 1993
- * = National Player of the Year
- ^{†} = Herman Trophy Winner

==== Second Team ====
- Timo Pitter – 2014
- Jose Ribas – 2014
- Andrew Duran – 2011
- Greg Jordan – 2011
- Ethan Finlay – 2010
- Chris Schuler – 2008
- Brian Mullan – 2000
- Brian Kamler – 1991

==== Third Team ====
- Matt Wieland – 2005
- Tom Zawislan – 1999
- Brian Kamler – 1992

There have been two former Bluejays who have earned at least one cap for the U.S. National Team, Brian Mullan and Richard Mulrooney.

Current Creighton head coach Johnny Torres a Creighton player that won the 1997 Hermann Trophy. Duncan McGuire followed his coach, Johnny Torres, in winning the Herman Trophy in 2022. The Hermann Trophy is awarded annually by the Missouri Athletic Club to the nation's best men's college soccer player.

=== Former Bluejays in the MLS ===
- Player (Current Team if Active)
- Charles Auguste (Houston Dynamo)
- Mehdi Ballouchy
- Steve Bernal
- Andrew Duran
- Ethan Finlay (Austin FC)
- Fabian Herbers (Chicago Fire)
- Daniel Hernández
- Lance Hill
- Brian Holt
- Greg Jordan
- Ryan Junge
- Brent Kallman (Minnesota United FC)
- Brian Kamler
- Michael Kraus
- Duncan McGuire (Orlando City SC)
- Eric Miller (Portland Timbers)
- Brian Mullan
- Richard Mulrooney
- Julian Nash
- Owen O'Malley (St. Louis City SC)
- Ross Paule
- Andrew Peterson
- Tyler Polak
- Angel Rivillo
- Brett Rodriguez
- Chris Schuler
- Seth Sinovic
- Johnny Torres
- David Wagenfuhr

Numerous former Creighton men's soccer players have gone on to play in various professional soccer leagues outside of the MLS—both in the United States, including the United Soccer Leagues and North American Soccer League, and internationally.

== Honours ==
=== Titles ===
- Big East Conference regular season (2): 2014, 2018
- Big East Conference tournament: 2022
- Missouri Valley Conference regular season (12): 1992, 1993, 1994, 1995, 1996, 2003, 2006, 2007, 2008, 2010, 2011, 2012
- Missouri Valley Conference tournament (13): 1992, 1993, 1994, 1995, 1997, 1998, 2000, 2002, 2005, 2006, 2008, 2011, 2012

=== NCAA appearances ===
- Division I tournament (23): 1992, 1993, 1994, 1995, 1996, 1997, 1998, 1999, 2000, (Note: Season runners-up.) 2001, 2002, 2003, 2004, 2005, 2006, 2007, 2008, 2010, 2011, 2012, 2013, 2014, 2015, 2016, 2021, 2022

== Record by year ==
Season	Coach	Overall	Conference	Standing	Postseason
Creighton (Division I Independent) (1979–1985)
1979	Mark Schmechel	12–5–1			
1980	Mark Schmechel	13–7–1			
1981	Wayne Rasmussen	9–6–3			
1982	Wayne Rasmussen	7–8–2			
1983	Wayne Rasmussen	8–9–1			
1984	Don Klosterman	4–9–1			
1985	Don Klosterman	5–12–0			
Creighton (Inactive) (1986–1989)
1986–89	No Team				
Creighton (Division I Independent) (1990–only)
1990	Bob Warming	12–5–3			
Creighton (Missouri Valley Conference) (1991–2012)
1991	Bob Warming	12–5–2	3–1–0	2nd	
1992	Bob Warming	14–3–1	4–0–1	1st	Lost 1st round
1993	Bob Warming	19–1–0	5–0–0	1st	Lost 1st round
1994	Bob Warming	15–5–1	5–1–0	1st	Lost 2nd round
1995	Bret Simon	14–3–1	4–0–1	1st	Lost 1st round
1996	Bret Simon	17–5–2	5–0–0	1st	3rd Place
1997	Bret Simon	16–5–1	6–1–0	2nd	Lost 2nd round
1998	Bret Simon	16–4–2	4–1–2	2nd	Lost Elite 8
1999	Bret Simon	11–5–2	5–1–1	2nd	Lost 1st Round
2000	Bret Simon	22–4–0	9–2–0	2nd	NCAA Runner-up
2001	Bob Warming	11–9–1	6–3–0	3rd (tie)	Lost 1st round
2002	Bob Warming	18–4–2	7–1–1	2nd	3rd Place
2003	Bob Warming	12–6–4	7–1–1	1st	Lost Elite 8
2004	Bob Warming	14–4–2	6–3–0	2nd	Lost Sweet 16
2005	Bob Warming	15–5–3	5–2–0	2nd	Lost Elite 8
2006	Bob Warming	13–5–3	4–1–1	1st (tie)	Lost 1st round
2007	Bob Warming	12–3–5	4–0–2	1st (tie)	Lost Sweet 16
2008	Bob Warming	16–2–2	4–0–1	1st	Lost Elite 8
2009	Bob Warming	7–4–5	4–2–4	4th	
2010	Jamie Clark	13–5–2	5–1–1	1st	Lost 2nd round
2011	Elmar Bolowich	21–2–1	5–1–0	1st (tie)	3rd Place
2012	Elmar Bolowich	18–4–2	5–0–1	1st	3rd Place
Creighton (Big East Conference) (2013–present)
2013	Elmar Bolowich	9–9–2	4–4–1	5th	Lost 1st round
2014	Elmar Bolowich	16–3–3	7–1–1	1st	Lost Elite 8
2015	Elmar Bolowich	19–4–0	8–3–0	2nd	Lost Elite 8
2016	Elmar Bolowich	13–7–3	5–3–1	4th	Lost 3rd round
2017	Elmar Bolowich	12–7–2	3–4–2	6th	
2018	Johnny Torres	11–4–3	7–1–1	1st	
2019	Johnny Torres	8–7–2	4–4–1	5th	
2020	Johnny Torres	6–6–0	5–3–0	2nd, Midwest	
2021	Johnny Torres	9–8–2	5–4–1	4th	NCAA 2nd round
2022	Johnny Torres	13–4–6	3–3–4	6th	Big East champions NCAA College Cup
2023	Johnny Torres	4–7–6	3–3–2	2nd, Midwest	
2024	Johnny Torres	9–6–3	4–3–1	2nd, Midwest	
Total:		525–222–88			
National champion Postseason invitational champion Conference regular season champion Conference regular season and conference tournament champion Division regular season champion Division regular season and conference tournament champion Conference tournament champion
