= Charles Auguste =

Canadian-Haitian footballer (born 1999)

Personal information
- Date of birth: 25 November 1999 (age 26)
- Place of birth: Montreal, Quebec, Canada
- Height: 1.78 m (5 ft 10 in)
- Position: Midfielder

Team information
- Current team: FC Supra du Québec
- Number: 2

Youth career
- CS St-Hubert

College career
Years	Team	Apps	(Gls)
2017–2018	Collège Ahuntsic Indiens		
2019–2022	Creighton Bluejays	63	(9)

Senior career*
Years	Team	Apps	(Gls)
2017–2019	CS St-Hubert	42	(3)
2021–2022	Chicago FC United	17	(1)
2023	Houston Dynamo	0	(0)
2023	→ Houston Dynamo 2 (loan)	20	(1)
2025	CS St-Laurent	11	(0)
2026–	FC Supra du Québec	15	(0)

International career^{‡}
2017	Haiti U20	1	(0)
- * Club domestic league appearances and goals as of 17 August 2026 ‡ National team caps and goals as of 1 March 2023

Charles Auguste (born 25 November 1999) is a professional footballer who plays as a midfielder who plays for FC Supra du Québec in the Canadian Premier League. Born in Canada, he is a former youth international for Haiti.

== Early life ==
Auguste played youth soccer with CS St-Hubert.

== College career ==
In 2017 and 2018, he attended Collège Ahuntsic. He was a two-time RSEQ All-Star and was named to the Championship All-Star team in 2018 after helping them to a silver medal at the 2018 CCAA National Championship.

In 2019, he committed to Creighton University to play for the men's soccer team. On September 6, 2019, he recorded his first collegiate point with an assist against the Akron Zips and recorded his first goal on September 9, scoring a header off of a corner kick against the Columbia Lions. In March 2021, he was named the Big East Conference Offensive Player of the Week. At the end of his sophomore season, he was named to the All-BIG EAST Second Team. In September 2021, he was once again named the Big East Offensive Player of the Week. At the end of his junior season, he was named to the All-Big East Third Team. In October 2022, he was again named the Big East Offensive Player of the Week and was named to the All-Big East First Team at the end of the season.

== Club career ==
From 2017 to 2019, he played with CS St-Hubert in the Première ligue de soccer du Québec.

In 2021 and 2022, he played with Chicago FC United in USL League Two.

Auguste made himself eligible for the 2023 MLS SuperDraft, but was declared ineligible. He was signed off waivers by the Major League Soccer side Houston Dynamo, signing a professional contract. He made his debut on May 10, 2023, in a US Open Cup match against Sporting Kansas City.

In December 2025, he signed with FC Supra du Québec in the Canadian Premier League.

== International career ==
Born in Canada, Auguste is of Haitian descent. He was called up to the Haiti U20s for a training camp in July 2017, where he made one appearance.

== Playing style ==
Auguste is a midfielder. He has been regarded for his leadership qualities and well-rounded skills.

== Career statistics ==
As of September 23, 2025

Club statistics
Club	Season	League			Playoffs		Domestic Cup		Other		Total	
Club	Season	Division	Apps	Goals	Apps	Goals	Apps	Goals	Apps	Goals	Apps	Goals
CS St-Hubert	2017	Première ligue de soccer du Québec	11	0	—		—		2	0	13	0
CS St-Hubert	2018	Première ligue de soccer du Québec	19	0	—		—		2	1	21	1
CS St-Hubert	2019	Première ligue de soccer du Québec	12	3	—		—		0	0	12	3
CS St-Hubert	Total		42	3	0	0	0	0	4	1	46	4
Chicago FC United	2021	USL League Two	6	0	0	0	—		—		6	0
Chicago FC United	2022	USL League Two	11	1	2	0	0	0	—		13	1
Chicago FC United	Total		17	1	2	0	0	0	0	0	19	1
Houston Dynamo FC	2023	Major League Soccer	0	0	0	0	1	0	0	0	1	0
Houston Dynamo 2	2023	MLS Next Pro	20	1	1	0	–		–		21	1
CS Saint-Laurent	2025	Ligue1 Québec	11	0	–		–		1	0	12	0
Career total			90	5	3	0	1	0	5	1	99	6
