= DePaul Blue Demons men's soccer =

American college soccer team

DePaul Blue Demons Men's Soccer
- 2023 DePaul Blue Demons Men's Soccer Team
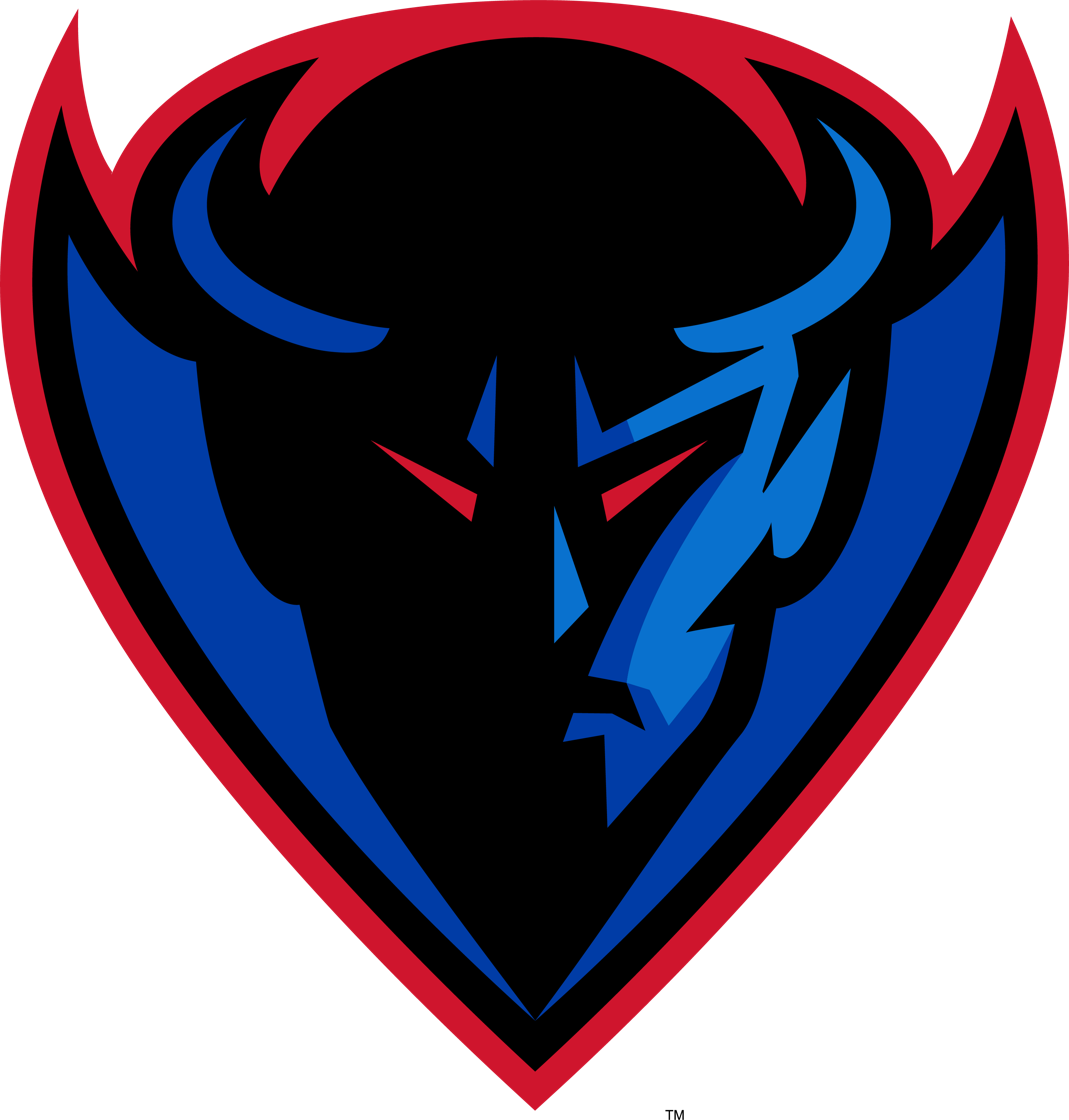
- Founded: 1982; 44 years ago
- University: DePaul University
- Head coach: Mark Plotkin (8th season)
- Conference: Big East
- Location: Chicago, Illinois, US
- Stadium: Wish Field (capacity: 1,500)
- Nickname: Blue Demons
- Colors: Royal blue and scarlet
Home	Away

NCAA tournament appearances
- 2008

Conference regular season championships
- 2007

The DePaul Blue Demons men's soccer team is the intercollegiate soccer program representing DePaul University. The school competes in the Big East Conference in Division I of the National Collegiate Athletic Association (NCAA). The team plays on campus in Lincoln Park, Chicago, Illinois at Wish Field.

== Seasons ==
=== Year-by-year ===
National champions †	Conference champions *	Division champions ‡	NCAA Tournament berth ^

Season	Head coach	Conference	Season results							Tournament results	
Season	Head coach	Conference	Overall			Conference				Conference	NCAA
Season	Head coach	Conference	W	L	T	W	L	T	Finish	Conference	NCAA
1982	Tim Hankinson	Independent	0	15	1	—	—	—	—	—	—
1983	Sandor Szabo	Independent	10	1	0	—	—	—	—	—	—
1984	Sandor Szabo	Independent	10	10	0	—	—	—	—	—	—
1985	Sandor Szabo	Independent	9	10	1	—	—	—	—	—	—
1986	Sandor Szabo	Independent	9	8	0	—	—	—	—	—	—
1987	Dan Coughlin	Independent	2	19	0	—	—	—	—	—	—
1988	Dan Coughlin	Independent	3	17	2	—	—	—	—	—	—
1989	Dan Coughlin	Independent	5	15	2	—	—	—	—	—	—
1990	John Barrett	Independent	5	13	0	—	—	—	—	—	—
1991	John Barrett	Great Midwest	1	15	2	1	4	0	5th / 6	—	—
1992	John Barrett	Great Midwest	6	11	2	1	4	0	5th / 6	—	—
1993	John Barrett	Great Midwest	4	12	4	1	3	2	4th / 6	Semifinals	—
1994	John Barrett	Great Midwest	12	5	1	3	2	1	3rd / 6th	Semifinals	—
1995	John Barrett	Conference USA	7	10	1	1	6	1	8th / 9	First round	—
1996	John Barrett	Conference USA	8	10	1	2	6	0	7th / 9	Quarterfinals	—
1997	John Barrett	Conference USA	6	12	0	1	7	0	9th / 9	First round	—
1998	John Barrett	Conference USA	5	13	0	1	7	0	9th / 9	First round	—
1999	Tom Secco	Conference USA	7	8	0	3	5	0	7th / 9	—	—
2000	Tom Secco	Conference USA	1	16	0	0	8	0	9th / 9	—	—
2001	Craig Blazer	Conference USA	3	13	2	2	6	2	11th / 11	—	—
2002	Craig Blazer	Conference USA	8	9	2	4	6	0	8th / 11	—	—
2003	Craig Blazer	Conference USA	8	11	0	4	5	0	8th / 11	—	—
2004	Craig Blazer	Conference USA	3	14	3	1	7	1	10th / 10	—	—
2005	Craig Blazer	Big East	4	11	2	2	8	1	8th, Red	—	—
2006	Craig Blazer	Big East	5	12	2	4	7	0	6th, Red	First round	—
2007‡	Craig Blazer	Big East	12	8	0	7	4	0	1st, Red‡	Semifinals	—
2008^	Craig Blazer	Big East	9	7	4	5	4	2	3rd, Red	Semifinals	First round
2009	Craig Blazer	Big East	8	9	3	5	6	0	5th, Red	Quarterfinals	—
2010	Craig Blazer	Big East	4	10	5	1	6	3	6th, Red	First round	—
2011	Craig Blazer	Big East	6	11	2	3	6	1	6th, Red	First round	—
2012	Craig Blazer	Big East	4	10	3	1	6	1	8th, Red	—	—
2013	Craig Blazer	Big East	5	11	2	1	7	1	10th / 10	—	—
2014	Craig Blazer	Big East	4	10	4	1	5	2	9th / 10	—	—
2015	Craig Blazer	Big East	5	13	1	4	4	1	6th / 10	First round	—
2016	Craig Blazer	Big East	9	7	3	4	5	0	6th / 10	First round	—
2017	Craig Blazer	Big East	5	11	2	2	6	1	9th / 10	—	—
2018	Mark Plotkin	Big East	5	9	3	2	5	2	7th / 10	—	—
2019	Mark Plotkin	Big East	5	9	3	1	5	3	10th / 10	—	—
2020–21	Mark Plotkin	Big East	2	5	2	2	5	0	4th, MW	—	—
2021	Mark Plotkin	Big East	7	7	3	3	4	3	8th / 11	—	—
2022	Mark Plotkin	Big East	4	6	7	1	4	5	9th / 11	—	—
2023	Mark Plotkin	Big East	3	7	5	1	4	3	5th, MW	—	—
2024	Mark Plotkin	Big East	6	8	3	2	4	2	3rd, MW	First round	—
2025	Mark Plotkin	Big East	2	8	7	0	6	2	6th, MW	—	—

=== NCAA Tournament history ===
DePaul has appeared in one NCAA Tournament. Their most recent performance came in 2008. Their combined NCAA record is 0–1–0.

Season	Round	Opponent	Score
2008	First round	Bradley	0–2

== Memorial ==
Chase Stegall (November 9, 2004 – June 2, 2025) was a midfielder who played for the DePaul men's soccer team from 2023 to 2024. He was the son of former NFL and CFL player Milt Stegall as well as his mother Darlene. He was a native of Atlanta, Georgia. Chase was the older brother of Colin Stegall.

As a freshman in 2023 Stegall did not see any playtime. However, for the 2024 season he played in 16 out of 17 games, scoring a goal against Drake on September 2. He would see 369 minutes of playing time.

A sophomore aged only 20, Stegall was found unresponsive in his dorm room in Lincoln Park on the morning of June 2, 2025 and was pronounced dead at the scene. It was published by Stegall on the DePaul website in February that he had a history of seizures. An autopsy at the Cook County medical examiner's office was scheduled. On August 8 it was announced on the DePaul Athletics Instagram page that the team would wear #19 patches on all kits for the 2025 season to honor Stegall.

The cause of death was announced on September 3 as a "sudden unexpected death in epilepsy", also known as SUDEP.
