= 2016 Big Ten Conference men's soccer season =

- League: NCAA Division I
- Sport: Soccer
- Duration: August, 2016 – November, 2016
- Teams: 9

2017 MLS SuperDraft
- Top draft pick: Chris Odoi-Atsem, Maryland
- Picked by: D.C. United, 12th overall

Regular season
- Season champions: Maryland
- Runners-up: Indiana
- Season MVP: FW: Gordon Wild; MF: Tanner Thompson; DF: Alex Crognale; GK: Cody Niedermeier
- Top scorer: Gordon Wild (17)

Tournament
- Champions: Maryland
- Runners-up: Wisconsin

Big Ten Conference men's soccer seasons
- ← 2015 2017 →

2016 Big Ten Conference men's soccer standings
	Conf.					Overall
Team	W		L		T	W		L		T
No. 7 Maryland ‡	7	–	0	–	1	18	–	1	–	2
No. 9 Indiana +	3	–	0	–	5	12	–	2	–	7
Wisconsin	4	–	2	–	2	11	–	4	–	4
No. 25 Michigan State +	4	–	3	–	1	13	–	5	–	2
Penn State	4	–	4	–	0	8	–	8	–	2
Ohio State	3	–	4	–	1	5	–	13	–	1
Northwestern	3	–	4	–	1	6	–	11	–	1
Michigan	1	–	6	–	1	4	–	11	–	4
Rutgers	0	–	6	–	2	1	–	14	–	2
‡-Tournament champion +- Invited to the NCAA Division I Men's Soccer Championship; As of 13 December 2016; Rankings from NSCAA

The 2016 Big Ten Conference men's soccer season was the 26th season of men's varsity soccer in the conference.

The Ohio State Buckeyes and the Maryland Terrapins are the defending regular season and tournament champions, respectively.

== Preseason ==
=== Preseason poll ===
The preseason poll was released on August 17.

	Team ranking
1.	Maryland
2.	Indiana
3.	Ohio State
4.	Rutgers
5.	Michigan
6.	Michigan State
7.	Wisconsin
8.	Penn State
9.	Northwestern

== Teams ==
=== Stadia and locations ===
Team	Location	Stadium	Capacity
Indiana Hoosiers	Bloomington, Indiana	Armstrong Stadium	6,000
Maryland Terrapins	College Park, Maryland	Ludwig Field	7,500
Michigan Wolverines	Ann Arbor, Michigan	U-M Soccer Stadium	2,200
Michigan State Spartans	East Lansing, Michigan	DeMartin Soccer Complex	2,500
Northwestern Wildcats	Evanston, Illinois	Martin Stadium	2,000
Ohio State Buckeyes	Columbus, Ohio	Owens Memorial Stadium	10,000
Penn State Nittany Lions	State College, Pennsylvania	Jeffrey Field	5,000
Rutgers Scarlet Knights	Piscataway, New Jersey	Yurcak Field	5,000
Wisconsin Badgers	Madison, Wisconsin	McClimon Stadium	2,000

- Illinois, Iowa, Minnesota, Nebraska and Purdue do not sponsor men's soccer

=== Personnel ===
Team	Head coach	Shirt supplier
Indiana	(United States) Todd Yeagley	(Germany) Adidas
Maryland	(North Macedonia) Sasho Cirovski	(United States) Under Armour
Michigan	(Canada) Chaka Daley	(United States) Nike
Michigan State	(United States) Damon Rensing	(United States) Nike
Northwestern	(United States) Tim Lenahan	(United States) Under Armour
Ohio State	(United States) John Bluem	(United States) Nike
Penn State	(United States) Bob Warming	(United States) Nike
Rutgers	(United States) Dan Donigan	(Germany) Adidas
Wisconsin	(United States) John Trask	(United States) Under Armour

== Regular season ==
=== Results ===
Team/opponent	IND	UMD	MCH	MSU	NWU	OSU	PSU	RUT	WIS
Indiana		1–1	2–0	2–1	0–0	2–2	1–0	0–0	0–0
Maryland	1–1		3–2	2–0	4–0	2–0	3–2	2–1	3–2
Michigan	0–2	2–3		0–1	1–2	0–1	2–0	1–1	1–2
Michigan State	1–2	0–2	1–0		2–1	1–0	0–1	4–0	1–1
Northwestern	0–0	0–4	2–1	1–2		0–1	1–0	2–1	1–2
Ohio State	2–2	0–2	1–0	0–1	1–0		2–4	3–1	1–2
Penn State	0–1	2–3	0–2	1–0	0–1	4–2		3–2	2–1
Rutgers	0–0	1–2	1–1	0–4	1–2	1–3	2–3		0–1
Wisconsin	0–0	2–3	2–1	1–1	2–1	2–1	1–2	1–0	

=== Rankings ===
Legend
Increase in ranking
Decrease in ranking
Not ranked previous week

		Pre	Wk 1	Wk 2	Wk 3	Wk 4	Wk 5	Wk 6	Wk 7	Wk 8	Wk 9	Wk 10	Wk 11	Wk 12	Final
Indiana	C	15	5	4	3	4	6	6	9	7	10	8	7	6	9
Maryland	C	4	7	5	4	1	1	1	1	1	1	1	1	1	7
Michigan	C														
Michigan State	C					22	25	21	19	20	13	15	12	13	25
Northwestern	C														
Ohio State	C	18	RV	NR											
Penn State	C		RV	RV	NR										
Rutgers	C	25	RV	NR											
Wisconsin	C					RV	NR			RV	24	20	18	25	RV

== Postseason ==
=== Big Ten tournament ===
Semifinals
1	Maryland	2
4	Michigan State	1
2	Indiana	1 (3)
3	Wisconsin (pen.)	1 (4)

Final
1	Maryland	2
3	Wisconsin	1

=== NCAA tournament ===
Seed	Region	School	1st round	2nd round	3rd round
1	1	Maryland	BYE	L, 4–5 vs. Providence – (College Park)	
7	4	Indiana	BYE	W 1–0 vs. Akron – (Bloomington)	L, 1–2 (OT) vs. Virginia Tech – (Bloomington)
—	4	Michigan State	T, 1–1 ^{L, 8–9 pen.} vs. SIUE – (Lansing)		

== All-Big Ten awards and teams ==
2016 Big Ten Men's Soccer Individual Awards
Award	Recipient(s)
Coach of the Year	Sasho Cirovski, Maryland
Offensive Player of the Year	Gordon Wild, Maryland
Defensive Player of the Year	Alex Crognale, Maryland
Midfielder of the Year	Tanner Thompson, Indiana
Goalkeeper of the Year	Cody Niedermeier, Maryland
Freshman of the Year	Giuseppe Barone, Michigan State

2016 Big Ten Men's Soccer All-Conference Teams
First Team	Second Team	Rookie Team
Gordon Wild, FW, Maryland; Francis Atuahene, FW, Michigan; Ryan Sierakowski, FW, Michigan State; Chris Mueller, FW, Wisconsin; Tanner Thompson, MF, Indiana; Amar Sejdic, MF, Maryland; Connor Maloney, MF, Penn State; Grant Lillard, DF, Indiana; Alex Crognale, DF, Maryland; Chris Odoi-Atsem, DF, Maryland; Cody Niedermeier, GK, Maryland	Richard Ballard, FW, Indiana; Nate Kohl, FW, Ohio State; Eryk Williamson, MF, Maryland; Ken Krolicki, MF, Michigan State; Abdi Mohamed, MF, Ohio State; Michael Catalano, MF, Wisconsin; Mark Segbers, MF, Wisconsin; Andrew Gutman, DF, Indiana; Suli Dainkeh, DF, Maryland; Lars Eckenrode, DF, Michigan; Jimmy Fiscus, DF, Michigan State; Robby Sagel, DF, Penn State; Sam Brotherton, DF, Wisconsin; Jimmy Hague, GK, Michigan State	Jack Hallahan, FW, Michigan; Giuseppe Barone, MF, Michigan State; Noah Leibold, MF, Wisconsin; Tim McQuaid, MF, Rutgers; Michael Pimlott, MF, Michigan State; Pierre Reedy, MF, Penn State; Mattias Tomasino, MF, Northwestern; Elan Koenig, DF, Wisconsin; Donovan Pines, DF, Maryland; Michael Wetungu, DF, Michigan State; Parker Siegfried, GK, Ohio State

== See also ==
- Big Ten Conference
- 2016 Big Ten Conference Men's Soccer Tournament
- 2016 NCAA Division I men's soccer season
- 2016 in American soccer
