= Soony Saad =

Association football player (born 1992)

- Saad with Lebanon in 2023

Personal information
- Full name: Hassan Ali Saad
- Date of birth: August 17, 1992 (age 34)
- Place of birth: Wyandotte, Michigan, United States
- Height: 5 ft 10 in (1.78 m)
- Position: Forward

Youth career
- 2003–2007: Michigan Wolves
- 2007–2008: Vardar
- 2008–2009: IMG Academy Bradenton
- 2009–2010: Derby County Wolves

College career
Years	Team	Apps	(Gls)
2010	Michigan Wolverines	24	(19)

Senior career*
Years	Team	Apps	(Gls)
2011–2014	Sporting Kansas City	58	(8)
2015–2016	BEC Tero Sasana	0	(0)
2016	→ Pattaya United (loan)	28	(9)
2017	Sporting Kansas City	12	(0)
2017	→ Swope Park Rangers (loan)	2	(1)
2018	Indy Eleven	29	(5)
2019–2020	Ansar	11	(6)
2020	Ansan Greeners	11	(0)
2021	Al-Wehdat	16	(2)
2021–2022	PT Prachuap	3	(0)
2022–2023	Penang	18	(6)
Total		188	(37)

International career
2008–2009	United States U17	7	(2)
2010	United States U20	1	(1)
2013–2024	Lebanon	38	(7)
- * Club domestic league appearances and goals

Hassan Ali "Soony" Saad (/ˈsuːni ˈsɑːd/ SOO-nee SAHD; Arabic: حسن علي "سوني" سعد, [ˈħasan ˈʕali ˈsoːni ˈsaʕad]; born August 17, 1992) is a former professional soccer player who played as a forward. Born in the United States, he played for the Lebanon national team.

Saad began his senior career with Major League Soccer (MLS) side Sporting Kansas City in 2011, with whom he won the 2012 U.S. Open Cup and 2013 MLS Cup. He moved to Thailand with BEC Tero Sasana before their 2015 season. However, due to an injury, he did not appear for the club, and was sent out on loan to Pattaya United in the 2016 season. Saad returned to Sporting KC in 2017, and was sent on loan to their affiliate club Swope Park Rangers, before joining Indy Eleven in 2018. He then moved back to Asia, playing for Ansar in Lebanon, Ansan Greeners in South Korea, Al-Wehdat in Jordan, PT Prachuap in Thailand, and Penang in Malaysia.

A former United States youth international, Saad represented Lebanon at the senior level from 2013 to 2024. During his international career, Saad competed in the 2023 Asian Cup, the 2018 and 2022 World Cup qualifiers, the 2015 and 2019 Asian Cup qualifiers, and the 2019 WAFF Championship.

== Early life ==
Saad was born in Wyandotte, Michigan, and grew up in nearby Dearborn, a city with a sizeable Arab-American community. He holds both American and Lebanese citizenship, the latter through paternal descent. His father, Ali, emigrated from Lebanon to the United States in the 1980s, fleeing the Lebanese Civil War, and later met Kristene, his future wife, at the University of Michigan–Dearborn. Saad has two older sisters, Summar and Hannan, and one older brother, Hamoody.

Saad credited his father as being "integral to his development" as a soccer player, having coached him and his siblings during their childhood. He attended Maples Elementary School in Dearborn.

== Youth and college career ==
=== Early career ===
Saad began his youth career at the Michigan Wolves, Derby County Wolves's academy team, joining their under-12s. He led them to the 2007 U.S. Youth Soccer National Championship and was awarded the Golden Boot Award for Most Outstanding Player.

Saad later joined Vardar's U15/U16 team; in 2008, he was nominated U.S. Soccer Development Academy U-16 Player of the Year. A Dearborn High School student, Saad left in fall 2008 to join the U.S. U17 Residency Program in Bradenton, Florida.

=== Derby County Wolves and Dearborn High School ===
In summer 2009, Saad returned to the Derby County Wolves, and moved back to Dearborn High School for his senior year.

With Dearborn, Saad set a state single-season record with 76 goals in his 2009 season, while concluding his time in high school with a Michigan record of 172 goals and 51 assists. He broke the previous state high school single-season goals record of 69 set in 2000, and previous state high school career goals record of 169 set in 1995. Saad also earned the 2009 Michigan Soccer Coaches Association "Mr. Soccer" Title, and was named the 2010 Gatorade National Player of the Year.

At age 17, Saad received an offer to join German club Mainz 05, then managed by Thomas Tuchel. After featuring in a preseason friendly, he was offered a three-year professional contract worth €3,000 per month. However, he declined the deal in favor of accepting a scholarship to play collegiate soccer for the University of Michigan's Wolverines.

=== Michigan Wolverines ===
"We knew there was a connection between these two (brothers), and you don't get that connection very often. They innately know where one another are (on the field), and they know how to use one another."

— Michigan Wolverines head coach Steve Burns on Soony and Hamoody Saad scoring on their debut in the 2010 season.

Saad joined the Michigan Wolverines ahead of the 2010 season, playing alongside his older brother Hamoody. In their debut game, both Soony and Hamoody scored in a 2–1 victory over Detroit, with Soony's goal coming off a free kick.

He had a successful freshman season, scoring 19 goals in 24 games, surpassing the previous record of 14 for most goals by a freshman at the University of Michigan, while setting records for shots and overall points. He helped the team win their first Big Ten Soccer Tournament and was named Big Ten Freshman of the Year.

Saad left school after his freshman year to seek a professional contract with a European team. However, he was unable to secure a move to a club in Europe; Saad returned to the United States and trained with the NSC Minnesota Stars of the North American Soccer League.

== Club career ==
=== Sporting Kansas City ===
==== 2011: Debut season ====
"I'm a forward so scoring goals is always something in my mind. This is amazing to get a goal on my birthday, my debut. I'm just happy that I came in and was able to help the team."

— Saad on scoring his debut goal for Sporting Kansas City on his 19th birthday.

In June 2011, Saad signed a professional contract with Major League Soccer (MLS). On July 5, 2011, he was allocated to Sporting Kansas City through a weighted lottery that was used to distribute players who signed with the league after the MLS SuperDraft.

Saad made his MLS debut on August 17, 2011, on his 19th birthday. He scored a goal in the 72nd minute, just nine minutes after he came on, becoming the youngest goalscorer in club history.

Saad also netted two more goals for Sporting KC in MLS Reserve League games against the Colorado Rapids and FC Dallas, and scored once in a friendly against Guadalajara on October 12, 2011.

==== 2012–2014: MLS Cup and Open Cup winner ====
Saad was part of the Kansas City side that won the 2012 U.S. Open Cup, taking part in the final against Seattle Sounders FC, which was decided in a penalty shootout. He had scored a brace against Orlando City in the third round of the competition. Saad played nine games in the 2012 MLS season.

Saad's breakout year came during the 2013 season, scoring four goals and making four assists in 23 games in the regular season. He took part in Sporting's first-ever CONCACAF Champions League match on August 8, 2013; Saad played as a starter against Real Estelí of Nicaragua in the group stage in a 2–0 win. His first Champions League goals came on August 28, scoring both goals in a 2–0 win against Honduran side Olimpia. Saad played twice in the 2013 MLS Cup Playoffs, which Sporting KC won.

Despite not being a regular starter during the 2014 MLS season, Saad played 22 games and scored three times, and helped Kansas City reach the Playoffs for a fourth consecutive year. He also scored two goals in two Open Cup games. His contract expired at the end of the season, with Sporting KC reserving the right to sign him in the future. Throughout his four-season stint, Saad tallied 14 goals and seven assists in 71 appearances for Sporting – eight goals and six assists in 58 MLS regular season games.

=== Move to Thailand ===
Following the end of his contract with Sporting Kansas City, Saad signed with Thai club BEC Tero Sasana in October 2014, ahead of the 2015 season. He cited his goal scored with the Lebanon national team against Thailand the same year in the 2015 AFC Asian Cup qualifiers as the reason for the club's interest in him. Due to an injury, Saad was unable to play in his first season at the club.

After recovering from his injury, on March 2, 2016, Saad scored a penalty in a 1–0 preseason friendly win for BEC Tero Sasana against Samut Sakhon. He was sent out on loan to Pattaya United for the 2016 Thai League 1 season; Saad scored nine goals and made nine assists in 28 league appearances, helping his side avoid relegation to the Thai League 2.

=== Return to the United States ===
"We feel that bringing Soony back at this time is a great fit for us. There are certain aspects of his game that can really help us in areas of the field where we need additional support. We are excited to see how his game has matured over the past two years and look forward to working with him again."

— Sporting Kansas City head coach Peter Vermes on Saad's return to the club in 2017.

On January 30, 2017, Sporting Kansas City announced the re-acquisition of Saad on a two-year contract for the 2017 and 2018 seasons, with an option for extension for the 2019 season. He made his second debut for the club against the San Jose Earthquakes on March 19, being brought on as a substitute; similarly to his first debut for Sporting in 2011, Saad helped his side win on his first game, with his 89th-minute shot being deflected into the goal by opposing goalkeeper David Bingham.

After being sent on loan to Swope Park Rangers, a USL Championship club affiliated with Sporting KC, Saad was waived during the 2018 preseason. On February 21, 2018, Saad joined fellow USL Championship side Indy Eleven, where he scored five league goals in 29 appearances.

=== Ansar ===
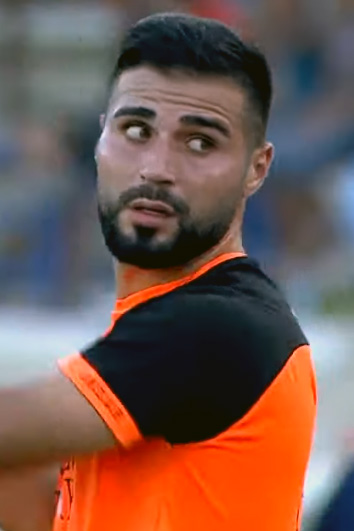
Saad with Ansar in 2019

On January 18, 2019, Lebanese club Ansar announced the signing of Saad on a six-month contract. On his debut game in the 2018–19 Lebanese Premier League, played on January 27, he scored and assisted once against Safa. On February 15, Saad scored from a 30-meter free kick in a 4–0 win against Salam Zgharta. This was the first time in over two years that the Beirut Municipal Stadium hosted a game. On May 10, Saad scored in the quarter-finals of the Lebanese FA Cup, helping his side defeat Nejmeh in the Beirut derby.

In his first year at the club Saad scored six league goals in 10 games with Ansar, as well as one cup goal, finishing second in both the league and the cup. On May 29, Ansar renewed Saad's contract for two seasons.

Saad's only goals of the 2019–20 season came on August 18, 2019, when he scored his only brace for Ansar in a 5–0 win over Chabab Ghazieh in the 2019 Lebanese Elite Cup semi-final. Saad was released by Ansar in March 2020 due to financial disagreements with the club, in the midst of the Lebanese liquidity crisis.

=== Ansan Greeners ===
On March 27, 2020, Saad moved to K League 2 side Ansan Greeners. He had already played in Ansan's home stadium, Ansan Wa~ Stadium, four years prior for the Lebanon national team, in a 2018 FIFA World Cup qualification game against South Korea. Saad made his debut for his new club on May 23, coming on as a substitute in the second half against Bucheon. His first-minute debut came three days later, on May 26, in a 1–0 defeat against Daejeon Hana Citizen. Saad played 11 games in the 2020 season.

=== Al-Wehdat ===
On March 27, 2021, Saad joined Al-Wehdat in the Jordanian Pro League on a one-year contract, reuniting with fellow Lebanese player Ahmad Zreik and former Ansar coach Abdullah Abu Zema.

He made his debut on April 4, helping his side win the Jordan Super Cup by beating Al-Jazeera 2–0. On April 14, Saad made his AFC Champions League debut against Saudi Arabian side Al Nassr, drawing 0–0. His first goal came on April 29, scoring the lone goal against Iranian club Foolad in the AFC Champions League; he became the second Lebanese player to score in the competition, following Zreik's goal three days prior.

Saad made his league debut on May 4, as a second-half substitute in a 1–0 home win against Al-Jalil. He scored his first league goal on July 27, helping his team beat Shabab Al-Aqaba 4–1. On August 25, Saad scored in the 2021 Jordan FA Cup round of 16 against Al-Jalil, which Al-Wehdat won 4–0. Saad finished the season with four goals and three assists in 26 games.

=== PT Prachuap ===
On December 4, 2021, Saad returned to Thailand, joining PT Prachuap ahead of the second leg of the 2021–22 Thai League 1. He helped his side finish runners-up in the 2021–22 Thai League Cup, losing 4–0 to Buriram United in the final.

=== Penang ===
Saad moved to Penang in the Malaysia Super League on December 22, 2022, ahead of the 2023 season. Having played his first game on March 1, 2023, playing all 90 minutes in a 0–0 draw against Negeri Sembilan, Saad scored his first goals for Penang on March 17 and 31, in consecutive games against Sabah and Perak respectively. On April 9, Saad scored a brace to help his side win 4–2 against PDRM.

== International career ==
=== United States ===
In January 2008, Saad was called up to represent the United States internationally at the under-14 level; he played in unofficial friendlies against clubs from Mexico as part of a training camp in Guadalajara, scoring once against Jalisco's under-14s.

Saad played for the under-17 team during his stay in the U.S. Residency Program in Bradenton in 2008. In July, he was called up to a two-week training camp in Montevideo, Uruguay, without playing. Saad featured in six games against Panama, Honduras, and Guatemala as part of a Central America tour, scoring twice and assisting once. He also played in exhibition tours against club sides in the United States and France, most notably scoring against Paris Saint-Germain's under-18s. In February 2009, he played his final official game for the under-17s, in a 1–1 friendly draw against Ecuador.

Saad received a call-up to join the under-20s in December 2010. He played once in a friendly game against Canada, where he scored in a 2–0 win.

=== Lebanon ===
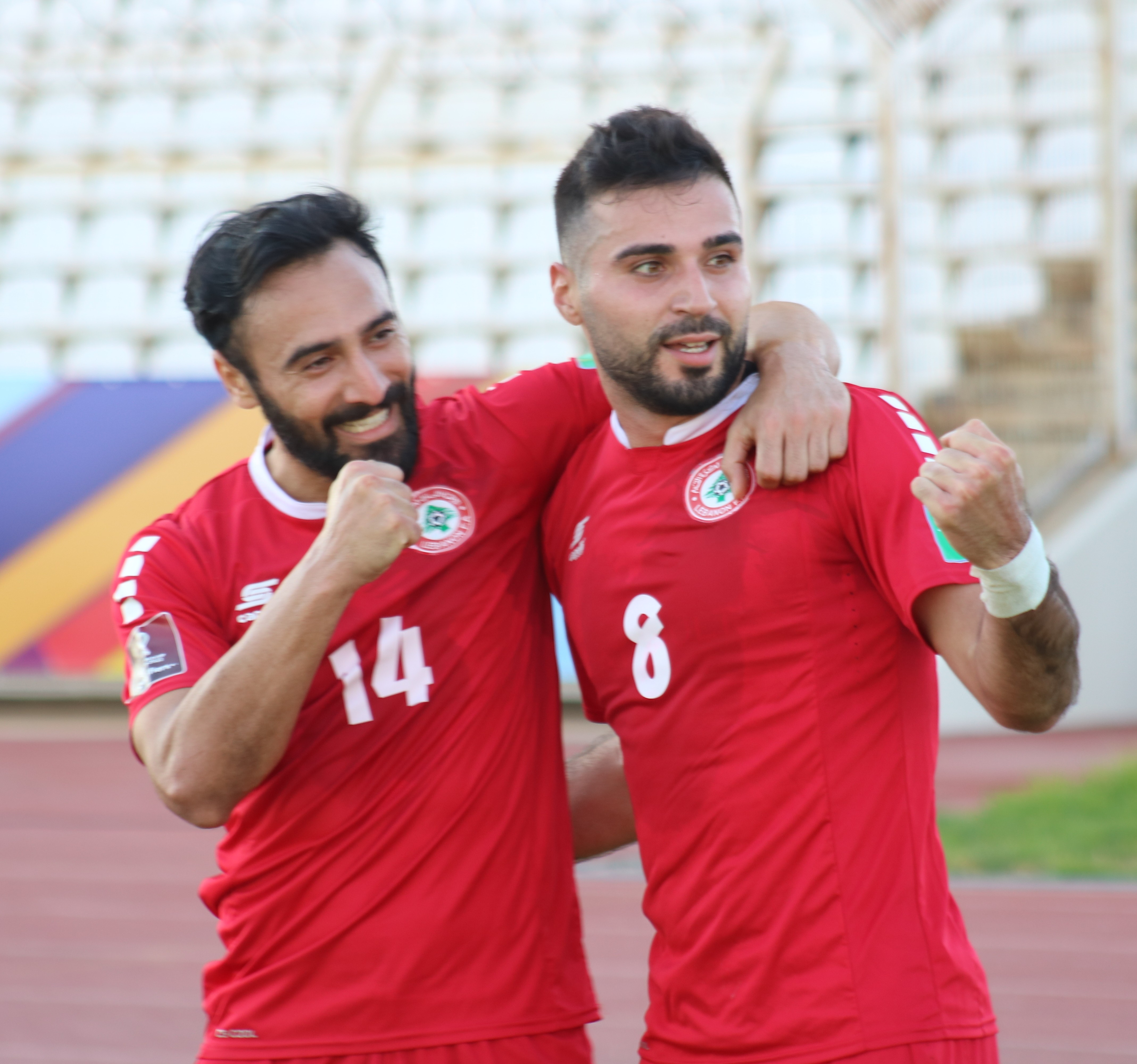
Saad (right) celebrating with teammate Nader Matar (left) after scoring for Lebanon against Iran in 2021

In May 2013, Saad obtained his Lebanese passport and became eligible to join the Lebanon national team. He accepted a call-up for a friendly against Oman scheduled for May 29. Saad joined the Lebanon national team in the process, as the first MLS player to do so. Saad made his international debut in the match and scored Lebanon's only goal in the 62nd minute in an eventual 1–1 draw. In March 2013, he scored Lebanon's third goal against Thailand in their 5–2 victory in the 2015 Asian Cup qualification and, two years later in September 2016, he scored his third for Lebanon against Afghanistan in a friendly.

On September 5, 2017, Saad traveled with Lebanon to North Korea to play in the 2019 AFC Asian Cup qualifiers. Due to the hostile relations between North Korea and the United States, Saad handed his American passport to the team manager and held on to his Lebanese one. He stated that he "grew out [his] beard to look extra Lebanese" and "spoke English in a Lebanese accent" to "hide the fact that [he] was American". Nevertheless, he noted that he did not encounter hostility from the locals, who "just saw it as a football team coming in. No politics involved, just football".

Saad played for Lebanon in the qualifiers for the 2022 FIFA World Cup; he scored two goals in the final two games of the second round in June 2021, a long-distance goal against Turkmenistan and the opening goal against South Korea. Despite losing both games, Lebanon qualified to the third (and final) round as results in other groups went in the Cedars' favor. Saad scored in Lebanon's first win of the round, a 3–2 win against Syria on October 12, to help his team climb to third place in their group. He also scored a first-half goal against Iran on November 11, and was close to earning Lebanon a historic win before Iran scored twice in stoppage time to win 2–1. Lebanon finished their group in last place with only one win in 10 games.

In December 2023, Saad was named to the Lebanese squad for the 2023 AFC Asian Cup. He participated in two group-stage matches in January 2024, facing Qatar and China. These games marked his final appearances for Lebanon, and he retired from international play with seven goals in 38 matches.

== Style of play ==
Saad started out as a striker in his youth career, and was moved out to the left wing when he transitioned to professional soccer at Sporting Kansas City. He was also sporadically used as a left-back at the international level – with positive results – during the qualifiers for the 2022 World Cup, scoring twice from that position. Saad is a creative playmaker known for scoring from long range, often from free kicks.

== Personal life ==
A practicing Muslim, Saad observes Ramadan. In March 2020, he got engaged to Lebanese actress Malak Al Haj; the couple got married in December.

== Career statistics ==
=== Club ===
Appearances and goals by club, season and competition
Club	Season	League			Playoffs		National cup (Note: Includes U.S. Open Cup, Thai FA Cup, Lebanese FA Cup, Korean FA Cup, Jordan FA Cup)		League cup (Note: Includes Thai League Cup, Lebanese Elite Cup, Jordan FA Shield, Malaysia Cup)		Continental		Other		Total	
Club	Season	Division	Apps	Goals	Apps	Goals	Apps	Goals	Apps	Goals	Apps	Goals	Apps	Goals	Apps	Goals
Sporting Kansas City	2011	Major League Soccer	4	1	2	0	—		—		—		—		6	1
Sporting Kansas City	2012	Major League Soccer	9	0	0	0	3	2	—		—		—		12	2
Sporting Kansas City	2013	Major League Soccer	23	4	2	0	0	0	—		3 (Note: Appearances in CONCACAF Champions League)	2	—		28	6
Sporting Kansas City	2014	Major League Soccer	22	3	0	0	2	2	—		2	0	—		26	5
Sporting Kansas City	Total		58	8	4	0	5	4	0	0	5	2	0	0	72	14
BEC Tero Sasana	2015	Thai Premier League	0	0	—		0	0	0	0	—		—		0	0
Pattaya United (loan)	2016	Thai League T1	28	9	—		2	1	2	1	—		—		32	11
Sporting Kansas City	2017	Major League Soccer	12	0	0	0	1	0	—		—		—		13	0
Swope Park Rangers (loan)	2017	USL Championship	2	1	—		—		—		—		—		2	1
Indy Eleven	2018	USL Championship	29	5	—		1	0	—		—		—		30	5
Ansar	2018–19	Lebanese Premier League	10	6	—		3	1	—		—		—		13	7
Ansar	2019–20	Lebanese Premier League	1	0	—		—		3	2	2 (Note: Appearances in AFC Cup)	0	1 (Note: Appearance in Lebanese Super Cup)	0	7	2
Ansar	Total		11	6	0	0	3	1	3	2	2	0	1	0	20	9
Ansan Greeners	2020	K League 2	11	0	—		1	0	—		—		—		12	0
Al-Wehdat	2021	Jordanian Pro League	16	2	—		3	1	0	0	6 (Note: Appearances in AFC Champions League)	1	1 (Note: Appearance in Jordan Super Cup)	0	26	4
PT Prachuap	2021–22	Thai League 1	3	0	—		0	0	2	0	—		—		5	0
Penang	2023	Malaysia Super League	18	6	—		2	1	0	0	—		—		20	7
Career total			188	37	4	0	18	8	7	3	13	3	2	0	232	51

=== International ===
Appearances and goals by national team and year
National team	Year	Apps	Goals
United States U17	2008	6	2
United States U17	2009	1	0
Total		7	2
United States U20	2010	1	1
Lebanon	2013	2	1
Lebanon	2014	2	1
Lebanon	2015	0	0
Lebanon	2016	4	1
Lebanon	2017	2	0
Lebanon	2018	1	0
Lebanon	2019	3	0
Lebanon	2020	1	0
Lebanon	2021	9	4
Lebanon	2022	2	0
Lebanon	2023	10	0
Lebanon	2024	2	0
Total		38	7
Career total		45	10

Scores and results list Lebanon's goal tally first, score column indicates score after each Saad goal.

List of international goals scored by Soony Saad
No.	Date	Venue	Opponent	Score	Result	Competition
1	May 29, 2013	Khalifa International Stadium, Doha, Qatar	Oman	1–1	1–1	Friendly
2	March 5, 2014	Rajamangala Stadium, Bangkok, Thailand	Thailand	3–1	5–2	2015 AFC Asian Cup qualification
3	September 5, 2016	International Olympic Stadium, Tripoli, Lebanon	Afghanistan	1–0	2–0	Friendly
4	June 9, 2021	Goyang Stadium, Goyang, South Korea	Turkmenistan	2–1	2–3	2022 FIFA World Cup qualification second round
5	June 13, 2021	Goyang Stadium, Goyang, South Korea	South Korea	1–0	1–2	2022 FIFA World Cup qualification second round
6	October 12, 2021	King Abdullah II Stadium, Amman, Jordan	Syria	3–1	3–2	2022 FIFA World Cup qualification third round
7	November 11, 2021	Saida Municipal Stadium, Sidon, Lebanon	Iran	1–0	1–2	2022 FIFA World Cup qualification third round

== Honors ==
Michigan Wolverines

- Big Ten Soccer Tournament: 2010

Sporting Kansas City

- MLS Cup: 2013
- U.S. Open Cup: 2012, 2017

Al-Wehdat

- Jordan Super Cup: 2021

PT Prachuap

- Thai League Cup runner-up: 2021–22

Individual

- Gatorade National Soccer Player of the Year: 2010
- NSCAA All-American Second Team: 2010
- NSCAA All-Great Lakes Region First Team: 2010
- All-Big Ten First Team: 2010
- Big Ten Freshman of the Year: 2010
- Big Ten Tournament Offensive Player of the Tournament: 2010

== See also ==
- List of Lebanon international footballers born outside Lebanon
- List of sportspeople who competed for more than one nation
