= 2010 Akron Zips men's soccer team =

American college soccer season

2010 Akron Zips men's soccer

National Champions

MAC Regular Season Champions MAC Men's Soccer Tournament Champions

NCAA Tournament, College Cup vs. Louisville, W 1–0
- Conference: Mid-American Conference

Ranking
- Coaches: No. 1
- Record: 22–1–2 (6–0–0 MAC)
- Head coach: Caleb Porter (4th season)
- Home stadium: Lee Jackson Field

2010 Mid-American Conference men's soccer standings
	Conf.					Overall
Team	W		L		T	W		L		T
No. 1 Akron†	6	–	0	–	0	22	–	1	–	2
Western Michigan	4	–	2	–	0	10	–	8	–	2
Buffalo	3	–	3	–	0	7	–	10	–	1
Bowling Green	3	–	3	–	0	6	–	9	–	3
Northern Illinois	2	–	4	–	0	9	–	6	–	2
Florida Atlantic	2	–	4	–	0	5	–	9	–	2
Hartwick	1	–	5	–	0	2	–	14	–	1
As of December 11, 2010; Rankings from NSCAA

The 2010 Akron Zips men's soccer team represented the University of Akron during the 2010 NCAA Division I men's soccer season. The Zips finished the season winning the 2010 NCAA Division I Men's Soccer Championship, making it the first time in their history to win the national title.

== Roster ==
The 2010 Akron Zips roster.

Note: Flags indicate national team as defined under FIFA eligibility rules; some limited exceptions apply. Players may hold more than one non-FIFA nationality.

No.	Pos.	Nation	Player
00	GK	USA	Anthony Ponikvar
2	DF	PUR	Zarek Valentin
3	DF	USA	Chad Barson
5	MF	USA	Perry Kitchen
6	MF	USA	Darlington Nagbe
7	MF	USA	Michael Balogun
8	DF	USA	Kofi Sarkodie
9	MF	USA	Michael Nanchoff
10	MF	THA	Anthony Ampaipitakwong
11	FW	JAM	Darren Mattocks
12	MF	CRC	Reinaldo Brenes
14	MF	USA	Eric Stevenson

No.	Pos.	Nation	Player
15	MF	USA	Scott Caldwell
16	DF	USA	Chris Korb
17	MF	USA	Ben Speas
18	MF	USA	Martin Ontiveros
19	FW	JAM	McKauly Tulloch
20	FW	USA	Richard Diaz, Jr.
21	FW	USA	Thomas Schmitt
22	DF	VEN	Enrique Paez
23	GK	USA	Andrian McAdams
24	GK	USA	David Meves
25	DF	USA	Matt Dagilis
28	FW	USA	Gabe Genovesi

== Match results ==
=== Key ===
Win Tie Loss

- Home team is listed on the right

=== Preseason ===
2010-08-25	VCU	1–3	^{No. 1} Akron	Akron, Ohio
7:30 p.m.	Valentin 2' (o.g.)	Report	Sarkodie 29', 48'; Nagbe 35'	Stadium: Lee Jackson Field; Attendance: 2,385

2010-08-28	^{No. 1} Akron	1–2	^{No. 16} South Florida	Tampa, Florida
7:30 p.m.	Nagbe 79'	Report	Añor 22', 76'	Stadium: USF Soccer Stadium

=== Regular season ===
September 3	No. 1 Akron	3–0	No. 4 North Carolina	Chapel Hill, NC
7:00 p.m. EDT	Stevenson 8'; Kitchen 22'; Barson (yellow card) 55'; Nagbe 64'; Sarkodie (yellow card) 88'	Report	Ababio (yellow card) 55'; McKinney (yellow card) 64'	Stadium: Fetzer Field; Attendance: 3,125; Referee: Matt Jozadis; Assistant referees: David McPhunn; Rick Guarino; Fourth official: Ayman Nabulsi

September 5	No. 1 Akron	2–0	No. 3 Wake Forest	Winston-Salem, NC
7:00 p.m. EDT	Mattocks 15'; Sarkodie (yellow card) 38'; Nagbe 53'; Valentin (yellow card) 68'	Report	Redmond (yellow card) 38'; Arena (yellow card) 40'; Delbono (yellow card) 68'; Tulloch (yellow card) 74'; Ibikunle (yellow card) 76'	Stadium: Spry Stadium; Attendance: 4,583; Referee: Chris Penso; Assistant referees: Ross Cox; Justus Agbeko; Fourth official: Ryan Cigich

September 11	No. 1 Akron	2–0	Bowling Green	Bowling Green, OH
1:00 p.m. EDT	Sarkodie 64'; Mattocks 81' (yellow card) 90'	Report	Jurtovski (yellow card) 38'	Stadium: Cochrane Field; Attendance: 513; Referee: Karim Elfishawy; Assistant referees: Michael Allie; Derrick Mroz; Fourth official: MJ Caulfield

September 17	CSUN	0–3	No. 1 Akron	Akron, OH
7:30 p.m. EDT	Gil (yellow card) 28'; Hohn (yellow card) 42'; Bonvehi (yellow card) 84'	Report	Kitchen 5'; Nagbe 28'; Barson 43'	Stadium: Lee Jackson Field; Attendance: 4,200; Referee: Sorin Stoica; Assistant referees: Michael Allie; Derrick Mroz; Fourth official: MJ Caulfield

September 19	Cincinnati	0–1	No. 1 Akron	Akron, OH
2:30 p.m. EDT	Klosterman (yellow card) 14'	Report	Ampaipitakwong 13' (yellow card) 54'; Sarkodie (yellow card) 52'	Stadium: Lee Jackson Field; Attendance: 2,619; Referee: Niko Bratsis; Assistant referees: Islam Sallaj; Chris Penso; Fourth official: Jordan Hardwick

September 24	No. 2 Tulsa	0–4	No. 1 Akron	Akron, OH
20:00 EDT		Report	Sarkodie 9'; Kitchen 13'; Mattocks 50'; Ampaipitakwong 70'	Stadium: Lee Jackson Field; Attendance: 4,744; Referee: Abiodun Okulaja; Assistant referees: Brian Miller; Ioan Aldea; Fourth official: Carl del Corral

September 29	No. 1 Akron	2–2 (a.e.t.)	No. 19 Ohio State	Columbus, OH
19:00 EDT	Nanchoff 38'; Mattocks 68' (yellow card) 68'; Barson (yellow card) 98'	Report	McAnena 30'; Warzycha (red card) 52'; Tiemstra 90'; Scales (yellow card) 90'	Stadium: Jesse Owens Memorial Stadium; Attendance: 7,255; Referee: Benjamin Trevino; Assistant referees: Brian Apwisch; Michael Kinder; Fourth official: Trey Gaither

October 1	Florida Atlantic	0–3	No. 1 Akron	Akron, OH
17:30 EST	Merrigan (yellow card) 55'	Report	Sarkodie 10', 53'; Kitchen 11'	Stadium: Lee Jackson Field; Attendance: 3,232; Referee: Tony DeLois; Assistant referees: Brian Miller; John Safar; Fourth official: Jordan Hardwick

October 6	No. 1 Akron	5–0	Oakland	Rochester, MI
7:00 p.m.	Mattocks 3', 14'; Barson 23'; Nanchoff 25'; Tulloch 75'	Report	Lipari (yellow card) 8'; Timm (red card) 52'	Stadium: Ultimate Soccer Arenas; Attendance: 1,188; Referee: Ted Grigoriou; Assistant referees: Michael Allie; Donovan Noocha; Fourth official: Elisabeth Putnam

October 9	No. 1 Akron	1–0	Northern Illinois	DeKalb, IL
16:00 EST	Mattocks 16'; Stevenson (yellow card) 84'; Balogun (yellow card) 90'	Report	King (yellow card) 50'; Totsch (yellow card) 55'; Jor (yellow card) 57'	Stadium: NIU Soccer Complex; Attendance: 1,276; Referee: Pawel Wydra; Assistant referees: Michael Allie; Donovan Noocha; Fourth official: Elisabeth Putnam

October 13	No. 1 Akron	2–1 (a.e.t.)	Penn State	University Park, Pennsylvania
7:00 p.m.	Nagbe 7'; Nanchoff 107' (pen.)	Report	Hertzog 6'	Stadium: Jeffrey Field; Attendance: 2,856; Referee: Mark Gorak

October 16	Buffalo	0–4	No. 1 Akron	Akron, Ohio
7:30 p.m.				Stadium: Lee Jackson Field

October 19	Michigan	1–7	No. 1 Akron	Akron, Ohio
7:30 p.m.				Stadium: Lee Jackson Field

October 23	Western Michigan	1–2	No. 1 Akron	Akron, Ohio
7:30 p.m.				Stadium: Lee Jackson Field

October 27	No. 9 Creighton	0–1	No. 1 Akron	Akron, Ohio
7:30 p.m.				Stadium: Lee Jackson Field

October 30	No. 1 Akron	1–2	Cleveland State	Cleveland, Ohio
2:00 p.m.				Stadium: Krenzler Field

November 3	No. 2 Akron	1–0	Michigan State	East Lansing, Michigan
3:00 p.m.				Stadium: DeMartin Soccer Complex

November 6	No. 2 Akron	2–1	Hartwick	Oneonta, New York
7:00 p.m.				Stadium: Elmore Field

=== MAC tournament ===
Numbers in parentheses (#) represent tournament seed.

November 12 Semifinals	^{(4)} Buffalo	1–3	^{(1) No. 2} Akron	Akron, Ohio
5:00 p.m.	Gradwell (yellow card) 11'; Unwin (yellow card) 25'; Woods (yellow card) 62'; Craven 90'	Report	Nanchoff 29'; Mattocks (yellow card) 8' (goal) 69'; Caldwell 89'	Stadium: Lee Jackson Field; Attendance: 2,407; Referee: Abdu Bensalah

November 14 MAC Championship	^{(2)} Western Michigan	0–4	^{(1) No. 2} Akron	Akron, Ohio
4:00 p.m.	Lemus (yellow card) 37'	Report	Kitchen (yellow card) 44'; Nagbe 48'; Caldwell 54'; Mattocks 56', 70'	Stadium: Lee Jackson Field; Attendance: 1,867; Referee: Tony DeLois

=== NCAA tournament ===
Numbers in parentheses (#) represent tournament seed.

November 21 Second round	West Virginia	2–3	(3) No. 2 Akron	Akron, OH
4:00 p.m.	Flott (yellow card) 24'; Etuk (yellow card) 49'; Gaddis (yellow card) 56'; Sebele 81'; Tayou 86'	Box Score	Mattocks 11', 31'; Valentin (yellow card) 48'; Caldwell 70'	Stadium: Lee Jackson Field; Attendance: 2,825; Referee: Ben Traveno

November 28 Third round	(14) No. 16 Indiana	1–2	(3) No. 2 Akron	Akron, OH
4:00 p.m.	Bushue (yellow card) 28'; Adlard 82'	Report	Nanchoff 53'; Mattocks 55'	Stadium: Lee Jackson Field; Attendance: 3,225; Referee: Hilario Grajeda

December 4 Quarterfinals	(6) No. 6 California	3–3 (a.e.t.) (2–3 p)	(3) No. 2 Akron	Akron, OH
4:00 p.m.	Avalos 31'; Salciccia 57'; Fitzpatrick 89'	Report	Nanchoff 41' (yellow card) 100'; Caldwell 42'; Kitchen 76'	Stadium: Lee Jackson Field; Attendance: 3,442; Referee: Peter Dhima
	Penalties
	Jiménez (penalty missed); Soares (penalty scored); Carrasco (penalty missed); Davis (penalty missed); Avalos (penalty scored)		(penalty missed) Nanchoff; (penalty scored) Kitchen; (penalty scored) Valentin; (penalty missed) Caldwell; (penalty scored) Sarkodie

==== NCAA College Cup ====
December 10 Semifinals	(10) No. 19 Michigan	1–2	(3) No. 2 Akron	Santa Barbara, CA
11:00 p.m.	Meram 2'; Pereira (yellow card) 74'	Box Score; Report	Kitchen 33'; Sarkodie (yellow card) 41' (goal) 74'	Stadium: Harder Stadium; Attendance: 7,650; Referee: Alex Gorin

December 12 NCAA Championship	(3) No. 2 Akron	1–0	(1) No. 1 Louisville	Santa Barbara, CA
4:00 p.m.	Korb (yellow card) 56'; Caldwell 79'	Box Score; Report	Murray (yellow card) 54'; Campbell (yellow card) 84'	Stadium: Harder Stadium; Attendance: 9,672; Referee: Chico Grajeda

== Statistics ==
=== Goalscorers ===
The list is sorted by shirt number when total goals are equal.

Rnk	Pos	No.	Player	Regular season	MAC Tournament	NCAA Tournament	Total
1	FW	11	(Jamaica) Darren Mattocks	12	3	3	18
2	MF	9	(United States) Michael Nanchoff	7	1	2	10
3	DF	8	(Ghana) Kofi Sarkodie	7	0	1	8
4	FW	6	(Liberia) Darlington Nagbe	6	1	0	7
5	DF	5	(United States) Perry Kitchen	4	0	2	6
6	MF	15	(United States) Scott Caldwell	0	2	3	5
7	MF	10	(Thailand) A. Ampaipitakwong	3	0	0	3
8	DF	3	(United States) Chad Barson	2	0	0	2
8	MF	17	(United States) Ben Speas	2	0	0	2
10	MF	14	(United States) Eric Stevenson	1	0	0	1
10	MF	17	(United States) Thomas Schmitt	1	0	0	1
10	FW	19	(Jamaica) McKauly Tulloch	1	0	0	1

== Transfers ==
=== In ===
College recruiting information
Name	Hometown	School	Height	Weight	Commit date
Reinaldo Brenes; MF	Bradenton, FL	Edison Academic Center	5 ft 10 in (1.78 m)	155 lb (70 kg)	
Reinaldo Brenes; MF	Recruit ratings: No ratings found				
Richard Diaz, Jr. MF	Chesapeake, VA	Oscar F. Smith High School	5 ft 10 in (1.78 m)	155 lb (70 kg)	
Richard Diaz, Jr. MF	Recruit ratings: No ratings found				
Perry Kitchen; DF	Indianapolis, IN	IMG Academy	6 ft 0 in (1.83 m)	160 lb (73 kg)	
Perry Kitchen; DF	Recruit ratings: No ratings found				

- 11 Darren Mattocks F Fr. 6-0 165 Portmore, Jamaica / Bridgeport HS
- 23 Andrian McAdams GK Fr. 6-0 170 Oberlin, Ohio / Oberlin HS
- 18 Martin Ontiveros MF Fr. 5-9 145 Pharr, Texas / Edison Academic Center [Fla.]
- 19 McKauly Tulloch F Fr. 6-1 180 Kingston, Jamaica / St. George's College HS
