= Lee Jackson Field =

Lee Jackson Field may refer to:

- FirstEnergy Stadium-Cub Cadet Field, a college soccer venue at the University of Akron formerly known as Lee R. Jackson Soccer Field
- Lee R. Jackson Baseball Field, a college baseball venue at the University of Akron
