= 2010 Michigan Wolverines men's soccer team =

American college soccer season

2010 Michigan Wolverines men's soccer

Big Ten Tournament Champions

NCAA Tournament, College Cup
- Conference: Big Ten Conference
- U. Soc. Coaches poll: No. 4
- Record: 17–5–3 (4–2–0 Big Ten)
- Head coach: Steve Burns
- Home stadium: U-M Soccer Stadium

2010 Big Ten Conference men's soccer standings
	Conf.					Overall
Team	W		L		T	W		L		T
No. 20 Indiana +	4	–	1	–	1	10	–	8	–	2
No. 4 Michigan ‡	4	–	2	–	0	17	–	5	–	3
No. 17 Ohio State +	4	–	2	–	0	11	–	6	–	3
No. 18 Penn State +	2	–	3	–	1	14	–	8	–	1
Northwestern	2	–	3	–	1	8	–	8	–	2
No. 15 Michigan State +	2	–	4	–	0	13	–	7	–	2
Wisconsin	1	–	4	–	1	4	–	13	–	3
‡ – 2010 B1G Tournament champion + – Invited to the 2010 NCAA tournament; As of August 26, 2010; Rankings from NSCAA

The 2010 Michigan Wolverines men's soccer team represented the University of Michigan during the 2010 NCAA Division I men's soccer season. It was the 11th season the university fielded a men's varsity soccer team, and their 11th season in the Big Ten Conference. The team was coached by 11th year head coach Steve Burns. The Wolverines finished the season 17–5–3, setting a program record for wins.

The Wolverines won the 2010 Big Ten Men's Soccer Tournament for the first time in program history. The season was highlighted by the team advancing to the College Cup for the first time in program history, where they lost to eventual tournament champion Akron 1–2.

== Squad information ==
=== Coaching staff ===
Position	Name
Head coach	Steve Burns
Assistant coach	Paul Snape
Assistant coach	Chris Grassie
Volunteer Assistant Coach	Adam Bruh
Operations Assistant	Waldir DeSouza

== Schedule ==
Date Time, TV	Rank^{#}	Opponent^{#}	Result	Record	Site (Attendance) City, State
Regular season
September 1*; 7:30 p.m.		Detroit	W 2–1 ^{OT}	1–0–0	U-M Soccer Stadium (1,442); Ann Arbor, MI
September 3*; 7:30 p.m.		No. 14 Drake	L 0–1	1–1–0	U-M Soccer Stadium (1,884); Ann Arbor, MI
September 10*; 1:00 p.m.		vs. UIC	W 2–0	2–1–0	Championship Field; Seattle, WA
September 12*; 1:30 p.m.		vs. Seattle	T 2–2 ^{2OT}	2–1–1	Championship Field (619); Seattle, WA
September 15*; 7:30 p.m.		Oakland	W 2–1	3–1–1	U-M Soccer Stadium (775); Ann Arbor, MI
September 17*; 7:30 p.m.		Notre Dame	T 0–0 ^{2OT}	3–1–2	U-M Soccer Stadium (3,503); Ann Arbor, MI
September 19*; 1:00 p.m.		at Marquette	T 1–1 ^{2OT}	3–1–3	Valley Fields (200); Milwaukee, WI
September 22*; 7:00 p.m.		Kentucky	W 3–2 ^{OT}	4–1–3	U-M Soccer Stadium (494); Ann Arbor, MI
September 25; 7:00 p.m.		No. 23 Ohio State	L 0–1	4–2–3 (0–1–0)	U-M Soccer Stadium (3,207); Ann Arbor, MI
October 3; 1:00 p.m.		No. 24 Penn State	W 2–1	5–2–3 (1–1–0)	U-M Soccer Stadium (1,191); Ann Arbor, MI
October 6*; 7:00 p.m.		Cincinnati	W 2–0	6–2–3	U-M Soccer Stadium (548); Ann Arbor, MI
October 10; 3:00 p.m.		at Wisconsin	W 3–2	7–2–3 (2–1–0)	Dan McClimon Complex (1,593); Madison, WI
October 13*; 7:00 p.m.		Valparaiso	W 4–2	8–2–3	U-M Soccer Stadium (501); Ann Arbor, MI
October 16; 7:00 p.m.		at No. 18 Indiana	L 1–2	8–3–3 (2–2–0)	Bill Armstrong Stadium (2,204); Bloomington, IN
October 19*; 7:30 p.m.		at No. 1 Akron	L 1–7	8–4–3	FirstEnergy Stadium–Cub Cadet Field (3,018); Akron, OH
October 27*; 7:00 p.m.		Bowling Green	W 2–0	9–4–3	U-M Soccer Stadium (632); Ann Arbor, MI
October 30; 1:00 p.m.		No. 25 Michigan State; Rivalry	W 3–2 ^{OT}	10–4–3 (3–2–0)	U-M Soccer Stadium (2,615); Ann Arbor, MI
November 6; 5:00 p.m.		at Northwestern	W 4–2	11–4–3 (4–2–0)	Lakeside Field (432); Evanston, IL
Big Ten Tournament
November 11; 12:00 p.m.	(3)	vs. (6) Michigan State; Quarterfinal	W 2–1	12–4–3	Jeffrey Field; State College, PA
November 12; 1:00 p.m.	(3)	vs. (7) Wisconsin; Semifinal	W 1–0	13–4–3	Jeffrey Field (2,246); State College, PA
November 14; 12:00 p.m.	(3)	vs. (4) Penn State; Championship Game	W 4–1	14–4–3	Jeffrey Field (1,836); State College, PA
NCAA Tournament
November 21; 2:00 p.m.	(10) No. 19	Central Florida; Second Round	W 1–1 ^{OT}	15–4–3	U-M Soccer Stadium (2,742); Ann Arbor, MI
November 28; 2:00 p.m.	(10) No. 19	at (7) No. 18 South Carolina; Regional semifinals	W 3–1	16–4–3	Stone Stadium (2,256); Columbia, SC
December 4; 1:00 p.m.	(10) No. 19	at (2) No. 3 Maryland; Regional finals	W 3–2 ^{OT}	17–4–3	Ludwig Field (3,536); College Park, MD
December 10; 8:00 p.m.	(10) No. 19	vs. (3) No. 2 Akron; College Cup	L 1–2	17–5–3	Harder Stadium (7,560); Santa Barbara, CA
*Non-conference game. ^{#}Rankings from United Soccer Coaches. (#) Tournament seedings in parentheses.

== Rankings ==
Ranking movements Legend: ██ Increase in ranking ██ Decrease in ranking — = Not ranked RV = Received votes
	Week												
Poll	Pre	1	2	3	4	5	6	7	8	9	10	11	Final
NSCAA	—	—	—	—	—	RV	RV	RV	—	—	RV	19	4

== 2011 MLS SuperDraft ==
Player	Round	Pick	Position	MLS club	Ref.
Justin Meram	1	15	F	Columbus Crew SC	
