= Steve Burns (soccer) =

American soccer coach

Biographical details
- Education: Michigan

Coaching career (HC unless noted)
- 1996–1999: Michigan Bucks
- 2000–2011: Michigan

Head coaching record
- Overall: 122–98–22 (.550)
- Tournaments: NCAA: 7–4 (.636)

Steve Burns is a former American soccer coach. He served as the inaugural head coach of the Michigan Bucks and Michigan Wolverines men's soccer team.

== Playing career ==
Burns played professionally for the Detroit Wheels of the United States Interregional Soccer League (USISL) from 1994 to 1995. He captained the squad in 1995.

== Coaching career ==
=== Michigan Bucks ===
Burns served as the inaugural head coach of the Michigan Bucks of the Premier Development League from 1996 to 1999. During his tenure as head coach he led the Bucks to a 69–28–0 record, and four consecutive divisional titles. He helped lead them to national finalist finishes in 1996 and 1997 and advanced to the round of 16 in the 1999 U.S. Open Cup.

=== University of Michigan ===
Burns was the Michigan club team's head coach from 1993 until the program earned varsity status in 2000. He helped lead the club to six consecutive appearances in the national club championship tournament, and won back-to-back national club titles in 1997 and 1998. On September 28, 1999, he was named the inaugural head coach for Michigan Wolverines men's soccer team. His most successful season was in 2010 when he led the team to a 17–5–3 record, and their first Big Ten Tournament championship in program history. The team also advanced to the College Cup where they lost to eventual tournament champion Akron in the national semifinals.

He served as head coach for the Wolverines until he resigned on November 30, 2011. During his tenure as head coach he led the Wolverines to a 122–98–22 overall record. He helped Michigan produce 11 All-Big Ten first team honors, and 10 second-team all-conference honors, while three Wolverines earned NSCAA All-America honors during his tenure.

== Head coaching record ==
Record table
Season	Team	Overall	Conference	Standing	Postseason
Michigan Wolverines (Big Ten Conference) (2000–2011)
2000	Michigan	6–10–0	1–5–0	6th	
2001	Michigan	10–7–1	3–3–0	5th	
2002	Michigan	11–7–2	3–3–0	2nd	
2003	Michigan	14–7–1	5–1–0	2nd	NCAA 3rd Round
2004	Michigan	11–8–4	1–4–1	7th	NCAA 2nd Round
2005	Michigan	8–10–1	2–4–0	5th	
2006	Michigan	7–10–4	1–2–3	5th	
2007	Michigan	10–7–2	0–4–2	7th	
2008	Michigan	13–6–3	4–1–1	2nd	NCAA 3rd Round
2009	Michigan	10–7–1	2–4–0	6th	
2010	Michigan	17–5–3	4–2–0	2nd	NCAA Semifinal
2011	Michigan	5–14–1	1–5–0	6th	
Michigan:		122–98–22 (.550)	27–38–7 (.424)		
Total:		122–98–22 (.550)			
National champion Postseason invitational champion Conference regular season champion Conference regular season and conference tournament champion Division regular season champion Division regular season and conference tournament champion Conference tournament champion
