= Michigan–Michigan State men's soccer rivalry =

College sports rivalry

Michigan-Michigan State soccer rivalry
- Michigan Wolverines Michigan State Spartans
- Sport: Soccer
- First meeting: October 13, 1956; Michigan State 3, Michigan Club 1
- Latest meeting: October 13, 2026; Michigan State 1, Michigan 1
- Next meeting: 2027
- Trophy: Big Bear Trophy

Statistics
- Total meetings: 58
- All-time series: Michigan State leads, 34–13–11 (Total) Michigan State leads, 16–12–6 (Varsity)
- Trophy series: Michigan State leads, 14–6–6
- Largest victory: Michigan State, 5–0 (2007)
- Longest win streak: Michigan, 5 (2019–2021)
- Longest unbeaten streak: Tied: Michigan State, 7 (2004–2009) and Michigan, 7 (2018–2022)
- Current unbeaten streak: Michigan State, 2 (2022–present)

The Michigan–Michigan State soccer rivalry is an American college soccer rivalry between the University of Michigan Wolverines and Michigan State University Spartans.

== History ==
The winner of each year's game receives the Big Bear Trophy. The first game was played October 13, 1956, which saw the Spartans defeat the Wolverine club team 3-1 in East Lansing. The Spartans played Michigan's club team 24 times between 1956 and 1991, amassing a 18–1–5 record. In 2000, Michigan added soccer as a Varsity sport and on October 15, 2000, the rivalry between the varsity club officially began with the Spartans winning 2–1 in double overtime in East Lansing. The trophy originated in 2000 when Michigan head coach Steve Burns purchased the wooden-bear sculpture to commemorate the revival of the rivalry. Burns said that he and Michigan State head coach Joe Baum collaborated on a trophy game because they "wanted to have some kind of trophy for this rivalry that the teams can pass back and forth. We hope that it takes a life on its own." In the spring of 2021, the restructured Big Ten soccer season saw the two teams matched up twice in the regular season for the first time, however neither game would contest the Big Bear trophy. If the Big bear game ends in a tie the trophy stays with the team that has it last.

== Game results ==
See footnotes

Michigan State leads the varsity series, 16–12–6. The Big Bear trophy series is solely a result of the regular season meeting, excluding NCAA and Big Ten postseason games. In the trophy series, Michigan State leads, 14–6–6 through the 2025 season.

Michigan victories	Michigan State victories	Tie games

No.	Date	Location	Winner	Score
1	October 15, 2000	East Lansing, MI	Michigan State	2–1^{2OT}
2	October 14, 2001	East Lansing, MI	Michigan State	4–2
3	October 13, 2002	Ann Arbor, MI	Michigan State	2–1
4	November 15, 2002	Bloomington, IN	Michigan	1–0
5	October 12, 2003	East Lansing, MI	Michigan	4–2
6	October 17, 2004	Ann Arbor, MI	Michigan State	3–2^{OT}
7	October 16, 2005	East Lansing, MI	Michigan State	2–0
8	November 10, 2005	Evanston, IL	Michigan State	1–0
9	October 8, 2006	Ann Arbor, MI	Tie	1–1
10	October 14, 2007	East Lansing, MI	Michigan State	5–0
11	October 18, 2008	Ann Arbor, MI	Michigan State	1–0
12	October 25, 2009	East Lansing, MI	Michigan State	2–1
13	October 30, 2010	Ann Arbor, MI	Michigan	3–2^{OT}
14	November 11, 2010	Ann Arbor, MI	Michigan	2–1
15	October 30, 2011	East Lansing, MI	Michigan State	1–0
16	November 3, 2012	Ann Arbor, MI	Michigan	1–0
17	November 11, 2012	Evanston, IL	Michigan State	2–1^{OT}
18	November 9, 2013	East Lansing, MI	No. 18 Michigan State	2–0

No.	Date	Location	Winner	Score
19	November 2, 2014	East Lansing, MI	Michigan	3–2
20	October 31, 2015	Ann Arbor, MI	Michigan	1–0
21	September 18, 2016	East Lansing, MI	Michigan State	1–0
22	September 17, 2017	Ann Arbor, MI	No. 6 Michigan State	1–0^{OT}
23	October 23, 2018	East Lansing, MI	Tie	1–1
24	October 29, 2019	Ann Arbor, MI	Michigan	2–0
25	November 10, 2019	Ann Arbor, MI	Michigan	2–1
26	February 23, 2021	Brighton, MI	Michigan	1–0
27	March 23, 2021	East Lansing, MI	No. 11 Michigan	2–1^{OT}
28	April 10, 2021	Ann Arbor, MI	No. 20 Michigan	1–0
29	October 5, 2021	Ann Arbor, MI	Tie	2–2
30	September 27, 2022	East Lansing, MI	Michigan State	2–0
31	October 10, 2023	Ann Arbor, MI	Tie	0–0
32	October 22, 2024	East Lansing, MI	Tie	0–0
33	September 26, 2025	Ann Arbor, MI	Michigan State	2–1
34	October 13, 2026	East Lansing, MI	Tie	1–1
35	TBD 2027	Ann Arbor, MI		
Series: Michigan State leads 16–12–6

== See also ==
- Michigan–Michigan State football rivalry
- Michigan–Michigan State men's basketball rivalry
- Michigan–Michigan State men's ice hockey rivalry
- Michigan–Michigan State women's basketball rivalry
