= Big Ten men's soccer tournament =

- Conference soccer championship
- Sport: College soccer
- Conference: Big Ten Conference
- Number of teams: 6
- Format: Single-elimination tournament
- Current stadium: Ludwig Field
- Current location: College Park, Maryland
- Played: 1991–present
- Last contest: 2026
- Current champion: Indiana (17th title)
- Most championships: Indiana (17)
- Official website: bigten.org/msoc

The Big Ten men's soccer tournament is the conference championship tournament in soccer for the Big Ten Conference. The tournament has been held every year since 1991. It is a single-elimination tournament and seeding is based on regular season records. The winner, declared conference champion, receives the conference's automatic bid to the NCAA Division I men's soccer championship.

Indiana is the most winning team with 17 championships to date.

== Champions ==
The following is a list of Big Ten Tournament winners:

=== Finals ===
Key

- (1) – Title number
- a.e.t. – Match went to extra time
- p – Match decided by a penalty shoot-out after extra time
- – Winning team won regular season
- – Winning team won National championship
- – Winning team won regular season, tournament, and National championship

Ed.	Year	Champion	Score	Runner-up	Venue	City
1	1991	Indiana (1)	2–0	Wisconsin	Bill Armstrong Stadium	Bloomington, IN
2	1992	Indiana (2)	2–1	Penn State	Bill Armstrong Stadium	Bloomington, IN
3	1993	Penn State (1)	1–0	Wisconsin	McClimon Stadium	Madison, WI
4	1994	Indiana (3)	3–1	Penn State	Jesse Owens Stadium	Columbus, OH
5	1995	Indiana (4) (Note: Title shared.)	– (Note: The 1995 championship game was cancelled. Indiana and Wisconsin were declared co-champions.)	(none)	DeMartin Complex	East Lansing, MI
5	1995	Wisconsin (1)	–	(none)	DeMartin Complex	East Lansing, MI
6	1996	Indiana (5)	4–0	Michigan State	Jeffrey Field	University Park, PA
7	1997	Indiana (6)	1–0	Ohio State	Bill Armstrong Stadium	Bloomington, IN
8	1998	Indiana (7)	1–0 (a.e.t.)	Penn State	Lakeside Field	Evanston, IL
9	1999	Indiana (8)	2–1 (a.e.t.)	Penn State	DeMartin Complex	East Lansing, MI
10	2000	Ohio State	3–2 (a.e.t.)	Penn State	Jesse Owens Stadium	Columbus, OH
11	2001	Indiana (9)	2–0	Michigan State	McClimon Stadium	Madison, WI
12	2002	Penn State (2)	2–1	Michigan	Jeffrey Field	University Park, PA
13	2003	Indiana (10)	1–1 (4–1 p)	Penn State	Bill Armstrong Stadium	Bloomington, IN
14	2004	Michigan State (1)	1–0	Northwestern	U-M Soccer Stadium	Ann Arbor, MI
15	2005	Penn State (3)	1–0	Indiana	Lakeside Field	Evanston, IL
16	2006	Indiana (11)	1–0	Ohio State	Jesse Owens Stadium	Columbus, OH
17	2007	Ohio State (2)	0–0 (5–4 p)	Indiana	DeMartin Complex	East Lansing, MI
18	2008	Michigan State (2)	1–0	Indiana	McClimon Stadium	Madison, WI
19	2009	Ohio State (3)	1–0	Penn State	Bill Armstrong Stadium	Bloomington, IN
20	2010	Michigan	4–1	Penn State	Jeffrey Field	University Park, PA
21	2011	Northwestern (1)	2–1	Penn State	U-M Soccer Stadium	Ann Arbor, MI
22	2012	Michigan State (3)	2–1 (a.e.t.)	Michigan	Lakeside Field	Evanston, IL
23	2013	Indiana (12)	1–0	Michigan State	Crew Stadium	Columbus, OH
24	2014	Maryland (1)	2–1	Indiana	Ludwig Field	College Park, MD
25	2015	Maryland (2)	2–0	Ohio State	Jesse Owens Stadium	Columbus, OH
26	2016	Maryland (3)	3–1	Wisconsin	Grand Park	Westfield, IN
27	2017	Wisconsin (2)	0–0 (4–2 p)	Indiana	Grand Park	Westfield, IN
28	2018	Indiana (13)	3–0	Michigan	Grand Park	Westfield, IN
29	2019	Indiana (14)	0–0 (4–3 p)	Michigan	Ludwig Field	College Park, MD
30	2020	Indiana (15)	1–1 (3–2 p)	Penn State	Bill Armstrong Stadium	Bloomington, IN
31	2021	Penn State (4)	3–0	Indiana	Jeffrey Field	University Park, PA
32	2022	Rutgers (1)	3–1	Indiana	Yurcak Field	Piscataway, NJ
33	2023	Indiana (16)	1–0	Penn State	Bill Armstrong Stadium	Bloomington, IN
34	2024	Ohio State (4)	1–0	Michigan	SeatGeek Stadium	Bridgeview, IL
35	2025	UCLA	5–0	Michigan	Ludwig Field	College Park, MD
36	2026	Indiana	2–2 (3–2 p)	Washington	Bill Armstrong Stadium	Bloomington, IN

== Performance by school ==
=== Most championships ===
School	Titles	Winning years
Indiana	17	1991, 1992, 1994, 1995, 1996, 1997, 1998, 1999, 2001, 2003, 2006, 2013, 2018, 2019, 2020, 2023, 2026
Penn State	4	1993, 2002, 2005, 2021
Ohio State	4	2000, 2007, 2009, 2024
Maryland	3	2014, 2015, 2016
Michigan State	3	2004, 2008, 2012
Wisconsin	2	1995, 2017
Michigan	1	2010
Northwestern	1	2011
Rutgers	1	2022
UCLA	1	2025

=== Records all-time by team ===
through 2026 Tournament

School	GP	W	L	T	Pct.	Titles	Runn.
Indiana	74	48	14	12	.730	17	7
Penn State	68	36	25	7	.581	4	11
Maryland	23	12	8	3	.587	3	0
Michigan State	49	19	26	4	.429	3	3
Ohio State	52	24	25	3	.490	4	3
Michigan	46	21	23	3	.479	1	6
Northwestern	39	10	27	2	.282	1	1
Rutgers	17	5	9	3	.382	1	0
Wisconsin	45	12	27	6	.333	2	3
Washington	5	0	2	3	.300	0	1
UCLA	4	3	1	1	.700	1	0
