= Skeeles Field =

University baseball venue in Akron, Ohio

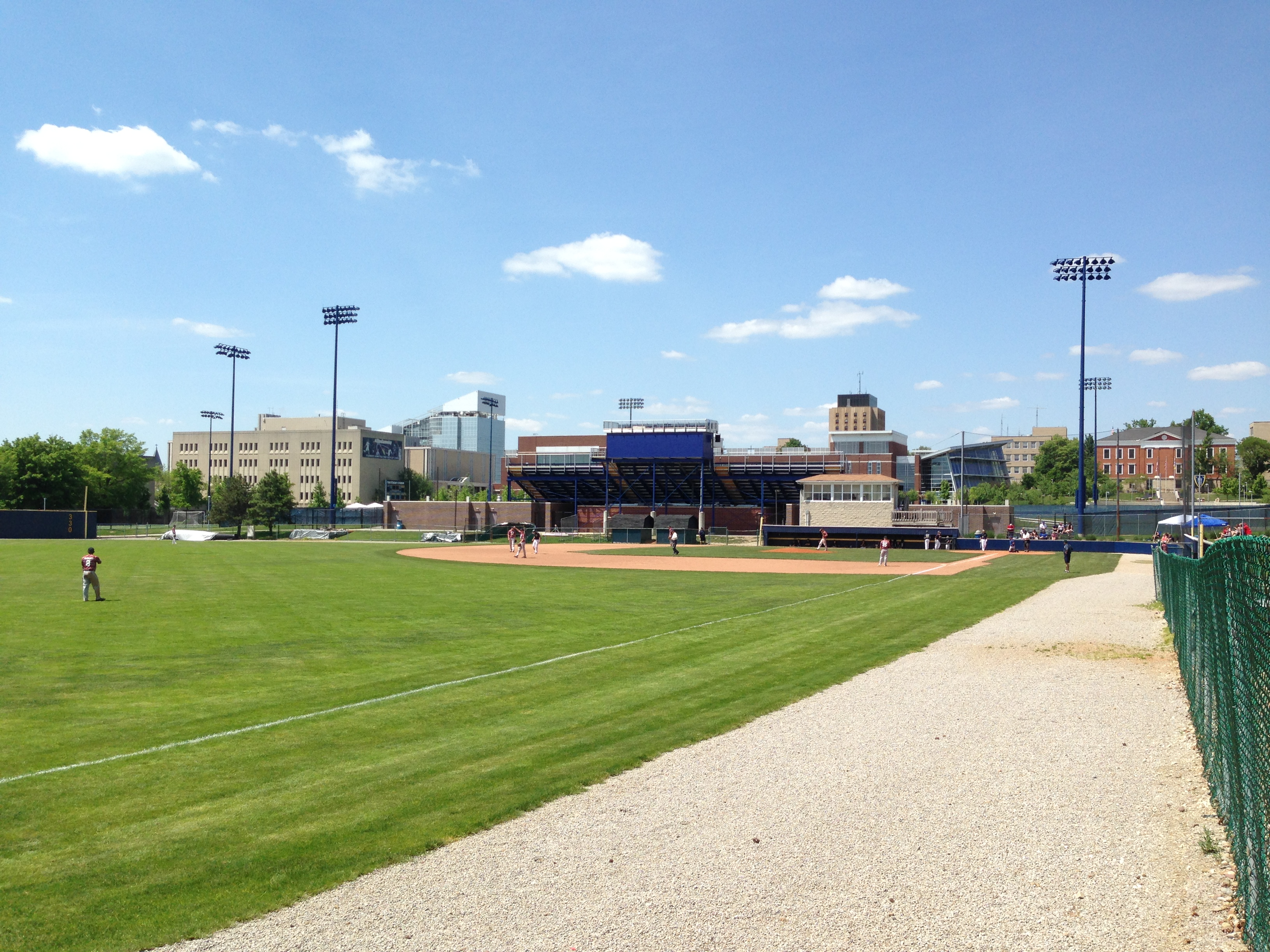
- Interactive map of Skeeles Field
- Former names: Lee R. Jackson Field
- Location: East Exchange Street and South Union Street, Akron, Ohio, United States
- Coordinates: 41.073635°N 81.511374°W
- Owner: University of Akron
- Operator: University of Akron
- Capacity: 300
- Surface: Sprinturf Ultra-blade
- Scoreboard: Electronic
- Field size: 320 ft. (LF); 390 ft. (CF); 305 ft. (RF); 10 ft. (outfield fence)
- Acreage: 23

Construction
- Built: 1967
- Opened: April 8, 1967
- Renovated: 1972, 2002, 2019

Tenant
- Akron Zips (NCAA) 1967–2015, 2020–present

Skeeles Field, formerly known as Lee R. Jackson Baseball Field, is a baseball venue on the campus of the University of Akron in Akron, Ohio, United States. It is the home field of the Akron Zips baseball team and part of the 23-acre (9.3 ha) Lee R. Jackson Athletic Complex which also includes the varsity softball field, track and field complex, a football practice field, and FirstEnergy Stadium–Cub Cadet Field. The facility was built in 1967, moved to its current site in 1972, and has a listed seating capacity of 300 spectators.

The venue is named for Bill and Mary Skeeles, with Bill being a 1977 Akron alumnus and former Zips baseball player. The Skeeles donated $1 million in 2019 towards a $2 million, two-phase project to upgrade the facility as part of the return of the Zips baseball program in 2020 after the program was eliminated in 2015. The complex is named for Lee R. Jackson, former chairman of the university's board of directors. The baseball field was also named for Jackson until 2020.

== History ==
The field was constructed in 1967 and hosted its first game on April 8, 1967, in which Akron defeated Kenyon 15–8. In 1972, it was moved to its current location next to Akron's soccer facility.

Prior to the 2002 season, a $45,000 project installed a new backstop at the facility. Later, new bullpens were added.

After the 2015 season, the University of Akron announced that the baseball team was eliminated as part of several budget cuts. Several baseball alumni and supporters organized and were able to get the sport reinstated for the 2020 season. As part of the rebuilding process, a two-phase, $2 million renovation project was planned for Lee R. Jackson Baseball Field. Phase one included installation of a new artificial playing surface, Sprinturf Ultra-blade, and a new scoreboard. The field was completed in time for the season and home opener in February, while the scoreboard was installed in March. Phase two calls for construction of new bleacher seating and a new press box. In honor of the $1 million contribution from 1977 Zips baseball alum Bill Skeeles and his wife Mary, the field was renamed Skeeles Field. The new field debuted February 16, 2020, a 4–3, 14-inning Akron loss to the Oakland Golden Grizzlies.

== Other uses ==
In addition to Akron baseball, the field has hosted high school baseball prospect camps.
