= Chad Severs =

American soccer player (born 1982)

Personal information
- Full name: Chad Severs
- Date of birth: August 13, 1982 (age 44)
- Place of birth: Vineland, New Jersey, United States
- Height: 5 ft 10 in (1.78 m)
- Position: Forward

College career
Years	Team	Apps	(Gls)
2001–2004	Penn State Nittany Lions		

Senior career*
Years	Team	Apps	(Gls)
2003	Jersey Shore Boca		
2004	Reading Rage	12	(5)
2005	Harrisburg City Islanders	20	(14)
2006–2007	Rochester Rhinos	16	(3)
2006	→ Wilmington Hammerheads (loan)	1	(0)
2006	→ Harrisburg City Islanders (loan)	5	(4)
2007	→ Harrisburg City Islanders (loan)	7	(4)
2007–2008	Otago United	11	(1)
2008	Rochester Rhinos	11	(0)
2009	Harrisburg City Islanders	19	(9)
2010–2011	Pittsburgh Riverhounds	42	(7)
- * Club domestic league appearances and goals as of June 4, 2011

Chad Severs (born August 13, 1982, in Vineland, New Jersey) is an American former professional soccer player.

== Career ==
=== College and amateur ===
Severs attended Ocean City High School in Ocean City, New Jersey where he is currently the second all-time leading scorer in New Jersey prep history. His 159 career goals are just two shy of Tab Ramos' record of 161. Severs once scored 8 goals in a high school game, a South Jersey record. In 1999–2000, during his junior and senior seasons, at Ocean City High School, he helped capture two New Jersey Group III state co-championships. During his youth, he played his club soccer for the seven-time New Jersey State Cup Champions, Mercer United Warriors. In 2000, he would end his youth career with the newly founded Match Fit Academy. He was also a regular on the Region 1 Olympic Development Team and is a 2000 Adidas Elite Soccer Program Alumni.

Severs accepted a full athletic scholarship and played his college soccer at Penn State University from 2001 to 2004. While with Penn State, he led the team in scoring for three straight years, from 2002 to 2004. He finished his Nittany Lion career ninth in all-time career goals (38) and points (90). This achievement also places him sixth in the Big Ten Conference record books. In 2001, he earned Co-Big Ten Freshman of the Year honors and was named Penn State Freshman Male Student Athlete of the Year. He was selected to Second-Team All-Big Ten and College Soccer News National All-Freshman Second Team. During that same year, the Nittany Lions would make it to the NCAA Tournament "Sweet Sixteen". In 2002, Severs had a breakout year scoring 17 goals while he led the Nittany Lions to a Big Ten Tournament Championship and onto the NCAA Tournament "Elite 8". For his efforts in his sophomore campaign, he garnered First-Team All-Big Ten honors and Honorable Mention on the College Soccer News All-American Team. In 2003, Severs totaled 7 goals and added 3 assists. In the same year, Penn State would fall one game short of capturing their second straight Big Ten Tournament Championship and losing out on the NCAA tournament for the first time in Severs' career. They lost in the Big Ten Championship game to Indiana University in penalty kicks. Although, a mediocre year by the Nittany Lion squad, Severs would get attention on the Middle-Atlantic All-Region Second-Team.

Prior to his senior season, he was a College Soccer News Third-Team Preseason All-American. He went on to lead the Nittany Lions in goals (9) and points (21) for the third straight year and received Second-Team All-Big Ten. Penn State would eventually lose in the NCAA tournament "round of 32". Shortly after his final year at Penn State, he was one of 66 seniors invited to participate in the 2005 Adidas Major League Soccer Combine at the Home Depot Center in Carson, Ca. In 2004, he was also named the South Jersey Soccer Coaches Association College Player of the Year. In an effort to make his dream become a reality much quicker and concentrate fully on playing professional soccer, Severs would graduate in just 3 and 1/2 years, with a B.S. in Kinesiology.

During his college years Severs also played in the USL Premier Development League with Jersey Shore Boca and the Reading Rage.

=== Professional ===
Severs turned professional in 2005 when he with the Harrisburg City Islanders of the USL Second Division and was named USL2 Rookie of the Year. Severs moved on to the Rochester Rhinos for 2006, but the Islanders brought him back for a five-game loan stint over which he scored four goals. He was more of a presence for Rochester in 2007, scoring 3 goals and 7 points over 14 appearances, but still found time for another productive loan spell in Harrisburg (3 goals, 8 points in five games) as he helped the Islanders on their championship run. In 2007, he also appeared in 11 games with Otago United of the New Zealand Football Championship.

He transferred back the Islanders in 2009, and enjoyed the most productive season of his career, scoring 9 goals in 19 games for the team.

Despite playing only 51 games in a Harrisburg uniform, Severs ranks as the club's all-time leader in goals (31), points (70), and game-winning goals (6). On February 11, 2010 Pittsburgh Riverhounds announced the signing of Severs to a contract for the 2010 season.

== Personal ==
In his spare time, Severs enjoys traveling, bodyboarding, and playing golf in his hometown of Ocean City, New Jersey.
