= 2010 NCAA Division I men's soccer tournament =

Men's College Cup (semifinals & final)

Tournament details
- Country: United States
- Teams: 48

Final positions
- Champions: Akron Zips
- Runners-up: Louisville Cardinals
- Semifinalists: Michigan Wolverines; North Carolina Tar Heels

Tournament statistics
- Matches played: 47
- Goals scored: 150 (3.19 per match)
- Top goal scorer: Justin Meram (5)

The 2010 NCAA Division I men's soccer tournament was a tournament of 48 collegiate soccer teams who played for the NCAA Championship in soccer. The semifinals and final were held at Harder Stadium in Santa Barbara, California. All the other games were played at the home field of the higher seeded team (indicated by * for non-seeded teams). The final was held on December 12, 2010. Akron defeated Louisville, 1–0, for the title.

The bracket was announced November 15, 2010. The tournament started on November 18. The second round was played on November 21. The third round was played on November 28. The Regional Finals were played December 3 and 4.

== Qualified teams ==
=== Automatic bids ===
All automatic bids are granted for winning a conference championship tournament, except for the automatic bid of the Ivy League, Pacific-10 Conference, and West Coast Conference, each given to the regular season champion. There were 22 automatic bids to the NCAA tournament.

Team	Conference	Record
UMBC	America East Conference	(11–4–3)
Maryland	Atlantic Coast Conference	(17–2–1)
East Tennessee State	Atlantic Sun Conference	(15–5–0)
Xavier	Atlantic 10 Conference	(10–6–4)
Louisville	Big East Conference	(16–0–3)
Coastal Carolina	Big South Conference	(12–7–2)
Michigan	Big Ten Conference	(14–4–3)
UC Santa Barbara	Big West Conference	(13–4–3)
William & Mary	Colonial Athletic Association	(15–3–2)
South Carolina	Conference USA	(12–6–2)
Butler	Horizon League	(16–0–3)
Princeton	Ivy League	(13–3–1)
St. Peter's	Metro Atlantic Athletic Conference	(13–5–1)
Akron	Mid-American Conference	(18–1–1)
Bradley	Missouri Valley Conference	(11–8–3)
Sacramento State	Mountain Pacific Sports Federation	(10–4–7)
Monmouth	Northeast Conference	(14–1–4)
California	Pacific-10 Conference	(12–2–3)
Bucknell	Patriot League	(10–8–2)
UNC Greensboro	Southern Conference	(12–5–4)
Oakland	Summit League	(7–10–3)
Santa Clara	West Coast Conference	(10–5–5)

=== At-large bids ===
26 teams received at-large bids to the tournament.

- ACC - Boston College (10–4–5)
- ACC - Duke (9–5–4)
- ACC - North Carolina (16–3–1)
- ACC - Virginia (11–5–3)
- Big East - Connecticut (12–2–5)
- Big East - Georgetown (11–6–1)
- Big East - Notre Dame (10–5–4)
- Big East - Providence (12–5–3)
- Big East - South Florida (9–5–4)
- Big East - West Virginia (10–7–2)
- Big Ten - Indiana (9–7–2)
- Big Ten - Michigan State (11–7–1)
- Big Ten - Penn State (13–7–1)
- Big Ten - Ohio State (10–5–3)
- CAA - Old Dominion (9–6–2)
- Conference USA - Central Florida (11–4–3)
- Conference USA - SMU (15–2–0)
- Conference USA - Tulsa (11–6–2)
- Ivy League - Brown (11–3–3)
- Ivy League - Dartmouth (10–6–1)
- Ivy League - Penn (12–5–0)
- Missouri Valley - Creighton (12–5–1)
- Mountain Pacific - Denver (9–6–4)
- Mountain Pacific - New Mexico (9–5–5)
- Pacific-10 - UCLA (14–4–1)
- Southern - College of Charleston (10–4–3)

== Regional 1 ==
First round
ETSU	2
College of Charleston*	3
St. Peter's	2
Providence*	6
Dartmouth	4
Monmouth*	0
Santa Clara	1
Sacramento St.*	2

Second round
College of Charleston	1
1	Louisville	3
16	Ohio St.	2
Providence	1
Dartmouth	2/OT
9	Notre Dame	1
8	UCLA	4
Sacramento St.	1

Regional semifinals
1	Louisville	2
16	Ohio St.	1
Dartmouth	1
8	UCLA	2/2OT

Regional Finals
1	Louisville	5
8	UCLA	4

== Regional 2 ==
First round
New Mexico	1
Creighton*	4
UMBC	2
Princeton*	1
Oakland	0
Michigan St.*	2
UNC Greensboro	0
Georgetown*	3

Second round
Creighton	2(3)
5	SMU	2(5)
12	William & Mary	0(4)
UMBC	0(3)
Michigan St.	1
13	Butler	0
4	North Carolina	0(5)
Georgetown	0(4)

Regional semifinals
5	SMU	1
12	William & Mary	0
Michigan St.	1(4)
4	North Carolina	1(5)

Regional Finals
5	SMU	1(2)
4	North Carolina	1(4)

== Regional 3 ==
First round
Xavier	2
West Virginia*	4
Bradley	0
Tulsa*	2
Boston College	1
Brown*	2
Denver	0
UC Santa Barbara*	1/2OT

Second round
West Virginia	2
3	Akron	3
14	Indiana	5
Tulsa	1
Brown	1(7)
11	Connecticut	1(6)
6	California	2/OT
UC Santa Barbara	1

Regional semifinals
3	Akron	2
14	Indiana	1
Brown	0
6	California	2

Regional Finals
3	Akron	3(3)
6	California	3(2)

== Regional 4 ==
First round
Coastal Carolina	1
Duke*	2
South Florida	0
Central Florida*	3
Old Dominion	1
Virginia*	0
Bucknell	0
Penn*	1/OT

Second round
Duke	0
7	South Carolina	1/OT
10	Michigan	2/OT
Central Florida	1
Old Dominion	1
15	Penn St.	4
2	Maryland	4
Penn	0

Regional semifinals
7	South Carolina	1
10	Michigan	3
15	Penn St.	0
2	Maryland	1

Regional Finals
10	Michigan	3/2OT
2	Maryland	2

== College Cup ==
Harder Stadium, Santa Barbara, California

National semifinals December 10
1	Louisville	2
4	North Carolina	1
3	Akron	2
10	Michigan	1

National Championship; December 12
1	Louisville	0
3	Akron	1

== Schedule ==
Host team, or higher seed, is listed on the right. Away team or lower seed is listed on the left.

=== First Round ===
November 18, 2010	Georgetown	3–0	UNC Greensboro	Washington D.C.
	Christianson 9'; Riemer 21'; Diggs 83'	Report		Stadium: Shaw Field; Attendance: 385; Referee: Bill Dittmar

November 18, 2010	Monmouth	0–4	Dartmouth	West Long Branch, New Jersey
		Report	Olson 9'; Pappas 53'; Mkosana 66'; Gaide 80'	Stadium: Hesse Field; Attendance: 1,470; Referee: Gus St. Silva

November 18, 2010	Providence	6–2	St. Peter's	Providence, Rhode Island
	Marcin 19', 73'; Arboleda 26', 54'; McClure 37'; Grisell 75'	Report	Pila 62'; Olson 80'	Stadium: Glay Field; Attendance: 1,208; Referee: Sean Nally

November 18, 2010	UCF	3–0	USF	Orlando, Florida
	Hunt 35'; Keown-Robson 45'; Bacher 65'	Report		Stadium: UCF Soccer and Track Stadium; Attendance: 529; Referee: Shane Moody

November 18, 2010	Brown	2–1	Boston College	Providence, Rhode Island
	Okafor 11'; Mandel 43'	Report	Bekker 41' (yellow card) 87' (yellow-red card) 90'	Stadium: Stevenson Field; Attendance: 1,000; Referee: Erich Simmons

November 18, 2010	Duke	2–1	Coastal Carolina	Durham, North Carolina
	Grossman 77', 83'	Report	Kelly 23'	Stadium: Koskinen Stadium; Attendance: 1,006; Referee: Alex Prus

November 18, 2010	Virginia	0–1	Old Dominion	Charlottesville, Virginia
		Report	Vaughan 63'	Stadium: Klöckner Stadium; Attendance: 923; Referee: Christopher Spivey

November 18, 2010	College of Charleston	3–2	East Tennessee State	Mount Pleasant, South Carolina
	Ferguson 24'; Craven 29'; Twohig 39'	Report	Shoenfeld 57'; Westbrook 71'	Stadium: Patriots Point Soccer Complex; Attendance: 2,024; Referee: Danny Provenzano

November 18, 2010	Creighton	4–1	New Mexico	Omaha, Nebraska
	Gomez 4'; Finlay 31', 90'; Polak 37'	Report	Sandoval 71'	Stadium: Morrison Stadium; Attendance: 1,074; Referee: Troy Cohrs

November 18, 2010	UC Santa Barbara	1–0 2OT	Denver	Santa Barbara, California
	Ibrahim 105'	Report		Stadium: Harder Stadium; Attendance: 3,717; Referee: Mohammed Ibrahim

November 18, 2010	Tulsa	2–0	Bradley	Tulsa, Oklahoma
	Cumings 17'; McInnes 78'	Report		Stadium: Hurricane Soccer & Track Stadium; Attendance: 297; Referee: Tim Debysingh

November 18, 2010	Princeton	1–2	UMBC	Princeton, New Jersey
	Hoppenot 32'	Report	Houapeu 42'; Bulls 79'	Stadium: Roberts Stadium; Attendance: 959; Referee: Ed Shea

November 18, 2010	Sacramento State	2–1	Santa Clara	Sacramento, California
		Report		Stadium: Hornet Field; Attendance: 788

November 18, 2010	Oakland	0–2	Michigan State	Rochester, Michigan
		Report	Barone 49', 63'	Stadium: Oakland Soccer Field; Attendance: 552; Referee: Ben Trevino

November 18, 2010	Penn	1–0 OT	Bucknell	Philadelphia, Pennsylvania
	Barreiro 92'	Report		Stadium: Rhodes Field

November 18, 2010	West Virginia	4–2	Xavier	Morgantown, West Virginia
	Tayou 23', 33', 50'; Etuk 82'	Report	Queree 4'; (own goal), 5'	Stadium: Dick Dlesk Soccer Stadium; Attendance: 513; Referee: Andrew Chapin

=== Second Round ===
November 21, 2010	#13 Butler	0–1	Michigan State	Indianapolis, Indiana
		Report	Ricondo 85'	Stadium: Sellick Bowl; Attendance: 1,381

November 21, 2010	#15 Penn State	4–1	Old Dominion	University Park, Pennsylvania
	Hertzog 27', 73', 82'; Tyler 78'	Report	Harmon 14'	Stadium: Jeffrey Field; Attendance: 519; Referee: Mark Gorak

November 21, 2010	#4 North Carolina	0–0 (5–4 p)	Georgetown	Chapel Hill, North Carolina
		Report		Stadium: Fetzer Field; Attendance: 651; Referee: Peter Dhima
	Penalties
	Urso (penalty scored); McKinney (penalty scored); Anibaba (penalty scored); Martinez (penalty scored); Walters (penalty scored)		(penalty scored) Christianson; (penalty scored) Verdi; (penalty missed) C'deBaca; (penalty scored) Nealis; (penalty scored) Diggs

November 21, 2010	#14 Indiana	5–1	Tulsa	Bloomington, Indiana
	Adlard 41'; Kotlov 45'; Petts 52'; Bruin 73', 79'	Report	McInnes 53'	Stadium: Bill Armstrong Stadium; Attendance: 1,057; Referee: Landis Wiley

November 21, 2010	#1 Louisville	3–1	College of Charleston	Louisville, Kentucky
	Deleon 20'; Rolfe 84'; Campbell 89'	Report	Flatley 25'	Stadium: Cardinal Park Soccer and Track Stadium; Attendance: 5,197; Referee: Shane Butler

November 21, 2010	#8 UCLA	4–1	Sacramento State	Los Angeles, California
	Hoffman 55', 73'; Williams 58'; Chavez 85'	Report	Carranza 87'	Stadium: Drake Stadium; Attendance: 835; Referee: Alex Gorin

November 21, 2010	#6 California	2–1 OT	UC Santa Barbara	Berkeley, California
	Carrasco 89'; Paul 100'	Report	Tetteh 82'	Stadium: Edwards Stadium; Attendance: 1,620; Referee: Mike Kampmeinert

November 21, 2010	#7 South Carolina	1–0 OT	Duke	Columbia, South Carolina
	Baladez 100'	Report		Stadium: Eugene E. Stone III Stadium; Attendance: 1,872; Referee: Bill Dittmar

November 21, 2010	#11 UConn	1–1 (6–7 p)	Brown	Storrs, Connecticut
	Diouf 87'	Report	Gorman 8'	Stadium: Morrone Stadium; Attendance: 2,719; Referee: Lou Labbadia
	Penalties
	Alvarez (penalty scored); Cascio (penalty scored); Diop (penalty missed); Diouf (penalty scored); Ponce (penalty scored); Wharf (penalty scored); Karppinen (penalty scored); Wasserman (penalty missed)		(penalty scored) McNamara (penalty scored); (penalty scored) Gorman; (penalty scored) Mandel; (penalty scored) Remick; (penalty missed) Smith; (penalty scored) Grandstrand; (penalty scored) Walls; (penalty scored) Hayward

November 21, 2010	#16 Ohio State	2–1	Providence	Columbus, Ohio
	Warzycha 58'; Vallejo 72'	Report	Davis 85'	Stadium: Jesse Owens Memorial Stadium; Attendance: 477; Referee: Khalaf Al-Latayfeh

November 21, 2010	#9 Notre Dame	1–2 OT	Dartmouth	South Bend, Indiana
	Perry 74'	Report	Olsen 65', 100'	Stadium: Alumni Stadium; Attendance: 665; Referee: Rich Grady

November 21, 2010	#10 Michigan	2–1 OT	UCF	Ann Arbor, Michigan
	Meram 50'; Alashe 95'	Report	Keown-Robson 9'	Stadium: U-M Soccer Stadium; Attendance: 2,742; Referee: Abbey Okulaja

November 21, 2010	#2 Maryland	4–0	Penn	College Park, Maryland
	Stertzer 9'; Kassel 26'; Young 44'; Mullins 88'	Report		Stadium: Ludwig Field; Attendance: 2,401; Referee: Benjamin Jones

November 21, 2010	#5 SMU	2–2 (5–3 p)	Creighton	University Park, Texas
	Castillo 79'; Ivo 90'	Report	Finlay 25'; Castillo 81'	Stadium: Westcott Field; Attendance: 524; Referee: Misail Tsapos
	Penalties
	Soto (penalty scored); Hickey (penalty scored); Cruz (penalty scored); Nelson (penalty scored); Ivo (penalty scored)		(penalty scored) Castillo; (penalty missed) Gomez; (penalty scored) Moran; (penalty scored) Clark

November 21, 2010	#3 Akron	3–2	West Virginia	Akron, Ohio
		Report		Stadium: FirstEnergy Stadium; Attendance: 2,825

November 21, 2010	#9 William & Mary	0–0 (4–3 p)	UMBC	Williamsburg, Virginia
		Report		Stadium: Albert–Daly Field; Attendance: 1,206; Referee: Mark Kadlecik
	Penalties
	Abrigo (penalty scored); Anderson (penalty scored); Patel (penalty scored); DiNuzzo (penalty scored)		(penalty scored) Bulls; (penalty missed) Houapeu; (penalty scored) Williams; (penalty scored) Welsh; (penalty missed) Waraksa

=== Third Round ===
November 28, 2010	#6 California	2–0	Brown	Berkeley, California
	Fitzpatrick 30'; (own goal), 53'	Report		Stadium: Edwards Stadium; Attendance: 2,370; Referee: Alex Gorin

November 28, 2010	#3 Akron	2–1	#14 Indiana	Akron, Ohio
	Nanchoff 53'; Mattocks 55'	Report	Adlard 82'	Stadium: FirstEnergy Stadium; Attendance: 3,225; Referee: Hilario Grajeda

November 28, 2010	#8 UCLA	2–1 2OT	Dartmouth	Los Angeles, California
	Arreola 26', 110'	Report	Giudicelli 60'	Stadium: Drake Stadium; Attendance: 902; Referee: Mohamed Mahmoud

November 28, 2010	#2 Maryland	1–0	#15 Penn State	College Park, Maryland
	Kemp 88'	Report		Stadium: Ludwig Field; Referee: Mark Kadlecik

November 28, 2010	#4 North Carolina	1–1 (5–4 p)	Michigan State	Chapel Hill, North Carolina
	Martinez 90'	Report	Saydee 65'	Stadium: Fetzer Field; Attendance: 776; Referee: Alex Prus
	Penalties
	Farfan (penalty scored); Urso (penalty scored); McKinney (penalty scored); Anibaba (penalty scored); Martinez (penalty scored)		(penalty scored) Barone; (penalty missed) Saydee; (penalty scored) Bega; (penalty scored) Rosendall; (penalty scored) Thompson

November 28, 2010	#7 South Carolina	1–3	#10 Michigan	Columbia, South Carolina
	Traynor (red card) 65'; Arthur 84'	Report	Meram 64', 81'; Saad 71'	Stadium: Eugene E. Stone III Stadium; Attendance: 2,256

November 28, 2010	#1 Louisville	2–1	#16 Ohio State	Louisville, Kentucky
	Campbell 24'; Berry 63'	Report	McAnena 52'	Stadium: Cardinal Park Soccer and Track Stadium; Attendance: 4,251

November 28, 2010	#5 SMU	1–0	#9 William & Mary	University Park, Texas
	Soto 11'	Report		Stadium: Westcott Field; Attendance: 677; Referee: Timothy Debysingh

=== Quarterfinals ===
December 3, 2010	#4 North Carolina	1–1 (4–2 p)	#5 SMU	Chapel Hill, North Carolina
5:30pm EST	Urso 10'	Report	Ivo 5'	Stadium: Fetzer Field; Attendance: 1,763; Referee: Chris Penso
	Penalties
	Farfan (penalty scored); Urso (penalty scored); McKinney (penalty scored); Anibaba (penalty scored)		(penalty missed) Soto; (penalty scored) Hickey; (penalty missed) Cruz; (penalty scored) Kalis

December 4, 2010	#3 Akron	3–3	#6 California	Akron, Ohio
8:30pm EST	Nanchoff 41'; Caldwell 42'; Kitchen 76'	Report	Avalos 31'; Salciccia 57'; Fitzpatrick 89'	Stadium: FirstEnergy Stadium; Attendance: 3,442; Referee: Peter Dhima
	Penalties
	Nanchoff (penalty missed); Kitchen (penalty scored); Valentin (penalty scored); Caldwell (penalty missed); Sarkodie (penalty scored)		Jimenez (penalty missed); Soares (penalty scored); Carrasco (penalty missed); Paul (penalty missed); Avalos (penalty scored)

December 4, 2010	#1 Louisville	5–4	#8 UCLA	Louisville, Kentucky
5:30pm EST	Rolfe 29', 48'; Campbell 40'; Deleon 56'; Horton 90'	Report	Arreola 8'; Rowe 18'; Hoffman 33'; Chavez 81'	Stadium: Cardinal Park Soccer and Track Stadium; Attendance: 5,467; Referee: Abby Okulaga

December 4, 2010	#2 Maryland	2–3 2OT	#10 Michigan	College Park, Maryland
8:30pm EST	Townsend 17'; Herrick 79'	Report	Quijano 50'; Meram 60'; Pereira 104'	Stadium: Ludwig Field; Attendance: 3,536; Referee: Chico Grajeda

=== Semifinals ===
December 10, 2010	#1 Louisville	2–1	#4 North Carolina	Santa Barbara, California
5:30pm EST	Berry 59'; Horton 90'	Report	McCarthy 62'	Stadium: Harder Stadium; Referee: Michael Kennedy

December 10, 2010	#3 Akron	2–1	#10 Michigan	Santa Barbara, California
8:30pm EST	Kitchen 33'; Sarkodie 74'	Report	Meram 2'	Stadium: Harder Stadium; Attendance: 7,560; Referee: Alex Gorin

=== Championship ===
December 12, 2010	#1 Louisville	0–1	#3 Akron	Santa Barbara, California
4:00pm EST		Report	Caldwell 79'	Stadium: Harder Stadium; Attendance: 9,672; Referee: Chico Grajeda

== Goal scorers ==
5 goals

- (Iraq) Justin Meram - Michigan

3 goals

- (United States) Scott Caldwell - Akron
- (Jamaica) Darren Mattocks - Akron
- (United States) Ethan Finlay - Creighton
- (United States) Colby Meyer - Notre Dame
- (United States) Andrew Olsen - Dartmouth
- (United States) Charlie Campbell - Louisville
- (United States) Colin Rolfe - Louisville
- (United States) Corey Hertzog - Penn St.
- (United States) Eder Arreola - UCLA
- (United States) Chandler Hoffman - UCLA
- (Cameroon) Franck Tayou - West Virginia

2 goals

- (United States) Perry Kitchen - Akron
- (United States) Michael Nanchoff - Akron
- (United States) John Fitzpatrick - California
- (New Zealand) Nik Robson - Central Florida
- (United States) Cole Grossman - Duke
- (United States) Andy Adlard - Indiana
- (United States) Will Bruin - Indiana
- (United States) Nick DeLeon - Louisville
- (United States) Austin Berry - Louisville
- (United States) Aaron Horton - Louisville
- (United States) Domenic Barone - Michigan St.
- (United States) Wilder Arboleda - Providence
- (United States) Matt Marcin - Providence
- (United States) Ernesto Carranza - Sacramento St.
- (Brazil) Arthur Ivo - SMU
- (Scotland) Ashley McInnes - Tulsa
- (United States) Victor Chavez - UCLA

1 goal

- (United States) Kofi Sarkodie - Akron
- (Canada) Kyle Bekker - Boston College
- (United States) Taylor Gorman - Brown
- (United States) Austin Mandel - Brown
- (United States) Jon Okafor - Brown
- (United States) Anthony Avalos - California
- (United States) Servando Carrasco - California
- (United States) Davis Paul - California
- (United States) Tony Salciccia - California
- (United States) Yaron Bacher - Central Florida
- (New Zealand) Ben Hunt - Central Florida
- (United States) Ross Kelly - Coastal Carolina
- (United States) Andy Craven - College of Charleston
- (United States) Shawn Ferguson - College of Charleston
- (United States) Sean Flatley - College of Charleston
- (United States) Francis Twohig - College of Charleston
- (Senegal) Mamadou Diouf - Connecticut
- (United States) Sergio Castillo - Creighton
- (United States) Jose Gomez - Creighton
- (United States) Tyler Polak - Creighton
- (United States) Aaron Gaide - Dartmouth
- (United States) Bryan Giudicelli - Dartmouth
- (Zimbabwe) Lucky Mkosana - Dartmouth
- (United States) Nick Pappas - Dartmouth
- (United States) Aaron Schoenfeld - ETSU
- (United States) Jaron Westbrook - ETSU
- (United States) Ian Christianson - Georgetown
- (United States) Chandler Diggs - Georgetown
- (United States) Andy Riemer - Georgetown
- (United States) Nikita Kotlov - Indiana
- (United States) Harrison Petts - Indiana
- (United States) Jason Herrick - Maryland
- (United States) Matt Kassel - Maryland
- (United States) Taylor Kemp - Maryland
- (United States) Patrick Mullins - Maryland
- (United States) John Stertzer - Maryland
- (United States) Casey Townsend - Maryland
- (United States) Greg Young - Maryland
- (United States) Latif Alashe - Michigan
- (Brazil) Fabio Pereira - Michigan
- (United States) Jeff Quijano - Michigan
- (Lebanon) Soony Saad - Michigan
- (United States) Jeff Ricondo - Michigan St.
- (United States) Cyrus Saydee - Michigan St.
- (United States) Devon Sandoval - New Mexico
- (Uruguay) Enzo Martínez - North Carolina
- (United States) Stephen McCarthy - North Carolina
- (United States) Kirk Urso - North Carolina
- (United States) Dillon Powers - Notre Dame
- (United States) Austin McAnena - Ohio State
- (United States) Omar Vallejo - Ohio State
- (Poland) Konrad Warzycha - Ohio State
- (United States) Chris Harman - Old Dominion
- (United States) Alex Vaughan - Old Dominion
- (United States) Christian Barreiro - Penn
- (United States) Jordan Tyler - Penn State
- (United States) Antoine Hoppenot - Princeton
- (United States) Greg Davis - Providence
- (United States) Brian Grisell - Providence
- (United States) Toussaint McClure - Providence
- (United States) Chris Bettencourt - Sacramento St.
- (United States) Eric Masch - Santa Clara
- (United States) Juan Castillo - SMU
- (United States) Josue Soto - SMU
- (United States) Sam Arthur - South Carolina
- (United States) Bradlee Baladez - South Carolina
- (United States) Kevin Olson - St. Peter's
- (South Africa) Lebongang Pila - St. Peter's
- (United States) Kyle Cumings - Tulsa
- (United States) Kelyn Rowe - UCLA
- (United States) Reed Williams - UCLA
- (Ghana) Waid Ibrahim - UC Santa Barbara
- (Ghana) Michael Tetteh - UC Santa Barbara
- (United States) Andrew Bulls - UMBC
- (Ivory Coast) Levi Houapeu - UMBC
- (United States) Uwen Etuk - West Virginia
- (Zimbabwe) Abel Sebele - West Virginia
- (Cameroon) Uzi Tayou - West Virginia
- (Jersey) James Queree - Xavier

Own goals

- (United States) Eric Robertson - Brown (playing against California)
- (United States) Ray Gaddis - West Virginia (playing against Xavier)

== See also ==
- NCAA Men's Soccer Championship
