= Big Ten Conference Men's Soccer Freshman of the Year =

- Awarded for: the best freshman in the Big Ten Conference
- Country: United States

History
- First award: 1991
- Most recent: Rodrigo Neri, Maryland

The Big Ten Conference Men's Soccer Freshman of the Year is an annual award given to the top freshman college soccer player in the Big Ten Conference.

== Key ==
| † | Co-Players of the Year |

== Winners ==
| Season | Player | School | Reference |
|---|---|---|---|
| 1991 | Todd Yeagley | Indiana | |
| 1992 | Stuart Reid | Penn State | |
| 1993 | Rich Wilmot | Penn State | |
| 1994 | Jason Wolff | Michigan State | |
| 1995 | Lazo Alavanja | Indiana | |
| 1996 | Dema Kovalenko | Indiana | |
| 1997 | Nick Garcia | Indiana | |
| 1998 | Jon Monebrake | Ohio State | |
| 1999 | John Tomaino | Indiana | |
| 2000 | Justin Cook | Ohio State | |
| 2001 | Mike Ambersley | Indiana | |
| 2001 | Chad Severs | Penn State | |
| 2002 | Brian Plotkin | Indiana | |
| 2003 | Gerardo Alvarez | Northwestern | |
| 2003 | Jed Zayner | Indiana | |
| 2004 | Richard Costanzo | Penn State | |
| 2005 | Lee Nguyen | Indiana | |
| 2006 | Darren Yeagle | Indiana | |
| 2007 | Piero Bellizzi | Northwestern | |
| 2008 | Will Bruin | Indiana | |
| 2009 | Kevin Cope | Michigan State | |
| 2009 | Matt Lampson | Ohio State | |
| 2010 | Soony Saad | Michigan | |
| 2011 | Eriq Zavaleta | Indiana | |
| 2012 | Joey Calistri | Northwestern | |
| 2013 | Tommy Thompson | Indiana | |
| 2014 | Grant Lillard | Indiana | |
| 2015 | Francis Atuahene | Michigan | |
| 2016 | Giuseppe Barone | Michigan State | |
| 2017 | Mason Toye | Indiana | |
| 2018 | Jack Maher | Indiana | |
| 2019 | Aidan Morris | Indiana | |
| 2020 | Laurence Wootton | Ohio State | |
| 2021 | Joshua Bolma | Maryland | |
| 2022 | Cole Cruthers | Rutgers | |
| 2022 | Jonathan Stout | Michigan State | |
| 2023 | Kimani Stewart-Baynes | Maryland | |
| 2024 | Dean Boltz | Wisconsin | |
| 2025 | Peter Soudan | Michigan State | |
| 2026 | Rodrigo Neri | Maryland | |
