= 2025 Big Ten men's soccer tournament =

Postseason men's soccer tournament

- Classification: Division I
- Teams: 4
- Matches: 3
- Attendance: 5,936
- Site: Ludwig Field; College Park, Maryland
- Champions: UCLA (1st title)
- Winning coach: Ryan Jorden (1st title)
- MVP: Sergi Solans Ormo (UCLA)
- Broadcast: BTN, FS2

2025 Big Ten Conference men's soccer standings
	Conf.						Overall
Team	W		L		T	PCT	W		L		T	PCT
No. 7 Maryland ‍†‍‍^{y}	8	–	0	–	2	.900	13	–	2	–	4	.789
No. 1 Washington ‍‍‍^{y}	7	–	3	–	0	.700	16	–	6	–	2	.708
Michigan ‍‍‍^{y}	6	–	2	–	3	.682	12	–	4	–	4	.700
UCLA ‍‍‡‍^{y}	5	–	3	–	2	.600	8	–	6	–	5	.553
No. 22 Indiana ‍‍‍^{y}	5	–	5	–	0	.500	12	–	6	–	1	.658
Wisconsin ‍‍‍	4	–	6	–	0	.400	8	–	8	–	0	.500
Northwestern ‍‍‍	3	–	5	–	2	.400	8	–	6	–	3	.559
Rutgers ‍‍‍	3	–	5	–	2	.400	8	–	6	–	3	.559
Ohio State ‍‍‍	3	–	7	–	0	.300	6	–	10	–	0	.375
Michigan State ‍‍‍	2	–	5	–	3	.350	5	–	8	–	3	.406
Penn State ‍‍‍	1	–	6	–	3	.250	5	–	8	–	4	.412
† – Conference champion ‡ – 2025 B1G tournament champion y – Invited to the 2025 NCAA Tournament; As of May 2, 2026; Rankings from United Soccer Coaches; Source: Big Ten

The 2025 Big Ten Conference men's soccer tournament the post-season men's soccer tournament for the Big Ten Conference held from November 12 to 16, 2025. Defending champions, Ohio State, failed to qualify. Fourth seed UCLA finished as tournament champions after defeating Michigan 5–0 in the Final. As tournament champions, UCLA earned the Big Ten's automatic place in the 2025 NCAA Division I men's soccer tournament.

== Seeding ==
The top four teams in the regular season earned a spot in the 2025 tournament. Teams were seeded based on regular season conference record and tiebreakers were used to determine seedings of teams that finished with the same record.

Seed	School	Conference record	Points
1	Maryland	8–0–2	26
2	Washington	7–3–0	21
3	Michigan	6–2–2	20
4	UCLA	5–3–2	17

== Bracket ==
Semifinals; November 12
2	Washington	0
3	Michigan	2
1	Maryland	0
4	UCLA	2

Championship; November 16
3	Michigan	0
4	UCLA	5

== Results ==
=== Semifinals ===
November 12, 2025	No. 2 Washington	0–2	No. 3 Michigan	College Park, MD
4:00 p.m. EST	Joe Dale (yellow card) 40'; Asher Hestad (yellow card) 52'; (yellow card) 77' Team	Report	23' Nicholas Cassiday; (yellow card) 39' Oliver Martin; 69' (pen.) Mitar Mitrovic; (yellow card) 73' Patrick O'Toole; (red card) 90' Kyle Pierson	Stadium: Ludwig Field; Attendance: 489; Referee: Calin Radosav; Assistant referees: Sean West; Nick Liu; Fourth official: Youssef Elmessoussi

November 12, 2025	No. 1 Maryland	0–2	No. 4 UCLA	College Park, MD
7:00 p.m. EST	Ritarita (yellow card) 85'	Report	(yellow card) 32' Schinieder Mimy; (yellow card) 59' (goal) 74' Ander Marticorena; (yellow card) 78' Adrian Aguilar; 84' Sergi Solans	Stadium: Ludwig Field; Attendance: 4,876; Referee: Daniel Radford; Assistant referees: Nick Karnovsky; Matthew Richardson; Fourth official: Austin Saini

=== Final ===
November 16, 2025	No. 3 Michigan	0–5	No. 4 UCLA	College Park, MD
3:00 p.m. EST		Report	13', 61' Konstantinos Georgallides; 38', 52', 60' Sergi Solans	Stadium: Ludwig Field; Attendance: 571; Referee: Mike Stutt; Assistant referees: Art Arustamyan; Shane Richards; Fourth official: Jordan Gray

== Statistics ==
=== Goalscorers ===
There were 9 goals scored in 3 matches, for an average of 3 goals per match (as of November 17, 2024).

4 goals

- (Spain) Sergi Solans – UCLA

2 goals

- (Greece) Konstantinos Georgallides – UCLA

1 goal

- (United States) Nicholas Cassiday – Michigan
- (Spain) Ander Marticorena – UCLA
- (Serbia) Mitar Mitrović – Michigan

== All-Tournament team ==
Player	Team
**2025 B1G Men's Soccer All-Tournament team**
Tristen Rose	Maryland
Chris Steinleitner	Maryland
Nicholas Cassiday	Michigan
Matthew Fisher	Michigan
Mitar Mitrovich	Michigan
Konstantinos Georgallides	UCLA
Ander Marticorena	UCLA
Shakir Nixon	UCLA
**Sergi Solans Ormo**	UCLA
Joe Dale	Washington
Connor Lofy	Washington

MVP in Bold
