= Chaka Daley =

Canadian soccer player and coach

Personal information
- Full name: Chaka K. Daley
- Date of birth: April 9, 1974 (age 52)
- Place of birth: Toronto, Ontario, Canada
- Positions: Defender; striker

Team information
- Current team: Michigan Wolverines

College career
| Years | Team | Apps | (Gls) |
| 1992–1996 | Providence Friars | | |

Senior career*
| Years | Team | Apps | (Gls) |
| 1996–1998 | Rhode Island Stingrays | | |
| 1998–1999 | Boston Bulldogs | 23 | |
| 1999 | New England Revolution | 2 | (0) |

Managerial career
- 1996–1999: Providence Friars (assistant)
- 2000–2011: Providence Friars
- 2012–: Michigan Wolverines
- * Club domestic league appearances and goals

Chaka K. Daley (born April 9, 1974) is a Canadian soccer coach and former professional player. He is the head coach of the Michigan Wolverines men's soccer team.

== Club career ==
On June 14, 1999, Daley was signed by the New England Revolution from the Boston Bulldogs of the USL A-League. He made two appearances for the team.
