= 2010 Big Ten men's soccer tournament =

2010 Big Ten Men's soccer tournament
- Classification: Division I
- Teams: 7
- Site: Jeffrey Field; State College, PA
- Champions: Michigan (1st title)
- Winning coach: Steve Burns (1st title)
- Broadcast: Big Ten Network
Big Ten Men's soccer tournament
«2009	2011»

2010 Big Ten Conference men's soccer standings
	Conf.					Overall
Team	W		L		T	W		L		T
No. 20 Indiana +	4	–	1	–	1	10	–	8	–	2
No. 4 Michigan ‡	4	–	2	–	0	17	–	5	–	3
No. 17 Ohio State +	4	–	2	–	0	11	–	6	–	3
No. 18 Penn State +	2	–	3	–	1	14	–	8	–	1
Northwestern	2	–	3	–	1	8	–	8	–	2
No. 15 Michigan State +	2	–	4	–	0	13	–	7	–	2
Wisconsin	1	–	4	–	1	4	–	13	–	3
‡ – 2010 B1G Tournament champion + – Invited to the 2010 NCAA tournament; As of August 26, 2010; Rankings from NSCAA

The 2010 Big Ten men's soccer tournament was the 20th edition of the tournament. It determined the Big Ten Conference's automatic berth into the 2010 NCAA Division I Men's Soccer Championship. The tournament was held at Pennsylvania State University in State College, Pennsylvania. The number 3 seeded Michigan defeated the number 4 seeded Penn State in the Big Ten Tournament Championship game 4 to 1 to win their first tournament championship.

== Bracket ==
Quarterfinals; November 11
4	Penn State	3
5	Northwestern	1
2	Ohio State	0(4)
7	Wisconsin	0(5)
3	Michigan	2
6	Michigan State	1

Semifinals; November 12
1	Indiana	1
4	Penn State	2
7	Wisconsin	0
3	Michigan	1

Championship; November 14
4	Penn State	1
3	Michigan	4

== Schedule ==
=== Quarterfinals ===
November 11, 2010	#3 Michigan	2–1	#6 Michigan State	State College, Pennsylvania
10:00 a.m. EDT		Report		Stadium: Jeffrey Field; Referee: Sorin Stoica; Assistant referees: Cien Asora; Cien Asora; Fourth official: Jason Krnac

November 11, 2010	#2 Ohio State	0–0 (a.e.t.) (4–5 p)	#7 Wisconsin	State College, Pennsylvania
12:30 p.m. EDT				Stadium: Jeffrey Field

November 11, 2010	#4 Penn State	3–1	#5 Northwestern	State College, Pennsylvania
3:00 p.m. EDT		Report		Stadium: Jeffrey Field; Attendance: 4,332; Referee: Fotis Bazakos; Assistant referees: Mike Lukashunas; Hilario Grajeda; Fourth official: Hilario Grajeda

=== Semifinals ===
November 12, 2010	#7 Wisconsin	0–1	#3 Michigan	State College, Pennsylvania
1:00 p.m. EDT		Report		Stadium: Jeffrey Field; Attendance: 2,246; Referee: Michael Kennedy; Assistant referees: Sorin Stoica; Jason Krnac; Fourth official: Mike Lukashunas

November 12, 2010	#1 Indiana	1–2	#4 Penn State	State College, Pennsylvania
3:30 p.m. EDT		Report		Stadium: Jeffrey Field; Attendance: 2,246; Referee: Hilario Grajeda; Assistant referees: Niko Bratsis; Cien Asoera; Fourth official: Fotis Bazakos

=== Final ===
November 14, 2010	#4 Penn State	1–4	#3 Michigan	State College, Pennsylvania
12:00 p.m. EDT		Report		Stadium: Jeffrey Field; Attendance: 1,836; Referee: Cien Asoera; Assistant referees: Mike Lukashunas; Niko Bratsis; Fourth official: Fotis Bazakos

== See also ==
- Big Ten Conference Men's Soccer Tournament
