= Charlie Campbell =

American soccer player

Personal information
- Full name: Charles Campbell
- Date of birth: January 5, 1988 (age 38)
- Place of birth: Mundelein, Illinois, United States
- Height: 5 ft 10 in (1.78 m)
- Position: Midfielder

Youth career
- 2006–2009: Virginia Tech Hokies
- 2010: Louisville Cardinals

Senior career*
Years	Team	Apps	(Gls)
2011–2012	Orlando City	33	(1)
2013	Ljungskile SK	3	(0)
- * Club domestic league appearances and goals as of January 23, 2013

Charlie Campbell (born January 5, 1988, in Mundelein, Illinois) is an American soccer player.

== Career ==
=== College and amateur ===
Campbell attended Mundelein High School and played club soccer for the Chicago Sockers, before going on to play college soccer at Virginia Tech. He started in 19 games for the Hokies during his freshman season in 2006, finishing the season with one goal and seven assists and being named to the All-ACC Freshman team. In 2007, he recorded a 'TEAM' save in preserving the Hokies' 1–0 win at then-No. 2 Connecticut in the NCAA Men's College Cup Regional Final. Campbell started at left back for the Hokies' first ever Final Four appearance. In 2008, Campbell suffered a knee injury and was awarded a medical redshirt. In 2010, Campbell transferred to the University of Louisville for his final year of eligibility and led the Cardinals to their first College Cup Final Four appearance in school history. Campbell finished third on the team in points registering six goals and two assists. After being crowned the 2010 Big East regular season and 2010 Big East tournament champions, the Cardinals entered the NCAA tournament as the number one overall seed with an undefeated record. The Cardinals lost to The University of Akron in the NCAA championship 1–0. Campbell was named to the 2010 College Cup All-tournament team and is the first player in NCAA Soccer history to play in two NCAA Final Four's with two separate schools. Campbell graduated with a bachelor's degree in finance from Virginia Tech and completed his Master's of Science from the University of Louisville.

=== Professional ===
Campbell was drafted in the second round, 35th overall, of the 2011 MLS SuperDraft by FC Dallas. He spent the entire preseason with the 2010 MLS Cup runners-up, and participated in the 2011 Disney Pro Soccer Classic, but was not offered a contract by the team.

Campbell signed for Orlando City of the USL Professional Division in May 2011. He made his professional debut on May 25, 2011, in a 2–0 win over the Richmond Kickers. After signing, Campbell made 13 appearances in the remaining 18 games during the 2011 USL PRO season. Orlando City won the 2011 regular season and 2011 USL Pro Championship with Campbell playing a key role in the championship game. Campbell also appeared in two U.S. Open Cup matches and made appearances in both the Bolton Wanderers and Newcastle United exhibition matches.

In 2012, Campbell appeared in 20 of 24 league matches for USL regular season champions Orlando City. Campbell also started both U.S. Open Cup matches for City while notching two assists. Following his one-goal and five-assist campaign, Campbell was awarded Clubman of the Year by manager Adrian Heath.

On January 21, 2013, Campbell signed a seven-month deal with Ljungskile SK in the Swedish second tier Superettan after trialing with the club for two weeks. His friend Patrick Hopkins, who plays defender for Ljungskile, had recommended Campbell to the club. Campbell suffered a career ending knee injury prior to the club's third match of the season.

== Honors ==
=== Orlando City ===
- USL Pro (1): 2011
