= Michigan Wolverines men's soccer =

Men's soccer team of the University of Michigan

- 2026 Michigan Wolverines men's soccer team
- Founded: 2000; 26 years ago
- University: University of Michigan
- Head coach: Chaka Daley (15th season)
- Conference: Big Ten
- Location: Ann Arbor, Michigan, US
- Stadium: U-M Soccer Stadium (capacity: 2,200)
- Nickname: Wolverines
- Colors: Maize and blue
Home	Away

NCAA tournament College Cup
- 2010

NCAA tournament Quarterfinals
- 2003, 2010

NCAA tournament Round of 16
- 2003, 2008, 2010, 2019

NCAA tournament appearances
- 2003, 2004, 2008, 2010, 2012, 2017, 2018, 2019, 2024, 2025

Conference tournament championships
- 2010

Conference regular season championships
- 2017

The Michigan Wolverines men's soccer team is the intercollegiate soccer program representing the University of Michigan in Ann Arbor. The Wolverines compete in the Big Ten Conference in Division I of the National Collegiate Athletic Association (NCAA), and play their home games at U-M Soccer Stadium.

Soccer was played at Michigan as a club sport for decades before the university approved varsity status in 1999; the varsity team played its first season in 2000. The program has made ten appearances in the NCAA tournament, reaching the quarterfinals in 2003 and the 2010 College Cup, and has won the Big Ten tournament in 2010 and the Big Ten regular-season title in 2017. The team has been coached by Chaka Daley since 2012.

== History ==
=== Club era ===
Men's soccer existed at Michigan as a club team for much of the 20th century; Steve Burns described it as having been "in continuous state of existence since 1921." Burns played for the club from 1984 to 1988 and returned to coach it in 1992. Under Burns, the club team won national club championships in 1997 and 1998. The athletic department had rejected three earlier proposals to elevate the team because of financial and Title IX concerns, before Burns compiled a 32-page report to persuade athletic director Bill Martin to grant varsity status. The university's board in control of intercollegiate athletics approved men's soccer and women's water polo as varsity sports on March 26, 1999.

=== Steve Burns era (2000–2011) ===
Burns became the program's first varsity head coach, and Michigan won its first varsity match 1–0 over DePaul on September 1, 2000. In 2003, the Wolverines finished second in the Big Ten and earned their first NCAA tournament berth as the twelfth seed. After beating Saint Peter's 6–2 in the second round, Michigan eliminated Notre Dame on penalties before losing 3–1 to Santa Clara in the quarterfinals, finishing a then-program-best 14–7–1. Forward Knox Cameron was named the 2003 Big Ten Player of the Year and became the program's first All-American. The Wolverines returned to the NCAA tournament in 2004 and 2008, when they reached the third round before losing 3–0 at Indiana.

The 2010 season was the most successful in program history. Michigan won its first Big Ten tournament title with a 4–1 win over host Penn State in the final, and as the tenth seed in the NCAA tournament defeated UCF in overtime and seventh-seeded South Carolina 3–1. A double-overtime goal from Fabio Pereira beat second-seeded Maryland 3–2 in the quarterfinals and sent Michigan to its first College Cup, where the Wolverines lost 2–1 to third-seeded Akron in the semifinals at Harder Stadium. The team finished 17–5–3, and Burns was named the FieldTurf NCAA Division I Coach of the Year. Freshman forward Soony Saad set program single-season records with 19 goals and 43 points and was named a second-team All-American, and Justin Meram was selected 15th overall by the Columbus Crew in the 2011 MLS SuperDraft.

After a 5–14–1 season in 2011, Burns resigned on November 30, 2011. He finished his varsity tenure with a 122–98–22 record, including a 27–38–8 mark in Big Ten play.

=== Chaka Daley era (2012–present) ===
Michigan hired Chaka Daley, who had coached Providence for twelve seasons, as the program's second head coach in December 2011. In his first season the Wolverines were Big Ten tournament runners-up and reached the second round of the NCAA tournament. In 2017, Michigan clinched its first Big Ten regular-season championship with a 2–1 double-overtime win at Maryland, with Francis Atuahene scoring the winning goal, and Daley was named Big Ten Coach of the Year. As the thirteenth seed, the Wolverines lost to Colgate in the second round after surrendering a two-goal lead. Atuahene was selected fourth overall by FC Dallas in the 2018 MLS SuperDraft.

Michigan reached the Big Ten tournament final in both 2018 and 2019. In 2018, the Wolverines advanced past Princeton on penalties before being eliminated by Notre Dame on penalties in the second round, and in 2019 they beat Wright State on penalties to reach the program's first Sweet 16 in nine years, where they lost 3–1 at Wake Forest. Defender Jackson Ragen, who was named Big Ten Defensive Player of the Year as a senior, was selected 33rd overall by the Chicago Fire in the 2021 MLS SuperDraft.

After three seasons without an NCAA berth, Michigan was the seventh seed in the 2024 Big Ten tournament and reached the final, losing 1–0 to Ohio State. The Wolverines then beat Robert Morris 2–0 for their first NCAA tournament win since 2012 before losing at Dayton in the second round. Jason Bucknor became the program's fourth first-round MLS SuperDraft pick when the LA Galaxy selected him in the 2025 MLS SuperDraft.

In 2025, Michigan went 12–4–4 overall and 6–2–2 in Big Ten play. The Wolverines lost the Big Ten tournament final 5–0 to UCLA, and lost 1–0 at home to Notre Dame in the first round of the NCAA tournament, the program's tenth appearance. Forward Nolan Miller was then selected ninth overall by Orlando City SC, the fifth first-round pick in program history. With a young roster in 2026, Michigan finished the regular season 3–8–5 and winless in the Big Ten at 0–6–4.

== Players ==
=== Current roster ===
As of November 6, 2026

Note: Flags indicate national team as defined under FIFA eligibility rules; some limited exceptions apply. Players may hold more than one non-FIFA nationality.

No.	Pos.	Nation	Player
0	GK	USA	Beau Barren
1	GK	CAN	Isaiah Goldson
2	DF	USA	Patrick O'Toole
3	DF	USA	Matthew Fisher
4	DF	USA	Camron Estala
5	DF	USA	Will Baker
6	DF	USA	Nick Nobles
7	MF	USA	Nico Pendleton
8	MF	USA	Michael Haikal
9	FW	USA	Grayson Elmquist
10	MF	USA	Duilio Herrera
11	FW	USA	Michael Ramirez
12	DF	USA	Jonathan Nabaka
13	MF	USA	Joah Reyna
14	MF	USA	Stefan Momcilovic
15	DF	USA	Andrew Craig
16	MF	ENG	Murphy Parker

No.	Pos.	Nation	Player
17	MF	USA	Joao Paulo Ramos
18	MF	USA	Landon Strohmeyer
19	MF	USA	Austin Su
20	GK	USA	Patrick Los
21	FW	USA	Jake Tatch
22	MF	USA	Kamau Brame
23	FW	USA	Guy Michaeli
24	FW	USA	Alex Gimple
25	DF	USA	Drew Diebolt
26	DF	USA	Tamer Ibsais
27	DF	USA	Dylan Davis
28	GK	USA	Alen Bean
29	FW	CAN	Thomas Fraser
30	GK	USA	Adam Ethridge
32	MF	USA	Kian Concepcion
33	DF	USA	Sebasthian Chavez

=== Notable alumni ===
This is a list of former players who have received international caps or have played professional soccer.

- (United States) Tyler Arnone
- (Ghana) Francis Atuahene
- (United States) Marcello Borges
- (United States) Jason Bucknor
- (United States) Knox Cameron
- (England) Luke Coulson
- (United States) Lars Eckenrode
- (United States) Adam Grinwis
- (United States) Michael Holody
- (United States) Evan Louro
- (United States) Peri Marosevic
- (Iraq) Justin Meram
- (United States) Robbie Mertz
- (Ghana) Kofi Opare
- (United States) Jackson Ragen
- (England) Matt Rickard
- (Lebanon) Soony Saad
- (United States) Kevin Taylor
- (United States) Marcos Ugarte

=== All-Americans ===
Year	Player	Position
2003	Knox Cameron	Forward
2008	Michael Holody	Midfielder
2010	Soony Saad	Forward
2018	Jack Hallahan	Forward

=== First-round MLS SuperDraft picks ===
Draft	Player	Pick	Team
2009	Peri Marosevic	5	FC Dallas
2011	Justin Meram	15	Columbus Crew
2018	Francis Atuahene	4	FC Dallas
2025	Jason Bucknor	20	LA Galaxy
2026	Nolan Miller	9	Orlando City SC

== Coaches ==
=== Coaching staff ===
Position	Name
Head coach	(Canada) Chaka Daley
Associate head coach	Kevin Anderson
Assistant coach	Jhojan Obando
Assistant coach	Mauro Fuzetti

=== Head coaching history ===
Coach	Tenure	Record	Big Ten
Steve Burns	2000–2011	122–98–22	27–38–8
Chaka Daley	2012–present	119–103–57	47–45–31

Through November 4, 2026.

== Facilities ==
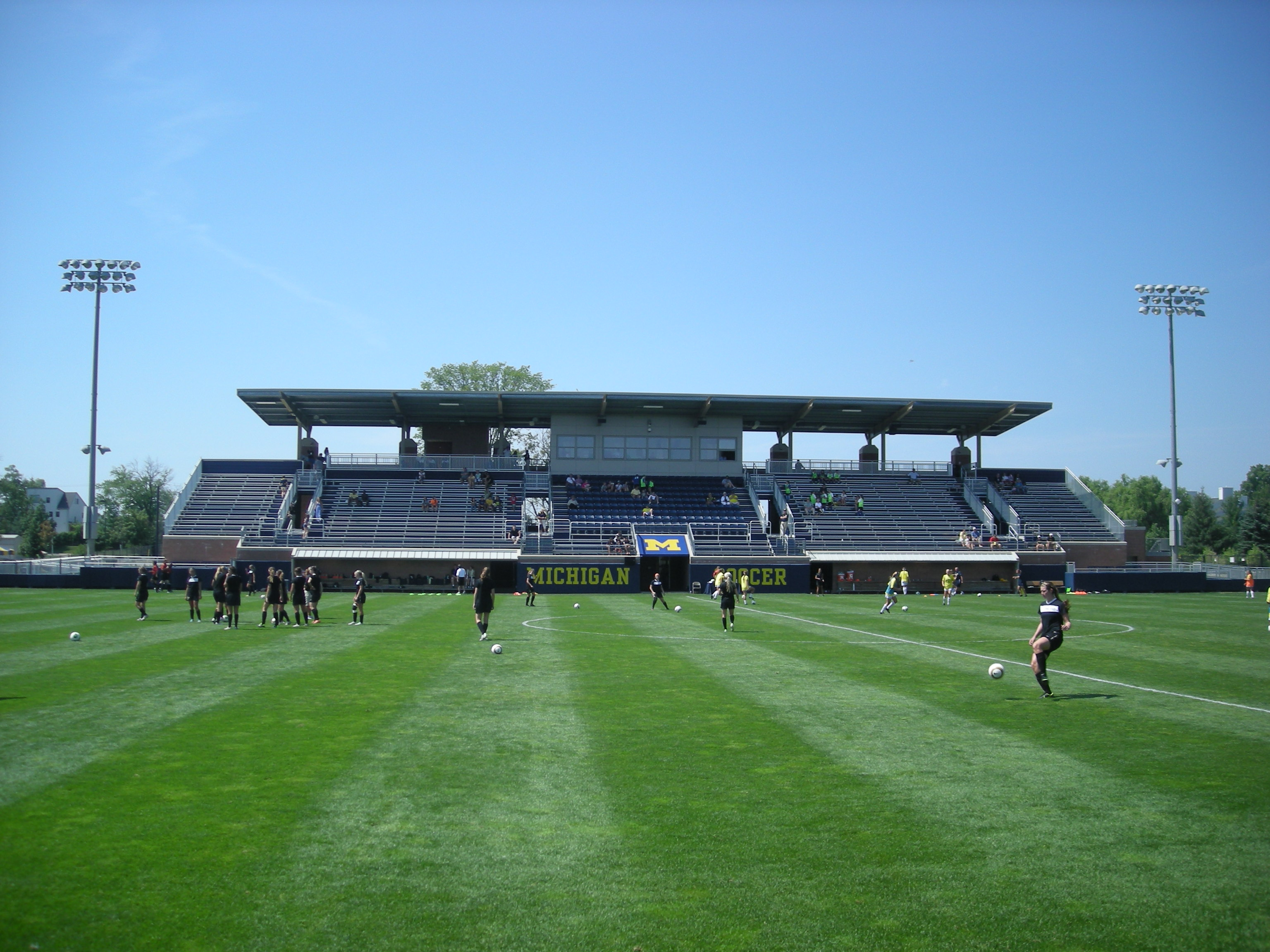
U-M Soccer Stadium in 2013

Michigan played its first varsity seasons at Elbel Field and then the U-M Soccer Field. The U-M Soccer Complex opened in 2008, and the men's team won the complex's first NCAA tournament match, against UC Davis on November 25, 2008. U-M Soccer Stadium was built on the site of the complex at a cost of $6 million, funded by athletic department resources and gifts, and opened in 2010 with a capacity of 2,200. The complex includes the stadium field and separate practice fields for the men's and women's teams; the stadium has covered stands on both sides of the field, a press box, separate locker rooms for both teams and an athletic medicine room. The men's team played its first game in the stadium on September 1, 2010, a 2–1 overtime win over Detroit, and the stadium was formally dedicated on September 17, 2010, when a record crowd of 3,503 watched Michigan draw 0–0 with Notre Dame.

== Colors and badge ==
The team colors of Michigan are maize and blue. The badge is shaped like a shield, with "Michigan" inscribed in maize on a blue background at the top, the word "Soccer" at the bottom and a block M in the middle.

== Supporters ==
The Michigan Ultras are the student support section for both the men's and the women's teams. The section sits in the student bleachers at U-M Soccer Stadium and is a registered student organization at the University of Michigan. The Ultras were founded in the spring of 2010 by Matthew Peven. Members support the teams through organized chanting and cheering.

== Seasons ==
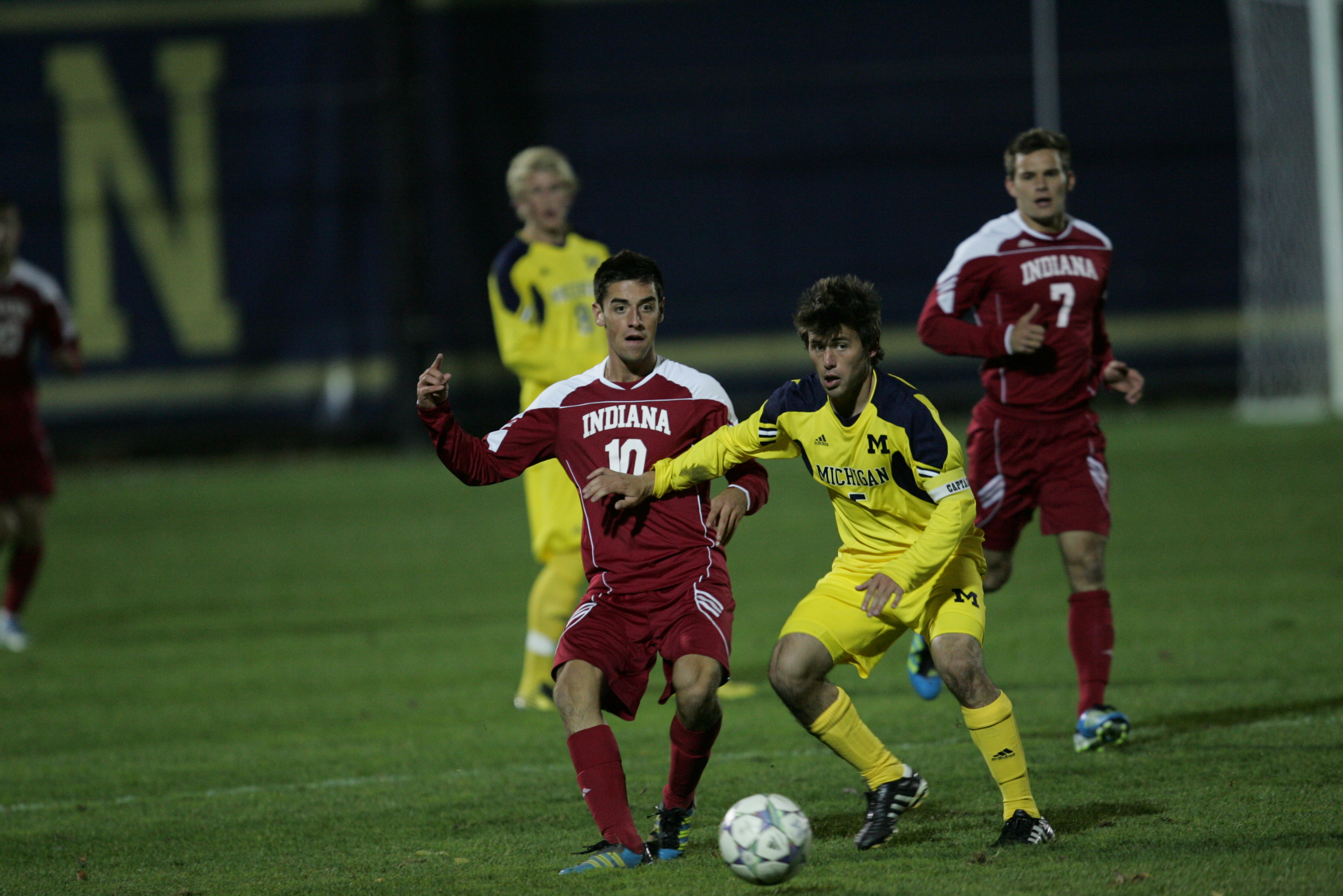
Michigan v Indiana in October 2011

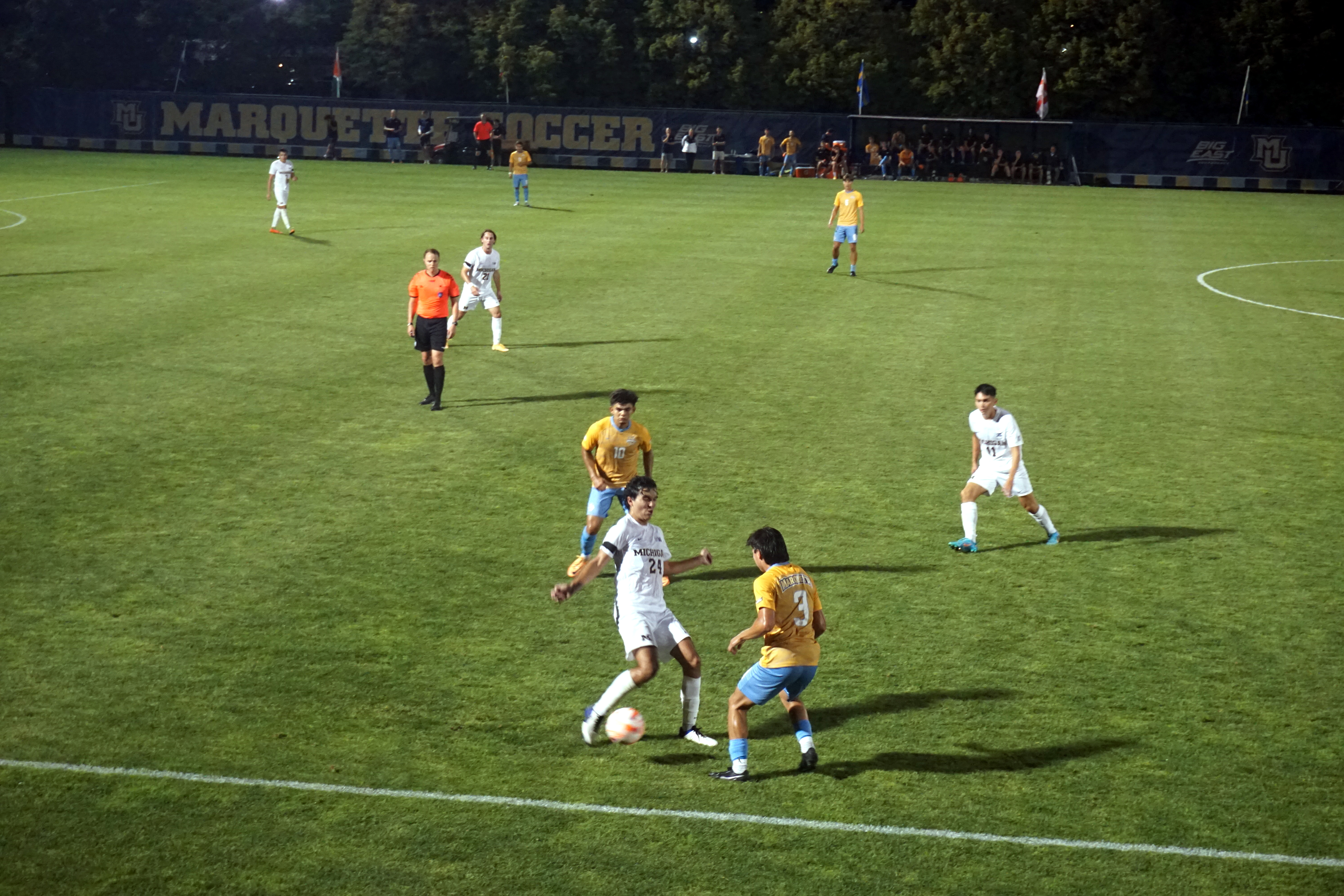
Michigan (in white) playing at Marquette in 2022

Year	Head coach	Record	Big Ten	Big Ten finish	Big Ten tournament	NCAA tournament
2000	Steve Burns	6–10–0	1–5–0	6th	Quarterfinals	–
2001	Steve Burns	10–7–1	3–3–0	5th	Semifinals	–
2002	Steve Burns	11–7–2	3–3–0	T–2nd	Runner-up	–
2003	Steve Burns	14–7–1	5–1–0	2nd	Quarterfinals	Quarterfinals
2004	Steve Burns	11–8–4	1–4–1	7th	Semifinals	Second round
2005	Steve Burns	8–10–1	2–4–0	T–5th	Quarterfinals	–
2006	Steve Burns	7–10–4	1–2–3	T–5th	Semifinals	–
2007	Steve Burns	10–7–2	0–4–2	7th	Quarterfinals	–
2008	Steve Burns	13–6–3	4–1–1	2nd	Semifinals	Third round
2009	Steve Burns	10–7–1	2–4–0	T–6th	Quarterfinals	–
2010	Steve Burns	17–5–3	4–2–0	T–2nd	Champions	College Cup
2011	Steve Burns	5–14–1	1–5–0	6th	Quarterfinals	–
2012	Chaka Daley	11–10–1	3–2–1	T–3rd	Runner-up	Second round
2013	Chaka Daley	8–7–3	3–3–0	4th	Quarterfinals	–
2014	Chaka Daley	6–9–3	3–3–2	T–6th	Quarterfinals	–
2015	Chaka Daley	8–6–4	3–3–2	6th	Quarterfinals	–
2016	Chaka Daley	4–11–4	1–6–1	8th	Quarterfinals	–
2017	Chaka Daley	12–6–2	6–1–1	1st	Quarterfinals	Second round
2018	Chaka Daley	12–5–4	4–2–2	T–3rd	Runner-up	Second round
2019	Chaka Daley	11–5–6	4–1–3	3rd	Runner-up	Third round
2020	Chaka Daley	6–4–1	5–3–1	3rd	Semifinals	–
2021	Chaka Daley	8–7–3	4–3–1	4th	Semifinals	–
2022	Chaka Daley	4–10–3	1–6–1	9th	–	–
2023	Chaka Daley	5–6–7	2–1–5	5th	Semifinals	–
2024	Chaka Daley	9–5–7	2–3–5	7th	Runner-up	Second round
2025	Chaka Daley	12–4–4	6–2–2	3rd	Runner-up	First round
2026	Chaka Daley	3–8–5	0–6–4		–	–

== Honours ==
- Big Ten Conference regular season
  - Champions (1): 2017
- Big Ten tournament
  - Champions (1): 2010
  - Runners-up (6): 2002, 2012, 2018, 2019, 2024, 2025
- National club championships (pre-varsity): 1997, 1998

== See also ==
- Michigan Wolverines women's soccer
