= FirstEnergy Stadium–Cub Cadet Field =

Soccer stadium in Akron, Ohio

FirstEnergy Stadium
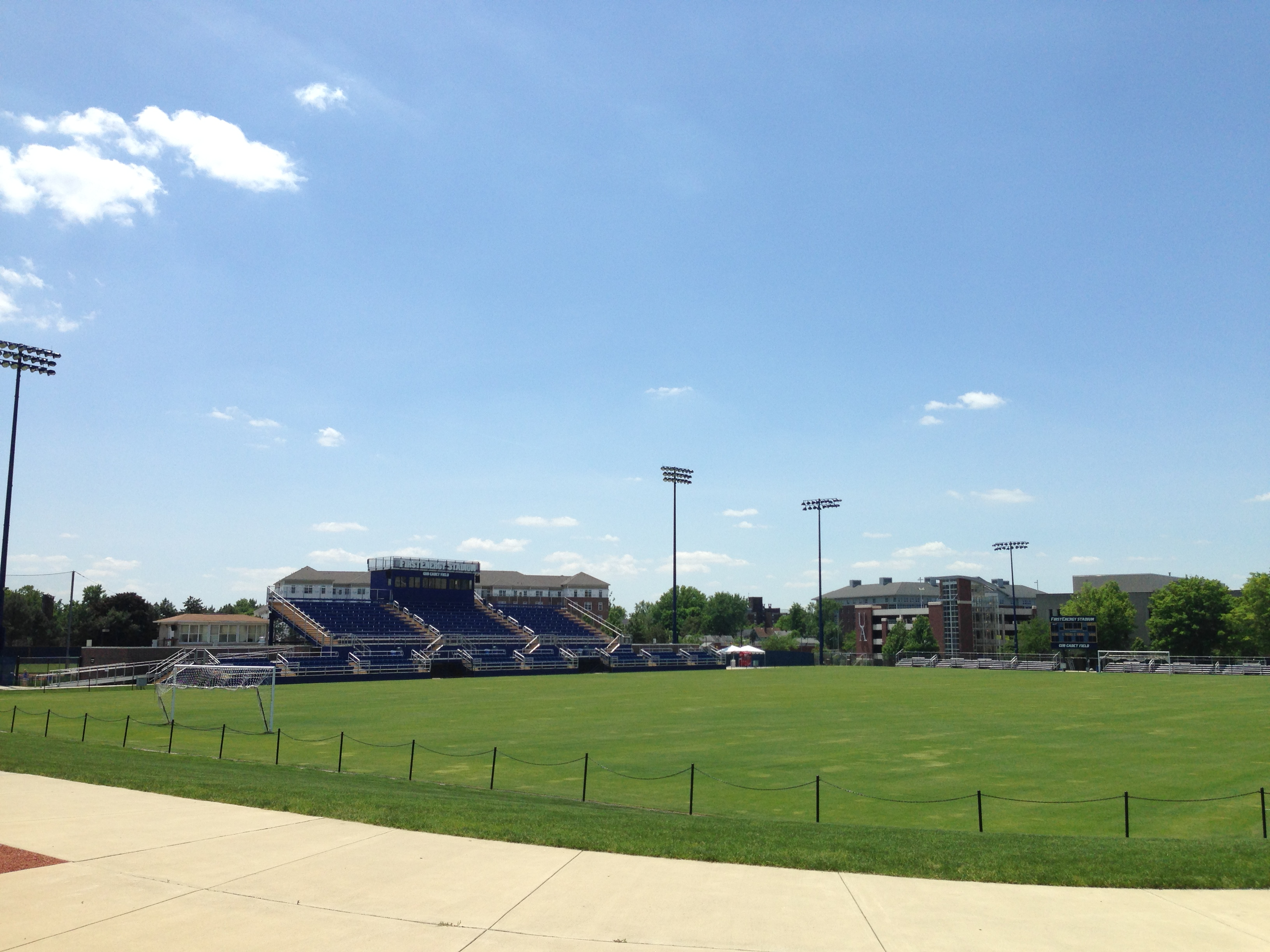
- View of the stadium in 2014
- Interactive map of FirstEnergy Stadium
- Full name: FirstEnergy Stadium–Cub Cadet Field
- Former names: Lee R. Jackson Soccer Field
- Address: Akron, Oh; United States
- Coordinates: 41°4′27.19″N 81°30′40.25″W
- Owner: University of Akron
- Operator: Univ. of Akron Athletics
- Capacity: 5,800
- Type: Soccer-specific stadium
- Surface: Artificial turf
- Record attendance: 5,819 (Akron v Ohio State, 28 Sep 2011)
- Field size: 109 x 70 m

Construction
- Built: 1936
- Opened: 1936; 90 years ago
- Renovated: 1988
- Expanded: 2010

Tenants
- Akron Zips (NCAA) teams: men's soccer (1936–present); women's soccer (2001–present); Professional teams: Akron Summit Assault (PDL) (2011)

Website
- gozips.com/firstenergy-stadium

FirstEnergy Stadium–Cub Cadet Field, formerly known as "Lee R. Jackson Soccer Field", is a soccer-specific stadium on the campus of the University of Akron in Akron, Ohio, United States. It is the home field of the Akron Zips men's and women's soccer teams. The facility is part of the Lee Jackson Field Complex, a 23-acre (9.3 ha) multi-purpose facility which serves the University of Akron's various intercollegiate programs.

Originally dedicated on October 22, 1936, as Lee R. Jackson Field, after the former chairman of the University of Akron Board of Directors and retired president of the Firestone Tire and Rubber Company. Jackson was captain of the 1910 Akron football team and a three-year letterman.

== Modern history ==
In 1988 a fence enclosure and fixture of lights were added to the soccer field, making it one of the first lit playing fields in the Mid-American Conference. The facility is also equipped with a drainage system for the playing surface. In October 2000, a new scoreboard was added, and in the summer of 2005, new bleachers were added to the south end of the facility.

Other improvements included a new field and irrigation system, with new lights and fencing around the stadium which was completed in time for the 2010 soccer season. Fundraising took place for other features of the stadium, which include dugouts and a rest area for each team, a new grandstand, a new multipurpose press box/suite, concessions, public restrooms, and event plaza. On June 15, 2011, The University of Akron announced that the field was officially renamed FirstEnergy Stadium–Cub Cadet Field with naming rights paid by First Energy. Plans were announced to build more bleacher seats, restrooms, and a concession stand.
