= 1995 Wisconsin Badgers men's soccer team =

American college soccer season

1995 Wisconsin Badgers men's soccer

National Champion

Big Ten Tournament co-champion

NCAA Tournament, Final W 2–0 vs. Duke
- Conference: Big Ten Conference
- Record: 20–4–1 (4–1–0 Big Ten)
- Head coach: Jim Launder (14th season)
- Captains: Mike Gentile; Scott Lamphear
- Home stadium: McClimon Complex

1995 Big Ten Conference men's soccer standings
	Conf.					Overall
Team	W		L		T	W		L		T
No. 1 Wisconsin ‡	4	–	1	–	0	20	–	4	–	1
Penn State +	4	–	1	–	0	15	–	5	–	0
No. 22 Indiana +	3	–	2	–	0	14	–	5	–	2
Michigan State	3	–	2	–	0	12	–	3	–	3
Ohio State	1	–	4	–	0	7	–	11	–	1
Northwestern	0	–	5	–	0	4	–	13	–	1
‡ – 1995 Big Ten Tournament champion + – Invited to the 1995 NCAA Division I Men's Soccer Championship; Rankings from United Soccer Coaches

The 1995 Wisconsin Badgers men's soccer team represented the University of Wisconsin–Madison during the 1995 NCAA Division I men's soccer season and the 1995 Big Ten Conference men's soccer season. It was the program's 19th season of existence and their 19th season in NCAA Division I and the Big Ten Conference.

The 1995 season saw the Badgers win their first, and to date, only national championship. Played in front of the second-largest NCAA soccer crowd in history, Wisconsin beat Duke to win the 1995 NCAA Division I Men's Soccer Championship. Additionally, the Badgers were, along with Indiana, co-champions of the 1995 Big Ten Conference Men's Soccer Tournament. Wisconsin would not win the title again until 2017.

On October 13, 1995, the Badgers had their highest crowd in program history. 2,470 people attended their 2–0 win against Indiana.

== Roster ==
Note: Flags indicate national team as defined under FIFA eligibility rules; some limited exceptions apply. Players may hold more than one non-FIFA nationality.

No.	Pos.	Nation	Player
—	GK	USA	Jon Belskis
—	MF	USA	Christian Broadhurst
—	DF	USA	Chad Cole
—	DF	USA	Todd DeAmicis
—	MF	USA	Brian Doherty
—	MF	USA	Mike Gentile
—	FW	USA	Bryan Grimm
—	FW	NOR	Lars Hansen
—	MF	USA	Shea Huston
—	MF	USA	Ryan Kehoe

No.	Pos.	Nation	Player
—	DF	USA	Blaze Konkol
—	DF	USA	Adam Kowalski
—	DF	USA	Scott Lamphear
—	MF	USA	Mike Malen
—	DF	USA	Josh Provan
—	FW	USA	Travis Roy
—	DF	USA	Scott Sporcich
—	DF	USA	Alastair Steel
—	MF	USA	Andrew Steele
—		USA	Doug Watson
—	GK	USA	Todd Wilson

== Schedule ==
Date Time, TV	Rank^{#}	Opponent^{#}	Result	Record	Site City, State
Regular season
September 2*		Holy Cross	W 1–0	1–0–0	McClimon Complex; Madison, WI
September 3*		Georgetown	W 5–0	2–0–0	McClimon Complex; Madison, WI
September 9*		vs. Wake Forest; Panther Classic	W 1–0	3–0–0	Engelmann Field; Milwaukee, WI
September 10*		vs. Miami (OH); Panther Classic	L 0–1	3–1–0	Engelmann Field; Milwaukee, WI
September 15*		at Evansville	W 1–0	4–1–0	Arad McCutchan Stadium; Evansville, IN
September 17*		at South Carolina	W 3–2	5–1–0	Eugene Stone Stadium; Columbia, SC
September 23*		at Creighton	L 1–2	5–2–0	Morrison Stadium; Omaha, NE
September 24*		at Drake	W 1–0	6–2–0	Drake University Stadium; Des Moines, IA
September 29		at Northwestern	W 6–0	7–2–0 (1–0–0)	Ryan Field; Evanston, IL
October 1		Ohio State	W 3–1	8–2–0 (2–0–0)	McClimon Complex; Madison, WI
October 6*		at Northern Illinois	W 3–1	9–2–0	Brigham Field; DeKalb, IL
October 8		at Penn State	W 2–0	10–2–0 (3–0–0)	Jeffrey Field; State College, PA
October 13		Indiana	W 2–0	11–2–0 (4–0–0)	McClimon Complex (2,470); Madison, WI
October 15*		Butler	L 0–1	11–3–0	McClimon Complex; Madison, WI
October 20*		vs. Milwaukee; Governor's Cup	W 1–0	12–3–0	Bavarian Soccer Park; Glendale, WI
October 22*		Marquette	T 1–1 ^{OT}	12–3–1	McClimon Complex; Madison, WI
October 25*		Green Bay; Chancellor's Cup	W 2–0	13–3–1	McClimon Complex; Madison, WI
October 29		Michigan State	L 1–2 ^{OT}	13–4–1 (4–1–0)	McClimon Complex; Madison, WI
November 5*		Notre Dame	W 3–0 ^{OT}	14–4–1	McClimon Complex; Madison, WI
Big Ten Tournament
November 12	(1)	at (4) Michigan State; Semifinals	W 2–0	15–4–1	DeMartin Soccer Complex; East Lansing, MI
November 13	(1)	vs. (3) Indiana; Final (cancelled)		15–4–1	DeMartin Soccer Complex; East Lansing, MI
NCAA Tournament
November 19*		Bowling Green; First Round	W 2–0	16–4–1	McClimon Complex; Madison, WI
November 26*		William & Mary; Second Round	W 1–0 ^{2OT}	17–4–1	McClimon Complex; Madison, WI
December 3*		at (2) SMU; Quarterfinals	W 2–0	18–4–1	Westcott Field; Dallas, TX
December 8*; 1:00 pm		vs. Portland; Semifinals	W 1–0	19–4–1	University of Richmond Stadium (21,319); Richmond, VA
December 10*; 1:00 pm		vs. Duke; National Championship	W 2–0	20–4–1	University of Richmond Stadium (20,703); Richmond, VA
*Non-conference game. ^{#}Rankings from United Soccer Coaches. (#) Tournament seedings in parentheses.

== Honors and awards ==
The following players earned a postseason award.

=== National awards ===
- NSCAA All-Americans
  - Scott Lamphear (First-Team All-American)
  - Mike Gentile (Third-Team All-American)
- NSCAA Coach of the Year Award
  - Jim Launder

=== Regional awards ===
- NSCAA All-Midwest Region
  - Mike Gentile
  - Scott Lamphear
  - Travis Roy
- CoSIDA Academic All Region
  - Scott Lamphear (First-Team)
  - Josh Provan (Second-Team)
  - Alastair Steel (Second-Team)

=== Conference awards ===
- Big Ten Coach of the Year Award
  - Jim Launder
- All-Big Ten First Team
  - Mike Gentile
  - Scott Lamphear
  - Travis Roy
- All-Big Ten Second Team
  - Lars Hansen
  - Josh Provan
  - Alastair Steel
- Big Ten Player of the Week
  - Bryan Grimm, week of Nov. 7, 1995
  - Scott Lamphear, week of Oct. 10, 1995
- Big Ten All-Academic Team
  - Christian Broadhurst
  - Brian Doherty
  - Lars Hansen
  - Shea Huston
  - Ryan Kehoe
  - Blaze Konkol
  - Scott Lamphear
  - Josh Provan
  - Alastair Steel
  - Andrew Steele
- Big Ten Medal of Honor
  - Jeff Gold

=== Team Awards ===
- Team MVP
  - Scott Lamphear
- Outstanding Freshman
  - Doug Watson
- Athletic Board Scholar
  - Ryan Kehoe (Zoology)

== MLS Draft ==
The following members of 1995 Wisconsin Badgers men's soccer team were selected in the 1996 MLS College Draft.

Player	Round	Pick	Position	MLS club	Ref.
Mike Gentile	1	9	MF	Colorado Rapids	
Scott Lamphear	2	11	DF	NY/NJ MetroStars	
