= 2013 Big Ten Conference men's soccer season =

Big Ten Conference
- Season: 2013
- Champions: Indiana
- Premiers: Penn State
- NCAA Tournament: Indiana; Michigan State; Penn State; Wisconsin

2013 Big Ten Conference men's soccer standings
	Conf.					Overall
Team	W		L		T	W		L		T
No. 16 Penn State +	5	–	1	–	0	13	–	6	–	2
No. 19 Wisconsin +	4	–	2	–	0	13	–	5	–	2
No. 7 Michigan State +	3	–	2	–	1	14	–	6	–	3
Michigan	3	–	3	–	0	8	–	7	–	3
Indiana ‡	2	–	4	–	0	8	–	12	–	2
Ohio State	1	–	3	–	2	5	–	8	–	5
Northwestern +	1	–	4	–	1	10	–	8	–	3
‡ - Tournament champion + - Invited to the NCAA Division I Men's Soccer Championship; As of December 17, 2013 (UTC); Rankings from NSCAA

The 2013 Big Ten Conference men's soccer season was the 23rd season of men's varsity soccer in the conference.

The defending regular season champions, Penn State Nittany Lions, successfully defended their title. The Indiana Hoosiers won the 2013 Big Ten Conference Men's Soccer Tournament.

== Changes from 2012 ==
No new teams joined the conference in 2013; however, 2013 was the final season with seven schools competing, as Rutgers and Maryland joined in 2014.

== Preseason ==
Defending national champion Indiana was picked to win the conference ahead of Michigan State.

=== Preseason poll ===
Projected Rank	School	2012 Finish
1	Indiana	T-3rd
2	Michigan State	5th
3	Northwestern	T-1st
4	Michigan	T-3rd
5	Penn State	T-1st
6	Wisconsin	6th
7	Ohio State	7th

== Teams ==
=== Stadia and locations ===
Team	Location	Stadium	Capacity
Indiana Hoosiers	Bloomington, Indiana	Armstrong Stadium	6,000
Michigan Wolverines	Ann Arbor, Michigan	U-M Soccer Stadium	2,200
Michigan State Spartans	East Lansing, Michigan	DeMartin Soccer Complex	2,500
Northwestern Wildcats	Evanston, Illinois	Lakeside Field	2,000
Ohio State Buckeyes	Columbus, Ohio	Owens Memorial Stadium	10,000
Penn State Nittany Lions	State College, Pennsylvania	Jeffrey Field	5,000
Wisconsin Badgers	Madison, Wisconsin	McClimon Stadium	2,000

- Illinois, Iowa, Minnesota, Nebraska and Purdue do not sponsor men's soccer

=== Personnel ===
Team	Head coach	Shirt supplier
Indiana	(United States) Todd Yeagley	(Germany) Adidas
Michigan	(Canada) Chaka Daley	(Germany) Adidas
Michigan State	(United States) Damon Rensing	(United States) Nike
Northwestern	(United States) Tim Lenahan	(United States) Under Armour
Ohio State	(United States) John Bluem	(United States) Nike
Penn State	(United States) Bob Warming	(United States) Nike
Wisconsin	(United States) John Trask	(Germany) Adidas

== Regular season ==
=== Results ===
Home \ Away	IND	MIC	MSU	NOR	OSU	PSU	WIS
Indiana	—	—	2–3	—	2–0	0–2	—
Michigan	2–1	—	—	0–2	—	—	2–1
Michigan State	—	2–0	—	—	1–1	1–2	—
Northwestern	0–3	—	2–3	—	—	—	0–1
Ohio State	—	0–1	—	0–0	—	1–0	—
Penn State	—	3–1	—	2–1	—	—	3–1
Wisconsin	4–3	—	1–0	—	2–0	—	—

Source: Team Statistics
Legend: Blue = home team win; Yellow = draw; Red = away team win.

== Postseason ==
=== Big Ten Tournament ===
Semifinal
1	Penn State	0(3)
5	Indiana	0(5)
7	Northwestern	0
3	Michigan State	1

Final
5	Indiana	1
3	Michigan State	0

=== NCAA Tournament ===
Seed	Region	School	1st Round	2nd Round	3rd Round	Quarterfinals
11	3	Michigan State	BYE	W 1–0 vs. Louisville – (East Lansing)	W, 2–2 vs. Georgetown – (Washington, D.C.)	L, 1–2 vs. Notre Dame – (Notre Dame)
—N/a	1	Indiana	L, 2–3 vs. Akron – (Akron)			
—N/a	2	Northwestern	L, 2–3 vs. Bradley – (Evanston)			
—N/a	3	Wisconsin	W 1–0 vs. Milwaukee – (Madison)	L, 0–4 vs. Notre Dame – (Notre Dame)		

== See also ==
- Big Ten Conference
- 2013 Big Ten Conference Men's Soccer Tournament
- 2013 NCAA Division I men's soccer season
- 2013 in American soccer
