= 2013 Indiana Hoosiers men's soccer team =

Indiana Hoosiers
2013 season
- Head Coach: Todd Yeagley
- Stadium: Bill Armstrong Stadium
- Big Ten: 5th (2–4–0)
- Big Ten Tournament: Champions
- NCAA Tournament: 1st round

2013 Big Ten Conference men's soccer standings
	Conf.					Overall
Team	W		L		T	W		L		T
No. 16 Penn State +	5	–	1	–	0	13	–	6	–	2
No. 19 Wisconsin +	4	–	2	–	0	13	–	5	–	2
No. 7 Michigan State +	3	–	2	–	1	14	–	6	–	3
Michigan	3	–	3	–	0	8	–	7	–	3
Indiana ‡	2	–	4	–	0	8	–	12	–	2
Ohio State	1	–	3	–	2	5	–	8	–	5
Northwestern +	1	–	4	–	1	10	–	8	–	3
‡ - Tournament champion + - Invited to the NCAA Division I Men's Soccer Championship; As of December 17, 2013 (UTC); Rankings from NSCAA

The 2013 Indiana Hoosiers men's soccer team was the college's 41st season playing organized men's college soccer.

== Background ==
In the 2012 regular season Indiana finished 4th in the conference, losing in the Big Ten Tournament to eventual champions Michigan State. Indiana also entered the NCAA Tournament, defeating the Georgetown Hoyas in the 2012 College Cup Final 1–0 and winning the national championship.

== Roster ==
Note: Flags indicate national team as defined under FIFA eligibility rules; some limited exceptions apply. Players may hold more than one non-FIFA nationality.

No.	Pos.	Nation	Player
0	GK	(United States) USA	Kyle Wieschhaus
1	GK	(United States) USA	Michael Soderlund
2	DF	(United States) USA	Billy McConnell
3	DF	(United States) USA	Derek Creviston
4	FW	(United States) USA	Femi Hollinger-Janzen
5	DF	(United States) USA	Matt McKain
6	MF	(United States) USA	Dylan Mares
7	MF	(United States) USA	Harrison Petts
8	MF	(United States) USA	Nikita Kotlov
9	FW	(United States) USA	Andrew Oliver
10	MF	(United States) USA	A. J. Corrado
11	MF	(United States) USA	Tanner Thompson
14	FW	(United States) USA	Tommy Thompson
15	MF	(United States) USA	Jamie Vollmer

No.	Pos.	Nation	Player
16	MF	(United States) USA	Dylan Lax
17	MF	(United States) USA	Jacob Bushue
18	MF	(United States) USA	Richard Ballard
19	DF	(United States) USA	Patrick Doody
20	FW	(United States) USA	Sean Cowdrey
21	FW	(United States) USA	Kyle Sparks
22	MF	(United States) USA	Michael Galullo
23	DF	(United States) USA	Kerel Bradford
25	DF	(United States) USA	Zach Martin
26	DF	(United States) USA	Adam Goldfaden
27	MF	(United States) USA	Brad Shaw
32	GK	(United States) USA	Colin Webb
33	GK	(United States) USA	Sean Weidman

== Competitions ==
=== Preseason ===
August 22	Indiana	3–3	Marquette	Fort Wayne, Indiana
7:00 pm ET		Report		Referee: Donovan Noocha

August 24	Indiana	0–1	North Carolina	Fort Wayne, Indiana
7:00 pm ET		Report		Referee: Prem Kumar

=== Regular season ===
August 30 1	Indiana	2–1	SMU	Bloomington, Indiana
7:30 pm ET		Report		Stadium: Armstrong Stadium; Attendance: 3,142; Referee: Cesar Ibarra

September 1 2	Indiana	0–1	UCLA	Bloomington, Indiana
2:00 pm ET		Report		Stadium: Armstrong Stadium; Attendance: 7,720; Referee: Cien Asoera

September 6 3	UAB	2–1	Indiana	Birmingham, Alabama
8:30 pm ET		Report		Attendance: 3,205; Referee: Peter Dhima

September 8 4	Indiana	4–5	West Virginia	Bloomington, Indiana
8:00 pm ET		Report		Stadium: Armstrong Stadium; Attendance: 1,835; Referee: Abby Okulaja

September 13 5	Indiana	4–1	CSU Bakersfield	Bloomington, Indiana
8:00 pm ET		Report		Stadium: Armstrong Stadium; Attendance: 2,634; Referee: Nikola Alexsic

September 15 6	Indiana	1–1	UC Irvine	Bloomington, Indiana
1:00 pm ET		Report		Stadium: Armstrong Stadium; Attendance: 1,695; Referee: Gregory Dopka Jr.

September 20 7	Indiana	2–1	Brown	Bloomington, Indiana
7:30 pm ET		Report		Stadium: Armstrong Stadium; Attendance: 1,233; Referee: Pawel Wydra

September 25 8	Butler	3–2	Indiana	Indianapolis, Indiana
7:30 pm ET		Report		Stadium: Butler Bowl; Attendance: 5,029; Referee: Khalaf Al-Latayfeh

September 29 9	Indiana	2–0	Ohio State	Bloomington, Indiana
3:00 pm ET		Report		Stadium: Armstrong Stadium; Attendance: 1,385; Referee: Landis Wiley

October 2 10	Notre Dame	2–0	Indiana	Notre Dame, Indiana
7:00 pm ET		Report		Stadium: Alumni Stadium; Attendance: 2,042; Referee: Chico Grajeda

October 6 11	Indiana	0–2	Penn State	Bloomington, Indiana
2:30 pm ET		Report		Stadium: Armstrong Stadium; Attendance: 1,341; Referee: Abby Okulaja

October 11 12	Wisconsin	4–3	Indiana	Madison, Wisconsin
8:00 pm ET		Report		Stadium: McClimon Complex; Attendance: 1,512

October 15 13	Indiana	0–3	Louisville	Bloomington, Indiana
7:00 pm ET		Report		Stadium: Armstrong Stadium; Attendance: 1,434; Referee: Christopher Koloffon

October 18 14	VCU	1–0	Indiana	Richmond, Virginia
7:00 pm ET		Report		Stadium: Sports Backers Stadium; Attendance: 1,247; Referee: Bill Dittmar

October 23 15	Indiana	4–2	Evansville	Bloomington, Indiana
7:00 pm ET		Report		Stadium: Armstrong Stadium; Attendance: 1,353; Referee: Miguel Panduro Jr.

October 26 16	Michigan	2–1	Indiana	Ann Arbor, Michigan
7:00 pm ET		Report		Stadium: U-M Soccer Stadium; Attendance: 1,263; Referee: Edin Jurisevic

November 1 17	Indiana	2–3	Michigan State	Bloomington, Indiana
7:00 pm ET		Report		Stadium: Armstrong Stadium; Attendance: 1,503; Referee: Peter Dhima

November 8 18	Northwestern	0–3	Indiana	Evanston, Illinois
8:00 pm ET		Report		Stadium: Lakeside Field; Attendance: 910; Referee: Jorge Cuate

=== Big Ten Tournament ===
November 13 QF	Michigan	1–2	Indiana	Columbus, Ohio
4:30 pm ET		Report		Stadium: Jesse Owens Memorial Stadium; Referee: Edvin Jurisevic

November 15 SF	Penn State	0–0 (a.e.t.) (3–5 p)	Indiana	Columbus, Ohio
12:00 pm ET		Report		Stadium: Jesse Owens Memorial Stadium; Referee: Jorge Cuate

November 17 F	Michigan State	2–3	Indiana	Columbus, Ohio
11:00 am ET		Report		Stadium: Jesse Owens Memorial Stadium; Referee: Pawel Wydra

=== NCAA Tournament ===
November 21 1st round	Akron	3–2	Indiana	Akron, Ohio
7:00 pm ET		Report		Stadium: FirstEnergy Stadium; Attendance: 1,919; Referee: Chris Penso

== See also ==
- 2013 Big Ten Conference men's soccer season
- 2013 Big Ten Conference Men's Soccer Tournament
- 2013 NCAA Division I Men's Soccer Championship
