= 2013 Big Ten men's soccer tournament =

2013 Big Ten Conference men's soccer tournament
Tournament details
- Country: United States
- Teams: 7

Final positions
- Champions: Indiana
- Runners-up: Michigan State

Tournament statistics
- Matches played: 6
- Goals scored: 10 (1.67 per match)

2013 Big Ten Conference men's soccer standings
| | Conf. | | | | | Overall |
| Team | W | | L | | T | W | | L | | T |
|---|---|---|---|---|---|---|---|---|---|---|
| No. 16 Penn State + | 5 | – | 1 | – | 0 | 13 | – | 6 | – | 2 |
| No. 19 Wisconsin + | 4 | – | 2 | – | 0 | 13 | – | 5 | – | 2 |
| No. 7 Michigan State + | 3 | – | 2 | – | 1 | 14 | – | 6 | – | 3 |
| Michigan | 3 | – | 3 | – | 0 | 8 | – | 7 | – | 3 |
| Indiana ‡ | 2 | – | 4 | – | 0 | 8 | – | 12 | – | 2 |
| Ohio State | 1 | – | 3 | – | 2 | 5 | – | 8 | – | 5 |
| Northwestern + | 1 | – | 4 | – | 1 | 10 | – | 8 | – | 3 |
‡ - Tournament champion + - Invited to the NCAA Division I Men's Soccer Championship; As of December 17, 2013 (UTC); Rankings from NSCAA

The 2013 Big Ten Conference men's soccer tournament was the 23rd postseason tournament to determine the champion of the Big Ten Conference. The defending champion was Michigan State. The tournament was held from November 13–17, 2013.

== Bracket ==
Quarterfinals
4 | Michigan | 1
5 | Indiana | 2
2 | Wisconsin | 1
7 | Northwestern | 2
3 | Michigan State | 2
6 | Ohio State | 0

Semifinals
1 | Penn State | 0(3)
5 | Indiana | 0(5)
7 | Northwestern | 0
3 | Michigan State | 1

Championship
5 | Indiana | 1
3 | Michigan State | 0

== Schedule ==
=== Quarterfinals ===
| November 13 | #3 Michigan State | 2–0 | #6 Ohio State | Columbus, Ohio |
| 14:00 ET | McIntosh 57'; Conerty 69' | Report | | Stadium: Jesse Owens Memorial Stadium; Referee: Peter Dhima |

| November 13 | #4 Michigan | 1–2 (a.e.t.) | #5 Indiana | Columbus, Ohio |
| 16:30 ET | Harris 11' | Report | Corrado 63'; Mares 95' | Stadium: Jesse Owens Memorial Stadium; Referee: Edvin Jurisevic |

| November 13 | #2 Wisconsin | 1–2 | #7 Northwestern | Columbus, Ohio |
| 19:00 ET | Schneider 59' | Report | Wilson 31'; Weberman 37' | Stadium: Jesse Owens Memorial Stadium; Referee: Dimitar Chavdarov |

=== Semifinals ===
| November 15 | #1 Penn State | 0–0 (a.e.t.) (3–5 p) | #5 Indiana | Columbus, Ohio |
| 12:00 ET | | Report | | Stadium: Jesse Owens Memorial Stadium; Attendance: 218; Referee: Jorge Cuate |
| | Penalties |
| | Seiler (penalty missed); Griffith (penalty scored); Tyler (penalty scored); Campbell (penalty scored) | | (penalty scored) Kotlov; (penalty scored) Hollinger-Janzen; (penalty scored) Thompson; (penalty scored) Bushue; (penalty scored) Sparks |

| November 15 | #3 Michigan State | 1–0 | #7 Northwestern | Columbus, Ohio |
| 14:30 ET | Alashe 25' | Report | | Stadium: Jesse Owens Memorial Stadium; Attendance: 218; Referee: Abbey Okulaja |

=== Final ===
| November 17 | #3 Michigan State | 0–1 | #5 Indiana | Columbus, Ohio |
| 14:00 ET | | Report | Vollmer 66' | Stadium: Jesse Owens Memorial Stadium; Referee: Pawel Wydra |

== See also ==
- Big Ten Conference Men's Soccer Tournament
- 2013 Big Ten Conference men's soccer season
- 2013 NCAA Division I men's soccer season
- 2013 NCAA Division I Men's Soccer Championship
