= Jim Launder =

American soccer coach (born 1952)

Personal information
- Date of birth: March 22, 1952 (age 74)
- Place of birth: Milwaukee, Wisconsin
- Positions: Midfielder; goalkeeper

College career
| Years | Team | Apps | (Gls) |
| 1973 | Milwaukee Panthers | | |

Managerial career
- 1974–1978: Milwaukee Panthers (assistant)
- 1979–1981: Wisconsin Badgers (assistant)
- 1982–1996: Wisconsin Badgers
- 1997–1999: Dayton Flyers
- 2000–2002: Milwaukee Rampage (assistant)
- 2003: Columbus Crew (assistant)
- 2005–: Madison 56ers
- 2020–: Forward Madison FC (assistant)

Jim Launder is an American soccer coach. He was a two-time Big Ten Coach of the Year and the 1995 NSCAA Coach of the Year.

== Career ==
He attended Custer High School in Milwaukee. He then played midfielder and goalkeeper for the Milwaukee Panthers men's soccer team. He was inducted into the Milwaukee Panthers Hall of Fame in 2000.

After serving as an assistant coach, Launder was hired as the head coach at Wisconsin for the 1982 season. He led Wisconsin to the 1995 national championship, and was named the NSCAA Coach of the Year. However, in January 1996, Wisconsin associate athletic director Cheryl Marra recommended to the Athletic Board that Launder's contract not be renewed. UW renewed his contract for one year. Launder was fired from Wisconsin in February 1997. The firing of Launder led to a review of the process Wisconsin used to evaluate coaches.

Launder coached Dayton from 1997 to 1999, leading the team to Atlantic 10 Men's Soccer Tournament championships in 1997 and 1998.

In January 2003, Launder was hired to be an assistant coach for the Columbus Crew. In late 2003, he returned to Madison to become the director of the Princeton Soccer Club.

Launder has coached the Madison 56ers since 2005.

In January 2010, after Wisconsin coach Todd Yeagley departed to become the coach at Indiana, Launder applied to return as Wisconsin men's soccer coach, but was ultimately passed over for John Trask.

Forward Madison FC hired Launder as an assistant coach before the 2020 season.

== College head coaching record ==
Record table
| Season | Team | Overall | Conference | Standing | Postseason |
|---|---|---|---|---|---|
Wisconsin Badgers (Big Ten) (1982–1996)
| 1982 | Wisconsin | 10–6–2 | | | |
| 1983 | Wisconsin | 11–5–4 | | | |
| 1984 | Wisconsin | 12–6–2 | | | |
| 1985 | Wisconsin | 12–7–1 | | | |
| 1986 | Wisconsin | 13–6–1 | | | |
| 1987 | Wisconsin | 13–8–1 | | | |
| 1988 | Wisconsin | 12–4–4 | | | |
| 1989 | Wisconsin | 13–2–3 | | | |
| 1990 | Wisconsin | 8–8–4 | | | |
| 1991 | Wisconsin | 17–4–1 | 5–0–0 | 1st | NCAA Round of 16 |
| 1992 | Wisconsin | 12–5–2 | 4–0–1 | 1st | |
| 1993 | Wisconsin | 15–4–4 | 3–1–1 | 2nd | NCAA Quarterfinals |
| 1994 | Wisconsin | 14–6–0 | 2–3–0 | T–3rd | NCAA First Round |
| 1995 | Wisconsin | 20–4–1 | 4–1–0 | T–1st | NCAA Championship |
| 1996 | Wisconsin | 11–5–5 | 2–2–1 | T–3rd | |
| Wisconsin: | | 193–80–35 (.683) | | | |
Dayton (Atlantic 10) (1997–1999)
| 1997 | Dayton | 12–8–1 | 7–4–0 | T–3rd | NCAA play-in game |
| 1998 | Dayton | 13–9–0 | 9–2–0 | 1st | NCAA play-in game |
| 1999 | Dayton | 9–7–2 | 5–5–1 | 6th | |
| Dayton: | | 34–24–3 (.582) | | | |
| Total: | | 227–104–38 (.667) | | | |
National champion Postseason invitational champion Conference regular season champion Conference regular season and conference tournament champion Division regular season champion Division regular season and conference tournament champion Conference tournament champion
