= 1999 Indiana Hoosiers men's soccer team =

American college soccer team

1999 Indiana Hoosiers men's soccer
- Founded: 1973
- University: Indiana University Bloomington
- Head coach: Jerry Yeagley (27th season)
- Conference: Big Ten
- Location: Bloomington, Indiana, US
- Stadium: Bill Armstrong Stadium (capacity: 6,500)
- Nickname: Indiana Hoosiers
- Colors: Crimson and cream
Home	Away

NCAA tournament championships
- 1999

Conference tournament championships
- 1999

Conference regular season championships
- 1999

The 1999 Indiana Hoosiers men's soccer team represented Indiana University during the 1999 NCAA Division I soccer season, winning the Big Ten Conference regular season and tournament championships and the NCAA Championship. The team was coached by Jerry Yeagley and finished with a record of 21–3. The 1999 Hoosiers were led on offense by Aleksey Korol, Matt Fundenberger, and Yuri Lavrinenko. The defense was led by Nick Garcia, Dennis Fadeski, and T.J. Hannig. The Hoosiers played their home matches at Bill Armstrong Stadium, in Bloomington, Indiana.

The team's penultimate victory of the season came in the semifinals of the 1999 NCAA Soccer Tournament- also known as the College Cup. The Hoosiers defeated their rival, the UCLA Bruins, by a score of 3–2 in 4 overtimes. The match is considered one of the most exciting in college soccer history. Two days later, Indiana defeated Santa Clara University, 1–0 to capture the national championship.

The national championship was the second consecutive championship for the Hoosiers, as they won the 1998 NCAA tournament, and it was the program's fifth overall national championship. The Big Ten title that the Hoosiers captured in 1999 was the sixth consecutive conference championship for the program and was the eighth Big Ten Conference title for Indiana in the nine years that the Big Ten had hosted men's soccer.

== Pre-season ==
The Hoosiers entered 1999 as the defending national champions and ranked #1 in the NSCAA poll. However, early on the team felt the loss of Dema Kovalenko, Lazo Alavanja, and Gino DiGuardi from the 1998 championship team and struggled to find their form. The Hoosiers struggled in the preseason exhibition schedule, losing 2–3 to St. Louis, squeaking past IUPUI 1–0, and then drawing with Clemson 1-1.

== Regular season ==
The early struggles continued into the early stages of the season, as the Hoosiers' quest to defending the crown that they'd won in 1998 began slowly. Aleksey Korol's goal lifted Indiana to a 1–0 season-opening win over fellow 1998 College Cup participant, Maryland, in front of 4,726 fans at Bill Armstrong Stadium. Indiana then dropped a 0-1 decision to St. Louis at home and fell to Yale on the road, 1–2.

The 1–2 record to start the season was a disappointment, but the Hoosiers responded and wouldn't lose again until the final regular season game of the year, stringing together 13 straight wins. The streak began with wins over Brown, Fresno State, TCU, Louisville and Michigan State.

Penn State then visited Bloomington as the #1 ranked team in the nation. And in a match, the Hoosiers prevailed 4–2. Pat Noonan, Fundenberger, Korol and Lavrinenko each found the net in the match, and the matchup proved to be the first of three meetings between the squads in 1999. The win ran the Hoosiers record to 7–2–0.

Indiana's next 4 games against Butler, Evansville, Wisconsin and Northwestern were all shutout wins for the Hoosiers. IU then topped Kentucky and beat Ohio State to clinch the Regular Season Big Ten Championship with a 5–0 conference record. Indiana defeated Florida International for the Hoosiers' 13th straight win, and then dropped the final game of the regular season to James Madison. IU closed the regular season with a record of 14–3–0.

== Big Ten Tournament ==
A first round bye awaited the team in the Big Ten tournament in East Lansing, Michigan. In the semifinals, Indiana defeated Northwestern, 2-0 to set up a matchup with familiar foe Penn State, for the Big Ten championship. In the final, the Nittany Lions gained a 1-goal advantage, but the Hoosiers battled back to force overtime on a goal by Korol. In the second overtime period, Korol netted the golden-goal that won the Big Ten Championship for the Hoosiers. It was Indiana's sixth straight Big Ten Championship and the win extended the Hoosiers' undefeated streak against Big Ten opponents – that began in October, 1995 – to 32 games (30–0–2).

== NCAA Tournament: Rounds 1-3 ==
The opening round match would pit the #2 seeded Hoosiers against Kentucky at Bill Armstrong Stadium, and the match was tense throughout. Despite controlling the play, Indiana could not score in regulation or the first overtime period. But for the second straight game, Korol was the hero in the second overtime and his goal gave Indiana a 1–0 victory and a trip to the second round.

In the Round of 16, the Hoosiers shutout Washington, 2–0 at home with goals from Korol and Mack. With a berth to the College Cup- soccer's version of the Final Four- on the line, the Hoosiers once again hosted Penn State. It was the third meeting between the teams in 1999, but it proved to be the most comfortable margin of victory for Indiana, as the Hoosiers prevailed 3–0. Pat Noonan opened the scoring, and Korol once again was unstoppable and scored 2 goals. The match was the fifth straight in which Korol had scored and the eighth time in nine games. And the win propelled Indiana to its 13th trip to the College Cup in the program's history.

== College Cup ==
The Hoosiers were joined in the 1999 men's soccer College Cup by their long-time rival and semifinal opponent, UCLA, as well as Connecticut and Santa Clara. The UCLA Bruins had stunned Indiana in exactly the same stage of the 1997 College Cup in overtime, when the Hoosiers were 23–0 and bidding for an undefeated season. And just as 1997 provided a classic game, the 1999 matchup was even more dramatic. Two second-half goals by Noonan and Lavrinenko staked the Hoosiers to a seemingly comfortable 2–0 lead, but the Bruins came storming back to tie the match. The Hoosiers surrendered their first goal of the NCAA tournament with 14 minutes left in the match, which cut their lead in half. The Bruins then knotted the match at 2–2 with 8 minutes remaining. The teams battled through the first three overtime periods, with UCLA having the better of the chances. The Bruins nearly ended the match in the third overtime when a header bounced off the post and out of the Hoosiers' goal. In the 142nd minute, and just 8 minutes from a penalty shootout, the Hoosiers finally broke through on a goal by Ryan Mack. Mack's left footed blast from the top of the 18-yard box ended the game and sent the Hoosiers to their tenth NCAA Championship match.

A fatigued Indiana squad faced off against Santa Clara, who also needed four overtimes in their semifinal match to defeat Connecticut, for the 1999 NCAA Championship. The early play between the two exhausted teams was slow and sloppy, but the Hoosiers began to gain control of the match midway through the first half and tallied the first goal in the 30th minute off of a quick counter-attack. Noonan stripped a Santa Clara attacker in Indiana's 18-yard box, and he then passed to Ryan Mack. Mack carried the ball into open space before passing off to Lavrinenko at the midfield stripe. Lavrinenko dribbled through the Santa Clara midfield before passing the ball to Korol at the top of the Santa Clara box. With his back to the goal, Korol held the ball and drew several defenders. As Lavrinenko made a run off of the ball, Korol laid the ball off to the left side to the streaking Lavrinenko. Lavrinenko found himself in on goal from a bit of an angle, but was able to slide the ball underneath the onrushing Santa Clara goalkeeper for a 1–0 lead. Santa Clara nearly equalized in the 39th minute, but Hoosiers goalkeeper TJ Hannig charged out of his goal and stopped a blast from 8 yards out. The save, however, deflected high into the air and was heading towards the open net, before defender John Swann leapt up and headed the ball over the crossbar. The second half saw Santa Clara begin to seize control of the play and put more pressure on the Indiana goal.

In the 70th minute, Indiana defender Nick Garcia made a play that will go down in College Cup lore. After a long throw-in by Santa Clara deep in Indiana's territory was flick-headed in the box, the ball fell perfectly for a Santa Clara attacker, who side-volleyed the ball towards goal. Hannig dove to save, but the ball got past him and was headed for the open net. Seemingly out of nowhere, Garcia dove back into the goalmouth and got enough of his head on the ball to deflect the shot up and off of the crossbar to keep it out of the net. The close calls did not end there for the Hoosiers, as a Santa Clara attacker found himself wide open about 10 yards in front of the Indiana goal following a corner kick in the 73rd minute. But luckily for Indiana, the attacker sent his attempt wide of the net. From that moment on, Indiana clamped down defensively and closed out the 1–0 win for the 1999 National Championship. It was the fifth title in the program's history (along with 1982, '83, '88, '98) and the second time the Hoosiers had gone back-to-back.

== Roster ==
Note: Flags indicate national team as defined under FIFA eligibility rules; some limited exceptions apply. Players may hold more than one non-FIFA nationality.

No.	Pos.	Nation	Player
00	GK	USA	Doug Warren
1	GK	USA	TJ Hannig
3	DF	USA	Nick Garcia
4	DF	USA	John Swann
5	MF	UKR	Yuri Lavrinenko
6	DF	USA	Ryan Hammer
7	MF	USA	Phil Presser
9	DF	USA	Dennis Fadeski
10	MF	USA	Ryan Mack
11	MF	USA	Pat Noonan
13	FW	UKR	Aleksey Korol
14	MF	USA	Justin Tauber
15	MF	USA	Marcus Chorvat

No.	Pos.	Nation	Player
16	FW	USA	Michael Bock
17	MF	USA	Tyler Hawley
18	FW	USA	Matt Fundenberger
19	DF	USA	Brandon Tauber
21	MF	USA	BJ Snow
23	GK	USA	Colin Rogers
33	GK	USA	Matt Reiswerg
—	MF	USA	Nick Donaldson
—	DF	USA	Nick McDevitt
—	MF	USA	David Prall
—	MF	USA	Drew Shinabarger
—	MF	USA	Justen Spirk
—	MF	USA	Cal Thomas

Head Coach: Jerry Yeagley

Assistant Coach: Mike Freitag

Assistant Coach: John Trask

Assistant Coach: Ernie Yarborough

== Stats ==
Aleksey Korol finished the 1999 soccer season with 20 goals and 10 assists for a total of 50 points. He became the first Hoosiers soccer player to tally 50 points in a single season in a decade. His 1999 season put him at fourth on the all-time scoring list for Indiana Soccer, with 149 points. Matt Fundenberger was second on the team in 1999 with 30 points on 10 goals and 10 assists. Yuri Lavrinenko led the squad with 12 assists and added 7 goals, for a total of 26 points. His 12 assists pushed Lavrinenko to second on Indiana's all time assist leaders, with 41 career assists. Ryan Mack added 19 points (5 goals, 9 assists), and Pat Noonan scored 18 points (7 goals, 4 assists) on the season.

On defense, Dennis Fadeski started all 24 matches at marking back, while Nick Garcia started each match at sweeper. The duo anchored the defense to 15 shutouts. Justin Tauber took over the defensive midfielder position for the 1999 season and started 22 matches.

In goal, TJ Hannig and Doug Warren split games throughout the regular season, before Hannig won the job permanently for the entire postseason. Hannig started 16 matches and posted a 14–2 record, with a 0.52 goals against average and 10.5 shutouts. Warren started 8 matches, posting a 7–1 record, with a 0.63 record and 4 shutouts.

== Awards and honors ==
Aleksey Korol was named the Big Ten Conference Player of the Year in 1999, as well as a NSCAA 1st Team All American, and the 1999 SoccerAmerica National Player of the Year. He was also named to the Soccer America All-Decade Team for the 1990s. Korol was a finalist for the 1999 Hermann Trophy- given to the nation's top player, and finished fourth in the voting.

Nick Garcia finished second in the Hermann Trophy voting and was named the 1999 College Cup Most Outstanding Defensive Player. He was also named as a NSCAA 1st Team All American.

Yuri Lavrinenko was named the 1999 College Cup Most Outstanding Offensive Player and was a 2nd Team All American.

Head Coach Jerry Yeagley was named Big Ten Coach of the Year for the fifth time, and also won his fifth NSCAA National Coach of the Year award.

== Hoosiers in the Pros ==
The 1999 Hoosiers saw 3 players drafted in the 2000 MLS SuperDraft. Garcia was selected second overall by the Kansas City Wizards and Korol was drafted fifth overall by the Dallas Burn. The Chicago Fire selected Lavrinenko in the third round, with the 32nd pick overall.

In addition, nine other players from the 1999 National Champions would later go on to play professional soccer either in Major League Soccer or USL A-League (now known as USL First Division): Doug Warren, TJ Hannig, John Swann, Phil Presser, Dennis Fadeski, Ryan Mack, Pat Noonan, Matt Fundenberger, Matt Reiswerg.
