= Matt Reiswerg =

American soccer player and coach

Personal information
- Full name: Matthew Reiswerg
- Date of birth: July 3, 1980 (age 46)
- Place of birth: Indianapolis, Indiana, U.S.
- Height: 6 ft 2 in (1.88 m)
- Position: Goalkeeper

College career
Years	Team	Apps	(Gls)
1999–2002	Indiana Hoosiers		

Senior career*
Years	Team	Apps	(Gls)
2003	Cincinnati Riverhawks	6	(0)
2003	Indiana Blast	2	(0)

Managerial career
- 2006–2010: IUPUI Jaguars (Assistant)
- 2012: Haiti Women's National Team (Goalkeeper Coach)
- 2012–2014: United Soccer Alliance of Indiana (Director)
- 2015–: United States Soccer Federation (Administration)
- * Club domestic league appearances and goals as of April 28, 2007

Matt Reiswerg
Medal record

Representing United States

Football

Maccabiah Games
Silver medal – second place	2005 Maccabiah	Football

Matt Reiswerg (born July 3, 1980) is an American former soccer player and coach. Currently, he works for the United States Soccer Federation. He played soccer at Indiana University. He played professionally for the Cincinnati Riverhawks and the Indiana Blast. He won a silver medal with Team USA at the 2005 Maccabiah Games in Israel.

== Early life ==
Reiswerg is a native of Indianapolis, Indiana, and attended North Central High School. His grandfather was Rube Reiswerg, a professional basketball player in the National Basketball League during the 1930s.

== Career ==
=== College ===
Reiswerg attended Indiana University (Psychology; 2002), where he was a goalkeeper on the Hoosiers soccer team from 1999 to 2002. He was a member of Indiana University's 1999 NCAA National Championship team, as well as a part of three IU squads that advanced to the College Cup Final Four. Additionally, the Hoosiers captured four Big Ten regular season titles, and two Big Ten Tournament championships during his playing career. Reiswerg was a 4-time Alpha Beta Academic Award honoree during his career.

=== Professional ===
In April 2003, Reiswerg signed a professional contract with the Cincinnati Riverhawks of the USL A-League. Reiswerg appeared in six games that season for the Riverhawks, starting five. He made his professional debut for Cincinnati on May 2, 2003, when he came on as a substitute in the Riverhawks' 3–0 victory over the Indiana Blast. In his first professional start, Reiswerg recorded 12 saves in a 3–0 shutout victory over the El Paso Patriots on May 10. For his efforts, Reiswerg was named to the USL A-League Team of the Week. Reiswerg won his second start against the Blast, 2–1, in his home city of Indianapolis, on May 16. Reiswerg also started the Riverhawks' 2nd round U.S. Open Cup match against the Minnesota Thunder, a 2–1 overtime defeat.

In July 2003, Reiswerg left the Riverhawks and signed with his hometown Indiana Blast. He started two matches for the Blast in 2003, including the Blast's final match as an A-League professional franchise

=== International ===
Reiswerg represented the United States as the starting goalkeeper for three international Maccabiah competitions, culminating in the 2005 Maccabiah Games in Israel. At the 2005 games, Reiswerg recorded shutouts in 3 of his first 4 games, which included a penalty shootout victory over Mexico in the semifinals following a 0–0 draw. After blanking Mexico for 120 minutes, Reiswerg saved a potentially game-winning penalty kick on Mexico's 5th spot-kick. Then in sudden-death penalties, he again made a save and then watched his team convert their attempt to seal the victory. The dramatic win advanced the Americans to the tournament final vs. Israel. The United States team lost 2–0 to Israel's U-20 National Team in the final, and won the silver medal.

=== Coaching and administration ===
Reiswerg was an assistant coach for the IUPUI Jaguars men's soccer team from 2006 to 2010. His primary duty was training the goalkeepers. The Jaguars advanced to the Summit League tournament in each of his five seasons at IUPUI, and were finalists in 2007. Under Reiswerg's watch in 2009, the team's goalkeepers posted the lowest team goals against average, and highest save percentage since IUPUI's NCAA Tournament team in 2000. In 2010, the Jaguars keepers bested their 2009 goals against average, recording a combined 1.06 GAA.

In 2012 Reiswerg assisted Coach Shek Borkowski on the staff of the Haitian Women's National Team, and oversaw the training of the goalkeepers during their residency in Lafayette, Indiana. He was on the bench for Haiti's international friendly against Australia on Sept 13, 2012. In November 2012, Reiswerg was hired as the Director of Operations and Marketing for the United Soccer Alliance of Indiana, the state's largest youth soccer organization.

Reiswerg was hired by U.S. Soccer in March 2015, and has worked in the areas of player development and soccer growth.

== Honors ==
=== Indiana University ===
- NCAA Men's Division I Soccer Championship (1): 1999 NCAA National Champions

=== A-League ===
- USL A-League Team of the Week (1): 2003, Week 5

=== Maccabiah Games ===
- 2005 Maccabiah Games (1): silver medal
