= Josh Provan =

American soccer player

Personal information
- Full name: Joshua Provan
- Date of birth: August 4, 1975 (age 51)
- Place of birth: Cudahy, Wisconsin, U.S.
- Height: 5 ft 9 in (1.75 m)
- Position: Defender

Youth career
- 1993–1996: Wisconsin Badgers

Senior career*
Years	Team	Apps	(Gls)
1997–1998	Rockford Raptors		
1999–2001	Milwaukee Rampage	55	(1)
- * Club domestic league appearances and goals

Josh Provan is an American retired soccer defender who played professionally in the USL A-League.

Provan graduated from Cudahy High School. He attended the University of Wisconsin–Madison where he was a 1996 Third Team All American soccer player. In 1997, Provan signed with the Rockford Raptors of the USISL Pro League. In 1999, he moved to the Milwaukee Rampage of the USL A-League. He played for the Rampage until 2001.
