= Bethany Lutheran College =

Private Lutheran college in Mankato, Minnesota, US

- Former name: Bethany Ladies College (1911–1927)
- Motto: ΕΝΟΣ ΕΣΤΙΝ ΧΡΕΙΑ
- Motto in English: One Thing Needful
- Type: Private liberal arts college
- Established: 1927; 99 years ago
- Religious affiliation: Evangelical Lutheran Synod
- Endowment: $41.6 million (2020)
- President: Gene Pfeifer
- Faculty: 75 (35 adjunct)
- Students: 750 undergraduate
- Location: Mankato, Minnesota, United States; 44°09′59″N 93°59′27″W
- Campus: Medium city, 50 acres (20 ha)
- Colors: Red and white (athletics also uses black)
- Sporting affiliations: NCAA Division III – UMAC
- Mascot: Viking
- Website: blc.edu
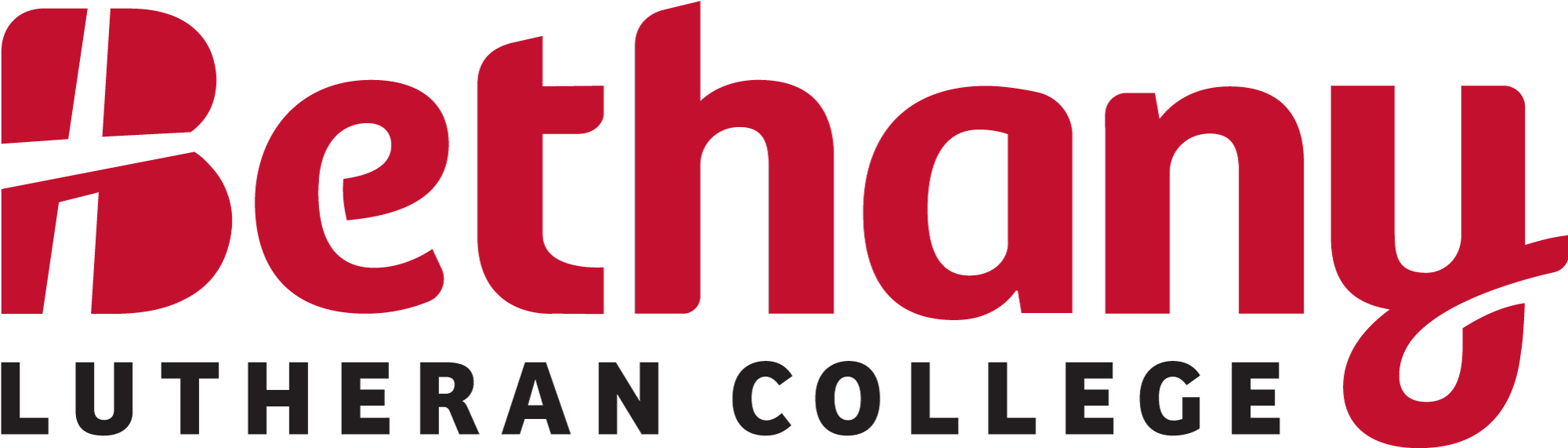

Bethany Lutheran College (BLC) is a private Christian liberal arts college in Mankato, Minnesota, United States. Founded in 1927, BLC is operated by the Evangelical Lutheran Synod. The campus overlooks the Minnesota River valley in a community of 53,000.

== History ==
Bethany Ladies College opened in 1911 with 44 students and a faculty of four. In 1927, the Evangelical Lutheran Synod (then known as the Norwegian Synod of the American Evangelical Lutheran Church) purchased the campus for dual use as both a high school (Bethany Lutheran High School; closed in 1969) and junior college (Bethany Lutheran College). In 1946, Bethany Lutheran Theological Seminary (BLTS) began as a department of the college, becoming a separate institution in 1975. The high school closed in 1969.

In 2001, Bethany awarded its first Bachelor of Arts degrees. This was followed by nursing baccalaureate degrees in 2019.

=== Presidents ===
- Holden Olsen (1927–1929)
- Walter E. Buszin (interim) (1929–1930)
- Sigurd Christian Ylvisaker (1930–1950)
- Bjarne Wollan Teigen (1950–1970)
- Raymond Branstad (1970–1977)
- Theodore A. Aaberg (1977–1978)
- Norman Holte (1978–1982)
- Marvin G. Meyer (1982–2002)
- Dan R. Bruss (2003–2015)
- Gene Pfeifer (2015–present)

== Leadership ==
Bethany Lutheran College is governed by a 12-member Board of Regents. The college's president serves as an advisory member on that board.

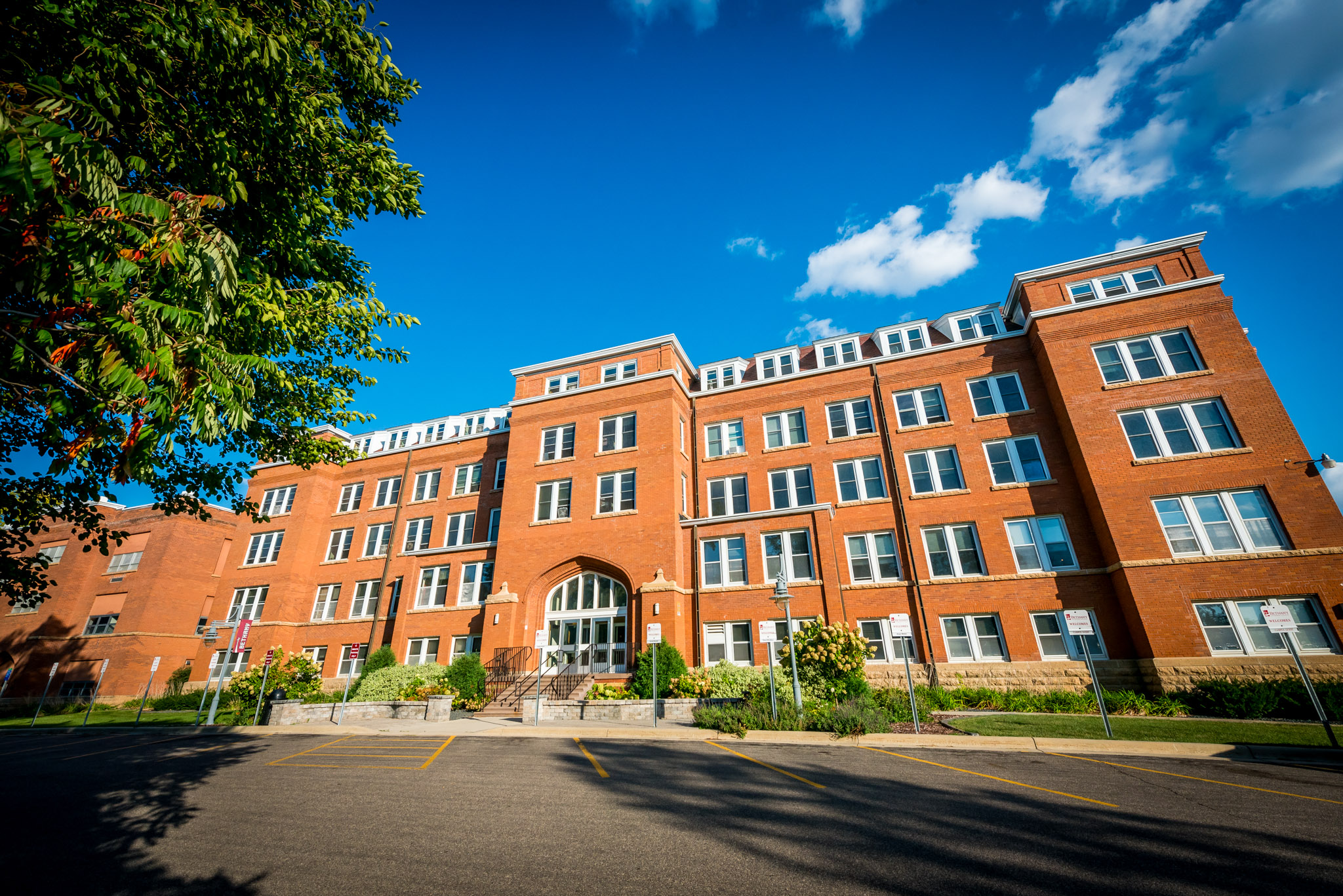
Old Main, built in 1911

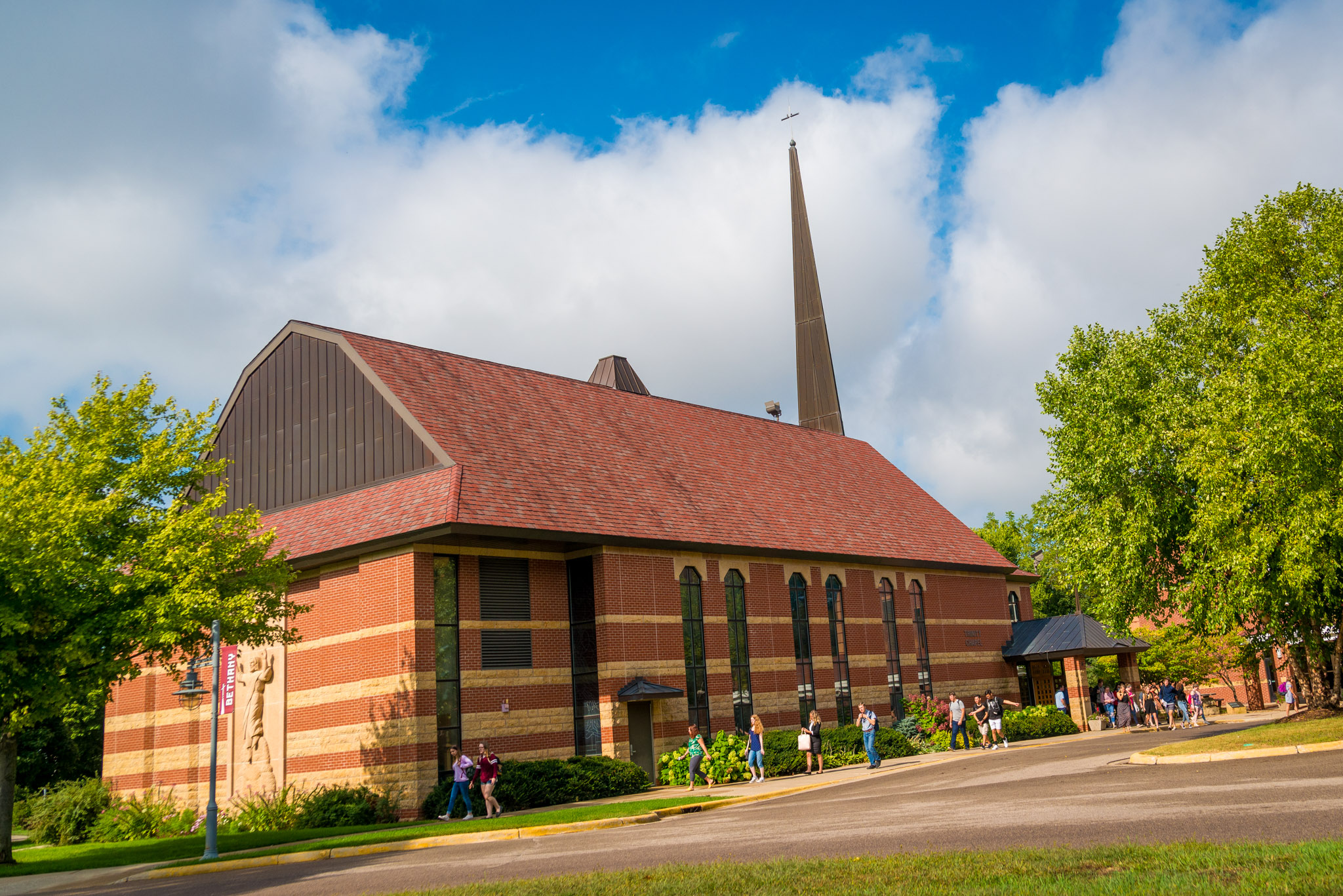
Trinity Chapel

== Academics ==
As of 2024, the college will offer 30 majors, 22 minors, a paralegal certification, and 7 pre-professional programs. All of its undergraduate programs culminate in a Bachelor of Arts degree, except for the nursing program, which leads to a Bachelor of Science in Nursing. In 2021, BLC begin offering a graduate program in Clinical Mental Health Counseling. According to the college, graduates of this 60 credit program "are eligible to become National Certified Counselors, Licensed Professional Counselors (LPC), and Licensed Professional Clinical Counselors (LPCC)"..

=== Accreditation ===
Bethany Lutheran College has been accredited by the Higher Learning Commission since 1974. Its nursing program has been accredited by the Commission on Collegiate Nursing Education since 2018. BLC's education licensure programs are approved by the Minnesota Professional Educator Licensing and Standards Board (PELSB).

The Clinical Mental Health Counseling program received accreditation from the Council for Accreditation of Counseling and Related Educational Programs (CACREP) in 2026. Students who obtained their degree after August 4, 2024 are considered accredited graduates per CACREP. However, graduates are still required to complete additional licensure requirements in order to become Licensed Professional Counselors (LPC) or Licensed Professional Clinical Counselors (LPCC).

== Campus ==
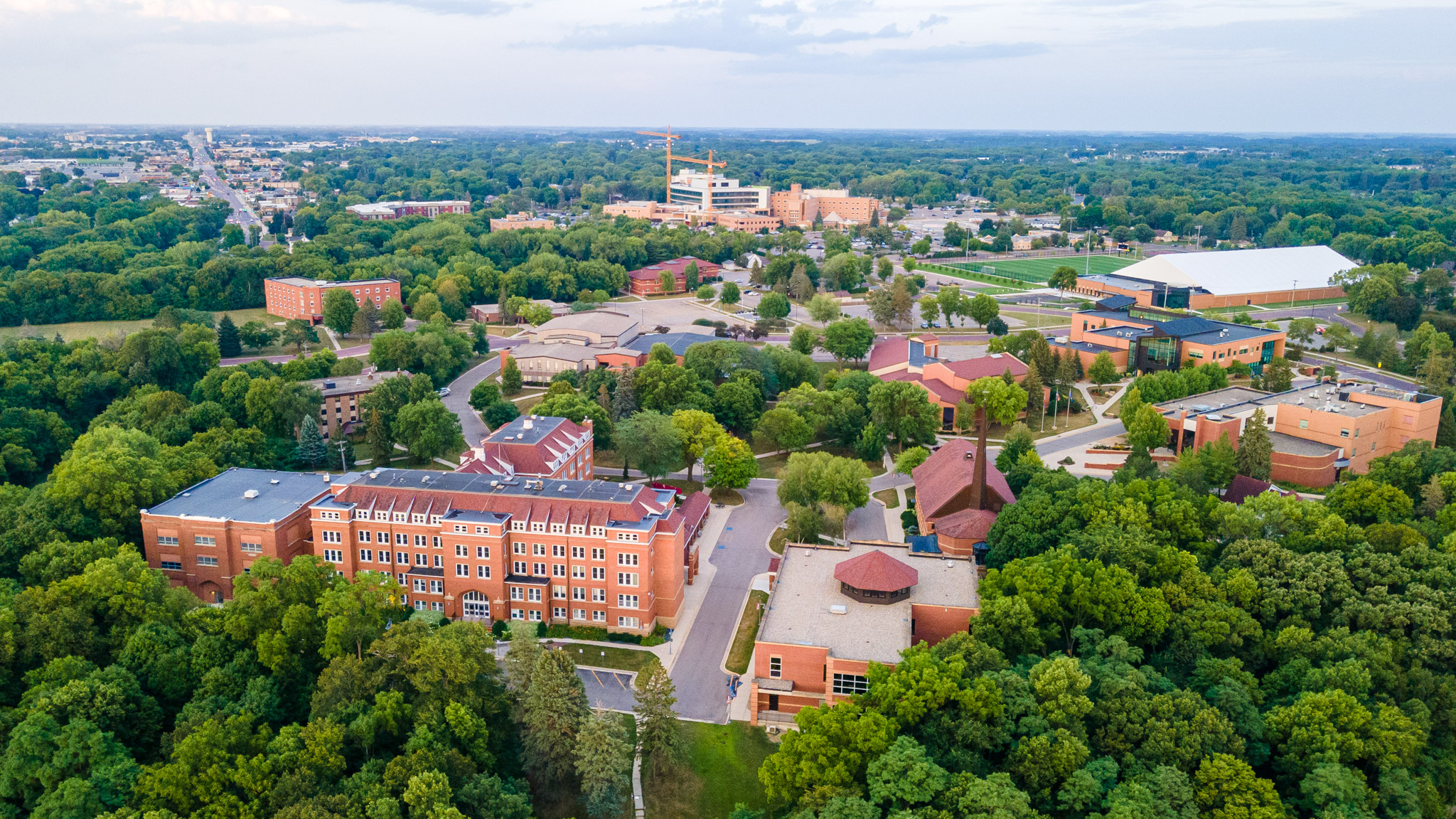
Aerial view of campus

Bethany Lutheran College is made up of 15 buildings. Classes are held primarily in five buildings: Meyer Hall, Honsey Hall, Tweit Hall, the Sports and Fitness Center, and the Ylvisaker Fine Arts Center. Many student services are housed in Old Main, including the cafeteria. There are four stand-alone residence halls, and the top three floors of Old Main house an additional residence hall (Anderson Hall). In addition, the campus houses a library, a chapel, the Bethany Activity Center and an advancement building.

== Residential life ==
Full-time students are required to live on-campus for their first academic year, unless they are living with parents nearby, are married or have children, or are over 20-years old. Sixty-five percent of all students live on campus.

Bethany Lutheran College's residence halls are separated by gender, with two halls for women and three for men. Visitors are only allowed to visit halls housing opposite-gender students during specific visitation hours. All residence halls include student lounges (including kitchens in non-apartment halls) and free laundry facilities. All residence halls are staffed by residence hall coordinators who live in the residence halls, oversee student resident assistants, and provide student support.

Anderson Hall houses freshman through seniors and consists of a variety of dorm room layouts housing one to four students. Edgewood Place houses primarily upper-classmen women and consists of 16 two- and three-bedroom apartments, housing three to six students each. These apartments include full kitchens.

Teigan Hall and Gullixson Hall house freshmen through senior men and consist primarily of single and double rooms. Gullixson Hall also includes six one-bedroom apartments which house two upper-classmen students each. Larson Hall consists of five three-bedroom apartments which house up to six upper-classmen men. Larson Hall apartments have full kitchens that include microwaves.

== Student life ==
=== Fine arts ===
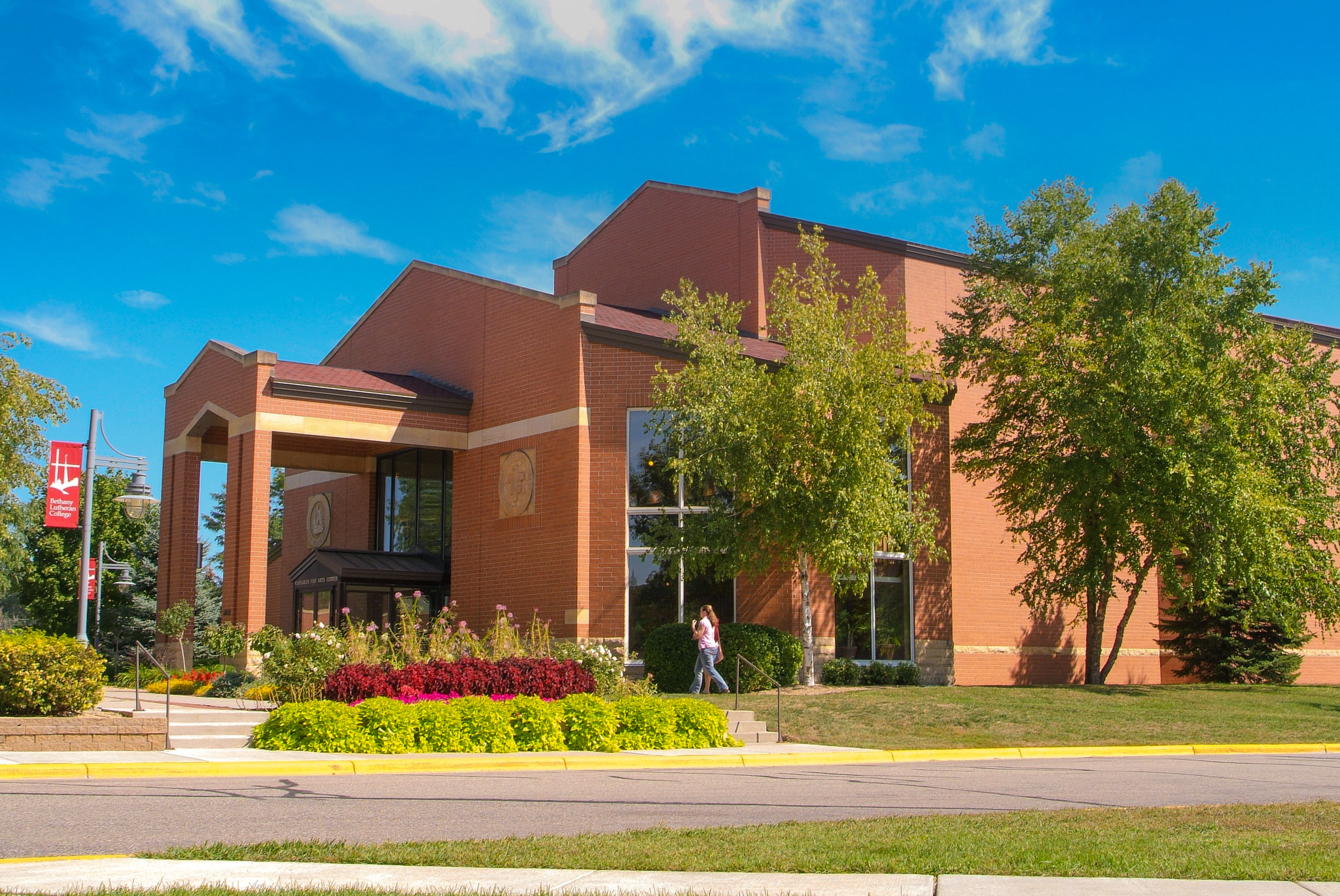
Ylvisaker Fine Arts Center

BLC has three choirs, including a lyric-theatre performance group. In addition, the school has a chamber orchestra, two bands, a handbell group, and a student-led drumming group. The Ylvisaker Fine Arts Center contains an art gallery that frequently features student art, and there are painting, drawing, ceramic, and photo-development studios on the campus. The fine arts center is also the location of the college's theater, which holds four productions every year, including a recurring vaudeville-style show titled "Theatre Physics" and a musical.

=== Publications ===
Bethany Lutheran College has a student newspaper titled The Scroll, a student-produced yearbook titled Fidelis, and a yearly literary magazine titled Inkwell. The Scroll and Inkwell are also published online. Bethany also produces an alumni magazine titled Bethany Magazine which is published three times a year.

=== Clubs and organizations ===
BLC has twenty-four student clubs and organizations, not including their fine-arts activities, athletics, or speech and debate team. Bethany's speech and debate team is designated as part of the Communication Department, not a student-led organization.

=== LGBT prohibition ===
Bethany prohibits same-sex relationships and "public promotion" of homosexuality in its standards of conduct for students. This is consistent with the Evangelical Lutheran Synod's interpretation of Biblical teachings on the subject.

== Athletics ==
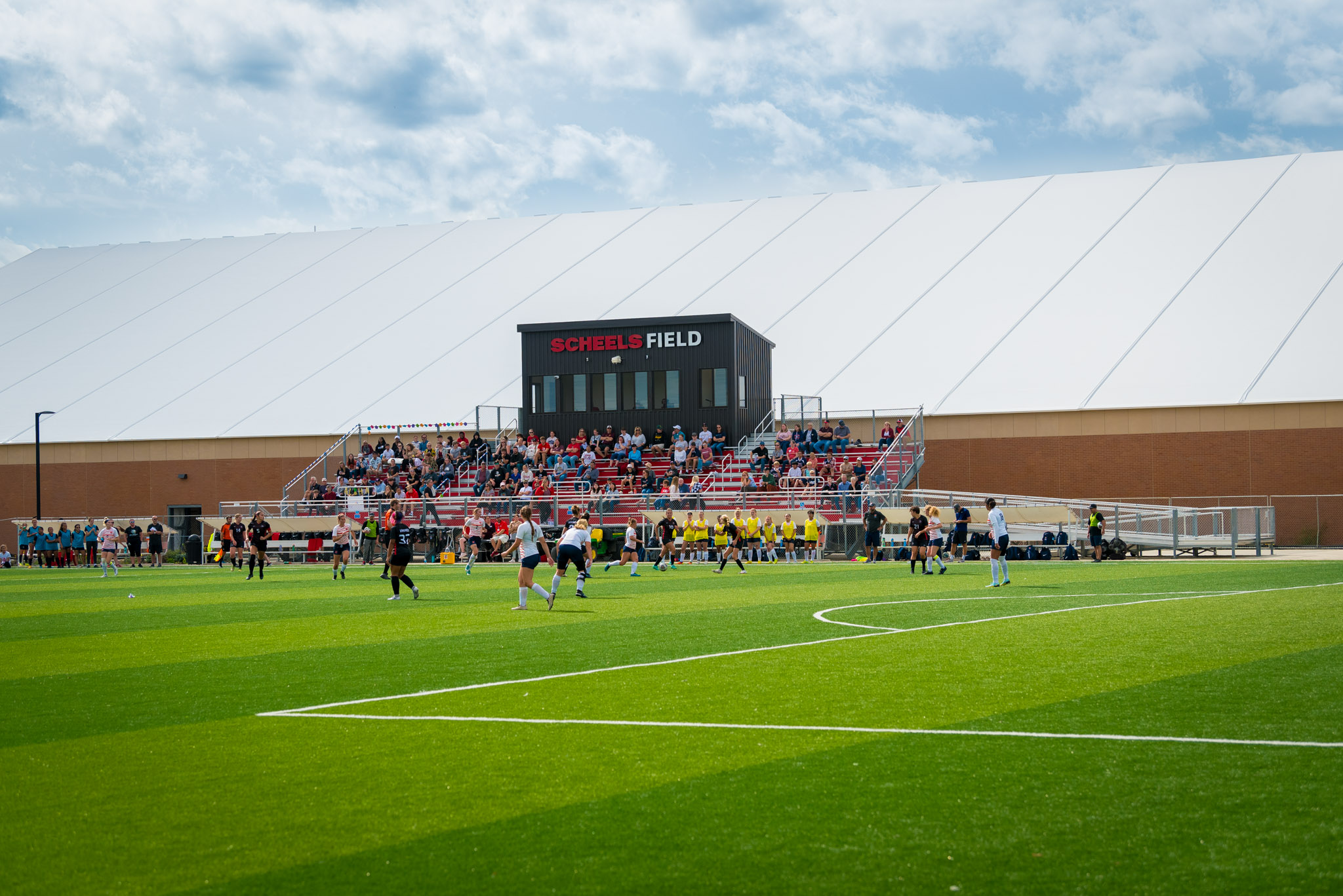
Scheel's Field (foreground) and Bethany Activity Center.

The Vikings are members of the Upper Midwest Athletic Conference in the NCAA Division III. The school offers the following sports: baseball, men's and women's basketball, men and women's cross country, men and women's golf, men's and women's soccer, softball, men's and women's tennis, volleyball, and men's and women's track & field.

In 2020, the men's and woman's basketball teams both won the UMAC Conference Championships. In the 2020 NCAA Division III men's basketball tournament, the men's team was knocked out by Washington University in St. Louis, 102-68. The woman's team entered the first round against Bethel University, a university five times the size of Bethany Lutheran. At that point, no UMAC basketball team had defeated a larger MIAC school in the playoffs, but the Vikings beat Bethel 62-58. They continued on to play University of Wisconsin-Oshkosh, losing 67-60.

The Bethany Vikings Esports Team was founded in 2019 with support by BLC alumnus and esports broadcaster Erik "Doa" Lonnquist, who also serves as the college's Director of Esports Broadcasting. Players compete in League of Legends, Overwatch, and Rocket League. In 2021, the Vikings held the number one spot on the Collegiate Star League (CSL) League of Legends Power Rankings in the Midwest 3 Division with a 9-0 record.

== Rankings ==
In 2022, BLC was ranked 10th nationally (1st in Minnesota) for graduates' social mobility by U.S. News College Rankings in the National Liberal Arts Category.

== Notable graduates ==
- 1949 – Marvin Schwan, founder of the Schwan Food Company.
- 1949 – Darold Treffert, Psychiatrist and Researcher
- 1983 – Jeff Rohrman, professional indoor soccer midfielder
- 1997 – Brad Stromdahl, College Baseball Coach
- 2006 – Erik "DoA" Lonnquist, esports commentator.

== See also ==
- List of colleges and universities in Minnesota
- Higher education in Minnesota
