= Brad Stromdahl =

American baseball coach (born 1977)

Current position
- Title: Head coach
- Team: Georgia State
- Conference: Sun Belt
- Record: 138–160

Biographical details
- Born: April 12, 1977 (age 48); Napa, California, U.S.

Playing career
- 1996–1997: Bethany Lutheran College
- 1998–1999: Southwest Minnesota State
- Position: Catcher

Coaching career (HC unless noted)
- 2003: Marshall (assistant)
- 2004–2006: Central Michigan (assistant)
- 2007–2011: Georgia State (assistant)
- 2012–2019: Georgia Gwinnett
- 2020–present: Georgia State

Head coaching record
- Overall: 138–160 (NCAA) 328–104 (NAIA)
- Tournaments: Sun Belt: 2–3

Brad Stromdahl (born April 12, 1977) is an American college baseball coach and former catcher. He is the head baseball coach at Georgia State University. Stromdahl played college baseball at Bethany Lutheran College from 1996 to 1997 before transferring to Southwest Minnesota State University where he played for coach Paul Blanchard in 1998 and 1999. He served as the head coach at Georgia Gwinnett College from 2012 to 2019.

== Playing career ==
Stromdahl attended Justin-Siena High School in Napa, California before transferring to Lakeland Union High School in Minocqua, Wisconsin. Trout played for the school's varsity baseball, basketball and soccer. Stromdahl then enrolled at Bethany Lutheran College to play college baseball for the Bethany Lutheran Vikings team. After graduating with an associate's degree from Bethany Lutheran, Stromdahl transferred to Southwest Minnesota State University. As a senior in 1999, Stromdahl was named First Team All-Northern Sun Intercollegiate Conference.

== Coaching career ==
On August 14, 2002, Stromdahl became an volunteer assistant at Marshall University. On August 18, 2003, Stromdahl was named an assistant at Central Michigan University. The following year, Stromdahl became an assistant at Georgia State University.

On October 18, 2011, Stromdahl was named the first head coach in the history of the Georgia Gwinnett College program.

On June 26, 2019, Stromdahl was named the head coach of the Georgia State Panthers baseball program.

== Head coaching record ==
Statistics overview
Season	Team	Overall	Conference	Standing	Postseason
Georgia Gwinnett Grizzlies (Independent) (2013–2019)
2013	Georgia Gwinnett	30–25	0–0		
2014	Georgia Gwinnett	53–13	0–0		NAIA World Series
2015	Georgia Gwinnett	50–14	0–0		NAIA Opening Round
2016	Georgia Gwinnett	57–6	0–0		NAIA Opening Round
2017	Georgia Gwinnett	40–21	0–0		NAIA Opening Round
2018	Georgia Gwinnett	50–12	0–0		NAIA World Series
2019	Georgia Gwinnett	48–13	0–0		NAIA World Series
Georgia Gwinnett (NAIA):		328–104	0–0		
Georgia State Panthers (Sun Belt Conference) (2020–present)
2020	Georgia State	9–7	0–0	(East)	Season canceled due to COVID-19
2021	Georgia State	18–37	12–12	5th (East)	Sun Belt Tournament
2022	Georgia State	30–26	15–15	7th	
2023	Georgia State	30–28	16–14	5th (East)	Sun Belt Tournament
2024	Georgia State	25–32	13–17	6th (East)	Sun Belt Tournament
2025	Georgia State	26–30	11–19	12th	
Georgia State:		138–160	67–77		
Total:		138–160			
National champion Postseason invitational champion Conference regular season champion Conference regular season and conference tournament champion Division regular season champion Division regular season and conference tournament champion Conference tournament champion

== See also ==
- List of current NCAA Division I baseball coaches
