= Mike Freitag =

American soccer player and coach

Personal information
- Date of birth: May 7, 1958 (age 68)
- Place of birth: St. Louis, Missouri, U.S.
- Position: Defender

Youth career
- 1976–1979: Indiana Hoosiers

Senior career*
Years	Team	Apps	(Gls)
1980	San Diego Sockers	0	(0)
1980–1982	Denver Avalanche (indoor)	32	(0)

Managerial career
- U.S. U-17 (assistant)
- 1993–2003: Indiana Hoosiers (assistant)
- 2004–2009: Indiana Hoosiers
- 2011: Denver Pioneers (assistant)
- * Club domestic league appearances and goals

Mike Freitag is an American retired soccer defender who played professionally in the Major Indoor Soccer League. He served six seasons as the head coach of the Indiana Hoosiers men's soccer team.

== Player ==
=== Youth ===
Freitag graduated from Christian Brothers College High School in St. Louis, Missouri. He then attended Indiana University where he played on the men's soccer team from 1976 to 1979. He was a 1979 First Team All American. He graduated with bachelor's degree in physical education and earned a master's degree in sports administration from Indiana in 1986.

=== Professional ===
In 1980, Freitag signed with the San Diego Sockers of the North American Soccer League, but played no first team games. That fall, he moved to the Denver Avalanche of the Major Indoor Soccer League.

== Coach ==
After retiring from professional soccer in 1982, Freitag remained in Colorado where he coached at the youth level. He was a member of the U.S. Soccer Federation Coaching Committee from 1990 to 1991. He also spent time as the head coach of both the Colorado State Olympic Development Program (1987) and the Region IV Olympic Development Program (1989–90) .

In 1993, Freitag returned to Indiana University to become an assistant coach with the men's soccer team. In 2004, he replaced Jerry Yeagley as head coach and promptly took the team to the 2004 Division I Men's College Cup championship. He was named the Big Ten Coach of the Year in 2006 and 2007. After the Hoosiers lost 10 games in 2009, the university announced on December 2, 2009, that they would not renew Freitag's contract. In his six seasons as head coach, Frietag compiled an 86–32–19 record. Freitag spent a total of 24 years at Indiana as a player, graduate assistant, assistant coach and head coach and was involved in five of Indiana's eight national championships.

In June 2011, Freitag was added to the University of Denver men's soccer staff as a volunteer assistant coach.
