= Rube Reiswerg =

American basketball player (1912–1998)

Personal information
- Born: August 10, 1912 Indianapolis, Indiana, U.S.
- Died: March 22, 1998 (aged 85) Marion, Indiana, U.S.
- Listed height: 5 ft 8 in (1.73 m)
- Listed weight: 175 lb (79 kg)

Career information
- High school: Emmerich Manual (Indianapolis, Indiana)
- Position: Guard

Career history
- 1938–1939: Goldsmith Secos
- 1939: Indianapolis Kautskys

Ruben Reiswerg (August 10, 1912 – March 22, 1998) was an American professional basketball player. He played for the Indianapolis Kautskys in the National Basketball League for four games during the 1939–40 season and averaged 0.3 points per game.

His grandson is Matt Reiswerg, a professional soccer player and coach.
