= Mike Gentile =

American soccer player

Personal information
- Date of birth: May 24, 1974 (age 52)
- Place of birth: United States
- Height: 5 ft 10 in (1.78 m)
- Position: Midfielder

Youth career
- –1992: Churchill Chargers

College career
Years	Team	Apps	(Gls)
1992–1995	Wisconsin Badgers		

Senior career*
Years	Team	Apps	(Gls)
1996–1999	Milwaukee Rampage		(4)
1999–2002	Minnesota Thunder	82	(5)

International career
1993	United States U-20		
- * Club domestic league appearances and goals

Mike Gentile (born May 24, 1974) is an American former soccer midfielder who, while drafted twice by teams in Major League Soccer, spent his seven-season career in the second division USISL. He was a member of the United States U-20 men's national soccer team at the 1993 FIFA World Youth Championship.

== Early years ==
Gentile attended Livonia Churchill High School, where, as a junior in 1990, he and teammates Scott Lamphear and Jeff Cassar were finalists in the Class A state championship..

== College ==
Gentile attended college at the University of Wisconsin–Madison where he played on the soccer team from 1992 to 1995. In 1995, the Badgers won the NCAA Men's Soccer Championship while Gentile was selected a third team All-American. In 1993, he was part of the United States U-20 men's national soccer team at the 1993 FIFA World Youth Championship, but he never entered a game in the tournament. In 2015, Gentile was added to the UW Athletic Hall of Fame.

== Professional ==
In March 1996, the Colorado Rapids selected Gentile in the first round (9th overall) of the 1996 College Draft. The Rapids released Gentile during the preseason and he signed with the Milwaukee Rampage of the USISL.

In 1997, the Rampage won the league championship. On July 13, 1999, the Rampage unexpectedly released Gentile along with four other players. Gentile had started five games before being benched in June. He immediately signed with the Minnesota Thunder, going on to win the 1999 league championship with his new team.

In February 2000, Gentile was again drafted by an MLS team when the Tampa Bay Mutiny selected him in the sixth round (66th overall) in the 2000 MLS SuperDraft. However, on February 22, 2000, the Mutiny released Gentile and he returned to the Thunder. In 2001, he signed a one-year contract, with a one-year option. He played through at least the 2002 season.
