= Scott Lamphear =

American soccer player and coach (born 1974)

Personal information
- Date of birth: March 9, 1974 (age 52)
- Place of birth: Livonia, Michigan, U.S.
- Position: Defender

College career
Years	Team	Apps	(Gls)
1992–1995	Wisconsin Badgers		

Senior career*
Years	Team	Apps	(Gls)
1996–1997	Rockford Raptors		
1998	Chicago Stingers		
2004	Colorado Springs Blizzard	1	(0)

Managerial career
- 2001–2002: Colorado College men (assistant)
- 2003–2006: Colorado College women (assistant)
- * Club domestic league appearances and goals

Scott Lamphear is an American retired soccer defender and coach. He was a 1995 first team All American and the team MVP on the 1995 NCAA championship Wisconsin Badgers soccer team. He later served as an assistant coach with the Colorado College men's and women's soccer teams.

== Player ==
Lamphear attended the University of Wisconsin where he played on the men's soccer team from 1992 to 1995. In 1995, the Badgers won the NCAA championship as Lamphear was selected as a first team All American. On March 4, 1996, the MetroStars selected Lamphear in the 2nd round (11th overall) of the 1996 MLS College Draft. However, he negotiated with the MetroStars to allow him to finish his degree before joining the team. He graduated in December 1996 with a bachelor's degree in chemical engineering. In 2011, the Badgers inducted Lamphear into the school's Hall of Fame. In the spring of 1997, he joined the MetroStars, but was cut during the preseason. He then played for the Rockford Raptors of the USISL during the 1996 and 1997 seasons and the Chicago Stingers in 1998. In 2011 Lamphear was added to the UW Athletic Hall of Fame.

== Coach ==
In 2001, Colorado College hired Lamphear as an assistant coach with its NCAA Division III men's team. In April 2003, Lamphear became an assistant with the school's NCAA Division I women's team. He held that position until April 2006.

== Early years ==
Lamphear attended Livonia Churchill High School where he played alongside Mike Gentile and Jeff Cassar and were finalist in the 1990 Class A State Championship for the State of Michigan.
