= John Trask (soccer) =

American soccer player and coach

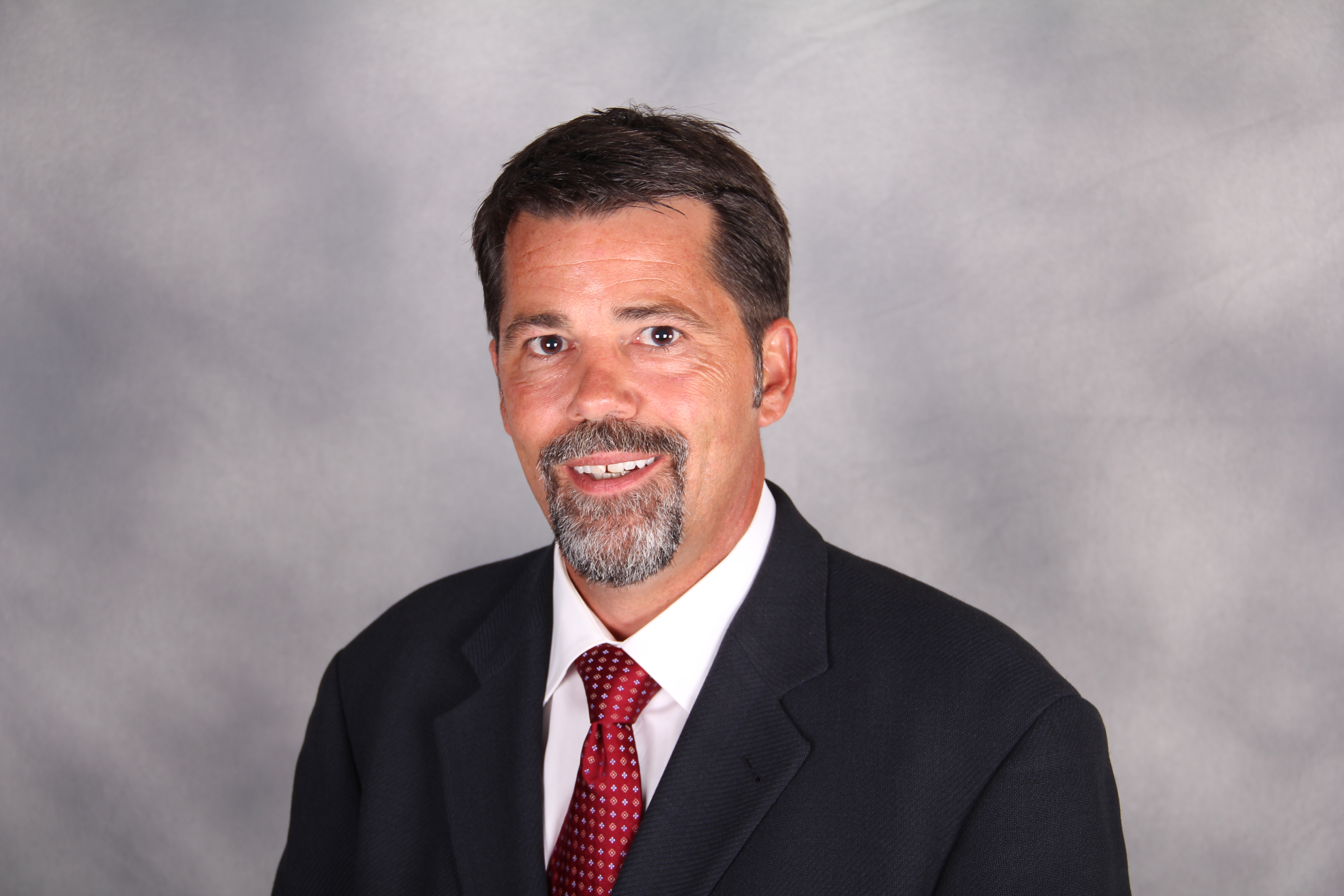

Personal information
- Place of birth: Chicago, Illinois, United States
- Position: Midfielder

College career
Years	Team	Apps	(Gls)
1984–1987	Indiana Hoosiers		

Managerial career
- 1991–1993: Indiana Hoosiers (graduate assistant)
- 1993–1999: Indiana University (assistant)
- 2000–2001: Miami Fusion (assistant)
- 2002–2003: D.C. United (assistant)
- 2004: Dallas Burn (assistant)
- 2005–2009: UIC Flames
- 2010–2021: Wisconsin Badgers
- 2024-present: Bradley Braves (Special Asst. to the Head Coach)

John Trask is the former head men's soccer coach at the University of Wisconsin–Madison, serving from 2010 through 2021. He was announced head soccer coach on January 20, 2010. From 2005 to 2009, he served as the head men's soccer coach at UIC. At UIC, his teams advanced to the NCAA Tournament in 2006 (Round of 32), 2007 (Elite 8), and 2008 (Round of 16). From 2000 to 2004, he was a top assistant coach in Major League Soccer (MLS). In 2004, he was an assistant coach for Dallas Burn, and from 2002 to 2003, he was an assistant coach for D.C. United. From 2000 to 2001, he was an assistant coach with the Miami Fusion. From 1993 to 1999, he was an assistant coach at Indiana University. Trask was tutored by USSF Hall of Fame Coach Jerry Yeagley as well as former NASL great and legendary TV Broadcaster Ray Hudson.

His teams at Wisconsin have advanced to the NCAA Tournament, reaching the Sweet Sixteen in 2017, and 2nd round in 2013. Wisconsin won the Big Ten Tournament in 2017 and were Big Ten Finalists in 2016. In 2024 Trask began working at for Bradley University Men's Soccer as Special Assistant to the Head Coach and Recruiting Coordinator for Tim Regan (former MLS player and Head Scout).

Trask holds a "A" License from the United States Soccer Federation (USSF) and has served as an assistant at the U-17, U-18 and U-23 levels for the USYNT.

John Trask Total Soccer, LLC is a soccer camp which operates in Illinois and Wisconsin. The camp website is www.WisconsinSoccerCamp.com. Trask has been involved with successful soccer camps for four decades.

From 1984 to 1987, he played college soccer for Indiana. As a midfielder, he was a member of the team that reached the 1984 Division 1 final.

In March 2018, Trask was inducted into the Wisconsin Soccer Hall of Fame for his accomplishments as both a player and a coach.
