= 1995 NCAA Division I men's soccer tournament =

Men's College Cup (semifinals & final)

Tournament details
- Country: United States
- Teams: 32

Final positions
- Champions: Wisconsin (1st title)
- Runners-up: Duke (3rd title game)

Tournament statistics
- Matches played: 31
- Goals scored: 92 (2.97 per match)
- Attendance: 96,747 (3,121 per match)
- Top goal scorer(s): Mike Fisher, Virginia (5)

The 1995 NCAA Division I Men's Soccer Tournament was the 36th organized men's college soccer tournament by the National Collegiate Athletic Association, to determine the top college soccer team in the United States. The Wisconsin Badgers won their first national title by defeating the Duke Blue Devils in the championship game, 2–0. The semifinals, on December 8, 1995, and the final match, on December 10, 1995, were played in Richmond, Virginia at Richmond Stadium. All first, second and third round matches were played at the home field of the higher seeded team.

== National Seeds ==
National Seeds
Seed	School	Record
#1	Virginia	18–0–2
#2	SMU	13–3–1
#3	UCLA	17–2–1
#4	South Carolina	15–3

== Play in rounds ==
Play-in round
Davidson	1
Bowling Green	3

== Early rounds ==
First round
1	Virginia	2
Rhode Island	1
Hartwick	3
St. John's (NY)	2
Brown	2
Boston U.	1
Lafayette (a.e.t.)	1
Cornell	0
Penn State	0
Maryland	2
James Madison	1
Princeton	0
Duke	3
UNC Greensboro	0
Coastal Carolina	1
4	South Carolina (a.e.t.)	3
3	UCLA	2
Cal Poly	1
Santa Clara (a.e.t.)	4
San Diego	1
Portland	1
Washington	0
Butler	1
Indiana	0
Wisconsin	2
Bowling Green	0
Creighton	1
William & Mary (a.e.t.)	2
Clemson	2
College of Charleston	0
Saint Louis	1
2	SMU (a.e.t.)	4

Second round
1	Virginia	4
Hartwick	0
Brown	2
Lafayette	0
Maryland	2
James Madison (a.e.t.)/(p)	2
Duke	2
4	South Carolina	0
3	UCLA	1
Santa Clara	2
Portland	4
Butler	1
Wisconsin (a.e.t.)	1
William & Mary	0
Clemson	1
2	SMU	3

Third round
1	Virginia	4
Brown	1
James Madison	2
Duke	3
Santa Clara	1
Portland	2
Wisconsin	2
2	SMU	0

Semifinals; Richmond Stadium; Richmond, Virginia
1	Virginia	2
Duke	3
Portland	0
Wisconsin	1

Championship; Richmond Stadium; Richmond, Virginia
Duke	0
Wisconsin	2

== Final ==
December 10, 1995

Duke	0–2	Wisconsin

Richmond Stadium, Richmond, Virginia
Attendance: 20,703

== See also ==
- 1995 NCAA Division I women's soccer tournament
- 1995 NCAA Division II men's soccer tournament
- 1995 NCAA Division III men's soccer tournament
- 1995 NAIA men's soccer tournament
