= Jeff Rohrman =

American soccer player and coach

Personal information
- Full name: Jeffrey Rohrman
- Date of birth: November 21, 1964 (age 61)
- Place of birth: Warrenton, Virginia, United States
- Position: Midfielder

College career
| Years | Team | Apps | (Gls) |
| 1982–1983 | Bethany Lutheran Vikings | | |
| 1984–1985 | Milwaukee Panthers | | |

Senior career*
| Years | Team | Apps | (Gls) |
| 1986–1987 | Milwaukee Wave (indoor) | 8 | (1) |
| 1989 | Real Santa Barbara | | |

Managerial career
- 1990–1991: Bethany Lutheran College
- 1994: Navy Midshipmen (assistant)
- 1995–2001: Maryland Terrapins (assistant)
- 2002–2008: Wisconsin Badgers
- * Club domestic league appearances and goals

Jeff Rohrman is a retired U.S. soccer midfielder who spent two seasons in the American Indoor Soccer Association and one in the Western Soccer League. He has also coached for nearly twenty years at the collegiate level.

== Player ==
Rohrman began his collegiate career at Bethany Lutheran College, where he was a junior college All-American his sophomore season. In 2008, Bethany Lutheran inducted Rohrman into the school's Athletic Hall of Fame. He then transferred to the University of Wisconsin–Milwaukee in 1984, where he finished his final two years of college eligibility. While at UW-Milwaukee, he was team captain and was voted team MVP following his senior season. Rohrman earned a bachelor's degree in zoology from Wisconsin-Milwaukee in 1986 and his master's degree in physical education and sports administration from Mankato State College in 1991.

Rohrman was invited to the 1986 Olympic Soccer Festival in Houston. In 1986 and 1987, he played for the Milwaukee Wave of the American Indoor Soccer Association and Real Santa Barbara of the Western Soccer League in 1989.

== Coach ==
In 1990, Rohrman began his coaching career as head coach of Bethany Lutheran College. He then spent several seasons as an assistant women's soccer coach at the U.S. Naval Academy. Rohrman also worked as an intern for the U.S. Olympic Committee, where he coordinated the competition for the U-20 National Team. He was then the top assistant at the University of Maryland, College Park, for seven years.

In 2002, he was hired as the head men's soccer coach at the University of Wisconsin–Madison. Wisconsin recorded the 300th win in program history under his watch; in 2006, Wisconsin was ranked in the polls for the first time in more than 7 years after upsetting number seven Illinois-Chicago. In November 2008, he resigned after compiling a 61–63–12 record.

Now, Coach Rohrman coaches for Bethesda Soccer Club in Maryland. His wife, Nancy Rohrman, a former U.S. national team member, also coaches for Bethesda.
