= Jerry Yeagley =

American soccer player and coach

Jerry Yeagley (born January 10, 1940, in Lebanon, Pennsylvania) is an American former soccer player and coach. He was the coach of the Indiana Hoosiers men's soccer team from 1973 to 2003. His teams won six NCAA Championships and a Division I record 544 games. He is considered the most successful collegiate men's soccer coach in the history of the sport. His overall career record was 544-101-45 (.828). He never had a losing season as a head coach. Yeagley was also an NCAA Champion in soccer as a player, winning the national championship with West Chester in 1961.

== Coaching career ==
After earning a Master's degree from the University of Pittsburgh in 1963, Yeagley went to Indiana University as a Physical Education instructor and men's soccer coach. The team had been a club since 1947, but Yeagley's goal was to develop it into a varsity program. For ten years, with no money from the University for Yeagley's salary, team travel expenses, recruiting or uniforms, Yeagley, his wife Marilyn and the players lined the field, hung signs on campus and washed the players' uniforms.

Once the program gained varsity status and the full support of the university in 1973, Yeagley's teams quickly became a national power. Indiana reached the NCAA final in just its fourth season as a varsity program in 1976. In fact, through his 31-year career, Yeagley took every one of his four-year players to the NCAA College Cup, soccer's version of the Final Four. His teams made 28 NCAA tournament appearances, 16 appearances in the College Cup, and 12 appearances in the national final, while winning 10 Big Ten championships and 6 National championships — 1982, 1983, 1988, 1998, 1999, 2003 — the last one in his final season.

== Legacy ==
Yeagley has helped inspire a number of his players to become coaches. There are more than 20 former IU players or coaches in the collegiate coaching ranks, while professional coaches who played under Yeagley include Caleb Porter, Mike Anhaeuser, Juergen Sommer and Pat Noonan.

Yeagley's son Todd played for him at Indiana from 1991 to 1994, winning the 1994 Hermann Trophy from the Missouri Athletic Club and being named a First-Team All-American. After playing for the Columbus Crew of Major League Soccer from 1996 to 2002, Todd returned to Indiana as a volunteer assistant coach during his father's last season. On December 18, 2009, Todd Yeagley was named Head Coach at Indiana.
