= Todd Yeagley =

American soccer player and coach

Personal information
- Date of birth: September 20, 1972 (age 54)
- Place of birth: Bloomington, Indiana, United States
- Height: 6 ft 0 in (1.83 m)
- Positions: Midfielder; defender

College career
Years	Team	Apps	(Gls)
1991–1994	Indiana University		

Senior career*
Years	Team	Apps	(Gls)
1995	→ Richmond Kickers (loan)		
1996–2002	Columbus Crew	155	(6)

Managerial career
- 2003–2008: Indiana Hoosiers (assistant)
- 2009: Wisconsin Badgers
- 2010–: Indiana Hoosiers
- * Club domestic league appearances and goals

Todd Yeagley is a retired U.S. soccer player who is the head men's soccer coach for the Indiana University Hoosiers. He played seven seasons in Major League Soccer with the Columbus Crew and one in the USISL with the Richmond Kickers. He is the son of legendary Indiana University soccer coach Jerry Yeagley.

== Player ==
=== College ===
Yeagley elected to play for the Indiana Hoosiers men's soccer team under his father. Yeagley earned second team All-American honors his first three years at Indiana as a forward, midfielder and defender. His senior year, the team made it to the NCAA championship before losing to Virginia. That year he earned first team All-American honors and the Missouri Athletic Club named him as the player of the year. He graduated in 1994 with a bachelor's degree in sociology.

=== National team ===
While at Indiana, Yeagley appeared with several junior national teams, including the U-20 national team and the national B-team. At the time, the United States Soccer Federation had two distinct national teams, the A and B team . The A team players tended to be under contract with USSF to play for the national team. B team members could also be under contract, but were more typically amateur or college players. Yeagley fell in this second category. As a B team member, he never played a full international for the U.S., but competed in subsidiary international competitions. He competed at the 1993 World University games.

=== Professional ===
Yeagley signed with Major League Soccer in January 1995, as the new league was laying the groundwork for its first season. The league signed players who then entered a pool for the league's first draft which did not take place until 1996. MLS had originally intended to begin play in the fall of 1995, but delayed a year when it experienced problems with stadiums, sponsorship and team ownership. Rather than have the players it signed sit idle for a year, MLS loaned them to various domestic and foreign teams. For Yeagley, MLS loaned him to the Richmond Kickers of the USISL Premier Division (U.S. Second Division). That season, the Kickers achieved a double when it won both the league and 1995 U.S. Open Cup titles.

When MLS held its Inaugural Draft, Yeagley was selected by the Columbus Crew in the 8th round (71st overall). He went on to play seven years as a defender with the Crew, retiring following the 2002 season.

== Coach ==
When Yeagley retired from playing in 2002, he moved to the Crew's front office as an assistant general manager for a year. When Yeagley's father announced that he planned to retire from coaching after the 2003 NCAA season, Yeagley left the Crew and joined the Indiana soccer team as a non-paid assistant coach. The team went on to win the NCAA championship. The next year, Indiana brought Yeagley in as a full-time assistant and he had the good fortune to again see his team win the NCAA championship in penalties against the University of California, Santa Barbara. In 2008, the University of Wisconsin–Madison hired Yeagley to replace Jeff Rohrman as head coach of the school's men's soccer team. In December 2009, Yeagley was named Head Coach of the Hoosiers. In 2012, Yeagley guided the Hoosiers to their 8th championship. The Hoosiers became the first 16 seed to win the College Cup.

Yeagley earned his 100th career win as a head coach on October 3, 2017, when the #1 ranked Hoosiers defeated the Evansville Purple Aces 4–0. The win brought the Hoosiers record to 9–0–2. Yeagley coached the Hoosiers to an undefeated record that year, earning a 13–0–4 record. He earned his 200th win 7 years and 15 days later, when the Hoosiers defeated the Michigan State Spartans 3–1 in Bloomington on October 18, 2024.
