= Jesse Owens Memorial Stadium =

College sports stadium in Columbus, Ohio, USA

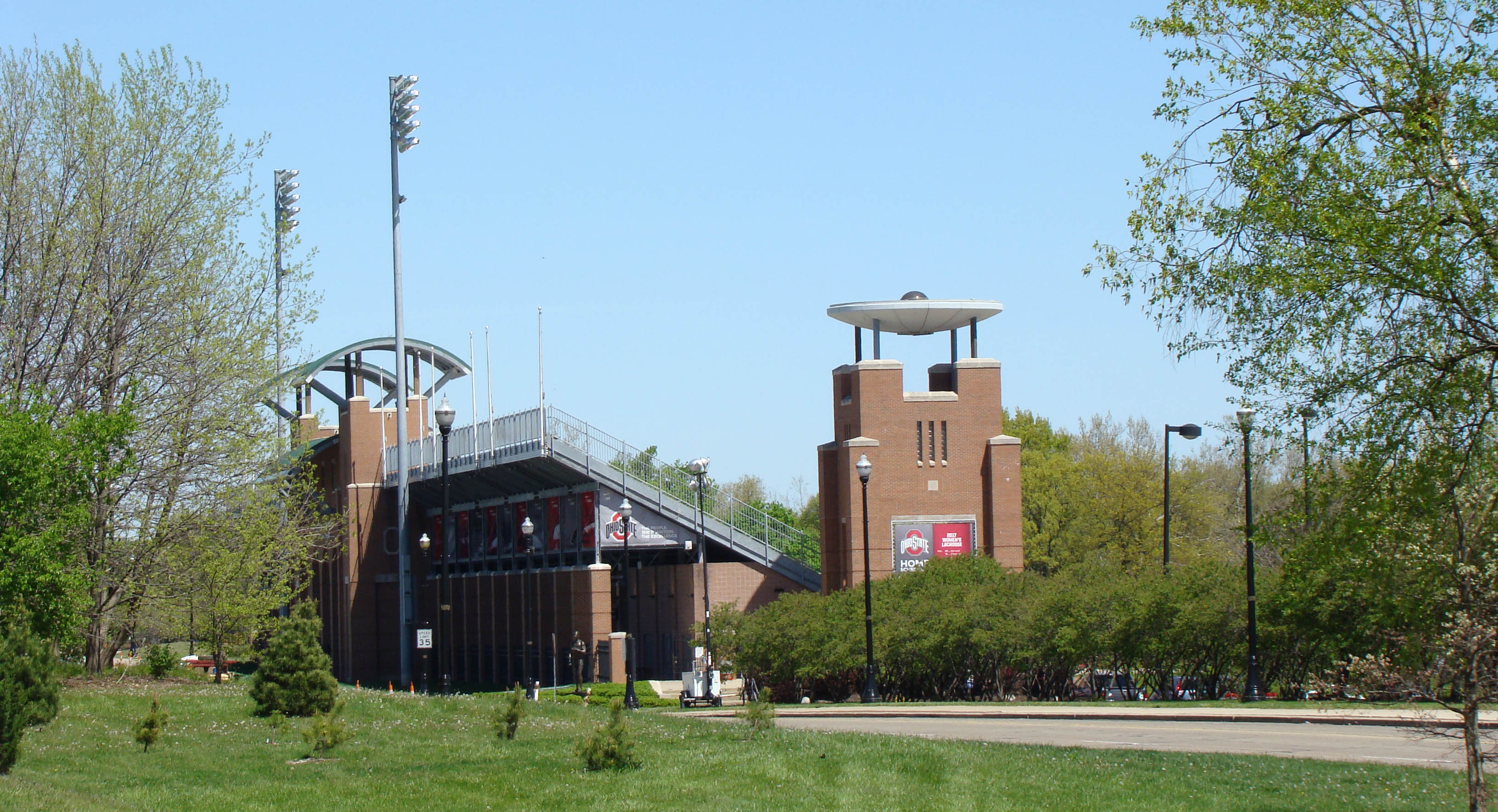
- Exterior view of the stadium in 2017
- Interactive map of Jesse Owens Memorial Stadium
- Location: 2450 Fred Taylor Drive; Columbus, OH 43210
- Owner: Ohio State University
- Operator: Ohio State University
- Capacity: 10,000
- Surface: Lawn

Construction
- Groundbreaking: October 13, 1998
- Opened: August 4, 2001; 25 years ago
- Cost: USD $6.5 Million
- Architects: Moody•Nolan, Inc.

Tenants
- Ohio State Buckeyes (NCAA) teams: Men's lacrosse (2001–2023); Women's lacrosse (2001–2023); Men's soccer (2001–present); Women's soccer (2001–present); Men's track and field (2001–present); Women's track and field (2001–present)

Website
- ohiostatebuckeyes.com/soccerstadium

Jesse Owens Memorial Stadium is a 10,000-capacity stadium located in Columbus, Ohio, United States. The stadium is home of the Ohio State Buckeyes men's and women's soccer and track and field teams. The stadium opened for soccer in the fall of 2001.

It also hosts the Ohio High School Athletic Association (OHSAA) boys and girls track and field State Tournament. It is named after former OSU athlete, Jesse Owens, with that honor transferred from the cinder track of Ohio Stadium, which then had football seating expanded over its footprint after the opening of this venue. Owens (September 12, 1913 – March 31, 1980) was an American track and field athlete and four-time Olympic gold medalist at the 1936 Games in Berlin, Germany.

== Specifications by sport ==
Sport	Dimensions
Soccer	76 yd × 118 yd (69 m × 108 m)
Men's lacrosse	60 yd × 110 yd (55 m × 101 m)
Women's lacrosse	70 yd × 120 yd (64 m × 110 m)
Track & field	Nine (9) lanes - 48 in (120 cm) wide

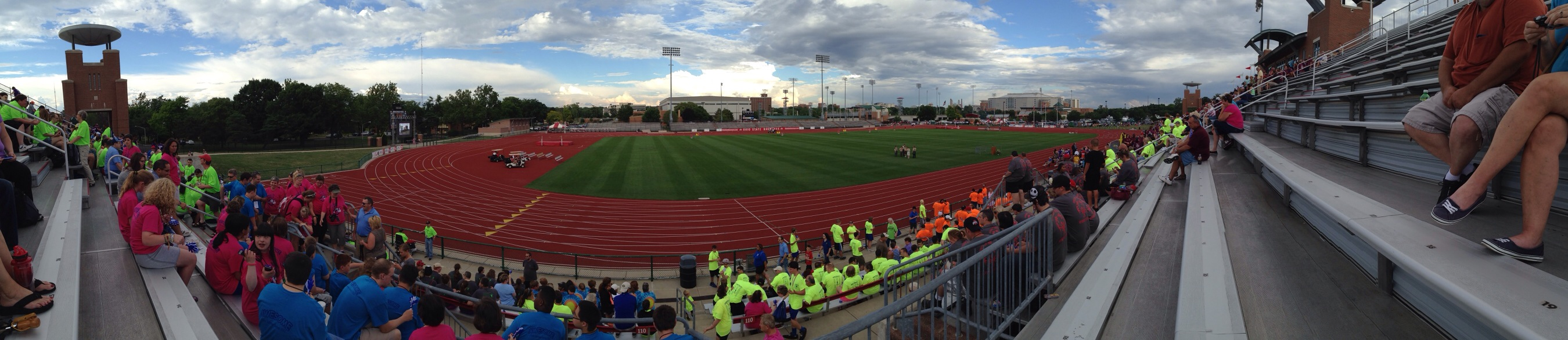
Interior view of the stadium in 2013
