= Wisconsin Badgers men's soccer =

Men's soccer team of the University of Wisconsin

- Founded: 1977; 49 years ago
- University: University of Wisconsin, Madison
- Head coach: Neil Jones (5th season)
- Conference: Big Ten
- Location: Madison, Wisconsin, US
- Stadium: Dan McClimon Memorial Track/Soccer Complex (capacity: 2,000)
- Nickname: Badgers
- Colors: Cardinal and White
Home	Away

NCAA tournament championships
- 1995

NCAA tournament College Cup
- 1995

NCAA tournament Quarterfinals
- 1993, 1995

NCAA tournament Round of 16
- 1991, 1993, 1995, 2017

NCAA tournament appearances
- 1981, 1991, 1993, 1994, 1995, 2013, 2017

Conference tournament championships
- 1995, 2017

Conference regular season championships
- 1991, 1992, 1995

The Wisconsin Badgers men's soccer team is a varsity intercollegiate athletic team of the University of Wisconsin–Madison in Madison, Wisconsin, United States. The team is a member of the Big Ten Conference, which is part of the National Collegiate Athletic Association's Division I. Wisconsin's first men's soccer team was fielded in 1977. The team plays its home games at Dan McClimon Memorial Track/Soccer Complex. The Badgers are coached by Neil Jones.

The Badgers' greatest success came during the mid-1990s, where the program won the NCAA championship and Big Ten Conference Men's Soccer Tournament in 1995. They won their second Big Ten Tournament in 2017. The program has produced professional soccer players including Sam Brotherton and A. J. Cochran.

== Players ==
=== Current roster ===
As of December 2024

Note: Flags indicate national team as defined under FIFA eligibility rules; some limited exceptions apply. Players may hold more than one non-FIFA nationality.

No.	Pos.	Nation	Player
1	GK	CAN	Matisse Hébert
2	DF	ISL	Birgir Baldvinsson
3	MF	USA	Noah Glorioso
4	MF	USA	Julian Kuhr
5	DF	USA	Ryan Quintos
6	DF	USA	Roberto Burlew
7	FW	USA	Kevin Andrews
8	MF	USA	Trip Fleming
9	FW	USA	Markie Hrvojevic
10	MF	USA	Charlie Crockford
11	FW	GER	Mason Henderson
12	DF	USA	Drew Brown

No.	Pos.	Nation	Player
13	FW	USA	Dean Boltz
16	FW	USA	Roman Eisa
17	DF	USA	Ryan Keefe
18	MF	USA	Matthew Zachemski
20	FW	NZL	Thomas Raimbault
23	DF	USA	Will Smith
24	DF	USA	Eliot Popkewitz
25	DF	ENG	Ellis Jones
26	MF	ENG	Liam Chadwick
28	MF	USA	Andrew Chavez
30	GK	USA	Adam Braman
33	GK	USA	Luke Shrivers

== Head coaches ==
=== Current staff ===
Position	Name
Head coach	Neil Jones
Assistant coach	Nate Boyden
Assistant coach	Ryan Osborne
Assistant coach	Daniel Bermingham

=== Head coaching history ===
#	Name	Tenure
1	Bill Reddan	1977–1981
2	Jim Launder	1982–1996
3	Kalekeni Banda	1997–2001
4	Jeff Rohrman	2002–2008
5	Todd Yeagley	2009
6	John Trask	2010–2021
7	Neil Jones	2022–

== Seasons ==
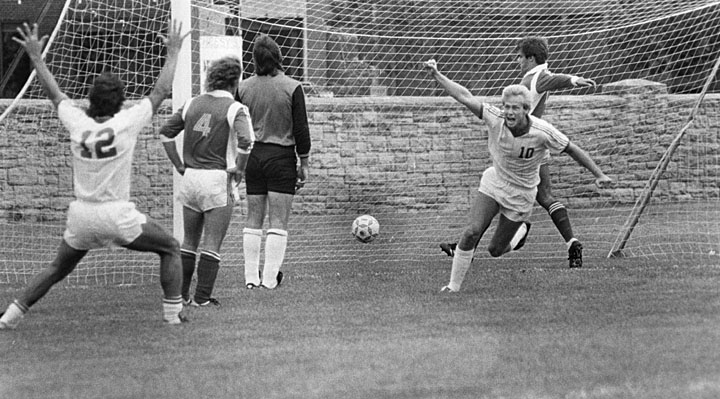
A Wisconsin match c. 1975

Season	Coach	Overall	Conference	Standing	Postseason
Bill Reddan (Big Ten) (1977–1981)
1977	Bill Reddan	6–5–1	2–2–0		
1978	Bill Reddan	8–7–2	5–1–1		
1979	Bill Reddan	10–5–1	2–1–1		
1980	Bill Reddan	10–8–3	4–2–1		
1981	Bill Reddan	15–2–2	3–2–0		NCAA First Round
Bill Reddan:		49–27–9	16–8–3		
Jim Launder (Big Ten) (1982–1996)
1982	Jim Launder	10–6–2	2–1–0		
1983	Jim Launder	11–5–4	2–1–1		
1984	Jim Launder	12–6–2	3–0–1		
1985	Jim Launder	12–7–1	3–1–1		
1986	Jim Launder	13–6–1	3–0–0		
1987	Jim Launder	13–8–1	2–1–0		
1988	Jim Launder	12–4–4	2–1–0		
1989	Jim Launder	13–2–3	2–0–1		
1990	Jim Launder	8–8–4	0–1–2		
1991	Jim Launder	17–4–1	5–0–0	1st	NCAA Second Round
1992	Jim Launder	12–5–2	4–0–1	1st	
1993	Jim Launder	15–4–4	3–1–1	2nd	NCAA Quarterfinal
1994	Jim Launder	14–6–0	2–3–0	T-3rd	NCAA First Round
1995	Jim Launder	20–4–1	4–1–0	1st	Big Ten co-champions NCAA Champions
1996	Jim Launder	11–5–5	2–2–1	T-3rd	
Jim Launder:		193–80–35	39–13–9		
Kalekeni Banda (Big Ten) (1997–2001)
1997	Kalekeni Banda	7–13–0	2–3–0	T-4th	
1998	Kalekeni Banda	4–15–1	1–4–0	T-4th	
1999	Kalekeni Banda	6–13–1	1–4–0	T-5th	
2000	Kalekeni Banda	10–9–1	3–3–0	T-4th	
2001	Kalekeni Banda	10–8–1	3–3–0	T-4th	
Kalekeni Banda:		37–58–4	10–17–0		
Jeff Rohrman (Big Ten) (2002–2008)
2002	Jeff Rohrman	9–10–0	3–3–0	T-2nd	
2003	Jeff Rohrman	11–10–1	1–4–1	5th	
2004	Jeff Rohrman	9–10–0	2–4–0	4th	
2005	Jeff Rohrman	8–11–0	2–4–0	T-5th	
2006	Jeff Rohrman	9–8–2	3–2–1	T-2nd	
2007	Jeff Rohrman	6–7–6	0–3–3	6th	
2008	Jeff Rohrman	9–7–3	1–4–1	7th	
Jeff Rohrman:		61–63–12	12–24–6		
Todd Yeagley (Big Ten) (2009)
2009	Todd Yeagley	7–9–2	3–3–0	4th	
Todd Yeagley:		7–9–2	3–3–0		
John Trask (Big Ten) (2010–2021)
2010	John Trask	4–13–1	1–4–1	7th	
2011	John Trask	10–8–2	4–2–0	T-2nd	Big Ten Semifinals
2012	John Trask	6–8–5	1–3–2	6th	Big Ten Quarterfinals
2013	John Trask	14–5–2	4–2–0	2nd	Big Ten Quarterfinals; NCAA Second Round
2014	John Trask	3–12–3	0–7–1	9th	Big Ten Play-In
2015	John Trask	5–11–3	2–3–3	7th	Big Ten Quarterfinals
2016	John Trask	11–4–4	4–2–2	3rd	Big Ten Runners-up
2017	John Trask	10–4–5	4–3–1	5th	Big Ten Champions
2018	John Trask	10–6–2	6–2–0	2nd	Big Ten Semifinals
2019	John Trask	3–11–4	1–4–3	7th	Big Ten Quarterfinals
2020	John Trask	2–7–1	2–7–1	9th	
2021	John Trask	7–7–3	4–5–1	T-5th	Big Ten Quarterfinals
John Trask:		85–96–35	33–44–15		
Neil Jones (Big Ten) (2022–present)
2022	Neil Jones	6–6–4	3–4–1	T-6th	Big Ten Quarterfinals
2023	Neil Jones	6–5–6	2–2–4	8th	Big Ten Quarterfinals
2024	Neil Jones	7–5–3	2–5–3	10th	
Neil Jones:		19–16–13	7–11–8		
Total:		451–349–110			
National champion Postseason invitational champion Conference regular season champion Conference regular season and conference tournament champion Division regular season champion Division regular season and conference tournament champion Conference tournament champion

=== NCAA tournament results ===
Wisconsin have appeared in seven NCAA Tournaments. Their most recent appearance came in 2017.

Year	Record	Seed	Region	Round	Opponent	Results
1981	15–2–2	—N/a	—N/a	Second round	Indiana	L 1–5
1991	17–4–1	—N/a	—N/a	First round Second round	Evansville; Indiana	W 2–0; L 0–1 (a.e.t.)
1993	15–4–4	—N/a	—N/a	First round Second round Quarterfinals	Notre Dame; Indiana; Virginia	W 2–1; W 1–0; L 0–3
1994	14–6–0	—N/a	1	First round	SMU	L 1–2
1995	20–4–1	—N/a	2	First round Second round Quarterfinals; Semifinals; Championship	Bowling Green; William & Mary #2 SMU; Portland; Duke	W 2–0; W 1–0; W 2–0; W 1–0; W 2–0
2013	14–5–2	—N/a	3	First round Second round	Milwaukee #3 Notre Dame	W 1–0; L 0–4
2017	12–5–5	—N/a	2	First round Second round Third round	Illinois-Chicago #12 Notre Dame #5 Akron	W 4–1; W 1–0 (a.e.t.); L 2–3 (a.e.t.)

== Rivalries ==
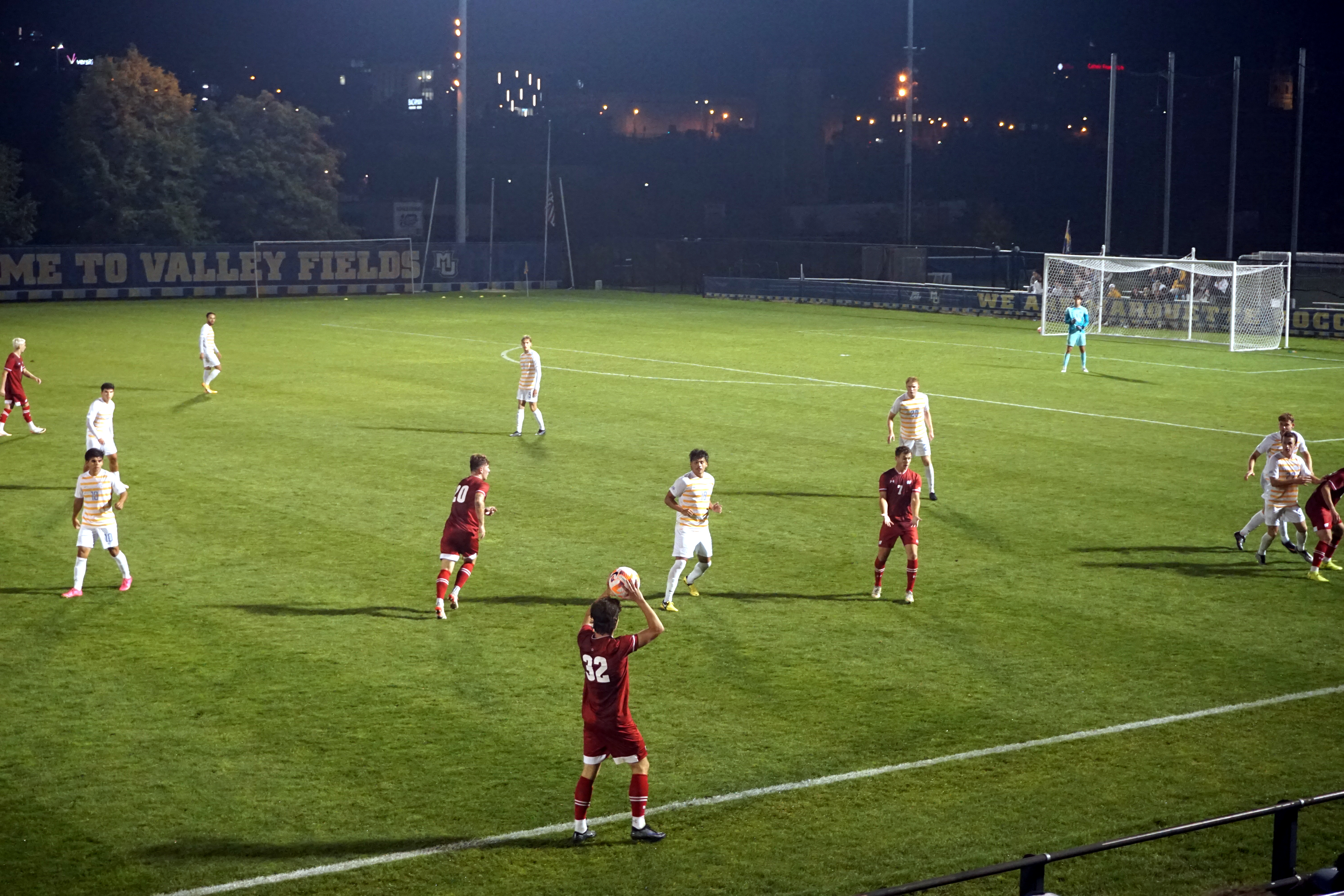
Wisconsin in action against Marquette

Wisconsin has rivalries with the three in-state Division I programs.

- Green Bay Phoenix men's soccer: the two program compete for the Chancellor's Cup when they meet
- Marquette Golden Eagles men's soccer
- Milwaukee Panthers men's soccer: the two programs compete for the Governor's Cup when they meet

=== Governor's Cup ===
As of September 1, 2019

Milwaukee victories	Wisconsin victories

No.	Date	Location	Winner	Score
1	October 20, 1995	Hartland, WI	Wisconsin	1–0
2	October 6, 2000	Madison, WI	Wisconsin	3–2
3	October 5, 2001	Milwaukee, WI	Milwaukee	3–1
4	October 16, 2002	Madison, WI	Milwaukee	1–0
5	October 1, 2003	Milwaukee, WI	Wisconsin	1–0
6	October 6, 2004	Madison, WI	Wisconsin	2–1
7	October 4, 2005	Milwaukee, WI	Milwaukee	2–0
8	September 20, 2006	Madison, WI	Tie	2–2
9	October 10, 2007	Milwaukee, WI	Tie	1–1
10	November 5, 2009	Milwaukee, WI	Wisconsin	1–0
11	October 27, 2010	Madison, WI	Wisconsin	2–0

No.	Date	Location	Winner	Score
12	October 26, 2011	Milwaukee, WI	Wisconsin	2–0
13	October 10, 2012	Madison, WI	Milwaukee	1–0
14	October 23, 2013	Milwaukee, WI	Tie	1–1
15	November 21, 2013 (Note: NCAA Tournament game.)	Madison, WI	Wisconsin	1–0
16	October 22, 2014	Madison, WI	Wisconsin	1–0
17	October 21, 2015	Milwaukee, WI	Wisconsin	1–0
18	October 18, 2016	Madison, WI	Wisconsin	3–0
19	October 24, 2017	Milwaukee, WI	Tie	0–0
20	October 3, 2018	Madison, WI	Tie	1–1
21	October 2, 2019	Milwaukee, WI	Milwaukee	1–0
Series: Wisconsin leads 11–5–5
