= Indiana Hoosiers men's soccer =

American college soccer team

- 2026 Indiana Hoosiers men's soccer team
- Founded: 1973; 53 years ago
- Head coach: Todd Yeagley (18th season)
- Conference: Big Ten
- Location: Bloomington, Indiana, US
- Stadium: Bill Armstrong Stadium (capacity: 6,500)
- Nickname: Indiana Hoosiers
- Colors: Crimson and White
Home	Away

NCAA tournament championships
- 1982, 1983, 1988, 1998, 1999, 2003, 2004, 2012

NCAA tournament runner-up
- 1976, 1978, 1980, 1984, 1994, 2001, 2017, 2020, 2022

NCAA tournament College Cup
- 1976, 1978, 1980, 1982, 1983, 1984, 1988, 1989, 1991, 1994, 1997, 1998, 1999, 2000, 2001, 2003, 2004, 2012, 2017, 2018, 2020, 2022

NCAA tournament Quarterfinals
- 1976, 1978, 1979, 1980, 1981, 1982, 1983, 1984, 1988, 1989, 1990, 1991, 1992, 1994, 1996, 1997, 1998, 1999, 2000, 2001, 2003, 2004, 2008, 2012, 2017, 2018, 2020, 2022, 2023

NCAA tournament appearances
- 1974, 1976, 1977, 1978, 1979, 1980, 1981, 1982, 1983, 1984, 1985, 1987, 1988, 1989, 1990, 1991, 1992, 1993, 1994, 1995, 1996, 1997, 1998, 1999, 2000, 2001, 2002, 2003, 2004, 2005, 2006, 2007, 2008, 2009, 2010, 2011, 2012, 2013, 2014, 2015, 2016, 2017, 2018, 2019, 2020, 2021, 2022, 2023, 2024, 2025, 2026

Conference tournament championships
- 1991, 1992, 1994, 1995, 1996, 1997, 1998, 1999, 2001, 2003, 2006, 2013, 2018, 2019, 2020, 2023, 2026

Conference regular season championships
- 1993, 1994, 1996, 1997, 1998, 1999, 2000, 2001, 2002, 2003, 2004, 2006, 2007, 2010, 2018, 2019, 2020, 2023, 2024, 2026

The Indiana Hoosiers men's soccer team represents Indiana University Bloomington. The team is a member of the Big Ten Conference of the National Collegiate Athletic Association.

The Hoosiers have won eight national championships in men's soccer (1982, 1983, 1988, 1998, 1999, 2003, 2004 and 2012).1 2 Big Ten Players of the Year are from Indiana.

Indiana players have won six Hermann Trophies (including Ken Snow twice) and three Missouri Athletic Club Player of the Year awards. The Hoosiers have produced 13 United States men's national soccer team players, six Olympians and six World Cup players. In addition, Hoosier players have earned All-America honors 52 times.

== History ==
=== Jerry Yeagley era (1973–2003) ===
Once the program gained varsity status and the full support of the university in 1973, Yeagley's teams quickly became a national power. Indiana reached the NCAA final in just its fourth season as a varsity program in 1976. In fact, through his 31-year career, Yeagley took every one of his four-year players to the NCAA College Cup, soccer's version of the Final Four. His teams made 28 NCAA tournament appearances, 16 appearances in the College Cup, and 12 appearances in the national final, while winning 10 Big Ten championships and 6 National championships — 1982, 1983, 1988, 1998, 1999, 2003 — the last one in his final season.

=== Mike Freitag era (2004–2009) ===
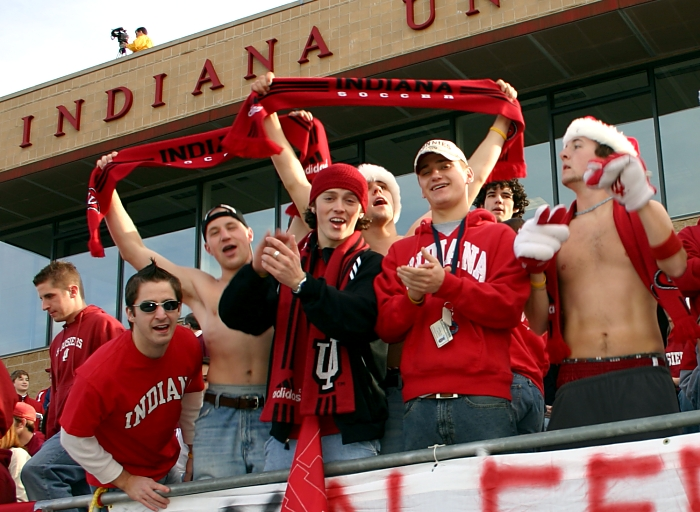
Fans at game at Jerry Yeagley Field at Bill Armstrong Stadium in 2004

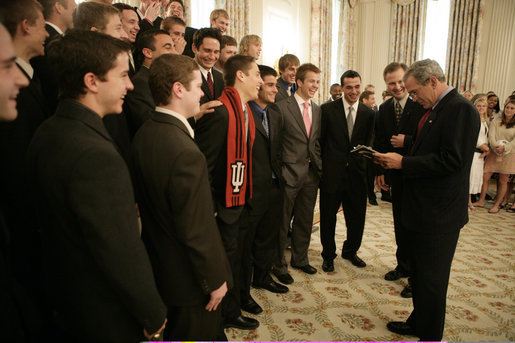
The 2004 team at the White House in May 2005 with President George W. Bush

After leading the Hoosiers for 31 years, Yeagley retired after the 2003 season and was replaced by longtime assistant and former Hoosier All-American Mike Freitag. He was an assistant to Yeagley for 11 seasons before taking over the head job. Freitag added the program's seventh national title in his inaugural year in 2004, when they beat UC Santa Barbara after a penalty shootout.

=== Todd Yeagley era (2010–present) ===
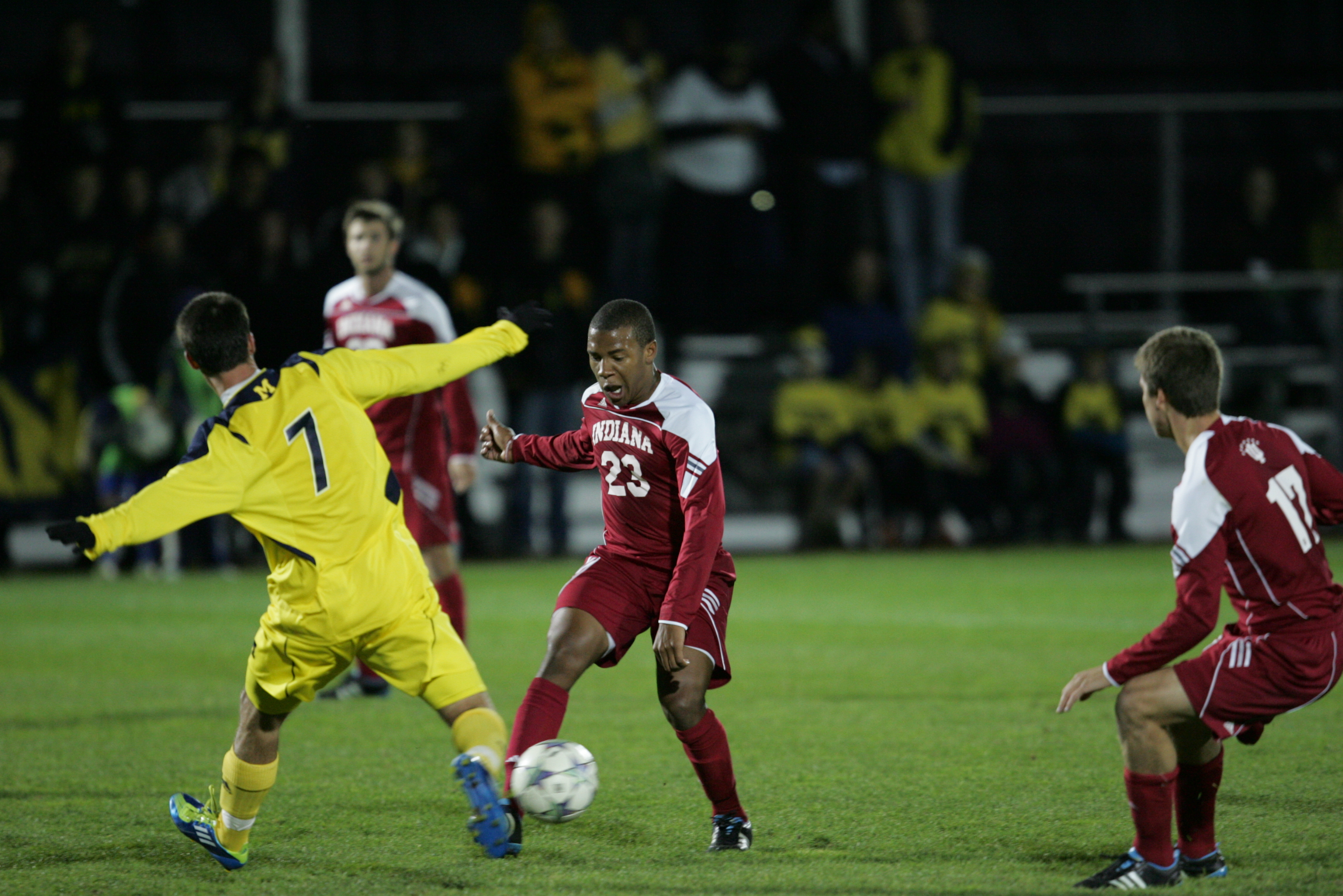
Indiana at Michigan in October 2011

Todd Yeagley became coach in 2010.

In 2013, Indiana endured a rough regular season and first losing season in program history. However, with 3 wins in the Big Ten Tournament they won their first title since 2006 to earn the Big Ten automatic bid and advance to their 27th straight NCAA Tournament. IU lost to Akron 3–2 in opening round of NCAA Tournament.

Yeagley earned his 100th career win as a head coach on October 3, 2017, when the #1 ranked Hoosiers defeated the Evansville Purple Aces 4–0. The win brought the Hoosiers record to 9–0–2. Yeagley coached the Hoosiers to an undefeated record that year, earning a 13–0–4 record. He earned his 200th win 7 years and 15 days later, when the Hoosiers defeated the Michigan State Spartans 3–1 in Bloomington on October 18, 2024.

== Players ==
=== Current roster ===
As of Aug 2026

Note: Flags indicate national team as defined under FIFA eligibility rules; some limited exceptions apply. Players may hold more than one non-FIFA nationality.

No.	Pos.	Nation	Player
0	GK	USA	AJ Piela
2	FW	USA	Nolan Kinsella
4	DF	USA	Josh Maher
5	DF	USA	Nick McHenry
6	MF	GBR	Alex Matthews
7	MF	ITA	Jacopo Fedrizzi
8	FW	USA	Oliver Moller-Jensen
9	FW	FRA	Stephen Njike
10	FW	USA	Bennett Painter
11	FW	GHA	Collins Oduro
12	MF	USA	Grant Paskus
13	DF	USA	Alex Barger
14	FW	USA	Easton Bogard
15	FW	USA	Luka Bezzera
16	MF	USA	Charlie Heuer

No.	Pos.	Nation	Player
17	MF	USA	Justin Shreffler
18	FW	USA	Dempsey Resich
19	DF	USA	Breckin Minzey
20	FW	USA	Clay Murador
21	FW	GHA	Michael Adu-Gyamfi
22	MF	USA	EJ Dreher
23	MF	USA	Wes Carnevale
24	FW	USA	Owen Sloan
25	DF	USA	Luke Reidell
26	DF	USA	Drew Gaydosh
27	DF	USA	Sam Hess
28	DF	USA	Vincent Uglow
30	GK	USA	Cooper Johnsen
31	GK	USA	Michal Mroz
99	GK	USA	Ryan Hunsucker

=== Notable alumni ===
- (France) **Joris Ahlinvi (2019)**
- (United States) Eric Alexander (2006–2009)
- (United States) **Kevin Alston (2006–2008)**
- (United States) Michael Anhaeuser (1988–1991)
- (United States) Rich Balchan (2007–2010)
- (United States) **Richard Ballard (2012–2016)**
- (Honduras) Armando Betancourt (1979–1981)
- (United States) Will Bruin (2008–2010)
- (United States) **Rece Buckmaster (2015–2018)**
- (United States) **Jacob Bushue (2010–2013)**
- (United States) Mike Clark (1991–1994)
- (United States) Angelo DiBernardo (1976–1978)
- (United States) Patrick Doody (2011–2014)
- (United States) **Griffin Dorsey (2017–2018)**
- (United States) Mike Freitag (1976–1979)
- (United States) Nick Garcia (1998–1999)
- (United States) Ned Grabavoy (2001–2003)
- (United States) Jeremiah Gutjahr (2015–2018)
- (United States) **Andrew Gutman (2015–2018)**
- (United States) **Karsen Henderlong (2022–2023)**
- (Benin) Femi Hollinger-Janzen (2012–2015)
- (United States) Chris Klein (1994–1997)
- (Ukraine) Dema Kovalenko (1996–1998)
- (United States) **Grant Lillard (2014–2017)**
- (United States) Brian Maisonneuve (1991–1994)
- (United States) **Jack Maher (2018–2019)**
- (United States) **Dylan Mares (2013)**
- (United States) **Timmy Mehl (2015–2018)**
- (United States) Tommy Meyer (2008–2011)
- (United States) Drew Moor (2003–2004)
- (United States) **Aidan Morris (2019)**
- (United States) **Trey Muse (2017–2018)**
- (United States) **Lee Nguyen (2004–2005)**
- (United States) Jay Nolly (2000–2004)
- (United States) Pat Noonan (1999–2002)
- (United States) Danny O'Rourke (2001–2004)
- (United States) Austin Panchot (2015–2018)
- (United States) **Joshua Penn (2019)**
- (United States) Jacob Peterson (2003–2005)
- (United States) Caleb Porter (1994–1997)
- (United States) **Justin Rennicks (2017–2018)**
- (United States) Brad Ring (2005–2008)
- (United States) Ken Snow (1987–1990)
- (United States) Juergen Sommer (1987–1990)
- (United States) Gregg Thompson (1979–1982)
- (United States) Tanner Thompson (2013–2016)
- (United States) **Tommy Thompson (2013)**
- (United States) **Mason Toye (2017)**
- (United States) Todd Yeagley (1991–1994)
- (United States) **Eriq Zavaleta (2011–2012)**

Active professionals in bold

== Current coaching staff ==
As of August 5, 2026

Position	Name
Head coach	(United States) Todd Yeagley
Assistant coach	(United States) Christian Lomeli
Assistant coach	(United States) Tanner Thompson
Assistant coach	(United States) Jacob Bushue

== Coaching history ==
- Jerry Yeagley (1973–2003)
- Mike Freitag (2004–2009)
- Todd Yeagley (2010–present)

=== Yearly records ===
Season	Coach	Overall	Conference	Standing	Postseason
Jerry Yeagley (Big Ten Conference) (1973–2003)
1973	Jerry Yeagley	12–2–0			
1974	Jerry Yeagley	14–3–0			NCAA Regional Final
1975	Jerry Yeagley	13–3–1			
1976	Jerry Yeagley	18–1–1			NCAA Final
1977	Jerry Yeagley	12–2–1			NCAA regional semifinal
1978	Jerry Yeagley	23–2–0			NCAA Final
1979	Jerry Yeagley	19–2–2			NCAA Quarterfinals
1980	Jerry Yeagley	22–3–1			NCAA Final
1981	Jerry Yeagley	20–3–0			NCAA Quarterfinals
1982	Jerry Yeagley	21–3–1			NCAA Champions
1983	Jerry Yeagley	21–1–4			NCAA Champions
1984	Jerry Yeagley	22–2–2			NCAA Final
1985	Jerry Yeagley	12–9–1			NCAA Regional Final
1986	Jerry Yeagley	9–6–4			
1987	Jerry Yeagley	18–3–0			NCAA Regional Final
1988	Jerry Yeagley	19–3–3			NCAA Champions
1989	Jerry Yeagley	18–2–2			NCAA Semifinals
1990	Jerry Yeagley	16–4–2			NCAA Quarterfinals
1991	Jerry Yeagley	19–3–2	4–1–0	2nd	NCAA Semifinals
1992	Jerry Yeagley	14–6–4	3–1–1	2nd	NCAA Quarterfinals
1993	Jerry Yeagley	17–3–1	5–0–0	1st	NCAA Regional Final
1994	Jerry Yeagley	23–3–0	5–0–0	1st	NCAA Final
1995	Jerry Yeagley	14–5–2	3–2–0	3rd	NCAA regional semifinal
1996	Jerry Yeagley	15–3–3	4–0–1	1st	NCAA Quarterfinals
1997	Jerry Yeagley	23–1–0	5–0–0	1st	NCAA Semifinals
1998	Jerry Yeagley	23–2–0	5–0–0	1st	NCAA Champions
1999	Jerry Yeagley	21–3–0	5–0–0	1st	NCAA Champions
2000	Jerry Yeagley	16–7–0	6–0–0	1st	NCAA Semifinals
2001	Jerry Yeagley	18–4–1	6–0–0	1st	NCAA Final
2002	Jerry Yeagley	15–4–2	6–0–0	1st	NCAA 3rd Round
2003	Jerry Yeagley	17–3–5	5–0–1	1st	NCAA Champions
Jerry Yeagley:		544–102–45 (.820)	62–4–3 (.920)		
Mike Freitag (Big Ten Conference) (2004–2009)
2004	Mike Freitag	19–4–1	5–1–0	1st	NCAA Champions
2005	Mike Freitag	13–3–6	2–1–3	2nd	NCAA 2nd Round
2006	Mike Freitag	15–4–3	4–1–1	1st	NCAA 3rd Round
2007	Mike Freitag	13–4–5	4–0–2	1st	NCAA 2nd Round
2008	Mike Freitag	14–7–3	3–3–0	4th	NCAA Quarterfinals
2009	Mike Freitag	12–10–1	3–3–0	4th	NCAA 3rd Round
Mike Freitag:		86–32–19 (.697)	21–9–6 (.667)		
Todd Yeagley (Big Ten Conference) (2010–present)
2010	Todd Yeagley	10–8–2	4–1–1	1st	NCAA 3rd Round
2011	Todd Yeagley	13–4–5	3–1–2	4th	NCAA 3rd Round
2012	Todd Yeagley	16–5–3	3–2–1	3rd	NCAA Champions
2013	Todd Yeagley	8–12–2	2–4–0	5th	NCAA 1st Round
2014	Todd Yeagley	12–5–5	3–3–2	6th	NCAA 2nd Round
2015	Todd Yeagley	13–5–3	4–3–1	2nd	NCAA 3rd Round
2016	Todd Yeagley	12–2–7	3–0–5	2nd	NCAA 3rd Round
2017	Todd Yeagley	18–1–6	5–0–3	2nd	NCAA Final
2018	Todd Yeagley	20–3–1	8–0–0	1st	NCAA Semifinal
2019	Todd Yeagley	15–3–4	7–1–0	1st	NCAA 3rd Round
2020	Todd Yeagley	12–2–2	7–1–0	1st	NCAA Final
2021	Todd Yeagley	15–6–1	5–3–0	3rd	NCAA 3rd Round
2022	Todd Yeagley	14–4–7	3–1–4	4th	NCAA Final
2023	Todd Yeagley	15–4–5	4–2–2	T-1st	NCAA Quarterfinals
2024	Todd Yeagley	11–5–5	7–1–2	T-1st	NCAA 3rd Round
2025	Todd Yeagley	12–6–1	5–5–0	5th	NCAA 2nd Round
2026	Todd Yeagley	15–1–3	7–1–2	1st	
Todd Yeagley:		231–75–61 (.713)	80–29–25 (.690)		
Total:		861-210-125 (.772)			
National champion Postseason invitational champion Conference regular season champion Conference regular season and conference tournament champion Division regular season champion Division regular season and conference tournament champion Conference tournament champion

== Honors ==
- NCAA Division I Championship:
  - Winners (8): 1982, 1983, 1988, 1998, 1999, 2003, 2004, 2012
  - Runners-up (9): 1976, 1978, 1980, 1984, 1994, 2001, 2017, 2020, 2022
- Big Ten Conference tournament:
  - Winners (17): 1991, 1992, 1994, 1995, 1996, 1997, 1998, 1999, 2001, 2003, 2006, 2013, 2018, 2019, 2020, 2023, 2026
  - Runners-up (7): 2005, 2007, 2008, 2014, 2017, 2021, 2022
- Big Ten Conference Regular Season:
  - Winners (20): 1993, 1994, 1996, 1997, 1998, 1999, 2000, 2001, 2002, 2003, 2004, 2006, 2007, 2010, 2018, 2019, 2020, 2023, 2024, 2026
  - Runners-up (6): 1991, 1992, 2005, 2015, 2016, 2017
