= 2015 Big Ten Conference men's soccer season =

Big Ten Conference
- Season: 2015
- Champions: Maryland
- Premiers: Ohio State
- NCAA tournament: Ohio State; Indiana; Maryland; Rutgers

2015 Big Ten Conference men's soccer standings
	Conf.					Overall
Team	W		L		T	W		L		T
No. 14 Ohio State +	5	–	2	–	1	14	–	7	–	4
No. 19 Indiana +	4	–	3	–	1	13	–	5	–	3
No. 12 Maryland ‡	3	–	2	–	3	12	–	5	–	6
No. 23 Rutgers +	4	–	4	–	0	12	–	7	–	2
Northwestern	4	–	4	–	0	7	–	9	–	2
Michigan	3	–	3	–	2	8	–	6	–	4
Wisconsin	2	–	3	–	3	5	–	11	–	3
Penn State	2	–	4	–	2	7	–	8	–	3
Michigan St.	2	–	4	–	2	8	–	9	–	2
‡-Tournament champion +- Invited to the NCAA Division I Men's Soccer Championship; As of December 4, 2015; Rankings from NSCAA

The 2015 Big Ten Conference men's soccer season was the 25th season of men's varsity soccer in the conference. Maryland entered the season as both the regular season champion and the Big Ten tournament champion.

== Preseason ==
Defending regular season and tournament champions Maryland were selected as the favorite ahead of the 2015 season.

=== Preseason poll ===
Projected Rank	School	2014 Finish
1	Maryland	1st
2	Indiana	T-6th
3	Penn State	T-2nd
4	Michigan State	5th
5	Ohio State	T-2nd
6	Northwestern	T-2nd
7	Michigan	T-6th
8	Rutgers	8th
9	Wisconsin	9th

== Teams ==
=== Stadia and locations ===
Team	Location	Stadium	Capacity
Indiana Hoosiers	Bloomington, Indiana	Armstrong Stadium	6,000
Maryland Terrapins	College Park, Maryland	Ludwig Field	7,500
Michigan Wolverines	Ann Arbor, Michigan	U-M Soccer Stadium	2,200
Michigan State Spartans	East Lansing, Michigan	DeMartin Soccer Complex	2,500
Northwestern Wildcats	Evanston, Illinois	Lakeside Field	2,000
Ohio State Buckeyes	Columbus, Ohio	Owens Memorial Stadium	10,000
Penn State Nittany Lions	State College, Pennsylvania	Jeffrey Field	5,000
Rutgers Scarlet Knights	Piscataway, New Jersey	Yurcak Field	5,000
Wisconsin Badgers	Madison, Wisconsin	McClimon Stadium	2,000

- Illinois, Iowa, Minnesota, Nebraska and Purdue do not sponsor men's soccer

=== Personnel ===
Team	Head coach	Shirt supplier
Indiana	(United States) Todd Yeagley	(Germany) Adidas
Maryland	(North Macedonia) Sasho Cirovski	(United States) Under Armour
Michigan	(Canada) Chaka Daley	(Germany) Adidas
Michigan State	(United States) Damon Rensing	(United States) Nike
Northwestern	(United States) Tim Lenahan	(United States) Under Armour
Ohio State	(United States) John Bluem	(United States) Nike
Penn State	(United States) Bob Warming	(United States) Nike
Rutgers	(United States) Dan Donigan	(Germany) Adidas
Wisconsin	(United States) John Trask	(Germany) Adidas

== Regular season ==
=== Results ===
Home \ Away	IND	UMD	MIC	MSU	NOR	OSU	PSU	RUT	WIS
Indiana	—	—	1–0	—	—	0–1	—	1–4	1–0
Maryland	0–0	—	0–0	—	1–2	0–1	—	3–1	—
Michigan	—	—	—	1–0	3–0	1–3	—	0–1	3–3
Michigan State	1–4	0–0	—	—	—	2–1	2–1	—	—
Northwestern	0–1	—	—	1–0	—	2–1	—	2–4	—
Ohio State	1–0	1–0	3–1	2–1	1–2	—	1–1	0–1	2–0
Penn State	1–0	3–4	2–0	—	1–2	1–1	—	—	—
Rutgers	—	—	—	1–3	—	1–0	0–2	—	0–1
Wisconsin	—	1–4	—	0–0	2–1	0–2	2–2	—	—

Source: Team Statistics
Legend: Blue = home team win; Yellow = draw; Red = away team win.

=== Rankings ===
Legend
Increase in ranking
Decrease in ranking

		Pre	Wk 1	Wk 2	Wk 3	Wk 4	Wk 5	Wk 6	Wk 7	Wk 8	Wk 9	Wk 10	Wk 11	Wk 12	Final
Indiana	C	14	18	10	22	RV	RV	RV	RV	RV	RV	RV	22	19	16
Maryland	C	13	6	4	10	11	13	25	18	20	RV	RV	RV	12	7
Michigan	C														
Michigan State	C	9	22	RV	RV	RV	NR								
Northwestern	C														
Ohio State	C	RV	RV	NR					RV	18	23	18	12	14	14
Penn State	C	23	25	NR	13	21	NR								
Rutgers	C										21	16	18	23	25
Wisconsin	C														

== Postseason ==
=== Big Ten tournament ===
Semifinals
1	Ohio State	4
4	Rutgers	0
3	Maryland (pen.)	1 (3)
2	Indiana	1 (2)

Final
1	Ohio State	0
3	Maryland	2

=== NCAA tournament ===
Seed	Region	School	1st round	2nd round	3rd round	Quarterfinals
9	1	Ohio State	BYE	T, 1–1 ^{W, 4–3 pen.} vs. Dayton – (Columbus)	L, 1–3 vs. Stanford – (Stanford)	
10	4	Maryland	BYE	W 1–0 vs. Charlotte – (College Park)	W 2–1 vs. Notre Dame – (Notre Dame)	T, 1–1 ^{L, 1–3 pen.} vs. Clemson – (Clemson)
16	1	Indiana	BYE	W 1–0 vs. Connecticut – (Bloomington)	L, 0–1 vs. Wake Forest – (Winston-Salem)	
—	2	Rutgers	T, 1–1 ^{W, 3–2 pen.} vs. LIU Brooklyn – (Piscataway)	L, 1–6 vs. Akron – (Akron)		

== See also ==
- Big Ten Conference
- 2015 Big Ten Conference Men's Soccer Tournament
- 2015 NCAA Division I men's soccer season
- 2015 in American soccer
