= 2015 Maryland Terrapins men's soccer team =

American college soccer season

2015 Maryland Terrapins men's soccer

Big Ten Tournament Champions

NCAA Tournament, Quarterfinals
- Conference: Big Ten Conference
- Record: 12–5–6 (3–2–3 B1G)
- Head coach: Sasho Cirovski (23rd season)
- Home stadium: Ludwig Field

2015 Big Ten Conference men's soccer standings
	Conf.					Overall
Team	W		L		T	W		L		T
No. 14 Ohio State +	5	–	2	–	1	14	–	7	–	4
No. 19 Indiana +	4	–	3	–	1	13	–	5	–	3
No. 12 Maryland ‡	3	–	2	–	3	12	–	5	–	6
No. 23 Rutgers +	4	–	4	–	0	12	–	7	–	2
Northwestern	4	–	4	–	0	7	–	9	–	2
Michigan	3	–	3	–	2	8	–	6	–	4
Wisconsin	2	–	3	–	3	5	–	11	–	3
Penn State	2	–	4	–	2	7	–	8	–	3
Michigan St.	2	–	4	–	2	8	–	9	–	2
‡-Tournament champion +- Invited to the NCAA Division I Men's Soccer Championship; As of December 4, 2015; Rankings from NSCAA

The 2015 Maryland Terrapins men's soccer team was the college's 70th season of playing organized men's college soccer. It was the Terrapins' second season playing in the Big Ten Conference.

== Background ==
The 2014 regular season was Maryland's first in the Big Ten. They won both the regular season and the 2014 Big Ten Tournament. Maryland lost in the second round of the NCAA Tournament to UMBC.

== Roster ==
Note: Flags indicate national team as defined under FIFA eligibility rules; some limited exceptions apply. Players may hold more than one non-FIFA nationality.

No.	Pos.	Nation	Player
1	GK	USA	Cody Niedermeier
2	DF	USA	Alex Crognale
3	MF	USA	Michael Sauers
4	DF	BRA	Ivan Magalhães
5	MF	USA	Suli Dainkeh
6	MF	USA	George Campbell
7	MF	USA	Connor Smith
8	MF	USA	Mael Corboz
9	FW	USA	Sebastian Elney
10	MF	JPN	Tsubasa Endoh
11	MF	BIH	Amar Sejdič
12	FW	USA	DJ Reeves
13	MF	USA	Andrew Samuels

No.	Pos.	Nation	Player
14	DF	SWE	Christoffer Wallajnder-Ianev
15	MF	USA	Jake Areman
16	MF	HUN	David Kabelik
17	MF	USA	Jorge Calix
18	DF	USA	Dakota Edwards
19	FW	USA	Eryk Williamson
20	FW	KOR	Paul Bin
21	DF	USA	Aaron Franco
22	DF	ARG	Diego Silva
25	MF	USA	Cody Albrecht
26	DF	USA	Emmanuel Korvah
28	MF	USA	Chris Odoi-Atsem
99	GK	CAN	Dayne St. Clair

== Schedule ==
Date Time, TV	Rank^{#}	Opponent^{#}	Result	Record	Site (Attendance) City, State
Preseason
08/15/15*	No. 12	Loyola	W 1–0		Ludwig Field
08/18/15*	No. 12	Bucknell	L 0–1		Ludwig Field
08/22/15*	No. 12	Providence	W 3–1		Ludwig Field
Regular season
08/28/15*; 5:00 pm, BTN2Go	No. 12	vs. No. 4 Notre Dame adidas/IU Credit Union Classic	T 0–0 ^{2OT}	0–0–1	Bill Armstrong Stadium (3,273); Bloomington, IN
08/30/15*; 11:30 am, BTN	No. 12	vs. St. John's adidas/IU Credit Union Classic	W 4–0	1–0–1	Bill Armstrong Stadium (4,226); Bloomington, IN
09/4/15*; 7:00 pm, BTN	No. 6	No. 1 UCLA	W 2–1 ^{OT}	2–0–1	Ludwig Field (8,449); College Park, MD
09/7/15*; 7:00 pm, BTN	No. 6	Akron	L 2–3	2–1–1	Ludwig Field (4,003); College Park, MD
09/11/15; 7:00 pm, BTN	No. 4	Michigan	T 0–0 ^{2OT}	2–1–2 (0–0–1)	Ludwig Field (6,294); College Park, MD
09/14/15*; 7:00 pm, BTN2Go	No. 4	Navy	W 1–0	3–1–2	Ludwig Field (1,611); College Park, MD
09/18/15	No. 8	at No. 20 Michigan State	T 0–0 ^{2OT}	3–1–3 (0–0–2)	DeMartin Soccer Complex (1,280); East Lansing, MI
09/23/15*	No. 11	at No. 25 Georgetown	L 1–2	3–2–3	Shaw Field (891); Washington, DC
09/27/15	No. 11	at Wisconsin	W 4–1	4–2–3 (1–0–2)	McClimon Stadium (1,937); Madison, WI
10/02/15	No. 13	Northwestern	L 1–2 ^{OT}	4–3–3 (1–1–2)	Ludwig Field (1,563); College Park, MD
10/05/15*	No. 13	Villanova	W 2–0	5–3–3	Ludwig Field (1,007); College Park, MD
10/09/15	No. 25	at Penn State	W 4–3	6–3–3 (2–1–2)	Jeffrey Field (1,785); University Park, PA
10/16/15	No. 18	Indiana	T 0–0 ^{2OT}	6–3–4 (2–1–3)	Ludwig Field (5,051); College Park, MD
10/20/15*	No. 20	Delaware	L 1–2	6–4–4	Ludwig Field (1,439); College Park, MD
10/23/15*	No. 20	No. 17 Washington	W 1–0	7–4–4	Ludwig Field (3,344); College Park, MD
10/31/15		at No. 23 Ohio State	L 0–1	7–5–4 (2–2–3)	Jesse Owens Memorial Stadium (743); Columbus, OH
11/4/15		No. 16 Rutgers	W 3–1	8–5–4 (3–2–3)	Ludwig Field (2,042); College Park, MD
Big Ten Tournament
11/8/15		Michigan; Quarterfinal	W 5–2	9–5–4	Ludwig Field (903); College Park, MD
11/13/15		vs. No. 22 Indiana; Semifinal	T 1–1 (3–2) ^{2OT}	9–5–5	Jesse Owens Memorial Stadium (628); Columbus, OH
11/15/15		at No. 12 Ohio State; Championship	W 2–0	10–5–5	Jesse Owens Memorial Stadium (1,120); Columbus, OH
NCAA Tournament
11/22/15*	No. 10	Virginia; First Round/Rivalry	W 1–0	11–5–5	Ludwig Field (2,737); College Park, MD
11/29/15*	No. 10	at No. 7 Notre Dame; Second Round	W 2–1	12–5–5	Sandra D. Thompson Field (331); South Bend, IN
12/4/15*	No. 10	at No. 2 Clemson; Quarterfinal	T 1–1 (1–3) ^{2OT}	12–5–6	Riggs Field (3,411); Clemson, SC
*Non-conference game. ^{#}Rankings from United Soccer Coaches. (#) Tournament seedings in parentheses.

== See also ==
- 2015 Big Ten Conference men's soccer season
- 2015 Big Ten Conference Men's Soccer Tournament
- 2015 NCAA Division I Men's Soccer Championship
