= 2014 Penn State Nittany Lions men's soccer team =

Penn State Nittany Lions
2014 season
- Head Coach: Bob Warming
- Stadium: Jeffrey Field
- Big Ten: 4th (5–3–0)
- Big Ten Tournament: Quarterfinals
- NCAA Tournament: 2nd round
Home colors	Away colors

2014 Big Ten Conference men's soccer standings
	Conf.					Overall
Team	W		L		T	W		L		T
No. 19 Maryland ‡	5	–	2	–	1	13	–	6	–	3
Ohio State +	5	–	3	–	0	9	–	8	–	5
Northwestern +	4	–	1	–	3	9	–	4	–	6
No. 23 Penn State +	5	–	3	–	0	13	–	6	–	1
No. 8 Michigan St. +	4	–	2	–	2	12	–	5	–	6
No. 17 Indiana +	3	–	3	–	2	12	–	5	–	5
Michigan	3	–	3	–	2	6	–	9	–	3
Rutgers	1	–	6	–	1	6	–	12	–	1
Wisconsin	0	–	7	–	1	3	–	12	–	3
‡ - Tournament champion +- Invited to the NCAA Division I Men's Soccer Championship; As of December 16, 2014; Rankings from NSCAA

The 2014 Penn State Nittany Lions men's soccer team was the college's 104th season of playing organized men's college soccer. The Nittany Lions entered the season as the defending Big Ten regular season champions

== Background ==
Penn State began the 2014 season as the two time defending regular season champions. They also lost in the semifinal of the Big Ten Tournament to Indiana, and lost in the third round of the NCAA Tournament to New Mexico.

== Roster ==
Note: Flags indicate national team as defined under FIFA eligibility rules; some limited exceptions apply. Players may hold more than one non-FIFA nationality.

No.	Pos.	Nation	Player
1	GK	USA	Andrew Wolverton
2	DF	USA	Matt Mayewski
3	DF	USA	Nate Lee
4	DF	USA	Eli Dennis
5	FW	USA	Connor Maloney
6	MF	USA	Kyle MacDonald
7	MF	USA	Christian Kaschak
8	MF	USA	Mason Kierks
9	FW	CAN	Mark Wadid
10	FW	USA	Mikey Minutillo
11	MF	USA	Shane Kronick
12	MF	USA	Owen Griffith
13	DF	USA	Mike Robinson

No.	Pos.	Nation	Player
14	MF	USA	Brandon Savino
15	MF	USA	Michael Gonzalez
16	DF	USA	Brett Gravatt
17	MF	USA	Brian James
18	DF	ISR	Dani Marks
19	DF	USA	Ryan Gallagher
20	MF	USA	Drew Klingenberg
21	MF	USA	Noah Pilato
22	DF	USA	Jake Garrigan
23	FW	USA	Riley Grant
24	DF	USA	Randy Falk
27	GK	USA	Danny Sheerin
40	GK	USA	Evan Finney

== Competitions ==
=== Regular season ===
==== Big Ten Standings ====
Team	Conference								Overall						
Team	Pld	W	L	T	GF	GA	GD	Pts	Pld	W	L	T	GF	GA	GD
Maryland	8	5	2	1	15	8	+7	16	22	13	6	3	35	19	+16
Ohio State	8	5	3	0	14	8	+6	15	22	9	8	5	28	22	+6
Northwestern	8	4	1	3	11	7	+4	15	19	9	4	6	22	12	+10
Penn State	8	5	3	0	7	9	–2	15	20	13	6	1	29	18	+11
Michigan State	8	4	2	2	13	10	+3	14	23	12	5	6	31	19	+12
Indiana	8	3	3	2	13	12	+1	11	22	12	5	5	35	22	+13
Michigan	8	3	3	2	11	10	+1	11	18	6	9	3	20	23	–3
Rutgers	8	1	6	1	7	17	–10	4	19	6	12	1	23	36	–13
Wisconsin	8	0	7	1	7	17	–10	1	18	3	12	3	20	34	–14

==== Match results ====
August 29 1	Penn State	1–0	Oakland	State College, Pennsylvania
8:00 pm ET		Report		Stadium: Jeffrey Field; Attendance: 3,223

August 31 2	Penn State	3–0	St. John's	State College, Pennsylvania
7:00 pm ET		Report		Stadium: Jeffrey Field; Attendance: 2,721

September 5 3	Penn State	1–0	Temple	State College, Pennsylvania
7:00 pm ET		Report		Stadium: Jeffrey Field; Attendance: 4,052

September 8 4	James Madison	1–1	Penn State	Harrisonburg, Virginia
5:00 pm ET		Report		Stadium: James Madison Soccer Complex; Attendance: 452

September 13 5	Indiana	0–1	Penn State	Bloomington, Indiana
7:30 pm ET		Report		Stadium: Armstrong Stadium; Attendance: 3,205

September 16 6	Penn State	3–0	St. Francis	State College, Pennsylvania
7:00 pm ET		Report		Stadium: Jeffrey Field; Attendance: 692

September 21 7	Penn State	1–0	Ohio State	State College, Pennsylvania
1:00 pm ET		Report		Stadium: Jeffrey Field; Attendance: 1,942

September 24 8	Penn State	6–2	Penn	State College, Pennsylvania
7:00 pm ET		Report		Stadium: Jeffrey Field; Attendance: 853

September 28 9	Michigan	0–1	Penn State	Ann Arbor, Michigan
1:00 pm ET		Report		Stadium: U-M Soccer Stadium; Attendance: 1,738

October 1 10	Bucknell	0–2	Penn State	Lewisburg, Pennsylvania
7:00 pm ET		Report		Stadium: Emmitt Field at Holmes Stadium; Attendance: 1,510

October 4 11	Penn State	1–0	Rutgers	State College, Pennsylvania
7:00 pm ET		Report		Stadium: Jeffrey Field; Attendance: 2,532

October 12 12	Maryland	4–0	Penn State	College Park, Maryland
1:00 pm ET		Report		Stadium: Ludwig Field; Attendance: 2,502

October 18 13	Penn State	0–2	Michigan State	State College, Pennsylvania
7:00 pm ET		Report		Stadium: Jeffrey Field

October 22 14	Penn State	1–2	West Virginia	State College, Pennsylvania
7:00 pm ET		Report		Stadium: Jeffrey Field; Attendance: 606

October 26 15	Penn State	2–1	Wisconsin	State College, Pennsylvania
2:00 pm ET		Report		Stadium: Jeffrey Field; Attendance: 1,638

November 2 16	Northwestern	2–1	Penn State	Evanston, Illinois
2:00 pm ET		Report		Stadium: Lakeside Field; Attendance: 762

November 5 17	Penn State	1–0	Akron	State College, Pennsylvania
7:00 pm ET		Report		Stadium: Jeffrey Field; Attendance: 809

=== Big Ten Tournament ===
November 9 QF	Penn State	0–1	Michigan State	State College, Pennsylvania
1:00 pm ET		Report		Stadium: Jeffrey Field; Attendance: 849

=== NCAA Tournament ===
November 20 1st round	Penn State	2–1	Hartwick	State College, Pennsylvania
7:00 pm ET		Report		Stadium: Jeffrey Field; Attendance: 377

November 23 2nd round	Syracuse	2–1	Penn State	Syracuse, New York
2:00 pm ET		Report		Stadium: SU Soccer Stadium; Attendance: 1,213

== Transfers ==
=== Out ===
No.	Pos.	Player	Transferred to	Fee/notes	Date	Source
8	MF	(United States) Grant Warming	(United States) Des Moines Menace	Graduated	December 31, 2013	
10	FW	(United States) Mikey Minutillo	(United States) IMG Academy Bradenton	Graduated	December 31, 2013	
16	DF	(United States) Akil Howard		Graduated	December 31, 2013	
22	DF	(Germany) Martin Seiler		Graduated	December 31, 2013	
28	GK	(United States) Micah Collins		Graduated	December 31, 2013	

== See also ==
- 2014 Big Ten Conference men's soccer season
- 2014 Big Ten Conference Men's Soccer Tournament
- 2014 NCAA Division I Men's Soccer Championship
