= 2014 Northwestern Wildcats men's soccer team =

Northwestern Wildcats
2014 season
- Head Coach: Tim Lenahan
- Stadium: Lakeside Field
- Big Ten: 3rd (4–1–3)
- Big Ten Tournament: Quarterfinals
- NCAA Tournament: 1st round
Home colors	Away colors

2014 Big Ten Conference men's soccer standings
	Conf.					Overall
Team	W		L		T	W		L		T
No. 19 Maryland ‡	5	–	2	–	1	13	–	6	–	3
Ohio State +	5	–	3	–	0	9	–	8	–	5
Northwestern +	4	–	1	–	3	9	–	4	–	6
No. 23 Penn State +	5	–	3	–	0	13	–	6	–	1
No. 8 Michigan St. +	4	–	2	–	2	12	–	5	–	6
No. 17 Indiana +	3	–	3	–	2	12	–	5	–	5
Michigan	3	–	3	–	2	6	–	9	–	3
Rutgers	1	–	6	–	1	6	–	12	–	1
Wisconsin	0	–	7	–	1	3	–	12	–	3
‡ - Tournament champion +- Invited to the NCAA Division I Men's Soccer Championship; As of December 16, 2014; Rankings from NSCAA

The 2014 Northwestern Wildcats men's soccer team was the college's 35th season of playing organized men's college soccer.

== Background ==
In the 2013 season, Northwestern finished at the bottom of the conference standings. Despite this, the team won their first Big Ten Tournament game against Wisconsin before losing to Michigan State in the semifinal. Northwestern would go on to lose in the first round of the NCAA tournament against Bradley.

== Roster ==
Note: Flags indicate national team as defined under FIFA eligibility rules; some limited exceptions apply. Players may hold more than one non-FIFA nationality.

No.	Pos.	Nation	Player
00	GK	USA	Zak Allen
1	GK	USA	Tyler Miller
4	DF	USA	Nathan Dearth
5	DF	NZL	Nikko Boxall
6	MF	NZL	Riley Kelliher
7	MF	USA	Sam Forsgren
8	DF	USA	Sagar Jambusaria
9	FW	USA	Elo Ozumba
10	FW	USA	Joey Calistri
11	MF	USA	Eric Weberman
12	FW	USA	Peter Horner
13	MF	USA	Connor Holloway
14	DF	USA	Henry Herrill

No.	Pos.	Nation	Player
15	MF	USA	Cole Missimo
16	FW	USA	Mike Roberge
17	MF	USA	Nati Schnitman
18	DF	USA	Mick Maley
19	MF	USA	Jeffrey Hopson
20	MF	USA	Brandon Medina
21	FW	USA	John Moderwell
22	GK	USA	Brendan Gruenwald-Schmitz
23	FW	USA	Getenet Tuji
24	MF	USA	Drew Rosenberg
25	DF	USA	Drew Beasley
26	DF	USA	Grant Wilson
27	GK	USA	Francisco Tomasino

== Competitions ==
=== Preseason ===
August 16	South Jersey All-Stars	1–4	Northwestern	Pomona, New Jersey
3:00 pm CT		Report		Stadium: G. Larry James Stadium

August 19	Fairleigh Dickinson	0–1	Northwestern	Hackensack, New Jersey
11:00 am CT		Report		Stadium: University Stadium

August 22	St. John's	0–0	Northwestern	Pomona, New Jersey
6:30 pm CT		Report		Stadium: G. Larry James Stadium

=== Regular season ===
==== Big Ten Standings ====
Team	Conference								Overall						
Team	Pld	W	L	T	GF	GA	GD	Pts	Pld	W	L	T	GF	GA	GD
Maryland	8	5	2	1	15	8	+7	16	22	13	6	3	35	19	+16
Ohio State	8	5	3	0	14	8	+6	15	22	9	8	5	28	22	+6
Northwestern	8	4	1	3	11	7	+4	15	19	9	4	6	22	12	+10
Penn State	8	5	3	0	7	9	–2	15	20	13	6	1	29	18	+11
Michigan State	8	4	2	2	13	10	+3	14	23	12	5	6	31	19	+12
Indiana	8	3	3	2	13	12	+1	11	22	12	5	5	35	22	+13
Michigan	8	3	3	2	11	10	+1	11	18	6	9	3	20	23	–3
Rutgers	8	1	6	1	7	17	–10	4	19	6	12	1	23	36	–13
Wisconsin	8	0	7	1	7	17	–10	1	18	3	12	3	20	34	–14

==== Match results ====
August 29 1	Northwestern	2–0	Quinnipiac	Evanston, Illinois
7:40 pm CT		Report		Stadium: Lakeside Field; Attendance: 314; Referee: Alex Beeler

August 31 2	Northwestern	3–0	Hofstra	Evanston, Illinois
1:45 pm CT		Report		Stadium: Lakeside Field; Attendance: 447; Referee: Edwin Jurisevic

September 5 3	UCSB	1–1	Northwestern	Santa Barbara, California
9:05 pm CT		Report		Stadium: Harder Stadium; Attendance: 1605; Referee: Rene Nunez

September 7 4	Cal State Fullerton	0–0	Northwestern	Santa Barbara, California
2:00 pm CT		Report		Stadium: Harder Stadium; Attendance: 67; Referee: Ramon Hernandez

September 14 5	Ohio State	2–0	Northwestern	Columbus, Ohio
12:04 pm CT		Report		Stadium: Jesse Owens Memorial Stadium; Attendance: 748; Referee: Mark Kadlecik

September 17 6	Northwestern	1–0	Valpariso	Evanston, Illinois
9:30 pm CT		Report		Stadium: Lakeside Field; Attendance: 2151; Referee: Keith Angel

September 21 7	Northwestern	0–0	Michigan	Evanston, Illinois
4:00 pm CT		Report		Stadium: Lakeside Field; Attendance: 754; Referee: Jorge Cuate

September 24 8	Northwestern	1–0	DePaul	Evanston, Illinois
7:00 pm CT		Report		Stadium: Lakeside Field; Attendance: 854; Referee: Pawel Wydra

September 28 9	Indiana	1–1	Northwestern	Bloomington, Indiana
1:45 pm CT		Report		Stadium: Armstrong Stadium; Attendance: 1966; Referee: Mark Kadlecik

October 5 10	Northwestern	3–2	Maryland	Evanston, Illinois
12:00 pm CT		Report		Stadium: Lakeside Field; Attendance: 1012; Referee: Cesar Ibarra

October 8 11	Northern Illinois	0–2	Northwestern	DeKalb, Illinois
7:00 pm CT		Report		Stadium: NIU Soccer Complex; Attendance: 316; Referee: Jorge Cuate

October 14 12	Notre Dame	1–0	Northwestern	Notre Dame, Indiana
6:00 pm CT		Report		Stadium: Alumni Stadium; Attendance: 761; Referee: Pawel Wydra

October 18 13	Rutgers	0–2	Northwestern	Piscataway, New Jersey
6:00 pm CT		Report		Stadium: Yurcak Field; Attendance: 554; Referee: Cesar Ibarra

October 26 14	Michigan State	1–1	Northwestern	East Lansing, Michigan
12:00 pm CT		Report		Stadium: DeMartin Stadium; Attendance: 1007; Referee: Jorge Cuate

October 29 15	Loyola	1–0	Northwestern	Chicago, Illinois
7:00 pm CT		Report		Stadium: Loyola Soccer Park; Attendance: 423; Referee: Greg Dopka

November 2 16	Northwestern	2–1	Penn State	Evanston, Illinois
1:00 pm CT		Report		Stadium: Lakeside Field; Attendance: 762; Referee: Abbey Okulaja

November 5 17	Northwestern	2–0	Wisconsin	Evanston, Illinois
7:00 pm CT		Report		Stadium: Lakeside Field; Attendance: 479

=== Big Ten Tournament ===
November 9 QF	Northwestern	1–1 (a.e.t.) (4–5 p)	Indiana	Evanston, Illinois
12:00 p.m. CT		Report		Stadium: Lakeside Field; Attendance: 624; Referee: Cesar Ibarra

=== NCAA Tournament ===
November 20 1st round	Northwestern	0–1	SIU Edwardsville	Evanston, Illinois
4:30 pm CT		Report		Stadium: Lakeside Field; Attendance: 255; Referee: Dimitar Chavdarov

== See also ==
- 2014 Big Ten Conference men's soccer season
- 2014 Big Ten Conference Men's Soccer Tournament
- 2014 NCAA Division I Men's Soccer Championship
