= 2014 Maryland Terrapins men's soccer team =

Association football team season

2014 Maryland Terrapins men's soccer

Big Ten regular season and tournament champions

NCAA Tournament, Second Round
- Conference: Big Ten Conference
- Record: 13–6–3 (5–2–1 B1G)
- Head coach: Sasho Cirovski (22nd season)
- Home stadium: Ludwig Field

2014 Big Ten Conference men's soccer standings
	Conf.					Overall
Team	W		L		T	W		L		T
No. 19 Maryland ‡	5	–	2	–	1	13	–	6	–	3
Ohio State +	5	–	3	–	0	9	–	8	–	5
Northwestern +	4	–	1	–	3	9	–	4	–	6
No. 23 Penn State +	5	–	3	–	0	13	–	6	–	1
No. 8 Michigan St. +	4	–	2	–	2	12	–	5	–	6
No. 17 Indiana +	3	–	3	–	2	12	–	5	–	5
Michigan	3	–	3	–	2	6	–	9	–	3
Rutgers	1	–	6	–	1	6	–	12	–	1
Wisconsin	0	–	7	–	1	3	–	12	–	3
‡ - Tournament champion +- Invited to the NCAA Division I Men's Soccer Championship; As of December 16, 2014; Rankings from NSCAA

The 2014 Maryland Terrapins men's soccer team was the college's 69th season of playing organized men's college soccer, and the school's first in the Big Ten Conference.

== Background ==
Prior to the 2014 season, the Big Ten Conference added two new members, the University of Maryland and Rutgers University, as a part of a major conference realignment. In the 2013 season, Maryland made it all the way to the College Cup final, losing to Notre Dame.

== Roster ==
Note: Flags indicate national team as defined under FIFA eligibility rules; some limited exceptions apply. Players may hold more than one non-FIFA nationality.

No.	Pos.	Nation	Player
2	DF	USA	Alex Crognale
3	MF	USA	Michael Sauers
4	DF	USA	Kyle Roach
5	DF	USA	Mikey Ambrose
6	MF	USA	George Campbell
7	MF	USA	Dan Metzger
8	MF	USA	Mael Corboz
9	MF	USA	Alex Shinsky
11	MF	ETH	Mikias Eticha
12	MF	USA	Jereme Raley
13	FW	USA	Eric Carbajal
14	DF	SWE	Christoffer Wallajnder-Ianev

No.	Pos.	Nation	Player
15	MF	USA	Jake Areman
16	MF	HUN	David Kabelik
18	DF	USA	Dakota Edwards
19	GK	USA	Cody Niedermeier
21	GK	USA	Jordan Tatum
22	MF	USA	Suli Dainkeh
23	FW	NED	Jeroen Meefout
24	MF	USA	Daniel Johnson
25	FW	USA	Ryan Reid
26	MF	USA	Chris Odoi-Atsem
31	MF	JPN	Tsubasa Endoh
99	GK	USA	Zack Steffen

== Competitions ==
=== Preseason exhibitions ===
August 18	Akron	0–3	Maryland	Akron, Ohio
7:00 pm ET

August 23	Maryland	1–2	Delaware	College Park, Maryland
7:00 pm ET				Stadium: Ludwig Field

=== Regular season ===
==== Big Ten Standings ====
Team	Conference								Overall						
Team	Pld	W	L	T	GF	GA	GD	Pts	Pld	W	L	T	GF	GA	GD
Maryland	8	5	2	1	15	8	+7	16	22	13	6	3	35	19	+16
Ohio State	8	5	3	0	14	8	+6	15	22	9	8	5	28	22	+6
Northwestern	8	4	1	3	11	7	+4	15	19	9	4	6	22	12	+10
Penn State	8	5	3	0	7	9	–2	15	20	13	6	1	29	18	+11
Michigan State	8	4	2	2	13	10	+3	14	23	12	5	6	31	19	+12
Indiana	8	3	3	2	13	12	+1	11	22	12	5	5	35	22	+13
Michigan	8	3	3	2	11	10	+1	11	18	6	9	3	20	23	–3
Rutgers	8	1	6	1	7	17	–10	4	19	6	12	1	23	36	–13
Wisconsin	8	0	7	1	7	17	–10	1	18	3	12	3	20	34	–14

==== Match results ====
August 29 1	Louisville	1–0	Maryland	Louisville, Kentucky
7:00 pm ET		Report		Stadium: Cardinal Park Soccer and Track Stadium

September 1 2	Maryland	3–2	Coastal Carolina	College Park, Maryland
7:00 pm ET		Report		Stadium: Ludwig Field

September 5 3	Maryland	0–0 (a.e.t.)	UMBC	College Park, Maryland
7:30 pm ET		Report		Stadium: Ludwig Field

September 8 4	Navy	2–1	Maryland	Annapolis, Maryland
7:00 pm ET		Report		Stadium: Glenn Warner Soccer Facility

September 12 5	Michigan	1–1 (a.e.t.)	Maryland	Ann Arbor, Michigan
5:00 pm ET		Report		Stadium: U-M Soccer Stadium

September 19 6	Maryland	0–1	Michigan State	College Park, Maryland
7:00 pm ET		Report		Stadium: Ludwig Field

September 22 7	Maryland	1–0	Dayton	College Park, Maryland
7:00 pm ET		Report		Stadium: Ludwig Field

September 26 8	Maryland	2–0	Wisconsin	College Park, Maryland
7:30 pm ET		Report		Stadium: Ludwig Field

September 30 9	Maryland	0–1	Georgetown	College Park, Maryland
7:00 pm ET		Report		Stadium: Ludwig Field

October 5 10	Northwestern	2–3 (a.e.t.)	Maryland	Evanston, Illinois
1:00 pm ET		Report		Stadium: Valley Field

October 8 11	Maryland	1–0	VCU	College Park, Maryland
7:00 pm ET		Report		Stadium: Ludwig Field

October 12 12	Maryland	4–0	Penn State	College Park, Maryland
7:00 pm ET		Report		Stadium: Ludwig Field

October 15 13	Maryland	2–0	Lehigh	College Park, Maryland
7:00 pm ET		Report		Stadium: Ludwig Field

October 19 14	Indiana	1–2	Maryland	Bloomington, Indiana
7:00 pm ET		Report		Stadium: Armstrong Field

October 25 15	Maryland	2–0	Santa Clara	College Park, Maryland
7:00 pm ET		Report		Stadium: Ludwig Field

October 28 16	Maryland	5–2	Hartwick	College Park, Maryland
7:00 pm ET		Report		Stadium: Ludwig Field

November 1 17	Maryland	1–0	Ohio State	College Park, Maryland
7:00 pm ET		Report		Stadium: Ludwig Field

November 5 18	Rutgers	2–3	Maryland	New Brunswick, New Jersey
7:00 pm ET		Report		Stadium: Yurcak Field

=== Big Ten Tournament ===
November 9 QF	Maryland	2–0	Rutgers	College Park, Maryland
1:00 p.m. EST		Report		Stadium: Ludwig Field

November 14 SF	Maryland	0–0 (a.e.t.) (3–2 p)	Michigan State	College Park, Maryland
3:40 p.m. EST		Report		Stadium: Ludwig Field

November 16 F	Maryland	2–1	Indiana	College Park, Maryland
12:30 p.m. EST		Report		Stadium: Ludwig Field

=== NCAA Tournament ===
November 23 2nd round	Maryland	0–1	UMBC	College Park, Maryland
5:00 EST		Report	Harris 70'	Stadium: Ludwig Field; Attendance: 3,776; Referee: Mark Kadlecik

== Transfers ==
=== Out ===
No.	Pos.	Player	Transferred to	Fee/notes	Date	Source
6	MF	(Norway) Helge Leikvang		Graduated	December 31, 2013	
8	MF	(Haiti) Widner Saint Cyr		Graduated	December 31, 2013	
20	FW	(United States) Jake Pace		Graduated	December 31, 2013	
29	DF	(New Zealand) Gordon Murie		Graduated	December 31, 2013	
15	FW	(United States) Patrick Mullins	(United States) New England Revolution	Selected in the 2014 MLS SuperDraft	January 16, 2014	
23	MF	(Zimbabwe) Schillo Tshuma	(United States) Portland Timbers	Selected in the 2014 MLS SuperDraft	January 16, 2014	
10	MF	(Lesotho) Sunny Jane	(United States) Wilmington Hammerheads	Graduated, signed professional contract	February 25, 2014	
