= 2014 Big Ten Conference men's soccer season =

Big Ten Conference
- Season: 2014
- Champions: Maryland
- Premiers: Maryland
- NCAA Tournament: Indiana; Maryland; Michigan State; Northwestern; Ohio State; Penn State

2014 Big Ten Conference men's soccer standings
	Conf.					Overall
Team	W		L		T	W		L		T
No. 19 Maryland ‡	5	–	2	–	1	13	–	6	–	3
Ohio State +	5	–	3	–	0	9	–	8	–	5
Northwestern +	4	–	1	–	3	9	–	4	–	6
No. 23 Penn State +	5	–	3	–	0	13	–	6	–	1
No. 8 Michigan St. +	4	–	2	–	2	12	–	5	–	6
No. 17 Indiana +	3	–	3	–	2	12	–	5	–	5
Michigan	3	–	3	–	2	6	–	9	–	3
Rutgers	1	–	6	–	1	6	–	12	–	1
Wisconsin	0	–	7	–	1	3	–	12	–	3
‡ - Tournament champion +- Invited to the NCAA Division I Men's Soccer Championship; As of December 16, 2014; Rankings from NSCAA

The 2014 Big Ten Conference men's soccer season was the 24th season of men's varsity soccer in the conference.

Penn State Nittany Lions were the two-time defending regular season champions, while the Indiana Hoosiers were the defending tournament champions.

== Changes from 2013 ==
Rutgers and Maryland joined the conference from the American Athletic Conference and Atlantic Coast Conference respectively.

== Preseason ==
Newcomers Maryland was picked to win the conference ahead of Penn State.

=== Preseason poll ===
Projected Rank	School	2013 Finish
1	Maryland	2nd (Atlantic Coast Conference)
2	Michigan State	3rd
3	Michigan	4th
4	Penn State	1st
5	Indiana	5th
6	Northwestern	7th
7	Wisconsin	2nd
8	Rutgers	8th (American Athletic Conference)
9	Ohio State	6th

== Teams ==
=== Stadia and locations ===
Team	Location	Stadium	Capacity
Indiana Hoosiers	Bloomington, Indiana	Armstrong Stadium	6,000
Maryland Terrapins	College Park, Maryland	Ludwig Field	7,500
Michigan Wolverines	Ann Arbor, Michigan	U-M Soccer Stadium	2,200
Michigan State Spartans	East Lansing, Michigan	DeMartin Soccer Complex	2,500
Northwestern Wildcats	Evanston, Illinois	Lakeside Field	2,000
Ohio State Buckeyes	Columbus, Ohio	Owens Memorial Stadium	10,000
Penn State Nittany Lions	State College, Pennsylvania	Jeffrey Field	5,000
Rutgers Scarlet Knights	Piscataway, New Jersey	Yurcak Field	5,000
Wisconsin Badgers	Madison, Wisconsin	McClimon Stadium	2,000

- Illinois, Iowa, Minnesota, Nebraska and Purdue do not sponsor men's soccer

=== Personnel ===
Team	Head coach	Shirt supplier
Indiana	(United States) Todd Yeagley	(Germany) Adidas
Maryland	(North Macedonia) Sasho Cirovski	(United States) Under Armour
Michigan	(Canada) Chaka Daley	(Germany) Adidas
Michigan State	(United States) Damon Rensing	(United States) Nike
Northwestern	(United States) Tim Lenahan	(United States) Under Armour
Ohio State	(United States) John Bluem	(United States) Nike
Penn State	(United States) Bob Warming	(United States) Nike
Rutgers	(United States) Dan Donigan	(Germany) Adidas
Wisconsin	(United States) John Trask	(Germany) Adidas

== Regular season ==
=== Results ===
Home \ Away	IND	UMD	MIC	MSU	NOR	OSU	PSU	RUT	WIS
Indiana	—	1–2	—	2–3	1–1	—	0–1	—	—
Maryland	—	—	—	0–1	—	1–0	4–0	—	2–0
Michigan	1–3	1–1	—	—	—	1–2	0–1	—	—
Michigan State	—	—	2–3	—	1–1	—	—	0–0	2–1
Northwestern	—	3–2	0–0	—	—	—	2–1	—	2–0
Ohio State	1–2	—	—	3–2	2–0	—	—	4–1	—
Penn State	—	—	—	0–2	—	1–0	—	1–0	2–1
Rutgers	1–2	2–3	0–3	—	0–2	—	—	—	—
Wisconsin	2–2	—	1–2	—	—	0–2	—	2–3	—

Source: Team Statistics
Legend: Blue = home team win; Yellow = draw; Red = away team win.

== Postseason ==
=== Big Ten Tournament ===
Semifinal
1	Maryland^{PKs}	0(3)
5	Michigan State	0(2)
6	Indiana	2
2	Ohio State	1

Final
1	Maryland	2
6	Indiana	1

=== NCAA Tournament ===
Seed	Region	School	1st Round	2nd Round	3rd Round	Quarterfinals
3	3	Michigan State	BYE	W 1–0 vs. Oakland – (East Lansing)	T, 2–2 ^{W, 4–3 pen.} vs. Washington – (East Lansing)	L, 2–3 vs. Providence – (East Lansing)
4	2	Maryland	BYE	L, 0–1 vs. UMBC – (College Park)		
5	2	Indiana	BYE	L, 0–1 vs. Xavier – (Bloomington)		
—	1	Ohio State	T, 1–1 ^{W, 13–12 pen.} vs. Akron – (Columbus)	L, 1–2 vs. Notre Dame – (Notre Dame)		
—	1	Penn State	W 2–1 vs. Hartwick – (Evanston)	L, 1–2 vs. Syracuse – (Syracuse)		
—	4	Northwestern	L, 0–1 vs. SIU Edwardsville – (State College)			

== See also ==
- Big Ten Conference
- 2014 Big Ten Conference Men's Soccer Tournament
- 2014 NCAA Division I men's soccer season
- 2014 in American soccer
