= 2014 Indiana Hoosiers men's soccer team =

Indiana Hoosiers
2014 season
- Head Coach: Todd Yeagley
- Stadium: Bill Armstrong Stadium
- Big Ten: 6th (4–2–2)
- Big Ten Tournament: Runner-up
- NCAA Tournament: 2nd round
Home colors	Away colors

2014 Big Ten Conference men's soccer standings
	Conf.					Overall
Team	W		L		T	W		L		T
No. 19 Maryland ‡	5	–	2	–	1	13	–	6	–	3
Ohio State +	5	–	3	–	0	9	–	8	–	5
Northwestern +	4	–	1	–	3	9	–	4	–	6
No. 23 Penn State +	5	–	3	–	0	13	–	6	–	1
No. 8 Michigan St. +	4	–	2	–	2	12	–	5	–	6
No. 17 Indiana +	3	–	3	–	2	12	–	5	–	5
Michigan	3	–	3	–	2	6	–	9	–	3
Rutgers	1	–	6	–	1	6	–	12	–	1
Wisconsin	0	–	7	–	1	3	–	12	–	3
‡ - Tournament champion +- Invited to the NCAA Division I Men's Soccer Championship; As of December 16, 2014; Rankings from NSCAA

The 2014 Indiana Hoosiers men's soccer team was the college's 42nd season of playing organized men's college soccer. The Hoosiers entered the season as the defending Big Ten Champions.

== Background ==
Despite finishing fifth in the 2013 regular season, Indiana won the Big Ten Tournament final against Michigan State. Indiana lost in the first round of the 2013 NCAA Tournament to Akron.

== Roster ==
Note: Flags indicate national team as defined under FIFA eligibility rules; some limited exceptions apply. Players may hold more than one non-FIFA nationality.

No.	Pos.	Nation	Player
0	GK	USA	Kyle Wieschhaus
1	GK	USA	Michael Soderlund
2	DF	USA	Billy McConnell
3	DF	USA	Derek Creviston
4	FW	USA	Femi Hollinger-Janzen
5	DF	USA	Grant Lillard
6	MF	USA	Jack Griffith
7	MF	USA	Matt Foldesy
8	MF	USA	Michael Riedford
9	FW	USA	Andrew Oliver
10	MF	USA	Tanner Thompson
11	MF	USA	Cory Thomas
13	DF	USA	Francesco Moore
14	DF	USA	Phil Fives
15	MF	USA	Jamie Vollmer
16	MF	USA	Dylan Lax
17	FW	USA	Jay McIntosh

No.	Pos.	Nation	Player
18	MF	USA	Richard Ballard
19	DF	USA	Patrick Doody
20	DF	USA	Timmy Mehl
21	FW	USA	Kyle Sparks
22	MF	USA	Michael Galullo
23	DF	USA	Kerel Bradford
24	MF	USA	Trevor Swartz
25	DF	USA	Zach Martin
26	DF	USA	Adam Goldfaden
27	MF	USA	Brad Shaw
28	MF	USA	Jake Rufe
29	FW	USA	Josh Lipe-Melton
31	GK	USA	Will Lukowski
32	GK	USA	Colin Webb
33	GK	USA	Sean Weidman

== Competitions ==
=== Preseason ===
August 19	Indiana	0–1	Xavier	Bloomington, Indiana
7:30 pm ET		Report		Stadium: Armstrong Stadium; Attendance: 432

August 23	Indiana	1–0	Washington	Bloomington, Indiana
6:00 pm ET		Report		Stadium: Armstrong Stadium

=== Regular season ===
==== Big Ten Standings ====
Team	Conference								Overall						
Team	Pld	W	L	T	GF	GA	GD	Pts	Pld	W	L	T	GF	GA	GD
Maryland	8	5	2	1	15	8	+7	16	22	13	6	3	35	19	+16
Ohio State	8	5	3	0	14	8	+6	15	22	9	8	5	28	22	+6
Northwestern	8	4	1	3	11	7	+4	15	19	9	4	6	22	12	+10
Penn State	8	5	3	0	7	9	–2	15	20	13	6	1	29	18	+11
Michigan State	8	4	2	2	13	10	+3	14	23	12	5	6	31	19	+12
Indiana	8	3	3	2	13	12	+1	11	22	12	5	5	35	22	+13
Michigan	8	3	3	2	11	10	+1	11	18	6	9	3	20	23	–3
Rutgers	8	1	6	1	7	17	–10	4	19	6	12	1	23	36	–13
Wisconsin	8	0	7	1	7	17	–10	1	18	3	12	3	20	34	–14

==== Match results ====
August 29 1	Indiana	1–1	Georgetown	Bloomington, Indiana
8:00 pm ET		Report		Stadium: Armstrong Stadium; Attendance: 4,911; Referee: Cesar Ibarra

August 31 2	Indiana	1–0	Marquette	Bloomington, Indiana
2:00 pm ET		Report		Stadium: Armstrong Stadium; Attendance: 3,117; Referee: Pawel Wydra

September 5 3	Indiana	1–0	Kentucky	Notre Dame, Indiana
5:00 pm ET		Report		Stadium: Alumni Stadium; Referee: Dave Jaworski

September 8 4	Indiana	1–0	Dartmouth	Notre Dame, Indiana
1:00 pm ET		Report		Stadium: Alumni Stadium; Attendance: 653; Referee: Brandon Artis

September 13 5	Indiana	0–1	Penn State	Bloomington, Indiana
7:30 pm ET		Report		Stadium: Armstrong Stadium; Attendance: 3,205; Referee: Keith Angel

September 17 6	Indiana	0–0	Butler	Bloomington, Indiana
7:30 pm ET		Report		Stadium: Armstrong Stadium; Attendance: 1,719; Referee: Chico Grajeda

September 20 7	Rutgers	1–2	Indiana	Piscataway, New Jersey
7:00 pm ET		Report		Stadium: Yurcak Field; Attendance: 1,246; Referee: Cesar Ibarra

September 24 8	Indiana	4–2	UCF	Bloomington, Indiana
7:30 pm ET		Report		Stadium: Armstrong Stadium; Attendance: 1,475; Referee: Abbey Okulaja

September 28 9	Indiana	1–1	Northwestern	Bloomington, Indiana
2:30 pm ET		Report		Stadium: Armstrong Stadium; Attendance: 1,966; Referee: Mark Kadlecik

October 1 10	Indiana	3–1	St. Louis	Bloomington, Indiana
7:30 pm ET		Report		Stadium: Armstrong Stadium; Attendance: 1,736; Referee: Sorin Stoica

October 7 11	Louisville	0–3	Indiana	Louisville, Kentucky
7:30 pm ET		Report		Stadium: Lynn Stadium; Attendance: 3,755; Referee: Chico Grajeda

October 12 12	Ohio State	1–2	Indiana	Columbus, Ohio
2:00 pm ET		Report		Stadium: Jesse Owens Memorial Stadium; Attendance: 587; Referee: Cesar Ibarra

October 29 13	Indiana	1–2	Maryland	Bloomington, Indiana
1:00 pm ET		Report		Stadium: Armstrong Stadium; Attendance: 2,309; Referee: Abbey Okulaja

October 22 14	Indiana	1–0	Notre Dame	Bloomington, Indiana
7:00 pm ET		Report		Stadium: Armstrong Stadium; Attendance: 3,159; Referee: Jorge Cuate

October 26 15	Michigan	1–3	Indiana	Ann Arbor, Michigan
12:00 pm ET		Report		Stadium: U-M Soccer Stadium; Attendance: 1,235; Referee: Chico Grajeda

October 29 16	Evansville	0–2	Indiana	Evansville, Indiana
8:00 pm ET		Report		Stadium: McCutchan Stadium; Attendance: 2,653; Referee: Douglas Wolff

November 1 17	Wisconsin	2–2	Indiana	Madison, Wisconsin
8:00 pm ET		Report		Stadium: McClimon Complex; Attendance: 640; Referee: Andrew Chapin

November 5 18	Indiana	2–3	Michigan State	Bloomington, Indiana
6:00 pm ET		Report		Stadium: Armstrong Stadium; Attendance: 1,858; Referee: Dimitar Chavdarov

=== Big Ten Tournament ===
November 9 QF	Northwestern	1–1 (a.e.t.) (4–5 p)	Indiana	Evanston, Illinois
1:00 p.m. ET		Report		Stadium: Lakeside Field; Attendance: 624; Referee: Cesar Ibarra

November 14 SF	Ohio State	1–2	Indiana	College Park, Maryland
1:00 pm ET		Report		Stadium: Ludwig Field; Referee: Pawell Wydra

November 16 F	Maryland	2–1	Indiana	College Park, Maryland
12:30 pm ET		Report		Stadium: Ludwig Field; Attendance: 2,272; Referee: Edvin Jurisevic

=== NCAA Tournament ===
November 23 2nd round	Indiana	1–2	Xavier	Bloomington, Indiana
1:00 pm ET		Report		Stadium: Armstrong Stadium; Attendance: 719; Referee: Cesar Ibarra

== Transfers ==
=== Out ===
No.	Pos.	Player	Transferred to	Fee/notes	Date	Source
7	MF	(United States) Harrison Petts		Graduated	December 31, 2013	
17	DF	(United States) Jacob Bushue		Graduated	December 31, 2013	
10	MF	(United States) A. J. Corrado	(United States) San Jose Earthquakes	Selected in the 2014 MLS SuperDraft	January 16, 2014	
8	MF	(United States) Nikita Kotlov	(United States) Portland Timbers	Selected in the 2014 MLS SuperDraft	January 16, 2014	
14	FW	(United States) Tommy Thompson	(United States) San Jose Earthquakes	Signed a HGP contract	January 17, 2014	

== See also ==
- 2014 Big Ten Conference men's soccer season
- 2014 Big Ten Conference Men's Soccer Tournament
- 2014 NCAA Division I Men's Soccer Championship
