= Minutillo =

Minutillo is an Italian surname. Notable people with the surname include:

- Gastón Minutillo (born 1987), Argentine soccer player
- Mikey Minutillo (born 1991), American soccer player
