= 2015 Big Ten men's soccer tournament =

2015 Big Ten Conference men's soccer tournament
Tournament details
- Country: United States
- Teams: 9

Final positions
- Champions: Maryland
- Runners-up: Ohio State

Tournament statistics
- Matches played: 8
- Goals scored: 22 (2.75 per match)
- Top goal scorer: Tied (2)

Awards
- Best player: Offensive: Tsubasa Endoh Defensive: Cody Niedermeier

2015 Big Ten Conference men's soccer standings
	Conf.					Overall
Team	W		L		T	W		L		T
No. 14 Ohio State +	5	–	2	–	1	14	–	7	–	4
No. 19 Indiana +	4	–	3	–	1	13	–	5	–	3
No. 12 Maryland ‡	3	–	2	–	3	12	–	5	–	6
No. 23 Rutgers +	4	–	4	–	0	12	–	7	–	2
Northwestern	4	–	4	–	0	7	–	9	–	2
Michigan	3	–	3	–	2	8	–	6	–	4
Wisconsin	2	–	3	–	3	5	–	11	–	3
Penn State	2	–	4	–	2	7	–	8	–	3
Michigan St.	2	–	4	–	2	8	–	9	–	2
‡-Tournament champion +- Invited to the NCAA Division I Men's Soccer Championship; As of December 4, 2015; Rankings from NSCAA

The 2015 Big Ten Conference men's soccer tournament was the 25th edition of the tournament. It determined the Big Ten Conference's automatic berth into the 2015 NCAA Division I Men's Soccer Championship.

The Maryland Terrapins won the tournament, besting the Ohio State Buckeyes in the championship match.

== Bracket ==
Play-in Round
8	Michigan State	1
9	Penn State (OT)	2

Quarterfinals
1	Ohio State (OT)	1
9	Penn State	0
4	Rutgers	2
5	Northwestern	0
3	Maryland	5
6	Michigan	2
2	Indiana	1
7	Wisconsin	0

Semifinals
1	Ohio State	4
4	Rutgers	0
3	Maryland (pen.)	1 (3)
2	Indiana	1 (2)

Championship
1	Ohio State	0
3	Maryland	2

== Schedule ==
=== Preliminary round ===
November 7	Michigan State	1–2 (a.e.t.)	Penn State	Columbus, Ohio
1:00 PM ET	Sierakowski 63'	Report	Harris 49'; James 95'	Stadium: Jesse Owens Memorial Stadium; Attendance: 214; Referee: Cien Asoera

=== Quarterfinals ===
November 8	Rutgers	2–0	Northwestern	Piscataway, New Jersey
1:00 PM ET	Taintor 24', 85'	Report		Stadium: Yurcak Field; Attendance: 544; Referee: Shane Butler

November 8	Maryland	5–2	Michigan	College Park, Maryland
1:00 PM ET	Elney 24'; Williamson 47'; Sejdic 81'; Crognale 82'; Odoi-Atsem 89'	Report	Murphy 65'; McAtee 88'	Stadium: Ludwig Field; Attendance: 903; Referee: Jodi Fick

November 8	Indiana	1–0	Wisconsin	Bloomington, Indiana
1:05 PM ET	Hollinger-Janzen 22'	Report		Stadium: Bill Armstrong Stadium; Attendance: 1,047; Referee: Cesar Ibarra

November 8	Ohio State	1–0 (a.e.t.)	Penn State	Columbus, Ohio
4:00 PM ET	Culbertson 93'	Report		Stadium: Jesse Owens Memorial Stadium; Attendance: 514; Referee: Jorge Cuate

=== Semifinals ===
November 13	Ohio State	4–0	Rutgers	Columbus, Ohio
1:00 PM ET	Mohamed 1'; Jensen 20'; Soldat 46'; Nichols 87'	Report		Stadium: Jesse Owens Memorial Stadium; Attendance: 628; Referee: Peter Dhima

November 13	Indiana	1–1 (a.e.t.) (2–3 p)	Maryland	Columbus, Ohio
3:30 PM ET	Fives 13'	Report	Endoh 10'	Stadium: Jesse Owens Memorial Stadium; Attendance: 628; Referee: Mohammad Samadpour
	Penalties
	Hollinger-Janzen (penalty scored); Thompson (penalty scored); Gutman (penalty missed); Moore (penalty missed); Webb (penalty missed); Mehl (penalty missed)		(penalty scored) Corboz; (penalty missed) Endoh; (penalty missed) Crognale; (penalty scored) Korvah; (penalty missed) Kabelik; (penalty scored) Smith

=== Final ===
November 15	Ohio State	0–2	Maryland	Columbus, Ohio
1:00 PM ET		Report	Williamson 10'; Endoh 88'	Stadium: Jesse Owens Memorial Stadium; Attendance: 1,120; Referee: Keith Angel

== All-Tournament team ==
The following players were selected as the best players of the tournament.

- Grant Lillard, Indiana
- Tsubasa Endoh, Maryland
- Cody Niedermeier, Maryland
- Eryk Williamson, Maryland
- Rylee Woods, Michigan
- Layth Masri, Northwestern
- Zach Mason, Ohio State
- Evan Finney, Penn State
- Mitch Taintor, Rutgers
- Andrew Conner, Wisconsin

== See also ==
- Big Ten Conference Men's Soccer Tournament
- 2015 Big Ten Conference men's soccer season
- 2015 NCAA Division I men's soccer season
- 2015 NCAA Division I Men's Soccer Championship
