= 2014 Northeast Conference men's soccer season =

Northeast Conference
- Season: 2014
- Champions: Saint Francis (PA)
- NEC Tournament Champions: St. Francis Brooklyn
- NCAA Tournament: St. Francis Brooklyn
- Matches: 28
- Goals: 68 (2.43 per match)
- Top goalscorer: Ryan Byers, SFU (6 goals)
- Average attendance: 244

2014 Northeast Conference men's soccer standings
	Conf.					Overall
Team	W		L		T	W		L		T
Saint Francis (PA)	6	–	1	–	0	13	–	6	–	1
Bryant	5	–	0	–	2	9	–	5	–	3
St. Francis Brooklyn ‡	4	–	1	–	2	11	–	6	–	4
LIU Brooklyn	4	–	3	–	0	5	–	12	–	0
Robert Morris	2	–	4	–	1	7	–	9	–	2
Fairleigh Dickinson	2	–	4	–	1	4	–	12	–	2
Central Connecticut	1	–	5	–	1	5	–	10	–	2
Sacred Heart	0	–	6	–	1	0	–	16	–	2
‡ - Tournament champion + - Invited to the NCAA Division I Men's Soccer Championship; As of November 21, 2014; Rankings from NSCAA

The 2014 Northeast Conference men's soccer season will be the 34th season of men's varsity soccer in the conference.

The Central Connecticut Blue Devils are the defending regular season champions, while the St. Francis Brooklyn Terriers are the defending tournament champions.

Saint Francis (PA) won the Regular Season Championship by going 6-1-0 in conference play and will host the NEC Tournament in Loretto, Pennsylvania. St. Francis Brooklyn won the 2014 NEC Tournament Championship with the 3rd seed by beating Bryant (2–0) then Saint Francis (PA) (2–1).

== Changes from 2013 ==
- None

== Teams ==
=== Stadia and locations ===
Team	Location	Stadium	Capacity
Bryant Bulldogs	Smithfield, Rhode Island	Bulldog Stadium	5,500
Central Connecticut Blue Devils	New Britain, Connecticut	CCSU Soccer Field	550
Fairleigh Dickinson Knights	Florham Park, New Jersey	University Stadium	500
LIU Brooklyn Blackbirds	Brooklyn, New York	LIU Field	400
Robert Morris Colonials	Moon Township, Pennsylvania	North Athletic Complex	800
Sacred Heart Pioneers	Fairfield, Connecticut	Campus Field	3,334
St. Francis Terriers	Brooklyn, New York	Brooklyn Bridge Park, Pier 5	300
Saint Francis Red Flash	Loretto, Pennsylvania	Stokes Soccerplex	500

== Regular season ==
=== Results ===
Team/Opponent	BRY	CCS	FDU	LIU	RMU	SHU	SFBK	SFU
Bryant Bulldogs		2-1 (OT)	2-1	2-1 (OT)	1-0 (OT)	1-1 (2OT)	1-1 (2OT)	1-0
Central Connecticut Blue Devils	1–2 (2OT)		2-2 (2OT)	1–2	0–2	1-0	0–1 (OT)	1–2
Fairleigh Dickinson Knights	1–2	2-2 (2OT)		0–1	3-2 (OT)	1-0	0–1	1–2
LIU Brooklyn Blackbirds	1–2 (OT)	2-1	1-0		1-0	3-1	0–2	0–1
Robert Morris Colonials	0–1 (OT)	2-0	2–3 (OT)	0–1		3-1	1-1 (2OT)	0–4
Sacred Heart Pioneers	1-1 (2OT)	0–1	0–1	1–3	1–3		1–2	0–2
St. Francis Terriers	1-1 (2OT)	1-0 (OT)	1-0	2-0	1-1 (2OT)	2-1		0–1
Saint Francis Red Flash	0–1	2-1	2-1	3-2	4-0	2-0	3-2	

=== Honors ===
- Player of the Year: Neco Brett (Robert Morris)
- Defensive Player of the Year: Francis de Vries (Saint Francis (PA))
- Rookie of the Year: Filosmar Cordiero (Central Connecticut)
- Coach of the Year: Michael Casper (Saint Francis (PA))

2014 NEC First Team All-Conference

Player	School	Position	Class	Hometown (Previous school)
Neco Brett	Robert Morris	Forward	Sophomore	Kingston, Jamaica (Excelsior)
Brice Merwine	LIU Brooklyn	Forward	Senior	Carlisle, Pennsylvania (Carlisle)
Ryan Byers	Saint Francis (PA)	Forward	Senior	Scottsdale, Pennsylvania (Southmoreland)
Keir Hannity	Central Connecticut	Midfielder	Senior	Sheffield, England (Lancaster University)
Brett Larocque	Bryant	Midfielder	Junior	Ottawa, Ontario (Ecole Jean Vanier)
Pablo Medina	Saint Francis (PA)	Midfielder	Senior	Monterrey, Mexico (IMG Academies)
Devon Williams	Robert Morris	Midfield	Senior	Kingston, Jamaica (St. Georges)
Mitch Kavlick	Saint Francis (PA)	Defender	Senior	Erie, Pennsylvania (Erie McDowell)
Francis de Vries	Saint Francis (PA)	Defender	Sophomore	Christchurch, New Zealand (Cashmere)
Ricky Milano	St. Francis Brooklyn	Defender	R-Senior	Caracas, Venezuela (Colegio Los Arcos)
Jack Binks	St. Francis Brooklyn	Goalkeeper	R-Junior	Darlington, England (Hurworth Comprehensive)

== Postseason ==
=== NEC Tournament ===
Semi-finals; Friday, November 14
1	Saint Francis (PA)	1
4	LIU Brooklyn	0
2	Bryant	0
3	St. Francis Brooklyn	2

Final; Sunday, November 16
1	Saint Francis (PA)	1
3	St. Francis Brooklyn	2 (OT)

=== NCAA tournament ===
Seed	Region	School	1st Round	2nd Round	3rd Round	Quarterfinals	Semi-finals	Championship
	1	St. Francis Brooklyn	L, 0–3 vs. Old Dominion					
