= 2014 Big Ten men's soccer tournament =

2014 Big Ten Conference men's soccer tournament
Tournament details
- Country: United States
- Teams: 9

Final positions
- Champions: Maryland
- Runners-up: Indiana

Tournament statistics
- Matches played: 1
- Goals scored: 7 (7 per match)

2014 Big Ten Conference men's soccer standings
	Conf.					Overall
Team	W		L		T	W		L		T
No. 19 Maryland ‡	5	–	2	–	1	13	–	6	–	3
Ohio State +	5	–	3	–	0	9	–	8	–	5
Northwestern +	4	–	1	–	3	9	–	4	–	6
No. 23 Penn State +	5	–	3	–	0	13	–	6	–	1
No. 8 Michigan St. +	4	–	2	–	2	12	–	5	–	6
No. 17 Indiana +	3	–	3	–	2	12	–	5	–	5
Michigan	3	–	3	–	2	6	–	9	–	3
Rutgers	1	–	6	–	1	6	–	12	–	1
Wisconsin	0	–	7	–	1	3	–	12	–	3
‡ - Tournament champion +- Invited to the NCAA Division I Men's Soccer Championship; As of December 16, 2014; Rankings from NSCAA

The 2014 Big Ten Conference men's soccer tournament was the 24th postseason tournament to determine the champion of the Big Ten Conference. The defending champion was Indiana. The tournament was held from November 8–16, 2014. Maryland won the tournament.

== Bracket ==
Play-in Round
8	Rutgers	5
9	Wisconsin	2

Quarterfinals
1	Maryland	2
8	Rutgers	0
4	Penn State	0
5	Michigan State	1
3	Northwestern	1(4)
6	Indiana ^{PKs}	1(5)
2	Ohio State	1
7	Michigan	0

Semifinals
1	Maryland^{PKs}	0(3)
5	Michigan State	0(2)
6	Indiana	2
2	Ohio State	1

Championship
1	Maryland	2
6	Indiana	1

== Schedule ==
=== Play-in round ===
November 8	Rutgers	5–2	Wisconsin	College Park, Maryland
1:00 p.m. EST	O'Rourke 19'; Bruccoleri 44'; Wright 60', 71'; Taintor 64'	Report	Segbers 63'; Barlow 83'	Stadium: Ludwig Field; Attendance: 71

=== Quarterfinals ===
November 9	Maryland	2–0	Rutgers	College Park, Maryland
1:00 p.m. EST				Stadium: Ludwig Field

November 9	Penn State	0–1	Michigan State	State College, Pennsylvania
1:00 p.m. EST				Stadium: Jeffrey Field

November 9	Northwestern	1–1 (a.e.t.) (4–5 p)	Indiana	Evanston, Illinois
1:00 p.m. EST				Stadium: Lanny and Sharon Martin Stadium

November 9	Ohio State	1–0	Michigan	Columbus, Ohio
1:00 p.m. EST				Stadium: Jesse Owens Memorial Stadium

=== Semifinals ===
November 14	Maryland	0–0 (a.e.t.) (3–2 p)	Michigan State	College Park, Maryland
3:40 p.m. EST				Stadium: Ludwig Field

November 14	Indiana	2–1	Ohio State	College Park, Maryland
1:00 p.m. EST				Stadium: Ludwig Field

=== Final ===
November 16	Maryland	2–1	Indiana	College Park, Maryland
12:30 p.m. EST				Stadium: Ludwig Field

== See also ==
- Big Ten Conference Men's Soccer Tournament
- 2014 Big Ten Conference men's soccer season
- 2014 NCAA Division I men's soccer season
- 2014 NCAA Division I Men's Soccer Championship
