= 2014 St. Francis Brooklyn Terriers men's soccer team =

American college soccer season

2014 St. Francis Brooklyn Terriers men's soccer

NEC Tournament Champions

NCAA Soccer Championship, First Round
- Conference: Northeast Conference
- Record: 11–6–4 (4–1–2 NEC)
- Head coach: Tom Giovatto (8th season)
- Assistant coaches: Sinan Selmani (8th season); Christopher Helms (1st season)
- Home stadium: Brooklyn Bridge Park, Pier 5

2014 Northeast Conference men's soccer standings
	Conf.					Overall
Team	W		L		T	W		L		T
Saint Francis (PA)	6	–	1	–	0	13	–	6	–	1
Bryant	5	–	0	–	2	9	–	5	–	3
St. Francis Brooklyn ‡	4	–	1	–	2	11	–	6	–	4
LIU Brooklyn	4	–	3	–	0	5	–	12	–	0
Robert Morris	2	–	4	–	1	7	–	9	–	2
Fairleigh Dickinson	2	–	4	–	1	4	–	12	–	2
Central Connecticut	1	–	5	–	1	5	–	10	–	2
Sacred Heart	0	–	6	–	1	0	–	16	–	2
‡ - Tournament champion + - Invited to the NCAA Division I Men's Soccer Championship; As of November 21, 2014; Rankings from NSCAA

The 2014 St. Francis Brooklyn Terriers men's soccer team represented St. Francis College during the 2014 NCAA Division I men's soccer season. The Terrier's home games were played at Brooklyn Bridge Park, Pier 5. The team has been a member of the Northeast Conference since 1981 and is coached by Tom Giovatto, who is in his eighth year at the helm of the Terriers.

St. Francis Brooklyn finished the regular season at 9–5–4 and conference play at 4–1–2 qualifying for the NEC Tournament with the 3rd seed. In the semi-finals against the Bryant Bulldogs, St. Francis won 2-0 with both goals coming from Junior Midfielder Vincent Bezecourt. In the championship match, the Terriers defeated the Saint Francis Red Flash 2-1 in overtime in Loretto, Pennsylvania, with senior co-captain Andy Cormack scoring the game-winning goal on a free kick from 15 yards out in the 94th minute. Cormack also scored the golden goal via a free kick in last year's championship game against the Bryant Bulldogs. Cormack was named the NEC Tournament's Most Valuable Player and named to College Soccer News National Team of the Week. With the NEC Championship the Terriers qualified for their second consecutive NCAA Tournament where they faced Old Dominion in the first round and lost 0-3.

After the season, 3 members of the 2014 Northeast Conference Champion St. Francis Brooklyn Terriers men's soccer team were named to the 2014 National Soccer Coaches Association of America's All-Northeast Region team. Senior defender Riccardo Milano and junior goal keeper Jack Binks were named to the second team, while junior midfielder Vincent Bezecourt received third team honors.

== 2014 squad ==
As of September 2, 2014. Note: Flags indicate national team as defined under FIFA eligibility rules; some limited exceptions apply. Players may hold more than one non-FIFA nationality.

No.	Pos.	Nation	Player
1	GK	GBR	Jack Binks
3	DF	VEN	**Riccardo Milano**
4	DF	AUS	Paul Galimi
5	DF	GBR	**Andy Cormack**
7	MF	COL	David Pardo
8	DF	GER	Fabian Suele
9	MF	USA	Grei Mujko
10	MF	GBR	Harry Odell
11	MF	USA	Salvatore Barone
15	MF	FRA	Vincent Bezecourt

No.	Pos.	Nation	Player
16	DF	USA	Dominick Falanga
17	MF	USA	Federico Curbelo
18	MF	USA	Philip Shafer
19	MF	FRA	Cyril Coisne
20	MF	USA	Adrian Cosovic
23	MF	ESP	John Makaya
24	MF	GBR	Nyle Patel
33	DF	USA	Daniel Babar
37	MF	USA	David Shafer
91	GK	USA	Seth Erdman

Captains in bold

== Schedule ==
Date Time, TV	Rank^{#}	Opponent^{#}	Result	Record	Site City, State
Non-conference regular season
August 29, 2014*; 8:00 pm		at Saint Joseph's	L 0–1	0–1–0	Sweeney Field (829); Philadelphia, PA
September 2, 2014*; 7:00 pm		Manhattan	L 0–1 ^{2OT}	0–2–0	Brooklyn Bridge Park, Pier 5 (157); Brooklyn, NY
September 5, 2014*; 1:30 pm		vs. UMass Lowell; Windjammer Classic	L 1–3	0–3–0	Virtue Field (0); Burlington, VT
September 7, 2014*; 1:30 pm		at Vermont; Windjammer Classic	L 1–2	0–4–0	Virtue Field (0); Burlington, VT
September 13, 2014*; 1:00 pm		at Lafayette	T 2–2 ^{2OT}	0–4–1	Fisher Field (220); Easton, PA
September 16, 2014*; 7:00 pm		Howard	W 3–0	1–4–1	Brooklyn Bridge Park, Pier 5 (193); Brooklyn, NY
September 20, 2014*; 7:30 pm		at Army	W 2–0	2–4–1	Clinton Field (903); West Point, NY
September 24, 2014*; 4:00 pm		at Saint Peter's	W 2–0	3–4–1	Joseph J. Jaroschak Field (107); Jersey City, NJ
September 27, 2014*; 1:00 pm		Rider	W 2–0	4–4–1	Brooklyn Bridge Park, Pier 5 (300); Brooklyn, NY
September 30, 2014*; 7:00 pm		at Albany	T 0–0 ^{2OT}	4–4–2	Bob Ford Field (451); Albany, NY
October 4, 2014*; 1:00 pm		NJIT	W 2–0	5–4–2	Brooklyn Bridge Park, Pier 5 (105); Brooklyn, NY
Northeast Conference Regular Season
October 10, 2014; 4:30 pm		at Sacred Heart	W 2–1	6–4–2 (1–0–0)	Campus Field (144); Fairfield, CT
October 17, 2014; 7:00 pm		at Saint Francis (PA)	L 0–1	6–5–2 (1–1–0)	DeGol Field (75); Loretto, PA
October 19, 2014; 1:00 pm		at Robert Morris	T 1–1 ^{2OT}	6–5–3 (1–1–1)	North Athletic Complex (284); Moon Township, PA
October 24, 2014; 7:00 pm		Central Connecticut	W 1–0 ^{OT}	7–5–3 (2–1–1)	Brooklyn Bridge Park, Pier 5 (265); Brooklyn, NY
October 26, 2014; 1:00 pm		at Bryant	T 1–1 ^{2OT}	7–5–4 (2–1–2)	Bulldog Stadium (247); Smithfield, RI
October 31, 2014; 7:00 pm		Fairleigh Dickinson	W 1–0	8–5–4 (3–1–2)	Brooklyn Bridge Park, Pier 5 (103); Brooklyn, NY
November 9, 2014; 1:00 pm		LIU Brooklyn; Battle of Brooklyn	W 2–0	9–5–4 (4–1–2)	Brooklyn Bridge Park, Pier 5 (135); Brooklyn, NY
Northeast Conference Tournament
November 14, 2014; 6:30 pm		vs. Bryant; Semifinals	W 2–0	10–5–4	DeGol Field (115); Loretto, PA
November 16, 2014; 1:00 pm		at Saint Francis (PA); Championship	W 2–1 ^{OT}	11–5–4	DeGol Field (621); Loretto, PA
NCAA Tournament
November 20, 2014; 7:00 pm		at Old Dominion; First Round	L 0–3	11–6–4	Old Dominion Soccer Complex; Norfolk, VA
*Non-conference game. ^{#}Rankings from United Soccer Coaches. (#) Tournament seedings in parentheses.

== 2014 NSCAA/Continental Tire College rankings ==
Ranking movements
	Week											
Poll	1	2	3	4	5	6	7	8	9	10	11	Final
North East Region												6

== See also ==
- 2014 Northeast Conference men's soccer season
- 2014 NCAA Division I men's soccer season
- Northeast Conference Men's Soccer Tournament
- 2014 NCAA Division I Men's Soccer Championship
