= Russell Payne (soccer) =

American soccer player and coach

Personal information
- Date of birth: July 13, 1975 (age 51)
- Place of birth: Columbia, Maryland, United States
- Height: 6 ft 01 in (1.85 m)
- Position: Goalkeeper

Youth career
- 1993–1996: Maryland Terrapins

Senior career*
Years	Team	Apps	(Gls)
1997	New Orleans Riverboat Gamblers	20	(0)
1999	Maryland Mania	10	(0)
1999	D.C. United	0	(0)
1999	Colorado Rapids	1	(0)
2000–2001	Boston Bulldogs	22	(0)
2000	→ MetroStars (loan)	1	(0)
2000	→ Cape Cod Crusaders (loan)	0	(0)
2000	→ New England Revolution (loan)	0	(0)
2000	→ Los Angeles Galaxy (loan)	0	(0)
2000–2002	Derry City	47	(0)
2002–2004	SV Elversberg 07	35	(0)
2004–2005	Shamrock Rovers	16	(0)

Managerial career
- 1997: Maryland Terrapins (assistant)
- 1997–1998: George Washington Colonials (assistant)
- 2005–2009: Maryland Terrapins (assistant)
- 2006–2008: United States U20 (assistant)
- 2010–2021: Army Black Knights
- 2012: United States U20 (assistant)
- 2021–: Northwestern Wildcats
- 2026: United States U23 (interim)
- * Club domestic league appearances and goals

Russell Payne (born July 13, 1975, in Columbia, Maryland) is an American soccer coach and former player. Payne is a former goalkeeper who is currently the head coach of the Northwestern Wildcats men's soccer team. He played professionally in Germany, Ireland and Major League Soccer.

== Player ==
=== Youth ===
Payne graduated from Glenelg High School where he was a 1992 Second Team All-Met Boys' Soccer Goalkeeper. He then attended the University of Maryland where he was a four-year (1993–1996) on the men's soccer team. He was an All-ACC selection as a sophomore and led the Atlantic Coast Conference as a senior with a 0.88 goals against average (GAA). He recorded 22.5 shut-outs and made 340 saves during his collegiate career. During that time, Maryland went to three straight NCAA Tournament appearances. Payne also helped Maryland to its first-ever ACC Tournament championship in 1996. He graduated with a bachelor's degree in biology.

=== Professional ===
In 1997, Payne signed with the New Orleans Riverboat Gamblers of the USISL A-League. Payne began as a backup to Tom Dutra but became the starter after Dutra was injured early in the season. That season, the Riverboat Gamblers won the Central Division, but fell in the second round of the playoffs. He then moved to the Netherlands where he played during 1998. In February 1999, Payne was an undrafted invitee to the Chicago Fire training camp, but was released during the pre-season. He then signed with the Maryland Mania of the USL A-League. In April 1999, he was called up to D.C. United of Major League Soccer when backup Mark Simpson was injured. He played on exhibition, but no regular season games before returning to the Mania the first week of July. On July 31, 1999, the Colorado Rapids signed Payne for the remainder of the season. He played fourteen minutes in one game. The Rapids waived him on February 24, 2000, after acquiring several goalies in the draft and through trades. Payne then signed with the Boston Bulldogs of the USL A-League. During the 2000 season, he played at least one game with the Cape Cod Crusaders. He was called up to the MetroStars as a backup goalie for three games early in the season when Mike Ammann was injured. He also spent time with the New England Revolution and Los Angeles Galaxy in July as a backup goalkeeper. In August 2000, the MetroStars signed Payne on loan and he played one game for them, allowing two goals in eight minutes. On February 5, 2001, the MetroStars drafted Payne in the sixth round (70th overall) in the 2001 MLS SuperDraft. This gave them the rights to Payne for the upcoming season. In March 2001, the MetroStars released him during the preseason. He then moved to Derry City F.C. of the League of Ireland where he played eleven games at the end of the 2000–2001 season. During the 2001–2002 season, Payne was Derry City's Player of the Year. In 2002, he moved to SV Elversberg of Germany where he played two seasons. In 2004, he signed with Shamrock Rovers. Payne made his debut for The Hoops on September 11, 2004, against Cork City and went on to make 16 appearances. His last game was against St Patricks Athletic on May 13, 2005, where he had a nightmare game. Due to a team in decline he only kept one clean sheet in this time, against his old team Derry City.

== Coach ==
At the end of the 1997 USISL A-League season, Payne returned to the University of Maryland where he served as an assistant coach for the 1997 collegiate season. He then coached collegiately at George Washington in 1997–98 as the goalkeeper coach. Payne spent three seasons as the goalkeeper coach for the SV Elversberg U-16 team. While playing for Derry City F.C., he also served as the club's U-18 goalkeeper coach. In 2005, he left Ireland to become assistant coach with the Maryland Terrapins. In his first season back in College Park they won the National Championship for the first time since 1968. In the summer of 2006 and 2008, Payne served as an assistant coach for the U.S. U-20 team that played in the Milk Cup in Northern Ireland. In December 2009, Payne became the head coach at West Point.

Payne served as the interim head coach for the United States men's national under-23 soccer team during the March and June international windows.

== Personal life ==
Payne and his wife, model Vanessa Payne, live in West Point, N.Y. They have two children, Harper Elizabeth Payne (born December 2009) and Kellen Payne.
