= Raby George =

Swedish footballer (born 1992)

Personal information
- Full name: Raby Abdulmasih George
- Date of birth: 13 February 1992 (age 34)
- Place of birth: Södertälje, Sweden
- Height: 1.79 m (5 ft 10 1/2 in)
- Position: Midfielder

Youth career
- –2008: Assyriska FF
- 2008–2009: Hammarby IF
- 2010: Syrianska FC

College career
Years	Team	Apps	(Gls)
2012–2016	North Carolina Tar Heels	85	(10)

Senior career*
Years	Team	Apps	(Gls)
2011–2012	Syrianska FC	1	(0)
2016	Georgia Revolution FC	8	(0)
2016–2019	Enhörna IF	44	(16)
2020–2021	Trosa-Vagnhärad SK	21	(4)
2022–	Enhörna IF	14	(13)
- * Club domestic league appearances and goals as of 22 November 2022

Raby Abdulmasih George (born 13 February 1992) is a Swedish footballer who plays as a midfielder for Enhörna IF.

== Career ==
Raby George made his Allsvenskan debut for Syrianska FC in 2011, coming on as a substitute for Nahir Oyal against Helsingborgs IF in the 88th minute.

He left Syrianska FC in August of the following year to enroll at the University of North Carolina at Chapel Hill as a student-athlete, earning a North Carolina Tar Heels soccer scholarship. He played four seasons with North Carolina Tar Heels men's soccer, scoring 10 goals in 85 appearances. While attending UNC, he also played for the U23 team of the National Premier Soccer League club Carolina Railhawks. George spent the 2016 season playing for the Georgia Revolution FC in the NPSL.

When returning to Sweden in 2016, he signed with Enhörna IF.

== Personal life ==
Raby George is good friends with Chicago Fire defender Jonathan Campbell, whom he befriended while a student-athlete at UNC. George graduated with a Bachelor of Science degree in Economics from UNC in 2016.
