= Enhörna IF =

Swedish football club

- Full name: Enhörna Idrottsförening
- Founded: 1928
- Ground: Friluftsgården; Enhörna; Sweden
- Chairman: Per Persson-Kangas
- Head coach: Mikael Alfredsson
- League: Division 3 Östra Svealand
- 2009: Division 3 Södra Svealand, 5th
Home colours

Enhörna IF is a Swedish football club located in Enhörna, north-west of Södertälje in Södermanland.

== Background ==
Enhörna Idrottsförening was founded on March 13, 1928. Arvid Starberg was elected as chairman and the annual membership fee was set at 4 SEK. The club's first project was to develop a football field at Ekeby idrottsplan which is now part of the current Ekeby residential area. In the early 1940s the club moved to their current site at Friluftsgården. The club also participates in other sports including running. skiing and gymnastics. Floorball and ice hockey have also been part of the club itinerary.

Since their foundation Enhörna IF has participated mainly in the middle and lower divisions of the Swedish football league system. The club currently plays in Division 3 Östra Svealand which is the fifth tier of Swedish football. They play their home matches at the Friluftsgården in Enhörna.

Enhörna IF are affiliated to the Södermanlands Fotbollförbund.

== Recent history ==
In recent seasons Enhörna IF have competed in the following divisions:

2024 – Division IV, Södermanland

2023 – Division IV, Södermanland

2022 – Division IV, Södermanland

2021 – Division IV, Södermanland

2020 – Division IV, Södermanland

2019 – Division III, Södra Svealand

2018 – Division III, Södra Svealand

2017 – Division III, Södra Svealand

2016 – Division IV, Södermanland

2015 – Division IV, Södermanland

2014 – Division IV, Södermanland

2013 – Division IV, Södermanland

2012 – Division IV, Södermanland

2011 – Division IV, Södermanland

2010 – Division III, Östra Svealand
2009 – Division III, Södra Svealand
2008 – Division IV, Södermanland
2007 – Division IV, Södermanland
2006 – Division IV, Södermanland
2005 – Division IV, Södermanland
2004 – Division III, Östra Svealand
2003 – Division III, Östra Svealand
2002 – Division IV, Södermanland
2001 – Division IV, Södermanland
2000 – Division III, Östra Svealand
1999 – Division IV, Södermanland
