= Gastón Minutillo =

Argentine footballer

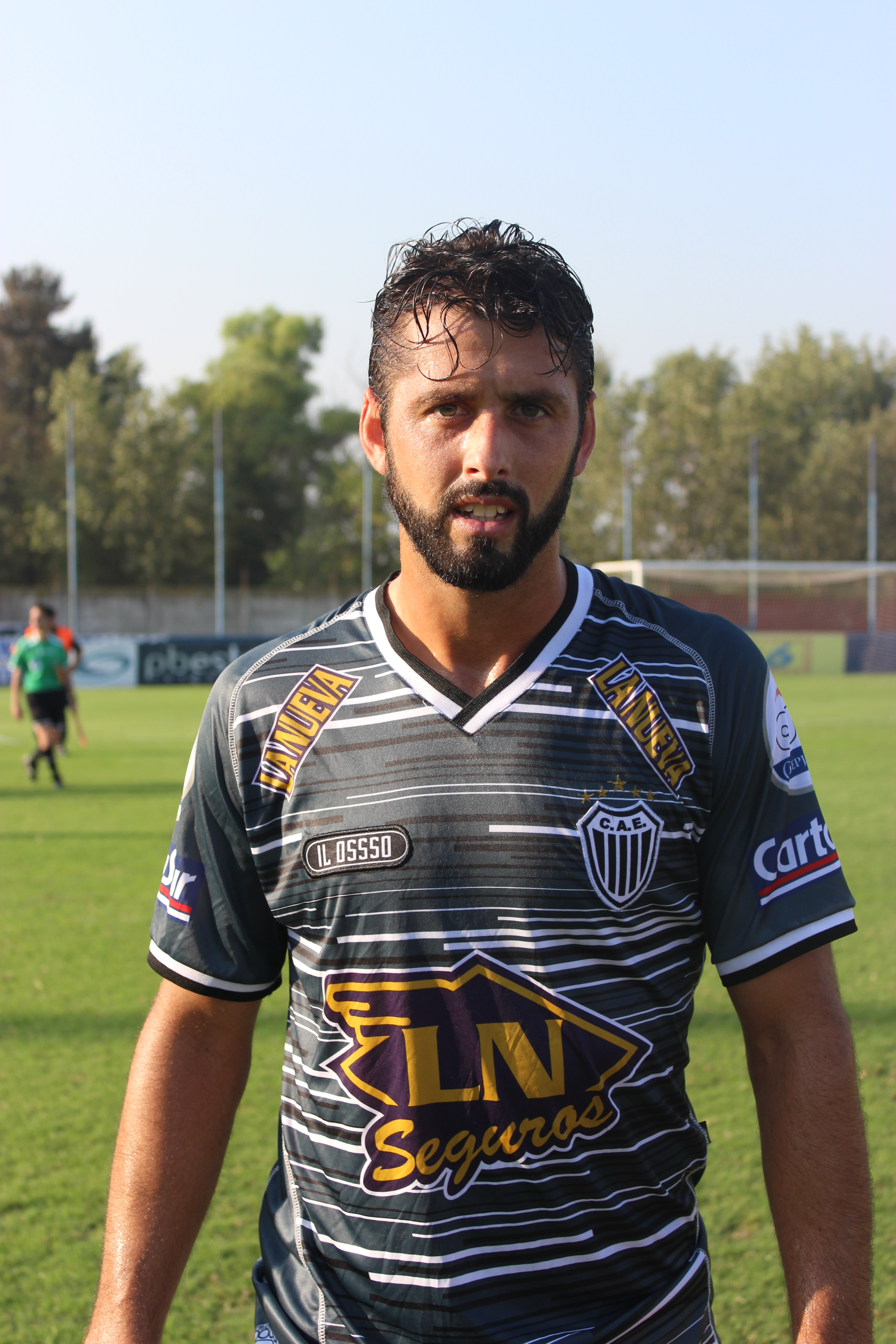
Image of Gaston Minutillo

Gastón Minutillo (born 19 December 1987 in Mar del Plata) is an Argentine former professional footballer who played as a midfielder.

== Clubs ==
- Argentinos Juniors 2005–2006
- Las Rozas 2007–2008
- Leganés 2008–2009
- Toledo 2009–2010
- Pinatar 2010–2011
- Cerrito 2011–2012
- El Tanque Sisley 2012–2013
- Alvarado 2013–2014
- Fénix 2014–2015
- Barracas Central 2016–2017
- Estudiantes de Buenos Aires 2017–2018
- Cerro Largo 2018
