= John Bluem =

American soccer player and coach

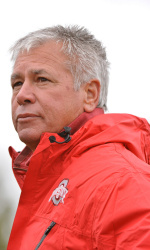
- Bluem with the Ohio State Buckeyes in 2010

Personal information
- Date of birth: April 17, 1953 (age 73)
- Place of birth: Wheeling, West Virginia, U.S.
- Position: Defender

College career
Years	Team	Apps	(Gls)
1972–1974	Hartwick Hawks		

Senior career*
Years	Team	Apps	(Gls)
1975–1976	Tampa Bay Rowdies (indoor)		
1975–1976	Tampa Bay Rowdies	15	(0)

Managerial career
- 1991–1996: Fresno State Bulldogs
- 1997–2017: Ohio State Buckeyes
- * Club domestic league appearances and goals

John Bluem (born 1953) is an American former soccer defender and most recently a coach for the Ohio State Buckeyes. Bluem played professionally in the North American Soccer League. After retiring from playing, Bluem became a men's college soccer coach.

== Player ==
Bluem attended Hartwick College, playing on the men's soccer team from 1972 to 1974. In 1975, he graduated with a Bachelor of Arts degree in history. He was inducted into the Hartwick Warrior, now the Hawks, Hall of Fame in 2002. That year, the Tampa Bay Rowdies selected Bluem in fourth round of the North American Soccer League draft. He played the 1975 NASL indoor season before playing two outdoor seasons with the Rowdies, winning the 1975 NASL championship with them.

== Coach ==
In 1984, Bluem earned a master's degree in sports education from the University of Akron. In 1991, he was hired as head coach of the Fresno State men's soccer team. Over the next six seasons, he took the Bulldogs to four NCAA post-season tournaments and compiled an 86–27–12 record. His best season came in 1996 when Fresno State went 17–5–1, won the first WAC title and finished the season ranked seventh in the nation. In 1997, Bluem moved to Ohio State to coach the Buckeye's men's soccer team. Since then, he has taken Ohio State to six NCAA post-season tournaments and won three Big Ten titles. His greatest success came in the 2007 Division I Men's College Cup when Ohio State finished runner-up to Wake Forest. Bluem announced his retirement from Ohio State on March 19, 2018.

== Broadcasting ==
Bluem was the radio color analyst for Columbus Crew home games from 2007 to 2014.
