= Tim Lenahan =

American soccer coach

Personal information
- Full name: Tim Lenahan
- Date of birth: 06/11/1959 c. 1959 (age 66–67)
- Height: 6 ft 1 in (1.85 m)
- Position: Defender

College career
Years	Team	Apps	(Gls)
- Stockton Ospreys

Managerial career
- 1990–1997: Stockton Ospreys
- 1998–2000: Lafayette Leopards
- 2001–2021: Northwestern Wildcats

Tim Lenahan is an American retired soccer coach known for his 20-year tenure as the head men's soccer coach at Northwestern University starting with the 2001 season. He rebuilt the Northwestern program from a team that had been winless over 35 games in 2000 and 2001 to a national power after previously rebuilding Lafayette and Stockton taking them to 6 NCAA Tournament appearances combined. His teams have made a total of 15 NCAA tournament appearances during his career. He is currently the President/CEO of Nice Guys Finish First, LLC, as an Executive Coach, leadership consultant, and motivational speaker. He serves as a color analyst for the Big Ten Network beginning since 2021. Lenahan retired as the only coach in Big Ten history with 20 years of service to also accumulate 300 wins.

== Early life and education ==
Raised in Pine Hill, New Jersey, Lenahan graduated from Overbrook High School and Camden County College.

== Coaching career ==
In 2004, the 'Cats burst onto the national scene ending Indiana's 50-game Big Ten unbeaten streak. Northwestern had been 4–63–4 in Big Ten play up until the Indiana win and had not won a Big Ten game in 27 tries. The 'Cats won 15 games and qualified for the NCAA for the first time in school history. In 2006, Northwestern advanced to the Elite Eight of the NCAA tournament, defeating Cincinnati, St.Louis, and UNC Greensboro in the first three rounds. They lost in the fourth round to UC Santa Barbara, 3–2 after leading the game 2–1. Northwestern finished 8th in the final rankings thanks to their impressive tournament run. In 2007, Northwestern climbed as high as No. 3 in the NSCAA polls and earned the first bye in their history when they were seeded No. 9 in the NCAA Tournament. Dave Roth was named the first All-American in Northwestern Soccer history. 2008 saw another run to the NCAA Elite Eight and a national ranking of as high as No. 2. They remained at the ranking of No. 2 for over a month and put together a 13-game unbeaten streak to start the season. After a tough final stretch, Northwestern rebounded in the NCAA Tournament to defeat Loyola, Notre Dame, and Akron before falling to North Carolina in the Elite Eight in Chapel Hill. Their final ranking of No. 7 was an all-time best including a lineup that had five players become medical doctors. In 2009, Northwestern responded with another strong season advancing to the Sweet Sixteen and a final RPI of 9th nationally. Mark Blades became the first two-time All-American in school history. Northwestern's RPI over the four seasons from 2006 to 2009 ranked as the 5th best nationally trailing only Wake Forest, Indiana, Virginia, and Maryland and are one of only five teams to make it as far as the Elite Eight twice in the three years between 2006 and 2008.

2011 saw Northwestern and Lenahan accomplish the rare undefeated double in winning the Big Ten Regular Season and Big Ten Tournament. In 2012, the Wildcats repeated as Big Ten Regular Season and reached the NCAA Sweet Sixteen. It was the fourth time Lenahan and Northwestern had reached at least the Sweet Sixteen in a seven-year stretch. Two more NCAA Appearances followed in 2013 and 2014 with the 2014 team losing just four times in nineteen opportunities. Goalkeeper Tyler Miller became the only player in the country to be named All-America, and Academic All-America, and be invited to the MLS Combine. Miller is now the starting GK for DC United in the MLS, and has one of the best win/loss records in history, and has been with the US National Team.

Lenahan previously served as the head soccer coach at Lafayette College, where he turned their fortunes around winning four Patriot League Titles (Two Patriot League Tournament Championships and Two Patriot League Regular Season Championships) in his three years (1998–2001) after taking over a team that had gone 4–12 in each of the two years prior to his arrival. The 1998 team set a Patriot League record for wins with 16 and had the greatest turnaround in the NCAA for that year (+12 wins)

Before Lafayette, Lenahan built his alma mater Richard Stockton College into a Division III national power going to the NCAA Tournament in 1993, 1994, 1995, and 1996 and also capturing Richard Stockton's first NJAC Championship in 1996. Richard Stockton had been 2–15 the year prior to his arrival.

Lenahan has been named either conference or NSCAA Regional Coach of the Year in 1990, 1993, 1996, 1998, 2004, and 2011. He is a two-time winner of the Bob Voigts Coach of the Year at Northwestern and the first male coach to win the award twice.

In 2013, Lenahan had the rare distinction of coaching in the Messi and Friends game as 10 Northwestern alums were called in the last minute to save the internationally broadcast event from cancellation. One former alum, Matt Eliason, became a worldwide internet sensation after scoring on a full bicycle kick to upstage the great Messi in the goal of the day. The goal, which was the No. 1 play on Sports Center that day, would go on to generate over 4 million YouTube hits. Eliason, who had been an assistant vice president and investment analyst at GE Capital, quit his job to pursue a professional career. His journey was being covered by a movie production crew for the documentary "Messi and ME". Lenahan served as an assistant coach for both teams in the match and the film is now available on both Amazon Prime and Apple TV.

Lenahan’s former assistant coaches include Jeff Haines, Fernando Barboto, Dennis Bohn, Justin Serpone, Erik Ronning, Tom Carlin, Andy Fleming, Rich Nassif, Neil Jones, Mike Babst and Mark Plotkin. Jesse Marsch began his coaching career as a volunteer assistant at Northwestern under Lenahan while playing for the Chicago Fire. Santiago Solari, whom Lenahan had coached at Stockton University, was appointed head coach of Real Madrid in October 2018 and later coached Club América.[2]

His career coaching record ends at 305–215–79 (.575)
