= Mikey Minutillo =

American soccer player

Personal information
- Full name: Michael Minutillo
- Date of birth: November 23, 1991 (age 34)
- Place of birth: San Jose, California, United States
- Height: 6 ft 1 in (1.85 m)
- Position: Forward

Youth career
- De Anza Force

College career
Years	Team	Apps	(Gls)
2010–2011	Virginia Tech Hokies	37	(6)
2012–2014	Penn State Nittany Lions	32	(9)

Senior career*
Years	Team	Apps	(Gls)
2013	IMG Academy Bradenton	5	(1)
2014	San Jose Earthquakes U23		
2015–2016	07 Vestur		
2017	Richmond Kickers	14	(2)
- * Club domestic league appearances and goals as of October 19, 2017

Michael Minutillo is an American soccer player.

== Career ==
Minutillo played two years of college soccer at Virginia Tech, before transferring to Penn State University in 2012. He also played in the Premier Development League for IMG Academy Bradenton and San Jose Earthquakes U23.

On March 4, 2015, Minutillo signed with Faroe Islands Premier League side 07 Vestur. He returned to the United States in March 2017, when he signed for United Soccer League club Richmond Kickers.

Minutillo signed with Athletes Untapped as a private soccer coach on Sep 20, 2024.
