= 2014 NCAA Division I men's soccer tournament =

Men's College Cup (semifinals & final)

Tournament details
- Country: United States
- Teams: 48

Final positions
- Champions: Virginia
- Runners-up: UCLA
- Semifinalists: UMBC; Providence

Tournament statistics
- Matches played: 47
- Goals scored: 113 (2.4 per match)
- Top goal scorer(s): Andy Craven; North Carolina (4 goals)

Awards
- Best player: Mac Steeves; Providence (Off. MOP); Calle Brown; Virginia (Defense MOP)

The 2014 NCAA Division I men's soccer tournament is the 56th annual edition of the NCAA Division I Men's Soccer Championship tournament. The brackets for the tournament were announced on November 17, 2014, with each of the 48 participating teams gaining an invitation through either an automatic or at-large bid determined by the NCAA. The first, second, third, and quarterfinal rounds were held at college campus sites across the United States determined by seeding and record. The four-team College Cup finals tournament were held at WakeMed Soccer Park in Cary, North Carolina on December 12 and 14, 2014.

The Virginia Cavaliers won their seventh NCAA Championship title, defeating UCLA and avenging their loss to the Bruins in the championship game of the 1997 College Cup.

== Qualified teams ==
A total of 48 teams qualified into the tournament proper, either automatically, or through an at-large bid determined by a selection committee. Each conference that field varsity soccer teams was awarded one automatic berth into the tournament. Depending on the conference, that automatic berth was either given to the champions of the regular season, or the tournament that culminated the regular season. Twenty-four teams earned automatic bids into the tournament, while 24 entered through at-large bids.

Of the 23 schools that had previously won the championship, 13 qualified for the 2014 tournament.

== Format ==
Like previous editions of the NCAA Division I Tournament, the tournament featured 48 participants out of a possible field of 200 teams. Of the 48 berths, 24 were allocated to the conference tournament or regular season winners. The remaining 24 berths were supposed to be determined through an at-large process based upon the Ratings Percentage Index (RPI) of teams that did not automatically qualify.

The NCAA Selection Committee also named the top sixteen seeds for the tournament, with those teams receiving an automatic bye into the second round of the tournament. The remaining 32 teams played in a single-elimination match in the first round of the tournament for the right to play a seeded team in the second round.

=== Seeded teams ===
Seeded teams
Seed	School	Conference	Record	Berth type	NSCAA ranking	RPI ranking
1	Notre Dame	ACC	11–5–3	At-large	2	3
2	UCLA	Pac-12	10–4–4	At-large	6	1
3	Michigan State	Big Ten	11–4–5	At-large	12	5
4	Maryland	Big Ten	13–5–3	Automatic ^{A}	13	14
5	Indiana	Big Ten	12–4–5	At-large	7	8
6	Stanford	Pac-12	12–2–3	Automatic ^{B}	3	2
7	Clemson	ACC	12–6–2	Automatic ^{A}	14	11
8	Georgetown	Big East	12–4–4	At-large	8	7
9	Syracuse	ACC	15–3–1	At-large	1	12
10	Charlotte	C-USA	14–3–1	At-large	4	6
11	Providence	Big East	13–4–2	Automatic ^{A}	23	4
12	Creighton	Big East	14–3–2	At-large	5	9
13	Louisville	ACC	10–7–3	At-large	19	15
14	Washington	Pac-12	12–4–1	At-large	9	10
15	California	Pac-12	10–5–1	At-large	15	17
16	Virginia	ACC	11–5–2	At-large	20	13

- Automatic ^{A} = Conference tournament winner.
- Automatic ^{B} = Conference regular season champion, conference has no tournament.

== Schedule ==
Round	Date
First round	November 20, 2014
Second round	November 23, 2014
Third round	November 30, 2014
Quarterfinals	December 5 − 6, 2014
College Cup: Semifinals	December 12, 2014
College Cup Final	December 14, 2014

== Bracket ==
=== Regional 1 ===
First round
Ohio State	1(13)
Akron 2OT/PK	1(12)
UNC Wilmington	2
Bucknell	0
Penn State	2
Hartwick	1
Old Dominion	3
St. Francis Brooklyn	0

Second round
Ohio State	1
1	Notre Dame	2
16	Virginia	3
UNC Wilmington	1
Penn State	1
9	Syracuse	2
8	Georgetown 2OT	2
Old Dominion	1

Third round
1	Notre Dame	0
16	Virginia	1
9	Syracuse	1
8	Georgetown OT	2

Quarterfinals
16	Virginia 2OT/PK	1(5)
8	Georgetown	1(4)

=== Regional 2 ===
First round
Xavier 2OT	2
Monmouth	1
Oregon State	1
Denver	0
Saint Louis	2
Tulsa	0
Wake Forest	0(2)
UMBC 2OT/PK	0(3)

Second round
Xavier	2
5	Indiana	1
12	Creighton	1
Oregon State	0
Saint Louis	1
13	Louisville	2
4	Maryland	0
UMBC	1

Third round
Xavier	1
12	Creighton	2
13	Louisville	0
UMBC	1

Quarterfinals
12	Creighton	0(3)
UMBC 2OT/PK	0(4)

=== Regional 3 ===
First round
Kentucky	0
Oakland	2
UAB 2OT/PK	1(3)
Furman	1(4)
Dartmouth	2
Fordham	1
UC Irvine	3
UNLV	0

Second round
Oakland	0
3	Michigan State	1
14	Washington	0(6)
Furman 2OT/PK	0(5)
Dartmouth	0
11	Providence	3
6	Stanford	0
UC Irvine OT	1

Third round
3	Michigan State 2OT/PK	2(4)
14	Washington	2(3)
11	Providence	1
UC Irvine	0

Quarterfinals
3	Michigan State	2
11	Providence	3

=== Regional 4 ===
First round
Coastal Carolina	1
Florida Gulf Coast	0
North Carolina	6
James Madison	0
Northwestern	0
SIU Edwardsville	1
San Diego 2OT	2
Cal State Fullerton	1

Second round
Coastal Carolina	1
7	Clemson	2
10	Charlotte	1
North Carolina	2
SIU Edwardsville	0
15	California	1
2	UCLA OT	2
San Diego	1

Third round
7	Clemson	1
North Carolina	2
15	California	2
2	UCLA	3

Quarterfinals
North Carolina	3(6)
2	UCLA 2OT/PK	3(7)

- Coastal Carolina at Clemson was rescheduled for Monday the 24th due to inclement weather and unplayable field conditions.

=== College Cup – WakeMed Soccer Park, Cary, North Carolina ===
National Semifinals; December 12
16	Virginia	1
UMBC	0
11	Providence	2
2	UCLA 2OT	3

National Championship; December 14
16	Virginia 2OT/PK	0(4)
2	UCLA	0(2)

== Results ==
=== First round ===
November 20, 2014	Ohio State	1–1 (a.e.t.) (13–12 p)	Akron	Columbus, Ohio
5:00 EST	Culbertson 67'	Report	Najem 31'	Stadium: Jesse Owens Memorial Stadium; Attendance: 590; Referee: Chris Penso
	Penalties
	Jensen (penalty scored); Doyle (penalty scored); Moller (penalty missed); Soldat (penalty scored); Culbertson (penalty scored); Sarris (penalty scored); Mason (penalty scored); Kucharski (penalty scored); McCrary (penalty scored); Robertson (penalty scored); Jensen (penalty scored); Doyle (penalty missed); Culbertson (penalty scored); Sarris (penalty scored); Mason (penalty scored)		(penalty scored) Najem; (penalty scored) Sepe; (penalty missed) Holthusen; (penalty scored) Dakwar; (penalty scored) Caso; (penalty scored) Dambrot; (penalty scored) Quirk; (penalty scored) Dos Santos; (penalty scored) Abdul-Salaam; (penalty scored) Ruhaak; (penalty scored) Najem; (penalty missed) Sepe; (penalty scored) Caso; (penalty scored) Dakwar; (penalty missed) Dambrot

November 20, 2014	Dartmouth	2–1	Fordham	Hanover, New Hampshire
5:00 EST	Alnas 61'; Adelabu 86'	Report	Bazzini 79'	Stadium: Burnham Field; Attendance: 1,057

November 20, 2014	Northwestern	0–1	SIU Edwardsville	Evanston, Illinois
5:30 EST		Report	Scheipeter 81'	Stadium: Lakeside Field; Attendance: 255; Referee: Dimitar Chavdarov

November 20, 2014	Coastal Carolina	1–0	Florida Gulf Coast	Conway, South Carolina
6:00 EST	Melchor 86'	Report		Stadium: CCU Soccer Field; Attendance: 238; Referee: Bill Dittmar

November 20, 2014	UAB	1–1 (a.e.t.) (3–4 p)	Furman	Birmingham, Alabama
6:30 EST	Svantesson 14'	Report	Hawke 38'	Stadium: West Campus Field; Attendance: 1,173; Referee: Shane Butler
	Penalties
	Ruiz (penalty scored); Navarrete (penalty scored); Clay (penalty missed); Svantesson (penalty scored); Dajani (penalty missed)		(penalty scored) Ritter; (penalty scored) Hawke; (penalty scored) Santibanez; (penalty scored) Pahl

November 20, 2014	UNC Wilmington	2–0	Bucknell	Wilmington, North Carolina
7:00 EST	Kromer 67'; Escobar 68'	Report		Stadium: UNCW Soccer Stadium; Attendance: 2,020; Referee: Dustin Thorne

November 20, 2014	Penn State	2–1	Hartwick	State College, Pennsylvania
7:00 EST	Minutillo 60'; Gravatt 74'	Report	Beckford 46'	Stadium: Jeffrey Field; Attendance: 377; Referee: John Brady

November 20, 2014	Old Dominion	3–0	St. Francis (Brooklyn)	Norfolk, Virginia
7:00 EST	Rivera 29' (pen.), 67'; Condotta 48'	Report		Stadium: ODU Soccer Complex; Referee: Mark Gorak

November 20, 2014	Xavier	2–1 (a.e.t.)	Monmouth	Cincinnati, Ohio
7:00 EST	Walker 15'; Ridsdale 103'	Report	Agyemang 39'	Stadium: XU Soccer Complex; Attendance: 573; Referee: Ben Trevino

November 20, 2014	Wake Forest	0–0 (a.e.t.) (2–3 p)	UMBC	Winston-Salem, North Carolina
7:00 EST		Report		Stadium: Spry Stadium; Attendance: 909; Referee: Carmen Serbio
	Penalties
	Harkes (penalty missed); Rhode (penalty scored); Bakero (penalty missed); Hayes (penalty scored); Odenbeck (penalty missed)		(penalty missed) Kansaye; (penalty scored) Caltabiano; (penalty scored) Becker; (penalty scored) Scott; (penalty missed) Banjo

November 20, 2014	Kentucky	0–2	Oakland	Lexington, Kentucky
7:00 EST		Report	Archibald 55'; Hoy 61'	Stadium: Bell Soccer Complex; Attendance: 502; Referee: Brandon Artis

November 20, 2014	North Carolina	6–0	James Madison	Chapel Hill, North Carolina
7:00 EST	Craven 42', 50', 74'; Lovejoy 47'; Winn 79'; Long 86'	Report		Stadium: Fetzer Field; Attendance: 511; Referee: Mohammad Samadpour

November 20, 2014	Oregon State	1–0	Denver	Corvallis, Oregon
8:00 EST	Jones 17'	Report		Stadium: Lorenz Field; Attendance: 953; Referee: Chipalo Street

November 20, 2014	Saint Louis	2–0	Tulsa	St. Louis, Missouri
8:00 EST	Bryce 63'; Kristo 88'	Report		Stadium: Hermann Stadium; Attendance: 1,057; Referee: Keith Angel

November 20, 2014	UC Irvine	3–0	UNLV	Irvine, California
10:00 EST	Iwasa 7', 36'; Martinez 76'	Report		Stadium: Anteater Stadium; Attendance: 757; Referee: Alex Gorin

November 20, 2014	San Diego	2–1 (a.e.t.)	Cal State Fullerton	San Diego, California
10:00 EST	Smith 89' (pen.); Musambi 103' (pen.)	Report	I. Ramos 13'	Stadium: Torero Stadium; Attendance: 952; Referee: Frank Anderson

=== Second round ===
November 23, 2014	#16 Virginia	3–1	UNC Wilmington	Charlottesville, Virginia
1:00 EST	Hayward 44'; Rozhansky 62'; McCord 74'	Report	Sizemore 20'	Stadium: Klöckner Stadium; Attendance: 677; Referee: John McCloskey

November 23, 2014	#8 Georgetown	2–1 (a.e.t.)	Old Dominion	Washington, D.C.
1:00 EST	Allen 74'; Basuljevic 110'	Report	OG 26'	Stadium: Shaw Field; Attendance: 920; Referee: Andrew Chapin

November 23, 2014	#5 Indiana	1–2	Xavier	Bloomington, Indiana
1:00 EST	Lillard 34'	Report	Vasquenza 29'; Walker 74' (pen.)	Stadium: Bill Armstrong Stadium; Attendance: 719; Referee: Cesar Ibarra

November 23, 2014	#3 Michigan State	1–0	Oakland	East Lansing, Michigan
1:00 EST	Carroll 67'	Report		Stadium: DeMartin Soccer Complex; Attendance: 801; Referee: Hilario Grajeda

November 23, 2014	#12 Creighton	1–0	Oregon State	Omaha, Nebraska
1:30 EST	Stauffer 50'	Report		Stadium: Morrison Stadium; Attendance: 1,275; Referee: Fotis Bazakos

November 23, 2014	#9 Syracuse	2–1	Penn State	Syracuse, New York
2:00 EST	Ekblom 74'; Alseth 84'	Report	Maloney 60' (pen.)	Stadium: SU Soccer Stadium; Attendance: 1,213; Referee: Mark Allatin

November 23, 2014	#10 Charlotte	1–2	North Carolina	Charlotte, North Carolina
2:00 EST	George 53' (o.g.)	Report	Engel 27', 89'	Stadium: Transamerica Field; Attendance: 1,000; Referee: Ted Unkel

November 23, 2014	#15 California	1–0	SIU Edwardsville	Berkeley, California
4:00 EST	Sekine 71'	Report		Stadium: Edwards Stadium; Attendance: 831; Referee: Daniel Radford

November 23, 2014	#4 Maryland	0–1	UMBC	College Park, Maryland
5:00 EST		Report	Harris 70'	Stadium: Ludwig Field; Attendance: 3,776; Referee: Mark Kadlecik

November 23, 2014	#13 Louisville	2–1	Saint Louis	Louisville, Kentucky
6:00 EST	Brody 71'; Kubel 87'	Report	Vizcaino 68'	Stadium: Lynn Stadium; Attendance: 1,714; Referee: Jorge Cuate

November 23, 2014	#1 Notre Dame	2–1	Ohio State	Notre Dame, Indiana
7:00 EST	Aubrey 30' (pen.); Gallagher 69'	Report	Jensen 34'	Stadium: Alumni Stadium; Attendance: 404; Referee: Sorin Stoica

November 23, 2014	#11 Providence	3–0	Dartmouth	Providence, Rhode Island
7:00 EST	Steeves 48'; D. Machado 56', 79'	Report		Stadium: Hendricken Field; Attendance: 762; Referee: Brian Dunn

November 23, 2014	#14 Washington	0–0 (a.e.t.) (6–5 p)	Furman	Seattle, Washington
8:00 EST		Report		Stadium: Husky Soccer Stadium; Attendance: 1,444; Referee: Josh Wilkens
	Penalties
	Schmidt (penalty missed); Roldan (penalty missed); Robertson (penalty missed); Lange (penalty scored); Moberg (penalty scored); Wright (penalty scored); Richey (penalty scored); Wingo (penalty scored); Blanchard (penalty scored)		(penalty scored) Ritter; (penalty missed) Hawke; (penalty missed) Santibanez; (penalty scored) Pahl; (penalty missed) Ortiz; (penalty scored) Pinner; (penalty scored) McInnis; (penalty scored) Lissek; (penalty missed) Richardson

November 23, 2014	#6 Stanford	0–1 (a.e.t.)	UC Irvine	Stanford, California
8:00 EST		Report	Sperber 97'	Stadium: Laird Q. Cagan Stadium; Attendance: 1,053; Referee: Frank Anderson

November 23, 2014	#2 UCLA	2–1 (a.e.t.)	San Diego	Los Angeles, California
10:00 EST	Stolz 55', 97'	Report	Price 20'	Stadium: Drake Stadium; Attendance: 1,116; Referee: Ian Anderson

November 24, 2014	#7 Clemson	2–1	Coastal Carolina	Clemson, South Carolina
6:00 EST	Clowes 45'; Campos 57'	Report	Gudmundsson 62'	Stadium: Riggs Field; Attendance: 2,570; Referee: Carmen Serbio

=== Third round ===
November 30, 2014	#8 Georgetown	2–1 (a.e.t.)	#9 Syracuse	Washington, D.C.
1:00 EST	Rosenberry 80'; Rist 94'	Report	Halis 55'	Stadium: Shaw Field; Attendance: 1,505; Referee: Mark Gorak

November 30, 2014	#3 Michigan State	2–2 (a.e.t.) (4–3 p)	#14 Washington	East Lansing, Michigan
1:00 EST	Jackson 76' (o.g.); Kreutz 88'	Report	Moberg 66'; Wright 73'	Stadium: DeMartin Soccer Complex; Attendance: 725; Referee: Fotis Bazakos
	Penalties
	Carroll (penalty scored); Stacy (penalty scored); Montague (penalty scored); Myers (penalty missed); Alashe (penalty scored)		(penalty scored) Roldan; (penalty missed) Schmidt; (penalty scored) Moberg; (penalty scored) Lange; (penalty missed) Jones

November 30, 2014	#12 Creighton	2–1	Xavier	Omaha, Nebraska
2:00 EST	Herbers 43'; Castellanos 62'	Report	C. Brown 70'	Stadium: Morrison Stadium; Attendance: 1,044; Referee: Alex Gorin

November 30, 2014	#13 Louisville	0–1	UMBC	Louisville, Kentucky
6:00 EST		Report	Kansaye 24' (pen.)	Stadium: Lynn Stadium; Attendance: 2,723; Referee: Shane Butler

November 30, 2014	#7 Clemson	1–2	North Carolina	Clemson, South Carolina
6:00 EST	Fisher 24' (pen.)	Report	Lovejoy 13', 71'	Stadium: Riggs Field; Attendance: 4,241; Referee: Mark Kadlecik

November 30, 2014	#1 Notre Dame	0–1	#16 Virginia	Notre Dame, Indiana
7:00 EST		Report	Corriveau 82'	Stadium: Alumni Stadium; Attendance: 412; Referee: Brent Sorg

November 30, 2014	#11 Providence	1–0	UC Irvine	Providence, Rhode Island
7:00 EST	Naglestad 77'	Report		Stadium: Hendricken Field; Attendance: 696; Referee: Alex Chilowicz

November 30, 2014	#2 UCLA	3–2	#15 California	Los Angeles, California
10:00 EST	Gaspar 30'; Iloski 35'; Vale 55'	Report	Hallisey 49'; Bonomo 73'	Stadium: Drake Stadium; Attendance: 765; Referee: Hector Perez

=== Quarterfinals ===
December 5, 2014	#12 Creighton	0–0 (a.e.t.) (3–4 p)	UMBC	Omaha, Nebraska
8:00 EST		Report		Stadium: Morrison Stadium; Attendance: 2,407; Referee: Edvin Jurisevic
	Penalties
	Herbers (penalty missed); DeJulio (penalty missed); Stauffer (penalty scored); Abidor (penalty scored); Ribas (penalty scored)		(penalty scored) Kansaye; (penalty missed) Caltabiano; (penalty scored) Becker; (penalty scored) Scott; (penalty scored) Banjo

December 6, 2014	#3 Michigan State	2–3	#11 Providence	East Lansing, Michigan
12:00 EST	Montague 8'; Chapman 71'	Report	Neustädter 37'; D. Machado 42'; F. Machado 62'	Stadium: DeMartin Soccer Complex; Attendance: 1,534; Referee: Mark Kadlecik

December 6, 2014	#8 Georgetown	1–1 (a.e.t.) (4–5 p)	#16 Virginia	Washington, D.C.
1:00 EST	Martz 59'	Report	Wharton 90'	Stadium: Shaw Field; Attendance: 2,232; Referee: Hilario Grajeda
	Penalties
	Allen (penalty scored); Rosenberry (penalty scored); Rudy (penalty scored); Yaro (penalty scored); Basuljevic (penalty missed)		(penalty scored) Wharton; (penalty scored) Foss; (penalty scored) Thomsen; (penalty scored) Heyward; (penalty scored) Lennon

December 6, 2014	#2 UCLA	3–3 (a.e.t.) (7–6 p)	North Carolina	Los Angeles, California
8:00 EST	Iloski 69'; Chavez 70'; Danladi 75'	Report	Holness 40'; Engel 78'; Craven 79'	Stadium: Drake Stadium; Attendance: 1,580; Referee: Alex Gorin
	Penalties
	Iloski (penalty missed); Raygoza (penalty scored); Zerboni (penalty scored); Ndjock (penalty scored); Stolz (penalty scored); Vale (penalty scored); Amick (penalty scored); Gaspar (penalty scored)		(penalty scored) George; (penalty scored) Lovejoy; (penalty scored) Välimaa; (penalty scored) October; (penalty missed) Long; (penalty scored) Craven; (penalty scored) Walden; (penalty missed) Marshall

=== College Cup ===
==== Semifinals ====
December 12, 2014	#16 Virginia	1–0	UMBC	Cary, North Carolina
5:00 EST	Madison 5'	Report		Stadium: WakeMed Soccer Park; Attendance: 9,502; Referee: Chris Penso

December 12, 2014	#2 UCLA	3–2 (a.e.t.)	#11 Providence	Cary, North Carolina
7:30 EST	Ndjock 43', 81'; Gaspar 105'	Report	Steeves 65', 74'	Stadium: WakeMed Soccer Park; Attendance: 9,502; Referee: Ted Unkel

==== Championship ====
December 14, 2014
12:00 EST

#2 UCLA	0–0 (a.e.t.)	#16 Virginia
	Report 1 Report 2
Penalties
Iloski (penalty scored); Zerboni (penalty missed); Reygoza (penalty missed); Ndjock (penalty scored)	2–4	(penalty scored) Wharton; (penalty missed) Thomsen; (penalty scored) Hayward; (penalty scored) Foss; (penalty scored) Lennon

WakeMed Soccer Park, Cary, NC
Attendance: 8,015
Referee: Edvin Jurisevic

Team details

UCLA
Virginia

== Statistics ==
=== Goalscorers ===
4 goals

- (United States) Andy Craven — North Carolina

3 goals

- (United States) Rob Lovejoy — North Carolina
- (United States) Tyler Engel — North Carolina
- (United States) Mac Steeves — Providence

2 goals

- (United States) Sidney Rivera — Old Dominion
- (United States) Dominik Machado — Providence
- (United States) Cameron Iwasa — UC Irvine
- (United States) Chase Gaspar — UCLA
- (United States) Brian Iloski — UCLA
- (Germany) Larry Ndjock — UCLA
- (Germany) Leo Stolz — UCLA
- (United States) Will Walker — Xavier

1 goal

- (United States) Adam Najem — Akron
- (Mexico) Ian Ramos — Cal State Fullerton
- (United States) Stefano Bonomo — California
- (United States) Connor Hallisey — California
- (United States) Bobby Sekine — California
- (Costa Rica) Diego Campos — Clemson
- (England) Paul Clowes — Clemson
- (United States) Kyle Fisher — Clemson
- (United States) Tommy Gudmundsson — Coastal Carolina
- (United States) Martin Melchor — Coastal Carolina
- (United States) Fernando Castellanos — Creighton
- (Germany) Fabian Herbers — Creighton
- (United States) Lucas Stauffer — Creighton
- (United States) Alex Adelabu — Dartmouth
- (United States) Robin Alnas — Dartmouth
- (United States) Christopher Bazzini — Fordham
- (Scotland) Lewis Hawke — Furman
- (United States) Brandon Allen — Georgetown
- (United States) Arun Basuljevic — Georgetown
- (United States) Austin Martz — Georgetown
- (United States) Jared Rist — Georgetown
- (United States) Keegan Rosenberry — Georgetown
- (Jamaica) Jhevaughn Beckford — Hartwick
- (United States) Grant Lillard — Indiana
- (United States) Andrew Brody — Louisville
- (Germany) Tim Kübel — Louisville
- (United States) Zach Carroll — Michigan State
- (Canada) Jay Chapman — Michigan State
- (United States) Tim Kreutz — Michigan State
- (United States) Adam Montague — Michigan State
- (Ghana) Emmanuel Agyemang — Monmouth
- (Jamaica) Omar Holness — North Carolina
- (United States) Glen Long — North Carolina
- (United States) Alan Winn — North Carolina
- (United States) Brandon Aubrey — Notre Dame
- (Republic of Ireland) Jon Gallagher — Notre Dame
- (United States) Cody Archibald — Oakland
- (Canada) Gavin Hoy — Oakland
- (United States) Kyle Culbertson — Ohio State
- (United States) Danny Jensen — Ohio State
- (United States) Ryan Condotta — Old Dominion
- (United States) Jordan Jones — Oregon State
- (United States) Brett Gravatt — Penn State
- (United States) Connor Maloney — Penn State
- (United States) Mikey Minutillo — Penn State
- (Brazil) Fabio Machado — Providence
- (Norway) Markus Naglestad — Providence
- (Germany) Daniel Neustädter — Providence
- (United States) Kingsley Bryce — Saint Louis
- (United States) Robert Kristo — Saint Louis
- (United States) Francisco Vizcaino — Saint Louis
- (Canada) Dave Musambi — San Diego
- (United States) Parker Price — San Diego
- (United States) Keegan Smith — San Diego
- (United States) Paul Scheipeter — SIU Edwardsville
- (Norway) Øyvind Alseth — Syracuse
- (Norway) Emil Ekblom — Syracuse
- (Canada) Alex Halis — Syracuse
- (United States) Ian Svantesson — UAB
- (United States) Dennis Martinez — UC Irvine
- (United States) Michael Sperber — UC Irvine
- (United States) Christian Chavez — UCLA
- (Ghana) Abu Danladi — UCLA
- (New Zealand) Jordan Vale — UCLA
- (United States) Malcolm Harris — UMBC
- (Mali) Mamadou Kansaye — UMBC
- (Colombia) Daniel Escobar — UNC Wilmington
- (United States) Kalvin Kromer — UNC Wilmington
- (United States) David Sizemore — UNC Wilmington
- (United States) Nicko Corriveau — Virginia
- (United States) Sam Heyward — Virginia
- (United States) Darius Madison — Virginia
- (United States) Kyle McCord — Virginia
- (United States) Jake Rozhansky — Virginia
- (United States) Todd Wharton — Virginia
- (United States) James Moberg — Washington
- (United States) Steven Wright — Washington
- (United States) Cory Brown — Xavier
- (New Zealand) Alex Ridsdale — Xavier
- (United States) Matt Vasquenza — Xavier

Own goals

- (Sweden) Raby George — North Carolina (playing against Charlotte)
- (United States) Garrett Jackson — Washington (playing against Michigan State)
- Georgetown (playing against Old Dominion)
