= Ohio State Buckeyes men's soccer =

Men's soccer team of Ohio State University

- 2026 Ohio State Buckeyes men's soccer team
- Founded: 1953; 73 years ago
- University: Ohio State University
- Head coach: Brian Maisonneuve (9th season)
- Conference: Big Ten
- Location: Columbus, Ohio, US
- Stadium: Jesse Owens Memorial Stadium (capacity: 10,000)
- Nickname: Buckeyes
- Colors: Scarlet and white
Home	Away

NCAA tournament runner-up
- 2007

NCAA tournament College Cup
- 2007, 2024

NCAA tournament Quarterfinals
- 2007, 2024

NCAA tournament Round of 16
- 2004, 2007, 2010, 2015, 2024

NCAA tournament appearances
- 2000, 2001, 2004, 2005, 2007, 2008, 2009, 2010, 2014, 2015, 2022, 2024

Conference tournament championships
- 2000, 2007, 2009, 2024

Conference regular season championships
- 2004, 2009, 2015, 2024

The Ohio State Buckeyes men's soccer team is the program that is representing Ohio State University in NCAA Division I men's college soccer competitions. The team is a member of the Big Ten Conference.

Ohio State has an overall record of 456–516–123 (.473) in their 68-year history. They have appeared in the NCAA Division I Men's Soccer Tournament 12 times including a runner-up finish in the 2007 NCAA Division I Men's Soccer Tournament.

The Buckeyes have participated in the Big Ten Conference since the conference began sponsoring men's soccer in 1991. Since then, they have been 76–92–18 (.457) in the conference. The team has four regular season titles (2004, '09, '15, '24) and four conference tournament titles (2000, '07, '09, '24).

The team has played their home games at Jesse Owens Memorial Stadium since 1999. The facility has a Natural Grass surface and has a capacity of 8,000.

Brian Maisonneuve has been the head coach of the Buckeyes since 2018. He previously served as an assistant coach for the Indiana Hoosiers from 2010 to 2017 and played for the Columbus Crew from 1996 to 2004.

== Current roster ==
As of 12 Sep 2024

Note: Flags indicate national team as defined under FIFA eligibility rules; some limited exceptions apply. Players may hold more than one non-FIFA nationality.

No.	Pos.	Nation	Player
1	GK	MEX	Max Trejo
2	DF	USA	Dyland Onwona
3	DF	CAN	Nathan Demian
4	DF	USA	Nick McHenry
5	MF	GIB	Johnny Rush
6	DF	GER	Thomas Gilej
7	MF	ENG	Marko Borkovic
8	MF	USA	Andre Roberts
9	FW	USA	Tanner Creech
10	MF	USA	Parker Grinstead
11	MF	USA	Luciano Pechota
12	DF	USA	Deylen Vellios
14	MF	USA	Nick Skubis
15	MF	USA	Ashton Bilow

No.	Pos.	Nation	Player
16	MF	USA	Anthony Samways
17	MF	NGR	Michael Adedokun
18	FW	USA	David Ajagbe
20	MF	USA	Jacob Maisonneuve
21	MF	USA	Tommaso Villa
23	DF	USA	Donovan Williams
24	GK	USA	RJ Stoller
25	FW	ENG	Michael Ndiweni
26	MF	USA	Cole Evans
28	GK	USA	Luke Laramore
29	FW	USA	Zsombor Onodi
30	DF	ISL	Siggi Magnússon
32	GK	USA	Patrick McLaughlin

== Seasons ==
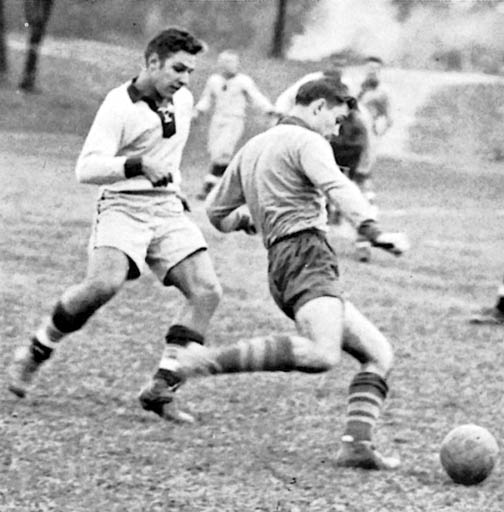
Ohio State v Oberlin College match, 1955

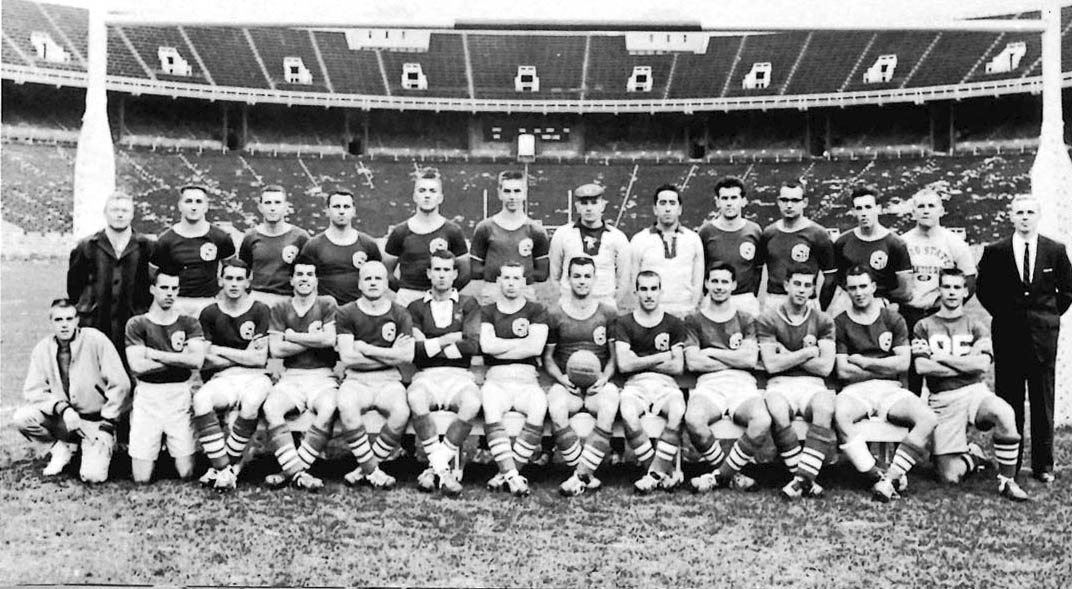
Ohio State full roster of 1961

Year	Head coach	Overall Record	Conference Record	Standing	Postseason
Bruce Bennett (Independent) (1953–1953)
1953	Bruce Bennett	3–6–1			
Bruce Bennett:		3–6–1			
Howard Knuttgen (Independent) (1954–1957)
1954	Howard Knuttgen	3–6–1			
1955	Howard Knuttgen	5–3–1			
1955	Howard Knuttgen	5–3–1			
1956	Howard Knuttgen	7–3–0			
1957	Howard Knuttgen	3–6–0			
Howard Knuttgen:		18–18–2			
Walter Ersing (Independent) (1958–1968)
1958	Walter Ersing	3–5–1			
1959	Walter Ersing	1–8–0			
1960	Walter Ersing	3–4–1			
1961	Walter Ersing	0–7–1			
1962	Walter Ersing	3–5–0			
1963	Walter Ersing	2–5–2			
1964	Walter Ersing	3–6–0			
1965	Walter Ersing	5–4–0			
1966	Walter Ersing	3–6–0			
1967	Walter Ersing	7–2–0			
1968	Walter Ersing	2–7–0			
Walter Ersing:		32–59–5			
Forrest Tyson (Independent) (1969–1970)
1969	Forrest Tyson	2–6–1			
1970	Forrest Tyson	2–6–2			
Forrest Tyson:		4–12–3			
Bill Servedio (Independent) (1971–1973)
1971	Bill Servedio	4–5–2			
1972	Bill Servedio	0–9–2			
1973	Bill Servedio	2–3–5			
Al Bianco (Independent) (1974–1974)
1974	Al Bianco	11–6–3			
Bill Servedio (Independent) (1975–1975)
1975	Bill Servedio	5–6–2			
Bill Servedio:		11–23–11			
Jerry Bell (Independent) (1976–1978)
1976	Jerry Bell	6–6–1			
1977	Jerry Bell	10–4–0			
1978	Jerry Bell	5–9–2			
Jerry Bell:		21–19–3			
Al Bianco (Independent) (1979–1986)
1979	Al Bianco	7–8–1			
1980	Al Bianco	11–6–3			
1981	Al Bianco	7–9–4			
1982	Al Bianco	11–7–2			
1983	Al Bianco	10–11–0			
1984	Al Bianco	7–12–2			
1985	Al Bianco	7–12–2			
1986	Al Bianco	12–5–3			
Al Bianco:		83–76–20			
Gary Avedikian (Independent) (1987–1990)
1987	Gary Avedikian	11–9–2			
1988	Gary Avedikian	7–12–1			
1989	Gary Avedikian	5–12–2			
1990	Gary Avedikian	10–8–3			
Gary Avedikian (Big Ten Conference) (1991–1996)
1991	Gary Avedikian	4–16–0	1–4–0	5th	
1992	Gary Avedikian	8–11–2	3–2–0	T–3rd	
1993	Gary Avedikian	5–13–2	0–5–0	6th	
1994	Gary Avedikian	8–11–1	2–3–0	T–3rd	
1995	Gary Avedikian	7–11–1	1–4–0	5th	
1996	Gary Avedikian	7–8–3	2–2–1	T–3rd	
Gary Avedikian:		89–111–17	9–17–1		
John Bluem (Big Ten Conference) (1997–2017)
1997	John Bluem	11–7–2	3–1–1	2nd	
1998	John Bluem	8–9–3	3–2–0	3rd	
1999	John Bluem	11–8–0	3–2–0	T-2nd	
2000	John Bluem	12–5–4	2–2–1	T-4th	NCAA First Round
2001	John Bluem	10–7–2	1–4–1	6th	NCAA First Round
2002	John Bluem	11–7–1	3–3–0	T-2nd	
2003	John Bluem	4–12–4	2–3–1	4th	
2004	John Bluem	12–7–2	5–1–0	T-1st	NCAA Third Round
2005	John Bluem	11–8–2	3–2–1	2nd	NCAA First Round
2006	John Bluem	11–7–3	3–2–1	2nd	
2007	John Bluem	17–4–5	4–1–1	2nd	NCAA Runner-Up
2008	John Bluem	9–9–3	2–4–0	T-5th	NCAA Second Round
2009	John Bluem	12–5–4	4–2–0	1st	NCAA Second Round
2010	John Bluem	11–8–3	4–2–0	T-2nd	NCAA Third Round
2011	John Bluem	10–7–2	4–2–0	T-2nd	
2012	John Bluem	6–10–3	0–4–2	7th	
2013	John Bluem	5–8–5	1–3–2	6th	
2014	John Bluem	9–8–5	5–3–0	T-2nd	NCAA Second Round
2015	John Bluem	13–7–3	5–2–1	1st	NCAA Third Round
2016	John Bluem	5–13–1	3–4–1	T-6th	
2017	John Bluem	8–10–1	5–5–1	6th	
John Bluem:		206–161–58	63–54–13		
Brian Maisonneuve (Big Ten Conference) (2018–present)
2018	Brian Maisonneuve	1–15–2	0–7–1	9th	
2019	Brian Maisonneuve	7–11–1	1–6–1	T-8th	
2020	Brian Maisonneuve	3–6–1	3–5–1	7th	
2021	Brian Maisonneuve	6–9–1	2–6–0	9th	
2022	Brian Maisonneuve	10–3–5	4–2–2	T–2nd	NCAA Tournament Second Round
2023	Brian Maisonneuve	6–6–5	3–4–1	T–7th	
2024	Brian Maisonneuve	12–1–3	7–1–2	1st	NCAA College Cup Semi Final
Brian Maisonneuve:		45–51–18	20–31–10		
Total:		435–401–90			
National champion Postseason invitational champion Conference regular season champion Conference regular season and conference tournament champion Division regular season champion Division regular season and conference tournament champion Conference tournament champion

== Team management ==
=== Head coaching history ===
These people served as the head coach for Ohio State's men's soccer program.

Years	Coach	Overall	Conference
1953	Bruce Bennett	3–6–1 (.350)	
1954–1957	Howard Knuttgen	18–18–2 (.500)	
1958–1968	Walter Ersing	32–59–5 (.359)	
1969–1970	Forrest Tyson	4–12–3 (.289)	
1971–1973; 1975	Bill Servedio	11–23–11 (.367)	
1974; 1979–1986	Al Bianco	83–76–20 (.520)	
1976–1978	Jerry Bell	21–19–3 (.523)	
1987–1996	Gary Avendikian	89–111–17 (.449)	9–17–1 (.352)
1997–2017	John Bluem	206–161–58 (.553)	63–54–13 (.535)
2018–present	Brian Maisonneuve	33–50–10 (.409)	13–30–8 (.333)

== NCAA Tournament Results ==
Year	Round	Opponent	Result
2000	First Round	Creighton	L, 0–1
2001	First Round	American	L, 1–2
2004	First Round	Memphis	W, 1–0
2004	Second Round	Notre Dame	W, 2–1
2004	Third Round	Duke	L, 0–3
2005	First Round	Santa Clara	L, 0–1
2007	Second Round	Louisville	W, 1–0
2007	Third Round	UC Santa Barbara	W, 4–3^{2OT}
2007	Quarterfinals	Bradley	W, 4–0
2007	Semifinals	Massachusetts	W, 1–0
2007	Finals	Wake Forest	L, 1–2
2008	First Round	Oakland	W, 0–0^{4–3 PK}
2008	Second Round	Akron	L, 0–1^{2OT}
2009	Second Round	Drake	L, 0–1^{OT}
2010	Second Round	Providence	W, 2–1
2010	Third Round	Louisville	L, 1–2
2014	First Round	Akron	W, 1–1^{13–12 PK}
2014	Second Round	Notre Dame	L, 1–2
2015	Second Round	Dayton	W, 1–1^{4–3 PK}
2015	Third Round	Stanford	L, 3–1
2022	First Round	Wake Forest	W, 3–0
2022	Second Round	UNC Greensboro	L, 1–1^{5–6 PK}
2024	Second Round	Western Michigan	W, 2-1
2024	Third Round	Stanford	T, 0-0^{4-2 PK}
2024	Quarterfinals	Wake Forest	W, 3-0
2024	College Cup Semi Finals	Marshall	L, 0-1

== Awards and honors ==
=== Team ===
- NCAA Division I Men's Soccer Championship
  - Runners-Up (1): 2007

==== Big Ten Regular Season Championships ====
Season	Coach	Overall record	Big Ten record
2004	John Bluem	12–7–2	5–1–0
2009	John Bluem	12–5–4	4–2–0
2015	John Bluem	13–7–3	5–2–1
2024	Brian Maisonneuve	12–1–3	7–1–2
Big Ten Regular Season Championships			4

==== Big Ten Tournament Championships ====
Season	Coach	Location	Opponent	Score
2000	John Bluem	Columbus, OH	Penn State	3–2^{OT}
2007	John Bluem	East Lansing, MI	Indiana	0–0^{5–4PK}
2009	John Bluem	Bloomington, IN	Penn State	1–0
2024	Brian Maisonneuve	Columbus, OH	Michigan	1–0
Big Ten Tournament Championships				4

=== Individual ===
- Hermann Trophy
  - 2024: Michael Adedokun
- All-Americans
  - Rich Nichols (LHB), 1951 Second Team
  - Eugene Bak (RHB), 1954 Honorable Mention
  - Richard Bertz (CHB), 1955 Honorable Mention
  - Richard Bertz (IR), 1956 Honorable Mention
  - Gunars Neiders (FB), 1956 Honorable Mention
  - Hans Lesheim (CF), 1957 Honorable Mention
  - Robert Black (GK), 1967 Honorable Mention
  - Justin Cook (F), 2004 Third Team
  - Xavier Balc (F), 2007 First Team
  - Eric Brunner (D), 2007 First Team
  - Liam Doyle (D), 2015 Third Team
  - Michael Adedokun (MF), 2024 First Team
  - Siggi Magnusson (D), 2024 First Team
- Big Ten Player of the Year
  - 2004: Justin Cook
  - 2007: Xavier Balc
- Big Ten Defensive Player of the Year
  - 2009: Doug Verhoff
  - 2010: David Tiemstra
  - 2011: David Tiemstra
  - 2015: Liam Doyle
- Big Ten Offensive Player of the Year
  - 2011: Chris Hegngi
- Big Ten Goalkeeper of the Year
  - 2015: Chris Froschauer
  - 2022: Keagan McLaughlin
- Big Ten Midfielder Player of the Year
  - 2022: Laurence Wootton
  - 2023: Laurence Wootton
  - 2024: Michael Adedokun
- Big Ten Freshman of the Year
  - 1998: John Monebrake
  - 1999: John Tomaino
  - 2000: Justin Cook
  - 2009: Matt Lampson
  - 2021: Laurence Wootton
- Big Ten Coach of the Year
  - 1992: Gary Avedikian
  - 1999: John Bluem
  - 2004: John Bluem
  - 2009: John Bluem
  - 2014: John Bluem
  - 2024: Brian Maisonneuve
