= Northwestern Wildcats men's soccer =

American college soccer team

- Founded: 1980; 46 years ago
- University: Northwestern University
- Head coach: Russell Payne (5th season)
- Conference: Big Ten
- Location: Evanston, Illinois, US
- Stadium: Lanny and Sharon Martin Stadium (capacity: 3,000)
- Nickname: Cats
- Colors: Purple and black
Home	Away

NCAA tournament Quarterfinals
- 2006, 2008

NCAA tournament Round of 16
- 2006, 2008, 2009, 2012

NCAA tournament Round of 32
- 2004, 2006, 2007, 2008, 2009, 2012

NCAA tournament appearances
- 2004, 2006, 2007, 2008, 2009, 2011, 2012, 2013, 2014

Conference tournament championships
- 2011

The Northwestern Wildcats men's soccer team is a varsity intercollegiate athletic team of Northwestern University in Evanston, Illinois, United States. The team is a member of the Big Ten Conference, which is part of the National Collegiate Athletic Association's Division I. Northwestern's first men's soccer team was fielded in 1980. The team plays its home games at Martin Stadium in Evanston, which opened in 2016. The Cats are coached by Russell Payne.

== Current squad ==
As of February 13, 2022

Note: Flags indicate national team as defined under FIFA eligibility rules; some limited exceptions apply. Players may hold more than one non-FIFA nationality.

No.	Pos.	Nation	Player
0	GK	USA	Ethan Bandre
1	GK	SRB	Miha Mišković
2	DF	USA	Quinn Dudek
3	DF	USA	Ibrahim Obeid
4	MF	USA	Collin McCamy
5	MF	USA	Richie Bennett
6	FW	USA	Justin Weiss
7	FW	USA	Bardia Kimiavi
8	FW	USA	Spencer Howard
9	FW	ESP	Jose del Valle
10	MF	CHI	Vicente Castro
11	MF	NED	Eric Smits
12	MF	USA	Logan Weaver
13	MF	USA	Connor McCabe
14	MF	USA	Tyler Warren
15	MF	HAI	Darley Florvil

No.	Pos.	Nation	Player
16	MF	USA	Alex Gordon
17	MF	ISR	Rom Brown
18	MF	USA	Joseph Arena
19	MF	USA	Paul Son
21	DF	USA	Jack Ratterman
22	DF	USA	Jayson Cyrus
23	DF	USA	Spencer Farina
24	DF	ENG	Deng Deng Kur
25	DF	USA	Julian Zighelboim
27	GK	USA	Kevin Klausz
28	MF	USA	Caden Theobald
29	MF	USA	Danh Tran

== Coaching staff ==
- Head coach: Russell Payne
- Associate Head Coach: Krystian Witkowski
- Assistant coach: Ricardo Pinto
- Volunteer Assistant Coach: Jonathan Bornstein
- Director of Operations: Aziz Tahir

== Former coaches ==
Name	Nat	Tenure
Bob Krohn	United States	1980–1981
Michael Kunert	Germany	1982–2000
Tim Lenahan	United States	2001–2021
