= 2024 Big Ten Conference men's soccer season =

2024 Big Ten Conference men' soccer season
- League: NCAA Division I
- Sport: Soccer
- Duration: August 22 - December 16, 2024
- Teams: 11
- TV partner(s): Fox Sports (Fox/FS2, BTN)

2025 MLS SuperDraft
- Top draft pick: Dean Boltz
- Picked by: Chicago Fire, 3rd overall

Regular season
- Champions: Indiana, Ohio State

Tournament
- Champions: Ohio State
- Runners-up: Michigan
- Finals MVP: Parker Grinstead

Men's Soccer seasons
- 2023 2025

2024 Big Ten Conference men's soccer standings
	Conf.						Overall
Team	W		L		T	PCT	W		L		T	PCT
No. 3 Ohio State ‍†‍‡‍	7	–	1	–	2	.800	16	–	2	–	4	.818
No. 11 Indiana ‍†‍‍^{y}	7	–	1	–	2	.800	11	–	5	–	5	.643
Maryland ‍‍‍^{y}	5	–	3	–	2	.600	9	–	6	–	5	.575
Washington ‍‍‍^{y}	4	–	3	–	3	.550	8	–	6	–	7	.548
Michigan State ‍‍‍	4	–	4	–	2	.500	5	–	7	–	5	.441
UCLA ‍‍‍^{y}	3	–	4	–	3	.450	7	–	6	–	6	.526
Michigan ‍‍‍^{y}	2	–	3	–	5	.450	9	–	5	–	7	.595
Northwestern ‍‍‍	3	–	6	–	1	.350	9	–	7	–	1	.559
Rutgers ‍‍‍	3	–	6	–	1	.350	6	–	9	–	2	.412
Wisconsin ‍‍‍	2	–	5	–	3	.350	7	–	5	–	3	.567
Penn State ‍‍‍	2	–	6	–	2	.300	5	–	9	–	2	.375
† – Conference champion ‡ – 2024 B1G tournament champion y – Invited to the 2024 NCAA Tournament; As of December 18, 2024; Rankings from United Soccer Coaches; Source: Big Ten

The 2024 Big Ten Conference men's soccer season was the 33rd season of college soccer play for the Big Ten Conference and part of the 2024 NCAA Division I men's soccer season. This is Big Ten's first season with UCLA and Washington as conference members.

The Maryland Terrapins were the defending champions. Ohio State were the conference champions.

== Previous season ==
Rutgers won the Big Ten men's soccer tournament for the first time in program history, and won their first conference tournament championship since 1997. Maryland won their first Big Ten Conference regular season championship since 2016. MD Myers of Rutgers won both the regular season and tournament Player of the Year award.

In the 2022 NCAA Division I men's soccer tournament, four Big Ten teams received bids into the tournament. Rutgers earned the automatic bid, while Maryland, Ohio State, and Indiana received at-large bids. Maryland and Ohio State reached the second round of the tournament before being eliminated, while Rutgers was eliminated in the first round. Indiana reached their NCAA-record 17th NCAA National Championship game, but lost in penalty kicks to Syracuse in the final.

In the 2023 MLS SuperDraft, Maryland sophomore, Joshua Bolma, was the first Big Ten player to be drafted, selected fourth overall by the New England Revolution.

== Teams ==
=== Stadiums and locations ===
Team	Location	Stadium	Capacity
Indiana	Bloomington, Indiana	Bill Armstrong Stadium	6,500
Maryland	College Park, Maryland	Ludwig Field	7,000
Michigan	Ann Arbor, Michigan	U-M Soccer Stadium	2,200
Michigan State	Lansing, Michigan	DeMartin Soccer Complex	2,500
Northwestern	Evanston, Illinois	Lanny and Sharon Martin Stadium	3,000
Ohio State	Columbus, Ohio	Jesse Owens Memorial Stadium	10,000
Penn State	State College, Pennsylvania	Jeffrey Field	5,000
Rutgers	Piscataway, New Jersey	Yurcak Field	5,000
UCLA	Los Angeles, California	Wallis Annenberg Stadium	2,145
Washington	Seattle, Washington	Husky Soccer Stadium	3,250
Wisconsin	Madison, Wisconsin	Don McClimon Stadium	2,000

== Preseason ==
=== Recruiting classes ===
Rankings
Team	Rivals	Scout & 24/7	On3 Recruits	Signees
Indiana	64	65	63	17
Maryland	32	38	44	24
Michigan	13	16	15	26
Michigan State	44	42	43	20
Northwestern	81	80	74	17
Ohio State	4	5	3	22
Penn State	17	15	16	25
Rutgers	35	35	40	26
UCLA	85	90	69	11
Washington	56	47	49	16
Wisconsin	19	23	22	22

=== Preseason poll ===
Big Ten preseason poll
Predicted finish	Team

=== Preseason national polls ===
	United; Soccer	CSN	Top Drawer; Soccer
Indiana			
Maryland			
Michigan			
Michigan State			
Northwestern			
Ohio State			
Penn State			
Rutgers			
UCLA			
Washington			
Wisconsin			

== Regular season ==
Win Draw Loss Fixtures

Away team listed first, home team listed second. Teams in bold represent Big Ten teams.

== Postseason ==
=== B1G Tournament ===
**First round** Thursday, Nov. 7
4	**Washington (pen.)**	**0 (5)**
5	Michigan State	0 (3)
2	Indiana	0
7	**Michigan**	**1**
3	Maryland	0
6	**UCLA**	**6**

**Semifinals**; Sunday, Nov. 10
1	**Ohio State**	**3**
4	Washington	1
7	**Michigan (pen.)**	**1 (4)**
6	UCLA	1 (2)

**Final**; Sunday, Nov. 17
1	**Ohio State**	1
7	Michigan	0

=== NCAA Tournament ===
Seed	Region	School	1st round	2nd round	3rd round	Quarterfinals	Semifinals	Championship
1	Ohio State	Ohio State	BYE	**W 2–1** vs. Western Michigan – (Columbus)	**T 0–0 (W 4–2 p)** vs. (16) Stanford – (Columbus)	**W 3–0** vs. (8) Wake Forest – (Columbus)	**L 0–1** vs. (13) Marshall – (Cary)	—
14	Denver	Indiana	BYE	**W 2–1** vs. Akron – (Bloomington)	**L 0–1** at (3) Denver – (Denver)	—	—	—
—N/a	Ohio State	UCLA	**L 0–1** vs. UC Santa Barbara – (Los Angeles)	—	—	—	—	—
—N/a	Ohio State	Maryland	**W 5–2** vs. LIU – (College Park)	**L 1–2** at (8) Wake Forest – (Winston-Salem)	—	—	—	—
—N/a	Georgetown	Michigan	**W 2–0** vs. Robert Morris – (Ann Arbor)	**L 0–2** at (5) Dayton – (Dayton)	—	—	—	—
—N/a	Georgetown	Washington	**T 0–0 (W 3–0 p)** vs. Seattle – (Seattle)	**L 1–2** at (12) SMU – (Dallas)	—	—	—	—
W–L–D (%):			2–1–1 (.625)	2–3–0 (.400)	0–1–1 (.250)	1–0–0 (1.000)	0–1–0 (.000)	0–0–0 (–) Total: 5–6–2 (.462)

== Rankings ==
=== National rankings ===
	Improvement in ranking
	Drop in ranking
RV	Received votes but were not ranked in Top 25
NV	No votes received

		Pre	Wk 1	Wk 2	Wk 3	Wk 4	Wk 5	Wk 6	Wk 7	Wk 8	Wk 9	Wk 10	Wk 11	Wk 12	Wk 13	Wk 14	Wk 15	Final
Indiana	USC													None released				
Indiana	TDS																	
Indiana	CSN																	
Maryland	USC													None released				
Maryland	TDS																	
Maryland	CSN																	
Michigan	USC													None released				
Michigan	TDS																	
Michigan	CSN																	
Michigan State	USC													None released				
Michigan State	TDS																	
Michigan State	CSN																	
Northwestern	USC													None released				
Northwestern	TDS																	
Northwestern	CSN																	
Ohio State	USC													None released				
Ohio State	TDS																	
Ohio State	CSN																	
Penn State	USC													None released				
Penn State	TDS																	
Penn State	CSN																	
Rutgers	USC													None released				
Rutgers	TDS																	
Rutgers	CSN																	
UCLA	USC													None released				
UCLA	TDS																	
UCLA	CSN																	
Washington	USC													None released				
Washington	TDS																	
Washington	CSN																	
Wisconsin	USC													None released				
Wisconsin	TDS																	
Wisconsin	CSN																	

=== Regional rankings - USC North Region ===
	Improvement in ranking
	Drop in ranking
RV	Received votes but were not ranked in Top 10
NV	No votes received

The United Soccer Coaches' North region ranks teams across the Big Ten, Horizon, and Ohio Valley Conferences.

	Wk 1	Wk 2	Wk 3	Wk 4	Wk 5	Wk 6	Wk 7	Wk 8	Wk 9	Wk 10	Wk 11
Indiana											
Maryland											
Michigan											
Michigan State											
Northwestern											
Ohio State											
Penn State											
Rutgers											
UCLA											
Washington											
Wisconsin											

== Awards and honors ==
=== Player of the week honors ===
Following each week's games, Big Ten conference officials select the players of the week.

Week	Offensive			Defensive			Goalkeeper	
Week	Player	Position	Team	Player	Position	Team	Player	Team
1 (Aug. 27)	Dean Boltz	FW	Wisconsin	Joey Zalinsky	DF	Rutgers	Matisse Hébert	Wisconsin
2 (Sept. 3)	Tommy Mihalic	FW	Indiana	Shakir Nixon	DF	UCLA	Sam Joseph	UCLA
3 (Sept. 10)	Noah Glorioso	MF	Wisconsin	Chris Meyers	MF	Washington	Matisse Hébert (2)	Wisconsin
4 (Sept. 17)	Max Rogers	FW	Maryland	Chris Meyers (2)	MF	Washington	Max Trejo	Ohio State
5 (Sept. 24)	Luciano Pechota	MF	Ohio State	Nick McHenry	DF	Ohio State	Jadon Bowton	Washington
6 (Oct. 1)	Jonathan Stout	MF	Michigan State	Matthew Henderson	DF	Penn State	Zac Kelly	Michigan State
7 (Oct. 8)	David Wrona	MF	Ohio State	Siggi Magnusson	DF	Ohio State	Max Trejo (2)	Ohio State
8 (Oct. 15)	Jose Contell	FW	UCLA	Jansen Miller	DF	Indiana	Wyatt Nelson	UCLA
9 (Oct. 22)	Justin Weiss	FW	Indiana	Quinton Elliot	DF	Indiana	Wyatt Nelson (2)	UCLA
10 (Oct. 29)	Michael Adedokun	MF	Ohio State	Ryan Quintos	DF	Wisconsin	JT Harms	Indiana
11 (Nov. 5)	Tommy Mihalic (2)	FW	Indiana	Alex Barger	DF	Indiana	Jadon Bowton (2)	Washington

=== Postseason honors ===
Unanimous selections in bold.

**2024 B1G Men's Soccer Individual Awards**
Award	Recipient(s)
Offensive Player of the Year	Tommy Mihalic, Indiana
Midfielder of the Year	**Michael Adedokun**, Ohio State
Defensive Player of the Year	William Kulvik, Maryland
Goalkeeper of the Year	Zac Kelly, Michigan State
Coach of the Year	**Brian Maisonneuve**, Ohio State
Freshman of the Year	Dean Boltz, Wisconsin

**2024 B1G Men's Soccer All-Conference Teams**
First Team Honorees	Second Team Honorees	All-Freshman Team Honorees	Sportsmanship Team Honorees
**Forward**; Tommy Mihalic, Indiana; Samuel Sarver, Indiana; **Midfield**; Patrick McDonald, Indiana; Leon Koehl, Maryland; **Michael Adedokun**, Ohio State; Andre Ochoa, UCLA; **Defense**; Quinton Elliot, Indiana; William Kulvik, Maryland; Siggi Magnusson, Ohio State; Deylen Vellios, Ohio State; **Goalkeeper**; Zac Kelly, Michigan State	**Forward**; Max Rogers, Maryland; Colin Griffith, Maryland; Marko Borkovic, Ohio State; Dean Boltz, Wisconsin; **Midfield**; Collin McCamy, Northwestern; Luciano Pechota, Ohio State; Curt Calov, Rutgers; Peter Kingston, Washington; **Defense**; Jansen Miller, Indiana; Bryce Blevins, Michigan; Nigel Prince, Northwestern; Nico Cavallo, UCLA; Caden Buckley, Washington; **Goalkeeper**; JT Harms, Indiana	Charlie Heuer, Indiana; **Josh Maher**, Indiana; Laurin Mack, Maryland; Kamau Brame, Michigan; Brandon Munson, Michigan State; **David Ajagbe**, Ohio State; Nick McHenry, Ohio State; Malick Daouda, Penn State; Allan Legaspi, UCLA; Zach Ramsey, Washington; **Dean Boltz**, Wisconsin; Matthew Zachemski, Wisconsin	Jack Wagoner, Indiana; Alex Nitzl, Maryland; Ethan Wood, Michigan; Jonathan Stout, Michigan State; Thaddaeus Dewing, Northwestern; Parker Grinstead, Ohio State; Ben Liscum, Penn State; Aidan Flynn, Rutgers; Andre Ochoa, UCLA; Chris Peretti, Washington; Ryan Keefe, Wisconsin

== 2025 MLS Draft ==
The 2025 MLS SuperDraft was held in December 2024. Sixteen Big Ten players were selected in the draft, all in the first three rounds.

Rnd.	Pick	Player	Pos.	Team	School
1	3	Dean Boltz	FW	Chicago Fire	Wisconsin (Fr.)
1	8	Jansen Miller	DF	Sporting Kansas City	Indiana (Sr.)
1	13	Michael Adedokun	MF	CF Montréal	Ohio State (Sr.)
1	20	Jason Bucknor	DF	LA Galaxy	Michigan (Sr.)
2	31	Harrison Bertos	DF	San Diego FC	Washington (So.)
2	34	Anthony Samways	DF	Sporting Kansas City	Ohio State (Sr.)
2	37	Joey Zalinsky	DF	St. Louis City SC	Rutgers (Sr.)
2	41	Sam Sarver	FW	FC Dallas	Indiana (Sr.)
2	50	Caden Grabfelder	FW	CF Montréal	Penn State (So.)
2	54	Collin McCamy	MF	New York City FC	Northwestern (Sr.)
2	57	Collins Oduro	FW	Orlando City SC	Indiana (So.)
3	64	Leon Koehl	MF	Sporting Kansas City	Maryland (So.)
3	71	Mohamed Cisset	DF	FC Dallas	Penn State (So.)
3	83	William Kulvik	DF	Atlanta United FC	Maryland (Sr.)
3	85	Nick Collins	DF	Minnesota United FC	Rutgers (So.)
3	88	Nicholas Cavallo	DF	New York City FC	UCLA (Sr.)
