= 2023 Big Ten men's soccer tournament =

Postseason men's soccer tournament

- Classification: Division I
- Teams: 8
- Matches: 7
- First round site: Top Seed Campus Site
- Quarterfinals site: Higher seeds
- Semifinals site: Higher seeds
- Finals site: Bill Armstrong Stadium; Bloomington, Indiana
- Champions: Indiana (16th title)
- Winning coach: Todd Yeagley (5th title)
- MVP: Samuel Sarver (Offensive) (Indiana); Kris Shakes (Defensive) (Penn State)
- Broadcast: BTN

2023 Big Ten Conference men's soccer standings
	Conf.						Overall
Team	W		L		T	PCT	W		L		T	PCT
No. 7 Indiana ‍†‍‡‍	4	–	2	–	2	.625	15	–	4	–	5	.729
Penn State ‍†‍‍	4	–	2	–	2	.625	10	–	4	–	5	.658
Michigan State ‍‍‍	3	–	1	–	4	.625	7	–	2	–	7	.656
Northwestern ‍‍‍	4	–	3	–	1	.563	10	–	4	–	3	.676
Michigan ‍‍‍	2	–	1	–	5	.563	5	–	5	–	7	.500
Wisconsin ‍‍‍	2	–	2	–	4	.500	6	–	5	–	6	.529
Ohio State ‍‍‍	3	–	4	–	1	.438	6	–	6	–	5	.500
Rutgers ‍‍‍	3	–	4	–	1	.438	5	–	8	–	3	.406
Maryland ‍‍‍	0	–	6	–	2	.125	4	–	8	–	3	.367
† – Conference champion ‡ – 2023 Big Ten tournament champion y – Invited to the 2023 NCAA Tournament; As of December 12, 2023; Rankings from United Soccer Coaches; Source: Big Ten

The 2023 Big Ten men's soccer tournament was the 33rd edition of the tournament. As the tournament champion, Indiana earned the Big Ten Conference's automatic berth into the 2023 NCAA Division I men's soccer tournament.

== Seeding ==
Seeding was determined by regular season conference record points per game.

Seed	School	Conference	Tiebreaker
1	Indiana	4–2–2	
2	Penn State	4–2–2	
3	Michigan State	3–1–4	
4	Northwestern	4–3–1	
5	Michigan	2–1–5	
6	Ohio State	3–4–1	
7	Rutgers	3–4–1	
8	Wisconsin	2–2–4	

== Bracket ==
Quarterfinals; November 3
1	Indiana	2
8	Wisconsin	1
4	Northwestern	0
5	Michigan	1
3	Michigan State	0
6	Ohio State	1
2	Penn State	3
7	Rutgers	1

Semifinals; November 8
1	Indiana	4
5	Michigan	3
6	Ohio State	1 (3)
2	Penn State (pen.)	1 (4)

Championship; November 12
1	Indiana	1
2	Penn State	0

== Results ==
=== Quarterfinals ===
November 3, 2023	#2 Penn State	3–1	#7 Rutgers	University Park, PA
6:00 p.m. EST	Mohamed Cisset 41'; Peter Mangione 53'; Van Danielson 74'	Report	(yellow card) 85' Joey Zalinsky; 87' Ola Maeland	Stadium: Jeffrey Field; Attendance: 1,146; Referee: Calin Radosav; Assistant referees: Michael Gorsegner; Saki Atsas; Fourth official: Cody Hack

November 3, 2023	#3 Michigan State	0–1	#6 Ohio State	East Lansing, MI
6:30 p.m. EST	Will Eby (yellow card) 79'	Report	(yellow card) 50' Deylen Vellios; 54' Andre Roberts	Stadium: Old College Field; Attendance: 2,015; Referee: Art Arustamyan; Assistant referees: Rob Ruta; Steve Besk; Fourth official: Derrick Mroz

November 3, 2023	#1 Indiana	2–1	#8 Wisconsin	Bloomington, IN
7:30 p.m. EST	Joey Maher 12'; Maouloune Goumballe 54'	Report	(yellow card) 72' Team; 74' Max Keenan	Stadium: Bill Armstrong Stadium; Attendance: 2,031; Referee: Sergio Gonzalez; Assistant referees: Brian Alvarez; Sean West; Fourth official: Aaron Rawlins

November 3, 2023	#4 Northwestern	0–1	#5 Michigan	Evanston, IL
7:00 p.m. CST	Tyler Glassberg (yellow card) 23'; Bryant Mayer (yellow card) 32'; Team (yellow card) 87'	Report	(yellow card) 32' Jason Bucknor; (yellow card) 42' Simon Vasquez; (yellow card) 69' (goal) 71' Alex Waggoner	Stadium: Lanny and Sharon Martin Stadium; Attendance: 521; Referee: Sorin Stoica; Assistant referees: Ali Zolgharnain; Vincent Ragone; Fourth official: Besnik Rexhepi

=== Semifinals ===
November 8, 2023	#2 Penn State	1–1 (a.e.t.) (4–3 p)	#6 Ohio State	University Park, PA
6:00 p.m. EST	Samson Kpardeh 23'	Report	2' Laurence Wootton; (yellow card) 54' Owen Sullivan; (yellow card) 84' Donny Williams; (yellow card) 101' Parker Grinstead	Stadium: Jeffrey Field; Attendance: 1,425; Referee: Dimitrios Katsimingos; Assistant referees: Saki Atsas; Zachary Richter; Fourth official: Peter Dhima
	Penalties
	Peter Mangione (penalty scored); Femi Awodesu (penalty scored); Freddie Bell (penalty missed); Matthew Henderson (penalty scored); Ben Liscum (penalty scored)		(penalty scored) Parker Grinstead; (penalty missed) Laurence Wootton; (penalty scored) Marko Borkovic; (penalty scored) Owen Sullivan; (penalty missed) Luciano Pechota

November 8, 2023	#1 Indiana	4–3	#5 Michigan	Bloomington, IN
8:00 p.m. EST	Maouloune Goumballe 20', 86'; Hugo Bacharach 35'; Tommy Mihalić 44'	Report	(yellow card) 12' (goal) 21' (red card) 74' Jason Bucknor; 53' Quin Rogers; 71' Riley Ferch	Stadium: Bill Armstrong Stadium; Attendance: 2,893; Referee: Dimitar Chavdarov; Assistant referees: Cory Richardson; Brian Alvarez; Fourth official: Aaron Rawlins

=== Championship ===
November 12, 2023	#1 Indiana	1–0	#2 Penn State	Bloomington, IN
12:00 p.m. EST	Sarver 37'; Joey Maher (yellow card) 79'	Report	(yellow card) 19' Femi Awodesu; (yellow card) 28' Alex Stevenson; (yellow card) 67' Samuel Ovesen	Stadium: Bill Armstrong Stadium; Attendance: 4,045; Referee: Heber Estrada; Assistant referees: Art Arustamyan; Eulogio Villalpando; Fourth official: Dimitrios Katsimingos

== All-Tournament team ==
Player	Team
Hugo Bacharach	Indiana
Maouloune Goumballe	Indiana
Samuel Sarver*	Indiana
Jason Bucknor	Michigan
Elijah Howe	Michigan State
Nigel Prince	Northwestern
Deylen Vellios	Ohio State
Peter Mangione	Penn State
Kris Shakes^	Penn State
Ola Maeland	Rutgers
Max Keenan	Wisconsin

* Offensive MVP
^ Defensive MVP
