= 2022 Big Ten men's soccer tournament =

Postseason men's soccer tournament

- Classification: Division I
- Teams: 8
- Matches: 7
- First round site: Top Seed Campus Site
- Quarterfinals site: Higher seeds
- Semifinals site: Higher seeds
- Finals site: Yurcak Field; Piscataway, New Jersey
- Champions: Rutgers (1st title)
- Winning coach: Jim McElderry (1st title)
- MVP: MD Myers(Offensive); Hugo Le Guennec (Defensive) (Rutgers)
- Broadcast: BTN

2022 Big Ten Conference men's soccer standings
	Conf.					Overall
Team	W		L		T	W		L		T
No. 17 Maryland+	4	–	0	–	4	11	–	4	–	5
Ohio State+	4	–	2	–	2	11	–	3	–	6
Rutgers ‡	4	–	2	–	2	10	–	5	–	6
No. 2 Indiana+	3	–	1	–	4	14	–	4	–	7
Penn State	3	–	2	–	3	6	–	6	–	4
Wisconsin	3	–	4	–	1	6	–	6	–	4
Michigan State	3	–	4	–	1	6	–	9	–	2
Northwestern	1	–	5	–	2	3	–	9	–	5
Michigan	1	–	6	–	1	4	–	10	–	3
‡ – 2022 B1G Tournament champion + – At-large invitation to the 2022 NCAA tournament; As of December 13, 2022; Rankings from United Soccer Coaches; Source: Big Ten

The 2022 Big Ten men's soccer tournament was the 32nd edition of the tournament. As the tournament champion, Rutgers earned the Big Ten Conference's automatic berth into the 2022 NCAA Division I men's soccer tournament.

== Seeding ==
Seeding was determined by regular season conference record points per game.

Seed	School	Conference	Tiebreaker
1	Maryland	4–0–4	
2	Rutgers	4–2–2	
3	Ohio State	4–2–2	
4	Indiana	3–1–4	
5	Penn State	3–2–3	
6	Michigan State	3–4–1	
7	Wisconsin	3–4–1	
8	Northwestern	1–5–2	

== Bracket ==
Quarterfinals; November 4
1	Maryland	1
8	Northwestern	0
4	Indiana	1
5	Penn State	0
3	Ohio State	1
6	Michigan State	0
2	Rutgers (pen.)	0 (5)
7	Wisconsin	0 (4)

Semifinals; November 9
1	Maryland	1
4	Indiana	2
3	Ohio State	1
2	Rutgers	2

Championship; November 13
4	Indiana	1
2	Rutgers	3

== Results ==
=== Quarterfinals ===
November 4, 2022	#1 Maryland	1–0	#8 Northwestern	College Park, MD
7:00 p.m. EST	William Kulvik (yellow card) 59'; Colin Griffith 75'	Report	(yellow card) 63' Rom Brown	Stadium: Ludwig Field; Attendance: 2,217; Referee: Sorin Stoica; Assistant referees: Ryan Slack; Vincent Ragone; Fourth official: Peter Dhima

November 4, 2022	#4 Indiana	1–0	#5 Penn State	Bloomington, IN
7:00 p.m. EST	Ryan Wittenbrink 35'; Maouloune Goumballe (yellow card) 82'	Report	(yellow card) 60' Olu Ogunwale; (yellow card) 67' Alex Stevenson; (yellow card) 67' Andrew Privett	Stadium: Bill Armstrong Stadium; Attendance: 2,187; Referee: Nicholas Balcer; Assistant referees: Justin Tatsak; Jason White; Fourth official: Sean West

November 4, 2022	#2 Rutgers	0–0 (a.e.t.) (5–4 p)	#7 Wisconsin	Piscataway, NJ
7:00 p.m. EST	Randy Arronis (yellow card) 43'; Ian Abbey (yellow card) 101'	Report	(yellow card) 40' Aron Saevarrson; (yellow card) 69' Inaki Iribarren	Stadium: Yurcak Field; Attendance: 1,202; Referee: Dimitrios Katsimingos; Assistant referees: Ernest Zielinski; Keith Fisher; Fourth official: Victor Boreges
	Penalties
	(penalty scored) Pablo Avila; (penalty scored) Thomas DeVizio; (penalty scored) MD Myers; (penalty scored) Matthew Acosta; (penalty scored) Jackson Temple		(penalty scored) Inaki Iribarren; (penalty missed) Tim Bielic; (penalty scored) Aron Saevarrson; (penalty scored) Max Keenan; (penalty scored) Ignasi Marques

November 4, 2022	#3 Ohio State	1–0	#6 Michigan State	Columbus, OH
7:00 p.m. EST	Deylen Vellios (yellow card) 80'; Devyn Etling 89'	Report		Stadium: Jesse Owens Memorial Stadium; Attendance: 2,137; Referee: Cesar Ibarra; Assistant referees: Eulogio Villalpando; Aaron Mitchell; Fourth official: Kevin Fikar

=== Semifinals ===
November 9, 2022	#2 Rutgers	2–1	#3 Ohio State	Piscataway, NJ
6:00 p.m. EST	Hugo Le Guennec (yellow card) 26'; Thomas DeVizio (yellow card) 31'; Jackson Temple 43'; Christopher Tiao 60'	Report	(yellow card) 38' Thomas Gilej; 51' Xavier Green	Stadium: Yurcak Field; Attendance: 1,581; Referee: Dimitar Chavdarov; Assistant referees: Art Arustamyan; Victor Boreges; Fourth official: Keith Fisher

November 9, 2022	#1 Maryland	1–2	#4 Indiana	College Park, MD
8:00 p.m. EST	Hunter George (yellow card) 24'; Griffin Dillon (yellow card) 48' (yellow-red card) 74'; Colin Griffith 60' (yellow card) 88'; Malcolm Johnston (yellow card) 89'	Report	34' Samuel Sarver; 39' Joey Maher	Stadium: Ludwig Field; Attendance: 2,070; Referee: Nikola Aleksic; Assistant referees: Cory Richardson; Zachary Richter; Fourth official: Brendan Orino

=== Championship ===
November 13, 2022	#2 Rutgers	2–1	#4 Indiana	Piscataway, NJ
12:00 p.m. EST	Matthew Acosta 3'; Ola Maeland 53'; Ian Abbey 84'; Thomas DeVizio (yellow card) 86'	Report	37' Patrick McDonald	Stadium: Yurcak Field; Attendance: 4,203; Referee: Sergio Gonzalez; Assistant referees: Andrew Bigelow; Jason White; Fourth official: Victor Borges

== All-Tournament team ==
Player	Team
Ryan Wittenbrink	Indiana
Nyk Sessock	Indiana
Malcolm Johnston	Maryland
Owen Finnerty	Michigan State
Jason Gajadhar	Northwestern
Xavier Green	Ohio State
Jalen Watson	Penn State
Ciaran Dalton	Rutgers
Jackson Temple	Rutgers
Christopher Tiao	Rutgers
Aron Saevarsson	Wisconsin

- Offensive MVP: MD Myers, Rutgers
- Defensive MVP: Hugo Le Guennec, Rutgers
