= 2023 Big Ten Conference men's soccer season =

2023 Big Ten Conference men' soccer season
- League: NCAA Division I
- Sport: Soccer
- Duration: August 24 – December 15, 2023
- Teams: 8
- TV partner(s): Fox Sports (Fox/FS2, BTN)

2024 MLS SuperDraft
- Top draft pick: Kimani Stewart-Baynes, 4th overall
- Picked by: Colorado Rapids

Regular season
- Champions: Indiana
- Season MVP: Peter Mangione, Penn State

Tournament
- Champions: Indiana
- Runners-up: Penn State
- Finals MVP: Offensive: Samuel Sarver; Defensive: Kris Shakes

Men's Soccer seasons
- 2022 2024

2023 Big Ten Conference men's soccer standings
	Conf.						Overall
Team	W		L		T	PCT	W		L		T	PCT
No. 7 Indiana ‍†‍‡‍	4	–	2	–	2	.625	15	–	4	–	5	.729
Penn State ‍†‍‍	4	–	2	–	2	.625	10	–	4	–	5	.658
Michigan State ‍‍‍	3	–	1	–	4	.625	7	–	2	–	7	.656
Northwestern ‍‍‍	4	–	3	–	1	.563	10	–	4	–	3	.676
Michigan ‍‍‍	2	–	1	–	5	.563	5	–	5	–	7	.500
Wisconsin ‍‍‍	2	–	2	–	4	.500	6	–	5	–	6	.529
Ohio State ‍‍‍	3	–	4	–	1	.438	6	–	6	–	5	.500
Rutgers ‍‍‍	3	–	4	–	1	.438	5	–	8	–	3	.406
Maryland ‍‍‍	0	–	6	–	2	.125	4	–	8	–	3	.367
† – Conference champion ‡ – 2023 Big Ten tournament champion y – Invited to the 2023 NCAA Tournament; As of December 12, 2023; Rankings from United Soccer Coaches; Source: Big Ten

The 2023 Big Ten Conference men's soccer season was the 32nd season of college soccer play for the Big Ten Conference and part of the 2023 NCAA Division I men's soccer season. This was the Big Ten's eleventh season with eight men's soccer teams, as in 2024, UCLA and Washington will join the conference.

The Maryland Terrapins were the defending champions, and Indiana were the regular season and tournament champions. Indiana was the only NCAA berth into the tournament, making it the first time since the conference began sponsoring men's soccer that the Big Ten did not receive an at-large berth.

Kimani Stewart-Baynes of Maryland was the first Big Ten player selected in the 2024 MLS SuperDraft, selected fourth overall by the Colorado Rapids.

== Previous season ==
Rutgers won the Big Ten men's soccer tournament for the first time in program history, and won their first conference tournament championship since 1997. Maryland won their first Big Ten Conference regular season championship since 2016. MD Myers of Rutgers won both the regular season and tournament Player of the Year award.

In the 2022 NCAA Division I men's soccer tournament, four Big Ten teams received bids into the tournament. Rutgers earned the automatic bid, while Maryland, Ohio State, and Indiana received at-large bids. Maryland and Ohio State reached the second round of the tournament before being eliminated, while Rutgers was eliminated in the first round. Indiana reached their NCAA-record 17th NCAA National Championship game, but lost in penalty kicks to Syracuse in the final.

In the 2023 MLS SuperDraft, Maryland sophomore, Joshua Bolma, was the first Big Ten player to be drafted, selected fourth overall by the New England Revolution.

== Coaching changes ==
There were no coaching changes during the 2022–23 NCAA Division I men's soccer offseason.

=== Coaches ===
Note: All stats current through the completion of the 2022 season

Team	Head coach	Previous job	Years at school	Overall record	Record at school	B1G record	Ref.
Indiana	Todd Yeagley	Wisconsin	12	143–58–43 (.674)	136–49–41 (.692)	38–16–22 (.645)	
Maryland	Sasho Cirovski	Hartford	29	423–160–65 (.703)	397–147–58 (.708)	28–9–11 (.698)	
Michigan	Chaka Daley	Providence	10	155–175–51 (.474)	65–64–24 (.503)	24–26–10 (.483)	
Michigan State	Damon Rensing	Michigan State (asst.)	13	123–75–32 (.604)	123–75–32 (.604)	34–30–14 (.526)	
Northwestern	Russell Payne	Army	3	311–218–74 (.577)	175–149–53 (.534)	39–64–21 (.399)	
Ohio State	Brian Maisonneuve	Indiana (asst.)	5	28–44–11 (.404)	28–44–11 (.404)	10–26–5 (.305)	
Penn State	Jeff Cook	Philadelphia Union II (asst.)	5	226–166–61 (.566)	46–28–12 (.605)	24–9–7 (.688)	
Rutgers	Jim McElderry	Fordham	4	157–157–49 (.500)	34–34–13 (.500)	14–22–4 (.400)	
Wisconsin	Neil Jones	Loyola	2	87–60–28 (.577)	6–6–4 (.500)	3–4–1 (.438)	

== Preseason ==
=== Preseason poll ===
The preseason poll will be released on August 21, 2023. Maryland was voted to win the conference.

Big Ten preseason poll
Predicted finish	Team
1	Maryland
2	Indiana
3	Ohio State
4	Rutgers
5	Penn State
6	Wisconsin
7	Michigan State
8	Northwestern
9	Michigan

=== Preseason national polls ===
The preseason national polls were released in July and August 2023.

	United; Soccer	CSN	Top Drawer; Soccer
Indiana	2	2	2
Maryland	14	11	17
Michigan	—	—	—
Michigan State	—	—	—
Northwestern	—	—	—
Ohio State	RV	—	—
Penn State	—	—	—
Rutgers	RV	—	—
Wisconsin	—	—	—

=== Preseason awards ===
==== All−American Teams ====
USC 1st Team	USC 2nd Team	TDS 1st Team	TDS 2nd Team	CSN 1st Team	CSN 2nd Team

==== Preseason All Big Ten ====
Big Ten Players to Watch:

- Indiana: Patrick McDonald, Collins Oduro, Samuel Sarver
- Maryland: Stefan Copetti, Alex Nitzl, Bjarne Thiesen
- Michigan: Bryce Blevins, Jason Bucknor, Louis Rogers
- Michigan State: Greyson Mercer, Jake Spadafora, Jonathan Stout
- Northwestern: Ugo Achara, Jason Gajadhar, Justin Weiss
- Ohio State: Anthony Samways, Deylen Vellios, Laurence Wootton
- Penn State: Femi Awodesu, Peter Mangione, Kris Shakes
- Rutgers: Matthew Acosta, Jason Bouregy, Joey Zalinsky
- Wisconsin: Tim Bielic, Nate Crockford, Maxwell Keenan

== Regular season ==
Win Draw Loss Fixtures

=== Week 1 (Aug. 22 – Aug. 28) ===
Date	Time (ET)	Visiting team	Home team	Site	TV	Result	Attendance
August 24	5:00 p.m.	St. Thomas (MN)	Northwestern	Lanny and Sharon Martin Stadium • Evanston, IL		W 2–1	103
August 24	7:00 p.m.	Loyola Marymount	Michigan	U-M Soccer Stadium • Ann Arbor, MI	B1G+	T 1–1	504
August 24	7:00 p.m.	Loyola Chicago	Michigan State	DeMartin Soccer Complex • East Lansing, MI	B1G+	No contest (Note: Match was abandoned in the 54th minute due to severe weather. Michigan State was leading 1–0 at the time of play stoppage. NCAA officials declared the game a no contest.)	
August 24	7:00 p.m.	CSUN	Ohio State	Jesse Owens Memorial Stadium • Columbus, OH		T 1–1	1,419
August 24	7:00 p.m.	Penn State	No. 5 Pittsburgh	Ambrose Urbanic Field • Pittsburgh, PA (rivalry)	ACCNX	T 1–1	2,000
August 24	7:00 p.m.	Rutgers	Delaware	Stuart and Grant Stadium • Newark, DE	ESPN+	L 2–3	370
August 24	8:00 p.m.	No. 2 Indiana	No. 18 Notre Dame	Alumni Stadium • Notre Dame, IN (rivalry)	ACCNX	T 1–1	2,092
August 24	8:00 p.m.	Purdue Fort Wayne	Wisconsin	McClimon Soccer Complex • Madison, WI		W 1–0	309
August 24	8:15 p.m.	No. 25 Missouri State	No. 14 Maryland	Ludwig Field • College Park, MD	B1G+	L 0–1	1,823
August 27	1:00 p.m.	Cal Baptist	Michigan	U-M Soccer Stadium • Ann Arbor, MI	B1G+	W 2–0	773
August 27	2:00 p.m.	Drake	Wisconsin	McClimon Soccer Complex • Madison, WI	B1G+	W 2–0	757
August 27	2:30 p.m.	NJIT	Northwestern	Lanny and Sharon Martin Stadium • Evanston, IL	B1G+	W 1–0	476
August 27	4:00 p.m.	Le Moyne	Penn State	Jeffrey Field • State College, PA		W 4–0	1,288
August 27	7:00 p.m.	No. 10 UNCG	No. 14 Maryland	Ludwig Field • College Park, MD	B1G+	W 2–0	2,229
August 27	7:00 p.m.	UC Davis	Ohio State	Jesse Owens Memorial Stadium • Columbus, OH		L 1–2	2,000
August 28	7:00 p.m.	Bowling Green	Michigan State	DeMartin Soccer Complex • East Lansing, MI	B1G+	W 3–0	2,098
August 28	7:30 p.m.	St. John's	Rutgers	Yurcak Field • Piscataway, NJ	B1G+	T 2–2	1,337

=== Week 2 (Aug. 29 – Sep. 4) ===
Date	Time (ET)	Visiting team	Home team	Site	TV	Result	Attendance
August 29	8:00 p.m.	DePaul	No. 10 Indiana	Bill Armstrong Stadium • Bloomington, IN	B1G+	W 2–0	2,104
September 1	4:00 p.m.	Ohio State	Seton Hall	Bill Armstrong Stadium • Bloomington, IN		L 0–1	300
September 1	6:00 p.m.	No. 1 Syracuse	No. 21 Penn State	Jeffrey Field • State College, PA	FS2	T 1–1	2,684
September 1	7:00 p.m.	No. 9 Akron	Michigan	U-M Soccer Stadium • Ann Arbor, MI	B1G+	T 1–1	1,973
September 1	7:00 p.m.	Michigan State	Army	Malek Stadium • West Point, NY	ESPN+	W 2–1	1,250
September 1	7:00 p.m.	Rutgers	Princeton	Roberts Stadium • Princeton, NJ (rivalry)	WPVI	L 1–2	1,202
September 1	7:30 p.m.	No. 18 Wake Forest	No. 20 Maryland	Ludwig Field • College Park, MD	B1G+	T 0–0	4,644
September 1	8:00 p.m.	No. 9 Washington	No. 10 Indiana	Bill Armstrong Stadium • Bloomington, IN	BTN	L 0–1	3,408
September 1	8:00 p.m.	Northwestern	Milwaukee	Engelmann Stadium • Milwaukee, WI	ESPN+	W 2–1	1,012
September 1	8:00 p.m.	No. 2 Kentucky	Wisconsin	McClimon Soccer Complex • Madison, WI	B1G+	W 1–0	827
September 4	11:00 a.m.	Michigan State	Villanova	Higgins Soccer Complex • Philadelphia, PA	BEDN	T 1–1	841
September 4	3:00 p.m.	Michigan	Bowling Green	Mickey Cochrane Stadium • Bowling Green, OH		L 1–2	2,012
September 4	3:00 p.m.	Northwestern	DePaul	Wish Field • Chicago, IL	FloSports	T 1–1	672
September 4	5:00 p.m.	St. John's	No. 21 Penn State	Jeffrey Field • State College, PA		W 2–0	1,135
September 4	7:00 p.m.	No. 20 Maryland	No. 15 Virginia	Klöckner Stadium • Charlottesville, VA (rivalry)	ACCNX	L 1–2	2,139
September 4	7:00 p.m.	No. 9 Washington	Ohio State	Jesse Owens Memorial Stadium • Columbus, OH		T 1–1	1,062
September 4	7:00 p.m.	Saint Peter's	Rutgers	Yurcak Field • Piscataway, NJ		W 2–0	743
September 4	8:00 p.m.	Seton Hall	Indiana	Bill Armstrong Stadium • Bloomington, IN	B1G+	W 1–0	2,480
September 4	8:00 p.m.	Wisconsin	UIC	Flames Field • Chicago, IL	ESPN+	L 0–2	964

=== Week 3 (Sep. 5 – Sep. 11) ===
Date	Time (ET)	Visiting team	Home team	Site	TV	Result	Attendance
September 7	7:00 p.m.	Dayton	Michigan State	DeMartin Soccer Complex • East Lansing, MI	B1G+	W 1–0	1,611
September 8	7:00 p.m.	No. 15 Indiana	South Florida	Corbett Soccer Stadium • Tampa, FL		L 0–1	1,022
September 8	7:00 p.m.	Georgetown	Maryland	Ludwig Field • College Park, MD	WMUC	Canceled (Note: Match was canceled due to inclement weather.)	
September 8	7:00 p.m.	Penn	No. 14 Penn State	Jeffrey Field • State College, PA		L 0–3	1,605
September 8	8:00 p.m.	Michigan	Creighton	Morrison Stadium • Omaha, NE	FloSports	L 1–3	4,092
September 8	8:00 p.m.	Northern Illinois	Northwestern	Lanny and Sharon Martin Stadium • Evanston, IL	B1G+	W 2–1	324
September 8	8:00 p.m.	Mercer	No. 21 Wisconsin	McClimon Soccer Complex • Madison, WI		T 0–0	553
September 9	7:00 p.m.	Ohio State	Butler	Sellick Bowl • Indianapolis, IN		W 1–0	1,081
September 9	7:00 p.m.	Rutgers	UCLA	Wallis Annenberg Stadium • Los Angeles, CA	P12NLA	L 0–4	626
September 11	8:00 p.m.	UIC	Northwestern	Lanny and Sharon Martin Stadium • Evanston, IL	B1G+	W 4–1	252
September 11	8:00 p.m.	No. 21 Wisconsin	No. 13 Marquette	Valley Fields • Milwaukee, WI	BEDN	L 1–3	610

=== Week 4 (Sep. 12 – Sep. 18) ===
Date	Time (ET)	Visiting team	Home team	Site	TV	Result	Attendance
September 12	8:00 p.m.	Michigan State	No. 10 Notre Dame	Alumni Stadium • South Bend, IN	ACCN	W 1–0	532
September 13	7:00 p.m.	Columbia	Rutgers	Yurcak Field • Piscataway, NJ	B1G+	W 2–0	437
September 14	7:00 p.m.	Michigan	Maryland	Ludwig Field • College Park, MD	B1G+	T 2–2	2,637
September 15	7:00 p.m.	Penn State	Ohio State	Jesse Owens Memorial Stadium • Columbus, OH		PSU 3–0	1,739
September 15	7:30 p.m.	Wisconsin	No. 23 Indiana	Bill Armstrong Stadium • Bloomington, IN	B1G+	T 0–0	3,053
September 15	8:00 p.m.	UC Riverside	No. 19 Northwestern	Lanny and Sharon Martin Stadium • Evanston, IL	B1G+	W 2–0	802
September 17	2:00 p.m.	Michigan State	Rutgers	Yurcak Field • Piscataway, NJ		T 1–1	633

=== Week 5 (Sep. 19 – Sep. 25) ===
Date	Time (ET)	Visiting team	Home team	Site	TV	Result	Attendance
September 19	7:00 p.m.	Maryland	Penn State	Jeffrey Field • State College, PA	BTN	PSU 1–0	951
September 19	7:00 p.m.	Michigan	Oakland	Oakland Soccer Field • Rochester Hills, MI	ESPN+	L 1–2	724
September 19	7:00 p.m.	No. 24 Kentucky	Ohio State	Jesse Owens Memorial Stadium • Columbus, OH	B1G+	W 3–0	747
September 19	7:30 p.m.	Butler	No. 25 Indiana	Bill Armstrong Stadium • Bloomington, IN	B1G+	W 1–0	2,072
September 19	8:00 p.m.	No. 12 Northwestern	Wisconsin	McClimon Soccer Complex • Madison, WI	BTN	T 2–2	482
September 22	7:00 p.m.	Rutgers	Michigan	U-M Soccer Stadium • Ann Arbor, MI		MICH 3–2	1,213
September 22	7:00 p.m.	Indiana	No. 22 Michigan State	DeMartin Soccer Complex • East Lansing, MI	B1G+	MSU 2–1	2,979
September 23	7:00 p.m.	Penn State	UNCG	UNCG Soccer Stadium • Greensboro, NC		W 2–0	342
September 24	1:00 p.m.	Maryland	Wisconsin	McClimon Soccer Complex • Madison, WI	B1G+	WIS 1–0	541
September 24	2:00 p.m.	Ohio State	No. 12 Northwestern	Lanny and Sharon Martin Stadium • Evanston, IL	BTN	NW 4–2	711

=== Week 6 (Sep. 26 – Oct. 2) ===
Date	Time (ET)	Visiting team	Home team	Site	TV	Result	Attendance
September 26	7:00 p.m.	Oakland	No. 13 Michigan State	DeMartin Soccer Complex • East Lansing, MI	B1G+	T 2–2	2,122
September 26	7:30 p.m.	Michigan	Indiana	Bill Armstrong Stadium • Bloomington, IN	FS2	T 0–0	2,066
September 27	7:00 p.m.	Howard	No. 25 Penn State	Jeffrey Field • State College, PA		W 3–1	630
September 29	7:00 p.m.	No. 16 Northwestern	Maryland	Ludwig Field • College Park, MD	B1G+	NW 2–0	3,473
September 29	7:00 p.m.	Ohio State	Rutgers	Yurcak Field • Piscataway, NJ		OSU 2–0	137
October 1	3:00 p.m.	Wisconsin	Michigan	U-M Soccer Stadium • Ann Arbor, MI	BTN	T 1–1	1,083
October 1	3:00 p.m.	No. 25 Penn State	No. 13 Michigan State	DeMartin Soccer Complex • East Lansing, MI	B1G+	T 0–0	3,274

=== Week 7 (Oct. 3 – Oct. 9) ===
Date	Time (ET)	Visiting team	Home team	Site	TV	Result	Attendance
October 3	7:00 p.m.	Indiana	Kentucky	Bell Soccer Complex • Lexington, KY (rivalry)			
October 3	7:00 p.m.	Rutgers	Maryland	Ludwig Field • College Park, MD			
October 3	7:00 p.m.	Xavier	Ohio State	Jesse Owens Memorial Stadium • Columbus, OH			
October 3	8:00 p.m.	Green Bay	Northwestern	Lanny and Sharon Martin Stadium • Evanston, IL	B1G+		
October 6	7:00 p.m.	Michigan	Ohio State	Jesse Owens Memorial Stadium • Columbus, OH (rivalry)			
October 6	8:00 p.m.	Michigan State	Wisconsin	McClimon Soccer Complex • Madison, WI			
October 7	12:00 p.m.	Indiana	Penn State	Jeffrey Field • State College, PA			
October 7	7:00 p.m.	Bowling Green	Maryland	Ludwig Field • College Park, MD			
October 8	2:00 p.m.	Rutgers	Northwestern	Lanny and Sharon Martin Stadium • Evanston, IL	B1G+		
October 9	7:00 p.m.	Bradley	Wisconsin	McClimon Soccer Complex • Madison, WI			

=== Week 8 (Oct. 10 – Oct. 16) ===
Date	Time (ET)	Visiting team	Home team	Site	TV	Result	Attendance
October 10	7:00 p.m.	Villanova	Maryland	Ludwig Field • College Park, MD			
October 10	7:00 p.m.	Michigan State	Michigan	U-M Soccer Stadium • Ann Arbor, MI (rivalry)			
October 10	7:00 p.m.	Ohio State	Louisville	Lynn Stadium • Louisville, KY			
October 11	7:00 p.m.	Evansville	Indiana	Bill Armstrong Stadium • Bloomington, IN			
October 13	6:00 p.m.	Northwestern	Penn State	Jeffrey Field • State College, PA	B1G+		
October 13	7:00 p.m.	Wisconsin	Rutgers	Yurcak Field • Piscataway, NJ			
October 15	12:00 p.m.	Ohio State	Indiana	Bill Armstrong Stadium • Bloomington, IN			
October 15	2:00 p.m.	Maryland	Michigan State	DeMartin Soccer Complex • East Lansing, MI			

=== Week 9 (Oct. 17 – Oct. 23) ===
Date	Time (ET)	Visiting team	Home team	Site	TV	Result	Attendance
October 17	6:00 p.m.	Penn State	Rutgers	Yurcak Field • Piscataway, NJ			
October 17	7:00 p.m.	Notre Dame	Michigan	U-M Soccer Stadium • Ann Arbor, MI			
October 20	7:00 p.m.	Indiana	Maryland	Ludwig Field • College Park, MD			
October 20	7:00 p.m.	Ohio State	Wisconsin	McClimon Soccer Complex • Madison, WI			
October 20	8:00 p.m.	Michigan State	Northwestern	Lanny and Sharon Martin Stadium • Evanston, IL	B1G+		
October 21	1:00 p.m.	Rutgers	Northeastern	Parsons Field • Brookline, MA			
October 22	TBA	Michigan	Penn State	Jeffrey Field • State College, PA			

=== Week 10 (Oct. 24 – Oct. 30) ===
Date	Time (ET)	Visiting team	Home team	Site	TV	Result	Attendance
October 24	6:00 p.m.	Ohio State	Michigan State	DeMartin Soccer Complex • East Lansing, MI			
October 24	7:00 p.m.	Navy	Maryland	Ludwig Field • College Park, MD (rivalry)			
October 24	8:00 p.m.	Indiana	Northwestern	Lanny and Sharon Martin Stadium • Evanston, IL	BTN		
October 24	8:00 p.m.	Milwaukee	Wisconsin	McClimon Soccer Complex • Madison, WI			
October 25	6:00 p.m.	Detroit Mercy	Penn State	Jeffrey Field • State College, PA			
October 25	7:00 p.m.	Cleveland State	Michigan	U-M Soccer Stadium • Ann Arbor, MI			
October 27	6:30 p.m.	Trine	Indiana	Bill Armstrong Stadium • Bloomington, IN			
October 27	7:00 p.m.	Drake	Michigan State	DeMartin Soccer Complex • East Lansing, MI			
October 29	1:00 p.m.	Rutgers	Indiana	Bill Armstrong Stadium • Bloomington, IN			
October 29	1:00 p.m.	Maryland	Ohio State	Jesse Owens Memorial Stadium • Columbus, OH			
October 29	1:00 p.m.	Northwestern	Michigan	U-M Soccer Stadium • Ann Arbor, MI	B1G+		
October 29	1:00 p.m.	Penn State	Wisconsin	McClimon Soccer Complex • Madison, WI			

== Postseason ==
=== Big Ten Tournament ===
The Big Ten Tournament was played from November 3–12. Indiana won the Big Ten tournament title over Penn State.

Quarterfinals; November 3
1	Indiana	2
8	Wisconsin	1
4	Northwestern	0
5	Michigan	1
3	Michigan State	0
6	Ohio State	1
2	Penn State	3
7	Rutgers	1

Semifinals; November 8
1	Indiana	4
5	Michigan	3
6	Ohio State	1 (3)
2	Penn State (p)	1 (4)

Championship; November 12
1	Indiana	1
2	Penn State	0

==== All-Tournament team ====
Player	Team
Hugo Bacharach	Indiana
Maouloune Goumballe	Indiana
Samuel Sarver (Note: Offensive MVP)	Indiana
Jason Bucknor	Michigan
Elijah Howe	Michigan State
Nigel Prince	Northwestern
Deylen Vellios	Ohio State
Peter Mangione	Penn State
Kris Shakes (Note: Defensive MVP)	Penn State
Ola Maeland	Rutgers
Max Keenan	Wisconsin

=== NCAA Tournament ===
The NCAA Tournament began on November 15, 2023 and conclude on December 11, 2023. For the first time in Big Ten history, only one team made the NCAA tournament.

Seed	Region	School	1st Round	2nd Round	3rd Round	Quarterfinals	Semifinals	Championship
—N/a	4	Indiana	W 2–1 vs. Lipscomb – (Bloomington)	W 3–2 at (10) Wake Forest – (Winston-Salem)	W 1–0 at (7) Virginia – (Charlottesville)	T 1–1 (L 4–5 p) at (7) Virginia – (Charlottesville)	—	—
W–L–T (%):			1–0–0 (1.000)	1–0–0 (1.000)	1–0–0 (1.000)	0–0–1 (.500)	0–0–0 (–)	0–0–0 (–) Total: 3–0–1 (.875)

== Rankings ==
=== National rankings ===
	Improvement in ranking
	Drop in ranking
RV	Received votes but were not ranked in Top 25
NV	No votes received

		Pre	Wk 1	Wk 2	Wk 3	Wk 4	Wk 5	Wk 6	Wk 7	Wk 8	Wk 9	Wk 10	Wk 11	Wk 12	Wk 13	Wk 14	Wk 15	Final
Indiana	USC	2	10	15	23	NV	NV	NV	NV	NV	NV	NV	RV	None released				
Indiana	TDS	2	3	7	21	NV	NV	NV	NV	NV	NV	NV	NV	16				
Indiana	CSN	2	3	13	25	25	RV	NV	NV	NV	NV	NV	25	10				
Maryland	USC	14	20	NV	NV	NV	NV	NV	NV	NV	NV	NV	NV	None released				
Maryland	TDS	11	11	12	NV	NV	NV	NV	NV	NV	NV	NV	NV	NV				
Maryland	CSN	17	19	22	RV	NV	NV	NV	NV	NV	NV	NV	NV	NV				
Michigan	USC	NV	NV	NV	NV	NV	NV	NV	NV	NV	NV	NV	NV	None released				
Michigan	TDS	NV	NV	NV	NV	NV	NV	NV	NV	NV	NV	NV	NV	NV				
Michigan	CSN	NV	NV	NV	NV	NV	NV	NV	NV	NV	NV	NV	NV	NV				
Michigan State	USC	NV	NV	NV	NV	22	13	23	19	20	16	NV	NV	None released				
Michigan State	TDS	NV	NV	NV	NV	18	12	22	23	NV	NV	NV	NV	NV				
Michigan State	CSN	NV	NV	NV	NV	NV	14	14	11	9	8	20	RV	NV				
Northwestern	USC	NV	NV	NV	19	13	16	12	12	21	RV	NV	NV	None released				
Northwestern	TDS	NV	NV	NV	NV	20	23	17	18	23	NV	NV	NV	NV				
Northwestern	CSN	NV	NV	RV	30	20	16	10	10	12	22	27	RV	NV				
Ohio State	USC	RV	NV	NV	NV	NV	NV	NV	NV	NV	NV	NV	NV	None released				
Ohio State	TDS	NV	NV	NV	NV	NV	NV	NV	NV	NV	NV	NV	NV	NV				
Ohio State	CSN	NV	NV	NV	NV	NV	NV	NV	NV	NV	NV	NV	NV	NV				
Penn State	USC	NV	21	14	RV	RV	25	19	NV	NV	NV	NV	NV	None released				
Penn State	TDS	NV	NV	23	NV	NV	NV	NV	NV	NV	NV	NV	NV	NV				
Penn State	CSN	NV	NV	27	NV	22	22	21	22	19	27	26	24	27				
Rutgers	USC	RV	NV	NV	NV	NV	NV	NV	NV	NV	NV	NV	NV	None released				
Rutgers	TDS	NV	NV	NV	NV	NV	NV	NV	NV	NV	NV	NV	NV	NV				
Rutgers	CSN	NV	NV	NV	NV	NV	NV	NV	NV	NV	NV	NV	NV	NV				
Wisconsin	USC	NV	NV	21	NV	NV	NV	NV	NV	NV	NV	NV	NV	None released				
Wisconsin	TDS	NV	NV	15	NV	NV	NV	NV	NV	NV	NV	NV	NV	NV				
Wisconsin	CSN	NV	NV	15	RV	RV	RV	NV	NV	NV	NV	NV	NV	NV				

=== Regional rankings - USC North Region ===
	Improvement in ranking
	Drop in ranking
RV	Received votes but were not ranked in Top 10
NV	No votes received

The United Soccer Coaches' North region ranks teams across the Big Ten, Horizon, and Ohio Valley Conferences.

	Wk 1	Wk 2	Wk 3	Wk 4	Wk 5	Wk 6	Wk 7	Wk 8	Wk 9	Wk 10	Wk 11
Indiana	1	5	7	6	6	7	6	5	3	3	2
Maryland	4	2	4	9	NV	NV	NV	NV	NV	NV	NV
Michigan	7	8	10	10	9	NV	NV	NV	NV	NV	NV
Michigan State	NV	6	1	1	1	4	2	4	1	1	4
Northwestern	5	7	2	2	2	1	1	1	5	5	5
Ohio State	NV	NV	NV	NV	NV	NV	NV	NV	NV	NV	NV
Penn State	2	3	5	3	3	3	4	2	4	4	3
Rutgers	NV	NV	NV	8	NV	NV	NV	NV	NV	NV	NV
Wisconsin	3	1	6	4	4	6	5	7	6	6	6

== Awards and honors ==
=== Player of the week honors ===
Following each week's games, Big Ten conference officials select the players of the week.

Week	Offensive			Defensive		
Week	Player	Position	Team	Player	Position	Team
Week 1 (Aug. 29)	Maxwell Keenan	MF	WIS	Kris Shakes	GK	PSU
Week 2 (Sep. 5)	Alex Stevenson	MF	PSU	Kris Shakes (2)	GK	PSU
Week 3 (Sep. 12)	Justin Weiss	FW	NW	Zac Kelly	GK	MSU
Week 4 (Sep. 19)	Liam Butts	FW	PSU	Zac Kelly (2)	GK	MSU

=== Postseason honors ===
Unanimous selections in bold.

**2023 B1G Men's Soccer Individual Awards**
Award	Recipient(s)
Offensive Player of the Year	Peter Mangione, Penn State
Midfielder of the Year	Laurence Wootton, Ohio State
Defensive Player of the Year	Femi Awodesu, Penn State
Goalkeeper of the Year	Kris Shakes, Penn State
Coach of the Year	Jeff Cook, Penn State
Freshman of the Year	Kimani Stewart-Baynes, Maryland

**2023 B1G Men's Soccer All-Conference Teams**
First Team Honorees	Second Team Honorees	All-Freshman Team Honorees	Sportsmanship Team Honorees
Joey Maher, D, Indiana; Patrick McDonald, M, Indiana; Samuel Sarver, F, Indiana; Jonathan Stout, M, Michigan State; Collin McCamy, M, Northwestern; Nigel Prince, D, Northwestern; Justin Weiss, F, Northwestern; **Laurence Wooton**, M, Ohio State; **Femi Awodesu**, D, Penn State; Peter Mangione, F, Penn State; Kris Shakes, GK, Penn State; Jackson Temple, F, Rutgers	Hugo Bacharach, M, Indiana; JT Harms, GK, Indiana; William Kulvik, D, Maryland; Bryce Blevins, M, Michigan; Nolan Miller, D, Michigan; Jeremy Sharp, D, Michigan State; Jake Spadafora, F, Michigan State; Ugo Achara Jr., F, Northwestern; Michael Adedokun, M, Ohio State; Siggi Magnusson, D, Ohio State; Luciano Pechota, M, Ohio State; Matthew Acosta, M, Rutgers; Birgir Baldvinsson, D, Wisconsin; Tim Bielic, M, Wisconsin	**Collins Oduro**, Indiana; **Kimani Stewart-Baynes**, Maryland; Matthew Fisher, Michigan; Isaiah Goldson, Michigan; **Will Eby**, Michigan State; **Fritz Volmar**, Northwestern; **Andre Roberts**, Ohio State; **Caden Grabfelder**, Penn State; Nick Collins, Rutgers; Trip Fleming, Wisconsin; Ryan Quintos, Wisconsin	Maouloune Goumballe, RS-Sr., Indiana; Kento Abe, Sr., Maryland; Bode Saul, Sr., Michigan; Jack Zugay, Sr., Michigan State; Jackson Weyman, Gr., Northwestern; Luciano Pechota, So., Ohio State; Samuel Ovesen, So., Penn State; Cole Cruthers, So., Rutgers; Tim Bielec, Sr., Wisconsin

== MLS SuperDraft ==
=== Total picks by school ===
Team	Round 1	Round 2	Round 3	Total
Indiana	1	1	1	3
Maryland	1	–	–	1
Michigan	–	–	–	–
Michigan State	–	–	–	–
Northwestern	–	–	–	–
Ohio State	–	–	1	1
Penn State	–	–	–	–
Rutgers	–	–	–	–
Wisconsin	–	–	1	1
Total	2	1	3	6

=== List of selections ===
Round	Pick #	MLS team	Player	Position	College
1	4	Colorado Rapids	(Canada) Kimani Stewart-Baynes	FW	Maryland
1	9	Minnesota United FC	(Spain) Hugo Bacharach	DF	Indiana
2	30	Toronto FC	(United States) Joey Maher	DF	Indiana
3	59	Toronto FC	(United States) Patrick McDonald	MF	Indiana
3	64	Chicago Fire FC	(England) Laurence Wootton	MF	Ohio State
3	65	D.C. United	(United States) Nathan Crockford	GK	Wisconsin

== See also ==
- 2023 Big Ten Conference women's soccer season
