= 2022 Indiana Hoosiers men's soccer team =

American college soccer season

2022 Indiana Hoosiers men's soccer

NCAA tournament, Runners-up
- Conference: Big Ten Conference
- U. Soc. Coaches poll: No. 2
- TopDrawerSoccer.com: No. 2
- Record: 14–4–7 (3–1–4 Big Ten)
- Head coach: Todd Yeagley (13th season)
- Assistant coaches: Kevin Robson (7th season); Christian Lomeli (3rd season); Tanner Thompson (1st season)
- Home stadium: Bill Armstrong Stadium

2022 Big Ten Conference men's soccer standings
	Conf.					Overall
Team	W		L		T	W		L		T
No. 17 Maryland+	4	–	0	–	4	11	–	4	–	5
Ohio State+	4	–	2	–	2	11	–	3	–	6
Rutgers ‡	4	–	2	–	2	10	–	5	–	6
No. 2 Indiana+	3	–	1	–	4	14	–	4	–	7
Penn State	3	–	2	–	3	6	–	6	–	4
Wisconsin	3	–	4	–	1	6	–	6	–	4
Michigan State	3	–	4	–	1	6	–	9	–	2
Northwestern	1	–	5	–	2	3	–	9	–	5
Michigan	1	–	6	–	1	4	–	10	–	3
‡ – 2022 B1G Tournament champion + – At-large invitation to the 2022 NCAA tournament; As of December 13, 2022; Rankings from United Soccer Coaches; Source: Big Ten

The 2022 Indiana Hoosiers men's soccer team represented Indiana University Bloomington in men's college soccer during the 2022 NCAA Division I men's soccer season and 2022 Big Ten Conference men's soccer season. It was the 50th season the university fielded a men's varsity soccer program, and the 32nd season the program played in the Big Ten Conference. Indiana played their home games at Bill Armstrong Stadium and were coached by 13th-year head coach, Todd Yeagley.

== Team ==
=== Roster ===
As of December 12, 2022

Note: Flags indicate national team as defined under FIFA eligibility rules; some limited exceptions apply. Players may hold more than one non-FIFA nationality.

No.	Pos.	Nation	Player
0	GK	(United States) USA	JT Harms
1	GK	(United States) USA	Bryant Pratt
2	DF	(United States) USA	Joey Maher
3	DF	(Denmark) DEN	Lawson Redmon
4	DF	(United States) USA	Sam Bennett
5	DF	(United States) USA	Daniel Munie
6	DF	(United States) USA	Jansen Miller
7	FW	(United States) USA	Karsen Henderlong
8	MF	(United States) USA	Seth Stewart
9	FW	(United States) USA	Samuel Sarver
10	FW	(United States) USA	Tommy Mihalic
11	DF	(United States) USA	Nyk Sessock
12	MF	(United States) USA	Quentin Helmer
13	MF	(United States) USA	Emerson Nieto
14	FW	(United States) USA	Maouloune Goumballe
15	FW	(United States) USA	Luka Bezerra

No.	Pos.	Nation	Player
16	DF	(United States) USA	Lukas Hummel
17	FW	(United States) USA	Herbert Endeley
18	FW	(United States) USA	Ryan Winttenbrink
19	DF	(United States) USA	Brett Bebej
20	MF	(United States) USA	Ben Yeagley
21	MF	(United States) USA	Jack Wagoner
22	MF	(United States) USA	Patrick McDonald
23	MF	(United States) USA	Noah Joseph
24	DF	(United States) USA	Andrew Goldsworthy
25	MF	(Greece) GRE	Trey Kapsalis
26	FW	(United States) USA	Nate Ward
27	MF	(United States) USA	Alex McGill
28	MF	(United States) USA	Grant Yeagley
29	MF	(United States) USA	Luke Boha
30	GK	(United States) USA	Cooper Johnsen
32	GK	(United States) USA	Austin Himebaugh
36	MF	(United States) USA	Breckin Minzey

=== Coaching staff ===
Position	Name
Head coach	(United States) Todd Yeagley
Associate head coach	(United States) Kevin Robson
Assistant Coach	(United States) Tanner Thompson
Assistant Coach	(United States) Christian Lomeli

== Schedule ==
Date Time, TV	Rank^{#}	Opponent^{#}	Result	Record	Team events	Opponent events	Site (Attendance) City, State
Preseason
August 12*; 6:00 pm	No. 13	DePaul					IU Soccer Practice Field; Bloomington, IN
August 16*; 7:30 pm	No. 13	vs. No. 25 Bowling Green					Grand Park; Indianapolis, IN
Regular season
August 26*; 7:00 pm, ESPNU	No. 13	at No. 1 Clemson	L 2–3	0–1–0	Yeagley (yellow card) 1'; Sarver 6'; Wittenbrink 52' (yellow card) 69'; Maher (yellow card) 69'	Sylla 12', 80'; Seye 16'; Waleffe (yellow card) 18'	Riggs Field (6,539); Clemson, SC
August 30*; 7:00 pm, BTN+	No. 21	Portland	T 3–3	0–1–1	Yeagley 6'; Mihalic 13'; Wittenbrink 28'; Redmon (yellow card) 28'	Cambridge 8'; Fernandez (yellow card) 25'; Babalai 32' (yellow card) 74'; Olmos (yellow card) 53'; Hernandez (yellow card) 57'; Nava 57' (yellow card) 70'; Tracey (yellow card) 73'	Bill Armstrong Stadium (1,670); Bloomington, IN
September 6*; 8:00 pm, BTN+		St. John's adidas/IU Credit Union Classic semifinal	W 1–0	1–1–1	Mihalic 49'; Wagoner (yellow card) 63'; Maher (yellow card) 84'	Pusztahegyi (yellow card) 15'; Roseth (yellow card) 71'	Bill Armstrong Stadium (1,839); Bloomington, IN
September 9*; 8:00 pm, BTN+		No. 9 Akron adidas/IU Credit Union Classic final	W 2–0	2–1–1	Sarver 12'; Ward 39' (yellow card) 77'; Goumballe (yellow card) 60'; Yeagley (yellow card) 71'	Shokalook (yellow card) 59'; Kamdem (yellow card) 59'; Paulus (yellow card) 88'	Bill Armstrong Stadium (3,348); Bloomington, IN
September 14*; 7:00 pm, FloSports	No. 15	at No. 20 Butler	W 2–1	3–1–1	Sessock (yellow card) 2'; Miller 53' (yellow card) 61'; Wittenbrink 59'; Redmon (yellow card) 77'	Cabrera, Jr. 46'; Streberger (yellow card) 50'; Haywood (yellow card) 59'	Sellick Bowl (4,073); Indianapolis, IN
September 18; 2:00 pm, BTN+	No. 15	at No. 22 Ohio State	L 1–2	3–2–1 (0–1–0)	Endeley 72'	Green 20'; Pechota 44'; Vellios (yellow card) 85'	Owens Memorial Stadium (1,518); Columbus, OH
September 23; 7:30 pm, BTN+	No. 16	Michigan State; Rivalry	T 1–1	3–2–2 (0–1–1)	Bebej 40'; Redmon (yellow card) 78'; Sessock (yellow card) 90'	Howe (yellow card) 44'; Mercer 72'; Sala (red card) 90'	Bill Armstrong Stadium (2,108); Bloomington, IN
September 27; 8:00 pm, BTN+		Northwestern	W 4–1	4–2–2 (1–1–1)	Helmer 49'; Endeley 50'; Henderlong 52'; Wittenbrink 77'	Weiss 48'	Bill Armstrong Stadium (2,061); Bloomington, IN
October 2; 4:00 pm, BTN		at Michigan	T 2–2	4–2–3 (1–1–2)	Sessock (yellow card) 41'; McDonald (yellow card) 52'; Bebej (yellow card) 53'; Mihalic 65'; Helmer (yellow card) 73'; Munie 82'; Wagoner (yellow card) 83'; Maher (yellow card) 90'	Bucknor 20' (yellow card) 41'; Kaloukian (yellow card) 48'; Martin 66'; Evans (yellow card) 80'	U-M Soccer Stadium (1,235); Ann Arbor, MI
October 5*; 7:00 pm, BTN+		Notre Dame; Rivalry	W 1–0	5–2–3	Wittenbrink 25'	Ramsey (yellow card) 31'; Burns (yellow card) 72'	Bill Armstrong Stadium (2,311); Bloomington, IN
October 9; 12:00 pm		at Rutgers	T 2–2	5–2–4 (1–1–3)	Mihalic 3'; Munie 15'; Redmon (yellow card) 82'	Myers 8'; Avila 29'; Tiao (yellow card) 78'; Acosta (yellow card) 80'; Le Guennec (yellow card) 90'	Yurcak Field (1,131); Piscataway, NJ
October 14; 6:30 pm, BTN		Penn State	W 4–2	6–2–4 (2–1–3)	Maher 5'; Bebej 20'; Wittenbrink 48'; Wagoner (yellow card) 58' (red card) 84'; Sarver (yellow card) 60'; Endeley 64'	Butts 18'; Shakes (yellow card) 48'; Liscum (yellow card) 54'; Mangione 72'	Bill Armstrong Stadium (2,123); Bloomington, IN
October 18; 8:00 pm, BTN		at Wisconsin	W 2–1	7–2–4 (3–1–3)	Mihalic 8'; Helmer 54'; Bebej (yellow card) 54'	Popkewitz (yellow card) 44'; Keefe 49'; Dryden (yellow card) 83'	Dan McClimon Field (438); Madison, WI
October 22*; 7:00 pm, BTN+		No. 2 Kentucky	L 0–3	7–3–4		Bjorgolfsson 28'; Rodrigues (yellow card) 56'; Gutmann 64'; Soereide (yellow card) 64'; Grening 67'	Bill Armstrong Stadium (3,081); Bloomington, IN
October 25*; 7:00 pm		at Evansville	T 1–1	7–3–5	Mihalic 3'	Arntsen (yellow card) 45'; Barcia (yellow card) 49'; Graham 54'; Varela (yellow card) 90'	Arad McCutchan Stadium (1,033); Evansville, IN
October 27*; 6:30 pm, BTN+		Trine	W 3–0	8–3–5	Bezerra 21'; McGill 32'; Henderlong 48'	Cote (yellow card) 24'; Antar (yellow card) 80'	Bill Armstrong Stadium (1,139); Bloomington, IN
October 30; 1:00 pm, BTN		No. 8 Maryland	T 1–1	8–3–6 (3–1–4)	Wittenbrink 25'; Wagoner (yellow card) 74'	Suchecki (yellow card) 25'; Copetti 87'	Bill Armstrong Stadium (1,536); Bloomington, IN
Big Ten Tournament
November 4; 7:00 pm, BTN+	(4)	(5) Penn State	W 1–0	9–3–6	Wittenbrink 36'; Goumballe (yellow card) 83'	Ogunwale (yellow card) 61'; Stevenson (yellow card) 68'; Privett (yellow card) 68'	Bill Armstrong Stadium (2,187); Bloomington, IN
November 9; 8:00 pm, BTN	(4)	at (1) No. 6 Maryland	W 2–1	10–3–6	Sarver 35'; Maher 40'	George (yellow card) 25'; Dillon (yellow card) 49' (red card) 75'; Griffith 61' (yellow card) 89'; Johnston (yellow card) 90'	Ludwig Field (2,070); College Park, MD
November 13; 12:00 pm, BTN	(4)	at (2) Rutgers	L 1–3	10–4–6	McDonald 38'	Acosta 4'; Maeland 54'; Abbey 85'; DeVizio (yellow card) 87'	Yurcak Field (4,203); Piscataway, NJ
NCAA Tournament
November 20*; 12:00 pm, ESPN+	(13)	No. 21 Saint Louis	W 1–0	11–4–6	Bebej (yellow card) 59'; Wittenbrink 75'		Bill Armstrong Stadium (1,171); Bloomington, IN
November 27*; 6:30 pm, ESPN+	(13)	No. 9 Marshall	W 1–0	12–4–6	Endeley (yellow card) 16'; Bebej 47'; Goumballe (yellow card) 68'	Duggan (yellow card) 26'; Seidu (yellow card) 73'; Mocyunas (yellow card) 76'	Bill Armstrong Stadium (2,161); Bloomington, IN
December 3*; 5:00 pm, ESPN+	(13)	at (12) No. 7 UNC Greensboro	W 2–0	13–4–6	Goumballe 16'; Sarver 64' (yellow card) 64'; Wagoner (yellow card) 67'	Hagan (yellow card) 27'; Birch (yellow card) 90'	UNCG Soccer Stadium (3,622); Greensboro, NC
December 9*; 8:30 pm, ESPNU	(13)	vs. Pittsburgh; College Cup semifinal	W 2–0	14–4–6	Wittenbrink 14'; Mihalic 45'; Yeagley (yellow card) 55'	Walti (yellow card) 21'	WakeMed Soccer Park (10,286); Cary, NC
December 12*; 6:00 pm, ESPNU	(13)	vs. (3) No. 1 Syracuse; College Cup final	T 2–2 (L 6–7 P) ^{2OT}	14–4–7	McDonald 32'; Endeley 80'; Wagoner (yellow card) 90'; Maher (yellow card) 97'; Wittenbrink (penalty scored); Henderlong (penalty missed); Mihalic (penalty scored); Sarver (penalty scored); Maher (penalty scored); Bezerra (penalty scored); Helmer (penalty scored); Goumballe (penalty missed)	Salim (yellow card) 17'; Opoku 24'; Calov 33'; Sinclair (yellow card) 35'; Boselli (penalty scored); Kocevski (penalty missed); Calov (penalty scored); Singelmann (penalty scored); Biros (penalty scored); Rauch (penalty scored); Johnson (penalty scored); Sinclair (penalty scored)	WakeMed Soccer Park (4,010); Cary, NC
*Non-conference game. ^{#}Rankings from United Soccer Coaches. (#) Tournament seedings in parentheses. All times are in Eastern Time.
