= 2024 Big Ten men's soccer tournament =

Postseason men's soccer tournament

- Classification: Division I
- Teams: 7
- Matches: 6
- Attendance: 9,337
- Site: SeatGeek Stadium; Bridgeview, Illinois
- Champions: Ohio State (4th title)
- Winning coach: Brian Maisonneuve (1st title)
- MVP: Parker Grinstead (Ohio State)
- Broadcast: Big Ten Network

2024 Big Ten Conference men's soccer standings
	Conf.						Overall
Team	W		L		T	PCT	W		L		T	PCT
No. 3 Ohio State ‍†‍‡‍	7	–	1	–	2	.800	16	–	2	–	4	.818
No. 11 Indiana ‍†‍‍^{y}	7	–	1	–	2	.800	11	–	5	–	5	.643
Maryland ‍‍‍^{y}	5	–	3	–	2	.600	9	–	6	–	5	.575
Washington ‍‍‍^{y}	4	–	3	–	3	.550	8	–	6	–	7	.548
Michigan State ‍‍‍	4	–	4	–	2	.500	5	–	7	–	5	.441
UCLA ‍‍‍^{y}	3	–	4	–	3	.450	7	–	6	–	6	.526
Michigan ‍‍‍^{y}	2	–	3	–	5	.450	9	–	5	–	7	.595
Northwestern ‍‍‍	3	–	6	–	1	.350	9	–	7	–	1	.559
Rutgers ‍‍‍	3	–	6	–	1	.350	6	–	9	–	2	.412
Wisconsin ‍‍‍	2	–	5	–	3	.350	7	–	5	–	3	.567
Penn State ‍‍‍	2	–	6	–	2	.300	5	–	9	–	2	.375
† – Conference champion ‡ – 2024 B1G tournament champion y – Invited to the 2024 NCAA Tournament; As of December 18, 2024; Rankings from United Soccer Coaches; Source: Big Ten

The 2024 Big Ten Conference men's soccer tournament was the post-season men's soccer tournament for the Big Ten Conference held from November 7 to 17, 2024. The six-match tournament took place at SeatGeek Stadium in Bridgeview, Illinois. The seven-team single-elimination tournament consisted of three rounds based on seeding from regular season conference play. The defending champions were the Indiana Hoosiers. They were unable to defend their title, despite being the second seed in the tournament. They lost in the First Round to seventh seed Michigan. First seed Ohio State finished as tournament champions after defeating Michigan 1–0 in the Final. This was the fourth Big Ten title in program history for Ohio State, and first for head coach Brian Maisonneuve. As tournament champions, Ohio State earned the Big Ten's automatic place in the 2024 NCAA Division I men's soccer tournament.

== Seeding ==
The top seven teams in the regular season earned a spot in the 2024 tournament. Teams were seeded based on regular season conference record and tiebreakers were used to determine seedings of teams that finished with the same record. A tiebreaker was needed to determine the first seed, and which team would get a bye into the Semifinals as Indiana and Ohio State both finished with 7–1–2 regular season records. The two teams tied their September 27 regular season match-up 2–2. A second tiebreaker was used, which was goals scored in conference play. Ohio State won this tiebreaker and earned the first seed. Ohio State scored 28 goals in conference play, while Indiana scored 26.

Seed	School	Conference record	Points
1	Ohio State	7–1–2	23
2	Indiana	7–1–2	23
3	Maryland	5–3–2	17
4	Washington	4–3–3	15
5	Michigan State	4–4–2	14
6	UCLA	3–4–3	12
7	Michigan	2–3–5	11

== Bracket ==
First round Thursday, Nov. 7
4	Washington (pen.)	0 (5)
5	Michigan State	0 (3)
2	Indiana	0
7	Michigan	1
3	Maryland	0
6	UCLA	6

Semifinals; Sunday, Nov. 10
1	Ohio State	3
4	Washington	1
7	Michigan (pen.)	1 (4)
6	UCLA	1 (2)

Final; Sunday, Nov. 17
1	Ohio State	1
7	Michigan	0

== Schedule ==
=== First Round ===
November 7, 2024	#2 Indiana	0–1	#7 Michigan	Bridgeview, IL
12:00 p.m. CST	Jansen Miller (yellow card) 81'	Report	30', (yellow card) 74' Jason Bucknor; (yellow card) 49' Murphy Parker; (yellow card) 67' Team	Stadium: SeatGeek Stadium; Attendance: 179; Referee: Servando Berna; Assistant referees: David Irwin; Ryan Shanklin; Fourth official: Cassidy Moulton

November 7, 2024	#3 Maryland	0–6	#6 UCLA	Bridgeview, IL
2:30 p.m. CST	Dalton Hass (yellow card) 77'	Report	(yellow card) 18' Cam Wilkerson; 34' Jose Contell; 45' Philip Naef; 53' Andre Ochoa; 55' Edrey Caceres; 67' Sveinn Hauksson; 76' Artem Vovk	Stadium: SeatGeek Stadium; Attendance: 107; Referee: Mike Stutt; Assistant referees: Fernando Pina; Ivan Burciaga; Fourth official: Race Williams

November 7, 2024	#4 Washington	0–0 (a.e.t.) (5–3 p)	#5 Michigan State	Bridgeview, IL
5:00 p.m. CST	Joe Dale (yellow card) 89'	Report	(yellow card) 9' Jonathan Stout; (yellow card) 36' Levin Gerhardt; (yellow card) 107' Colin Arce	Stadium: SeatGeek Stadium; Attendance: 113; Referee: Dimitrios Katsimingos; Assistant referees: Quinton McFarlen; Leo Mora; Fourth official: Evangelos Vouris
	Penalties
	Charlie Kosakoff (penalty scored); Nick O'Brien (penalty scored); Chris Meyers (penalty scored); Egor Akulov (penalty scored); Joe Dale (penalty scored)		(penalty scored) Cristiano Bruletti; (penalty scored) Oscar Huerta; (penalty scored) Levin Gerhardt; (penalty missed) Colin Arce

=== Semifinals ===
November 10, 2024	#6 UCLA	1–1 (a.e.t.) (2–4 p)	#7 Michigan	Bridgeview, IL
2:00 p.m. CST	Nicholas Cavallo (yellow card) 48'; Jose Contell 54'; Team (yellow card) 54'; Philip Naef (yellow card) 72'; Andrew Ochoa (yellow card) 81'	Report	21', (yellow card) 22' Uriel Zeitz; (yellow card) 110' Joao Paulo Ramos	Stadium: SeatGeek Stadium; Referee: Calin Radosav; Assistant referees: Besnik Rexhepi; Shane Richards; Fourth official: Cesar Ibarra
	Penalties
	Sveinn Jauksson (penalty missed); Edrey Caceres (penalty scored); Artem Vovk (penalty scored); Tarun Karumanchi (penalty missed)		(penalty scored) Bryce Blevins; (penalty scored) Joao Paulo Ramos; (penalty scored) Beto Soto; (penalty scored) Nolan Miller

November 10, 2024	#1 Ohio State	3–1	#4 Washington	Bridgeview, IL
4:30 p.m. CST	Parker Grinstead 59', 60'; Michael Adedokun (yellow card) 67'; Siggi Magnusson 71'; Anthony Samways (yellow card) 77'; Luciano Pechota (yellow card) 78'; Thomas Gilej (yellow card) 84'; Marko Borkovic (yellow card) 86'	Report	(yellow card) 26' Nick O'Brien; (yellow card) 59' Conner Leber; (yellow card) 75' Harrison Bertos; 77' Ohio State Own Goal	Stadium: SeatGeek Stadium; Referee: Edvin Jurisevic; Assistant referees: Mateusz Dulski; Adrian Werbicki; Fourth official: Christoher Koloffon

=== Final ===
November 17, 2024	#1 Ohio State	1–0	#7 Michigan	Columbus, OH
2:00 p.m. CST	Thomas Gilej (yellow card) 28'; Luciano Pechota (yellow card) 29'; Parker Grinstead 73'	Report	(yellow card) 54' Kamau Brame; (yellow card) 76' Murphy Parker	Stadium: Jesse Owens Memorial Stadium; Attendance: 8,938; Referee: Dimitar Chavdarov; Assistant referees: Art Arustamyan; Cory Richardson; Fourth official: Nikola Aleksic

== Statistics ==
=== Goalscorers ===
There were 14 goals scored in 6 matches, for an average of 2.33 goals per match (as of November 17, 2024).

3 goals

- Parker Grinstead – Ohio State

2 goals

- Jose Contell – UCLA

1 goal

- Jason Bucknor – Michigan
- Edrey Caceres – UCLA
- Sveinn Hauksson – UCLA
- Siggi Magnusson – Ohio State
- Philip Naef – UCLA
- Andre Ochoa – UCLA
- Artem Vovk – UCLA
- Uriel Zeitz – Michigan

== All-Tournament team ==
Player	Team
Charlie Heuer	Indiana
Alex Nitzl	Maryland
Bryce Blevins	Michigan
Jason Bucknor	Michigan
Cristiano Bruletti	Michigan State
**Parker Grinstead**	Ohio State
Siggi Magnusson	Ohio State
Anthony Samways	Ohio State
Max Trejo	Ohio State
Youri Senden	UCLA
Chris Meyers	Washington

MVP in bold
