= 2022 Big Ten Conference men's soccer season =

2022 Big Ten Conference men' soccer season
- League: NCAA Division I
- Sport: Soccer
- Duration: August 2022 through December 2022
- Teams: 8
- TV partner(s): Fox Sports (Fox/FS2, BTN)

2023 MLS SuperDraft
- Top draft pick: Joshua Bolma, 4th overall
- Picked by: New England Revolution

Regular season
- Champions: Maryland
- Season MVP: MD Myers

Tournament
- Champions: Rutgers
- Runners-up: Indiana
- Finals MVP: MD Myers

Men's Soccer seasons
- 2021 2023

2022 Big Ten Conference men's soccer standings
	Conf.					Overall
Team	W		L		T	W		L		T
No. 17 Maryland+	4	–	0	–	4	11	–	4	–	5
Ohio State+	4	–	2	–	2	11	–	3	–	6
Rutgers ‡	4	–	2	–	2	10	–	5	–	6
No. 2 Indiana+	3	–	1	–	4	14	–	4	–	7
Penn State	3	–	2	–	3	6	–	6	–	4
Wisconsin	3	–	4	–	1	6	–	6	–	4
Michigan State	3	–	4	–	1	6	–	9	–	2
Northwestern	1	–	5	–	2	3	–	9	–	5
Michigan	1	–	6	–	1	4	–	10	–	3
‡ – 2022 B1G Tournament champion + – At-large invitation to the 2022 NCAA tournament; As of December 13, 2022; Rankings from United Soccer Coaches; Source: Big Ten

The 2022 Big Ten Conference men's soccer season was the 31st season of college soccer play for the Big Ten Conference and part of the 2022 NCAA Division I men's soccer season. This was the Big Ten's tenth season with 14 teams. The Maryland Terrapins were the Big Ten Champions.

== Previous season ==
Penn State were the Big Ten regular season champions, earning their first Big Ten regular season title since 2013. The Nittany Lions also completed the double by winning the 2021 Big Ten Men's Soccer tournament, making it their first tournament title since 2005. The Nittany Lions earned the conference's automatic berth into the 2021 NCAA Division I Men's Soccer tournament.

Besides Penn State, Big Ten runners-up and third place finishers, Maryland and Indiana, respectively, earned at-large berths into the NCAA tournament. Penn State and Indiana earned national seeds, with Penn State earning the 12th overall seed, while Indiana earned the 15th overall seed. Maryland was eliminated in the opening round by LIU. Indiana reached the third round (Sweet Sixteen) before losing to eventual national runners-up, Washington. Penn State was eliminated by Hofstra by a record 2–8 scoreline.

Two Big Ten players were selected with the first two picks of the 2022 MLS SuperDraft. Maryland's Ben Bender, was selected by expansion club, Charlotte FC with the first overall draft pick. Indiana goalkeeper, Roman Celentano, was selected second overall by FC Cincinnati. Additionally, Farai Mutatu, Brett St. Martin, and Daniel Bloyou were drafted.

== Coaching changes ==
There was one head coaching change ahead of the 2022 season. Wisconsin head coach, John Trask was relieved of his duties following the 2021 season. Wisconsin hired Loyola Chicago head coach, Neil Jones.

=== Coaches ===
Note: All stats current through the completion of the 2021 season

Team	Head coach	Previous job	Years at school	Overall record	Record at school	B1G record
Indiana	Todd Yeagley	Wisconsin	11	129–54–36 (.671)	122–45–34 (.692)	35–15–18 (.647)
Maryland	Sasho Cirovski	Hartford	28	412–156–60 (.704)	386–143–53 (.709)	24–9–7 (.688)
Michigan	Chaka Daley	Providence	9	151–165–48 (.481)	61–54–21 (.526)	23–20–9 (.529)
Michigan State	Damon Rensing	Michigan State (asst.)	12	117–66–30 (.620)	117–66–30 (.620)	31–26–13 (.536)
Northwestern	Tim Lenahan	Lafayette	20	305–209–72 (.582)	169–140–51 (.540)	36–60–20 (.397)
Ohio State	Brian Maisonneuve	Indiana (asst.)	4	17–41–5 (.310)	17–41–5 (.310)	6–24–3 (.227)
Penn State	Jeff Cook	Bethlehem Steel (asst.)	4	220–160–57 (.569)	40–22–8 (.629)	21–7–4 (.719)
Rutgers	Jim McElderry	Fordham	3	147–152–43 (.493)	24–29–7 (.458)	10–20–2 (.344)
Wisconsin	Neil Jones	Loyola	1	81–54–24 (.585)	0–0–0 (–)	0–0–0 (–)

== Preseason ==
=== Recruiting classes ===
Rankings
Team	TDS	CSN	Signees
Indiana			7
Maryland			8
Michigan			8
Michigan State			9
Northwestern			6
Ohio State			6
Penn State			7
Rutgers			8
Wisconsin			9

=== Preseason Coaches polls ===
The preseason polls will be released in August 2022. Below are the results of the media poll with total points received next to each school and first-place votes in parentheses.

Predicted finish	Team	Votes (1st place)
1		
2		
3		
4		
5		
6		
7		
8		
9		

=== Preseason awards ===
==== All−American Teams ====
USC 1st Team	USC 2nd Team	TDS 1st Team	TDS 2nd Team	CSN 1st Team	CSN 2nd Team

==== Preseason All Big Ten ====
First Team

Second Team

All Big Ten Honorable Mention (received votes from four or more members of the media):

- Indiana:
- Maryland:
- Michigan:
- Michigan State:
- Northwestern:
- Ohio State:
- Penn State:
- Rutgers:
- Wisconsin:

== Postseason ==
=== NCAA Tournament ===
Seed	Region	School	1st round	2nd round	3rd round	Quarterfinals	Semifinals	Championship
13	2	Indiana	BYE	W 1–0 vs. Saint Louis – (Bloomington)	W 1–0 vs. Marshall – (Bloomington)	W 2–0 at (12) UNC Greensboro – (Greensboro)	W 2–0 vs. Pittsburgh – (Cary)	T 2–2 (L 6–7 p) vs. (3) Syracuse – (Cary)
—N/a	3	Rutgers	L 0–3 at Penn – (Philadelphia)	—	—	—	—	—
W–L–D (%):			0–1–0 (.000)	1–0–0 (1.000)	1–0–0 (1.000)	1–0–0 (1.000)	1–0–0 (1.000)	0–0–1 (.500) Total: 4–1–1 (.750)

== Rankings ==
=== National rankings ===
	Improvement in ranking
	Drop in ranking
RV	Received votes but were not ranked in Top 25
NV	No votes received

		Pre	Wk 1	Wk 2	Wk 3	Wk 4	Wk 5	Wk 6	Wk 7	Wk 8	Wk 9	Wk 10	Wk 11	Wk 12	Wk 13	Wk 14	Wk 15	Final
Indiana	USC	13	21	RV	15	16	RV	NV	RV	RV	NV	RV	RV	None released				2
Indiana	TDS	8	10	11	8	16	19	18	16	18	21			24	15	8	4	2
Indiana	CSN	5																
Maryland	USC	20	9	14	8	9	8	8	7	8	8	7	6	None released				17
Maryland	TDS	17	12	19	7	5	6	5	6	6	8	8	5	8	18	19	20	21
Maryland	CSN	20																
Michigan	USC	NV												None released				
Michigan	TDS	NV																
Michigan	CSN	NV																
Michigan State	USC	NV												None released				
Michigan State	TDS	NV																
Michigan State	CSN	NV																
Northwestern	USC	NV												None released				
Northwestern	TDS	NV																
Northwestern	CSN	NV																
Ohio State	USC	NV			22	13	11	17	15	13	13	18	16	None released				
Ohio State	TDS	NV			24	13	17	17	17	19	18	24	24					
Ohio State	CSN	NV																
Penn State	USC	21	NV				20	NV						None released				
Penn State	TDS	14	19	16	22	18	13	24	25									
Penn State	CSN	22																
Rutgers	USC	NV												None released				
Rutgers	TDS	NV												18				
Rutgers	CSN	NV																
Wisconsin	USC	NV												None released				
Wisconsin	TDS	NV																
Wisconsin	CSN	NV																

=== Regional rankings - USC Midwest Region ===
	Improvement in ranking
	Drop in ranking
RV	Received votes but were not ranked in Top 10
NV	No votes received

The United Soccer Coaches' Midwest region ranks teams across the Big Ten, Horizon, and Missouri Valley Conferences.

	Wk 1	Wk 2	Wk 3	Wk 4	Wk 5	Wk 6	Wk 7	Wk 8	Wk 9	Wk 10	Wk 11	Wk 12
Indiana												
Maryland												
Michigan												
Michigan State												
Northwestern												
Ohio State												
Penn State												
Rutgers												
Wisconsin												

== Awards and honors ==
=== Player of the week honors ===
Following each week's games, Big Ten conference officials select the player of the week.

Week	Player	School	Pos.	Ref.
Aug. 30	Laurence Wootton	Ohio State	M	
Aug. 30	William Kulvik	Maryland	D	
Sep. 6	Peter Mangione	Penn State	F	
Sep. 6	Keagan McLaughlin	Ohio State	GK	
Sep. 13	Malcolm Johnston	Maryland	M	
Sep. 13	Marko Borkovic	Ohio State	M	
Sep. 13	Niklas Neumann	Maryland	GK	
Sep. 13	Keagan McLaughlin	Ohio State	GK	
Sep. 20	Xavier Green	Ohio State	M	
Sep. 20	Jackson Temple	Rutgers	F	
Sep. 20	Chris Rindov	Maryland	D	
Sep. 27	Tyger Evans	Penn State	M	
Sep. 27	Nick Richardson	Maryland	D	
Oct. 4	Herbert Endeley	Indiana	F	
Oct. 4	Owen Finnerty	Michigan State	GK	
Oct. 11	Liam Butts	Penn State	F	
Oct. 11	Nick Richardson	Maryland	D	
Oct. 18	Ryan Wittenbrink	Indiana	F	
Oct. 18	Carter Abbott	Wisconsin	GK	
Oct. 25	MD Myers	Rutgers	F	
Oct. 25	William Kulvik	Maryland	D	
Nov. 1	Stefan Copetti	Maryland	F	
Nov. 1	Chris Rindov	Maryland	D	

=== Postseason honors ===
Unanimous selections in bold.

**2022 B1G Men's Soccer Individual Awards**
Award	Recipient(s)
Offensive Player of the Year	**MD Myers, Rutgers**
Midfielder of the Year	Laurence Wootton, Ohio State
Defensive Player of the Year	Daniel Munie, Indiana
Goalkeeper of the Year	Keagan McLaughlin, Ohio State
Coach of the Year	Sasho Cirovski, Maryland
Co-Freshman of the Year	Cole Cruthers, Rutgers
Co-Freshman of the Year	Jonathan Stout, Michigan State

**2022 B1G Men's Soccer All-Conference Teams**
First Team Honorees	Second Team Honorees	All-Freshman Team Honorees
Forward		Jack Wagoner, Indiana
Joshua Bolma, So., Maryland	Tommy Mihalic, So., Indiana	**Luca Costabile, Maryland**
**Peter Mangione, Jr., Penn State**	Liam Butts, Sr., Penn State	**Nick Kaloukian, Michigan**
**MD Myers, Sr., Rutgers**	Max Keenan, Jr., Wisconsin	Nolan Miller, Michigan
Midfield		Jake Spadafora, Michigan State
Ryan Wittenbrink, Sr., Indiana	Herbert Endeley, Sr., Indiana	**Jonathan Stout, Michigan State**
Malcolm Johnston, Sr., Maryland	Xavier Green, Sr., Ohio State	Jason Gajadhar, Northwestern
Laurence Wootton, Jr., Ohio State	Jason Bouregy, Jr., Rutgers	Tanner Creech, Ohio State
Seth Kuhn, Gr., Penn State	Tim Bielic, Sr., Wisconsin	**Luciano Pechota, Ohio State**
Defense		Matthew Henderson, Penn State
Daniel Munie, Sr., Indiana	Anthony Samways, So., Ohio State	Ben Liscum, Penn State
Nick Richardson, Sr., Maryland	Obafemi Awodesu, Jr., Penn State	Ian Abbey, Rutgers
Chris Rindov, Sr., Maryland	Hugo Le Guennec, Sr., Rutgers	Cole Cruthers, Rutgers
Goalkeeper		Ciran Dalton, Rutgers
Keagan McLaughlin, Sr., Ohio State	Owen Finnerty, Sr., Michigan State	

== MLS SuperDraft ==
=== Total picks by school ===
Team	Round 1	Round 2	Round 3	Total
Indiana	2	1	–	3
Maryland	2	1	1	4
Michigan	–	–	–	0
Michigan State	–	–	–	0
Northwestern	–	–	–	0
Ohio State	–	–	–	0
Penn State	–	2	1	3
Rutgers	–	–	1	1
Wisconsin	–	–	–	0
Total	4	4	3	11

=== List of selections ===
Round	Pick #	MLS team	Player	Position	College
1	4	New England Revolution	(Ghana) Joshua Bolma	MF	Maryland
1	10	San Jose Earthquakes	(United States) Daniel Munie	DF	Indiana
1	24	FC Dallas	(United States) Herbert Endeley	FW	Indiana
1	26	New York City FC	(Canada) Malcolm Johnston	MF	Maryland
2	32	Toronto FC	(Canada) Jalen Watson	DF	Penn State
2	33	San Jose Earthquakes	(Guyana) Liam Butts	FW	Penn State
2	37	Sporting Kansas City	(United States) Chris Rindov	DF	Maryland
2	53	FC Dallas	(United States) Ryan Wittenbrink	FW	Indiana
3	62	San Jose Earthquakes	(United States) Hunter George	FW	Maryland
3	66	New York City FC	(United States) MD Myers	FW	Rutgers
3	69	Charlotte FC	(United States) Andrew Privett	MF	Penn State

== See also ==
- 2022 Big Ten Conference women's soccer season
