= Malcolm Johnston =

Malcolm Johnston may refer to:

- Malcolm Johnston (soccer), Canadian soccer player
- Malcolm Johnston (jockey), Australian retired jockey
