= 2022 Maryland Terrapins men's soccer team =

77th season in program history, current Big Ten Champions

2022 Maryland Terrapins men's soccer

Big Ten Conference Champions

NCAA tournament, 2nd Round, L 1–2 at No. 4 Cornell
- Conference: Big Ten Conference
- U. Soc. Coaches poll: No. 17
- TopDrawerSoccer.com: No. 21
- Record: 11–4–5 (4–0–4 Big Ten Conference)
- Head coach: Sasho Cirovski (16th season)
- Associate head coach: Jake Pace
- Assistant coach: Mike Vaughn
- Home stadium: Ludwig Field, College Park, Maryland

2022 Big Ten Conference men's soccer standings
	Conf.					Overall
Team	W		L		T	W		L		T
No. 17 Maryland+	4	–	0	–	4	11	–	4	–	5
Ohio State+	4	–	2	–	2	11	–	3	–	6
Rutgers ‡	4	–	2	–	2	10	–	5	–	6
No. 2 Indiana+	3	–	1	–	4	14	–	4	–	7
Penn State	3	–	2	–	3	6	–	6	–	4
Wisconsin	3	–	4	–	1	6	–	6	–	4
Michigan State	3	–	4	–	1	6	–	9	–	2
Northwestern	1	–	5	–	2	3	–	9	–	5
Michigan	1	–	6	–	1	4	–	10	–	3
‡ – 2022 B1G Tournament champion + – At-large invitation to the 2022 NCAA tournament; As of December 13, 2022; Rankings from United Soccer Coaches; Source: Big Ten

The 2022 Maryland Terrapins men's soccer team represented the University of Maryland, College Park in the 2022 NCAA Division I men's soccer season. It was the 77th season of university fielding a program. Maryland finished the regular season with a 9–2–5 record, winning the Big Ten Conference. The Terrapins finished the season ranked No. 17/21.

== Schedule ==
=== Exhibition matches ===
Date Time, TV	Rank^{#}	Opponent^{#}	Result	Record	Site City, State
August 12*; 7:00 pm	No. 20	at VCU	T 1-1		Sports Backers Stadium; Richmond, Virginia
August 13*; 7:30 pm	No. 20	American	W 2-0		Ludwig Field; College Park, Maryland
August 19*; 6:30 pm	No. 20	No. 14 Marshall	W 2-1		Ludwig Field; College Park, Maryland
*Non-conference game. ^{#}Rankings from United Soccer Coaches. (#) Tournament seedings in parentheses.

=== Regular season ===
Date Time, TV	Rank^{#}	Opponent^{#}	Result	Record	Site City, State
August 25*; 6:00 pm	No. 20	No. 9 New Hampshire	W 2-1	1–0–0	Ludwig Field; College Park, Maryland
August 28*; 7:00 pm, BTN	No. 20	Liberty	T 1–1	1–0–1	Ludwig Field; College Park, Maryland
September 2*; 7:30 pm, BTN	No. 9	No. 20 Denver	L 0–2	1–1–1	Ludwig Field; College Park, Maryland
September 5*; 6:00 pm	No. 9	at Virginia	W 6–1	2–1–1	Audi Field; Washington, D.C.
September 10*; 1:00 pm	No. 14	at No. 21 Georgetown	W 2–1	3–1–1	Shaw Field; Washington, D.C.
September 16; 6:30 pm, BTN	No. 8	at Michigan	W 2–1	4–1–1 (1–0–0)	U-M Soccer Stadium; Ann Arbor, Michigan
September 20; 7:00 pm, BTN	No. 9	Penn State	T 3–3	4–1–2 (1–0–1)	Ludwig Field; College Park, Maryland
September 25; 1:00 pm, BTN+	No. 9	No. 13 Ohio State	W 1–0	5–1–2 (2–0–1)	Ludwig Field; College Park, Maryland
September 30*; 7:00 pm, BTN+	No. 8	Old Dominion	W 1–0	6–1–2	Ludwig Field; College Park, Maryland
October 4; 3:45 pm, BTN	No. 8	at Rutgers	W 3–2	7–1–2 (3–0–1)	Miller Family Soccer Complex; Piscataway, New Jersey
October 9; 1:00 pm, BTN+	No. 8	at Northwestern	T 1–1	7–1–3 (3–0–2)	Lanny and Sharon Martin Stadium; Evanston, Illinois
October 14; 5:00 pm, ESPNU	No. 7	Wisconsin	T 2–2	7–1–4 (3–0–3)	Ludwig Field; College Park, Maryland
October 17*; 7:00 pm, BTN+	No. 7	High Point	L 1–2	7–2–4	Ludwig Field; College Park, Maryland
October 21; 7:00 pm, BTN+	No. 8	Michigan State	W 1–0	8–2–4 (4–0–3)	Ludwig Field; College Park, Maryland
October 25; 7:00 pm, BTN+	No. 8	Delaware	W 4–1	9–2–4	Ludwig Field; College Park, Maryland
October 30; 1:00 pm, BTN	No. 8	at Indiana	T 1–2	9–2–5 (4–0–4)	Bill Armstrong Stadium; Bloomington, Indiana
*Non-conference game. ^{#}Rankings from United Soccer Coaches. (#) Tournament seedings in parentheses.

=== Big Ten tournament ===
Date Time, TV	Rank^{#}	Opponent^{#}	Result	Record	Site City, State
November 4; 7:00 pm, BTN+	(1) No. 7	(8) Northwestern; Quarterfinals	W 1–0	10–2–5	Ludwig Field; College Park, Maryland
November 9; 8:00 pm, BTN	(1) No. 6	(4) Indiana; Semifinals	L 1–2	10–3–5	Ludwig Field; College Park, Maryland
*Non-conference game. ^{#}Rankings from United Soccer Coaches. (#) Tournament seedings in parentheses.

=== NCAA tournament ===
Date Time, TV	Rank^{#}	Opponent^{#}	Result	Record	Site City, State
November 17*; 6:00 pm, ESPN+	No. 6	Fairleigh Dickinson; First round	W 5–2	11–3–5	Ludwig Field; College Park, Maryland
November 20*; 2:00 pm, ESPN+	No. 6	at (14) No. 16 Cornell; Second round	L 1–2	11–4–5	Berman Field; Ithaca, New York
*Non-conference game. ^{#}Rankings from United Soccer Coaches. (#) Tournament seedings in parentheses.

== See also ==
- Maryland Terrapins
