= Christopher Tiao =

Taiwanese footballer (born 2001)

Personal information
- Full name: Christopher Tian-Long Tiao
- Date of birth: May 30, 2001 (age 25)
- Place of birth: Randolph, New Jersey, United States
- Height: 5 ft 11 in (1.80 m)
- Position: Left-back

Team information
- Current team: One Knoxville SC
- Number: 2

Youth career
- 2017–2019: New York Red Bulls

College career
Years	Team	Apps	(Gls)
2019–2024	Rutgers Scarlet Knights	63	(2)

Senior career*
Years	Team	Apps	(Gls)
2019	New York Red Bulls II	1	(0)
2024–2025	New York City II	44	(2)
2026–	One Knoxville SC	17	(0)

International career^{‡}
2024–	Chinese Taipei	9	(1)
- * Club domestic league appearances and goals as of 1 November 2026 ‡ National team caps and goals as of 13 November 2026

Christopher Tian-Long Tiao (born May 30, 2001) is a footballer who plays as a left-back for One Knoxville SC. Born in the United States, he represents the Chinese Taipei national team.

== Club career ==
=== Youth, College & Amateur ===
Tiao is a member of the New York Red Bulls Academy. During the 2019 USL Championship season he appeared for New York Red Bulls II.

Later in 2019, Tiao has committed to play college soccer at Rutgers University.

== International career ==
Tiao made his debut for the Chinese Taipei national team on 11 October 2024 in a friendly against Cambodia where he recorded an assist.

On 18 November 2024, Tiao scored his first international goal in a friendly match against Singapore. On 11 December 2024, Tiao assisted two goals against Mongolia in the preliminary round of the 2025 EAFF E-1 Football Championship.

International goals
No	Date	Venue	Opponent	Score	Results	Competition
1	18 November 2024	Singapore National Stadium, Kallang Singapore	Singapore	1–0	3–2	Friendly
