= Bobby Joe Esposito =

American soccer player (born 1964)

Personal information
- Full name: Robert Joseph Esposito
- Date of birth: December 12, 1964 (age 61)
- Place of birth: Bethlehem, Pennsylvania, U.S.
- Height: 5 ft 11 in (1.80 m)
- Position: Forward

College career
Years	Team	Apps	(Gls)
1983–1986	Rutgers Scarlet Knights		

Senior career*
Years	Team	Apps	(Gls)
1987–1988	Cleveland Force (indoor)	37	(10)
1988–1989	Los Angeles Lazers (loan)	41	(10)
1989	California Kickers		(1)
1989–1991	Atlanta Attack (indoor)	68	(67)
1991–1993	Kansas City Attack (indoor)	81	(87)
1995–1997	Baltimore Spirit (indoor)	67	(45)
1997–2000	Philadelphia KiXX (indoor)	108	(33)

Managerial career
- 2000–2001: Philadelphia KiXX (assistant)
- * Club domestic league appearances and goals

Robert Joseph "Bobby Joe" Esposito (born December 12, 1964 ) is an American retired soccer forward who played professionally in the Western Soccer Alliance, Major Indoor Soccer League and National Professional Soccer League.

== Youth ==
In 1983, Esposito graduated from Riverside High School. During his four year high school career, Esposito scored 150 goals and went to three New Jersey High School soccer championships. In 2003, Riverside inducted Esposito into its Hall of Fame. Esposito attended Rutgers University, playing on the men's soccer team from 1983 to 1986. He was a 1986 All American and is in second place on the school's career goals and points lists and fourth on the career assists list. In 1999, Rutgers inducted Esposito into the school's Hall of Fame.

== Professional ==
In 1987, the Cleveland Force selected Esposito in the third round of the Major Indoor Soccer League draft. When the Force folded in 1988, he moved to the Los Angeles Lazers. The Lazers folded a year later. On July 11, 1989, the Dallas Sidekicks selected Esposito in the first round of the dispersal draft, but he chose to join the Lazer's coach, Keith Tozer, in a move to the Atlanta Attack of the National Professional Soccer League instead. He also spent the 1989 outdoor season with the California Kickers of the Western Soccer Alliance. In 1992, the Spirit traded Esposito to the Kansas City Attack in exchange for a 1993 draft choice. In 1994, Esposito retired and moved his family to New Jersey. In 1995, he decided to return to professional soccer, so he signed with the Baltimore Spirit. In 1997, the Philadelphia KiXX purchased Esposito's contract from the Spirit. Esposito retired in 2000 but spent the 2000–2001 season as an assistant coach with the KiXX.

== Retirement ==
After Bobby-Joe Esposito's professional soccer career he retired and moved to New Jersey to be with his family. He has 3 children, Gabrielle(the oldest), Caleb(the middle child), and Rachel(the youngest). His wife's name is Ruth. He still is playing indoor, but just for a small fun league. He also coaches Caleb and Rachel on their soccer teams.
