= Joey Zalinsky =

American soccer player (born 2003)

Personal information
- Full name: Joseph Zalinsky
- Date of birth: January 3, 2003 (age 23)
- Place of birth: Brick Township, New Jersey, U.S.
- Height: 1.78 m (5 ft 10 in)
- Position: Defender

Youth career
- 2016–2021: New York Red Bulls

College career
Years	Team	Apps	(Gls)
2021–2024	Rutgers Scarlet Knights	59	(2)

Senior career*
Years	Team	Apps	(Gls)
2020–2021	New York Red Bulls II	17	(0)
2025	St. Louis City	4	(0)
2025	→ St. Louis City 2 (loan)	2	(0)
2025	→ Indy Eleven (loan)	7	(0)
- * Club domestic league appearances and goals as of 16:01, December 23, 2025 (UTC)

Joseph "Joey" Zalinsky (born January 3, 2003) is an American professional soccer player who most recently played as a defender for Major League Soccer club St. Louis City SC.

A resident of Brick Township, New Jersey, Zalinsky played prep soccer at Brick Memorial High School.

== Career ==
Zalinsky has played with the New York Red Bulls academy since 2016.

During the 2020 USL Championship season Zalinsky appeared for New York Red Bulls II. He made his debut on September 9, 2020, starting in a 6–0 win over Philadelphia Union II.

In the fall of 2021, Zalinsky moved to Rutgers University to play college soccer.

On December 20, 2024, Zalinsky was drafted by St. Louis City SC in the 2025 MLS SuperDraft.

On September 8, 2025, Zalinsky joined USL Championship side Indy Eleven on loan for the remainder of the season. He returned to St. Louis following the end of the season after making 7 league appearances.

Zalinsky's contract option was declined by St. Louis City SC on November 25, 2025.
