= Malcolm Johnston (soccer) =

Canadian soccer player (born 2001)

Personal information
- Date of birth: February 12, 2001 (age 25)
- Place of birth: Aurora, Ontario, Canada
- Height: 6 ft 0 in (1.83 m)
- Position: Midfielder

Youth career
- Richmond Hill SC
- –2019: Vaughan Azzurri

College career
Years	Team	Apps	(Gls)
2019–2022	Maryland Terrapins	61	(14)

Senior career*
Years	Team	Apps	(Gls)
2018–2019	Vaughan Azzurri	2	(0)
2023	Whitecaps FC 2	18	(2)
2024–2025	Portland Timbers 2	38	(0)
- * Club domestic league appearances and goals as of 29 December 2025

Malcolm Johnston (born February 12, 2001) is a Canadian soccer player who is currently a free agent.

== Early life ==
Johnston played youth soccer with Vaughan Azzurri. He also played hockey in his youth, but chose to pursue a soccer career instead.

== College career ==
In March 2019, he committed to attend the University of Maryland, College Park and play for the men's soccer team, beginning in the fall. On August 30, 2019, he scored the game-winning goal in his collegiate debut, just four minutes after entering the match as a substitute, in a 1-0 victory over the South Florida Bulls. He played a major role in his first season and was named to the Big Ten Conference All-Freshman Team at the end of the season. During his sophomore and junior seasons, he earned Fall Academic All-Big Ten Accolades. During his senior season, he was named the Big Ten Co-Offensive Player of the Week in September 2022. At the end of the season, he was named to the All-Big Ten First Team, the All-North Region Second Team, the Academic All-Big Ten Team, the 2022 Big Ten All-Tournament Team, and was invited to participate in the MLS College Showcase. He was also awarded the Terrapins 'goal of the season' with a bicycle kick against the Rutgers Scarlet Knights. He also served as team captain during his junior and senior seasons and finished his college career with 14 goals and 13 assists. He also served as the team's primary penalty kick taker in 2022.

== Club career ==
During 2018 and 2019, he played with Vaughan Azzurri in League1 Ontario, during the NCAA offseasons.

Johnston was selected in the first round (26th overall) of the 2023 MLS SuperDraft by New York City FC. He attended pre-season with the club, but did not ultimately sign with the team.

In February 2023, he signed a professional contract with Whitecaps FC 2 in MLS Next Pro. On May 29, 2023, Johnston scored his first professional goal in a 2–2 draw against LA Galaxy II.

Johnston signed with Portland Timbers 2 on March 14, 2024. Following the 2024 season, the Timbers exercised Johnston's contract option for the 2025 season.

== Personal life ==
He is the younger brother of Canada national team player Alistair Johnston.

== Career statistics ==
As of October 1, 2023

Club	Season	League			Playoffs		Domestic Cup		Continental		Total	
Club	Season	Division	Apps	Goals	Apps	Goals	Apps	Goals	Apps	Goals	Apps	Goals
Vaughan Azzurri	2018	League1 Ontario	1	0	1	0	—		—		2	0
Vaughan Azzurri	2019	League1 Ontario	1	0	0	0	0	0	—		1	0
Vaughan Azzurri	Total		2	0	1	0	0	0	0	0	3	0
Whitecaps FC 2	2023	MLS Next Pro	17	2	—		—		—		17	0
Career total			19	2	1	0	0	0	0	0	20	0
