= Samuel Sarver =

American soccer player (born 2003)

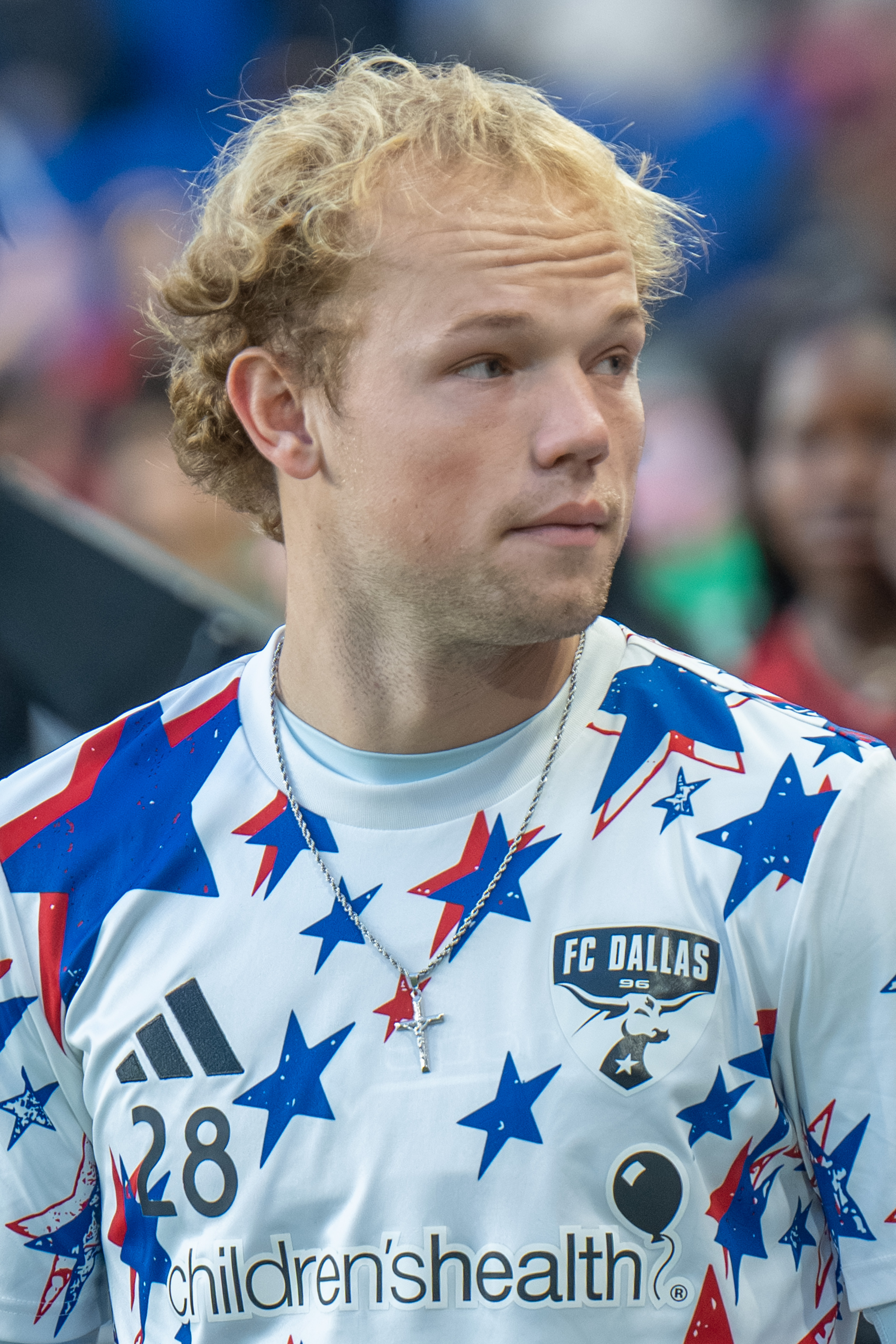
- Sarver with FC Dallas in 2026

Personal information
- Date of birth: 3 March 2003 (age 23)
- Place of birth: Chesterland, Ohio, U.S.
- Height: 1.78 m (5 ft 10 in)
- Position: Winger

Team information
- Current team: FC Dallas
- Number: 28

Youth career
- 2016–2021: Cleveland Internationals
- 2017–2021: Columbus Crew

College career
| Years | Team | Apps | (Gls) |
| 2021–2024 | Indiana Hoosiers | 90 | (24) |

Senior career*
| Years | Team | Apps | (Gls) |
| 2021 | Fort Wayne FC | 4 | (0) |
| 2022 | Long Island Rough Riders | 2 | (0) |
| 2023 | FC Motown | 8 | (3) |
| 2024 | Akron City FC | 10 | (8) |
| 2024–2025 | North Texas SC | 25 | (19) |
| 2025 | → FC Dallas (loan) | 2 | (0) |
| 2025– | FC Dallas | 13 | (3) |

International career^{‡}
| 2019 | United States U16 | 5 | (1) |
- * Club domestic league appearances and goals as of 16:07, 8 August 2025 (UTC) ‡ National team caps and goals as of 16:07, 8 August 2025 (UTC)

Samuel Sarver (born 3 March 2003) is an American professional soccer player who plays as a winger for the Major League Soccer club FC Dallas.

== Club career ==
Sarver is a product of the youth academies of the Croatia Cleveland Juniors, Cleveland Internationals and Columbus Crew Academy. He briefly played with Fort Wayne FC in 2021. In 2021, he joined the Indiana Hoosiers and helped them win the 2023 Big Ten men's soccer tournament. He played with the Long Island Rough Riders for a pair of games in the USL League Two in 2022. On 8 May 2023, he signed with FC Motown for the 2023 season. In 2024, he had a short stint with Akron City FC where he was named the 2024 Great Lakes Conference MVP and 2024 NPSL Young Player of the Year.

Sarver was selected 41st in the 2025 MLS SuperDraft by FC Dallas, in the second round, on 19 December 2024. On 28 January 2025, he signed his first professional contract with FC Dallas' reserve team North Texas SC for the 2025 MLS Next Pro season with an option to extend until 2026. On 28 June 2024, he signed a short-term loan deal with FC Dallas for a set of Major League Soccer matches. On 4 July 2025, he made his MLS debut against Minnesota United FC. On 24 July 2025, he formally signed with FC Dallas on a deal through 2026, with options to extend until 2027 and 2028 after scoring 14 goals in 18 games with North Texas SC.

== International career ==
Sarver played for the United States U16s for Nike Friendlies and 4 Nations Tournament in 2019 in the Czech Republic.

== Personal life ==
In May 2023, Sarver advocated for the importance of mental health, after revealing that he previously struggled with depression and suicidal thoughts that were triggered after the death of his cousin.

== Honors ==
Indiana Hoosiers

- Big Ten men's soccer tournament: 2023
- Big Ten Conference men's regular soccer season: 2023, 2024

Individual

- 2023 Big Ten men's Most Valuable Offensive Player
- 2024 Great Lakes Conference MVP
- 2024 NPSL Young Player of the Year
