= Marko Borkovic =

English footballer

Personal information
- Date of birth: 15 October 2003 (age 23)
- Place of birth: Slough, England
- Position: Winger

Team information
- Current team: Ohio State Buckeyes

Youth career
- 2012–2019: Wycombe Wanderers
- 2019–2020: Maidenhead United
- 2020–2021: Derby County

College career
Years	Team	Apps	(Gls)
2022–	Ohio State Buckeyes	34	(14)

Senior career*
Years	Team	Apps	(Gls)
2021–2022	Derby County	1	(0)
- * Club domestic league appearances and goals as of 19:59, 27 February 2023 (UTC)

Marko Borkovic (Serbian Cyrillic: Марко Борковић; born 15 October 2003) is an English footballer who plays as a winger for Ohio State Buckeyes.

== Career ==
Borkovic made his debut for Derby County as a substitute in a 2–1 EFL Cup loss against Sheffield United on 24 August 2021.

On 2 May 2022, Borkovic joined Ohio State Buckeyes.

== Career statistics ==
As of match played 24 August 2021

Appearances and goals by club, season and competition
Club	Season	League			FA Cup		EFL Cup		Other		Total	
Club	Season	Division	Apps	Goals	Apps	Goals	Apps	Goals	Apps	Goals	Apps	Goals
Derby County	2021–22	Championship	0	0	0	0	1	0	0	0	1	0
Career total			0	0	0	0	1	0	0	0	1	0
