= Jason Bucknor =

American soccer player

Personal information
- Full name: Jason Sean Andrade Bucknor
- Date of birth: March 17, 2002 (age 24)
- Place of birth: Weston, Florida, United States
- Height: 1.82 m (6 ft 0 in)
- Positions: Defender; winger

Youth career
- –2019: Weston FC
- 2019–2021: Inter Miami

College career
Years	Team	Apps	(Gls)
2021–2024	Michigan Wolverines	59	(9)

Senior career*
Years	Team	Apps	(Gls)
2020–2021	Inter Miami II	13	(0)
2024	Weston FC	3	(0)
2025	LA Galaxy	0	(0)
2025	→ Ventura County (loan)	24	(1)
2026	Drogheda United	19	(0)

International career^{‡}
2015	United States U15		
- * Club domestic league appearances and goals as of 16:48, 14 October 2026 (UTC) ‡ National team caps and goals as of 00:09, 5 August 2026 (UTC)

Jason Sean Andrade Bucknor (born 17 March 2002) is an American professional association footballer who plays as a defender.

== Club career ==
=== Early career ===
Bucknor is a native of Weston, Florida and attended Cypress Bay High School as well as playing for local club Weston FC, before joining the academy at Inter Miami in 2019. In 2019 and 2020, he featured for their reserve team Inter Miami II 13 times in the USL League One. In 2021, he started at University of Michigan, majoring in communications & media and playing for the Michigan Wolverines 59 times over 4 years, scoring 9 goals and assisting a further 5. In his senior year in college in 2024, he also played 3 games in USL League Two for Weston FC.

=== LA Galaxy ===
In December 2024, he was selected by LA Galaxy in the First Round of the MLS SuperDraft. In early 2025, he took part in pre-season with the first team. Bucknor made 24 appearances for Galaxy's reserve team Ventura County in the 2025 MLS Next Pro season.

=== Drogheda United ===
On 11 January 2026, he signed for League of Ireland Premier Division club Drogheda United after his agency sent a video of his performances to manager Kevin Doherty who was impressed enough to sign him. On 17 January 2026, he made his debut, scoring his first goal for the club in a 1–1 draw with Longford Town in the Leinster Senior Cup. He suffered multiple injuries in his first few months with the club but impressed upon his return to the team. On 14 October 2026, it was announced that Bucknor had departed the club due to personal reasons, after making 22 appearances in all competitions.

== International career ==
In December 2015, Bucknor was called up to the United States U15 squad.

== Career statistics ==
As of match played 28 August 2026

Appearances and goals by club, season and competition
Club	Season	League			National Cup (Note: Includes U.S. Open Cup & FAI Cup)		Other		Total	
Club	Season	Division	Apps	Goals	Apps	Goals	Apps	Goals	Apps	Goals
Inter Miami II	2020	USL League One	10	0	—		—		10	0
Inter Miami II	2021	USL League One	3	0	—		—		3	0
Inter Miami II	Total		13	0	—		—		13	0
Weston	2024	USL League Two	3	0	—		—		3	0
LA Galaxy	2025	Major League Soccer	0	0	0	0	0	0	0	0
Ventura County (loan)	2025	MLS Next Pro	24	1	2	1	1 (Note: Appearance in the 2025 MLS Next Pro Playoffs)	0	27	2
Drogheda United	2026	LOI Premier Division	19	0	2	0	1 (Note: Appearance in the Leinster Senior Cup)	1	22	1
Total			59	1	4	1	2	2	65	4
