= Rutgers Scarlet Knights men's soccer =

Men's soccer team of Rutgers University

- 2023 Rutgers Scarlet Knights men's soccer team
- Founded: 1938; 88 years ago (Note: Although Rutgers fielded its first soccer team in 1938, the first de facto college football game held in 1869 between Ruters and Princeton Universities (with rules based on The Football Association) is considered the first "not official" collegiate soccer match and the birth of the sport in the United States.)
- University: Rutgers University–New Brunswick
- Head coach: Jim McElderry (5th season)
- Conference: Big Ten
- Location: New Brunswick, New Jersey, US
- Stadium: Yurcak Field (capacity: 5,000)
- Nickname: Scarlet Knights
- Colors: Scarlet
Home	Away

NCAA tournament runner-up
- 1990

NCAA tournament College Cup
- 1989, 1990, 1994

NCAA tournament appearances
- 1960, 1961, 1983, 1987, 1989, 1990, 1991, 1993, 1994, 1996, 1997, 1999, 2001, 2003, 2006, 2011, 2015, 2022

Conference tournament championships
- 1990, 1991, 1993, 1994, 1997, 2022

The Rutgers Scarlet Knights men's soccer team is a varsity intercollegiate athletic team of Rutgers University–New Brunswick in New Brunswick, New Jersey, United States. The team is a member of the Big Ten Conference, which is part of the National Collegiate Athletic Association's Division I. Rutgers's first varsity's men's soccer team was fielded in 1938, although organized soccer has been played at the university since at least 1869. The team plays its home games at Yurcak Field in New Brunswick. The Knights are coached by Jim McElderry.

== History ==
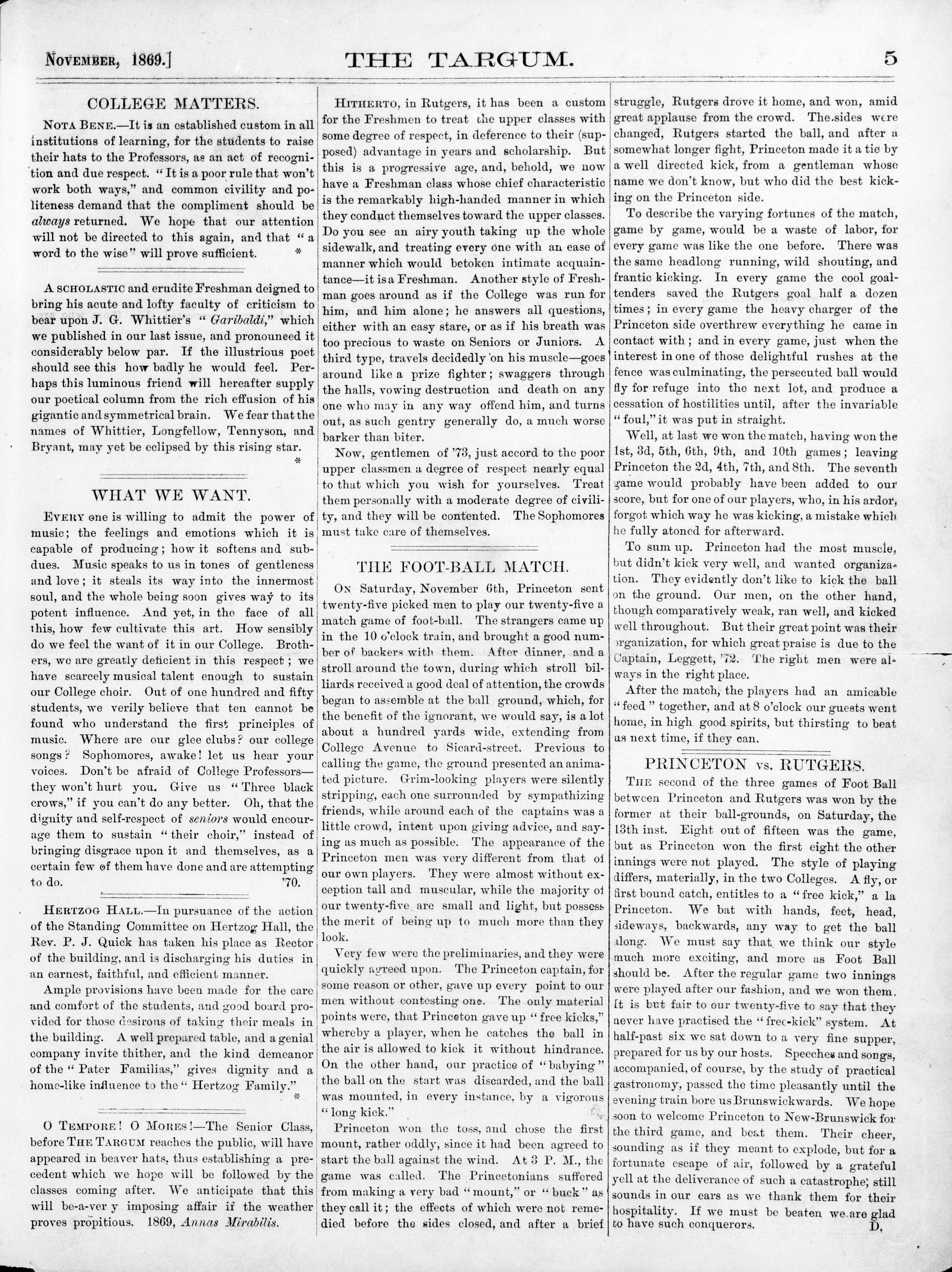
"The Foot-Ball Match", Chronicle of the first game at The Targum, Nov 1869

The origins of Rutgers soccer trace back to 1869, where the first ever collegiate football game was played in the United States. The then-Rutgers College (now Rutgers University) and the College of New Jersey (now Princeton University) played an exhibition match that was won by Rutgers 6–4. In addition to being considered one of the earliest soccer games reported in the United States, these two games are considered to be the first organized American college football games to ever be played.

Rutgers' first varsity team was fielded in 1938, where the Knights competed as an independent team. Rutgers remained unaffiliated with any formal athletic conference and was considered an independent until joining the Atlantic 10 Conference as an associate soccer member in the mid-1980s. The Knights Big East Conference for soccer in 1995. On July 1, 2014, Rutgers became a member of the Big Ten athletic conference, after paying an $11.5 million exit fee to the American Athletic Conference (which formed as a result of the splitting of the Big East Conference).

== Players ==
=== Current roster ===
As of September 2025

Note: Flags indicate national team as defined under FIFA eligibility rules; some limited exceptions apply. Players may hold more than one non-FIFA nationality.

No.	Pos.	Nation	Player
0	GK	USA	Graham Kois
1	GK	USA	Ciaran Dalton
2	DF	USA	Braxton Montgomery
3	DF	USA	Devon Stopek
4	DF	USA	Nick Collins
5	DF	ISL	Arnar Adalsteinsson
6	MF	UGA	Pius Ssebulime
7	MF	NED	Timo Jansen
8	MF	USA	Cole Cruthers
9	FW	USA	Andrew Kitch
10	MF	GER	Joschi Schelb
11	FW	GER	Dan Karsten
12	MF	USA	Lenny Aviles
13	MF	USA	Thomas Angelone
14	FW	GHA	Jude Essuman
15	DF	USA	Simon Gorczowski

No.	Pos.	Nation	Player
16	MF	USA	Dylan Carlson
17	DF	CAY	Jaeden Gordon
18	MF	USA	Joshua Jerome
19	FW	USA	Amer Lukovic
20	MF	FRA	Camron Boumsong
21	MF	USA	Nestor Cabrera
22	MF	USA	Francesco Di Ponzio
23	DF	USA	Jeffrey Bryjak
24	FW	USA	Matty Lynch
25	DF	USA	Cedric Lemaire
26	DF	USA	Erick Ruiz
28	DF	USA	Jack Andrus
31	GK	USA	Logan Brown
32	GK	TRI	Ailan Panton
44	DF	USA	Sawyer Koza

=== All-Americans ===
Rutgers has produced ten All-Americans.

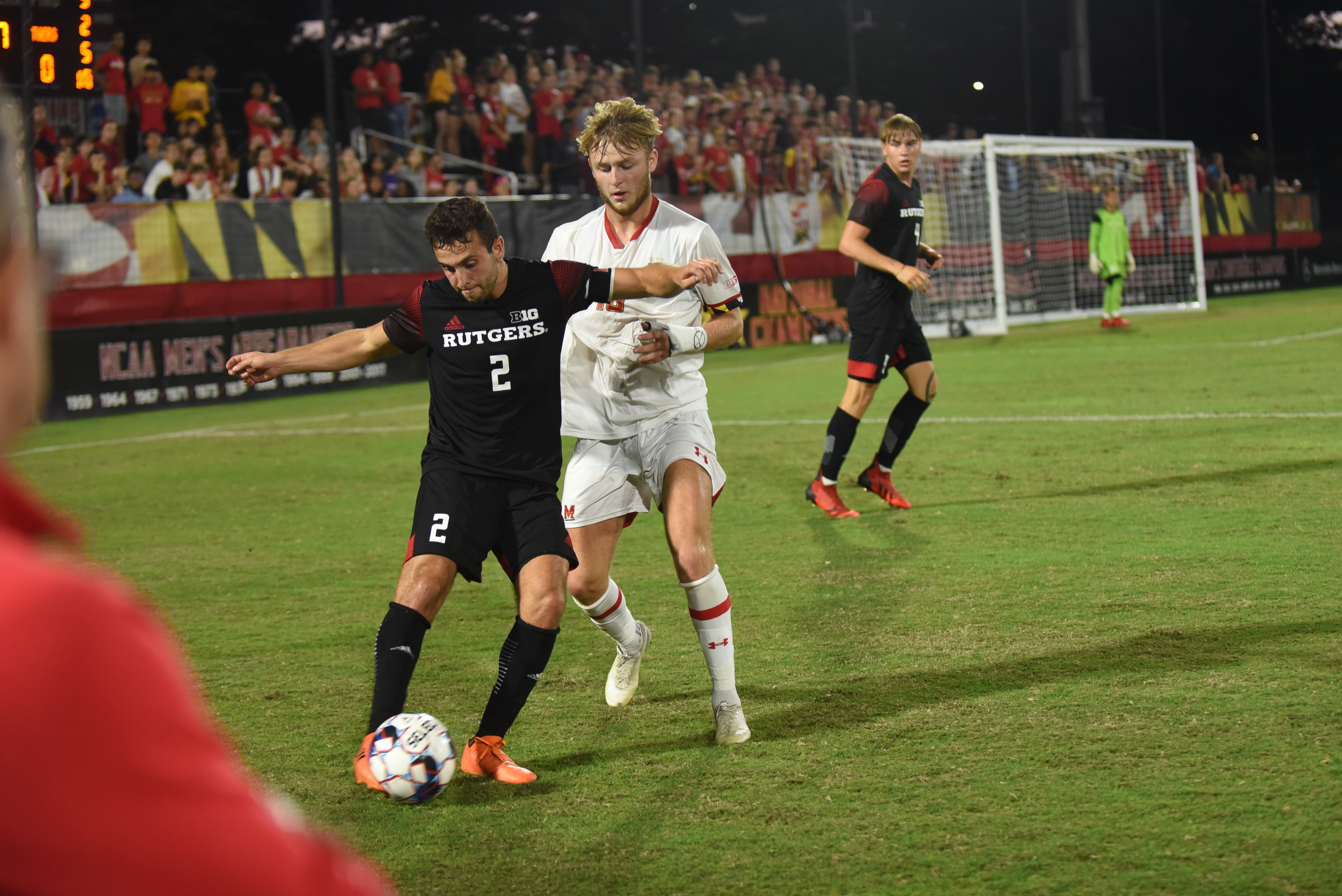
Rutgers (in black kit) v Maryland match in 2021

Player	Pos.	Year
Jon Conway	GK	1999
Alexi Lalas	D	1991
Dave Masur	MF	1983, 1984
Steve Rammel	FW	1990
Richard Schiesswohl	MF	1966
Herb Schmidt	FW	1966
Mike Shaw	MF	1996
Peter Vermes	DF	1987
Bobby Joe Esposito	FW	1986
Bill Walsh	FW	1997
Jason Wright	MF	2014

== Coaches ==
There have been six head coaches in Rutgers' history.

Years	Coach	GP	W	L	T	Pct.
1938–1970	George Dochat	278	141	116	21	.545
1971–1974	J. William Maytas	47	10	32	5	.266
1975–1980	Kalman Caspo	75	26	41	8	.400
1980*	Geza Kiss	4	2	1	1	.625
1981–2009	Bob Reasso	606	351	184	71	.638
2010–2018	Dan Donigan	112	46	55	11	.460
2019–present	Jim McElderry	98	41	40	17	.505

* Geza Kiss was an interim coach.

== Honours ==
- Big Ten tournament
  - Winners (1): 2022
- NCAA Division I Championship
  - Runners-up (1): 1990
