= 2017 Atlantic 10 Conference men's soccer season =

- League: NCAA Division I
- Sport: Soccer
- Duration: August 25, 2017 – November 12, 2017
- Teams: 12

2018 MLS SuperDraft
- Top draft pick: Rafael Andrade Santos, VCU
- Picked by: D.C. United, 74th overall

Regular Season
- Season champions: UMass
- Runners-up: VCU

Tournament
- Champions: UMass
- Runners-up: VCU
- Finals MVP: Matthew Mooney

A-10 men's soccer seasons
- ← 2016 2018 →

2017 Atlantic 10 Conference men's soccer standings
	Conf.					Overall
Team	W		L		T	W		L		T
UMass ‡	6	–	1	–	1	15	–	4	–	3
VCU +	6	–	2	–	0	13	–	7	–	0
George Washington	6	–	2	–	0	9	–	7	–	2
Dayton	6	–	2	–	0	9	–	8	–	2
No. 11 Fordham +	5	–	2	–	1	14	–	6	–	3
Rhode Island	4	–	3	–	1	10	–	6	–	3
St. Bonaventure	4	–	4	–	0	8	–	9	–	2
Saint Louis	4	–	4	–	0	7	–	9	–	1
Davidson	3	–	4	–	1	8	–	7	–	2
LaSalle	3	–	5	–	0	8	–	9	–	1
Saint Joseph's	1	–	6	–	1	3	–	11	–	4
Duquesne	1	–	7	–	0	3	–	13	–	1
George Mason	0	–	7	–	1	5	–	9	–	2
‡ – 2017 Atlantic 10 Tournament champion + – Invited to the 2017 NCAA Division I Men's Soccer Championship; As of December 13, 2017; Rankings from United Soccer Coaches

The 2017 Atlantic 10 Conference men's soccer season was the 31st season of varsity soccer in the conference. The regular season began on August 25 and concluded on November 1. The season culminated with the 2017 Atlantic 10 Men's Soccer Tournament which began on November 4 and concluded on November 12.

UMass went on to win both the regular season at tournament championships. Saint Louis entered the season as the defending regular season champions, but a dip in form, prevented them from retaining the title. Fordham were the defending tournament champions, and have qualified for the A-10 Tournament, offering them an opportunity to defend their title. The Fordham Rams were eliminated by UMass in the semifinals.

In addition to UMass; regular season and tournament runners-up, VCU, as well as Fordham qualified for the NCAA Tournament. This was the first time since 2014 that an A-10 team earned an at-large berth in the tournament. Further, this was the most teams the A-10 fielded in the NCAA Tournament since 2012, when there were four berths from the conference. In the tournament, VCU was given a second-round bye and 16 seed where they were eliminated by Butler. Massachusetts and Fordham contested in the first round. Massachusetts fell to Colgate, while Fordham ended up going on a quarterfinal run, knocking off two ACC teams. It was the furthest run by an A-10 team in the tournament since 2011, when Charlotte reached the 2011 College Cup Final.

== Preseason ==
=== Recruiting ===
National rankings
Team	CSN	TDS	Total signees
Davidson	NR	NR	4
Dayton	NR	NR	TBA
Duquesne	NR	NR	12
Fordham	NR	NR	4
George Mason	NR	NR	TBA
George Washington	NR	NR	TBA
La Salle	NR	NR	TBA
UMass	NR	#55	3
Rhode Island	NR	NR	8
St. Bonaventure	NR	NR	3
Saint Joseph's	NR	NR	TBA
Saint Louis	NR	#18	8
VCU	NR	#15	9

=== Preseason poll ===
The preseason poll was released on August 24, 2017. Fordham was voted to repeat as A-10 champions, with Saint Louis and VCU being close second and thirds.

	Team ranking	First-place votes	Raw points
1.	Fordham	8	162
2.	Saint Louis	2	153
3.	VCU	3	147
4.	Dayton	0	122
5.	Rhode Island	0	105
6.	George Washington	0	94
7.	Duquesne	0	90
8.	UMass	0	72
9.	La Salle	0	70
10.	Davidson	0	57
11.	George Mason	0	43
12.	Saint Joseph's	0	35
13.	St. Bonaventure	0	33

== Regular season ==
Index to colors and formatting
A10 member won
A10 member lost
A10 member tied
A10 teams in **bold**

All times Eastern time.† denotes Homecoming game

=== Week 1 (Aug 21-27) ===
Schedule and results:

Date	Time (ET)	Visiting team	Home team	Site	TV	Result	Attendance
August 25	1:00 p.m.	**Duquesne**	Saint Francis (PA)	Stokes Soccerplex • Loretto, PA	A10N	**L** 2–4	200
August 25	4:00 p.m.	St. Francis Brooklyn	**UMass**	Rudd Field • Amherst, MA		**W** 2–1	326
August 25	5:00 p.m.	**Fordham**	Elon	Koskinen Stadium • Durham, NC; John Rennie Nike Invitational		**T** 0–0 ^{2OT}	0
August 25	6:00 p.m.	East Tennessee State	**Dayton**	Baujan Field • Dayton, OH		**T** 1–1 ^{2OT}	1,152
August 25	7:00 p.m.	No. 19 Coastal Carolina	**George Mason**	George Mason Stadium • Fairfax, VA		**W** 2–1	394
August 25	7:00 p.m.	**George Washington**	Binghamton	Bearcats Sports Complex • Binghamton, NY	Stadium	**L** 0–4	928
August 25	7:00 p.m.	Loyola (MD)	**La Salle**	McCarthy Stadium • Philadelphia, PA		**L** 4–5 ^{OT}	65
August 25	7:00 p.m.	Boston University	**Rhode Island**	URI Soccer Complex • Kingston, RI	A10N	**W** 3–0	318
August 25	7:00 p.m.	**St. Bonaventure**	Bucknell	Emmitt Field • Lewisburg, PA		**W** 1–0 ^{OT}	885
August 25	7:30 p.m.	Temple	**St. Joseph's**	Sweeney Field • Philadelphia, PA		**W** 3–1	1,874
August 25	7:30 p.m.	Oakland	**VCU**	Sports Backers Stadium • Richmond, VA	A10N	**L** 2–3	566
August 25	8:30 p.m.	No. 8 Syracuse	**Saint Louis**	Hermann Stadium • St. Louis, MO		**L** 1–2 ^{OT}	2,348
August 26	6:00 p.m.	Presbyterian	**Davidson**	Alumni Soccer Stadium • Davidson, NC		**W** 2–1	767
August 27	12:00 p.m.	Bloomsburg	**Duquesne**	Rooney Field • Pittsburgh, PA	A10N	**W** 5–0	208
August 27	2:30 p.m.	**Fordham**	Duke	Koskinen Stadium • Durham, NC; John Rennie Nike Invitational		**L** 0–3	582
August 27	3:00 p.m.	**St. Bonaventure**	Robert Morris	North Athletic Complex • Moon Township, PA	A10N	**W** 3–2 ^{2OT}	612
August 27	3:30 p.m.	Sacred Heart	**UMass**	Rudd Field • Amherst, MA		**W** 3–0	362
August 27	4:00 p.m.	**Dayton**	Fort Wayne	Hefner Soccer Complex • Fort Wayne, IN		**L** 1–2	188
August 27	4:00 p.m.	**George Washington**	Lehigh	Ulrich Sports Complex • Bethlehem, PA	PLTV	**W** 1–0	209
August 25	7:00 p.m.	American	**George Mason**	George Mason Stadium • Fairfax, VA; D.C. College Cup		**W** 3–0	542
August 27	7:00 p.m.	No. 22 Michigan State	**Saint Louis**	Hermann Stadium • St. Louis, MO		**L** 0–2	1,261
August 27	7:00 p.m.	Appalachian State	**VCU**	Sports Backers Stadium • Richmond, VA		**L** 2–3	415

Players of the week:

Offensive		Defensive		Rookie	
Player	Team	Player	Team	Player	Team
Matt Crawford; Paul Afful	Saint Joseph's; St. Bonaventure	Corey Chambers	George Mason	Corey Chambers	George Mason
Reference: Atlantic 10 Conference

=== Week 2 (Aug 28-Sep 3) ===
Schedule and results:

Date	Time (ET)	Visiting team	Home team	Site	TV	Result	Attendance
August 28	7:00 p.m.	**Rhode Island**	Albany	Bob Ford Field • Albany, NY		**L** 0–4	2,112
August 29	7:00 p.m.	Hartford	**Saint Joseph's**	Sweeney Field • Philadelphia, PA		**T** 1–1	53
August 31	7:00 p.m.	Marshall	**Duquesne**	Rooney Field • Pittsburgh, PA	A10N+	**L** 1–3	310
September 1	4:00 p.m.	**La Salle**	DePaul	Cacciatore Stadium • Chicago, IL		**L** 1–2	236
September 1	4:00 p.m.	Columbia	**UMass**	Rudd Field • Amherst, MA		**T** 1–1 ^{2OT}	345
September 1	6:00 p.m.	Western Illinois	**Dayton**	Baujan Field • Dayton, OH		**W** 4–1	271
September 1	7:00 p.m.	Radford	**Davidson**	Alumni Soccer Stadium • Davidson, NC		**W** 1–0	384
September 1	7:00 p.m.	**George Mason**	Albany	Bob Ford Field • Albany, NY		**L** 1–3	760
September 1	7:00 p.m.	**George Washington**	St. Francis Brooklyn	Brooklyn Bridge Park • Brooklyn, NY	NEC Front Row	**L** 1–2	225
September 1	7:00 p.m.	**St. Bonaventure**	UTRGV	UTRGV Soccer and Track & Field Complex • Edinburg, TX; Rio Grande Valley Invitational		**T** 1–1 ^{2OT}	754
September 1	7:00 p.m.	Iona	**VCU**	Sports Backers Stadium • Richmond, VA		**Cancelled**^{[a]}	
September 1	7:30 p.m.	**Fordham**	St. John's	Belson Stadium • Queens, NY		**W** 1–0	1,330
September 2	2:00 p.m.	**St. Joseph's**	Quinnipiac	QU Soccer Field • Hamden, CT		**L** 0–1	1,047
September 2	7:00 p.m.	No. 2 Wake Forest	**Saint Louis**	Hermann Stadium • St. Louis, MO		**L** 1–4	919
September 3	12:00 p.m.	**St. Bonaventure**	Houston Baptist	UTRGV Soccer and Track & Field Complex • Edinburg, TX; Rio Grande Valley Invitational		**L** 1–2 ^{2OT}	93
September 3	1:00 p.m.	**Dayton**	Belmont	E. S. Rose Park • Nashville, TN		**T** 0–0 ^{2OT}	394
September 3	1:00 p.m.	**George Mason**	Siena	Siena Turf Field • Loudonville, NY		**T** 2–2 ^{2OT}	347
September 3	1:00 p.m.	**La Salle**	Loyola Chicago	Loyola Soccer Park • Chicago, IL		**L** 1–3	211
September 3	7:00 p.m.	Providence	**Rhode Island**	URI Soccer Complex • Kingston, RI	A10N	**L** 1–2 ^{OT}	2,289
September 3	7:00 p.m.	Saint Francis (PA)	**VCU**	Sports Backers Stadium • Richmond, VA		**W** 3–2	352

Players of the week:

Offensive		Defensive		Rookie	
Player	Team	Player	Team	Player	Team
Janos Loebe; Rafael Santos	Fordham; VCU	Sam Bissett	Davidson	Thor Helgason	Dayton
Reference: Atlantic 10 Conference

=== Week 3 (Sep 4-10) ===
Schedule and results:

Date	Time (ET)	Visiting team	Home team	Site	TV	Result	Attendance
September 4	4:00 p.m.	Columbia	Fordham	Coffey Field • The Bronx, NY		**L** 0–1	389
September 5	2:00 p.m.	William & Mary	**George Washington**	Mount Vernon Athletic Complex • Washington, DC	CSTV	**L** 1–2	242
September 5	7:00 p.m.	**UMass**	No. 24 New Hampshire	Bremner Field • Durham, NH		**L** 0–3	472
September 6	7:00 p.m.	**Davidson**	UNC Asheville	Greenwood Soccer Field • Asheville, NC		**W** 3–2	229
September 6	7:00 p.m.	Manhattan	**Saint Joseph's**	Sweeney Field • Philadelphia, PA	HAA	**W** 2–1 ^{OT}	71
September 7	7:00 p.m.	Bryant	**Rhode Island**	URI Soccer Complex • Kingston, RI		**W** 4–0	318
September 8	7:00 p.m.	Central Arkansas	**Dayton**	Baujan Field • Dayton, OH; Dayton Tournament		**W** 2–1	847
September 8	7:00 p.m.	**Fordham**	Lafayette	Oaks Stadium • Easton, PA		**W** 4–0	437
September 8	7:00 p.m.	Canisius	**St. Bonaventure**	Marra Athletics Complex • St. Bonaventure, NY; Franciscan Cup		**L** 0–2	378
September 8	7:30 p.m.	Binghamton	**George Mason**	George Mason Stadium • Fairfax, VA		**W** 4–3	967
September 9	12:00 p.m.	**Saint Joseph's**	VMI	Patchin Field • Lexington, VA		**T** 0–0 ^{2OT}	100
September 9	1:00 p.m.	Boston University	**UMass**	Rudd Field • Amherst, MA		**W** 1–0	407
September 9	4:00 p.m.	**Duquesne**	Bucknell	Emmitt Field • Lewisburg, PA		**L** 0–2	272
September 9	6:00 p.m.	Winthrop	**Davidson**	Alumni Soccer Stadium • Davidson, NC		**W** 2–1	572
September 9	7:00 p.m.	**La Salle**	Rider	Ben Cohen Field • Lawrenceville, NJ		**L** 1–2	541
September 9	8:00 p.m.	**Saint Louis**	Marquette	Valley Fields • Milwaukee, WI		**W** 1–0	909
September 10	1:00 p.m.	Albany	**St. Bonaventure**	Marra Athletics Complex • St. Bonaventure, NY		**W** 1–0	217
September 10	2:00 p.m.	Liberty	**Dayton**	Baujan Field • Dayton, OH; Dayton Tournament	Spectrum	**L** 0–1	545
September 10	4:00 p.m.	Marist	**Rhode Island**	URI Soccer Complex • Kingston, RI		**W** 3–0	314
September 10	7:00 p.m.	**VCU**	Florida Gulf Coast	FGCU Soccer Complex • Fort Myers, FL		**Cancelled**^{[b]}	

Players of the week:

Offensive		Defensive		Rookie	
Player	Team	Player	Team	Player	Team
Ryan Mingachos	George Mason	Nils Leifhelm	Rhode Island	Daniel Morales; Patrick Wilkinson	Saint Joseph's; Saint Louis
Reference: Atlantic 10 Conference

=== Week 4 (Sep 11-17) ===
Schedule and results:

Date	Time (ET)	Visiting team	Home team	Site	TV	Result	Attendance
September 12	4:00 p.m.	**Saint Joseph's**	Sacred Heart	Campus Field • Fairfield, CT		**L** 1–2 ^{OT}	120
September 12	7:00 p.m.	High Point	**Davidson**	Alumni Soccer Stadium • Davidson, NC		**T** 1–1 ^{2OT}	411
September 12	7:00 p.m.	**UMass**	Dartmouth	Burnham Field • Hanover, NH		**L** 0–1	974
September 13	7:00 p.m.	**Dayton**	Northern Kentucky	NKU Soccer Stadium • Highland Heights, KY		**L** 0–1	101
September 13	7:00 p.m.	**George Washington**	Navy	Glenn Warner Soccer Facility • Annapolis, MD	Stadium	**W** 3–1	204
September 15	7:00 p.m.	Wofford	**Davidson**	Alumni Soccer Stadium • Davidson, NC		**W** 3–0	407
September 16	1:00 p.m.	Colgate	**UMass**	Rudd Field • Amherst, MA		**W** 2–1	506
September 16	2:00 p.m.	**Fordham**	Quinnipiac	QU Soccer Stadium • Hamden, CT		**W** 1–0	734
September 16	7:00 p.m.	Navy	**Duquesne**	Rooney Field • Pittsburgh, PA	A10+	**W** 2–1	302
September 16	7:00 p.m.	West Virginia	**George Mason**	George Mason Stadium • Fairfax, VA		**L** 2–3 ^{OT}	376
September 16	7:00 p.m.	UMBC	**George Washington**	Mount Vernon Athletic Field • Washington, DC		**T** 1–1 ^{2OT}	314
September 17	7:00 p.m.	Lafayette	**La Salle**	McCarthy Stadium • Philadelphia, PA		**W** 2–1	250
September 17	7:00 p.m.	**Rhode Island**	No. 16 New Hampshire	Bremner Field • Durham, NH		**T** 0–0 ^{2OT}	1,731
September 17	7:00 p.m.	Hartwick	**St. Bonaventure**	Marra Athletics Complex • St. Bonaventure, NY		**L** 1–3	125
September 17	8:00 p.m.	No. 25 Akron	**Saint Louis**	Hermann Stadium • St. Louis, MO		**T** 0–0 ^{2OT}	601
September 17	1:00 p.m.	**Dayton**	No. 12 Western Michigan	WMU Soccer Complex • Kalamazoo, MI		**L** 0–1	500

Players of the week:

Offensive		Defensive		Rookie	
Player	Team	Player	Team	Player	Team
Janos Loebe	Fordham	Rashid Nuhu; Nils Leifhelm	Fordham; Rhode Island	Oscar Brown	George Washington
Reference: Atlantic 10 Conference

=== Week 5 (Sep 18-24) ===
Schedule and results:

Date	Time (ET)	Visiting team	Home team	Site	TV	Result	Attendance
September 19	7:00 p.m.	**Davidson**	Virginia Tech	Thompson Field • Blacksburg, VA	ACCN+	**L** 1–2	412
September 19	3:00 p.m.	**Duquesne**	Temple	Temple Sports Complex • Philadelphia, PA		**L** 1–4	265
September 19	7:00 p.m.	**George Washington**	No. 7 North Carolina	Fetzer Field • Cary, NC	ESPN3	**L** 1–4	418
September 19	7:00 p.m.	**UMass**	Central Connecticut	Central Connecticut Soccer Field • New Britain, CT		**T** 1–1 ^{2OT}	233
September 19	7:00 p.m.	**VCU**	Old Dominion	ODU Soccer Complex • Norfolk, VA; Rivalry	A10N+	**L** 0–1	0
September 19	7:00 p.m.	**Saint Joseph's**	Villanova	Higgins Soccer Complex • Philadelphia, PA; City 6		**L** 0–3	257
September 20	7:00 p.m.	Oakland	**Dayton**	Baujan Field • Dayton, OH	UDTV	**W** 6–2	202
September 20	7:00 p.m.	Manhattan	**Fordham**	Coffey Stadium • The Bronx, NY	A10N	**W** 3–0	214
September 20	7:00 p.m.	East Tennessee State	**George Mason**	George Mason Stadium • Fairfax, VA		**W** 3–1	124
September 20	7:00 p.m.	Penn	**La Salle**	McCarthy Stadium • Philadelphia, PA		**W** 3–0	165
September 20	7:00 p.m.	**St. Bonaventure**	Niagara	Niagara Field • Lewiston, NY		**T** 1–1 ^{2OT}	287
September 23	1:00 p.m.	Bryant	**Fordham**	Coffey Stadium • The Bronx, NY		**W** 1–0	345
September 23	1:00 p.m.	Hartford	**UMass**	Rudd Field • Amherst, MA		**W** 3–0	461
September 23	2:00 p.m.	NJIT	**George Washington**	Mount Vernon Athletic Field • Washington, DC		**W** 1–0	338
September 23	2:00 p.m.	No. 5 Stanford	**Saint Louis**	Hermann Stadium • St. Louis, MO		**W** 2–0	3,326
September 23	7:00 p.m.	**Dayton**	West Virginia	Dlesk Stadium • Morgantown, WV		**L** 0–1	1,008
September 23	7:00 p.m.	**George Mason**	Longwood	Longwood Athletics Complex • Farmville, VA		**W** 2–0	212
September 23	7:00 p.m.	Hartwick	**La Salle**	McCarthy Stadium • Philadelphia, PA		**W** 2–1	250
September 23	7:00 p.m.	**Rhode Island**	No. 25 Brown	Stevenson-Pincince Field • Providence, RI		**T** 0–0 ^{2OT}	468
September 23	7:00 p.m.	Yale	Saint Joseph's	Sweeney Field • Philadelphia, PA	A10N+	**L** 0–1	2,450
September 24	1:00 p.m.	**Duquesne**	Robert Morris	Minton Soccer Field • Moon Township, PA		**T** 1–1 ^{2OT}	127
September 24	2:00 p.m.	**St. Bonaventure**	Marist	Leonidoff Field • Poughkeepsie, NY		**L** 1–3	127
September 24	7:00 p.m.	**VCU**	Coastal Carolina	CCU Soccer Field • Conway, SC	BSNTV	**W** 1–0	130

Players of the week:

Offensive		Defensive		Rookie	
Player	Team	Player	Team	Player	Team
Leo Novaes	Saint Louis	Rashid Nuhu; Nils Leifhelm	Fordham; Rhode Island	Brady O'Connor; Spencer Jones	George Washington; Saint Louis
Reference: Atlantic 10 Conference

=== Week 6 (Sep 25-Oct 1) ===
Schedule and results:

Date	Time (ET)	Visiting team	Home team	Site	TV	Result	Attendance
September 25	6:00 p.m.	**Davidson**	No. 9 Virginia	Klöckner Stadium • Charlottesville, VA	ESPN3	**L** 1–2	1,056
September 26	5:00 p.m.	**Rhode Island**	Boston College	Newton Soccer Complex • Newton, MA		**W** 2–1	372
September 26	7:00 p.m.	**George Washington**	Stony Brook	Kenneth P. LaValle Stadium • Brookhaven, NY	Wolfievision	**T** 1–1 ^{2OT}	672
September 27	7:00 p.m.	**Duquesne**	Bowling Green	Cochrane Soccer Stadium • Bowling Green, OH		**L** 0–1 ^{2OT}	773
September 27	7:00 p.m.	LIU Brooklyn	**La Salle**	McCarthy Stadium • Philadelphia, PA		**T** 1–1 ^{2OT}	375
September 30	3:00 p.m.	**La Salle**	**Duquesne**	Rooney Field • Pittsburgh, PA		**DUQ** 3–1	207
September 30	3:00 p.m.	**St. Bonaventure**	Saint Francis (PA)	Stokes SoccerPlex • Loretto, PA		**W** 1–0	0
September 30	6:00 p.m.	**Dayton**	**Davidson**	Alumni Soccer Stadium • Davidson, NC		**DAY** 2–1	1,264
September 30	7:00 p.m.	**George Washington**	**Rhode Island**	URI Soccer Complex • Kingston, RI		**URI** 2–1	418
September 30	7:00 p.m.	**Fordham**	**George Mason**	George Mason Stadium • Fairfax, VA		**T** 1–1 ^{2OT}	831
September 30	7:00 p.m.	**VCU**	No. 15 UNC Wilmington	Legion Field • Wilmington, NC	CAAtv	**W** 1–0 ^{OT}	130
September 30	8:00 p.m.	**UMass**	**Saint Louis**	Hermann Stadium • St. Louis, MO		**MASS** 3–1	461

Players of the week:

Offensive		Defensive		Rookie	
Player	Team	Player	Team	Player	Team
Chae Brangman	Rhode Island	Mario Sequeira	VCU	Davis Smith	UMass
Reference: Atlantic 10 Conference

=== Week 7 (Oct 2-8) ===
Schedule and results:

Date	Time (ET)	Visiting team	Home team	Site	TV	Result	Attendance
October 3	4:00 p.m.	Vermont	UMass	Rudd Field • Amherst, MA		**W** 2–1	247
October 4	2:00 p.m.	**George Mason**	George Washington	Sports Backers Stadium • Richmond, VA; Revolutionary Rivalry/D.C. College Cup	MASN+	**GWU** 1–0	263
October 4	7:00 p.m.	**Davidson**	VCU	Sports Backers Stadium • Richmond, VA	A10N	**VCU** 4–1	479
October 4	7:00 p.m.	**Saint Joseph's**	Dayton	Baujan Field • Dayton, OH	Spectrum	**DAY** 3–2	248
October 4	7:00 p.m.	**Saint Louis**	Duquesne	Rooney Field • Pittsburgh, PA	A10N+	**SLU** 3–0	187
October 4	7:00 p.m.	**La Salle**	Fordham	Coffey Field • The Bronx, NY		**FOR** 1–0	285
October 4	7:00 p.m.	**St. Bonaventure**	Rhode Island	URI Soccer Complex • Kingston, RI		**URI** 3–2	1,309
October 7	12:00 p.m.	**Duquesne**	UMass	Rudd Field • Amherst, MA		**MASS** 5–0	507
October 7	2:00 p.m.	**Dayton**	George Washington	Mount Vernon Athletic Complex • Washington, DC		**GWU** 2–0	335
October 7	3:00 p.m.	**Davidson**	St. Bonaventure	Marra Athletics Complex • St. Bonaventure, NY		**DAV** 1–0	0
October 7	7:00 p.m.	**VCU**	Fordham	Coffey Field • The Bronx, NY		**VCU** 1–0	211
October 7	7:00 p.m.	**Rhode Island**	La Salle	McCarthy Stadium • Philadelphia, PA		**URI** 1–0	450
October 7	7:00 p.m.	**George Mason**	Saint Joseph's	Sweeney Field • Philadelphia, PA		**SJU** 2–0	1,780

Players of the week:

Offensive		Defensive		Rookie	
Player	Team	Player	Team	Player	Team
Stavros Zarokostas	Rhode Island	Reese Moore	George Washington	Davis Smith	UMass
Reference: Atlantic 10 Conference

=== Week 8 (Oct 9-15) ===
Schedule and results:

Date	Time (ET)	Visiting team	Home team	Site	TV	Result	Attendance
October 10	5:00 p.m.	Rhode Island	Holy Cross	Linda Johnson Smith Stadium • Worcester, MA		**W** 2–0	102
October 11	7:00 p.m.	Duquesne	**Davidson**	Alumni Soccer Stadium • Davidson, NC			
October 11	7:00 p.m.	Fordham	**St. Bonaventure**	Marra Sports Complex • St. Bonaventure, NY		**FOR** 2–0	54
October 11	7:00 p.m.	George Washington	**La Salle**	McCarthy Stadium • Philadelphia, PA		**LAS** 5–3	207
October 11	7:00 p.m.	UMass	**Saint Joseph's**	Sweeney Field • Philadelphia, PA		**T** 2–2	154
October 11	7:00 p.m.	Saint Louis	**VCU**	Sports Backers Stadium • Richmond, VA	A10N	**VCU** 4–0	606
October 14	1:00 p.m.	La Salle	**UMass**	Rudd Field • Amherst, MA		**MASS** 2–0	614
October 14	6:00 p.m.	Rhode Island	**Davidson**	Alumni Soccer Stadium • Davidson, NC			
October 14	7:00 p.m.	St. Bonaventure	**Dayton**	Alumni Soccer Stadium • Davidson, NC	Spectrum	**DAY** 6–1	263
October 14	7:00 p.m.	Saint Joseph's	**Fordham**	Coffey Stadium • The Bronx, NY		**FOR** 1–0	264
October 14	7:00 p.m.	Saint Louis	**George Mason**	George Mason Stadium • Fairfax, VA		**SLU** 3–2	685
October 14	7:00 p.m.	George Washington	**VCU**	Sports Backers Stadium • Richmond, VA	A10N	**GWU** 2–1	516

Players of the week:

Offensive		Defensive		Rookie	
Player	Team	Player	Team	Player	Team
Dominik Richter	Rhode Island	Rashid Nuhu	Fordham	Jacob Bohm	Fordham
Reference: Atlantic 10 Conference

=== Week 9 (Oct 16-22) ===
Schedule and results:

Date	Time (ET)	Visiting team	Home team	Site	TV	Result	Attendance
October 18	3:00 p.m.	Rhode Island	UMass	Rudd Field • Amherst, MA		**MASS** 2–1	255
October 18	7:00 p.m.	St. Bonaventure	Duquesne	Rooney Field • Pittsburgh, PA	A10N	**SBU** 1–0 ^{2OT}	165
October 18	2:00 p.m.	Davidson	George Washington	Mount Vernon Athletic Field • Washington, DC		**GWU** 2–0	306
October 18	7:00 p.m.	VCU	George Mason	George Mason Stadium • Fairfax, VA; Rivalry	A10N	**VCU** 4–0	385
October 18	7:00 p.m.	Saint Joseph's	La Salle	McCarthy Stadium • Philadelphia, PA; City 6	WCAU+	**LAS** 4–2	268
October 18	8:00 p.m.	Dayton	Saint Louis	Hermann Stadium • St. Louis, MO		**DAY** 4–0	373
October 21	2:00 p.m.	Duquesne	George Washington	Mount Vernon Athletic Field • Washington, DC		**GWU** 1–0	464
October 21	5:00 p.m.	George Mason	St. Bonaventure	Marra Athletics Complex • Olean, NY		**SBU** 1–0	206
October 21	7:00 p.m.	UMass	Dayton	Baujan Field • Dayton, OH		**MASS** 3–2	361
October 21	7:00 p.m.	Fordham	Rhode Island	URI Soccer Complex • Kingston, RI		**FOR** 2–0	1,000
October 21	7:00 p.m.	VCU	Saint Joseph's	McCarthy Stadium • Philadelphia, PA		**VCU** 3–0	1,280
October 21	7:00 p.m.	Davidson	Saint Louis	Hermann Stadium • St. Louis, MO		**DAV** 1–0	306

Players of the week:

Offensive		Defensive		Rookie	
Player	Team	Player	Team	Player	Team
Rok Taneski	Dayton	Thor Arne Höfs	George Washington	Hugh Chatham	Davidson
Reference: Atlantic 10 Conference

=== Week 10 (Oct 23-29) ===
Schedule and results:

Date	Time (ET)	Visiting team	Home team	Site	TV	Result	Attendance
October 24	7:00 p.m.	Elon	**Davidson**	Alumni Soccer Stadium • Davidson, NC			
October 24	7:00 p.m.	**La Salle**	Drexel	Vidas Field • Philadelphia, PA; City 6		**W** 1–0	355
October 24	7:00 p.m.	**VCU**	No. 9 Maryland	Ludwig Field • College Park, MD	BTN+	**W** 3–0	820
October 28	7:00 p.m.	**Duquesne**	**Dayton**	Rooney Field • Pittsburgh, PA	A10N+	**DAY** 1–0	113
October 28	7:00 p.m.	**Saint Louis**	**Fordham**	Coffey Field • The Bronx, NY	A10N	**SLU** 2–1	312
October 28	7:00 p.m.	No. 25 **UMass**	**George Mason**	George Mason Stadium • Fairfax, VA		**UMASS** 4–1	479
October 28	7:00 p.m.	**George Washington**	**Saint Joseph's**	Sweeney Field • Philadelphia, PA	A10N	**GWU** 3–1	870
October 28	7:00 p.m.	**St. Bonaventure**	**La Salle**	McCarthy Stadium • Philadelphia, PA		**SBU** 2–1	500
October 28	7:00 p.m.	**Rhode Island**	**VCU**	Sports Backers Stadium • Richmond, VA	A10N	**VCU** 2–1	726

Players of the week:

Offensive		Defensive		Rookie	
Player	Team	Player	Team	Player	Team
Rafael Santos	VCU	Mario Sequeira	VCU	Mario Sequeira	VCU
Reference: Atlantic 10 Conference

=== Week 11 (Oct 30-Nov 5) ===
Schedule and results:

Date	Time (ET)	Visiting team	Home team	Site	TV	Result	Attendance
November 1	2:00 p.m.	**Fordham**	No. 25 **UMass**	Rudd Field • Amherst, MA	A10N	**FOR** 3–2	463
November 1	7:00 p.m.	**La Salle**	**Davidson**	Alumni Soccer Stadium • Davidson, NC		**LAS** 2–0	624
November 1	7:00 p.m.	**George Mason**	**Dayton**	Baujan Field • Dayton, OH	Spectrum		
November 1	7:00 p.m.	**Duquesne**	**Rhode Island**	URI Soccer Complex • Kingston, RI		**URI** 2–1	519
November 1	7:00 p.m.	No. 22 **VCU**	**St. Bonaventure**	Marra Athletics Complex • St. Bonaventure, NY	A10N	**SBU** 2–1	210

Players of the week:

Offensive		Defensive		Rookie	
Player	Team	Player	Team	Player	Team
Rok Taneski	Dayton	Rashid Nuhu	Fordham	Nicola Bonso	St. Bonaventure
Reference: Atlantic 10 Conference

== Rankings ==
=== United Soccer Coaches National ===
Legend
Increase in ranking
Decrease in ranking
Not ranked previous week

		Pre	Wk 1	Wk 2	Wk 3	Wk 4	Wk 5	Wk 6	Wk 7	Wk 8	Wk 9	Wk 10	Wk 11	Wk 12	Final
Davidson	C														
Dayton	C														
Duquesne	C														
Fordham	C												RV	RV	11
George Mason	C		RV	NR											
George Washington	C														
La Salle	C														
UMass	C									RV	25	25	RV	24	NR
Rhode Island	C									RV					
Saint Louis	C														
St. Joseph's	C														
St. Bonaventure	C														
VCU	C								RV	RV	RV	22	24	22	RV

=== United Soccer Coaches Midwest Regional ===
Legend
Increase in ranking
Decrease in ranking
Not ranked previous week

		Wk 1	Wk 2	Wk 3	Wk 4	Wk 5	Wk 6	Wk 7	Wk 8	Wk 9	Wk 10	Wk 11	Wk 12
Davidson	C			9	7	9	NR						
Dayton	C												
Duquesne	C												
Fordham	C					8	7	NR		9	10	7	8
George Mason	C	7	NR										
George Washington	C												
La Salle	C												
UMass	C		9	10	NR		9	8	7	5	5	8	5
Rhode Island	C	10	NR					10	10	NR		10	NR
Saint Louis	C												
St. Joseph's	C												
St. Bonaventure	C												
VCU	C							9	9	7	4	4	7

== Postseason ==
=== Atlantic 10 Tournament ===
Quarterfinals; November 4–5
1	UMass	1
8	Saint Louis	0
4	Dayton	2
5	Fordham	3
2	VCU	4
7	St. Bonaventure	1
3	George Washington	0
6	Rhode Island	1

Semifinals; Friday, November 10
1	UMass (OT)	1
5	Fordham	0
2	VCU	2
6	Rhode Island	0

Championship; Sunday, November 12
1	UMass	3
2	VCU	1

=== NCAA Tournament ===
Seed	Region	School	1st Round	2nd Round	3rd Round	Quarterfinals	Semifinals	Championship
16	1	VCU	BYE	L 2–3 vs. Butler – (Richmond)				
—	3	Fordham	W 3–2 ^{OT} vs. St. Francis Brooklyn – (The Bronx)	W 1–0 vs. #11 Virginia – (Charlottesville)	T, 2–2 ^{W, 9–8 PK} vs. #6 Duke – (Durham)	L 1–2 vs. #3 North Carolina – (Cary)		
—	2	UMass	L 0–2 vs. Colgate – (Amherst)					

== Awards ==
=== Postseason awards ===
==== All A-10 awards and teams ====
2017 A10 Men's Soccer Individual Awards
Award	Recipient(s)
Offensive Player of the Year	Rafael Andrade Santos, VCU
Coach of the Year	Fran O'Leary, UMass
Midfielder of the Year	Rok Taneski, Dayton
Defensive Player of the Year	Matthew Lewis, UMass
Freshman of the Year	Davis Smith, UMass

2017 A10 Men's Soccer All-Conference Teams
First Team	Second Team	Rookie Team
Alvarro Navarro (DAY); Rok Taneski (DAY); Matthew Lewis (FOR); Jannick Loebe (FOR); Janos Loebe (FOR); Rashid Nuhu (FOR); Christian Lawal (GWU); Alex Desantis (UMA); Davis Smith (UMA); Lennart Hein (SLU); Rafael Andrade Santos (VCU)	James Haupt (DAY); Joergen Oland (FOR); Henning Dirks (GMU); Konrad Gorich (UMA); Brandon Merklin (UMA); Chae Brangman (URI); Peder Kristiansen (URI); Nils Leifhelm (URI); Dominik Richter (URI); Francesco Amorosino (VCU); Luc Fatton (VCU)	Jonas Fjeldberg (DAY); Thor Helgason (DAY); Jacob Bohm (FOR); Andron Kangramanyan (FOR); Oscar Brown (GWU); Jack Fulton (UMA); Davis Smith (UMA); Ritchie Barry (SJU); Nichola Bonso (SBU); Ulrik Edvarsen (VCU); Mario Sequeira (VCU)

==== All Americans ====
Three Atlantic 10 players were named All-Americans by the media.

Player	Position	Year	School	All-America Recognition(s)
Davis Smith	DF	Freshman	UMass	United Soccer Coaches Third-Team
János Löbe	FW	Senior	Fordham	CollegeSoccerNews.com Third-Team
Rafael Santos	MF	Senior	VCU	CollegeSoccerNews.com Second-Team; United Soccer Coaches Second-Team

== MLS SuperDraft ==
=== Total picks by school ===
Team	Round 1	Round 2	Round 3	Round 4	Total
Davidson	0	0	0	0	0
Dayton	0	0	0	0	0
Duquesne	0	0	0	0	0
Fordham	0	0	0	0	0
George Mason	0	0	0	0	0
George Washington	0	0	0	0	0
La Salle	0	0	0	0	0
UMass	0	0	0	0	0
Rhode Island	0	0	0	0	0
St. Bonaventure	0	0	0	0	0
Saint Joseph's	0	0	0	0	0
Saint Louis	0	0	0	0	0
VCU	0	0	0	1	1

=== List of selections ===
Round	Pick #	MLS team	Player	Position	College	Other
4	74	D.C. United	Rafael Santos	MF	VCU	

=== Notable non-draft signees ===
The following are notable players who went pro following the end of the season that were not selected in the 2018 MLS SuperDraft.

Player	Position	College	Moving to	Acquired	Ref.
(Ghana) Koby Osei-Wusu	MF	George Washington	(United States) Richmond Kickers	Free transfer	

== See also ==
- 2017 NCAA Division I men's soccer season
- 2017 Atlantic 10 Men's Soccer Tournament

== Notes ==
^{^[a]}The game between Iona and VCU was cancelled due to inclement weather.
^{^[b]}The game between Florida Gulf Coast and VCU was cancelled due to inclement weather from Hurricane Irma.
