= 2017 UMass Minutemen soccer team =

American college soccer season

2017 UMass Minutemen men's soccer

Atlantic 10 Regular Season Champions Atlantic 10 Tournament Champions

NCAA Tournament, First Round
- Conference: Atlantic 10 Conference
- U. Soc. Coaches poll: No. 24
- Record: 15–4–3 (6–1–1 A-10)
- Head coach: Fran O'Leary (4th season)
- Assistant coaches: Michael Mordocco (3rd season); Fred Balbino (4th season); Ben Brewster (1st season)
- Home stadium: Rudd Field

2017 Atlantic 10 Conference men's soccer standings
	Conf.					Overall
Team	W		L		T	W		L		T
UMass ‡	6	–	1	–	1	15	–	4	–	3
VCU +	6	–	2	–	0	13	–	7	–	0
George Washington	6	–	2	–	0	9	–	7	–	2
Dayton	6	–	2	–	0	9	–	8	–	2
No. 11 Fordham +	5	–	2	–	1	14	–	6	–	3
Rhode Island	4	–	3	–	1	10	–	6	–	3
St. Bonaventure	4	–	4	–	0	8	–	9	–	2
Saint Louis	4	–	4	–	0	7	–	9	–	1
Davidson	3	–	4	–	1	8	–	7	–	2
LaSalle	3	–	5	–	0	8	–	9	–	1
Saint Joseph's	1	–	6	–	1	3	–	11	–	4
Duquesne	1	–	7	–	0	3	–	13	–	1
George Mason	0	–	7	–	1	5	–	9	–	2
‡ – 2017 Atlantic 10 Tournament champion + – Invited to the 2017 NCAA Division I Men's Soccer Championship; As of December 13, 2017; Rankings from United Soccer Coaches

The 2017 UMass Minutemen soccer team represented the University of Massachusetts Amherst during the 2017 NCAA Division I men's soccer season. It was the program's 88th season in existence, and their 31st in the Atlantic 10 Conference. The Minutemen were led by fourth-year head coach, Fran O'Leary.

The season proved to be one of the more successful seasons for the Minutemen, as they qualified for the NCAA Division I Men's Soccer Championship for the first time since 2008, and posted their first winning overall record since 2008. The Minutemen won their sixth Atlantic 10 Regular Season championship, and completed the conference double by winning their third ever Atlantic 10 Men's Soccer Tournament. It was the program's first time to win both the regular season and tournament in the same season. At the end of the regular season, UMass was ranked in the United Soccer Coaches poll at 24, making it the first time in a decade the Minutemen earned national rankings.

The Minutemen earned an automatic berth into the NCAA Tournament, where they hosted Colgate. Their spell in the NCAA Tournament was short-lived, as they fell 2–0 to the Raiders at home.

== Roster ==
Updated November 24, 2017

Note: Flags indicate national team as defined under FIFA eligibility rules; some limited exceptions apply. Players may hold more than one non-FIFA nationality.

No.	Pos.	Nation	Player
0	GK	USA	John Black
1	GK	USA	Christian Curucci
2	DF	USA	Jordan Howard
3	MF	USA	Matthew Mooney
4	DF	GER	Konrad Gorich
5	MF	ENG	Connor O'Dwyer
6	MF	USA	Davis Smith
7	FW	USA	Alex Desantis
8	DF	USA	Jared McCleary
9	FW	AUS	Jack Fulton
11	MF	USA	Jaime Rosiello
12	MF	USA	Henry Steinkamp
13	DF	USA	Casey Hamill
14	FW	GRE	Andronikos Keklikoglou

No.	Pos.	Nation	Player
15	DF	USA	Dylan Cranmer
16	DF	FRA	Clement Benhaddouche
17	FW	USA	Mike Rita
18	MF	USA	Jackson Fotter
19	DF	USA	Brandon Merklin
20	MF	USA	Stephen Ravazzoli
21	FW	USA	Kevin Boino
23	MF	GHA	Samuel Asamoah
25	MF	GHA	Richard Amoako
26	MF	USA	Christian Labeck
27	DF	USA	Eli Cronin
28	DF	USA	Ryan Saul
29	DF	USA	Luke Ryan
30	GK	USA	Bardia Asefnia

== Schedule ==
Date Time, TV	Rank^{#}	Opponent^{#}	Result	Record	Site (Attendance) City, State
Preseason
08/13/2017*; 2:00 p.m.		at Northeastern			Parsons Field; Brookline, MA
08/19/2017*; 4:00 p.m.		Assumption (MA)	W 3–0		Rudd Field; Amherst, MA
Non-conference regular season
08/25/2017*; 4:00 p.m.		St. Francis Brooklyn	W 2–1	1–0–0	Rudd Field (326); Amherst, MA
08/27/2017*; 4:00 p.m.		Sacred Heart	W 3–0	2–0–0	Rudd Field (362); Amherst, MA
09/01/2017*; 4:00 p.m.		Columbia	T 1–1 ^{2OT}	2–0–1	Rudd Field (345); Amherst, MA
09/05/2017*; 7:25 p.m.		at No. 24 New Hampshire	L 0–3	2–1–1	Wildcat Stadium (472); Durham, NH
09/09/2017*; 1:00 p.m.		Boston University	W 1–0	3–1–1	Rudd Field (407); Amherst, MA
09/12/2017*; 7:00 p.m.		at Dartmouth	L 0–1	3–2–1	Burnham Field (974); Hanover, NH
09/16/2017*; 0:00 p.m.		Colgate	W 2–1	4–2–1	Rudd Field (506); Amherst, MA
09/19/2017*; 7:00 p.m.		at Central Connecticut	T 1–1 ^{2OT}	4–2–2	CCSU Soccer Field (233); New Britain, CT
09/23/2017*; 1:00 p.m.		Hartford	W 3–0	5–2–2	Rudd Field (461); Amherst, MA
Conference regular season
09/30/2017; 8:00 p.m.		at Saint Louis	W 3–1	6–2–2 (1–0–0)	Hermann Stadium (461); St. Louis, MO
10/03/2017*; 4:00 p.m.		Vermont	W 2–1	7–2–2	Rudd Field (247); Amherst, MA
10/07/2017; 12:00 p.m.		Duquesne	W 5–0	8–2–2 (2–0–0)	Rudd Field (507); Amherst, MA
10/11/2017; 7:00 p.m.		at Saint Joseph's	T 2–2 ^{2OT}	8–2–3 (2–0–1)	Sweeney Field (154); Philadelphia, PA
10/14/2017; 1:00 p.m.		La Salle	W 2–0	9–2–3 (3–0–1)	Rudd Field (614); Amherst, MA
10/18/2017; 3:00 p.m.		Rhode Island	W 2–1 ^{OT}	10–2–3 (4–0–1)	Rudd Field (255); Amherst, MA
10/21/2017; 7:00 p.m.		at Dayton	W 3–2	11–2–3 (5–0–1)	Baujan Field (361); Dayton, OH
10/28/2017; 0:00 p.m.		at George Mason	W 4–1	12–2–3 (6–0–1)	George Mason Stadium (479); Fairfax, VA
11/01/2017; 2:00 p.m.	No. 24	Fordham	L 2–3	12–3–3 (6–1–1)	Rudd Field (463); Amherst, MA
Atlantic 10 Tournament
11/05/2017*; 0:00 p.m.	(1) No. 25	(8) Saint Louis; Quarterfinals	W 1–0	13–3–3	Rudd Field (605); Amherst, MA
11/10/2017; 0:00 p.m.	(1) No. 25	vs. (5) Fordham; Semifinals	W 1–0	14–3–3	Baujan Field (164); Dayton, OH
11/12/2017; 0:00 p.m.	(1) No. 25	vs. (2) No. 24 VCU; A10 Championship	W 3–1	15–3–3	Baujan Field (147); Dayton, OH
NCAA Tournament
11/16/2017*; 1:00 p.m.	No. 24	Colgate; First Round	L 0–2	15–4–3	Rudd Field (722); Amherst, MA
*Non-conference game. ^{#}Rankings from United Soccer Coaches. (#) Tournament seedings in parentheses.
