= 2017 VCU Rams men's soccer team =

American college soccer season

2017 VCU Rams men's soccer

NCAA Tournament, Second Round
- Conference: Atlantic 10 Conference
- TopDrawerSoccer.com: No. 25
- Record: 12–7–0 (5–2–0 A-10)
- Head coach: David Giffard (8th season)
- Assistant coaches: Brett Teach (7th season); Matt Cannady (3rd season)
- Home stadium: Sports Backers Stadium

2017 Atlantic 10 Conference men's soccer standings
	Conf.					Overall
Team	W		L		T	W		L		T
UMass ‡	6	–	1	–	1	15	–	4	–	3
VCU +	6	–	2	–	0	13	–	7	–	0
George Washington	6	–	2	–	0	9	–	7	–	2
Dayton	6	–	2	–	0	9	–	8	–	2
No. 11 Fordham +	5	–	2	–	1	14	–	6	–	3
Rhode Island	4	–	3	–	1	10	–	6	–	3
St. Bonaventure	4	–	4	–	0	8	–	9	–	2
Saint Louis	4	–	4	–	0	7	–	9	–	1
Davidson	3	–	4	–	1	8	–	7	–	2
LaSalle	3	–	5	–	0	8	–	9	–	1
Saint Joseph's	1	–	6	–	1	3	–	11	–	4
Duquesne	1	–	7	–	0	3	–	13	–	1
George Mason	0	–	7	–	1	5	–	9	–	2
‡ – 2017 Atlantic 10 Tournament champion + – Invited to the 2017 NCAA Division I Men's Soccer Championship; As of December 13, 2017; Rankings from United Soccer Coaches

The 2017 VCU Rams men's soccer team represented Virginia Commonwealth University during the 2017 NCAA Division I men's soccer season. It was the 38th season of the university fielding a program. The Rams were led by eighth-year head coach, Dave Giffard.

For the third straight season, the Rams reached the championship match of the Atlantic 10 Men's Soccer Tournament, but lost for the third straight time. The Rams fell 1-3 to UMass. Despite the loss the Rams earned an at-large berth to the NCAA Division I Men's Soccer Championship. It was the program's first NCAA Tournament berth in four years. VCU were seeded 16th, giving the program their first seeding since 2012. The Rams lost in their opening NCAA Tournament match to Butler, 2-3.

== Background ==
=== Previous season ===
The Rams team finished the 2016 season 8–9–4, 4–3–1 in A10 play to earn a berth into the 2016 Atlantic 10 Men's Soccer Tournament. They defeated UMass and Dayton to advance to the A10 Championship, where they lost to Fordham. The Rams did not earn an at-large berth into the 2016 NCAA Tournament.

== Review ==
=== Offseason ===
During the 2016-17 offseason, the Rams lost nine seniors to graduation. The most notable departure was four-year starter, Dakota Barnathan, who declared for the 2017 MLS SuperDraft. Barnathan was selected in the third round, with the 59th pick by FC Dallas. Barnathan was offered a trial with FC Dallas, and appeared in a couple preseason exhibitions with the club, but ultimately was not offered a contract. After leaving Dallas' camp, Barnathan signed on with second division, United Soccer League outfit, Swope Park Rangers, the reserve team of MLS-outfit, Sporting Kansas City. No other graduates signed professional contracts following their graduation.

In February 2017, the spring 2017 season schedule was announced, where VCU participated in several exhibition matches between March and May.

On November 13, 2017, VCU was announced as the 16th-overall seed in the 2017 NCAA Division I Men's Soccer Championship, making it the 10th time in program history the Rams qualified for the tournament.

== Transfers ==
=== Departures ===
Name	Number	Pos.	Height	Weight	Year	Hometown	Reason for departure
Dakota Barnathan	8	MF	6'2"	165	Senior (Redshirt)	Massapequa, NY	Graduated; entered the 2017 MLS SuperDraft
Kai Marshall	11	MF	6'2"	185	Senior (Redshirt)	Charlottesville, VA	Graduated
Rahim Costa-Dorsey	77	FW	6'2"	180	Senior	Alexandria, VA	Graduated
Brandon Eaton	6	MF	5'8"	165	Senior	Chesapeake, VA	Graduated
Juan Fajardo Ortiz	5	DF	5'10"	160	Senior	Coyoles Central, HON	Graduated
Jorge Herranz	20	FW	6'0"	175	Senior	Madrid, ESP	Graduated
Simond Kargbo	14	FW	5'5"	130	Senior	Mount Vernon, VA	Graduated
Jason McGlothern	31	MF	6'0"	155	Senior	Seattle, WA	Graduated

=== Incoming transfers ===
Name	Number	Pos.	Height	Weight	Year	Hometown	Notes
Siad Haji	8	FW	5'8"	150	Sophomore	Manchester, New Hampshire	Transferred from New England College.
Peter Pearson	12	MF	5'7"	155	RS Junior	Virginia Beach, Virginia	Transferred from Virginia.

=== Recruits ===
Name	Nat.	Hometown	High School	Club	Height	Weight	Commit date
Brandon Bonilla; MF	CRC	San Jose, CRC	—N/a	Belén	6'1"	165	April 14, 2017
Brandon Bonilla; MF	Recruit star rankings: TDS: CSN: ESPN:						
Ulrik Edvardsen; DF	NOR	Bergen, NOR	—N/a	Brann	6'3"	175	April 14, 2017
Ulrik Edvardsen; DF	Recruit star rankings: TDS: CSN: ESPN:						
Bruk Fekade; MF	ETH	Loudoun, VA	—N/a	Loudoun Soccer Club	5'11"	150	April 14, 2017
Bruk Fekade; MF	Recruit star rankings: TDS: CSN: ESPN:						
Jared Greene; FW	USA	Virginia Beach, Virginia	Kellam High School	Beach FC	6'2"	155	April 14, 2017
Jared Greene; FW	Recruit star rankings: TDS: CSN: ESPN:						
Jared Mazzola; GK	USA	Katonah, New York	Somers High School	FC Westchester	6'1"	175	April 14, 2017
Jared Mazzola; GK	Recruit star rankings: TDS: CSN: ESPN:						

== Roster ==
As of November 15, 2017.

Note: Flags indicate national team as defined under FIFA eligibility rules; some limited exceptions apply. Players may hold more than one non-FIFA nationality.

No.	Pos.	Nation	Player
00	GK	CRC	Mario Sequeira
0	GK	USA	Jared Mazzola
1	GK	USA	Joseph Rice
2	DF	JPN	Ryo Shimazaki
3	DF	NOR	Ulrik Edvarsen
4	DF	JAM	Zeron Sewell
5	DF	FRA	Steven Dal Molin
6	MF	USA	Lyndsey Moreland
7	MF	USA	Luc Fatton
8	FW	SOM	Siad Haji
10	MF	BRA	Rafael Andrade Santos
11	MF	ESP	Fortia Munts
12	MF	USA	Peter Pearson

No.	Pos.	Nation	Player
13	MF	USA	Travis Cooke
14	FW	USA	Jared Greene
15	DF	USA	R. J. Roberts
16	MF	JAM	Oquin Robinson
17	MF	USA	Eli Lockaby
21	MF	USA	Greg Boehme
22	MF	USA	Anthony Gonnella
23	MF	ITA	Francesco Amorosino
24	DF	USA	Austin Graham
25	MF	USA	Joseph Gonnella
28	DF	ETH	Bruk Fekade
32	DF	USA	Kelly Walters
56	GK	FRA	Pierre Gardan
77	FW	GHA	Andy Mensah

Captains in bold

== Schedule ==
Date Time, TV	Rank^{#}	Opponent^{#}	Result	Record	Site (Attendance) City, State
Spring season
03/04/2017; 7:00 am		Montreal Rush	T 1–1		Sports Backers Stadium; Richmond, VA
03/19/2017; 1:00 pm		at Richmond Kickers (USL)	W 2–1		City Stadium; Richmond, VA
03/25/2017; 10:00 am		vs. High Point	W 5–0		Thompson Field; Blacksburg, VA
03/25/2017*; 1:00 pm		at Virginia Tech	T 1–1		Thompson Field; Blacksburg, VA
04/01/2017*; 1:00 pm		vs. West Virginia; Jefferson Cup	T 2–2		Strikers Soccer Complex; Glen Allen, VA
04/08/2017*; 4:00 pm		at Radford	W 1–0		Cupp Stadium; Radford, VA
04/22/2017*; 1:00 pm		Elon	W 3–0		Sports Backers Stadium; Richmond, VA
04/22/2017*; 7:00 pm		Longwood	W 3–2		Sports Backers Stadium; Richmond, VA
Exhibitions
08/19/2017*; 7:00 pm		at Pittsburgh	W 1–0		Ambrose Urbanic Field; Pittsburgh, PA
Regular season
08/25/2017*; 7:00 pm		Oakland	L 2–3	0–1–0	Sports Backers Stadium (566); Richmond, VA
08/27/2017*; 7:00 pm		Appalachian State	L 2–3	0–2–0	Sports Backers Stadium (415); Richmond, VA
09/01/2017*; 7:00 pm		Iona	Cancelled	0–2–0	Sports Backers Stadium; Richmond, VA
09/03/2017*; 7:00 pm		Saint Francis (PA)	W 3–2	1–2–0	Sports Backers Stadium (352); Richmond, VA
09/10/2017*; 7:00 pm		Florida Gulf Coast	Cancelled	1–2–0	FGCU Soccer Complex; Fort Myers, FL
09/19/2017*; 7:00 pm		at Old Dominion; Rivalry	L 0–1	1–3–0	ODU Soccer Complex; Norfolk, VA
09/24/2017*; 7:00 pm		at Coastal Carolina	W 1–0	2–3–0	CCU Soccer Field (130); Conway, SC
09/30/2017*; 7:00 pm		at No. 15 UNC Wilmington	W 1–0 ^{OT}	3–3–0	Legion Field (130); Wilmington, NC
10/04/2017; 7:00 pm		Davidson	W 4–1	4–3–0 (1–0–0)	Sports Backers Stadium (479); Richmond, VA
10/07/2017; 7:00 pm		at Fordham	W 1–0	5–3–0 (2–0–0)	Coffey Field (211); The Bronx, NY
10/11/2017; 8:00 pm		at Saint Louis	W 4–0	6–3–0 (3–0–0)	Hermann Stadium (606); St. Louis, MO
10/14/2017; 7:00 pm		George Washington	L 1–2	6–4–0 (3–1–0)	Sports Backers Stadium (516); Richmond, VA
10/18/2017; 7:00 pm		at George Mason; Rivalry	W 4–0	7–4–0 (4–1–0)	George Mason Stadium (385); Fairfax, VA
10/21/2017; 7:00 pm		at Saint Joseph's	W 3–0	8–4–0 (5–1–0)	McCarthy Stadium (1,280); Philadelphia, PA
10/24/2017*; 7:00 pm		at No. 9 Maryland	W 3–0	9–4–0	Ludwig Field (820); College Park, MD
10/28/2017; 7:00 pm		Rhode Island	W 2–1	10–4–0 (6–1–0)	Sports Backers Stadium (726); Richmond, VA
11/02/2017; 7:00 pm	No. 22	at St. Bonaventure	L 1–2	10–5–0 (6–2–0)	Marra Athletics Complex (210); Olean, NY
Atlantic 10 Tournament
11/05/2017; 7:00 pm	(2) No. 22	at (7) St. Bonaventure; Quarterfinals	W 4–1	11–5–0	Sports Backers Stadium (274); Richmond, VA
11/10/2017; 7:30 pm	(2) No. 24	vs. (6) Rhode Island; Semifinals	W 2–0	12–5–0	Baujan Field (164); Dayton, OH
11/12/2017; 12:00 pm	(2) No. 24	vs. (1) No. 25 UMass; Championship	L 1–3	12–6–0	Baujan Field (164); Dayton, OH
NCAA tournament
11/19/2017; 5:00 pm	(16) No. 22	No. 24 Butler; Second Round	L 2–3	12–7–0	Sports Backers Stadium (679); Richmond, VA
*Non-conference game. ^{#}Rankings from United Soccer Coaches. (#) Tournament seedings in parentheses.

== Rankings ==
=== National rankings ===
Ranking movement Legend: ██ Improvement in ranking. ██ Decrease in ranking. ██ Not ranked the previous week. RV=Others receiving votes.
Poll	Pre	Wk 1	Wk 2	Wk 3	Wk 4	Wk 5	Wk 6	Wk 7	Wk 8	Wk 9	Wk 10	Wk 11	Wk 12	Wk 13	Wk 14	Wk 15	Wk 16	Final
United Soccer								RV	RV	RV	22	24	22	None Released				RV
TopDrawerSoccer.com											RV	17	16	17	25	25	25	25
CollegeSoccerNews.com										RV	RV	24	26	29	None Released			RV

=== Regional rankings ===
Ranking movement Legend: ██ Improvement in ranking. ██ Decrease in ranking. ██ Not ranked. RV=Others receiving votes.
Poll	1st	2nd	3rd	4th	5th	6th	7th	8th	9th	10th	11th	12th
USC Midwest Region							9	9	7	4	4	7

== Awards ==
Recipient	Award	Date	Ref.
Rafael Santos	Atlantic 10 Offensive Player of the Year	November 13, 2017	
Francesco Amorosino	Atlantic 10 All-Second Team	November 13, 2017	
Luc Fatton	Atlantic 10 All-Second Team	November 13, 2017	
Ulrik Edvarsen	Atlantic 10 All-Rookie Team	November 13, 2017	
Mario Sequeira	Atlantic 10 All-Rookie Team	November 13, 2017	
Rafael Santos	CSN Second-Team All-American	January 4, 2018	
Rafael Santos	United Soccer Coaches Second-Team All-American	January 5, 2018	

== Season statistics ==
=== Individual ===
Individual Player Statistics (As of January 26, 2017)
Player	App	Goals	Asst	Points	Shots	Shot%	SOG	SOG%	GW	Pk-Att	GA	Saves	SO
Forwards
Walters, Andrew	0	0	0	0	0	0%	0	0%	0	0-0	0	0	0
Midfielders
Agiasiotis, Petros	0	0	0	0	0	0%	0	0%	0	0-0	0	0	0
Amorosino, Francesco	0	0	0	0	0	0%	0	0%	0	0-0	0	0	0
Boehme, Greg	0	0	0	0	0	0%	0	0%	0	0-0	0	0	0
Cooke, Travis	0	0	0	0	0	0%	0	0%	0	0-0	0	0	0
Gonnella, Joe	0	0	0	0	0	0%	0	0%	0	0-0	0	0	0
Gonnella, Tony	0	0	0	0	0	0%	0	0%	0	0-0	0	0	0
Lockaby, Eli	0	0	0	0	0	0%	0	0%	0	0-0	0	0	0
Moreland, Lyndsey	0	0	0	0	0	0%	0	0%	0	0-0	0	0	0
Munts, Fortia	0	0	0	0	0	0%	0	0%	0	0-0	0	0	0
Santos, Rafael	0	0	0	0	0	0%	0	0%	0	0-0	0	0	0
Vargas, Gerald	0	0	0	0	0	0%	0	0%	0	0-0	0	0	0
Defenders
Dal Molin, Steven	0	0	0	0	0	0%	0	0%	0	0-0	0	0	0
Ekoue, Cedric	0	0	0	0	0	0%	0	0%	0	0-0	0	0	0
Graham, Austin	0	0	0	0	0	0%	0	0%	0	0-0	0	0	0
Roberts, R. J.	0	0	0	0	0	0%	0	0%	0	0-0	0	0	0
Shimazaki, Ryo	0	0	0	0	0	0%	0	0%	0	0-0	0	0	0
Goalkeepers
Gardan, Pierre	0	0	0	0	0	0%	0	0%	0	0-0	0	0	0
Rice, Joseph	0	0	0	0	0	0%	0	0%	0	0-0	0	0	0
Team													
Total													
Opponents													

Legend
App	Appearances	Asst	Assists	Shot%	Shots for Goal Percent
SOG	Shots on Goal	SOG%	Shots on Goal Percent	GW	Game Winning Goals
PK-Att	Penalty Kicks-Attempts	GA	Goals Against	SO	Shut Outs
	Team high

== MLS Draft ==
The following members of the 2017 VCU Rams men's soccer team were selected in the 2018 MLS SuperDraft.

Player	Round	Pick	Position	MLS club	Ref.
Rafael Andrade Santos	4	74	MF	D.C. United	
