= 2017 Atlantic 10 men's soccer tournament =

- Classification: Division I
- Quarterfinals site: Higher seeds
- Semifinals site: Baujan Field; Dayton, Ohio
- Finals site: Baujan Field; Dayton, Ohio
- Champions: UMass (3rd title)
- Winning coach: Fran O'Leary (1st title)
- MVP: Matthew Mooney (UMass)
- Broadcast: A10 Network

2017 Atlantic 10 Conference men's soccer standings
	Conf.					Overall
Team	W		L		T	W		L		T
UMass ‡	6	–	1	–	1	15	–	4	–	3
VCU +	6	–	2	–	0	13	–	7	–	0
George Washington	6	–	2	–	0	9	–	7	–	2
Dayton	6	–	2	–	0	9	–	8	–	2
No. 11 Fordham +	5	–	2	–	1	14	–	6	–	3
Rhode Island	4	–	3	–	1	10	–	6	–	3
St. Bonaventure	4	–	4	–	0	8	–	9	–	2
Saint Louis	4	–	4	–	0	7	–	9	–	1
Davidson	3	–	4	–	1	8	–	7	–	2
LaSalle	3	–	5	–	0	8	–	9	–	1
Saint Joseph's	1	–	6	–	1	3	–	11	–	4
Duquesne	1	–	7	–	0	3	–	13	–	1
George Mason	0	–	7	–	1	5	–	9	–	2
‡ – 2017 Atlantic 10 Tournament champion + – Invited to the 2017 NCAA Division I Men's Soccer Championship; As of December 13, 2017; Rankings from United Soccer Coaches

The 2017 Atlantic 10 men's soccer tournament, was the 20th edition of the Atlantic 10 Men's Soccer Tournament. It determined the Atlantic 10 Conference's automatic berth into the 2017 NCAA Division I Men's Soccer Championship.

UMass won their third ever A-10 title, and their first in 10 years, defeating VCU 3-1 in the final. VCU reached the championship for a third-consecutive season.

The tournament was hosted by the University of Dayton and all matches from the semifinals onward will be contested at Baujan Field.

== Seeds ==
The top eight teams based on conference regular season record will participate in the tournament.

Seed	School	Conference	Tiebreaker
1	UMass	6–1–1	
2	VCU	6–2–0	+GD
3	George Washington	6–2–0	+GD
4	Dayton	6–2–0	+GD
5	Fordham	5–2–1	
6	Rhode Island	4–3–1	
7	St. Bonaventure	4–4–0	+GD
8	Saint Louis	4–4–0	+GD

== Bracket ==
Quarterfinals; November 4–5
1	UMass	1
8	Saint Louis	0
4	Dayton	2
5	Fordham	3
2	VCU	4
7	St. Bonaventure	1
3	George Washington	0
6	Rhode Island	1

Semifinals; Friday, November 10
1	UMass (OT)	1
5	Fordham	0
2	VCU	2
6	Rhode Island	0

Championship; Sunday, November 12
1	UMass	3
2	VCU	1

== Results ==
=== Quarterfinals ===
November 4
1:00 PM EST

^{No. 3} George Washington Colonials	0–1	^{No. 6} Rhode Island Rams
Seemungal (yellow card) 11'; Fitch (yellow card) 46'	Report	Dickson 12'; Zarokostas (yellow card) 18'; Brangman (yellow card) 35'; Leifhelm (yellow card) 85'

Mount Vernon Athletic Field, Washington, D.C.
Attendance: 511
Referee: Andrew Dennis

November 4
7:00 PM EST

^{No. 4} Dayton Flyers	2–3	^{No. 5} Fordham Rams
Lianes (yellow card) 36'; Taneski (yellow card) 60'; Nino (yellow card) 63'; Helgason 65'; Haupt 78'	Report	Dziedzic 35'; Ohlendorf (yellow card) 63'; Oland 75'; Loebe 83'

Baujan Field, Dayton, Ohio
Attendance: 318
Referee: Shane Magaris

November 5
1:00 PM EST

^{No. 1} UMass Minutemen	1–0	^{No. 8} Saint Louis
O'Dwyer 31'; Fulton (yellow card) 58'	Report	Sarr (red card) 89'

Rudd Field, Amherst, Massachusetts
Attendance: 605

November 5
7:00 PM EST

^{No. 2} VCU Rams	4–1	^{No. 7} St. Bonaventure Bonnies
Haji 27'; Dal Molin (yellow card) 34'; Santos 66', 82'; Fatton 72'	Report	Dyck 64'

Sports Backers Stadium, Richmond, Virginia
Attendance: 274
Referee: Brett Bosley

=== Semifinals ===
November 10
4:30 PM EST

^{No. 1} UMass Minutemen	1–0 (a.e.t.)	^{No. 5} Fordham Rams
Smith (yellow card) 6'; O'Dwyer (yellow card) 32'; Gorich 95'	Report	Oland (yellow card) 86'

Baujan Field, Dayton, Ohio
Attendance: 164
Referee: Neil Barbulescu

November 10
7:30 PM EST

^{No. 2} VCU Rams	2–0	^{No. 6} Rhode Island Rams
Shimazaki (yellow card) 39'; Santos 70'; Haji 82'	Report	Benco (yellow card) 31'; Zarokostas (yellow card) 54'; Davids (yellow card) 84'

Baujan Field, Dayton, Ohio
Attendance: 164
Referee: Brandon Artis

=== Final ===
November 12
12:00 PM EST

^{No. 1} UMass Minutemen	3–1	^{No. 2} VCU Rams
Smith (yellow card) 28' (goal) 77'; Hamill (yellow card) 30'; Mooney 55'; Fulton (yellow card) 67'; Desantis 83'	Report	Dal Molin (yellow card) 26'; Fatton (yellow card) 55'; Amorosino 70'

Baujan Field, Dayton, Ohio
Attendance: 147
Referee: Cory Richardson

== Statistics ==
=== Top goalscorers ===
Rank	Player	College	Goals
1	(Brazil) Rafael Andrade Santos	VCU	3
2	(Somalia) Siad Haji	VCU	2
3	(Italy) Francesco Amorosino	VCU	1
3	(United States) Alex Desantis	UMass	1
3	(United States) Tyler Dickson	Rhode Island	1
3	(Canada) Jacob Dyck	St. Bonaventure	1
3	(United States) Bart Dziedzic	Fordham	1
3	(United States) Luc Fatton	VCU	1
3	(Germany) Konrad Gorich	UMass	1
3	(Germany) Jannik Loebe	Fordham	1
3	(United States) Matthew Mooney	UMass	1
3	(United States) James Haupt	Dayton	1
3	(Iceland) Saemundur Thor Helgason	Dayton	1
3	(England) Connor O'Dwyer	UMass	1
3	(Norway) Jörgen Oland	Fordham	1
3	(United States) Davis Smith	UMass	1

== Awards ==
=== All-Tournament team ===
The Atlantic-10 All-Tournament team was announced following the championship game. Matthew Mooney of UMass won the MVP award.

Note: Flags indicate national team as defined under FIFA eligibility rules; some limited exceptions apply. Players may hold more than one non-FIFA nationality.

No.	Pos.	Nation	Player
1	GK	(United States) USA	Bardia Asefina (UMass)
2	DF	(United States) USA	Tyler Dickson (Rhode Island)
3	DF	(Germany) GER	Konrad Gorich (UMass)
4	DF	(United States) USA	Brandon Merklin (UMass)
5	MF	(Italy) ITA	Francesco Amorosino (VCU)
6	MF	(Germany) GER	Jannik Loebe (Fordham)
7	MF	(United States) USA	Matthew Mooney (UMass)
8	MF	(Brazil) BRA	Rafael Andrade Santos (VCU)
9	MF	(United States) USA	Davis Smith (UMass)
10	FW	(Somalia) SOM	Said Haji (VCU)
11	FW	(United States) USA	James Haupt (Dayton)

== See also ==
- 2017 Atlantic 10 Conference men's soccer season
- 2017 Atlantic 10 Conference Women's Soccer Tournament
