= 2017 Fordham Rams men's soccer team =

American college soccer season

2017 Fordham Rams men's soccer

NCAA Tournament, Quarterfinals L 1–2 vs. North Carolina
- Conference: Atlantic 10 Conference
- U. Soc. Coaches poll: No. 11
- TopDrawerSoccer.com: No. 8
- Record: 14–5–3 (5–2–1 A10)
- Head coach: Jim McElderry (15th season)
- Assistant coaches: Gavin Wyse (8th season); Brett Axelrod (2nd season)
- Captain: Janos Loebe
- Home stadium: Coffey Field

2017 Atlantic 10 Conference men's soccer standings
	Conf.					Overall
Team	W		L		T	W		L		T
UMass ‡	6	–	1	–	1	15	–	4	–	3
VCU +	6	–	2	–	0	13	–	7	–	0
George Washington	6	–	2	–	0	9	–	7	–	2
Dayton	6	–	2	–	0	9	–	8	–	2
No. 11 Fordham +	5	–	2	–	1	14	–	6	–	3
Rhode Island	4	–	3	–	1	10	–	6	–	3
St. Bonaventure	4	–	4	–	0	8	–	9	–	2
Saint Louis	4	–	4	–	0	7	–	9	–	1
Davidson	3	–	4	–	1	8	–	7	–	2
LaSalle	3	–	5	–	0	8	–	9	–	1
Saint Joseph's	1	–	6	–	1	3	–	11	–	4
Duquesne	1	–	7	–	0	3	–	13	–	1
George Mason	0	–	7	–	1	5	–	9	–	2
‡ – 2017 Atlantic 10 Tournament champion + – Invited to the 2017 NCAA Division I Men's Soccer Championship; As of December 13, 2017; Rankings from United Soccer Coaches

The 2017 Fordham Rams men's soccer team represented Fordham University during the 2017 NCAA Division I men's soccer season. It was the 66th season of the program's existence and their 23rd in the Atlantic 10 Conference. The Rams played their home matches at Coffey Field in The Bronx.

The season was the program's most successful season in the NCAA Division I Men's Soccer Championship. The Rams advanced to the Round of 16 in the tournament for the first time in program history, as well as their first ever quarterfinal appearance. This came after securing their first ever at-large berth in the tournament. It was only the fourth time in program history that the Rams qualified for the NCAA Tournament. On the way to the Round of 16, Fordham secured a come-from-behind victory over St. Francis Brooklyn and five-time NCAA champions, Virginia. In the quarterfinal round, Fordham lost to the third-seeded North Carolina.

== Squad ==
As of November 20, 2017.

Note: Flags indicate national team as defined under FIFA eligibility rules; some limited exceptions apply. Players may hold more than one non-FIFA nationality.

No.	Pos.	Nation	Player
0	GK	(United States) USA	Jordan Black
1	GK	(Ghana) GHA	Rashid Nuhu
2	DF	(United States) USA	Owen Lawrence
3	DF	(United States) USA	Matthew Lewis
4	DF	(Italy) ITA	Vincenzo Zuccala
5	DF	(Norway) NOR	Joergen Oland
6	DF	(Germany) GER	Jacob Bohm
7	FW	(Germany) GER	Jannik Loebe
8	DF	(United States) USA	Lachlan Woolsey
9	MF	(Armenia) ARM	Andron Kagramanyan
10	MF	(Germany) GER	Janos Loebe
11	MF	(New Zealand) NZL	Ross Willox
12	DF	(United States) USA	Kyle Losi
13	FW	(United States) USA	Mateo Gowland

No.	Pos.	Nation	Player
14	FW	(United States) USA	Connor Defilipps
15	DF	(United States) USA	Brandon Golden
16	MF	(Poland) POL	Bart Dziedzic
17	MF	(United States) USA	Eric Ohlendorf
18	DF	(United States) USA	Patrick Thees
19	DF	(Italy) ITA	Christopher Bazzini
20	MF	(United States) USA	Liam Howard
21	MF	(United States) USA	Matthew McCann
22	DF	(United States) USA	Matt Miller
23	MF	(Thailand) THA	Chris Pensuwan
24	DF	(United States) USA	Nicholas Meyer
25	MF	(Republic of Ireland) IRL	Luke McNamara
30	GK	(Hungary) HUN	Dan Miklós
31	GK	(United States) USA	Nolan Cloney

== Schedule ==
Date Time, TV	Rank^{#}	Opponent^{#}	Result	Record	Site (Attendance) City, State
Preseason
08/13/2017; 7:00 pm		Stony Brook	T 0–0		Coffey Field; The Bronx, NY
08/16/2017; 4:30 pm		vs. Boston University; Woodstock Academy Cup	L 0–3		Bentley Athletic Complex; Woodstock, CT
Non-conference regular season
08/25/2017*; 5:00 pm		vs. Elon; John Rennie Nike Invitational	T 0–0 ^{2OT}	0–0–1	Koskinen Stadium (1,725); Durham, NC
08/27/2017*; 2:30 pm, ACCN		at Duke; John Rennie Nike Invitational	L 0–3	0–1–1	Koskinen Stadium (582); Durham, NC
09/01/2017*; 7:30 pm, ESPN3		at St. John's; Rivalry	W 1–0	1–1–1	Belson Stadium (1,330); Queens, NY
09/04/2017*; 4:00 pm		at Columbia; Liberty Cup	L 0–1	1–2–1	Commisso Stadium (389); Manhattan, NY
09/08/2017*; 7:00 pm		at Lafayette	W 4–0	2–2–1	Oaks Stadium (437); Easton, PA
09/13/2017*; 7:00 pm		Marist	W 2–1	3–2–1	Coffey Stadium (468); The Bronx, NY
09/16/2017*; 2:00 pm		at Quinnipiac	W 1–0	4–2–1	QU Soccer Stadium (734); Hamden, CT
09/20/2017*; 7:00 pm		Manhattan; Battle of the Bronx	W 3–0	5–2–1	Coffey Field (214); The Bronx, NY
09/23/2017*; 1:00 pm		Bryant	W 1–0	6–2–1	Coffey Field (345); The Bronx, NY
Atlantic 10 regular season
09/30/2017; 7:00 pm		at George Mason	T 1–1 ^{2OT}	6–2–2 (0–0–1)	George Mason Stadium (831); Fairfax, VA
10/04/2017; 7:00 pm		La Salle	W 1–0	7–2–2 (1–0–1)	Coffey Field (285); The Bronx, NY
10/07/2017; 7:00 pm		VCU	L 0–1	7–3–2 (1–1–1)	Coffey Field (211); The Bronx, NY
10/11/2017; 7:00 pm		at St. Bonaventure	W 2–0	8–3–2 (2–1–1)	Marra Athletics Complex (54); Olean, NY
10/14/2017; 7:00 pm		Saint Joseph's	W 1–0	9–3–2 (3–1–1)	Coffey Field (264); The Bronx, NY
10/21/2017; 7:00 pm		at Rhode Island	W 2–0	10–3–2 (4–1–1)	URI Soccer Complex (1,000); Kingston, RI
10/28/2017; 7:00 pm		Saint Louis	L 1–2	10–4–2 (4–2–1)	Coffey Field (312); The Bronx, NY
11/01/2017; 2:00 pm		at No. 25 UMass	W 3–2	11–4–2 (5–2–1)	Rudd Field (463); Amherst, MA
Atlantic 10 Tournament
11/04/2017; 7:00 pm, A10N	(5)	at (4) Dayton; Quarterfinals	W 3–2	12–4–2	Baujan Field (318); Dayton, OH
11/10/2017; 4:30 pm, A10N	(5)	vs. (1) No. 24 UMass; Semifinals	L 0–1 ^{OT}	12–5–2	Baujan Field (164); Dayton, OH
NCAA Tournament
11/16/2017*; 7:00 pm, A10N		St. Francis Brooklyn; First Round	W 3–2 ^{OT}	13–5–2	Coffey Field (634); The Bronx, NY
11/19/2017*; 5:00 pm, ESPN3		at (11) No. 8 Virginia; Second Round	W 1–0	14–5–2	Klöckner Stadium (949); Charlottesville, VA
11/25/2017*; 6:00 pm, ESPN3		at (6) No. 14 Duke; Third Round	T 2–2 (W 8–7 PK) ^{2OT}	14–5–3	Koskinen Stadium (494); Durham, NC
12/02/2017*; 6:00 pm, ESPN3		at (3) No. 7 North Carolina; Quarterfinals	L 1–2	14–6–3	WakeMed Soccer Park (1,687); Cary, NC
*Non-conference game. ^{#}Rankings from United Soccer Coaches. (#) Tournament seedings in parentheses.

== Appearances and goals ==
Numbers in parentheses denote appearances as substitute.
Players listed with no appearances have been in the matchday squad but only as unused substitutes.
Key to positions: GK – Goalkeeper; DF – Defender; MF – Midfielder; FW – Forward

Players included in matchday squads
No.	Pos.	Nat.	Name	League		A10 Tournament		NCAA Tournament		Total		Discipline	
No.	Pos.	Nat.	Name	Apps	Goals	Apps	Goals	Apps	Goals	Apps	Goals	A yellow rectangle, denoting the yellow penalty card shown to a player being cautioned	A red rectangle, denoting the red penalty card shown to a player being sent off
0	GK	USA	Jordan Black	0	0	0	0	0	0	0	0	0	0
1	GK	GHA	Rashid Nuhu	17	0	2	0	2	0	21	0	0	0
2	DF	USA	Owen Lawrence	9 (4)	0	1 (1)	0	0 (1)	0	10 (6)	0	0	0
3	DF	USA	Matthew Lewis	17	1	2	0	2	1	21	2	1	0
4	DF	ITA	Vincenzo Zuccala	0	0	0	0	0	0	0	0	0	0
5	DF	NOR	Joergen Oland	0	0	0	0	0	0	0	0	0	0
6	DF	NOR	Jacob Bohm	0	0	0	0	0	0	0	0	0	0
7	FW	GER	Jannik Loebe	0	0	0	0	0	0	0	0	0	0
8	DF	USA	Lachlan Woolsey	0	0	0	0	0	0	0	0	0	0
9	MF	ARM	Andron Kagramanyan	0	0	0	0	0	0	0	0	0	0
10	MF	GER	Janos Loebe	0	0	0	0	0	0	0	0	0	0
11	MF	NZL	Ross Willox	0	0	0	0	0	0	0	0	0	0
12	DF	USA	Kyle Losi	0	0	0	0	0	0	0	0	0	0
13	FW	USA	Mateo Gowland	0	0	0	0	0	0	0	0	0	0
14	FW	USA	Connor Defilipps	0	0	0	0	0	0	0	0	0	0
15	DF	USA	Brandon Golden	0	0	0	0	0	0	0	0	0	0
16	MF	POL	Bart Dziedzic	0	0	0	0	0	0	0	0	0	0
17	MF	USA	Eric Ohlendorf	0	0	0	0	0	0	0	0	0	0
18	MF	USA	Patrick Thees	0	0	0	0	0	0	0	0	0	0
20	MF	ITA	Christopher Bazzini	0	0	0	0	0	0	0	0	0	0
21	MF	USA	Matthew McCann	0	0	0	0	0	0	0	0	0	0
22	MF	USA	Matt Miller	0	0	0	0	0	0	0	0	0	0
23	MF	THA	Chris Pensuwan	0	0	0	0	0	0	0	0	0	0
24	DF	USA	Nicholas Meyer	0	0	0	0	0	0	0	0	0	0
25	MF	IRE	Luke McNamara	0	0	0	0	0	0	0	0	0	0
30	GK	HUN	Dan Miklós	0	0	0	0	0	0	0	0	0	0
31	GK	USA	Nolan Cloney	0	0	0	0	0	0	0	0	0	0
