= 2015 Atlantic 10 men's soccer tournament =

Tournament details
- Country: United States
- Teams: 8

Final positions
- Champions: Dayton
- Runner-up: VCU

Tournament statistics
- Matches played: 6
- Goals scored: 23 (3.83 per match)
- Top goal scorer(s): Amass Amankona (4)

Awards
- Best player: Amass Amankona (Dayton)

The 2015 Atlantic 10 Men's Soccer Tournament, known as the 2015 Atlantic 10 Men's Soccer Tournament Presented by Amtrak for sponsorship reasons, was the nineteenth edition of the tournament. It determined the Atlantic 10 Conference's automatic berth into the 2015 NCAA Division I Men's Soccer Championship. Fordham entered the tournament as the defending champions.

The Dayton Flyers won the Atlantic 10 title, besting the VCU Rams, 4–1 in the championship match. It was Dayton's first A-10 title since 2008. VCU previously made the A-10 final in 2012, where they lost to Saint Louis, also by a three-goal scoreline.

The tournament was hosted by George Mason University and all matches were contested at George Mason Stadium.

== Qualification ==
2015 Atlantic 10 Conference men's soccer standings
	Conf.					Overall
Team	W		L		T	W		L		T
George Washington	6	–	2	–	0	11	–	8	–	0
Dayton ‡	5	–	1	–	2	13	–	5	–	5
Saint Louis	4	–	2	–	2	8	–	7	–	2
Rhode Island	4	–	3	–	1	10	–	8	–	2
Fordham	4	–	3	–	1	7	–	8	–	4
Duquesne	4	–	3	–	1	6	–	11	–	2
UMass	4	–	3	–	1	5	–	13	–	1
VCU	3	–	2	–	3	7	–	10	–	4
George Mason	3	–	3	–	2	7	–	8	–	2
Saint Joseph's	3	–	4	–	1	4	–	12	–	2
LaSalle	2	–	5	–	1	6	–	10	–	2
Davidson	2	–	6	–	0	5	–	10	–	3
St. Bonaventure	1	–	7	–	0	2	–	16	–	1
‡-Tournament champion +- Invited to the NCAA Division I Men's Soccer Championship; As of November 22, 2015; Rankings from NSCAA

The top eight teams in the Atlantic 10 Conference based on their conference regular season records qualified for the tournament.

== Bracket ==
Quarterfinals
1	George Washington	0
8	VCU	4
4	Fordham	1
5	UMass	0
2	Dayton	3
7	Duquesne	1
3	Saint Louis	2
6	Rhode Island	4

Semifinals
8	VCU	1
4	Fordham	0
2	Dayton	2
6	Rhode Island	1

Championship
8	VCU	1
2	Dayton	4

== Schedule ==
=== Quarter-finals ===
November 12	George Washington	0–4	VCU	Fairfax, Virginia
11:00 ET		Report	Rafael Santos 34'; Herranz 36', 86'; Fatton 85'	Stadium: George Mason Stadium; Attendance: 229; Referee: Cory Richardson

November 12	Fordham	1–0	UMass	Fairfax, Virginia
14:00 ET	Loebe 83'	Report		Stadium: George Mason Stadium; Attendance: 229; Referee: Mark Gorak

November 12	Dayton	3–1	Duquesne	Fairfax, Virginia
17:00 ET	Amankona 40', 77'; Haupt 73'	Report	Phillips 52'	Stadium: George Mason Stadium; Attendance: 229; Referee: Andrew Chapin

November 12	Saint Louis	2–4	Rhode Island	Fairfax, Virginia
20:00 ET	Cicciarelli 80'; Hein 89' (pen.)	Report	Richter 4', 69'; Dickson 59'; Bailey 78'	Stadium: George Mason Stadium; Attendance: 229; Referee: John McCloskey

=== Semi-finals ===
November 13	Fordham	0–1	VCU	Fairfax, Virginia
17:00 ET		Report	Rafael Santos 45'	Stadium: George Mason Stadium; Attendance: 125; Referee: Shaun Papperman

November 13	Dayton	2–1	Rhode Island	Fairfax, Virginia
19:30 ET	Amankona 45'; Bojang 80'	Report	Casey 19'	Stadium: George Mason Stadium; Attendance: 125; Referee: Cory Richardson

=== A-10 Championship ===
November 15	Dayton	4–1	VCU	Fairfax, Virginia
12:00 ET	Bojan 15'; Amankwaah 59'; Schoonderwoerd 73'; Sedin 79'		Barnathan 71'	Stadium: George Mason Stadium

== Statistical leaders ==
=== Top goalscorers ===
Rank	Player	College	Goals
1	(Ghana) Amass Amankona	Dayton Flyers	3
2	(The Gambia) Kissima Bojang	Dayton Flyers	2
2	(Spain) Jorge Herranz	VCU Rams	2
2	(Germany) Dominik Richter	Rhode Island Rams	2
2	(Brazil) Rafael Santos	VCU Rams	2
3	(Ghana) Alex Amankwaah	Dayton Flyers	1
3	(United States) Ryan Bailey	Rhode Island Rams	1
3	(United States) Dakota Barnathan	VCU Rams	1
3	(United States) Mike Casey	Rhode Island Rams	1
3	(United States) Vince Cicciarelli	Saint Louis Billikens	1
3	(United States) Luc Fatton	VCU Rams	1
3	(Germany) Jannik Loebe	Fordham Rams	1
3	(United States) Tyler Dickson	Rhode Island Rams	1
3	(United States) James Haupt	Dayton Flyers	1
3	(Germany) Lennart Hein	Saint Louis Billikens	1
3	(Canada) Colin Phillips	Duquesne Dukes	1
3	(Netherlands) Maik Schoonderwoerd	Dayton Flyers	1

As of 15 November 2015

== Tournament Best XI ==
Note: Flags indicate national team as defined under FIFA eligibility rules; some limited exceptions apply. Players may hold more than one non-FIFA nationality.

No.	Pos.	Nation	Player
1	GK	(France) FRA	Pierre Gardan (VCU)
2	DF	(Costa Rica) CRC	Dennis Castillo (VCU)
3	DF	(United States) USA	R. J. Roberts (VCU)
4	DF	(Spain) ESP	Carlos Sendin (Dayton)
5	MF	(The Gambia) GAM	Kissima Bojang (Dayton)
6	MF	(Germany) GER	Jannik Loebe (Fordham)
7	MF	(South Africa) RSA	Carlo Davids (Rhode Island)
8	MF	(Germany) GER	Dominik Richter (Coastal Carolina)
9	MF	(United States) USA	James Haupt (Dayton)
10	FW	(Ghana) GHA	Amass Amankona (Dayton)
11	FW	(Spain) ESP	Jorge Herranz (VCU)

== See also ==
- Atlantic 10 Conference
- 2015 NCAA Division I men's soccer season
- 2015 NCAA Division I Men's Soccer Championship
