= D.C. College Cup =

Soccer championship in the U.S.

- Organizing body: NCAA
- Founded: 2007
- Abolished: 2016; 9 years ago
- Region: Washington
- Last champion(s): American (2016)
- Most successful club(s): George Mason (5 titles)

The D.C. College Cup, officially known as the Kuykenstrong D.C. College Cup for sponsorship reasons, was an early season, non-conference college soccer tournament played between the NCAA Division I men's soccer programs in the Washington metropolitan area.

The teams that participated in the past include American, George Mason, George Washington, Georgetown, Howard and Maryland.

== Champions ==
=== Results ===
Ed.	Year	Champion	Runner-up	3rd Place	Ref.
1	2007	George Washington (1)	American	George Mason	
2	2008	George Washington (2)	George Mason	American	
3	2009	American (1)	George Mason	George Washington	
4	2010	George Mason (1)	George Washington	American	
5	2011	George Mason (2)	American	George Washington	
6	2012	George Mason (3)	American	George Washington	
7	2013	George Mason (4)	American	George Washington	
8	2014	George Mason (5)	George Washington	American	
9	2015	American (2)	George Mason	George Washington	
10	2016	American (3)	George Mason	n/a	

=== Titles by team ===
Team	Titles	Winning years
George Mason	5	2010, 2011, 2012, 2013, 2014
American	3	2009, 2015, 2016
George Washington	2	2007, 2008
