= Clément Benhaddouche =

French-born Hong Kong footballer (born 1996)

Clément Benhaddouche 賓紀文
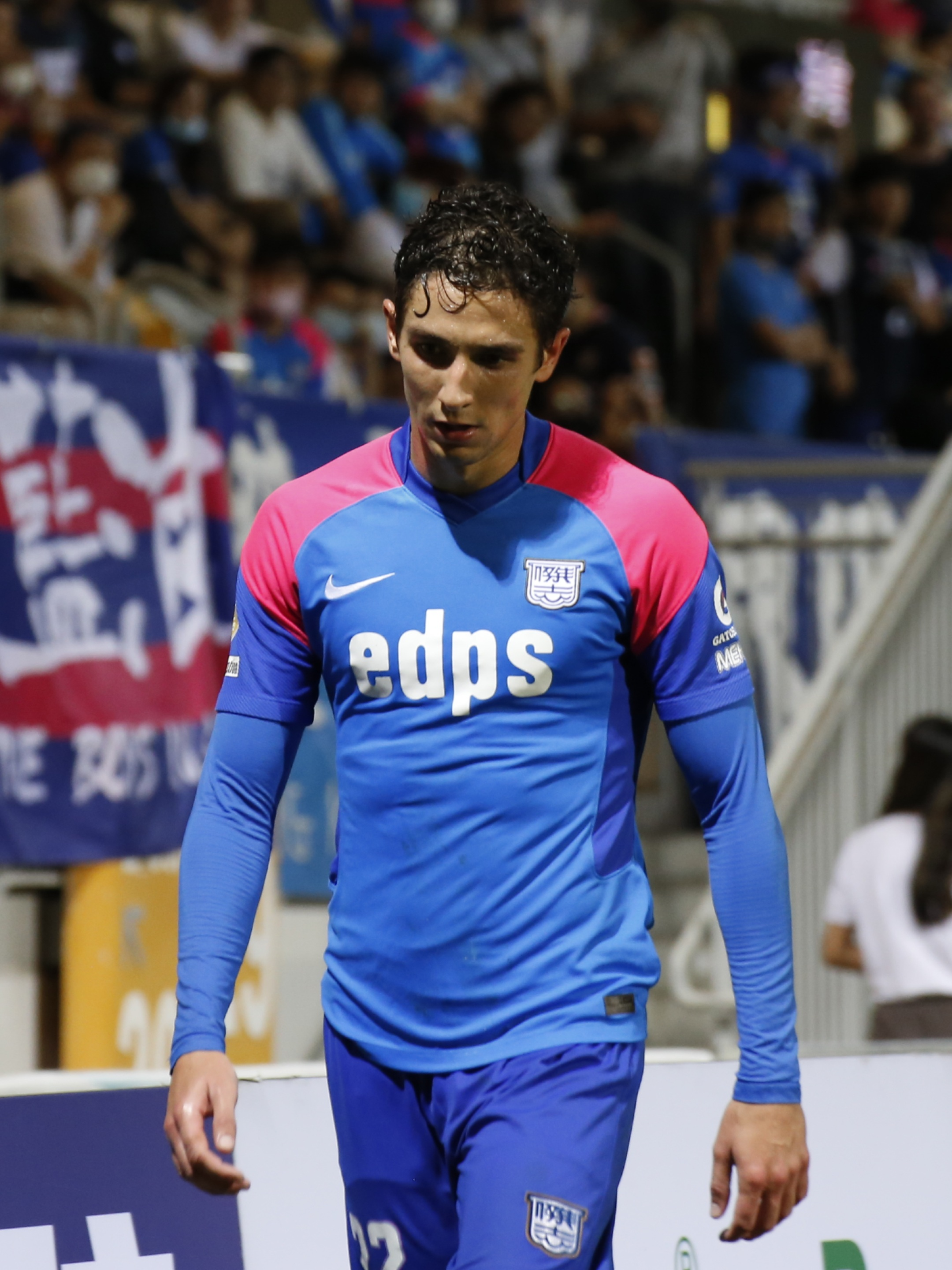
- Benhaddouche playing for Kitchee

Personal information
- Full name: Clément Sami Nicolas Benhaddouche
- Date of birth: 11 May 1996 (age 30)
- Place of birth: Lille, France
- Height: 1.81 m (5 ft 11 in)
- Positions: Right winger; right back

Team information
- Current team: Changchun Yatai
- Number: 22

Youth career
- 2008–2012: Kitchee
- 2012–2014: IMG Academy

College career
Years	Team	Apps	(Gls)
2015–2018	UMass Minutemen	32	(0)

Senior career*
Years	Team	Apps	(Gls)
2018	IMG Academy	11	(1)
2019–2023	Kitchee	29	(3)
2023	Heilongjiang Ice City	12	(1)
2024	Suzhou Dongwu	11	(0)
2025	Eastern	7	(0)
2025	Shenzhen Juniors	11	(0)
2026–	Changchun Yatai	16	(0)

International career^{‡}
2025–	Hong Kong	2	(0)
- * Club domestic league appearances and goals as of 8 November 2026 ‡ National team caps and goals as of 7 September 2025

Clément Sami Nicolas Benhaddouche (Chinese: 賓紀文; born 11 May 1996) is a professional footballer who currently plays as a right winger or a right back for China League One club Changchun Yatai. Born in France, he plays for the Hong Kong national team.

== College career ==
Benhaddouche spent his college career in the United States, playing for UMass Minutemen in NCAA Division I. During his season in 2018, he made 11 appearances with five starts in 462 minutes of action. He had two assists and attempted six shots in a 3–1 win at George Washington on 31 October to help clinch an A-10 Tournament appearance for the Minutemen. Benhaddouche also found the back of the net for his first career goal in a 1–1 draw at VCU on 4 November in the A-10 Tournament.

== Club career ==
On 16 January 2019, Kitchee announced the joining of Benhaddouche after his graduation from college. He scored his first goal for Kitchee in the HKPL match against Pegasus on 23 February 2019.

On 28 July 2023, Benhaddouche signed with China League One club Heilongjiang Ice City on a free transfer.

On 9 February 2024, Benhaddouche joined fellow China League One club Suzhou Dongwu.

On 27 February 2025, Benhaddouche returned to Hong Kong and joined Eastern.

On 18 July 2025, Benhaddouche joined China League One club Shenzhen Juniors.

On 9 February 2026, Benhaddouche joined fellow China League One club Changchun Yatai.

== International career ==
In July 2023, it was announced that Benhaddouche had renounced his French passport to receive his HKSAR passport, making him eligible to represent Hong Kong internationally.

In December 2023, Benhaddouche had been called up for the local training camp in preparation for the 2023 AFC Asian Cup.

On 15 July 2025, Clement made his international debut for Hong Kong in a 2025 EAFF E-1 Football Championship Final Round match against China after substituting Yue Tze Nam in the 44th minute.

== Personal life ==
Benhaddouche was born on 11 May 1996 in Lille to French-Algerian parents. He moved to Hong Kong shortly after he was born. Clement attended the Canadian International School of Hong Kong with former teammate Matt Orr.

== Career statistics ==
=== Club ===
As of 27 June 2026.

Club	Season	League			National Cup		League Cup		Continental		Other		Total	
Club	Season	Division	Apps	Goals	Apps	Goals	Apps	Goals	Apps	Goals	Apps	Goals	Apps	Goals
IMG Academy	2018	PDL	11	1	0	0	–		–		0	0	11	1
Kitchee	2018–19	Hong Kong Premier League	5	1	0	0	1 (Note: Appearances in Hong Kong Senior Challenge Shield)	0	0 (Note: Appearances in AFC Cup)	0	1 (Note: Appearances in Hong Kong Sapling Cup)	0	7	1
Kitchee	2019–20	Hong Kong Premier League	4	0	0	0	1	0	0	0	2	0	7	0
Kitchee	2020–21	Hong Kong Premier League	7	1	–		–		0 (Note: Appearances in AFC Champions League)	0	3	0	10	1
Kitchee	2021–22	Hong Kong Premier League	0	0	–		–		0	0	–		0	0
Kitchee	2022–23	Hong Kong Premier League	13	1	3	0	2	0	–		2	0	20	1
Kitchee	Total		29	3	3	0	4	0	0	0	8	0	44	3
Heilongjiang Ice City	2023	China League One	12	1	0	0	–		–		–		12	1
Suzhou Dongwu	2024	China League One	11	0	0	0	–		–		–		11	0
Eastern	2024–25	Hong Kong Premier League	7	0	3	0	0	0	0 (Note: Appearances in AFC Champions League Two)	0	1	0	11	0
Shenzhen Juniors	2025	China League One	11	0	0	0	–		–		–		11	0
Changchun Yatai	2026	China League One	8	0	0	0	–		–		–		8	0
Career total			89	5	6	0	4	0	0	0	9	0	108	5

=== International ===
As of 7 September 2025

National team	Year	Apps	Goals
Hong Kong	2025	2	0
Total		2	0

== Honours ==
=== Club ===
Kitchee

- Hong Kong Premier League: 2019–20, 2020–21, 2022–23
- Hong Kong Senior Shield: 2018–19, 2022–23
- Hong Kong FA Cup: 2018–19, 2022–23
- Hong Kong Sapling Cup: 2019–20

Eastern

- Hong Kong FA Cup: 2024–25
