= Mel Mahler =

American soccer coach

Personal information
- Place of birth: Smithtown, New York
- Position: Midfielder

College career
Years	Team	Apps	(Gls)
1975–1978	High Point Panthers		

Managerial career
- 1978–1981: High Point Panthers (assistant)
- 1981–1984: Akron Zips (assistant)
- 1984–1987: Pfeiffer Falcons
- 1987–1994: Bowling Green Falcons (assistant)
- 1995–2003: Bowling Green Falcons
- 2005–2014: St. Bonaventure Bonnies

Mel Mahler was the head men's soccer coach at St. Bonaventure University. having held that position since 2005 until resigning on November 20, 2014. He previously served as the head men's soccer coach at Bowling Green State University from 1995 to 2003, and also served as the interim head coach there in 1993. He led the Falcons to three straight National Collegiate Athletic Association (NCAA) tournament appearances from 1995 to 1997, and three regular season Mid-American Conference (MAC) championships in 1996, 2000, and 2002.

His teams also won three straight MAC tournament titles from 1995 to 1997. His overall record with the Falcons stands at 111–76–13 (.586). He was named the NSCAA Regional Coach of the year in 1996, as well as the MAC Coach of the year that year. He served as an assistant coach with the Falcons from 1987 to 1992, and in 1994. From 1984 to 1987, he served as the head soccer and lacrosse coach at Pfeiffer University in North Carolina. He served as a graduate assistant coach at University of Akron from 1981 to 1984, and as an assistant coach at High Point University from 1978 to 1981. He is a graduate from High Point University.
