= 2017 St. Francis Brooklyn Terriers men's soccer team =

American college soccer season

2017 St. Francis Brooklyn Terriers men's soccer

NEC Regular Season Champions NEC Tournament Champions

NCAA Tournament, First Round (0–1)
- Conference: Northeast Conference
- Record: 14–5–1 (6–0–1 NEC)
- Head coach: Tom Giovatto (11th season)
- Assistant coaches: Christopher Helms (4th season); Andy Cormack (3rd season)

2017 Northeast Conference men's soccer standings
	Conf.					Overall
Team	W		L		T	W		L		T
St. Francis Brooklyn ‡	6	–	0	–	1	14	–	5	–	1
LIU Brooklyn	4	–	2	–	1	6	–	9	–	3
Fairleigh Dickinson	3	–	2	–	2	10	–	5	–	3
Robert Morris	3	–	3	–	1	4	–	11	–	3
Saint Francis (PA)	3	–	4	–	0	10	–	8	–	0
Central Connecticut	2	–	3	–	2	5	–	8	–	4
Bryant	2	–	3	–	2	2	–	10	–	3
Sacred Heart	0	–	6	–	1	3	–	14	–	1
‡ – 2017 NEC Tournament champion + – Invited to the 2017 NCAA Division I Men's Soccer Championship; As of November 17, 2017; Rankings from United Soccer Coaches

The 2017 St. Francis Brooklyn Terriers men's soccer team represent St. Francis College during the 2017 NCAA Division I men's soccer season. The Terrier's home games are played at Brooklyn Bridge Park, Pier 5. The team has been a member of the Northeast Conference since 1981 and is coached by Tom Giovatto, who was in his eleventh year at the helm of the Terriers.

Going into the season, the Teriers were unanimously picked by the NEC's head coaches to defend its crown in 2017. The Terriers ended their season at 14–5–1 overall and 6–0–1 in conference play. The Terriers won the NEC Regular season championship and the Tournament Championship.

== 2017 squad ==
As of August 21, 2017. Note: Flags indicate national team as defined under FIFA eligibility rules; some limited exceptions apply. Players may hold more than one non-FIFA nationality.

No.	Pos.	Nation	Player
00	GK	USA	George Angelidis
0	GK	ESP	Nicolas Casado
1	GK	ITA	Roberto Bazzichetto
2	MF	USA	Leo Folla
3	DF	USA	Dominick Falanga
4	MF	SCO	Kieran Young
5	DF	FRA	Faouzi Taieb
6	MF	FRA	Sami Gliguem
7	MF	FRA	Anthony Gimenes
8	MF	ITA	Edoardo Belfanti
9	FW	FRA	Ali Tounkara
10	MF	USA	**Federico Curbelo**

No.	Pos.	Nation	Player
11	MF	USA	Amir Islami
12	DF	FRA	Collyns Laokandi
14	DF	USA	Lukas Pusz
15	DF	USA	Domenico Pugliese
16	FW	VEN	Chris Gruver
19	MF	USA	Dennis Coke, Jr.
20	DF	ITA	Marco Torriani
21	FW	ITA	Matteo Caribotti
23	MF	VEN	Tommy De Andrade
24	GK	USA	Ahmed Faiad
33	DF	USA	Nadim Saqui

Captains in bold

== Schedule ==
=== Non-conference ===
August 25 1	UMass	2–1	St. Francis Brooklyn	Amherst, MA
4:00PM EST	Merklin 17'; Rita 54'; Boino (yellow card) 65'	Report	Taieb 25'; Laokandi (red card) 74'	Stadium: Rudd Field; Attendance: 326

August 29 2	St. Francis Brooklyn	2–1	Lafayette	Brooklyn, NY
7:00PM EST	Caribotti 10', 20'; Torriani (yellow card) 42'; Folla (yellow card) 81'	Report	Vare 37'; Koval (yellow card) 43'	Stadium: Brooklyn Bridge Park; Attendance: 172; Referee: Artur Sibiga

September 1 3	St. Francis Brooklyn	3–1	George Washington	Brooklyn, NY
7:00PM EST	Gliguem 39', 43'; Tounkara 89'	Report	Seemungal (yellow card) 72'; Lightbourn 81'	Stadium: Brooklyn Bridge Park; Attendance: 225; Referee: Lorant Varga

September 3 4	Saint Peter's	2–3	St. Francis Brooklyn	Jersey City, NJ
1:00PM EST	Laws 48'; Crentsil (yellow card) 54'; Rodrigues 87'	Report	Gliguem 28'; Falanga 37'; Torriani (yellow card) 43'; Tounkara 72'	Stadium: Joseph J. Jaroschak Field; Attendance: 250; Referee: John Barr

September 6 5	Howard	0–1	St. Francis Brooklyn	Washington, DC
7:00PM EST	Garwood (yellow card) 18'; Grant (yellow card) 53'	Report	Gliguem (yellow card) 76'; Coke Jr. 79'	Stadium: William H. Greene Stadium; Attendance: 75

September 9 6	NJIT	3–0	St. Francis Brooklyn	Hillside, NJ
7:30PM EST	Zapata (yellow card) 3'; Guirassy 34', 62'; Cordeiro 53'; Agnolin (yellow card) 65'; Radon (yellow card) 66'; Onyeaka (yellow card) 75'	Report	Taieb (yellow card) 8'; Curbello (yellow card) 65'	Stadium: Kean University Alumni Stadium; Attendance: 397; Referee: Juan Diaz

September 13 7	St. Francis Brooklyn	0–1	Hartford	Brooklyn, NY
7:00PM EST		Report	Ribeiro 63'	Stadium: Brooklyn Bridge Park; Attendance: 277; Referee: Brian Dunn

September 16 8	Manhattan	1–2	St. Francis Brooklyn	Riverdale, NY
2:00PM EST	Carsley (yellow card) 30'; Hulme (red card) 36'; Meza 63'; Tamas-Leloup (yellow card) 74'	Report	Curbelo (yellow card) 56'; Folla 65'; Taieb 65'; Bazzichetto (yellow card) 81'; Gruver (yellow card) 86'	Stadium: Gaelic Park; Attendance: 180; Referee: Michael De Felice

September 22 9	Cornell	2–1	St. Francis Brooklyn	Ithaca, NY
4:30PM EST	Despinos (yellow card) 37'; Hansan 57', 71'	Report	Curbelo 23'; Gimenes (red card) 90'	Stadium: Charles F. Berman Field; Attendance: 224; Referee: Andrew Evenhouse

September 26 10	St. Francis Brooklyn	2–1	Hartwick	Brooklyn, NY
7:00PM EST	Tounkara 31'; Falanga 56'	Report	O'Grady 74'	Stadium: Brooklyn Bridge Park; Attendance: 486; Referee: Deochand Perphudiel

=== Northeast Conference ===
October 8 11	Fairleigh Dickinson	0–1	St. Francis Brooklyn	Teaneck, NJ
1:00PM EST		Report	Taieb 73'	Stadium: FDU Soccer Field; Attendance: 215; Referee: Brian Dunn

October 13 12	St. Francis Brooklyn	0–0 (a.e.t.)	Sacred Heart	Brooklyn, NY
7:00PM EST	DeAndrade (yellow card) 44'; Gliguem (yellow card) 83'; Laokandi (yellow card) 88'; Falanga (yellow card) 119'	Report	Team (yellow card) 67'; Curras (yellow card) 83'; Linke (yellow card) 83'	Stadium: Brooklyn Bridge Park; Attendance: 110

October 20 13	St. Francis Brooklyn	3–1	Robert Morris	Brooklyn, NY
7:00PM EST	Falanga 54', 58', 60'	Report	McIvor 18'; Thomas (yellow card) 45'; Cooper (yellow card) 57'; Jull (yellow card) 82'	Stadium: Brooklyn Bridge Park; Attendance: 175

October 22 14	St. Francis Brooklyn	1–0	Saint Francis (PA)	Brooklyn, NY
1:00PM EST	Tounkara 76'; Gruver (yellow card) 89'	Report	Kiernan (yellow card) 43'; Rosa (yellow card) 79'; Smolyn (yellow card) 87'	Stadium: Brooklyn Bridge Park; Attendance: 212; Referee: Juan Diaz

October 27 15	Central Connecticut	0–1	St. Francis Brooklyn	New Britain, CT
4:00PM EST		Report	Folla 27'; Gliguem (yellow card) 74'	Stadium: CCSU Soccer Field; Attendance: Ramiro Suarez; Referee: 227

October 30 16	St. Francis Brooklyn	1–0 (a.e.t.)	Bryant	Brooklyn, NY
1:00PM EST	Young 98'	Report		Stadium: Brooklyn Bridge Park; Attendance: 13

November 3 17	LIU Brooklyn	1–2 (a.e.t.)	St. Francis Brooklyn	Brooklyn, NY
1:00PM EST	Solbakken 61'; Charles (yellow card) 81'; Nordstrom (yellow card) 81'	Report	Falanga 64'; Taieb (yellow card) 74'; Gimenes (yellow card) 81'; Saqui 102'	Stadium: LIU Field; Attendance: 245; Referee: Artur Sibiga
Note: Battle of Brooklyn Game

=== Northeast conference tournament ===
November 10 Semifinal	#1 St. Francis Brooklyn	3–0	#4 Robert Morris	Brooklyn, NY
2:00PM	Tounkara 1', 30'; Saqui 88'	Report	McIvor (yellow card) 80'	Stadium: Brooklyn Bridge Park; Attendance: 325; Referee: Brian Dunn

November 12 Championship	#1 St. Francis Brooklyn	5–0	#2 LIU Brooklyn	Brooklyn, NY
1:00PM	Tounkara 9', 59'; Falanga 23'; Gimenes (yellow card) 41'; Tounkara (yellow card) 54'; Gliguem 74'; Saqui 86' (yellow card) 86'	Report	Barone (red card) 90'; Guscott (yellow card) 44'; Peterson (yellow card) 61'; Paredes (yellow card) 67'	Stadium: Brooklyn Bridge Park; Attendance: 445; Referee: Deochand Parbhudial

=== NCAA Division I Men's Soccer Championship ===
November 16 First Round	Fordham	3–2 (a.e.t.)	St. Francis Brooklyn	Bronx, NY
7:00PM	Loebe 71'; Lewis 80'; Oland 95'	Report	Torriani (yellow card) 5'; Folla 8'; Gruver (yellow card) 34'; Saqui 72'; Tounkara (yellow card) 80'	Stadium: Coffey Field; Attendance: 634; Referee: Noel Cotterell

== NSCAA/Continental Tire College rankings ==
Ranking movement Legend: ██ Improvement in ranking. ██ Decrease in ranking. ██ Not ranked. RV=Others receiving votes.
Poll	1st	2nd	3rd	4th	5th	6th	7th	8th	9th	10th	11th	12th
North East Region		8	7	7	9	8	6	7	5	5	4	2

== Awards ==
Faouzi Taieb, Sophomore Defender

- 2017 NEC Defender of the Year
- Selected to the 2017 NEC First Team All-Conference
- Selected to the 2017 NEC Men’s Soccer All-Tournament Team
- Selected 2017 Third team All-American by College Soccer News

Ali Tounkara, Junior Forward

- Selected to the 2017 NEC All-Rookie Team
- Selected to the 2017 NEC Men’s Soccer All-Tournament Team
- 2017 NEC Tournament MVP

Dominic Falanga, Senior Midfielder

- NEC Player of the Week Award (October 16 – 22)
- Selected to the 2017 NEC First Team All-Conference
- Selected to the 2017 NEC Men’s Soccer All-Tournament Team

Nadim Saqui, Senior Forward

- NEC Player of the Week Award (October 30 – November 5)
- Selected to the 2017 NEC Men’s Soccer All-Tournament Team

Collyns Laokandi, Senior Defender

- Selected to the 2017 NEC First Team All-Conference

Robert Bazzichetto, Senior Goalkeeper

- Selected to the 2017 NEC First Team All-Conference

Chris Gruver, Freshman Forward

- NEC Rookie of the Week Award (October 16 – 22)

Federico Curbelo, Senior Midfielder

- Selected to the 2017 NEC Second Team All-Conference

Leo Folla, Senior Defender

- Selected to the 2017 NEC Second Team All-Conference

Matteo Caribotti, Sophomore Forward

- Selected to the 2017 NEC Team All-Rookie Team

Sami Gliguem, Junior Midfielder

- Selected to the 2017 NEC Team All-Rookie Team

== Season statistics ==
Individual Player Statistics (As of November 17, 2017)
Player	App	Goals	Asst	Points	Shots	Shot%	SOG	SOG%	GW	Pk-Att	GA	Saves	SO
Forwards
Tounkara, Ali	20	8	2	18	38	21.1%	25	65.8%	4	0-0	0	0	0
Gruver, Chris	11	0	2	2	3	0%	2	66.7%	0	0-0	0	0	0
Caribotti, Matteo	19	2	3	7	14	14.3%	4	28.6%	1	0-0	0	0	0
Midfielders
DeAndrade, Tommy	15	0	0	0	10	0%	4	40.0%	0	0-0	0	0	0
Curbello, Federico	20	1	6	8	28	3.6%	11	39.3%	0	0-0	0	0	0
Gliguem, Sami	15	4	2	10	21	19.0%	10	47.6%	1	0-1	0	0	0
Young, Kieran	18	1	1	3	3	33.3%	1	33.3%	1	0-0	0	0	0
Islami, Amir	19	0	3	3	8	0%	0	0%	0	0-0	0	0	0
Gimenes, Anthony	19	0	4	4	12	0%	6	50.0%	0	0-0	0	0	0
Belfanti, Edoardo	1	0	0	0	0	0%	0	0%	0	0-0	0	0	0
Folla, Leo	19	3	2	8	10	30.0%	6	60.0%	1	0-0	0	0	0
Coke Jr., Dennis	18	1	0	2	2	50%	2	100%	1	0-0	0	0	0
Defenders
Pusz, Lukas	4	0	0	0	0	0%	0	0%	0	0-0	0	0	0
Laokandi, Collyns	16	0	2	2	17	0%	8	48.1%	0	0-0	0	0	0
Taieb, Faouzi	20	3	1	7	22	13.6%	12	54.5%	2	0-0	0	0	0
Falanga, Dominick	20	7	2	16	36	19.4%	20	55.6%	2	0-0	0	0	0
Pugliese, Domenico	13	0	0	0	2	0%	1	50%	0	0-0	0	0	0
Saqui, Nadim	17	4	0	8	9	44.4%	4	44.4%	1	0-0	0	0	0
Torriani, Marco	20	0	2	2	12	0%	5	41.7%	0	0-0	0	0	0
Goalkeepers
Bazzichetto, Roberto	19	0	0	0	0	0%	0	0%	0	0-0	18	49	7
Angelidis, George	0	0	0	0	0	0%	0	0%	0	0-0	0	0	0
Faiad, Ahmed	0	0	0	0	0	0%	0	0%	0	0-0	0	0	0
Casado, Nicolas	2	0	0	0	0	0%	0	0%	0	0-0	1	5	1
Total	20	34	32	100	247	13.8%	121	49.0%	14	0-1	19	55	8
Opponents	20	19	20	58	165	11.5%	74	44.8%	5	0-0	34	87	3

Legend
App	Appearances	Asst	Assists	SOG	Shots on Goal
SOG%	Shots on Goal Percent	GW	Game Winning Goals	PK-Att	Penalty Kicks-Attempts
GA	Goals Against	SO	Shut Outs	High	Team high

== See also ==
- St. Francis Brooklyn Terriers men's soccer
- 2017 NCAA Division I men's soccer season
- Northeast Conference Men's Soccer Tournament
- 2017 NCAA Division I Men's Soccer Championship
