= Franciscan Cup =

St. Bonaventure–Siena basketball rivalry

- Teams: St. Bonaventure Bonnies; Siena Saints
- First meeting: 1939; St. Bonaventure, 51–43
- Latest meeting: December 9, 2023, St. Bonaventure, 89–56
- Next meeting: December 9, 2024; St. Bonaventure, New York
- Trophy: Franciscan Cup

Statistics
- Total meetings: 34
- All-time series: St. Bonaventure leads 26–8
- Current win streak: St. Bonaventure 1 (2023–present)

The Franciscan Cup is an annual men's basketball contest played between the only two NCAA Division I Association of Franciscan Colleges and Universities member schools.

The annual non-conference men's basketball game allows the winner between Siena and St. Bonaventure to retain the Franciscan Cup until the following year's game.

Prior to the creation of the Franciscan Cup, the two teams had played semi-regularly with St. Bonaventure leading the series with a 25–8 record. The first ever meeting occurred during the 1939–1940 season with St. Bonaventure earning a 51–43 victory.

== Cup History ==
FRANCISCAN CUP HISTORY
Date	Score				Location	Series	Attendance
December 28, 2010	St. Bonaventure	82	Siena	79	Reilly Center	1–0	3,679
November 21, 2011	St. Bonaventure	64	Siena	58	Times Union Center	2–0	6,067
December 4, 2012	St. Bonaventure	58	Siena	43	Reilly Center	3–0	3,482
November 19, 2013	St. Bonaventure	70	Siena	72	Times Union Center	3–1	5,654
November 19, 2014	St. Bonaventure	70	Siena	73	Reilly Center	3–2	3,291
December 22, 2015	St. Bonaventure	70	Siena	73	Times Union Center	3–3	6,593
November 30, 2016	St. Bonaventure	81	Siena	74	Reilly Center	4–3	3,859
November 29, 2017	St. Bonaventure	75	Siena	55	Times Union Center	5–3	5,535
December 5, 2018	St. Bonaventure	82	Siena	40	Reilly Center	6–3	3,485
November 12, 2019	St. Bonaventure	65	Siena	78	Times Union Center	6–4	5,680
November 9, 2021	#23 St. Bonaventure	75	Siena	47	Reilly Center	7–4	4,617
December 19, 2022	St. Bonaventure	70	Siena	76	MVP Arena	7–5	5,616
December 9, 2023	St. Bonaventure	89	Siena	56	Reilly Center	8–5	4,022
December 17, 2024	St. Bonaventure	65	Siena	48	MVP Arena	9–5	5,101

Note: Due to Covid-19 there was no game played in the 2020–21 season.
