= UMass Minutemen soccer =

American college soccer team

- Founded: 1930; 96 years ago
- University: University of Massachusetts Amherst
- Head coach: Fran O'Leary (9th season)
- Conference: The Summit
- Location: Amherst, Massachusetts, US
- Stadium: Rudd Field (capacity: 800)
- Nickname: Minutemen
- Colors: Maroon and white
| Home | Away |

NCAA tournament College Cup
- 2007

NCAA tournament Quarterfinals
- 2007, 2024

NCAA tournament Round of 16
- 2007, 2024

NCAA tournament Round of 32
- 2001, 2007, 2020, 2024

NCAA tournament appearances
- 2001, 2007, 2008, 2017, 2020, 2024

Conference tournament championships
- 2001, 2007, 2017

Conference regular season championships
- 1994, 2000, 2002, 2008, 2017

The UMass Minutemen soccer team is a varsity intercollegiate athletic team of University of Massachusetts Amherst in Amherst, Massachusetts, United States. The team is a member of the Summit League, which is part of the National Collegiate Athletic Association's Division I. UMass' first men's soccer team was fielded in 1930. The team plays its home games at Rudd Field. The Minutemen are coached by Fran O'Leary.

== Seasons ==
Record table
| Season | Coach | Overall | Conference | Standing | Postseason |
|---|---|---|---|---|---|
UMass (Independent) (1930–1986)
| 1930 | Lawrence Briggs | 1–4–0 | | | |
| 1931 | Lawrence Briggs | 6–0–0 | | | |
| 1932 | Lawrence Briggs | 4-1-1 | | | |
| 1933 | Lawrence Briggs | 4-3-0 | | | |
| 1934 | Lawrence Briggs | 2-2-2 | | | |
| 1935 | Lawrence Briggs | 2-4-1 | | | |
| 1936 | Lawrence Briggs | 5-3-0 | | | |
| 1937 | Lawrence Briggs | 4-2-1 | | | |
| 1938 | Lawrence Briggs | 3-2-2 | | | |
| 1939 | Lawrence Briggs | 3-4-0 | | | |
| 1940 | Lawrence Briggs | 2-3-2 | | | |
| 1941 | Lawrence Briggs | 4-2-1 | | | |
| 1942 | Lawrence Briggs | 1-4-3 | | | |
UMass (No team due to World War II) (1943–1945)
| 1946 | Lawrence Briggs | 1-6-0 | | | |
| 1947 | Lawrence Briggs | 4-5-0 | | | |
| 1948 | Lawrence Briggs | 5-4-0 | | | |
| 1949 | Lawrence Briggs | 4-5-1 | | | |
| 1950 | Lawrence Briggs | 2-7-1 | | | |
| 1951 | Lawrence Briggs | 3-6-2 | | | |
| 1952 | Lawrence Briggs | 4-6-1 | | | |
| 1953 | Lawrence Briggs | 6-5-1 | | | |
| 1954 | Lawrence Briggs | 7-5-0 | | | |
| 1955 | Lawrence Briggs | 4-4-0 | | | |
| 1956 | Lawrence Briggs | 1-4-4 | | | |
| 1957 | Lawrence Briggs | 3-4-1 | | | |
| 1958 | Lawrence Briggs | 3-6-0 | | | |
| 1959 | Lawrence Briggs | 2-7-0 | | | |
| 1960 | Lawrence Briggs | 0-10-0 | | | |
| 1961 | Lawrence Briggs | 3-6-1 | | | |
| 1962 | Lawrence Briggs | 5-5-0 | | | |
| 1963 | Lawrence Briggs | 2-7-1 | | | |
| 1964 | Lawrence Briggs | 5-4-1 | | | |
| 1965 | Lawrence Briggs | 7-3-0 | | | |
| 1966 | Lawrence Briggs | 6-3-1 | | | |
| 1967 | Lawrence Briggs | 5-5-0 | | | |
| 1968 | Peter Broacca | 4-6-1 | | | |
| 1969 | Peter Broacca | 6-4-0 | | | |
| 1970 | Peter Broacca | 7-2-2 | | | |
| 1971 | Jack Berryman | 5-3-3 | | | |
| 1972 | Gerry Redmond | 5-3-2 | | | |
| 1973 | Aloysius Rufe | 6-3-1 | | | |
| 1974 | Aloysius Rufe | 8-3-1 | | | |
| 1975 | Aloysius Rufe | 3-9-2 | | | |
| 1976 | Russ Kidd | 5-8-1 | | | |
| 1977 | Russ Kidd | 10-5-0 | | | |
| 1978 | Russ Kidd | 12-5-0 | | | |
| 1979 | Russ Kidd | 7-5-2 | | | |
| 1980 | Russ Kidd | 5-11-0 | | | |
| 1981 | Russ Kidd | 5-10-1 | | | |
| 1982 | Jeff Gettler | 7-8-2 | | | |
| 1983 | Jeff Gettler | 3-12-4 | | | |
| 1984 | Jeff Gettler | 9-8-3 | | | |
| 1985 | Jeff Gettler | 15-6-0 | | | |
| 1986 | Jeff Gettler | 9-10-1 | | | |
UMass (Atlantic 10 Conference) (1987–2024)
| 1987 | Jeff Gettler | 7–11–2 | 2–2–0 | 3rd, East | |
| 1988 | Jeff Gettler | 8–8–2 | 1–2–1 | 4th, East | |
| 1989 | Jeff Gettler | 7–9–2 | 1–3–0 | T–4th, East | |
| 1990 | Jeff Gettler | 3–11–3 | 1–5–2 | 8th | |
| 1991 | Sam Koch | 11–5–4 | 3–3–1 | T–4th | A10 Semifinal |
| 1992 | Sam Koch | 10–6–4 | 4–2–1 | 3rd | A10 Runners-up |
| 1993 | Sam Koch | 9–10–0 | 3–4–0 | T–6th | |
| 1994 | Sam Koch | 13–6–1 | 6–1–0 | 1st | A10 Runners-up |
| 1995 | Sam Koch | 15–5–2 | 8–2–1 | 2nd | A10 Runners-up |
| 1996 | Sam Koch | 10–6–1 | 7–4–0 | T–4th | |
| 1997 | Sam Koch | 11–7–1 | 7–4–0 | T–3rd | |
| 1998 | Sam Koch | 4–12–2 | 4–6–1 | 9th | |
| 1999 | Sam Koch | 13–7–0 | 8–3–0 | T–3rd | A10 Semifinal |
| 2000 | Sam Koch | 12–6–2 | 8–1–1 | T–1st | A10 Semifinal |
| 2001 | Sam Koch | 14–5–1 | 8–3–0 | T–3rd | A10 Champions; NCAA Second round |
| 2002 | Sam Koch | 12–6–2 | 8–1–2 | 1st | A10 Semifinal |
| 2003 | Sam Koch | 11–7–1 | 5–5–1 | T–7th | |
| 2004 | Sam Koch | 8–9–2 | 5–4–2 | 7th | |
| 2005 | Sam Koch | 8–10–2 | 4–3–2 | T–5th | A10 First Round |
| 2006 | Sam Koch | 8–8–3 | 2–6–1 | 12th | |
| 2007 | Sam Koch | 17–8–1 | 6–3–0 | 3rd | A10 Champions; NCAA College Cup |
| 2008 | Sam Koch | 10–8–3 | 7–1–1 | 1st | A10 Runners-up; NCAA First Round |
| 2009 | Sam Koch | 7–7–3 | 4–5–0 | T–9th | |
| 2010 | Sam Koch | 5–5–8 | 4–2–3 | T–6th | |
| 2011 | Sam Koch | 4–13–2 | 2–5–2 | 12th | |
| 2012 | Sam Koch | 5–10–2 | 2–7–0 | 14th | |
| 2013 | Sam Koch | 4–14–1 | 3–5–0 | 8th | A10 Quarterfinal |
| 2014 | Sam Koch | 3–14–1 | 2–5–1 | 12th | |
| 2015 | Fran O'Leary | 5–13–1 | 4–3–1 | 5th | A10 Quarterfinal |
| 2016 | Fran O'Leary | 7–9–3 | 4–2–2 | 4th | A10 Quarterfinal |
| 2017 | Fran O'Leary | 15–4–3 | 6–1–1 | 1st | A10 Champions; NCAA First Round |
| 2018 | Fran O'Leary | 7–8–3 | 3–5–0 | 9th | A10 Quarterfinal |
| 2019 | Fran O'Leary | 7–10–0 | 3–5–0 | 8th | |
| 2020-21 | Fran O'Leary | 7–2-3 | 3–1-2 | | NCAA Second Round |
| 2021 | Fran O'Leary | 8–4–5 | 2–2–4 | 9th | |
| 2022 | Fran O'Leary | 7–4–7 | 2–1–5 | 8th | A10 Quarterfinal |
| 2023 | Fran O'Leary | 7–6–6 | 4–3–1 | 7th | A10 Semifinal |
| 2024 | Fran O'Leary | 10–3–4 | 5–2–1 | 3rd | NCAA Quarterfinal |
UMass (Summit League) (2025–present)
| 2025 | Fran O'Leary | 6–5–6 | 1–3–2 | T–4th | |
| Total: | | 573–566–143 | | | |
National champion Postseason invitational champion Conference regular season champion Conference regular season and conference tournament champion Division regular season champion Division regular season and conference tournament champion Conference tournament champion

Source: 1930–2025 season.

=== NCAA tournament results ===
UMass has appeared in six NCAA tournaments.

| Year | Record | Seed | Region | Round | Opponent | Results |
|---|---|---|---|---|---|---|
| 2001 | 14–5–1 | N/A | Dallas | First round Second round | Creighton; St. John's | W 1–0; L 0–1 |
| 2007 | 17–8–1 | N/A | Boston | First round Second round Round of 16; Quarterfinals; College Cup | Boston University #1 Boston College; Central Connecticut State; UIC #5 Ohio State | W 2–1; W 2–1; W 3–1; W 2–1; L 0–1 |
| 2008 | 10–7–3 | N/A | Winston-Salem | First round | Harvard | L 0–1^{2OT} |
| 2017 | 15–4–3 | N/A | Louisville | First round | Colgate | L 0–2 |
| 2020 | 7-2-3 | N/A | Greensboro | Second round | Penn State | L 4–1 |
| 2024 | 13-4-5 | N/A | Denver | First round Second round Round of 16; Quarterfinals | Evansville #6 Penn #11 Virginia #3 Denver | W 2–1; W 1–0; W 1–0; L 0–3 |

== Coaching history ==
| Years | Coach | Games | W | L | T | Pct. |
|---|---|---|---|---|---|---|
| 1930–1967 | Lawrence Briggs | 302 | 123 | 151 | 28 | .454 |
| 1968–1970 | Peter Broacca | 32 | 17 | 12 | 3 | .578 |
| 1971 | Jack Berryman | 11 | 5 | 3 | 3 | .591 |
| 1972 | Gary Redmond | 10 | 5 | 3 | 2 | .600 |
| 1973–1975 | Aloysius Rufe | 36 | 17 | 15 | 4 | .528 |
| 1976–1981 | Russ Kidd | 92 | 44 | 44 | 4 | .500 |
| 1982–1990 | Jeff Gettler | 170 | 68 | 83 | 19 | .456 |
| 1991–2013 | Sam Koch | 453 | 222 | 182 | 49 | .550 |
| 2014 | Devin O'Neill | 18 | 3 | 14 | 1 | .194 |
| 2015– | Fran O'Leary | 131 | 62 | 55 | 14 | .527 |

== Individual achievements ==
=== All-Americans ===
UMass has produced 18 All-Americans, won by 16 different individuals. The most recent All-American came in 2024.

| Player | Position | Year |
|---|---|---|
| Alec Hughes | FW | 2024 |
| Davis Smith | FW | 2017 |
| Zack Simmons | GK | 2007 |
| Jeff Deren | FW | 2002 |
| Jeff Deren | FW | 2001 |
| Tasso Koutsoukos | MF | 1977 |
| Thomas Coburn | FW | 1974 |
| Raymond Yando | DF | 1965 |
| Raymond Yando | DF | 1964 |
| Richard Repeta | DF | 1962 |
| Stephen Lapton | DF | 1952 |
| Edward McGrath | GK | 1948 |
| Charles Stebbins | DF | 1941 |
| John Giannotti | GK | 1941 |
| John Donovan | FW | 1941 |
| Saul Klaman | DF | 1940 |
| Arthur Howe | DF | 1939 |
| Granville Pruyne | FW | 1932 |

== Notable alumni ==
- (France) Clement Benhaddouche
- (United States) Matt Bolduc
- (United States) Colin Burns
- (Liberia) Michael Butler
- (Haiti) Joenal Castma
- (Japan) Yosuke Hanya
- (United States) Alec Hughes
- (Canada) Tasso Koutsoukos
- (Mali) Hellah Sidibe
- (United States) Bret Simon

=== Active Alumni ===
- Clement Benhaddouche, China L1 - Changchun Yatai F.C.
- Matt Bolduc, - Free agent, (2026 - Sarasota Paradise)
- Yosuke Hanya, USLC - Colorado Springs Switchbacks FC
- Alec Hughes, USLC - Charleston Battery
- Luke Pavone, - Free agent, (2025 - Phuket Andaman F.C.)

== Honors ==
- Atlantic 10 Conference
  - Winners (Tournament) (3): 2001, 2007, 2017
  - Runners-Up (Tournament) (4): 1992, 1994, 1995, 2008
  - Winners (Regular Season) (5): 1994, 2000, 2002, 2008, 2017
  - Runners-Up (Regular Season) (1): 1995
