= Rafael Santos (footballer, born 1995) =

Brazilian footballer

Personal information
- Full name: Rafael Andrade Santos
- Date of birth: 22 May 1995 (age 31)
- Place of birth: Rio de Janeiro, Brazil
- Height: 1.65 m (5 ft 5 in)
- Position: Midfielder

College career
Years	Team	Apps	(Gls)
2015–2017	VCU Rams	55	(20)

Senior career*
Years	Team	Apps	(Gls)
2017–2018	SIMA Águilas	25	(4)
2019	Orlando City B	16	(2)
- * Club domestic league appearances and goals as of March 3, 2020

Rafael Andrade Santos is a Brazilian footballer who last played for Orlando City B of USL League One. Santos had previously played college soccer for Virginia Commonwealth University.

== Career ==
Santos played three years of college soccer at Virginia Commonwealth University, where during his junior season he won the Atlantic 10 Conference Men's Soccer Player of the Year for the 2017 Atlantic 10 Conference men's soccer season.

He made 55 appearances for the Rams, scoring 20 goals. He was drafted 74th overall by D.C. United in the 2018 MLS SuperDraft, but did not sign with the club. He played in USL League Two (then the PDL) during the 2018 PDL season. He made 13 appearances, scoring four goals for SIMA Aguilas.

In late 2018, Rafael signed with Orlando City B of USL League One. On 4 May 2019, he made his professional debut in a 0–0 draw against Chattanooga Red Wolves. On 31 May 2019, Rafael scored his first professional goal in a 2–2 draw away to FC Tucson.
