= Fran O'Leary =

Irish soccer manager (born 1962 or 1963)

Personal information
- Date of birth: 1962 or 1963 (age 63–64)
- Place of birth: Dublin, Ireland

Managerial career
- Years: Team
- Boston College Eagles (assistant)
- New Hampshire Wildcats (assistant)
- 1989–1991: Elmira Eagles
- 1992–1993: Kenyon Lords
- 1994–2000: Dartmouth Big Green
- 2001–2004: George Mason Patriots
- 2005–2012: Bowdoin Polar Bears
- 2013–2014: Toronto FC (assistant)
- 2015–: UMass Minutemen

Fran O'Leary (born 1962 or 1963) is an Irish soccer coach. He is the men's head coach for the UMass Minutemen.

== Playing career ==
O'Leary played on the youth team of League of Ireland Club, St. Patrick's Athletic."

== Coaching career ==
O'Leary started his coaching career as an assistant at Boston College, and later the University of New Hampshire. From 1989 to 1991, he served as the men's soccer head coach at Elmira College, where he posted a 38-11-2 record. From 1992 to 1993, he moved to Kenyon College, where he posted a 32-4-4 record as a head coach. From 1994 to 2000, he was the men's soccer head coach at Dartmouth College, where he went 56-48-14. From 2001 to 2005, he served as the men's soccer head coach at George Mason University. He posted a career record of 160-96-32.

From 2005 to 2012, he served as the men's soccer head coach at Bowdoin College, where he went 74-39-14.

In 2013 O'Leary was made an assistant coach of Toronto FC. He was fired in 2014 along with head coach Ryan Nelsen, assistants Jim Brennan and Duncan Oughton, and strength and conditioning coach Adrian Lamb.

In February 2015, O'Leary was named Men's Soccer Head Coach at the University of Massachusetts.

== Personal life ==
O'Leary was born in Dublin, Ireland. He is married with two children.
