= St. Bonaventure Bonnies men's soccer =

American college soccer team

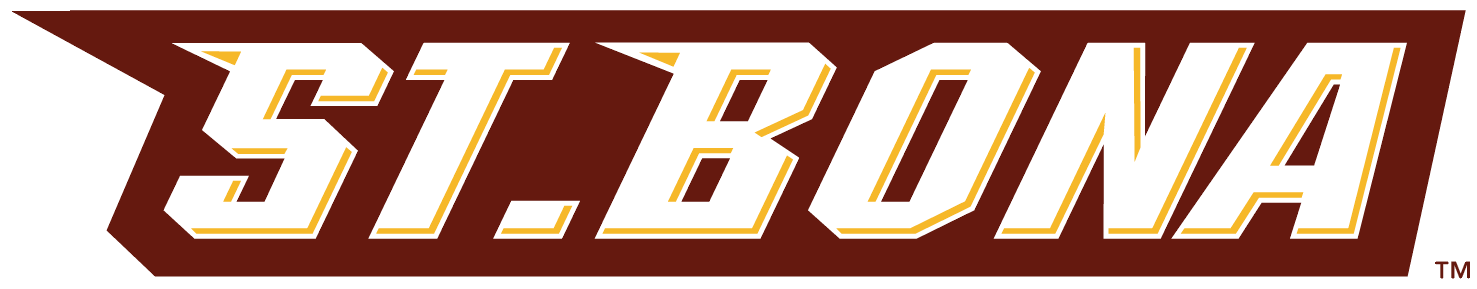
- Founded: 1961; 65 years ago
- University: St. Bonaventure University
- Head coach: Mick Giordano (1st season)
- Conference: A-10
- Location: Allegany, New York, US
- Stadium: Marra Athletics Complex (capacity: 1,000)
- Nickname: Bonnies
- Colors: Brown and white
Home	Away

Pre-tournament ISFA/ISFL championships
- 1894

The St. Bonaventure Bonnies men's soccer team is a varsity intercollegiate athletic team of St. Bonaventure University in Allegheny, New York, United States. The team is a member of the Atlantic 10 Conference, which is part of the National Collegiate Athletic Association's Division I. St. Bonaventure's first men's soccer team was fielded in 1961. The team plays its home games at the Tom and Michelle Marra Athletics Field Complex on St. Bonaventure University's campus. The Bonnies are coached by Mick Giordano.

The Bonnies have never won the Atlantic 10 Men's Soccer Tournament, the Atlantic-10 regular season, nor have ever qualified for the NCAA Division I Men's Soccer Championship. Their best regular season performance was their third-place finish in 1999. Their best Atlantic 10 Tournament performances came in 1999 and 2009, where the Bonnies reached the semifinal.

== Rivalries ==
The Bonnies primary rival is the Siena Saints, whom they compete with for the Franciscan Cup.

== Seasons ==
National champions †	Conference champions *	Division champions ‡	NCAA Tournament berth ^

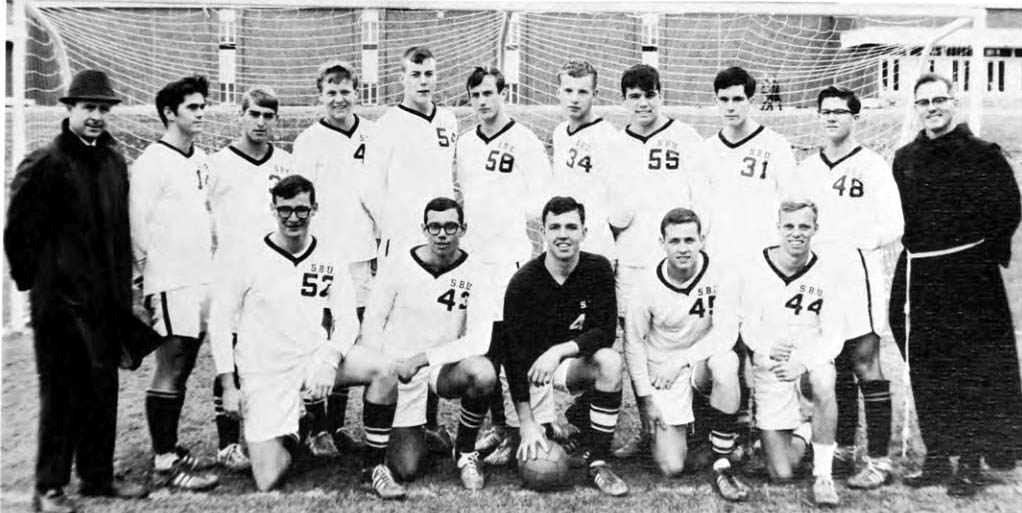
1967 freshman team

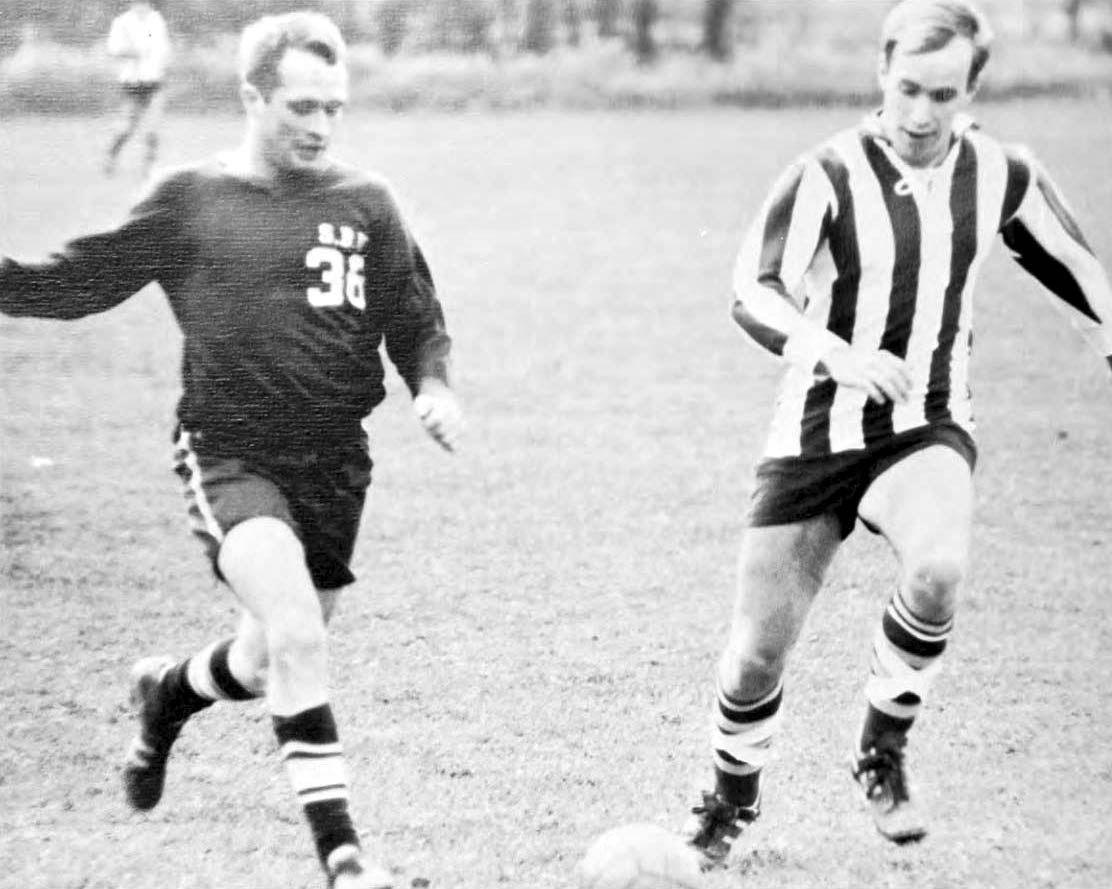
A match in 1967

Season	Head coach	Conference	Season results							Tournament results	
Season	Head coach	Conference	Overall			Conference				Conference	NCAA
Season	Head coach	Conference	W	L	T	W	L	T	Finish	Conference	NCAA
1961	Paul Morrotte	Independent	2	3	0	—	—	—	—	—	—
1962	Paul Morrotte	Independent	no team								
1963	Paul Morrotte	Independent	2	7	1	—	—	—	—	—	—
1964	Paul Morrotte	Independent	3	7	0	—	—	—	—	—	—
1965	Paul Morrotte	Independent	5	6	1	—	—	—	—	—	—
1966	Paul Morrotte	Independent	6	4	0	—	—	—	—	—	—
1967	Paul Morrotte	Independent	3	6	0	—	—	—	—	—	—
1968	Paul Morrotte	Independent	3	7	0	—	—	—	—	—	—
1969	Paul Morrotte	Independent	5	6	1	—	—	—	—	—	—
1970	Paul Morrotte	Independent	7	4	1	—	—	—	—	—	—
1971	Paul Morrotte	Independent	4	8	1	—	—	—	—	—	—
1972	Enrique Barrera	Independent	3	9	1	—	—	—	—	—	—
1973	Enrique Barrera	Independent	2	7	4	—	—	—	—	—	—
1974	Enrique Barrera	Independent	4	7	2	—	—	—	—	—	—
1975	Enrique Barrera	Independent	2	10	1	—	—	—	—	—	—
1976	Enrique Barrera	Independent	3	10	0	—	—	—	—	—	—
1977	Enrique Barrera	Independent	3	10	0	—	—	—	—	—	—
1978	Enrique Barrera	Independent	4	8	1	—	—	—	—	—	—
1979	Enrique Barrera	Independent	7	8	0	—	—	—	—	—	—
1980	Enrique Barrera	Independent	4	8	2	—	—	—	—	—	—
1981	Enrique Barrera	Independent	7	7	2	—	—	—	—	—	—
1982	Enrique Barrera	Independent	12	6	1	—	—	—	—	—	—
1983	Enrique Barrera	Independent	9	8	1	—	—	—	—	—	—
1984	Enrique Barrera	Independent	11	10	0	—	—	—	—	—	—
1985	Enrique Barrera	Independent	11	5	6	—	—	—	—	—	—
1986	Enrique Barrera	Independent	10	10	1	—	—	—	—	—	—
1987	Enrique Barrera	A-10	5	13	2	0	3	0	4th, West	—	—
1988	Enrique Barrera	A-10	6	13	1	1	2	0	4th, West	—	—
1989	George Perry III	A-10	6	11	0	0	3	0	4th, West	—	—
1990	George Perry III	A-10	1	16	0	0	8	0	9th	—	—
1991	George Perry III	A-10	4	11	0	1	6	0	7th	—	—
1992	George Perry III	A-10	6	11	1	1	6	0	8th	—	—
1993	George Perry III	A-10	5	13	0	0	7	0	8th	—	—
1994	George Perry III	A-10	2	17	0	1	6	0	7th	—	—
1995	Bob Butehorn	A-10	7	9	1	3	6	1	9th	—	—
1996	Bob Butehorn	A-10	5	11	2	3	7	1	8th	—	—
1997	Bob Butehorn	A-10	12	6	0	7	4	0	5th	—	—
1998	Bob Butehorn	A-10	10	6	1	7	4	0	5th	—	—
1999	Bill Brady	A-10	10	10	0	8	3	0	3rd	Semifinal	—
2000	Bill Brady	A-10	6	12	0	4	6	0	6th	—	—
2001	Bill Brady	A-10	6	12	0	2	9	0	12th	—	—
2002	Bill Brady	A-10	8	10	0	3	8	0	11th	—	—
2003	Bill Brady	A-10	2	16	1	1	10	0	12th	—	—
2004	Bill Brady	A-10	8	9	1	4	7	0	8th	—	—
2005	Mel Mahler	A-10	4	11	3	3	5	1	10th	—	—
2006	Mel Mahler	A-10	3	12	2	3	4	2	8th	—	—
2007	Mel Mahler	A-10	6	7	3	3	4	2	11th	—	—
2008	Mel Mahler	A-10	6	6	4	4	4	1	9th	—	—
2009	Mel Mahler	A-10	10	9	0	5	4	0	6th	Semifinal	—
2010	Mel Mahler	A-10	10	8	1	5	3	1	4th	First Round	—
2011	Mel Mahler	A-10	4	12	3	0	7	2	14th	—	—
2012	Mel Mahler	A-10	5	14	0	3	6	0	11th	—	—
2013	Mel Mahler	A-10	8	9	2	2	5	1	10th	—	—
2014	Mel Mahler	A-10	1	15	0	0	8	0	13th	—	—
2015	Kwame Oduro	A-10	2	16	1	1	7	0	13th	—	—
2016	Kwame Oduro	A-10	4	12	2	3	4	1	10th	—	—
2017	Kwame Oduro	A-10	8	9	2	2	5	1	7th	First Round	—
2018	Kwame Oduro	A-10	7	9	1	3	5	0	10th	—	—
2019	Kwame Oduro	A-10	5	11	0	1	7	0	12th	—	—
2020	Kwame Oduro	A-10	4	4	1	1	4	1	4th (West)	—	—
2021	Kwame Oduro	A-10	4	10	1	3	5	0	11th	—	—
2022	Kwame Oduro	A-10	3	10	3	0	6	2	14th	—	—
2023	Kwame Oduro	A-10	6	7	4	2	5	1	11th	—	—
2024	Kwame Oduro	A-10	6	8	3	2	4	2	10th	—	—
2025	Mick Giordano	A-10	—	—	—	—	—	—	—	—	—

== Individual achievements ==
=== Top scorers ===
Brad Wolf is St. Bonaventure's all-time points leader, while Joe Trabold is St. Bonaventure's all time goalscoring leader. Both players' careers overlapped during the 1984 and 1985 seasons.

Rank	Individual	Years	Goals	Assists	Points
1	Brad Wolf	1982-85	48	21	117
2	Joe Trabold	1984-86	50	16	116
3	Peter Carr	1980-83	34	6	74
4	Tom Lemmon	1996-99	27	9	63
5	Tom Zeifang	1984-86	26	10	62
6	Sam Maheu	2006-09	23	14	60
7	David Servello	1995-98	26	7	59
8	Emmett O'Connor	2010 - 13	17	24	58
9	John Phoumanny	1999-02	21	13	55
10	Dan Hetrick	1995-98	16	11	43

== Facilities ==
=== Marra Athletics Complex ===
Tom 80' and Michelle Marra Athletics Field Complex is a multisport complex with a 200-seat soccer-specific stadium that hosts both the men's and women's soccer programs. The Bonnies began playing at the facility in 2014. Previously St. Bonaventure played at McGraw-Jennings Field.

== Coaching history ==
St. Bonaventure University has had seven head coaches in their program's existence.

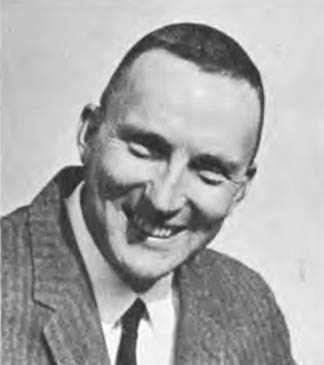
John Skehan, the first coach of St. Bonaventure

Years	Coach	Games	W	L	T	Pct.
1961–1971	John Skehan	-	-	-	-	.000
1972–1988	Enrique Barrera	-	-	-	-	.000
1989–1994	George Perry III	-	-	-	-	.000
1995–1998	Bob Butehorn	70	34	32	4	.514
1999–2004	Bill Brady	111	40	69	2	.369
2005–2014	Mel Mahler	178	57	102	19	.377
2015–	Kwame Oduro	37	6	28	3	.203
