= George Washington Revolutionaries men's soccer =

American college soccer team

- Founded: 1967; 59 years ago
- University: George Washington University
- Head coach: Craig Jones (12th season)
- Conference: A-10
- Location: Washington, District of Columbia
- Stadium: Mount Vernon Athletic Field (Capacity: 300)
- Nickname: Revolutionaries
- Colors: Buff and blue
Home	Away

NCAA Tournament Round of 16
- 1989

NCAA Tournament appearances
- 1989, 2002, 2004

Conference Tournament championships
- 2002, 2004

Conference Regular Season championships
- 1992, 2011, 2015

The George Washington Revolutionaries men's soccer team is a varsity intercollegiate athletic team of George Washington University in Washington, D.C., United States. The team is a member of the Atlantic 10 Conference, which is part of the National Collegiate Athletic Association's Division I. George Washington's first men's soccer team was fielded in 1967. The team plays its home games at Mount Vernon Athletic Field in Washington, D.C. The Revolutionaries are coached by Craig Jones.

Among the program's major titles, the Revolutionaries have collected two A10 Championships in 2002 and 2004 and 3 Regular Season A10 titles in 1992, 2011 and 2015. The Revolutionaries have made it to the NCAA Tournament 3 times, including the Round of 16 in 1989. The team has won the DC College Cup twice in 2007 and 2008. The cup is a competition between four Washington metropolitan area universities including George Mason, Georgetown, American, and Howard.

== Coaching ==
George Lidster coached GW for 24 years and is the winningest coach in the team's history and has amassed 201 wins to this point. A native of England, Lidster began his career playing professionally in Europe for Newcastle United F.C. and later Darlington F.C. He has played with former US National team players including John Kerr Jr. and Bruce Murray. Before GW he was assistant coach at nearby George Mason University. He has been named A10 Coach of the year three times in 1989, 1992, and 2011. He will be succeeded by Assistant Coach and former GW player and captain Craig Jones at the start of 2012 season.

During the 2015 season, Head Coach Craig Jones was named A10 Coach of the Year as his squad won the A10 Regular Season Title on the final game day in overtime away at St. Louis, but lost in the first round of the A10 tournament.

== 2011 season ==
2011 Season: The 2011 season saw one of GW's most successful teams in the history of the program as the team won the regular season championship finishing 7–2 in conference play, including a 5–0 record at home conceding 0 goals. The team ended its regular season in dramatic fashion capturing its first A10 regular season title in nearly 20 years with a 1–0 victory against Duquesne University in front of nearly 1,000 fans. George Lidster also earned his 200th win in the final regular season game, which saw the team capture the title and a second place bid into the A10 Tournament. The team finished second to Xavier in the tournament.

== Players ==
=== Current squad ===
As of December 17, 2024

Note: Flags indicate national team as defined under FIFA eligibility rules; some limited exceptions apply. Players may hold more than one non-FIFA nationality.

No.	Pos.	Nation	Player
0	GK	USA	Duncan Wegner
00	GK	USA	Richard Raupp
1	GK	ENG	Tom Macauley
2	DF	USA	Lucas Matuszewski
3	MF	USA	Sean Vaghedi
4	MF	GER	William Turner
5	DF	USA	Jared DeMott
6	MF	SUI	Roee Tenne
7	FW	ENG	Alex Nicholson
8	FW	USA	Jaden Dubon
10	MF	WAL	Finn Roberts
11	MF	ENG	Louis Saville
12	DF	USA	Jake Poole
14	DF	ENG	Louis Crofts
15	DF	USA	John Matlock

No.	Pos.	Nation	Player
16	FW	KOR	Alex Chung
17	DF	CHI	Santiago Labarca
18	DF	ISL	Joe Liebe
19	DF	USA	Mark Nakamura
20	MF	USA	Nico Medina
21	DF	SUI	Zain Ibrahim
22	DF	USA	Colin Prendergast
23	MF	USA	Dan Dobrin
24	DF	USA	Jake Hobbs
25	MF	USA	Pat Altamirano
26	MF	USA	Carter Humm
27	MF	ESP	Yago Torres
28	MF	USA	Ben Hissrich
30	GK	USA	JP Martin

== Honors ==
- A10 Coach of the Year
  - Craig Jones: 2015
- Atlantic 10 Conference
  - Winners (Tournament) (2): 2002, 2004
  - Winners (Regular Season) (3): 1992, 2011, 2015
- D.C. College Cup
  - Winners (2): 2006, 2007
