= 2016 Atlantic 10 Conference men's soccer season =

- League: NCAA Division I
- Sport: Soccer
- Duration: August, 2016 – November, 2016
- Teams: 13

2017 MLS SuperDraft
- Top draft pick: Lalas Abubakar, Dayton
- Picked by: Columbus Crew SC, 5th overall

Regular season
- Season champions: Saint Louis
- Runners-up: Fordham
- Season MVP: Offensive: János Löbe; Midfielder: Garrett Heine; Defensive: Lalas Abubaker

Tournament
- Champions: Fordham
- Runners-up: VCU
- Finals MVP: János Löbe

A-10 men's soccer seasons
- ← 2015 2017 →

2016 Atlantic 10 Conference men's soccer standings
	Conf.					Overall
Team	W		L		T	W		L		T
Saint Louis	6	–	2	–	0	7	–	8	–	3
Fordham ‡	5	–	2	–	1	10	–	7	–	4
LaSalle	5	–	3	–	0	10	–	8	–	1
UMass	4	–	2	–	2	7	–	9	–	3
VCU	4	–	3	–	1	8	–	9	–	4
Rhode Island	4	–	4	–	0	8	–	11	–	1
Duquesne	3	–	2	–	3	8	–	5	–	5
Dayton	3	–	3	–	2	7	–	9	–	3
George Washington	3	–	3	–	2	8	–	5	–	5
St. Bonaventure	3	–	4	–	1	4	–	12	–	2
Saint Joseph's	3	–	5	–	0	6	–	11	–	1
Davidson	2	–	5	–	1	4	–	12	–	1
George Mason	0	–	7	–	1	2	–	12	–	2
‡- 2016 Atlantic 10 Tournament +- Invited to the NCAA Division I Men's Soccer Championship; As of 18 November 2016; Rankings from NSCAA

The 2016 Atlantic 10 Conference men's soccer season was the 30th season of men's varsity soccer in the conference.

The George Washington Colonials and Dayton Flyers are the defending regular season and tournament champions, respectively. The Saint Louis Billikens won the regular season and the Fordham Rams won the tournament.

== Changes from 2015 ==
- On July 28, 2016, Rob Irvine was hired as the head coach for La Salle.

== Teams ==
=== Stadia and locations ===
Team	Location	Stadium	Capacity
Dayton Flyers	Dayton, Ohio	Baujan Field	2,000
Duquesne Dukes	Pittsburgh, Pennsylvania	Rooney Field	2,200
Fordham Rams	Bronx, New York	Coffey Field	8,000
George Mason Patriots	Fairfax, Virginia	George Mason Stadium	5,000
George Washington Colonials	Washington, D.C.	Mount Vernon Athletic Complex	1,000
La Salle Explorers	Philadelphia, Pennsylvania	McCarthy Stadium	7,500
UMass Minutemen	Amherst, Massachusetts	Rudd Field	800
Rhode Island Rams	Kingston, Rhode Island	URI Soccer Complex	1,547
St. Bonaventure Bonnies	St. Bonaventure, New York	McGraw-Jennings Field	2,000
Saint Joseph's Hawks	Philadelphia, Pennsylvania	Finnesey Field	600
Saint Louis Billikens	St. Louis, Missouri	Hermann Stadium	6,050
VCU Rams	Richmond, Virginia	Sports Backers Stadium	3,250

- Richmond does not sponsor men's soccer

=== Personnel ===
Team	Head coach	Captain	Shirt supplier
Dayton Flyers	(United States) Dennis Currier	TBA	(United States) Nike
Duquesne Dukes	(United States) Chase Brooks	TBA	(United States) Nike
Fordham Rams	(United States) Jim McElderry	TBA	(United States) Nike
George Mason Patriots	(United States) Greg Andrulis	TBA	(Germany) Adidas
George Washington Colonials	(Wales) Craig Jones	TBA	(United States) Nike
La Salle Explorers	(United States) Rob Irvine	TBA	(United States) Nike
UMass Minutemen	(United States) Sam Koch	TBA	(Germany) Adidas
Rhode Island Rams	(Northern Ireland) Gareth Elliott	TBA	(Germany) Adidas
St. Bonaventure Bonnies	(Ghana) Kwame Oduro	TBA	(Italy) Diadora
Saint Joseph's Hawks	(United States) Don D'Ambra	TBA	(United States) Nike
Saint Louis Billikens	(United States) Mike McGinty	TBA	(United States) Nike
VCU Rams	(United States) David Giffard	TBA	(United States) Nike

== Regular season ==
=== Results ===
Legend
Win
Lose
Tie

Home/Away	DVD	DAY	DUQ	FOR	GMU	GWU	LAS	UMA	URI	STL	STJ	STB	VCU
Davidson Wildcats													10/29
Dayton Flyers													
Duquesne Dukes													10/15
Fordham Rams													
George Mason Patriots													
George Washington Colonials													2–2
La Salle Explorers													
UMass Minutemen													10/22
Rhode Island Rams													
Saint Louis Billikens													^{[A]}
St. Joseph's Hawks													
St. Bonaventure Bonnies													
VCU Rams					2–0		10/12				10/19		

=== Rankings ===
Legend
Increase in ranking
Decrease in ranking
Not ranked previous week

		Pre	Wk 1	Wk 2	Wk 3	Wk 4	Wk 5	Wk 6	Wk 7	Wk 8	Wk 9	Wk 10	Wk 11	Wk 12	Final
Davidson	C														
Dayton	C	RV	NR												
Duquesne	C														
Fordham	C														
George Mason	C														
George Washington	C														
La Salle	C														
UMass	C														
Rhode Island	C														
Saint Louis	C		RV	RV	NR										
St. Joseph's	C														
St. Bonaventure	C														
VCU	C	RV	NR												

=== Honors and awards ===
Player of the Week

== Postseason ==
=== A10 tournament ===
Quarterfinals; Thursday, November 10
1	Saint Louis	1
8	Dayton	2
4	UMass	1
5	VCU	2
2	Fordham	4
7	Duquesne	0
3	La Salle	1
6	Rhode Island	3

Semifinals; Friday, November 11
8	Dayton	0
5	VCU	1
2	Fordham	4
6	Rhode Island	0

Championship; Sunday, November 13
5	VCU	0 (2)
2	Fordham (pen.)	0 (3)

=== NCAA tournament ===
Seed	Region	School	1st round	2nd round	3rd round	Quarterfinals	Semifinals	Championship
—	3	Fordham	L, 0–1 vs. Boston College – (Boston)					

== All-A10 awards and teams ==
2016 A10 Men's Soccer Individual Awards
Award	Recipient(s)
Offensive Player of the Year	János Löbe, Fordham
Coach of the Year	Mike McGinty, Saint Louis
Midfielder of the Year	Garrett Heine, George Washington
Defensive Player of the Year	Lalas Abubakar, Dayton
Freshman of the Year	Stavros Zarokostas, Rhode Island

2016 A10 Men's Soccer All-Conference Teams
First Team	Second Team	Rookie Team
Maxi Pragnell (F) - Davidson; Kennedy Nwabia (F) - Dayton; János Löbe (F) - Fordham; Luc Fatton (F) - VCU; Jannik Loebe (M) - Fordham; Garrett Heine (M) – George Washington; Rafael Andrade Santos (M) - VCU; Lalas Abubakar (D) - Dayton; Colman Kennedy (D) - La Salle; Dakota Barnathan (D) - VCU; Jorge Becerra (GK) – Massachusetts	Matt Robinson (F) - La Salle; Joe Saad (F)- Saint Louis; Jorge Herranz (F)- VCU; Stavros Zarokostas (M) - Rhode Island; Matt Crawford (M) - Saint Joseph's; Bliss Harris (M)- Saint Joseph's; Max Karcher (M) - Saint Louis; Matthew Lewis (D)- Fordham; Tobi Adewole (D) – George Washington; Joss Jess (D) – Massachusetts; Rashid Nuhu (GK) - Fordham	Federico Barrios, Dayton; Rok Taneski, Dayton; Ryan Landry, Duquesne; Joergen Oland, Fordham; Tunde Akinlosotu, George Mason; Pat McCarthy, La Salle; Konrad Gorich, Massachusetts; Peder Kristiansen, Rhode Island; Stavros Zarokostas, Rhode Island; Paul Nana Afful, St. Bonaventure; Saadiq Mohammed, Saint Louis; Quayyum Murana, Saint Louis

== See also ==
- 2016 NCAA Division I men's soccer season
- 2016 Atlantic 10 Men's Soccer Tournament
- 2016 Atlantic 10 Conference women's soccer season

== Notes ==
A : St. Louis hosted VCU on Sept. 20, 2016. The match ended in a 1–1 draw, but did not count as a conference match.
