= 2018 Atlantic 10 Conference men's soccer season =

- League: NCAA Division I
- Sport: Soccer
- Duration: August 24, 2018 – November 11, 2018
- Teams: 13

2019 MLS SuperDraft
- Top draft pick: Siad Haji, VCU
- Picked by: San Jose Earthquakes, 2nd overall

Regular Season
- Season champions: VCU
- Runners-up: Davidson
- Season MVP: FW: János Löbe; MF: Siad Haji; DF: Jørgen Oland
- Top scorer: Leon Maric, 12

Tournament
- Champions: Rhode Island
- Runners-up: George Mason

A-10 men's soccer seasons
- ← 2017 2019 →

2018 Atlantic 10 Conference men's soccer standings
	Conf.					Overall
Team	W		L		T	W		L		T
VCU	6	–	1	–	1	10	–	6	–	2
Davidson	5	–	2	–	1	9	–	7	–	2
Rhode Island ‡	5	–	3	–	0	15	–	5	–	0
George Mason	5	–	3	–	0	9	–	8	–	0
Saint Louis	3	–	1	–	4	6	–	4	–	7
Fordham	4	–	3	–	1	8	–	5	–	4
Dayton	4	–	3	–	1	9	–	6	–	4
Saint Joseph's	2	–	3	–	3	8	–	7	–	3
UMass	3	–	5	–	0	7	–	8	–	3
St. Bonaventure	3	–	5	–	0	7	–	9	–	1
Duquesne	2	–	4	–	2	4	–	9	–	3
George Washington	1	–	5	–	2	5	–	9	–	3
LaSalle	0	–	5	–	2	3	–	11	–	3
‡ – 2018 Atlantic 10 Tournament champion + – Invited to the 2018 NCAA Division I Men's Soccer Championship; As of December 11, 2018; Rankings from United Soccer Coaches

The 2018 Atlantic 10 Conference men's soccer season was the 32nd season of varsity soccer in the conference. The regular season began on August 24 and concluded on November 11, 2018. Following the regular season, the 2018 Atlantic 10 Men's Soccer Tournament was held to determine the conference champion and automatic berth into the 2018 NCAA Division I Men's Soccer Tournament.

UMass enters the season as the defending regular season and tournament champions. The Minutemen finished eighth in the regular season and were eliminated in the quarterfinals of the A-10 Tournament by VCU. VCU won the regular season championship, giving the Rams their first A-10 regular season title, and their first regular season championship overall since 2004. Rhode Island won the tournament, given them their first A-10 tournament title since 2006.

Rhode Island at the A-10 Tournament champions, earned the conference's automatic berth into the NCAA Tournament. They were the only berth the A-10 sent to the NCAA Tournament. There they were defeated by their rivals, Connecticut, 3–4.

== Preseason ==
=== Recruiting ===
National rankings
Team	CSN	TDS	Total signees
Davidson			
Dayton			
Duquesne			
Fordham			
George Mason			
George Washington			
La Salle			
UMass			
Rhode Island			
St. Bonaventure			
Saint Joseph's			
Saint Louis			
VCU			

=== Preseason poll ===
The preseason poll will be released on August 21, 2018. Fordham was picked to win the regular season.

	Team ranking	First-place votes	Raw points
1.	Fordham	6	158
2.	VCU	4	149
3.	UMass	2	144
4.	Rhode Island	0	124
5.	Dayton	1	117
6.	Saint Louis	0	106
7.	George Washington	0	102
8.	Davidson	0	67
9.	George Mason	0	49
10.	La Salle	0	46
11.	St. Bonaventure	0	43
12.	Saint Joseph's	0	39
13.	Duquesne	0	37

=== Preseason national polls ===
Three of the programs were ranked in one of the five major preseason polls. CollegeSoccerNews.com and Hero Sports use a Top 30 ranking throughout the season, while United Soccer, Soccer America, and TopDrawer Soccer use a Top 25 ranking throughout the season.

	United; Soccer	CSN	Hero; Sports	Soccer; America	TopDrawer; Soccer
Davidson	NR	NR	NR	NR	NR
Dayton	NR	NR	NR	NR	NR
Duquesne	NR	NR	NR	NR	NR
Fordham	16	16	30	24	NR
George Mason	NR	NR	NR	NR	NR
George Washington	NR	NR	NR	NR	NR
La Salle	NR	NR	NR	NR	NR
Rhode Island	NR	NR	NR	NR	NR
Saint Joseph's	NR	NR	NR	NR	NR
Saint Louis	NR	NR	NR	NR	NR
St. Bonaventure	NR	NR	NR	NR	NR
UMass	NR	NR	23	NR	NR
VCU	NR	NR	19	NR	NR

=== Preseason All-Conference Team ===
Pos.	Nat.	Player	Year	School
FW	GER	Janos Loebe	Sr.	Fordham
FW	USA	Davis Smith	So.	UMass
FW	BER	Chae Brangman	Sr.	Rhode Island
MF	SVN	Rok Taneski	Jr.	Dayton
MF	SOM	Siad Haji	Jr.	VCU
MF	GER	Dominik Richter	Sr.	Rhode Island
DF	NOR	Joergen Oland	Jr.	Fordham
DF	GER	Konrad Gorich	Sr.	UMass
DF	GER	Lennart Hein	Sr.	Saint Louis
DF	NOR	Peder Kristiansen	Jr.	Rhode Island
GK	GHA	Rashid Nuhu	Sr.	Rhode Island

== Head coaches ==
School	Coach	Year
Davidson	Matt Spear	19th
Dayton	Dennis Currier	14th
Duquesne	Chase Brooks	6th
Fordham	Jim McElderry	16th
George Mason	Greg Andrulis	14th
George Washington	Craig Jones	6th
La Salle	Rob Irvine	3rd
Rhode Island	Gareth Elliott	6th
Saint Joseph's	Don D'Ambra	9th
Saint Louis	Kevin Kalish	1st
St. Bonaventure	Kwame Oduro	4th
UMass	Fran O'Leary	4th
VCU	Dave Giffard	9th

== Regular season ==
Index to colors and formatting
A10 member won
A10 member lost
A10 member tied
A10 teams in **bold**

All times Eastern time.† denotes Homecoming game

=== Week 1 (Aug. 20–26) ===
Date	Time (ET)	Visiting team	Home team	Site	TV	Result	Attendance
August 24	4:00 PM	Hofstra	**Dayton**	Jesse Owens Memorial Stadium • Columbus, OH		**T** 2–2^{2OT}	268
August 24	4:00 PM	Stony Brook	**George Washington**	Mount Vernon Athletic Field • Washington, DC		**W** 3–2	277
August 24	5:00 PM	**George Mason**	American	Reeves Field • Washington, DC		**L** 1–2	532
August 24	5:00 PM	**Saint Louis**	Notre Dame	Alumni Stadium • Notre Dame, IN		**T** 1–1^{2OT}	1,079
August 24	5:00 PM	Georgia Southern	**VCU**	Sports Backers Stadium • Richmond, VA	WTVR	**L** 0–2	728
August 24	7:00 PM	**Duquesne**	Marshall	Veterans Memorial Soccer Complex • Huntington, WV		**L** 0–1	724
August 24	7:00 PM	**#16 Fordham**	Holy Cross	Linda Smith Stadium • Worcester, MA		**W** 2–1	318
August 24	7:00 PM	**Rhode Island**	Boston University	Nickerson Field • Boston, MA		**W** 2–0	202
August 24	7:00 PM	**Saint Joseph's**	William & Mary	Albert-Daly Field • Williamsburg, VA		**L** 0–2	454
August 24	7:00 PM	**UMass**	UMass Lowell	Cushing Field Complex • Lowell, MA		**L** 0–1	463
August 24	7:30 PM	**St. Bonaventure**	#6 Louisville	Lynn Stadium • Louisville, KY	ACCN+	**L** 1–2	1,601
August 26	12:00 PM	**Dayton**	Furman	Jesse Owens Memorial Stadium • Columbus, OH		**W** 1–0	237
August 26	2:00 PM	Robert Morris	**St. Bonaventure**	Marra Athletics Complex • Olean, NY		**T** 0–0^{2OT}	327
August 26	5:00 PM	Radford	**VCU**	Sports Backers Stadium • Richmond, VA		**W** 3–0	630
August 26	6:00 PM	Memphis	**Saint Louis**	Hermann Stadium • St. Louis, MO		**L** 1–2	663

Players of the week:

Offensive		Defensive		Rookie	
Player	Team	Player	Team	Player	Team
Oscar Haynes Brown	George Washington	Dan Miklos	Fordham	Roger Penske	Rhode Island

=== Week 2 (Aug. 27 – Sep. 2) ===
Date	Time (ET)	Visiting team	Home team	Site	TV	Result	Attendance
August 27	3:00 PM	**UMass**	Sacred Heart	Campus Field • Fairfield, CT		**T** 1–1^{2OT}	103
August 27	4:00 PM	American	**George Washington**	Mount Vernon Athletic Field • Washington, DC		**W** 6–0	377
August 27	7:00 PM	**Rhode Island**	Bryant	Bulldog Stadium • Smithfield, RI		**W** 4–0	147
August 27	7:00 PM	High Point	**Davidson**	Alumni Soccer Stadium • Davidson, NC	ESPN+	**L** 1–2	784
August 28	4:00 PM	**Saint Joseph's**	Saint Peter's	Joseph J. Jaroschak Field • Jersey City, NJ	SPUTV	**W** 3–1	228
August 28	7:00 PM	Howard	**La Salle**	McCarthy Stadium • Philadelphia, PA		**W** 2–1	115
August 31	4:00 PM	Saint Peter's	**UMass**	Rudd Field • Amherst, MA		**W** 2–1	311
August 31	5:00 PM	Milwaukee	**Dayton**	Baujan Field • Dayton, OH		**W** 2–0	617
August 31	7:00 PM	Northern Kentucky	**Duquesne**	Rooney Field • Pittsburgh, PA	ESPN+	**L** 1–2^{OT}	218
August 31	7:00 PM	Drexel	**George Mason**	George Mason Stadium • Fairfax, VA	ESPN+	**L** 0–3	468
August 31	7:00 PM	Penn State	**Rhode Island**	URI Soccer Complex • Kingston, RI	ESPN+	**W** 1–0	2,001
August 31	7:00 PM	Temple	**VCU**	Sports Backers Stadium • Richmond, VA		**W** 1–0	392
August 31	8:00 PM	**Saint Louis**	Louisville	Lynn Stadium • Louisville, KY		**Cancelled**^{[a]}	
September 1	3:00 PM	**La Salle**	Iona	Mazzella Field • New Rochelle, NY	ESPN+	**W** 2–1	245
September 1	4:00 PM	Lehigh	**George Washington**	Mount Vernon Athletic Field • Washington, DC		**L** 0–1	478
September 1	7:00 PM	Quinnipiac	**Saint Joseph's**	Sweeney Field • Philadelphia, PA	ESPN+	**W** 4–2	361
September 1	7:00 PM	**Davidson**	UNC Greensboro	UNCG Soccer Stadium • Greensboro, NC	SCDN	**W** 1–0	158
September 1	8:00 PM	**#15 Fordham**	#12 Wisconsin	Dan McClimon Stadium • Madison, WI	BTN	**W** 1–0^{2OT}	562
September 2	3:00 PM	Detroit Mercy	**Duquesne**	Rooney Field • Pittsburgh, PA	ESPN+	**W** 3–0	243
September 2	7:00 PM	Santa Clara	**VCU**	Sports Backers Stadium • Richmond, VA		**W** 1–0^{OT}	353

Players of the week:

Offensive		Defensive		Rookie	
Player	Team	Player	Team	Player	Team
Siad Haji	VCU	Federico Barrios; Rashid Nuhu	Dayton; Fordham	Roger Penske	Rhode Island

=== Week 3 (Sep. 3–9) ===
Date	Time (ET)	Visiting team	Home team	Site	TV	Result	Attendance
September 3	1:00 PM	**St. Bonaventure**	Albany	Bob Ford Field • Albany, NY		**W** 1–0	853
September 3	1:00 PM	**#11 Fordham**	Northwestern	Dan McClimon Stadium • Madison, WI		**W** 3–2 ^{OT}	50
September 3	4:00 PM	Bryant	**UMass**	Rudd Field • Amherst, MA	ESPN+	**W** 3–0	292
September 3	7:00 PM	Marshall	**Dayton**	Baujan Field • Dayton, OH		**T** 0–0 ^{2OT}	317
September 4	7:00 PM	Furman	**Davidson**	Alumni Soccer Stadium • Davidson, NC	ESPN+	**W** 1–0	478
September 4	8:00 PM	Marquette	**Saint Louis**	Hermann Stadium • St. Louis, MO		**W** 3–1	502
September 5	7:00 PM	St. Francis Brooklyn	**La Salle**	McCarthy Stadium • Philadelphia, PA	ESPN+	**L** 0–2	104
September 5	7:00 PM	Holy Cross	**Rhode Island**	URI Soccer Complex • Kingston, RI	ESPN+	**W** 3–0	2,028
September 5	7:00 PM	**Saint Joseph's**	Stony Brook	Kenneth P. LaValle Stadium • Stony Brook, NY	StretchTV	**L** 1–2	340
September 7	7:00 PM	**UMass**	Boston University	Nickerson Field • Boston, MA		**L** 2–3	226
September 7	7:00 PM	**George Washington**	Brown	Stevenson Field • Providence, RI		**L** 1–2 ^{OT}	681
September 7	7:00 PM	**VCU**	#4 Indiana	Bill Armstrong Stadium • Bloomington, IN	BTN	**L** 0–5	2,130
September 8^{[b]}	1:00 PM	Gardner–Webb	**George Mason**	George Mason Stadium • Fairfax, VA	ESPN+	**W** 5–4 ^{OT}	446
September 8	2:00 PM	**Dayton**	Western Illinois	MacKenzie Alumni Field • Macomb, IL		**L** 0–1	112
September 8	4:00 PM	**#11 Fordham**	Bryant	Bryant Track and Turf Complex • Smithfield, RI		**T** 1–1 ^{2OT}	277
September 8	7:00 PM	**Davidson**	Campbell	Eakes Athletics Complex • Buies Creek, NC	ESPN+	**L** 0–1	244
September 8	7:00 PM	Rider	**La Salle**	McCarthy Stadium • Philadelphia, PA		**L** 0–1	101
September 8	7:00 PM	**Rhode Island**	Marist	Leonidoff Field • Poughkeepsie, NY		**W** 2–0	573
September 8	7:00 PM	Sacred Heart	**Saint Joseph's**	Sweeney Field • Philadelphia, PA	ESPN+	**W** 4–1	0
September 8	8:00 PM	SMU	**Saint Louis**	Hermann Stadium • St. Louis, MO		**T** 1–1 ^{2OT}	543
September 9	1:00 PM	Clemson	**UMass**	Rudd Field • Amherst, MA	ESPN+	**T** 0–0 ^{2OT}	505
September 9	1:00 PM	**George Washington**	Providence	Anderson Stadium • Providence, RI		**L** 0–1	536
September 9	2:00 PM	Mount St. Mary's	**George Mason**	George Mason Stadium • Fairfax, VA	ESPN+	**Postponed**^{[c]}	

Players of the week:

Offensive		Defensive		Rookie	
Player	Team	Player	Team	Player	Team
Joergen Oland	Fordham	Roger Penske	Rhode Island	James McPherson	UMass

=== Week 4 (Sep. 10–16) ===
Date	Time (ET)	Visiting team	Home team	Site	TV	Result	Attendance
September 11	7:00 PM	North Carolina	**Davidson**	Alumni Soccer Stadium • Davidson, NC	ESPN+	**L** 0–1	815
September 11	7:00 PM	**Rhode Island**	Connecticut	Morrone Stadium • Storrs, CT		**Postponed**	
September 11	7:00 PM	**Dayton**	East Tennessee State	Summers-Taylor Stadium • Johnson City, TN		**W** 2–0	376
September 11	7:00 PM	Navy	**Saint Joseph's**	Sweeney Field • Philadelphia, PA	ESPN+	**W** 2–0	210
September 11	8:00 PM	**Saint Louis**	Tulsa	Hurricane Soccer & Track Stadium • Tulsa, OK		**W** 3–0	221
September 12	11:00 AM	Pittsburgh	**VCU**	Sports Backers Stadium • Richmond, VA		**L** 0–1	360
September 12	7:00 PM	Saint Francis (PA)	**Duquesne**	Rooney Field • Pittsburgh, PA	ESPN+	**L** 0–1	231
September 12	7:00 PM	**UMass**	Hartford	Al-Marzook Field • West Hartford, CT		**W** 2–0	235
September 12	7:00 PM	**La Salle**	Lafayette	Mike Bourger Field • Easton, PA		**L** 0–2	257
September 12	7:00 PM	**#12 Fordham**	Marist	Leonidoff Field • Poughkeepsie, NY		**T** 1–1 ^{2OT}	105
September 15	1:00 PM	**La Salle**	Robert Morris	Joe Walton Stadium • Moon Township, PA		**L** 0–1	201
September 15	1:00 PM	Central Connecticut	**UMass**	Rudd Field • Amherst, MA	ESPN+	**W** 5–2	346
September 15	3:00 PM	**George Washington**	NJIT	J. Malcolm Simon Stadium • Newark, NJ		**W** 1–0	155
September 15	7:00 PM	Incarnate Word	**Dayton**	Baujan Field • Dayton, OH		**W** 2–0	237
September 15	7:00 PM	**Saint Joseph's**	Manhattan	Gaelic Park • Riverdale, NY		**L** 0–2	298
September 15	7:00 PM	Niagara	**St. Bonaventure**	Marra Athletics Complex • Olean, NY		**W** 1–0	225
September 16	2:00 PM	UNC Asheville	**Davidson**	Alumni Soccer Stadium • Davidson, NC	ESPN+	**W** 3–1	233
September 16	3:00 PM	**George Mason**	#21 Coastal Carolina	CCU Soccer Field • Conway, SC		**Postponed**^{[d]}	
September 16	6:00 PM	Central Arkansas	**Saint Louis**	Hermann Stadium • St. Louis, MO		**W** 2–1	467
September 16	7:00 PM	Temple	**Duquesne**	Rooney Field • Pittsburgh, PA	ESPN+	**T** 1–1 ^{2OT}	337

Players of the week:

Offensive		Defensive		Rookie	
Player	Team	Player	Team	Player	Team
Devin Boyce	Saint Louis	Thor Arne Höfs	George Washington	John Klein	Saint Louis

=== Week 5 (Sep. 17–23) ===
Date	Time (ET)	Visiting team	Home team	Site	TV	Result	Attendance
September 17	7:00 PM	Campbell	**George Mason**	George Mason Stadium • Fairfax, VA		**Cancelled**	
September 18	2:00 PM	Binghamton	**George Washington**	Mount Vernon Athletic Field • Washington, DC	ESPN+	**W** 3–2 ^{OT}	182
September 18	7:00 PM	UNC Asheville	**Davidson**	Alumni Soccer Stadium • Davidson, NC	ESPN+	**W** 3–1	233
September 18	7:00 PM	**Dayton**	Oakland	OU Soccer Field • Auburn Hills, MI		**T** 1–1 ^{2OT}	396
September 18	7:00 PM	**#25 Fordham**	Manhattan	Gaelic Park • New York City, NY		**L** 0–1	498
September 18	7:00 PM	**Rhode Island**	Providence	Anderson Stadium • Providence, RI		**W** 3–0	2,106
September 19	4:00 PM	**La Salle**	Villanova	Higgins Soccer Complex • Villanova, PA		**L** 2–3	479
September 19	6:00 PM	Saint Francis (PA)	**St. Bonaventure**	Marra Athletics Complex • Olean, NY		**L** 1–3	405
September 19	7:00 PM	Robert Morris	**Duquesne**	Rooney Field • Pittsburgh, PA	ESPN+	**W** 4–1	290
September 19	7:00 PM	VMI	**Saint Joseph's**	Sweeney Field • Philadelphia, PA	ESPN+	**W** 5–0	419
September 19	7:00 PM	#20 Old Dominion	**VCU**	Sports Backers Stadium • Richmond, VA	ESPN+	**W** 4–0	1,098
September 21	7:00 PM	Columbia	**#25 Fordham**	Jack Coffey Field • New York City, NY		**W** 1–0	585
September 21	7:00 PM	**George Mason**	Yale	Reese Stadium • New Haven, CT	ESPN+	**L** 1–2	954
September 22	1:00 PM	**La Salle**	LIU Brooklyn	LIU Field • Brooklyn, NY		**L** 1–2	109
September 22	1:00 PM	Dartmouth	**UMass**	Rudd Field • Amherst, MA	ESPN+	**L** 0–1 ^{2OT}	217
September 22	6:00 PM	**Davidson**	Winthrop	Eagle Field • Rock Hill, SC		**W** 2–1	0
September 22	7:00 PM	**St. Bonaventure**	Canisius	Demske Sports Complex • Buffalo, NY		**L** 0–4	410
September 22	7:00 PM	West Virginia	**Dayton**	Baujan Field • Dayton, OH		**L** 0–2	955
September 22	7:00 PM	**Saint Joseph's**	Fairfield	Lessing Field • Fairfield, CT	SSN	**W** 2–0	504
September 22	7:00 PM	**Duquesne**	Oakland	OU Soccer Field • Auburn Hills, MI		**L** 0–2	364
September 22	7:00 PM	Brown	**Rhode Island**	URI Soccer Complex • Kingston, RI		**L** 0–1 ^{2OT}	2,110
September 22	8:00 PM	SIU Edwardsville	**Saint Louis**	Hermann Stadium • St. Louis, MO		**T** 1–1 ^{2OT}	4,903

Players of the week:

Offensive		Defensive		Rookie	
Player	Team	Player	Team	Player	Team
Jared Greene	VCU	Mario Sequeira	VCU	Rob Dymond	Duquesne

=== Week 6 (Sep. 24–30) ===
Date	Time (ET)	Visiting team	Home team	Site	TV	Result	Attendance
September 25	4:00 PM	New Hampshire	**UMass**	Rudd Field • Amherst, MA	ESPN+	**Postponed**	
September 25	7:00 PM	**George Washington**	Duke	Koskinen Stadium • Durham, NC	ACCN	**T** 0–0 ^{2OT}	359
September 25	7:00 PM	Seton Hall	**#25 Fordham**	Jack Coffey Field • New York City, NY		**Cancelled**	
September 25	7:00 PM	**Davidson**	#1 Wake Forest	Spry Stadium • Winston-Salem, NC	ACCN	**L** 1–5	1,357
September 25	7:00 PM	**Duquesne**	#23 Wright State	Alumni Stadium • Dayton, OH		**L** 2–6	314
September 26	7:00 PM	Northern Kentucky	**Dayton**	Baujan Field • Dayton, OH		**Cancelled**	
September 26	7:00 PM	Longwood	**George Mason**	George Mason Stadium • Fairfax, VA	ESPN+	**W** 2–0	182
September 26	7:00 PM	Akron	**VCU**	Sports Backers Stadium • Richmond, VA		**L** 3–4 ^{OT}	682
September 29	1:00 PM	**St. Bonaventure**	**UMass**	Rudd Field • Amherst, MA		**SBU** 2–1	351
September 29	6:00 PM	**George Washington**	**Davidson**	Alumni Soccer Stadium • Davidson, NC	ESPN+	**DAV** 3–2 ^{OT}	648
September 29	7:00 PM	**Saint Louis**	**Dayton**	Baujan Field • Dayton, OH		**T** 2–2 ^{2OT}	864
September 29	7:00 PM	**Saint Joseph's**	**Duquesne**	Rooney Field • Pittsburgh, PA	ESPN+	**T** 2–2 ^{2OT}	192
September 29	7:00 PM	**Rhode Island**	**#25 Fordham**	Jack Coffey Field • New York City, NY	ESPN+	**FOR** 4–2	420
September 29	7:00 PM	Appalachian State	**George Mason**	George Mason Stadium • Fairfax, VA	ESPN+	**L** 0–3	893
September 29	7:00 PM	**VCU**	**La Salle**	McCarthy Stadium • Philadelphia, PA	ESPN+	**VCU** 2–0	145

Players of the week:

Offensive		Defensive		Rookie	
Player	Team	Player	Team	Player	Team
Janos Loebe	Fordham	Luke Iacobellis	St. Bonaventure	Joseph Boehm; Isaac Boamah	Saint Joseph's; St. Bonaventure

=== Week 7 (Oct. 1–7) ===
Date	Time (ET)	Visiting team	Home team	Site	TV	Result	Attendance
October 2	7:00 PM	Cleveland State	Duquesne	Rooney Field • Pittsburgh, PA	ESPN+	**Cancelled**	
October 2	7:00 PM	Stony Brook	#21 Fordham	Jack Coffey Field • New York City, NY		**T** 0–0 ^{2OT}	143
October 2	7:00 PM	**George Washington**	George Mason	George Mason Stadium • Fairfax, VA	ESPN+	**GMU** 3–0	406
October 3	7:00 PM	**Saint Louis**	Rhode Island	URI Soccer Complex • Kingston, RI	ESPN+	**URI** 3–1	318
October 3	7:00 PM	**La Salle**	Saint Joseph's	Sweeney Field • Philadelphia, PA	ESPN+	**T** 2–2 ^{2OT}	894
October 3	7:00 PM	**Dayton**	St. Bonaventure	Marra Athletics Complex • Olean, NY	ESPN+	**SBU** 1–0	378
October 3	7:00 PM	**UMass**	VCU	Sports Backers Stadium • Richmond, VA	ESPN+	**VCU** 2–0	539
October 6	12:00 PM	**#21 Fordham**	Saint Joseph's	Sweeney Field • Philadelphia, PA	ESPN+	**SJU** 3–2 ^{OT}	503
October 6	1:00 PM	**George Mason**	UMass	Rudd Field • Amherst, MA	ESPN+	**MASS** 2–0	211
October 6	7:00 PM	**Davidson**	Dayton	Baujan Field • Dayton, OH	ESPN+	**DAY** 1–0 ^{OT}	384
October 6	7:00 PM	**Rhode Island**	St. Bonaventure	Marra Athletics Complex • Olean, NY	ESPN+	**URI** 3–1	295
October 6	7:00 PM	**Duquesne**	VCU	Sports Backers Stadium • Richmond, VA	ESPN+	**VCU** 2–0	545
October 6	8:00 PM	**La Salle**	Saint Louis	Hermann Stadium • St. Louis, MO	ESPN+	**SLU** 4–2	682

Players of the week:

Offensive		Defensive		Rookie	
Player	Team	Player	Team	Player	Team
Siad Haji	VCU	Mario Sequeira	VCU	Henry Howell; Edvin Akselsen	Davidson; Rhode Island

=== Week 8 (Oct. 8–14) ===
Date	Time (ET)	Visiting team	Home team	Site	TV	Result	Attendance
October 10	2:00 PM	St. Bonaventure	George Washington	Mount Vernon Athletic Field • Washington, DC	ESPN+	**GWU** 4–0	251
October 10	7:00 PM	Saint Joseph's	Davidson	Alumni Soccer Stadium • Davidson, NC	ESPN+	**DAV** 6–2	225
October 10	7:00 PM	Fordham	Duquesne	Rooney Field • Pittsburgh, PA	ESPN+	**FOR** 2–1 ^{OT}	128
October 10	7:00 PM	George Mason	La Salle	McCarthy Stadium • Philadelphia, PA	ESPN+	**GMU** 3–0	110
October 10	7:00 PM	UMass	Rhode Island	URI Soccer Complex • Kingston, RI		**URI** 3–2	1,010
October 10	8:00 PM	VCU	Saint Louis	Hermann Stadium • St. Louis, MO		**T** 0–0 ^{2OT}	508
October 13	2:00 PM	VCU	George Washington	Mount Vernon Athletic Field • Washington, DC		**VCU** 2–0	321
October 13	7:00 PM	UMass	Fordham	Jack Coffey Field • New York City, NY	ESPN+	**MASS** 1–0	158
October 13	7:00 PM	Duquesne	George Mason	George Mason Stadium • Fairfax, VA	ESPN+	**DUQ** 3–0	478
October 13	7:00 PM	Davidson	La Salle	McCarthy Stadium • Philadelphia, PA		**T** 1–1 ^{2OT}	135
October 13	7:00 PM	Dayton	Rhode Island	URI Soccer Complex • Kingston, RI		**URI** 3–1	1,028
October 13	7:00 PM	Saint Louis	St. Bonaventure	Marra Athletics Complex • Olean, NY	ESPN+	**SLU** 2–1	368

Players of the week:

Offensive		Defensive		Rookie	
Player	Team	Player	Team	Player	Team
DeAndrae Brown	UMass	Mario Sequeira	VCU	Edvin Akselsen; Lucas Hauth	Rhode Island; Davidson

=== Week 9 (Oct. 15–21) ===
Date	Time (ET)	Visiting team	Home team	Site	TV	Result	Attendance
October 16	7:00 PM	St. Bonaventure	#24 Syracuse	SU Soccer Stadium • Syracuse, NY		**L** 0–7	727
October 17	3:00 PM	Davidson	**UMass**	Rudd Field • Amherst, MA	ESPN+	**DAV** 2–0	197
October 17	8:00 PM	Duquesne	**Saint Louis**	Hermann Stadium • St. Louis, MO	ESPN+	**T** 0–0 ^{2OT}	483
October 17	7:00 PM	La Salle	**Dayton**	Baujan Field • Dayton, OH		**DAY** 2–0	215
October 17	7:00 PM	George Washington	**Fordham**	Jack Coffey Field • New York City, NY		**T** 0–0 ^{2OT}	202
October 17	7:00 PM	Saint Joseph's	**George Mason**	George Mason Stadium • Fairfax, VA	ESPN+	**GMU** 4–3	96
October 20	1:00 PM	Dayton	**UMass**	Rudd Field • Amherst, MA	ESPN+	**DAY** 2–1	411
October 20	2:00 PM	La Salle	**George Washington**	Mount Vernon Athletic Field • Washington, DC	ESPN+	**T** 1–1 ^{2OT}	236
October 20	6:00 PM	Fordham	**Davidson**	Alumni Soccer Stadium • Davidson, NC	ESPN+	**FOR** 2–0	431
October 20	7:00 PM	#23 Rhode Island	**Duquesne**	Rooney Field • Pittsburgh, PA	ESPN+	**DUQ** 3–1	264
October 20	7:00 PM	St. Bonaventure	**Saint Joseph's**	Sweeney Field • Philadelphia, PA	ESPN+	**SJU** 3–0	405
October 20	7:00 PM	George Mason	**VCU**	Sports Backers Stadium • Richmond, VA	ESPN+	**VCU** 2–0	485

Players of the week:

Offensive		Defensive		Rookie	
Player	Team	Player	Team	Player	Team
Noah Mehta	Duquesne	Robbie McKelvey	Duquesne	Brett Werner	La Salle

=== Week 10 (Oct. 22–28) ===
Date	Time (ET)	Visiting team	Home team	Site	TV	Result	Attendance
October 23	6:00 PM	**La Salle**	NJIT	J. Malcolm Simon Stadium • Newark, NJ		**W** 2–1	306
October 23	7:00 PM	#18 Virginia Tech	**Davidson**	Alumni Soccer Stadium • Davidson, NC	ACCN	**T** 2–2 ^{2OT}	302
October 23	7:00 PM	Boston College	**Rhode Island**	URI Soccer Complex • Kingston, RI		**W** 2–1	400
October 23	7:00 PM	**George Washington**	UMBC	Retriever Soccer Park • Baltimore, MD		**L** 1–3	1,985
October 23	9:00 PM	**Saint Louis**	#11 Denver	CIBER Field • Denver, CO		**L** 1–2	438
October 24	7:00 PM	**Saint Joseph's**	Drexel	Vidas Field • Philadelphia, PA		**L** 3–4	318
October 24	7:00 PM	Howard	**St. Bonaventure**	Marra Athletics Complex • Olean, NY		**W** 2–0	101
October 27	6:00 PM	**George Mason**	**Davidson**	Alumni Soccer Stadium • Davidson, NC	ESPN+	**GMU** 1–0	402
October 27	7:00 PM	**VCU**	**Dayton**	Baujan Field • Dayton, OH		**DAY** 1–0	485
October 27	7:00 PM	**Fordham**	**La Salle**	McCarthy Stadium • Philadelphia, PA	ESPN+	**FOR** 1–0	75
October 27	7:00 PM	**Saint Joseph's**	**Rhode Island**	URI Soccer Complex • Kingston, RI	URITV	**URI** 2–1	128
October 27	7:00 PM	**Duquesne**	**St. Bonaventure**	Marra Athletics Complex • Olean, NY	ESPN+	**SBU** 3–2	115
October 27	8:00 PM	**George Washington**	**Saint Louis**	Hermann Stadium • St. Louis, MO		**SLU** 2–0	709

Players of the week:

Offensive		Defensive		Rookie	
Player	Team	Player	Team	Player	Team
Janos Loebe; Kosi Nwafornso	Fordham; St. Bonaventure	Clark Gronek	George Mason	Elias Harryson	Dayton

=== Week 11 (Oct. 29 – Nov. 4) ===
Date	Time (ET)	Visiting team	Home team	Site	TV	Result	Attendance
October 31	2:00 PM	UMass	George Washington	Mount Vernon Athletic Field • Washington, DC	ESPN+	**MASS** 3–1	189
October 31	7:00 PM	Davidson	Duquesne	Rooney Field • Pittsburgh, PA	ESPN+	**DAV** 1–0	101
October 31	7:00 PM	Dayton	Fordham	Jack Coffey Field • New York City, NY	ESPN+	**DAY** 2–0	154
October 31	7:00 PM	Rhode Island	George Mason	George Mason Stadium • Fairfax, VA	ESPN+	**GMU** 2–0	216
October 31	7:00 PM	Saint Louis	Saint Joseph's	Sweeney Field • Philadelphia, PA	ESPN+	**T** 3–3 ^{2OT}	467
October 31	7:00 PM	St. Bonaventure	VCU	Sports Backers Stadium • Richmond, VA	ESPN+	**VCU** 2–1	366

Players of the week:

Offensive		Defensive		Rookie	
Player	Team	Player	Team	Player	Team

== Rankings ==
=== United Soccer Coaches National ===
	Improvement in ranking
	Drop in ranking
RV	Received votes but were not ranked in Top 25
NV	No votes received

		Pre	Wk 1	Wk 2	Wk 3	Wk 4	Wk 5	Wk 6	Wk 7	Wk 8	Wk 9	Wk 10	Wk 11	Wk 12	Final
Davidson	C	NV	NV	NV	NV	NV	NV	NV	NV	NV	NV				
Dayton	C	NV	NV	NV	NV	NV	NV	NV	NV	NV	NV				
Duquesne	C	NV	NV	NV	NV	NV	NV	NV	NV	NV	NV				
Fordham	C	16	15	11	12	25	25	21	RV	RV	NV				
George Mason	C	NV	NV	NV	NV	NV	NV	NV	NV	NV	NV				
George Washington	C	NV	NV	NV	NV	NV	NV	NV	NV	NV	NV				
La Salle	C	NV	NV	NV	NV	NV	NV	NV	NV	NV	NV				
UMass	C	RV	NV	NV	NV	NV	NV	NV	NV	NV	NV				
Rhode Island	C	NV	NV	RV	RV	RV	RV	RV	RV	23	RV				
Saint Louis	C	NV	NV	NV	NV	NV	NV	RV	NV	RV	RV				
St. Joseph's	C	NV	NV	NV	NV	NV	NV	NV	NV	NV	NV				
St. Bonaventure	C	NV	NV	NV	NV	NV	NV	NV	NV	NV	NV				
VCU	C	RV	NV	NV	NV	NV	NV	NV	RV	RV	RV				

=== United Soccer Coaches Southeast Regional ===
	Improvement in ranking
	Drop in ranking
RV	Received votes but were not ranked in Top 10
NV	No votes received

		Wk 1	Wk 2	Wk 3	Wk 4	Wk 5	Wk 6	Wk 7	Wk 8	Wk 9	Wk 10	Wk 11	Wk 12
Davidson	C	NV	NV	NV	NV	NV	10	9	10	10			
Dayton	C	9	7	10	10	NV	NV	NV	NV	NV			
Duquesne	C	NV	NV	NV	NV	NV	NV	NV	NV	NV			
Fordham	C	1	1	2	4	3	2	5	7	7			
George Mason	C	NV	NV	NV	NV	NV	NV	NV	NV	NV			
George Washington	C	NV	NV	NV	NV	NV	NV	NV	NV	NV			
La Salle	C	NV	NV	NV	NV	NV	NV	NV	NV	NV			
UMass	C	NV	NV	9	8	NV	NV	NV	NV	NV			
Rhode Island	C	10	5	5	5	5	6	4	2	5			
Saint Louis	C	NV	NV	NV	9	8	5	8	5	6			
St. Joseph's	C	NV	NV	NV	NV	NV	NV	NV	NV	NV			
St. Bonaventure	C	NV	NV	NV	NV	NV	NV	NV	NV	NV			
VCU	C	NV	8	8	RV	7	8	6	3	2			

== Postseason ==
=== Atlantic 10 Tournament ===
Quarterfinals; Nov. 4
1	VCU (pen.)	1 (5)
8	UMass	1 (4)
4	Rhode Island	2
5	Fordham	0
2	Davidson	1
7	Dayton (2OT)	2
3	George Mason (2OT)	1
6	Saint Louis	0

Semifinals; Nov. 9
1	VCU	0
4	Rhode Island	1
7	Dayton	0
3	George Mason (OT)	1

Final; Nov. 11
4	Rhode Island	2
3	George Mason	0

=== NCAA Tournament ===
Seed	Region	School	1st Round	2nd Round	3rd Round	Quarterfinals	Semifinals	Championship
—	1	Rhode Island	L 3–4 ^{OT} at Connecticut – (Storrs)					

== Awards ==
=== Postseason awards ===
==== All A-10 awards and teams ====
2018 A10 Men's Soccer Individual Awards
Award	Recipient(s)
Offensive Player of the Year	Janos Loebe, Fordham
Coach of the Year	David Giffard, VCU
Midfielder of the Year	Siad Haji, VCU
Defensive Player of the Year	Jørgen Oland, Fordham
Freshman of the Year	John Klein, Saint Louis

2018 A10 Men's Soccer All-Conference Teams
First Team	Second Team	Rookie Team
Janos Loebe, Fordham; Leon Maric, Saint Joseph's; Oscar Haynes Brown, George Washington; Siad Haji, VCU; Dominik Richter, Rhode Island; Devin Boyce, Saint Louis; Lennart Hein, Saint Louis; Jordan Hill, Davidson; Joergen Oland, Fordham; Peder Kristiansen, Rhode Island; Rashid Nuhu, Fordham	Stavros Zarokostas, Rhode Island; John Klein, Saint Louis; Kosi Nwafornso, St. Bonaventure; DeAndrae Brown, Massachusetts; Jaylen Thompson, Davidson; Rok Taneski, Dayton; Edvin Akselsen, Rhode Island; Ulrik Edvardsen, VCU; Tyler Dickson, Rhode Island; Konrad Gorich, Massachusetts; Ryo Shimazaki, VCU; Mario Sequeira, VCU	Henry Howell, Davidson; Elias Harryson, Dayton; Manel Busquets, Duquesne; Sindri Ingimarsson, Fordham; Ato Williams, George Mason; Marcelo Lage, George Washington; Yosuke Hanya, Massachusetts; Edvin Akselsen, Rhode Island; Sondre Karterud, Rhode Island; Isaac Boamah, St. Bonaventure; John Klein, Saint Louis

==== All Americans ====
No players from the Atlantic 10 earned All-America honors.

== MLS SuperDraft ==
=== Total picks by school ===
Team	Round 1	Round 2	Round 3	Round 4	Total
Davidson	0	0	0	0	0
Dayton	0	0	0	0	0
Duquesne	0	0	0	0	0
Fordham	1	0	0	0	1
George Mason	0	0	0	0	0
George Washington	0	0	0	0	0
La Salle	0	0	0	0	0
UMass	0	0	0	0	0
Rhode Island	0	0	0	0	0
St. Bonaventure	0	0	0	0	0
Saint Joseph's	0	0	0	0	0
Saint Louis	0	1	0	0	1
VCU	1	0	0	0	1

=== List of selections ===
Round	Pick #	MLS team	Player	Position	College	Other
1	2	San Jose Earthquakes	Siad Haji	MF	VCU	
1	22	New York Red Bulls	Janos Loebe	FW	Fordham	
2	47	Portland Timbers	Lennart Hein	DF	Saint Louis	

=== Notable non-draft signees ===
The following are notable players who went pro following the end of the season that were not selected in the 2018 MLS SuperDraft.

Player	Position	College	Moving to	Ref.
Eli Lockaby	MF	VCU	Richmond Kickers	

== See also ==
- 2018 NCAA Division I men's soccer season
- 2018 Atlantic 10 Men's Soccer Tournament
- 2018 Atlantic 10 Conference women's soccer season

== Notes ==
^{^[a]}The game between Saint Louis and Louisville was cancelled due to inclement weather.
^{^[b]}The game between Gardner–Webb and George Mason was rescheduled from September 7 to September 8 due to lightning.
^{^[c]}The game between Mount St. Mary's and George Mason has been postponed due to the rescheduled matches on September 7 to September 8.
^{^[d]}The game between Coastal Carolina and George Mason has been postponed due to Hurricane Florence.
