= Atlantic 10 men's soccer tournament =

- Conference soccer championship
- Sport: College soccer
- Conference: Atlantic 10 Conference
- Number of teams: 8
- Format: Single-elimination
- Played: 1987–present
- Last contest: 2026
- Current champion: Saint Louis (6th title)
- Most championships: Rhode Island (8 titles)
- TV partner: ESPN+
- Official website: atlantic10.com/msocc

The Atlantic 10 Conference men's soccer tournament is the conference championship tournament in men's soccer for the Atlantic 10 Conference (A-10). The tournament has been held every year since 1987. It is a single-elimination tournament, and seeding is based on regular season records. The winner, declared conference champion, receives the conference's automatic bid to the NCAA men's soccer tournament.

Rhode Island is the most winning team of the tournament, with 8 conference titles.

== Champions ==
The following is a list of Atlantic 10 Conference Tournament winners:

=== Finals ===
Key

- (1) – Title number
- a.e.t. – Match went to extra time
- p – Match decided by a penalty shootout after extra time
- – Winning team reached College Cup
- – Winning team won regular season
- – Winning team won National Championship

Ed.	Year	Champion	Score	Runner-up	MVP	Venue	City
1	1987	Penn State (1)	1–0	Rutgers	Steve Frantz	Yurcak Field	Piscataway, NJ
2	1988	Penn State (2)	2–0	Rutgers	Steve Frantz	Yurcak Field	Piscataway, NJ
3	1989	Penn State (3)	2–1 (a.e.t.)	Rutgers	Danny Kelly	Jeffrey Field	State College, PA
4	1990	Rutgers (1)	3–1 (a.e.t.)	Penn State	Steve Rammel	Yurcak Field	Piscataway, NJ
5	1991	Rutgers (2)	6–0	Rhode Island	Lino DiCuollo	Meade Stadium	Kingston, RI
6	1992	West Virginia (1)	0–0 (4–3 p)	UMass	Mark Thienel	Yurcak Field	Piscataway, NJ
7	1993	Rutgers (3)	3–0	St. Joseph's	Pedro Lopes	Yurcak Field	Piscataway, NJ
8	1994	Rutgers (4)	4–3	UMass	Ian Checchio	Yurcak Field	Piscataway, NJ
9	1995	Rhode Island (1)	5–2	UMass	Andrew Williams	Meade Stadium	Kingston, RI
10	1996	Fordham (1)	2–1	Rhode Island	Jim Grandinetti	Baujan Field	Dayton, OH
11	1997	Dayton (1)	1–0	La Salle	Shawn Rockey	German Hungarian Club	Oakford, PA
12	1998	Dayton (2)	1–0 (a.e.t.)	Virginia Tech	Mark Schulte	URI Soccer Complex	Kingston, RI
13	1999	Rhode Island (2)	7–0	Duquesne	Nicholas McCreath	Baujan Field	Dayton, OH
14	2000	Rhode Island (3)	5–1	Dayton	Nicholas McCreath	URI Soccer Complex	Kingston, RI
15	2001	UMass (1)	0–0 (4–3 p)	Richmond	J.R. Pouncey	Baujan Field	Dayton, OH
16	2002	George Washington (1)	3–2	Duquesne	Arnar Johannsson	City Stadium	Richmond, VA
17	2003	Rhode Island (4)	3–1	Temple	Perek Belleh	City Stadium	Richmond, VA
18	2004	George Washington (2)	2–0	Temple	Derek Biss	Vernon Field	Washington, D.C.
19	2005	Rhode Island (5)	2–2 (5–4 p)	Saint Louis	Simon Gatti	Hermann Stadium	St. Louis, MO
20	2006	Rhode Island (6)	2–0	Saint Louis	Danleigh Borman	Transamerica Field	Charlotte, NC
21	2007	UMass (2)	2–0	Charlotte	Zack Simmons	Baujan Field	Dayton, OH
23	2008	Dayton (3)	1–0	UMass	Florian DeCamps	Rooney Field	Pittsburgh, PA
24	2009	Saint Louis (1)	2–0	Dayton	Mike Roach	URI Soccer Complex	Kingston, RI
25	2010	Xavier (1)	2–0	La Salle	Justin Marshall	Transamerica Field	Charlotte, NC
26	2011	Xavier (2)	2–1 (a.e.t.)	George Washington	Adar Cohen	Hermann Stadium	St. Louis, MO
27	2012	Saint Louis (2)	3–0	VCU	Kingsley Bryce	Transamerica Field	Charlotte, NC
28	2013	George Mason (1)	1–0	Saint Louis	Timi Mulgrew	Alter Stadium	Kettering, OH
29	2014	Fordham (2)	1–0	Rhode Island	János Löbe	Sports Backers Stadium	Richmond, VA
30	2015	Dayton (4)	4–1	VCU	Amass Amankona	George Mason Stadium	Fairfax, VA
31	2016	Fordham (3)	0–0 (3–2 p)	VCU	Rashid Nuhu	Alumni Soccer Stadium	Davidson, NC
32	2017	UMass (3)	3–1	VCU	Matthew Mooney	Baujan Field	Dayton, OH
33	2018	Rhode Island (7)	2–0	George Mason	Tyler Dickson	Hermann Stadium	St. Louis, MO
34	2019	Rhode Island (8)	1–0	Dayton	Ludvik Banco	Coffey Field	The Bronx, NY
35	2020	Fordham (4)	2–0	George Washington	Matt Sloan	Baujan Field	Dayton, OH
36	2021	Saint Louis (3)	2–1	Duquesne	Patrick Schulte	Hermann Stadium	St. Louis, MO
37	2022	Saint Louis (4)	0–0 (3–2 p)	Loyola-Chicago	Carlos Tofern	Hermann Stadium	St. Louis, MO
38	2023	Dayton (5)	2–1	VCU	Kenji Mboma Dem	Sports Backers Stadium	Richmond, VA
39	2024	Dayton (6)	3–0	Saint Louis	Hjalti Sigurdsson	Baujan Field	Dalton, OH
40	2025	Saint Louis (5)	1–1 (5–4 p)	Dayton	Jeremi Abonnel	Hermann Stadium	St. Louis, MO
41	2026	Saint Louis (6)	2–1	Fordham	Lucas McPartlin	Hermann Stadium	St. Louis, MO

=== By school ===
Team	Titles	Last won
Rhode Island	8	2019
Dayton	6	2024
Saint Louis	6	2026
Rutgers^{†}	4	1994
Fordham	4	2020
Penn State^{†}	3	1989
UMass^{†}	3	2017
George Washington	2	2004
Xavier^{†}	2	2011
George Mason	1	2013
West Virginia^{†}	1	1992
Butler^{†}	0	
Charlotte^{†}	0	
Davidson	0	
Duquesne	0	
East Carolina^{†}	0	
Fordham	0	
La Salle	0	
Loyola	0	
Richmond^{†}	0	
Saint Joseph's	0	
St. Bonaventure	0	
Temple^{†}	0	
VCU	0	
Virginia Tech^{†}	0	

- ^{†}Former member of the Atlantic 10

== Bibliography ==
- "Atlantic 10 Men's Soccer Record Book" (PDF). Atlantic 10 Conference. Atlantic10.com. pp. 1–11.
