= 2018 Atlantic 10 men's soccer tournament =

Tournament edition

- Classification: Division I
- Teams: 8
- Quarterfinals site: Higher seeds
- Semifinals site: Hermann Stadium; St. Louis, MO
- Finals site: Hermann Stadium; St. Louis, MO
- Champions: Rhode Island (7th title)
- Winning coach: Gareth Elliott (1st title)
- MVP: Tyler Dickson (Rhode Island)
- Broadcast: ESPN+

2018 Atlantic 10 Conference men's soccer standings
	Conf.					Overall
Team	W		L		T	W		L		T
VCU	6	–	1	–	1	10	–	6	–	2
Davidson	5	–	2	–	1	9	–	7	–	2
Rhode Island ‡	5	–	3	–	0	15	–	5	–	0
George Mason	5	–	3	–	0	9	–	8	–	0
Saint Louis	3	–	1	–	4	6	–	4	–	7
Fordham	4	–	3	–	1	8	–	5	–	4
Dayton	4	–	3	–	1	9	–	6	–	4
Saint Joseph's	2	–	3	–	3	8	–	7	–	3
UMass	3	–	5	–	0	7	–	8	–	3
St. Bonaventure	3	–	5	–	0	7	–	9	–	1
Duquesne	2	–	4	–	2	4	–	9	–	3
George Washington	1	–	5	–	2	5	–	9	–	3
LaSalle	0	–	5	–	2	3	–	11	–	3
‡ – 2018 Atlantic 10 Tournament champion + – Invited to the 2018 NCAA Division I Men's Soccer Championship; As of December 11, 2018; Rankings from United Soccer Coaches

The 2018 Atlantic 10 men's soccer tournament, was the 21st edition of the Atlantic 10 Men's Soccer Tournament. It will determined the Atlantic 10 Conference's automatic berth into the 2018 NCAA Division I Men's Soccer Championship. The tournament began on November 4 and concluded on November 11. Saint Louis University hosted the semifinals and championship matches with these fixtures contested at Hermann Stadium.

Rhode Island won the A-10 Tournament, giving the Rams their first Atlantic 10 Conference championship, as well as first NCAA berth since 2006. Rhode Island defeated George Mason in the final, and bested regular season champions, VCU, in the semifinals, and last year's NCAA quarterfinalists, Fordham in the quarterfinals. George Mason defeated Saint Louis and Dayton to reach the championship match.

Defending champions, UMass, were eliminated by the virtue of penalty kicks to VCU in the quarterfinal round.

Rhode Island was the only Atlantic 10 team this year to earn a berth into the NCAA Tournament. In the NCAA Tournament, they were eliminated in the first round by Connecticut off of a golden goal.

== Seeds ==
Seed	School	Conference	Tiebreaker
1	VCU	6–1–1	
2	Davidson	5–2–1	
3	George Mason	5–3–0	GMU 1–0 vs. URI
4	Rhode Island	5–3–0	URI 0–1 vs. GMU
5	Fordham	4–3–1	Win vs. Dayton
6	Saint Louis	3–1–4	Tie vs. Dayton
7	Dayton	4–3–1	0-1-1 vs tied teams
8	UMass	3–5–0	By virtue of a win over George Mason

== Bracket ==
Quarterfinals; Nov. 4
1	VCU (pen.)	1 (5)
8	UMass	1 (4)
4	Rhode Island	2
5	Fordham	0
2	Davidson	1
7	Dayton (2OT)	2
3	George Mason (2OT)	1
6	Saint Louis	0

Semifinals; Nov. 9
1	VCU	0
4	Rhode Island	1
7	Dayton	0
3	George Mason (OT)	1

Final; Nov. 11
4	Rhode Island	2
3	George Mason	0

== Results ==
=== Quarterfinals ===
November 4
1:00 p.m. EST

No. 2 Davidson	1–2 (a.e.t.)	No. 7 Dayton
Hauth 78'	Report	Taneski 90'; Harryson 110'

Alumni Soccer Stadium
Davidson, North Carolina
Attendance: 687
Referee: David Erbacher

November 4
1:00 p.m. EST

No. 4 Rhode Island	2–0	No. 5 Fordham
Zarokostas 27'; Dickson 72'	Report

URI Soccer Complex
Kingston, Rhode Island
Attendance: 928
Referee: David Breckner

November 4
2:00 p.m. EST

No. 1 VCU	1–1 (a.e.t.)	No. 8 UMass
Greene 17'	Report	Benhaddouche 53'
Penalties
Sewell (penalty scored); Edvardsen (penalty scored); Shimazaki (penalty scored); Pearson (penalty scored); Sequeira (penalty missed); Robinson (penalty scored)	5–4	(penalty scored) Benhaddouche; (penalty missed) Petrizzi; (penalty scored) Labeck; (penalty scored) Merklin; (penalty scored) Fulton; (penalty missed) O'Dwyer

Sports Backers Stadium
Richmond, Virginia
Attendance: 387
Referee: Peter Dihma

November 4
2:00 p.m. EST

No. 3 George Mason	1–0 (a.e.t.)	No. 6 Saint Louis
Pertusa 108'	Report

George Mason Stadium
Fairfax, Virginia
Attendance: 242
Referee: Sergio Gonzalez

=== Semifinals ===
November 9
2:00 PM EST

No. 1 VCU	0–1	No. 4 Rhode Island
	Report	Brangman 56'

Hermann Stadium, St. Louis, Missouri
Attendance: 0
Referee: Andrey Castel

November 9
4:30 PM EST

No. 3 George Mason	1–0 (a.e.t.)	No. 7 Dayton
Robinson 102'	Report

Hermann Stadium, St. Louis, Missouri
Attendance: 310
Referee: Charles Murphy

=== Final ===
November 11
12:00 PM EST

No. 3 George Mason	0–2	No. 4 Rhode Island
	Report	Richter 16'; Sunde 86'

Hermann Stadium, St. Louis, Missouri
Attendance: 223
Referee: Mike De Felice

== Statistics ==
=== Goalscorers ===
1 Goal

- (France) Clement Benhaddouche – UMass
- (Bermuda) Chae Brangman – Rhode Island
- (United States) Tyler Dickson – Rhode Island
- (United States) Jared Greene – VCU
- (Sweden) Elias Harryson – Dayton
- (United States) Lucas Hauth – Davidson
- (Spain) Pablo Pertusa – George Mason
- (Germany) Dominik Richter – Rhode Island
- (United States) Grant Robinson – George Mason
- (Norway) Emil Jesman Sunde – Rhode Island
- (Slovenia) Rok Taneski – Dayton
- (Greece) Stavros Zarokostas – Rhode Island

== Awards and honors ==
- Tournament MVP: Tyler Dickson, Rhode Island

All-Tournament team:

- Chae Brangman, Rhode Island
- Tyler Dickson, Rhode Island
- Clark Gronek, George Mason
- Elias Harryson, Dayton
- Dominik Richter, Rhode Island
- Grant Robinson, George Mason

- Roger Penske, Rhode Island
- Pablo Pertusa, George Mason
- Mario Sequeira, VCU
- Rok Taneski, Dayton
- Stavros Zarokostas, Rhode Island
