= 2016 Atlantic 10 men's soccer tournament =

- Classification: Division I
- Teams: 8
- Matches: 7
- Attendance: 1,578
- Site: Alumni Soccer Stadium; Davidson, North Carolina
- Champions: Fordham (2nd title)
- Winning coach: Jim McElderry (2nd title)
- MVP: Rashid Nuhu (Fordham)
- Broadcast: A10 Network

2016 Atlantic 10 Conference men's soccer standings
	Conf.					Overall
Team	W		L		T	W		L		T
Saint Louis	6	–	2	–	0	7	–	8	–	3
Fordham ‡	5	–	2	–	1	10	–	7	–	4
LaSalle	5	–	3	–	0	10	–	8	–	1
UMass	4	–	2	–	2	7	–	9	–	3
VCU	4	–	3	–	1	8	–	9	–	4
Rhode Island	4	–	4	–	0	8	–	11	–	1
Duquesne	3	–	2	–	3	8	–	5	–	5
Dayton	3	–	3	–	2	7	–	9	–	3
George Washington	3	–	3	–	2	8	–	5	–	5
St. Bonaventure	3	–	4	–	1	4	–	12	–	2
Saint Joseph's	3	–	5	–	0	6	–	11	–	1
Davidson	2	–	5	–	1	4	–	12	–	1
George Mason	0	–	7	–	1	2	–	12	–	2
‡- 2016 Atlantic 10 Tournament +- Invited to the NCAA Division I Men's Soccer Championship; As of 18 November 2016; Rankings from NSCAA

The 2016 Atlantic 10 Men's Soccer Tournament, known as the 2016 Atlantic 10 Men's Soccer Tournament Presented by Amtrak for sponsorship reasons, was the nineteenth edition of the tournament. It determined the Atlantic 10 Conference's automatic berth into the 2016 NCAA Division I Men's Soccer Championship. Dayton enter the tournament as the defending champions.

The Fordham Rams won the Atlantic 10 title, besting the VCU Rams, 3–2 in penalty kicks in the championship match. It was Fordham's first A-10 title since 2014. VCU previously made the A-10 final in 2012, and 2015, losing both times.

The tournament was hosted by Davidson College and all matches were contested at Alumni Soccer Stadium.

== Seeds ==
The top eight teams participate in the tournament. The seeding is based on the program's conference record during the 2016 Atlantic 10 Conference season.

Seed	School	Conference	Tiebreaker
1	Saint Louis	6–2	
2	Fordham	5–2–1	
3	La Salle	5–3	
4	UMass	4–2–2	
5	VCU	4–3–1	
6	Rhode Island	4–4	
7	Duquesne	3–2–3	
8	Dayton	3–3–2	

== Bracket ==
Quarterfinals; Thursday, November 10
1	Saint Louis	1
8	Dayton	2
4	UMass	1
5	VCU	2
2	Fordham	4
7	Duquesne	0
3	La Salle	1
6	Rhode Island	3

Semifinals; Friday, November 11
8	Dayton	0
5	VCU	1
2	Fordham	4
6	Rhode Island	0

Championship; Sunday, November 13
5	VCU	0 (2)
2	Fordham (pen.)	0 (3)

== Results ==
=== Quarterfinals ===
November 10
11:00 AM EST

Saint Louis Billikens	1–2 (a.e.t.)	Dayton Flyers
Richards 89'	Report	Hagenkord 78'; Navarro 96'

Alumni Soccer Stadium, Davidson, North Carolina
Attendance: 291
Referee: Jeffrey Muschik

November 10
2:00 PM EST

UMass Minutemen	1–2 (a.e.t.)	VCU Rams
DeSantis 20'	Report	Eaton 90'; Herranz 99'

Alumni Soccer Stadium, Davidson, North Carolina
Attendance: 291
Referee: Jeffrey Skinker

November 10
5:00 PM EST

Fordham Rams	4–0	Duquesne Dukes
Ohlendorf 64', 77', 80'; Löbe 74'	Report

Alumni Soccer Stadium, Davidson, North Carolina
Attendance: 291
Referee: Mark Kadlecik

November 10
8:00 PM EST

La Salle Explorers	1–3	Rhode Island Rams
Robinson 80'	Report	Bailey 37', 83'; Zarokostas 38'

Alumni Soccer Stadium, Davidson, North Carolina
Attendance: 291
Referee: Neil Barbulescu

=== Semifinals ===
November 11
5:00 PM EST

Dayton Flyers	0–1	VCU Rams
	Report	Barnathan 27'

Alumni Soccer Stadium, Davidson, North Carolina
Attendance: 138
Referee: Neil Barbulescu

November 11
8:00 PM EST

Fordham Rams	4–0	Rhode Island Rams
Sandnes 16', 84'; Loebe 74', 85'	Report

Alumni Soccer Stadium, Davidson, North Carolina
Attendance: 138
Referee: Jeffrey Skinker

=== Final ===
November 13
12:00 PM EST

Fordham Rams	0–0 (a.e.t.)	VCU Rams
	Report
Penalties
Jne. Löbe (penalty scored); Oland (penalty scored); Jnk. Löbe (penalty missed); Lewis (penalty scored)	3–2	(penalty scored) Dal Molin; (penalty missed) Barnathan; (penalty missed) Herranz; (penalty scored) Boehme; (penalty missed) Lockaby

Alumni Soccer Stadium, Davidson, North Carolina
Attendance: 138
Referee: Christopher Spivey
