= Atlantic 10 Conference Men's Soccer Player of the Year =

The Atlantic 10 Conference Men's Soccer Player of the Year are a series of three awards given out at the end of the college soccer season. Currently, the Atlantic-10 Conference gives out awards for the best offensive, defensive and midfielder of the year.

Notable winners of the award include Alexi Lalas, Peter Vermes and Geoff Cameron.

== Key ==
†	Co-Players of the Year
Division (X)	Indicates which division the soccer program is in; East or West
Player (X)	Denotes the number of times the player had been awarded the A-10 Player of the Year award at that point

== Winners ==
=== Player of the Year (1987–1999) ===
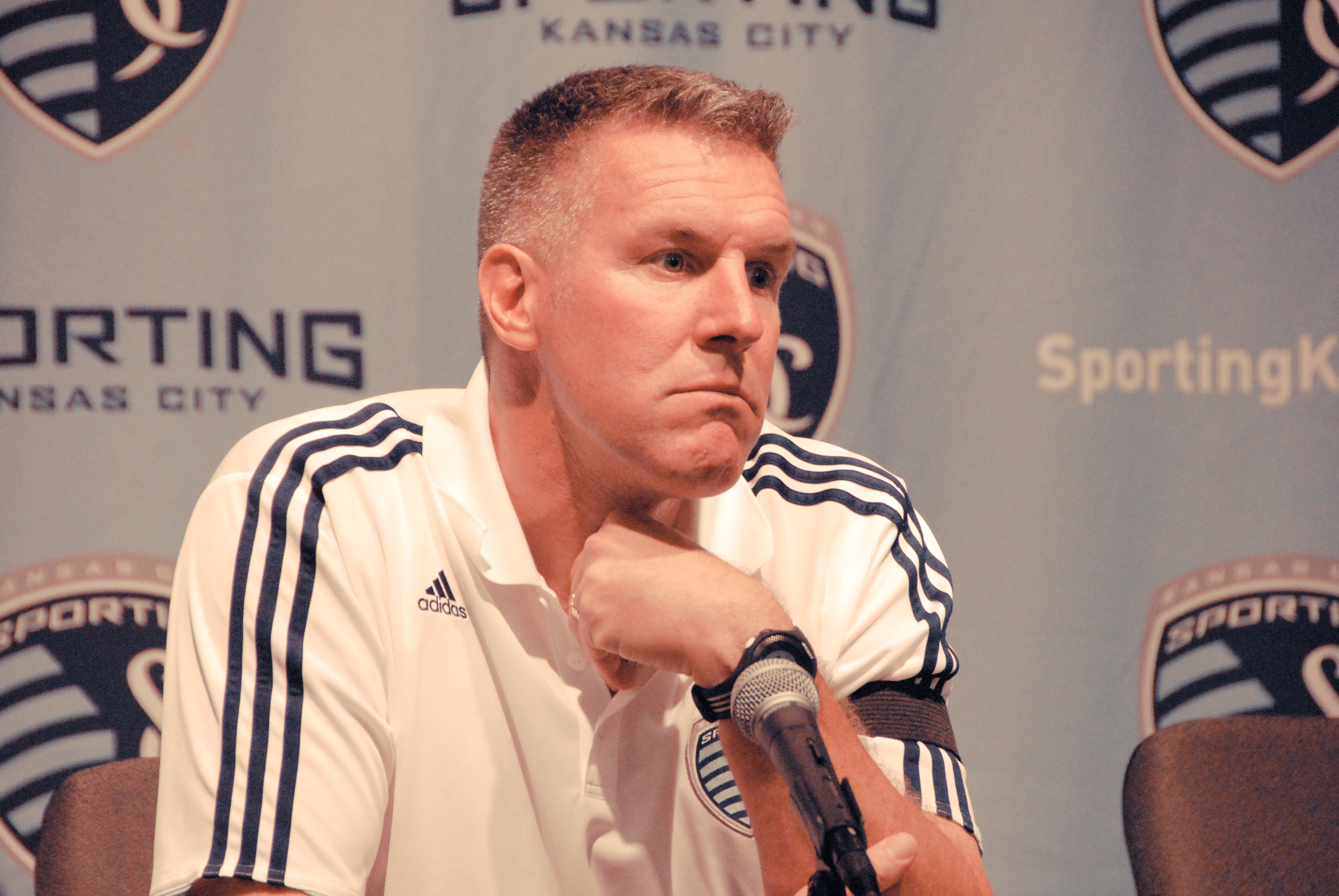
Peter Vermes won the first ever A-10 Player of the Year Award in 1987.

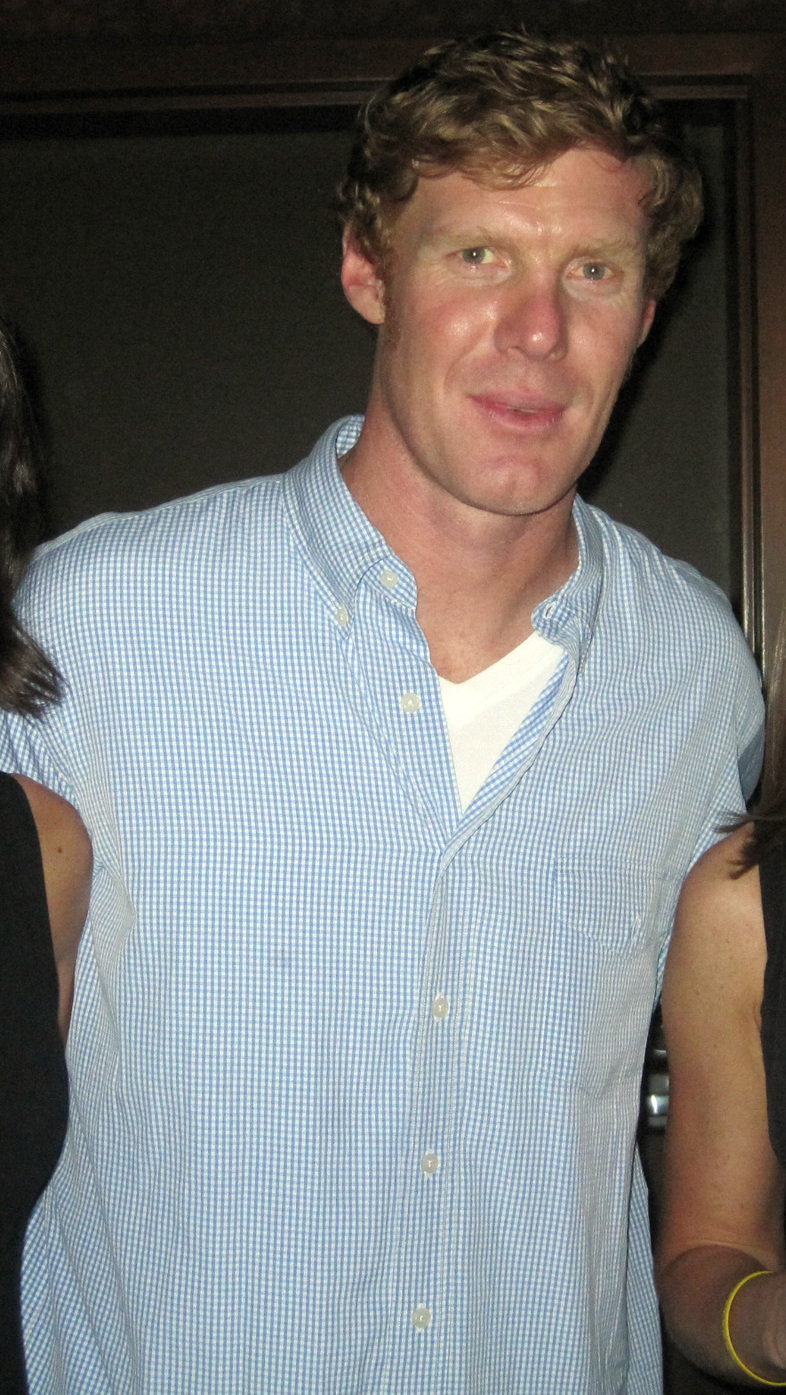
Alexi Lalas won the A-10 Player of the Year Award in 1989.

Season	Player	School	Position	Class	Reference
1987 (E)	Peter Vermes	Rutgers	Defender	Senior	
1987 (W)	Kenny Emson	George Washington	Midfielder	Junior	
1988 (E)	Lance Klima	Rhode Island	Goalkeeper	Senior	
1988 (W)	Jan Skorpen	Penn State	Forward	Junior	
1989 (E)	Lino DiCuollo; Alexi Lalas	Rutgers	Defender	Junior; Sophomore	
1989 (W)	Mario Lone	George Washington	Forward	Sophomore	
1990	Steve Rammel	Rutgers	Forward	Senior	
1991	Mario Lone (2)	George Washington	Forward	Senior	
1992	Marcelo Valencia	George Washington	Forward	Sophomore	
1993	Andrew Craig; Don D'Ambra	Temple; Saint Joseph's	Midfielder; Forward	Senior; Junior	
1994	Pedro Lopes	Rutgers	Defender	Senior	
1995	Cesidio Colasante	La Salle	Midfielder	Sophomore	
1996	Andrew Williams	Rhode Island	Midfielder	Junior	
1997	Cesidio Colasante (2)	La Salle	Midfielder	Senior	
1998	John Wolyniec	Fordham	Forward	Senior	
1999	Tom Lemmon	St. Bonaventure	Forward	Junior	

=== Offensive Player of the Year (2000–) ===
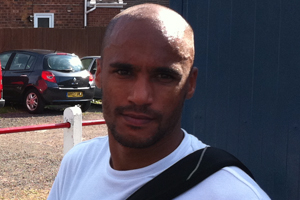
Kyle Patterson won the Offensive Player of the Year Award in 2007.

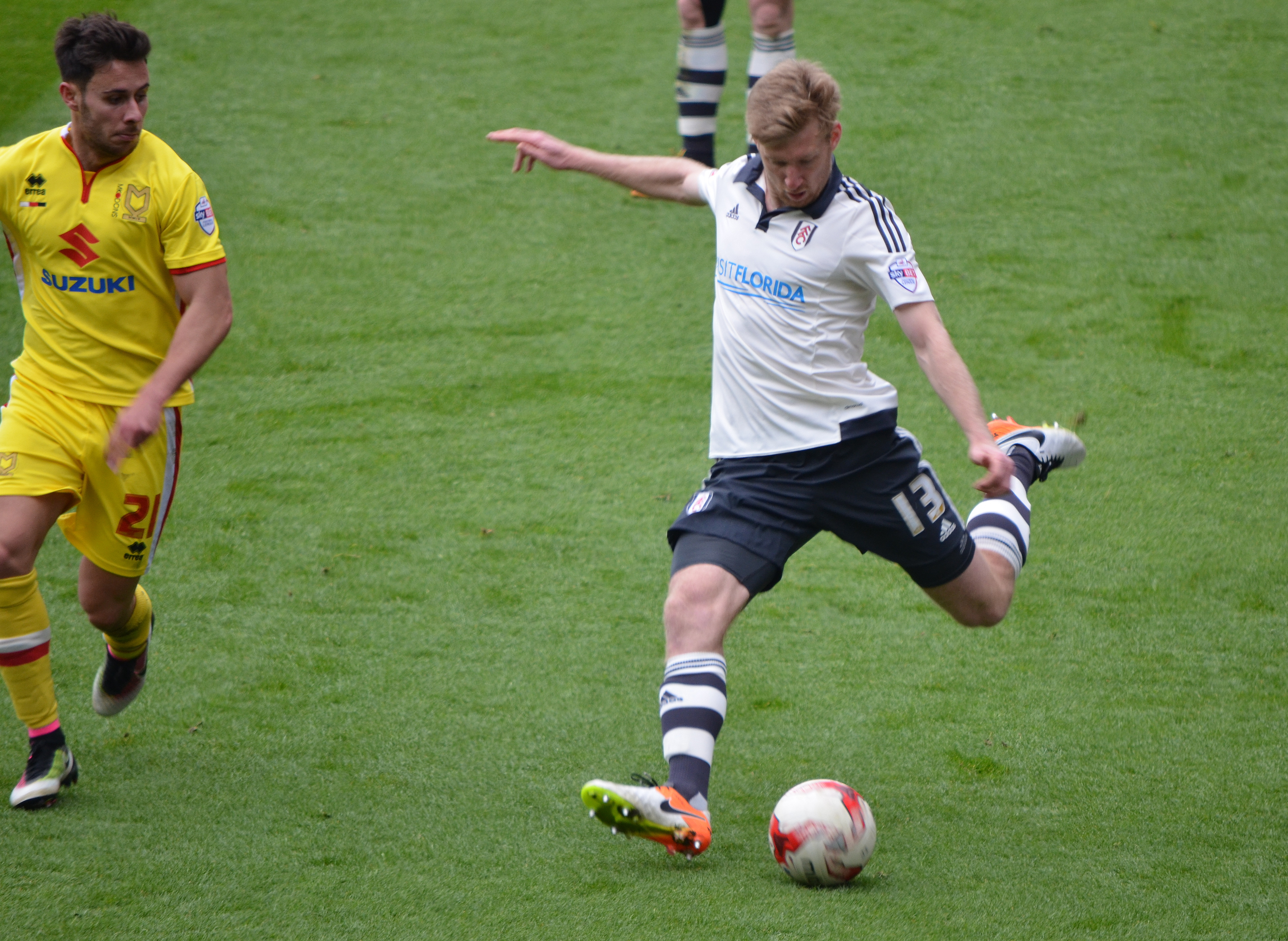
Tim Ream won the Defensive Player of the Year Award in 2009.

Season	Player	School	Position	Class	Reference
2000	R.J. Kaszuba	Dayton	Forward	Senior	
2001	Jeff Deren	UMass	Forward	Sophomore	
2002	Jeff Deren (2)	UMass	Forward	Junior	
2003	Damien Pottinger	Duquesne	Forward	Senior	
2004	Sasha Gotsmanov	Rhode Island	Forward	Senior	
2005	John DiRaimondo	Saint Louis	Midfielder	Junior	
2006	Jeffrey Gonsalves	Rhode Island	Forward	Senior	
2007	Kyle Patterson	Saint Louis	Midfielder	Junior	
2008	Chris Salvaggione	Charlotte	Midfielder	Senior	
2009	Sam Maheu	St. Bonaventure	Forward	Senior	
2010	Ryan Richter	La Salle	Midfielder	Senior	
2011	Joshua Patterson	Duquesne	Forward	Junior	
2012	Jason Johnson	VCU	Forward	Senior	
2013	Jason Plumhoff	La Salle	Forward	Senior	
2014	Robert Kristo	Saint Louis	Forward	Senior	
2015	Amass Amankona	Dayton	Midfielder	Senior	
2016	János Löbe	Fordham	Midfielder	Sophomore	
2017	Rafael Andrade Santos	VCU	Forward	Senior	
2018	János Löbe	Fordham	Midfielder	Senior	
2019	Jonas Fjeldberg	Dayton	Forward	Junior	
2020	Jonas Fjeldberg (2)	Dayton	Forward	Senior	
2021	Simon Becher	Saint Louis	Forward	Junior	
2022	Alec Hughes	UMass	Forward	Junior	
2022	John Klein III	Saint Louis	Forward	Senior	
2023	Alec Hughes (2)	UMass	Forward	Senior	
2024	Alec Hughes (3)	UMass	Forward	Graduate	
2025	Daniel D’Ippolito	Fordham	Midfielder	Senior	
2026	Cooper Lijewski	Dayton	Forward	Senior	

=== Defensive Player of the Year (2000–) ===
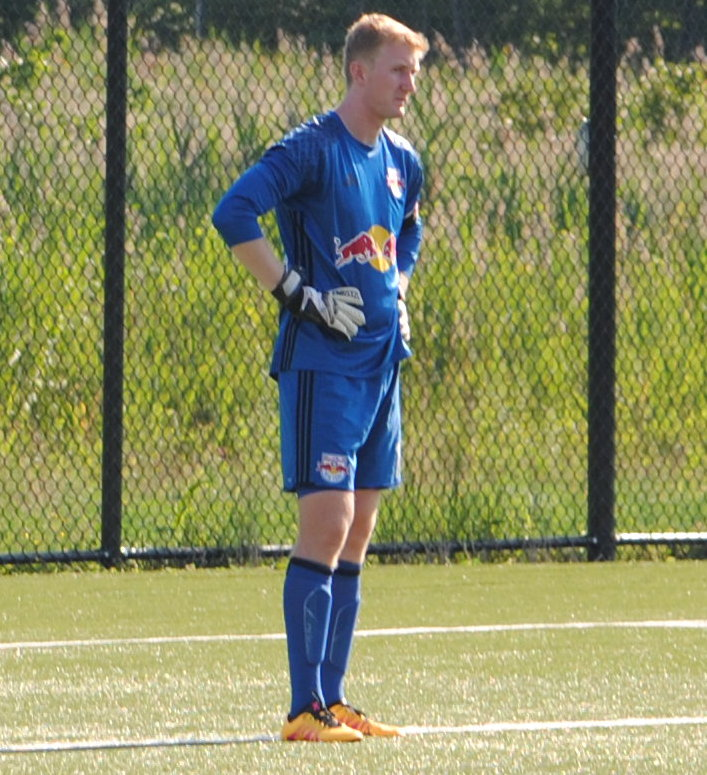
Ryan Meara won the Defensive Player of the Year Award in 2011.

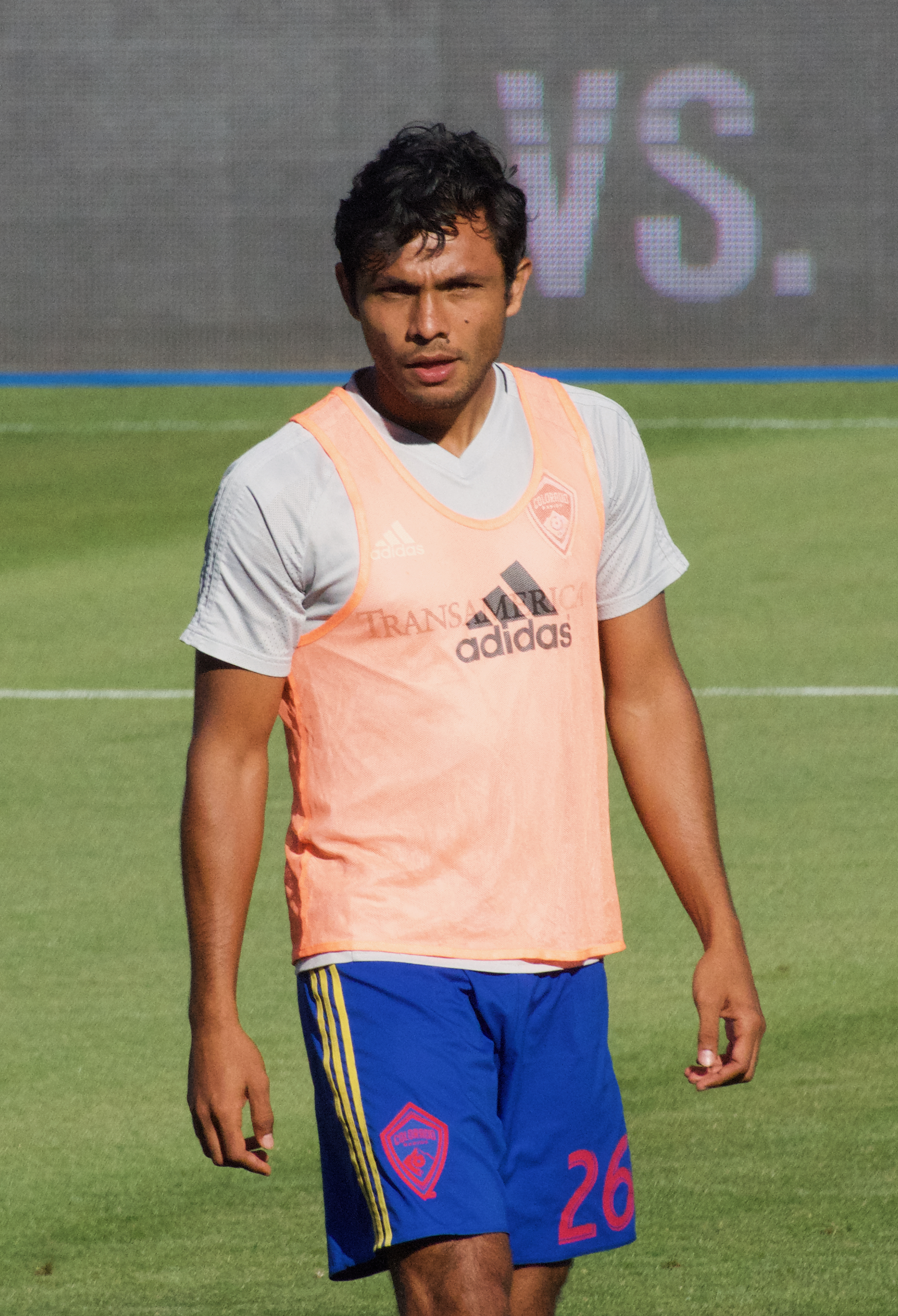
Dennis Castillo won the Defensive Player of the Year Award in 2015.

Season	Player	School	Position	Class	Reference
2000	Terry McNelis	Duquesne	Goalkeeper	Freshman	
2001	Shawn Alexander	Richmond	Goalkeeper	Senior	
2002	Stash Graham	La Salle	Goalkeeper	Senior	
2003	Patrick Hannigan	Temple	Goalkeeper	Junior	
2004	Patrick Hannigan (2)	Temple	Goalkeeper	Senior	
2005	Zach Varga	Duquesne	Goalkeeper	Junior	
2006	Eric Sciocchetti	Richmond	Goalkeeper	Junior	
2007	Calum Angus	Saint Louis	Defender	Junior	
2008	Zack Simmons	UMass	Goalkeeper	Senior	
2009	Tim Ream	Saint Louis	Defender	Senior	
2010	Charles Rodriguez	Charlotte	Defender	Junior	
2011	Ryan Meara	Fordham	Goalkeeper	Senior	
2012	Nick Hagglund	Xavier	Defender	Junior	
2013	Anthony Manning	Saint Louis	Defender	Junior	
2014	Anthony Manning (2)	Saint Louis	Defender	Senior	
2015	Dennis Castillo	VCU	Defender	Senior	
2016	Lalas Abubakar	Dayton	Defender	Senior	
2017	Matthew Lewis	Fordham	Defender	Senior	
2018	Jørgen Oland	Fordham	Defender	Junior	
2019	Jørgen Oland (2)	Fordham	Defender	Senior	
2020	Patrick Schulte	Saint Louis	Goalkeeper	Sophomore	
2021	Kipp Keller	Saint Louis	Defender	Sophomore	
2022	Alberto Suarez	Saint Louis	Defender	Senior	
2023	Diego Konincks	Saint Louis	Defender	Senior	
2024	Hjalti Sigurdsson	Dayton	Defender	Graduate	
2025	Moussa Ndiaye	VCU	Midfielder	Senior	
2026	Luke Adams	St. Louis	Defender	Junior	

=== Midfielder of the Year (2007–) ===
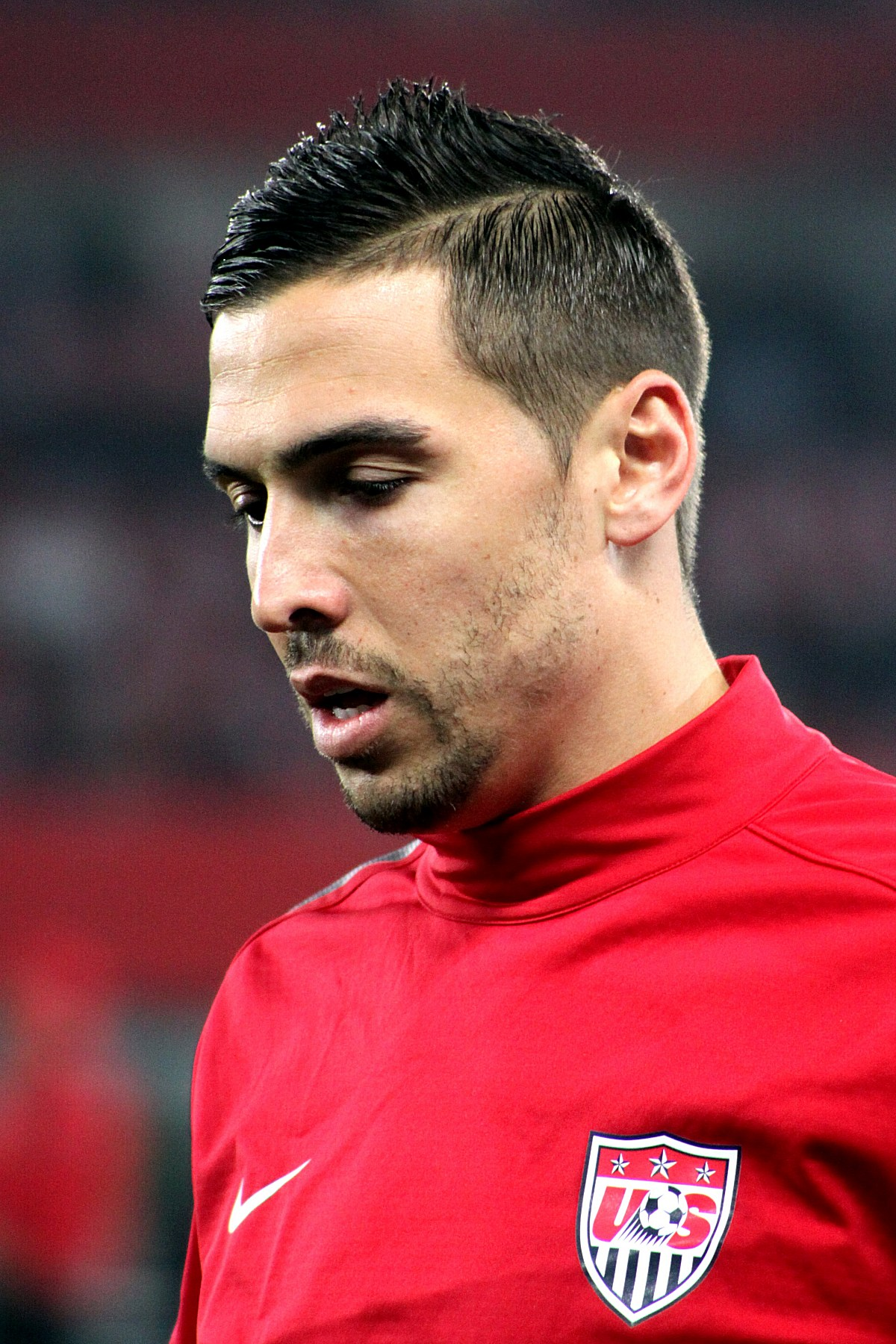
Geoff Cameron won the first A10 Midfielder of the Year Award in 2007.

Season	Player	School	Class	Reference
2007	Geoff Cameron	Rhode Island	Senior	
2008	Ben Arikian	UMass	Sophomore	
2009	Tim Richardson	Fordham	Sophomore	
2010	Tyler Gibson	Charlotte	Sophomore	
2011	Yoni Berhanu	George Washington	Senior	
2012	Donnie Smith	Charlotte	Senior	
2013	Alex Sweetin	Saint Louis	Senior	
2014	David Graydon	Saint Louis	Junior	
2015	Amass Amankona	Dayton	Senior	
2016	Garrett Heine	George Washington	Senior	
2017	Rok Taneski	Dayton	Sophomore	
2018	Siad Haji	VCU	Junior	
2019	Kingsford Adjei	Dayton	Sophomore	
2020	Kingsford Adjei (2)	Dayton	Junior	
2021	Celio Pompeu	VCU	Sophomore	
2022	Billy Hency	Loyola Chicago	Senior	
2023	Ask Ekeland	Duquesne	Sophomore	
2024	Daniel D'Ippolito	Fordham	Junior	
2025	Daniel D'Ippolito (2)	Fordham	Senior	
2026	Braden Seel	Dayton	Senior	
