= Atlantic 10 Conference Men's Soccer Freshman of the Year =

Atlantic 10 Men's Soccer Freshman of the Year
- Awarded for: the best freshman in the Atlantic 10 Conference
- Country: United States
- First award: 1987
- Currently held by: Pablo Martinez, Dayton

The Atlantic 10 Conference Men's Soccer Freshman of the Year award is an annual award given to the top freshman soccer player in the Atlantic 10 Conference. The award was first given out in 1987.

== Key ==
†	Co-Players of the Year
Division (X)	Indicates which division the soccer program is in; East or West

== Winners ==
=== Freshman of the Year (1987–present) ===
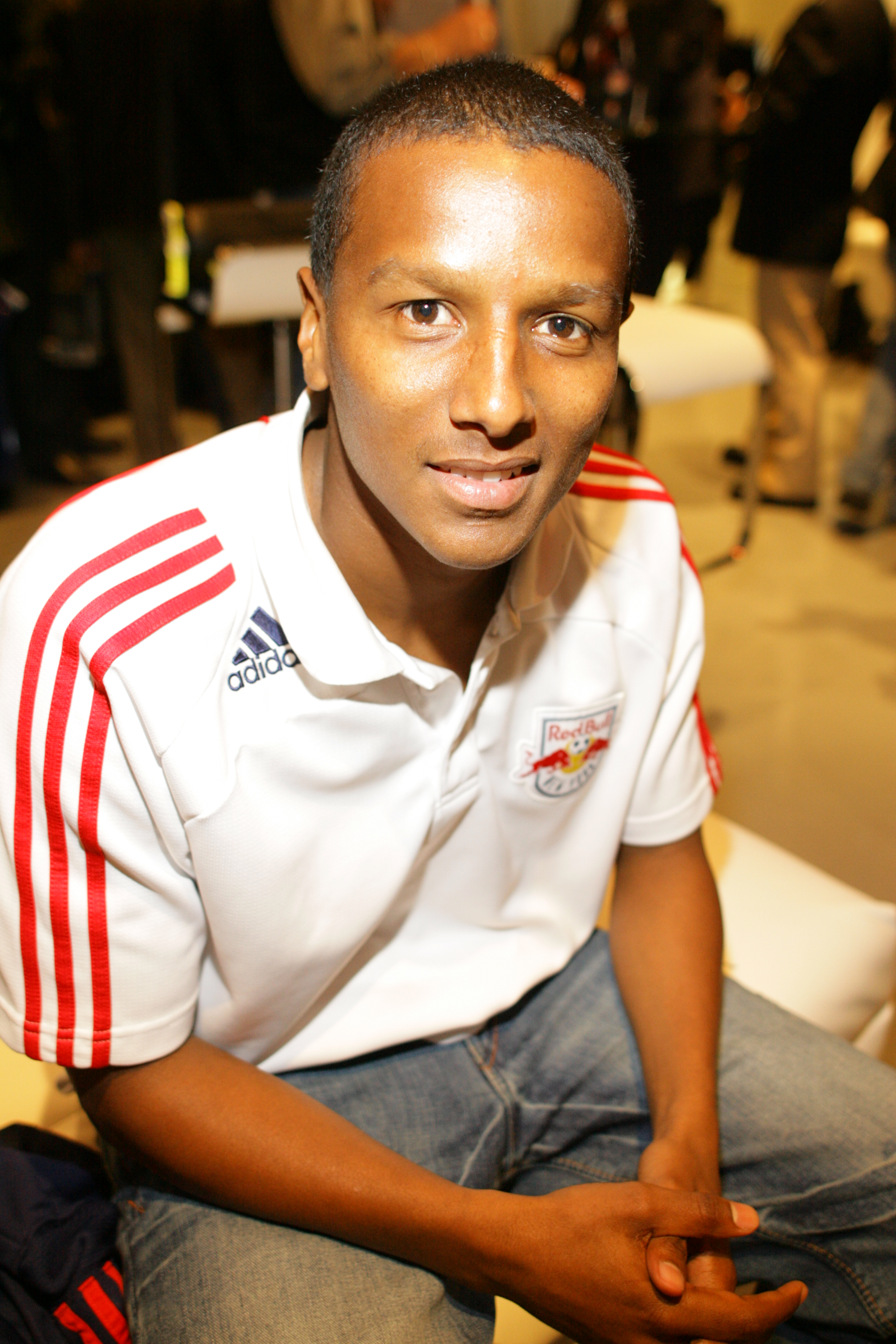
Danleigh Borman was the A10 Men's Soccer Freshman of the Year in 2004.

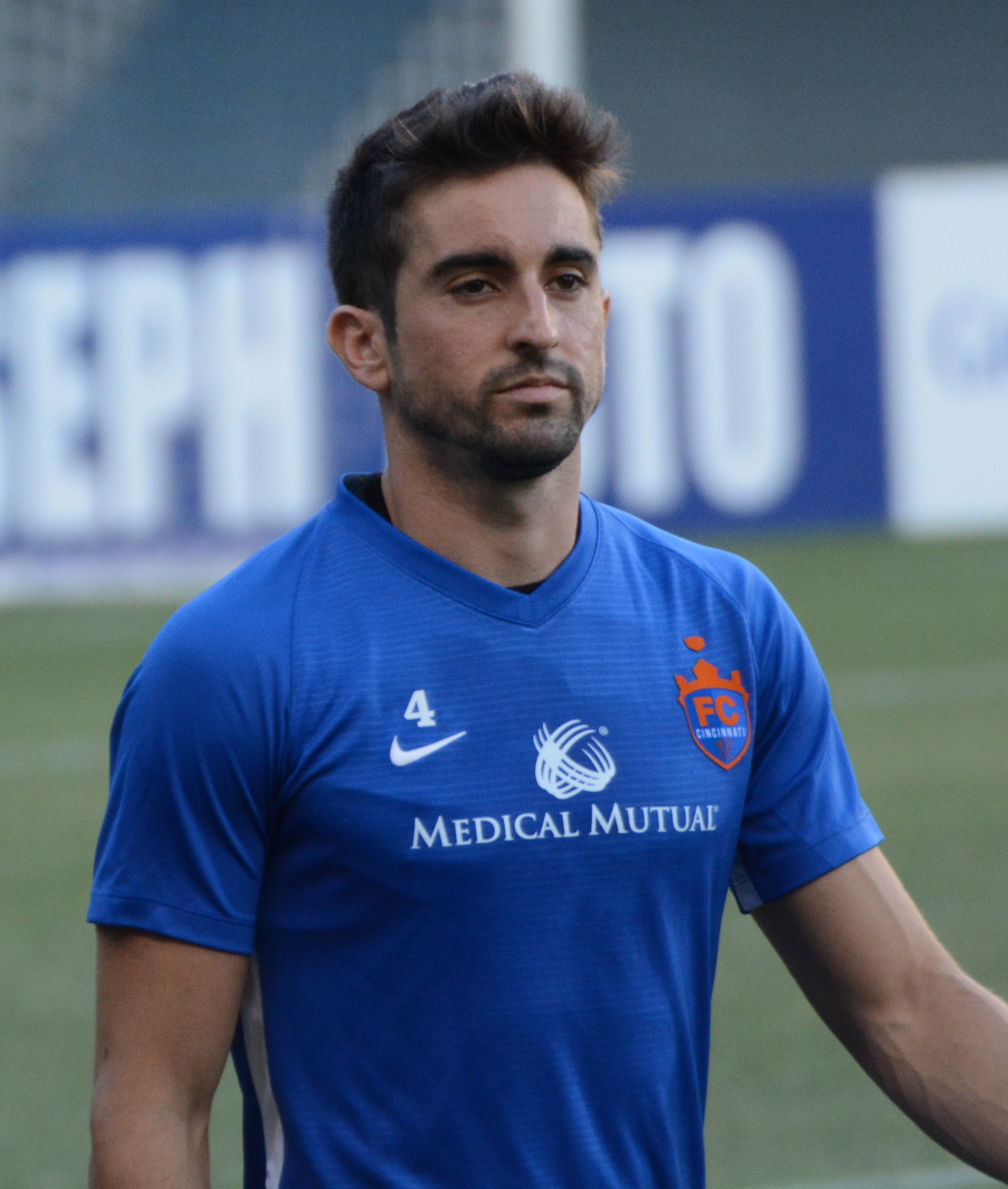
Tyler Gibson was the A10 Freshman of the Year in 2010.

Season	Player	School	Position	Reference
1987 (E)	Peter McEvoy	UMass	Defender	
1987 (W)	Danny Kelly	Penn State	Midfielder	
1988 (E)	Lino DiCuollo	Rutgers	Defender	
1988 (W)	Mario Lone	George Washington	Forward	
1989 (E)	Jeff Zaun	Rutgers	Defender	
1989 (W)	Chris Majewski; Renzo Massa	George Washington	Midfielder	
1990	Chris Cotton	Temple	Forward	
1991	Rob Johnson	Rutgers	Forward	
1992	Steve Masten	George Washington	Forward	
1993	Alan Branigan	Rutgers	Midfielder	
1994	Karstin Bremke	UMass	Defender	
1995	Chris Jones	George Washington	Midfielder	
1996	Maringo Vlijter	Xavier	Midfielder	
1997	Koen Kuiken	Xavier	Midfielder	
1998	Nicholas McCreath	Rhode Island	Forward	
1999	Anthony Curtis	Rhode Island	Midfielder	
2000	Andrew Kulinski	Saint Joseph's	Forward	
2001	Arnar Johannsson	George Washington	Forward	
2002	Steven Barten	Xavier	Midfielder	
2003	Zach Varga	Duquesne	Goalkeeper	
2004	Danleigh Borman	Rhode Island	Defender	
2005	Eric Sweetin	Saint Louis	Midfielder	
2006	Ron Viviano	Saint Louis	Defender	
2007	Colin Baker	Saint Joseph's	Forward	
2008	Yoni Berhanu	George Washington	Defender	
2009	Alex Sweetin	Saint Louis	Midfielder	
2010	Tyler Gibson	Charlotte	Midfielder	
2011	Giuseppe Gentile	Charlotte	Forward	
2012	Jared Martinelli	Temple	Midfielder	
2013	Steffen Kraus	George Mason	Goalkeeper	
2014	Nils Leifhelm	Rhode Island	Goalkeeper	
2015	János Löbe	Fordham	Midfielder	
2016	Stavros Zarokostas	Rhode Island	Midfielder	
2017	Davis Smith	UMass	Defender	
2018	John Klein III	Saint Louis	Forward	
2019	Toluwalase Oladeinbo	Dayton	Midfielder	
2020	Alec Hughes	UMass	Forward	
2021	Isak Øystese	Rhode Island	Forward	
2022	Basit Umar	Dayton	Midfielder	
2023	Andrey Salmeron	VCU	Midfielder	
2024	Andrew Armstrong	Dayton	Forward	
2025	Daniel Lang	Fordham	Defender	
2026	Pablo Martinez	Dayton	Midfielder	
