= 2024 Atlantic 10 men's soccer tournament =

Postseason soccer tournament

- Classification: Division I
- Teams: 8
- Matches: 7
- Site: Campus Sites
- Champions: Dayton (6th title)
- Winning coach: Dennis Currier (6th title)
- MVP: Hjalti Sigurdsson (Dayton)
- Broadcast: ESPN+

2024 Atlantic 10 Conference men's soccer standings
	Conf.					Overall
Team	W		L		T	W		L		T
George Mason	6	–	1	–	1	13	–	4	–	1
No. 12 Dayton ‡	5	–	1	–	2	13	–	2	–	3
Duquesne	5	–	2	–	1	11	–	4	–	2
No. 8 UMass +	5	–	2	–	1	10	–	3	–	5
Fordham +	4	–	1	–	3	8	–	5	–	5
Saint Louis +	4	–	1	–	3	8	–	4	–	8
Davidson	4	–	4	–	0	6	–	7	–	5
La Salle	3	–	3	–	2	6	–	8	–	4
Loyola Chicago	3	–	5	–	1	5	–	10	–	3
St. Bonaventure	2	–	4	–	2	6	–	8	–	3
VCU	1	–	4	–	3	4	–	6	–	7
Rhode Island	2	–	6	–	0	7	–	7	–	3
George Washington	1	–	6	–	1	3	–	12	–	2
Saint Joseph's	1	–	7	–	0	4	–	12	–	0
‡ – 2024 Atlantic 10 tournament champion + – At-large invitation to the 2024 NCAA tournament; As of December 18, 2024; Rankings from United Soccer Coaches; Source: Atlantic 10

The 2024 Atlantic 10 men's soccer tournament was the post season men's soccer tournament for the Atlantic 10 Conference held from November 8 to November 17, 2024. The seven-match tournament will take place at campus sites, with the higher seed hosting. The eight-team single-elimination tournament consists of three rounds based on seeding from regular season conference play. The defending champions are the Dayton Flyers.

== Seeding ==
The top eight teams in the regular season earned a spot in the tournament. Teams were seeded based on regular season conference record and tiebreakers were used to determine seedings of teams that finished with the same record

Seed	School	Conference Record	Points
1	George Mason	6–1–1	19
2	Dayton	5–1–2	17
3	UMass	5–2–1	16
4	Duquesne	5–2–1	16
5	Fordham	4–1–3	15
6	Saint Louis	4–1–3	15
7	Davidson	4–4–0	12
8	La Salle	3–3–2	11

== Bracket ==
Quarterfinals; Nov. 8-9
1	George Mason	2
8	La Salle	0
4	Duquesne	0
5	Fordham	3
(Pairings are reseeded after the first round)
2	Dayton	1
7	Davidson	0
3	UMass	0 (0)
6	Saint Louis (pen.)	0 (3)

Semifinals; Nov. 13
1	George Mason	1
6	Saint Louis	2
2	Dayton	2
5	Fordham	0

Final; Nov. 17
6	Saint Louis	0
2	Dayton	3

== Schedule ==
=== First Round ===
November 8	#2 Dayton	1–0	#7 Davidson	Dayton, OH
7:00 p.m. ET	Joseph Melto Quiah (yellow card) 30'; Andrew Armstrong 86'; Adebayo Dikko (yellow card) 86'; Sidike Jabateh (yellow card) 86'	Report	Alonzo Clarke (yellow card) 32'; Brady McGlone (yellow card) 54'; Lucas Beltran (yellow card) 63'; Jack Brown (yellow card) 90'	Stadium: Baujan Field; Attendance: 1,259; Referee: Hilario Grajeda; Assistant referees: Kevin Fikar; Erin Patterson; Fourth official: Cory Boyes

November 8	#1 George Mason	2–0	#8 La Salle	Fairfax, VA
7:00 p.m. ET	Javier Montava 32'; Marek Gonda (yellow card) 58'; Kelly Janssen (yellow card) 67' (goal) 72'	Report	Nevin Baer (yellow card) 58'; Andrew Rosenbaum (yellow card) 60' (yellow-red card) 87'; Oluwatobi Osoba (yellow card) 66'; La Salle Team (yellow card) 66'; Jules Dechert (yellow card) 67'; Drew Blackwell (yellow card) 87'	Stadium: George Mason Stadium; Attendance: 1,370; Referee: John McCloskey; Assistant referees: Jeffrey Skinker; George Vergara Jr. Fourth official: Angelo Petruccy

November 9	#3 UMass	0–0 (a.e.t.) (0–3 p)	#6 Saint Louis	Amherst, MA
12:00 p.m. ET	Andrew Ortiz (yellow card) 20'; Joey Bianco (yellow card) 93'	Report	Nate Ward (yellow card) 57'	Stadium: Rudd Field; Attendance: 928; Referee: Adam Kilpatrick; Assistant referees: Randall Kelley; Adam Cook; Fourth official: Victor Matheson
	Penalties
	Alec Hughes (penalty missed); Johan Feilscher (penalty missed); Oliver Akintade (penalty missed)		(penalty scored) Max Floriani; (penalty scored) Grady Easton; (penalty scored) Luis Lara

November 9	#4 Duquesne	0–3	#5 Fordham	Pittsburgh, PA
7:00 p.m. ET	Christoffer Vie Angell (yellow card) 49'; Ashwin Menon (yellow card) 81'; Mikey Morales (yellow card) 84' (red card) 84'	Report	Daniel D'Ippolito 46', 61', 75'; Jed Dixon (yellow card) 66'	Stadium: Baujan Field; Attendance: 534; Referee: Nickrod Fateh; Assistant referees: Ross Kleinstuber; Alfonso Fajardo; Fourth official: Sam Reynolds

=== Semifinals ===
November 13	#1 George Mason	1–2	#6 Saint Louis	Fairfax, VA
7:00 p.m. ET	Marek Gonda (yellow card) 32'; Javi Sanchez 69' (pen.)	Report	Carlos Leatherman (yellow card) 16'; Matthew Wrobel 31' (yellow card) 87'; Xavier Holloway (yellow card) 38'; Max Floriani 40'; Luis Lara (yellow card) 43'; Nate Shapiro (yellow card) 69'; Saint Louis Team (yellow card) 69'	Stadium: George Mason Stadium; Attendance: 660

November 13	#2 Dayton	2–0	#5 Fordham	Dayton, OH
7:00 p.m. ET	Hjalti Sigurdsson 4'; Ethan Sassine (yellow card) 45' (goal) 68'	Report	Owen Hardy (yellow card) 31'; Thomas Gray (yellow card) 32'; Fordham Team (yellow card) 32'; Daniel D'Ippolito (yellow card) 34'; Bennett Leitner (yellow card) 75'; Andre Insalaco (red card) 82'; Benji Jones (yellow card) 82'; #11 Lukas Hackaa (yellow card) 86'	Stadium: Baujan Field; Attendance: 1,012; Referee: Sorin Stoica; Assistant referees: Cory Richardson; John Safar; Fourth official: Eric Tattersall

=== Final ===
November 17	#2 Dayton	3–0	#6 Saint Louis	Dayton, OH
12:00 p.m. ET	Felix Buabeng 42', 73'; Ethan Sassine (yellow card) 44'; Luis Bremaud (yellow card) 46'; Joseph Melto Quiah 70'	Report	Carlos Leatherman (yellow card) 30' (yellow-red card) 35'; Luis Lara (yellow card) 39'; Grady Easton (yellow card) 44'; Saint Louis Team (yellow card) 73'; Joey Maher (yellow card) 80'	Stadium: Baujan Field; Attendance: 1,556; Referee: Victor Borges; Assistant referees: Donald Williams; Andrey Castel; Fourth official: Brian Apwisch

== All-Tournament team ==
Player	Team
Andrew Armstrong	Dayton
Martin Bakken	Dayton
Felix Buabeng	Dayton
Cario Caestano	Dayton
Melto Quiah	Dayton
**Hjalti Sigurdsson**	Dayton
Daniel D’lppolito	Fordham
Javier Montava	George Mason
Jeremi Abonnel	Saint Louis
Max Floriani	Saint Louis
Joey Maher	Saint Louis

MVP in Bold
