= 2011 Atlantic 10 men's soccer tournament =

Soccer tournament season

Tournament details
- Country: United States

Final positions
- Champions: Xavier
- Runner-up: George Washington

The 2011 Atlantic 10 Men's Soccer Tournament was the postseason tournament of the Atlantic 10 Conference for the 2011 season to determine the Atlantic 10 Conference’s champion and automatic berth into the 2011 NCAA Division I Men's Soccer Championship. The tournament was won by Xavier, who defeated George Washington on penalty kicks in the championship game. Adar Cohen was named the tournament's Most Outstanding Player.

== See also ==
- Atlantic 10 Conference
- 2011 in American soccer
- 2011 NCAA Division I Men's Soccer Championship
- 2011 NCAA Division I men's soccer season
