= Robert Irvine (soccer) =

English-born Canadian soccer player (born 1974)

Personal information
- Full name: Robert Irvine
- Date of birth: September 5, 1974 (age 52)
- Place of birth: Leeds, England
- Position: Midfielder

College career
Years	Team	Apps	(Gls)
1994–1997	Syracuse Orange		

Senior career*
Years	Team	Apps	(Gls)
1998	Albany Alleycats		
1998	Toronto Lynx	10	(0)
1999	Glen Shields Sun Devils	5	(3)

International career
1991	Canada U17	1	(0)

Managerial career
- 2001–2003: Syracuse Orange (assistant)
- 2004–2005: College of the Southwest
- 2006–2013: Penn Quakers (assistant)
- 2014–2015: Kean University
- 2016–2021: La Salle Explorers
- * Club domestic league appearances and goals

Robert Irvine (born September 5, 1974) is an English born Canadian former soccer player and soccer coach.

== Playing career ==
Irvine played in 1998 with Albany Alleycats in the USISL D-3 Pro League. Midway through the season he signed with the Toronto Lynx of the USL A-League, and made his debut on July 19, 1998 against Rochester Raging Rhinos. The following season he played with Glen Shields Sun Devils in the Canadian Professional Soccer League. He recorded his first goal on June 6, 1999 against London City.

In 1999, he played in the World Indoor Soccer League with Sacramento Knights.

== International career ==
He made his debut for the Canada men's national under-17 soccer team on March 25, 1991 against Netherlands Antilles.

== Managerial career ==
Irvine was named the head coach for Kean University in 2014. In 2016, he served as the head coach for La Salle Explorers men's soccer. On July 16, 2021 he resigned as head coach for La Salle, and was named the talent identification manager for the East Coast for the United States Soccer Federation.
