= Nicholas McCreath =

Jamaican footballer

Personal information
- Full name: Nicholas Valentino McCreath
- Place of birth: Kingston, Jamaica
- Height: 5 ft 7 in (1.70 m)
- Position: Striker

Youth career
- Harbor View II
- 1998–2001: Rhode Island Rams

Senior career*
Years	Team	Apps	(Gls)
2002–2004	Harbor View		
2004–2005	Rivoli United		
2005–2007	Tivoli Gardens		
2008–2009	August Town		
2009–2010	Scotiabank		

International career
- Jamaica U-17
- Jamaica U-20
- Jamaica
- * Club domestic league appearances and goals

Nicholas Valentino McCreath is a Jamaican football midfielder who plays for Scotiabank F.C. in the KSAFA/Western Sports Business House football league.

== Youth ==
McCreath graduated from Kingston College High School in Jamaica. As a youth, he played for Tivoli Gardens F.C. and the Harbor View F.C. second division team. He attended the University of Rhode Island, playing on the men's soccer team from 1998 to 2001. He was a 2000 Third Team and 2001 First Team All American. He graduated with a bachelor's degree in business administration.

== Professional ==
McCreath played for Harbor View F.C. from 2002 to 2004, Rivoli United F.C. from 2004 to 2005, Tivoli Gardens F.C. from 2005 to 2007 and August Town F.C. from 2007 to 2009.

== National team ==
McCreath has played for the Jamaican U-17, U-20, U-23 and senior national teams.
