= Kwame Oduro =

Ghanaian football coach

Personal information
- Date of birth: c. 1985 (age 40–41)
- Place of birth: Accra, Ghana

Team information
- Current team: Oregon State (women) (assistant)

College career
Years	Team	Apps	(Gls)
2003	Houghton College		
2004–2006	Niagara Purple Eagles		

Senior career*
Years	Team	Apps	(Gls)
2007	Cleveland Internationals		

Managerial career
- 2009–2010: Nyack College (assistant)
- 2011–2014: Canisius (assistant)
- 2015–2024: St. Bonaventure
- 2025–: Oregon State (women) (assistant)
- * Club domestic league appearances and goals

Kwame Oduro is a Ghanaian college soccer coach, who is currently an assistant coach with the Oregon State Beavers women's soccer team.

== Career ==
Oduro was born in Accra and raised in Toronto. He played college soccer at Houghton College and Niagara University. In 2011, he joined the Canisius coaching staff as an assistant. In December 2014, he was hired by St. Bonaventure to be their head coach. He resigned from his position in February of 2025.

Oduro joined the Oregon State Beavers women's program as an assistant coach in 2025.

== Personal life and education ==
Born in Accra, Ghana until he moved to Toronto, Ontario. In 2007, Oduro earned his bachelor's degree in political science from Niagara. He earned his master's degrees in organizational leadership from Nyack College and sports administration from Canisius. He is now the head coach for the St. Bonaventure Men's Soccer team and also spends time substituting at local high schools.

== Achievements ==
Oduro is a two-time MAAC All-Academic Team honoree and 2005 ESPN The Magazine. All MAAC Team. Academic All-District Second Team.
