= Jim McElderry =

American soccer coach

Personal information
- Position: Striker

College career
Years	Team	Apps	(Gls)
1990–1993	Fairfield Stags		

Senior career*
Years	Team	Apps	(Gls)
1994–1997	New York Fever		
1997–1998	Long Island Rough Riders		
- New York Freedom

Managerial career
- 1993–2003: Fairfield Stags (assistant)
- 2003–2018: Fordham Rams
- 2019–present: Rutgers Scarlet Knights
- * Club domestic league appearances and goals

Jim McElderry is an American soccer coach who currently coaches the men's soccer program at Rutgers University.

== Life ==
=== Fairfield years ===
A 1993 graduate of Fairfield University with a Bachelor of Science degree in mathematics and a minor in Economics, McElderry was a four-year letterman for the Fairfield Stags men's soccer team. He earned several post-season honors as a player, highlighted with the 1992 Metro Atlantic Athletic Conference ("MAAC") Player of the Year award. He also received All-MAAC honors as a back in 1992 after receiving All-MAAC honors in 1991. McElderry was inducted into the Fairfield Athletic Hall of Fame in 1998.

From 1993 to 2003, he served as an assistant men's soccer coach at Fairfield University. Meanwhile, he played professionally for the New York Fever from 1994 to 1997, for the Long Island Rough Riders from 1997 to 1998, and eventually the New York Freedoms.

=== Fordham years ===
He was appointed as the fourth head coach of Fordham in 2003.

In 2005, he led the Rams to an 8–5–5 record, marking the school's first winning season since 1998. In 2006, he led the Rams to an impressive 9–3–5 record, leading the Rams to a national ranking as high as 12th.

His 2011 team, solidified by future MLS draft pick Ryan Meara in goal, won the Atlantic 10's regular season championship. Using a 1–0 double overtime win in the final match day at Temple, Fordham secured the first seed in the conference tournament with four consecutive wins to close the regular season slate.

In 2014, McElderry brought the Rams to the NCAA Tournament with a blistering performance in the Atlantic 10 conference championships. Qualifying as the sixth seed, Fordham defeated the host team #3 VCU in penalties, ranked #2 Saint Louis, and #1 seed Rhode Island in consecutive games. The team finished 8–9–4 on the season after a 2–1 first round loss to Dartmouth.

He was on the 2009 NCAA Division I Men's National Ranking Committee.

=== Rutgers years ===
On December 8, 2018, McElderry was named the head coach of Rutgers University.
