= La Salle Explorers men's soccer =

American college soccer team

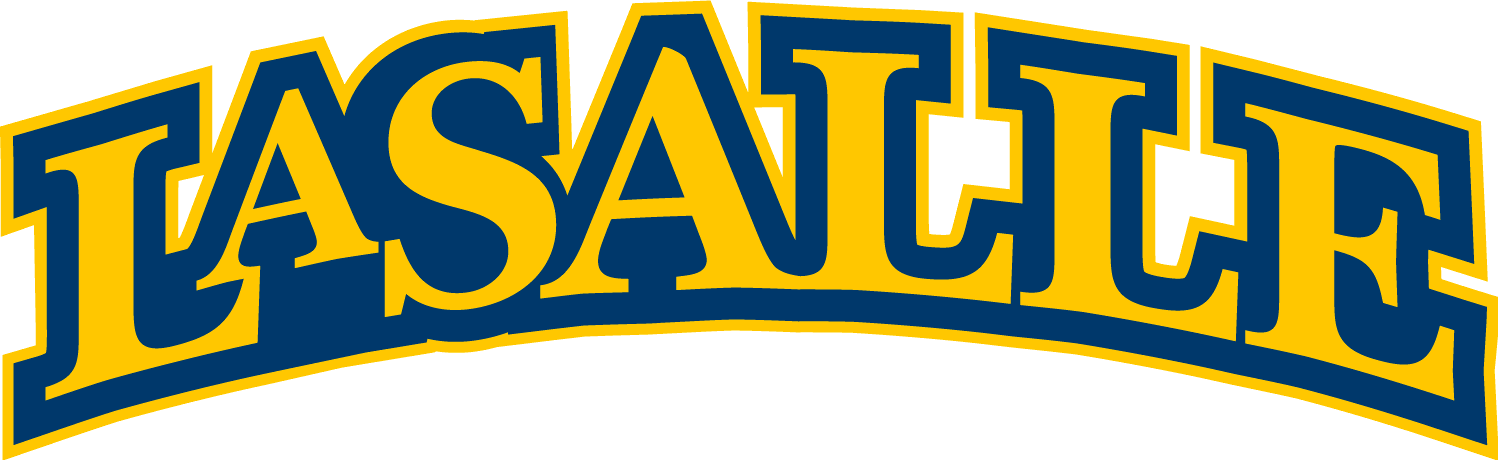
- Founded: 1949; 77 years ago
- University: La Salle University
- Head coach: Taylor Thames (4th season)
- Conference: A-10
- Location: Philadelphia, Pennsylvania, US
- Stadium: McCarthy Stadium (capacity: 7,500)
- Nickname: Explorers
- Colors: Blue and gold
Home	Away

NCAA tournament appearances
- 1978

Conference Regular Season championships
- 1984, 1985, 1987

For information on all La Salle University sports, see La Salle Explorers

The La Salle Explorers men's soccer team is a varsity intercollegiate athletic team of La Salle University in Philadelphia, Pennsylvania, United States. The team is a member of the Atlantic 10 Conference, which is part of the National Collegiate Athletic Association's Division I. La Salle's first men's soccer team was fielded in 1949. The team plays its home games at McCarthy Stadium. The Explorers are coached by Taylor Thames.

== Seasons ==
Statistics overview
Season	Coach	Overall	Conference	Standing	Postseason
La Salle (Independent) (1949–1964)
1949	Frank Wiehec	3–4–1			
1950	Joseph Smith	2–6–0			
1951	Joseph Smith	1–7–0			
1952	Joseph Smith	3–5–0			
1953	Joseph Smith	1–7–2			
1954	Joseph Smith	3–8–0			
1955	Joseph Smith	2–6–0			
1956	Joseph Smith	2–6–0			
1957	Joseph Smith	4–6–0			
1958	Joseph Smith	3–6–2			
1959	Joseph Smith	5–5–1			
1960	Joseph Smith	5–5–0			
1961	Joseph Smith	3–7–1			
1962	Joseph Smith	0–10–1			
1963	Joseph Smith	1–6–1			
1964	Joseph Smith	1–8–0			
La Salle (MAC) (1965–1968)
1965	Joseph Smith	1–7–0	1–5–0		
1966	Joseph Smith	0–8–1	0–6–1		
1967	Dr. John Smith	0–9–1	0–7–1		
1968	Dr. John Smith	2–10–0	1–10–0		
MAC Total:		3–34–2	2–28–2		
La Salle (Independent) (1969–1979)
1969	Bill Wilkinson	5–7–1			
1970	Bill Wilkinson	7–5–1			
1971	Bill Wilkinson	10–3–2			
1972	Bill Wilkinson	9–4–1			
1973	Bill Wilkinson	9–5–1			
1974	Bill Wilkinson	6–4–4			
1975	Bill Wilkinson	6–6–1			
1976	Shelly Chamberlain	10–4–2			
1977	Bill Wilkinson	9–5–1			
1978	Bill Wilkinson	9–5–1			NCAA First Round
1979	Bill Wilkinson	10–7–1			
La Salle (ECC) (1980)
1980	Bill Wilkinson	2–9–4	1–3–1		
ECC Total:		2–9–4	1–3–1		
La Salle (Independent) (1981–1983)
1981	Bill Wilkinson	10–3–2			
1982	Bill Wilkinson	14–4–0			
1983	Bill Wilkinson	7–7–2			
La Salle (MAAC) (1984–1991)
1984	Bill Wilkinson	7–10–2	5–1–1	1st	
1985	Bill Wilkinson	10–6–3	6–0–1	1st	
1986	Bill Wilkinson	10–7–2	5–2–0	3rd	
1987	Pat Farrell	11–6–2	6–1–0	T–1st	
1988	Pat Farrell	10–8–3	5–1–1	2nd	
1989	Pat Farrell	10–6–0	4–1–0	2nd, South	
1990	Pat Farrell	11–10–1	6–2–0	2nd	
1991	Pat Farrell	11–7–1	6–2–0	2nd	
MAAC Total:		80–60–14	32–8–3		
La Salle (MCC) (1992–1994)
1992	Pat Farrell	9–10–2	1–5–1	8th	MCC Runner-Up
1993	Pat Farrell	1–16–2	1–5–0	7th	MCC First Round
1994	Pat Farrell	11–8–0	5–4–0	3rd	MCC First Round
MCC Total:		21–34–4	7–14–1		
La Salle (Atlantic 10 Conference) (1995–present)
1995	Pat Farrell	10–7–2	5–4–2	5th	
1996	Pat Farrell	12–5–2	7–2–2	2nd	A10 Semifinals
1997	Pat Farrell	10–9–1	7–4–0	3rd	A10 Runner-Up
1998	Pat Farrell	3–13–1	2–8–1	10th	
1999	Pat Farrell	8–10–0	5–6–0	T–7th	
2000	Pat Farrell	2–13–0	1–9–0	11th	
2001	Pat Farrell	6–9–2	4–6–1	8th	
2002	Pat Farrell	8–10–1	6–5–0	6th	
2003	Pat Farrell	5–11–3	3–8–0	T–9th	
2004	Pat Farrell	10–8–1	6–5–0	6th	A10 First Round
2005	Pat Farrell	6–9–4	3–4–2	9th	
2006	Pat Farrell	7–9–2	3–5–1	9th	
2007	Pat Farrell	6–11–1	4–5–0	T–8th	
2008	Pat Farrell	2–14–3	1–8–0	14th	
2009	Pat Farrell	6–10–3	2–5–2	11th	
2010	Pat Farrell	9–7–3	6–2–1	2nd	A10 Runner-Up
2011	Pat Farrell	7–9–4	4–2–3	4th	A10 Semifinals
2012	Pat Farrell	10–7–3	4–4–1	7th	A10 First Round
2013	Pat Farrell	8–8–4	5–2–1	4th	A10 Semifinals
2014	Pat Farrell	7–9–3	3–3–2	T–6th	A10 First Round
2015	Pat Farrell	6–10–2	2–5–1	11th	
2016	Rob Irvine	10–8–1	5–3–0	3rd	A10 First Round
2017	Rob Irvine	8–9–1	3–5–0	10th	
2018	Rob Irvine	3–11–3	0–5–3	13th	
2019	Rob Irvine	8–9–1	4–4–0	6th	A10 First Round
2020	Rob Irvine	5–5–1	2–3–1	8th	
2021	Taylor Thames	6–10–0	2–6–0	12th	
2022	Taylor Thames	5–9–4	3–3–2	8th	A10 First Round
2023	Taylor Thames	5–8–4	1–5–2	14th	
2024	Taylor Thames	6–8–4	3–3–2	8th	A10 First Round
Total:		471–584–118 (.452)			
National champion Postseason invitational champion Conference regular season champion Conference regular season and conference tournament champion Division regular season champion Division regular season and conference tournament champion Conference tournament champion

=== NCAA tournament results ===
La Salle has appeared in one NCAA tournament.

Year	Record	Seed	Region	Round	Opponent	Results
1978	8–4–1	N/A	Temple	First round	Philadelphia U	L 1–5
