= Fordham Rams men's soccer =

American college soccer team

- Founded: 1952; 74 years ago
- University: Fordham University
- Head coach: Carlo Acquista (5th season)
- Conference: Atlantic 10
- Location: The Bronx, New York, US
- Stadium: Coffey Field (capacity: 7,000)
- Nickname: Rams
- Colors: Maroon and white
Home	Away

NCAA tournament Quarterfinals
- 2017

NCAA tournament Round of 16
- 2017

NCAA tournament Round of 32
- 2017, 2020

NCAA tournament appearances
- 1996, 2014, 2016, 2017, 2020, 2024

Conference tournament championships
- 1986, 1987, 1990, 1996, 2014, 2016, 2020

Conference regular season championships
- 1981, 1982, 1984, 1985, 1986, 2011

The Fordham Rams men's soccer team is a varsity intercollegiate athletic team of Fordham University in The Bronx, New York, United States. The team is a member of the Atlantic 10 Conference, which is part of the National Collegiate Athletic Association's Division I. Fordham's first men's soccer team was fielded in 1952. The team plays its home games at Coffey Field in The Bronx, New York. The Rams are coached by Carlo Acquista.

== Seasons ==
Fordham University has only kept statistics from the 1979 season onward on file, although the program began in 1952.

Season	Team	Overall	Conference	Standing	Postseason
Records unavailable (1952–1978)
Eastern College Athletic Conference (1979)
1979	Frank Schnur	9–8–2			
ECAC Total:		9–8–2			
1980	Frank Schnur	11–6–0			
Metro Atlantic Athletic Conference (1981–1989)
1981	Frank Schnur	9–6–2	4–0–1	1st	
1982	Frank Schnur	11–2–4	5–0–0	1st	
1983	Frank Schnur	12–6–2	6–1–0		
1984	Frank Schnur	10–6–4	4–1–2		
1985	Frank Schnur	13–4–3	6–0–1	2nd	
1986	Frank Schnur	5–14–1	3–2–0	2nd	
1987	Frank Schnur	11–7–3	4–1–0	2nd	
1988	Frank Schnur	9–11–1	5–2–0	3rd	
1989	Frank Schnur	5–13–1	3–1–1	2nd, North	
MAAC Total:		85–69–21	40–8–5		
Patriot League (1990–1994)
1990	Frank Schnur	12–7–1	4–2–0	2nd	
1991	Frank Schnur	2–15–3	2–5–0	6th	
1992	Frank Schnur	5–13–1	3–4–0	5th	
1993	Frank Schnur	5–12–2	1–6–0	8th	
1994	Frank Schnur	6–10–0	0–7–0	8th	
Patriot League Total:		30–57–7	10–24–0		
Atlantic-10 Conference (1995–present)
1995	Frank Schnur	9–5–4	3–4–4	7th	
1996	Frank Schnur	12–10–1	7–3–1	3rd	A-10 Champions; NCAA First Round
1997	Frank Schnur	7–13–0	3–8–0	T–10th	
1998	Frank Schnur	12–7–1	8–3–0	2nd	A-10 Semifinal
1999	Frank Schnur	0–20–0	0–11–0	12th	
2000	Frank Schnur	6–11–0	3–7–0	T–9th	
2001	Frank Schnur	4–14–0	3–8–0	T–10th	
2002	Frank Schnur	4–14–0	1–10–0	12th	
2003	Jim McElderry	4–12–1	3–8–0	T–9th	
2004	Jim McElderry	3–12–3	1–7–3	12th	
2005	Jim McElderry	8–5–5	2–4–3	10th	
2006	Jim McElderry	9–3–5	3–3–3	7th	
2007	Jim McElderry	6–10–3	5–4–0	5th	A-10 Quarterfinal
2008	Jim McElderry	9–8–2	5–3–1	5th	A-10 Quarterfinal
2009	Jim McElderry	9–7–3	6–1–2	3rd	A-10 Quarterfinal
2010	Jim McElderry	10–8–0	5–4–0	T–6th	
2011	Jim McElderry	11–7–1	7–2–0	1st	A-10 Semifinal
2012	Jim McElderry	6–7–4	2–4–3	11th	
2013	Jim McElderry	5–11–1	2–5–1	11th	
2014	Jim McElderry	8–9–4	3–3–2	7th	A-10 Champions; NCAA First Round
2015	Jim McElderry	7–8–4	4–3–1	T–4th	A-10 Semifinal
2016	Jim McElderry	10–7–4	5–2–1	2nd	A-10 Champions; NCAA First Round
2017	Jim McElderry	14–6–3	5–2–1	5th	A-10 Semifinals; NCAA Quarterfinals
2018	Jim McElderry	8–5–4	4–3–1	6th	A-10 Quarterfinals
2019	Carlo Acquista	7–10–3	5–2–1	5th	A-10 Semifinals
2020	Carlo Acquista	7–1–2	3–0–2	3rd	A-10 Champions
2021	Carlo Acquista	7–9–3	4–3–1	4th	A-10 Semifinals
2022	Carlo Acquista	3–4–9	1–2–5	12th	
2023	Carlo Acquista	6–4–7	3–3–2	8th	A-10 Quarterfinals
2024	Carlo Acquista	8–6–5	4–1–3	T–5th	A-10 Semifinals
A10 Total:		171–212–50	85–108–28		
Total:		306–352–80			
National champion Postseason invitational champion Conference regular season champion Conference regular season and conference tournament champion Division regular season champion Division regular season and conference tournament champion Conference tournament champion

=== NCAA tournament results ===
Fordham has appeared in five NCAA tournaments. Their best performance came in 2017, where they reached the quarterfinals for the first time in program history.

Year	Record	Seed	Region	Round	Rival	Results
1996	11–10–1	N/A	Williamsburg	Play-in round First round	Loyola (MD); St. John's	3–2; 1–5
2014	8–9–4	N/A	Regional 3	First round	No. 20 Dartmouth	1–2
2016	10–6–4	N/A	Regional 3	First round	Boston College	0–1
2017	14–5–3	N/A	Regional 3	First round Second round Third round Quarterfinals	St. Francis Brooklyn #11 Virginia #6 Duke #3 North Carolina	3–2 (a.e.t.); 1–0; 2–2 (8–7 p); 1–2
2020	7–1–2	N/A	N/A	Second round	Marshall	1–2 (a.e.t.)

== Notable alumni ==
- (Scotland) Grant Kerr
- (United States) Sal Leanti
- (United States) Matt Lewis
- (Puerto Rico) Mark Lugris
- (Republic of Ireland) Ryan Meara
- (Ghana) Rashid Nuhu
- Jack Shannon
- (United States) John Wolyniec
- (Germany) Janos Loebe

== Honors ==
- Tri-State Conference
  - Regular Season (3): 1982, 1984, 1985
- Metro Atlantic Athletic Conference
  - Tournament (2): 1986, 1987
  - Regular Season (3): 1981, 1982, 1986
- Patriot League
  - Tournament (1): 1990
- Atlantic-10 Conference
  - Tournament (3): 1996, 2014, 2016
  - Regular Season (1): 2011

== Rivalries ==
Fordham's biggest rivals are St. John's and Manhattan. Fordham's rivalry with St. John's goes back to the 1970s, and their rivalry with Manhattan is known as the Battle of the Bronx.
