= George Mason Stadium =

Stadium in Fairfax, Virginia

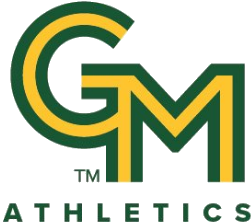

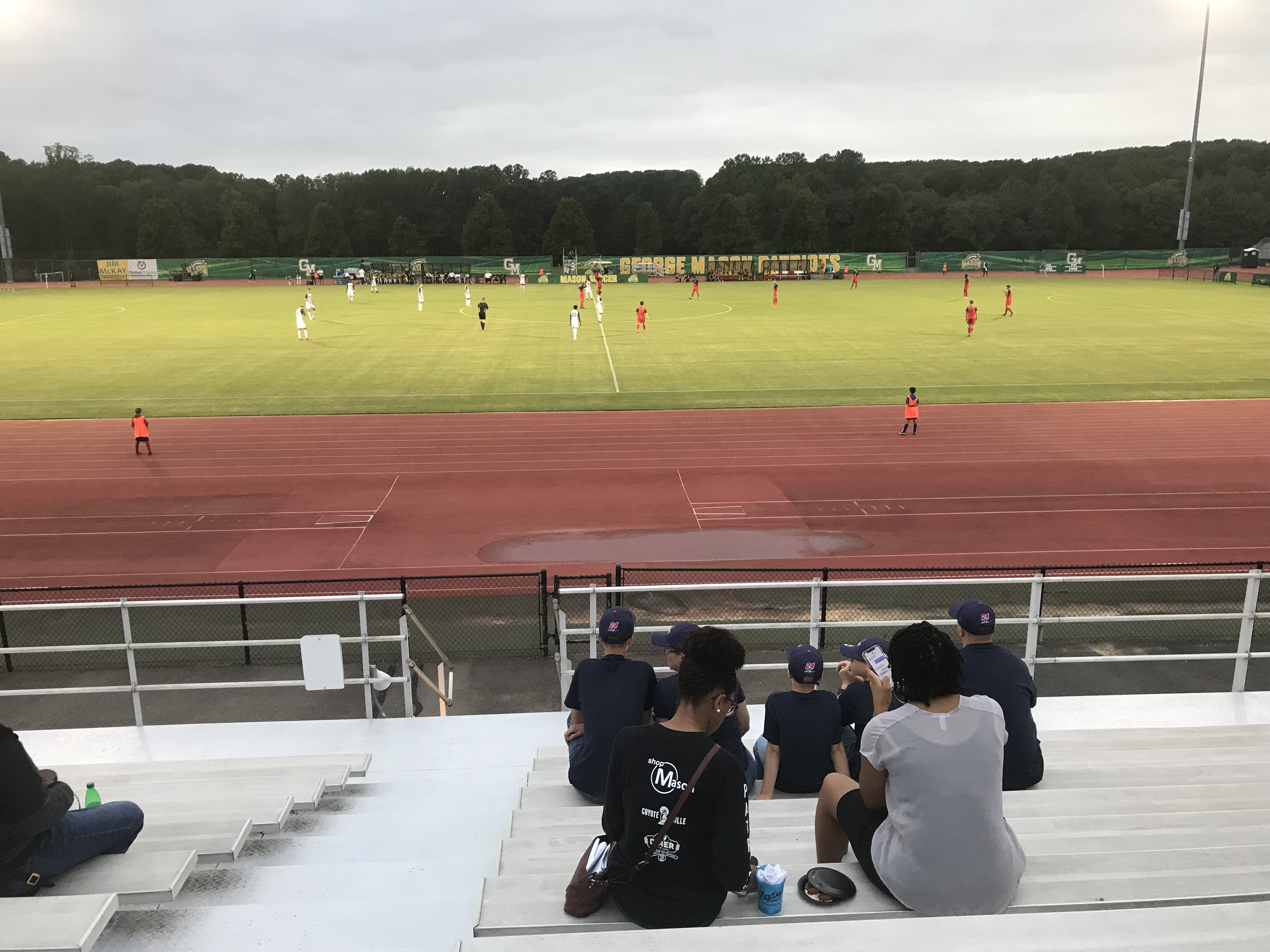
- View from the stadium stands in 2019

- Location in the United States Location in Virginia–
- Interactive map of George Mason Stadium
- Address: George Mason, Virginia; United States
- Coordinates: 38.8337°N 77.3166°W
- Owner: George Mason University
- Capacity: 5,000
- Type: Stadium
- Current use: Soccer; Track and field

Construction
- Opened: 1982; 44 years ago

Tenants
- George Mason Patriots (NCAA) teams: men's and women's soccer; men's and women's track and field; women's lacrosse; Old Glory DC (MLR) 2026-

Website
- gomason.com/george-mason-stadium

George Mason Stadium is a 5,000-seat stadium in Fairfax, Virginia on the campus of George Mason University. It serves as the home to George Mason's soccer and lacrosse teams.

The stadium hosted the first home game for the Washington Bayhawks as a Washington, D.C.-based franchise on May 12, 2007, with other games placed at Georgetown's Multi-Sport Field. In 2008, George Mason Stadium hosted all but one Bayhawks home game.

Since starting in 2026, George Mason Stadium has hosted Old Glory DC, a member team of Major League Rugby. The team had previously played a single exhibition match there in 2025.

Preceded by Fetzer Field	Host of the Women's College Cup; 1985–1986	Succeeded by Warren McGuirk Alumni Stadium
