= János Löbe =

German footballer (born 1995)

Personal information
- Date of birth: 21 August 1995 (age 31)
- Place of birth: Kierspe, Germany
- Height: 1.78 m (5 ft 10 in)
- Position: Defender

Youth career
- Wuppertaler SV

College career
Years	Team	Apps	(Gls)
2015–2018	Fordham Rams	79	(26)

Senior career*
Years	Team	Apps	(Gls)
2013–2015	Wuppertaler SV	23	(0)
2017	K–W United	4	(3)
2018	New York Red Bulls U-23	2	(1)
2019	New York Red Bulls II	23	(1)
2020–2021	Miami FC	44	(0)
2022–2024	SV Eintracht Hohkeppel	45	(2)
- * Club domestic league appearances and goals as of 02:21, 4 July 2024 (UTC)

János Löbe (born 21 August 1995) is a German professional footballer who most recently played as a defender and midfielder for Mittelrheinliga club SV Eintracht Hohkeppel.

== Career ==
=== Youth and college ===
Born in Kierspe, Germany, Löbe started his soccer career in the youth system of semi-professional club, Wuppertaler SV. He later moved to the United States to attend college at Fordham University, where he was a member of the varsity soccer team with his brother, Jannik. In 2017 he made four appearances for Canadian PDL side, K–W United, scoring three goals.

=== New York Red Bulls ===
On 11 January 2019, Löbe was drafted in the first round of the 2019 MLS SuperDraft, by the New York Red Bulls; becoming the third player from Fordham to be drafted in the club's history. He made his professional soccer debut with the New York Red Bulls II on 20 April 2019.

=== Miami FC ===
On 28 January 2020, Löbe signed for Miami FC ahead of the club's first season in the second division USL Championship. He made his debut for the team later that year against Atlanta United 2 on 30 July in a 4–3 loss.

== Career statistics ==
As of 4 November 2021

Appearances and goals by club, season and competition
Club	Season	League		Playoffs		Domestic Cup		International		Total	
Club	Season	Apps	Goals	Apps	Goals	Apps	Goals	Apps	Goals	Apps	Goals
Wuppertaler SV	2013–14	7	0	0	0	0	0	0	0	7	0
Wuppertaler SV	2014–15	16	0	0	0	1	0	0	0	17	0
Wuppertaler SV	Total	23	0	0	0	1	0	0	0	24	0
K–W United	2017	4	3	0	0	0	0	0	0	4	3
New York Red Bulls U-23	2018	2	1	0	0	0	0	0	0	2	1
New York Red Bulls II	2019	23	1	1	0	0	0	0	0	24	1
Miami FC	2020	15	0	0	0	0	0	0	0	15	0
Miami FC	2021	29	0	0	0	0	0	0	0	29	0
Miami FC	Total	44	0	0	0	0	0	0	0	44	0
Career total		96	5	1	0	1	0	0	0	98	5
