= Rhode Island Rams men's soccer =

American college soccer team

- Founded: 1961
- University: University of Rhode Island
- Head coach: Gareth Elliott (14th season)
- Conference: Atlantic 10
- Location: Kingston, Rhode Island, US
- Stadium: URI Soccer Complex (capacity: 2,500)
- Nickname: Rams, Rhody's
- Colors: Keaney blue, navy blue, and white
Home	Away

NCAA tournament Quarterfinals
- 1979

NCAA tournament Round of 16
- 1977, 1979, 2000

NCAA tournament appearances
- 1972, 1976, 1977, 1979, 1995, 1996, 1999, 2000, 2003, 2005, 2006, 2018, 2019

Conference tournament championships
- 1995, 1999, 2000, 2003, 2005, 2006, 2018, 2019

Conference regular season championships
- 1995, 1996, 1999, 2001, 2005, 2014, 2019

The Rhode Island Rams men's soccer team is an intercollegiate varsity sports team of the University of Rhode Island. The team competes in the Atlantic 10 Conference.

== Postseason results ==
=== NCAA tournament results ===
Rhode Island has appeared in 12 NCAA Tournaments. Their best performance was reaching the quarterfinals in 1979. Their most recent appearance was in 2006.

Year	Record	Seed	Region	Round	Opponent	Results
1972	6–4–1	—N/a	Boston	First round	Harvard	L 0–1
1976	9–4–0	—N/a	Hartford	First round	Connecticut	L 1–2
1977	9–3–1	—N/a	Clemson	First round Second round	Vermont; Brown	W 1–0; L 1–3
1979	12–3–1	—N/a	Hartford	Second round Quarterfinal	Connecticut; Columbia	W 3–2 OT; L 1–5
1995	19–1–2	—N/a	Charlottesville	First round	Virginia	L 1–2
1996	16–5–0	—N/a	Greensboro	First round	Hartford	L 2–3 OT
1999	17–3–1	—N/a	St. Louis	First round	Brown	L 1–2 OT
2000	16–5–1	—N/a	Chapel Hill	First round Second round	Boston College #1 North Carolina	W 3–0; L 1–3
2003	13–9–1	—N/a	Regional 3	First round	Connecticut	L 0–3
2005	13–7–2	—N/a	Regional 1	First round	Brown	L 1–2
2006	12–5–4	—N/a	Regional 1	First round Second round	Rutgers #16 Lehigh	T 1–1 (W 4–2 pen.); T 1–1 (L 4–5 pen.)
2018	15–5–0	—N/a	Regional 1	First round	UConn	L 3–4
2019	14–4–3	—N/a	Regional 1	First round	Syracuse	L 2–3

== Notable alumni ==
- Anthony Latronica
- Geoff Cameron
- Patrick Agyemang (soccer, born 2000)
- Stavros Zarokostas
- Danleigh Borman
- Paulo Dos Santos
- Simon Gatti
- Andy Williams
- Ross Smith
- Łukasz Tumicz
- Nicholas McCreath
- Dan McCrudden
- Sasha Gotsmanov
- Winston Griffiths
- Mick McDermott
- Michael Tanke
- Robert Meyer
- Andrew Kempe
