= Saint Joseph's Hawks men's soccer =

American college soccer team

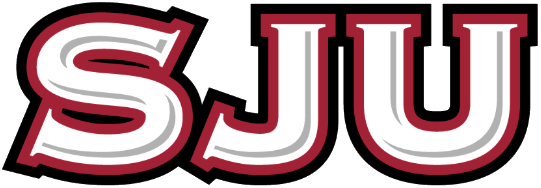
- Founded: 1958; 68 years ago
- University: Saint Joseph's University
- Head coach: Tim Mulqueen (1st season)
- Conference: A-10
- Location: Philadelphia, Pennsylvania, US
- Stadium: Sweeney Field (capacity: 3,000)
- Nickname: Hawks
- Colors: Crimson and gray
Home	Away

NCAA tournament Round of 16
- 1966

NCAA tournament appearances
- 1966, 1971, 1972

The Saint Joseph's Hawks men's soccer team is a varsity intercollegiate athletic team of Saint Joseph's University in Philadelphia, United States. The team is a member of the Atlantic 10 Conference, which is part of the National Collegiate Athletic Association's Division I. Saint Joseph's first men's soccer team was fielded in 1958. The team plays its home games at Sweeney Field in Philadelphia. The Hawks are coached by Tim Mulqueen.

== Squad ==
As of November 6, 2026

Note: Flags indicate national team as defined under FIFA eligibility rules; some limited exceptions apply. Players may hold more than one non-FIFA nationality.

No.	Pos.	Nation	Player
0	GK	USA	Alex Smith
00	GK	USA	Peter Morano
1	GK	USA	Cooper Jennings
2	FW	USA	Jake Ross
3	DF	USA	Diego Avelar
4	DF	UKR	Nick Hanushchak
5	MF	USA	Mason Csapo
6	DF	USA	Rob Myrick
7	MF	USA	Sebastian Perez-Gasiba
8	MF	USA	Conor Clair
9	FW	USA	Eddie Krupski
10	MF	CAN	Patrick Vani
11	FW	USA	Luke Johnson
12	DF	ITA	Mark Mazzoni
13	FW	DEN	Oskar Steinicke
14	MF	IRL	Finn Murray
15	FW	USA	Aidan Donnelly
16	MF	ITA	Matteo Mazzotta
17	FW	USA	Tommy Regan

No.	Pos.	Nation	Player
19	MF	USA	Aldo Hernandez
21	DF	USA	Logan LaMaina
22	DF	NOR	Herman Tveit-Reffsgaard
23	FW	BAN	Ronan Sullivan
24	DF	USA	Sean Boyle
25	MF	SRB	Marko Marić
26	DF	USA	Harrison Carolan
28	MF	USA	Connor Winters
29	FW	USA	Cristian Oliveira
30	FW	NED	Charlie Undorf
32	DF	USA	Sebastian Delacruz
33	DF	BAN	Declan Sullivan
34	MF	MEX	Juan Correa
35	FW	USA	Chase Lee
37	DF	USA	Bill Powers
38	MF	USA	Carter Courtney
39	DF	USA	Colin Priestley
40	MF	USA	Timmy Comey
88	GK	USA	Will Turk

== NCAA Tournament appearances ==
Saint Joseph's have appeared in three NCAA Tournaments. Their last tournament appearance came in 1972.

Season	Date	Round	Opponent	Result	Location
1966	November 22	First round	Navy	L 1–4	Annapolis, Maryland
1971	November 20	First round	Penn State	L 1–4	State College, Pennsylvania
1972	November 21	First round	Penn State	L 0–2	State College, Pennsylvania

== Facilities ==
=== Sweeney Field ===
Sweeney Field (previously called Finnesey Field) is a multi-use sports facility on the Saint Joseph's University campus in Philadelphia, Pennsylvania, which opened in 1929 and was originally planned to be the centerpiece to a 70,000 seat football stadium in the natural bowl of the campus.

== Coaching history ==
Saint Joseph's University has had five coaches in their program's existence.

Years	Coach	Games	W	L	T	Pct.
1958–1975	Jack Dunn	200	120	57	23	.658
1976–1986	Jack Ruggero	188	53	118	17	.327
1987–2009	Tom Turner	422	124	268	30	.329
2010–2024	Don D'Ambra	125	31	79	15	.308
2024-PRES	Tim Mulqueen	32	11	11	10	.500
