= 2013 NCAA Division I men's soccer season =

NCAA Division I
- Season: 2013
- Champions: Notre Dame
- Top goalscorer: 19 goals: (United States) Patrick Mullins; Maryland
- Biggest home win: Pitt 8–0 Howard (November 5)
- Biggest away win: FAU 0–6 Charlotte (October 30); Howard 0–6 NJIT (November 10)
- Highest scoring: 9 goals: New Mexico 7–2 'Nova (August 30); Wofford 4–5 G-Webb (August 30); Indiana 4–5 WVU (September 8); Delaware 4–5 SHall (September 11); Evansville 5–4 EIU (September 22); Pitt 9–0 Howard (November 5); William & Mary 6–3 UNCW (November 14)
- Highest attendance: 12,805; Cal Poly @ UCSB (November 9)
- Lowest attendance: 0 Delaware @ St. Peter's (September 20)*; Manhattan @ St. Peter's (October 16)*; Neutral Field — Several * — Official, but probably incorrect

The 2013 NCAA Division I men's soccer season was the 55th season of NCAA championship men's college soccer. There were 203 teams in men's Division I competition. The defending champions were the Indiana Hoosiers who defeated the Georgetown Hoyas in the 2012 College Cup. The season concluded with Notre Dame defeating Maryland 2–1 to win its first NCAA soccer title.

== Changes from 2012 ==
=== New programs ===
- Grand Canyon joined the WAC after previously playing in NCAA Division II.
- UMass Lowell joined the America East Conference after previously playing in NCAA Division II.
- Incarnate Word joined the Southland Conference, but is playing as an independent after having been an NCAA Division II member.

=== Discontinued programs ===
- Richmond dropped the sport, as well as men's track and field, following the school's decision to add men's lacrosse as a varsity sport.
- Mount St. Mary's dropped the sport, as well as men's and women's golf, for economic reasons.
- Towson dropped the sport due to budgetary concerns. Plans to cut baseball were delayed after late funding increases.

=== Programs leaving Division I ===
- Adelphi reclassified its men's soccer program to Division II, reuniting that team with the rest of its athletic program in the Northeast-10 Conference.

=== Conference realignment ===
School	Previous Conference	New Conference
Adelphi	Independent	Northeast-10 Conference (NCAA Division II)
Air Force	Mountain Pacific Sports Federation	Western Athletic Conference
Boston University	America East Conference	Patriot League
Butler	Atlantic 10 Conference	Big East Conference
Charlotte	Atlantic 10 Conference	Conference USA
Cincinnati	Big East Conference (1979–2013)	American Athletic Conference
College of Charleston	Southern Conference	Colonial Athletic Association
Connecticut	Big East Conference (1979–2013)	American Athletic Conference
Creighton	Missouri Valley Conference	Big East Conference
CSU Bakersfield	Mountain Pacific Sports Federation	Western Athletic Conference
Denver	Mountain Pacific Sports Federation	The Summit League
DePaul	Big East Conference (1979–2013)	Big East Conference
Florida Atlantic	Mid-American Conference	Conference USA
George Mason	Colonial Athletic Association	Atlantic 10 Conference
Georgetown	Big East Conference (1979–2013)	Big East Conference
Georgia State	Colonial Athletic Association	Independent
Grand Canyon	Pacific West Conference (NCAA Division II)	Western Athletic Conference
Houston Baptist	Mountain Pacific Sports Federation	Western Athletic Conference
Incarnate Word	Lone Star Conference (NCAA Division II)	Independent
Louisville	Big East Conference (1979–2013)	American Athletic Conference
Loyola (Chicago)	Horizon League	Missouri Valley Conference
Loyola (MD)	Metro Atlantic Athletic Conference	Patriot League
Marquette	Big East Conference (1979–2013)	Big East Conference
Memphis	Conference USA	American Athletic Conference
Monmouth	Northeast Conference	Metro Atlantic Athletic Conference
New Mexico	Mountain Pacific Sports Federation	Conference USA
Notre Dame	Big East Conference (1979–2013)	Atlantic Coast Conference
Oakland	The Summit League	Horizon League
Old Dominion	Colonial Athletic Association	Conference USA
Pittsburgh	Big East Conference (1979–2013)	Atlantic Coast Conference
Providence	Big East Conference (1979–2013)	Big East Conference
Quinnipiac	Northeast Conference	Metro Atlantic Athletic Conference
Rutgers	Big East Conference (1979–2013)	American Athletic Conference
St. John's	Big East Conference (1979–2013)	Big East Conference
San Jose State	Mountain Pacific Sports Federation	Western Athletic Conference
Seattle	Mountain Pacific Sports Federation	Western Athletic Conference
Seton Hall	Big East Conference (1979–2013)	Big East Conference
SMU	Conference USA	American Athletic Conference
South Florida	Big East Conference (1979–2013)	American Athletic Conference
Syracuse	Big East Conference (1979–2013)	Atlantic Coast Conference
Temple	Atlantic 10 Conference	American Athletic Conference
UCF	Conference USA	American Athletic Conference
UMass Lowell	Northeast-10 Conference (NCAA Division II)	America East Conference
UMKC	The Summit League	Western Athletic Conference
UNLV	Mountain Pacific Sports Federation	Western Athletic Conference
Villanova	Big East Conference (1979–2013)	Big East Conference
Xavier	Atlantic 10 Conference	Big East Conference

=== Conference changes ===
- The original Big East Conference split into two conferences. The schools that do not sponsor FBS football now operate as the Big East Conference under a new charter, while the FBS schools now operate under the original Big East charter with the new name of American Athletic Conference. Both conferences sponsor soccer.
- The Mountain Pacific Sports Federation dropped men's soccer.
- The Western Athletic Conference added men's soccer, with several ex-MPSF teams joining the conference for 2013

== Season overview ==
=== Pre-season polls ===
Several American soccer outlets posted their own preseason top 25 rankings of what were believed to be the strongest men's collegiate soccer teams entering 2013.

NSCAA
Rank	Team
1	Indiana
2	Maryland
3	Georgetown
4	North Carolina
5	Connecticut
6	Creighton
7	Notre Dame
8	Akron
9	UCLA
10	Louisville
11	New Mexico
12	Marquette
13	Coastal Carolina
14	Tulsa
15	Saint Louis
16	San Diego
17	Wake Forest
18	Brown
19	Northwestern
20	Syracuse
21	Charlotte
22	Cornell
23	Washington
24	VCU
25	Virginia

College Soccer News
Rank	Team
1	Indiana
2	Georgetown
3	Maryland
4	Creighton
5	North Carolina
6	Connecticut
7	UCLA
8	Marquette
9	Akron
10	Saint Louis
11	Notre Dame
12	San Diego
13	UC Santa Barbara
14	Virginia
15	Tulsa
16	Northwestern
17	Coastal Carolina
18	Wake Forest
19	Louisville
20	New Mexico
21	St. John's
22	Xavier
23	Washington
24	Charlotte
25	Michigan State

Soccer America
Rank	Team
1	Maryland
2	Indiana
3	Georgetown
4	Connecticut
5	Creighton
6	North Carolina
7	Notre Dame
8	Saint Louis
9	New Mexico
10	Marquette
11	Akron
12	Wake Forest
13	UCLA
14	Louisville
15	Coastal Carolina
16	Tulsa
17	Syracuse
18	Charlotte
19	St. John's
20	Virginia
21	San Diego
22	Northwestern
23	UC Santa Barbara
24	Michigan State
25	Xavier

SoccerTimes.com
Rank	Team
1	Indiana
2	Maryland
3	Georgetown
4	North Carolina
5	Creighton
6	Connecticut
7	Notre Dame
8	Akron
9	Louisville
10	UCLA
11	New Mexico
12	Marquette
13	Tulsa
14t	Saint Louis
14t	Wake Forest
16	Coastal Carolina
17	Northwestern
18	San Diego
19	Syracuse
20	Charlotte
21	Brown
22	Washington
23	Virginia
24	St. John's
25	Xavier

Top Drawer Soccer
Rank	Team
1	Indiana
2	Maryland
3	Georgetown
4	North Carolina
5	Connecticut
6	New Mexico
7	UCLA
8	Louisville
9	Marquette
10	Creighton
11	Akron
12	Wake Forest
13	Tulsa
14	Virginia
15	Michigan
16	Notre Dame
17	Coastal Carolina
18	Saint Louis
19	Northwestern
20	Stanford
21	Washington
22	Charlotte
23	VCU
24	Syracuse
25	Cornell

College Sports Madness
Rank	Team
1	Maryland
2	North Carolina
3	UCLA
4	Indiana
5	Georgetown
6	Creighton
7	Virginia
8	Wake Forest
9	Marquette
10	Notre Dame
11	Connecticut
12	Akron
13	St. Louis
14	Charlotte
15	Michigan
16	Tulsa
17	Northwestern
18	Coastal Carolina
19	New Mexico
20	St. John's
21	Stanford
22	Michigan State
23	Kentucky
24	VCU
25	Louisville

== Regular season ==
=== Standings ===
2013 America East men's soccer standings
	Conf.					Overall
Team	W		L		T	W		L		T
No. 14 UMBC ‡	5	–	0	–	2	16	–	1	–	3
New Hampshire	5	–	2	–	0	12	–	5	–	1
Hartford	4	–	2	–	1	13	–	4	–	4
Vermont	3	–	3	–	1	9	–	5	–	4
Albany	3	–	3	–	1	6	–	11	–	4
Binghamton	1	–	3	–	3	3	–	11	–	5
Stony Brook	1	–	5	–	1	6	–	10	–	1
UMass Lowell #	1	–	5	–	1	3	–	14	–	1
‡ - Tournament champion + - Invited to the NCAA Division I Men's Soccer Championship # - Ineligible (In transition); As of December 17, 2013; Rankings from NCSAA

2013 American Athletic Conference men's soccer standings
	Conf.					Overall
Team	W		L		T	W		L		T
No. 18 Louisville +	5	–	1	–	2	11	–	5	–	4
No. 9 Connecticut +	4	–	0	–	4	12	–	3	–	8
UCF	4	–	1	–	3	8	–	5	–	5
Temple	3	–	1	–	4	10	–	4	–	4
South Florida ‡	2	–	2	–	4	8	–	4	–	9
Memphis	3	–	5	–	0	9	–	8	–	1
SMU	2	–	4	–	2	3	–	12	–	2
Rutgers	2	–	5	–	1	7	–	11	–	2
Cincinnati	1	–	7	–	0	6	–	12	–	1
‡ - Tournament champion + - Invited to the NCAA Division I Men's Soccer Championship; As of December 17, 2013 (UTC); Rankings from NSCAA

2013 Atlantic 10 Conference men's soccer standings
	Conf.					Overall
Team	W		L		T	W		L		T
Saint Louis	6	–	0	–	2	14	–	5	–	2
George Mason ‡	5	–	0	–	3	12	–	3	–	6
VCU +	5	–	2	–	1	11	–	8	–	2
La Salle	5	–	2	–	1	8	–	8	–	4
Dayton	4	–	2	–	2	14	–	2	–	3
Duquesne	4	–	3	–	1	9	–	8	–	1
Massachusetts	3	–	5	–	0	4	–	14	–	1
Saint Joseph's	3	–	5	–	0	5	–	8	–	6
George Washington	2	–	4	–	2	5	–	10	–	2
St. Bonaventure	2	–	5	–	1	8	–	9	–	2
Fordham	2	–	5	–	1	5	–	11	–	1
Rhode Island	0	–	8	–	0	2	–	14	–	0
‡ - Tournament champion + - Invited to the NCAA Division I Men's Soccer Championship; As of November 25, 2013; Rankings from NSCAA

2013 ACC men's soccer standings
	Conf.						Overall
Team	W		L		T	PCT	W		L		T	PCT
No. 1 Notre Dame + ‍‍‍	7	–	1	–	3	.773	17	–	1	–	6	.833
No. 2 Maryland ‡ ‍‍‍	7	–	1	–	3	.773	17	–	4	–	5	.750
No. 11 Wake Forest + ‍‍‍	6	–	1	–	4	.727	10	–	6	–	5	.595
North Carolina + ‍‍‍	4	–	2	–	5	.591	9	–	6	–	5	.575
Clemson + ‍‍‍	5	–	4	–	2	.545	11	–	7	–	3	.595
No. 3 Virginia + ‍‍‍	4	–	3	–	4	.545	13	–	6	–	5	.646
Duke ‍‍‍	3	–	3	–	5	.500	8	–	5	–	6	.579
Boston College ‍‍‍	4	–	6	–	1	.409	7	–	9	–	2	.444
NC State ‍‍‍	3	–	5	–	3	.409	8	–	5	–	4	.588
Syracuse ‍‍‍	3	–	7	–	1	.318	10	–	7	–	1	.583
Virginia Tech ‍‍‍	1	–	5	–	5	.318	4	–	8	–	5	.382
Pittsburgh ‍‍‍	0	–	8	–	2	.100	1	–	11	–	4	.188
‡ - Tournament champion + - Invited to the NCAA Division I Men's Soccer Championship; As of November 25, 2013; Rankings from NSCAA

2013 Atlantic Sun Conference men's soccer standings
	Conf.					Overall
Team	W		L		T	W		L		T
Florida Gulf Coast	6	–	1	–	1	8	–	7	–	2
East Tennessee State ‡	5	–	2	–	1	10	–	6	–	4
Northern Kentucky #	5	–	2	–	1	9	–	4	–	6
Lipscomb	4	–	3	–	1	9	–	9	–	2
Mercer	3	–	4	–	1	5	–	14	–	1
North Florida	2	–	4	–	2	8	–	7	–	3
Jacksonville	2	–	4	–	2	4	–	11	–	3
Stetson	2	–	4	–	2	3	–	10	–	4
USC Upstate	1	–	6	–	1	1	–	11	–	2
‡ - Tournament champion + - Invited to the NCAA Division I Men's Soccer Championship # - Ineligible (In transition); As of November 21, 2013; Rankings from NSCAA

2013 Big East men's soccer standings
	Conf.					Overall
Team	W		L		T	W		L		T
No. 10 Georgetown +	6	–	2	–	1	14	–	5	–	2
No. 12 Marquette ‡	6	–	2	–	1	13	–	6	–	2
Providence +	6	–	3	–	0	11	–	6	–	4
Xavier	6	–	3	–	0	10	–	6	–	2
Creighton +	4	–	4	–	1	9	–	9	–	2
Butler	4	–	5	–	0	10	–	8	–	1
St. John's +	3	–	4	–	2	11	–	7	–	2
Villanova	3	–	6	–	0	8	–	9	–	1
Seton Hall	3	–	6	–	0	7	–	9	–	2
DePaul	1	–	7	–	1	5	–	11	–	2
‡ - Tournament champion + - Invited to the NCAA Division I Men's Soccer Championship; As of December 17, 2013; Rankings from NCSAA

2013 Big South men's soccer standings
	Conf.					Overall
Team	W		L		T	W		L		T
No. 15 Coastal Carolina ‡	9	–	1	–	0	19	–	5	–	0
High Point	6	–	2	–	2	8	–	8	–	3
Longwood	6	–	3	–	1	7	–	9	–	4
Gardner–Webb	6	–	4	–	0	9	–	8	–	1
Radford	5	–	3	–	2	9	–	7	–	4
Campbell	5	–	4	–	1	5	–	10	–	4
Winthrop	5	–	5	–	0	11	–	7	–	1
Liberty	5	–	5	–	0	11	–	9	–	0
UNC Asheville	2	–	8	–	0	5	–	14	–	0
VMI	2	–	8	–	0	3	–	14	–	1
Presbyterian	1	–	9	–	0	3	–	15	–	0
‡ - Tournament champion + - Invited to the NCAA Division I Men's Soccer Championship; As of December 17, 2013; Rankings from NSCAA

2013 Big Ten Conference men's soccer standings
	Conf.					Overall
Team	W		L		T	W		L		T
No. 16 Penn State +	5	–	1	–	0	13	–	6	–	2
No. 19 Wisconsin +	4	–	2	–	0	13	–	5	–	2
No. 7 Michigan State +	3	–	2	–	1	14	–	6	–	3
Michigan	3	–	3	–	0	8	–	7	–	3
Indiana ‡	2	–	4	–	0	8	–	12	–	2
Ohio State	1	–	3	–	2	5	–	8	–	5
Northwestern +	1	–	4	–	1	10	–	8	–	3
‡ - Tournament champion + - Invited to the NCAA Division I Men's Soccer Championship; As of December 17, 2013 (UTC); Rankings from NSCAA

2013 Big West Conference men's soccer standings
	Conf.					Overall
Team	W		L		T	W		L		T
North
No. 20 UCSB +	7	–	0	–	3	12	–	6	–	3
UC Davis	4	–	4	–	2	9	–	9	–	3
Cal Poly	3	–	5	–	2	10	–	9	–	2
Sacramento State	1	–	8	–	1	3	–	11	–	4
South
No. 13 UC Irvine ‡	7	–	2	–	1	15	–	5	–	3
No. 24 CSU Northridge +	5	–	4	–	1	15	–	7	–	1
UC Riverside	4	–	5	–	1	9	–	8	–	3
CSU Fullerton	3	–	6	–	1	6	–	11	–	1
‡ - Tournament champion + - Invited to the NCAA Division I Men's Soccer Championship; As of December 17, 2013; Rankings from NSCAA

2013 CAA men's soccer standings
	Conf.					Overall
Team	W		L		T	W		L		T
Drexel ‡	4	–	1	–	2	9	–	8	–	4
William & Mary +	4	–	2	–	1	11	–	5	–	3
UNC Wilmington	4	–	2	–	1	9	–	6	–	2
Delaware +	4	–	3	–	0	14	–	5	–	1
Northeastern	3	–	3	–	1	6	–	9	–	3
Hofstra	2	–	3	–	2	8	–	7	–	3
Charleston	2	–	4	–	1	4	–	11	–	1
James Madison	1	–	6	–	0	6	–	10	–	1
‡ - Tournament champion + - Invited to the NCAA Division I Men's Soccer Championship; As of December 17, 2013; Rankings from NSCAA

2013 Conference USA men's soccer standings
	Conf.					Overall
Team	W		L		T	W		L		T
No. 4 New Mexico +	7	–	1	–	1	14	–	6	–	2
Old Dominion +	7	–	2	–	0	11	–	6	–	1
UAB	5	–	3	–	1	12	–	5	–	1
South Carolina	4	–	2	–	3	7	–	7	–	5
No. 23 Charlotte ‡	4	–	3	–	2	12	–	6	–	3
Tulsa	4	–	3	–	2	11	–	6	–	3
Kentucky	3	–	4	–	2	7	–	10	–	3
FIU	2	–	6	–	1	6	–	10	–	1
Florida Atlantic	1	–	7	–	1	7	–	7	–	2
Marshall	0	–	6	–	3	2	–	11	–	6
‡ - Tournament champion + - Invited to the NCAA Division I Men's Soccer Championship; As of December 17, 2013 (UTC); Rankings from NSCAA

2013 Horizon League men's soccer standings
	Conf.					Overall
Team	W		L		T	W		L		T
UIC	7	–	0	–	0	16	–	4	–	0
Milwaukee ‡	5	–	2	–	0	15	–	3	–	2
Oakland	4	–	2	–	1	7	–	7	–	6
Cleveland State	3	–	4	–	0	8	–	12	–	0
Wright State	3	–	4	–	0	6	–	11	–	2
Valparaiso	2	–	3	–	2	5	–	8	–	5
Green Bay	2	–	4	–	1	7	–	7	–	3
Detroit	0	–	7	–	0	3	–	11	–	4
‡ - Tournament champion + - Invited to the NCAA Division I Men's Soccer Championship; As of November 21, 2013; Rankings from NSCAA

2013 Division I men's soccer independents soccer records
	Conf.			Overall
Team	W	L	T	W		L		T
Georgia State		–		9	–	9	–	1
Incarnate Word #		–		6	–	7	–	1
Belmont		–		6	–	10	–	2
NJIT		–		7	–	9	–	2
Howard		–		1	–	17	–	0
+ - Invited to the NCAA Division I Men's Soccer Championship # - Ineligible (In transition); As of November 17, 2013; Rankings from NSCAA

2013 Ivy League men's soccer standings
	Conf.					Overall
Team	W		L		T	W		L		T
Penn ‡	5	–	1	–	1	8	–	8	–	2
Harvard	5	–	2	–	0	7	–	8	–	2
Princeton	4	–	2	–	1	7	–	9	–	1
Brown	3	–	2	–	2	7	–	7	–	3
Yale	2	–	3	–	2	4	–	11	–	2
Cornell	2	–	4	–	1	8	–	5	–	4
Columbia	1	–	3	–	3	8	–	6	–	3
Dartmouth	1	–	6	–	0	6	–	7	–	4
‡ - Conference champion + - Invited to the NCAA Division I Men's Soccer Championship; As of November 21, 2013; Rankings from NSCAA

2013 MAAC men's soccer standings
	Conf.					Overall
Team	W		L		T	W		L		T
Quinnipiac ‡	7	–	1	–	2	9	–	5	–	7
Monmouth	7	–	1	–	2	8	–	6	–	6
Iona	7	–	2	–	1	10	–	6	–	3
Fairfield	5	–	3	–	2	8	–	5	–	3
Manhattan	5	–	3	–	2	5	–	10	–	3
Rider	3	–	6	–	1	8	–	9	–	1
Canisius	3	–	6	–	1	7	–	9	–	2
Siena	3	–	6	–	1	7	–	10	–	1
Niagara	3	–	6	–	1	5	–	12	–	1
Saint Peter's	2	–	5	–	3	4	–	9	–	5
Marist	2	–	8	–	0	3	–	15	–	0
‡ - Tournament champion + - Invited to the NCAA Division I Men's Soccer Championship; As of November 21, 2013; Rankings from NSCAA

2013 Mid-American Conference men's soccer standings
	Conf.					Overall
Team	W		L		T	W		L		T
No. 17 Akron ‡	5	–	1	–	0	17	–	4	–	1
Western Michigan	4	–	1	–	1	9	–	9	–	1
Hartwick	3	–	2	–	1	5	–	9	–	4
West Virginia	2	–	2	–	2	7	–	7	–	5
Bowling Green	2	–	2	–	2	6	–	7	–	6
Buffalo	1	–	4	–	1	3	–	11	–	4
Northern Illinois	0	–	5	–	1	4	–	13	–	1
‡ - Tournament champion + - Invited to the NCAA Division I Men's Soccer Championship; As of December 17, 2013; Rankings from NSCAA

2013 Missouri Valley Conference men's soccer standings
	Conf.					Overall
Team	W		L		T	W		L		T
Missouri State	5	–	1	–	0	11	–	5	–	2
Drake	3	–	1	–	2	8	–	8	–	4
Bradley ‡	3	–	2	–	1	14	–	7	–	2
SIU Edwardsville	3	–	3	–	0	8	–	9	–	2
Loyola Chicago	2	–	3	–	1	6	–	11	–	2
Evansville	2	–	4	–	0	10	–	8	–	1
Central Arkansas	0	–	4	–	2	4	–	11	–	2
‡ - Tournament champion + - Invited to the NCAA Division I Men's Soccer Championship; Rankings from November 25, 2013 NSCAA

2013 Northeast Conference men's soccer standings
	Conf.					Overall
Team	W		L		T	W		L		T
Central Connecticut	6	–	1	–	0	9	–	9	–	1
Saint Francis (PA)	4	–	2	–	1	11	–	4	–	4
Bryant	4	–	2	–	1	7	–	9	–	2
St. Francis Brooklyn ‡	4	–	3	–	0	12	–	6	–	1
Fairleigh Dickinson	2	–	4	–	1	9	–	8	–	1
LIU Brooklyn	2	–	4	–	1	5	–	10	–	2
Robert Morris	2	–	5	–	0	8	–	8	–	2
Sacred Heart	2	–	5	–	0	5	–	13	–	0
‡ - Tournament champion + - Invited to the NCAA Division I Men's Soccer Championship; As of November 21, 2013; Rankings from NSCAA

2013 Pac-12 men's soccer standings
	Conf.					Overall
Team	W		L		T	W		L		T
No. 5 Washington ‡	7	–	1	–	2	16	–	2	–	4
No. 8 UCLA +	6	–	1	–	3	12	–	3	–	5
No. 6 California +	6	–	3	–	1	14	–	5	–	2
No. 21 Stanford +	3	–	5	–	2	10	–	7	–	4
San Diego State	2	–	5	–	2	5	–	11	–	2
Oregon State	0	–	8	–	2	7	–	10	–	2
‡ - Conference champion + - Invited to the NCAA Division I Men's Soccer Championship; As of December 17, 2013 (UTC); Rankings from NSCAA

2013 Patriot League men's soccer standings
	Conf.					Overall
Team	W		L		T	W		L		T
No. 25 Navy ‡	9	–	0	–	0	16	–	4	–	2
Army	6	–	2	–	1	12	–	3	–	3
Holy Cross	6	–	3	–	0	9	–	9	–	2
Bucknell	5	–	3	–	1	13	–	7	–	1
American	4	–	3	–	2	7	–	8	–	5
Colgate	3	–	5	–	1	4	–	14	–	2
Boston U.	3	–	6	–	0	6	–	10	–	1
Lafayette	2	–	5	–	2	4	–	6	–	8
Loyola (MD)	2	–	6	–	1	7	–	8	–	2
Lehigh	1	–	8	–	0	2	–	14	–	1
‡ - Tournament champion + - Invited to the NCAA Division I Men's Soccer Championship; As of December 17, 2013; Rankings from NSCAA

2013 Southern Conference men's soccer standings
	Conf.					Overall
Team	W		L		T	W		L		T
Wofford	5	–	1	–	0	11	–	7	–	1
No. 22 Elon ‡	4	–	2	–	0	15	–	5	–	3
UNC Greensboro	3	–	2	–	1	8	–	9	–	2
Furman	2	–	2	–	2	11	–	5	–	2
Georgia Southern	2	–	4	–	0	9	–	10	–	0
Davidson	2	–	4	–	0	8	–	10	–	1
Appalachian State	1	–	4	–	1	4	–	7	–	7
‡ - Tournament champion + - Invited to the NCAA Division I Men's Soccer Championship; As of December 17, 2013; Rankings from NSCAA

2013 The Summit League men's soccer standings
	Conf.					Overall
Team	W		L		T	W		L		T
Denver ‡	6	–	0	–	0	13	–	3	–	4
Oral Roberts	3	–	2	–	1	6	–	8	–	4
Omaha #	3	–	3	–	0	6	–	9	–	1
Western Illinois	3	–	3	–	0	6	–	13	–	0
IUPUI	2	–	2	–	2	2	–	12	–	5
Eastern Illinois	1	–	4	–	1	1	–	14	–	2
IPFW	1	–	5	–	0	1	–	15	–	1
‡ - Tournament champion + - Invited to the NCAA Division I Men's Soccer Championship # - Ineligible (In transition); As of November 21, 2013; Rankings from NSCAA

2013 West Coast Conference men's soccer standings
	Conf.					Overall
Team	W		L		T	W		L		T
Loyola Marymount ‡	9	–	2	–	1	13	–	4	–	3
Santa Clara	8	–	4	–	0	11	–	9	–	0
Gonzaga	5	–	4	–	3	10	–	6	–	3
Saint Mary's	5	–	5	–	2	7	–	9	–	4
San Francisco	4	–	7	–	1	7	–	11	–	2
Portland	4	–	8	–	0	9	–	11	–	0
San Diego	2	–	7	–	3	6	–	10	–	4
‡ - Conference champion + - Invited to the NCAA Division I Men's Soccer Championship; As of November 21, 2013; Rankings from NSCAA

2013 Western Athletic Conference men's soccer standings
	Conf.					Overall
Team	W		L		T	W		L		T
Seattle ‡	7	–	0	–	3	11	–	9	–	3
Cal State Bakersfield	6	–	3	–	1	9	–	9	–	2
UNLV	5	–	4	–	1	7	–	10	–	2
Air Force	3	–	2	–	5	4	–	11	–	5
Houston Baptist	4	–	4	–	2	9	–	7	–	2
UMKC	3	–	6	–	1	4	–	10	–	4
San Jose State	3	–	6	–	1	4	–	13	–	4
Grand Canyon #	2	–	8	–	0	4	–	13	–	1
‡ - Tournament champion + - Invited to the NCAA Division I Men's Soccer Championship # - Ineligible (In transition); As of November 25, 2012; Rankings from NSCAA

=== Major upsets ===
In this list, a "major upset" is defined as a game won by a team ranked 10 or more spots lower or an unranked team that defeats a team ranked #15 or higher.

Date	Winner	Score	Loser
August 30	@ California	2–0	#3 Georgetown
August 30	@ Milwaukee	2–1	#12 Marquette
September 1	@ California	3–2 (ot)	#2 Maryland
September 3	UNC Greensboro	1–0	@ #15 Charlotte
September 5	Cal Poly	3–0	@ #6 UCLA
September 6	@ #18 UAB	2–1 (ot)	# 8 Indiana
September 6	@ #23 St. John's	2–1 (2ot)	#5 Akron
September 7	Butler	1–0	@ #7 Louisville
September 8	West Virginia	5–4 (2ot)	@ #8 Indiana
September 8	VCU	3–2	@ #13 Maryland
September 11	@ Evansville	2–1	#6 Saint Louis
September 13	#19 VCU	1–0	@ #7 Akron
September 14	Bradley	1–0	@ #2 Connecticut
September 15	@ William & Mary	3–2 (2ot)	#1 Creighton
September 15	ETSU	1–0	@ #8 UAB
September 17	@ #24 Elon	1–0	#9 Wake Forest
September 17	@ Syracuse	1–0	#12 Connecticut
September 19	@ UC Irvine	3–0	#11 UCLA
September 20	Drake	1–0	@ #14 New Mexico
September 21	Coastal Carolina	1–0	@ #8 VCU
September 24	William & Mary	1–0	@ #1 North Carolina
September 28	Old Dominion	2–1	@ #15 Tulsa
October 1	Delaware	1–0 (2 ot)	@ #7 UMBC
October 1	@ Fairleigh Dickenson	2–1 (ot)	#14 St. John's
October 2	@ #22 Saint Louis	1–0	#4 Creighton
October 2	Bradley	3–2 (ot)	@ #5 Northwestern
October 5	Hartwick	2–0	@ #9 Akron
October 5	Providence	1–0	@ #14 St. John's
October 6	Michigan State	3–2 (2ot)	@ #5 Northwestern
October 11	UC Santa Barbara	2–1	@ #4 Cal State Northridge
October 12	@ Marquette	1–0	#7 Creighton
October 12	@ Xavier	2–1	#9 Georgetown
October 12	Old Dominion	3–2 (ot)	#10 UAB
October 15	@ Michigan	1–0	#12 Creighton
October 19	Villanova	1–0	@ #12 Creighton
October 22	@ Charlotte	3–1	#14 Clemson
October 23	@ Cincinnati	2–0	#6 Louisville
October 23	@ Georgia State	2–0	#11 Furman
October 25	San Diego	1–0	@ #1 California
October 26	#23 Virginia	2–0	@ #2 Notre Dame
October 26	UC Irvine	1–0	@ #5 Cal State Northridge
October 29	@ Elon	2–1	#6 Coastal Carolina
October 29	Georgia Southern	2–1 (ot)	@ #14 Furman
October 30	@ New Mexico	4–3	#10 UAB
November 1	North Carolina	1–0	@ #15 Virginia
November 2	@ St. John's	1–0	#5 Georgetown
November 2	@ UNC Asheville	1–0	#6 Coastal Carolina
November 2	@ Ohio State	1–0 (2ot)	#9 Penn State
November 2	UC Riverside	1–0	@ #13 Cal State Northridge
November 2	Wofford	2–0	@ #14 Furman
November 3	South Carolina	2–1	@ #10 UAB
November 8	@ DePaul	2–1	#10 Marquette
November 9	@ Rutgers	1–0	#7 Louisville
November 13	@ Stanford	2–1 (ot)	#5 California
November 13	Northwestern	2–1	#13 Wisconsin
November 13	@ Charlotte	2–1	#15 UAB
November 15	Providence	0–0 (PKs)	#7 Georgetown
November 15	#25 Cal State Northridge	3–2	@ #10 UC Santa Barbara
November 17	South Florida	0–0 (PKs)	#11 UConn

=== Conference regular season and tournament winners ===
Conference	Regular season champion	Conference Tournament	Tournament Venue (City)	Tournament Champion
America East	UMBC	2013 America East Men's Soccer Tournament	Higher seed	UMBC
American Athletic	Louisville	2013 American Athletic Men's Soccer Tournament	Toyota Stadium (Frisco, TX)	South Florida
Atlantic Coast	Notre Dame & Maryland	2013 ACC Men's Soccer Tournament	Maryland SoccerPlex (Boyds, MD)	Maryland
Atlantic 10	Saint Louis	2013 Atlantic 10 Men's Soccer Tournament	Baujan Field (Dayton, OH)	George Mason
Atlantic Sun	FGCU	2013 Atlantic Sun Men's Soccer Tournament	Higher seed	East Tennessee State
Big East	Georgetown & Marquette	2013 Big East Men's Soccer Tournament	PPL Park (Chester, PA)	Marquette
Big South	Coastal Carolina	2013 Big South Conference Men's Soccer Tournament	Bryan Park (Greensboro, NC)	Coastal Carolina
Big Ten	Penn State	2013 Big Ten Conference Men's Soccer Tournament	Columbus Crew Stadium (Columbus, OH)	Indiana
Big West	UC Santa Barbara—North; UC Irvine—South	2013 Big West Conference Men's Soccer Tournament	Higher seed	UC Irvine
Colonial	Drexel	2013 CAA Men's Soccer Tournament	Vidas Field @ Drexel University (Philadelphia, PA)	Drexel
Conference USA	New Mexico	2013 Conference USA Men's Soccer Tournament	Transamerica Field (Charlotte, NC)	Charlotte
Horizon	UIC	2013 Horizon League Men's Soccer Tournament	Titan Field; Detroit, MI	Milwaukee
Ivy	Penn	No tournament		
Metro Atlantic	Monmouth & Quinnipiac	2013 MAAC Men's Soccer Tournament	Tenney Stadium (Poughkeepsie, NY)	Quinnipiac
Mid-American	Akron	2013 MAC Men's Soccer Tournament	FirstEnergy Stadium (Akron, OH)	Akron
Missouri Valley	Missouri State	2013 Missouri Valley Conference Men's Soccer Tournament	Shea Stadium (Peoria, IL)	Bradley
Northeast	Central Connecticut	2013 Northeast Conference Men's Soccer Tournament	CCSU Field (New Britain, CT)	St. Francis Brooklyn
Pac-12	Washington	No tournament		
Patriot	Navy	2013 Patriot League Men's Soccer Tournament	Riggs Field (Washington, D.C.)	Navy
Southern	Wofford	2013 Southern Conference Men's Soccer Tournament	WakeMed Soccer Park (Cary, NC)	Elon
Summit	Denver	2013 The Summit League Men's Soccer Tournament	John MacKenzie Alumni Field (Macomb, IL)	Denver
West Coast	Loyola Marymount	No tournament		
WAC	Seattle	2013 Western Athletic Conference Men's Soccer Tournament	Air Force Soccer Stadium {Colorado Springs, CO)	Seattle

== Statistics ==
=== Individuals ===
GOALS
Rank	Scorer	School	Games	Goals
1	(United States) Patrick Mullins	Maryland	26	19
2	(United States) Denzel Clarke	Gardner-Webb	18	16
	(Israel) Sagi Lev-Ari	Cal St. Northridge	23	16
4	(Spain) Guillermo Delgado	Delaware	20	15
	(Mexico) Miguel Gonzalez	Seattle	24	15
6	(Jamaica) Neco Brett	Robert Morris	18	14
	(Canada) Cyle Larin	UConn	22	14
	(United States) Mackenzie Pridham	Cal Poly	20	14
9	(England) Laurie Bell	Milwaukee	20	13
	(United States) Kevin Correa	St. Francis Brooklyn	19	13
	(United States) Pete Caringi	UMBC	19	13
	(United States) Ricky Garbanzo	Coastal Carolina	24	13

Last weekly update on December 16, 2013. Source: NCAA.com – Total Goals

GOALS AGAINST AVERAGE
Rank	Keeper	School	Games	Minutes	GA	GAA
1	(United States) Eric Klenofsky	Monmouth	13	1229	3	.220
2	(United States) Gavin Snyder	Navy	16	1458	6	.370
3	(United States) Trevor Spangenberg	Missouri State	18	1735	8	.415
4	(Mexico) Tomas Gomez	Georgetown	21	1860	9	.435
5	(United States) Winston Boldt	Army	18	1728	10	.521
6	(United States) Travis Worra	New Hampshire	12	1139	7	.553
7	(United States) Zach Zagorski	Cornell	11	1052	7	.599
8	(United States) Brendan Moore	North Carolina	20	1930	13	.606
9	(Antigua and Barbuda) Brentton Muhammad	South Florida	20	1029	14	.621
10	(United States) Fernando Pina	Akron	18	1731	12	.624

Last weekly update on December 16, 2013. Source: NCAA.com – Goals Against Average

ASSISTS
Rank	Player	School	Games	Assists
1	(Croatia) Faik Hajderovic	Evansville	19	14
	(Poland) Wojciech Wojcik	Bradley	23	14
3	(United States) Franklin Castellanos	Iona	19	13
4	(Bermuda) Zeiko Lewis	Boston College	18	11
	(United States) John McFarlin	Loyola Marymount	18	11
	(United States) Billy Padula	Wofford	19	11
7	(United States) Jeff Adkins	Butler	20	10
	(Spain) Adria Beso	UConn	23	10
	(Republic of Ireland) Liam Collins	Memphis	18	10
	(United States) Ross Friedman	Harvard	17	10
	(United States) Michael Harris	Washington	22	10
	(Germany) Jason Plumhoff	LaSalle	20	10
	(United States) Martin Sanchez	Navy	22	10
	(United States) Harry Shipp	Notre Dame	24	10

Last weekly update on December 16, 2013. Source: NCAA.com – Total Assists

SAVE PERCENTAGE
Rank	Keeper	School	Games	Saves	GA	Save %
1	(United States) Gavin Snyder	Navy	16	66	6	.917
2	(United States) Eric Klenofsky	Monmouth	13	32	3	.914
3	(United States) Winston Boldt	Army	18	79	10	.888
4	(United States) Travis Worra	New Hampshire	12	53	7	.883
5	(United States) Tomas Gomez	Georgetown	21	67	9	.882
6	(Russia) Alex Ivanov	Ohio State	17	110	15	.880
7	(United States) Zach Bennett	Michigan State	23	120	17	.878
8	(United States) Daniel Valcicak	St.Francis (PA)	17	74	12	.860
9	(United States) Dan Scheck	Temple	18	79	13	.859
10	(United States) Michael Lansing	Bucknell	17	75	13	.852

Last weekly update on December 16, 2013. Source: NCAA.com – Save pct

TOTAL POINTS
Rank	Player	School	Games	Goals	Assists	Points
1	(United States) Patrick Mullins	Maryland	26	19	8	46
2	(Israel) Sagi Lev-Ari	Cal State Northridge	23	16	6	38
3	(Jamaica) Neco Brett	Robert Morris	18	14	8	36
4	(Spain) Guillermo Delgado	Delaware	20	15	5	35
	(United States) Miguel Gonzalez	Seattle	24	15	5	35
6	(United States) Denzel Clarke	Gardner-Webb	18	16	2	34
	(United States) Harrison Shipp	Notre Dame	24	12	10	34
8	(United States) Kevin Correa	St. Francis Brooklyn	19	13	6	32
	(Germany) Jason Plumhoff	LaSalle	20	11	10	32
10	(United States) Franklin Castellanos	Iona	19	9	13	31
	(Canada) Cyle Larin	UConn	23	14	3	31
	(United States) Mackenzie Pridham	Cal Poly	23	12	7	31
	(United States) Jason Waterman	Elon	19	9	13	31

Last weekly update on December 16, 2013. Source: NCAA.com – Total Points

TOTAL SAVES
Rank	Keeper	School	Games	Saves
1	(United States) Jake Feener	Seattle	24	161
2	(United States) Zach Bennett	Michigan State	23	120
3	(United States) Neal Bates	Georgia Southern	19	117
4	(United States) John McCarthy	LaSalle	19	116
5	(United States) Alex Ivanov	Ohio State	17	110
6	(United States) David Greczek	Rutgers	20	108
7	(United States) Brian Billings	Bradley	22	107
8	(United States) Stefano Frantellizzi	Binghamton	19	106
9	(United States) Eric Hamilton	Howard	17	104
10	(United States) Dan Jackson	UNC Asheville	18	103

Last weekly update on December 16, 2013. Source: NCAA.com – Total Saves

=== Teams ===
SCORING OFFENSE
Rank	School	Games	Goals	Goals/Game
1	UAB	18	43	2.39
2	Delaware	20	45	2.25
3	Wofford	19	42	2.21
4	Dayton	19	41	2.16
5	Winthrop	19	40	2.11
6	St. Louis	21	44	2.10
7	UMBC	20	41	2.05
8	Cal Poly	21	43	2.048
9	Washington	22	45	2.045
8	Maryland	26	53	2.038

Last weekly update on December 16, 2013. Source: NCAA.com – Goals/Game

SCORING DEFENSE (Team Goals Against Average)
Rank	School	Games	Minutes	GA	Team GAA
1	Missouri St.	18	1735	8	.415
2	Georgetown	21	1952	10	.461
3	Army	18	1728	10	.529
4	New Hampshire	18	1695	11	.584
5	Cornell	17	1643	11	.603
6	North Carolina	20	1930	13	.606
7	Milwaukee	20	1865	13	.626
8	St.Francis (PA)	19	1822	13	.6421
9	South Florida	21	2151	16	.669
10	Temple	18	1733	13	.675

Last weekly update on December 16, 2013. Source: NCAA.com – Team GAA

SHUTOUT PERCENTAGE
Rank	School	Games	Shutouts	Shutout %
1	Georgetown	21	14	.667
	Army	18	12	.667
3	Missouri State	18	11	.611
4	Michigan State	23	13	.565
5	Furman	18	10	.556
6	Denver	20	11	.550
7	Charlotte	21	11	.524
	Hartford	21	11	.524
	Quinnipiac	21	11	.524
10	UConn	23	12	.522

Last weekly update on December 16, 2013. Source: NCAA.com – SO Pct

WON-LOST-TIED PERCENTAGE
Rank	School	Wins	Loses	Ties	W-L-T %
1	UMBC	16	1	3	.875
2	Notre Dame	17	1	6	.833
3	Washington	16	2	4	.818
4	Dayton	14	2	3	.816
5	Milwaukee	15	3	2	.800
	UIC	16	4	0	.800
7	Akron	17	4	1	.795
8	Coastal Carolina	19	5	0	.792
9	Navy	16	4	2	.773
10	Army	12	3	3	.750
	Denver	13	3	4	.750
	Maryland	17	4	5	.750

Last weekly update on December 16, 2013. Source: NCAA.com – Team W-L-T pct

== NCAA tournament ==
The College Cup was played at PPL Park in Chester, Pennsylvania on December 13 & 15, 2013. In the semifinals, Notre Dame defeated New Mexico, and Maryland beat Virginia. In the Finals, Notre Dame prevailed 2–1 for its first championship.

National Semifinals; December 13
8	Virginia	1
5	Maryland	2
3	Notre Dame	2
7	New Mexico	0

National Championship; December 15
5	Maryland	1
3	Notre Dame	2

== Award winners ==
=== Hermann Trophy/National Player of the Year ===
The Hermann Trophy for the national men's Player of the Year was awarded by the Missouri Athletic Club and the National Soccer Coaches Association of America to Patrick Mullins of Maryland. Mullins became the fourth man and the seventh player overall to win the trophy in back-to-back years.

=== NSCAA/Continental Tire Men's NCAA Division I All-America Team ===
On December 9, 2013, the National Soccer Coaches Association of America released their All-American teams for the 2011 NCAA Division I men's soccer season. The list included a first, second and third team.

First team

Note: Flags indicate national team as defined under FIFA eligibility rules; some limited exceptions apply. Players may hold more than one non-FIFA nationality.

No.	Pos.	Nation	Player
1	GK	JAM	Andre Blake (Connecticut)
2	DF	USA	Steve Birnbaum (California)
3	DF	USA	A. J. Cochran (Wisconsin)
4	DF	USA	Taylor Peay (Washington)
5	MF	ENG	Laurie Bell (Milwaukee)
6	MF	USA	Aodhan Quinn (Akron)
7	MF	GER	Leo Stolz (UCLA)
8	FW	USA	Pete Caringi III (UMBC)
9	FW	ISR	Sagi Lev-Ari (Cal State Northridge)
10	FW	USA	Patrick Mullins (Maryland)
11	FW	USA	Harrison Shipp (Notre Dame)

Second team

Note: Flags indicate national team as defined under FIFA eligibility rules; some limited exceptions apply. Players may hold more than one non-FIFA nationality.

No.	Pos.	Nation	Player
1	GK	USA	Winston Boldt (Army)
2	DF	MLI	Oumar Ballo (UMBC)
3	DF	USA	Marco Franco (UC Irvine)
4	DF	USA	Bryan Gallego (Akron)
5	MF	USA	Kyle Venter (New Mexico)
6	MF	ESP	Adria Beso (Connecticut)
7	MF	USA	Thomas McNamara (Clemson)
8	MF	BRA	Pedro Ribeiro (Coastal Carolina)
9	FW	USA	Brandon Allen (Georgetown)
10	FW	ESP	Guillermo Delgado (Delaware)
11	FW	ENG	Tim Hopkinson (Old Dominion)
12	FW	USA	Steve Neumann (Georgetown)

Third team

Note: Flags indicate national team as defined under FIFA eligibility rules; some limited exceptions apply. Players may hold more than one non-FIFA nationality.

No.	Pos.	Nation	Player
1	GK	GER	Steffen Kraus (George Mason)
2	DF	NGA	Mayowa Alli (Bucknell)
3	DF	USA	Grant Van De Casteele (Notre Dame)
4	DF	USA	Joseph Greenspan (Navy)
5	DF	USA	Sebastien Ibeagha (Duke)
6	DF	USA	Kevin Cope (Michigan State)
7	MF	USA	Kadeem Dacres (UMBC)
8	MF	USA	Eric Bird (Virginia)
9	MF	USA	Enrique Cardenas (UC Irvine)
10	FW	CRC	Reinaldo Brenes (Akron)
11	FW	USA	Kevin Correa (St. Francis Brooklyn)
12	FW	BIH	Robert Kristo (St. Louis)
13	FW	USA	Mark Sherrod (Memphis)

== See also ==
- College soccer
- List of NCAA Division I men's soccer programs
- 2013 in American soccer
- 2013 NCAA Division I Men's Soccer Championship
