= List of Northeast Conference men's soccer regular season champions =

This is a list of Northeast Conference men's soccer regular season first-place finishers, including ties.

Year	Champion	Head coach	Record
1985	LIU Brooklyn (1)	Arnold Ramirez	6–0–0
1986	LIU Brooklyn (2)	Arnold Ramirez	5–0–1
1987	Loyola (MD) (1)	Bill Sento	5–1–0
1988	Fairleigh Dickinson (1)	Ben Stravato	4–1–0
1989	LIU Brooklyn (3)	Arnold Ramirez	5–1–1
1990	Monmouth (1)	Wayne Ramsey	6–1–0
1991	St. Francis Brooklyn (1)	Sam Carrington	6–1–0
1992	Robert Morris (1)	John Kowalski	6–1–1
1993	Monmouth (2); Fairleigh Dickinson (2)	Wayne Ramsey; Tom Lang	6–2–0
1994	Robert Morris (2)	Peter Smith	7–0–1
1995	Robert Morris (3)	John Kowalski	8–0–0
1996	Robert Morris (4)	John Kowalski	7–1–0
1997	St. Francis Brooklyn (2)	Sam Carrington	5–1–0
1998	St. Francis Brooklyn (3)	Sam Carrington	7–1–1
1999	UMBC (1)	Pete Caringi	9–0–1
2000	Fairleigh Dickinson (3)	Seth Roland	8–2–0
2001	Fairleigh Dickinson (4); Robert Morris (5)	Seth Roland; Bill Denniston	8–2–0
2002	LIU Brooklyn (4); UMBC (2)	TJ Kostecky; Pete Caringi	8–1–1
2003	Fairleigh Dickinson (5)	Seth Roland	7–1–1
2004	Fairleigh Dickinson (6)	Seth Roland	7–2–0
2005	Monmouth (3)	Rob McCourt	6–0–3
2006	Monmouth (4)	Rob McCourt	7–0–2
2007	Monmouth (5)	Rob McCourt	7–2–0
2008	Monmouth (6)	Rob McCourt	6–1–2
2009	Monmouth (7)	Rob McCourt	8–1–1
2010	Monmouth (8)	Rob McCourt	14–2–4
2011	Central Connecticut (1); Sacred Heart (1); Monmouth (9)	Shaun Green; Joe Barroso; Rob McCourt	7–3–0; 6–1–3; 7–3–0
2012	Quinnipiac (1)	Eric Da Costa	8–1–1
2013	Central Connecticut (2)	Shaun Green	9–0–1
2014	Saint Francis (PA) (1)	Michael Casper	6–1–0
2015	LIU Brooklyn (5)	TJ Kostecky	7–0–0
2016	St. Francis Brooklyn (4)	Tom Giovatto	6–0–1
2017	St. Francis Brooklyn (5)	Tom Giovatto	6–0–1
2018	LIU Brooklyn (6)	TJ Kostecky	6–2–0
2019	Merrimack (1)	Tony Martone	9–0–0
2020	St. Francis Brooklyn (6)	Tom Giovatto	5–1–1
2021	St. Francis Brooklyn (7); LIU (7) (Note: First title won after the merger of both athletics teams.)	Tom Giovatto; Michael Mordocco	7–2–0
2022	Fairleigh Dickinson (7)	Seth Roland	6–0–2
2023	Saint Francis (PA) (2)	Mads Kaiser	5–0–3
2024	Mercyhurst (1)	Austin Solomon	5–1–2

== Winners by school ==
Italic	Denotes school is a former member of the NEC

School	Titles	Years won
Monmouth	9	1990, 1993, 2005, 2006, 2007, 2008, 2009, 2010, 2011
Fairleigh Dickinson	7	1988, 1993, 2000, 2001, 2003, 2004, 2022
LIU	7	1985, 1986, 1989, 2002, 2015, 2018, 2021
St. Francis Brooklyn	7	1991, 1997, 1998, 2016, 2017, 2020, 2021
Robert Morris	5	1992, 1994, 1995, 1996, 2001
Saint Francis (PA)	2	2014, 2023
Central Connecticut	2	2011, 2013
UMBC	2	1999, 2002
Loyola (MD)	1	1987
Sacred Heart	1	2011
Quinnipiac	1	2012
Merrimack (Note: Joined the conference in 2019.)	1	2019
Mercyhurst	1	2024
