= Jimmy Ockford =

American soccer player (born 1992)

Personal information
- Full name: James William Ockford
- Date of birth: June 10, 1992 (age 34)
- Place of birth: Yardley, Pennsylvania, United States
- Height: 1.86 m (6 ft 1 in)
- Position: Defender

College career
Years	Team	Apps	(Gls)
2010–2012	Mount St. Mary's Mountaineers	50	(5)
2013	Louisville Cardinals	20	(4)

Senior career*
Years	Team	Apps	(Gls)
2012	Central Jersey Spartans	12	(0)
2013	Reading United	8	(0)
2014–2016	Seattle Sounders FC	1	(0)
2014	→ New York Cosmos (loan)	10	(2)
2015	→ Seattle Sounders FC 2 (loan)	13	(1)
2016	→ New York Cosmos (loan)	18	(0)
2017	Reno 1868	31	(4)
2018–2019	San Jose Earthquakes	15	(0)
2018	→ Reno 1868 (loan)	2	(0)
2019	→ Nashville SC (loan)	14	(2)
2020	Louisville City	9	(0)
2021–2023	Colorado Springs Switchbacks	64	(2)
- * Club domestic league appearances and goals as of October 20, 2023

James William Ockford (born June 10, 1992) is an American former professional soccer player.

== Career ==
=== College and amateur ===
Ockford began his college career at Mount St. Mary's University where he played as a forward for three seasons. In his freshman year with the Mountaineers, Ockford made 17 appearances and finished the year with one assist. In 2011, he made 16 appearances and tallied three goals and three assists. In 2012, he made 17 appearances and tallied two goals. Following the conclusion of the 2012, Mount St. Mary's Athletics announced that it would cut three of their sports programs, including men's soccer.

On February 6, 2013, it was announced that Ockford transferred to the University of Louisville for his senior season. In his lone season with the Cardinals, Ockford was converted to defender and he excelled as he made 20 appearances, tallied four goals and helped the Cardinals record nine clean sheets on their way to winning the AAC regular season title. On November 14, Ockford was named AAC Defender of the Year.

During his time in college, Ockford also played in the USL Premier Development League for Central Jersey Spartans and Reading United.

=== North American Soccer League ===
On January 16, 2014, Ockford was drafted in the second round of the 2014 MLS SuperDraft (21st overall) by Seattle Sounders FC. He signed with the club on February 26 and was immediately loaned to NASL club New York Cosmos. On May 28, Ockford made his professional debut and scored his first goal in a 2–0 win over NPSL club Brooklyn Italians in the third round of the Lamar Hunt U.S. Open Cup. Three days later, he made his NASL debut and scored in a 3–0 win against Fort Lauderdale Strikers.

Ockford scored two goals and made 10 appearances for the Cosmos during the 2014 regular season, helping the team clinch a berth in The Championship. He also scored one goal in three U.S. Open Cup appearances for the Cosmos.

=== United Soccer League ===
On January 10, 2017, it was announced that USL side and San Jose Earthquakes affiliate Reno 1868 FC had signed Ockford. He scored his first goal for the team on May 20, 2017, in Reno's 6–0 rout of his former team Seattle Sounders FC 2. Ockford made his first appearance for San Jose as a 33rd-minute substitute for Andrés Imperiale on July 14, 2017, during San Jose's 4–1 friendly victory over Eintracht Frankfurt.

Ockford joined USL Championship team Louisville City FC on a full-time basis on December 5, 2019.

On December 24, 2020, it was announced that Ockford would join USL Championship side Colorado Springs Switchbacks ahead of their 2021 season. Following the 2023 season, Ockford announced his retirement from playing professionally.

=== Major League Soccer ===
Ockford was signed by the San Jose Earthquakes on December 14, 2017, along with Reno teammates Chris Wehan and Luis Felipe Fernandes. He made his MLS debut on March 3, 2018, during San Jose's season-opening 3–2 victory over Minnesota United FC, substituting on in the 54th minute after Yeferson Quintana was injured.

== Statistics ==
Statistics accurate as of June 13, 2018.

Club	Season	League		Open Cup		MLS Cup		Total	
Club	Season	Apps	Goals	Apps	Goals	Apps	Goals	Apps	Goals
New York Cosmos	2014	10	2	3	1	–	–	13	3
New York Cosmos	2015	0	0	0	0	–	–	0	0
Total		10	2	3	1	–	–	13	3
Seattle Sounders FC 2	2015	14	1	0	0	–	–	14	1
Total		14	1	0	0	–	–	14	1
Seattle Sounders FC	2015	1	0	0	0	0	0	1	0
Seattle Sounders FC	2016	0	0	0	0	0	0	0	0
Total		1	0	0	0	0	0	1	0
New York Cosmos	2016	19	0	2	0	–	–	21	0
Total		19	0	2	0	–	–	21	0
Reno 1868 FC	2017	32	4	1	0	–	–	33	4
Total		32	4	1	0	–	–	33	4
San Jose Earthquakes	2018	7	0	1	0	0	0	8	0
Total		7	0	1	0	0	0	8	0
Career Total		83	7	7	1	0	0	90	8

== Honors ==
=== University of Louisville ===
- American Athletic Conference regular season champions: 2013

=== Individual ===
- American Athletic Conference Defender of the Year: 2013
