= Tim Polasek =

American football player and coach (born 1979)

- Polasek in 2025

Current position
- Title: Head coach
- Team: North Dakota State
- Conference: Mountain West
- Record: 35–5
- Annual salary: 1.17 Million

Biographical details
- Born: August 8, 1979 (age 47); Iola, Wisconsin, U.S.

Playing career
- 1998–2001: Concordia (WI)
- Position: Quarterback

Coaching career (HC unless noted)
- 2003: Wisconsin–Stevens Point (QB)
- 2003: Wisconsin–Stevens Point (PGC/WR/TE)
- 2003–2004: Wisconsin–Stevens Point (ST/PGC/WR/TE)
- 2005: Wisconsin–Stevens Point (ST/DB)
- 2006: North Dakota State (GA)
- 2007–2011: North Dakota State (RB)
- 2012: North Dakota State (ST/TE/FB)
- 2013: Northern Illinois (TE/FB)
- 2014–2016: North Dakota State (OC/RB)
- 2017–2020: Iowa (OL)
- 2021–2023: Wyoming (OC/QB)
- 2024–present: North Dakota State

Head coaching record
- Overall: 35–5
- Tournaments: 4–1 (NCAA D-I playoffs)

Accomplishments and honors

Championships
- NCAA Division I FCS (2024); 2x MVFC (2024, 2025)

Awards
- MVFC Coach of the Year (2025)

Tim Polasek is an American college football coach and former player. He is currently the head football coach at North Dakota State. Prior to becoming the 32nd head coach in program history, he served as the offensive coordinator and quarterbacks coach from 2021 to 2023 at Wyoming under former Bison head coach, Craig Bohl. He also served as the offensive coordinator at North Dakota State for three seasons from 2014 to 2016, helping the Bison to two consecutive NCAA Division I Football Championships in addition to winning two more national championships as a position coach, in 2011 and 2012.

Polasek spent the 2013 season coaching tight ends and fullbacks at Northern Illinois before returning to North Dakota State for the 2014 season.

== Coaching career ==
=== Wisconsin–Stevens Point ===
Polasek began his coaching at the University of Wisconsin–Stevens Point in the spring of 2003 as the football team's quarterbacks coach. That fall, he was given the role of pass game coordinator, wide receivers coach, and tight ends coach. In 2004, he added the role of special teams coordinator. In 2005, he was the team's defensive backs coach and the special teams coordinator.

=== North Dakota State (first stint) ===
In 2006 Polasek joined NDSU as a graduate assistant. In 2007 he was named running backs coach which he held until the end of the team's 2011 season. For NDSU's 2012 championship season, Tim served as the special teams coordinator, tight ends coach, and fullbacks coach.

=== Northern Illinois ===
In 2013 Polasek joined the Huskies as the team's tight ends coach and fullbacks coach. He helped the team to the 2013 Mid-American Conference championship game and Poinsettia Bowl.

=== North Dakota State (offensive coordinator) ===
In 2014 Polasek returned to Fargo, as the team's offensive coordinator and running backs coach. He stayed in that role until the end of the 2016 season after winning two additional championships with the Bison.

=== Iowa ===
In February 2017 he became the offensive line coach at the University of Iowa under Kirk Ferentz. He stayed there until after the 2020 season.

=== Wyoming ===
On February 10, 2021 the Wyoming Cowboys announced Polasek would reunite with Craig Bohl as the team's new offensive coordinator and quarterbacks coach.

=== North Dakota State (head coach) ===
On Dec. 17, 2023, Polasek was announced as the new head coach, replacing Matt Entz. He left to be the assistant head coach of the defense and linebackers coach for USC. In his first year, Polasek lead the Bison to a 14-2 record, winning both the Missouri Valley Football conference title and the National Championship, beating Montana State 35-32, the Bisons 11th title game appearance and 10th win in 14 years. The following year (2025), Polasek led the Bison to another conference title and the first undefeated conference record (8-0) since 2019. His efforts earned Polasek the MVFC Coach of the Year (Bruce Craddock Award).

== Head coaching record ==
Year	Team	Overall	Conference	Standing	Bowl/playoffs	STATS^{#}	Coaches^{°}
North Dakota State Bison (Missouri Valley Football Conference) (2024–2025)
2024	North Dakota State	14–2	7–1	T–1st	W NCAA Division I Championship	1	1
2025	North Dakota State	12–1	8–0	1st	L NCAA Division I Second Round	4	5
North Dakota State Bison (Mountain West Conference) (2026–present)
2026	North Dakota State	9–2	6–2				
North Dakota State:		35–5	21–3				
Total:		35–5					
National championship Conference title Conference division title or championship game berth
^{#}Rankings from final TSN/STATS Ppll.; ^{°}Rankings from final FCS Coaches poll.
