= 2013 Atlantic Sun men's soccer tournament =

2013 Atlantic Sun Conference men's soccer standings
	Conf.					Overall
Team	W		L		T	W		L		T
Florida Gulf Coast	6	–	1	–	1	8	–	7	–	2
East Tennessee State ‡	5	–	2	–	1	10	–	6	–	4
Northern Kentucky #	5	–	2	–	1	9	–	4	–	6
Lipscomb	4	–	3	–	1	9	–	9	–	2
Mercer	3	–	4	–	1	5	–	14	–	1
North Florida	2	–	4	–	2	8	–	7	–	3
Jacksonville	2	–	4	–	2	4	–	11	–	3
Stetson	2	–	4	–	2	3	–	10	–	4
USC Upstate	1	–	6	–	1	1	–	11	–	2
‡ - Tournament champion + - Invited to the NCAA Division I Men's Soccer Championship # - Ineligible (In transition); As of November 21, 2013; Rankings from NSCAA

The 2013 Atlantic Sun Conference men's soccer tournament was the 35th edition of the tournament. Held at the FGCU Soccer Complex, the tournament decided the Atlantic Sun Conference champion and guaranteed representative into the 2013 NCAA Division I Men's Soccer Championship.

The East Tennessee State Buccaneers won the title against the North Florida Ospreys.

== Qualification ==
2013 Atlantic Sun men's soccer tournament
Tournament details
- Country: United States
- Teams: 6

Final positions
- Champions: East Tennessee State
- Runners-up: North Florida

Tournament statistics
- Matches played: 5

== See also ==
- Atlantic Sun Conference
- 2013 Atlantic Sun Conference men's soccer season
- 2013 NCAA Division I men's soccer season
- 2013 NCAA Division I Men's Soccer Championship
