= Nikola Paunic =

Canadian soccer player (born 1993)

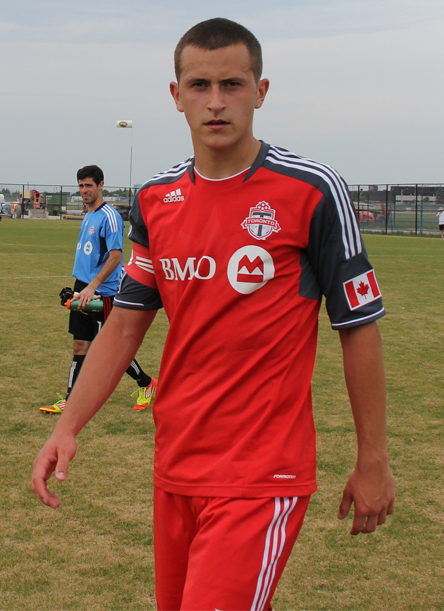
- Paunic captaining TFC Academy in 2012

Personal information
- Full name: Nikola Paunić
- Date of birth: October 13, 1993 (age 33)
- Place of birth: Podgorica, FR Yugoslavia
- Height: 1.90 m (6 ft 3 in)
- Position: Defender

Youth career
- 2003–2009: Serbian White Eagles
- 2012: Toronto FC

College career
Years	Team	Apps	(Gls)
2011–2012	Toronto Varsity Blues	22	(1)
2013–2014	South Florida Bulls	40	(1)

Senior career*
Years	Team	Apps	(Gls)
2009–2011	Serbian White Eagles	4	(0)
2014	K-W United	8	(0)
2015	Orange County Blues	4	(0)

International career
2012	Canada U20	4	(0)
- * Club domestic league appearances and goals

Nikola Paunic (born October 13, 1993) is a Canadian former soccer player.

== University career ==
Paunic played two years of college soccer at the University of Toronto.

In 2013, he transferred to the University of South Florida. In his debut season with the Bulls, he was named twice as the American Conference's defensive player of the week. He also helped South Florida win the American Conference title by defeating the University of Connecticut in a penalty shootout.

In his second season, he was named the conference's defensive player of the week in October. Once the season concluded, he was named to the conference all-tournament team.

== Club career ==
=== Early career ===
Paunic played his youth career with the Serbian White Eagles and would play with both the team's senior and reserve teams in the Canadian Soccer League. In 2011, while playing with Serbia's reserve team in the league's second division, he was nominated for the defender of the year award. In 2012, he joined TFC Academy's senior team in the league's first division, where he was named team captain. Paunic helped the academy side secure a playoff berth. Once the season concluded, he was nominated for both the defender and rookie of the year award.

Paunic was selected to represent Toronto FC in the 2013 Dallas Cup. He played in the tournament, where he appeared in a match against Tigres UANL. He also played with Toronto FC's reserve team in the MLS Reserve League.

Paunic also appeared for USL PDL side K-W United FC in 2014. In his debut season in the PDL circuit, he helped the team secure a postseason berth by finishing second in their division. Their playoff journey ended in the first round after a defeat by Des Moines Menace in a penalty shootout.

=== Orange County ===
On January 20, 2015, Paunic was selected 74th overall in the 2015 MLS SuperDraft by Vancouver Whitecaps FC. After he wasn't signed by Vancouver, he joined United Soccer League side Orange County Blues on June 2, 2015. The club would secure a playoff berth by clinching its conference title.

== International career ==
In 2012, Paunic was called to a camp for the Canada men's national under-20 soccer team in Florida. Several months later, he was selected to represent the Canada U20 team in the Marbella Cup.

== Managerial career ==
Paunic became a coach for the Stella Rossa Football Club Academy in the Ontario Academy Soccer League.

== Personal life ==
Following his retirement from competitive soccer, he transitioned into the culinary realm by operating a family-run restaurant that serves Serbian cuisine.

== Honors ==
Orange County Blues

- United Soccer League Western Conference: 2015

South Florida Bulls

- National Collegiate Athletic Association American Athletic Conference: 2013
