= 2013 Atlantic 10 Conference men's soccer season =

- League: NCAA Division I
- Sport: Soccer
- Duration: August, 2013 – November, 2013

Tournament
- Champions: George Mason
- Runners-up: Saint Louis

A-10 men's soccer seasons
- ← 2012 2014 →

2013 Atlantic 10 Conference men's soccer standings
	Conf.					Overall
Team	W		L		T	W		L		T
Saint Louis	6	–	0	–	2	14	–	5	–	2
George Mason ‡	5	–	0	–	3	12	–	3	–	6
VCU +	5	–	2	–	1	11	–	8	–	2
La Salle	5	–	2	–	1	8	–	8	–	4
Dayton	4	–	2	–	2	14	–	2	–	3
Duquesne	4	–	3	–	1	9	–	8	–	1
Massachusetts	3	–	5	–	0	4	–	14	–	1
Saint Joseph's	3	–	5	–	0	5	–	8	–	6
George Washington	2	–	4	–	2	5	–	10	–	2
St. Bonaventure	2	–	5	–	1	8	–	9	–	2
Fordham	2	–	5	–	1	5	–	11	–	1
Rhode Island	0	–	8	–	0	2	–	14	–	0
‡ - Tournament champion + - Invited to the NCAA Division I Men's Soccer Championship; As of November 25, 2013; Rankings from NSCAA

The 2013 Atlantic 10 Conference men's soccer season will be the 18th season of men's varsity soccer in the conference. The season will mark the first for the incoming George Mason Patriots. The venue for the 2013 Atlantic 10 Men's Soccer Tournament was Baujan Field at the University of Dayton.

The defending regular-season champions are the Charlotte 49ers, who left the Atlantic 10 to join Conference USA as part of the 2010–13 NCAA conference realignment. The Saint Louis Billikens are the defending tournament champions.

== Changes from 2012 ==
- Richmond dropped men's soccer after the 2012 season.
- George Mason joined the Atlantic 10 after playing in the Colonial Athletic Association
- Butler, Charlotte, Temple, and Xavier all left the conference. Butler and Xavier joined the Big East Conference, Charlotte joined C-USA, and Temple joined the American Athletic Conference.
- Chase Brooks, former head coach of the Niagara Purple Eagles program, was hired by Duquesne.

== Teams ==
=== Stadia and locations ===
Team	Location	Stadium	Capacity
Dayton Flyers	Dayton, Ohio	Baujan Field	2,000
Duquesne Dukes	Pittsburgh, Pennsylvania	Rooney Field	2,200
Fordham Rams	Bronx, New York	Coffey Field	8,000
George Mason Patriots	Fairfax, Virginia	George Mason Stadium	5,000
George Washington Colonials	Washington, D.C.	Mount Vernon Athletic Complex	1,000
La Salle Explorers	Philadelphia, Pennsylvania	McCarthy Stadium	7,500
UMass Minutemen	Amherst, Massachusetts	Rudd Field	800
Rhode Island Rams	Kingston, Rhode Island	URI Soccer Complex	1,547
St. Bonaventure Bonnies	St. Bonaventure, New York	McGraw-Jennings Field	2,000
Saint Joseph's Hawks	Philadelphia, Pennsylvania	Finnesey Field	600
Saint Louis Billikens	St. Louis, Missouri	Hermann Stadium	6,050
VCU Rams	Richmond, Virginia	Sports Backers Stadium	3,250

=== Personnel ===
Team	Head coach	Captain	Shirt supplier
Dayton Flyers	(United States) Dennis Currier	TBA	(United States) Nike
Duquesne Dukes	(United States) Chase Brooks	TBA	(United States) Nike
Fordham Rams	(United States) Jim McElderry	TBA	(United States) Nike
George Mason Patriots	(United States) Greg Andrulis	TBA	(Germany) Adidas
George Washington Colonials	(Wales) Craig Jones	TBA	(United States) Nike
La Salle Explorers	(United States) Pat Farrell	TBA	(United States) Nike
UMass Minutemen	(United States) Sam Koch	TBA	(Germany) Adidas
Rhode Island Rams	(Northern Ireland) Gareth Elliott	TBA	(Germany) Adidas
St. Bonaventure Bonnies	(United States) Mel Mahler	TBA	(Italy) Diadora
Saint Joseph's Hawks	(United States) Don D'Ambra	TBA	(United States) Nike
Saint Louis Billikens	(United States) Mike McGinty	(United States) Robbie Kristo	(United States) Nike
VCU Rams	(United States) David Giffard	(Costa Rica) Juan Monge Solano	(United States) Nike

== A10 Tournament ==
The format for the 2013 Atlantic 10 Men's Soccer Tournament will be announced in the Fall of 2013.

== Results ==
Home/Away	DAY	DUQ	FOR	GMU	GWU	LAS	MAS	URI	STB	STJ	STL	VCU
Dayton Flyers												
Duquesnse Dukes												
Fordham Rams												
George Mason Patriots												
George Washington Colonials												
La Salle Explorers												
Massachusetts Minutemen												
Rhode Island Rams												
St. Bonaventure Bonnies												
Saint Joseph's Hawks												
Saint Louis Billikens												
VCU Rams	background: #80808											

== See also ==
- Atlantic 10 Conference
- 2013 Atlantic 10 Men's Soccer Tournament
- 2013 NCAA Division I men's soccer season
- 2013 in American soccer
