= 2013 Atlantic 10 men's soccer tournament =

Tournament details
- Country: United States
- Teams: 8

Final positions
- Champions: George Mason
- Runner-up: Saint Louis

Tournament statistics
- Matches played: 7
- Goals scored: 16 (2.29 per match)
- Top goal scorer(s): Tie

Awards
- Best player: 1

The 2013 Atlantic 10 Men's Soccer Tournament was the eighteenth edition of the tournament. Held from Nov. 14-17, it determined the Atlantic 10 Conference's automatic berth into the 2013 NCAA Division I Men's Soccer Championship. The George Mason Patriots defeated the defending champions, the Saint Louis Billikens in the final, thus advancing to the NCAA Tournament for the first time since 2008.

The tournament was hosted by the University of Dayton and all matches were contested at Baujan Field.

== Qualification ==
2013 Atlantic 10 Conference men's soccer standings
	Conf.					Overall
Team	W		L		T	W		L		T
Saint Louis	6	–	0	–	2	14	–	5	–	2
George Mason ‡	5	–	0	–	3	12	–	3	–	6
VCU +	5	–	2	–	1	11	–	8	–	2
La Salle	5	–	2	–	1	8	–	8	–	4
Dayton	4	–	2	–	2	14	–	2	–	3
Duquesne	4	–	3	–	1	9	–	8	–	1
Massachusetts	3	–	5	–	0	4	–	14	–	1
Saint Joseph's	3	–	5	–	0	5	–	8	–	6
George Washington	2	–	4	–	2	5	–	10	–	2
St. Bonaventure	2	–	5	–	1	8	–	9	–	2
Fordham	2	–	5	–	1	5	–	11	–	1
Rhode Island	0	–	8	–	0	2	–	14	–	0
‡ - Tournament champion + - Invited to the NCAA Division I Men's Soccer Championship; As of November 25, 2013; Rankings from NSCAA

The top eight teams in the Atlantic 10 Conference based on their conference regular season records qualified for the tournament. The top seeded teams included George Mason, Saint Louis, VCU and La Salle.

== Bracket ==
Quarterfinals
1	Saint Louis	2
8	Massachusetts	0
4	La Salle	1(3)
5	Dayton	1(2)
2	George Mason	0(4)
7	Saint Joseph's	0(2)
3	VCU	2
6	Duquesne	1

Semifinals
1	Saint Louis	2
4	La Salle	1
2	George Mason	3
3	VCU	2

Championship
1	Saint Louis	0
2	George Mason	1

== Schedule ==
=== Quarterfinals ===
November 14, 2013	#2 George Mason	0–0 (a.e.t.) (4–2 p)	#7 Saint Joseph's	Dayton, Ohio
11:00 ET	Mulinge (yellow card) 41'; Arjona (yellow card) 74'	Report	Roberts (yellow card) 45'	Stadium: Baujan Field; Attendance: 153; Referee: Riz Milliken
	Penalties
	Arjona (penalty scored); Herstek (penalty scored); Sever (penalty scored); Mulgrew (penalty scored)		(penalty scored) Nelson; (penalty scored) Lazorko; (penalty missed) B. Reilly; (penalty missed) J. Reilly

November 14, 2013	#3 VCU	2–1	#6 Duquesne	Dayton, Ohio
14:00 ET	Harvey 16'; Fisher 86'	Report	De Villardi 4'; Dissoma (yellow card) 89'	Stadium: Baujan Field; Attendance: 149; Referee: Mark Garcia

November 14, 2013	#1 Saint Louis	2–0	#8 Massachusetts	Dayton, Ohio
17:00 ET	GIESEKE 48' (yellow card) 68'; Kristo 50'	Report	Marchand (yellow card) 72'; Keys (yellow card) 83'	Stadium: Baujan Field; Attendance: 487; Referee: Shaun Papperman;

November 14, 2013	#4 La Salle	1–1 (a.e.t.) (3–2 p)	#5 Dayton	Dayton, Ohio
20:00 ET	Plumhoff 14'; Baker (yellow card) 71'	Report	Enstone 33'	Stadium: Baujan Field; Attendance: 1,077; Referee: Cory Richardson
	Penalties
	Plumhoff (penalty scored); Friskey (penalty missed); Farrell (penalty scored); Robinson (penalty scored)		(penalty missed) Jones; (penalty missed) Gamboa; (penalty scored) Keller; (penalty scored) Amankona; (penalty missed) Allheily

=== Semifinals ===
November 15, 2013	#2 George Mason	3–2 (a.e.t.)	#3 VCU	Dayton, Ohio
17:00 ET	Herstek 27'; Arjona (yellow card) 63'; Harmouche 64'; Miller (yellow card) 83'; Mulgrew 91'	Report	Castillo 19'; Herrera Meraz (yellow card) 20'; Bowie (yellow card) 62'; Belmar 80'	Stadium: Baujan Field; Attendance: 168; Referee: Shaun Papperman

November 15, 2013	#1 Saint Louis	2–1	#4 La Salle	Dayton, Ohio
19:30 ET	Graydon 19'; Bryce 53'	Report	Sullivan 55' (yellow card) 82'; Santon (yellow card) 65'	Stadium: Baujan Field; Attendance: 187; Referee: Mikael Lundqvist

=== A-10 Championship ===
November 17, 2013	#1 Saint Louis	0–1	#2 George Mason	Kettering, Ohio
11:30 ET	Lee (yellow card) 85'	Report	Herrera 82' (pen.)	Stadium: Alter Stadium; Attendance: 111; Referee: Mark Gorak
Note: Location of match changed due to tornado outbreak of November 17, 2013

== See also ==
- Atlantic 10 Conference
- 2013 Atlantic 10 Conference men's soccer season
- 2013 NCAA Division I men's soccer season
- 2013 NCAA Division I Men's Soccer Championship
