= 2013 Conference USA men's soccer season =

Conference USA
- Season: 2013
- Champions: TBD
- Premiers: TBD
- NCAA Tournament: TBD

The 2013 Conference USA men's soccer season was the 19th season of men's varsity soccer in the conference. The season marked the arrival of the Charlotte 49ers from the Atlantic 10 Conference, the Florida Atlantic Owls from the Mid-American Conference, the New Mexico Lobos from the Mountain Pacific Sports Federation, and the Old Dominion Monarchs from the Colonial Athletic Association. It was also the last C-USA season for the Tulsa Golden Hurricane, which joined join the American Athletic Conference in July 2014. The 2013 Conference USA Men's Soccer Tournament was held November 13–17 at Transamerica Field in Charlotte.

The defending regular season champions were the SMU Mustangs, who left the conference to join The American. The defending tournament champions were the Tulsa Golden Hurricane.

== Changes from 2012 ==
- Charlotte, Florida Atlantic, and Old Dominion joined C-USA as all-sports members, while New Mexico joined for men's soccer only.
- Memphis, SMU and UCF left C-USA to join The American.

== Teams ==
=== Stadia and locations ===
Team	Location	Stadium	Capacity
Charlotte 49ers	Charlotte, North Carolina	Transamerica Field	7,500
FIU Panthers	Miami, Florida	FIU Soccer Stadium	2,700
Florida Atlantic Owls	Boca Raton, Florida	FAU Soccer Stadium	300
Kentucky Wildcats	Lexington, Kentucky	UK Soccer Complex	3,000
Marshall Thundering Herd	Huntington, West Virginia	Veterans Memorial Soccer Complex	1,006
New Mexico Lobos	Albuquerque, New Mexico	Lobo Soccer/Track Complex	5,000
Old Dominion Monarchs	Norfolk, Virginia	Old Dominion Soccer Complex	2,500
South Carolina Gamecocks	Columbia, South Carolina	Stone Stadium	5,700
Tulsa Golden Hurricane	Tulsa, Oklahoma	HST Stadium	5,000
UAB Blazers	Birmingham, Alabama	West Campus Field	2,500

== Standings ==
2013 Conference USA men's soccer standings
	Conf.					Overall
Team	W		L		T	W		L		T
No. 4 New Mexico +	7	–	1	–	1	14	–	6	–	2
Old Dominion +	7	–	2	–	0	11	–	6	–	1
UAB	5	–	3	–	1	12	–	5	–	1
South Carolina	4	–	2	–	3	7	–	7	–	5
No. 23 Charlotte ‡	4	–	3	–	2	12	–	6	–	3
Tulsa	4	–	3	–	2	11	–	6	–	3
Kentucky	3	–	4	–	2	7	–	10	–	3
FIU	2	–	6	–	1	6	–	10	–	1
Florida Atlantic	1	–	7	–	1	7	–	7	–	2
Marshall	0	–	6	–	3	2	–	11	–	6
‡ - Tournament champion + - Invited to the NCAA Division I Men's Soccer Championship; As of December 17, 2013 (UTC); Rankings from NSCAA

== C-USA Tournament ==
The format for the 2013 Conference USA Men's Soccer Tournament was announced in the Fall of 2013.

== Results ==
Home/Away	CHA	FIU	FAU	KEN	MAR	UNM	ODU	USC	TUL	UAB
Charlotte 49ers										
FIU Panthers										
Florida Atlantic Owls										
Kentucky Wildcats										
Marshall Thundering Herd										
New Mexico Lobos										
Old Dominion Monarchs										
South Carolina Gamecocks										
Tulsa Golden Hurricane										
UAB Blazers										
