= 2013 St. Francis Brooklyn Terriers men's soccer team =

American college soccer season

2013 St. Francis Brooklyn Terriers men's soccer

NEC Tournament Champions

NCAA Soccer Championship, First Round
- Conference: Northeast Conference
- Record: 12–6–1 (4–3–0 NEC)
- Head coach: Tom Giovatto (7th season)
- Assistant coaches: Sinan Selmani (7th season); Christian Cuba (3rd season)
- Home stadium: Brooklyn Bridge Park, Pier 5

2013 Northeast Conference men's soccer standings
	Conf.					Overall
Team	W		L		T	W		L		T
Central Connecticut	6	–	1	–	0	9	–	9	–	1
Saint Francis (PA)	4	–	2	–	1	11	–	4	–	4
Bryant	4	–	2	–	1	7	–	9	–	2
St. Francis Brooklyn ‡	4	–	3	–	0	12	–	6	–	1
Fairleigh Dickinson	2	–	4	–	1	9	–	8	–	1
LIU Brooklyn	2	–	4	–	1	5	–	10	–	2
Robert Morris	2	–	5	–	0	8	–	8	–	2
Sacred Heart	2	–	5	–	0	5	–	13	–	0
‡ - Tournament champion + - Invited to the NCAA Division I Men's Soccer Championship; As of November 21, 2013; Rankings from NSCAA

The 2013 St. Francis Brooklyn Terriers men's soccer team represented St. Francis College during the 2013 NCAA Division I men's soccer season. The Terrier's home games were played at Brooklyn Bridge Park, the inaugural season of the field. Last year, the team played at the Aviator Sports Complex. The team has been a member of the Northeast Conference since 1981 and is coached by Tom Giovatto, who is in his seventh year at the helm of the Terriers.

In 2013, St. Francis went on to win at least 10 games for the 4th time in 7 years under head coach Tom Giovatto and qualified for the Northeast Conference Tournament with the 4th seed for the 11th time in their history. The Terriers defeated 1st seed Central Connecticut State 2–0 in the semifinals and defeated 3rd seed Bryant 3–2 in overtime for the Championship. Kevin Correa was named Tournament Most Valuable Player, scoring 4 goals in the Tournament (2 against the Blue Devils and 2 against the Bulldogs). With the NEC Tournament Championship, the Terriers received an automatic bid to the NCAA tournament and they faced Penn State in the first round on November 21, 2013, losing 0–1.

During the 2013 campaign, the St. Francis Brooklyn men's soccer team catapulted to 2nd in the NSCAA/Continental Tire NCAA Division I North Atlantic Regional Poll ranking for October 23 to October 29 after winning 7 consecutive matches. For the Terriers, it is the highest they have been ranked since 2011, when they were fourth from October 4 to October 11. For the final NSCAA/Continental Tire NCAA Division I North Atlantic Regional Poll of the season the Terriers were ranked 1st; this is the first time in their history being ranked 1st. The Terriers were also ranked 49th Nationally in the NCAA Men's Soccer RPI at the end of the season.

After the season several Terriers received accolades; Junior forward Kevin Correa along with defender and co-captain Andy Cormack garnered All-NSCAA First Team accolades while senior forward Gabriel Bagot was named to the Second Team of the North Atlantic Region. Head coach Tom Giovatto was named North Atlantic Region Coach of the Year. Kevin Correa was then named to the 2013 NSCAA/Continental Tire NCAA Division I Men's All-America Third Team.

After their NEC Championship season the Terriers lost 5 starters to graduation and their best offensive player Kevin Correa who transferred to the New Mexico Lobos.

== 2013 squad ==
As of September 2, 2013. Note: Flags indicate national team as defined under FIFA eligibility rules; some limited exceptions apply. Players may hold more than one non-FIFA nationality.

No.	Pos.	Nation	Player
0	GK	USA	Seth Erdman
1	GK	GBR	Jack Binks
2	DF	ALB	Klement Gjushi
3	DF	VEN	Riccardo Milano
4	DF	AUS	Paul Galimi
5	DF	GBR	Andy Cormack
6	DF	GER	Fabian Suele
7	MF	SWE	Kristoffer Lindfors
8	MF	USA	James Caicedo
9	MF	SWE	Viktor Bakkioui
10	MF	GBR	Harry Odell

No.	Pos.	Nation	Player
11	FW	USA	Gabriel Bagot
12	MF	USA	Richie Arkoi
14	MF	USA	Anthony Campagnano
15	DF	USA	Larry Lopez
17	MF	SWE	John Johansson
19	MF	FRA	Cyril Coisne
20	FW	USA	Michael Collis
24	MF	GBR	Nyle Patel
25	MF	USA	Salvatore Barone
26	MF	JAM	Akeem Brooks
70	FW	USA	Kevin Correa

Captains in bold

== Schedule ==
Date Time, TV	Rank^{#}	Opponent^{#}	Result	Record	Site City, State
Non-conference regular season
August 30, 2013*; 7:00 pm		at Connecticut	L 0–1	0–1–0	Morrone Stadium (3,225); Storrs, CT
September 5, 2013*; 7:00 pm		at Navy; Hampton Inn BWI Classic	W 2–1	1–1–0	Glenn Warner Soccer Facility (273); Annapolis, MD
September 7, 2013*; 7:00 pm		at No. 5 UMBC; Hampton Inn BWI Classic	L 1–3	1–2–0	Retriever Soccer Park (1,086); Baltimore, MD
September 10, 2013*; 7:00 pm		Saint Peter's	W 3–1	2–2–0	Brooklyn Bridge Park, Pier 5 (252); Brooklyn, NY
September 14, 2013*; 2:00 pm		at Howard	W 4–1	3–2–0	William H. Greene Stadium (100); Washington, D.C.
September 22, 2013*; 11:00 am		at Manhattan	W 3–1	4–2–0	Gaelic Park (128); Riverdale, NY
September 26, 2013*; 7:00 pm		Saint Joseph's	T 0–0 ^{2OT}	4–2–1	Brooklyn Bridge Park, Pier 5 (257); Brooklyn, NY
September 29, 2013*; 3:00 pm		at Harvard	W 1–0	5–2–1	Soldiers Field Soccer Stadium (184); Cambridge, MA
October 5, 2013*; 4:00 pm		at NJIT	W 2–0	6–2–1	J. Malcolm Simon Stadium (200); Newark, NJ
Northeast Conference Regular Season
October 11, 2013; 7:00 pm		Sacred Heart	W 1–0	7–2–1 (1–0–0)	Brooklyn Bridge Park, Pier 5 (217); Brooklyn, NY
October 18, 2013; 7:00 pm		at Saint Francis (PA)	L 0–1 ^{2OT}	7–3–1 (1–1–0)	Brooklyn Bridge Park, Pier 5 (205); Brooklyn, NY
October 20, 2013; 1:00 pm		at Robert Morris	W 3–2 ^{OT}	8–3–1 (2–1–0)	Brooklyn Bridge Park, Pier 5 (167); Brooklyn, NY
October 25, 2013; 7:00 pm		at Central Connecticut	L 0–1 ^{OT}	8–4–1 (2–2–0)	CCSU Soccer Field (421); New Britain, CT
October 27, 2013; 1:00 pm		Bryant	W 1–0	9–4–1 (3–2–0)	Brooklyn Bridge Park, Pier 5 (183); Brooklyn, NY
November 1, 2013; 7:00 pm		at Fairleigh Dickinson	L 1–2	9–5–1 (3–3–0)	FDU Soccer Field (123); Teaneck, NJ
November 10, 2013; 1:00 pm		at LIU Brooklyn; Battle of Brooklyn	W 4–0	10–5–1 (4–3–0)	LIU Field (0); Brooklyn, NY
Northeast Conference Tournament
November 15, 2013; 6:30 pm		at Central Connecticut; Semifinals	W 2–0	11–5–1	CCSU Soccer Field (1011); New Britain, CT
November 17, 2013; 1:00 pm		vs. Bryant; Championship	W 3–2 ^{OT}	12–5–1	CCSU Soccer Field (625); New Britain, CT
NCAA Tournament
November 21, 2013*; 7:00 pm		at Penn State; First Round	L 0–1	12–6–1	Jeffrey Field (507); University Park, PA
*Non-conference game. ^{#}Rankings from United Soccer Coaches. (#) Tournament seedings in parentheses.

=== 2013 NSCAA/Continental Tire College rankings ===
Ranking movements Legend: ██ Increase in ranking ██ Decrease in ranking
	Week											
Poll	1	2	3	4	5	6	7	8	9	10	11	Final
North Atlantic Region		7	5	5	2	2	2	2	3	5	2	1

== See also ==
- 2013 Northeast Conference men's soccer season
- 2013 NCAA Division I men's soccer season
- Northeast Conference Men's Soccer Tournament
- 2013 NCAA Division I Men's Soccer Championship
