= Eric Klenofsky =

American soccer player (born 1994)

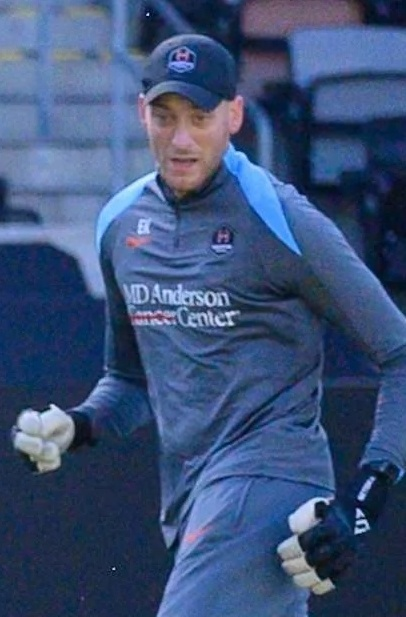
- Klenofsky with the Houston Dash in 2025

Personal information
- Full name: Eric Klenofsky
- Date of birth: September 21, 1994 (age 32)
- Place of birth: Lincoln Park, New Jersey, United States
- Height: 6 ft 6 in (1.98 m)
- Position: Goalkeeper

Youth career
- 2011–2013: TSF Academy

College career
Years	Team	Apps	(Gls)
2013–2016	Monmouth Hawks	66	(0)

Senior career*
Years	Team	Apps	(Gls)
2012–2013	Jersey Blues FC	5	(0)
2014–2015	Ocean City Nor'easters	8	(0)
2016	New York Red Bulls U-23	15	(0)
2017	D.C. United	0	(0)
2017	→ Richmond Kickers (loan)	1	(0)
2018	Richmond Kickers	0	(0)
2018–2019	Hapoel Marmorek	15	(0)
2019–2020	Toronto FC II	9	(0)
2020	→ Tacoma Defiance (loan)	8	(0)

Managerial career
- 2018: Fairleigh Dickinson Knights (assistant)
- 2021: South Florida Bulls (assistant)
- 2022–: Houston Dynamo (Head of Academy Goalkeeping)
- * Club domestic league appearances and goals as of October 4, 2020

Eric Klenofsky (born September 21, 1994) is an American former soccer player who played as a goalkeeper.

== Career ==
=== Youth and college ===
Klenofsky played high school soccer for DePaul Catholic High School and the TSF Academy Club team. While at DePaul Catholic, Klenofsky, helped the DePaul Spartans win their first Passaic County Championship in 2012. He was also part of the TSF U-18 club team that won the Super Y-League championship in 2011. Ahead of the 2013 NCAA Division I men's soccer season, Klenofsky committed to Monmouth University to play for the Monmouth Hawks men's soccer program.

During his freshman year, Klenofsky replaced Stephen Graziani as the starting goalie halfway through the season. As a starter, Monmouth's record vastly improved as the Hawks closed out the season with a 7–1–4 record with him in the net. Klenofsky finished with a 0.22 goals-against average and a .914 save percentage. These were both the best records of goalkeepers across the nation, and set a Metro Atlantic Athletic Conference men's soccer season record. During his freshman season, Klenofsky helped the Hawks reach the championship game of the 2013 MAAC Men's Soccer Tournament, where they eventually fell on penalties to the Quinnipiac Bobcats.

Klenofsky cemented his role as the program's starting keeper ahead of his sophomore year. Again, Klenofsky lead the nation with a 0.48 goals-against average, as well finishing second in the nation and MAAC in save percentage (.880). Klenofsky was only behind fellow Kicker, Matt Turner. Klenofsky's record in 2014 proved to be 11–4–6 which included 12 shoutouts, which stands as the fourth all-time in a single season at the university. Klenofsky continued his success in his junior and senior seasons earned All-MAAC First Team, ECAC All-Star and NSCAA All-Northeast Regional Honors. He finished in the Top 5 of best save percentages and goals-against averages of NCAA keepers his final two years of college.

=== Senior ===
Ahead of the 2017 MLS SuperDraft, Klenofsky went on trial to Premier League side, Everton, although it was unknown if he was offered a contract. Klenofsky ended up partaking in the Draft, where he was selected in the third round, with the 34th overall pick by D.C. United. Klenofsky was offered a contract in February 2017. He was subsequently sent on loan to the Richmond Kickers, where he made his professional debut on April 8, 2017, in a 1–0 home loss to Louisville City FC. Klenofsky played the entire match. On November 28, 2017, his contract option with United was declined.

On July 31, 2018, Israeli second-division side Hapoel Marmorek acquired Klenofsky from Richmond Kickers.

On March 5, 2019, Klenofsky signed with Toronto FC II. On September 2, 2020, Klenofsky was loaned to USL Championship side Tacoma Defiance for the remainder of the season. He was released by Toronto FC II after they declined his option for the 2021 season.

== Coaching career ==
Klenofsky began his coaching career as the goalkeeper coach at Fairleigh Dickinson University in 2018, where he wrote and facilitated goalkeeper training sessions and assisted with the day-to-day operations. In 2021, he joined the University of South Florida Bulls as a volunteer assistant coach, where he will work with the team's goalkeepers.
