= 2013 VCU Rams men's soccer team =

VCU Rams
2013 season
- Athletic Director: (United States)
- Head Coach: (United States) David Giffard
- Atlantic 10 Conference: 3rd
- A10 Tournament: Semifinals
- NCAA Tournament: First round
- Top goalscorer: League: All: Kharlton Belmar (8)
Home colors	Away colors

The 2013 VCU Rams men's soccer team represented Virginia Commonwealth University during the 2013 NCAA Division I men's soccer season. The Rams played in the Atlantic 10 Conference for their second season.

== Competitions ==
=== Spring exhibitions ===
February 22, 2013 Spring 1	VCU	0–0	William & Mary	Williamsburg, Virginia
18:30 EDT		Report		Stadium: Albert-Daly Field

March 23, 2013 Spring 2	VCU	2–3	Richmond Kickers	North Chesterfield, Virginia
19:00 EDT				Stadium: Ukrop Park

March 30, 2013 Spring 3	Longwood	0–2	VCU	Richmond, Virginia
11:00 EDT				Stadium: Sports Backers Stadium

March 30, 2013 Spring 4	Louisburg	1–6	VCU	Richmond, Virginia
12:00 EDT				Stadium: Sports Backers Stadium

March 30, 2013 Spring 5	Navy	0–1	VCU	Richmond, Virginia
19:00 EDT				Stadium: Sports Backers Stadium

April 6, 2013 Spring 6	VCU	0–2	Wake Forest	Winston-Salem, North Carolina
19:00 EDT		Report	Okoli 76', 81'	Stadium: Spry Stadium

April 6, 2013 Spring 7	VCU	1–0	Wake Forest	Winston-Salem, North Carolina
21:00 EDT	Freibaum 21'	Report		Stadium: Spry Stadium

April 20, 2013 Spring 8	Liberty	0–4	VCU	Richmond, Virginia
11:00 EDT				Stadium: Sports Backers Stadium

April 20, 2013 Spring 9	VCU	2–2	Virginia	Charlottesville, Virginia
18:00 EDT				Stadium: Klöckner Stadium

=== Preseason ===
August 21, 2013 1	William & Mary	2–1	#24 VCU	Richmond, Virginia
19:00 EDT	Flesch 8'; Coffey 12'; Teiman (yellow card) 44'	Report	De Leon 77'	Stadium: Sports Backers Stadium; Attendance: Not reported

=== Regular season ===
==== Match reports ====
Below are confirmed games for 2013.

August 30, 2013 1	#17 UAB	4–0	#24 VCU	Richmond, Virginia
19:00 EDT	Navarette 18', 20'; Dajani 30'; Howze (yellow card) 32'; Wickham (yellow card) 33'; Ruiz 55'	Report		Stadium: Sports Backers Stadium; Attendance: 874; Referee: Scott Johnson
Note: VCU Tournament

September 1, 2013 2	Old Dominion	0–0	#24 VCU	Richmond, Virginia
19:00 EDT				Stadium: Sports Backers Stadium
Note: VCU Tournament; match postponed in the 18th minute due to severe weather

September 6, 2013 3	#9 New Mexico	1–1 (a.e.t.)	VCU	Richmond, Virginia
19:00 EDT	Rogers 44'; McKendry (yellow card) 88'; Miele (yellow card) 105'	Report	Fisher 56'	Stadium: Sports Backers Stadium; Attendance: 835; Referee: Mike Stutt

September 8, 2013 4	VCU	3–2	#13 Maryland	College Park, Maryland
19:00 EDT	Manel 78' (pen.); Belmar 79' (yellow card) 80'; Fisher 87'	Report	Pace 33'; Odoi-Atsem 71'	Stadium: Ludwig Field; Attendance: 1,611; Referee: Peter Dhima

September 13, 2013 5	#19 VCU	1–0	#7 Akron	Akron, Ohio
19:00 EDT	Castillo 75'; Monge Solano (yellow card) 86'		Quinn (yellow card) 79'	Stadium: Cub Cadet Field; Attendance: 3,319; Referee: Abbey Okulaja
Note: The University of Akron Tournament

September 15, 2013 6	#19 VCU	1–0	Niagara	Akron, Ohio
12:00 EDT	50' (o.g.)			Stadium: Cub Cadet Field
Note: The University of Akron Tournament

September 21, 2013 7	#25 Coastal Carolina	1–0	#8 VCU	Richmond, Virginia
18:00 EDT				Stadium: Sports Backers Stadium; Attendance: 609

September 24, 2013 8	#8 VCU	1–2	#9 Wake Forest	Winston-Salem, North Carolina
19:00 EDT	Barnathan 19'	Report	Okoli (red card) 23'; Watts (yellow card) 24'; Ibikunle 37'; Fink 54'	Stadium: Spry Stadium; Attendance: 719; Referee: Fotis Bazakos

October 1, 2013 9	#17 VCU	1–2 (a.e.t.)	Virginia	Charlottesville, Virginia
19:00 EDT	Shiffman (yellow card) 61'; Belmar 65'	Report	Madison 20'; Wharton (yellow card) 35'; Poarch (yellow card) 69'; Bird 107'	Stadium: Klöckner Stadium; Attendance: 1,280; Referee: Mark Kadlecik

October 6, 2013 10	#22 Saint Louis	1–2	VCU	Richmond, Virginia
13:00 EDT	Graydon 37'; Sweetin (yellow card) 73'		Harvey 74'; Manel 85'	Stadium: Sports Backers Stadium; Attendance: 439; Referee: Shaun Papperman

October 11, 2013 11	Massachusetts	0–4	VCU	Richmond, Virginia
19:30 EDT		Report	Belmar 9'; Castillo 20'; Costa-Dorsey 77'; Duffie 84'	Stadium: Sports Backers Stadium; Attendance: 981; Referee: Mark Gorak

October 13, 2013 12	Rhode Island	1–3	VCU	Richmond, Virginia
14:30 EDT	Sykes 88'	Report	Duffie 12'; Harvey 82'; Manel 89'	Stadium: Sports Backers Stadium; Attendance: 436; Referee: Mike Stutt

October 18, 2013 13	Indiana	0–1	VCU	Richmond, Virginia
19:00 EDT	Vollmer (yellow card) 27'	Report	Castillo 68' (pen.); Shiffman (yellow card) 85'; Fisher (yellow card) 88'	Stadium: Sports Backers Stadium; Attendance: 1,247; Referee: Bill Dittmar

October 20, 2013 14	VCU	0–0 (a.e.t.)	George Mason	Fairfax, Virginia
19:00 EDT				Stadium: George Mason Stadium

October 25, 2013 15	La Salle	0–3	#24 VCU	Richmond, Virginia
19:00 EDT		Report	Castillo 26', 81'; Costa-Dorsey 76'	Stadium: Sports Backers Stadium; Attendance: 947; Referee: Danish Sadaat

October 27, 2013 16	#24 VCU	0–1	Saint Joseph's	Philadelphia, Pennsylvania
13:00 EDT		Report	McFadden 85'	Stadium: Finnesey Field; Attendance: 487; Referee: Thomas Brown

November 3, 2013 17	Fordham	0–3	VCU	Richmond, Virginia
19:00 EDT	Walano (yellow card) 49'	Report	Harvey 7'; Herrera Meraz 52'; Belmar 72'	Stadium: Sports Backers Stadium; Attendance: 522; Referee: Zach Reynolds

November 8, 2013 18	VCU	2–1	St. Bonaventure	Olean, New York
15:00 EDT	Belmar 65', 70' (yellow card) 88'	Report	Iannacito (yellow card) 66'; Perillo 88'	Stadium: McGraw-Jennings Field; Attendance: 73

November 10, 2013 19	VCU	0–3	Duquesne	Pittsburgh, Pennsylvania
15:00 EDT				Stadium: Rooney Field

=== Atlantic 10 Tournament ===
November 14, 2012 Quarterfinals	#6 Duquesne	1–2	#3 VCU	Dayton, Ohio
14:00 EDT	De Villardi 4'; Disomma (yellow card) 89'	Report	Harvey 16'; Fisher 87'	Stadium: Baujan Field; Attendance: 149; Referee: Mark Garcia

November 15, 2012 Semifinals	#2 George Mason	3–2 (a.e.t.)	#3 VCU	Dayton, Ohio
17:00 EDT	Herstek 27'; Arjona (yellow card) 63'; Harmouche 64'; Miller (yellow card) 83'; Mulgrew 91'	Report	Castillo 19'; Herrera Meraz (yellow card) 20'; Bowie (yellow card) 62'; Belmar 80'	Stadium: Baujan Field; Attendance: 168; Referee: Shaun Papperman

=== NCAA Tournament ===
November 21, 2013 First round	VCU	0–3	Navy	Richmond, Virginia
19:00 EDT	Belmar (yellow card) 54'	Report	Sanchez 68'; Fries 71', 76'	Stadium: Sports Backers Stadium; Attendance: 993; Referee: Bill Dittmar

== Statistics ==
=== Appearances and goals ===
No.	Pos	Nat	Player	Total		Regular season		A-10 Tournament		NCAA Tournament	
No.	Pos	Nat	Player	Apps	Goals	Apps	Goals	Apps	Goals	Apps	Goals
1	GK	(United States) USA	Michael Gaffary	0	0	0+0	0	0+0	0	0+0	0
2	DF	(United States) USA	Isaac Owusu	11	0	8+3	0	0+0	0	0+0	0
3	DF	(Costa Rica) CRC	Dennis Castillo	17	5	17+0	5	0+0	0	0+0	0
4	DF	(United States) USA	Garrett Harvey	16	3	9+7	3	0+0	0	0+0	0
5	MF	(Costa Rica) CRC	Pablo Paz	4	0	0+4	0	0+0	0	0+0	0
6	MF	(United States) USA	Ray De Leon	6	0	1+5	0	0+0	0	0+0	0
7	DF	(Costa Rica) CRC	Juan Monge Solano	17	0	17+0	0	0+0	0	0+0	0
8	MF	(United States) USA	Dakota Barnathan	15	1	9+6	1	0+0	0	0+0	0
10	MF	(Jamaica) JAM	Romena Bowie	15	0	9+6	0	0+0	0	0+0	0
12	FW	(United States) USA	Kharlton Belmar	17	7	17+0	7	0+0	0	0+0	0
13	MF	(United States) USA	Greg Boehme	0	0	0+0	0	0+0	0	0+0	0
14	MF	(Mexico) MEX	Mario Herrera Meraz	13	1	5+8	1	0+0	0	0+0	0
15	DF	(Honduras) HON	Juan Fajardo	1	0	0+1	0	0+0	0	0+0	0
16	MF	(United States) USA	Ritchie Duffie	17	2	16+1	2	0+0	0	0+0	0
17	DF	(United States) USA	Gene Daniels	8	0	0+8	0	0+0	0	0+0	0
18	MF	(United States) USA	Nate Shiffman	17	0	16+1	0	0+0	0	0+0	0
19	DF	(Senegal) SEN	Assane Keita	17	0	17+0	0	0+0	0	0+0	0
21	GK	(United States) USA	Andrew Wells	17	0	17+0	0	0+0	0	0+0	0
22	FW	(Germany) GER	Rahim Costa-Dorsey	10	2	1+9	2	0+0	0	0+0	0
23	FW	(Spain) ESP	Jose Manel	17	3	12+5	3	0+0	0	0+0	0
24	MF	(United States) USA	Devon Fisher	17	2	16+1	2	0+0	0	0+0	0
25	DF	(United States) USA	Jack Bates	5	0	0+5	0	0+0	0	0+0	0
26	DF	(United States) USA	Finley Wyatt	0	0	0+0	0	0+0	0	0+0	0
27	FW	(United States) USA	Matt Freibaum	0	0	0+0	0	0+0	0	0+0	0
28	MF	(United States) USA	Shaquille Richards	0	0	0+0	0	0+0	0	0+0	0
29	MF	(United States) USA	Donovan Arias	0	0	0+0	0	0+0	0	0+0	0
30	GK	(United States) USA	Marco Lujan	0	0	0+0	0	0+0	0	0+0	0
31	GK	(Canada) CAN	Garrett Cyprus	1	0	0+1	0	0+0	0	0+0	0
33	FW	(United States) USA	Joel Teston	0	0	0+0	0	0+0	0	0+0	0
34	DF	(United States) USA	Bobby Hopper	0	0	0+0	0	0+0	0	0+0	0
35	MF	(United States) USA	Jason McGlothern	1	0	0+1	0	0+0	0	0+0	0

Source: VCU Athletics

=== Top goalscorers ===
Rank	Pos	No.	Player	Regular season	A-10 Tournament	NCAA Tournament	Total
1	FW	12	Kharlton Belmar	7	1	0	8
2	DF	5	Dennis Castillo	5	1	0	6
3	DF	4	Garrett Harvey	3	1	0	4
4	FW	22	Jose Manel	3	0	0	3
4	MF	24	Devon Fisher	2	1	0	3
6	FW	22	Rahim Costa-Dorsey	2	0	0	2
6	MF	16	Ritchie Duffie	2	0	0	2
8	MF	8	Dakota Barnathan	1	0	0	1
8	MF	14	Mario Herrera Meraz	1	0	0	1

== Transfers ==
=== In ===
No.	Pos.	Player	Transferred from	Fee/notes	Date	Source
22	FW	(Germany) Rahim Costa-Dorsey	(United States) Mount Vernon Majors	Committed to program	June 10, 2013	
33	FW	(United States) Joel Teston	(United States) McLean Youth Soccer	Committed to program	June 10, 2013	

=== Out ===
No.	Pos.	Player	Transferred to	Fee/notes	Date	Source
11	FW	(Jamaica) Jason Johnson	(United States) Houston Dynamo	Signed in the 2013 MLS SuperDraft	January 14, 2013	
8	MF	(Colombia) Juan Arbelaez	(Canada) Montreal Impact	Signed in the 2013 MLS Supplemental Draft	January 21, 2013	
1	GK	(United States) Clark Hankins		Graduated	May 14, 2013	
5	MF	(Lebanon) Joseph Haboush	(United States) Richmond Kickers	Free	May 14, 2013	
15	MF	(United States) Chris Maimone	(United States) RVA Football Club	Graduated	May 14, 2013	
22	MF	(United States) Brad Seymour	(United States) RVA Football Club	Graduated	May 14, 2013	
17	MF	(United States) Peter Lee	(United States) Army Black Knights	Transferred	June 30, 2013	
20	FW	(United States) K.C. Onyeador		Cut from team	June 30, 2013	
32	MF	(United States) Cameron Foster	(United States) High Point Panthers	Transferred	June 30, 2013	
