= 2013 Ivy League men's soccer season =

Ivy League
- Season: 2013
- Champions: TBD
- Premiers: TBD
- NCAA Tournament: TBD

The 2013 Ivy League men's soccer season was the 59th season of men's college soccer in the conference. The league was part of the 2013 NCAA Division I men's soccer season. The Cornell Big Red were the defending champions.

The champion of the season were the Penn Quakers.

== Teams ==
=== Stadia and location ===
Team	Location	Stadium	Capacity
Brown Bears	Providence, Rhode Island	Stevenson Field	3,500
Columbia Lions	New York City, New York	Columbia Soccer Stadium	3,500
Cornell Big Red	Ithaca, New York	Berman Field	1,000
Dartmouth Big Green	Hanover, New Hampshire	Burnham Field	1,600
Harvard Crimson	Cambridge, Massachusetts	Soldiers Field Soccer Stadium	2,500
Penn Quakers	Philadelphia, Pennsylvania	Rhodes Field	2,000
Princeton Tigers	Princeton, New Jersey	Roberts Stadium	1,750
Yale Bulldogs	New Haven, Connecticut	Reese Stadium	3,000
