= 2013 Southern Conference men's soccer season =

Southern Conference
- Season: 2013
- Champions: TBD
- Premiers: TBD
- NCAA Tournament: TBD

2013 Southern Conference men's soccer standings
	Conf.					Overall
Team	W		L		T	W		L		T
Wofford	5	–	1	–	0	11	–	7	–	1
No. 22 Elon ‡	4	–	2	–	0	15	–	5	–	3
UNC Greensboro	3	–	2	–	1	8	–	9	–	2
Furman	2	–	2	–	2	11	–	5	–	2
Georgia Southern	2	–	4	–	0	9	–	10	–	0
Davidson	2	–	4	–	0	8	–	10	–	1
Appalachian State	1	–	4	–	1	4	–	7	–	7
‡ - Tournament champion + - Invited to the NCAA Division I Men's Soccer Championship; As of December 17, 2013; Rankings from NSCAA

The 2013 Southern Conference men's soccer season will be the 18th season of men's varsity soccer in the conference. It will be the last season for the Davidson Wildcats, who will leave for the Atlantic 10 Conference. Two other schools, Appalachian State and Georgia Southern, will leave for the Sun Belt Conference in 2014, but both men's soccer teams are expected to remain SoCon affiliates because the Sun Belt only sponsors soccer for women. In fact, it has already been confirmed that Appalachian State will remain in SoCon men's soccer.

The defending regular season and tournament champions are the Elon Phoenix.

== Changes from 2012 ==
- College of Charleston left for the Colonial Athletic Association.

== Teams ==
=== Stadia and locations ===
Team	Location	Stadium	Capacity
Appalachian State Mountaineers	Boone, North Carolina	ASU Soccer Stadium	1,500
Davidson Wildcats	Davidson, North Carolina	Richardson Stadium	6,000
Elon Phoenix	Elon, North Carolina	Rudd Field	2,000
Furman Paladins	Greenville, South Carolina	Stone III Stadium	3,000
Georgia Southern Eagles	Statesboro, Georgia	Eagle Field	500
UNC Greensboro Spartans	Greensboro, North Carolina	UNCG Soccer Stadium	3,540
Wofford Terriers	Spartanburg, South Carolina	Snyder Field	2,250

2013 Southern Conference men's soccer standings
	Conf.					Overall
Team	W		L		T	W		L		T
Wofford	5	–	1	–	0	11	–	7	–	1
No. 22 Elon ‡	4	–	2	–	0	15	–	5	–	3
UNC Greensboro	3	–	2	–	1	8	–	9	–	2
Furman	2	–	2	–	2	11	–	5	–	2
Georgia Southern	2	–	4	–	0	9	–	10	–	0
Davidson	2	–	4	–	0	8	–	10	–	1
Appalachian State	1	–	4	–	1	4	–	7	–	7
‡ - Tournament champion + - Invited to the NCAA Division I Men's Soccer Championship; As of December 17, 2013; Rankings from NSCAA

== SoCon Tournament ==
The format for the 2013 Southern Conference Men's Soccer Tournament was announced in the Fall of 2013.

== Results ==
Home/Away	ASU	DAV	ELN	FUR	GSU	UNCG	WOF
Appalachian State Mountaineers							
Davidson Wildcats							
Elon Phoenix							
Furman Paladins							
Georgia Southern Eagles							
UNC Greensboro Spartans							
Wofford Terriers							
