= 2013 Mid-American Conference men's soccer season =

2013 American association football competition

Mid-American Conference
- Season: 2013
- Champions: Akron
- MAC Tourney Winner: Akron
- NCAA Tournament: Akron

2013 Mid-American Conference men's soccer standings
	Conf.					Overall
Team	W		L		T	W		L		T
No. 17 Akron ‡	5	–	1	–	0	17	–	4	–	1
Western Michigan	4	–	1	–	1	9	–	9	–	1
Hartwick	3	–	2	–	1	5	–	9	–	4
West Virginia	2	–	2	–	2	7	–	7	–	5
Bowling Green	2	–	2	–	2	6	–	7	–	6
Buffalo	1	–	4	–	1	3	–	11	–	4
Northern Illinois	0	–	5	–	1	4	–	13	–	1
‡ - Tournament champion + - Invited to the NCAA Division I Men's Soccer Championship; As of December 17, 2013; Rankings from NSCAA

The 2013 Mid-American Conference men's soccer season will be the 21st season of men's varsity soccer in the conference.

The defending regular season and tournament champions are the Akron Zips.

== Changes from 2012 ==
Florida Atlantic left when it was confirmed as a full member of Conference USA, which sponsors men's soccer, effective with the 2013–14 school year.

== Teams ==
=== Stadia and locations ===
Team	Location	Stadium	Capacity
Akron Zips	Akron, Ohio	FirstEnergy Stadium	4,000
Bowling Green Falcons	Bowling Green, Ohio	Cochrane Stadium	1,000
Buffalo Bulls	Amherst, New York	UB Stadium	29,013
Hartwick Hawks	Oneonta, New York	Elmore Field	1,000
Northern Illinois Huskies	DeKalb, Illinois	NIU Soccer and Track & Field Complex	1,500
West Virginia Mountaineers	Morgantown, West Virginia	Dlesk Stadium	1,600
Western Michigan Broncos	Kalamazoo, Michigan	WMU Soccer Complex	500

== MAC Tournament ==
The format for the 2013 MAC Men's Soccer Tournament will be announced in the Fall of 2013.

== Results ==
Home/Away	AKR	BG	BUF	HAR	NIU	WVU	WMU
Akron Zips							
Bowling Green Falcons							
Buffalo Bulls							
Hartwick Hawks							
Northern Illinois Huskies							
West Virginia Mountaineers							
Western Michigan Broncos							
