= 2013 Atlantic Sun Conference men's soccer season =

Atlantic Sun Conference
- Season: 2013
- Champions: TBD
- Premiers: TBD
- NCAA Tournament: TBD

The 2013 Atlantic Sun Conference men's soccer season will be the 35th season of men's varsity soccer in the conference. It will be the last A-Sun season for East Tennessee State and Mercer, both of which will move to the Southern Conference in July 2014.

The defending regular season and tournament champions are the Florida Gulf Coast Eagles.

== Teams ==
=== Stadia and locations ===
Team	Location	Stadium	Capacity
East Tennessee State Buccaneers	Johnson City, Tennessee	Summers-Taylor Stadium	2,000
Florida Gulf Coast Eagles	Fort Myers, Florida	FGCU Soccer Complex	1,000
Jacksonville Dolphins	Jacksonville, Florida	Ashley Sports Complex	500
Lipscomb Bisons	Nashville, Tennessee	Lipscomb Soccer Complex	250
Mercer Bears	Macon, Georgia	Bear Field	300
North Florida Ospreys	Jacksonville, Florida	Hodges Stadium	9,400
Northern Kentucky Norse	Highland Heights, Kentucky	NKU Soccer Stadium	600
Stetson Hatters	DeLand, Florida	Stetson Soccer Field	900
South Carolina Upstate Spartans	Spartanburg, South Carolina	County University Soccer Stadium	3,000

=== Personnel ===
Team	Head coach	Captain	Shirt supplier
East Tennessee State Buccaneers	(United States) Scott Calabrese	TBA	Nike
Florida Gulf Coast Eagles	(United States) Bob Butehorn	TBA	Adidas
Jacksonville Dolphins	(United States) Ryan Pratt	TBA	Nike
Lipscomb Bisons	(United States) Charles Morrow	TBA	Nike
Mercer Bears	(United States) Brad Ruzzo	TBA	Adidas
North Florida Ospreys	(Cuba) Derek Marinatos	TBA	Nike
Northern Kentucky Norse	(United States) John Basalyga	TBA	Under Armour
Stetson Hatters	(United States) Logan Fleck	TBA	Nike
South Carolina Upstate Spartans	(United States) Greg Hooks	TBA	Nike

== Standings ==
2013 Atlantic Sun Conference men's soccer standings
	Conf.					Overall
Team	W		L		T	W		L		T
Florida Gulf Coast	6	–	1	–	1	8	–	7	–	2
East Tennessee State ‡	5	–	2	–	1	10	–	6	–	4
Northern Kentucky #	5	–	2	–	1	9	–	4	–	6
Lipscomb	4	–	3	–	1	9	–	9	–	2
Mercer	3	–	4	–	1	5	–	14	–	1
North Florida	2	–	4	–	2	8	–	7	–	3
Jacksonville	2	–	4	–	2	4	–	11	–	3
Stetson	2	–	4	–	2	3	–	10	–	4
USC Upstate	1	–	6	–	1	1	–	11	–	2
‡ - Tournament champion + - Invited to the NCAA Division I Men's Soccer Championship # - Ineligible (In transition); As of November 21, 2013; Rankings from NSCAA

== A-Sun Tournament ==
The format for the 2013 Atlantic Sun Conference Men's Soccer Tournament will be announced in the Fall of 2013.

== Results ==
Home/Away	ETS	FGC	JAX	LIP	MER	UNF	NKU	STE	SCU
East Tennessee State Buccaneers									
Florida Gulf Coast Eagles									
Jacksonville Dolphins									
Lipscomb Bisons									
Mercer Bears									
North Florida Ospreys									
Northern Kentucky Norse									
Stetson Hatters									
South Carolina Upstate Spartans									

== See also ==
- Atlantic Sun Conference
- 2013 Atlantic Sun Conference Men's Soccer Tournament
- 2013 NCAA Division I men's soccer season
- 2013 in American soccer
