= 2020 Northeast Conference men's soccer season =

- League: NCAA Division I
- Sport: Soccer
- Duration: February 22, 2021 – May 17, 2021
- Teams: 10

2020 MLS SuperDraft
- Top draft pick: TBD

Regular Season
- Season champions: TBD
- Season MVP: TBD
- Top scorer: TBD

NEC Tournament
- Champions: TBD
- Finals MVP: TBD

NEC men's soccer seasons
- ← 2019

The 2020 Northeast Conference men's soccer season will be the 40th season of men's varsity soccer in the conference. The season was slated to begin on August 29, 2020 and conclude on November 14, 2020. Due to the ongoing COVID-19 pandemic, the season was postponed, and is set to begin in Spring of 2021.

== Teams ==
=== Stadiums and locations ===
2020 Northeast Conference men's soccer standings
	Conf.					Overall
Team	W		L		T	W		L		T
St. Francis Brooklyn ‡	5	–	1	–	1	6	–	1	–	3
LIU	3	–	1	–	3	3	–	1	–	4
Central Connecticut	3	–	3	–	1	3	–	3	–	1
Merrimack ^{#}	2	–	1	–	2	2	–	1	–	2
Bryant	2	–	2	–	2	2	–	2	–	2
Fairleigh Dickinson	2	–	3	–	1	2	–	5	–	1
Mount St. Mary's	1	–	3	–	2	1	–	5	–	2
Sacred Heart	1	–	5	–	0	1	–	6	–	0
‡ – 2020 NEC Tournament champion + – Also invited to the 2020 NCAA tournament ^{#} – Ineligible for post-season (In transition); As of May 3, 2021; Rankings from United Soccer Coaches

Team	Location	Stadium	Capacity
Bryant Bulldogs	Smithfield, Rhode Island	Bulldog Stadium	5,500
Central Connecticut Blue Devils	New Britain, Connecticut	CCSU Soccer Field	1000
Fairleigh Dickinson Knights	Florham Park, New Jersey	FDU Stadium	500
LIU Sharks	Brookville, New York	LIU Soccer Park	160
Merrimack	North Andover, Massachusetts	Martone-Mejail Field	3,000
Mount St. Mary's	Emmitsburg, Maryland	Waldron Family Stadium	1,000
Robert Morris Colonials	Moon Township, Pennsylvania	North Athletic Complex	800
Sacred Heart Pioneers	Fairfield, Connecticut	Campus Field	3,334
St. Francis Brooklyn Terriers	Brooklyn, New York	Brooklyn Bridge Park	300
Saint Francis Red Flash	Loretto, Pennsylvania	Stokes Soccerplex	500

== Spring 2021 season ==
The season will start on February 22 and end on April 8, with each team playing 8 conference matches. The 2020 NEC Championship match will be contested the week of April 12–18 with the No. 1 seed hosting the No. 2 seed to determine the conference’s automatic qualifier to the NCAA Tournament.

=== Preseason poll ===
The preseason poll will be released in December 2020 or January 2021.

	Team ranking	Points	First place votes
1.			
2.			
3.			
4.			
5.			
6.			
7.			
8.			
9.			
10.			

=== Preseason national polls ===
The preseason national polls were originally to be released in July and August 2020. Only CollegeSoccerNews.com released a preseason poll for 2020.

	UnitedSoccer	CSN	SoccerAmerica	Top DrawerSoccer
Bryant	—	—	—	—
Central Connecticut	—	—	—	—
Fairleigh Dickinson	—	—	—	—
LIU	—	—	—	—
Merrimach	—	—	—	—
Mount St. Mary's	—	—	—	—
Robert Morris	—	—	—	—
Sacred Heart	—	—	—	—
St. Francis Brooklyn	—	—	—	—
Saint Francis	—	—	—	—

=== Early season tournaments ===
Early season tournaments will be announced in late Fall 2020 and winter 2021.
