= 2013 American Athletic Conference men's soccer season =

American Athletic Conference
- Season: 2013
- Champions: TBD
- Premiers: TBD
- NCAA Tournament: TBD

The 2013 American Athletic Conference men's soccer season is the 18th season of men's varsity soccer in the conference originally known as the Big East Conference. Following a period of turmoil and near-constant turnover of membership, culminating in a split into two leagues along football lines, the schools that sponsor FBS football sold the Big East name to the non-FBS schools, which began operating as the Big East Conference in July 2013. The FBS schools are operating under the original Big East charter with the new name of American Athletic Conference.

This was the final season in the Big East and American Athletic Conference for two member schools. Louisville and Rutgers will left in 2014 for the Atlantic Coast Conference and Big Ten, respectively.

== Changes from 2012 ==
- The so-called "Catholic 7" schools—DePaul, Georgetown, Marquette, Providence, St. John's, Seton Hall, and Villanova—left to form the new Big East.
- Three schools left for the ACC. Pittsburgh and Syracuse left for all sports including FBS football; Notre Dame left for non-football sports but remains an FBS independent.
- Memphis, SMU, and UCF joined from Conference USA. Temple, which had joined the original Big East for football in 2012, brought in the rest of its athletic program (except three sports not sponsored by The American) from the Atlantic 10 Conference.

== Teams ==
=== Stadia and locations ===
Team	Location	Stadium	Capacity
Cincinnati Bearcats	Cincinnati, Ohio	Gettler Stadium	7,500
Connecticut Huskies	Storrs, Connecticut	Morrone Stadium	4,407
Louisville Cardinals	Louisville, Kentucky	Cardinal Park	2,200
Memphis Tigers	Memphis, Tennessee	Mike Rose Soccer Complex	2,500
Rutgers Scarlet Knights	Piscataway, New Jersey	Yurcak Field	5,000
South Florida Bulls	Tampa, Florida	Corbett Soccer Stadium	4,000
SMU Mustangs	University Park, Texas	Westcott Field	4,000
Temple Owls	Philadelphia, Pennsylvania	Ambler Field	300
UCF Knights	Orlando, Florida	UCF Soccer and Track Stadium	2,000

== Results ==
Home/Away	CIN	CON	LOU	MEM	RUT	USF	SMU	TEM	UCF
Cincinnati Bearcats									
Connecticut Huskies									
Louisville Cardinals									
Memphis Tigers									
Rutgers Scarlet Knights									
South Florida Bulls									
SMU Mustangs									
Temple Owls									
UCF Knights									

== See also ==
- American Athletic Conference
- 2013 American Athletic Conference Men's Soccer Tournament
- 2013 NCAA Division I men's soccer season
- 2013 in American soccer
