= 2013 Summit League men's soccer season =

Summit League
- Season: 2013
- Champions: TBD
- Premiers: TBD
- NCAA Tournament: TBD

The 2013 Summit League men's soccer season was the eighth season of men's varsity soccer in the conference. The venue for the 2013 Summit League Men's Soccer Tournament has yet been announced.

The defending regular season champions are the Oakland Golden Grizzlies, but the school left for the Horizon League at the end of the 2012–13 school year. The Western Illinois Leathernecks are the defending tournament champions.

== Changes from 2012 ==
- As noted above, Oakland departed for the Horizon League.
- The Summit and the Western Athletic Conference effectively swapped members, with Denver moving from the WAC to The Summit and UMKC making the opposite move.

== Teams ==
=== Stadia and locations ===
Team	Location	Stadium	Capacity
Denver Pioneers	Denver, Colorado	University of Denver Soccer Stadium	2,000
Eastern Illinois Panthers	Charleston, Illinois	Lakeside Soccer Field	—N/a
IPFW Mastodons	Fort Wayne, Indiana	Hefner Stadium	2,000
IUPUI Jaguars	Indianapolis, Indiana	Carroll Stadium	12,100
Omaha Mavericks	Omaha, Nebraska	UNO Soccer Field	100
Oral Roberts Golden Eagles	Tulsa, Oklahoma	Case Soccer Complex	1,000
Western Illinois Leathernecks	Macomb, Illinois	MacKenzie Alumni Field	1,000

- North Dakota State, South Dakota and South Dakota State do not sponsor men's soccer

== Summit League Tournament ==
The format for the 2013 The Summit League Men's Soccer Tournament will be announced in the fall of 2013.

== Results ==
Home/Away	DU	EIU	IFW	IPI	OMA	ORU	WIU
Denver Pioneers							
Eastern Illinois Panthers							
IPFW Mastodons							
IUPUI Jaguars							
Omaha Mavericks							
Oral Roberts Golden Eagles							
Western Illinois Leathernecks							
