= 2013 Colonial Athletic Association men's soccer season =

CAA
- Season: 2013
- Champions: Drexel
- Premiers: Drexel
- NCAA Tournament: TBD

The 2013 Colonial Athletic Association men's soccer season was the 18th season of men's varsity soccer in the conference. The season marked the first for the incoming Charleston Cougars. The 2013 CAA Men's Soccer Tournament was played at Vidas Field on the campus of regular-season champion Drexel in Philadelphia.

The defending regular season champions were the Drexel Dragons. The Northeastern Huskies were the defending tournament champions. Drexel successfully defended its regular-season title from last season, and also added the conference tournament crown.

== Changes from 2012 ==
- The College of Charleston joined the CAA from the Southern Conference.
- George Mason left the CAA for the Atlantic 10 Conference.
- Georgia State left the CAA for the Sun Belt Conference, which does not sponsor the sport. The program will compete as an independent team.
- Old Dominion left the CAA for Conference USA.
- Towson dropped men's soccer due to budget concerns.

== Teams ==
=== Stadiums and locations ===
Team	Location	Stadium	Capacity
Charleston Cougars	Charleston, South Carolina	Patriots Point Soccer Stadium	2,200
Delaware Fighting Blue Hens	Newark, Delaware	Delaware Mini Stadium	1,500
Drexel Dragons	Philadelphia, Pennsylvania	Vidas Field	2,750
Hofstra Pride	Hempstead, New York	Hofstra Soccer Stadium	2,000
James Madison Dukes	Harrisonburg, Virginia	University Park	1,500
Northeastern Huskies	Boston, Massachusetts	Parsons Field	7,000
UNC Wilmington Seahawks	Wilmington, North Carolina	UNCW Soccer Stadium	1,000
William & Mary Tribe	Williamsburg, Virginia	Albert-Daly Field	2,271

== Standings ==
2013 CAA men's soccer standings

== CAA Tournament ==
The format for the 2013 CAA Men's Soccer Tournament will be announced in the Fall of 2013.

== Results ==
Home/Away	COC	DEL	DRE	HOF	JMU	NOR	UNCW	W&M
Charleston Cougars								
Delaware Fighting Blue Hens								
Drexel Dragons								
Hofstra Pride								
James Madison Dukes								
Northeastern Huskies								
UNC Wilmington Seahawks								
William & Mary Tribe								
