= 2013 American Athletic Conference men's soccer tournament =

- Classification: Division I
- Teams: 9
- Matches: 8
- Quarterfinals site: Campus Sites
- Semifinals site: Toyota Stadium; Frisco, TX
- Finals site: Toyota Stadium; Frisco, TX
- Champions: South Florida (2 title)
- Winning coach: George Kiefer (2 title)
- Broadcast: ESPN3 (Finals only)

2013 American Athletic Conference men's soccer standings
	Conf.					Overall
Team	W		L		T	W		L		T
No. 18 Louisville +	5	–	1	–	2	11	–	5	–	4
No. 9 Connecticut +	4	–	0	–	4	12	–	3	–	8
UCF	4	–	1	–	3	8	–	5	–	5
Temple	3	–	1	–	4	10	–	4	–	4
South Florida ‡	2	–	2	–	4	8	–	4	–	9
Memphis	3	–	5	–	0	9	–	8	–	1
SMU	2	–	4	–	2	3	–	12	–	2
Rutgers	2	–	5	–	1	7	–	11	–	2
Cincinnati	1	–	7	–	0	6	–	12	–	1
‡ - Tournament champion + - Invited to the NCAA Division I Men's Soccer Championship; As of December 17, 2013 (UTC); Rankings from NSCAA

The 2013 American Athletic Conference men's soccer tournament was the first postseason tournament in men's soccer for the American Athletic Conference (the American) following the 2013 split of the original Big East Conference along football lines. The "Big East" name was purchased by the seven non-FBS football schools of the original conference, while the Big East charter was retained by the FBS schools now operating as The American. Including the history of the original Big East, which is jointly claimed by both successor conferences, this was The American's 18th men's soccer tournament.

The tournament decided the American Athletic Conference champion and guaranteed representative into the 2013 NCAA Division I Men's Soccer Championship. Held at the Toyota Stadium in Frisco, Texas, the South Florida Bulls won the title.

== Bracket ==
First round
8	Rutgers	5
9	Cincinnati	1

Quarterfinals
1	Louisville	0
8	Rutgers	1
4	Temple	0
5	South Florida	1
3	UCF	2
6	Memphis	1
2	Connecticut	5
7	SMU	0

Semifinals
8	Rutgers	1
5	South Florida	2
3	UCF	0
2	Connecticut	2

Championship
5	South Florida (pen.)	0 (6)
2	Connecticut	0 (5)

== All-Tournament team ==
- Omar Vallejo, UCF
- Adria Beso Marco, Connecticut
- Andre Blake, Connecticut
- Sergio Campbell, Connecticut
- Cyle Larin, Connecticut
- David Greczek, Rutgers
- Samuel Hosseini, South Florida
- Edwin Moalosi, South Florida (most outstanding offensive player)
- Duane Muckette, South Florida
- Brentton Muhammad, South Florida (most outstanding defensive player)
- Stiven Salinas, South Florida

== See also ==
- American Athletic Conference
- 2013 American Athletic Conference men's soccer season
- 2013 NCAA Division I men's soccer season
- 2013 NCAA Division I Men's Soccer Championship
