= 2013 Western Athletic Conference men's soccer season =

Western Athletic Conference
- Season: 2013
- Champions: TBD
- Premiers: TBD
- NCAA Tournament: TBD

The 2013 Western Athletic Conference men's soccer season is the fifth season of men's varsity soccer in the conference, and the first since 1999. The conference first sponsored the sport in 1996, but after eight schools split from the WAC in 1999 to form the Mountain West Conference (MW), the WAC only played the 1999 season before disbanding its men's soccer league.

The current WAC men's soccer conference is functionally a reboot of the Mountain Pacific Sports Federation (MPSF) men's soccer league. Six of the eight teams that relaunched WAC men's soccer were MPSF members in the 2012 season, with Grand Canyon (moving from NCAA Division II) and UMKC (joining the WAC from The Summit League) the only exceptions. Two of these schools, Air Force and UNLV, were charter members of the WAC soccer conference in 1996 before leaving to form the MW.

After a near-complete turnover in the league membership between 2011 and 2013, the WAC was forced to drop football as a sponsored sport. This left the conference with only two sponsored men's team sports; under NCAA rules, Division I conferences are required to sponsor at least three team sports for each sex. In January 2013, the WAC announced it would add men's soccer to bring itself in compliance with this rule. At that time, three of the confirmed full WAC members for the 2013–14 school year—Grand Canyon and former MPSF men's soccer members CSU Bakersfield and Seattle—sponsored the sport. The WAC filled out its men's soccer membership by inviting the four remaining MPSF teams (Denver and New Mexico had already announced plans to leave the MPSF, respectively for The Summit League and Conference USA). After the January announcement, the WAC picked up an eighth men's soccer member when UMKC announced it would become a full member of the conference in 2013–14.

The Air Force Falcons, who were previously a MPSF member, entered the season as the defending MPSF champions.

== Current members ==
- Air Force
- CSU Bakersfield
- Grand Canyon
- Houston Baptist
- San Jose State
- Seattle
- UMKC
- UNLV

== Teams ==
=== Stadia and locations ===
Team	Location	Stadium	Capacity
Air Force Falcons	Colorado Springs, Colorado	Air Force Soccer Stadium	1,000
CSU Bakersfield Roadrunners	Bakersfield, California	CSUB Main Soccer Field	2,500
Grand Canyon Antelopes	Phoenix, Arizona	GCU Soccer Field	1,000
Houston Baptist Huskies	Houston, Texas	Sorrells Field	1,250
San Jose State Spartans	San Jose, California	Spartan Stadium	30,456
Seattle Redhawks	Seattle, Washington	Seattle University Soccer Stadium	3,000
UMKC Kangaroos	Kansas City, Missouri	Stanley H. Durwood Soccer Stadium	850
UNLV Rebels	Paradise, Nevada	Johann Memorial Field	2,500

- Chicago State, Utah Valley, and UTPA do not currently sponsor men's soccer. The first two of these schools will add the sport for the 2014–15 school year; UTPA will do the same a year later. Idaho (which will leave for the Big Sky Conference in July 2014) and New Mexico State do not sponsor the sport, and have no known plans to do so.

== WAC Tournament ==
The format for the 2013 WAC Men's Soccer Tournament will be announced in the Fall of 2013.

== Results ==
Home/Away	AF	BAK	GCU	HBU	SJS	SEA	UMKC	UNLV
Air Force Falcons								
CSU Bakersfield Roadrunners								
Grand Canyon Antelopes								
Houston Baptist Huskies								
San Jose State Spartans								
Seattle Redhawks								
UMKC Kangaroos								
UNLV Rebels								
