= 2013 Akron Zips men's soccer team =

American college soccer season

The 2013 Akron Zips men's soccer team represented the University of Akron during the 2013 NCAA Division I men's soccer season. The Zips entered the season as the defending MAC Regular Season and Tournament champions.

The team was led by first-year head coach Jared Embick.

== Competitions ==
=== Regular season ===
==== MAC Standings ====
2013 Mid-American Conference men's soccer standings
	Conf.					Overall
Team	W		L		T	W		L		T
No. 17 Akron ‡	5	–	1	–	0	17	–	4	–	1
Western Michigan	4	–	1	–	1	9	–	9	–	1
Hartwick	3	–	2	–	1	5	–	9	–	4
West Virginia	2	–	2	–	2	7	–	7	–	5
Bowling Green	2	–	2	–	2	6	–	7	–	6
Buffalo	1	–	4	–	1	3	–	11	–	4
Northern Illinois	0	–	5	–	1	4	–	13	–	1
‡ - Tournament champion + - Invited to the NCAA Division I Men's Soccer Championship; As of December 17, 2013; Rankings from NSCAA

==== Match reports ====
August 30, 2013 1	#8 Akron	2–0	College of Charleston	Charleston, South Carolina
19:30 EDT	Pina (yellow card) 70'; Quinn 80'; McGowan 87' (o.g.)	Report	Rajpaul (yellow card) 70'; Crook (red card) 80'; Peterson (yellow card) 87'	Stadium: Patriots Point Soccer Stadium; Attendance: 1,230; Referee: Jeff Nevin
Note: College of Charleston Tournament

September 1, 2013 2	#8 Akron	1–0	Furman	Charleston, South Carolina
12:00 EDT	Brenes 58'	Report	Gandier (yellow card) 68'; Ortiz (yellow card) 88'	Stadium: Patriots Point Soccer Stadium; Attendance: 212; Referee: Patrick Whitman

September 6, 2013 3	#5 Akron	1–2 (a.e.t.)	#23 St. John's	Queens, New York
19:00 EDT	Souto (yellow card) 11'; Cross (yellow card) 42'; Brenes (yellow card) 69'; Stevenson 71'	Report	Godec (yellow card) 19' (goal) 74'; Thomas (yellow card) 56'; Sepe (yellow card) 81'; Osborne (yellow card) 98'; Mulligan 106'	Stadium: Belson Stadium; Attendance: 1,533; Referee: Hayden Cust

September 8, 2013 4	#5 Akron	2–1 (a.e.t.)	Rutgers	Piscataway, New Jersey
19:00 EDT	Caso (yellow card) 23'; Souders (yellow card) 82'; Serema 85'; Stevenson (yellow card) 87'; Gallego (yellow card) 99'; Brenes 105'	Report	Morgan (yellow card) 8' (red card) 87'; Setchell (yellow card) 38'; Eze 54'; Coroboz (yellow card) 57'; Hambleton (yellow card) 70'; Correra (yellow card) 87'	Stadium: Yurcak Field; Attendance: 718; Referee: Mark Allatin

September 13, 2013 5	#19 VCU	1–0	#7 Akron	Akron, Ohio
19:00 EDT				Stadium: Cub Cadet Field
Note: The University of Akron Tournament

September 15, 2013 6	San Diego State	1–2	#7 Akron	Akron, Ohio
14:30 EDT				Stadium: Cub Cadet Field
Note: The University of Akron Tournament

September 20, 2013 7	Bowling Green	0–1	Akron	Akron, Ohio
19:00 EDT				Stadium: Cub Cadet Field

September 24, 2013 8	Ohio State	0–1	Akron	Akron, Ohio
19:00 EDT				Stadium: Cub Cadet Field

September 29, 2013 9	Akron	1–0	West Virginia	Morgantown, West Virginia
19:00 EDT				Stadium: Dlesk Stadium

October 5, 2013 10	Hartwick	2–0	Akron	Akron, Ohio
19:00 EDT				Stadium: Cub Cadet Field

October 9, 2013 11	Akron	v	Cleveland State	Cleveland, Ohio
19:30 EDT				Stadium: Krenzler Field

October 15, 2013 12	#17 Wake Forest	v	Akron	Akron, Ohio
19:00 EDT				Stadium: Cub Cadet Field

October 18, 2013 13	Akron	v	Buffalo	Amherst, New York
19:00 EDT				Stadium: UB Stadium

October 23, 2013 14	Michigan State	v	Akron	Akron, Ohio
19:00 EDT				Stadium: Cub Cadet Field

October 26, 2013 15	Northern Illinois	v	Akron	Akron, Ohio
19:00 EDT				Stadium: Cub Cadet Field

October 30, 2013 16	Akron	v	Michigan	Ann Arbor, Michigan
19:30 EDT				Stadium: U-M Soccer Stadium

November 6, 2013 17	Penn State	v	Akron	Akron, Ohio
19:00 EDT				Stadium: Cub Cadet Field

November 9, 2013 18	Akron	v	Western Michigan	Kalamazoo, Michigan
19:00 EDT				Stadium: WMU Soccer Complex
