= 2013 Big East Conference men's soccer season =

Big East Conference
- Season: 2013
- Champions: Marquette
- NCAA Tournament: Creighton; Georgetown; Marquette, Providence; St. John's

The 2013 Big East Conference men's soccer season is the inaugural season for the newly formed offshoot of the original Big East Conference. The "new" Big East consists of the seven members of the original Big East that did not sponsor Division I FBS football (the so-called "Catholic 7"), plus invited founding members Butler, Creighton, and Xavier. The FBS schools sold the "Big East" name to the "Catholic 7" and are operating as the American Athletic Conference under the original Big East charter. Including the history of the original Big East, this will be the 18th season of men's soccer under the "Big East" name.

The defending champions are the Notre Dame Fighting Irish, who moved to the Atlantic Coast Conference.

== Changes from 2012 ==
- Butler, Creighton and Xavier were invited by the "Catholic 7" to become founding members of the new Big East.
- The FBS schools from the original Big East, along with several new members, are operating as the American Athletic Conference.

== Teams ==
=== Stadia and locations ===
Team	Location	Stadium	Capacity
Butler Bulldogs	Indianapolis, Indiana	Butler Bowl	7,500
Creighton Bluejays	Omaha, Nebraska	Morrison Stadium	6,000
DePaul Blue Demons	Chicago, Illinois	Cacciatore Stadium	1,200
Georgetown Hoyas	Washington, D.C.	Shaw Field	2,000
Marquette Golden Eagles	Milwaukee, Wisconsin	Valley Fields	1,600
Providence Friars	Providence, Rhode Island	Glay Field	3,000
St. John's Red Storm	Jamaica, New York	Belson Stadium	2,168
Seton Hall Pirates	South Orange, New Jersey	Owen T. Carroll Field	1,800
Villanova Wildcats	Villanova, Pennsylvania	Villanova Soccer Complex	1,000
Xavier Musketeers	Cincinnati, Ohio	XU Soccer Complex	1,500

== Standings ==
2013 Big East Conference men's soccer standings
	Conf.					Overall
Team	W		L		T	W		L		T
No. 10 Georgetown +	6	–	2	–	1	14	–	5	–	2
No. 12 Marquette ‡	6	–	2	–	1	13	–	6	–	2
Providence +	6	–	3	–	0	12	–	5	–	4
Xavier	6	–	3	–	0	10	–	7	–	2
Creighton +	4	–	4	–	1	9	–	9	–	2
Butler	4	–	5	–	0	11	–	8	–	1
St. John's +	3	–	4	–	2	11	–	6	–	2
Villanova	3	–	6	–	0	8	–	9	–	1
Seton Hall	3	–	6	–	0	7	–	9	–	2
DePaul	1	–	7	–	1	5	–	11	–	2
‡ - Tournament champion + - Invited to the NCAA Division I Men's Soccer Championship; As of December 17, 2013; Rankings from NSCAA

== Results ==
Home/Away	BUT	CRE	DPU	GEO	MAQ	PRO	STJ	SET	VIL	XU
Butler Bulldogs	—	2-3	2-0	1-4	2-3	2-3	0-1	2-0	2-1	2-1
Creighton Bluejays	3-2	—	5-1	0-0	0-1	1-2	1-0	2-3	0-1	2-0
DePaul Blue Demons	0-2	1-5	—	0-6	2-1	0-1	2-2 2OT	1-3	0-1	0-3
Georgetown Hoyas	4-1	0-0	6-0	—	1-0	1-0	0-1	8-0	1-0	1-2
Marquette Golden Eagles	3-2 2OT	1-0	1-2	0-1 OT	—	1-0	0-0 2OT	2-1	1-0 OT	1-0
Providence Friars	3-2	2-1	1-0	0-1	0-1	—	1-0			
St. John's Red Storm	1-0	0-1	2-2 2OT	1-0	0-0	0-1	—			
Seton Hall Pirates	0-2	3-2	3-1	0-8	1-2			—		
Villanova Wildcats	1-2	1-0	1-0	0-1	0-1				—	
Xavier Musketeers	1-2	0-2	3-0	2-1	0-1					—
