= 2013 Northeast Conference men's soccer season =

Northeast Conference
- Season: 2013
- Champions: Central Connecticut
- NEC tournament Champions: St. Francis Brooklyn
- NCAA tournament: St. Francis Brooklyn
- Matches: 28
- Goals: 67 (2.39 per match)
- Top goalscorer: Neco Brett, RMU (4 goals)
- Average attendance: 228

The 2013 Northeast Conference men's soccer season was the 33rd season of men's varsity soccer in the conference.

The Quinnipiac Bobcats are the defending regular season champions, while the Fairleigh Dickinson Knights are the defending tournament champions. Quinnipiac will be unable to defend their NEC regular season title, since they are moving to the Metro Atlantic Athletic Conference for 2013.

Central Connecticut won the Regular Season Championship by going 6-1-0 in conference play and will host the NEC tournament in New Britain, Connecticut. St. Francis Brooklyn won the 2013 NEC tournament Championship with the 4th seed by beating Central Connecticut (2-0) then Bryant (3-2).

== Changes from 2012 ==
- Qunnipiac and Monmouth are leaving the conference and joining the MAAC.
- Mount St. Mary's is dropping its men's soccer program.

== Teams ==
=== Stadia and locations ===
Team	Location	Stadium	Capacity
Bryant Bulldogs	Smithfield, Rhode Island	Bulldog Stadium	5,500
Central Connecticut Blue Devils	New Britain, Connecticut	CCSU Soccer Field	550
Fairleigh Dickinson Knights	Florham Park, New Jersey	University Stadium	500
LIU Brooklyn Blackbirds	Brooklyn, New York	LIU Field	400
Robert Morris Colonials	Moon Township, Pennsylvania	North Athletic Complex	800
Sacred Heart Pioneers	Fairfield, Connecticut	Campus Field	3,334
St. Francis Terriers	Brooklyn, New York	Brooklyn Bridge Park, Pier 5	300
Saint Francis Red Flash	Loretto, Pennsylvania	Stokes Soccerplex	500

== Standings ==
2013 Northeast Conference men's soccer standings
	Conf.					Overall
Team	W		L		T	W		L		T
Central Connecticut	6	–	1	–	0	9	–	9	–	1
Saint Francis (PA)	4	–	2	–	1	11	–	4	–	4
Bryant	4	–	2	–	1	7	–	9	–	2
St. Francis Brooklyn ‡	4	–	3	–	0	12	–	6	–	1
Fairleigh Dickinson	2	–	4	–	1	9	–	8	–	1
LIU Brooklyn	2	–	4	–	1	5	–	10	–	2
Robert Morris	2	–	5	–	0	8	–	8	–	2
Sacred Heart	2	–	5	–	0	5	–	13	–	0
‡ - Tournament champion + - Invited to the NCAA Division I Men's Soccer Championship; As of November 21, 2013; Rankings from NSCAA

== Results ==
Team/opponent	BRY	CCS	FDU	LIU	RMU	SHU	SFBK	SFU
Bryant Bulldogs		4-1	1-0	1-1 (2OT)	1-0	1-0	0-1	0-1
Central Connecticut Blue Devils	1-4		1-0	2-0	2-1	4-3 (OT)	1-0	1-0
Fairleigh Dickinson Knights	0-1	0-1		1-0	1-2	0-2	2-1	1-1 (2OT)
LIU Brooklyn Blackbirds	1-1 (2OT)	0-2	0-1		2-1	0-1	0-4	1-0
Robert Morris Colonials	0-1	1-2	2-1	1-2		5-0	2-3 (OT)	1-4
Sacred Heart Pioneers	0-1	3-4 (OT)	2-0	1-0	0-5		0-1	1-2
St. Francis Terriers	1-0	0-1	1-2	4-0	3-2 (OT)	1-0		0-1 (2OT)
Saint Francis Red Flash	1-0	0-1	1-1 (2OT)	0-1	4-1	2-1	1-0 (2OT)	

== Honors ==
- Player of the Year: Neco Brett (Robert Morris)
- Defensive Player of the Year: Nicholas Walker (Fairleigh Dickinson)
- Rookie of the Year: Conor Qualter (Central Connecticut)
- Coach of the Year: Shaun Green (Central Connecticut)

2013 NEC First Team All-Conference

Player	School	Position	Class	Hometown (Previous school)
Neco Brett	Robert Morris	Forward	Sophomore	Kingston, Jamaica (Excelsior)
Kevin Correa	St. Francis Brooklyn	Forward	Junior	Flushing, New York (Flushing)
Nick Kolarac	Saint Francis (PA)	Forward	Senior	Pittsburgh, Pennsylvania (West Allegheny)
Miro Cabrillo	Robert Morris	Midfielder	Senior	Hamilton, Ontario (Glendale Secondary School)
Bruce Cullen	Robert Morris	Midfielder	Sophomore	Pickering, Ontario (Pine Ridge)
Anders Vest-Hansen	Fairleigh Dickinson	Midfielder	Junior	Nykobing, Denmark (Celf)
John Johansson	St. Francis Brooklyn	Midfield	Senior	Kalmar, Sweden (Stagneliusskolan)
Conor Qualter	Central Connecticut	Defender	Freshman	York, England (Leeds United)
Francis DeVries	Saint Francis (PA)	Defender	Freshman	Christchurch, New Zealand (Cashmere)
Nick Walker	Fairleigh Dickinson	Defender	Senior	Port-of-Spain, Trinidad and Tobago (St. Mary's)
Daniel Valcicak	Saint Francis (PA)	Goalkeeper	Senior	Herndon, Virginia (Gonzaga College)

== Postseason ==
=== NEC tournament ===
Semifinals; Friday, November 15
1	Central Connecticut	0
4	St. Francis Brooklyn	2
2	Saint Francis (PA)	2
3	Bryant	2 (2OT)

Final; Sunday, November 17
3	Bryant	2
4	St. Francis Brooklyn	3 (2OT)

- Note-Bryant advanced to the Championship Game via Penalty Kicks (3-0)

=== NCAA tournament ===
Seed	Region	School	1st round	2nd round	3rd round	Quarterfinals	Semifinals	Championship
	4	St. Francis Brooklyn	L, 0–1 vs. Penn State					
