= 2013 Conference USA men's soccer tournament =

2013 C-USA men's soccer tournament

Tournament details
- Country: United States
- Dates: 13–17 November 2013
- Teams: 7

Final positions
- Champions: Charlotte (1st title)
- Runners-up: Tulsa

Tournament statistics
- Matches played: 6
- Goals scored: 13 (2.17 per match)
- Top goal scorer: Giuseppe Gentile (2 goals)

The 2013 Conference USA men's soccer tournament was the nineteenth edition of the Conference USA Men's Soccer Tournament. The tournament decided the Conference USA champion and guaranteed representative into the 2013 NCAA Division I Men's Soccer Championship. The tournament was hosted by the University of North Carolina at Charlotte and the games were played at Transamerica Field.

== Bracket ==
Quarterfinals; Wednesday Nov. 13
4	South Carolina	1
5	Tulsa	3
2	Old Dominion	0
7	Kentucky	1^{OT}
3	UAB	1
6	Charlotte	2

Semifinals; Friday Nov. 15
1	New Mexico	0
5	Tulsa	3
7	Kentucky	0
6	Charlotte	1

Final; Sunday Nov. 17
5	Tulsa	0
6	Charlotte	1

== Schedule ==
=== Quarterfinals ===
November 13 Match 1	South Carolina	1–3	Tulsa	Charlotte, North Carolina
3:00 PM EST (UTC-05)	Rafferty 9'	Report	South Carolina 49' (o.g.); Matamoros 54'; Barrett 89'	Stadium: Transamerica Field; Referee: Chris Penso

November 13 Match 2	Old Dominion	0–1 (a.e.t.)	Kentucky	Charlotte, North Carolina
5:30 PM EST (UTC-05)		Report	Laird 93'	Stadium: Transamerica Field; Referee: Landis Wiley

November 13 Match 3	UAB	1–2	Charlotte	Charlotte, North Carolina
8:00 PM EST (UTC-05)	Charlotte 48' (o.g.)	Report	Gentile 21', 37'	Stadium: Transamerica Field; Attendance: 558; Referee: Ted Unkel

=== Semifinals ===
November 15 Match 4	New Mexico	0–3	Tulsa	Charlotte, North Carolina
5:00 PM EST (UTC-05)		Report	Duncan 23'; Rocha 25'; Mata 50'	Stadium: Transamerica Field; Referee: Tim Debysingh

November 15 Match 5	Kentucky	0–1	Charlotte	Charlotte, North Carolina
7:30 PM EST (UTC-05)		Report	Bronico 40'	Stadium: Transamerica Field; Attendance: 1,168; Referee: Corey Rockwell

=== Final ===
November 17 Match 6	Tulsa	0–1	Charlotte	Charlotte, North Carolina
1:30 PM EST (UTC-05)		Report	Gibson 88' (pen.)	Stadium: Transamerica Field; Attendance: 1,436; Referee: Landis Riley

== Statistics ==
=== Goalscorers ===
Rank	Player	Team	Goals
1	Giuseppe Gentile	Charlotte	2
2	Brandt Bronico	Charlotte	1
2	Tyler Gibson	Charlotte	1
2	Justin Laird	Kentucky	1
2	J.P. Rafferty	South Carolina	1
2	Akeil Barrett	Tulsa	1
2	Quinton Duncan	Tulsa	1
2	Omar Mata	Tulsa	1
2	Abe Matamoros	Tulsa	1
2	Tony Rocha	Tulsa	1

Own goal

- (South Carolina scored for Tulsa)
- (Charlotte scored for UAB)

== Awards ==
=== All-Tournament team ===
- Giuseppe Gentile, Charlotte (Offensive MVP)
- Thomas Allen, Charlotte (Defensive MVP)
- Brandt Bronico, Charlotte
- Tyler Gibson, Charlotte
- Callum Irving, Kentucky
- Charlie Reymann, Kentucky
- Jordan Wilson, Kentucky
- Tim Hopkinson, Old Dominion
- Akeil Barrett, Tulsa
- Jake McGuire, Tulsa
- Tony Rocha, Tulsa
