= 2020 Atlantic 10 Conference men's soccer season =

- League: NCAA Division I
- Sport: Soccer
- Duration: February 3 – April 11, 2021
- Teams: 13

2021 MLS SuperDraft
- Top draft pick: Jonas Fjeldberg, 54th overall
- Picked by: FC Cincinnati

Regular Season
- Season champions: Dayton
- Runners-up: Saint Louis
- Season MVP: Off.: Jonas Fjeldberg; Def.: Jørgen Oland; Mid.: Kingsford Adjei

Tournament
- Champions: Fordham
- Runners-up: George Washington
- Finals MVP: Matt Sloan

Atlantic 10 Conference men's soccer seasons
- ← 2019 2021 →

2020 Atlantic 10 Conference men's soccer standings
	Conf.					Overall
Team	W		L		T	W		L		T
Central
George Washington	3	–	1	–	2	5	–	3	–	2
VCU	3	–	2	–	1	4	–	3	–	2
Davidson	2	–	2	–	2	3	–	4	–	2
George Mason	0	–	3	–	3	0	–	6	–	3
North
No. 22 Fordham ‡	3	–	0	–	2	7	–	1	–	2
UMass +	3	–	1	–	2	7	–	2	–	2
La Salle	2	–	3	–	1	5	–	5	–	1
Rhode Island	1	–	3	–	1	2	–	4	–	1
Saint Joseph's	1	–	4	–	0	3	–	7	–	0
West
Dayton	4	–	1	–	1	4	–	4	–	1
Saint Louis	4	–	2	–	0	9	–	5	–	0
Duquesne	2	–	4	–	0	2	–	5	–	0
St. Bonaventure	1	–	4	–	1	4	–	4	–	1
‡ – 2020 Atlantic 10 Tournament champion + – Also invited to the 2020 NCAA tournament; As of May 28, 2021; Rankings from United Soccer Coaches

The 2020 Atlantic 10 Conference men's soccer season was the 34th season of men's college soccer in the Atlantic 10 Conference. The season was scheduled to begin on August 29, 2020 and conclude on November 6, 2020, but was postponed due to the COVID-19 pandemic. The season is scheduled to begin on February 3, 2021 and conclude on April 11, 2021.

Rhode Island entered the season as the defending regular season and tournament champions, but failed to defend both titles. Dayton won the regular season, while Fordham won the A10 Tournament.

== Background ==
=== Previous season ===
Rhode Island won the college soccer double by winning the Atlantic 10 regular season and tournament. The Rams finished the season with a record of 14–4–3, 7–1–0 in Atlantic 10 play. In the NCAA Tournament Rhode Island lost 3–4 to UConn in the opening round.

Dayton's Jonas Fjeldberg won the Offensive Player of the Year. Fordham's Jørgen Oland won the Defensive Player of the Year. Dayton's Kingsford Adjei won the Midfielder of the Year. Rhode Island head coach, Gareth Elliott, won the Coach of the Year Award. Finally, Dayton's Toluwalase Oladeinbo won the Freshman of the Year Award. Rhode Island's Peder Kristiansen won third-team All-American honors by TopDrawer Soccer and Soccer America. VCU's Ryo Shimazaki was the first Atlantic 10 player selected in the 2020 MLS SuperDraft, drafted in the third round with the 59th pick by Columbus Crew.

=== Stadiums and locations ===
Club	City	Home Ground	Capacity
Davidson Wildcats	Davidson, North Carolina	Alumni Soccer Stadium	2,000
Dayton Flyers	Dayton, Ohio	Baujan Field	3,000
Duquesne Dukes	Pittsburgh, Pennsylvania	Rooney Field	2,200
Fordham Rams	Bronx, New York	Coffey Field	7,000
George Mason Patriots	Fairfax, Virginia	George Mason Stadium	5,000
George Washington Colonials	Washington, D.C.	Mount Vernon Athletic Field	800
La Salle Explorers	Philadelphia, Pennsylvania	McCarthy Stadium	7,500
Rhode Island Rams	Kingston, Rhode Island	URI Soccer Complex	2,000
St. Bonaventure Bonnies	Allegany, New York	Marra Athletics Complex	200
St. Joseph's Hawks	Philadelphia, Pennsylvania	Sweeney Field	3,000
Saint Louis Billikens	St. Louis, Missouri	Hermann Stadium	6,050
UMass Minutemen	Amherst, Massachusetts	Rudd Field	800
VCU Rams	Richmond, Virginia	Sports Backers Stadium	3,250

=== Coaching changes ===
Long-time George Mason head coach, Greg Andrulis, resigned at the end of the 2019 season, coaching the program for 15 seasons. Andrulis was replaced by former North Carolina and Creighton coach, Elmar Bolowich, who was hired on January 13, 2020.

School	Outgoing coach	Manner of departure	Date of vacancy	Position in table	Incoming coach	Date of appointment
George Mason	Greg Andrulis (United States)	Resigned	November 13, 2019	Preseason	Elmar Bolowich (Germany)	January 13, 2020

=== Impact of the COVID-19 pandemic on the season ===
Teams were divided into pods for the season:

- West: Dayton, Duquesne, Saint Louis, St. Bonaventure
- North: Fordham La Salle, Rhode Island, Saint Joseph's, UMass
- Central: Davidson, George Mason, George Washington, VCU

== Head coaches ==
As of December 31, 2020

Team	Head coach	Previous job	Years at school	Overall record	Record at school	Atlantic 10 record	NCAA Tournaments	NCAA College Cups	NCAA Titles	Ref.
Davidson	Mike Babst	UChicago	2	90–34–14 (.703)	3–11–2 (.250)	3–5–0 (.375)	5	0	0	
Dayton	Dennis Currier	Incarnate Word	15	340–147–55 (.678)	152–98–43 (.592)	6–2–0 (.750)	9	0	0	
Duquesne	Chase Brooks	Niagara	8	64–57–22 (.524)	42–51–13 (.458)	18–24–6 (.438)	1	0	0	
Fordham	Carlo Acquista	Adelphi	2	145–137–32 (.513)	7–10–3 (.425)	5–2–1 (.688)	9	0	0	
George Mason	Elmar Bolowich	Creighton	1	395–184–55 (.666)	0–0–0 (–)	0–0–0 (–)	21	6	0	
George Washington	Craig Jones	George Washington (asst.)	9	53–72–15 (.432)	53–72–15 (.432)	25–32–8 (.446)	0	0	0	
La Salle	Rob Irvine	Kean	4	55–59–7 (.483)	29–45–6 (.400)	12–17–3 (.422)	0	0	0	
UMass	Fran O'Leary	Bowdoin	5	275–179–56 (.594)	41–44–10 (.484)	20–16–4 (.550)	7	2	0	
Rhode Island	Gareth Elliott	Siena	8	114–93–14 (.548)	72–53–3 (.574)	31–23–2 (.571)	2	0	0	
St. Bonaventure	Kwame Oduro	Canisius (asst.)	5	26–57–6 (.326)	26–57–6 (.326)	12–27–1 (.313)	0	0	0	
Saint Joseph's	Don D'Ambra	Philadelphia Kixx	10	170–225–23 (.434)	47–109–23 (.327)	16–57–11 (.256)	0	0	0	
Saint Louis	Kevin Kalish	SIU Edwardsville	3	65–57–21 (.528)	16–11–7 (.574)	9–3–4 (.688)	0	0	0	
VCU	Dave Giffard	Akron (asst.)	10	93–72–31 (.554)	93–72–31 (.554)	51–20–12 (.687)	3	0	0	

== Preseason ==
=== Preseason poll ===
The preseason poll was announced on February 2, 2021.

	Team ranking	Points (First)
1.	Saint Louis	145
2.	Dayton	143
2.	VCU	143
4.	Rhode Island	135
5.	Fordham	115
6.	George Mason	86
7.	Davidson	76
8.	La Salle	75
8.	UMass	75
10.	Duquesne	63
11.	George Washington	60
12.	Saint Joseph's	36
13.	St. Bonaventure	31

=== Preseason awards ===
To be announced.

=== Preseason fixtures ===
Index to colors and formatting
A10 member won	A10 member lost	A10 member tied
A10 teams in **bold**

All times Eastern time.

Date	Time (ET)	Visiting team	Home team	Site	Result	Attendance
January 26	4:00 p.m.	**VCU**	Charlotte	Transamerica Field • Charlotte, NC	Cancelled	
January 28	7:00 p.m.	Belmont Abbey	**Davidson**	Alumni Soccer Stadium • Davidson, NC	**W** 3–0	0
January 29	2:30 p.m.	**VCU**	Temple	Owls Sports Complex • Philadelphia, PA	**W** 2–1	0
January 31	2:00 p.m.	**Saint Joseph's**	Temple	Owls Sports Complex • Philadelphia, PA	**T** 1–1	0
February 2	5:00 p.m.	Charlotte	**Davidson**	Alumni Soccer Stadium • Davidson, NC	Cancelled (Note: The Davidson v Charlotte friendly was cancelled due to the January 31 – February 3, 2021 nor'easter.)	
February 6	1:00 p.m.	**Fordham**	UConn	Morrone Stadium • Storrs, CT	**T** 0–0	0
February 10	2:00 p.m.	**Saint Joseph's**	Villanova	Campolo Field • Philadelphia, PA	Cancelled	
February 12	2:00 p.m.	**Dayton**	Akron	FirstEnergy Stadium • Akron, OH	**W** 2–1	0

== Regular season ==
Index to colors and formatting
A10 member won	A10 member lost	A10 member tied
A10 teams in **bold**

All times Eastern time.

=== Week 1 (Feb. 3 – Feb. 7) ===
Date	Time (ET)	Visiting team	Home team	Site	Result	Attendance
February 3	5:00 p.m.	**VCU**	Marshall	Veterans Soccer Complex • Huntington, WV	Postponed (Note: The Marshall v VCU match was postponed due to COVID-19 protocols within the Marshall program.)	
February 3	6:00 p.m.	Kansas City	**Saint Louis**	Hermann Stadium • St. Louis, MO	**W** 3–0	50
February 6	2:00 p.m.	Old Dominion	**VCU**	Sports Backers Stadium • Richmond, VA	Postponed (Note: The VCU v Old Dominion match was postponed due to COVID-19 protocols within the Old Dominion program.)	
February 7	12:00 p.m.	Mercer	**Davidson**	Alumni Soccer Stadium • Davidson, NC	Postponed (Note: The Davidson v Mercer match was postponed due to COVID-19 protocols within the Mercer program.)	
February 7	3:45 p.m.	McKendree	**Saint Louis**	Hermann Stadium • St. Louis, MO	**W** 2–1	0

=== Week 2 (Feb. 8 – Feb. 14) ===
Date	Time (ET)	Visiting team	Home team	Site	Result	Attendance
February 10	2:00 p.m.	Sacred Heart	**UMass**	Rudd Field • Amherst, MA	Cancelled (Note: UMass' matches against Sacred Heart and Northeastern were cancelled due to a pause in athletic events due to COVID-19 from February 7–21, 2021.)	
February 10	7:00 p.m.	Liberty	**Davidson**	Alumni Soccer Stadium • Davidson, NC	**L** 0–1	0
February 10	7:00 p.m.	Georgetown	**VCU**	Sports Backers Stadium • Richmond, VA	**T** 1–1	0
February 13	4:00 p.m.	**Saint Louis**	Marquette	Valley Fields • Milwaukee, WI	**L** 0–1	0
February 13	5:00 p.m.	Fairleigh Dickinson	**Fordham**	Jack Coffey Field • The Bronx, NY	**W** 2–0	0
February 13	6:00 p.m.	**VCU**	UNCW	UNCW Soccer Stadium • Wilmington, NC	Postponed (Note: The UNCW v VCU match was postponed due to the February 11–14, 2021 North American storm complex.)	
February 14	6:00 p.m.	**Davidson**	UNCG	UNCG Soccer Stadium • Greensboro, NC	Postponed (Note: The UNCG v Davidson match was postponed due to COVID-19 protocols within the UNCG program.)	

=== Week 3 (Feb. 15 – Feb. 21) ===
Date	Time (ET)	Visiting team	Home team	Site	Result	Attendance
February 15	5:00 p.m.	**Saint Joseph's**	St. John's	Belson Stadium • New York City, NY	**L** 0–1	0
February 17	6:00 p.m.	**VCU**	Longwood	Longwood Athletics Complex • Farmville, VA	Postponed (Note: The VCU v Longwood match was postponed due to COVID-19 protocols within the Longwood program.)	
February 17	7:00 p.m.	SIU Edwardsville	**Saint Louis**	Hermann Stadium • St. Louis, MO	Postponed (Note: The Saint Louis v SIUE match was postponed due to inclement weather caused by the February 13–17, 2021 North American winter storm.)	
February 17	TBA	**Fordham**	St. John's	Belson Stadium • Queens, NY	Postponed	
February 18	7:00 p.m.	Presbyterian	**Davidson**	Alumni Soccer Stadium • Davidson, NC	Postponed (Note: The Davidson v Presbyterian was postponed due to COVID-19 protocols.)	
February 19	5:00 p.m.	Virginia Tech	**VCU**	Sports Backers Stadium • Richmond, VA	Canceled (Note: The VCU v Virginia Tech match was cancelled due to COVID-19 protocols within the Virginia Tech program.)	
February 19	6:00 p.m.	Bowling Green	**Dayton**	Wall2Wall Indoor Soccer Field • Mason, OH	**L** 2–3	5
February 20	1:00 p.m.	Stony Brook	**Fordham**	Jack Coffey Field • The Bronx, NY	Postponed	
February 20	2:00 p.m.	**George Mason**	Old Dominion	ODU Soccer Complex • Norfolk, VA	Cancelled (Note: The George Mason v Old Dominion match was cancelled due to COVID-19 protocols within the Old Dominion program.)	
February 21	1:00 p.m.	**Saint Louis**	Butler	Sellick Bowl • Indianapolis, IN	**W** 2–0	108

=== Week 4 (Feb. 22 – Feb. 28) ===
Date	Time (ET)	Visiting team	Home team	Site	Result	Attendance
February 24	6:00 p.m.	**UMass**	Northeastern	Parsons Field • Boston, MA	**W** 2–0	0
February 24	6:00 p.m.	NC State	**VCU**	Sports Backers Stadium • Richmond, VA	**L** 0–1	103
February 24	7:00 p.m.	**Fordham**	Seton Hall	Owen T. Carroll Field • South Orange, NJ	Postponed	
February 25	7:00 p.m.	**Davidson**	High Point	Vert Stadium • High Point, NC	Postponed	
February 26	TBA	**Saint Louis**	Xavier	Grand Park • Indianapolis, IN	**W** 3–1	270
February 27	2:00 p.m.	James Madison	**George Mason**	George Mason Stadium • Fairfax, VA	**L** 0–3	147
February 27	7:00 p.m.	Cedarville	**Dayton**	Baujan Field • Dayton, OH	**W** 6–2	25
February 27	7:00 p.m.	**Duquesne**	No. 1 Pitt	Ambrose Urbanic Field • Pittsburgh, PA	**L** 0–1	0
February 27	7:00 p.m.	Drexel	**Saint Joseph's**	Sweeney Field • Philadelphia, PA	**W** 2–0	0
February 27	7:00 p.m.	**VCU**	ETSU	Summers-Taylor Stadium • Johnson City, TN	**T** 0–0 ^{2OT}	201
February 27	TBA	**UMass**	Vermont	Virtue Field • Burlington, VT	Canceled	
February 28	TBA	**Davidson**	Wake Forest	Spry Stadium • Winston-Salem, NC	**L** 0–1	0

=== Week 5 (Mar. 1 – Mar. 7) ===
Date	Time (ET)	Visiting team	Home team	Site	Result	Attendance
March 2	1:00 p.m.	**George Mason**	Virginia	Klöckner Stadium • Charlottesville, VA	**L** 0–3	37
March 2	6:00 p.m.	Columbia (MO)	No. 17 **Saint Louis**	Grand Park • Indianapolis, IN	**L** 0–1	0
March 3	5:30 p.m.	Hofstra	**UMass**	Rudd Field • Amherst, MA	**W** 2–0	0
March 3	6:00 p.m.	**VCU**	Coastal Carolina	CCU Soccer Field • Conway, SC	Canceled	
March 3	7:00 p.m.	**Saint Joseph's**	Drexel	Vidas Field • Philadelphia, PA	**L** 0–4	0
March 6	2:00 p.m.	**Fordham**	Hofstra	Hofstra Soccer Stadium • Hempstead, NY	Postponed	
March 6	2:00 p.m.	William & Mary	**George Mason**	George Mason Stadium • Fairfax, VA	**L** 1–2 ^{OT}	145
March 6	6:00 p.m.	Wofford	**Davidson**	Alumni Soccer Stadium • Davidson, NC	**W** 3–2	0
March 7	4:00 p.m.	Albany	**UMass**	Rudd Field • Amherst, MA	**W** 3–0	0
March 7	6:00 p.m.	Lipscomb	No. 17 **Saint Louis**	Hermann Stadium • St. Louis, MO	**W** 2–0	0
March 7	6:00 p.m.	**VCU**	Elon	Rudd Field • Elon, NC	**W** 3–2	33

=== Week 6 (Mar. 8 – Mar. 14) ===
Date	Time (ET)	Visiting team	Home team	Site	Result	Attendance
March 10	7:00 p.m.	Bellarmine	Dayton	Baujan Field • Dayton, OH		
March 10	7:00 p.m.	Delaware	Saint Joseph's	Sweeney Field • Philadelphia, PA		
March 13	4:00 p.m.	**Fordham**	UMass	Rudd Field • Amherst, MA		
March 13	6:00 p.m.	**Dayton**	Saint Louis	Hermann Stadium • St. Louis, MO		
March 13	7:00 p.m.	**George Washington**	VCU	Sports Backers Stadium • Richmond, VA		
March 13	TBA	**Duquesne**	St. Bonaventure	Marra Athletics Complex • Olean, NY		
March 13	TBA	**Rhode Island**	La Salle	McCarthy Stadium • Philadelphia, PA		
March 14	11:00 a.m.	**George Mason**	Davidson	Alumni Soccer Stadium • Davidson, NC		

=== Week 7 (Mar. 15 – Mar. 21) ===
Date	Time (ET)	Visiting team	Home team	Site	Result	Attendance
March 16	7:00 p.m.	**Fordham**	Saint Joseph's	Sweeney Field • Philadelphia, PA		
March 17	4:00 p.m.	**Saint Louis**	St. Bonaventure	Marra Athletics Complex • Olean, NY		
March 17	7:00 p.m.	**VCU**	Davidson	Alumni Soccer Stadium • Davidson, NC		
March 17	7:00 p.m.	**George Washington**	George Mason	George Mason Stadium • Fairfax, VA		
March 17	7:00 p.m.	**La Salle**	UMass	Rudd Field • Amherst, MA		
March 17	TBA	**Dayton**	Duquesne	Rooney Field • Pittsburgh, PA		
March 20	2:00 p.m.	**George Mason**	VCU	Sports Backers Stadium • Richmond, VA		
March 20	6:00 p.m.	Saint Francis (PA)	Fordham	Jack Coffey Field • The Bronx, NY		
March 20	7:00 p.m.	**St. Bonaventure**	Dayton	Baujan Field • Dayton, OH		
March 20	TBA	**Saint Louis**	Duquesne	Rooney Field • Pittsburgh, PA		
March 20	TBA	**Davidson**	George Washington	Mount Vernon Athletic Field • Washington, DC		
March 20	TBA	**UMass**	Rhode Island	URI Soccer Complex • Kingston, RI		
March 21	7:00 p.m.	**Saint Joseph's**	La Salle	McCarthy Stadium • Philadelphia, PA		

=== Week 8 (Mar. 22 – Mar. 28) ===
Date	Time (ET)	Visiting team	Home team	Site	Result	Attendance
March 27	1:00 p.m.	VCU	George Washington	Mount Vernon Athletic Field • Washington, DC		
March 27	3:00 p.m.	Rhode Island	Fordham	Jack Coffey Field • The Bronx, NY		
March 27	5:00 p.m.	UMass	Saint Joseph's	Sweeney Field • Philadelphia, PA		
March 27	TBA	St. Bonaventure	Duquesne	Rooney Field • Pittsburgh, PA		
March 27	TBA	Davidson	George Mason	George Mason Stadium • Fairfax, VA		
March 28	TBA	Saint Louis	Dayton	Baujan Field • Dayton, OH		

=== Week 9 (Mar. 29 – Apr. 4) ===
Date	Time (ET)	Visiting team	Home team	Site	Result	Attendance
March 30	7:00 p.m.	Fordham	**La Salle**	McCarthy Stadium • Philadelphia, PA		
March 31	5:00 p.m.	Saint Joseph's	**Rhode Island**	URI Soccer Complex • Kingston, RI		
April 3	1:00 p.n.	George Mason	**George Washington**	Mount Vernon Athletic Field • Washington, DC		
April 3	6:00 p.m.	St. Bonaventure	**Saint Louis**	Hermann Stadium • St. Louis, MO		
April 3	7:00 p.m.	UMass	**Fordham**	Jack Coffey Field • The Bronx, NY		
April 3	7:00 p.m.	Saint Joseph's	Delaware	Grant Stadium • Newark, DE		
April 3	7:00 p.m.	Davidson	**VCU**	Sports Backers Stadium • Richmond, VA		
April 3	TBA	Duquesne	**Dayton**	Baujan Field • Dayton, OH		
April 3	TBA	La Salle	**Rhode Island**	URI Soccer Complex • Kingston, RI		

=== Week 10 (Apr. 5 – Apr. 11) ===
Date	Time (ET)	Visiting team	Home team	Site	Result	Attendance
April 6	7:00 p.m.	Fordham	NJIT	J. Malcolm Simon Stadium • Newark, NJ		
April 7	7:00 p.m.	La Salle	**Saint Joseph's**	Sweeney Field • Philadelphia, PA		
April 10	2:00 p.m.	VCU	**George Mason**	George Mason Stadium • Fairfax, VA		
April 10	4:00 p.m.	George Washington	**Davidson**	Alumni Soccer Stadium • Davidson, NC		
April 10	6:00 p.m.	Duquesne	**Saint Louis**	Hermann Stadium • St. Louis, MO		
April 10	TBA	Dayton	**St. Bonaventure**	Marra Athletics Complex • Olean, NY		
April 10	TBA	Rhode Island	**UMass**	Rudd Field • Amherst, MA		
April 11	5:00 p.m.	Saint Joseph's	**Fordham**	Jack Coffey Field • The Bronx, NY		

== Postseason ==
=== A-10 Tournament ===
Due to the COVID-19 pandemic, the Atlantic 10 Tournament only had four teams participate.

Semifinals; April 15
1	Dayton	0
4	George Washington	1
2	Saint Louis	1
3	Fordham	2

Final; April 17
4	George Washington	0
3	Fordham	2

=== NCAA Tournament ===
The NCAA Tournament was reduced from 48 to 36 teams due to the pandemic.

Seed	School	1st Round	2nd Round	3rd Round	Quarterfinals	Semifinals	Championship
—N/a	Fordham	BYE	L 1–2 (OT) vs. Marshall – (Wilson, NC)				
—N/a	UMass	BYE	L 1–4 vs. Penn State – (Greensboro, NC)				
	W–L (%):	0–0–0 (–)	0–2–0 (.000)	0–0–0 (–)	0–0–0 (–)	0–0–0 (–)	0–0–0 (–) Total: 0–2–0 (.000)

== Rankings ==
=== National ===
	Improvement in ranking
	Drop in ranking
RV	Received votes but were not ranked in Top 25
NV	No votes received

		Pre	Wk 1	Wk 2	Wk 3	Wk 4	Wk 5	Wk 6	Wk 7	Wk 8	Wk 9	Wk 10	Wk 11	Wk 12	Wk 13	Wk 14	Final
Davidson	USC	—	None released				NV	NV	NV	NV	NV	NV					
Davidson	TDS	—	NV	NV	NV	NV	NV	NV	NV	NV	NV	NV	NV				
Dayton	USC	—	None released				NV	NV	NV	NV	NV	NV					
Dayton	TDS	—	NV	NV	NV	NV	NV	NV	NV	NV	NV	NV	NV				
Duquesne	USC	—	None released				NV	NV	NV	NV	NV	NV					
Duquesne	TDS	—	NV	NV	NV	NV	NV	NV	NV	NV	NV	NV	NV				
Fordham	USC	—	None released				NV	NV	NV	NV	NV	NV					
Fordham	TDS	—	NV	NV	NV	NV	NV	NV	NV	NV	NV	NV	NV				
George Mason	USC	—	None released				NV	NV	NV	NV	NV	NV					
George Mason	TDS	—	NV	NV	NV	NV	NV	NV	NV	NV	NV	NV	NV				
George Washington	USC	—	None released				NV	NV	NV	NV	NV	NV					
George Washington	TDS	—	NV	NV	NV	NV	NV	NV	NV	NV	NV	NV	NV				
La Salle	USC	—	None released				NV	NV	NV	NV	NV	NV					
La Salle	TDS	—	NV	NV	NV	NV	NV	NV	NV	NV	NV	NV	NV				
Rhode Island	USC	—	None released				NV	NV	NV	NV	NV	NV					
Rhode Island	TDS	—	NV	NV	NV	NV	NV	NV	NV	NV	NV	NV	NV				
St. Bonaventure	USC	—	None released				NV	NV	NV	NV	NV	NV					
St. Bonaventure	TDS	—	NV	NV	NV	NV	NV	NV	NV	NV	NV	NV	NV				
Saint Joseph's	USC	—	None released				NV	NV	NV	NV	NV	NV					
Saint Joseph's	TDS	—	NV	NV	NV	NV	NV	NV	NV	NV	NV	NV	NV				
Saint Louis	USC	—	None released				17	RV	RV	NV	NV	NV					
Saint Louis	TDS	—	NV	NV	NV	NV	18	NV	NV	NV	NV	NV	NV				
UMass	USC	—	None released				NV	NV	NV	NV	NV	NV					
UMass	TDS	—	NV	NV	NV	NV	NV	NV	NV	NV	NV	NV	NV				
VCU	USC	—	None released				NV	NV	NV	NV	NV	NV					
VCU	TDS	—	NV	NV	NV	NV	NV	NV	NV	NV	NV	NV	NV				

=== Regional – Southeast Regional ===
	Improvement in ranking
	Drop in ranking
RV	Received votes but were not ranked in Top 10
NV	No votes received

The United Soccer Coaches' Southeast Regional compared Atlantic 10 teams to teams in the Sun Belt Conference and Conference USA.

	Wk 1	Wk 2	Wk 3	Wk 4	Wk 5	Wk 6	Wk 7	Wk 8
Davidson	NV	NV	NV	NV	NV	NV	NV	
Dayton	NV	NV	NV	NV	NV	NV	9	
Duquesne	NV	NV	NV	NV	NV	NV	NV	
Fordham	10	NV	NV	NV	6	6	6	
George Mason	NV	NV	NV	NV	NV	NV	NV	
George Washington	NV	NV	NV	NV	NV	NV	NV	
La Salle	NV	NV	NV	10	NV	NV	NV	
Rhode Island	NV	NV	NV	NV	NV	NV	NV	
St. Bonaventure	NV	NV	NV	NV	NV	NV	NV	
Saint Joseph's	NV	NV	NV	NV	NV	NV	NV	
Saint Louis	3	4	5	7	10	10	8	
UMass	NV	6	7	6	8	8	NV	
VCU	NV	8	9	9	NV	NV	NV	

== 2021 MLS Draft ==
The 2021 MLS SuperDraft was held on January 21, 2021. One player from the conference was drafted.

=== Total picks by school ===
Team	Round 1	Round 2	Round 3	Round 4	Total
Davidson	0	0	0	0	0
Dayton	0	1	0	0	1
Duquesne	0	0	0	0	0
Fordham	0	0	0	0	0
George Mason	0	0	0	0	0
George Washington	0	0	0	0	0
La Salle	0	0	0	0	0
UMass	0	0	0	0	0
Rhode Island	0	0	0	0	0
St. Bonaventure	0	0	0	0	0
Saint Joseph's	0	0	0	0	0
Saint Louis	0	0	0	0	0
VCU	0	0	0	0	0

=== List of selections ===
Rnd.	Pick	Player	Pos.	Team	School	Ref.
2	54	Jonas Fjeldberg	MF	FC Cincinnati	Dayton (Sr.)	

== Awards ==
=== Player of the Week ===
Week	Offensive			Defensive			Rookie			Ref.
Week	Player	Position	Team	Player	Position	Team	Player	Position	Team	Ref.
Feb. 16	Omari Cotterell	Forward	La Salle	Brett Warner	Goalkeeper	La Salle	Mason Leeth	Midfielder	Saint Louis	
Feb. 22	Luca Nicastro	Midfielder	St. Bonaventure	Justin Grady	Goalkeeper	George Washington	Tim Neumann	Midfielder	George Washington	
Mar. 1	Simon Becher	Forward	Saint Louis	Patrick Schulte	Goalkeeper	Saint Louis	Junior Nare	Midfielder	La Salle	
Mar. 8	Celio Pompeu	Midfielder	VCU	Marvyn Dorchin	Goalkeeper	UMass	Junior Nare	Forward	La Salle	
Mar. 16	Kent Harrison	Forward	George Mason	Patrick Schulte	Goalkeeper	Saint Louis	Adam Luckhurst	Forward	Davidson	
Mar. 22	Alec Hughes	Defender	UMass	Justin Grady	Goalkeeper	George Washington	Maxi Hopfer	Midfielder	Duquesne	
Mar. 29	Luke McNamara	Midfielder	Fordham	Giacomo Piccardo	Goalkeeper	Davidson	Alec Hughes	Defender	UMass	
Apr. 5	Jonas Fjeldberg	Forward	Dayton	Josh Levin	Goalkeeper	Fordham	Nemo Philipp	Midfielder	Saint Joseph's	
Apr. 12	Ethan Manheim	Midfielder	VCU	Josh Levin	Goalkeeper	Fordham	Alec Hughes	Defender	UMass	

=== Player of the Year ===
2020 Atlantic 10 Men's Soccer Individual Awards
Award	Recipient(s)
Offensive Player of the Year	Jonas Fjeldberg – Dayton
Defensive Player of the Year	Patrick Schulte – Saint Louis
Midfielder of the Year	Kingsford Adjei – Dayton
Coach of the Year	Dennis Currier – Dayton
Freshman of the Year	Alec Hughes – UMass

2020 Atlantic 10 Men's Soccer All-Conference Teams
First Team Honorees	Second Team Honorees	All-Freshman Team Honorees	Academic Award Honorees
Jonas Fjeldberg, Dayton; Alec Hughes, Massachusetts; Oscar Haynes Brown, George Washington; Simon Becher, Saint Louis; Kingsford Adjei, Dayton; Yosuke Hanya, Massachusetts; Christian Buendia, Saint Louis; Luke McNamara, Fordham; Graham Brenner, Massachusetts; Mujeeb Murana, Saint Louis; Patrick Schulte, Saint Louis	Lucas Hauth, Davidson; Toluwalase Oladeinbo, Dayton; Omari Cotterell, La Salle; John Klein, Saint Louis; Ben Shepherd, Massachusetts; Mason Leeth, Saint Louis; Celio Pompeu, VCU; Elias Harryson, Dayton; Kipp Keller, Saint Louis; Ulrik Edvarsen, VCU; Justin Grady, George Washington	Trey Gardiner, Davidson; Adam Luckhurst, Davidson; Marc Kouadio, Dayton; Maxi Hopfer, Duquesne; Scott Beeks, La Salle; Junior Nare, La Salle; Alec Hughes, Massachusetts; Kevin Castaneda, Rhode Island; Christian Buendia, Saint Louis; Mason Leeth, Saint Louis; Jonathan Kanagwa, VCU	Lucas Hauth, Davidson; Jacob Bohm, Fordham; Tom Cooklin, George Washington; Sandro Weber, George Washington; Hugo Guerra, Rhode Island; Shea Currey, St. Bonaventure; David Grana, Saint Joseph's; Alan Kahlenbeck, Saint Joseph's; Keaton Schieffer, Saint Louis; Toranosuke Abe, VCU; Simon Fitch, VCU

=== National honors ===
To be announced.

=== Regional honors ===
To be announced.
