= 2019 Atlantic 10 Conference men's soccer season =

- League: NCAA Division I
- Sport: Soccer
- Duration: August 30, 2019 – November 2, 2019
- Teams: 13

2020 MLS SuperDraft
- Top draft pick: Ryo Shimazaki, 59th overall
- Picked by: Columbus Crew

Regular Season
- Season champions: Rhode Island
- Runners-up: VCU
- Season MVP: Offensive: Jonas Fjeldberg; Defensive: Joergen Oland

Tournament
- Champions: Rhode Island
- Runners-up: Dayton
- Finals MVP: Ludvik Benco

Atlantic 10 Conference men's soccer seasons
- ← 2018 2020 →

2019 Atlantic 10 Conference men's soccer standings
	Conf.					Overall
Team	W		L		T	W		L		T
Rhode Island ‡	7	–	1	–	0	14	–	4	–	3
VCU	6	–	1	–	1	7	–	8	–	3
Dayton	6	–	2	–	0	13	–	8	–	0
Saint Louis	6	–	2	–	0	10	–	7	–	0
Fordham	5	–	2	–	1	7	–	10	–	3
La Salle	4	–	4	–	0	8	–	9	–	1
Duquesne	3	–	5	–	0	8	–	8	–	1
UMass	3	–	5	–	0	7	–	10	–	0
George Washington	3	–	5	–	0	5	–	11	–	1
George Mason	3	–	5	–	0	4	–	12	–	2
Davidson	3	–	5	–	0	3	–	11	–	2
Saint Joseph's	1	–	7	–	0	5	–	12	–	1
St. Bonaventure	1	–	7	–	0	5	–	11	–	0
‡ – 2019 Atlantic 10 Tournament champion + – Invited to the 2019 NCAA tournament; As of 22 November 2019; Rankings from United Soccer Coaches

The 2019 Atlantic 10 Conference men's soccer season was the 33rd season of men's college soccer in the Atlantic 10 Conference. The season began on August 30, 2019, and concluded on November 2, 2019.

The regular season and tournament was won by Rhode Island. Rhode Island bested VCU for the regular season championship and Dayton for the tournament championship. Rhode Island earned the Atlantic 10's automatic, and only, berth into the 2019 NCAA Division I Men's Soccer Tournament, where they lost in the opening round to Syracuse.

Dayton's Jonas Fjeldberg won the Atlantic 10 Offensive Player of the Year, while Joergen Oland won the Atlantic 10 Defensive Player of the Year Award. Gareth Elliott won the Atlantic 10 Coach of the Year Award.

== Background ==
=== Previous season ===
UMass entered the season as the defending regular season and tournament champions. The Minutemen finished eighth in the regular season and were eliminated in the quarterfinals of the A-10 Tournament by VCU. VCU won the regular season championship, giving the Rams their first A-10 regular season title, and their first regular season championship overall since 2004. Rhode Island won the tournament, given them their first A-10 tournament title since 2006.

Rhode Island at the A-10 Tournament champions, earned the conference's automatic berth into the NCAA Tournament. They were the only berth the A-10 sent to the NCAA Tournament. There they were defeated by their rivals, Connecticut, 3–4.

=== Coaching changes ===
Fordham head coach, Jim McElderry, resigned at the end of the 2018 season to accept the head coaching job at Rutgers University. On January 30, 2019, Fordham hired Carlo Acquista as the program's head coach.

School	Outgoing coach	Manner of departure	Date of vacancy	Position in table	Incoming coach	Date of appointment
Fordham	(United States) Jim McElderry	Hired by Rutgers	December 9, 2018	Preseason	(United States) Carlo Acquista	January 30, 2019

== Head coaches ==
As of the 2018 season

Team	Head coach	Previous job	Years at school	Overall record	Record at school	Atlantic 10 record	NCAA Tournaments	NCAA College Cups	NCAA Titles	Ref.
Davidson	Mike Babst	UChicago	1	87–23–12 (.762)	0–0–0 (–)	0–0–0 (–)	5	0	0	
Dayton	Dennis Currier	Incarnate Word	14	327–139–55 (.680)	139–90–43 (.590)	0–0–0 (–)	9	0	0	
Duquesne	Chase Brooks	Niagara	7	56–49–21 (.528)	34–43–12 (.449)	15–19–6 (.450)	1	0	0	
Fordham	Carlo Acquista	Adelphi	1	138–127–29 (.519)	0–0–0 (–)	0–0–0 (–)	9	0	0	
George Mason	Greg Andrulis	Columbus Crew	14	254–174–65 (.581)	120–102–37 (.535)	0–0–0 (–)	5	0	0	
George Washington	Craig Jones	George Washington (asst.)	8	48–61–14 (.447)	48–61–14 (.447)	22–27–8 (.456)	0	0	0	
La Salle	Rob Irvine	Kean	3	47–50–6 (.485)	21–36–5 (.379)	8–13–3 (.396)	0	0	0	
UMass	Fran O'Leary	Bowdoin	4	268–169–56 (.600)	34–34–10 (.500)	17–11–4 (.594)	7	2	0	
Rhode Island	Gareth Elliott	Siena	7	100–89–11 (.528)	58–49–0 (.542)	24–22–2 (.521)	1	0	0	
St. Bonaventure	Kwame Oduro	Canisius (asst.)	4	21–46–6 (.329)	21–46–6 (.329)	11–20–1 (.359)	0	0	0	
Saint Joseph's	Don D'Ambra	Philadelphia Kixx	9	165–213–22 (.440)	42–97–22 (.329)	15–50–11 (.270)	0	0	0	
Saint Louis	Kevin Kalish	SIU Edwardsville	2	55–50–21 (.520)	6–4–7 (.559)	3–1–4 (.625)	0	0	0	
VCU	Dave Giffard	Akron (asst.)	9	86–64–28 (.562)	86–64–28 (.562)	45–19–11 (.673)	3	0	0	

== Preseason ==
=== Preseason poll ===
The preseason poll was released on August 22, 2019.

	Team ranking	Points (First)
1.	VCU	159 (8)
2.	Saint Louis	146 (2)
3.	Rhode Island	142 (3)
4.	Dayton	121
5.	Fordham	109
6.	Davidson	102
7.	George Mason	93
8.	Saint Joseph's	78
9.	UMass	63
10.	Duquesne	57
11.	George Washington	55
12.	St. Bonaventure	42
13.	La Salle	16

=== Preseason national polls ===
The preseason national polls will be released in July and August 2019.

	United; Soccer	CSN	Top Drawer; Soccer
Davidson	—	—	—
Dayton	—	—	—
Duquesne	—	—	—
Fordham	—	—	—
George Mason	—	—	—
George Washington	—	—	—
La Salle	—	—	—
UMass	—	—	—
Rhode Island	RV	RV	—
St. Bonaventure	—	—	—
Saint Joseph's	—	—	—
Saint Louis	RV	RV	—
VCU	RV	—	—

== Regular season ==
=== Early season tournaments ===
Five teams participated in early season soccer tournaments hosted either by themselves or other nearby universities.

Team	Tournament	Finish
Dayton	Dayton Tournament	2nd
Dayton	Ohio State Tournament	4th
Duquesne	RMU–Duquesne Classic	1st
Rhode Island	Ocean State Soccer Cup	1st
St. Bonaventure	UMBC–Navy Tournament	1st
VCU	Stihl Soccer Classic	2nd
VCU	VCU Tournament	3rd

=== Positions by round ===
Team ╲ Round	1	2	3	4	5	6	7	8
Davidson	10	10	8	8	9	10	11	8
Dayton	4	4	3	7	5	6	4	3
Duquesne	6	8	7	5	4	4	6	9
Fordham	2	3	4	6	6	7	5	5
George Mason	5	5	5	4	7	8	9	7
George Washington	13	12	9	9	10	9	8	10
La Salle	7	7	6	10	8	5	7	6
UMass	9	12	13	12	12	11	10	11
Rhode Island	8	9	4	3	3	1	1	1
St. Bonaventure	12	13	12	13	13	12	13	12
Saint Joseph's	11	11	10	11	11	13	12	13
Saint Louis	1	1	2	1	1	2	2	4
VCU	3	2	1	2	2	3	3	2

Regular season champion and 2019 Atlantic 10 Men's Soccer Tournament
2019 Atlantic 10 Men's Soccer Tournament

Source: Atlantic10.com

== Postseason ==
=== Atlantic 10 Tournament ===
The 2019 A-10 Tournament was held from November 9 to November 17. Fordham University hosted the tournament from the semifinals onwards. Rhode Island defended their A10 Tournament title and earned the conference's automatic berth into the NCAA Tournament.

Quarterfinals; November 9–10
1	Rhode Island	7
8	Davidson	3
4	Saint Louis	0
5	Fordham	1
2	VCU (p)	2 (4)
7	George Mason	2 (3)
3	Dayton	4
6	La Salle	0

Semifinals; November 15
1	Rhode Island (p)	0 (7)
5	Fordham	0 (6)
2	VCU	0
3	Dayton	1

Final; November 17
1	Rhode Island	1
3	Dayton	0

=== NCAA Tournament ===
The NCAA Tournament began on November 17, 2019, and concluded on December 15, 2019.

Seed	Region	School	1st Round	2nd Round	3rd Round	Quarterfinals	Semifinals	Championship
—	1	Rhode Island	L 2–3 vs. Syracuse – (Syracuse, NY)					
		W–L–T (%):	0–1–0 (.000)	0–0–0 (–)	0–0–0 (–)	0–0–0 (–)	0–0–0 (–)	0–0–0 (–) Total: 0–1–0 (.000)

== Rankings ==
=== National rankings ===
	Improvement in ranking
	Drop in ranking
RV	Received votes but were not ranked in Top 25
NV	No votes received

		Pre	Wk 1	Wk 2	Wk 3	Wk 4	Wk 5	Wk 6	Wk 7	Wk 8	Wk 9	Wk 10	Wk 11	Wk 12	Wk 13	Wk 14	Wk 15	Wk 16	Final
Davidson	USC	NV	NV	NV	NV	NV	NV	NV	NV	NV	NV	NV	NV	NV	None released				NV
Davidson	TDS	NV	NV	NV	NV	NV	NV	NV	NV	NV	NV	NV	NV	NV	NV	NV	NV	NV	NV
Dayton	USC	NV	NV	NV	NV	NV	NV	NV	NV	NV	NV	NV	NV	NV	None released				NV
Dayton	TDS	NV	NV	NV	NV	NV	NV	NV	NV	NV	NV	NV	NV	NV	NV	NV	NV	NV	NV
Duquesne	USC	NV	NV	NV	NV	RV	NV	NV	NV	NV	NV	NV	NV	NV	None released				NV
Duquesne	TDS	NV	NV	NV	NV	NV	NV	NV	NV	NV	NV	NV	NV	NV	NV	NV	NV	NV	NV
Fordham	USC	NV	NV	NV	NV	NV	NV	NV	NV	NV	NV	NV	NV	NV	None released				NV
Fordham	TDS	NV	NV	NV	NV	NV	NV	NV	NV	NV	NV	NV	NV	NV	NV	NV	NV	NV	NV
George Mason	USC	NV	NV	NV	NV	NV	NV	NV	NV	NV	NV	NV	NV	NV	None released				NV
George Mason	TDS	NV	NV	NV	NV	NV	NV	NV	NV	NV	NV	NV	NV	NV	NV	NV	NV	NV	NV
George Washington	USC	NV	NV	NV	NV	NV	NV	NV	NV	NV	NV	NV	NV	NV	None released				NV
George Washington	TDS	NV	NV	NV	NV	NV	NV	NV	NV	NV	NV	NV	NV	NV	NV	NV	NV	NV	NV
La Salle	USC	NV	NV	NV	NV	NV	NV	NV	NV	NV	NV	NV	NV	NV	None released				NV
La Salle	TDS	NV	NV	NV	NV	NV	NV	NV	NV	NV	NV	NV	NV	NV	NV	NV	NV	NV	NV
UMass	USC	NV	NV	NV	NV	NV	NV	NV	NV	NV	NV	NV	NV	NV	None released				NV
UMass	TDS	NV	NV	NV	NV	NV	NV	NV	NV	NV	NV	NV	NV	NV	NV	NV	NV	NV	NV
Rhode Island	USC	RV	NV	NV	NV	NV	NV	RV	NV	RV	RV	RV	RV	RV	None released				RV
Rhode Island	TDS	NV	NV	NV	NV	NV	NV	NV	NV	NV	NV	NV	NV	NV	NV	NV	NV	NV	NV
St. Bonaventure	USC	NV	NV	NV	NV	NV	NV	NV	NV	NV	NV	NV	NV	NV	None released				NV
St. Bonaventure	TDS	NV	NV	NV	NV	NV	NV	NV	NV	NV	NV	NV	NV	NV	NV	NV	NV	NV	NV
Saint Joseph's	USC	NV	NV	NV	NV	NV	NV	NV	NV	NV	NV	NV	NV	NV	None released				NV
Saint Joseph's	TDS	NV	NV	NV	NV	NV	NV	NV	NV	NV	NV	NV	NV	NV	NV	NV	NV	NV	NV
Saint Louis	USC	RV	NV	NV	NV	NV	NV	RV	RV	RV	RV	NV	NV	NV	None released				NV
Saint Louis	TDS	NV	NV	NV	NV	NV	NV	NV	NV	NV	NV	NV	NV	NV	NV	NV	NV	NV	NV
VCU	USC	RV	NV	NV	NV	NV	NV	NV	NV	NV	NV	NV	NV	NV	None released				NV
VCU	TDS	NV	NV	NV	NV	NV	NV	NV	NV	NV	NV	NV	NV	NV	NV	NV	NV	NV	NV

=== Regional rankings - USC Southeast ===
	Improvement in ranking
	Drop in ranking
RV	Received votes but were not ranked in Top 10
NV	No votes received

	Wk 1	Wk 2	Wk 3	Wk 4	Wk 5	Wk 6	Wk 7	Wk 8	Wk 9	Wk 10
Davidson	NV	NV	NV	NV	NV	NV	NV	NV	NV	NV
Dayton	NV	NV	NV	NV	8	RV	NV	10	9	9
Duquesne	NV	NV	10	7	NV	8	10	NV	NV	NV
Fordham	NV	NV	NV	NV	NV	NV	NV	NV	NV	NV
George Mason	NV	NV	NV	NV	NV	NV	NV	NV	NV	NV
George Washington	NV	NV	NV	NV	NV	NV	NV	NV	NV	NV
La Salle	NV	NV	NV	NV	NV	10	NV	NV	NV	NV
UMass	10	6	7	NV	NV	NV	NV	NV	NV	NV
Rhode Island	NV	NV	NV	NV	NV	9	7	6	6	6
St. Bonaventure	NV	NV	NV	NV	NV	NV	NV	NV	NV	NV
Saint Joseph's	NV	NV	NV	NV	NV	NV	NV	NV	NV	NV
Saint Louis	NV	NV	NV	10	9	7	5	5	5	7
VCU	6	NV	NV	NV	NV	NV	NV	NV	NV	NV

== Awards and honors ==
=== Player of the week honors ===
Week	Offensive			Defensive			Rookie			Ref.
Week	Player	Position	Team	Player	Position	Team	Player	Position	Team	Ref.
Week 1	Tunde Akinlosotu	FW	George Mason	Robbie McKelvey	GK	Duquesne	Maverick McGann	FW	VCU	
Week 2	Ritchie Barry	FW	Duquesne	Marvyn Dorchin	DF	UMass	Alex Hartmann	MF	Saint Joseph's	
Week 3	Max Holdsworth	MF	George Washington	Justin Grady	DF	George Washington	Justin Stone	MF	Davidson	
Week 4	Manel Busquets	FW	Duquesne	Robbie McKelvey	GK	Duquesne	Toluwalase Oladeinbo	MF	Dayton	
Week 5	Omari Cotterell	FW	La Salle	Federico Barrios	GK	Dayton	Carlos Mora	GK	La Salle	
Week 5	Ryo Shimazaki	MF	VCU	Federico Barrios	GK	Dayton	Carlos Mora	GK	La Salle	
Week 6	Edvin Akselsen	FW	Rhode Island	Brett Werner	DF	La Salle	Nate Dragisich	MF	Duquesne	
Week 7	Jonas Fjeldberg	FW	Dayton	Patrick Schulte	GK	Saint Louis	Toluwalase Oladeinbo	MF	Dayton	
Week 8	Jonas Fjeldberg	FW	Dayton	Xavier Zengue	DF	Dayton	Toluwalase Oladeinbo	MF	Dayton	
Week 9	Jonas Fjeldberg	FW	Dayton	Mario Sequeira	GK	VCU	Carlos Mora	GK	La Salle	
Week 10	Lucas Hauth	FW	Davidson	Konstantin Weisa	GK	Fordham	Justin Stone	MF	Davidson	

=== Postseason honors ===
2019 Atlantic 10 Men's Soccer Individual Awards
Award	Recipient(s)
Offensive Player of the Year	Jonas Fjeldberg – Dayton
Defensive Player of the Year	Jørgen Oland – Fordham
Midfielder of the Year	Kingsford Adjei – Dayton
Coach of the Year	Gareth Elliott – Rhode Island
Freshman of the Year	Toluwalase Oladeinbo – Dayton

2019 Atlantic 10 Men's Soccer All-Conference Teams
First Team Honorees	Second Team Honorees	All-Freshman Team Honorees	Academic Award Honorees
Jonas Fjeldberg, Dayton; Fillippo Tamburini, Rhode Island; Stavros Zarokostas, Rhode Island; Leo Novaes, Saint Louis; Kingsford Adjei, Dayton; Manel Busquets, Duquesne; Edvin Akselsen, Rhode Island; Jørgen Oland, Fordham; Peder Kristiansen, Rhode Island; Ryo Shimazaki, VCU; Federico Barrios, Dayton	Toluwalase Oladeinbo, Dayton; Pat McCarthy, La Salle; Biska Biyombo, VCU; Devin Boyce, Saint Louis; Matteo Kidd, Saint Louis; Fortia Munts, VCU; Elias Harryson, Dayton; Niklas Middrup, Rhode Island; Kipp Keller, Saint Louis; Ulrik Edvardsen, VCU; Stefan Schmidt, Rhode Island	Justin Stone, Davidson; Toluwalase Oladeinbo, Dayton; Andy Sanchez, Dayton; Xavier Zengue, Dayton; Nate Dragisich, Duquesne; Liam Emson, George Washington; Franc Gamiz Quer, La Salle; Joshua Pulla, St. Bonaventure; Kipp Keller, Saint Louis; Mujeeb Murana, Saint Louis; Patrick Schulte, Saint Louis	Johannes Pieles, Fordham; Ryan Mingachos, George Mason; Haukur Hilmarsson, George Washington; Noah Lubin, George Washington; Ryan Saul, Massachusetts; Peder Kristiansen, Rhode Island; Niklas Middrup, Rhode Island; Stefan Schmidt, Rhode Island; Shea Curry, St. Bonaventure; David Grana, Saint Joseph's; David Viox, Saint Louis; Simon Fitch, VCU

=== Regional awards ===
Player	Pos.	School	Honor	Ref.
Kingsford Adjei	MF	Dayton	United Soccer Coaches Third-Team All-Southeast Region	
Edvin Akselsen	MF	Rhode Island	United Soccer Coaches Second-Team All-Southeast Region	
Biska Biyombo	FW	VCU	United Soccer Coaches Third-Team All-Southeast Region	
Manel Busquets	MF	Duquesne	United Soccer Coaches Second-Team All-Southeast Region	
Jonas Fjeldberg	FW	Dayton	United Soccer Coaches Second-Team All-Southeast Region	
Kipp Keller	MF	Saint Louis	United Soccer Coaches Third-Team All-Southeast Region	
Peder Kristiansen	DF	Rhode Island	United Soccer Coaches First-Team All-Southeast Region	
Leo Novaes	FW	Saint Louis	United Soccer Coaches Second-Team All-Southeast Region	
Jørgen Oland	DF	Fordham	United Soccer Coaches Third-Team All-Southeast Region	
Ryo Shimazaki	DF	VCU	United Soccer Coaches Third-Team All-Southeast Region	
Stavros Zarokostas	FW	Rhode Island	United Soccer Coaches Third-Team All-Southeast Region	

=== National awards ===
Player	Pos.	School	Honor	Ref.
David Grana	DF	Saint Joseph's	CoSIDA Third-Team Academic All-American	
Kipp Keller	MF	Saint Louis	College Soccer News First-Team Freshman All-American	
Kipp Keller	MF	Saint Louis	TopDrawer Soccer First-Team Freshman All-American	
Peder Kristiansen	DF	Rhode Island	College Soccer News Third-Team All-American	
Peder Kristiansen	DF	Rhode Island	Soccer America Third-Team All-American	
Peder Kristiansen	DF	Rhode Island	United Soccer Coaches Third-Team All-American	
Johannes Pieles	FW	Fordham	CoSIDA Third-Team Academic All-American	

== 2020 MLS Draft ==
The 2020 MLS SuperDraft was held on January 9, 2020. Three players from the conference were drafted.

=== Total picks by school ===
Team	Round 1	Round 2	Round 3	Round 4	Total
Davidson	0	0	0	0	0
Dayton	0	0	0	0	0
Duquesne	0	0	0	0	0
Fordham	0	0	0	1	1
George Mason	0	0	0	0	0
George Washington	0	0	0	0	0
La Salle	0	0	0	0	0
UMass	0	0	0	0	0
Rhode Island	0	0	1	0	1
St. Bonaventure	0	0	0	0	0
Saint Joseph's	0	0	0	0	0
Saint Louis	0	0	0	0	0
VCU	0	0	1	0	1

=== List of selections ===
Rnd.	Pick	Player	Pos.	Team	School
3	59	Ryo Shimazaki	DF	Columbus Crew	VCU (Sr.)
3	62	Stavros Zarokostas	FW	New York Red Bulls	Rhode Island (Sr.)
4	94	Joergen Oland	DF	Portland Timbers	Fordham (Sr.)

== Homegrown players ==
The Homegrown Player Rule is a Major League Soccer program that allows MLS teams to sign local players from their own development academies directly to MLS first team rosters. Before the creation of the rule in 2008, every player entering Major League Soccer had to be assigned through one of the existing MLS player allocation processes, such as the MLS SuperDraft.

To place a player on its homegrown player list, making him eligible to sign as a homegrown player, players must have resided in that club's home territory and participated in the club's youth development system for at least one year. Players can play college soccer and still be eligible to sign a homegrown contract.

No players from the Atlantic 10 Conference signed homegrown contracts.
