= Atlantic 10 Conference Men's Soccer Coach of the Year =

The Atlantic 10 Conference Men's Soccer Coach of the Year is an annual award given to the best head coach in the Atlantic 10 Conference during the NCAA Division I men's soccer season. The award has been given since 1987.

Wade Jean and Sam Koch have each won the award four times.

== Winners ==
=== Coach of the Year (1987–present) ===
Season	Coach	School	Reference
1987	Bob Reasso	Rutgers	
1988	John Boles	Temple	
1989	George Lidster	George Washington	
1990	Bob Reasso (2)	Rutgers	
1991	Bob Reasso (3)	Rutgers	
1992	Sam Koch; George Lidster (2)	UMass; George Washington	
1993	Tom Turner	Saint Joseph's	
1994	Sam Koch (2)	UMass	
1995	Ed Bradley	Rhode Island	
1996	Pat Farrell	La Salle	
1997	Jerry Cheynet	Virginia Tech	
1998	Frank Schnur	Fordham	
1999	Wade Jean	Duquesne	
2000	Dave Schureck	Dayton	
2001	Ed Bradley (2)	Rhode Island	
2002	Wade Jean (2); Sam Koch (3)	Duquesne; UMass	
2003	Jeff Gettler	Richmond	
2004	Wade Jean (3)	Duquesne	
2005	Wade Jean (4)	Duquesne	
2006	Dan Donigan	Saint Louis	
2007	Dan Donigan (2)	Saint Louis	
2008	Sam Koch (4)	UMass	
2009	Dennis Currier	Dayton	
2010	Pat Farrell (2)	La Salle	
2011	George Lidster (3)	George Washington	
2012	Mike McGinty	Saint Louis	
2013	Mike McGinty (2)	Saint Louis	
2014	Gareth Elliott	Rhode Island	
2015	Craig Jones	George Washington	
2016	Mike McGinty (3)	Saint Louis	
2017	Fran O'Leary (3)	UMass	
2018	David Giffard	VCU	
2019	Gareth Elliott (2)	Rhode Island	
2020	Dennis Currier (2)	Dayton	
2021	Kevin Kalish	Saint Louis	
2022	Kevin Kalish (2)	Saint Louis	
2023	David Giffard (2)	VCU	
2024	Rich Costanzo	George Mason	
2025	Kevin Kalish (3)	Saint Louis	
2026	Chase Brooks	Duquesne	
