= 2019 Atlantic 10 men's soccer tournament =

- Classification: Division I
- Teams: 8
- Quarterfinals site: Higher seeds
- Semifinals site: Coffey Field; Bronx, NY
- Finals site: Coffey Field; Bronx, NY
- Champions: Rhode Island (8th title)
- Winning coach: Gareth Elliott (2nd title)
- MVP: Ludvik Benco (Rhode Island)
- Broadcast: ESPN+

2019 Atlantic 10 Conference men's soccer standings
	Conf.					Overall
Team	W		L		T	W		L		T
Rhode Island ‡	7	–	1	–	0	14	–	4	–	3
VCU	6	–	1	–	1	7	–	8	–	3
Dayton	6	–	2	–	0	13	–	8	–	0
Saint Louis	6	–	2	–	0	10	–	7	–	0
Fordham	5	–	2	–	1	7	–	10	–	3
La Salle	4	–	4	–	0	8	–	9	–	1
Duquesne	3	–	5	–	0	8	–	8	–	1
UMass	3	–	5	–	0	7	–	10	–	0
George Washington	3	–	5	–	0	5	–	11	–	1
George Mason	3	–	5	–	0	4	–	12	–	2
Davidson	3	–	5	–	0	3	–	11	–	2
Saint Joseph's	1	–	7	–	0	5	–	12	–	1
St. Bonaventure	1	–	7	–	0	5	–	11	–	0
‡ – 2019 Atlantic 10 Tournament champion + – Invited to the 2019 NCAA tournament; As of 22 November 2019; Rankings from United Soccer Coaches

The 2019 Atlantic 10 men's soccer tournament, was the 22nd edition of the Atlantic 10 Men's Soccer Tournament. It determined the Atlantic 10 Conference's automatic berth into the 2019 NCAA Division I men's soccer tournament. The tournament was held from November 9 to November 17, 2019. The semifinal and finals were hosted by Fordham University with matches being played at Coffey Field in The Bronx, New York.

Rhode Island were the defending tournament champions, and successfully defended their title, beating Dayton, 1–0, in the championship. Rhode Island would go on to be eliminated by Syracuse in the opening round of the NCAA Tournament.

== Seeds ==
Seed	School	Conference	Tiebreaker
1	Rhode Island	7–1–0	
2	VCU	6–1–1	
3	Dayton	6–2–0	DAY 2–1 vs. STL
4	Saint Louis	6–2–0	STL 1–2 vs. DAY
5	Fordham	5–2–1	
6	La Salle	4–4–0	
7	George Mason	3–5–0	2–0 vs. tied teams
8	Davidson	3–5–0	2–1 vs. tied teams (excludes George Mason)

After the regular season games concluded, five teams were in a tie for seventh place in the conference, all with 3-5 records. A series of tiebreakers involving wins and loss records in matches played among the subgroup determined the last two bids into the A10 Tournament as George Mason and Davidson.

== Bracket ==
Quarterfinals; November 9–10
1	Rhode Island	7
8	Davidson	3
4	Saint Louis	0
5	Fordham	1
2	VCU (p)	2 (4)
7	George Mason	2 (3)
3	Dayton	4
6	La Salle	0

Semifinals; November 15
1	Rhode Island (p)	0 (7)
5	Fordham	0 (6)
2	VCU	0
3	Dayton	1

Final; November 17
1	Rhode Island	1
3	Dayton	0

== Results ==
=== Quarterfinals ===
November 9
3:00 p.m.

No. 4 Saint Louis	0–1	No. 5 Fordham
	Report	Ricupati 87'

Hermann Stadium, St. Louis
Attendance: 752
Referee: William DeLois

November 9
7:00 p.m.

No. 1 Rhode Island	7–3	No. 8 Davidson
Karterud 2'; Tamburini 27'; Kristiansen 32'; Booth 49'; Zarokostas 51'; Middrup 61'; Kolakofsky 68'	Report	DiLuzio 59'; Alzate 85'; Morrissett 87'

URI Soccer Complex, Kingston
Attendance: 1,539
Referee: Patrick Violette

November 9
7:00 p.m.

No. 2 VCU	2–2 (a.e.t.)	No. 7 George Mason
Pompeu 68'; Shimazaki 90' (pen.)	Report	Akinlosotu 17'; Robinson 33'
Penalties
Edvarsen (penalty scored); Pompeu (penalty missed); Fitch (penalty scored); Sewell (penalty scored); Valdes (penalty scored)	4–3	(penalty scored) Mingachos; (penalty missed) Lawal; (penalty scored) Damiani; (penalty scored) Malinowski; (penalty missed) Buijk

Sports Backers Stadium, Richmond
Attendance: 340

November 10
1:00 p.m.

No. 3 Dayton	4–0	No. 6 La Salle
Adjei 34', 74'; Dos Santos 54'; Fjeldberg 84'	Report

Baujan Field, Dayton
Attendance: 403
Referee: Eric Tattersall

=== Semifinals ===
November 15
1:00 p.m.

No. 2 VCU	0–1	No. 3 Dayton
	Report	Adjei 31' (pen.)

Coffey Field, New York City
Attendance: 602
Referee: Bahij Salman

November 15
4:00 p.m.

No. 1 Rhode Island	0–0 (a.e.t.)	No. 5 Fordham
Penalties
Akselsen (penalty scored); Zarokostas (penalty scored); Kristiansen (penalty missed); Tamburini (penalty scored); Kolakofsky (penalty scored); Middrup (penalty scored); Schmidt (penalty missed); Benco (penalty scored); Trcka (penalty scored)	7–6	(penalty missed) Ricupati; (penalty scored) Dziedzic; (penalty scored) Bohm; (penalty scored) Fathazada; (penalty scored) Sluys; (penalty scored) McNamara; (penalty missed) Shkreli; (penalty scored) Zloczower; (penalty missed) Murphy

Coffey Field, New York City
Attendance: 602
Referee: Noel Cotterell

=== A10 Championship ===
November 17
12:00 p.m.

No. 1 Rhode Island	1–0	No. 3 Dayton
Akselsen 51'	Report

Coffey Field, New York City
Attendance: 606
Referee: Mark Gorak

== Statistics ==
=== Goalscorers ===
2 Goals

- (Ghana) Kingsford Adjei – Dayton

1 Goal

- (United States) Mateo Alzate – Davidson
- (Nigeria) Tunde Akinlosotu – George Mason
- (United States) Charlie Booth – Rhode Island
- (United States) Jaime DiLuzio – Davidson
- (Switzerland) Daniel Dos Santos – Dayton
- (Norway) Jonas Fjeldberg – Dayton
- (Norway) Sondre Karterud – Rhode Island
- (Israel) Noam Kolakofsky – Rhode Island
- (Norway) Peder Kristiansen – Rhode Island
- (Germany) Niklas Middrup – Rhode Island
- (United States) Ned Morrissett – Davidson
- (Brazil) Celio Pompeu – VCU
- (Italy) Filippo Ricupati – Fordham
- (United States) Grant Robinson – George Mason
- (Japan) Ryo Shimazaki – VCU
- (Italy) Filippo Tamburini – Rhode Island
- (Cyprus) Stavros Zarokostas – Rhode Island
