= 2022 Atlantic 10 Conference men's soccer season =

- League: NCAA Division I
- Sport: Soccer
- Duration: August, 2022 – November, 2022

Tournament
- Champions: Saint Louis
- Runners-up: Loyola Chicago

A-10 men's soccer seasons
- ← 2021 2023 →

2022 Atlantic 10 Conference men's soccer standings
| | Conf. | | | | | Overall |
| Team | W | | L | | T | W | | L | | T |
|---|---|---|---|---|---|---|---|---|---|---|
| No. 25 Saint Louis‡ | 6 | – | 1 | – | 1 | 12 | – | 5 | – | 3 |
| Duquesne | 4 | – | 1 | – | 3 | 11 | – | 4 | – | 4 |
| VCU | 3 | – | 1 | – | 4 | 3 | – | 8 | – | 6 |
| Dayton | 3 | – | 2 | – | 3 | 10 | – | 2 | – | 5 |
| Loyola Chicago | 3 | – | 2 | – | 3 | 9 | – | 2 | – | 7 |
| George Washington | 4 | – | 4 | – | 0 | 8 | – | 8 | – | 2 |
| UMass | 2 | – | 1 | – | 5 | 7 | – | 4 | – | 7 |
| La Salle | 3 | – | 3 | – | 2 | 5 | – | 9 | – | 4 |
| Rhode Island | 2 | – | 2 | – | 4 | 6 | – | 3 | – | 7 |
| Saint Joseph's | 2 | – | 2 | – | 4 | 3 | – | 6 | – | 8 |
| Davidson | 3 | – | 4 | – | 1 | 6 | – | 8 | – | 3 |
| Fordham | 1 | – | 2 | – | 5 | 3 | – | 4 | – | 9 |
| George Mason | 1 | – | 6 | – | 1 | 2 | – | 11 | – | 2 |
| St. Bonaventure | 0 | – | 6 | – | 2 | 3 | – | 10 | – | 3 |
‡ – 2022 Atlantic 10 Tournament champion + – At-large invitation to the 2022 NCAA Tournament; As of December 13, 2022; Rankings from United Soccer Coaches; Source: Atlantic 10

The 2022 Atlantic 10 Conference men's soccer season was the 36th season for the Conference fielding men's NCAA Division I men's college soccer. The season culminated with the 2022 Atlantic 10 men's soccer tournament, where the top schools in the conference competed for a guaranteed berth into the 2022 NCAA Division I men's soccer tournament. Saint Louis won the 2022 conference championship over Loyola Chicago.

== Regular season ==
For the second straight season, Saint Louis finished with the No. 1 seed in the Atlantic 10 at the end of the regular season.

== Conference tournament ==
Saint Louis won back to back Atlantic 10 tournament championships, defeating Loyola Chicago.

== NCAA tournament qualifiers from A-10 ==
Saint Louis was the only team to qualify for the 2022 NCAA tournament out of the Atlantic 10 earning the conference’s auto bid.

== See also ==
- Atlantic 10 Conference
- 2022 in American soccer
- 2022 NCAA Division I men's soccer season
