= 2021 Atlantic 10 Conference men's soccer season =

- League: NCAA Division I
- Sport: Soccer
- Duration: August, 2021 – November, 2021

Tournament
- Champions: Saint Louis
- Runners-up: Duquesne

A-10 men's soccer seasons
- ← 2020 2022 →

2021 Atlantic 10 Conference men's soccer standings
	Conf.					Overall
Team	W		L		T	W		L		T
No. 7 Saint Louis ‡	8	–	0	–	0	16	–	1	–	4
Rhode Island	5	–	2	–	1	10	–	5	–	2
Saint Joseph's	5	–	2	–	1	8	–	9	–	2
VCU	4	–	3	–	1	9	–	7	–	2
Fordham	4	–	3	–	1	7	–	9	–	3
Duquesne	3	–	3	–	2	10	–	7	–	2
Davidson	3	–	3	–	2	9	–	7	–	2
UMass	2	–	2	–	4	8	–	4	–	5
Dayton	3	–	4	–	1	6	–	9	–	3
George Washington	3	–	4	–	1	5	–	10	–	2
St. Bonaventure	3	–	5	–	0	4	–	10	–	1
La Salle	2	–	6	–	0	6	–	10	–	0
George Mason	0	–	8	–	0	2	–	13	–	1
‡ – 2021 Atlantic 10 Tournament champion + – At-large invitation to the 2021 NCAA tournament; As of December 14, 2021; Rankings from United Soccer Coaches; Source: Atlantic 10

The 2021 Atlantic 10 Conference men's soccer season was the 35th season for the Conference fielding men's NCAA Division I men's college soccer. The season culminated with the 2021 Atlantic 10 Men's Soccer Tournament, where the top schools in the conference competed for a guaranteed berth into the 2021 NCAA Division I men's soccer tournament. The defending conference tournament winners were the Fordham Rams. Saint Louis won the 2021 conference championship over Duquesne.

== Regular season ==
Saint Louis finished as the top seed in the Atlantic 10 for the 2021 season with a perfect 8-0-0 conference record. Saint Louis was ranked as the No. 7 team in the country at the conclusion of the regular season.

== Atlantic-10 postseason ==
After finishing No. 1 in the conference during the regular season, Saint Louis went on to defeat Duquesne in the 2021 Atlantic-10 championship game to win the 2021 conference tournament.

== NCAA tournament qualifiers from A-10 ==
Saint Louis went into the 2021 NCAA tournament with an undefeated 14-0-4 record. In the NCAA tournament, Saint Louis would fall to Washington in the quarterfinals, finishing with an overall 16-1-4 record.

== See also ==
- Atlantic 10 Conference
- 2021 in American soccer
- 2021 NCAA Division I men's soccer season
