= 2024 Atlantic 10 Conference men's soccer season =

- League: NCAA Division I
- Sport: Soccer
- Duration: August, 2024 – November, 2024

Tournament
- Champions: Dayton
- Runners-up: Saint Louis

A-10 men's soccer seasons
- ← 2023 2025 →

2024 Atlantic 10 Conference men's soccer standings
	Conf.					Overall
Team	W		L		T	W		L		T
George Mason	6	–	1	–	1	13	–	4	–	1
No. 12 Dayton ‡	5	–	1	–	2	13	–	2	–	3
Duquesne	5	–	2	–	1	11	–	4	–	2
No. 8 UMass +	5	–	2	–	1	10	–	3	–	5
Fordham +	4	–	1	–	3	8	–	5	–	5
Saint Louis +	4	–	1	–	3	8	–	4	–	8
Davidson	4	–	4	–	0	6	–	7	–	5
La Salle	3	–	3	–	2	6	–	8	–	4
Loyola Chicago	3	–	5	–	1	5	–	10	–	3
St. Bonaventure	2	–	4	–	2	6	–	8	–	3
VCU	1	–	4	–	3	4	–	6	–	7
Rhode Island	2	–	6	–	0	7	–	7	–	3
George Washington	1	–	6	–	1	3	–	12	–	2
Saint Joseph's	1	–	7	–	0	4	–	12	–	0
‡ – 2024 Atlantic 10 tournament champion + – At-large invitation to the 2024 NCAA tournament; As of December 18, 2024; Rankings from United Soccer Coaches; Source: Atlantic 10

The 2024 Atlantic 10 Conference men's soccer season was the 38th season for the conference fielding men's NCAA Division I men's college soccer. The season culminated with the 2024 Atlantic 10 men's soccer tournament, where the top schools in the conference competed for a guaranteed berth into the 2024 NCAA Division I men's soccer tournament.

Dayton won the 2024 conference championship over Saint Louis. In addition to Dayton's automatic bid into the NCAA tournament, UMass, Fordham, and Saint Louis earned at-large bids into the NCAA tournament.

== See also ==
- Atlantic 10 Conference
- 2024 in American soccer
- 2024 NCAA Division I men's soccer season
