= 2019 Rhode Island Rams men's soccer team =

American college soccer season

2019 Rhode Island Rams men's soccer

Atlantic 10 Regular Season and Tournament champions Ocean State Cup champions

NCAA Tournament, First Round
- Conference: Atlantic 10 Conference

Ranking
- Coaches: No. 23
- Record: 14–4–2 (7–1–0 A10)
- Head coach: Gareth Elliott (7th season)
- Assistant coaches: Tony Bassett (6th season); Frank Bergren (20th season); Kyle Froberg (4th season)
- Captains: Stavros Zarokostas; Niklas Middrup; Peder Kristiansen
- Home stadium: URI Soccer Complex

2019 Atlantic 10 Conference men's soccer standings
| | Conf. | | | | | Overall |
| Team | W | | L | | T | W | | L | | T |
|---|---|---|---|---|---|---|---|---|---|---|
| Rhode Island ‡ | 7 | – | 1 | – | 0 | 14 | – | 4 | – | 3 |
| VCU | 6 | – | 1 | – | 1 | 7 | – | 8 | – | 3 |
| Dayton | 6 | – | 2 | – | 0 | 13 | – | 8 | – | 0 |
| Saint Louis | 6 | – | 2 | – | 0 | 10 | – | 7 | – | 0 |
| Fordham | 5 | – | 2 | – | 1 | 7 | – | 10 | – | 3 |
| La Salle | 4 | – | 4 | – | 0 | 8 | – | 9 | – | 1 |
| Duquesne | 3 | – | 5 | – | 0 | 8 | – | 8 | – | 1 |
| UMass | 3 | – | 5 | – | 0 | 7 | – | 10 | – | 0 |
| George Washington | 3 | – | 5 | – | 0 | 5 | – | 11 | – | 1 |
| George Mason | 3 | – | 5 | – | 0 | 4 | – | 12 | – | 2 |
| Davidson | 3 | – | 5 | – | 0 | 3 | – | 11 | – | 2 |
| Saint Joseph's | 1 | – | 7 | – | 0 | 5 | – | 12 | – | 1 |
| St. Bonaventure | 1 | – | 7 | – | 0 | 5 | – | 11 | – | 0 |
‡ – 2019 Atlantic 10 Tournament champion + – Invited to the 2019 NCAA tournament; As of 22 November 2019; Rankings from United Soccer Coaches

The 2019 Rhode Island Rams men's soccer team represented the University of Rhode Island during the 2019 NCAA Division I men's soccer season. It was the 59th season of the university fielding a program. The Rams were led by seventh-year head coach, Gareth Elliott.

== Background ==
Rhode Island finished the 2018 season with a 15–5–0 overall record and a 5–3–0 record in Atlantic 10 play, to finish 3rd in the conference. Rhode Island won the 2018 Atlantic 10 Men's Soccer Tournament and earned a berth into the 2018 NCAA Division I Men's Soccer Tournament. There, they lost to UConn in overtime, 3–4. It was Rhode Island's first berth into the NCAA Tournament since 2006.

Dominik Richter and Peder Kristiansen were named to the Atlantic 10 first team.

== Roster ==
As of December 5, 2019

Note: Flags indicate national team as defined under FIFA eligibility rules; some limited exceptions apply. Players may hold more than one non-FIFA nationality.

| No. | Pos. | Nation | Player |
|---|---|---|---|
| 1 | GK | (Germany) GER | Stefan Schmidt |
| 2 | DF | (Norway) NOR | Sondre Karterud |
| 3 | DF | (Norway) NOR | Peder Kristiansen |
| 4 | MF | (United States) USA | Garrett Cronin |
| 5 | MF | (England) ENG | Harvey Read |
| 6 | DF | (Germany) GER | Niklas Middrup |
| 7 | FW | (Czech Republic) CZE | Simon Trčka |
| 8 | MF | (Norway) NOR | Ludvik Benco |
| 9 | FW | (Greece) GRE | Stavros Zarokostas |
| 10 | MF | (Israel) ISR | Noam Kolakofsky |
| 11 | FW | (Italy) ITA | Filippo Tamburini |
| 12 | DF | (United States) USA | Zach Drayer |

| No. | Pos. | Nation | Player |
|---|---|---|---|
| 14 | MF | (United States) USA | Robert McManus |
| 16 | DF | (United States) USA | Lucas Gesmundo |
| 17 | MF | (United States) USA | Ewan Noble |
| 19 | FW | (United States) USA | Braeden Cannon |
| 21 | DF | (United States) USA | Charlie Booth |
| 22 | DF | (United States) USA | Derick Arhin |
| 23 | MF | (United States) USA | Jacob Maddox |
| 24 | DF | (Canada) CAN | Rohun Kawale |
| 28 | MF | (Norway) NOR | Edvin Akselsen |
| 29 | GK | (United States) USA | Trevor Dalton |
| 30 | GK | (Bermuda) BER | Andrew Kempe |

== Schedule ==
| Date Time, TV | Rank^{#} | Opponent^{#} | Result | Record | Site (Attendance) City, State |
Regular season
| August 30*; 7:00 p.m. | | Fairfield | T 1–1 ^{2OT} | 0–0–1 | URI Soccer Complex (711); Kingston, RI |
| September 3*; 7:00 p.m. | | No. 23 UConn | L 1–3 | 0–1–1 | URI Soccer Complex (1,509); Kingston, RI |
| September 6*; 5:00 p.m. | | at Boston College | L 1–2 | 0–2–1 | Newton Soccer Complex (351); Chestnut Hill, MA |
| September 9*; 7:00 p.m., Cox/Yurview | | Providence; Ocean State Cup | W 2–1 | 1–2–1 | URI Soccer Complex (2,108); Kingston, RI |
| September 13*; 7:00 p.m. | | Merrimack | W 2–1 | 2–2–1 | URI Soccer Complex (611); Kingston, RI |
| September 17*; 6:00 p.m. | | at Central Connecticut | T 1–1 ^{2OT} | 2–2–2 | Central Connecticut Soccer Field (438); New Britain, CT |
| September 21; 3:00 p.m. | | at George Washington | W 1–0 ^{OT} | 3–2–2 (1–0–0) | Mount Vernon Athletic Field (441); Washington, DC |
| September 24*; 8:00 p.m. | | at Holy Cross | W 3–1 | 4–2–2 | Linda Johnson Smith Stadium (160); Worcester, MA |
| September 28; 8:00 p.m., ESPN+ | | at Saint Louis | L 0–1 | 4–3–2 (1–1–0) | Hermann Stadium (3,192); St. Louis, MO |
| October 5; 7:00 p.m., A10N | | Fordham | W 3–1 | 5–3–2 (2–1–0) | URI Soccer Complex (281); Kingston, RI |
| October 9; 7:00 p.m., ESPN+ | | La Salle | W 3–2 | 6–3–2 (3–1–0) | URI Soccer Complex (510); Kingston, RI |
| October 12; 7:00 p.m., ESPN+ | | at Saint Joseph's | W 2–0 | 7–3–2 (4–1–0) | Sweeney Field (612); Philadelphia, PA |
| October 15*; 7:00 p.m. | | at Brown; Ocean State Cup | W 1–0 | 8–3–2 | Stevenson-Pincince Field (205); Providence, RI |
| October 19; 7:00 p.m., ESPN+ | | VCU | W 2–1 | 9–3–2 (5–1–0) | URI Soccer Complex (409); Kingston, RI |
| October 23; 2:00 p.m., ESPN+ | | at UMass | W 3–1 | 10–3–2 (6–1–0) | Rudd Field (249); Amherst, MA |
| October 26; 7:00 p.m., ESPN+ | | Davidson; Senior Night | W 2–0 | 11–3–2 (7–1–0) | URI Soccer Complex (1,271); Kingston, RI |
| November 2*; 7:00 p.m. | No. 23 | at Denver | W 2–1 ^{OT} | 12–3–2 | CIBER Field (417); Denver, CO |
Atlantic 10 Tournament
| November 9; 7:05 p.m., ESPN+ | (1) No. 23 | (8) Davidson; Quarterfinals | W 7–3 | 13–3–2 | URI Soccer Complex (1,539); Kingston, RI |
| November 15; 1:05 p.m., ESPN+ | (1) No. 23 | at (5) Fordham; Semifinals | T 0–0 ^{2OT} | 13–3–3 | Coffey Field (602); The Bronx, NY |
| November 17; 12:05 p.m., ESPN+ | (1) No. 23 | vs. (3) Dayton; Final | W 1–0 | 14–3–3 | Coffey Field (466); The Bronx, NY |
NCAA Tournament
| November 21; 7:00 p.m., ACCN | No. 23 | at No. 25 Syracuse; First round | L 2–3 | 14–4–3 | SU Soccer Stadium (472); Syracuse, NY |
*Non-conference game. ^{#}Rankings from CollegeSoccerNews.com. (#) Tournament seedings in parentheses. All times are in Eastern Time.

== Rankings ==
Ranking movements Legend: ██ Increase in ranking ██ Decrease in ranking — = Not ranked RV = Received votes
| | Week | | | | | | | | | | | | | | |
| Poll | Pre | 1 | 2 | 3 | 4 | 5 | 6 | 7 | 8 | 9 | 10 | 11 | 12 | 13 | Final |
|---|---|---|---|---|---|---|---|---|---|---|---|---|---|---|---|
| United Soccer | RV | — | — | — | — | — | — | — | — | — | RV | RV | RV | RV | |
| Top Drawer Soccer | — | — | — | — | — | — | — | — | — | — | — | — | RV | RV | |
| College Soccer News | RV | — | — | — | — | — | — | — | RV | RV | 27 | 23 | 23 | 23 | |
| Soccer America | RV | — | — | — | — | — | — | — | — | RV | RV | RV | 25 | 16 | 16 |
