= 2020 Atlantic 10 men's soccer tournament =

- Classification: Division I
- Teams: 4
- Semifinals site: Baujan Field; Dayton, OH
- Finals site: Baujan Field; Dayton, OH
- Champions: Fordham (4th title)
- Winning coach: Carlo Acquista (1st title)
- Broadcast: ESPN+

2020 Atlantic 10 Conference men's soccer standings
	Conf.					Overall
Team	W		L		T	W		L		T
Central
George Washington	3	–	1	–	2	5	–	3	–	2
VCU	3	–	2	–	1	4	–	3	–	2
Davidson	2	–	2	–	2	3	–	4	–	2
George Mason	0	–	3	–	3	0	–	6	–	3
North
No. 22 Fordham ‡	3	–	0	–	2	7	–	1	–	2
UMass +	3	–	1	–	2	7	–	2	–	2
La Salle	2	–	3	–	1	5	–	5	–	1
Rhode Island	1	–	3	–	1	2	–	4	–	1
Saint Joseph's	1	–	4	–	0	3	–	7	–	0
West
Dayton	4	–	1	–	1	4	–	4	–	1
Saint Louis	4	–	2	–	0	9	–	5	–	0
Duquesne	2	–	4	–	0	2	–	5	–	0
St. Bonaventure	1	–	4	–	1	4	–	4	–	1
‡ – 2020 Atlantic 10 Tournament champion + – Also invited to the 2020 NCAA tournament; As of May 28, 2021; Rankings from United Soccer Coaches

The 2020 Atlantic 10 men's soccer tournament, was the 22nd edition of the Atlantic 10 Men's Soccer Tournament. It determined the Atlantic 10 Conference's automatic berth into the 2020 NCAA Division I men's soccer tournament. Due to the COVID-19 pandemic, the tournament was postponed from November 2020 to April 2021, with semifinals played on April 15 and the final played on April 17, 2021.

Fordham won the Atlantic 10 championship, for the first time since 2017, defeating George Washington in the final.

== Seeds ==
Seed	School	Conference	Tiebreaker
1	Dayton	4–1–1	
2	Saint Louis	4–2–0	
3	Fordham	3–0–2	
4	George Washington	3–1–2	

== Bracket ==
Semifinals; April 15
1	Dayton	0
4	George Washington	1
2	Saint Louis	1
3	Fordham	2

Final; April 17
4	George Washington	0
3	Fordham	2

== Matches ==
=== Semifinals ===
April 15
12:00 p.m.

(1) Dayton	0–1	(4) George Washington
	Report	Weber 54'

Baujan Field, Dayton
Attendance: 100
Referee: Calin Radosav

April 15
4:00 p.m.

(2) Saint Louis	1–2	(3) Fordham
TEAM 35'	Report	Sloan 55'; Pangrazzi 58'

Baujan Field, Dayton
Attendance: 100
Referee: Peter Dhima

=== Final ===
April 17
12:00 p.m.

(3) Fordham	2–0	(4) George Washington
Sloan 30'; Pangrazzi 55'	Report

Baujan Field, Dayton
Attendance: 100
Referee: Mark Buda
