= 2023 Atlantic 10 Conference men's soccer season =

- League: NCAA Division I
- Sport: Soccer
- Duration: August 2023 – November 2023

Tournament
- Champions: Dayton
- Runners-up: VCU

A-10 men's soccer seasons
- ← 2022 2024 →

2023 Atlantic 10 Conference men's soccer standings
	Conf.					Overall
Team	W		L		T	W		L		T
VCU	5	–	1	–	2	7	–	6	–	5
Loyola Chicago	4	–	1	–	3	8	–	2	–	5
Saint Louis	4	–	1	–	3	8	–	4	–	5
Davidson	5	–	3	–	0	10	–	5	–	1
Duquesne	4	–	2	–	2	8	–	7	–	3
Dayton ‡	3	–	1	–	4	8	–	7	–	6
UMass	4	–	3	–	1	7	–	6	–	6
Fordham	3	–	3	–	2	6	–	4	–	7
Rhode Island	2	–	4	–	2	5	–	6	–	5
Saint Joseph's	2	–	4	–	2	4	–	11	–	2
St. Bonaventure	2	–	5	–	1	6	–	7	–	4
George Mason	2	–	5	–	1	5	–	7	–	3
George Washington	2	–	5	–	1	4	–	9	–	4
La Salle	1	–	5	–	2	5	–	8	–	4
‡ – 2023 Atlantic 10 tournament champion + – At-large invitation to the 2023 NCAA tournament; As of December 12, 2023; Rankings from United Soccer Coaches; Source: Atlantic 10

The 2023 Atlantic 10 Conference men's soccer season was the 37th season for the Conference fielding men's NCAA Division I men's college soccer. The season culminated with the 2023 Atlantic 10 Conference men's soccer tournament, where the top schools in the conference competed for a guaranteed berth into the 2023 NCAA Division I men's soccer tournament. Dayton won the 2023 conference championship over VCU.

== Regular season ==
VCU finished as the No. 1 seed in the Atlantic 10 after conference regular season play with a 5-1-2 conference record. Loyola Chicago and Saint Louis finished second and third respectively with a 4-1-3 conference record.

== Atlantic 10 tournament ==
Dayton won the 2023 Atlantic 10 soccer conference tournament as the No. 6 seed in the tournament, defeating VCU in the championship game. It was Dayton's first conference championship since 2015.

== Atlantic 10 teams in NCAA tournament ==
Dayton was the only team to qualify for the 2023 NCAA tournament as a result of its autobid from winning the conference championship. In the 2023 NCAA tournament, Dayton lost in the first round to Louisville 4-3.

== See also ==
- Atlantic 10 Conference
- 2023 in American soccer
- 2023 NCAA Division I men's soccer season
