= 2021 Atlantic 10 men's soccer tournament =

2021 Atlantic 10 Conference men's soccer tournament
- Classification: Division I
- Teams: 8
- Matches: 7
- Attendance: 14,880
- Site: Hermann Stadium; Saint Louis, Missouri
- Champions: Saint Louis Billikens (3rd title)
- Winning coach: Kevin Kalish (1st title)
- MVP: Patrick Schulte (Saint Louis Billikens)
- Broadcast: ESPN+
Atlantic 10 Conference men's soccer tournament
| «2020 | 2022» |

2021 Atlantic 10 Conference men's soccer standings
| | Conf. | | | | | Overall |
| Team | W | | L | | T | W | | L | | T |
|---|---|---|---|---|---|---|---|---|---|---|
| No. 7 Saint Louis ‡ | 8 | – | 0 | – | 0 | 16 | – | 1 | – | 4 |
| Rhode Island | 5 | – | 2 | – | 1 | 10 | – | 5 | – | 2 |
| Saint Joseph's | 5 | – | 2 | – | 1 | 8 | – | 9 | – | 2 |
| VCU | 4 | – | 3 | – | 1 | 9 | – | 7 | – | 2 |
| Fordham | 4 | – | 3 | – | 1 | 7 | – | 9 | – | 3 |
| Duquesne | 3 | – | 3 | – | 2 | 10 | – | 7 | – | 2 |
| Davidson | 3 | – | 3 | – | 2 | 9 | – | 7 | – | 2 |
| UMass | 2 | – | 2 | – | 4 | 8 | – | 4 | – | 5 |
| Dayton | 3 | – | 4 | – | 1 | 6 | – | 9 | – | 3 |
| George Washington | 3 | – | 4 | – | 1 | 5 | – | 10 | – | 2 |
| St. Bonaventure | 3 | – | 5 | – | 0 | 4 | – | 10 | – | 1 |
| La Salle | 2 | – | 6 | – | 0 | 6 | – | 10 | – | 0 |
| George Mason | 0 | – | 8 | – | 0 | 2 | – | 13 | – | 1 |
‡ – 2021 Atlantic 10 Tournament champion + – At-large invitation to the 2021 NCAA tournament; As of December 14, 2021; Rankings from United Soccer Coaches; Source: Atlantic 10

The 2021 Atlantic 10 Conference men's soccer tournament was the postseason men's soccer tournament for the Atlantic 10 Conference held from November 6 through November 14, 2021. The quarterfinals of the tournament were held at campus sites, while the semifinals and final took place at Hermann Stadium in Saint Louis, Missouri. The eight-team single-elimination tournament consisted of three rounds based on seeding from regular season conference play. The defending tournament champions were the Fordham Rams. Fordham was unable to defend their title, falling to Saint Louis in the Semifinals. Saint Louis would go on to win the tournament, defeating Duquesne 2–1 in the Final. This was the Billikens' third overall tournament title, and the first for head coach Kevin Kalish. As tournament champions, Saint Louis earned the Atlantic 10's automatic berth into the 2021 NCAA Division I men's soccer tournament.

== Seeding ==
The top eight teams in the regular season earned a spot in the tournament. Teams were seeded based on regular season conference record and tiebreakers were used to determine seedings of teams that finished with the same record. A tiebreaker was required to determine the second and third seeds as Rhode Island and Saint Joseph's finished with identical 5–2–1 records. Rhode Island scored more points against common opponents and therefore earned the second seed, while Saint Joseph's was the third seed. Another tiebreaker was required to determine the fourth and fifth seeds as Fordham and VCU finished with identical 4–3–1 records. Fordham won the regular season matchup between the teams and was therefore the fourth seed, while VCU was the fifth seed. A final tiebreaker was required to determine the sixth and seventh seeds as Duquesne and Davidson finished with identical 3–3–2 records. Duquesne scored more points against common opponents and was awarded the sixth seed, while Davidson would be the seventh seed. Dayton earned the tiebreaker for the eighth seed over UMass and George Washington due to head-to-head results between the three teams.

| Seed | School | Conference Record | Points |
|---|---|---|---|
| 1 | Saint Louis | 8–0–0 | 24 |
| 2 | Rhode Island | 5–2–1 | 16 |
| 3 | Saint Joseph's | 5–2–1 | 16 |
| 4 | Fordham | 4–3–1 | 15 |
| 5 | VCU | 4–3–1 | 15 |
| 6 | Duquesne | 3–3–2 | 11 |
| 7 | Davidson | 3–3–2 | 11 |
| 8 | Dayton | 3-4-1 | 10 |

== Bracket ==
Quarterfinals; Nov. 6-7
1 | Saint Louis | 2
8 | Dayton | 0
4 | Fordham (a.e.t.) | 2
5 | VCU | 1
2 | Rhode Island | 3
7 | Davidson | 1
3 | Saint Joseph's | 1
6 | Duquesne | 2

Semifinals; Friday, Nov. 12
1 | Saint Louis (pen.) | 0 (4)
4 | Fordham | 0 (2)
2 | Rhode Island | 1
6 | Duquesne | 2

Final; Sunday, Nov. 14
1 | Saint Louis | 2
6 | Duquesne | 1

== Schedule ==
=== Quarterfinals ===
| November 6, 2021 | #2 Rhode Island | 3–1 | #7 Davidson | Kingston, RI |
| 7:00 p.m. ET | Patrick Agyemang 31', 68'; Isak Oystese 42'; Cian Purcell (yellow card) 56'; Kevin Castaneda (yellow card) 90' | Report | 47', (yellow card) 83' Luke Bryant; (yellow card) 55' Jack Wilson | Stadium: URI Soccer Complex; Attendance: 1,128; Referee: Lorant Varga; Assistant referees: Scott Kachmarik; Daniel Moreno-Shenk; Fourth official: Thomas Karweh |

| November 6, 2021 | #4 Fordham | 2–1 (a.e.t.) | #5 VCU | Bronx, NY |
| 7:00 p.m. ET | VCU Own Goal 26' (o.g.); Luke McNamara (yellow card) 57'; Florian Deletioglu 101' | Report | (yellow card) 4' (yellow-red card) 97' Team; (yellow card) 21' Celio Pompeu; 49' Jared Valdes; (yellow card) 88' Pablo Varela Fraga; (yellow card) 95' Ethan Manheim | Stadium: Coffey Field; Attendance: 573; Referee: Eric Weisbrod; Assistant referees: Colby Johnson; Dan Caron; Fourth official: Emmanuel Tadonkeng |

| November 6, 2021 | #1 Saint Louis | 2–0 | #8 Dayton | St. Louis, MO |
| 8:00 p.m. CT | A.J. Palazzolo 16'; Chris Bruch 86' | Report | (yellow card) 50' Elias Harryson | Stadium: Hermann Stadium; Attendance: 4,589 |

| November 7, 2021 | #3 Saint Joseph's | 1–2 | #6 Duquesne | Philadelphia, PA |
| 2:00 p.m. ET | Blake Driehuis (yellow card) 56'; Matias Mancini 80', (yellow card) 88'; Alvin Dahn (yellow card) 88' | Report | (yellow card) 56' Eric Zech; 85' Tom Tzabari; 88' Jamie Borjas | Stadium: Sweeney Field; Attendance: 432 |

=== Semifinals ===
| November 12, 2021 | #1 Saint Louis | 0–0 (a.e.t.) (4–2 p) | #4 Fordham | St. Louis, MO |
| Noon CT | | Report | (yellow card) 80' Jacob Bohm | Stadium: Hermann Stadium; Attendance: 3,021; Referee: Calin Radosav; Assistant referees: Jeff Pulley; Colin Pressy; Fourth official: Velimir Milovic |
| | Penalties |
| | Kevin Komodi (penalty scored); A.J. Palazzolo (penalty scored); Mujeeb Murana (penalty scored); Iwan Webster (penalty scored) | | (penalty scored) Jacob Bohm; (penalty scored) Sameer Fathazada; (penalty missed) Luke McNamara; (penalty missed) Matt Sloan |

| November 12, 2021 | #2 Rhode Island | 1–2 | #6 Duquesne | St. Louis, MO |
| 3:00 p.m. CT | Rafa Villanueva 63'; Zach Drayer (yellow card) 65'; Max Kwitchoff (yellow card) 75' | Report | 10' Nate Dragisich; (yellow card) 21' Harper Cook; (yellow card) 26' Tom Tzabari; 59' Zach Mowka; (yellow card) 65' Maxi Hopfer; (yellow card) 76' Jayden Da | Stadium: Hermann Stadium; Attendance: 50 |

=== Final ===
| November 14, 2021 | #1 Saint Louis | 2–1 | #6 Duquesne | St. Louis, MO |
| Noon CT | Simon Becher 25', (yellow card) 83'; Christian Buendia 27'; A.J. Palazzolo (yellow card) 61' | Report | 13' Jayden Da; (yellow card) 49' (yellow-red card) 83' Tom Tzabari; (yellow card) 60' (yellow-red card) 83' Jayden Da; (yellow card) 87' Erich Zech | Stadium: Hermann Stadium; Attendance: 5,087; Referee: Nick Balcer; Assistant referees: George Major; Ramond Mendez; Fourth official: Justin Tomicich |

== Statistics ==
=== Goalscorers ===
There have been 18 goals scored in 7 matches, for an average of 2.57 goals per match (as of November 14, 2021).

2 goals

- Patrick Agyemang – Rhode Island

1 goal

- Luke Bryant – Davidson
- Jamie Borjas – Duquesne
- Jayden Da – Duquesne
- Nate Dragisich – Duquesne
- Zach Mowka – Duquesne
- Tom Tzabari – Duquesne
- Florian Deletioglu – Fordham
- Isak Oystese – Rhode Island
- Rafa Villanueva – Rhode Island
- Matias Mancini – Saint Joseph's
- Simon Becher – Saint Louis
- Chris Bruch – Saint Louis
- Christian Buendia – Saint Louis
- A.J. Palazzolo – Saint Louis
- Jared Valdes – VCU

1 own goal

- VCU (against Fordham)

== All Tournament Team ==
| Player | Team |
|---|---|
| Simon Becher | Saint Louis |
| **Patrick Schulte** | Saint Louis |
| Chandler Vaughn | Saint Louis |
| Chase Niece | Saint Louis |
| John Klein | Saint Louis |
| Mujeeb Murana | Saint Louis |
| Nate Dragisich | Duquesne |
| Ryan Goodhew | Duquesne |
| Patrick Agyemang | Rhode Island |
| Edvin Akselsen | Rhode Island |
| Luke McNamara | Fordham |

MVP in bold
