= 2022 Atlantic 10 men's soccer tournament =

Postseason soccer tournament

2022 Atlantic 10 Conference Men's soccer tournament
- Classification: Division I
- Teams: 8
- Matches: 7
- Site: Campus Sites
- Champions: Saint Louis Billikens (4th title)
- Winning coach: Kevin Kalish (2nd title)
- MVP: Carlos Tofern (Saint Louis Billikens)
- Broadcast: ESPN+
Atlantic 10 Conference Men's soccer tournament
«2021	2023»

2022 Atlantic 10 Conference men's soccer standings
	Conf.					Overall
Team	W		L		T	W		L		T
No. 25 Saint Louis‡	6	–	1	–	1	12	–	5	–	3
Duquesne	4	–	1	–	3	11	–	4	–	4
VCU	3	–	1	–	4	3	–	8	–	6
Dayton	3	–	2	–	3	10	–	2	–	5
Loyola Chicago	3	–	2	–	3	9	–	2	–	7
George Washington	4	–	4	–	0	8	–	8	–	2
UMass	2	–	1	–	5	7	–	4	–	7
La Salle	3	–	3	–	2	5	–	9	–	4
Rhode Island	2	–	2	–	4	6	–	3	–	7
Saint Joseph's	2	–	2	–	4	3	–	6	–	8
Davidson	3	–	4	–	1	6	–	8	–	3
Fordham	1	–	2	–	5	3	–	4	–	9
George Mason	1	–	6	–	1	2	–	11	–	2
St. Bonaventure	0	–	6	–	2	3	–	10	–	3
‡ – 2022 Atlantic 10 Tournament champion + – At-large invitation to the 2022 NCAA Tournament; As of December 13, 2022; Rankings from United Soccer Coaches; Source: Atlantic 10

The 2022 Atlantic 10 men's soccer tournament was the Atlantic 10 men's soccer tournament for the 2022 season. The tournament decided the Atlantic 10 Conference champion for the 2022 season and guaranteed representative into the 2022 NCAA Division I Men's Soccer Tournament. All games in the tournament were played at the campus sites of the higher seeds. The defending champions are Saint Louis.

== Seeding ==
The top eight teams in the regular season earned a spot in the tournament. Teams were seeded based on regular season conference record and tiebreakers were used to determine seedings of teams that finished with the same record. A tiebreaker was required to determine the seventh and eighth seeds as UMass and La Salle finished tied with 11 conference points. La Salle earned the seventh seed over UMass through composite record versus common conference opponents tiebreaker. A three-way tiebreaker was required to determine the fourth, fifth, and sixth seeds between Dayton, Loyola-Chicago, and George Washington, who each earned 12 conference points. Loyola-Chicago earned the fourth seed in the three-way tiebreaker while George Washington and Dayton were awarded the fifth and sixth seeds.

Seed	School	Conference Record	Points
1	Saint Louis	6-1-1	19
2	Duquesne	4-1-3	15
3	VCU	3-1-4	13
4	Loyola-Chicago	3-2-3	12
5	George Washington	4-4	12
6	Dayton	3-2-3	12
7	La Salle	3-4-1	11
8	UMass	2-1-5	11

== Bracket ==
Quarterfinals
Nov. 4-5

Semifinals
Wednesday Nov. 9

Final
Sunday, Nov. 13

1
Saint Louis
1

8
UMass
0

1
Saint Louis (p)
1 (3)

6
Dayton
1 (1)

3
VCU
0

6
Dayton
1

1
Saint Louis

(p)

0 (3)

4
Loyola-Chicago
0 (2)

2
Duquesne
2

7
La Salle
1

2
Duquesne
0

4
Loyola-Chicago
1

4
Loyola-Chicago
1

5
George Washington
0

== All-Tournament team ==
- Carlos Tofern, Saint Louis
- Alberto Suarez, Saint Louis
- Marc Torrellas, Loyola Chicago
- Simon Jillson, Loyola Chicago
- Lane Warrington, Saint Louis
- John Klein, Saint Louis
- CJ Coppola, Saint Louis
- Andrew Mitchell, Loyola Chicago
- Lukas Ender, Loyola Chicago
- Zach Mowka, Duquesne
- Michael Adedokun, Dayton

Source.
