= Aubrey Kebonnetse =

Motswana footballer

Personal information
- Date of birth: 6 February 1990 (age 36)
- Place of birth: Botswana
- Position: Striker

College career
| Years | Team | Apps | (Gls) |
| 2010 | Dayton Flyers | | |

Senior career*
| Years | Team | Apps | (Gls) |
| –2009 | Township Rollers | | |
| 2012–2013 | Township Rollers | | |
| 2014 | TAFIC | | |

International career
| 2010 | Botswana | 1 | (0) |
- * Club domestic league appearances and goals

Aubrey Kebonnetse (born 6 February 1990) is a Motswana former footballer who played as a striker for Dayton Flyers.

== Career ==
Kebbonetse was regarded as a Botswana prospect, having been regarded as a good performer for the Botswana youth national teams. He was tipped to become one of the best strikers in Botswana football history. He was previously captain of the Botswana Under-20 team.

Kebonnetse started his career with Botswanan side Township Rollers, where he was regarded as one of their most important players. Before the 2010 season, Kebonnetse joined the Dayton Flyers in the United States, where he suffered a knee injury.

== Style of play ==
Kebonnetse mainly operated as a striker and was known for his ability to score high quality, "classic" goals.
