= 2023 Atlantic 10 Conference men's soccer tournament =

Postseason soccer tournament

2023 Atlantic 10 men's soccer tournament
- Classification: Division I
- Teams: 8
- Matches: 7
- Attendance: 4,756
- Site: Campus Sites
- Champions: Dayton (5th title)
- Winning coach: Dennis Currier (5th title)
- MVP: Kenji Mboma Dem (Dayton)
- Broadcast: ESPN+

2023 Atlantic 10 Conference men's soccer standings
	Conf.					Overall
Team	W		L		T	W		L		T
VCU	5	–	1	–	2	7	–	6	–	5
Loyola Chicago	4	–	1	–	3	8	–	2	–	5
Saint Louis	4	–	1	–	3	8	–	4	–	5
Davidson	5	–	3	–	0	10	–	5	–	1
Duquesne	4	–	2	–	2	8	–	7	–	3
Dayton ‡	3	–	1	–	4	8	–	7	–	6
UMass	4	–	3	–	1	7	–	6	–	6
Fordham	3	–	3	–	2	6	–	4	–	7
Rhode Island	2	–	4	–	2	5	–	6	–	5
Saint Joseph's	2	–	4	–	2	4	–	11	–	2
St. Bonaventure	2	–	5	–	1	6	–	7	–	4
George Mason	2	–	5	–	1	5	–	7	–	3
George Washington	2	–	5	–	1	4	–	9	–	4
La Salle	1	–	5	–	2	5	–	8	–	4
‡ – 2023 Atlantic 10 tournament champion + – At-large invitation to the 2023 NCAA tournament; As of December 12, 2023; Rankings from United Soccer Coaches; Source: Atlantic 10

The 2023 Atlantic 10 men's soccer tournament was the post season men's soccer tournament for the Atlantic 10 Conference held from November 4 to November 12, 2023. The seven-match tournament took place at campus sites, with the higher seed hosting. The eight-team single-elimination tournament consisted of three rounds based on seeding from regular season conference play. The defending champions were the Saint Louis Billikens. Saint Louis was the second seed, but was unable to defend their title as they fell to seventh seed UMass in the Quarterfinals in a penalty shoot-out. Sixth seed Dayton went on to win the tournament, defeating first seed VCU 2–1 in the Final. This was Dayton's fifth tournament title, and first since 2015. All five of Datyon's titles have come under head coach Dennis Currier. As tournament champions Dayton earned the A10's automatic berth into the 2023 NCAA Division I men's soccer tournament.

== Seeding ==
The top eight teams in the regular season earned a spot in the tournament. Teams were seeded based on regular season conference record and tiebreakers were used to determine seedings of teams that finished with the same record. A three-way tiebreaker was required for the second, third, and fourth seeds as Davidson, Loyola Chicago, and Saint Louis all finished with fifteen conference points. Record against common conference opponents was used as the tiebreaker. Saint Louis had the best record in that regard and was the second seed. They were followed by Loyola Chicago as the third seed and Davidson as the fourth seed. A second tiebreaker was required to determine the sixth and seventh seeds as Dayton and UMass both finished with thirteen points. Dayton earned the sixth seed by virtue of their 3–1 win in the head-to-head match up during the regular season.

Seed	School	Conference Record	Points
1	VCU	5–1–2	17
2	Saint Louis	4–1–3	15
3	Loyola Chicago	4–1–3	15
4	Davidson	5–3–0	15
5	Duquesne	4–2–2	14
6	Dayton	3–1–4	13
7	UMass	4–3–1	13
8	Fordham	3–3–2	11

== Bracket ==
Quarterfinals; Nov. 3-4
1	VCU	1
8	Fordham	0
3	Loyola Chicago	2 (4)
6	Dayton (pen.)	2 (5)
(Pairings are reseeded after the first round)
2	Saint Louis	2 (3)
7	UMass (pen.)	2 (4)
4	Davidson	2
5	Duquesne	1

Semifinals; Wednesday Nov. 8
1	VCU	3
7	UMass	1
4	Davidson	1
6	Dayton	3

Final; Sunday, Nov. 12
1	VCU	1
6	Dayton	2

== Schedule ==
=== First Round ===
November 3	#1 VCU	1–0	#8 Fordham	Richmond, VA
7:00 p.m. ET	Damian Gallegos 74'	Report		Stadium: Sports Backers Stadium; Attendance: 483; Referee: Shaun Papperman; Assistant referees: Jeffery Skinker; Nick Karnovsky; Fourth official: Justin Weinstock

November 3	#4 Davidson	2–1	#5 Duquesne	Davidson, NC
7:00 p.m. ET	Denis Krioutchenkov 11'; Alonzo Clarke (yellow card) 15'; Lyman Ott (yellow card) 39'; Vincent Bennage 78'	Report	(yellow card) 11' Cameron Territo; (yellow card) 18' Christoffer Vie Angell; 37' Ask Ekeland; (yellow card) 84' Team	Stadium: Alumni Stadium; Attendance: 831

November 3	#2 Saint Louis	2–2 (a.e.t.) (3–4 p)	#7 UMass	St. Louis, MO
7:00 p.m. CT	Mads Stistrup Petersen 56', 66'	Report	48' Alec Hughes; 75' Nick Zielonka; (yellow card) 108' Sefunmi Taiwo	Stadium: Hermann Stadium; Attendance: 854; Referee: Eulogio Villalpando; Assistant referees: Leszek Skowyra; Stephen Valle; Fourth official: George Major
	Penalties
	Kevin Komodi (penalty missed); Jeremi Abonnel (penalty scored); Diego Konincks (penalty scored); Christian Buendia (penalty scored); Jack Sullivan (penalty missed); Mathew Wrobel (penalty missed)		(penalty scored) Alec Hughes; (penalty scored) Michael Rojas; (penalty scored) Nick Zielonka; (penalty missed) Aidan Kelly; (penalty missed) Jack Englebert; (penalty scored) Andrew Ortiz

November 4	#3 Loyola Chicago	2–2 (a.e.t.) (4–5 p)	#6 Dayton	Chicago, IL
3:00 p.m. CT	Marc Torrellas 30'; Julian Cisneros 54', (yellow card) 60'	Report	52' Sidike Jabateh; (yellow card) 54' Paul Yeboah; 59' Manny Day; (yellow card) 84' Hjalti Sigurdsson; (yellow card) 89' Casper Svendby	Stadium: Loyola Soccer Park; Attendance: 438; Referee: Dimitrios Katsimingos; Assistant referees: Sergio Alverez; Sina Kashef; Fourth official: Michael Kennedy
	Penalties
	Markus Maurer (penalty scored); Oscar Dueso (penalty scored); Juilan Cisneros (penalty scored); Marc Torrellas (penalty missed); Quinten Blair (penalty scored)		(penalty scored) Dario Caetano; (penalty scored) Ousseynou Cisse; (penalty scored) Sidike Jabateh; (penalty scored) Casper Svendby; (penalty scored) Logan Brown

=== Semifinals ===
November 8	#1 VCU	3–1	#7 UMass	Richmond, VA
7:00 p.m. ET	UMass Own Goal 41'; Andrey Salmeron 45'; William Hitchcock 57'	Report	11', (yellow card) 85' Michael Rojas; (yellow card) 44' Shane Velez; (yellow card) 68' Andrew Ortiz	Stadium: Sports Backers Stadium; Attendance: 437; Referee: Mike De Felice; Assistant referees: Jeffrey Skinker; Aaron Hormuth; Fourth official: Mark Remsa

November 8	#4 Davidson	1–3	#6 Dayton	Davidson, NC
7:00 p.m. ET	Denis Krioutchenkov 58'	Report	11' Manny Day; (yellow card) 19' Hjalti Sigurdsson; (yellow card) 44' Braden Seel; 49', 63' Kenji Mboma Dem; (yellow card) 58' Paul Yeboah; (yellow card) 67' Paul Yeboah	Stadium: Alumni Stadium; Attendance: 912

=== Final ===
November 12	#1 VCU	1–2	#6 Dayton	Richmond, VA
12:00 p.m. ET	Jonathan Kanagwa 10'; Scott McLeod (yellow card) 75'	Report	69' Kenji Mboma Dem; (yellow card) 75' Sidike Jabateh; (yellow card) 84' Adam Zenzen; 89' Hjalti Sigurdsson; (yellow card) 89' Miles Bonham	Stadium: Sports Backers Stadium; Attendance: 801; Referee: Gregory DeMello; Assistant referees: Ben Pilgrim; George Vergara Jr. Fourth official: Kohl Peasley

== Statistics ==
=== Goalscorers ===
There were 23 goals scored in 7 matches, for an average of 3.29 goals per match (as of November 12, 2023).

3 goals

- Kenji Mboma Dem – Dayton

2 goals

- Denis Krioutchenkov – Davidson
- Manny Day – Dayton
- Mads Stistrup Petersen – Saint Louis

1 goal

- Vincent Bennage – Davidson
- Sidike Jabateh – Dayton
- Hjalti Sigurdsson – Dayton
- Ask Ekeland – Duquesne
- Julian Cisneros – Loyola Chicago
- Marc Torrellas – Loyola Chicago
- Alec Hughes – UMass
- Michael Rojas – UMass
- Nick Zielonka – UMass
- Damian Gallegos – VCU
- William Hitchcock – VCU
- Jonathan Kanagwa – VCU
- Andrey Salmeron – VCU

1 own goal

- UMass (vs. VCU)

== All-Tournament team ==
Player	Team
**2023 Atlantic 10 Men's Soccer All-Tournament team**
Denis Krioutchenkov	Davidson
Logan Brown	Dayton
Dario Caetano	Dayton
Manny Day	Dayton
**Kenji Mboma Dem**	Dayton
Hjalti Sigurdsson	Dayton
Jonathan Kanagwa	VCU
Moussa Ndiaye	VCU
Andrey Salmeron	VCU
Papa Toure	VCU
Michael Rojas	UMass

MVP in Bold
