= Jake Ouimet =

American soccer player and coach

Personal information
- Date of birth: February 10, 1973 (age 53)
- Place of birth: Hatfield, Massachusetts, U.S.
- Position: Striker

Youth career
- 1992–1996: University of Maine

Senior career*
Years	Team	Apps	(Gls)
1997–1998	Worcester Wildfire		
1998–1999	Cape Cod Crusaders		

Managerial career
- 1997–1998: W.T. Woodson High School (assistant)
- 1999–2005: George Washington University (assistant)
- 2006–2012: Duquesne University
- 2013–present: George Washington University (associate head coach)
- * Club domestic league appearances and goals

Jake Ouimet (born February 10, 1973) is an American former professional soccer player and collegiate soccer coach.

He attended the University of Maine from 1992 to 1996, where he became a standout soccer player. In 1992, he won North Atlantic Rookie of the Year honors. He remains the school's all-time leader in goals and points scored, and has earned three all-American selections. He graduated with a degree in business administration in 1996.

He moved onto the professional ranks, and initially played for the Worcester Wildfire of the A-League during the 1997–1998 soccer season. He was the team leader in both points and goals, and was named to the A-League team of the week on July 20, 1997. During the 1998 to 1999 soccer season, he moved to the Cape Cod Crusaders of the United States Indoor Soccer League. He once again led his team in points and goals scored, and was named USISL Player of the Week on July 8, 1998.

During this time, he started his coaching career. He began his career as an assistant of the men's soccer team at W.T. Woodson High School in Fairfax, Virginia. He coached there for 2 seasons, before moving on to George Washington University. As an assistant under coach George Lidster, he coached the Colonials from 1999 to 2005. In 2006, he was named head men's soccer coach at Duquesne University, a position he held until resigning Dec 23, 2012.
