= Matt Spear =

American soccer player and coach

Personal information
- Full name: Matthew Spear
- Date of birth: December 2, 1970 (age 55)
- Place of birth: Winston-Salem, North Carolina, United States

College career
Years	Team	Apps	(Gls)
1988–1992	Davidson Wildcats		

Managerial career
- 1993–2000: Davidson Wildcats (assistant)
- 2001–2018: Davidson Wildcats
- 2019–2020: Richmond Kickers (president)

Matthew Spear (born December 2, 1970, in Winston-Salem, North Carolina) is an American former soccer coach who is currently the President of the Richmond Kickers.

Spear attended Davidson College where he was a four-year starter (1988–1992) on the men's soccer team. He was captain of the 1992 squad that won the Southern Conference championship.

In 1993, Spear became an assistant coach at Davidson, moving up to head coach in 2000 when longtime head coach Charlie Slagle retired. In 2003, he took the Wildcats to a 15–6–2 record and an NCAA post-season berth. He was a Southern Conference Coach of the Year and has compiled an 85–84–11 record. On December 6, 2018, Spear stepped down as Davidson's men's soccer coach to be named President of the Richmond Kickers. Spear overlooked the Kickers during their 2019 and 2020 seasons. Following the 2020 season, Spear stepped down citing family reasons.
