= Dave Giffard =

American soccer coach (born 1975)

David Giffard
Current position
- Title: Head coach
- Team: VCU Rams
- Conference: Atlantic 10 Conference

Biographical details
- Born: August 29, 1975 (age 51)
- Education: MacMurray College

Playing career
- 1993–1997: MacMurray Highlanders

Coaching career (HC unless noted)
- 1998–1999: MacMurray Highlanders (assistant)
- 1999–2000: Westminster Blue Jays (assistant)
- 2000–2004: UAB Blazers (goalkeeper)
- 2005–2006: Indiana Hoosiers (assistant)
- 2007–2009: Akron Zips (assistant)
- 2010–2026: VCU Rams

Head coaching record
- Overall: 86–64–28 (.562)

Accomplishments and honors

Championships
- Atlantic 10 Regular Season (2018)

Dave Giffard (born August 29, 1975) is an American soccer coach.

== Career ==
Giffard was raised in Illinois, where he attended MacMurray College from 1993 to 1997, and played for the school's soccer team as a goalkeeper. After finishing college at MacMurray, with a Bachelor's degree in physical education, Giffard immediately went into the sport as a coach, coaching at various institutions as an assistant coach or goalkeeping coach for the next 15 years. Following his tenure as an assistant at MacMurray, Giffard was an assistant on the Westminster College Blue Jays, where they achieved their first 12-win season in program history. During his final years at Westminster, Giffard enrolled for postgraduate studies at the University of Alabama at Birmingham (UAB).

While at UAB, Giffard earned his Master of Arts in Education, achieving his master's at the end of the 2002–03 academic year. Following his achievement, Giffard joined the UAB Blazers men's soccer program as an assistant to Mike Getman. At UAB, Giffard primarily worked as a goalkeeping coach. During his time at UAB, Clint Baumstark became the first goalkeeper at UAB to be capped by the United States U-20 national soccer team.

Upon leaving UAB, Giffard served as volunteer for Indiana University before joining Caleb Porter and the Akron Zips men's soccer program. During Giffard's time as an assistant to Porter, the Zips had a 23–1–1 season, and won the 2010 NCAA Division I Men's Soccer Championship, beating Louisville.

Starting in 2010, Giffard earned his first head coaching position in his career, becoming the head coach for the VCU Rams men's soccer program. In his three years, Giffard returned the Rams to the NCAA Tournament for the first time since 2004, and had the team nationally ranked for the first time since 2005.

Following the 2026 season, Giffard announced his retirement from coaching.

== Head coaching record ==
Record table
Season	Team	Overall	Conference	Standing	Postseason
VCU (Colonial Athletic Association) (2010–2011)
2010	VCU	8–5–6	5–2–4	2nd	CAA Semifinals
2011	VCU	11–9–0	6–5–0	T–6th	
VCU (Atlantic 10 Conference) (2012–present)
2012	VCU	12–3–5	6–1–2	4th	A-10 Runners-up; NCAA Second Round
2013	VCU	11–8–2	5–2–1	3rd	A-10 Semifinals; NCAA First Round
2014	VCU	7–8–5	4–1–3	3rd	A-10 Quarterfinals
2015	VCU	7–10–4	3–2–3	8th	A-10 Runners-up
2016	VCU	8–9–4	4–3–1	5th	A-10 Runners-up
2017	VCU	12–7–0	6–2–0	2nd	A-10 Runners-up; NCAA Second Round
2018	VCU	10–6–2	6–1–1	1st	A-10 Semifinals
2019	VCU	0–0–0	0–0–0	—	—
VCU:		86–64–28 (.562)	45–19–11 (.673)		
Total:		86–64–28 (.562)			
National champion Postseason invitational champion Conference regular season champion Conference regular season and conference tournament champion Division regular season champion Division regular season and conference tournament champion Conference tournament champion

== Honors ==
- 2× Atlantic 10 Conference Men's Soccer Coach of the Year: 2018, 2023
