= Mike Babst =

American soccer player and coach

Current position
- Title: Head coach
- Team: Davidson Wildcats
- Conference: Atlantic 10
- Record: 87–23–12

Biographical details
- Born: September 18, 1976 (age 50); Pittsburgh, Pennsylvania
- Education: Boston College

Playing career
- 1999–2002: Boston College Eagles

Coaching career (HC unless noted)
- 2002–2004: Washington and Lee Generals (AC)
- 2005–2007: Duquesne Dukes (AC)
- 2007–2012: South Carolina Gamecocks (AC)
- 2012–2013: Northwestern Wildcats (AC)
- 2013–2018: Chicago Maroons
- 2019–: Davidson Wildcats

Michael Babst (born 1977) is an American former soccer player and who is currently the head coach of the Davidson Wildcats men's soccer program. Babst was previously a head coach for the men's program at the University of Chicago.

== Career ==
Babst was an assistant coach at numerous schools, including Duquesne and South Carolina. In 2013, Babst was hired to be the head coach at the University of Chicago, where he led the team to the Division III national semifinals in both 2017 and 2018. On January 17, 2019, it was announced that Babst had accepted the head coaching job at Davidson College, making him the seventh head coach in program history.
