= Sam Koch (soccer) =

American soccer coach (1955–2014)

Personal information
- Full name: Samuel Chamberlain Koch
- Date of birth: January 3, 1955
- Place of birth: Boston, Massachusetts, U.S.
- Date of death: July 20, 2014 (aged 59)
- Place of death: Hadley, Massachusetts, U.S.

College career
Years	Team	Apps	(Gls)
1975–1979	Colby Mules		

Managerial career
- 1979–1982: Brown Bears (assistant)
- 1983–1984: Boston College Eagles (assistant)
- 1984–1989: Stanford Cardinal
- 1991–2013: UMass Minutemen

Samuel Chamberlain Koch (January 3, 1955 – July 20, 2014) was an American soccer coach. He served as the head coach for the Stanford Cardinal men's soccer team from 1984 to 1989, and for the UMass Minutemen men's soccer team from 1991 to 2013.

== Coaching career ==
Koch started his coaching career as an assistant at Brown University and Boston College. From 1984 to 1989, he served as the head coach for the Stanford Cardinal men's soccer team, with a record of 58–53–16. From 1991 to 2013, he served as the head coach of the UMass Minutemen men's soccer team, with a record of 222–182–45. He led his team to the NCAA tournament three times (2001, 2007 and 2008), including an appearance in the NCAA College Cup Semifinals in 2007. At the end of his tenure at UMass, he was UMass's "winningest men's soccer coach" with a total of 222 career wins.

== Personal life ==
Koch was born to Albert Carl Koch Jr. and Frances Jean Emery Koch in Boston, Massachusetts on January 3, 1955. He attended Concord-Carlisle High School and Northfield Mount Hermon School. After high school, he attended Colby College, where he played on the varsity soccer team, and graduated in 1979 with degrees in History and Environmental Studies. His support of Colby soccer was honored with the creation of the "Sam Koch Award" at Colby College. He was married to Suzanne Patterson, with whom he had four children. He died of sinus cancer on July 20, 2014, at his home in Hadley, Massachusetts.
