= Craig Jones (footballer, born 1977) =

Welsh footballer and manager

Current position
- Title: Head coach
- Team: George Washington Revolutionaries
- Conference: Atlantic 10

Biographical details
- Born: 1976 (age 49–50)
- Education: George Washington

Playing career
- 1995–1998: George Washington
- Position: MF

Coaching career (HC unless noted)
- 2002–2010: George Washington (assistant)
- 2011–: George Washington

Head coaching record
- Overall: 48–61–14

Accomplishments and honors

Championships
- 2 Atlantic 10 Regular Season (2011, 2015)

Craig Jones (born 1976) is a Welsh former footballer who currently serves as the manager for the George Washington Revolutionaries men's soccer program. Jones played college soccer for George Washington, and served as an assistant manager for George Washington.

== Career ==
=== Player ===
Jones was also a four-year letterwinner for George Washington from 1995 until 1998.

=== Coaching ===
Jones served as George Washington's head assistant manager for three seasons: 2009 through 2011. He served as George Washington's volunteer assistant from 2002 until 2008.

He has coached the team as the main manager since 2011.
