= Chase Brooks =

American soccer player and coach

Current position
- Title: Head coach
- Team: Duquesne
- Conference: A-10

Biographical details
- Born: Fort Myers, Florida

Playing career
- 1999–2003: Eckerd

Coaching career (HC unless noted)
- 2003–2004: Eckerd (assistant)
- 2004–2006: Northern Illinois (assistant)
- 2006–2011: Dayton (assistant)
- 2011–2012: Niagara
- 2013–present: Duquesne

Chase Brooks is a head coach and a former soccer player. He holds a USSF "B" License

== Player ==
Brooks played college soccer for the Eckerd Tritons from the 1999–2000 season to the 2002–03 season. He served as captain during his last two seasons, and was three-times Sunshine State Conference Honor Roll athlete and a First-Team All-Sunshine Conference player his senior year.

== Coach ==
Brooks coached the Eckerd Tritons from May 2003 until May 2004.

In 2011, he was hired as head coach for the Niagara Purple Eagles men's soccer team.

In 2013, he was hired by the Duquesne Dukes.
