= George Lidster =

American soccer coach

George Lidster is the former head men's soccer coach at George Washington University. He held that position from 1987–1996 and 1998–2011, and posted a 188-175-49 record in 22 seasons, making him the all-time winningest coach in school history. Additionally he has compiled an 89-75-23 record in Atlantic 10 conference play, and has won 2 Atlantic 10 tournament titles, and made 3 NCAA tournament appearances.

His teams have made the NCAA tournament in 1989, 2002, and 2004. In 1989, he led the George Washington Colonials to the "Sweet Sixteen" finals of the NCAA Division I Men's Soccer Championship, and a school record 14 victories. His 2004 team reached the tournament, after starting the season 1-8-3, and posted a 1–0 upset over North Carolina in the NCAA tournament.
