= Dennis Currier =

American college soccer head coach

Current position
- Title: Head coach
- Team: Dayton
- Conference: A-10

Playing career
- 1989–1992: Southern Miss
- Position: Defender

Coaching career (HC unless noted)
- 1993–2000: Harris–Stowe State
- 2001–2004: Incarnate Word
- 2005–present: Dayton

Dennis Currier is an American college soccer head coach. He currently serves as the head men's soccer coach at the University of Dayton. He has held that position since 2005, and has posted a 56–26–15 record in five seasons. From 2001 to 2004, he was the head men's soccer coach at Incarnate Word, compiling a 62–15–7 record in four seasons. After guiding the 2001 team to a 12–8–1 record, he posted a 50–7–6 record over his final three seasons there. The team won four conference championships in four years, and advanced to the NCAAs the last three seasons there.

From 1993 to 2000, he coached at Harris–Stowe State University. He went 126–34–5 there, and enjoyed remarkably consistent success, winning 14 games every season, and never losing more than 5 in a season. He earned three Regional Coach of the Year accolades while at HSSU. His career coaching record stands at 230–71–26.
