= Ryo Shimazaki =

Japanese footballer (born 1997)

Ryo Shimazaki 島崎 竜
Personal information
- Full name: Ryo Shimazaki
- Date of birth: April 19, 1997 (age 29)
- Place of birth: Kawasaki, Japan
- Height: 5 ft 9 in (1.75 m)
- Position: Defender

Youth career
- 2008–2016: Kawasaki Frontale

College career
| Years | Team | Apps | (Gls) |
| 2016–2019 | VCU Rams | 69 | (7) |

Senior career*
| Years | Team | Apps | (Gls) |
| 2018 | Portland Timbers U23s | 8 | (0) |
| 2019 | Tormenta FC 2 | 8 | (0) |
| 2020 | New England Revolution II | 7 | (1) |

International career
- Japan U16
- Japan U17
- * Club domestic league appearances and goals as of 25 October 2020

Ryo Shimazaki (島崎 竜, Shimazaki Ryō; born 19 April 1997) is a Japanese former professional footballer who played as a defender.

== Career ==
=== Youth ===
Shimazaki spent eight years with the Kawasaki Frontale academy.

=== College & MLS SuperDraft ===
Shimazaki opted to move to the United States to play college soccer at Virginia Commonwealth University in 2016, where he played for four years, making a total of 69 appearances, scoring seven goals and tallying six assists for the Rams.

While at college, Shimazaki appeared for USL League Two sides Portland Timbers U23s in 2018, and with Tormenta FC 2 in 2019.

On 13 January 2020, Shimazaki was selected 59th overall in the 2020 MLS SuperDraft by Columbus Crew SC.

=== Professional ===
On 16 January 2020, Shimazaki joined New England Revolution II ahead of the 2020 season. He made his professional debut on 25 July 2020, appearing as a half-time substitute against Union Omaha. He scored his first goal on 26 August 2020, scoring the game's only goal in a 1–0 win over Greenville Triumph. Shimazaki's contract option was declined by New England on 30 November 2020.

On 29 August 2021, Shimozaki announced his retirement from professional soccer.

=== International ===
Shimazaki has represented Japan at under-16 and under-17 level.
