= Duquesne Dukes men's soccer =

American college soccer team

- Founded: 1995
- University: Duquesne University
- Head coach: Chase Brooks (11th season)
- Conference: A-10
- Location: Pittsburgh, Pennsylvania, US
- Stadium: Rooney Field (capacity: 2,200)
- Nickname: Dukes
- Colors: Red and blue
| Home | Away |

Conference regular season championships
- 2003, 2004, 2005

The Duquesne Dukes men's soccer team is a varsity intercollegiate athletic team of Duquesne University in Pittsburgh, United States. The team is a member of the Atlantic 10 Conference, which is part of the National Collegiate Athletic Association's Division I. Duquesne's first men's soccer team was fielded in 1995. The team plays its home games at Rooney Field in Pittsburgh. The Dukes are coached by Chase Brooks.

== Seasons ==
| National champions † | Conference champions * | Division champions ‡ | NCAA Tournament berth ^ |

| Season | Head coach | Conference | Season results | | | | | | | Tournament results | |
| Season | Head coach | Conference | Overall | | | Conference | | | | A-10 | NCAA |
| Season | Head coach | Conference | W | L | T | W | L | T | Finish | A-10 | NCAA |
|---|---|---|---|---|---|---|---|---|---|---|---|
| 1995 | Dave Kasper | Atlantic 10 | 3 | 13 | 2 | 2 | 7 | 2 | T-10th | — | — |
| 1996 | Dave Kasper | Atlantic 10 | 5 | 8 | 3 | 2 | 6 | 2 | 9th | — | — |
| 1997 | Dave Kasper | Atlantic 10 | 7 | 10 | 2 | 3 | 8 | 0 | T-10th | — | — |
| 1998 | Wade Jean | Atlantic 10 | 3 | 13 | 1 | 2 | 9 | 0 | 11th | — | — |
| 1999 | Wade Jean | Atlantic 10 | 13 | 6 | 2 | 9 | 2 | 0 | 2nd | Final | — |
| 2000 | Wade Jean | Atlantic 10 | 7 | 10 | 2 | 4 | 5 | 1 | 5th | — | — |
| 2001 | Wade Jean | Atlantic 10 | 7 | 8 | 1 | 4 | 7 | 0 | 9th | — | — |
| 2002 | Wade Jean | Atlantic 10 | 13 | 3 | 5 | 7 | 1 | 3 | 2nd | Final | — |
| 2003* | Wade Jean | Atlantic 10 | 13 | 3 | 3 | 8 | 2 | 1 | T-1st* | Semifinals | — |
| 2004* | Wade Jean | Atlantic 10 | 13 | 6 | 1 | 9 | 2 | 0 | T-1st* | Semifinals | — |
| 2005* | Wade Jean | Atlantic 10 | 13 | 5 | 0 | 7 | 2 | 1 | T-1st* | Semifinals | — |
| 2006 | Jake Ouimet | Atlantic 10 | 11 | 7 | 2 | 6 | 3 | 0 | 4th | Semifinals | — |
| 2007 | Jake Ouimet | Atlantic 10 | 5 | 11 | 3 | 3 | 6 | 0 | 12th | — | — |
| 2008 | Jake Ouimet | Atlantic 10 | 5 | 10 | 4 | 1 | 7 | 1 | 13th | — | — |
| 2009 | Jake Ouimet | Atlantic 10 | 9 | 7 | 2 | 4 | 4 | 1 | T-7th | — | — |
| 2010 | Jake Ouimet | Atlantic 10 | 8 | 7 | 3 | 4 | 4 | 1 | 9th | — | — |
| 2011 | Jake Ouimet | Atlantic 10 | 7 | 9 | 2 | 4 | 4 | 1 | T-7th | — | — |
| 2012 | Jake Ouimet | Atlantic 10 | 7 | 12 | 1 | 4 | 4 | 1 | T-7th | Quarterfinals | — |
| 2013 | Chase Brooks | Atlantic 10 | 9 | 8 | 1 | 4 | 3 | 1 | 6th | Quarterfinals | — |
| 2014 | Chase Brooks | Atlantic 10 | 8 | 7 | 3 | 3 | 4 | 1 | 9th | — | — |
| 2015 | Chase Brooks | Atlantic 10 | 6 | 10 | 2 | 4 | 3 | 1 | T-4th | Quarterfinals | — |
| 2016 | Chase Brooks | Atlantic 10 | 8 | 5 | 5 | 3 | 2 | 3 | T-6th | Quarterfinals | — |
| 2017 | Chase Brooks | Atlantic 10 | 3 | 13 | 1 | 1 | 7 | 0 | 12th | — | — |
| 2018 | Chase Brooks | Atlantic 10 | 4 | 9 | 3 | 2 | 4 | 2 | 11th | — | — |
| 2019 | Chase Brooks | Atlantic 10 | 8 | 8 | 1 | 3 | 5 | 0 | T-7th | — | — |
| 2020 | Chase Brooks | Atlantic 10 | 2 | 5 | 0 | 2 | 4 | 0 | 3rd in West | — | — |
| 2021 | Chase Brooks | Atlantic 10 | 10 | 7 | 2 | 3 | 3 | 2 | T6th | Final | — |
| 2022 | Chase Brooks | Atlantic 10 | 11 | 4 | 4 | 4 | 1 | 3 | 2nd | Semifinals | — |
| 2023 | Chase Brooks | Atlantic 10 | 8 | 7 | 3 | 4 | 2 | 2 | 5th | Quarterfinals | — |
| 2024 | Chase Brooks | Atlantic 10 | 11 | 4 | 2 | 5 | 2 | 1 | T-3rd | Quarterfinals | — |

== 1995 inaugural season team history ==
First Game, NCAA Division-1 Men's Soccer: Saturday, September 2, 1995, vs. James Madison University, at JMU Sheraton Inn Invitational (L, 4–1).

First Loss: Saturday, September 2, 1995, vs. James Madison University, at JMU Sheraton Inn Invitational (L, 4–1).

First Goal: Charlie Roberts, September 2, 1995, vs. James Madison University, at JMU Sheraton Inn Invitational (L, 4–1).

First Assist: Anthony Gallo JR, September 2, 1995, vs. James Madison University, at JMU Sheraton Inn Invitational (L, 4–1).

First Win: Sunday, September 24, 1995, vs. Niagara University, at Arthur J. Rooney Field, Pittsburgh, PA (W, 8–1).

First Win (GK): Jarrod Duffy, September 24, 1995, vs. Niagara University, at Arthur J. Rooney Field, Pittsburgh, PA (W, 8–1).
