= Dayton Flyers men's soccer =

American college soccer team

- Founded: 1956; 70 years ago
- University: University of Dayton
- Head coach: Dennis Currier (19th season)
- Conference: Atlantic 10
- Location: Dayton, Ohio, US
- Stadium: Baujan Field (capacity: 3,000)
- Nickname: Flyers
- Colors: Red and blue
Home	Away

NCAA tournament Round of 16
- 2024

NCAA tournament Round of 32
- 2015, 2024

NCAA tournament appearances
- 1997, 1998, 2008, 2015, 2023, 2024

Conference tournament championships
- 1997, 1998, 2008, 2015, 2023, 2024

Conference regular season championships
- 1998, 2000, 2009, 2020

For information on all University of Dayton sports, see Dayton Flyers

The Dayton Flyers men's soccer team is a varsity intercollegiate athletic team of University of Dayton in Dayton, Ohio, United States. The team is a member of the Atlantic 10 Conference, which is part of the National Collegiate Athletic Association's Division I. Dayton's first men's soccer team was fielded in 1956. The team plays its home games at Baujan Field in Dayton, Ohio. The Flyers are coached by Dennis Currier.

== Current squad ==
As of 2024

Note: Flags indicate national team as defined under FIFA eligibility rules; some limited exceptions apply. Players may hold more than one non-FIFA nationality.

No.	Pos.	Nation	Player
—	GK	POR	Dario Caetano
—	GK	CAN	Marc Kouadio
—	DF	SWE	Elias Hauptmann Harryson
—	DF	BIH	Milan Miric
—	DF	ISL	Hjalti Sigurdsson
—	MF	PUR	Adrián Biaggi
—	MF	SWE	Adam Zenzén
—	MF	NOR	Martin Bakken
—	MF	USA	Cooper Lijewski

== Seasons ==
Record table
Season	Coach	Overall	Conference	Standing	Postseason
Independent (1956–1987)
1956	Pat Smith	2–3–0			
1957	Pat Smith	6–1–0			
1958	Paul Scheurmann	6–2–0			
1959	Paul Scheurmann	1–8–0			
1960	John Wiesler	1–5–2			
1961	John Wiesler	4–5–0			
1962	John Wiesler	1–7–0			
1963	John Wiesler	2–5–1			
1964	John Schleppi	4–4–0			
1965	John Schleppi	3–5–1			
1966	Bernie Harawa	6–1–1			
1967	John Schleppi	8–2–1			
1968	John Schleppi	9–1–1			
1969	Pat O'Hanlon	6–4–1			
1970	Pat O'Hanlon	6–4–1			
1971	Bob McNamee	8–2–0			
1972	Bob McNamee	10–1–1			
1973	Bob Richardson	6–2–2			
1974	Bob Richardson	7–3–3			
1975	Bob Richardson	11–3–0			
1976	Bob Richardson	11–3–0			
1977	Bob Richardson	6–9–1			
1978	Bob Richardson	5–11–2			
1979	Bob Richardson	6–12–0			
1980	Jerry Butcher	8–7–3			
1981	Jerry Butcher	7–11–1			
1982	Jerry Butcher	10–6–0			
1983	Jerry Butcher	8–6–3			
1984	Pete Hayes	4–9–1			
1985	Pete Hayes	3–14–1			
1986	Pete Hayes	7–10–0			
1987	Roger Creed	12–10–0			
Midwestern Collegiate Conference (1988–1992)
1988	Roy Craig	7–15–0	2–4–0	6th	
1989	Roy Craig	8–13–1	1–5–0	T-5th	
1990	Roy Craig	11–7–4	4–2–1	5th	
1991	Roy Craig	9–11–1	2–4–0	T-4th	
1992	Roy Craig	7–9–2	4–2–1	T-3rd	
Great Midwest Conference (1993–1994)
1993	Roy Craig	10–9–1	2–3–1		
1994	Roy Craig	8–12–0	2–7–0		
Atlantic 10 Conference (1995–present)
1995	Roy Craig	5–12–1	2–8–1	12th	
1996	Dwayne Shaffer	7–10–1	6–5–0	7th	
1997	Jim Launder	12–8–1	7–4–0	T–3rd	A-10 Champions; NCAA Play-in
1998	Jim Launder	13–8–0	9–2–0	1st	A-10 Champions; NCAA Play-in
1999	Jim Launder	9–7–2	5–5–1	6th	
2000	Dave Schureck	14–4–2	8–1–1	T–1st	A-10 Runners-up
2001	Dave Schureck	11–7–2	8–2–1	2nd	A-10 Semifinal
2002	Dave Schureck	9–10–1	4–7–0	8th	
2003	Dave Schureck	12–5–2	7–3–1	T–3rd	A-10 First Round
2004	Dave Schureck	11–7–1	8–3–0	2nd	A-10 Semifinal
2005	Dennis Currier	11–5–4	5–2–2	4th	A-10 Semifinal
2006	Dennis Currier	6–9–2	2–5–2	10th	
2007	Dennis Currier	10–4–5	4–3–2	6th	A-10 First Round
2008	Dennis Currier	15–4–3	6–2–1	3rd	A-10 Champions; NCAA First Round
2009	Dennis Currier	14–5–1	8–1–0	1st	A-10 Runners-up
2010	Dennis Currier	7–8–3	3–4–2	11th	
2011	Dennis Currier	5–13–1	4–4–1	T–7th	
2012	Dennis Currier	11–5–2	5–3–1	6th	A-10 Quarterfinal
2013	Dennis Currier	14–2–3	4–2–2	5th	A-10 Quarterfinal
2014	Dennis Currier	7–7–5	3–3–2	6th	A-10 Quarterfinal
2015	Dennis Currier	13–5–5	5–1–2	2nd	A-10 Champions; NCAA Second Round
2016	Dennis Currier	7–9–3	3–3–2	8th	A-10 Semifinal
2017	Dennis Currier	9–8–2	6–2–0	4th	A-10 Quarterfinal
2018	Dennis Currier	9–6–4	4–3–1	7th	A-10 Semifinal
2019	Dennis Currier	13–8–0	6–2–0	3rd	A-10 Final
2020	Dennis Currier	4–4–1	4–1–1	1st	A-10 Semifinal
2021	Dennis Currier	6–9–3	3–4–1	8th	A-10 Quarterfinal
2022	Dennis Currier	10–2–5	3–2–3	6th	A-10 Semifinal
2023	Dennis Currier	8–7–6	3–1–4	6th	A-10 Champions; NCAA First Round
2024	Dennis Currier	14–3–3	5–1–2	2nd	A-10 Champions; NCAA Third Round
Total:		534-444-97			
National champion Postseason invitational champion Conference regular season champion Conference regular season and conference tournament champion Division regular season champion Division regular season and conference tournament champion Conference tournament champion

=== NCAA tournament results ===
Dayton has appeared in six NCAA tournaments.

Year	Record	Seed	Region	Round	Opponent	Results
1997	12–8–1	N/A	N/A	Play-in round	Rider	L 1–3
1998	13–8–0	N/A	N/A	Play-in round	Lafayette	L 0–1
2008	15–4–2	N/A	2	First round	UIC	T 0–0 (L 2–3 pen.)
2015	13–5–5	N/A	1	First round Second round	Oakland #9 Ohio State	T 2–2 (W 4–3 pen.); T 1–1 (L 3–4 pen.)
2023	8–7–6	N/A	2	First round	Louisville	L 3–4
2024	14–3–3	5	2	Second round Third round	Michigan #12 SMU	W 2–0; L 3–1
