= Davidson Wildcats men's soccer =

American college soccer team

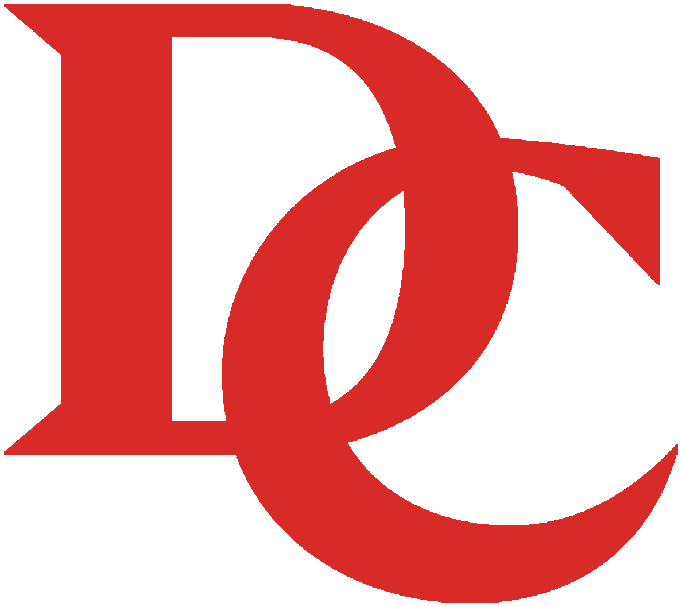
- Founded: 1956; 70 years ago
- University: Davidson College
- Head coach: Mike Babst (5th season)
- Conference: A-10
- Location: Davidson, North Carolina, US
- Stadium: Alumni Soccer Stadium (capacity: 2,000)
- Nickname: Wildcats
- Colors: Red and black
Home	Away

NCAA tournament College Cup
- 1992

NCAA tournament Quarterfinals
- 1992

NCAA tournament Round of 16
- 1992

NCAA tournament appearances
- 1992, 1995, 2003

Conference tournament championships
- 1970, 1971, 1992, 1995, 2003

Conference regular season championships
- 1970, 1971, 1992, 1994, 1995, 2003, 2005

For information on all Davidson College sports, see Davidson Wildcats

The Davidson Wildcats men's soccer team is a varsity intercollegiate athletic team of Davidson College in Davidson, North Carolina, United States. The team is a member of the Atlantic 10 Conference, which is part of the National Collegiate Athletic Association's Division I. Davidson's first men's soccer team was fielded in 1956. The team plays its home games at Alumni Soccer Stadium in Davidson, North Carolina. The Wildcats are coached by Mike Babst.

== Current squad ==
As of 16 May 2020

Note: Flags indicate national team as defined under FIFA eligibility rules; some limited exceptions apply. Players may hold more than one non-FIFA nationality.

No.	Pos.	Nation	Player
0	GK	USA	Zach Schewe
1	GK	USA	Sawyer Gaffney
2	DF	USA	Stefane Zemmali
3	DF	ISL	Finnur Vidarsson
4	FW	USA	Benjamin Gilligan
5	FW	USA	Quinn Dudek
7	MF	USA	Hugh Chatham
8	DF	USA	Tavis Braithwaite
9	MF	USA	Jamie DiLuzio
10	FW	USA	Charlie Caswell
11	MF	USA	Mateo Alzate
12	DF	USA	Tariq Mohammed
13	DF	USA	Jack Wilson
14	DF	USA	Henry Howell

No.	Pos.	Nation	Player
15	MF	USA	Jacob Myers
16	MF	USA	Olivier Merlin-Zhang
17	DF	NZL	Louis Evans
18	FW	USA	Justin Stone
19	MF	USA	Cam Abernathy
20	FW	USA	Ned Morrissett
21	FW	USA	Jackson Bracy
22	MF	USA	Jaylen Thompson
23	DF	USA	Malcolm McCabe
24	DF	USA	Hans Meyer
25	GK	USA	Alan Morales
26	MF	USA	John Dale
30	FW	USA	Lucas Hauth
34	GK	USA	Michael Zemanek

== Seasons ==
National champions †	Conference champions *	Division champions ‡	NCAA Tournament berth ^

Season	Head coach	Conference	Season results							Tournament results	
Season	Head coach	Conference	Overall			Conference				Conference	NCAA (Note: The NCAA Division I Men's Soccer Championship began in 1959.)
Season	Head coach	Conference	W	L	T	W	L	T	Finish	Conference	NCAA
1956	Paul Morrotte	Independent	1	4	1	—	—	—	—	—	—
1957	Paul Morrotte	Independent	4	5	1	—	—	—	—	—	—
1958	Paul Morrotte	Independent	6	5	0	—	—	—	—	—	—
1959	Paul Morrotte	Independent	7	3	0	—	—	—	—	—	—
1960	Paul Morrotte	Independent	8	3	0	—	—	—	—	—	—
1961	Harry Fogleman	Independent	5	4	1	—	—	—	—	—	—
1962	Harry Fogleman	Independent	6	2	0	—	—	—	—	—	—
1963	Harry Fogleman	Independent	9	1	0	—	—	—	—	—	—
1964	Harry Fogleman	Independent	7	4	0	—	—	—	—	—	—
1965	Harry Fogleman	Independent	8	5	0	—	—	—	—	—	—
1966	Harry Fogleman	Independent	5	10	0	—	—	—	—	—	—
1967‡	Harry Fogleman	SoCon	7	5	3	0	0	1	1st, South‡	Final	—
1968	Harry Fogleman	SoCon	4	6	2	2	1	0	2nd	Semifinal	—
1969	Harry Fogleman	SoCon	4	7	1	2	1	1	2nd	Final	—
1970*	Harry Fogleman	SoCon	10	3	1	3	1	0	1st*	Champion*	—
1971*	Harry Fogleman	SoCon	11	2	0	4	0	0	1st*	Champion*	—
1972	Harry Fogleman	SoCon	7	5	0	2	1	0	3rd	—	—
1973	Chip Stone	SoCon	5	7	2	2	1	2	3rd	—	—
1974	Chip Stone	SoCon	8	5	3	1	1	1	3rd	—	—
1975	Chip Stone	SoCon	1	10	1	1	2	0	T-5th	—	—
1976	Chip Stone	SoCon	3	11	1	4	1	0	6th	—	—
1977	Karl Kremser	SoCon	0	16	0	0	5	0	6th	—	—
1978	Karl Kremser	SoCon	5	10	1	1	4	0	5th	—	—
1979	Karl Kremser	SoCon	8	13	0	3	4	0	5th	—	—
1980	Charlie Slagle	SoCon	9	8	0	5	3	0	4th	Semifinal	—
1981	Charlie Slagle	SoCon	13	9	0	6	2	0	2nd	Final	—
1982	Charlie Slagle	SoCon	11	4	4	5	2	0	3rd	Semifinal	—
1983‡	Charlie Slagle	SoCon	13	9	0	6	2	0	1st, North‡	Final	—
1984	Charlie Slagle	SoCon	9	9	1	4	2	0	2nd, North	—	—
1985	Charlie Slagle	SoCon	8	9	2	4	2	0	2nd, North	—	—
1986	Charlie Slagle	SoCon	5	14	1	3	2	0	3rd	—	—
1987	Charlie Slagle	SoCon	11	7	3	4	1	0	2nd	—	—
1988	Charlie Slagle	Independent	8	12	2	—	—	—	—	—	—
1989	Charlie Slagle	Independent	8	11	1	—	—	—	—	—	—
1990	Charlie Slagle	Big South	15	7	2	4	2	0	—	—	—
1991	Charlie Slagle	Big South	8	10	2	4	1	1	2nd	—	—
1992^	Charlie Slagle	SoCon	17	5	5	5	1	0	1st*	Champion*	Semifinal^
1993	Charlie Slagle	SoCon	7	12	2	2	3	1	T-4th	First round	—
1994*	Charlie Slagle	SoCon	12	9	1	5	1	0	T-1st*	Semifinal	—
1995^	Charlie Slagle	SoCon	12	11	1	5	1	0	T-1st*	Champion*	Play-In Round^
1996	Charlie Slagle	SoCon	8	14	0	3	3	0	T-4th	Semifinal	—
1997	Charlie Slagle	SoCon	10	11	0	5	3	0	T-2nd	Semifinal	—
1998	Charlie Slagle	SoCon	5	16	0	4	4	0	T-5th	Quarterfinal	—
1999	Charlie Slagle	SoCon	10	11	0	5	3	0	T-3rd	Semifinal	—
2000	Charlie Slagle	SoCon	11	8	1	6	2	0	T-2nd	Semifinal	—
2001	Matt Spear	SoCon	11	8	0	6	2	0	T-2nd	First round	—
2002	Matt Spear	SoCon	10	6	4	5	2	1	3rd	Semifinal	—
2003^	Matt Spear	SoCon	15	6	2	6	1	0	1st*	Champion*	First round^
2004	Matt Spear	SoCon	11	10	1	4	3	0	4th	Final	—
2005*	Matt Spear	SoCon	14	6	1	5	1	0	1st*	Final	—
2006	Matt Spear	SoCon	5	13	1	1	5	1	7th	First round	—
2007	Matt Spear	SoCon	4	14	1	2	4	1	7th	First round	—
2008	Matt Spear	SoCon	4	14	1	2	5	0	T-6th	First round	—
2009	Matt Spear	SoCon	11	7	0	3	4	0	T-5th	—	—
2010	Matt Spear	SoCon	7	7	6	1	3	3	6th	Semifinal	—
2011	Matt Spear	SoCon	8	3	3	3	2	2	T-4th	First round	—
2012	Matt Spear	SoCon	6	11	1	2	5	0	8th	First round	—
2013	Matt Spear	SoCon	8	10	0	2	4	0	T-5th	First round	—
2014	Matt Spear	A-10	10	2	6	4	2	2	T-4th	Quarterfinal	—
2015	Matt Spear	A-10	5	10	3	2	6	0	12th	—	—
2016	Matt Spear	A-10	4	12	1	2	5	1	12th	—	—
2017	Matt Spear	A-10	8	7	2	3	4	1	9th	—	—
2018	Matt Spear	A-10	9	7	2	5	2	1	2nd	Quarterfinal	—
2019	Mike Babst	A-10	4	11	2	3	5	0	11th	—	—
2020	Mike Babst	A-10	3	4	2	2	2	2	3rd, Central	—	—
2021	Mike Babst	A-10	9	7	2	3	3	2	T-6th	Quarterfinal	—
2022	Mike Babst	A-10	6	8	3	3	4	1	11th	—	—
2023	Mike Babst	A-10	10	5	1	5	4	0	4th	Semifinal	—
2024	Mike Babst	A-10	6	7	5	4	4	0	7th	Quarterfinal	—

=== NCAA tournament results ===
Davidson has appeared in two NCAA tournaments.

Year	Record	Seed	Region	Round	Opponent	Results
1992	16–4–3	N/A	Raleigh	First round Second round Quarterfinals; College Cup	Charlotte; Coastal Carolina; NC State; San Diego	T 2–2 PK; T 0–0 PK; W 1–0^{OT} L 2–3^{OT}
1995	12–11–1	N/A	Dallas	Play-in	Bowling Green	L 1–3
2003	15–5–2	N/A	Chapel Hill	First round	Coastal Carolina	L 0–3

== Achievements ==
- Southern Conference Men's Soccer Tournament: 5
  - Champion : 1970, 1971, 1992, 1995, 2003
  - Runner-Up: 1967, 1969, 1981, 1983, 2004, 2005
- Southern Conference Regular Season: 7
  - Champion : 1970, 1971, 1992, 1994, 1995, 2003, 2005
  - Runner-Up: 1968, 1969, 1981, 1987, 1997, 2000, 2001

== Notable players ==
- Matt Pacifici (born 1993)
- Charlie Reiter (born 1988)
