= 2016 Metro Atlantic Athletic Conference men's soccer season =

- League: NCAA Division I
- Sport: Soccer
- Duration: August, 2016 – November, 2016
- Teams: 10

2017 MLS SuperDraft
- Top draft pick: Eric Klenofsky, Monmouth
- Picked by: D.C. United, 34th overall

Regular season
- Season champions: Quinnipiac
- Runners-up: Rider
- Season MVP: Offensive: Arthur Bosua; Defensive: Wyatt Omsberg

Tournament
- Champions: Rider
- Runners-up: Quinnipiac
- Finals MVP: Elliott Otmani

MAAC men's soccer seasons
- ← 2015 2017 →

2016 Metro Atlantic Athletic Conference men's soccer standings
| | Conf. | | | | | Overall |
| Team | W | | L | | T | W | | L | | T |
|---|---|---|---|---|---|---|---|---|---|---|
| Quinnipiac | 8 | – | 2 | – | 0 | 13 | – | 7 | – | 0 |
| Rider ‡ | 7 | – | 1 | – | 2 | 13 | – | 4 | – | 3 |
| Siena | 6 | – | 3 | – | 1 | 8 | – | 8 | – | 5 |
| Marist | 6 | – | 4 | – | 0 | 11 | – | 7 | – | 1 |
| Canisius | 4 | – | 3 | – | 3 | 9 | – | 8 | – | 3 |
| Monmouth | 5 | – | 5 | – | 0 | 6 | – | 9 | – | 2 |
| Iona | 4 | – | 6 | – | 0 | 5 | – | 13 | – | 0 |
| Fairfield | 3 | – | 6 | – | 1 | 5 | – | 9 | – | 3 |
| Niagara | 3 | – | 6 | – | 1 | 4 | – | 11 | – | 2 |
| Manhattan | 2 | – | 6 | – | 2 | 2 | – | 12 | – | 3 |
| Saint Peter's | 2 | – | 8 | – | 0 | 3 | – | 13 | – | 2 |
‡-Tournament Champion +- Invited to the NCAA Division I Men's Soccer Championship; As of 18 November 2016; Rankings from NSCAA

The 2016 Metro Atlantic Athletic Conference men's soccer season was the 24th season of men's varsity soccer in the conference.

The Colgate Raiders and Lehigh Mountain Hawks are the defending regular season and tournament champions, respectively.

== Changes from 2015 ==
- None

== Teams ==
=== Stadia and locations ===
| Team | Location | Stadium | Capacity |
|---|---|---|---|
| Canisius Golden Griffins | Buffalo, New York | Demske Sports Complex | 1,200 |
| Fairfield Stags | Fairfield, Connecticut | Lessing Field | 600 |
| Iona Gaels | New Rochelle, New York | Mazzella Field | 2,440 |
| Manhattan Jaspers | Riverdale, New York | Gaelic Park | 2,000 |
| Marist Red Foxes | Poughkeepsie, New York | Tenney Stadium | 5,000 |
| Monmouth Hawks | West Long Branch, New Jersey | The Great Lawn | — |
| Niagara Purple Eagles | Lewiston, New York | Niagara Field | 1,200 |
| Quinnipiac Bobcats | Hamden, Connecticut | Quinnipiac Soccer Field | — |
| Rider Broncs | Lawrenceville, New Jersey | Rider Campus Soccer Field | 1,000 |
| Saint Peter's Peacocks | Jersey City, New Jersey | Joseph J. Jaroschak Field | — |
| Siena Saints | Loudonville, New York | Siena Turf Field | 1,000 |

== Regular season ==
=== Rankings ===
Legend
| Increase in ranking |
| Decrease in ranking |
| Not ranked previous week |

| | | Pre | Wk 1 | Wk 2 | Wk 3 | Wk 4 | Wk 5 | Wk 6 | Wk 7 | Wk 8 | Wk 9 | Wk 10 | Wk 11 | Wk 12 | Final |
|---|---|---|---|---|---|---|---|---|---|---|---|---|---|---|---|
| Canisius | C | | | | | | | | | | | | | | |
| Fairfield | C | | | | | | | | | | | | | | |
| Iona | C | | | | | | | | | | | | | | |
| Manhattan | C | | | | | | | | | | | | | | |
| Marist | C | | | | RV | NR | | | | | | | | | |
| Monmouth | C | | | | | | | | | | | | | | |
| Niagara | C | | | | | | | | | | | | | | |
| Quinnipiac | C | | | | | | | | | | | | | | |
| Rider | C | | RV | RV | 22 | RV | NR | RV | RV | NR | RV | RV | RV | NR | RV |
| Saint Peter's | C | | | | | | | | | | | | | | |
| Siena | C | | | | | | | | | | | | | | |

=== Results ===
| Home/Away | CAN | FFD | INA | MAN | MAR | MON | NIA | QUI | RID | STP | SIE |
|---|---|---|---|---|---|---|---|---|---|---|---|
| Canisius Golden Griffins | | | | | | | | | | | |
| Fairfield Stags | | | | | | | | | | | |
| Iona Gaels | | | | | | | | | | | |
| Manhattan Jaspers | | | | | | | | | | | |
| Marist Red Foxes | | | | | | | | | | | |
| Monmouth Hawks | | | | | | | | | | | |
| Niagara Purple Eagles | | | | | | | | | | | |
| Quinnipiac Bobcats | | | | | | | | | | | |
| Rider Broncs | | | | | | | | | | | |
| Saint Peter's Peacocks | | | | | | | | | | | |
| Siena Saints | | | | | | | | | | | |

== Postseason ==
=== MAAC tournament ===
Tournament details to be announced.

=== NCAA tournament ===
| Seed | Region | School | 1st round | 2nd round | 3rd round | Quarterfinals | Semifinals | Championship |
|---|---|---|---|---|---|---|---|---|
| — | Louisville | Rider | L, 1–4 vs. Vermont – (Burlington) | | | | | |

== All-MAAC League awards and teams ==
2016 MAAC Men's Soccer Individual Awards
| Award | Recipient(s) |
| Player of the Year | |
| Coach of the Year | |
| Defensive Player of the Year | |
| Freshman of the Year | |

2016 MAAC Men's Soccer All-Conference Teams
| First Team | Second Team | Rookie Team |

== See also ==
- 2016 NCAA Division I men's soccer season
- 2016 MAAC Men's Soccer Tournament
- 2016 Metro Atlantic Athletic Conference women's soccer season
