= Metro Conference men's soccer tournament =

MAAC men's soccer tournament
- Metro Atlantic Athletic Conference men's soccer championship
- Sport: College soccer
- Conference: Metro Conference (formerly MAAC)
- Number of teams: 6
- Format: Single-elimination
- Played: 1988–present
- Last contest: 2026
- Current champion: Sacred Heart (1st title)
- Most championships: Loyola Maryland (12 titles)
- Official website: maacsports.com/msoc

The Metro Conference men's soccer tournament (formerly the MAAC men's soccer tournament) is the conference championship tournament in soccer for the Metro Conference. The tournament has been held every year since 1988. It is played on a single-elimination format and seeding is based on regular season records. The winner, declared conference champion, receives the conference's automatic bid to the NCAA Division I men's soccer championship.

In 2012, the tournament changed from a ten-team to a four-team tournament. In 2016, the tournament moved to a six-team, three-round tournament with the top two seeds receiving first round byes.

Loyola Maryland is the most winning team of the competition with 12 titles.

== Winners ==
The following is a list of Metro tournament winners:

=== Finals ===
Key

- (1) – Title number
- a.e.t. – Match went to extra time
- p – Match decided by a penalty shootout after extra time
- – Winning team won regular season

Ed.	Year	Champion	Score	Runner-up	Venue	City	Tournament MVP
1	1988	Army (1)		La Salle			John Brence, Army
2	1989	Loyola Maryland (1)	3–0	La Salle			Vince Moskunas, Loyola
3	1990	Loyola Maryland (2)	3–0	La Salle			Doug Miller, Loyola
4	1991	Loyola Maryland (3)	2–0	Fairfield			Tom Donahue, Loyola
5	1992	Loyola Maryland (4)	3–0	Fairfield			Jim Garvey, Loyola
6	1993	Loyola Maryland (5)	1–0 (a.e.t.)	Fairfield			Anthony Novello, Fairfield
7	1994	Loyola Maryland (6)	4–0	Manhattan			Doug Willey, Loyola
8	1995	Loyola Maryland (7)	6–1	Iona			Mike Barger, Loyola
9	1996	Loyola Maryland (8)	2–0	Fairfield			J. T. Dorsey, Loyola
10	1997	Rider (1)	2–0 (a.e.t.)	Loyola Maryland			Mark Bennett, Rider
11	1998	Rider (2)	1–0 (a.e.t.)	Fairfield			Craig Wicken, Rider
12	1999	Fairfield (1)	2–1	Loyola Maryland			David Mancini, Fairfield
13	2000	Marist (1)	3–2 (a.e.t.)	Fairfield			Sean Murphy, Marist
14	2001	Loyola Maryland (9)	1–0 (a.e.t.)	Fairfield			Graham Marchant, Loyola
15	2002	Loyola Maryland (10)	2–1	Marist			Steven Coleman, Loyola
16	2003	Saint Peter's (1)	2–1	Loyola Maryland			Rinaldo Chambers, St. Peter's
17	2004	Marist (2)	2–0	Rider			Keith Detelj, Marist
18	2005	Marist (3)	2–1	Fairfield			Keith Detelj, Marist
19	2006	Fairfield (2)	1–0	Saint Peter's	Lessing Field	Fairfield, CT	Alex Cunliffe, Fairfield
20	2007	Loyola Maryland (11)	1–0	Saint Peter's	Wide World of Sports	Lake B. Vista, FL	Miloš Kočić, Loyola
21	2008	Fairfield (3)	1–0	Loyola Maryland	Tenney Stadium	Poughkeepsie, NY	Christian Uy, Fairfield
22	2009	Loyola Maryland (12)	1–0 (a.e.t.)	Niagara	Lessing Field	Fairfield, CT	Tennant McVea, Loyola
23	2010	Saint Peter's (2)	2–1	Iona	Geppi-Aikens Field	Baltimore, MD	Lebogang Pila, St. Peter's
24	2011	Fairfield (4)	3–1	Manhattan	Sports Complex	Lake B. Vista, FL	Jack Burridge, Fairfield
25	2012	Niagara (1)	1–0 (a.e.t.)	Loyola Maryland	Leonidoff Field	Poughkeepsie, NY	Rene De Zorzi, Niagara
26	2013	Quinnipiac (1)	0–0 (4–3 p)	Monmouth	Lessing Field	Fairfield, CT	Borja Angoitia, Quinnipiac
27	2014	Monmouth (1)	2–1 (a.e.t.)	Fairfield	Quinnipiac Field	Hamden, CT	Emmanuel Senyah, Monmouth
28	2015	Rider (3)	3–2	Monmouth	Sports Complex	Lake B. Vista, FL	Elliot Otmani, Rider
29	2016	Rider (4)	3–1	Quinnipiac	Quinnipiac Field	Hamden, CT	Ryan Baird, Rider
30	2017	Fairfield (5)	1–0	Rider	Lessing Field	Fairfield, CT	Angus Hastings, Fairfield
31	2018	Rider (5)	1–0	Quinnipiac	Quinnipiac Stadium	Hamden, CT	Elliott Otmani, Rider
32	2019	Iona (1)	3–2 (a.e.t.)	Saint Peter's	Jaroschak Field	Jersey City, NJ	Josh Plimpton, Iona
33	2020	Monmouth (2)	1–0	Quinnipiac	Quinnipiac Stadium	Hamden, CT	Julian Gomez, Monmouth
34	2021	Marist (4)	2–2 (5–3 p)	Rider	Tenney Stadium	Poughkeepsie, NY	Kyle Galloway, Marist
35	2022	Quinnipiac (2)	3–2	Iona	Quinnipiac Stadium	Hamden, CT	Karl Netzell, Quinnipiac
36	2023	Rider (6)	2–1	Iona	Mazzella Field	New Rochelle, NY	Momo Diop, Rider
37	2024	Iona (2)	1–0 (a.e.t.)	Rider	Mazzella Field	New Rochelle, NY	Sergio Gonzalez Fernandez, Iona
38	2025	Siena (1)	2–1	Sacred Heart	Lessing Field	Fairfield, CT	Andrew Samuels, Siena
39	2026	Sacred Heart (1)	2–1 (a.e.t.)	Merrimack	Campus Field	Fairfield, CT	Ivan Morcillo, Sacred Heart

== Championships by school ==
Team	Titles	Winning years
Loyola Maryland	12	1989, 1990, 1991, 1992, 1993, 1994, 1995, 1996, 2001, 2002, 2007, 2009
Rider	6	1997, 1998, 2015, 2016, 2018, 2023
Fairfield	5	1999, 2006, 2008, 2011, 2017
Marist	3	2000, 2004, 2005
Monmouth	2	2014, 2020
Saint Peter's	2	2003, 2010
Quinnipiac	2	2013, 2022
Iona	2	2019, 2024
Army	1	1988
Niagara	1	2012
Siena	1	2025
Sacred Heart	1	2026
