= 2013 Metro Atlantic Athletic Conference men's soccer season =

MAAC
- Season: 2013
- Champions: TBD
- Premiers: TBD
- NCAA Tournament: TBD

The 2013 Metro Atlantic Athletic Conference men's soccer season will be the 21st season of men's varsity soccer in the conference.

The defending regular season champions, the Loyola Greyhounds, left the MAAC for the Patriot League. The defending tournament champions are the Niagara Purple Eagles.

== Changes from 2012 ==
- Quinnipiac and Monmouth are joining the MAAC from the Northeast Conference.
- Loyola is leaving the conference to join the Patriot League.

== Teams ==
=== Stadia and locations ===
| Team | Location | Stadium | Capacity |
|---|---|---|---|
| Canisius Golden Griffins | Buffalo, New York | Demske Sports Complex | 1,200 |
| Fairfield Stags | Fairfield, Connecticut | Lessing Field | 600 |
| Iona Gaels | New Rochelle, New York | Mazzella Field | 2,440 |
| Manhattan Jaspers | Riverdale, New York | Gaelic Park | 2,000 |
| Marist Red Foxes | Poughkeepsie, New York | Tenney Stadium | 5,000 |
| Monmouth Hawks | West Long Branch, New Jersey | The Great Lawn | —N/a |
| Niagara Purple Eagles | Lewiston, New York | Niagara Field | 1,200 |
| Quinnipiac Bobcats | Hamden, Connecticut | Quinnipiac Soccer Field | —N/a |
| Rider Broncs | Lawrenceville, New Jersey | Rider Campus Soccer Field | 1,000 |
| Saint Peter's Peacocks | Jersey City, New Jersey | Joseph J. Jaroschak Field | —N/a |
| Siena Saints | Loudonville, New York | Siena Turf Field | 1,000 |

== Results ==
| Home/Away | CAN | FAIR | IONA | MAN | MAR | MON | NIA | QUI | RID | STP | SIE |
|---|---|---|---|---|---|---|---|---|---|---|---|
| Canisius Golden Griffins | | | | | | | | | | | |
| Fairfield Stags | | | | | | | | | | | |
| Iona Gaels | | | | | | | | | | | |
| Manhattan Jaspers | | | | | | | | | | | |
| Marist Red Foxes | | | | | | | | | | | |
| Monmouth Hawks | | | | | | | | | | | |
| Niagara Purple Eagles | | | | | | | | | | | |
| Quinnipiac Bobcats | | | | | | | | | | | |
| Rider Broncs | | | | | | | | | | | |
| Saint Peter's Peacocks | | | | | | | | | | | |
| Siena Saints | | | | | | | | | | | |
