= 2019 MAAC men's soccer tournament =

- Classification: Division I
- Teams: 6
- Quarterfinals site: Higher seeds
- Semifinals site: Higher seeds
- Finals site: Jaroschak Field; Jersey City, NJ
- Champions: Iona (1st title)
- Winning coach: James Hamilton (1st title)
- MVP: Josh Plimpton (Iona)
- Broadcast: ESPN+

2019 Metro Atlantic Athletic Conference men's soccer standings
	Conf.					Overall
Team	W		L		T	W		L		T
Saint Peter's	9	–	1	–	0	13	–	6	–	0
Quinnipiac	7	–	2	–	1	9	–	6	–	3
Iona ‡	6	–	3	–	1	14	–	6	–	1
Marist	6	–	4	–	0	10	–	9	–	0
Manhattan	5	–	4	–	1	6	–	10	–	1
Rider	4	–	4	–	2	7	–	8	–	2
Niagara	4	–	5	–	1	6	–	11	–	1
Fairfield	3	–	4	–	2	5	–	7	–	4
Monmouth	3	–	7	–	1	3	–	13	–	2
Siena	2	–	7	–	1	5	–	12	–	1
Canisius	1	–	9	–	0	3	–	15	–	0
‡ – 2019 MAAC Tournament champion + – Invited to the 2019 NCAA tournament; As of 22 November 2019; Rankings from United Soccer Coaches

The 2019 MAAC men's soccer tournament, was the 27th edition of the MAAC Men's Soccer Tournament, a post-season college soccer conference tournament to determine the MAAC champion, and the conference's automatic berth into the NCAA Division I men's soccer tournament. The 2019 edition of the tournament began on November 10 and concluded on November 17, 2019.

Iona won the 2019 MAAC title, which was the program's first ever MAAC championship, allowing them to earn their first ever berth into the NCAA Tournament. There, they lost in the opening round to defending national champions, Maryland.

== Seeds ==
Seed	School	Conference	Tiebreaker
1	Saint Peter's	9–1–0	
2	Quinnipiac	7–2–1	
3	Iona	6–3–1	
4	Marist	6–4–0	
5	Manhattan	5–4–1	
6	Rider	4–4–2	

== Bracket ==
First Round
4	Marist	2
5	Manhattan	1
3	Iona	2
6	Rider	1

Semifinals
1	Saint Peter's	3
4	Marist	2
2	Quinnipiac	1
3	Iona	2

Championship
1	Saint Peter's	2
3	Iona (a.e.t.)	3

== Schedule ==
=== First round ===
November 10, 2019
1:00 PM EST

No. 3 Iona	2–1	No. 6 Rider
Mackic 30'; Plimpton 40'	Report	Gomez Olano 41'

Mazzella Field, New Rochelle, New York
Attendance: 314
Referee: Jason Silver

November 10, 2019
6:00 PM EST

No. 4 Marist	2–1	No. 5 Manhattan
Gavilanes 57'; Jaime 60'	Report	Joseph-Buadi 71'

Leonidoff Field, Poughkeepsie, New York
Attendance: 508
Referee: Mike De Felice

=== Semifinals ===
November 14, 2019
1:00 PM EST

No. 2 Quinnipiac	1–2	No. 3 Iona
Aasen 89'	Report	Plimpton 22'; Najim 34'

QU Soccer Stadium, Hamden, Connecticut
Attendance: 321
Referee: David Belmnahia

November 14, 2019
1:00 PM EST

No. 1 Saint Peter's	3–2	No. 4 Marist
Davis 10'; Climpson 81'; Jowers 87'	Report	Sienkiel 18'; Copetti 52'

Jaroschak Field, Jersey City, New Jersey
Attendance: 147
Referee: John Barr

=== Championship ===
November 17, 2019
1:00 PM EST

No. 1 Saint Peter's	2–3 (a.e.t.)	No. 3 Iona
Jowers 50'; Laws 58'	Report	Bravo 74' (pen.) 100'; Plimpton 76'

Jaroschak Field, Jersey City, New Jersey
Attendance: 493
Referee: Michael McBride

== Statistics ==
=== Goalscorers ===
3 Goals

- (United States) Josh Plimpton – Iona

2 Goals

- (Spain) Mauro Bravo – Iona
- (England) Jordan Jowers – Saint Peter's

1 Goal

- (Norway) Brage Aasen – Quinnipiac
- (England) Tom Climpson – Saint Peter's
- (Canada) Stefan Copetti – Marist
- (England) Jamie Davis – Saint Peter's
- (United States) Allen Gavilanes – Marist
- (Spain) Francisco Gomez Olano – Rider
- (United States) Justin Jaime – Marist
- (England) Brandon Joseph-Buadi – Manhattan
- (England) Dominic Laws – Saint Peter's
- (United States) Esad Mackic – Iona
- (Spain) Najim Romero – Iona
- (United States) Antek Sinkel – Marist

== All-Tournament team ==
Player	Team
**MAAC Men's Soccer All-Tournament team**
Allen Gavilanes	Marist
Samad Bounthong	Marist
Domen Bozic	Quinnipiac
Henry Weigand	Quinnipiac
Jordan Jowers	Saint Peter's
Tom Coulson	Saint Peter's
Dominic Laws	Saint Peter's
Mauro Bravo	Iona
Malcolm Moreno	Iona
**Josh Plimpton**	Iona
Najim Romero	Iona

MVP in bold.
