= List of NCAA Division I men's soccer programs =

This is a list of men's college soccer programs in the United States, that play in NCAA Division I. As of the recent 2025 NCAA Division I men's soccer season, 215 schools in the United States sponsored Division I varsity men's soccer; 211 of these schools are full Division I members, three (Le Moyne, Mercyhurst, and New Haven) are in transition from Division II to Division I, and one [Saint Francis (PA)] transitioned to Division III.

This list reflects each team's conference affiliation as of the 2026 season. Affiliations are those for men's soccer, and do not necessarily match the schools' main affiliations.

== Current Division I schools ==
Institution	Nickname	Location	State	Type	Conference
University at Albany (Albany)	Great Danes	Albany	New York	State	America East Conference
Binghamton University	Bearcats	Binghamton (Note: While the entire campus has a Binghamton mailing address, the core of the campus, including its athletic facilities, is in the adjacent town of Vestal.)	New York	State	America East Conference
Bryant University	Bulldogs	Smithfield	Rhode Island	Private/Nonsectarian	America East Conference
University of New Hampshire	Wildcats	Durham	New Hampshire	State	America East Conference
New Jersey Institute of Technology (NJIT)	Highlanders	Newark	New Jersey	State	America East Conference
University of Massachusetts Lowell (UMass Lowell)	River Hawks	Lowell	Massachusetts	State	America East Conference
University of Maryland, Baltimore County (UMBC)	Retrievers	Catonsville (Note: The campus has a Baltimore mailing address.)	Maryland	State	America East Conference
University of Vermont	Catamounts	Burlington	Vermont	State	America East Conference
University of North Carolina at Charlotte (Charlotte)	49ers	Charlotte	North Carolina	State	American Conference
Florida Atlantic University (FAU)	Owls	Boca Raton	Florida	State	American Conference
Florida International University (FIU)	Panthers	Miami (Note: FIU has a Miami mailing address, but the campus lies outside the city limits in the Miami-Dade County community of University Park.)	Florida	State	American Conference
University of Memphis	Tigers	Memphis	Tennessee	State	American Conference
Missouri State University	Bears	Springfield	Missouri	State	American Conference
University of South Florida	Bulls	Tampa	Florida	State	American Conference
Temple University	Owls	Philadelphia	Pennsylvania	State-related	American Conference
University of Tulsa	Golden Hurricane	Tulsa	Oklahoma	Private/Presbyterian	American Conference
University of Alabama at Birmingham (UAB)	Blazers	Birmingham	Alabama	State	American Conference
Davidson College	Wildcats	Davidson	North Carolina	Private/Presbyterian	Atlantic 10 Conference
University of Dayton	Flyers	Dayton	Ohio	Private/Catholic	Atlantic 10 Conference
Duquesne University	Dukes	Pittsburgh	Pennsylvania	Private/Catholic	Atlantic 10 Conference
Fordham University	Rams	The Bronx, New York City	New York	Private/Catholic	Atlantic 10 Conference
George Mason University	Patriots	Fairfax (Note: While the main campus has a Fairfax mailing address, it lies in unincorporated Fairfax County, which encloses but does not include the city of Fairfax. The U.S. Census Bureau designates the main campus as George Mason, Virginia.)	Virginia	State	Atlantic 10 Conference
George Washington University	Revolutionaries	Washington	D.C.	Private/Nonsectarian	Atlantic 10 Conference
La Salle University	Explorers	Philadelphia	Pennsylvania	Private/Catholic	Atlantic 10 Conference
Loyola University Chicago	Ramblers	Chicago	Illinois	Private/Catholic	Atlantic 10 Conference
University of Rhode Island	Rams	Kingston	Rhode Island	State	Atlantic 10 Conference
St. Bonaventure University	Bonnies	St. Bonaventure (Note: The St. Bonaventure campus is its own census-designated place and postal entity within the town of Allegany.)	New York	Private/Catholic	Atlantic 10 Conference
Saint Joseph's University	Hawks	Philadelphia (Note: The campus has a Philadelphia mailing address, but straddles the boundary between Philadelphia and Lower Merion Township. The soccer stadium is in Philadelphia.)	Pennsylvania	Private/Catholic	Atlantic 10 Conference
Saint Louis University	Billikens	St. Louis	Missouri	Private/Catholic	Atlantic 10 Conference
Virginia Commonwealth University (VCU)	Rams	Richmond	Virginia	State	Atlantic 10 Conference
Boston College	Eagles	Newton (Note: The main campus has a Chestnut Hill mailing address. However, Chestnut Hill is not an incorporated entity, and the main campus is split between Boston and Newton. The soccer stadium is on a separate campus that lies within the Newton city limits and has a Newton mailing address.)	Massachusetts	Private/Catholic	Atlantic Coast Conference
University of California, Berkeley (California/Cal)	Golden Bears	Berkeley	California	State	Atlantic Coast Conference
Clemson University	Tigers	Clemson	South Carolina	State	Atlantic Coast Conference
Duke University	Blue Devils	Durham	North Carolina	Private/Nonsectarian	Atlantic Coast Conference
University of Louisville	Cardinals	Louisville	Kentucky	State	Atlantic Coast Conference
North Carolina State University (NC State)	Wolfpack	Raleigh	North Carolina	State	Atlantic Coast Conference
University of North Carolina at Chapel Hill (North Carolina)	Tar Heels	Chapel Hill	North Carolina	State	Atlantic Coast Conference
University of Notre Dame	Fighting Irish	Notre Dame	Indiana	Private/Catholic	Atlantic Coast Conference
University of Pittsburgh (Pitt)	Panthers	Pittsburgh	Pennsylvania	State-related	Atlantic Coast Conference
Southern Methodist University (SMU)	Mustangs	Dallas (Note: Nearly all of the SMU campus, including the soccer stadium, lies within University Park, a separate city contained within the city limits of Dallas. However, all locations within University Park have a Dallas mailing address.)	Texas	Private/Methodist	Atlantic Coast Conference
Stanford University	Cardinal	Stanford	California	Private/Nonsectarian	Atlantic Coast Conference
Syracuse University	Orange	Syracuse	New York	Private/Nonsectarian	Atlantic Coast Conference
University of Virginia	Cavaliers	Charlottesville (Note: UVA has a Charlottesville mailing address, but its soccer stadium is in Albemarle County, which encloses but does not include the city of Charlottesville.)	Virginia	State	Atlantic Coast Conference
Virginia Polytechnic Institute and State University (Virginia Tech)	Hokies	Blacksburg	Virginia	State	Atlantic Coast Conference
Wake Forest University	Demon Deacons	Winston-Salem	North Carolina	Private/Nonsectarian	Atlantic Coast Conference
Bellarmine University	Knights	Louisville	Kentucky	Private/Catholic	Atlantic Sun Conference
University of Central Arkansas	Bears	Conway	Arkansas	State	Atlantic Sun Conference
Florida Gulf Coast University (FGCU)	Eagles	Fort Myers (Note: While the campus has a Fort Myers mailing address, it lies in unincorporated Lee County.)	Florida	State	Atlantic Sun Conference
Jacksonville University	Dolphins	Jacksonville	Florida	Private/Nonsectarian	Atlantic Sun Conference
Lipscomb University	Bisons	Nashville	Tennessee	Private/Churches of Christ	Atlantic Sun Conference
University of North Florida	Ospreys	Jacksonville	Florida	State	Atlantic Sun Conference
Queens University of Charlotte [Queens (NC)]	Royals	Charlotte	North Carolina	Private/Presbyterian	Atlantic Sun Conference
Stetson University	Hatters	DeLand	Florida	Private/Nonsectarian	Atlantic Sun Conference
University of West Florida (Note: West Florida began a transition from Division II to Division I in the 2026–27 school year, and is scheduled to become a full D-I member in the 2029–30 school year.)	Argonauts	Pensacola	Florida	State	Atlantic Sun Conference
University of Akron	Zips	Akron	Ohio	State	Big East Conference
Butler University	Bulldogs	Indianapolis	Indiana	Private/Nonsectarian	Big East Conference
Creighton University	Bluejays	Omaha	Nebraska	Private/Catholic	Big East Conference
DePaul University	Blue Demons	Chicago	Illinois	Private/Catholic	Big East Conference
Georgetown University	Hoyas	Washington	D.C.	Private/Catholic	Big East Conference
Marquette University	Golden Eagles	Milwaukee	Wisconsin	Private/Catholic	Big East Conference
Providence College	Friars	Providence	Rhode Island	Private/Catholic	Big East Conference
St. John's University	Red Storm	Queens, New York City	New York	Private/Catholic	Big East Conference
Seton Hall University	Pirates	South Orange	New Jersey	Private/Catholic	Big East Conference
University of Connecticut (UConn)	Huskies	Storrs	Connecticut	State	Big East Conference
Villanova University	Wildcats	Villanova (Note: The Villanova campus is its own census-designated place and postal entity, straddling the boundary between Lower Merion Township and Radnor Township.)	Pennsylvania	Private/Catholic	Big East Conference
Xavier University	Musketeers	Cincinnati	Ohio	Private/Catholic	Big East Conference
Gardner–Webb University	Runnin' Bulldogs	Boiling Springs	North Carolina	Private/Baptist	Big South Conference
High Point University	Panthers	High Point	North Carolina	Private/Methodist	Big South Conference
Longwood University	Lancers	Farmville	Virginia	State	Big South Conference
Presbyterian College	Blue Hose	Clinton	South Carolina	Private/Presbyterian	Big South Conference
Radford University	Highlanders	Radford	Virginia	State	Big South Conference
University of North Carolina at Asheville (UNC Asheville)	Bulldogs	Asheville	North Carolina	State	Big South Conference
University of South Carolina Upstate (USC Upstate)	Spartans	Spartanburg	South Carolina	State	Big South Conference
Winthrop University	Eagles	Rock Hill	South Carolina	State	Big South Conference
Indiana University Bloomington (Indiana)	Hoosiers	Bloomington	Indiana	State	Big Ten Conference
University of Maryland, College Park (Maryland)	Terrapins	College Park	Maryland	State	Big Ten Conference
University of Michigan	Wolverines	Ann Arbor	Michigan	State	Big Ten Conference
Michigan State University	Spartans	East Lansing	Michigan	State	Big Ten Conference
Northwestern University	Wildcats	Evanston	Illinois	Private/Nonsectarian	Big Ten Conference
Ohio State University	Buckeyes	Columbus	Ohio	State	Big Ten Conference
Pennsylvania State University (Penn State)	Nittany Lions	University Park (Note: The U.S. Postal Service considers the entire Penn State campus to have a University Park mailing address. The campus spreads across three adjoining communities: State College, Ferguson Township, and College Township. The university administration is in State College and the soccer stadium is in College Township.)	Pennsylvania	State-related	Big Ten Conference
Rutgers University–New Brunswick (Rutgers)	Scarlet Knights	Piscataway (Note: The main Rutgers campus is divided between New Brunswick and Piscataway. The university administration is in New Brunswick, but the athletic administration and soccer stadium are in Piscataway.)	New Jersey	State-private hybrid	Big Ten Conference
University of California, Los Angeles (UCLA)	Bruins	Los Angeles	California	State	Big Ten Conference
University of Washington	Huskies	Seattle	Washington	State	Big Ten Conference
University of Wisconsin–Madison (Wisconsin)	Badgers	Madison	Wisconsin	State	Big Ten Conference
California State University, Bakersfield (Bakersfield/Cal State Bakersfield)	Roadrunners	Bakersfield	California	State	Big West Conference
California State University, Fullerton (Cal State Fullerton)	Titans	Fullerton	California	State	Big West Conference
California State University, Northridge (Cal State Northridge/CSUN)	Matadors	Northridge, Los Angeles	California	State	Big West Conference
California State University, Sacramento (Sacramento State)	Hornets	Sacramento	California	State	Big West Conference
University of California, Irvine (UC Irvine)	Anteaters	Irvine	California	State	Big West Conference
University of California, Santa Barbara (UC Santa Barbara)	Gauchos	Santa Barbara (Note: The campus has a Santa Barbara mailing address, but is located in the census-designated place of Isla Vista.)	California	State	Big West Conference (West Coast Conference in 2027)
Utah Valley University	Wolverines	Orem	Utah	State	Big West Conference
Campbell University	Fighting Camels	Buies Creek	North Carolina	Private/Baptist	Coastal Athletic Association
College of Charleston (Charleston)	Cougars	Charleston	South Carolina	State	Coastal Athletic Association
Drexel University	Dragons	Philadelphia	Pennsylvania	Private/Nonsectarian	Coastal Athletic Association
Elon University	Phoenix	Elon	North Carolina	Private/Nonsectarian	Coastal Athletic Association
Hofstra University	Pride	Hempstead	New York	Private/Nonsectarian	Coastal Athletic Association
Monmouth University	Hawks	West Long Branch	New Jersey	Private/Nonsectarian	Coastal Athletic Association
Northeastern University	Huskies	Boston	Massachusetts	Private/Nonsectarian	Coastal Athletic Association
Stony Brook University	Seawolves	Stony Brook	New York	State	Coastal Athletic Association
University of North Carolina Wilmington (UNC Wilmington/UNCW)	Seahawks	Wilmington	North Carolina	State	Coastal Athletic Association
College of William & Mary (William & Mary)	Tribe	Williamsburg	Virginia	State	Coastal Athletic Association
Cleveland State University	Vikings	Cleveland	Ohio	State	Horizon League
University of Detroit Mercy	Titans	Detroit	Michigan	Private/Catholic	Horizon League
University of Wisconsin–Green Bay (Green Bay)	Phoenix	Green Bay	Wisconsin	State	Horizon League
Indiana University Indianapolis (Note: Inherited the athletic program of the former Indiana University–Purdue University Indianapolis (IUPUI), which was dissolved effective on July 1, 2024, and replaced by separate institutions affiliated with the Indiana University and Purdue University systems. The athletic program's official website changed its primary brand to IU Indy shortly before the campus split.) (IU Indy)	Jaguars	Indianapolis	Indiana	State	Horizon League
University of Wisconsin–Milwaukee (Milwaukee)	Panthers	Milwaukee	Wisconsin	State	Horizon League
Northern Illinois University (NIU)	Huskies	DeKalb	Illinois	State	Horizon League
Northern Kentucky University	Norse	Highland Heights	Kentucky	State	Horizon League
Oakland University	Golden Grizzlies	Rochester (Note: The campus has a Rochester mailing address, but is physically split between the communities of Rochester Hills and Auburn Hills.)	Michigan	State	Horizon League
Purdue University Fort Wayne (Purdue Fort Wayne)	Mastodons	Fort Wayne	Indiana	State	Horizon League
Robert Morris University	Colonials	Moon Township	Pennsylvania	Private/Nonsectarian	Horizon League
Wright State University	Raiders	Dayton (Note: The campus has a Dayton mailing address, but lies well to the east of the city limits in Fairborn.)	Ohio	State	Horizon League
Brown University	Bears	Providence	Rhode Island	Private/Nonsectarian	Ivy League
Columbia University	Lions	New York City	New York	Private/Nonsectarian	Ivy League
Cornell University	Big Red	Ithaca	New York	Private/Statutory state	Ivy League
Dartmouth College	Big Green	Hanover	New Hampshire	Private/Nonsectarian	Ivy League
Harvard University	Crimson	Boston (Note: While Harvard's administrative offices and undergraduate campus are in Cambridge, the athletic administration and almost all athletic facilities, including the soccer stadium, are within the Boston city limits and have a Boston mailing address.)	Massachusetts	Private/Nonsectarian	Ivy League
Princeton University	Tigers	Princeton	New Jersey	Private/Nonsectarian	Ivy League
University of Pennsylvania (Penn)	Quakers	Philadelphia	Pennsylvania	Private/Nonsectarian	Ivy League
Yale University	Bulldogs	New Haven	Connecticut	Private/Nonsectarian	Ivy League
Canisius University	Golden Griffins	Buffalo	New York	Private/Catholic	Metro Conference
Fairfield University	Stags	Fairfield	Connecticut	Private/Catholic	Metro Conference (Coastal Athletic Association in 2027)
Iona University	Gaels	New Rochelle	New York	Private/Catholic	Metro Conference
Manhattan University	Jaspers	The Bronx, New York City (Note: The Manhattan campus' mailing address is the Bronx neighborhood of Riverdale.)	New York	Private/Catholic	Metro Conference
Marist University	Red Foxes	Poughkeepsie	New York	Private/Nonsectarian	Metro Conference
Merrimack College	Warriors	North Andover	Massachusetts	Private/Catholic	Metro Conference
Mount St. Mary's University	Mountaineers / The Mount	Emmitsburg (Note: The Mount St. Mary's campus has an Emmitsburg mailing address, but is in unincorporated Frederick County.)	Maryland	Private/Catholic	Metro Conference
Niagara University	Purple Eagles	Niagara University (Note: The Niagara campus is its own census-designated place and postal entity within the town of Lewiston.)	New York	Private/Catholic	Metro Conference
Quinnipiac University	Bobcats	Hamden	Connecticut	Private/Nonsectarian	Metro Conference
Rider University	Broncs	Lawrenceville	New Jersey	Private/Nonsectarian	Metro Conference
Sacred Heart University	Pioneers	Fairfield	Connecticut	Private/Catholic	Metro Conference
Saint Peter's University	Peacocks	Jersey City	New Jersey	Private/Catholic	Metro Conference
Siena University	Saints	Loudonville	New York	Private/Catholic	Metro Conference
Belmont University	Bruins	Nashville	Tennessee	Private/Christian	Missouri Valley Conference
Bowling Green State University	Falcons	Bowling Green	Ohio	State	Missouri Valley Conference
Bradley University	Braves	Peoria	Illinois	Private/Nonsectarian	Missouri Valley Conference
Drake University	Bulldogs	Des Moines	Iowa	Private/Nonsectarian	Missouri Valley Conference
University of Evansville	Purple Aces	Evansville	Indiana	Private/Methodist	Missouri Valley Conference
University of Illinois Chicago (UIC)	Flames	Chicago	Illinois	State	Missouri Valley Conference
Western Michigan University	Broncos	Kalamazoo	Michigan	State	Missouri Valley Conference
United States Air Force Academy (Air Force)	Falcons	USAF Academy (Note: Virtually all of the Academy grounds, including the cadet area and all athletic facilities, is outside the city limits of Colorado Springs. The U.S. Census Bureau and U.S. Postal Service consider the Academy to be its own entity, respectively designating it as "Air Force Academy" and "USAF Academy".)	Colorado	Federal academy	Mountain West Conference
Grand Canyon University	Antelopes	Phoenix	Arizona	Private/Christian	Mountain West Conference
San Jose State University	Spartans	San Jose	California	State	Mountain West Conference
University of California, Davis (UC Davis)	Aggies	Davis	California	State	Mountain West Conference
University of Nevada, Las Vegas (UNLV)	Rebels	Las Vegas (Note: The UNLV campus lies outside the Las Vegas city limits in the unincorporated area of Paradise. The U.S. Postal Service considers all unincorporated areas in the Las Vegas Valley to have a Las Vegas address.)	Nevada	State	Mountain West Conference
Utah Tech University	Trailblazers	St. George	Utah	State	Mountain West Conference
Central Connecticut State University	Blue Devils	New Britain	Connecticut	State	NEC
Chicago State University	Cougars	Chicago	Illinois	State	NEC
Fairleigh Dickinson University	Knights	Madison & Florham Park	New Jersey	Private/Nonsectarian	NEC
Howard University	Bison	Washington	D.C.	Private/Nonsectarian	NEC
Le Moyne College	Dolphins	Syracuse (Note: The Le Moyne campus has a Syracuse mailing address, but physically lies in the adjacent town of DeWitt.)	New York	Private/Catholic	NEC
Long Island University (LIU)	Sharks	Brookville (Note: LIU has primary campuses in both Brooklyn and Brookville, New York; the men's soccer program operates from Brookville.)	New York	Private/Nonsectarian	NEC
Mercyhurst University (Note: Mercyhurst began a transition from Division II to Division I in the 2024–25 school year, and is scheduled to become a full D-I member in the 2027–28 school year.)	Lakers	Erie	Pennsylvania	Private/Catholic	NEC
University of New Haven (Note: New Haven began a transition from Division II to Division I in the 2025–26 school year, and is scheduled to become a full D-I member in the 2028–29 school year.)	Chargers	West Haven	Connecticut	Private/Nonsectarian	NEC
Stonehill College	Skyhawks	Easton	Massachusetts	Private/Catholic	NEC
Eastern Illinois University	Panthers	Charleston	Illinois	State	Ohio Valley Conference
Houston Christian University	Huskies	Houston	Texas	Private/Baptist	Ohio Valley Conference
University of the Incarnate Word (UIW)	Cardinals	San Antonio & Alamo Heights	Texas	Private/Catholic	Ohio Valley Conference
Lindenwood University	Lions	St. Charles	Missouri	Private/Nonsectarian	Ohio Valley Conference
Southern Illinois University Edwardsville (SIU Edwardsville/SIUE)	Cougars	Edwardsville	Illinois	State	Ohio Valley Conference
University of Southern Indiana	Screaming Eagles	Evansville (Note: The USI campus has an Evansville mailing address, but is in unincorporated Vanderburgh County.)	Indiana	State	Ohio Valley Conference
University of Texas Rio Grande Valley (UTRGV)	Vaqueros	Edinburg (Note: While UTRGV has multiple campuses in its service area of the Rio Grande Valley, its athletic department is based at the Edinburg campus, inherited from UTRGV's athletic predecessor of UT Pan American.)	Texas	State	Ohio Valley Conference
Western Illinois University	Leathernecks	Macomb	Illinois	State	Ohio Valley Conference
California Baptist University	Lancers	Riverside	California	Private/Baptist	Pac-12 Conference
California Polytechnic State University, San Luis Obispo (Cal Poly)	Mustangs	San Luis Obispo	California	State	Pac-12 Conference
Gonzaga University	Bulldogs	Spokane	Washington	Private/Catholic	Pac-12 Conference
Oregon State University	Beavers	Corvallis	Oregon	State	Pac-12 Conference
San Diego State University	Aztecs	San Diego	California	State	Pac-12 Conference
University of California, Riverside (UC Riverside)	Highlanders	Riverside	California	State	Pac-12 Conference
University of California, San Diego (UC San Diego/UCSD)	Tritons	La Jolla, San Diego	California	State	Pac-12 Conference (West Coast Conference in 2027)
American University	Eagles	Washington	D.C.	Private/Methodist	Patriot League
United States Military Academy (Army/Army West Point)	Black Knights	West Point	New York	Federal academy	Patriot League
Boston University	Terriers	Boston	Massachusetts	Private/Methodist	Patriot League
Bucknell University	Bison	Lewisburg	Pennsylvania	Private/Nonsectarian	Patriot League
Colgate University	Raiders	Hamilton	New York	Private/Nonsectarian	Patriot League
College of the Holy Cross	Crusaders	Worcester	Massachusetts	Private/Catholic	Patriot League
Lafayette College	Leopards	Easton	Pennsylvania	Private/Presbyterian	Patriot League
Lehigh University	Mountain Hawks	Bethlehem	Pennsylvania	Private/Nonsectarian	Patriot League
Loyola University Maryland	Greyhounds	Baltimore	Maryland	Private/Catholic	Patriot League
United States Naval Academy (Navy/Annapolis)	Midshipmen	Annapolis	Maryland	Federal academy	Patriot League
East Tennessee State University (ETSU)	Buccaneers	Johnson City	Tennessee	State	Southern Conference
Furman University	Paladins	Greenville	South Carolina	Private/Nonsectarian	Southern Conference
Liberty University	Flames	Lynchburg	Virginia	Private/Christian	Southern Conference
Mercer University	Bears	Macon	Georgia	Private/Nonsectarian	Southern Conference
University of North Carolina at Greensboro (UNC Greensboro)	Spartans	Greensboro	North Carolina	State	Southern Conference
Virginia Military Institute (VMI)	Keydets	Lexington	Virginia	State	Southern Conference
Wofford College	Terriers	Spartanburg	South Carolina	Private/Methodist	Southern Conference
University of Delaware	Fightin' Blue Hens	Newark	Delaware	Private-state hybrid	The Summit League
University of Missouri–Kansas City (Kansas City)	Roos	Kansas City	Missouri	State	The Summit League
University of Nebraska Omaha (Omaha)	Mavericks	Omaha	Nebraska	State	The Summit League
Oral Roberts University	Golden Eagles	Tulsa	Oklahoma	Private/Christian	The Summit League
University of St. Thomas	Tommies	Saint Paul	Minnesota	Private/Catholic	The Summit League
University of Massachusetts Amherst (UMass)	Minutemen	Amherst	Massachusetts	State	The Summit League
Coastal Carolina University	Chanticleers	Conway	South Carolina	State	Sun Belt Conference
Georgia Southern University	Eagles	Statesboro	Georgia	State	Sun Belt Conference
Georgia State University	Panthers	Atlanta	Georgia	State	Sun Belt Conference
James Madison University	Dukes	Harrisonburg	Virginia	State	Sun Belt Conference
University of Kentucky	Wildcats	Lexington	Kentucky	State	Sun Belt Conference
Marshall University	Thundering Herd	Huntington	West Virginia	State	Sun Belt Conference
Old Dominion University	Monarchs	Norfolk	Virginia	State	Sun Belt Conference
University of South Carolina	Gamecocks	Columbia	South Carolina	State	Sun Belt Conference
University of Central Florida (UCF)	Knights	Orlando (Note: The main UCF campus has an Orlando mailing address, but is located in unincorporated Orange County.)	Florida	State	Sun Belt Conference
West Virginia University	Mountaineers	Morgantown	West Virginia	State	Sun Belt Conference
University of Denver	Pioneers	Denver	Colorado	Private/Nonsectarian	West Coast Conference
Loyola Marymount University	Lions	Los Angeles	California	Private/Catholic	West Coast Conference
University of the Pacific	Tigers	Stockton	California	Private/Methodist	West Coast Conference
University of Portland	Pilots	Portland	Oregon	Private/Catholic	West Coast Conference
Saint Mary's College of California	Gaels	Moraga	California	Private/Catholic	West Coast Conference
University of San Diego	Toreros	San Diego	California	Private/Catholic	West Coast Conference
University of San Francisco	Dons	San Francisco	California	Private/Catholic	West Coast Conference
Santa Clara University	Broncos	Santa Clara	California	Private/Catholic	West Coast Conference
Seattle University	Redhawks	Seattle	Washington	Private/Catholic	West Coast Conference

Notes

|}
