= 2022 MAAC men's soccer tournament =

- Classification: Division I
- Teams: 6
- Matches: 5
- Attendance: 2,410
- Site: Campus Sites, Hosted by Higher Seed
- Champions: Quinnipiac (2nd title)
- Winning coach: Eric Da Costa (2nd title)
- MVP: Karl Netzell (Quinnipiac)
- Broadcast: ESPN+

2022 Metro Atlantic Athletic Conference men's soccer standings
	Conf.					Overall
Team	W		L		T	W		L		T
Quinnipiac‡	6	–	2	–	2	13	–	5	–	3
Iona	5	–	1	–	4	7	–	5	–	5
Manhattan	5	–	1	–	4	8	–	5	–	6
Siena	4	–	2	–	4	8	–	5	–	6
Niagara	4	–	2	–	4	5	–	9	–	6
Fairfield	4	–	5	–	1	8	–	10	–	1
Marist	3	–	4	–	3	7	–	6	–	4
Rider	2	–	3	–	5	3	–	8	–	6
Mount St. Mary's	3	–	5	–	1	7	–	8	–	1
Saint Peter's	2	–	5	–	3	3	–	10	–	4
Canisius	0	–	7	–	3	1	–	10	–	6
‡ – 2022 MAAC Tournament champion + – At-large invitation to the 2022 NCAA Tournament; As of December 13, 2022; Rankings from United Soccer Coaches; Source: MAAC

The 2022 MAAC men's soccer tournament was the postseason men's soccer tournament for the Metro Atlantic Athletic Conference held from November 6 through November 13, 2022. The five-match tournament took place at campus sites, with the higher seed hosting matches. The host for the matches was determined by seeding from regular season play. The six-team single-elimination tournament consisted of three rounds based on seeding from regular season conference play. The Marist Red Foxes were the defending champions and were unable to defend their title, after a seventh place regular season finish did not qualify them for the tournament. Regular season champion and top seed Quinnipiac would go on to win the tournament, defeating second seed Iona 3–2 in the final. This was Quinnipiac's second overall tournament win and first since 2013. Both of their titles have come under head coach Eric Da Costa. As tournament champions, Quinnipiac earned the MAAC's automatic berth into the 2022 NCAA Division I men's soccer tournament.

== Seeding ==
The top six teams in the regular season earned a spot in the tournament. Teams were seeded based on regular season conference record and tiebreakers were used to determine seedings of teams that finished with the same record. A tiebreaker was required to determine the second and third seeds as Iona and Manhattan finished with identical 5–1–4 regular season records. Iona was awarded the second seed over Manhattan by virtue of their 2–1 victory during the regular season on October 8. A second tiebreaker was required for the fourth and fifth seeds between Niagara and Siena after both teams finished 4–2–4 in the regular season. Niagara earned the fourth seed, and the right to host their opening round match, by winning their regular season match up 2–0 on October 12.

Seed	School	Conference Record	Points
1	Quinnipiac	6–2–2	20
2	Iona	5–1–4	19
3	Manhattan	5–1–4	19
4	Niagara	4–2–4	16
5	Siena	4–2–4	16
6	Fairfield	4–5–1	13

== Bracket ==
Opening Round; Sunday, Nov. 6
3	Manhattan	2
6	Fairfield	0
4	Niagara (pen.)	1 (4)
5	Siena	1 (3)

Semifinals; Thursday, Nov. 10
1	Quinnipiac	5
4	Niagara	2
2	Iona	1
3	Manhattan	0

Final; Sunday, Nov. 13
1	Quinnipiac	3
2	Iona	2

== Schedule ==
=== Opening Round ===
November 6	#3 Manhattan	2–0	#6 Fairfield	New York, NY
4:00 p.m. ET	Gunnar Studenhofft 19'; Ronaldo Da Silva 32', (yellow card) 37'; Ayoub Boumelala (yellow card) 34'	Report	(yellow card) 54' Josephy Stocchetti; (yellow card) 85' Kaea Rangihaeata	Stadium: Gaelic Park; Attendance: 362; Referee: Jose Arana; Assistant referees: Gregory Muhs; Hector Rueda

November 6	#4 Niagara	1–1 (a.e.t.) (4–3 p)	#5 Siena	Lewiston, NY
6:00 p.m. ET	Rodrigo Almeida 3', (yellow card) 39'; Stephen Hasse (yellow card) 69'; Gabriel Mikina (yellow card) 110'	Report	(yellow card) 19' Team; (yellow card) 40', (goal) 80' Magnus Saaby; (yellow card) 56' Thomas Storodegard; (yellow card) 102' Jesper Schone Vogtengen	Stadium: Niagara Field; Attendance: 479; Referee: Shane Magaris; Assistant referees: Patrick Ohara; Jefferson Dargout; Fourth official: William Bainbridge
	Penalties
	Rodrigo Almeida (penalty scored); Stephen Hasse (penalty scored); Jayson Repine (penalty scored); Jordan Acevedo (penalty missed); Gabriel Mikinia (penalty scored)		(penalty scored) Magnus Saaby; (penalty scored) Erik Reis; (penalty scored) Henrik Winkelmann; (penalty missed) Miguel Plaza; (penalty missed) Bilal Hersi

=== Semifinals ===
November 10	#2 Iona	1–0	#3 Manhattan	New Rochelle, NY
12:00 p.m. ET	Matias Morales 3'; Jose Silva (yellow card) 24'; Frederico Russo (yellow card) 27'; Elrid Mero (yellow card) 68'; Team (yellow card) 76'; Camil Azzam Ruiz (yellow card) 77'	Report	(yellow card) 65' Gunnar Studenhofft; (yellow card) 81' Anthony Denis	Stadium: Mazzella Field; Attendance: 325; Referee: Lorato Varga; Assistant referees: Bruno Mozzo; Danny Marques; Fourth official: William Pottorff

November 10	#1 Quinnipiac	5–2	#4 Niagara	Hamden, CT
12:00 p.m. ET	David Bercedo 1', 52'; Thomas Svecula 38', 52', (yellow card) 38'; Alexander Stjernegaard (yellow card) 45'; Luke Allen 56'; Team (yellow card) 58'; Luke Schierenbeck (yellow card) 77'	Report	13', 76' (pen.) Rodrigo Almeida; (yellow card) 22' Jason Repine; (yellow card) 38' Alberto Sanchez Cervera; (yellow card) 45' Jamie Barry; (yellow card) 56' Asher Barnes	Stadium: Quinnipiac Soccer Stadium; Attendance: 802; Referee: Jason Dizek; Assistant referees: Gregory Muhs; Kyle O'Grady; Fourth official: Clovis Da Silva

=== Final ===
November 13	#1 Quinnipiac	3–2	#2 Iona	Hamden, CT
12:00 p.m. ET	David Bercedo 8'; Jared Smith (yellow card) 55'; Noah Silverman 56'; Thomas Svecula 65'; Sander Sonsterud (yellow card) 66'; Karl Netzell (yellow card) 89'	Report	(yellow card) 57' Thiago Cagna; 80', (yellow card) 89' Aly Camara; 89' Elird Mero	Stadium: Quinnipiac Soccer Stadium; Attendance: 442

== Statistics ==
=== Goalscorers ===
3 goals

- Rodrigo Almeida – Niagara
- Daivd Bercedo – Quinnipiac
- Thomas Svecula – Quinnipiac

1 goal

- Aly Camara – Iona
- Elird Mero – Iona
- Matias Morales – Iona
- Ronaldo Da Silva – Manhattan
- Gunnar Studenhofft – Manhattan
- Magnus Saaby – Siena
- Luke Allen – Quinnipiac
- Noah Silverman – Quinnipiac

== All-Tournament team ==
Player	Team
**2022 MAAC Men's Soccer All-Tournament team**
James Cotter	Manhattan
Ensa Sanneh	Manhattan
Rodrigo Almeida	Niagara
Stephen Hasse	Niagara
Tom Fillaudeau	Iona
Juan Alfaro Monge	Iona
Matias Morales	Iona
David Bercedo	Quinnipiac
**Karl Netzell**	Quinnipiac
Alexander Stjernegaard	Quinnipiac
Tomas Svecula	Quinnipiac

MVP in Bold
