= 2024 MAAC men's soccer tournament =

- Classification: Division I
- Teams: 8
- Matches: 7
- Attendance: 2,373
- Site: Campus Sites, Hosted by Higher Seed
- Champions: Iona (2nd title)
- Winning coach: James Hamilton (2nd title)
- MVP: Sergio Gonzalez Fernandez (Iona)
- Broadcast: ESPN+

2024 Metro Atlantic Athletic Conference men's soccer standings
	Conf.					Overall
Team	W		L		T	W		L		T
Iona ‡	6	–	1	–	1	11	–	5	–	3
Rider	6	–	1	–	1	14	–	5	–	1
Siena	4	–	1	–	3	7	–	5	–	6
Quinnipiac	4	–	4	–	0	7	–	9	–	1
Marist	3	–	3	–	2	7	–	9	–	2
Manhattan	3	–	3	–	2	5	–	8	–	3
Sacred Heart	3	–	3	–	2	8	–	6	–	2
Mount St. Mary's	3	–	3	–	2	3	–	11	–	4
Canisius	2	–	3	–	3	4	–	8	–	4
Fairfield	2	–	3	–	3	3	–	9	–	5
Merrimack	2	–	4	–	2	3	–	11	–	2
Saint Peter's	2	–	4	–	2	2	–	10	–	3
Niagara	0	–	7	–	1	2	–	12	–	2
‡ – 2024 MAAC tournament champion + – At-large invitation to the 2023 NCAA tournament; As of December 17, 2024; Rankings from United Soccer Coaches; Source: MAAC

The 2024 MAAC men's soccer tournament was the postseason men's soccer tournament for the Metro Atlantic Athletic Conference held from November 10 through November 17, 2024. The five-match tournament took place at campus sites, with the higher seed hosting each match. The host for the matches was determined by seeding from regular season play. The eight-team single-elimination tournament consisted of three rounds based on seeding from regular season conference play. The Rider Broncs were the defending champions. They were unable defend their title as the second seed in the tournament. They lost in the Final to first seed Iona in overtime 1–0. This was Iona's second overall tournament win, both of which have come under head coach James Hamilton. As tournament champions, Iona earned the MAAC's automatic berth into the 2024 NCAA Division I men's soccer tournament.

== Seeding ==
The top eight teams in the regular season earned a spot in the 2024 tournament. Teams were seeded based on regular season conference record and tiebreakers were used to determine seedings of teams that finished with the same record. A tiebreaker was required to determine the first and second seeds in the tournament as Iona and Rider both finished with 6–1–1 regular season records. Iona defeated Rider 1–0 during the regular season, on September 28. Therefore, Iona earned the first seed. There was a four-way tie for seeds five through eight as Manhattan, Marist, Mount St. Mary's, and Sacred Heart all finished with identical 3–3–2 regular season records. All the teams did not play each other during the regular season, so the team's point totals against common opponents was used as the tiebreaker. Marist was the fifth seed, Manhattan was the sixth seed, Sacred Heart was the seventh seed, and Mount St. Mary's was the eighth seed.

Seed	School	Conference Record	Points
1	Iona	6–1–1	19
2	Rider	6–1–1	19
3	Siena	4–1–3	15
4	Quinnipiac	4–4–0	12
5	Marist	3–3–2	11
6	Manhattan	3–3–2	11
7	Sacred Heart	3–3–2	11
8	Mount St. Mary's	3–3–2	11

== Bracket ==
Quarterfinals; Sunday, Nov. 10
1	Iona	3
8	Mount St. Mary's	0
4	Quinnipiac	1
5	Marist	2
3	Siena	2
6	Manhattan	1
2	Rider (a.e.t)	1
7	Sacred Heart	0

Semifinals; Thursday, Nov. 14
1	Iona	3
5	Marist	1
3	Siena	0
2	Rider	1

Final; Sunday, Nov. 17
1	Iona (a.e.t)	1
2	Rider	0

== Schedule ==
=== Quarterfinals ===
November 10, 2024	#4 Quinnipiac	1–2	#5 Marist	Hamden, CT
12:00 p.m. EST	Joao Pinto (yellow card) 36'; Ramesh Delsouz 72'	Report	18' Arion Ulaj; (yellow card) 40' Stephen Betz; 58' Richard Morel; (red card) 62' Gijs Verheul; (yellow card) 68' Caio Cavaletti	Stadium: Quinnipiac Soccer Stadium; Attendance: 226; Referee: Phil Benson; Assistant referees: David Bork; Erick Piwowarczyk; Fourth official: Frank Severo

November 10, 2024	#3 Siena	2–1	#6 Manhattan	Loudonville, NY
1:00 p.m. EST	Dren Dobruna 33'; Mario Navarro Perez 84'; Benjamin Fogarty (yellow card) 90'	Report	(yellow card) 33' Thiago da Silva; (yellow card) 54' Ensa Sanneh; 58' Sebastiano Musu; (yellow card) 85' Ziv Dahan	Stadium: Hickey Field; Attendance: 355; Referee: Patrick Violette; Assistant referees: William Ferris; Aaron Selenica; Fourth official: Benjamin Russell

November 10, 2024	#1 Iona	3–0	#8 Mount St. Mary's	New Rochelle, NY
1:00 p.m. EST	Jad Benjelloun 31'; Thiago Cagna 36'; Alvaro Maneiro (yellow card) 48'; Bautista Rossi 85'	Report	(yellow card) 39' Luciano Schiaffini	Stadium: Mazzella Field; Attendance: 246; Referee: Mike De Felice; Assistant referees: Max Moya; Brendan Quinn; Fourth official: Stephen Cope

November 10, 2024	#2 Rider	1–0 (a.e.t.)	#7 Sacred Heart	Lawrenceville, NJ
2:00 p.m. EST	Max Schrader (yellow card) 8'; Andrew Erickson (yellow card) 44'; Jack McGeechan (yellow card) 86'; Bryan Akongo (yellow card) 98'; Cole Sotack 102'	Report	(yellow card) 4' Ivan Marques; (yellow card) 34' Pablo Alcoba; (yellow card) 66' Ivan Breki Sigurdsson	Stadium: Ben Cohen Field; Attendance: 150; Referee: Nathaniel Hirschman; Assistant referees: Hector Rueda; Anthony Procopio Jr. Fourth official: Michael McBride

=== Semifinals ===
November 14, 2024	#1 Iona	3–1	#5 Marist	New Rochelle, NY
1:00 p.m. EST	Francesco Borla 9', (yellow card) 90'; Bautista Rossi 37', (yellow card) 61'; Jose Silva 65'; Tim Timchenko (yellow card) 68'; Ricardo Senen Pinillos (yellow card) 81'	Report	(yellow card) 43' Chris Verhuel; (yellow card) 43' Team; 68' Richard Morel; (yellow card) 81' Joseph Daher	Stadium: Mazzella Field; Attendance: 256; Referee: Cedric Cook; Assistant referees: Hector Rueda; Adrian Rusu; Fourth official: Gregory Solomon

November 14, 2024	#2 Rider	1–0	#3 Siena	Lawrenceville, NJ
7:00 p.m. EST	Martin Chladek (yellow card) 21'; Momo Diop 55'	Report	(yellow card) 39' Cole Hellert; (yellow card) 55' Eric Svensson	Stadium: Ben Cohen Field; Attendance: 520; Referee: Mike De Felice; Assistant referees: Ricardo Barreto; David Bork; Fourth official: Edin Hadzovic

=== Final ===
November 17, 2024	#1 Iona	1–0 (a.e.t.)	#2 Rider	New Rochelle, NY
1:00 p.m. EST	Elird Mero (yellow card) 29'; Bautista Rossi (yellow card) 37', 95'; Jad Benjelloun (yellow card) 68' (yellow-red card) 88'	Report	(yellow card) 68' Adel Al Masude; (yellow card) 90' Bryan Akongo	Stadium: Mazzella Field; Attendance: 620; Referee: Gregory DeMello; Assistant referees: Ricardo Barreto; Anthony McMyne; Fourth official: Franco Somma

== Statistics ==
=== Goalscorers ===
There were 16 goals scored in 5 matches, for an average of 3.2 goals per match (as of November 17, 2024).

3 goals

- Bautista Rossi – Iona

2 goals

- Richard Morel – Marist

1 goal

- Francesco Borla – Iona
- Momo Diop – Rider
- Bautista Rossi – Iona
- Thiago Cagna – Iona
- Ramesh Delsouz – Quinnipiac
- Dren Dobruna – Siena
- Sebastiano Musu – Manhattan
- Mario Navarro Perez – Siena
- Jose Silva – Iona
- Cole Sotack – Rider
- Arion Ulaj – Marist

== All-Tournament team ==
Player	Team
**2024 MAAC Men's Soccer All-Tournament team**
Thiago Cagna	Iona
**Sergio Gonzalez Fernandez**	Iona
Bautista Rossi	Iona
Tim Timchenko	Iona
Joseph Daher	Marist
Richard Morel	Marist
Momo Diop	Rider
Adam Salama	Rider
Cole Sotack	Rider
Tomislav Vrdoljak	Siena
Henrik Winkelmann	Siena

MVP in Bold
