= 2023 MAAC men's soccer tournament =

- Classification: Division I
- Teams: 6
- Matches: 5
- Attendance: 1,677
- Site: Campus Sites, Hosted by Higher Seed
- Champions: Rider (6th title)
- Winning coach: Chad Duernberger (1st title)
- MVP: Momo Diop (Rider)
- Broadcast: ESPN+

2023 Metro Atlantic Athletic Conference men's soccer standings
	Conf.					Overall
Team	W		L		T	W		L		T
Iona	9	–	1	–	0	12	–	4	–	0
Siena	8	–	2	–	0	8	–	9	–	0
Rider ‡	6	–	2	–	2	12	–	4	–	4
Manhattan	6	–	3	–	1	7	–	8	–	3
Niagara	4	–	4	–	2	4	–	10	–	3
Marist	4	–	4	–	2	6	–	8	–	3
Fairfield	3	–	6	–	1	6	–	9	–	1
Mount St. Mary's	2	–	6	–	2	2	–	10	–	3
Quinnipiac	1	–	5	–	4	3	–	9	–	5
Saint Peter's	1	–	6	–	3	2	–	9	–	5
Canisius	1	–	6	–	3	2	–	11	–	5
‡ – 2023 MAAC tournament champion + – At-large invitation to the 2023 NCAA tournament; As of December 12, 2023; Rankings from United Soccer Coaches; Source: MAAC

The 2023 MAAC men's soccer tournament was the postseason men's soccer tournament for the Metro Atlantic Athletic Conference held from November 5 through November 12, 2023. The five-match tournament took place at campus sites, with the higher seed hosting matches. The host for the matches was determined by seeding from regular season play. The six-team single-elimination tournament consisted of three rounds based on seeding from regular season conference play. The Quinnipiac Bobcats were the defending champions. They were unable defend their title as a ninth place regular season finish did not qualify them for the tournament. The Rider Broncs would go on to win the tournament, defeating top seed Iona 2–1 in the final. This was Rider's sixth overall tournament win. Head coach Chad Duernberger won his first tournament title in his first year at the helm of Rider. As tournament champions, Rider earned the MAAC's automatic berth into the 2023 NCAA Division I men's soccer tournament.

== Seeding ==
The top six teams in the regular season earned a spot in the 2023 tournament. Teams were seeded based on regular season conference record and tiebreakers were used to determine seedings of teams that finished with the same record. A tiebreaker was required to determine the fifth and sixth seeds for the tournament as Marist and Niagara finished with identical 4–4–2 regular season records. The teams tied 1–1 in their regular season match up on September 23. Record against highest remaining seeded teams was the second tiebreaker. Both teams lost to the top three seeds, but Niagara defeated fourth seed Manhattan, while Marist lost to Manhattan during the regular season. Therefore, Niagara was the fifth seed while Marist was the sixth seed.

Seed	School	Conference Record	Points
1	Iona	9–1–0	27
2	Siena	8–2–0	24
3	Rider	6–2–2	20
4	Manhattan	6–3–1	19
5	Niagara	4–4–2	14
6	Marist	4–4–2	14

== Bracket ==
Opening Round; Sunday, Nov. 5
4	Manhattan	2
5	Niagara	0
3	Rider	3
6	Marist	1

Semifinals; Thursday, Nov. 9
1	Iona	1
4	Manhattan	0
2	Siena	0
3	Rider	2

Final; Sunday, Nov. 12
1	Iona	1
3	Rider	2

== Schedule ==
=== Opening Round ===
November 5	#3 Rider	3–1	#6 Marist	Lawrenceville, NJ
1:00 p.m. ET	Babacar Diene 15'; Momo Diop 39'; Zaki Alibou (yellow card) 56'; Martin Chladek (yellow card) 62'; Luke Kirilenko 63'; Adam Salama (yellow card) 87'	Report	(yellow card) 40' Kyle Evans; (yellow card) 74' Joseph Daher; (yellow card) 80' Adam Rustami; 84' (pen.) Jared Juleau; (yellow card) 87' Albion Bacaj; (yellow card) 89' (yellow-red card) 90' Jared Juleau	Stadium: Ben Cohen Field; Attendance: 325; Referee: Tyler McElhinney; Assistant referees: Andrew Laplante; Rob Komorowski; Fourth official: Nick Mykulak

November 5	#4 Manhattan	2–0	#5 Niagara	New York, NY
4:00 p.m. ET	Sebastian Musu 37'; Gunnar Studenhofft (yellow card) 38'; Henry Hamilton 82'	Report	(yellow card) 17' Asher Barnes; (yellow card) 37' Felix Kogler; (yellow card) 68' Thomas Brooks	Stadium: Gaelic Park; Attendance: 427; Referee: Yevgeniy Megnikod; Assistant referees: Alex Riseones; Greg Muhs; Fourth official: Jan Halaska

=== Semifinals ===
November 9	#1 Iona	1–0	#4 Manhattan	New Rochelle, NY
1:00 p.m. ET	Thiago Cagna 18'; Matias Morales (yellow card) 38'; Alessio Hernandez (yellow card) 44'; Aly Camara (yellow card) 45'; Elird Mero (yellow card) 89' (yellow-red card) 89'	Report	(yellow card) 25' Henry Hamilton; (yellow card) 55' (yellow-red card) 81' Gunnar Studenhofft; (yellow card) 75' Ensa Sanneh	Stadium: Mazzella Field; Attendance: 400; Referee: Andrea Pileri; Assistant referees: Giovanni Lepore; Hector Rudea; Fourth official: William Pottorff

November 9	#2 Siena	0–2	#3 Rider	Loudonville, NY
1:00 p.m. ET	Magnus Saaby (yellow card) 71'; Thomas Sams (yellow card) 71'	Report	37' Zaki Alibou; 38' Momo Diop; (yellow card) 64' Jack McGeechan	Stadium: Hickey Field; Attendance: 233; Referee: Luis Reis; Assistant referees: George Frascione; Sam Conroy; Fourth official: Matthew Altman

=== Final ===
November 12	#1 Iona	1–2	#3 Rider	New Rochelle, NY
12:00 p.m. ET	Thiago Cagna 48'	Report	36' (yellow card) 67' Momo Diop; 83' Babacar Diene	Stadium: Mazzella Field; Attendance: 292; Referee: Victor Borges; Assistant referees: Daniel Rego; Adrian Rusu; Fourth official: Marcus Garcia

== Statistics ==
=== Goalscorers ===
There were 12 goals scored in 5 matches, for an average of 2.4 goals per match (as of November 12, 2023).

3 goals

- Momo Diop – Rider

2 goals

- Thiago Cagna – Iona
- Babacar Diene – Rider

1 goal

- Henry Hamilton – Manhattan
- Sebastian Musu – Manhattan
- Jared Juleau – Marist
- Zaki Alibou – Rider
- Luke Kirilenko – Rider

== All-Tournament team ==
Player	Team
**2023 MAAC Men's Soccer All-Tournament team**
Camil Azzam Ruiz	Iona
Thiago Cagna	Iona
Tim Timchenko	Iona
James Cotter	Manhattan
Ensa Sanneh	Manhattan
Zaki Alibou	Rider
Babacar Diene	Rider
**Momo Diop**	Rider
Sebastian Rojek	Rider
Magnus Saaby	Siena
Henrik Winkelmann	Siena

MVP in Bold
