= 2021 MAAC men's soccer tournament =

- Classification: Division I
- Teams: 8
- Matches: 7
- Attendance: 4,217
- Site: Campus Sites, Hosted by Higher Seed
- Champions: Marist (4th title)
- Winning coach: Matt Viggiano (1st title)
- MVP: Kyle Galloway (Marist)
- Broadcast: ESPN+

2021 Metro Atlantic Athletic Conference men's soccer standings
	Conf.					Overall
Team	W		L		T	W		L		T
Marist ‡	7	–	2	–	1	12	–	7	–	3
Saint Peter's	6	–	3	–	1	8	–	9	–	1
Niagara	6	–	4	–	0	8	–	10	–	0
Siena	5	–	3	–	2	9	–	7	–	3
Rider	5	–	4	–	1	10	–	7	–	3
Fairfield	5	–	4	–	1	7	–	9	–	2
Monmouth	5	–	5	–	0	8	–	9	–	2
Manhattan	4	–	5	–	1	6	–	9	–	2
Quinnipiac	4	–	6	–	0	9	–	8	–	0
Iona	3	–	6	–	1	6	–	9	–	2
Canisius	1	–	9	–	0	1	–	14	–	2
‡ – 2021 MAAC Tournament champion + – At-large invitation to the 2021 NCAA tournament; As of December 14, 2021; Rankings from United Soccer Coaches; Source: MAAC

The 2021 MAAC men's soccer tournament was the postseason men's soccer tournament for the Metro Atlantic Athletic Conference held from November 7 through November 14, 2021. The seven-match tournament took place at campus sites, with the higher seed hosting matches. The host for the matches was determined by seeding from regular season play. The eight-team single-elimination tournament consisted of three rounds based on seeding from regular season conference play. The Monmouth were the defending champions and were unable to defend their title, losing to Marist in the semifinals. Marist went on to win the Championship, defeating Rider in a penalty shoot-out in the final. This is Marist's fourth overall tournament win and first since 2005. The title is also the first for head coach Matt Viggiano. As tournament champions, Marist earned the MAAC's automatic berth into the 2021 NCAA Division I men's soccer tournament.

== Seeding ==
The top eight teams in the regular season earned a spot in the tournament. Teams were seeded based on regular season conference record and tiebreakers were used to determine seedings of teams that finished with the same record. A tiebreaker was required to determine the fifth and sixth seed as Rider and Fairfield each finished with a 5–4–1 conference record. Rider earned the fifth seed by virtue of their 4–3 victory over Fairfield on October 20.

Seed	School	Conference Record	Points
1	Marist	7–2–1	22
2	Saint Peter's	6–3–1	19
3	Niagara	6–4–0	18
4	Siena	5–3–2	17
5	Rider	5–4–1	16
6	Fairfield	5–4–1	16
7	Monmouth	5–5–0	15
8	Manhattan	4–5–1	13

== Bracket ==
Quarterfinals; Sunday, Nov. 7
1	Marist	3
8	Manhattan	0
4	Siena	0
5	Rider	1
(Pairings are reseeded after the first round)
2	Saint Peter's	0
7	Monmouth	1
3	Niagara	0
6	Fairfield	2

Semifinals; Thursday, Nov. 11
1	Marist	1
7	Monmouth	0
5	Rider (a.e.t.)	2
6	Fairfield	1

Final; Sunday, Nov. 14
1	Marist (pen.)	2 (5)
5	Rider	2 (3)

== Schedule ==
=== Quarterfinals ===
November 7, 2021	#2 Saint Peter's	0–1	#7 Monmouth	Jersey City, NJ
1:00 p.m. ET	Anton Moore (yellow card) 14'	Report	(yellow card) 43' Nick Rogers; (yellow card) 79' Luke McBeth; 90' Julian Gomez	Stadium: Jaroschak Field; Attendance: 500; Referee: Victor Borges; Assistant referees: Lev Dashev; Cory Pedalino; Fourth official: Ernest Zielinksi

November 7, 2021	#4 Siena	0–1	#5 Rider	Loudonville, NY
1:00 p.m. ET	Jack Mendrysa (yellow card) 35'; Erik Reis (yellow card) 36'; Thomas Sams (yellow card) 50'	Report	5' Francis Gomez Olano; (yellow card) 38' Brendan Fischer; (red card) 38' Patrick Luckie; (yellow card) 45' Zaki Alibou	Stadium: Hickey Field; Attendance: 390; Referee: Matthew Mercier; Assistant referees: Hao Zhong; Ron Gecsedi

November 7, 2021	#3 Niagara	0–2	#6 Fairfield	Lewiston, NY
2:00 p.m. ET	Jayson Repine (yellow card) 16'; Josh Tufino (yellow card) 61'; Stephen Hasse (yellow card) 89'	Report	5' Rasmus Sorensen Rejnhold; (yellow card) 46' Jonathan Puzzo; (yellow card) 75' Daniel Raimondo; 79' Santiago Gonzalez; (yellow card) 89' Thomas Drillen	Stadium: Niagara Field; Attendance: 307; Referee: Shane Magaris; Assistant referees: Patrick O'Hara; Franco Bevilacqua; Fourth official: Ian Boyle

November 7, 2021	#1 Marist	3–0	#8 Manhattan	Poughkeepsie, NY
5:00 p.m. ET	Kyle Galloway 51', 59'; Liam Salmon 78'	Report	(yellow card) 59' Brandon Joseph-Buadi	Stadium: Leonidoff Field; Attendance: 1,342; Referee: Tony Russo; Assistant referees: Colby Johnson; Daniel Rego; Fourth official: Daniel Aloi

=== Semifinals ===
November 11, 2021	#1 Marist	1–0	#7 Monmouth	Poughkeepsie, NY
7:00 p.m. ET	Andre Cutler-DeJesus (yellow card) 36'; Bernardo Gracindo 81'; Liam Salmon (yellow card) 90'	Report	(yellow card) 69' Jonas Linder	Stadium: Leonidoff Field; Attendance: 700; Referee: Lorant Varga; Assistant referees: David Breckner; Daniel Aloi; Fourth official: Victor Borges

November 11, 2021	#5 Rider	2–1 (a.e.t.)	#6 Fairfield	Lawrenceville, NJ
7:00 p.m. ET	Regis Dulck (yellow card) 23'; Francis Gomez Olano (yellow card) 30'; Pavia Vidal Guiller 67', (yellow card) 69'; Jack McGeechan (red card) 85'; Team (yellow card) 97'; Adel Al-Masude (yellow card) 104'; Taner Bay 109'	Report	(yellow card) 31' (yellow-red card) 60' Joseph Stocchetti; 34' Thomas Drillien; (yellow card) 59' Daniel Raimondo	Stadium: Ben Cohen Field; Attendance: 205; Referee: Mike De Felice; Assistant referees: Pete Mandell; Cory Pedalino; Fourth official: Larry Urwiler

=== Final ===
November 14, 2021	#1 Marist	2–2 (a.e.t.) (5–3 p)	#5 Rider	Poughkeepsie, NY
11:00 a.m. ET	Justin Scharf 18'; Justin Jaime (yellow card) 19'; Kyle Galloway 22'	Report	28' Tyrrell Moore; (yellow card) 29' Pablo Gatinois; 49' (o.g.) Marist Own Goal; (yellow card) 68' Francisco Gomez Olano; (yellow card) 83' Kevin Peprah; (yellow card) 98' Adel Al-Masude	Stadium: Leonidoff Field; Attendance: 773; Referee: Lorant Varga; Assistant referees: David Breckner; Lev Dashev; Fourth official: Victor Borges
	Penalties
	Huib Achterkamp (penalty scored); Henrique Cruz (penalty scored); Bernardo Gracindo (penalty scored); Kyle Galloway (penalty scored); Jacob Schulman (penalty scored)		(penalty scored) Taner Bay; (penalty scored) Adel Al-Masude; (penalty scored) Guillaume Sarrabayrousse; (penalty missed) Regis Dulck

== Statistics ==
=== Goalscorers ===
There were 15 goals scored in 7 matches, for an average of 2.14 goals per match (as of November 14, 2021).

2 goals

- Kyle Galloway – Marist

1 goal

- Thomas Drillien – Fairfield
- Santiago Gonzalez – Fairfield
- Rasmus Sorensen Rejnhold – Fairfield
- Kyle Galloway – Marist
- Bernardo Gracindo – Marist
- Liam Salmon – Marist
- Justin Scharf – Marist
- Julian Gomez – Monmouth
- Tanner Bay – Rider
- Pavia Vidal Guiller – Rider
- Tyrell Moore – Rider
- Francis Gomez Olano – Rider

1 own goal

- Marist (against Rider)

== All-Tournament team ==
Player	Team
**2021 MAAC Men's Soccer All-Tournament team**
Thomas Drillien	Fairfield
Cormac Pike	Fairfield
George Akampeke	Monmouth
Luke McBeth	Monmouth
Taner Bay	Rider
Regis Dulck	Rider
Pablo Gatinois	Rider
Demarre Montoute	Marist
Henrique Cruz	Marist
Bernardo Gracidno	Marist
**Kyle Galloway**	Marist

MVP in Bold
