= 2015 MAAC men's soccer tournament =

Tournament details
- Country: United States
- Teams: 11

Final positions
- Champions: Rider
- Runners-up: Monmouth

Tournament statistics
- Matches played: 10
- Goals scored: 24 (2.4 per match)

Awards
- Best player: Elliot Otmani

The 2015 Metro Atlantic Athletic Conference men's soccer tournament was the 23rd edition of the tournament. It determined the Metro Atlantic Athletic Conference's automatic berth into the 2015 NCAA Division I Men's Soccer Championship.

The Rider Broncs won the tournament, besting the Monmouth Hawks in the championship match.

== Qualification ==
2015 Metro Atlantic Athletic Conference men's soccer standings
	Conf.					Overall
Team	W		L		T	W		L		T
Monmouth	7	–	0	–	3	13	–	4	–	4
Rider ‡	6	–	3	–	1	14	–	6	–	1
Iona	5	–	3	–	2	10	–	7	–	3
Marist	5	–	3	–	2	7	–	9	–	2
Fairfield	5	–	3	–	2	6	–	6	–	6
Siena	5	–	4	–	1	8	–	10	–	3
Canisius	5	–	5	–	0	8	–	9	–	1
Saint Peter's	4	–	5	–	1	7	–	9	–	2
Manhattan	3	–	6	–	1	4	–	11	–	2
Quinnipiac	1	–	5	–	4	2	–	11	–	6
Niagara	0	–	9	–	1	1	–	16	–	3
‡-2015 MAAC Tournament Champion +- Invited to the NCAA Division I Men's Soccer Championship; As of November 20, 2015; Rankings from NSCAA

All teams in the Metro Atlantic Athletic Conference qualified for the tournament.

== Bracket ==
First round
8	Manhattan	1
9	Saint Peter's	0
7	Canisius	0
10	Quinnipiac	1
6	Siena	1
11	Niagara	0

Quarterfinals
1	Monmouth	2
9	Manhattan	1
4	Fairfield	0
5	Iona	1
2	Rider	3
10	Quinnipiac	0
3	Marist	0
6	Siena	1

Semifinals
1	Monmouth	2
5	Iona	1
2	Rider	3
6	Siena	2

Final
1	Monmouth	2
2	Rider	3

== Schedule ==
=== First round ===
November 5	Siena	1–0	Niagara	Lake Buena Vista, Florida
11:00 AM ET	Gadze 60'	Report		Stadium: ESPN Wide World of Sports Complex Field 17; Attendance: 323; Referee: Tony Baumert

November 5	Canisius	0–1	Quinnipiac	Lake Buena Vista, Florida
12:30 PM ET		Report	Rothenbucher 16'	Stadium: ESPN Wide World of Sports Complex Field 18; Attendance: 100; Referee: Sean Morey

November 5	Saint Peter's	0–1	Manhattan	Lake Buena Vista, Florida
2:00 PM ET		Report	Shackley 90'	Stadium: ESPN Wide World of Sports Complex Field 17; Attendance: 352; Referee: Martin Bel

=== Quarter-finals ===
November 6	Marist	0–1	Siena	Lake Buena Vista, Florida
11:00 AM ET		Report	Riccardi 51'	Stadium: ESPN Wide World of Sports Complex Field 18; Attendance: 357; Referee: Chi Chi Ogbenta

November 6	Rider	3–0	Quinnipiac	Lake Buena Vista, Florida
11:15 AM ET	Halliday 47'; Flath 57'; Duffy 79'	Report		Stadium: ESPN Wide World of Sports Complex Field 17; Attendance: 412; Referee: Martin Bel

November 6	Fairfield	0–1	Iona	Lake Buena Vista, Florida
2:00 PM ET		Report	Gonzalez 41'	Stadium: ESPN Wide World of Sports Complex Field 18; Attendance: 112; Referee: Abdel Kuttaineh

November 6	Monmouth	2–1	Manhattan	Lake Buena Vista, Florida
2:15 PM ET	Alves 9'; Camacho 87'	Report	Phillips 47'	Stadium: ESPN Wide World of Sports Complex Field 17; Attendance: 386; Referee: Alex Sorondo

=== Semi-finals ===
November 8	Monmouth	2–1	Iona	Lake Buena Vista, Florida
11:00 AM ET	Pereira 22'; Pizzimenti 43'	Report	Ferrandino 54'	Stadium: ESPN Wide World of Sports Complex Field 17; Attendance: 386; Referee: Martin Bel

November 8	Rider	3–2	Siena	Lake Buena Vista, Florida
2:00 PM ET	Aguinaga 6'; Otmani 17', 84'	Report	Curto 47'; Needham 85'	Stadium: ESPN Wide World of Sports Complex Field 17; Attendance: 402; Referee: Alex Sorondo

=== Final ===
November 9	Monmouth	2–3	Rider	Lake Buena Vista, Florida
12:00 PM ET	Pereira 79'; Figarella 89'	Report	Fryc 44'; Otmani 55'; Freeman 80'	Stadium: ESPN Wide World of Sports Complex Field 17; Attendance: 424; Referee: Hassan Balmnahia

== Statistical leaders ==
=== Top goalscorers ===
Rank	Player	College	Goals

As of 11 December 2015

== See also ==
- Metro Atlantic Athletic Conference
- 2015 Metro Atlantic Athletic Conference men's soccer season
- 2015 NCAA Division I men's soccer season
- 2015 NCAA Division I Men's Soccer Championship
