= NCAA Division I men's soccer tournament all-time team records =

The following is a list of National Collegiate Athletic Association (NCAA) Division I college soccer team statistics through the 2025 NCAA Division I Men's Soccer Championship, including all-time number of wins, losses, and draws; number of tournaments played; and percent of games won.

== Team Records ==
- Most Single Team Goals, Single Game: 9
  - Saint Louis (vs. Stanford–3, 1962)
  - Michigan State (vs. Howard–1, 1962)
  - Howard (vs. Duke-0, 1972)
  - Appalachian State (vs. George Washington–3, 1978)
- Most Combined Goals, Single Game: 12
  - Saint Louis 9, Stanford 3, 1962
  - Appalachian State 9, George Washington 3, 1978
- Most Goals, Tournament: 17
  - Clemson, 1976
  - Clemson, 1978
  - UCLA, 2002
- Most Shots, Game: 54
  - Connecticut 2, Rhode Island 3 (4OT), 1979
- Most Corner Kicks, Game: 20
  - Connecticut 2, Hartford 1 (4OT), 1999
- Most Fouls, Game: 50
  - Connecticut 2, Rhode Island 3 (4OT), 1979
  - Indiana 1, UC Santa Barbara 1 (2OT/PK), 2004
- Goals Per Game, Tournament (minimum 2 games): 5.00
  - Saint Louis (15 goals, 3 games), 1959
  - Saint Louis (15 goals, 3 games), 1962
  - Appalachian State (10 goals, 2 games), 1978
- Lowest Goals-Against Average Tournament (minimum 3 games): 0.00
  - San Francisco (0 goals against, 4 games), 1976
  - Wisconsin (0 goals against, 5 games), 1995
  - Akron (0 goals against, 5 games), 2009
  - Stanford (0 goals against, 5 games) 2016, 2017
  - Maryland (0 goals against, 5 games) 2018
- Overtime Games, Tournament: 5
  - Alabama A&M, 1981
- Longest Game: 166 minutes, 5 seconds
  - UCLA 1, American 0 (8OT), 1985

== Career win-loss record by alphabetical order ==
as of end of 2025 Tournament

- school indicates schools belonging to Division II, school indicates schools belonging to Division III.
- school indicates a school that no longer sponsors men's soccer.
- **School** indicates they have won at least one championship.
- Other **bold** indicates most in respective column.
- Games ended in penalty shootout are all included in D (draw).

Team	App	GP	W	L	D	GF	GA	GD	Note
Adelphi	10	12	2	8	2	10	24	-14	
Air Force	14	19	5	14	0	26	42	-16	
**Akron**	33	69	32	26	11	107	89	18	
Alabama A&M	5	14	8	5	1	19	16	3	
Albany	2	4	1	2	1	4	5	-1	
American	9	21	11	8	2	25	19	6	
Appalachian State	4	6	2	4	0	13	13	0	
Army	12	22	9	12	1	44	54	-10	
Baltimore	1	1	0	1	0	0	7	-7	
Binghamton	2	3	1	2	0	2	3	-1	
Boston College	15	26	9	12	5	33	42	-9	
Boston University	16	23	5	16	2	29	50	-21	
Bowling Green	8	11	3	8	0	8	22	-14	
Bradley	7	14	6	7	1	15	23	-8	
Bridgeport	12	18	6	12	0	29	47	-18	
Brockport	2	2	0	1	1	4	6	-2	
Brooklyn	3	4	1	3	0	6	8	-2	
Brown	27	64	35	28	1	112	104	8	
Bryant	2	3	1	1	1	3	3	0	
Bucknell	8	11	3	8	0	4	20	-16	
Buffalo State	2	3	1	2	0	4	5	-1	
Butler	9	13	4	8	1	12	21	-9	
California	20	34	13	19	2	47	57	-10	
California Baptist	2	3	0	2	1	2	6	-4	
Cal Poly	3	4	1	3	0	2	7	-5	
Cal State Fullerton	10	17	7	9	1	21	26	-5	
Cal State Northridge	7	8	1	6	1	5	10	-5	
Campbell	4	5	1	4	0	5	11	-6	
CCNY	1	2	1	1	0	3	6	-3	
Central Arkansas	2	2	0	2	0	0	6	-6	
Central Connecticut	1	3	2	1	0	7	7	0	
Charleston	5	9	4	5	0	18	22	-4	
Charleston Southern	1	1	0	1	0	0	3	-3	
Charlotte	18	31	10	15	6	35	43	-8	
Chico State	2	2	0	2	0	3	8	-5	
Cincinnati	3	3	0	2	1	0	4	-4	
**Clemson**	38	103	63	29	11	199	120	79	
Cleveland State	11	15	4	11	0	16	32	-16	
Coastal Carolina	17	32	15	15	2	46	46	0	
Colgate	8	11	3	8	0	14	24	-10	
Colorado College	3	3	0	3	0	2	12	-10	
Columbia	14	27	12	15	0	43	45	-2	
Cornell	13	24	11	13	0	37	38	-1	
Cortland	3	3	0	3	0	7	14	-7	
Creighton	26	68	39	22	7	120	72	48	
CSU Bakersfield	1	1	0	1	0	0	1	-1	
Dartmouth	18	29	9	15	5	31	49	-18	
Davidson	2	5	1	2	2	5	8	-3	
Dayton	4	6	1	2	3	9	10	-1	
Delaware	5	6	1	5	0	5	10	-5	
Denver	14	25	11	11	3	29	27	2	
DePaul	1	1	0	1	0	0	2	-2	
Detroit Mercy	1	1	0	1	0	0	4	-4	
Drake	3	7	4	3	0	13	14	-1	
Drexel	4	4	0	4	0	3	16	-13	
**Duke**	32	69	36	30	3	108	108	0	
Eastern Illinois	2	2	0	2	0	1	3	-2	1981 appearance was vacated
East Stroudsburg State	3	5	2	3	0	9	8	1	
East Tennessee State	3	3	0	3	0	2	6	-4	
Elon	6	8	1	5	2	9	18	-9	
Evansville	12	17	4	11	2	15	29	-14	
Fairfield	4	5	1	4	0	4	10	-6	
Fairleigh Dickinson	19	31	11	19	1	30	48	-18	
FIU	13	23	8	13	2	34	34	0	
Florida Atlantic	1	1	0	1	0	2	3	-1	
Florida Gulf Coast	4	5	0	3	2	4	7	-3	
Fordham	6	9	2	6	1	12	20	-8	
Franklin & Marshall	1	1	0	1	0	0	6	-6	
Fresno State	14	24	8	13	3	20	35	-15	
Furman	13	25	7	11	7	26	33	-7	
Gardner-Webb	2	4	1	2	1	3	7	-4	
George Mason	11	17	5	11	1	12	24	-12	
**Georgetown**	16	39	20	12	7	70	45	25	
George Washington	6	8	2	6	0	7	23	-16	
Georgia State	3	4	1	2	1	3	5	-2	
Gonzaga	2	2	0	2	0	0	2	-2	
Grand Canyon	4	6	1	3	2	3	6	-3	
Green Bay	3	3	0	3	0	1	12	-11	
Hartford	4	7	3	4	0	10	14	-4	
**Hartwick**	25	61	35	25	1	114	87	27	
Harvard	16	36	19	15	2	67	50	17	
High Point	5	7	2	5	0	8	16	-8	
Hofstra	10	18	8	8	2	35	39	-4	
Holy Cross	1	1	0	0	1	1	1	0	Career unbeaten record
**Howard**	11	28	15	10	3	53	44	9	1970 and 1971 (win) appearances were vacated
Illinois State	1	1	0	1	0	1	2	-1	
**Indiana**	50	**150**	**104**	38	8	**274**	121	**153**	
Iona	2	2	0	2	0	0	9	-9	
Ithaca	1	1	0	1	0	1	2	-1	
IUPUI	1	1	0	1	0	0	2	-2	
Jacksonville	3	5	2	2	1	8	10	-2	
James Madison	16	26	9	16	1	32	59	-27	
Kansas City	5	9	4	5	0	10	15	-5	
Kentucky	15	25	8	15	2	28	31	-3	
Lafayatte	6	7	1	6	0	2	18	-16	
La Salle	1	1	0	1	0	1	5	-4	
Lehigh	5	6	0	4	2	3	14	-11	
Liberty	2	2	0	1	1	0	2	-2	
Lindenwood	1	1	0	1	0	0	1	-1	
Lipscomb	5	7	1	5	1	5	11	-6	
Long Island	18	27	8	16	3	42	60	-18	These records include both LIU Brooklyn and Long Island University
Louisville	15	33	17	14	2	55	48	7	
Loyola (MD)	9	16	7	7	2	13	14	-1	
Loyola Chicago	5	6	1	4	1	4	6	-2	
Loyola Marymount	9	14	5	7	2	16	20	-4	
Marist	3	3	0	3	0	2	7	-5	
Marquette	4	6	1	4	1	3	7	-4	
**Marshall**	7	20	12	6	2	27	21	6	
**Maryland**	42	105	62	34	9	202	136	66	
Memphis	4	5	1	4	0	4	14	-10	
Mercer	6	6	0	6	0	2	9	-7	
Michigan	10	21	8	9	4	31	31	0	
**Michigan State**	20	50	28	13	9	94	56	38	
Middlebury	2	2	0	2	0	1	3	-2	
Milwaukee	10	14	4	9	1	21	28	-7	
Missouri State	9	12	3	9	0	11	19	-8	
Monmouth	6	9	1	6	2	5	19	-14	
Monclair State	1	1	0	1	0	0	3	-3	
**Navy**	12	26	15	11	0	55	36	19	
NC State	18	31	12	17	2	49	57	-8	
New Hampshire	8	14	5	7	2	19	18	1	
New Mexico	12	26	12	10	4	29	30	-1	
Niagara	1	1	0	1	0	1	3	-2	
NJIT	1	1	0	1	0	0	2	-2	
**North Carolina**	32	82	43	25	14	113	91	22	
Northeastern	2	4	1	2	1	3	4	-1	
Northern Illinois	4	7	3	4	0	8	13	-5	
North Florida	3	3	0	2	1	3	5	-2	
North Texas State	1	2	1	1	0	1	1	0	
Northwestern	9	19	9	9	1	25	23	2	
**Notre Dame**	25	53	24	22	7	68	52	16	
NYU	3	4	1	3	0	5	7	-2	
Oakland	8	10	2	6	2	11	15	-4	
Ohio	3	4	1	3	0	5	11	-6	
Ohio State	12	26	9	12	5	31	28	3	
Old Dominion	14	25	9	13	3	30	33	-3	
Omaha	3	4	1	3	0	3	6	-3	
Oneonta	3	4	1	3	0	2	5	-3	
Oregon State	10	18	8	9	1	25	20	5	
Pacific	3	6	3	2	1	4	4	0	
Penn	12	22	10	11	1	33	29	4	
Penn State	35	64	28	32	4	97	117	-20	
Philadelphia Textile	16	37	19	16	2	74	64	10	
Pittsburgh	8	20	12	7	1	42	27	15	
Portland	20	41	20	16	7	49	51	-2	
Presbyterian	1	1	0	1	0	0	1	-1	
Princeton	13	17	4	12	1	19	26	-7	
Providence	12	27	14	12	1	44	41	3	
Quinnipiac	2	2	0	2	0	3	5	-2	
Radford	2	2	0	2	0	2	4	-2	
Rhode Island	13	17	3	12	2	23	37	-14	
Richmond	3	3	0	3	0	1	6	-5	
Rider	6	6	0	6	0	3	16	-13	
Robert Morris	4	4	0	4	0	0	9	-9	
RPI	1	1	0	1	0	3	5	-2	
Rutgers	18	36	15	16	5	51	64	-13	
Sacramento State	2	4	2	2	0	6	8	-2	
Saint Joseph's	3	3	0	3	0	2	10	-8	
**Saint Louis**	**52**	120	74	40	6	265	164	101	
Saint Mary's	4	8	4	3	1	7	12	5	
San Diego	18	32	14	16	2	46	55	-9	
San Diego State	8	13	4	6	3	15	20	-5	1981 appearance was vacated
**San Francisco**	30	64	36	25	3	127	96	31	1978 (win) and 2008 appearances were vacated
San Jose State	14	21	6	14	1	37	53	-16	
**Santa Clara**	21	49	25	18	6	78	70	8	
Seattle	7	11	4	5	2	16	20	-4	
Seton Hall	14	23	6	14	3	28	38	-10	
Siena	1	1	0	0	1	1	1	0	
**SIU Edwardsville**	17	38	20	16	2	59	56	3	
SMU	37	78	40	29	9	123	114	9	
South Carolina	22	40	16	21	3	52	49	3	
South Florida	22	37	12	20	5	42	74	-32	
Southern Connecticut State	2	2	0	2	0	0	11	-11	
Springfield	2	3	1	2	0	2	7	-5	
**Stanford**	23	63	33	17	**13**	100	65	35	
Stetson	2	2	0	2	0	1	5	-4	
St. Francis	10	14	4	9	1	14	30	-16	
**St. John's**	23	51	28	22	1	71	62	9	
Stony Brook	3	4	1	2	1	2	4	-2	
St. Peter's	3	4	1	3	0	7	15	-8	
**Syracuse**	10	23	13	7	3	36	31	5	
Temple	7	11	4	6	1	23	26	-3	
Towson	2	4	2	2	0	7	6	1	
Trinity	4	7	3	4	0	13	19	-6	
Tulsa	13	25	11	12	2	35	44	-9	
UAB	8	12	4	6	2	19	21	-2	
UCF	10	16	6	10	0	19	30	-11	
**UCLA**	50	124	72	**43**	9	222	**169**	53	
**UConn**	37	79	40	28	11	137	106	31	
UC Davis	4	5	1	4	0	6	6	0	
UC Irvine	8	13	4	8	1	14	17	-3	
UC Riverside	2	2	0	2	0	1	3	-2	
**UC Santa Barbara**	15	37	22	12	3	66	42	24	
UIC	8	15	4	8	3	13	23	-10	
UMass	6	14	8	6	0	15	17	-2	
UMBC	5	11	3	2	6	9	8	-1	
UNC Greenboro	13	25	7	12	6	26	42	-16	
UNC Wilmington	4	7	2	3	2	7	8	-1	
UNLV	7	11	3	6	2	11	16	-5	
Utah Valley	1	1	0	1	0	0	2	-2	
VCU	9	12	2	8	2	17	28	-11	
**Vermont**	15	29	13	13	3	49	44	5	
Villanova	2	3	1	2	0	1	5	-4	
**Virginia**	45	112	66	33	13	188	114	74	
Virginia Tech	10	22	11	7	4	32	33	-1	
**Wake Forest**	28	67	39	23	5	109	81	28	
**Washington**	30	57	26	26	5	82	85	-3	
**West Chester State**	8	14	7	6	1	22	25	-3	
Western Illinois	6	6	0	6	0	2	14	-12	
Western Michigan	6	13	7	5	1	20	14	6	
West Virginia	18	32	13	17	2	48	59	-11	
William & Mary	16	26	7	15	4	30	33	-3	
Williams	1	1	0	1	0	0	1	-1	
Winthrop	6	7	0	5	2	4	21	-17	
Wisconsin	7	17	11	6	0	22	21	1	
Wofford	1	1	0	1	0	0	1	-1	
WPI	1	1	0	1	0	0	6	-6	
Wright State	1	2	1	0	1	3	2	1	Career unbeaten record
Xavier	5	8	3	5	0	10	16	-6	
Yale	8	14	6	7	1	16	22	-6	
