= 2016 MAAC men's soccer tournament =

- Classification: Division I
- Teams: 6
- Matches: 5
- Site: QU Soccer Stadium; Hamden, Connecticut
- Champions: Rider (4th title)
- MVP: Ryan Baird (Rider)
- Broadcast: MAAC.tv

2016 Metro Atlantic Athletic Conference men's soccer standings
| | Conf. | | | | | Overall |
| Team | W | | L | | T | W | | L | | T |
|---|---|---|---|---|---|---|---|---|---|---|
| Quinnipiac | 8 | – | 2 | – | 0 | 13 | – | 7 | – | 0 |
| Rider ‡ | 7 | – | 1 | – | 2 | 13 | – | 4 | – | 3 |
| Siena | 6 | – | 3 | – | 1 | 8 | – | 8 | – | 5 |
| Marist | 6 | – | 4 | – | 0 | 11 | – | 7 | – | 1 |
| Canisius | 4 | – | 3 | – | 3 | 9 | – | 8 | – | 3 |
| Monmouth | 5 | – | 5 | – | 0 | 6 | – | 9 | – | 2 |
| Iona | 4 | – | 6 | – | 0 | 5 | – | 13 | – | 0 |
| Fairfield | 3 | – | 6 | – | 1 | 5 | – | 9 | – | 3 |
| Niagara | 3 | – | 6 | – | 1 | 4 | – | 11 | – | 2 |
| Manhattan | 2 | – | 6 | – | 2 | 2 | – | 12 | – | 3 |
| Saint Peter's | 2 | – | 8 | – | 0 | 3 | – | 13 | – | 2 |
‡-Tournament Champion +- Invited to the NCAA Division I Men's Soccer Championship; As of 18 November 2016; Rankings from NSCAA

The 2016 MAAC men's soccer tournament was the 24th edition of the MAAC Men's Soccer Tournament. The tournament decided the Metro Atlantic Athletic Conference champion and guaranteed representative into the 2016 NCAA Division I Men's Soccer Championship.

The defending champions, Rider Broncs successfully defended their title, beating regular season champions, Quinnipiac, 3–1 in the championship game. The title was Rider's fourth overall MAAC championship. Additionally, Rider became the first school since Marist in 2004–2005 to repeat as MAAC Tournament champions.

Quinnipiac University hosted the semifinals and final of the tournament, while the first round was hosted by the higher seeds.

== Seeds ==
Seeds for the tournament are determined by teams' conference records, with tiebreakers determined according to MAAC tiebreaker rules.

| Seed | School | Conf | Tiebreaker |
|---|---|---|---|
| 1 | Quinnipiac^{†‡} | 8–2–0 | |
| 2 | Rider^{†} | 7–1–2 | |
| 3 | Siena | 6–3–1 | |
| 4 | Marist | 6–4–0 | |
| 5 | Canisius | 4–3–3 | |
| 6 | Monmouth | 5–5–0 | |
‡ – MAAC regular season champions, and tournament No. 1 seed. † – Received a first-round bye in the conference tournament.

== Bracket ==
First round Saturday, November 5
4 | Marist | 0
5 | Canisius | 2
3 | Siena (PK) | 0 (3)
6 | Monmouth | 0 (1)

Semifinal; Friday, November 11
1 | Quinnipiac | 3
5 | Canisius | 1
2 | Rider (PK) | 2 (3)
3 | Siena | 2 (1)

Final; Sunday, November 13
1 | Quinnipiac | 1
2 | Rider | 3

== Results ==
=== First round ===
| November 5 | ^{#3} Siena | 0–0 (a.e.t.) (3–1 p) | ^{#6} Monmouth | Loudonville, New York |
| 1:00 PM EDT | | Report; Box Score | | Stadium: Siena Turf Field; Attendance: 842; Referee: Mike Lee |
| | Penalties |
| | Sobot (penalty scored); Courto (penalty scored); Itoafa (penalty scored) | | (penalty scored) Klenofsky; (penalty missed) McCarthy; (penalty missed) Luke; (penalty missed) Nigro |

| November 5 | ^{#4} Marist | 0–2 | ^{#5} Canisius | Poughkeepsie, New York |
| 7:00 PM EDT | | Report; Box Score | Strauchen 3'; Santos 68' | Stadium: Leonidoff Field; Attendance: 973; Referee: Clovis DaSilva |

=== Semifinals ===
| November 11 | ^{#1} Quinnipiac | 3–1 | ^{#5} Canisius | Hamden, Connecticut |
| 10:00 AM EDT | Taylor 15'; Whelan 20'; Dally 58' | Report; Box Score | Teupen 53' | Stadium: QU Soccer Stadium; Attendance: 700; Referee: John Barr |

| November 11 | ^{#2} Rider | 2–2 (a.e.t.) (3–1 p) | ^{#5} Siena | Hamden, Connecticut |
| 1:00 PM EDT | Flath 39'; Bourret 76' | Report; Box Score | Herpreck 40' (o.g.); Tejera 51' (pen.) | Stadium: QU Soccer Stadium; Attendance: 700; Referee: Brian Dunn |
| | Penalties |
| | Aguinaga (penalty missed); Otmani (penalty missed); Huss (penalty scored); Pena (penalty scored); Flath (penalty scored) | | (penalty scored) Sobot; (penalty missed) Curto; (penalty missed) Itoafa; (penalty missed) McGlynn |

=== Final ===
| November 13 | ^{#1} Quinnipiac | 1–3 | ^{#2} Rider | Hamden, Connecticut |
| 1:00 PM EDT | McCoy 51' | Report; Box Score | Otmani 42'; Bourret 62'; Aguinaga 85' | Stadium: QU Soccer Stadium; Attendance: 1,147; Referee: Sam Saad |

== All-Tournament team ==
The MAAC All-Tournament team was announced following the championship. The MVP is in bold text.

| Goalkeepers | Defenders | Midfielders | Forwards |
|---|---|---|---|
| (Serbia) Aleska Radosavljević, Siena (United States) **Ryan Baird**, Rider | (Germany) Thomas Teupen, Canisius (Northern Ireland) Conor McCoy, Quinnipiac | (Jamaica) Melvin Blair, Canisius (Serbia) Uros Antić, Siena (Republic of Ireland) Matt Taylor, Quinnipiac (Spain) Adrien Huss, Rider | (United States) Rashawn Dally, Quinnipiac (France) Elliott Otmani, Rider (France) Clement Bourret, Rider |
