= 2020 MAAC men's soccer tournament =

- The 2020 Tournament logo to commemorate 40 years of MAAC soccer.
- Classification: Division I
- Teams: 4
- Semifinals site: Top seed
- Finals site: Top seed
- Broadcast: ESPN+

2020 Metro Atlantic Athletic Conference men's soccer standings
	Conf.					Overall
Team	W		L		T	W		L		T
Quinnipiac	5	–	1	–	0	7	–	2	–	0
Rider	2	–	0	–	1	3	–	1	–	1
Niagara	4	–	2	–	0	5	–	3	–	0
Saint Peter's	3	–	2	–	1	3	–	3	–	1
Fairfield	3	–	2	–	1	4	–	3	–	1
Monmouth ‡	2	–	2	–	1	6	–	3	–	1
Iona	2	–	3	–	1	2	–	4	–	1
Manhattan	2	–	4	–	0	2	–	4	–	0
Siena	2	–	4	–	1	2	–	6	–	1
Canisius	0	–	5	–	0	0	–	6	–	0
‡ – 2020 MAAC Tournament champion + – Also invited to the 2020 NCAA tournament; As of May 3, 2021; Rankings from United Soccer Coaches

The 2020 MAAC men's soccer tournament, will be the 28th edition of the MAAC Men's Soccer Tournament, a post-season college soccer conference tournament to determine the MAAC champion, and the conference's automatic berth into the NCAA Division I men's soccer tournament. The 2020 edition of the tournament was scheduled to begin on November 12 and conclude on November 15, 2020. In August 2020, the tournament was postponed from November 2020 to April 2021 due to the ongoing COVID-19 pandemic.

== Format changes ==
Previously, the MAAC Tournament had six teams with the higher seeds hosting the matches. The 2020 season will see the tournament reduced to four teams, with the regular season champion hosting all matches. This was in part done due to the ongoing COVID-19 pandemic. The MAAC indicated that the dates are to be flexible and subject to change if the tournament is to be played at an earlier or later date.

== Seeds ==
Seed	School	Conference	Tiebreaker
1			
2			
3			
4			

== Bracket ==
Semifinals; April 2021

Championship; April 2021

== Schedule ==
=== Semifinals ===
April 11, 2021

v

April 11, 2021

v

=== Championship ===
April 17, 2021

v

== Statistics ==
=== Goalscorers ===
To be determined

== All-Tournament team ==
Player	Team
2020 MAAC Men's Soccer All-Tournament team
