= 2012 MAAC men's soccer tournament =

Tournament details
- Country: United States
- Teams: 4

Final positions
- Champions: Niagara
- Runners-up: Loyola Maryland

Tournament statistics
- Matches played: 3
- Goals scored: 5 (1.67 per match)

The 2012 Metro Atlantic Athletic Conference men's soccer tournament was the conference's 24th edition of the tournament. The tournament began on November 8 and ended on November 10.

The Fairfield Stags were the defending champions. For the 2012 edition of the tournament, the field size was reduced from 10 participants to four. The winner was Niagara University.

== Bracket ==
Semifinals
1	Loyola Maryland	1
4	Iona	0
2	Siena	1
3	Niagara	2 (a.e.t.)

MAAC Championship
1	Loyola Maryland	0
3	Niagara	1

== Schedule ==
=== Semifinals ===
November 8, 2012	Niagara	2–1 (a.e.t.)	Siena	Poughkeepsie, NY
7:00 PM EST	Andersson 78'; Cooper 91'	Report	Allen (yellow card) 57'; Hemsley 79'	Stadium: Tenney Stadium; Referee: Guido Gonzalez

November 8, 2012	Iona	0–1	Loyola Maryland	Poughkeepsie, NY
9:00 PM EST	Otto (yellow card) 51'	Report	Thompson 78'	Stadium: Tenney Stadium; Referee: JC Rivero

=== MAAC Championship ===
November 10, 2012	Niagara	1–0 (a.e.t.)	Loyola Maryland	Poughkeepsie, NY
20:00 ET	da Cruz 102'	Report		Stadium: Tenney Stadium

== See also ==
- Metro Atlantic Athletic Conference
- 2012 in American soccer
- 2012 NCAA Division I men's soccer season
- 2012 NCAA Division I Men's Soccer Championship
