= Isabella Fernández =

Dominican footballer

Personal information
- Full name: Isabella Fernández de Cueto
- Date of birth: 2003 (age 21–22)
- Place of birth: United States
- Position(s): Midfielder

Team information
- Current team: Saint Peter's Peacocks
- Number: 20

Youth career
- 2017–2022: American Heritage Patriots
- Sunrise Prime

College career
Years	Team	Apps	(Gls)
2022–	Saint Peter's Peacocks	4	(0)

International career^{‡}
2021–	Dominican Republic	1	(0)
- ‡ National team caps and goals as of 21 February 2021.

Isabella Fernández de Cueto (born 2003), known as Isabella Fernández, is an American-born Dominican footballer who plays as a midfielder for Saint Peter's Peacocks and the Dominican Republic women's national team.

== High school career ==
Fernández has attended the American Heritage School in Plantation, Florida.

== International career ==
Fernández made her senior debut for the Dominican Republic on 21 February 2021 as an 87th-minute substitution during a 0–2 friendly home loss to Puerto Rico.
