= Monmouth Hawks men's soccer =

American college soccer team

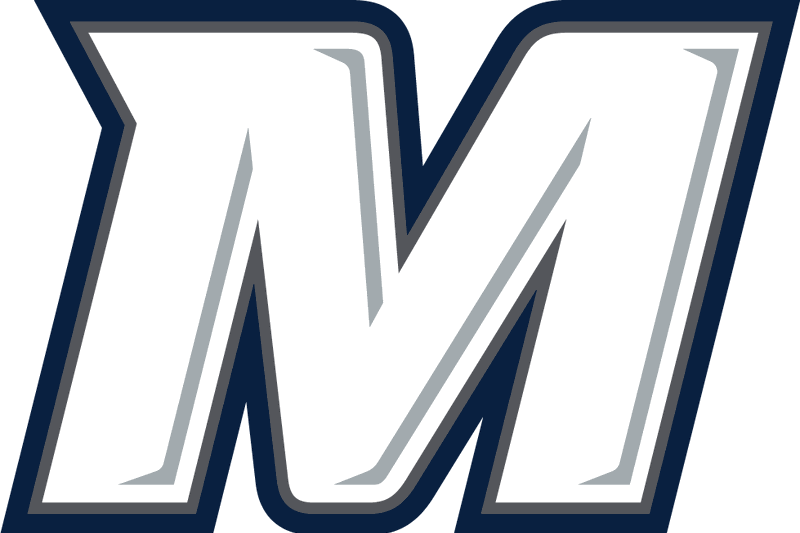
- Founded: 1982; 44 years ago
- University: Monmouth University
- Head coach: Robert McCourt (14th season)
- Conference: CAA
- Location: West Long Branch, New Jersey, US
- Stadium: Hesse Field (capacity: 1,000)
- Nickname: Hawks
- Colors: Midnight blue and white
| Home | Away |

NCAA tournament appearances
- 1990, 2006, 2009, 2010, 2011, 2014, 2020

Conference tournament championships
- 2006, 2009, 2010, 2011, 2014, 2020

Conference regular season championships
- 1990, 1993, 2005, 2006, 2007, 2008, 2009, 2010, 2011, 2013, 2015, 2023

The Monmouth Hawks men's soccer team is a varsity intercollegiate athletic team of Monmouth University in West Long Branch, New Jersey, United States. The team is a member of the Colonial Athletic Association, which is part of the National Collegiate Athletic Association's Division I. Monmouth's first men's soccer team was fielded in 1982. The team plays its home games at Hesse Field in West Long Branch, New Jersey. The Hawks are coached by Robert McCourt.

== Seasons ==
| Season | Coach | Overall | Conference | Standing | Postseason |
|---|---|---|---|---|---|
Independent (1982–1984)
| 1982 | Joe Donahue | 5–7–3 | | | |
| 1983 | Joe Donahue | 7–9–0 | | | |
| 1984 | Joe Donahue | 6–12–1 | | | |
| Independent Total: | | 18–28–4 | | | |
Northeast Conference (1985–2012)
| 1985 | Joe Donahue | 13–9–0 | 2–4–0 | 5th | |
| 1986 | Joe Donahue | 7–13–1 | 2–4–0 | 5th | |
| 1987 | Joe Donahue | 7–13–0 | 1–5–0 | 7th | |
| 1988 | Joe Donahue | 12–5–2 | 3–1–1 | 2nd | NEC Semifinals |
| 1989 | Wayne Ramsey | 7–11–1 | 4–3–0 | 4th | NEC Semifinals |
| 1990 | Wayne Ramsey | 11–7–1 | 6–1–0 | 1st | NEC Champions; NCAA Play-In |
| 1991 | Wayne Ramsey | 9–10–2 | 5–2–0 | 2nd | NEC Runners-up |
| 1992 | Wayne Ramsey | 6–12–0 | 2–6–0 | 7th | |
| 1993 | Wayne Ramsey | 11–9–0 | 6–2–0 | 1st | NEC Semifinals |
| 1994 | Wayne Ramsey | 4–13–0 | 3–5–0 | 5th | |
| 1995 | Wayne Ramsey | 7–11–1 | 4–4–0 | 4th | NEC Runners-up |
| 1996 | Wayne Ramsey | 7–9–1 | 4–4–0 | 6th | |
| 1997 | Wayne Ramsey | 10–7–1 | 3–2–1 | 3rd | NEC Semifinals |
| 1998 | Shannon Poser | 7–12–1 | 4–4–1 | 6th | |
| 1999 | Shannon Poser | 6–8–4 | 4–3–3 | 4th | NEC Semifinals |
| 2000 | Shannon Poser | 5–10–3 | 2–6–2 | 9th | |
| 2001 | Shannon Poser | 4–13–1 | 2–7–1 | 10th | |
| 2002 | Shannon Poser | 7–11–0 | 5–5–0 | 5th | |
| 2003 | Shannon Poser | 4–11–1 | 3–6–0 | 7th | |
| 2004 | Robert McCourt | 7–8–3 | 2–4–3 | 8th | |
| 2005 | Robert McCourt | 10–4–6 | 6–0–3 | 1st | NEC Runners-up |
| 2006 | Robert McCourt | 14–4–3 | 7–0–2 | 1st | NEC Champions; NCAA First Round |
| 2007 | Robert McCourt | 12–5–2 | 7–2–0 | 1st | NEC Semifinals |
| 2008 | Robert McCourt | 12–3–4 | 6–1–2 | 1st | NEC Semifinals |
| 2009 | Robert McCourt | 18–2–2 | 8–1–1 | 1st | NEC Champions; NCAA Second Round |
| 2010 | Robert McCourt | 14–2–4 | 6–0–4 | 2nd | NEC Champions; NCAA First Round |
| 2011 | Robert McCourt | 14–5–2 | 7–3–0 | 1st | NEC Champions; NCAA Second Round |
| 2012 | Robert McCourt | 11–4–4 | 6–2–2 | 3rd | NEC Semifinals |
| NEC Total: | | 256–231–50 | 120–87–26 | | |
Metro Atlantic Athletic Conference (2013–2021)
| 2013 | Robert McCourt | 8–6–6 | 7–1–2 | 1st | MAAC Runners-up |
| 2014 | Robert McCourt | 11–4–6 | 4–1–5 | 4th | MAAC Champions; NCAA First Round |
| 2015 | Robert McCourt | 13–4–4 | 7–0–3 | 1st | MAAC Runners-up |
| 2016 | Robert McCourt | 6–9–3 | 5–5–0 | 6th | MAAC Quarterfinals |
| 2017 | Robert McCourt | 7–9–2 | 4–5–1 | 7th | |
| 2018 | Robert McCourt | 2–14–1 | 0–10–0 | 11th | |
| 2019 | Robert McCourt | 3–12–2 | 3–6–1 | 9th | |
| 2020 | Robert McCourt | 6–3–1 | 2–2–1 | 6th | MAAC Champions; NCAA Second Round |
| 2021 | Robert McCourt | 8–9–2 | 5–5–0 | 7th | MAAC Semifinals |
| MAAC Total: | | 64–70–27 | 37–35–13 | | |
Coastal Athletic Association (2022–present)
| 2022 | Robert McCourt | 7–7–1 | 2–6–1 | 9th | |
| 2023 | Robert McCourt | 8–4–6 | 5–1–2 | 1st | CAA Runners-up |
| 2024 | Robert McCourt | 8–2–6 | 4–1–3 | 3rd | CAA Quarterfinals |
| CAA Total: | | 23–13–13 | 11–8–6 | | |
| Total: | | 361–342–94 | | | |
National champion Postseason invitational champion Conference regular season champion Conference regular season and conference tournament champion Division regular season champion Division regular season and conference tournament champion Conference tournament champion

== Postseason ==
=== NCAA tournament results ===
Monmouth has appeared in seven NCAA Tournaments. Their best performance was reaching the second round in 2009, 2011, and in 2020. Their most recent appearance was in 2020.

| Year | Record | Seed | Region | Round | Opponent | Results |
|---|---|---|---|---|---|---|
| 2006 | 14–4–3 | —N/a | 2 | First round | at St. John's | L 0–1 |
| 2009 | 18–1–1 | —N/a | 4 | First round Second round | Connecticut at #10 Harvard | T 0–0 (W 4–3 pen.); L 0–3 |
| 2010 | 14–1–4 | —N/a | 1 | First round | Dartmouth | L 0–4 |
| 2011 | 14–6–2 | —N/a | 3 | First round Second round | Stony Brook at #3 Connecticut | T 0–0 (W 5–4 pen.); L 1–2 |
| 2014 | 11–4–6 | —N/a | 2 | First round | at Xavier | L 1–2 (OT) |
| 2020 | 5–2–1 | —N/a | —N/a | First round Second round | vs Bowling Green vs #2 Pittsburgh | W 2–1; L 1–6 |

== Individual achievements ==
=== All-Americans ===
Monmouth has produced four All-Americans. The most recent All-American came in 2011.

| Player | Position | Year |
|---|---|---|
| Steven Holloway | MF | 2006 |
| Dan Bostock | FW | 2009 |
| Ryan Kinne | FW | 2009, 2010 |
| R. J. Allen | DF | 2010, 2011 |

=== Individual records ===
==== Career records ====
Points
| Pos. | Player | Career | Pts. |
|---|---|---|---|
| 1 | Mark Wilson | 1985–88 | 101 |
| 2 | Ryan Kinne | 2007–10 | 97 |
| 3 | Joni Kallioinen | 1989–91 | 94 |
| 4 | Steven Holloway | 2003–06 | 76 |
| 5 | Kyle LeBaron | 1995–98 | 72 |

Goals
| Pos. | Player | Career | G |
|---|---|---|---|
| 1 | Mark Wilson | 1985–88 | 40 |
| 2 | Joni Kallioinen | 1989–91 | 38 |
| 3 | Ryan Kinne | 2007–10 | 35 |
| 4 | Steven Holloway | 2003–06 | 30 |
| 5 | Kyle LeBaron | 1995–98 | 28 |

Assists
| Pos. | Player | Career | A |
|---|---|---|---|
| 1 | Markku Salminen | 1987–89 | 37 |
| 2 | Ryan Clark | 2009–12 | 25 |
| 3 | Tom Gray | 2005–07 | 25 |
| 4 | R. J. Allen | 2008–11 | 23 |
| 5 | Ryan Kinne | 2007–10 | 21 |

Goals Against Average
| Pos. | Player | Career | GAA |
|---|---|---|---|
| 1 | Bryan Meredith | 2007–10 | 0.51 |
| 2 | Daniel Schenkel | 2006–07 | 0.56 |
| 3 | Eric Klenofsky | 2013–16 | 0.62 |
| 4 | Alex Blackburn | 2009–12 | 0.66 |
| 5 | Art Satterwhite | 2002–05 | 1.32 |

Save Percentage
| Pos. | Player | Career | Per. |
|---|---|---|---|
| 1 | Mark Wilson | 1985–88 | .856 |
| 2 | Bryan Meredith | 1989–91 | .842 |
| 3 | Eric Klenofsky | 2007–10 | .842 |
| 4 | Alex Blackburn | 2009–12 | .822 |
| 5 | Jim Adams | 1990–91 | .819 |

Appearances
| Pos. | Player | Career | App. |
|---|---|---|---|
| 1 | Dave Pelland | 1987–89 | 82 |
| 2 | R. J. Allen | 2008–11 | 82 |
| 3 | Derek Luke | 2011–15 | 82 |
| 4 | Ryan Clark | 2009–12 | 80 |
| 5 | Max Hamilton | 2008–11 | 80 |
