= Mazzella Field =

Stadium in New Rochelle, New York

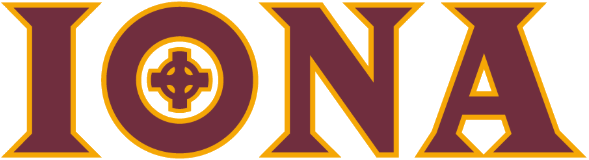

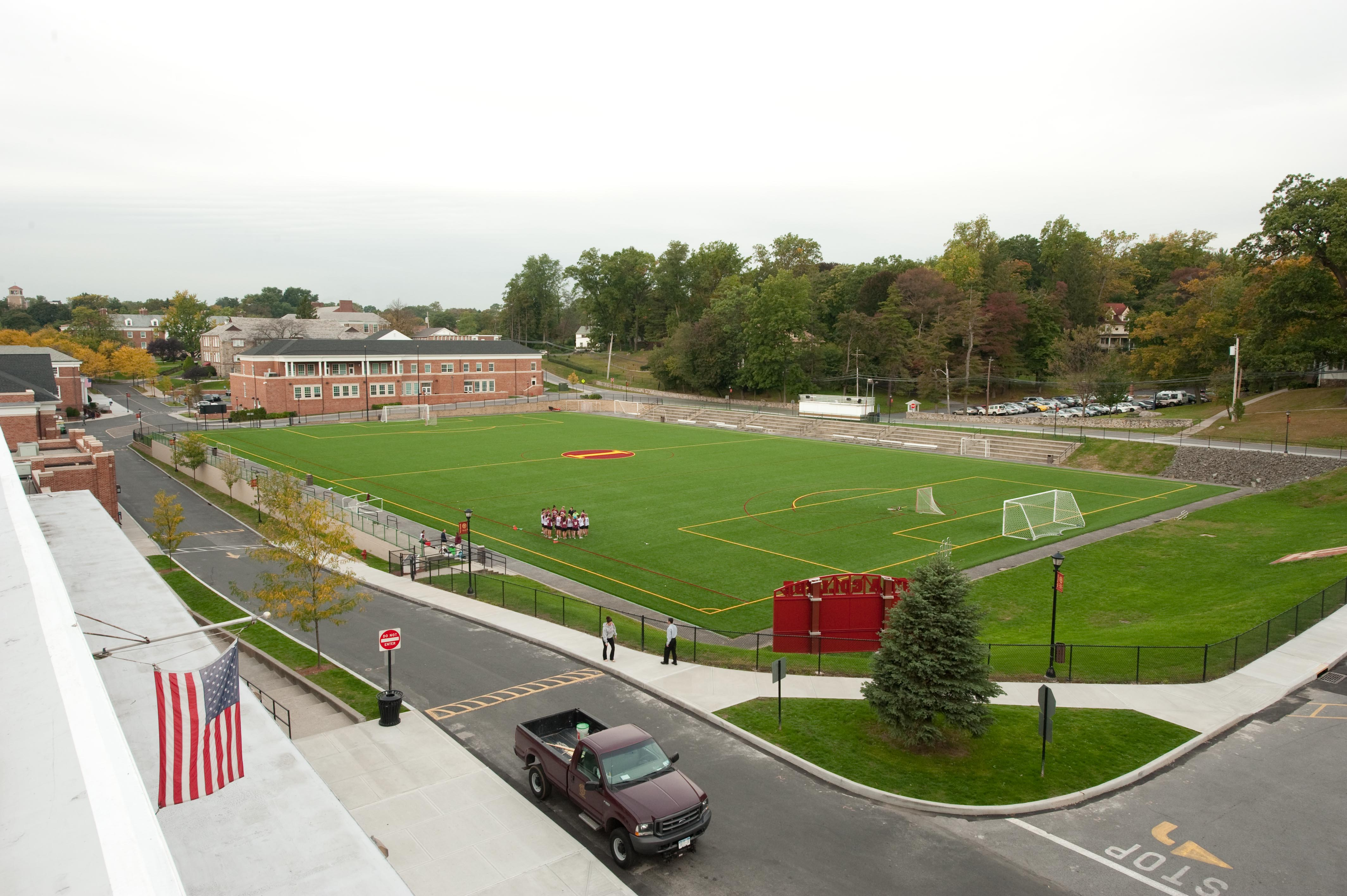
- View of the stadium in 2009
- Interactive map of Mazzella Field
- Address: 715 North Ave. New Rochelle, NY; United States
- Coordinates: 40°55′37″N 73°47′8″W
- Owner: Iona College
- Operator: Iona College Athletics
- Capacity: 2,400
- Type: Stadium
- Surface: FieldTurf
- Current use: Soccer; Lacrosse; Rugby union

Construction
- Opened: 1989; 37 years ago

Tenants
- Iona Gaels (NCAA) (1989–present); New York Magic (UWS) (1997–present)

Website
- ionagaels.com/mazzella-field

Mazzella Field is a 2,400 seat soccer-specific stadium on the campus of Iona College in New Rochelle, New York. It is home to the Iona Gaels soccer, lacrosse, and rugby union teams, as well as the women's New York Magic of United Women's Soccer.

First opened in 1989, it was originally used as a multi-purpose stadium that also hosted the school's college football team until the program was disbanded in 2008.

The field was the site of the 2008 Empire State Games men's lacrosse championships.

In June 2017, Mazzella Field received a new FieldTurf surface striped for soccer and lacrosse.

== Rugby ==
Date	Home	Score	Away
March 17, 2018	Rugby United New York	36–19	Ontario Arrows
December 15, 2018	Rugby United New York	100–0	Capital Selects
