= Rider Broncs men's soccer =

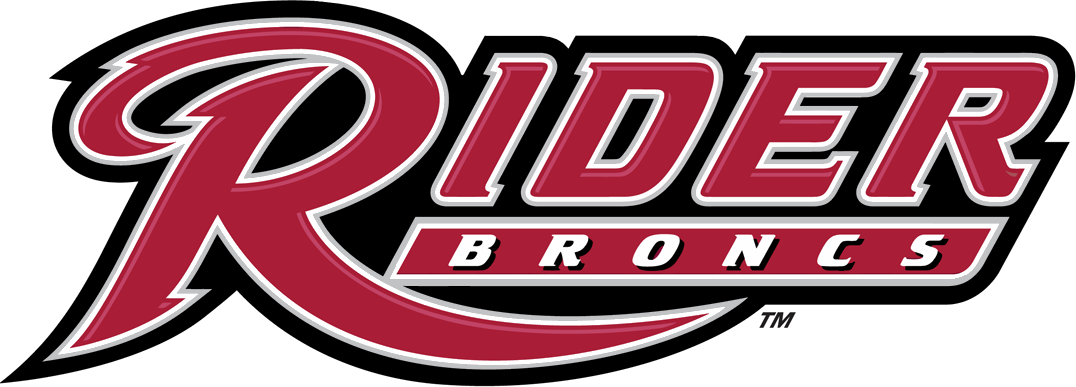
- Founded: 1933; 93 years ago
- University: Rider University
- Head coach: Dennis Bohn (3rd. season)
- Conference: MAAC; I Division
- Location: Lawrenceville, New Jersey, US
- Stadium: Ben Cohen Field (capacity: n/a)
- Nickname: Broncs
- Colors: Cranberry, white, and gray
Home	Away

NCAA tournament appearances
- 1997, 1998, 2015, 2016, 2018, 2023

Conference tournament championships
- 1997, 1998, 2015, 2016, 2018, 2023

Conference regular season championships
- 2002

The Rider Broncs men's soccer is the intercollegiate varsity soccer team representing the Rider University, located in Lawrenceville, New Jersey. The team is a member of the Metro Atlantic Athletic Conference athletic conference of NCAA Division I.

The Broncs' current head coach Chad Duernberger, who is in charge since 2023. The team play their home matches at Ben Cohen Field, inaugurated in 2010.

Established in 1933, the Rider soccer program has won six MAAC tournaments, the last in 2023.

== Stadium ==
The Broncs play their home matches at Ben Cohen Field, opened in 2010. The venue has an artificial grass surface by FieldTurf since 2020. The first match played under this surface was in September 2020 with a women's soccer game against Fairleigh Dickinson. It was also the first match played at night in the history of Rider’s Lawrenceville campus.

The stadium was named after Benjamin Cohen '10, Rider's alumni and son of David and Rhonda Cohen, donators to the stadium's surface improvements.

The stadium is also the home venue to the Rider women's soccer and field hockey teams.

== Players ==
=== Current roster ===
As of December 2025

Note: Flags indicate national team as defined under FIFA eligibility rules; some limited exceptions apply. Players may hold more than one non-FIFA nationality.

No.	Pos.	Nation	Player
1	GK	NZL	Ben Collins
2	DF	USA	Ryan Vaubel
3	DF	USA	Max Schrader
4	DF	USA	Bobby Lucien
5	DF	GER	Bobby Lucien
7	MF	SVN	Lovro Kostanjsek
8	MF	NED	Ezra Punselie
11	MF	USA	Drew Heil
12	MF	BRA	Theo Da Silva
13	MF	USA	William Baker
14	DF	USA	Sebastian Suber
15	FW	USA	Ethan Gregory
16	FW	USA	Xavi Csato

No.	Pos.	Nation	Player
17	FW	USA	Patryk Rojek
18	FW	POL	Oli Karbownik
19	MF	USA	Daniel Gonzalez
20	MF	USA	Landon Lackner
21	DF	TCA	Ricky Joasilus
22	FW	USA	Gio Polizzi
24	DF	AUS	Kaelan Debbage
25	MF	USA	Luke Kirilenko
26	MF	USA	Brandon Carro
27	DF	BER	Daniel Cook
30	MF	USA	Colton Beuck
32	GK	FRA	Marius Helias
42	GK	ISR	Yoav Arikha

=== Records ===
key

- – member of the Rider Athletics Hall of Fame
- – member of the Rider Athletics Hall of Fame and inducted to the National Soccer Hall of Fame

Top scorers

#	Nat.	Player	Goals	Tenure
1	(United States)	Craig Wicken	49	1995–98
2	(United States)	Bobby Smith	46	1969–72
3	(United States)	Matt Miles	46	1993–96
4	(United States)	Tom Wieboldt	39	1974–77
5	(United States)	Dennis Ducko	33	1955–59

Assistances

#	Nat.	Player	Goals	Tenure
1	(Spain)	José Aguinaga	32	2014–17
2	(United States)	Todd Moore	26	1994–97
3		Craig Wicken	24	1995–98
3	(United States)	Mike Stasiulaitis	24	1989–91
3		Len Matysek	24	1958–60
4	(France)	Elliott Otmani	22	2015–18
5	(Germany)	Christian Flath	21	2013–16

=== Players in the pros ===
Rider players that play/have played at professional levels are:

Nat.	Player	Pos.	Pro	Professional career (teams)	Ref.
(United States)	Bobby Smith	DF	1973	Philadelphia Atoms, NY Cosmos, San Diego Sockers, Philadelphia Fury	
(France)	Florian Valot	MF	2016	New York Red Bulls II, FC Cincinnati, Miami FC	
(Spain)	José Aguinaga	FW	2018	New York Red Bulls II, Phoenix Rising	

== Coaches ==
=== Current staff ===
As of 21 December 2025

Position	Name
Head coach	Chad Duernberger
Assist. coach	Drew Munoz
Assist. coach	Gus Valeriano
Assist. coach	Reilly Fuller

=== Coaching history ===
As of December 2025

#	Name	Record	Seas.	Tenure
1	Frank Donlon	n/a	18	1933–1939, 1947–60
2	Joe Ritter	44–42–4	7	1962–68
3	Bob Pivovarnick	37–40–10	6	1969–74
4	Russ Fager	249–342–60	36	1975–2010
5	Charlie Inverso	96–91–25	12	2011–22
6	Chad Duernberger	12–4–4	3	2023–present

== Team statistics ==
Statistic	Number	Year	Additional info
Most wins (in a season)	15	1997	15–6–1 (season record)
Most goals scored (in a game)	14	1960	vs Wilkes
Most goals scored (in a season)	61	1992	10–7–2 (season record)
Fewest goals allowed (in a season)	14	1968	10–3–1 (season record)

== Titles ==
=== Conference ===
Conference	Championship	Titles	Winning years
Metro Atlantic	Tournament	6	1997, 1998, 2015, 2016, 2018, 2023
Northeast	Tournament	1	1992
Northeast	Regular season	1	2002

=== NCAA appearances ===
Rider's appearances in NCAA tournament are listed below:

Key

- a.e.t. – Match went to extra time
- p – Match decided by a penalty shootout after extra time

Season	Stage	Rival	Res.	Score
1997	First round	SMU	L	0–1
1998	First round	Virginia	L	0–3
2015	First round	Virginia	L	0–2
2016	First round	Vermont	L	1–4
2018	First round	Akron	L	1–3
2023	First round	Vermont	L	1–3
