= Marist Red Foxes men's soccer =

American college soccer team

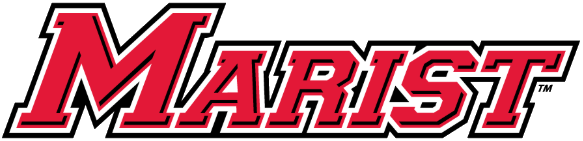
- Founded: 1981; 45 years ago
- University: Marist University
- Head coach: Matt Viggiano
- Conference: MAAC
- Location: Poughkeepsie, New York, U.S.
- Stadium: Tenney Stadium at Leonidoff Field (capacity: 5,000)
- Nickname: Red Foxes
- Colors: Red and white
Home	Away

NCAA tournament appearances
- 2000, 2004, 2005, 2021

Conference tournament championships
- 2000, 2004, 2005, 2021

The Marist Red Foxes men's soccer team represents Marist University and competes in the Metro Atlantic Athletic Conference (MAAC) of NCAA Division I.

== History ==
In the fall of 1981, Marist College added Men's Soccer to its athletic program, joining the existing Marist teams already competing at the Division 1 level. The team achieved immediate success in its first season with a 12-6-1 record.

The program has had a number of standout seasons, including its first-ever MAAC Championship and NCAA tournament berth in 2000, back-to-back MAAC Championships in 2004–2005 and another in 2021.

== Titles ==
=== Conference ===
- MACC tournament (4): 2000, 2004, 2005, 2021
