= Iona Gaels men's soccer =

American college soccer team

Iona Gaels Men's Soccer
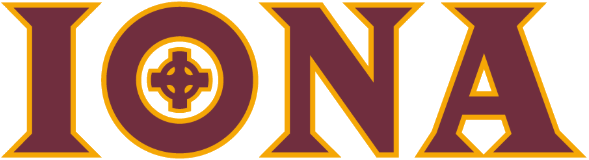
- Founded: 1970; 56 years ago
- University: Iona College (New York)
- Head coach: James Hamilton (3rd season)
- Conference: MAAC
- Location: New Rochelle, New York
- Stadium: Mazzella Field (capacity: 2,400)
- Nickname: Gaels
- Colors: Maroon and gold
Home	Away

NCAA tournament appearances
- 2019, 2024

Conference tournament championships
- 2019, 2024

Conference regular season championships
- 2023

The Iona Gaels Men's Soccer Team is a varsity intercollegiate athletic team of Iona College in New Rochelle, New York, United States. The team is a member of the Metro Atlantic Athletic Conference, which is part of the National Collegiate Athletic Association's Division I. The team plays its home games at Mazzella Field in New Rochelle.

== NCAA tournament appearance ==
- 2019

== Notable alumni ==
- Ignacio Maganto
- Jordan Scarlett
- Killian Colombie
- Víctor Muñoz

== Titles ==
=== Conference ===
- MACC tournament (2): 2019, 2024
- MACC regular season (1): 2023
