= Manhattan Jaspers men's soccer =

American college soccer team

- 2022 Manhattan Jaspers men's soccer team
- Founded: 1967
- University: Manhattan University
- Head coach: Jorden Scott (7th season)
- Conference: MAAC; I Division
- Location: The Bronx, New York, US
- Stadium: Gaelic Park (capacity: 2,000)
- Nickname: Jaspers
- Colors: Green and white
Home	Away

The Manhattan Jaspers men's soccer program represents Manhattan College in all NCAA Division I men's college soccer competitions. Founded in 1967, the Jaspers compete in the Metro Atlantic Athletic Conference. The Jaspers are coached by Jorden Scott, who has coached the program since 2017. The Jaspers play their home matches at Gaelic Park, near the Manhattan campus.

== Individual honors ==
=== Conference honors ===
Year	Player	Honor	Ref.
2003	Walter Kotchin	MAAC Rookie of the Year	
2013	Jorden Scott	MAAC Coach of the Year	

=== Team honors ===
- Career Goals Leader: Robert Schimpf, 41 (1969–71)
- Career Assists Leader: Bo Kucyna, 34 (1977–80)
- Career Saves Leader: Tom Umstatter, 377 (1974–75)
- Career Shutouts Leader: Andy Hlushko, 12 (1980–82)
