= Siena Saints men's soccer =

American college soccer team

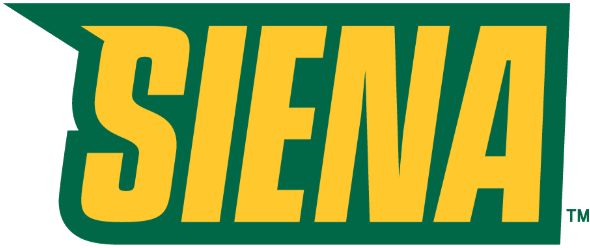
- Founded: 1942; 84 years ago
- University: Siena University (New York)
- Head coach: Graciano Brito
- Location: Loudonville, New York
- Stadium: Hickey Field
- Nickname: Saints
- Colors: Green and gold
| Home | Away |

NCAA Tournament appearances
- 2025

Conference Tournament championships
- 2025

The Siena Saints men's soccer team represents Siena University in Loudonville, New York in NCAA Division I college soccer. Siena men's soccer competes in the Metro Atlantic Athletic Conference (MAAC). The Saints are coached by Graciano Brito. Siena plays its home games at Hickey Field in Loudonville, New York.

== History ==
The Siena soccer program played its first season in 1942, converting to varsity in 1974, joining NCAA Division I in 1976, and joined the Metro Atlantic Athletic Conference (MAAC) in 1989. The Saints have remained a MAAC member since 1989.

Since joined the MAAC in 1989.

The program's record for most wins in a season was set in 1998, when the Saints went 11–6–1. The 1998 season ended with a 5–4 MAAC record that was 5th place in the conference, not qualifying for the conference tournament. The 1998 team also holds the program record for highest winning percentage at .639.

Siena has also never been conference regular season champions, finishing second place in conference in 1989 (T-2nd MAAC North), 1993, 1994, 2008, 2010, 2012, 2023 and 2025. The Saints win their first ever MAAC tournament in 2025, thus making their first appearance in the NCAA tournament held that same year.
