= Quinnipiac Bobcats men's soccer =

American college soccer team

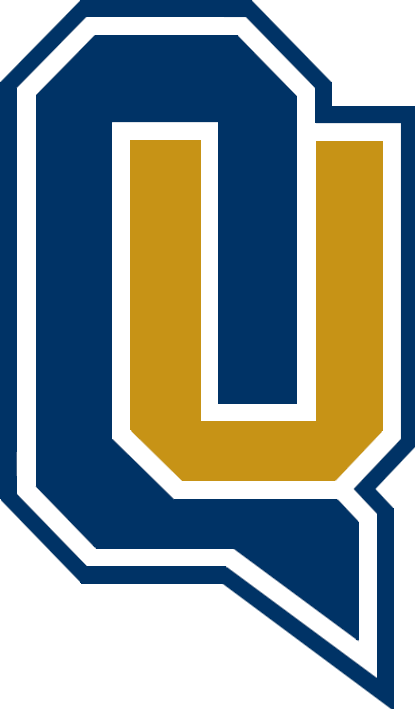
- Founded: 1962; 64 years ago
- University: Quinnipiac University
- Head coach: Eric Da Costa (22nd season)
- Conference: The Metro
- Location: Hamden, Connecticut, US
- Stadium: Quinnipiac Soccer Stadium (capacity: 1,500)
- Nickname: Bobcats
- Colors: Navy and gold
Home	Away

NCAA tournament appearances
- 2013, 2022

Conference tournament championships
- 2013, 2022

The Quinnipiac Bobcats men's soccer program represents the Quinnipiac University in all NCAA Division I men's college soccer competitions. Founded in 1962, the Bobcats compete in the Metro Atlantic Athletic Conference. The Bobcats are coached by Eric Da Costa, who has coached the program since 2005. The Bobcats plays their home matches at Quinnipiac Soccer Stadium, on the QU campus.

== NCAA tournament results ==
- 2013: L 1-2 vs. UConn
- 2022: L 2-3 2OT vs. Vermont
