= Saint Peter's Peacocks =

Intercollegiate athletics program of Saint Peter's University

- University: Saint Peter's University
- NCAA: Division I
- Conference: MAAC
- Athletic director: Katie Arcuri
- Location: Jersey City, New Jersey
- Varsity teams: 16
- Basketball arena: Run Baby Run Arena
- Baseball stadium: Joseph J. Jaroschak Field
- Soccer stadium: Joseph J. Jaroschak Field
- Nickname: Peacocks
- Colors: Blue and white
- Mascot: Peter the Peacock
- Fight song: "Io Pavo"
- Website: saintpeterspeacocks.com

The Saint Peter's Peacocks are the sixteen intercollegiate athletic teams that represent Saint Peter's University, located in Jersey City, New Jersey. The Peacocks compete in the NCAA Division I and are founding members of the Metro Atlantic Athletic Conference (MAAC). They previously competed in the Metropolitan Collegiate Conference (MCC) from 1965 to 1969.

== Nickname and mascot history ==
From 1918 to 1930, the then College, closed due to the impact of World War I and because Jesuit superiors wanted to concentrate their manpower in other colleges on the East Coast. As noted in the college yearbook, “The classrooms went empty. The faculty closed their markbooks, and left for the battlefields.”

In 1930, with Rev. Robert I. Gannon, S.J., as Dean, Saint Peter's re-opened on the fourth floor of the Chamber of Commerce Building in Downtown Jersey City, and women were admitted to the Evening Session for the first time.

With the rebirth of Saint Peter's in 1930, Rev. Gannon named the Peacock the official mascot of the college, reflecting the spirit of “resurrection and eternal life.” The peacock also ties Saint Peter's to the settling of Jersey City, originally called “Pavonia,” or “Land of the Peacock”.

The Saint Peter's University mascot is Peter the Peacock. The updated mascot was introduced on April 20, 2016, on the first annual Peacock Pride Day to celebrate the legacy and birthday of the late Dean, Rev. Gannon, S.J. and “Founding Father” of the peacock being chosen as a symbol of Saint Peter's.

== Teams ==
A member of the Metro Atlantic Athletic Conference (MAAC), Saint Peter's sponsors teams in eight men's and eight women's NCAA sanctioned sports. Women's golf will become the Peacocks' 17th varsity sport in 2026–27.

Men's sports	Women's sports
Baseball	Basketball
Basketball	Cross country
Cross country	Golf (2026–27)
Golf	Soccer
Soccer	Softball
Swimming & diving	Swimming & diving
Track & field^{1}	Track & field^{1}
	Volleyball
^{1} – includes both indoor and outdoor

== Discontinued teams ==
=== Football ===
The Peacocks football program ran from 1971 to 2006.

=== Tennis ===
The Peacocks men's and women's tennis teams were discontinued in 2018.

=== Women's bowling ===
The Peacocks women's bowling team was discontinued following the 2017–18 season.

== Facilities ==
The Peacocks play at two main athletic facilities. Joseph J. Jaroschak Field in nearby Lincoln Park, is home to the baseball, softball, and men's and women's soccer teams. The Victor R. Yanitelli, S.J. Recreational Life Center is located on campus and is home to the swimming and diving teams with the volleyball and men's and women's basketball teams playing their home games in Run Baby Run Arena. The Yanitelli Center is also home to a number of club and intramural teams.

Prior to the opening of the Yanitelli Center on campus in 1975, Saint Peter's used the nearby Jersey City Armory as the home arena for its men's and women's basketball teams.
