= Niagara Purple Eagles men's soccer =

- Founded: 1969; 57 years ago
- University: Niagara University
- Head coach: Bill Boyle (9th season)
- Conference: MAAC
- Location: Lewiston, New York, US
- Stadium: Niagara Field (capacity: 1,200)
- Nickname: Purple Eagles
- Colors: Purple and white
Home	Away

NCAA tournament appearances
- 2012

Conference tournament championships
- 2012

The Niagara Purple Eagles men's soccer team is the men's college soccer team that represent Niagara University (Lewiston, New York, United States) and competes in the Metro Atlantic Athletic Conference (MAAC) of NCAA Division I. The Purple Eagles play their home games at Niagara Field on the campus of Niagara University. The team colors are purple PMS 268 and white.

== History ==
The team played their first season in 1969, and joined the Metro Atlantic Athletic Conference (MAAC) in 1989.

In the 2012 season, the team won its first MAAC tournament title and the program's first NCAA play-in berth, losing against Michigan on the first round (1–3).

== Roster ==
Number	Name	Position	Height	Year	Previous School	Hometown
0	David Indra	GK	6'1"	Junior	Monroe Community College	Frauenfeld, Switzerland
00	Mikkel Thorsen	GK	6'2"	Senior	Clarence	Sjaelland, Denmark
1	Jaime Barry	GK	6'3"	Sophomore	St. Pauls College	Dublin, Ireland (Republic of Ireland)
3	Landon Hungerford	M	6'0"	Junior	Dewitt	Dewitt, Michigan (United States)
4	Giovanni Covelli	M	5'11"	Junior	Western Michigan	Woodhaven, Michigan (United States)
6	Luca Buscaglia	D	5'9"	Freshman	Williamsville East	East Amherst, NY (United States)
7	Lucas Fenton	M	5'10"	Junior	Genesse Community College	Kinross, Scotland
8	Cameron Roach	M	5'6"	Junior	St. Theresa	Marysville, Canada
9	Asher Barnes	F	6'0"	Junior	Northview Heights	Toronto, Canada
10	Matheus Spina	M	5'7"	Junior	Genesse Community College	Sorocaba, Brazil
11	Gianluca Del Priore	M	5'9"	Freshman	St. Francis	St. Catharines, Canada
12	Robert Woods	F	5'8"	Sophomore	Lewiston Porter	Lewiston, New York (United States)
13	Piercarlo Arghittu	F	5'7"	Freshman	Saint-Jean-de-Brebeuf	Thorold, Canada
14	Mick Bastiaenen	D	6'4"	Junior	Monroe Community College	Haarlem, Netherlands
15	Anthony Amato	D	5'8"	Sophomore	Grand Island	Grand Island, New York (United States)
16	Gabriel Mikina	M	6'2"	Junior	Father John Redmond Catholic	Toronto, Canada
17	Thomas Brooks	M	6'2"	Freshman	Saint Paul Catholic	Niagara Falls, Canada
20	Dominic Cintra	F	6'1"	Freshman	Forest Hill Collegiate Institute	Toronto, Canada
22	Gerard Lopez Forner	F	6'0"	Graduate	Presbyterian	Silla, Spain
23	Kevin Payne	D	6'4"	Junior	Jackson	Jackson, Michigan (United States)
24	Alberto Sanchez Cervera	D	6'1"	Sophomore	Levante UD	Valencia, Spain
25	Brady McNulty	D	6'1"	Junior	Temple City	San Gabriel, California (United States)
27	Alex Martin	M	5'10"	Freshman	Palisades Charter	Los Angeles, California (United States)
28	Juan Cardona	M	6'2"	Sophomore	Davis & Elkins	Cali, Colombia
33	Felix Kogler	F	6'3"	Junior	Wescliff	Klagenfurt, Austria
40	Daniel Fiegel II	GK	6'0"	Freshman	Lockport	Lockport, New York (United States)

== All-time school records ==
- At the end of the 2024 season, the team holds an all time record of 296-503-83 overall and 98-158-32 in MAAC.
- Most wins were obtained in the 2012 (13-2-4) season.
- Most goals in a season were obtained in the 1970 (65) season.
- Most goals scored and biggest margin of victory happened 19 September 1970: Niagara 17 – Canisius 0.
- Most goals in a Single Game by a player Adrian Philip Humphries 19 September 1970 v. Canisius

== All-time head coaches ==
Years	Head Coach	Record	Postseason
1969–1970	Alphonse Montagna	19-7-1	–
1971–1972	Michael Gomez	16-3-2	–
1973	Adrian Philip Humphries	5-4-3	–
1974–1981	Jean Tassy	47-40-7	–
1982–1983	Richard White	9-12-3	–
1984	Niels Guldbjerg	4-8-0	–
1985–1990	Gus Campbell	37-52-5	–
1991–1992	Don Antonio	0-29-1	–
1993	Joe DeTommaso	2-13-0	–
1994–1995	Chris Spacone	0-31-0	–
1996–1997	Paul James	13-17-4	–
1998–2001	Tim Smith	12-59-4	–
2002–2011	Dermot McGrane	61-86-21	–
2011–2012	Chase Brooks	22-6-9	0–1
2013–2015	Eric Barnes	11-39-7	–
2016–	Bill Boyle	38-96-16	

== NCAA Division I Playoffs ==
Year	Location	Opponent	Result
2012	U-M Soccer Stadium, Ann Arbor	Michigan	L 3-1

== MAAC Season by season history since 2003 ==
Year	Conference	GP	W	L	D	PTS	PCT	Finish	Playoffs
2003	MAAC	9	4	4	1	13	.500	6th	Lost quarterfinals
2004	MAAC	9	2	6	1	7	.278	9th	Did not qualify
2005	MAAC	9	5	4	0	15	.556	4th	Lost First round
2006	MAAC	9	5	1	3	18	.722	2nd	Lost semifinals
2007	MAAC	9	3	5	1	10	.389	7th	Lost quarterfinals
2008	MAAC	9	5	3	1	16	.611	4th	Lost semifinals
2009	MAAC	9	5	3	1	16	.611	4th	Lost finals
2010	MAAC	9	5	3	1	16	.611	5th	Did not qualify
2011	MAAC	9	4	2	3	15	.611	4th	Lost quarterfinals
2012	MAAC	7	5	1	1	16	.786	3rd	Won MAAC Tournament
2013	MAAC	10	3	6	1	10	.350	9th	Did not qualify
2014	MAAC	10	2	6	2	8	.300	9th	Did not qualify
2015	MAAC	10	0	9	1	1	.050	11th	Lost Opening round
2016	MAAC	10	3	6	1	10	.350	9th	Did not qualify
2017	MAAC	10	1	8	1	4	.150	11th	Did not qualify
2018	MAAC	10	1	9	0	3	.100	10th	Did not qualify
2019	MAAC	10	3	6	1	10	.350	8th	Did not qualify
2020–21	MAAC	6	4	2	0	12	.667	3rd	Lost quarterfinals
2021	MAAC	10	6	4	0	18	.600	3rd	Lost quarterfinals
2022	MAAC	10	4	2	4	16	.417	4th	Lost semifinals
2023	MAAC	10	4	4	2	14	.500	5th	Lost quarterfinals
2024	MAAC	8	0	7	1	1	.062	13th	Did not qualify
Total	22 Seasons	202	74	101	27	249	.435		1 MAAC Championship

This only includes conference games.

In 2015–16, 2011–12, and 2007–08 every team made the playoffs.

== Notable players ==
- Anthony Di Biase, player of SC Toronto
- Carl Haworth, player of Ottawa Fury FC
- Micah Paulino, international player of the Guam national football team
- Adel Rahman, international player of the Pakistan national football team and Achilles '29
- Navid Rahman, international player of the Pakistan national football team and Achilles '29
