= 2012 Wake Forest Demon Deacons men's soccer team =

American college soccer season

2012 Atlantic Coast Conference men's soccer standings
	Conf.					Overall
Team	W		L		T	W		L		T
No. 3 Maryland †	6	–	1	–	1	20	–	1	–	3
No. 5 North Carolina	6	–	1	–	1	16	–	4	–	3
No. 22 Wake Forest	4	–	1	–	3	11	–	4	–	5
Clemson	3	–	2	–	3	6	–	9	–	5
Boston College	3	–	2	–	3	8	–	6	–	5
Virginia	3	–	4	–	1	10	–	7	–	4
Duke	3	–	4	–	1	8	–	8	–	2
NC State	1	–	7	–	0	10	–	10	–	0
Virginia Tech	0	–	7	–	1	7	–	10	–	3
† 2012 ACC Tournament winner As of December 11, 2012; Rankings from NSCAA

The 2012 Wake Forest Demon Deacons men's soccer team represented Wake Forest University during the 2012 NCAA Division I men's soccer season. It was the 49th season of the program. The Deacons played in the Atlantic Coast Conference, and qualified for the NCAA Tournament, before losing to Coastal Carolina.

== Roster ==
Source Note: Flags indicate national team as defined under FIFA eligibility rules; some limited exceptions apply. Players may hold more than one non-FIFA nationality.

No.	Pos.	Nation	Player
0	GK	USA	Andrew Harris
1	GK	USA	Michael Lisch
2	MF	USA	Jared Watts
3	DF	USA	Anthony Arena
4	DF	USA	Tolani Ibikunle
5	DF	USA	Sam Fink
6	MF	USA	Ross Tomaselli
7	MF	USA	Kyle Emerson
8	MF	USA	Luciano Delbono
9	FW	USA	Sean Okoli
10	FW	USA	Teddy Mullin
11	FW	BRA	Luca Gimenez
12	MF	USA	Kovi Konowiecki
13	MF	USA	Michael Gamble
14	MF	USA	Thomas Haws
15	DF	USA	Jalen Robinson
16	MF	USA	Alex Bramall

No.	Pos.	Nation	Player
17	FW	USA	Andy Lubahn
18	DF	USA	Chris Duvall
19	MF	USA	Collin Martin
20	DF	USA	Danny Wenzel
21	MF	USA	Ben Newnam
22	DF	USA	Andrew Powell
24	DF	USA	Ryan Powell
25	MF	USA	Ricky Greensfelder
26	DF	USA	Philip Parker
27	DF	USA	Andrew Malkiewicz
29	MF	USA	Sean Randolph
30	GK	USA	Alec Ferrell
31	GK	USA	David Myers
32	MF	USA	Jake Schemper
33	FW	USA	Sean Wilkinson
34	DF	CMR	Fabrice Momo

== Competitions ==
=== Regular season ===
==== Match results ====
2012-08-25	Wake Forest Demon Deacons	1 – 0	Wofford Terriers	Winston-Salem, North Carolina
19:00 UTC−05	Robinson 64'	Report		Stadium: Spry Stadium; Attendance: 3,695; Referee: Mark Kadlecik

2012-08-31	#23 Wake Forest Demon Deacons	3 – 1	Boston University Terriers	Winston-Salem, North Carolina
19:00 UTC−05	Duvall 18'; Gamble 57', 80'	Report	Powell 37'	Stadium: Spry Stadium; Attendance: 2,682; Referee: Mike Stutt

2012-09-02	#23 Wake Forest Demon Deacons	1 – 0	West Virginia Mountaineers	Winston-Salem, North Carolina
20:45 UTC−05	Fink 72'	Report		Stadium: Spry Stadium; Attendance: 548; Referee: Ted Unkel

2012-09-07	Clemson Tigers	1 – 1 (a.e.t.)	#15 Wake Forest Demon Deacons	Clemson, South Carolina
19:00 UTC−05	Sanchez 66' (pen.)	Report	Okoli 69'	Stadium: Riggs Field; Attendance: 6,188; Referee: Ted Unkel

2012-09-11	Louisville Cardinals	3 – 2 (a.e.t.)	#15 Wake Forest Demon Deacons	Louisville, Kentucky
19:00 UTC−05	Cochrane 12'; Farrell 16'; Smith 105'	Report	Okoli 65'; Arena 78'	Stadium: Cardinal Park Soccer and Track Stadium; Attendance: 928; Referee: Chico Grajeda

2012-09-15	#1 North Carolina Tar Heels	0 – 0 (a.e.t.)	#15 Wake Forest Demon Deacons	Chapel Hill, North Carolina
19:00 UTC−05		Report		Stadium: Fetzer Field; Attendance: 3,165; Referee: Tony Baumert

2012-09-18	#16 Wake Forest Demon Deacons	3 – 1	Georgia Southern Eagles	Winston-Salem, North Carolina
19:00 UTC−05	Robinson 13'; Gamble 21'; Gimenez 49'	Report	Ruggles 41'	Stadium: Spry Stadium; Attendance: 558; Referee: Jordan Shaw

2012-09-21	#16 Wake Forest Demon Deacons	0 – 0 (a.e.t.)	Duke Blue Devils	Winston-Salem, North Carolina
19:00 UTC−05		Report		Stadium: Spry Stadium; Attendance: 4,142; Referee: Landis Wiley

2012-09-25	#16 Wake Forest Demon Deacons	4 – 0	Appalachian State Mountaineers	Winston-Salem, North Carolina
19:00 UTC−05	Okoli 26'; Watts 37'; Martin 51'; Schemper 84'	Report		Stadium: Spry Stadium; Attendance: 514; Referee: Skye Arthur-Banning

2012-09-28	Virginia Tech Hokies	0 – 4	#16 Wake Forest Demon Deacons	Blacksburg, Virginia
19:00 UTC−05		Report	Gimenez 8', 41', 56' (pen.); Tomaselli 78'	Stadium: Virginia Tech Lacrosse and Soccer Stadium; Attendance: 864; Referee: Landis Wiley

2012-10-02	Davidson Wildcats	0 – 2	#15 Wake Forest Demon Deacons	Davidson, North Carolina
19:00 UTC−05	Gimenez 68'; Watts 78'	Report		Stadium: Alumni Soccer Stadium; Attendance: 1,814; Referee: Jeffrey Muschik

2012-10-06	#15 Wake Forest Demon Deacons	0 – 1	Boston College Eagles	Winston-Salem, North Carolina
19:00 UTC−05		Report	Rugg 57'	Stadium: Spry Stadium; Attendance: 1,514; Referee: Fotis Bazakos

2012-10-09	East Tennessee State Buccaneers	2 – 2 (a.e.t.)	#18 Wake Forest Demon Deacons	Johnson City, Tennessee
19:00 UTC−05	Geno 30'; Wilson 90'	Report	Okoli 43'; Gamble 57'	Stadium: Summers-Taylor Stadium; Attendance: 804; Referee: Skye Arthur-Banning

2012-10-12	Virginia Cavaliers	1 – 4	#18 Wake Forest Demon Deacons	Charlottesville, Virginia
19:00 UTC−05	Bates 79'	Report	Okoli 6'; Delbono 64'; Gamble 66'; Tomaselli 89'	Stadium: Klöckner Stadium; Attendance: 1,928; Referee: Brent Sorg

2012-10-19	#17 Wake Forest Demon Deacons	3 – 1	NC State Wolfpack	Winston-Salem, North Carolina
19:00 UTC−05	Okoli 33', 59', 70'	Report	Jackson-Atogi 50'	Stadium: Spry Stadium; Attendance: 3,486; Referee: Tony Crush

2012-10-23	Elon Phoenix	1 – 0	#13 Wake Forest Demon Deacons	Elon, North Carolina
19:00 UTC−05	Thomas 17' (pen.)	Report		Stadium: Rudd Field; Attendance: 689; Referee: Daniel Fitzgerald

2012-10-27	#13 Wake Forest Demon Deacons	3 – 1	South Carolina Gamecocks	Winston-Salem, North Carolina
19:00 UTC−05	Gimenez 33'; Okoli 38'; Gamble 58'	Report	Mangotic 27'	Stadium: Spry Stadium; Attendance: 1,512; Referee: Peter Dhima

2012-11-01	#18 Wake Forest Demon Deacons	4 – 2	#1 Maryland Terrapins	Winston-Salem, North Carolina
19:00 UTC−05	Okoli 15'; Tomaselli 59'; Gimenez 68'; Wenzel 77' (pen.)	Report	Stertzer 25'; Francois 41'	Stadium: Spry Stadium; Attendance: 3,548; Referee: Landis Wiley

=== ACC Tournament ===
2012-11-06 Quarterfinal	#13 Wake Forest Demon Deacons	2 – 2 (a.e.t.) (3 – 5 p)	Virginia Cavaliers	Winston-Salem, North Carolina
19:00 UTC−05	Gamble 22'; Okoli 51'	Report	Carroll 33'; Bird 56'	Stadium: Spry Stadium; Attendance: 362; Referee: Mohammad Samadpour
	Penalties
	Wenzel (penalty scored); Gamble (penalty scored); Gimenez (penalty scored); Mullin (penalty missed)		(penalty scored) Bates; (penalty scored) Silvester; (penalty scored) Wharton; (penalty scored) Carroll; (penalty scored) Cooke

=== NCAA Tournament ===
- Ranking indicates NCAA Tournament seeding.

2012-11-18 Second Round	#15 Wake Forest Demon Deacons	1 – 2 (a.e.t.)	Coastal Carolina Chanticleers	Winston-Salem, North Carolina
17:00 UTC−05	Gamble 4'	Report	Portillo 65'; Stourac 99'	Stadium: Spry Stadium; Attendance: 746; Referee: Mark Gorak
