= 1947 Maryland Terrapins men's soccer team =

American college soccer season

1947 Maryland Terrapins men's soccer

NSCAA No. 1 Team
- Conference: Independent
- Record: 6–0–1
- Head coach: Doyle Royal (2nd season)
- Captain: Jim Belt
- Home stadium: Old Byrd Stadium

The 1947 Maryland Terrapins men's soccer team represented University of Maryland, College Park during the 1947 ISFA season. It was the second season the program fielded a varsity men's soccer team. It was also the team's final year as an independent, before they moved to the Southern Conference.

The 1947 season was the first season the program earned a national end-of-season recognition, finishing atop the final NSCAA rankings for the 1947 season. Despite this, the ISFA awarded the Springfield College Pride the national title.

The team played seven matches during the season, accumulating a 6-0-1 record.

== Roster ==
Note: Flags indicate national team as defined under FIFA eligibility rules; some limited exceptions apply. Players may hold more than one non-FIFA nationality.

No.	Pos.	Nation	Player
—		(United States) USA	Charley Anacker
—	FW	(United States) USA	Jim Belt
—		(United States) USA	Ed Blank
—		(United States) USA	Tom Bourne
—		(United States) USA	Don Buck
—		(United States) USA	Dick Cleveland
—		(United States) USA	Tom Cox
—		(United States) USA	Davis Deibert
—		(United States) USA	Dick DiPasquale
—		(United States) USA	Fred Ewing
—		(United States) USA	Ken Fowler
—		(United States) USA	Irwin

No.	Pos.	Nation	Player
—		(United States) USA	Jackson
—		(United States) USA	Mike Kinder
—	MF	(United States) USA	John Linz
—		(United States) USA	Hank Miles
—		(United States) USA	Harold Moser
—		(United States) USA	Bill Norton
—		(United States) USA	Vernon Randall
—		(United States) USA	Ed Rieder
—		(United States) USA	Ed Rowan
—		(United States) USA	Al Salkowski
—		(United States) USA	Dan Terzi
—		(United States) USA	Clarence Whipp

== Schedule ==
Date Time, TV	Rank^{#}	Opponent^{#}	Result	Record	Site (Attendance) City, State
Regular season
10/04/1947*		Western Maryland	W 4–1	1–0–0	Old Byrd Stadium; College Park, MD
10/11/1947*	No. 7	Salisbury State	W 5–1	2–0–0	Old Byrd Stadium; College Park, MD
10/18/1947*	No. 6	No. 13 Loyola (MD)	T 4–4	2–0–1	Old Byrd Stadium; College Park, MD
10/25/1947*	No. 7	Virginia; Rivalry	W 3–0	3–0–1	Old Byrd Stadium; College Park, MD
10/31/1947*	No. 6	No. 10 Johns Hopkins	W 4–0	4–0–1	Old Byrd Stadium; College Park, MD
10/31/1947*	No. 3	No. 4 Navy	W 4–0	5–0–1	Old Byrd Stadium; College Park, MD
11/15/1947*	No. 2	at No. 6 Temple	W 3–1	6–0–1	Temple Stadium; Philadelphia, PA
*Non-conference game. ^{#}Rankings from United Soccer Coaches. (#) Tournament seedings in parentheses.

== Honors ==
Recipient	Award	Date	Ref.
Jim Belt	NSCAA All-American First Team	December 10, 1947	
Jim Belt	University of Maryland Athletics Hall of Fame	1992	
