= 2012 NCAA Division I men's soccer season =

NCAA Division I
- Season: 2012
- Champions: Indiana
- Highest scoring: 12: Tulsa 7–5 Oakland; Sept. 16, 2012

The 2012 NCAA Division I men's soccer season was the 54th season of NCAA men's college soccer in the United States. The defending champions were the University of North Carolina at Chapel Hill Tar Heels, who defeated sister school, the University of North Carolina at Charlotte 49ers in the previous College Cup championship.

Indiana defeated Georgetown, 1–0, in championship to win the title.

== Changes from 2011 ==
=== Coaching changes ===
College	Outgoing coach	Manner of departure	Incoming coach	Former position	Ref.
Michigan	(United States) Steve Burns	Resigned	(Canada) Chaka Daley	Providence head coach	
Providence	(Canada) Chaka Daley	Took Michigan job	(England) Craig Stewart	Franklin Pierce head coach	
Stanford	(United States) Bret Simon	Resigned	(England) Jeremy Gunn	Charlotte head coach	

== Season overview ==
=== Pre-season polls ===
Several American soccer outlets posted their own preseason top 25 rankings of what were believed to be the strongest men's collegiate soccer teams entering 2012.

NSCAA
Ranking	Team
1	North Carolina
2	UCLA
3	Creighton
4	Connecticut
5	South Florida
6	New Mexico
7	Louisville
8	Charlotte
9	Maryland
10	Akron
11	UC Santa Barbara
12	Indiana
13	UC Irvine
14	Boston College
15	St. John's
16	SMU
17	Coastal Carolina
18	Saint Mary's
19	James Madison
20	Northwestern
21	UAB
22	Brown
23	Old Dominion
24	Furman
25	Bradley

Soccer America
Ranking	Team
1	Connecticut
2	Akron
3	Maryland
4	UC Santa Barbara
5	Charlotte
6	North Carolina
7	New Mexico
8	UCLA
9	Indiana
10	South Florida
11	Boston College
12	Old Dominion
13	St. John's
14	Coastal Carolina
15	Creighton
16	Louisville
17	Northwestern
18	Notre Dame
19	Wake Forest
20	Furman
21	Duke
22	Xavier
23	West Virginia
24	SMU
25	UC Irvine

Fox Soccer/SBI
Ranking	Team
1	Akron
2	Connecticut
3	North Carolina
4	Maryland
5	UC Santa Barbara
6	Indiana
7	UCLA
8	Duke
9	West Virginia
10	Boston College
11	South Florida
12	St. John's
13	Louisville
14	Virginia
15	Xavier
16	New Mexico
17	Coastal Carolina
18	Creighton
19	SMU
20	Charlotte
21	CSU Bakersfield
22	Wake Forest
23	UC Irvine
24	Notre Dame
25	Georgetown

College Soccer News
Ranking	Team
1	North Carolina
2	New Mexico
3	Charlotte
4	Connecticut
5	Maryland
6	Akron
7	UCLA
8	South Florida
9	UC Santa Barbara
10	Coastal Carolina
11	Indiana
12	Boston College
13	Old Dominion
14	Creighton
15	UC Irvine
16	Northwestern
17	St. John's
18	Louisville
19	Wake Forest
20	UAB
21	SMU
22	Brown
23	Furman
24	Saint Mary's
25	Xavier

== Regular season ==
=== Standings ===
2012 America East men's soccer standings
	Conf.					Overall
Team	W		L		T	W		L		T
Vermont	5	–	0	–	2	8	–	5	–	5
UMBC†	4	–	2	–	1	11	–	4	–	7
Stony Brook	4	–	3	–	0	11	–	6	–	1
Boston University	3	–	2	–	2	6	–	8	–	4
Albany	3	–	4	–	0	6	–	11	–	1
New Hampshire	2	–	3	–	2	7	–	7	–	6
Binghamton	2	–	5	–	0	6	–	11	–	1
Hartford	1	–	5	–	1	7	–	9	–	1
As of December 11, 2012; Rankings from NCSAA

2012 Atlantic Coast Conference men's soccer standings
	Conf.					Overall
Team	W		L		T	W		L		T
No. 3 Maryland †	6	–	1	–	1	20	–	1	–	3
No. 5 North Carolina	6	–	1	–	1	16	–	4	–	3
No. 22 Wake Forest	4	–	1	–	3	11	–	4	–	5
Clemson	3	–	2	–	3	6	–	9	–	5
Boston College	3	–	2	–	3	8	–	6	–	5
Virginia	3	–	4	–	1	10	–	7	–	4
Duke	3	–	4	–	1	8	–	8	–	2
NC State	1	–	7	–	0	10	–	10	–	0
Virginia Tech	0	–	7	–	1	7	–	10	–	3
† 2012 ACC Tournament winner As of December 11, 2012; Rankings from NSCAA

2012 Atlantic 10 Conference men's soccer standings
	Conf.					Overall
Team	W		L		T	W		L		T
No. 23 Charlotte	7	–	1	–	1	15	–	4	–	3
No. 19 Saint Louis†	7	–	2	–	0	16	–	5	–	0
Xavier	6	–	1	–	2	14	–	3	–	5
No. 25 VCU	6	–	1	–	2	12	–	4	–	5
Temple	6	–	1	–	2	10	–	6	–	3
Dayton	5	–	3	–	1	11	–	5	–	2
La Salle	4	–	4	–	1	10	–	7	–	3
Duquesne	4	–	4	–	1	7	–	12	–	1
Butler	3	–	5	–	1	5	–	8	–	5
Rhode Island	3	–	5	–	1	4	–	11	–	3
St. Bonaventure	3	–	6	–	0	5	–	14	–	0
Fordham	2	–	4	–	3	6	–	7	–	4
Richmond	2	–	6	–	1	6	–	11	–	1
Massachusetts	2	–	7	–	0	5	–	11	–	2
George Washington	2	–	7	–	0	5	–	13	–	0
Saint Joseph's	1	–	6	–	2	5	–	11	–	2
As of December 11, 2012; Rankings from NCSAA

2012 Atlantic Sun Conference men's soccer standings
	Conf.					Overall
Team	W		L		T	W		L		T
FGCU†	6	–	1	–	1	11	–	5	–	3
Mercer	6	–	2	–	0	11	–	7	–	2
East Tennessee State	5	–	2	–	1	10	–	6	–	4
Northern Kentucky	4	–	3	–	1	7	–	10	–	1
USC Upstate	3	–	4	–	1	5	–	10	–	2
Lipscomb	3	–	4	–	1	7	–	10	–	1
Jacksonville	3	–	5	–	0	4	–	13	–	1
Stetson	2	–	5	–	1	3	–	10	–	2
North Florida	1	–	7	–	0	4	–	13	–	0
As of December 11, 2012; Rankings from NCSAA

2012 Big East men's soccer standings
	Conf.					Overall
Team	W		L		T	W		L		T
Blue
No. 2 Georgetown	6	–	2	–	0	19	–	4	–	3
No. 6 Connecticut	6	–	2	–	0	17	–	4	–	1
No. 15 Marquette	5	–	2	–	1	16	–	4	–	1
No. 8 Notre Dame†	5	–	2	–	1	17	–	4	–	1
Seton Hall	2	–	6	–	0	6	–	12	–	0
Providence	2	–	6	–	0	4	–	10	–	2
Pittsburgh	0	–	8	–	0	6	–	9	–	2
Red
No. 9 Louisville	7	–	1	–	0	14	–	6	–	1
No. 17 Syracuse	5	–	3	–	0	14	–	6	–	1
St. John's	4	–	3	–	1	10	–	5	–	4
Villanova	3	–	3	–	2	12	–	6	–	2
Cincinnati	3	–	3	–	2	6	–	9	–	4
Rutgers	3	–	4	–	1	7	–	7	–	1
South Florida	2	–	3	–	3	8	–	5	–	4
DePaul	1	–	6	–	1	4	–	10	–	3
As of December 11, 2012; Rankings from NCSAA

2012 Big South men's soccer standings
	Conf.					Overall
Team	W		L		T	W		L		T
No. 11 Coastal Carolina	10	–	0	–	0	20	–	3	–	2
Radford	7	–	2	–	1	10	–	6	–	4
Liberty	6	–	1	–	3	8	–	7	–	3
Campbell	7	–	3	–	0	12	–	5	–	2
High Point	5	–	3	–	2	12	–	5	–	3
Winthrop†	5	–	4	–	1	12	–	9	–	1
Gardner–Webb	3	–	5	–	2	4	–	14	–	2
Presbyterian	3	–	7	–	0	4	–	16	–	0
Longwood	2	–	7	–	1	3	–	12	–	3
VMI	1	–	8	–	1	2	–	14	–	1
UNC Asheville	0	–	9	–	1	1	–	15	–	1
As of November 9, 2012; Rankings from NCSAA

2012 Big Ten Conference men's soccer standings
	Conf.					Overall
Team	W		L		T	W		L		T
Penn State	3	–	1	–	2	9	–	5	–	3
No. 18 Northwestern	3	–	1	–	2	13	–	6	–	4
Michigan	3	–	2	–	1	11	–	10	–	1
No. 1 Indiana	3	–	2	–	1	16	–	5	–	3
Michigan State†	3	–	3	–	0	11	–	10	–	1
Wisconsin	1	–	3	–	2	6	–	8	–	5
Ohio State	0	–	4	–	2	6	–	10	–	3
As of December 11, 2012; Rankings from NSCAA

2012 Big West Conference men's soccer standings
	Conf.					Overall
Team	W		L		T	W		L		T
North
UC Davis	7	–	3	–	0	10	–	7	–	4
Cal Poly	6	–	3	–	1	11	–	7	–	1
Sacramento State	5	–	4	–	1	8	–	8	–	2
UC Santa Barbara	4	–	5	–	1	10	–	6	–	3
South
CSU Northridge†	7	–	3	–	0	15	–	7	–	0
CSU Fullerton	4	–	5	–	1	8	–	12	–	1
UC Riverside	3	–	7	–	0	10	–	8	–	0
UC Irvine	2	–	8	–	0	5	–	14	–	1
As of December 11, 2012; Rankings from NSCAA

2012 CAA men's soccer standings
	Conf.					Overall
Team	W		L		T	W		L		T
Drexel	8	–	1	–	1	12	–	4	–	3
Northeastern†	6	–	1	–	3	14	–	3	–	4
James Madison	6	–	2	–	2	9	–	7	–	3
Old Dominion	5	–	3	–	2	11	–	3	–	4
Hofstra	5	–	4	–	1	11	–	6	–	4
George Mason	4	–	5	–	1	11	–	6	–	2
UNC Wilmington	4	–	6	–	0	7	–	11	–	1
William & Mary	2	–	5	–	3	4	–	10	–	4
Delaware	2	–	5	–	3	4	–	11	–	4
Towson	2	–	6	–	2	4	–	10	–	2
Georgia State	2	–	8	–	0	6	–	12	–	0
As of December 11, 2012; Rankings from NSCAA

2012 Conference USA men's soccer standings
	Conf.					Overall
Team	W		L		T	W		L		T
SMU	6	–	2	–	0	10	–	5	–	5
No. 14 Tulsa†	5	–	2	–	1	14	–	6	–	1
UCF	5	–	3	–	0	8	–	7	–	3
Memphis	4	–	2	–	2	8	–	7	–	3
Kentucky	4	–	3	–	1	10	–	9	–	2
UAB	4	–	4	–	0	10	–	8	–	2
Marshall	3	–	5	–	0	11	–	5	–	1
South Carolina	2	–	5	–	1	5	–	11	–	2
FIU	0	–	7	–	1	8	–	8	–	2
As of December 11, 2012; Rankings from NSCAA

2012 Horizon League men's soccer standings
	Conf.					Overall
Team	W		L		T	W		L		T
Detroit	6	–	1	–	0	10	–	9	–	0
Cleveland State†	4	–	1	–	2	11	–	6	–	3
UIC	3	–	3	–	1	7	–	8	–	2
Valparaiso	2	–	2	–	3	6	–	9	–	5
Milwaukee	2	–	3	–	2	8	–	8	–	2
Loyola Chicago	2	–	3	–	2	5	–	11	–	2
Wright State	2	–	4	–	1	4	–	13	–	1
Green Bay	0	–	4	–	3	2	–	10	–	4
As of December 11, 2012; Rankings from NSCAA

2012 Ivy League men's soccer standings
	Conf.					Overall
Team	W		L		T	W		L		T
No. 20 Cornell†	6	–	1	–	0	15	–	2	–	0
Dartmouth	5	–	2	–	0	9	–	7	–	0
No. 16 Brown	4	–	1	–	2	13	–	3	–	3
Princeton	4	–	1	–	2	8	–	6	–	2
Columbia	2	–	3	–	2	4	–	8	–	4
Yale	1	–	3	–	3	4	–	8	–	5
Penn	1	–	6	–	0	3	–	13	–	0
Harvard	0	–	6	–	1	3	–	11	–	3
$ – Conference champion; As of December 11, 2012; Rankings from NSCAA

2012 MAAC men's soccer standings
	Conf.					Overall
Team	W		L		T	W		L		T
Loyola (Md.)	7	–	1	–	0	13	–	6	–	1
Siena	6	–	1	–	0	10	–	7	–	0
Niagara†	5	–	1	–	1	13	–	2	–	4
Iona	5	–	2	–	0	7	–	11	–	0
Fairfield	3	–	4	–	0	7	–	8	–	1
Saint Peter's	3	–	4	–	0	5	–	11	–	0
Rider	2	–	5	–	1	3	–	13	–	1
Manhattan	2	–	5	–	0	3	–	12	–	1
Canisius	1	–	6	–	0	8	–	7	–	2
Marist	1	–	6	–	0	5	–	10	–	1
As of December 11, 2012; Rankings from NSCAA

2012 Mid-American Conference men's soccer standings
	Conf.					Overall
Team	W		L		T	W		L		T
No. 7 Akron†	7	–	0	–	0	18	–	1	–	3
Northern Illinois	4	–	2	–	1	7	–	10	–	3
West Virginia	4	–	2	–	1	9	–	6	–	2
Bowling Green	3	–	3	–	1	8	–	9	–	3
Western Michigan	3	–	3	–	1	11	–	6	–	2
Buffalo	3	–	4	–	0	5	–	11	–	1
Hartwick	2	–	5	–	0	5	–	10	–	2
Florida Atlantic	0	–	7	–	0	2	–	13	–	1
As of December 11, 2012; Rankings from NSCAA

2012 Missouri Valley Conference men's soccer standings
	Conf.					Overall
Team	W		L		T	W		L		T
No. 4 Creighton†	5	–	0	–	1	16	–	4	–	2
SIU Edwardsville	4	–	2	–	0	13	–	7	–	0
Bradley	3	–	2	–	1	10	–	6	–	4
Evansville	3	–	2	–	1	9	–	8	–	1
Drake	2	–	2	–	2	6	–	11	–	4
Central Arkansas	1	–	4	–	1	8	–	9	–	1
Missouri State	0	–	6	–	0	5	–	8	–	4
As of December 11, 2012; Rankings from NSCAA

2012 MPSF men's soccer standings
	Conf.					Overall
Team	W		L		T	W		L		T
Mountain
No. 10 New Mexico	8	–	2	–	0	17	–	4	–	1
Air Force†	5	–	3	–	2	10	–	9	–	4
Denver	5	–	4	–	1	11	–	6	–	3
Houston Baptist	2	–	6	–	2	4	–	10	–	2
Pacific
CSU Bakersfield	6	–	3	–	1	9	–	5	–	5
San Jose State	5	–	4	–	1	8	–	9	–	1
UNLV	4	–	6	–	0	6	–	14	–	1
Seattle	1	–	8	–	1	3	–	13	–	1
As of December 11, 2012; Rankings from NSCAA

2012 Northeast Conference men's soccer standings
	Conf.					Overall
Team	W		L		T	W		L		T
Quinnipiac	8	–	1	–	1	10	–	4	–	3
No. 20 Fairleigh Dickinson†	6	–	1	–	3	11	–	6	–	6
Monmouth	6	–	2	–	2	11	–	4	–	4
Central Connecticut	6	–	3	–	1	8	–	8	–	2
Sacred Heart	5	–	5	–	0	9	–	8	–	0
Saint Francis (PA)	4	–	3	–	3	6	–	7	–	7
Bryant	4	–	5	–	1	6	–	8	–	2
St. Francis Brooklyn	4	–	6	–	0	7	–	10	–	1
Robert Morris	2	–	7	–	1	5	–	12	–	2
Mount St. Mary's	2	–	7	–	1	4	–	12	–	1
LIU Brooklyn	1	–	8	–	1	2	–	14	–	2
As of December 11, 2012; Rankings from NSCAA

2012 Pac-12 men's soccer standings
	Conf.					Overall
Team	W		L		T	W		L		T
No. 13 UCLA†	8	–	1	–	1	13	–	3	–	3
No. 24 Washington	7	–	1	–	2	13	–	5	–	3
Stanford	5	–	4	–	1	9	–	8	–	1
California	3	–	5	–	2	8	–	7	–	3
San Diego State	1	–	7	–	2	7	–	9	–	3
Oregon State	1	–	7	–	2	6	–	9	–	3
$ – Conference champion; As of December 11, 2012; Rankings from NSCAA

2012 Patriot League men's soccer standings
	Conf.					Overall
Team	W		L		T	W		L		T
American	5	–	0	–	2	11	–	6	–	2
Lafayette†	3	–	1	–	3	9	–	8	–	4
Colgate	3	–	1	–	3	5	–	8	–	6
Bucknell	2	–	3	–	2	7	–	8	–	5
Holy Cross	2	–	3	–	2	5	–	10	–	2
Lehigh	2	–	4	–	1	4	–	12	–	1
Army	1	–	3	–	3	4	–	10	–	3
Navy	1	–	4	–	2	7	–	7	–	3
As of December 11, 2012; Rankings from NSCAA

2012 Southern Conference men's soccer standings
	Conf.						Overall
Team	W		L		T	PCT	W		L		T	PCT
Elon ‍‍‡‍^{y}	5	–	2	–	0	.714	15	–	5	–	2	.727
Furman ‍‍‍	4	–	2	–	1	.643	12	–	4	–	3	.711
College of Charleston ‍‍‍	4	–	2	–	1	.643	8	–	10	–	1	.447
Georgia Southern ‍‍‍	3	–	3	–	1	.500	6	–	12	–	1	.342
UNC Greensboro ‍‍‍	3	–	4	–	0	.429	5	–	10	–	2	.353
Appalachian State ‍‍‍	2	–	3	–	2	.429	8	–	7	–	4	.526
Wofford ‍‍‍	2	–	4	–	1	.357	10	–	9	–	2	.524
Davidson ‍‍‍	2	–	5	–	0	.286	6	–	11	–	1	.361
‡ – 2012 SoCon Tournament champion y – Invited to the 2012 NCAA Division I Men's Soccer Championship; As of December 11, 2012; Rankings from NSCAA

2012 The Summit League men's soccer standings
	Conf.					Overall
Team	W		L		T	W		L		T
Oakland	5	–	1	–	1	11	–	7	–	1
UMKC	5	–	2	–	0	7	–	10	–	2
Western Illinois†	3	–	2	–	2	7	–	9	–	5
IPFW	3	–	3	–	1	4	–	15	–	1
Nebraska–Omaha	3	–	3	–	1	5	–	10	–	1
IUPUI	3	–	4	–	0	6	–	10	–	2
Oral Roberts	2	–	5	–	0	4	–	13	–	0
Eastern Illinois	1	–	5	–	1	3	–	13	–	1
As of December 11, 2012; Rankings from NSCAA

2012 West Coast Conference men's soccer standings
	Conf.					Overall
Team	W		L		T	W		L		T
No. 12 San Diego†	9	–	3	–	0	14	–	9	–	0
Santa Clara	8	–	2	–	2	11	–	6	–	2
Saint Mary's	5	–	4	–	3	9	–	5	–	5
Portland	5	–	5	–	2	7	–	9	–	3
San Francisco	4	–	5	–	3	6	–	7	–	5
Loyola Marymount	4	–	5	–	3	6	–	10	–	3
Gonzaga	0	–	11	–	1	4	–	14	–	1
$ – Conference champion; As of December 11, 2012; Rankings from NSCAA

2012 Division I men's soccer independents soccer records
	Conf.					Overall
Team	W		L		T	W		L		T
Adelphi	1	–	1	–	0	3	–	13	–	0
Belmont	0	–	0	–	0	6	–	8	–	3
Howard	1	–	0	–	0	3	–	15	–	1
NJIT	0	–	1	–	0	10	–	9	–	0
† No winner As of December 11, 2012; Rankings from NSCAA

=== Conference regular season and tournament winners ===
Conference	Regular Season Winner	Conference Tournament	Tournament Venue (City)	Tournament Winner
America East	Vermont	2012 America East Men's Soccer Tournament	Nickerson Field (Boston, Massachusetts)	UMBC
Atlantic Coast	Maryland	2012 ACC Men's Soccer Tournament	Maryland SoccerPlex (Boyds, MD)	Maryland
Atlantic 10	Charlotte	2012 Atlantic 10 Men's Soccer Tournament	Transamerica Field (Charlotte, NC)	Saint Louis
Atlantic Sun	FGCU	2012 Atlantic Sun Men's Soccer Tournament	Summers-Taylor Stadium (Johnson City, Tennessee)	FGCU
Big East	Red: Louisville; Blue: Connecticut	2012 Big East Men's Soccer Tournament	Red Bull Arena (Harrison, NJ)	Notre Dame
Big South	Coastal Carolina	2012 Big South Conference Men's Soccer Tournament	Bryan Park (Greensboro, NC)	Winthrop
Big Ten	Penn State	2012 Big Ten Conference Men's Soccer Tournament	Lakeside Field (Evanston, IL)	Michigan State
Big West	North: UC Davis; South: Cal State Northridge	2012 Big West Conference Men's Soccer Tournament	Aggies Soccer Field; Davis, CA	Cal State Northridge
Colonial	Drexel	2012 CAA Men's Soccer Tournament	Vidas Athletic Center (Philadelphia, PA)	Northeastern
Conference USA	SMU	2012 Conference USA Men's Soccer Tournament	West Campus Field (Birmingham, AL)	Tulsa
Horizon	Detroit	2012 Horizon League Men's Soccer Tournament	Titan Field (Detroit, MI	Cleveland State
Ivy	Cornell	No tournament		
Metro Atlantic	Loyola Maryland	2012 MAAC Men's Soccer Tournament	Tenney Stadium (Poughkeepsie, NY)	Niagara
Mid-American	Akron	2012 MAC Men's Soccer Tournament	FirstEnergy Stadium (Akron, Ohio)	Akron
Missouri Valley	Creighton	Missouri Valley Conference men's soccer tournament	Shea Stadium (Peoria, Illinois)	Creighton
Mountain Pacific	New Mexico	2012 MPSF Men's Soccer Tournament	CIBER Field (Denver, Colorado)	Air Force
Northeast	Quinnipiac	2012 Northeast Conference Men's Soccer Tournament	The Great Lawn (West Long Branch, New Jersey)	Fairleigh Dickinson
Pac-12	UCLA	No tournament		
Patriot	American	2012 Patriot League Men's Soccer Tournament	Riggs Field (Washington, D.C.)	Lafayette
Southern	Elon	2012 Southern Conference Men's Soccer Tournament	WakeMed Soccer Park (Cary, NC)	Elon
Summit	Oakland	2012 The Summit League Men's Soccer Tournament	John MacKenzie Alumni Field (Macomb, IL)	Western Illinois
West Coast	San Diego	No tournament		

== Statistics ==
Regular season statistics only. See 2012 NCAA Division I Men's Soccer Championship#Statistical leaders for the tournament statistics.

=== Overall ===
Top scorers

Rank	Scorer	College	Goals
1	(United States) Chris Thomas	Elon	23
2	(United States) Ryan Finley	Notre Dame	20
3	(Canada) Daniel Haber	Cornell	18
4	(El Salvador) Eriq Zavaleta	Indiana	16
5	(Jamaica) Ashton Bennett	Coastal Carolina	15
5	(United States) Erik Hurtado	UC Santa Barbara	15
5	(United States) Gyasi Zardes	CSU Bakersfield	15
8	(United States) Don Anding	Northeastern	14
8	(United States) Pete Caringi	UMBC	14
8	(United States) Billy Schuler	North Carolina	14
8	(United States) Steven Evans	Portland	14
8	(Israel) Sagi Lev-Ari	CSU Northridge	14
8	(United States) Devon Sandoval	New Mexico	14

Last updated on November 13, 2012. Source: NCAA.com – Total Goals

Most assists

Rank	Scorer	College	Assists
1	(United States) Mitchell Cardenas	Campbell	14
2	(United States) Kyle Bethel	Oakland	13
2	(Canada) Milo Kapor	UMBC	13
2	(United States) Blake Smith	New Mexico	13
5	(United States) Chris Griebsch	Hofstra	11
5	(United States) Steve Neumann	Georgetown	11
7	(Mexico) Carlos Benavides	CSU Northridge	10
7	(United States) Zach Bolden	Denver	10
7	(United States) Scott Caldwell	Akron	10
7	(United States) Jared Martinelli	Temple	10
7	(Uruguay) Alex Martinez	N.C. State	10
7	(Brazil) Pedro Ribeiro	Coastal Carolina	10
7	(Brazil) Shawn Sloan	High Point	10
7	(United States) Vaughn Spurrier	Temple	10

Last updated on November 13, 2012. Source: NCAA.com – Total Assists

== NCAA tournament ==
=== College Cup – Regions Park, Hoover, Alabama ===
National Semifinals; December 7
16	Indiana	1
12	Creighton	0
3	Georgetown	4(4)
2	Maryland	4(3)

National Championship; December 9
16	Indiana	1
3	Georgetown	0

== See also ==
- College soccer
- 2012 in American soccer
- 2012 NCAA Division I Men's Soccer Championship
