= 2012 ACC tournament =

2012 ACC tournament may refer to:

- 2012 ACC men's basketball tournament
- 2012 ACC women's basketball tournament
- 2012 ACC men's soccer tournament
- 2012 ACC women's soccer tournament
- 2012 Atlantic Coast Conference baseball tournament
- 2012 Atlantic Coast Conference softball tournament
