= 2012 Akron Zips men's soccer team =

Akron Zips
2012 season
- Athletic Director: (United States) Tom Wistrcill
- Head Coach: (United States) Caleb Porter
- MAC Regular Season: 1st
- MAC Tournament: Semifinals
- College Cup: Third round
Home colors	Away colors

The 2012 Akron Zips men's soccer team represented the University of Akron during the 2012 NCAA Division I men's soccer season.

== Competitions ==
=== Regular season ===
==== Standings ====
2012 Mid-American Conference men's soccer standings
	Conf.					Overall
Team	W		L		T	W		L		T
No. 7 Akron†	7	–	0	–	0	18	–	1	–	3
Northern Illinois	4	–	2	–	1	7	–	10	–	3
West Virginia	4	–	2	–	1	9	–	6	–	2
Bowling Green	3	–	3	–	1	8	–	9	–	3
Western Michigan	3	–	3	–	1	11	–	6	–	2
Buffalo	3	–	4	–	0	5	–	11	–	1
Hartwick	2	–	5	–	0	5	–	10	–	2
Florida Atlantic	0	–	7	–	0	2	–	13	–	1
As of December 11, 2012; Rankings from NSCAA

==== Match results ====
August 24, 2012 1	Florida Gulf Coast	0–4	#7 Akron	Akron, Ohio
19:35 EST	Vollmer (yellow card) 22'; Saravia (yellow card) 50'	Report	Stevenson 20'; Schmitt 57'; Quinn 63'; Derschang (yellow card) 65'; Caldwell 74'; Trapp (yellow card) 77'	Stadium: FirstEnergy Stadium; Attendance: 4,440; Referee: Vito Testa

August 31, 2012 2 Ameritas Classic	#7 Akron	1–1 (a.e.t.)	#2 Creighton	Omaha, Nebraska
19:35 EST		Report		Stadium: Morrison Stadium; Attendance: 3,077; Referee: Misail Tsapos

September 2, 2012 3 Ameritas Classic	#7 Akron	2–1	#23 SIU Edwardsville	Omaha, Nebraska
19:35 EST		Report		Stadium: Morrison Stadium; Attendance: 2,438; Referee: Troy Chors

=== MAC Tournament ===
November 9, 2012 Semifinals	(#4) Bowling Green	0–2	#8 (#1) Akron	Akron, Ohio
19:30 EST	Baraldi (yellow card) 85'	Report	Trapp 40'; Schmitt 42'	Stadium: FirstEnergy Stadium; Attendance: 2,386; Referee: Michael Allie

November 11, 2012 Final	(#2) Northern Illinois	0–2	#8 (#1) Akron	Akron, Ohio
16:30 ET	Godsey (yellow card) 75'		Abdul-Salaam 73'; Quinn 75'	Stadium: FirstEnergy Stadium; Attendance: 2,460; Referee: Khalaf Al-Latayfeh

=== NCAA Tournament ===
November 18, 2012 Second round	Michigan	1–2	#6 (#5) Akron	Akron, Ohio
4:30 PM EST	Murphy 62'	Report	Stevenson 43'; Schmitt 59'	Stadium: FirstEnergy Stadium; Attendance: 3,264; Referee: Edvin Jurisevic

November 25, 2012 Third round	#12 Creighton	1–1 (a.e.t.) (5–4 p)	#5 Akron	Akron, OH
4:30 PM EST	Pitter 83'	Report	Brenes 12'	Stadium: FirstEnergy Stadium; Attendance: 2,778; Referee: Chris Penso
	Penalties
	Castro (penalty scored); Ribeiro (penalty scored); Makh (penalty scored); Barnes (penalty scored); Pitter (penalty scored)		(penalty scored) Caldwell; (penalty scored) Brenes; (penalty scored) Stevenson; (penalty missed) Trapp; (penalty scored) Quinn
