= 2012 Maryland Terrapins men's soccer team =

Maryland Terrapins
2012 season
- Head Coach: Sasho Cirovski
- Stadium: Ludwig Field
- ACC: 1st
- ACC Tournament: Winners
- NCAA Tournament: Semifinals
- Highest home attendance: 11,074 vs. GU
- Lowest home attendance: 978 vs. VT
Home colors	Away colors

The 2012 Maryland Terrapins men's soccer team was the college's 67th season of playing organized men's college soccer. The Terrapins played in the Atlantic Coast Conference where they emerged as the regular season and tournament champions.

== Competitions ==
=== Preseason ===
August 17, 2012	#9 Maryland	3–3	#3 Creighton	Omaha, Nebraska
7:00 pm EDT	Stertzer 8'; Mullins 10'; Ambrose (yellow card) 15'; Eticha (yellow card) 39'; Raley 41'; Edwards (yellow card) 79'	Report	McCrary 34'; Pitter 39'; Miller (yellow card) 73'; Ribas 78'	Stadium: Morrison Stadium; Attendance: 2,091; Referee: Brent Wilson
Note: Since this was an exhibition, the match stood as a draw at the end of regulation.

August 20, 2012	Penn State	2–2	#9 Maryland	College Park, Maryland
7:30 pm EDT	Cardona (yellow card) 6' (goal) 20'; Minutillo 64'; Warming (yellow card) 66'	Report	Saint Cyr (yellow card) 17'; Stertzer 75'; Tshuma 78'	Stadium: Ludwig Field; Attendance: 251; Referee: John Brady
Note: Since this was an exhibition, the match stood as a draw at the end of regulation.

=== Regular season ===
==== ACC standings ====
2012 Atlantic Coast Conference men's soccer standings
	Conf.					Overall
Team	W		L		T	W		L		T
No. 3 Maryland †	6	–	1	–	1	20	–	1	–	3
No. 5 North Carolina	6	–	1	–	1	16	–	4	–	3
No. 22 Wake Forest	4	–	1	–	3	11	–	4	–	5
Clemson	3	–	2	–	3	6	–	9	–	5
Boston College	3	–	2	–	3	8	–	6	–	5
Virginia	3	–	4	–	1	10	–	7	–	4
Duke	3	–	4	–	1	8	–	8	–	2
NC State	1	–	7	–	0	10	–	10	–	0
Virginia Tech	0	–	7	–	1	7	–	10	–	3
† 2012 ACC Tournament winner As of December 11, 2012; Rankings from NSCAA

==== Match reports ====
Home team is listed on the right, away team is listed on the left.

August 26, 2012 1	#7 Louisville	0–3	#9 Maryland	College Park, Maryland
7:00 pm EDT	Akinsanya (yellow card) 87'	Report	Tshuma 9'; Metzger 30'; Stertzer 86'	Stadium: Ludwig Field; Attendance: 3,003; Referee: John Brady

August 31, 2012 2	#11 UCLA	2–2 (a.e.t.)	#6 Maryland	College Park, Maryland
7:30 pm EDT	Williams 9', 14' (yellow card) 96'; McKenna (yellow card) 86'	Report	Metzger 9'; Stertzer 68' (yellow card) 95'	Stadium: Ludwig Field; Attendance: 6,562; Referee: Ben Hichak

September 2, 2012 3	#22 California	0–6	#6 Maryland	College Park, Maryland
7:30 pm EDT	Bonomo (yellow card) 47'; Hallisey (yellow card) 82'; Jones (yellow card) 87'	Report	Sertzer 37'; Mullins 56'; Tshuma 65'; Endoh 70'; Shinsky (yellow card) 71'; Cyrus 80', 82'	Stadium: Ludwig Field; Attendance: 3,255; Referee: Jodi Fick

September 7, 2012 4	#6 Maryland	4–0	#24 Boston College	Chestnut Hill, Massachusetts
7:30 pm EDT	Francois 39'; Tshuma 49'; Pace 70'; Saint Cyr 81' (yellow card) 81'	Report	Boateng (yellow card) 9'; Bekker (yellow card) 64'	Stadium: Newton Soccer Complex; Attendance: 1,286; Referee: Jodi Fick

September 11, 2012 5	UMBC	1–3	#3 Maryland	College Park, Maryland
7:30 pm EDT	Paddock (yellow card) 56'; Dacres 62'; McCarron (yellow card) 79'	Report	Paddock 28' (o.g.); Edwards (yellow card) 57'; Mullins 71'; Pace 76'	Stadium: Ludwig Field; Attendance: 2,472; Referee: Andrew Chapin

September 14, 2012 6	#1 Maryland	3–2	#14 NC State	Raleigh, North Carolina
7:00 pm EDT	Edwards (yellow card) 26'; Pace 41'; Ambrose (yellow card) 46'; Tshuma 48'; Woodberry (yellow card) 49'; Sertzer 60'; Cyrus (yellow card) 61'; Leikvang (yellow card) 68'	Report	Martinez 5', 63'; Bokar (yellow card) 81'	Attendance: 2,342; Referee: Landis Wiley

September 18, 2012 7	#1 Maryland	cancelled	#20 Old Dominion	Norfolk, Virginia
6:00 pm EDT				Stadium: ODU Soccer Complex

September 21, 2012 8	Virginia Tech	0–2	#1 Maryland	College Park, Maryland
7:30 pm EDT		Report	Mullins 14'; Ambrose 43'; Metzger (yellow card) 61'	Stadium: Ludwig Field; Attendance: 4,043; Referee: Jodi Fick

September 24, 2012 9	Georgia State	0–4	#1 Maryland	College Park, Maryland
7:30 pm EDT	Crocker (yellow card) 80'	Report	Endoh 12'; Mullins 46', 49'; Pace 67'	Stadium: Ludwig Field; Attendance: 1,188; Referee: Jodi Fick

September 29, 2012 10	#1 Maryland	3–2	College of Charleston	Mount Pleasant, South Carolina
7:00 pm EDT	Woodberry 33', 84'; Kabelik 66'	Report	de Silva 19'; Twohig 43'	Stadium: Patriots Point Soccer Stadium; Attendance: 2,230; Referee: Roni Canales

October 5, 2012 11	Virginia	0–1	#1 Maryland	College Park, Maryland
7:00 pm EDT	Carroll (yellow card) 23'	Report	Mullins 26' (yellow card) 65'	Stadium: Ludwig Field; Attendance: 4,846; Referee: Shane Moody

October 9, 2012 12	Rutgers	1–2	#1 Maryland	College Park, Maryland
7:30 pm EDT	O'Rouke 2'	Report	Francois 7'; Mullins 32'; Cyrus 51'	Stadium: Ludwig Field; Attendance: 1,079

October 12, 2012 13	#1 Maryland	2–1	Duke	Durham, North Carolina
7:00 pm EDT	Sertzer 13'; Francois 42'	Report	Eggleston 27'	Stadium: Koskinen Stadium; Attendance: 973; Referee: Landis Wiley

October 16, 2012 14	Colgate	0–2	#1 Maryland	College Park, Maryland
7:30 pm EDT		Report	Tshuma 62'; Shinsky (yellow card) 75'; Mullins 85'	Stadium: Ludwig Field; Attendance: 1,553; Referee: Peter Walden

October 19, 2012 15	#2 North Carolina	0–1 (a.e.t.)	#1 Maryland	College Park, Maryland
6:00 pm EDT	Lovejoy (yellow card) 32'; McCrary (yellow card) 72'	Report	Stertzer (yellow card) 77'; Tshuma 99'	Stadium: Ludwig Field; Attendance: 7,340; Referee: Chico Grajeda

October 23, 2012 16	Lehigh	1–2	#1 Maryland	College Park, Maryland
7:30 pm EDT	Meyerkord 59'	Report	Mullins 12', 88'	Stadium: Ludwig Field; Attendance: 1,338; Referee: Mohammad Samadpour

October 27, 2012 17	Clemson	2–2 (a.e.t.)	#1 Maryland	College Park, Maryland
7:00 pm EDT	Stockinger 53'; Murphy 59'; Clowes (yellow card) 63'	Report	Mullins 2'; Tshuma 47'	Stadium: Ludwig Field; Attendance: 3,684; Referee: Andrew Chapin

November 1, 2012 18	#1 Maryland	2–4	#18 Wake Forest	Winston-Salem, North Carolina
7:00 pm EDT	Stertzer 25'; Shinsky (yellow card) 35'; Francois 41'; Woodberry (red card) 65'	Report	Okoli 15'; Tomaselli 59'; Gimenez 68'; Wenzel 77'	Stadium: Spry Stadium; Attendance: 3,548; Referee: Andrew Chapin

=== ACC Tournament ===
==== Bracket ====
Quarterfinals
1	Maryland	2
9	Virginia Tech	1
4	Clemson	0 (3)
5	Boston College	0 (1)
2	North Carolina	1
7	Duke	0
3	Wake Forest	2 (3)
6	Virginia	2 (5)

Semifinals
1	Maryland (2OT)	2
4	Clemson	1
2	North Carolina	0 (4)
6	Virginia	0 (3)

Championship
1	Maryland	2
2	North Carolina	1

==== Results ====
Number in parentheses indicates ACC Tournament seed. Other numbers indicate their NSCAA/NCAA Ranking.

November 6, 2012 Quarterfinals	(#9) Virginia Tech	1–2	#2 (#1) Maryland	College Park, Maryland
7:00 PM ET	Ranahan (yellow card) 42' (red card) 57'; Clemens 48' (yellow card) 73'; Prater (yellow card) 53'	Report	Stertzer 11' (yellow card) 57'; Mullins 52'	Stadium: Ludwig Field; Attendance: 798; Referee: Jodi Fick

November 9, 2012 Semifinals	(#4) Clemson	1–2 (a.e.t.)	#2 (#1) Maryland	Boyds, Maryland
8:00 PM ET	Amirkhanian 24'; Clowes (yellow card) 28'	Report	Ambrose (yellow card) 38'; Mullins 83'; Robinson 103' (o.g.)	Stadium: Maryland SoccerPlex; Attendance: 5,981; Referee: Ted Unkel

November 11, 2012 Final	#3 (#2) North Carolina	1–2	#2 (#1) Maryland	Boyds, Maryland
12:00 PM ET	Rice (yellow card) 36'; Garcia (yellow card) 45'; Lovejoy 86'	Report	Edwards 11'; Tshuma 62'	Stadium: Maryland SoccerPlex; Attendance: 9,341; Referee: Fotis Bazakos

=== NCAA Tournament ===
Number in parentheses represents the tournament seed. No number in parentheses indicates that the team was not seeded for the tournament. Any other rankings indicate the team's NSCAA/NCAA ranking.

November 18, 2012 Second round	#15 Brown	1–2	#2 (#2) Maryland	College Park, Maryland
5:00 pm EST	Belair 16'	Report	Mullins 44'; Metzger 90'	Stadium: Ludwig Field; Attendance: 1,663; Referee: Dan Fitzgerald

November 25, 2012 Third round	#13 Coastal Carolina	1–5	#2 (#2) Maryland	College Park, Maryland
5:00 PM EST	Bennett 21'	Report	Eticha 13'; Mullins 22'; Jane 60', 64'; Raley 86'	Stadium: Ludwig Field; Attendance: 1,847

December 1, 2012 Quarterfinals	#17 (#10) Louisville	1–3	#2 (#2) Maryland	College Park, Maryland
5:00 EST	Foxhoven 40'	Report	Woodberry 34'; Pace 45'; Mullins 68'	Stadium: Ludwig Field; Attendance: 3,556; Referee: Lou Labbadia

==== College Cup ====
December 7, 2012 Semifinals	#6 (#3) Georgetown	4–4 (a.e.t.) (4–3 p)	#2 (#2) Maryland	Hoover, Alabama
5:00 PM EST	Neumann 33' 34' 61'; Allen 48'	Report	Tshuma 22' 59'; Mullins 74'; Francois 76'	Stadium: Regions Park; Attendance: 11,074; Referee: Chris Penso
	Penalties
	Neumann (penalty scored); Muller (penalty missed); Christianson (penalty scored); Riemer (penalty scored); Nealis (penalty scored)		(penalty scored) Stertzer; (penalty scored) Woodberry; (penalty scored) Mullins; (penalty missed) Kemp; (penalty missed) Leikvang
