= 2012 Georgetown Hoyas men's soccer team =

Georgetown Hoyas
2012 season
- Head Coach: Brian Wiese
- Stadium: North Kehoe Field
- Big East: Division: T-2nd; Overall: T-2nd
- Big East Tournament: Runners-up
- NCAA Tournament: Runners-up
Home colors	Away colors

The 2012 Georgetown Hoyas men's soccer team represented Georgetown University during the 2012 NCAA Division I men's soccer season. The team participated in the Big East Conference, and reached the 2012 NCAA Championship, losing to Indiana in the final.

== Competitions ==
=== Regular season ===
==== Standings ====
2012 Big East men's soccer standings
	Conf.					Overall
Team	W		L		T	W		L		T
Blue
No. 2 Georgetown	6	–	2	–	0	19	–	4	–	3
No. 6 Connecticut	6	–	2	–	0	17	–	4	–	1
No. 15 Marquette	5	–	2	–	1	16	–	4	–	1
No. 8 Notre Dame†	5	–	2	–	1	17	–	4	–	1
Seton Hall	2	–	6	–	0	6	–	12	–	0
Providence	2	–	6	–	0	4	–	10	–	2
Pittsburgh	0	–	8	–	0	6	–	9	–	2
Red
No. 9 Louisville	7	–	1	–	0	14	–	6	–	1
No. 17 Syracuse	5	–	3	–	0	14	–	6	–	1
St. John's	4	–	3	–	1	10	–	5	–	4
Villanova	3	–	3	–	2	12	–	6	–	2
Cincinnati	3	–	3	–	2	6	–	9	–	4
Rutgers	3	–	4	–	1	7	–	7	–	1
South Florida	2	–	3	–	3	8	–	5	–	4
DePaul	1	–	6	–	1	4	–	10	–	3
As of December 11, 2012; Rankings from NCSAA

==== Match results ====
August 24, 2012 1	Virginia	1–2 (a.e.t.)	Georgetown	Germantown, Maryland
7:30 pm ET	Salandy-Defour (yellow card) 59'; Carroll 70'; James (yellow card) 82'	Report	Neumann 1'; Allen (yellow card) 60'; Thomsen 96' (o.g.)	Stadium: Maryland SoccerPlex; Attendance: 1,157; Referee: Shawn Fitch

August 27, 2012 2	FGCU	0–1	Georgetown	Washington, D.C.
1:00 pm ET				Stadium: North Kehoe Field

=== Big East Tournament ===
November 3, 2012 Quarterfinals	#18 (R2) St. John's	1–2	#6 (B2) Georgetown	Washington, D.C.
1:00 pm ET	Parker 48'; L'Esperance (yellow card) 68'	Report	Neumann 26'; Allen 66'	Stadium: Hoyas Stadium; Attendance: 983; Referee: Paul Williams

November 9, 2012 Semifinals	#10 (B4) Marquette	1–2 (a.e.t.)	#6 (B2) Georgetown	Chester, Pennsylvania
5:00 pm ET	Dillon (yellow card) 31'; Lysak 57'; Selvaggi (yellow card) 58'	Report	Neumann 45'; Allen 110'	Stadium: PPL Park; Referee: Lou Labbadia

November 11, 2012 Final	#3 (B3) Notre Dame	3–2 (a.e.t.)	#6 (B2) Georgetown	Chester, Pennsylvania
12:00 pm ET	Finley 51' (yellow card) 63' 109'; O'Malley (yellow card) 59'; Besler 90'	Report	Reimer 39', 82'; Christianson (yellow card) 98'	Stadium: PPL Park; Referee: Hilano Grajedo

=== NCAA Tournament ===
November 18, 2012 Second round	#18 Charlotte	0–1	#6 (#3) Georgetown	Washington, DC
1:00 pm EST		Report	Allen 43'	Stadium: North Kehoe Field; Attendance: 859; Referee: Mark Kadlecik

November 25, 2012 Third round	Syracuse	1–1 (a.e.t.) (2–4 p)	#6 (#3) Georgetown	Washington, D.C.
1:00 pm EST	Vale 29'	Report	Allen 85'	Stadium: North Kehoe Field; Attendance: 970; Referee: Daniel Fitzgerald
	Penalties
	Pasanen (penalty missed); Perea (penalty scored); Brode (penalty scored); Murrell (penalty missed)		(penalty scored) Neumann; (penalty scored) Christianson; (penalty scored) Riemer; (penalty scored) Nealis

December 1, 2012 Quarterfinals	#23 San Diego	1–3	#6 (#3) Georgetown	Washington, D.C.
1:00 pm EST	Ringhof 50'	Report	OG 51'; Snoh 73'; Riemer 88'	Stadium: North Kehoe Field; Attendance: 1,927; Referee: John McCloskey

==== College Cup ====
December 7, 2012 Semifinals	#6 (#3) Georgetown	4–4 (a.e.t.) (4–3 p)	#2 (#2) Maryland	Hoover, Alabama
5:00 pm EST	Neumann 33' 34' 61'; Allen 48'	Report	Tshuma 22' 59'; Mullins 74'; Francois 76'	Stadium: Regions Park; Attendance: 11,074; Referee: Chris Penso
	Penalties
	Neumann (penalty scored); Muller (penalty missed); Christianson (penalty scored); Riemer (penalty scored); Nealis (penalty scored)		(penalty scored) Stertzer; (penalty scored) Woodberry; (penalty scored) Mullins; (penalty missed) Kemp; (penalty missed) Leikvang

December 9, 2012 Final	#22 (#16) Indiana	1–0	#6 (#3) Georgetown	Hoover, Alabama
2:00 pm EST	Kotlov 64'	Report		Stadium: Regions Park; Attendance: 9,242; Referee: Hilario Grajeda
