= Chris Little =

Scottish footballer and coach

Personal information
- Date of birth: 1977 or 1978 (age 47–48)
- Place of birth: Edinburgh, Scotland
- Position: Midfielder

Team information
- Current team: Nashville SC (assistant manager)

Youth career
- –1996: AFC Bournemouth

College career
Years	Team	Apps	(Gls)
1996–2000	UNC Pembroke Braves	58	(29)

Senior career*
Years	Team	Apps	(Gls)
2000	Wilmington Hammerheads	8	(0)
Total		8	(0)

Managerial career
- 2001–2002: UNC Pembroke Braves (assistant)
- 2003–2005: Cumberlands Patriots
- 2008–2009: Carolina Dynamo (assistant)
- 2010–2013: Elon Phoenix (assistant)
- 2013–2014: Carolina Dynamo
- 2014–2016: Elon Phoenix
- 2017–2018: Seattle Sounders FC (academy)
- 2019–2020: Tacoma Defiance
- 2021–2023: Colorado Rapids (assistant)
- 2023: Colorado Rapids (interim)
- 2023–: Colorado Rapids (assistant)
- * Club domestic league appearances and goals

Chris Little is a Scottish-born football coach and former player. He is currently an assistant coach for Major League Soccer side Colorado Rapids. He was previously head coach of Tacoma Defiance, the second-division affiliate of Seattle Sounders FC. He played professionally for the Wilmington Hammerheads of the USL Second Division and previously coached various amateur and college teams in North Carolina and Kentucky.

== College career ==
Little was born in Edinburgh, Scotland and raised in the English city of Swindon. He played for the AFC Bournemouth Academy, but left at the age of 18 to pursue a college scholarship at the University of North Carolina at Pembroke. During his four years at UNC Pembroke, he played 58 matches for the Braves as a midfielder and recorded 29 goals and 23 assists. Little captained the Braves for two seasons and was inducted into the university's Athletic Hall Of Fame in 2012. He graduated from UNC Pembroke in 2000 with a bachelor's degree in History and in 2002 with a master's degree in physical education.

== Club career ==
Little was signed to a professional contract with the Wilmington Hammerheads of the USL Second Division in 2000 and became a starting midfielder and forward.

== Coaching career ==
Little returned to UNC Pembroke in 2001 as an assistant coach for two years. He was named the head coach of Cumberland College in 2003 and lead the team to a 20th-place rank in the 2004 NAIA national poll and to the final of the NAIA Region XI tournament. Little returned to North Carolina to manage various youth football organisations in the Greensboro area before accepting a role as assistant coach for the Carolina Dynamo from 2008 to 2009.

Little was named an assistant coach at Elon University in 2010 and was promoted to head coach in 2014 following the departure of Darren Powell. During his tenure at Elon, the team won four conference championships and qualified for three editions of the NCAA Tournament. Little also returned to the Carolina Dynamo as head coach in 2013.

In 2017, Little joined Seattle Sounders FC as an academy coach and trainer. He managed several academy teams to national championships and was named the 2018 U-16/17 U.S. Development Academy West Division Coach of the Year. Little received his Elite Formation Coaching License from Major League Soccer in 2018 and spent time with the training staff of Atlético Madrid under the program. On 23 January 2019 the Sounders announced that Little would take over as head coach of the Tacoma Defiance reserves team while retaining his role as the Sounders FC Academy Director of Coaching.

On 26 February 2021, Little left Tacoma to join Colorado Rapids as an assistant coach.

=== Managing record ===
As of match played October 21, 2023

Coaching record by team and tenure
Team	Nat	From	To	Record							
Team	Nat	From	To	G	W	D	L	GF	GA	GD	Win %
Colorado Rapids (interim)	(United States)	September 5, 2023		8	2	2	4	10	15	−5	25.00

== Personal life ==
Little is married to Kara-Lyn, a former volleyball player at UNC Pembroke, and has two children.

== Honors ==
=== Coach ===
NC Youth Association

- ODP National Tournament: 2006 (shared), 2007

US Academy (U16)

- US Soccer National Youth Championships: 2009

Elon Phoenix

- SoCon Championship: 2011, 2012 (as assistant)
- SoCon Championship Regular Season: 2012 (as assistant)
- CAA Championship Regular Season: 2015 (shared)

=== Individual ===
- UNCP Most Outstanding Player: 2000
- UNCP Athletics Hall of Fame: 2012 Inductee
- NSCAA South Region Assistant Coach of the Year: 2012
- NSCAA Midwest Region Coach of the Year: 2015
