= 2012 Summit League men's soccer tournament =

2012 The Summit League men's soccer tournament

Tournament details
- Country: United States
- Teams: 4

Final positions
- Champions: Western Illinois
- Runners-up: Oakland

The 2012 Summit League men's soccer tournament was the seventh edition of the four-team tournament. The tournament decided The Summit League champion and guaranteed representative into the 2012 NCAA Division I Men's Soccer Championship. The tournament was held from November 7–10, 2012 with the higher seed hosting each match.

== Bracket ==
Semifinals
1	Oakland	5
4	IPFW	1
2	UMKC	0
3	Western Illinois	1 (OT)

Championship
1	Oakland	1
3	Western Illinois	3

== Schedule ==
=== Semifinals ===
November 9, 2012	IPFW	1–5	Oakland	Macomb, IL
11:00 CST	Helton 19'; Falkenstern (yellow card) 24'; Ackerman 50'	Report	Dudley 18'; Bethel 22'; Cheslik 37'; Lipari 63'; Hoy 86'	Stadium: John MacKenzie Alumni Field; Attendance: 210; Referee: Shane Butler

November 9, 2012	Western Illinois	1–0 (a.e.t.)	UMKC	Macomb, IL
14:00 CST	Esangbedo (yellow card) 86'; Ortega (yellow card) 89'; Bruinsma 95'	Report	Reece (yellow card) 25'; Pino (yellow card) 83'; McCarthy (yellow card) 91'	Stadium: John MacKenzie Alumni Field; Attendance: 532; Referee: Shane Butler

=== Championship ===
November 11, 2012	Western Illinois	3–1	Oakland	Macomb, IL
12:00 CST				Stadium: John MacKenzie Alumni Field

== Statistical leaders ==
=== Goalscorers ===
A total of 11 goals were scored over 3 matches, for an average of 3.67 goals per match.

3 goals

- (United States) Nathan Bruinsma - Western Illinois

1 goal

- (United States) Kyle Ackerman - Fort Wayne
- (United States) Kyle Bethel - Oakland
- (United States) Tyler Chavez - Western Illinois
- (United States) Jeff Cheslik - Oakland
- (United States) Matt Dudley - Oakland
- (United States) Gavin Hoy - Oakland
- (United States) Miche'le Lipari - Oakland
- (United States) Joey Tinnion- Oakland

== See also ==
- The Summit League
- 2012 The Summit League men's soccer season
- 2012 NCAA Division I men's soccer season
- 2012 NCAA Division I Men's Soccer Championship
