= 2012 Big East Conference men's soccer tournament =

2012 Big East men's soccer tournament
Tournament details
- Country: United States
- Teams: 12

Final positions
- Champions: Notre Dame
- Runners-up: Georgetown

The 2012 Big East men's soccer tournament was the 17th edition of the tournament, and the last to be organized by the original Big East Conference. The event decided the Big East Conference champion and guaranteed representative into the 2012 NCAA Division I Men's Soccer Championship. Held from October 31–November 11, it was the first men's college soccer conference tournament to begin in the 2012 season. The semifinal and championship rounds were held for the third-consecutive year at Red Bull Arena, in Harrison, New Jersey.

St. John's were the defending champions, having defeated Connecticut 1–0 in the 2011 championship.

By the end of the 2012–13 school year, the Big East split into two leagues along football lines. The seven schools that did not sponsor FBS football left to form a new Big East Conference, while the FBS schools that did not leave for other conferences stayed in the original Big East structure under the new name of American Athletic Conference.

== Qualification ==
2012 Big East men's soccer standings
	Conf.					Overall
Team	W		L		T	W		L		T
Blue
No. 2 Georgetown	6	–	2	–	0	19	–	4	–	3
No. 6 Connecticut	6	–	2	–	0	17	–	4	–	1
No. 15 Marquette	5	–	2	–	1	16	–	4	–	1
No. 8 Notre Dame†	5	–	2	–	1	17	–	4	–	1
Seton Hall	2	–	6	–	0	6	–	12	–	0
Providence	2	–	6	–	0	4	–	10	–	2
Pittsburgh	0	–	8	–	0	6	–	9	–	2
Red
No. 9 Louisville	7	–	1	–	0	14	–	6	–	1
No. 17 Syracuse	5	–	3	–	0	14	–	6	–	1
St. John's	4	–	3	–	1	10	–	5	–	4
Villanova	3	–	3	–	2	12	–	6	–	2
Cincinnati	3	–	3	–	2	6	–	9	–	4
Rutgers	3	–	4	–	1	7	–	7	–	1
South Florida	2	–	3	–	3	8	–	5	–	4
DePaul	1	–	6	–	1	4	–	10	–	3
As of December 11, 2012; Rankings from NCSAA

== Bracket ==
First round
R5	Cincinnati	0
B4	Marquette	3

First round
B5	Seton Hall	1
R4	Villanova	3

Quarterfinals
R1	Louisville	1
B4	Marquette	2
B2	Georgetown	2
R3	St. John's	1
B1	Connecticut	1
R4	Villanova	0
R2	Syracuse	2
B3	Notre Dame	4

Semifinals
B4	Marquette	1
B2	Georgetown (2OT)	2
B1	Connecticut	0
B3	Notre Dame	1

Championship
B2	Georgetown	2
B3	Notre Dame	3

== Schedule ==
Note: Home team is listed on the left, away team is listed on the right.

=== First round ===
October 31, 2012	Cincinnati	0–3	Marquette	Milwaukee, WI
20:00 ET		Report	Sjöberg 21'; Islami 42'; Huftalin 83'	Stadium: Valley Fields; Attendance: 257; Referee: Dave Jaworski

November 1, 2012	Seton Hall	1–3	Villanova	Philadelphia, PA
14:00 ET	Garcia 72'	Report	Gonzalez 10'; Soroka (yellow card) 40' (goal) 51'; Harr 88'	Stadium: Villanova Soccer Complex; Referee: Brian Fenlon

=== Quarterfinals ===
November 3, 2012	St. John's	1–2	Georgetown	Washington, D.C.
13:00 ET	Parker 48'; L'Esperance (yellow card) 68'	Report	Neumann 26'; Allen 66'	Stadium: Hoyas Stadium; Attendance: 983; Referee: Paul Williams

November 3, 2012	Marquette	2–1	Louisville	Louisville, KY
19:00 ET	Selvaggi (yellow card) 28'; Sjöberg 35'; Ciesiulka 45'; Dillon (yellow card) 67'	Report	Foxhoven 85'	Stadium: Cardinal Park Soccer and Track Stadium; Attendance: 1,544; Referee: Troy Cohrs

November 3, 2012	Notre Dame	4–2	Syracuse	Syracuse, NY
19:00 ET	Hodan 63', 77'; Richard 64'; Finley 84'	Report	Cribley 15'; Passanen (yellow card) 42'; Clark 49'; Vale (yellow card) 86'	Stadium: SU Soccer Stadium; Attendance: 1,675; Referee: Sean Nilly

November 4, 2012	Villanova	0–1	Connecticut	Storrs, CT
15:00 ET	Umar (yellow card) 63'	Report	Fochive (yellow card) 39'; Diouf 40'	Stadium: Morrone Stadium; Attendance: 4,720; Referee: Hayden Crust

=== Semifinals ===
November 9, 2012	Marquette	1–2 (a.e.t.)	Georgetown	Chester, PA
5:00 PM ET	Dillon (yellow card) 31'; Lysak 57'; Selvaggi (yellow card) 58'	Report	Neumann 45'; Allen 110'	Stadium: PPL Park; Referee: Lou Labbadia

November 9, 2012	Notre Dame	1–0	Connecticut	Chester, PA
7:30 PM ET	Powers 11'	Report	Beso (yellow card) 80'	Stadium: PPL Park; Referee: Bill Dittmar

=== Big East Championship ===
November 11, 2012	Notre Dame	3–2 (a.e.t.)	Georgetown	Chester, PA
12:00 PM ET	Finley 51' (yellow card) 63' 109'; O'Malley (yellow card) 59'; Besler 90'	Report	Reimer 39', 82'; Christianson (yellow card) 98'	Stadium: PPL Park; Referee: Hilano Grajedo

== Statistical leaders ==
Note: Statistics only for post-season games.

=== Top scorers ===
Rank	Scorer	College	Goals
1	(United States) Andy Huftalin	Marquette Golden Eagles	1
1	(United States) Kelmend Islami	Marquette	1
1	(Sweden) Axel Sjöberg	Marquette	1

=== Most assists ===
Rank	Player	College	Assists
1	(United States) Bryan Ciesiulka	Marquette	1
1	(United States) Paul Dillon	Marquette	1
1	(United States) Kelmend Islami	Marquette	1
1	(Sweden) Sebastian Jansson	Marquette	1

== See also ==
- Big East Conference
- 2012 Big East Conference men's soccer season
- 2012 NCAA Division I men's soccer season
- 2012 NCAA Division I Men's Soccer Championship
