= Doyle Royal =

American soccer coach (1919–2020)

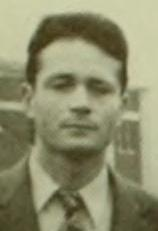
- Royal at Maryland in 1949

Biographical details
- Born: January 29, 1919; Washington, D.C., U.S.
- Died: September 29, 2020 (aged 101)

Playing career
- 1939–1943: Maryland

Coaching career (HC unless noted)

Soccer
- 1946–1973: Maryland

Tennis
- 1954–1980: Maryland

Head coaching record
- Overall: 217–58–18 (soccer); 296–114–1 (tennis)
- Tournaments: 12–12–1 (NCAA)

Accomplishments and honors

Championships
- Soccer: 1 NCAA Championship (1968); 17 ACC Championships (1953–1968, 1971); 3 Southern Conference Championships; Tennis: 2 ACC Championships (1957, 1964)

Doyle P. Royal (January 29, 1919 – September 29, 2020) was an American collegiate soccer and tennis coach. He coached the University of Maryland soccer team from 1946 to 1973, and the tennis team from 1954 to 1980.

== Early life ==
Royal was a native of Washington, D.C. from a poor family. In 1939, the University of Maryland tennis head coach, Lesley Bopst, offered him a job and room to enroll at the college. At Maryland, he played both tennis and soccer. Royal served in the United States Army during World War II.

== Coaching career ==
He became Maryland's first men's soccer head coach in 1946 and served in that position until 1973. In 28 years, the coach compiled a 217–58–18 (.771) record, including a 94–12–6 (.866) mark against Atlantic Coast Conference competition. His winning percentage ranks No. 1 all time among Maryland head coaches, and his number of wins rank No. 2 all time. He led Maryland to the 1968 National Championship, where they tied Michigan State, 2–2, to share the national title. Under Royal, Maryland won 17 Atlantic Coast Conference championships, including 16 outright. The Terrapins captured the conference title each year from 1953 to 1968, sharing the honors with North Carolina in 1966, and added another outright title in 1971.

He was also the school's men's tennis head coach. Royal served as the Maryland tennis from 1954 to 1980 and teams compiled a 296–114–1 record. His combined 513 wins with two different Maryland sports ranks second to Burton Shipley, who amassed 610 wins in basketball and baseball. Royal was also an assistant dean of men at the university.

The University of Maryland Athletic Hall of Fame inducted Royal in 1988. In 1997, he was residing in Bethesda, Maryland.

== Later life and death ==
In 2019, Doyle celebrated his 100th birthday in Bethesda, Maryland at the Edgemoor Club. There he was presented with a 1968 men's soccer championship ring by Sascho Cirovski, the current head coach of Maryland soccer.

Royal died in September 2020 of natural causes at the age of 101.
