= 2012 MAC men's soccer tournament =

Tournament details
- Country: United States
- Teams: 4

Final positions
- Champions: Akron
- Runner-up: Northern Illinois

The 2012 Mid-American Conference men's soccer tournament was the 20th edition of the four-team tournament. The tournament decided the Mid-American Conference champion and guaranteed representative into the 2012 NCAA Division I Men's Soccer Championship. The tournament was held from November 9–11, 2012 with the higher seed hosting each match.

== Bracket ==
Semifinals
1	Akron	2
4	Bowling Green	0
2	Northern Illinois	1
3	West Virginia	0

MAC Championship
1	Akron	2
2	Northern Illinois	0

== Schedule ==
=== Semifinals ===
November 9, 2012	West Virginia	0–1	Northern Illinois	Akron, OH
16:00 EST		Report	Leseth 33'; Stevenson (yellow card) 58'	Stadium: FirstEnergy Stadium; Attendance: 2,386; Referee: Brandon Artis

November 9, 2012	Bowling Green	0–2	Akron	Akron, OH
19:30 EST	Baraldi (yellow card) 85'	Report	Trapp 40'; Schmitt 42'	Stadium: FirstEnergy Stadium; Attendance: 2,386; Referee: Michael Allie

=== Championship ===
November 11, 2012	Northern Illinois	0–2	Akron	Akron, OH
16:30 ET	Godsey (yellow card) 75'		Abdul-Salaam 73'; Quinn 75'	Stadium: FirstEnergy Stadium; Attendance: 2,460; Referee: Khalaf Al-Latayfeh

== See also ==
- Mid-American Conference Men's Soccer Tournament
- 2012 Mid-American Conference men's soccer season
- 2012 NCAA Division I men's soccer season
- 2012 NCAA Division I Men's Soccer Championship
