= 2012 Southern Conference men's soccer tournament =

2012 SoCon men's soccer tournament
Tournament details
- Country: United States
- Teams: 8

Final positions
- Champions: Elon
- Runners-up: Wofford

2012 Southern Conference men's soccer standings
	Conf.						Overall
Team	W		L		T	PCT	W		L		T	PCT
Elon ‍‍‡‍^{y}	5	–	2	–	0	.714	15	–	5	–	2	.727
Furman ‍‍‍	4	–	2	–	1	.643	12	–	4	–	3	.711
College of Charleston ‍‍‍	4	–	2	–	1	.643	8	–	10	–	1	.447
Georgia Southern ‍‍‍	3	–	3	–	1	.500	6	–	12	–	1	.342
UNC Greensboro ‍‍‍	3	–	4	–	0	.429	5	–	10	–	2	.353
Appalachian State ‍‍‍	2	–	3	–	2	.429	8	–	7	–	4	.526
Wofford ‍‍‍	2	–	4	–	1	.357	10	–	9	–	2	.524
Davidson ‍‍‍	2	–	5	–	0	.286	6	–	11	–	1	.361
‡ – 2012 SoCon Tournament champion y – Invited to the 2012 NCAA Division I Men's Soccer Championship; As of December 11, 2012; Rankings from NSCAA

The 2012 Southern Conference men's soccer tournament is the seventeenth edition of the tournament. The tournament decided the Southern Conference champion and guaranteed representative into the 2012 NCAA Division I Men's Soccer Championship. The tournament was held November 3–10, 2012. Top-seed Elon defeated 7th-seed Wofford 2–1 in the Championship game.

== Bracket ==
Quarterfinals
1	Elon	2
8	Davidson	1
4	Georgia Southern (a.e.t.)	2
5	UNC Greensboro	1
2	Furman	1
7	Wofford	2
3	College of Charleston	1
6	Appalachian State	2

Semifinals
1	Elon	1
4	Georgia Southern	0
7	Wofford	1 (4)
6	Appalachian State	1 (2)

Championship
1	Elon	2
7	Wofford	1

== Schedule ==
=== Quarterfinals ===
November 3, 2012	Appalachian State	2–1	College of Charleston	Charleston, SC
14:00 EST	Williams (yellow card) 15'; McCarter (yellow card) 39'; Lee-Him (yellow card) 46'; Trower 76'; Toure 78'; White (yellow card) 90'	Report	Delbridge 15' (o.g.) de Silva (yellow card) 40'; Huggett (yellow card) 51'	Stadium: Patriots Point Soccer Stadium; Attendance: 324; Referee: Nick Vlattas

November 3, 2012	Wofford	2–1	Furman	Greenville, SC
18:00 EST	Gonzalez (yellow card) 19' (goal) 83'; Davis 22'	Report	Henning 15'	Stadium: Stone Soccer Stadium; Attendance: 632; Referee: Abbas Piran

November 3, 2012	Davidson	1–2	Elon	Elon, NC
19:00 EST	Givens 2'; Rivera (yellow card) 68'	Report	Latigue 65'; Thomas 76'	Stadium: Rudd Field; Attendance: 717; Referee: Mark Gorak

November 4, 2012	UNC Greensboro	1–2 (a.e.t.)	Georgia Southern	Statesboro, GA
16:00 EST				Stadium: Eagle Field

=== Semifinals ===
November 8, 2012	Georgia Southern	0–1	Elon	Cary, NC
5:00 PM ET	Lane (yellow card) 44'	Report	Thomas 36'; Wescoe (yellow card) 80'	Stadium: WakeMed Soccer Park; Attendance: 314; Referee: Brandon Marion

November 8, 2012	Wofford	1–1 (a.e.t.) (4–2 p)	Appalachian State	Cary, NC
7:30 PM ET	Vienne (yellow card) 34'; Hutchins 56'; Lasso (yellow card) 88'; Davis (yellow card) 111'	Report	McCarter (yellow card) 30'; Toure 58'; Lee-Him (yellow card) 99'; Free (yellow card) 111'	Stadium: WakeMed Soccer Park; Attendance: 314; Referee: Daniel Fitzgerald
	Penalties
	Hutchins (penalty missed); Jaramillo (penalty scored); Davis (penalty scored); Lasso (penalty scored); Vienne (penalty scored)		(penalty scored) Lee-Him; (penalty scored) Broaden; (penalty missed) Williams; (penalty missed) Lavigne

=== SoCon Championship ===
November 10, 2012	Wofford	1–2	Elon	Cary, NC
7:00 PM ET	Vienne 71'	Report	Wescoe 9'; Latigue 75'	Stadium: WakeMed Soccer Park; Attendance: 648; Referee: Chris Penso

== See also ==
- Southern Conference
- 2012 Southern Conference men's soccer season
- 2012 NCAA Division I men's soccer season
- 2012 NCAA Division I Men's Soccer Championship
