= 2012 Virginia Cavaliers men's soccer team =

Virginia Cavaliers
2012 season
- Head Coach: George Gelnovatch
- ACC: 6th
- ACC Tournament: Semifinals
- NCAA Tournament: Second round
- UVA Tournament: 2–0–0
- Big East/ACC Challenge: Runners-up
Home colors	Away colors

The 2012 Virginia Cavaliers men's soccer team represented the University of Virginia during the 2012 NCAA Division I men's soccer season. It was the program's 72nd season of existence, their 72nd in NCAA Division I, and their 59th season of playing in the Atlantic Coast Conference.

== Background ==
The Cavaliers entered the 2012 season after a first round exit from the 2011 NCAA Division I Men's Soccer Championship for a second straight year, as well as a defeat in the semifinals of the 2011 ACC Men's Soccer Tournament. It was the second straight season of failing to win any conference or NCAA soccer tournament since their triumph in 2009.

== Competitions ==
=== Preseason ===
August 14, 2012	#15 St. John's	0–1	Virginia	Charlottesville, Virginia
7:00 pm EDT				Stadium: Klöckner Stadium

August 18, 2012	Liberty	0–3	Virginia	Charlottesville, Virginia
7:00 pm EDT		Report	Carroll 10'; James 48' (pen.); Madison 57'	Stadium: Klöckner Stadium

=== Regular season ===
==== ACC standings ====
2012 Atlantic Coast Conference men's soccer standings
	Conf.					Overall
Team	W		L		T	W		L		T
No. 3 Maryland †	6	–	1	–	1	20	–	1	–	3
No. 5 North Carolina	6	–	1	–	1	16	–	4	–	3
No. 22 Wake Forest	4	–	1	–	3	11	–	4	–	5
Clemson	3	–	2	–	3	6	–	9	–	5
Boston College	3	–	2	–	3	8	–	6	–	5
Virginia	3	–	4	–	1	10	–	7	–	4
Duke	3	–	4	–	1	8	–	8	–	2
NC State	1	–	7	–	0	10	–	10	–	0
Virginia Tech	0	–	7	–	1	7	–	10	–	3
† 2012 ACC Tournament winner As of December 11, 2012; Rankings from NSCAA

==== Match results ====
August 24, 2012 1	Georgetown	2–1 (a.e.t.)	Virginia	Germantown, Maryland
pm ET				Stadium: Maryland SoccerPlex

August 31, 2012 2	#22 California	1–2	Virginia	Charlottesville, Virginia
pm ET				Stadium: Klöckner Stadium

September 2, 2012 3	#11 UCLA	1–0 (a.e.t.)	Virginia	Charlottesville, Virginia
4:00 PM PDT	Sofia (yellow card) 31' 100'; Wiet (yellow card) 73'	Report	Somerville (yellow card) 41'; Madison (yellow card) 74'; Salandy-Defour (yellow card) 82'	Stadium: Klöckner Stadium; Attendance: 2,015; Referee: Mohammad Samadpour

September 7, 2012 4	Duke	0–1	Virginia	Charlottesville, Virginia
pm ET				Stadium: Klöckner Stadium

September 11, 2012 5	Mount St. Mary's	1–6	Virginia	Charlottesville, Virginia
pm ET				Stadium: Klöckner Stadium

September 14, 2012 6	#19 Xavier	1–1	Virginia	Charlottesville, Virginia
pm ET				Stadium: Klöckner Stadium

September 18, 2012 7	Drexel	0–2	Virginia	Charlottesville, Virginia
pm ET				Stadium: Klöckner Stadium

September 21, 2012 8	#24 Virginia	0–1	#8 North Carolina	Chapel Hill, North Carolina
pm ET				Stadium: Fetzer Field

September 25, 2012 9	#24 Virginia	1–0 (a.e.t.)	#25 VCU	Richmond, Virginia
pm ET				Stadium: Sports Backers Stadium; Attendance: 2,247

10	v
pm ET

11	v
pm ET

12	v
pm ET

13	v
pm ET

14	v
pm ET

15	v
pm ET

16	v
pm ET

17	v
pm ET

18	v
pm ET

=== ACC Tournament ===
November 6, 2012 Quarterfinals	(#6) Virginia	2–2 (a.e.t.) (5–3 p)	#16 (#3) Wake Forest	Winston-Salem, North Carolina
7:00 pm ET	Carroll 33'; Bird 56'; Poarch (yellow card) 80'	Report	Gamble 22'; Okoli 51'	Stadium: Spry Stadium; Attendance: 362; Referee: Mohammad Samadpour
	Penalties
	Bates (penalty scored); Silvester (penalty scored); Wharton (penalty scored); Carroll (penalty scored); Cooke (penalty scored)		(penalty scored) Wenzel; (penalty scored) Gamble; (penalty scored) Gimenez; (penalty missed) Mullin

November 9, 2012 Semifinals	(#6) Virginia	0–0 (a.e.t.) (3–4 p)	#4 (#2) North Carolina	Boyds, Maryland
5:30 pm ET	Wharton (yellow card) 87'	Report		Stadium: Maryland SoccerPlex; Attendance: 5,981; Referee: Brent Sorg
	Penalties
	Bates (penalty scored); Silvester (penalty missed); Wharton (penalty scored); Carroll (penalty scored); Cooke (penalty missed)		(penalty missed) Lovejoy; (penalty scored) Murphy; (penalty scored) George; (penalty scored) Walters; (penalty scored) Gafa

=== NCAA Tournament ===
November 15, 2012 First round	Lafayette	0–1	Virginia	Charlottesville, Virginia
1:30 pm EST		Report	Bates 88'	Stadium: Klöckner Stadium; Attendance: 356; Referee: Mohammad Samadpour

November 18, 2012 Second round	Virginia	1–3	#10 (#13) New Mexico	Albuquerque, New Mexico
9:00 pm EST	Brown 48'	Report	Venter 6'; Rogers 58'; Calderon 90'	Stadium: UNM Soccer Complex; Attendance: 3,121; Referee: Alex Gorrin
