= Elon Phoenix men's soccer =

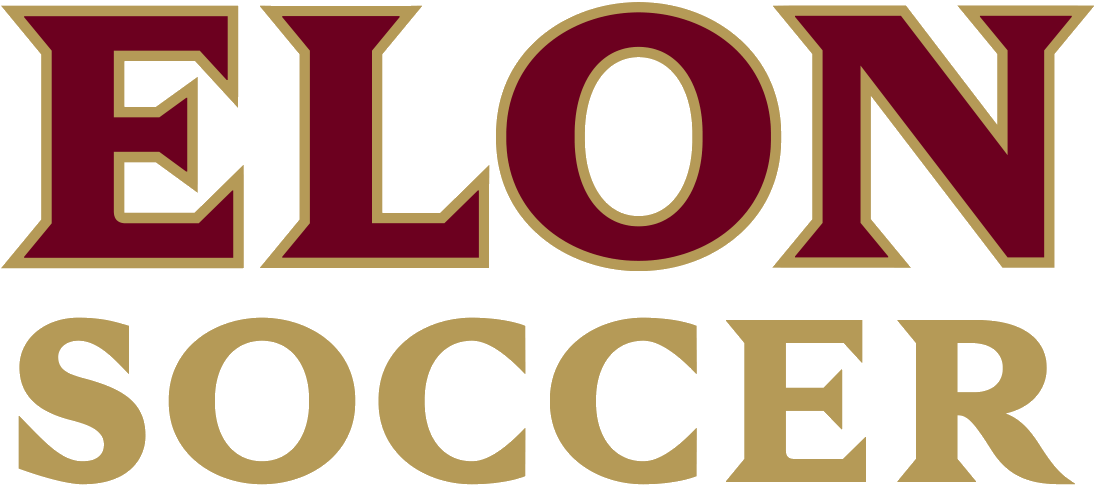
- Founded: 1972; 54 years ago
- University: Elon University
- Head coach: Marc Reeves (6th season)
- Conference: CAA
- Location: Elon, North Carolina, US
- Stadium: Rudd Field
- Nickname: Phoenix
- Colors: Maroon and gold
Home	Away

NCAA tournament Round of 32
- 2013, 2015

NCAA tournament appearances
- 2011, 2012, 2013, 2015, 2022, 2025

Conference tournament championships
- 2011, 2012, 2013, 2025

Conference regular season championships
- 2012, 2015

The Elon Phoenix men's soccer team is a varsity intercollegiate athletic team of Elon University located in Elon, North Carolina. The team is a member of the Coastal Athletic Association (CAA), which is part of the National Collegiate Athletic Association's Division I.

The team was founded in 1972 as a member of the NAIA. In 1989, the team moved to NCAA Division II and finally to NCAA Division I in 1999. The program is currently under the direction of head coach Marc Reeves.

Elon Soccer won its first conference championship in 2008, the Southern Conference regular season. This was followed up in 2009 with the team's first appearance in the SoCon Championship game. The program has largely improved since its introduction to Division I in 1999. The team joined the Colonial Athletic Association on July 1, 2014.

== History ==
=== The 1970s: first steps ===
Elon men's soccer played their inaugural season in the fall of 1972 , more precisely on 13 October, when they earned a 2–1 victory over Guilford College Charles Harris served as the Fightin' Christians' first head coach

Elon competed in the NAIA as a member of the Carolinas Conference (CIAC). Faced with the challenge of building a program virtually from scratch, Coach Harris and the Fightin' Christians had mixed results. After debuting with a 2–1 victory over Greensboro College on October 13, 1972, the team would lose its last four games to finish the inaugural season with a 1–4 record. By the 1977 season, Elon was still seeking its first winning-season in men's soccer. The Charles Harris era set a 16–40–4 cumulative record in 6 seasons.

A 6–6 (2–4 CIAC) record in 1976 stood as the best season in the brief history of Elon soccer as Steve Ballard took over as head coach in the Fall of 1978. Coach Ballard and the Fightin' Christians would need just two seasons to better that mark and subsequently take the program to the next level. The team struggled during Ballard's rookie year as head coach, finishing the year with a 2–11–1 (0–6 CIAC) record. The Fightin' Christians rebounded in 1979 to finish the decade with the first winning season in program history with an 8–6–2 (2–3–1 CIAC) record. Elon also qualified for the NAIA District 26 Playoffs that season, and though they were defeated by High Point 5–0, the 1979 team proved to those outside the program that Elon soccer had arrived. The decade set a total record of 26–57–7

=== The 1980s: program growth ===
The 1980s brought more "firsts" and continued growth for Elon soccer. The 1980 campaign marked the first winning season in CIAC play for the Fightin' Christians as the team went 6–1 in conference matches (8–8 overall). Following the CIAC success of 1980, Elon would have just one losing record in conference play (in 1986) until they left the CIAC following the 1988 season.

The winning ways of the 80s were not limited to CIAC matches. Elon made the NAIA District 26 Playoffs seven times from 1980 to 1988. This included the 1985 team which offensive went 13–3–1 (6–1–1 CIAC) and scored 57 goals. The team went on an 11-game unbeaten streak (a figure that is still tied for the Elon record), and amassed eight school records that include: goals scored (57), goals per match (3.35), assists (54), assists per match (3.18), points (168), points per match (9.88), shots (399), and shots per match (23.5). Despite all those records, Elon fell 1–0 to High Point in the playoffs. This marked the third time Elon had been defeated by High Point in the district 26 playoffs since 1980.

The 1987 squad, under the direction of head coach Steve Ballard, is considered to be one of the best in Elon soccer history. After underperforming in their 1986 campaign, finishing 9–8–1 (3–4–1 CIAC) and losing to Guilford in PKs in the playoffs, the 1987 team aimed to show significant improvements from the previous year. The 1987 Fightin' Christians went 16–3–1 (6–1–1 CIAC) and defeated High Point 1–0 to win the NAIA District 26 championship. Despite losing 1–0 to West Virginia Wesleyan in the NAIA Area VII Tournament, the team still had one of the most outstanding seasons in program history. Their 16 victories, .825 win percentage, and 11 game winning/unbeaten streak are all still Elon records (or shared Elon records).

Elon's final year as a member of the NAIA in 1988 ended with the Fightin' Christians claiming another District 26 Championship and finishing with a record of 14–4–2 (4–2–2 CIAC). First-year head coach Rob Brewer, much like Ballard the year before, was winning with defense. The 1988 team still sets the Elon single season standard for goals against average (.75) and fewest goals allowed (12). They rode this prolific defense all the way to the second round of the NAIA Area VII Regional Tournament, where they ultimately fell to Alderson-Broaddus 3–0.

From a scorer offense in 1985 to stifling defense in 1987 and 1988, the teams of the mid 80s set new records for the competition. The cliche "defense wins championships" came true and Elon won its back to back District 26 Championships. In fact, the 1987 and 1988 squads shared the record for most shutouts in a season (9) until 2009.

1988 signaled the end of an era for Elon soccer, as the school would transition to NCAA Division II and the South Atlantic Conference (SAC) in 1989. The 1980s decade set a record of 103–61–14.

=== The 1990s: from NAIA to NCAA ===
Change was not initially kind to the Elon soccer program. The program's success of the late 1980s in the NAIA did not carry over into the 1990s in NCAA Division II.

Head coach Rob Brewer led the Fightin' Christians to winning seasons in 1992 and 1995 with final records of 10–5–2 (5–2) SAC and 9–8 (2–6 SAC), respectively. However, those would be the only two seasons in which the team finished with a .500 or better record. In 1996, Mike Reilly took over as head coach in 1996 during a transition to NCAA Division I.

The team struggled in 1996, Reilly's first year at the helm, and the last season in Division II. After finishing the season winless, (0–13–2, 0–6–1 SAC) and setting a school record for saves made in a season with 248, the Fightin' Christians finished their tenure on SAC and Division II. Elon now embarked on two NCAA-mandated transition years before it could become a full-member of Division I. Elon set a combined record of 7–27–2 from 1997 to 1998.

The team went 3–14 (0–7 Big South) in 1999, the program's first season as a member of NCAA Division I and the Big South Conference. During those years, the athletics division also adopted the Phoenix mascot. The decade set a record of 51–110–10.

=== 2000–2004: SoCon ===
The Phoenix opened the new millennium with a .500 season (10–10, 3–4 Big South), but then followed it up with four consecutive losing seasons. The 2003 squad went for a 6–11–1 overall, including a win vs 25th-ranked South Carolina 1–0. That win marked the first victory by the Phoenix over a nationally ranked team since moving to Division I.

Head coach Mike Reilly, who had led the team through the transition to NCAA Division I, now led the team as it moved from the Big South to the Southern Conference in 2003, where they remain to this day.

The first two seasons in the SoCon, 2003 and 2004, proved difficult for the Phoenix. The teams finished 1–5–1 in SoCon play both years, and after five seasons in Division I the Phoenix were still searching for a winning record (both overall and in-conference).

=== 2005–present ===
Darren Powell arrived at Elon in 2005 looking to bring some of the success he had enjoyed as a player and assistant coach at UNC-Greensboro to Elon. As a player, Powell helped the Spartans to two NCAA Tournament berths in 1993 and 1994. Later, with Powell serving as an assistant coach, the Spartans posted a 55–26–3 record in Powell's four seasons on the bench. They also became the #1 team in the nation at one point in 2004. For his efforts, Powell was honored as one of the top NCAA Division I assistant coaches by College Soccer News.

In the first season under Powell's coaching, Elon finished 9–9–2 (4–2–1 SoCon) in 2005. This marked just the second non-losing season for the team since joining Division I. It was also the first winning record in conference play since moving to D1. Powell was honored as the Southern Conference Coach of the Year for 2005. The 2006 squad clinched Elon soccer's first winning season in Division I finishing 10–8–2 (3–3–1 SoCon). The team was also ranked as high as #22 in the Soccer America poll after a 6–1 start, which included a win over then #17 UAB. The Phoenix continued to build in 2007 going 8–7–4 (4–3–0 SoCon) including a tie against top-ranked, and eventual national champion, Wake Forest.

The 2008 Elon finished the regular season with a perfect 7–0–0 record in-conference (10–9–1 overall). The team entered the SoCon Tournament aiming to secure their first NCAA Tournament bid in program history. After leading 1–0 at the half, the Phoenix fell-apart in the 2nd half allowing four goals to College of Charleston, and Elon's historic season ended with a 4–1 loss. Although the team fell short of its ultimate goal, the SoCon regular season championship was the first DI league title for Elon. Junior midfielder Justin Wyatt was named SoCon Player of the Year, and Coach Powell earned SoCon Coach of the Year honors for the second time.

Elon started the 2009 season going 0–2–1 in their first three matches, but they would recover to win six of the next eight, a stretch which included 2–1 losses to nationally ranked ACC rivals Wake Forest and Duke. The team also picked up just the second win over an ACC opponent since 1999 with a 2–0 defeat of Clemson. Matches against ACC teams such as West Virginia and Charlotte (among others) are a part of Coach Powell's continued efforts to schedule tough non-conference matches before going into SoCon.

The team finished 4–2–0 in a wide-open season in the Southern Conference (SoCon). Elon ultimately finished second, behind Wofford, in the final regular season standings. With a record of 9–7–2 heading into the SoCon Tournament, the Phoenix would likely have to win in order to secure a berth in the NCAA Tournament. A 2–0 win over Charleston led them to play v Wofford for the title. The Terriers, playing on their home field as the #1 seed, jumped out to a 2–0 lead before the Phoenix were able to get one back. Wofford was able to hold on and took the game, SoCon title, and automatic berth in the NCAA Tournament with a 2–1 victory.

=== Conference titles ===
Elon won three consecutive conference titles playing in the SoCon in 2011, 2012, and 2013. In 2025, the team won their fourth conference title and the first in the Coastal Athletic Association (CAA) tournament after defeating Stony Brook 3–0.

== Players ==
=== Current roster ===
As of Aug 2026

Note: Flags indicate national team as defined under FIFA eligibility rules; some limited exceptions apply. Players may hold more than one non-FIFA nationality.

No.	Pos.	Nation	Player
0	GK	USA	Marshall Martin
1	GK	USA	Drew Hartman
2	DF	USA	Caleb Frakes
3	DF	ENG	Joe Taylor
4	DF	DEN	Magnus Jacobsen
5	DF	MEX	Carlos Levy
6	DF	USA	Weston Jonke
7	FW	BAH	Jordin Wilson
8	MF	IRL	Daire McCarthy
9	FW	GER	Dominik Renz
10	FW	CHI	Martin Kozak
11	MF	USA	Alex Wharton
12	MF	USA	Oscar Tonidandel

No.	Pos.	Nation	Player
13	GK	ENG	Mikolaj Lenarcik
14	DF	JPN	Kosei Sasaki
15	DF	NOR	Tønnes Daland
16	MF	ITA	Diego Thompson
17	MF	GER	Henry Mertsch
18	FW	USA	Will Dunn
19	MF	DEN	Noah Sonne Kargo
20	FW	USA	Mohamed Kallon
21	MF	USA	JP Quigley
22	FW	USA	Robbie Reeves
23	MF	USA	Jahmir Flowers
24	DF	USA	Corbyn Wendorf
26	GK	USA	Tristan D'Adamo

=== Players in the MLS ===
The SoCon has a rich soccer tradition, having produced players such as US Internationals Clint Dempsey and Ricardo Clark (both from Furman). One soccer writer, while comparing each of the NCAA soccer conferences to a European professional league, compared the SoCon to Super League Greece stating: "Watch the league, you will see good players. Just no one outside the conference will believe that until they make (the) big stage".

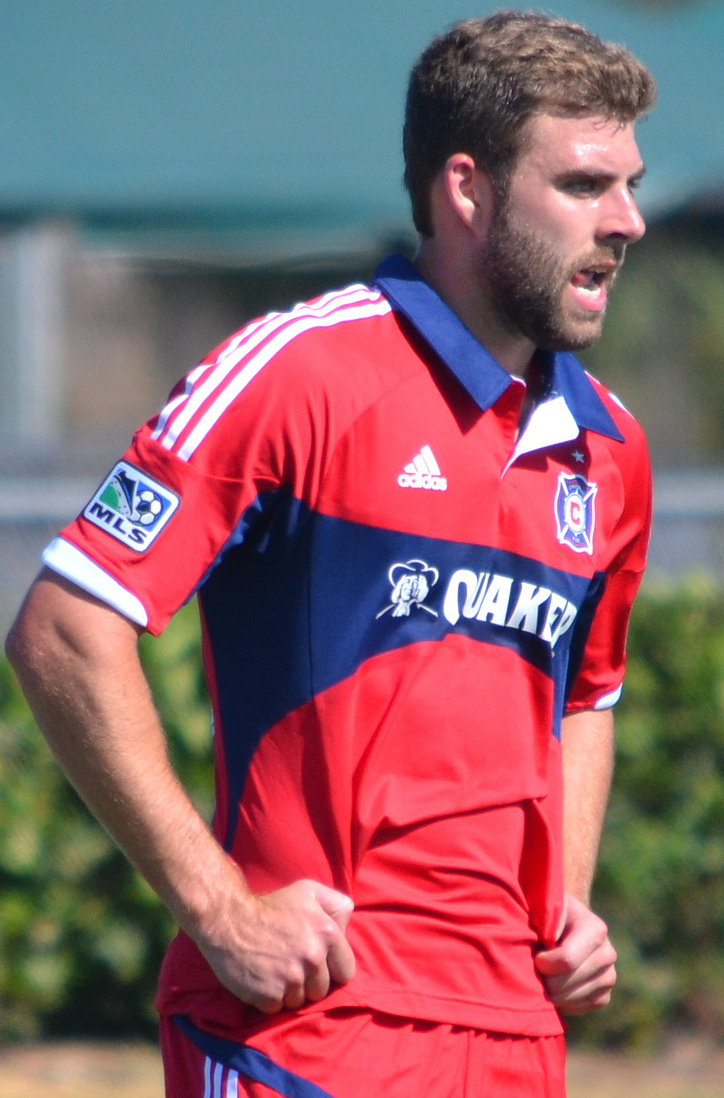
Elon's Steven Kinney has played for Carolina Dynamo and Chicago Fire

Elon's Steven Kinney was selected by the Chicago Fire with the 45th Overall Pick in the third round of the 2010 MLS SuperDraft. After graduating from Elon University in December 2009, he became Elon's first player to sign for an MLS club. Said Fire Technical Director Frank Klopas: "Steven Kinney has proven himself during the preseason to have the passion and talent we need on the pitch as we rebuild our defense [...] we're happy to have him now as part of the Fire family."

A native of Norcross, Georgia, Kinney started in 78 games for the Phoenix, and he was named first-team All-Southern Conference three times. During his four seasons at Elon, he anchored a defense that kept 28 clean sheets, including a school record 10 in 2009. Kinney was also the first Elon men's soccer player to earn Academic All-America status, being named to the ESPN The Magazine Academic All-America third team in November.

"I am truly blessed and honored to have this opportunity to continue my playing career," Kinney commented. "I have to give a large thanks to the Elon soccer family for helping me reach the goal of playing at this level."

In 2012, two more Phoenix Alumni signed MLS Contracts. 2010 Graduate Clint Irwin signed for the Colorado Rapids, and 2012 Graduate Gabe Latigue signed for the New England Revolution of the MLS in 2012.

== Individual awards and honors ==
=== All-time top scorers ===
#	Player	Tenure	Goals
1	Chris Thomas	2009–12	53
2	Mike Wessels	1985–88	43
3	Justin Wyatt	2006–09	31
4	Robert Latimer	1998–01	26
5	Paul Lawson	1983–84	25
5	Dave Myers	1991–93	25

=== All-Conferences ===
==== Carolina's ====
- 1973: Don Carlson, Peter Charles
- 1974: Don Carlson, Steve Moline, Don Ritter, Steve Rutledge, Robert Tucker
- 1975: Joe Curtis
- 1976: Greg Hamilon
- 1978: Kevin McCallie, Mike Curtis
- 1979: George Bakatsias, Kevin McCallie
- 1980: Kevin McCallie, Marash Nikaj, Jeff Sheilds
- 1981: Chip Calloway (Honorable Mention), Joe Chisolhm (HM), Kevin McCallie (HM), Jeff Sheilds
- 1982: Jeff Sheilds, Scott Spada
- 1983: Joe Bartlinski, Israel Hernandez, Paul Lawson, Andy Schaefer, Scott Spada
- 1984: Joe Bartlinski (HM), Paul Lawson, Joe Nepay, Andy Schaefer (HM), Anthony Sherwood (HM)
- 1985: Glen Gess, Joe Nepay, Andy Schaefer, Mike Wessels
- 1987: Glen Gees (2nd Team), Kip Rackley (2nd Team), Kevin Thomas (2nd Team), Mike Wessels (2nd Team)
- 1988: Marcus Ford (2nd Team), Glen Gess, R.T. Thomas, Mike Wessels

==== South Atlantic ====
- 1989: Jeff Cabot (2nd Team), Mike Crabtree (2nd Team), R.T. Myers (2nd Team), Marcus Ford (1st Team)
- 1990: Mike Crabtree (1st Team), Marcus Ford
- 1991: Mike Crabtree (1st Team), Dave Myers (2nd Team)
- 1992: Mike Crabtree, Dave Myers (2nd Team), Steve Roark (1st Team)
- 1993: Chad Lorentz (2nd Team), Dave Myers (1st Team)
- 1994: Bob Artioli (2nd Team)
- 1995: Bob Artioli (1st Team), Asi Johnson (2nd Team)

==== Big South ====
- 2000: Chad Heinicke (2nd Team), Jake Downs (2nd Team)
- 2001: Robert Latimer (2nd Team), Devin McCarron (2nd Team)
- 2002: Paul Bellachqua (2nd Team), Chad Heinicke

==== Southern ====
- 2003: Brent McDowell (2nd Team)
- 2004: Douglas Boateng (2nd Team), Junior Nombre (2nd Team)
- 2005: Junior Nombre (1st Team), Brett Paschall (2nd Team), Taylor Saxe (2nd Team), Kiki Willis (1st Team)
- 2006: Nick Aparicio (2nd Team), Junior Nombre (2nd Team), Taylor Saxe, Kiki Willis
- 2007: Clint Irwin (2nd Team), Steven Kinney (1st Team), Brett Paschall (1st Team), Justin Wyatt (1st Team)
- 2008: Kyle Boerner (1st Team), James Carroll (Freshman Team), Clint Collins (2nd Team), Erfan Imeni (1st Team), Clint Irwin (2nd Team), Steven Kinney (1st Team), Will Mason (2nd Team), Aaron Parker (2nd Team), Justin Wyatt (1st Team)
- 2009: Brad Franks (2nd Team), Clint Irwin (1st Team), Erfan Imeni (1st Team), Steven Kinney (1st Team), Chris Thomas (2nd Team/Freshman Team), Justin Wyatt (1st Team)
- 2010: Nick Butterly (Freshman Team), Brad Franks (1st Team), Clint Irwin (1st Team), Austen King (1st Team), Daniel Lovitz (Freshman Team), Chris Thomas (1st Team)
- 2011: Nick Millington (2nd Team), Austin Dunker (Freshman Team)
- 2012: Chris Thomas (1st Team), Matt Wescoe (2nd Team), Samuel McBride (Freshman Team), Miguel Salazar (Freshman Team)
- 2013: Nathan Dean (1st Team), Daniel Lovitz (1st Team), Jason Waterman (1st Team), James Brace (2nd Team), Nick Butterly (2nd Team), Austin Dunker (2nd Team), Matt Wescoe (2nd Team)

==== Colonial Athletic Association ====
- 2014: Miguel Salazar (1st Team), James Brace (2nd Team), Nathan Dean (2nd Team), Nathan Diehl (2nd Team), Jason Waterman (3rd Team), Jonathan Coleby (All-rookie Team)
- 2015: James Brace (1st Team), Nathan Diehl (1st Team), Miguel Salazar (1st Team), Eduardo Alvarez (1st Team), Sam McBride (1st Team), Jaiden Fortune (All-rookie Team), Matthew Jegier (All-rookie Team)
- 2016: Elijah Agu (1st Team), Nick Adamcyzk (2nd Team), Jonathan Coleby (3rd Team), Jaiden Fortune (3rd Team), Austin Hill (All-Rookie Team), Luke Matthews (All-Rookie Team), Tuki Tayali (All-Rookie Team)
- 2017: Matthew Jegier (1st Team), Luke Matthews (2nd Team), Elijah Agu (3rd Team), Jonathan Coleby (3rd Team), Ronnie Mleczkovicz (All-Rookie Team)
- 2018: Luke Matthews (1st Team), Iñigo Bronte (2nd Team), Jack Willbye (3rd Team)
- 2019: Luke Matthews (3rd Team), Tuki Tayali (3rd Team), Mattias Cooper (All-Rookie Team), Kasper Lehm (All-Rookie Team
- 2020: Jeppe Jordoson (2nd Team), Vermund Hole Vik (2nd Team), Mattias Cooper (3rd Team)
- 2021: Kasper Lehm (2nd Team), Jannik Videbaek (2nd Team), Jack Edwards (3rd Team), Calle Edelstam (All-Rookie Team), Scott Vatne (All-Rookie Team)
- 2022: Mason Duval (1st Team), Franc Gamiz Quer (1st Team), Vermund Hole Vik (1st Team), Scott Vatne (1st Team), Ryan Bilichuk (2nd Team), Kasper Lehm (2nd Team), Majaliwa Msabaha (3rd Team), Majaliwa Msabaha (All-Rookie Team)
- 2023: Scott Vatne (1st Team), Franc Gamiz Quer (3rd Team), Majaliwa Msabaha (3rd Team)

=== Coach of the Year ===
- 1979 – Steve Ballard (District)
- 1984 – Steve Ballard (Carolinas Conference and District)
- 2005 – Darren Powell (SoCon)
- 2008 – Darren Powell (SoCon)
- 2012 – Darren Powell (SoCon)
- 2013 – Darren Powell (SoCon)
- 2022 – Marc Reeves (CAA)

=== Player of the Year ===
- 1984 – Joe Nepay (CIAC)
- 1993 – Dave Myers (SAC)
- 2008 – Justin Wyatt (SoCon)
- 2010 – Chris Thomas (SoCon)
- 2012 – Chris Thomas (SoCon)
- 2013 – Daniel Lovitz (SoCon)

=== Freshman of the Year ===
- 1988 – Marcus Ford (CIAC)
- 1992 – Steve Roark (SAC)
- 1995 – Asi Johnson (SAC)
- 2005 – Kiki Willis (SoCon)
- 2009 – Chris Thomas (SoCon)

=== All-South Region ===
- 1983– Scott Spada
- 1985– Joe Nepay, Andy Scheafer
- 1986– Mike Wessels
- 1987– Mike Wessels
- 1988– Mike Wessels
- 1990– Marcus Ford
- 1991-Mike Crabtree
- 1992– Mike Crabtree, Dave Myers, Steve Roark
- 1993– Dave Myers (2nd Team)
- 1995– Asi Johnson (2nd Team)
- 2005– Taylor Saxe (3rd Team), Kiki Willis (2nd Team)
- 2007– Steven Kinney (2nd Team), Justin Wyatt (2nd Team)
- 2008– Erfan Imeni (3rd Team), Steven Kinney (2nd Team), Justin Wyatt (2nd Team)
- 2009– Clint Irwin (1st Team), Steven Kinney (2nd Team)
- 2010– Clint Irwin (2nd Team), Chris Thomas (1st Team)
- 2012– Chris Thomas (1st Team), Gabe Latigue (2nd Team), Daniel Lovitz (3rd Team)
- 2013– Daniel Lovitz (1st Team), Jason Waterman (2nd Team), Nathan Dean (3rd Team), Matt Wescoe (3rd Team)
- 2016– Elijah Agu (2nd Team)
- 2017– Jonathan Coleby (2nd Team), Matthew Jegier (2nd Team)
- 2018– Luke Matthews (3rd Team)
- 2021– Kasper Lehm (3rd Team)
- 2022– Ryan Bilichuk (1st Team), Franc Gamiz Quer (1st Team), Vermund Hole Vik (1st Team), Scott Vatne (1st Team), Mason Duval (3rd Team)
- 2023– Scott Vatne (2nd Team), Franc Gamiz Quer (3rd Team)

=== All-Americans ===
- 1983 – Scott Spada
- 1984 – Joe Nepay
- 1985 – Joe Nepay, Andy Schaefer
- 1988 – Glen Gess (HM)
- 1993 – Dave Myers (HM)
- 2012 – Chris Thomas (2nd Team)

=== NSCAA Scholar All-Americans ===
- 2008 – Steven Kinney (2nd Team)
- 2009 – Clint Irwin (2nd Team), Steven Kinney (2nd Team)
- 2010 – Clint Irwin (2nd Team)
- 2013 – Jason Waterman (2nd Team), Nathan Dean (3rd Team), Matt Wescoe (3rd Team)

== All-Time Results ==
Year	Coach	Overall	Conference	Conference Tournament	National Postseason
NAIA District 26/Area VII, Carolinas Conference (CIAC)
1972	Charles Harris	1–4	0–2 (CIAC)		
1973	Charles Harris	1–6–2	1-3-2 (CIAC)		
1974	Charles Harris	4–6–2	1-2-2 (CIAC)		
1975	Charles Harris	2–8	0–5 (CIAC)		
1976	Charles Harris	6-6	2–4 (CIAC)		
1977	Charles Harris	2–10	0–6 (CIAC)		
1978	Steve Ballard	2–11–1	0–6 (CIAC)		
1979	Steve Ballard	8–6–2	2-3-1 (CIAC)		NAIA District 26 Playoffs (1st Rd)
1980	Steve Ballard	8-8	6-1 (CIAC)		
1981	Steve Ballard	8–8–1	5-2 (CIAC)		District 26 Playoffs (1st Rd)
1982	Steve Ballard	6–7–3	4-1-2 (CIAC)		
1983	Steve Ballard	12–5–2	4-1-2 (CIAC)		District 26 (runner-up)
1984	Steve Ballard	11–7–1	5-1-1 (CIAC)		
1985	Steve Ballard	13–3–1	6-1-1 (CIAC)		District 26 (1st Rd)
1986	Steve Ballard	9–8–1	3-4-1 (CIAC)		
1987	Steve Ballard	16–3–1	6-1-1 (CIAC)		NAIA District 26 Champions, NAIA Area VII Tournament (1st Rd)
1988	Rob Brewer	14–4–2	4-2-2 (CIAC)		NAIA District 26 Champions, NAIA Area VII Tournament (2nd Rd)
NCAA Division II, South Atlantic Conference
1989	Rob Brewer	6–8–2	3-2-2 (SAC)		
1990	Rob Brewer	8–10–0	3-4-0 (SAC)	1-1	
1991	Rob Brewer	4–10–3	3-3-1 (SAC)	0–1	
1992	Rob Brewer	10–5–2	5-2 (SAC)	1-1	
1993	Rob Brewer	6–10–1	3–4 (SAC)	0–1	
1994	Rob Brewer	4–13	2–5 (SAC)	0–1	
1995	Rob Brewer	9–8	2–6 (SAC)	0–1	
1996	Mike Reilly	0–13–2	0-6-1 (SAC)	0–1	
NCAA Division Transition Years
1997	Mike Reilly	2–14–1			
1998	Mike Reilly	5–13–1			
NCAA Division I, Big South Conference
1999	Mike Reilly	3–14–0	0-7-0 (Big South)	0–1	
2000	Mike Reilly	10-10	3–4 (Big South)	2–1	
2001	Mike Reilly	8–12	3–4 (Big South)	0–1	
2002	Mike Reilly	7–13–1	2-4-1 (Big South)	0–1	
NCAA Division I, Southern Conference
2003	Mike Reilly	6–11–1	1-5-1 (SoCon)	0–1	
2004	Mike Reilly	4–11–5	1-5-1 (SoCon)	0–1	
2005	Darren Powell	9–9–2	4-2-1 (SoCon)	1-1	
2006	Darren Powell	10–8–2	3-3-1 (SoCon)	0–1	
2007	Darren Powell	8–7–4	4-3-0 (SoCon)	1-1	
2008	Darren Powell	10–9–1	7-0-0 SoCon Champions	1-1	
2009	Darren Powell	10–8–2	4-2-0 (SoCon)	1-1 (runner-up)	
2010	Darren Powell	8–6–5	4-2-1 (SoCon)	0–1	
2011	Darren Powell	9–11–2	2-5-0 (SoCon)	3-0 Tournament Champions	1st round NCAA Division I Tournament
2012	Darren Powell	15-5-2	5-2 SoCon Champions	3-0 Tournament Champions	1st round NCAA Division I Tournament
2013	Darren Powell	15-5-3	4-2-0 (SoCon)	3-0 Tournament Champions	2nd round NCAA Division I Tournament
NCAA Division I, Colonial Athletic Association
2014	Chris Little	9-6-4	4-2-2 (CAA)	CAA Quarterfinals	Did not qualify
2015	Chris Little	14-6-1	6-2-0 (CAA)	CAA Semifinals	2nd round NCAA Division I Tournament
2016	Chris Little	7-7-4	3-2-3 (CAA)	CAA Quarterfinals	Did not qualify
2017	Marc Reeves	7–5–6	3–2–3 (CAA)	CAA Quarterfinals	Did not qualify
2018	Marc Reeves	5–8–2	2–5–1 (CAA)	Did not qualify	Did not qualify
2019	Marc Reeves	7–9–1	2–6–0 (CAA)	Did not qualify	Did not qualify
2021 (Spring)	Marc Reeves	3–5–0	2–2–0 (CAA)		
2021	Marc Reeves	9–8–2	4–2–2 (CAA)	CAA Final	Did not qualify
2022	Marc Reeves	11–5–3	6–1–2 CAA Champions	CAA Final	1st round NCAA Division I Tournament
2023	Marc Reeves	6–8–4	3–3–2 (CAA)	CAA Semifinals	Did not qualify
2024	Marc Reeves	10–7–1	6–2–0 CAA Champions	CAA Semifinals	Did not qualify

== Titles ==
=== Conference ===
- SoCon regular season (2): 2008, 2012
- SoCon tournament (3): 2011, 2012, 2013
- CAA regular season (2): 2022, 2024
- CAA tournament (1): 2025
