= Maryland Terrapins men's soccer =

American college soccer team

- Founded: 1946; 80 years ago
- University: University of Maryland, College Park
- Head coach: Sasho Cirovski (32nd season)
- Conference: Big Ten
- Location: College Park, Maryland, US
- Stadium: Ludwig Field (capacity: 7,000)
- Nickname: Terrapins
- Colors: Red, white, black, and gold
Home	Away

Pre-tournament ISFA/ISFL championships
- 1947

NCAA tournament championships
- 1968, 2005, 2008, 2018

NCAA tournament runner-up
- 1960, 1962, 2013

NCAA tournament College Cup
- 1960, 1962, 1963, 1968, 1969, 1998, 2002, 2003, 2004, 2005, 2008, 2012, 2013, 2018

NCAA tournament Quarterfinals
- 1959, 1960, 1961, 1962, 1963, 1968, 1969, 1998, 2002, 2003, 2004, 2005, 2008, 2009, 2010, 2012, 2013, 2015, 2018, 2025

NCAA tournament appearances
- 1959, 1960, 1961, 1962, 1963, 1964, 1967, 1968, 1969, 1970, 1976, 1986, 1994, 1995, 1996, 1997, 1998, 1999, 2001, 2002, 2003, 2004, 2005, 2006, 2007, 2008, 2009, 2010, 2011, 2012, 2013, 2014, 2015, 2016, 2017, 2018, 2019, 2020, 2021, 2022, 2024, 2025, 2026

Conference tournament championships
- 1996, 2002, 2008, 2010, 2012, 2013, 2014, 2015, 2016

Conference regular season championships
- 1949, 1950, 1951, 1953, 1954, 1955, 1956, 1957, 1958, 1959, 1960, 1961, 1962, 1963, 1964, 1965, 1966, 1967, 1968, 1971, 2012, 2013, 2014, 2016, 2022, 2025

The Maryland Terrapins men's soccer team represents the University of Maryland in National Collegiate Athletic Association (NCAA) college soccer competition. The Terrapins compete in the Big Ten Conference and are coached by Sasho Cirovski.

The program has won four NCAA Division I College Cup national championships (1968, 2005, 2008, 2018). Maryland won nineteen Atlantic Coast Conference (ACC) regular season championships (1953–68, 1971, 2012, 2013) and six ACC tournament championships (1996, 2002, 2008, 2010, 2012, 2013) before joining the Big Ten Conference on July 1, 2014. The Terps won the 2014, 2016, 2022, and 2025 Big Ten Conference men's soccer championships and the 2014 and 2015 men's soccer tournament titles.

== History ==
Maryland fielded its first varsity soccer team in 1946. It was coached by Doyle Royal, who remained in that position through 1973.

In 1948, Royal led the Terrapins to an undefeated record, including an upset that ended Temple's 19-game winning streak. The only blemish on the season was a 4–4 draw against Loyola of Maryland, and the team had one of the strongest cases in the nation for the title of the mythical national championship. The NCAA did not sponsor a championship until 1959.

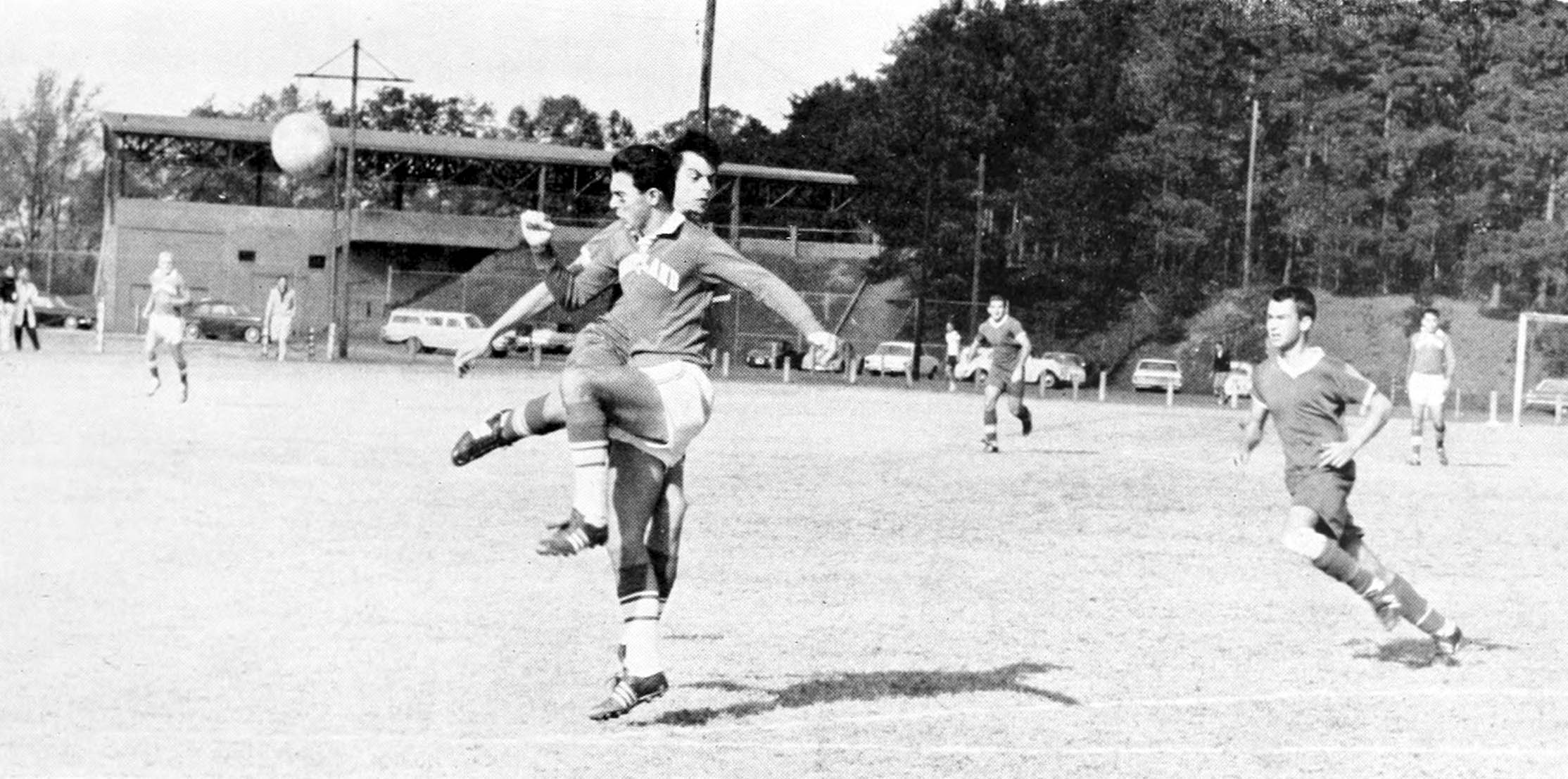
Maryland vs. Duke match in 1964

In 1968, Maryland defeated San Jose State, 4–3, to advance to the NCAA National Championship game. There, they tied Michigan State, 2–2, in order to take a share of their first national title. In 1974, Bud Beardmore, a future National Lacrosse Hall of Fame inductee, took over as men's soccer coach for one season. Sasho Cirovski was hired as head coach in 1993. He led the Terrapins to capture three more national championships in 2005, 2008, and 2018.

== Current roster ==
As of September 17, 2026

Note: Flags indicate national team as defined under FIFA eligibility rules; some limited exceptions apply. Players may hold more than one non-FIFA nationality.

No.	Pos.	Nation	Player
1	GK	DEN	Nikolaj Bertelsen
2	MF	USA	Luke Burdett
3	DF	FRA	Lilian Fichelle
4	MF	GHA	Jason Atakora
5	DF	AUT	Ljubomir Popovic
6	DF	GER	Leon Koehl
7	FW	CAN	Antoine Coupland
8	MF	USA	Albi Ndrenika
9	FW	USA	Rodrigo Neri
10	FW	UGA	Dominic Ayella
11	FW	PHI	Rocket Ritarita*
14	DF	GHA	Maxwell Sekyi
16	MF	USA	Zack Harris

No.	Pos.	Nation	Player
17	MF	USA	Kenny Quist-Therson
18	DF	USA	Jace Clark
19	FW	USA	Marco Wright
20	MF	USA	Casey Price
23	MF	CAN	Luka Juricic
25	FW	UGA	Dennis Kalanzi
27	MF	USA	Henry Bernstein
33	GK	USA	Zach Cielewich
38	GK	GER	Laurin Mack
50	GK	CAN	Alexander Milosevic
88	DF	GHA	Franklin Affanyi
90	DF	GER	Farouk Cisse
99	FW	PAN	Said El Eyssami

== Year-by-year record ==
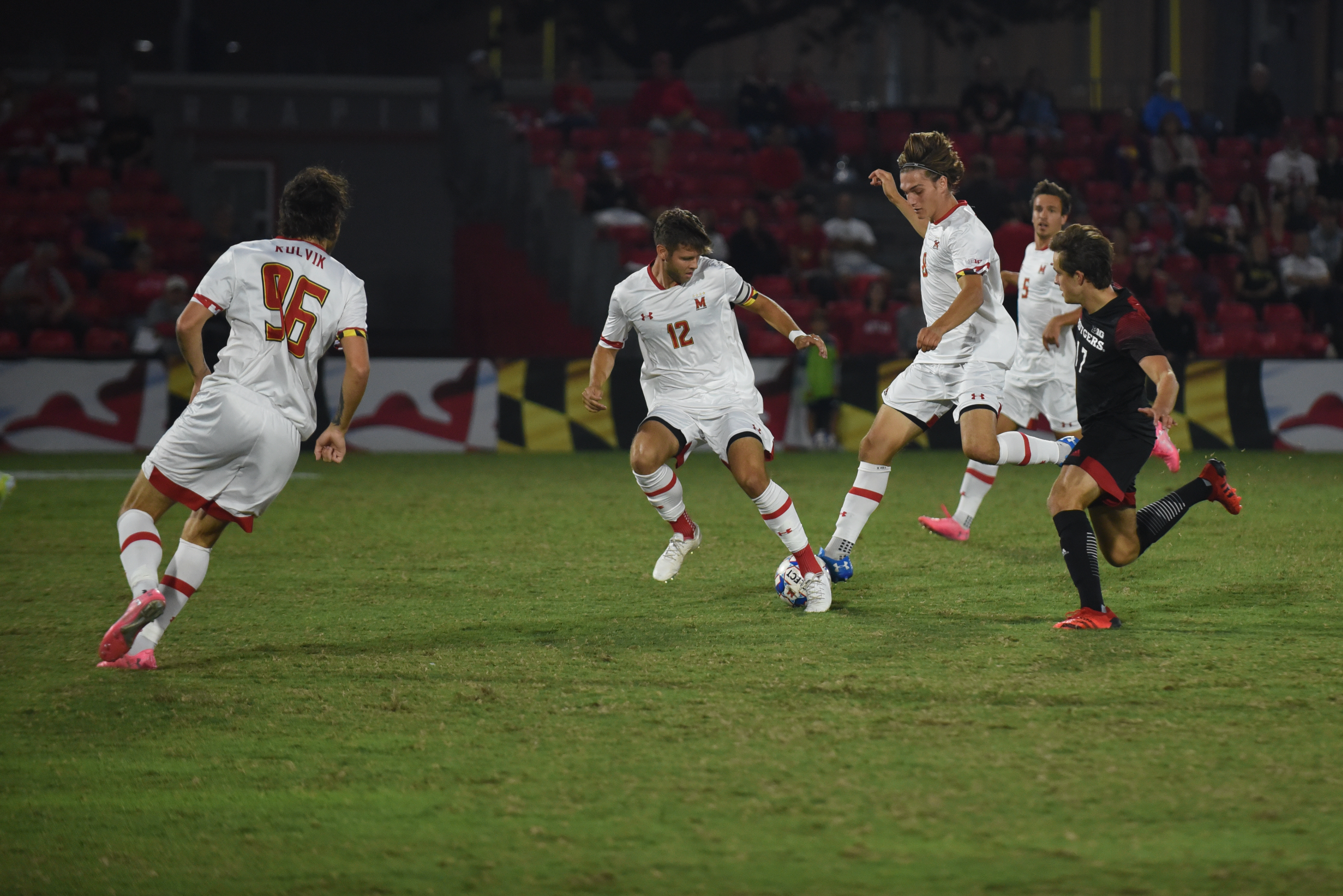
Maryland (in white) vs. Rutgers in September 2021

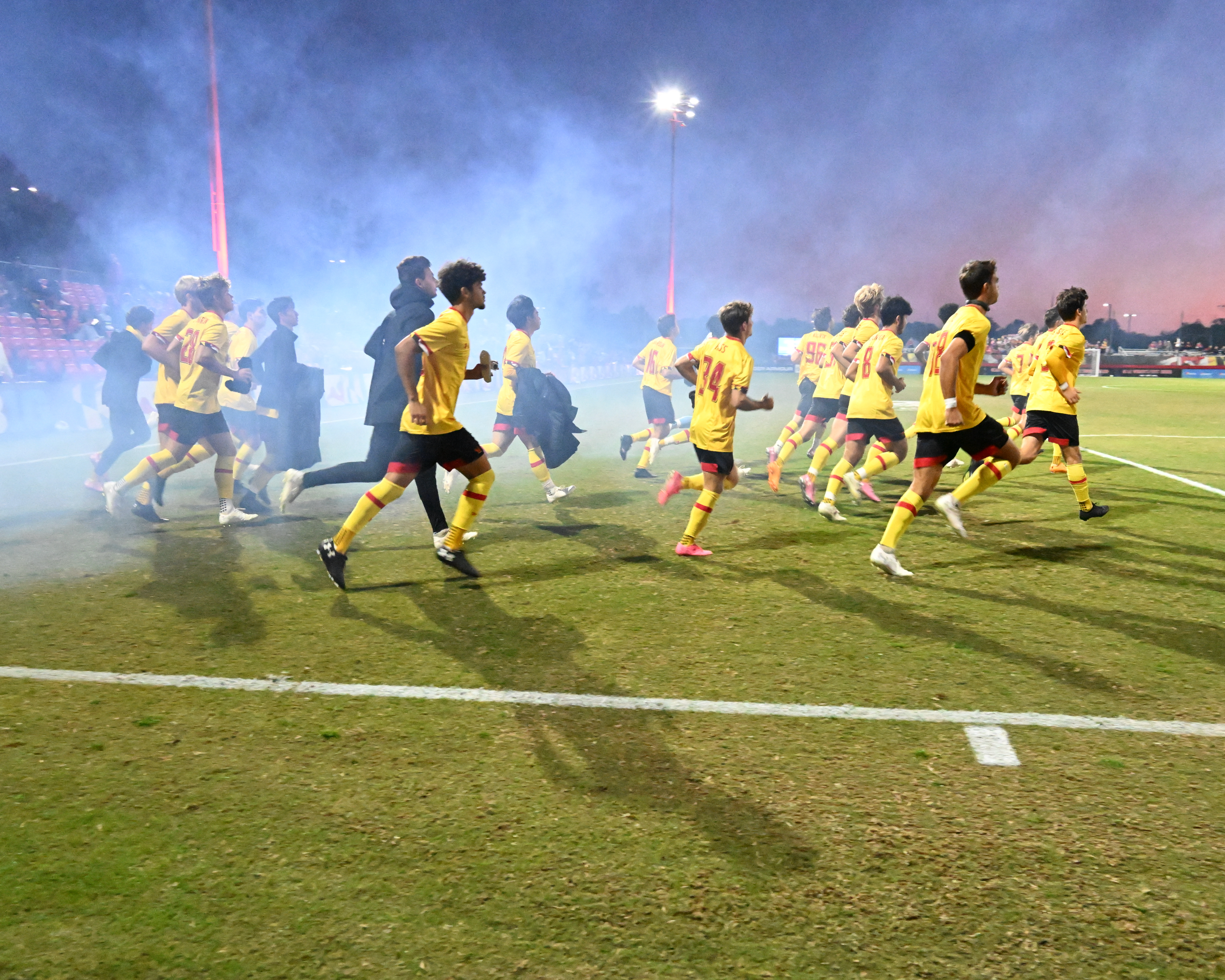
Maryland entering to the field to play vs. Michigan State in October 2022

Year	Head coach	Overall	Conference	Conference Tournament	NCAA Tournament	Seed
1946	Doyle Royal	2–1–0	—	—	—	—
1947	Doyle Royal	6–0–1	—	—	—	—
1948	Doyle Royal	6–3–1	1–1–1	—	—	—
1949	Doyle Royal	8–2–0	3–0–0	—	—	—
1950	Doyle Royal	8–2–0	4–0–0	—	—	—
1951	Doyle Royal	7–1–0	4–0–0	—	—	—
1952	Doyle Royal	7–1–1	3–0–1	—	—	—
1953	Doyle Royal	8–2–0	3–0–0	—	—	—
1954	Doyle Royal	5–4–2	3–0–1	—	—	—
1955	Doyle Royal	8–2–0	4–0–0	—	—	—
1956	Doyle Royal	9–2–0	4–0–0	—	—	—
1957	Doyle Royal	8–1–1	4–0–0	—	—	—
1958	Doyle Royal	9–0–1	4–0–0	—	—	—
1959	Doyle Royal	8–1–0	4–0–0	—	NCAA First Round	—
1960	Doyle Royal	9–2–1	4–0–0	—	NCAA Runner Up	—
1961	Doyle Royal	9–1–1	4–0–0	—	NCAA First Round	—
1962	Doyle Royal	10–1–0	4–0–0	—	NCAA Runner Up	—
1963	Doyle Royal	10–3–0	4–0–0	—	NCAA Semifinals	—
1964	Doyle Royal	8–3–0	4–0–0	—	NCAA First Round	—
1965	Doyle Royal	6–2–0	4–0–0	—	—	—
1966	Doyle Royal	6–3–1	3–1–0	—	—	—
1967	Doyle Royal	9–2–1	5–0–0	—	NCAA First Round	—
1968	Doyle Royal	14–0–1	5–0–0	—	NCAA Co-Champions	—
1969	Doyle Royal	11–2–2	3–1–1	—	NCAA Semifinals	—
1970	Doyle Royal	7–5–0	3–2–0	—	NCAA First Round	—
1971	Doyle Royal	7–4–1	4–1–0	—	NCAA First Round	—
1972	Doyle Royal	4–4–2	1–3–1	—	—	—
1973	Doyle Royal	8–4–1	3–1–1	—	NCAA First Round	—
1974	Bud Beardmore	5–3–5	3–1–1	—	—	—
1975	Jim Dietsch	6–5–1	2–3–0	—	—	—
1976	Jim Dietsch	7–4–2	2–1–2	—	NCAA First Round	—
1977	Jim Dietsch	9–5–0	3–2–0	—	—	—
1978	Jim Dietsch	5–7–2	1–4–0	—	—	—
1979	Jim Dietsch	5–12–0	0–5–0	—	—	—
1980	Joe Grimaldi	3–12–0	0–6–0	—	—	—
1981	Joe Grimaldi	5–7–4	0–5–1	—	—	—
1982	Joe Grimaldi	10–6–3	2–3–1	—	—	—
1983	Joe Grimaldi	5–9–3	1–4–1	—	—	—
1984	Joe Grimaldi	7–10–1	0–6–0	—	—	—
1985	Alan Shattuck	15–5–1	2–4–0	—	—	—
1986	Alan Shattuck	14–4–1	3–3–0	—	NCAA First Round	—
1987	Alan Shattuck	9–6–5	3–2–1	Semifinalists	—	—
1988	Alan Shattuck	8–7–4	2–4–0	Quarterfinalists	—	—
1989	Alan Shattuck	9–7–2	3–2–1	Semifinalists	—	—
1990	Alan Shattuck	10–8–1	3–3–0	Quarterfinalists	—	—
1991	Alan Shattuck	5–9–4	1–4–1	Quarterfinalists	—	—
1992	Alan Shattuck	5–12–0	0–5–0	Quarterfinalists	—	—
1993	Sasho Cirovski	3-14-1	1-5-0	—	—	—
1994	Sasho Cirovski	14-6-1	3-3-0	—	NCAA Second Round	—
1995	Sasho Cirovski	13-6-2	4-1-1	—	NCAA Second Round	—
1996	Sasho Cirovski	14-6-3	2-2-2	Champions	NCAA Second Round	—
1997	Sasho Cirovski	16-6-1	3-2-1	Finalists	NCAA Second Round	—
1998	Sasho Cirovski	16-8-0	3-3-0	Semi-finalists	NCAA Semi-finals	—
1999	Sasho Cirovski	14-6-1	4-2-0	Quarterfinalists	NCAA First Round	7
2000	Sasho Cirovski	10-9-0	1-5-0	First round	—	—
2001	Sasho Cirovski	11-9-1	1-4-1	Finalists	NCAA Second Round	—
2002	Sasho Cirovski	20-5-0	4-2-0	Champions	NCAA Semifinals	2
2003	Sasho Cirovski	20-3-1	5-1-0	Finalists	NCAA Semifinals	2
2004	Sasho Cirovski	17-6-2	4-2-1	Finalists	NCAA Semifinals	3
2005	Sasho Cirovski	19-4-2	7-1-0	Semifinalists	NCAA Champions	1
2006	Sasho Cirovski	16-5-1	4-3-1	Semifinalists	NCAA Third Round	5
2007	Sasho Cirovski	10-6-5	4-3-1	Quarterfinalists	NCAA Third Round	13
2008	Sasho Cirovski	23-3-0	6-2-0	Champions	NCAA Champions	2
2009	Sasho Cirovski	15-6-2	4-2-2	Quarterfinalists	NCAA Quarterfinals	—
2010	Sasho Cirovski	19-3-1	6-1-1	Champions	NCAA Quarterfinals	2
2011	Sasho Cirovski	14-4-3	4-2-2	Quarterfinalists	NCAA Third Round	5
2012	Sasho Cirovski	20-1-3	6-1-1	Champions	NCAA Semifinals	2
2013	Sasho Cirovski	16-3-5	7-1-3	Champions	NCAA Finals	5
2014	Sasho Cirovski	13-6-3	5-2-1	Champions	NCAA Second Round	4
2015	Sasho Cirovski	10-5-5	3-2-3	Champions	NCAA Quarterfinals	10
2016	Sasho Cirovski	18-1-2	7-0-1	Champions	NCAA Second Round	1
2017	Sasho Cirovski	10-5-4	5-1-2	Quarterfinalists	NCAA First Round	—
2018	Sasho Cirovski	13-6-4	4-4-0	Semifinalists	NCAA Champions	11
2019	Sasho Cirovski	11-8-2	3-3-2	Semifinalists	NCAA Second Round	—
2020	Sasho Cirovski	4-5-2	4-3-1	Semifinalists	NCAA Second Round	—
2021	Sasho Cirovski	12-4-2	5-2-1	Quarterfinalists	NCAA First Round	—
2022	Sasho Cirovski	11-4-5	4-0-4	Quarterfinalists	NCAA Second Round	—
2023	Sasho Cirovski	4-8-3	0-6-2	—	—	—
2024	Sasho Cirovski	9-6-3	5-3-2	First Round	NCAA Second Round	—
2025	Sasho Cirovski	13-1-4	8-0-2	Semifinalists	NCAA Quarterfinals	4

== Professional players ==
=== Ligue 1 ===
- Jacen Russell-Rowe (Toulouse FC) ^{*}

=== MLS ===
- Ben Bender (Philadelphia Union)
- Griffin Dillon (Real Salt Lake)
- Chris Rindov (LA Galaxy)
- Amar Sejdić (Columbus Crew)
- Dayne St. Clair (Inter Miami CF) ^{*}
- Kimani Stewart-Baynes (Colorado Rapids)
- Zack Steffen (Colorado Rapids) ^{*}
- Eryk Williamson (Charlotte FC) ^{*}

=== Austrian Bundesliga ===
- Donovan Pines (Grazer AK) ^{*}

=== Ligue 2 ===
- Mael Corboz (Grenoble Foot 38)

=== MLS Next Pro ===
- Luca Costabile (Toronto FC II)
- Omar Gonzalez (Chicago Fire FC II) ^{*} (coach-player)
- Colin Griffith (Portland Timbers 2) ^{*}
- Malcolm Johnston (Portland Timbers 2)

=== USL Championship ===
- Alex Crognale (San Antonio FC)
- Christiano François (Loudoun United FC) ^{*}
- Lasse Kelp (Pittsburgh Riverhounds SC)
- Sadam Masareka (Colorado Springs Switchbacks FC)

=== USL League One ===
- Joshua Bolma (Forward Madison)

=== Landesliga Bayern-Nordost ===
- Nick Richardson (TSV Nuremberg-Buch)

=== Former professional players ===
- Keith Beach
- Danny Califf ^{*}
- Judah Cooks
- Rich Costanzo
- Eli Crognale
- Leo Cullen ^{*}
- A. J. DeLaGarza ^{*}
- Michael Dellorusso
- Maurice Edu ^{*}
- Tsubasa Endoh
- Jeremy Hall ^{*}
- Jason Garey
- Chase Gasper ^{*}
- Clarence Goodson ^{*}
- Jason Herrick
- Sumed Ibrahim
- Taylor Kemp
- Stephen King
- Chris Lancos
- Alex Lee ^{*}
- Luca Levee ^{*}
- Zac MacMath
- Ivan Magalhães
- Domenic Mediate
- Patrick Mullins
- Chris Odoi-Atsem
- Robbie Rogers ^{*}
- Jake Rozhansky
- Philip Salyer
- Chris Seitz
- Abe Thompson
- Casey Townsend
- Taylor Twellman ^{*}
- Rodney Wallace ^{*}
- London Woodberry
- Drew Yates
- Graham Zusi ^{*}

^{*} – Player has represented their country at the senior national team level

== Honors ==
- NCAA Division I Championship
  - Winners (4): 1968, 2005, 2008, 2018
  - Runners-up (3): 1960, 1962, 2013
- Big Ten tournament
  - Winners (3): 2014, 2015, 2016
- Atlantic Coast Conference:
  - Winners (23): 1953, 1954, 1955, 1956, 1957, 1958, 1959, 1960, 1961, 1962, 1963, 1964, 1965, 1966, 1967, 1968, 1971, 1996, 2002, 2008, 2010, 2012, 2013

== See also ==
- Maryland–Virginia men's soccer rivalry
