= 2002 Colonial Athletic Association men's soccer season =

Colonial Athletic Association
- Season: 2009

2002 Colonial Athletic Association men's soccer standings
| | Conf. | | | | | Overall |
| Team | W | | L | | T | W | | L | | T |
|---|---|---|---|---|---|---|---|---|---|---|
| VCU ‡ | 7 | – | 1 | – | 1 | 15 | – | 4 | – | 2 |
| William & Mary + | 7 | – | 1 | – | 1 | 15 | – | 8 | – | 1 |
| Old Dominion | 6 | – | 2 | – | 1 | 10 | – | 9 | – | 1 |
| Towson | 4 | – | 4 | – | 1 | 10 | – | 8 | – | 2 |
| Drexel | 3 | – | 3 | – | 3 | 10 | – | 8 | – | 3 |
| James Madison | 3 | – | 3 | – | 3 | 8 | – | 10 | – | 2 |
| George Mason | 3 | – | 4 | – | 2 | 8 | – | 7 | – | 4 |
| Hofstra | 3 | – | 6 | – | 0 | 10 | – | 7 | – | 1 |
| UNC Wilmington | 2 | – | 7 | – | 0 | 9 | – | 9 | – | 0 |
| Delaware | 0 | – | 7 | – | 2 | 2 | – | 12 | – | 4 |
‡ – 2002 CAA Tournament champion + – Invited to the 2002 NCAA Division I Men's Soccer Championship; As of December 2002; Rankings from United Soccer Coaches

The 2002 Colonial Athletic Association men's soccer season was the 20th season of men's college soccer in the Colonial Athletic Association, played from August until November 2002.

== Results ==
2002 CAA men's soccer standings
| | Conference | | | | | | | | | Overall | | | | | | |
| | GP | W | L | T | GF | GA | GD | PTS | | GP | W | L | T | GF | GA | GD |
|---|---|---|---|---|---|---|---|---|---|---|---|---|---|---|---|---|
| VCU (RC) (TC) | 9 | 7 | 1 | 1 | 21 | 6 | +15 | 22 | | 21 | 15 | 5 | 1 | 44 | 20 | +24 |
| William & Mary | 9 | 7 | 1 | 1 | 21 | 8 | +13 | 22 | | 24 | 15 | 8 | 1 | 44 | 29 | +15 |
| Old Dominion | 9 | 6 | 2 | 1 | 16 | 9 | +7 | 19 | | 20 | 10 | 9 | 1 | 33 | 33 | 0 |
| James Madison | 11 | 8 | 3 | 0 | 17 | 12 | +5 | 24 | | 17 | 12 | 4 | 1 | 27 | 20 | +7 |
| Delaware* | 11 | 6 | 4 | 1 | 0 | 0 | 0 | 19 | | 17 | 11 | 5 | 2 | 11 | 6 | +5 |
| Northeastern | 11 | 6 | 4 | 1 | 0 | 0 | 0 | 19 | | 18 | 10 | 6 | 2 | 7 | 4 | +4 |
| Georgia State | 11 | 6 | 5 | 0 | 12 | 9 | +3 | 18 | ^{Note 1} | 19 | 12 | 6 | 1 | 26 | 14 | +12 |
| Drexel | 11 | 4 | 5 | 2 | 11 | 17 | −6 | 14 | | 18 | 5 | 10 | 3 | 14 | 24 | −10 |
| George Mason | 11 | 4 | 6 | 1 | 17 | 14 | +3 | 13 | | 18 | 7 | 8 | 3 | 37 | 27 | +10 |
| Hofstra | 11 | 4 | 7 | 0 | 18 | 23 | −5 | 12 | | 18 | 7 | 10 | 1 | 25 | 32 | −7 |
| UNC Wilmington | 11 | 2 | 8 | 1 | 12 | 16 | −4 | 7 | | 18 | 4 | 12 | 2 | 20 | 29 | −9 |
| Towson | 11 | 2 | 8 | 1 | 14 | 25 | −11 | 7 | | 17 | 3 | 11 | 2 | 20 | 41 | –21 |

Source: CAA
(RC) = Regular season champion; (TC) = Tournament champion
Only applicable when the season is not finished:
(Q) = Qualified for conference tournament, but not to particular round indicated; (E) = Eliminated from conference tournament

== See also ==
- Colonial Athletic Association
- CAA men's soccer tournament
- 2002 NCAA Division I men's soccer tournament
