= 2002 VCU Rams men's soccer team =

American college soccer season

2002 VCU Rams men's soccer

CAA Regular Season Champions CAA Tournament Champions

NCAA Tournament, Second Round
- Conference: Colonial Athletic Association
- Record: 15–4–2 (7–1–1 CAA)
- Head coach: Tim O'Sullivan (8th season)
- Home stadium: Sports Backers Stadium

2002 Colonial Athletic Association men's soccer standings
	Conf.					Overall
Team	W		L		T	W		L		T
VCU ‡	7	–	1	–	1	15	–	4	–	2
William & Mary +	7	–	1	–	1	15	–	8	–	1
Old Dominion	6	–	2	–	1	10	–	9	–	1
Towson	4	–	4	–	1	10	–	8	–	2
Drexel	3	–	3	–	3	10	–	8	–	3
James Madison	3	–	3	–	3	8	–	10	–	2
George Mason	3	–	4	–	2	8	–	7	–	4
Hofstra	3	–	6	–	0	10	–	7	–	1
UNC Wilmington	2	–	7	–	0	9	–	9	–	0
Delaware	0	–	7	–	2	2	–	12	–	4
‡ – 2002 CAA Tournament champion + – Invited to the 2002 NCAA Division I Men's Soccer Championship; As of December 2002; Rankings from United Soccer Coaches

The 2002 VCU Rams men's soccer team represented Virginia Commonwealth University in all 2002 NCAA Division I men's college soccer competitions.

== Team ==
=== Roster ===
As of June 8, 2011.

Note: Flags indicate national team as defined under FIFA eligibility rules; some limited exceptions apply. Players may hold more than one non-FIFA nationality.

No.	Pos.	Nation	Player
0	GK	USA	Steve Ankiel
1	GK	CRC	Saul Montero
3	DF	CRC	Gonzalo Segares
4	DF	ROU	Cristian Neagu
5	DF	YUG	Milorad Djordjevic
6	MF	USA	Cory Greiner
7	MF	USA	Matt Pauls
8	MF	LBR	McColm Cephas
9	MF	USA	Jose Umana
10	FW	USA	Carlos Garay
11	MF	ENG	Matthew Delicâte
12	FW	ROU	Petrut Bumbanac
13	MF	CRC	Randy Ugarte
14	MF	USA	Flavio Flores
15	MF	GUA	Hugo Osorio
17	MF	USA	Mike Aust

No.	Pos.	Nation	Player
17	FW	USA	Joe Barnd
18	MF	USA	Steven Duran
19	FW	USA	Scott Mitchell
20	FW	SLE	Mo Kamara
21	MF	USA	Caleb Konstanski
23	MF	ARG	Eliseo Fraga
24	MF	USA	Myles McGinley
25	MF	USA	Benjamin Iiames
26	DF	SEN	Moussa Diallo
28	FW	NGA	Kingsley Onwuka
29	MF	SCO	Conor Thomson
30	FW	ROU	Cristian Neagu
31	GK	USA	Calle Brown
—	GK	USA	William Herrmann
—	GK	SLE	John Trye

== Competitions ==
Key

Item	Description
W	Win
L	Loss
T	Tie
¤	Conference match
No. (##)	Opponent's ranking

=== Regular season ===
==== Games ====
Date	Opponent	Venue	Result	Attendance	Scorers	Conf.	Overall	Ref.	Notes
August 30, 2002	Syracuse	H	W 1–0	311	Delicâte	0–0–0	1–0–0		
September 1, 2002	Hartwick	H	W 4–0	423	Pauls, Delicâte, Segares, Neagu	0–0–0	2–0–0		
September 6, 2002	#1 Virginia	N	L 1–4	344	Cephas	0–0–0	2–1–0		Maryland Invitational
September 8, 2002	#6 Maryland	A	L 1–4	819	Neagu	0–0–0	2–2–0		Maryland Invitational
September 12, 2002	Howard	A	W 3–0	465	Bumbanac, Neagu, Gravely	0–0–0	3–2–0		VCU Tournament
September 14, 2002	Lehigh	H	W 2–1	300	Bumbanac, Garay	0–0–0	4–2–0		VCU Tournament
September 21, 2002	#18 American	A	L 2–4	507	Bumbanac, Pauls	0–0–0	4–3–0		
September 28, 2002	Richmond	H	W 2–0	522	Umana, Segares	0–0–0	5–3–0		
October 5, 2002	UNC Wilmington¤	H	W 4–1	217	Ugarte (2), Delicâte (2)	1–0–0	6–3–0		
October 12, 2002	#9 North Carolina	H	W 1–0	586	Segares	1–0–0	7–3–0		
October 18, 2002	Drexel¤	H	W 3–1	414	Delicâte, Ugarte, Aust	2–0–0	8–3–0		
October 20, 2002	Hofstra¤	H	W 3–0	341	Delicâte (2), Cephas	3–0–0	9–3–0		
October 25, 2002	George Mason¤	A	T 0–0	103	—	3–0–1	9–3–1		
October 27, 2002	James Madison¤	A	W 2–1	264	Delicâte (2)	4–0–1	10–3–1		
November 1, 2002	#21 Old Dominion¤	H	L 0–1	242	—	4–1–1	10–4–1		
November 2, 2002	#12 William & Mary¤	H	W 3–2	393	Cephas (2), Neagu	5–1–1	11–4–1		
November 8, 2002	Towson¤	A	W 3–0	150	Segares (2), Pauls	6–1–1	12–4–1		
November 10, 2002	Delaware¤	A	W 3–0	150	Delicâte, Cephas, Gravely	7–1–1	13–4–1		

Source: VCURams.VCU.edu

=== CAA Tournament ===
Date	Opponent	Venue	Result	Attendance	Scorers	Conf.	Overall	Ref.	Notes
November 15, 2002	Towson	N	W 4–0	150	Garay, Delicâte, Cephas, Ugarte	8–1–1	14–4–1		CAA Semifinals
November 17, 2002	#11 William & Mary	N	W 2–1	150	Delicâte, Djordjevic	9–1–1	15–4–1		CAA Championship

Source: VCURams.VCU.edu

=== NCAA Tournament ===
Date	Opponent	Venue	Result	Attendance	Scorers	Conf.	Overall	Ref.	Notes
November 27, 2002	#18 Furman	H	T 0–0 (L 2–4 pen.)	1,227	—	8–1–1	15–4–2^{[A]}		NCAA Second Round

== Statistics ==
=== Appearances and goals ===
Last updated on 7 November.

No.	Pos	Nat	Player	Total		Regular Season		CAA Tournament		NCAA Tournament	
No.	Pos	Nat	Player	Apps	Goals	Apps	Goals	Apps	Goals	Apps	Goals
0	GK	(United States) USA	Steve Anikel	0	0	0	0	0	0	0	0
1	DF	(United States) USA	Saul Montero	29	1	22	1	4	0	3	0
3	MF	(Costa Rica) CRC	Gonzalo Segares	14	0	10	0	1	0	3	0
4	FW	(Romania) ROU	Cristian Neagu	5	0	5	0	0	0	0	0
5	DF	(Federal Republic of Yugoslavia) YUG	Milorad Djordjevic	24	0	19	0	2	0	3	0
6	MF	(United States) USA	Cory Greiner	27	0	20	0	5	0	2	0
7	FW	(United States) USA	Matt Pauls	25	4	17	2	6	2	2	0
8	FW	(Liberia) LBR	McColm Cephas	28	9	22	5	6	4	0	0
11	MF	(Spain) ESP	Carlos Varela	5	0	5	0	0	0	0	0
12	DF	(United States) USA	Jed Zayner	16	0	14	0	2	0	0	0
13	FW	(United States) USA	Chris Pontius	20	3	17	3	3	0	0	0
14	MF	(Honduras) HON	Andy Najar	32	7	26	5	6	2	0	0
16	DF	(United States) USA	Jordan Graye	27	0	20	0	4	0	3	0
17	MF	(United States) USA	Conor Shanosky	0	0	0	0	0	0	0	0
18	DF	(United States) USA	Devon McTavish	25	0	19	0	3	0	3	0
19	MF	(United States) USA	Clyde Simms	26	1	20	0	6	1	0	0
20	MF	(United States) USA	Stephen King	24	0	19	0	2	0	3	0
21	MF	(Argentina) ARG	Pablo Hernández	16	1	14	0	2	1	0	0
22	DF	(Costa Rica) CRC	Rodney Wallace	16	0	12	0	4	0	0	0
23	GK	(United States) USA	Troy Perkins	28	0	22	0	3	0	3	0
24	MF	(United States) USA	Brandon Barklage	4	0	3	0	1	0	0	0
25	MF	(United States) USA	Santino Quaranta	36	3	27	2	6	1	3	0
27	MF	(Federal Republic of Yugoslavia) YUG	Branko Bošković	16	1	13	0	3	1	0	0
28	GK	(United States) USA	Bill Hamid	11	0	8	0	3	0	0	0
30	MF	(Brazil) BRA	Junior Carreiro	6	0	3	0	3	0	0	0
31	DF	(Guyana) GUY	J.P. Rodrigues	1	0	1	0	0	0	0	0
99	FW	(Bolivia) BOL	Jaime Moreno	28	9	21	4	4	1	3	4

== See also ==
- Virginia Commonwealth University
- VCU Rams
- VCU Rams men's soccer
- NCAA Division I Men's Soccer Championship
- CAA Men's Soccer Tournament
