= CAA men's soccer tournament =

- Conference soccer championship
- Sport: College soccer
- Conference: Coastal Athletic Association
- Number of teams: 6 of 11
- Format: Single-elimination
- Current stadium: Sentara Park
- Current location: Harrisonburg, Virginia
- Played: 1983–present
- Last contest: 2026
- Current champion: Charleston (1st title)
- Most championships: James Madison (8 titles)
- TV partner: FloSports
- Official website: caasports.com/msoc

The Coastal Athletic Association men's soccer tournament is the annual conference championship tournament for the Coastal Athletic Association (CAA). The tournament has been held every year since 1983, when the CAA began sponsoring a men's soccer program.

== Format ==
Presently, the Coastal Athletic Association Men's Soccer Tournaments features six conference teams that have the best conference regular season record. The regular season champion and runner-up receive byes to the semifinal round. The third through six-placed teams play in a play-in round at the site of the higher seed. The winners take on the top two seeds, which is hosted at the site of the team that wins the regular season. The champion earns an automatic berth into the NCAA Division I Men's Soccer Championship.

== Champions ==
The following is a list of Coastal Athletic Association tournament winners:

=== Finals ===
Key

- (1) – Title number
- a.e.t. – Match went to extra time
- p – Match decided by a penalty shootout after extra time
- – Winning team won regular season
- – Winning team won National Championship

=== Year by year ===
Ed.	Year	Champion	Score	Runner-up	Venue	City
1	1983	William & Mary (1)	4–3	George Mason	Zable Stadium	Williamsburg, VA
–	1984–89	(No tournament held during those years)				
2	1990	Richmond (1)	1–0	George Mason	City Stadium	Richmond, VA
3	1991	Old Dominion (1)	1–0	James Madison	City Stadium	Norfolk, VA
4	1992	James Madison (1)	2–1	William & Mary	City Stadium	Norfolk, VA
5	1993	James Madison (2)	3–0	Old Dominion	City Stadium	Richmond, VA
6	1994	James Madison (3)	3–1	William & Mary	City Stadium	Richmond, VA
7	1995	William & Mary (2)	1–0	George Mason	JMU Soccer Complex	Harrisonburg, VA
8	1996	William & Mary (3)	2–0	James Madison	Legion Field	Wilmington, NC
9	1997	VCU (1)	2–2 (9–8 p)	American	Virginia Beach Sportsplex	Virginia Beach, VA
10	1998	Richmond (2)	2–0	William & Mary	Virginia Beach Sportsplex	Virginia Beach, VA
11	1999	William & Mary (4)	4–2	VCU	Virginia Beach Sportsplex	Virginia Beach, VA
12	2000	William & Mary (5)	4–2	James Madison	Virginia Beach Sportsplex	Virginia Beach, VA
13	2001	James Madison (4)	1–0	VCU	Virginia Beach Sportsplex	Virginia Beach, VA
14	2002	VCU (2)	2–1	William & Mary	Virginia Beach Sportsplex	Virginia Beach, VA
15	2003	VCU (3)	2–0	George Mason	Sports Backers Stadium	Richmond, VA
16	2004	Hofstra (1)	1–0	Old Dominion	Sports Backers Stadium	Richmond, VA
17	2005	Hofstra (2)	1–0	Old Dominion	ODU Soccer Complex	Norfolk, VA
18	2006	Hofstra (3)	1–1 (3–2 p)	George Mason	Virginia Beach Sportsplex	Virginia Beach, VA
19	2007	Old Dominion (2)	0–0 (4–2 p)	Towson	Virginia Beach Sportsplex	Virginia Beach, VA
20	2008	George Mason (1)	1–0	Northeastern	Legion Field	Wilmington, NC
21	2009	UNC Wilmington (1)	1–0	Northeastern	Legion Field	Wilmington, NC
22	2010	William & Mary (6)	4–0	Hofstra	Albert–Daly Field	Williamsburg, VA
23	2011	Delaware (1)	2–1	Old Dominion	JMU Soccer Complex	Harrisonburg, VA
24	2012	Northeastern (1)	1–0 (a.e.t.)	Hofstra	Vidas Athletic Complex	Philadelphia, PA
25	2013	Drexel (1)	1–0	William & Mary	Vidas Athletic Complex	Philadelphia, PA
26	2014	James Madison (5)	1–0	Delaware	Grant Stadium	Neward, DE
27	2015	Hofstra (4)	2–0	Delaware	Hofstra Soccer Stadium	Hempstead, NY
28	2016	Delaware (2)	2–1	William & Mary	Hofstra Soccer Stadium	Hempstead, NY
29	2017	William & Mary (7)	4–2	UNC Wilmington	Sentara Park	Harrisonburg, VA
30	2018	James Madison (6)	1–1 (4–2 p)	Hofstra	Sentara Park	Harrisonburg, VA
31	2019	James Madison (7)	1–0 (a.e.t.)	UNC Wilmington	UNCW Soccer Stadium	Wilmington, NC
32	2020	James Madison (8)	0–0 (4–3 p)	Hofstra	Vidas Athletic Complex	Philadelphia, PA
33	2021	Hofstra (5)	3–2	Elon	Hofstra Soccer Stadium	Hempstead, NY
34	2022	Hofstra (6)	2–1	Elon	Rudd Field	Elon, NC
35	2023	Hofstra (7)	2–1 (a.e.t.)	Monmouth	Hofstra Soccer Stadium	Hempstead, NY
36	2024	Hofstra (8)	1–0	UNC Wilmington	Hofstra Soccer Stadium	Hempstead, NY
37	2025	Elon (1)	3–0	Stony Brook	Rudd Field	Elon, NC
38	2026	Charleston (1)	4–0	Hofstra	Hofstra Soccer Stadium	Hempstead, NY

== CAA Teams performance in the NCAA Tournament ==
Key

- F = Finals
- SF = College Cup
- QF = Quarterfinals
- R4 = Fourth round
- R3 = Third round
- R2 = Second round
- R1 = First round

Year	CAA Champion	Result	CAA At-large	Result
2002	VCU	R2		
2003	VCU	R3		
2004	Hofstra	R2	VCU	QF
2005	Hofstra	R1		
2006	Hofstra	R2		
2007	Old Dominion	R3		
2008	George Mason	R2		
2009	UNC Wilmington	R2		
2010	William & Mary	R3		
2011	Delaware	R2		
2012	Delaware	R2		
2013	Drexel	R1		
2014	James Madison	R1	UNC Wilmington	R2
2015	Hofstra	R2	Elon	R2
2016	Delaware	R1		
2017	William & Mary	R1	UNC Wilmington	R2
2018	James Madison	R3	UNC Wilmington	R1
2019	James Madison	R1		
2020	James Madison	R1		
2021	Hofstra	R3		
2022	Hofstra	R1	Elon	R1
2023	Hofstra	R3		
2024	Hofstra	R2		
2025	Elon	R1	Hofstra	R3
2026	Charleston	TBD		

== Titles by school ==
Teams in italics no longer play in the CAA.

School	Winner	Runner-up	Years won	Years runner-up
Hofstra	8	5	2004, 2005, 2006, 2015, 2021, 2022, 2023, 2024	2010, 2012, 2018, 2020, 2026
James Madison	8	3	1992, 1993, 1994, 2001, 2014, 2018, 2019, 2020	1991, 1996, 2000
William & Mary	7	6	1983, 1995, 1996, 1999, 2000, 2010, 2017	1992, 1994, 1998, 2002, 2013, 2016
VCU	3	2	1997, 2002, 2003	1999, 2001
Delaware	2	2	2011, 2016	2014, 2015
Old Dominion	2	4	1991, 2007	1993, 2004, 2005, 2011
Richmond	2	0	1990, 1998	
Elon	1	2	2025	2021, 2022
George Mason	1	5	2008	1983, 1990, 1995, 2003, 2006
Northeastern	1	2	2012	2008, 2009
Charleston	1	0	2026	
Drexel	1	0	2013	
Stony Brook	0	1		2025
Monmouth	0	1		2023
UNCW	0	1		2019

- Campbell has yet to appear in a tournament final. However, the 2023 season was Campbell's first in the CAA.

== See also ==
- Coastal Athletic Association
