= 2015 Delaware Fightin' Blue Hens men's soccer team =

American college soccer season

2015 Delaware Fightin' Blue Hens men's soccer
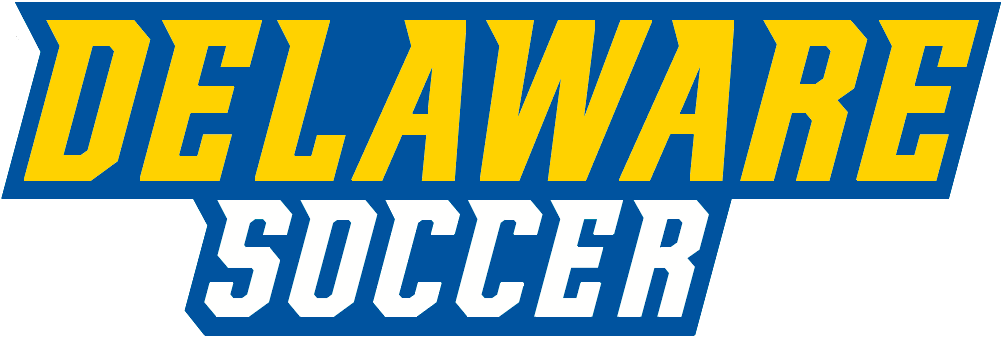
- Conference: Colonial Athletic Association
- Record: 10–7–4 (5–2–1 CAA)
- Head coach: Ian Hennessy (10th season)
- Assistant coaches: Jon Scheer (5th season); Matt Haney (8th season)
- Home stadium: Stuart and Suzanne Grant Stadium

2015 Colonial Athletic Association men's soccer standings
	Conf.					Overall
Team	W		L		T	W		L		T
Hofstra ‡	6	–	2	–	0	14	–	8	–	0
Elon +	6	–	2	–	0	14	–	6	–	1
Delaware	5	–	2	–	1	10	–	7	–	4
Charleston	4	–	3	–	1	7	–	8	–	2
UNC Wilmington	3	–	3	–	2	8	–	8	–	3
James Madison	3	–	3	–	2	5	–	10	–	4
William & Mary	2	–	6	–	0	7	–	8	–	2
Northeastern	2	–	6	–	0	3	–	12	–	2
Drexel	2	–	6	–	0	3	–	15	–	1
‡-Tournament champion +- Invited to the NCAA Division I Men's Soccer Championship; As of November 22, 2015; Rankings from NSCAA

== Schedule ==
Date Time, TV	Rank^{#}	Opponent^{#}	Result	Record	Site City, State
Preseason
08-16-2015*		Marist			Stuart and Suzanne Grant Stadium
08-22-2015*		at Monmouth			Hesse Field
Regular Season
08-28-2015*		Central Arkansas	W 1–0	1–0–0	Stuart and Suzanne Grant Stadium (1,231)
08-30-2015*		Fairfield	T 2–2 ^{2OT}	1–0–1	Stuart and Suzanne Grant Stadium (674)
09-05-2015*		at Villanova	L 1–2 ^{2OT}	1–1–1	Higgins Soccer Complex (478)
09-09-2015*		at Seton Hall	W 2–1	2–1–1	Owen T. Carroll Field (628)
09-13-2015*		Lehigh	W 3–2	3–1–1	Stuart and Suzanne Grant Stadium (630)
09-16-2015*		at Iona	L 0–3	3–2–1	Mazzella Field (194)
09-19-2015*		Columbia	L 0–1	3–3–1	Stuart and Suzanne Grant Stadium (1,374)
09-22-2015*		at Virginia Tech	L 1–4	3–4–1	Sandra D. Thompson Field (437)
09-26-2015		No. 8 Elon	L 0–1	3–5–1 (0–1–0)	Stuart and Suzanne Grant Stadium (854)
09-30-2015*		Temple	T 0–0 ^{2OT}	3–5–2	Stuart and Suzanne Grant Stadium (187)
10-07-2015		at College of Charleston	W 2–0	4–5–2 (1–1–0)	Patriots Point Soccer Complex (478)
10-10-2015		at Hofstra	L 0–1 ^{OT2}	4–6–2 (1–2–0)	Hofstra University Soccer Stadium (353)
10-14-2015		Drexel	W 5–1	5–6–2 (2–2–0)	Stuart and Suzanne Grant Stadium (221)
10-17-2015		at Northeastern	W 3–2	6–6–2 (3–2–0)	Parsons Field (225)
10-20-2015*		at No. 20 Maryland	W 2–1	7–6–2	Ludwig Field (1,439)
10-25-2015		UNC Wilmington	T 1–1 ^{2OT}	7–6–3 (3–2–1)	Stuart and Suzanne Grant Stadium (550)
10-28-2015		James Madison	W 4–0	8–6–3 (4–2–1)	Stuart and Suzanne Grant Stadium (162)
10-31-2015		at William & Mary	W 3–1	9–6–3 (5–2–1)	Albert-Daly Field (230)
CAA Tournament
11-07-2015		UNC Wilmington; Quarterfinal	W 3–1	10–6–3	Stuart and Suzanne Grant Stadium (1,125)
11-13-2015		vs. Elon; Semifinal	T 2–2 (5–4 PKs) ^{2OT}	10–6–4	Hofstra University Soccer Stadium (509)
11-15-2015		at Hofstra; Final	L 0–2	10–7–4	Hofstra University Soccer Stadium (528)
*Non-conference game. ^{#}Rankings from United Soccer Coaches. (#) Tournament seedings in parentheses.

== See also ==
- Delaware Fightin' Blue Hens men's soccer
- 2015 NCAA Division I men's soccer season
