= 2012 CAA men's soccer tournament =

Tournament details
- Country: United States
- Teams: 6

Final positions
- Champions: Northeastern
- Runner-up: Hofstra

The 2012 CAA men's soccer tournament, known as the 2012 Virginia 529 CAA Men's Soccer Championship for sponsorship reasons, is the 30th edition of the CAA Men's Soccer Tournament, which determines the conference's automatic berth into the 2012 NCAA Division I Men's Soccer Championship. The tournament will be played at Drexel University in Philadelphia on the Vidas Athletic Center.

The Delaware Fighting Blue Hens are the defending champions.

== Bracket ==
Play-in round
4	Hofstra	0 (5)
5	George Mason	0 (3)
3	James Madison	4
6	UNC Wilmington	3

Semifinals
1	Drexel	0 (3)
4	Hofstra	0 (4)
2	Northeastern	5
3	James Madison	0

Championship
4	Hofstra	0
2	Northeastern (2OT)	1

== Schedule ==
The higher seed, as well as the home team, is listed on the right.

=== Play-in round ===
November 5, 2012	UNC Wilmington	3–4 (a.e.t.)	James Madison	Harrisonburg, VA
19:00 EST	Bonner 7'; Sizemore 57', 86'; Parrish (yellow card) 67'; Mecham (yellow card) 82'	Report	Wyatt 23', 50' (yellow card) 90'; Grant 32'; Robins-Bailey 95'	Stadium: JMU Lacrosse/Soccer Complex; Attendance: 211; Referee: Bill Dittmar

November 5, 2012	George Mason	0–0 (a.e.t.) (3–5 p)	Hofstra	Hempstead, NY
19:00 EST		Report		Stadium: Hofstra University Soccer Stadium; Attendance: 226; Referee: Jim Memos
	Penalties
	Morgan (penalty missed); Andrews (penalty scored); Herrera (penalty scored); Roberts (penalty scored)		(penalty scored) Holland; (penalty scored) Annarumma; (penalty scored) Memic; (penalty scored) Biste; (penalty scored) Griebsch

=== Semifinals ===
November 9, 2012	James Madison	0–5	Northeastern	Philadelphia, PA
17:00 EST		Report	Alexander 10', 79'; Anding 21', 26'; Fayd 61'	Stadium: Vidas Athletic Complex; Attendance: 274; Referee: Thomas Brown

November 9, 2012	Hofstra	1–1 (a.e.t.) (4–3 p)	Drexel	Philadelphia, PA
19:30 ET	Griebsch (yellow card) 58'; Barea (yellow card) 61'; Memic 79'; Foster (yellow card) 102'	Report	Machado 26' (yellow card) 110'; Girard (yellow card) 64'; Bublil (yellow card) 74'; Miller (yellow card) 84'	Stadium: Vidas Athletic Complex; Attendance: 618; Referee: John McCloskey
	Penalties
	Holland (penalty scored); Annarumma (penalty scored); Memic (penalty missed); Biste (penalty missed); Griebsch (penalty scored); Barea (penalty scored)		(penalty scored) Pataia; (penalty scored) Grosh; (penalty scored) Tribbett; (penalty missed) Girard; (penalty missed) Bublil; (penalty missed) Pena

=== CAA Championship ===
November 11, 2012	Hofstra	0–1 (a.e.t.)	Northeastern	Philadelphia, PA
14:00 EST	Botte (yellow card) 5'; Sandtroen (yellow card) 74'	Report	Eckford (yellow card) 11'; Anding (yellow card) 28' 106'; Blum (yellow card) 78'	Stadium: Vidas Athletic Complex; Attendance: 252; Referee: Peter Dhima
