= 2015 CAA men's soccer tournament =

2015 Colonial Athletic Association men's soccer tournament
Tournament details
- Country: United States
- Teams: 6

Final positions
- Champions: Hofstra
- Runners-up: Delaware

Tournament statistics
- Matches played: 5
- Goals scored: 17 (3.4 per match)

The 2015 CAA Men's Soccer Tournament was the 33rd edition of the tournament. It determined the Colonial Athletic Association's automatic berth into the 2015 NCAA Division I Men's Soccer Championship.

The Hofstra Pride won the tournament, besting the Delaware Fightin' Blue Hens in the championship match.

== Qualification ==
2015 Colonial Athletic Association men's soccer standings
	Conf.					Overall
Team	W		L		T	W		L		T
Hofstra ‡	6	–	2	–	0	14	–	8	–	0
Elon +	6	–	2	–	0	14	–	6	–	1
Delaware	5	–	2	–	1	10	–	7	–	4
Charleston	4	–	3	–	1	7	–	8	–	2
UNC Wilmington	3	–	3	–	2	8	–	8	–	3
James Madison	3	–	3	–	2	5	–	10	–	4
William & Mary	2	–	6	–	0	7	–	8	–	2
Northeastern	2	–	6	–	0	3	–	12	–	2
Drexel	2	–	6	–	0	3	–	15	–	1
‡-Tournament champion +- Invited to the NCAA Division I Men's Soccer Championship; As of November 22, 2015; Rankings from NSCAA

The top six teams in the Colonial Athletic Association based on their conference regular season records qualified for the tournament.

== Bracket ==
Quarterfinals
4	Charleston	2
5	James Madison	3
3	Delaware	3
6	UNC Wilmington	1

Semifinals
1	Hofstra	2
5	James Madison	0
2	Elon	1 (4)
3	Delaware (pen.)	1 (5)

Championship
1	Hofstra	2
3	Delaware	0

== Schedule ==
=== Quarterfinals ===
November 7, 2015	Charleston	2–3	James Madison	Charleston, South Carolina
7:00 PM ET	Archer 75'; Jeausseran 85'	Report (CAA); Report (JMU)	Fouhy 14'; Ward-Baptiste 39'; Appleton 52'	Stadium: Patriots Point Soccer Stadium; Attendance: 557; Referee: Dustin Thorne

November 7, 2015	Delaware	3–1	UNC Wilmington	Newark, Delaware
7:00 PM ET	Delgado 14', 71'; Frost 57'	Report	Smith 36'	Stadium: Delaware Mini Stadium; Attendance: 1,125; Referee: Jason Blight

=== Semifinals ===
November 13, 2015	Elon	2–2 (a.e.t.) (4–5 p)	Delaware	Hempstead, New York
4:45 PM ET	Schroeder 62' (o.g.); Alvarez 87'	Report	Dipre 9'; Sampson 54'	Stadium: Hofstra Soccer Stadium; Attendance: 509; Referee: Mike Stutt
	Penalties
	Alvarez (penalty scored); Vandermaas-Peeler (penalty missed); Brace (penalty missed); McBride (penalty scored); Salazar (penalty scored); Beresford (penalty scored); Agu (penalty missed)		(penalty scored) Laguna; (penalty missed) Sampson; (penalty scored) Dipre; (penalty missed) Siverio; (penalty scored) Philippe; (penalty scored) de Villardi; (penalty scored) Gillin

November 13, 2015	Hofstra	2–0	James Madison	Hempstead, New York
7:45 PM ET	Walcott 28'; Holland 61'	Report		Stadium: Hofstra Soccer Stadium; Attendance: 509; Referee: Nabil Alsaidi

=== Championship ===
November 15, 2015	Hofstra	2–0	Delaware	Hempstead, New York
2:30 PM ET	Alfonso 26'; Holland 45'	Report		Stadium: Hofstra Soccer Stadium; Attendance: 528; Referee: Bill Dittmar

== Statistical leaders ==
=== Top goalscorers ===
Rank	Player	College	Goals

As of 15 November 2015

== See also ==
- Colonial Athletic Association
- 2015 Colonial Athletic Association men's soccer season
- 2015 NCAA Division I men's soccer season
- 2015 NCAA Division I Men's Soccer Championship
