= 1998 VCU Rams men's soccer team =

American college soccer season

1998 VCU Rams men's soccer

CAA Regular Season Champions

NCAA Tournament, First Round, L 1–2 vs. South Carolina
- Conference: Colonial Athletic Association
- Record: 12–6–3 (7–0–1 CAA)
- Head coach: Tim Sullivan (4th season)
- Home stadium: Cary Street Field

The 1998 VCU Rams men's soccer team represented Virginia Commonwealth University during the 1998 NCAA Division I men's soccer season. The Rams played in the Colonial Athletic Association for their fourth. It was the program's 21st season fielding a men's varsity college soccer program.

The Rams entered the season as the defending CAA Men's Soccer Tournament champions. The Rams were able to win the conference regular season title, before falling in the CAA Semifinals to Richmond. The Rams earned an at-large berth into the NCAA Tournament, where they fell in overtime to South Carolina.

== Roster ==
- Kevin Jeffrey
- Ricardo Capilla
- Trevor Spencer
- Matt Kirkpatrick
- Dwayne Bergeron
- Roberto Gutierrez
- Andy Kish
- Lorenz Baumgartner
- Erwan LeCrom
- Kofi Sey
- Jose Maldanado
- Dominic Amato
- Gilberto Bejarano
- Guillermo Henriques
- Brian James
- Khomeini Talbot
- Adam Mead

== Schedule ==
| Date Time, TV | Rank^{#} | Opponent^{#} | Result | Record | Site (Attendance) City, State |
Preseason
Regular season
| 09-04-1998* | | vs. Vanderbilt | L 1–2 ^{2OT} | 0–1 | Unknown (100) |
| 09-06-1998* | | vs. Northeastern | W 2–1 ^{OT} | 1–1 | Unknown (200) |
| 09-12-1998* | | vs. Jacksonville; Wofford Tournament | L 3–4 | 1–2 | Snyder Field (37); Spartanburg, SC |
| 09-13-1998* | | at Wofford; Wofford Tournament | T 1–1 ^{2OT} | 1–2–1 | Snyder Field (92); Spartanburg, SC |
| 09-19-1998* | | Loyola | W 1–0 | 2–2–1 | Cary Street Field (141); Richmond, VA |
| 09-20-1998* | | Penn State | L 0–1 | 2–3–1 | Cary Street Field (128); Richmond, VA |
| 09-27-1998 | | American | W 4–2 | 3–3–1 (1–0) | Cary Street Field (156); Richmond, VA |
| 09-29-1998 | | at Richmond; Capital City Classic | W 2–1 ^{OT} | 4–3–1 (2–0) | City Stadium (687); Richmond, VA |
| 10-03-1998* | | South Carolina | W 2–1 ^{2OT} | 5–3–1 | Cary Street Field (151); Richmond, VA |
| 10-07-1998 | | UNC Wilmington | W 2–1 ^{OT} | 6–3–1 (3–0) | Cary Street Field (121); Richmond, VA |
| 10-10-1998 | | UNC Wilmington | W 2–1 ^{OT} | 6–3–1 (3–0) | ODU Soccer Complex (121); Norfolk, VA |
*Non-conference game. ^{#}Rankings from United Soccer Coaches. (#) Tournament seedings in parentheses.

== Statistics ==
Below are player statistics.

=== Goalkeeper statistics ===
| No. | Player | App. | | Goal Average | | | Saves | | Record | | | Shutouts |
| No. | Player | GP | GS | Min. | GA | GA | Saves | Save Pct. | W | L | T | Shutouts |
|---|---|---|---|---|---|---|---|---|---|---|---|---|
| 0 | Jack van Arsdale | 5 | 4 | 425:00 | 8 | 1.69 | 18 | .692 | 0 | 4 | 1 | 0 |
| 1 | Gabriel Rodriguez | 12 | 12 | 1014:56 | 16 | 1.42 | 46 | .742 | 4 | 6 | 1 | 2 |
| 21 | Andrew Wells | 3 | 1 | 155:00 | 3 | 1.74 | 4 | .571 | 1 | 0 | 0 | 2 |
| TOTALS | | 17 | | 1594:56 | 27 | 1.52 | 70 | .722 | 5 | 10 | 2 | 5 |
