= 1997 VCU Rams men's soccer team =

American college soccer season

1997 VCU Rams men's soccer

CAA Tournament Champions Hoya Classic Champions Sheraton Invitational Co-Champions Hartwick Invitational Champions

NCAA Tournament, First Round, L 0–1 vs. Georgetown
- Conference: Colonial Athletic Association
- Record: 15–4–4 (4–2–2 CAA)
- Head coach: Tim Sullivan (3rd season)
- Home stadium: Cary Street Field

1997 CAA men's soccer standings
	Conf.					Overall
Team	W		L		T	W		L		T
No. 7 American +	6	–	0	–	2	17	–	4	–	4
George Mason	5	–	2	–	1	12	–	8	–	2
No. 21 VCU ‡	4	–	2	–	2	15	–	4	–	4
William & Mary	4	–	2	–	2	14	–	6	–	2
Richmond	4	–	3	–	1	9	–	7	–	4
James Madison	3	–	3	–	2	12	–	5	–	2
Old Dominion	3	–	5	–	0	7	–	9	–	1
East Carolina	2	–	6	–	0	7	–	13	–	0
UNCW	0	–	8	–	0	6	–	14	–	0
‡- 1997 CAA Tournament +- Invited to the NCAA Division I Men's Soccer Championship; As of 1 December 1997; Rankings from NSCAA

The 1997 VCU Rams men's soccer team represented Virginia Commonwealth University during the 1997 NCAA Division I men's soccer season. The Rams played in the Colonial Athletic Association for their third season. It was the program's 20th season fielding a men's varsity college soccer program.

The 1997 season was the first season that the VCU Rams earned a berth into the NCAA Division I Men's Soccer Tournament, by the virtue of winning the CAA Men's Soccer Tournament. VCU played Georgetown in the first round of the tournament, losing the match.

== Schedule ==
Date Time, TV	Rank^{#}	Opponent^{#}	Result	Record	Site (Attendance) City, State
Regular season
08-30-1997*		at Georgetown; Hoya Classic	W 1–0	1–0	Yates Field; Washington, DC
09-01-1997*		vs. George Washington; Hoya Classic	W 2–1	2–0	Yates Field; Washington, DC
09-06-1997*		vs. Hartford; Sheraton Invitational	W 3–0	3–0	Mauck Stadium; Harrisonburg, VA
09-07-1997*		vs. Wright State; Sheraton Invitational	W 4–3	4–0	Mauck Stadium; Harrisonburg, VA
09-12-1997*	No. 24	at Radford	W 2–0	5–0	New River Soccer Complex; Radford, VA
09-20-1997*	No. 21	at Loyola (MD)	W 4–1	6–0	Geppi-Aikens Field; Baltimore, MD
09-24-1997*	No. 18	at No. 6 Virginia	L 1–2	6–1	Klöckner Stadium; Charlottesville, VA
09-27-1997	No. 18	at No. 17 American	T 0–0 ^{2OT}	6–1–1 (0–0–1)	Reeves Field; Washington, DC
09-30-1997	No. 23	Richmond; Capital City Classic	W 1–0	7–1–1 (1–0–1)	Cary Street Field; Richmond, VA
10-04-1997*	No. 23	vs. Lafayette; Hartwick Invitational	W 2–0	8–1–1	Elmore Field; Hartwick, NY
10-05-1997*	No. 23	vs. Penn; Hartwick Invitational	W 3–2	9–1–1	Elmore Field; Hartwick, NY
10-08-1997*	No. 15	Howard	T 1–1 ^{2OT}	9–1–2	Cary Street Field; Richmond, VA
10-15-1997	No. 19	at No. 25 James Madison	L 1–2	9–2–2 (1–1–1)	Mauck Stadium; Harrisonburg, VA
10-18-1997	No. 19	at Old Dominion; Rivalry	W 1–0	10–2–2 (2–1–1)	Cary Street Field; Richmond, VA
10-20-1997*	No. 24	Liberty	W 1–0	11–2–2	Cary Street Field; Richmond, VA
10-25-1997	No. 24	at UNCW	W 4–0	12–2–2 (3–1–1)	Legion Field; Wilmington, NC
10-29-1997	No. 22	William & Mary	T 1–1 ^{2OT}	12–2–3 (3–1–2)	Cary Street Field; Richmond, VA
11-01-1997	No. 22	at George Mason; Rivalry	L 0–5	12–3–3 (3–2–2)	George Mason Stadium; Fairfax, VA
11-08-1997		East Carolina	W 2–1	13–3–3 (4–2–2)	Cary Street Field; Richmond, VA
CAA Tournament
11-12-1997	No. 25 (3)	No. (6) James Madison; Quarterfinal	W 1–0	14–3–3	Cary Street Field; Richmond, VA
11-14-1997	No. 25 (3)	vs. No. (2) George Mason; Semifinal	W 2–0	15–3–3	Reeves Field; Washington, DC
11-16-1997	No. 25 (3)	vs. No. 5 (1) American; Final	T 2–2 ^{4OT} W 9–8 PK	15–3–4	Reeves Field; Washington, DC
NCAA Tournament
11-12-1997	No. 14	Georgetown; Quarterfinal	L 0–1	15–4–4	Cary Street Field; Richmond, VA
*Non-conference game. ^{#}Rankings from United Soccer Coaches. (#) Tournament seedings in parentheses.
