= 2016 Colonial Athletic Association men's soccer season =

- League: NCAA Division I
- Sport: Soccer
- Duration: August, 2016 – November, 2016
- Teams: 9

2017 MLS SuperDraft
- Top draft pick: Joe Holland, Hofstra
- Picked by: Houston Dynamo, 10th overall

Regular season
- Season champions: Hofstra

Tournament
- Champions: Delaware

Colonial Athletic Association men's soccer seasons
- ← 2015 2017 →

2016 Colonial Athletic Association men's soccer standings
	Conf.					Overall
Team	W		L		T	W		L		T
Hofstra	7	–	1	–	0	9	–	8	–	1
Delaware ‡	5	–	3	–	0	11	–	8	–	1
UNC Wilmington	3	–	2	–	3	8	–	6	–	3
Elon	3	–	2	–	3	7	–	7	–	4
William & Mary	3	–	3	–	2	13	–	7	–	2
Charleston	3	–	3	–	2	6	–	9	–	3
James Madison	3	–	3	–	2	5	–	9	–	3
Northeastern	3	–	5	–	0	6	–	11	–	0
Drexel	0	–	8	–	0	1	–	14	–	2
‡-Tournament champion +- Invited to the 2016 NCAA Division I Men's Soccer Championship; As of 18 November 2016; Rankings from NSCAA

The 2016 Colonial Athletic Association men's soccer season was the 34th season of men's varsity soccer in the conference.

Hofstra Pride are the defending regular season and tournament champions.

== Teams ==
=== Stadia and locations ===
Team	Location	Stadium	Capacity
Charleston Cougars	Charleston, South Carolina	Patriots Point Soccer Stadium	2,200
Delaware Fighting Blue Hens	Newark, Delaware	Delaware Mini Stadium	1,500
Drexel Dragons	Philadelphia, Pennsylvania	Vidas Field	2,750
Elon Phoenix	Elon, North Carolina	Rudd Field	2,000
Hofstra Pride	Hempstead, New York	Hofstra Soccer Stadium	2,000
James Madison Dukes	Harrisonburg, Virginia	University Park	1,500
Northeastern Huskies	Boston, Massachusetts	Parsons Field	7,000
UNC Wilmington Seahawks	Wilmington, North Carolina	UNCW Soccer Stadium	1,000
William & Mary Tribe	Williamsburg, Virginia	Albert-Daly Field	2,271

- Towson does not sponsor men's soccer

== Regular season ==
=== Rankings ===
Legend
Increase in ranking
Decrease in ranking
Not ranked previous week

		Pre	Wk 1	Wk 2	Wk 3	Wk 4	Wk 5	Wk 6	Wk 7	Wk 8	Wk 9	Wk 10	Wk 11	Wk 12	Final
Charleston	C														
Delaware	C		RV	22	RV	RV	RV	RV	NR						
Drexel	C														
Elon	C	RV	NR	RV	RV	RV	NR								
Hofstra	C	RV	RV	NR					RV	RV	RV	NR			
James Madison	C														
Northeastern	C														
UNC Wilmington	C				RV	NR	24	20	RV	RV	NR				
William & Mary	C				RV	RV	NR	RV	NR						

== Postseason ==
=== CAA tournament ===
Semifinals
1	Hofstra	1
5	William & Mary	3
2	Delaware	2
6	Charleston	1

Final
5	William & Mary	1
2	Delaware	2

=== NCAA tournament ===
Seed	Region	School	1st round	2nd round	3rd round	Quarterfinals	Semifinals	Championship
—	1	Delaware	L, 0–2 vs. Providence – (Providence)					

== All-CAA awards and teams ==
2016 CAA Men's Soccer Individual Awards
Award	Recipient(s)
Player of the Year	
Coach of the Year	
Defensive Player of the Year	
Rookie of the Year	

2016 CAA Men's Soccer All-Conference Teams
First Team	Second Team	Rookie Team

== See also ==
- 2016 NCAA Division I men's soccer season
- 2016 CAA Men's Soccer Tournament
- 2016 Colonial Athletic Association women's soccer season
