= 2016 CAA men's soccer tournament =

- Classification: Division I
- Teams: 6
- Matches: 5
- Site: Hofstra University Soccer Stadium; Hempstead, New York
- Champions: Delaware (2nd title)
- Winning coach: Ian Hennessy (2nd title)

2016 Colonial Athletic Association men's soccer standings
	Conf.					Overall
Team	W		L		T	W		L		T
Hofstra	7	–	1	–	0	9	–	8	–	1
Delaware ‡	5	–	3	–	0	11	–	8	–	1
UNC Wilmington	3	–	2	–	3	8	–	6	–	3
Elon	3	–	2	–	3	7	–	7	–	4
William & Mary	3	–	3	–	2	13	–	7	–	2
Charleston	3	–	3	–	2	6	–	9	–	3
James Madison	3	–	3	–	2	5	–	9	–	3
Northeastern	3	–	5	–	0	6	–	11	–	0
Drexel	0	–	8	–	0	1	–	14	–	2 -
‡-Tournament champion +- Invited to the 2016 NCAA Division I Men's Soccer Championship; As of 18 November 2016; Rankings from NSCAA

The 2016 CAA men's soccer tournament, was the 34th edition of the tournament. It determined the Colonial Athletic Association's automatic berth into the 2016 NCAA Division I Men's Soccer Championship.

The Delaware Fightin' Blue Hens won the CAA title, making it their second CAA championship. The Hens defeated the William & Mary Tribe in the championship, 2–1.

== Seeding ==
The top six programs qualified for the CAA Tournament. The top two seeds, being the regular season champion and runner-up earned a bye to the semifinals of the tournament.

No.	School	W	L	T	PCT.	Pts.
1	Hofstra	7	1	0	.875	21
2	Delaware	5	3	0	.625	15
3	UNCW	3	2	3	.563	12
4	Elon	3	2	3	.563	12
5	William & Mary	3	3	2	.500	11
6	Charleston	3	3	2	.500	11

== Bracket ==
Quarterfinals; Saturday, November 5
4	Elon	0
5	William & Mary	1
3	UNCW	1
6	Charleston	2

Semifinals; Friday, November 11
1	Hofstra	1
5	William & Mary	3
2	Delaware	2
6	Charleston	1

Final; Sunday, November 13
5	William & Mary	1
2	Delaware	2
