= 2004 VCU Rams men's soccer team =

American college soccer season

2004 VCU Rams men's soccer

CAA Regular Season Champions

NCAA Tournament, Quarterfinals
- Conference: Colonial Athletic Association
- U. Soc. Coaches poll: No. 7
- TopDrawerSoccer.com: No. 8
- Record: 12–6–2 (7–2–1 CAA)
- Head coach: Tim O'Sullivan (9th season)
- Home stadium: Sports Backers Stadium

2004 Colonial Athletic Association men's soccer standings
| | Conf. | | | | | Overall |
| Team | W | | L | | T | W | | L | | T |
|---|---|---|---|---|---|---|---|---|---|---|
| No. 7 VCU ‡ | 7 | – | 1 | – | 1 | 12 | – | 6 | – | 3 |
| James Madison + | 7 | – | 2 | – | 0 | 15 | – | 3 | – | 1 |
| No. 21 Old Dominion + | 6 | – | 2 | – | 1 | 13 | – | 6 | – | 2 |
| UNCW | 5 | – | 3 | – | 1 | 12 | – | 6 | – | 2 |
| William & Mary | 4 | – | 4 | – | 1 | 9 | – | 7 | – | 2 |
| Hofstra ‡ | 4 | – | 4 | – | 1 | 12 | – | 10 | – | 1 |
| Towson | 3 | – | 5 | – | 1 | 8 | – | 7 | – | 2 |
| George Mason | 3 | – | 6 | – | 0 | 7 | – | 11 | – | 1 |
| Drexel | 2 | – | 7 | – | 0 | 5 | – | 12 | – | 0 |
| Delaware | 1 | – | 8 | – | 0 | 4 | – | 13 | – | 1 |
‡ – 2004 CAA Tournament champion + – Invited to the 2004 NCAA Division I Men's Soccer Championship; As of December 21, 2004; Rankings from United Soccer Coaches

The 2004 VCU Rams men's soccer team represented Virginia Commonwealth University in all 2004 NCAA Division I men's college soccer competitions.

The 2004 season saw the Rams make their deepest-ever run in the NCAA Division I Men's Soccer Tournament, reaching the quarterfinals of the competition, before losing to eventual national runners-up, UC Santa Barbara. During their quarterfinal run, the Rams knocked off Atlantic 10 Men's Soccer Tournament champions, George Washington, and the number one team in the country, Wake Forest. Outside of NCAA play, the Rams won the Colonial Athletic Association regular season title. It would not be until 2018 the Rams would again win a conference regular season championship.

== Roster ==
Updated: December 7, 2004

Note: Flags indicate national team as defined under FIFA eligibility rules; some limited exceptions apply. Players may hold more than one non-FIFA nationality.

| No. | Pos. | Nation | Player |
|---|---|---|---|
| 0 | GK | USA | Rob Szymanik |
| 1 | GK | CRC | Saul Montero |
| 2 | DF | USA | Ryan Wood |
| 3 | DF | CRC | Gonzalo Segares |
| 4 | DF | GER | Veit Schaidinger |
| 5 | DF | USA | Hugh MacDonald |
| 6 | MF | ITA | Simon Toselli |
| 7 | MF | USA | Shane DuBay |
| 8 | MF | USA | Ricardo Valverde |
| 9 | FW | USA | Pat Viray |
| 10 | MF | ITA | Helmis Matute |
| 11 | FW | USA | Brian Morris |

| No. | Pos. | Nation | Player |
|---|---|---|---|
| 12 | DF | USA | Matthew Warncke |
| 13 | MF | USA | Chris Chaves |
| 14 | MF | SCO | Scott Millar |
| 15 | FW | GHA | Ricardo Opoku |
| 16 | MF | GHA | Samuel Asante |
| 17 | MF | USA | Mike Aust |
| 18 | DF | USA | Evan Morris |
| 19 | DF | USA | Mike Bear |
| 20 | MF | SCO | Stephen Shirley |
| 22 | FW | USA | Wes Reed |
| 23 | FW | GHA | Dominic Oduro |
| 24 | MF | USA | Jason Jackson |

== Schedule ==
| Date Time, TV | Rank^{#} | Opponent^{#} | Result | Record | Site (Attendance) City, State |
Regular season
| 09/03/2004*; 7:00 pm | No. 13 | La Salle | W 2–0 | 1–0–0 | Sports Backers Stadium (232); Richmond, VA |
| 09/05/2004*; 7:00 pm | No. 13 | No. 28 New Mexico | L 1–2 ^{OT} | 1–1–0 | Sports Backers Stadium (245); Richmond, VA |
| 09/10/2004*; 7:00 pm | No. 22 | vs. No. 5 Wake Forest; Carolina Nike Classic | L 0–1 ^{2OT} | 1–2–0 | Fetzer Field; Chapel Hill, NC |
| 09/12/2004*; 7:00 pm | | at No. 5 North Carolina; Carolina Nike Classic | W 5–2 | 2–2–0 | Fetzer Field (893); Chapel Hill, NC |
CAA Tournament
| 11/14/2004; 7:00 pm | (1) No. 11 | (5) Hofstra; Semifinals | L 0–1 | 11–5–2 | Sports Backers Stadium; Richmond, VA |
NCAA Tournament
| 11/23/2004; 2:00 pm | (16) No. 15 | George Washington; Second round | W 2–0 | 12–5–2 | Sports Backers Stadium (746); Richmond, VA |
| 11/27/2004; 2:00 pm | (16) No. 15 | at (1) No. 1 Wake Forest; Third round | T 2–2; W 3–2 pen. ^{2OT} | 12–5–3 | Spry Stadium (1,447); Winston-Salem, NC |
| 12/04/2004; 9:00 pm | (16) No. 15 | at (9) No. 8 UC Santa Barbara; Quarterfinals | L 1–4 | 12–6–3 | Harder Stadium (11,214); Santa Barbara, CA |
*Non-conference game. ^{#}Rankings from United Soccer Coaches. (#) Tournament seedings in parentheses.

== Rankings ==
Ranking movement Legend: ██ Improvement in ranking. ██ Decrease in ranking. ██ Not ranked the previous week. RV=Others receiving votes.
| Poll | Pre | Wk 1 | Wk 2 | Wk 3 | Wk 4 | Wk 5 | Wk 6 | Wk 7 | Wk 8 | Wk 9 | Wk 10 | Wk 11 | Wk 12 | Wk 13 | Wk 14 | Wk 15 | Wk 16 | Final |
|---|---|---|---|---|---|---|---|---|---|---|---|---|---|---|---|---|---|---|
| NSCAA National | 13 | RV | RV | RV | | | | | | | | | | None Released | | | | |
| NSCAA South Atlantic Regional | | | 6 | | | | | | | | | | | None Released | | | | |
| Soccer America | 16 | RV | RV | | | | | | | | | | | | | | | |
| Soccer Times | 22 | RV | RV | | | | | | | | | | | | | | | |
| College Soccer News | 19 | 23 | 23 | | | | | | | | | | | | | | | |
