= 2015 Elon Phoenix men's soccer team =

American college soccer season

2015 Elon Phoenix men's soccer
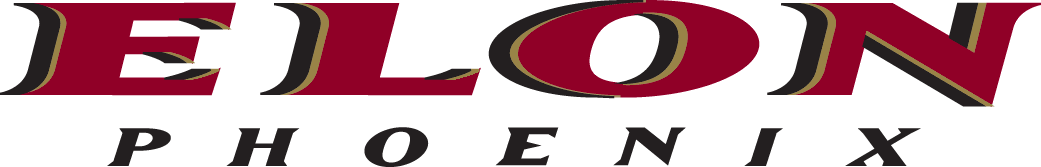
- Conference: Colonial Athletic Association
- Record: 14–6–1 (6–2–0 CAA)
- Head coach: Chris Little (2nd season)
- Assistant coach: Jonathan Potter (5th season)
- Home stadium: Rudd Field

2015 Colonial Athletic Association men's soccer standings
	Conf.					Overall
Team	W		L		T	W		L		T
Hofstra ‡	6	–	2	–	0	14	–	8	–	0
Elon +	6	–	2	–	0	14	–	6	–	1
Delaware	5	–	2	–	1	10	–	7	–	4
Charleston	4	–	3	–	1	7	–	8	–	2
UNC Wilmington	3	–	3	–	2	8	–	8	–	3
James Madison	3	–	3	–	2	5	–	10	–	4
William & Mary	2	–	6	–	0	7	–	8	–	2
Northeastern	2	–	6	–	0	3	–	12	–	2
Drexel	2	–	6	–	0	3	–	15	–	1
‡-Tournament champion +- Invited to the NCAA Division I Men's Soccer Championship; As of November 22, 2015; Rankings from NSCAA

The 2015 Elon Phoenix men's soccer team represented Elon University during the 2015 NCAA Division I men's soccer season. It was the 44th season of the university fielding a program, and the 13th season in NCAA Division I competition. It was the program's second season with Chris Little as head coach. Little, the sixth head coach in program history, formerly coached the Carolina Dynamo of the Premier Development League before assuming his current role at Elon. On 12 September 2015, the Phoenix defeated in-state rival Davidson 4-0 to achieve its best start in school history (5-0-0). On 22 September 2015, the team recorded a school record #8 ranking by the NSCAA after mid-week victories over #7 Wake Forest and CAA opponent Drexel. Those wins improved their record to 7-0-0, thus extending the program's record start to seven wins.

== Roster ==
As of 2015: Note: Flags indicate national team as defined under FIFA eligibility rules; some limited exceptions apply. Players may hold more than one non-FIFA nationality.

No.	Pos.	Nation	Player
00	GK	USA	Jimmy Coyle
0	GK	USA	Julian Dean
1	GK	USA	Matthew Jegier
2	DF	ENG	Jonathan Coleby (captain)
3	DF	USA	Connor Mansfield
4	DF	USA	Nicholas O'Callaghan
5	DF	USA	Jonathan Wenger
6	DF	USA	Sam McBride
7	MF	HON	Eduardo Alvarez
8	MF	MEX	Miguel Salazar (captain)
9	MF	ENG	Amir Berkane
10	MF	ENG	James Brace
11	MF	USA	Luis Argudo
12	FW	BRA	Cauê Da Silva

No.	Pos.	Nation	Player
14	FW	ENG	Jaiden Fortune
15	FW	USA	Cooper Vandermaas-Peeler
16	MF	USA	Taylor Adler
17	MF	USA	Myles Mansfield
18	MF	USA	Elijah Agu
19	DF	USA	Nathan Diehl
20	MF	USA	Nick Adamczyk
21	MF	ENG	Billy Beresford
22	MF	USA	Hassan Pinto
24	DF	NZL	Will Smith
26	GK	USA	Christopher Shannon
27	DF	USA	Jared Bishop
—	FW	VIR	Konner Kendall
—	MF	LBR	Judah Brown

== Schedule ==
Date Time, TV	Rank^{#}	Opponent^{#}	Result	Record	Site (Attendance) City, State
Preseason
08-16-2015*; 7:00 pm		at No. 17 UNC Charlotte	L 0–1		Transamerica Field; Charlotte, NC
08-20-2015*; 7:00 pm		at NC State	W 3–2		Dail Soccer Field; Raleigh, NC
Regular season
08-28-2015*; 5:00 pm		vs. DePaul; John Rennie/Nike Classic	W 4–0	1–0–0	Koskinen Stadium (686); Durham, NC
08-30-2015*; 12:00 pm		vs. Saint Mary's; John Rennie/Nike Classic	W 1–0	2–0–0	Koskinen Stadium (217); Durham, NC
09-04-2015*; 5:00 pm		vs. Campbell; UNC Wilmington Classic	W 2–0	3–0–0	UNCW Soccer Stadium (858); Wilmington, NC
09-06-2015*; 12:00 pm		vs. North Florida; UNC Wilmington Classic	W 5–2	4–0–0	UNCW Soccer Stadium (1,113); Wilmington, NC
09-12-2015*; 7:00 pm	No. RV	Davidson	W 4–0	5–0–0	Rudd Field (1,088); Elon, NC
09-15-2015*; 7:00 pm	No. 20	at No. 7 Wake Forest	W 1–0	6–0–0	Spry Stadium (2,204); Winston-Salem, NC
09-18-2015; 7:00 pm	No. 20	Drexel; CAA Match	W 3–1	7–0–0 (1–0–0)	Rudd Field (1,523); Elon, NC
09-22-2015*; 7:00 pm, SEC Network +	No. 8	at South Carolina	L 1–3	7–1–0	Stone Stadium (2,458); Columbia, SC
09-26-2015; 7:00 pm	No. 8	at Delaware; CAA Match	W 1–0	8–1–0 (2–0–0)	Delaware Mini-Stadium (854); Newark, DE
09-30-2015; 7:00 pm	No. 10	at William & Mary; CAA Match	L 1–4	8–2–0 (2–1–0)	Martin Family Stadium (123); Williamsburg, VA
10-07-2015; 3:30 pm	No. 13	Northeastern; CAA Match	W 2–1	9–2–0 (3–1–0)	Rudd Field (625); Elon, NC
10-10-2015*; 7:00 pm	No. 13	Lipscomb	W 1–0	10–2–0	Rudd Field (564); Elon, NC
10-14-2015; 7:30 pm	No. 11	at No. RV UNC Wilmington; CAA Match	W 2–1	11–2–0 (4–1–0)	UNCW Soccer Stadium (1,131); Wilmington, NC
10-17-2015; 8:00 pm	No. 11	James Madison; CAA Match / Homecoming	W 2–1	12–2–0 (5–1–0)	Rudd Field (1,065); Elon, NC
10-20-2015*; 7:00 pm	No. 10	at Duke	L 1–2 ^{OT}	12–3–0	Koskinen Stadium (407); Durham, NC
10-24-2015; 7:00 pm	No. 10	at No. 24 Hofstra; CAA Match	L 0–1	12–4–0 (5–2–0)	Hofstra Soccer Stadium (485); Hempstead, NY
10-31-2015; 7:00 pm	No. 19	Charleston; CAA Match / Senior Night	W 1–0 ^{2 OT}	13–4–0 (6–2–0)	Rudd Field (826); Elon, NC
11-04-2015*; 7:00 pm	No. 21	No. RV Radford	L 0–2	13–5–0	Rudd Field (810); Elon, NC
CAA Tournament
11-13-2015; 4:30 pm	No. RV	vs. (3) Delaware; Semifinal	T 2–2 (4–5) ^{2 OT}	13–5–1	Hofstra Soccer Stadium (508); Hempstead, NY
NCAA Tournament
11-19-2015*; 7:00 pm	No. RV	Winthrop; First Round	W 3–0	14–5–1	Rudd Field (2,419); Elon, NC
11-22-2015*; 6:00 pm, ESPN3	No. RV	at No. 2 Clemson; Second Round	L 2–5	14–6–1	Historic Riggs Field (1,941); Clemson, SC
*Non-conference game. ^{#}Rankings from United Soccer Coaches. (#) Tournament seedings in parentheses.

== See also ==
- Elon Phoenix men's soccer
- 2015 NCAA Division I men's soccer season
- 2015 CAA Men's Soccer Tournament
- 2015 NCAA Division I Men's Soccer Championship
