= 1958 Drexel Dragons men's soccer team =

American college soccer season

1958 Drexel Dragons men's soccer

ISFA National Champions

Middle Atlantic Champions
- Conference: Middle Atlantic States Athletic Conference
- College–Southern

Ranking
- Coaches: No. 1
- Record: 12–0–0 (3–0–0 MASAC)
- Head coach: Don Yonker (12th season)
- Captains: Stanislav Długosz; Robert Muschek

The 1958 Drexel Dragons men's soccer team was the 12th season of the program's existence. The program competed as an independent during the 1958 ISFA season, the final year before the NCAA began sponsor collegiate varsity soccer.

The 1958 season was the most accomplished season in program history. Drexel posted a perfect 12-0-0 record, and won the ISFA National Championship, the predecessor to the NCAA Division I Men's Soccer Championship. The Dragons scored a record 76 goals in 12 matches, while only conceding 15. Drexel was led by Polish striker Stanislav Długosz, who had 57 points on the season, which remains a record for Drexel. During their match against Rider, Igor Lissy had a program record three assists, a record that would not be tied until 1991. Lissy led the team in scoring with 22 goals in just 12 matches. Outside of the ISFA title, Drexel won the Middle Atlantic States Athletic Conference.

Robert Muschek, Długosz and Ozzie Jethon were named All-Americans at the end of the season.

Head coach Donald Y. Yonker was inducted into the United Soccer Coaches Hall of Fame in 1992.

== Roster ==
The following players were part of Drexel's squad during the 1958 season:

Note: Flags indicate national team as defined under FIFA eligibility rules; some limited exceptions apply. Players may hold more than one non-FIFA nationality.

No.	Pos.	Nation	Player
—		SCO	George Annett
—		USA	Robert Antrasian
—		USA	Charles Boecklin
—	FW	POL	Stanislav Długosz
—		GER	Charles Frankenberger
—		USA	Austin Gleeson
—		USA	Donald Hobson
—	MF	UKR	Ozzie Jethon
—		USA	William Johnston
—		ENG	Charles Jones

No.	Pos.	Nation	Player
—	FW	URS	Igor Lissy
—	DF	USA	Robert Muschek
—	DF	USA	Donald Reiter
—	FW	USA	Ronald Ritter
—		WAL	George Sawcheck
—		ENG	George Simon
—		UKR	Leon Skochko
—		ENG	Bently Stuart
—		USA	David Van Dyke
—		USA	Stanley Wybranski

== Schedule ==
Date Time, TV	Rank^{#}	Opponent^{#}	Result	Record	Site City, State
Exhibition
October 4		vs. Drexel Alumni	W 7–0		Philadelphia, PA
Regular season
October 11		at Western Maryland	W 7–1	1–0–0 (1–0–0)	Westminster, MD
October 14		Rider	W 10–1	2–0–0 (2–0–0)	
October 18		at Elizabethtown	W 4–2	3–0–0 (3–0–0)	
October 21	No. 10	Delaware	W 7–2	4–0–0 (4–0–0)	
October 25	No. 10	at Wagner	W	5–0–0 (5–0–0)	
October 29	No. 8	West Chester	W	6–0–0 (6–0–0)	
November 1	No. 8	Washington (MD)	W 6–1	7–0–0 (7–0–0)	
November 4	No. 8	at Ursinus	W 8–2	8–0–0 (8–0–0)	
November 8	No. 3	Bucknell	W	9–0–0	
November 11	No. 1	at La Salle	W 7–1	10–0–0	
November 15	No. 1	at Johns Hopkins	W 2–0	11–0–0	
November 18	No. 1	Lehigh	W 5–2	12–0–0	Philadelphia, PA
