= Fredericksburg Gunners =

- Full name: F.C. Fredericksburg Gunners
- Nicknames: The Gunners, FC Fred
- Founded: 2006
- Dissolved: 2009
- Ground: Fredericksburg Academy
- Owner: Brian Shumate
- Head Coach: Cristian Neagu
- League: USL Premier Development League
- 2009: 6th, Mid Atlantic did not qualify for playoffs
Home colors	Away colors

Fredericksburg Gunners was an American soccer team based in Fredericksburg, Virginia, United States. Founded in 2006, the team played in the USL Premier Development League (PDL), the fourth tier of the American Soccer Pyramid, until 2009, after which the franchise folded and the team left the league.

The team played its home games at the Fredericksburg Academy. The team's colors were royal blue, red and white.

The team had a sister organization, the Fredericksburg Lady Gunners, who played in the women's USL W-League, and also fielded a team in the USL's Super-20 League, a league for players 17 to 20 years of age run under the United Soccer Leagues umbrella.

== History ==
Fredericksburg Gunners announced their entrance into the PDL in December 2006, and their pre-season squad was led by former Coventry City and Southampton defender Paul Williams. Romanian native Cristian Neagu took over from Williams prior to the regular season, and as player-manager led the Gunners to a promising debut. They won their first two games in impressive style, demolishing the Northern Virginia Royals 7–0 in only their second competitive game (with Neagu scoring a hat trick), and only a 3–1 defeat to Richmond Kickers Future stopped them from qualifying for the US Open Cup at the first attempt. As the season progressed, Fredericksburg's results kept them in the playoff hunt: a five-game unbeaten streak in mid-June which included consecutive 4-goal hauls in their wins over Virginia Legacy and Northern Virginia Royals looked to have secured them their slot in the post season. However, a dip in form during August culminated in back-to-back away defeats to Ocean City Barons and West Virginia Chaos, and the season ended with the Gunners in fifth place behind divisional champions Hampton Roads Piranhas. Anthony Andrews was the top scorer with 8 goals, while the Romanian contingent of Neagu and Adrian Bumbut were the top providers, with 10 goals and 6 assists between them.

2008 began positively for the Gunners with four straight wins: their 4–0 opening day victory over Northern Virginia Royals was followed subsequent victories over Richmond Kickers Future, the previously unbeatable Hampton Roads Piranhas, and the Rhode Island Stingrays. Their magnificent start brought them their first ever berth in the US Open Cup, where they faced USL2 outfit Richmond Kickers, the senior team of their divisional rivals; unfortunately for the Gunners, their campaign was a short one, as they lost 3–0 first time out. Back in league play, Fredericksburg's form continued strongly through the month of June, in which the team enjoyed another three victories, including another comprehensive takedown of Northern Virginia Royals. A playoff berth looked almost set in stone but, inexplicably, everything fell apart in July: the Gunners lost five of their final six regular season games – they conceded a last minute goal against Richmond Kickers Future to lose 1–0, allowed the Brooklyn Knights to come from behind twice to win 3–2, and lost 4–3 away at the Westchester Flames on the final day of the season with yet another 90th minute catastrophe. They eventually finished second in the Mid Atlantic Division behind Reading Rage, and missed out on the Eastern Conference playoffs by virtue of Newark Ironbound Express having a better record. Player-coach Cristian Neagu was again the Gunners' top scorer, with 6 goals, while Matt Lacey contributed five assists.

Cristian Neagu is affectionately known as 'The Romanian Flounder' by both Gunner's supporters and rival fans due to his habit of falling over too easily.

== Players ==
=== Final roster ===
as at June 18, 2009

Note: Flags indicate national team as defined under FIFA eligibility rules; some limited exceptions apply. Players may hold more than one non-FIFA nationality.

No.	Pos.	Nation	Player
1	GK	USA	Ken Manahan
4	DF	USA	Michael Dinuzzo
5	DF	NIR	Tennant McVea
7	MF	USA	Jordan Evans
8	MF	ENG	Matt Lacey
9	FW	USA	Brian Ownby
10	MF	USA	Neil Barlow
11	MF	UGA	Onesimus Ikungo
12	FW	SLE	Shaka Bangura
13	DF	USA	Dylan Boyd
14	DF	USA	Brion Kelly
15	DF	USA	Sam Brooks
16	MF	USA	Lance Nelson

No.	Pos.	Nation	Player
17	FW	USA	C. J. Sapong
19	MF	USA	Jimmy Simpson
20	DF	USA	Jorge Lopez
21	MF	ENG	Joseph Townsend
23	GK	USA	Patrick Mitrovich
24	MF	USA	Justin Grove
26	DF	USA	Michael Handlin
29	DF	USA	Matt Weiler
—	MF	ESP	Miguel Casajuana
—	MF	USA	Kern Gardiner
—	MF	USA	Michael Volk

== Year-by-year ==
Year	Division	League	Regular season	Playoffs	Open Cup
2007	4	USL PDL	5th, Mid Atlantic	Did not qualify	Did not qualify
2008	4	USL PDL	2nd, Mid Atlantic	Did not qualify	1st Round
2009	4	USL PDL	6th, Mid Atlantic	Did not qualify	Did not qualify

== Head coaches ==
- (England) Paul Williams (2006)
- (Romania) Cristian Neagu (2007–2009)

== Stadiums ==
- Fredericksburg Field House; Fredericksburg, Virginia (2007–2008)
- Fredericksburg Academy; Fredericksburg, Virginia (2009)

== Average attendance ==
Attendance stats are calculated by averaging each team's self-reported home attendances from the historical match archive at https://web.archive.org/web/20100105175057/http://www.uslsoccer.com/history/index_E.html.

- 2007: 306
- 2008: not yet available
- 2009: 168
