= 2003 VCU Rams men's soccer team =

VCU Rams
2003 season
- Athletic Director: Norwood Teague
- Head coach: Tim Sullivan
- CAA Regular season: 1st
- CAA Tournament: Champions
- College Cup: Regional semifinals
- Highest home attendance: 2,927 vs. Virginia Tech
- Average home league attendance: 64 vs. Howard
Home colors	Away colors

The 2003 VCU Rams men's soccer team represented Virginia Commonwealth University during the 2003 NCAA Division I men's soccer season, playing in the Colonial Athletic Association.

The season was one of the most successful season in the program's history, as the Rams won both the CAA regular season and tournament champions successfully defending their titles from 2002. By winning the CAA Tournament, the Rams qualified for NCAA Division I Men's Soccer Championship, for the second straight year and for the sixth time in the program's history. In the NCAA tournament, the Rams advanced to the final sixteen (Regional semifinals), at the time, their deepest run in the tournament.

== Team ==
=== 2010 roster ===
Note: Flags indicate national team as defined under FIFA eligibility rules; some limited exceptions apply. Players may hold more than one non-FIFA nationality.

No.	Pos.	Nation	Player
0	GK	NED	Jack van Arsdale
1	GK	USA	Clark Hankins
2	FW	USA	B. J. Watson
3	MF	CRC	Juan Monge Solano
4	DF	USA	Peter Lee
5	MF	LBN	Joseph Haboush
6	MF	GER	Curt Van Brackle
7	FW	ENG	Nick Rich
9	MF	JAM	Jason Johnson
10	FW	JAM	Romena Bowie
11	FW	ZAM	Yoram Mwila
13	MF	GUA	Jose Carlos Castillo

No.	Pos.	Nation	Player
14	DF	USA	Matthew Scott
15	MF	USA	Chris Maimone
17	DF	USA	Garrett Harvey
18	MF	USA	Nate Shiffman
19	DF	SEN	Assane Keita
21	GK	USA	Andrew Wells
22	DF	USA	Brad Seymour
23	GK	CYP	Josh Pantazelos
24	DF	USA	Mike Jennings
26	FW	USA	Chase Farnsworth
27	DF	USA	Will Donovan
28	DF	IND	Chirag Shah

=== Coaching staff ===
Position	Name
Head coach	Dave Giffard
Assistant coaches	Ryan Pratt; Brett Teach
Graduate Assistant	Matt Cannady

== Match results ==
Lists of matches, featuring result, attendance (where available) and scorers, grouped by competition (league, cup, other competition). Do not include friendly matches.

=== Legend ===
Win	Tie	Loss

Home team listed on the right, away team listed on the left. Teams with a "#" sign represents their NSCAA National Ranking at the time of the match.

=== Regular season ===
August 26, 2003 1	West Virginia	1–2	VCU	Richmond, Virginia
19:30 EDT		Report		Stadium: Sports Backers Stadium; Attendance: 572

August 31, 2003 2	Clemson	0–2	VCU	Richmond, Virginia
19:30 EDT		Report		Stadium: Sports Backers Stadium; Attendance: 452

September 5, 2003 3	VCU	4–1	UCF	Orlando, Florida
19:30 EDT		Report		Stadium: UCF Soccer and Track Stadium; Attendance: 123

September 7, 2003 4	VCU	1–4	FIU	Miami, Florida
19:30 EDT	Cephas 60'	Report	Williams 18', 88'; Boswell 43'; Plentz 55'	Stadium: FIU Soccer Stadium; Attendance: 236; Referee: Tim Bower

September 12, 2003 5	VCU	1–3	UNC Greensboro	Chapel Hill, North Carolina
19:30 EDT	Neagu 89'	Report	Jones 65', 85'; Patterson 70'	Stadium: Fetzer Field; Attendance: 185; Referee: Tim Bower
Note: Tar Heel Tournament

September 14, 2003 6	VCU	1–2 (a.e.t.)	North Carolina	Chapel Hill, North Carolina
19:30 EDT	Neagu 47'	Report	Storey 31'; Rhea 96'	Stadium: Fetzer Field; Attendance: 1,374; Referee: Roger Morton
Note: Tar Heel Tournament

November 7, 2003 18	#12 VCU	2–1	Virginia	Charlottesville, Virginia
19:30 EDT	Cephas 49'; Delicate 60'	Report	Hill 50'	Stadium: Klockner Stadium; Attendance: 2,227; Referee: Gus St. Silva

=== CAA Tournament ===
November 12, 2010 Semifinals	VCU	1–2	Hofstra	Williamsburg, Virginia
19:00 EDT	Gehin-Scott (yellow card) 75'; Fonseca 76'; Seymour (yellow card) 84'	Report	Barera (yellow card) 55'; Watkin (yellow card) 79'; Foster (red card) 82'; Ehrichs (yellow card) 82'; Botte 86'; Grahn 90'	Stadium: Albert-Daly Field; Attendance: 353; Referee: Andrew Chapin

=== NCAA Tournament ===
November 26, 2003 R2	#22 Virginia Tech	2–5	#9 VCU	Richmond, Virginia
19:00 EDT	O'Brien 28'; Dyer 66'	Report	Delicâte 2', 21'; Cephas 19', 34', 59'	Stadium: Sports Backers Stadium; Attendance: 2,927

November 30, 2003 Reg. SF	#9 VCU	0–5	#5 Indiana	Bloomington, Indiana
19:00 EDT	Reed (yellow card) 38'; Neagu (yellow card) 47'; Cephas (red card) 55'; Shirley (yellow card) 84'	Report	Plotkin 63'; Tudela 74'; Peterson 80'; Yates 86'; Chirico 90'	Stadium: Bill Armstrong Stadium; Attendance: 1,751; Referee: Cien Asoera
