= David Castellanos =

American soccer player

Personal information
- Date of birth: February 26, 1980 (age 46)
- Place of birth: Fairfax, Virginia, United States
- Height: 6 ft 1 in (1.85 m)
- Positions: Forward; midfielder

College career
Years	Team	Apps	(Gls)
1998–1999	Mercer County Vikings		
2000–2001	Connecticut Huskies		

Senior career*
Years	Team	Apps	(Gls)
2002–2004	Motagua		(1)
2004	Colorado Rapids	3	(0)
2004	Minnesota Thunder	14	(5)
2005	Virginia Beach Mariners	27	(4)
2005–2010	Philadelphia KiXX (indoor)	96	(29)

Managerial career
- 2005–2018: Penn State Abington Lions
- 2013–2015: Reading United
- 2019–2022: Drexel Dragons (assistant)
- 2023: Chestnut Hill Griffins
- 2024–: Drexel Dragons
- * Club domestic league appearances and goals

David Castellanos (born February 26, 1980) is an American soccer coach and former player who is currently the head coach at Drexel University. Prior to Drexel, he served as the head coach for Chestnut Hill College, Penn State Abington, as well as the USL League Two side, Reading United. Castellanos was also an assistant at Drexel before taking over as head manager.

As a player, Castellanos played as both a midfielder and forward, and played professionally in the Honduran Liga Nacional, as well as in Major League Soccer, and the USL First Division.

== Playing career ==
Born in Virginia, Castellanos grew up in Philadelphia, Pennsylvania. In 1998, he graduated from Christopher Dock Mennonite High School. In 1998, Castellanos began his collegiate career at Mercer County Community College. In 2000, he transferred to the University of Connecticut. That season, the Huskies won the 2000 NCAA Division I Men's Soccer Championship with Castellanos assisting on the Huskies second goal. Castellanos graduated with a bachelor's degree in sociology. In 2002, Castellanos turned professional with F.C. Motagua in the Liga Nacional de Fútbol Profesional de Honduras. On March 30, 2004, the Colorado Rapids of Major League Soccer, signed Castellanos. He played three games, then was released on June 11, 2004. On June 23, 2004, the Minnesota Thunder signed him to a two-year contract. In 2005, he played for the Virginia Beach Mariners. On November 9, 2005, Castellanos moved indoors with the Philadelphia KiXX of the second Major Indoor Soccer League. Castellanos played for the KiXX until the team ceased operations in 2010. During that time, the KiXX won the 2007 MISL championship.

== Managerial career ==
In August 2006, Castellanos became coach of Penn State Abington men's and women's soccer teams.

USL Premier Development League side Reading United A.C. named Castellanos as the club's head coach on December 28, 2013. He left his post as head coach after the 2015 season.

Castellanos became the Head Coach for the Chestnut Hill College men's soccer team spring of 2023, before becoming the head coach of Drexel in 2024.
