= VCU Rams men's soccer =

American college soccer team

- Founded: 1978; 48 years ago
- University: Virginia Commonwealth University
- Head coach: Vacant
- Conference: A-10
- Location: Richmond, Virginia, US
- Stadium: Sports Backers Stadium (capacity: 3,250)
- Nickname: Rams
- Colors: Black and gold
| Home | Away |

NCAA tournament Quarterfinals
- 2004

NCAA tournament Round of 16
- 2003, 2004

NCAA tournament Round of 32
- 1997, 2003, 2004, 2012, 2017

NCAA tournament appearances
- 1997, 1998, 1999, 2002, 2003, 2004, 2012, 2013, 2017

Conference tournament championships
- 1997, 2002, 2003

Conference regular season championships
- 1993, 1998, 2002, 2003, 2004, 2018, 2023

The VCU Rams men's soccer team is an intercollegiate varsity sports team of Virginia Commonwealth University, an NCAA Division I member school located in the state's capital of Richmond. The team is a member of the Atlantic 10 Conference.

Since their foundation, the team has won three conference championships, all of which came in the Colonial Athletic Association, and four regular season titles. The Rams have qualified for seven NCAA Division I Men's Soccer Championships, most recently coming in 2012. Most of the team's success has come within the last 15 seasons, as they first reached the NCAA Tournament in 1997. The program's best performance in the tournament came in 2004, when the Rams reached the quarterfinals of the tournament, knocking off the top seed, Wake Forest, in the process.

The Rams are presently coached by David Giffard, who was a former assistant coach under Caleb Porter for the Akron Zips. Under Giffard, the Rams have qualified for three NCAA Tournaments, two as national seeds, and have won one Atlantic 10 Regular Season title. As of 2022, Giffard is the second longest tenured head coach in program history.

== History ==
Beginning in 1978, Virginia Commonwealth University fielded an NCAA Division I men's varsity soccer program that competed independently, joining the Sun Belt Conference in 1979. Ben Satterfield was the team's initial head coach and was at the helm until the end of the 1982 season. Ben Satterfield's teams got progressively better, and in 1981, was ranked #1 in the Mid-Atlantic Region, and was in the NCAA Division I Top 25 in the nation. VCU had a bye going into the 1981 Sun Belt Tournament with a 12–5–3 record, and lost a heart-breaker to University of South Alabama 2–1, ending their season. Roosevelt Lundy took over in 1983, and struggled to do well in the conference.

Following Steuckenschneider's departure in 1994, Tim Sullivan took over the head coaching job. It was also the same year VCU left the Metro Atlantic Athletic Conference to join the Colonial Athletic Association. Under Sullivan's tenure, the team enjoyed their most success both in conference play and in NCAA play, earning their first ever berth in the NCAA Division I Men's Soccer Championship.

Initially, the young team had struggles in the Colonial Athletic Association, finishing towards the bottom of the conference standings in its first two years. In 1997, the team vastly improved, earning a third-place regular season record and earning the CAA championship that year. In the 1997 Championship, the Rams defeated American University 9–8 in a penalty kick shootout after drawing 2–2 in regulation time.

Since then the team won the CAA championship in 2002 and 2003, as well as winning the regular-season title those same years as well as winning the honor in 2004.

The team's most successful run in the College Cup, the men's NCAA Division I Soccer Tournament, came in 2004, where the Rams entered the tournament as ranked 16th in the nation, earning a bye to the second round proper. In the second round, the Rams defeated George Washington, before upsetting the number-one seeded, Wake Forest Demon Deacons in penalty kicks. Reaching the regional finals, or quarterfinals in the entire tournament, VCU lost to eventual national finalists, the UC Santa Barbara Gauchos.

Following the end of the 2009 season, VCU hit a team nadir, falling to last place in the CAA, their worst in the history. Following the conclusion of the season, 15-year head coach, Tim O'Sullivan was fired to be replaced by David Giffard, thus making Giffard the sixth head coach in VCU men's soccer history. Giffard's facelifting of the team was credited in their finishing as regular season runners-up in 2010.

The Giffard-led program began play in the Atlantic 10 Conference during the 2012 NCAA Division I men's soccer season, where the Rams finished fourth in the Atlantic 10 table, and reached the final of the 2012 Atlantic 10 Men's Soccer Tournament, only to lose to Saint Louis in the final. The Rams secured an at-large bid to the 2012 NCAA Division I Men's Soccer Championship, making it the first time since 2004 the Rams qualified. In the tournament, VCU was seeded fourteenth in the tournament. They lost to Syracuse Orange in the second round proper of the tournament, 3–2 after extra time.

== Colors and badge ==
The team uses the school colors of black and gold.

== Stadium ==
Along with the women's soccer and the track & field teams, the Virginia Commonwealth men's soccer team plays at the 3,250-seat Sports Backers Stadium. Located three miles north of the Monroe Park Campus, the stadium is adjacent to The Diamond ballpark, where the baseball team plays. Since its completion in 1999, the stadium has served as the primary venue for the team.

== Fans ==
Like all VCU Rams sports teams, the men's soccer team's main fan group is the Rowdy Rams. The Rowdy Rams are situated in the bleachers in front of the nets, and switch sides each half to invoke intimidation on the opposing sides goalkeeper. They sit with the university's marching band. The Rowdy Rams at games refer to themselves as Rowdy FC.

=== Rivalries ===
Over the years, the Rams have developed rivalries with intrastate colleges, both in the Colonial Athletic Association and against non-conference opponents. The team's main rivals, at least before the move to the A10, were considered to be George Mason and Old Dominion, who both played with the Rams in the CAA. Due to the recent success of the teams' programs, some considered William & Mary and James Madison to be tertiary conference rivals of the Rams before their departure for the A10.

In the Rams' new conference home of the A10, their main rival will be the Richmond Spiders, primarily due to the geographical proximity of the two universities.

Outside the CAA and A10, some cite Virginia Tech and University of Virginia as intra-conference, state rivals due to record attendances. Of the three largest attendance crowds in VCU soccer history, two came from home matches against VT and UVA.

== Roster ==
As of 29 Dec 2022

Note: Flags indicate national team as defined under FIFA eligibility rules; some limited exceptions apply. Players may hold more than one non-FIFA nationality.

| No. | Pos. | Nation | Player |
|---|---|---|---|
| 0 | GK | USA | Max Dunphy |
| 00 | GK | USA | John Ermini |
| 1 | GK | USA | Cory Taylor |
| 2 | DF | USA | Yugo Suzuki |
| 3 | DF | USA | Blaize Hardy |
| 5 | MF | SEN | Moussa Ndiaye |
| 7 | MF | USA | Damian Gallegos |
| 8 | MF | NED | Philip Klomp |
| 10 | FW | SEN | Papa Toure |
| 11 | FW | ARG | Camilo Comi |
| 12 | FW | USA | Lance Christmas |
| 13 | FW | USA | Maverick McGann |
| 14 | DF | USA | Ethan Manheim |
| 15 | MF | USA | William Hitchcock |
| 16 | MF | USA | Andres Rodriguez |
| 17 | MF | UGA | Jonathan Kanagwa |
| 18 | DF | USA | Jared Valdes |
| 19 | DF | CRC | Gerardo Castillo |

| No. | Pos. | Nation | Player |
|---|---|---|---|
| 20 | MF | USA | Mouhamed Tucker |
| 21 | MF | USA | Ndayizeye Bonere |
| 22 | MF | USA | Tariq Moutaouakil |
| 23 | MF | USA | Lucas White |
| 24 | MF | USA | Graham Dougald |
| 25 | DF | USA | Justice Campbell |
| 26 | DF | JPN | Hayato Miyano |
| 27 | DF | JAM | Scott McLeod |
| 28 | DF | USA | Nick Barahona |
| 29 | FW | USA | Wladimir Gasant |
| 30 | MF | CGO | Sadock Kilosho |
| 31 | MF | CGO | Pacific Ibanzi |
| 33 | FW | CGO | Nolan Coetzee |
| 36 | MF | USA | David Hughes |
| 37 | DF | USA | Ethan Bayer |
| 51 | GK | JPN | Ittetsu Hirai |
| 99 | FW | USA | Jean-Claude Bilé |

== Team management ==
=== Coaching staff ===
| Position | Name |
|---|---|
| Head coach | (United States) Dave Giffard |
| Assistant Coach | (Venezuela) Carlos Pedraza |
| Assistant Coach | (Argentina) Lucas Paulini |
| Director of Player Development | (United States) Ronnie Pascale |
| Director of Student Development | (Jamaica) Greg Simmonds |
| Assistant Coach | (United States) Alex Fetterly |

=== Head coaching history ===
| Tenure | Name |
|---|---|
| 1978–1982 | (United States) Ben Satterfield |
| 1983–1989 | (United States) Roosevelt Lundy (Italy) Gianni Baldini (Note: Co-Head coach 1983-1987.) |
| 1989–1994 | (Trinidad and Tobago) Lincoln Phillips |
| 1994 | (United States) Jon Steuckenschneider |
| 1995–2009 | (United States) Tim O'Sullivan (Note: Led team to first CAA championship; first NCAA tournament appearance; led team to quarterfinals in 2004.) |
| 2010–present | (United States) David Giffard |

== Seasons ==
This is a list of the most recent seasons at VCU.

| Champions | Runners-up | Third place | Wooden Spoon |

Key to conference record

- GP = Games played
- W = Won
- L = Lost
- T = Tied
- GF = Goals for
- GA = Goals against
- Pts = Points
- Pos. = Final conference position

Key to conference tournament rounds

- R1 = First round
- QF = Quarterfinals
- SF = Final
- F = Final

Key to NCAA tournament rounds

- R1 = First round
- R2 = Second round
- R3 = Third round
- R4 = Fourth round
- QF = Quarterfinals
- SF = Semifinals (College Cup)

| Season | Conference Regular Season | | | | | | | | | Overall | | | | | | | Conference tournament | NCAA tournament | Add. honours |
| Season | Division | GP | W | L | T | GF | GA | Pts. | Pos. | GP | W | L | T | GF | GA | Pts. | Conference tournament | NCAA tournament | Add. honours |
|---|---|---|---|---|---|---|---|---|---|---|---|---|---|---|---|---|---|---|---|
| 1978 | Independent | | | | | | | | | | 14 | 4 | 10 | 0 | | | 12 | | |
| 1979 | Independent | | | | | | | | | | | | | | | | | SF | |
| 1980 | Sun Belt | | | | | | | | | | 21 | 9 | 8 | 4 | 48 | 33 | 31 | SF | |
| 1981 | Sun Belt | | | | | | | | | | 20 | 12 | 5 | 3 | 60 | 27 | 39 | SF | |
| 1982 | Sun Belt | | | | | | | | | | 20 | 5 | 12 | 3 | 26 | 45 | 18 | R1 | |
| 1983 | Sun Belt | | | | | | | | | | 17 | 4 | 12 | 1 | 26 | 50 | 13 | R1 | |
| 1984 | Sun Belt | | | | | | | | | | 20 | 7 | 10 | 3 | 30 | 46 | 24 | R1 | |
| 1985 | Sun Belt | | | | | | | | | | 17 | 9 | 6 | 2 | 34 | 20 | 29 | SF | |
| 1986 | Sun Belt | | | | | | | | 5th | | 19 | 12 | 6 | 1 | 48 | 22 | 37 | SF | |
| 1987 | Sun Belt | 3 | 0 | 3 | 0 | | | 3 | 4th (East) | | 20 | 11 | 7 | 2 | | | 35 | | |
| 1988 | Sun Belt | 3 | 1 | 2 | 0 | | | 3 | 3rd (East) | | 17 | 6 | 9 | 2 | 20 | 32 | 20 | | |
| 1989 | Sun Belt | 3 | 1 | 1 | 1 | | | 4 | 3rd (East) | | 19 | 4 | 12 | 1 | 15 | 45 | 13 | | |
| 1990 | Sun Belt | 7 | 2 | 3 | 2 | | | 8 | 6th | | 18 | 5 | 9 | 4 | 17 | 29 | 19 | | |
| 1991 | Metro | 3 | 1 | 1 | 1 | | | 4 | 3rd | | 19 | 8 | 10 | 1 | 32 | 35 | 25 | Runners-up | |
| 1992 | Metro | 5 | 0 | 2 | 2 | | | 2 | 5th | | 18 | 5 | 11 | 2 | 28 | 39 | 17 | | |
| 1993 | Metro | 5 | 4 | 1 | 0 | 12 | 6 | 12 | 1st | | 18 | 15 | 3 | 0 | 43 | 15 | 45 | SF | |
| 1994 | Metro | 5 | 0 | 5 | 0 | 4 | 13 | 0 | 5th | | 19 | 5 | 14 | 0 | 30 | 47 | 15 | | |
| 1995 | CAA | 8 | 2 | 5 | 1 | 4 | 15 | 7 | 7th | | 19 | 8 | 10 | 1 | 30 | 28 | 25 | QF | |
| 1996 | CAA | 8 | 2 | 5 | 1 | 9 | 16 | 7 | 6th | | 19 | 6 | 9 | 4 | 24 | 26 | 22 | QF | |
| 1997 | CAA | 10 | 4 | 4 | 2 | 15 | 11 | 14 | 3rd | | 23 | 15 | 4 | 4 | 40 | 23 | 49 | Champions | R2 |
| 1998 | CAA | 8 | 7 | 0 | 1 | 21 | 7 | 22 | 1st | | 21 | 12 | 6 | 3 | 38 | 25 | 39 | SF | R1 |
| 1999 | CAA | 8 | 6 | 2 | 0 | 20 | 8 | 18 | 2nd | | 22 | 14 | 7 | 1 | 46 | 25 | 43 | Runners-up | R1 |
| 2000 | CAA | 8 | 2 | 3 | 3 | 10 | 11 | 9 | 6th | | 21 | 9 | 8 | 4 | 22 | 23 | 31 | SF | |
| 2001 | CAA | 5 | 2 | 2 | 1 | 7 | 7 | 7 | 4th | | 21 | 8 | 10 | 3 | 32 | 26 | 27 | Runners-up | |
| 2002 | CAA | 9 | 7 | 1 | 1 | 21 | 6 | 22 | 1st | | 22 | 15 | 5 | 1 | 44 | 20 | 46 | Champions | R3 |
| 2003 | CAA | 9 | 8 | 1 | 0 | 23 | 4 | 24 | 1st | | 22 | 17 | 5 | 0 | 50 | 24 | 51 | Champions | R4 |
| 2004 | CAA | 9 | 7 | 1 | 1 | 14 | 6 | 22 | 1st | | 21 | 12 | 6 | 3 | 36 | 22 | 39 | SF | QF |
| 2005 | CAA | 11 | 4 | 3 | 4 | 11 | 7 | 16 | 4th | | 18 | 6 | 10 | 4 | 20 | 25 | 22 | QF | |
| 2006 | CAA | 11 | 2 | 8 | 1 | 10 | 16 | 7 | 10th | | 18 | 4 | 13 | 1 | 17 | 25 | 13 | | |
| 2007 | CAA | 11 | 7 | 4 | 0 | 28 | 12 | 21 | 3rd | | 20 | 12 | 6 | 2 | 48 | 18 | 38 | SF | |
| 2008 | CAA | 11 | 4 | 5 | 2 | 10 | 10 | 14 | 9th | | 18 | 8 | 8 | 2 | 23 | 18 | 26 | | |
| 2009 | CAA | 11 | 2 | 8 | 1 | 15 | 19 | 7 | 10th | | 17 | 5 | 10 | 2 | 25 | 27 | 17 | | |
| 2010 | CAA | 13 | 5 | 2 | 4 | 11 | 6 | 19 | 2nd | | 19 | 8 | 5 | 6 | 23 | 17 | 30 | SF | |
| 2011 | CAA | 11 | 6 | 5 | 0 | 15 | 14 | 18 | 7th | | 20 | 11 | 9 | 0 | 34 | 24 | 33 | | |
| 2012 | A-10 | 9 | 6 | 1 | 2 | 23 | 11 | 20 | 4th | | 20 | 12 | 3 | 5 | 42 | 25 | 41 | Runners-up | R2 |
| 2013 | A-10 | 8 | 5 | 2 | 1 | 18 | 7 | 16 | 3rd | | 21 | 11 | 8 | 2 | 30 | 20 | 35 | SF | R1 |
| 2014 | A-10 | 8 | 4 | 1 | 3 | 8 | 2 | 15 | 3rd | | 20 | 7 | 8 | 5 | 19 | 11 | 26 | QF | |
| 2015 | A-10 | 8 | 3 | 2 | 3 | 7 | 6 | 12 | 8th | | 21 | 7 | 10 | 4 | 24 | 27 | 25 | Runners-up | |
| 2016 | A-10 | 8 | 4 | 3 | 1 | 12 | 8 | 13 | 5th | | 21 | 8 | 9 | 4 | 27 | 29 | 28 | Runners-up | |
| 2017 | A-10 | 8 | 6 | 2 | 0 | 20 | 6 | 18 | 2nd | | 18 | 12 | 6 | 0 | 41 | 22 | 36 | Runners-up | R2 |
| 2018 | A-10 | 8 | 6 | 1 | 1 | 12 | 3 | 19 | 1st | | 18 | 10 | 6 | 2 | 25 | 17 | 32 | SF | |
| 2019 | A-10 | 8 | 6 | 1 | 1 | 14 | 7 | 19 | 2nd | | 18 | 7 | 8 | 3 | 19 | 23 | 24 | SF | |
| 2020 | A-10 | 6 | 3 | 2 | 1 | 5 | 4 | 10 | 6th | | 9 | 4 | 3 | 2 | 8 | 7 | 14 | | |
| 2021 | A-10 | 8 | 4 | 3 | 1 | 11 | 9 | 13 | 4th | | 18 | 9 | 7 | 2 | 26 | 21 | 29 | QF | |
| 2022 | A-10 | 8 | 3 | 1 | 4 | 9 | 6 | 13 | 3rd | | 17 | 3 | 8 | 6 | 16 | 27 | 15 | QF | |
| 2023 | A-10 | 8 | 5 | 1 | 2 | 13 | 5 | 17 | 1st | | 18 | 7 | 6 | 5 | 23 | 22 | 26 | Runners-up | |
| 2024 | A-10 | 8 | 1 | 4 | 3 | 6 | 9 | 6 | 11th | | 17 | 4 | 6 | 7 | 17 | 20 | 19 | | |

Source for CAA record: NM Athletics
Source for Metro and Sun Belt record: VCU Athletics

== Records and statistics ==
=== Attendance records ===
1. 2,927 v. Virginia Tech (Oct 26, 2003)
2. 2,242 v. Virginia (Sept 25, 2012)
3. 1,987 v. William & Mary (Oct 12, 2011)

=== Career records ===
Points
| Pos. | Player | Career | Pts. |
|---|---|---|---|
| 1 | Matthew Delicâte | 2000–03 | 103 |
| 2 | Ricardo Capilla | 1997–99 | 94 |
| 3 | Kwaku Adu-Gyamfi | 1992–95 | 80 |
| 4 | Orlin Weise | 1985–88 | 72 |
| 5 | Tedmore Henry | 1980–82 | 66 |

Goals
| Pos. | Player | Career | G |
|---|---|---|---|
| 1 | Matthew Delicâte | 2000–03 | 45 |
| 2 | Kwaku Adu-Gyamfi | 1992–95 | 34 |
| 3 | Ricardo Capilla | 1997–99 | 30 |
| 4 | Kevin Jeffrey | 1998–99 | 29 |
| 4 | Orlin Weise | 1985–88 | 29 |

Game-Winning Goals
| Pos. | Player | Career | GWG |
|---|---|---|---|
| 1 | Matthew Delicâte | 2000–03 | 17 |
| 2 | Rafael Santos | 2014–17 | 9 |
| 3 | McColm Cephas | 2002–03 | 7 |
| 3 | Chris Brown | 1978–81 | 7 |
| 5 | Jason Johnson | 2010–12 | 6 |
| 5 | Kharlton Belmar | 2011–14 | 6 |
| 5 | Dennis Castillo | 2012–16 | 6 |
| 5 | Jorge Herranz | 2014–16 | 6 |

=== NCAA tournament results ===
| Season | Competition | Round | Seed | Opponent | Result | Notes |
|---|---|---|---|---|---|---|
| 1997 | NCAA Tournament | R1 | N/A | Georgetown | 1–2 | |
| 1998 | NCAA Tournament | R1 | N/A | South Carolina | 1–2 | |
| 1999 | NCAA Tournament | R1 | N/A | #5 Wake Forest | 1–2 | |
| 2002 | NCAA Tournament | R2 | #8 | Furman | 0–0 | Furman wins in pen. |
| 2003 | NCAA Tournament | R2 | #9 | Virginia Tech | 5–2 | |
| | | R3 | #9 | #5 Indiana | 0–5 | |
| 2004 | NCAA Tournament | R2 | #16 | George Washington | 2–0 | |
| | | R3 | #16 | #1 Wake Forest | 2–2 | VCU wins in pen. |
| | | QF | #16 | #9 UC Santa Barbara | 1–4 | |
| 2012 | NCAA Tournament | R2 | #14 | Syracuse | 2–3 | Syracuse wins in 2OT |
| 2013 | NCAA Tournament | R1 | N/A | Navy | 0–3 | |
| 2017 | NCAA Tournament | R2 | #16 | Butler | 2–3 | |

== Honors ==
=== National ===
- NCAA tournament
  - Runners-up (1): 2004

=== Conference ===
Atlantic 10 Conference

- Regular season
  - Winners (2): 2018, 2023
  - Runners-up (2): 2017, 2019
- Tournament
  - Runners-up (4): 2012, 2015, 2016, 2023

Colonial Athletic Association

- Tournament
  - Champions (3): 1997, 2002, 2003
  - Runners-up (2): 1999, 2001
- Regular season
  - Winners (4): 1998, 2002, 2003, 2004
  - Runners-up (2): 1999, 2010

Metro Conference

- Regular Season
  - Winners (1): 1993
