= Cristian Neagu =

Romanian footballer and manager

Personal information
- Full name: Cristian Neagu
- Date of birth: 9 November 1980 (age 45)
- Place of birth: Ploiești, Romania
- Height: 6 ft 0 in (1.83 m)
- Position: Forward

College career
Years	Team	Apps	(Gls)
2000–2001	Bryant & Stratton Bobcats		
2002–2003	VCU Rams		

Senior career*
Years	Team	Apps	(Gls)
2002–2005	Richmond Kickers Future	59	(30)
2006	Richmond Kickers	14	(4)
2007–2009	Fredericksburg Gunners	32	(11)
2011–2012	Northern Virginia Royals	12	(1)

Managerial career
- 2007–2009: Fredericksburg Gunners
- 2012–2013: Louisburg Hurricanes
- 2014–2015: Eckerd Tritons
- 2016–2017: North Carolina Tar Heels (assistant)
- 2018–2019: Stetson Hatters
- * Club domestic league appearances and goals

Cristian Neagu (born 9 November 1980) is a Romanian retired footballer and manager. He was the head coach for the Stetson Hatters men's soccer program until February 2020. A former recruiting coordinator at UNC Chapel Hill, Neagu was part of the Tar Heels men's soccer program who reached back to back NCAA "Final Four" appearances in 2016 and 2017.

== College and amateur ==
Neagu moved to the United States in 2000 to play college soccer at Bryant & Stratton College. In his first year in 2000, Neagu helped the Bobcats reach the NJCAA final and then a year later led them to an NJCAA title in 2001 and was named first team All-American that same year.

In 2002, Neagu transferred to Virginia Commonwealth University where he started in 43 games during his two years at VCU and was named Second Team All-CAA in 2002 and 2003.

Neagu also played four seasons for Richmond Kickers Future.

== Professional ==
In 2006, Neagu joined USL Second Division club Richmond Kickers. In his only season with Richmond, Neagu made 14 appearances and scored four goals on the way to a USL Second Division title for Richmond. He was also a player-coach for the Fredericksburg Gunners from 2007 to 2009.

== Honours ==
Richmond Kickers

- USL Second Division Champions (1): 2006
