= 1997 NCAA Division I men's soccer tournament =

Men's College Cup (semifinals & final)

Tournament details
- Country: United States
- Teams: 32

Final positions
- Champions: UCLA (3rd title)
- Runners-up: Virginia (6th title game)

Tournament statistics
- Matches played: 31
- Goals scored: 88 (2.84 per match)
- Attendance: 67,764 (2,186 per match)
- Top goal scorer(s): Ben Olsen, Virginia (5)

Awards
- Best player: Seth George, UCLA (MOP offense); Matt Reis, UCLA (MOP defense)

The 1997 NCAA Division I men's soccer tournament was the 38th organized men's college soccer tournament by the National Collegiate Athletic Association, to determine the top college soccer team in the United States. The UCLA Bruins won their third national title by defeating the Virginia Cavaliers in the championship game, 2–0. The final match was played on December 14, 1997, in Richmond, Virginia, at Richmond Stadium for the third straight year. All other games were played at the home field of the higher seeded team.

== National seeds ==
National seeds
Seed	School	Record
#1	Indiana	20–0
#2	Virginia	15–3–3
#3	SMU	17–2
#4	South Carolina	15–2–1
#5	UCLA	17–2
#6	Creighton	15–4–1
#7	American	15–3–4
#8	Florida International	14–5–1

== Bracket ==
First round
1	Indiana	2
Butler	1
Marquette	0
Bowling Green	1
St. John's	2
Brown	1
South Florida	3
8	Florida International	1
5	UCLA	3
Santa Clara	0
Stanford	1
Washington	2
Charlotte	0
Clemson	5
Charleston Southern	0
4	South Carolina	3
3	SMU	1
Rider	0
Dartmouth	5
Boston U.	1
Saint Louis	2
Missouri State	1
Air Force	2
6	Creighton	3
7	American	2
William & Mary	1
Maryland	1
Rutgers	0
VCU	1
Georgetown	2
Howard	0
2	Virginia	3

Second round
1	Indiana	4
Bowling Green	0
St. John's	1
South Florida	2
5	UCLA	1
Washington	0
Clemson	1
4	South Carolina	0
3	SMU	2
Dartmouth	0
Saint Louis	1
6	Creighton	0
7	American	1
Maryland	0
Georgetown	1
2	Virginia	5

Third round
1	Indiana	6
South Florida	0
5	UCLA	2
Clemson	1
3	SMU	0
Saint Louis	0
7	American	1
2	Virginia	2

Semifinals
1	Indiana	0
5	UCLA	1
Saint Louis	1
2	Virginia	3

Championship; Richmond Stadium; Richmond, Virginia
5	UCLA	2
2	Virginia	0

== See also ==
- 1997 NCAA Division I women's soccer tournament
- 1997 NCAA Division II men's soccer tournament
- 1997 NCAA Division III men's soccer tournament
- 1997 NAIA men's soccer tournament
