= Stuart and Suzanne Grant Stadium =

Soccer stadium in Newark, Delaware

- Interactive map of Stuart and Suzanne Grant Stadium
- Former names: Delaware Mini-Stadium
- Location: Newark, Delaware
- Coordinates: 39.66183°N 75.74709°W
- Owner: Delaware Fightin' Blue Hens
- Operator: Delaware Fightin' Blue Hens
- Surface: Grass

Construction
- Opened: 1992; 34 years ago
- Renovated: 2014

Tenants
- Delaware Fightin' Blue Hens men's & women's soccer; women's outdoor track & field

Stuart and Suzanne Grant Stadium is a soccer-specific stadium with a track located in Newark, Delaware on the campus of the University of Delaware. The venue was opened in 1992. Prior to 2014, it was known as Delaware Mini-Stadium. Both the track and stands were renovated in 2014 following a gift from the Grants that was the largest in Delaware athletics history.

== See also ==
- Delaware Stadium
