= American Eagles men's soccer =

American college soccer team

- Founded: 1949; 77 years ago
- University: American University
- Head coach: Zach Samol (8th season)
- Conference: Patriot
- Location: Washington, District of Columbia, US
- Stadium: Reeves Field (capacity: 1,000)
- Nickname: Eagles
- Colors: Blue, white, and red
Home	Away

NCAA tournament runner-up
- 1985

NCAA tournament College Cup
- 1985

NCAA tournament Quarterfinals
- 1979, 1985, 1997

NCAA tournament Round of 16
- 1979, 1984, 1985, 1997, 2001

NCAA tournament appearances
- 1978, 1979, 1984, 1985, 1997, 2001, 2002, 2004, 2020

Conference tournament championships
- 1979, 1997, 2001, 2004, 2020

Conference regular season championships
- 1977, 1979, 1982, 1983, 1984, 1985, 2004, 2005, 2008, 2011, 2012, 2016, 2025

The American Eagles men's soccer team is an intercollegiate varsity sports team of American University. The team is a member of the Patriot League of the National Collegiate Athletic Association. In 1985, the team reached the national championship game, losing to UCLA after eight overtimes.

== History ==
=== Early history (1949–1968) ===
American University kicked off its varsity men's soccer program in 1949 as a member of the Mason-Dixon Conference in the NCAA College Division, the predecessor to Division II, but suspended it after just two seasons when a study by the board of trustees decided the school was too small to field a competitive team (the Eagles had compiled a 2–10 overall record) and the sport was too expensive to fund. It was revived, however, in 1954, with the hopes of replacing the role of the football program (ended by the Board in 1942) as the centerpiece of homecoming weekend and a source of school spirit.

The program had achieved a modicum of success under six different head coaches by the mid-1960s when AU made the decision to move to Division I (the then-University Division), announcing in the spring of 1966 that it would join the Middle Atlantic Conference (MAC), the largest in the nation, for the 1966–67 collegiate year. That left no time, however, to schedule enough conference opponents to be eligible for the MAC's soccer championship, so the Eagles continued to compete in the Mason-Dixon Conference in soccer for one additional season. Since the other schools in the MAC's University Division did not operate as their own division until the 1969 season, this effectively enabled AU to use the 1966–1968 seasons to transition to Division I. The Eagles compiled a 2–14 record against other D1 schools (while going 6-14-3 against D2 opponents in the Mason-Dixon Conference and MAC College Division) over that time under the tenure of tennis coach Larry Nyce for two seasons, then Ned Boehm.

=== Move to Division I (1969–1971) ===
The 1969 season marked the beginning of MAC University Division soccer and AU's real foray into Division 1 under Coach Boehm, with the team compiling a 3–4–1 record against D1 opponents, going 1–3–1 in conference play against the rest of the MAC University Division's eastern section (tying Hofstra at home, beating La Salle on the road, then losing to West Chester at home as well as road games against St. Joseph's and Temple). Junior defender Jeff Wood and freshman forward Fahad Al-Rajaan were named to the all-MAC eastern team, while senior defender Chris Kalavritinos and junior goalkeeper Ira Kamens were named to the NCAA's all-South region team.

In 1970, Boehm left the athletics department to accept a job as assistant director of admissions. His replacement was Sidwell Friends head coach Dick Stimson, who had won three high school championships in eight seasons there, including going undefeated in 1967. The 1970 Eagles would have compiled a 3–5–1 record against D1 competition but for a bizarre game at Reeves Field against new conference foe Drexel. It was a wild affair, with the Eagles blowing a 2–1 lead after trailing 0–1, Al-Rajaan scoring a hat trick on AU's first 3 goals, and junior Jim Tate tying the game 5–5 (after he had previously tied it at 4 on a goal off a corner kick) with just seconds remaining in regulation. With two minutes to play in the second overtime period, Drexel head coach Don Yonker was ejected from the game for assisting one of his players whose leg had cramped despite the referee not stopping play. But he refused to leave the field, so the game was called a forfeit.

AU soccer's coaching carousel would continue in 1971 with Stimson's departure. But Boehm helped recruit Scottish-Canadian John Kerr Sr., a member of the Canadian Men's National Team and professional player in the NASL (at the time for the Washington Darts), who had coached Georgetown's freshman team to an undefeated record in 1970. The student-athletes immediately responded to Kerr's experience as a professional international soccer player who was willing to practice with them and share techniques. Most importantly to the Eagles, Kerr nurtured the sudden interest in soccer by sophomore Kurt Kuykendall, who had been cut from the varsity basketball team after his freshman year and threw himself into learning how to play goalkeeper—a position that was open on the team after the graduation of Kamens. Though the 1971 Eagles’ 2–5–1 record against D1 opponents appeared to be a step backward, the team's play was much improved qualitatively. Four Eagles were named to the all-MAC eastern team: Al-Rajaan, junior defender Kenny Davidson, junior midfielder Mark (Lowenstein) Grabow, and sophomore forward Alan Ross. (Kuykendall, Lowenstein and Ross would all play professionally in the NASL for the new Washington Diplomats after graduating.) However, the Darts moved to south Florida over the winter (where they would eventually be reborn as one of the key franchises of the NASL's glory years, the Fort Lauderdale Strikers) and Kerr's contract was sold to the New York Cosmos. Another coaching change was yet again in the works for the Eagles, but few could have guessed the 20 years of stability and unprecedented success (for AU athletics) that coach would bring.

=== The Mehlert era begins (1972–1973) ===
Pete Mehlert was born in Shanghai; raised in Hong Kong, London and Bethesda; and played soccer at Walter Johnson High School and Boston University, where the aggressive, combative—if undersized—midfielder was twice named to the All-New England region team. A year after graduating BU, he was hired as American's first full-time soccer coach. Inheriting four all-conference players, in 1972 he guided the Eagles to a 3–5 record against D1 competition, including two wins against conference foes (including the program's first-ever against 1961 NCAA champion West Chester thanks to a shutout by Kuykendall and a dramatic header by freshman forward Mark McDonough.) Senior forward Brian O’Neill, Kuykendall and Lowenstein all were named to the all-MAC University Division east team, with Lowenstein being named eastern section MVP.

The Eagles continued to improve in 1973 with their first-ever winning season against D1 competition and a .500 record against MAC conference foes, including road wins in Philadelphia against La Salle and Drexel. Al-Rajaan (as a fifth-year senior – he sat out the 1972 season for personal reasons), Kuykendall and Ross were again named to the MAC University Division eastern all-star team. In a move that would foreshadow his trademark penchant for lining up the best opposition in the country, Mehlert scheduled a year-end match under the lights at Washington & Lee High School in Arlington against St. Louis University—who had won the NCAA championship nine of the previous 14 seasons and would win their tenth a few weeks later. Despite outshooting the Eagles 26–8, the Billikens only won 1–0 thanks to Kuykendall's 22 saves. In December he would be named an honorable mention all-American. The capstone to Kuykendall's collegiate career would occur in January 1974, when the NASL expansion Washington Diplomats drafted him with the #2 overall pick.

While the Mehlert era was off to a great start, big changes loomed: In 1973, the NCAA created its current three division structure. For 1974, 12 of the 13 MAC University Division schools (all except Gettysburg) decided to form their own new multi-sport Division I conference—the East Coast Conference—rather than continue in the MAC's multi-division structure. (The rest of the MAC would shortly move to Division III status.) How would AU adjust? And how would Mehlert replace the best player in school history to date in the critical position guarding the nets?

=== New conference, familiar foes (1974–1976) ===
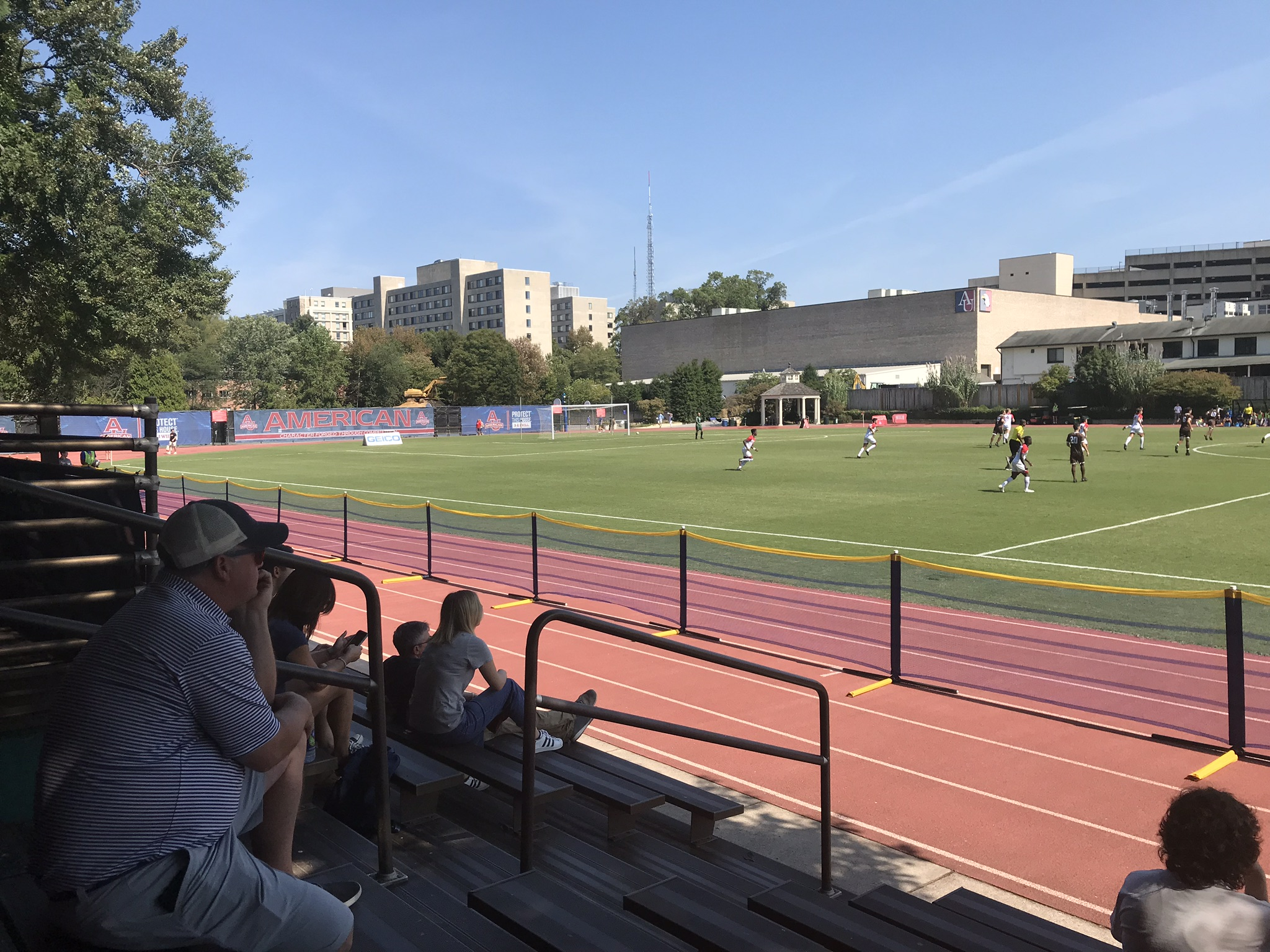
Reeves Field during an American game against Lehigh in September 2019

The East Coast Conference (ECC) retained the MAC University Division's east–west sectional alignment—which reflected more of a big market-small market division than geography, with West Chester moving into the West Division (along with Bucknell, Delaware, Lafayette, Lehigh and Rider) and AU remaining in the East with the four Philadelphia schools (Drexel, La Salle, St. Joseph's and Temple) and Long Island-based Hofstra. But not wanting to lose such a high-quality regular opponent, Mehlert would continue to schedule the Golden Rams until they would eventually leave Division I in 1982. The 1974 season would also see AU's first game against the University of Maryland, a 2–3 loss in College Park, beginning another top-notch annual local rivalry. Unhappy with his three candidates to succeed Kuykendall at goalkeeper, Mehlert asked senior midfielder John Rachlin to try the position after watching him “fooling around” in the nets during practice. Despite not having ever previously played the position in a competitive game, Rachlin would help the Eagles attain a 3–4–2 record against D1 opponents and a 1–2–2 mark in the ECC East, beating West Chester at home and earning shutouts against Hofstra on the road in his first win and Georgetown at home to end the season. After a shaky start that included AU's first loss to local rival George Washington in 6 years, the selfless Rachlin earned enthusiastic support from his teammates and praise from Mehlert.

There are many differences in the rules of college soccer compared to the professional and international game, including the ability of substituted players to re-enter the game (with certain limitations) and a game-clock that counts in the wrong direction (backwards). Another critical difference is the treatment of regular-season ties, which the NCAA over the decades has tried various ways to resolve, using overtime periods of different durations under both timed and sudden-death rules. If college soccer was played like soccer in the rest of the world, the Eagles would have been undefeated against D1 opponents in 1975, but officially were 5–2–3 (thanks to a 1–2–3 record in their 6 overtime games, including a heartbreaking own-goal loss to West Chester on the road and a home overtime loss to Temple—the closest the Eagles had come to beating the traditional-powerhouse Owls in 10 tries). They also had their first-ever winning record in conference play, going 3–1–1 including their first win over St. Joseph's (they were previously 0–7–2 against the Hawks). Junior goalkeeper Jack Cassell (a name very familiar to the AU community) brought stability in the nets for the Eagles, recording four shutouts against D1 opponents. In recognition of their most-successful season to date, four Eagles were named to the all-ECC East Division team: defender Ted Nussdorfer (junior), midfielder Mbakiso "Reggie" Dambe (senior), and forwards Alex Chambers (senior) and Aidan Cunningham (freshman).

The 1976 season would see the Eagles continue to play very competitive soccer under Coach Mehlert, going 6–4–1 against D1 opponents and 2–3 in the ECC East. The schedule would see AU compete in its first-ever regular-season tournament, the Old Dominion Classic hosted by ODU, in which the Eagles tied Princeton 1–1 in their first game against an Ivy League foe, and defeated East Carolina in overtime 7–3 thanks to a 4-goal explosion in less than 12 minutes by senior forward Chuck Banknell, giving him an AU D1-record 5-goal performance. Senior goalkeeper Cassell suffered a separated shoulder in an early-season loss to La Salle, opening the door for sophomore transfer Tony Vecchione (from Montclair State) to post two shutouts in a 3-day period. Vecchione would share the position with Cassell after his return from injury and go on to become one of the great AU ‘keepers and later coach local rival George Washington. As a defunct conference, the ECC’s archival records are difficult to find for verification, but AU records say that at least freshman midfielder Luis Calderon was named to the all-ECC's East Division team.

=== Welcome to the post-season! (1977–1979) ===
The 1977 season would be a streaky one, but ultimately prove the most successful in AU history to date. The Eagles won their first division championship thanks to two 1–0 overtime victories over Temple; one at Reeves Field, the other a playoff game in Philadelphia that served as the tie-breaker for the two schools' identical 4–1 conference records. Making the accomplishment all the more impressive was the Eagles’ previous 0–11 record against the Owls since turning D1 in 1966. Both winning goals were scored by senior transfer Rolf Neitzel—who had previously attended Montgomery College and the Naval Academy and would emerge as AU's most dangerous scoring threat—on crosses by the Eagles’ outstanding midfielders: sophomore Calderon (in the regular-season game) and junior Cunningham (in the playoff game). Other highlights included: a return to Old Dominion's tournament, where AU lost to Long Island University before ending their early 0–3 start against D1 opponents with a victory against Virginia Military Institute; the beginning of another new local rivalry, this time against 1971 and 1974 NCAA champion Howard University (the Eagles lost to the Bison 1–3 at home); 5 shutouts against D1 opponents by junior goalkeeper Vecchione; and a 5-game midseason winning streak. To end the season, the Eagles would face West Division champion West Chester in the ECC title game. The 1–2 home loss to the Golden Rams was disappointing considering the Eagles had beaten them on the road 3–0 earlier in the season, but Neitzel suffered a head injury and West Chester was the hungrier team and outplayed AU. Neitzel, Cunningham and senior defender Garn Anderson were all named to the all-ECC East Division team as AU finished with an 8–8 record against D1 opponents. But a sense of unfinished business from 1977 would fuel Mehlert and the returning Eagles to greater heights over the next two seasons.

It would be a year of firsts for the Eagles in 1978: the beginning of another local rivalry with new Division I entrant George Mason University (setting the tone for that intense rivalry with a 0–0 tie against the Patriots in Fairfax), going undefeated at home against D1 competition (6–0), and AU's first-ever NCAA tournament appearance in any team sport thanks to an at-large bid—despite not winning the ECC title but posting an 8–4–1 regular-season record against D1 opponents. The modest freshman forward Kevin Barth picked up where Neitzel left off the previous season, with his head emerging as the most dangerous part of the Eagles’ offense. Vecchione had 6 shutouts against D1 competition, including three straight to end the regular season. The Eagles avenged their 1977 ECC title-game loss with a 3–0 victory over West Chester at Reeves Field, but their inability to beat Philadelphia nemeses Temple and St. Joseph's on the road left them with a 3–2 conference record and out of contention for the conference championship. The NCAA tournament selection committee, however, would deem them worthy of a chance for a national title. But the Eagles seemed outmatched and a bit overwhelmed on the road against undefeated Clemson, losing 0–4. (Clemson would finally fall in the College Cup, losing to national champion San Francisco in the semifinals). Junior Calderon and freshman Barth were named to the all-ECC East Division team (and others may have as well; ECC records are difficult to locate). The experience of playing in the NCAA tournament would help shape an even-more successful season in 1979, but the Eagles would first have to replace the graduating Vecchione in the nets.

Returning every starter other than Vecchione from its first-ever NCAA tournament team, the Eagles had high hopes for 1979. But after three games against D1 opponents AU was only 0–2–1, falling at home to Navy in overtime (kicking off yet another new annual regional rivalry), tying the University of North Carolina-Chapel Hill at a tournament hosted by Division III Lynchburg College, and losing at home to Maryland. That would be last Eagles loss in the regular season, however, as they went 10–0–2 the rest of the way including home ties against Temple and Howard, compiling a 4–0–1 record to tie the Owls for first place in the East Division. Mehlert started platooning junior college transfer Bill Ruvo (Burlington County, NJ) in goal with returning junior ‘keeper Eric Berezin after Ruvo recovered from a fractured ankle suffered the second day of practice, and Ruvo would claim the position after Berezin was lost to a broken wrist 5 games into the streak. Against D1 teams, Ruvo would finish 10–2–1 with 7 shutouts, including 5 in a row. American would take the ECC East crown from Temple on penalty kicks after a 0–0 tie in Philadelphia, and crushed Rider 3–0 in the conference title game at Reeves Field. In the first round of the NCAA tournament, AU prevailed 1–0 in Charlottesville in their first-ever match against the University of Virginia, as freshman forward Mark DeBlois scored his team-leading 12th goal on a free kick from sophomore midfielder Billy Hylton. Unfortunately for the Eagles, as in 1978, Clemson was lurking in the next round—this time the quarterfinals. Thought they played a much closer match than the previous year, AU fell 0–1 to the Tigers on the road. DeBlois, senior midfielders Calderon and Doug Dugan, and junior midfielder Eduardo Lopez (a transfer from William & Mary where he was a two-time NCAA all-South region team selection) were all named to the all-ECC East Division team. To this day, 1979 (12–3–4 overall against D1 teams) stands as one of the three most-successful seasons in AU soccer history. But the Eagles would graduate 7 seniors (Calderon would be the 75th overall pick in the 1980 NASL Draft by the New England Tea Men, who shortly moved to Jacksonville), including key reserve defender Keith Tabatznik, who would go on to become the head coach at Georgetown (joining Vecchione as the second Eagle alum recruited to coach a local rival), posing the need for recruiting and rebuilding before they could continue their ascent to the heights of college soccer.

=== Conference affiliations ===
The soccer team has played in several conferences, detailed below:

Period	Conference
1949-66	Mason–Dixon
1967-1973	Middle Atlantic
1974-1983	East Coast
1984	Eastern Athletic
1985-2000	Colonial Athletic
2001-Present	Patriot League

== Players ==
=== Current roster ===
As of 19 Sep 2024

Note: Flags indicate national team as defined under FIFA eligibility rules; some limited exceptions apply. Players may hold more than one non-FIFA nationality.

No.	Pos.	Nation	Player
0	GK	USA	Juan Carlos Alvarez
1	GK	USA	Dominic Dominguez
2	DF	USA	Jonah Fogel
3	DF	CAN	Rex-Emmanuel Cobbina
4	DF	AUS	Cooper Nunn
5	DF	USA	Nicholas Shirley
6	DF	JPN	Taku Takahashi
7	MF	USA	Miles Lam
8	MF	GER	Tim Schliemann
9	FW	USA	Sam Hershey
10	FW	CMR	Dilane Zouantcha
11	MF	USA	Zemi Rodriguez
12	MF	USA	Moad Ezzahir

No.	Pos.	Nation	Player
13	DF	USA	Ian Webb-Johnson
15	MF	USA	Kobe Keomany
16	MF	USA	Sebastian Garces
17	MF	USA	Reyes Parra
18		USA	Leo Palomo
19	FW	USA	Colin O'Brien
20	FW	USA	Mustapha Sowe
21	MF	USA	Jared Weber
22	MF	USA	Toshi Davis
23	MF	USA	Ethan Boyle
24	DF	USA	Owen Edsell
25	MF	USA	Chris Sullivan
32	GK	USA	Matthew Tibbetts

== Coaching staff ==
As of 19 Sep 2024

Position	Name
Head coach	Zach Samol
Assistant coach	Patrick Mehlert
Assistant coach	Zach Weidman
Assistant coach	Nicolas Blassou

== Post-season honors ==
Final national rankings

- 2001: #14 in coaches poll
- 1997: #5 in coaches poll/ #8 in media poll
- 1985: #5 in coaches poll/ #8 in media poll
- 1984: #18 in media poll
- 1979: #14 in coaches poll

National awards

Player of the Year:

- 1985: Michael Brady (ISAA coaches award and Soccer America media award—the Hermann Trophy went to Duke's Tom Kain)

Coach of the Year:

- 1985: Pete Mehlert

All-Americans:

- 1997: Second Team - Forward Scott Pearson
- 1985: First Team - Forward Michael Brady; Second Team - Defender Keith Trehy
- 1984: Second Team - Forward Michael Brady
- 1983: First Team - Midfielder Michael Brady
- 1973: Honorable Mention - Goalkeeper Kurt Kuykendall

Conference awards

- 2026: Patriot League Defender of the Year: Ian Webb-Johnson
- 2025: Patriot League Midfielder of the Year - Troy Elgersma; Goalkeeper of the Year - Matthew Tibbetts; Coach of the Year - Zach Samol
- 2024: Patriot League Offensive Player of the Year - Forward Troy Elgersma
- 2020: Patriot League Tournament MVP - Forward David Coly
- 2016: Patriot League Offensive Player of the Year - Midfielder Panos Nakhid; Midfielder of the Year - Dale Ludwig
- 2012: Patriot League Defensive Player of the Year - Cristobal Soto; Goalkeeper of the Year - Billy Knutsen; Coach of the Year - Todd West
- 2011: Patriot League Coach of the Year - Todd West
- 2008: Patriot League Rookie of the Year - Goalkeeper Matt Makowski; Coach of the Year - Todd West
- 2005: Patriot League Rookie of the Year - Midfielder Phil Purdy
- 2004: Patriot League Offensive Player of the Year - Midfielder Shawn Kuykendall; Goalkeeper of the Year - Thomas Myers; Coach of the Year - Todd West; Tournament MVP - Midfielder Garth Juckem
- 2001: Patriot League Rookie of the Year - Forward Andrew Herman; Tournament MVP - Defender Bobby Brennan
- 1999: Colonial Athletic Association Rookie of the Year - Forward Nino Marcantonio
- 1997: Colonial Athletic Association Coach of the Year - Bob Jenkins
- 1986: Colonial Athletic Association Player of the Year - Keith Trehy
- 1985: Colonial Athletic Association Player of the Year - Michael Brady; Coach of the Year - Pete Mehlert
- 1984: Colonial Athletic Association Player of the Year - Michael Brady; Coach of the Year - Pete Mehlert
- 1983: East Coast Conference East Player of the Year - Michael Brady
- 1979: East Coast Conference East Co-MVPs - Luis Calderon and Eduardo Lopez
- 1972: Middle Atlantic Conference University Division East MVP - Midfielder Mark (Lowenstein) Grabow

Patriot League (2001–present) first team:

- 2026: Defender Ian Webb-Johnson
- 2025: Forward Mustapha Sowe, Midfielder Troy Elgersma, Defender Jonah Fogel, Goalkeeper Matthew Tibbetts
- 2024: Forward Troy Elgersma, Defender Cooper Nunn
- 2023: Forward Sam Hershey, Midfielder Zemi Rodriguez, Defender Mike Bleeker
- 2021: Forward David Coly, Defender Nicolas Blassou
- 2016: Midfielders Dale Ludwig and Panos Nakhid, Defender Michael Cherry
- 2015: Midfielders Dale Ludwig, Panos Nakhid and Liam Robley
- 2014: Midfielder Liam Robley, Defender Jake Weinreb
- 2012: Forward Dale McDonald, Midfielder Colin Seigfreid, Defender Cristobal Soto, Goalkeeper Billy Knutsen
- 2011: Forward Alassane Kane, Midfielder Ryan Morales, Defenders Adem Gokturk and Cristobal Soto
- 2010: Midfielder Jamie Davin
- 2009: Forward Mike Warden, Midfielder Nick Kapus, Defender Cooper Bryant
- 2008: Midfielder Phil Purdy, Defenders Cooper Bryant and Karsten Smith
- 2006: Midfielder Sal Caccavale
- 2005: Midfielder Sal Caccavale
- 2004: Midfielders Sal Caccavale and Shawn Kuykendall, Defender Charlie Konover, Goalkeeper Thomas Myers
- 2002: Forward Andrew Herman, Midfielder Kris Kuykendall, Defender Larry McDonald
- 2001: Forward Adam Rosen, Midfielders Kris Bertsch and Kris Kuykendall, Defenders Bobby Brennan and Larry McDonald

Colonial Athletic Association (1984–2000) first team:

- 2000: Forward Nino Marcantonio
- 1998: Forward Scott Weber, Midfielder Trevor Ellis
- 1997: Forward Scott Pearson, Midfielder Antonio Otero, Defenders Stephen Franzke and Avery John
- 1996: Forward Scott Pearson, Defender Avery John
- 1995: Forward Scott Pearson
- 1994: Forward Andrew Graham
- 1993: Midfielder Diego Rebagliati
- 1992: Midfielder Diego Rebagliati
- 1991: Defender Brad Atkins
- 1990: Forward Jon Hall, Defender Raj Lalchan
- 1989: Forward Jon Hall, Defender Andrew Kress
- 1988: Defender John Diffley
- 1987: Forward Stephen Marland, Defender John Diffley
- 1986: Midfielder David Nakhid, Defender Keith Trehy
- 1985: Forward Michael Brady, Midfielder David Nakhid, Defenders Troy Regis and Keith Trehy
- 1984: Forward Michael Brady, Defender Keith Trehy, Goalkeeper Steve Giordano

East Coast Conference Eastern Division (1974–1983) first team:

- 1983: Forward Tommy Kramer, Midfielder Michael Brady, Defenders Paul Tarricone and Keith Trehy
- 1982: Midfielder Michael Brady, Goalkeeper Steve Giordano
- 1980: Midfielders Richie Burke and Eduardo Lopez
- 1979: Forwards Luis Calderon and Mark DeBlois, Midfielders Doug Dugan and Eduardo Lopez
- 1978: Forward Kevin Barth, Midfielder Luis Calderon
- 1977: Forward Rolf Neitzel, Midfielder Luis Calderon
- 1976: Midfielder Luis Calderon
- 1975: Forward Alex Chambers, Midfielders Aidan Cunningham and Reggie Dambe, Defender Ted Nussdorfer

Middle Atlantic Conference University Division eastern section (1967-1973) first team:

- 1973: Forward Fahad Al-Rajaan, Midfielder Alan Ross, Goalkeeper Kurt Kuykendall
- 1972: Forward Brian O'Neill, Midfielder Mark (Lowenstein) Grabow, Goalkeeper Kurt Kuykendall
- 1971: Forwards Fahad Al-Rajaan and Alan Ross, Midfielder Mark (Lowenstein) Grabow, Defender Ken Davidson
- 1969: Forward Fahad Al-Rajaan, Defender Jeff Wood

Mason-Dixon Conference (1949-1966) first team:

- 1959: Midfielder Naran Ivanchukov
- 1958: Midfielder Naran Ivanchukov

== AU alumni in the pros and international soccer ==
Eleven AU alumni so far have appeared in a Major League Soccer (MLS) or North American Soccer League (NASL) game:

- Defender Avery John played in 70 games from 2004 to 2009 with the New England Revolution and D.C. United. He also played in 75 games over 4 seasons from 1999 to 2003 with Irish first division clubs Bohemians, Shelbourne and Longford Town.
- Midfielder Antonio Otero played in 25 games with D.C. United from 1999 to 2000. He was a Generation Adidas amateur signee with MLS in 1999 and assigned to D.C. United.
- Defender John Diffley played in only 19 games from 1996 to 1997 with the Tampa Bay Mutiny and Sporting Kansas City at the end of his career because there was no US first division league after he graduated in 1989 until MLS was launched in 1996. Tampa Bay selected him with the 27th pick in the MLS inaugural player draft.
- Midfielder David Nakhid played in 18 games in 1998 with the Revolution. He also played in 83 games over 4 seasons in European first division domestic leagues from 1990 to 1994: 42 matches with former Belgian first division club KSV Waragem from 1990 to 1992, and 41 with Swiss first division club Grasshoppers from 1992 to 1994. As a 1987 graduate, his playing career was also impacted by the lack of a top-level US pro league from 1985 to 1995.
- Goalkeeper Kurt Kuykendall played in 15 games from 1974 to 1976 with the Washington Diplomats and New York Cosmos. The Diplomats selected him with the second pick in the 1974 draft.
- Midfielder Troy Elgersma is actively playing for the Los Angeles Galaxy in 2026.
- Midfielder Mark (Lowenstein) Grabow played in 3 games with the Diplomats in 1976.
- Midfielder Shawn Kuykendall played in 2 games with D.C. United in 2005. He was selected by D.C. United with the 96th pick in the 2005 draft.
- Midfielder Sal Caccavale played in 1 game with the New York Red Bulls in 2007. He was selected by the Red Bulls with the 71st pick in the 2007 draft.
- Defender Chris Brown played in 1 game with FC Dallas in 1998.
- Midfielder Alan Ross played in 1 game with the Diplomats in 1975.

Although they never played in a US first division game, another four AU alumni were selected in the NASL and MLS drafts: defender Bobby Brennan was the 42nd pick in the 2002 draft by D.C. United, goalkeeper Michael Behonick was the 51st pick in the 2003 draft by D.C. United, goalkeeper Billy Knutsen was the 74th pick in the 2014 draft by the San Jose Earthquakes, and midfielder Luis Calderon was the 75th pick of the 1980 draft by the New England Tea Men. Although undrafted, midfielder Doug Dugan was a member of the Washington Diplomats for their 1980 season but did not appear in a regular season match, and forward Scott Pearson dressed for a 1999 game for an injury-depleted D.C. United team but did not play. Forward Peter Philipakos also played in 3 Greek first division games with Olympiacos FC in the 2004–2005 season.

Some of the Eagles’ most-recognized players from the 1980s did not have the opportunity to play first-division soccer in the U.S., as the NASL was in its death throes for the first half of the decade, and from 1985 to 1995 there was no first-division domestic league. Diffley (30 games), Nakhid (13 games), Calderon (7 games) and another nine AU alumni played in the various leagues that were predecessors to the eventual US second-division A-League after the founding of MLS, including the Western Soccer Alliance (WSA), American Soccer League (ASL III), and American Professional Soccer League (APSL). The other nine are forwards Scott Snyder (57 games), Michael Brady (55 games), and Abdulwhab Al-Khaldi (20 games); midfielders Adrian Gaitan (41 games), Fernando Iturbe (16 games) and Richie Burke (6 games); defenders Keith Trehy (36 games) and Troy Regis (1 game); and goalkeeper Stephen Pfeil (7 games). Undoubtedly some of them would have played at the first-division level in the US if one existed at the time.

During this dark period in American soccer history, indoor soccer offered the highest professional level of the game in the U.S. Brady (74 games) and Nakhid (14 games) both also played for the Baltimore Blast in the Major Indoor Soccer League (MISL), Burke (6 games) for the Washington Warthogs in its successor Continental Indoor Soccer League (CISL), and Diffley (22 games) for the Atlanta Attack, Hershey Impact and Wichita Wings in the National Professional Soccer League (NPSL), its competitor league. Chris Brown was selected by the Dayton Dynamo with the 5th overall pick in the 1993 NPSL Draft. Trehy was selected by Dallas Sidekicks with the 9th overall pick in the 1987 MISL Draft, Nakhid by the Baltimore Blast with the 13th overall pick in 1987, and Brady by the Kansas City Comets with the 29th overall pick in 1986.

Two AU alumni have represented the US in senior international soccer: Diffley, who earned 7 caps in 1988 (and was first alternate for the US Olympic Team that year), and Brady (who was born in Chicago to Irish parents before moving to England as an infant) who earned 3 from 1984 to 1985. John earned 65 caps for Trinidad and Tobago; David Nakhid earned 35 for the Soca Warriors.

== NCAA tournament appearances ==
- Division I tournament: 1978, 1979, 1984, 1985, 1997, 2001, 2002, 2004, 2020

== Titles ==
=== Conference ===
Tournament

- ECC (1): 1979
- CAA (2): 1997
- Patriot League (3): 2001, 2004, 2020

Regular season

- ECC (4): 1977^{1}, 1979, 1982, 1983
- ECAC (1): 1984^{1}
- CAA (1): 1985^{1}
- Patriot League (7): 2004^{1}, 2005^{1}, 2008^{1}, 2011, 2012, 2016, 2025

key

- ^{1}co-champion (title shared)
