= UNC Wilmington Seahawks men's soccer =

American college soccer team

- Founded: 1966; 60 years ago
- University: University of North Carolina Wilmington
- Head coach: Aidan Heaney (22nd season)
- Conference: CAA
- Location: Wilmington, North Carolina, US
- Stadium: UNCW Soccer Stadium (capacity: 5,000)
- Nickname: Hawks, UNCW
- Colors: Teal, gold, and navy
Home	Away

NCAA tournament Round of 32
- 2009, 2014, 2017

NCAA tournament appearances
- 2009, 2014, 2017, 2018

Conference tournament championships
- 2009

Conference Regular Season championships
- 2008, 2009, 2014, 2019

The UNCW Seahawks men's soccer team is a varsity intercollegiate athletic team of University of North Carolina Wilmington in Wilmington, North Carolina, United States. The team is a member of the Colonial Athletic Association, which is part of the National Collegiate Athletic Association's Division I. UNCW's first men's soccer team was fielded in 1966. The team plays its home games at the UNCW Soccer Stadium in Wilmington. The Seahawks are coached by Aidan Heaney.

== NCAA Tournament appearances ==
UNCW has appeared in three NCAA Tournaments. Its first appearance came in 2009. Their most recent came in 2018.

Season	Date	Round	Opponent	Result	Location
2009	November 19	First round	Charlotte	T 1–1 (Note: UNCW won 4–1 on penalties.)	Charlotte, North Carolina
2009	November 22	Second round	#3 Wake Forest	L 1–2	Winston-Salem, North Carolina
2014	November 20	First round	Bucknell	W 2–0	Wilmington, North Carolina
2014	November 23	Second round	#16 Virginia	L 1–3	Charlottesville, Virginia
2017	November 16	First round	Presbyterian	W 1–0 (OT)	Wilmington, North Carolina
2017	November 19	Second round	#3 North Carolina	L 1–2	Chapel Hill, North Carolina
2018	November 15	First round	Furman	T 0-0	Wilmington, North Carolina

== Achievements ==
- CAA Men's Soccer Tournament: 1
  - Champion : 2009
  - Runner-Up: 2017
- CAA Regular Season: 3
  - Champion : 2008, 2009, 2014
  - Runner-Up: 2017
