= Drexel Dragons men's soccer =

American college soccer team

- Founded: 1947; 79 years ago
- University: Drexel University
- Head coach: David Castellanos (1st season)
- Conference: CAA
- Location: Philadelphia, Pennsylvania, US
- Stadium: Vidas Field (capacity: 1,500)
- Nickname: Dragons
- Colors: Navy blue and gold
Home	Away

Pre-tournament ISFA/ISFL championships
- 1958

NCAA tournament appearances
- 1963, 1972, 2012, 2013

Conference tournament championships
- 2013

Conference regular season championships
- 1955, 1956, 1958, 1960, 1961, 1995, 2012, 2013

The Drexel Dragons men's soccer team represents Drexel University. The team is a member of the Coastal Athletic Association of the National Collegiate Athletic Association.

In 1955, the team finished with a record of 11-3-1 and won the Middle Atlantic Conferences (MAC) championship for the first time. After finishing the regular season tied for first place in the conference's Southeastern division, they won a one-game playoff against Bucknell, and then went on to defeat Rutgers in the conference championship game.

In 1958 with a 12-0-0 record, the team was awarded the National Championship by the Intercollegiate Soccer Football Association of America, then the governing body of men's college soccer. This occurred the year before the NCAA instituted a playoff system and so Drexel's championship is not officially recognized today by the NCAA.

== See also ==
- 1958 Drexel Dragons men's soccer team
- Category:Drexel Dragons men's soccer players
