= Delaware Fightin' Blue Hens men's soccer =

American college soccer team

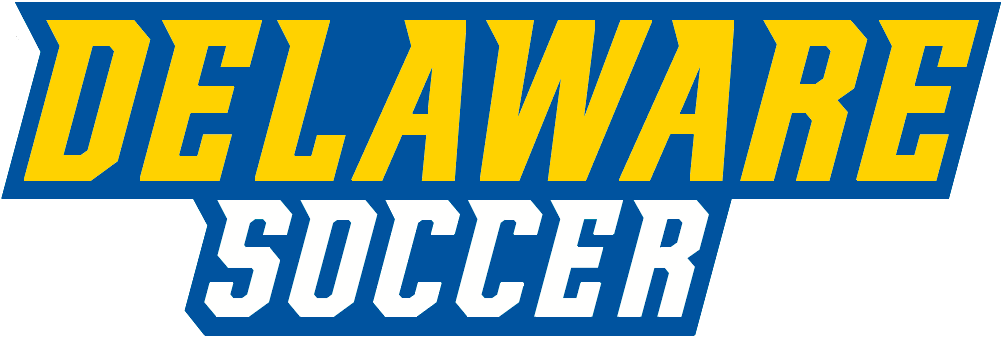
- Founded: 1926; 100 years ago
- University: University of Delaware
- Head coach: Ian Hennessy (7th season)
- Conference: The Summit
- Location: Newark, Delaware, US
- Stadium: Stuart and Grant Stadium (capacity: 2,500)
- Nickname: Hens, Fightin' Blue Hens
- Colors: Royal blue and gold
Home	Away

NCAA tournament Round of 16
- 1968

NCAA tournament appearances
- 1968, 1970, 2011, 2013, 2016

Conference tournament championships
- 1968, 1970, 2011, 2016

Conference Regular Season championships
- 1968, 1969, 1970, 2014

The Delaware Fightin' Blue Hens men's soccer team represents the University of Delaware in all men's college soccer competitions. The Blue Hens have enjoyed a resurgence in conference and national prominence in the last 2 years under head coach Ian Hennessy. The team qualified and lost in the semi-finals of the CAA in 2010 before winning its first ever conference championship in 2011. The 2011 team defeated the University of Virginia in the NCAA first round before succumbing to Final Four participant UCLA in the second round. The team's previous apex of success came in the late 1960s and early 1970s, when the Blue Hens qualified into the 1968 and 1970 editions of the NCAA Division I Men's Soccer Championship, their only appearances in the tournament to date.

On November 13, 2011, the Blue Hens earned their first-ever CAA Tournament Championship, thus earning their first berth into the NCAA tournament in 41 years. The team also clinched an NCAA at-large berth in 2013, finishing the season with a record of 14-4-1, and hosted the program's first ever NCAA tournament match in a 2-1 OT loss to St. John's.

The Blue Hens will depart the CAA for the Summit League on July 1, 2025, following the full athletic department move to Conference USA.
