= 2019 Colonial Athletic Association men's soccer season =

- League: NCAA Division I
- Sport: Soccer
- Duration: August 30, 2019 – November 2, 2019
- Teams: 10

2020 MLS SuperDraft
- Top draft pick: Danny Reynolds, 35th overall
- Picked by: Seattle Sounders FC

Regular Season
- Season champions: UNCW
- Runners-up: James Madison
- Season MVP: Offensive: Manuel Ferriol; Defensive: Danny Reynolds; Rookie: Timothy Ennin

Tournament
- Champions: James Madison
- Runners-up: UNCW
- Finals MVP: Niclas Mohr

CAA men's soccer seasons
- ← 2018 2020 →

2019 Colonial Athletic Association men's soccer standings
	Conf.					Overall
Team	W		L		T	W		L		T
UNCW	7	–	0	–	1	12	–	5	–	2
James Madison ‡	5	–	2	–	1	12	–	7	–	2
Hofstra	5	–	2	–	1	10	–	7	–	2
William & Mary	4	–	2	–	2	7	–	9	–	2
Northeastern	3	–	3	–	2	6	–	9	–	3
Delaware	2	–	4	–	2	3	–	9	–	3
Elon	2	–	6	–	0	7	–	9	–	1
Drexel	1	–	5	–	1	6	–	9	–	2
Charleston	1	–	7	–	1	2	–	12	–	1
‡ – 2019 CAA Tournament champion + – Invited to the 2019 NCAA tournament; As of 32 November 2019; Rankings from United Soccer Coaches

The 2019 Colonial Athletic Association men's soccer season was the 37th season of men's varsity soccer in the conference. The regular season began on August 30, 2019 and concluded on November 2, 2019.

The regular season culminated with the 2019 CAA Men's Soccer Tournament, which will began on November 8 and concluded on November 16, 2019.

UNCW won the CAA regular season championship, while James Madison won the CAA Tournament championship. James Madison earned the CAA's lone berth into the NCAA Tournament, where they were eliminated in the opening round.

== Background ==
The 2018 season began in August 2018 and concluded in November 2018. The regular season and tournament champions were James Madison, who finished the season with a conference record of 5–1–0 and a regular season and conference tournament record of 12–4–3. As 2018 CAA Men's Soccer Tournament champions, James Madison earned the conference's automatic bid into the 2018 NCAA Division I Men's Soccer Tournament. In addition to James Madison, UNCW earned an at-large berth into the NCAA Tournament. UNCW finished the regular season in second place and reached the semifinals of the CAA Tournament.

In the NCAA Tournament, both James Madison and UNCW entered in the first round. UNCW ultimately lost in the first round at home to Furman on penalty kicks, while James Madison reached the quarterfinals of the tournament, the best performance in program history. The Dukes defeated No. 16 High Point, No. 4 North Carolina, and No. 9 Virginia Tech – all on the road. In the quarterfinals, the Dukes played at No. 5 Michigan State. In the Elite Eight matchup, James Madison scored the opening goal in the 32nd minute from follow up shot by Niclas Mohr. The Dukes held the lead against the Spartans until the 72nd minute, where Ryan Sierakowski notched the match-tying goal through a lower-right corner shot. Sierakowski scored the go-ahead goal for Michigan State in the 81st minute, giving Michigan State their first College Cup berth since 1968, and preventing James Madison from reaching the College Cup.

== Preseason ==
=== Preseason poll ===
The preseason poll was released on August 22, 2019.

	Team	Ranking	First place votes
1.	James Madison	61	5
2.	UNCW	60	4
3.	Hofstra	45	0
4.	William & Mary	43	0
5.	Delaware	28	0
6.	Elon	26	0
7.	Northeastern	23	0
8.	Drexel	22	0
9.	Charleston	16	0

=== Preseason national polls ===
The preseason national polls were released in July and August 2019.

	United; Soccer	CSN	Soccer; America	Top Drawer; Soccer
Charleston	—	—	—	—
Delaware	—	—	—	—
Drexel	—	—	—	—
Elon	—	—	—	—
Hofstra	—	RV	—	—
James Madison	17	11	12	24
Northeastern	—	—	—	—
UNCW	RV	RV	—	—
William & Mary	—	—	—	—

== Regular season ==
=== Early season tournaments ===
Team	Tournament	Finish
James Madison	Fairfield Inn JMU Invitational	2nd

=== Conference results ===
Color Key: Home • Away • Win • Loss • Draw • Postponed
Club	Match							
Club	1	2	3	4	5	6	7	8
Charleston Cougars (COC)	HOF	NE	W&M	DEL	UNCW	DRX	JMU	ELN
Charleston Cougars (COC)	0–3	2–4	0–2	0–0	0–1	2–0	1–3	1–4
Delaware Fightin' Blue Hens (DEL)	NE	UNCW	ELN	COC	JMU	W&M	HOF	DRX
Delaware Fightin' Blue Hens (DEL)	2–2	2–3	3–2	0–0	0–3	1–5 (Note: Rescheduled from September 6 to October 22 due to Hurricane Dorian.)	0–5	2–1
Drexel Dragons (DRX)	NE	W&M	JMU	ELN	HOF	COC	UNCW	DEL
Drexel Dragons (DRX)	1–2	2–1	1–3	2–1	1–1	0–2	1–3	1–2
Elon Phoenix (ELN)	JMU	HOF	DEL	DRX	W&M	NE	COC	UNCW
Elon Phoenix (ELN)	0–6	2–3	2–3	1–2	1–2	3–1	4–1	0–1
Hofstra Pride (HOF)	JMU	COC	ELN	UNCW	DRX	W&M	DEL	NE
Hofstra Pride (HOF)	0–2	3–0	3–2	2–3	1–1	3–1	5–0	3–0
James Madison Dukes (JMU)	HOF	ELN	DRX	NE	DEL	UNCW	COC	W&M
James Madison Dukes (JMU)	2–0	6–0	3–1	3–3	3–0	0–1	3–1	2–3
Northeastern Huskies (NE)	DRX	DEL	COC	UNCW	JMU	ELN	W&M	HOF
Northeastern Huskies (NE)	2–1	2–2	4–2	1–3	3–3	1–3	2–0	0–3
UNCW Seahawks (UNCW)	W&M	DEL	NE	HOF	COC	JMU	DRX	ELN
UNCW Seahawks (UNCW)	1–1	3–2	3–1	3–2	1–0	1–0	3–1	1–0
William & Mary Tribe (W&M)	UNCW	DRX	COC	ELN	HOF	DEL	NE	JMU
William & Mary Tribe (W&M)	1–1	1–2	2–0	2–1	1–3	5–1	0–2	3–2

=== Positions by round ===
Team ╲ Round	1	2	3	4	5	6	7	8	9
UNCW	4	2	2	2	2	1	1	1	1
James Madison	1	1	1	1	1	2	2	2	2
Hofstra	7	4	4	5	5	4	4	3	3
William & Mary	5	6	5	4	3	3	3	4	4
Northeastern	2	3	3	3	4	5	6	5	5
Delaware	3	7	6	7	6	6	5	6	6
Elon	9	9	8	9	9	8	8	8	7
Drexel	6	5	7	6	7	7	7	7	8
Charleston	8	8	9	8	8	9	9	9	9

2019 CAA Men's Soccer Tournament semifinals
2019 CAA Men's Soccer Tournament quarterfinals
Eliminated

Source: CAAsports.com

=== CAA Players of the Week ===
Week	Offensive			Defensive			Rookie			Ref.
Week	Player	Position	Team	Player	Position	Team	Player	Position	Team	Ref.
Sep. 2	Christian Lauenborg	MF	Elon	Alex Ashton	GK	Hofstra	Frederik Rieper	DF	Hofstra	
Sep. 9	Tyler Clegg	MF	James Madison	Renan Thomazo	GK	Delaware	Gabriel Perrotta	GK	UNCW	
Sep. 16	Ryan Massoud	MF	Northeastern	Kieran Baskett	GK	William & Mary	Dennis Mensah	FW	James Madison	
Sep. 23	Manuel Ferriol	MF	James Madison	TJ Bush	GK	James Madison	Liam Murphy	MF	Northeastern	
Sep. 30	Manuel Ferriol	MF	James Madison	Sam Golan	DF	William & Mary	Nathan Messer	MF	William & Mary	
Oct. 7	Manuel Ferriol	MF	James Madison	Kieran Baskett	GK	William & Mary	Liam Murphy	MF	Northeastern	
Oct. 14	Alejandro Saez	FW	UNCW	Gabriel Perrotta	GK	UNCW	Alfredo Bozalongo	MF	William & Mary	
Oct. 21	Jacob Evans	FW	UNCW	Austin Shuping	GK	Charleston	Vemund Hole Vik	MF	Elon	
Oct. 28	Manuel Ferriol	MF	James Madison	Wilhelm Nilsson	DF	UNCW	Alfredo Bozalongo	MF	William & Mary	
Oct. 28	Matthew Vowinkel	FW	Hofstra	Wilhelm Nilsson	DF	UNCW	Alfredo Bozalongo	MF	William & Mary	
Nov. 4	Matthew Vowinkel	FW	Hofstra	Mark Lindstrom	DF	UNCW	Gabriel Perrotta	GK	UNCW	
Nov. 4	Phillip Goodrum	FW	UNCW	Mark Lindstrom	DF	UNCW	Gabriel Perrotta	GK	UNCW	

== Postseason ==
=== CAA Tournament ===
Semifinals; November 10
1	UNCW	2
4	William & Mary	1
2	James Madison (pen.)	1 (4)
3	Hofstra	1 (3)

CAA Championship; November 16
1	UNCW	0
2	James Madison (2OT)	1

=== NCAA Tournament ===
The NCAA Tournament will begin in November 2019 and conclude on December 17, 2019.

Seed	Region	School	1st Round	2nd Round	3rd Round	Quarterfinals	Semifinals	Championship
—	Charlottesville	James Madison	L 1–3 vs. Campbell – (Harrisonburg, VA)					

== Rankings ==
=== National rankings ===
	Improvement in ranking
	Drop in ranking
RV	Received votes but were not ranked in Top 25
NV	No votes received

		Pre	Wk 1	Wk 2	Wk 3	Wk 4	Wk 5	Wk 6	Wk 7	Wk 8	Wk 9	Wk 10	Wk 11	Wk 12	Wk 13	Wk 14	Wk 15	Wk 16	Final
Charleston	USC	NV	NV	NV	NV	NV	NV	NV	NV	NV	NV	NV	NV	NV	None released				NV
Charleston	TDS	NV	NV	NV	NV	NV	NV	NV	NV	NV	NV	NV	NV	NV	NV	NV	NV	NV	NV
Delaware	USC	NV	NV	NV	NV	NV	NV	NV	NV	NV	NV	NV	NV	NV	None released				NV
Delaware	TDS	NV	NV	NV	NV	NV	NV	NV	NV	NV	NV	NV	NV	NV	NV	NV	NV	NV	NV
Drexel	USC	NV	NV	NV	NV	NV	NV	NV	NV	NV	NV	NV	NV	NV	None released				NV
Drexel	TDS	NV	NV	NV	NV	NV	NV	NV	NV	NV	NV	NV	NV	NV	NV	NV	NV	NV	NV
Elon	USC	NV	NV	NV	NV	NV	NV	NV	NV	NV	NV	NV	NV	NV	None released				NV
Elon	TDS	NV	NV	NV	NV	NV	NV	NV	NV	NV	NV	NV	NV	NV	NV	NV	NV	NV	NV
Hofstra	USC	NV	RV	NV	NV	NV	NV	NV	NV	NV	NV	NV	RV	NV	None released				NV
Hofstra	TDS	NV	NV	RV	NV	NV	NV	NV	NV	NV	NV	NV	NV	NV	NV	NV	NV	NV	NV
James Madison	USC	17	RV	RV	RV	20	16	17	18	RV	21	25	RV	25	None released				RV
James Madison	TDS	24	24	NV	NV	RV	19	16	18	RV	NV	NV	NV	NV	NV	NV	NV	NV	NV
Northeastern	USC	NV	NV	NV	NV	RV	NV	NV	NV	NV	NV	NV	NV	NV	None released				NV
Northeastern	TDS	NV	NV	NV	NV	NV	NV	NV	NV	NV	NV	NV	NV	NV	NV	NV	NV	NV	NV
UNCW	USC	RV	NV	NV	NV	NV	NV	NV	RV	RV	RV	21	20	RV	None released				NV
UNCW	TDS	NV	NV	NV	NV	NV	NV	NV	NV	NV	NV	NV	NV	NV	NV	NV	NV	NV	NV
William & Mary	USC	NV	NV	NV	NV	NV	NV	NV	NV	NV	NV	NV	NV	NV	None released				NV
William & Mary	TDS	NV	NV	NV	NV	NV	NV	NV	NV	NV	NV	NV	NV	NV	NV	NV	NV	NV	NV

=== Regional rankings - USC Atlantic Region ===
	Improvement in ranking
	Drop in ranking
RV	Received votes but were not ranked in Top 10
NV	No votes received

The United Soccer Coaches Atlantic Region compares teams across the Atlantic Sun Conference, Colonial Athletic Association, and Patriot League.

	Wk 1	Wk 2	Wk 3	Wk 4	Wk 5	Wk 6	Wk 7	Wk 8	Wk 9	Wk 10	Wk 11	Wk 12
Charleston	NV	NV	NV	NV	NV	NV	NV	NV	NV	NV	NV	NV
Delaware	NV	NV	NV	NV	NV	NV	NV	NV	NV	NV	NV	NV
Drexel	NV	NV	NV	NV	NV	NV	NV	NV	NV	NV	NV	NV
Elon	NV	6	NV	NV	NV	NV	NV	NV	NV	NV	NV	NV
Hofstra	2	8	6	6	7	8	10	10	9	8	7	8
James Madison	RV	5	5	1	1	1	1	1	1	3	3	1
Northeastern	NV	NV	NV	9	8	5	8	NV	NV	NV	NV	NV
UNCW	NV	NV	10	8	5	3	3	2	2	1	1	3
William & Mary	NV	NV	NV	NV	NV	NV	NV	NV	NV	NV	NV	NV

== Awards and honors ==
=== Preseason honors ===
The preseason honors were announced on August 22, 2019.

Award	Recipients
Preseason Offensive Player of the Year	Phillip Goodrum, UNCW
Preseason Midfielder of the Year	Manuel Ferriol, James Madison
Preseason Defensive Player of the Year	Mark Lindstrom, UNCW
Preseason Goalkeeper of the Year	TJ Bush, James Madison
Preseason All-CAA Team	Chris Donovan, Drexel
Preseason All-CAA Team	Phillip Goodrum, UNCW
Preseason All-CAA Team	Matthew Vowinkel, Hofstra
Preseason All-CAA Team	Fernando Casero, James Madison
Preseason All-CAA Team	Manuel Ferriol, James Madison
Preseason All-CAA Team	Tucker Heffron, Charleston
Preseason All-CAA Team	Timo Hummrich, Delaware
Preseason All-CAA Team	Tom Judge, James Madison
Preseason All-CAA Team	Luke Matthews, Elon
Preseason All-CAA Team	Mark Lindstrom, UNCW
Preseason All-CAA Team	TJ Bush, James Madison

=== Postseason honors ===
2019 CAA Men's Soccer Individual Awards
Award	Recipient(s)
Player of the Year	Manuel Ferriol, James Madison
Coach of the Year	Aidan Heaney, UNCW
Defensive Player of the Year	Danny Reynolds, UNCW
Rookie of the Year	Timothy Ennin, Northeastern

2019 CAA Men's Soccer All-Conference Teams
First Team	Second Team	Third Team	Rookie Team
Chris Donovan, So., F, Drexel; Phillip Goodrum, Sr., F, UNCW; Matthew Vowinkel, Jr., F, Hofstra; Gabriel Cabral, Sr., M, UNCW; Fernando Casero, Sr., M, James Madison; Jacob Evans, Jr., M, UNCW; Manuel Ferriol, Sr., M, James Madison; Thomas Judge, Jr., D, James Madison; Mark Lindstrom, Sr., D, UNCW; Danny Reynolds, R-Sr., D, UNCW; TJ Bush, R-Jr., GK, James Madison	Benjamin Klingen, So., F, Northeastern; Julian Ngoh, Sr., F, William & Mary; Tucker Heffron, R-Sr., M, Charleston; Clay Obara, Fr., M, James Madison; Petter Soelberg, Jr., M, Hofstra; Luca Tausch, So., M, Hofstra; Melker Anshelm, So., D, James Madison; Brandon Clegg, Sr., D, James Madison; Timo Hummrich, So., D, Delaware; Wilhelm Nilsson, Sr., D, UNCW; George O’Malley, Jr., D, Hofstra; Gabriel Perrotta, Fr., GK, UNCW	Timothy Ennin, R-Fr., F, Northeastern; Tuki Tayali, R-Jr., F, Elon; Alfredo Bozalongo, Fr., M, William & Mary; Tyler Clegg, So., M, James Madison; Ryan Massoud, So., M, Northeastern; Jake Nicholson, Jr., M, Charleston; Oscar Ramsey, Sr., M, Hofstra; Sam Golan, Sr., D, William & Mary; Luke Matthews, Sr., D, Elon; Frederik Rieper, Fr., D, Hofstra; Alex Ashton, Gr., GK, Hofstra	Timothy Ennin, F, Northeastern; Alexander Levengood, F, William & Mary; Rex Twum, F, Delaware; Alfredo Bozalongo, M, William & Mary; Mattias Cooper, M, Elon; Clay Obara, M, James Madison; Colton Pleasants, M, UNCW; Kasper Lehm, D, Elon; Frederik Rieper, D, Hofstra; Gabriel Perrotta, GK, UNCW

=== Regional honors ===
2019 United Soccer Coaches All-Atlantic Region Teams
First Team	Second Team	Third Team
Thomas Judge, Jr., D, James Madison; Danny Reynolds, Sr, D, UNCW; Gabriel Cabral, Sr., M, UNCW; Manuel Ferriol, Sr., M, James Madison; Phillip Goodrum, Sr., F, UNCW	Mark Lindstrom, Sr., D, UNCW; Fernando Casero, Sr., M, James Madison; Chris Donovan, So., F, Drexel; Matthew Vowinkel, Jr., F, Hofstra	None

=== All-Americans ===
Consensus All-Americans
None

To earn "consensus" status, a player must win honors based on a point system computed from the four different all-America teams. The point system consists of three points for first team, two points for second team and one point for third team. No honorable mention or fourth team or lower are used in the computation. The top five totals plus ties are first team and the next five plus ties are second team.

College Soccer News	Soccer America	Top Drawer Soccer	United Soccer Coaches
First Team
Manu Ferriol – James Madison	None	None	None
Second Team
None	None	None	None
Third Team
None	None	Manu Ferriol – James Madison	None

== 2020 MLS Draft ==
The 2020 MLS SuperDraft will be held in January 2020.

=== Total picks by school ===
Team	Round 1	Round 2	Round 3	Round 4	Total
Charleston	–	–	–	–	–
Delaware	–	–	–	–	–
Drexel	–	–	–	–	–
Elon	–	–	–	–	–
Hofstra	–	–	–	–	–
James Madison	–	1	–	–	1
Northeastern	–	–	–	–	–
UNCW	–	1	1	–	2
William & Mary	–	–	–	–	–

=== List of selections ===
Rnd.	Pick	Player	Pos.	Team	School
2	35	Danny Reynolds	DF	Seattle Sounders	UNCW (Sr.)
2	40	Manu Ferriol	MF	FC Dallas	James Madison (Sr.)
3	75	Phillip Goodrum	FW	Atlanta United	UNCW (Sr.)

== Homegrown players ==
The Homegrown Player Rule is a Major League Soccer program that allows MLS teams to sign local players from their own development academies directly to MLS first team rosters. Before the creation of the rule in 2008, every player entering Major League Soccer had to be assigned through one of the existing MLS player allocation processes, such as the MLS SuperDraft.

To place a player on its homegrown player list, making him eligible to sign as a homegrown player, players must have resided in that club's home territory and participated in the club's youth development system for at least one year. Players can play college soccer and still be eligible to sign a homegrown contract.

No CAA players signed a homegrown contract ahead of the 2020 Major League Soccer season.
