= 2024 CAA men's soccer tournament =

- Classification: Division I
- Teams: 6
- Matches: 5
- Attendance: 2,479
- Site: Campus Sites (Higher Seed)
- Champions: Hofstra (8th title)
- Winning coach: Richard Nuttall (8th title)
- MVP: Laurie Goddard (Hofstra)
- Broadcast: FloSports

2024 Coastal Athletic Association men's soccer standings
	Conf.					Overall
Team	W		L		T	W		L		T
Elon	6	–	2	–	0	10	–	7	–	1
Drexel	5	–	2	–	1	9	–	6	–	2
Monmouth	4	–	1	–	3	8	–	2	–	6
No. 23 Hofstra ‡	5	–	3	–	0	14	–	5	–	2
Charleston	4	–	2	–	2	10	–	6	–	2
UNCW	4	–	4	–	0	6	–	9	–	5
Campbell	3	–	4	–	1	8	–	6	–	4
William & Mary	3	–	4	–	1	5	–	10	–	1
Northeastern	2	–	4	–	2	4	–	5	–	7
Delaware	2	–	6	–	0	7	–	7	–	2
Stony Brook	0	–	6	–	2	3	–	10	–	3
‡ – 2024 CAA tournament champion + – At-large invitation to the 2024 NCAA tournament; As of December 17, 2024; Rankings from United Soccer Coaches; Source: CAA

The 2024 CAA men's soccer tournament was the postseason men's soccer tournament for the Coastal Athletic Association held from November 7 through November 16, 2024. The five-match tournament took place at campus sites, with the higher seed hosting. The six-team single-elimination tournament consisted of three rounds based on seeding from regular season conference play. The defending champions were the Hofstra Pride. They were able to successfully defend their title, as the fourth seed, they won three games, including a defeat of sixth seed UNC Wilmington 1–0 in the Final. The conference tournament title was the eighth overall for the Hofstra men's soccer program all of which have come under head coach Richard Nuttall. This was the fourth straight year that Hofstra won the CAA tournament. As tournament champions, Hofstra earned the CAA's automatic berth into the 2024 NCAA Division I men's soccer tournament.

== Seeding ==
The top six teams in the regular season earned a spot in the 2024 tournament. Teams were seeded based on regular season conference record and tiebreakers were used to determine seedings of teams that finished with the same record. A tiebreaker was required for the third and fourth seed as Hofstra and Monmouth finished tied with fifteen regular season points each. Monmouth won the regular season meeting between the teams on September 21 by a score of 2–1. Therefore, Monmouth was the third seed and Hofstra was the fourth seed.

Seed	School	Conference Record	Points
1	Elon	6–2–0	18
2	Drexel	5–2–1	16
3	Monmouth	4–1–3	15
4	Hofstra	5–3–0	15
5	Charleston	4–2–2	14
6	UNC Wilmington	4–4–0	12

== Bracket ==
First Round; Thursday, November 7
4	Hofstra (a.e.t)	3
5	Charleston	2
3	Monmouth	1 (4)
6	UNC Wilmington (pen.)	1 (5)

Semifinals; Sunday, November 10
1	Elon	0
4	Hofstra	2
2	Drexel	0
6	UNC Wilmington	2

Final; Saturday, November 16
4	Hofstra	1
6	UNC Wilmington	0

== Schedule ==
=== First Round ===
November 7, 2024	#3 Monmouth	1–1 (a.e.t.) (4–5 p)	#6 UNC Wilmington	Philadelphia, PA
1:00 p.m. EST	Erik Reis 51'; Patrick Osiecki (yellow card) 77'; Jasen Bottini (yellow card) 103'; Olle Brorsson (yellow card) 110'	Report	(yellow card) 27' Team; (yellow card) 63' Osei Gymafi; (yellow card) 75' Cesare D'Amico; 81' Christian Acevedo; (yellow card) 90' Jack Clarkson	Stadium: Vidas Field; Attendance: 273; Referee: Shaun Papperman; Assistant referees: Alexander Tyshkevych; Juri Siskin; Fourth official: Andrew LaPlante
	Penalties
	Erik Reis (penalty scored); Olle Brorsson (penalty scored); Bastian Hatcher (penalty missed); Victor Andersson (penalty scored); Eryk Dymora (penalty scored); Arturo McConnochie (penalty missed); Brendan Tansey (penalty missed)		(penalty missed) Jack Clarkson; (penalty scored) Ethan Newsome; (penalty scored) Jake Shannon; (penalty scored) Christian Acevedo; (penalty scored) Cesare D'Amico; (penalty missed) Alex Hornada; (penalty scored) Caleb Powell

November 7, 2024	#4 Hofstra	3–2 (a.e.t.)	#5 Charleston	Elon, NC
6:00 p.m. EST	Laurie Goddard 5'; Gabriel Pacheco (yellow card) 68'; Roc Carles 72', (yellow card) 96'; Teddy Baker 108'; Team (yellow card) 108'	Report	(yellow card) 33' Hogan Walker; 65' Matt Lenert; (yellow card) 73' James Barrett; (yellow card) 76' Chris Cushing; 79' Ryan Watson; (yellow card) 83' James Watson	Stadium: Rudd Field; Attendance: 74; Referee: Richard Crowgey; Assistant referees: Kevin Uitto; Aaron Hornets; Fourth official: Harold Billings

=== Semifinals ===
November 10, 2024	#1 Elon	0–2	#4 Hofstra	Elon, NC
2:00 p.m. EST	Sumner Nenninger (yellow card) 63'; Carlos Levy (yellow card) 66'; Jordin Wilson (yellow card) 70'	Report	(yellow card) 38' Aleksei Armas; 54', 57' Laurie Goddard; (yellow card) 72' Team	Stadium: Rudd Field; Attendance: 457; Referee: Kevin Maurer; Assistant referees: Robert Dail; Carmelo Serbio; Fourth official: Jordan Castillejo

November 10, 2024	#2 Drexel	0–2	#6 UNC Wilmington	Philadelphia, PA
3:00 p.m. EST	Colin Davis (yellow card) 74'	Report	(yellow card) 62' Josef Hefele; 76' Osei Gyamfi; 81' Cesare D'Amico	Stadium: Vidas Field; Attendance: 475; Referee: Victor Borges; Assistant referees: Kenny Freeman; Ricardo Barreto; Fourth official: Marc Gottfried

=== Final ===
November 16, 2024	#4 Hofstra	1–0	#6 UNC Wilmington	Hempstead, NY
7:00 p.m. EST	Laurie Goddard (yellow card) 40'; Team (yellow card) 40'; UNC Wilmington Own Goal 81'	Report	(yellow card) 57' Bryan Miralrio; (yellow card) 87' Ethan Newsome; (red card) 89' Josef Hefele	Stadium: Hofstra Soccer Stadium; Attendance: 1,200; Referee: Mike DeFelice; Assistant referees: Michael Andreaccio; Kevin Rodrigo; Fourth official: Colby Johnson

== Statistics ==
=== Goalscorers ===
There were 12 goals scored in 5 matches, for an average of 2.4 goals per match (as of November 16, 2024).

3 goals

- Laurie Goddard – Hofstra

1 goal

- Christian Acevedo – UNC Wilmington
- Teddy Baker – Hofstra
- Roc Charles – Hofstra
- Cesare D'Amico – UNC Wilmington
- Osei Gyamfi – UNC Wilmington
- Matt Lenert – Charleston
- Erik Reis – Monmouth
- Ryan Watson – Charleston

1 own goal

- UNC Wilmington (vs. Hofstra)

== All-Tournament team ==
Player	Team
Patrick Short	Drexel
Isaiah Whittaker-Francis	Drexel
Mac Msabaha	Elon
Connor Mucchetti	Elon
Roc Carles	Hofstra
**Laurie Goddard**	Hofstra
Pierce Infuso	Hofstra
Jacob Woznicki	Hofstra
Jack Clarkson	UNC Wilmington
Zach Sauer	UNC Wilmington
Trey Smiley	UNC Wilmington

MVP in bold
