= 2018 CAA men's soccer tournament =

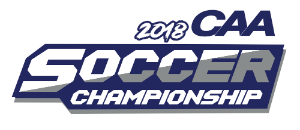
- Classification: Division I
- Teams: 6
- Matches: 5
- Quarterfinals site: Higher seeds
- Semifinals site: Sentara Park; Harrisonburg, Virginia
- Finals site: Sentara Park; Harrisonburg, Virginia
- Champions: James Madison (6th title)
- Winning coach: Paul Zazenski (1st title)
- MVP: Manuel Ferriol (James Madison)
- Broadcast: CAA.tv

2018 Colonial Athletic Association men's soccer standings
	Conf.					Overall
Team	W		L		T	W		L		T
No. 10 James Madison ‡	6	–	2	–	0	15	–	5	–	3
UNC Wilmington +	5	–	1	–	2	12	–	5	–	3
Hofstra	5	–	2	–	1	10	–	6	–	5
Delaware	4	–	3	–	1	5	–	11	–	1
William & Mary	3	–	3	–	2	6	–	10	–	2
Northeastern	3	–	4	–	1	6	–	9	–	1
Drexel	2	–	5	–	1	9	–	5	–	3
Elon	2	–	5	–	1	5	–	8	–	2
Charleston	1	–	6	–	1	5	–	10	–	2
‡ – 2018 CAA Tournament champion + – Invited to the 2018 NCAA Division I Men's Soccer Championship; As of December 1, 2018; Rankings from United Soccer Coaches

The 2018 CAA men's soccer tournament, was the 36th edition of the tournament. It determined the Colonial Athletic Association's automatic berth into the 2018 NCAA Division I Men's Soccer Championship. The tournament will began November 3 and concluded on November 11.

Top-seeded James Madison won the CAA Tournament, marking their sixth ever CAA Tournament title, and their first since 2014. En route to the final, they defeated defending champions, William & Mary, in the semifinals before beating Hofstra in penalty kicks in the final. JMU striker, Manuel Ferriol was named the MVP of the Tournament. With the title, the Dukes earned an automatic berth into the NCAA Tournament.

In addition to the Dukes, regular season runners-up, and tournament semifinalists, UNC Wilmington earned an at-large bid into the NCAA Tournament. In the tournament, the Seahawks were eliminated in the first round by Furman by the virtue of penalty kicks. James Madison defeated High Point in the first round and upset fifth-seeded North Carolina and twelfth-seeded Virginia Tech in the second round and third rounds respectively before falling at Michigan State in the Elite Eight.

== Seeds ==
Seed	School	Conference	Tiebreaker
1	James Madison	6–2–0	
2	UNCW	5–1–2	
3	Hofstra	5–2–1	
4	William & Mary	4–3–2	
5	Delaware	4–3–1	
6	Northeastern	3–4–1	

== Bracket ==
First round Nov. 3
4	Delaware	2
5	William & Mary	3
3	Hofstra	1
6	Northeastern	0

Semifinals; Nov. 9
1	James Madison	2
5	William & Mary	0
2	UNCW	1
3	Hofstra	2

Final; Nov. 11
1	James Madison (p)	1 (4)
3	Hofstra	1 (2)

== Results ==
=== First round ===
November 3
7:00 p.m. EDT

No. 4 Delaware	2–3	No. 5 William & Mary
Edmunds 17'; Mertz 57'	Report	Ngoh 19'; Trott 30', 55'

Stuart and Grant Stadium
Newark, Delaware
Attendance: 425
Referee: Peter Dhima

November 3
7:00 p.m. EDT

No. 3 Hofstra	1–0	No. 6 Northeastern
Vowinkel 52'	Report

Hofstra Soccer Stadium
Hempstead, New York
Attendance: 210
Referee: Saam Jalayer

=== Semifinals ===
November 9
4:00 p.m. EST

No. 2 UNCW	1–2	No. 3 Hofstra
Reynolds 32'	Report	Nealis 80'; Brown 86'

Sentara Park
Harrisonburg, Virginia
Attendance: 0
Referee: Peter Dhima

November 9
7:00 p.m. EST

No. 1 James Madison	2–0	No. 5 William & Mary
Jeffris 36'; Judge 56'	Report

Sentara Park
Harrisonburg, Virginia
Attendance: 497
Referee: Mike Stutt

=== Final ===
November 11
1:00 p.m. EST

No. 1 James Madison	1–1 (a.e.t.)	No. 3 Hofstra
Ferriol 10'	Report	Vowinkel 81'
Penalties
Ward-Baptiste (penalty scored); Nikkessen (penalty scored); Franz (penalty scored); Ferriol (penalty scored)	4–2	(penalty missed) O'Malley; (penalty scored) Strongin; (penalty scored) Ramsay; (penalty missed) Lindqvist

Sentara Park
Harrisonburg, Virginia
Attendance: 362
Referee: Shaun Papperman

== Statistics ==
=== Goalscorers ===
2 Goals

- (United States) Reeves Trott – William & Mary
- (United States) Matt Vowinkel – Hofstra

1 Goal

- (United States) Nathan Edmunds – Delaware
- (United States) Ryan Mertz – Delaware
- (England) Luke Brown – Hofstra
- (United States) Sean Nealis – Hofstra
- (Spain) Manuel Ferriol – James Madison
- (United States) Carson Jeffris – James Madison
- (United States) Tim Judge – James Madison
- (England) Danny Reynolds – UNCW
- (United States) Julian Ngoh – William & Mary

== All Tournament Team ==
**2018 CAA Men’s Soccer All-Tournament team**

Luke Brown, Hofstra
Sean Nealis, Hofstra
George O’Malley, Hofstra
TJ Bush, James Madison
Thomas Shores, James Madison
Yannick Franz, James Madison
**Manuel Ferriol, James Madison**
Joel Bylander, UNCW
Danny Reynolds, UNCW
Julian Ngoh, William & Mary
Reeves Trott, William & Mary

MVP in Bold
