= 2018 James Madison Dukes men's soccer team =

American college soccer season

2018 James Madison Dukes men's soccer

CAA Regular Season Champions CAA Tournament Champions

NCAA Tournament, Quarterfinals
- Conference: Colonial Athletic Association
- U. Soc. Coaches poll: No. 10
- TopDrawerSoccer.com: No. 8
- Record: 15–4–2 (6–2–0 CAA)
- Head coach: Paul Zazenski (1st season)
- Assistant coaches: Adam Perron (2nd season); Nicholas Melville (1st season)
- Home stadium: Sentara Park

2018 Colonial Athletic Association men's soccer standings
	Conf.					Overall
Team	W		L		T	W		L		T
No. 10 James Madison ‡	6	–	2	–	0	15	–	5	–	3
UNC Wilmington +	5	–	1	–	2	12	–	5	–	3
Hofstra	5	–	2	–	1	10	–	6	–	5
Delaware	4	–	3	–	1	5	–	11	–	1
William & Mary	3	–	3	–	2	6	–	10	–	2
Northeastern	3	–	4	–	1	6	–	9	–	1
Drexel	2	–	5	–	1	9	–	5	–	3
Elon	2	–	5	–	1	5	–	8	–	2
Charleston	1	–	6	–	1	5	–	10	–	2
‡ – 2018 CAA Tournament champion + – Invited to the 2018 NCAA Division I Men's Soccer Championship; As of December 1, 2018; Rankings from United Soccer Coaches

The 2018 James Madison Dukes men's soccer team represented James Madison University during the 2018 NCAA Division I men's soccer season. It was the university's 51st season fielding a men's varsity soccer program, and the university's 40th in the Colonial Athletic Association.

The season was highlighted by the Dukes winning both the CAA Regular season as well as the 2018 CAA Men's Soccer Tournament, making it their sixth tournament championship, and their seventh regular season championship. The Dukes earned an automatic berth into the 2018 NCAA Division I Men's Soccer Tournament, where they had their best run in program history, reaching the quarterfinals (Elite Eight) of the competition.

== Roster ==
Note: Flags indicate national team as defined under FIFA eligibility rules; some limited exceptions apply. Players may hold more than one non-FIFA nationality.

No.	Pos.	Nation	Player
00	GK	USA	Nathan Christenson
0	GK	USA	Sean Connolly
1	GK	USA	T. J. Bush
2	DF	USA	Shaun McKenna
3	DF	ISL	Petur Thorsteinsson
4	MF	SUI	Tim Estermann
5	MF	GER	Niclas Mohr
6	FW	CAN	Thomas Shores
7	FW	GER	Janis Lamatsch
8	FW	USA	Carson Jeffris
9	FW	ENG	Aaron Ward-Baptiste
10	MF	ESP	Manuel Ferriol
11	DF	USA	Billy Metzler
12	DF	SWE	Melker Anshelm
13	MF	NED	Maarten Nikkessen

No.	Pos.	Nation	Player
14	MF	GER	Yannick Franz
15	FW	USA	Jack Dugan
16	FW	USA	Max Poelker
18	MF	FIN	Peik Koskinen
19	DF	USA	Tom Judge
20	MF	USA	Connor Hester
22	FW	USA	Lewis Long IV
23	MF	USA	Trent Bailey
24	FW	USA	Brennen Burton
25	DF	USA	Brandon Clegg
26	MF	USA	Tyler Clegg
27	MF	USA	Mark Elmore
29	MF	ESP	Fernando Casero
30	GK	USA	Alex DeSatnick
33	DF	GER	Soheyl Alipour-Rafi

== Schedule ==
Date Time, TV	Rank^{#}	Opponent^{#}	Result	Record	Site (Attendance) City, State
Preseason
08/12/2018*; 7:00 pm		George Washington	Cancelled		Sentara Park; Harrisonburg, VA
08/12/2018*; 7:00 pm		UMBC			Sentara Park; Harrisonburg, VA
Regular season
08/24/2018*; 7:00 pm		Gardner–Webb; Marriott JMU Invitational	W 4–0	1–0–0	Sentara Park (427); Harrisonburg, VA
08/26/2018*; 7:30 pm		No. 23 Air Force; Marriott JMU Invitational	L 0–1 ^{2OT}	1–1–0	Sentara Park (784); Harrisonburg, VA
08/31/2018*; 5:00 pm		at Cal State Fullerton	T 1–1 ^{2OT}	1–1–1	Titan Stadium (1,134); Fullerton, CA
09/02/2018*; 10:00 pm		at UC Irvine	L 1–2 ^{2OT}	1–2–1	Anteater Stadium (285); Irvine, CA
09/08/2018*; 7:00 pm		Radford	W 3–1	2–2–1	Sentara Park (267); Harrisonburg, VA
09/15/2018; 4:00 pm		at No. 21 Drexel	W 3–0	3–2–1 (1–0–0)	Vidas Field (383); Philadelphia, PA
09/18/2018*; 7:00 pm		at Liberty	Cancelled		Liberty Soccer Stadium; Lynchburg, VA
09/22/2018; 8:00 pm		Northeastern	W 1–0	4–2–1 (2–0–0)	Sentara Park (331); Harrisonburg, VA
09/26/2018; 7:00 pm		Delaware	W 4–0	5–2–1 (3–0–0)	Sentara Park (221); Harrisonburg, VA
09/29/2018; 1:00 pm		vs. No. 14 UNCW	L 0–2	5–3–1 (3–1–0)	UNCG Soccer Stadium (48); Greensboro, NC
10/02/2018*; 7:00 pm		at No. 17 NC State	T 0–0 ^{2OT}	5–3–2	Dail Soccer Field (810); Raleigh, NC
10/06/2018; 7:00 pm		College of Charleston	W 3–1	6–3–2 (4–1–0)	Sentara Park (371); Harrisonburg, VA
10/10/2018; 7:00 pm		at William & Mary	W 1–0	7–3–2 (5–1–0)	Albert–Daly Field (405); Williamsburg, VA
CAA Tournament
11/09/2018*; 7:00 pm	(1)	(5) William & Mary; Semifinals	W 2–0	12–4–2	Sentara Park (497); Harrisonburg, VA
11/11/2018*; 1:00 pm	(1)	(3) Hofstra; CAA Championship	T 1–1; W 4–2 (p) ^{2OT}	12–4–3	Sentara Park (362); Harrisonburg, VA
NCAA Tournament
11/15/2018*; 7:00 pm	No. 25	at No. 16 High Point; First Round	W 3–0	13–4–3	Vert Stadium (757); High Point, NC
11/18/2018*; 6:00 pm	No. 25	at (5) No. 4 North Carolina; Second Round	W 2–1	14–4–3	WakeMed Soccer Park (850); Cary, NC
11/25/2018*; 4:00 pm	No. 16	at (12) No. 9 Virginia Tech; Third Round	W 3–0	15–4–3	Sandra D. Thompson Field (740); Blacksburg, VA
12/01/2018*; 5:00 pm	No. 8	at No. 5 Michigan State; Quarterfinals	L 1–2	15–5–3	DeMartin Soccer Complex; East Lansing, MI
*Non-conference game. ^{#}Rankings from United Soccer Coaches. (#) Tournament seedings in parentheses.
