= Richard Nuttall =

English football coach

Personal information
- Full name: Richard Nuttall
- Date of birth: 16 June 1962 (age 64)
- Place of birth: South Yorkshire, United Kingdom
- Height: 1.78 m (5 ft 10 in)
- Position: Defender

Youth career
- 1972–1978: Stoke City
- 1979–1980: Leeds United

Senior career*
Years	Team	Apps	(Gls)
1981–1982	Leeds United	0	(0)
1994–1996	Long Island Rough Riders	34	(3)

Managerial career
- 1983–1988: North Shore Vikings
- 1989–2025: Hofstra Pride
- * Club domestic league appearances and goals

Richard Nuttall (born 1961 or 1962) is an English former football coach and player. He was the head coach of the Hofstra University men's soccer program from 1989 to 2025.

== Early life and playing career ==
Richard Nuttall was born in South Yorkshire and grew up playing as a defender in the academies of Stoke City and Leeds United. Nuttall went professional in 1978 for Leeds United, although he never made an appearance with the club. In 1981, he joined Stoke City, but also never made an appearance with the club.

In 1983, Nuttall moved to the United States full-time and was a physicals education teacher and football coach at North Shore High School until 1988, when he was hired at the head manager for Hofstra University's men's team.

While a coach at Hofstra, Nuttall played for the Long Island Rough Riders of then the USISL from 1994 until 1996.

== Managerial career ==
Nuttall began his coaching tenure at Hofstra in 1988, taking over a program that had experienced five losing seasons in the previous nine years. In 1997, he led the team, then known as the Flying Dutchmen, to a 14-4-3 record, including a 9–0 mark in America East play. The team was the top seed in the postseason tournament but lost to defending champion Boston University in the finals. Despite the loss, Nuttall was named Division I Coach of the Year in Region II by the NSCAA.

In 1999, Nuttall led Hofstra to an early season national ranking, finishing with a 9–9 record. The following year, he guided the team back to the America East Championship game, resulting in an 11-6-3 overall record. In 2001, Hofstra's last season in the America East Conference, Nuttall led his team to a 9-9-1 record and a berth in the America East Tournament for the fourth time in five years.

In 2004, Nuttall guided the Pride to one of their most memorable seasons, winning the Colonial Athletic Association (CAA) championship and earning their first-ever NCAA Division I Tournament berth. Hofstra defeated nationally ranked Seton Hall before losing to third-seeded Maryland. The team continued its success by winning the CAA championship and making NCAA Tournament appearances in 2005 and 2006, with the 2006 team advancing to the second round of the NCAA Tournament.

In 2010, Nuttall achieved his 200th career win as Hofstra defeated VCU in the CAA semifinals. The team reached the CAA title game in 2012 and 2013, with Chris Griebsch earning CAA Player of the Year honors and setting Hofstra's career assist record. Nuttall was named CAA Coach of the Year in 2015 after leading the Pride to both regular-season and tournament conference championships and an NCAA Tournament appearance.

In 2016, Nuttall earned his second consecutive CAA Coach of the Year honor, leading the team to a 9-8-1 record and hosting the CAA tournament after securing the regular-season championship. Joseph Holland was selected 10th overall in the MLS SuperDraft by the Houston Dynamo, becoming the first Hofstra alumnus to be taken in the SuperDraft.

The team continued to achieve success under Nuttall's leadership, reaching the CAA finals in 2018 and 2019, with Sean Nealis being named CAA Defensive Player of the Year in 2018 and selected in the MLS SuperDraft by the New York Red Bulls. In the shortened 2020 season, played in spring 2021 due to the COVID-19 pandemic, Nuttall led the team to a 5-2-3 record, a CAA North Division championship, and a CAA finals appearance.

The 2021 season was particularly successful, with the team setting a school record of 18 victories (18–2–2), winning the CAA title, and advancing to the third round of the NCAA Championship for the first time in program history. The team finished the season ranked 13th in the final poll and 8th in the final NCAA RPI, both program bests. Nuttall was named CAA Coach of the Year, and the coaching staff received United Soccer Coaches Regional Coaching Staff of the Year accolades. Senior Hendrik Hebbeker earned All-America honors, and nine players received All-CAA recognition.

In 2022, Hofstra won its second consecutive CAA Championship with a 14-4-3 record. Junior forward Ryan Carmichael was named CAA Player of the Year, and sophomore midfielder Eliot Goldthorp earned All-America honors, ranking second nationally in points and goals. In 2023, Nuttall and his staff receiving regional coaching honors.

== Managerial statistics ==
Record table
Season	Team	Overall	Conference	Standing	Postseason
Hofstra (Independent) (1989–1992)
1989	Hofstra	4–15–1			
1990	Hofstra	7–9–1			
1991	Hofstra	7–8–3			
1992	Hofstra	8–12–0			
Hofstra (East Coast Conference) (1993–1993)
1993	Hofstra	13–7–1	1–3–0	4th	
Hofstra (Independent) (1994–1994)
1994	Hofstra	12–4–3			
Hofstra (America East) (1995–2001)
1995	Hofstra	3–16–0	0–9–0	10th	
1996	Hofstra	10–5–4	3–3–3	6th	
1997	Hofstra	14–4–3	9–0–0	1st	Am. East final
1998	Hofstra	9–7–3	5–3–1	4th	Am. East semifinal
1999	Hofstra	9–9–0	4–5–0	7th	
2000	Hofstra	11–6–3	6–2–1	3rd	Am. East final
2001	Hofstra	9–9–1	6–5–0	5th	Am. East quarterfinal
Hofstra (CAA) (2002–present)
2002	Hofstra	10–7–1	3–4–2	7th	
2003	Hofstra	7–9–2	3–4–2	7th	
2004	Hofstra	12–10–1	4–4–1	6th	CAA champions NCAA second round
2005	Hofstra	14–5–3	7–2–2	2nd	CAA champions NCAA first round
2006	Hofstra	12–8–3	4–3–0	5th	CAA champions NCAA second round
2007	Hofstra	7–9–2	6–5–0	8th	
2008	Hofstra	6–9–4	5–3–3	5th	CAA quarterfinal
2009	Hofstra	8–7–2	6–3–2	5th	CAA quarterfinal
2010	Hofstra	7–7–5	4–3–3	3rd	CAA final
2011	Hofstra	7–10–1	4–7–0	10th	
2012	Hofstra	11–6–4	5–4–1	5th	CAA final
2013	Hofstra	8–7–3	2–3–2	6th	CAA quarterfinal
2014	Hofstra	10–6–3	5–2–1	1st	CAA semifinal
2015	Hofstra	14–8–0	6–2–0	1st	CAA champions NCAA second round
2016	Hofstra	9–8–1	7–1–0	1st	CAA semifinal
2017	Hofstra	6–6–6	3–1–4	4th	CAA quarterfinal
2018	Hofstra	10–6–5	5–2–1	3rd	CAA final
2019	Hofstra	10–6–3	5–2–1	2nd	CAA semifinal
2020	Hofstra	5–2–3	2–0–2	1st, North	CAA final
2021	Hofstra	18–2–2	5–1–2	1st	CAA champions NCAA third round
2022	Hofstra	14–4–3	5–2–2	3rd	CAA champions NCAA first round
2023	Hofstra	14–3–5	5–1–2	1st	CAA champions NCAA second round
2024	Hofstra				
Hofstra:		4–15–1 (.225)	0–0–0 (–)		
Total:		0–0–0 (–)			
National champion Postseason invitational champion Conference regular season champion Conference regular season and conference tournament champion Division regular season champion Division regular season and conference tournament champion Conference tournament champion
