= 2019 CAA men's soccer tournament =

- Classification: Division I
- Teams: 6
- Matches: 5
- Site: UNCW Soccer Stadium; Wilmington, North Carolina
- Champions: James Madison (7th title)
- Winning coach: Paul Zazenski (2nd title)
- MVP: Niclas Mohr (James Madison)
- Broadcast: ESPN3

2019 Colonial Athletic Association men's soccer standings
	Conf.					Overall
Team	W		L		T	W		L		T
UNCW	7	–	0	–	1	12	–	5	–	2
James Madison ‡	5	–	2	–	1	12	–	7	–	2
Hofstra	5	–	2	–	1	10	–	7	–	2
William & Mary	4	–	2	–	2	7	–	9	–	2
Northeastern	3	–	3	–	2	6	–	9	–	3
Delaware	2	–	4	–	2	3	–	9	–	3
Elon	2	–	6	–	0	7	–	9	–	1
Drexel	1	–	5	–	1	6	–	9	–	2
Charleston	1	–	7	–	1	2	–	12	–	1
‡ – 2019 CAA Tournament champion + – Invited to the 2019 NCAA tournament; As of 32 November 2019; Rankings from United Soccer Coaches

The 2019 CAA men's soccer tournament, was the 37th edition of the tournament. It determined the Colonial Athletic Association's automatic berth into the 2019 NCAA Division I men's soccer tournament. The tournament began November 8 and concluded on November 16.

James Madison, the defending champions, repeated as champions, defeating UNCW in the final.

== Seeds ==
Seed	School	Conference	Tiebreaker
1	UNCW	7–0–1	
2	James Madison	5–2–1	1–0 vs. HOF
3	Hofstra	5–2–1	0–1 vs. JMU
4	William & Mary	4–2–2	
5	Northeastern	3–3–2	
6	Delaware	2–4–2	

== Bracket ==
Quarterfinals; November 8
4	William & Mary	4
5	Northeastern	1
3	Hofstra	2
6	Delaware	1

Semifinals; November 10
1	UNCW	2
4	William & Mary	1
2	James Madison (pen.)	1 (4)
3	Hofstra	1 (3)

CAA Championship; November 16
1	UNCW	0
2	James Madison (a.e.t.)	1

== Results ==
=== First round ===
November 8
1:00 p.m. EDT

No. 4 William & Mary	4–1	No. 5 Northeastern
Ngoh 21', 26'; Eberle 59'; Levengood 72'	Report	Ennin 31'

UNCW Soccer Stadium, Wilmington
Attendance: 75
Referee: Howard Ash

November 8
1:00 p.m. EDT

No. 3 Hofstra	2–1	No. 6 Delaware
Rieper 11'; Vowinkel 86'	Report	de la Bandera 7'

Sentara Park, Harrisonburg
Attendance: 103
Referee: J. C. Griggs

=== Semifinals ===
November 10
1:00 p.m. EDT

No. 1 UNCW	2–1	No. 4 William & Mary
Reynolds 12'; Goodrum 66'	Report	Levengood 23'

UNCW Soccer Stadium, Wilmington
Attendance: 764
Referee: Rick Rogers

November 10
3:00 p.m. EDT

No. 2 James Madison	1–1 (a.e.t.)	No. 3 Hofstra
Ferriol 9' (pen.)	Report	Hebbeker 20'
Penalties
Jeffris (penalty missed); Estermann (penalty scored); Mohr (penalty scored); Ferriol (penalty scored); Casero (penalty scored)	4–3	(penalty missed) Vowinkel; (penalty scored) Strongin; (penalty scored) Ramsay; (penalty scored) Mason; (penalty missed) Savill

Sentara Park, Harrisonburg
Attendance: 327
Referee: John Brady

=== Final ===
November 16
7:00 p.m. EDT

No. 1 UNCW	0–1 (a.e.t.)	No. 2 James Madison
	Report	Mohr 107'

UNCW Soccer Stadium, Wilmington
Attendance: 1,108
Referee: David Erbacher

== Awards ==
=== All Tournament XI ===
The All Tournament XI was announced following the CAA Championship Game.

- Melker Anshelm, James Madison
- TJ Bush, James Madison
- Manuel Ferriol, James Madison
- Niclas Mohr, James Madison (Most Outstanding Player)
- Gabriel Cabral, UNCW
- Phillip Goodrum, UNCW
- Mark Lindstrom, UNCW
- Hendrik Hebbeker, Hofstra
- George O’Malley, Hofstra
- Alexander Levengood, William & Mary
- Julian Ngoh, William & Mary
