= 2023 CAA men's soccer tournament =

- Classification: Division I
- Teams: 6
- Matches: 5
- Attendance: 2,591
- Site: Campus Sites (Higher Seed)
- Champions: Hofstra (7th title)
- Winning coach: Richard Nuttall (7th title)
- MVP: Pierce Infuso (Hofstra)
- Broadcast: FloSports

2023 Coastal Athletic Association men's soccer standings
	Conf.					Overall
Team	W		L		T	W		L		T
No. 17 Hofstra ‡	5	–	1	–	2	14	–	3	–	5
Monmouth	5	–	1	–	2	8	–	4	–	6
Stony Brook	4	–	1	–	3	6	–	6	–	5
Delaware	3	–	2	–	3	9	–	4	–	6
Drexel	3	–	2	–	3	9	–	2	–	5
Elon	3	–	3	–	2	6	–	8	–	4
Charleston	2	–	4	–	2	6	–	6	–	5
Campbell	2	–	4	–	2	4	–	6	–	4
UNC Wilmington	1	–	4	–	3	6	–	6	–	4
Northeastern	1	–	4	–	3	4	–	7	–	6
William & Mary	1	–	4	–	3	2	–	8	–	6
‡ – 2023 CAA tournament champion + – At-large invitation to the 2023 NCAA tournament; As of December 12, 2023; Rankings from United Soccer Coaches; Source: CAA

The 2023 CAA men's soccer tournament was the postseason men's soccer tournament for the Coastal Athletic Association held from November 2 through November 11, 2023. The five-match tournament took place at campus sites, with the higher seed hosting. The six-team single-elimination tournament consisted of three rounds based on seeding from regular season conference play. The defending champions were the Hofstra Pride. They were able to successfully defend their title, as the top overall seed they defeated the second seed Monmouth 2–1 in overtime in the Final. The conference tournament title was the seventh overall for the Hofstra men's soccer program all of which have come under head coach Richard Nuttall. This was the third straight year that Hofstra won the CAA tournament. As tournament champions, Hofstra earned the CAA's automatic berth into the 2023 NCAA Division I men's soccer tournament.

This was the first tournament under the Coastal Athletic Association and the conference changed its name from the "Colonial Athletic Association" identity on July 20, 2023.

== Seeding ==
The top six teams in the regular season earned a spot in the 2023 tournament. Teams were seeded based on regular season conference record and tiebreakers were used to determine seedings of teams that finished with the same record. A tiebreaker was required to determine the first and second seeds in the tournament as both Hofstra and Monmouth finished the season with seventeen regular season conference points. Hofstra earned the top seed in the tournament by virtue of their 1–0 regular season win on October 7. A tiebreaker was required to determine the fourth and fifth seeds as Delaware and Drexel both finished the season with thirteen conference points. The two teams played to a 3–3 draw during the regular season. The second tiebreaker was records against the top seed. Delaware defeated Hofstra 2–1 on October 14, while Drexel lost to Hofstra 1–0 on October 21. Therefore, Delaware earned the fourth seed and the right to host the two team's match-up in the First Round.

Seed	School	Conference Record	Points
1	Hofstra	5–1–2	17
2	Monmouth	5–1–2	17
3	Stony Brook	4–1–3	15
4	Delaware	3–2–3	12
5	Drexel	3–2–3	12
6	Elon	3–3–2	11

== Bracket ==
First Round; Thursday, November 2
4	Delaware (pen.)	2 (4)
5	Drexel	2 (2)
3	Stony Brook	0
6	Elon	1

Semifinals; Sunday, November 5
1	Hofstra	4
4	Delaware	1
2	Monmouth (pen.)	0 (4)
6	Elon	0 (2)

Final; Saturday, November 11
1	Hofstra (a.e.t.)	2
2	Monmouth	1

== Schedule ==
=== First Round ===
November 2	#4 Delaware	2–2 (a.e.t.) (4–2 p)	#5 Drexel	Hempstead, NY
4:00 p.m. ET	Carlos Fernandez 13'; Sam Donnellan 14'; Adam Vik (yellow card) 110'	Report	23' Antonio Illuminato; (yellow card) 25' Carles Aliberch; 36', (yellow card) 44' Patrick Short; (yellow card) 72' Stephen Appiah	Stadium: Hofstra Soccer Stadium; Attendance: 113; Referee: Victor Borges; Assistant referees: Bruno Mozzo; Hector Rueda; Fourth official: Stephen Danisi
	Penalties
	Sam Donnellan (penalty scored); Richard Monath (penalty missed); Orri Thorhallsson (penalty scored); Carlos Fernandez (penalty scored); TJ Hastings (penalty scored)		(penalty missed) Joshua Pulla; (penalty missed) Carles Aliberch; (penalty scored) Antonio Illuminato; (penalty scored) Giancarlo Vaccaro; (penalty missed) Youri Senden

November 2	#3 Stony Brook	0–1	#6 Elon	West Long Branch, NJ
6:00 p.m. ET	Trevor Harrison (yellow card) 36'	Report	53' Victor Stromsten	Stadium: Hesse Field; Attendance: 58; Referee: Nickrod Fateh; Assistant referees: Juri Siskin; Chris Muhs; Fourth official: Greg Muhs

=== Semifinals ===
November 5	#2 Monmouth	0–0 (a.e.t.) (4–2 p)	#6 Elon	West Long Branch, NJ
1:00 p.m. ET		Report	(yellow card) 100' Edoardo Righetti; (yellow card) 109' Franc Gamiz Quer	Stadium: Hesse Field; Attendance: 207; Referee: Victor Borges; Assistant referees: Hector Rueda; Colby Johnson; Fourth official: Cedric Cook
	Penalties
	Ben Zakowski (penalty scored); Adrian Roseth (penalty scored); Patrick Osiecki (penalty missed); Olle Brorsson (penalty scored); Eryk Dymora (penalty scored)		(penalty missed) Franc Gamiz Quer; (penalty scored) Isak Sedin; (penalty missed) Michael Clow; (penalty scored) Calle Edelstam

November 5	#1 Hofstra	4–1	#4 Delaware	Hempstead, NY
2:00 p.m. ET	Ryan Carmichael 16', 29'; Shane Salmon 45'; Albert Kang 65'	Report	(red card) 54' TJ Hastings; 88' (pen.) Orri Thorhallson	Stadium: Hofstra Soccer Stadium; Attendance: 613; Referee: Shaun Papperman; Assistant referees: Kevin Cavalcanti; Kyle O'Grady; Fourth official: Michael Andreaccio

=== Final ===
November 11	#1 Hofstra	2–1 (a.e.t.)	#2 Monmouth	Hempstead, NY
7:00 p.m. ET	Teddy Baker 20'; Team (yellow card) 39'; Stefan Mason (yellow card) 45' (yellow-red card) 83'; Wessel Speel (yellow card) 83'; Roc Carles (yellow card) 86'; Eliot Goldthorp 96'	Report	(yellow card) 39', (goal) 83' (pen.) Ben Zakowski; (yellow card) 79' Erik Reis; (yellow card) 95' Gabe Dahlin	Stadium: Hofstra Soccer Stadium; Attendance: 1,600; Referee: Mike De Felice; Assistant referees: Tim Shaw; Juri Siskin; Fourth official: Sean Lyons

== Statistics ==
=== Goalscorers ===
There were 13 goals scored in 5 matches, for an average of 2.6 goals per match (as of November 11, 2023).

2 goals

- Ryan Carmichael – Hofstra

1 goal

- Sam Donnellan – Delaware
- Carlos Fernandez – Delaware
- Orri Thorhallson – Delaware
- Antonio Illuminato – Drexel
- Patrick Short – Drexel
- Victor Stromsten – Elon
- Teddy Baker – Hofstra
- Eliot Goldthorp – Hofstra
- Albert Kang – Hofstra
- Shane Salmon – Hofstra
- Ben Zakowski – Monmouth

== All-Tournament team ==
Player	Team
Orri Thorhallsson	Delaware
Adam Vik	Delaware
Victor Stromsten	Elon
Tomasz Wroblewski	Elon
Ryan Carmichael	Hofstra
Eliot Goldthorp	Hofstra
**Pierce Infuso**	Hofstra
Wessel Speel	Hofstra
Olle Brorsson	Monmouth
Eryk Dymora	Monmouth
Ben Zakowski	Monmouth

MVP in bold
