= Stephen Roche (footballer) =

Irish footballer

Personal information
- Full name: Stephen Roche
- Date of birth: 5 July 1986 (age 40)
- Place of birth: Dublin, Ireland
- Position: Midfielder

Team information
- Current team: Long Island Rough Riders
- Number: 23

Youth career
- St Joseph's Boys
- Greystones

Senior career*
Years	Team	Apps	(Gls)
1995–1999	Millwall	7	(0)
2009–2010	UCD	16	(0)
2011	F.C. New York	22	(0)
2012 -	Long Island Rough Riders	9	(5)
- * Club domestic league appearances and goals

Stephen Roche (born 5 July 1986) is an Irish footballer who plays for Long Island Rough Riders.

He previously played in the Football League with Millwall and in the League of Ireland with UCD. Roche plays primarily as a central midfielder.

== Career ==
Roche signed with F.C. New York of the USL Pro league on 18 March 2011.

In May 2013 Roche made his debut for Long Island Rough Riders in a 2–2 draw with Baltimore
