= 2018 NCAA Division I men's soccer tournament =

- Classification: Division I
- Teams: 48
- Matches: 47
- Attendance: 4,858
- Site: Meredith Field at Harder Stadium (Semifinal and Final); Santa Barbara, California
- Champions: Maryland (4th title)
- Winning coach: Sasho Cirovski (3rd title)
- MVP: Offense: Amar Sejdič (Maryland); Defense: Dayne St. Clair (Maryland)
- Broadcast: ESPN U (Semifinals and Final), ESPN2, ACC Network Extra, Big Ten Network, ESPN3, ESPN+

The 2018 NCAA Division I men's soccer tournament was the 60th edition of the NCAA Division I men's soccer tournament, a postseason tournament to determine the national champion of NCAA Division I men's college soccer. The first four rounds of the competition were held at the home ground of the higher seed, while the College Cup (semifinals and final) were held at Harder Stadium on the campus of University of California, Santa Barbara. The championship match was held on December 10, 2018 with the Maryland Terrapins defeating the Akron Zips 1–0 to claim their fourth title in program history.

Maryland did not yield any goals in this year's College Cup, maintaining a clean-sheet and out-scoring opponents, 6–0. This was Sasho Cirovski's third title as the Maryland coach. The Stanford Cardinal came into this tournament as the three-time defending NCAA champions. In last year's final, Stanford defeated Indiana in extra time, 1–0. This year, however, Stanford was defeated by eventual runner-up, Akron, 3–2, in the quarterfinal.

== Qualification ==
As in previous editions of the NCAA Division I Tournament, the tournament features 48 participants out of a possible field of 203 teams. Of the 48 berths, 24 are allocated to the 21 conference tournament champions and to the regular season winners of the Ivy League, Pac-12 Conference, and West Coast Conference, which do not have tournaments. The remaining 24 berths are supposed to be determined through an at-large process based upon the Ratings Percentage Index (RPI) of teams that did not automatically qualify.

The NCAA Selection Committee also names the top sixteen seeds for the tournament, with those teams receiving an automatic bye into the second round of the tournament. The remaining 32 teams play in a single-elimination match in the first round of the tournament for the right to play a seeded team in the second round.

=== Qualified teams ===
Team	Qualified as	Qualified on	Qualification type	Previous appearances in tournament	Previous best performance	2018 Performance
SMU Mustangs	American Conference Champions	November 10, 2018	Automatic	31 (1979, 1980, 1983, 1984, 1985, 1986, 1987, 1988, 1989, 1990, 1991, 1992, 1993, 1994, 1995, 1996, 1997, 1998, 2000, 2001, 2002, 2004, 2005, 2006, 2007, 2009, 2010, 2011, 2012, 2015, 2017)	Semifinals (2000, 2005)	
New Hampshire Wildcats	America East Champions	November 11, 2018	Automatic	2 (1994, 2017)	Second Round (2017)	
Louisville Cardinals	ACC Champions	November 10, 2018	Automatic	10 (2007, 2008, 2009, 2010, 2011, 2012, 2013, 2014, 2016, 2017)	Runners-Up (2010)	
Rhode Island Rams	Atlantic 10 Champions	November 11, 2018	Automatic	11 (1972, 1976, 1977, 1979, 1995, 1996, 1999, 2000, 2003, 2005, 2006)	Quarterfinals (1979)	
Lipscomb Bisons	ASUN Champions	November 10, 2018	Automatic	1 (2017)	First Round (2017)	
Georgetown Hoyas	Big East Champions	November 11, 2018	Automatic	8 (1994, 1997, 2010, 2012, 2013, 2014, 2015, 2017)	Runners-Up (2012)	
Campbell Camels	Big South Champions	November 11, 2018	Automatic	1 (2007)	First Round (2007)	
Indiana Hoosiers	Big Ten Champions	November 11, 2018	Automatic	42 (1974, 1976, 1977, 1978, 1979, 1980, 1981, 1982, 1983, 1984, 1985, 1987, 1988, 1989, 1990, 1991, 1992, 1993, 1994, 1995, 1996, 1997, 1998, 1999, 2000, 2001, 2002, 2003, 2004, 2005, 2006, 2007, 2008, 2009, 2010, 2011, 2012, 2013, 2014, 2015, 2016, 2017)	Champions (1982, 1983, 1988, 1998, 1999, 2003, 2004, 2012)	Semifinalists
UC Riverside Highlanders	Big West Champions	November 10, 2018	Automatic	None (Debut)	—	
James Madison Dukes	CAA Champions	November 11, 2018	Automatic	12 (1973, 1976, 1992, 1993, 1994, 1995, 1996, 2000, 2001, 2005, 2011, 2014)	Third Round (2011)	
Kentucky Wildcats	Conference USA Champions	November 11, 2018	Automatic	8 (1999, 2000, 2001, 2003, 2012, 2014, 2015, 2016)	Third Round (2000)	
UIC Flames	Horizon League Champions	November 10, 2018	Automatic	7 (1999, 2000, 2006, 2007, 2008, 2016, 2017)	Third Round (2007)	
Princeton Tigers	Ivy League Regular Season Champions	November 10, 2018	Automatic	9 (1977, 1979, 1989, 1993, 1995, 1999, 2001, 2009, 2010)	Semifinals (1993)	
Rider Broncs	MAAC Champions	November 11, 2018	Automatic	4 (1997, 1998, 2015, 2016)	First Round (1997, 1998, 2015, 2016)	
Akron Zips	MAC Champions	November 11, 2018	Automatic	28 (1966, 1967, 1968, 1970, 1971, 1975, 1976, 1983, 1984, 1985, 1986, 1998, 2001, 2002, 2003, 2004, 2005, 2007, 2008, 2009, 2010, 2011, 2012, 2013, 2014, 2015, 2016, 2017)	Champions (2010)	Runners-Up
Central Arkansas Bears	MVC Champions	November 11, 2018	Automatic	1 (2017)	First Round (2017)	
LIU Brooklyn Blackbirds	NEC Champions	November 11, 2018	Automatic	14 (1963, 1965, 1966, 1967, 1971, 1972, 1973, 1977, 1981, 1982, 1985, 1986, 2004, 2015)	Runners-Up (1966)	
Stanford Cardinal	Pac-12 Regular Season Champions	November 9, 2018	Automatic	16 (1962, 1978, 1991, 1992, 1997, 1998, 1999, 2000, 2001, 2002, 2009, 2013, 2014, 2015, 2016, 2017)	Champions (2015, 2016, 2017)	
Colgate Raiders	Patriot League Champions	November 11, 2018	Automatic	7 (1959, 1966, 2007, 2008, 2011, 2016, 2017)	Third Round (1992, 2003, 2012, 2013, 2017)	
Furman Paladins	Southern Conference Champions	November 11, 2018	Automatic	12 (1991, 1993, 1994, 1996, 1999, 2000, 2001, 2002, 2007, 2011, 2014, 2015)	Third Round (1999)	
Denver Pioneers	Summit League Champions	November 10, 2018	Automatic	7 (1970, 2008, 2010, 2013, 2014, 2015, 2016)	Semifinals (2016)	
Georgia State Panthers	Sun Belt Champions	November 11, 2018	Automatic	1 (2011)	First Round (2011)	
Grand Canyon Antelopes	WAC Champions	November 11, 2018	Automatic	None (Debut)	—	
Saint Mary's Gaels	WCC Regular Season Champions	November 4, 2018	Automatic	2 (2009, 2011)	Quarterfinals (2011)	
Wake Forest Demon Deacons	RPI No. 1	November 12, 2018	At-Large	21 (1988, 1989, 1990, 1991, 1999, 2001, 2002, 2003, 2004, 2005, 2006, 2007, 2008, 2009, 2011, 2012, 2013, 2014, 2015, 2016, 2017)	Champions (2007)	
North Carolina Tar Heels	RPI No. 3	November 12, 2018	At-Large	25 (1968, 1987, 1988, 1990, 1991, 1993, 1994, 1999, 2000, 2001, 2002, 2003, 2004, 2005, 2006, 2008, 2009, 2010, 2011, 2012, 2013, 2014, 2105, 2016, 2017)	Champions (2001, 2011)	
Duke Blue Devils	RPI No. 10	November 12, 2018	At-Large	26 (1972, 1980, 1981, 1982, 1983, 1985, 1986, 1987, 1989, 1992, 1993, 1994, 1995, 1998, 1999, 2000, 2002, 2004, 2005, 2006, 2007, 2008, 2009, 2010, 2011, 2017)	Champions (1986)	
Notre Dame Fighting Irish	RPI No. 6	November 12, 2018	At-Large	20 (1988, 1993, 1994, 1996, 2001, 2002, 2003, 2004, 2005, 2006, 2007, 2008, 2009, 2010, 2012, 2013, 2014, 2015, 2016, 2017)	Champions (2013)	
Virginia Cavaliers	RPI No. 5	November 12, 2018	At-Large	39 (1969, 1979, 1981, 1982, 1983, 1984, 1985, 1986, 1987, 1988, 1989, 1990, 1991, 1992, 1993, 1994, 1995, 1996, 1997, 1998, 1999, 2000, 2001, 2002, 2003, 2004, 2005, 2006, 2007, 2008, 2009, 2010, 2011, 2012, 2013, 2014, 2015, 2016, 2017)	Champions (1989, 1991, 1992, 1993, 1994, 2009, 2014)	
Maryland Terrapins	RPI No. 12	November 12, 2018	At-Large	35 (1959, 1960, 1961, 1962, 1963, 1964, 1967, 1968, 1969, 1970, 1976, 1986, 1994, 1995, 1996, 1997, 1998, 1999, 2001, 2002, 2003, 2004, 2005, 2006, 2007, 2008, 2009, 2010, 2011, 2012, 2013, 2014, 2015, 2016, 2017)	Champions (1968, 2005, 2008, 2018)	Champions
Virginia Tech Hokies	RPI No. 9	November 12, 2018	At-Large	6 (2003, 2005, 2006, 2007, 2016, 2017)	Semifinals (2007)	
UCF Knights	RPI No. 13	November 12, 2018	At-Large	5 (2002, 2003, 2004, 2010, 2011)	Second Round (2003, 2004, 2010, 2011)	
Syracuse Orange	RPI No. 18	November 12, 2018	At-Large	5 (1984, 2012, 2014, 2015, 2016)	Semifinals (2015)	
UC Irvine Anteaters	RPI No. 17	November 12, 2018	At-Large	5 (2008, 2009, 2011, 2013, 2014)	Third Round (2008, 2013, 2014)	
Oregon State Beavers	RPI No. 27	November 12, 2018	At-Large	3 (2002, 2003, 2014)	Second Round (2014)	
High Point University Panthers	RPI No. 19	November 12, 2018	At-Large	None (Debut)	—	
Charlotte 49ers	RPI No. 20	November 12, 2018	At-Large	12 (1991, 1992, 1994, 1996, 1997, 2009, 2011, 2012, 2013, 2014, 2015, 2016)	Runners-Up (2011)	
West Virginia Mountaineers	RPI No. 14	November 12, 2018	At-Large	12 (1966, 1968, 1971, 1972, 1973, 1981, 1992, 2005, 2006, 2007, 2010, 2011)	Round of 16 (1989, 1992, 1997, 2001, 2005, 2007, 2010)	
Michigan State Spartans	RPI No. 33	November 12, 2018	At-Large	19 (1962, 1963, 1964, 1965, 1966, 1967, 1968, 1969, 2001, 2004, 2007, 2008, 2009, 2010, 2012, 2013, 2014, 2016, 2017)	Champions (1967, 1968)	Semifinalists
Portland Pilots	RPI No. 38	November 12, 2018	At-Large	15 (1988, 1989, 1990, 1991, 1992, 1993, 1995, 1999, 2001, 2002, 2003, 2004, 2007, 2009, 2016)	Semifinals (1988, 1995)	
UCLA Bruins	RPI No. 21	November 12, 2018	At-Large	44 (1968, 1970, 1971, 1972, 1973,1974, 1975, 1976, 1977, 1980, 1983, 1984, 1985, 1986, 1987, 1988, 1989, 1990, 1991, 1992, 1993, 1994, 1995, 1996, 1997, 1998, 1999, 2000, 2001, 2002, 2003, 2004, 2005, 2006, 2007, 2008, 2009, 2010, 2011, 2012, 2013, 2014, 2015, 2016)	Champions (1985, 1990, 1997, 2002)	
Washington Huskies	RPI No. 25	November 12, 2018	At-Large	23 (1972, 1973, 1976, 1978, 1982, 1989, 1992, 1995, 1996, 1997, 1998, 1999, 2000, 2001, 2003, 2004, 2006, 2007, 2012, 2013, 2014, 2016, 2017)	Quarterfinals (2013)	
NC State Wolfpack	RPI No. 28	November 12, 2018	At-Large	14 (1981, 1983, 1984, 1985, 1986, 1987, 1990, 1991, 1992, 1994, 2003, 2005, 2009, 2017)	Semifinals (2009)	
Pacific Tigers	RPI No. 32	November 12, 2018	At-Large	2 (2016, 2017)	Second Round (2016, 2017)	
Michigan Wolverines	RPI No. 36	November 12, 2018	At-Large	6 (2002, 2004, 2008, 2010, 2012, 2017)	Semifinals (2010)	
UNCW Seahawks	RPI No. 31	November 12, 2018	At-Large	3 (2009, 2014, 2017)	Second Round (2009, 2014, 2017)	
Air Force Falcons	RPI No. 22	November 12, 2018	At-Large	12 (1964, 1965, 1968, 1969, 1972, 1977, 1985, 1992, 1993, 1997, 2012, 2017)	Quarterfinals (1968, 1993)	
UConn Huskies	RPI No. 24	November 12, 2018	At-Large	35 (1960, 1966, 1972, 1973, 1974, 1975, 1976, 1978, 1979, 1980, 1981, 1982, 1983, 1984, 1985, 1987, 1988, 1989, 1998, 1999, 2000, 2001, 2002, 2003, 2004, 2005, 2006, 2007, 2008, 2009, 2010, 2011, 2012, 2013, 2015)	Champions (1981, 2000)	

=== Seeding ===
Seeded teams
Seed	School	Conference	Record	Berth type	United Soccer Coaches ranking	RPI ranking
1	Wake Forest	ACC	17–1–0	At-Large	1	1
2	Indiana	Big Ten	16–2–0	Automatic	2	2
3	Kentucky	Conference USA	15–1–1	Automatic	3	5
4	Louisville	ACC	9–4–3	Automatic	10	3
5	North Carolina	ACC	13–2–1	At-Large	4	4
6	Duke	ACC	10–5–2	At-Large	8	11
7	Notre Dame	ACC	10–6–2	At-Large	16	6
8	Saint Mary's (CA)	WCC	16–0–1	Automatic	5	8
9	Stanford	PAC-12	11–2–4	Automatic	6	9
10	Virginia	ACC	9–3–3	At-Large	11	7
11	Maryland	Big Ten	8–6–3	At-Large	NR	12
12	Virginia Tech	ACC	10–6–3	At-Large	24	10
13	Georgetown	Big East	10–4–3	Automatic	19	15
14	UCF	AAC	12–2–2	At-Large	7	13
15	Denver	Summit League	13–3–2	Automatic	9	17
16	Syracuse	ACC	7–6–4	At-Large	NR	19

== Schedule ==
Round	Date
First round	November 15
Second round	November 18
Third round	November 24–25
Quarterfinals	Nov 30 – Dec 2
College Cup Semifinals	December 7
College Cup Final	December 9

== Bracket ==
=== Regional 1 ===
First Round; November 11, 2018
New Hampshire*	0
Colgate	1
Akron*	3
Rider	1
UC Irvine* (pen.)	1 (6)
Grand Canyon	1 (5)
Oregon State*	2
SMU	1

Second Round; November 18, 2018
1	Wake Forest*	2
Colgate	0
Akron	3
16	Syracuse*	1
9	Stanford*	2
UC Irvine	0
Oregon State	0
8	Saint Mary's*	1

Third Round; November 25, 2018
1	Wake Forest*	0
Akron	1
9	Stanford (pen.)	0 (4)
8	Saint Mary's*	0 (2)

Quarterfinals; November 30 – December 2, 2018
Akron	3
9	Stanford *	2

Host Institution*

=== Regional 2 ===
First Round; November 11, 2018
High Point*	0
James Madison	3
Charlotte* (pen.)	2 (3)
Georgia State	2 (0)
West Virginia*	4
LIU Brooklyn	2
Michigan State*	2
UIC	0

Second Round; November 18, 2018
5	North Carolina*	1
James Madison	2
Charlotte	0
12	Virginia Tech*	1
13	Georgetown*	1
West Virginia	0
Michigan State (OT)	2
4	Louisville*	1

Third Round; November 25, 2018
James Madison	3
12	Virginia Tech*	0
13	Georgetown*	0
Michigan State	1

Quarterfinals; November 30 – December 2, 2018
James Madison	1
Michigan State*	2

Host Institution*

=== Regional 3 ===
First Round; November 11, 2018
Portland*	1
UCLA	0
Washington*	0 (4)
Lipscomb (pen.)	0 (5)
NC State*	4
Campbell	1
Pacific*	1
UC Riverside	0

Second Round; November 18, 2018
3	Kentucky*	4
Portland	0
Lipscomb (OT)	1
14	UCF*	0
11	Maryland*	2
NC State	0
Pacific	0
6	Duke*	1

Third Round; November 24, 2018
3	Kentucky*	2
Lipscomb	1
11	Maryland	2
6	Duke*	0

Quarterfinals; November 30 – December 2, 2018
3	Kentucky*	0
11	Maryland	1

Host Institution*

=== Regional 4 ===
First Round; November 11, 2018
Michigan* (pen.)	1 (11)
Princeton	1 (10)
UNCW*	0 (3)
Furman (pen.)	0 (5)
Air Force*	4
Central Arkansas	0
Connecticut* (OT)	4
Rhode Island	3

Second Round; November 18, 2018
7	Notre Dame* (pen.)	0 (12)
Michigan	0 (11)
Furman	0
10	Virginia*	2
15	Denver*	1
Air Force	2
Connecticut	0
2	Indiana*	4

Third Round; November 25, 2018
7	Notre Dame* (OT)	1
10	Virginia	0
Air Force	0
2	Indiana*	2

Quarterfinals; November 30 – December 2, 2018
7	Notre Dame	0
2	Indiana*	1

Host Institution*

=== 2018 College Cup ===
Semifinals; December 7 @ 8:00 PM & 10:45 PM; Meredith Field at Harder Stadium; Santa Barbara, California
Akron	5
Michigan State	1
11	Maryland	2
2	Indiana	0

Championship; December 9 @ 8:00 PM; Meredith Field at Harder Stadium; Santa Barbara, California
Akron	0
11	Maryland	1

== Results ==
=== First Round ===
November 15	Rhode Island	3–4	Connecticut	East Hartford, Connecticut
1:00 PM EST	Dickson 38'; Dickson 40'; Brangman 53'	Report	34' Thiam; 76' Diop; 80' Diop; 99' Diop	Stadium: Pratt & Whitney Stadium; Attendance: 450; Referee: Noel Cotterell

November 15	New Hampshire	0–1	Colgate	Durham, New Hampshire
5:00 PM EST	Bauer (penalty missed) 81'	Report	62' DeLeo	Stadium: Wildcat Stadium; Attendance: 756; Referee: Louis Labbadia

November 15	Akron	3–1	Rider	Akron, Ohio
7:00 PM EST	Egbo 51'; Egbo 84'; Zajac (penalty scored) 88'	Report	78' Decastro; (yellow card) 88' Coco	Stadium: Cub Cadet Field; Attendance: 421; Referee: Brian Miller

November 15	High Point	0–3	James Madison	High Point, North Carolina
7:00 pm EST	Vasconcellos (yellow card) 45'; Bench (yellow card) 54'; Baker (yellow card) 86'	Report	19' Ward-Baptiste; 31' Ferriol; (yellow card) 38' Estermann; 70' Ferriol	Stadium: Vert Stadium; Attendance: 757; Referee: Mark Gorak

November 15	Charlotte	2–2 (a.e.t.) (3–0 p)	Georgia State	Charlotte, North Carolina
7:00 PM EST	Rutherford 9'; Popp (yellow card) 35'; Batse (yellow card) 69'; Bruce 71'; Bruce (yellow card) 71'; Bruce (red card) 73'	Report	(yellow card) 10' Fearnley; 40' Briggs; (yellow card) 69' Rosenwald; 86' Summerfield	Stadium: Transamerica Field; Attendance: 512; Referee: Bill Dittmar
	Penalties
	Montgomery (penalty scored); Holbrook (penalty scored); Madden (penalty scored)		(penalty missed) Proctor; (penalty missed) Hemmings; (penalty missed) Fitzsimmons

November 15	West Virginia	4–2	LIU Brooklyn	Morgantown, West Virginia
7:00 PM EST	Lucas 15'; Takada 35'; Lucas (yellow card) 35'; Albino (yellow card) 38'; Quintanilla 72'; Piatczyc 81'	Report	4' Hansen; 9' Hansen; (yellow card) 38' Achterkamp; (yellow card) 42' Elfaham; (yellow card) 81' Quiros; (yellow card) 81' Barone	Stadium: Dlesk Stadium; Attendance: 207; Referee: Charles Murphy

November 15	Michigan State	2–0	UIC	East Lansing, Michigan
7:00 PM EST	Sierakowski 6'; H. Barone 19'; G. Barone (yellow card) 89'	Report	(yellow card) 29' Perez; (yellow card) 50' Garcia	Stadium: DeMartin Soccer Complex; Attendance: 332; Referee: Heber Estrada

November 15	Portland	1–0	UCLA	Portland, Oregon
7:00 PM EST	Michel 31'; Ortiz (yellow card) 68'; Bench (yellow card) 68'; Stretch (yellow card) 72'	Report	(yellow card) 59' Bench; (yellow card) 64' Kamara; (yellow card) 84' Holt; (yellow card) 89' Martinez	Stadium: Merlo Field; Attendance: 1,844; Referee: Lucas Brooks

November 15	NC State	4–1	Campbell	Raleigh, North Carolina
7:00 PM EST	Norris 42'; Sweeney 69'; Machado 72'; Machado 74'	Report	(yellow card) 37' Betz; 61' Mercer-Miko; (yellow card) 76' Barrow; (yellow card) 78' Signey; (yellow card) 82' Oberti	Stadium: Dail Soccer Stadium; Attendance: 515; Referee: Mark Kadlecik

November 15	Michigan	1–1 (a.e.t.) (11–10 p)	Princeton	Ann Arbor, Michigan
7:00 PM EST	Ybarra (yellow card) 35'; Samake (yellow card) 55'; Tellez (yellow card) 68'; Kleedtke 75'; Borges (yellow card) 86'; Ragen (yellow card) 86'; Mertz (yellow card) 90'	Report	39' Martin; (yellow card) 40' Prudil; (yellow card) 75' Bench	Stadium: U-M Soccer Stadium; Attendance: 474; Referee: Calin Radosav
	Penalties
	Ybarra (penalty missed); Zakyi (penalty scored); Brown (penalty scored); Hallahan (penalty missed); Mertz (penalty scored); Osman (penalty scored); Ragen (penalty scored); Kleedtke (penalty scored); Buca (penalty scored); Rosendall (penalty scored); Ybarra (penalty scored); Zakyi (penalty missed); Brown (penalty scored); Ragen (penalty scored)		(penalty scored) O'Toole; (penalty missed) Prudil; (penalty scored) Morokhovich; (penalty scored) Hampton; (penalty missed) McSherry; (penalty scored) Paniagua; (penalty scored) Belghiti; (penalty scored) Roberts; (penalty scored) Wusu; (penalty scored) Wolf; (penalty scored) O'Toole; (penalty missed) Prudil; (penalty scored) Morokhovich; (penalty missed) Hampton

November 15	UNC-Wilmington	0–0 (a.e.t.) (3–5 p)	Furman	Wilmington, North Carolina
7:00 PM EST	Goodrum (yellow card) 87'; Bylander (yellow card) 106'	Report	(yellow card) 46' Wyke	Stadium: UNCW Soccer Stadium; Attendance: 814; Referee: Brandon Marion
	Penalties
	Lozano (penalty scored); Reynolds (penalty scored); Nilsson (penalty missed); Cruz (penalty scored)		(penalty scored) May; (penalty scored) Baker; (penalty scored) Hale; (penalty scored) Wyke; (penalty scored) McLagan

November 15	Air Force	4–0	Central Arkansas	Colorado Springs, Colorado
8:00 PM EST	Han 56'; Parker 57'; Bone 79'; Sims 82'	Report	(yellow card) 60' Bates; (yellow card) 82' Olsen	Stadium: Cadet Soccer Stadium; Attendance: 670; Referee: Adam Zarrin

November 15	Oregon State	2–1	SMU	Corvallis, Oregon
10:00 PM EST	Djeffal 29'; Cover (yellow card) 42'; Diaz 69'	Report	(yellow card) 38' Maples; 68' Hernandez; (yellow card) 90' Ponder	Stadium: Paul Lorenz Field; Attendance: 806; Referee: Farhad Dahkho

November 15	UC Irvine	1–1 (a.e.t.) (6–5 p)	Grand Canyon	Irvine, California
10:00 PM EST	Quezada (yellow card) 60'; Insi 70' (o.g.)	Report	Jellah 48'	Stadium: Anteater Stadium; Attendance: 726
	Penalties
	Crisostomo (penalty missed); Falck (penalty scored); Yamaguchi (penalty scored); Canales (penalty scored); Gutierrez (penalty scored); Hamilton (penalty scored); Ambrose (penalty scored)		(penalty scored) Drack; (penalty missed) Afonso; (penalty scored) Ramirez; (penalty scored) Gardner; (penalty scored) Tasouris; (penalty scored) Andreou; (penalty missed) Smith

November 15	Washington	0–0 (a.e.t.) (4–5 p)	Lipscomb	Seattle, Washington
10:00 PM EST		Report	Paynter (yellow card) 26'; Locke (yellow card) 83'; Muhlbauer (yellow card) 91'; Dougherty (yellow card) 103'	Stadium: Husky Soccer Stadium; Attendance: 616; Referee: Will Nicholls
	Penalties
	Bartlow (penalty scored); Hauswirth (penalty scored); Bodily (penalty scored); Anderson (penalty missed); Menzies (penalty scored); Ostrem (penalty missed)		(penalty missed) Birchfield; (penalty scored) Paynter; (penalty scored) Eager; (penalty scored) Robinson; (penalty scored) Locke; (penalty scored) Wynia

November 15	Pacific	1–0	UC Riverside	Stockton, California
10:30 PM EST	Orendain 24'	Report		Stadium: Knoles Field; Attendance: 206; Referee: Alex Del Angel

=== Second Round ===
November 18	No. 2 Indiana	4–0	Connecticut	Bloomington, Indiana
12:00 PM EST	Gutman 17'; Dorsey 20'; Mehl 58'; Glass 60'	Report	(yellow card) 74' N'Gague; (yellow card) 77' Metzler	Stadium: Bill Armstrong Stadium; Attendance: 1,106; Referee: Aaron Hernandez

November 18	No. 10 Virginia	2–0	Furman	Charlottesville, Virginia
1:00 PM EST	James (yellow card) 45'; Crofts 78'; Keita (yellow card) 80'; Crofts 85'	Report	(yellow card) 57' Guerra	Stadium: Klöckner Stadium; Attendance: 898; Referee: Karl Kummer

November 18	No. 11 Maryland	2–0	NC State	College Park, Maryland
1:00 PM EST	Sejdić 11'; Elney 57'; Elney (yellow card) 89'	Report	(yellow card) 3' Schneuwly; (yellow card) 86' Sweeney; (yellow card) 87' Taiwo	Stadium: Ludwig Field; Attendance: 1,266; Referee: Charles Murphy

November 18	No. 13 Georgetown	1–0	West Virginia	Washington, DC
2:00 PM EST	Schropp (yellow card) 39'; Nealis 88'	Report		Stadium: Shaw Field; Attendance: 1,777; Referee: Bill Ditmar

November 18	No. 16 Syracuse	1–3	Akron	Hamilton, New York
2:00 PM EST	Norheim (yellow card) 35'; Ferrin 42'	Report	Mohamed 37'; Zajac 74'; Hackworth 81'	Stadium: Beyer-Small '76 Field; Attendance: 240

November 18	No. 12 Virginia Tech	1–0	Charlotte	Blacksburg, Virginia
3:00 PM EST	Strickler 53'	Report	(yellow card) 65' Popp; (yellow card) 65' Rutherford; (yellow card) 72' Seach	Stadium: Thompson Field; Attendance: 446; Referee: Mike Stutt

November 18	No. 8 St. Mary's	1–0	Oregon State	Fresno, California
4:00 PM EST	Engebretsen 81'	Report		Stadium: Ramirez Field; Attendance: 160; Referee: Daniel Radford

November 18	No. 3 Kentucky	4–0	Portland	Lexington, Kentucky
4:00 PM EST	Elmedkhar 41'; Williams 47'; Elmedkhar 60'; Williams 68'	Report	(yellow card) 39' Magana-Rivera; (yellow card) 70' Boyd; (yellow card) 87' Weber; (yellow card) 90' Tiozzo	Stadium: Wendell & Vickie Bell Soccer Complex; Attendance: 1,831; Referee: Eric Tattersall

November 18	No. 1 Wake Forest	2–0	Colgate	Winston-Salem, North Carolina
5:00 PM EST	Fernandez 15'; McMaster 80'	Report	(yellow card) 24' Alberto; (yellow card) 69' Sanogo; (yellow card) 84' Morrison; (yellow card) 90' Ouligian	Stadium: Spry Stadium; Attendance: 1,802; Referee: Carmen Serbio

November 18	No. 4 Louisville	1–2 (a.e.t.)	Michigan State	Louisville, Kentucky
5:00 PM EST	Dieye (yellow card) 55'; Abdikadir (yellow card) 77'; Abdikadir 80'; Fonseca (red card) 93'	Report	16' Beck; (yellow card) 48' H. Barone; (yellow card) 48' G. Barone; (yellow card) 78' Cort; 93' Freitag	Stadium: Cardinal Soccer and Track Stadium; Attendance: 1491; Referee: Hilario Grajeda

November 18	No. 7 Notre Dame	0–0 (a.e.t.) (11–10 p)	Michigan	South Bend, Indiana
5:00 PM EST	Omar (yellow card) 80'	Report		Stadium: Alumni Stadium; Attendance: 363; Referee: Heber Estrada
	Penalties
	Berneski (penalty scored); MacLeod (penalty scored); Dumas (penalty scored); Dedrick (penalty scored); McCabe (penalty scored); Aschieris (penalty missed); Casey (penalty scored); Farina (penalty scored); McFadden (penalty scored); Townes (penalty scored); MacLeod (penalty scored); Dumas (penalty scored)		(penalty scored) Brown; (penalty scored) Ybarra; (penalty scored) Ragen; (penalty scored) Zakyi; (penalty scored) Mertz; (penalty missed) Osman; (penalty scored) Swiech; (penalty scored) Buca; (penalty scored) Kleedtke; (penalty scored) Rosendall; (penalty scored) Brown; (penalty missed) Ybarra

November 18	No. 15 Denver	1–2	Air Force	Denver, Colorado
5:00 PM EST	Perez 47'; Perez (yellow card) 48'; Shinyashiki (yellow card) 53'	Report	13' Parker; 29' Dewing; (yellow card) 90' Uribe; (yellow card) 90' Han	Stadium: CIBER Field; Attendance: 1080; Referee: Matt Grave

November 18	No. 5 North Carolina	1–2	James Madison	Chapel Hill, North Carolina
6:00 PM EST	Montesdeoca 32'	Report	27' Ferriol; (yellow card) 53' Casero; 68' Ward-Baptiste	Stadium: WakeMed Soccer Park; Attendance: 850; Referee: Chris Perso

November 18	No. 6 Duke	1–0	Pacific	Durham, North Carolina
6:00 PM EST	Rayyan 65'; Williamson (yellow card) 77'; Wright (yellow card) 85'	Report	(yellow card) 6' Riley; (yellow card) 55' Jimenez; (yellow card) 77' Sosa	Stadium: Koskinen Stadium; Attendance: 392; Referee: Guido Gonzales

November 18	No. 14 UCF	0–1 (a.e.t.)	Lipscomb	Orlando, Florida
6:00 PM EST	Leerman (yellow card) 65'	Report	97' Robinson	Stadium: UCF Soccer and Track Complex; Attendance: 525; Referee: Lance Jacob VanHaits

November 18	No. 9 Stanford	2–0	UC Irvine	Stanford, California
8:30 PM EST	Beason (penalty scored) 72'; Ryan 83'	Report		Stadium: Laird Q. Cagan Stadium; Attendance: 756; Referee: Ian Anderson

=== Third Round ===
November 24	No. 3 Kentucky	2–1	Lipscomb	Lexington, Kentucky
7:00 PM EST	Reyes 76'; Williams (yellow card) 76'; Rouse 82'	Report	(yellow card) 32' Locke; (yellow card) 58' Paynter; 76' Paynter	Stadium: Bell Soccer Complex; Attendance: 1,939; Referee: Chico Grajeda

November 24	No. 6 Duke	0–2	No. 11 Maryland	Durham, North Carolina
7:00 PM EST	Mckenna (yellow card) 61'; Proch (yellow card) 86'	Report	24' Herve; 60' Sejdić; (yellow card) 62' Di Rosa	Stadium: Koskinen Stadium; Attendance: 362; Referee: Mike Leverne

November 25	No. 2 Indiana	2–0	Air Force	Bloomington, Indiana
1:00 PM EST	Panchot 6'; Mehl 22'	Report	(yellow card) 53' Cooke; (yellow card) 73' Uribe	Stadium: Bill Armstrong Stadium; Attendance: 2,179; Referee: Nicholas Balcer

November 25	No. 13 Georgetown	0–1	Michigan State	Washington, D.C.
1:00 PM EST		Report	(yellow card) 44' Freitag; 45' Miller; (yellow card) 56' Pimlott	Stadium: Shaw Field; Attendance: 1,855; Referee: Mark Kadlecik

November 25	No. 12 Virginia Tech	0–3	James Madison	Blacksburg, Virginia
3:00 PM EST	(yellow card) 57' Sanz; (yellow card) 58' Clarke-Smith	Report	17' (o.g.) Clarke-Smith; (yellow card) 37' Ward-Baptiste; 50' Jeffris; 58' Franz	Stadium: Thompson Field; Attendance: 740; Referee: Charles Murphy

November 25	No. 8 St. Mary's	0–0 (a.e.t.) (2–4 p)	No. 9 Stanford	Moraga, California
4:00 PM EST	Sponer (yellow card) 23'	Report	(yellow card) 106' Gilbey	Stadium: Saint Mary's Stadium; Attendance: 2,753; Referee: Bernhard Hosu
	Penalties
	Zattarin (penalty missed); Engebretsen (penalty scored); Sponer (penalty scored); Svehlik (penalty missed)		(penalty scored) Mosharrafa; (penalty scored) Bulut; (penalty scored) Beason; (penalty scored) Waldeck

November 25	No. 1 Wake Forest	0–1	Akron	Winston-Salem, North Carolina
5:00 PM EST	Carr (yellow card) 76'; Dunwell (yellow card) 82'; Gdula (yellow card) 89'; Bobby Muss (Head Coach) (red card) 90'; Gdula (red card) 90'	Report	(yellow card) 22' Tojaga; (yellow card) 30' Egbo; (yellow card) 41' Lue Young; 46' Zajac; (yellow card) 47' Hernandez	Stadium: Spry Stadium; Attendance: 1,686; Referee: Mike Stutt

November 25	No. 7 Notre Dame	1–0 (a.e.t.)	No. 10 Virginia	Notre Dame, Indiana
5:00 PM EST	Lynn 100'	Report	(yellow card) 80' Keita; (yellow card) 93' Kessler	Stadium: Alumni Stadium; Attendance: 376; Referee: Rubiel Vazquez

=== Quarterfinals ===
November 30	No. 3 Kentucky	0–1	No. 11 Maryland	Lexington, Kentucky
6:00 PM EST	Jason Reyes (yellow card) 56'; JJ Williams (yellow card) 60'	Report	29' Sebastian Elney; (yellow card) 40' Eric Matzelevich; (yellow card) 53' Ben Di Rosa	Stadium: Bell Soccer Complex; Attendance: 3,228; Referee: Mark Kadlecik

November 30	No. 2 Indiana	1–0	No. 7 Notre Dame	Bloomington, Indiana
7:00 PM EST	Panchot 64'; Moore (yellow card) 82'	Report	(yellow card) 58' Berneski; (yellow card) 71' Farrelly	Stadium: Bill Armstrong Stadium; Attendance: 5,159; Referee: Hilario Grajeda

November 30	No. 9 Stanford	2–3	Akron	Stanford, California
9:00 PM EST	Beason (yellow card) 49'; Wehan (yellow card) 54'; Beason (penalty scored); Ryan 68'; Ludwick (yellow card) 82'; Aprahamian (yellow card) 85'	Report	15' Zajac; 44' Zajac; (yellow card) 51' Mohamed; 81' Zajac	Stadium: Laird Q. Cagan Stadium; Attendance: 1,405; Referee: Daniel Radford

December 1	Michigan State	2–1	James Madison	East Lansing, Michigan
5:00 PM EST	Sierakowski 72', 81'	Report	32' Mohr	Stadium: DeMartin Soccer Complex; Attendance: 1,758; Referee: Nima Saghafi

=== College Cup ===
==== Semifinals ====
December 7	Michigan State	1–5	Akron	Santa Barbara, California
8:00 PM EST	(yellow card) 11' H. Barone; 79' Nielsen	Report	Egbo 16'; Rittaccio 32'; Harter 53'; Zajac 65'; Petno 85'; Nikolic (yellow card) 88'	Stadium: Meredith Field at Harder Stadium; Attendance: 4,988; Referee: Robert Sibiga

December 7	No. 2 Indiana	0–2	No. 11 Maryland	Santa Barbara, California
10:45 PM EST		Report	37' Di Rosa; 79' Pines	Stadium: Meredith Field at Harder Stadium; Attendance: 4,988; Referee: Mike Stutt

==== Championship ====
December 9	No. 11 Maryland	1–0	Akron	Santa Barbara, California
8:00 PM EST	Gasper (yellow card) 11'; Sejdič (penalty scored) 57'	Report	(yellow card) 76' Lundt; (red card) 81' Ritaccio; (yellow card) 81' Kahsay; (yellow card) 88' Harter	Stadium: Meredith Field at Harder Stadium; Attendance: 4,858; Referee: Chris Penso

== Statistics ==
=== Goalscorers ===
7 Goals

- (Canada) Marcel Zajac — Akron

4 Goals

- (Bosnia and Herzegovina) Amar Sejdič — Maryland

3 Goals

- (Senegal) Ibrahima Diop — Connecticut
- (Nigeria) David Egbo — Akron
- (Spain) Manuel Ferriol — James Madison

2 Goals

- (United States) Klint Parker — Air Force
- (United States) Timmy Mehl — Indiana
- (England) Aaron Ward-Baptiste — James Madison
- (United States) Kalil El-Medkhar — Kentucky
- (United States) J. J. Williams — Kentucky
- (Denmark) Rasmus Hansen — LIU Brooklyn
- (Haiti) Sebastian Elney — Maryland
- (Brazil) Gabriel Machado — NC State
- (United States) Tyler Dickson — Rhode Island
- (England) Nathaniel Crofts — Virginia

1 Goal

- (United States) Tucker Bone — Air Force
- (United States) Austin Dewing — Air Force
- (South Korea) Danny Han — Air Force
- (United States) James Sims — Air Force
- (United States) Morgan Hackworth — Akron
- (Somalia) Abdi Mohamed — Akron
- (United States) Braden Petno — Akron
- (United States) Carlo Ritaccio — Akron
- (Spain) Alemu Mercer-Miko — Campbell
- (England) Daniel Bruce — Charlotte
- (United States) Dean Rutherford — Charlotte
- (United States) Steven DeLeo — Colgate
- (Senegal) Abdou Mbacke Thiam — Connecticut
- (Israel) Moshe Perez — Denver
- (United States) Issa Rayyan — Duke
- (United States) Dylan Nealis — Georgetown
- (United States) Aris Briggs — Georgia State
- (England) Alex Summerfield — Georgia State
- (United States) Jackson Jellah — Grand Canyon
- (United States) Griffin Dorsey — Indiana
- (United States) Spencer Glass — Indiana
- (United States) Andrew Gutman — Indiana
- (United States) Austin Panchot — Indiana
- (Germany) Yannick Franz — James Madison
- (United States) Carson Jeffris — James Madison
- (United States) Bailey Rouse — Kentucky
- (Costa Rica) Jason Reyes — Kentucky
- (United States) Logan Paynter — Lipscomb
- (England) Louis Robinson — Lipscomb
- (United States) Matt Di Rosa — Maryland
- (France) William James Herve — Maryland
- (United States) Donovan Pines — Maryland
- (United States) Noah Kleedtke — Michigan
- (United States) Hunter Barone — Michigan State
- (United States) Michael Miller — Michigan State
- (United States) Ryan Sierakowski — Michigan State
- (United States) David Norris — NC State
- (England) Brad Sweeney — NC State
- (United States) Giovanni Montesdeoca — North Carolina
- (United States) Jack Lynn — Notre Dame
- (France) Sofiane Djeffal — Oregon State
- (United States) Eric Diaz — Oregon State
- (United States) Anthony Orendain — Pacific
- (United States) Benji Michel — Portland
- (United States) Henry Martin — Princeton
- (Bermuda) Chae Brangman — Rhode Island
- (Spain) Pablo DeCastro — Rider
- (United States) Nicky Hernandez — SMU
- (Norway) Anders Engebretsen — St. Mary's
- (United States) Tanner Beason — Stanford
- (United States) Zach Ryan — Stanford
- (Canada) Massimo Ferrin — Syracuse
- (United States) Kristo Strickler — Virginia Tech
- (United States) Omir Fernandez — Wake Forest
- (Jamaica) Justin McMaster — Wake Forest
- (United States) Logan Lucas — West Virginia
- (Poland) Joey Piatczyc — West Virginia
- (United States) Jorge Quintanilla — West Virginia
- (Japan) Tsubasa Takada — West Virginia

=== Own goals ===
1 Own Goal

- (Canada) Nikal Clarke-Smith — Virginia Tech (playing against James Madison)
- (United States) Esai Easley — Grand Canyon (playing against UC Irvine)

== Record by conference ==
Conference	Bids	Record	Pct.	1st	2nd	3rd	QF	SF	F	NC
American Athletic Conference	3	1–3	.250	2	2	—	—	—	—	—
America East Conference	1	0–1	.000	1	—	—	—	—	—	—
Atlantic Coast Conference	9	7–9	.438	1	9	5	1	—	—	—
Atlantic 10 Conference	1	0–1	.000	1	—	—	—	—	—	—
Atlantic Sun Conference	1	2–1	.667	1	1	1	—	—	—	—
Big East Conference	1	1–1	.500	—	1	1	—	—	—	—
Big South Conference	2	0–2	.000	2	—	—	—	—	—	—
Big Ten Conference	4	13–3	.813	2	4	3	3	3	1	1
Big West Conference	2	1–2	.333	2	1	—	—	—	—	—
Colonial Athletic Association	2	3–2	.600	2	1	1	1	—	—	—
Conference USA	2	3–2	.600	1	2	1	1	—	—	—
Horizon League	1	0–1	.000	1	—	—	—	—	—	—
Ivy League	1	0–1	.000	1	—	—	—	—	—	—
Mid-Atlantic Athletic Conference	1	0–1	.000	1	—	—	—	—	—	—
Mid-American Conference	2	6–2	.750	2	2	1	1	1	1	—
Missouri Valley Conference	1	0–1	.000	1	—	—	—	—	—	—
Northeast Conference	1	0–1	.000	1	—	—	—	—	—	—
Pac-12 Conference	4	3–4	.429	3	2	1	1	—	—	—
Patriot League	1	1–1	.500	1	1	—	—	—	—	—
Southern Conference	1	1–1	.500	1	1	—	—	—	—	—
Summit League	1	0–1	.000	—	1	—	—	—	—	—
Sun Belt Conference	1	0–1	.000	1	—	—	—	—	—	—
Western Athletic Conference	2	2–2	.500	2	1	1	—	—	—	—
West Coast Conference	3	3–3	.500	2	3	1	—	—	—	—

- **Bold** indicates still active in the competition
- The 1st, R32, R16, QF, SF, F, and NC columns indicate how many teams from each conference were in the first round, second round, third round, Quarterfinals, Semifinals, Final, and the National Champion, respectively.

== See also ==
- 2018 NCAA Division I Women's Soccer Tournament
- 2018 NCAA Division I men's soccer season
