= Stony Brook Seawolves men's soccer =

American college soccer team

- Founded: 1963; 63 years ago
- University: Stony Brook University
- Head coach: Ryan Anatol (9th season)
- Conference: CAA
- Location: Stony Brook, New York, US
- Stadium: Kenneth P. LaValle Stadium (capacity: 8,300)
- Nickname: Seawolves
- Colors: Red, blue, and gray
Home	Away

NCAA tournament Round of 32
- 2005

NCAA tournament appearances
- 2005, 2009, 2011

Conference tournament championships
- 2005, 2009, 2011

Conference Regular Season championships
- 2005

The Stony Brook Seawolves men's soccer team is a collegiate soccer team that competes in NCAA Division I and in the Colonial Athletic Association.

== History ==
=== Coaching record ===
		Overall		Conference		
Coach	Years	Record	Pct.	Record	Pct.	Note
Costas Alexandrides	1967–68	13–5–1	.711			
Stoney Burgess	1969–75	68–38–3	.638			
Scottie O'Neill	1976–86	143–57–4	.711			2 TAAC Championships (1983, 1986)
Hugh Beasley	1987–93	50–72–15	.420			1 TAAC Championship (1987)
Brett Teach	1994–99	43–66–3	.397			1 TAAC Championship (1997), first NCAA appearance
Kerem Daser	2000–09	67–100–10	.407			1 Atlantic Sun Championship (2000)
Brett Surrency	2010–	89–75–12	.540			1 Sun Belt Championship (2018)
Total		417–413–38	.532			

== Postseason record ==
=== NCAA Tournament ===
Stony Brook has appeared in three NCAA Tournaments. Their record is 1–2–1

Year	Round	Opponent	Result
2005	First round Second round	Yale; Connecticut	W 2–1 ^{OT} L 0–2
2009	First round	Brown	L 0–1 ^{2OT}
2011	First round	Monmouth	T 0–0 ^{4–5 PK}
