= Tom Judge =

American soccer player

Personal information
- Full name: Thomas Matthew Judge
- Date of birth: May 28, 1999 (age 27)
- Place of birth: Freehold Township, New Jersey, United States
- Height: 1.85 m (6 ft 1 in)
- Position: Defender

College career
Years	Team	Apps	(Gls)
2017–2020	James Madison Dukes	63	(3)

Senior career*
Years	Team	Apps	(Gls)
2019	Cedar Stars Rush	6	(0)
2021	Nashville SC	0	(0)
2021	→ Pittsburgh Riverhounds (loan)	7	(0)
- * Club domestic league appearances and goals as of November 4, 2021

Thomas Matthew Judge (born May 28, 1999) is an American soccer player who plays as a defender.

== Career ==
=== Youth ===
Judge played high school soccer at the Christian Brothers Academy, where he was named Shore Sports Network Shore Conference A-North First Team in 2015, and SCANJ Private All-State First Team, Shore Conference First Team in 2016.

=== College and amateur ===
In 2017, Judge attended James Madison University to play college soccer. In four seasons with the Dukes, including a truncated 2020 season due to the COVID-19 pandemic, Judge made 63 appearances, scored three goals and tallied four assists. Accolades earned by Judge during his college career includes All-CAA Second Team and CAA All-Rookie Team as a freshman, Third Team All-CAA as a sophomore, First Team All-Atlantic Region and First Team All-CAA as a junior, and was a MAC Hermann Trophy Semifinalist, United Soccer Coaches First Team All-American, United Soccer Coaches All-Atlantic Region First Team, All-CAA First Team, and All-VaSID Second Team in his senior year. He also helped the Dukes win three consecutive CAA titles and make three straight NCAA Tournament berths, which included a run to the national quarterfinals in 2018.

During 2019, Judge also appeared with USL League Two side Cedar Stars Rush, making six appearances for the club.

=== Professional ===
On January 21, 2021, Judge was drafted 36th overall in the 2021 MLS SuperDraft by Nashville SC. Judge officially signed with Nashville on June 17, 2021. On July 6, 2021, Judge was loaned to USL Championship side Pittsburgh Riverhounds for the remainder of the season. Judge made his professional debut on August 7, 2021, starting against Charleston Battery in a 3–2 victory. Following the 2021 season Judge's contract option was declined by Nashville and he became a free agent.
