= Danny Reynolds (footballer) =

English footballer

Personal information
- Full name: Danny James Reynolds
- Date of birth: 27 June 1997 (age 29)
- Place of birth: Shilton, England
- Height: 1.75 m (5 ft 9 in)
- Position: Left-back

Youth career
- Oxford United
- Reading
- –2015: Cheltenham Town

College career
Years	Team	Apps	(Gls)
2015–2017	Louisville Cardinals	40	(3)
2018–2019	UNC Wilmington Seahawks	33	(6)

Senior career*
Years	Team	Apps	(Gls)
2019	Brazos Valley Cavalry	2	(1)
2020	Tacoma Defiance	12	(0)
2021	Southern States SC	13	(4)
2022	Sacramento Republic	0	(0)
- * Club domestic league appearances and goals as of 14:51, 23 October 2022 (UTC)

Danny James Reynolds (born 27 June 1997) is an English footballer who plays as a defender.

== Career ==
Reynolds was selected by Seattle Sounders FC with the 35th pick in the second round of the 2020 MLS SuperDraft. On 7 February 2020, Reynolds was signed by the Sounders' USL Championship side Tacoma Defiance. On 7 March 2020, Reynolds made his professional debut against Reno 1868 and logged an assist on the side's lone goal.

For the 2021 season, Reynolds joined National Premier Soccer League side Southern States SC.

On 16 December 2021, it was announced Reynolds would join USL Championship side Sacramento Republic ahead of their 2022 season. Following the 2022 season he was released by Sacramento without having made an appearance.
