= Hofstra Pride men's soccer =

Men's soccer team of Hofstra University

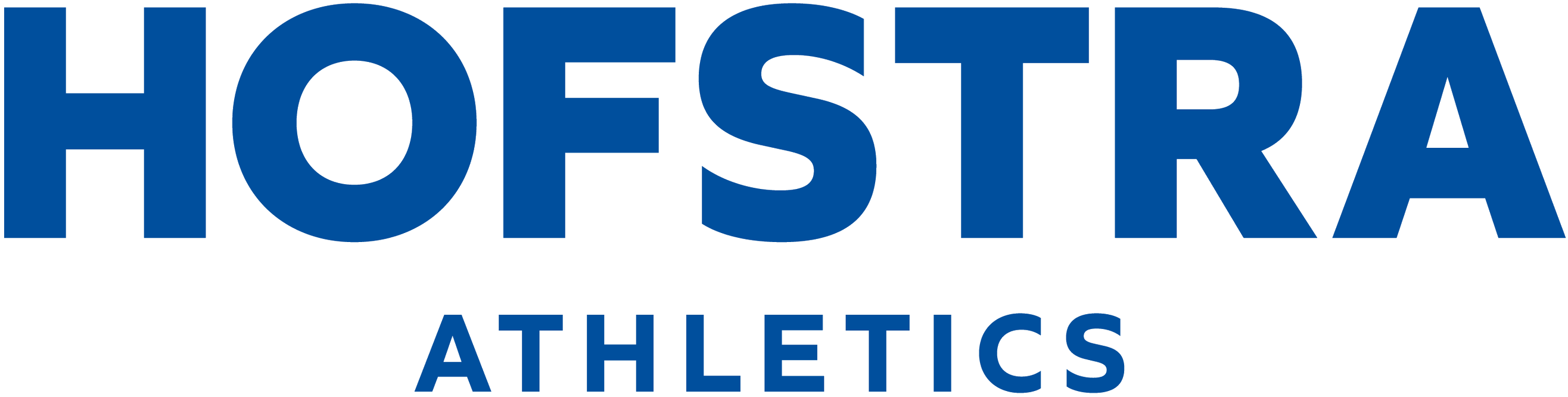
- Founded: 1954; 72 years ago
- University: Hofstra University
- Head coach: Stephen Roche (1st season)
- Conference: CAA
- Location: Hempstead, New York, US
- Stadium: Hofstra University Soccer Stadium (capacity: 1,600)
- Nickname: Pride
- Colors: Blue, white, and gold
Home	Away

NCAA tournament Round of 16
- 2021, 2023, 2025

NCAA tournament Round of 32
- 1968, 2004, 2006, 2015, 2021, 2023, 2024, 2025

NCAA tournament appearances
- 1968, 2004, 2005, 2006, 2015, 2021, 2022, 2023, 2024, 2025

Conference tournament championships
- 2004, 2005, 2006, 2015, 2021, 2022, 2023, 2024

Conference regular season championships
- 1997, 2014, 2015, 2016, 2021, 2023

The Hofstra Pride men's soccer team represents Hofstra University in all NCAA Division I men's college soccer competitions. The Pride play in the Coastal Athletic Association (CAA).

The program has a notable history of achievements and distinguished players. The team has participated in eight NCAA Tournaments, reaching the second round in 2004, 2006, 2015, and 2021, and advancing to the Sweet Sixteen in 2021. They have hosted four NCAA Tournament home games and secured six NCAA Tournament victories. In 2021, the team recorded a school record of 18 victories and finished eighth in the final NCAA RPI rankings. Additionally, Hofstra has won eight CAA men's soccer tournament titles in the years 2004, 2005, 2006, 2015, 2021, 2022, 2023, and 2024.

The program has produced several players who have received individual honors. Michael Todd was named to the CAA 25th Anniversary Team and, along with Gary Flood, had his jersey retired. Johannes Grahn was recognized as a Freshman All-American. Five players have been selected in the MLS SuperDraft: Flood, Todd, Joseph Holland, Sean Nealis, and Matthew Vowinkel. Six players have earned NSCAA/United Soccer Coaches All-America honors, including Ed Gaffney, Todd, Shaun Foster, Holland, Hendrik Hebbeker, and Eliot Goldthorp. The program also includes 11 Academic All-America selections.

Throughout its history, the team has been led by 10 different coaches, with Richard Nuttall serving as head coach for 36 seasons before retiring in 2026. Hofstra has produced 41 all-region performers with a total of 63 selections and 85 all-conference honorees with a total of 156 selections. The team has accumulated 497 wins and notable RPI rankings include 21st after the 2006 season, 32nd after the 2015 campaign, and 33rd after the 2022 season. The team was ranked 13th nationally at the conclusion of the 2005 and 2021 seasons.

== History ==
Hofstra began fielding a men's varsity soccer program in 1954, with Paul Lynner as the program's first head coach. Lynner ultimately coached the program for 11 seasons accumulating a record of 56–66–17. Under their second head coach, Bob VanderWarker, the Pride qualified for their first ever NCAA Division I men's soccer tournament, in 1968. There, Hofstra lost in the first round of the tournament, by 1–3 scoreline against Fairleigh Dickinson.

Throughout the 1970s, the Hofstra Pride went through a dark time, having just one season with a winning record between 1970 and 1982. The nadir of their program occurred during the 1975 season, where Hofstra went winless, posting a 0–14–0 record, ultimately leading to Dan DeStefano's dismissal from the program.

The program began a resurgence in the late 1990s into the 2000s under Richard Nuttall, who guided the program to seven additional NCAA tournament berths as well as several conference regular season and tournament titles in both the America East Conference and CAA.

== Players ==
=== Current roster ===
As of 5 Jun 2025

Note: Flags indicate national team as defined under FIFA eligibility rules; some limited exceptions apply. Players may hold more than one non-FIFA nationality.

No.	Pos.	Nation	Player
1	GK	ITA	Filippo Dadone
2	DF	BRA	Gabriel Pacheco
4	DF	SVN	Jon Jelercic
7	FW	NZL	Owen Barnett
8	MF	ENG	Mylo Hall
10	MF	ESP	Roc Carles
11	FW	CAN	Daniele Mastroiann
12	MF	ENG	Jack O'Malley
13	GK	PAN	Juan Almanza
14	MF	CAY	Justin Byles
16	MF	IRL	Eoin Farrell

No.	Pos.	Nation	Player
17	MF	CZE	Josef Jinoch
18	MF	IRL	Sean O'Donnell
19	MF	ENG	Hugo Few
20	DF	USA	Pierce Infuso
21	FW	USA	Jacob Woznicki
22	FW	IRL	Lennon Gill
23	MF	ENG	Teddy Baker
24	DF	ISL	Thengill Orrason
25	MF	USA	Charlie Blair
30	GK	USA	Gino Cervoni
32	GK	USA	Zach Bittner

=== Retired numbers ===
No.	Player	Pos.	Tenure	No. ret.	Ref.
5	(United States) Gary Flood	DF	2003–06	2008	
9	(England) Michael Todd	FW	2003–06	2008	

== Stadiums ==
The Pride play most of their games at the 1,600-capacity Hofstra University Soccer Stadium, which has been their home stadium since 2003. From 1963 until 2002, the Pride played their home matches primarily at James M. Shuart Stadium. From 1954 until 1962, they played their home games at Hofstra Field.

== Coaching staff ==
As of July 13, 2024. Number of seasons includes the upcoming 2024 season.

Name	Position coached	Consecutive season at Hofstra in current position
Richard Nuttall	Head coach	36th
Stephen Roche	Associate head coach	9th
Shaun Foster	Assistant coach	7th
Adam Janowski	Assistant coach	5th
Robert Sullivan	Athletic Trainer	21st

== Championships ==
=== Conference regular season championships ===
The Pride have won five conference regular season championships. Four of them were in the CAA and one was in the America East.

Year	Coach	Overall Record	Conference Record
1997	Richard Nuttall	14–4–3	9–0–0
2015	Richard Nuttall	14–8–0	6–2–0
2016	Richard Nuttall	9–8–1	7–1–0
2021	Richard Nuttall	18–2–2	5–1–2
2023	Richard Nuttall	14–3–5	5–1–2
Conference regular season championships			5

=== Conference tournament championships ===
The Pride have won eight conference tournament championships, all of which are the CAA men's soccer tournament.

Year	Coach	Opponent	Score	Site	Overall Record	Conf. Record
2004	Richard Nuttall	Old Dominion	1–0	Richmond, VA	12–10–1	4–4–1
2005	Richard Nuttall	Old Dominion	1–0	Norfolk, VA	14–5–3	7–2–2
2006	Richard Nuttall	George Mason	1–1	Virginia Beach, VA	12–6–3	7–3–1
2015	Richard Nuttall	Delaware	2–0	Hempstead, NY	14–8–0	6–2–0
2021	Richard Nuttall	Elon	3–2	Hempstead, NY	18–2–2	5–1–2
2022	Richard Nuttall	Elon	2–1	Elon, NC	14–4–3	5–2–2
2023	Richard Nuttall	Monmouth	2–1	Hempstead, NY	14–3–5	5–1–2
2024	Richard Nuttall	UNC Wilmington	1–0	Hempstead, NY	14–5–2	5–3–0
Conference tournament championships						8

== Rivalries ==
=== Record against CAA opponents ===
Opponent	Series record
Campbell	0–0–1
Charleston	6–1–3
Delaware	24–13–2
Drexel	22–22–12
Elon	10–2–1
Monmouth	7–0–1
Northeastern	13–15–3
Stony Brook	19–13–7
Towson	11–11–6
UNCW	16–6–4
William & Mary	13–12–5

== Coaching records ==
Coach	Years	Overall		Conference		Note
Coach	Years	Record	Pct.	Record	Pct.	Note
Paul Lynner	1954–64	56–66–17	.464			
Bob VanderWarker	1965–69	34–41–7	.457			
Jim Amen	1970	4–11–0	.267			
Dan DeStefano	1971–75	6–61–3	.107			
Angelo Anastio	1976–77	11–13–5	.466			
Ken Germano	1978–81	16–38–6	.421			
Tom Lang	1982–85	37–23–6	.606			
Ian Collins	1986–88	11–31–8	.300			
Richard Nuttall	1989–	322–251–80	.554			
Total		497–535–132	.484			

== Postseason ==
=== NCAA tournament results ===
Hofstra has appeared in eight NCAA Tournaments. Their combined record is 6–8–1.

Year	Seed	Round	Opponent	Result
1968	—N/a	First round	Fairleigh Dickinson	L 1–3
2004	—N/a	First round Second round	Seton Hall; No. 3 Maryland	W 2–1; L 0–4
2005	—N/a	First round	Providence	L 0–1^{OT}
2006	—N/a	First round Second round	Providence; No. 2 Wake Forest	W 2–0; L 1–5
2015	—N/a	First round Second round	Lehigh; No. 3 Georgetown	W 2–1^{OT} L 0–3
2021	—N/a	First round Second round Third round	Lipscomb; No. 12 Penn State; No. 5 Pitt	W 4–2; W 8–2; L 0–4
2022	—N/a	First round	South Florida	L 2–4
2023	No. 14	Second round Third round	Yale; No. 3 North Carolina	W 2–0; T 2–2^{(L 3–5 PK)}
2024	No. 7	Second round	Vermont	L 1–2
