= Manuel Ferriol =

Spanish footballer (born 1998)

Personal information
- Full name: Manuel Ferriol Martínez
- Date of birth: 13 August 1998 (age 28)
- Place of birth: Valencia, Spain
- Height: 1.80 m (5 ft 11 in)
- Position: Attacking midfielder

Team information
- Current team: Hvöt Blönduós
- Number: 23

Youth career
- 2010–2016: Levante

College career
Years	Team	Apps	(Gls)
2016–2019	James Madison Dukes	64	(32)

Senior career*
Years	Team	Apps	(Gls)
2019	Long Island Rough Riders	12	(5)
2020–2021	FC Tucson	30	(2)
2022	Southern States SC	12	(3)
2024–2025	UMF Tindastóll	35	(12)
2026–	Hvöt Blönduós	19	(4)
- * Club domestic league appearances and goals as of 14 October 2026

Manuel Ferriol Martínez (born 13 August 1998) is a Spanish footballer who plays as a midfielder who plays for Hvöt Blönduós in the 2. deild karla.

== Career ==
=== Youth, College & Amateur ===
Ferriol played as part of the Levante academy from 2010 to 2016, before moving to the United States to play college soccer at James Madison University in Harrisonburg, Virginia. At James Madison, Ferriol made 64 appearances, scoring 32 goals and tallying 11 assists. In his senior year with the Dukes, Ferriol won accolades such as CAA Player of the Year, All-CAA First Team, ECAC Offensive Player of the Year, USC All-Atlantic Region First Team As a junior he was named USC All-Atlantic Region First Team, Most Outstanding Player of the CAA Tournament and was All-CAA Second Team. In his sophomore year he was All-CAA First Team.

In his senior college year, Ferriol also played with USL League Two side Long Island Rough Riders, scoring 5 goals and tallying 4 assists in 12 games for them.

=== MLS SuperDraft ===
On 9 January 2020, Ferriol was selected 40th overall in the 2020 MLS SuperDraft by FC Dallas. However, he was not signed by the club.

=== FC Tucson ===
On 27 February 2020, Ferriol signed with FC Tucson of USL League One. He made his league debut for the club on 12 September 2020, appearing as a 79th-minute substitute during a 2–0 loss to North Texas SC.
