= 2018 ACC men's soccer tournament =

Soccer tournament

- Classification: Division I
- Teams: 12
- Matches: 11
- Site: Sahlen's Stadium (Final); Cary, North Carolina (Final)
- Champions: Louisville (1st title)
- Winning coach: Ken Lolla (1st title)
- MVP: (United States) Tate Schmitt (Louisville)
- Broadcast: ESPNU (Final), ACC Network Extra (all other rounds)

2018 ACC men's soccer standings
	Conf.					Overall
Team	W		L		T	W		L		T
Atlantic
No. 6 Wake Forest +	7	–	1	–	0	18	–	3	–	0
No. 16 Louisville ‡	4	–	2	–	2	11	–	5	–	3
NC State +	2	–	4	–	2	10	–	7	–	3
Boston College	2	–	5	–	1	4	–	8	–	4
Syracuse +	1	–	4	–	3	7	–	7	–	4
Clemson	2	–	6	–	0	7	–	9	–	1
Coastal
No. 14 North Carolina +	6	–	1	–	0	14	–	4	–	1
No. 11 Duke +	5	–	3	–	0	11	–	7	–	2
No. 8 Notre Dame +	4	–	3	–	1	11	–	7	–	3
No. 15 Virginia +	3	–	2	–	2	10	–	4	–	3
No. 17 Virginia Tech +	3	–	4	–	1	11	–	7	–	3
Pittsburgh	2	–	6	–	0	8	–	10	–	1
‡ – 2018 ACC Tournament champion + – Invited to the 2018 NCAA Division I Men's Soccer Championship; As of December 11, 2018; Rankings from United Soccer Coaches; Source:The ACC

The 2018 Atlantic Coast Conference men's soccer tournament was the 32nd edition of the ACC Men's Soccer Tournament. The tournament decided the Atlantic Coast Conference champion and guaranteed representative into the 2018 NCAA Division I Men's Soccer Championship. The final was played at Sahlen's Stadium in Cary, NC.

The Louisville Cardinals won the tournament over the North Carolina Tar Heels 1–0 in the final.

== Qualification ==
All twelve teams in the Atlantic Coast Conference earned a berth into the ACC Tournament. The top 4 seeds receive first round byes and will host the winner of a first-round game. All rounds, with the exception of the final are held at the higher seed's home field. Seeding is determined by regular season conference record. Ties are broken by overall winning percentage. Ten of the twelve teams have been ranked this year and eight currently hold spots in the top 11 of the NCAA RPI.

Seed	School	Conference Record	Points
1	Wake Forest	7–1–0	21
2	North Carolina	6–1–0	18
3	Duke	5–3–0	15
4	Louisville	4–2–2	14
5	Notre Dame	4–3–1	13
6	Virginia	3–4–1	10
7	Virginia Tech	3–4–1	10
8	NC State	2–4–2	8
9	Boston College	2–5–1	7
10	Syracuse	1–4–3	6
11	Pittsburgh	2–6–0	6
12	Clemson	2–6–0	6

== Bracket ==
*Note: Home team listed first. Rankings shown are ACC Tournament Seeds.

First Round
#8 NC State	3
#9 Boston College	1
#5 Notre Dame	2
#12 Clemson	0
#6 Virginia	0
#11 Pittsburgh	2
#7 Virginia Tech	3
#10 Syracuse	1

Quarterfinals
#1 Wake Forest	2
#8 NC State	0
#4 Louisville	1
#5 Notre Dame	0
#3 Duke	0 (4)
#11 Pittsburgh	0 (3)
#2 North Carolina	3
#7 Virginia Tech	0

Semifinals
#1 Wake Forest	1
#4 Louisville	2^{OT}
#3 Duke	1
#2 North Carolina	2

Finals
#4 Louisville	1
#2 North Carolina	0

== Schedule ==
=== First round ===
October 31	#8 NC State	3–1	#9 Boston College	Raleigh, NC
7:00 p.m. EST	Brad Sweeney 10'; Gabriel Machado (yellow card) 23'; David Loera 71', (yellow card) 80'; Adian Foster (yellow card) 82'; Alex Bautista 88'	Report	Tyshawn Rose (yellow card) 31'; Lasse Lehmann (yellow card) 44'; Simon Enstrom (yellow card) 58'; Abe Bibas 62'; David Longo (yellow card) 88'	Stadium: Dail Soccer Field; Attendance: 437; Referee: Hudson Owens

October 31	#5 Notre Dame	2–0	#12 Clemson	South Bend, IN
7:00 p.m. EST	Ian Aschieris 2', 88'	Report		Stadium: Alumni Stadium; Attendance: 191; Referee: Nick Balcer

October 31	#6 Virginia	0–2	#11 Pittsburgh	Charlottesville, VA
7:00 p.m. EST		Report	Robby Dambrot (yellow card) 12'; Jackson Walti (yellow card) 15'; Javi Pérez (yellow card) 22'; Edward Kizza 62', 79'; Joshua Gaspari (yellow card) 65'; Marcony Pimentel (yellow card) 69'	Stadium: Klöckner Stadium; Attendance: 510

October 31	#7 Virginia Tech	3–1	#10 Syracuse	Blacksburg, VA
7:00 p.m. EST	David Sanz 17'; Kristo Strickler 56'; Sivert Haugli (yellow card) 82'; James Kasak (yellow card) 86'; Nico Quashie 88'	Report	Hendrik Hilpert (yellow card) 39'; Ryan Raposo 84'; Hugo Delhommelle (yellow card) 87'	Stadium: Thompson Field; Attendance: 294; Referee: Karl Kummer

=== Quarterfinals ===
November 4	#1 Wake Forest	2–0	#8 NC State	Winston-Salem, NC
1:00 p.m. EST	Omir Fernandez 12', (yellow card) 88'; Sam Raben (yellow card) 9'; Machop Chol 19'; Holland Rula (yellow card) 67'; Michael DeShields (yellow card) 88'	Report	Aidan Foster (yellow card) 55'; Pepe Garcia (yellow card) 58'; Alex Bautista (yellow card) 88'	Stadium: Spry Stadium; Attendance: 2,037; Referee: John Brady

November 4	#4 Louisville	1–0	#5 Notre Dame	Louisville, KY
1:00 p.m. EST	Cameron Wheeler (yellow card) 64'; Tate Schmitt 85'	Report		Stadium: Lynn Stadium; Attendance: 667; Referee: Tony DeLois

November 4	#3 Duke	0–0 (a.e.t.) (4–3 p)	#11 Pittsburgh	Durham, NC
1:00 p.m. EST	Ciaran McKenna (yellow card) 58' (yellow-red card) 61'; Daniele Proch (yellow card) 92'	Report	Jackson Walti (yellow card) 86'	Stadium: Koskinen Stadium; Attendance: 342; Referee: Chris Penso
	Penalties
	Daniele Proch (penalty scored); Daniel Wright (penalty scored); Kristofer Gardarsson (penalty scored); Will Pulisic (penalty scored)		Javi Pérez (penalty scored); Jose Arbona (penalty scored); Rodrigo Almeida (penalty scored); Jackson Walti (penalty missed); Joshua Gaspari (penalty missed)

November 4	#2 North Carolina	3–0	#7 Virginia Tech	Cary, NC
1:00 p.m. EST	Jeremy Kelly 12'; Mauricio Pineda 37'; Jack Skahan 74'	Report		Stadium: WakeMed Soccer Park; Attendance: 507; Referee: Mark Gorak

=== Semifinals ===
November 7	#1 Wake Forest	1–2 (a.e.t.)	#4 Louisville	Winston-Salem, NC
7:00 p.m. EST	Joey DeZart 51'	Report	Elijah Amo (yellow card) 39' 97'; Haji Abdikadir 43'; Tate Schmitt (yellow card) 90'; Izaiah Jennings (yellow card) 93'	Stadium: Spry Stadium; Attendance: 2,117; Referee: David Erbacher

November 7	#2 North Carolina	2–1	#3 Duke	Cary, NC
7:00 p.m. EST	Giovanni Montesdeoca 28'; Nils Bruening (yellow card) 69'; Jelani Pieters 86'	Report	Issa Rayyan 86'	Stadium: WakeMed Soccer Park; Attendance: 586; Referee: Nikola Aleksic

=== Finals ===
November 11	#4 Louisville	1–0	#2 North Carolina	Cary, NC
12:00 p.m. EST	Cherif Dieye 28'; William Portman (yellow card) 52'; Cody Cochran (yellow card) 67'; Lamine Conte (yellow card) 68'; Pedro Fonseca (yellow card) 82'	Report		Stadium: Sahlen's Stadium; Attendance: 1,402; Referee: Mike Stutt

== Statistics ==
=== Goalscorers ===
2 Goals

- (United States) Ian Aschieris – Notre Dame
- (Uganda) Edward Kizza – Pittsburgh

1 Goal

- (Kenya) Haji Abdikadir – Louisville
- (United States) Elijah Amo – Louisville
- (United States) Alex Bautista – NC State
- (United States) Abe Bibas – Boston College
- (United States) Machop Chol – Wake Forest
- (United States) Joey DeZart – Wake Forest
- (Senegal) Cherif Dieye – Louisville
- (United States) Omir Fernandez – Wake Forest
- (United States) Jeremy Kelly – North Carolina
- (United States) David Loera – NC State
- (United States) Giovanni Montesdeoca – North Carolina
- (United States) Jelani Peters – North Carolina
- (United States) Mauricio Pineda – North Carolina
- (Canada) Ryan Raposo – Syracuse
- (United States) Issa Rayyan – Duke
- (United States) David Sanz – Virginia Tech
- (United States) Tate Schmitt – Louisville
- (United States) Jack Skahan – North Carolina
- (United States) Kristo Strickler – Virginia Tech
- (United States) Brad Sweeney – NC State
- (United States) Nico Quashie – Virginia Tech

== All-Tournament team ==
**ACC Men's Soccer All-Tournament team**

Will Pulisic, Duke
Brandon Williamson, Duke
Lamine Conte, Louisville
Cherif Dieye, Louisville
Ziyad Fekri, Louisville
Jake Gelnovatch, Louisville
**Tate Schmitt, Louisville**
Nils Bruening, North Carolina
Alex Comsia, North Carolina
John Nelson, North Carolina
Machop Chol, Wake Forest
Sam Raben, Wake Forest

MVP in Bold

== See also ==
- Atlantic Coast Conference
- 2018 Atlantic Coast Conference men's soccer season
- 2018 NCAA Division I men's soccer season
- 2018 NCAA Division I Men's Soccer Championship
