= 2018 Duke Blue Devils men's soccer team =

American college soccer season

2018 Duke Blue Devils men's soccer

John Rennie Nike Invitational Champions

NCAA Tournament, Third Round
- Conference: Atlantic Coast Conference
- U. Soc. Coaches poll: No. 11
- TopDrawerSoccer.com: No. 13
- Record: 11–7–2 (5–3–0 ACC)
- Head coach: John Kerr (11th season)
- Assistant coaches: Michael Brady (11th season); Chris Rich (4th season)
- Home stadium: Koskinen Stadium

2018 ACC men's soccer standings
	Conf.					Overall
Team	W		L		T	W		L		T
Atlantic
No. 6 Wake Forest +	7	–	1	–	0	18	–	3	–	0
No. 16 Louisville ‡	4	–	2	–	2	11	–	5	–	3
NC State +	2	–	4	–	2	10	–	7	–	3
Boston College	2	–	5	–	1	4	–	8	–	4
Syracuse +	1	–	4	–	3	7	–	7	–	4
Clemson	2	–	6	–	0	7	–	9	–	1
Coastal
No. 14 North Carolina +	6	–	1	–	0	14	–	4	–	1
No. 11 Duke +	5	–	3	–	0	11	–	7	–	2
No. 8 Notre Dame +	4	–	3	–	1	11	–	7	–	3
No. 15 Virginia +	3	–	2	–	2	10	–	4	–	3
No. 17 Virginia Tech +	3	–	4	–	1	11	–	7	–	3
Pittsburgh	2	–	6	–	0	8	–	10	–	1
‡ – 2018 ACC Tournament champion + – Invited to the 2018 NCAA Division I Men's Soccer Championship; As of December 11, 2018; Rankings from United Soccer Coaches; Source:The ACC

The 2018 Duke Blue Devils men's soccer team represented Duke University during the 2018 NCAA Division I men's soccer season. The Blue Devils were led by head coach John Kerr, in his eleventh season. They played home games at Koskinen Stadium. The team was founded in 1935 and currently plays in the Atlantic Coast Conference.

== Background ==
The 2017 Duke men's soccer team finished the season with a 13–4–3 overall record and a 4–3–1 ACC record. The Blue Devils were seeded fourth–overall in the 2017 ACC Men's Soccer Tournament, where they lost to Clemson in the Quarterfinals. The Blue Devils earned an at-large bid into the 2017 NCAA Division I Men's Soccer Tournament. As the sixth–overall seed in the tournament, Duke hosted FIU in the Second Round. Duke won 2–1 and progressed to face Fordham at home. Duke was upset on penalties after the game ended 2–2 to end their season.

At the end of the season, three Blue Devils men's soccer players were selected in the 2018 MLS SuperDraft: Brian White, Carter Manley and Markus Fjørtoft.

== Player movement ==
=== Players leaving ===
Name	Number	Pos.	Height	Weight	Year	Hometown	Reason for departure
Erik Hanson	0	GK	6'4"	200	Graduate Student	Mechanicsburg, PA	Graduated
Carter Manley	2	DF	5'11"	170	Senior	Elkridge, MD	Declared for 2018 MLS SuperDraft; selected 23rd overall by Minnesota United FC
Kevon Black	4	DF	6'0"	175	Senior	Toronto, CAN	Graduated
CC Uche	5	DF	6'1"	175	Sophomore	Lawrenceville, GA	N/A
Cameron Moseley	6	MF	6'4"	208	Senior	Duluth, GA	Graduated
Noah Snyder	13	MF	6'0"	175	Senior	Warrington, PA	Graduated
Markus Fjørtoft	21	DF	6'5"	205	Senior	Asker, NOR	Declared for 2018 MLS SuperDraft; selected 45th overall by Seattle Sounders FC
Brian White	24	MF	5'11"	180	Senior	Flemington, NJ	Declared for 2018 MLS SuperDraft; selected 16th overall by New York Red Bulls
Cody Brinkman	25	MF	5'11"	180	Senior	Durham, NC	Graduated
Joe Ohaus	30	GK	6'0"	180	Senior	Westfield, NJ	Graduated

=== Players arriving ===
Name	Nat.	Hometown	Club	TDS Rating
Cyril Engmann; FW	USA	Shoreline, WA	Crossfire Premier SC	3/5 stars
Eliot Hamill; GK	USA	Scarsdale, NY	Golden Touch Soccer	N/A
Conor Kelly; MF	USA	Rumson, NJ	Cedar Stars Academy	3/5 stars
Seth Kuhn; MF	USA	Wyomissing, PA	Philadelphia Union	3/5 stars
Ian Murphy; DF	USA	Redlands, CA	Redlands East Valley	4/5 stars
Issa Rayyan; FW	USA	Grand Blanc, MI	Philadelphia Union	3/5 stars
Aedan Stanley; DF	USA	Columbia, IL	St. Louis FC	4/5 stars

== Squad ==
=== Roster ===
Updated August 6, 2018

Note: Flags indicate national team as defined under FIFA eligibility rules; some limited exceptions apply. Players may hold more than one non-FIFA nationality.

No.	Pos.	Nation	Player
0	GK	(United States) USA	Michael Ries
00	GK	(United States) USA	Eliot Hamill
1	GK	(United States) USA	Will Pulisic
3	DF	(Canada) CAN	Oliver Spring
5	DF	(United States) USA	Aedan Stanley
6	MF	(Germany) GER	Kevin Feucht
7	MF	(Denmark) DEN	Torbjørn Alseth
8	MF	(Scotland) SCO	Ciaran McKenna
9	MF	(Italy) ITA	Daniele Proch
10	FW	(United States) USA	Suniel Veerakone
11	DF	(Austria) AUT	Max Moser
12	MF	(United States) USA	Colby Agu
13	DF	(United States) USA	Ian Murphy
14	MF	(Iceland) ISL	Kristófer Garðarsson

No.	Pos.	Nation	Player
15	MF	(Peru) PER	Miguel Yzaga
16	FW	(United States) USA	Daniel Wright
17	MF	(United States) USA	Issa Rayyan
18	DF	(Austria) AUT	Matthias Frick
19	MF	(United States) USA	Brandon Williamson
20	FW	(Norway) NOR	Sivert Daehlie
21	MF	(United States) USA	Seth Kuhn
22	MF	(United States) USA	Conor Kelly
23	MF	(Argentina) ARG	Micolas Macri
25	FW	(United States) USA	Nii Engmann
26	DF	(United States) USA	Max Feldman
27	DF	(United States) USA	Wilhelm Jacques
28	MF	(United States) USA	Jack Doran
29	DF	(United States) USA	Stephen O'Connell

=== Team management ===
Position	Staff
Athletic director	(United States) Kevin White
Head coach	(Canada) John Kerr
Associate head coach	(England) Michael Brady
Assistant coach and recruiting coordinator	(United States) Chris Rich
Volunteer Assistant coach	(England) Kieran Hall
Volunteer Director of Operations	(United States) Noah McKonon
Volunteer Director of Operations	(United States) Sonny Mukungu

== Schedule ==
Date Time, TV	Rank^{#}	Opponent^{#}	Result	Record	Site (Attendance) City, State
Exhibition
August 10*; 4:00 pm	No. 10	No. 11 Clemson	T 0–0	– (–)	Koskinen Stadium; Durham, NC
August 15*; 6:00 pm	No. 10	at South Carolina	T 1–1	– (–)	Stone Stadium; Columbia, SC
August 18*; 7:00 pm	No. 10	NC State	W 1–0	– (–)	Koskinen Stadium; Durham, NC
Regular season
August 24*; 7:30 pm	No. 10	FIU; John Rennie Nike Invitational	W 3–1	1–0–0 (0–0–0)	Koskinen Stadium (1,087); Durham, NC
August 26*; 2:30 pm	No. 10	Vermont; John Rennie Nike Invitational	W 3–2 ^{OT}	2–0–0 (0–0–0)	Koskinen Stadium (502); Durham, NC
August 31*; 8:30 pm	No. 2	at San Diego	W 4–1	3–0–0 (0–0–0)	Torero Stadium (710); San Diego, CA
September 9; 2:00 pm	No. 2	at No. 7 Louisville	L 0–3	3–1–0 (0–1–0)	Lynn Stadium (1,104); Louisville, KY
September 18*; 7:00 pm	No. 9	Georgetown	L 0–1	3–2–0 (0–1–0)	Koskinen Stadium (454); Durham, NC
September 21; 7:00 pm	No. 9	Boston College	W 3–2	4–2–0 (1–1–0)	Koskinen Stadium (710); Durham, NC
September 25*; 7:00 pm	No. 15	George Washington	T 0–0 ^{2OT}	4–2–1 (1–1–0)	Koskinen Stadium (359); Durham, NC
September 29; 7:30 pm	No. 15	at No. 1 Wake Forest	L 2–4	4–3–1 (1–2–0)	Spry Stadium (4,937); Winston–Salem, NC
October 2*; 7:00 pm	No. 23	Wofford	W 4–2	5–3–1 (1–2–0)	Koskinen Stadium (372); Durham, NC
October 5; 7:00 pm	No. 23	at No. 10 Virginia	W 2–0	6–3–1 (2–2–0)	Klöckner Stadium (2,129); Charlottesville, VA
October 9*; 7:00 pm	No. 17	Campbell	W 1–0	7–3–1 (2–2–0)	Koskinen Stadium (349); Durham, NC
October 12; 7:00 pm	No. 17	No. 9 Notre Dame	W 3–2	8–3–1 (3–2–0)	Koskinen Stadium (892); Durham, NC
October 16*; 7:00 pm	No. 14	High Point	L 0–1	8–4–1 (3–2–0)	Koskinen Stadium (493); Durham, NC
October 19; 7:00 pm	No. 14	Pittsburgh	W 3–1	9–4–1 (4–2–0)	Koskinen Stadium (701); Durham, NC
October 23; 7:00 pm	No. 14	No. 5 North Carolina; Rivalry	L 0–1	9–5–1 (4–3–0)	Koskinen Stadium (1,600); Durham, NC
October 26; 7:00 pm	No. 14	at No. 18 Virginia Tech	W 2–0	10–5–1 (5–3–0)	Thompson Field (274); Blacksburg, VA
ACC Tournament
November 4; 1:00 pm	(3) No. 8	(11) Pittsburgh; Quarterfinal	T 0–0 (4–3 PKs) ^{2OT}	10–5–2	Koskinen Stadium (342); Durham, NC
November 7; 7:00 pm	(3) No. 8	(2) No. 4 North Carolina; Semifinal, Rivalry	L 1–2	10–6–2	WakeMed Soccer Park (586); Raleigh, NC
NCAA Tournament
November 18*; 6:00 pm	(6) No. 10	Pacific; Second Round	W 1–0	11–6–2	Koskinen Stadium (392); Durham, NC
November 24*; 7:00 pm	(6) No. 10	(11) No. 15 Maryland; Third Round	L 0–2	11–7–2	Koskinen Stadium (362); Durham, NC
*Non-conference game. ^{#}Rankings from United Soccer Coaches. (#) Tournament seedings in parentheses.

== Awards and honors ==
Recipient	Award	Date	Ref.
Issa Rayyan	Atlantic Coast Conference Men's Soccer Freshman of the Year	November 7, 2018	
Daniele Proch	All-ACC First Team	November 7, 2018	
Will Pulisic	All-ACC Second Team	November 7, 2018	
Brandom Williamson	All-ACC Second Team	November 7, 2018	
Issa Rayyan	All-ACC Second Team	November 7, 2018	
Ciaran McKenna	All-ACC Third Team	November 7, 2018	
Issa Rayyan	All-ACC Freshman Team	November 7, 2018	
Aedan Stanley	All-ACC Freshman Team	November 7, 2018	
Will Pulisic	All-ACC Tournament Team	November 11, 2018	
Brandon Williamson	All-ACC Tournament Team	November 11, 2018	
Daniele Proch	United Soccer Coaches Second Team All-American	December 6, 2018	

== 2019 MLS Super Draft ==
Duke did not have any players selected in the 2019 MLS SuperDraft.

== Rankings ==
Ranking movement Legend: ██ Improvement in ranking. ██ Decrease in ranking. ██ Not ranked the previous week. RV=Others receiving votes.
Poll	Pre	Wk 1	Wk 2	Wk 3	Wk 4	Wk 5	Wk 6	Wk 7	Wk 8	Wk 9	Wk 10	Wk 11	Wk 12	Wk 13	Wk 14	Wk 15	Wk 16	Final
United Soccer	10	2	2	10	9	15	23	17	14	14	8	8	10	None Released				11
TopDrawer Soccer	13	13	8	6	9	8	16	17	15	5	11	10	8	14	11	13	13	13
