= 2018 North Carolina Tar Heels men's soccer team =

American college soccer season

2018 North Carolina Tar Heels men's soccer

2018 U.S. Soccer Spring Men's College Program champions

NCAA Tournament, Second Round
- Conference: Atlantic Coast Conference
- U. Soc. Coaches poll: No. 14
- TopDrawerSoccer.com: No. 19
- Record: 14–3–1 (6–1–0 ACC)
- Head coach: Carlos Somoano (7th season)
- Assistant coaches: Cristian Neagu (3rd season); Grant Porter (7th season); Joe Scachetti (3rd season)
- Home stadium: Fetzer Field (under constriction), home games to be split between WakeMed Soccer Park, Bryan Park, and Koskinen Stadium

2018 ACC men's soccer standings
	Conf.					Overall
Team	W		L		T	W		L		T
Atlantic
No. 6 Wake Forest +	7	–	1	–	0	18	–	3	–	0
No. 16 Louisville ‡	4	–	2	–	2	11	–	5	–	3
NC State +	2	–	4	–	2	10	–	7	–	3
Boston College	2	–	5	–	1	4	–	8	–	4
Syracuse +	1	–	4	–	3	7	–	7	–	4
Clemson	2	–	6	–	0	7	–	9	–	1
Coastal
No. 14 North Carolina +	6	–	1	–	0	14	–	4	–	1
No. 11 Duke +	5	–	3	–	0	11	–	7	–	2
No. 8 Notre Dame +	4	–	3	–	1	11	–	7	–	3
No. 15 Virginia +	3	–	2	–	2	10	–	4	–	3
No. 17 Virginia Tech +	3	–	4	–	1	11	–	7	–	3
Pittsburgh	2	–	6	–	0	8	–	10	–	1
‡ – 2018 ACC Tournament champion + – Invited to the 2018 NCAA Division I Men's Soccer Championship; As of December 11, 2018; Rankings from United Soccer Coaches; Source:The ACC

The 2018 North Carolina Tar Heels men's soccer team represented the University of North Carolina at Chapel Hill during the 2018 NCAA Division I men's soccer season. It was the 72nd season of the university fielding a program.

The 2018 season saw North Carolina win the inaugural U.S. Soccer Spring Men's College Program.

Fetzer Field was undergoing construction during the 2018 soccer season so the Tar Heels split their home matches between three stadiums:WakeMed Soccer Park, Bryan Park, and Koskinen Stadium.

== Background ==
The 2017 North Carolina men's soccer team finished the season with a 17–4–1 overall record and a 6–1–1 ACC record. The Tar Heels were seeded second–overall in the 2017 ACC Men's Soccer Tournament. The Tar Heels were upset in the Quarterfinals by the seventh seed Notre Dame. The Tar Heels earned an at-large bid into the 2017 NCAA Division I Men's Soccer Tournament. As the third-overall seed in the tournament, the Tar Heels defeated, UNC Wilmington, SMU, and Fordham before losing to Indiana in the College Cup.

At the end of the season, one Tar Heels men's soccer player was selected in the 2018 MLS SuperDraft: Alan Winn.

== Player movement ==
=== Departures ===
Name	Number	Pos.	Height	Weight	Year	Hometown	Reason for departure
Drew Murphy	9	MF	6'2"	170	Senior	Palos Verdes, CA	Graduated
Zach Wright	10	FW	5'11"	165	Senior	Smithville, TX	Graduated
David October	11	MF	6'0"	161	Senior	Cambridge, UK	Graduated
Alan Winn	18	FW	5'11"	172	Senior	Garland, TX	Declared for 2018 MLS SuperDraft; drafted 25th overall by Colorado Rapids

=== Incoming transfers ===
Name	Number	Pos.	Height	Weight	Year	Hometown	Notes

=== 2018 recruiting class ===
Name	Nat.	Hometown	Club	TDS Rating
Sebastian Chalbaud; MF	VEN	Venezuela	Cedar Stars Academy	2/5 stars
Milo Garvanian; MF	USA	Albuquerque, NM	Colorado Rapids	3/5 stars
Roman Knox; MF	USA	Shawnee, KS	Sporting Kansas City Academy	3/5 stars
Antonio Lopez; MF	USA	Austin, TX	Lonestar SC	3/5 stars
Jake Walker; DF	USA	Davie, FL	Weston FC	3/5 stars
Jaxson Watermann; FW	USA	Columbia, SC	Carolina Rapids	3/5 stars

== Squad ==
=== Roster ===
Updated August 6, 2018

Note: Flags indicate national team as defined under FIFA eligibility rules; some limited exceptions apply. Players may hold more than one non-FIFA nationality.

No.	Pos.	Nation	Player
1	GK	(United States) USA	James Pyle
2	MF	(United States) USA	Mauricio Pineda
4	DF	(Canada) CAN	Alex Comsia
5	DF	(United States) USA	John Nelson
6	DF	(United States) USA	Matt Constant
7	FW	(United States) USA	Lucas Del Rosario
8	MF	(United States) USA	Jack Skahan
9	MF	(United States) USA	Drew Murphy
10	FW	(United States) USA	Giovanni Montesdeoca
11	MF	(United States) USA	Antonio Lopez
12	GK	(United States) USA	Drew Romig
13	DF	(Norway) NOR	Henrik Bredeli
15	DF	(United States) USA	Will Campbell
16	MF	(United States) USA	David Mejia
17	MF	(United States) USA	Jesus Bolivar
18	MF	(Wales) WAL	Sam Jones

No.	Pos.	Nation	Player
19	MF	(United States) USA	Martin Salas
20	MF	(United States) USA	Alex Moztarzadeh
21	FW	(United States) USA	Alex Rose
22	MF	(United States) USA	Dominic Jensen
23	DF	(United States) USA	Jake Walker
25	DF	(New Zealand) NZL	Liam Williams
26	FW	(United States) USA	Jelani Pieters
27	DF	(United States) USA	Mark Salas
28	MF	(United States) USA	Raul Aguilera
29	MF	(United States) USA	Jeremy Kelly
30	GK	(United States) USA	Alec Smir
31	FW	(Lithuania) LTU	Julius Momkus
32	MF	(United States) USA	Milo Garvanian
33	FW	(United States) USA	Jaxson Watermann
35	DF	(England) ENG	Charlie Forecast
38	MF	(United States) USA	Roman Knox
39	FW	(England) ENG	Taff Wadda

=== Team management ===
Position	Staff
Athletic director	Bubba Cunningham
Head coach	Carlos Somoano
Assistant coach	Grant Porter
Assistant coach	Will Clayton
Volunteer Assistant Coach	Joe Scachetti

== Schedule ==
Date Time, TV	Rank^{#}	Opponent^{#}	Result	Record	Site (Attendance) City, State
Exhibition
August 12*; 7:00 pm	No. 3	at No. 18 Coastal Carolina	W 4–0	– (–)	Coastal Carolina University Soccer Field; Conway, SC
August 17*; 7:00 pm	No. 3	Stetson	W 4–1	– (–)	WakeMed Soccer Park; Cary, NC
August 19*; 7:00 pm	No. 3	Presbyterian	W 2–1	– (–)	Bryan Park; Greensboro, NC
Regular season
August 24*; 7:30 pm	No. 3	ETSU	W 1–0	1–0–0 (0–0–0)	Bryan Park (367); Greensboro, NC
August 26*; 7:30 pm	No. 3	No. 2 Indiana	L 0–1	1–1–0 (0–0–0)	WakeMed Soccer Park (2,864); Cary, NC
August 31*; 7:00 pm	No. 12	at William & Mary	W 6–1	2–1–0 (0–0–0)	Albert–Daly Field (661); Williamsburg, VA
September 3*; 7:00 pm	No. 12	Jacksonville	W 2–0	3–1–0 (0–0–0)	Koskinen Stadium (239); Durham, NC
September 8; 7:00 pm	No. 5	Pittsburgh	W 2–1 ^{2OT}	4–1–0 (1–0–0)	Koskinen Stadium (572); Durham, NC
September 11*; 7:00 pm	No. 3	Davidson	W 1–0	5–1–0 (1–0–0)	Alumni Soccer Stadium (815); Davidson, NC
September 18*; 7:00 pm	No. 3	at UNCG	Cancelled due to Hurricane Florence	0–0–0 (0–0–0)	UNCG Soccer Stadium; Greensboro, NC
September 21; 7:00 pm	No. 3	at No. 8 Notre Dame	W 1–0 ^{2OT}	6–1–0 (2–0–0)	Alumni Stadium (1,724); South Bend, IN
September 28; 7:00 pm	No. 3	Clemson	W 2–0	7–1–0 (3–0–0)	WakeMed Soccer Park (1,876); Cary, NC
October 2*; 7:00 pm	No. 3	No. 12 UNCW	W 1–0	8–1–0 (3–0–0)	WakeMed Soccer Park (1,017); Cary, NC
October 6; 7:00 pm	No. 3	No. 19 Virginia Tech	W 2–1	9–1–0 (4–0–0)	Koskinen Stadium (2,074); Durham, NC
October 9*; 7:00 pm	No. 1	at Old Dominion	T 1–1 ^{2OT}	9–1–1 (4–0–0)	Old Dominion Soccer Complex (775); Norfolk, VA
October 12; 7:00 pm	No. 1	at NC State; Rivalry	L 0–1	9–2–1 (4–1–0)	Dail Soccer Field (3,229); Raleigh, NC
October 16*; 7:00 pm	No. 5	Winthrop	W 4–0	10–2–1 (4–1–0)	WakeMed Soccer Park (244); Cary, NC
October 19; 7:00 pm	No. 5	at Boston College	W 2–0	11–2–1 (5–1–0)	Newton Soccer Complex (572); Chestnut Hill, MA
October 23; 7:00 pm	No. 5	at No. 14 Duke; Rivalry	W 1–0	12–2–1 (6–1–0)	Koskinen Stadium (1,600); Durham, NC
ACC Tournament
November 4; 1:00 pm	(2) No. 4	(7) No. 22 Virginia Tech; Quarterfinal	W 3–0	13–2–1	WakeMed Soccer Park (507); Cary, NC
November 7; 7:00 pm	(2) No. 4	(3) No. 8 Duke; Semifinal, Rivalry	W 2–1	14–2–1	WakeMed Soccer Park (586); Cary, NC
November 11; 12:00 pm	(2) No. 4	(4) No. 10 Louisville; Final	L 0–1	14–3–1	Sahlen's Stadium (1,402); Cary, NC
NCAA Tournament
November 18*; 6:00 pm	(5) No. 6	James Madison; Second Round	L 1–2	14–4–1	WakeMed Soccer Park (850); Cary, NC
*Non-conference game. ^{#}Rankings from United Soccer Coaches. (#) Tournament seedings in parentheses.

== Awards and honors ==
Recipient	Award	Date	Ref.
Alex Comsia	MAC Hermann Trophy Watchlist	August 13, 2018	
Giovanni Montesdeoca	ACC Offensive Player of the Week	September 24, 2018	
Giovanni Montesdeoca	ACC Offensive Player of the Week	October 1, 2018	
Alex Comsia	ACC Defensive Player of the Week	October 1, 2018	
Alex Comsia	Defensive Player of the Year	November 7, 2018	
Nils Bruening	All-ACC First Team	November 7, 2018	
Alex Comsia	All-ACC First Team	November 7, 2018	
Mauricio Pineda	All-ACC First Team	November 7, 2018	
James Pyle	All-ACC First Team	November 7, 2018	
John Nelson	All-ACC Second Team	November 7, 2018	
Jack Skahan	All-ACC Third Team	November 7, 2018	
Nils Bruening	All-ACC Tournament Team	November 11, 2018	
Alex Comsia	All-ACC Tournament Team	November 11, 2018	
John Nelson	All-ACC Tournament Team	November 11, 2018	
Alex Comsia	United Soccer Coaches First Team All-American	December 6, 2018	
Mauricio Pineda	United Soccer Coaches Second Team All-American	December 6, 2018	

== 2019 MLS Super Draft ==
Player	Team	Round	Pick #	Position
John Nelson	FC Dallas	1	10	DF

== Rankings ==
Ranking movement Legend: ██ Improvement in ranking. ██ Decrease in ranking. ██ Not ranked the previous week. RV=Others receiving votes.
Poll	Pre	Wk 1	Wk 2	Wk 3	Wk 4	Wk 5	Wk 6	Wk 7	Wk 8	Wk 9	Wk 10	Wk 11	Wk 12	Wk 13	Wk 14	Wk 15	Wk 16	Final
United Soccer	3	12	5	3	3	3	3	1	5	5	4	4	6	None Released				14
TopDrawer Soccer	4	4	6	10	10	9	7	8	5	7	6	5	4	5	19	19	19	19
