= 2018 Louisville Cardinals men's soccer team =

American college soccer season

2018 Louisville Cardinals men's soccer

2018 ACC Men's Soccer Tournament

NCAA Tournament, Second Round
- Conference: Atlantic Coast Conference
- U. Soc. Coaches poll: No. 16
- TopDrawerSoccer.com: No. 18
- Record: 11–5–3 (4–2–2 ACC)
- Head coach: Ken Lolla (13th season)
- Assistant coaches: Danny Cepero (6th season); John Michael Hayden (3rd season)
- Home stadium: Lynn Stadium

2018 ACC men's soccer standings
	Conf.					Overall
Team	W		L		T	W		L		T
Atlantic
No. 6 Wake Forest +	7	–	1	–	0	18	–	3	–	0
No. 16 Louisville ‡	4	–	2	–	2	11	–	5	–	3
NC State +	2	–	4	–	2	10	–	7	–	3
Boston College	2	–	5	–	1	4	–	8	–	4
Syracuse +	1	–	4	–	3	7	–	7	–	4
Clemson	2	–	6	–	0	7	–	9	–	1
Coastal
No. 14 North Carolina +	6	–	1	–	0	14	–	4	–	1
No. 11 Duke +	5	–	3	–	0	11	–	7	–	2
No. 8 Notre Dame +	4	–	3	–	1	11	–	7	–	3
No. 15 Virginia +	3	–	2	–	2	10	–	4	–	3
No. 17 Virginia Tech +	3	–	4	–	1	11	–	7	–	3
Pittsburgh	2	–	6	–	0	8	–	10	–	1
‡ – 2018 ACC Tournament champion + – Invited to the 2018 NCAA Division I Men's Soccer Championship; As of December 11, 2018; Rankings from United Soccer Coaches; Source:The ACC

The 2018 Louisville Cardinals men's soccer team represented University of Louisville during the 2018 NCAA Division I men's soccer season. The Cardinals were led by head coach Ken Lolla, in his thirteenth season. They played home games at Lynn Stadium. This was the team's 40th season playing organized men's college soccer and their 5th playing in the Atlantic Coast Conference.

== Background ==
The 2017 Louisville Cardinals team had a record of 13–2–5 overall and 5–2–1 in the Atlantic Coast Conference. The team received a bye into the quarterfinals of the 2017 ACC Men's Soccer Tournament before losing to Virginia on penalties. The Carindals earned an at-large bid to the 2017 NCAA Division I Men's Soccer Championship, where they were eliminated in the quarterfinals by Akron.

== Player movement ==
=== Players leaving ===
Name	Number	Pos.	Height	Weight	Year	Hometown	Reason for departure
Mohamed Thiaw	10	FW	6'2"	176	Senior	Lexington, KY	Declared for 2018 MLS SuperDraft, selected 35th overall by the San Jose Earthquakes
Tim Kübel	27	DF	5'9"	165	Senior	Stuttgart, GER	Declared for 2018 MLS SuperDraft, selected 28th overall by Toronto FC
Sawyer Edwards	11	MF	6'2"	181	Senior	Parker, CO	Graduated
Joey Kunkel	24	DF	5'11"	170	Senior	Cincinnati, OH	Graduated

=== Players arriving ===
Name	Nat.	Hometown	Club	TDS Rating
Haji Abdikadir; FW	KEN	Louisville, KY	United 1996 FC	4/5 stars
Chaz Andriot; MF	USA	Shelbyville, KY	Indiana Fire Academy	3/5 stars
Jack Hickey; DF	USA	Richmond, KY	Shattuck St. Mayr's Academy	0/5 stars
Andrew Wangard; GK	USA	Bradenton, FL	San Jose Earthquakes Academy	2/5 stars

== Squad ==
=== Roster ===
Updated August 3, 2018

Note: Flags indicate national team as defined under FIFA eligibility rules; some limited exceptions apply. Players may hold more than one non-FIFA nationality.

No.	Pos.	Nation	Player
1	GK	USA	Will Meyer
2	DF	MAR	Ziyad Fekri
3	MF	GUI	Lamine Conte
4	FW	KEN	Haji Abdikadir
5	MF	SCO	Adam Wilson
6	MF	USA	Geoffrey Dee
7	MF	USA	Cameron Wheeler
8	MF	ENG	Hamam El-Fitouri
9	FW	JPN	Kino Ryosuke
10	FW	USA	Tate Schmitt
11	FW	USA	Chaz Andriot
12	MF	SEN	Cherif Dieye
13	MF	USA	Chris DeMartino
14	DF	ENG	William Portman

No.	Pos.	Nation	Player
15	DF	USA	Connor Brazil
16	MF	USA	JP Armbruster
17	MF	USA	Elijah Amo
18	DF	USA	Jack Hickey
19	FW	BRA	Pedro Fonseca
20	MF	USA	Cody Cochran
21	FW	USA	Watterson Young
22	DF	ENG	Liam Bennett
23	FW	USA	Izaiah Jennings
27	DF	FRA	Louka Massett
28	GK	USA	William Howard
30	GK	USA	Andrew Wangard
31	GK	USA	Jake Gelnovatch

=== Team management ===
Position	Staff
Head coach	Ken Lolla
Assistant coach	Donovan Dowling
Assistant coach	John Michael Hayden
Graduate Manager	Nick Blackwell
Volunteer Assistant Coach	Robbe Tarver
Director of Operations	James Kusak

== Schedule ==
Date Time, TV	Rank^{#}	Opponent^{#}	Result	Record	Site (Attendance) City, State
Exhibition
August 15*; 7:00 pm	No. 6	at No. 2 Indiana	W 1–0	– (–)	Grand Park; Westfield, IN
August 18*; 5:00 pm	No. 6	Evansville	W 3–0	– (–)	Lynn Stadium (513); Louisville, KY
Regular season
August 24*; 7:30 pm	No. 6	St. Bonaventure	W 2–1	1–0–0 (0–0–0)	Lynn Stadium (1,601); Louisville, KY
August 28*; 7:30 pm	No. 9	Georgia State	W 1–0	2–0–0 (0–0–0)	Lynn Stadium (1,095); Louisville, KY
August 31*; 7:30 pm	No. 9	Saint Louis	Canceled	0–0–0 (0–0–0)	Lynn Stadium; Louisville, KY
September 4*; 7:30 pm	No. 7	at Kentucky; Rivalry	L 0–3	2–1–0 (0–0–0)	Wendell & Vickie Bell Soccer Complex (1,827); Lexington, KY
September 9; 2:00 pm	No. 7	No. 2 Duke	W 3–0	3–1–0 (1–0–0)	Lynn Stadium (1,104); Louisville, KY
September 14; 7:00 pm	No. 7	at Boston College	W 1–0	4–1–0 (2–0–0)	Newton Soccer Complex (768); Chestnut Hill, MA
September 18*; 7:30 pm	No. 6	Charlotte	T 2–2 ^{2OT}	4–1–1 (2–0–0)	Lynn Stadium (1,151); Louisville, KY
September 21; 7:30 pm	No. 6	Pittsburgh	W 1–0	5–1–1 (3–0–0)	Lynn Stadium (1,604); Louisville, KY
September 25*; 4:00 pm	No. 6	at Georgetown	W 2–1	6–1–1 (3–0–0)	Shaw Field (395); Washington, D.C.
September 28; 7:00 pm	No. 6	at No. 12 NC State	T 2–2 ^{2OT}	6–1–2 (3–0–1)	Dail Soccer Stadium (1,255); Raleigh, NC
October 6; 7:00 pm	No. 6	at No. 15 Notre Dame	L 1–2 ^{OT}	6–2–2 (3–1–1)	Alumni Stadium (646); South Bend, IN
October 9*; 7:00 pm	No. 11	Georgia Southern	W 1–0	7–2–2 (3–1–1)	Lynn Stadium (1,207); Louisville, KY
October 12; 7:00 pm	No. 11	No. 24 Syracuse	T 2–2 ^{2OT}	7–2–3 (3–1–2)	Lynn Stadium (1,468); Louisville, KY
October 16*; 7:00 pm	No. 10	Lipscomb	L 2–3	7–3–3 (3–1–2)	Lynn Stadium (1,069); Louisville, KY
October 20; 7:00 pm	No. 10	Clemson	W 0–1 ^{2OT}	8–3–3 (4–1–2)	Lynn Stadium (1,808); Louisville, Kentucky
October 26; 7:00 pm	No. 17	at No. 1 Wake Forest	L 1–2 ^{OT}	8–4–3 (4–2–2)	Spry Stadium (1,165); Winston-Salem, NC
ACC Tournament
November 4; 1:00 pm	(4) No. 15	(5) No. 18 Notre Dame; Quarterfinal	W 1–0	9–4–3	Lynn Stadium (667); Louisville, KY
November 7; 7:00 pm	(4) No. 10	(1) No. 1 Wake Forest; Semifinal	W 2–1 ^{OT}	10–4–3	Spry Stadium (2,117); Winston-Salem, NC
November 11; 12:00 pm	(4) No. 10	(2) No. 4 North Carolina; Final	W 1–0	11–4–3	Sahlen's Stadium (1,402); Cary, NC
NCAA Tournament
November 18*; 5:00 pm	(4) No. 5	Michigan State; Second Round	L 1–2 ^{OT}	11–5–3	Lynn Stadium (1,491); Louisville, KY
*Non-conference game. ^{#}Rankings from United Soccer Coaches. (#) Tournament seedings in parentheses.

== Awards and honors ==
Recipient	Award	Date	Ref.
Tate Schmitt	All-ACC First Team	November 7, 2018	
Geoffrey Dee	All-ACC Second Team	November 7, 2018	
Cherif Dieye	All-ACC Third Team	November 7, 2018	
Lamine Conte	All-ACC Tournament Team	November 11, 2018	
Cherif Dieye	All-ACC Tournament Team	November 11, 2018	
Ziyad Fekri	All-ACC Tournament Team	November 11, 2018	
Jake Gelnovatch	All-ACC Tournament Team	November 11, 2018	
Tate Schmitt	All-ACC Tournament Team	November 11, 2018	
Tate Schmitt	ACC Tournament MVP	November 11, 2018	

== 2019 MLS SuperDraft ==
Player	Team	Round	Pick #	Position
Adam Wilson	Toronto FC	3	39	MF

== Rankings ==
Ranking movement Legend: ██ Improvement in ranking. ██ Decrease in ranking. ██ Not ranked the previous week. RV=Others receiving votes.
Poll	Pre	Wk 1	Wk 2	Wk 3	Wk 4	Wk 5	Wk 6	Wk 7	Wk 8	Wk 9	Wk 10	Wk 11	Wk 12	Wk 13	Wk 14	Wk 15	Wk 16	Final
United Soccer	6	9	7	7	6	6	6	11	10	17	15	10	5	None Released				16
TopDrawer Soccer	7	7	7	3	5	5	5	5	9	12	19	16	9	2	18	18	18	18
