= 2018 U.S. Soccer Spring Men's College Program =

- Number of teams: 6

Statistics
- Longest winning run: 5 games North Carolina (3/14/2018–4/21/2018)
- Longest unbeaten run: 5 games North Carolina (3/14/2018–4/21/2018)

Finals
- Duration: April 21, 2018
- Date: April 21, 2018
- Site: W. Dennie Spry Soccer Stadium; Winston-Salem, North Carolina
- Champions: North Carolina

Seasons
- 2019 →

The 2018 U.S. Soccer Spring Men's College Program was the inaugural edition of the U.S. Soccer Spring Men's College Program, a spring season competition run by the United States Soccer Federation in which American college soccer teams use IFAB rules instead of NCAA rules. The season began on March 7, 2018, and ran until April 21, 2018. The last round of matches were hosted by Wake Forest University.

Six universities participated in the program: Clemson, Duke, Georgetown, North Carolina, Virginia, and Wake Forest. Of these six programs, five are from the Atlantic Coast Conference, and all are located in the Southeastern United States or Mid-Atlantic regions.

== Rule differences ==
There were some notable rule difference between the two competitions:

- In NCAA soccer, matches use a countdown clock with stoppages in the clock if there is an extended stop of play. In the Spring College Program, an upward counting clock is employed, and the referee determines stoppage time.
- In NCAA soccer, there are unlimited substitutions and a match day roster up to 30 players. In the first half of a match, if a player is subbed off, they cannot return until the second half. In the second half, there are unlimited substitutions. In the Spring College Program, match day rosters cannot have more than 18 players, and there are a maximum of three substitutions the whole match. Players who are subbed off cannot return.
- In NCAA soccer, if the match is tied at the end of regulation, two-10 minute golden goal overtime periods are employed. If the match is still tied at the end of regulation, the match stands as a draw in regular season matches. In the Spring College Program, the draw stands at the end of regulation.
- In NCAA soccer, there can be up to three matches in a calendar week. In the Spring College Program, there is only one match per week.

== Participating teams ==
Locations of U.S. Soccer Spring Men's College Program teams for 2018.

== Table ==
Pos	Team	Pld	W	D	L	GF	GA	GD	Pts	Qualification
1	North Carolina (C)	5	5	0	0	14	2	+12	15	Champions
2	Wake Forest	5	2	0	3	4	8	−4	6	
3	Clemson	3	1	0	2	5	7	−2	3	
4	Georgetown	3	1	0	2	4	6	−2	3	
5	Virginia	3	1	0	2	4	6	−2	3	
6	Duke	3	1	0	2	3	5	−2	3	

(C) Champions

== See also ==
- 2018 NCAA Division I men's soccer season
- 2018 PDL season
- 2018 NPSL season
