= 2018 Virginia Cavaliers men's soccer team =

American college soccer season

2018 Virginia Cavaliers men's soccer

NCAA Tournament, Third Round
- Conference: Atlantic Coast Conference
- U. Soc. Coaches poll: No. 15
- TopDrawerSoccer.com: No. 11
- Record: 10–4–3 (3–3–2 ACC)
- Head coach: George Gelnovatch (23rd season)
- Assistant coaches: Matt Chulis (12th season); Terry Boss (5th season); Ryan Hopkins (1st season)
- Home stadium: Klöckner Stadium

2018 ACC men's soccer standings
	Conf.					Overall
Team	W		L		T	W		L		T
Atlantic
No. 6 Wake Forest +	7	–	1	–	0	18	–	3	–	0
No. 16 Louisville ‡	4	–	2	–	2	11	–	5	–	3
NC State +	2	–	4	–	2	10	–	7	–	3
Boston College	2	–	5	–	1	4	–	8	–	4
Syracuse +	1	–	4	–	3	7	–	7	–	4
Clemson	2	–	6	–	0	7	–	9	–	1
Coastal
No. 14 North Carolina +	6	–	1	–	0	14	–	4	–	1
No. 11 Duke +	5	–	3	–	0	11	–	7	–	2
No. 8 Notre Dame +	4	–	3	–	1	11	–	7	–	3
No. 15 Virginia +	3	–	2	–	2	10	–	4	–	3
No. 17 Virginia Tech +	3	–	4	–	1	11	–	7	–	3
Pittsburgh	2	–	6	–	0	8	–	10	–	1
‡ – 2018 ACC Tournament champion + – Invited to the 2018 NCAA Division I Men's Soccer Championship; As of December 11, 2018; Rankings from United Soccer Coaches; Source:The ACC

The 2018 Virginia Cavaliers men's soccer team represented University of Virginia during the 2018 NCAA Division I men's soccer season. The Cavaliers were led by head coach George Gelnovatch, in his twenty-third season. They played home games at Klöckner Stadium. This was the team's 78th season playing organized men's college soccer and their 66th playing in the Atlantic Coast Conference.

In addition, the Cavaliers were one of the six college soccer programs that participated in U.S. Soccer's 2018 Spring Men's College Soccer Program, which was held from March 4–April 21. This will be a series of competitive fixtures that use IFAB rules instead of NCAA rules for matches.

== Previous season ==
The 2017 Virginia Cavaliers team finished the season with a final overall record of 13–4–5, and final ACC record of 3–2–3. The Cavaliers were seeded sixth-overall in the 2017 ACC Men's Soccer Tournament, where they reached the final. In the ACC Championship Game, they lost on penalty kicks to Wake Forest. The Cavaliers earned an at-large bid into the 2017 NCAA Division I Men's Soccer Tournament, continuing their record streak of consecutive NCAA appearances going at 37 appearances. In the NCAA Tournament, Virginia was seeded 11th overall in the tournament, where they reached third round before losing to Fordham.

At the end of the season, four Cavaliers men's soccer players were selected in the 2018 MLS SuperDraft: Jeff Caldwell, Edward Opoku, Pablo Aguilar and Sheldon Sullivan.

== Offseason ==
=== Departures ===
Name	Number	Pos.	Height	Weight	Year	Hometown	Reason for departure
Jeff Caldwell	1	GK	6'3"	187	Senior	Todd, NC	Declared for 2018 MLS SuperDraft; selected 19th overall by New York City FC
Nate Odusote	4	DF	6'4"	189	Senior	North Haledon, NJ	Graduated
Hayes Fountain	6	MF	5'11"	181	(redshirt) Senior	Charlottesville, VA	Graduated
Bay Kurtz	7	MF	5'11"	171	Senior	Crown Point, IN	Graduated
Pablo Aguilar	8	MF	5'7"	150	(redshirt) Senior	Guatemala City, GUA	Declared for 2018 MLS SuperDraft; selected 59th overall by the Houston Dynamo
Edward Opoku	11	FW	5'7"	140	Junior	Millbrook, NY	Declared for 2018 MLS SuperDraft; selected 32nd overall by the Columbus Crew
Sheldon Sullivan	31	DF	5'9"	170	(redshirt) Senior	Stafford, VA	Declared for 2018 MLS SuperDraft; selected 66th overall by the Houston Dynamo

=== Incoming transfers ===
Name	Number	Pos.	Height	Weight	Year	Hometown	Notes
Marcel DaSilva	TBD	GK	5'8"	150	Junior	Manchester, New Hampshire	Transferred from Tulsa.

=== 2018 recruiting class ===
Name	Nat.	Hometown	High School	Club	Height	Weight	Commit date
Daryl Dike; FW	USA	Edmond, OK	Edmond North	Oklahoma FC			February 8, 2018
Daryl Dike; FW	Recruit star rankings: TDS: CSN: N/A ESPN: N/A						
Bret Halsey; MF	USA	Sterling, VA	Potomac Falls	Loudoun Soccer Club			April 20, 2017
Bret Halsey; MF	Recruit star rankings: TDS: CSN: N/A ESPN: N/A						
Aboubacar Keita; DF	USA	Columbus, OH	—N/a	Columbus Crew U-17s			January 29, 2018
Aboubacar Keita; DF	Recruit star rankings: TDS: CSN: N/A ESPN: N/A						
Daniel Steedman; MF	SCO	Glasgow, Scotland	—N/a	Charlotte Independence			
Daniel Steedman; MF	TDS:						

== Roster ==
Note: Flags indicate national team as defined under FIFA eligibility rules; some limited exceptions apply. Players may hold more than one non-FIFA nationality.

No.	Pos.	Nation	Player
0	GK	USA	Connor Jones
00	GK	USA	Tyler Willen
1	GK	USA	Colin Shutler
2	DF	ESP	Sergi Nus
3	DF	USA	Max Diamond
4	DF	NGA	Prosper Figbe
5	DF	USA	Henry Kessler
6	DF	USA	Aboubacar Keita
7	FW	USA	Simeon Okoro
8	MF	NZL	Joe Bell
9	FW	USA	Kennedy Nwabia
10	MF	USA	Justin Ingram
11	FW	TAN	Irakoze Donasiyano
12	DF	USA	Spencer Patton
13	FW	USA	Daryl Dike

No.	Pos.	Nation	Player
15	MF	DEN	Daniel Barir
16	FW	USA	Jerren Nixon
17	FW	USA	Ahdan Tait
18	GK	USA	Marcel DaSilva
19	FW	ENG	Nathaniel Crofts
20	FW	ZIM	Cabrel Happi Kamseu
21	MF	USA	Aaron James
22	FW	SCO	Daniel Steedman
25	MF	USA	Bret Halsey
26	MF	USA	Ben Grant
27	MF	USA	Beau Bradley
28	FW	MEX	Enrique Banuelos
30	DF	GER	Robin Afamefuna
35	MF	USA	Brad Kurtz

== Schedule ==
Date Time, TV	Rank^{#}	Opponent^{#}	Result	Record	Site (Attendance) City, State
U.S. Soccer Spring Men's College Program
March 17*; 1:00 p.m.		Georgetown	L 1–4	0–1–0	Klöckner Stadium; Charlottesville, VA
March 24; 1:00 p.m.		at Duke	W 0–2	1–1–0	751 Field; Durham, NC
April 7; 2:00 p.m.		at North Carolina	L 2–1	1–2–0	Finley Athletic Complex; Chapel Hill, NC
April 14; 1:00 p.m.		Clemson			Klöckner Stadium; Charlottesville, VA
April 21; 2:00 p.m.		at Wake Forest			Spry Stadium; Winston-Salem, NC
Exhibition
August 14*; 7:00 pm	No. 15	No. RV VCU	T 0–0	– (–)	Klöckner Stadium; Charlottesville, VA
August 18*; 7:00 pm	No. 15	No. 13 Georgetown	T 1–1		Klöckner Stadium; Charlottesville, VA
Regular Season
August 24*; 7:00 pm	No. 15	No. 19 New Hampshire	W 1–0	1–0–0 (0–0–0)	Klöckner Stadium (1,821); Charlottesville, VA
August 30*; 7:00 pm	No. 7	Elon	Canceled		Klöckner Stadium; Charlottesville, VA
September 3*; 7:00 pm	No. 7	vs. Maryland; Rivalry	T 0–0 ^{2OT}	1–0–1 (0–0–0)	Audi Field (3,527); Washington, DC
September 7; 7:00 pm	No. 10	No. 21 Virginia Tech; Rivalry	T 1–1 ^{2OT}	1–0–2 (0–0–1)	Klöckner Stadium (2,892); Charlottesville, VA
September 11*; 7:00 pm	No. 19	Marshall	W 1–0	2–0–2 (0–0–1)	Klöckner Stadium (1,069); Charlottesville, VA
September 18*; 7:00 pm	No. 22	FIU	W 2–0	3–0–2 (0–0–1)	Klöckner Stadium (1,337); Charlottesville, VA
September 21; 7:00 pm	No. 22	at Syracuse	W 0–2	4–0–2 (1–0–1)	SU Soccer Stadium (1,080); Syracuse, NY
September 28; 7:00 pm	No. 11	at Pittsburgh	W 0–2	5–0–2 (2–0–1)	Ambrose Urbanic Field (710); Pittsburgh, PA
October 2*; 7:00 pm	No. 10	Wright State	W 2–1	6–0–2 (2–0–1)	Klöckner Stadium (1,178); Charlottesville, VA
October 5; 7:00 pm	No. 10	No. 23 Duke	L 0–2	6–1–2 (2–1–1)	Klöckner Stadium (2,129); Charlottesville, VA
October 8*; 7:00 pm	No. 10	No. 5 Denver	W 3–0	7–1–2 (2–1–1)	Klöckner Stadium (1,430); Charlottesville, VA
October 12; 7:00 pm	No. 14	at Clemson	W 1–4	8–1–2 (3–1–1)	Riggs Field (1,463); Clemson, SC
October 16*; 7:00 pm	No. 6	Radford	W 2–1	9–1–2 (3–1–1)	Klöckner Stadium (1,254); Charlottesville, VA
October 20; 7:00 pm	No. 6	No. 1 Wake Forest	L 2–3	9–2–2 (3–2–1)	Klöckner Stadium (2,791); Charlottesville, VA
October 23; 7:00 pm	No. 6	No. 23 Notre Dame	T 0–0 ^{2OT}	9–2–3 (3–2–2)	Klöckner Stadium (2,356); Charlottesville, VA
October 26; 7:00 pm	No. 6	at No. 5 North Carolina	Canceled		WakeMed Soccer Park; Cary, NC
ACC Tournament
October 31; 7:00 pm	(6) No. 7	(11) Pittsburgh; First Round	L 0–2	9–3–3 (3–3–2)	Klöckner Stadium (510); Charlottesville, VA
NCAA Tournament
November 18*; 1:00 pm	(10) No. 11	Furman; Second Round	W 2–0	10–3–3	Klöckner Stadium (898); Charlottesville, VA
November 25*; 5:00 pm	(10) No. 11	(7) No. 13 Notre Dame; Third Round	L 1–0 ^{OT}	10–4–3	Alumni Stadium (376); South Bend, IN
*Non-conference game. ^{#}Rankings from United Soccer Coaches. (#) Tournament seedings in parentheses.

== Statistics ==
=== Disciplinary record ===
Rank	No.	Nat.	Po.	Name	Regular Season			ACC Tournament			NCAA Tournament			Total		
Rank	No.	Nat.	Po.	Name	Booked	(yellow card) (yellow-red card)	Sent off (straight red)	Booked	(yellow card) (yellow-red card)	Sent off (straight red)	Booked	(yellow card) (yellow-red card)	Sent off (straight red)	Booked	(yellow card) (yellow-red card)	Sent off (straight red)
1	10	(United States)	MF	Justin Ingram	1	0	0	0	0	0	0	0	0	0	0	0
Total					1	0	0	0	0	0	0	0	0	0	0	0

== Awards and honors ==
Recipient	Award	Date	Ref.
Colin Shutler	ACC Defensive Player of the Week	August 28, 2018	
Colin Shutler	ACC Defensive Player of the Week	September 17, 2018	
Daryl Dike	ACC Offensive Player of the Week	October 15, 2018	
Joe Bell	All-ACC Third Team	November 7, 2018	
Henry Kessler	All-ACC Third Team	November 7, 2018	
Daryl Dike	All-ACC Freshman Team	November 7, 2018	
Cabrel Happi Kamseu	All-ACC Freshman Team	November 7, 2018	
Aboubacar Keita	All-ACC Freshman Team	November 7, 2018	
Daniel Steedman	All-ACC Freshman Team	November 7, 2018	

== 2019 MLS Super Draft ==
Virginia did not have any players selected in the 2019 MLS SuperDraft.

== Rankings ==
Ranking movement Legend: ██ Improvement in ranking. ██ Decrease in ranking. ██ Not ranked the previous week. RV=Others receiving votes.
Poll	Pre	Wk 1	Wk 2	Wk 3	Wk 4	Wk 5	Wk 6	Wk 7	Wk 8	Wk 9	Wk 10	Wk 11	Wk 12	Wk 13	Wk 14	Wk 15	Wk 16	Final
United Soccer	15	7	10	19	22	11	10	14	6	6	7	11	11	None Released				15
TopDrawer Soccer	16	16	13	8	14	12	6	6	11	6	5	4	11	7	6	11	11	11
