= 2018 Virginia Tech Hokies men's soccer team =

American college soccer season

2018 Virginia Tech Hokies men's soccer

NCAA Tournament, Third Round
- Conference: Atlantic Coast Conference
- U. Soc. Coaches poll: No. 17
- TopDrawerSoccer.com: No. 14
- Record: 11–7–3 (3–4–1 ACC)
- Head coach: Mike Brizendine (10th season)
- Assistant coaches: Jeff Kinney (4th season); Patrick McSorley (9th season)
- Home stadium: Thompson Field

2018 ACC men's soccer standings
	Conf.					Overall
Team	W		L		T	W		L		T
Atlantic
No. 6 Wake Forest +	7	–	1	–	0	18	–	3	–	0
No. 16 Louisville ‡	4	–	2	–	2	11	–	5	–	3
NC State +	2	–	4	–	2	10	–	7	–	3
Boston College	2	–	5	–	1	4	–	8	–	4
Syracuse +	1	–	4	–	3	7	–	7	–	4
Clemson	2	–	6	–	0	7	–	9	–	1
Coastal
No. 14 North Carolina +	6	–	1	–	0	14	–	4	–	1
No. 11 Duke +	5	–	3	–	0	11	–	7	–	2
No. 8 Notre Dame +	4	–	3	–	1	11	–	7	–	3
No. 15 Virginia +	3	–	2	–	2	10	–	4	–	3
No. 17 Virginia Tech +	3	–	4	–	1	11	–	7	–	3
Pittsburgh	2	–	6	–	0	8	–	10	–	1
‡ – 2018 ACC Tournament champion + – Invited to the 2018 NCAA Division I Men's Soccer Championship; As of December 11, 2018; Rankings from United Soccer Coaches; Source:The ACC

The 2018 Virginia Tech Hokies men's soccer team represented Virginia Tech during the 2018 NCAA Division I men's soccer season. It was the 47th season of the university fielding a program. The Hokies played their home games at Sandra D. Thompson Field in Blacksburg, Virginia. The Hokies were led by tenth year head coach Mike Brizendine.

== Background ==
The 2017 Virginia Tech men's soccer team finished the season with a 10–10–0 overall record and a 3–5–0 ACC record. The Hokies were seeded ninth–overall in the 2017 ACC Men's Soccer Tournament. The Hokies won their first round match up against NC State, but fell to eventual champions Wake Forest in the second round. The Hokies earned an at-large bid into the 2017 NCAA Division I Men's Soccer Tournament. Virginia Tech defeated Air Force in the first round, before losing to Michigan State in the second round.

At the end of the season, one Hokie men's soccer player was selected in the 2018 MLS SuperDraft: Ben Lungaard.

== Player movement ==
=== Players leaving ===
Name	Number	Pos.	Height	Weight	Year	Hometown	Reason for departure
Morten Lamps	0	GK	6'2"	185	Senior	Flensburg, GER	Graduated
Ben Lungaard	1	GK	6'5"	200	Senior	Greenville, DE	Declared for the 2018 MLS SuperDraft; selected 21st overall by Columbus Crew SC
Collin Verfurth	3	MF/DF	6'4"	185	Senior	Ashburn, VA	Graduated
Elias Tamburini	9	DF	5'10"	170	Senior	Helsinki, FIN	Graduated
Marcelo Acuna	11	FW	6'2"	180	Senior	San José, CRC	Graduated
Matt Dudon	19	DF	5'11"	175	Senior	Dayton, OH	Graduated
Rodrigo Zampieri	20	DF	6'0"	170	Senior	São Sebastião do Paraíso, BRA	Graduated
Gino Rossi	22	FW	6'0"	170	Senior	Schenectady, NY	Graduated
Forrest White	23	MF	6'0"	165	Senior	Crozet, VA	Graduated

=== Players arriving ===
The Hokies announced the signing of nine players on February 8, 2018. The Hokies announced two more signings on March 17, 2018.

Name	Nat.	Hometown	Club	TDS Rating
David Alm; DF	SWE	Boo, SWE	Hammarby IF	N/A
Nicholas Blacklock; FW	USA	Wade, PA	Philadelphia Union	2/5 stars
Kahlil Dover; FW	USA	Reston, VA	Braddock Road YC	2/5 stars
Nathan Durst; DF	USA	Ashburn, VA	Loudoun Soccer Club	2/5 stars
Sivert Haugli; DF	NOR	Oslo, NOR	Baerum SK	N/A
Vincent Jackson; FW	USA	Southfield, MI	Michigan Wolves Crew Soccer Club	3/5 stars
Connor Jordan-Hyde; GK	USA	Kansas City, KS	Sporting Kansas City Academy	N/A
Daniel Seungmin Kang; FW	USA	Fairfax, VA	Braddock Road YC Academy	2/5 stars
Christopher Little; MF	USA	Ashburn, VA	Loudoun Soccer Club	3/5 stars
Evans Moyo; MF	USA	Round Hill, VA	Loudoun Soccer Club	N/A
Esteban Gonzales Rivera; DF	CRC	San José, CRC	Universidad Hispanoamericana	N/A
Mathjis Swaneveld; GK	NED	Schoonhoven, NED	CVV de Jodan Boys	N/A

== Squad ==
=== Roster ===
Updated: August 23, 2018

Note: Flags indicate national team as defined under FIFA eligibility rules; some limited exceptions apply. Players may hold more than one non-FIFA nationality.

No.	Pos.	Nation	Player
0	GK	(United States) USA	Connor Jordan-Hyde
1	GK	(Netherlands) NED	Mathijs Swaneveld
2	DF	(United States) USA	Will Mejia
3	DF	(Norway) NOR	Sivert Haugli
4	DF	(Sweden) SWE	David Alm
5	DF	(Iceland) ISL	Jon Ingason
6	FW	(United States) USA	Brendan Moyers
7	FW	(United States) USA	Nico Quashie
8	FW	(United States) USA	James Kasak
9	MF	(United States) USA	David Sanz
10	MF	(United States) USA	Chris Little
11	FW	(United States) USA	Arion Sobers-Assue
12	MF	(Finland) FIN	Emil Koho
13	DF	(Canada) CAN	Nikal Clarke-Smith
14	FW	(United States) USA	Kahlil Dover

No.	Pos.	Nation	Player
15	MF	(United States) USA	Kristo Strickler
16	MF	(United States) USA	Rory Slevin
17	DF	(Switzerland) SUI	Marc Hoppler
18	MF	(South Korea) KOR	Daniel Kang
19	DF	(United States) USA	Nathan Durst
20	MF	(Costa Rica) CRC	Esteban Gonzalez
21	MF	(United States) USA	Camron Lennon
22	FW	(United States) USA	Vincent Jackson II
23	FW	(United States) USA	Evans Moyo
24	MF	(Finland) FIN	Justus Kauppinen
25	GK	(United States) USA	Charles Filby
27	GK	(United States) USA	Hayden Kickbush
28	FW	(Costa Rica) CRC	Sebastian Rodriguez
30	FW	(France) FRA	Gaetan Roux
31	FW	(Germany) GER	Jakob Bluemler

== Team management ==
Position	Staff
Athletic director	Whit Babcock
Head coach	Mike Brizendine
Assistant coach	Jeff Kinney
Assistant coach	Patrick McSorley
Volunteer Assistant Coach	Kyle Renfro

== Schedule ==
Date Time, TV	Rank^{#}	Opponent^{#}	Result	Record	Site (Attendance) City, State
Exhibition
August 11*; 4:00 pm		West Virginia	W 4–1	– (–)	Thompson Field; Blacksburg, VA
August 14*; 7:00 pm		at Old Dominion	W 3–2	– (–)	Old Dominion Soccer Complex; Norfolk, VA
August 18*; 7:00 pm		Villanova	W 1–0	– (–)	Thompson Field; Blacksburg, VA
Regular season
August 24*; 4:00 pm		vs. Air Force; JMU Invitational	W 2–1	1–0–0 (0–0–0)	Sentara Park; Harrisonburgh, VA
August 26*; 4:00 pm		vs. Gardner–Webb; JMU Invitational	W 2–1 ^{2OT}	2–0–0 (0–0–0)	Sentara Park; Harrisonburgh, VA
August 31*; 7:00 pm	No. RV	at South Florida	W 1–0	3–0–0 (0–0–0)	Corbett Soccer Stadium (903); Tampa, FL
September 2*; 7:00 pm	No. RV	at UCF	T 2–2 ^{2OT}	3–0–1 (0–0–0)	UCF Soccer and Track Stadium (249); Orlando, FL
September 7; 7:00 pm	No. 21	at No. 10 Virginia; Rivalry	T 1–1 ^{2OT}	3–0–2 (0–0–1)	Klöckner Stadium (2,892); Charlottesville, VA
September 11*; 7:00 pm	No. 16	at UNCG	W 2–0	4–0–2 (0–0–1)	UNCG Soccer Stadium (363); Greensboro, NC
September 14; 7:30 pm	No. 16	No. 1 Wake Forest	L 1–2	4–1–2 (0–1–1)	Thompson Field (1,200); Blacksburg, VA
September 18*; 7:00 pm	No. 14	Longwood	W 5–1	5–1–2 (0–1–1)	Thompson Field (217); Blacksburg, VA
September 21; 7:00 pm	No. 14	at No. 18 NC State	L 0–1	5–2–2 (0–2–1)	Dail Soccer Field (786); Raleigh, NC
September 28; 7:00 pm	No. 21	Syracuse	W 1–0 ^{2OT}	6–2–2 (1–2–1)	Thompson Field (927); Blacksburg, VA
October 2*; 7:00 pm	No. 19	South Carolina	L 1–2 ^{2OT}	6–3–2 (1–2–1)	Thompson Field (323); Blacksburg, VA
October 6; 7:00 pm	No. 19	at No. 3 North Carolina	L 1–2	6–4–2 (1–3–1)	Koskinen Stadium (2,074); Durham, NC
October 12; 7:00 pm		Pittsburgh	W 3–1	7–4–2 (2–3–1)	Thompson Field (834); Blacksburg, VA
October 16*; 7:00 pm		William & Mary	W 4–0	8–4–2 (2–3–1)	Thompson Field (324); Blacksburg, VA
October 19; 7:00 pm		at No. 16 Notre Dame	W 5–2	9–4–2 (3–3–1)	Alumni Stadium (514); South Bend, IN
October 23*; 7:00 pm	No. 18	at Davidson	T 2–2	9–4–3 (3–3–1)	Alumni Soccer Stadium (302); Davidson, NC
October 26; 7:00 pm	No. 18	No. 14 Duke	L 0–2	9–5–3 (3–4–1)	Thompson Field (274); Blacksburg, VA
ACC Tournament
October 31; 7:00 pm	(7) No. 22	(10) Syracuse; First Round	W 3–1	10–5–3	Thompson Field (294); Blacksburg, VA
November 4; 1:00 pm	(7) No. 22	(2) No. 4 North Carolina; Quarterfinals	L 0–3	10–6–3	WakeMed Soccer Park (507); Cary, NC
NCAA Tournament
November 18*; 3:00 pm	(12) No. 19	No. 14 Charlotte; Second Round	W 1–0	11–6–3	Thompson Field (446); Blacksburg, VA
November 25*; 4:00 pm	(12) No. 19	James Madison; Third Round	L 0–3	11–7–3	Thompson Field (740); Blacksburg, VA
*Non-conference game. ^{#}Rankings from United Soccer Coaches. (#) Tournament seedings in parentheses.

== Awards and honors ==
Recipient	Award	Date	Ref.
Kristo Strickler	ACC Offensive Player of the Week	October 22, 2018	
Kristo Strickler	All-ACC Second Team	November 7, 2018	
Mathijs Swaneveld	All-ACC Third Team	November 7, 2018	

== 2019 MLS Super Draft ==
Virginia Tech did not have any players selected in the 2019 MLS SuperDraft.

== Rankings ==
Ranking movement Legend: ██ Improvement in ranking. ██ Decrease in ranking. ██ Not ranked the previous week. RV=Others receiving votes.
Poll	Pre	Wk 1	Wk 2	Wk 3	Wk 4	Wk 5	Wk 6	Wk 7	Wk 8	Wk 9	Wk 10	Wk 11	Wk 12	Wk 13	Wk 14	Wk 15	Wk 16	Final
United Soccer		RV	21	16	14	21	19	RV	RV	18	22	24	19	None Released				17
TopDrawer Soccer			25	19	16	16	13	12	14	15	10	8	12	11	9	14	14	14

== See also ==
- Virginia Tech Hokies men's soccer
- 2018 Atlantic Coast Conference men's soccer season
- 2018 NCAA Division I men's soccer season
