= 2018 NC State Wolfpack men's soccer team =

American college soccer season

2018 NC State Wolfpack men's soccer

NCAA Tournament, Second Round
- Conference: Atlantic Coast Conference
- U. Soc. Coaches poll: No. RV
- TopDrawerSoccer.com: No. 24
- Record: 10–7–3 (2–4–2 ACC)
- Head coach: George Kiefer (2nd season)
- Assistant coaches: Jeff Negalha (2nd season); Kyle Nicholls (2nd season); Nathan Walzer (1st season)
- Home stadium: Dail Soccer Field

2018 ACC men's soccer standings
	Conf.					Overall
Team	W		L		T	W		L		T
Atlantic
No. 6 Wake Forest +	7	–	1	–	0	18	–	3	–	0
No. 16 Louisville ‡	4	–	2	–	2	11	–	5	–	3
NC State +	2	–	4	–	2	10	–	7	–	3
Boston College	2	–	5	–	1	4	–	8	–	4
Syracuse +	1	–	4	–	3	7	–	7	–	4
Clemson	2	–	6	–	0	7	–	9	–	1
Coastal
No. 14 North Carolina +	6	–	1	–	0	14	–	4	–	1
No. 11 Duke +	5	–	3	–	0	11	–	7	–	2
No. 8 Notre Dame +	4	–	3	–	1	11	–	7	–	3
No. 15 Virginia +	3	–	2	–	2	10	–	4	–	3
No. 17 Virginia Tech +	3	–	4	–	1	11	–	7	–	3
Pittsburgh	2	–	6	–	0	8	–	10	–	1
‡ – 2018 ACC Tournament champion + – Invited to the 2018 NCAA Division I Men's Soccer Championship; As of December 11, 2018; Rankings from United Soccer Coaches; Source:The ACC

The 2018 NC State Wolfpack men's soccer team represented North Carolina State University during the 2018 NCAA Division I men's soccer season. The Wolfpack were led by head coach George Kiefer, in his second season. They played home games at Dail Soccer Field. NC State finished the season with a 10–7–3 (2–4–2) record and earned a berth into the NCAA Tournament, where they lost to Maryland in the second round.

== Background ==
The 2017 NC State men's soccer team finished the season with an 8–6–4 overall record and a 3–3–2 ACC record. The Wolfpack were seeded eight–overall in the 2017 ACC Men's Soccer Tournament, where they lost to Virginia Tech in the first round. The Wolfpack earned an at-large bid into the 2017 NCAA Division I Men's Soccer Tournament. In the tournament, the Wolfpack lost to Old Dominion in the first round.

At the end of the season, one Wolfpack men's soccer player was selected in the 2018 MLS SuperDraft: Caleb Duvernay.

== Player movement ==
=== Players Leaving ===
Name	Number	Pos.	Height	Weight	Year	Hometown	Reason for departure
Caleb Duvernay	3	DF	5'7"	162	Senior	Cary, NC	Declared for 2018 MLS SuperDraft; selected 61st overall by Portland Timbers
Maximilian Luftl	15	MF	6'0"	174	Senior	Fürstenstein, GER	Graduated
Julius Duchscherer	16	MF	5'6"	145	Senior	Hadamar, GER	Graduated
Jake Dykes	19	DF	6'0"	173	Senior	Sligo, IRE	Graduated
Roland Minogue	20	MF	5'7"	156	Senior	Huntersville, NC	Graduated
Jan–Luca Ahillen	21	MF	6'1"	185	Senior	Meppen, GER	Graduated
Anthony Ruggiero	22	MF	6'1"	192	Freshman	Holtsville, NY	Transferred
Willy Ramirez	23	FW	5'7"	158	Junior	Garner, NC	Transferred

=== Players Arriving ===
Name	Nat.	Hometown	Club	TDS Rating
Alex Bautista; DF	USA	Mount Juliet, TN	FC Dallas	2/5 stars
Iverson Brisma; MF	USA	East Windsor, NJ	Philadelphia Union	2/5 stars
Aidan Foster; MF	USA	Cary, NC	North Carolina FC Youth	3/5 stars
Caleb Martinez	USA	Zephyrhills, FL	N/A	2/5 stars
Bailey O'Connor; MF	USA	Raleigh, NC	North Carolina FC Youth	3/5 stars
James Orozco; DF	USA	Durham, NC	North Carolina FC Youth	3/5 stars
Orlin Roque; MF	USA	Durham, NC	North Carolina FC Youth	3/5 stars
AJ Allen Seals; MF	USA	Orlando, FL	Orlando City SC	3/5 stars

== Squad ==
=== Roster ===
Updated August 3, 2018

Note: Flags indicate national team as defined under FIFA eligibility rules; some limited exceptions apply. Players may hold more than one non-FIFA nationality.

No.	Pos.	Nation	Player
0	GK	USA	Nick Cournoyer
1	GK	GER	Leon Krapf
2	FW	USA	Manny Perez
3	DF	ESP	Jose Garcia Valles
4	DF	USA	David Norris
5	FW	USA	Stephen Elias
6	DF	SUI	Christoph Schneuwly
7	FW	USA	Tanner Roberts
8	MF	USA	Brad Sweeney
9	FW	BEN	Ade Taiwo
10	FW	USA	David Loera
11	FW	USA	Tyler Gabarra
12	GK	USA	Vincent Durand
13	DF	GER	Simon Blotko
14	FW	USA	Clay Sparks
15	MF	BRA	Gabriel Machado

No.	Pos.	Nation	Player
16	MF	USA	AJ Seals
17	MF	USA	Nick Retzlaff
18	FW	USA	Iverson Brisma
19	DF	USA	Alex Bautista
20	FW	ENG	Kuda Muskwe
21	FW	USA	Orlin Roque
22	MF	USA	Aidan Foster
23	FW	USA	James Orozco
24		USA	Cyrus Rad
25	MF	USA	Jose Morales Jr.
26	MF	USA	Caleb Martinez
27		USA	Arnaud Deniel
28	MF	USA	Bailey O'Connor
29	DF	USA	Harry Adanuty
30	DF	USA	Matt Lockwood

=== Team management ===
Position	Staff
Athletic director	Debbie Yow
Head coach	George Kiefer
Associate Head Coach	Jeff Negalha
Assistant coach	Kyle Nicholls
Assistant coach	Nahtan Walzer
Director of Soccer	Lindsey Krakower
Director of Analytics	Paul Forster
Assistant Strength and Conditioning Coach/Director of Sport Science	Craig Turner
Senior Associate AD/Sports Administration & Student Services	Raymond Harrison
Assistant Athletic Trainer	Blake Wickerham
Academics	Maria Crockett

== Schedule ==
Date Time, TV	Rank^{#}	Opponent^{#}	Result	Record	Site (Attendance) City, State
Exhibition
August 18, 2018*; 7:00 pm		at Duke	L 0–1	– (–)	Koskinen Stadium; Durham, NC
Regular season
August 24, 2018*; 7:00 pm		USC Upstate	W 3–1	1–0–0 (0–0–0)	Dail Soccer Field (1,938); Raleigh, NC
August 27, 2018*; 7:00 pm		at No. 4 Akron	W 2–0	2–0–0 (0–0–0)	FirstEnergy Stadium (1,474); Akron, OH
August 31, 2018*; 7:00 pm	No. RV	Presbyterian	W 2–0	3–0–0 (0–0–0)	Dail Soccer Field (1,622); Raleigh, NC
September 3, 2018*; 7:00 pm	No. RV	William & Mary	W 2–1 ^{2OT}	4–0–0 (0–0–0)	Dail Soccer Field (854); Raleigh, NC
September 7, 2018; 7:00 pm	No. 8	at No. 1 Wake Forest	L 0–3	4–1–0 (0–1–0)	Spry Stadium (4,023); Winston–Salem, NC
September 11, 2018*; 12:30 pm	No. 18	Quinnipiac	W 1–0	5–1–0 (1–0–0)	Dail Soccer Field (197); Raleigh, NC
September 18, 2018*; 7:00 pm	No. 18	Stetson	Postponed	5–1–0 (1–0–0)	Dail Soccer Field; Raleigh, NC
September 21, 2018; 5:00 pm	No. 18	No. 14 Virginia Tech	W 1–0	6–1–0 (2–0–0)	Dail Soccer Field (786); Raleigh, NC
September 25, 2018; 7:00 pm	No. 12	at Pittsburgh	L 1–3	6–2–0 (1–2–0)	Ambrose Urbanic Field (254); Pittsburgh, PA
September 28, 2018; 7:00 pm	No. 12	No. 6 Louisville	T 2–2 ^{2OT}	6–2–1 (1–2–1)	Dail Soccer Field (1,255); Raleigh, NC
October 2, 2018*; 7:00 pm	No. 17	James Madison	T 0–0 ^{2OT}	6–2–2 (1–2–1)	Dail Soccer Field (810); Raleigh, NC
October 5, 2018; 7:00 pm	No. 17	at Boston College	L 0–1	6–3–2 (1–3–1)	Newton Soccer Complex (281); Chestnut Hill, MA
October 9, 2018*; 7:00 pm		at Longwood	W 2–0	7–3–2 (1–3–1)	Longwood Athletics Complex (187); Farmville, VA
October 12, 2018; 7:00 pm		No. 1 North Carolina; Rivalry	W 1–0	8–3–2 (2–3–1)	Dail Soccer Field (3,229); Raleigh, NC
October 16, 2018*; 7:00 pm	No. 21	at No. 11 UNC Wilmington	L 0–3	8–4–2 (2–3–1)	UNC Wilmington Soccer Stadium (2,028); Wilmington, NC
October 20, 2016; 7:00 pm	No. 21	No. 24 Syracuse	T 1–1 ^{2OT}	8–4–3 (2–3–2)	Dail Soccer Field (758); Raleigh, NC
October 27, 2018; 7:00 pm		at Clemson	L 0–3 ^{1,657}	8–5–3 (2–4–2)	Riggs Field; Clemson, SC
ACC tournament
October 31, 2018; 7:00 pm	(8)	(9) Boston College; First Round	W 3–1	9–5–3 (2–4–2)	Dail Soccer Field (437); Raleigh, NC
November 4, 2018; 1:00 pm	(8)	(1) No. 1 Wake Forest; Quarterfinals	L 0–2	9–6–3 (2–4–2)	Spry Stadium (2,037); Winston–Salem, NC
NCAA tournament
November 15*; 7:00 pm		Campbell; NCAA First Round	W 4–1	10–6–3	Dail Soccer Field (515); Raleigh, NC
November 18*; 1:00 pm		at (11) No. 15 Maryland; NCAA Second Round	L 0–2	10–7–3	Ludwig Field (1,266); College Park, MD
*Non-conference game. ^{#}Rankings from United Soccer Coaches. (#) Tournament seedings in parentheses.

== Awards and honors ==
Recipient	Award	Date	Ref.
Gabriel Machado	ACC Offensive Player of the Week	September 3, 2018	
Leon Krapf	ACC Defensive Player of the Week	September 24, 2018	
David Loera	ACC Offensive Player of the Week	October 15, 2018	
Leon Krapf	ACC Defensive Player of the Week	October 15, 2018	
Leon Krapf	United Soccer Coaches Player of the Week	October 16, 2018	
David Loera	All-ACC First Team	November 7, 2018	
Manny Perez	All-ACC Third Team	November 7, 2018	

== 2019 MLS SuperDraft ==
NC State did not have any players selected in the 2019 MLS SuperDraft.

== Rankings ==
Ranking movement Legend: ██ Improvement in ranking. ██ Decrease in ranking. ██ Not ranked the previous week. RV=Others receiving votes.
Poll	Pre	Wk 1	Wk 2	Wk 3	Wk 4	Wk 5	Wk 6	Wk 7	Wk 8	Wk 9	Wk 10	Wk 11	Wk 12	Wk 13	Wk 14	Wk 15	Wk 16	Final
United Soccer		RV	8	18	18	12	17	RV	21	RV				None Released				RV
TopDrawer Soccer	23	23	17	4	6	6	8	13	23	20	24	RV			24	24	24	24
