= 2018 Notre Dame Fighting Irish men's soccer team =

American college soccer season

2018 Notre Dame Fighting Irish men's soccer

NCAA Tournament, Quarterfinals
- Conference: Atlantic Coast Conference
- U. Soc. Coaches poll: No. 8
- TopDrawerSoccer.com: No. 7
- Record: 11–7–3 (4–3–1 ACC)
- Head coach: Chad Riley (1st season)
- Assistant coaches: Ryan Fahey (1st season); Brian Plotkin (1st season)
- Home stadium: Alumni Stadium

2018 ACC men's soccer standings
	Conf.					Overall
Team	W		L		T	W		L		T
Atlantic
No. 6 Wake Forest +	7	–	1	–	0	18	–	3	–	0
No. 16 Louisville ‡	4	–	2	–	2	11	–	5	–	3
NC State +	2	–	4	–	2	10	–	7	–	3
Boston College	2	–	5	–	1	4	–	8	–	4
Syracuse +	1	–	4	–	3	7	–	7	–	4
Clemson	2	–	6	–	0	7	–	9	–	1
Coastal
No. 14 North Carolina +	6	–	1	–	0	14	–	4	–	1
No. 11 Duke +	5	–	3	–	0	11	–	7	–	2
No. 8 Notre Dame +	4	–	3	–	1	11	–	7	–	3
No. 15 Virginia +	3	–	2	–	2	10	–	4	–	3
No. 17 Virginia Tech +	3	–	4	–	1	11	–	7	–	3
Pittsburgh	2	–	6	–	0	8	–	10	–	1
‡ – 2018 ACC Tournament champion + – Invited to the 2018 NCAA Division I Men's Soccer Championship; As of December 11, 2018; Rankings from United Soccer Coaches; Source:The ACC

The 2018 Notre Dame Fighting Irish men's soccer team represented University of Notre Dame during the 2018 NCAA Division I men's soccer season. It was the program's 41st season. It was the program's 6th season competing in the Atlantic Coast Conference. The Fighting Irish were led by head coach Chad Riley, in his first year.

== Background ==
The 2017 Notre Dame men's soccer team finished the season with an 11–7–2 overall record and a 3–3–2 ACC record. The Fighting Irish were seeded seventh–overall in the 2017 ACC Men's Soccer Tournament, where they lost to Virginia in the semifinals. The Fighting Irish earned an at-large bid into the 2017 NCAA Division I Men's Soccer Tournament for the fifth season in a row. As the twelfth–overall seed in the tournament, Notre Dame hosted Wisconsin. Notre Dame was upset 0–1 in overtime to end their season.

At the end of the season, one Fighting Irish men's soccer player was selected in the 2018 MLS SuperDraft: Jon Gallagher.

During the offseason, Bobby Clark retired as head coach and was replaced by Chad Riely.

== Player movement ==
=== Players leaving ===
Name	Number	Pos.	Height	Weight	Year	Hometown	Reason for departure
Chris Hubbard	1	GK	6'3"	207	Senior	Louisville, KY	Graduated
Matt Habrowski	4	DF	6'2"	189	Senior	Berkley, MI	Graduated
Jeffrey Farina	9	FW	6'3"	183	Senior	Wilmette, IL	Graduated
Jon Gallagher	10	FW	5'9"	158	Senior	Dublin, IRE	Declared for 2018 MLS SuperDraft; drafted 14th overall by Atlanta United
Kyle Dedrick	12	MF/FW	5'11"	156	Senior	Wilton, CT	Graduated

=== Players arriving ===
Name	Nat.	Hometown	Club	TDS Rating
Patrick Coleman; DF	USA	Antioch, IL	Chicago Magic PSG	2/5 stars
Benjamin Giacobello; MF	USA	San Clemente, CA	Strikers FC	2/5 stars
Samuel Guinane; GK	USA	Ladera Ranch, CA	West Coast FC	2/5 stars
Jack Lynn; FW	USA	St. Louis, MO	St. Louis Scott Gallagher	3/5 stars
Mohamed Omar; MF	CAN	Toronto, CAN	Toronto FC	3/5 stars
Philip Quinton; DF	USA	Portland, OR	FC Portland Academy	2/5 stars
Tyler Shea; MF	USA	Dallas, TX	Dallas Texans	3/5 stars
Bryan Silver; MF	USA	Herndon, VA	Loudoun Soccer Club	3/5 stars

== Squad ==
=== Roster ===
Updated August 23, 2018

Note: Flags indicate national team as defined under FIFA eligibility rules; some limited exceptions apply. Players may hold more than one non-FIFA nationality.

No.	Pos.	Nation	Player
1	GK	USA	Ryan Krutz
2	DF	USA	Philip Quinton
3	FW	USA	Spencer Farina
4	DF	USA	Brian Finn
5	MF	FRA	Félicien Dumas
6	MF	SCO	Sean Macleod
7	MF	USA	Jack Casey
8	MF	USA	Nick Cullen
9	FW	USA	John Rea
10	FW	IRL	Blake Townes
11	DF	USA	Sean Dedrick
12	MF	USA	Bryan Silver
13	GK	USA	Duncan Turnbull
14	FW	USA	Simon Roennecke
15	MF	USA	Aiden McFadden

No.	Pos.	Nation	Player
16	MF	USA	Tommy McCabe
17	DF	USA	Senan Farrelly
18	MF	USA	Townsend Meyer
19	GK	USA	Keagan McLaughlin
20	MF	USA	Patrick Coleman
21	FW	USA	Thomas Ueland
22	FW	USA	Ian Aschieris
23	DF	USA	Mitch MacDonald
24	FW	USA	Paul Rothrock
25	DF	USA	Patrick Berneski
26	MF	USA	Ben Giacobello
27	FW	USA	Jack Lynn
28	FW	USA	Tyler Shea
29	MF	CAN	Mohamed Omar
30	GK	USA	Sam Guianane

== Team management ==
Position	Staff
Athletic director	Jack Swarbrick
Head coach	Chad Riely
Assistant coach	Ryan Fahey
Assistant coach	Brian Plotkin

== Schedule ==
Date Time, TV	Rank^{#}	Opponent^{#}	Result	Record	Site City, State
Exhibition
August 20*; 5:00 pm	No. 17	Valparaiso	W 3–1	- (-)	Alumni Stadium; South Bend, IN
Regular Season
August 24*; 7:00 pm	No. 17	Saint Louis; Mike Berticelli Memorial Game	T 1–1	0–0–1 (0–0–0)	Alumni Stadium (1,079); South Bend, IN
August 31*; 5:00 pm	No. 24	vs. No. 18 Connecticut; Adidas/IU Credit Union Classic	W 3–0	1–0–1 (0–0–0)	Armstrong Stadium (N/A); Bloomington, IN
September 2*; 5:00 pm	No. 24	vs. No. 22 Dartmouth; Adidas/IU Credit Union Classic	W 2–0	2–0–1 (0–0–0)	Armstrong Stadium (N/A); Bloomington, IN
September 7; 7:00 pm	No. 12	at Syracuse	W 3–2	3–0–1 (1–0–0)	SU Soccer Stadium (1,908); Syracuse, NY
September 11*; 7:00 pm	No. 8	No. 2 Indiana	L 1–2 ^{OT}	3–1–1 (1–0–0)	Alumni Stadium (1,500); South Bend, IN
September 17*; 7:00 pm	No. 8	No. 4 Michigan State	L 0–1	3–2–1 (1–0–0)	Alumni Stadium (718); South Bend, IN
September 21; 7:00 pm	No. 8	No. 3 North Carolina	L 0–1 ^{2OT}	3–3–1 (1–1–0)	Alumni Stadium (1,724); South Bend, IN
September 25; 7:00 pm	No. 20	No. 22 Xavier	W 4–1	4–3–1 (2–0–0)	Alumni Stadium (736); South Bend, IN
September 28; 8:00 pm	No. 20	Boston College; Holy War	W 1–0	5–3–1 (2–1–0)	Alumni Stadium (1,456); South Bend, IN
October 2*; 7:30 pm	No. 15	at Northwestern	W 3–0	6–3–1 (2–1–0)	Martin Stadium (372); Evanston, IL
October 6; 7:00 pm	No. 15	No. 6 Louisville	W 2–1 ^{OT}	7–3–1 (3–1–0)	Alumni Stadium (646); South Bend, IN
October 12; 7:00 pm	No. 9	at No. 17 Duke	L 2–3	7–4–1 (3–2–0)	Koskinen Stadium (892); Durham, NC
October 16*; 6:00 pm	No. 16	at No. 18 Michigan	W 2–1	8–4–1 (3–2–0)	U–M Soccer Stadium (1,536); Ann Arbor, MI
October 19; 7:00 pm	No. 16	Virginia Tech	L 2–5	8–5–1 (3–3–0)	Alumni Stadium (514); South Bend, IN
October 23; 7:00 pm	No. 23	at No. 6 Virginia	T 0–0	8–5–2 (3–3–1)	Klöckner Stadium (2,356); Charlottesville, VA
October 26; 7:00 pm	No. 23	at Pittsburgh	W 1–0	9–5–2 (4–3–1)	Ambrose Urbanic Field (409); Pittsburgh, PA
ACC Tournament
October 31; 7:00 pm	(5) No. 18	(12) Clemson; First Round	W 2–0	10–5–2	Alumni Stadium (191); Notre Dame, IN
November 4; 1:00 pm	(5) No. 18	(4) No. 15 Louisville; Quarterfinals	L 0–1	10–6–2	Lynn Stadium (667); Louisville, KY
NCAA Tournament
November 18*; 5:00 pm	(7) No. 13	Michigan; Second Round	T 0–0 (11–10 PKs) ^{2OT}	10–6–3	Alumni Stadium (363); Notre Dame, IN
November 25*; 5:00 pm	(7) No. 13	(10) No. 11 Virginia; Third Round	W 1–0 ^{OT}	11–6–3	Alumni Stadium (376); Notre Dame, IN
November 30*; 7:00 pm	(7) No. 13	(2) No. 2 Indiana; Quarterfinals	L 0–1	11–7–3	Armstrong Stadium (5,159); Bloomington, IN
*Non-conference game. ^{#}Rankings from United Soccer Coaches. (#) Tournament seedings in parentheses.

== Awards and honors ==
Recipient	Award	Date	Ref.
Patrick Berneski	ACC Defensive Player of the Week	September 3, 2018	
Felicien Dumas	ACC Defensive Player of the Week	September 10, 2018	
Sean MacLeod	ACC Offensive Player of the Week	October 8, 2018	
Thomas Ueland	All-ACC Second Team	November 7, 2018	
Patrick Berneski	All-ACC Second Team	November 7, 2018	
Tommy McCabe	All-ACC Third Team	November 7, 2018	
Felicien Dumas	All-ACC Third Team	November 7, 2018	

== 2019 MLS Super Draft ==
Player	Team	Round	Pick #	Position
Tommy McCabe	FC Cincinnati	2	29	MF

== Rankings ==
Ranking movement Legend: ██ Improvement in ranking. ██ Decrease in ranking. ██ Not ranked the previous week. RV=Others receiving votes.
Poll	Pre	Wk 1	Wk 2	Wk 3	Wk 4	Wk 5	Wk 6	Wk 7	Wk 8	Wk 9	Wk 10	Wk 11	Wk 12	Wk 13	Wk 14	Wk 15	Wk 16	Final
United Soccer	17	24	12	8	8	20	15	9	16	23	18	16	13	None Released				8
TopDrawer Soccer	20	20	16	21	12	11	19	14	8	11	17	11	13	12	13	6	7	7
