= U.S. Soccer Spring Men's College Program =

Soccer tournament in the U.S.

- Organizer(s): USSF
- Founded: 2018; 8 years ago
- Region: United States
- Teams: 6
- Related competitions: NCAA Division I
- Current champion: North Carolina (2018)

U.S. Soccer Spring Men's College Program is a mini soccer season operated by the United States Soccer Federation that is open to NCAA Division I men's college soccer teams. The season runs from late February to mid-April. The purpose of the season is to provide a competitive environment for collegiate soccer players between the NCAA season in the fall and the USL League Two, National Premier Soccer League and United Premier Soccer Leagueseasons in the summer.

The first version of the program was held in 2018 with six institutions participating in a five-match season. The season saw the college teams use IFAB rules instead of NCAA rules for soccer.

== Rule differences ==
There were some notable rule difference between the U.S. Program and a normal NCAA program season:

- In NCAA soccer, matches use a countdown clock with stoppages in the clock if there is an extended stop of play. In the Spring College Program, an upward counting clock is employed, and the referee determines stoppage time.
- In NCAA soccer, there are unlimited substitutions and a match day roster up to 30 players. In the first half of a match, if a player is subbed off, they cannot return until the second half. In the second half, there are unlimited substitutions. In the Spring College Program, match day rosters cannot have more than 18 players, and there are a maximum of three substitutions the whole match. Players who are subbed off cannot return.
- In NCAA soccer, there can be up to three matches in a calendar week. In the Spring College Program, there is only one match per week.

== Champions ==
| Season | Winner | Runner-up | Third place |
|---|---|---|---|
| 2018 | North Carolina | Wake Forest | Virginia |

== See also ==
- College soccer
- USL League Two
- National Premier Soccer League
- United Premier Soccer League
