= 2018 Syracuse Orange men's soccer team =

American college soccer season

2018 Syracuse Orange men's soccer

NCAA Tournament, Second Round
- Conference: Atlantic Coast Conference
- U. Soc. Coaches poll: No. RV
- TopDrawerSoccer.com: No. 22
- Record: 7–7–4 (1–4–3 ACC)
- Head coach: Ian McIntyre (6th season)
- Assistant coaches: Jukka Masalin (6th season); Matt Verni (5th season)
- Home stadium: SU Soccer Stadium

2018 ACC men's soccer standings
	Conf.					Overall
Team	W		L		T	W		L		T
Atlantic
No. 6 Wake Forest +	7	–	1	–	0	18	–	3	–	0
No. 16 Louisville ‡	4	–	2	–	2	11	–	5	–	3
NC State +	2	–	4	–	2	10	–	7	–	3
Boston College	2	–	5	–	1	4	–	8	–	4
Syracuse +	1	–	4	–	3	7	–	7	–	4
Clemson	2	–	6	–	0	7	–	9	–	1
Coastal
No. 14 North Carolina +	6	–	1	–	0	14	–	4	–	1
No. 11 Duke +	5	–	3	–	0	11	–	7	–	2
No. 8 Notre Dame +	4	–	3	–	1	11	–	7	–	3
No. 15 Virginia +	3	–	2	–	2	10	–	4	–	3
No. 17 Virginia Tech +	3	–	4	–	1	11	–	7	–	3
Pittsburgh	2	–	6	–	0	8	–	10	–	1
‡ – 2018 ACC Tournament champion + – Invited to the 2018 NCAA Division I Men's Soccer Championship; As of December 11, 2018; Rankings from United Soccer Coaches; Source:The ACC

The 2018 Syracuse Orange men's soccer team represented Syracuse University during the 2018 NCAA Division I men's soccer season. It was the program's 95th season and 6th in the Atlantic Coast Conference. The Orange were led by Ian McIntyre, who was in his ninth year.

== Background ==
The 2017 Syracuse men's soccer team finished the season with a 6–8–4 overall record and a 0–6–2 ACC record. The Orange were seeded twelfth–overall in the 2017 ACC Men's Soccer Tournament, where they lost to Clemson in the first round. The Orange were not invited to the 2017 NCAA Division I Men's Soccer Tournament.

At the end of the 2017 season, one Orange men's soccer player was selected in the 2018 MLS SuperDraft: Mo Adams.

== Player movement ==
=== Players leaving ===
Name	Number	Pos.	Height	Weight	Year	Hometown	Reason for departure
Pat Castle	1	GK	6'1"	185	Senior	Schuylerville, NY	Graduated
Mo Adams	7	MF	5'6"	165	Sophomore	Nottingham, ENG	Declared for 2018 MLS SuperDraft; selected 10th overall by Chicago Fire.
Mamadou Balde	20	MF	6'1"	176	Senior	Corona, NY	Graduated

=== Players arriving ===
Name	Nat.	Hometown	Club	TDS Rating
Julio Fulcar; MF	USA	Watertown, MA	Boston Bolts	3/5 stars
Hilli Goldhar; MF	CAN	Toronto, CAN	Sigma FC	N/A
Samuel Gomez; GK	USA	St. Louis, MO	St. Louis Park FC	2/5 stars
Alphonso Joe; MF	USA	Rochester, NY	Empire United	3/5 stars
Michael Lantry; MF	USA	Syracuse, NY	Empire United	3/5 stars
Ryan Raposo; MF	CAN	Hamilton, CAN	Vaughn Soccer Club	2/5 stars
Nathaniel St. Louis; MF	CAN	Toronto, CAN	–	N/A

== Squad ==
=== Roster ===
Updated: August 3, 2018

Note: Flags indicate national team as defined under FIFA eligibility rules; some limited exceptions apply. Players may hold more than one non-FIFA nationality.

No.	Pos.	Nation	Player
1	GK	(United States) USA	Jake Leahy
2	MF	(Switzerland) SUI	Jan Breitenmoser
3	DF	(Norway) NOR	Sondre Norheim
4	MF	(United States) USA	Djimon Johnson
5	DF	(Canada) CAN	Kamal Miller
6	DF	(Germany) GER	Lennart Zeugner
7	FW	(Canada) CAN	Severin Soerlie
8	MF	(Sweden) SWE	Jonathan Hagman
9	FW	(Canada) CAN	Massimo Ferrin
10	FW	(France) FRA	Hugo Delhommelle
11	FW	(United States) USA	Adnan Bakalovic
12	DF	(United States) USA	John-Austin Ricks
13	DF	(United States) USA	Nikolas Steiner

No.	Pos.	Nation	Player
14	FW	(Norway) NOR	Petter Stangeland
15	MF	(Canada) CAN	Simon Triantafillou
16	MF	(United States) USA	Lukas Rubio
17	FW	(Canada) CAN	Tajon Buchanan
18	MF	(United States) USA	Julio Fulcar
19	DF	(United States) USA	Michael Lantry
20	MF	(Canada) CAN	Ben Goldhar
21	FW	(Canada) CAN	Nathaniel St. Louis
22	DF	(United States) USA	Dylan McDonald
23	MF	(Canada) CAN	Ryan Raposo
24	DF	(United States) USA	Alphonso Joe
25	GK	(Germany) GER	Hendrik Hilpert
30	GK	(United States) USA	Sam Gomez

=== Team management ===
Position	Staff
Athletic director	John Wildhack
Head coach	Ian McIntyre
Associate head coach	Jukka Masalin
Assistant coach	Matt Verni
Director of Operations	Todd Cook
Volunteer Assistant	Andrew Coughlin
Assistant Athletic Trainer	Mike Mangano

== Schedule ==
Date Time, TV	Rank^{#}	Opponent^{#}	Result	Record	Site (Attendance) City, State
Exhibition
August 12*; 7:00 pm		Canisius	W 3–1	– (–)	SU Soccer Stadium; Syracuse, NY
August 15*; 7:00 pm		Villanova	W 2–1	– (–)	SU Soccer Stadium; Syracuse, NY
August 18*; 7:00 pm		at Connecticut	T 0–0	– (–)	Morrone Stadium; Storrs, CT
Regular season
August 24*; 10:00 pm		at Oregon State	W 2–1	1–0–0 (0–0–0)	Paul Lorenz Field at Patrick Wayne Valley Stadium (401); Corvallis, OR
August 26*; 10:00 pm		at Portland	L 1–2	1–1–0 (0–0–0)	Merlo Field (1,952); Portland, OR
September 2*; 6:00 pm		Hofstra	W 4–3	2–1–0 (0–0–0)	SU Soccer Stadium (1,387); Syracuse, NY
September 7; 7:00 pm		No. 12 Notre Dame	L 2–3	2–2–0 (0–1–0)	SU Soccer Stadium (1,908); Syracuse, NY
September 10*; 7:00 pm, ESPN+		at Cornell	W 2–0	3–2–0 (0–1–0)	Charles F. Berman Field (211); Ithaca, NY
September 21; 7:00 pm		No. 22 Virginia	L 0–2	3–3–0 (0–2–0)	SU Soccer Stadium (1,080); Syracuse, NY
September 24*; 7:00 pm		Colgate	T 1–1 ^{2OT}	3–3–1 (0–2–0)	SU Soccer Stadium (1,021); Syracuse, NY
September 28; 7:00 pm		at No. 13 Virginia Tech	L 0–1 ^{2OT}	3–4–1 (0–3–0)	Thompson Field (927); Blacksburg, VA
October 1*; 7:00 pm		at Akron	W 3–1	4–4–1 (0–3–0)	FirstEnergy Stadium (1,598); Akron, OH
October 5; 7:00 pm		No. 1 Wake Forest	W 2–0	5–4–1 (1–3–0)	SU Soccer Stadium (1,957); Syracuse, NY
October 8*; 7:00 pm		Ohio State	W 3–0	6–4–1 (1–3–0)	SU Soccer Stadium (1,856); Syracuse, NY
October 12; 7:00 pm	No. 24	at No. 11 Louisville	T 2–2 ^{2OT}	6–4–2 (1–3–1)	Lynn Stadium (1,468); Louisville, KY
October 16*; 7:00 pm	No. 24	St. Bonaventure	W 7–0	7–4–2 (1–3–1)	SU Soccer Stadium (727); Syracuse, NY
October 20; 7:00 pm	No. 24	at No. 21 NC State	T 1–1 ^{2OT}	7–4–3 (1–3–2)	Dail Soccer Stadium (758); Raleigh, NC
October 23; 7:30 pm	No. 20	at Clemson	L 2–3	7–5–3 (1–4–2)	Riggs Field (1,600); Clemson, SC
October 26; 7:00 pm	No. 20	Boston College	T 0–0	7–5–4 (1–4–3)	SU Soccer Stadium (1,573); Syracuse, NY
ACC Tournament
October 31; 7:00 pm	(10)	at (7) No. 22 Virginia Tech; First Round	L 1–3	7–6–4	Thompson Field (294); Blacksburg, VA
NCAA Tournament
November 18*; 2:00 pm	(16)	No. 16 Akron; Second Round	L 1–3	7–7–4	SU Soccer Stadium (240); Syracuse, NY
*Non-conference game. ^{#}Rankings from United Soccer Coaches. (#) Tournament seedings in parentheses.

== Awards and honors ==
Recipient	Award	Date	Ref.
Hendrik Hilpert	ACC Defensive Player of the Week	October 8, 2018	
Hendrik Hilpert	United Soccer Coaches Player of the Week	October 9, 2018	
Kamal Miller	All-ACC Third Team	November 7, 2018	
Ryan Raposo	All-ACC Freshman Team	November 7, 2018	

== Rankings ==
Ranking movement Legend: ██ Improvement in ranking. ██ Decrease in ranking. ██ Not ranked the previous week. RV=Others receiving votes.
Poll	Pre	Wk 1	Wk 2	Wk 3	Wk 4	Wk 5	Wk 6	Wk 7	Wk 8	Wk 9	Wk 10	Wk 11	Wk 12	Wk 13	Wk 14	Wk 15	Wk 16	Final
United Soccer								24	24	20	RV	RV	RV	None Released				RV
TopDrawer Soccer						RV	23	RV	RV	23	23	RV	RV	20	22	22	22	22

== 2019 MLS Super Draft ==
Player	Team	Round	Pick #	Position
Tajon Buchanan	New England Revolution	1	9	FW
Kamal Miller	Orlando City	2	27	DF
