= 2018 Wake Forest Demon Deacons men's soccer team =

American college soccer season

2018 Wake Forest Demon Deacons men's soccer

ACC Regular Season Champions Carolina Nike Classic Champions

NCAA Tournament, Third Round
- Conference: Atlantic Coast Conference
- U. Soc. Coaches poll: No. 6
- TopDrawerSoccer.com: No. 9
- Record: 18–3–0 (7–1–0 ACC)
- Head coach: Bobby Muuss (4th season)
- Assistant coaches: Steve Armas (4th season); Dane Brenner (8th season)
- Home stadium: Spry Stadium

2018 ACC men's soccer standings
	Conf.					Overall
Team	W		L		T	W		L		T
Atlantic
No. 6 Wake Forest +	7	–	1	–	0	18	–	3	–	0
No. 16 Louisville ‡	4	–	2	–	2	11	–	5	–	3
NC State +	2	–	4	–	2	10	–	7	–	3
Boston College	2	–	5	–	1	4	–	8	–	4
Syracuse +	1	–	4	–	3	7	–	7	–	4
Clemson	2	–	6	–	0	7	–	9	–	1
Coastal
No. 14 North Carolina +	6	–	1	–	0	14	–	4	–	1
No. 11 Duke +	5	–	3	–	0	11	–	7	–	2
No. 8 Notre Dame +	4	–	3	–	1	11	–	7	–	3
No. 15 Virginia +	3	–	2	–	2	10	–	4	–	3
No. 17 Virginia Tech +	3	–	4	–	1	11	–	7	–	3
Pittsburgh	2	–	6	–	0	8	–	10	–	1
‡ – 2018 ACC Tournament champion + – Invited to the 2018 NCAA Division I Men's Soccer Championship; As of December 11, 2018; Rankings from United Soccer Coaches; Source:The ACC

The 2018 Wake Forest Demon Deacons men's soccer team represented Wake Forest University during the 2018 NCAA Division I men's soccer season. It was the 72nd season of the university fielding a program. It was the program's fourth season with Bobby Muuss as head coach. The Demon Deacons played their home matches at Spry Stadium.

== Background ==
The 2017 Wake Forest men's soccer team finished the season with a 19–2–2 overall record and a 7–0–1 ACC record. The Demon Deacons were seeded first–overall in the 2017 ACC Men's Soccer Tournament, and they went on to win the tournament. The Demon Deacons earned an automatic bid into the 2017 NCAA Division I Men's Soccer Tournament for winning the ACC Tournament. As the first–overall seed in the tournament, Wake Forest defeated Columbia and Butler, before losing to eventual champions Stanford in the Quarterfinals.

At the end of the season, three Demon Deacons men's soccer players were selected in the 2018 MLS SuperDraft: Jon Bakero, Ema Twumasi and Luis Argudo. Bakero and Twumasi were both taken in the first round.

== Player movement ==
=== Players leaving ===
Name	Number	Pos.	Height	Weight	Year	Hometown	Reason for departure
Luis Argudo	2	MF	5'8"	135	Senior	New York City, NY	Declared for 2018 MLS SuperDraft; selected 67th overall by Columbus Crew
Kevin Politz	4	DF	6'0"	170	Senior	Morganville, NJ	Graduated
Jon Bakero	7	FW	6'3"	165	Senior	Sitges, ESP	Declared for 2018 MLS SuperDraft; selected 5th overall by Chicago Fire
Steven Echevarria	15	MF	5'9"	145	Senior	Slate Hill, NY	Graduated
Ema Twumasi	22	MF	5'8"	160	Sophomore	Accra, GHA	Declared for 2018 MLS SuperDraft; selected 11th overall by FC Dallas

=== Players arriving ===
Name	Nat.	Hometown	Club	TDS Rating
Koby Carr; DF	USA	San Antonio, TX	Houston Dynamo Youth	4/5 stars
Kyle Holcomb; FW	USA	San Diego, CA	Pateadores SC	4/5 stars
Elijah Kerr; DF	USA	Stewart Manor, NY	Dix Hills SC	2/5 stars
Isaiah Parente; DF	USA	Medina, OH	Columbus Crew Academy	4/5 stars
John Rula; DF	USA	Birmingham, AL	FC Dallas	3/5 stars
Jake Swallen; MF	USA	Shoreview, MN	Minnesota Thunder	3/5 stars
Aristotle Zarris; MF	USA	Casa Grande, AZ	LA Galaxy	4/5 stars

== Squad ==
=== Roster ===
Updated:August 3, 2018

Note: Flags indicate national team as defined under FIFA eligibility rules; some limited exceptions apply. Players may hold more than one non-FIFA nationality.

No.	Pos.	Nation	Player
0	GK	USA	Andrew Pannenberg
1	GK	ESP	Andreu Cases Mundet
2	DF	USA	Koby Carr
3	FW	USA	Kyle Holcomb
4	DF	USA	Holland Rula
5	DF	TRI	Michael DeShields
6	DF	SWE	Alberto Catenacci
7	FW	USA	Aristotle Zarris
8	MF	CAN	Alistair Johnston
9	FW	USA	Tater Rennhack
10	MF	BRA	Bruno Lapa
11	MF	JAM	Justin McMaster
12	MF	USA	Brad Dunwell

No.	Pos.	Nation	Player
14	MF	JAM	Joey DeZart
15	MF	USA	Isaiah Parente
16	MF	USA	Omir Fernandez
17	DF	USA	Logan Gdula
19	DF	USA	Eddie Folds
20	MF	USA	Kyle McCurley
21	MF	USA	Machop Chol
24	MF	USA	Jake Swallen
25	DF	USA	Elijah Kerr
26	DF	USA	Sam Raben
28	DF	USA	Tyrrell Moore
29	DF	USA	Tre Bailey
30	GK	USA	Dominic Peters

=== Team management ===
Position	Staff
Athletic director	Ron Wellman
Head coach	Bobby Muuss
Assistant coach	Steve Armas
Assistant coach	Dane Brenner
Assistant coach	Matt Poplawski
Assistant Athletic Trainer	Michael White
Academic Counselor	Brooke Taylor
Strength & Conditioning Staff	David Bass

== Schedule ==
Date Time, TV	Rank^{#}	Opponent^{#}	Result	Record	Site (Attendance) City, State
Exhibition
August 12*; 7:00 pm	No. 5	at Furmam	T 4–4	– (–)	Stone Stadium (967); Greenville, SC
August 18*; 7:00 pm	No. 5	Loyola	W 2–0	– (–)	Spry Stadium; Winston–Salem, NC
Regular season
August 24*; 7:30 pm	No. 5	No. 2 Indiana; Carolina Nike Classic	W 2–1 ^{2OT}	1–0–0 (0–0–0)	Spry Stadium (4,751); Winston–Salem, NC
August 26*; 7:00 pm	No. 5	ETSU; Carolina Nike Classic	W 4–2	2–0–0 (0–0–0)	Spry Stadium (1,470); Winston–Salem, NC
September 1*; 7:00 pm	No. 1	at Florida Gulf Coast	W 3–1	3–0–0 (0–0–0)	FGCU Soccer Complex (1,017); Fort Myers, FL
September 4*; 7:00 pm	No. 1	Presbyterian	W 4–1	4–0–0 (0–0–0)	Spry Stadium (1,113); Winston–Salem, NC
September 7; 7:00 pm	No. 1	No. 8 NC State	W 3–0	5–0–0 (1–0–0)	Spry Stadium (4,023); Winston–Salem, NC
September 11*; 7:00 pm	No. 1	Georgia Southern	W 2–0	6–0–0 (1–0–0)	Spry Stadium (1,017); Winston–Salem, NC
September 14; 7:30 pm	No. 1	at No. 16 Virginia Tech	W 2–1	7–0–0 (2–0–0)	Thompson Field (1,200); Blacksburg, VA
September 21; 7:00 pm	No. 1	at Clemson	W 3–0	8–0–0 (3–0–0)	Riggs Field (3,259); Clemson, SC
September 25*; 7:00 pm	No. 1	Davidson	W 5–1	9–0–0 (3–0–0)	Spry Stadium (1,357); Winston–Salem, NC
September 29; 7:00 pm	No. 1	No. 15 Duke	W 4–2	10–0–0 (4–0–0)	Spry Stadium (4,937); Winston–Salem, NC
October 2*; 7:00 pm	No. 1	UNCG	W 2–0	11–0–0 (4–0–0)	Spry Stadium (1,819); Winston–Salem, NC
October 5; 7:00 pm	No. 1	at Syracuse	L 0–2	11–1–0 (4–1–0)	SU Soccer Stadium (1,957); Syracuse, NY
October 9*; 7:00 pm	No. 2	High Point	W 4–2	12–1–0 (4–1–0)	Spry Stadium (1,783); Winston–Salem, NC
October 12; 6:00 pm	No. 2	Boston College	W 2–1	13–1–0 (5–1–0)	Spry Stadium (3,111); Winston–Salem, NC
October 16*; 7:00 pm	No. 1	at South Carolina	W 2–0	14–1–0 (5–1–0)	Stone Stadium (2,250); Columbia, SC
October 20; 7:00 pm	No. 1	at No. 6 Virginia	W 3–2	15–1–0 (6–1–0)	Klöckner Stadium (2,791); Charlottesville, VA
October 26; 7:00 pm	No. 1	No. 17 Louisville	W 2–1 ^{OT}	16–1–0 (7–1–0)	Spry Stadium (1,165); Winston–Salem, NC
ACC Tournament
November 4; 1:00 pm	(1) No. 1	(8) NC State; Quarterfinal	W 2–0	17–1–0	Spry Stadium (2,037); Winston-Salem, NC
November 7; 7:00 pm	(1) No. 1	(4) No. 10 Louisville; Semifinal	L 1–2 ^{OT}	17–2–0	Spry Stadium (2,117); Winston-Salem, NC
NCAA Tournament
November 18*; 5:00 pm	(1) No. 2	Colgate; Second Round	W 2–0	18–2–0	Spry Stadium (1,802); Winston-Salem, NC
November 25*; 5:00 pm	(1) No. 2	Akron; Third Round	L 0–1	18–3–0	Spry Stadium (1,686); Winston-Salem, NC
*Non-conference game. ^{#}Rankings from United Soccer Coaches. (#) Tournament seedings in parentheses.

== Awards and honors ==
Recipient	Award	Date	Ref.
Bruno Lapa	ACC Offensive Player of the Week	August 28, 2018	
Omir Fernandez	ACC Offensive Player of the Week	September 10, 2018	
Omir Fernandez	ACC Offensive Player of the Week	September 17, 2018	
Bruno Lapa	United Soccer Coaches Player of the Week	October 2, 2018	
Logan Gdula	ACC Defensive Player of the Week	October 22, 2018	
Bobby Muuss	Atlantic Coast Conference Men's Soccer Coach of the Year	November 7, 2018	
Omir Fernandez	Atlantic Coast Conference Men's Offensive Player of the Year	November 7, 2018	
Bruno Lapa	Atlantic Coast Conference Men's Soccer Midfielder of the Year	November 7, 2018	
Omir Fernandez	All-ACC First Team	November 7, 2018	
Bruno Lapa	All-ACC First Team	November 7, 2018	
Brad Dunwell	All-ACC Second Team	November 7, 2018	
Sam Raben	All-ACC Third Team	November 7, 2018	
Aristotle Zarris	All-ACC Freshman Team	November 7, 2018	
Machop Chol	All-ACC Tournament Team	November 11, 2018	
Sam Raben	All-ACC Tournament Team	November 11, 2018	
Bruno Lapa	United Soccer Coaches First Team All-American	December 6, 2018	
Omir Fernandez	United Soccer Coaches First Team All-American	December 6, 2018	
Brad Dunwell	United Soccer Coaches Second Team All-American	December 6, 2018	

== 2019 MLS Super Draft ==
Player	Team	Round	Pick #	Position
Logan Gdula	FC Cincinnati	1	13	DF
Brad Dunwell	Houston Dynamo	3	56	MF

== Rankings ==
Ranking movement Legend: ██ Improvement in ranking. ██ Decrease in ranking. ██ Not ranked the previous week. RV=Others receiving votes.
Poll	Pre	Wk 1	Wk 2	Wk 3	Wk 4	Wk 5	Wk 6	Wk 7	Wk 8	Wk 9	Wk 10	Wk 11	Wk 12	Wk 13	Wk 14	Wk 15	Wk 16	Final
United Soccer	5	1	1	1	1	1	1	2	1	1	1	1	2	None Released				6
TopDrawer Soccer	3	3	1	1	1	1	1	1	2	1	1	1	1	3	2	9	9	9
