= Haji Abdikadir =

Somali footballer (born 1998)

Personal information
- Full name: Haji Abdikadir
- Date of birth: 15 October 1998 (age 28)
- Place of birth: Baidoa, Somalia
- Height: 1.80 m (5 ft 11 in)
- Position: Midfielder

Team information
- Current team: Athlone Town
- Number: 15

College career
Years	Team	Apps	(Gls)
2018–2021	Louisville Cardinals	43	(4)

Senior career*
Years	Team	Apps	(Gls)
2017	Derby City Rovers	8	(1)
2021	San Diego Loyal	6	(0)
2022	Colorado Springs Switchbacks	0	(0)
2023–	Athlone Town	20	(1)

International career^{‡}
2022–	Somalia	1	(0)
- * Club domestic league appearances and goals as of 1 July 2023 ‡ National team caps and goals as of 23 March 2022

Haji Abdikadir (born 15 October 1998) is a Somali professional footballer who plays as a midfielder for Athlone Town and the Somalia national team.

== Career ==
=== Youth ===
Abdikadir was born in Baidoa, Somalia, before his family came to the United States when he was eight years old. Abdikadir briefly lived in Florida for three months before settling in Louisville, Kentucky. Abdikadir went on play high school soccer at Louisville Collegiate School, where he was named 2016–2017 All-USA Player of the Year honors and also Gatorade Kentucky player of the year.

In 2017, Abdikadir played with USL PDL side Derby City Rovers, making eight appearances and scoring a single goal.

=== College ===
In 2018, Abdikadir attended the University of Louisville to play college soccer. During his three seasons with the Cardinals, including an extended 2020–21 season due to the COVID-19 pandemic, Abdikadir made 43 appearances, scoring four goals and tallying three assists.

=== Professional ===
On 24 July 2021, it was announced Abdikadir had signed for USL Championship side San Diego Loyal. He made his professional debut five days later, starting for San Diego in a 2–1 loss to Tacoma Defiance.

On 23 February 2022, Abdikadir's rights were traded to Colorado Springs Switchbacks in exchange for Thomas Amang. Two months later, both sides mutually agreed to terminate his deal with the club.

=== International ===
In March 2022, Abdikadir was called up to the Somalia national team. He debuted with Somalia in a 3–0 2023 Africa Cup of Nations qualification loss to Eswatini on 23 March 2022.
