= Giovanni Montesdeoca =

American soccer player

Personal information
- Full name: Giovanni Montesdeoca
- Date of birth: March 28, 1998 (age 28)
- Place of birth: Dallas, Texas, United States
- Height: 5 ft 9 in (1.75 m)
- Position: Forward

Youth career
- 2014–2016: FC Dallas

College career
Years	Team	Apps	(Gls)
2017–2020	North Carolina Tar Heels	37	(13)

Senior career*
Years	Team	Apps	(Gls)
2017–2018	Texas United	20	(4)
2018	NTX Rayados		
2019	Denton Diablos	5	(2)
2021	Loudoun United	19	(0)
2022	Union Omaha	3	(0)
- * Club domestic league appearances and goals as of October 16, 2022

Giovanni Montesdeoca (born March 28, 1998) is a professional American soccer player who plays as a forward.

== Career ==
=== Youth ===
Montesdeoca joined the FC Dallas academy in 2014, where he played until 2016. Giovanni while with FC Dallas Academy scored 27 goals in his first season with FC Dallas, and help to lead the team to two USSDA National Championship.

=== College ===
In 2016, Montesdeoca attended the University of North Carolina at Chapel Hill to play college soccer. He didn't appear for North Carolina in 2016, starting his freshman season the next year. He missed the 2019 season due to an ACL injury and only took part in a shortened season due to the COVID-19 pandemic. During his time with the Tar Heels, he made 37 appearances, scoring 13 goals and tallying 6 assists.

=== Amateur ===
Whilst at college, Montesdeoca appeared in the USL PDL for Texas United in 2017 and 2018, and in the NPSL for Denton Diablos in 2019. Montesdeoca played in the 2018 U.S. Open Cup with NTX Rayados, playing alongside his uncle José Burciaga Jr.

=== Professional ===
On January 21, 2021, Montesdeoca was selected 79th overall in the 2021 MLS SuperDraft by FC Dallas. However, he did not sign with the club. On July 2, 2021, Montesdeoca signed with USL Championship side Loudoun United. He debuted for the team two days later, starting in a 2–0 loss to Hartford Athletic.

Montesdeoca joined USL League One club Union Omaha on February 10, 2022.

== Personal ==
Montesdeoca is the nephew of former professional soccer player José Burciaga Jr., who played for Kansas City Wizards and Colorado Rapids in MLS.
