= Pablo Aguilar (footballer, born 1995) =

Guatemalan footballer

Personal information
- Full name: Pablo Andrés Aguilar Palacios
- Date of birth: February 21, 1995 (age 31)
- Place of birth: Guatemala City, Guatemala
- Height: 1.70 m (5 ft 7 in)
- Position: Attacking midfielder

Youth career
- 2009–2013: IMG Academy

College career
Years	Team	Apps	(Gls)
2013–2017	Virginia Cavaliers	75	(16)

Senior career*
Years	Team	Apps	(Gls)
2017	Reading United AC	1	(0)
2018	Rio Grande Valley FC	27	(2)
2019–2020	Antigua	46	(5)
2021	Comunicaciones	10	(0)
2021-2022	Antigua	20	(1)

International career^{‡}
2015	Guatemala U20	6	(0)
2018–2022	Guatemala	5	(0)
- * Club domestic league appearances and goals as of 14 April 2021 ‡ National team caps and goals as of 16:09, 29 July 2020 (UTC)

Pablo Andrés Aguilar Palacios (born 21 February 1995) is a Guatemalan former professional footballer who played as an attacking midfielder.

== Career ==
=== Youth and college ===
Aguilar played four years of college soccer at the University of Virginia between 2014 and 2017. He was named Second Team All-Atlantic Coast Conference in 2016, and USC Third Team All-South Region and Second Team All-Atlantic Coast Conference in 2017.

While at college, Aguilar played with USL PDL side Reading United AC in 2017.

=== Professional ===
On 21 January 2017, Aguilar was selected 59th overall in the 2018 MLS SuperDraft by Houston Dynamo. Aguilar joined Houston's United Soccer League affiliate side Rio Grande Valley FC Toros in March 2018. He made his professional debut on 16 March 2018, where he opened the scoring in a 1–1 draw with Saint Louis FC.

On 27 December 2018, it was confirmed, that Aguilar had signed with Antigua in the Liga Nacional de Fútbol de Guatemala.

=== Retirement ===
On 13 July 2022, Aguilar announced his retirement from professional football, citing to more focus on his family's business.

== International ==
He made his debut for Guatemala national football team on 15 November 2018 in a friendly against Israel which Guatemala lost 0–7.

== Honours ==
Antigua

- Liga Nacional de Guatemala: Clausura 2019

== Personal ==
Aguilar has dual citizenship with Guatemala and the United States.
