= 2017 ACC men's soccer tournament =

Soccer tournament

- Classification: Division I
- Teams: 12
- Matches: 11
- Attendance: 10,310 (937 per game)
- Site: MUSC Health Stadium (Final); Charleston, South Carolina (Final)
- Champions: Wake Forest (3rd title)
- Winning coach: Bobby Muuss (2nd title)
- MVP: (Spain) Andreu Cases Mundet (Wake Forest)
- Broadcast: ESPNU (Final), ACC Network Extra (all other rounds)

2017 ACC men's soccer standings
	Conf.					Overall
Team	W		L		T	W		L		T
Atlantic
No. 5 Wake Forest ‡	7	–	0	–	1	19	–	2	–	2
No. 7 Louisville +	5	–	2	–	1	13	–	2	–	5
No. 17 Clemson +	4	–	4	–	0	12	–	6	–	1
NC State +	3	–	3	–	2	8	–	6	–	4
Boston College	1	–	6	–	1	6	–	10	–	1
Syracuse	0	–	6	–	2	6	–	8	–	4
Coastal
No. 4 North Carolina +	6	–	1	–	1	17	–	4	–	1
No. 13 Duke +	4	–	3	–	1	13	–	4	–	3
No. 19 Virginia +	3	–	2	–	3	13	–	4	–	5
No. 18 Notre Dame +	3	–	3	–	2	11	–	7	–	2
Virginia Tech +	3	–	5	–	0	10	–	10	–	0
Pittsburgh	2	–	6	–	0	8	–	10	–	0
‡ – 2017 ACC Tournament champion + – Invited to the 2017 NCAA Division I Men's Soccer Championship; As of December 13, 2017; Rankings from United Soccer Coaches

The 2017 Atlantic Coast Conference men's soccer tournament was the 31st edition of the ACC Men's Soccer Tournament. The tournament decided the Atlantic Coast Conference champion and guaranteed representative into the 2017 NCAA Division I Men's Soccer Championship. The final was played at MUSC Health Stadium in Charleston, South Carolina.

== Qualification ==
All twelve teams in the Atlantic Coast Conference earned a berth into the ACC Tournament. The top 4 seeds receive first round byes and will host the winner of a first round game. All rounds, with the exception of the final are held at the higher seed's home field. Seeding is determined by regular season conference record. Ties are broken by overall winning percentage.

Seed	School	Conference	Points
1	Wake Forest	7–0–1	22
2	North Carolina	6–1–1	19
3	Louisville	5–2–1	16
4	Duke	4–3–1	14
5	Clemson	4–4–0	12
6	Virginia	3–2–3	12
7	Notre Dame	3–3–2	11
8	NC State	3–3–2	11
9	Virginia Tech	3–5–0	9
10	Pittsburgh	2–6–0	6
11	Boston College	1–6–1	4
12	Syracuse	0–6–2	2

== Bracket ==
*Note: Home team listed first. Rankings shown are ACC Tournament Seeds.

First Round
8	NC State	0
9	Virginia Tech	1
5	Clemson	2 (4)
12	Syracuse	2 (3)
6	Virginia	4
11	Boston College	0
7	Notre Dame	5
10	#Pittsburgh	0

Quarterfinals
1	Wake Forest	3
9	Virginia Tech	0
4	Duke	0
5	Clemson	1
3	#3 Louisville	0 (3)
6	Virginia	0 (4)
2	North Carolina	1
7	Notre Dame	2

Semifinals
1	Wake Forest	2
5	Clemson	1
6	#6 Virginia	2
7	Notre Dame	1

Finals
1	Wake Forest	0 (4)
6	Virginia	0 (3)

== Schedule ==
=== First round ===
November 1	#8 NC State	0–1 (a.e.t.)	#9 Virginia Tech	Raleigh, NC
7:00 p.m. EST	Manny Perez (yellow card) 47'	Report	Gaetan Roux 91'	Stadium: Dail Soccer Stadium; Attendance: 800; Referee: Mike Stutt

November 1	#5 Clemson	2–2 (a.e.t.) (4–3 p)	#12 Syracuse	Clemson, SC
7:00 p.m. EST	Justin Malou (yellow card) 50'; Saul Chinchilla 69'; Patrick Bunk-Andersen 85'	Report	Hugo Delhommelle (yellow card) 51'; Tajon Buchanan (yellow card) 51', (goal) 59'; Hendrick Hilpert (yellow card) 66'; Djimon Johnson (yellow card) 74'; Johannes Pieles (yellow card) 79', (goal) 88'; Mo Adams (yellow card) 101'	Stadium: Riggs Field; Attendance: 1,348; Referee: Charles Murphy
	Penalties
	Tanner Dieterich (penalty missed); Chris Heijjer (penalty scored); Oliver Shannon (penalty missed); Diego Campos (penalty scored); Micheal Melvin (penalty scored); Harrison Kurtz (penalty scored)		(penalty missed) Kamal Miller; (penalty scored) Hampus Bergdahl; (penalty missed) Hugo Delhommelle; (penalty scored) Lukas Rubio; (penalty scored) Hendrick Hilpert; (penalty missed) Johannes Pieles

November 1	#6 Virginia	4–0	#11 Boston College	Charlottesville, VA
7:00 p.m. EST	9' Own Goal; Pablo Aguilar 21', 30'; Edward Opoku 39'; Nate Odusote (yellow card) 64'	Report	Mohammed Moro (yellow card) 32'; Younes Boudadi (yellow card) 35'; Beto Luna (yellow card) 37'; Tomas Gudmundsson (yellow card) 45'; Lasse Lehmann (yellow card) 76'; Nikita Bondar (yellow card) 86'	Stadium: Klöckner Stadium; Attendance: 536; Referee: Sergio Gonzalez

November 1	#7 Notre Dame	5–0	#10 Pittsburgh	Notre Dame, IN
7:00 p.m. EST	Jon Gallagher 1'; Blake Townes 10'; Félicien Dumas 37'; Jeff Farina 48', 61'	Report	Tom Moxham (yellow card) 37'; Mauriq Hill (yellow card) 78'	Stadium: Alumni Stadium; Attendance: 128; Referee: Vito Testa

=== Quarterfinals ===
November 5	#1 Wake Forest	3–0	#9 Virginia Tech	Winston-Salem, NC
1:00 p.m. EST	Jon Bakero 2', 47'; Ema Twumasi 3', (yellow card) 26'	Report	Forrest White (yellow card) 40'; Rodrigo Zampieri (yellow card) 66'	Stadium: Spry Stadium; Attendance: 1,709; Referee: Carmen Serbio

November 5	#4 Duke	0–1	#5 Clemson	Durham, NC
1:00 p.m. EST	Markus Fjørtoft (yellow card) 57' (red card) 85'; Cody Brinkman (yellow card) 81'; Team (yellow card) 87'	Report	Diego Campos 57' (pen.); Andrew Burnikel (yellow card) 70'	Stadium: Koskinen Stadium; Attendance: 468; Referee: John McCloskey

November 5	#3 Louisville	0–0 (a.e.t.) (3–4 p)	#6 Virginia	Louisville, KY
1:00 p.m. EST		Report		Stadium: Lynn Stadium; Attendance: 738; Referee: Vito Testa
	Penalties
	Mohamed Thiaw (penalty scored); Walker Andriot (penalty missed); Tate Schmitt (penalty missed); Adrien Cabon (penalty scored); Tim Kübel (penalty scored)		(penalty scored) Sergi Nus; (penalty scored) Pablo Aguilar; (penalty missed) Jean-Christophe Koffi; (penalty scored) Joe Bell; (penalty scored) Nathaniel Crofts, Jr.

November 5	#2 North Carolina	1–2	#7 Notre Dame	Cary, NC
1:00 p.m. EST	Alan Winn 86'	Report	Blake Townes 5'; Jon Gallagher 77'	Stadium: WakeMed Soccer Park; Attendance: 395; Referee: John Brady

=== Semifinals ===
November 8	#1 Wake Forest	2–1	#5 Clemson	Winston-Salem, NC
7:00 p.m. EST	Omir Fernandez 32'; Jon Bakero 79'	Report	Oliver Shannon (yellow card) 59'; Saul Chinchilla 70'; Justin Malou (red card) 76'; Diego Campos (yellow card) 80'	Stadium: Spry Stadium; Attendance: 1,872; Referee: Sergio Gonzalez

November 8	#6 Virginia	2–1	#7 Notre Dame	Charlottesville, VA
7:00 p.m. EST	Robin Afamefuna 38'; Joe Bell 54'	Report	Jon Gallagher 49'	Stadium: Klöckner Stadium; Attendance: 1,142; Referee: Mike Stutt

=== Finals ===
November 12	#1 Wake Forest	0–0 (4–3 p)	#6 Virginia	Charleston, SC
12:00 p.m. EST	Logan Gdula (yellow card) 5' (red card) 43'; Luis Argudo (yellow card) 90'	Report	Prosper Figbe (yellow card) 41'; Sergi Nus (yellow card) 99'	Stadium: MUSC Health Stadium; Attendance: 1,174; Referee: Carmen Serbio
	Penalties
	Jon Bakero (penalty missed); Brandon Sevania (penalty missed); Bruno Lapa (penalty scored); Justin McMaster (penalty scored); Luis Argudo (penalty scored); Ema Twumasi (penalty scored)		(penalty scored) Sergi Nus; (penalty missed) Pablo Aguilar; (penalty scored) Robin Afamefuna; (penalty missed) Nate Odusote; (penalty scored) Nathaniel Cross Jr.; (penalty missed) Edward Opoku

== Statistics ==
=== Goalscorers ===
3 goals

- (Spain) Jon Bakero – Wake Forest
- (Republic of Ireland) Jon Gallagher – Notre Dame

2 goals

- (Guatemala) Pablo Aguilar – Virginia
- (Costa Rica) Saul Chinchilla – Clemson
- (United States) Jeff Farina – Notre Dame
- (United States) Blake Townes – Notre Dame

1 goal

- (Germany) Robin Afamefuna – Virginia
- (Denmark) Patrick Bunk-Andersen – Clemson
- (New Zealand) Joe Bell – Virginia
- (Costa Rica) Diego Campos – Clemson
- (France) Félicien Dumas – Notre Dame
- (United States) Omir Fernandez – Wake Forest
- (United States) Edward Opoku – Virginia
- (France) Gaetan Roux – Virginia Tech
- (Ghana) Ema Twumasi – Wake Forest
- (United States) Alan Winn – North Carolina

Own Goals

- Boston College (team) against Virginia

== All-Tournament team ==
**ACC Men’s Soccer All-Tournament team**

Diego Campos, Clemson
Justin Malou, Clemson
Jeff Farina, Notre Dame
Jon Gallagher, Notre Dame
Jeff Caldwell, Virginia
Pablo Aguilar, Virginia
Jean-Christophe Koffi, Virginia
Jon Bakero, Wake Forest
Michael DeShields, Wake Forest
Mark McKenzie, Wake Forest
**Andreu Cases Mundet, Wake Forest**

MVP in Bold

== See also ==
- Atlantic Coast Conference
- 2017 Atlantic Coast Conference men's soccer season
- 2017 NCAA Division I men's soccer season
- 2017 NCAA Division I Men's Soccer Championship
- 2017 ACC Women's Soccer Tournament
