= Koskinen Stadium =

Soccer and lacrosse venue at N.C., U.S.

Coordinates: 35.9958°N 78.9440°W

Freeman Field at Koskinen Stadium
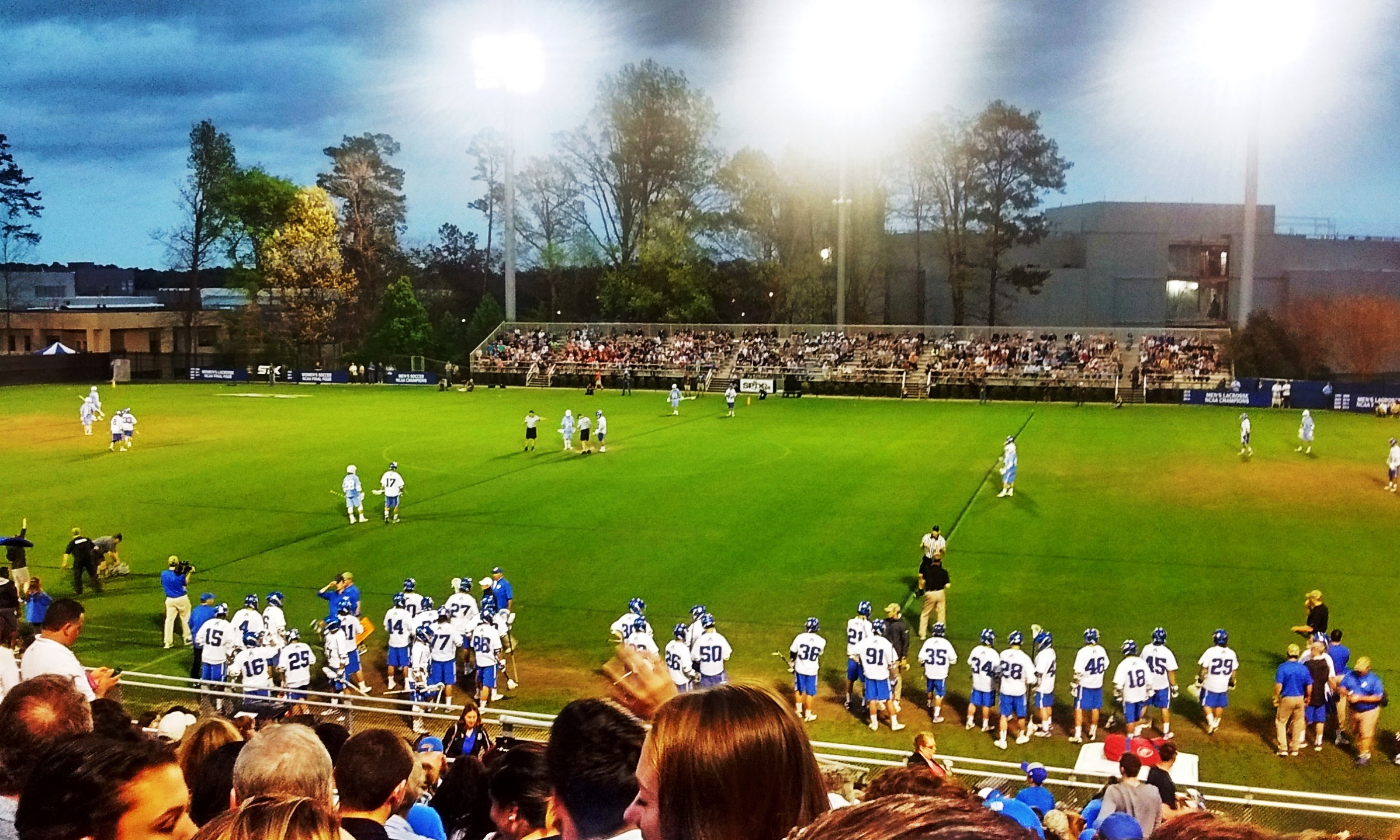
- The stadium during a lacrosse match in 2016
- Interactive map of Freeman Field at Koskinen Stadium
- Address: Durham, North Carolina; United States
- Owner: Duke University
- Operator: Duke University Athletics
- Capacity: 7,000
- Type: Stadium
- Surface: Bermuda grass
- Field size: 110 x 68 m
- Current use: Soccer; Lacrosse

Tenants
- Duke Blue Devils (NCAA) teams: Men' and Women's soccer; Men's and Women's lacrosse

Website
- goduke.com/koskinen-stadium

Koskinen Stadium is a 4,500-seat (7,000-capacity) stadium in Durham, North Carolina on the campus of Duke University. It serves as home to Duke's soccer and lacrosse teams.

The stadium is named in honor of Duke benefactors John Koskinen and Patricia Koskinen. In 2025 it was announced that the field was going to be named after alumnus and former Duke Football student-athlete, Heath Freeman (businessman).
