= Klöckner Stadium =

Stadium in Charlottesville, Virginia

Coordinates: 38°02′48.40″N 78°30′44.87″W

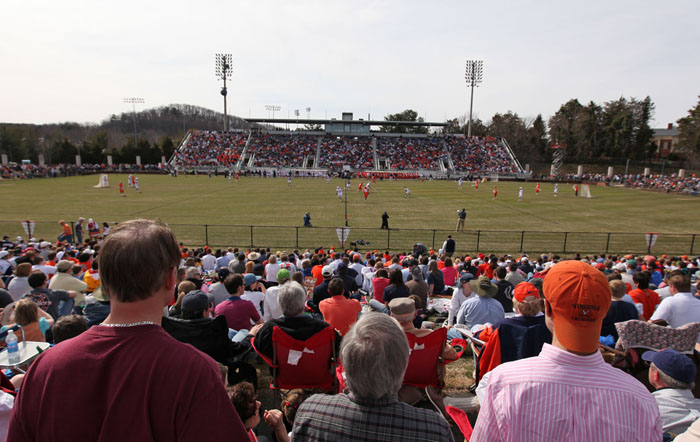
- The stadium during a Virginia v Syracuse lacrosse game, March 2010
- Interactive map of Klöckner Stadium
- Address: Copeley Rd; Charlottesville, VA; United States
- Owner: University of Virginia
- Operator: University of Virginia Department of Athletics
- Capacity: Grandstand: 3,600; Total: 7,100
- Surface: Prescription Athletic Turf

Construction
- Opened: August, 1992; 34 years ago
- Cost: $3.4 million
- Architect: VMDO Architects

Tenants
- Virginia Cavaliers (NCAA) teams: Men's and women's soccer; Men's and Women's lacrosse

Website
- virginiasports.com/klockner-stadium

Klöckner Stadium is a stadium that is located on the campus of the University of Virginia in Charlottesville, Virginia. The stadium is home to the Virginia Cavaliers's men's and women's soccer teams in the fall, and the men's and women's lacrosse teams in the spring.

The stadium was designed by VMDO Architects and it was built in 1992 at a cost of $3.4 million, and its naming rights were awarded to the Klöckner Group of Germany for $1.2 million.

== History ==
The Virginia men's soccer team won national championships in the first three years they played at Klöckner and subsequently added two more since in 2009 and 2014.

Additionally, both Virginia lacrosse teams have won national championships while at Klöckner—1999, 2003, 2006, 2011, 2019, and 2021 for the men, and 1993 and 2004 for the women (who were also national runners-up in 2005 and 2007).

The fourth team playing at the stadium, women's soccer, participated in the 1991, 2013, 2014, and 2020 NCAA Final Fours.

The largest soccer crowd to see a game at Klöckner Stadium was on September 28, 2007, when 7,906 fans watched an ACC game against Virginia Tech. The largest lacrosse crowd was first seen on April 12, 2008, when a game against Duke University attracted the stadium capacity, 8,000 spectators. When Duke University returned to Klöckner Stadium on April 17, 2010, the stadium capacity of 8,000 was reached again. As at Scott Stadium (the prior home of Virginia's soccer and lacrosse teams), some spectators sit or stand in the grassy areas behind each goal, as well as in the bleachers.

During the 2006 soccer season, a video board was installed at Klöckner Stadium. It debuted on September 27, 2006, during a men's soccer game between Virginia and American University. The video board was upgraded prior to the 2019 season.
