= W. Dennie Spry Soccer Stadium =

Soccer stadium in Winston-Salem, North Carolina

Coordinates: 36°8′18.42″N 80°16′44.07″W

Spry Stadium
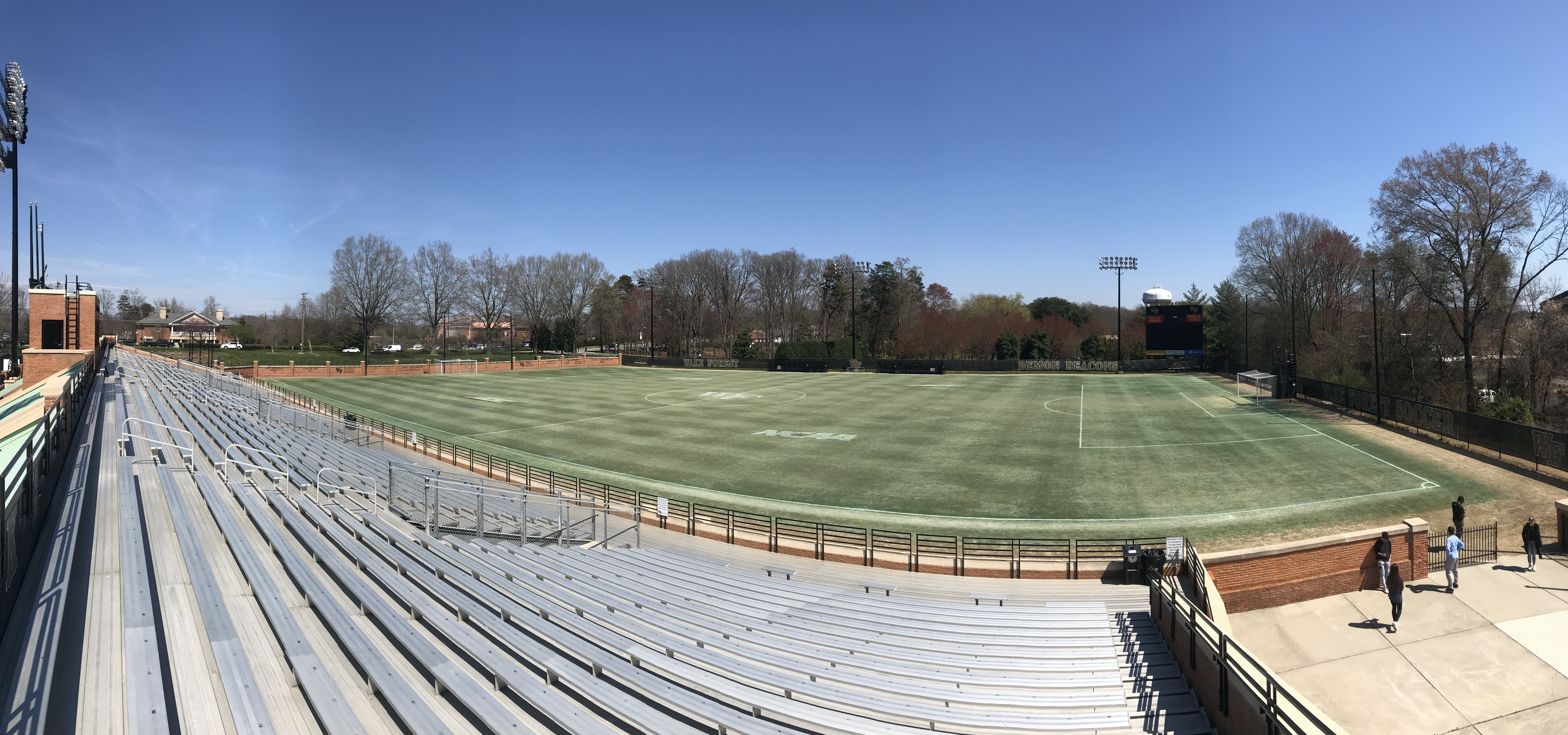
- View of the stadium in 2019
- Interactive map of Spry Stadium
- Full name: W. Dennie Spry Soccer Stadium
- Address: Winston-Salem, NC; United States
- Owner: Wake Forest University
- Operator: Wake Forest University Athletics
- Capacity: 3,000
- Type: Stadium
- Surface: Natural grass
- Current use: Soccer

Construction
- Opened: 1996; 30 years ago

Tenants
- Wake Forest Demon Deacons (NCAA): men's and women's soccer

Website
- godeacs.com/spry-stadium

W. Dennie Spry Soccer Stadium (usually called Spry Stadium) is a soccer-specific stadium located on the campus of Wake Forest University in Winston-Salem, North Carolina where it is home to the Wake Forest Demon Deacons' men's and women's soccer teams.

The venue was named in honor of William Dennie Spry, a retired partner in the Winston-Salem law firm of "Allman Spry Davis Leggett & Crumpler".

== History ==
Opened in 1996, W. Dennie Spry Soccer Stadium is home to the Wake Forest men's and women's soccer programs. Considered one of the top college soccer facilities in the country, the 3,000-seat stadium is considered a jewel in Wake Forest's family of athletic facilities and gives the Demon Deacons a true home field advantage.

The Spry Stadium complex features a fully lit natural grass playing field along with two lit natural grass practice fields. The facility also includes a state-of-the-art scoreboard and sound system, locker rooms for both the men's and women's teams, a pressbox with rooftop observation deck and concession stands. The Deacons regularly play in front of packed crowds, as the campus and local communities support the men's and women's teams. A strong contingent of students can always be found on the hill overlooking the north side of the stadium.

Spry Stadium has hosted several major soccer events. The ACC Tournament has been contested four times at Spry: the women's tournament was held there in 1997, while the men's event was held at the venue for three straight years from 1998 to 2000.

In March 2001, Spry Stadium hosted a Major League Soccer exhibition match between the Miami Fusion and D.C. United and an exhibition match between Wake Forest and the United States U-17 National Team.

Spry Stadium was one of the hosts for the 2020 NCAA Division I Men's Soccer Tournament and the 2020 NCAA Division I Women's Soccer Tournament.
