= 2018 Big Ten Conference men's soccer season =

- League: NCAA Division I
- Sport: Soccer
- Duration: August 24, 2018 – October 28, 2018
- Teams: 9

2019 MLS SuperDraft
- Top draft pick: Griffin Dorsey, 9th overall
- Picked by: Toronto FC

Regular Season
- Season champions: Indiana
- Runners-up: Wisconsin
- Season MVP: FW: Jack Hallahan; MF: Giuseppe Barone; DF: Andrew Gutman; GK: Trey Muse

Tournament
- Champions: Indiana
- Runners-up: Michigan
- Finals MVP: Andrew Gutman

Big Ten Conference men's soccer seasons
- ← 2017 2019 →

2018 Big Ten Conference men's soccer standings
	Conf.					Overall
Team	W		L		T	W		L		T
No. 3 Indiana ‡	8	–	0	–	0	20	–	3	–	1
Wisconsin	6	–	2	–	0	10	–	6	–	2
No. 4 Michigan State +	4	–	2	–	2	14	–	5	–	4
No. 24 Michigan +	4	–	2	–	2	12	–	5	–	4
No. 1 Maryland +	4	–	4	–	0	12	–	6	–	4
Penn State	3	–	3	–	2	6	–	9	–	2
Rutgers	2	–	6	–	0	4	–	13	–	1
Northwestern	0	–	5	–	3	6	–	9	–	5
Ohio State	0	–	7	–	1	1	–	15	–	2
$ – Conference champion; As of December 11, 2018; Rankings from United Soccer Coaches Poll; Source:The Big Ten Conference

The 2018 Big Ten Conference men's soccer season was the 28th season of men's varsity soccer in the conference. The regular season began on August 24, 2018, and concluded on October 28, 2018. The season culminated with the 2018 Big Ten Conference Men's Soccer Tournament to determine the conference's automatic berth into the 2018 NCAA Division I Men's Soccer Tournament. Michigan entered the season as the defending regular season champions, while Wisconsin entered the season as the defending tournament champions.

Indiana went on to win both the regular season and the tournament, winning all eight of their Big Ten Conference games. They defeated Michigan in the Big Ten Men's Soccer Championship Game.

With the Big Ten title, Indiana earned the conference's automatic berth into the 2018 NCAA Tournament, where Maryland, Michigan, and Michigan State joined as at-large berths. The conference had the strongest showing in the NCAA Tournament, where three of their four berths reached the College Cup (Final Four) of the tournament. Big Ten side, Maryland, would defeat Akron in the National Championship Game to win their fourth NCAA title, and their first since 2008.

Concluding the tournament, Indiana senior and captain, Andrew Gutman, won the TopDrawerSoccer.com National Player of the Year Award as well as the Missouri Athletic Club's Hermann Trophy. Gutman would forgo an opportunity to sign a homegrown contract with the Chicago Fire and signed with Celtic in Scotland. Indiana sophomore forward, Griffin Dorsey was the highest Big Ten player selected in the 2019 MLS SuperDraft, being drafted by Toronto FC ninth overall. Eleven other Big Ten players were selected in the MLS SuperDraft, the most of any collegiate conference, and an additional four signed homegrown player contracts with their parent MLS clubs.

== Background ==
=== Head coaches ===
As of the 2017 season

Team	Head coach	Previous job	Years at school	Overall record	Record at school	Big Ten record	NCAA Tournaments	NCAA College Cups	NCAA Titles
Indiana	Todd Yeagley	Wisconsin	8	109–51–35 (.649)	102–42–33 (.669)	27–15–18 (.600)	9	2	1
Maryland	Sasho Cirovski	Hartford	25	400–150–56 (.706)	374–137–49 (.712)	20–5–7 (.734)	24	8	2
Michigan	Chaka Daley	Providence	6	139–160–44 (.469)	49–49–17 (.500)	19–18–7 (.511)	2	0	0
Michigan State	Damon Rensing	Michigan State (assistant)	9	103–61–26 (.611)	103–61–26 (.611)	27–24–11 (.524)	7	0	0
Northwestern	Tim Lenahan	Lafayette	18	289–200–67 (.580)	163–131–46 (.547)	36–55–17 (.412)	9	0	0
Ohio State	John Bluem	Fresno State	22	292–201–70 (.581)	206–161–58 (.553)	63–54–13 (.535)	9	1	0
Penn State	Jeff Cook	Bethlehem Steel (asst.)	1	0–0–0 (–)	0–0–0 (–)	0–0–0 (–)	0	0	0
Rutgers	Dan Donigan	Saint Louis	9	169–124–37 (.568)	51–82–15 (.395)	5–24–3 (.203)	2	0	0
Wisconsin	John Trask	UIC	9	119–90–53 (.555)	65–66–27 (.497)	20–26–10 (.446)	2	0	0

== Preseason ==
=== Preseason poll ===
The preseason poll was released on August 15.

	Team ranking
1.	Indiana
2.	Michigan State
3.	Maryland
4.	Michigan
5.	Wisconsin
T-6.	Ohio State
T-6.	Penn State
8.	Northwestern
9.	Rutgers

=== Preseason national polls ===
Five of the programs were ranked in one of the five major preseason polls. CollegeSoccerNews.com and Hero Sports use a Top 30 ranking throughout the season, while United Soccer, Soccer America, and TopDrawer Soccer use a Top 25 ranking throughout the season.

	United; Soccer	CSN	Hero; Sports	Soccer; America	TopDrawer; Soccer
Indiana	2	2	2	1	5
Maryland	NR	23	22	16	21
Michigan	21	17	28	11	15
Michigan State	7	4	10	4	9
Northwestern	NR	NR	NR	NR	NR
Ohio State	NR	NR	NR	NR	NR
Penn State	NR	NR	NR	NR	NR
Rutgers	NR	NR	NR	NR	NR
Wisconsin	12	26	13	NR	18

== Regular season ==
=== Early season tournaments ===
Three Big Ten teams participated in four early season tournaments, three of which they themselves hosted.

Team	Tournament	Finish
Indiana	adidas/IU Credit Union Classic	1st
Northwestern	Lakeside Classic	1st
Ohio State	Dayton Classic	4th
Ohio State	Wolstein Classic	3rd

== Postseason ==
=== Big Ten Tournament ===
The Big Ten Tournament was held from November 3–11. The semifinal and championship rounds were held at Grand Park in Westfield, Indiana. Indiana won the Big Ten Tournament, defeating Michigan in the final.

Semifinals; November 9
1	Indiana (p)	1 (4)
5	Maryland	1 (3)
3	Michigan	1
2	Wisconsin	0

Final; November 11
1	Indiana	3
3	Michigan	0

=== NCAA Tournament ===
Seed	Region	School	1st Round	2nd Round	3rd Round	Quarterfinals	Semifinals	Championship
2	Bloomington	Indiana	BYE	W 4–0 vs. Connecticut – (Bloomington, IN)	W 2–0 vs. Air Force – (Bloomington, IN)	W 1–0 vs. #7 Notre Dame – (Bloomington, IN)	L 0–2 vs. #11 Maryland – (Santa Barbara, CA)	
11	Lexington	Maryland	BYE	W 1–0 vs. NC State – (College Park, MD)	W 2–0 vs. #6 Duke – (Durham, NC)	W 1–0 vs. #3 Kentucky – (Lexington, KY)	W 2–0 vs. #2 Indiana – (Santa Barbara, CA)	W 1–0 vs. Akron – (Santa Barbara, CA)
—	Bloomington	Michigan	T 1–1 (W 11–10 PK) vs. Princeton – (Ann Arbor, MI)	T 0–0 (L 11–12 PK) vs. #7 Notre Dame – (South Bend, IN)				
—	Louisville	Michigan State	W 2–0 vs. UIC – (East Lansing, MI)	W 2–1 (OT) vs. #4 Louisville – (Louisville, KY)	W 1–0 vs. #13 Georgetown – (Washington, DC)	W 2–1 vs. James Madison– (East Lansing, MI)	L 1–5 vs. Akron – (Santa Barbara, CA)	
		W–L–T (%):	1–0–1 (.750)	3–0–1 (.875)	3–0–0 (1.000)	3–0–0 (1.000)	1–2–0 (.333)	1–0–0 (1.000) Total: 12–2–2 (.813)

== Rankings ==
=== National rankings ===
	Improvement in ranking
	Drop in ranking
RV	Received votes but were not ranked in Top 25
NV	No votes received

		Pre	Wk 1	Wk 2	Wk 3	Wk 4	Wk 5	Wk 6	Wk 7	Wk 8	Wk 9	Wk 10	Wk 11	Wk 12	Wk 13	Wk 14	Wk 15	Wk 16	Final
Indiana	USC	2	6	4	2	2	2	2	4	2	2	2	2	1	None released				3
Indiana	TDS	5	5	3	5	2	2	2	2	4	4	4	3	3	1	1	1	1	3
Maryland	USC	RV	NV	NV	NV	NV	NV	NV	NV	NV	NV	NV	NV	15	None released				1
Maryland	TDS	21	21	NV	NV	NV	NV	NV	RV	NV	NV	22	RV	10	10	8	7	3	1
Michigan	USC	21	NV	RV	RV	21	19	14	16	18	RV	RV	RV	RV	None released				24
Michigan	TDS	15	15	NV	NV	NV	NV	NV	22	18	17	RV	NV	NV	NV	21	21	21	21
Michigan State	USC	7	5	3	4	5	5	13	8	13	12	17	RV	RV	None released				4
Michigan State	TDS	9	9	11	13	7	7	9	16	13	14	20	17	19	25	7	5	4	4
Northwestern	USC	NV	NV	NV	NV	NV	NV	NV	NV	NV	NV	NV	NV	NV	None released				NV
Northwestern	TDS	NV	NV	NV	NV	NV	NV	NV	NV	NV	NV	NV	NV	NV	NV	NV	NV	NV	NV
Ohio State	USC	NV	NV	NV	NV	NV	NV	NV	NV	NV	NV	NV	NV	NV	None released				NV
Ohio State	TDS	NV	NV	NV	NV	NV	NV	NV	NV	NV	NV	NV	NV	NV	NV	NV	NV	NV	NV
Penn State	USC	NV	NV	NV	NV	NV	NV	NV	NV	NV	NV	NV	NV	NV	None released				NV
Penn State	TDS	NV	NV	NV	NV	NV	NV	NV	NV	NV	NV	NV	NV	NV	NV	NV	NV	NV	NV
Rutgers	USC	NV	NV	NV	NV	NV	NV	NV	NV	NV	NV	NV	NV	NV	None released				NV
Rutgers	TDS	NV	NV	NV	NV	NV	NV	NV	NV	NV	NV	NV	NV	NV	NV	NV	NV	NV	NV
Wisconsin	USC	12	RV	NV	NV	NV	NV	RV	RV	NV	NV	NV	RV	NV	None released				NV
Wisconsin	TDS	18	18	NV	NV	NV	NV	NV	NV	NV	NV	NV	NV	NV	NV	NV	NV	NV	NV

== Awards and honors ==
=== Player of the week honors ===
Week	Offensive			Defensive		
Week	Player	Position	Team	Player	Position	Team
Week 1	A.J. Palazzolo	MF	Indiana	Jimmy Hague	GK	Michigan State
Week 1	A.J. Palazzolo	MF	Indiana	Miha Mišković	GK	Northwestern
Week 2	Andrew Gutman	DF	Indiana	Trey Muse	GK	Indiana
Week 3	DeJuan Jones	FW	Michigan State	Miha Mišković	GK	Northwestern
Week 4	William Herve	MF	Maryland	Jackson Ragen	DF	Michigan
Week 5	Ryan Sierakowski	FW	Michigan State	Ryan Gallagher	DF	Penn State
Week 6	Umar Farouk Osman	FW	Michigan	Dean Cowdroy	GK	Wisconsin
Week 7	Noah Melick	FW	Wisconsin	Patrick Nielsen	DF	Michigan State
Week 7	Noah Melick	FW	Wisconsin	Josh Levine	GK	Penn State
Week 8	Andrew Gutman	DF	Indiana	Dani Marks	DF	Penn State
Week 9	Trevor Swartz	MF	Indiana	Dean Cowdroy	GK	Wisconsin
Week 10	Andrew Gutman	DF	Indiana	Trey Muse	GK	Indiana

=== Postseason honors ===
2018 Big Ten Men's Soccer Individual Awards
Award	Recipient(s)
Offensive Player of the Year	Chris Mueller, Wisconsin
Defensive Player of the Year	Grant Lillard, Indiana
Midfielder of the Year	Eryk Williamson, Maryland
Goalkeeper of the Year	Jimmy Hague, Michigan State
Coach of the Year	Chaka Daley, Michigan
Freshman of the Year	Mason Toye, Indiana

2018 Big Ten Men's Soccer All-Conference Teams
First Team Honorees	Second Team Honorees	All-Freshman Team Honorees	Sportsmanship Award Honorees
Forwards: Chris Mueller, Sr., Wisconsin; Mason Toye, Fr., Indiana; Jack Hallahan, So., Michigan Midfield: Eryk Williamson, Jr., Maryland; Ken Krolicki, Sr., Michigan State; Jake Rozhansky, Sr., Maryland; Francesco Moore, Jr., Indiana Defense: Grant Lillard, Sr., Indiana; Jimmy Fiscus, Sr., Michigan State; Andrew Gutman, Jr., Indiana Goalkeeper: Jimmy Hague, Jr., Michigan State	Forwards: Griffin Dorsey, Fr., Indiana; Francis Atuahene, Jr., Michigan; DeJuan Jones, Jr., Michigan State; Ryan Sierakowski, Jr., Michigan State Midfield: Abdi Mohamed, Jr., Ohio State; Charles Mertz, Jr., Michigan; Mark Segbers, Sr., Wisconsin Defense: Donovan Pines, So., Maryland; Timmy Mehl, Jr., Indiana; Marcello Borges, Jr., Michigan Goalkeeper: Trey Muse, Fr., Indiana	Mohammed Zakyi, Michigan; Marc Ybarra, Michigan; Umar Farouk Osman, Michigan; Garrett Opperman, Northwestern; Ethan Beckford, Penn State; Mason Toye, Indiana; Griffin Dorsey, Indiana; Trey Muse, Indiana; Tommy Katsyiannis, Northwestern; Vincent Borden, Rutgers; Bryce Washington, Rutgers	Jack Griffith, Sr., Indiana; Andrew Samuels, Jr., Maryland; Tristan Jacob, Sr., Michigan; Brad Centala, Sr., Michigan State; Francisco Tomasino, Sr., Northwestern; Hunter Robertson, Sr., Ohio State; Dani Marks, Jr., Penn State; Erik Sa, Sr., Rutgers; Isaac Schenkler, Jr., Wisconsin

=== National awards ===
Award	Winner	School	Ref.
Hermann Trophy	Andrew Gutman	Indiana	
TDS National POTY Award	Andrew Gutman	Indiana	

== 2019 MLS draft ==
Five 2018 Big Ten Conference men's soccer season players were drafted in the first round of the 2018 draft (Griffin Dorsey — 6th, Dayne St. Clair — 7th, DeJuan Jones — 11th, Chase Gaspers — 15th, Ryan Sierakowski — 23rd) and 12 were drafted overall in the draft.

Rnd.	Pick	Player	Pos.	Team	School
1	6	Griffin Dorsey	FW	Toronto FC	Indiana (So.)
1	7	Dayne St. Clair	GK	Minnesota United	Maryland (Sr.)
1	11	DeJuan Jones	MF	New England Revolution	Michigan State (Sr.)
1	15	Chase Gasper	DF	New England Revolution	Maryland (R-Sr.)
1	23	Ryan Sierakowski	FW	Portland Timbers	Michigan State (Sr.)
2	28	Marcello Borges	DF	Colorado Rapids	Michigan (Jr.)
2	30	Jimmy Hague	GK	FC Cincinnati	Michigan State (R-Sr.)
2	32	Rece Buckmaster	DF	New York Red Bulls	Indiana (Sr.)
2	33	Andrew Samuels	DF	Houston Dynamo	Maryland (Sr.)
2	34	Amar Sejdič	MF	Montreal Impact	Maryland (Sr.)
3	71	Francesco Moore	DF	Portland Timbers	Indiana (Sr.)
4	76	Robbie Mertz	MF	Colorado Rapids	Michigan (Jr.)

== Homegrown players ==
The Homegrown Player Rule is a Major League Soccer program that allows MLS teams to sign local players from their own development academies directly to MLS first team rosters. Before the creation of the rule in 2008, every player entering Major League Soccer had to be assigned through one of the existing MLS player allocation processes, such as the MLS SuperDraft.

To place a player on its homegrown player list, making him eligible to sign as a homegrown player, players must have resided in that club's home territory and participated in the club's youth development system for at least one year. Players can play college soccer and still be eligible to sign a homegrown contract.

Four 2018 Big Ten Conference men's soccer season players signed homegrown contracts with their parent clubs ahead of the 2019 MLS season.

Original MLS team	Player	Pos.	School	Ref.
Chicago Fire	Jeremiah Gutjahr	DF	Indiana (Sr.)	
D.C. United	Donovan Pines	DF	Maryland (Jr.)	
New England Revolution	Justin Rennicks	MF	Indiana (So.)	
Seattle Sounders FC	Trey Muse	GK	Indiana (So.)	
