= 2018 NCAA Division I men's soccer championship game =

NCAA Division I men's soccer championship game
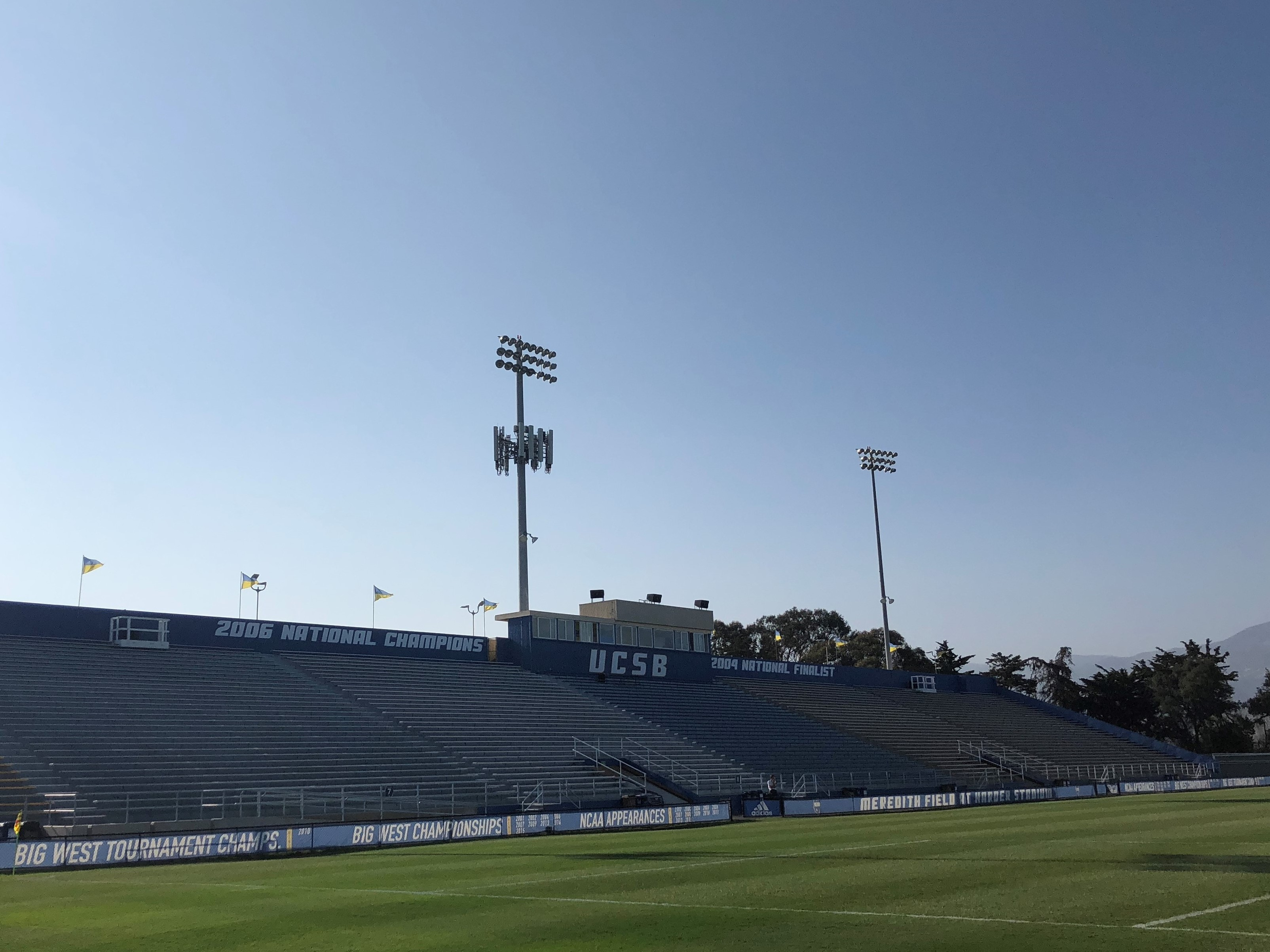
- Harder Stadium hosted the final
- Event: 2018 NCAA Division I Men's Soccer Tournament
Maryland	Akron
Big Ten	Mid-American
1	0
- Date: December 9, 2018
- Venue: Harder Stadium, Santa Barbara, California
- Referee: Chris Penso
- Attendance: 4,858
- Weather: Party Cloudy and 62 °F (17 °C)

The 2018 NCAA Division I men's soccer championship game was the final game of the 2018 NCAA Division I Men's Soccer Tournament, determining the national champion for the 2018 NCAA Division I men's soccer season. The match was played on December 9, 2018 at Harder Stadium in Santa Barbara, California, a soccer-specific stadium that is home to UC Santa Barbara Gauchos men's and women's soccer programs.

The match was contested between the 2018 MAC Men's Soccer Tournament champions, Akron, and the Big Ten Tournament, semifinalists, Maryland. Maryland ultimately won the match 1-0 thanks to a penalty kick goal from Amar Sejdić in the 57th minute of play. Sejdić was named the tournament's Most Outstanding Player for his performance. Maryland went through the entire tournament without conceding a single goal.

Marked by the media as a "redemption final", the final features two men's soccer heavyweights: Akron and Maryland. Both teams, while regularly successful over the last two decades, have not won an NCAA title in nearly a decade each. During the 2018 campaign, both programs had a slump early on in the season that nearly saw both teams miss out on the NCAA Tournament. A late season resurgence by both programs allowed both to reach the NCAA final.

The three-time defending champions, Stanford, were eliminated in the quarterfinals by Akron. The match was broadcast on ESPN2.

== Road to the final ==
The NCAA Division I Men's Soccer Tournament, sometimes known as the College Cup, is an American intercollegiate soccer tournament conducted by the National Collegiate Athletic Association (NCAA), and determines the Division I men's national champion. The tournament has been formally held since 1959, when it was an eight-team tournament. Since then, the tournament has expanded to 48 teams, in which every Division I conference tournament champion is allocated a berth. The tournament was the first final since 2014 to not feature Stanford in the match. It was Akron's first appearance since 2010, which they won their lone NCAA title against Louisville, and Maryland's first appearance since 2013, where they lost to Notre Dame. Maryland has won the NCAA Tournament on three previous occasions: 1968, 2005, and 2008.

Maryland (Big Ten)		Round	Akron (MAC)	
Opponent	Result	Conference Tournament	Opponent	Result
Michigan State	1–0 (A)	Quarterfinals	SIUE	2–1 (N)
Indiana	1–1 (N)	Semifinals	West Virginia	3–1 (A)
did not qualify	—	Championship	Western Michigan	3–0 (N)
Opponent	Result	NCAA Tournament	Opponent	Result
Bye	—	First Round	Rider (MAAC)	3–1 (H)
NC State (ACC)	2–0 (H)	Second Round	Syracuse (ACC)	3–1 (A)
Duke (ACC)	2–0 (A)	Third Round (Sweet 16)	Wake Forest (ACC)	1–0 (A)
Kentucky (C-USA)	1–0 (A)	Quarterfinals (Elite 8)	Stanford (Pac-12)	3–2 (A)
Indiana (Big Ten)	2–0 (N)	College Cup (Final 4)	Michigan State (Big Ten)	5–1 (N)

=== Akron ===
Akron entered the championship match on a nine-match winning streak, with their last defeat coming on October 20 at Northern Illinois. The program began the season ranked fourth in the nation in the United Soccer Coaches poll and second in the nation in the TopDrawer Soccer poll. A slow start to the season saw the Zips fall to a 1–3–1 record and slip out of the national rankings. Following the early skid, the Zips rebounded to win their next three straight matches. This was hallmarked by a 10–0 victory of Canisius, making it the program's largest win in history. Akron earned a pair of subsequent road wins at Grand Canyon and at VCU.

Akron began conference play with a scoreless draw at Bowling Green. A chain of inconsistent performances saw the Zips lose at home to West Virginia and Syracuse, but nab victories against Michigan State and Creighton, who were both ranked in the USC Top 10 at the time.

The Zips finished the Mid-American Conference regular season in fourth place, making it the programs poorest regular season performance in MAC play since joining the conference. In the MAC Tournament, the Zips had a season resurgence, winning all of their tournament matches in regulation, en route to their 7th straight Mid-American Conference Men's Soccer Tournament title, and their 11th MAC title in the last 14 years. The championship was a rematch of last year's championship, where the Zips took on Western Michigan. The win guaranteed that the Zips would return to the NCAA Tournament, where their chances prior to the tournament had been on the bubble.

The Zips did not earn a seed in the NCAA Tournament for the first time since 2013. In the first round, Akron hosted Rider, where they won 3–1. The victory led to a rematch against Syracuse. The match, played at nearby Colgate University, was a triumph for Akron, as they won by the same 3–1 score. The Zips then took on top-seed Wake Forest in the Sweet Sixteen, and earned a 1–0 away victory. In the Elite Eight, Akron took on Stanford, the three-time defending NCAA champions. Akron had been eliminated in penalties for the last 2 tournaments by Stanford. In the match, Akron avenged their losses, and won 3–2 at Stanford booking their spot in the College Cup. There, the Zips prevailed 5–1 against Michigan State, making it the most lopsided semifinal match in nearly 20 years.

== Pre-match ==
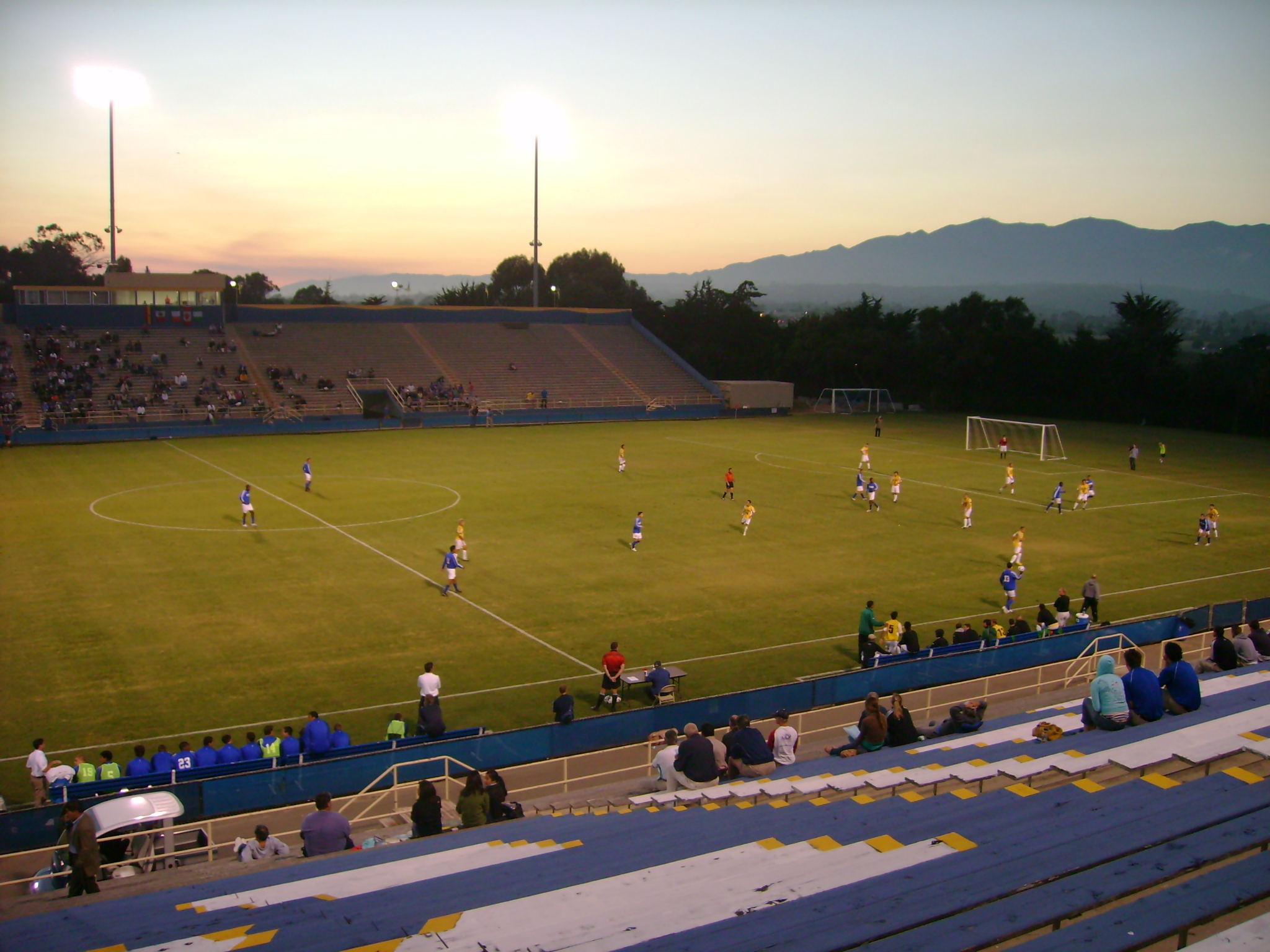
Harder Stadium in Santa Barbara hosted the 2018 Men's College Cup.

=== Venue selection ===
The National Collegiate Athletic Association determined the host of the final on April 18, 2017. The announcement of Meredith Field at Harder Stadium was in conjunction with WakeMed Soccer Park being announced as the 2019 and 2021 College Cup venue, while Harder Stadium would host the College Cup again in 2020.

=== Analysis ===
Ahead of the match, both programs had a similar storyline of having a late season resurgence. Akron was considered by some to be the favorite given their longer run of form, and their emphatic win over Michigan State.

== Match ==
=== Details ===
December 9, 2018
8:00 PM EST

Maryland	1–0	Akron
Sejdič 57' (pen.)	Report

Harder Stadium, Santa Barbara
Attendance: 4,858
Referee: Chris Penso

Maryland	Akron

GK	99	(Canada) Dayne St. Clair
RB	25	(United States) Ben Di Rosa
CB	2	(United States) Donovan Pines
CB	5	(Germany) Johannes Bergmann
LB	28	(United States) Chase Gasper		(yellow card) 10'
RM	20	(United States) Eli Crognale	(substituted off) 77'
AM	10	(Bosnia and Herzegovina) Amar Sejdic		57' (pen.)
LM	13	(United States) Andrew Samuels (c)
RW	18	(South Korea) Paul Bin	(substituted off) 60'
LW	8	(France) William James Herve	(substituted off) 61'
CF	9	(United States) Sebastian Elney	(substituted off) 81'
Substitutes:
FW	11	(United States) D. J. Reeves	(substituted in) 61'
FW	15	(United States) Eric Matzelevich	(substituted in) 81'
FW	21	(France) Vinicius Lansade	(substituted in) 77'
MF	27	(United States) Matt Di Rosa	(substituted in) 61'
Manager:
(North Macedonia) Sasho Cirovski

GK	1	(Germany) Ben Lundt		(yellow card) 75'
RB	26	(Somalia) Abdi Mohamed
CB	3	(Italy) Carlo Ritaccio (c)		(red card) 80'
CB	25	(United States) Daniel Strachan
LB	4	(Italy) Marco Milanese	(substituted off) 61'
DM	6	(United States) Skye Harter		(yellow card) 88'
CM	12	(United States) Colin Biros	(substituted off) 78'
CM	16	(United States) Sam Tojaga
AM	8	(United States) Morgan Hackworth	(substituted off) 61'
ST	9	(Nigeria) David Egbo
ST	10	(Canada) Marcel Zajac
Substitutes:
DF	2	(Spain) Pol Hernández	(substituted in) 61' (substituted off) 87'
FW	7	(Eritrea) Ezana Kahsay	(substituted in) 78' (substituted off) 81'	(yellow card) 81'
MF	10	(Italy) Marco Micaletto	(substituted in) 61'
MF	14	(Portugal) Diogo Pacheco	(substituted in) 87'
DF	27	(Republic of Ireland) Declan Watters	(substituted in) 81'
Manager:
(United States) Jared Embick

College Cup MVP
Amar Sejdic (Maryland)

Assistant referees:
Danny Thornberry (United States)
Tom Felice (United States)
Fourth official:
Chris Penso (United States)

Match rules:

- 90 minutes.
- 20 minutes of extra time if necessary.
- Penalty shoot-out if scores still level.
- Unlimited substitutes, may not return if subbed out in the first half; may return unlimited times in the second half.

=== Statistics ===
Overall
	Maryland	Akron
Goals scored	1	0
Total shots	15	10
Shots on target	8	2
Saves	2	7
Corner kicks	7	5
Fouls committed	10	7
Offsides	0	0
Yellow cards	1	3
Red cards	0	1
