= 2018 Michigan Wolverines men's soccer team =

Sports team

2018 Michigan Wolverines men's soccer

NCAA Tournament
- Conference: Big Ten Conference
- Record: 12–5–2 (4–2–2 Big Ten)
- Head coach: Chaka Daley (7th season)
- Assistant coaches: Tommy McMenemy (9th season); Jhojan Obando (7th season); Marcos Ugarte (2nd season)
- Home stadium: U-M Soccer Stadium

2018 Big Ten Conference men's soccer standings
	Conf.					Overall
Team	W		L		T	W		L		T
No. 3 Indiana ‡	8	–	0	–	0	20	–	3	–	1
Wisconsin	6	–	2	–	0	10	–	6	–	2
No. 4 Michigan State +	4	–	2	–	2	14	–	5	–	4
No. 24 Michigan +	4	–	2	–	2	12	–	5	–	4
No. 1 Maryland +	4	–	4	–	0	12	–	6	–	4
Penn State	3	–	3	–	2	6	–	9	–	2
Rutgers	2	–	6	–	0	4	–	13	–	1
Northwestern	0	–	5	–	3	6	–	9	–	5
Ohio State	0	–	7	–	1	1	–	15	–	2
$ – Conference champion; As of December 11, 2018; Rankings from United Soccer Coaches Poll; Source:The Big Ten Conference

The 2018 Michigan Wolverines men's soccer team is the college's 19th season of playing organized men's college soccer. It is the Wolverines' 19th season playing in the Big Ten Conference.

== Background ==
Michigan finished 1st in the Big Ten Conference regular season in 2017 with a 12–6–2 overall record and a 6–1–1 in-conference record. Michigan won in the quarterfinal of the Big Ten Tournament against Northwestern but lost in the semifinal to eventual champion Wisconsin. The team earned a spot in the NCAA tournament as a seeded team, and received a bye to the second round. However, the team lost to Colgate 2–3.

== Roster ==
Note: Flags indicate national team as defined under FIFA eligibility rules; some limited exceptions apply. Players may hold more than one non-FIFA nationality.

No.	Pos.	Nation	Player
1	GK	USA	Andrew Verdi
2	DF	USA	Marcello Borges
3	DF	USA	Peter Brown
4	DF	CAN	Joel Harrison
5	DF	CAN	Abdou Samake
6	DF	ENG	Daniel Mukuna
7	FW	USA	Derick Broche
8	MF	CHI	Ivo Cerda
9	FW	GHA	Mohammed Zakyi
10	MF	GHA	Umar Farouk Osman
11	FW	ENG	Jack Hallahan
12	MF	USA	Austin Swiech
13	DF	USA	Declan Gaffney
14	MF	USA	Robbie Mertz

No.	Pos.	Nation	Player
15	MF	USA	Carlos Tellez
16	FW	USA	Noah Kleedtke
17	FW	CAN	Sosa Emovon
18	GK	USA	Henry Mashburn
19	MF	USA	Kevin Buca
20	MF	USA	Aidan Nam
22	MF	USA	Joe Hertgen
23	MF	USA	Marc Ybarra
24	MF	USA	Lucas Rosendall
25	MF	USA	Jackson Ragen
26	DF	HKG	C.Y. Cheng
27	DF	USA	Nash Pirie
28	GK	USA	Jacob Nunner

== Competitions ==
=== Preseason ===
August 18	Michigan	2–0	Loyola	Ann Arbor, Michigan
7:00 pm ET		Report		Stadium: U-M Soccer Stadium

=== Regular season ===
August 24 1	Michigan	1–2	Tulsa	Ann Arbor, Michigan
7:00 pm ET		Report		Stadium: U-M Soccer Stadium; Attendance: 581; Referee: Tony Russo

August 27 2	Michigan	2–0	South Florida	Ann Arbor, Michigan
7:00 pm ET		Report		Stadium: U-M Soccer Stadium; Attendance: 657; Referee: Peter Dhima

August 31 3	Michigan	3–0	UC Riverside	Ann Arbor, Michigan
7:00 pm ET		Report		Stadium: U-M Soccer Stadium; Attendance: 806; Referee: Gregory Dopka

September 3 4	Michigan	Canceled	Canisius	Ann Arbor, Michigan
1:00 pm ET		Report		Stadium: U-M Soccer Stadium

September 7 5	Michigan	3–2 (OT)	Western Michigan	Ann Arbor, Michigan
7:30 pm ET		Report		Stadium: U-M Soccer Stadium; Attendance: 2,245; Referee: Heber Estrada

September 10 6	Michigan	3–0	Marquette	Ann Arbor, Michigan
7:30 pm ET		Report		Stadium: U-M Soccer Stadium; Attendance: 490; Referee: Cesar Ibarra

September 14 7	Rutgers	0–2	Michigan	New Brunswick, NJ
8:00 pm ET		Report		Stadium: Yurcak Field; Attendance: 1,287; Referee: Dimitar Chavdarov

September 21 8	Michigan	1–1 (2OT)	Penn State	Ann Arbor, Michigan
7:00 pm ET		Report		Stadium: U-M Soccer Stadium; Attendance: 1,755; Referee: Nikola Aleksic

September 25 9	Michigan	3–1	Ohio State	Ann Arbor, Michigan
7:00 pm ET		Report		Stadium: U-M Soccer Stadium; Attendance: 759; Referee: Calin Radosav

September 29 10	Northwestern	0–2	Michigan	Evanston, IL
9:00 pm ET		Report		Stadium: Lanny and Sharon Martin Stadium; Attendance: 378; Referee: Carmen Sebio

October 3 11	Oakland	1–2	Michigan	Auburn Hills, Michigan
7:00 pm ET		Report		Stadium: Oakland Soccer Field; Attendance: 2,344; Referee: John Douglas

October 7 12	Michigan	0–1	Indiana	Ann Arbor, Michigan
3:00 pm ET		Report		Stadium: U-M Soccer Stadium; Attendance: 1,729; Referee: Carmen Serbio

October 10 13	Michigan	5–0	Detroit Mercy	Ann Arbor, Michigan
7:30 pm ET		Report		Stadium: U-M Soccer Stadium; Attendance: 660; Referee: Cesar Ibarra

October 16 14	Michigan	1–2	Notre Dame	Ann Arbor, Michigan
6:00 pm ET		Report		Stadium: U-M Soccer Stadium; Attendance: 1,536; Referee: Dimitar Chavdarov

October 19 15	Wisconsin	1–0 (OT)	Michigan	Madison, WI
8:00 pm ET		Report		Stadium: Dan McClimon Memorial Track/Soccer Complex; Attendance: 1,263; Referee: Calin Radosav

October 23 16	Michigan State	1–1 (2OT)	Michigan	East Lansing, MI
8:00 pm ET		Report		Stadium: DeMartin Soccer Complex; Attendance: 2,139

October 28 17	Michigan	2–1 (OT)	Maryland	Ann Arbor, Michigan
4:00 pm ET		Report		Stadium: U-M Soccer Stadium; Attendance: 1,006; Referee: Heber Estrada

=== Big Ten Tournament ===
November 4 QF	#3 Michigan	3-1	#6 Penn State	Ann Arbor, Michigan
1:00 p.m. EDT	Umar Farouk Osman 28'; Umar Farouk Osman 52'; Jack Hallahan 80'	Report	42' Ryan Gallagher	Stadium: U-M Soccer Stadium; Attendance: 1094; Referee: Nicholas Balcer; Assistant referees: Khalaf Al-Latayfeh; Dimitrios Katsimingo; Fourth official: Michael Allie

November 9 SF	#2 Wisconsin	0-1	#3 Michigan	Westfield, Indiana
3:30 p.m. EDT		Report	20' Marc Ybarra	Stadium: Grand Park; Attendance: 360; Referee: Sergio Gonzalez; Assistant referees: Ethan Buege; Landon Albert; Fourth official: Josh Kelley

November 11 F	#3 Michigan	0-3	#1 Indiana	Westfield, Indiana
12:00 p.m. EDT		Report	Cory Thomas 6'; Jeremiah Gutjahr 72'; Spencer Glass 74'	Stadium: Grand Park; Attendance: 1700; Referee: Hilario Grajeda; Assistant referees: Eulogio Vilalpando; Anthony Vasoli; Fourth official: Michael Allie

=== NCAA Tournament ===
November 15 First round	Michigan	1–1 (a.e.t.) (11–10 p)	Princeton	Ann Arbor, Michigan
7:00 PM EST	Kleedtke 75'	Report	Martin 39'	Stadium: U-M Soccer Stadium; Attendance: 474; Referee: Calin Radosav
	Penalties
	Ybarra (penalty missed); Zakyi (penalty scored); Brown (penalty scored); Hallahan (penalty missed); Mertz (penalty scored); Osman (penalty scored); Ragen (penalty scored); Kleedtke (penalty scored); Buca (penalty scored); Rosendall (penalty scored); Ybarra (penalty scored); Zakyi (penalty missed); Brown (penalty scored); Ragen (penalty scored)		(penalty scored) O'Toole; (penalty missed) Prudil; (penalty scored) Morokhovich; (penalty scored) Hampton; (penalty missed) McSherry; (penalty scored) Paniagua; (penalty scored) Belghiti; (penalty scored) Roberts; (penalty scored) Wusu; (penalty scored) Wolf; (penalty scored) O'Toole; (penalty missed) Prudil; (penalty scored) Morokhovich; (penalty missed) Hampton

November 18 Second round	No. 7 Notre Dame	0–0 (a.e.t.) (11–10 p)	Michigan	South Bend, Indiana
5:00 PM EST	Omar (yellow card) 80'	Report		Stadium: Alumni Stadium; Attendance: 363; Referee: Heber Estrada
	Penalties
	Berneski (penalty scored); MacLeod (penalty scored); Dumas (penalty scored); Dedrick (penalty scored); McCabe (penalty scored); Aschieris (penalty missed); Casey (penalty scored); Farina (penalty scored); McFadden (penalty scored); Townes (penalty scored); MacLeod (penalty scored); Dumas (penalty scored)		(penalty scored) Brown; (penalty scored) Ybarra; (penalty scored) Ragen; (penalty scored) Zakyi; (penalty scored) Mertz; (penalty missed) Osman; (penalty scored) Swiech; (penalty scored) Buca; (penalty scored) Kleedtke; (penalty scored) Rosendall; (penalty scored) Brown; (penalty missed) Ybarra

== See also ==
- 2018 Big Ten Conference men's soccer season
- 2018 Big Ten Conference Men's Soccer Tournament
- 2018 NCAA Division I men's soccer season
- 2018 NCAA Division I Men's Soccer Championship
