= 2018 Maryland Terrapins men's soccer team =

American college soccer season

2018 Maryland Terrapins men's soccer

NCAA Tournament National Champions
- Conference: Big Ten Conference
- U. Soc. Coaches poll: No. 15
- TopDrawerSoccer.com: No. 6
- Record: 11–6–4 (4–4–0 Big Ten)
- Head coach: Sasho Cirovski (26th season)
- Assistant coaches: Scott Buete (5th season); Jake Pace (1st season)
- Captains: Amar Sejdic; Andrew Samuels
- Home stadium: Ludwig Field

2018 Big Ten Conference men's soccer standings
	Conf.					Overall
Team	W		L		T	W		L		T
No. 3 Indiana ‡	8	–	0	–	0	20	–	3	–	1
Wisconsin	6	–	2	–	0	10	–	6	–	2
No. 4 Michigan State +	4	–	2	–	2	14	–	5	–	4
No. 24 Michigan +	4	–	2	–	2	12	–	5	–	4
No. 1 Maryland +	4	–	4	–	0	12	–	6	–	4
Penn State	3	–	3	–	2	6	–	9	–	2
Rutgers	2	–	6	–	0	4	–	13	–	1
Northwestern	0	–	5	–	3	6	–	9	–	5
Ohio State	0	–	7	–	1	1	–	15	–	2
$ – Conference champion; As of December 11, 2018; Rankings from United Soccer Coaches Poll; Source:The Big Ten Conference

The 2018 Maryland Terrapins men's soccer team represented the University of Maryland, College Park during the 2018 NCAA Division I men's soccer season. It was the 73rd season of the university fielding a program. The Terrapins were led by 26th year head coach, Sasho Cirovski.

Despite a relatively poor regular season performance in Big Ten play, a strong RPI allowed the Terps to earn an at-large berth as the 11th seed in the NCAA Tournament. In the tournament, the Terps went on their 14th ever College Cup run.

== Background ==
Ahead of the 2018 season, seven year assistant coach, Brian Rowland, left Maryland to take the head coaching position at Temple.

== Player movement ==
=== Departures ===
Name	Number	Pos.	Height	Weight	Year	Hometown	Reason for departure
Gordon Wild	8	FW	5'10"	170	Junior	Cologne, Germany	Declared for MLS SuperDraft. Selected 37th overall by Atlanta United.

== Squad information ==
=== Roster ===
As of August 16, 2018

Note: Flags indicate national team as defined under FIFA eligibility rules; some limited exceptions apply. Players may hold more than one non-FIFA nationality.

No.	Pos.	Nation	Player
0	GK	USA	Craig Eichelberger
1	GK	USA	Russell Shealy
2	DF	USA	Donovan Pines
4	MF	USA	Paul Frendach
5	DF	GER	Johannes Bergmann
6	MF	SVK	Richard Bedats
7	FW	USA	Justin Gielen
8	MF	FRA	William James Herve
9	FW	USA	Sebastian Elney
10	MF	BIH	Amar Sejdič
11	MF	USA	D.J. Reeves
12	DF	USA	Brett St. Martin
13	MF	USA	Andrew Samuels
14	MF	JAM	Luca Levee

No.	Pos.	Nation	Player
15	FW	USA	Eric Matzelevich
18	MF	KOR	Paul Bin
19	FW	USA	Brayan Padilla
20	MF	USA	Eli Crognale
21	FW	FRA	Vinicius Lansade
22	DF	USA	Nick Richardson
24	MF	USA	Mike Heitzmann
25	DF	USA	Ben Di Rosa
27	MF	USA	Matt Di Rosa
28	DF	USA	Chase Gasper
29	FW	USA	Fola Adetola
30	GK	VEN	Alejandro Chacon
31	MF	USA	Connor Smith
99	GK	CAN	Dayne St. Clair

=== Coaching staff ===
Front office
Athletic Director	Damon Evans
Deputy Athletic Director	Colleen Sorem
Chief Development Officer	Cheryl Harrison
Assistant Director	Kayley McInerney
Business Operations	Eric Reinke
Coaching staff
Head coach	Sasho Cirovski
Assistant coach	Scott Buete
Assistant coach	Jake Pace
Director of Operations	Miles Vaughn

Last updated: December 1, 2018
Source: UMTerps.com

== Schedule ==
Date Time, TV	Rank^{#}	Opponent^{#}	Result	Record	Site (Attendance) City, State
Regular season
August 24*; 11:00 p.m., P12N		at No. 24 Washington	L 0–2	0–1–0	Husky Soccer Stadium (1,354); Seattle, WA
August 31*; 6:00 p.m., FS1		No. 10 Stanford	T 0–0 ^{2OT}	0–1–1	Ludwig Field (5,802); College Park, MD
September 3*; 7:00 p.m.		vs. No. 7 Virginia; Tydings Cup	T 0–0 ^{2OT}	0–1–2	Audi Field (3,527); Washington, DC
September 8*; 7:00 p.m., BTN		UCLA	L 0–1	0–2–2	Ludwig Field (2,973); College Park, MD
September 10*; 7:00 p.m., BTN+		West Virginia	W 1–0	1–2–2	Ludwig Field (1,195); College Park, MD
September 14; 8:00 p.m., BTN+		at Northwestern	W 2–1	2–2–2 (1–0–0)	Martin Stadium (791); Evanston, IL
September 21; 7:00 p.m., BTN		Wisconsin	L 1–2	2–3–2 (1–1–0)	Ludwig Field (5,875); College Park, MD
September 26; 12:00 p.m., BTN+		at Rutgers	W 2–0	3–3–2 (2–1–0)	Yurcak Field (109); Piscataway, NJ
September 30*; 1:00 p.m.		at No. 18 Coastal Carolina	W 3–1	4–3–2	CCU Soccer Field (70); Conway, SC
October 5; 7:00 p.m., BTN		No. 13 Michigan State	L 0–2	4–4–2 (2–2–0)	Ludwig Field (3,145); College Park, MD
October 8*; 3:00 p.m.		at Georgetown	T 0–0 ^{2OT}	4–4–3	Shaw Field (1,493); Washington, DC
October 12; 7:30 p.m., BTN+		at No. 4 Indiana	L 1–2	4–5–3 (2–3–0)	Bill Armstrong Stadium (1,856); Bloomington, IN
October 16*; 7:00 p.m., BTN+		No. 7 Denver	W 1–0	5–5–3	Ludwig Field (1,115); College Park, MD
October 19; 7:00 p.m., BTN+		Ohio State	W 5–0	6–5–3 (3–3–0)	Ludwig Field (3,107); College Park, MD
October 23; 6:00 p.m., BTN		Penn State	W 3–2 ^{2OT}	7–5–3 (4–3–0)	Ludwig Field (1,818); College Park, MD
October 28; 4:00 p.m., BTN	No. 25	at No. 24 Michigan	L 1–2 ^{OT}	7–6–3 (4–4–0)	U-M Soccer Stadium (1,006); Ann Arbor, MI
Big Ten Tournament
November 4; 1:00 p.m., BTN+	(5) No. 23	at (4) No. 17 Michigan State; Quarterfinals	W 1–0	8–6–3	DeMartin Stadium (638); East Lansing, MI
November 9; 1:00 p.m., BTN	(5) No. 23	vs. (1) No. 2 Indiana; Semifinals	T 1–1; L 3–4 (p) ^{2OT}	8–6–4	Grand Park (360); Westfield, IN
NCAA Tournament
November 18*; 1:00 p.m., BTN2Go	(11) No. 15	NC State; Second Round	W 2–0	9–6–4	Ludwig Field (1,266); College Park, MD
November 24*; 7:00 p.m., WatchESPN	(11) No. 15	at (6) No. 10 Duke; Sweet Sixteen	W 2–0	10–6–4	Koskinen Stadium (362); Durham, NC
November 30*; 6:05 p.m., SECN+	(11) No. 11	at (3) No. 3 Kentucky; Elite Eight	W 1–0	11–6–4	Bell Soccer Complex (3,228); Lexington, KY
December 7; 8:00 p.m., ESPNU	(11) No. 3	vs. (2) No. 1 Indiana; College Cup	W 2–0	12–6–4	Harder Stadium; Santa Barbara, CA
December 9; 1:00 p.m., ESPN2	(11) No. 3	vs. No. 4 Akron; National Championship	W 1–0	13–6–4	Harder Stadium; Santa Barbara, CA
*Non-conference game. ^{#}Rankings from United Soccer Coaches. (#) Tournament seedings in parentheses.

== Statistics ==
=== Appearances and goals ===
No.	Pos.	Player	Regular season			B1G Tournament			NCAA Tournament			Total		
No.	Pos.	Player	Apps	Goals	Asst.	Apps	Goals	Asst.	Apps	Goals	Asst.	Apps	Goals	Asst.
0	GK	(United States) Craig Eichelberger	0	0	0	0	0	0	0	0	0	0	0	0
1	GK	(United States) Russell Shealy	0	0	0	0	0	0	0	0	0	0	0	0
2	DF	(United States) Donovan Pines	16	1	1	1	0	0	3	0	1	20	1	2
4	MF	(Germany) Paul Frendach	15	0	0	0	0	0	0	0	0	15	0	0
5	DF	(Germany) Johannes Bergmann	16	0	1	2	0	0	3	0	0	21	0	1
6	MF	(Slovakia) Richard Bedats	5	0	0	0	0	0	0	0	0	5	0	0
7	FW	(United States) Justin Gielen	15	1	2	2	0	0	1	0	0	18	1	2
8	MF	(France) William Herve	13	3	2	2	0	1	3	1	0	17	3	3
9	FW	(United States) Sebastian Elney	14	2	2	2	0	0	3	2	0	19	4	2
10	MF	(Bosnia and Herzegovina) Amar Sejdic	16	5	0	2	0	0	3	2	1	21	7	1
11	DF	(United States) D.J. Reeves	16	0	0	2	0	0	3	0	0	21	0	0
12	DF	(United States) Brett St. Martin	11	1	0	1	0	0	0	0	0	12	1	0
13	MF	(United States) Andrew Samuels	16	0	1	2	0	0	3	0	0	21	0	1
14	MF	(Jamaica) Luca Levee	6	0	0	0	0	0	0	0	0	6	0	0
15	FW	(United States) Eric Matzelevich	16	1	3	2	1	0	3	0	0	21	2	3
18	MF	(South Korea) Paul Bin	15	4	2	2	0	0	3	0	1	19	4	3
19	FW	(Mexico) Brayan Padilla	5	0	1	1	0	0	0	0	0	6	0	1
20	MF	(United States) Eli Crognale	15	0	1	2	0	0	3	0	1	20	0	2
21	FW	(France) Vinicius Lansade	13	1	0	2	0	1	1	0	0	16	1	1
22	DF	(United States) Nick Richardson	0	0	0	0	0	0	0	0	0	0	0	0
24	MF	(United States) Mike Heitzmann	4	1	0	1	0	0	0	0	0	5	1	0
25	DF	(United States) Ben Di Rosa	5	0	0	2	1	0	3	0	0	10	1	0
27	MF	(United States) Matt Di Rosa	12	0	1	2	0	0	3	0	0	17	0	1
28	DF	(United States) Chase Gasper	9	0	5	1	0	0	3	0	0	13	0	5
29	FW	(Nigeria) Fola Adetola	0	0	0	0	0	0	0	0	0	0	0	0
30	GK	(Venezuela) Alejandro Chacon	0	0	0	0	0	0	0	0	0	0	0	0
31	MF	(United States) Connor Smith	0	0	0	0	0	0	0	0	0	0	0	0
99	GK	(Canada) Dayne St. Clair	16	0	0	2	0	0	3	0	0	21	0	0

=== Discipline ===
No.	Pos.	Player	Regular Season			B1G Tournament			NCAA Tournament			Total		
No.	Pos.	Player	Booked	(yellow card) (yellow-red card)	Sent off (straight red)	Booked	(yellow card) (yellow-red card)	Sent off (straight red)	Booked	(yellow card) (yellow-red card)	Sent off (straight red)	Booked	(yellow card) (yellow-red card)	Sent off (straight red)
0	GK	(United States) Craig Eichelberger	0	0	0	0	0	0	0	0	0	0	0	0
1	GK	(United States) Russell Shealy	0	0	0	0	0	0	0	0	0	0	0	0
2	DF	(United States) Donovan Pines	0	0	0	0	0	0	0	0	0	0	0	0
4	MF	(Germany) Paul Frendach	0	0	0	0	0	0	0	0	0	0	0	0
5	DF	(Germany) Johannes Bergmann	0	0	0	0	0	0	0	0	0	0	0	0
6	MF	(Slovakia) Richard Bedats	0	0	0	0	0	0	0	0	0	0	0	0
7	FW	(United States) Justin Gielen	0	0	0	0	0	0	0	0	0	0	0	0
8	MF	(France) William Herve	0	0	0	0	0	0	0	0	0	0	0	0
9	FW	(United States) Sebastian Elney	0	0	0	0	0	0	0	0	0	0	0	0
10	MF	(Bosnia and Herzegovina) Amar Sejdic	0	0	0	0	0	0	0	0	0	0	0	0
11	DF	(United States) D.J. Reeves	0	0	0	0	0	0	0	0	0	0	0	0
12	DF	(United States) Brett St. Martin	0	0	0	0	0	0	0	0	0	0	0	0
13	MF	(United States) Andrew Samuels	0	0	0	0	0	0	0	0	0	0	0	0
14	MF	(Jamaica) Luca Levee	0	0	0	0	0	0	0	0	0	0	0	0
15	FW	(United States) Eric Matzelevich	0	0	0	0	0	0	0	0	0	0	0	0
18	MF	(South Korea) Paul Bin	0	0	0	0	0	0	0	0	0	0	0	0
19	FW	(Mexico) Brayan Padilla	0	0	0	0	0	0	0	0	0	0	0	0
20	MF	(United States) Eli Crognale	0	0	0	0	0	0	0	0	0	0	0	0
21	FW	(France) Vinicius Lansade	0	0	0	0	0	0	0	0	0	0	0	0
22	DF	(United States) Nick Richardson	0	0	0	0	0	0	0	0	0	0	0	0
24	MF	(United States) Mike Heitzmann	0	0	0	0	0	0	0	0	0	0	0	0
25	DF	(United States) Ben Di Rosa	0	0	0	0	0	0	0	0	0	0	0	0
27	MF	(United States) Matt Di Rosa	0	0	0	0	0	0	0	0	0	0	0	0
28	DF	(United States) Chase Gasper	0	0	0	0	0	0	0	0	0	0	0	0
29	FW	(Nigeria) Fola Adetola	0	0	0	0	0	0	0	0	0	0	0	0
30	GK	(Venezuela) Alejandro Chacon	0	0	0	0	0	0	0	0	0	0	0	0
31	MF	(United States) Connor Smith	0	0	0	0	0	0	0	0	0	0	0	0
99	GK	(Canada) Dayne St. Clair	0	0	0	0	0	0	0	0	0	0	0	0

=== Summary ===
Competition	P	W	L	T	GF	GA	GD	PCT.	Pts.	Booked	(yellow card) (yellow-red card)	Sent off (straight red)
Regular Season	16	7	6	3	20	15	+5	.531	24	19	0	1
Big Ten Tournament	2	1	0	1	2	1	+1	.750	4	1	0	0
NCAA Tournament	4	4	0	0	7	0	+5	1.000	11	4	0	0
Total	22	12	6	4	29	16	+11	.619	40	24	0	1

== Awards ==
No.	Pos.	Player	Award	Source

== See also ==
- 2018 Maryland Terrapins women's soccer team
