= 2018 Big Ten men's soccer tournament =

- Classification: Division I
- Teams: 9
- Matches: 8
- First round site: Top Seed Campus Site
- Quarterfinals site: Higher seeds
- Semifinals site: Grand Park; Westfield, Indiana
- Finals site: Grand Park; Westfield, Indiana
- Champions: Indiana (13th title)
- Winning coach: Todd Yeagley (2nd title)
- MVP: Cory Thomas and Andrew Gutman (Indiana)
- Broadcast: BTN

2018 Big Ten Conference men's soccer standings
	Conf.					Overall
Team	W		L		T	W		L		T
No. 3 Indiana ‡	8	–	0	–	0	20	–	3	–	1
Wisconsin	6	–	2	–	0	10	–	6	–	2
No. 4 Michigan State +	4	–	2	–	2	14	–	5	–	4
No. 24 Michigan +	4	–	2	–	2	12	–	5	–	4
No. 1 Maryland +	4	–	4	–	0	12	–	6	–	4
Penn State	3	–	3	–	2	6	–	9	–	2
Rutgers	2	–	6	–	0	4	–	13	–	1
Northwestern	0	–	5	–	3	6	–	9	–	5
Ohio State	0	–	7	–	1	1	–	15	–	2
$ – Conference champion; As of December 11, 2018; Rankings from United Soccer Coaches Poll; Source:The Big Ten Conference

The 2018 Big Ten Conference men's soccer tournament is the 28th edition of the tournament. It determined the Big Ten Conference's automatic berth into the 2018 NCAA Division I Men's Soccer Championship. Wisconsin enters the tournament as the defending champions. The Number 1 Seeded Indiana beat the number 3 seeded Michigan in the Big Ten Tournament Championship Game 3 to 0. Indiana won its 13th Big Ten Tournament title.

== Seeds ==
All nine Big Ten schools participated in the tournament. Teams were seeded by conference record, with a tiebreaker system used to seed teams with identical conference records. The top 10 teams received a first round bye and the top four teams received a double bye. Tiebreaking procedures remained unchanged from the 2016 Tournament.

Seed	School	Conference record							
Seed	School	Pld.	W	L	T	GF	GA	GD	Pts.
1	Indiana	8	8	0	0	13	3	+10	24
2	Wisconsin	8	6	2	0	12	8	+4	18
3	Michigan	8	4	2	2	11	6	+5	14
4	Michigan State	8	4	2	2	8	5	+3	14
5	Maryland	8	4	4	0	15	11	+4	12
6	Penn State	8	3	3	2	9	8	+1	11
7	Rutgers	8	2	6	0	8	16	-8	6
8	Northwestern	8	0	5	3	4	10	-6	3
9	Ohio State	8	0	7	1	5	18	-13	1

== Bracket ==
First Round; November 3
8	Northwestern	3
9	Ohio State	1

Quarterfinals; November 4
1	Indiana	2^{OT}
8	Northwestern	1
4	Michigan State	0
5	Maryland	1^{OT}
3	Michigan	3
6	Penn State	1
2	Wisconsin	6
7	Rutgers	3

Semifinals; November 9
1	Indiana (pen.)	1 (4)
5	Maryland	1 (3)
3	Michigan	1
2	Wisconsin	0

Championship; November 11
1	Indiana	3
3	Michigan	0

== Schedule ==
=== First round ===
November 3, 2018	#8 Northwestern	3–1	#9 Ohio State	Bloomington, Indiana
1:00 p.m. EDT	Sean Lynch 20'; Camden Buescher 77'; Matt Moderwell 87'	Report	16' Jake Scheper	Stadium: Bill Armstrong Stadium; Attendance: 312; Referee: Nikola Aleksic; Assistant referees: Christian Little; Jacob Little; Fourth official: Nabil Bensalah

=== Quarterfinals ===
November 4, 2018	#1 Indiana	2–1 (a.e.t.)	#8 Northwestern	Bloomington, Indiana
4:00 p.m. EDT	Rece Buckmaster 79'; Spencer Glass 96'	Report	88' Matt Moderwell	Stadium: Bill Armstrong Stadium; Attendance: 1005; Referee: Mark Kadlecik; Assistant referees: Anthony Vasoli; Sean West; Fourth official: Youssef Elmessoussi

November 4, 2018	#4 Michigan State	0–1 (a.e.t.)	#5 Maryland	East Lansing, Michigan
1:00 p.m. EDT		Report	97' Eric Matzelevich	Stadium: DeMartin Soccer Complex; Attendance: 638; Referee: Carmen Serbio; Assistant referees: Andrew Bigelow; Eulogio Villalpando; Fourth official: John Douglas

November 4, 2018	#3 Michigan	3–1	#6 Penn State	Ann Arbor, Michigan
1:00 p.m. EDT	Umar Farouk Osman 28'; Umar Farouk Osman 52'; Jack Hallahan 80'	Report	42' Ryan Gallagher	Stadium: U-M Soccer Stadium; Attendance: 1094; Referee: Nicholas Balcer; Assistant referees: Khalaf Al-Latayfeh; Dimitrios Katsimingo; Fourth official: Michael Allie

November 3, 2018	#2 Wisconsin	6–3	#7 Rutgers	Madison, Wisconsin
1:00 p.m. EDT	Noah Leibold 30'; Patrick Yim 43'; Isaac Schlenker 49'; Noah Melick 69'; Noah Melick 76'; Alex Alfaro 82'	Report	10' Brandon Golden; 13' Miles Hackett; 37' Jordan Hall	Stadium: Dan McClimon Memorial Track/Soccer Complex; Attendance: 219; Referee: Dimitar Chavdarov; Assistant referees: Heber Estrada; Eulogio Villalpando; Fourth official: Jorge Cuate

=== Semifinals ===
November 9, 2018	#5 Maryland	1–1 (a.e.t.) (3–4 p)	#1 Indiana	Westfield, Indiana
1:00 p.m. EDT	Ben Di Rosa 71'	Report	60' Andrew Gutman	Stadium: Grand Park; Attendance: 360; Referee: Calin Radosav; Assistant referees: Nikola Aleksic; Michael Allie; Fourth official: Josh Kelley
	Penalties
	Amar Sejdic (penalty scored); Chase Gasper (penalty scored); Mike Heitzmann (penalty missed); Vinicius Lansade (penalty missed); Johannes Bergmann (penalty scored)		(penalty scored) Francesco Moore; (penalty missed) Rece Buckmaster; (penalty scored) Austin Panchot; (penalty scored) Jeremiah Gutjahr; (penalty scored) Cory Thomas

November 9, 2018	#2 Wisconsin	0–1	#3 Michigan	Westfield, Indiana
3:30 p.m. EDT		Report	20' Marc Ybarra	Stadium: Grand Park; Attendance: 360; Referee: Sergio Gonzalez; Assistant referees: Ethan Buege; Landon Albert; Fourth official: Josh Kelley

=== Final ===
November 11, 2018	#3 Michigan	0–3	#1 Indiana	Westfield, Indiana
12:00 p.m. EDT		Report	Cory Thomas 6'; Jeremiah Gutjahr 72'; Spencer Glass 74'	Stadium: Grand Park; Attendance: 1700; Referee: Hilario Grajeda; Assistant referees: Eulogio Vilalpando; Anthony Vasoli; Fourth official: Michael Allie

== Top goalscorers ==
2 goals

- Spencer Glass - Indiana
- Noah Melick - Wisconsin
- Matt Moderwell - Northwestern
- Umar Farouk Osman - Michigan

1 goal

- Alex Alfaro - Wisconsin
- Rece Buckmaster - Indiana
- Camden Buescher - Northwestern
- Ben Di Rosa - Maryland
- Ryan Gallagher - Penn State
- Brandon Golden - Rutgers
- Jeremaih Gutjahr - Indiana
- Andrew Gutman - Indiana
- Miles Hackett - Rutgers
- Jordan Hall - Rutgers
- Jack Hallahan - Michigan
- Noah Leibold - Wisconsin
- Sean Lynch - Northwestern
- Eric Matzelevich - Maryland
- Jake Scheper - Ohio State
- Isaac Schlenker - Wisconsin
- Cory Thomas - Indiana
- Marc Ybarra - Michigan
- Patrick Yim - Wisconsin

== All-Tournament team ==
- Andrew Gutman, Indiana - Defensive Player of the Tournament
- Francesco Moore, Indiana
- Cory Thomas, Indiana - Offensive Player of the Tournament
- Amar Sejdic, Maryland
- Robbie Mertz, Michigan
- Jackson Ragen, Michigan
- Connor Corrigan, Michigan State
- Matt Moderwell, Northwestern
- Ryan Gallagher, Penn State
- Jordan Hall, Rutgers
- Isaac Schlenker, Wisconsin

== See also ==
- Big Ten Conference Men's Soccer Tournament
- 2018 Big Ten Conference men's soccer season
- 2018 NCAA Division I Men's Soccer Championship
- 2018 NCAA Division I men's soccer season
- 2017 Big Ten Conference Men's Soccer Tournament
