= 2018 Michigan State Spartans men's soccer team =

American college men's soccer season

2018 Michigan State Spartans men's soccer

NCAA Tournament, College Cup
- Conference: Big Ten Conference
- U. Soc. Coaches poll: No. 4
- TopDrawerSoccer.com: No. 4
- Record: 14–5–4 (4–2–2 Big Ten)
- Head coach: Damon Rensing (10th season)
- Assistant coaches: Cale Wassermann (5th season); Ben Pirmann (8th season); Micah Collins (1st season)
- Home stadium: DeMartin Stadium

2018 Big Ten Conference men's soccer standings
	Conf.					Overall
Team	W		L		T	W		L		T
No. 3 Indiana ‡	8	–	0	–	0	20	–	3	–	1
Wisconsin	6	–	2	–	0	10	–	6	–	2
No. 4 Michigan State +	4	–	2	–	2	14	–	5	–	4
No. 24 Michigan +	4	–	2	–	2	12	–	5	–	4
No. 1 Maryland +	4	–	4	–	0	12	–	6	–	4
Penn State	3	–	3	–	2	6	–	9	–	2
Rutgers	2	–	6	–	0	4	–	13	–	1
Northwestern	0	–	5	–	3	6	–	9	–	5
Ohio State	0	–	7	–	1	1	–	15	–	2
$ – Conference champion; As of December 11, 2018; Rankings from United Soccer Coaches Poll; Source:The Big Ten Conference

The 2018 Michigan State Spartans men's soccer team represented Michigan State University during the 2018 NCAA Division I men's soccer season. The program was coached by 10th year head coach, Damon Rensing. It was the 63rd season the university fielded a men's varsity soccer team, and their 28th season in the Big Ten Conference.

The season was highlighted by Michigan State reaching the College Cup (final four) of the NCAA Division I Men's Soccer Tournament, a feat they had not accomplished since 1968. There, making their first appearance in half a century, they lost to eventual national-runners up, Akron, 5–1.

Three players from this team were drafted in the 2019 MLS SuperDraft: DeJuan Jones, Ryan Sierakowski, and Jimmy Hague.

== Roster ==
The following players were part of the 2018 Michigan State men's soccer team.

Note: Flags indicate national team as defined under FIFA eligibility rules; some limited exceptions apply. Players may hold more than one non-FIFA nationality.

No.	Pos.	Nation	Player
1	GK	USA	Jimmy Hague
2	MF	USA	Jack Beck
3	DF	DEN	Patrick Nielsen
4	DF	USA	Nick Woodruff
5	MF	USA	Michael Pimlott
6	FW	USA	DeJuan Jones
7	FW	USA	Hunter Barone
8	MF	USA	Alex Shterenberg
9	FW	KEN	Farai Mutatu
10	MF	USA	Giuseppe Barone
11	FW	USA	Ryan Sierakowski
13	FW	USA	Robbie Cort
14	DF	NGA	Olu Ogunwale

No.	Pos.	Nation	Player
15	MF	USA	Colton Stanley
16	DF	USA	Connor Corrigan
17	DF	KEN	Michael Wetungu
18	MF	USA	Michael Miller
20	MF	USA	Cody Sweatte
21	FW	SUI	Julian Ajroja
25	MF	USA	
26	MF	USA	
27	FW	USA	Connor Wineman
28	MF	USA	
34	MF	USA	
35	MF	USA	
36	MF	USA	

== Schedule ==
Date Time, TV	Rank^{#}	Opponent^{#}	Result	Record	Team events	Opponent events	Site City, State
Preseason
August 10*; 2:00 pm	No. 7	Spring Arbor	W 2–0				DeMartin Stadium; East Lansing, MI
August 13*; 1:00 pm	No. 7	No. 14 Western Michigan	T 1–1				DeMartin Stadium; East Lansing, MI
August 17*; 6:00 pm	No. 7	vs. Xavier	T 0–0				Hefner Soccer Complex; Fort Wayne, IN
Non-conference regular season
August 24*; 7:00 pm	No. 7	South Florida	W 1–0	1–0–0	Mutatu 87'	Flangan (yellow card) 43'; Ycaza (yellow card) 71'	DeMartin Stadium (2,048); East Lansing, MI
August 26*; 1:00 pm	No. 7	Tulsa	T 0–0 ^{2OT}	1–0–1	G. Barone (yellow card) 84'; Pimlott (yellow card) 110'	Partain (yellow card) 79'; Vargas (yellow card) 96'; Gerteisen (yellow card) 106'	DeMartin Stadium (652); East Lansing, MI
August 31*; 3:00 pm	No. 5	Canisius	W 3–2	2–0–1	Jones 7'; Woodruff 40'; H. Barone 59'; Freitag (yellow card) 90'	Cavazzoli (yellow card) 40'; Walsh (yellow card) 42'; Tamburini 76'; Preci 80'	DeMartin Stadium (460); East Lansing, MI
September 3*; 1:00 pm	No. 5	UC Riverside	W 5–1	3–0–1	Sierakowski 21'; H. Barone 58'; Cort 65'; Freitag 66'; G. Barone (yellow card) 72'; Beck 81'	Sanchez (yellow card) 54'; Benito (yellow card) 77'; Aguirre 86'	DeMartin Stadium (611); East Lansing, MI
September 7*; 7:00 pm	No. 3	at Bowling Green	W 3–0	4–0–1	Sierakowski 53'; Jones 81', 88'		Cochrane Stadium (826); Bowling Green, OH
September 10*; 7:00 pm, BTN+	No. 3	Oakland	W 4–2	5–0–1			DeMartin Stadium (1,106); East Lansing, MI
September 14*; 7:00 pm, ESPN+	No. 4	at Yale	T 2–2 ^{2OT}	5–0–2			Reese Stadium (1,014); New Haven, CT
September 17*; 7:00 pm, BTN+	No. 4	at No. 8 Notre Dame; Rivalry	W 1–0	6–0–2			Alumni Stadium (718); South Bend, IN
Big Ten regular season
September 21; 7:00 pm, BTN+	No. 5	Rutgers	W 2–1	7–0–2 (1–0–0)			DeMartin Stadium (1,303); East Lansing, MI
September 26; 6:00 pm, BTN+	No. 5	at Penn State	W 2–1	8–0–2 (2–0–0)			Jeffrey Field (552); State College, PA
September 30; 2:00 pm, BTN	No. 5	Wisconsin	L 0–1 ^{OT}	8–1–2 (2–1–0)			DeMartin Stadium (1,028); East Lansing, MI
October 5; 7:00 pm, BTN	No. 5	at Maryland	W 2–0	9–1–2 (3–1–0)			Ludwig Field (3,145); College Park, MD
October 9*; 7:05 pm, BTN	No. 8	No. 19 Akron	L 1–2	9–2–2			DeMartin Stadium (1,017); East Lansing, MI
October 12; 7:00 pm	No. 13	at Ohio State	W 2–1	10–2–2 (4–1–0)			Jesse Owens Stadium (543); Columbus, OH
October 19; 7:05 pm, BTN	No. 13	Northwestern	T 0–0 ^{2OT}	10–2–3 (4–1–1)			DeMartin Stadium (1,508); East Lansing, MI
October 23; 8:00 pm, BTN	No. 12	No. 18 Michigan; Big Bear Trophy	T 1–1 ^{2OT}	10–2–4 (4–1–2)			DeMartin Stadium (2,139); East Lansing, MI
October 28; 4:05 pm, ESPNU	No. 12	at No. 2 Indiana	L 0–1 ^{OT}	10–3–4 (4–2–2)			Bill Armstrong Stadium (2,454); Bloomington, IN
Big Ten Tournament
November 4; 1:05 pm, BTN+	(4) No. 17	(5) No. 23 Maryland	L 0–1 ^{OT}	10–4–4			DeMartin Stadium (638); East Lansing, MI
NCAA Tournament
November 15*; 7:00 pm, ESPN3	No. 25	UIC; First round	W 2–0	11–4–4			DeMartin Stadium (332); East Lansing, MI
November 18*; 5:00 pm, ACCN	No. 25	at (4) No. 4 Louisville; Second round	W 2–1 ^{OT}	12–4–4			Lynn Stadium (1,491); Louisville, KY
November 25*; 1:00 pm	No. 7	at (13) No. 13 Georgetown; Sweet Sixteen	W 1–0	13–4–4			Cooper Field (1,855); Washington, DC
December 1*; 5:00 pm	No. 7	No. 8 James Madison; Elite Eight	W 2–1	14–4–4			DeMartin Stadium (1,758); East Lansing, MI
December 7*; 8:00 pm, ESPNU	No. 4	vs. No. 2 Akron; College Cup	L 1–5	14–5–4			Harder Stadium (1,758); Santa Barbara, CA
*Non-conference game. ^{#}Rankings from United Soccer Coaches. (#) Tournament seedings in parentheses. All times are in Eastern Time.

== Honors ==
Date	Player	Honor	Ref.
August 28	Jimmy Hague	Big Ten Defensive Player of the Week	
September 11	DeJuan Jones	Big Ten Player of the Week	
September 25	Ryan Sierakowski	Big Ten Player of the Week	
October 9	Patrick Nielsen	Big Ten Defensive Player of the Week	
November 2	Giuseppe Barone	Big Ten Midfielder of the Year	
November 2	Giuseppe Barone	All-Big Ten First Team	
November 2	Giuseppe Barone	All-Big Ten First Team	
November 2	Patrick Nielsen	All-Big Ten First Team	
November 2	DeJuan Jones	All-Big Ten Second Team	
November 2	Jimmy Hague	All-Big Ten Second Team	
November 2	Ryan Sierakowski	All-Big Ten Second Team	
November 2	Jack Beck	All-Big Ten Rookie Team	
November 2	Farai Mutatu	All-Big Ten Rookie Team	
November 2	Connor Corrigan	Big Ten Sportsmanship Award	
November 11	Connor Corrigan	All-Big Ten Tournament Team	

== Players selected in the 2019 MLS Draft ==
Player	Position	Round	Pick	Club	Ref.
DeJuan Jones	MF	1	11	New England Revolution	
Ryan Sierakowski	FW	1	23	Portland Timbers	
Jimmy Hague	GK	2	30	FC Cincinnati	

== See also ==
- 2018 Big Ten Conference Men's Soccer Tournament
- 2018 NCAA Division I Men's Soccer Tournament
