= 2018 Akron Zips men's soccer team =

American college soccer season

2018 Akron Zips men's soccer

MAC Tournament Champions

NCAA Tournament, Runners-Up
- Conference: Mid-American Conference
- U. Soc. Coaches poll: No. 2
- TopDrawerSoccer.com: No. 2
- Record: 15–7–2 (1–2–1 MAC)
- Head coach: Jared Embick (6th season)
- Assistant coaches: Leo Chappel (4th season); Ger Coppinger (4th season); T.J. Kolba (4th season)
- Home stadium: FirstEnergy Stadium–Cub Cadet Field

2018 Mid-American Conference men's soccer standings
	Conf.					Overall
Team	W		L		T	W		L		T
No. 22 West Virginia +	5	–	0	–	0	14	–	7	–	0
Bowling Green	2	–	1	–	2	6	–	7	–	4
Western Michigan	1	–	1	–	2	11	–	6	–	3
No. 2 Akron ‡	1	–	2	–	1	15	–	7	–	2
SIU Edwardsville	1	–	3	–	1	9	–	5	–	4
Northern Illinois	1	–	4	–	0	8	–	9	–	1
‡ – 2018 MAC Tournament champion + – Invited to the 2018 NCAA Division I Men's Soccer Championship; As of December 11, 2018; Rankings from United Soccer Coaches

The 2018 Akron Zips men's soccer team represented The University of Akron during the 2018 NCAA Division I men's soccer season. The Zips, played in the Mid-American Conference.

== Player movement ==
=== Departures ===
A program record of 19 players departed the program following the 2017 season. Most players either graduated or declared for the MLS SuperDraft while others transferred to local NCAA Division II soccer programs.

Name	Number	Pos.	Height	Weight	Year	Hometown	Reason for departure
João Moutinho	2	DF	6'1"	170	Freshman	Lisbon, POR	Declared for MLS SuperDraft. Selected 1st overall by Los Angeles FC. Signed with club.
Nick Hinds	3	DF	5'8"	150	Sophomore	Plantation, FL	Signed with Seattle Sounders FC 2
Niko de Vera	4	DF	5'5"	140	Senior	Camas, WA	Declared for MLS SuperDraft. Selected 28th overall by New York Red Bulls. Signed with New York Red Bulls II.
Marc Alexander	5	DF	6'0"	180	Freshman	Pittsburgh, PA	Transferred to Hartford.
Sam Gainford	7	FW	6'1"	168	RS Senior	Whitehaven, ENG	Graduated.
Stuart Holthusen	9	FW	6'1"	151	Senior	Auckland, NZL	Declared for MLS SuperDraft. Selected 64th overall by Portland Timbers. Did not sign with club.
Manuel Cordeiro	10	MF	5'9"	153	RS Senior	Porto, POR	Graduated
Reggie Laryea	12	MF	5'11"	151	Sophomore	Toronto, ON	Left the program. Signed with Sigma FC
Pau Belana	13	MF	5'11"	162	RS Senior	Barcelona, ESP	Graduated
Shane Wiedt	16	DF	6'3"	180	RS Junior	Akron, OH	Transferred to Pittsburgh.
Nate Shultz	18	DF	6'0"	160	Senior	Mayfield, OH	Declared for MLS SuperDraft. Selected 48th overall by LA Galaxy. Signed with LA Galaxy II
Dener Dos Santos	19	MF	5'8"	154	RS Senior	Joinville, BRA	Graduated
Alex Mapp	20	DF	6'0"	175	RS Freshman	Medina, OH	Transferred to Ashland.
Jackson Crawford	22	DF	5'9"	164	RS Freshman	Massillon, OH	Transferred to Ashland.
Barth-Luther Mouafo	23	MF	6'0"	197	RS Senior	Douala, CMR	Graduated
Nick Costa	28	GK	6'0"	215	RS Sophomore	North Royalton, OH	Transferred to Ashland.
Codie Lynd	30	GK	5'9"	175	Freshman	Belleville, IL	Transferred to Maryville.
Nate Brown	31	DF	6'2"	162	Senior	Scarborough, ON	Graduated

=== Transfers ===
Name	Nat.	Height	Weight	Year	Hometown	Notes
Dennis Cole	SLE	5'7"	143	Sophomore	Freetown, SLE	Transferred from Sacramento State.
Abi Mohamed	SOM	5'11"	151	Senior	Westerville, OH	Transferred from Ohio State.
Daniel Oliveira	POR	5'7"	145	RS Freshman	Lisbon, POR	Transferred from Técnico.
Diogo Pacheco	POR	5'10"	160	RS Sophomore	Lisbon, POR	Transferred from Lusófona.
Leonard Sohn	CAN	5'10"	151	Junior	Richmond Hill, ON	Transferred from Manhattan.
Peter Zecca	USA	5'10"	162	Sophomore	Weston, MA	Transferred from St. John's.

=== Recruits ===
Name	Nat.	Hometown	Club	TDS Rating
Ahmed Allen	USA	Stafford, VA	Bethesda SC	2/5 stars
Dion Akhigbe	NGA	Copley, OH	OYSA North Challenger	2/5 stars
Colin Biros	USA	Canton, OH	Columbus Crew U-17	4/5 stars
Ricky Ceballos	MEX	Mexico City, MEX	UNAM U-20	1/5 stars
Pol Hernández	ESP	Teià, ESP	Espanyol U-18	3/5 stars
Nick McCausland	USA	New Franklin, OH	Cleveland Internationals	2/5 stars
Marco Milanese	ITA	Isernia, ITA	Napoli U-17	2/5 stars
Ivan Nikolić	SER	Toronto, ON	Sigma U-20	2/5 stars
Carlo Ritaccio	ITA	Westbury, NY	BW Gottschee	3/5 stars
Nick Sibila	GER	Munich, GER	Deisenhofen U-19	1/5 stars
Sam Tojaga	USA	Erie, PA	Real Salt Lake U-17	1/5 stars

== Squad information ==
=== Roster ===
Note: Flags indicate national team as defined under FIFA eligibility rules; some limited exceptions apply. Players may hold more than one non-FIFA nationality.

No.	Pos.	Nation	Player
1	GK	(Germany) GER	Ben Lundt
2	DF	(Spain) ESP	Pol Hernández
3	DF	(Italy) ITA	Carlo Ritaccio
4	DF	(Italy) ITA	Marco Milanese
5	DF	(Canada) CAN	Leonard Sohn
6	MF	(United States) USA	Skye Harter
7	FW	(Eritrea) ERI	Ezana Kahsay
8	DF	(United States) USA	Morgan Hackworth
9	FW	(Nigeria) NGA	David Egbo
10	MF	(Italy) ITA	Marco Micaletto
11	FW	(Canada) CAN	Marcel Zajac
12	FW	(United States) USA	Colin Biros
14	MF	(Portugal) POR	Diogo Pacheco
15	FW	(United States) USA	Braden Petno
16	MF	(United States) USA	Sam Tojaga
17	DF	(United States) USA	Joe Korb

No.	Pos.	Nation	Player
18	DF	(Serbia) SRB	Ivan Nikolić
19	MF	(Canada) CAN	Faisal Ghaffur
20	DF	(United States) USA	Ahmed Allen
21	MF	(United States) USA	Christian Lue Young
22	MF	(Sierra Leone) SLE	Dennis Cole
23	DF	(Portugal) POR	Daniel Oliveira
24	GK	(United States) USA	Tor Saunders
25	DF	(United States) USA	Daniel Strachan
26	MF	(Somalia) SOM	Abdi Mohamed
27	DF	(Republic of Ireland) IRL	Declan Watters
28	MF	(Nigeria) NGA	Dion Akhigbe
29	DF	(United States) USA	Nick McCausland
30	GK	(Germany) GER	Nick Sibila
31	GK	(Mexico) MEX	Ricky Ceballos
32	FW	(United States) USA	Peter Zecca

=== Coaching staff ===
Front office
Athletic Director	Larry Williams
Associate Athletic Director	Mary Lu Gribschaw
Associate Athletic Director	George Van Horne
Faculty Representative	Matthew Juravich
Senior Administrative Assistant	Kathy Rex
Coaching staff
Head coach	Jared Embick
Assistant coach	Leo Chappel
Goalkeepers coach	Ger Coppinger
Assistant coach	T.J. Kolba

Last updated: December 5, 2018
Source: GoZips.com

== Schedule ==
Date Time, TV	Rank^{#}	Opponent^{#}	Result	Record	Site City, State
Exhibition
August 11*; 7:00 p.m.	No. 2	No. 11 Denver	T 1–1		Cub Cadet Field (1,126); Akron, OH
August 13*; 7:00 p.m.	No. 2	Cleveland State	W 2–0		Cub Cadet Field (1,264); Akron, OH
August 17*; 7:00 p.m.	No. 2	vs. No. 2 Indiana	T 1–1		Bishop D'Arcy Stadium (3,193); Fort Wayne, IN
Regular Season
August 24*; 7:00 p.m., ESPN3	No. 2	No. 9 Butler	T 2–2 ^{2OT}	0–0–1	Cub Cadet Field (2,579); Akron, OH
August 27*; 7:00 p.m., ESPN+	No. 2	No. 17 NC State	L 0–2	0–1–1	Cub Cadet Field (1,474); Akron, OH
September 1*; 7:00 p.m., ESPN+	No. 2	Pittsburgh	W 1–0	1–1–1	Cub Cadet Field (1,790); Akron, OH
September 7*; 10:30 p.m., WACDN	No. 12	at No. 24 Seattle U	L 1–2	1–2–1	Championship Field (514); Seattle, WA
September 9*; 4:30 p.m., P12N	No. 12	at No. 9 Washington	L 0–2	1–3–1	Husky Soccer Stadium (900); Seattle, WA
September 15*; 7:00 p.m., ESPN+		Canisius	W 10–0	2–3–1	Cub Cadet Field (1,585); Akron, OH
September 20*; 10:00 p.m., YouTube		at Grand Canyon	W 1–0	3–3–1	GCU Stadium (1,638); Phoenix, AZ
September 26*; 7:00 p.m., ESPN+		at VCU	W 4–3 ^{OT}	4–3–1	Sports Backers Stadium (682); Richmond, VA
October 1*; 7:00 p.m., ESPN+		Syracuse	L 1–3	4–4–1	Cub Cadet Field (1,598); Akron, OH
MAC Tournament
November 6; 4:00 p.m., ESPN3	(4)	(5) SIUE; First Round	W 2–1	8–6–2	Cub Cadet Field (360); Akron, OH
November 9; 5:40 p.m., ESPN3	(4)	at (1) No. 12 West Virginia; Semifinals	W 3–1	9–6–2	Dlesk Stadium (250); Morgantown, WV
November 11; 1:00 p.m., ESPN3	(4) No. 24	vs. (3) Western Michigan; MAC Championship	W 3–0	10–6–2	Dlesk Stadium (94); Morgantown, WV
NCAA Tournament
November 15*; 7:00 p.m., ESPN3	No. 16	Rider; First Round	W 3–1	11–6–2	Cub Cadet Field (421); Akron, OH
November 18*; 2:00 p.m., ACCN Extra	No. 16	vs. (16) No. 20 Syracuse; Second Round	W 3–1	12–6–2	Beyer-Small '76 Field (421); Hamilton, NY
November 25*; 5:00 p.m., ACCN	No. 10	at (1) No. 2 Wake Forest; Third Round	W 1–0	13–6–2	Spry Stadium (1,686); Winston-Salem, NC
November 30*; 9:00 p.m., P12N	No. 4	at (6) No. 2 Stanford; Quarterfinals	W 3–2	14–6–2	Cagan Stadium (1,405); Stanford, CA
December 7*; 8:00 p.m., ESPNU	No. 2	vs. No. 4 Michigan State; College Cup	W 5–1	15–6–2	Harder Stadium (4,988); Santa Barbara, CA
December 9*; 8:00 p.m., ESPN2	No. 2	vs. (11) No. 3 Maryland; National Championship	L 0–1	15–7–2	Harder Stadium; Santa Barbara, CA
*Non-conference game. ^{#}Rankings from TopDrawer Soccer. (#) Tournament seedings in parentheses. All times are in Eastern Time.

== Statistics ==
Individual Player Statistics (As of December 2, 2017)
Player	App	Goals	Asst	Points	Shots	Shot%	SOG	SOG%	GW	Pk-Att	GA	Saves	SO
Goalkeepers
Defenders
Midfielders
Forwards
