= 2018 Indiana Hoosiers men's soccer team =

American college soccer season

2018 Indiana Hoosiers men's soccer

Big Ten Regular Season and Tournament Champions Adidas/IU Credit Union Classic Champions

NCAA Tournament, College Cup
- Conference: Big Ten Conference
- U. Soc. Coaches poll: No. 3
- TopDrawerSoccer.com: No. 3
- Record: 20–3–1 (8–0–0 Big Ten)
- Head coach: Todd Yeagley (9th season)
- Assistant coaches: Kevin Robson (5th season); Zac Brown (2nd season); Danny O'Rourke (1st season)
- Captains: Andrew Gutman; Austin Panchot; Trey Muse
- Home stadium: Bill Armstrong Stadium

2018 Big Ten Conference men's soccer standings
	Conf.					Overall
Team	W		L		T	W		L		T
No. 3 Indiana ‡	8	–	0	–	0	20	–	3	–	1
Wisconsin	6	–	2	–	0	10	–	6	–	2
No. 4 Michigan State +	4	–	2	–	2	14	–	5	–	4
No. 24 Michigan +	4	–	2	–	2	12	–	5	–	4
No. 1 Maryland +	4	–	4	–	0	12	–	6	–	4
Penn State	3	–	3	–	2	6	–	9	–	2
Rutgers	2	–	6	–	0	4	–	13	–	1
Northwestern	0	–	5	–	3	6	–	9	–	5
Ohio State	0	–	7	–	1	1	–	15	–	2
$ – Conference champion; As of December 11, 2018; Rankings from United Soccer Coaches Poll; Source:The Big Ten Conference

The 2018 Indiana Hoosiers men's soccer team represented Indiana University Bloomington in men's college soccer during the 2018 NCAA Division I men's soccer season and 2018 Big Ten Conference men's soccer season. It was the 46th season the university fielded a men's varsity soccer program, and the 28th season the program played in the Big Ten Conference.

During the regular season Indiana completed the league double by winning both the Big Ten regular season, and the 2018 Big Ten Conference Men's Soccer Tournament. The Hoosiers were seeded second overall in the 2018 NCAA Division I Men's Soccer Tournament, where they reached the College Cup before losing to eventual national champions, and fellow Big Ten side, Maryland.

Indiana defender, Andrew Gutman, was named the winner of the Hermann Trophy, the top individual award a men's college soccer player can earn.

== Background ==
Long time assistant coach, Brian Maisonneuve, left Indiana to take the head coaching position at Ohio State. Former Indiana standout, Danny O'Rourke was hired as an assistant.

== Squad information ==
=== Roster ===
Note: Flags indicate national team as defined under FIFA eligibility rules; some limited exceptions apply. Players may hold more than one non-FIFA nationality.

No.	Pos.	Nation	Player
0	GK	USA	Sean Caulfield
1	GK	USA	Trey Muse
2	DF	USA	Jordan Kleyn
3	DF	USA	Jacob Meier
4	DF	USA	AJ Palazzolo
5	DF	USA	Timmy Mehl
6	MF	USA	Jack Maher
7	MF	USA	Trevor Swartz
9	FW	USA	Thomas Warr
10	MF	USA	Justin Rennicks
11	MF	USA	Cory Thomas
12	MF	USA	Austin Panchot
13	MF	USA	Francesco Moore
14	MF	USA	Griffin Dorsey

No.	Pos.	Nation	Player
15	DF	USA	Andrew Gutman
15	MF	USA	Joe Schmidt
17	MF	USA	Jeremiah Gutjahr
18	FW	USA	Ryan Wittenbrink
19	DF	USA	Rece Buckmaster
20	DF	USA	Ben Yeagley
21	DF	USA	Spencer Glass
22	FW	USA	Ian Black
23	DF	USA	Isaac Sorosy
25	MF	USA	Trey Kapsalis
26	MF	USA	Kyle Barks
28	DF	USA	John Bannec
29	GK	USA	Bryant Pratt
30	GK	USA	Jacob Gruber

=== Coaching staff ===
Front office
Athletic Director	Fred Glass
Deputy Athletic Director	Scott Dolson
Associate Athletic Director	Kristin Borrelli
Associate Athletic Director	Anthony Thompson
Terri Beatty	Executive Assistant
Coaching staff
Head coach	Todd Yeagley
Assistant coach	Kevin Robson
Assistant coach	Danny O'Rourke
Assistant coach	Zac Brown
Undergraduate assistant coach	Christian Lomeli

Last updated: December 26, 2018
Source: IUHoosiers.com

== Schedule ==
Date Time, TV	Rank^{#}	Opponent^{#}	Result	Record	Site (Attendance) City, State
Regular season
August 24*; 7:35 p.m., ACCN+	No. 2	at No. 5 Wake Forest	L 0–2	0–1–0	Spry Stadium (4,751); Winston-Salem, NC
August 26*; 7:30 p.m., ACCN+	No. 2	at No. 3 North Carolina	W 1–0	1–1–0	Spry Stadium (2,864); Winston-Salem, NC
August 31*; 8:15 p.m., BTN+	No. 6	No. 22 Dartmouth; Adidas/IU Credit Union Classic	W 3–0	2–1–0	Bill Armstrong Stadium (3,215); Bloomington, IN
September 2*; 8:00 p.m., BTN+	No. 6	No. 18 Connecticut; Adidas/IU Credit Union Classic	W 3–0	3–1–0	Bill Armstrong Stadium (3,851); Bloomington, IN
September 7*; 8:00 p.m., BTN+	No. 4	VCU	W 5–0	4–1–0	Bill Armstrong Stadium (2,130); Bloomington, IN
September 11*; 8:00 p.m., ACCN+	No. 4	at No. 8 Notre Dame; Rivalry	W 2–1 ^{OT}	5–1–0	Alumni Stadium (1,500); South Bend, IN
September 16; 3:00 p.m., BTN	No. 2	at Wisconsin	W 3–1	6–1–0 (1–0–0)	McClimon Stadium (1,289); Madison, WI
September 21*; 6:00 p.m.	No. 2	at Evansville	W 5–0	7–1–0	Arad McCutchan Stadium (1,683); Evansville, IN
September 25; 6:00 p.m., BTN+	No. 2	Northwestern	W 2–1	8–1–0 (2–0–0)	Bill Armstrong Stadium (1,568); Bloomington, IN
September 30; 1:00 p.m., BTN+	No. 2	Penn State	W 2–1	9–1–0 (3–0–0)	Bill Armstrong Stadium (2,352); Bloomington, IN
October 3*; 7:05 p.m., SECN+	No. 2	at No. 4 Kentucky; Rivalry	L 0–3	9–2–0	Bell Soccer Complex (3,503); Lexington, KY
October 7; 3:00 p.m., BTN	No. 2	at No. 14 Michigan	W 1–0	10–2–0 (4–0–0)	U-M Soccer Stadium (1,729); Ann Arbor, MI
October 12; 7:30 p.m., BTN+	No. 4	Maryland	W 2–1	11–2–0 (5–0–0)	Bill Armstrong Stadium (1,856); Bloomington, IN
October 16* p.m., BTN	No. 2	Butler; Crossroads Classic	W 3–0	12–2–0	Bill Armstrong Stadium (2,316); Bloomington, IN
October 19; 7:00 p.m., BTN	No. 2	at Rutgers	W 1–0	13–2–0 (6–0–0)	Yurcak Field (455); Piscataway, NJ
October 24; 7:00 p.m., BTN+	No. 2	at Ohio State	W 1–0	14–2–0 (7–0–0)	Owens Stadium (739); Columbus, OH
October 28; 4:05 p.m., ESPNU	No. 2	No. 12 Michigan State; Old Brass Spittoon	W 1–0 ^{OT}	15–2–0 (8–0–0)	Bill Armstrong Stadium (2,454); Bloomington, IN
Big Ten Tournament
November 4; 2:05 p.m., BTN+	(1) No. 2	(8) Northwestern; B1G Quarterfinals	W 2–1 ^{OT}	16–2–0	Bill Armstrong Stadium (1,005); Bloomington, IN
November 9; 1:05 p.m., BTN	(1) No. 2	vs. (5) No. 23 Maryland; B1G Semifinals	T 1–1; W 4–3 (p) ^{2OT}	16–2–1	Grand Park (360); Westfield, IN
November 11; 12:05 p.m., BTN	(1) No. 2	vs. (3) No. 24 Michigan; BIG Final	W 3–0	17–2–1	Grand Park (1,700); Westfield, IN
NCAA Tournament
November 18*; 12:00 p.m., BTN	(2) No. 2	No. 24 Connecticut; Second Round	W 4–0	18–2–1	Bill Armstrong Stadium (1,106); Bloomington, IN
November 25*; 12:05 p.m., BTN	(2) No. 2	No. 20 Air Force; Sweet Sixteen	W 2–0	19–2–1	Bill Armstrong Stadium (2,179); Bloomington, IN
November 30*; 7:00 p.m., BTN+	(2) No. 2	(7) No. 6 Notre Dame; Elite Eight	W 1–0	20–2–1	Bill Armstrong Stadium (5,159); Bloomington, IN
December 7; 10:30 p.m., ESPNU	(2) No. 1	vs. (11) No. 3 Maryland; College Cup, Semifinals	L 0–2	20–3–1	Harder Stadium (4,988); Santa Barbara, CA
*Non-conference game. ^{#}Rankings from United Soccer Coaches. (#) Tournament seedings in parentheses. All times are in Eastern Time.

== Statistics ==
=== Appearances and goals ===
No.	Pos	Nat	Player	Total		Regular Season		Big Ten Tournament		NCAA Tournament	
No.	Pos	Nat	Player	Apps	Goals	Apps	Goals	Apps	Goals	Apps	Goals
Goalkeepers
0	GK	(United States) USA	Sean Caulfield	3	0	0+3	0	0	0	0	0
1	GK	(United States) USA	Trey Muse	24	0	18+0	0	3+0	0	3+0	0
29	GK	(United States) USA	Bryant Pratt	0	0	0	0	0	0	0	0
30	GK	(United States) USA	Jacob Gruber	0	0	0	0	0	0	0	0
Defenders
2	DF	(United States) USA	Jordan Kleyn	14	0	2+8	0	0+1	0	0+3	0
3	DF	(United States) USA	Jacob Meier	4	0	0+3	0	0	0	0+1	0
4	DF	(United States) USA	A. J. Palazzolo	24	4	4+14	4	2+1	0	0+3	0
5	DF	(United States) USA	Timmy Mehl	24	3	18+0	1	3+0	0	3+0	2
6	DF	(United States) USA	Jack Maher	24	0	18+0	0	3+0	0	3+0	0
15	DF	(United States) USA	Andrew Gutman	23	11	16+1	9	3+0	1	3+0	1
19	DF	(United States) USA	Rece Buckmaster	24	4	16+2	3	3+0	1	3+0	0
23	DF	(United States) USA	Isaac Sorosy	0	0	0	0	0	0	0	0
28	DF	(United States) USA	John Bannec	0	0	0	0	0	0	0	0
Midfielders
7	MF	(United States) USA	Trevor Swartz	24	1	12+6	1	3+0	0	3+0	0
12	MF	(United States) USA	Austin Panchot	24	5	9+9	3	3+0	0	3+0	2
13	MF	(United States) USA	Francesco Moore	24	0	17+1	0	3+0	0	2+1	0
14	MF	(United States) USA	Griffin Dorsey	21	1	15+2	0	1+0	0	3+0	1
16	MF	(United States) USA	Joe Schmidt	15	0	0+11	0	0+2	0	0+2	0
17	MF	(United States) USA	Jeremiah Gutjahr	24	1	17+1	0	3+0	1	3+0	0
20	MF	(United States) USA	Ben Yeagley	0	0	0	0	0	0	0	0
21	MF	(United States) USA	Spencer Glass	6	3	0	0	0+3	2	0+3	1
25	MF	(United States) USA	Trey Kapsalis	0	0	0	0	0	0	0	0
26	MF	(United States) USA	Kyle Barks	0	0	0	0	0	0	0	0
Forwards
9	FW	(United States) USA	Thomas Warr	10	0	0+6	0	0+3	0	0+1	0
10	FW	(United States) USA	Justin Rennicks	20	6	18+0	6	0	0	2+0	0
11	FW	(United States) USA	Corey Thomas	6	1	0	0	3+0	1	2+1	0
18	FW	(United States) USA	Ryan Wittenbrink	0	0	0	0	0	0	0	0
22	FW	(United States) USA	Ian Black	11	0	0+7	0	0+3	0	0+1	0

Last updated: December 8, 2018
Source: 2018 IU Men's Soccer Statistics

== Awards ==
Date	Player	Award	Ref.
August 28	A.J. Palazzolo	Big Ten Offensive Player of the Week	
September 4	Andrew Gutman	Big Ten Offensive Player of the Week	
September 4	Trey Muse	Big Ten Defensive Player of the Week	
October 16	Andrew Gutman	Big Ten Offensive Player of the Week	
October 23	Trevor Swartz	Big Ten Offensive Player of the Week	
October 30	Andrew Gutman	Big Ten Offensive Player of the Week	
October 30	Trey Muse	Big Ten Defensive Player of the Week	
November 2	Andrew Gutman	Big Ten Defensive Player of the Year	
November 2	Trey Muse	Big Ten Goalkeeper of the Year	
November 2	Jack Maher	Big Ten Freshman of the Year	
November 2	Todd Yeagley	Big Ten Coach of the Year	
November 2	Griffin Dorsey	All-Big Ten First Team	
November 2	Francesco Moore	All-Big Ten First Team	
November 2	Andrew Gutman	All-Big Ten First Team	
November 2	Trey Muse	All-Big Ten First Team	
November 2	Justin Rennicks	All-Big Ten Second Team	
November 2	Trevor Swartz	All-Big Ten Second Team	
November 2	Timmy Mehl	All-Big Ten Second Team	
November 2	Rece Buckmaster	All-Big Ten Second Team	
November 2	Jeremiah Gutjahr	Big Ten Sportsmanship Award Honoree	
November 11	Andrew Gutman	Big Ten Tournament Defensive MVP	
November 11	Cory Thomas	Big Ten Tournament Offensive MVP	
December 4	Griffin Dorsey	United Soccer Coaches All-North Region	
December 4	Andrew Gutman	United Soccer Coaches All-North Region	
December 4	Francesco Moore	United Soccer Coaches All-North Region	
December 4	Trey Muse	United Soccer Coaches All-North Region	
December 4	Justin Rennicks	United Soccer Coaches All-North Region	
December 7	Andrew Gutman	United Soccer Coaches All-America	
December 7	Trey Muse	United Soccer Coaches All-America	
December 17	Andrew Gutman	TopDrawerSoccer.com National Player of the Year Award	
