= Umar Farouk Osman =

Ghanaian footballer

Personal information
- Full name: Umar Farouk Osman
- Date of birth: September 23, 1998 (age 28)
- Place of birth: Tamale, Ghana
- Height: 5 ft 9 in (1.75 m)
- Position: Midfielder

Team information
- Current team: Michigan Wolverines
- Number: 7

Youth career
- 2009–2013: Right To Dream Academy
- 2013–2017: Dover Dreamers
- 2017: Black Rock FC

College career
Years	Team	Apps	(Gls)
2017–2021	Michigan Wolverines	79	(10)

Senior career*
Years	Team	Apps	(Gls)
2019	Flint City Bucks	1	(0)
- * Club domestic league appearances and goals as of 20 November 2018

Umar Farouk Osman (born September 23, 1998) is a Ghanaian footballer who plays college soccer for the Michigan Wolverines men's soccer program.

Osman is the 2017 recipient of Gatorade Player of the Year award for boys' soccer. The award is a nationally recognized honor given to the best high school athlete in the nation. Osman won the award while playing for the Hotchkiss School in Lakeville, Connecticut. Outside of playing for the Hotchkiss Bearcats boys' soccer team, Osman also played club soccer for Black Rock FC.

== Senior ==
During the 2019 USL League Two season, Osman played one match for the Flint City Bucks.
