= Marcello Borges =

American soccer player

Personal information
- Full name: Marcello A. Borges
- Date of birth: September 13, 1997 (age 29)
- Place of birth: Kearny, New Jersey, United States
- Height: 1.75 m (5 ft 9 in)
- Position: Defender

Team information
- Current team: Atlantic City
- Number: 7

Youth career
- 2010–2015: New York Red Bulls

College career
Years	Team	Apps	(Gls)
2015–2018	Michigan Wolverines	61	(0)

Senior career*
Years	Team	Apps	(Gls)
2015	New York Red Bulls II	2	(0)
2016–2017	New York Red Bulls U-23	10	(1)
2018	Michigan Bucks	3	(0)
2019	Detroit City	7	(1)
2020–	Atlantic City	0	(0)

International career^{‡}
2015	United States U18	1	(0)
2015	United States U20	10	(0)
- * Club domestic league appearances and goals as of March 8, 2020 ‡ National team caps and goals as of October 5, 2016

Marcello Borges (born September 13, 1997) is an American soccer player who plays for Atlantic City FC in the National Premier Soccer League.

== Career ==
=== Youth, college and amateur ===
Raised in Kearny, New Jersey, Borges attended Kearny High School and briefly played prep soccer for the school's varsity team before spending the remainder of his youth career with the New York Red Bulls Academy. In February 2015, Borges signed a letter of intent to play college soccer at the University of Michigan. A month later, he signed an academy level contract with USL club New York Red Bulls II, which allowed him to play for the club without forfeiting his college eligibility. He made his debut a day later in a goalless draw against Rochester Rhinos.

In his freshman year with the Wolverines, Borges made only 11 appearances, starting in five of them. He missed a portion of the season due to the fact he was on U.S. U-20 national team duty.

He also played in the Premier Development League for New York Red Bulls U-23.

He was drafted by the Colorado Rapids of Major League Soccer in the 2019 MLS SuperDraft.

=== International ===
Borges has represented the United States in the under-18 and under-20 level.

== Career statistics ==
Club	Season	League			League Cup		Domestic Cup		International		Total	
Club	Season	Division	Apps	Goals	Apps	Goals	Apps	Goals	Apps	Goals	Apps	Goals
New York Red Bulls II	2015	USL	2	0	0	0	0	0	—	—	2	0
Career total			2	0	0	0	0	0	0	0	2	0
