= Jimmy Hague =

American soccer player

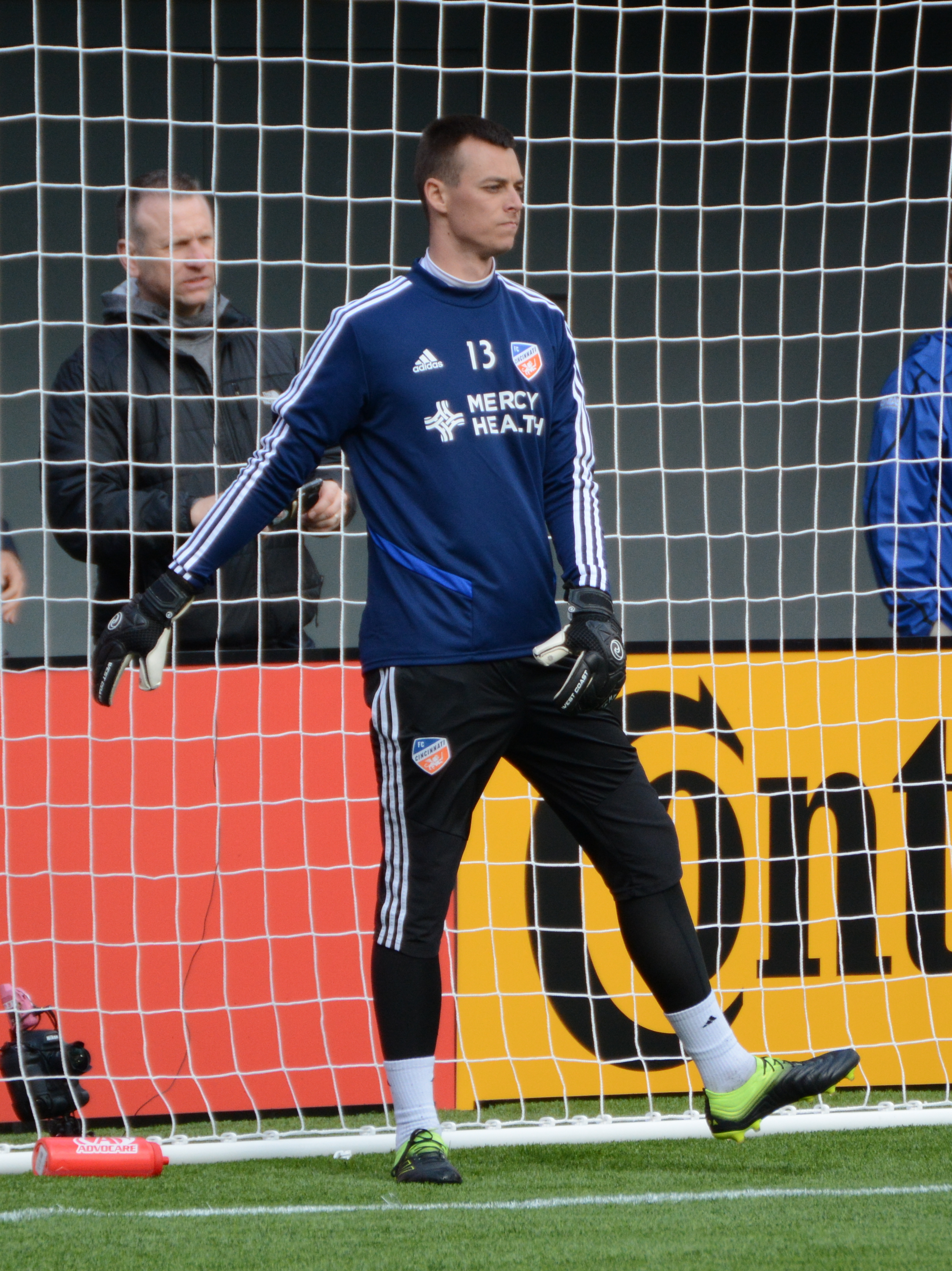

Personal information
- Date of birth: August 28, 1996 (age 30)
- Place of birth: Walled Lake, Michigan, United States
- Height: 6 ft 3 in (1.91 m)
- Position: Goalkeeper

Youth career
- Michigan Jaguars

College career
Years	Team	Apps	(Gls)
2015–2018	Michigan State Spartans	63	(0)

Senior career*
Years	Team	Apps	(Gls)
2018	Michigan Bucks	4	(0)
2019	FC Cincinnati	0	(0)
2020	Memphis 901	9	(0)
- * Club domestic league appearances and goals as of October 5, 2020

Jimmy Hague (born August 28, 1996) is an American soccer player.

== Career ==
=== College and amateur ===
Hague played college soccer at Michigan State University between 2015 and 2018, becoming starter for the team for 3 seasons and making 63 appearances for the Spartans.

While at college, Hague also played with USL PDL side Michigan Bucks.

=== Professional ===
On January 11, 2019, Hague was selected 30th overall in the 2019 MLS SuperDraft by FC Cincinnati. On February 6, 2019, Hague signed for Cincinnati. He was waived following the 2019 season without making a first team appearance for the club.

On January 28, 2020, Hague signed with USL Championship side Memphis 901.

=== Personal ===
Upon retirement Jimmy sought to break the world record for most hot dogs eaten in one day. January 2022 he faced off with Takeru Kobayashi in a private contest at Rick's American Cafe in East Lansing, Michigan. During the contest Jimmy choked on a "hot dog" and had to receive CPR.
