= Amar Sejdić =

American soccer player (born 1996)

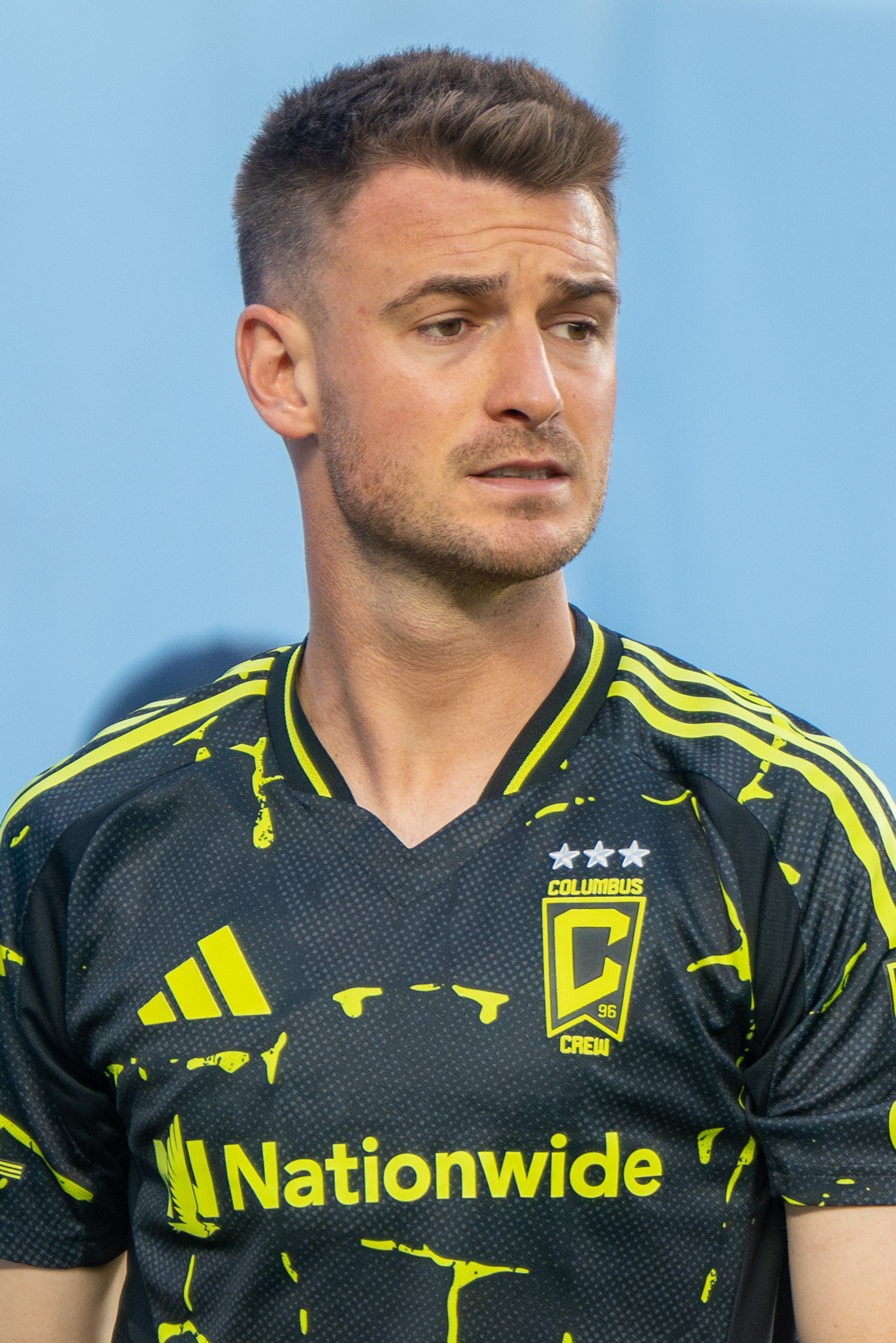
- Sejdić with the Columbus Crew in 2026

Personal information
- Full name: Amar Sejdić
- Date of birth: November 29, 1996 (age 29)
- Place of birth: Berlin, Germany
- Height: 5 ft 10 in (1.78 m)
- Position: Midfielder

Team information
- Current team: Columbus Crew
- Number: 14

Youth career
- 2002–2011: United 1996 FC
- 2011–2014: Derby City Rovers
- 2013–2014: Vitesse
- 2014–2015: Real Salt Lake

College career
Years	Team	Apps	(Gls)
2015–2018	Maryland Terrapins	78	(22)

Senior career*
Years	Team	Apps	(Gls)
2017–2018	Derby City Rovers	0	(0)
2019–2021	CF Montréal (Note: Montreal Impact changed its name to CF Montréal in 2021)	22	(2)
2019	→ Ottawa Fury (loan)	3	(0)
2021–2023	Atlanta United	56	(0)
2024	Nashville SC	17	(0)
2025–	Columbus Crew	14	(0)
2025–	Columbus Crew 2	1	(0)
- * Club domestic league appearances and goals as of 12:30, 26 October 2025 (UTC)

Amar Sejdić (born November 29, 1996) is an American professional soccer player who plays as a central midfielder for Major League Soccer club Columbus Crew.

== Early life ==
Sejdić was born in Berlin, Germany to Bosnian parents. His father hails from Jakeš near Modriča and his mother hails from Derventa. They fled Bosnia due to the Bosnian War and took refuge in Germany. At age four, Sejdić moved to the United States.

== Youth career ==
Sejdić played with affiliate clubs United 1996 and the Derby City Rovers in Louisville, Kentucky, before traveling abroad to play for the under-19 team of Vitesse in the Netherlands. Sejdić played a single season with the U-19 team before visa issues shortened his stay. As a result, he came back to the United States to play with the academy of Real Salt Lake.

== College career ==
During the 2015 NCAA Division I men's soccer season, Sejdić became a regular rotation player, appearing in 15 matches for the Terrapins. Sejdić scored his first two college goals against St. John's on August 30, 2015. On September 27, 2015; Sejdić notched his first collegiate assist in a 4–1 win against Wisconsin. During his second year he appeared in all matches for the Terrapins, where he contributed to nine goals and nine assists during the 2016 NCAA Division I men's soccer season. Two of Sejdić's nine goals came during the 2016 NCAA Division I Men's Soccer Tournament, in a 5–4 second-round upset loss to Providence. The first goal coming via a fortuitous 40-yard free kick that "got caught in the wind." During the 2017 season, Sejdić remained an integral part of the team and scored three goals and dished out four assists. Sejdić had a breakout season during 2018, as he captained Maryland to their fourth College Cup title, earning offensive MVP honors as he scored the only goal of the game from the penalty spot in the 57th minute of a 1–0 victory against Akron. He was named to the Big Ten best XI during the 2018 Big Ten Conference men's soccer season.

During the 2017 and 2018 college offseasons, Sejdić played for the Derby City Rovers.

== Club career ==
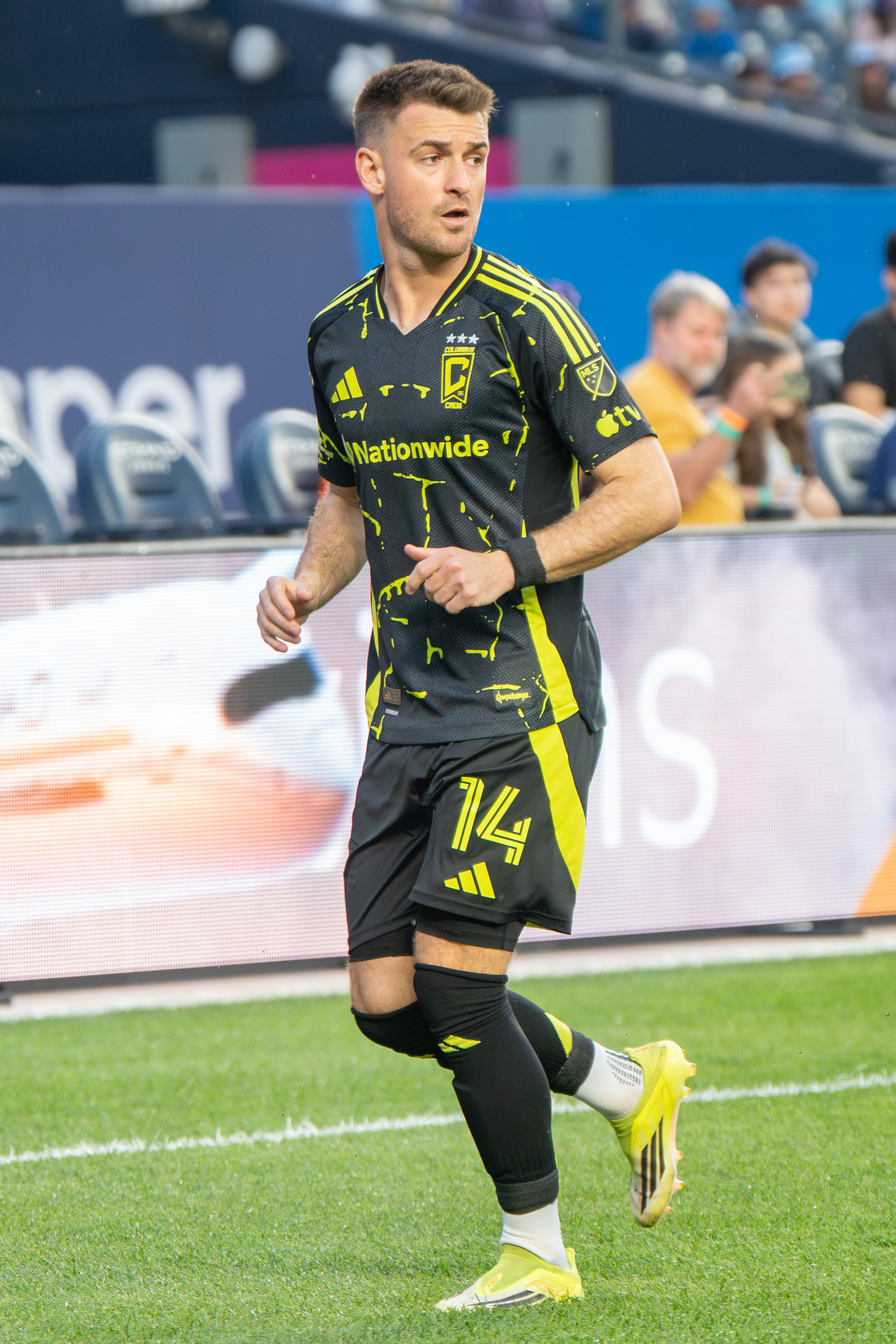
Amar Sejdic with the Columbus Crew in 2026

On January 11, 2019, Sejdić was selected in the second round of the 2019 MLS SuperDraft with the 34th overall pick by the Montreal Impact, In a bid to help him acclimate to the professional game, Sejdić was sent on loan to the Ottawa Fury in the USL Championship, where he made three appearances before being recalled by Montréal. He would start in his only appearance for the Impact during the 2019 season, spending much of the year continuing to adapt to the professional game.

To begin the 2020 season, Sejdić made his CONCACAF Champions League debut — starting against Costa Rican club Saprissa on February 19, 2020. Montréal would advance on aggregate to the quarter-finals against Honduran club C.D. Olimpia. After the first leg concluded with a 2–1 Montréal loss at home, the competition was paused due to the COVID-19 pandemic. Following the resumption of league play, Sejdić scored his first professional goal on October 10, against the Philadelphia Union. He scored his second goal of the year in the following match against the New England Revolution. Sejdić scored his final goal of the season in the second leg of the postponed Champions League match against C.D. Olimpia on December 15, 2020, as his club was eliminated on aggregate.

After appearing in seven games for Montréal in 2021, Sejdić was traded to Atlanta United in July in exchange for $100,000 of General Allocation Money, with the potential for the fee to rise another $50,000.

On February 8, 2024, Sejdić signed with Nashville SC on a one-year deal following a successful preseason trial with the club. He was released by Nashville following their 2024 season.

On March 3, 2025, it was announced that Sejdić had signed with the Columbus Crew for the 2025 season, with a 2026 option year. Following the conclusion of the 2025 season, his option year was picked up.

== Style of play ==
Sejdić has been recognized for his passing and technical play, with his college head coach Sasho Cirovski commenting: “He’s got great feet and he’s got the ability to make that killer pass, or he can score a number of goals from distance.” Speaking about his own playing style, Sejdić said: “I like to think I’m a player with intellect. I play more with my mind and my feet are just the tools. I read the game well. The ball is my best friend and I like to keep it in my feet. I could handle and distribute the ball well, and I like giving my teammates the best scoring opportunities possible.”

== Career statistics ==
=== Club ===
As of match played March 11, 2023

Appearances and goals by club, season and competition
Club	Season	League			National cup		Continental		Other		Total	
Club	Season	Division	Apps	Goals	Apps	Goals	Apps	Goals	Apps	Goals	Apps	Goals
Derby City Rovers	2017	Premier Development League	0	0	—		—		—		0	0
Derby City Rovers	2018	Premier Development League	0	0	—		—		—		0	0
Derby City Rovers	Total		0	0	0	0	0	0	0	0	0	0
Montreal Impact	2019	Major League Soccer	1	0	0	0	—		—		1	0
Montreal Impact	2020	Major League Soccer	14	2	0	0	3 (Note: Appearance(s) in CONCACAF Champions League)	1	1 (Note: Appearance(s) in MLS Cup Playoffs)	0	18	3
Montreal Impact	2021	Major League Soccer	7	0	—		—		—		7	0
Montreal Impact	Total		22	2	0	0	3	1	1	0	26	3
Ottawa Fury(loan)	2019	USL Championship	3	0	—		—		—		3	0
Atlanta United	2021	Major League Soccer	10	0	—		0	0	—		10	0
Atlanta United	2022	Major League Soccer	23	0	2 (Note: Appearance(s) in U.S. Open Cup)	0	—		—		25	0
Atlanta United	2023	Major League Soccer	3	0	0	0	—		—		3	0
Atlanta United	Total		36	0	2	0	0	0	0	0	38	0
Career total			61	2	2	0	3	1	1	0	67	3

== Honors ==
Maryland Terrapins

- NCAA Division I men's soccer tournament: 2018

Montreal Impact

- Canadian Championship: 2019
