= Andrew Gutman =

American soccer player (born 1996)

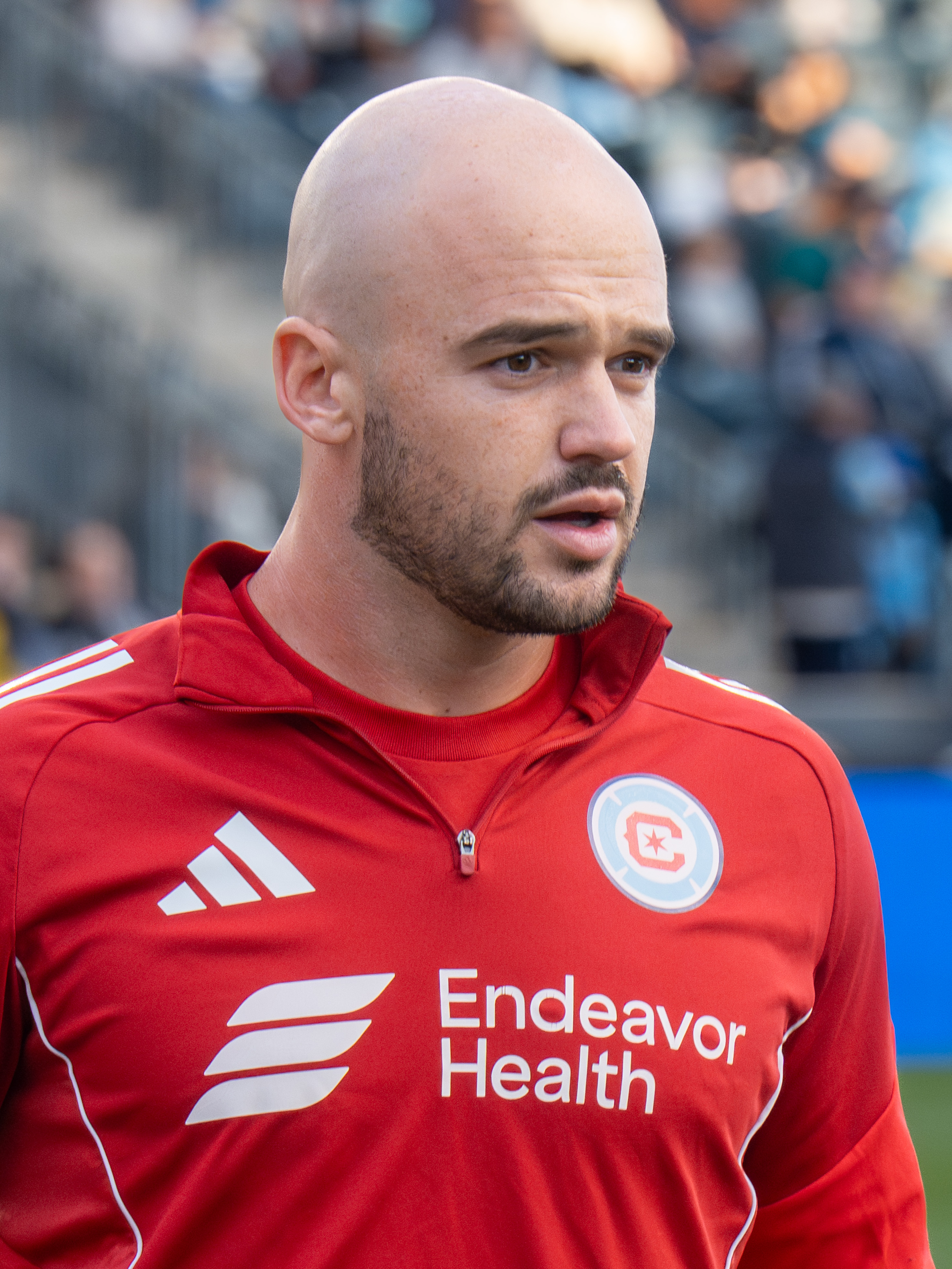
- Gutman with the Chicago Fire in 2025

Personal information
- Full name: Andrew David Gutman
- Date of birth: October 2, 1996 (age 30)
- Place of birth: Hinsdale, Illinois, U.S.
- Height: 5 ft 10 in (1.78 m)
- Position: Left-back

Team information
- Current team: Chicago Fire
- Number: 15

Youth career
- 2011: Hinsdale Red Devils
- 2012–2015: Chicago Fire

College career
Years	Team	Apps	(Gls)
2015–2018	Indiana Hoosiers	90	(20)

Senior career*
Years	Team	Apps	(Gls)
2016	Chicago Fire U-23	13	(2)
2019–2021	Celtic	0	(0)
2019	→ Charlotte Independence (loan)	14	(3)
2019–2020	→ FC Cincinnati (loan)	29	(0)
2021–2023	Atlanta United	43	(7)
2021	→ New York Red Bulls (loan)	22	(2)
2023	Colorado Rapids	12	(1)
2024–	Chicago Fire	71	(5)
- * Club domestic league appearances and goals as of November 17, 2026

Andrew David Gutman (born October 2, 1996) is an American professional soccer player who plays as a left-back for Major League Soccer club Chicago Fire.

== Career ==
=== Youth and college ===
Prior to college soccer, Gutman played high school soccer for one season at Hinsdale Central High School before joining the Chicago Fire's youth academy for his sophomore through senior years of high school.

Ahead of the 2015 NCAA Division I men's soccer season, Gutman signed a National Letter of Intent to play for the Indiana Hoosiers men's soccer program. He immersed himself as an immediate starter with the program starting in all 21 matches for the Hoosiers during the 2015 season. He finished his freshman year by being named to the Big Ten All-Second Team, the Big Ten All-Freshman Team, and the NSCAA All-Midwest Regional team. He finished his freshman season with one goal and one assist. Gutman remained a regular starter for the Hoosiers entering his sophomore season, where he made 21 appearances. He led the team in assists his sophomore year with three, and scored once. Following the conclusion of the 2016 season, he was named to the Big Ten second-team, and to the all-Midwest NSCAA team.

It was speculated that Gutman might forgo his last two seasons of collegiate eligibility and sign a contract with Chicago Fire. However, Todd Yeagley confirmed in July that Gutman would be returning to Indiana for his junior year. During his third year with the Hoosiers, he picked up several conference, regional, and national honors. During the season, he scored seven goals and dished out four assists, to have 18 total points. His honors his junior included being named a second-team All-American by United Soccer Coaches and CollegeSoccerNews.com. Gutman was named a third-team All-American by TopDrawerSoccer.com. Furthermore, he was named to the All-Midwest region by United Soccer Coaches, and named to the All-Tournament team for the 2017 NCAA Division I Men's Soccer Tournament.

It was speculated by the media that Gutman would sign a homegrown contract with the Chicago Fire once again, but he returned to Indiana for his senior season. Ahead of the 2018 NCAA Division I men's soccer season, he was listed on the First-Team Preseason Best XI by Top Drawer Soccer, listed on the Missouri Athletic Club's Hermann Trophy watchlist, and was listed as the second best player in the nation by Top Drawer Soccer, and the best player in the Big Ten by Top Drawer Soccer.

During Gutman's senior season, he started 23 of 24 matches for the Hoosiers and led the team with 11 goals on the season, despite being a defender. He was also second on the team in assists, dishing out nine assists. He anchored Indiana's back line which led the NCAA in shutouts (15) and allowed 13 goals all season. Following his senior year, Gutman earned accolades including winning the Big Ten Defensive Player of the Year, and being listed as a Hermann Trophy finalist. He was listed as a first-team All-American by United Soccer Coaches, and won the men's TopDrawerSoccer.com National Player of the Year Award.

On January 4, 2019; two weeks after winning the TDS Award, Gutman won the Hermann Trophy, which is considered the most prestigious award for a college soccer player.

Between college soccer seasons, Gutman played one season in the USL League Two, then known as the Premier Development League. During the 2016 PDL season, he played with Chicago Fire U-23, where he made 13 appearances, scoring two goals, and having three assists.

Following the 2018 NCAA Division I men's soccer season, Gutman was offered a one-week trial with Scottish Premiership side Rangers starting on December 18. It was also reported and confirmed by a Chicago Fire team spokesperson that the club had offered him a homegrown contract with the club, which he turned down.

== Club career ==
=== Celtic ===
In January 2019, Gutman signed a contract with Rangers' long-time rivals, Celtic. On January 19, 2019, he played in a friendly for Celtic reserve side as a trialist in a 3–4 loss to Arbroath.

On January 31, 2019, Celtic announced that it had signed Gutman to a three-year contract. He was immediately loaned to Nashville SC in the USL Championship for the 2019 season. Nashville rescinded their acceptance of Gutman on loan on February 2, citing Major League Soccer's disapproval of the loan.

==== Charlotte Independence (loan) ====
A week later after the Nashville loan was called off, it was announced by The Charlotte Post that Gutman would be joining the Charlotte Independence of the USL Championship on loan for the 2019 USL Championship season, the second tier of soccer in the U.S. On March 15, 2019, Gutman made his debut with Charlotte scoring a second half goal in a 3–2 loss to Indy Eleven. On April 16, 2019, Gutman opened the scoring for Charlotte in a 2–1 victory over Bethlehem Steel FC. On June 15, 2019, Gutman helped Charlotte to a 4–1 victory over Birmingham Legion, scoring the opening goal of the match.

==== FC Cincinnati (loan) ====
On August 3, 2019, Gutman was loaned to Major League Soccer side FC Cincinnati through the 2020 MLS season. As part of the transaction, Cincinnati sent $50,000 of General Allocation Money (GAM) to the Chicago Fire in exchange for Gutman's MLS rights and a third-round pick in the 2020 MLS SuperDraft. In addition, the Fire could receive up to an additional $150,000 in GAM if Gutman was added to FC Cincinnati's roster and met certain performance-based metrics and would receive a percentage of any future revenue should FC Cincinnati transfer or loan Gutman outside of MLS. On August 10, 2019, Gutman made his Major League Soccer debut for Cincinnati, appearing as a starter in a 2–2 draw with Columbus Crew.

=== Atlanta United ===
On December 17, 2020, he was selected by Atlanta United in Stage 1 of the 2020 MLS Re-Entry Draft. On March 9, 2021, Gutman was signed permanently by Major League Soccer club Atlanta United on a three-year deal from Celtic.

==== New York Red Bulls (loan) ====
On March 9, 2021, Gutman was signed by Atlanta United and then immediately loaned to the New York Red Bulls for the 2021 season. On April 17, 2021, Gutman made his debut for New York, appearing as a starter in a 2–1 loss to Sporting Kansas City. On April 25, 2021, he scored his first goal for New York in a 3–2 loss to Los Angeles Galaxy. On October 2, 2021, Gutman scored the lone goal in New York's 1–0 victory over his former club FC Cincinnati.

=== Colorado Rapids ===
On July 5, 2023, Gutman was acquired by the Colorado Rapids in exchange for $400,000 in guaranteed General Allocation Money (GAM), a conditional $150,000 in GAM if he were to reach certain performance metrics, and an international roster slot. He made his debut on July 8, 2023, against FC Dallas.

=== Chicago Fire FC ===
On December 12, 2023, Chicago Fire FC acquired Gutman from Colorado in exchange for defender Miguel Navarro and $450,000 in General Allocation Money ($225,000 in 2024 & $225,000 in 2025). He made his debut for Chicago on February 24, 2024 against the Philadelphia Union at Subaru Park in Chester, Pa.

== Career statistics ==
=== Club ===
As of January 27, 2026

Appearances and goals by club, season and competition
Club	Season	League			National cup (Note: Includes U.S. Open Cup)		Continental		Other		Total	
Club	Season	Division	Apps	Goals	Apps	Goals	Apps	Goals	Apps	Goals	Apps	Goals
Chicago Fire U-23	2016	USL PDL	13	2	—		—		—		13	2
Celtic	2018–19	Scottish Premiership	0	0	—		—		—		0	0
Charlotte Independence (loan)	2019	USL Championship	14	3	1	0	—		—		15	3
FC Cincinnati (loan)	2019	MLS	8	0	—		—		—		8	0
FC Cincinnati (loan)	2020	MLS	21	0	—		—		1 (Note: Appearance in MLS is Back Tournament knockout stage)	0	22	0
FC Cincinnati (loan)	Total		29	0	—		—		1	0	30	0
New York Red Bulls (loan)	2021	MLS	22	2	—		—		1 (Note: Appearance in MLS Cup Playoffs)	0	23	2
Atlanta United	2021	MLS	0	0	—		—		—		0	0
Atlanta United	2022	MLS	25	4	2	0	—		—		27	4
Atlanta United	2023	MLS	18	3	1	0	—		—		19	3
Atlanta United	Total		43	7	3	0	—		—		46	7
Colorado Rapids	2023	MLS	12	1	—		—		2 (Note: Appearances in Leagues Cup)	1	14	2
Chicago Fire FC	2024	MLS	11	1	—		—		2	0	13	1
Chicago Fire FC	2025	MLS	34	3	3	0	—		—		37	3
Chicago Fire FC	Total		45	4	3	0	—		2	0	46	4
Career total			178	19	7	0	—		6	1	191	20

== Honors ==
Individual

- Big Ten Men's Soccer Defensive Player of the Year: 2018
- TopDrawer Soccer National Player of the Year: 2018
- Hermann Trophy: 2018
