= Sasho Cirovski =

Macedonian footballer

Personal information
- Date of birth: 14 October 1962 (age 64)
- Place of birth: Vratnica, Yugoslavia
- Position: Midfielder

College career
Years	Team	Apps	(Gls)
1981–1984	Milwaukee Panthers		

Senior career*
Years	Team	Apps	(Gls)
- Windsor Wheels
- London City
1986–1987	Milwaukee Wave (indoor)	26	(4)
1987	North York Rockets	16	(0)

Managerial career
- North York Rockets
- –1991: Milwaukee Wave (assistant)
- 1988–1990: Milwaukee Panthers (assistant)
- 1991–1992: Hartford Hawks
- 1993–: Maryland Terrapins
- * Club domestic league appearances and goals

Sasho Cirovski (born 14 October 1962) is a Macedonian-Canadian soccer coach of the University of Maryland. Born in North Macedonia and raised in Windsor, Ontario, Canada, Cirovski led his University of Maryland team to the NCAA championship in 2005, 2008, and 2018.

== Early life and career ==
Born in Macedonia, he grew up in Vratnica, a small village. Cirovski immigrated to Canada at the age of eight and became an outstanding all-around athlete in Ontario schools. A stand-out college soccer player for the University of Wisconsin–Milwaukee he was selected the school's outstanding athlete upon his graduation in 1985. He earned a master's degree there in 1989. He played for the Milwaukee Wave of the American Indoor Soccer Association during the 1986–1987 season and later played and coached the North York Rockets. His subsequent coaching career included stints at both his alma mater and at the University of Hartford, where he led his team to two consecutive NCAA Tournament berths.

== Cirovski at Maryland ==
In February 1993 Cirovski was recruited by then Assistant Athletic Director Gothard Lane to come to the University of Maryland, College Park, where the soccer program had enjoyed limited success for years. Upon his arrival in College Park, Cirovski startled the local soccer community when he announced that his goal was to "win the national championship." Starting with holdover players and two transfer students from Hartford who came to join their charismatic coach, his teams began to turn out winning records within two years. In 2002, the Terrapins began a remarkable streak of four consecutive appearances in the NCAA College Cup, the final four of American college soccer. In 2005, they captured the national title with a 1–0 win over top-ranked University of New Mexico. In 2008, he led the Terps to an ACC championship win over Virginia, the team's first since 2002, and also guided his team to the 2008 National Championship over North Carolina by a score of 1–0 in Frisco, Texas.

In October 2017, Cirovski achieved his 400th win in Division I versus the Wisconsin Badgers, becoming the ninth Division I coach to achieve the feat. In 2018, the Terrapins won their third national title under Cirovski with a 1–0 win over the University of Akron, not allowing a goal in any game of the NCAA Tournament. In 2025, Cirovski won the Big 10 regular season Championship, going undefeated with seven wins and two draws.

== Personal information ==
A vocal and demonstrative coach, Cirovski cultivated a "family" atmosphere on his close-knit teams. He also earned the respect of his colleagues, who selected him as the chairman of the national collegiate coaches association in 2004, and the national coach of the year in 2005. He lived in the Maryland suburbs with his wife Shannon Higgins-Cirovski, herself a former soccer All-American and member of the National Soccer Hall of Fame, and their three daughters.

A young Cirovski can be seen performing his soccer skills in the 1987 ESPN Home Video, "Teaching Kids Soccer with Bob Gansler."
