= List of NCAA Division I men's soccer teams ranked in the 2018 Top 25 coaches poll =

2018 NCAA Division I
men's soccer
Top 25 coaches poll
←2017 | 2019→

This is a week-by-week listing of the NCAA Division I teams ranked in the 2018 Top 25 coaches poll of the United Soccer Coaches (formerly the National Soccer Coaches Association of America NSCAA), the most widely recognized national collegiate soccer ranking system in the U.S. Several weeks prior to the season and each week during the playing season, the 206 Division I teams are voted on by a panel of 24 coaches from the division during a weekly conference call, with the rankings then announced early on Tuesday afternoon (Eastern Time). The poll has no bearing on the selections for the 2018 NCAA Division I Men's Soccer Championship, and the coaches association states: "The NSCAA College Rankings are an indicator of week-to-week status of qualified programs and in no way should be used as a guide or indicator of eligibility for championship selection."

== Rankings ==
First place votes received in parentheses; rv = received votes. Source =

School	Preseason August 8	Week 1	Week 2	Week 3	Week 4	Week 5	Week 6	Week 7	Week 8	Week 9	Week 10	Week 11	Week 12	Final Poll
Maryland	rv	—	rv	—	—	—	—	—	—	—	—	rv	15	1 (28)
Akron	4 (1)	4 (2)	14	rv	—	—	—	—	—	—	—	—	16	2 (2)
Indiana	2 (2)	6	4	2 (2)	2 (2)	2 (1)	2 (1)	4 (2)	2 (4)	2 (2)	2 (1)	2	1 (19)	3
Michigan State	7	5	3 (1)	4 (1)	5	5	13	8	13	12	17	rv	rv	4
Kentucky	rv	rv	rv	6	7	7	4 (1)	5 (1)	3 (3)	3 (1)	3 (4)	3	3 (1)	5
Wake Forest	5	1 (24)	1 (27)	1 (23)	1 (24)	1 (27)	1 (26)	2 (1)	1 (22)	1 (24)	1 (21)	1 (27)	2 (7)	6
Stanford	1 (23)	10	25	rv	rv	rv	18	10	12	9	6 (1)	6	7	7
Notre Dame	17	24	12	8	8	20	15	9	16	23	18	16	13	8
Saint Mary's	—	—	rv	rv	17	10	9	6	4	4 (1)	5	5	4 (1)	9
James Madison	—	—	—	—	—	—	—	rv	rv	25	rv	rv	rv	10
Duke	10	2 (2)	2	10	9	15	23	17	14	14	8	8	10	11
Air Force	rv	—	rv	23	10	8	7	15	15	8	12	13	20	12
Georgetown	13	rv	20	rv	—	rv	—	—	rv	24	rv	19	12	13
North Carolina	3 (2)	12	5	3 (2)	3 (2)	3	3	1 (22)	5	5	4 (1)	4 (1)	6	14
Virginia	15	7	10	19	22	11	10	14	6	6	7	11	11	15
Louisville	6	9	7	7	6	6	6	11	10	17	15	10	5	16
Virginia Tech	—	rv	21	16	14	21	19	rv	rv	18	22	24	19	17
UCF	rv	—	—	rv	rv	rv	rv	19	19	13	9	7	9	18
Denver	—	19	6	5	4	4	5	3 (2)	7	11	10	9	8	19
Charlotte	—	rv	rv	rv	rv	rv	rv	rv	rv	rv	19	14	14	20
Portland	rv	rv	18	20	15	13	11	7	9	7	11	15	21	21
West Virginia	—	rv	rv	—	—	—	—	—	—	rv	16	12	18	22
Oregon State	—	—	—	—	—	—	rv	—	rv	—	—	22	24	23
Michigan	21	—	rv	rv	21	19	14	16	18	rv	rv	rv	rv	24
Lipscomb	—	—	—	—	—	—	—	—	—	—	—	—	—	25
UC Irvine	—	rv	—	—	—	—	—	—	rv	21	rv	rv	rv	rv
Pacific	rv	17	rv	—	—	rv	rv	—	—	—	—	rv	rv	rv
Washington	24	3	23	9	16	rv	—	—	—	rv	23	25	17	rv
Colgate	25	21	13	rv	rv	24	20	rv	—	—	—	—	rv	rv
Connecticut	rv	18	—	—	rv	—	rv	20	20	15	20	rv	rv	rv
Syracuse	—	—	—	—	—	—	—	24	24	20	rv	rv	rv	rv
NC State	—	rv	8	18	18	12	17	rv	21	rv	—	—	—	rv
Rhode Island	—	—	rv	rv	rv	rv	rv	rv	23	rv	rv	rv	23	rv
New Hampshire	19	rv	rv	rv	rv	23	—	rv	rv	—	rv	rv	22	rv
Creighton	rv	20	rv	25	12	9	8	12	8	19	14	17	25	rv
Furman	—	—	—	—	—	—	—	—	—	—	—	—	—	rv
Wright State	—	—	—	—	—	rv	22	23	17	16	21	18	rv	rv
VCU	rv	—	—	—	—	rv	—	rv	rv	rv	rv	rv	rv	rv
High Point	—	—	—	—	—	rv	rv	rv	rv	rv	25	20	rv	—
UNC Wilmington	—	13	9	14	11	14	12	13	11	10	13	21	rv	—
UCLA	rv	8	rv	11	23	rv	—	21	22	—	—	rv	rv	—
SMU	8	rv	rv	—	—	—	—	—	—	—	—	rv	rv	—
Georgia State	—	—	—	—	—	—	—	—	—	—	—	—	rv	—
Old Dominion	rv	25	—	rv	20	rv	—	—	rv	rv	24	rv	rv	—
Loyola Maryland	—	—	—	—	—	—	—	—	—	rv	rv	23	—	—
Mercer	rv	—	—	—	—	—	—	—	—	—	rv	rv	—	—
Wisconsin	12	rv	—	—	—	—	rv	rv	—	—	—	rv	—	—
Vermont	—	rv	rv	24	rv	rv	rv	rv	—	rv	rv	—	—	—
Cornell	—	—	—	—	—	—	24	18	25	22	—	—	—	—
Missouri State	—	—	—	—	—	rv	rv	25	—	rv	—	—	—	—
SIU Edwardsville	—	—	—	rv	—	—	rv	rv	rv	rv	—	—	—	—
Seattle	22	—	—	—	—	rv	25	rv	rv	—	—	—	—	—
Fordham	16	15	11	12	25	25	21	rv	rv	—	—	—	—	—
Coastal Carolina	18	rv	19	21	24	18	rv	22	—	—	—	—	—	—
UC Davis	—	—	17	17	13	17	16	rv	—	—	—	—	—	—
UMass Lowell	rv	—	22	15	19	16	rv	—	—	—	—	—	—	—
Xavier	rv	rv	—	—	rv	22	—	—	—	—	—	—	—	—
Villanova	—	—	15	13	rv	—	—	—	—	—	—	—	—	—
San Francisco	rv	—	16	22	rv	—	—	—	—	—	—	—	—	—
Grand Canyon	rv	rv	24	—	—	—	—	—	—	—	—	—	—	—
Butler	9	11	rv	—	—	—	—	—	—	—	—	—	—	—
California	rv	14	rv	—	rv	—	—	—	—	—	—	—	—	—
Western Michigan	14	16	rv	—	—	—	—	—	—	—	—	—	—	—
Clemson	11	rv	rv	rv	rv	—	—	—	—	—	—	—	—	—
Dartmouth	23	22	—	—	—	—	—	—	—	—	—	—	—	—
Tulsa	—	23	—	—	—	—	—	—	—	—	—	—	—	—
Albany	rv	rv	—	—	—	—	—	—	—	—	—	—	—	—
William & Mary	rv	rv	—	—	—	—	—	—	—	—	—	—	—	—
FIU	20	—	—	—	—	—	—	—	—	—	—	—	—	—
Columbia	rv	—	—	—	—	—	—	—	—	—	—	—	—	—
Pittsburgh	rv	—	—	—	—	—	—	—	—	—	—	—	—	—
South Florida	rv	—	—	—	—	—	—	—	—	—	—	—	—	—
Cal State Fullerton	rv	—	—	—	—	—	—	—	—	—	—	—	—	—
Massachusetts	rv	—	—	—	—	—	—	—	—	—	—	—	—	—
