= 2018 NCAA Division I men's soccer season =

American college soccer season

- Number of teams: 206
- Hermann Trophy: Andrew Gutman (Indiana)
- Top goalscorer: 28 Goals; Andre Shinyashiki (Denver)

Statistics
- Biggest home win: Akron 10–0 Canisius (09/15)
- Biggest away win: Elon 8–1 Rutgers (09/02)
- Highest scoring: Akron 10–0 Canisius (09/15)
- Longest winning run: Season: 14 games Saint Mary's (08/24–10/26); Ongoing; 5 games Maryland (11/18–current)
- Longest unbeaten run: Season: 20 games Saint Mary's (18–0–2) (08/24–11/25); Ongoing; 24 games Saint Mary's (20–0–4) (10/27/2017–current)
- Longest winless run: 16 games Ohio State (0–14–2) (08/31-current)
- Longest losing run: 10 games Monmouth (09/26-current); Ohio State (09/25-current); Gonzaga (09/25/2018-current)
- Highest attendance: 11,075 UC Santa Barbara @ Cal Poly (09/30)

Tournament
- Duration: November 18–December 9, 2018

College Cup
- Date: December 9, 2018
- Site: Harder Stadium; Santa Barbara, California
- Champions: Maryland Terrapins
- Runners-up: Akron Zips

Seasons
- ← 2017 2019 →

The 2018 NCAA Division I men's soccer season was the 60th season of NCAA championship men's college soccer. The regular season began on August 24, 2018, and continued into the first weekend of November 2018. The season culminated with the four-team College Cup at Meredith Field at Harder Stadium in Santa Barbara, California, December 7–9, 2018. There were 206 teams in men's Division I competition. The Maryland Terrapins won their fourth NCAA title, defeating the Akron Zips 1–0.

== Changes from 2017 ==
=== Coaching changes ===
Program	Outgoing coach	Manner of departure	Date of vacancy	Incoming coach	Date of appointment
Dartmouth	Chad Riley	Hired by Notre Dame	January 4, 2018	Bo Oshoniyi	February 12, 2018
DePaul	Craig Blazer	Not retained	December 5, 2017	Mark Plotkin	December 21, 2017
East Tennessee State	Bo Oshoniyi	Hired by Dartmouth	February 12, 2018	David Casper	March 29, 2018
Gonzaga	Einar Thorarinsson	Retired	November 13, 2017	Paul Meehan	November 14, 2017
James Madison	Tom Foley	Resigned	August 3, 2018	Paul Zazenski	August 3, 2018
Notre Dame	Bobby Clark	Retired	November 28, 2017	Chad Riley	January 4, 2018
Ohio State	John Bluem	Retired	March 19, 2018	Brian Maisonneuve	April 23, 2018
Omaha	Jason Mims	Hired by Real Salt Lake	March 28, 2018	Bob Warming	April 2, 2018
Oregon State	Steve Simmons	Not retained	December 1, 2017	Terry Boss	December 28, 2017
Penn State	Bob Warming	Retired; Hired by Omaha	November 16, 2017	Jeff Cook	January 2, 2018
Saint Francis (PA)	Paulo Neto	Was not announced	After July 6, 2017	Frank Olszewski	January 17, 2018
Saint Louis	Mike McGinty	Contract not renewed	November 10, 2017	Kevin Kalish	January 20, 2018
San Diego	Seamus McFadden	Retired	March 15, 2017	Brian Quinn	January 1, 2018
Seton Hall	Gerson Echeverry	Resigned	November 6, 2017	Andreas Lindberg	December 11, 2017
Stetson	Kyle Gookins	Resigned	November 15, 2017	Cristian Neagu	January 4, 2018
Temple	David MacWilliams	Not retained	November 15, 2017	Brian Rowland	December 22, 2017
Wright State	Bryan Davis	Resigned	July 26, 2018	Jake Slemker	July 26, 2018

=== New programs ===
Mount St. Mary's University reinstated their men's soccer program, which had been dormant since the end of the 2012 season, for the 2018 season.

The California Baptist Lancers began the transition from Division II to Division I and the Western Athletic Conference in 2018–19.

The UC San Diego Tritons will begin the transition from Division II to Division I and will join the Big West Conference in 2020–21.

The Merrimack Warriors will begin the transition from Division II to Division I and will join the Northeast Conference in 2019–20.

=== Discontinued programs ===
Hartwick College, the only Division III school competing in Division I men's soccer for some years moved to Division III with the school's other sports.

Despite the program's many successes, the University of New Mexico's Board of Regents, for economic reasons, voted to discontinue the men's soccer program, along with three other sports teams, after the 2018 season.

=== Conference realignment ===
School	Previous Conference	New Conference
Mount St. Mary's	Northeast Conference, but inactive since 2012	Northeast Conference
California Baptist	Pacific West Conference (NCAA Division II)	Western Athletic Conference
USC Upstate	Atlantic Sun Conference	Big South Conference
Belmont	Horizon League	Southern Conference
Hartwick	Sun Belt Conference affiliate member	Empire 8 (NCAA Division III)
Liberty	Big South Conference	Atlantic Sun Conference

NOTE 1: The Cal State Bakersfield Roadrunners will move from the Western Athletic Conference to the Big West Conference on July 1, 2020.

NOTE 2: The team formerly known as the Fort Wayne Mastodons officially changed its athletic identity to the Purdue Fort Wayne Mastodons on June 18, 2018, shortly before the creation of Purdue University Fort Wayne (PFW). Previously, the PFW athletic program represented Indiana University – Purdue University Fort Wayne (IPFW), but the Indiana University and Purdue University systems agreed to dissolve IPFW on July 1, 2018, with each system establishing a separate Fort Wayne campus. The IPFW athletic program transferred to PFW, representing only that institution, and remains a member of Division I and the Summit League.

NOTE 3: After six years of divisional play, with home-and-home series within the divisions, the Big West Conference teams will be playing a single, eight-team, seven game schedule. This move comes two years before Cal State Bakersfield moves in to make the Big West a nine team league.

NOTE 4: Central Arkansas announced on September 6 that its men's soccer program would leave its associate membership in the Missouri Valley Conference after the 2018 season and join the Sun Belt Conference as an Associate Member.

== Season overview ==
=== Pre-season polls ===
United Soccer Coaches
Rank	Team
1	Stanford
2	Indiana
3	North Carolina
4	Akron
5	Wake Forest
6	Louisville
7	Michigan State
8	SMU
9	Butler
10	Duke
11	Clemson
12	Wisconsin
13	Georgetown
14	Western Michigan
15	Virginia
16	Fordham
17	Notre Dame
18	Coastal Carolina
19	New Hampshire
20	FIU
21	Michigan
22	Seattle
23	Dartmouth
24	Washington
25	Colgate

College Soccer News
Rank	Team
1	Stanford
2	Indiana
3	North Carolina
4	Michigan State
5	Louisville
6	Georgetown
7	Akron
8	Wake Forest
9	Duke
10	SMU
11	Butler
12	Clemson
13	FIU
14	Western Michigan
15	Virginia
16	Fordham
17	Michigan
18	Seattle
19	Washington
20	Notre Dame
21	Colgate
22	Dartmouth
23	Maryland
24	Coastal Carolina
25	New Hampshire
26	Wisconsin
27	Pacific
28	UCLA
29	NC State
30t	William & Mary
30t	Cal State Fullerton

Soccer America
Rank	Team
1	Indiana
2	North Carolina
3	Stanford
4	Michigan State
5	Akron
6	Wake Forest
7	SMU
8	Louisville
9	Clemson
10	Georgetown
11	Michigan
12	Western Michigan
13	Butler
14	Duke
15	Washington
16	Maryland
17	Virginia
18	UCLA
19	Seattle
20	FIU
21	Notre Dame
22	Portland
23	NC State
24	Fordham
25	Coastal Carolina

Top Drawer Soccer
Rank	Team
1	Stanford
2	Akron
3	Wake Forest
4	North Carolina
5	Indiana
6	SMU
7	Louisville
8	Western Michigan
9	Michigan State
10	Butler
11	Denver
12	Clemson
13	Duke
14	Georgetown
15	Michigan
16	Virginia
17	UCLA
18	Wisconsin
19	Coastal Carolina
20	Notre Dame
21	Maryland
22	Portland
23	NC State
24	Seattle
25	FIU

Hero Sports
Rank	Team
1	Stanford
2	Indiana
3	Wake Forest
4	North Carolina
5	Akron
6	SMU
7	Louisville
8	Clemson
9	Duke
10	Michigan State
11	Virginia
12	FIU
13	Wisconsin
14	Western Michigan
15	Columbia
16	Dartmouth
17	Georgetown
19	Notre Dame
19	VCU
20	Butler
21	New Hampshire
22	Maryland
23	UMass
24	William & Mary
25	Coastal Carolina
26	UCF
27	Pacific
28	Michigan
29	Air Force
30	Fordham

== Regular season ==
The regular season began on August 24, 2018, and ended in early November 2018.

=== Headlines ===
- October 3 – Long Island University announced that its two current athletic programs—the Division I LIU Brooklyn Blackbirds and the Division II LIU Post Pioneers—would merge into a single Division I athletic program under the LIU name after the 2018–19 school year. The unified program, which will maintain LIU Brooklyn's Division I and Northeast Conference memberships, will announce a new nickname at a later date. With both campuses sponsoring men's soccer, the two teams will become a single LIU team based at the Post campus in Nassau County, New York in the 2019 season.

=== #1 ===
Weekly United Soccer Coaches #1 ranked team
Date	Team	Date	Team	Date	Team	Date	Team
August 8 (preseason)	**Stanford**	None until after season starts		August 28	**Wake Forest**	September 4	**Wake Forest**
September 11	**Wake Forest**	September 18	**Wake Forest**	September 25	**Wake Forest**	October 2	**Wake Forest**
October 9	**North Carolina**	October 16	**Wake Forest**	October 23	**Wake Forest**	October 30	**Wake Forest**
November 6	**Wake Forest**	November 13	**Indiana**	None until after tournament		December 11	**Maryland**

=== Conference standings ===
2018 America East Conference men's soccer standings
	Conf.					Overall
Team	W		L		T	W		L		T
Stony Brook	5	–	1	–	1	8	–	6	–	3
New Hampshire ‡	4	–	2	–	1	12	–	4	–	2
Vermont	4	–	3	–	0	11	–	7	–	1
UMass Lowell	4	–	3	–	0	10	–	6	–	2
UMBC	3	–	3	–	1	10	–	6	–	4
Albany	3	–	4	–	0	8	–	10	–	0
Binghamton	2	–	5	–	0	3	–	12	–	2
Hartford	1	–	5	–	1	1	–	10	–	5
‡ – 2018 Am. East Tournament champion + – Invited to the 2018 NCAA tournament; As of December 11, 2018; Rankings from United Soccer Coaches

2018 American Athletic Conference men's soccer standings
	Conf.					Overall
Team	W		L		T	W		L		T
No. 18 UCF +	5	–	1	–	1	13	–	3	–	3
SMU ‡+	5	–	1	–	1	10	–	5	–	3
South Florida	4	–	1	–	2	7	–	8	–	2
Connecticut +	3	–	2	–	2	12	–	6	–	2
Memphis	2	–	4	–	1	8	–	7	–	4
Temple	2	–	4	–	1	5	–	10	–	4
Tulsa	2	–	5	–	0	6	–	9	–	2
Cincinnati	1	–	6	–	0	3	–	14	–	1
‡ – 2018 American Tournament champion + – Invited to the 2018 NCAA Division I Men's Soccer Championship; As of December 11, 2018; Rankings from United Soccer Coaches

2018 Atlantic 10 Conference men's soccer standings
	Conf.					Overall
Team	W		L		T	W		L		T
VCU	6	–	1	–	1	10	–	6	–	2
Davidson	5	–	2	–	1	9	–	7	–	2
Rhode Island ‡	5	–	3	–	0	15	–	5	–	0
George Mason	5	–	3	–	0	9	–	8	–	0
Saint Louis	3	–	1	–	4	6	–	4	–	7
Fordham	4	–	3	–	1	8	–	5	–	4
Dayton	4	–	3	–	1	9	–	6	–	4
Saint Joseph's	2	–	3	–	3	8	–	7	–	3
UMass	3	–	5	–	0	7	–	8	–	3
St. Bonaventure	3	–	5	–	0	7	–	9	–	1
Duquesne	2	–	4	–	2	4	–	9	–	3
George Washington	1	–	5	–	2	5	–	9	–	3
LaSalle	0	–	5	–	2	3	–	11	–	3
‡ – 2018 Atlantic 10 Tournament champion + – Invited to the 2018 NCAA Division I Men's Soccer Championship; As of December 11, 2018; Rankings from United Soccer Coaches

2018 ACC men's soccer standings
	Conf.					Overall
Team	W		L		T	W		L		T
Atlantic
No. 6 Wake Forest +	7	–	1	–	0	18	–	3	–	0
No. 16 Louisville ‡	4	–	2	–	2	11	–	5	–	3
NC State +	2	–	4	–	2	10	–	7	–	3
Boston College	2	–	5	–	1	4	–	8	–	4
Syracuse +	1	–	4	–	3	7	–	7	–	4
Clemson	2	–	6	–	0	7	–	9	–	1
Coastal
No. 14 North Carolina +	6	–	1	–	0	14	–	4	–	1
No. 11 Duke +	5	–	3	–	0	11	–	7	–	2
No. 8 Notre Dame +	4	–	3	–	1	11	–	7	–	3
No. 15 Virginia +	3	–	2	–	2	10	–	4	–	3
No. 17 Virginia Tech +	3	–	4	–	1	11	–	7	–	3
Pittsburgh	2	–	6	–	0	8	–	10	–	1
‡ – 2018 ACC Tournament champion + – Invited to the 2018 NCAA Division I Men's Soccer Championship; As of December 11, 2018; Rankings from United Soccer Coaches; Source:The ACC

2018 ASUN Conference men's soccer standings
	Conf.					Overall
Team	W		L		T	W		L		T
No. 25 Lipscomb ‡	5	–	1	–	0	10	–	10	–	1
Florida Gulf Coast	5	–	1	–	0	9	–	5	–	2
North Florida	3	–	3	–	0	5	–	11	–	0
Jacksonville	3	–	3	–	0	5	–	13	–	0
Liberty	2	–	3	–	1	7	–	7	–	1
Stetson	1	–	4	–	1	7	–	10	–	2
NJIT	1	–	5	–	0	6	–	11	–	0
‡ – 2018 ASUN tournament champion + – Invited to the 2018 NCAA Division I Men's Soccer Championship; As of December 11, 2018; Rankings from United Soccer Coaches

2018 Big East Conference men's soccer standings
	Conf.					Overall
Team	W		L		T	W		L		T
Creighton	7	–	1	–	1	11	–	4	–	3
No. 13 Georgetown ‡	6	–	2	–	1	13	–	5	–	3
Providence	6	–	2	–	1	10	–	7	–	2
Marquette	5	–	3	–	1	7	–	9	–	3
Xavier	4	–	4	–	1	6	–	7	–	6
St. John's	3	–	3	–	3	7	–	8	–	3
DePaul	2	–	5	–	2	5	–	9	–	3
Villanova	2	–	6	–	1	7	–	8	–	2
Seton Hall	2	–	6	–	1	6	–	7	–	2
Butler	2	–	7	–	0	4	–	12	–	2
‡ – 2018 Big East Tournament champion + – Invited to the 2018 NCAA Division I Men's Soccer Championship; As of December 11, 2018; Rankings from United Soccer Coaches

2018 Big South Conference men's soccer standings
	Conf.					Overall
Team	W		L		T	W		L		T
High Point +	7	–	0	–	1	13	–	3	–	2
Radford	5	–	3	–	0	7	–	9	–	0
Presbyterian	5	–	3	–	0	8	–	12	–	0
Campbell ‡	4	–	3	–	1	9	–	9	–	3
Gardner–Webb	4	–	4	–	0	4	–	11	–	1
Longwood	3	–	4	–	1	5	–	13	–	1
USC Upstate	3	–	4	–	1	3	–	12	–	1
Winthrop	3	–	5	–	0	4	–	11	–	0
UNC Asheville	0	–	8	–	0	2	–	13	–	2
‡ – 2018 Big South Tournament champion + – Invited to the 2018 NCAA Division I Men's Soccer Championship; As of November 29, 2018; Rankings from United Soccer Coaches

2018 Big Ten Conference men's soccer standings
	Conf.					Overall
Team	W		L		T	W		L		T
No. 3 Indiana ‡	8	–	0	–	0	20	–	3	–	1
Wisconsin	6	–	2	–	0	10	–	6	–	2
No. 4 Michigan State +	4	–	2	–	2	14	–	5	–	4
No. 24 Michigan +	4	–	2	–	2	12	–	5	–	4
No. 1 Maryland +	4	–	4	–	0	12	–	6	–	4
Penn State	3	–	3	–	2	6	–	9	–	2
Rutgers	2	–	6	–	0	4	–	13	–	1
Northwestern	0	–	5	–	3	6	–	9	–	5
Ohio State	0	–	7	–	1	1	–	15	–	2
$ – Conference champion; As of December 11, 2018; Rankings from United Soccer Coaches Poll; Source:The Big Ten Conference

2018 Big West Conference men's soccer standings
	Conf.					Overall
Team	W		L		T	W		L		T
UC Irvine +	5	–	1	–	1	11	–	6	–	4
UC Santa Barbara	4	–	2	–	1	10	–	6	–	2
UC Riverside ‡	4	–	2	–	1	7	–	10	–	3
UC Davis	3	–	3	–	1	11	–	4	–	5
CSU Northridge	3	–	3	–	1	9	–	8	–	1
CSU Fullerton	2	–	3	–	2	7	–	6	–	8
Sacramento State	2	–	5	–	0	4	–	11	–	2
Cal Poly	1	–	5	–	1	5	–	9	–	2
‡ – 2018 Big West Tournament champion + – Invited to the 2018 NCAA Division I Men's Soccer Championship; As of November 29, 2018; Rankings from United Soccer Coaches

2018 Colonial Athletic Association men's soccer standings
	Conf.					Overall
Team	W		L		T	W		L		T
No. 10 James Madison ‡	6	–	2	–	0	15	–	5	–	3
UNC Wilmington +	5	–	1	–	2	12	–	5	–	3
Hofstra	5	–	2	–	1	10	–	6	–	5
Delaware	4	–	3	–	1	5	–	11	–	1
William & Mary	3	–	3	–	2	6	–	10	–	2
Northeastern	3	–	4	–	1	6	–	9	–	1
Drexel	2	–	5	–	1	9	–	5	–	3
Elon	2	–	5	–	1	5	–	8	–	2
Charleston	1	–	6	–	1	5	–	10	–	2
‡ – 2018 CAA Tournament champion + – Invited to the 2018 NCAA Division I Men's Soccer Championship; As of December 1, 2018; Rankings from United Soccer Coaches

2018 Conference USA men's soccer standings
	Conf.					Overall
Team	W		L		T	W		L		T
No. 5 Kentucky ‡	7	–	1	–	0	18	–	2	–	1
No. 20 Charlotte +	6	–	2	–	0	14	–	5	–	2
Old Dominion	6	–	2	–	0	11	–	5	–	2
FIU	5	–	3	–	0	7	–	10	–	0
Marshall	3	–	3	–	2	8	–	9	–	3
UAB	2	–	5	–	1	6	–	9	–	3
New Mexico	2	–	5	–	1	4	–	12	–	1
South Carolina	2	–	6	–	0	7	–	10	–	0
Florida Atlantic	1	–	7	–	0	2	–	13	–	0
‡ – 2018 CUSA Tournament champion + – Invited to the 2018 NCAA Division I Men's Soccer Championship; As of December 11, 2018; Rankings from United Soccer Coaches

2018 Horizon League men's soccer standings
	Conf.					Overall
Team	W		L		T	W		L		T
Wright State	6	–	1	–	1	13	–	3	–	3
UIC ‡	5	–	2	–	1	12	–	6	–	2
Oakland	5	–	3	–	0	9	–	7	–	3
Green Bay	4	–	3	–	1	8	–	6	–	2
IUPUI	4	–	3	–	1	5	–	10	–	4
Milwaukee	3	–	4	–	1	9	–	7	–	3
Northern Kentucky	3	–	5	–	0	10	–	7	–	0
Cleveland State	1	–	4	–	3	4	–	8	–	3
Detroit Mercy	0	–	6	–	2	1	–	14	–	3
‡ – 2018 Horizon Tournament champion + – Invited to the 2018 NCAA Division I Men's Soccer Championship; As of November 30, 2018; Rankings from United Soccer Coaches

2018 Ivy League men's soccer standings
	Conf.					Overall
Team	W		L		T	W		L		T
Princeton †	5	–	1	–	1	10	–	5	–	3
Columbia	5	–	2	–	0	10	–	5	–	1
Dartmouth	4	–	1	–	2	7	–	5	–	5
Cornell	4	–	3	–	0	11	–	6	–	0
Yale	2	–	3	–	2	7	–	6	–	3
Penn	2	–	4	–	1	5	–	5	–	6
Brown	2	–	5	–	0	8	–	8	–	1
Harvard	1	–	6	–	0	3	–	13	–	0
† – Conference champion + – Invited to the 2018 NCAA Division I Men's Soccer Championship; As of November 30, 2018; Rankings from United Soccer Coaches

2018 Metro Atlantic Athletic Conference men's soccer standings
	Conf.					Overall
Team	W		L		T	W		L		T
Fairfield	8	–	0	–	2	11	–	5	–	2
Quinnipiac	8	–	1	–	1	10	–	6	–	3
Marist	6	–	2	–	2	8	–	5	–	5
Iona	6	–	3	–	1	10	–	6	–	2
Rider ‡	6	–	4	–	0	10	–	10	–	1
Saint Peter's	5	–	4	–	1	8	–	9	–	2
Manhattan	5	–	5	–	0	12	–	6	–	0
Siena	4	–	6	–	0	5	–	10	–	3
Canisius	2	–	7	–	1	4	–	10	–	2
Niagara	1	–	9	–	0	3	–	15	–	0
Monmouth	0	–	10	–	0	2	–	14	–	1
‡ – 2018 MAAC Tournament champion + – Invited to the 2018 NCAA Division I Men's Soccer Championship; As of November 30, 2018; Rankings from United Soccer Coaches

2018 Mid-American Conference men's soccer standings
	Conf.					Overall
Team	W		L		T	W		L		T
No. 22 West Virginia +	5	–	0	–	0	14	–	7	–	0
Bowling Green	2	–	1	–	2	6	–	7	–	4
Western Michigan	1	–	1	–	2	11	–	6	–	3
No. 2 Akron ‡	1	–	2	–	1	15	–	7	–	2
SIU Edwardsville	1	–	3	–	1	9	–	5	–	4
Northern Illinois	1	–	4	–	0	8	–	9	–	1
‡ – 2018 MAC Tournament champion + – Invited to the 2018 NCAA Division I Men's Soccer Championship; As of December 11, 2018; Rankings from United Soccer Coaches

2018 Missouri Valley Conference men's soccer standings
	Conf.					Overall
Team	W		L		T	W		L		T
Central Arkansas ‡	4	–	1	–	1	8	–	6	–	4
Loyola Chicago	3	–	1	–	2	10	–	7	–	2
Valparaiso	2	–	1	–	3	5	–	8	–	4
Missouri State	2	–	2	–	2	9	–	2	–	6
Evansville	2	–	2	–	2	4	–	8	–	7
Drake	2	–	3	–	1	7	–	7	–	3
Bradley	1	–	5	–	0	8	–	5	–	4
‡ – 2018 MVC Tournament champion + – Invited to the 2018 NCAA Division I Men's Soccer Championship; As of November 30, 2018; Rankings from United Soccer Coaches

2018 Northeast Conference men's soccer standings
	Conf.					Overall
Team	W		L		T	W		L		T
LIU Brooklyn ‡	6	–	2	–	0	13	–	6	–	1
Saint Francis (PA)	5	–	1	–	2	9	–	5	–	3
Fairleigh Dickinson	4	–	2	–	2	7	–	7	–	4
Bryant	4	–	2	–	2	5	–	9	–	3
St. Francis Brooklyn	4	–	4	–	0	7	–	10	–	0
Robert Morris	4	–	4	–	0	6	–	10	–	1
Sacred Heart	3	–	5	–	0	4	–	12	–	1
Mount St. Mary's	1	–	5	–	2	2	–	10	–	4
Central Connecticut	1	–	7	–	0	1	–	13	–	1
‡ – 2018 NEC Tournament champion + – Invited to the 2018 NCAA Division I Men's Soccer Championship; As of November 30, 2018; Rankings from United Soccer Coaches

2018 Pac-12 Conference men's soccer standings
	Conf.					Overall
Team	W		L		T	W		L		T
No. 7 Stanford †	7	–	2	–	1	12	–	4	–	5
No. 23 Oregon State +	6	–	3	–	1	11	–	6	–	3
Washington +	6	–	4	–	0	12	–	7	–	1
UCLA +	5	–	5	–	0	10	–	9	–	0
California	3	–	7	–	0	7	–	9	–	2
San Diego State	2	–	8	–	0	7	–	10	–	1
† – Conference champion + – Invited to the 2018 NCAA Division I Men's Soccer Championship; As of December 11, 2018; Rankings from United Soccer Coaches

2018 Patriot League men's soccer standings
	Conf.					Overall
Team	W		L		T	W		L		T
Loyola Maryland	7	–	1	–	1	12	–	4	–	1
Lehigh	6	–	3	–	0	9	–	8	–	2
Colgate ‡	5	–	2	–	2	13	–	5	–	5
Boston U.	4	–	4	–	1	5	–	10	–	4
American	3	–	3	–	3	4	–	9	–	5
Army	4	–	5	–	0	8	–	10	–	2
Navy	4	–	5	–	0	5	–	11	–	1
Bucknell	3	–	5	–	1	6	–	8	–	3
Holy Cross	2	–	6	–	1	3	–	10	–	4
Lafayette	1	–	5	–	3	5	–	8	–	4
‡-Tournament Champion +-Invited to the NCAA Division I Men's Soccer Championship; As of November 30, 2018; Rankings from United Soccer Coaches

2018 Southern Conference men's soccer standings
	Conf.					Overall
Team	W		L		T	W		L		T
Mercer	5	–	1	–	0	12	–	4	–	2
East Tenn. State	4	–	1	–	1	9	–	7	–	1
Furman ‡	4	–	2	–	0	13	–	7	–	2
Wofford	3	–	3	–	0	5	–	11	–	1
UNC Greensboro	2	–	2	–	2	8	–	9	–	2
Belmont	1	–	4	–	1	4	–	12	–	2
VMI	0	–	6	–	0	1	–	16	–	1
‡-2018 SoCon Tournament Champion +-Invited to the 2018 NCAA Division I Men's Soccer Championship; As of November 30, 2018; Rankings from United Soccer Coaches

2018 Summit League men's soccer standings
	Conf.					Overall
Team	W		L		T	W		L		T
No. 19 Denver ‡	4	–	0	–	1	15	–	4	–	2
Omaha	4	–	1	–	0	7	–	8	–	1
Purdue Fort Wayne	2	–	3	–	0	10	–	8	–	1
Eastern Illinois	1	–	2	–	2	3	–	11	–	4
Western Illinois	1	–	3	–	1	4	–	10	–	3
Oral Roberts	0	–	3	–	2	6	–	7	–	3
‡-Tournament Champion +-Invited to the 2018 NCAA Division I Men's Soccer Championship; As of December 11, 2018; Rankings from United Soccer Coaches

2018 Sun Belt Conference men's soccer standings
	Conf.					Overall
Team	W		L		T	W		L		T
Georgia State ‡	2	–	0	–	2	11	–	6	–	3
Appalachian State	2	–	1	–	1	8	–	6	–	3
Georgia Southern	2	–	1	–	1	7	–	7	–	3
Coastal Carolina	2	–	2	–	0	10	–	6	–	0
Howard	0	–	4	–	0	2	–	10	–	3
‡-Sun Belt Tournament Champion +-Invited to the 2018 NCAA Division I Men's Soccer Championship; As of November 30, 2018; Rankings from United Soccer Coaches

2018 West Coast Conference men's soccer standings
	Conf.					Overall
Team	W		L		T	W		L		T
No. 9 Saint Mary's †	6	–	0	–	1	18	–	0	–	2
Pacific +	5	–	2	–	0	12	–	5	–	2
San Francisco	4	–	3	–	0	6	–	10	–	1
San Diego	3	–	1	–	3	7	–	7	–	5
No. 21 Portland +	3	–	3	–	1	12	–	4	–	3
Loyola Marymount	3	–	4	–	0	6	–	12	–	0
Santa Clara	1	–	5	–	1	5	–	10	–	2
Gonzaga	0	–	7	–	0	2	–	14	–	2
†-Conference champion + - Invited to the NCAA Division I Men's Soccer Championship; As of December 11, 2018; Rankings from United Soccer Coaches

2018 Western Athletic Conference men's soccer standings
	Conf.					Overall
Team	W		L		T	W		L		T
No. 12 Air Force +	8	–	2	–	0	17	–	5	–	0
UTRGV	8	–	3	–	0	14	–	6	–	0
Seattle	7	–	4	–	0	13	–	6	–	1
Grand Canyon ‡	6	–	4	–	0	12	–	8	–	1
Utah Valley	6	–	4	–	0	9	–	9	–	0
UNLV	5	–	5	–	1	10	–	10	–	1
San Jose State	5	–	5	–	1	8	–	10	–	3
Cal Baptist ^{#}	5	–	6	–	0	9	–	9	–	1
UMKC	4	–	7	–	0	5	–	12	–	0
Houston Baptist	3	–	6	–	1	5	–	8	–	3
Cal St. Bakersfield	3	–	7	–	1	5	–	12	–	1
Incarnate Word	2	–	9	–	0	2	–	14	–	1
‡-Tournament Champion + - Invited to the NCAA Division I Men's Soccer Championship ^{#}-Ineligible (In transition); As of December 11, 2018; Rankings from United Soccer Coaches

=== Major upsets ===
In this list, a "major upset" is defined as a game won by a team ranked 10 or more spots lower or an unranked team that defeats a team ranked #15 or higher.

All rankings are from the United Soccer Coaches Poll.

Date	Winner	Score	Loser
08/24	**Providence**	2–1 ^{(2ot)}	@ #8 SMU
08/24	@ **Creighton**	2–0	#11 Clemson
08/24	@ **Grand Canyon**	2–0	#12 Wisconsin
08/27	**NC State**	2–0	@ #4 Akron
08/27	**Drake**	2–1	@ #9 Butler
08/27	@ **DePaul**	1–0	#14 Western Michigan
09/01	**San Francisco**	1–0	@ #8 UCLA
09/04	@ **Kentucky**	3–0	#7 Louisville
09/07	**Fairfield**	2–1	@ #9 UNC Wilmington
09/07	@ **Seattle**	2–1	#14 Akron
09/14	@ #20 **Portland**	1–0	#9 Washington
09/14	@ **Stanford**	1–0	#15 UMass Lowell
09/18	**Georgetown**	1–0	@ #9 Duke
09/21	@ **Rutgers**	2–1	#5 Michigan State
09/25	@ **Pitt**	3–1	#12 NC State
09/30	**Wisconsin**	1–0	@ #5 Michigan State
10/05	@ **Syracuse**	2–0	#1 Wake Forest
10/05	@ **Cal State Bakersfield**	1–0	#7 Air Force
10/07	@ **FIU**	3–2	#4 Kentucky
10/09	**Akron**	2–1	@ #8 Michigan State
10/11	@ **Oregon State**	1–0	#10 Stanford
10/12	@ **NC State**	1–0	#1 North Carolina
10/16	@ **Maryland**	1–0	#7 Denver
10/16	@ **Akron**	1–0	#8 Creighton
10/16	**Lipscomb**	3–2	@ #10 Louisville
10/16	**High Point**	1–0	@ #14 Duke
10/24	**Coastal Carolina**	2–1	@ #10 UNC Wilmington
10/26	@ **San Francisco**	2–1	#7 Portland
10/28	@ **Grand Canyon**	1–0	#8 Air Force
10/31	**Pitt**	2–0	@ #7 Virginia
10/31	**Georgetown**	2–1^{(ot)}	@ #14 Creighton
11/03	@ **Pacific**	3–2	#11 Portland
11/08	**California**	1–0	@ #6 Stanford
11/09	**Marshall**	2–1	#3 Kentucky (@ Charlotte)
11/09	**Akron**	3–1	@ #12 West Virginia
11/09	**Grand Canyon**	1–0	#13 Air Force (@ Seattle)

=== Early season tournaments ===
Several universities hosted early season soccer tournaments.

Name	Dates	Stadium	City	No. teams	Champion
Carolina Nike Classic	August 24–26	UNCG Soccer Stadium	Greensboro, NC	4	Wake Forest (2–0)
Fairfield Inn by Marriot JMU Invitational		University Park	Harrisonburg, VA	4	Virginia Tech (2–0)
John Rennie Nike Invitational	August 24–26	Koskinen Stadium	Durham, NC	4	Duke (2–0)
HBU Invitational	August 24–26	Sorrels Field	Houston, TX	4	Houston Baptist (1–0–1)
Mike Berticelli Memorial Tournament		Alumni Stadium	Notre Dame, IN	4	
Mike Gibbs Memorial Tournament		Hodges Stadium	Jacksonville, FL	4	
Nike/Aaron Olitsky Memorial Soccer Classic		Patriots Point Athletics Complex	Mount Pleasant, SC	4	
VCU Tournament	August 24–26	ODU Soccer Complex	Norfolk, VA	4	Georgia Southern (1–0–1) Old Dominion (1–0–1)
Wolstein Classic	August 24–26	Jesse Owens Memorial Stadium	Columbus, OH	4	Dayton (1–0–1)
Adidas/IU Credit Union Classic	August 31–Sept 2	Bill Armstrong Stadium	Bloomington, IN	4	Indiana (2–0)
UTRGV Invitational	August 31–Sept 2	UTRGV Soccer and Track & Field Complex	Edinburg, TX	4	Purdue Fort Wayne (2–0)
Chicago Classic		Loyola Soccer Park & Wish Field	Chicago, IL	4	
The Grange & Ashwill Memorial Invitational		UNM Soccer Complex	Albuquerque, NM	4	
The Hotels at Grand Prairie Classic		Shea Stadium	Peoria, IL	4	
Johann Memorial Classic		Peter Johann Memorial Field	Las Vegas, NV	4	
The Courtyard by Marriott; Central San Diego Tournament		SDSU Sports Deck	San Diego, CA	4	
NIU/Adidas Invitational		NIU Soccer and Track & Field Complex	DeKalb, IL	4	
ProRehab Aces Soccer Classic		Arad McCutchan Stadium	Evansville, IN	4	
R.I. Capital City Classic		Chapey Field at Anderson Stadium	Providence, RI	4	
The TLC Plumbing and Utility Invitational		UNM Soccer Complex	Albuquerque, NM	4	
UAB Soccer For A Cure Classic		BBVA Compass Field	Birmingham, AL	4	
UNCW Courtyard by Marriott; Wilmington-Wrightsville Beach Classic		UNCW Soccer Stadium	Wilmington, NC	4	
ODU Soccer Classic	August 31–Sept 2	ODU Soccer Complex	Norfolk, VA	4	VCU (2–0)

=== TopDrawer Soccer Team of the week ===
- **Bold** denotes TDS player of the week.

Team of the week
Week	Goalkeeper	Defenders	Midfielders	Forwards	Bench
1	(United States) Lapsley (UC Davis)	(Canada) Montgomery (Charlotte) (United States) Ward (Creighton) (United States) Holt (UCLA)	(Germany) Mehlich (UNLV) (United States) Parish (Washington) (United States) Lapa (Wake Forest)	(Scotland) Todd (UIC) (Nigeria) Egbo (Akron) (Brazil) Shinyashiki (Denver) (United States) **Clemmensen** (UC Santa Barbara)	(United States) Gonzalez (UNLV) (United States) McMaster (Wake Forest) (Italy) Proch (Duke) (United States) Hundley (UCLA) (New Zealand) Bell (Virginia) (United States) Maher (Indiana) (United States) Michel (Portland) (United States) Holbrook (Appalachian State)
2	(United States) Weekes (Portland)				
3	(United States) Hague (Michigan State)				
4	(United States) Nelson (Xavier)				
5	(United States) Adachi (Seattle U)				
6	(United States) Panicco (Charlotte)				
7	(United States) Creek (Missouri State)	(United States) Devoss (Denver) (United States) Vasquez (UCLA) (Denmark) Nielsen (Michigan State)	(United States) **Haji** (VCU) (Germany) Klosterhalfen (Old Dominion) (United States) Quezada (UC Irvine) (Sweden) Hagman (Syracuse)	(United States) Luchini (Lehigh) (United States) Jennings (UCF) (United States) Rudel (Saint Mary's)	
8	(Spain) Fernández (Oregon State)	(United States) Hogan (Charlotte) (United States) Hauser-Ramsey (Connecticut) (United States) Gutman (Indiana)	(United States) Pearson (VCU) (Spain) **Loera** (NC State) (Serbia) Rokvić (Wright State) (United States) Guerra (Furman)	(Italy) Proch (Duke) (Scotland) Todd (UIC) (United States) Goodrum (UNC Wilmington)	(Tanzania) Amanda (Oregon State) (Germany) Krapf (NC State) (United States) Pitaczyc (West Virginia) (England) Willis (Northern Kentucky) (Nigeria) Dike (Virginia) (United States) Maciejewski (Bowling Green) (Spain) Ferriol (James Madison) (United States) Rafanello (Penn State) (Spain) Goni (Cal State Fullerton) (United States) Rudel (Saint Mary's) (United States) Fawole (Loyola (MD)) (United States) Cuello (SMU) (Croatia) Prpa (Marquette)
9	(Canada) St. Clair (Maryland)	(Spain) Andres-Llop (West Virginia) (England) Cover (Oregon State) (Ghana) Tetteh (High Point)	(United States) Skahan (North Carolina) (United States) Elmedkhar (Kentucky) (United States) Swartz (Indiana) (United States) Strickler (Virginia Tech)	(Mexico) **Canales** (UC Irvine) (United States) Jennings (UCF) (United States) Dewing (Air Force	(United States) Riley (Pacific) (Nigeria) Achara (Georgetown) (United States) Hundley (UCLA) (United States) Williams (Kentucky) (United States) Beason (Stanford) (Sweden) Anshelm (James Madison) (Croatia) Prpa (Marquette)

== Postseason ==
=== Conference winners and tournaments ===
Conference	Regular season winner	Conference tournament	Tournament venue (city)	Tournament champion
America East	Stony Brook	2018 America East Men's Soccer Tournament	Higher seeds host all games at campus sites	New Hampshire
American	UCF	2018 American Athletic Conference Men's Soccer Tournament	UCF Soccer and Track Stadium (Orlando, FL)	SMU
ACC	A-Wake Forest; C-North Carolina ^{†}	2018 ACC Men's Soccer Tournament	Higher seeds host at campus sites until final @ Sahlen's Stadium (Cary, NC)	Louisville
Atlantic Sun	Lipscomb & Florida Gulf Coast	2018 Atlantic Sun Men's Soccer Tournament	#1 & #2 seeds host quarter- & semifinals High remaining seed hosts Final	Lipscomb
Atlantic 10	VCU	2018 Atlantic 10 Men's Soccer Tournament	Higher seeds host quarterfinals at campus sites. Semifinals & Final @ Hermann Stadium (St. Louis, MO)	Rhode Island
Big East	Creighton	2018 Big East Conference Men's Soccer Tournament	Higher seeds host all games at campus sites	Georgetown
Big South	High Point	2018 Big South Conference Men's Soccer Tournament	Higher seeds host all games at campus sites	Campbell
Big Ten	Indiana	2018 Big Ten Conference Men's Soccer Tournament	Higher seeds host 1st round & quarterfinals at campus sites. Semifinals & Final @ Grand Park (Westfield, IN)	Indiana
Big West	UC Irvine	2018 Big West Conference Men's Soccer Tournament	Higher seeds host all games at campus sites	UC Riverside
Colonial	James Madison	2018 CAA Men's Soccer Tournament	Higher seeds host quarterfinals at campus sites. Semifinals & Final @ regular season champion	James Madison
Conference USA	Kentucky	2018 Conference USA Men's Soccer Tournament	Transamerica Field (Charlotte, NC)	Kentucky
Horizon	Wright State	2018 Horizon League Men's Soccer Tournament	Higher seeds host quarterfinals at campus sites. Semifinals & Final @ regular season champion	UIC
Ivy	Princeton	No tournament---regular season champion receives the conference's automatic bid		
MAAC	Fairfield	2018 MAAC Men's Soccer Tournament	Higher seeds host all games at campus sites	Rider
Mid-American	West Virginia	2018 MAC Men's Soccer Tournament	Higher seeds host quarterfinals at campus sites. Semifinals & Final @ regular season champion	Akron
Missouri Valley	Central Arkansas	2018 Missouri Valley Conference Men's Soccer Tournament	Arad McCutchan Stadium (Evansville, IN)	Central Arkansas
Northeast	LIU Brooklyn	2018 Northeast Conference Men's Soccer Tournament	Semifinals & Final only tournament @ regular season champion	LIU Brooklyn
Pac-12	Stanford	No tournament---regular season champion receives the conference's automatic bid		
Patriot	Loyola Maryland	2018 Patriot League Men's Soccer Tournament	Higher seeds host quarterfinals at campus sites. Semifinals & Final @ regular season champion	Colgate
Southern	Mercer	2018 Southern Conference Men's Soccer Tournament	Higher seeds host 1st round & quarterfinals at campus sites. Semifinals & Final @ Summers-Taylor Stadium (Johnson City, TN)	Furman
Summit	Denver	2018 Summit League Men's Soccer Tournament	Semifinals & Final only tournament @ regular season champion	Denver
Sun Belt	Georgia State	2018 Sun Belt Conference Men's Soccer Tournament	Floyd E. Morris Field (Savannah, GA)	Georgia State
West Coast	Saint Mary's	No tournament---regular season champion receives the conference's automatic bid		
WAC	Air Force	2018 WAC Men's Soccer Tournament	Championship Field (Seattle, WA)	Grand Canyon

^{†} = A & C denote the Atlantic and Coastal divisions of the ACC.

=== Postseason awards ===
==== Hermann Trophy ====
- The Hermann Trophy is given to the year's most outstanding player. Finalists:
  - Andrew Gutman (DF), Indiana
  - Andre Shinyashiki (FW), Denver
  - J. J. Williams (FW), Kentucky

==== TDS National Player of the Year ====
- The TopDrawerSoccer.com National Player of the Year Award recognizes the top college soccer player in the nation by the TDS staff. Finalists:
  - Andrew Gutman (DF), Indiana
  - Donovan Pines (DF), Maryland
  - Andre Shinyashiki (FW), Denver
  - J. J. Williams (FW), Kentucky

==== Senior CLASS Award ====
- The Senior CLASS Award is presented each year to the most outstanding senior in NCAA Division I. Finalists:
  - Andre Shinyashiki (FW), Denver
  - Ryder Bell (FW), William & Mary
  - Alex Comsia (DF), North Carolina
  - Brad Dunwell (MF), Wake Forest
  - Mark Forrest (FW), Lehigh
  - DeJuan Jones (FW), Michigan State
  - Daniel Krutzen (DF), Albany
  - Robbie Mertz (MF), Michigan
  - Callum Montgomery (DF), Charlotte
  - Tate Schmitt (FW), Louisville

==== All-Americans ====
On December 6, 2018; United Soccer Coaches announced the All-America teams for the 2018 season.

Position	1st Team		2nd Team		3rd Team	
Position	Player	School	Player	School	Player	School
GK	Trey Muse	Indiana	Enrique Facussé	Kentucky	Remi Prieur	St. Mary's (CA)
DF	Tanner Beason; Alex Comsia; Andrew Gutman; Callum Montgomery	Stanford; North Carolina; Indiana; Charlotte	Josh Bauer; Johnny Fenwick; Donovan Pines	New Hampshire; High Point; Maryland	Dan Bent; Erik Holt; Aimé Mabika	Wright State; UCLA; Kentucky
MF	Giuseppe Barone; Tucker Bone; Bruno Lapa	Michigan State; Air Force; Wake Forest	Wouter Verstraaten; Brad Dunwell; Mauricio Pineda; Camden Riley	Pacific; Wake Forest; North Carolina; Pacific	Louis Perez; Joey Piatczyc; Barry Sharifi	UCF; West Virginia; Loyola Maryland
FW	Omir Fernandez; Cal Jennings; Andre Shinyashiki; JJ Williams	Wake Forest; UCF; Denver; Kentucky	Benji Michel; Griffin Dorsey; Jack Hallahan; Daniele Proch	Portland; Indiana; Michigan; Duke	Amir Bashti; Austin Dewing; David Egbo; Jake Rudel; Brian Saramago	Stanford; Air Force; Akron; St. Mary's (CA); Loyola Maryland

==== Conference player and coaches of the year ====
Conference	Conference Player of the Year	Offensive Player of the Year	Defensive Player of the Year	Midfielder of the Year	Goalkeeper of the Year	Rookie of the Year	Conference Coach of the Year
America East	—N/a	Geo Alves; Vermont	Josh Bauer; New Hampshire	Martieon Watson; Stony Brook	Lars Huxsohl; New Hampshire	Christian Miesch; Stony Brook	Ryan Anatol; Stony Brook
American	Cal Jennings; UCF	Cal Jennings; UCF	Jacob Hauser-Ramsey; Connecticut	Louis Perez; UCF	Yannik Oettl; UCF	—N/a	Scott Calabrese; UCF
ACC	—N/a	Omir Fernandez; Wake Forest	Alex Comsia; North Carolina	Bruno Lapa; Wake Forest	—N/a	Issa Rayyan; Duke	Bobby Muuss; Wake Forest
Atlantic Sun	Logan Paynter; Lipscomb	Logan Paynter; Lipscomb	Preston Kilwien; FGCU	—N/a	Gustavo Vasconcelos; FGCU	O'Vonte Mullings; FGCU	Charles Marrow; Lipscomb
Atlantic 10	—N/a	Janos Loebe; Fordham	Jørgen Oland; Fordham	Siad Haji; VCU	—N/a	John Klein; Saint Louis	Dave Giffard; VCU
Big East	—N/a	Sven Koenig; Creighton	Dylan Nealis; Georgetown	Joel Rydstrand; Creighton	Luis Barraza; Marquette	Skage Simonsen; St. John's	Elmar Bolowich; Creighton
Big South	—N/a	Ilias Kosmidis; High Point	Johnny Fenwick; High Point	Tony Pineda; High Point	—N/a	Amadou Macky Diop; Radford	E. J. O'Keeffe; High Point
Big Ten	—N/a	Jack Hallahan; Michigan	Andrew Gutman; Indiana	Giuseppe Barone; Michigan State	Trey Muse; Indiana	Jack Maher; Indiana	Todd Yeagley; Indiana
Big West	—N/a	Ivan Canales; UC Irvine	Roy Boateng; UC Davis	Daniel Crisostomo; UC Irvine	Henrik Regitnig; Cal State Northridge	Benji Kikanović; Sacramento State	Yossi Raz; UC Irvine
Colonial	Phillip Goodrum; UNCW	—N/a	Sean Nealis; Hofstra	—N/a	—N/a	Timo Hummrich; Delaware	Paul Zazenski; James Madison
Conference USA	JJ Williams; Kentucky	JJ Williams; Kentucky	Callum Montgomery; Charlotte	—N/a	Elliot Panicco; Charlotte	Jason Reyes; Kentucky	Johan Cedergren; Kentucky
Horizon	Jesus Perez; UIC	Max Todd; UIC	Dan Bent; Wright State	Jesus Perez; UIC	Joel Sundell; Wright State	Alex Willis; Northern Kentucky	Jake Slemker; Wright State
Ivy	—N/a	Kevin O’Toole; Princeton	Dylan Castanheira; Columbia	—N/a	—N/a	Emeka Eneli; Cornell	Jim Barlow; Princeton
MAAC	—N/a	Eamon Whelan; Quinnipiac	Jonas Vergin; Fairfield	—N/a	Gordon Botterill; Fairfield	Mauro Bravo; Iona	Carl Rees; Fairfield
Mid-American	Joey Piatczyc; West Virginia	—N/a	—N/a	—N/a	—N/a	Nick Markanich; Northern Illinois	Marlon LeBlanc; West Virginia
Missouri Valley	Nicholas Brodaki; Central Arkansas	Nicholas Brodaki; Central Arkansas	Grant Stoneman; Loyola Chicago	—N/a	Josh Lagudah; Loyola Chicago	Mathias Nors; Evansville	Ross Duncan; Central Arkansas
Northeast	Mario Mastrangelo; Saint Francis (PA)	Mario Mastrangelo; Saint Francis (PA)	Erik Johansson; LIU Brooklyn	—N/a	—N/a	Sam Illin; LIU Brooklyn	T. J. Kostecky; LIU Brooklyn
Pac-12	Tanner Beason; Stanford	—N/a	Tanner Beason; Stanford	—N/a	—N/a	Sofiane Djeffal; Oregon State	Terry Boss; Oregon State
Patriot	—N/a	Mark Forrest; Lehigh	Aram Ouligian; Colgate	Barry Sharifi; Loyola (MD)	Chase Vosvick; Loyola (MD)	Jacob Williams; Navy	Steve Nichols; Loyola (MD)
Southern	Trevor Martineau; Mercer	—N/a	—N/a	—N/a	Ben Hale; Furman	Trevor Martineau; Mercer	Brad Ruzzo; Mercer
Summit	—N/a	Andre Shinyashiki; Denver	Scott DeVoss; Denver	—N/a	Will Palmquist; Denver	Callum Stretch; Denver	Jamie Franks; Denver
Sun Belt	Javier Carbonell; Georgia Southern	Yazeed Matthews; Coastal Carolina	Kyle Clinton; Georgia State	Javier Carbonell; Georgia Southern	Jake Chasteen; Appalachian State	Logan Luque; Georgia State	Brett Surrency; Georgia State
WAC	—N/a	Tucker Bone; Air Force	Andrea Seazzu; Air Force	—N/a	—N/a	Declan McGlynn; Seattle U	Paul Leese; UTRGV
West Coast	Camden Riley; Pacific	Camden Riley; Pacific	Wouter Verstraaten; Pacific	—N/a	Remi Prieur; Saint Mary's (CA)	Sebastian Schacht; Saint Mary's (CA)	Adam Cooper; Saint Mary's (CA)

=== Final rankings ===
Rank	United Soccer Coaches	TopDrawerSoccer.com	College Soccer News
1	Maryland	Maryland	Maryland
2	Akron	Akron	Akron
3	Indiana	Indiana	Indiana
4	Michigan State	Michigan State	Michigan State
5	Kentucky	Kentucky	Kentucky
6	Wake Forest	Stanford	Wake Forest
7	Stanford	Notre Dame	Stanford
8	Notre Dame	James Madison	Saint Mary's
9	Saint Mary's	Wake Forest	James Madison
10	James Madison	Saint Mary's	North Carolina
11	Duke	Virginia	Louisville
12	Air Force	Georgetown	Georgetown
13	Georgetown	Duke	Notre Dame
14	North Carolina	Virginia Tech	Duke
15	Virginia	Air Force	Virginia
16	Louisville	Lipscomb	Air Force
17	Virginia Tech	UC Irvine	Denver
18	UCF	Louisville	Michigan
19	Denver	North Carolina	UCF
20	Charlotte	Denver	Virginia Tech
21	Portland	Michigan	Charlotte
22	West Virginia	Syracuse	Portland
23	Oregon State	West Virginia	Connecticut
24	Michigan	NC State	West Virginia
25	Lipscomb	Connecticut	Lipscomb
26	UC Irvine	UCF	Oregon State
27	Pacific	Charlotte	SMU
28	Washington	Pacific	Colgate
29	Colgate	Portland	New Hampshire
30	Connecticut	Oregon State	Rhode Island

== Statistics ==
=== Individuals ===
GOALS
Rank	Scorer	School	Games	Goals
1	Andre Shinyashiki	Denver	21	28
2	Cal Jennings	UCF	18	20
3	J. J. Williams	Kentucky	22	18
4	Alex Willis	Northern Kentucky	17	16
5	Javier Carbonell	Georgia Southern	16	15
5	Edward Kizza	Pittsburgh	18	15
5	Abdou Mbacke Thiam	Connecticut	20	15
7	Jordan Hall	Rutgers	18	14
7	Kyle Edwards	UTRGV	20	14
10	Yazeed Matthews	Coastal Carolina	15	13
10	Eamon Whelan	Quinnipiac	18	13
10	Max Wilschrey	Old Dominion	18	13
10	Jake Rudel	Saint Mary's	20	13
10	Tucker Bone	Air Force	22	13
10	David Egbo	Akron	23	13

Last update on 12/10

GOALS AGAINST AVERAGE
Rank	Keeper	School	Games	Minutes	GA	GAA
1	Zach Rowell	UMass Lowell	11	983	4	0.366
2	Remi Prieur	Saint Mary's	20	1861	8	0.387
3	Enrique Facussé	Kentucky	22	2010	11	0.492
4	James Pyle	North Carolina	19	1751	10	0.514
5	TJ Bush	James Madison	23	2162	13	0.541
5	Trey Muse	Indiana	24	2162	13	0.541
7	Lars Huxsohl	New Hampshire	17	1559	10	0.577
8	Elliot Panicco	Charlotte	21	1963	13	0.596
9	Andrew Thomas	Stanford	21	2011	14	0.626
10	Paul Kruse	Creighton	18	1697	12	0.636

Last update on 12/10

ASSISTS
Rank	Player	School	Games	Assists
1	Trevor Swartz	Indiana	24	16
2	Jackson Dietrich	Wright State	19	12
2	Jesus Perez	UIC	19	12
3	Alex Greive	Northern Kentucky	17	11
3	Janos Loebe	Fordham	17	11
3	Sergio Rivas	Seattle	20	11
6	Siad Haji	VCU	18	10
6	Joey Piatczyc	West Virginia	18	10
6	Romain Lopez	Purdue Fort Wayne	19	10
6	Filip Nordstrom	LIU Brooklyn	20	10
6	Markell Saddler	UIC	20	10
6	Abdou Mbacke Thiam	Connecticut	20	10
6	Teddy Chaouche	Charlotte	21	10
6	Nico Clasen	UNLV	21	10
6	Elliott Otmani	Rider	21	10
6	Kalil ElMedkhar	Kentucky	22	10
6	Giuseppe Barone	Michigan State	23	10

Last update on 12/10

SAVE PERCENTAGE
Rank	Keeper	School	Games	Minutes	Saves	GA	Save %
1	Remi Prieur	Saint Mary's	20	1861	55	8	.873
2	George Tasouris	Grand Canyon	19	1735	92	15	.860
3	Andrew Thomas	Stanford	21	2011	82	14	.854
4	Elliot Panicco	Charlotte	21	1963	73	13	.849
5	Jared Brown	Drake	17	1634	95	17	.848
6	Clay Thomas	Vermont	10	888	39	7	.848
7	Zach Rowell	UMass Lowell	11	983	22	4	,846
8	Wallis Lapsley	UC Davis	20	1858	82	15	.845
9	Chandler Cree	Northeastern	9	812	37	7	.841
10	Luis Barraza	Marquette	15	1371	78	15	.839

Last update on 12/10

TOTAL POINTS
Rank	Player	School	Games	Goals	Assists	Points
1	Andre Shinyashiki	Denver	21	28	4	60
2	Cal Jennings	UCF	18	20	5	45
3	JJ Williams	Kentucky	22	18	8	44
4	Abdou Mbacke Thiam	Connecticut	20	15	10	40
5	Alex Willis	Northern Kentucky	17	16	7	39
6	Javier Carbonell	Georgia Southern	16	15	3	33
6	Max Wilschrey	Old Dominion	18	13	7	33
6	Kyle Edwards	UTRGV	20	14	5	33
9	Tucker Bone	Air Force	22	13	6	32
9	Kalil ElMedkhar	Kentucky	22	11	10	32

Last update on 12/10

TOTAL SAVES
Rank	Keeper	School	Games	Saves
1	Broden Schull	VMI	16	114
2	Quinn McCallion	IUPUI	18	103
3	Jared Brown	Drake	17	95
3	Alex Clewis	San Jose State	19	95
3	Mathijs Swaneveld	Virginia Tech	21	95
6	Andrea Bonavia	USC Upstate	14	93
7	George Tasouris	Grand Canyon	19	92
8	Tor Erik Larsen	Purdue Fort Wayne	19	91
9	Henry Stutz	Holy Cross	17	89
19	Sean Murray	Monmouth	17	87

Last update on 12/10

- Individual statistics are through the games of December 9, 2018

=== Teams ===
SCORING OFFENSE
Rank	School	Games	Goals	Goals/Game
1	Saint Mary's	20	50	2.500
2	Wake Forest	21	52	2.476
3	Air Force	22	54	2.455
4	Saint Joseph's	18	43	2.389
5	UCF	19	44	2.316
5	Wright State	19	44	2.316
7	Kentucky	22	49	2.227
8	Mercer	18	40	2.222
9	Northern Kentucky	17	37	2.176
10	Liberty	15	32	2.133

Last update on 12/13

SCORING DEFENSE (Team Goals Against Average)
Rank	School	Games	Minutes	GA	Team GAA
1	Saint Mary's	20	1775	8	.427
2	Kentucky	22	2019	11	.490
3	North Carolina	19	1765	10	.510
4	Indiana	24	2212	13	.529
5	New Hampshire	18	1673	10	.538
6	James Madison	23	2162	13	.541
7	Charlotte	21	1968	13	.595
8	Stanford	21	2016	14	.625
9	Princeton	18	1714	12	.630
10	Creighton	18	1697	12	.636

Last update on 12/13

SHUTOUT PERCENTAGE
Rank	School	Games	Shutouts	Shutout %
1	Saint Mary's	20	15	.750
2	Kentucky	22	14	.636
3	Indiana	24	15	.625
4	Charlotte	21	13	.619
5	Stanford	21	12	.571
6	James Madison	23	13	.565
6	Maryland	23	13	.565
8	New Hampshire	18	10	.566
8	UMass Lowell	18	10	.566
10	Virginia	17	9	.529

Last update on 12/13

- Team statistics are through the games of December 9, 2018

WON-LOST-TIED PERCENTAGE
Rank	School	Wins	Loses	Ties	W-L-T %
1	Saint Mary's	18	0	2	.950
2	Kentucky	19	2	1	.886
3	Wake Forest	18	3	0	.857
4	Indiana	20	3	1	.854
5	High Point	13	3	2	.778
6	Air Force	17	5	0	.773
7	North Carolina	14	4	1	.763
7	UCF	13	3	3	.763
7	Wright State	13	3	3	.763
10	Denver	15	4	2	.762

Last update on 12/13

== Attendances ==
The 50 men's college soccer teams with the highest average home attendance:

#	Football club	Average attendance
1	UConn Huskies	3,213
2	Maryland Terrapins	3,115
3	Creighton Bluejays	2,718
4	Cal Poly Mustangs	2,702
5	Indiana Hoosiers	2,433
6	South Carolina Gamecocks	2,380
7	Wake Forest Demon Deacons	2,279
8	Grand Canyon Antelopes	2,264
9	UC Santa Barbara Gauchos	2,255
10	Portland Pilots	2,026
11	Utah Valley Wolverines	1,891
12	Clemson Tigers	1,797
13	Kentucky Wildcats	1,769
14	Virginia Cavaliers	1,639
15	New Hampshire Wildcats	1,506
16	Akron Zips	1,419
17	UMBC Retrievers	1,346
18	Syracuse Orange	1,305
19	Louisville Cardinals	1,297
20	Providence Friars	1,257
21	Stanford Cardinal	1,254
22	UCLA Bruins	1,240
23	NC State Wolfpack	1,127
24	Michigan State Spartans	1,123
25	Rhode Island Rams	1,106
26	Penn State Nittany Lions	1,086
27	New Mexico Lobos	1,081
28	Washington Huskies	1,062
29	Michigan Wolverines	1,061
30	Saint Louis Billikens	1,051
31	North Carolina Tar Heels	1,018
32	Georgetown Hoyas	954
33	Charlotte 49ers	911
34	UNLV Rebels	879
35	High Point Panthers	866
36	UNCW Seahawks	864
37	Albany Great Danes	848
38	Binghamton Bearcats	847
39	Notre Dame Fighting Irish	846
40	Navy Midshipmen	774
41	St. John's Red Storm	765
42	Santa Clara Broncos	724
43	Cincinnati Bearcats	715
44	SIUE Cougars	706
45	Ohio State Buckeyes	699
46	Bakersfield Roadrunners	666
47	FGCU Eagles	666
48	Vermont Catamounts	658
49	South Florida Bulls	643
50	Army Black Knights	637

== See also ==
- College soccer
- List of NCAA Division I men's soccer programs
- 2018 in American soccer
- 2018 NCAA Division I Men's Soccer Championship
- 2018 NCAA Division I women's soccer season
- 2018 U.S. Soccer Spring Men's College Program
- 2019 MLS SuperDraft
