= 2018 NCAA Men's Soccer All-Americans =

An All-American team is an honorary sports team composed of the best amateur players of a specific season for each team position—who in turn are given the honorific "All-America" and typically referred to as "All-American athletes", or simply "All-Americans". Although the honorees generally do not compete together as a unit, the term is used in U.S. team sports to refer to players who are selected by members of the national media. Walter Camp selected the first All-America team in the early days of American football in 1889. The 2018 NCAA Men's Soccer All-Americans are honorary lists that include All-American selections from the United Soccer Coaches (USC), Top Drawer Soccer (TDS), Soccer America (TSN), and College Soccer News for the 2018 NCAA Division I men's soccer season. All selectors choose at least a first, second, and third 11-man team.

Although the aforementioned lists are used to determine consensus honors, there are numerous other All-American lists. The three finalists for the Hermann Trophy are described as Hermann All-Americans. The ten finalists for the Senior CLASS Award are described as Senior All-Americans. Other All-American lists include those determined by Hero Sports and many others. The scholar-athletes selected by College Sports Information Directors of America (CoSIDA) are termed Academic All-Americans.

== Individual All-America teams ==
=== By player ===
This list is of players who were named first-team All-Americans by each respective publication.

Key

CSN	College Soccer News
SA	Soccer America
TDS	Top Drawer Soccer
USC	United Soccer Coaches
*	Consensus All-American (selected by all selectors)
†	Awarded the Hermann Trophy as national Player of the Year

List

Position	Name	School	CSN	SA	TDS	USC	Notes
Goalkeeper	Trey Muse*	Indiana	✓	✓	✓	✓	Big Ten Goalkeeper of the Year
Defender	Tanner Beason*	Stanford	✓	✓	✓	✓	Pac-12 Player of the Year
Defender	Alex Comsia	North Carolina	✓	✓	—	✓	ACC Defender of the Year
Defender	Andrew Gutman^{†}*	Indiana	✓	✓	✓	✓	Hermann Trophy winner
Defender	Donovan Pines	Maryland	—	—	✓	—	
Midfielder	Giuseppe Barone*	Michigan State	✓	✓	✓	✓	Big Ten Midfielder of the Year
Midfielder	Tucker Bone*	Air Force	✓	✓	✓	✓	WAC Player of the Year
Midfielder	Siad Haji	VCU	—	—	✓	—	A-10 Midfielder of the Year
Midfielder	Callum Montgomery	Charlotte	—	✓	—	✓	CUSA Defender of the Year
Forward	Omir Fernandez	Wake Forest	✓	✓	—	✓	ACC Player of the Year
Forward	Bruno Lapa	Wake Forest	✓	✓	—	✓	ACC Midfielder of the Year
Forward	Cal Jennings*	UCF	✓	✓	✓	✓	American Player of the Year
Forward	Benji Michel	Portland	—	—	✓	—	
Forward	Tate Schmitt	Louisville	—	—	✓	—	
Forward	Andre Shinyashiki*	Denver	✓	✓	✓	✓	Senior CLASS Award winner
Forward	J. J. Williams*	Kentucky	✓	✓	✓	✓	CUSA Player of the Year

=== By team ===
All-America Team	First team		Second team		Third team	
All-America Team	Player	School	Player	School	Player	School
College Soccer News	J. J. Williams	Kentucky	Jake Rudel	Saint Mary's	David Egbo	Akron
College Soccer News	Andre Shinyashiki	Denver	Benji Michel	Portland	Phillip Goodrum	UNCW
College Soccer News	Cal Jennings	UCF	Jack Hallahan	Michigan	Logan Paynter	Lipscomb
College Soccer News	Giuseppe Barone	Michigan State	Austin Dewing	Air Force	Mark Forrest	Lehigh
College Soccer News	Omir Fernandez	Wake Forest	Daniele Proch	Duke	Ivan Canales	UC Irvine
College Soccer News	Tucker Bone	Air Force	Camden Riley	Pacific	Mauricio Pineda	North Carolina
College Soccer News	Bruno Lapa	Wake Forest	Griffin Dorsey	Indiana	Josh Bauer	New Hampshire
College Soccer News	Andrew Gutman	Indiana	Joey Piatczyc	West Virginia	Dan Bent	Wright State
College Soccer News	Tanner Beason	Stanford	Callum Montgomery	Charlotte	Johnny Fenwick	High Point
College Soccer News	Alex Comsia	North Carolina	Donovan Pines	Maryland	Dylan Nealis	Georgetown
College Soccer News	Trey Muse	Indiana	Enrique Facusse	Kentucky	Remi Prieur	Saint Mary's
Soccer America	Trey Muse	Indiana	Enrique Facusse	Kentucky	Remi Prieur	Saint Mary's
Soccer America	Tanner Beason	Stanford	Josh Bauer	New Hampshire	Dan Bent	Wright State
Soccer America	Alex Comsia	North Carolina	Johnny Fenwick	High Point	Erik Holt	UCLA
Soccer America	Andrew Gutman	Indiana	Donovan Pines	Maryland	Aimé Mabika	Kentucky
Soccer America	Callum Montgomery	Charlotte	Wouter Verstraaten	Pacific	Louis Perez	UCF
Soccer America	Giuseppe Barone	Michigan State	Brad Dunwell	Wake Forest	Joey Piatczyc	West Virginia
Soccer America	Tucker Bone	Air Force	Mauricio Pineda	North Carolina	Barry Sharifi	Loyola (MD)
Soccer America	Bruno Lapa	Wake Forest	Camden Riley	Pacific	Amir Bashti	Stanford
Soccer America	Omir Fernandez	Wake Forest	Benji Michel	Portland	Austin Dewing	Air Force
Soccer America	Cal Jennings	UCF	Griffin Dorsey	Indiana	David Egbo	Akron
Soccer America	Andre Shinyashiki	Denver	Jack Hallahan	Michigan	Jake Rudel	Saint Mary's
Soccer America	J. J. Williams	Kentucky	Daniele Proch	Duke	Brian Saramago	Loyola (MD)
Top Drawer Soccer	Andrew Gutman	Indiana	Tate Schmitt	Louisville	Griffin Dorsey	Indiana
Top Drawer Soccer	Donovan Pines	Maryland	Amar Sejdič	Maryland	Brad Dunwell	Wake Forest
Top Drawer Soccer	Andre Shinyashiki	Denver	Benji Michel	Portland	David Loera	NC State
Top Drawer Soccer	J. J. Williams	Kentucky	Mauricio Pineda	North Carolina	Abdi Mohamed	Akron
Top Drawer Soccer	Omir Fernandez	Wake Forest	Callum Montgomery	Charlotte	Patrick Nielsen	Michigan State
Top Drawer Soccer	Tanner Beason	Stanford	Bruno Lapa	Wake Forest	Kalil El-Medkhar	Kentucky
Top Drawer Soccer	Trey Muse	Indiana	Dylan Nealis	Georgetown	Joey Piatczyc	West Virginia
Top Drawer Soccer	Siad Haji	VCU	Remi Prieur	Saint Mary's	Wouter Verstraaten	Pacific
Top Drawer Soccer	Cal Jennings	UCF	Alex Comsia	North Carolina	Jake Rudel	Saint Mary's
Top Drawer Soccer	Giuseppe Barone	Michigan State	Jack Hallahan	Michigan	David Egbo	Akron
Top Drawer Soccer	Tucker Bone	Air Force	Camden Riley	Pacific	James Pyle	North Carolina
United Soccer Coaches	Trey Muse	Indiana	Enrique Facusse	Kentucky	Remi Prieur	Saint Mary's
United Soccer Coaches	Tanner Beason	Stanford	Josh Bauer	New Hampshire	Dan Bent	Wright State
United Soccer Coaches	Alex Comsia	North Carolina	Johnny Fenwick	High Point	Erik Holt	UCLA
United Soccer Coaches	Andrew Gutman	Indiana	Donovan Pines	Maryland	Aimé Mabika	Kentucky
United Soccer Coaches	Callum Montgomery	Charlotte	Wouter Verstraaten	Pacific	Louis Perez	UCF
United Soccer Coaches	Giuseppe Barone	Michigan State	Brad Dunwell	Wake Forest	Joey Piatczyc	West Virginia
United Soccer Coaches	Tucker Bone	Air Force	Mauricio Pineda	North Carolina	Barry Sharifi	Loyola (MD)
United Soccer Coaches	Bruno Lapa	Wake Forest	Camden Riley	Pacific	Amir Bashti	Stanford
United Soccer Coaches	Omir Fernandez	Wake Forest	Benji Michel	Portland	Austin Dewing	Air Force
United Soccer Coaches	Cal Jennings	UCF	Griffin Dorsey	Indiana	David Egbo	Akron
United Soccer Coaches	Andre Shinyashiki	Denver	Jack Hallahan	Michigan	Jake Rudel	Saint Mary's
United Soccer Coaches	J. J. Williams	Kentucky	Daniele Proch	Duke	Brian Saramago	Loyola (MD)

== Academic All-Americans ==
CoSIDA names three Academic All-American teams for the 2018 season.

First team		Second team		Third team	
Player	School	Player	School	Player	School
Hendrik Hilpert	Syracuse	Jake Chasteen	Appalachian State	Michael Creek	Missouri State
Gideon Betz	Campbell	Ivan Blaskic	UMass Lowell	Alex Comsia	North Carolina
Kyle Hiebert	Missouri State	David Grana	Saint Joseph's	Austin Day	Grand Canyon
Callum Montgomery	Charlotte	Simon Waever	Evansville	Marius Kullmann	Loyola Chicago
Henrik Mueller	Coastal Carolina	Dylan Waugaman	Valparaiso	Collin Liberty	Stanford
Ivo Cerda	Michigan	Jack Casey	Notre Dame	Nils Bruening	North Carolina
Christopher Holmes	Central Arkansas	Marcel Fahrenholz	Elon	Niko Klosterhalfen	Old Dominion
Simon Spangenberg	New Mexico	Luka Prpa	Marquette	Rikard Lindqvist	Northern Kentucky
Anthony Bowie	Western Michigan	Ahu Obhakhan	Fairleigh Dickinson	Ryder Bell	William & Mary
Sven Koenig	Creighton	Brian Stepanek	Gardner-Webb	Tyrone Mondi	Coastal Carolina
Andre Shinyashiki	Denver	Thomas Ueland	Notre Dame	Daniele Proch	Duke

== Senior All-Americans ==
The 10 finalists for the Senior CLASS Award are considered Senior All-Americans.

Player	Position	School
Andre Shinyashiki	Forward	Denver
Ryder Bell	Forward	William & Mary
Alex Comsia	Defender	North Carolina
Brad Dunwell	Midfielder	Wake Forest
Mark Forrest	Forward	Lehigh
DeJuan Jones	Forward	Michigan State
Daniel Krutzen	Defender	Albany
Robbie Mertz	Midfielder	Michigan
Callum Montgomery	Defender	Charlotte
Tate Schmitt	Forward	Louisville
