= 2018 Western Athletic Conference men's soccer season =

- League: NCAA Division I
- Sport: Soccer
- Duration: August 24, 2018 – November 9, 2018
- Teams: 12

2019 MLS SuperDraft

Regular Season

Western Athletic Conference men's soccer seasons
- ← 2017 2019 →

2018 Western Athletic Conference men's soccer standings
	Conf.					Overall
Team	W		L		T	W		L		T
No. 12 Air Force +	8	–	2	–	0	17	–	5	–	0
UTRGV	8	–	3	–	0	14	–	6	–	0
Seattle	7	–	4	–	0	13	–	6	–	1
Grand Canyon ‡	6	–	4	–	0	12	–	8	–	1
Utah Valley	6	–	4	–	0	9	–	9	–	0
UNLV	5	–	5	–	1	10	–	10	–	1
San Jose State	5	–	5	–	1	8	–	10	–	3
Cal Baptist ^{#}	5	–	6	–	0	9	–	9	–	1
UMKC	4	–	7	–	0	5	–	12	–	0
Houston Baptist	3	–	6	–	1	5	–	8	–	3
Cal St. Bakersfield	3	–	7	–	1	5	–	12	–	1
Incarnate Word	2	–	9	–	0	2	–	14	–	1
‡-Tournament Champion + - Invited to the NCAA Division I Men's Soccer Championship ^{#}-Ineligible (In transition); As of December 11, 2018; Rankings from United Soccer Coaches

The 2018 Western Athletic Conference men's soccer season is the 23rd consecutive competition of men's college soccer in the Western Athletic Conference under the 2018 NCAA Division I men's soccer season. The season will feature twelve teams, where five are affiliate members of the conference. Air Force, San Jose State, and UNLV will compete from the Mountain West Conference, while Houston Baptist and Incarnate Word come from the Southland Conference. Colleges in the WAC will begin competition on August 24, 2018, and conclude on November 9, 2018 after the 2018 NCAA Division I Men's Soccer Championship. Prior to the NCAA Division I Tournament Championship, there will be a postseason conference tournament held in Seattle, Washington at the Championship Field, where the winner is guaranteed to represent the WAC in the NCAA Division I Tournament. The California Baptist Lancers are ineligible for postseason as they are in transition to the NCAA Division I level. Chicago State and New Mexico State have defunct programs in this season.

== Preseason ==
=== Award watch lists ===
Listed in the order that they were released

Award	Team	Player	Position	Year
Hermann Trophy	Air Force	Tucker Bone	Forward	Senior
Hermann Trophy	Seattle	Nathan Aune	Defender	Senior

=== Media poll ===
Team

Predicted finish	Team	Votes (1st place)
1	Seattle	119 (9)
2	UNLV	105
3	Air Force	104 (3)
4	San Jose State	84
5	Utah Valley	79
6	Grand Canyon	75
7	CSU Bakersfield	55
8	UTRGV	49
9	UMKC	38
10	California Baptist	30
11	Houston Baptist	28
12	Incarnate Word	26

Individual

Letterman	Year	Position	Team
Tucker Bone	Senior	Forward	Air Force
Austin Dewing	Senior	Forward	Air Force
Marco Gonzalez	Sophomore	Forward	UNLV
Josh Drack	Sophomore	Midfielder	Grand Canyon
Timo Mehlich	Junior	Midfielder	UNLV
Sergio Rivas	Senior	Midfielder	Seattle
Nathan Aune	Senior	Defender	Seattle
Anthony Ayala	Senior	Defender	Seattle
Adam Musovski	Senior	Defender	UNLV
Andy Rios	Senior	Defender	San Jose State
Josh Adachi	Senior	Goalkeeper	Seattle

== Rankings ==
Legend
Increase in ranking
Decrease in ranking
Not ranked previous week
Selected for NCAA Tournament
Key: No. – Ranking, RV – Received votes, NR – Not ranked

	Pre	Wk 1	Wk 2	Wk 3	Wk 4	Wk 5	Wk 6	Wk 7	Wk 8	Wk 9	Wk 10	Wk 11	Wk 12	Wk 13	Wk 14	Final
Air Force	RV	NR	RV													
California Baptist	NR	NR	NR													
CSU Bakersfield	NR	NR	NR													
Grand Canyon	RV	RV	24													
Houston Baptist	NR	NR	NR													
Incarnate Word	NR	NR	NR													
San Jose State	NR	NR	NR													
Seattle	22	NR	NR													
UMKC	NR	NR	NR													
UNLV	NR	NR	RV													
UTRGV	NR	NR	NR													
Utah Valley	NR	NR	NR													

== Matches ==
- Note: Results updated after the last game of each day in WAC competition, and games are added/updated weekly after each rankings release
- Rankings are from the United Soccer Coaches Poll

=== Non–conference ===
Week One – August 24, 2018 to August 30, 2018

24 August 2018	California Baptist	0–0	Saint Peter's	Jersey City, New Jersey
2:00 p.m. MST				Stadium: Lincoln Park

24 August 2018 HBU Invitational	Saint Francis	0–0	UTRGV	Houston, Texas
4:00 p.m. MST				Stadium: Sorrels Field

24 August 2018	Florida Atlantic	0–0	UNLV	Orem, Utah
4:00 p.m. MST				Stadium: Clyde Field

24 August 2018	Virginia Tech	0–0	Air Force	Harrisonburg, Virginia
2:00 p.m. MST				Stadium: Sentara Park

24 August 2018	Missouri State	0–0	UMKC	Kansas City, Missouri
6:00 p.m. MST				Stadium: Durwood Soccer Stadium

24 August 2018 Rivalry	San Jose State	0–0	No. 1 Stanford	Stanford, California
6:00 p.m. MST, P12N				Stadium: Laird Q. Cagan Stadium

24 August 2018	Incarnate Word	0–0	Saint Mary's	Moraga, California
6:00 p.m. PST				Stadium: Saint Mary's Stadium

24 August 2018 HBU Invitational	Siena	0–0	Houston Baptist	Houston, Texas
6:30 p.m. MST				Stadium: Sorrels Field

24 August 2018	No. 22 Seattle	0–0	New Mexico	Albuquerque, New Mexico
7:00 p.m. MST				Stadium: Soccer–Track Complex

24 August 2018	Evansville	0–0	Utah Valley	Orem, Utah
7:00 p.m. MST				Stadium: Clyde Field

24 August 2018	Bethesda	0–0	CSU Bakersfield	Bakersfield, California
8:00 p.m. MST				Stadium: Main Soccer Field

24 August 2018	No. 12 Wisconsin	0–0	Grand Canyon	Phoenix, Arizona
8:00 p.m. MST				Stadium: GCU Stadium

26 August 2018 HBU Invitational	Siena	0–0	UTRGV	Houston, Texas
10:00 a.m. MST				Stadium: Sorrels Field

26 August 2018	Evansville	0–0	UNLV	Orem, Utah
10:30 a.m. MST				Stadium: Clyde Field

26 August 2018	Incarnate Word	0–0	California	Berkeley, California
3:00 p.m. MST				Stadium: Edwards Stadium

26 August 2018	Air Force	0–0	James Madison	Harrisonburg, Virginia
5:00 p.m. MST				Stadium: Sentara Park

26 August 2018	CSU Northridge	0–0	San Jose State	San Jose, California
5:00 p.m. MST				Stadium: Spartan Soccer Complex

26 August 2018 HBU Invitational	Saint Francis	0–0	Houston Baptist	Houston, Texas
6:00 p.m. MST				Stadium: Sorrels Field

27 August 2018	California Baptist	0–0	Manhattan	New York, New York
9:00 a.m. MST				Stadium: GCU Stadium

27 August 2018	Florida Atlantic	0–0	Utah Valley	Orem, Utah
7:00 p.m. MST				Stadium: Clyde Field

27 August 2018	Pacific	0–0	CSU Bakersfield	Bakersfield, California
8:00 p.m. MST				Stadium: Main Soccer Field

28 August 2018	UMKC	0–0	SIUE	Edwardsville, Illinois
6:00 p.m. MST				Stadium: Ralph Korte Stadium

== Records against other conferences ==
- Note: Conferences eligible for the 2018 NCAA Division I Men's Soccer Championship only

Conference	Record
America East	0–0
American	0–0
Atlantic 10	0–0
ACC	0–0
Atlantic Sun	0–0
Big East	0–0
Big South	0–0
Big Ten	0–0
Big West	0–0
CAA	0–0
C–USA	0–0
Horizon	0–0
Ivy League	0–0
MAAC	0–0
MAC	0–0
Missouri Valley	0–0
Northeast	0–0
Pac–12	0–0
Patriot	0–0
Southern	0–0
Summit	0–0
Sun Belt	0–0
WCC	0–0
