= Erik Stock =

Norwegian footballer (born 1971)

Personal information
- Date of birth: 10 May 1971 (age 55)
- Place of birth: Oslo, Norway
- Position: Defender

Youth career
- 1979–1986: Fagerborg
- 1986–1987: Frigg
- 1987–1991: PSV

Senior career*
Years	Team	Apps	(Gls)
1991–1996	NEC		
1996–1997	Viking	8	(0)
1997–1999	TOP Oss	60	(1)
1999–2003	Helmond Sport	95	(2)
2003–2004	VVV	31	(0)
2004–2007	VV Geldrop		

International career
1986	Norway U15	9	(1)
1987	Norway U16	5	(0)
1988	Norway U17	2	(0)
- * Club domestic league appearances and goals

Erik Stock (born 10 May 1971) is a retired Norwegian football defender.

Following a youth career in Western Oslo clubs Fagerborg from age 8 and Frigg from age 15, he received help from Hallvar Thoresen to land a trial with PSV Eindhoven. Stock was accepted into their academy of PSV. He was team captain of Norwegian youth international teams, winning 16 youth caps in total.

Stock eventually saw that a chance in PSV's first team was not likely, and went from an apprenticeship contract to a senior team contract with NEC. In NEC, Stock was among the half of the squad who were fully professional, but nonetheless he chose to supplement this with an education in business administration and marketing. In 1993–94, NEC were promoted to the Eredivisie and lost the 1993–94 KNVB Cup final to Feyenoord. Stock was the only Norwegian player in the Eredivisie when making his debut in 1994. From 1994 to 1996 he played 51 Eredivisie games for NEC. From 1997 to 2004 he played 186 Eerste Divisie games for three clubs; TOP Oss, Helmond Sport and VVV.

From 1996 to 1997, Erik Stock had his only stay in Norwegian senior football, with Eliteserien club Viking FK. Stock came out of NEC's successful 1996–97 Eredivisie relegation playoff, but wanted to try a new football milieu. He came to Viking in early June 1996, but was immediately injured. He recovered to make his debut for Viking 2 in late June, without impressing. Having barely played during the 1996 Eliteserien campaign, he was declared surplus by Viking manager Poul Erik Andreasen as the season concluded in October.

In the winter of 1997–97, Stock was on trial with FC Eindhoven and later Fortuna Köln. In April 1997 Stock went on trial in Germany again, with clubs such as Greuther Fürth and SG Wattenscheid 09 reportedly watching him. He finally left Viking in June 1997, returning to the Netherlands, where he was signed by TOP Oss without trial.

He settled in the Netherlands, working in real estate in Helmond. He was used as a Dutch–Norwegian interpreter in UEFA competitions.
