= 2018 Sun Belt Conference men's soccer tournament =

- Classification: Division I
- Teams: 5
- Matches: 4
- Site: Eagle Field at Erk Russell Park; Statesboro, Georgia
- Champions: Georgia State (1st title)
- Winning coach: Brett Surrency (1st title)
- MVP: Hannes Burmeister (Georgia State)
- Broadcast: ESPN+

2018 Sun Belt Conference men's soccer standings
	Conf.					Overall
Team	W		L		T	W		L		T
Georgia State ‡	2	–	0	–	2	11	–	6	–	3
Appalachian State	2	–	1	–	1	8	–	6	–	3
Georgia Southern	2	–	1	–	1	7	–	7	–	3
Coastal Carolina	2	–	2	–	0	10	–	6	–	0
Howard	0	–	4	–	0	2	–	10	–	3
‡-Sun Belt Tournament Champion +-Invited to the 2018 NCAA Division I Men's Soccer Championship; As of November 30, 2018; Rankings from United Soccer Coaches

The 2018 Sun Belt Conference men's soccer tournament was the 24th edition of the Sun Belt Conference Men's Soccer Tournament. The tournament will decide the Sun Belt Conference champion. The tournament will be begin on November 7 and conclude on November 11.

Coastal Carolina were the defending champions. However, they were unable to defend their title, losing to Georgia State 1–2 in the Semifinals. Georgia State went on to win the tournament 4–2 over Georgia Southern in the final. This was the first Sun Belt Conference Championship for Georgia State.

== Seeds ==
Seed	School	Conference	Tiebreaker
1	Georgia State	2–0–2	
2	Georgia Southern	2–1–1	GSO 1–0 vs. ASU
3	Appalachian State	2–1–1	ASU 0–1 vs. GSO
4	Coastal Carolina	2–2–0	
5	Howard	0–4–0	

== Bracket ==
First round Nov. 7
4	Coastal Carolina	2
5	Howard	1

Semifinals; Nov. 9
1	Georgia State	2
4	Coastal Carolina	1
2	Georgia Southern	3
3	Appalachian State	0

Championship; Nov. 11
1	Georgia State	4
2	Georgia Southern	2

== Results ==
=== First round ===
November 7
7:00 p.m. EST

No. 4 Coastal Carolina	2–1	No. 5 Howard
Ntsabeleng 53'; Mondi 66'	Report	Hart 12'

Eagle Field, Statesboro
Attendance: 0
Referee: Richonne Clark

=== Semifinals ===
November 9
4:00 p.m. EST

No. 1 Georgia State	2–1	No. 4 Coastal Carolina
Hemmings 13'; Rosenwald 77'	Report	Fortune 38' (pen.)

Eagle Field, Statesboro
Attendance: 325
Referee: Brandon Marion

November 9
7:00 p.m. EST

No. 2 Georgia Southern	3–0	No. 3 Appalachian State
Carbonell 28'; Davie 52'; Wang 88'	Report

Eagle Field, Statesboro
Attendance: 325
Referee: Jose Mendes

=== Final ===
November 11
1:00 p.m. EST

No. 1 Georgia State	4–2	No. 2 Georgia Southern
Burmeister 28' (pen.), 73' (pen.), 82'; Rosenwald 89'	Report	Carbonell 65'; Cortes 71'

Eagle Field, Statesboro
Attendance: 924
Referee: Sergio Gonzalez

== Statistics ==
=== Goalscorers ===
3 Goals

- Hannes Burmeister - Georgia Southern

2 Goals

- Javier Carbonell - Georgia Southern
- Frank Rosenwald - Georgia State

1 Goal

- Aldair Cortes - Georgia Southern
- Adam Davie - Georgia Southern
- Jaiden Fortune - Coastal Carolina
- Daniel Hart - Howard
- Max Hemmings - Georgia State
- Tyrone Mondi - Coastal Carolina
- Tsiki Ntsabeleng - Coastal Carolina
- Sander Wang - Georgia Southern

== All Tournament Team ==
**2018 Sun Belt Men's Soccer Championship All-Tournament team**
- Carlos Caro, Howard
- Ian Bennett, Appalachian State
- Zeiko Harris, Appalachian State
- Yazeed Matthews, Coastal Carolina
- Tsiki Ntsabeleng, Coastal Carolina
- Gonzalo Talavera, Georgia Southern
- Javier Carbonell, Georgia Southern
- Aldair Cortes, Georgia Southern
- Liam Fitzsimmons, Georgia State
- Max Hemmings, Georgia State
- Frank Rosenwald, Georgia State
- **Hannes Burmeister, Georgia State**
MVP in Bold
