= Brian Rowland =

Canadian retired soccer player (born 1980)

Personal information
- Full name: Brian Rowland
- Date of birth: December 30, 1980 (age 45)
- Place of birth: Toronto, Ontario, Canada
- Height: 5 ft 11 in (1.80 m)
- Position: Goalkeeper

College career
Years	Team	Apps	(Gls)
1999–2003	UMBC Retrievers		

Senior career*
Years	Team	Apps	(Gls)
1998–1999	Halifax Town		
2001–2002	Chesapeake Dragons		
2003–2004	Toronto Lynx	1	(0)
2003–2005	Baltimore Blast (indoor)	18	(0)
2005–2006	California Cougars (indoor)	3	(0)
2006	Baltimore Blast (indoor)	17	(0)
2006–2007	Milwaukee Wave (indoor)	6	(0)
2007–2009	Crystal Palace Baltimore	53	(0)

International career
2001	Canada U-20	0	(0)

Managerial career
- 2010–2017: Maryland Terrapins (assistant)
- 2018–2022: Temple Owls
- * Club domestic league appearances and goals as of 22 December 2017

Brian Rowland (born December 30, 1980) is a Canadian retired soccer player who was a goalkeeper in both the indoor and outdoor versions of the sport. He is formerly the head coach for the Temple Owls men's soccer team.

== Career ==
=== College ===
Born in Toronto, Ontario, Canada, Rowland played college soccer at the University of Maryland, Baltimore County (UMBC), where he was a four-year starter between 1999 and 2002. In 2002, he earned first team All-America East Conference, and was named an All-America honorable mention. He graduated with a bachelor's degree in economics in 2003.

=== International ===
Rowland was a member of the Canada national U20 Team, the Eastern Canadian U19 regional team and the Ontario U20 Team. He played in a friendly match for Manchester United while on trial there, trained with Everton, and Fulham, and played a couple of first team games for Halifax Town as a triallist in 1998 and 1999.

During the 2001 and 2002 Rowland also played for the Chesapeake Dragons in the Premier Development League.

=== Professional ===
Rowland turned professional upon his graduation from college in 2003, and played for his hometown club Toronto Lynx in 2003 and 2004. Rowland also has extensive indoor soccer experience, having spent time playing for Baltimore Blast, the California Cougars and Milwaukee Wave.

Rowland signed with Crystal Palace Baltimore in 2007, and has been the team's first choice goalkeeper since then, helping the team to the USL-2 postseason for the first time in 2008. He became an assistant coach for the University of Maryland men's soccer team when he retired as an active player on February 15, 2010.

=== Coaching ===
After retiring from playing, Rowland was an assistant coach for the Maryland Terrapins men's soccer team for eight years, serving as the associate head coach 2015–17. On December 22, 2017, he was named head coach of the Temple Owls of the American Athletic Conference.

== Personal ==
A native of Toronto, Ontario, Rowland earned his bachelor's degree in economics from UMBC in 2003. Rowland holds a USSF A License (2012) and is involved with US Soccer as a scout for their Youth National Teams.

Since 2004 Rowland has run a goalkeeper specific training camp named "Rowland Keeper Academy."

== Career statistics ==
Club	Season	League		Cup (Note: Includes U.S. Open Cup)		Play-Offs		Total	
Club	Season	Apps	Goals	Apps	Goals	Apps	Goals	Apps	Goals
Crystal Palace Baltimore	2007	19	0	1	0	-	-	20	0
Crystal Palace Baltimore	2008	13	0	2	0	2	0	17	0
Crystal Palace Baltimore	2009	20	0	1	0	0	0	21	0
Total	2007–present	53	0	3	0	2	0	58	0

== Head coaching record ==
Record table
Season	Team	Overall	Conference	Standing	Postseason
Temple Owls (American Athletic Conference) (2018–present)
2018	Temple	5–10–2	2–4–1		
2018	Temple	8–8–2	3–2–2		
2018	Temple	5–4–2	5–4–2	3rd	American Semifinals
2018	Temple	2–12–2	0–10–0	6th (Last)	None
Temple:		20–34–10 (–)	10–20–5 (–)		
Temple:		20–34–10 (–)	0–0–0 (–)		
Total:		20–34–10 (–)			
National champion Postseason invitational champion Conference regular season champion Conference regular season and conference tournament champion Division regular season champion Division regular season and conference tournament champion Conference tournament champion
