= 2018 ASUN men's soccer tournament =

- Classification: Division I
- Teams: 6
- Quarterfinals site: Higher seeds
- Semifinals site: Higher seeds
- Finals site: Lipscomb Soccer Complex; Nashville, Tennessee
- Champions: Lipscomb (2nd title)
- Winning coach: Charles Morrow (2nd title)
- MVP: Logan Paynter (Lipscomb)
- Broadcast: ESPN+, Facebook Live

2018 ASUN Conference men's soccer standings
	Conf.					Overall
Team	W		L		T	W		L		T
No. 25 Lipscomb ‡	5	–	1	–	0	10	–	10	–	1
Florida Gulf Coast	5	–	1	–	0	9	–	5	–	2
North Florida	3	–	3	–	0	5	–	11	–	0
Jacksonville	3	–	3	–	0	5	–	13	–	0
Liberty	2	–	3	–	1	7	–	7	–	1
Stetson	1	–	4	–	1	7	–	10	–	2
NJIT	1	–	5	–	0	6	–	11	–	0
‡ – 2018 ASUN tournament champion + – Invited to the 2018 NCAA Division I Men's Soccer Championship; As of December 11, 2018; Rankings from United Soccer Coaches

The 2018 ASUN men's soccer tournament, the 40th edition of the ASUN Men's Soccer Tournament, determined the ASUN Conference's automatic berth into the 2018 NCAA Division I Men's Soccer Championship. The tournament began on November 2 and concluded on November 10.

Lipscomb entered the tournament as the defending Atlantic Sun Tournament champions, and as the 2018 ASUN regular season champions. Outscoring their opponents 4-1 in the process, Lipscomb successfully defended their ASUN title by winning the championship match against Stetson, 2-0. Lipscomb earned their second ever berth into the NCAA Tournament, where they upset Washington and FIU en route to a Sweet Sixteen run.

== Seeds ==
Seed	School	Conference	Tiebreaker
1	Lipscomb	5–1–0	LIP 1–0 vs. FGCU
2	Florida Gulf Coast	5–1–0	FGCU 0–1 vs. LIP
3	North Florida	3–3–0	UNF 1–0 vs. JAX
4	Jacksonville	3–3–0	JAX 0–1 vs. UNF
5	Liberty	2–3–1	
6	Stetson	1–4–1	

== Bracket ==
First round Nov. 2
4	Jacksonville	2
5	Liberty	0
3	North Florida	1
6	Stetson	3

Semifinals; Nov. 4
1	Lipscomb	2
4	Jacksonville	1
2	FGCU	1 (4)
6	Stetson (pen.)	1 (5)

Final; Nov. 10
1	Lipscomb	2
6	Stetson	0

== Results ==
=== First round ===
November 2
5:00 p.m. EST

No. 3 North Florida	1–3	No. 6 Stetson
Scott 61'	Report	Scattergood 50', 85'; Northoff 78'

FGCU Soccer Complex
Fort Myers, Florida
Attendance: 99
Referee: Chris Penso

November 2
8:00 p.m. EST

No. 4 Jacksonville	2–0	No. 5 Liberty
Dixon 57'; Manzo 87'	Report

Lipscomb Soccer Complex
Nashville, Tennessee
Attendance: 121
Referee: Guido Gonzales

=== Semifinals ===
November 4
1:00 p.m. EST

No. 2 FGCU	1–1 (a.e.t.)	No. 6 Stetson
Medilah 45'	Report	Scattergood 73'
Penalties
Riley (penalty scored); Marriott (penalty scored); Clement (penalty missed); Medilah (penalty scored); Zapata (penalty scored); João Burti (penalty missed)	4–5	(penalty scored) O'Brien; (penalty scored) Scattergood; (penalty missed) Monsanto; (penalty scored) Northoff; (penalty scored) Chalbaud; (penalty scored) Pinheiro

FGCU Soccer Complex
Fort Myers, Florida
Attendance: 485
Referee: Michael Lavergne

November 4
3:00 p.m. EST

No. 1 Lipscomb	2–1	No. 4 Jacksonville
Locke 13'; Jakubowski 71'	Report	Davis 15'

Lipscomb Soccer Complex
Nashville, Tennessee
Attendance: 294
Referee: Kirk Downs

=== Final ===
November 10
8:00 p.m. EST

No. 1 Lipscomb	2–0	No. 6 Stetson
Paynter 40', 54'	Report

Lipscomb Soccer Complex
Nashville, Tennessee
Attendance: 1,398

== Statistics ==
=== Top goalscorers ===
3 Goals

- (England) Lewis Scattergood – Stetson

2 Goals

- (United States) Logan Paynter – Lipscomb

1 Goal

- (United States) Alex Dixon – Jacksonville
- (Poland) Zarek Jakubowski – Lipscomb
- (United States) Ben Locke – Lipscomb
- (United States) Jose Manzo – Jacksonville
- (France) Ryan Medilah – Florida Gulf Coast
- (Germany) Raphael Northoff – Stetson
- (United States) Collin Scott – North Florida

== All Tournament Team ==
**2018 A-Sun Men’s Soccer All-Tournament team**

Ryan Birchfield, Lipscomb
Noah Gulden, Lipscomb
Ben Locke, Lipscomb
Braeden Luna, Stetson
**Logan Paynter, Lipscomb**
Lewis Scattergood, Stetson

MVP in **Bold**
