= Remi Prieur =

Austrian footballer (born 1997)

Rémi Prieur
Personal information
- Full name: Rémi Prieur
- Date of birth: 17 April 1997 (age 29)
- Place of birth: Mödling, Austria
- Height: 6 ft 2 in (1.88 m)
- Position: Goalkeeper

Youth career
- 2014–2015: San Jose Earthquakes

College career
Years	Team	Apps	(Gls)
2015–2019	Saint Mary's Gaels	55	(0)

Senior career*
Years	Team	Apps	(Gls)
2016–2017	Burlingame Dragons	3	(0)
2018	San Francisco City	2	(0)
2019	Portland Timbers U23s	2	(0)
2020–2021	Sporting Kansas City II	5	(0)
- * Club domestic league appearances and goals as of 6 October 2021

Rémi Prieur (born 17 April 1997) is an Austrian footballer.

== Career ==
=== Youth, college and amateur ===
Prieur played with the San Jose Earthquakes academy prior to playing college soccer at Saint Mary's College of California in 2015. He didn't see any first team action as a freshman, but went on to make 55 appearances for the Gaels. Prieur earned All-America Third Team recognition and was named WCC Goalkeeper of the Year during his 2018 season. Prieur also earned All-America Second Team honors and was named WCC Goalkeeper of the Year for the second consecutive season following his senior year in 2019.

Whilst at college, Prieur played in the USL League Two with Burlingame Dragons, San Francisco City and Portland Timbers U23s.

=== Professional ===
On 13 January 2020, Prieur was selected 47th overall in the 2020 MLS SuperDraft by Columbus Crew SC. However, he did not for sign the club.

On 17 February 2020, Prieur signed with USL Championship side Sporting Kansas City II. He made his debut on 29 July 2020, starting against Louisville City FC in a 2–1 win. Following the 2021 season, Kansas City opted to decline their contract option on Prieur.

== Personal ==
Prieur was born in Mödling, Austria, but raised in San Ramon, California, in the United States. He holds both American and French nationalities.
