= Alex Comsia =

Canadian soccer player

Personal information
- Full name: Alexander Regis Comsia
- Date of birth: August 1, 1996 (age 30)
- Place of birth: Vancouver, British Columbia, Canada
- Height: 1.83 m (6 ft 0 in)
- Position: Defender

Youth career
- 2004–2007: Lynn Valley SA
- 2007–2008: Mount Seymour SA
- 2008: Lions Gate SA
- 2008–2009: Vancouver Whitecaps FC Prospects
- 2008–2010: North Shore Selects
- 2010: Burnaby Selects
- 2011: Richmond Selects
- 2011–2014: Vancouver Whitecaps FC Academy
- 2014–2015: Strasbourg

College career
Years	Team	Apps	(Gls)
2015–2018	North Carolina Tar Heels	80	(0)

Senior career*
Years	Team	Apps	(Gls)
2015–2017	North Carolina FC U23	7	(0)
2018	Tobacco Road FC	8	(0)
2019–2020	North Carolina FC	38	(0)

International career^{‡}
2012–2013	Canada U17	8	(0)
2014–2015	Canada U20	4	(0)
2015	Canada U23	1	(0)
- * Club domestic league appearances and goals as of September 20, 2021 ‡ National team caps and goals as of March 10, 2019

Alexander Regis Comsia (born August 1, 1996) is a Canadian soccer player who last played for North Carolina FC in the USL Championship. He played college soccer for the North Carolina Tar Heels program. After his Senior season, Comsia was selected First team 2018 NCAA Men's Soccer All-Americans and the ACC Defender of the Year, two of the most prestigious individual awards in collegiate soccer.

== Career ==
=== Club ===
==== North Carolina FC ====
After four outstanding years at the NCAA Division I University of North Carolina at Chapel Hill, including two consecutive College Cup appearances, Comsia was invited to the MLS Combine. After not getting drafted in the 2019 MLS SuperDraft, Comsia signed with North Carolina FC. He made his debut in their 2019 season opener against two-time defending USL Cup champion Louisville City, starting and playing full game in a 4–1 victory. On March 23, 2019, Comsia came in as a substitute to help his team secure a 2–1 victory vs Liga MX Club Necaxa. Comsia would return to the club in the 2020 season.

=== International ===
Comsia represented Canada at the under-17 level at the 2013 CONCACAF U-17 Championship where he played every minute to help the team win the bronze medal and qualify to the 2013 FIFA U-17 World Cup. He played again every minute in Dubai at the 2013 FIFA U-17 World Cup helping the team earn 3rd place in Group E with draws vs Austria (2–2) and Iran (1–1). Canada did not advance beyond the Group stage, losing its final game to eventual semifinalist Argentina. In February 2015 Comsia was the youngest player named to the Canadian under-20 team for the 2015 CONCACAF U-20 Championship. In June 2015 Comsia was again the youngest player named to the Canada U23 team for the 2015 Pan American Games where he started and played every minute in the inaugural game vs the Brazil national under-23 football team. Overall, Comsia represented Canada as a starter playing full game in over 30 international matches at the U23, U20 and U17 level, including against Mexico (4 times), Israel, Italy, Slovenia, Moldova, Azerbaijan, Morocco (2 times), USA (2 times), United Arab Emirates, Panama (3 times), Costa Rica (3 times), Trinidad and Tobago, Jamaica, Honduras, Russia (2 times), Austria, Iran, Argentina, China, Northern Ireland, England, Haiti, El Salvador and Brazil.

== Honours ==
=== Individual ===
- First team 2018 NCAA Men's Soccer All-Americans as selected by each of the United Soccer Coaches, Soccer America and College Soccer News.
- ACC Defender of the Year: 2018
- MAC Hermann Trophy Semifinalist (2018)
- Senior CLASS Award Finalist: 2018
- First team 2018 NCAA Division I Men's Soccer All-South Region as selected by the United Soccer Coaches
- First team 2018 Atlantic Coast Conference men's soccer season
- ACC Men's Soccer All-Tournament Team: 2018
- ACC Men's Soccer Scholar-Athlete of the Year: 2018
- First team 2018 College Soccer News Preseason All-American
- MAC Hermann Trophy Watch List: 2018
- 2018 Premier Development League (PDL) Top 20 Prospects
- 2018 Premier Development League (PDL) Players Watch List
