= Daniele Proch =

Italian footballer (born 1996)

Personal information
- Date of birth: 8 November 1996 (age 29)
- Place of birth: Riva del Garda, Italy
- Height: 5 ft 8 in (1.73 m)
- Position: Forward

Team information
- Current team: Breno
- Number: 18

Youth career
- 2002–2012: Baone
- 2012–2014: Südtirol

College career
Years	Team	Apps	(Gls)
2016	Catawba Indians	16	(8)
2017–2019	Duke Blue Devils	57	(28)

Senior career*
Years	Team	Apps	(Gls)
2014–2016	Südtirol	0	(0)
2014–2016	→ Dro (loan)	57	(7)
2020	North Carolina FC	11	(0)
2021	Caldiero Terme	20	(5)
2021–2022	Delta Porto Tolle	32	(6)
2022–2023	Offanenghese		
2023–2024	Soresinese		
2024–	Breno	2	(0)
- * Club domestic league appearances and goals as of 17 November 2024

Daniele Proch (born 8 November 1996) is an Italian professional footballer who plays as a forward for Breno in Italy's Serie D.

== Career ==
=== College ===
Proch played college soccer at Catawba College in 2016. In his one season there he recorded 8 goals and 7 assists in 16 games, he was also named South Atlantic Conference Freshman of the Year.

In 2017, Proch transferred to Duke University, where he scored 28 goals and recorded 9 assists over three seasons with the Blue Devils. In his junior year, he was named to the second team of the NCAA Men's Soccer All-American Team.

=== Professional ===
Proch began his soccer career in the academy of U.S. Baone, before joining the academy of F.C. Südtirol, in Italy's Serie C. He spent two years on loan with U.S. Dro in Serie D playing 57 games and scoring 7 goals, before moving to the United States in the summer of 2016.

After going undrafted in the 2020 MLS SuperDraft, Proch signed with North Carolina FC of the USL Championship on 6 February 2020. He made his debut for the side on 7 March 2020, as a substitute in their match against Louisville City FC.

On 10 December 2020, Proch signed with Caldiero Terme of Italy's Serie D.

== Personal life ==
Proch grew up in Arco in northern Italy, before leaving for North Carolina to play collegiate soccer. At Duke, Proch majored in policy journalism and media studies. His brother, Davide, also plays soccer as a forward. He plays for S.S. Benacense in the sixth level of Italian football.
