= 2018 Kentucky Wildcats men's soccer team =

American college soccer season

2018 Kentucky Wildcats men's soccer

Conference USA Regular Season Champions Conference USA Tournament Champions

NCAA Tournament, Elite Eight
- Conference: Conference USA
- U. Soc. Coaches poll: No. 3
- TopDrawerSoccer.com: No. 3
- Record: 19–2–1 (7–1–0 C-USA)
- Head coach: Johan Cedergren (7th season)
- Assistant coaches: Josh Oldroyd (1st season); Chase Wileman (4th season)
- Captain: J. J. Williams
- Home stadium: Wendell & Vickie Bell Soccer Complex

2018 Conference USA men's soccer standings
| | Conf. | | | | | Overall |
| Team | W | | L | | T | W | | L | | T |
|---|---|---|---|---|---|---|---|---|---|---|
| No. 5 Kentucky ‡ | 7 | – | 1 | – | 0 | 18 | – | 2 | – | 1 |
| No. 20 Charlotte + | 6 | – | 2 | – | 0 | 14 | – | 5 | – | 2 |
| Old Dominion | 6 | – | 2 | – | 0 | 11 | – | 5 | – | 2 |
| FIU | 5 | – | 3 | – | 0 | 7 | – | 10 | – | 0 |
| Marshall | 3 | – | 3 | – | 2 | 8 | – | 9 | – | 3 |
| UAB | 2 | – | 5 | – | 1 | 6 | – | 9 | – | 3 |
| New Mexico | 2 | – | 5 | – | 1 | 4 | – | 12 | – | 1 |
| South Carolina | 2 | – | 6 | – | 0 | 7 | – | 10 | – | 0 |
| Florida Atlantic | 1 | – | 7 | – | 0 | 2 | – | 13 | – | 0 |
‡ – 2018 CUSA Tournament champion + – Invited to the 2018 NCAA Division I Men's Soccer Championship; As of December 11, 2018; Rankings from United Soccer Coaches

The 2018 Kentucky Wildcats men's soccer team represented the University of Kentucky during the 2018 NCAA Division I men's soccer season. It was the 28th season of the university fielding a men's varsity soccer program, and their 14th season playing in Conference USA as an associate member since their main conference, the Southeastern Conference does not sponsor men's varsity soccer.

The 2018 season proved to be the program's most successful season ever. Kentucky finished the regular season ranked third in the United Soccer Coaches men's soccer poll, as well as the Conference USA Men's Soccer Tournament and regular season champions. The program made their deepest run in the NCAA Tournament, reaching the Elite Eight before being eliminated by Maryland.

== Background ==
During the 2017 season, Kentucky finished with an 8–6–4 overall record and a 4–2–2 record in Conference USA matches. An early season surge had the Wildcats ranked as high as 13th in the nation. A dip in form saw the Wildcats fall out of the rankings and eventually out of the NCAA Tournament picture. Kentucky were seeded third in the 2017 Conference USA Men's Soccer Tournament, where they were upset by Marshall, 0–1, in the quarterfinals. They did not receive an at-large bid to the 2017 NCAA Division I Men's Soccer Tournament.

== Squad ==
=== Roster ===
Updated November 13, 2018

Note: Flags indicate national team as defined under FIFA eligibility rules; some limited exceptions apply. Players may hold more than one non-FIFA nationality.

| No. | Pos. | Nation | Player |
|---|---|---|---|
| 1 | GK | (United States) USA | Jack Hudson |
| 3 | DF | (India) IND | Keyarash Namjoupanah |
| 4 | MF | (United States) USA | Sam Stockton |
| 5 | DF | (Scotland) SCO | Leon Jones |
| 6 | DF | (Democratic Republic of the Congo) COD | Aimé Mabika |
| 7 | FW | (United States) USA | J. J. Williams |
| 8 | MF | (Germany) GER | Marcel Meinzer |
| 9 | FW | (Costa Rica) CRC | Jason Reyes |
| 10 | MF | (Norway) NOR | Nicolai Fremstad |
| 12 | GK | (United States) USA | Jackson Hawthorne |
| 14 | FW | (United States) USA | Daniel Evans |
| 15 | DF | (Canada) CAN | Brock Lindow |
| 16 | MF | (United States) USA | Robert Screen |

| No. | Pos. | Nation | Player |
|---|---|---|---|
| 17 | DF | (United States) USA | Elijah Borneo |
| 18 | MF | (United States) USA | Bailey Rouse |
| 20 | DF | (United States) USA | John Michael Bandy |
| 21 | DF | (United Arab Emirates) UAE | Kalil El-Medkhar |
| 22 | DF | (United States) USA | Tanner Hummel |
| 23 | MF | (United States) USA | Cole Guindon |
| 24 | GK | (Honduras) HON | Enrique Facusse |
| 25 | FW | (United States) USA | Clay Holstad |
| 26 | DF | (United States) USA | Nicholas Blassou |
| 27 | DF | (United States) USA | Luis Hernandez |
| 28 | MF | (United States) USA | Colin Innes |
| 29 | DF | (United States) USA | Matt Mazur |
| 30 | MF | (United States) USA | Ian Farquhar |

=== Team management ===
| Position | Staff |
|---|---|
| Head coach | Johan Cedergren |
| Assistant coach | Chase Wileman |
| Assistant coach | Josh Oldroyd |
| Athletic trainer | Taylor Eavenson |
| Director of Operations | Marcus Aldaba |

== Schedule ==
| Date Time, TV | Rank^{#} | Opponent^{#} | Result | Record | Site (Attendance) City, State |
Regular season
| August 24*; 7:30 pm, SECN+ | | DePaul | W 1–0 | 1–0–0 | Bell Soccer Complex (1,559); Lexington, KY |
| August 31*; 7:35 pm, SECN+ | | Columbia | W 1–0 | 2–0–0 | Bell Soccer Complex (1,252); Lexington, KY |
| September 4*; 7:35 pm, SECN+ | | No. 6 Louisville; Rivalry | W 3–0 | 3–0–0 | Bell Soccer Complex (1,827); Lexington, KY |
| September 8; 7:00 pm | | at UAB | W 2–0 | 4–0–0 (1–0–0) | BBVA Compass Field (902); Birmingham, AL |
| September 11*; 7:05 pm | No. 6 | at Xavier | T 0–0 ^{2OT} | 4–0–1 | XU Soccer Complex (640); Cincinnati, OH |
| September 18*; 7:00 pm | No. 7 | at Lipscomb | W 3–2 ^{OT} | 5–0–1 | Lipscomb Soccer Complex (394); Nashville, TN |
| September 21; 7:05 pm, SECN+ | No. 7 | No. 18 Charlotte | W 1–0 | 6–0–1 (2–0–0) | Bell Soccer Complex (1,572); Lexington, KY |
| September 26*; 7:35 pm, SECN+ | No. 7 | East Tennessee State | W 3–0 | 7–0–1 | Bell Soccer Complex (900); Lexington, KY |
| September 29; 7:00 pm | No. 7 | at South Carolina; SEC Derby | W 2–1 | 8–0–1 (3–0–0) | Stone Stadium (1,557); Columbia, SC |
| October 3*; 7:05 pm, WatchESPN | No. 4 | No. 2 Indiana; Rivalry | W 3–0 | 9–0–1 | Bell Soccer Complex (3,503); Lexington, KY |
| October 7; 7:00 pm, CUSA.tv | No. 4 | at FIU | L 2–3 | 9–1–1 (3–1–0) | FIU Soccer Stadium (435); Miami, FL |
| October 13; 7:05 pm, SECN+ | No. 4 | Marshall | W 1–0 ^{2OT} | 10–1–1 (4–1–0) | Bell Soccer Complex (1,470); Lexington, KY |
| October 16*; 7:05 pm, BTN+ | No. 3 | at Ohio State | W 3–0 | 11–1–1 | Jesse Owens Memorial Stadium (487); Columbus, OH |
| October 21; 1:05 pm, SECN+ | No. 3 | New Mexico | W 6–1 | 12–1–1 (5–1–0) | Bell Soccer Complex (1,088); Lexington, KY |
| October 24*; 7:05 pm, SECN+ | No. 3 | Evansville | W 4–0 | 13–1–1 | Bell Soccer Complex (1,016); Lexington, KY |
| October 28; 1:00 pm, CUSA.tv | No. 3 | at Florida Atlantic | W 2–1 | 14–1–1 (6–1–0) | FAU Soccer Stadium (265); Boca Raton, FL |
| November 2; 7:05 pm | No. 3 | No. 24 Old Dominion; Senior Night | W 3–0 | 15–1–1 (7–1–0) | Bell Soccer Complex (1,813); Lexington, KY |
Conference USA Tournament
| November 9; 4:30 pm, ESPN3 | (1) No. 3 | vs. (5) Marshall; Semifinals | W 2–1 | 16–1–1 | Transamerica Field; Charlotte, NC |
| November 11; 1:00 pm, ESPN3 | (1) No. 3 | at (3) No. 14 Charlotte; Championship | W 1–0 | 17–1–1 | Transamerica Field (1,008); Charlotte, NC |
NCAA Tournament
| November 18; 4:00 pm, SECN+ | (3) No. 3 | No. 21 Portland; Second Round | W 4–0 | 18–1–1 | Bell Soccer Complex (1,831); Lexington, KY |
| November 24; 7:05 pm, SECN+ | (3) No. 3 | Lipscomb; Third Round | W 2–1 | 19–1–1 | Bell Soccer Complex (1,939); Lexington, KY |
| November 30; 7:00 pm, SECN+ | (3) No. 3 | (11) No. 15 Maryland; Quarterfinals | L 0–1 | 19–2–1 | Bell Soccer Complex (3,228); Lexington, KY |
*Non-conference game. ^{#}Rankings from United Soccer Coaches. (#) Tournament seedings in parentheses.
