= Javier Carbonell =

Spanish footballer

Personal information
- Full name: Javier Carbonell Piserra
- Date of birth: 23 March 1997 (age 29)
- Place of birth: Madrid, Spain
- Height: 1.83 m (6 ft 0 in)
- Position: Forward

Team information
- Current team: Zamora
- Number: 17

Youth career
- Atlético Madrid

College career
Years	Team	Apps	(Gls)
2015–2016	Camilo José Cela		
2017–2018	Georgia Southern Eagles	33	(19)
2019	Camilo José Cela		

Senior career*
Years	Team	Apps	(Gls)
2019–2021	Villanueva Pardillo	26	(12)
2021–2022	Las Rozas	37	(20)
2022–2023	Unión Adarve	30	(6)
2023–2024	Getafe B	33	(8)
2024–2025	Ourense	36	(13)
2025–	Zamora	37	(6)
- * Club domestic league appearances and goals as of 25 May 2026

Javier Carbonell Piserra (born 23 March 1997), sometimes known as Carbo, is a Spanish footballer who plays as a forward for Primera Federación club Zamora.

== Career ==
Carbonell was born in Madrid, and played for hometown side Atlético Madrid as a youth. On 14 July 2017, after two years playing college football at the Universidad Camilo José Cela, he moved to the United States and joined the Georgia Southern University to play for the Georgia Southern Eagles.

Carbonell scored 15 goals for the Eagles in the 2018 season, being named in the Sun Belt Conference All-Tournament Team and also receiving the Player of the Year award. He subsequently returned to the Camilo José Cela to play in the 2019 European Universities Football Championships, before signing for FC Villanueva del Pardillo in the Preferente de Madrid, but only featured in one match before suffering a knee injury.

Back to action during the 2020–21 Tercera División, Carbonell scored 12 times for Villanueva as the club suffered relegation. In July 2021, he moved to Las Rozas CF in Tercera División RFEF, after a partnership with Villanueva was established.

On 25 July 2022, after scoring a career-best 20 goals during the campaign, Carbonell signed for AD Unión Adarve in Segunda Federación. Roughly one year later, he agreed to a deal with Getafe CF, being assigned to the reserves also in division four.

On 28 June 2024, Primera Federación side Ourense CF announced the signing of Carbonell. He finished the season with 13 goals, being the club's top scorer and the second-best of their group.
