= 2018 Conference USA men's soccer tournament =

USA Men's Soccer Tournament in 2018

- Classification: Division I
- Teams: 7
- Matches: 6
- Site: Transamerica Field; Charlotte, North Carolina
- Champions: Kentucky (1st title)
- Winning coach: Johan Cedergren (1st title)
- Broadcast: ESPN3

2018 Conference USA men's soccer standings
| | Conf. | | | | | Overall |
| Team | W | | L | | T | W | | L | | T |
|---|---|---|---|---|---|---|---|---|---|---|
| No. 5 Kentucky ‡ | 7 | – | 1 | – | 0 | 18 | – | 2 | – | 1 |
| No. 20 Charlotte + | 6 | – | 2 | – | 0 | 14 | – | 5 | – | 2 |
| Old Dominion | 6 | – | 2 | – | 0 | 11 | – | 5 | – | 2 |
| FIU | 5 | – | 3 | – | 0 | 7 | – | 10 | – | 0 |
| Marshall | 3 | – | 3 | – | 2 | 8 | – | 9 | – | 3 |
| UAB | 2 | – | 5 | – | 1 | 6 | – | 9 | – | 3 |
| New Mexico | 2 | – | 5 | – | 1 | 4 | – | 12 | – | 1 |
| South Carolina | 2 | – | 6 | – | 0 | 7 | – | 10 | – | 0 |
| Florida Atlantic | 1 | – | 7 | – | 0 | 2 | – | 13 | – | 0 |
‡ – 2018 CUSA Tournament champion + – Invited to the 2018 NCAA Division I Men's Soccer Championship; As of December 11, 2018; Rankings from United Soccer Coaches

The 2018 Conference USA men's soccer tournament (known as the 2018 Air Force Reserve Men's Soccer Championship for sponsorship purposes) was the 24th edition of the tournament. Kentucky received Conference USA's automatic berth into the 2018 NCAA Division I Men's Soccer Championship by winning the final match over Charlotte by a score of 1–0.

== Seeding ==
The top seven programs based on conference record will qualify for the CUSA Tournament.

| No. | School | W | L | T | PCT. | Pts. |
|---|---|---|---|---|---|---|
| 1 | Kentucky | 7 | 1 | 0 | .875 | 21 |
| 2 | Old Dominion | 6 | 2 | 0 | .750 | 18 |
| 3 | Charlotte | 6 | 2 | 0 | .750 | 18 |
| 4 | FIU | 5 | 3 | 0 | .625 | 15 |
| 5 | Marshall | 3 | 3 | 2 | .500 | 11 |
| 6 | UAB | 2 | 5 | 1 | .313 | 7 |
| 7 | New Mexico | 2 | 5 | 1 | .313 | 7 |

== Bracket ==
Quarterfinals; Wed., Nov. 7
4 | FIU | 1
5 | Marshall | 2
2 | Old Dominion | 4
7 | New Mexico | 0
3 | Charlotte (OT) | 1
6 | UAB | 0

Semifinals; Fri., Nov. 9
1 | Kentucky | 2
5 | Marshall | 1
2 | Old Dominion | 2
3 | Charlotte | 4

Finals; Sun., Nov. 11
1 | Kentucky | 1
3 | Charlotte | 0

== Results ==
=== Quarterfinals ===
November 7
2:00 p.m. EST

| No. 4 FIU | 1–2 | No. 5 Marshall |
|---|---|---|
| Hassan 75' | Report | Rylah 47'; Osmanu 84' |

Transamerica Field, Charlotte, NC
Attendance: 0
Referee: Nima Saghafi

November 7
4:30 p.m. EST

| No. 2 Old Dominion | 4–0 | No. 7 New Mexico |
|---|---|---|
| Wilschrey 55'; Klosterhalfen 56'; Kroschwitz 75'; Hauret 88' | Report |

Transamerica Field, Charlotte, NC
Attendance: 0
Referee: Mark Kadlecki

November 7
7:00 p.m. EST

| No. 3 Charlotte | 1–0 (a.e.t.) | No. 6 UAB |
|---|---|---|
| Popp 93' | Report |

Transamerica Field, Charlotte, NC
Attendance: 564
Referee: Michael Lavergne

=== Semifinals ===
November 9
4:30 p.m. EST

| No. 1 Kentucky | 2–1 | No. 5 Marshall |
|---|---|---|
| Elmedkhar 8'; Williams 18' | Report | Rylah 61' |

Transamerica Field, Charlotte, NC
Attendance: 0
Referee: Hilario Grajeda

November 9
7:00 p.m. EST

| No. 2 Old Dominion | 2–4 | No. 3 Charlotte |
|---|---|---|
| Dogan 43'; Wilschrey 45' | | Popp 42'; Montgomery 56'; Brito 80'; Bruce 85' |

Transamerica Field, Charlotte, NC

=== Championship ===
November 11
1:00 p.m. EST

| No. 1 Kentucky | 1-0 | No. 3 Charlotte |
|---|---|---|
| JJ Williams 47' | Report |

Transamerica Field, Charlotte, NC
Attendance: 1,008
Referee: Robert Sibiga

== Statistics ==
=== Goals ===
| Rank | Player | College | Goals |
|---|---|---|---|
| 1 | J.P. Rylah | Marshall | 2 |
| 1 | Max Wilschrey | Old Dominion | 2 |
| 1 | Preston Popp | Charlotte | 2 |
| 1 | JJ Williams | Kentucky | 2 |
| 2 | Adam Hassan | Florida International | 1 |
| 2 | Illal Osmanu | Marshall | 1 |
| 2 | Niko Klosterhalfen | Old Dominion | 1 |
| 2 | Hans Kroschwitz | Old Dominion | 1 |
| 2 | Sebastien Hauret | Old Dominion | 1 |
| 2 | Kalili Elmedkhar | Kentucky | 1 |
| 2 | Deniz Dogan | Old Dominion | 1 |
| 2 | Callum Montgomery | Charlotte | 1 |
| 2 | Joe Brito | Charlotte | 1 |
| 2 | Daniel Bruce | Charlotte | 1 |

== All Tournament Team ==
**2018 C-USA Men's Soccer All-Tournament team**
- **JJ Williams, Kentucky** (Offensive)
- **Enrique Facusse, Kentucky** (Defensive)
- Kalil ElMedkhar, Kentucky
- Tanner Hummel, Kentucky
- Preston Popp, Charlotte
- Callum Montgomery, Charlotte
- Teddy Chaouche, Charlotte
- Niko Klosterhalfen, Old Dominion
- Max Wilschrey, Old Dominion
- JP Rylah, Marshall
- Jan-Erik Leinhos, Marshall
MVP in Bold
