= Frank Olszewski =

Current position
- Title: Head coach
- Team: Notre Dame Gators
- Conference: United East Conference

Biographical details
- Born: 1956 (age 69–70)

Playing career
- 1975–1978: Johns Hopkins
- Position: Defender

Coaching career (HC unless noted)
- 1982–2012: Towson University
- 2016–2017: Davis & Elkins College
- 2018–2022: Saint Francis (PA)

Frank Olszewski (born 1956) is the head men's soccer coach at Notre Dame of Maryland University in Baltimore, Maryland. He is formerly the head men's soccer coach at Saint Francis University.

He was named United East Coach of the Year in the inaugural season of the program, as well as, leading the team to the league playoffs and having four players named to All Conference teams. The Gators have qualified for the league playoffs in each of their first three seasons. In 2025 the team finished 4th in the United East conference, one of the largest leagues in the country with 13 teams. His teams have won over 400 games throughout his career.

== Career ==
Olszewski was the head men's soccer coach at Towson University until 2013 when the university decided to discontinue Men's Soccer. He coached the Tigers from 1982 to 2012. He has posted a career record of 345–230–65. He has won the most games of any coach in Towson's history and ranks 12th for active Division I coaches by number of games won and 37th in Division I all time. 2012 marked his 31st season as head coach of the program. He guided the Tigers to nine conference championship games, including four conference titles and four regular season titles. In 2001, Towson made its first ever NCAA Tournament appearance, after winning the American East Championship. That team made it to the second round defeating James Madison by a score of 4–1 before losing to eventual National Champions, UNC. In 2006, the Tigers reached the round of 16, before losing 2–1 to third ranked Wake Forest. That team was one of sixteen seeded teams in the country and defeated Fairfield University, 2–0 at the Towson Center Soccer Complex before a school record crowd. During his coaching career he has helped to develop over 60 domestic professional players and 14 international players, as well as, 18 players who have played on various national teams.

In 2016 as coach at Davis and Elkins, the Senators were the regular season champions in the Great Midwest Athletic Conference, where he was also named as coach of the year. In 2017, he led the Senators to the second round of the NCAA Tournament with a record of 14-3-4 going out to #5 ranked Ohio Valley University after 1-1 draw on penalty kicks and finishing with a top 20 national ranking.

In his four years at St. Francis, the Red Flash have an overall record of 32-24-7, 3rd highest win total in school history, and a Northeast Conference record of 18-11-5, finishing in second place in 2018 and as top tournament seed in 2019. The university opted not to compete in 2020 due to Covid and pandemic circumstances. The Red Flash returned to the playoffs in 2022.

His teams have qualified for the United Soccer Coaches Academic Achievement award for the past nine consecutive years.

In addition, he has worked with FC Koln of the Bundesliga as a scout for talent in the United States.

He has earned six conference coach of the year awards throughout his career, with the most recent being in 2023. He was also named as the NSCAA South Atlantic Coach of the Year and a nominee for National Coach of the Year in 2006. He has also been named University Coach of the year on seven occasions, a school record. His teams have had winning records in 15 out of his past 16 seasons, including 10 straight at one point. His 2006 team proved to be the best in school history, as the team went 15–2–3, including a perfect 10–0–1 in CAA, and finished the season ranked 15th nationally, the highest regular season ranking in school history. His teams have been nationally ranked in nine different seasons. He is a member of the Maryland Soccer Hall of Fame. He played college soccer at Johns Hopkins University (a Final Four participant), a member of the U.S. Olympic pool from 1977 to 1980, and was drafted by New York in the SSL in 1978. Additionally, he was an Assistant Coach with the Maryland Bays during the 1990 season when they captured the APSL championship. In 1982, when he began his head coaching career, he was the youngest Division I head coach in the country at the age of 26 and has attained his USSF "A" License.
