= Siad Haji =

Somali footballer (born 1999)

Personal information
- Full name: Abdulkadir Abdi Haji
- Date of birth: 1 December 1999 (age 26)
- Place of birth: Kakuma, Kenya
- Height: 5 ft 8 in (1.73 m)
- Position: Winger

Youth career
- –2016: New Hampshire Classics

College career
Years	Team	Apps	(Gls)
2016	New England Pilgrims	14	(9)
2017–2018	VCU Rams	35	(7)

Senior career*
Years	Team	Apps	(Gls)
2017–2018	Portland Timbers U23s	21	(5)
2019–2022	San Jose Earthquakes	14	(0)
2019–2020	→ Reno 1868 (loan)	18	(1)
2022	San Jose Earthquakes II	7	(1)
2023	FC Tulsa	18	(0)
2024	Vermont Green	4	(0)

International career^{‡}
2013–2014	United States U15		
2014–2015	United States U17		
2015–2016	United States U19		
2022–	Somalia	2	(0)
- * Club domestic league appearances and goals as of 4 September 2025 ‡ National team caps and goals as of 3 April 2022

Abdulkadir Abdi "Siad" Haji (Arabic: عبد القادر عبدي "سعيد" حاجي; Osmanya: 𐒖𐒁𐒆𐒚𐒐𐒏𐒖𐒆𐒘𐒇 𐒖𐒁𐒆𐒘 “𐒈𐒖𐒘𐒆” 𐒔𐒖𐒃𐒘; born 1 December 1999) is a Somali professional footballer who plays as a winger. Born a Somali refugee in Kenya and a former United States youth international, he plays for the Somalia national team.

== Early life ==
Haji was born in a Kenyan refugee camp, his parents having fled Somalia. In 2004, they moved to New Hampshire. Haji settled in a refugee community near downtown Manchester, New Hampshire, played youth soccer for the New Hampshire Classics, and was offered a spot on the New England Revolution youth academy's under-16 team. However, the distance and financial logistics made it difficult for him to accept a spot in the academy. He would continue to play for the Classics through high school.

== Career ==
=== Youth and college ===
Upon graduating, Haji did not have the eligibility to play in NCAA Division I, so he played for New England College in NCAA Division III during his first year. With the Pilgrims, he scored nine times in fourteen appearances. Between Haji's first and second years, he transferred from New England College to Virginia Commonwealth University where he was a starting midfielder for the VCU Rams men's soccer team, and earned the Atlantic 10 Midfielder of the Year award in 2018.

=== Professional ===
Haji played two seasons in USL League Two (then known as the Premier Development League) with the Portland Timbers U23s. He made 21 appearances over the two seasons, scoring five goals.

On 3 January 2019, he signed a Generation Adidas contract with Major League Soccer and was eligible for the 2019 MLS SuperDraft. Haji, by many mock drafts, was considered a top five draft pick, and some cases, the first overall draft pick. He was ultimately drafted second overall in the 2019 MLS SuperDraft by the San Jose Earthquakes, the highest ever drafted alumnus from VCU.

Ahead of the 2019 USL Championship season, Haji went on loan to Reno 1868. He made his professional debut and his Reno debut on 16 March 2019, in a 2–1 win against Austin Bold, subbing on at halftime for Gilbert Fuentes.

Haji was released by San Jose following the 2022 season.

On 19 January 2023, he signed a contract with USL Championship side FC Tulsa.

Haji joined fourth-tier side Vermont Green of the USL League Two on May 2, 2024.

=== International ===
He played for various youth teams for the United States. In 2020, he was called up by the Somalia national team ahead of their first games at home in Mogadishu.

In March 2022, he was called up to the Somalia national team. Haji debuted with Somalia in a 3–0 2023 Africa Cup of Nations qualification loss to Eswatini on 23 March 2022.
