= Mark Forrest =

English footballer

Personal information
- Date of birth: 3 December 1996 (age 29)
- Place of birth: London, England
- Position: Forward

College career
Years	Team	Apps	(Gls)
2015–2018	Lehigh Mountain Hawks	73	(41)

Senior career*
Years	Team	Apps	(Gls)
2017	Lehigh Valley United	7	(3)
2018	Reading United	5	(0)
2019–2020	Pittsburgh Riverhounds	18	(2)
- * Club domestic league appearances and goals as of 6 October 2020

Mark Forrest (born 3 December 1996) is an English professional footballer who plays as a forward.

== Career ==
=== College and amateur ===
Forrest played four years of college soccer at Lehigh University between 2015 and 2018, making 73 appearances, scoring 41 goals and tallying 21 assists.

Forrest also played with Premier Development League side Lehigh Valley United in 2017 and Reading United AC in 2018.

=== Professional ===
On 14 January 2019, Forrest was selected 77th overall in the 2019 MLS SuperDraft by Chicago Fire.

Forrest signed his first professional deal with USL Championship club Pittsburgh Riverhounds SC on 29 March 2019.

== Personal ==
Forrest was born in England, before his family moved to Douglassville, Pennsylvania when he was 5 years old. He is a 2015 graduate of The Hill School
