= Austin Dewing =

American soccer player (born 1996)

Personal information
- Date of birth: December 30, 1996 (age 29)
- Place of birth: Colorado Springs, Colorado, United States
- Height: 1.72 m (5 ft 8 in)
- Position: Forward

College career
Years	Team	Apps	(Gls)
2015–2018	Air Force Falcons	78	(29)

Senior career*
Years	Team	Apps	(Gls)
2018	Colorado Pride Switchbacks U23	3	(2)
2019–2021	Colorado Springs Switchbacks	29	(1)
- * Club domestic league appearances and goals as of May 21, 2021

Austin Dewing (born December 30, 1996) is an American soccer player. He is an officer in the United States Air Force.

== Career ==
=== College ===
Dewing played college soccer at the United States Air Force Academy between 2015 and 2018. While with the Falcons, Dewing made 78 appearances, scoring 29 goals and tallying 19 assists.

While at college, Dewing also appeared for USL PDL team Colorado Pride Switchbacks U23 during their 2018 season.

=== Professional ===
On June 14, 2019, Dewing joined USL Championship side Colorado Springs Switchbacks. On May 21, 2021, it was announced that Dewing had been reassigned by the U.S. Air Force, and would leave the club to complete his training as a pilot.
