= Wouter Verstraaten =

Dutch footballer

Personal information
- Date of birth: 10 March 1996 (age 30)
- Place of birth: Heeze, The Netherlands
- Height: 1.90 m (6 ft 3 in)
- Position: Defender

Team information
- Current team: Geldrop

Youth career
- Geldrop
- 2004–2015: PSV Eindhoven

College career
Years	Team	Apps	(Gls)
2016–2018	Pacific Tigers	56	(5)

Senior career*
Years	Team	Apps	(Gls)
2015–2016	Eindhoven	2	(0)
2018	Portland Timbers U23s	6	(0)
2019	Geldrop		
2019–2020	Consett	5	(1)
2020–2021	South Shields	17	(1)
2021–2022	Achilles Veen	7	(0)
2022–	Geldrop		
- * Club domestic league appearances and goals as of 24 December 2022

Wouter Verstraaten (born 10 March 1996) is a Dutch footballer. Besides the Netherlands, he has played in the United States and England.

== Biography ==
Verstraaten enrolled at Durham University in September 2019 as a postgraduate sport scholar in the business school, and in addition to playing for the university football team also made appearances for Consett and South Shields – signing a full-time contract for the latter in May 2020.

== Career statistics ==
=== Club ===
As of 24 December 2022

Club	Season	League			Cup		Other		Total	
Club	Season	Division	Apps	Goals	Apps	Goals	Apps	Goals	Apps	Goals
Eindhoven	2015–16	Eerste Divisie	2	0	0	0	0	0	2	0
Portland Timbers U23s	2018	PDL	6	0	0	0	0	0	6	0
Consett	2019–20	Northern Football League	5	1	0	0	5 (Note: One appearance in the Durham Challenge Cup, one appearance in the League Cup and three appearances in the FA Vase)	0	10	1
South Shields	2019–20	Northern Premier League	11	1	0	0	2 (Note: Appearances in the Integro League Cup)	0	13	1
South Shields	2020–21	Northern Premier League	6	0	3 (Note: Appearances in FA Cup qualification)	0	1 (Note: Appearances in FA Trophy qualification)	0	10	0
South Shields	Total		17	1	3	0	3	0	23	1
Achilles Veen	2021–22	Hoofdklasse	7	0	1 (Note: Appearances in the KNVB Cup)	1	0	0	8	1
Career total			37	2	4	1	8	0	49	3
