= Tucker Bone =

American soccer player (born 1996)

Personal information
- Date of birth: January 23, 1996 (age 30)
- Place of birth: Tacoma, Washington, U.S.
- Height: 1.80 m (5 ft 11 in)
- Position: Attacking midfielder

Youth career
- 2005–2012: Placer United
- 2013–2014: Sacramento United

College career
Years	Team	Apps	(Gls)
2015–2018	Air Force Falcons	81	(25)

Senior career*
Years	Team	Apps	(Gls)
2018	Colorado Pride Switchbacks U23	8	(0)
2019	Colorado Springs Switchbacks	16	(1)
2020	Reno 1868	14	(4)
2021	Sacramento Republic	12	(5)
Total		50	(10)
- * Club domestic league appearances and goals as of April 1, 2023

Tucker Bone (born January 23, 1996) is an American former professional soccer player who last played for USL Championship side Sacramento Republic.

== Career ==
=== College ===
Bone played college soccer at the United States Air Force Academy between 2015 and 2018. While with the Falcons, Bone made 81 appearances, scoring 25 goals and tallying 22 assists.

While at college, Bone also appeared for USL PDL team Colorado Pride Switchbacks U23 during their 2018 season.

=== Professional ===
On January 11, 2019, Bone was drafted 20th overall in the 2019 MLS SuperDraft by Seattle Sounders FC. Due to his potential service commitments with the United States Air Force, Seattle would have to demonstrate a serious interest in Bone for him to qualify for a special military program that allows active duty service members to keep training as elite level athletes.

After not signing with Seattle, Bone joined USL Championship side Colorado Springs Switchbacks on June 14, 2019.

On December 10, 2019, Bone joined USL Championship side Reno 1868 ahead of their 2020 season. Reno folded their team on November 6, 2020, due to the financial impact of the COVID-19 pandemic.

Bone signed with USL Championship side Sacramento Republic on January 19, 2021.
