= Saint Mary's Gaels men's soccer =

American college soccer team

- Founded: 1978; 48 years ago
- University: Saint Mary's College of California
- Head coach: Adam Cooper (15th season)
- Conference: WCC
- Location: Moraga, California
- Stadium: Saint Mary's Stadium (capacity: 5,500)
- Nickname: Gaels
- Colors: Navy, red, and silver
Home	Away

NCAA Tournament Round of 16
- 2018

NCAA Tournament Round of 32
- 2018, 2019

NCAA Tournament appearances
- 2009, 2018, 2019

Conference Regular Season championships
- 2018, 2019

The Saint Mary's Gaels men's soccer program represents Saint Mary's College of California in all NCAA Division I men's college soccer competitions. Founded in 1978, the Gaels compete in the West Coast Conference. The Gaels are coached by Adam Cooper, who has coached the program for 15 years. Saint Mary's play their home matches at Saint Mary's Stadium.

== NCAA tournament results ==
Season	Seed	Round	Rival	Res.	Score
2009	—N/a	First round	Stanford	L	0–3
2018	8	Second round	Oregon State	W	1–0
2018	8	Third round	Stanford	L	0–0 (2–4 p)
2019	12	Second round	UC Santa Barbara	L	0–4
