= 2019 MLS SuperDraft =

College draft for soccer teams

General information
- Sport: Soccer
- Date: January 11, 2019
- Location: Chicago, Illinois
- Network: MLSSoccer.com

Overview
- 75 total selections in 4 rounds
- League: Major League Soccer
- Teams: 24
- First selection: Frankie Amaya, FC Cincinnati
- Most selections (8): FC Cincinnati
- Fewest selections (0): Philadelphia Union

The 2019 MLS SuperDraft was the twentieth SuperDraft conducted by Major League Soccer. The SuperDraft is typically held in conjunction with the annual January United Soccer Coaches convention, which in 2019 was held in Chicago, Illinois. The first two rounds of the 2019 SuperDraft were held on January 11, 2019. Rounds three and four were held via conference call on January 14, 2019.

== Format ==
The SuperDraft format has remained constant throughout its history and closely resembles that of the NFL draft:

1. Any expansion teams receive the first picks. In May 2018, MLS named FC Cincinnati as an expansion team to begin play in 2019.
2. Non-playoff clubs receive the next picks in reverse order of prior season finish.
3. Teams that made the MLS Cup Playoffs are then ordered by which round of the playoffs they are eliminated.
4. The winners of the MLS Cup are given the last selection, and the losers the penultimate selection.

== Player selection ==
Key
*	Denotes player who has been selected for an MLS Best XI team
^	Member of 2019 Generation Adidas class
†	Player who was named to an MLS Best XI and Generation Adidas

Positions key
GK	Goalkeeper	DF	Defender	MF	Midfielder	FW	Forward

=== Round 1 ===
P	MLS team	Player	Pos.	College	Conference	Club team	Signed
1	FC Cincinnati	(United States) Frankie Amaya^	MF	UCLA	Pac-12	—N/a	(United States) FC Cincinnati
2	San Jose Earthquakes	(Somalia) Siad Haji^	MF	VCU	Atlantic 10	Portland Timbers U23s	(United States) San Jose Earthquakes
3	Orlando City SC	(Colombia) Santiago Patiño	FW	FIU	C-USA	Seattle Sounders FC U-23	(United States) Orlando City SC
4	FC Dallas (Note: No. 4: Colorado Rapids → FC Dallas. July 23, 2018: FC Dallas acquired a first-round selection in the 2019 SuperDraft, an international roster spot through the 2019 season, and forward Dominique Badji from Colorado Rapids in exchange for midfielder Kellyn Acosta, a first-round selection in the 2019 SuperDraft, and a second-round selection in the 2019 SuperDraft. FC Dallas also retains 50% of any international transfer value on Acosta until the closing of the 2020 summer transfer window.)	(Canada) Callum Montgomery	DF	Charlotte	C-USA	Victoria Highlanders	(United States) FC Dallas
5	Colorado Rapids (Note: No. 5: Chicago Fire → Colorado Rapids. January 11, 2019: Colorado Rapids acquired a first-round selection in the 2019 SuperDraft from Chicago Fire in exchange for a first-round selection in the 2019 SuperDraft (#15 overall) and $100,000 of general allocation money.)	(Brazil) Andre Shinyashiki	FW	Denver	Summit	Colorado Rapids U-23	(United States) Colorado Rapids
6	Toronto FC	(United States) Griffin Dorsey^	FW	Indiana	Big Ten	Colorado Rapids U-23	(Canada) Toronto FC
7	Minnesota United FC	(Canada) Dayne St. Clair^	GK	Maryland	Big Ten	New York Red Bulls U-23	(United States) Minnesota United FC
8	Houston Dynamo	(United States) Sam Junqua	DF	California	Pac-12	San Francisco Glens	(United States) Houston Dynamo
9	New England Revolution	(Canada) Tajon Buchanan†	FW	Syracuse	ACC	—N/a	(United States) New England Revolution
10	FC Dallas (Note: No. 10: Montreal Impact → FC Dallas. December 9, 2018: FC Dallas acquired a first-round selection in the 2019 SuperDraft and $75,000 in targeted allocation money from Montreal Impact in exchange for forward Maximiliano Urruti. FC Dallas also retains 50% of any international transfer value on Urruti before the first game of the 2019 season with additional future considerations beyond that.)	(United States) John Nelson^	DF	North Carolina	ACC	Tobacco Road FC	(United States) FC Dallas
11	New England Revolution (Note: No. 11: Vancouver Whitecaps FC → New England Revolution. December 10, 2017: New England Revolution acquired a first-round selection in the 2019 SuperDraft and a conditional second-round selection in the 2020 MLS SuperDraft from Vancouver Whitecaps FC in exchange for forward Kei Kamara.)	(United States) DeJuan Jones	MF	Michigan State	Big Ten	Lansing United	(United States) New England Revolution
12	New York City FC (Note: No. 12: LA Galaxy → New York City FC. January 11, 2019: New York City FC acquired a first-round selection in the 2019 SuperDraft from LA Galaxy in exchange for a first-round selection in the 2019 SuperDraft (#19 overall) and $75,000 of general allocation money.)	(United States) Luis Barraza	GK	Marquette	Big East	Chicago FC United	(United States) New York City FC
13	FC Cincinnati (Note: No. 13: Philadelphia Union → FC Cincinnati. January 9, 2019: FC Cincinnati acquired first-round (No. 13 overall), second-round (No. 29), second-round (No. 37), third-round (No. 61), and fourth-round (No. 85) selections in the 2019 MLS SuperDraft from Philadelphia Union in exchange for $150,000 in General Allocation Money. Should additional performance-based metrics be met, FC Cincinnati could send up to an additional $50,000 in General Allocation Money in 2020.)	(United States) Logan Gdula	DF	Wake Forest	ACC	Carolina Dynamo	(United States) FC Cincinnati
14	D.C. United	(United States) Akeem O'Connor-Ward	DF	Creighton	Big East	Chicago FC United	(United States) D.C. United
15	Minnesota United FC (Note: No. 15: FC Dallas → Colorado Rapids → Chicago Fire → Minnesota United. January 11, 2019: Minnesota United FC acquired a first-round selection in the 2019 SuperDraft from Chicago Fire in exchange for $50,000 in general allocation money. Earlier on January 11, 2019, Chicago had acquired this first-round selection and $100,000 in general allocation money from Colorado Rapids in exchange for a first-round selection (#5 overall) in the 2019 SuperDraft. On July 23, 2018, Colorado had acquired this first-round selection in the 2019 SuperDraft, a second-round selection in the 2019 SuperDraft, and midfielder Kellyn Acosta from FC Dallas in exchange for a first-round selection in the 2019 SuperDraft, an international roster spot through the 2019 season, and forward Dominique Badji. FC Dallas also retains 50% of any international transfer value on Acosta until the closing of the 2020 summer transfer window.)	(United States) Chase Gasper	DF	Maryland	Big Ten	FC Golden State Force	(United States) Minnesota United FC
16	New York Red Bulls (Note: No. 16: Los Angeles FC → FC Cincinnati → New York Red Bulls. January 11, 2019: New York Red Bulls acquired a first-round selection in the 2019 SuperDraft and a second-round selection in the 2019 SuperDraft from FC Cincinnati in exchange for $100,000 in general allocation money. On January 9, 2019, FC Cincinnati had acquired this first-round selection in the 2019 SuperDraft, $175,000 in General Allocation Money, and the initial 2020 Allocation Ranking from Los Angeles FC in exchange for a fourth-round selection in the 2019 SuperDraft and the initial 2020 Allocation Ranking. The 2020 Allocation Ranking swap will move to 2021 if FC Cincinnati is ranked in the top five spots in 2020.)	(Ghana) Roy Boateng	DF	UC Davis	Big West	San Francisco Glens	(United States) New York Red Bulls II (II Division)
17	Real Salt Lake	(United States) Sam Brown	MF	Harvard	Ivy	Portland Timbers U23s	(United States) Real Monarchs (II Division)
18	Columbus Crew SC	(United States) J. J. Williams^	FW	Kentucky	C-USA	Dayton Dutch Lions	(United States) Columbus Crew SC
19	LA Galaxy (Note: No. 19: New York City FC → LA Galaxy. January 11, 2019: LA Galaxy acquired a first-round selection in the 2019 SuperDraft and $75,000 in general allocation money from New York City FC in exchange for a first-round selection (#12 overall) in the 2019 SuperDraft.)	(Argentina) Emil Cuello	MF	SMU	American	Ocean City Nor'easters	(United States) LA Galaxy
20	Seattle Sounders FC	(United States) Tucker Bone	MF	Air Force	WAC	Colorado Pride Switchbacks U23	(United States) Colorado Springs Switchbacks (II Division)
21	Sporting Kansas City	(United States) Kamar Marriott	DF	Florida Gulf Coast	Atlantic Sun	Seattle Sounders FC U-23	
22	New York Red Bulls	(Germany) János Löbe	FW	Fordham	Atlantic 10	New York Red Bulls U-23	(United States) New York Red Bulls II (II Division)
23	Portland Timbers	(United States) Ryan Sierakowski	FW	Michigan State	Big Ten	Chicago FC United	(United States) Portland Timbers 2 (II Division)
24	Atlanta United FC	(Ghana) Anderson Asiedu	MF	UCLA	Pac-12	FC Golden State Force	(United States) Atlanta United FC

=== Round 2 ===
P	MLS team	Player	Pos.	College	Conference	Club team	Signed
25	New York Red Bulls (Note: No. 25: FC Cincinnati → New York Red Bulls. January 11, 2019: New York Red Bulls acquired a second-round selection in the 2019 SuperDraft and a first-round selection in the 2019 SuperDraft from FC Cincinnati in exchange for $100,000 in general allocation money.)	(United States) Sean Nealis	DF	Hofstra	CAA	Westchester Flames	(United States) New York Red Bulls
26	San Jose Earthquakes	(Mexico) Sergio Rivas	MF	Seattle	WAC	Albuquerque Sol	(United States) Reno 1868 (II Division)
27	Orlando City SC	(Canada) Kamal Miller	DF	Syracuse	ACC	Reading United	(United States) Orlando City SC
28	Colorado Rapids	(United States) Marcello Borges	DF	Michigan	Big Ten	Michigan Bucks	(United States) Detroit City FC (IV Division)
29	FC Cincinnati (Note: No. 29: Chicago Fire → Philadelphia Union → FC Cincinnati. January 9, 2019: FC Cincinnati acquired second-round (No. 29 overall), first-round (No. 13), second-round (No. 37), third-round (No. 61), and fourth-round (No. 85) selections in the 2019 MLS SuperDraft from Philadelphia Union in exchange for $150,000 in General Allocation Money. Should additional performance-based metrics be met, FC Cincinnati could send up to an additional $50,000 in General Allocation Money in 2020. On December 9, 2018, Philadelphia had acquired this second-round selection from Chicago Fire in exchange for midfielder Fabian Herbers.)	(United States) Tommy McCabe	MF	Notre Dame	ACC	Baltimore Bohemians	(United States) FC Cincinnati
30	FC Cincinnati (Note: No. 30: Toronto FC → FC Cincinnati. December 27, 2018: FC Cincinnati acquired a second-round selection in the 2019 SuperDraft and the #2 position in the MLS Allocation Order from Toronto FC in exchange for the #1 position in the MLS Allocation Order. Toronto used its allocation position to select defender Laurent Ciman.)	(United States) Jimmy Hague	GK	Michigan State	Big Ten	Michigan Bucks	(United States) FC Cincinnati
31	Minnesota United FC	(United States) Hassani Dotson	MF	Oregon State	Pac-12	Lane United	(United States) Minnesota United FC
32	New York Red Bulls (Note: No. 32: Houston Dynamo → Chicago Fire → New York Red Bulls. January 11, 2019: New York Red Bulls acquired a second-round selection in the 2019 SuperDraft from Chicago Fire in exchange for the MLS rights to midfielder Amando Moreno. On December 10, 2017, Chicago had acquired this second-round selection in the 2019 SuperDraft from Houston Dynamo in exchange for midfielder Arturo Álvarez.)	(United States) Rece Buckmaster	DF	Indiana	Big Ten	Chicago Fire U-23	(United States) New York Red Bulls II (II Division)
33	Houston Dynamo (Note: No. 33: New England Revolution → D.C. United → Houston Dynamo. January 11, 2019: Houston Dynamo acquired a second-round selection in the 2019 SuperDraft from D.C. United in exchange for goalkeeper Chris Seitz. Earlier on January 11, 2019, D.C. had acquired this second-round selection in the 2019 SuperDraft, a third-round selection in the 2020 MLS SuperDraft, and a fourth-round selection in the 2020 SuperDraft from New England Revolution in exchange for a second-round selection in the 2020 SuperDraft. All three 2020 SuperDraft picks traded are natural selections.)	(United States) Andrew Samuels	DF	Maryland	Big Ten	Tampa Bay Rowdies U23	(United States) RGVFC Toros (II Division)
34	Montreal Impact	(Germany) Amar Sejdič	MF	Maryland	Big Ten	Derby City Rovers	(Canada) Montreal Impact
35	Vancouver Whitecaps FC	(United States) Brendan McDonough	DF	Georgetown	Big East	—N/a	(Canada) Vancouver Whitecaps FC
36	LA Galaxy	(Benin) Don Tchilao	MF	Oregon State	Pac-12	Portland Timbers U23s	(United States) LA Galaxy II (II Division)
37	FC Cincinnati (Note: No. 37: Philadelphia Union → FC Cincinnati. January 9, 2019: FC Cincinnati acquired second-round (No. 37 overall), first-round (No. 13), second-round (No. 29), third-round (No. 61), and fourth-round (No. 85) selections in the 2019 MLS SuperDraft from Philadelphia Union in exchange for $150,000 in General Allocation Money. Should additional performance-based metrics be met, FC Cincinnati could send up to an additional $50,000 in General Allocation Money in 2020.)	(Germany) Ben Lundt	GK	Akron	MAC	Reading United	(United States) FC Cincinnati
38	Orlando City SC (Note: No. 38: D.C. United → Orlando City. December 19, 2018: Orlando City SC acquired a second-round selection in the 2019 SuperDraft from D.C. United in exchange for goalkeeper Earl Edwards Jr.)	(United States) Tommy Madden	MF	Charlotte	C-USA	—N/a	(United States) New Mexico United (II Division)
39	Toronto FC (Note: No. 39: FC Dallas → Colorado Rapids → Toronto FC. December 14, 2018: Toronto FC acquired a second-round selection in the 2019 SuperDraft from Colorado Rapids in exchange for goalkeeper Clint Irwin. On July 23, 2018, Colorado had acquired this second-round selection, a first-round selection in the 2019 SuperDraft, and midfielder Kellyn Acosta from FC Dallas in exchange for a first-round selection in the 2019 SuperDraft, an international roster spot through the 2019 season, and forward Dominique Badji. FC Dallas also retains 50% of any international transfer value on Acosta until the closing of the 2020 summer transfer window.)	(Scotland) Adam Wilson	MF	Louisville	ACC	Cincinnati Dutch Lions	
40	Los Angeles FC	(Jamaica) Peter-Lee Vassell	MF	—N/a	—N/a	Harbour View	(United States) Los Angeles FC
41	Real Salt Lake	(United States) Kyle Coffee	FW	Washington	Pac-12	Portland Timbers U23s	(United States) Real Monarchs (II Division)
42	Colorado Rapids (Note: No. 42: Columbus Crew → Colorado Rapids. December 15, 2017: Colorado Rapids acquired a second-round selection in the 2019 SuperDraft from Columbus Crew SC in exchange for midfielder Mike Grella.)	(United States) Jacob Hauser-Ramsey	DF	Connecticut	American	Myrtle Beach Mutiny	(United States) Memphis 901 (II Division)
43	New York City FC	(Somalia) Abdi Mohamed	DF	Akron	MAC	—N/a	(United States) New York City FC
44	Seattle Sounders FC	(Sweden) Joel Rydstrand	MF	Creighton	Big East	Lane United	(United States) Tacoma Defiance (II Division)
45	Sporting Kansas City	(United States) Camden Riley	MF	Pacific	WCC	Portland Timbers U23s	(United States) Swope Park Rangers (II Division)
46	San Jose Earthquakes (Note: No. 46: New York Red Bulls → San Jose Earthquakes. December 12, 2018: San Jose Earthquakes acquired a second-round selection in the 2019 SuperDraft and the #21 selection in the 2018 MLS Waiver Draft from New York Red Bulls in exchange for the #1 selection in the 2018 MLS Waiver Draft. New York used the waiver selection to choose midfielder Marcus Epps. San Jose did not utilize its waiver selection.)	(Guinea) Mamadi Camara	FW	Simon Fraser	GNAC (DII)	Calgary Foothills	(United States) Colorado Springs Switchbacks (II Division)
47	Portland Timbers	(Germany) Lennart Hein	DF	Saint Louis	Atlantic 10	Saint Louis Club Atletico	(England) Carshalton Athletic
48	Atlanta United FC	(United States) Amir Bashti	FW	Stanford	Pac-12	Burlingame Dragons	(United States) San Francisco Glens (IV Division)

=== Round 3 ===
P	MLS team	Player	Pos.	College	Conference	Club team	Signed
49	FC Cincinnati	(Jamaica) Rashawn Dally	MF	Quinnipiac	MAAC	Myrtle Beach Mutiny	(United States) FC Cincinnati
50	San Jose Earthquakes	(United States) Nathan Aune	DF	Seattle	WAC	Seattle Sounders FC U-23	(United States) Reno 1868 (II Division)
51	LA Galaxy (Note: No. 51: Orlando City → LA Galaxy. December 27, 2017: LA Galaxy acquired a third-round selection in the 2019 SuperDraft from Orlando City SC in exchange for forward Jose Villarreal.)	PASS	—N/a	—N/a	—N/a	—N/a	—N/a
52	LA Galaxy (Note: No. 52: Colorado Rapids → LA Galaxy. December 14, 2017: LA Galaxy acquired this third-round pick, originally a conditional fourth-round selection, in the 2019 SuperDraft from Colorado Rapids in exchange for forward Jack McBean.)	PASS	—N/a	—N/a	—N/a	—N/a	—N/a
53	Chicago Fire	(Ghana) Ebenezer Ackon	DF	Bowling Green	MAC	Lansing United	(United States) San Antonio FC (II Division)
54	Toronto FC	(Denmark) Patrick Bunk-Andersen	DF	Clemson	ACC	—N/a	(Canada) Toronto FC II (III Division)
55	Chicago Fire (Note: No. 55: Minnesota United → Chicago Fire. March 31, 2017: Chicago Fire acquired a third-round selection in the 2019 SuperDraft from Minnesota United FC in exchange for the number one position in the MLS waiver order. Minnesota used the waiver position to select midfielder Sam Cronin.)	(United States) Grant Stoneman	DF	Loyola Chicago	MVC	Chicago FC United	(United States) Lansing Ignite (III Division)
56	Houston Dynamo	(United States) Brad Dunwell	MF	Wake Forest	ACC	Michigan Bucks	(United States) RGVFC Toros (II Division)
57	New England Revolution	PASS	—N/a	—N/a	—N/a	—N/a	—N/a
58	Montreal Impact	PASS	—N/a	—N/a	—N/a	—N/a	—N/a
59	Orlando City SC (Note: No. 59: Vancouver Whitecaps FC → Orlando City SC. December 9, 2018: Orlando City SC acquired a third-round selection in the 2019 SuperDraft from Vancouver Whitecaps FC in exchange for midfielder PC.)	(United States) Scott DeVoss	DF	Denver	Summit	Colorado Rapids U23	(United States) Hartford Athletic (II Division)
60	LA Galaxy	PASS	—N/a	—N/a	—N/a	—N/a	—N/a
61	FC Cincinnati (Note: No. 61: Philadelphia Union → FC Cincinnati. January 9, 2019: FC Cincinnati acquired third-round (No. 61 overall), first-round (No. 13), second-round (No. 29), second-round (No. 37), and fourth-round (No. 85) selections in the 2019 MLS SuperDraft from Philadelphia Union in exchange for $150,000 in General Allocation Money. Should additional performance-based metrics be met, FC Cincinnati could send up to an additional $50,000 in General Allocation Money in 2020.)	PASS	—N/a	—N/a	—N/a	—N/a	—N/a
62	D.C. United	(Cape Verde) Geo Alves	MF	Vermont	America East	Real Boston Rams	(United States) New York Cosmos (IV Division)
63	FC Dallas	(United States) Eduvie Ikoba	FW	Dartmouth	Ivy	Black Rock FC	(Hungary) ZTE
64	Los Angeles FC	(Spain) Javier Pérez	MF	Pittsburgh	ACC	—N/a	(United States) Los Angeles FC
65	Real Salt Lake	PASS	—N/a	—N/a	—N/a	—N/a	—N/a
66	Columbus Crew SC	(Bermuda) Justin Donawa	MF	Dartmouth	Ivy	Black Rock FC	(England) Darlington
67	New York City FC	PASS	—N/a	—N/a	—N/a	—N/a	—N/a
68	Seattle Sounders FC	(United States) Aleks Berkolds	DF	San Diego State	Pac-12	Seattle Sounders FC U-23	(United States) Tacoma Defiance (II Division)
69	Sporting Kansas City	(United States) Franky Martinez	DF	UMass Lowell	America East	Lehigh Valley United	(United States) Los Angeles Force (III Division)
70	New York Red Bulls	(Ghana) Rashid Nuhu	GK	Fordham	Atlantic 10	New York Red Bulls U-23	(United States) New York Red Bulls II (II Division)
71	Portland Timbers	(United States) Francesco Moore	DF	Indiana	Big Ten	Chicago FC United	Retired
72	D.C. United (Note: No. 72: Atlanta United → D.C. United. August 8, 2017: D.C. United acquired a third-round selection in the 2019 SuperDraft from Atlanta United FC in exchange for defender Bobby Boswell.)	(Japan) Shinya Kadono	MF	California	Pac-12	San Francisco Glens	(United States) Loudoun United (II Division)

=== Round 4 ===
P	MLS team	Player	Pos.	College	Conference	Club team	Signed
73	Los Angeles FC (Note: No. 73: FC Cincinnati → Los Angeles FC. January 9, 2019: Los Angeles FC acquired a fourth-round selection in the 2019 SuperDraft and the initial 2020 Allocation Ranking from FC Cincinnati in exchange for a first-round selection in the 2019 SuperDraft, $175,000 in General Allocation Money, and the initial 2020 Allocation Ranking. The 2020 Allocation Ranking swap will move to 2021 if FC Cincinnati is ranked in the top five spots in 2020.)	(Mexico) Kevin Mendoza	MF	Liberty	Atlantic Sun	OKC Energy U23	(Mexico) Veracruz
74	San Jose Earthquakes	PASS	—N/a	—N/a	—N/a	—N/a	—N/a
75	Minnesota United FC (Note: No. 75: Orlando City SC → New York City FC → Orlando City SC → Minnesota United FC. January 10, 2019: Minnesota United FC acquired a fourth-round selection in the 2019 SuperDraft, another fourth-round selection in the 2019 SuperDraft (#94 overall), and the #1 spot in the MLS Waiver Order from Orlando City SC in exchange for a second-round selection in the 2020 MLS SuperDraft and the #4 spot in the MLS Waiver Order. Minnesota used its waiver spot to sign midfielder Osvaldo Alonso. On December 12, 2018, Orlando City had re-acquired this fourth-round selection in the 2019 SuperDraft from New York City FC in exchange for midfielder Tony Rocha. On January 27, 2017, New York City FC had acquired this fourth-round selection from Orlando City in exchange for goalkeeper Josh Saunders.)	(United States) Kevin Rodriguez	FW	Northern Illinois	MAC	Brazos Valley Cavalry	(United States) RGVFC Toros (II Division)
76	Colorado Rapids	(United States) Robbie Mertz	MF	Michigan	Big Ten	Burlingame Dragons	(United States) Pittsburgh Riverhounds (II Division)
77	Chicago Fire	(England) Mark Forrest	FW	Lehigh	Patriot	Reading United	(United States) Pittsburgh Riverhounds (II Division)
78	New York Red Bulls (Note: No. 78: Toronto FC → New York Red Bulls. February 14, 2018: New York Red Bulls acquired a fourth-round selection in the 2019 SuperDraft from Toronto FC in exchange for the MLS rights to goalkeeper Caleb Patterson-Sewell.)	(United States) Sean McSherry	MF	Princeton	Ivy	—N/a	(United States) New York Red Bulls II (II Division)
79	Atlanta United FC (Note: No. 79: Minnesota United → Atlanta United. December 10, 2017: Atlanta United FC acquired a fourth-round selection in the 2019 SuperDraft from Minnesota United FC in exchange for midfielder Harrison Heath.)	PASS	—N/a	—N/a	—N/a	—N/a	—N/a
80	Real Salt Lake (Note: No. 80: Houston Dynamo → Real Salt Lake. April 23, 2018: Real Salt Lake acquired a fourth-round selection in the 2019 SuperDraft and future considerations from Houston Dynamo in exchange for the MLS rights to midfielder Luis Gil for the 2018 season.)	PASS	—N/a	—N/a	—N/a	—N/a	—N/a
81	New England Revolution	PASS	—N/a	—N/a	—N/a	—N/a	—N/a
82	Montreal Impact	PASS	—N/a	—N/a	—N/a	—N/a	—N/a
83	Vancouver Whitecaps FC	PASS	—N/a	—N/a	—N/a	—N/a	—N/a
84	New York Red Bulls (Note: No. 84: LA Galaxy → Los Angeles FC → New York Red Bulls. August 3, 2018: New York Red Bulls acquired a fourth-round selection in the 2019 SuperDraft from Los Angeles FC in exchange for the MLS rights to defender Danilo Aparecido da Silva. Trade details needed. As of January 11, 2019, MLS has not reported how or when Los Angeles FC acquired this pick from LA Galaxy. No trade between the LA clubs was announced.)	(United States) Joey Piatczyc	MF	West Virginia	MAC	—N/a	Retired
85	FC Cincinnati (Note: No. 85: Philadelphia Union → FC Cincinnati. January 9, 2019: FC Cincinnati acquired fourth-round (No. 85 overall), first-round (No. 13), second-round (No. 29), second-round (No. 37), and third-round (No. 61) selections in the 2019 MLS SuperDraft from Philadelphia Union in exchange for $150,000 in General Allocation Money. Should additional performance-based metrics be met, FC Cincinnati could send up to an additional $50,000 in General Allocation Money in 2020.)	PASS	—N/a	—N/a	—N/a	—N/a	—N/a
86	LA Galaxy (Note: No. 86: D.C. United → LA Galaxy. December 12, 2016: LA Galaxy acquired a fourth-round selection in the 2019 SuperDraft and midfielder Miguel Aguilar from D.C. United in exchange for a fourth-round selection in the 2018 SuperDraft.)	PASS	—N/a	—N/a	—N/a	—N/a	—N/a
87	FC Dallas	(United States) Sam Ebstein	FW	California	Pac-12	San Francisco Glens	
88	FC Dallas (Note: No. 88: Los Angeles FC → FC Dallas. March 21, 2018: FC Dallas acquired a fourth-round selection in the 2019 SuperDraft and a conditional $50,000 in general allocation money from Los Angeles FC in exchange for the MLS rights to midfielder Shaft Brewer.)	(United States) Dylan Castanheira	GK	Columbia	Ivy	Long Island Rough Riders	(United States) Atlanta United 2 (II Division)
89	Real Salt Lake	PASS	—N/a	—N/a	—N/a	—N/a	—N/a
90	Columbus Crew SC	(Brazil) Rafa Mentzingen	MF	Valparaiso	MVC	Detroit City FC	(United States) Lansing Ignite (III Division)
91	Columbus Crew SC (Note: No. 91: New York City FC → Columbus Crew. December 14, 2017: Columbus Crew SC acquired a fourth-round selection in the 2019 SuperDraft from New York City FC in exchange for goalkeeper Brad Stuver.)	PASS	—N/a	—N/a	—N/a	—N/a	—N/a
92	Montreal Impact (Note: No. 92: Seattle Sounders FC → Montreal Impact. August 10, 2017: Montreal Impact acquired a fourth-round selection in the 2019 SuperDraft from Seattle Sounders FC in exchange for midfielder Calum Mallace.)	PASS	—N/a	—N/a	—N/a	—N/a	—N/a
93	Sporting Kansas City	PASS	—N/a	—N/a	—N/a	—N/a	—N/a
94	Minnesota United FC (Note: No. 94: New York Red Bulls → Orlando City → Minnesota United. January 10, 2019: Minnesota United FC acquired a fourth-round selection in the 2019 SuperDraft, another fourth-round selection in the 2019 SuperDraft (#75 overall), and the #1 spot in the MLS Waiver Order from Orlando City SC in exchange for a second-round selection in the MLS SuperDraft and the #4 spot in the MLS Waiver Order. Minnesota used its waiver spot to sign midfielder Osvaldo Alonso. On December 11, 2018, Orlando City had acquired this fourth-round selection in the 2019 SuperDraft from New York Red Bulls in exchange for defender Amro Tarek.)	(Australia) Mitch Osmond	DF	UTRGV	WAC	Thunder Bay Chill	(United States) Indy Eleven (II Division)
95	Portland Timbers	(Venezuela) David Zalzman	MF	Memphis	American	Memphis City FC	(Venezuela) Deportivo Táchira
96	Orlando City SC (Note: No. 96: Atlanta United → Orlando City. December 11, 2016: Orlando City SC acquired a fourth-round selection in the 2019 SuperDraft from Atlanta United FC in exchange for midfielder Harrison Heath.)	PASS	—N/a	—N/a	—N/a	—N/a	—N/a

== Trades ==
Round 1

Round 2

Round 3

Round 4

== Notable undrafted players ==
=== Homegrown players ===
Original MLS team	Player	Position	College	Conference	Notes	Ref.
Chicago Fire	(United States) Jeremiah Gutjahr	DF	Indiana	Big Ten		
Colorado Rapids	(United States) Matt Hundley	MF	UCLA	Pac-12	All-Pac-12 Second Team	
Colorado Rapids	(United States) Sam Raben	DF	Wake Forest	ACC	All-ACC Third Team	
Columbus Crew	(United States) Aboubacar Keita	DF	Virginia	ACC	All-ACC Rookie Team	
D.C. United	(Bolivia) Antonio Bustamante	MF	William & Mary	CAA		
D.C. United	(United States) Donovan Pines	DF	Maryland	Big Ten		
New England Revolution	(United States) Justin Rennicks	MF	Indiana	Big Ten		
New York Red Bulls	(United States) Omir Fernandez	MF	Wake Forest	ACC	ACC Offensive Player of the Year	
New York Red Bulls	(Ivory Coast) Jean-Christophe Koffi	MF	Virginia	ACC		
Orlando City SC	(United States) Benji Michel	FW	Portland	WCC	All-WCC First Team	
Philadelphia Union	(United States) Matt Freese	GK	Harvard	Ivy		
Real Salt Lake	(United States) Tate Schmitt	FW	Louisville	ACC	All-ACC First Team	
Real Salt Lake	(United States) Erik Holt	FW	UCLA	Pac-12	All-Pac-12 First Team	
Seattle Sounders FC	(United States) Trey Muse	GK	Indiana	Big Ten	Big Ten Goalkeeper of the Year	

=== Players who signed outside of MLS ===
Player	Nat.	Position	College	Conference	Team	League	Notes	Ref.
Zico Bailey	PHI	DF	Cal State Fullerton	Big West	Helsingør	Danish 2nd Division		
Dominic Boland	SCO	DF	Limestone	Conference Carolinas (DII)	Greenville Triumph	USL League One		
Kevin Coiffic	FRA	DF	Young Harris	Peach Belt (DII)	Lansing Ignite	USL League One		
Alex Comsia	CAN	DF	North Carolina Tar Heels	ACC	North Carolina FC	USL Championship	First team 2018 NCAA Men's Soccer All-Americans and ACC Defender of the Year	
Leo Folla	USA	DF	St. Francis Brooklyn	NEC	Chattanooga Red Wolves	USL League One		
Andrew Gutman	USA	DF	Indiana	Big Ten	Celtic	Scottish Premiership	Hermann Trophy winner	
Lewis Jones	BVI	MF	Spring Arbor	Crossroads (NAIA)	Lansing Ignite	USL League One		
Eric Leonard	USA	MF	Butler	Big East	Forward Madison	USL League One		
Eli Lockaby	USA	MF	VCU	Atlantic 10	Richmond Kickers	USL League One		
Nick Moon	USA	MF	Milwaukee	Horizon	Lansing Ignite	USL League One		
Cameron Saul	ENG	MF	Lenoir–Rhyne	SAC (DII)	Greenville Triumph	USL League One		
Travis Ward	USA	FW	Rowan	NJAC (DIII)	Greenville Triumph	USL League One		
Marcel Zajac	CAN	FW	Akron	Mid-American	Forge FC	Canadian Premier League		

== Summary ==
=== Selections by college athletic conference ===
Conference	Round 1	Round 2	Round 3	Round 4	Total
NCAA Division I conferences
ACC	3	2	3	0	8
America East	0	0	2	0	2
American	1	1	0	1	3
Atlantic 10	2	1	1	0	4
Atlantic Sun	1	0	0	1	2
Big East	2	2	0	0	4
Big South	0	0	0	0	0
Big Ten	5	5	1	1	12
Big West	1	0	0	0	1
CAA	0	1	0	0	1
Conference USA	3	1	0	0	4
Horizon	0	0	0	0	0
Ivy	1	0	2	2	5
MAAC	0	0	1	0	1
Mid-American	0	2	2	1	5
Missouri Valley	0	0	1	1	2
Northeast	0	0	0	0	0
Pac-12	3	4	2	1	10
Patriot	0	0	0	1	1
SoCon	0	0	0	0	0
Summit	1	0	0	1	1
Sun Belt	0	0	0	0	0
WAC	1	1	1	1	4
West Coast	0	1	0	0	1
NCAA Division II conferences
GNAC	0	1	0	0	1
Non-NCAA conferences
NPL	0	1	0	0	1
Passes
Pass	0	0	8	13	21

=== Schools with multiple draft selections ===
Selections	Schools
4	Maryland
3	California, Indiana, Michigan State
2	Akron, Charlotte, Creighton, Dartmouth, Denver, Fordham, Michigan, Oregon State, Seattle, UCLA, Wake Forest
