= Nathan Lewis =

Nathan Lewis is the name of:

- Nathan Lewis (chemist), American chemist
- Nathan Lewis (footballer), Trinidadian footballer
- Nate Lewis, American football player for the Chicago Bears
