= Archer Stadium =

Stadium in Clinton County, Michigan, USA

- The Arch
- Interactive map of Archer Stadium
- Location: East Lansing Soccer Complex; 3700 Coleman Road; East Lansing, MI 48823
- Coordinates: 42.771806°N 84.486906°W,
- Owner: City of East Lansing
- Capacity: 1,500

Tenants
- East Lansing Trojans; Lansing United (PDL) (2014–2018); Lansing United Women (UWS) (2018–present)

Website
- East Lansing Soccer Complex

Archer Stadium is a 1,500 seat soccer stadium located in East Lansing, Michigan. Its primary tenants are East Lansing High School and Lansing United Women of United Women's Soccer.

== History ==
In 2013, the two varsity fields at the East Lansing Soccer Complex were renamed "Archer Stadium" to honor over 40 years of service from East Lansing High School coach Nick Archer. Archer was a member of the Michigan State Spartans men's soccer team during their 1967 and 1968 National Titles, and later founded both the boys and girls soccer programs at East Lansing High School

== Notable matches ==
Archer Stadium hosted the 2014 NPSL Midwest Region Playoffs. The host club, Lansing United, secured the Regional crown by beating the Fort Pitt Regiment 2–1 in the final.

On July 9, 2017, a facility record, 1,388 people watched Lansing United take on Detroit City FC.
