= Ivo Cerda =

Chilean footballer (born 1995)

Personal information
- Full name: Ivo Héctor Cerda Woldarsky
- Date of birth: 31 October 1995 (age 31)
- Place of birth: Santiago, Chile
- Height: 1.77 m (5 ft 10 in)
- Position: Midfielder

Youth career
- 2007–2014: Universidad Católica

College career
Years	Team	Apps	(Gls)
2015–2018	Michigan Wolverines	66	(9)

Senior career*
Years	Team	Apps	(Gls)
2016	Chicago FC United	7	(1)
2017–2018	Michigan Bucks	7	(2)
2019	Lansing Ignite	27	(0)
- * Club domestic league appearances and goals as of 14 October 2019

Ivo Héctor Cerda Woldarsky (born 31 October 1995), known as Ivo Cerda, is a Chilean footballer.

== Career ==
Cerda began his soccer career in the academy system of Chilean professional club Universidad Católica, where he played from 2007 to 2014. During that time he represented Chile at the 2008 Latin American Volkswagen Youth Cup in Argentina and the 2011 International School Sports Federation World Championship in Brazil. He made his professional debut for Universidad Católica in a friendly game against Deportes Iquique on July 10th, 2013.

Cerda played collegiate soccer at the University of Michigan from 2015 to 2018 and served as team captain during the 2017 and 2018 seasons. He was named to the Big Ten All-Tournament Team in 2017. That same year, Michigan won its first Big Ten Regular Season Championship.

Cerda played professional soccer as a midfielder for Lansing Ignite FC of USL League One in 2019. He led the league in interceptions and tackle success ratio.

== Personal ==
In 2016, Cerda was named the University of Michigan Rookie Student-Athlete of the Year. He went on to earn multiple academic honors, including three-time Academic All-Big Ten (2016 - 18), two-time Big Ten Distinguished Scholar (2016, 17), three-time First Team Academic All-District (2016 - 2018), and three-time U-M Academic Achievement Award (2016 - 18). He received the Bates Deskins Award in 2018, recognizing the top junior student-athlete in the athletic department and was a finalist for the 2018 National Senior CLASS Award.

Cerda was selected as a First-Team Academic All-American by College Sports Communicators in both 2017 and 2018, a first in program history.

In May 2021, Cerda was named the sole male recipient of the NCAA's Walter Byers Graduate Scholarship, the organization's highest academic honor. Cerda enrolled at Harvard Medical School in the Fall of 2021.
