= Lansing Ignite FC =

American professional soccer club in Michigan (2018–2019)

- Full name: Lansing Ignite Football Club
- Founded: October 25, 2018; 8 years ago
- Dissolved: October 21, 2019; 7 years ago
- Stadium: Cooley Law School Stadium
- Capacity: 7,527
- Owner: Tom Dickson
- President: Nick Grueser
- General Manager: Jeremy Sampson
- Coach: Nate Miller
- League: USL League One
Home colors	Away colors

Lansing Ignite FC was a professional soccer team based in Lansing, Michigan, United States. The club began play in the newly-formed USL League One in 2019 and ceased operations following their inaugural season.

== History ==
The formation of USL League One (originally announced as USL Division III) was first announced in April 2017, and league officials began touring the country looking for candidate cities for new soccer clubs. The city of Lansing was already home to Lansing United, an amateur soccer team in the National Premier Soccer League. In 2018, United moved from NPSL to the Premier Development League, another amateur league often considered the fourth tier of American soccer. The move was seen as a step towards establishing a professional team, as the PDL is managed by United Soccer Leagues, the same organization that manages League One as well as the second-tier United Soccer League.

In September 2018, the Lansing State Journal reported that the owners of the Lansing Lugnuts, a local minor league baseball team, had presented plans to Lansing City Council for a professional soccer team to play at Cooley Law School Stadium, also home to the Lugnuts. On October 8, the city council unanimously approved the plans, which are expected to cost the city $1 million over the course of a five-year contract. This also signaled the end of the Lansing United men's team, as United owner Jeremy Sampson became the new club's general manager; however, Lansing United Women would continue to operate as planned.

On October 25, 2018, USL League One officially announced Lansing Ignite FC as its ninth founding member team, to begin play in 2019. On November 14, 2018, Lansing Ignite FC announced Nate Miller as the inaugural head coach. On March 19, 2019, Lansing Ignite FC announced an affiliation agreement with Chicago Fire of Major League Soccer.

Lansing played their first USL League One match on 30 March 2019, beating Richmond Kickers 3–2 at City Stadium, Richmond. Lansing finished their first season with a 12–6–10 record, good for second place in USL League One. They fell in the playoff semifinal to Greenville Triumph SC, 1–0. On October 14, 2019, midfielder Marshall Hollingsworth posted on Instagram that the Ignite would be folding and that all players had been released from their contracts. Team President Nick Grueser said that the team would not give an update on the team's future until after the conclusion of the League One final.

On October 21, 2019, it was officially announced by USL League One that, despite a successful first season performance-wise, the Ignite would not be returning for the 2020 season.

In 2020, Lansing Common FC, was formed as a supporter-owned team. They began play in 2021 as part of the Midwest Premier League.

== Sponsorship ==
Season	Kit manufacturer	Shirt sponsor
2019	Moneyball	LAFCU

== Players ==
=== First team roster ===
As of match played March 30, 2019

No.	Name	Nationality	Position(s)	Date of birth (age)	Signed in	Previous club
Goalkeepers
1	Mike Kirk	(United States)	GK	February 12, 1994 (age 32)	2019	(United States) Pittsburgh Riverhounds
13	Kyle Ihn	(United States)	GK	December 10, 1994 (age 31)	2019	(United States) Reno 1868
Defenders
2	Rhys Williams	(United States)	DF	August 9, 1995 (age 31)	2019	(United States) Real Monarchs
4	Grant Stoneman	(United States)	DF	November 27, 1995 (age 30)	2019	(United States) Loyola Ramblers
5	Brandon Fricke	(United States)	DF	March 27, 1992 (age 34)	2019	(United States) Des Moines Menace
17	Kevin Coiffic	(France)	DF	September 18, 1994 (age 32)	2019	(United States) Young Harris Mountain Lions
25	Marshall Hollingsworth	(United States)	DF	August 6, 1993 (age 33)	2019	(United States) Columbus Crew
Midfielders
6	Ricardo Perez	(Mexico)	MF	May 30, 1995 (age 31)	2019	(United States) Colorado Rapids
7	Rafael Mentzingen	(Brazil)	MF	May 2, 1996 (age 30)	2019	(United States) Valparaiso Crusaders
8	Kyle Carr	(United States)	MF	January 21, 1995 (age 31)	2019	(United States) Lansing United
10	Xavier Gomez	(United States)	MF	November 21, 1994 (age 31)	2019	(United States) Chicago FC United
12	Christian Silva	(United States)	MF	August 2, 1989 (age 37)	2019	(United States) Jacksonville Armada
16	Lewis Jones	(British Virgin Islands)	MF	December 25, 1994 (age 31)	2019	(United States) Lansing United
21	Ivo Cerda	(Chile)	MF	October 31, 1995 (age 31)	2019	(United States) Michigan Wolverines
23	Tumi Moshobane	(South Africa)	MF	September 7, 1994 (age 32)	2019	(United States) Lansing United
24	Elma N'For	(Cameroon)	MF		2019	(United States) Asheville City
27	Nathan Lewis	(Trinidad and Tobago)	MF	July 20, 1990 (age 36)	2019	(United States) Indy Eleven
—	Omar Castro	(United States)	MF	February 7, 1996 (age 30)	2019	(Germany) TSC Vahdet
Forwards
9	Ricky Lopez-Espin	(United States)	FW	December 2, 1995 (age 30)	2019	(United States) Real Salt Lake
11	Steeve Saint-Duc	(Haiti)	FW	January 8, 2000 (age 26)	2019	(United States) Los Angeles FC
14	Nick Moon	(United States)	FW	May 31, 1996 (age 30)	2019	(United States) Lane United
19	Pato Botello Faz	(Mexico)	FW	September 8, 1996 (age 30)	2019	(United States) St. Mary's Rattlers
20	Alex Bruce	(England)	FW	October 28, 1998 (age 28)	2019	(United States) San Antonio FC (loan)

== Coaching staff ==
Position	Name
Head coach	(United States) Nate Miller
Assistant coach	(United States) Tim Daniels
Assistant coach	(United States) Joel DeLass
Goalkeeping coach	(Egypt) Wael Zenga

== 2019 season ==
Lansing Ignite
2019 season
- Owner: Tom Dickson
- Head coach: Nate Miller
- Stadium: Cooley Law School Stadium
- USL League One: 2nd
- USL1 Playoffs: Semifinals
- U.S. Open Cup: 2nd Round
- Top goalscorer: Tumi Moshobane (10)
- Highest home attendance: League/All: 4,818 (June 22 vs. Orlando City B)
- Lowest home attendance: League: 1,725 (May 11 vs. Greenville Triumph); All: 100 (May 8 vs. AFC Ann Arbor (USOC))
- Average home league attendance: 2,758
- Biggest win: 5–0 (September 6 at FC Tucson)
- Biggest defeat: 0–3 (June 8 at Toronto FC II)

=== Preseason friendlies ===
February 27	Indy Eleven	1–2	Lansing Ignite	Westfield, Indiana
2:00 PM EST	Ilić 68'	Report	Saint-Duc 21' (pen.); Mentzingen 78'	Stadium: Grand Park Indoor Arena; Attendance: 300

March 3	Pittsburgh Riverhounds	2–0	Lansing Ignite	Pittsburgh, Pennsylvania
12:00 PM EST	Dos Santos 22'; Bartman 66'	Report		Stadium: Highmark Stadium; Attendance: Closed door

March 8	Lansing Ignite	7–0	Davenport Panthers	Brighton, Michigan
1:00 PM EST	Botello 6', 22'; Williams 30'; Moon 37'; Saint-Duc 41'; N'For 58'; Coiffic 75'	Report		Stadium: Legacy Center; Attendance: 200

March 15	Lansing Ignite	3–0	Western Michigan Broncos	Brighton, Michigan
1:00 PM EST	Saint-Duc 64', 77'; N'For 75'	Report		Stadium: Legacy Center; Attendance: 418

=== Midseason friendlies ===
April 16 Capital Cup	Lansing Ignite	4–0	Michigan State Spartans	Lansing, Michigan
7:00 PM EST	Botello Faz 28'; Saint-Duc 50'; N'For 62'; Bruce 88'	Report	Stanley (yellow card) 54'; Pimlott (yellow card) 66'	Stadium: Cooley Law School Stadium; Attendance: 3,338

September 24	Lansing Ignite	v	Chicago Fire SC Reserves	Lansing, Michigan
7:00 PM EDT				Stadium: Cooley Law School Stadium

September 28	Lansing Ignite	v	Livonia City FC	Lansing, Michigan
7:00 PM EDT				Stadium: Cooley Law School Stadium
Note: Originally scheduled to play Grand Rapids FC. Change announced on September 4.

=== USL League One ===
==== Standings ====
Pos	Team	Pld	W	D	L	GF	GA	GD	Pts	Qualification
1	North Texas SC	28	17	5	6	53	31	+22	56	Playoffs
2	Lansing Ignite FC	28	12	10	6	49	37	+12	46	Playoffs
3	Greenville Triumph SC	28	12	7	9	32	22	+10	43	Playoffs
4	Forward Madison FC	28	12	7	9	33	26	+7	43	Playoffs
5	Chattanooga Red Wolves SC	28	10	10	8	35	37	−2	40	

Source: 2019 USL League One standings
Rules for classification: 1) total wins; 2) total goal differential; 3) total goals scored; 4) points earned against top four Conference finishers; 5) disciplinary points; 6) coin toss or drawing of lots

==== Results summary ====
Overall								Home						Away					
Pld	W	D	L	GF	GA	GD	Pts	W	D	L	GF	GA	GD	W	D	L	GF	GA	GD
28	12	10	6	49	37	+12	46	8	4	2	28	16	+12	4	6	4	21	21	0

Source: USL

==== Results by round ====
Round	1	2	3	4	5	6	7	8	9	10	11	12	13	14	15	16	17	18	19	20	21	22	23	24	25	26	27	28
Stadium	A	A	H	H	A	A	H	H	A	A	A	A	H	H	A	A	H	H	A	A	H	H	A	H	A	H	H	H
Result	W	L	W	L	L	D	D	D	D	W	L	D	W	W	L	D	W	D	D	D	W	W	W	W	W	W	D	L
Position	4	5	4	4	9	8	9	7	8	4	7	7	5	4	6	6	4	5	6	6	5	3	2	2	2	2	2	2

Source: USL
A = Away; H = Home; W = Win; D = Draw; L = Loss

==== Results ====
March 30 1	Richmond Kickers	2–3	Lansing Ignite	Richmond, Virginia
5:00 PM EDT	Gallardo (yellow card) 25', (goal) 76' (pen.); Rodriguez 68'; Eckenrode (yellow card) 72'	Report	Moshobane 19'; Gomez 27'; Coiffic (yellow card) 32', (goal) 49'; Carr (yellow card) 63'; Stoneman (yellow card) 75'; Cerda (yellow card) 86'	Stadium: City Stadium; Attendance: 5,936; Referee: Danielle Chesky

April 6 2	Greenville Triumph SC	2–1	Lansing Ignite FC	Greenville, South Carolina
7:00 PM EDT	Robinson (yellow card) 7'; Seiler (yellow card) 35' (yellow-red card) 77'; Politz 85'; Clowes (yellow card) 89'	Report	Perez (yellow card) 14' (yellow-red card) 58'; Lopez-Espin 27'; Stoneman (yellow card) 40'; Coiffic (yellow card) 32', (goal) 49'; Moshobane (yellow card) 59' (yellow-red card) 62'	Stadium: Legacy Early College Field; Attendance: 4,014; Referee: Jasmine Peralta

April 13 3	Lansing Ignite	3–1	Richmond Kickers	Lansing, Michigan
5:00 PM EDT		Report		Stadium: Cooley Law School Stadium; Attendance: 3,369; Referee: Danielle Chesky

April 26 4	Lansing Ignite	0–2	Toronto FC II	Lansing, Michigan
7:00 PM EDT	Stoneman (yellow card) 45+1'; Moshobane (yellow card) 80'	Report	Petrasso 11'; Mohammed (yellow card) 24'; Campbell (yellow card) 39'; Okello (yellow card) 53'; Ovalle 85' (pen.)	Stadium: Cooley Law School Stadium; Attendance: 1,895; Referee: Nickrod Fateh

April 30 5	FC Tucson	2–0	Lansing Ignite	Tucson, Arizona
9:00 PM	Jambga 27'; Somersall (yellow card) 38'; Spencer (yellow card) 49'; Vega (yellow card) 57' (goal) 62'	Report	Fricke (yellow card) 49'	Stadium: Kino North Stadium; Attendance: 702; Referee: Karen Abt

May 4 6	Richmond Kickers	2–2	Lansing Ignite	Richmond, Virginia
7:00 PM EDT	Chin 32'; Shanosky (yellow card) 75'; Jackson 90'	Report	Cerda (yellow card) 24'; Stoneman (yellow card) 27'; Lopez-Espin 58'; Fricke 70'	Stadium: City Stadium; Attendance: 2,947; Referee: Matt Franz

May 11 7	Lansing Ignite	1–1	Greenville Triumph SC	Lansing, Michigan
7:00 PM EDT	Lopez-Espin 76'	Report	Boland (yellow card) 36'; Polak (yellow card) 58'; Ward 68'	Stadium: Cooley Law School Stadium; Attendance: 1,725; Referee: Adam Kilpatrick

May 18 8	Lansing Ignite	2–2	North Texas SC	Lansing, Michigan
7:00 PM EDT	Mentzigen 54', (yellow card) 56'; Bruce 65', (red card) 90+5'; Saint-Duc (yellow card) 72'; Stoneman (yellow card) 89'	Report	Tessmann (yellow card) 35'; Jatta (yellow card) 51'; Pepi 83'; A. Rodríguez 87', (yellow card) 90+2'; Almaguer (yellow card) 89'	Stadium: Cooley Law School Stadium; Attendance: 2,149; Referee: Calin Radosav

May 25 9	Tormenta FC	0–0	Lansing Ignite	Statesboro, Georgia
7:00 PM EDT	Miccaletto (yellow card) 42'; Knutson (yellow card) 59'	Report	Cleveland (yellow card) 73'	Stadium: Eagle Field; Attendance: 1,697; Referee: Joshua Encarnacion

June 1 10	Forward Madison FC	0–1	Lansing Ignite	Madison, Wisconsin
8:00 PM EDT	Banks (yellow card) 39'; Núñez (red card) 90+7'	Report	Moon 47'; Stoneman (yellow card) 51'; Cerda (yellow card) 80'	Stadium: Breese Stevens Field; Attendance: 4,271; Referee: Brad Jensen

June 8 11	Toronto FC II	3–0	Lansing Ignite	Toronto, Ontario
4:00 PM EDT	Hundal 29'; Ovalle (yellow card) 48'; Dorsey (yellow card) 66'; Bunk-Andersen 80'; Perruzza 90+1'	Report		Stadium: BMO Training Ground; Referee: Myriam Marcotte

June 15 12	Greenville Triumph SC	1–1	Lansing Ignite	Greenville, South Carolina
7:00 PM EDT	Seiler 66'	Report	Moon 30'; Saint-Duc (yellow card) 90+3'	Stadium: Legacy Early College Field; Attendance: 2,715; Referee: Matthew Corrigan

June 19 13	Lansing Ignite	1–0	Toronto FC II	Lansing, Michigan
7:00 PM EDT	Saint-Duc (yellow card) 28', (goal) 61'; Bruce (yellow card) 87'	Report	Mingo (yellow card) 27'; Srbely (yellow card) 89'	Stadium: Cooley Law School Stadium; Attendance: 2,287; Referee: Becky Pagan

June 22 14	Lansing Ignite	2–0	Orlando City B	Lansing, Michigan
7:00 PM EDT	Moshobane (yellow card) 28'; Moon 51'; Bruce (yellow card) 59'; Coiffic 68'	Report	Bagrou (yellow card) 30'	Stadium: Cooley Law School Stadium; Attendance: 4,818; Referee: Chris Ruska

June 29 15	North Texas SC	3–1	Lansing Ignite	Frisco, Texas
7:00 PM EDT	Tessmann (yellow card) 43'; Montgomery 57'; Damus (yellow card) 59', (goal) 73'; Rodriguez 71'	Report	Moon (yellow card) 59'; Cleveland (yellow card) 74'; Faz 83'	Stadium: Toyota Stadium; Attendance: 632; Referee: Marco Vega

July 6 16	Chattanooga Red Wolves	1–1	Lansing Ignite	Chattanooga, Tennessee
7:00 PM EDT	Cisse (red card) 12'; Walls 55'	Report	N'For 25'; Fricke (yellow card) 30'; Coiffic (red card) 45'; Moon (yellow card) 57'	Stadium: David Stanton Field; Attendance: 1,766; Referee: Michael Smith

July 9 17	Lansing Ignite	3–2	Forward Madison FC	Lansing, Michigan
7:00 PM EDT	N'For 17'; Mentzigen 90+2', (yellow card) 90+3'; Bruce 90+5'	Report	Smart 32', (yellow card) 50'; Bennett (yellow card) 63'; Banks 90+4'	Stadium: Cooley Law School Stadium; Attendance: 1,871; Referee: Kevin Fikar

July 13 18	Lansing Ignite	2–2	FC Tucson	Lansing, Michigan
7:00 PM EDT	Moshobane 26' (pen.), 49'; Williams (yellow card) 50'	Report	Howell 34'; Jones 52' (pen.); Hauswirth (yellow card) 73'	Stadium: Cooley Law School Stadium; Attendance: 4,348; Referee: Gabriele Giusti

July 19 19	Toronto FC II	3–3	Lansing Ignite	Toronto, Ontario
4:00 PM EDT	Perruzza 35'; Dorsey (yellow card) 38'; Bunk-Andersen 78'; Romeo 81', (yellow card) 84'	Report	Faz 41' (pen.); Fricke 51'; Gomez 54'	Stadium: BMO Training Ground; Referee: Giancarlo Pavone

July 27 20	Tormenta FC	1–1	Lansing Ignite	Statesboro, Georgia
8:00 PM EDT	Knutson (yellow card) 16'; Saint-Vil (yellow card) 21'; Kadono 88'; Micaletto (yellow card) 90'; Morrell (yellow card) 90+3'	Report	Mentzingen 12', (yellow card) 45+3'; Coiffic (yellow card) 35'; Stoneman (yellow card) 60'; Carr (yellow card) 90+3'	Stadium: Eagle Field; Attendance: 1,785; Referee: Nickrod Fateh

July 31 21	Lansing Ignite	2–0	Chattanooga Red Wolves	Lansing, Michigan
7:00 PM EDT	Moshobane 32'; Mentzigen (yellow card) 50'; Faz 84'	Report	Kendall-Moullin (yellow card) 10'; Pineda (yellow card) 45+1'	Stadium: Cooley Law School Stadium; Attendance: 2,215; Referee: José Lara

August 3 22	Lansing Ignite	3–0	Orlando City B	Lansing, Michigan
7:00 PM EDT	Moshobane 8'; N'For 14'; Mentzingen 84'	Report	Tablante (yellow card) 37'; Thiago (yellow card) 50'; Amer (yellow card) 87'	Stadium: Cooley Law School Stadium; Attendance: 3,285; Referee: Carter Brochu

August 16 23	Orlando City B	1–2	Lansing Ignite	Montverde, Florida
7:30 PM EDT	Forbes (yellow card) 13'; Tablante (yellow card) 42'; Bagrou 71'	Report	Gomez 22', (yellow card) 82'; Coiffic (yellow card) 28'; Mentzingen 54'	Stadium: Montverde Academy; Referee: Joshua Encarnación

August 22 24	Lansing Ignite	4–1	North Texas SC	Lansing, Michigan
7:00 PM EDT	Faz 8', 69'; Moon (yellow card) 31'; N'For 50'; Moshobane 71'	Report	Rayo (yellow card) 65'; Rodriguez (yellow card) 76'; Romero 86' (pen.)	Stadium: Cooley Law School Stadium; Attendance: 2,757; Referee: Luis Arroyo

September 6 25	FC Tucson	0–5	Lansing Ignite	Tucson, Arizona
10:30 PM EDT	Wheeler-Omiunu (yellow card) 28'; Venter (yellow card) 62'; Batista (yellow card) 76'	Report	Moon (yellow card) 12'; Faz 16', 26'; Moshobane 33', 90+3'; Williams 60'	Stadium: Kino North Stadium; Attendance: 708; Referee: Omeed Azadpour

September 14 26	Lansing Ignite	4–3	Chattanooga Red Wolves	Lansing, Michigan
7:00 PM EDT	Mentzingen 8'; Moshobane 18', 90'; Moon 30', (yellow card) 79'; Gomez (yellow card) 60'; Carr (yellow card) 77'	Report	Zguro 3', (red card) 60'; Hurst 17', 54'; Amponsah (yellow card) 35'; Beattie (yellow card) 43'	Stadium: Cooley Law School Stadium; Attendance: 2,994; Referee: Calin Radosav

September 21 27	Lansing Ignite	1–1	Tormenta FC	Lansing, Michigan
7:00 PM EDT	Moon 45+1'	Report	Dennis (yellow card) 19'; Arslan (yellow card) 34'; Rowe 67'	Stadium: Cooley Law School Stadium; Attendance: 2,489; Referee: Joshua Encarnación

October 5 28	Lansing Ignite	0–1	Forward Madison FC	Lansing, Michigan
7:00 PM EDT	N'For (yellow card) 20'; Fricke (yellow card) 59'; Moshobane (yellow card) 73'; Williams (yellow card) 87'	Report	Omsberg (yellow card) 31'; Banks 43'; Núñez (yellow card) 66'; Paulo Jr. (yellow card) 68'; Díaz (yellow card) 81'; Leonard (yellow card) 90+4'	Stadium: Cooley Law School Stadium; Attendance: 2,412; Referee: José Lara

==== USL League One Playoffs ====
October 12 Semifinals	Lansing Ignite FC	0–1	Greenville Triumph SC	Lansing, Michigan
7:00 p.m. (EDT)	Coiffic (yellow card) 70'; Cerda (yellow card) 74'; Cleveland (yellow card) 87'	Report	Clowes (yellow card) 37'; Mohamed (yellow card) 45+2'; Polak (yellow card) 46'; Bermudez 59'; Gómez (yellow card) 79'	Stadium: Cooley Law School Stadium; Attendance: 2,340; Referee: Matthew Thompson

=== U.S. Open Cup ===
May 8 1st Round	Lansing Ignite FC (Michigan)	2–1	(Michigan) AFC Ann Arbor	Lansing, Michigan
7:00 pm EDT	N'For 29', 72'	Report	Alexis (yellow card) 40', (goal) 66'	Stadium: Lansing Catholic High School; Attendance: 100; Referee: Nicole Green
Note: Kickoff time and venue changed from 7:00 p.m. at Cooley Law School Stadium due to inclement field conditions.

May 15 2nd Round	Indy Eleven (Indiana)	1–0	(Michigan) Lansing Ignite FC	Indianapolis, Indiana
7:00 PM EDT	Newton (red card) 21'; Enevoldsen (yellow card) 51', (goal) 57'; Watson (yellow card) 62'; Walker (yellow card) 88'; Kelly (yellow card) 90+2'	Report	Stoneman (yellow card) 62'	Stadium: Bud and Jackie Sellick Bowl; Attendance: 853; Referee: Adam Behrens

== Final roster ==
=== Final team roster ===
As of January 10, 2019.

No.	Position	Nation	Player
1	GK	USA	Mike Kirk
2	DF	USA	Rhys Williams
4	DF	USA	Grant Stoneman
5	DF	USA	Brandon Fricke
6	MF	MEX	Ricardo Pérez
7	MF	BRA	Rafael Mentzingen
8	MF	USA	Kyle Carr
10	MF	USA	Xavier Gomez
11	FW	HAI	Steeve Saint-Duc
12	MF	USA	Christian Silva
13	GK	USA	Kyle Ihn
14	DF	USA	Nick Moon
16	MF	VGB	Lewis Jones
17	DF	FRA	Kevin Coiffic
19	FW	MEX	Pato Botello Faz
21	MF	CHI	Ivo Cerda
23	MF	RSA	Tumi Moshobane
24	FW	CMR	Elma N'For
25	DF	USA	Marshall Hollingsworth
27	MF	TTO	Nathan Lewis

== Year-by-year ==
Lansing Ignite FC
Season	USL League One								Play-offs	U.S. Open Cup	Top Scorer ^{1}		Head coach
Season	P	W	L	D	GF	GA	Pts	Pos	Play-offs	U.S. Open Cup	Player	Goals	Head coach
2019	28	12	6	10	49	37	46	2nd	National Semifinals	2R	(South Africa) Tumi Moshobane	10	(Israel) Nate Miller

1. Top Scorer includes statistics from league matches only.

=== Head coaches ===
- Includes USL Regular Season, USL Playoffs, U.S. Open Cup. Excludes friendlies.

Coach	Nationality	Start	End	Games	Win	Loss	Draw	Win %
Nate Miller	Israel	November 14, 2018	Present	31	13	8	10	41.94

=== Average attendance ===
Year	Reg. season	Playoffs
2019	2,758	2,340
