= Alex Bruce (footballer, born 1998) =

English footballer

Personal information
- Full name: Alexander Bruce
- Date of birth: 28 October 1998 (age 28)
- Place of birth: Gateshead, England
- Height: 1.85 m (6 ft 1 in)
- Position: Forward

Youth career
- 2016–2017: Texans SC Houston

Senior career*
Years	Team	Apps	(Gls)
2018–2019	San Antonio FC	13	(3)
2019	→ Lansing Ignite (loan)	23	(3)
2020–2021	North Texas SC	32	(4)
2022	Union Omaha	16	(1)
2023	Hồ Chí Minh City	1	(0)
- * Club domestic league appearances and goals as of 16 October 2022

Alex Bruce (born 28 October 1998) is an English footballer who plays as a forward.

== Career ==
Bruce played with youth side Texans SC Houston during their 2016–17 season, where he scored 17 goals in 29 appearances. On 10 January 2018, Bruce signed for the United Soccer League side San Antonio FC.

On 6 December 2019, Bruce joined North Texas SC.
