= Kevin Mendoza =

Mexican footballer (born 1994)

Personal information
- Full name: Kevin Yharim Varela Mendoza
- Date of birth: January 8, 1994 (age 32)
- Place of birth: Mexico City, Mexico
- Height: 1.74 m (5 ft 9 in)
- Position: Attacking midfielder

Youth career
- –2015: Cruz Azul

College career
Years	Team	Apps	(Gls)
2015–2018	Liberty Flames	62	(30)

Senior career*
Years	Team	Apps	(Gls)
2017	Tampa Bay Rowdies U23	11	(8)
2018	OKC Energy U23	6	(1)
2019	Veracruz	0	(0)
2020	Tampa Bay Rowdies	6	(0)
- * Club domestic league appearances and goals as of 6 October 2020

Kevin Yharim Varela Mendoza (born 8 January 1994) is a Mexican footballer.

== Career ==
=== Youth, College & Amateur ===
Mendoza played with the U-17 and U-20 sides at Cruz Azul, before moving to the United States to play college soccer at Liberty University in Lynchburg, Virginia. Across four seasons with the Flames, Mendoza made 62 appearances, scoring 30 goals and tallying 15 assists. In 2016 and 2017 Mendoza was named Big South All-Conference first team, and in 2018 was the first Liberty Flame player to be named to the Atlantic All-Region team since 2012.

Whilst at college, Mendoza appeared for USL PDL clubs Tampa Bay Rowdies U23 and OKC Energy U23.

=== Professional ===
On 14 January 2019, Mendoza was selected 73rd overall in the 2019 MLS SuperDraft by Los Angeles FC. However, he did not sign with the club.

In July 2019, Mendoza joined Liga MX side Veracruz.

On 19 December 2019, Mendoza moved to USL Championship side Tampa Bay Rowdies ahead of their 2020 season. He made his professional debut on 25 July 2020, appearing as an 87th-minute substitute during a 1–1 draw with Birmingham Legion.
