= 2018 Atlantic Coast Conference men's soccer season =

- League: NCAA Division I
- Sport: Soccer
- Duration: August 24, 2018 – October 27, 2018
- Teams: 12

2019 MLS SuperDraft
- Top draft pick: Tajon Buchanan – Syracuse
- Picked by: New England Revolution, 9th overall

Regular season
- Season champions: Atlantic:Wake Forest; Coastal:North Carolina
- Runners-up: Atlantic:Louisville; Coastal:Duke
- Season MVP: Offensive: Omir Fernandez; Midfielder: Bruno Lapa; Defensive: Alex Comsia
- Top scorer: Edward Kizza - Pittsburgh

ACC tournament
- Champions: Louisville
- Runners-up: North Carolina
- Finals MVP: (United States) Tate Schmitt

ACC men's soccer seasons
- ← 2017 2019 →

2018 ACC men's soccer standings
| | Conf. | | | | | Overall |
| Team | W | | L | | T | W | | L | | T |
|---|---|---|---|---|---|---|---|---|---|---|
Atlantic
| No. 6 Wake Forest + | 7 | – | 1 | – | 0 | 18 | – | 3 | – | 0 |
| No. 16 Louisville ‡ | 4 | – | 2 | – | 2 | 11 | – | 5 | – | 3 |
| NC State + | 2 | – | 4 | – | 2 | 10 | – | 7 | – | 3 |
| Boston College | 2 | – | 5 | – | 1 | 4 | – | 8 | – | 4 |
| Syracuse + | 1 | – | 4 | – | 3 | 7 | – | 7 | – | 4 |
| Clemson | 2 | – | 6 | – | 0 | 7 | – | 9 | – | 1 |
Coastal
| No. 14 North Carolina + | 6 | – | 1 | – | 0 | 14 | – | 4 | – | 1 |
| No. 11 Duke + | 5 | – | 3 | – | 0 | 11 | – | 7 | – | 2 |
| No. 8 Notre Dame + | 4 | – | 3 | – | 1 | 11 | – | 7 | – | 3 |
| No. 15 Virginia + | 3 | – | 2 | – | 2 | 10 | – | 4 | – | 3 |
| No. 17 Virginia Tech + | 3 | – | 4 | – | 1 | 11 | – | 7 | – | 3 |
| Pittsburgh | 2 | – | 6 | – | 0 | 8 | – | 10 | – | 1 |
‡ – 2018 ACC Tournament champion + – Invited to the 2018 NCAA Division I Men's Soccer Championship; As of December 11, 2018; Rankings from United Soccer Coaches; Source:The ACC

The 2018 Atlantic Coast Conference men's soccer season was the 65th season of men's varsity soccer in the conference.

The Wake Forest Demon Deacons are the defending champions of the Atlantic Conference and the North Carolina are the defending champions of the Coastal Conference. Wake Forest are the defending ACC tournament champions. Both Wake Forest and North Carolina successfully defended their titles, while Louisville won the ACC tournament.

== Changes from 2017 ==
After the 2017 season, Bobby Clark retired as the Notre Dame head coach. He was replaced by Chad Riley, who was hired from Dartmouth.

After the 2018 season, Louisville Cardinals coach Ken Lolla resigned after 13 years and a 155–77–39 record with the team. He was replaced by John Michael Hayden on December 27, 2018

== Teams ==
=== Stadiums and locations ===
Atlantic Division
| Team | Stadium | Capacity |
|---|---|---|
| Boston College Eagles | Newton Soccer Complex | 2,500 |
| Clemson Tigers | Riggs Field | 6,500 |
| Louisville Cardinals | Lynn Stadium | 5,300 |
| NC State Wolfpack | Dail Soccer Field | 3,000 |
| Syracuse Orange | SU Soccer Stadium | 5,000 |
| Wake Forest Demon Deacons | Spry Stadium | 3,000 |

Coastal Division
| Team | Stadium | Capacity |
|---|---|---|
| Duke Blue Devils | Koskinen Stadium | 7,000 |
| North Carolina Tar Heels | Fetzer Field | 5,025 |
| Notre Dame Fighting Irish | Alumni Stadium | 2,500 |
| Pittsburgh Panthers | Ambrose Urbanic Field | 735 |
| Virginia Cavaliers | Klöckner Stadium | 8,000 |
| Virginia Tech Hokies | Thompson Field | 2,500 |

1. Florida State, Georgia Tech and Miami do not sponsor men's soccer

=== Personnel ===
| Team | Head coach | Captain |
|---|---|---|
| Boston College Eagles | (Republic of Ireland) Ed Kelly | |
| Clemson Tigers | (United States) Mike Noonan | |
| Duke Blue Devils | (United States) John Kerr Jr. | |
| Louisville Cardinals | (United States) Ken Lolla | |
| NC State Wolfpack | (United States) George Kiefer | |
| North Carolina Tar Heels | (Guatemala) Carlos Somoano | |
| Notre Dame Fighting Irish | (United States) Chad Riley | |
| Pittsburgh Panthers | (United States) Jay Vidovich | |
| Syracuse Orange | (England) Ian McIntyre | |
| Virginia Cavaiers | (United States) George Gelnovatch | |
| Virginia Tech Hokies | (United States) Mike Brizendine | |
| Wake Forest Demon Deacons | (United States) Bobby Muuss | |

== Preseason ==
=== Hermann Trophy ===
Prior to the season two ACC men's soccer players were selected to the MAC Hermann Trophy watch list.

- Alex Comsia, North Carolina
- Jonny Sutherland, Clemson

=== Preseason poll ===
The 2018 ACC preseason poll was announced on August 15. Wake Forest and North Carolina were selected to win the Atlantic Division and Coastal Division, respectively. North Carolina was selected as the favorite to win the ACC Championship. The poll was voted on by all ACC coaches, for a total of 12 possible votes.

ACC championship votes

1. North Carolina (10)
2. Louisville (1)
3. Wake Forest (1)

Regular season poll
First place votes shown in ().

Atlantic Division poll
1. Wake Forest (8) – 64
2. Clemson (4) – 60
3. Louisville – 53
4. NC State – 31
5. Syracuse – 29
6. Boston College – 15
Coastal Division poll
1. North Carolina (11) – 70
2. Virginia (1) – 53
3. Duke – 46
4. Notre Dame – 40
5. Pittsburgh – 28
6. Virginia Tech – 15

=== Preseason national polls ===
Eight of the programs were ranked in one of the five major preseason polls. CollegeSoccerNews.com and Hero Sports use a Top 30 ranking throughout the season, while United Soccer, Soccer America, and Top Drawer Soccer use a Top 25 ranking throughout the season.

| | United; Soccer | CSN | Hero; Sports | Soccer; America | TopDrawer; Soccer |
| Boston College | | | | | |
| Clemson | 11 | 12 | 8 | 9 | 12 |
| Duke | 10 | 9 | 9 | 14 | 13 |
| Louisville | 6 | 5 | 7 | 8 | 7 |
| NC State | | 29 | | 23 | 23 |
| North Carolina | 3 | 3 | 4 | 2 | 4 |
| Notre Dame | 17 | 20 | 19 | 21 | 20 |
| Pittsburgh | | | | | |
| Syracuse | | | | | |
| Virginia | 15 | 15 | 11 | 17 | 16 |
| Virginia Tech | | | | | |
| Wake Forest | 5 | 8 | 3 | 6 | 3 |

== Regular season ==
Index to colors and formatting
ACC member won
ACC member lost
ACC member tied
ACC teams in **bold**

All times Eastern time.

=== Week 1 (Aug 20–26) ===
Schedule and results:

| Date | Time (ET) | Visiting team | Home team | Site | TV | Result | Attendance |
|---|---|---|---|---|---|---|---|
| August 24 | 4:00 PM | **Boston College** | Quinnipiac | Quinnipiac Soccer Stadium • Hamden, CT | None | **W** 2–1 | 687 |
| August 24 | 4:00 PM | **Virginia Tech** | Air Force | Sentara Park • Harrisonburg, VA | None | **W** 2–1 | N/A |
| August 24 | 7:00 PM | New Hampshire | **#15 Virginia** | Klöckner Stadium • Charlottesville, VA | ACC Network Extra | **W** 1–0 | 1,821 |
| August 24 | 7:00 PM | Saint Louis | **#17 Notre Dame** | Alumni Stadium • South Bend, IN | ACC Network Extra | **T** 1–1 | 1,079 |
| August 24 | 7:00 PM | USC Upstate | **NC State** | Dail Soccer Field • Raleigh, NC | ACC Network Extra | **W** 3–1 | 1,938 |
| August 24 | 7:30 PM | ETSU | **#3 North Carolina** | Bryan Park • Greensboro, NC | ACC Network Extra | **W** 1–0 | 367 |
| August 24 | 7:30 PM | #20 FIU | **#10 Duke** | Koskinen Stadium • Durham, NC | ACC Network Extra | **W** 3–1 | 1,087 |
| August 24 | 7:30 PM | #2 Indiana | **#5 Wake Forest** | Spry Stadium • Winston–Salem, NC | ACC Network Extra | **W** 2–1 (2OT) | 4,751 |
| August 24 | 7:30 PM | St. Bonaventure | **#6 Louisville** | Lynn Stadium • Louisville, KY | ACC Network Extra | **W** 2–1 | 1,601 |
| August 24 | 8:00 PM | **#11 Clemson** | Creighton | Al F. Caniglia Field • Omaha, NE | Fox Sports Go | **L** 0–2 | 5,473 |
| August 24 | 8:00 PM | #25 Colgate | **Pittsburgh** | Ambrose Urbanic Field • Pittsburgh, PA | ACC Network Extra | **L** 0–1 | 1,138 |
| August 24 | 10:00 PM | **Syracuse** | Oregon State | Paul Lorenz Field at Patrick Wayne Valley Stadium • Corvallis, OR | Pac-12 Network | **W** 2–1 | 401 |
| August 26 | 2:30 PM | **#11 Clemson** | Omaha | Al F. Caniglia Field • Omaha, NE | None | **W** 1–0 | 565 |
| August 26 | 2:30 PM | Vermont | **#10 Duke** | Koskinen Stadium • Durham, NC | ACC Network Extra | **W** 3–2 (OT) | 502 |
| August 26 | 4:00 PM | **Virginia Tech** | Gardner–Webb | Sentara Park • Harrisonburg, VA | None | **W** 2–1 (OT) | N/A |
| August 26 | 7:00 PM | ETSU | **#5 Wake Forest** | Spry Stadium • Winston–Salem, NC | ACC Network Extra | **W** 4–2 | 1,470 |
| August 26 | 7:30 PM | #2 Indiana | **#3 North Carolina** | WakeMed Soccer Park • Cary, NC | ACC Network Extra | **L** 0–1 | 2,864 |
| August 26 | 10:00 PM | **Syracuse** | Portland | Merlo Field • Portland, OR | None | **L** 1–2 | 1,952 |

Players of the week:

| Offensive | | Defensive | |
| Player | Team | Player | Team |
|---|---|---|---|
| Bruno Lapa | Wake Forest | Colin Shutler | Virginia |
Reference: ACC

=== Week 2 (Aug 27–Sept 2) ===
Schedule and results:

| Date | Time (ET) | Visiting team | Home team | Site | TV | Result | Attendance |
|---|---|---|---|---|---|---|---|
| August 27 | 5:00 PM | Boston | **Boston College** | Newton Soccer Complex • Chestnut Hill, MA | None | **T** 3–3 | 630 |
| August 27 | 7:00 PM | **Pittsburgh** | Delaware | Stuart and Grant Stadium • Newark, DE | None | **W** 6–1 | 265 |
| August 27 | 7:00 PM | **NC State** | #4 Akron | FirstEnergy Stadium • Akron, OH | ACC Network Extra | **W** 2–1 | 1,474 |
| August 28 | 7:30 PM | Georgia State | **#9 Louisville** | Lynn Stadium • Louisville, KY | ACC Network Extra | **W** 1–0 | 1,095 |
| August 30 | 7:00 PM | Elon | **#7 Virginia** | Klöckner Stadium • Charlottesville, VA | ACC Network Extra | Canceled | 0 |
| August 31 | 5:00 PM | **#24 Notre Dame** | #18 Connecticut | Armstrong Stadium • Bloomington, IN | None | **W** 3–0 | N/A |
| August 31 | 7:00 PM | **Boston College** | Providence | Chapey Field at Anderson Stadium • Providence, RI | None | **T** 1–1 | 3,297 |
| August 31 | 7:00 PM | **Clemson** | South Carolina | Stone Stadium • Columbia, SC | None | **W** 2–0 | 4,441 |
| August 31 | 7:00 PM | **#12 North Carolina** | William & Mary | Albert–Daly Field • Williamsburg, VA | None | **W** 6–1 | 661 |
| August 31 | 7:00 PM | Presbyterian | **NC State** | Dail Soccer Field • Raleigh, NC | ACC Network Extra | **W** 2–0 | 1,622 |
| August 31 | 7:00 PM | **Virginia Tech** | South Florida | Corbett Soccer Stadium • Tampa, FL | None | **W** 1–0 | 903 |
| August 31 | 7:30 PM | Saint Louis | **#9 Louisville** | Lynn Stadium • Louisville, KY | ACC Network Extra | Canceled | 0 |
| August 31 | 8:30 PM | **#2 Duke** | San Diego | Torero Stadium • San Diego, CA | None | **W** 4–1 | 710 |
| September 1 | 7:00 PM | **Pittsburgh** | #4 Akron | FirstEnergy Stadium • Akron, OH | None | **L** 0–1 | 1,790 |
| September 1 | 7:00 PM | **#1 Wake Forest** | Florida Gulf Coast | FGCU Soccer Complex • Fort Myers, FL | None | **W** 3–1 | 1,017 |
| September 2 | 5:00 PM | **#24 Notre Dame** | #22 Dartmouth | Armstrong Stadium • Bloomington, IN | None | **W** 2–0 | N/A |
| September 2 | 6:00 PM | Hofstra | **Syracuse** | SU Soccer Stadium • Syracuse, NY | ACC Network Extra | **W** 4–3 | 1,387 |
| September 2 | 7:00 PM | **Virginia Tech** | UCF | UCF Soccer and Track Stadium • Orlando, FL | None | **T** 2–2 | 249 |

Players of the week:

| Offensive | | Defensive | |
| Player | Team | Player | Team |
|---|---|---|---|
| Gabriel Machado | NC State | Patrick Berneski | Notre Dame |
Reference: ACC

=== Week 3 (Sept 3–9) ===
Schedule and results:

| Date | Time (ET) | Visiting team | Home team | Site | TV | Result | Attendance |
|---|---|---|---|---|---|---|---|
| September 3 | 7:00 PM | Jacksonville | **#12 North Carolina** | Koskinen Stadium • Durham, NC | ACC Network Extra | **W** 2–0 | 239 |
| September 3 | 7:00 PM | Villanova | **Clemson** | Riggs Field • Clemson, SC | None | **W** 2–0 | 2,137 |
| September 3 | 7:00 PM | **#7 Virginia** | Maryland | Audi Field • Washington, D.C. | None | **T** 0–0 | 3,527 |
| September 3 | 7:00 PM | William & Mary | **NC State** | Dail Soccer Field • Raleigh, NC | ACC Network Extra | **W** 2–1 (2OT) | 854 |
| September 4 | 7:00 PM | Presbyterian | **#1 Wake Forest** | Spry Stadium • Winston–Salem, NC | ACC Network Extra | **W** 4–1 | 1,113 |
| September 4 | 7:30 PM | **#7 Louisville** | Kentucky | Wendell & Vickie Bell Soccer Complex • Lexington, KY | SEC Network + | **L** 0–3 | 1,827 |
| September 7 | 7:00 PM | **Clemson** | **Boston College** | Newton Soccer Complex • Chestnut Hill, MA | ACC Network Extra | 2–3 | 820 |
| September 7 | 7:00 PM | **#8 NC State** | **#1 Wake Forest** | Spry Stadium • Winston–Salem, NC | ACC Network Extra | 0–3 | 4,023 |
| September 7 | 7:00 PM | **#12 Notre Dame** | **Syracuse** | SU Soccer Stadium • Syracuse, NY | ACC Network Extra | 3–2 | 1,908 |
| September 7 | 7:00 PM | **#21 Virginia Tech** | **#10 Virginia** | Klöckner Stadium • Charlottesville, VA | ACC Network Extra | 1–1 (2OT) | 2,892 |
| September 8 | 7:00 PM | **Pittsburgh** | **#5 North Carolina** | Koskinen Stadium • Durham, NC | ACC Network Extra | 1–2 (2OT) | 573 |
| September 9 | 1:00 PM | **Clemson** | UMass | Rudd Field • Amherst, MA | None | **T** 0–0 (2OT) | – |
| September 9 | 2:00 PM | **#2 Duke** | **#7 Louisville** | Lynn Stadium • Louisville, KY | ACC Network Extra | 3–0 | 1,104 |

Players of the week:

| Offensive | | Defensive | |
| Player | Team | Player | Team |
|---|---|---|---|
| Simon Enstrom | Boston College | Felicien Dumas | Notre Dame |
| Omir Fernandez | Wake Forest | Felicien Dumas | Notre Dame |
Reference: ACC

=== Week 4 (Sept 10–16) ===
Schedule and results:

| Date | Time (ET) | Visiting team | Home team | Site | TV | Result | Attendance |
|---|---|---|---|---|---|---|---|
| September 10 | 7:00 PM | **Syracuse** | Cornell | Charles F. Berman Field • Ithaca, NY | ESPN+ | **W** 2–0 | 211 |
| September 11 | 12:30 PM | Quinnipiac | **#18 NC State** | Dail Soccer Field • Raleigh, NC | ACC Network Extra | **W** 1–0 | 197 |
| September 11 | 6:00 PM | Holy Cross | **Boston College** | Newton Soccer Complex • Chestnut Hill, MA | None | **T** 1–1 | 271 |
| September 11 | 7:00 PM | Georgia Southern | **#1 Wake Forest** | Spry Stadium • Winston–Salem, NC | None | **W** 2–0 | 1,017 |
| September 11 | 7:00 PM | #2 Indiana | **#8 Notre Dame** | Alumni Stadium • South Bend, IN | ACC Network Extra | **L** 1–2 (OT) | 1,500 |
| September 11 | 7:00 PM | Marshall | **#19 Virginia** | Klöckner Stadium • Charlottesville, VA | ACC Network Extra | **W** 1–0 | 1,069 |
| September 11 | 7:00 PM | **#3 North Carolina** | Davidson | Alumni Soccer Stadium • Davidson, NC | None | **W** 1–0 | 815 |
| September 11 | 7:00 PM | **#16 Virginia Tech** | UNCG | UNCG Soccer Stadium • Greensboro, NC | None | **W** 2–0 | 363 |
| September 12 | 11:00 AM | **Pittsburgh** | VCU | Sports Backers Stadium • Richmond, VA | None | **W** 1–0 | 360 |
| September 14 | 5:00 PM | **#3 North Carolina** | **#10 Duke** | Koskinen Stadium • Durham, NC | | Postponed Due to Hurricane Florence | |
| September 14 | 5:30 PM | **#1 Wake Forest** | **#16 Virginia Tech** | Thompson Field • Blacksburg, VA | ACC Network Extra | 2–1 | 1,200 |
| September 14 | 7:00 PM | **#7 Louisville** | **Boston College** | Newton Soccer Complex • Chestnut Hill, MA | ACC Network Extra | 1–0 | 768 |
| September 14 | 7:00 PM | **#18 NC State** | **Pittsburgh** | Ambrose Urbanic Field • Pittsburgh, PA | | Postponed Due to Hurricane Florence | |
| September 14 | 7:00 PM | **#8 Notre Dame** | **#19 Virginia** | Klockner Stadium • Charlottesville, VA | | Postponed Due to Hurricane Florence | |
| September 14 | 7:30 PM | **Syracuse** | **Clemson** | Riggs Field • Clemson, SC | | Postponed Due to Hurricane Florence | |

Players of the week:

| Offensive | | Defensive | |
| Player | Team | Player | Team |
|---|---|---|---|
| Omir Fernandez | Wake Forest | Colin Shutler | Virginia |
Reference: ACC

=== Week 5 (Sept 17–23) ===
Schedule and results:

| Date | Time (ET) | Visiting team | Home team | Site | TV | Result | Attendance |
|---|---|---|---|---|---|---|---|
| September 17 | 7:00 PM | #4 Michigan State | **#8 Notre Dame** | Alumni Stadium • South Bend, IN | ACC Network Extra | **L** 0–1 | 718 |
| September 18 | 7:00 PM | Detroit | **Pittsburgh** | Ambrose Urbanic Field • Pittsburgh, PA | ACC Network Extra | **W** 2–0 | 401 |
| September 18 | 7:00 PM | **#3 North Carolina** | UNCG | UNCG Soccer Stadium • Greensboro, NC | ESPN+ | Cancelled due to Hurricane Florence | |
| September 18 | 7:00 PM | FIU | **#22 Virginia** | Klockner Stadium • Charlottesville, VA | ACC Network Extra | **W** 2–0 | 1,337 |
| September 18 | 7:00 PM | Furman | **Clemson** | Riggs Field • Clemson, SC | ACC Network Extra | **W** 5–2 | 1,998 |
| September 18 | 7:00 PM | Georgetown | **#9 Duke** | Koskinen Stadium • Durham, NC | ACC Network Extra | **L** 0–1 | 454 |
| September 18 | 7:00 PM | Longwood | **#14 Virginia Tech** | Thompson Field • Blacksburg, VA | ACC Network Extra | **W** 5–1 | 217 |
| September 18 | 7:30 PM | Charlotte | **#6 Louisville** | Lynn Stadium • Louisville, KY | ACC Network Extra | **T** 2–2 (2OT) | 1,151 |
| September 21 | 7:00 PM | **Boston College** | **#9 Duke** | Koskinen Stadium • Durham, NC | ACC Network Extra | 2–3 | 710 |
| September 21 | 7:00 PM | **#3 North Carolina** | **#8 Notre Dame** | Alumni Stadium • South Bend, IN | ACC Network Extra | 1–0 (2OT) | 1,724 |
| September 21 | 7:00 PM | **#22 Virginia** | **Syracuse** | SU Soccer Stadium • Syracuse, NY | ACC Network Extra | 2–0 | 1,080 |
| September 21 | 7:00 PM | **#14 Virginia Tech** | **#18 NC State** | Dail Soccer Field • Raleigh, NC | ACC Network Extra | 1–0 | 786 |
| September 21 | 7:00 PM | **#1 Wake Forest** | **Clemson** | Riggs Field • Clemson, SC | ACC Network Extra | 3–0 | 3,259 |
| September 21 | 7:30 PM | **Pittsburgh** | **#6 Louisville** | Lynn Stadium • Louisville, KY | ACC Network Extra | 0–1 | 1,604 |

Players of the week:

| Offensive | | Defensive | |
| Player | Team | Player | Team |
|---|---|---|---|
| Giovanni Montesdeoca | North Carolina | Leon Krapf | NC State |
Reference: ACC

=== Week 6 (Sept 24–30) ===
Schedule and results:

| Date | Time (ET) | Visiting team | Home team | Site | TV | Result | Attendance |
|---|---|---|---|---|---|---|---|
| September 24 | 7:00 PM | Colgate | **Syracuse** | SU Soccer Stadium • Syracuse, NY | ACC Network Extra | **T** 1–1 (2OT) | 1,021 |
| September 25 | 4:00 PM | **#6 Louisville** | Georgetown | Shaw Field • Washington, D.C. | None | **W** 2–1 | 395 |
| September 25 | 7:00 PM | Davidson | **#1 Wake Forest** | Spry Stadium • Winston–Salem, NC | None | **W** 5–1 | 1,357 |
| September 25 | 7:00 PM | George Washington | **#15 Duke** | Koskinen Stadium • Durham, NC | None | **T** 0–0 (2OT) | 359 |
| September 25 | 7:00 PM | **#12 NC State** | **Pittsburgh** | Ambrose Urbanic Field • Pittsburgh, PA | ACC Network Extra | 1–3 | 254 |
| September 25 | 7:00 PM | #22 Xavier | **#20 Notre Dame** | Alumni Stadium • South Bend, IN | None | **W** 4–1 | 736 |
| September 28 | 7:00 PM | **Boston College** | **#20 Notre Dame** | Alumni Stadium • South Bend, IN | ACC Network Extra | 0–1 | 1,456 |
| September 28 | 7:00 PM | **Clemson** | **#3 North Carolina** | WakeMed Soccer Park • Cary, NC | ACC Network Extra | 0–2 | 1,876 |
| September 28 | 7:00 PM | **#6 Louisville** | **#12 NC State** | Dail Soccer Field • Raleigh, NC | ACC Network Extra | 2–2 (2OT) | 1,255 |
| September 28 | 7:00 PM | **Syracuse** | **#21 Virginia Tech** | Thompson Field • Blacksburg, VA | ACC Network Extra | 0–1 (2OT) | 927 |
| September 28 | 7:00 PM | **#11 Virginia** | **Pittsburgh** | Ambrose Urbanic Field • Pittsburgh, PA | ACC Network Extra | 2–0 | 710 |
| September 29 | 7:00 PM | **#15 Duke** | **#1 Wake Forest** | Spry Stadium • Winston–Salem, NC | ACC Network Extra | 2–4 | 4,937 |

Players of the week:

| Offensive | | Defensive | |
| Player | Team | Player | Team |
|---|---|---|---|
| Giovanni Montesdeoca | North Carolina | Alex Comsia | North Carolina |
Reference: ACC

=== Week 7 (Oct 1–7) ===
Schedule and results:

| Date | Time (ET) | Visiting team | Home team | Site | TV | Result | Attendance |
|---|---|---|---|---|---|---|---|
| October 1 | 7:00 PM | **Syracuse** | Akron | FirstEnergy Stadium • Akron, OH | ESPN+ | **W** 3–1 | 1,598 |
| October 2 | 6:40 PM | Columbia | **Pittsburgh** | Ambrose Urbanic Field • Pittsburgh, PA | ACC Network Extra | **W** 1–0 | 352 |
| October 2 | 7:00 PM | College of Charleston | **Clemson** | Riggs Field • Clemson, SC | None | **W** 3–1 | 1,377 |
| October 2 | 7:00 PM | James Madison | **#17 NC State** | Dail Soccer Field • Raleigh, NC | ACC Network Extra | **T** 0–0 (2OT) | 810 |
| October 2 | 7:00 PM | South Carolina | **#19 Virginia Tech** | Thompson Field • Blacksburg, VA | ACC Network Extra | **L** 1–2 (2OT) | 323 |
| October 2 | 7:00 PM | UNCG | **#1 Wake Forest** | Spry Stadium • Winston–Salem, NC | ACC Network Extra | **W** 2–0 | 1,819 |
| October 2 | 7:00 PM | #12 UNC Wilmington | **#3 North Carolina** | WakeMed Soccer Park • Cary, NC | None | **W** 1–0 | 1,017 |
| October 2 | 7:00 PM | Wofford | **#23 Duke** | Koskinen Stadium • Durham, NC | ACC Network Extra | **W** 4–2 | 372 |
| October 2 | 7:00 PM | Wright State | **#10 Virginia** | Klockner Stadium • Charlottesville, VA | ACC Network Extra | **W** 2–1 | 1,178 |
| October 2 | 8:00 PM | **#15 Notre Dame** | Northwestern | Martin Stadium • Evanston, IL | BTN + | **W** 3–0 | 372 |
| October 5 | 7:00 PM | **Clemson** | **Pittsburgh** | Ambrose Urbanic Field • Pittsburgh, PA | None | 1–2 (2OT) | 653 |
| October 5 | 7:00 PM | **#23 Duke** | **#10 Virginia** | Klockner Stadium • Charlottesville, VA | ACC Network Extra | 2–0 | 2,129 |
| October 5 | 7:00 PM | **#17 NC State** | **Boston College** | Newton Soccer Complex • Chestnut Hill, MA | ACC Network Extra | 0–1 | 281 |
| October 5 | 7:00 PM | **#1 Wake Forest** | **Syracuse** | SU Soccer Stadium • Syracuse, NY | ACC Network Extra | 0–2 | 1,957 |
| October 6 | 7:00 PM | **#6 Louisville** | **#15 Notre Dame** | Alumni Stadium • South Bend, IN | ACC Network Extra | 1–2 (OT) | 646 |
| October 6 | 7:00 PM | **#19 Virginia Tech** | **#3 North Carolina** | Koskinen Stadium • Durham, NC | ACC Network Extra | 1–2 | 2,074 |

Players of the week:

| Offensive | | Defensive | |
| Player | Team | Player | Team |
|---|---|---|---|
| Sean MacLeod | Notre Dame | Hendrik Hilpert | Syracuse |
Reference: ACC

=== Week 8 (Oct 8–14) ===
Schedule and results:

| Date | Time (ET) | Visiting team | Home team | Site | TV | Result | Attendance |
|---|---|---|---|---|---|---|---|
| October 8 | 6:00 PM | #5 Denver | **#10 Virginia** | Klockner Stadium • Charlottesville, VA | ACC Network Extra | **W** 3–0 | 1,430 |
| October 8 | 7:00 PM | Cleveland State | **Pittsburgh** | Ambrose Urbanic Field • Pittsburgh, PA | ACC Network Extra | **L** 3–4 | 351 |
| October 8 | 7:00 PM | Ohio State | **Syracuse** | SU Soccer Stadium • Syracuse, NY | ACC Network Extra | **W** 3–0 | 1,856 |
| October 9 | 7:00 PM | Campbell | **#17 Duke** | Koskinen Stadium • Durham, NC | ACC Network Extra | **W** 2–0 | 349 |
| October 9 | 7:00 PM | Harvard | **Boston College** | Newton Soccer Complex • Chestnut Hill, MA | None | **W** 1–0 | 196 |
| October 9 | 7:00 PM | **#1 North Carolina** | Old Dominion | Old Dominion Soccer Complex • Norfolk, VA | None | **T** 1–1 (2OT) | 775 |
| October 9 | 7:00 PM | Georgia Southern | **#11 Louisville** | Lynn Stadium • Louisville, KY | ACC Network Extra | **W** 1–0 | 1,207 |
| October 9 | 7:00 PM | High Point | **#2 Wake Forest** | Spry Stadium • Winston–Salem, NC | ACC Network Extra | **W** 4–2 | 1,783 |
| October 9 | 7:00 PM | **NC State** | Longwood | Longwood Athletics Complex • Farmville, VA | ESPN+ | **W** 2–0 | 187 |
| October 12 | 7:00 PM | **Pittsburgh** | **Virginia Tech** | Thompson Field • Blacksburg, VA | ACC Network Extra | 1–3 | 834 |
| October 12 | 7:00 PM | **#1 North Carolina** | **NC State** | Dail Soccer Field • Raleigh, NC | ACC Network Extra | 0–1 | 3,229 |
| October 12 | 7:00 PM | **#9 Notre Dame** | **#17 Duke** | Koskinen Stadium • Durham, NC | ACC Network Extra | 2–3 | 892 |
| October 12 | 7:00 PM | **#24 Syracuse** | **#11 Louisville** | Lynn Stadium • Louisville, KY | ACC Network Extra | 2–2 (2OT) | 1,468 |
| October 12 | 7:00 PM | **#14 Virginia** | **Clemson** | Riggs Field • Clemson, SC | ACC Network Extra | 4–1 | 1,463 |
| October 12 | 8:00 PM | **Boston College** | **#2 Wake Forest** | Spry Stadium • Winston–Salem, NC | RSN | 1–2 | 3,111 |

Players of the week:

| Offensive | | Defensive | |
| Player | Team | Player | Team |
|---|---|---|---|
| David Loera | NC State | Leon Krapf | NC State |
| Daryl Dike | Virginia | Leon Krapf | NC State |
Reference: ACC

=== Week 9 (Oct 15–21) ===
Schedule and results:

| Date | Time (ET) | Visiting team | Home team | Site | TV | Result | Attendance |
|---|---|---|---|---|---|---|---|
| October 15 | 7:00 PM | Temple | **Pittsburgh** | Ambrose Urbanic Field • Pittsburgh, PA | ACC Network Extra | **W** 3–2 | 414 |
| October 16 | 6:00 PM | **#16 Notre Dame** | #18 Michigan | U–M Soccer Stadium • Ann Arbor, MI | Big Ten Network | **W** 2–1 | 1,536 |
| October 16 | 7:00 PM | **Boston College** | #20 Connecticut | Morrone Stadium • Storrs, CT | None | **L** 2–3 | 2,046 |
| October 16 | 7:00 PM | #22 Coastal Carolina | **Clemson** | Riggs Field • Clemson, SC | ACC Network Extra | **L** 0–1 | 1,222 |
| October 16 | 7:00 PM | High Point | **#14 Duke** | Koskinen Stadium • Durham, NC | ACC Network Extra | **L** 0–1 | 493 |
| October 16 | 7:00 PM | Lipscomb | **#10 Louisville** | Lynn Stadium • Louisville, KY | ACC Network Extra | **L** 2–3 | 1,069 |
| October 16 | 7:00 PM | **#21 NC State** | #11 UNC Wilmington | UNC Wilmington Soccer Stadium • Wilmington, NC | None | **L** 0–3 | 2,028 |
| October 16 | 7:00 PM | Radford | **#6 Virginia** | Klockner Stadium • Charlottesville, VA | ACC Network Extra | **W** 2–1 | 1,254 |
| October 16 | 7:00 PM | St. Bonaventure | **#24 Syracuse** | SU Soccer Stadium • Syracuse, NY | ACC Network Extra | **W** 7–0 | 727 |
| October 16 | 7:00 PM | **#1 Wake Forest** | South Carolina | Stone Stadium • Columbia, SC | None | **W** 2–0 | 2,250 |
| October 16 | 7:00 PM | William & Mary | **Virginia Tech** | Thompson Field • Blacksburg, VA | ACC Network Extra | **W** 4–0 | 324 |
| October 16 | 7:00 PM | Winthrop | **#5 North Carolina** | WakeMed Soccer Park • Cary, NC | ACC Network Extra | **W** 4–0 | 244 |
| October 19 | 7:00 PM | **#5 North Carolina** | **Boston College** | Newton Soccer Complex • Chestnut Hill, MA | | 2–0 | 572 |
| October 19 | 7:00 PM | **Pittsburgh** | **#14 Duke** | Koskinen Stadium • Durham, NC | ACC Network Extra | 1–3 | 701 |
| October 19 | 7:00 PM | **Virginia Tech** | **#16 Notre Dame** | Alumni Stadium • South Bend, IN | ACC Network Extra | 5–2 | 514 |
| October 20 | 7:00 PM | **Clemson** | **#10 Louisville** | Lynn Stadium • Louisville, KY | ACC Network Extra | 0–1 (2OT) | 1,808 |
| October 20 | 7:00 PM | **#24 Syracuse** | **#21 NC State** | Dail Soccer Field • Raleigh, NC | ACC Network Extra | 1–1 (2OT) | 758 |
| October 20 | 7:00 PM | **#1 Wake Forest** | **#6 Virginia** | Klöckner Stadium • Charlottesville, VA | ACC Network Extra | 3–2 | 2,791 |

Players of the week:

| Offensive | | Defensive | |
| Player | Team | Player | Team |
|---|---|---|---|
| Kristo Strickler | Virginia Tech | Logan Gdula | Wake Forest |
Reference: ACC

=== Week 10 (Oct 22–28) ===
Schedule and results:

| Date | Time (ET) | Visiting team | Home team | Site | TV | Result | Attendance |
|---|---|---|---|---|---|---|---|
| October 23 | 7:00 PM | Boston College | Rhode Island | URI Soccer Complex • Kingston, RI | None | **L** 1–2 | 400 |
| October 23 | 7:00 PM | #5 North Carolina | **#14 Duke** | Koskinen Stadium • Durham, NC | ESPNU | 1–0 | 1,600 |
| October 23 | 7:00 PM | Pittsburgh | West Virginia | Dick Dlesk Soccer Stadium • Morgantown, WV | None | **L** 1–2 | 737 |
| October 23 | 7:00 PM | #20 Syracuse | **Clemson** | Riggs Field • Clemson, SC | ACC Network Extra | 2–3 | 1,260 |
| October 23 | 7:00 PM | #6 Virginia | **#23 Notre Dame** | Alumni Stadium • South Bend, IN | ACC Network Extra | 0–0 (2OT) | 2,356 |
| October 23 | 7:00 PM | Virginia Tech | Davidson | Alumni Soccer Stadium • Davidson, NC | ESPN+ | **T** 2–2 | 302 |
| October 26 | 7:00 PM | Boston College | **#20 Syracuse** | SU Soccer Stadium • Syracuse, NY | ACC Network Extra | 0–0 (2OT) | 1,573 |
| October 26 | 7:00 PM | #14 Duke | **#18 Virginia Tech** | Thompson Field • Blacksburg, VA | ACC Network Extra | 2–0 | 274 |
| October 26 | 7:00 PM | #17 Louisville | **#1 Wake Forest** | Spry Stadium • Winston-Salem, NC | ACC Network Extra | 1–2 (OT) | 1,165 |
| October 26 | 7:00 PM | #6 Virginia | **#5 North Carolina** | WakeMed Soccer Park • Cary, NC | ACC Network Extra | Cancelled | – |
| October 27 | 7:00 PM | NC State | **Clemson** | Riggs Field • Clemson, SC | ACC Network Extra | 0–3 | 1,657 |
| October 27 | 7:00 PM | #23 Notre Dame | **Pittsburgh** | Ambrose Urbanic Field • Pittsburgh, PA | ACC Network Extra | 1–0 | 409 |

Players of the week:

| Offensive | | Defensive | |
| Player | Team | Player | Team |
|---|---|---|---|
| Robbie Robinson | Clemson | Patrick Bunk-Andersen | Clemson |
Reference: ACC

=== Week 11 (Oct 29–Nov 4) ===
Schedule and results:
Note: Rankings shown are seedings from ACC tournament

| Date | Time (ET) | Visiting team | Home team | Site | TV | Result | Attendance | Note |
|---|---|---|---|---|---|---|---|---|
| October 31 | 7:00 PM | 9 Boston College | 8 NC State | Dail Soccer Field • Raleigh, NC | ACC Network Extra | 1–3 | 437 | ACC tournament First Round |
| October 31 | 7:00 PM | 12 Clemson | 5 Notre Dame | Alumni Stadium • South Bend, IN | ACC Network Extra | 0–2 | 191 | ACC tournament First Round |
| October 31 | 7:00 PM | 11 Pittsburgh | 6 Virginia | Klockner Stadium • Charlottesville, VA | ACC Network Extra | 2–0 | 510 | ACC tournament First Round |
| October 31 | 7:00 PM | 10 Syracuse | 7 Virginia Tech | Thompson Field • Blacksburg, VA | ACC Network Extra | 3–1 | 294 | ACC tournament First Round |
| November 4 | 1:00 PM | 8 NC State | 1 Wake Forest | Spry Stadium • Winston-Salem, NC | ACC Network Extra | 0–2 | 2,037 | ACC tournament quarterfinals |
| November 4 | 1:00 PM | 7 Virginia Tech | 2 North Carolina | WakeMed Soccer Park • Cary, NC | ACC Network Extra | 0–3 | 507 | ACC tournament quarterfinals |
| November 4 | 1:00 PM | 11 Pittsburgh | 3 Duke | Koskinen Stadium • Durham, NC | ACC Network Extra | 0–0 (3–4 PKs) | 342 | ACC tournament quarterfinals |
| November 4 | 1:00 PM | 5 Notre Dame | 4 Louisville | Lynn Stadium • Louisville, KY | ACC Network Extra | 0–1 | 667 | ACC tournament quarterfinals |

=== Week 12 (Nov 5–11) ===
Schedule and results: Note: Rankings shown are seedings from ACC tournament

| Date | Time (ET) | Visiting team | Home team | Site | TV | Result | Attendance | Note |
|---|---|---|---|---|---|---|---|---|
| November 7 | 7:00 PM | **4 Louisville** | **1 Wake Forest** | Spry Stadium • Winston-Salem, NC | ACC Network Extra | 2–1 (OT) | 2,117 | ACC tournament semifinals |
| November 7 | 7:00 PM | **3 Duke** | **2 North Carolina** | WakeMed Soccer Park • Cary, NC | ACC Network Extra | 1–2 | 586 | ACC tournament semifinals |
| November 11 | 12:00 PM | **4 Louisville** | **2 North Carolina** | Sahlen's Stadium • Cary, North Carolina | ESPNU | 1–0 | 1,402 | ACC tournament Final |

== Rankings ==
=== United Soccer ===
Legend
| Increase in ranking |
| Decrease in ranking |
| Not ranked previous week |

| | Pre | Wk 1 | Wk 2 | Wk 3 | Wk 4 | Wk 5 | Wk 6 | Wk 7 | Wk 8 | Wk 9 | Wk 10 | Wk 11 | Wk 12 | Final |
|---|---|---|---|---|---|---|---|---|---|---|---|---|---|---|
| Boston College | | | | RV | | | | | | | | | | |
| Clemson | 11 | RV | RV | RV | RV | | | | | | | | | |
| Duke | 10 | 2 | 2 | 10 | 9 | 15 | 23 | 17 | 14 | 14 | 8 | 8 | 10 | 11 |
| Louisville | 6 | 9 | 7 | 7 | 6 | 6 | 6 | 11 | 10 | 17 | 15 | 10 | 5 | 16 |
| North Carolina | 3 | 12 | 5 | 3 | 3 | 3 | 3 | 1 | 5 | 5 | 4 | 4 | 6 | 14 |
| NC State | | RV | 8 | 18 | 18 | 12 | 17 | RV | 21 | RV | | | | RV |
| Notre Dame | 17 | 24 | 12 | 8 | 8 | 20 | 15 | 9 | 16 | 23 | 18 | 16 | 13 | 8 |
| Pittsburgh | RV | | | | | | | | | | | | | |
| Syracuse | | | | | | | | 24 | 24 | 20 | RV | RV | RV | RV |
| Virginia | 15 | 7 | 10 | 19 | 22 | 11 | 10 | 14 | 6 | 6 | 7 | 11 | 11 | 15 |
| Virginia Tech | | RV | 21 | 16 | 14 | 21 | 19 | RV | RV | 18 | 22 | 24 | 19 | 17 |
| Wake Forest | 5 | 1 | 1 | 1 | 1 | 1 | 1 | 2 | 1 | 1 | 1 | 1 | 2 | 6 |

=== Top Drawer Soccer ===
Legend
| Increase in ranking |
| Decrease in ranking |
| Not ranked previous week |

| | Pre | Wk 1 | Wk 2 | Wk 3 | Wk 4 | Wk 5 | Wk 6 | Wk 7 | Wk 8 | Wk 9 | Wk 10 | Wk 11 | Wk 12 | Wk 13 | Wk 14 | Wk 15 | Wk 16 | Final |
|---|---|---|---|---|---|---|---|---|---|---|---|---|---|---|---|---|---|---|
| Boston College | | | | | | | | | | | | | | | | | | |
| Clemson | 12 | 12 | | | | | | | | | | | | | | | | |
| Duke | 13 | 13 | 8 | 6 | 9 | 8 | 16 | 17 | 15 | 5 | 11 | 10 | 8 | 14 | 11 | 13 | 13 | 13 |
| Louisville | 7 | 7 | 7 | 3 | 5 | 5 | 5 | 5 | 9 | 12 | 19 | 16 | 9 | 2 | 18 | 18 | 18 | 18 |
| North Carolina | 4 | 4 | 6 | 10 | 10 | 9 | 7 | 8 | 5 | 7 | 6 | 5 | 4 | 5 | 19 | 19 | 19 | 19 |
| NC State | 23 | 23 | 17 | 4 | 6 | 6 | 8 | 13 | 23 | 20 | 24 | RV | | | 24 | 24 | 24 | 24 |
| Notre Dame | 20 | 20 | 16 | 21 | 12 | 11 | 19 | 14 | 8 | 11 | 17 | 11 | 13 | 12 | 13 | 6 | 7 | 7 |
| Pittsburgh | | | | | | | | | | | | | | | | | | |
| Syracuse | | | | | | RV | 23 | RV | RV | 23 | 23 | RV | RV | 20 | 22 | 22 | 22 | 22 |
| Virginia | 16 | 16 | 13 | 8 | 14 | 12 | 6 | 6 | 11 | 6 | 5 | 4 | 11 | 7 | 6 | 11 | 11 | 11 |
| Virginia Tech | | | 25 | 19 | 16 | 16 | 13 | 12 | 14 | 15 | 10 | 8 | 12 | 11 | 9 | 14 | 14 | 14 |
| Wake Forest | 3 | 3 | 1 | 1 | 1 | 1 | 1 | 1 | 2 | 1 | 1 | 1 | 1 | 3 | 2 | 9 | 9 | 9 |

== Postseason ==
=== ACC tournament ===
Semifinals
1 | Wake Forest | 1
4 | Louisville | 2 ^{OT}
3 | Duke | 1
2 | North Carolina | 2

Final
4 | Louisville | 1
2 | North Carolina | 0

=== NCAA tournament ===
| Seed | School | 1st round | 2nd round | 3rd round | Quarterfinals | Semifinals | Championship |
|---|---|---|---|---|---|---|---|
| 1 | Wake Forest | BYE | W 2–0 vs. Colgate – (Winston-Salem, NC) | L 0–1 vs. Akron – (Winston-Salem, NC) | | | |
| 4 | Louisville | BYE | L 1–2 vs. Michigan State – (Louisville, KY) | | | | |
| 5 | North Carolina | BYE | L 1–2 vs. James Madison – (Cary, NC) | | | | |
| 6 | Duke | BYE | W 2–0 vs. Pacific – (Durham, NC) | L 0–2 vs. Maryland – (Durham, NC) | | | |
| 7 | Notre Dame | BYE | T 0–0 (11–10 PKs) vs. Michigan – (South Bend, IN) | W 1–0 (OT) vs. Virginia – (South Bend, IN) | L 0–1 vs. Indiana – (Bloomington, IN) | | |
| 10 | Virginia | BYE | W 2–0 vs. Furman – (Charlottesville, VA) | L 0–1 (OT) vs. Notre Dame – (South Bend, IN) | | | |
| 12 | Virginia Tech | BYE | W 1–0 vs. Charlotte – (Blacksburg, VA) | L 0–3 vs. James Madison – (Blacksburg, VA) | | | |
| 16 | Syracuse | BYE | L 1–3 vs. Akron – (Syracuse, NY) | | | | |
| None | NC State | W 4–1 vs. Campbell – (Raleigh, NC) | L 0–2 vs. Maryland – (College Park, MD) | | | | |
| | W–L–T (%): | 1–0–0 (1.000) | 4–4–1 (.500) | 1–4–0 (.200) | 0–1–0 (.000) | 0–0–0 (–) | 0–0–0 (–) Total: 6–9–1 (.406) |

== Awards ==
=== Postseason awards ===
The Atlantic Coast Conference post season awards were announced on November 7, 2018, the same day as the Semifinals of the ACC tournament.

==== All-ACC awards and teams ====
2018 ACC Men's Soccer Individual Awards
| Award | Recipient(s) |
| Coach of the Year | Bobby Muuss – Wake Forest |
| Offensive Player of the Year | Omir Fernandez – Wake Forest |
| Midfielder of the Year | Bruno Lapa – Wake Forest |
| Defensive Player of the Year | Alex Comsia – North Carolina |
| Freshman of the Year | Issa Rayyan – Duke |

2018 ACC Men's Soccer All-Conference Teams
| First Team | Second Team | Third Team | Rookie Team |
| Daniele Proch, Jr., M, Duke; Tate Schmitt, Sr., F, Louisville; Nils Bruening, Sr., F, North Carolina; Alex Comsia, Sr., D, North Carolina; Mauricio Pineda, Jr., M, North Carolina; James Pyle, Sr., GK, North Carolina; David Loera, So., M, NC State; Edward Kizza, So., F, Pittsburgh; Tajon Buchanan, So., F, Syracuse; Omir Fernandez, So., M, Wake Forest; Bruno Lapa, Jr., M, Wake Forest | Simon Enstrom, Sr., F, Boston College; Will Pulisic, So., GK, Duke; Brandon Williamson, Jr, M., Duke; Issa Rayyan, Fr., M, Duke; Geoffrey Dee, Sr., M, Louisville; John Nelson, So., D, North Carolina; Thomas Ueland, Sr., F, Notre Dame; Patrick Berneski, Gr., D, Notre Dame; Javi Pérez, Sr., M, Pittsburgh; Kristo Strickler, So., F, Virginia Tech; Brad Dunwell, Sr., M, Wake Forest | Ciaran McKenna, Sr., M, Duke; Cherif Dieye, Jr., M, Louisville; Jack Skahan, Jr., M, North Carolina; Manny Perez, So., M, NC State; Tommy McCabe, Jr., M, Notre Dame; Félicien Dumas, Sr., D, Notre Dame; Kamal Miller, Sr, D, Syracuse; Joe Bell, So., M, Virginia; Henry Kessler, So., D, Virginia; Mathijs Swaneveld, So., GK, Virginia Tech; Sam Raben, Sr., D, Wake Forest | Kristofer Konradsson, Fr., M, Boston College; Charlie Asensio, Fr., D, Clemson; Issa Rayyan, Fr., M, Duke; Aedan Stanley, Fr., D, Duke; Chandler Vaughn, Fr., D, Pitt; Ryan Raposo, Fr., M, Syracuse; Daryl Dike, Fr., F, Virginia; Cabrel Happi Kamseu, Fr., F, Virginia; Aboubacar Keita, Fr., D, Virginia; Daniel Steedman, Fr., F, Virginia; Aristotle Zarris, Fr., F, Wake Forest |

==== All-Americans ====
===== United Soccer Coaches =====
2018 United Soccer Coaches All-Americans
| First Team | Second Team | Third Team |
| Alex Comsia – Defender – North Carolina; Bruno Lapa – Midfielder – Wake Forest; Omir Fernandez – Forward – Wake Forest | Brad Dunwell – Midfielder – Wake Forest; Mauricio Pineda – Midfielder – North Carolina; Daniele Proch – Forward – Duke | None |

== MLS SuperDraft ==
=== Total picks by school ===
| Team | Round 1 | Round 2 | Round 3 | Round 4 | Total |
|---|---|---|---|---|---|
| Clemson | 0 | 0 | 1 | 0 | 1 |
| Louisville | 0 | 1 | 0 | 0 | 1 |
| North Carolina | 1 | 0 | 0 | 0 | 1 |
| Notre Dame | 0 | 1 | 0 | 0 | 1 |
| Pittsburgh | 0 | 0 | 1 | 0 | 1 |
| Syracuse | 1 | 1 | 0 | 0 | 2 |
| Wake Forest | 1 | 0 | 1 | 0 | 2 |

=== List of selections ===
| Round | Pick # | MLS team | Player | Position | College | Other |
|---|---|---|---|---|---|---|
| 1 | 9 | New England Revolution | Tajon Buchanan | Forward | Syracuse | Generation Adidas |
| 1 | 10 | FC Dallas | John Nelson | Defender | North Carolina | Generation Adidas |
| 1 | 13 | FC Cincinnati | Logan Gdula | Defender | Wake Forest | |
| 2 | 27 | Orlando City | Kamal Miller | Defender | Syracuse | |
| 2 | 29 | FC Cincinnati | Tommy McCabe | Midfielder | Notre Dame | |
| 2 | 39 | Toronto FC | Adam Wilson | Midfielder | Louisville | |
| 3 | 54 | Toronto FC | Patrick Bunk-Andersen | Defender | Clemson | |
| 3 | 56 | Houston Dynamo | Brad Dunwell | Midfielder | Wake Forest | |
| 3 | 64 | Los Angeles FC | Javi Pérez | Midfielder | Pittsburgh | |

=== Homegrown contracts ===
| Original MLS team | Player | Position | College | Notes |
|---|---|---|---|---|
| Colorado Rapids | Sam Raben | DF | Wake Forest | |
| New York Red Bulls | Jean-Christophe Koffi | MF | Virginia | Received rights from D.C. United |
| Real Salt Lake | Tate Schmitt | FW | Louisville | |
