= Nathan Lewis (footballer) =

Trinidad and Tobago footballer

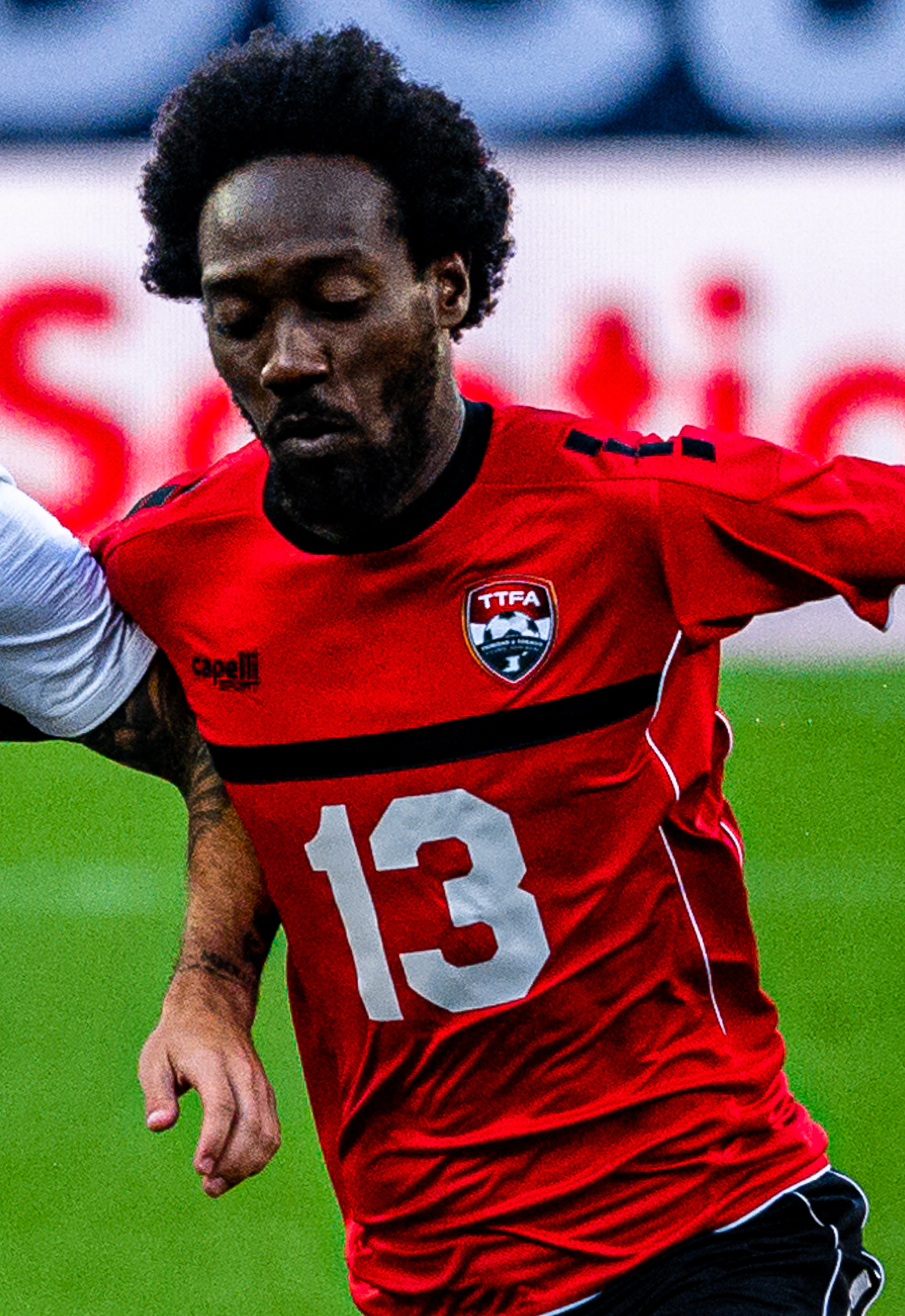
- Lewis with Trinidad and Tobago at the 2019 CONCACAF Gold Cup

Personal information
- Full name: Nathan Anthony Lewis
- Date of birth: 20 July 1990 (age 36)
- Place of birth: Maloney, Trinidad and Tobago
- Height: 1.78 m (5 ft 10 in)
- Position: Midfielder

Senior career*
| Years | Team | Apps | (Gls) |
| 2012–2015 | Caledonia AIA | | (10) |
| 2015–2017 | San Juan Jabloteh | | (23) |
| 2017–2018 | Central | | |
| 2018 | Indy Eleven | 11 | (0) |
| 2019 | Lansing Ignite | 2 | (0) |

International career^{‡}
| 2016– | Trinidad and Tobago | 29 | (4) |
- * Club domestic league appearances and goals as of 14 October 2019 ‡ National team caps and goals as of 10 November 2019

Nathan Anthony Lewis (born 20 July 1990) is a Trinidadian international footballer who plays as a midfielder.

== Club career ==
Born in Maloney, he has played club football in Trinidad for Caledonia AIA, San Juan Jabloteh and Central.

He signed for American team Indy Eleven in February 2018, alongside fellow Central teammate Carlyle Mitchell.

He signed for Lansing Ignite in January 2019. After their inaugural 2019 season, Lansing Ignite ceased operations.

== International career ==
He made his international debut for Trinidad and Tobago in 2016.

== Career statistics ==
=== International ===
Appearances and goals by national team and year
| National team | Year | Apps | Goals |
|---|---|---|---|
| Trinidad and Tobago | 2016 | 4 | 0 |
| Trinidad and Tobago | 2017 | 13 | 1 |
| Trinidad and Tobago | 2018 | 5 | 1 |
| Trinidad and Tobago | 2019 | 8 | 2 |
| Total | | 30 | 4 |

Scores and results list Trinidad and Tobago's goal tally first, score column indicates score after each Lewis goal.

List of international goals scored by Nathan Lewis
| No. | Date | Venue | Opponent | Score | Result | Competition |
|---|---|---|---|---|---|---|
| 1. | 29 April 2017 | Kirani James Athletic Stadium, St. George's, Grenada | Grenada | 1–1 | 2–2 | Friendly |
| 2. | 6 September 2018 | Estadi Montilivi, Girona, Spain | United Arab Emirates | 2–0 | 2–0 | Friendly |
| 3. | 10 November 2019 | Ato Boldon Stadium, Couva, Trinidad and Tobago | Anguilla | 4–0 | 15–0 | Friendly |
| 4. | 10 November 2019 | Ato Boldon Stadium, Couva, Trinidad and Tobago | Anguilla | –0 | 15–0 | Friendly |
