= Kevin Coiffic =

French footballer (born 1994)

Kévin Coiffic
Personal information
- Date of birth: 18 September 1994 (age 32)
- Place of birth: Lorient, France
- Height: 1.88 m (6 ft 2 in)
- Position: Centre-back

Team information
- Current team: Dinan-Léhon
- Number: 4

Youth career
- Lorient

College career
Years	Team	Apps	(Gls)
2016	Broward College Seahawks	16	(3)
2018	Young Harris Mountain Lions	19	(3)

Senior career*
Years	Team	Apps	(Gls)
2013	Lorient II	1	(0)
2016–2017	FC Miami City	27	(7)
2017–2018	US Montagnarde	8	(1)
2018	FC Miami City	9	(2)
2019	Lansing Ignite	23	(2)
2020–	Dinan-Léhon	95	(3)
- * Club domestic league appearances and goals as of 4 December 2025

Kévin Coiffic (born 18 September 1994) is a French footballer who plays as a centre-back for Dinan-Léhon FC.

== Career ==
Coiffic played for Lansing Ignite FC in USL League One in 2019. The club ceased operations after their inaugural 2019 season.
