= Lansing United =

- Full name: Lansing United
- Nickname(s): LanU, The Hoops
- Founded: 2014; 11 years ago
- Dissolved: 2018; 7 years ago
- Ground: Archer Stadium; East Lansing, MI
- Capacity: 1,500
- Owner: Jeremy Sampson
- 2018: 2nd, Great Lakes Division; Playoffs: Conference Semifinals
- Website: http://www.lanunited.com/
Home colours	Away colours

Lansing United was an American amateur soccer club based in East Lansing, Michigan that competed in the Premier Development League and the National Premier Soccer League. The club's men's team folded after the 2018 season, with Lansing Ignite FC beginning play in USL League One. The club continued to field a women's team in United Women's Soccer.

Among their most notable alumni is USMNT and New England Revolution defender DeJuan Jones, who competed for United while playing for Michigan State in 2018.

== History ==
=== Club Beginnings (2013–2017) ===
Lansing United was accepted into the National Premier Soccer League's Great Lakes West Conference of the Midwest Region in Fall of 2013. Ideas for names were solicited from the Greater Lansing community, and Lansing United was chosen. The club motto is "Pride, Passion and Unity" and is reflected in the team's logo, with the star representing pride, the flame representing passion, and the gear representing unity. The club also uses the Latin phrase "Coniunctis Viribus" which means "With Connected Strength."

Lansing United played its inaugural match in the NPSL in May 2014. They finished the regular season by winning the Great Lakes West championship. United went on to win the NPSL's Midwest Region Playoffs before ultimately losing in the semi-finals to eventual champion, New York Red Bulls U-23s.

The following year, the club secured its first U.S. Open Cup victory over Chicago's RWB Adria, before falling 1–0 to Louisville City FC of the USL.

Both the 2016 & 2017 seasons saw United finish mid-table despite promising starts to each campaign.

=== Premier Development League & United Women's Soccer (2017–2018) ===
Beginning in May 2018, Lansing United fielded both men's and women's squads. Lansing United men began competing in the United Soccer Leagues' Premier Development League after four years in the NPSL. They played in the Great Lakes Division of the Central Conference. Lansing United Women also began competition in the Midwest Division of United Women's Soccer.

== Stadium ==
The team played its home matches at Archer Stadium located in the East Lansing Soccer Complex. On July 9, 2017, a facility-record 1,388 people watched the team take on Detroit City FC.

United sometimes played at DeMartin Stadium on the Michigan State University campus, to facilitate larger crowds. A club-record, 2,014 people watched United secure the Great Lakes West championship over Detroit City FC on July 13, 2014.

== Head coaches ==
- (United States) Eric Rudland (2014–2015)
- (United States) Nate Miller (2015–2018)

== Notable Lansing United Players ==
- (England) Matt Brown formerly of R.C.S. Verviétois, current Youth Coach at Chelsea F.C.
- (United States) Brian Cunningham formerly of Harbour View F.C., Waitakere United
- (South Africa) Thabiso Khumalo formerly of D.C. United
- (Canada) Tyler Pasher currently with Houston Dynamo
- Lewis Jones, member of British Virgin Islands national football team
- (Germany) Lukas Muszong currently with Bremer SV

== Honors ==
=== Domestic League ===
- Midwest Region – Great Lakes West Conference (NPSL)
  - Champions (1): 2014
- Midwest Region (NPSL)
  - Playoff champions (1): 2014

== Team Records ==
As of July 20, 2018

=== Year-by-year ===
Year	Tier	League	Regular Season	Playoffs	U.S. Open Cup
2014	4	NPSL	1st of 5, Midwest-Great Lakes West (8–2–4)	National Semifinal	Not eligible
2015	4	NPSL	6th of 13, Midwest (6–4–2)	Did not qualify	Second Round
2016	4	NPSL	4th of 7, Midwest-Great Lakes West (4–4–4)	Did not qualify	Did not qualify
2017	4	NPSL	4th of 8, Midwest-Great Lakes (6–7–1)	Did not qualify	Did not qualify
2018	4	PDL	2nd of 6, Great Lakes (7–2–5)	Conference Semifinals	Did not qualify

=== All-Time Appearances ===
Rank	Name	Total
1	(England) James DeCosemo	43
2	(United States) Austin Dunn	39
3	(England) Matt Brown	29
4	(United States) Andrew Hill	27
5	(United States) Alec Greene	26

=== All-Time Goals ===
Rank	Name	Total
1	(England) Matt Brown	19
2	(England) James DeCosemo	13
3	(Brazil) Rafa Mentzingen	9
4	(South Africa) Tumi Moshobane	5
5	(United States) Brian Cunningham	3
5	(United States) Gabe Matteo	3
5	(Canada) Tyler Pasher	3

=== All-Time Assists ===
Rank	Name	Total
1	(Canada) Tyler Pasher	6
2	(United States) Dewey Lewis	5
3	(England) James DeCosemo	4
3	(South Africa) Tumi Moshobane	4

=== All-Time Clean Sheets ===
Rank	Name	Total
1	(England) Joe White	5
2	(United States) Zach Bennett	4
3	(United States) Jimmy Hague	3
4	(United States) Wes Mink	2

== Historic Record vs Opponents ==
Opponent	Regular Season	Playoffs	U.S. Open Cup	Goals Scored	Goals conceded	Goal Differential	Total	Played	Win %
(Michigan) AFC Ann Arbor	1–3–0	*	*	4	5	−1	1–3–0	4	0.250
(Ohio) AFC Cleveland	0–1–1	*	*	2	7	−5	0–1–1	2	0.250
(Ohio) Cincinnati Saints	1–1–0	*	*	6	4	+2	1–1–0	2	0.500
(Ohio) Dayton Dynamo	2–0–0	*	*	4	0	+4	2–0–0	2	1.000
(Michigan) Detroit City FC	2–3–3	*	*	11	10	+1	2–3–3	8	0.437
(Pennsylvania) Erie Commodores FC	2–0–0	*	*	6	0	+6	2–0–0	2	1.000
(New York (state)) FC Buffalo	1–1–0	*	*	2	4	−2	1–1–0	2	0.500
FC Indiana	2–0–0	*	*	6	0	+6	2–0–0	2	1.000
(Pennsylvania) Fort Pitt FC Regiment	1–0–1	1–0	*	4	2	+2	2–0–1	3	0.833
(Michigan) Grand Rapids FC	1–2–1	*	*	6	8	−2	1–2–1	4	0.375
(Indiana) Indy Eleven NPSL	1–0–3	*	*	3	2	+1	1–0–3	4	0.625
(Michigan) Kalamazoo FC	1–2–1	*	*	2	7	−5	1–2–1	4	0.375
(Kentucky) Louisville City FC	*	*	0–1	0	1	−1	0–1–0	1	0.000
(Wisconsin) Madison 56ers	1–0–0	*	*	2	1	+1	1–0–0	1	1.000
Michigan Stars FC	5–3–1	*	*	16	9	+7	5–3–1	9	0.611
(Wisconsin) Milwaukee Torrent	1–1–0	*	*	4	3	+1	1–1–0	2	0.500
Minnesota Twin Stars	1–0–0	*	*	2	1	+1	1–0–0	1	1.000
Minnesota United FC Reserves	1–0–0	1–0	*	8	1	+7	2–0–0	2	1.000
(New Jersey) New York Red Bulls U-23	*	0–1	*	0	2	−2	0–1–0	1	0.000
(Illinois) RWB Adria	*	*	0	0	0	0	0–0–1 (4–2 PKs)	1	0.500
Total	26–18–11	2–1	0–1–1	88	67	+21	28–20–12	50	0.566

Legend
0-0-0	Win–loss-draw
0–0	Win–loss
*	No games played

- Does not include friendlies
- Updated to end of 2017 season

Notes

1. ^{A} formerly Erie Admirals S.C.
2. ^{B} formerly Indiana Fire NPSL
