= Lansing United Women =

Lansing United
- Full name: Lansing United
- Nicknames: LanU, The Hoops
- Founded: 2018; 7 years ago
- Ground: Archer Stadium; East Lansing, MI
- Capacity: 1,500
- Owner: Jeremy Sampson
- Head Coach: Jason Crist
- League: United Women's Soccer
- Website: http://www.lanunited.com/
Home colours	Away colours

Lansing United is an American amateur soccer club based in East Lansing, Michigan. The club began its inaugural season in United Women's Soccer in Spring 2018. United also fielded a men's team in the National Premier Soccer League and the Premier Development League from 2014 to 2018.

== History ==
=== Club Background ===
When Lansing United was accepted into the National Premier Soccer League in Fall of 2013, ideas for names were solicited from the Greater Lansing community, and Lansing United was chosen. The club motto is “Pride, Passion and Unity” and is reflected in the team's logo, with the star representing pride, the flame representing passion, and the gear representing unity. The club also uses the Latin phrase “Coniunctis Viribus” which means “With Connected Strength.” The club produced its first-ever NWSL draftee at the 2020 NWSL Draft in University of Virginia center back and East Lansing native Zoe Morse who was taken in the second round by the Chicago Red Stars.

=== Inaugural UWS Season (2018–present) ===
Beginning in May 2018, United will field a squad in the Midwest Division of United Women's Soccer.

== Stadium ==
Lansing United play their home matches at Archer Stadium located in the East Lansing Soccer Complex.

== Year-by-year ==
Year	League	Record	Regular season	Playoffs
2018	UWS	7–0–3	1st, Midwest	Conference Final
2019	UWS	8–1–1	1st, Midwest	Conference Semifinal

== Head coaches ==
- (United States) Jason Crist (2018–present)
