= Lewis Jones (footballer, born 1994) =

English footballer

Personal information
- Full name: Lewis Jones
- Date of birth: 21 June 1997 (age 29)
- Place of birth: Blackpool, England
- Position: Attacking midfielder

College career
Years	Team	Apps	(Gls)
2015	Andrew Fighting Tigers		
2016–2017	Spring Arbor Cougars	44	(17)

Senior career*
Years	Team	Apps	(Gls)
2015	Litherland REMYCA		
2017	Memphis City		
2018	Lansing United	10	(0)
2019	Lansing Ignite	1	(0)

International career^{‡}
2016–	British Virgin Islands	2	(0)
- * Club domestic league appearances and goals as of 14 October 2019 ‡ National team caps and goals as of 18 February 2018

Lewis Jones (born 25 December 1994) is a professional footballer who plays as an attacking midfielder. He is a British Virgin Islands international.

== Career ==
Jones had a spell playing for North West Counties Football League side Litherland REMYCA before going to study at Andrew College and Spring Arbor University in America. In his two seasons with Spring Arbor, he scored 17 goals and provided 17 assists.

Jones has also played for NPSL side Memphis City and PDL club Lansing United who he played ten regular season matches for in 2018.

Jones played for Lansing Ignite during their inaugural 2019 season. The club ceased operations following the conclusion of the season.

== International career ==
After a tip off from his Andrew College teammate Troy Caesar, Jones was called up to the British Virgin Islands national team for their 2017 Caribbean Cup qualification matches against Martinique and Dominica. Jones appeared in both matches.
