= List of NCAA Division I men's soccer teams ranked in the 2017 Top 25 coaches poll =

2017 NCAA Division I
men's soccer
Top 25 coaches poll
←2016 | 2018→

This is a week-by-week listing of the NCAA Division I teams ranked in the 2017 Top 25 coaches poll of the United Soccer Coaches (formerly the National Soccer Coaches Association of America [NSCAA]), the most widely recognized national collegiate soccer ranking system in the U.S. Several weeks prior to the season and each week during the playing season, the 205 Division I teams are voted on by a panel of 24 coaches from the division during a weekly conference call, with the rankings then announced early on Tuesday afternoon (Eastern Time). The poll has no bearing on the selections for the 2017 NCAA Division I Men's Soccer Championship, and the coaches association states: "The NSCAA College Rankings are an indicator of week-to-week status of qualified programs and in no way should be used as a guide or indicator of eligibility for championship selection."

First place votes received in parentheses; rv = received votes. Source =

School	Preseason August 3.	Week 1 August 29	Week 2 September 5	Week 3 September 12	Week 4 September 19	Week 5 September 26	Week 6 October 3	Week 7 October 10	Week 8 October 17	Week 9 October 24	Week 10 October 31	Week 11 November 7	Week 12 November 14	Final Poll December 12
Stanford	1	1 (23)	1 (23)	5 (1)	5	11	8	8	6	5	4	3	3 (2)	1 (23)
Indiana	7	7	4	1 (17)	2 (7)	1 (20)	1 (22)	1 (22)	1 (19)	2 (10)	2 (7)	2 (5)	2 (2)	2
Akron	16	24	rv	rv	—	rv	rv	rv	19	14	10	7	4	3
North Carolina	4	3	10	8	7	5	4 (1)	4	4 (1)	3	3 (1)	6	7	4 (1)
Wake Forest	2	2	2 (1)	4 (2)	4	2 (2)	2	2 (1)	2 (3)	1 (14)	1 (16)	1 (18)	1 (20)	5
Michigan State	22	13	13	6	6	4 (2)	6	6 (1)	9	7	8	14	15	6
Louisville	9	11	8	17	10	8	7	5	5	11	6	9	9	7
SMU	—	rv	rv	rv	19	rv	25	17	14	12	13	11	10	8
Western Michigan	—	rv	—	24	12	9	12	13	8	6	5	4	6	9
Wisconsin	—	rv	—	—	rv	—	—	—	rv	—	—	rv	20	10
Fordham	—	—	—	—	—	—	—	—	—	—	—	rv	—	11
Butler	25	17	21	rv	rv	22	15	20	rv	21	15	15	19	12
Duke	—	rv	rv	23	rv	19	19	16	15	18	11	16	14	13
New Hampshire	—	rv	24	16	14	12	21	23	18	17	20	21	rv	14
Coastal Carolina	19	rv	—	—	—	—	—	—	—	rv	rv	rv	rv	15
Georgetown	—	rv	18	9	16	14	10	9	13	10	18	18	11	16
Clemson	5	5	3	10 t	8	6	5	11	7	4	9	5 (1)	5	17
Notre Dame	10	9	6	2 (2)	1 (13)	7	9	7	12	16	21	13	12	18
Virginia	13	12	11	12	9	10	11	10	10	13	16	17	8	19
FIU	—	rv	rv	rv	rv	rv	17	14	11	8	7	8	13	20
Colgate	—	—	—	—	—	—	—	—	—	—	—	—	—	21
Michigan	—	rv	rv	18	22	20	rv	24	23	19	12	10	16	22
Dartmouth	—	rv	—	—	—	rv	rv	rv	20	20	19	19	17	23
Seattle	—	25	—	rv	24	rv	23	rv	25	22	23	23	23	24
Columbia	—	—	—	—	—	23	14	22	rv	rv	rv	25	rv	25
Old Dominion	—	20	—	—	—	—	rv	18	—	rv	—	—	25	rv
Air Force	—	rv	—	rv	20	18	13	12	16	15	14	12	18	rv
Pacific	—	—	23	14	17	rv	18	rv	rv	rv	rv	rv	rv	rv
VCU	—	—	—	—	—	—	—	rv	rv	rv	22	24	22	rv
Massachusetts	—	—	—	—	—	—	—	rv	rv	25	25	rv	24	rv
California	—	rv	—	—	—	—	24	rv	17	25	rv	22	21	rv
Virginia Tech	17	rv	rv	rv	—	rv	rv	rv	rv	—	—	—	—	rv
UNC Wilmington	—	rv	15	22	18	15	16	15	rv	—	—	—	—	rv
Washington	11	10	16	rv	—	17	22	19	21	23	17	20	rv	—
Maryland	6	6	5	3 (2)	3 (4)	3	3 (1)	3	3 (1)	9	24	rv	rv	—
Rider	—	—	—	—	—	rv	rv	25	22	rv	rv	rv	—	—
Kentucky	—	rv	19	13	15	13	20	21	—	—	rv	—	—	—
Creighton	14	23	rv	rv	—	25	rv	—	rv	rv	—	—	—	—
New Mexico	20	rv	rv	—	—	rv	rv	rv	24	rv	—	—	—	—
UMass Lowell	18	14	12	25	rv	rv	—	—	—	rv	—	—	—	—
Connecticut	24	rv	—	—	—	—	—	—	rv	—	—	—	—	—
Ohio State	—	—	—	rv	25	16	rv	rv	rv	—	—	—	—	—
Syracuse	8	8	7	7	11	21	rv	—	—	—	—	—	—	—
Omaha	—	21	17	10t	23	24	rv	—	—	—	—	—	—	—
Fairleigh Dickinson	—	—	rv	21	21	—	rv	—	—	—	—	—	—	—
Gonzaga	—	—	22	—	—	—	rv	—	—	—	—	—	—	—
West Virginia	—	19	14	rv	rv	rv	—	—	—	—	—	—	—	—
Furman	—	—	20	15	13	rv	—	—	—	—	—	—	—	—
Charlotte	15	16	rv	rv	rv	rv	—	—	—	—	—	—	—	—
Denver	3	4 (1)	9	rv	rv	—	—	—	—	—	—	—	—	—
Bowling Green	—	rv	rv	19	—	–	—	—	—	—	—	—	—	—
Tulsa	—	—	—	20	—	—	—	—	—	—	—	—	—	—
Utah Valley	—	18	rv	rv	—	—	—	—	—	—	—	—	—	—
UCLA	21	15	25	—	—	—	—	—	—	—	—	—	—	—
Providence	12	rv	rv	—	—	—	—	—	—	—	—	—	—	—
Boston College	—	22	—	—	—	—	—	—	—	—	—	—	—	—
Florida Gulf Coast	23	—	—	—	—	—	—	—	—	—	—	—	—	—

== See also ==
- 2017 NCAA Division I men's soccer season
- 2017 NCAA Division I Men's Soccer Championship
