= 2017 Atlantic Coast Conference men's soccer season =

- League: NCAA Division I
- Sport: Soccer
- Duration: August 25, 2017 – November 12, 2017
- Teams: 12

2018 MLS SuperDraft
- Top draft pick: Jon Bakero, Wake Forest
- Picked by: Chicago Fire, 5th overall

Regular season
- Season champions: Atlantic: Wake Forest; Coastal: North Carolina
- Runners-up: Atlantic: Louisville; Coastal: Duke
- Season MVP: Offensive: Jon Bakero; Midfielder: Cam Lindley; Defensive: Kevin Politz

ACC tournament
- Champions: Wake Forest
- Runners-up: Virginia
- Finals MVP: (Spain) Andreu Cases Mundet

ACC men's soccer seasons
- ← 2016 2018 →

2017 ACC men's soccer standings
	Conf.					Overall
Team	W		L		T	W		L		T
Atlantic
No. 5 Wake Forest ‡	7	–	0	–	1	19	–	2	–	2
No. 7 Louisville +	5	–	2	–	1	13	–	2	–	5
No. 17 Clemson +	4	–	4	–	0	12	–	6	–	1
NC State +	3	–	3	–	2	8	–	6	–	4
Boston College	1	–	6	–	1	6	–	10	–	1
Syracuse	0	–	6	–	2	6	–	8	–	4
Coastal
No. 4 North Carolina +	6	–	1	–	1	17	–	4	–	1
No. 13 Duke +	4	–	3	–	1	13	–	4	–	3
No. 19 Virginia +	3	–	2	–	3	13	–	4	–	5
No. 18 Notre Dame +	3	–	3	–	2	11	–	7	–	2
Virginia Tech +	3	–	5	–	0	10	–	10	–	0
Pittsburgh	2	–	6	–	0	8	–	10	–	0
‡ – 2017 ACC Tournament champion + – Invited to the 2017 NCAA Division I Men's Soccer Championship; As of December 13, 2017; Rankings from United Soccer Coaches

The 2017 Atlantic Coast Conference men's soccer season was the 64th season of men's varsity soccer in the conference.

The Wake Forest Demon Deacons and the North Carolina are the defending regular season champions for the Atlantic and Coastal Conferences, respectively. Wake Forest are the defending ACC tournament champions.

== Changes from 2016 ==
George Kiefer replaces Kelly Findley as the NC State Wolfpack head coach.

== Teams ==
=== Stadiums and locations ===
Atlantic Division
Team	Stadium	Capacity
Boston College Eagles	Newton Soccer Complex	2,500
Clemson Tigers	Riggs Field	6,500
Louisville Cardinals	Lynn Stadium	5,300
NC State Wolfpack	Dail Soccer Field	3,000
Syracuse Orange	SU Soccer Stadium	5,000
Wake Forest Demon Deacons	Spry Stadium	3,000

Coastal Division
Team	Stadium	Capacity
Duke Blue Devils	Koskinen Stadium	7,000
North Carolina Tar Heels	Fetzer Field	5,025
Notre Dame Fighting Irish	Alumni Stadium	2,500
Pittsburgh Panthers	Ambrose Urbanic Field	735
Virginia Cavaliers	Klöckner Stadium	8,000
Virginia Tech Hokies	Thompson Field	2,500

1. Florida State, Georgia Tech and Miami do not sponsor men's soccer

=== Personnel ===
Team	Head coach	Captain
Boston College Eagles	(Republic of Ireland) Ed Kelly	(United States) Henry Balf
Clemson Tigers	(United States) Mike Noonan	(United States) Tanner Dieterich (England) Oliver Shannon
Duke Blue Devils	(United States) John Kerr, Jr.	(Canada) Kevon Black (United States) Cody Brinkman (Norway) Markus Fjørtoft (United States) Carter Manley (United States) Brian White
Louisville Cardinals	(United States) Ken Lolla	(Germany) Tim Kübel
NC State Wolfpack	(United States) George Kiefer	(Germany) Julius Duchscherer
North Carolina Tar Heels	(Guatemala) Carlos Somoano	(England) David October
Notre Dame Fighting Irish	(Scotland) Bobby Clark	(United States) Matt Habrowski (United States) Chris Hubbard (United States) Jon Gallagher
Pittsburgh Panthers	(United States) Jay Vidovich	(United States) Bryce Cregan (Spain) Javi Pérez
Syracuse Orange	(England) Ian McIntyre	
Virginia Cavaiers	(United States) George Gelnovatch	
Virginia Tech Hokies	(United States) Mike Brizendine	(United States) Ben Lundgaard (United States) Collin Verfurth (Costa Rica) Marcelo Acuna
Wake Forest Demon Deacons	(United States) Bobby Muuss	(United States) Kevin Politz (Spain) Jon Bakero (United States) Steven Echevarria

== Preseason ==
=== Hermann Trophy ===
Prior to the season, 7 players were named to the Hermann Trophy watch list.

- Tim Kübel – Louisville
- Cam Lindley – North Carolina
- Jon Gallagher – Notre Dame
- Mo Adams – Syracuse
- Edward Opoku – Virginia
- Marcelo Acuna – Virginia Tech
- Brad Dunwell – Wake Forest

==== Preseason poll ====
The 2017 ACC preseason poll was announced on August 16. Wake Forest and North Carolina were selected to win the Atlantic Division and Coastal Division, respectively. North Carolina was selected as the favorite to win the ACC championship. The poll was voted on by all ACC coaches, for a total of 12 possible votes.

ACC championship votes

1. North Carolina – 5
2. Wake Forest – 3
3. Clemson – 2
4. Virginia – 1
5. Notre Dame – 1

==== Regular season poll ====
Atlantic Division poll
1. Wake Forest – 62 (8 first-place votes)
2. Clemson – 60 (3)
3. Louisville – 52 (1)
4. Syracuse – 41
5. Boston College – 20
6. NC State – 17
Coastal Division poll
1. North Carolina – 69 (9)
2. Virginia – 58 (2)
3. Notre Dame – 51 (1)
4. Virginia Tech – 31
5. Duke – 28
6. Pittsburgh – 15

== Regular season ==
Index to colors and formatting
ACC member won
ACC member lost
ACC member tied
ACC teams in **bold**

All times Eastern time.

=== Week 1 (Aug 21–27) ===
Schedule and results:

Date	Time (ET)	Visiting team	Home team	Site	TV	Result	Attendance
August 25	4:00 PM	Quinnipiac	**Boston College**	Newton Soccer Complex	N/A	**W** 4–0	462
August 25	5:00 PM	Cal State Fullerton	**#5 Clemson**	Riggs Field	N/A	**W** 2–0	2,538
August 25	7:00 PM	**#17 Virginia Tech**	#14 Creighton	Sandra D. Thompson Field	N/A	**W** 2–0	4,089
August 25	7:00 PM	Florida Atlantic	**NC State**	Dail Soccer Field	N/A	**W** 3–2	1,543
August 25	7:00 PM	**Pittsburgh**	Ohio State	Jesse Owens Memorial Stadium	N/A	**L** 0–1	1,400
August 25	7:30 PM	#12 Providence	**#4 North Carolina**	Rudd Field	ACC Network Extra	**W** 4–2	826
August 25	7:00 PM	**#8 Syracuse**	Saint Louis	Hermann Stadium	N/A	**W** 2–1 (OT)	2,348
August 25	7:00 PM	Villanova	**#13 Virginia**	Klöckner Stadium	N/A	**W** 3–2 (2OT)	3,594
August 25	7:30 PM	Rutgers Scarlet Knights	**#2 Wake Forest**	Spry Stadium	ACC Network Extra	**W** 5–1	3,882
August 25	7:30 PM	San Diego	**#10 Notre Dame**	Alumni Stadium	ACC Network Extra	**W** 2–0	746
August 25	7:30 PM	UCF	**Duke**	Koskinen Stadium	ACC Network Extra	**W** 2–0	1,725
August 25	7:30 PM	UC Irvine	**#9 Louisville**	Lynn Stadium	ACC Network Extra	**W** 2–1	2,078
August 27	2:00 PM	Cal Poly	**#10 Notre Dame**	Alumni Stadium	ACC Network Extra	**W** 2-1 (2OT)	
August 27	2:30 PM	Fordham	**Duke**	Koskinen Stadium	ACC Network Extra	**W** 3–0	582
August 27	4:00 PM	**Pittsburgh**	James Madison	Jesse Owens Memorial Stadium	N/A	**L** 0–1	200
August 27	6:00 PM	#12 Providence	**#2 Wake Forest**	Spry Stadium	ACC Network Extra	**W** 4–1	2,597
August 27	6:00 PM	Radford	**#5 Clemson**	Riggs Field	ACC Network Extra	**W** 2–1	1,231
August 27	6:00 PM	**#17 Virginia Tech**	Omaha	Al F. Caniglia Field	N/A	**L** 1–5	624
August 27	7:00 PM	Boston	**Boston College**	Newton Soccer Complex	N/A	**W** 4–0	453
August 27	7:00 PM	**#8 Syracuse**	SIU Edwardsville	Ralph Korte Stadium	N/A	**W** 2–1	337
August 27	7:30 PM	Rutgers	**#4 North Carolina**	WakeMed Soccer Park	ACC Network Extra	**W** 6–1	926

Players of the week:

Offensive		Defensive	
Player	Team	Player	Team
Jelani Pieters	North Carolina	Younes Boudadi	Boston College
Brandon Servania	Wake Forest	Younes Boudadi	Boston College
Reference: ACC

=== Week 2 (Aug 28 – Sep 3) ===
Schedule and results:

Date	Time (ET)	Visiting team	Home team	Site	TV	Result	Attendance
August 28	7:00 PM	William & Mary	**NC State**	Dail Soccer Field	N/A	**W** 3–2 (OT)	419
August 28	7:30 PM	#25 Butler	**#9 Louisville**	Lynn Stadium	ACC Network Extra	**L** 0–1	1,457
August 31	6:00 PM	Hofstra	**#12 Virginia**	Klöckner Stadium	ACC Network Extra	**W** 4–0	1,588
September 1	2:00 PM	High Point	**Duke**	Koskinen Stadium	ACC Network Extra	**W** 3–2 (OT)	405
September 1	3:00 PM	Princeton	**#8 Syracuse**	SU Soccer Stadium	N/A	**T** 1–1	1,232
September 1	4:00 PM	LIU Brooklyn	**NC State**	Dail Soccer Field	N/A	Cancelled	0
September 1	4:00 PM	New Hampshire	**#22 Boston College**	Newton Soccer Complex	N/A	**L** 0–2	485
September 1	7:00 PM	Longwood	**Pittsburgh**	Ambrose Urbanic Field	ACC Network Extra	**W** 2–0	747
September 1	7:00 PM	**#11 Louisville**	Georgia State	GSU Soccer Field	N/A	**W** 1–0	100
September 1	7:00 PM	**#3 North Carolina**	UNC Wilmington	UNC Wilmington Soccer Stadium	N/A	**L** 0–1	1,778
September 1	7:00 PM	Pacific	**Virginia Tech**	James Madison Soccer Complex	N/A	**W** 1–0	85
September 1	7:00 PM	South Carolina	**#5 Clemson**	Riggs Field	N/A	**W** 4–1	5,610
September 2	7:00 PM	**#9 Notre Dame**	Connecticut	Morrone Stadium	N/A	**W** 1–0	4,522
September 2	8:00 PM	**#2 Wake Forest**	Saint Louis	Hermann Stadium	N/A	**W** 4–1	919
September 3	12:00 noon	Binghamton	**Virginia Tech**	James Madison Soccer Complex	N/A	**W** 2–0	100
September 3	7:00 PM	Northwestern	**#8 Syracuse**	SU Soccer Stadium	ACC Network Extra	**W** 3–1	1,010

Players of the week:

Offensive		Defensive	
Player	Team	Player	Team
Tim Kübel	Louisville	Patrick Bunk-Andersen	Clemson
Reference: ACC

=== Week 3 (Sep 4–10) ===
Schedule and results:

Date	Time (ET)	Visiting team	Home team	Site	TV	Result	Attendance
September 4	1:00 PM	Xavier	**#22 Boston College**	Newton Soccer Complex	ACC Network Extra	**L** 2–3 (OT)	510
September 4	7:00 PM	**#5 Clemson**	Georgia Southern	Eagle Field – Erk Park	N/A	**W** 2–1 (OT)	1,237
September 4	7:00 PM	Georgia State	**#2 Wake Forest**	Spry Stadium	N/A	**L** 2–1 (OT)	1,066
September 4	7:00 PM	**#3 North Carolina**	UNC Greensboro	UNCG Soccer Stadium	N/A	**W** 2–1	3,072
September 4	7:00 PM	**Pittsburgh**	Loyola, MD	Ridley Athletic Complex	N/A	**W** 1–0	1,307
September 4	7:00 PM	UNC Wilmington	**#12 Virginia**	Klöckner Stadium	N/A	**W** 2–1 (OT)	1,651
September 5	7:00 PM	#19 Kentucky	**#8 Louisville**	Lynn Stadium	ACC Network Extra	**T** 2–2 (2OT)	2,954
September 5	7:00 PM	Presbyterian	**Duke**	Koskinen Stadium	N/A	**T** 1–1 (2OT)	345
September 8	5:00 PM	**#6 Notre Dame**	**Boston College**	Newton Soccer Complex	ACC Network Extra	**ND** 3–1	846
September 8	7:00 PM	**#3 Clemson**	**NC State**	Dail Soccer Field	ACC Network Extra	**NCST** 1–0	1,589
September 8	7:00 PM	**#7 Syracuse**	**#11 Virginia**	Klöckner Stadium	ACC Network Extra	**T** 1–1 (2OT)	2,596
September 8	7:00 PM	**Virginia Tech**	**Duke**	Koskinen Stadium	ACC Network Extra	**DUKE** 3–1	825
September 9	7:00 PM	**#10 North Carolina**	**Pittsburgh**	Ambrose Urbanic Field	ACC Network Extra	**UNC** 2–1	571
September 9	7:30 PM	**#2 Wake Forest**	**#8 Louisville**	Lynn Stadium	ACC Network Extra	**WAKE** 3–1	2,708
September 10	7:00 PM	Longwood	**NC State**	Dail Soccer Field	ACC Network Extra	**W** 2–1	342

Players of the week:

Offensive		Defensive	
Player	Team	Player	Team
Jon Gallagher	Notre Dame	Leon Krapf	NC State
Reference: ACC

=== Week 4 (Sep 11–17) ===
Schedule and results:

Date	Time (ET)	Visiting team	Home team	Site	TV	Result	Attendance
September 12	7:00 PM	Appalachian State	#4 Wake Forest	Spry Stadium	N/A	**W** 3–0	1,132
September 12	7:00 PM	Marquette	#11 Virginia	Klöckner Stadium	ACC Network Extra	**W** 2–0	1,209
September 12	7:00 PM	Oregon State	#7 Syracuse	SU Soccer Stadium	ACC Network Extra	**W** 3–2	1,422
September 13	7:00 PM	William & Mary	#8 North Carolina	WakeMed Soccer Park	ACC Network Extra	**W** 3–2	616
September 15	7:00 PM	**Boston College**	#10 Clemson	Riggs Field	ACC Network Extra	**CLEM** 1–0	1,901
September 15	7:00 PM	**#17 Louisville**	#7 Syracuse	SU Soccer Stadium	ACC Network Extra	**LOU** 2–1	2,006
September 15	7:00 PM	**#12 Virginia**	Virginia Tech	Sandra D. Thompson Field	ACC Network Extra	**UVA** 2–1	2,143
September 15	7:30 PM	**NC State**	#2 Notre Dame	Alumni Stadium	ACC Network Extra	**ND** 3–0	1,221
September 16	7:00 PM	**#8 North Carolina**	#23 Duke	Bryan Park	ACC Network Extra	**UNC** 2–1	3,002
September 16	7:30 PM	**Pittsburgh**	#4 Wake Forest	Spry Stadium	ACC Network Extra	**WAKE** 2–0	3,207

Players of the week:

Offensive		Defensive	
Player	Team	Player	Team
Edward Opoku	Virginia	Felicien Dumas	Notre Dame
Reference: ACC

=== Week 5 (Sep 18–24) ===
Schedule and results:

Date	Time (ET)	Visiting team	Home team	Site	TV	Result	Attendance
September 19	6:00 PM	Providence	**Boston College**	Newton Soccer Complex	N/A	**W** 2–1 (2OT)	138
September 19	7:00 PM	Bowling Green	**#1 Notre Dame**	Alumni Stadium	ACC Network Extra	**W** 2–1	678
September 19	7:00 PM	Cornell	**#11 Syracuse**	SU Soccer Stadium	ACC Network Extra	**L** 0–1 (OT)	921
September 19	7:00 PM	Davidson	**Virginia Tech**	Sandra D. Thompson Field	ACC Network Extra	**W** 2–1	412
September 19	7:00 PM	George Washington	**#7 North Carolina**	WakeMed Soccer Park	ACC Network Extra	**W** 4–1	418
September 19	7:00 PM	High Point	**#4 Wake Forest**	Spry Stadium	N/A	**W** 1–0 (2OT)	1,180
September 19	7:00 PM	IUPUI	**#10 Louisville**	Lynn Stadium	ACC Network Extra	**W** 3–0	1,274
September 19	7:00 PM	**NC State**	Elon	Rudd Field	N/A	**T** 0–0 (2OT)	837
September 19	7:00 PM	Robert Morris	**Pittsburgh**	Ambrose Urbanic Field	ACC Network Extra	**W** 2–1	431
September 19	7:00 PM	UCLA	**#8 Clemson**	Riggs Field	N/A	**W** 3–0	2,147
September 19	7:00 PM	Wisconsin	**Duke**	Koskinen Stadium	ACC Network Extra	**W** 4–3	471
September 22	7:00 PM	**Boston College**	**#10 Louisville**	Lynn Stadium	ACC Network Extra	**LOU** 4–0	1,947
September 22	7:00 PM	**Duke**	**#11 Syracuse**	SU Soccer Stadium	ACC Network Extra	**DUKE** 2–1	2,022
September 22	7:00 PM	**#7 North Carolina**	**#9 Virginia**	Klöckner Stadium	ACC Network Extra	**UNC** 2–1 (OT)	4,205
September 22	7:00 PM	**#1 Notre Dame**	**Virginia Tech**	Thompson Field	ACC Network Extra	**VT** 2–1	1,526
September 22	7:00 PM	**Pittsburgh**	**#8 Clemson**	Riggs Field	ACC Network Extra	**CLEM** 3–0	3,831
September 23	7:00 PM	**#4 Wake Forest**	**NC State**	Dail Soccer Field	ACC Network Extra	**WAKE** 3–0	1,539

Players of the week:

Offensive		Defensive	
Player	Team	Player	Team
Marcelo Acuna	Virginia Tech	Ximo Miralles	Clemson
Reference: ACC

=== Week 6 (Sep 25 – Oct 1) ===
Schedule and results:

Date	Time (ET)	Visiting team	Home team	Site	TV	Result	Attendance
September 25	7:00 PM	Davidson	**#9 Virginia**	Klöckner Stadium	ACC Network Extra	**W** 2–1	1,056
September 25	7:00 PM	**Syracuse**	Colgate	Beyer-Small '76 Field	Patriot League Network	**W** 2–0	315
September 26	5:00 PM	Rhode Island	**Boston College**	Newton Soccer Complex	N/A	**L** 1–2	372
September 26	7:00 PM	Appalachian State	**#19 Duke**	Koskinen Stadium	ACC Network Extra	**W** 1–0	522
September 26	7:00 PM	Charlotte	**#6 Clemson**	Riggs Field	ACC Network Extra	**W** 4–1	1,308
September 26	7:00 PM	Longwood	**Virginia Tech**	Sandra D. Thompson Field	N/A	**W** 2–0	327
September 26	7:00 PM	**#7 Notre Dame**	#1 Indiana	Armstrong Stadium	Big Ten Network	**L** 0–1	4,654
September 26	7:00 PM	South Carolina	**#2 Wake Forest**	Spry Stadium	ACC Network Extra	**W** 2–1	1,050
September 26	7:00 PM	South Florida	**#8 Louisville**	Lynn Stadium	ACC Network Extra	**T** 1–1 (2OT)	1,567
September 26	7:00 PM	UNC Asheville	**NC State**	Dail Soccer Field	ACC Network Extra	**W** 3–0	693
September 26	7:00 PM	West Virginia	**Pittsburgh**	Ambrose Urbanic Field	ACC Network Extra	**W** 7–0	456
September 26	7:00 PM	Winthrop	**#5 North Carolina**	UNCG Soccer Stadium	ACC Network Extra	**W** 4–0	226
September 29	5:00 PM	**Virginia Tech**	**Boston College**	Newton Soccer Complex	ACC Network Extra	**VT** 1–0	308
September 29	7:00 PM	**#6 Clemson**	**#2 Wake Forest**	Spry Stadium	ESPNU	**WAKE** 3–2 (2OT)	4,781
September 29	7:00 PM	**NC State**	**#5 North Carolina**	WakeMed Soccer Park	ACC Network Extra	**UNC** 1–0	3,206
September 29	7:00 PM	**#21 Syracuse**	**Pittsburgh**	Ambrose Urbanic Field	ACC Network Extra	**PITT** 2–1	489
September 29	7:00 PM	**#10 Virginia**	**#7 Notre Dame**	Alumni Stadium	ACC Network Extra	**T** 1–1 (2OT)	2,158
September 30	7:00 PM	**#8 Louisville**	**#19 Duke**	Koskinen Stadium	ACC Network Extra	**LOU** 1–0	1,103

Players of the week:

Offensive		Defensive	
Player	Team	Player	Team
Ema Twumasi	Wake Forest	Bryce Cregan	Pittsburgh
Reference: ACC

=== Week 7 (Oct 2–8) ===
Schedule and results:

Date	Time (ET)	Visiting team	Home team	Site	TV	Result	Attendance
October 2	7:00 PM	Portland	**#10 Virginia**	Klöckner Stadium	ACC Network Extra	**W** 2–1 (OT)	1,319
October 3	7:00 PM	Akron	**Syracuse**	SU Soccer Stadium	ACC Network Extra	**L** 0–1	1,172
October 3	7:00 PM	Belmont	**NC State**	Dail Soccer Field	ACC Network Extra	**W** 3–0	703
October 3	7:00 PM	Elon	**#19 Duke**	Koskinen Stadium	ACC Network Extra	**W** 1–0	543
October 3	7:00 PM	James Madison	**#3 North Carolina**	WakeMed Soccer Park	ACC Network Extra	**W** 6–0	438
October 3	7:00 PM	Northwestern	**#9 Notre Dame**	Alumni Stadium	ACC Network Extra	**W** 2–1 (OT)	565
October 3	7:00 PM	**Pittsburgh**	#14 Columbia	Rocco B. Commiso Soccer Stadium	N/A	**W** 1–0	157
October 3	7:00 PM	**Virginia Tech**	South Carolina	Stone Stadium	N/A	**W** 3–2	3,972
October 6	5:00 PM	**Boston College**	**#11 Virginia**	Klöckner Stadium	ACC Network Extra	**UVA** 1–0	1,781
October 6	7:00 PM	**#19 Duke**	**Pittsburgh**	Ambrose Urbanic Field	ACC Network Extra	**DUKE** 2–0	623
October 6	7:00 PM	**#7 Louisville**	**Virginia Tech**	Sandra D. Thompson Field	ACC Network Extra	**LOU** 1–0	573
October 6	7:00 PM	**NC State**	**Syracuse**	SU Soccer Stadium	ACC Network Extra	**NCST** 2–1	1,211
October 6	7:00 PM	**#9 Notre Dame**	**#5 Clemson**	Riggs Field	ACC Network Extra	**ND** 2–1	4,035
October 6	7:00 PM	**#2 Wake Forest**	**#4 North Carolina**	WakeMed Soccer Park	ACC Network Extra	**WAKE** 2–1	2,006

Players of the week:

Offensive		Defensive	
Player	Team	Player	Team
Jon Gallagher	Notre Dame	Sergi Nus	Virginia
Reference: ACC

=== Week 8 (Oct 9–15) ===
Schedule and results:

Date	Time (ET)	Visiting team	Home team	Site	TV	Result	Attendance
October 9	1:00 PM	**#19 Duke**	#10 Georgetown	Shaw Field	Hoyas Live	**W** 2−1	497
October 10	4:00 PM	**Boston College**	Harvard	Jordan Field	NESN	**W** 3–1	167
October 10	7:00 PM	Florida Atlantic	**#5 Louisville**	Lynn Stadium	ACC Network Extra	**W** 5–0	918
October 10	7:00 PM	Gardner-Webb	**#11 Clemson**	Riggs Field	ACC Network Extra	**W** 5–0	1,059
October 10	7:00 PM	Lehigh	**#10 Virginia**	Klöckner Stadium	ACC Network Extra	**W** 4–2	1,265
October 10	7:00 PM	Longwood	**#2 Wake Forest**	Spry Stadium	N/A	**W** 8–0	1,127
October 10	7:00 PM	#24 Michigan	**#7 Notre Dame**	Alumni Stadium	ACC Network Extra	**W** 3–1	660
October 10	7:00 PM	Penn State	**Pittsburgh**	Ambrose Urbanic Field	ACC Network Extra	**W** 3–2	823
October 13	6:00 PM	**Syracuse**	**Boston College**	Newton Soccer Complex	ACC Network Extra	**BC** 2–1 (OT)	732
October 13	7:00 PM	**#11 Clemson**	**#16 Duke**	Koskinen Stadium	ACC Network Extra	**CLEM** 4–1	758
October 13	7:00 PM	**#4 North Carolina**	**#5 Louisville**	Lynn Stadium	ACC Network Extra	**T** 0–0 (2OT)	3,435
October 13	7:00 PM	**Pittsburgh**	**#7 Notre Dame**	Alumni Stadium	ACC Network Extra	**PITT** 1–0	825
October 13	7:00 PM	**#10 Virginia Cavaliers**	**NC State**	Dail Soccer Field	RSN	**T** 0–0 (2OT)	956
October 14	7:00 PM	**Virginia Tech**	**#2 Wake Forest**	Spry Stadium	ACC Network Extra	**WAKE** 3–0	3,846

Players of the week:

Offensive		Defensive	
Player	Team	Player	Team
Diego Campos	Clemson	Mauriq Hill	Pittsburgh
Reference: ACC

=== Week 9 (Oct 16–22) ===
Schedule and results:

Date	Time (ET)	Visiting team	Home team	Site	TV	Result	Attendance
October 17	6:00 PM	Connecticut	**Boston College**	Newton Soccer Complex	N/A	**W** 3–2 (OT)	139
October 17	7:00 PM	**#5 Louisville**	Charlotte	Transamerica Field	N/A	**W** 1–0 (OT)	1,027
October 17	7:00 PM	**#12 Notre Dame**	#19 Akron	FirstEnergy Stadium	ESPN3	**L** 0–2	1,905
October 17	7:00 PM	Old Dominion	**#4 North Carolina**	WakeMed Soccer Park	ACC Network Extra	**W** 2–1 (2OT)	200
October 17	7:00 PM	Radford	**#10 Virginia**	Klöckner Stadium	N/A	**L** 0–1	1,356
October 17	7:00 PM	UNC Wilmington	**NC State**	Dail Soccer Field	ACC Network Extra	**W** 2–1	534
October 17	7:00 PM	**#2 Wake Forest**	Elon	Rudd Field	N/A	**W** 2–0	731
October 18	7:00 PM	**Syracuse**	Ohio State	Jesse Owens Memorial Stadium	N/A	**W** 2–1	488
October 18	7:00 PM	**Virginia Tech**	William & Mary	Albert-Daly Field	N/A	**L** 1–4	515
October 20	7:00 PM	**#15 Duke**	**#12 Notre Dame**	Alumni Stadium	ACC Network Extra	**T** 0–0 (2OT)	1,703
October 20	7:00 PM	**Pittsburgh**	**#10 Virginia**	Klöckner Stadium	ACC Network Extra	**UVA** 2–1 (2OT)	3,450
October 21	7:00 PM	**#7 Clemson**	**Syracuse**	SU Soccer Stadium	ACC Network Extra	**CLEM** 2–1	1,672
October 21	7:00 PM	**NC State**	**#5 Louisville**	Lynn Stadium	ACC Network Extra	**NCST** 3–2	1,978
October 21	7:00 PM	**#2 Wake Forest**	**Boston College**	Newton Soccer Complex	ACC Network Extra	**WAKE** 4–0	791
October 22	2:30 PM	**#4 North Carolina**	**Virginia Tech**	Sandra D. Thompson Field	ACC Network Extra	**UNC** 4–0	850

Players of the week:

Offensive		Defensive	
Player	Team	Player	Team
Manny Perez	NC State	Will Pulisic	Duke
Reference: ACC

=== Week 10 (Oct 23–29) ===
Schedule and results:

Date	Time (ET)	Visiting team	Home team	Site	TV	Result	Attendance
October 24	7:00 PM	#14 Akron	Pittsburgh	Ambrose Urbanic Field	ACC Network Extra	**L** 0–3	707
October 24	7:00 PM	Delaware	#18 Duke	Koskinen Stadium	ACC Network Extra	**W** 2–1	331
October 27	7:00 PM	**Boston College**	NC State	Method Road	ACC Network Extra	**T** 0–0 (2OT)	609
October 27	7:00 PM	**#11 Louisville**	#4 Clemson	Riggs Field	ACC Network Extra	**LOU** 2–1	2,022
October 27	7:00 PM	**#16 Notre Dame**	#3 North Carolina	WakeMed Soccer Park	ACC Network Extra	**UNC** 3–0	1,226
October 27	7:00 PM	**Syracuse**	#1 Wake Forest	Spry Stadium	ACC Network Extra	**T** 0–0 (2OT)	4,357
October 27	7:00 PM	**#18 Virginia**	#13 Duke	Koskinen Stadium	ACC Network Extra	**DUKE** 1–0	905
October 27	7:00 PM	**Virginia Tech**	Pittsburgh	Ambrose Urbanic Field	ACC Network Extra	**VT** 3–0	905

Players of the week:

Offensive		Defensive	
Player	Team	Player	Team
Daniel Wright	Duke	Hendrik Hilpert	Syracuse
Reference: ACC

=== Week 11 (Oct 30 – Nov 5) ===
Schedule and results:
Note: Rankings shown are seedings from ACC tournament

Date	Time (ET)	Visiting team	Home team	Site	TV	Result	Attendance
November 1	7:00 PM	12 Syracuse	5 Clemson	Riggs Field, Clemson, SC	ACC Network Extra	**CLEM** 2–2 (4–3 PK)	1,348
November 1	7:00 PM	11 Boston College	6 Virginia	Klöckner Stadium, Charlottesville, VA	ACC Network Extra	**UVA** 4–0	536
November 1	7:00 PM	10 Pittsburgh	7 Notre Dame	Alumni Stadium, Notre Dame, IN	ACC Network Extra	**ND** 5–0	128
November 1	7:00 PM	9 Virginia Tech	8 NC State	Dail Soccer Field, Raleigh, NC	ACC Network Extra	**VT** 1–0 (OT)	800
November 5	1:00 PM	9 Virginia Tech	1 Wake Forest	Spry Stadium, Winston-Salem, NC	ACC Network Extra	**WAKE** 3–0	1,709
November 5	1:00 PM	7 Notre Dame	2 North Carolina	WakeMed Soccer Park, Cary, NC	ACC Network Extra	**ND** 2–1	395
November 5	1:00 PM	6 Virginia	3 Louisville	Lynn Stadium, Louisville, KY	ACC Network Extra	**UVA** 0–0 (4–3 PK)	738
November 5	1:00 PM	5 Clemson	4 Duke	Koskinen Stadium, Durham, NC	ACC Network Extra	**CLEM** 1–0	468

=== Week 12 (Nov 6 – Nov 12) ===
Schedule and results:
Note: Rankings shown are seedings from ACC tournament

Date	Time (ET)	Visiting team	Home team	Site	TV	Result	Attendance
November 8	7:00 PM	**5 Clemson**	**1 Wake Forest**	Spry Stadium, Winston-Salem, NC	ACC Network Extra	**WAKE** 2–1	1,872
November 8	7:00 PM	**7 Notre Dame**	**6 Virginia**	Klöckner Stadium, Charlottesville, VA	ACC Network Extra	**UVA** 2–1	1,142
November 12	12:00 PM	**6 Virginia**	**1 Wake Forest**	MUSC Health Stadium, Charleston, SC	ESPNU	**WAKE** 0–0 (4–3 PK)	1,174

== Rankings ==
=== United Soccer ===
Legend
Increase in ranking
Decrease in ranking
Not ranked previous week

	Pre Aug 3.	Wk 1 Aug. 29	Wk 2 Sept. 5	Wk 3 Sept. 12	Wk 4 Sept. 19	Wk 5 Sept. 26	Wk 6 Oct. 3	Wk 7 Oct. 10	Wk 8 Oct. 17	Wk 9 Oct. 24	Wk 10 Oct. 31	Wk 11 Nov. 7	Wk 12 Nov. 14	Final Dec. 12
Boston College		22	RV											
Clemson	5	5	3	10	8	6	5	11	7	4	9	5	5	17
Duke		RV	RV	23	RV	19	19	16	15	18	11	16	14	13
Louisville	9	11	8	17	10	8	7	5	5	11	6	9	9	7
North Carolina	4	3	10	8	7	5	4	4	4	3	3	6	7	4
NC State					RV	RV	RV	RV		RV		RV	RV	
Notre Dame	10	9	6	2	1	7	9	7	12	16	21	13	12	18
Pittsburgh									RV	RV				
Syracuse	8	8	7	7	11	21	RV							
Virginia	13	12	11	12	9	10	11	10	10	13	16	17	8	19
Virginia Tech	17	RV	RV	RV		RV	RV	RV	RV					RV
Wake Forest	2	2	2	4	4	2	2	2	2	1	1	1	1	5

=== Top Drawer Soccer ===
Legend
Increase in ranking
Decrease in ranking
Not ranked previous week

	Pre July 1	Wk 1 Aug. 25	Wk 2 Aug. 28	Wk 3 Sept. 4	Wk 4 Sept. 11	Wk 5 Sept. 18	Wk 6 Sept. 25	Wk 7 Oct. 2	Wk 8 Oct. 9	Wk 9 Oct. 16	Wk 10 Oct. 23	Wk 11 Oct. 30	Wk 12 Nov. 6	Wk 13 Nov. 13	Wk 14 Nov. 20	Wk 15 Nov. 27	Wk 16 Dec. 4	Final Dec. 11
Boston College			25															
Clemson	8	8	8	5	8	12	9	10	13	6	4	14	12	8	19	19	19	19
Duke			19	16	15	17	10	11	11	13	17	8	17	11	9	12	12	12
Louisville	12	12	11	7	13	9	7	6	6	7	15	13	13	9	11	6	6	6
North Carolina	4	4	4	14	16	13	5	3	4	4	3	3	8	6	5	4	4	4
NC State					RV													
Notre Dame	17	17	10	6	3	4	8	7	7	8	16	21	14	10	22	22	22	22
Pittsburgh																		
Syracuse	7	7	7	9	7	11	20											
Virginia	14	14	12	8	4	5	6	5	5	5	11	9	4	12	21	21	21	21
Virginia Tech	20	20					RV	RV				RV	RV	RV	RV	RV	RV	RV
Wake Forest	3	3	3	3	6	7	4	4	3	3	1	1	1	1	1	1	5	5

== Postseason ==
=== ACC tournament ===
Semifinals
1	Wake Forest	2
5	Clemson	1
6	Virginia	2
7	Notre Dame	1

Final
1	Wake Forest	0 (4)
6	Virginia	0 (3)

=== NCAA tournament ===
Nine teams from the Atlantic Coast Conference were selected to participate in the NCAA tournament. Nine teams tied the record for most number of teams from a single conference in the tournament. The record of nine was achieved in 2016, also by the ACC. For the second straight year, seven ACC teams were seeded and received a first round bye in the tournament. The ACC now holds the top three spots for most teams from a conference. The ACC had eight teams invited in 2005. This is the seventeenth consecutive year that at least five teams from the ACC have earned an NCAA bid. All rankings shown in the table below are tournament seeds.

Seed	School	1st round	2nd round	3rd round	Quarterfinals	Semifinals	Championship
1	Wake Forest	BYE	W 1–0 vs. Columbia – (Winston-Salem, NC)	W 2–0 vs. Butler – (Winston-Salem, NC)	L 0–2 vs. #9 Stanford – (Winston-Salem, NC)		
3	North Carolina	BYE	W 2–1 vs. UNC Wilmington – (Chapel Hill, NC)	W 2–0 vs. Southern Methodist – (Cary, NC)	W 2–1 vs. Fordham – (Chapel Hill, NC)	L 0–1 vs. #2 Indiana – (Chester, Pennsylvania)	
4	Louisville	BYE	W 3–2 vs. San Francisco – (Louisville, KY)	W 2–0 vs. Colgate – (Louisville, KY)	T 0–0 ^{L, 3–4 PK}vs. #5 Akron – (Louisville, KY)		
6	Duke	BYE	W 2–1 vs. FIU – (Durham, NC)	T 2–2 ^{L, 7–8 PK} vs. Fordham – (Durham, NC)			
8	Clemson	BYE	L 1–3 vs. Coastal Carolina – (Clemson, SC)				
11	Virginia	BYE	L 0–1 vs. Fordham – (Charlottesville, VA)				
12	Notre Dame	BYE	L 0–1 (OT) vs. Wisconsin – (Notre Dame, IN)				
None	Virginia Tech	W 2–0 vs. Air Force – (Blacksburg, VA)	L 0–3 vs. #7 Michigan State – (East Lansing, MI)				
None	NC State	L 0–2 vs. Old Dominion – (Norfolk, VA)					

== Awards ==
=== Postseason awards ===
==== All-ACC awards and teams ====
The ACC announced award winners on November 7, 2017. All awards were voted on by the league's head coaches.

2017 ACC Men's Soccer Individual Awards
Award	Recipient(s)
Coach of the Year	Bobby Muuss – Wake Forest
Offensive Player of the Year	Jon Bakero – Wake Forest
Midfielder of the Year	Cam Lindley – North Carolina
Defensive Player of the Year	Kevin Politz – Wake Forest
Freshman of the Year	Manny Perez – NC State

2017 ACC Men's Soccer All-Conference Teams
First Team	Second Team	Third Team	Rookie Team
Diego Campos, Sr., F, Clemson; Oliver Shannon, Sr., M, Clemson; Tim Kübel, Sr., D, Louisville; Cam Lindley, So., M, North Carolina; Alan Winn, Sr., F, North Carolina; Jon Gallagher, Sr., F, Notre Dame; Jean-Christophe Koffi, Jr., M, Virginia; Marcelo Acuna Sr., F, Virginia Tech; Ben Lundgaard, Sr., GK, Virginia Tech; Jon Bakero, Sr., F, Wake Forest; Ema Twumasi, So., M, Wake Forest	Brian White, Sr., F, Duke; Tate Schmitt, Jr., M, Louisville; Mohamed Thiaw, Sr., F, Louisville; Zach Wright, Sr., F, North Carolina; Manny Perez, Fr., M, NC State; Javi Pérez, Jr., M, Pitt; Mo Adams, So., M, Syracuse; Pablo Aguilar, Sr., F, Virginia; Jeff Caldwell, Sr., GK, Virginia; Edward Opoku, Jr., F, Virginia; Kevin Politz, Sr., D, Wake Forest	Markus Fjørtoft, Gr., D, Duke; Carter Manley, Sr., D, Duke; Will Pulisic, Fr., GK, Duke; Alex Comsia, Jr., D, North Carolina; Mauricio Pineda, So., M, North Carolina; Jeffrey Farina Sr., F, Notre Dame; Pol Planellas Sr., M, Pitt; Tajon Buchanan, Fr., F, Syracuse; Sergi Nus, Jr., D, Virginia; Luis Argudo, Sr., M, Wake Forest; Brad Dunwell, Jr., M, Wake Forest	Robbie Robinson, Fr., F, Clemson; Will Pulisic, Fr., GK, Duke; John Nelson, Fr., D, North Carolina; David Loera, Fr., M, NC State; Manny Perez, Fr., M, NC State; Alexander Dexter, Fr., F, Pitt; Edward Kizza, Fr., F, Pitt; Tajon Buchanan, Fr., F, Syracuse; Joe Bell, Fr., M, Virginia; Omir Fernandez, Fr., M, Wake Forest; Brandon Servania, Fr., M, Wake Forest

==== All-Americans ====
===== College Soccer News =====
Six ACC players were named All-Americans by CollegeSoccerNews.com

Position	1st Team		2nd Team		3rd Team	
Position	Player	School	Player	School	Player	School
FW	Jon Bakero; Jon Gallagher	Wake Forest; Notre Dame	Alan Winn	North Carolina	none	
MF	Cam Lindley	North Carolina	none		none	
DF	Tim Kübel	Louisville	Kevin Politz	Wake Forest	none	
GK	none		none		none	

===== Soccer America =====
Seven ACC players were named All-Americans by Soccer America on December 8 .

Position	1st Team		2nd Team		3rd Team	
Position	Player	School	Player	School	Player	School
FW	Jon Bakero	Wake Forest	Jon Gallagher; Alan Winn	Notre Dame; North Carolina	Brian White	Duke
MF	Cam Lindley	North Carolina	none		none	
DF	Tim Kübel	Louisville	none		Kevin Politz	Wake Forest
GK	none		none		none	

===== United Soccer Coaches =====
On December 7, 2017, United Soccer Coaches announced their All-America teams, broken into three starting XI's. Seven ACC players were named All-America by USC.

Position	1st Team		2nd Team		3rd Team	
Position	Player	School	Player	School	Player	School
FW	Jon Bakero	Wake Forest	Jon Gallagher; Alan Winn	Notre Dame; North Carolina	Brian White	Duke
MF	Cam Lindley	North Carolina	none		none	
DF	Tim Kübel	Louisville	none		Kevin Politz	Wake Forest
GK	none		none		none	

==== National awards ====
- Hermann Trophy: Jon Bakero
- Senior CLASS Award: Jon Bakero

== MLS SuperDraft ==
=== Total picks by school ===
Team	Round 1	Round 2	Round 3	Round 4	Total
Clemson	0	2	0	0	2
Duke	2	1	0	0	3
Louisville	0	2	0	0	2
North Carolina	0	1	0	0	1
NC State	0	0	1	0	1
Notre Dame	1	0	0	0	1
Pittsburgh	0	1	0	0	1
Syracuse	1	0	0	0	1
Virginia	1	1	2	0	4
Virginia Tech	1	0	0	0	1
Wake Forest	2	0	1	0	3

=== List of selections ===
Round	Pick #	MLS team	Player	Position	College	Other
1	5	Chicago Fire	(Spain) Jon Bakero	FW	Wake Forest	
1	10	Chicago Fire	(England) Mo Adams	MF	Syracuse	Generation adidas
1	11	FC Dallas	(Ghana) Ema Twumasi	MF	Wake Forest	Generation adidas
1	14	Atlanta United FC	(Republic of Ireland) Jon Gallagher	FW	Notre Dame	
1	16	New York Red Bulls	(United States) Brian White	MF	Duke	
1	19	New York City FC	(United States) Jeff Caldwell	GK	Virginia	
1	21	Columbus Crew	(United States) Ben Lundgaard	GK	Virginia Tech	
1	23	Minnesota United FC	(United States) Carter Manley	DF	Duke	
2	24	Los Angeles	(Spain) Pol Calvet	MF	Pittsburgh	
2	25	Colorado Rapids	(United States) Alan Winn	FW	North Carolina	
2	28	Toronto FC	(Germany) Tim Kübel	DF	Louisville	
2	32	Columbus Crew	(Ghana) Edward Opoku	FW	Virginia	Generation adidas
2	35	San Jose Earthquakes	(Senegal) Mohamed Thiaw	FW	Louisville	
2	36	Atlanta United FC	(England) Oliver Shannon	MF	Clemson	
2	38	Chicago Fire	(Costa Rica) Diego Campos	FW	Clemson	
2	45	Seattle Sounders FC	(Norway) Markus Fjørtoft	DF	Duke	
3	59	Houston Dynamo	(Guatemala) Pablo Aguilar	MF	Virginia	
3	61	Portland Timbers	(United States) Caleb Duvernay	DF	NC State	
3	66	Houston Dynamo	(United States) Sheldon Sullivan	DF	Virginia	
3	67	Columbus Crew	(United States) Luis Argudo	MF	Wake Forest	

=== Homegrown contracts ===
Original MLS team	Player	Position	College	Notes
New York Red Bulls	Kevin Politz	Defender	Wake Forest	2017 ACC Defender of the Year
FC Dallas	Brandon Servania	Midfielder	Wake Forest	2017 ACC Freshmen Best XI
