= 2017 Virginia Tech Hokies men's soccer team =

American college soccer season

2017 Virginia Tech Hokies men's soccer

NCAA Tournament, Second Round
- Conference: Atlantic Coast Conference
- Record: 10–10–0 (3–5–0 ACC)
- Head coach: Mike Brizendine (9th season)
- Assistant coaches: Jeff Kinney (3rd season); Patrick McSorley (8th season)
- Captains: Ben Lundgaard; Collin Verfurth; Marcelo Acuna
- Home stadium: Sandra D. Thompson Field

2017 ACC men's soccer standings
	Conf.					Overall
Team	W		L		T	W		L		T
Atlantic
No. 5 Wake Forest ‡	7	–	0	–	1	19	–	2	–	2
No. 7 Louisville +	5	–	2	–	1	13	–	2	–	5
No. 17 Clemson +	4	–	4	–	0	12	–	6	–	1
NC State +	3	–	3	–	2	8	–	6	–	4
Boston College	1	–	6	–	1	6	–	10	–	1
Syracuse	0	–	6	–	2	6	–	8	–	4
Coastal
No. 4 North Carolina +	6	–	1	–	1	17	–	4	–	1
No. 13 Duke +	4	–	3	–	1	13	–	4	–	3
No. 19 Virginia +	3	–	2	–	3	13	–	4	–	5
No. 18 Notre Dame +	3	–	3	–	2	11	–	7	–	2
Virginia Tech +	3	–	5	–	0	10	–	10	–	0
Pittsburgh	2	–	6	–	0	8	–	10	–	0
‡ – 2017 ACC Tournament champion + – Invited to the 2017 NCAA Division I Men's Soccer Championship; As of December 13, 2017; Rankings from United Soccer Coaches

The 2017 Virginia Tech Hokies men's soccer team represented Virginia Tech during the 2017 NCAA Division I men's soccer season. It was the 46th season of the university fielding a program. The Hokies played their home fixtures at Sandra D. Thompson Field in Blacksburg, Virginia. The Hokies were led by ninth year head coach Mike Brizendine.

== Roster ==
Updated: August 21, 2017

Note: Flags indicate national team as defined under FIFA eligibility rules; some limited exceptions apply. Players may hold more than one non-FIFA nationality.

No.	Pos.	Nation	Player
0	GK	(Germany) GER	Morten Lamps
1	GK	(United States) USA	Ben Lundgaard (captain)
2	DF	(United States) USA	Will Mejia
3	MF	(United States) USA	Collin Verfurth (captain)
5	DF	(Iceland) ISL	Jon Ingason
6	FW	(United States) USA	Brendan Moyers
8	FW	(United States) USA	James Kasak
9	FW	(Finland) FIN	Elias Tamburini
10	MF	(United States) USA	Robert McCoy
11	FW	(Costa Rica) CRC	Marcelo Acuna (captain)
15	MF	(United States) USA	Kristo Strickler
16	MF	(United States) USA	Rory Slevin
17	FW	(Germany) GER	Gregor von Westphalen
18	FW	(United States) USA	Drew Ott

No.	Pos.	Nation	Player
19	DF	(United States) USA	Matt Dudon
20	DF	(Brazil) BRA	Rodrigo Zampieri
21	MF	(United States) USA	Camron Lennon
22	FW	(United States) USA	Gino Rossi
23	MF	(United States) USA	Forrest White
24	MF	(Finland) FIN	Justus Kauppinen
25	GK	(United States) USA	Charles Filby
26	MF	(South Korea) KOR	Hyunsueng Hong
27	GK	(United States) USA	Hayden Kickbush
28	MF	(United States) USA	Daniel Damiani
29	FW	(United States) USA	Durke Bender
30	FW	(France) FRA	Gaetan Roux
31	FW	(Germany) GER	Jakob Bluemler
32	FW	(United States) USA	Nico Quashie

Prior to the season Virginia Tech named the three captains shown above.

== Coaching staff ==
Position	Staff
Athletic director	Whit Babcock
Head coach	Mike Brizendine
Assistant coach	Jeff Kinney
Assistant coach	Patrick McSorley
Goalkeeper coach	Ryan Hulings

== Schedule ==
Date Time, TV	Rank^{#}	Opponent^{#}	Result	Record	Site (Attendance) City, State
Exhibition
August 15*; 7:00 pm	No. 17	at East Tennessee State	W 1–0	– (–)	Summers-Taylor Stadium; Johnson City, TN
August 19; 7:00 pm	No. 17	No. 5 Clemson	T 4–4	– (–)	Sandra D. Thompson Field; Blacksburg, VA
Regular season
August 25*; 7:00 pm	No. 17	No. 14 Creighton	W 2–0	1–0–0 (0-0-0)	Morrison Stadium (4,089); Omaha, NE
August 27*; 6:00 pm	No. 17	Omaha	L 1–5	1–1–0 (0-0-0)	Al F. Caniglia Field (624); Omaha, NE
September 1*; 7:00 pm		vs. Pacific; JMU Invitational	L 0–1	1–2–0 (0-0-0)	James Madison Soccer Complex (85); Harrisonburg, VA
September 3*; 12:00 noon		vs. Binghamton; JMU Invitational	W 2–1	2–2–0 (0-0-0)	James Madison Soccer Complex (100); Harrisonburg, VA
September 8; 7:00 pm		at Duke	L 1–3	2–3–0 (0–1–0)	Koskinen Stadium (825); Durham, NC
September 15; 7:00 pm		No. 12 Virginia	L 1–2	2–4–0 (0–2–0)	Thompson Field (2,143); Blacksburg, VA
September 19*; 7:00 pm		Davidson	W 2–1	3–4–0 (0–2–0)	Thompson Field (412); Blacksburg, VA
September 22; 7:00 pm		No. 1 Notre Dame	W 2–1	4–4–0 (1–2–0)	Thompson Field (1,526); Blacksburg, VA
September 26*; 7:00 pm		Longwood	W 2–0	5–4–0 (1–2–0)	Thompson Field (327); Blacksburg, VA
September 29; 5:00 pm		at Boston College	W 1–0	6–4–0 (2–2–0)	Newton Soccer Complex (308); Chestnut Hill, MA
October 3*; 7:00 pm		at South Carolina	W 3–2	7–4–0 (2–2–0)	Stone Stadium (3,972); Columbia, SC
October 6; 7:00 pm		No. 7 Louisville	L 0–1	7–5–0 (2–3–0)	Thompson Field (573); Blacksburg, VA
October 14; 7:00 pm		at No. 2 Wake Forest	L 0–3	7–6–0 (2–4–0)	WakeMed Soccer Park (3,846); Winston-Salem, NC
October 18*; 7:00 pm		at William & Mary	L 1–4	7–7–0 (2–4–0)	Albert-Daly Field (515); Williamsburg, VA
October 22; 2:30 pm		No. 4 North Carolina; Senior Day	L 0–4	7–8–0 (2–5–0)	Thompson Field (850); Blacksburg, VA
October 27; 7:00 pm		at Pittsburgh	W 3–0	8–8–0 (3–5–0)	Ambrose Urbanic Field (905); Pittsburgh, PA
ACC Tournament
November 1; 7:00 pm		at NC State; First Round	W 1–0 ^{OT}	9–8–0 (3–5–0)	Dail Soccer Field (800); Raleigh, NC
November 5; 1:00 pm		at No. 1 Wake Forest; Quarterfinal	L 0–3	9–9–0 (3–5–0)	Spry Stadium (1,709); Winston-Salem, NC
NCAA Tournament
November 16; 7:00 pm		Air Force; First Round	W 2-0	10–9–0	Thompson Field (440); Blacksburg, VA
November 19; 1:00 pm		No. 15 Michigan State; Second Round	L 0-3	10–10–0	DeMartin Soccer Complex (572); East Lansing, MI
*Non-conference game. ^{#}Rankings from United Soccer Coaches. (#) Tournament seedings in parentheses.

== Awards and honors ==
Recipient	Award	Date	Ref.
Marcelo Acuna	ACC Offensive Player of the Week	September 25	
Marcelo Acuna	All ACC First Team	November 7	
Ben Lundgaard	All ACC First Team	November 7	

== Rankings ==
Ranking movement Legend: ██ Improvement in ranking. ██ Decrease in ranking. ██ Not ranked the previous week. RV=Others receiving votes.
Poll	Pre	Wk 1	Wk 2	Wk 3	Wk 4	Wk 5	Wk 6	Wk 7	Wk 8	Wk 9	Wk 10	Wk 11	Wk 12	Wk 13	Wk 14	Wk 15	Wk 16	Final
United Soccer	17	RV	RV	RV		RV	RV	RV	RV					None Released				RV
TopDrawer Soccer	20	20					RV	RV				RV	RV	RV	RV	RV	RV	RV

== MLS Draft ==
The following members of the 2017 Virginia Tech Hokies men's soccer team were selected in the 2018 MLS SuperDraft.

Player	Round	Pick	Position	MLS club	Ref.
Ben Lungaard	1	21	GK	Columbus Crew SC	

== See also ==
- Virginia Tech Hokies men's soccer
- 2017 Atlantic Coast Conference men's soccer season
- 2017 NCAA Division I men's soccer season
- 2017 ACC Men's Soccer Tournament
- 2017 NCAA Division I Men's Soccer Championship
