= 2017 Clemson Tigers men's soccer team =

American college soccer season

2017 Clemson Tigers men's soccer

NCAA Tournament, Second Round
- Conference: Atlantic Coast Conference
- U. Soc. Coaches poll: No. 17
- TopDrawerSoccer.com: No. 19
- Record: 12–6–1 (4–4–0 ACC)
- Head coach: Mike Noonan (8th season)
- Assistant coaches: Philip Jones (5th season); Camilo Rodriguez (2nd season)
- Captains: Tanner Dieterich; Oliver Shannon
- Home stadium: Riggs Field

2017 ACC men's soccer standings
	Conf.					Overall
Team	W		L		T	W		L		T
Atlantic
No. 5 Wake Forest ‡	7	–	0	–	1	19	–	2	–	2
No. 7 Louisville +	5	–	2	–	1	13	–	2	–	5
No. 17 Clemson +	4	–	4	–	0	12	–	6	–	1
NC State +	3	–	3	–	2	8	–	6	–	4
Boston College	1	–	6	–	1	6	–	10	–	1
Syracuse	0	–	6	–	2	6	–	8	–	4
Coastal
No. 4 North Carolina +	6	–	1	–	1	17	–	4	–	1
No. 13 Duke +	4	–	3	–	1	13	–	4	–	3
No. 19 Virginia +	3	–	2	–	3	13	–	4	–	5
No. 18 Notre Dame +	3	–	3	–	2	11	–	7	–	2
Virginia Tech +	3	–	5	–	0	10	–	10	–	0
Pittsburgh	2	–	6	–	0	8	–	10	–	0
‡ – 2017 ACC Tournament champion + – Invited to the 2017 NCAA Division I Men's Soccer Championship; As of December 13, 2017; Rankings from United Soccer Coaches

The 2017 Clemson Tigers men's soccer team represented Clemson University during the 2017 NCAA Division I men's soccer season. The Tigers were led by head coach Mike Noonan, in his eighth season. They played home games at Riggs Field. This was the team's 57th season playing organized men's college soccer and their 30th playing in the Atlantic Coast Conference. The Tigers finished with a record of 12–6–1 and an ACC record of 4–4–0. The Tigers lost in the Semifinals of the ACC tournament to eventual champions Wake Forest. They were selected to participate in the NCAA Tournament for the fifth year in a row. However, they lost to Coastal Carolina in the second round.

== Roster ==
Updated September 5, 2017

Note: Flags indicate national team as defined under FIFA eligibility rules; some limited exceptions apply. Players may hold more than one non-FIFA nationality.

No.	Pos.	Nation	Player
0	GK	USA	Daniel Kuzemka
1	GK	ESP	Ximo Miralles
2	DF	USA	Andrew Burnikel
3	DF	DEN	Patrick Bunk-Andersen
4	MF	ENG	Oliver Shannon (captain)
5	MF	SEN	Malick Mbaye
6	DF	USA	Tanner Dieterich (captain)
7	MF	CRC	Saul Chinchilla
8	MF	USA	Johnny Heckman
9	FW	JAM	Jason Wright
10	FW	CRC	Diego Campos
11	FW	USA	Robby Jacobs
12	DF	USA	Robert Campbell
13	MF	USA	Michael Melvin
14	MF	USA	Grayson Raynor

No.	Pos.	Nation	Player
16	DF	USA	Cale Thorne
17	FW	ENG	Kimarni Smith
18	MF	USA	Harrison Kurtz
19	DF	SEN	Justin Malou
20	MF	USA	Michael Ille
21	DF	USA	Trey Langolis
22	MF	USA	Quinn McNeill
24	MF	DEN	Alexander Hemmingsen
25	DF	ARG	Gian Scalise
26	DF	USA	Chris Heijjer
27	FW	USA	Kristian Shkreli
28	FW	USA	Nate Hall
29	MF	SWE	Daniel Ramlgak
30	MF	USA	Robbie Robinson
31	GK	USA	Nolan Lennon

Prior to the season, Tanner Dieterich and Oliver Shannon were named co-captains of the team.

== Coaching staff ==
Position	Staff
Athletic Director	(United States) Dan Radakovich
Head coach	(United States) Mike Noonan
Associate head coach	(England) Philip Jones
Assistant Coach	(Colombia) Camilo Rodriguez
Director of Soccer Operations	(United States) Rob Thompson
Athletic Trainer	(United States) Raz Razayeski
Strength & Conditioning Coach	(United States) Rick Franzblau

== Schedule ==
Date Time, TV	Rank^{#}	Opponent^{#}	Result	Record	Site (Attendance) City, State
Exhibition
August 12*; 7:00 pm	No. 5	at UAB	W 3–0	– (–)	West Campus Field; Birmingham, AL
August 15*; 6:00 pm	No. 5	No. 19 Coastal Carolina	W 3–1	– (–)	Riggs Field; Clemson, SC
August 19; 7:00 pm	No. 5	at No. 17 Virginia Tech	T 4–4	– (–)	Sandra D. Thompson Field; Blacksburg, VA
Regular season
August 25*; 5:00 pm	No. 5	Cal State Fullerton	W 2–0	1–0–0 (0–0–0)	Riggs Field (2,538); Clemson, SC
August 27*; 6:00 pm	No. 5	Radford	W 2–1	2–0–0 (0–0–0)	Riggs Field (1,231); Clemson, SC
September 1*; 7:00 pm	No. 5	South Carolina; Rivalry, First Friday	W 4–1	3–0–0 (0–0–0)	Riggs Field (5,610); Clemson, SC
September 4*; 7:00 pm	No. 5	at Georgia Southern	W 2–1 ^{OT}	4–0–0 (0–0–0)	Eagle Field - Erk Park (1,237); Statesboro, GA
September 8; 7:00 pm	No. 3	at NC State	L 0–1	4–1–0 (0–1–0)	Dail Soccer Field (1,589); Raleigh, NC
Cancelled*; 7:00 pm		North Florida			Riggs Field; Clemson, SC
September 15; 7:00 pm	No. 10	Boston College; Rivalry	W 1–0	5–1–0 (1–1–0)	Riggs Field (1,901); Clemson, SC
September 19*; 7:00 pm	No. 8	UCLA	W 3–0	6–1–0 (1–1–0)	Riggs Field (2,147); Clemson, SC
September 22; 7:00 pm	No. 8	Pittsburgh	W 3–0	7–1–0 (2–1–0)	Riggs Field (3,831); Clemson, SC
September 26*; 7:00 pm	No. 6	Charlotte	W 4–1	8–1–0 (2–1–0)	Riggs Field (1,308); Clemson, SC
September 29; 7:00 pm, ESPNU	No. 6	at No. 2 Wake Forest	L 2–3 ^{2OT}	8–2–0 (2–2–0)	Spry Stadium (4,781); Winston-Salem, NC
October 6; 7:00 pm	No. 5	No. 9 Notre Dame	L 1–2	8–3–0 (2–3–0)	Riggs Field (4,035); Clemson, SC
October 10*; 7:00 pm	No. 11	Gardner-Webb	W 5–0	9–3–0 (2–3–0)	Riggs Field (1,059); Clemson, SC
October 13; 7:00 pm	No. 11	at No. 16 Duke	W 4–1	10–3–0 (3–3–0)	Koskinen Stadium (758); Durham, NC
October 21; 7:00 pm	No. 7	at Syracuse	W 2–1	11–3–0 (4–3–0)	SU Soccer Stadium (1,672); Syracuse, NY
October 27; 7:00 pm	No. 4	No. 11 Louisville	L 1–2	11–4–0 (4–4–0)	Riggs Field (2,022); Clemson, SC
ACC Tournament
November 1; 7:00 pm	No. 9	Syracuse; First Round	T 2–2 (4–3 PKs) ^{2OT}	11–4–1 (4–4–0)	Riggs Field (1,348); Clemson, SC
November 5; 1:00 pm	No. 9	at No. 11 Duke; Quarterfinal	W 1–0	12–4–1 (4–4–0)	Koskinen Stadium (468); Durham, NC
November 8; 7:00 pm	No. 5	at No. 1 Wake Forest; Semifinal	L 1–2	12–5–1 (4–4–0)	Spry Stadium (1,872); Winston-Salem, NC
NCAA Tournament
November 19; 6:00 pm	No. 5	Coastal Carolina; Second Round	L 1–3	12–6–1	Riggs Field (2,091); Clemson, SC
*Non-conference game. ^{#}Rankings from United Soccer Coaches. (#) Tournament seedings in parentheses.

== Goals Record ==
Rank	No.	Nat.	Po.	Name	Regular season	ACC Tournament	NCAA Tournament	Total
1	10	(Costa Rica)	FW	Diego Campos	9	1	0	10
2	9	(Jamaica)	FW	Jason Wright	6	0	1	7
3	4	(England)	MF	Oliver Shannon	4	0	0	4
3	30	(United States)	MF	Robbie Robinson	4	0	0	4
5	17	(England)	FW	Kimarni Smith	3	0	0	3
5	3	(Denmark)	DF	Patrick Bunk-Andersen	2	1	0	3
5	7	(Costa Rica)	MF	Saul Chinchilla	1	2	0	3
8	5	(Senegal)	MF	Malick Mbaye	1	0	0	1
8	6	(United States)	DF	Tanner Dieterich	1	0	0	1
8	11	(United States)	FW	Robbie Jacobs	1	0	0	1
8	19	(Senegal)	DF	Justin Malou	1	0	0	1
8	24	(Denmark)	MF	Alexander Hemmingsen	1	0	0	1
Total					34	4	1	39

== Disciplinary record ==
Rank	No.	Nat.	Po.	Name	Regular Season			ACC Tournament			NCAA Tournament			Total		
Rank	No.	Nat.	Po.	Name	Booked	(yellow card) (yellow-red card)	Sent off (straight red)	Booked	(yellow card) (yellow-red card)	Sent off (straight red)	Booked	(yellow card) (yellow-red card)	Sent off (straight red)	Booked	(yellow card) (yellow-red card)	Sent off (straight red)
1	10	(Costa Rica)	FW	Diego Campos	4	0	1	1	0	0	0	0	0	5	0	1
2	4	(England)	MF	Oliver Shannon	2	0	0	1	0	0	1	0	0	4	0	0
2	19	(Senegal)	DF	Justin Malou	1	0	0	1	0	1	0	0	0	2	0	1
3	5	(Senegal)	MF	Malick Mbaye	3	0	0	0	0	0	0	0	0	3	0	0
3	17	(England)	FW	Kimarni Smith	2	0	0	0	0	0	1	0	0	3	0	0
4	6	(United States)	DF	Tanner Dieterich	2	0	0	0	0	0	0	0	0	2	0	0
4	12	(United States)	DF	Robert Campbell	2	0	0	0	0	0	0	0	0	2	0	0
4	18	(United States)	MF	Harrison Kurtz	2	0	0	0	0	0	0	0	0	2	0	0
4	24	(Denmark)	MF	Alexander Hemmingser	2	0	0	0	0	0	0	0	0	2	0	0
10	2	(United States)	DF	Andrew Burnikel	0	0	0	1	0	0	0	0	0	1	0	0
10	13	(United States)	MF	Michael Melvin	1	0	0	0	0	0	0	0	0	1	0	0
10	14	(United States)	MF	Grayson Raynor	1	0	0	0	0	0	0	0	0	1	0	0
10	28	(United States)	FW	Nate Hall	1	0	0	0	0	0	0	0	0	1	0	0
10	30	(United States)	MF	Robbie Robinson	1	0	0	0	0	0	0	0	0	1	0	0
10	-	-	-	Team	1	0	0	0	0	0	0	0	0	1	0	0
Total					18	0	1	4	0	1	2	0	0	24	0	2

== Awards and honors ==
Recipient	Award	Date	Ref.
Patrick Bunk-Andersen	ACC Defensive Player of the Week	September 5	
Ximo Miralles	ACC Defensive Player of the Week	September 25	
Diego Campos	ACC Offensive Player of the Week	October 16	
Diego Campos	All-ACC First Team	November 7	
Oliver Shannon	All-ACC First Team	November 7	
Robbie Robinson	ACC All Freshman Team	November 7	
Diego Campos	All-ACC Tournament Team	November 12	
Justin Malou	All-ACC Tournament Team	November 12	

== Draft picks ==
The Tigers had two players drafted in the 2018 MLS SuperDraft.

Player	Team	Round	Pick #	Position
(England) Oliver Shannon	Atlanta United	2nd	36	MF
(Costa Rica) Diego Campos	Chicago Fire	2nd	38	FW

== Rankings ==
Ranking movement Legend: ██ Improvement in ranking. ██ Decrease in ranking. ██ Not ranked the previous week. RV=Others receiving votes.
Poll	Pre	Wk 1	Wk 2	Wk 3	Wk 4	Wk 5	Wk 6	Wk 7	Wk 8	Wk 9	Wk 10	Wk 11	Wk 12	Wk 13	Wk 14	Wk 15	Wk 16	Final
United Soccer	5	5	3	10	8	6	5	11	7	4	9	5	5	None Released				17
TopDrawer Soccer	8	8	8	5	8	12	9	10	13	6	4	14	12	8	19	19	19	19
