= 2017 Louisville Cardinals men's soccer team =

American college soccer season

2017 Louisville Cardinals men's soccer

NCAA Tournament, Quarterfinals
- Conference: Atlantic Coast Conference
- U. Soc. Coaches poll: No. 7
- TopDrawerSoccer.com: No. 6
- Record: 13–2–5 (5–2–1 ACC)
- Head coach: Ken Lolla (12th season)
- Assistant coaches: Danny Cepero (5th season); John Michael Hayden (2nd season)
- Captain: Tim Kübel
- Home stadium: Lynn Stadium

2017 ACC men's soccer standings
	Conf.					Overall
Team	W		L		T	W		L		T
Atlantic
No. 5 Wake Forest ‡	7	–	0	–	1	19	–	2	–	2
No. 7 Louisville +	5	–	2	–	1	13	–	2	–	5
No. 17 Clemson +	4	–	4	–	0	12	–	6	–	1
NC State +	3	–	3	–	2	8	–	6	–	4
Boston College	1	–	6	–	1	6	–	10	–	1
Syracuse	0	–	6	–	2	6	–	8	–	4
Coastal
No. 4 North Carolina +	6	–	1	–	1	17	–	4	–	1
No. 13 Duke +	4	–	3	–	1	13	–	4	–	3
No. 19 Virginia +	3	–	2	–	3	13	–	4	–	5
No. 18 Notre Dame +	3	–	3	–	2	11	–	7	–	2
Virginia Tech +	3	–	5	–	0	10	–	10	–	0
Pittsburgh	2	–	6	–	0	8	–	10	–	0
‡ – 2017 ACC Tournament champion + – Invited to the 2017 NCAA Division I Men's Soccer Championship; As of December 13, 2017; Rankings from United Soccer Coaches

The 2017 Louisville Cardinals men's soccer team represented University of Louisville during the 2017 NCAA Division I men's soccer season. The Cardinals were led by head coach Ken Lolla, in his twelfth season. They played home games at Lynn Stadium. This was the team's 39th season playing organized men's college soccer and their 4th playing in the Atlantic Coast Conference.

== Roster ==
Updated August 7, 2017

Note: Flags indicate national team as defined under FIFA eligibility rules; some limited exceptions apply. Players may hold more than one non-FIFA nationality.

No.	Pos.	Nation	Player
1	GK	USA	Will Meyer
2	DF	MAR	Ziyad Fekri
3	DF	USA	Chris DeMartino
4	MF	FRA	Adrien Cabon
5	MF	SCO	Adam Wilson
6	MF	USA	Geoffrey Dee
7	MF	USA	Elijah Amo
8	MF	ENG	Hamam El-Fitouri
9	FW	USA	Tate Schmitt
10	FW	USA	Mohamed Thiaw
11	MF	USA	Sawyer Edwards
12	MF	SEN	Cherif Dieye
13	MF	USA	Walker Andriot
14	DF	USA	Campbell Weyland
15	DF	USA	Connor Brazil

No.	Pos.	Nation	Player
16	MF	USA	John Armbruster
17	MF	USA	Kotaro Umeda
18	DF	ENG	Danny Reynolds
19	MF	USA	Alec-Michael Petrizzi
20	MF	USA	Cody Cochran
21	FW	USA	Watterson Young
22	DF	ENG	Liam Bennett
23	FW	USA	Izaiah Jennings
24	DF	USA	Joey Kunkel
25	MF	USA	Chaz Andriot
26	MF	USA	Cameron Wheeler
27	MF	GER	Tim Kübel (captain)
28	GK	USA	William Howard
30	GK	USA	Trey Miller
31	GK	USA	Jake Gelnovatch

== Coaching staff ==
Position	Staff
Head coach	Ken Lolla
Assistant coach	Danny Cepero
Assistant coach	John Michael Hayden
Director of Operations	David Horne
Volunteer Assistant Coach	Robbe Tarver

== Schedule ==
Date Time, TV	Rank^{#}	Opponent^{#}	Result	Record	Site (Attendance) City, State
Exhibition
August 12*; 7:30 pm	No. 9	Lipscomb	W 1-0	- (-)	Lynn Stadium (923); Louisville, Kentucky
August 17*; 7:30 pm	No. 9	at No. 7 Indiana	L 2-3	- (-)	Grand Park; Westfield, Indiana
August 19*; 7:30 pm	No. 9	Oakland	T 1-1	- (-)	Lynn Stadium (675); Louisville, Kentucky
Regular season
August 25*; 7:30 pm	No. 9	UC Irvine	W 2-1	1–0–0 (0–0–0)	Lynn Stadium (2,078); Louisville, Kentucky
August 28*; 7:30 pm	No. 9	No. 25 Butler	W 1-0	2–0–0 (0–0–0)	Lynn Stadium (1,457); Louisville, Kentucky
September 1*; 7:00 pm	No. 11	at Georgia State	W 1-0	3–0–0 (0–0–0)	GSU Soccer Field (100); Atlanta
September 5*; 7:00 pm	No. 8	No. 19 Kentucky; Rivalry	T 2-2 ^{2OT}	3–0–1 (0–0–0)	Lynn Stadium (2,954); Louisville, Kentucky
September 9; 7:30 pm	No. 8	No. 2 Wake Forest	L 1-3	3–1–1 (0–1–0)	Lynn Stadium (2,708); Louisville, Kentucky
September 15; 7:00 pm	No. 17	at No. 7 Syracuse	W 2-1	4–1–1 (1–1–0)	SU Soccer Stadium (2,006); Syracuse
September 19*; 7:00 pm	No. 10	IUPUI	W 3-0	5–1–1 (1–1–0)	Lynn Stadium (1,274); Louisville, Kentucky
September 22; 7:00 pm	No. 10	Boston College	W 4-0	6–1–1 (2–1–0)	Lynn Stadium (1,947); Louisville, Kentucky
September 26*; 7:00 pm	No. 8	USF	T 1-1 ^{2OT}	6–1–2 (2–1–0)	Lynn Stadium (1,567); Louisville, Kentucky
September 30; 7:00 pm	No. 8	at No. 19 Duke	W 1-0	7–1–2 (3–1–0)	Koskinen Stadium (1,103); Durham, North Carolina
October 6; 7:00 pm	No. 7	at Virginia Tech	W 1-0	8–1–2 (4–1–0)	Sandra D. Thompson Field (573); Blacksburg, Virginia
October 10*; 7:00 pm	No. 5	Florida Atlantic	W 5-0	9–1–2 (4–1–0)	Lynn Stadium (918); Louisville, Kentucky
October 13; 7:00 pm	No. 5	No. 4 North Carolina; Alumni Weekend	T 0-0 ^{2OT}	9–1–3 (4–1–1)	Lynn Stadium (3,435); Louisville, Kentucky
October 17*; 7:00 pm	No. 5	at Charlotte	W 1-0 ^{OT}	10–1–3 (4–1–1)	Transamerica Field (1,027); Charlotte, North Carolina
October 21; 7:00 pm	No. 5	NC State; Senior Day	L 2-3	10–2–3 (4–2–1)	Lynn Stadium (1,978); Louisville, Kentucky
October 27; 7:00 pm	No. 11	No. 4 Clemson	W 2-1	11–2–3 (4–2–1)	Riggs Field (2,022); Clemson, South Carolina
ACC Tournament
November 5; 1:00 pm	No. 6	No. 16 Virginia; Quarterfinal	T 0-0 (3–4 PK) ^{2OT}	11–2–4 (4–2–1)	Lynn Stadium (738); Louisville, Kentucky
NCAA Tournament
November 19; 5:00 pm	No. 9	San Francisco; Second Round	W 3-2	12–2–4	Lynn Stadium (833); Louisville, Kentucky
November 26; 5:00 pm	No. 9	Colgate; Third Round	W 2–0	13–2–4	Lynn Stadium (1,302); Louisville, Kentucky
December 1; 7:00 pm	No. 9	No. 4 Akron; Quarterfinal	T 0–0 3–4 PKs ^{2OT}	13–2–5	Lynn Stadium (3,179); Louisville, Kentucky
*Non-conference game. ^{#}Rankings from United Soccer Coaches. (#) Tournament seedings in parentheses.

== Awards and honors ==
Recipient	Award	Date	Ref.
Tim Kübel	ACC Offensive Player of the Week	September 5	
Tim Kübel	All-ACC First Team	November 7	
Tim Kübel	United Soccer Coaches All-American	December 7	
Tim Kübel	Soccer America All-American	December 8	
Tim Kübel	College Soccer News All-American	January 4	
Tate Schmitt	All-ACC Second Team	November 7	
Mohamed Thiaw	All-ACC Second Team	November 7	

== Rankings ==
Ranking movement Legend: ██ Improvement in ranking. ██ Decrease in ranking. ██ Not ranked the previous week. RV=Others receiving votes.
Poll	Pre	Wk 1	Wk 2	Wk 3	Wk 4	Wk 5	Wk 6	Wk 7	Wk 8	Wk 9	Wk 10	Wk 11	Wk 12	Wk 13	Wk 14	Wk 15	Wk 16	Final
United Soccer	9	11	8	17	10	8	7	5	5	11	6	9	9	None Released				7
TopDrawer Soccer	12	12	11	7	13	9	7	6	6	7	15	13	13	9	11	6	6	6

== MLS Draft ==
The following members of the 2017 Louisville Cardinals men's soccer team were selected in the 2018 MLS SuperDraft.

Player	Round	Pick	Position	MLS club	Ref.
Tim Kübel	2	28	DF	Toronto FC	
Mohamed Thiaw	2	35	FW	San Jose Earthquakes	
