= 2017 Notre Dame Fighting Irish men's soccer team =

American college soccer season

2017 Notre Dame Fighting Irish men's soccer

NCAA Tournament, Second Round
- Conference: Atlantic Coast Conference
- U. Soc. Coaches poll: No. 18
- TopDrawerSoccer.com: No. 22
- Record: 11–7–2 (3–3–2 ACC)
- Head coach: Bobby Clark (17th season)
- Assistant coaches: B. J. Craig (10th season); Michael Casper (3rd season)
- Captains: Matt Habrowski; Chris Hubbard; Jon Gallagher
- Home stadium: Alumni Stadium

2017 ACC men's soccer standings
	Conf.					Overall
Team	W		L		T	W		L		T
Atlantic
No. 5 Wake Forest ‡	7	–	0	–	1	19	–	2	–	2
No. 7 Louisville +	5	–	2	–	1	13	–	2	–	5
No. 17 Clemson +	4	–	4	–	0	12	–	6	–	1
NC State +	3	–	3	–	2	8	–	6	–	4
Boston College	1	–	6	–	1	6	–	10	–	1
Syracuse	0	–	6	–	2	6	–	8	–	4
Coastal
No. 4 North Carolina +	6	–	1	–	1	17	–	4	–	1
No. 13 Duke +	4	–	3	–	1	13	–	4	–	3
No. 19 Virginia +	3	–	2	–	3	13	–	4	–	5
No. 18 Notre Dame +	3	–	3	–	2	11	–	7	–	2
Virginia Tech +	3	–	5	–	0	10	–	10	–	0
Pittsburgh	2	–	6	–	0	8	–	10	–	0
‡ – 2017 ACC Tournament champion + – Invited to the 2017 NCAA Division I Men's Soccer Championship; As of December 13, 2017; Rankings from United Soccer Coaches

The 2017 Notre Dame Fighting Irish men's soccer team represented University of Notre Dame during the 2017 NCAA Division I men's soccer season. It was the program's 40th season. It was the program's 5th season competing in the Atlantic Coast Conference. The Fighting Irish were led by head coach Bobby Clark, in his seventeenth year.

== Roster ==
Note: Flags indicate national team as defined under FIFA eligibility rules; some limited exceptions apply. Players may hold more than one non-FIFA nationality.

No.	Pos.	Nation	Player
0	GK	USA	Ryan Krutz
1	GK	USA	Chris Hubbard (captain)
3	FW	USA	Spencer Farina
4	DF	USA	Matt Habrowski (captain)
5	MF	FRA	Félicien Dumas
6	MF	SCO	Sean Macleod
7	MF	USA	Jack Casey
8	MF	USA	Nick Cullen
9	FW	USA	Jeffrey Farina
10	FW	IRL	Jon Gallagher (captain)
11	DF	USA	Sean Dedrick
12	MF	USA	Kyle Dedrick
13	GK	USA	Duncan Turnbull
14	FW	USA	Simon Roennecke

No.	Pos.	Nation	Player
15	MF	USA	Aiden McFadden
16	MF	USA	Tommy McCabe
17	DF	USA	Senan Farrelly
18	MF	USA	Townsend Meyer
20	MF	USA	Blake Townes
21	FW	USA	Thomas Ueland
22	FW	USA	Ian Aschieris
23	DF	USA	Mitch MacDonald
24	FW	USA	Paul Rothrock
25	DF	USA	Patrick Berneski
26	MF	USA	Kurt Roemer
27	FW	USA	John Rea
28	DF	USA	Brian Finn
30	GK	USA	Keagan McLaughlin

Prior to the season the Irish named three captains: Chris Hubbard, Matt Habrowski, and Jon Gallagher.

== Coaching staff ==
Position	Staff
Athletic director	Jack Swarbrick
Head coach	Bobby Clark
Associate head coach	B.J. Craigh
Assistant coach	Michael Casper
Volunteer Assistant Coach	Vern Gingerich
Director of Operations	Giuliana Figliomeni

== Schedule ==
Date Time, TV	Rank^{#}	Opponent^{#}	Result	Record	Site City, State
Exhibition
August 13*; 8:00 pm	No. 10	at Omaha	W 2-0	- (-)	Caniglia Field; Omaha, NE
August 16*; 8:00 pm	No. 10	at Drake	W 4-1	- (-)	Cownie Sports Complex; Des Moines, IA
August 21*; 5:00 pm	No. 10	Valparaiso	W 3-0	- (-)	Alumni Stadium (636); Notre Dame, IN
Regular Season
August 25*; 7:30 pm	No. 10	San Diego; Mike Berticelli Memorial Tournament	W 2-0	1-0-0 (0-0-0)	Alumni Stadium (746); Notre Dame, IN
August 27*; 2:00 pm	No. 10	Cal Poly; Mike Berticelli Memorial Tournament	W 2-1 ^{2OT}	2-0-0 (0-0-0)	Alumni Stadium; Notre Dame, IN
September 2*; 7:00 pm	No. 9	at Connecticut	W 1-0	3-0-0 (0-0-0)	Morrone Stadium (4,522); Storrs, CT
September 8; 5:00 pm	No. 6	at Boston College	W 3-1	4-0-0 (1-0-0)	Newton Soccer Complex (846); Chestnut Hill, MA
September 15; 7:30 pm	No. 2	NC State	W 3-0	5-0-0 (2-0-0)	Alumni Stadium (1,221); Notre Dame, IN
September 19*; 7:00 pm	No. 1	Bowling Green	W 2-1	6-0-0 (2-0-0)	Alumni Stadium (678); Notre Dame, IN
September 22; 7:00 pm	No. 1	at Virginia Tech	L 1-2	6-1-0 (2-1-0)	Thompson Field (1,526); Blacksburg, VA
September 26*; 7:00 pm	No. 7	at No. 1 Indiana	L 0-1	6-2-0 (2-1-0)	Armstrong Stadium (4,654); Bloomington, IN
September 29; 7:30 pm	No. 7	No. 10 Virginia	T 1-1	6-2-1 (2-1-1)	Alumni Stadium (2,158); Notre Dame, IN
October 3*; 7:00 pm	No. 9	Northwestern	W 2-1 ^{OT}	7-2-1 (2-1-1)	Alumni Stadium (565); Notre Dame, IN
October 6; 7:00 pm	No. 9	at No. 5 Clemson	W 2-1	8-2-1 (3-1-1)	Riggs Field (4,035); Clemson, SC
October 10*; 7:00 pm	No. 7	No. 24 Michigan	W 3-1	9-2-1 (3-1-1)	Alumni Stadium (660); Notre Dame, IN
October 13; 7:00 pm	No. 7	Pittsburgh	L 0-1	9-3-1 (3-2-1)	Alumni Stadium (825); Notre Dame, IN
October 17*; 7:00 pm	No. 12	at No. 19 Akron	L 0-2	9-4-1 (3-2-1)	FirstEnergy Stadium (1,905); Akron, OH
October 20; 7:00 pm	No. 12	No. 15 Duke	T 0-0 ^{2OT}	9-4-2 (3-2-2)	Alumni Stadium (1,703); Notre Dame, IN
October 24*; 7:00 pm	No. 16	at No. 7 Michigan State	Cancelled	9-4-2 (3-2-2)	DeMartin Soccer Complex; East Lansing, MI
October 27; 7:00 pm	No. 16	at No. 3 North Carolina	L 0-3	9-5-2 (3-3-2)	WakeMed Soccer Park (1,226); Cary, NC
ACC Tournament
November 1; 7:00 pm	No. 21	Pittsburgh; First Round	W 5-0	10-5-2 (3-3-2)	Alumni Stadium (128); Notre Dame, IN
November 5; 1:00 pm	No. 21	at No. 3 North Carolina; Quarterfinals	W 2-1	11-5-2 (3-3-2)	WakeMed Soccer Park; Cary, NC
November 8; 7:00 pm	No. 13	at No. 17 Virginia; Semifinals	L 2-1	11-6-2 (3-3-2)	Klöckner Stadium (1142); Charlottesville, VA
NCAA Tournament
November 19; 6:00 pm	No. 12	No. 20 Wisconsin; Second Round	L 0-1 ^{OT}	11-7-2	Alumni Stadium; Notre Dame, IN
*Non-conference game. ^{#}Rankings from United Soccer Coaches. (#) Tournament seedings in parentheses.

== Awards and honors ==
Recipient	Award	Date	Ref.
Jon Gallagher	ACC Offensive Player of the Week	September 12	
Felicien Dumas	ACC Defensive Player of the Week	September 18	
Jon Gallagher	ACC Offensive Player of the Week	October 9	
Jon Gallagher	All ACC First Team	November 7	
Jeffrey Farina	All ACC Third Team	November 7	
Jeff Farina	ACC All Tournament Team	November 12	
Jon Gallagher	ACC All Tournament Team	November 12	
Jon Gallagher	United Soccer Coaches All-American Second Team	December 7	
Jon Gallagher	Soccer America All-American Second Team	December 8	
Jon Gallagher	College Soccer News All-American First Team	January 4	

== Rankings ==
Ranking movement Legend: ██ Improvement in ranking. ██ Decrease in ranking. ██ Not ranked the previous week. RV=Others receiving votes.
Poll	Pre	Wk 1	Wk 2	Wk 3	Wk 4	Wk 5	Wk 6	Wk 7	Wk 8	Wk 9	Wk 10	Wk 11	Wk 12	Wk 13	Wk 14	Wk 15	Wk 16	Final
United Soccer	10	9	6	2	1	7	9	7	12	16	21	13	12	None Released				18
TopDrawer Soccer	17	17	10	6	3	4	8	7	7	8	16	21	14	10	22	22	22	22

== MLS Draft ==
The following members of the 2017 Notre Dame Fighting Irish men's soccer team were selected in the 2018 MLS SuperDraft.

Player	Round	Pick	Position	MLS club	Ref.
Jon Gallagher	1	14	MF	Atlanta United	
