= 2017 North Carolina Tar Heels men's soccer team =

American college soccer season

2017 North Carolina Tar Heels men's soccer

NCAA Tournament, Semifinals
- Conference: Atlantic Coast Conference
- U. Soc. Coaches poll: No. 4
- TopDrawerSoccer.com: No. 4
- Record: 17–4–1 (6–1–1 ACC)
- Head coach: Carlos Somoano (6th season)
- Assistant coaches: Cristian Neagu (2nd season); Grant Porter (6th season); Joe Scachetti (2nd season)
- Captain: David October
- Home stadium: WakeMed Soccer Park

2017 ACC men's soccer standings
	Conf.					Overall
Team	W		L		T	W		L		T
Atlantic
No. 5 Wake Forest ‡	7	–	0	–	1	19	–	2	–	2
No. 7 Louisville +	5	–	2	–	1	13	–	2	–	5
No. 17 Clemson +	4	–	4	–	0	12	–	6	–	1
NC State +	3	–	3	–	2	8	–	6	–	4
Boston College	1	–	6	–	1	6	–	10	–	1
Syracuse	0	–	6	–	2	6	–	8	–	4
Coastal
No. 4 North Carolina +	6	–	1	–	1	17	–	4	–	1
No. 13 Duke +	4	–	3	–	1	13	–	4	–	3
No. 19 Virginia +	3	–	2	–	3	13	–	4	–	5
No. 18 Notre Dame +	3	–	3	–	2	11	–	7	–	2
Virginia Tech +	3	–	5	–	0	10	–	10	–	0
Pittsburgh	2	–	6	–	0	8	–	10	–	0
‡ – 2017 ACC Tournament champion + – Invited to the 2017 NCAA Division I Men's Soccer Championship; As of December 13, 2017; Rankings from United Soccer Coaches

The 2017 North Carolina Tar Heels men's soccer team represented the University of North Carolina at Chapel Hill during the 2017 NCAA Division I men's soccer season. It was the 71st season of the university fielding a program. The Tar Heels played their home games at WakeMed Soccer Park in nearby Cary, North Carolina while Fetzer Field underwent renovations.

== Roster ==
Updated August 10, 2017

Note: Flags indicate national team as defined under FIFA eligibility rules; some limited exceptions apply. Players may hold more than one non-FIFA nationality.

No.	Pos.	Nation	Player
1	GK	USA	James Pyle
2	MF	USA	Mauricio Pineda
4	DF	CAN	Alex Comsia
5	DF	USA	John Nelson
6	MF	USA	Cam Lindley
7	FW	USA	Lucas Del Rosario
8	MF	USA	Jack Skahan
9	MF	USA	Drew Murphy
10	FW	USA	Zach Wright
11	MF	ENG	David October (captain)
12	GK	USA	Drew Romig
13	DF	USA	Evan Krause
14	FW	GER	Nils Bruening
15	DF	USA	Will Campbell
16	MF	USA	David Mejia
17	MF	USA	Jesus Bolivar
18	FW	USA	Alan Winn
19	MF	USA	Martin Salas

No.	Pos.	Nation	Player
20	MF	USA	Alex Moztarzadeh
21	FW	USA	Alex Rose
22	MF	USA	Dominic Jensen
23	MF	USA	Andy Lopez
24	GK	USA	Johan Welch
25	DF	NZL	Liam Williams
26	FW	USA	Jelani Pieters
27	DF	USA	Mark Salas
28	MF	USA	Raul Aguilera
29	MF	USA	Jeremy Kelly
30	GK	USA	Alec Smir
31	FW	LTU	Julius Momkus
32	DF	USA	Luke Ciocca
33	DF	USA	Mason Wittman
34	MF	USA	Zack Olofson
35	DF	ENG	Charlie Forecast
36	DF	USA	Prince Agyie
38	FW	USA	Giovanni Montesdeoca

== Coaching staff ==
Position	Staff
Athletic director	Bubba Cunningham
Head coach	Carlos Somoano
Assistant coach	Grant Porter
Assistant coach	Cristian Neagu
Volunteer Assistant Coach	Joe Scachetti

== Schedule ==
Date Time, TV	Rank^{#}	Opponent^{#}	Result	Record	Site (Attendance) City, State
Exhibition
August 13*; 7:00 pm	No. 4	No. 19 Coastal Carolina	W 3–1	– (–)	WakeMed Soccer Park; Cary, NC
August 17*; 7:30 pm	No. 4	at South Carolina; Battle of the Carolinas	T 0–0	– (–)	Stone Stadium; Columbia, SC
Regular season
August 25*; 7:30 pm	No. 4	No. 12 Providence; Carolina Nike Classic	W 4–2	1–0–0 (0-0-0)	Rudd Field (826); Elon, NC
August 27*; 7:30 pm	No. 4	Rutgers; Carolina Nike Classic	W 6–1	2–0–0 (0-0-0)	WakeMed Soccer Park (926); Cary, NC
September 1*; 7:00 pm	No. 3	at UNC Wilmington	L 0–1	2–1–0 (0-0-0)	UNC Wilmington Soccer Stadium (1,778); Wilmington, NC
September 4*; 7:00 pm	No. 3	at UNC Greensboro	W 2–1	3–1–0 (0-0-0)	UNCG Soccer Stadium (3,072); Greensboro, NC
September 9; 7:00 pm	No. 10	at Pittsburgh	W 2–1	4–1–0 (1–0–0)	Ambrose Urbanic Field (571); Pittsburgh, PA
September 13*; 7:00 pm	No. 8	William & Mary	W 3–2	5–1–0 (1–0–0)	WakeMed Soccer Park (616); Cary, NC
September 16*; 7:00 pm	No. 8	vs. No. 23 Duke; Rivalry	W 2–1	6–1–0 (2–0–0)	Bryan Park (3,002); Greensboro, NC
September 19*; 7:00 pm	No. 7	George Washington	W 4–1	7–1–0 (2–0–0)	WakeMed Soccer Park (418); Cary, NC
September 22; 7:00 pm	No. 7	at No. 9 Virginia; South's Oldest Rivalry	W 2–1 ^{OT}	8–1–0 (3–0–0)	Klöckner Stadium (4,205); Charlottesville, VA
September 26*; 7:00 pm	No. 5	Winthrop	W 4–0	9–1–0 (3–0–0)	UNCG Soccer Stadium (226); Greensboro, NC
September 29; 7:00 pm	No. 5	NC State; Rivalry	W 1–0	10–1–0 (4–0–0)	WakeMed Soccer Park (3,206); Cary, NC
October 3*; 7:00 pm	No. 3	James Madison	W 6–0	11–1–0 (4–0–0)	WakeMed Soccer Park (438); Cary, NC
October 6; 7:00 pm	No. 4	No. 2 Wake Forest; Rivalry	L 1–2	11–2–0 (4–1–0)	WakeMed Soccer Park (2,006); Cary, NC
October 13; 7:00 pm	No. 4	at No. 5 Louisville	T 0–0 ^{2OT}	11–2–1 (4–1–1)	Lynn Stadium (3,435); Louisville, KY
October 17*; 7:00 pm	No. 4	Old Dominion	W 2–1 ^{2OT}	12–2–1 (4–1–1)	WakeMed Soccer Park (200); Cary, NC
October 22; 2:30 pm	No. 4	at Virginia Tech	W 4–0	13–2–1 (5–1–1)	Sandra D. Thompson Field (850); Blacksburg, VA
October 27; 7:00 pm	No. 3	No. 16 Notre Dame; Senior Night	W 3–0	14–2–1 (6–1–1)	WakeMed Soccer Park (1,226); Cary, NC
ACC Tournament
November 5; 1:00 pm, ESPN3	(2) No. 3	(7) No. 21 Notre Dame; ACC Quarterfinal	L 1–2	14–3–1 (6–1–1)	WakeMed Soccer Park (395); Cary, NC
NCAA Tournament
November 19*; 7:00 pm, ESPN3	(3) No. 7	UNC Wilmington; Second Round	W 2–1	15–3–1	WakeMed Soccer Park (910); Cary, NC
November 25*; 6:00 pm, ESPN3	(3) No. 7	No. 10 Southern Methodist; Third Round	W 2–0	16–3–1	WakeMed Soccer Park (485); Cary, NC
December 2*; 6:00 pm, ESPN3	(3) No. 7	Fordham; Quarterfinals	W 2–1	17–3–1	WakeMed Soccer Park (1,687); Cary, NC
December 8*; 8:45 pm, ESPNU	(3) No. 7	vs. (2) No. 2 Indiana; College Cup, Semifinals	L 0–1	17–4–1	Talen Energy Stadium (4,948); Chester, PA
*Non-conference game. ^{#}Rankings from United Soccer Coaches. (#) Tournament seedings in parentheses.

== Awards and honors ==
Recipient	Award	Date	Ref.
Jelani Pieters	ACC Offensive Player of the Week	August 28	
Cam Lindley	ACC Midfielder of the Year	November 7	
Cam Lindley	All ACC First Team	November 7	
Alan Winn	All ACC First Team	November 7	
Zach Wright	All ACC Second Team	November 7	
Alex Comsia	All ACC Third Team	November 7	
Mauricio Pineda	All ACC Third Team	November 7	
John Nelson	All ACC Rookie Team	November 7	
Cam Lindley	United Soccer Coaches All-American First Team	December 7	
Cam Lindley	Soccer America All-American First Team	December 8	
Cam Lindley	College Soccer News All-American First Team	January 4	
Allan Winn	United Soccer Coaches All-American Second Team	December 7	
Allan Winn	Soccer America All-American Second Team	December 8	
Allan Winn	College Soccer News All-American Second Team	January 4	

== Rankings ==
Ranking movements Legend: ██ Increase in ranking ██ Decrease in ranking
	Week																	
Poll	Pre	1	2	3	4	5	6	7	8	9	10	11	12	13	14	15	16	Final
United Soccer	4	3	10	8	7	5	4	4	4	3	3	6	7	Not released				4
TopDrawer Soccer	4	4	4	14	16	13	5	3	4	4	3	3	8	6	5	4	4	4

== MLS Draft ==
The following members of the 2017 North Carolina Tar Heels men's soccer team were selected in the 2018 MLS SuperDraft.

Player	Round	Pick	Position	MLS club	Ref.
Alan Winn	2	25	FW	Colorado Rapids	

== See also ==
- North Carolina Tar Heels men's soccer
- 2017 Atlantic Coast Conference men's soccer season
- 2017 NCAA Division I men's soccer season
- 2017 ACC Men's Soccer Tournament
- 2017 NCAA Division I Men's Soccer Championship
