= 2017 NC State Wolfpack men's soccer team =

American college soccer season

2017 NC State Wolfpack men's soccer

NCAA Tournament, First Round
- Conference: Atlantic Coast Conference
- Record: 8–6–4 (3–3–2 ACC)
- Head coach: George Kiefer (1st season)
- Assistant coaches: Jeff Negalha (1st season); Kyle Nicholls (1st season); Samuel Castellanos (1st season)
- Captain: Julius Duchscherer
- Home stadium: Dail Soccer Field

2017 ACC men's soccer standings
| | Conf. | | | | | Overall |
| Team | W | | L | | T | W | | L | | T |
|---|---|---|---|---|---|---|---|---|---|---|
Atlantic
| No. 5 Wake Forest ‡ | 7 | – | 0 | – | 1 | 19 | – | 2 | – | 2 |
| No. 7 Louisville + | 5 | – | 2 | – | 1 | 13 | – | 2 | – | 5 |
| No. 17 Clemson + | 4 | – | 4 | – | 0 | 12 | – | 6 | – | 1 |
| NC State + | 3 | – | 3 | – | 2 | 8 | – | 6 | – | 4 |
| Boston College | 1 | – | 6 | – | 1 | 6 | – | 10 | – | 1 |
| Syracuse | 0 | – | 6 | – | 2 | 6 | – | 8 | – | 4 |
Coastal
| No. 4 North Carolina + | 6 | – | 1 | – | 1 | 17 | – | 4 | – | 1 |
| No. 13 Duke + | 4 | – | 3 | – | 1 | 13 | – | 4 | – | 3 |
| No. 19 Virginia + | 3 | – | 2 | – | 3 | 13 | – | 4 | – | 5 |
| No. 18 Notre Dame + | 3 | – | 3 | – | 2 | 11 | – | 7 | – | 2 |
| Virginia Tech + | 3 | – | 5 | – | 0 | 10 | – | 10 | – | 0 |
| Pittsburgh | 2 | – | 6 | – | 0 | 8 | – | 10 | – | 0 |
‡ – 2017 ACC Tournament champion + – Invited to the 2017 NCAA Division I Men's Soccer Championship; As of December 13, 2017; Rankings from United Soccer Coaches

The 2017 NC State Wolfpack men's soccer team represented North Carolina State University during the 2017 NCAA Division I men's soccer season. The Wolfpack were led by head coach George Kiefer, in his first season. They played home games at Dail Soccer Field. NC State finished the season with an overall record of 8–6–4 and an ACC record of 3–3–2, earning the team their first appearance in the NCAA Tournament since 2009.

== Roster ==
Updated August 28, 2017

Note: Flags indicate national team as defined under FIFA eligibility rules; some limited exceptions apply. Players may hold more than one non-FIFA nationality.

| No. | Pos. | Nation | Player |
|---|---|---|---|
| 2 | FW | USA | Emanuel Perez |
| 3 | DF | USA | Caleb Duvernay |
| 4 | DF | USA | David Norris |
| 5 | FW | USA | Stephen Elias |
| 6 | DF | SUI | Christoph Schneuwly |
| 7 | FW | USA | Tanner Roberts |
| 8 | MF | USA | Brad Sweeney |
| 9 | FW | BEN | Ade Taiwo |
| 10 | FW | USA | David Loera |
| 11 | FW | USA | Tyler Gabarra |
| 12 | GK | USA | Vincent Durand |
| 13 | DF | GER | Simon Blotko |
| 14 | FW | USA | Clay Sparks |

| No. | Pos. | Nation | Player |
|---|---|---|---|
| 15 | MF | GER | Maximilian Luftl |
| 16 | MF | GER | Julius Duchscherer (captain) |
| 17 | MF | USA | Nick Retzlaff |
| 18 | MF | USA | Andrew Malinich |
| 19 | DF | IRL | Jake Dykes |
| 21 | MF | GER | Jan-Luca Ahillen |
| 22 | MF | USA | Anthony Ruggiero |
| 24 | DF | USA | Mac Gourlay |
| 25 | MF | USA | Jose Morales Jr. |
| 26 | GK | USA | Nick Cournoyer |
| 29 | DF | USA | Harry Adanuty |
| 30 | GK | GER | Leon Krapf |

== Coaching staff ==
| Position | Staff |
|---|---|
| Athletic director | Debbie Yow |
| Head coach | George Kiefer |
| Associate Head Coach | Jeff Negalha |
| Assistant coach | Kyle Nicholls |
| Assistant coach | Samuel Castellanos |
| Director of Soccer | Lindsey Krakower |
| Senior Associate AD/Sports Administration & Student Services | Raymond Harrison |
| Athletic trainer | Kasey Byzewski |
| Academics | Maria Crockett |
| Assistant director of Sport Nutrition | Amanda Poppleton |
| Assistant Athletics Communications Director | Brett Compton |

== Schedule ==
| Date Time, TV | Rank^{#} | Opponent^{#} | Result | Record | Site (Attendance) City, State |
Exhibition
| August 13*; 7:00 pm | | Appalachian State | T 0–0 | - (-) | Dail Soccer Field; Raleigh, NC |
| August 19*; 7:00 pm | | at Connecticut | W 4–1 | - (-) | Joseph J. Morrone Stadium (650); Storrs, CT |
Regular season
| August 25*; 7:00 pm | | Florida Atlantic | W 3–2 | 1–0–0 (0–0–0) | Dail Soccer Field (1,543); Raleigh, NC |
| August 28*; 7:00 pm | | at William & Mary | L 2–3 ^{OT} | 1–1–0 (0–0–0) | Albert-Daly Field (419); Williamsburg, VA |
| September 1*; 4:00 pm | | LIU Brooklyn | Cancelled | 1–0–0 (0–0–0) | Dail Soccer Field; Raleigh, NC |
| September 8; 7:00 pm | | No. 3 Clemson | W 1–0 | 2–1–0 (1–0–0) | Dail Soccer Field (1,589); Raleigh, NC |
| September 10; 7:00 pm | | at Longwood | W 2–1 | 3–1–0 (1–0–0) | Dail Soccer Field (342); Raleigh, NC |
| September 15; 7:30 pm | | at No. 2 Notre Dame | L 0–3 | 3–2–0 (1–1–0) | Alumni Stadium (1,221); South Bend, IN |
| September 19*; 7:00 pm | | at Elon | T 0–0 ^{2OT} | 3–2–1 (1–1–0) | Rudd Field (837); Elon, NC |
| September 23; 7:00 pm | | No. 4 Wake Forest | L 0–3 | 3–3–1 (1–2–0) | Dail Soccer Field (1,539); Raleigh, NC |
| September 26*; 7:00 pm | | UNC Asheville | W 3–0 | 4–3–1 (1–2–0) | Dail Soccer Field (693); Raleigh, NC |
| September 29; 7:00 pm | | at No. 5 North Carolina | L 0–1 | 4–4–1 (1–3–0) | WakeMed Soccer Park (3,206); Cary, NC |
| October 3*; 7:00 pm | | Belmont | W 3–0 | 5–4–1 (1–3–0) | Dail Soccer Field (703); Raleigh, NC |
| October 6; 7:00 pm | | at Syracuse | W 2–1 | 6–4–1 (2–3–0) | SU Soccer Stadium (1,211); Syracuse, NY |
| October 10*; 7:00 pm | | USC Upstate | T 0–0 ^{2OT} | 6–4–2 (2–3–0) | Dail Soccer Field (309); Raleigh, NC |
| October 13; 7:00 pm | | No. 10 Virginia | T 0–0 ^{2OT} | 6–4–3 (2–3–1) | Dail Soccer Field (956); Raleigh, NC |
| October 17*; 7:00 pm | | UNC Wilmington | W 2–1 | 7–4–3 (2–3–1) | Dail Soccer Field (534); Raleigh, NC |
| October 21; 7:00 pm | | at No. 5 Louisville | W 3–2 | 8–4–3 (3–3–1) | Lynn Stadium (1,978); Louisville, KY |
| October 24*; 7:00 pm | | South Carolina | Cancelled | | Dail Soccer Field; Raleigh, NC |
| October 27; 7:00 pm | | Boston College; Senior Night | T 0–0 ^{2OT} | 8–4–4 (3–3–2) | Dail Soccer Field (609); Raleigh, NC |
ACC Tournament
| November 1; 7:00 pm | | Virginia Tech; ACC First Round | L 0–1 ^{OT} | 8–5–4 (3–3–2) | Dail Soccer Field (800); Raleigh, NC |
NCAA Tournament
| November 16; 7:00 pm | | at No. 25 Old Dominion; NCAA First Round | L 0–2 | 8–6–4 (3–3–2) | Old Dominion Soccer Complex; Norfolk, VA |
*Non-conference game. ^{#}Rankings from United Soccer Coaches. (#) Tournament seedings in parentheses.

== Awards and honors ==
| Recipient | Award | Date | Ref. |
|---|---|---|---|
| Manny Perez | ACC Offensive Player of the Week | October 23 | |
| Manny Perez | ACC Freshman of the Year | November 7 | |
| Manny Perez | All-ACC Second Team | November 7 | |
| Manny Perez | All-ACC Freshman Team | November 7 | |
| David Loera | All-ACC Freshman Team | November 7 | |

== Rankings ==
Ranking movement Legend: ██ Improvement in ranking. ██ Decrease in ranking. ██ Not ranked the previous week. RV=Others receiving votes.
| Poll | Pre | Wk 1 | Wk 2 | Wk 3 | Wk 4 | Wk 5 | Wk 6 | Wk 7 | Wk 8 | Wk 9 | Wk 10 | Wk 11 | Wk 12 | Wk 13 | Wk 14 | Wk 15 | Wk 16 | Final |
|---|---|---|---|---|---|---|---|---|---|---|---|---|---|---|---|---|---|---|
| United Soccer Coaches | | | | | RV | RV | RV | RV | | RV | | RV | RV | None Released | | | | |
| TopDrawer Soccer | | | | | RV | | | | | | | | | | | | | |

== MLS Draft ==
The following members of the 2017 NC State Wolfpack men's soccer team were selected in the 2018 MLS SuperDraft.

| Player | Round | Pick | Position | MLS club | Ref. |
|---|---|---|---|---|---|
| Caleb Duvernay | 3 | 61 | DF | Portland Timbers | |
