= 2017 Virginia Cavaliers men's soccer team =

American college soccer season

2017 Virginia Cavaliers men's soccer

NCAA Tournament, Second Round
- Conference: Atlantic Coast Conference
- U. Soc. Coaches poll: No. 19
- TopDrawerSoccer.com: No. 21
- Record: 13–4–5 (3–2–3 ACC)
- Head coach: George Gelnovatch (22nd season)
- Assistant coaches: Matt Chulis (11th season); Terry Boss (4th season)
- Home stadium: Klöckner Stadium

2017 ACC men's soccer standings
	Conf.					Overall
Team	W		L		T	W		L		T
Atlantic
No. 5 Wake Forest ‡	7	–	0	–	1	19	–	2	–	2
No. 7 Louisville +	5	–	2	–	1	13	–	2	–	5
No. 17 Clemson +	4	–	4	–	0	12	–	6	–	1
NC State +	3	–	3	–	2	8	–	6	–	4
Boston College	1	–	6	–	1	6	–	10	–	1
Syracuse	0	–	6	–	2	6	–	8	–	4
Coastal
No. 4 North Carolina +	6	–	1	–	1	17	–	4	–	1
No. 13 Duke +	4	–	3	–	1	13	–	4	–	3
No. 19 Virginia +	3	–	2	–	3	13	–	4	–	5
No. 18 Notre Dame +	3	–	3	–	2	11	–	7	–	2
Virginia Tech +	3	–	5	–	0	10	–	10	–	0
Pittsburgh	2	–	6	–	0	8	–	10	–	0
‡ – 2017 ACC Tournament champion + – Invited to the 2017 NCAA Division I Men's Soccer Championship; As of December 13, 2017; Rankings from United Soccer Coaches

The 2017 Virginia Cavaliers men's soccer team represented University of Virginia during the 2017 NCAA Division I men's soccer season. The Cavaliers were led by head coach George Gelnovatch, in his twenty-second season. They play home games at Klöckner Stadium. This was the team's 77th season playing organized men's college soccer and their 64th playing in the Atlantic Coast Conference.

== Roster ==
Updated 07/28/17

Note: Flags indicate national team as defined under FIFA eligibility rules; some limited exceptions apply. Players may hold more than one non-FIFA nationality.

No.	Pos.	Nation	Player
0	GK	USA	Connor Jones
1	GK	USA	Jeff Caldwell
2	DF	ESP	Sergi Nus
3	DF	USA	Fabrice Shema
4	DF	USA	Nate Odusote
5	DF	USA	Henry Kessler
6	MF	USA	Hayes Fountain
7	DF	USA	Bay Kurtz
8	MF	GUA	Pablo Aguilar
9	FW	USA	Kennedy Nwabia
10	FW	USA	Cameron Harr
11	FW	USA	Edward Opoku
12	MF	NZL	Joe Bell
13	DF	NGA	Prosper Figbe
15	MF	DEN	Daniel Barir
16	MF	USA	Liam Jenkins
17	FW	USA	Simeon Okoro
18	GK	USA	Colin Shutler

No.	Pos.	Nation	Player
19	FW	ENG	Nathaniel Crofts
20	MF	AUS	Ryan Peterson
21	MF	USA	Aaron James
22	MF	USA	Jean-Christophe Koffi
23	MF	USA	Justin Ingram
24	FW	USA	Jerren Nixon
25	DF	USA	Max Diamond
26	FW	USA	Raheem Taylor-Parkes
27	FW	USA	Leon Maric
30	DF	GER	Robin Afamefuna
31	DF	USA	Sheldon Sullivan
32	MF	USA	Julian Cummings
33	FW	USA	Ahdan Tait
34	FW	TAN	Irakoze Donasiyano
35	MF	USA	Brad Kurtz
36	DF	USA	Spencer Patton
37	MF	USA	Beau Bradley

== Coaching staff ==
Position	Staff
Athletic Director	Craig Littlepage
Head coach	George Gelnovatch
Associate head coach	Matt Chulis
Associate head coach	Terry Boss
Operations Assistant	A.J. Barnold

== Schedule ==
Date Time, TV	Rank^{#}	Opponent^{#}	Result	Record	Site (Attendance) City, State
Exhibition
August 12*; 7:00 pm	No. 13	Wright State	Cancelled	- (-)	Klöckner Stadium; Charlottesville, VA
August 15*; 6:00 pm	No. 13	Old Dominion	L 0-1	- (-)	Klöckner Stadium; Charlottesville, VA
August 19*; 1:00 pm	No. 13	at Georgetown	L 1-2	- (-)	Shaw Field; Washington, D.C.
Regular season
August 25*; 7:00 pm	No. 13	Villanova	W 3-2 ^{2OT}	1-0-0 (0-0-0)	Klöckner Stadium (3,594); Charlottesville, VA
August 31*; 6:00 pm	No. 12	Hofstra	W 4-0	2-0-0 (0-0-0)	Klöckner Stadium (1,588); Charlottesville, VA
September 4*; 7:00 pm	No. 12	UNC Wilmington	W 2-1 ^{OT}	3-0-0 (0-0-0)	Klöckner Stadium (1,651); Charlottesville, VA
September 8; 7:00 pm	No. 11	No. 7 Syracuse	T 2-2 ^{2OT}	3-0-1 (0-0-1)	Klöckner Stadium (2,596); Charlottesville, VA
September 12*; 7:00 pm	No. 11	Marquette	W 2-0	4-0-1 (0-0-1)	Klöckner Stadium (1,209); Charlottesville, VA
September 15; 7:00 pm	No. 12	at Virginia Tech; Commonwealth Cup	W 2-1	5-0-1 (1-0-1)	Sandra D. Thompson Field (2,143); Blacksburg, VA
September 22; 7:00 pm	No. 9	No. 7 North Carolina; South's Oldest Rivalry	L 1-2 ^{OT}	5-1-1 (1-1-1)	Klöckner Stadium (4,205); Charlottesville, VA
September 25*; 7:00 pm	No. 9	Davidson	W 2–1	6-1-1 (1-1-1)	Klöckner Stadium (1,056); Charlottesville, VA
September 29; 7:30 pm	No. 10	at No. 7 Notre Dame	T 1-1 ^{2OT}	6-1-2 (1-1-2)	Alumni Field (2,158); South Bend, IN
October 2*; 7:00 pm	No. 10	Portland	W 2-1 ^{OT}	7-1-2 (1-1-2)	Klöckner Stadium (1,319); Charlottesville, VA
October 6; 7:00 pm	No. 11	Boston College	W 1-0	8-1-2 (2-1-2)	Klöckner Stadium (1,781); Charlottesville, VA
October 10*; 7:00 pm	No. 10	Lehigh	W 4-2	9-1-2 (2-1-2)	Klöckner Stadium (1,265); Charlottesville, VA
October 13; 7:00 pm	No. 10	at NC State	T 0-0 ^{2OT}	9-1-3 (2-1-3)	Dail Soccer Stadium (956); Raleigh, NC
October 17*; 7:00 pm	No. 10	Radford	L 0-1	9-2-3 (2-1-3)	Klöckner Stadium (1,356); Charlottesville, VA
October 20; 7:00 pm	No. 10	Pittsburgh	W 2-1 ^{2OT}	10-2-3 (3-1-3)	Klöckner Stadium (3,450); Charlottesville, VA
October 27; 7:00 pm	No. 13	at No. 18 Duke	L 0-1	10-3-3 (3-2-3)	Koskinen Stadium (905); Durham, NC
ACC Tournament
November 1; 7:00 pm	No. 16	Boston College; First Round	W 4-0	11-3-3 (3-2-3)	Klöckner Stadium (536); Charlottesville, VA
November 5; 1:00 pm	No. 16	at No. 6 Louisville; Quarterfinals	T 0-0 (4–3 PK) ^{2OT}	11-3-4 (3-2-3)	Lynn Stadium (738); Louisville, KY
November 8; 7:00 pm	No. 17	No. 13 Notre Dame; Semifinals	W 2-1	12-3-4 (3-2-3)	Klöckner Stadium (1142); Charlottesville, VA
November 12; 12:00 pm, ESPN3	No. 17	vs. No. 1 Wake Forest; Championship	T 0-0 (3-4 PK) ^{2OT}	13-3-5 (3-2-3)	MUSC Health Stadium (1,174); Charleston, SC
NCAA Tournament
November 19; 5:00 pm, ESPN3	No. 8	Fordham; Second Round	L 0-1	13-4-5	Klöckner Stadium (949); Charlottesville, VA
*Non-conference game. ^{#}Rankings from United Soccer Coaches. (#) Tournament seedings in parentheses.

== Awards and honors ==
Recipient	Award	Date	Ref.
Edward Opoku	ACC Offensive Player of the Week	September 19	
Sergi Nus	ACC Defensive Player of the Week	October 9	
Jean-Christophe Koffi	All ACC First Team	November 7	
Pablo Aguilar	All ACC Second Team	November 7	
Jeff Caldwell	All ACC Second Team	November 7	
Edward Opoku	All ACC Second Team	November 7	
Sergi Nus	All ACC Third Team	November 7	
Joe Bell	All ACC Freshman Team	November 7	
Jeffrey Farina	All ACC Third Team	November 7	
Jeff Caldwell	ACC All Tournament Team	November 12	
Pablo Aguilar	ACC All Tournament Team	November 12	
Jean-Christophe Koffi	ACC All Tournament Team	November 12	

== Rankings ==
Ranking movement Legend: ██ Improvement in ranking. ██ Decrease in ranking. ██ Not ranked the previous week. RV=Others receiving votes.
Poll	Pre	Wk 1	Wk 2	Wk 3	Wk 4	Wk 5	Wk 6	Wk 7	Wk 8	Wk 9	Wk 10	Wk 11	Wk 12	Wk 13	Wk 14	Wk 15	Wk 16	Final
United Soccer	13	12	11	12	9	10	11	10	10	13	16	17	8	None Released				19
TopDrawer Soccer	14	14	12	8	4	5	6	5	5	5	11	9	4	12	21	21	21	21

== MLS Draft ==
The following members of the 2017 Virginia Cavaliers men's soccer team were selected in the 2018 MLS SuperDraft.

Player	Round	Pick	Position	MLS club	Ref.
Jeff Caldwell	1	19	GK	New York City FC	
Edward Opoku	2	32	FW	Columbus Crew SC	
Pablo Aguilar	3	59	MF	Houston Dynamo	
Sheldon Sullivan	3	66	DF	Houston Dynamo	
