= 2017 Duke Blue Devils men's soccer team =

American college soccer season

2017 Duke Blue Devils men's soccer

NCAA Tournament, Third Round
- Conference: Atlantic Coast Conference
- U. Soc. Coaches poll: No. 13
- TopDrawerSoccer.com: No. 12
- Record: 13–4–3 (4–3–1 ACC)
- Head coach: John Kerr (10th season)
- Assistant coaches: Michael Brady (10th season); Chris Rich (3rd season)
- Captains: Kevon Black; Cody Brinkman; Markus Fjørtoft; Carter Manley; and Brian White
- Home stadium: Koskinen Stadium

2017 ACC men's soccer standings
| | Conf. | | | | | Overall |
| Team | W | | L | | T | W | | L | | T |
|---|---|---|---|---|---|---|---|---|---|---|
Atlantic
| No. 5 Wake Forest ‡ | 7 | – | 0 | – | 1 | 19 | – | 2 | – | 2 |
| No. 7 Louisville + | 5 | – | 2 | – | 1 | 13 | – | 2 | – | 5 |
| No. 17 Clemson + | 4 | – | 4 | – | 0 | 12 | – | 6 | – | 1 |
| NC State + | 3 | – | 3 | – | 2 | 8 | – | 6 | – | 4 |
| Boston College | 1 | – | 6 | – | 1 | 6 | – | 10 | – | 1 |
| Syracuse | 0 | – | 6 | – | 2 | 6 | – | 8 | – | 4 |
Coastal
| No. 4 North Carolina + | 6 | – | 1 | – | 1 | 17 | – | 4 | – | 1 |
| No. 13 Duke + | 4 | – | 3 | – | 1 | 13 | – | 4 | – | 3 |
| No. 19 Virginia + | 3 | – | 2 | – | 3 | 13 | – | 4 | – | 5 |
| No. 18 Notre Dame + | 3 | – | 3 | – | 2 | 11 | – | 7 | – | 2 |
| Virginia Tech + | 3 | – | 5 | – | 0 | 10 | – | 10 | – | 0 |
| Pittsburgh | 2 | – | 6 | – | 0 | 8 | – | 10 | – | 0 |
‡ – 2017 ACC Tournament champion + – Invited to the 2017 NCAA Division I Men's Soccer Championship; As of December 13, 2017; Rankings from United Soccer Coaches

The 2017 Duke Blue Devils men's soccer team represented Duke University during the 2017 NCAA Division I men's soccer season. The Blue Devils were led by head coach John Kerr, in his tenth season. They played home games at Koskinen Stadium. The team played in the Atlantic Coast Conference.

== Roster ==
Updated August 28, 2017

Note: Flags indicate national team as defined under FIFA eligibility rules; some limited exceptions apply. Players may hold more than one non-FIFA nationality.

| No. | Pos. | Nation | Player |
|---|---|---|---|
| 0 | GK | (United States) USA | Erik Hanson |
| 00 | GK | (United States) USA | Michael Ries |
| 1 | GK | (United States) USA | Will Pulisic |
| 2 | DF | (United States) USA | Carter Manley (captain) |
| 3 | DF | (Canada) CAN | Oliver Spring |
| 4 | DF | (Canada) CAN | Kevon Black (captain) |
| 5 | DF | (United States) USA | CC Uche |
| 6 | MF | (United States) USA | Cameron Moseley |
| 7 | MF | (Denmark) DEN | Torbjørn Alseth |
| 8 | MF | (Scotland) SCO | Ciaran McKenna |
| 9 | MF | (Italy) ITA | Daniele Proch |
| 10 | FW | (United States) USA | Suniel Veerakone |
| 11 | DF | (Austria) AUT | Max Moser |
| 12 | MF | (United States) USA | Colby Agu |
| 13 | MF | (United States) USA | Noah Snyder |
| 14 | MF | (Iceland) ISL | Kristófer Garðarsson |

| No. | Pos. | Nation | Player |
|---|---|---|---|
| 15 | MF | (Peru) PER | Miguel Yzaga |
| 16 | FW | (United States) USA | Daniel Wright |
| 17 | MF | (United States) USA | Bryson Asher |
| 18 | DF | (Austria) AUT | Matthias Frick |
| 19 | MF | (United States) USA | Brandon Williamson |
| 21 | DF | (Norway) NOR | Markus Fjørtoft (captain) |
| 22 | DF | (United States) USA | Henry Booth |
| 23 | MF | (Argentina) ARG | Micolas Macri |
| 24 | MF | (United States) USA | Brian White (captain) |
| 25 | MF | (United States) USA | Cody Brinkman (captain) |
| 26 | DF | (United States) USA | Max Feldman |
| 27 | DF | (United States) USA | Wilhelm Jacques |
| 28 | MF | (United States) USA | Jack Doran |
| 29 | DF | (United States) USA | Stephen O'Connell |
| 30 | GK | (United States) USA | Joe Ohaus |

Duke named the five captains listed above prior to the season.

== Coaching staff ==
| Position | Staff |
|---|---|
| Athletic director | (United States) Kevin White |
| Head coach | (Canada) John Kerr |
| Associate head coach | (England) Michael Brady |
| Assistant coach and recruiting coordinator | (United States) Chris Rich |
| Volunteer Assistant coach | (England) Kieran Hall |
| Volunteer Director of Operations | (United States) Noah McKonon |
| Volunteer Director of Operations | (United States) Sonny Mukungu |

== Schedule ==
| Date Time, TV | Rank^{#} | Opponent^{#} | Result | Record | Site (Attendance) City, State |
Exhibition
| August 13*; 7:00 pm | | South Carolina | W 2-0 | - (-) | Koskinen Stadium (0); Durham, NC |
| August 17*; 7:00 pm | | vs. Xavier; Shindigz National Soccer Festival | T 1-1 | - (-) | Bishop D'Arcy Stadium; Fort Wayne, IN |
| August 19*; 7:00 pm | | vs. No. 7 Indiana; Shindigz National Soccer Festival | T 1-1 | - (-) | Bishop D'Arcy Stadium; Fort Wayne, IN |
Regular season
| August 25*; 7:30 pm | | UCF; John Rennie Nike Invitational | W 2-0 | 1-0-0 (0-0-0) | Koskinen Stadium (1,725); Durham, NC |
| August 27*; 2:30 pm | | Fordham; John Rennie Nike Invitational | W 3-0 | 2-0-0 (0-0-0) | Koskinen Stadium (582); Durham, NC |
| September 1*; 2:00 pm | | High Point | W 3-2 ^{OT} | 3-0-0 (0-0-0) | Koskinen Stadium (405); Durham, NC |
| September 5*; 7:00 pm | | Presbyterian | T 1-1 | 3-0-1 (0-0-0) | Koskinen Stadium (345); Durham, NC |
| September 8; 7:00 pm | | Virginia Tech | W 3-1 | 4-0-1 (1-0-0) | Koskinen Stadium (825); Durham, NC |
| September 16; 7:00 pm | No. 23 | vs. No. 8 North Carolina; Rivalry | L 1-2 | 4-1-1 (1-1-0) | Bryan Park (3,002); Greensboro, NC |
| September 19; 7:00 pm | | Wisconsin | W 4-3 | 5-1-1 (1-1-0) | Koskinen Stadium (471); Durham, NC |
| September 22; 7:00 pm | | at No. 11 Syracuse | W 2-1 | 6-1-1 (2-1-0) | SU Soccer Stadium (2,022); Syracuse, NY |
| September 26*; 7:00 pm | No. 19 | Appalachian State | W 1-0 | 7-1-1 (2-1-0) | Koskinen Stadium (522); Durham, NC |
| September 30; 7:00 pm | No. 19 | No. 8 Louisville | L 0-1 | 7-2-1 (2-2-0) | Koskinen Stadium (1,103); Durham, NC |
| October 3*; 7:00 pm | No. 19 | Elon | W 1-0 | 8-2-1 (2-2-0) | Koskinen Stadium (543); Durham, NC |
| October 6; 7:00 pm | No. 19 | at Pittsburgh | W 2-0 | 9-2-1 (3-2-0) | Ambrose Urbanic Field (623); Pittsburgh, PA |
| October 9*; 1:00 pm | No. 19 | at No. 10 Georgetown | W 2-1 | 10-2-1 (3-2-0) | Shaw Field (497); Washington, D.C. |
| October 13; 7:00 pm | No. 16 | No. 11 Clemson | L 1-4 | 10-3-1 (3-3-0) | Koskinen Stadium (758); Durham, NC |
| October 20; 7:00 pm | No. 15 | at No. 12 Notre Dame | T 0-0 ^{2OT} | 10-3-2 (3-3-1) | Alumni Stadium (1,703); Notre Dame, IN |
| October 24*; 7:00 pm | No. 18 | Delaware | W 2-1 | 11-3-2 (3-3-1) | Koskinen Stadium (331); Durham, NC |
| October 27; 7:00 pm | No. 18 | No. 13 Virginia; Senior Night | W 1-0 | 12-3-2 (4-3-1) | Koskinen Stadium (905); Durham, NC |
ACC Tournament
| November 5; 1:00 pm | No. 11 | No. 9 Clemson; Quarterfinal | L 0-1 | 12-4-2 (4-3-1) | Koskinen Stadium (468); Durham, NC |
NCAA Tournament
| November 19; 6:00 pm | No. 14 | No. 13 FIU; Second Round | W 2-1 | 13-4-2 | Koskinen Stadium (532); Durham, NC |
| November 25; 6:00 pm | No. 14 | Fordham; Third Round | T 2-2 (7–8 PK) ^{2OT} | 13-4-3 | Koskinen Stadium (494); Durham, NC |
*Non-conference game. ^{#}Rankings from United Soccer Coaches. (#) Tournament seedings in parentheses.

== Awards and honors ==
| Recipient | Award | Date | Ref. |
|---|---|---|---|
| Will Pulisic | ACC Defensive Player of the Week | October 23 | |
| Daniel Wright | ACC Offensive Player of the Week | October 30 | |
| Brian White | All-ACC Second Team | November 7 | |
| Markus Fjørtoft | All-ACC Third Team | November 7 | |
| Carter Manley | All-ACC Third Team | November 7 | |
| Will Pulisic | All-ACC Third Team | November 7 | |
| Will Pulisic | ACC All Freshman Team | November 7 | |
| Brian White | United Soccer Coaches Third Team All-American | December 7 | |
| Brian White | Soccer American Third Team All-American | December 8 | |

== Rankings ==
Ranking movement Legend: ██ Improvement in ranking. ██ Decrease in ranking. ██ Not ranked the previous week. RV=Others receiving votes.
| Poll | Pre | Wk 1 | Wk 2 | Wk 3 | Wk 4 | Wk 5 | Wk 6 | Wk 7 | Wk 8 | Wk 9 | Wk 10 | Wk 11 | Wk 12 | Wk 13 | Wk 14 | Wk 15 | Wk 16 | Final |
|---|---|---|---|---|---|---|---|---|---|---|---|---|---|---|---|---|---|---|
| United Soccer Coaches | | RV | RV | 23 | RV | 19 | 19 | 16 | 15 | 18 | 11 | 16 | 14 | None Released | | | | 13 |
| TopDrawer Soccer | | | 19 | 16 | 15 | 17 | 10 | 11 | 11 | 13 | 17 | 8 | 11 | 11 | 9 | 12 | 12 | 12 |

== MLS Draft ==
The following members of the 2017 Duke Blue Devils men's soccer team were selected in the 2018 MLS SuperDraft.

| Player | Round | Pick | Position | MLS club | Ref. |
|---|---|---|---|---|---|
| Brian White | 1 | 16 | MF | New York Red Bulls | |
| Carter Manley | 1 | 23 | DF | Minnesota United | |
| Markus Fjørtoft | 2 | 45 | DF | Seattle Sounders | |
