= George Kiefer (soccer) =

American soccer coach (born 1971)

Current position
- Title: Head coach
- Team: South Florida
- Conference: AAC
- Record: 162–86–51 (.627)

Biographical details
- Born: October 11, 1971 (age 55); Bay Shore, New York
- Education: Southern Connecticut

Playing career
- 1990–1993: Southern Connecticut
- 1994–1995: Connecticut Wolves

Coaching career (HC unless noted)
- 1995–1996: Southern Connecticut (assistant)
- 1997–2001: Connecticut (assistant)
- 2002–2016: South Florida
- 2017–2023: NC State
- 2024–2025: Grand Canyon
- 2026–present: South Florida

Head coaching record
- Overall: 230–151–82 (.585)
- Tournaments: 9–12–5 (.442)

Accomplishments and honors

Championships
- 2005 Big East Division Champions; 2008 Big East Tournament Champions; 2011 Big East Division Champions; 2013 American Tournament Champions; 2025 WAC Tournament Champions

Awards
- 2005 NSCAA Regional Coach of the Year; 2015 NSCAA Regional Coach of the Year

George Kiefer (born October 11, 1971) is a former college and professional soccer player and current college soccer coach, now leading the South Florida Bulls men's soccer team in his second tenure after being named head coach in 2025. Previously, Kiefer was the head coach at Grand Canyon. Before his rehiring, Kiefer spent 15 seasons at head coach head coach for South Florida. He was also the head coach for NC State for seven seasons. As a head coach, Kiefer has led his teams to 13 NCAA tournaments.

== Playing career ==
Kiefer played four years of college soccer under coach Ray Reid at Southern Connecticut from 1990 to 1993.

He appeared in 48 career games, scoring eight goals and assisting on 12 more for 28 points.

While a member of the Owls program, Kiefer's teams went 74–8–8 (.867) and claimed two NCAA Division II national championships.

Kiefer played professionally for the Connecticut Wolves in 1994 and 1995.

== Coaching career ==
Kiefer began his coaching career as an assistant coach at his alma mater Southern Connecticut for two seasons before following Ray Reid to UConn. In seven seasons assisting Reid, Kiefer helped lead teams to a 123–26–8 (.809) record. UConn made four consecutive NCAA tournament appearances from 1998 to 2001.

Kiefer earned his first head coaching opportunity at South Florida, beginning a 15-year run leading the Bulls in 2002. Kiefer was the 2005 NSCAA South Region Coach of the Year. He posted a 162–84–47 record as head coach and won five conference championships. His Bulls reached the Elite Eight twice.

Prior to the 2017 season, Kiefer was selected to replace Kelly Findley as the NC State Wolfpack head coach. He led the Wolfpack to NCAA tournament appearances in his first three seasons.

NC State and Kiefer mutually agreed to part ways following the 2023 season.

Kiefer was announced as the head coach at Grand Canyon on Dec. 20, 2023.

Kiefer quickly had Grand Canyon back in the NCAA Tournament in his second season leading the program, winning the 2025 WAC men's soccer tournament. Later that season, Kiefer helped the Lopes advance in the NCAA Tournament for the first time in Division I program history (winning at UCLA in penalty kicks) and win their first NCAA Tournament match (at San Diego).

== Head coaching record ==
Record table
Season	Team	Overall	Conference	Standing	Postseason
South Florida Bulls (Conference USA/Big East/American Athletic Conference) (2002–2016)
2002	South Florida	11–7	6–4		
2003	South Florida	7–8–3	6–4		
2004	South Florida	10–5–2	5–3–1		
2005	South Florida	13–6–2	9–2–0		NCAA second round
2006	South Florida	9–6–4	4–3–4		
2007	South Florida	14–6–2	6–4–1		NCAA regional semifinals
2008	South Florida	15–5–3	7–3–1		NCAA Regional finals
2009	South Florida	14–4–3	6–3–2		NCAA second round
2010	South Florida	9–6–4	4–3–2		NCAA first round
2011	South Florida	13–4–4	7–1–2		NCAA Regional finals
2012	South Florida	8–6–5	2–3–3		NCAA second round
2013	South Florida	8–4–9	2–2–4		NCAA first round
2014	South Florida	10–7–3	4–3–1		
2015	South Florida	11–6–3	5–1–2	2nd	NCAA second round
2016	South Florida	10–6–4	6–1–0	1st	NCAA first round
South Florida:		162–86–51	79–40–23		
NC State Wolfpack (ACC) (2017–2023)
2017	NC State	8–6–4	3–3–2	8th	NCAA first round
2018	NC State	10–7–3	2–4–2	8th	NCAA second round
2019	NC State	9–7–3	3–4–1	5th	NCAA first round
2020	NC State	3–8–4	1–7–4	4th (Atlantic)	
2021	NC State	7–8–2	1–5–2	6th (Atlantic)	
2022	NC State	6–7–5	1–5–2	6th (Atlantic)	
2023	NC State	6–9–3	1–5–3	6th (Atlantic)	
NC State:		49–52–24	12–33–16		
Grand Canyon (WAC) (2024–2025)
2024	Grand Canyon	5–10–3	2–6–1	9th	
2025	Grand Canyon	14–3–5	3–1–3	t-2nd	NCAA third round
Grand Canyon:		19–13–8	5–7–4		
Total:		230–151–82 (.585)			
National champion Postseason invitational champion Conference regular season champion Conference regular season and conference tournament champion Division regular season champion Division regular season and conference tournament champion Conference tournament champion
