= 2017 Wake Forest Demon Deacons men's soccer team =

American college soccer season

2017 Wake Forest Demon Deacons men's soccer

ACC Regular Season Champions ACC Tournament Champions

NCAA Tournament, Quarterfinals
- Conference: Atlantic Coast Conference
- U. Soc. Coaches poll: No. 5
- TopDrawerSoccer.com: No. 5
- Record: 19–2–2 (7–0–1 ACC)
- Head coach: Bobby Muuss (3rd season)
- Assistant coaches: Steve Armas (3rd season); Dane Brenner (7th season)
- Captains: Kevin Politz; Jon Bakero; Steven Echevarria
- Home stadium: Spry Stadium

2017 ACC men's soccer standings
| | Conf. | | | | | Overall |
| Team | W | | L | | T | W | | L | | T |
|---|---|---|---|---|---|---|---|---|---|---|
Atlantic
| No. 5 Wake Forest ‡ | 7 | – | 0 | – | 1 | 19 | – | 2 | – | 2 |
| No. 7 Louisville + | 5 | – | 2 | – | 1 | 13 | – | 2 | – | 5 |
| No. 17 Clemson + | 4 | – | 4 | – | 0 | 12 | – | 6 | – | 1 |
| NC State + | 3 | – | 3 | – | 2 | 8 | – | 6 | – | 4 |
| Boston College | 1 | – | 6 | – | 1 | 6 | – | 10 | – | 1 |
| Syracuse | 0 | – | 6 | – | 2 | 6 | – | 8 | – | 4 |
Coastal
| No. 4 North Carolina + | 6 | – | 1 | – | 1 | 17 | – | 4 | – | 1 |
| No. 13 Duke + | 4 | – | 3 | – | 1 | 13 | – | 4 | – | 3 |
| No. 19 Virginia + | 3 | – | 2 | – | 3 | 13 | – | 4 | – | 5 |
| No. 18 Notre Dame + | 3 | – | 3 | – | 2 | 11 | – | 7 | – | 2 |
| Virginia Tech + | 3 | – | 5 | – | 0 | 10 | – | 10 | – | 0 |
| Pittsburgh | 2 | – | 6 | – | 0 | 8 | – | 10 | – | 0 |
‡ – 2017 ACC Tournament champion + – Invited to the 2017 NCAA Division I Men's Soccer Championship; As of December 13, 2017; Rankings from United Soccer Coaches

The 2017 Wake Forest Demon Deacons men's soccer team represented Wake Forest University during the 2017 NCAA Division I men's soccer season. It was the 71st season of the university fielding a program. It was the program's third season with Bobby Muuss as head coach. The Demon Deacons played their home matches at Spry Stadium.

== Roster ==
Updated:August 28, 2017

Note: Flags indicate national team as defined under FIFA eligibility rules; some limited exceptions apply. Players may hold more than one non-FIFA nationality.

| No. | Pos. | Nation | Player |
|---|---|---|---|
| 0 | GK | USA | Andrew Pannenberg |
| 1 | GK | ESP | Andrew Cases Mundet |
| 2 | MF | USA | Luis Argudo |
| 3 | DF | USA | Rafael Fagundo |
| 4 | DF | USA | Kevin Politz (captain) |
| 6 | DF | USA | Mark McKenzie |
| 7 | MF | ESP | Jon Bakero (captain) |
| 8 | MF | USA | Brandon Servania |
| 9 | FW | USA | Tater Rennhack |
| 10 | MF | BRA | Bruno Lapa |
| 11 | MF | JAM | Justin McMaster |
| 12 | MF | USA | Brad Dunwell |

| No. | Pos. | Nation | Player |
|---|---|---|---|
| 14 | MF | JAM | Joey DeZart |
| 15 | MF | USA | Steven Echevarria (captain) |
| 16 | MF | USA | Omir Fernandez |
| 17 | DF | USA | Logan Gdula |
| 19 | DF | USA | Eddie Folds |
| 20 | MF | USA | Kyle McCurley |
| 21 | MF | USA | Machop Chol |
| 22 | MF | GHA | Ema Twumasi |
| 23 | FW | USA | Hank Gauger |
| 26 | DF | USA | Sam Raben |
| 30 | GK | USA | Dominic Peters |
| 31 | GK | USA | Kyle Barkett |

Prior to the season Wake Forest named the three captains shown above.

== Coaching staff ==
| Position | Staff |
|---|---|
| Athletic director | Ron Wellman |
| Head coach | Bobby Muuss |
| Assistant coach | Steve Armas |
| Assistant coach | Dane Brenner |
| Assistant coach | Matt Poplawski |
| Assistant Athletic Trainer | Michael White |
| Academic Counselor | Brooke Taylor |
| Strength & Conditioning Staff | David Bass |

== Schedule ==
| Date Time, TV | Rank^{#} | Opponent^{#} | Result | Record | Site (Attendance) City, State |
Exhibition
| August 13*; 7:00 pm | No. 2 | at Furmam | L 0-1 | - (-) | Stone Stadium (1,019); Greenville, SC |
| August 19*; 7:00 pm | No. 2 | UNC Wilmington | T 2-2 | - (-) | Spry Stadium; Winston-Salem, NC |
Regular season
| August 25*; 7:30 pm | No. 2 | Rutgers | W 5-1 | 1-0-0 (0-0-0) | Spry Stadium (3,882); Winston-Salem, NC |
| August 27*; 6:00 pm | No. 2 | No. 12 Providence | W 4-1 | 2-0-0 (0-0-0) | Spry Stadium (2,597); Winston-Salem, NC |
| September 2*; 8:00 pm | No. 2 | at Saint Louis | W 4-1 | 3-0-0 (0-0-0) | Hermann Stadium (919); St. Louis, MO |
| September 5*; 7:00 pm | No. 2 | Georgia State | L 1-2 ^{OT} | 3-1-0 (0-0-0) | Spry Stadium (1,066); Winston-Salem, NC |
| September 9; 7:00 pm | No. 2 | at No. 8 Louisville | W 3-1 | 4-1-0 (1-0-0) | Lynn Stadium (2,708); Louisville, KY |
| September 12*; 7:00 pm | No. 4 | Appalachian State | W 3-0 | 5-1-0 (1-0-0) | Spry Stadium (1,132); Winston-Salem, NC |
| September 16; 7:30 pm | No. 4 | Pittsburgh | W 2-0 | 6-1-0 (2-0-0) | Spry Stadium (3,207); Winston-Salem, NC |
| September 19*; 7:00 pm | No. 4 | High Point | W 1-0 ^{2OT} | 7-1-0 (2-0-0) | Spry Stadium (1,180); Winston-Salem, NC |
| September 23; 7:00 pm | No. 4 | at NC State | W 3-0 | 8-1-0 (3-0-0) | Dail Soccer Stadium (1,539); Raleigh, NC |
| September 26*; 7:00 pm | No. 2 | South Carolina | W 2-1 | 9-1-0 (3-0-0) | Spry Stadium (1,050); Winston-Salem, NC |
| September 29; 7:00 pm, ESPNU | No. 2 | at No. 6 Clemson | W 3-2 ^{2OT} | 10-1-0 (4-0-0) | Spry Stadium (4,781); Winston-Salem, NC |
| October 6; 7:00 pm | No. 2 | at No. 4 North Carolina | W 2-1 | 11-1-0 (5-0-0) | WakeMed Soccer Park (2,006); Cary, NC |
| October 10*; 7:00 pm | No. 2 | Longwood | W 8-0 | 12-1-0 (5-0-0) | Spry Stadium (1,127); Winston-Salem, NC |
| October 14; 7:30 pm | No. 2 | Virginia Tech | W 3-0 | 13-1-0 (6-0-0) | Spry Stadium (3,846); Winston-Salem, NC |
| October 17*; 7:00 pm | No. 2 | at Elon | W 2-0 | 14-1-0 (6-0-0) | Rudd Field (731); Elon, NC |
| October 21; 7:00 pm | No. 2 | at Boston College | W 4-0 | 15-1-0 (7-0-0) | Newton Soccer Complex (791); Chestnut Hill, MA |
| October 27; 7:00 pm | No. 1 | Syracuse; Senior Night | T 0-0 ^{2OT} | 15-1-1 (7-0-1) | Spry Stadium (4,357); Winston-Salem, NC |
ACC Tournament
| November 5; 1:00 pm | No. 1 | Virginia Tech; Quarterfinal | W 3-0 | 16-1-1 (7-0-1) | Spry Stadium (1,709); Winston-Salem, NC |
| November 8; 7:00 pm | No. 1 | No. 5 Clemson; Semifinal | W 2-1 | 17-1-1 (7-0-1) | Spry Stadium (1,872); Winston-Salem, NC |
| November 12; 12:00 pm | No. 1 | No. 17 Virginia; Final | T 0-0 (4-3 PK) ^{2OT} | 17-1-2 (7-0-1) | MUSC Health Stadium (1,174); Charleston, SC |
NCAA Tournament
| November 19; 5:00 pm | No. 1 | Columbia; Second Round | W 1–0 | 18-1-2 | Spry Stadium (2,037); Winston-Salem, NC |
| November 26; 5:00 pm | No. 1 | No. 19 Butler; Third Round | W 2–0 | 19-1-2 | Spry Stadium (2,413); Winston-Salem, NC |
| December 1; 7:00 pm | No. 1 | No. 3 Stanford; Quarterfinal | L 0–2 | 19-2-2 | Spry Stadium (4,628); Winston-Salem, NC |
*Non-conference game. ^{#}Rankings from United Soccer Coaches. (#) Tournament seedings in parentheses.

== Awards and honors ==
| Recipient | Award | Date | Ref. |
|---|---|---|---|
| Brandon Servania | ACC Co-Offensive Player of the Week | August 28 | |
| Ema Twumasi | ACC Offensive Player of the Week | October 2 | |
| Bobby Muuss | ACC Coach of the Year | November 7 | |
| Jon Bakero | ACC Offensive Player of the Year | November 7 | |
| Kevin Politz | Defensive Player of the Year | November 7 | |
| Jon Bakero | All-ACC First Team | November 7 | |
| Ema Twumasi | All-ACC First Team | November 7 | |
| Kevin Politz | All-ACC Second Team | November 7 | |
| Luis Argudo | All-ACC Third Team | November 7 | |
| Brad Dunwell | All-ACC Third Team | November 7 | |
| Jon Bakero | ACC All Tournament Team | November 12 | |
| Michael DeShields | ACC All Tournament Team | November 12 | |
| Mark McKenzie | ACC All Tournament Team | November 12 | |
| Andreu Cases Mundet | ACC All Tournament Team | November 12 | |
| Jon Bakero | United Soccer Coaches All-American First Team | December 7 | |
| Jon Bakero | Soccer America All-American First Team | December 8 | |
| Jon Bakero | College Soccer News All-American First Team | January 4 | |
| Kevin Politz | United Soccer Coaches All-American Second Team | December 7 | |
| Kevin Politz | Soccer America All-American Third Team | December 8 | |
| Kevin Politz | College Soccer News All-American Third Team | January 4 | |

== Rankings ==
Ranking movement Legend: ██ Improvement in ranking. ██ Decrease in ranking. ██ Not ranked the previous week. RV=Others receiving votes.
| Poll | Pre | Wk 1 | Wk 2 | Wk 3 | Wk 4 | Wk 5 | Wk 6 | Wk 7 | Wk 8 | Wk 9 | Wk 10 | Wk 11 | Wk 12 | Wk 13 | Wk 14 | Wk 15 | Wk 16 | Final |
|---|---|---|---|---|---|---|---|---|---|---|---|---|---|---|---|---|---|---|
| United Soccer | 2 | 2 | 2 | 4 | 4 | 2 | 2 | 2 | 2 | 1 | 1 | 1 | 1 | None Released | | | | 5 |
| TopDrawer Soccer | 3 | 3 | 3 | 3 | 6 | 7 | 4 | 4 | 3 | 3 | 1 | 1 | 1 | 1 | 1 | 1 | 5 | 5 |

== MLS Draft ==
The following members of the 2017 Wake Forest Demon Deacons men's soccer team were selected in the 2018 MLS SuperDraft.

| Player | Round | Pick | Position | MLS club | Ref. |
|---|---|---|---|---|---|
| Jon Bakero | 1 | 5 | FW | Chicago Fire | |
| Ema Twumasi | 1 | 11 | MF | FC Dallas | |
| Luis Argudo | 3 | 67 | MF | Columbus Crew | |
