= Sandra D. Thompson Field =

Stadium in Blacksburg, Virginia

Coordinates: 37.219987°N 80.421784°W

Thompson Field
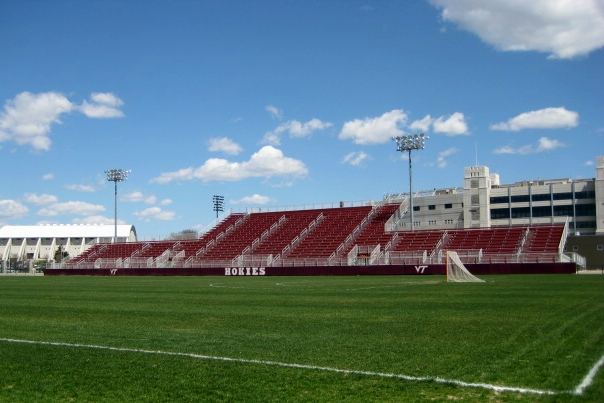
- View of the stadium in 2008
- Interactive map of Thompson Field
- Full name: Sandra D. Thompson Field
- Address: Blacksburg, VA; United States
- Owner: Virginia Tech
- Operator: Virginia Tech Athletics
- Capacity: 3,500
- Type: Stadium
- Field size: 110 x 68 m
- Current use: Soccer; Lacrosse

Tenants
- Virginia Tech Hokies (NCAA) teams: men's and women's soccer; men's and women's lacrosse

Website
- hokiesports.com/thompson-field

Sandra D. Thompson Field (or simply Thompson Field) is a stadium located on the campus of Virginia Tech in Blacksburg, Virginia where it is home to the Hokies soccer and lacrosse teams.

Built in 2003, the stadium seats 2,500 people and features a regulation size auxiliary field.
