= 2017 Mid-American Conference men's soccer season =

Mid-American Conference
- Season: 2017
- Champions: Western Michigan
- MAC Tourney Winner: Akron
- NCAA tournament: Akron, Western Michigan
- Matches: 91
- Goals: 154 (1.69 per match)
- Top goalscorer: 12 goals Brandon Bye (WMU)
- Biggest home win: WMU 5–0 Stetson (08/27); Akron 5–0 UMass Lowell (09/24)
- Biggest away win: WMU 5–0 @ NIU (10/14)
- Highest scoring: Sacramento State 4–3 NIU @ Utah Valley (09/16)
- Longest winning run: 10 games Akron (since 10/10)
- Longest unbeaten run: 10 games Akron (10/10–current); Western Michigan (08/2–09/29)
- Longest winless run: 7 games Northern Illinois (09/17–current)
- Longest losing run: 4 games Bowling Green (09/13–09/27); Northern Illinois (09/17–10/03 & 10/14–current)
- Highest attendance: 4,351; Akron @ Utah Valley (08/25)
- Lowest attendance: 0 West Virginia @ Cal (08/25) (probably incorrect)
- Average attendance: 801 (probably incorrect)
- All statistics correct as of November 14, 2017.

2017 Mid-American Conference men's soccer standings
	Conf.					Overall
Team	W		L		T	W		L		T
No. 9 Western Michigan +	5	–	0	–	0	17	–	4	–	1
No. 3 Akron ‡	4	–	1	–	0	18	–	4	–	2
SIU Edwardsville	2	–	3	–	0	7	–	10	–	1
West Virginia	1	–	2	–	2	9	–	6	–	4
Bowling Green	1	–	3	–	1	7	–	9	–	1
Northern Illinois	0	–	4	–	1	3	–	11	–	1
‡ – 2017 MAC Tournament champion + – Invited to the 2017 NCAA Division I Men's Soccer Championship; As of December 13, 2017; Rankings from United Soccer Coaches

The 2017 Mid-American Conference men's soccer season was the 25th season of men's varsity soccer in the conference.

With their win over SIUE on October 28, the Western Michigan Broncos won their first-ever MAC regular season title. The Broncos went undefeated (5–0–0) during the regular season and did not allow a goal in conference play. Akron defeated Western Michigan, 3–1, to win the MAC tournament.

== Changes from 2016 ==
Buffalo announced the discontinuation of men's soccer and three other sports for financial reasons on April 3, 2017.

The Mid-American Conference (MAC) announced on June 2, 2017, that the Southern Illinois University Edwardsville Cougars men's soccer and wrestling teams would become affiliate members of the MAC beginning in the 2018 season. On June 8, it was announced that the soccer team would make the move for the 2017 season.

== Teams ==
Team	Location	Stadium	Capacity	Coach	Uniforms supplier
Akron Zips	Akron, Ohio	FirstEnergy Stadium-Cub Cadet Field	4,000	(United States) Jared Embick	(Germany) adidas
Bowling Green Falcons	Bowling Green, Ohio	Cochrane Stadium	1,000	(United States) Eric Nichols	(United States) Nike
Northern Illinois Huskies	DeKalb, Illinois	NIU Soccer and Track & Field Complex	1,500	(Scotland) Ryan Swan	(Germany) adidas
SIU Edwardsville Cougars	Edwardsville, Illinois	Ralph Korte Stadium	4,000	(United States) Mario Sanchez	(Germany) adidas
West Virginia Mountaineers	Morgantown, West Virginia	Dlesk Stadium	1,600	(United States) Marlon LeBlanc	(United States) Nike
Western Michigan Broncos	Kalamazoo, Michigan	WMU Soccer Complex	500	(United States) Chad Wiseman	(Germany) adidas

== Season outlook ==
The MAC in the national preseason polls:

United Soccer Coaches (formerly NSCAA) – Akron #16

College Soccer News – Akron #18, SIU Edwardsville #21

Top Drawer Soccer – Akron #13

Soccer America – Akron #13

Hero Sports – Akron #20

2017 Preseason MAC Coaches' Poll

Source=

Place	School	Points (1st Place votes)
1	Akron	35 (5)
2 (tie)	West Virginia	21 (1)
	SIU Edwardsville	21
4 (tie)	Bowling Green	20
	Western Michigan	20
6	Northern Illinois	9

== Regular season ==
=== Rankings ===
==== United Soccer Coaches National ====
Source =

Legend
Increase in ranking
Decrease in ranking
Not ranked previous week or no change

		Pre	Wk 1	Wk 2	Wk 3	Wk 4	Wk 5	Wk 6	Wk 7	Wk 8	Wk 9	Wk 10	Wk 11	Wk 12	Final
Akron	C	16	24	rv	rv	—	rv	rv	rv	19	14	10	7	4	3
Bowling Green	C	—	—	rv	19	—	—	—	—	—	—	—	—	—	
Northern Illinois	C	—	—	—	—	—	—	—	—	—	—	—	—	—	
SIU Edwardsville	C	—	—	—	—	—	—	—	—	—	—	—	—	—	
West Virginia	C	—	19	14	rv	rv	rv	—	—	—	—	—	—	—	
Western Michigan	C	—	rv	—	24	12	9	12	13	8	6	5	4	6	9

==== United Soccer Coaches Great Lakes Regional ====
Source =

		Wk 1	Wk 2	Wk 3	Wk 4	Wk 5	Wk 6	Wk 7	Wk 8	Wk 9	Wk 10	Wk 11	Wk 12
Akron	C	8	8	9	8	7	4	4	3	3	2	2	1
Bowling Green	C	6	4	2	5	—	—	—	—	—	—	—	—
Northern Illinois	C	—	—	—	—	—	—	—	—	—	—	—	—
SIU Edwardsville	C	—	—	—	—	—	—	—	—	—	—	—	—
West Virginia	C	1	1	4	6	5	8	9	7	8	—	7	7
Western Michigan	C	3	7	3	1	1	2	2	1	1	1	1	2

==== NCAA RPI ====
Source =

	Wk 6	Wk 7	Wk 8	Wk 9	Wk 10	Wk 11	Wk 12	Final
Akron	24	25	23	14	9	10	7	6
Bowling Green	80	100	133	135	156	152	157	157
Northern Illinois	150	166	153	164	175	167	166	169
SIU Edwardsville	187	142	115	138	135	135	135	135
West Virginia	62	73	47	58	57	54	55	56
Western Michigan	11	9	11	6	8	8	8	9

=== MAC Players of the Week ===
Date	Player of the Week	Class	Position	School
August 29	Jad Arslan ^{#}	Senior	Midfielder	West Virginia
September 5	Anthony Mwembia	Sophomore	Goalkeeper	Bowling Green
September 12	Brandon Bye * ^{#}	Senior	Midfielder	Western Michigan
September 19	Albert Andres-Llop	Sophomore	Defender	West Virginia
September 26	Sam Gainford	Senior	Forward	Akron
October 3	Nate Shultz * ^{#}	Senior	Defender	Akron
October 10	Elijah Michaels ^{#} Jorge Gonzalez	R-Junior; Sophomore	Goalkeeper; Midfielder	Western Michigan; SIUE
October 17	Skye Harter * ^{#}	R-Sophomore	Midfielder	Akron
October 24	Brandon Bye * ^{#} Sam Gainford ^{#}	Senior; Senior	Midfielder; Forward	Western Michigan; Akron
October 31	Stuart Holthusen * ^{#} †	Senior	Forward	Akron
November 7	Stuart Holthusen * ^{#}	Senior	Forward	Akron

NOTES:

- * = Players were also named to the College Soccer News National Team of the Week for that week.
- * = Players were also named to the TopDrawerSoccer.com National Team of the Week for that week.
- † = Stuart Holthusen was not only named the MAC Player of the Week. On Tuesday, October 31, he was selected as the United Soccer Coaches Division I National Player of the Week.

== Postseason ==
=== MAC tournament ===
The 2017 MAC tournament was played November 10 and 12 on the campus of the regular season champion Western Michigan Broncos. Akron beat Western Michigan in the final 3–1,

1st seed – Western Michigan Broncos (15–2–1; 5–0–0 MAC)

2nd seed – Akron Zips (14–3–1; 4–1–0 MAC)

3rd seed – SIUE Cougars (7–9–1; 2–3–0 MAC)

4th seed – West Virginia Mountaineers (9–5–4; 1–2–2 MAC)

=== NCAA tournament ===
Seed	Region	School	1st round	2nd round	3rd round	Quarterfinals	Semifinals	Championship
5	2	Akron	Bye	W, 3–0 vs. Seattle (Akron)	W, 3–2^{(OT)} vs. Wisconsin (Akron)	D 0–0 ^{(PK 4–3)} vs. Louisville (Louisville)	L, 0–2 vs. Stanford (Chester, PA)	—
10	4	Western Michigan	Bye	W, 2–0 vs. Albany (Kalamazoo)	L, 1–2 vs. Michigan State (East Lansing)	—	—	—

=== 2018 MLS SuperDraft ===
Round	Pick #	MLS team	Player	Position	College	Other
1	1	Los Angeles FC	João Moutinho	DF	Akron	Generation adidas
1	8	New England Revolution	Brandon Bye	DF	Western Michigan	
2	31	New York Red Bulls	Niko de Vera	DF	Akron	
2	46	Toronto FC	Drew Shepherd	GK	Western Michigan	
3	48	LA Galaxy	Nate Schulz	DF	Akron	
3	64	Portland Timbers	Stuart Holthusen	F	Akron	

== Honors ==
=== 2017 United Soccer Coaches NCAA Division I Men's All-American teams ===
Player	School	Position	Class	Hometown
First Team
João Moutinho	Akron	Defender	Freshman	Lisbon, Portugal
Brandon Bye	Western Michigan	Forward	Senior	Portage, Mich
Second Team
Drew Shepard	Western Michigan	Goalkeeper	Senior	Ann Arbor, Michigan

=== 2017 United Soccer Coaches NCAA Division I Men's All-Great Lakes Region teams ===
Player	School	Position	Class	Hometown
First Team
Zach Bock	Western Michigan	Defender	Seniorr	Novi, Michigan
João Moutinho	Akron	Defender	Freshman	Lisbon, Portugal
Brandon Bye	Western Michigan	Forward	Senior	Portage, Mich
Second Team
Drew Shepard	Western Michigan	Goalkeeper	Senior	Ann Arbor, Michigan
Nate Shultz	Akron	Defender	Senior	Mayfield, Ohio
Sam Gainford	Akron	Forward	Senior	Liverpool, England
Stuart Holthusen	Akron	Forward	Senior	Auckland, New Zealand
Third Team
Tommy Clark	Western Michigan	Midfielder	Junior	South Bend, Indiana

=== 2017 CoSIDA Academic All-America teams ===
==== Second team ====
Zach Bock, Western Michigan University, Senior, 3.98 GPA, Sales & Business Marketing

==== Third team ====
Brandon Bye, Western Michigan University, Senior, 3.74 GPA, Food & Consumer Packaging Goods Marketing

=== 2017 CoSIDA Academic All-District teams ===
Only All-District players are eligible for the Academic All-America ballot.

==== District 2 (DC, DE, KY, MD, NJ, PA, WV) ====
Stephen Banick, West Virginia University, Junior, 3.71 GPA, Mathematics

Ryan Kellogg, West Virginia University, Sophomore, 3.87 GPA. Finance

==== District 5 (IL, IN, MI, OH) ====
Drew Shepherd, Western Michigan University, Senior. 3.32 GPA, Aviation Flight Science

Zach Bock, Western Michigan University, Senior, 3.98 GPA, Sales & Business Marketing

Brandon Bye, Western Michigan University, Senior, 3.74 GPA, Food & Consumer Packaging Goods Marketing

=== 2017 United Soccer Coaches NCAA Division I Men's Scholar All-America teams ===
Position	Name	Class	School	Major	GPA	Hometown
First Team
Goalkeeper	Drew Shepherd	Senior	Western Michigan	Aviation Flight Science	3.37	Ann Arbor, Michigan
Forward	Brandon Bye ♦	Senior	Western Michigan	Food Marketing and Supply Chain Management	3.76	Portage, Michigan
Second Team
Defender	Zach Bock	Senior	Western Michigan	Sales and Business Marketing	3.98	Novi, Michigan

♦ = Additionally, the United Soccer Coaches named Western Michigan's Brandon Bye as the 1017 NCAA Men's Soccer Division I Scholar Player of the Year. .

=== United Soccer Coaches 2017 College Team Academic Award ===
The United Soccer Coaches (formerly the NSCAA) annually recognizes college and high school soccer programs that have excelled in the classroom by posting a team grade point average of 3.0 or higher. Five of the MAC's six teams were honored this year. The schools, their head coaches, and their team GPAs are:

- University of Akron, Jared Embick, 3.09
- Bowling Green State University, Eric Nichols, 3.13
- Northern Illinois University, Ryan Swan, 3.23
- West Virginia University, Marlon LeBlanc, 3.28
- Western Michigan University, Chad Wiseman, 3.34

=== 2017 MAC awards ===
Source=

2016 MAC Men's Soccer Individual Awards
Award	Recipient(s)
Player of the Year	Brandon Bye, Forward, Western Michigan
Freshman of the Year	João Moutinho, Defender, Akron
Gary V. Palmisano Coach of the Year	Chad Wiseman, Western Michigan

=== 2017 MAC All-Conference First Team ===
Player	School	Position	Class	Hometown (high school/previous college)
Jad Arslan	West Virginia	Midfielder	Senior	Roswell, Georgia (Roswell)
Zach Bock	Western Michigan	Defender	Senior	Novi, Michigan (Detroit Catholic Central)
Brandon Bye	Western Michigan	Forward	Senior	Portage, Michigan (Portage Northern)
Tommy Clark	Western Michigan	Midfielder	R-Junior	South Bend, Indiana (Saint Joseph/Bradley)
Manuel Cordeiro	Akron	Midfielder	R-Senior	Porto, Portugal (Garcia de Orta)
Sam Gainford	Akron	Forward	R-Senior	Liverpool, England (n/a)
Nick Hinds	Akron	Midfielder	Sophpmore	Plantation, Florida (Roosevelt)
Stuart Holthusen	Akron	Forward	Senior	Auckland, New Zealand (n/a)
Devyn Jambga	SIUE	Forward	R-Senior	Harare, Zimbabwe (Harare International)
Jay McIntosh	Western Michigan	Forward	Senior	Kalamazoo, Michigan (Loy Norrix/Indiana)
João Moutinho	Akron	Defender	Freshman	Lisbon, Portugal (Liceu Camões)
Drew Shepherd	Western Michigan	Goalkeeper	R-Senior	Ann Arbor, Michigan (Huron)

=== 2017 MAC All-Conference Second Team ===
Player	School	Position	Class	Hometown (high school/previous college)
Pau Belana	Akron	Midfielder	R-Senior	Barcelona, Catalonia (Turbula/Universitat de Barcelona)
Chris Brennan	Bowling Green	Forward	Senior	Copley, Ohio (Copley)
Johan DePicker	SIUE	Defender	Junior	Brussels, Belgium (Ocean Lakes, VA/Old Dominion)
Niko De Vera	Akron	Defender	Senior	Camas, Washington (Camas)
Jorge Gonzalez	SIUE	Midfielder	Sophomore	Valencia, Spain (Cumbres School/Mercyhurst)
Steven James	West Virginia	Defender	Senior	Sussex, England (Heathfield CC/Louisburg)
Kosti Moni	Western Michigan	Midfielder	Junior	Grand Rapids, Michigan (Forest Hills Eastern/UC Santa Barbara)
Jake Rufe	Western Michigan	Midfielder	R-Junior	Huntsville, Alabama (Grissom/Indiana)
Nate Shultz	Akron	Defender	Senior	Mayfield, Ohio (Mayfield)
Alexis Souahy	Bowling Green	Defender	Senior	Saint Etienne au Mont, France (Saint Joseph/Notre Dame Coll.)
Ben Thornton	Western Michigan	Defender	Junior	Linden, Michigan (Linden/IUPUI)

=== 2017 MAC All-Freshman Team ===
Player	School	Position	Hometown (high school)

=== 2017 MAC All-Tournament Team ===
Source=

2017 Mid-American Conference Men's Soccer Tournament MVP— Stuart Holthusen (Akron)

Player	School	Class	Position	Hometown
Stuart Holthusen	Akron	Senior	Forward	Auckland, New Zealand
Manuel Cordeiro	Akron	Senior	Midfielder	Porto, Portugal
João Moutinho	Akron	Freshman	Defender	Lisbon, Portugal
Sam Gainford	Akron	Senior	Forward	Liverpool, England
Giuseppe Vitale	Western Michigan	Sophomore	Midfielder	Washington Township, Michigan
Anthony Bowie	Western Michigan	Sophomore	Midfielder	Grand Rapids, Michigan
Connor McNulty	Western Michigan	Junior	Midfielder	Orland Park, Illinois
Johan DePicker	SIUE	Junior	Defender	Brussels, Belgium
Devyn Jambga	SIUE	Senior	Forward	Harare, Zimbabwe
Louis Thomas	West Virginia	Senior	Defender	Houston, Texas
Pascal Derwaritsch	West Virginia	Sophomore	Defender	Altlussheim, Germany

=== 2017 MAC Men's Soccer Academic All-MAC Team ===
Source= The criteria for the All-MAC honor parallels the CoSIDA (College Sports Information Directors of America) standards for Academic All-America voting. Nominees must be starters or important reserves with at least a 3.20 cumulative grade-point average (on a 4.00 scale).

Player	Class	GPA	Major	Hometown (high school/previous college)
Akron
Manuel Cordeiro	R-Senior	3.255	Economics	Porto, Portugal (Garcia de Orta)
Stuart Holthusen	Senior	3.262	Business Administration	Auckland, New Zealand
Joe Korb	R-Junior	3.332	Marketing Management	Willowick, Ohio (Lake Catholic)
Nate Shultz	Senior	3.253	Accounting	Mayfield, Ohio (Mayfield)
Shane Wiedt	R-Junior	3.372	Marketing	Akron, Ohio (Archbishop Hoban)
Bowling Green
Chris Brennan	Sophomore	3.333	Business Administration	Copley, Ohio (Copley)
Charlie Maciejewski	Sophomore	3.240	Business Administration	Cincinnati, Ohio (Summit Country Day)
Anthony Mwembia	Sophomore	3.315	Insurance	Toulouse, France
Peter Pugliese	Junior	3.600	Accounting	Cambridge, Ontario, Canada (Jacob Hespeler Secondary)
Alexis Souahy	Senior	3.208	International Business	Saint Etienne au Mont, France (Saint Joseph)
Tom Wrobel	Sophomore	3.548	Health Science	Mississauga, Ontario, Canada (St. Aloysius Gonzaga Catholic)
Northern Illinois
Adrian Coardos	Junior	3.200	Business Administration	Evanston, Illinois (Niles North)
Christian Molina	Sophomore	3.679	Corporate Communications	Katy, Texas (Mayde Creek)
Ethan Pitre	Sophomore	3.406	Statistics	Minneapolis, Minnesota (Prairie Seeds Academy)
Luke Read	Senior	3.460	Finance	Ilford, England (Barking Abbey School)
Jerome Roche	Senior	3.754	Finance	Salon-de-Provence, France (Gardner-Webb)
Max Voss	Junior	3.655	Business Administration	Herten, Germany (Staedtisches Gymnasium Herten)
SIU Edwardsville
Mohamed Awad	Senior	3.297	Business Administration	Hamilton, New Zealand (Hamilton Boys'/St. John's)
Joel Duncan	Senior	3.244	Criminal Justice	Mt. Vernon, Illinois (Mt. Vernon)
Carl Hinkson	Junior	3.593	Exercise Science	St. George, Barbados (Harrison College)
TC Hull	R-Junior	3.756	Business Management	St. Charles, Illinois (St. Charles East)
Keegan McHugh	R-Junior	3.200	Business-Economics and Finance	St. Charles, Missouri (Francis Howell)
Austin Polster	Senior	3.400	Business Administration	Las Vegas, Nevada (Palo Verde/Wright State0
Kashaun Smith	Sophomore	3.800	Mass Communications	Kingston, Jamaica (Wolmer's Boys' School)
Greg Solawa	Junior	3.634	Business Administration	Niles, Illinois (Niles West/Ohio State)
West Virginia
Jad Arslan	Senior	3.21	Business	Roswell, Georgia (Roswell)
Stephen Banick	Junior	3.71	Mathematics	Pickerington, Ohio (Pickerington North)
Sebastian Garcia-Herreros	Sophomore	3.62	Civil Engineering	Southwest Ranches, Florida (Cypress Bay)
Steven James	Senior	3.41	Sport Management	Sussex, England (Heathfield CC)
Ryan Kellogg	Sophomore	3.86	Finance	Parkville, Missouri (Park Hill South)
Logan Lucas	Sophomore	3.20	General Business	Lee's Summit, Missouri ( Lee's Summit West)
Western Michigan
Zach Bock	Senior	3.98	Sales & Business Marketing	Novi, Michigan (Detroit Catholic Central)
Anthony Bowie	Sophomore	4.0	Pre-Business	Grand Rapids, Michigan (Forest Hills Central)
Brandon Bye	Senior	3.74	Food & Consumer Packaging Goods, and Marketing and Supply Chain Management	Portage, Michigan (Portage Northern)
Tommy Clark	Junior	3.93	Biomedical Sciences	South Bend, Indiana (Saint Joseph/Bradley)
Alex Ruddock	R-Sophomore	3.36	Pre-Business	Caledonia, Michigan (Caledonia)
Jake Rufe	Junior	3.22	Exercise Science	Huntsville, Alabama (Grissom/Indiana)
Drew Shepherd	R-Senior	3.32	Aviation Flight Science	Ann Arbor, Michigan (Huron)
Cameron Sipple	Junior	3.81	Exercise Science	Traverse City, Michigan (Traverse City West)
Giuseppe Vitale	Sophomore	3.68	Biomedical Sciences	Washington Twp., Michigan (Eisenhower)

== See also ==
- 2017 NCAA Division I men's soccer season
