= 2016 Mid-American Conference men's soccer season =

Mid-American Conference
- Season: 2016
- Champions: Akron
- MAC Tourney Winner: Akron
- NCAA tournament: Akron
- Matches: 96
- Goals: 110 (1.15 per match)
- Average goals/game: 1.146
- Top goalscorer: Russell Cicerone (Buffalo); 14 G, 8 A, 37 Pts
- Biggest home win: Buffalo 9–0 Daemon (August 26)
- Biggest away win: Akron 7–0 @ Northern Illinois (October 15)
- Highest scoring: Buffalo 9–0 Daemon (August 26)
- Longest winning run: 7 games Buffalo (August 26–September 18)
- Longest unbeaten run: 7 games Buffalo (7–0–0) (August 26–September 18); Akron (5–0–2 (November 29–present)
- Longest winless run: 12 games Northern Illinois (October 17, 2015–September 21)
- Longest losing run: 5 games Northern Illinois (October 11–November 5)
- Average attendance: 804.344
- All statistics correct as of June 11, 2017.

2016 Mid-American Conference men's soccer standings
| | Conf. | | | | | Overall |
| Team | W | | L | | T | W | | L | | T |
|---|---|---|---|---|---|---|---|---|---|---|
| No. 24 Akron ‡ | 3 | – | 1 | – | 1 | 13 | – | 6 | – | 3 |
| Bowling Green | 2 | – | 0 | – | 3 | 9 | – | 6 | – | 4 |
| Buffalo | 2 | – | 1 | – | 2 | 12 | – | 4 | – | 3 |
| Western Michigan | 1 | – | 1 | – | 3 | 9 | – | 6 | – | 4 |
| Northern Illinois | 1 | – | 3 | – | 1 | 2 | – | 10 | – | 4 |
| West Virginia | 1 | – | 4 | – | 0 | 8 | – | 7 | – | 1 |
‡-Tournament Champion +-Invited to the 2016 NCAA Tournament; As of 13 December 2016; Rankings from NSCAA

The 2016 Mid-American Conference men's soccer season was the 24th season of men's varsity soccer in the conference.

The Akron Zips were both the defending regular season and conference tournament champions.

== Changes from 2015 ==
- None

== Teams ==
=== Stadiums and locations ===
| Team | Location | Stadium | Capacity |
|---|---|---|---|
| Akron Zips | Akron, Ohio | FirstEnergy Stadium | 4,000 |
| Bowling Green Falcons | Bowling Green, Ohio | Cochrane Stadium | 1,000 |
| Buffalo Bulls | Amherst, New York | UB Stadium | 29,013 |
| Northern Illinois Huskies | DeKalb, Illinois | NIU Soccer and Track & Field Complex | 1,500 |
| West Virginia Mountaineers | Morgantown, West Virginia | Dlesk Stadium | 1,600 |
| Western Michigan Broncos | Kalamazoo, Michigan | WMU Soccer Complex | 500 |

- Ball State, Eastern Michigan, Kent State, Miami, Ohio, and Toledo do not sponsor men's soccer. West Virginia is an associated member.

== Regular season ==
=== Results ===
| Team/opponent | AKR | BGS | UB | NIU | WVU | WMU |
|---|---|---|---|---|---|---|
| Akron Zips | | | | | | |
| Bowling Green Falcons | | | | | | |
| Buffalo Bulls | | | | | | |
| Northern Illinois Huskies | | | | | | |
| West Virginia Mountaineers | | | | | | |
| Western Michigan Broncos | | | | | | |

=== Rankings ===
==== NSCAA National ====
Legend
| Increase in ranking |
| Decrease in ranking |
| Not ranked previous week |

| | | Pre | Wk 1 | Wk 2 | Wk 3 | Wk 4 | Wk 5 | Wk 6 | Wk 7 | Wk 8 | Wk 9 | Wk 10 | Wk 11 | Wk 12 | Final |
|---|---|---|---|---|---|---|---|---|---|---|---|---|---|---|---|
| Akron | C | 2 | 1 | 10 | 16 | 15 | 23 | 23 | 23 | 22 | RV | RV | RV | 24 | 24 |
| Bowling Green | C | | | | | | | | | | RV | NR | | | |
| Buffalo | C | | | RV | RV | RV | RV | RV | NR | | | | | | |
| Northern Illinois | C | | | | | | | | | | | | | | |
| West Virginia | C | | | | | RV | 17 | 24 | RV | NR | | | | | |
| Western Michigan | C | | RV | NR | | | | | | | | | | | |

==== NSCAA Great Lakes Regional ====
Legend
| Increase in ranking |
| Decrease in ranking |
| Not ranked previous week |

| | | Wk 1 | Wk 2 | Wk 3 | Wk 4 | Wk 5 | Wk 6 | Wk 7 | Wk 8 | Wk 9 | Wk 10 | Wk 11 | Wk 12 |
|---|---|---|---|---|---|---|---|---|---|---|---|---|---|
| Akron | C | 1 | 1 | 4 | 3 | 4 | 3 | 3 | 3 | 5 | 5 | 4 | |
| Bowling Green | C | 6 | 6 | 9 | 9 | 8 | 10 | 6 | 5 | 4 | 6 | 5 | |
| Buffalo | C | 5 | 4 | 2 | 4 | 6 | 5 | 7 | 6 | 7 | 7 | 6 | |
| Northern Illinois | C | | | | | | | | | | | | |
| West Virginia | C | | | 8 | 6 | 3 | 4 | 5 | NR | 8 | NR | | |
| Western Michigan | C | 4 | 5 | 5 | 5 | NR | 8 | 6 | NR | | 10 | NR | |

== Postseason ==
=== MAC tournament ===
Semifinals
1 | Akron | 4
4 | Western Michigan | 0
2 | Bowling Green | 1
3 | Buffalo (OT) | 2

Final
1 | Akron | 2
3 | Buffalo | 1

=== NCAA tournament ===
| Seed | Region | School | 1st round | 2nd round | 3rd round | Quarterfinals | Semifinals | Championship |
|---|---|---|---|---|---|---|---|---|
| 4 | Winston-Salem | Akron | W, 2–0 vs. Villanova – (Akron) | L, 0–1 vs. #7 Indiana – (Bloomington) | | | | |

== All-MAC awards and teams ==
2016 MAC men's soccer individual awards
| Award | Recipient(s) |
| Player of the Year | Adam Najem, MF, Akron |
| Coach of the Year | Eric Nichols, Bowling Green |
| Newcomer of the Year | Jonathan Lewis, FW, Akron |

2016 MAC men's soccer all-conference teams
| First team | Second team |
| Pau Belana MF, Akron; Adam Najem, MF, Akron; Brad Ruhaak, DF, Akron; Pat Flynn, FW, Bowling Green; Anthony Mwembia, GK Bowling Green; Russell Cicerone, FW, Buffalo; David Enstrom, DF, Buffalo; Jad Arslan, MF, West Virginia; Joey Piatczyc, MF, West Virginia; Zach Bock, DF, Western Michigan; Brandon Bye, FW, Western Michigan | Sam Gainford, FW, Akron; Nick Hinds, DF, Akron; Stuart Holthusen, FW, Akron; Jonathan Lewis, FW, Akron; Ben Lundt, GK, Akron; Tate Robertson, MF, Bowling Green; Jacob Roth, DF, Bowling Green; Joe Sullivan, MF, Bowling Green; Nick Forrester, DF, Buffalo; Jack Elliot, DF, West Virginia; Felix Angerer, FW, West Virginia; Edu Jimenez, MF, Western Michigan; Diego Lopez, MF, Western Michigan; Drew Shepherd, GK, Western Michigan |

== See also ==
- 2016 NCAA Division I men's soccer season
- 2016 MAC Men's Soccer Tournament
- 2016 Mid-American Conference women's soccer season
