= 2017 NCAA Division I men's soccer season =

American college soccer season

- Number of teams: 205
- Top goalscorer: 17 goals Niklas Brodacki (Cent. Ark.)

Statistics
- Biggest home win: Evansville 9–0 Anderson (08/25)
- Biggest away win: Mercer 7–0 @ VMI (10/28)
- Highest scoring: La Salle 4–5 @ Loyola (MD) (08/25); Anderson 0–9 @ Evansville (08/25); UC Riverside 4–5^{(ot)} @ Grand Canyon (09/14); Gardner–Webb 5–4^{(2ot)} @ Furman (09/23); Maryland 5–4 @ Wisconsin (10/13)
- Longest winning run: 12 games Akron (10/10–12/01); Wake Forest (09/09–10/21)
- Longest unbeaten run: 24 games Indiana (18–0–6) (08/25–12/10t)
- Longest winless run: 70 games VMI (0–67–3) (9/12/2014–current)
- Longest losing run: 13 games VMI (09/13–current); Longwood (09/01–10/21)
- Highest attendance: Home Field–11,075; UC Santa Barbara @ Cal Poly (10/28); 1st meeting 10,293; Cal Poly @ UC Santa Barbara (10/14); Neutral Field–8,143; Army vs. Navy @ Talen Energy Stadium, Chester, Pennsylvania (10/15)
- Lowest attendance: Home field & Neutral field Several reported as 0– Probably incorrect, but official

Tournament
- Duration: November 9 – December 10
- Most conference bids: ACC (9)

College Cup
- Date: December 10
- Site: Talen Energy Stadium, Chester, Pennsylvania
- Champions: Stanford
- Runners-up: Indiana

Seasons
- ← 2016 2018 →

The 2017 NCAA Division I men's soccer season was the 59th season of NCAA championship men's college soccer. The regular season began on August 25 and continued into the first weekend of November 2017. The season culminated with the 2017 NCAA Division I Men's Soccer Championship and the four-team College Cup finals at Talen Energy Stadium in Chester, Pennsylvania, December 8–10. There were 205 teams in men's Division I competition. The two-time defending champions, the Stanford Cardinal, won their third consecutive championship by downing the previously undefeated Indiana Hoosiers 1–0 in double overtime.

== Changes from 2016 ==
=== Coaching changes ===
Program	Outgoing coach	Manner of departure	Date of vacancy	Incoming coach	Date of appointment
Buffalo; Program terminated on April 3	Stu Riddle	Hired by Northern Kentucky	January 9, 2017	Davie Carmichael	January 31, 2017
Cleveland State	Ali Kazemaini	Resigned	November 5, 2016	Kirk Harwat	October 27, 2016, effective November 6, 2016
Elon	Chris Little	Hired by Seattle Sounders FC Academy	February 7, 2017	Marc Reeves	February 22, 2017
Florida Atlantic	Kos Donev	Was not announced	Was not announced	Joey Worthen	February 14, 2017
Florida Gulf Coast	Bob Butehorn	Hired by South Florida	December 18, 2016	Jesse Cormier	January 23, 2017
Florida International (FIU)	Scott Calabrese	Hired by Central Florida	December 6, 2016	Kevin Nylen	December 16, 2016
Houston Baptist	Steve Jones	Was not announced	Was not announced	Ryan Pratt	June 13, 2017
Marshall	Bob Gray	Retired	November 11, 2016	Chris Grassie	January 10, 2017
Mount St. Mary's	Program dormant since 2012	Will return in 2018	August 26, 2016	Bryan Cunningham	January 13, 2017
NC State	Kelly Findley	Not Retained/To Sporting Kansas City Academy	November 22, 2016	George Kiefer	November 22, 2016
Northern Illinois (NIU)	Eric Luzzi	Was not announced	Was not announced	Ryan Swan	January 23, 2017
Northern Kentucky	John Basalyga	Retired	December 6, 2016	Stu Riddle	January 9, 2017
Radford	Marc Reeves	Hired by Elon	February 22, 2017	Bryheem Hancock	March 28, 2017
South Florida	George Kiefer	Hired by NC State	November 22, 2016	Bob Butehorn	December 18, 2016
Stetson	Jared Vock	Interim not retained	December 21, 2016	Kyle Gookins	December 22, 2016
UC Irvine	Chris Volk	Not Retained	January 19, 2017	Yossi Raz	January 19, 2017
USC Upstate	Greg Hooks	Retired	July 20, 2017	Scott Halkett	July 20, 2017
Central Florida (UCF)	Bryan Cunningham	Not Retained /To Mount St. Mary's	November 15, 2016	Scott Calabrese	December 6, 2016
Vermont	Jesse Cormier	Hired by FGCU	January 23, 2017	Rob Dow	February 17, 2017

=== New programs ===
The California Baptist Lancers have been approved to begin the transition from Division II to Division I and the Western Athletic Conference in 2018–19.

=== Discontinued programs ===
Buffalo discontinued men's soccer and three other sports in April 2017 for financial reasons.

=== Conference realignment ===
School	Previous Conference	New Conference
SIU Edwardsville †	Missouri Valley Conference	Mid-American Conference
Valparaiso	Horizon League	Missouri Valley Conference
IUPUI	Summit League	Horizon League

- † = The SIU Edwardsville Cougars were initially announced as replacing Buffalo for 2018 and beyond, but less than a week after the first announcement, the timetable for SIU Edwardsville's entry was accelerated to 2017.
- The 2017 season will be the last for Belmont as an associate in Horizon League men's soccer. The team will join the Southern Conference for 2018 and beyond.

=== NCAA Top 10 Ranking ===
On October 11, the NCAA announced that, for the first time, the Division I Men's Soccer Committee would announce a Top 10 Ranking well ahead of the announcement of the tournament field and seeding. The announcement was scheduled for Sunday, October 29 during halftime of the nationally televised game between Indiana and Michigan State and is to designed give the public a sneak peek of the committee's thought process. Bill Wnek, chair of the committee and associate director of athletics at Loyola Maryland stated that, “With 75 percent of the season complete by that point, this will be a great exercise for our committee as we prepare for selection Monday.”

The ranking is to be based on the same criteria used to select and seed the 48 teams for the Division I Men's Soccer Championship, including strength of schedule, Rating Percentage Index, head-to-head competition, results versus common opponents, significant wins and losses, and locations of contests with additional input provided by the regional advisory committees.

== Season overview ==
=== Pre-season polls ===
United Soccer Coaches (formerly NSCAA)
Rank	Team
1	Stanford
2	Wake Forest
3	Denver
4	North Carolina
5	Clemson
6	Maryland
7	Indiana
8	Syracuse
9	Louisville
10	Notre Dame
11	Washington
12	Providence
13	Virginia
14	Creighton
15	Charlotte
16	Akron
17	Virginia Tech
18	UMass Lowell
19	Coastal Carolina
20	New Mexico
21	UCLA
22	Michigan State
23	FGCU
24	Connecticut
25	Butler

College Soccer News
Rank	Team
1	Stanford
2	Wake Forest
3	Maryland
4	Denver
5	North Carolina
6	Clemson
7	Louisville
8	Virginia Tech
9	Providence
10	Virginia
11	Indiana
12	Syracuse
13	Washington
14	Creighton
15	FGCU
16	Charlotte
17	Notre Dame
18	Akron
19	Albany
20	Butler
21	SIU Edwardsville
22	Loyola-Chicago
23	Michigan State
24	Portland
25	Wisconsin
26	New Mexico
27	Coastal Carolina
28	UMass Lowell
29	Connecticut
30	Pacific

Soccer America
Rank	Team
1	Stanford
2	Maryland
3	North Carolina
4	Indiana
5	Wake Forest
6	Clemson
7	Denver
8	Virginia
9	Notre Dame
10	Louisville
11	Syracuse
12	Providence
13	Akron
14	Washington
15	UCLA
16	Creighton
17	Charlotte
18	Connecticut
19	Pacific
20	Utah Valley
21	UMass Lowell
22	Coastal Carolina
23	Portland
24	Virginia Tech
25	FGCU

Top Drawer Soccer
Rank	Team
1	Stanford
2	Maryland
3	Wake Forest
4	North Carolina
5	Indiana
6	Denver
7	Syracuse
8	Clemson
9	Creighton
10	UMass Lowell
11	Providence
12	Louisville
13	Akron
14	Virginia
15	Portland
16	Utah Valley
17	Notre Dame
18	Washington
19	New Mexico
20	Virginia Tech
21	Loyola-Chicago
22	FGCU
23	Coastal Carolina
24	Butler
25	Charlotte

Hero Sports
Rank	Team
1	Stanford
2	Wake Forest
3	North Carolina
4	Syracuse
5	Clemson
6	Louisville
7	Notre Dame
8	Maryland
9	Washington
10	Creighton
11	Virginia
12	Butler
13	Providence
14	UCLA
15	Virginia Tech
16	Indiana
17	Charlotte
18	Denver
19	San Diego State
20	Akron
21	Portland
22	FGCU
23	Wisconsin
24	Oregon State
25	Albany
26	Harvard
27	UMass Lowell
28	Loyola-Chicago
29	Pacific
30	New Mexico

== Regular season ==
The regular season will begin on August 25, 2017 and end in early November 2017.

=== #1 ===
Weekly United Soccer Coaches #1 ranked team
Date	Team	Date	Team	Date	Team	Date	Team
August 3 (preseason)	Stanford	None until after season starts		August 29	Stanford	September 5	Stanford
September 12	Indiana	September 19	Notre Dame	September 26	Indiana	October 3	Indiana
October 10	Indiana	October 17	Indiana	October 24	Wake Forest	October 31	Wake Forest
November 7	Wake Forest	November 14	Wake Forest	None until after tournament		December 12	Stanford

=== Top 10 Ranking ===
On Sunday, October 29 during halftime of the nationally televised game between Indiana and Michigan State, the Division I Men's Soccer Committee announced its first-ever NCAA Top 10 Ranking. (See details above.)

1) Wake Forest (15-1-0)

2) Indiana (13-0-3)

3) North Carolina (13-2-1)

4) Clemson (11-3-0)

5) Michigan State (11-2-2)

6) Duke (10-3-2)

7) Notre Dame (9-4-2)

8) Western Michigan (13-2-1)

9) Georgetown (11-2-1)

10) Akron (10-3-1)

(Records are through games played on October 22.)

=== Conference standings ===
2017 America East Conference men's soccer standings
	Conf.					Overall
Team	W		L		T	W		L		T
Vermont	5	–	1	–	1	10	–	8	–	1
UMass Lowell	5	–	2	–	0	10	–	7	–	1
Albany ‡	4	–	2	–	1	14	–	5	–	3
No. 14 New Hampshire +	4	–	2	–	1	13	–	4	–	5
UMBC	2	–	4	–	1	7	–	6	–	5
Stony Brook	1	–	3	–	3	7	–	6	–	5
Binghamton	1	–	4	–	2	5	–	10	–	3
Hartford	1	–	5	–	1	5	–	10	–	3
‡ – 2017 Am. East Tournament champion + – Invited to the 2017 NCAA tournament; As of December 13, 2017; Rankings from United Soccer Coaches

2017 American Athletic Conference men's soccer standings
	Conf.					Overall
Team	W		L		T	W		L		T
No. 8 SMU ‡	5	–	1	–	1	17	–	3	–	1
UCF	4	–	2	–	1	8	–	6	–	2
Connecticut	4	–	3	–	0	8	–	8	–	2
Temple	4	–	3	–	0	9	–	8	–	1
South Florida	3	–	2	–	2	6	–	6	–	4
Tulsa	3	–	4	–	0	6	–	8	–	1
Memphis	2	–	3	–	2	4	–	8	–	4
Cincinnati	0	–	7	–	0	7	–	9	–	1
‡ – 2017 American Tournament champion + – Invited to the 2017 NCAA Division I Men's Soccer Championship; As of December 13, 2017; Rankings from United Soccer Coaches

2017 Atlantic 10 Conference men's soccer standings
	Conf.					Overall
Team	W		L		T	W		L		T
UMass ‡	6	–	1	–	1	15	–	4	–	3
VCU +	6	–	2	–	0	13	–	7	–	0
George Washington	6	–	2	–	0	9	–	7	–	2
Dayton	6	–	2	–	0	9	–	8	–	2
No. 11 Fordham +	5	–	2	–	1	14	–	6	–	3
Rhode Island	4	–	3	–	1	10	–	6	–	3
St. Bonaventure	4	–	4	–	0	8	–	9	–	2
Saint Louis	4	–	4	–	0	7	–	9	–	1
Davidson	3	–	4	–	1	8	–	7	–	2
LaSalle	3	–	5	–	0	8	–	9	–	1
Saint Joseph's	1	–	6	–	1	3	–	11	–	4
Duquesne	1	–	7	–	0	3	–	13	–	1
George Mason	0	–	7	–	1	5	–	9	–	2
‡ – 2017 Atlantic 10 Tournament champion + – Invited to the 2017 NCAA Division I Men's Soccer Championship; As of December 13, 2017; Rankings from United Soccer Coaches

2017 ACC men's soccer standings
	Conf.					Overall
Team	W		L		T	W		L		T
Atlantic
No. 5 Wake Forest ‡	7	–	0	–	1	19	–	2	–	2
No. 7 Louisville +	5	–	2	–	1	13	–	2	–	5
No. 17 Clemson +	4	–	4	–	0	12	–	6	–	1
NC State +	3	–	3	–	2	8	–	6	–	4
Boston College	1	–	6	–	1	6	–	10	–	1
Syracuse	0	–	6	–	2	6	–	8	–	4
Coastal
No. 4 North Carolina +	6	–	1	–	1	17	–	4	–	1
No. 13 Duke +	4	–	3	–	1	13	–	4	–	3
No. 19 Virginia +	3	–	2	–	3	13	–	4	–	5
No. 18 Notre Dame +	3	–	3	–	2	11	–	7	–	2
Virginia Tech +	3	–	5	–	0	10	–	10	–	0
Pittsburgh	2	–	6	–	0	8	–	10	–	0
‡ – 2017 ACC Tournament champion + – Invited to the 2017 NCAA Division I Men's Soccer Championship; As of December 13, 2017; Rankings from United Soccer Coaches

2017 ASUN Conference men's soccer standings
	Conf.					Overall
Team	W		L		T	W		L		T
Stetson	4	–	0	–	2	7	–	7	–	2
Florida Gulf Coast	4	–	1	–	1	8	–	6	–	3
NJIT	3	–	2	–	1	8	–	7	–	4
North Florida	2	–	3	–	1	3	–	10	–	2
Jacksonville	2	–	3	–	1	6	–	10	–	1
Lipscomb ‡	2	–	4	–	0	11	–	8	–	2
USC Upstate	1	–	5	–	0	3	–	10	–	2
‡ – 2017 ASUN tournament champion + – Invited to the 2017 NCAA Division I Men's Soccer Championship; As of November 17, 2017; Rankings from United Soccer Coaches

2017 Big East Conference men's soccer standings
	Conf.					Overall
Team	W		L		T	W		L		T
No. 12 Butler +	8	–	1	–	0	14	–	5	–	2
No. 16 Georgetown ‡	6	–	2	–	1	14	–	4	–	2
Saint John's	5	–	2	–	2	9	–	7	–	3
Xavier	5	–	4	–	0	11	–	6	–	3
Providence	2	–	2	–	5	5	–	8	–	5
Creighton	3	–	4	–	2	9	–	7	–	2
Marquette	3	–	5	–	1	3	–	11	–	2
Seton Hall	3	–	6	–	0	6	–	10	–	1
DePaul	2	–	6	–	1	5	–	11	–	2
Villanova	2	–	7	–	0	7	–	11	–	0
‡ – 2017 Big East Tournament champion + – Invited to the 2017 NCAA Division I Men's Soccer Championship; As of December 13, 2017; Rankings from United Soccer Coaches

2017 Big South Conference men's soccer standings
	Conf.					Overall
Team	W		L		T	W		L		T
High Point	7	–	1	–	0	10	–	5	–	4
Radford	5	–	1	–	2	10	–	4	–	4
Campbell	5	–	2	–	1	9	–	7	–	3
Liberty	5	–	3	–	0	11	–	6	–	1
Gardner–Webb	4	–	3	–	1	8	–	7	–	2
Presbyterian ‡	3	–	3	–	2	6	–	9	–	5
UNC Asheville	1	–	6	–	1	2	–	15	–	1
Longwood	1	–	6	–	1	1	–	15	–	2
Winthrop	1	–	7	–	0	3	–	13	–	1
‡ – 2017 Big South Tournament champion + – Invited to the 2017 NCAA Division I Men's Soccer Championship; As of November 17, 2017; Rankings from United Soccer Coaches

2017 Big Ten Conference men's soccer standings
	Conf.					Overall
Team	W		L		T	W		L		T
No. 11 Michigan +	6	–	1	–	1	12	–	6	–	2
No. 2 Indiana +	5	–	0	–	3	18	–	1	–	6
No. 6 Michigan State +	5	–	0	–	3	13	–	3	–	4
Maryland +	5	–	1	–	2	10	–	5	–	4
No. 10 Wisconsin ‡	4	–	3	–	1	12	–	5	–	5
Ohio State	3	–	5	–	0	8	–	10	–	1
Penn State	2	–	6	–	0	5	–	10	–	2
Northwestern	1	–	7	–	0	7	–	12	–	0
Rutgers	0	–	8	–	0	4	–	13	–	1
‡ – 2017 Big Ten Tournament champion + – Invited to the 2017 NCAA Division I Men's Soccer Championship; As of December 13, 2017; Rankings from United Soccer Coaches

2017 Big West Conference men's soccer standings
	Conf.					Overall
Team	W		L		T	W		L		T
North
UC Davis	7	–	2	–	1	11	–	7	–	3
UC Santa Barbara	4	–	3	–	3	6	–	8	–	5
Sacramento State	4	–	4	–	2	8	–	9	–	2
Cal Poly	3	–	6	–	1	7	–	10	–	1
South
CSU Fullerton ‡	4	–	4	–	2	10	–	8	–	4
CSU Northridge	4	–	4	–	2	10	–	9	–	2
UC Riverside	4	–	5	–	1	5	–	13	–	1
UC Irvine	3	–	5	–	2	8	–	8	–	3
‡ – 2017 Big West Tournament champion + – Invited to the 2017 NCAA Division I Men's Soccer Championship; As of November 17, 2017; Rankings from United Soccer Coaches

2017 Colonial Athletic Association men's soccer standings
	Conf.					Overall
Team	W		L		T	W		L		T
James Madison	5	–	1	–	2	9	–	7	–	3
UNC Wilmington +	5	–	3	–	0	12	–	8	–	0
Charleston	3	–	1	–	4	8	–	6	–	4
Hofstra	3	–	1	–	4	6	–	6	–	6
William & Mary ‡	3	–	2	–	3	11	–	5	–	5
Elon	3	–	2	–	3	7	–	5	–	6
Delaware	2	–	4	–	2	5	–	7	–	4
Northeastern	1	–	6	–	1	3	–	12	–	3
Drexel	1	–	6	–	1	2	–	14	–	1
‡ – 2017 CAA Tournament champion + – Invited to the 2017 NCAA Division I Men's Soccer Championship; As of November 19, 2017; Rankings from United Soccer Coaches

2017 Conference USA men's soccer standings
	Conf.					Overall
Team	W		L		T	W		L		T
No. 20 FIU +	6	–	0	–	2	12	–	2	–	4
Old Dominion ‡	6	–	2	–	0	13	–	6	–	2
Kentucky	4	–	2	–	2	8	–	6	–	4
New Mexico	3	–	3	–	2	8	–	6	–	4
Charlotte	2	–	1	–	5	8	–	5	–	6
Marshall	3	–	5	–	0	8	–	10	–	1
South Carolina	2	–	4	–	2	6	–	9	–	2
Florida Atlantic	2	–	6	–	0	2	–	14	–	0
UAB	1	–	6	–	1	5	–	7	–	4
‡ – 2017 CUSA Tournament champion + – Invited to the 2017 NCAA Division I Men's Soccer Championship; As of December 13, 2017; Rankings from United Soccer Coaches

2017 Horizon League men's soccer standings
	Conf.					Overall
Team	W		L		T	W		L		T
Green Bay	7	–	1	–	1	9	–	5	–	3
UIC ‡	6	–	2	–	1	11	–	6	–	3
Milwaukee	6	–	3	–	0	10	–	5	–	4
Wright State	6	–	3	–	0	10	–	7	–	1
Cleveland State	4	–	3	–	2	7	–	10	–	2
Detroit	4	–	4	–	1	7	–	8	–	4
Northern Kentucky	3	–	4	–	2	7	–	6	–	4
Oakland	3	–	5	–	1	6	–	10	–	1
Belmont	2	–	7	–	0	5	–	9	–	2
IUPUI	0	–	9	–	0	0	–	15	–	2
‡ – 2017 Horizon Tournament champion + – Invited to the 2017 NCAA Division I Men's Soccer Championship; As of November 17, 2017; Rankings from United Soccer Coaches

2017 Ivy League men's soccer standings
	Conf.					Overall
Team	W		L		T	W		L		T
No. 23 Dartmouth ‡	6	–	0	–	1	12	–	3	–	2
No. 25 Columbia +	5	–	1	–	1	12	–	3	–	3
Brown	2	–	3	–	2	8	–	6	–	3
Princeton	2	–	3	–	2	6	–	7	–	4
Yale	2	–	3	–	2	5	–	9	–	2
Cornell	2	–	4	–	1	7	–	8	–	2
Penn	2	–	4	–	1	4	–	12	–	1
Harvard	1	–	4	–	2	2	–	10	–	4
‡ – Conference champion + – Invited to the 2017 NCAA Division I Men's Soccer Championship; As of December 13, 2017; Rankings from United Soccer Coaches

2017 Metro Atlantic Athletic Conference men's soccer standings
	Conf.					Overall
Team	W		L		T	W		L		T
Fairfield ‡	7	–	1	–	2	12	–	5	–	3
Rider	6	–	2	–	2	12	–	5	–	2
Canisius	5	–	1	–	4	12	–	4	–	4
Manhattan	6	–	3	–	1	9	–	8	–	1
Quinnipiac	6	–	4	–	0	8	–	9	–	2
Iona	4	–	4	–	2	5	–	7	–	4
Monmouth	4	–	5	–	1	7	–	9	–	2
Siena	2	–	4	–	4	4	–	7	–	7
Marist	3	–	6	–	1	7	–	10	–	1
Saint Peter's	2	–	8	–	0	3	–	11	–	2
Niagara	1	–	8	–	1	2	–	14	–	2
‡ – 2017 MAAC Tournament champion + – Invited to the 2017 NCAA Division I Men's Soccer Championship; As of November 17, 2017; Rankings from United Soccer Coaches

2017 Mid-American Conference men's soccer standings
	Conf.					Overall
Team	W		L		T	W		L		T
No. 9 Western Michigan +	5	–	0	–	0	17	–	4	–	1
No. 3 Akron ‡	4	–	1	–	0	18	–	4	–	2
SIU Edwardsville	2	–	3	–	0	7	–	10	–	1
West Virginia	1	–	2	–	2	9	–	6	–	4
Bowling Green	1	–	3	–	1	7	–	9	–	1
Northern Illinois	0	–	4	–	1	3	–	11	–	1
‡ – 2017 MAC Tournament champion + – Invited to the 2017 NCAA Division I Men's Soccer Championship; As of December 13, 2017; Rankings from United Soccer Coaches

2017 Missouri Valley Conference men's soccer standings
	Conf.					Overall
Team	W		L		T	W		L		T
Missouri State	5	–	2	–	1	9	–	5	–	3
Central Arkansas ‡	5	–	3	–	0	9	–	11	–	1
Bradley	4	–	3	–	1	10	–	7	–	3
Evansville	3	–	4	–	1	11	–	8	–	2
Loyola Chicago	3	–	4	–	1	7	–	8	–	3
Valparaiso	3	–	5	–	0	8	–	9	–	1
Drake	2	–	4	–	2	6	–	10	–	2
‡ – 2017 MVC Tournament champion + – Invited to the 2017 NCAA Division I Men's Soccer Championship; As of November 17, 2017; Rankings from United Soccer Coaches

2017 Northeast Conference men's soccer standings
	Conf.					Overall
Team	W		L		T	W		L		T
St. Francis Brooklyn ‡	6	–	0	–	1	14	–	5	–	1
LIU Brooklyn	4	–	2	–	1	6	–	9	–	3
Fairleigh Dickinson	3	–	2	–	2	10	–	5	–	3
Robert Morris	3	–	3	–	1	4	–	11	–	3
Saint Francis (PA)	3	–	4	–	0	10	–	8	–	0
Central Connecticut	2	–	3	–	2	5	–	8	–	4
Bryant	2	–	3	–	2	2	–	10	–	3
Sacred Heart	0	–	6	–	1	3	–	14	–	1
‡ – 2017 NEC Tournament champion + – Invited to the 2017 NCAA Division I Men's Soccer Championship; As of November 17, 2017; Rankings from United Soccer Coaches

2017 Pac-12 Conference men's soccer standings
	Conf.					Overall
Team	W		L		T	W		L		T
No. 1 Stanford ‡	9	–	0	–	1	19	–	2	–	2
California +	6	–	4	–	0	11	–	7	–	0
Washington +	5	–	4	–	1	12	–	7	–	1
UCLA	4	–	6	–	0	7	–	10	–	1
Oregon State	4	–	6	–	0	7	–	11	–	0
San Diego State	1	–	9	–	0	6	–	13	–	0
‡ – Conference champion + – Invited to the 2017 NCAA Division I Men's Soccer Championship; As of December 13, 2017; Rankings from United Soccer Coaches

2017 Patriot League men's soccer standings
	Conf.					Overall
Team	W		L		T	W		L		T
Loyola Maryland	7	–	2	–	0	11	–	6	–	1
Boston U.	6	–	2	–	1	7	–	8	–	4
Lehigh	5	–	3	–	1	11	–	7	–	1
Bucknell	5	–	3	–	1	7	–	8	–	4
Holy Cross	4	–	3	–	2	7	–	9	–	4
No. 21 Colgate ‡	4	–	4	–	1	12	–	11	–	1
Army	3	–	4	–	2	9	–	6	–	2
American	3	–	6	–	0	4	–	12	–	1
Lafayette	3	–	6	–	0	4	–	14	–	0
Navy	0	–	7	–	2	2	–	13	–	2
‡-Tournament Champion +-Invited to the NCAA Division I Men's Soccer Championship; As of December 13, 2017; Rankings from United Soccer Coaches

2017 Southern Conference men's soccer standings
	Conf.					Overall
Team	W		L		T	W		L		T
East Tenn. State	6	–	0	–	4	9	–	2	–	7
UNC Greensboro	6	–	3	–	1	10	–	7	–	3
Furman	5	–	2	–	3	12	–	5	–	3
Mercer ‡	4	–	4	–	2	7	–	9	–	6
Wofford	4	–	6	–	0	4	–	15	–	0
VMI	0	–	10	–	0	0	–	16	–	2
‡-2017 SoCon Tournament Champion +-Invited to the 2017 NCAA Division I Men's Soccer Championship; As of November 17, 2017; Rankings from United Soccer Coaches

2017 Summit League men's soccer standings
	Conf.					Overall
Team	W		L		T	W		L		T
Denver	5	–	0	–	0	11	–	6	–	2
Western Illinois	3	–	2	–	0	5	–	10	–	0
Omaha ‡	2	–	1	–	2	10	–	6	–	3
Eastern Illinois	2	–	2	–	1	4	–	9	–	6
Oral Roberts	1	–	4	–	0	4	–	11	–	1
Fort Wayne	0	–	4	–	1	5	–	9	–	4
‡-Tournament Champion +-Invited to the 2017 NCAA Division I Men's Soccer Championship; As of November 17, 2017; Rankings from United Soccer Coaches

2017 Sun Belt Conference men's soccer standings
	Conf.					Overall
Team	W		L		T	W		L		T
No. 15 Coastal Carolina ‡	4	–	1	–	0	14	–	7	–	1
Georgia State	3	–	1	–	1	12	–	7	–	1
Georgia Southern	3	–	2	–	0	9	–	8	–	1
Hartwick	2	–	2	–	1	7	–	9	–	2
Appalachian State	0	–	3	–	2	5	–	8	–	6
Howard	0	–	3	–	2	2	–	15	–	3
‡-Sun Belt Tournament Champion +-Invited to the 2017 NCAA Division I Men's Soccer Championship; As of December 13, 2017; Rankings from United Soccer Coaches

2017 West Coast Conference men's soccer standings
	Conf.					Overall
Team	W		L		T	W		L		T
San Francisco ‡	6	–	1	–	0	10	–	9	–	0
Pacific +	4	–	2	–	1	13	–	4	–	2
Portland	4	–	2	–	1	9	–	7	–	1
Saint Mary's	3	–	2	–	2	6	–	6	–	5
Santa Clara	3	–	3	–	1	3	–	13	–	1
San Diego	2	–	3	–	2	8	–	6	–	3
Loyola Marymount	2	–	5	–	0	4	–	12	–	2
Gonzaga	0	–	6	–	1	6	–	9	–	2
‡-Conference champion + - Invited to the NCAA Division I Men's Soccer Championship; As of November 19, 2017; Rankings from United Soccer Coaches

2017 Western Athletic Conference men's soccer standings
	Conf.					Overall
Team	W		L		T	W		L		T
Air Force +	8	–	0	–	2	14	–	3	–	3
No. 24 Seattle ‡	6	–	1	–	3	15	–	4	–	4
UNLV	7	–	3	–	0	11	–	9	–	1
San Jose State	5	–	4	–	1	9	–	11	–	1
UTRGV	4	–	4	–	2	7	–	7	–	3
Grand Canyon	4	–	5	–	1	7	–	11	–	1
Cal St. Bakersfield	4	–	5	–	1	6	–	11	–	1
Utah Valley	3	–	5	–	2	6	–	10	–	2
UMKC	3	–	7	–	0	5	–	10	–	3
Incarnate Word	3	–	7	–	0	5	–	11	–	1
Houston Baptist	2	–	8	–	0	5	–	10	–	0
‡-Tournament Champion + - Invited to the NCAA Division I Men's Soccer Championship; As of November 19, 2017; Rankings from United Soccer Coaches

=== Major upsets ===
In this list, a "major upset" is defined as a game won by a team ranked 10 or more spots lower or an unranked team that defeats a team ranked #15 or higher.

Date	Winner	Score	Loser
September 1	@ UNC Wilmington	1–0	#3 North Carolina
September 1	Furman	1–0^{(2ot)}	@ #4 Denver
September 5	Georgia State	2–1^{(ot)}	@ #2 Wake Forest
September 8	@ NC State	1–0	#3 Clemson
September 8	@ UC Irvine	1–0	#9 Denver
September 9	Tulsa	2–0	@ #1 Stanford
September 9	@ Northeastern	2–1	#12 UMass Lowell
September 10	@ Cal State Northridge	2–0	#9 Denver
September 12	Cincinnati	1–0	@ #13 Kentucky
September 15	#17 Louisville	2–1	@ #7 Syracuse
September 15	@ Northern Illinois	1–0	#10 Omaha
September 15	@ UC Santa Barbara	1–0	#14 Pacific
September 19	Cornell	1–0^{(ot)}	@ #7 Syracuse
September 19	@ South Carolina	1–0	#15 Furman
September 22	@ Virginia Tech	2–1	#1 Notre Dame
September 22	Duke	2–1	@ #11 Syracuse
September 23	@ Saint Louis	2–0	#5 Stanford
September 23	Gardner–Webb	5–4^{(2ot)}	@ #13 Furman
September 27	@ Akron	4–1	#4 Michigan State
September 29	@ Portland	4–1	#9 Western Michigan
September 30	@ UMBC	1–0	#12 New Hampshire
September 30	@ Old Dominion	2–0	#13 Kentucky
September 30	VCU	1–0^{(2ot)}	@ #15 UNC Wilmington
October 3	Pittsburgh	1–0	@ #14 Columbia
October 11	@ West Virginia	1–0	#6 Michigan State
October 11	Charleston	2–1	@ #15 UNC Wilmington
October 13	Pittsburgh	1–0	@ #7 Notre Dame
October 14	@ James Madison	2–0	#15 UNC Wilmington
October 17	Radford	1–0	@ #10 Virginia
October 20	Coastal Carolina	1–0	@ #3 Maryland
October 21	NC State	3–2	@ #5 Louisville
October 23	VCU	3–0	@ #9 Maryland
October 28	@ St. John's	1–0	#10 Georgetown
October 29	#19 Michigan	2–1	@ #9 Maryland
November 5	Ohio State	2–1	@ #8 Michigan State
November 5	#21 Notre Dame	2–1	@ #3 North Carolina
November 10	Charlotte	3–1 @ Old Dominion	#8 FIU
November 10	Wisconsin	4–0 @ Grand Park	#10 Michigan
November 10	San Jose State	1–0 @ UNLV	#12 Air Force

=== Conference winners and tournaments ===
Conference	Regular season winner	Conference Player of the Year	Conference Coach of the Year	Conference tournament	Tournament venue (city)	Tournament champion
America East; Conference	Vermont	None named– 4 position awards	New Hampshire staff (Marc Hubbard, HC)	2017 America East Tournament	Campus sites	Albany
American Athletic; Conference	SMU	None named– 4 position awards	SMU staff (Kevin Hudson, HC)	2017 American Athletic Tournament	Westcott Field (University Park, TX)	SMU
Atlantic 10; Conference	UMass	None named– 3 position awards	Fran O'Leary (UMass)	2017 A-10 Tournament	Baujan Field (Dayton, OH)	UMass
Atlantic Coast; Conference	Atlantic–Wake Forest; Coastal–North Carolina	None named– 3 position awards	Bobby Muuss (Wake Forest)	2017 ACC Tournament	MUSC Health Stadium (Charleston, SC)	Wake Forest
Atlantic Sun; Conference	Stetson	Mamadou Guirassy (NJIT)	Kyle Gookins (Stetson)	2017 ASUN Tournament	Campus sites	Lipscomb
Big East; Conference	Butler	None named– 4 position awards	Butler staff (Paul Snape, HC)	2017 Big East Tournament	Campus sites	Georgetown
Big South; Conference	High Point	None named– 2 position awards	EJ O’Keeffe (High Point)	2017 Big South Tournament	Campus sites	Presbyterian
Big Ten; Conference	Michigan	None named– 4 position awards	Chaka Daley (Michigan)	2017 B1G Tournament	Grand Park (Westfield, IN)	Wisconsin
Big West; Conference	N–UC Davis; S–CSU Fullerton & CSU Northridge (tie)	None named– 4 position awards	Dwayne Shaffer (UC Davis)	2017 Big West Tournament	Campus sites	CSU Fullerton
Colonial Athletic; Association	James Madison	Antonio Bustamante (William & Mary)	Tom Foley (James Madison)	2017 CAA Tournament	James Madison Soccer Complex (Harrisonburg, VA)	William & Mary
Conference; USA	FIU	Santiago Patino (FIU)	Kevin Nylen (FIU)	2017 C-USA Tournament	Old Dominion Soccer Complex (Norfolk, VA)	Old Dominion
Horizon; League	Green Bay	AJ Paterson (Wright State)	Jeremy Bonomo (Green Bay)	2017 Horizon League Tournament	Alumni Field (Dayton, OH)	UIC
Ivy; League	Dartmouth	None named– 2 position awards	Chad Riley (Dartmouth)	No tournament		
Metro Atlantic; Athletic; Conference	Fairfield	None named– 3 position awards	Carl Rees (Fairfield)	2017 MAAC Tournament	Campus sites	Fairfield
Mid-American; Conference	Western Michigan	Brandon Bye (Western Michigan)	Chad Wiseman (Western Michigan)	2017 MAC Tournament	WMU Soccer Complex (Kalamazoo, MI)	Akron
Missouri Valley; Conference	Missouri State	Niklas Brodacki (Central Arkansas)	Central Arkansas staff (Ross Duncan, HC)	2017 MVC tournament	Shea Stadium (Peoria, IL)	Central Arkansas
Northeast; Conference	St. Francis Brooklyn	Rasmus Hansen (LIU Brooklyn)	St. Francis Brooklyn staff (Tom Giovatto, HC)	2017 NEC Tournament	Campus sites	St. Francis Brooklyn
Pac-12; Conference	Stanford	Foster Langsdorf (Stanford)	Jeremy Gunn (Stanford)	No tournament		
Patriot; League	Loyola Maryland	None named– 4 position awards	Steve Nichols (Loyola Maryland)	2017 Patriot League Tournament	Hosted by season champion	Colgate
Southern; Conference	East Tennessee State	Laurence Wyke (Furman)	Bo Oshoniyi (East Tennessee State)	2017 SoCon Tournament	Eugene Stone Soccer Stadium (Greenville, SC)	Mercer
The Summit; League	Denver	None named– 3 position awards	Jamie Franks (Denver)	2017 Summit League Tournament	Al F. Caniglia Field {Omaha, NE}	Omaha
Sun Belt; Conference	Coastal Carolina	Frantzdy Pierrot (Coastal Carolina)	Shaun Docking (Coastal Carolina)	2017 Sun Belt Tournament	Coastal Carolina University Soccer Field (Conway, SC)	Coastal Carolina
West Coast; Conference	San Francisco	Leon Schwarzer (San Francisco)	Eddie Soto (San Francisco)	No tournament		
Western Athletic; Conference	Air Force	None named– 2 position awards	Doug Hill (Air Force)	2017 WAC Tournament	Peter Johann Memorial Field (Las Vegas, NV)	Seattle

== Statistics ==
=== Individuals ===
GOALS
Rank	Scorer	School	Games	Goals
1	Niklas Brodacki	Central Arkansas	20	17
2	Mamadou Guirassy	NJIT	19	16
	Jon Bakero	Wake Forest	23	16
4	Danny Musovski	UNLV	17	15
	Santiago Patino	FIU	18	15
	Joshua "JJ" Donnelly	Campbell	18	15
	Mark Forrest	Lehigh	19	15
	Antonio Bustamante	William & Mary	21	15
9	Jamie O'Grady	Hartwick	18	14
	Garrett McLaughlin	SMU	21	14
	Foster Langsdorf	Stanford	23	14

Last update on 13 December 2017

GOALS AGAINST AVERAGE
Rank	Keeper	School	Games	Minutes	GA	GAA
1	Trey Muse	Indiana	25	2419	7	.260
2	Nico Corti	Stanford	23	2098	9	.386
3	Dylan Castanheira	Columbia	18	1692	8	.425
4	Andreu Cases Mundet	Wake Forest	22	2018	11	.491
5	Liam Priestley	Missouri State	17	1615	9	.501
6	Danny Vitiello	Albany	15	1433	8	.502
7	Matthew Keller	Evansville	12	1039	6	.520
8	Andrew Pesci	New Hampshire	22	2107	13	.555
9	Matthew Jegier	Elon	18	1740	11	.569
10	Christopher Palacios	Dartmouth	16	1414	9	.573

Last update on 13 December 2017

ASSISTS
Rank	Player	School	Games	Assists
1	Chris Mueller	Wisconsin	21	20
2	Jon Bakero	Wake Forest	23	14
3	Rey Ortiz	Portland	17	13
	Cameron Lindley	North Carolina	22	13
	Jared Stroud	Colgate	24	13
6	Brandon Servania	Wake Forest	21	11
	Zach Wright	North Carolina	21	11
8	Doyle Tuvesson	Lehigh	18	10
	Aaron Lombardi	San Francisco	19	10
	Declan McCabe	Georgetown	19	10
	Bjarki Benediktsson	Canisius	20	10
	Ryder Bell	William & Mary	21	10

Last update on 13 December 2017

SAVE PERCENTAGE
Rank	Keeper	School	Games	Minutes	Saves	GA	Save %
1	Trey Muse	Indiana	25	2419	65	7	.903
2	Nico Corti	Stanford	23	2098	73	9	.890
3	Danny Vitiello	Albany	15	1433	56	8	.879
4	Liam Priestley	Missouri State	17	1615	63	9	.875
5	Matthew Keller	Evansville	12	1039	40	6	.870
6	Tom McMahon	Stony Brook	10	901	46	7	.868
7	Marcellin Gohier	Manhattan	14	1301	53	9	.855
8	Brandon Barnes	Bradley	21	1966	103	18	.851
9	Dylan Castanheira	Columbia	18	1692	44	8	.846
10	Nate Himes	Marshall	13	1125	59	11	.843

Last update on 13 December 2017

TOTAL POINTS
Rank	Player	School	Games	Goals	Assists	Points
1	Jon Bakero	Wake Forest	23	16	14	46
2	Mark Forrest	Lehigh	19	15	8	38
	Niklas Brodacki	Central Arkansas	21	17	4	38
	Chris Mueller	Wisconsin	21	9	20	38
5	Danny Musovski	UNLV	17	15	6	36
5	Santiago Patino	FIU	18	15	5	35
	Mamadou Guirassy	NJIT	19	16	3	35
	Antonio Bustamante	William & Mary	21	15	5	35
9	Foster Langsdorf	Stanford	23	14	6	34
10	Kieran Roberts	Radford	18	15	1	31
	Sivert Daehlie	Radford	18	12	7	31
	Brandon Bye	Western Michigan	21	12	7	31
	Brandon Guhl	Butler	21	13	5	31
	Garrett McLaughlin	SMU	21	14	3	31

Last update on 13 December 2017

TOTAL SAVES
Rank	Keeper	School	Games	Saves
1	Jacob Jordan	Drexel	17	110
2	Ben Lundgaard	Virginia Tech	20	108
3	Brandon Barnes	Bradley	21	103
4	Rafael Pereira	Rutgers	18	97
5	Winter Fondi	Robert Morris	18	96
6	Thor Arne Hofs	George Washington	18	93
	Philipp Schilling	Wisconsin	22	93
8	Mac Burke	Navy	17	92
9	Mike Novotny	Eastern Illinois	18	91
	Eric Dick	Butler	20	91

Last update on 13 December 2017

- Individual statistics are through the games of 10 December 2017.

=== Teams ===
SCORING OFFENSE
Rank	School	Games	Goals	Goals/Game
1	FIU	18	50	2.778
2	Wake Forest	23	58	2.522
3	Gardner–Webb	17	42	2.471
4	North Carolina	22	53	2.409
5	Canisius	20	45	2.250
6	Clemson	19	41	2.158
	VCU	19	41	2.158
8	Radford	18	38	2.111
	Saint Francis (PA)	18	38	2.111
10	Stanford	23	48	2.087

Last update on 13 December 2017

SCORING DEFENSE (Team Goals Against Average)
Rank	School	Games	Minutes	GA	Team GAA
1	Indiana	25	2419	7	.260
2	Stanford	23	2122	9	.382
3	Columbia	18	1692	8	.425
4	Missouri State	17	1615	9	.501
5	Wake Forest	23	3137	13	.547
6	New Hampshire	22	2107	13	.555
7	Akron	24	2229	14	.565
8	Elon	18	1740	11	.569
9	SMU	21	1963	13	.596
10	Michigan St.	20	1889	13	.619

Last update on 13 December 2017

SHUTOUT PERCENTAGE
Rank	School	Games	Shutouts	Shutout %
1	Indiana	25	18	.720
2	Stanford	23	16	.696
3	Missouri State	17	11	.647
4	Western Michigan	22	14	.636
5	Columbia	18	11	.611
6	Louisville	20	12	.600
7	Dartmouth	17	10	.588
8	SMU	21	12	.571
9	Wake Forest	23	13	.565
10	Elon	18	10	.556

Last update on 13 December 2017

- Team statistics are through the games of 10 December 2017.

WON-LOST-TIED PERCENTAGE
Rank	School	Wins	Loses	Ties	W-L-T %
1	Stanford	19	2	2	.870
	Wake Forest	17	2	2	.870
3	Indiana	18	1	6	.840
4	SMU	17	3	1	.833
5	North Carolina	17	4	1	.795
	Western Michigan	17	4	1	.795
7	Akron	18	4	2	.792
8	FIU	12	2	4	.778
9	Air Force	14	3	3	.775
	Louisville	13	2	5	.775

Last update on 13 December 2017

== Awards and honors ==
=== Hermann Trophy ===
- The Hermann Trophy is given to the year's most outstanding player. Finalists:
  - Jon Bakero (FW), Wake Forest
  - Tomas Hilliard-Arce (DF), Stanford
  - Grant Lillard (DF), Indiana

=== Senior CLASS Award ===
- The Senior CLASS Award is presented each year to the most outstanding senior NCAA Division I. Finalists:
  - Jon Bakero (FW), Wake Forest
  - Fraser Colmer (DF), Radford
  - Jimmy Fiscus (DF), Michigan State
  - Foster Langsdorf (FW), Stanford
  - Wyatt Omsberg (DF), Dartmouth

=== All-Americans ===
On December 7, 2017, United Soccer Coaches announced their All-America teams, broken into three starting XI's.

Position	1st Team		2nd Team		3rd Team	
Position	Player	School	Player	School	Player	School
GK	Eric Dick	Butler	Drew Shepherd	Western Michigan	Jonny Sutherland	East Tennessee State
DF	Tomas Hilliard-Arce; Tim Kübel; Grant Lillard; João Moutinho	Stanford; Louisville; Indiana; Akron	Jimmy Fiscus; Andrew Gutman; Wyatt Omsberg	Michigan State; Indiana; Dartmouth	Nathan Aune; Jordan Cano; Oscar Chacon; Kevin Politz	Seattle U SMU; Air Force; Wake Forest
MF	Tucker Bone; Mauro Cichero; Cameron Lindley	Air Force; SMU; North Carolina	Jose Aguinaga; Christopher Lema; Rafael Santos	Rider; Georgetown; VCU	Antonio Bustamante; Daniel Krutzen; Paul Marie; Eryk Williamson	William & Mary; Albany; FIU; Maryland
FW	Jon Bakero; Brandon Bye ♦ Foster Langsdorf; Santiago Patino	Wake Forest; Western Michigan; Stanford; FIU	Arthur Bosua; Jon Gallagher; Chris Mueller; Robin Schmidt; Alan Winn	Columbia; Notre Dame; Wisconsin; New Hampshire; North Carolina	Mark Forrest; Garrett McLaughlin; Davis Smith; Brian White	Lehigh; SMU; UMass; Duke

♦ = Additionally, the United Soccer Coaches named Western Michigan's Brandon Bye as the 2017 NCAA Men's Soccer Division I Scholar Player of the Year.

=== Coaches ===
- United Soccer Coaches College Coach of the Year: Jeremy Gunn, Stanford

== See also ==
- College soccer
- List of NCAA Division I men's soccer programs
- 2017 in American soccer
- 2017 NCAA Division I Men's Soccer Championship
- 2017 NCAA Division I women's soccer season
