= 2017 Akron Zips men's soccer team =

American college soccer season

2017 Akron Zips men's soccer

MAC Tournament champions

NCAA Tournament, College Cup
- Conference: Mid-American Conference
- U. Soc. Coaches poll: No. 7
- TopDrawerSoccer.com: No. 3
- Record: 18–3–2 (4–1–0 MAC)
- Head coach: Jared Embick (5th season)
- Assistant coaches: Leo Chappel (3rd season); Ger Coppinger (3rd season); T.J. Kolba (3rd season)
- Home stadium: FirstEnergy Stadium–Cub Cadet Field

2017 Mid-American Conference men's soccer standings
	Conf.					Overall
Team	W		L		T	W		L		T
No. 9 Western Michigan +	5	–	0	–	0	17	–	4	–	1
No. 3 Akron ‡	4	–	1	–	0	18	–	4	–	2
SIU Edwardsville	2	–	3	–	0	7	–	10	–	1
West Virginia	1	–	2	–	2	9	–	6	–	4
Bowling Green	1	–	3	–	1	7	–	9	–	1
Northern Illinois	0	–	4	–	1	3	–	11	–	1
‡ – 2017 MAC Tournament champion + – Invited to the 2017 NCAA Division I Men's Soccer Championship; As of December 13, 2017; Rankings from United Soccer Coaches

The 2017 Akron Zips men's soccer team represented The University of Akron during the 2017 NCAA Division I men's soccer season. The Zips, played in the Mid-American Conference.

The Zips ended their 12-year reign as the MAC regular season champions, as an upstart campaign by Western Michigan saw the Broncos beat the Zips on tiebreaker. In the Mid-American Conference Men's Soccer Tournament, Akron defeated Western Michigan, 3-1, in the championship match to win their sixth straight MAC Tournament championship. The championship ensured the program's 14th-straight berth into the 2017 NCAA Division I Men's Soccer Tournament. In the NCAA Tournament, Akron advanced to their fifth-ever College Cup after posting victories over Seattle U, Wisconsin, and Louisville.

The Zips were guided by fifth-year head coach, Jared Embick.

== Roster ==
As of December 1, 2017

Note: Flags indicate national team as defined under FIFA eligibility rules; some limited exceptions apply. Players may hold more than one non-FIFA nationality.

No.	Pos.	Nation	Player
1	GK	(Germany) GER	Ben Lundt
2	DF	(Portugal) POR	João Moutinho
3	DF	(United States) USA	Nick Hinds
4	DF	(United States) USA	Niko de Vera
5	DF	(United States) USA	Marc Alexander
6	MF	(United States) USA	Skye Harter
7	FW	(England) ENG	Sam Gainford
8	DF	(United States) USA	Morgan Hackworth
9	FW	(New Zealand) NZL	Stuart Holthusen
10	MF	(Portugal) POR	Manuel Cordeiro
11	FW	(Canada) CAN	Marcel Zajac
12	MF	(Canada) CAN	Reggie Laryea
13	MF	(Spain) ESP	Pau Belana
14	FW	(Nigeria) NGA	David Egbo
15	FW	(Eritrea) ERI	Ezana Kahsay
16	DF	(United States) USA	Shane Wiedt

No.	Pos.	Nation	Player
17	DF	(United States) USA	Joe Korb
18	DF	(United States) USA	Nate Shultz
19	MF	(Brazil) BRA	Dener Dos Santos
20	DF	(United States) USA	Alex Mapp
21	MF	(United States) USA	Christian Lue Young
22	DF	(United States) USA	Jackson Crawford
23	MF	(Cameroon) CMR	Barth-Luther Mouafo
24	GK	(United States) USA	Tor Saunders
25	DF	(United States) USA	Daniel Strachan
26	MF	(Canada) CAN	Faisal Ghaffur
27	DF	(Republic of Ireland) IRL	Declan Watters
28	GK	(United States) USA	Nick Costa
29	FW	(United States) USA	Braden Petno
30	GK	(United States) USA	Codie Lynd
31	DF	(Canada) CAN	Nate Brown

== Schedule ==
Date Time, TV	Rank^{#}	Opponent^{#}	Result	Record	Site City, State
Exhibition
August 16*; 1:00 p.m.	No. 16	Penn State	W 1–0		FirstEnergy Stadium (1,154); Akron, OH
August 19*; 4:00 p.m.	No. 16	Loyola (MD)	L 0–1		FirstEnergy Stadium (1,195); Akron, OH
Regular Season
August 25*; 9:00 p.m.	No. 16	at No. 18 Utah Valley	L 0–1	0–1–0	Clyde Field (4,351); Orem, UT
August 28*; 7:00 p.m., SLTV	No. 16	at No. 3 Denver	L 0–1	0–2–0	CIBER Field (503); Denver, CO
September 1*; 7:00 p.m., ESPN3	No. 24	No. 10 Washington	W 2–0	1–2–0	FirstEnergy Stadium (1,987); Akron, OH
September 9*; 10:00 p.m.		at UC Santa Barbara	W 3–1	2–2–0	Harder Stadium (1,759); Santa Barbara, CA
September 16*; 7:00 p.m., A10N		at Saint Louis	T 0–0 ^{2OT}	2–2–1	Hermann Stadium (601); St. Louis, MO
September 24*; 12:00 p.m., ESPN3		No. 21 UMass Lowell	W 5–0	3–2–1	FirstEnergy Stadium (1,320); Akron, OH
September 27*; 7:00 p.m., ESPN3		No. 4 Michigan State	W 4–1	4–2–1	FirstEnergy Stadium (2,454); Akron, OH
September 30*; 7:00 p.m., ESPN3		St. Mary's	W 2–1 ^{2OT}	5–2–1	FirstEnergy Stadium (1,813); Akron, OH
October 3*; 7:00 p.m., ACCN	No. 25	at Syracuse	W 1–0	6–2–1	SU Soccer Stadium (1,172); Syracuse, NY
October 7; 1:00 p.m., WMTV	No. 25	at No. 12 Western Michigan	L 0–1	6–3–1 (0–1–0)	WMU Soccer Complex (923); Kalamazoo, MI
October 10*; 7:00 p.m., ESPN3		Cleveland State	W 2–0	7–3–1	FirstEnergy Stadium (1,844); Akron, OH
October 13; 7:00 p.m., ESPN3		SIU Edwardsville	W 3–1	8–3–1 (1–1–0)	FirstEnergy Stadium (1,560); Akron, OH
October 17*; 7:00 p.m., ESPN3	No. 19	No. 12 Notre Dame	W 2–0	9–3–1	FirstEnergy Stadium (1,905); Akron, OH
October 21; 7:00 p.m., ESPN3	No. 19	Bowling Green	W 2–1 ^{OT}	10–3–1 (2–1–0)	FirstEnergy Stadium (1,809); Akron, OH
October 24*; 7:00 p.m., ACCN	No. 14	at Pittsburgh	W 3–0	11–3–1	Ambrose Urbanic Field (707); Pittsburgh, PA
October 27; 7:00 p.m., WVUS	No. 14	at West Virginia	W 4–0	12–3–1 (3–1–0)	Dick Dlesk Stadium (832); Morgantown, WV
November 1*; 7:00 p.m., ESPN3	No. 10	Marshall	W 2–0	13–3–1	FirstEnergy Stadium (1,252); Akron, OH
November 4; 7:00 p.m., ESPN3	No. 10	Northern Illinois; Senior Night	W 4–0	14–3–1 (4–1–0)	FirstEnergy Stadium (2,061); Akron, OH
MAC Tournament
November 10; 11:00 a.m., WMTV	(2) No. 7	vs. (3) SIU Edwardsville; Semifinals	W 2–1 ^{2OT}	15–3–1	WMU Soccer Complex (479); Kalamazoo, MI
November 12; 1:00 p.m., ESPN3	(2) No. 7	at (1) No. 4 Western Michigan; MAC Championship	W 3–1	16–3–1	WMU Soccer Complex (650); Kalamazoo, MI
NCAA Tournament
November 19*; 1:00 p.m., ESPN3	(5) No. 4	No. 23 Seattle U Second Round	W 3–0	17–3–1	FirstEnergy Stadium (1,739); Akron, OH
November 25*; 4:00 p.m., ESPN3	(5) No. 4	No. 20 Wisconsin; Third Round	W 3–2	18–3–1	FirstEnergy Stadium (2,089); Akron, OH
December 1*; 7:00 p.m., ESPN3	(5) No. 4	at (4) No. 9 Louisville; Quarterfinals	T 0–0 (W 4–3 PK) ^{2OT}	18–3–2	Lynn Stadium (3,179); Louisville, KY
December 8*; 6:00 p.m., ESPNU	(5) No. 4	vs. (9) No. 3 Stanford; Semifinals	L 0–2	18–4–2	Talen Energy Stadium (4,948); Chester, PA
*Non-conference game. ^{#}Rankings from United Soccer Coaches. (#) Tournament seedings in parentheses.

== Rankings ==
=== National rankings ===
Ranking movements Legend: ██ Increase in ranking ██ Decrease in ranking — = Not ranked RV = Received votes
	Week																	
Poll	Pre	1	2	3	4	5	6	7	8	9	10	11	12	13	14	15	16	Final
United Soccer	16	24	RV	RV		RV	RV	RV	19	14	10	7	4	Not released				
TopDrawer Soccer	13	13	16	—			24	8	12	15	9	5	3	3	3	3		
CollegeSoccerNews.com	N/A	20	26	25	RV	29	17	21	17	15	11	10	5	Not released				

=== Regional rankings ===
Ranking movements
	Week												
Poll	1	2	3	4	5	6	7	8	9	10	11	12	Final
USC Midwest Region													

== Season statistics ==
Individual Player Statistics (As of December 2, 2017)
Player	App	Goals	Asst	Points	Shots	Shot%	SOG	SOG%	GW	Pk-Att	GA	Saves	SO
Forwards
Egbo, David	17	1	4	6	21	.048	7	.333	1	0-0	0	0	0
Gainford, Sam	17	10	5	25	40	.200	24	.480	5	2-3	0	0	0
Holthusen, Stuart	23	12	3	27	52	.231	23	.442	5	2-2	0	0	0
Kahsay, Ezana	21	2	3	7	22	.091	5	.227	2	0-0	0	0	0
Petno, Braden	0	0	0	0	0	.000	0	.000	0	0-0	0	0	0
Zajac, Marcel	18	4	1	9	26	.154	11	.423	1	0-0	0	0	0
Midfielders
Belana, Pau	21	0	3	3	11	.000	2	.182	0	0-0	0	0	0
Cordeiro, Manuel	22	2	5	9	34	.059	13	.382	0	0-0	0	0	0
Crawford, Jackson	3	1	0	2	1	1.000	1	1.000	0	0-0	0	0	0
Dos Santos, Dener	3	0	0	0	0	.000	0	.000	0	0-0	0	0	0
Ghaffur, Faisal	14	1	0	2	3	.333	1	.333	1	0-0	0	0	0
Harter, Skye	23	4	6	14	18	.222	9	.500	1	0-0	0	0	0
Lue Young, Christian	0	0	0	0	0	.000	0	.000	0	0-0	0	0	0
Mouafo, Barth-Luther	7	1	0	2	1	1.000	1	1.000	0	0-0	0	0	0
Defenders
Alexander, Marc	3	0	0	0	2	.000	0	.000	0	0-0	0	0	0
Brown, Nate	6	0	0	0	1	.000	0	.000	0	0-0	0	0	0
De Vera, Niko	22	0	4	4	5	.000	2	.400	0	0-0	0	0	0
Hackworth, Morgan	21	0	5	5	6	.000	2	.333	0	0-0	0	0	0
Hinds, Nick	22	6	4	16	20	.300	9	.450	1	0-0	0	0	0
Korb, Joe	11	0	2	2	5	.000	3	.600	0	0-0	0	0	0
Laryea, Reggie	8	1	0	2	2	.500	1	.500	0	0-0	0	0	0
Mapp, Alex	0	0	0	0	0	.000	0	.000	0	0-0	0	0	0
Moutinho, Joao	23	3	5	11	38	.079	17	.447	1	0-0	0	0	0
Schultz, Nate	22	2	2	6	11	.182	4	.364	1	0-0	0	0	0
Strachan, Daniel	23	0	2	2	4	.000	1	.250	0	0-0	0	0	0
Watters, Declan	0	0	0	0	0	.000	0	.000	0	0-0	0	0	0
Wiedt, Shane	11	0	0	0	1	.000	0	.000	0	0-0	0	0	0
Goalkeepers
Costa, Nick	0	0	0	0	0	.000	0	.000	0	0-0	0	0	0
Lundt, Ben	19	0	0	0	0	.000	0	.000	0	0-0	10	46	10
Lynd, Codie	0	0	0	0	0	.000	0	.000	0	0-0	0	0	0
Saunders, Tor	4	0	0	0	0	.000	0	.000	0	0-0	2	8	2
Total	23	50	54	154	334	.150	136	.407	18	4-5	12	59	12
Opponents	23	12	9	33	172	.070	71	.413	3	1-2	59	86	5

Legend
App	Appearances	Asst	Assists	Shot%	Shots to Goals
SOG	Shots on Goal	SOG%	Shots on Goal Percent	GW	Game Winning Goals
PK-Att	Penalty Kicks-Attempts	GA	Goals Against	SO	Shut Outs
	Team high

== MLS Draft ==
The following members of 2017 Akron Zips men's soccer team were selected in the 2018 MLS SuperDraft.

Player	Round	Pick	Position	MLS club	Ref.
João Moutinho	1	1	DF	Los Angeles FC	
Niko De Vera	2	31	DF	New York Red Bulls	
