= Mid-American Conference men's soccer tournament =

Mid-American Conference men's soccer tournament (defunct)
- Sport: College soccer
- Conference: Mid-American Conference
- Number of teams: 2 (in final season)
- Format: Single-elimination tournament
- Played: 1994–2019, 2021–2022
- Last contest: 2022
- Current champion: Western Michigan
- Most championships: Akron (15)
- TV partner: ESPN3
- Official website: getsomemaction.com/msoc

The Mid-American Conference men's soccer tournament was the conference championship tournament in soccer for the Mid-American Conference. The tournament was held every year from 1994 until 2019. It was a single-elimination tournament and seeding was based on regular season records. The winner, declared conference champion, received the conference's automatic bid to the NCAA Division I men's soccer championship.

Starting in 2020, the tournament was canceled, and the regular-season champion was declared the conference champion, which was intended to remain in effect until at least 2024. This was in part due to the COVID-19 pandemic. However, in 2021 the Conference resumed hosting the tournament.

The MAC discontinued sponsorship of men's soccer at the end of the 2022 season. Conference realignment in the 2020s had decimated MAC men's soccer, leaving it with only five members (four full members plus one single-sport affiliate) in 2022. With no prospect of adding the sixth member needed to preserve the conference's automatic bid to the NCAA tournament, the MAC shut down its league. In the final season, the tournament, which had featured four teams for its most recent editions, was reduced to a championship game featuring the top two teams in the conference standings.

Akron remains as the most winning team of the tournament with 15 titles.

== Winners ==
The following is a list of MAC Tournament winners:

Key

- (1) – Title number
- a.e.t. – Match went to extra time
- p – Match decided by a penalty shootout after extra time
- – Winning team won regular season

=== Finals ===
Ed.	Year	Champion	Score	Runner-up	Venue	City	MVP
1	1994	Miami (OH) (1)	3–1 (a.e.t.)	Bowling Green	Cub Cadet Field	Akron, Oh	Dan Creech (Miami)
2	1995	Bowling Green (1)	2–0	Akron	WMU Soccer Complex	Kalamazoo, Mi	Steve Klein (Bowling Green)
3	1996	Bowling Green (2)	4–0	Kentucky	Cochrane Stadium	Bowling Green, Oh	
4	1997	Bowling Green (3)	1–0	Akron	Miami Soccer Field	Oxford, Oh	
5	1998	Akron (1)	4–1	Bowling Green	Cub Cadet Field	Akron, Oh	Michael Apple (Akron)
6	1999	Kentucky (1)	2–1	Northern Illinois	UK Soccer Complex	Lexington, Ky	Lee Baker (Kentucky)
7	2000	Kentucky (2)	1–0	Bowling Green	Cochrane Stadium	Bowling Green, Oh	Ilkka Jäntti (Kentucky)
8	2001	Kentucky (3)	1–0 (a.e.t.)	Akron	UK Soccer Complex	Lexington, Ky	John Monebrake (Kentucky)
9	2002	Akron (2)	4–1	Bowling Green	Cochrane Stadium	Bowling Green, Oh	Kirk Harwat (Akron)
10	2003	Western Michigan (1)	5–0	Bowling Green	WMU Soccer Complex	Kalamazoo, Mi	Scott Duhl (Western Michigan)
12	2004	Akron (3)	6–1	Western Michigan	Cub Cadet Field	Akron, Oh	Alex Odwell (Akron)
13	2005	Akron (4)	0–0 (8–7 p)	Buffalo	Cub Cadet Field	Akron, Oh	Ross McKenzie (Akron)
14	2006	Northern Illinois (1)	1–0	Akron	NIU Soccer Complex	DeKalb, Il	Joe Zimka (Northern Illinois)
15	2007	Akron (5)	1–0 (a.e.t.)	Buffalo	Cub Cadet Field	Akron, Oh	Cory Sipos (Akron)
16	2008	Akron (6)	1–0 (a.e.t.)	Northern Illinois	Cub Cadet Field	Akron, Oh	Steve Zakuani (Akron)
17	2009	Akron (7)	2–1	Hartwick	Cub Cadet Field	Akron, Oh	Teal Bunbury (Akron)
18	2010	Akron (8)	4–0	Western Michigan	Cub Cadet Field	Akron, Oh	Darren Mattocks (Akron)
19	2011	Northern Illinois (2)	1–0	Western Michigan	Cub Cadet Field	Akron, Oh	Sean Totsch (Northern Illinois)
20	2012	Akron (9)	2–0	Northern Illinois	Cub Cadet Field	Akron, Oh	Scott Caldwell (Akron)
21	2013	Akron (10)	2–1	West Virginia	Cub Cadet Field	Akron, Oh	Aodhan Quinn (Akron)
22	2014	Akron (11)	2–1	Bowling Green	Cub Cadet Field	Akron, Oh	Adam Najem (Akron)
23	2015	Akron (12)	1–0	Buffalo	Cub Cadet Field	Akron, Oh	Adam Najem (Akron)
24	2016	Akron (13)	2–1	Buffalo	Cub Cadet Field	Akron, Oh	Nick Hinds (Akron)
25	2017	Akron (14)	3–1	Western Michigan	WMU Soccer Complex	Kalamazoo, Mi	Stuart Holthusen (Akron)
26	2018	Akron (15)	3–0	Western Michigan	Dlesk Stadium	Morgantown, WV	Marcel Zajac (Akron)
27	2019	West Virginia (1)	1–0	Bowling Green	Cub Cadet Field	Akron, Oh	Steven Tekesky (West Virginia)
–	2020	(No tournament held due to COVID-19 pandemic in the United States)					
28	2021	Northern Illinois (3)	2–1 (a.e.t.)	Georgia State	NIU Soccer Complex	DeKalb, Il	Nick Markanich (NIU)
29	2022	Western Michigan (2)	2–1	Akron	Cub Cadet Field	Akron, Oh	Charlie Sharp (Western Michigan)

== Performance by school ==
School	Titles	Winning years
Akron	15	1998, 2002, 2004, 2005, 2007, 2008, 2009, 2010, 2012, 2013, 2014, 2015, 2016, 2017, 2018
Bowling Green	3	1995, 1996, 1997
Kentucky	3	1999, 2000, 2001
NIU	3	2006, 2011, 2021
Western Michigan	2	2003, 2022
Miami†	1	1994
West Virginia	1	2019
TOTAL	27	

Italics indicate a school that was not a conference member in the MAC's final men's soccer season

† No longer sponsor men's soccer
