= Mid-American Conference Coach of the Year =

Mid-American Conference Coach of the Year may refer to:

- Mid-American Conference Football Coach of the Year
- Mid-American Conference Men's Soccer Coach of the Year
