= Mid-American Conference Men's Soccer Awards =

The Mid-American Conference Men's Soccer Awards are the annual awards given to the top coach, the best player, and the best freshman in the Mid-American Conference (MAC) during the NCAA Division I men's soccer season as voted on by the conference's head coaches.

== Player of the Year ==
- 1993 Paul Wilkinson, Akron
- 1994 Dan Creech, Miami †
- 1995 Dustin Swinehart, Miami †
- 1996 Steve Klein, Bowling Green
- 1997 Eirik Frederiksen, Northern Illinois
- 1998 Michael Apple, Akron
- 1999 Steve Butcher, Buffalo †
- 2000 Byron Carmichael, Marshall #
- 2001 Illka Jantti, Kentucky #
- 2002 Byron Carmichael, Marshall #
- 2003 Jamal Shteiwi, Kentucky #
- 2004 Jamal Shteiwi, Kentucky #
- 2005 Ross McKenzie, Akron
- 2006 Siniša Ubiparipović, Akron
- 2007 Cory Sipos, Akron
- 2008 Steve Zakuani, Akron
- 2009 Teal Bunbury Akron
- 2010 Darlington Nagbe, Akron
- 2011 Darren Mattocks, Akron
- 2012 Scott Caldwell, Akron
- 2013 Aodhan Quinn, Akron
- 2014 Andy Bevin, West Virginia
- 2015 Russell Cicerone, Buffalo †
- 2016 Adam Najem, Akron
- 2017 Brandon Bye, Western Michigan
- 2018 Joey Piatczyc, West Virginia
- 2019 Jorge Gonzalez, SIUE
- 2020 Nick Markanich, Northern Illinois
- 2021 Nick Markanich, Northern Illinois
- 2022 Daniel Nimick, Western Michigan

== Freshman of the Year ==
(Was Newcomer of the Year 1993–2013)

- 1993 Christin Handsor, Akron
- 1994 Jason Began, Bowling Green
- 1995 Justin Millard, Akron
- 1996 George Tomasso, Eastern Michigan †
- 1997 Norman Dutch, Marshall #
- 1998 Illka Jantti, Kentucky #
- 1999 Torbjorn Birkeland, Akron & Byron Carmichael, Marshall #
- 2000 Reece Richardson, Western Michigan
- 2001 John Monebrake, Kentucky #
- 2002 Kirk Harwat, Akron
- 2003 Riley O'Neill, Kentucky #
- 2004 Curt Zastrow, Northern Illinois
- 2005 Evan Bush, Akron
- 2006 Marcus McCarty, Northern Illinois
- 2007 Steve Zakuani, Akron
- 2008 Darlington Nagbe, Akron
- 2009 Zarek Valentin, Akron
- 2010 Darren Mattocks, Akron
- 2011 Wil Trapp, Akron
- 2012 Dillon Serna, Akron & Anthony Grant, Bowling Green
- 2013 Russell Cicerone, Buffalo †
- 2014 Joey Piatczyc, West Virginia
- 2015 Kevin Rodriguez, Northern Illinois
- 2016 Jonathan Lewis, Akron
- 2017 João Moutinho, Akron
- 2018 Nick Markanich, Northern Illinois
- 2019 Charlie Sharp, Western Michigan
- 2020 Harry Jolley, Northern Illinois
- 2021 Alberto Anaya, Bowling Green
- 2022 Carson Hodgson, Western Michigan

== Gary V. Palmisano Coach of the Year ==
(Named for the Bowling Green goalkeeper, assistant coach, and head coach from 1978–92 and 1994 until his untimely death that year.)

- 1993 Ken Lolla, Akron & Bobby Kramig, Miami †
- 1994 Bobby Kramig, Miami †
- 1995 Ken Lolla, Akron
- 1996 Mel Mahler, Bowling Green
- 1997 Ian Collins, Kentucky #
- 1998 Ken Lolla, Akron
- 1999 Ian Collins, Kentucky #
- 2000 Bob Gray, Marshall #
- 2001 Ian Collins, Kentucky #
- 2002 Mel Mahler, Bowling Green
- 2003 Chris Karwoski, Western Michigan
- 2004 Steve Simmons, Northern Illinois
- 2005 Ken Lolla, Akron
- 2006 Steve Simmons, Northern Illinois
- 2007 Caleb Porter, Akron
- 2008 Caleb Porter, Akron
- 2009 Caleb Porter, Akron
- 2010 Caleb Porter, Akron
- 2011 Caleb Porter, Akron
- 2012 Caleb Porter, Akron
- 2013 John Scott, Hartwick #
- 2014 Marlon LeBlanc, West Virginia
- 2015 Chad Wiseman, Western Michigan
- 2016 Eric Nichols, Bowling Green
- 2017 Chad Wiseman, Western Michigan
- 2018 Marlon LeBlanc, West Virginia
- 2019 Jared Embick, Akron
- 2020 Eric Nichols, Bowling Green
- 2021 Ryan Swan, Northern Illinois
- 2022 Jared Embick, Akron

== Goalkeeper of the Year ==
- 2022 Brendan Graves/Hunter Morse, Bowling Green/Western Michigan

NOTES:

- # = Team no longer competes in the MAC.
- † = MAC school no longer fields a men's soccer team.
