= 2017 Western Michigan Broncos men's soccer team =

Season of football team

2017 Western Michigan Broncos men's soccer

MAC Regular Season Champions

NCAA Tournament, Third Round
- Conference: Mid-American Conference
- U. Soc. Coaches poll: No. 9
- TopDrawerSoccer.com: No. 11
- Record: 17–4–1 (5–0–0 MAC)
- Head coach: Chad Wiseman (5th season)
- Assistant coaches: Josh Ross (4th season); Shane Lyons (2nd season); Marc Frankland (4th season)
- Captain: Brandon Bye
- Home stadium: WMU Soccer Complex

2017 Mid-American Conference men's soccer standings
	Conf.					Overall
Team	W		L		T	W		L		T
No. 9 Western Michigan +	5	–	0	–	0	17	–	4	–	1
No. 3 Akron ‡	4	–	1	–	0	18	–	4	–	2
SIU Edwardsville	2	–	3	–	0	7	–	10	–	1
West Virginia	1	–	2	–	2	9	–	6	–	4
Bowling Green	1	–	3	–	1	7	–	9	–	1
Northern Illinois	0	–	4	–	1	3	–	11	–	1
‡ – 2017 MAC Tournament champion + – Invited to the 2017 NCAA Division I Men's Soccer Championship; As of December 13, 2017; Rankings from United Soccer Coaches

The 2017 Western Michigan Broncos men's soccer team represented Western Michigan University during the 2017 NCAA Division I men's soccer season. It was the 47th season of the university fielding a program. It was the program's fifth season with Chad Wiseman as head coach. The Broncos played their home matches at WMU Soccer Complex.

The 2017 season has been, by far, the most successful season in program history. The program won their first conference regular season title in their 47-year history, and posted the most victories in program history. The Broncos achieved their first ever United Soccer Coaches national ranking since 2003 and climbed into the Top 10 for the first time in their program's history. The team beat three ranked opponents during the season: Butler, Michigan and Akron.

== Coaching staff ==
Position	Staff
Athletic director	Kathy Beauregard
Head coach	Chad Wiseman
Assistant coach	Josh Ross
Assistant coach	Shane Lyons
Assistant coach	Marc Frankland
Assistant athletic trainer	Danny Walen
Director of operations	Doug Raak
Strength and conditioning coach	Tim Hermann

== Schedule ==
Date Time, TV	Rank^{#}	Opponent^{#}	Result	Record	Site City, State
Non-conference regular season
August 25*		LIU Brooklyn	W 3–2	1–0–0	WMU Soccer Complex (421); Kalamazoo, MI
August 27*		Stetson	W 5–0	2–0–0	WMU Soccer Complex (650); Kalamazoo, MI
September 1*		at Eastern Illinois	T 0–0 ^{2OT}	2–0–1	Lakeside Soccer Field (98); Charleston, IL
September 4*		Cincinnati	W 2–0	3–0–1	WMU Soccer Complex (850); Kalamazoo, MI
September 8*		at No. 15 Butler	W 3–2	4–0–1	Bud and Jackie Sellick Bowl (688); Indianapolis, IN
September 10*		at Drake	W 2–1	5–0–1	Cownie Sports Complex (144); Des Moines, IA
September 13*	No. 24	at Oakland	W 2–1	6–0–1	Oakland Soccer Field (472); Rochester, MI
September 17*	No. 24	Dayton	W 1–0	7–0–1	WMU Soccer Complex (750); Kalamazoo, MI
September 20*	No. 12	No. 22 Michigan	W 1–0	8–0–1	WMU Soccer Complex (2,317); Kalamazoo, MI
September 23*	No. 12	at UMBC	W 2–0	9–0–1	Retriever Soccer Park (977); Baltimore, MD
September 29*	No. 9	at Portland	L 4–1	9–1–1	Merlo Field (1,440); Portland, OR
October 4*	No. 12	No. 6 Michigan State	L 1–0	9–2–1	WMU Soccer Complex (3,422); Kalamazoo, MI
MAC regular season
October 7	No. 12	Akron	W 1–0	10–2–1 (1–0–0)	WMU Soccer Complex (1,221); Kalamazoo, MI
October 14	No. 13	at Northern Illinois	W 5–0	11–2–1 (2–0–0)	NIU Soccer Complex (104); DeKalb, IL
October 17*	No. 8	Green Bay	W 3–0	12–2–1	WMU Soccer Complex (523); Kalamazoo, MI
October 20	No. 8	at West Virginia	W 1–0 ^{OT}	13–2–1 (3–0–0)	Dick Dlesk Soccer Stadium (852); Morgantown, WV
October 28	No. 6	SIU Edwardsville	W 1–0	14–2–1 (4–0–0)	WMU Soccer Complex (594); Kalamazoo, MI
November 5	No. 5	Bowling Green	W 1–0	15–2–1 (5–0–0)	WMU Soccer Complex (211); Kalamazoo, MI
MAC Tournament
November 10; 2:00 pm	(1) No. 4	(4) West Virginia; Semifinals	W 1–0	16–2–1	WMU Soccer Complex (532); Kalamazoo, MI
November 12; 1:00 pm	(1) No. 4	(2) No. 7 Akron; Final	L 3–1	16–3–1	WMU Soccer Complex (650); Kalamazoo, MI
NCAA Tournament
November 19; 1:00 pm	(10) No. 6	Albany; Second round	W 2–0	17–3–1	WMU Soccer Complex (731); Kalamazoo, MI
November 25; 6:00 pm	(10) No. 6	(7) No. 15 Michigan State; Third round	L 2–1	17–4–1	DeMartin Soccer Complex (1,558); East Lansing, MI
*Non-conference game. ^{#}Rankings from United Soccer Coaches poll. (#) Tournament seedings in parentheses.

== Rankings ==
The following table lists WMU's movement in the 2017 United Soccer Coaches poll, the TopDrawerSoccer.com poll, the Unites Soccer Coaches Great Lake regional poll and the Ratings Percentage Index (RPI) computer ranking.

Ranking movements Legend: ██ Increase in ranking ██ Decrease in ranking — = Not ranked RV = Received votes
	Week													
Poll	Pre	1	2	3	4	5	6	7	8	9	10	11	12	Final
United Soccer Coaches	—	RV	—	24	12	9	12	13	8	6	5	4	6	9
TopDrawerSoccer.com	—	—	—	—	—	RV	11	20	8	9	7	6	7	11
Great Lakes Regional	Not released	3	7	3	1	1	2	2	1	1	1	1	2	Not released
RPI	Not released						11	9	11	6	8	8	8	9

The TopDrawerSoccer.com poll releases rankings during the NCAA Tournament. WMU was ranked as high as No. 4 following their Second Round victory over Albany.

== MLS Draft ==
The following members of 2017 Western Michigan Broncos men's soccer team were selected in the 2018 MLS SuperDraft.

Player	Round	Pick	Position	MLS club	Ref.
Brandon Bye	1	8	DF	New England Revolution	
Drew Shepherd	2	46	GK	Toronto FC	
