= 2017 MAC men's soccer tournament =

- Classification: Division I
- Teams: 4
- Matches: 3
- Site: WMU Soccer Complex; Kalamazoo, MI
- Champions: Akron (14th title)
MAC men's soccer tournament
«2016	2018»

The 2017 Mid-American Conference men's soccer tournament was the 24th edition of the tournament. It determined the Mid-American Conference's automatic berth into the 2017 NCAA Division I Men's Soccer Championship. The tournament was held November 10 & 12 on the campus of Western Michigan University, the regular season champion.

== Qualification ==
2017 Mid-American Conference men's soccer standings
	Conf.					Overall
Team	W		L		T	W		L		T
No. 9 Western Michigan +	5	–	0	–	0	17	–	4	–	1
No. 3 Akron ‡	4	–	1	–	0	18	–	4	–	2
SIU Edwardsville	2	–	3	–	0	7	–	10	–	1
West Virginia	1	–	2	–	2	9	–	6	–	4
Bowling Green	1	–	3	–	1	7	–	9	–	1
Northern Illinois	0	–	4	–	1	3	–	11	–	1
‡ – 2017 MAC Tournament champion + – Invited to the 2017 NCAA Division I Men's Soccer Championship; As of December 13, 2017; Rankings from United Soccer Coaches

The top four teams in the Mid-American Conference based on their conference regular season records qualified for the tournament.

== Bracket ==
Semifinals
1	Western Michigan	1
4	West Virginia	0
2	Akron	2
3	SIU Edwardsville	1

Final
1	Western Michigan	1
2	Akron	3

== Schedule ==
=== Semifinals ===
November 10	Western Michigan	1–0	West Virginia	Kalamazoo, Michigan
2:00 PM EST	McIntosh 75'	Report		Stadium: WMU Soccer Complex; Attendance: 532; Referee: Dimitar Chavdarov

November 10	Akron	2–1 (a.e.t.)	SIU Edwardsville	Kalamazoo, Michigan
11:00 AM EST	Harter 90'; Holthusen 106'	Report	Solawa 56'	Stadium: WMU Soccer Complex; Attendance: 479; Referee: Christopher Koloffon

=== MAC Championship ===
November 12	Western Michigan	1–3	Akron	Kalamazoo, Michigan
		[ Report]		Stadium: WMU Soccer Complex

== Tournament Best XI ==
Player	School	Position
Stuart Holthusen	Akron	Forward
Manuel Cordeiro	Akron	Midfielder
João Moutinho	Akron	Defender
Sam Gainford	Akron	Forward
Giuseppe Vitale	Western Michigan	Midfielder
Anthony Bowie	Western Michigan	Midfielder
Connor McNulty	Western Michigan	Midfielder
Johan DePicker	SIUE	Defender
Devyn Jambga	SIUE	Forward
Louis Thomas	West Virginia	Defender
Pascal Derwaritsch	West Virginia	Defender
