= 2017 Stanford Cardinal men's soccer team =

American college soccer season

2017 Stanford Cardinal men's soccer

National Champions

Pac-12 Champions

NCAA Tournament, Final, W 1–0 vs. Indiana
- Conference: Pac-12 Conference

Ranking
- Coaches: No. 1
- U. Soc. Coaches poll: No. 1
- TopDrawerSoccer.com: No. 1
- Record: 15–2–1 (9–0–1 Pac-12)
- Head coach: Jeremy Gunn (6th season)
- Assistant coaches: Oige Kennedy (2nd season); Charles Rodriguez (2nd season); Collin Audley (1st season)
- Captains: Tomas Hilliard-Arce; Corey Baird; Drew Skundrich
- Home stadium: Laird Q. Cagan Stadium

2017 Pac-12 Conference men's soccer standings
	Conf.					Overall
Team	W		L		T	W		L		T
No. 1 Stanford ‡	9	–	0	–	1	19	–	2	–	2
California +	6	–	4	–	0	11	–	7	–	0
Washington +	5	–	4	–	1	12	–	7	–	1
UCLA	4	–	6	–	0	7	–	10	–	1
Oregon State	4	–	6	–	0	7	–	11	–	0
San Diego State	1	–	9	–	0	6	–	13	–	0
‡ – Conference champion + – Invited to the 2017 NCAA Division I Men's Soccer Championship; As of December 13, 2017; Rankings from United Soccer Coaches

The 2017 Stanford Cardinal men's soccer team represented Stanford University during the 2017 NCAA Division I men's soccer season. It is the 44th season of the university fielding a program. It the program's sixth season with Jeremy Gunn as head coach. The Cardinal played their home matches at Cagan Stadium.

The Cardinal's 2017 season saw the Cardinal threepeat and win the NCAA Division I Men's Soccer Tournament for the third-consecutive year. The Cardinal also won the Pac-12 Conference championship for the fourth consecutive year. Stanford's NCAA success marked only the second time in NCAA history that a Division I program won the Men's Soccer Championship for three straight seasons. The last feat was Bruce Arena's Virginia teams that won the NCAA tournament from 1991 through 1994.

== Roster ==
Updated: November 11, 2017

Note: Flags indicate national team as defined under FIFA eligibility rules; some limited exceptions apply. Players may hold more than one non-FIFA nationality.

No.	Pos.	Nation	Player
1	GK	BEL	Nico Corti
2	FW	USA	Foster Langsdorf
3	DF	USA	Tanner Beason
4	DF	USA	Tomas Hilliard-Arce (captain)
5	DF	USA	Carson Vom Steeg
6	DF	EGY	Adam Mosharrafa
7	MF	USA	Bryce Marion
8	MF	USA	Jared Gilbey
9	FW	USA	Arda Bulut
10	MF	USA	Corey Baird (captain)
11	MF	USA	Amir Bashti
12	MF	USA	Drew Skundrich (captain)
13	MF	JPN	Kei Tomozawa
14	FW	USA	Zach Ryan

No.	Pos.	Nation	Player
15	FW	USA	Rhys de Sota
16	DF	USA	Andrew Aprahamian
17	FW	USA	Charlie Wehan
18	MF	USA	Marc Joshua
19	FW	USA	Jack O'Brien
20	GK	USA	Charlie Furrer
21	DF	USA	Collin Liberty
22	MF	FRA	Logan Panchot
23	MF	USA	Sam Werner
24	MF	USA	Kyle Casey
27	MF	COL	Emanuel Pinilla
29	MF	USA	Derek Waldeck
30	GK	ENG	Andrew Thomas
31	GK	ESP	Eduardo Fabre

== Coaching staff ==
Position	Staff
Athletic director	Bernard Muir
Head coach	Jeremy Gunn
Assistant coach	Oige Kennedy
Assistant coach	Charles Rodriguez
Volunteer Assistant Coach	Collin Audley
Assistant Athletic Trainer	Heather M. Owen
Academic Counselor	Melissa Schellberg
Strength & Conditioning Staff	Justin Police

== Schedule and results ==
Date Time, TV	Rank^{#}	Opponent^{#}	Result	Record	Site (Attendance) City, State
Preseason
August 13*; 1:00 p.m.	No. 1	Portland	W 3–0		Cagan Stadium; Stanford, CA
August 19*; 7:00 p.m.	No. 1	Pacific	W 1–0		Cagan Stadium; Stanford, CA
Non-conference regular season
August 25*; 5:00 p.m.	No. 1	at San Jose State; Bill Walsh Legacy Game	W 4–0	1–0–0	Spartan Soccer Complex (1,028); San Jose, CA
September 1*; 7:00 p.m., P12N	No. 1	No. 23 Creighton	W 3–0	2–0–0	Cagan Stadium (1,916); Stanford, CA
September 3*; 5:00 p.m., YouTube	No. 1	Northeastern	W 1–0	3–0–0	Cagan Stadium (613); Stanford, CA
September 7*; 8:00 p.m., P12N	No. 1	No. 19 SMU	W 3–1	4–0–0	Cagan Stadium (459); Stanford, CA
September 9*; 7:00 p.m., GoCardinal.com	No. 1	No. 20 Tulsa	L 0–2	4–1–0	Cagan Stadium (459); Stanford, CA
September 15*; 7:00 p.m., GoCardinal.com	No. 5	San Francisco	W 1–0	5–1–0	Cagan Stadium (690); Stanford, CA
September 17*; 1:00 p.m., P12N	No. 5	Yale	W 3–1	6–1–0	Cagan Stadium (832); Stanford, CA
September 23*; 2:00 p.m., A10N	No. 5	at Saint Louis	L 0–2	6–2–0	Hermann Stadium (3,326); St. Louis, MO
Pac-12 Conference regular season
September 28; 7:00 p.m., mtn.	No. 11	at San Diego State	W 5–0	7–2–0 (1–0–0)	SDSU Sports Deck (520); San Diego, CA
October 1; 5:00 p.m., P12N	No. 11	at UCLA	W 1–0	8–2–0 (2–0–0)	Drake Stadium (3,941); Los Angeles, CA
October 8; 3:00 p.m., P12N	No. 8	at No. 24 California; Big Game	W 3–0	9–2–0 (3–0–0)	Edwards Stadium (1,166); Berkeley, CA
October 12; 8:00 p.m., P12N	No. 8	No. 19 Washington	T 1–1 ^{2OT}	9–2–1 (3–0–1)	Cagan Stadium (1,499); Stanford, CA
October 15; 11:00 a.m.	No. 6	Oregon State	W 1–0	10–2–1 (4–0–1)	Cagan Stadium (1,242); Stanford, CA
October 19; 8:00 p.m., P12N	No. 6	at No. 21 Washington	W 2–1	11–2–1 (5–0–1)	Husky Soccer Stadium (667); Seattle, WA
October 22; 1:00 p.m., P12N	No. 5	at Oregon State	W 3–0	12–2–1 (6–0–1)	Lorenz Field (312); Corvallis, OR
November 2; 5:30 p.m., P12N	No. 4	UCLA	W 5–1	13–2–1 (7–0–1)	Cagan Stadium (2,044); Stanford, CA
November 5; 5:00 p.m., P12N	No. 4	San Diego State	W 4–0	14–2–1 (8–0–1)	Cagan Stadium (1,142); Stanford, CA
November 9; 7:00 p.m., P12N	No. 3	No. 23 California	W 1–0	15–2–1 (9–0–1)	Cagan Stadium (1,474); Stanford, CA
NCAA Tournament
November 19*; 5:00 pm, P12N	(9) No. 4	Pacific; Second Round	T 0–0 (W 4–1 PK) ^{2OT}	15–2–2	Cagan Stadium (1,405); Stanford, CA
November 26*; 5:00 pm, P12N	(9) No. 4	No. 25 Coastal Carolina; Third Round	W 2–0	16–2–2	Cagan Stadium (924); Stanford, CA
December 2*; 7:00 pm, ESPN3	(9) No. 4	at (1) No. 1 Wake Forest; Quarterfinals	W 2–0	17–2–2	Spry Stadium (4,628); Winston-Salem, NC
December 8*; 3:00 p.m., ESPNU	(9) No. 4	vs. (4) No. 5 Akron; College Cup, Semifinals	W 2–0	18–2–2	Talen Energy Stadium (4,948); Chester, PA
December 10; 9:00 a.m., ESPN2	(9) No. 4	vs. (2) No. 2 Indiana; National Championship	W 1–0 ^{2OT}	19–2–2	Talen Energy Stadium (5,764); Chester, PA
*Non-conference game. ^{#}Rankings from United Soccer Coaches. (#) Tournament seedings in parentheses. All times are in Pacific Time.

== Professional departures ==
=== MLS Draft Picks ===
The following members of 2017 Stanford Cardinal men's soccer team were selected in the 2018 MLS SuperDraft.

Player	Round	Pick	Position	MLS club	Ref.
Tomas Hilliard-Arce	1	2	DF	LA Galaxy	
Drew Skundrich	2	40	MF	LA Galaxy	

=== Homegrown contracts ===
The following members of the 2017 Stanford Cardinal men's soccer team signed homegrown contracts with their academy clubs.

Player	Position	MLS club	Ref.
Corey Baird	FW	Real Salt Lake	
Foster Langsdorf	FW	Portland Timbers	
