= João Moutinho (footballer, born 1998) =

Portuguese footballer

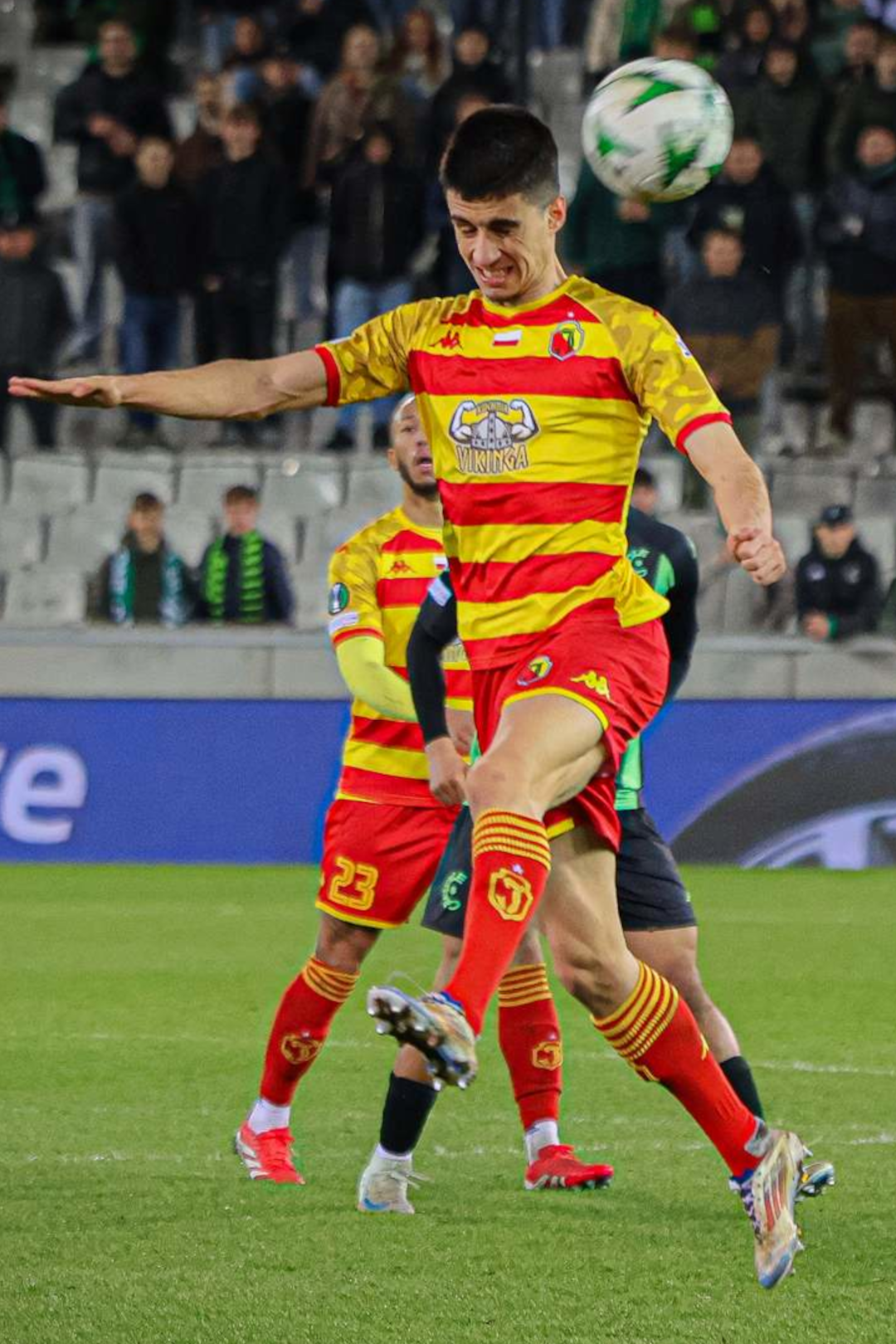
- Moutinho in 2025 with Jagiellonia Białystok

Personal information
- Full name: João Gervásio Bragança Moutinho
- Date of birth: 12 January 1998 (age 28)
- Place of birth: Lisbon, Portugal
- Height: 1.83 m (6 ft 0 in)
- Position: Defender

Team information
- Current team: Lech Poznań
- Number: 4

Youth career
- 2008–2017: Sporting CP

College career
Years	Team	Apps	(Gls)
2017	Akron Zips	24	(3)

Senior career*
Years	Team	Apps	(Gls)
2018	Los Angeles FC	14	(1)
2019–2022	Orlando City	72	(2)
2023–2025	Spezia	9	(0)
2024–2025	→ Jagiellonia Białystok (loan)	28	(0)
2025–	Lech Poznań	13	(0)
- * Club domestic league appearances and goals as of 10:10, 29 August 2026 (UTC)

João Gervásio Bragança Moutinho (born 12 January 1998) is a Portuguese professional footballer who plays as a defender for Ekstraklasa club Lech Poznań. Moutinho usually is employed as a left-back, although he has also been used as a centre-back.

Moutinho played one season of college soccer for the Akron Zips men's soccer program during the 2017 NCAA Division I men's soccer season. He appeared in all 24 matches for the Zips, and was named a first-team All-American by United Soccer Coaches.

He was the first-overall selection of the 2018 MLS SuperDraft, going to expansion club Los Angeles FC. After one season, he was traded to Orlando City, where he won the U.S. Open Cup in 2022.

== Career ==
=== Youth and college ===
Moutinho joined the Sporting CP's Youth Academy in 2008, when he joined the U-10 squad. Moutinho remained with the squad through the U-19's. In 2017, Moutinho signed a National Letter of Intent to play for the Akron Zips men's soccer program for the 2017 season.

While at Akron, Moutinho started in all 24 matches, scoring three and dishing out five assists. The season saw the Zips win the 2017 MAC Men's Soccer Tournament, and reach the College Cup (semi-finals) of the 2017 NCAA Division I Men's Soccer Tournament. At the end of the season, he earned two national distinctions, being named a first-team All-American by United Soccer Coaches, and earned the National Freshman of the Year Award by TopDrawer Soccer. Conference-wise, Moutinho earned the MAC Freshman of the Year Award, and was named to the All-MAC first team.

At the end of his freshman season, Moutinho signed a Generation Adidas contract with Major League Soccer, making him eligible for the 2018 MLS SuperDraft. There, Moutinho was the first overall selection of the draft, signed by expansion franchise, Los Angeles FC.

=== Professional career ===
==== Los Angeles FC ====
On 8 January 2018, Moutinho was one of six recipients of a Generation Adidas contract with Major League Soccer. Eleven days later at the 2018 MLS SuperDraft in Philadelphia, he was the first-overall selection, joining expansion team Los Angeles FC.

He made his professional debut on 5 March in LAFC's first MLS game, playing the full 90 minutes in a 1–0 win at the Seattle Sounders FC. On 7 April in a 5–0 loss at Atlanta United FC, he was sent off in added time for handling the ball in the penalty area. He scored his first professional goal on 9 June, the winner in a 4–3 victory at fellow Californians the San Jose Earthquakes, in the seventh minute of added time. The new club came third in the Western Conference and were eliminated in the first round of the 2018 MLS Cup Playoffs 3–2 at home to Real Salt Lake.

==== Orlando City ====
On 11 December 2018 he was traded to Orlando City in exchange for Mohamed El-Monir. He made his debut for the team on 23 March, starting in a 1–0 away win at New York Red Bulls and assisting the only goal by Sacha Kljestan. On 31 July 2020, Moutinho scored his first goal for the club, a 90th-minute equaliser against his former club Los Angeles FC to force a penalty shootout in the MLS is Back Tournament quarter-finals. Orlando won the ensuing shootout.

Moutinho scored his first regular-season goal for Orlando on 2 April 2022 in a 4–2 home loss to Los Angeles. On 7 September, he played in the 2022 U.S. Open Cup Final, a 3–0 win over Sacramento Republic FC.

==== Spezia ====
On 1 December 2022, Moutinho signed a 3 1/2-year contract at Italian Serie A club Spezia, effective from the turn of the year. He made his debut on 4 January in a 2–2 home draw with Atalanta as a 67th-minute substitute for Arkadiusz Reca. Twenty-three days later in his fourth game, he suffered a left foot malleolus injury and was ruled out for the rest of the season.

==== Loan to Jagiellonia ====
On 9 July 2024, Moutinho moved on a season-long loan with an option to buy to Polish defending champions Jagiellonia Białystok. He received a number 44 shirt. He made his Ekstraklasa debut on 19 July 2024 in a 2–0 win over Puszcza Niepołomice, coming off the bench in the 62nd minute, replacing Aurélien Nguiamba.

==== Lech Poznań ====
On 18 July 2025, Moutinho left Spezia to join another Polish top-flight side Lech Poznań on a two-year contract.

== Career statistics ==
=== College ===
Appearances and goals by club, season and competition
School	Season	NCAA Regular Season				MAC Tournament			NCAA Tournament			Total		
School	Season	Division	Apps	Goals	Assists	Apps	Goals	Assists	Apps	Goals	Assists	Apps	Goals	Assists
University of Akron	2017	Div. I	18	3	5	2	0	0	4	0	0	22	0	1
NCAA Total			18	3	5	2	0	0	4	0	0	22	3	5

=== Club ===
As of match played 1 August 2026

Appearances and goals by club, season and competition
Club	Season	League			National cup (Note: Includes U.S. Open Cup, Coppa Italia, Polish Cup)		Continental		Playoffs		Other		Total	
Club	Season	Division	Apps	Goals	Apps	Goals	Apps	Goals	Apps	Goals	Apps	Goals	Apps	Goals
Los Angeles FC	2018	MLS	14	1	1	0	—		0	0	—		15	1
Orlando City SC	2019	MLS	16	0	2	0	—		—		—		18	0
Orlando City SC	2020	MLS	8	0	—		—		0	0	4 (Note: Appearances in MLS is Back Tournament knockout stage.)	1	12	1
Orlando City SC	2021	MLS	20	0	—		—		0	0	1 (Note: Appearances in Leagues Cup)	0	21	0
Orlando City SC	2022	MLS	28	2	5	0	—		1	0	—		34	2
Orlando City SC	Total		72	2	7	0	—		1	0	5	1	85	3
Spezia	2022–23	Serie A	4	0	1	0	—		—		—		5	0
Spezia	2023–24	Serie B	5	0	1	0	—		—		—		6	0
Spezia	Total		9	0	2	0	—		—		—		11	0
Jagiellonia (loan)	2024–25	Ekstraklasa	28	0	1	0	15 (Note: Four appearances in UEFA Champions League, two appearances in UEFA Europa League, nine appearances in UEFA Conference League)	0	—		1 (Note: Appearance in Polish Super Cup)	0	45	0
Lech Poznań	2025–26	Ekstraklasa	12	0	2	0	10 (Note: Three appearances in UEFA Champions League, two appearances in UEFA Europa League, five appearances in UEFA Conference League)	0	—		—		24	0
Lech Poznań	2026–27	Ekstraklasa	1	0	0	0	0	0	—		0	0	1	0
Lech Poznań	Total		13	0	2	0	10	0	—		0	0	25	0
Career totals			136	3	13	0	25	0	1	0	6	1	181	4

== Honours ==
Akron Zips

- 2017 MAC Men's Soccer Tournament champions

Orlando City

- U.S. Open Cup: 2022

Jagiellonia Białystok

- Polish Super Cup: 2024

Lech Poznań

- Ekstraklasa: 2025–26

Individual

- MAC Men's Soccer Freshman of the Year: 2017
- United Soccer Coaches First-Team All-America: 2017
- TopDrawer Soccer National Freshman of the Year Award: 2017
