= Jared Embick =

American soccer player and coach

Current position
- Title: Manager
- Team: Akron Zips

Biographical details
- Born: September 3, 1978 (age 47)

Playing career
- 1996–1999: Indiana Wesleyan Wildcats

Coaching career (HC unless noted)
- 2003–2006: Missouri Baptist Spartans
- 2007–2012: Akron Zips (assistant)
- 2013–present: Akron Zips

Jared Embick is an American college soccer coach, currently serving as head coach of the Akron Zips men's soccer team.

== Career ==
Embick played college soccer at Indiana Wesleyan University. He was the head coach for Missouri Baptist University from 2003 and 2006. He became as assistant at Akron in 2007. Embick was named the national assistant coach of the year for the 2010 season. He became Akron's head coach following the 2012 season. Akron lost in the second round of the NCAA Tournament in 2013. In July 2015, Embick's contract was extended through the 2018 season. Embick led Akron to the 2015, 2017, and 2018 College Cups.

== College head coaching record ==
Record table
Season	Team	Overall	Conference	Standing	Postseason
Missouri Baptist University (American Midwest Conference) (2003–2006)
2003	Missouri Baptist		5–2–0	T–2nd	
2004	Missouri Baptist		5–2–0	3rd	
2005	Missouri Baptist	13–4–1	6–0–1	1st	
2006	Missouri Baptist	10–6–2	5–2–0	T–2nd	
Missouri Baptist:		47–21–8 (.671)			
Akron Zips (Mid-American Conference) (2013–2022)
2013	Akron	17–4–1	5–1–0	1st	NCAA 2nd Round
2014	Akron	13–6–2	4–1–0	1st	NCAA 1st Round
2015	Akron	18–3–3	4–0–1	1st	NCAA Semifinal
2016	Akron	13–6–3	3–1–1	1st	NCAA 2nd round
2017	Akron	18–4–2	4–1–0	2nd	NCAA Semifinal
2018	Akron	15–7–2	1–2–1	4th	NCAA Final
2019	Akron	6–10–2	4–0–1	1st	
2020	Akron	4–4–2	0–0–0		
2021	Akron	9–6–3	2–3–1	6th	NCAA First Round
2022	Akron	11–4–5	5–0–3	1st	NCAA Second Round
Akron Zips (Big East Conference) (2023–present)
2023	Akron	9–2–7	2–1–5	3rd (Midwest)	
2024	Akron	12–5–4	7–0–1	1st (Midwest)	NCAA Second Round
Akron:		145–61–36 (.674)			
Total:		192–82–44 (.673)			
National champion Postseason invitational champion Conference regular season champion Conference regular season and conference tournament champion Division regular season champion Division regular season and conference tournament champion Conference tournament champion

Awards and achievements
Preceded by Colin Clarke	NSCAA Assistant Coach of the Year; 2010	Succeeded by Jeff Negalha
