= Niko de Vera =

American Filipino professional soccer player

Niko De Vera
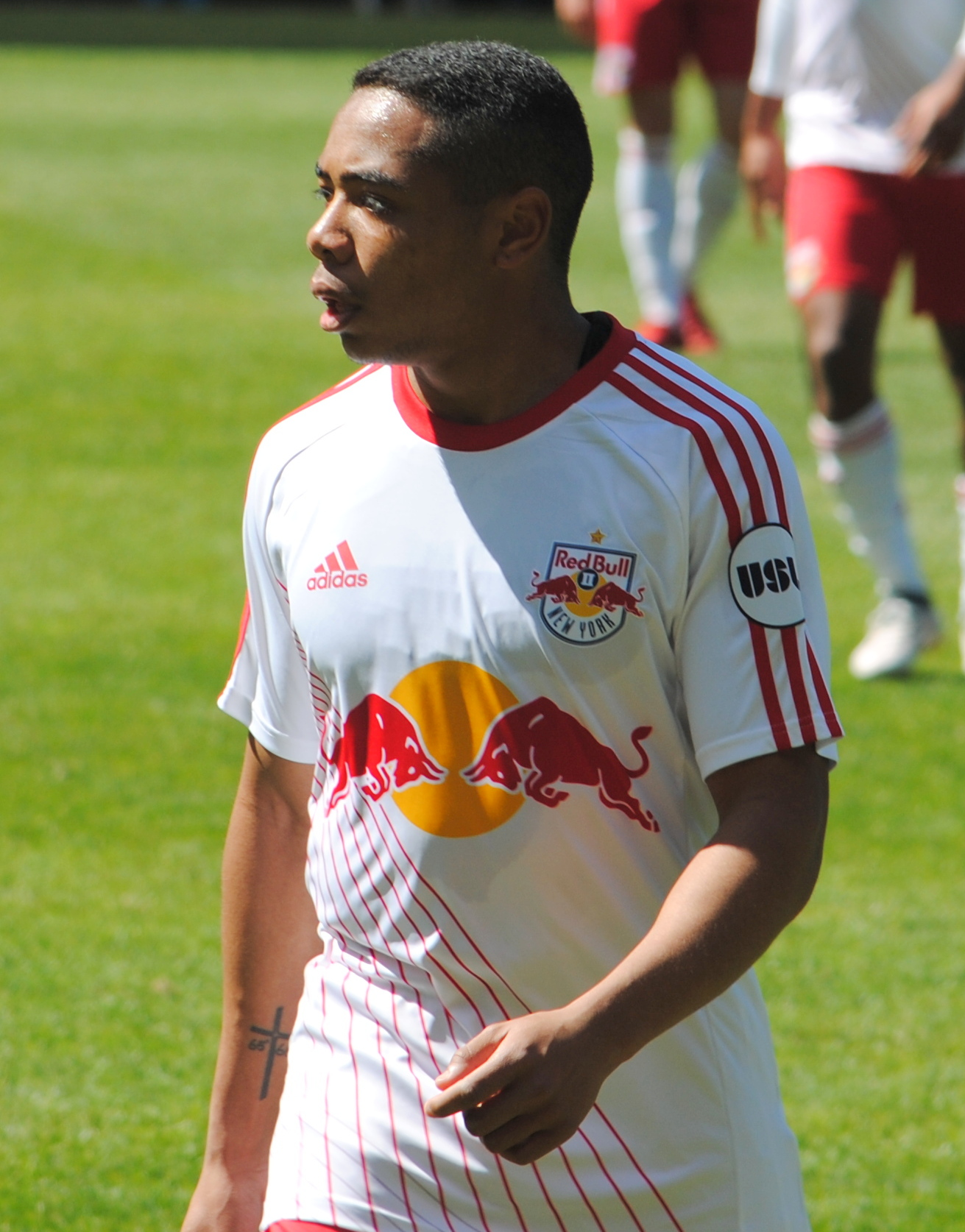

Personal information
- Full name: Niko Antonio Berry De Vera
- Date of birth: July 23, 1996 (age 30)
- Place of birth: Vancouver, Washington, United States
- Height: 1.70 m (5 ft 7 in)
- Position: Left back

Team information
- Current team: Retired

Youth career
- 2013–2014: Portland Timbers

College career
Years	Team	Apps	(Gls)
2014–2017	Akron Zips	60	(1)

Senior career*
Years	Team	Apps	(Gls)
2015–2017	Portland Timbers U23s	29	(0)
2018	New York Red Bulls	27	(0)
2019–2020	Portland Timbers	0	(0)

International career
2019–	Philippines	1	(0)
- * Club domestic league appearances and goals as of 19 April 2021

Niko Antonio Berry De Vera (born July 23, 1996) is an American professional football player who played as a defender.

== Career ==
=== Youth and collegiate ===
De Vera began his career in the youth academy of Portland Timbers in 2013. He made his professional debut in 2013 for the Timbers reserves at age 15. He also played four years of college soccer at the University of Akron between 2014 and 2017, appearing in 60 matches and scoring one goal and recording seven assists. While wearing the captains armband, he sent the zips to the final 4 scoring the winning penalty kick against Louisville.

While in college, De Vera also appeared for Premier Development League side Portland Timbers U23s.

=== New York Red Bulls ===
On January 19, 2018, De Vera was drafted in the second-round (31st overall) during the 2018 MLS SuperDraft by New York Red Bulls. On March 15, 2018, De Vera signed with New York Red Bulls. He made his professional debut on March 17, 2018, for United Soccer League side New York Red Bulls II, starting in a 2–1 win over Toronto FC II.

=== Portland Timbers 2 ===
De Vera joined USL Championship side Portland Timbers 2 on January 30, 2019. Timbers 2 opted to stop operating following the 2020 season.

== International career ==
De Vera was pre-called up by the Philippines in August 2019.

In October 2019, De Vera received a call-up for the Philippines, making the final 18 roster ahead of the 2022 FIFA World Cup qualifiers against China.

== Career statistics ==
As of 2 September 2020

Club	Season	League		MLS Cup		US Open Cup		CONCACAF		Total	
Club	Season	Apps	Goals	Apps	Goals	Apps	Goals	Apps	Goals	Apps	Goals
New York Red Bulls II	2018	27	0	0	0	0	0	0	0	27	0
