= Eric Nichols =

American soccer coach

Personal information
- Positions: Midfielder; right-back

Team information
- Current team: Bowling Green

College career
| Years | Team | Apps | (Gls) |
| 1990 | Ohio State Buckeyes | | |

Senior career*
| Years | Team | Apps | (Gls) |
- Columbus Xoggz
- Indiana Blast
- Columbus Invaders

Managerial career
- 2000–2003: Ohio Wesleyan (assistant)
- 2004–2007: Ohio Dominican Panthers
- 2007–2008: Columbus Crew U-18
- 2008: Davidson Wildcats (assistant)
- 2009–: Bowling Green Falcons
- * Club domestic league appearances and goals

Eric Nichols is the head men's soccer coach at Bowling Green State University. He has held that position since February 17, 2009, and has posted a 3–12–3 record in his first season with the Falcons. He previously served as an assistant coach at Davidson College. Before that, he was head coach at Ohio Dominican University from 2004 to 2007. From 2000 to 2003, he was an assistant coach at Ohio Wesleyan University. Eric Nichols has a wife and three kids.

He played collegiate soccer at Ohio State University. He played professionally for the Columbus Xoggz, Indiana Blast, and Columbus Invaders.
