= Drew Shepherd =

American soccer player (born 1994)

Personal information
- Full name: Andrew Shepherd
- Date of birth: December 25, 1994 (age 31)
- Place of birth: Denver, Colorado, United States
- Height: 1.91 m (6 ft 3 in)
- Position: Goalkeeper

College career
| Years | Team | Apps | (Gls) |
| 2013–2017 | Western Michigan Broncos | 60 | (0) |

Senior career*
| Years | Team | Apps | (Gls) |
| 2015–2017 | Michigan Bucks | 31 | (0) |
| 2018 | Toronto FC III | 1 | (0) |
| 2018 | Toronto FC II | 1 | (0) |
- * Club domestic league appearances and goals as of May 31, 2018

Drew Shepherd (born December 25, 1994) is an American professional soccer player.

== Career ==
=== College & Youth ===
Shepherd played college soccer at Western Michigan University between 2014 and 2017, including spending a year as a redshirt in 2013. While with the Broncos, Shepherd made 60 appearances and contributed 29 shutouts.

During his time in college, Shepherd also spent time with Premier Development League side Michigan Bucks.

=== Professional ===
Shepherd was drafted in the second round, 46th overall, in the 2018 MLS SuperDraft by Toronto FC on January 19, 2018. Shepherd signed with Toronto FC II, the club's USL affiliate. He made his debut on May 30, 2018, starting against Ottawa Fury FC, but was substituted in the 16th minute after injuring himself when conceding a penalty. He also appeared in a match for Toronto FC III in League1 Ontario.
