= Western Michigan Broncos men's soccer =

American college soccer team

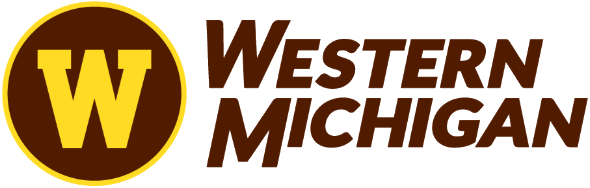
- Founded: 1971; 55 years ago
- University: Western Michigan University
- Head coach: Chad Wiseman (11th season)
- Conference: MVC
- Location: Kalamazoo, Michigan, US
- Stadium: WMU Soccer Complex (capacity: 1,000)
- Nickname: Broncos
- Colors: Brown and gold
Home	Away

NCAA tournament Round of 16
- 2017, 2022, 2023

NCAA tournament Round of 32
- 2017, 2022, 2023, 2024, 2025

NCAA tournament appearances
- 2003, 2017, 2022, 2023, 2024, 2025

Conference tournament championships
- 2003, 2022, 2023, 2025

Conference regular season championships
- 2017, 2023

The Western Michigan Broncos men's soccer team represents Western Michigan University in NCAA Division I men's college soccer. The Broncos compete as a member of the Missouri Valley Conference (MVC) as of 2025.

The team currently plays its home games at the WMU Soccer Complex on the campus. The team has qualified for NCAA Tournament most recently in 2025 after winning the MVC tournament title.

== History ==
=== Joining the Missouri Valley Conference ===
Following the Mid-American Conference's decision to suspend sponsorship of men's soccer following the 2022 season, the Western Michigan Broncos joined the Missouri Valley Conference as affiliate members. Fellow MAC members Bowling Green and Northern Illinois also joined the Broncos in MVC men's soccer. Following their successful 2022 season, the WMU Broncos became the last men's soccer team to win the MAC championship.

== NCAA tournament results ==
Season	Competition	Round	Seed	Rival	Result	Notes
2003	NCAA Tournament	First round (48 teams)	–	at Milwaukee	L 4–1	
2017	NCAA Tournament	Second round (32 teams)	No. 10	vs. Albany	W 2–0	
2017	NCAA Tournament	Third round (16 teams)	No. 10	at No. 7 Michigan State	L 2–1	
2022	NCAA Tournament	First round (48 teams)	–	at Louisville	W 2–1 (a.e.t.)	
2022	NCAA Tournament	Second round (32 teams)	–	at No. 9 Lipscomb	W 1–0	
2022	NCAA Tournament	Third round (16 teams)	–	at Portland	L 1–0	
2023	NCAA Tournament	First round (48 teams)	–	vs. Green Bay	W 3–0	
2023	NCAA Tournament	Second round (32 teams)	–	at No. 15 Duke	W 2–1 (a.e.t.)	
2023	NCAA Tournament	Third round (16 teams)	–	at No. 2 Notre Dame	L 0–0 (p 4–2)	
2024	NCAA Tournament	First Round (48 teams)	-	SIU Edwardsville	W 5–1	
2024	NCAA Tournament	Second Round (32 teams)	-	at No. 1 Ohio State	L 1–2	
2025	NCAA Tournament	First Round (48 teams)	-	at Clemson	W 1–0	
2025	NCAA Tournament	Second Round (32 teams)	-	at No. 16 Furman	L 0–1	

== Year-by-year results ==
Year	Coach	Overall	Conference	Standing	Bowl/playoffs	Rank^{#}
Pete Esdale (1971)
1971	Pete Esdale	5–7–0				
Pete Esdale:		5–7–0				
Pete Glon (1972–1977)
1972	Pete Glon	2–10–1				
1973	Pete Glon	4–4–5				
1974	Pete Glon	7–5–1				
1975	Pete Glon	5–5–2				
1976	Pete Glon	5–5–2				
1977	Pete Glon	6–6–1				
Pete Glon:		29–35–12				
Scott Ferris (1978–1982)
1978	Scott Ferris	7–2–3				
1979	Scott Ferris	4–9–2				
1980	Scott Ferris	6–11–2				
1981	Scott Ferris	6–9–3				
1982	Scott Ferris	10–8–2				
Scott Ferris:		33–39–12				
Blake Glass (1983–1997)
1983	Blake Glass	8–10–0				
1984	Blake Glass	9–7–1				
1985	Blake Glass	9–8–0				
1986	Blake Glass	8–9–1				
1987	Blake Glass	10–8–1				
1988	Blake Glass	12–5–2				
1989	Blake Glass	11–6–1				
1990	Blake Glass	8–9–2				
1991	Blake Glass	10–8–0				
1992	Blake Glass	6–7–2				
1993	Blake Glass	10–8–0	2–3–0	4th		
1994	Blake Glass	9–10–1	2–3–0	4th		
1995	Blake Glass	6–12–1	1–4–0	5th		
1996	Blake Glass	4–11–4	0–4–1	6th		
1997	Blake Glass	5–8–4	1–5–1	7th		
Blake Glass:		125–126–20	6–19–2			
Chris Karwoski (1998–2008)
1998	Chris Karwoski	4–15–2	1–7–0	t-8th		
1999	Chris Karwoski	2–15–3	0–5–2	8th		
2000	Chris Karwoski	6–13–1	1–5–0	t-6th		
2001	Chris Karwoski	5–13–1	1–4–1	5th		
2002	Chris Karwoski	3–14–2	1–6–0	7th		
2003	Chris Karwoski	12–7–2	3–2–1	3rd		
2004	Chris Karwoski	9–7–4	3–2–1	4th		
2005	Chris Karwoski	9–9–2	2–2–1	t-3rd		
2006	Chris Karwoski	6–12–1	3–2–0	3rd		
2007	Chris Karwoski	7–10–2	0–4–1	6th		
2008	Chris Karwoski	3–15–1	2–4–0	5th		
Chris Karwoski:		66–130–21	17–43–7			
Stu Riddle (2009–2012)
2009	Stu Riddle	6–10–1	3–2–1	3rd		
2010	Stu Riddle	10–8–2	4–2–0	2nd		
2011	Stu Riddle	6–12–3	2–2–2	4th		
2012	Stu Riddle	11–6–2	3–3–1	t-4th		
Stu Riddle:		33–36–8	12–9–4			
Chad Wiseman (2013–present)
2013	Chad Wiseman	9–9–1	4–1–1	2nd		
2014	Chad Wiseman	8–7–4	2–2–1	4th		
2015	Chad Wiseman	11–4–4	3–1–1	2nd		
2016	Chad Wiseman	9–6–4	1–1–3	4th		
2017	Chad Wiseman	17–4–1	5–0–0	1st		9
2018	Chad Wiseman	11–6–3	1–1–2	3rd		
2019	Chad Wiseman	11–5–2	2–1–2	2nd		25
2020	Chad Wiseman	7–3–1	5–3–1	2nd		
2021	Chad Wiseman	7–6–5	2–3–1	5th		
2022	Chad Wiseman	16–3–2	5–1–2	2nd		
2023	Chad Wiseman	17–1–4	7–0–1	1st		12th
2024	Chad Wiseman	11–2–6	3–1–4	4th		20th
2025	Chad Wiseman	8–10–4	2–2–3	6th		
Chad Wiseman:		142–67–41	42–17–22			
Total:		375–423–104				
National championship Conference title Conference division title or championship game berth
^{#}Rankings from final Coaches Poll.

== Notable alumni ==
- Brandon Bye - Player for the New England Revolution
- Sean Lewis - Player for Indy Eleven
- Jonathan Robinson - Player for Auckland City in the OFC Professional League
- Jake Rufe - Player for Birmingham Legion
- Drew Shepherd - Former player for Toronto FC II
- Charlie Sharp - Player for Toronto FC I/II
