= WMU Soccer Complex =

Soccer stadium in Kalamazoo, Michigan

Coordinates: 42.25758°N 85.64163°W

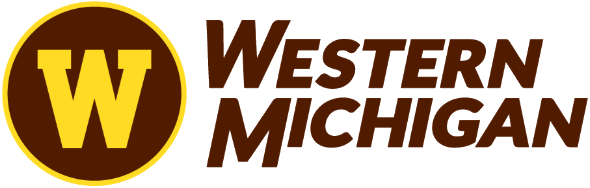
- Interactive map of WMU Soccer Complex
- Former names: Lee Baker Field
- Address: Kalamazoo, MI
- Owner: Western Michigan University
- Operator: WMU Athletics
- Type: Soccer-specific stadium
- Current use: Soccer

Construction
- Opened: 2005; 21 years ago

Tenants
- Western Michigan Broncos (NCAA) teams: men's and women's soccer

Website
- wmubroncos.com//soccer-complex

The WMU Soccer Complex is a soccer-specific stadium located in Kalamazoo, Michigan on the campus of Western Michigan University. Originally known as Lee Baker Field, the complex is adjacent to WMU's Business, Technology & Research Park and the Engineering College campus.

The stadium serves as home to both the Western Michigan Broncos men's and women's soccer teams. The stands seat about 500, and there is standing room along the fencelines, particularly on the north and west sides.

== Overview ==
The stadium opened in 2005. The first upgrades were in 2012, when the field was fenced and team shelters were added. A paved parking lot, a formal entry and walkways, and a press box were added in 2013. New bleacher seating was installed in 2015,

The grass turf of the playing field received a major overhaul of during the summer of 2017 with removal of the top layer of soil by fraze mowing, laser-guided grading, and a new drainage system. At the same time, a new scoreboard was installed along with new fencing, a new flagpole, and new nets behind the goals.

In addition to the stadium, the complex includes a full-sized practice field, electronic scoreboard and sound system, covered bench shelters, and a concession stand with a storage shed.
