= 2017 NCAA Division I men's soccer championship game =

NCAA Division I men's soccer championship game
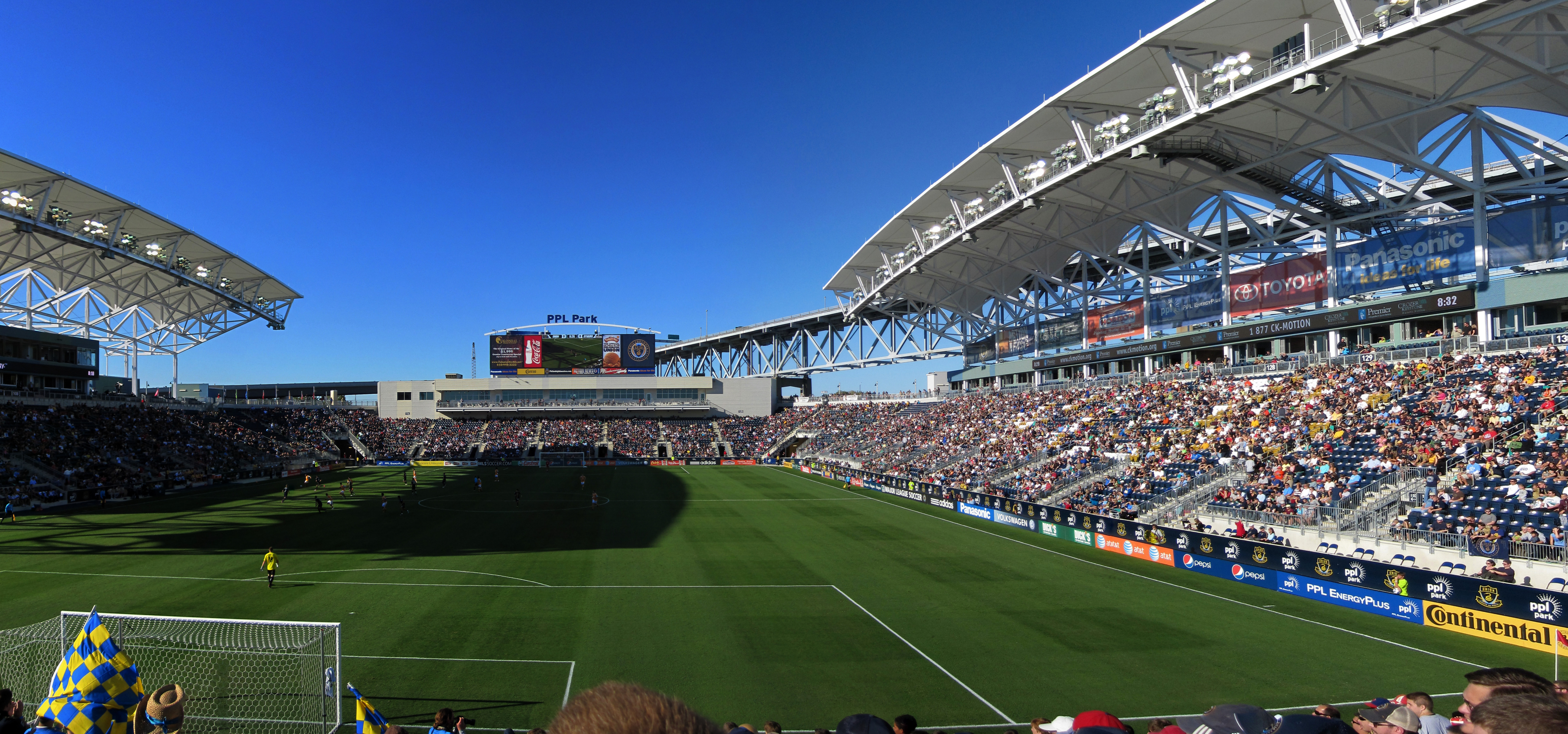
- Talen Energy Stadium, venue
- Event: 2017 NCAA Division I Men's Soccer Championship
Indiana	Stanford
Big Ten	Pac-12
0	1
- After extra time
- Date: December 10, 2017
- Venue: Talen Energy Stadium, Chester, Pennsylvania
- Referee: Chico Grajeda
- Attendance: 5,764
- Weather: Partly cloudy and 37 °F (3 °C)

The 2017 NCAA Division I men's soccer championship game was the final game of the 2017 NCAA Division I Men's Soccer Championship, determining the national champion for the 2017 NCAA Division I men's soccer season. The match was played on December 10, 2017, at Talen Energy Stadium in Chester, Pennsylvania, a soccer-specific stadium that is home to the Major League Soccer club Philadelphia Union. The match was contested between Stanford of the Pac-12 Conference and Indiana of the Big Ten Conference.

After 90 scoreless minutes, the match was decided in the second period extra time on a golden goal from Stanford's Sam Werner. The win gave Stanford their third consecutive NCAA Division I Men's Soccer title, making them the second ever program to threepeat in the tournament, and the first program to do so since Bruce Arena's Virginia teams did so in 1994. Additionally, the victory gave Stanford an unprecedented 115th NCAA overall team title, moving ahead of UCLA. With the women's team also winning the Women's College Cup the week before, the title makes Stanford the first Division I school to win national titles in both men's and women's soccer in the same season.

The match was televised on live on ESPN2.

== Road to the final ==
The NCAA Division I Men's Soccer Tournament, sometimes known as the College Cup, is an American intercollegiate soccer tournament conducted by the National Collegiate Athletic Association (NCAA), and determines the Division I men's national champion. The tournament has been formally held since 1959, when it was an eight-team tournament. Since then, the tournament has expanded to 48 teams, in which every Division I conference tournament champion is allocated a berth. It was Indiana's first appearance since 2012, which they won. Stanford entered the final as the two-defending champion, winning their first ever national title in their third NCAA final appearance. It was the Cardinal's fifth NCAA championship appearance, finishing as runners-up in 1998 and 2002.

=== Indiana ===
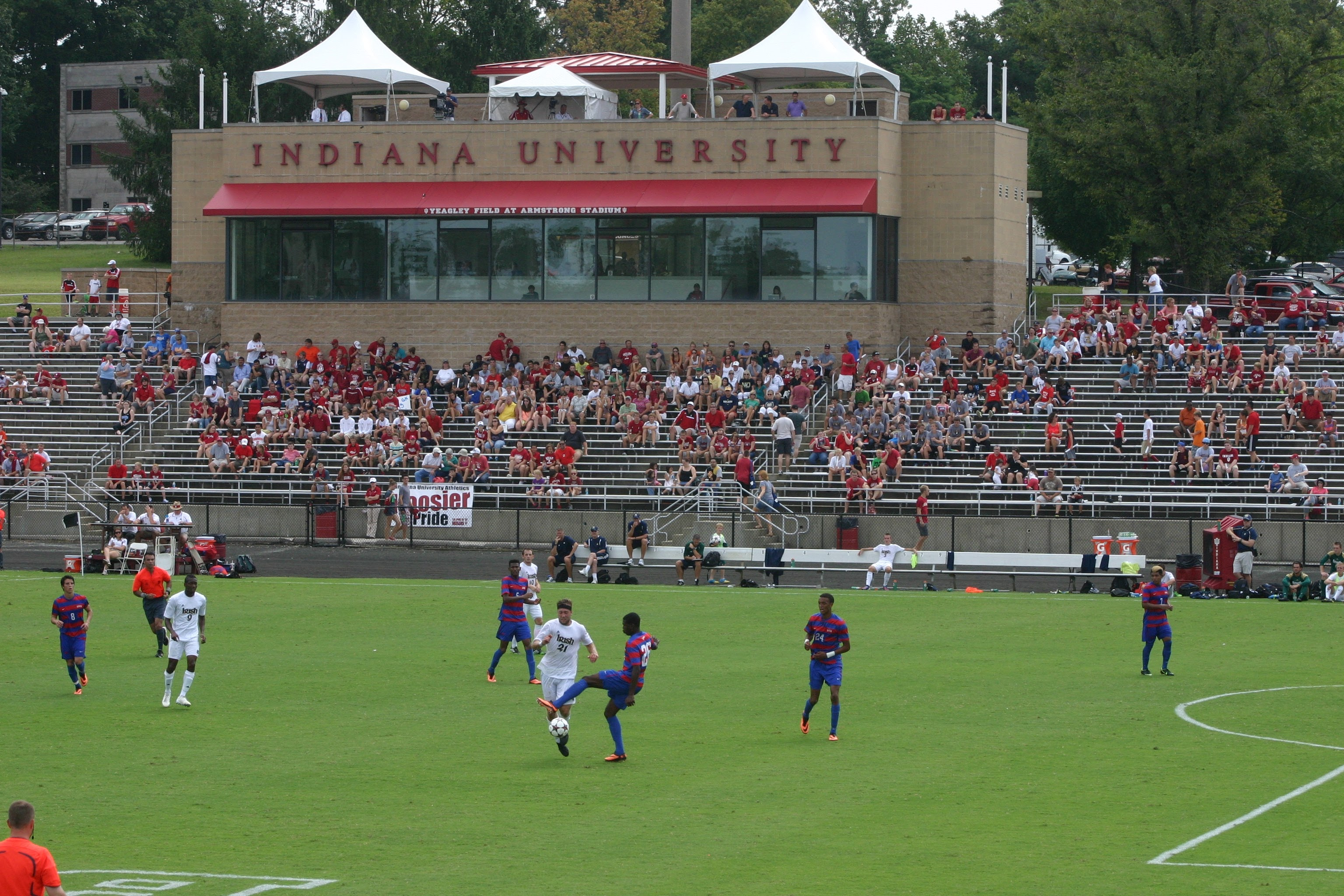
Bill Armstrong Stadium hosted the Hoosiers through the semifinals of the NCAA Tournament

The Hoosiers entered the 2017 season with an NCAA-record 42 consecutive seasons qualifying for the NCAA Division I Men's Soccer Championship, qualifying for every NCAA Tournament since 1976. The Hoosiers were coming off an unexpectedly early exit from the NCAA Tournament, where they earned an at-large berth and reached the Round of 16, before losing to Virginia Tech on penalty kicks. During the 2016 Big Ten Conference men's soccer season, the Hoosiers were tied for second in the regular season with Wisconsin. In the 2016 Big Ten Conference Men's Soccer Tournament, the Hoosiers reached the semifinals before losing, again on penalties, to Wisconsin.

The Hoosiers finished the regular season with an undefeated record, being the only program in the nation to achieve such an accomplishment. During the regular season, the Hoosiers finished 13–0–4 and 5–0–3 in conference play. They finished second in the Big Ten behind Michigan, and were seeded second in the 2017 Big Ten Conference Men's Soccer Tournament. There, the Hoosiers defeated Penn State and Ohio without giving up any goals. In the championship game, the Hoosiers faced Wisconsin, the same program that had eliminated them from the previous year's Big Ten Tournament. After a scoreless draw, the Badgers got the better of the Hoosiers in a penalty shoot-out, giving the Badgers the Big Ten title. Despite failing to win the Big Ten title, Indiana earned an at-large berth into the NCAA Tournament, where they were given the number two-overall seed. This afforded the Hoosiers a first-round bye, where they hosted the winner of the Old Dominion (2017 Conference USA Men's Soccer Tournament champions) vs. NC State (ACC 9th-place finishers) match in the second round. Old Dominion won the match 2–0, meaning the Hoosiers hosted the Monarchs in Bloomington on November 19, in the second round. Goals from Lillard, Toye and Panchot were enough for Indiana, as they cruised to a 3–0 win over Old Dominion.

In the third round, or "sweet sixteen" of the tournament, Indiana hosted the 20th-ranked, New Hampshire (2017 America East Men's Soccer Tournament semifinalists). Thomas opened the scoring for the Hoosiers in the 10th minute, while Moore scored the game-winning goal in the 65th minute, giving Indiana a 2–0 lead over New Hampshire. The Wildcats' Jacob Gould would notch one back in the 76th minute, creating a nervy final quarter hour for the Hoosiers. Despite this, Indiana would hold on to win the match, and advance to their 25th NCAA quarterfinal ("elite eight") and their first since their national championship run in 2012. In the quarterfinals, Indiana was pitted against their conference foes, the seventh-seed Michigan State. The match, played at Bill Armstrong Stadium in Bloomington was sold out, with a capacity crowd of 5,450. In the match, the Spartans would score a stunning 2nd-minute goal to put the Hoosiers in an early hole. Michigan State left winger Ken Krolicki served a cross to Ryan Sierakowski, who headed it in the bottom left corner. It was Ryan Sierakowski's ninth goal of the season. The Spartans would hold on to the lead through the first half and through a third of the second half of play. In the 60th minute, Indiana's Swartz headed an inswinging corner kick to tie the match, 1–1. The score would remain gridlocked through the remainder of regulation and the two overtime periods. In penalty kicks, Indiana prevailed over Michigan State 3–2, giving the Hoosiers their 19th College Cup appearance.

In the national semifinals, Indiana took on a familiar college soccer powerhouse, North Carolina. The cagey match featured a lone goal from Gutman, who scored off a loose ball in the penalty box off a deflected corner kick. This lone 50th-minute goal was enough to send Indiana to its 15th NCAA Division I men's soccer championship game.

=== Stanford ===
The Cardinal began the season as the two-time defending NCAA Champions, and the three-time defending Pac-12 Champions. The program had nine of its starters from 2016 return for 2017. One of the program's major losses entering 2017 was senior defender, Brian Nana-Sinkham, who graduated and signed a pro contract with United Soccer League outfit Seattle Sounders FC 2, the reserve team of Major League Soccer's Seattle Sounders FC. Notable returnees included Drew Skundrich, Corey Baird and Foster Langsdorf, who had been central pieces of Stanford's team since their 2015 championship. During the regular season into the NCAA Tournament, the three led the team in points and in goals. Langsdorf specifically led the team with 34 points on the season, from 14 goals and 6 assists. Baird led the team with 7 assists.

During the 2016-17 offseason, it was speculated that midfielder Baird would forgo his senior season and sign a homegrown contract with MLS's Real Salt Lake for playing in their academy before college. Baird committed during the spring that he would return for a senior season at Stanford.

During preseason, it was predicted that the Cardinal would again win the Pac-12 title. The Cardinal were ranked first in numerous preseason national rankings including United Soccer Coaches, TopDrawerSoccer.com, CollegeSoccerNews.com, Hero Sports and Soccer America.

== Pre-match ==
=== Venue selection ===
The National Collegiate Athletic Association determined the host of the final in 2015. Since the foundation of the NCAA Tournament, the venue for the College Cup semifinals and national championship have been played at a predetermined neutral site. It was the first time since 2013 that the state of Pennsylvania hosted the NCAA Men's College Cup and the third time ever that the state hosted the College Cup.

Tickets went on pre-sale for Philadelphia Union season ticket holders on August 24, 2017.

=== Analysis ===
Ahead of the match, CollegeSoccerNews.com said the match should "be dandy" given the explosive offense Stanford brings and Indiana's strong defense. The staff article published by CSN did not favoritism towards either Stanford or Indiana, but instead took pieces of what could give the Cardinal or Hoosiers a national championship. The prediction included that Stanford's specialty in set pieces and athleticism might not favor the Hoosiers, while the Cardinal also have had experience of playing in the two previous title games. Indiana was seen as a potential victor due to never losing a single match in regulation at all during the season. Predictions, however, that slightly favored Stanford, said that Indiana's Mason Toye, the true freshman with 10 goals on the season, would need to have an impact on the match in order for the Hoosiers to see it through. Some critics and analysts favored Indiana because of their experienced back line that featured center backs Grant Lillard and Andrew Gutman.

Predictions that favored Stanford stated that Stanford striker Foster Langsdorf, who had been with the team for the 2015 and 2016 finals, would need to have a big match in order to secure a victory for Stanford.

== Match ==
=== Details ===
December 10, 2017
12:00 PM EST

Indiana	0–1 (a.e.t.)	Stanford
	Report	Werner 103'

Talen Energy Stadium, Chester
Attendance: 5,764
Referee: Chico Grajeda

Indiana	Stanford

GK	1	(United States) Trey Muse
RB	19	(United States) Rece Buckmaster
CB	15	(United States) Andrew Gutman
CB	5	(United States) Grant Lillard
LB	20	(United States) Timmy Mehl
RW	8	(United States) Jared Gilbey
DM	14	(United States) Griffin Dorsey
CM	13	(United States) Francesco Moore
CM	12	(United States) Austin Panchot
LW	7	(United States) Trevor Swartz
ST	8	(United States) Mason Toye
Substitutes:
FW	9	(Trinidad and Tobago) Rashad Hyacenth
MF	10	(United States) Justin Rennicks
Manager:
(United States) Todd Yeagley

GK	1	(Belgium) Nico Corti
RB	3	(United States) Tanner Beason
CB	4	(United States) Tomas Hilliard-Arce
CB	6	(Egypt) Adam Mosharrafa
LB	22	(United States) Logan Panchot
CM	8	(United States) Jared Gilbey
CM	7	(United States) Bryce Marion
CM	23	(United States) Sam Werner
AM	12	(United States) Drew Skundrich
ST	2	(United States) Foster Langsdorf
ST	10	(United States) Corey Baird
Substitutes:
MF	11	(United States) Amir Bashti
DF	5	(United States) Carson Vom Steeg
MF	29	(United States) Derek Waldeck
MF	17	(United States) Charlie Wehan
GK	31	(Spain) Eduardo Fabre
Manager:
(England) Jeremy Gunn

College Cup MVP
Andrew Epstein (Stanford)

Assistant referees:
Danny Thornberry (United States)
Tom Felice (United States)
Fourth official:
Chris Penso (United States)

Match rules:

- 90 minutes.
- 20 minutes of extra time if necessary.
- Penalty shoot-out if scores still level.
- Unlimited substitutes, may not return if subbed out in the first half; may return unlimited times in the second half.
