= 2017 Big Ten Conference men's soccer season =

- League: NCAA Division I
- Sport: Soccer
- Duration: August 25, 2017 – November 5, 2017
- Teams: 9

2018 MLS SuperDraft
- Top draft pick: Francis Atuahene, Michigan
- Picked by: FC Dallas, 4th overall

Regular Season
- Season champions: Michigan
- Runners-up: Indiana
- Season MVP: FW: Chris Mueller, Wisconsin; MF: Eryk Williamson, Maryland; DF: Grant Lillard, Indiana; GK: Jimmy Hague, Michigan State
- Top scorer: Tom Barlow (10)

Tournament
- Champions: Wisconsin
- Runners-up: Indiana
- Finals MVP: Tom Barlow

Big Ten Conference men's soccer seasons
- ← 2016 2018 →

2017 Big Ten Conference men's soccer standings
	Conf.					Overall
Team	W		L		T	W		L		T
No. 11 Michigan +	6	–	1	–	1	12	–	6	–	2
No. 2 Indiana +	5	–	0	–	3	18	–	1	–	6
No. 6 Michigan State +	5	–	0	–	3	13	–	3	–	4
Maryland +	5	–	1	–	2	10	–	5	–	4
No. 10 Wisconsin ‡	4	–	3	–	1	12	–	5	–	5
Ohio State	3	–	5	–	0	8	–	10	–	1
Penn State	2	–	6	–	0	5	–	10	–	2
Northwestern	1	–	7	–	0	7	–	12	–	0
Rutgers	0	–	8	–	0	4	–	13	–	1
‡ – 2017 Big Ten Tournament champion + – Invited to the 2017 NCAA Division I Men's Soccer Championship; As of December 13, 2017; Rankings from United Soccer Coaches

The 2017 Big Ten Conference men's soccer season was the 27th season of men's varsity soccer in the conference. The season began on August 25, 2017 and concluded on November 5, 2017. The season culminated with the 2017 Big Ten Conference Men's Soccer Tournament to determine the conference's automatic berth into the 2017 NCAA Division I Men's Soccer Tournament.

The Maryland Terrapins entered the 2017 season as both the Big Ten regular season and tournament defending champions. Maryland was unable to defend either title, heavily due to a late season slump in form, that culminated with a double overtime loss to Michigan. Wisconsin won their first Big Ten Tournament since 1995, defeating Indiana in the championship in penalties. The Michigan Wolverines posted a 6–1–1 Big Ten record, giving the Wolverines their first ever Big Ten regular season title, besting Indiana on points.

The Big Ten sent five teams to the NCAA Tournament, three being seeded (Indiana, Michigan and Michigan State), and three unseeded (Maryland and Wisconsin). Indiana advanced the furthest of all the Big Ten teams, reaching the 2017 NCAA Division I Men's Soccer Championship Game, before losing in overtime to Stanford.

== Background ==
=== Head coaches ===
Team	Head coach	Previous job	Years at school	Overall record	Record at school	Big Ten record	NCAA Tournaments	NCAA College Cups	NCAA Titles
Indiana	Todd Yeagley	Wisconsin	8	91–49–29 (.624)	84–40–27 (.646)	22–14–12 (.583)	7	1	1
Maryland	Sasho Cirovski	Hartford	25	387–160–52 (.689)	361–148–46 (.692)	15–4–5 (.729)	23	8	2
Michigan	Chaka Daley	Providence	6	127–138–42 (.482)	37–43–15 (.468)	13–17–6 (.444)	1	0	0
Michigan State	Damon Rensing	Michigan State (assistant)	9	90–58–22 (.594)	90–58–22 (.594)	22–24–8 (.481)	6	0	0
Northwestern	Tim Lenahan	Lafayette	17	282–188–67 (.588)	156–119–46 (.558)	35–48–17 (.435)	9	0	0
Ohio State	John Bluem	Fresno State	21	284–181–69 (.596)	198–151–57 (.558)	60–49–13 (.545)	9	1	0
Penn State	Bob Warming	Creighton	8	448–222–78 (.651)	65–42–14 (.595)	17–18–6 (.488)	2	0	0
Rutgers	Dan Donigan	Saint Louis	8	165–111–36 (.587)	47–69–14 (.415)	5–16–3 (.271)	2	0	0
Wisconsin	John Trask	UIC	8	107–85–48 (.546)	53–61–22 (.471)	16–23–9 (.427)	1	0	0

== Preseason ==
=== Recruiting ===
National Rankings
Team	CSN	TDS	Total Signees
Indiana	4	4	
Maryland	12	10	
Michigan	9	11	
Michigan State	NR	NR	
Northwestern	NR	NR	
Ohio State	7	13	
Penn State	NR	NR	
Rutgers	NR	35	
Wisconsin	NR	NR	

=== Preseason poll ===
The preseason poll was released on August 16.

	Team ranking
1.	Maryland
2.	Indiana
3.	Wisconsin
4.	Michigan State
5.	Michigan
6.	Penn State
7.	Ohio State
8.	Northwestern
9.	Rutgers

== Regular season ==
=== Results ===
Team/Opponent	IND	UMD	MCH	MSU	NWU	OSU	PSU	RUT	WIS
Indiana Hoosiers		0–0	1–1	1–1	2–0	2–0	1–0	5–0	2–1
Maryland Terrapins	0–0		1–2	0–0	3–0	1–0	2–0	3–0	5–4
Michigan Wolverines	1–1	2–1		0–1	3–1	2–0	2–1	3–1	2–1
Michigan State Spartans	1–1	0–0	1–0		2–0	5–1	1–0	2–1	1–1
Northwestern Wildcats	0–2	0–3	1–3	0–2		0–1	1–2,	3–0, 3–2	1–3
Ohio State Buckeyes	0–2	0–1	0–2	1–5	1–0		3–0	1–0	0–2
Penn State Nittany Lions	0–1	0–2	1–2	0–1	2–1	0–3		6–2	0–1
Rutgers Scarlet Knights	0–5	0–3	1–3	1–2	0–3, 2–3	0–1	2–6		2–3
Wisconsin Badgers	1–2	4–5	1–2	1–1	3–1	2–0	1–0	3–2	

=== Rankings ===
==== United Soccer Coaches National ====
Legend
Increase in ranking
Decrease in ranking
Not ranked previous week

		Pre	Wk 1	Wk 2	Wk 3	Wk 4	Wk 5	Wk 6	Wk 7	Wk 8	Wk 9	Wk 10	Wk 11	Wk 12	Final
Indiana	C	7	7	4	1	2	1	1	1	1	2	2	2	2	2
Maryland	C	6	6	5	3	3	3	3	3	3	9	24	RV	RV	
Michigan	C			RV	18	22	20	RV	24	23	19	12	10	16	11
Michigan State	C	22	13	13	6	6	4	6	6	9	7	8	14	15	6
Northwestern	C														
Ohio State	C				RV	25	16	RV	RV	RV					
Penn State	C														
Rutgers	C														
Wisconsin	C		RV										RV	20	10

==== United Soccer Coaches Midwest Regional ====
Legend
Increase in ranking
Decrease in ranking
Not ranked previous week

		Wk 1	Wk 2	Wk 3	Wk 4	Wk 5	Wk 6	Wk 7	Wk 8	Wk 9	Wk 10	Wk 11	Wk 12
Indiana	C	1	1	1	1	1	1	1	1	1	1	1	1
Maryland	C	2	2	2	2	2	2	2	2	3	6	9	9
Michigan	C	6	5	4	6	6	6	5	4	4	2	2	3
Michigan State	C	3	4	3	3	3	3	3	3	2	3	3	4
Northwestern	C												
Ohio State	C			7	5	5	5	7	8				
Penn State	C												
Rutgers	C												
Wisconsin	C		10		10	10	8	6	5	8	7	5	2

== Postseason ==
=== Big Ten Tournament ===
Semifinals
1	Michigan	0
5	Wisconsin	4
6	Ohio State	0
2	Indiana	4

Final
5	Wisconsin (pen.)	0 (4)
2	Indiana	0 (2)

=== NCAA Tournament ===
Seed	Region	School	1st Round	2nd Round	3rd Round	Quarterfinals	Semifinals	Championship
2	4	Indiana	BYE	W 3–0 vs. Old Dominion – (Bloomington)	W 2–1 vs. New Hampshire – (Bloomington)	T, 1–1 ^{W, 3–2 pen.} vs. Michigan State – (Bloomington)	W 1–0 vs. North Carolina – (Chester)	L 0–1 ^{OT} vs. Stanford – (Chester)
7	4	Michigan State	BYE	W 3–0 vs. Virginia Tech – (East Lansing)	W 3–2 vs. Western Michigan – (East Lansing)	T, 1–1 ^{L, 2–3 pen.} vs. Indiana – (Bloomington)		
13	2	Michigan	BYE	L 2–3 vs. Colgate – (Ann Arbor)				
—N/a	2	Wisconsin	W 4–1 vs. UIC – (Madison)	W 1–0 vs. Notre Dame – (Notre Dame)	L 2–3^{OT} vs. Akron – (Akron)			
—N/a	4	Maryland	T, 0–0 ^{L, 4–5 pen.} vs. Albany – (College Park)					

== Awards ==
2017 Big Ten Men's Soccer Individual Awards
Award	Recipient(s)
Offensive Player of the Year	Chris Mueller, Wisconsin
Defensive Player of the Year	Grant Lillard, Indiana
Midfielder of the Year	Eryk Williamson, Maryland
Goalkeeper of the Year	Jimmy Hague, Michigan State
Coach of the Year	Chaka Daley, Michigan
Freshman of the Year	Mason Toye, Indiana

2017 Big Ten Men's Soccer All-Conference Teams
First Team Honorees	Second Team Honorees	All-Freshman Team Honorees	Sportsmanship Award Honorees
Forwards: Chris Mueller, Sr., Wisconsin; Mason Toye, Fr., Indiana; Jack Hallahan, So., Michigan Midfield: Eryk Williamson, Jr., Maryland; Ken Krolicki, Sr., Michigan State; Jake Rozhansky, Sr., Maryland; Francesco Moore, Jr., Indiana Defense: Grant Lillard, Sr., Indiana; Jimmy Fiscus, Sr., Michigan State; Andrew Gutman Jr., Indiana Goalkeeper: Jimmy Hague, Jr., Michigan State	Forwards: Griffin Dorsey, Fr., Indiana; Francis Atuahene, Jr., Michigan; DeJuan Jones, Jr., Michigan State; Ryan Sierakowski, Jr., Michigan State Midfield: Abdi Mohamed, Jr., Ohio State; Charles Mertz, Jr., Michigan; Mark Segbers, Sr., Wisconsin Defense: Donovan Pines, So., Maryland; Timmy Mehl, Jr., Indiana; Marcello Borges, Jr., Michigan Goalkeeper: Trey Muse, Fr., Indiana	Mohammed Zakyi, Michigan; Marc Ybarra, Michigan; Umar Farouk Osman, Michigan; Garrett Opperman, Northwestern; Ethan Beckford, Penn State; Mason Toye, Indiana; Griffin Dorsey, Indiana; Trey Muse, Indiana; Tommy Katsyiannis, Northwestern; Vincent Borden, Rutgers; Bryce Washington, Rutgers	Jack Griffith, Sr., Indiana; Andrew Samuels, Jr., Maryland; Tristan Jacob, Sr., Michigan; Brad Centala, Sr., Michigan State; Francisco Tomasino, Sr., Northwestern; Hunter Robertson, Sr., Ohio State; Dani Marks, Jr., Penn State; Erik Sa, Sr., Rutgers; Isaac Schenkler, Jr., Wisconsin

== MLS SuperDraft ==
=== Total picks by school ===
Team	Round 1	Round 2	Round 3	Round 4	Total
Indiana	1	0	0	–	1
Maryland	0	2	0	–	2
Michigan	1	0	0	–	1
Michigan State	0	0	1	–	1
Northwestern	0	0	0	–	0
Ohio State	0	0	0	–	0
Penn State	0	0	0	–	0
Rutgers	0	0	0	–	0
Wisconsin	2	1	1	–	4

=== List of selections ===
Round	Pick #	MLS team	Player	Position	College	Other
1	4	FC Dallas	Francis Atuahene	FW	Michigan	Generation adidas
1	6	Orlando City	Chris Mueller	FW	Wisconsin	
1	7	Minnesota United	Mason Toye	FW	Indiana	
1	9	New England Revolution	Mark Segbers	DF	Wisconsin	
2	37	Atlanta United	Gordon Wild	FW	Maryland	Generation adidas
2	39	New York Red Bulls	Tommy Barlow	FW	Wisconsin	
2	44	Columbus Crew	Jake Rozhansky	Midfielder	Maryland	
3	53	Montreal Impact	Ken Krolicki	Midfielder	Michigan State	
3	54	Philadelphia Union	Mike Catalano	Midfielder	Wisconsin	

=== Homegrown contracts ===
Original MLS team	Player	Position	College	Notes	Ref.
Chicago Fire	Grant Lillard	Defender	Indiana	2017 Big Ten Defender of the Year	

== See also ==
- Big Ten Conference
- 2017 Big Ten Conference Men's Soccer Tournament
- 2017 NCAA Division I men's soccer season
- 2017 in American soccer
