= 2017 NCAA Division I men's soccer tournament =

2017 NCAA men's soccer tournament
College Cup

Tournament details
- Country: United States
- Dates: November 16 – December 10
- Teams: 48

Final positions
- Champions: Stanford
- Runners-up: Indiana

Tournament statistics
- Matches played: 47
- Goals scored: 106 (2.26 per match)
- All statistics correct as of November 26, 2017.

The 2017 NCAA Division I men's soccer tournament (also known as the 2017 College Cup) was the 59th annual single-elimination tournament to determine the national champion of NCAA Division I men's collegiate soccer. The first, second, third, and quarterfinal rounds were held at college campus sites across the United States during November and December 2017, with host sites determined by seeding and record. The four-team College Cup finals were played at Talen Energy Stadium in Chester, Pennsylvania on December 8 and 10.

The Stanford Cardinal defended their 2016 title by defeating Indiana in golden goal overtime, 1–0, to claim the 2017 championship.

== Qualification ==
As in previous editions of the NCAA Division I Tournament, the tournament featured 48 participants out of a possible field of 203 teams. Of the 48 berths, 24 were allocated to the 21 conference tournament champions and to the regular season winners of the Ivy League, Pac-12 Conference, and West Coast Conference, which did not have tournaments. The remaining 24 berths were determined through an at-large process based upon the Ratings Percentage Index (RPI) of teams that did not automatically qualify.

The NCAA Selection Committee also named the top sixteen seeds for the tournament, with those teams receiving an automatic bye into the second round of the tournament. The remaining 32 teams played in a single-elimination match in the first round of the tournament for the right to play a seeded team in the second round.

Of the 24 schools that had previously won the championship, 13 qualified for the 2017 tournament.

=== Qualified teams ===
Team	Qualified as	Qualified on	Qualification type	Previous appearances in tournament	Previous best performance
Air Force	No. 27 RPI	November 13	At-large	11 (1964, 1965, 1968, 1969, 1972, 1977, 1985, 1992, 1993, 1997, 2012)	Quarterfinals (1968, 1993)
Albany	America East champions	November 12	Automatic	1 (2016)	Round of 16 (2016)
Akron	MAC champions	November 12	Automatic	27 (1966, 1967, 1968, 1970, 1971, 1975, 1976, 1983, 1984, 1985, 1986, 1998, 2001, 2002, 2003, 2004, 2005, 2007, 2008, 2009, 2010, 2011, 2012, 2013, 2014. 2015, 2016)	Champions (2010)
Butler	No. 14 RPI	November 13	At-large	7 (1995, 1997, 1998, 2001, 2009, 2010, 2016)	Round of 16 (1995, 1998)
California	No. 33 RPI	November 13	At-large	18 (1960, 1977, 1981, 1983, 1985, 1986, 1996, 2001, 2002, 2003, 2004, 2005, 2006, 2007, 2008, 2010, 2013, 2014)	Quarterfinals (2005)
Cal State Fullerton	Big West champions	November 11	Automatic	9 (1975, 1986, 1993, 1994, 1996, 1998, 2000, 2014, 2015)	Semifinals (1993)
Central Arkansas	MVC champions	November 12	Automatic	None (debut)	—
Clemson	No. 6 RPI	November 13	At-large	30 (1972, 1973, 1974, 1975, 1976, 1977, 1978, 1979, 1981, 1982, 1983, 1984, 1985, 1987, 1990, 1991, 1993, 1995, 1997, 1998, 2000, 2001, 2002, 2003, 2005, 2006, 2013, 2014, 2015, 2016)	Champions (1984, 1987)
Coastal Carolina	Sun Belt champions	November 12	Automatic	14 (1992, 1995, 2001, 2002, 2003, 2004, 2005, 2010, 2011, 2012, 2013, 2014, 2015, 2016)	Round of 16 (1992, 2003, 2012, 2013)
Colgate	Patriot League champions	November 12	Automatic	6 (1959, 1966, 2007, 2008, 2011, 2016)	Round of 16 (1992, 2003, 2012, 2013)
Columbia	No. 29 RPI	November 13	At-large	13 (1970, 1978, 1979, 1980, 1981, 1982, 1983, 1984, 1985, 1989, 1990, 1991, 1993)	Runners-Up (1983)
Dartmouth	Ivy League champions	November 6	Automatic	17 (1964, 1977, 1978, 1990, 1992, 1997, 2000, 2004, 2005, 2007, 2008, 2009, 2010, 2011, 2014, 2015, 2016)	Quarterfinals (1990)
Duke	No. 3 RPI	November 13	At-large	25 (1972, 1980, 1981, 1982, 1983, 1985, 1986, 1987, 1989, 1992, 1993, 1994, 1995, 1998, 1999, 2000, 2002, 2004, 2005, 2006, 2007, 2008, 2009, 2010, 2011)	Champions (1986)
Fairfield	MAAC champions	November 12	Automatic	3 (2006, 2008, 2011)	Second Round (2006)
FIU	No. 21 RPI	November 13	At-large	9 (1991, 1994, 1996, 1997, 2001, 2002, 2003, 2004, 2015)	Runners-Up (1996)
Fordham	No. 26 RPI	November 13	At-large	3 (1996, 2014, 2016)	First Round (1996, 2014, 2016)
Georgetown	Big East champions	November 12	Automatic	7 (1994, 1997, 2010, 2012, 2013, 2014, 2015)	Runners-up (2012)
Indiana	No. 4 RPI	November 13	At-large	41 (1974, 1976, 1977, 1978, 1979, 1980, 1981, 1982, 1983, 1984, 1985, 1987, 1988, 1989, 1990, 1991, 1992, 1993, 1994, 1995, 1996, 1997, 1998, 1999, 2000, 2001, 2002, 2003, 2004, 2005, 2006, 2007, 2008, 2009, 2010, 2011, 2012, 2013, 2014, 2015, 2016)	Champions (1982, 1983, 1988, 1998, 1999, 2003, 2004, 2012)
UIC	Horizon League champions	November 11	Automatic	6 (1999, 2000, 2006, 2007, 2008, 2016)	Quarterfinals (2007)
Lipscomb	Atlantic Sun champions	November 11	Automatic	None (debut)	—
Louisville	No. 5 RPI	November 13	At-large	9 (2007, 2008, 2009, 2010, 2011, 2012, 2013, 2014, 2016)	Runners-Up (2010)
Maryland	No. 25 RPI	November 13	At-large	34 (1959, 1960, 1961, 1962, 1963, 1964, 1967, 1968, 1969, 1970, 1976, 1986, 1994, 1995, 1996, 1997, 1998, 1999, 2001, 2002, 2003, 2004, 2005, 2006, 2007, 2008, 2009, 2010, 2011, 2012, 2013, 2014, 2015, 2016)	Champions (1968, 2005, 2008)
UMass	Atlantic 10 champions	November 12	Automatic	3 (2001, 2007, 2008)	Semifinals (2007)
Mercer	SoCon champions	November 12	Automatic	2 (2001, 2016)	First Round (2001, 2016)
Michigan	No. 15 RPI	November 13	At-large	5 (2002, 2004, 2008, 2010, 2012)	Semifinals (2010)
Michigan State	No. 12 RPI	November 13	At-large	18 (1962, 1963, 1964, 1965, 1966, 1967, 1968, 1969, 2001, 2004, 2007, 2008, 2009, 2010, 2012, 2013, 2014, 2016)	Champions (1967, 1968)
New Hampshire	No. 20 RPI	November 13	At-large	1 (1994)	First Round (1994)
North Carolina	No. 2 RPI	November 13	At-large	24 (1968, 1987, 1988, 1990, 1991, 1993, 1994, 1999, 2000, 2001, 2002, 2003, 2004, 2005, 2006, 2008, 2009, 2010, 2011, 2012, 2013, 2014, 2105, 2016)	Champions (2001, 2011)
NC State	No. 45 RPI	November 13	At-large	13 (1981, 1983, 1984, 1985, 1986, 1987, 1990, 1991, 1992, 1994, 2003, 2005, 2009)	Semifinals (1990)
Notre Dame	No. 10 RPI	November 13	At-large	19 (1988, 1993, 1994, 1996, 2001, 2002, 2003, 2004, 2005, 2006, 2007, 2008, 2009, 2010, 2-12, 2013, 2014, 2015, 2016)	Champions (2013)
Old Dominion	Conference USA champions	November 12	Automatic	13 (1989, 1991, 2002, 2003, 2004, 2005, 2006, 2007, 2010, 2011, 2012, 2013, 2014)	Round of 16 (2006, 2007)
Omaha	Summit League champions	November 11	Automatic	None (debut)	—
Pacific	No. 35 RPI	November 13	At-large	1 (2016)	Second round (2016)
Presbyterian	Big South champions	November 12	Automatic	None (debut)	—
San Francisco	WCC champions	November 11	Automatic	30 (1959, 1961, 1963, 1965, 1966, 1967, 1968, 1969, 1970, 1971, 1973, 1974, 1975, 1976, 1977, 1979, 1980, 1981, 1982, 1983, 1984, 1986, 1987, 1991, 1993, 1994, 2004, 2005, 2006, 2008)	Champions (1966, 1975, 1976, 1978, 1980)
Seattle U	WAC champions	November 12	Automatic	2 (2013, 2015)	Round of 16 (2015)
SMU	The American champions	November 12	Automatic	30 (1979, 1980, 1983, 1984, 1985, 1986, 1987, 1988, 1989, 1990, 1991, 1992, 1993, 1994, 1995, 1996, 1997, 1998, 2000, 2001, 2002, 2004, 2005, 2006, 2007, 2009, 2010, 2011, 2012, 2015)	Semifinals (2000, 2005)
St. Francis Brooklyn	NEC champions	November 12	Automatic	8 (1974, 1976, 1977, 1978, 1982, 2013, 2014, 2016)	Quarterfinals (1978)
Stanford	Pac-12 champions	November 7	Automatic	15 (1962, 1978, 1991, 1992, 1997, 1998, 1999, 2000, 2001, 2002, 2009, 2013, 2014, 2015, 2016)	Champions (2015, 2016)
UNCW	No. 36 RPI	November 13	At-large	2 (2009, 2014)	Second Round (2009, 2014)
Virginia	No. 9 RPI	November 13	At-large	38 (1969, 1979, 1981, 1982, 1983, 1984, 1985, 1986, 1987, 1988, 1989, 1990, 1991, 1992, 1993, 1994, 1995, 1996, 1997, 1998, 1999, 2000, 2001, 2002, 2003, 2004, 2005, 2006, 2007, 2008, 2009, 2010, 2011, 2012, 2013, 2014, 2015, 2016)	Champions (1989, 1991, 1992, 1993, 1994, 2009, 2014)
VCU	No. 13 RPI	November 13	At-large	8 (1997, 1998, 1999, 2002, 2003, 2004, 2012, 2013)	Quarterfinals (2004)
Virginia Tech	No. 22 RPI	November 13	At-large	5 (2003, 2005, 2006, 2007, 2016)	Semifinals (2007)
Wake Forest	ACC champions	November 12	Automatic	20 (1988, 1989, 1990, 1991, 1999, 2001, 2002, 2003, 2004, 2005, 2006, 2007, 2008, 2009, 2011, 2012, 2013, 2014, 2015, 2016)	Champions (2007)
Washington	No. 37 RPI	November 13	At-large	22 (1972, 1973, 1976, 1978, 1982, 1989, 1992, 1995, 1996, 1997, 1998, 1999, 2000, 2001, 2003, 2004, 2006, 2007, 2012, 2013, 2014, 2016)	Quarterfinals (2013)
Western Michigan	No. 8 RPI	November 13	At-large	1 (2003)	First Round (2003)
William & Mary	CAA champions	November 12	Automatic	15 (1980, 1983, 1987, 1992, 1993, 1995, 1996, 1997, 1998, 1999, 2000, 2002, 2008, 2010, 2013)	Quarterfinals (1980, 1996)
Wisconsin	Big Ten champions	November 12	Automatic	6 (1981, 1989, 1993, 1994, 1995, 2013)	Champions (1995)

=== Seeding ===
Seeded teams
Seed	School	Conference	Record	Berth type	United Soccer Coaches ranking	RPI ranking
1	Wake Forest	ACC	17–1–2	Tournament champion	1	1
2	Indiana	Big 10	15–0–5	At-large	2	4
3	North Carolina	ACC	14–3–1	At-large	7	2
4	Louisville	ACC	11–2–4	At-large	9	5
5	Akron	Mid-American	16–3–1	Tournament champion	4	7
6	Duke	ACC	12–4–2	At-large	14	3
7	Michigan State	Big Ten	11–3–3	At-large	15	12
8	Clemson	ACC	12–5–1	At-large	5	6
9	Stanford	PAC 12	15–2–1	Conference champion	3	11
10	Western Michigan	Mid-American	16–3–1	At-large	6	8
11	Virginia	ACC	12–3–5	At-large	8	9
12	Notre Dame	ACC	11–6–2	At-large	12	10
13	Michigan	Big 10	12–5–2	At-large	16	15
14	Georgetown	Big East	14–3–2	Tournament champion	11	19
15	Dartmouth	Ivy League	12–3–1	Conference champion	17	16
16	VCU	Atlantic 10	12–6–0	At-large	22	13

== Schedule ==
2017 Quarterfinal sites (blue) and College Cup (red)

Round	Date
First round	November 16
Second round	November 19
Third round	November 25–26
Quarterfinals	December 1−3
College Cup Semifinals	December 8
College Cup Final	December 10

== Bracket ==
=== Regional 1 ===
First round
William & Mary*	1
Columbia ^{2OT}	2
Butler*	2
Lipscomb	0
Pacific*	2
Cal State Fullerton	1
Coastal Carolina*	1
Mercer	0

Second round
1	Wake Forest*	1
Columbia	0
Butler	3
16	VCU*	2
9	Stanford* ^{PK}	0(4)
Pacific	0(1)
Coastal Carolina	3
8	Clemson*	1

Third round
1	Wake Forest*	2
Butler	0
9	Stanford*	2
Coastal Carolina	0

Quarterfinals
1	Wake Forest*	0
9	Stanford	2

Host Institution*

=== Regional 2 ===
First round
Washington*	2
Seattle ^{OT}	3
Wisconsin*	4
UIC	1
Massachusetts*	0
Colgate	2
California*	1
San Francisco	2

Second round
5	Akron*	3
Seattle	0
Wisconsin ^{OT}	1
12	Notre Dame*	0
13	Michigan*	2
Colgate	3
San Francisco	2
4	Louisville*	3

Third round
5	Akron* ^{OT}	3
Wisconsin	2
Colgate	0
4	Louisville*	2

Quarterfinals
5	Akron^{PK}	0(4)
4	Louisville*	0(3)

Host Institution*

=== Regional 3 ===
First round
UNC Wilmington* ^{OT}	1
Presbyterian	0
SMU*	2
Central Arkansas	0
Fordham* ^{OT}	3
St. Francis Brooklyn	2
FIU*	2
Omaha	0

Second round
3	North Carolina*	2
UNC Wilmington	1
SMU ^{2OT}	2
14	Georgetown*	1
11	Virginia*	0
Fordham	1
FIU	1
6	Duke*	2

Third round
3	North Carolina*	2
SMU	0
Fordham ^{PK}	2(8)
6	Duke*	2(7)

Quarterfinals
3	North Carolina*	2
Fordham	1

Host Institution*

=== Regional 4 ===
First round
Virginia Tech*	2
Air Force	0
Maryland*	0(4)
Albany ^{PK}	0(5)
New Hampshire*	3
Fairfield	0
Old Dominion*	2
NC State	0

Second round
7	Michigan State*	3
Virginia Tech	0
Albany	0
10	Western Michigan*	2
15	Dartmouth*	0(1)
New Hampshire ^{PK}	0(4)
Old Dominion	0
2	Indiana*	3

Third round
7	Michigan State*	3
10	Western Michigan	2
New Hampshire	1
2	Indiana*	2

Quarterfinals
7	Michigan State	1(2)
2	Indiana* ^{PK}	1(3)

Host Institution*

=== 2017 College Cup ===
Semifinals; December 9 Talen Energy Stadium; Chester, Pennsylvania
9	Stanford	2
5	Akron	0
2	Indiana	1
3	North Carolina	0

Championship; December 11; Talen Energy Stadium; Chester, Pennsylvania
9	Stanford ^{2OT}	1
2	Indiana	0

== Results ==
=== First round ===
November 16	Massachusetts	0–2	Colgate	Amherst, Massachusetts
1:00pm EST		Report	Brown 11'; Stroud 38'	Stadium: Rudd Field; Attendance: 722; Referee: Robert Sibiga

November 16	California	1–2	San Francisco	Berkeley, California
4:30pm EST	Sivakumar 46'	Report	Kaminski 50'; Bowman 79'	Stadium: Edwards Stadium; Attendance: 282; Referee: Daniel Radford

November 16	Butler	2–0	Lipscomb	Indianapolis, Indiana
7:00pm EST	Guhl 8', 77'	Report		Stadium: Bud and Jackie Sellick Bowl; Attendance: 389; Referee: Nikola Aleksic

November 16	Coastal Carolina	1–0	Mercer	Conway, South Carolina
7:00pm EST	Pierrot 22'	Report		Stadium: Coastal Carolina University Soccer Field; Attendance: 332; Referee: Bill Dittmos

November 16	FIU	2–0	Omaha	Miami, Florida
7:00pm EST	Nembhard 1'; Marie 26'	Report		Stadium: FIU Soccer Stadium; Attendance: 1,148; Referee: Jose Da Silva

November 16	Fordham	3–2 (a.e.t.)	St. Francis Brooklyn	The Bronx, New York
7:00pm EST	Jann. Loebe 72'; Lewis 81'; Oland 96'	Report	Folla 9'; Saqui 73'	Stadium: Coffey Field; Attendance: 634; Referee: Noel Cotterell

November 16	Maryland	0–0 (a.e.t.) (4–5 p)	Albany	College Park, Maryland
7:00pm EST		Report		Stadium: Ludwig Field; Attendance: 906; Referee: John Brady
	Penalties
	Wild (penalty missed); Williamson (penalty scored); Gasper (penalty missed); Bergmann (penalty scored); Rozhansky (penalty scored); Crognale (penalty scored); Matzelevich (penalty missed); Elney (penalty missed)		(penalty missed) Krutzen; (penalty scored) Khanat; (penalty scored) Solabarrieta; (penalty missed) Iafrate; (penalty scored) Pinheiro; (penalty scored) Assiotis; (penalty missed) Clark; (penalty scored) Steinþórsson

November 16	New Hampshire	3–0	Fairfield	Durham, New Hampshire
7:00pm EST	Schmidt 13', 45'; Piippo 85'	Report		Stadium: Wildcat Stadium; Attendance: 544; Referee: Randall Kelley

November 16	Old Dominion	2–0	NC State	Norfolk, Virginia
7:00pm EST	Perdue 33'; Wilschrey 72'	Report		Stadium: ODU Soccer Complex; Attendance: 1,064; Referee: Mike Gorak

November 16	UNC Wilmington	1–0 (a.e.t.)	Presbyterian	Wilmington, North Carolina
7:00pm EST	Moncada 91'	Report		Stadium: UNC Wilmington Soccer Stadium; Attendance: 1,670; Referee: Brandon Marion

November 16	Virginia Tech	2–0	Air Force	Blacksburg, Virginia
7:00pm EST	Verfurth 54'; Acuña 57'	Report		Stadium: Sandra D. Thompson Field; Attendance: 440; Referee: Mark Kadlecik

November 16	William & Mary	1–2 (a.e.t.)	Columbia	Williamsburg, Virginia
7:00pm EST	Bell 31'	Report	Morant 77'; Rocks 103'	Stadium: Albert–Daly Field; Attendance: 1,476; Referee: Ian Gut

November 16	Southern Methodist	2–0	Central Arkansas	University Park, Texas
8:00pm EST	McLaughlin 50'; Boorom 73'	Report		Stadium: Westcott Field; Attendance: 816; Referee: Nima Saghafi

November 16	Wisconsin	4–1	Illinois-Chicago	Madison, Wisconsin
8:00pm EST	Barlow 44' (pen.), 87'; Catalano 53'; Guitar 71'	Report	Graiber 28'	Stadium: McClimon Track/Soccer Complex; Attendance: 1,078; Referee: Dimitar Chavadrov

November 16	Washington	2–3 (a.e.t.)	Seattle	Seattle, Washington
9:00pm EST	Coffee 24'; Rice 80'	Report	Barry 39'; Rivas 63'; Ruiz 98'	Stadium: Husky Soccer Stadium; Attendance: 1,945; Referee: Josh Wilkens

November 16	Pacific	2–1	Cal State Fullerton	Stockton, California
10:00pm EST	Groenendijk 54'; Vue 84'	Report	Sarr 86'	Stadium: Knoles Field; Referee: Alex De Angel

=== Second round ===
November 19	No. 2 Indiana	3–0	Old Dominion	Bloomington, Indiana
1:00pm EST	Lillard 36'; Toye 49'; Panchot 63'	Report		Stadium: Bill Armstrong Stadium; Attendance: 908; Referee: Aaron Hernandez

November 19	No. 5 Akron	3–0	Seattle	Akron, Ohio
1:00pm EST	Gainford 7'; Holthusen 73'; Zajac 88'	Report		Stadium: FirstEnergy Stadium–Cub Cadet Field; Attendance: 1,739; Referee: Hilario Grajeda

November 19	No. 7 Michigan State	3–0	Virginia Tech	East Lansing, Michigan
1:00pm EST	Sierakowski 5'; Jones 19'; Pimlott 39'	Report		Stadium: DeMartin Soccer Complex; Attendance: 572

November 19	No. 10 Western Michigan	2–0	Albany	Kalamazoo, Michigan
1:00pm EST	Moni 39'; Thornton 62'	Report		Stadium: WMU Soccer Complex; Attendance: 731; Referee: Gregory Dopka

November 19	No. 14 Georgetown	1–2 (a.e.t.)	Southern Methodist	Washington, D.C.
1:00pm EST	Montes 17'	Report	Cano 82'; McDonough 110' (o.g.)	Stadium: Shaw Field; Attendance: 694; Referee: Artur Sibiga

November 19	No. 15 Dartmouth	0–0 (a.e.t.) (1–4 p)	New Hampshire	Hanover, New Hampshire
1:00pm EST		Report		Stadium: Burnham Field; Attendance: 891; Referee: Carlos Fernandes
	Penalties
	Omsberg (penalty scored); Baldwin (penalty missed); Salvati (penalty missed)		(penalty scored) Griffith; (penalty scored) Lamb; (penalty scored) Bauer; (penalty scored) Schmidt

November 19	No. 1 Wake Forest	1–0	Columbia	Winston-Salem, North Carolina
5:00pm EST	Bakero 89' (pen.)	Report		Stadium: W. Dennie Spry Soccer Stadium; Attendance: 2,037; Referee: Guido Gonzales

November 19	No. 4 Louisville	3–2	San Francisco	Louisville, Kentucky
5:00pm EST	Cabon 32'; Wilson 50'; Schmitt 78'	Report	Bowman 44'; Kaminski 55'	Stadium: Lynn Stadium; Attendance: 833; Referee: Shane Butler

November 19	No. 11 Virginia	0–1	Fordham	Charlottesville, Virginia
5:00pm EST		Report	Ohlendorf 83'	Stadium: Klöckner Stadium; Attendance: 949; Referee: Sergio Gonzalez

November 19	No. 13 Michigan	2–3	Colgate	Ann Arbor, Michigan
5:00pm EST	Hallahan 2', 9'	Report	Bellavance 16'; Omorogbe 40'; Ouligian 88'	Stadium: U-M Soccer Stadium; Attendance: 1,413; Referee: Nick Balcer

November 19	No. 16 VCU	2–3	Butler	Richmond, Virginia
5:00pm EST	Fatton 25'; Edvarsen 63'	Report	Lehtinen 54'; Suddick 58'; Guhl 59'	Stadium: Sports Backers Stadium; Attendance: 679; Referee: Bill Dittmar

November 19	No. 6 Duke	2–1	FIU	Durham, North Carolina
6:00pm EST	Moser 19'; Garðarsson 73'	Report	Marie 77'	Stadium: Koskinen Stadium; Attendance: 532; Referee: Mike Stutt

November 19	No. 8 Clemson	1–3	Coastal Carolina	Clemson, South Carolina
6:00pm EST	Wright 20'	Report	Melchor 4', 50'; Pierrot 5'	Stadium: Riggs Field; Attendance: 2,091; Referee: Kevin Broadly

November 19	No. 12 Notre Dame	0–1 (a.e.t.)	Wisconsin	Notre Dame, Indiana
6:00pm EST		Report	Catalano 95'	Stadium: Alumni Stadium; Attendance: 150; Referee: Heber Estrada

November 19	No. 3 North Carolina	2–1	UNC Wilmington	Chapel Hill, North Carolina
7:00pm EST	Pieters 53'; Pineda 56'	Report	Moncada 74'	Stadium: Fetzer Field; Attendance: 910; Referee: Carmen Serbio

November 19	No. 9 Stanford	0–0 (a.e.t.) (4–1 p)	Pacific	Stanford, California
8:00pm EST		Report		Stadium: Laird Q. Cagan Stadium; Attendance: 1,405
	Penalties
	Panchot (penalty scored); Mosharrafa (penalty scored); Baird (penalty scored); Beason (penalty scored)		(penalty missed) Verstraaten; (penalty missed) Riley; (penalty scored) Blackmon

=== Third round ===
November 25	No. 5 Akron	3–2 (a.e.t.)	Wisconsin	Akron, Ohio
4:00pm EST	Gainford 14', 67'; Holthusen 92'	Report	Catalano 26', 77'	Stadium: FirstEnergy Stadium–Cub Cadet Field; Attendance: 2,089; Referee: Sorin Stoica

November 25	No. 3 North Carolina	2–0	Southern Methodist	Cary, North Carolina
6:00pm EST	Skahan 50'; Pieters 83'	Report		Stadium: WakeMed Soccer Park; Attendance: 485; Referee: Chris Penso

November 25	No. 6 Duke	2–2 (a.e.t.) (7–8 p)	Fordham	Durham, North Carolina
6:00pm EST	White 8'; Frick 63'	Report	Jann. Loebe 51'; Dziedzic 87'	Stadium: Koskinen Stadium; Attendance: 494; Referee: Kevin Broadley
	Penalties
	Proch (penalty scored); White (penalty scored); Garðarsson (penalty missed); Fjørtoft (penalty scored); Manley (penalty missed); K. Black (penalty scored); Doran (penalty scored); Brinkman (penalty scored); Wright (penalty scored); Moser (penalty missed)		(penalty missed) Jano. Loebe; (penalty scored) Oland; (penalty scored) Lewis; (penalty scored) Nuhu; (penalty missed) Jann. Loebe; (penalty scored) Miller; (penalty scored) Dziedzic; (penalty scored) Zuccala; (penalty scored) Defilippis; (penalty scored) J. Black

November 25	No. 7 Michigan State	2–1	No. 10 Western Michigan	East Lansing, Michigan
6:00pm EST	H. Barone 43'; Fiscus 54'	Report	Martinez-Bertrand 25'	Stadium: DeMartin Soccer Complex; Attendance: 1,558; Referee: Hilario Grajeda

November 25	No. 2 Indiana	2–1	New Hampshire	Bloomington, Indiana
7:00pm EST	Thomas 10'; Moore 65' (pen.)	Report	Gould 77'	Stadium: Bill Armstrong Stadium; Attendance: 1,487

November 26	No. 1 Wake Forest	2–0	Butler	Winston-Salem, North Carolina
5:00pm EST	Servania 52'; Bakero 86'	Report		Stadium: W. Dennie Spry Soccer Stadium; Attendance: 2,413; Referee: Robert Sibiga

November 26	No. 4 Louisville	2–0	Colgate	Louisville, Kentucky
5:00pm EST	Schmitt 35'; W. Andriot 41'	Report		Stadium: Lynn Stadium; Attendance: 1,302; Referee: Leland Grant

November 26	No. 9 Stanford	2–0	Coastal Carolina	Stanford, California
8:00pm EST	Beason 50' (pen.); Langsdorf 90'	Report		Stadium: Laird Q. Cagan Stadium; Attendance: 924; Referee: Frank Anderson

=== Quarterfinals ===
December 1	No. 2 Indiana	1–1 (a.e.t.) (3–2 p)	No. 7 Michigan State	Bloomington, Indiana
7:00pm EST	Schwartz 60'	Report	Sierakowski 3'	Stadium: Bill Armstrong Stadium; Attendance: 5,450; Referee: Nima Saghafi
	Penalties
	Moore (penalty scored); Buckmaster (penalty scored); Panchot (penalty scored); Toye (penalty missed)		(penalty missed) Sierakowski; (penalty scored) Krolicki; (penalty missed) Centala; (penalty scored) Jones; (penalty missed) Barone

December 1	No. 4 Louisville	0–0 (a.e.t.) (3–4 p)	No. 5 Akron	Louisville, Kentucky
7:00pm EST	Thiaw (penalty missed); Wilson (penalty scored); Kübel (penalty scored); Cabon (penalty missed); Schmitt (penalty scored); Edwards (penalty missed)	Report	(penalty scored) Holthusen; (penalty missed) Belena; (penalty missed) Harter; (penalty scored) Gainford; (penalty scored) Moutinho; (penalty scored) de Vera	Stadium: Lynn Stadium; Attendance: 3,179; Referee: Landis Wiley

December 2	No. 1 Wake Forest	0–2	No. 9 Stanford	Winston-Salem, North Carolina
5:00pm EST		Report	Hilliard-Arce 37'; Werner 53'	Stadium: W. Dennie Spry Soccer Stadium; Attendance: 4,628; Referee: Chris Penso

December 2	No. 3 North Carolina	2–1	Fordham	Cary, North Carolina
6:00pm EST	Wright 61'; Winn 80'	Report	Loebe 63'	Stadium: WakeMed Soccer Park; Attendance: 1,687; Referee: Mike Stutt

=== College Cup ===
==== Semifinals ====
December 8	Akron	0–2	Stanford	Chester, Pennsylvania
6:11 p.m. EST		Report	Langsdorf 26'; Werner 79'	Stadium: Talen Energy Stadium; Attendance: 4,948; Referee: Robert Sibiga

December 8	Indiana	1–0	North Carolina	Chester, Pennsylvania
8:50 p.m. EST	Gutman 50'	Report		Stadium: Talen Energy Stadium; Attendance: 4,948; Referee: Chris Penso

==== National championship ====
December 10	Indiana	0–1 (a.e.t.)	Stanford	Chester, Pennsylvania
1:00 p.m. EST		Report	Werner 103'	Stadium: Talen Energy Stadium; Attendance: 5,764; Referee: Chico Grajeda

== Statistics ==
=== Goalscorers ===
4 goals

- (United States) Mike Catalano — Wisconsin

3 goals

- (England) Sam Gainford — Akron
- (United States) Brandon Guhl — Butler

2 goals

- (New Zealand) Stuart Holthusen — Akron
- (United States) Martin Melchor — Coastal Carolina
- (Haiti) Frantzdy Pierrot — Coastal Carolina
- (France) Paul Marie — FIU
- (Germany) Jannik Loebe — Fordham
- (United States) Tate Schmitt — Louisville
- (Republic of Ireland) Jack Hallahan — Michigan
- (Germany) Robin Schmidt — New Hampshire
- (United States) Jelani Pieters — North Carolina
- (United States) Sean Bowman — San Francisco
- (United States) Bryce Kaminski — San Francisco
- (Honduras) Julio Moncada — UNC Wilmington
- (Spain) Jon Bakero — Wake Forest
- (United States) Tom Barlow — Wisconsin

1 goal

- (Canada) Marcel Zajac — Akron
- (Finland) Alex Lehtinen — Butler
- (England) Lewis Suddick — Butler
- (Senegal) Bass Sarr — Cal State Fullerton
- (United States) Aravind Sivakumar — California
- (Jamaica) Jason Wright — Clemson
- (United States) Ryan Bellavance — Colgate
- (United States) Karl Brown — Colgate
- (United States) Uyi Omorogbe — Colgate
- (United States) Aram Ouligian — Colgate
- (United States) Jared Stroud — Colgate
- (United States) Zach Morant — Columbia
- (Republic of Ireland) Kynan Rocks — Columbia
- (Austria) Matthias Frick — Duke
- (Iceland) Kristófer Garðarsson — Duke
- (Austria) Max Moser — Duke
- (United States) Brian White — Duke
- (Belize) Deshawon Nembhard — FIU
- (United States) Bart Dziedzic — Fordham
- (United States) Matthew Lewis — Fordham
- (United States) Eric Ohlendorf — Fordham
- (Germany) Jörgen Oland — Fordham
- (Nicaragua) Jacob Montes — Georgetown
- (United States) Jacob Graiber — Illinois-Chicago
- (United States) Grant Lillard — Indiana
- (United States) Francesco Moore — Indiana
- (United States) Austin Panchot — Indiana
- (United States) Cory Thomas — Indiana
- (United States) Mason Toye — Indiana
- (United States) Walker Andriot — Louisville
- (France) Adrien Cabon — Louisville
- (Scotland) Adam Wilson — Louisville
- (United States) Hunter Barone — Michigan State
- (United States) Jimmy Fiscus — Michigan State
- (United States) DeJuan Jones — Michigan State
- (United States) Michael Pimlott — Michigan State
- (United States) Ryan Sierakowski — Michigan State
- (United States) Jacob Gould — New Hampshire
- (Norway) Kristian Piippo — New Hampshire
- (United States) Mauricio Pineda — North Carolina
- (United States) Jack Skahan — North Carolina
- (United States) Brandon Perdue — Old Dominion
- (Germany) Max Wilschrey — Old Dominion
- (Netherlands) Bob Groenendijk — Pacific
- (United States) Spencer Vue — Pacific
- (United States) Habib Barry — Seattle
- (Mexico) Sergio Rivas — Seattle
- (Brazil) Gabriel Ruiz — Seattle
- (United States) Christian Boorom — Southern Methodist
- (United States) Jordan Cano — Southern Methodist
- (United States) Garrett McLaughlin — Southern Methodist
- (United States) Leo Folla — St. Francis Brooklyn
- (United States) Nadim Saqui — St. Francis Brooklyn
- (United States) Tanner Beason — Stanford
- (United States) Foster Langsdorf — Stanford
- (Norway) Ulrik Edvardsen — VCU
- (United States) Luc Fatton — VCU
- (Costa Rica) Marcelo Acuña — Virginia Tech
- (United States) Collin Verfurth — Virginia Tech
- (United States) Brandon Servania — Wake Forest
- (United States) Elijah Rice — Washington
- (Spain) Pepe Martinez-Bertrand — Western Michigan
- (United States) Kosti Moni — Western Michigan
- (United States) Ben Thornton — Western Michigan
- (United States) Ryder Bell — William & Mary
- (United States) Mitch Guitar — Wisconsin

Own goals

- (United States) Brendan McDonough — Georgetown (playing against Southern Methodist)

== Record by conference ==
Conference	Bids	Record	Pct.	1st	R32	R16	QF	SF	F	NC
Atlantic Coast Conference	9	9–7–2	.556	2	8	4	3	1	0	—
Big Ten Conference	5	7–3–2	.667	2	4	3	2	1	1	—
Atlantic 10 Conference	3	2–3–2	.429	2	2	1	1	0	—	—
Pac-12 Conference	3	4–2–1	.543	2	1	1	1	1	1	1
America East Conference	2	1–2–2	.400	2	2	1	0	—	—	—
Big East Conference	2	2–2	.500	1	2	1	0	—	—	—
Colonial Athletic Association	2	1–2	.333	2	1	0	—	—	—	—
Conference USA	2	2–2	.500	2	2	0	—	—	—	—
Ivy League	2	1–1–1	.500	1	2	0	—	—	—	—
Mid-American Conference	2	3–2–1	.583	0	2	2	1	1	0	—
West Coast Conference	2	2–1–1	.625	2	2	0	—	—	—	—
Western Athletic Conference	2	1–2	.333	2	1	0	—	—	—	—
American Athletic Conference	1	2–1	.667	1	1	1	0	—	—	—
Patriot League	1	2–1	.667	1	1	1	0	—	—	—
Sun Belt Conference	1	2–1	.667	1	1	1	0	—	—	—
9 other conferences	9	0–9	0,000	9	0	—	—	—	—	—

- The 1st, R32, R16, QF, SF, F, and NC columns indicate how many teams from each conference were in the first round, Round of 32, Round of 16, Quarterfinals, Semifinals, Final, and National Champion, respectively.

== See also ==
- 2017 NCAA Division I Women's Soccer Tournament
- 2017 NCAA Division I men's soccer season
