= 2017 Indiana Hoosiers men's soccer team =

American college soccer season

2017 Indiana Hoosiers men's soccer

NCAA Tournament, Runner-Up
- Conference: Big Ten Conference
- U. Soc. Coaches poll: No. 2
- TopDrawerSoccer.com: No. 2
- Record: 18–1–6 (5–0–3 Big Ten)
- Head coach: Todd Yeagley (8th season)
- Assistant coaches: Brian Maisonneuve (8th season); Kevin Robson (4th season); Zac Brown (1st season)
- Home stadium: Bill Armstrong Stadium

2017 Big Ten Conference men's soccer standings
	Conf.					Overall
Team	W		L		T	W		L		T
No. 11 Michigan +	6	–	1	–	1	12	–	6	–	2
No. 2 Indiana +	5	–	0	–	3	18	–	1	–	6
No. 6 Michigan State +	5	–	0	–	3	13	–	3	–	4
Maryland +	5	–	1	–	2	10	–	5	–	4
No. 10 Wisconsin ‡	4	–	3	–	1	12	–	5	–	5
Ohio State	3	–	5	–	0	8	–	10	–	1
Penn State	2	–	6	–	0	5	–	10	–	2
Northwestern	1	–	7	–	0	7	–	12	–	0
Rutgers	0	–	8	–	0	4	–	13	–	1
‡ – 2017 Big Ten Tournament champion + – Invited to the 2017 NCAA Division I Men's Soccer Championship; As of December 13, 2017; Rankings from United Soccer Coaches

The 2017 Indiana Hoosiers men's soccer team was the represented Indiana University during the 2017 NCAA Division I men's soccer season. It was the Hoosiers' 45th season of varsity college soccer, and their 27th season in the Big Ten Conference.

The Hoosiers finished as runners-up for both the Big Ten regular season, the 2017 Big Ten Conference Men's Soccer Tournament, and the 2017 NCAA Division I Men's Soccer Championship. The Hoosiers only lost one match in regulation or overtime the entire season, finishing with an 18–1–6 record. It was the fewest losses the program posted in a season since 1997, when the Hoosiers finished 23–1–0, and reached the semifinals of the NCAA Tournament. It was also only the fourth time in program history the Hoosiers had only one loss on the season.

== Background ==
In the 2016 season Indiana tied for second in the regular season with Wisconsin. Indiana then lost to Wisconsin in semifinals of the Big Ten Tournament on penalties. Indiana was selected for an at-large bid for the NCAA Tournament, losing in the third round to Virginia Tech.

== Preseason roster changes ==
=== Departures ===
Name	Number	Pos.	Height	Weight	Year	Hometown	Notes
Colin Webb	1	GK	6-1	190	Sr.	San Diego	Graduated
Billy McConnell	2	DF	5-10	154	Sr.	Richboro, PA	Graduated
Tanner Thompson	10	MF	5-7	150	Sr.	Loomis, CA	2017 MLS SuperDraft
Christian Lomeli	30	GK	5-9	135	Sr.	Crown Point, IN	Graduated

=== 2017 team recruits ===
Ten true freshmen joined the Hoosiers ahead of the 2017 campaign. Of the 10, three of the recruits were in-state recruits and six were from the midwest region. Indiana announced their initial recruiting class on February 1, 2017. In March, recruiting class was considered the fifth-best recruiting class by CollegeSoccerNews.com. Seattle Sounders FC Academy, and Sounders U-19 goalkeeper, Trey Muse, made a late commitment to Indiana on May 4, 2017.

Name	Nat.	Hometown	High School	Club	Height	Weight	Commit date
Trey Muse; GK	USA	Louisville, KY	Roosevelt HS (WA)	Seattle Sounders FC	6'4"	195	May 4, 2017
Trey Muse; GK	Recruit star rankings: TDS: CSN: IMG 150: NR						
Jacob Meier; DF	USA	Shakopee, MN	Shakopee HS	Minnesota Thunder	6'2"	170	Feb 1, 2017
Jacob Meier; DF	Recruit star rankings: TDS: CSN: IMG 150: 106						
Mason Toye; FW	USA	South Orange, NJ	Seton Hall Prep	—N/a	6'3"	180	Feb 1, 2017
Mason Toye; FW	Recruit star rankings: TDS: CSN: IMG 150: 100						
Justin Rennicks; MF/FW	USA	Hamilton, MA	Hamilton-Wenham RHS	New England Revolution	5'11"	165	Feb 1, 2017
Justin Rennicks; MF/FW	Recruit star rankings: TDS: CSN: IMG 150: 30						
Griffin Dorsey; MF/FW	USA	Evergreen, CO	Evergreen HS (CO)	Colorado Rush	6'0"	160	Feb 1, 2017
Griffin Dorsey; MF/FW	Recruit star rankings: TDS: CSN: IMG 150: 18						
Thomas Warr; FW	USA	Zionsville, IN	Zionsville HS	Indy Eleven	6'0"	175	Feb 1, 2017
Thomas Warr; FW	Recruit star rankings: TDS: CSN: IMG 150: 58						
Joe Schmidt; MF	USA	Bainbridge, OH	University School	Cleveland Internationals	5'8"	155	Feb 1, 2017
Joe Schmidt; MF	Recruit star rankings: TDS: CSN: IMG 150: 118						
Kyle Barks; MF	USA	St. Louis, MO	De Smet Jesuit	St. Louis Scott Gallagher	5'11"	165	Feb 1, 2017
Kyle Barks; MF	Recruit star rankings: TDS: CSN: IMG 150: NR						
John Bannec; DF	USA	Bloomington, IN	South HS (IN)	—N/a	6'0"	165	Feb 1, 2017
John Bannec; DF	Recruit star rankings: TDS: CSN: IMG 150: NR						
Jacob Gruber; GK	USA	Fishers, IN	Cathedral HS (IN)	Indy Eleven	6'1"	190	Feb 1, 2017
Jacob Gruber; GK	Recruit star rankings: TDS: CSN: IMG 150: 129						

== Review ==
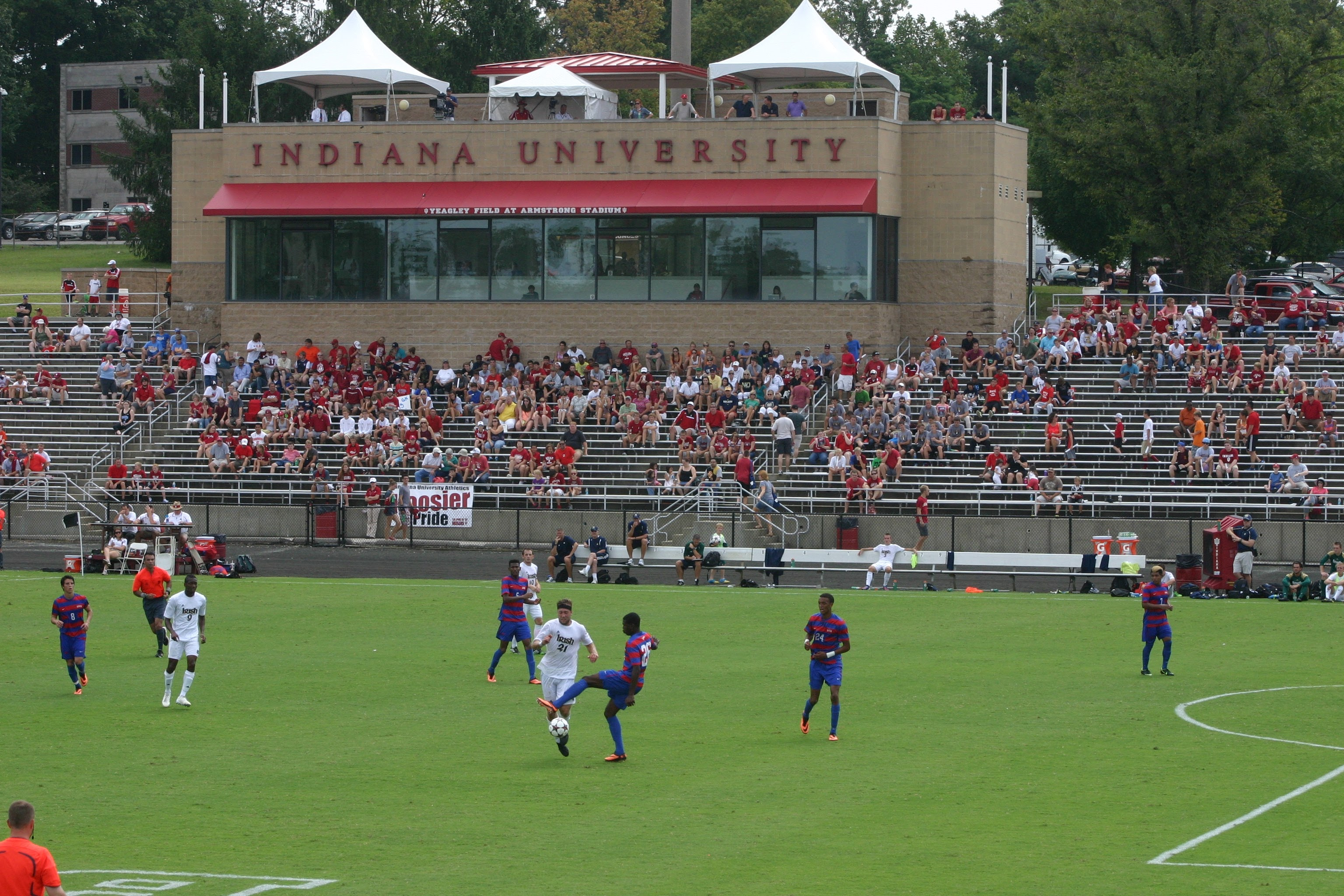
Bill Armstrong Stadium (pictured) hosted the Hoosiers during the season.

The Hoosiers finished the regular season with an undefeated record, being on the only program in the nation to achieve such an accomplishment. During the regular season, the Hoosiers finished 13-0-4 and 5-0-3 in conference play. They finished second in the Big Ten behind Michigan, and were seeded second in the 2017 Big Ten Conference Men's Soccer Tournament. There, the Hoosiers defeated Penn State and Ohio without giving up any goals. In the championship game, the Hoosiers faced Wisconsin, the same program that eliminated them from last year's Big Ten Tournament. After a scoreless draw, the Badgers got the better of the Hoosiers in a penalty shoot-out, giving the Badgers the Big Ten title. Despite failing to win the Big Ten title, Indiana earned an at-large berth into the NCAA Tournament, where they were given the number two-overall seed. This afforded the Hoosiers a first-round bye, where they hosted the winner of the Old Dominion (2017 Conference USA Men's Soccer Tournament champions) vs. NC State (ACC 9th-place finishers) match in the second round. Old Dominion won the match 2–0, meaning the Hoosiers hosted the Monarchs in Bloomington on November 19, in the second round. Goals from Lillard, Toye and Panchot were enough for Indiana, as they cruised to a 3–0 win over Old Dominion.

In the third round, or "sweet sixteen" of the tournament, Indiana hosted the 20th-ranked, New Hampshire (2017 America East Men's Soccer Tournament semifinalists). Thomas opened the scoring for the Hoosiers in the 10th minute, while Moore scored the game-winning goal in the 65th minute, giving Indiana a 2–0 lead over New Hampshire. The Wildcat's Jacob Gould would notch one back in the 76th minute, creating a nervy final quarter hour for the Hoosiers. Despite this, Indiana would hold on to win the match, and advance to their 25th NCAA quarterfinal ("elite eight") and their first since their national championship run in 2012. In the quarterfinals, Indiana was pitted against their conference foes, the seventh-seed, Michigan State. The match, played at Bill Armstrong Stadium in Bloomington was sold out, with a capacity crowd of 5,450 on hand. In the match, the Spartans would score a stunning 2nd-minute goal to put the Hoosiers in an early hole. Michigan State left winger, Ken Krolicki served a cross to Ryan Sierakowski who headed it in the bottom left corner. It was Ryan Sierakowski's ninth goal of the season. The Spartans would hold on to the lead through the first half and through a third of the second half of play. In the 60th minute, Indiana's Swartz headed an inswinging corner kick to tie the match, 1-1. The score would remain gridlocked through the remainder of regulation and the two overtime periods. In penalty kicks, Indiana prevailed over Michigan State, 3–2, giving the Hoosiers their 19th College Cup appearance.

In the national semifinals, Indiana took on a familiar college soccer powerhouse, North Carolina. The cagey match featured a lone goal from Gutman, who scored off a loose ball in the penalty box off a deflected corner kick. The 50th-minute goal from Gutman was the lone goal of the match and enough to send Indiana to its 15th NCAA Division I Men's Soccer Championship Game.

== Roster ==
Note: Flags indicate national team as defined under FIFA eligibility rules; some limited exceptions apply. Players may hold more than one non-FIFA nationality.

No.	Pos.	Nation	Player
0	GK	USA	Sean Caulfield
1	GK	USA	Trey Muse
2	DF	USA	Jordan Kleyn
3	DF	USA	Jacob Meier
4	DF	USA	A.J. Palazzolo
5	DF	USA	Grant Lillard
6	MF	USA	Jack Griffith
7	MF	USA	Trevor Swartz
8	FW	USA	Mason Toye
9	FW	TRI	Rashad Hyacenth
10	MF	USA	Justin Rennicks
11	MF	USA	Cory Thomas
12	MF	USA	Austin Panchot
13	MF	USA	Francesco Moore
14	MF	USA	Griffin Dorsey

No.	Pos.	Nation	Player
15	DF	USA	Andrew Gutman
17	MF	USA	Jeremiah Gutjahr
18	FW	USA	Thomas Warr
19	DF	USA	Rece Buckmaster
20	DF	USA	Timmy Mehl
21	DF	USA	Spencer Glass
22	FW	USA	Ian Black
23	MF	USA	Joe Schmidt
24	MF	USA	Isaac Friendt
26	MF	USA	Kyle Barks
28	DF	USA	John Bannec
29	FW	USA	Josh Lipe-Melton
30	GK	USA	Jacob Gruber
32	GK	USA	Drew Nuelle

== Competitions ==
=== Regular season ===
August 25 1	Indiana	2–0	Cal Poly	Notre Dame, Indiana
5:00 pm ET	Gutman 8'; Toye 72'	Report	Olsen 32'; Carroll (yellow card) 72'	Stadium: Alumni Stadium; Attendance: 746; Referee: Jeff Swartzel

August 27 2	Indiana	1–0 (a.e.t.)	San Diego	Notre Dame, Indiana
11:30 am ET	Dorsey 100'	Report	Brandt (yellow card) 58'; West (yellow card) 88'; Mueller-Wiesen (yellow card) 93' van Wey (yellow card) 97'	Stadium: Alumni Stadium; Attendance: 697; Referee: Josh Kelley

September 1 3	Indiana	5–1	San Francisco	Bloomington, Indiana
8:00 pm ET	Swartz 1'; Toye 19'; Mehl 71'; Thomas (yellow card) 73'; Moore 79'; Hyacenth 83'	Report	Bowman 21' (yellow card) 42'; Orr (yellow card) 44'; Leong (yellow card) 71'; Padilla (yellow card) 73'	Stadium: Armstrong Stadium; Attendance: 1,639; Referee: Dimitar Chavdarov

September 3 4	Indiana	3–0	USF	Bloomington, Indiana
7:05 pm ET	Gutman 14'; Toye (yellow card) 25'; Swartz 62'; Hyacenth 81'	Report	Rodriguez (yellow card) 25'	Stadium: Armstrong Stadium; Attendance: 3,168; Referee: Hilario Grajeda

September 8 5	Maryland	0–0 (a.e.t.)	Indiana	College Park, Maryland
7:00 pm ET	Williamson (yellow card) 16'; Pines (yellow card) 70'; Bergmann (yellow card) 76'; Elney (yellow card) 95'	Report	Thomas (yellow card) 89'	Stadium: Ludwig Field; Attendance: 6,981; Referee: Mark Kadlecik

September 13 6	Indiana	1–1 (a.e.t.)	Michigan	Bloomington, Indiana
7:30 pm ET	Gutman 12'	Report	Mertz 51'; Samake (yellow card) 91'; Cerda (yellow card) 103'	Stadium: Armstrong Stadium; Attendance: 1,831; Referee: Cesar Ibarra

September 17 7	Northwestern	0–2	Indiana	Evanston, Illinois
3:30 pm ET	Buescher (yellow card) 43'; Opperman (yellow card) 57'; McLeod (yellow card) 71'	Report	Toye 10'; Thomas 64'	Stadium: Martin Stadium; Attendance: 1,130; Referee: Carmen Serbio

September 22 8	Indiana	5–0	Rutgers	Bloomington, Indiana
7:30 pm ET	Thomas 32', 59'; Mehl 43'; Panchot 60'; Warr 85'	Report	Guzman (yellow card) 45'	Stadium: Armstrong Stadium; Attendance: 2,084; Referee: Nikola Aleksic

September 26 9	Indiana	1–0	Notre Dame	Bloomington, Indiana
7:00 pm ET	Panchot 67'	Report		Stadium: Armstrong Stadium; Attendance: 4,654; Referee: Peter Dhima

September 30 10	Indiana	5–0	Santa Clara	Bloomington, Indiana
7:30 pm ET	Gutjahr (yellow card) 20'; Lillard 32'; Toye 36'; Gutman 41'; Thomas 41'; Dorsey 65'	Report	Smith (yellow card) 44'	Stadium: Armstrong Stadium; Attendance: 2,668; Referee: Calin Radosav

October 3 11	Indiana	4–0	Evansville	Bloomington, Indiana
7:30 pm ET	Toye 6', 68'; Gutman 58'; Warr 89'	Report	Shuck (yellow card) 71'	Stadium: Armstrong Stadium; Attendance: 1,883; Referee: Brandon Artis

October 7 12	Penn State	0–1	Indiana	University Park, Pennsylvania
7:00 pm ET	Curran (yellow card) 44'	Report	Glass 21'; Thomas (yellow card) 90'	Stadium: Jeffrey Field; Attendance: 1,138; Referee: Nick Balcer

October 11 13	Indiana	2–0	Kentucky	Bloomington, Indiana
7:30 pm ET		Report		Stadium: Armstrong Stadium; Attendance: 2,166; Referee: Alex Beehler

October 15 14	Indiana	2–0	Ohio State	Bloomington, Indiana
3:00 pm ET	Mehl 13'; Gutman (yellow card) 68'Hyacenth 73'	Report	Bumpus (yellow card) 50'; Hummel (yellow card) 50'; Pedersen (yellow card) 74'	Stadium: Armstrong Stadium; Attendance: 2,087; Referee: Calin Radosav

October 18 15	Butler	0–0 (a.e.t.)	Indiana	Indianapolis, Indiana
7:00 pm ET	Sutton (yellow card) 56'	Report	Hyacenth (yellow card) 90'	Stadium: Sellick Bowl; Attendance: 6,105; Referee: Brandon Artis

October 21 16	Indiana	2–1 (a.e.t.)	Wisconsin	Bloomington, Indiana
7:50 pm ET	Barlow 77'; Masbruch (yellow card) 109'	Report	Dorsey 2'; Moore (yellow card) 94'; Toye 109'	Stadium: Armstrong Stadium; Attendance: 2,643; Referee: Nick Balcer

October 29 17	Michigan State	1–1 (a.e.t.)	Indiana	East Lansing, Michigan
3:05 pm ET	Sierakowski 61'	Report	Swartz 25'; Toye (yellow card) 108'	Stadium: DeMartin Stadium; Attendance: 1,793; Referee: Sorin Stoica

=== Big Ten Tournament ===
November 6 QF	Indiana	1–0 (a.e.t.)	Penn State	Bloomington, Indiana
12:00 pm ET	Thomas 97'	Report	Sigue (yellow card) 36'; Hackenberg (yellow card) 72'; Beckford (yellow card) 81'	Stadium: Armstrong Stadium; Attendance: 1,012; Referee: Dimitar Chavdarov

November 10 SF	Indiana	4–0	Ohio State	Westfield, Indiana
2:30 pm ET	Thomas 17'; Gutman 47'; Moore 62'; Panchot 71'	Report	Blackwell (yellow card) 45'; Robertson (yellow card) 53'	Stadium: Grand Park; Attendance: 1,609

November 12 F	Indiana	0–0 (a.e.t.) (2–4 p)	Wisconsin	Westfield, Indiana
12:00 pm ET	Toye (yellow card) 76'	Report	Mueller (yellow card) 107'	Stadium: Grand Park; Attendance: 1,029
	Penalties
	Moore (penalty scored); Swartz (penalty missed); Toye (penalty missed); Panchot (penalty scored)		(penalty scored) Schlenker; (penalty scored) Barlow; (penalty scored) Schilling; (penalty scored) Segbers

=== NCAA Tournament ===
November 19 R2	Indiana	3–0	Old Dominion	Bloomington, Indiana
1:00 pm ET	Lillard 36'; Toye 49'; Panchot 63'	Report	Klosterhalfen (yellow card) 49'; Slotemaker (yellow card) 65'; Rojas-Goodbold (yellow card) 84'	Stadium: Armstrong Stadium; Attendance: 908; Referee: Aaron Hernandez

November 25 R3	Indiana	2–1	New Hampshire	Bloomington, Indiana
7:00 pm ET	Thomas 10'; Toye (yellow card) 29'; Moore 65'	Report	Sahlen (yellow card) 65'; Gould 77'	Stadium: Armstrong Stadium; Attendance: 1,487

December 1 QF	Indiana	1–1 (a.e.t.) (3–2 p)	Michigan State	Bloomington, Indiana
7:00 pm ET	Gutman (yellow card) 27'; Mehl (yellow card) 52'; Swartz 60'	Report	Sierakowski 2' (yellow card) 72'; Freitag (yellow card) 30'; Barone (yellow card) 60'; Centala (yellow card) 86'	Stadium: Armstrong Stadium; Attendance: 5,450
	Penalties
	Moore (penalty scored); Buckmaster (penalty scored); Panchot (penalty scored); Toye (penalty missed)		(penalty missed) Sierakowski; (penalty scored) Krolicki; (penalty missed) Centala; (penalty scored) Jones; (penalty missed) Barone

December 8 SF	Indiana	1–0	North Carolina	Chester, Pennsylvania
8:50 p.m. EST	Gutman 50'	Report	Pineda (yellow card) 85'	Stadium: Talen Energy Stadium; Attendance: 4,948; Referee: Chris Penso

December 10 F	Indiana	0–1 (a.e.t.)	Stanford	Chester, Pennsylvania
1:00 p.m. EST		Report	Skundrich (yellow card) 89'; Werner 103'	Stadium: Talen Energy Stadium; Attendance: 5,764; Referee: Chico Grajeda

== Rankings ==
=== National rankings ===
Ranking movement Legend: ██ Improvement in ranking. ██ Decrease in ranking. ██ Not ranked the previous week. RV=Others receiving votes.
Poll	Pre	Wk 1	Wk 2	Wk 3	Wk 4	Wk 5	Wk 6	Wk 7	Wk 8	Wk 9	Wk 10	Wk 11	Wk 12	Wk 13	Wk 14	Wk 15	Wk 16	Final
United Soccer	7	7	4	1	2	1	1	1	1	2	2	2	2	None Released				2
TopDrawer Soccer	5	5	5	4	1	2	2	1	1	1	2	2	6	8	7	5	3	2
CollegeSoccerNews.com	8	8	6	3	3	3	2	2	2	2	2	2	2	None Released				2

=== Regional rankings ===
Ranking movement Legend: ██ Improvement in ranking. ██ Decrease in ranking. ██ Not ranked. RV=Others receiving votes.
Poll	1st	2nd	3rd	4th	5th	6th	7th	8th	9th	10th	11th	12th
USC Midwest Region	1	1	1	2	1	1	1	1	1	1	1	1

== Statistics ==
=== Competitions table ===
Competition	Started round	Final position / round	First match	Last match
Big Ten regular season	—	2nd	September 8	October 29
Big Ten Men's Soccer Tournament	Quarterfinals	Final	November 5	November 12
NCAA Division I Men's Soccer Tournament	Second round	Final	November 19	December 10

Updated to match played December 24, 2017
Source: Competitions

=== Appearances and goals ===
As of December 11, 2017

No.	Pos	Nat	Player	Total		Regular season		B1G Tournament		NCAA Tournament	
No.	Pos	Nat	Player	Apps	Goals	Apps	Goals	Apps	Goals	Apps	Goals
Goalkeepers
0	GK	(United States) USA	Sean Caulfield	1	0	0	0	0+1	0	0	0
1	GK	(United States) USA	Trey Muse	25	0	17+0	0	3+0	0	5+0	0
30	GK	(United States) USA	Jacob Gruber	0	0	0+0	0	0+0	0	0+0	0
32	GK	(United States) USA	Drew Nuelle	0	0	0+0	0	0+0	0	0+0	0
Defenders
2	DF	(United States) USA	Jordan Kleyn	0	0	0+0	0	0+0	0	0+0	0
3	DF	(United States) USA	Jacob Meier	0	0	0+0	0	0+0	0	0+0	0
4	DF	(United States) USA	A.J. Palazzolo	0	0	0+0	0	0+0	0	0+0	0
5	DF	(United States) USA	Grant Lillard	0	0	0+0	0	0+0	0	0+0	0
15	DF	(United States) USA	Andrew Gutman	0	0	0+0	0	0+0	0	0+0	0
19	DF	(United States) USA	Rece Buckmaster	0	0	0+0	0	0+0	0	0+0	0
20	DF	(United States) USA	Timmy Mehl	0	0	0+0	0	0+0	0	0+0	0
21	DF	(United States) USA	Spencer Glass	0	0	0+0	0	0+0	0	0+0	0
28	DF	(United States) USA	John Bannec	0	0	0+0	0	0+0	0	0+0	0
Midfielders
6	MF	(United States) USA	Jack Griffith	0	0	0+0	0	0+0	0	0+0	0
7	MF	(United States) USA	Trevor Swartz	0	0	0+0	0	0+0	0	0+0	0
10	MF	(United States) USA	Justin Rennicks	0	0	0+0	0	0+0	0	0+0	0
11	MF	(United States) USA	Cory Thomas	0	0	0+0	0	0+0	0	0+0	0
12	MF	(United States) USA	Austin Panchot	0	0	0+0	0	0+0	0	0+0	0
13	MF	(United States) USA	Francesco Moore	0	0	0+0	0	0+0	0	0+0	0
14	MF	(United States) USA	Griffin Dorsey	0	0	0+0	0	0+0	0	0+0	0
17	MF	(United States) USA	Jeremiah Gutjahr	0	0	0+0	0	0+0	0	0+0	0
23	MF	(United States) USA	Joe Schmidt	0	0	0+0	0	0+0	0	0+0	0
24	MF	(United States) USA	Isaac Friendt	0	0	0+0	0	0+0	0	0+0	0
26	MF	(United States) USA	Kyle Barks	0	0	0+0	0	0+0	0	0+0	0
Forwards
8	FW	(United States) USA	Mason Toye	0	0	0+0	0	0+0	0	0+0	0
9	FW	(Trinidad and Tobago) TRI	Rashad Hyacenth	0	0	0+0	0	0+0	0	0+0	0
18	FW	(United States) USA	Thomas Warr	0	0	0+0	0	0+0	0	0+0	0
22	FW	(United States) USA	Ian Black	0	0	0+0	0	0+0	0	0+0	0
29	FW	(United States) USA	Josh Lipe-Melton	0	0	0+0	0	0+0	0	0+0	0

== See also ==
- 2017 Big Ten Conference men's soccer season
- 2017 Big Ten Conference Men's Soccer Tournament
- 2017 NCAA Division I Men's Soccer Championship
