= 2017 Big Ten men's soccer tournament =

- Classification: Division I
- Teams: 9
- Matches: 8
- First round site: U-M Soccer Stadium; Ann Arbor, Michigan
- Quarterfinals site: Higher seeds
- Semifinals site: Grand Park; Westfield, Indiana
- Finals site: Grand Park; Westfield, Indiana
- Champions: Wisconsin (2nd title)
- Winning coach: John Trask (1st title)
- MVP: Tom Barlow and Phillipp Schilling (Wisconsin)
- Broadcast: BTN

2017 Big Ten Conference men's soccer standings
	Conf.					Overall
Team	W		L		T	W		L		T
No. 11 Michigan +	6	–	1	–	1	12	–	6	–	2
No. 2 Indiana +	5	–	0	–	3	18	–	1	–	6
No. 6 Michigan State +	5	–	0	–	3	13	–	3	–	4
Maryland +	5	–	1	–	2	10	–	5	–	4
No. 10 Wisconsin ‡	4	–	3	–	1	12	–	5	–	5
Ohio State	3	–	5	–	0	8	–	10	–	1
Penn State	2	–	6	–	0	5	–	10	–	2
Northwestern	1	–	7	–	0	7	–	12	–	0
Rutgers	0	–	8	–	0	4	–	13	–	1
‡ – 2017 Big Ten Tournament champion + – Invited to the 2017 NCAA Division I Men's Soccer Championship; As of December 13, 2017; Rankings from United Soccer Coaches

The 2017 Big Ten Conference men's soccer tournament was the 27th edition of the tournament. It determined the Big Ten Conference's automatic berth into the 2017 NCAA Division I Men's Soccer Championship. Maryland entered the tournament as the three-time defending champions, but were defeated in the quarterfinals by eventual champions Wisconsin.

This was the second Big Ten Tournament title for the Wisconsin Badgers. The Badgers defeated Indiana in penalty kicks in the championship game.

== Seeds ==
All nine Big Ten schools participated in the tournament. Teams were seeded by conference record, with a tiebreaker system used to seed teams with identical conference records. The top 10 teams received a first round bye and the top four teams received a double bye. Tiebreaking procedures remained unchanged from the 2016 Tournament.

Seed	School	Conference record							
Seed	School	Pld.	W	L	T	GF	GA	GD	Pts.
1	Michigan	8	6	1	1	15	7	+8	19
2	Indiana	8	5	0	3	14	3	+11	18
3	Michigan State	8	5	0	3	13	4	+9	18
4	Maryland	8	5	1	2	15	6	+9	17
5	Wisconsin	8	4	3	1	16	13	+3	13
6	Ohio State	8	3	5	0	6	12	−6	9
7	Penn State	8	2	6	0	6	9	−3	6
8	Northwestern	8	1	7	0	6	16	−10	3
9	Rutgers	8	0	8	0	6	26	−20	0

== Bracket ==
First Round; November 4
8	Northwestern	3
9	Rutgers	2

Quarterfinals; November 5
1	Michigan	4
8	Northwestern	1
4	Maryland	1
5	Wisconsin	2
3	Michigan State	1
6	Ohio State	2
2	Indiana (OT)	1
7	Penn State	0

Semifinals; November 10
1	Michigan	0
5	Wisconsin	4
6	Ohio State	0
2	Indiana	4

Championship; November 12
5	Wisconsin (pen.)	0 (4)
2	Indiana	0 (2)

== Results ==
=== First round ===
November 4
12:00 pm ET

^{No. 8} Northwestern	3–2	^{No. 9} Rutgers
Katsiyiannis 33', 64'; Mazzola 49'	Report	Dovell (yellow card) 17'; Borden (yellow card) 27'; Guzman 65'; Peterson (yellow card) 70' (goal) 73'; Gutierrez (yellow card) 87'

U-M Soccer Stadium, Ann Arbor, Michigan
Attendance: 107
Referee: Peter Dhima

=== Quarterfinals ===
November 5
1:00 PM EST

^{No. 4} Maryland	1–2	^{No. 5} Wisconsin
Elney 28'	Report	Leibold 51'; Segbers 87'

Ludwig Field, College Park, Maryland
Attendance: 642
Referee: Hilario Grajeda

November 5
1:00 PM EST

^{No. 3} Michigan State	1–2	^{No. 6} Ohio State
Freitag 50'	Report	Prosuk 8'; Mohamed 42'

DeMartin Soccer Complex, East Lansing, Michigan
Attendance: 371
Referee: Nikola Aleksic

November 5
6:00 PM EST

^{No. 1} Michigan	4–1	^{No. 8} Northwestern
Atuahene 24'; Hallahan 56', 79'; Mertz 63'	Report	Katsiyiannis 50'

U-M Soccer Stadium, Ann Arbor, Michigan
Attendance: 1,503
Referee: Cailin Radosov

November 6
12:00 PM EST

^{No. 2} Indiana	1–0 (a.e.t.)	^{No. 7} Penn State
Thomas 97'	Report

Bill Armstrong Stadium, Bloomington, Indiana
Attendance: 1,012
Referee: Dimitar Chavdarov

=== Semifinals ===
November 10
12:00 PM EST

^{No. 5} Wisconsin	4–0	^{No. 1} Michigan
Segbers 29'; Mueller 74'; Tom Barlow 82'; Alfaro 89'	Report

Grand Park, Westfield, Indiana
Attendance: Not reported

November 10
2:30 PM EST

^{No. 6} Ohio State	0–4	^{No. 2} Indiana
		Thomas 17'; Gutman 47'; Moore 62'; Panchot 71'

Grand Park, Westfield, Indiana
Attendance: Not reported

=== Final ===
November 12
12:00 PM EST

^{No. 5} Wisconsin	0–0 (a.e.t.)	^{No. 2} Indiana
	Report
Penalties
Schlenker (penalty scored); Tom Barlow (penalty scored); Schilling (penalty scored); Segbers (penalty scored)	4–2	(penalty scored) Moore; (penalty missed) Swartz; (penalty missed) Toye; (penalty scored) Panchot

Grand Park, Westfield, Indiana
Attendance: 1,029

== Top goalscorers ==
Rank	Player	College	Goals
1	(Greece) Tommy Katsiyiannis	Northwestern	3
2	(England) Jack Hallahan	Michigan	2
3	(United States) Sebastian Elney	Maryland	1
3	(United States) John Freitag	Michigan State	1
3	(United States) Neil Guzman	Rutgers	1
3	(Germany) Noah Leibold	Wisconsin	1
3	(United States) Mac Mazzola	Northwestern	1
3	(United States) Ryan Peterson	Rutgers	1
3	(United States) Michael Prosuk	Ohio State	1
3	(United States) Mark Segbers	Wisconsin	1

== All-Tournament team ==
- Tommy Katsiyiannis, Northwestern
- Sebastian Elney, Maryland
- Josh Levine, Penn State
- John Freitag, Michigan State
- Ivo Cerda, Michigan
- Abdi Mohamed, Ohio State
- Francesco Moore, Indiana
- Grant Lillard, Indiana
- Phillipp Schilling, Wisconsin
- Alex Masbruch, Wisconsin
- Tom Barlow, Wisconsin
- Offensive Player of the Tournament: Tom Barlow, Wisconsin
- Defensive Player of the Tournament: Phillipp Schilling, Wisconsin

== See also ==
- Big Ten Conference Men's Soccer Tournament
- 2017 Big Ten Conference men's soccer season
- 2017 NCAA Division I Men's Soccer Championship
- 2017 NCAA Division I men's soccer season
