= 2017 Michigan Wolverines men's soccer team =

Season of football team

2017 Michigan Wolverines men's soccer

NCAA Tournament, Second Round
- Conference: Big Ten Conference
- U. Soc. Coaches poll: No. 14
- TopDrawerSoccer.com: No. 16
- Record: 12–6–2 (6–1–1 Big Ten)
- Head coach: Chaka Daley (6th season)
- Assistant coaches: Tommy McMenemy (8th season); Jhojan Obando (6th season); Marcos Ugarte (1st season)
- Home stadium: U-M Soccer Stadium

2017 Big Ten Conference men's soccer standings
	Conf.					Overall
Team	W		L		T	W		L		T
No. 11 Michigan +	6	–	1	–	1	12	–	6	–	2
No. 2 Indiana +	5	–	0	–	3	18	–	1	–	6
No. 6 Michigan State +	5	–	0	–	3	13	–	3	–	4
Maryland +	5	–	1	–	2	10	–	5	–	4
No. 10 Wisconsin ‡	4	–	3	–	1	12	–	5	–	5
Ohio State	3	–	5	–	0	8	–	10	–	1
Penn State	2	–	6	–	0	5	–	10	–	2
Northwestern	1	–	7	–	0	7	–	12	–	0
Rutgers	0	–	8	–	0	4	–	13	–	1
‡ – 2017 Big Ten Tournament champion + – Invited to the 2017 NCAA Division I Men's Soccer Championship; As of December 13, 2017; Rankings from United Soccer Coaches

The 2017 Michigan Wolverines men's soccer team was the college's 18th season of playing organized men's college soccer. It was the Wolverines' 18th season playing in the Big Ten Conference.

== Background ==
Michigan finished 8th in the Big Ten Conference regular season in 2016 with a 4–11–4 overall record and a 1–6–1 in-conference record. Michigan won in the first round of the Big Ten Tournament against Rutgers but lost in the quarterfinal to eventual champion Maryland. The team did not earn a spot in the NCAA tournament.

== Roster ==
Note: Flags indicate national team as defined under FIFA eligibility rules; some limited exceptions apply. Players may hold more than one non-FIFA nationality.

No.	Pos.	Nation	Player
1	GK	(United States) USA	Andrew Verdi
2	DF	(United States) USA	Marcello Borges
3	DF	(United States) USA	Peter Brown
4	DF	(United States) USA	Billy Stevens
5	DF	(Canada) CAN	Abdou Samake
6	DF	(England) ENG	Daniel Mukuna
7	MF	(Ghana) GHA	Umar Farouk Osman
8	MF	(Chile) CHI	Ivo Cerda
9	FW	(Ghana) GHA	Mohammed Zakyi
10	MF	(Ghana) GHA	Francis Atuahene
11	FW	(England) ENG	Jack Hallahan
12	MF	(United States) USA	Austin Swiech
13	MF	(United States) USA	Ryan Kobakof
14	MF	(United States) USA	Robbie Mertz

No.	Pos.	Nation	Player
15	MF	(United States) USA	Carlos Tellez
16	MF	(United States) USA	Tristan Jacob
17	GK	(United States) USA	Henry Mashburn
18	GK	(United States) USA	Grant Mattia
20	DF	(Canada) CAN	Joel Harrison
21	FW	(United States) USA	Johann Bittner
22	MF	(United States) USA	Joe Hertgen
23	MF	(United States) USA	Marc Ybarra
24	MF	(United States) USA	Lucas Rosendall
25	MF	(United States) USA	Jackson Ragen
26	MF	(United States) USA	Noah Kleedtke
27	DF	(United States) USA	Nash Pirie
28	GK	(United States) USA	Jacob Nunner

== Competitions ==
=== Preseason ===
August 19	Michigan	3–0	Green Bay	Ann Arbor, Michigan
2:00 pm ET		Report		Stadium: U-M Soccer Stadium

=== Regular season ===
August 25 1	Michigan	1–0	William & Mary	Ann Arbor, Michigan
7:00 pm ET		Report		Stadium: U-M Soccer Stadium; Attendance: 456; Referee: Nick Balcer

August 28 2	Michigan	1–1	Valparaiso	Ann Arbor, Michigan
7:00 pm ET		Report		Stadium: U-M Soccer Stadium; Attendance: 381; Referee: Greg Dopka

September 1 3	Michigan	3–1	Cleveland State	Ann Arbor, Michigan
7:00 pm ET		Report		Stadium: U-M Soccer Stadium; Attendance: 665; Referee: Sorin Stoica

September 4 4	Michigan	1–0	Dartmouth	Ann Arbor, Michigan
1:00 pm ET		Report		Stadium: U-M Soccer Stadium; Attendance: 1,046; Referee: Cesar Ibarra

September 8 5	Michigan	2–1	Wisconsin	Ann Arbor, Michigan
7:00 pm ET		Report		Stadium: U-M Soccer Stadium; Attendance: 2,134; Referee: Greg Dopka

September 13 6	Indiana	1–1	Michigan	Bloomington, Indiana
7:30 pm ET		Report		Stadium: Armstrong Stadium; Attendance: 1,831; Referee: Cesar Ibarra

September 17 7	Michigan	0–1	Michigan State	Ann Arbor, Michigan
12:00 pm ET		Report		Stadium: U-M Soccer Stadium; Attendance: 2,637; Referee: Sorin Stoica

September 20 8	Western Michigan	1–0	Michigan	Kalamazoo, Michigan
5:00 pm ET		Report		Stadium: WMU Soccer Complex; Attendance: 2,317; Referee: Khalaf Allatayfeh

September 24 9	Michigan	3–1	Northwestern	Ann Arbor, Michigan
12:00 pm ET		Report		Stadium: U-M Soccer Stadium; Attendance: 975; Referee: Mark Kadlecik

September 27 10	Michigan	1–2	Oakland	Ann Arbor, Michigan
7:30 pm ET		Report		Stadium: U-M Soccer Stadium; Attendance: 903; Referee: Nikola Aleksic

October 1 11	Penn State	1–2	Michigan	State College, Pennsylvania
1:00 pm ET		Report		Stadium: Jeffrey Field; Attendance: 1,285; Referee: Tony Russo

October 6 12	Michigan	3–1	Rutgers	Ann Arbor, Michigan
7:00 pm ET		Report		Stadium: U-M Soccer Stadium; Attendance: 908; Referee: Carmen Serbio

October 10 13	Notre Dame	3–1	Michigan	Notre Dame, Indiana
7:00 pm ET		Report		Stadium: Alumni Stadium; Attendance: 660; Referee: Chico Grajeda

October 14 14	Michigan	2–1	Omaha	Ann Arbor, Michigan
4:00 pm ET		Report		Stadium: U-M Soccer Stadium; Attendance: 937; Referee: Brandon Artis

October 21 15	Ohio State	0–2	Michigan	Columbus, Ohio
7:00 pm ET		Report		Stadium: Jesse Owens Memorial Stadium; Attendance: 1,415; Referee: Sergio Gonzalez

October 25 16	Michigan	1–0	Detroit Mercy	Ann Arbor, Michigan
7:30 pm ET		Report		Stadium: U-M Soccer Stadium; Attendance: 638; Referee: Cesar Ibarra

October 29 17	Maryland	1–2	Michigan	College Park, Maryland
4:00 pm ET		Report		Stadium: Ludwig Field; Attendance: 1,759; Referee: Nikola Aleksic

=== Big Ten Tournament ===
November 5 QF	Michigan	4–1	Northwestern	Ann Arbor, Michigan
6:00 pm ET		Report		Stadium: U-M Soccer Stadium; Attendance: 1,503; Referee: Cailin Radosov

November 10 SF	Michigan	0–4	Wisconsin	Westfield, Indiana
12:00 pm ET		Report		Stadium: Grand Park; Attendance: 0

=== NCAA Tournament ===
November 19 2nd round	Michigan	2–3	Colgate	Ann Arbor, Michigan
5:00 pm ET		Report		Stadium: U-M Soccer Stadium

== See also ==
- 2017 Big Ten Conference men's soccer season
- 2017 Big Ten Conference Men's Soccer Tournament
- 2017 NCAA Division I men's soccer season
- 2017 NCAA Division I Men's Soccer Championship
