= 2017 Maryland Terrapins men's soccer team =

American college soccer season

2017 Maryland Terrapins men's soccer

NCAA Tournament, First Round
- Conference: Big Ten Conference
- Record: 10–5–3 (5–1–2 Big Ten)
- Head coach: Sasho Cirovski (25th season)
- Assistant coaches: Brian Rowland (8th season); Jordan Cyrus (3rd season); David Meiklejohn (2nd season)
- Home stadium: Ludwig Field

2017 Big Ten Conference men's soccer standings
	Conf.					Overall
Team	W		L		T	W		L		T
No. 11 Michigan +	6	–	1	–	1	12	–	6	–	2
No. 2 Indiana +	5	–	0	–	3	18	–	1	–	6
No. 6 Michigan State +	5	–	0	–	3	13	–	3	–	4
Maryland +	5	–	1	–	2	10	–	5	–	4
No. 10 Wisconsin ‡	4	–	3	–	1	12	–	5	–	5
Ohio State	3	–	5	–	0	8	–	10	–	1
Penn State	2	–	6	–	0	5	–	10	–	2
Northwestern	1	–	7	–	0	7	–	12	–	0
Rutgers	0	–	8	–	0	4	–	13	–	1
‡ – 2017 Big Ten Tournament champion + – Invited to the 2017 NCAA Division I Men's Soccer Championship; As of December 13, 2017; Rankings from United Soccer Coaches

The 2017 Maryland Terrapins men's soccer team represented the University of Maryland, College Park during the 2017 NCAA Division I men's soccer season. It was the 72nd season of the university fielding a program. The Terrapins were led by 25th year head coach, Sasho Cirovski.

The season took a downturn towards the end as the Terrapins, then-ranked third in the nation went on a five match losing streak, that saw them fall out of the national rankings, and suffer a quarterfinal-bounce from the 2017 Big Ten Conference Men's Soccer Tournament. Nevertheless, the Terrapins qualified via an at-large for the NCAA Division I Men's Soccer Tournament for the 17th consecutive season. In their sole NCAA Tournament match this season, the Terps hosted Albany, where they lost in penalties.

== Background ==
During the 2016 regular season, Maryland finished as the winners of the regular season as well as the Big Ten Tournament. However, the team lost in the second round of the NCAA Tournament to Providence.

== Roster ==
As of September 26, 2017

Note: Flags indicate national team as defined under FIFA eligibility rules; some limited exceptions apply. Players may hold more than one non-FIFA nationality.

No.	Pos.	Nation	Player
1	GK	USA	Tony Barnes
2	DF	USA	Donovan Pines
3	MF	USA	Miles Stray
4	MF	USA	Paul Frendach
5	DF	GER	Johannes Bergmann
6	DF	USA	George Campbell
7	MF	USA	Connor Smith
8	FW	GER	Gordon Wild
9	FW	USA	Kyle Brewster
10	MF	USA	Amar Sejdic
11	MF	USA	D.J. Reeves
12	MF	USA	Jake Rozhansky
13	MF	USA	Andrew Samuels
14	MF	JAM	Luca Levee
15	FW	USA	Eric Matzelevich
16	MF	USA	Griffin Bouchard

No.	Pos.	Nation	Player
17	MF	USA	Jorge Calix
18	MF	KOR	Paul Bin
19	FW	USA	Eryk Williamson
20	MF	USA	Eli Crognale
21	DF	USA	Aaron Franco
22	FW	USA	Gio Vasquez
23	MF	USA	Keegan Kelly
24	MF	USA	David Kovacic
25	DF	USA	Ben Di Rosa
26	FW	USA	Emmanuel Korvah
27	MF	USA	Matt Di Rosa
28	DF	USA	Chase Gasper
29	FW	USA	Fola Adetola
30	GK	VEN	Alejandro Chacon
99	GK	CAN	Dayne St. Clair

== Schedule ==
Date Time, TV	Rank^{#}	Opponent^{#}	Result	Record	Site (Attendance) City, State
Regular season
August 25*; 10:30 pm, WCCSports.com	No. 6	at Santa Clara	W 4–2	1–0–0	Stevens Stadium (662); Santa Clara, CA
August 28*; 7:00 pm, BTN+	No. 6	Hofstra	W 2–0	2–0–0	Ludwig Field (3,609); College Park, MD
September 1*; 10:00 pm, BTN	No. 6	No. 15 UCLA	W 3–2 ^{OT}	3–0–0	Ludwig Field (7,532); College Park, MD
September 4*; 7:00 pm, BTN+	No. 6	Cal Poly	W 1–0	4–0–0	Ludwig Field (2,469); College Park, MD
September 8; 8:00 pm, BTN	No. 5	No. 4 Indiana	T 0–0 ^{2OT}	4–0–1 (0–0–1)	Ludwig Field (6,981); College Park, MD
September 12; 8:00 pm, BTN	No. 3	Rutgers	W 3–0	5–0–1 (1–0–1)	Ludwig Field (1,329); College Park, MD
September 17; 5:00 pm, BTN+	No. 3	at Penn State	W 2–0	6–0–1 (2–0–1)	Jeffrey Field (1,361); University Park, PA
September 22; 7:00 pm, BTN+	No. 3	at No. 6 Michigan State	T 0–0 ^{2OT}	6–0–2 (2–0–2)	DeMartin Stadium (4,678); East Lansing, MI
September 26*; 7:00 pm	No. 3	at UMBC	T 1–1 ^{2OT}	6–0–3	Retriever SoccerPark (3,766); Baltimore, MD
September 29; 8:00 pm, BTN+	No. 3	Northwestern	W 3–0	7–0–3 (3–0–2)	Ludwig Field (4,015); College Park, MD
October 2*; 7:00 pm	No. 3	at Connecticut	W 3–2	8–0–3	Morrone Stadium (4,160); Storrs, CT
October 6; 7:30 pm	No. 3	at Ohio State	W 1–0	9–0–3 (4–0–2)	Jesse Owens Memorial Stadium (989); Columbus, OH
October 13; 7:00 pm, ESPNU	No. 3	at Wisconsin	W 5–4	10–0–3 (5–0–2)	McClimon Complex (659); Madison, WI
October 17*; 7:00 pm, BTN	No. 3	No. 13 Georgetown	L 0–1	10–1–3	Ludwig Field (2,367); College Park, MD
October 20*; 7:00 pm, BTN+	No. 3	Coastal Carolina	L 0–1	10–2–3	Ludwig Field (4,007); College Park, MD
October 24*; 7:00 pm, BTN+	No. 9	No. 22 VCU	L 0–3	10–3–3	Ludwig Field (820); College Park, MD
October 29; 7:00 pm, BTN	No. 9	No. 19 Michigan	L 1–2 ^{2OT}	10–4–3 (5–1–2)	Ludwig Field (1,759); College Park, MD
Big Ten Tournament
November 5; 7:00 pm, BTN+	(4) No. 23	(5) Wisconsin; Quarterfinals	L 1–2	10–5–3	Ludwig Field (642); College Park, MD
NCAA Tournament
November 16*; 7:00 pm, BTN2Go		Albany; First Round	T 0–0 ^{2OT}	10–5–4	Ludwig Field (906); College Park, MD
*Non-conference game. ^{#}Rankings from United Soccer Coaches. (#) Tournament seedings in parentheses.

== See also ==
- 2017 Big Ten Conference men's soccer season
- 2017 Big Ten Conference Men's Soccer Tournament
- 2017 NCAA Division I Men's Soccer Championship
