= Grand Park (Indiana) =

Sports complex in Westfield, Indiana, US

Grand Park Sports Campus
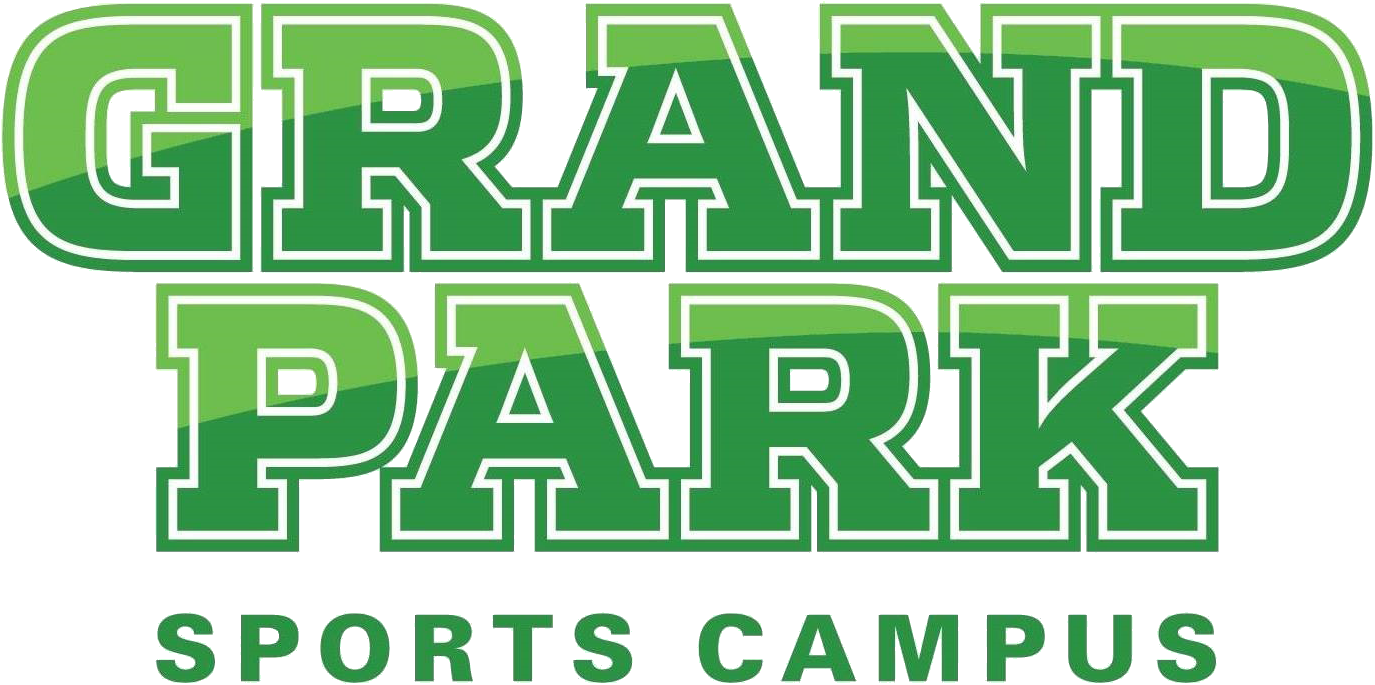
- Interactive map of Grand Park Sports Campus
- Location: 19000 Grand Park Blvd; Westfield, Indiana, United States
- Coordinates: 40°03′29″N 86°08′56″W
- Owner: City of Westfield
- Operator: City of Westfield, Indiana
- Type: Sports complex
- Surface: Various
- Acreage: 400 acres
- Current use: Baseball; Football; Lacrosse; Soccer

Construction
- Groundbreaking: 2012
- Built: 2012–2014
- Opened: June 21, 2014; 12 years ago

Tenant
- Indy Eleven Women (USL W League)

Website
- grandpark.org

Grand Park Sports Campus is a sports complex located in Westfield, Indiana, about 30 miles (48 km) north of Indianapolis. The 400-acre (160 ha) park features 26 baseball and softball diamonds, as well as 31 multipurpose fields for soccer, football, and lacrosse. The Grand Park Events Center features three full-sized indoor soccer fields, a restaurant, and administrative offices. The Pacers Athletic Center indoor basketball/volleyball facility opened in January 2016. Grand Park also features an abundance of green space and more than 10 miles (16 km) of pedestrian/bicycle trails, including the largest trailhead on the Monon Trail.

The site hosted the 2016 Big Ten Conference Men's Soccer Tournament and the 2017 Big Ten Conference Women's Soccer Tournament. Grand Park has also hosted notable appearances such as Machine Gun Kelly and Donald Trump during his 2016 presidential campaign in the main events center. The Indianapolis Colts also uses this site for training camp.

The sports complex was conceived by Westfield Mayor Andy Cook, who campaigned on the issue.

== Facilities ==
=== Pacers Athletic Center ===
The Pacers Athletic Center is an indoor sporting facility on the complex. It hosts five basketball courts, and two multipurpose indoor courts for various sports. The center is privately owned by the Indiana Pacers NBA team. It was purchased from Johnathan Byrd in 2017.

=== Grand Park Events Center ===
The Grand Park Events Center, which opened in the summer of 2016, is a centerpiece of the 400-acre (160 ha) Grand Park Sports Campus, one of the largest sporting complexes in the world. The facility features three full-sized professional turf fields, a spectator lounge, retail space, locker facilities, office and meeting space, and administrative offices. It also includes multi-use space for trade shows, live entertainment, conventionsn and special event programming, including large indoor field sports events in the 370,000-square-foot (34,000 m^{2}) facility. The architect of record is Eric Weflen, AIA; RQAW Corporation

Starting in 2018, Grand Park has been the home field of the Indianapolis AlleyCats, a team in the Central Division of the Ultimate Frisbee Association.

=== Grand Park Baseball Complex ===
The baseball complex features 26 baseball diamonds (8 synthetic turf, all lighted)

=== Grand Park Soccer Complex ===
The soccer complex features 31 soccer fields (7 synthetic turf, 8 lighted). It is the training ground of Indy Eleven. Since 2022, it has been the home field of the Indy Eleven USL W League team.
