= Maximilian Moser =

Austrian footballer

Personal information
- Date of birth: 21 February 1997 (age 29)
- Place of birth: Austria
- Height: 1.78 m (5 ft 10 in)
- Position: Defender

Team information
- Current team: Duke University
- Number: 11

Youth career
- 2003–2011: FC Viktoria Bregenz
- 2011–2015: AKA Vorarlberg

Senior career*
Years	Team	Apps	(Gls)
2015–2016	SC Austria Lustenau II	12	(2)
2015–2016	SC Austria Lustenau	5	(0)

International career^{‡}
2016	Austria U19	3	(0)
- * Club domestic league appearances and goals as of 4 July 2016 ‡ National team caps and goals as of 4 July 2016

Maximilian Moser (born 21 February 1997) is an Austrian footballer currently playing for the Duke University Blue Devils.
