= Mike Catalano =

American soccer player

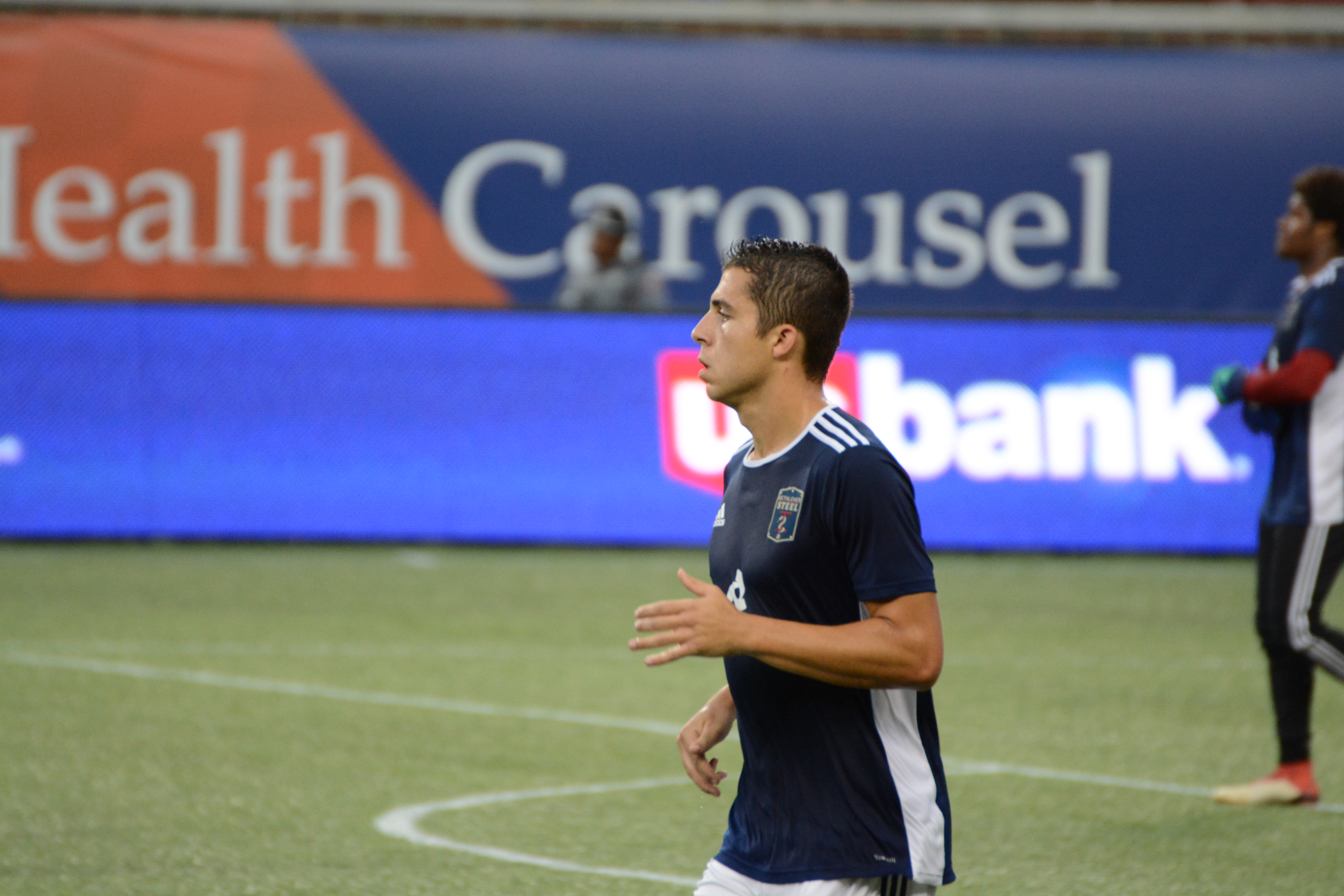
- Taken during a USL regular season match between FC Cincinnati and Bethlehem Steel FC at Nippert Stadium in Cincinnati, USA on June 13, 2018

Personal information
- Full name: Michael Catalano
- Date of birth: September 11, 1995 (age 31)
- Place of birth: Roselle, Illinois, United States
- Height: 6 ft 1 in (1.85 m)
- Position: Midfielder

College career
Years	Team	Apps	(Gls)
2014–2017	Wisconsin Badgers	67	(19)

Senior career*
Years	Team	Apps	(Gls)
2015	Reading United	2	(0)
2017	Chicago FC United	11	(2)
2018	Bethlehem Steel	10	(0)
- * Club domestic league appearances and goals as of 09:28, 15 October 2018 (UTC)

Michael Catalano (born September 11, 1995) is an American soccer player.

== Career ==
=== Youth and college ===
Catalano played four years of college soccer at the University of Wisconsin between 2014 and 2017, where he made 67 appearances, scoring 19 goals and tallying 5 assists.

Catalano also played with Premier Development League sides Reading United and Chicago FC United during his college years.

=== Professional ===
On January 21, 2018, Catalano was selected 54th overall in the 2018 MLS SuperDraft by Philadelphia Union. He signed with the Union's United Soccer League affiliate side Bethlehem Steel on March 1, 2018.

Bethlehem Steel released Catalano at the end of the 2018 season.
