= Francis Atuahene =

Ghanaian footballer

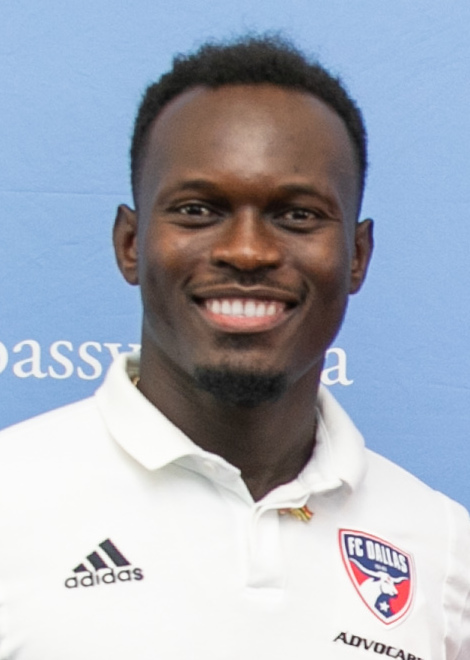

Personal information
- Full name: Francis Takyi Atuahene
- Date of birth: June 8, 1996 (age 30)
- Place of birth: Accra, Ghana
- Height: 1.75 m (5 ft 9 in)
- Position: Forward

Youth career
- –2011: Right to Dream Academy
- 2011–2014: Dover Dreamers
- 2014–2015: Beachside SC

College career
Years	Team	Apps	(Gls)
2015–2017	Michigan Wolverines	49	(24)

Senior career*
Years	Team	Apps	(Gls)
2017	Michigan Bucks	6	(3)
2018–2020	FC Dallas	1	(1)
2018	→ Oklahoma City Energy (loan)	8	(2)
2019	→ Austin Bold (loan)	9	(1)
2020	→ San Diego Loyal (loan)	12	(2)
2021	Memphis 901	18	(0)
2022	Detroit City	29	(2)
- * Club domestic league appearances and goals as of 23:05, 15 October 2022 (UTC)

Francis Takyi Atuahene (born 8 June 1996) is a Ghanaian footballer.

== Career ==
=== Youth and college ===
Atuahene played three years of college soccer at the University of Michigan between 2015 and 2017. He left college a year early to sign a Generation Adidas contract with Major League Soccer ahead of the MLS SuperDraft.

While at college, Atuahene played with USL PDL side Michigan Bucks in 2017.

Before college, he attended The Hotchkiss School where he starred for four years, also running track during the spring season. There, he won a New England Championship as a freshman.

=== Professional ===
On 19 January 2018, Atuahene was selected 4th overall in the 2018 MLS SuperDraft by FC Dallas, who traded $200,000 of General Allocation Money to Montreal Impact for the SuperDraft pick.

On 2 March 2018, he was loaned to United Soccer League side Oklahoma City Energy. He made his debut on 17 March 2018, scoring the only goal in a 1–0 win over Tulsa Roughnecks.

Atuahene made his debut for FC Dallas on 8 June 2019 in a 2–2 draw against the San Jose Earthquakes in which he scored the equalizing goal 42 seconds into his debut.

On 12 June 2019, Atuahene joined USL Championship side Austin Bold FC on loan until the end of the season.

Atuahene was released by Dallas following their 2020 season.

On 21 April 2021, Atuahene signed with USL Championship side Memphis 901.

Atuahene signed with Detroit City FC on March 3, 2022. He left Detroit following their 2022 season.
