= 2016 Big Ten men's soccer tournament =

- Classification: Division I
- Teams: 8
- Matches: 7
- Site: Grand Park; Westfield, Indiana
- Champions: Maryland (3rd title)
- Winning coach: Sasho Cirovski (3rd title)
- Broadcast: BTN

2016 Big Ten Conference men's soccer standings
	Conf.					Overall
Team	W		L		T	W		L		T
No. 7 Maryland ‡	7	–	0	–	1	18	–	1	–	2
No. 9 Indiana +	3	–	0	–	5	12	–	2	–	7
Wisconsin	4	–	2	–	2	11	–	4	–	4
No. 25 Michigan State +	4	–	3	–	1	13	–	5	–	2
Penn State	4	–	4	–	0	8	–	8	–	2
Ohio State	3	–	4	–	1	5	–	13	–	1
Northwestern	3	–	4	–	1	6	–	11	–	1
Michigan	1	–	6	–	1	4	–	11	–	4
Rutgers	0	–	6	–	2	1	–	14	–	2
‡-Tournament champion +- Invited to the NCAA Division I Men's Soccer Championship; As of 13 December 2016; Rankings from NSCAA

The 2016 Big Ten Conference men's soccer tournament was the 26th edition of the tournament. It determined the Big Ten Conference's automatic berth into the 2016 NCAA Division I Men's Soccer Championship. Maryland entered the tournament as the defending champions.

The top-seeded Maryland Terrapins won the Big Ten title for a third consecutive year, defeating the third-seed, Wisconsin in the championship match, 2–1. Maryland's D. J. Reeves opened the scoring 90 seconds into the match, while Wisconsin's Tom Barlow tied the game in the 12th minute. Shortly before halftime, Maryland's Sebastian Elney headed in a Jorge Calix cross to give Maryland the 2–1 lead, which would prove to be the final scoreline. It was the first time since Indiana accomplished the feat in 1996, that a team won three consecutive Big Ten tournaments.

The tournament for the first time in its history was not hosted by a university in the conference. Instead, the quarterfinal matches were played at the campus sites of the higher seed, while the semifinal and championship fixtures were played at the Grand Park in Westfield, Indiana, about 10 miles north of downtown Indianapolis.

== Seeds ==
The top four teams participate in the tournament. The seeding is based on the program's conference record during the 2016 Big Ten Conference season.

Seed	School	Conference	Tiebreaker
1	Maryland	7–0–1	
2	Indiana	3–0–5	
3	Wisconsin	4–2–2	
4	Michigan State	4–3–1	
5	Penn State	4–4	
6	Ohio State	3–4–1	OSU 1–0
7	Northwestern	3–4–1	NWU 0–1
8	Michigan	1–6–1	
9	Rutgers	0–6–2	

== Bracket ==
First Round; Nov. 5
8	Michigan	2
9	Rutgers	1

Quarterfinals; Nov. 6
1	Maryland (2OT)	3
8	Michigan	2
4	Michigan State	2
5	Penn State	1
3	Wisconsin	3
6	Ohio State	0
2	Indiana (a.e.t.)	1
7	Northwestern	0

Semifinals; Nov. 11
1	Maryland	2
4	Michigan State	1
3	Wisconsin (pen.)	1 (4)
2	Indiana	1 (3)

Final; Nov. 13
1	Maryland	2
3	Wisconsin	1

== Results ==
=== First round ===
November 4	^{#8} Michigan	2–1	^{#9} Rutgers	College Park, Maryland
1:00 PM EDT	Atuahene 32'; Cerda 63'	Report	Perez 56'	Stadium: Ludwig Field; Attendance: 139; Referee: Jorge Cuate

=== Quarterfinals ===
November 6	^{#3} Wisconsin	3–0 (a.e.t.)	^{#6} Ohio State	Madison, Wisconsin
1:00 PM EDT	Barlow 53'; Koenig 57'; Mueller 80'	Report		Stadium: McClimon Field; Attendance: 788; Referee: Keith Angel

November 6	^{#4} Michigan State	2–1	^{#5} Penn State	East Lansing, Michigan
1:00 PM EDT	Barone 19'; Fiscus 75'	Report	Maloney 41'	Stadium: DeMartin Soccer Complex; Attendance: 786; Referee: Gregory Dopka

November 6	^{#1} Maryland	3–2 (a.e.t.)	^{#8} Michigan	College Park, Maryland
1:00 PM EDT	Eckenrode 30' (o.g.); Reeves 44'; Campbell 102'	Report	Anderson 42'; Atuahene 51'	Stadium: Ludwig Field; Attendance: 2,637; Referee: Abbey Okulaja

November 6	^{#2} Indiana	1–0 (a.e.t.)	^{#7} Northwestern	Bloomington, Indiana
1:05 PM EDT	Swartz 91'	Report		Stadium: Bill Armstrong Stadium; Attendance: 1,245; Referee: Cesar Ibarra

=== Semifinals ===
November 11	^{#1} Maryland	2–1	^{#4} Michigan State	Westfield, Indiana
12:00 PM EDT	Wild 17'; Sejdic 61'	Report	Niedermeier 86' (o.g.)	Stadium: Grand Park Sports Complex; Attendance: 2,940; Referee: Peter Dhima

November 11	^{#2} Indiana	1–1 (a.e.t.) (3–4 p)	^{#3} Wisconsin	Westfield, Indiana
2:30 PM EDT	Hyacenth 79'	Report	Mueller 56'	Stadium: Grand Park Sports Complex; Attendance: 2,940; Referee: Peter Dhima
	Penalties
	Fives (penalty missed); Thompson (penalty scored); Moore (penalty scored); Panchot (penalty scored); Hyacenth (penalty missed)		(penalty missed) Brotherton; (penalty scored) Barlow; (penalty scored) Schilling; (penalty scored) Radonic; (penalty scored) Mueller

=== Final ===
November 11	^{#1} Maryland	2–1	^{#3} Wisconsin	Westfield, Indiana
12:00 PM EDT	Reeves 2'; Elney 43'	Report	Barlow 12'	Stadium: Grand Park Sports Complex; Attendance: 0 Referee: Peter Dhima

== See also ==
- Big Ten Conference Men's Soccer Tournament
- 2016 Big Ten Conference men's soccer season
- 2016 NCAA Division I Men's Soccer Championship
- 2016 NCAA Division I men's soccer season
