= Austin Panchot =

American soccer player (born 1996)

Personal information
- Date of birth: September 24, 1996 (age 30)
- Place of birth: St. Louis, Missouri, U.S.
- Height: 5 ft 7 in (1.70 m)
- Position: Midfielder

Youth career
- St. Louis Scott Gallagher Soccer Club

College career
Years	Team	Apps	(Gls)
2015–2018	Indiana Hoosiers	82	(13)

Senior career*
Years	Team	Apps	(Gls)
2016–2017	Saint Louis FC U23	14	(3)
2019	North Carolina FC	5	(0)
2020–2021	Union Omaha	24	(1)
- * Club domestic league appearances and goals as of October 31, 2021

Austin Panchot (born September 24, 1996) is an American retired professional soccer player.

== Career ==
=== College ===
Panchot played four years of college soccer at Indiana University between 2015 and 2018, making a total of 82 appearances for the Hoosiers, scoring 13 goals and tallying 9 assists. In his senior season, he helped lead the Hoosiers to the NCAA tournament semifinals, scoring two game-winning goals during their run.

=== Professional ===
On January 9, 2019, Panchot chose to sign with North Carolina FC of the USL Championship.

He scored a goal during an international exhibition game on March 23, 2019, against Club Necaxa. He made his professional debut in a U.S. Open Cup game against the Richmond Kickers on May 15. He made his USL league debut on June 8 in a win over the Tampa Bay Rowdies.

On January 14, 2020, he was announced as part of the roster for USL League One side Union Omaha's inaugural season.

== Personal life ==
Panchot played youth soccer for St. Louis Scott Gallagher Soccer Club. His father, Jeff, played college soccer at North Carolina State. He faced his brother, Logan, in the 2017 NCAA Division I Men's Soccer Championship Game; Logan's Stanford team beat Austin's Indiana team in the game.

While at Indiana, he majored in marketing.
