= Ryan Sierakowski =

American soccer player

Personal information
- Full name: Ryan David Sierakowski
- Date of birth: August 7, 1997 (age 29)
- Place of birth: Barrington, Illinois, United States
- Height: 1.86 m (6 ft 1 in)
- Position: Forward

Youth career
- Sockers FC
- 2013–2015: Chicago Fire

College career
Years	Team	Apps	(Gls)
2015–2018	Michigan State Spartans	81	(33)

Senior career*
Years	Team	Apps	(Gls)
2017–2018	Chicago FC United	11	(6)
2019–2020	Portland Timbers 2	33	(8)
2020	Real Monarchs	14	(1)
2021	New England Revolution II	15	(2)
2021	→ Forward Madison (loan)	12	(6)
2022	Episkopi	0	(0)
2022	South Georgia Tormenta	13	(1)
2023	South Georgia Tormenta	3	(1)
2023–2024	Richmond Kickers	37	(4)
- * Club domestic league appearances and goals as of November 23, 2024

Ryan David Sierakowski (born August 7, 1997) is an American professional manager and former soccer player that played as a forward. He is currently an Assistant Coach for the Portland Timbers U-18 and U-16.

== Career ==
=== Youth and college ===
Sierakowski attended Michigan State University, where he played college soccer for four years between 2015 and 2018, making 81 appearances, scoring 33 goals and tallying 16 assists. Sierakowski holds the record for most career points by a Michigan State University soccer player in the history of the program. Sierakowski is the first, and only, player to lead the team in points (goals and assists combined) in all four seasons of his collegiate career.

While in college, Sierakowski played in the PDL with Chicago FC United.

== Professional career ==
On January 11, 2019, Sierakowski was drafted 23rd overall in the 2019 MLS SuperDraft, by Portland Timbers. He signed with USL Championship side Portland Timbers 2 on March 1, 2019.

On July 9, 2020, Sierakowski was signed by Real Monarchs of the USL Championship. His option was declined by Real Monarchs following the 2020 season.

In March 2021, Sierakowski joined USL League One side New England Revolution II ahead of the 2021 season. He scored on his debut for the club, claiming the winner in 1–0 victory over Fort Lauderdale CF on April 10, 2021.

On August 20, 2021, Sierakowski was loaned to Forward Madison FC, also of USL League One.

Sierakowski was not announced as a returning player for the club's 2022 season where they would be competing in the newly formed MLS Next Pro.

On May 1, 2022, Sierakowski signed with Greek second-tier side Episkopi. However, he returned to the United States soon after, joining USL League One club South Georgia Tormenta on July 28, 2022. Sierakowski left Tormenta following the 2022 season but re-signed with the club on a short-term deal on April 19, 2023. On June 12, 2023, Sierakowski moved to USL League One side Richmond Kickers until the end of the season. His contract option was declined by Richmond following the 2024 season.

On 6 January 2025, Sierakowski announced his retirement. Upon his retirement, he transitioned into a coaching. He returned to his former club Portland Timbers to join their U-18 and U-16 as assistant coach.

== Personal life ==
Born in the United States, Sierakowski is of Polish descent. In 2022, Sierakowski married Lindsey Rudden who ran Track & Cross Country for Michigan State University.
