= Mason Toye =

American soccer player (born 1998)

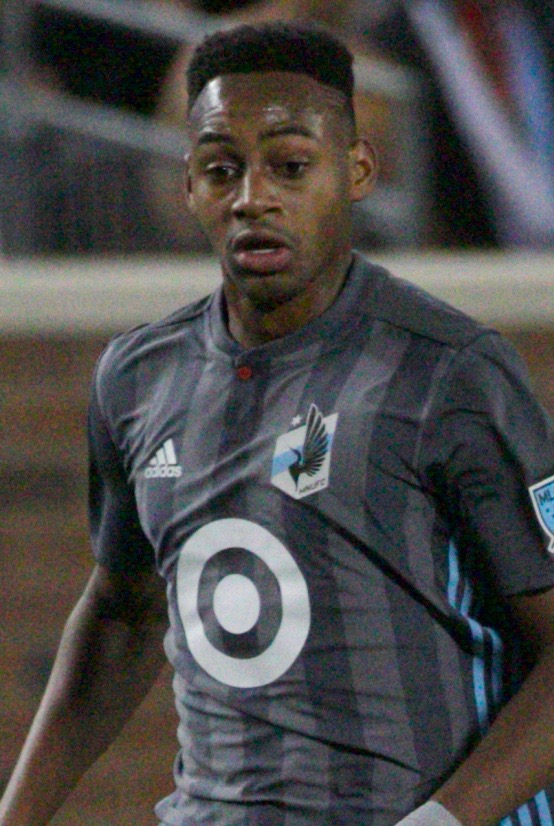
- Toye with Minnesota United in 2018

Personal information
- Full name: Mason Vincent Toye
- Date of birth: October 16, 1998 (age 28)
- Place of birth: South Orange, New Jersey, United States
- Height: 6 ft 3 in (1.91 m)
- Position: Forward

Team information
- Current team: FC Ingolstadt
- Number: 9

Youth career
- 2015–2016: New York Red Bulls

College career
Years	Team	Apps	(Gls)
2017	Indiana Hoosiers	25	(10)

Senior career*
Years	Team	Apps	(Gls)
2018–2020	Minnesota United	42	(7)
2018	→ Colorado Springs (loan)	5	(1)
2019	→ Forward Madison (loan)	7	(0)
2020–2024	CF Montréal	48	(11)
2024	Portland Timbers	5	(0)
2025	Sporting Kansas City	21	(3)
2026–	FC Ingolstadt	2	(0)

International career^{‡}
2019	United States U23	3	(2)
- * Club domestic league appearances and goals as of May 29, 2026 ‡ National team caps and goals as of September 16, 2019

Mason Vincent Toye (born October 16, 1998) is an American professional soccer player who plays as a forward for German 3. Liga club FC Ingolstadt.

== Early life and education ==
Born in South Orange, New Jersey, Mason Toye was a student at The Winston School Of Short Hills during his Primary, Lower, and Middle school years before making his transition to Morristown-Beard School for his first two years of High School. Later Mason transitioned to Seton Hall Preparatory School in West Orange, New Jersey where he graduated in 2017.

Toye played one year at Indiana University before entering the 2018 MLS SuperDraft as a Generation Adidas player. At Indiana University, Toye made 21 starts and 25 appearances throughout the 2017 season. He tallied 10 goals and 2 assists in the 2017 campaign. Toye contributed to an undefeated 2017 season for the Hoosiers who ultimately lost 1–0 to Stanford University in the 2017 College Cup Final. Toye was named Big Ten Freshman of the Year and earned Big 10 All-First Team honors.

== Playing career ==
=== Minnesota United ===
On January 18, 2018, Minnesota United FC drafted Toye 7th overall in the 2018 MLS SuperDraft.

Toye made his professional debut on March 10, 2018, as a 72nd-minute substitute during a 2–1 victory over Orlando City.

Toye scored his first goal for Minnesota United FC in the 89th minute of their U.S. Open Cup match against the Houston Dynamo on June 18, 2019.

He scored his first MLS goal on June 29, 2019, in the 75th minute of their 7–1 victory against FC Cincinnati.

On July 13, 2019, he scored the winning goal in stoppage time against FC Dallas at Allianz Field for a 1–0 victory.

==== Colorado Springs Switchbacks (loan) ====
In August 2018, Toye was loaned out to USL club Colorado Springs Switchbacks FC until the end of the season. He made his league debut for the club on August 11, 2018, in a 2–1 away defeat to the Tulsa Roughnecks. He scored his first professional goal on September 1, 2018, as he scored in the 11th minute of a 3–1 away defeat to LA Galaxy II.

==== Forward Madison (loan) ====
In April 2019, Toye was loaned out once again, this time to Minnesota's USL League One affiliate Forward Madison FC ahead of their inaugural season. He made his league debut for the club on April 6, 2019, in a 1–0 away defeat to Chattanooga Red Wolves SC.

=== CF Montréal ===
On October 1, 2020, Toye was traded to the Montreal Impact, later renamed CF Montréal, in exchange for $150,000 in General Allocation Money for the remainder of 2020, $450,000 in General Allocation Money for 2021, and a second round pick in the 2021 MLS SuperDraft.

=== Portland Timbers ===
On July 23, 2024, the Portland Timbers announced that they had traded their 2nd round pick in the 2025 MLS SuperDraft to CF Montréal for Toye.

On November 1, 2024, the Portland Timbers announced that they had declined 2025 contract options for Toye and two other players.

=== Sporting Kansas City ===
On January 11, 2025, Sporting Kansas City announced that they had signed Toye as a free agent. On April 5, Toye made his Sporting debut as a stoppage-time substitute in a 2–0 win over St. Louis City. Following the 2025 season, Kansas City opted to release him from the club.

=== Ingolstadt ===
On January 14, 2026, Toye signed with FC Ingolstadt in German 3. Liga.

== Career statistics ==
As of July 30, 2023

Appearances and goals by club, season and competition
Club	Season	League			National cup (Note: Includes U.S. Open Cup and Canadian Championship)		Continental		Other		Total	
Club	Season	Division	Apps	Goals	Apps	Goals	Apps	Goals	Apps	Goals	Apps	Goals
Minnesota United	2018	MLS	17	0	1	0	—		—		18	0
Minnesota United	2019	MLS	17	6	5	2	—		1 (Note: Appearance(s) in MLS Cup Playoffs)	0	23	8
Minnesota United	2020	MLS	8	1	—		—		—		8	1
Minnesota United	Total		42	7	6	2	0	0	1	0	49	9
Colorado Springs Switchbacks (loan)	2018	USL Championship	5	1	—		—		—		5	1
Forward Madison (loan)	2019	USL League One	7	0	—		—		—		7	0
CF Montréal	2020	MLS	6	0	—		1 (Note: Appearance(s) in CONCACAF Champions League)	0	1	0	8	0
CF Montréal	2021	MLS	14	7	—		—		—		14	7
CF Montréal	2022	MLS	18	2	—		—		2	0	20	2
CF Montréal	2023	MLS	10	2	1	0	—		1 (Note: Appearance(s) in Leagues Cup)	0	12	2
CF Montréal	Total		48	11	1	0	1	0	4	0	54	11
Career total			102	19	7	2	1	0	5	0	115	21
