= Pittsburgh Panthers men's soccer =

American college soccer team

- 2026 Pittsburgh Panthers men's soccer team
- Founded: 1954; 72 years ago
- University: University of Pittsburgh
- Head coach: Jay Vidovich (11th season)
- Conference: ACC
- Stadium: Ambrose Urbanic Field (capacity: 735)
- Nickname: Panthers
- Colors: Blue and gold
Home	Away

NCAA tournament College Cup
- 2020, 2022

NCAA tournament Quarterfinals
- 1962, 2020, 2021, 2022, 2024

NCAA tournament Round of 16
- 1965, 2020, 2021, 2022, 2024

NCAA tournament Round of 32
- 1965, 2020, 2021, 2022, 2024, 2026

NCAA tournament appearances
- 1962, 1965, 2019, 2020, 2021, 2022, 2023, 2024, 2026

Conference regular season championships
- 1981, 1985, 2024

Conference division championships
- 2020-21, 2021

Pittsburgh Panthers men's soccer is the NCAA Division I intercollegiate men's soccer (association football) team of the University of Pittsburgh, often referred to as "Pitt", located in Pittsburgh, Pennsylvania. The Pitt men's soccer competes in the Atlantic Coast Conference (ACC) and plays their home games at Ambrose Urbanic Field in the university's Petersen Sports Complex. Pitt soccer players have had eight selections as All-Americans and multiple former Panthers have gone on to play professionally. The Panthers have appeared in nine NCAA tournaments and have reached the College Cup twice. The Panthers have been coached by Jay Vidovich since 2015.

== History ==
The Pitt men's soccer program has it origins in 1951 when Leo Bemis, who was then serving as Pitt's director of men's intramural sports, created a pick-up team at the university which played Slippery Rock University to a 1–1 draw. Through 1953, Bemis continued coaching the team which competed intercollegiately as a non-varsity club sport. However, Bemis was able to convince then Pitt athletic director Tom Hamilton to elevate the club team to varsity status in 1954. Despite starting with no scholarships and no feeder system in place to recruit players, Pitt's first team went 8–1 in 1954, and by 1955, the program had its first All-American selection, Jerome Bressanelli. For the first 20 years of the program, Pitt played their games at various facilities including Trees Field, Forbes Field, Kennard Field in the lower Hill District neighborhood of Pittsburgh, and even various high schools, with occasional games played at Pitt Stadium, which at the time was primarily reserved for Pitt's football team.

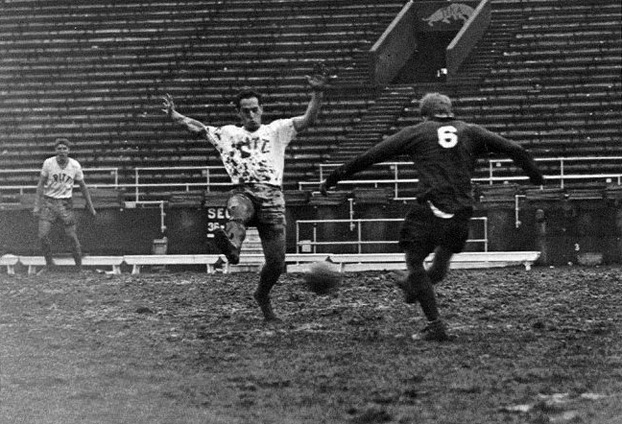
Pitt playing East Stroudsburg in muddy conditions in Pitt Stadium during the first round of the 1965 NCAA soccer tournament

In 1961, the soccer program received funding to provide its first scholarships, and in 1962, Pitt earned its first bid to the NCAA soccer championship tournament, where it lost to Maryland, 3–4. Pitt again qualified for the NCAA soccer tournament championship in 1965, but lost 0–2 on a late goal to East Stroudsburg in game played in muddy conditions at Pitt Stadium. Beginning in 1970, Pitt began play in the Western Pennsylvania Collegiate Soccer Conference (also known as the West Penn Intercollegiate Soccer Conference, or WPISC), a conference that Leo Bemis helped to found and in which he would eventually lead Pitt to a conference championship in 1981. When Pitt Stadium had artificial turf installed in 1970 and flood lighting installed in 1973, the soccer team began regularly playing its home games in the stadium, which remained its home through the 1990s.

After a 30-year tenure as head coach, Bemis was succeeded in 1984 by Joe Luxbacher, a former standout player and captain for the program who also served as an assistant under Bemis. Pitt moved from the West Penn conference to the Big East Conference for the 1985 season. In that first season in the Big East, Pitt finished atop the Big East South Division with an undefeated 4–0 record and appeared in the 1985 Big East Tournament where they lost their first game eventual Big East tournament champion Syracuse. Pitt followed that with a second place in the South Division in 1986. Pitt would also finish second in the regular season conference standings in 1992 and 1995, years when the Big East was not broken into divisions, with Luxbacher winning Big East Coach of the Year in each of those seasons. While a member of the Big East, Pitt would advance to the Big East soccer tournament six times, including in 1995, when an injury riddled team set a program record for number of wins, including victories over 11th-ranked St. John's and fourth-ranked Rutgers. The 1995 team lost in the Big East tournament championship game to St. John's, but finished the season ranked 22nd in the nation in the final Coaches' Poll.

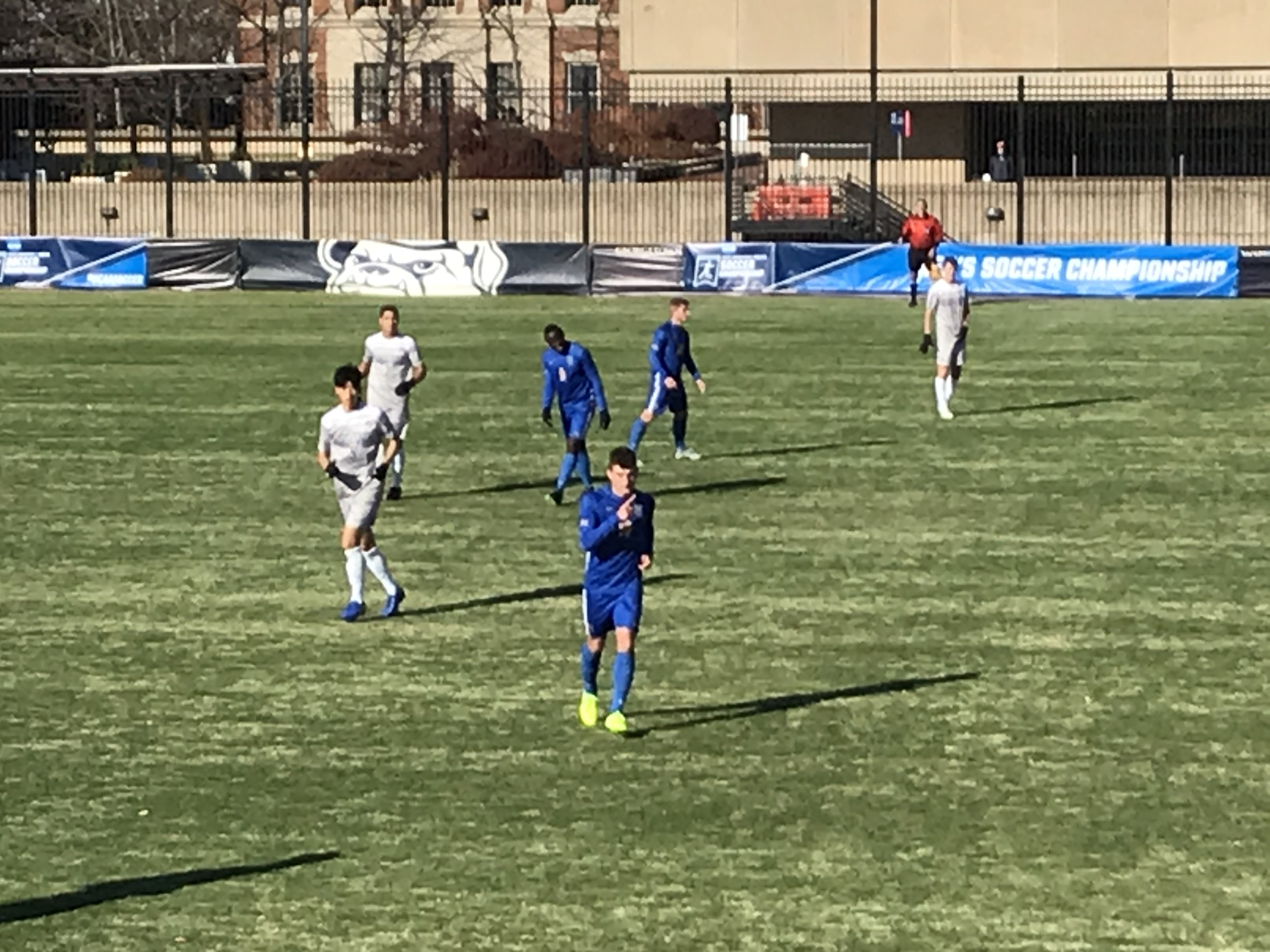
Pitt soccer at Georgetown in the second round of the 2019 NCAA Division I Men's Soccer Tournament

Following the demolition of Pitt Stadium in 1999, the soccer team moved its games to various locations, but primarily played home games at Founder's Field in Harmarville, Pennsylvania, an off-campus venue. The program returned to campus when it moved into the Petersen Sports Complex, which houses the Ambrose Urbanic Field soccer facility, in the spring of 2011. Ambrose Urbanic Field, which serves as both the practice and competition venue for the Pitt soccer team, contains 735 seats and a FIFA-certified "Duraspine" pitch. The first game held at the soccer facility was an exhibition played by the men's team against the Pittsburgh Riverhounds on March 20, 2011. The team also uses the on-campus Cost Sports Center for indoor practice during inclement weather.

In 2013, Pitt moved to the Atlantic Coast Conference (ACC), bringing the Panthers into another historically strong league with 15 national championships in men's soccer. Luxbacher retired as coach following the 2015 season. Jay Vidovich, a former national collegiate coach of the year, was hired as Pitt's head soccer coach in 2015, and has led Pitt to top 25 rankings, seven NCAA tournament appearances, and two College Cups.

== Players ==
=== Current squad ===
As of 12 Sep 2024

Note: Flags indicate national team as defined under FIFA eligibility rules; some limited exceptions apply. Players may hold more than one non-FIFA nationality.

No.	Pos.	Nation	Player
0	GK	USA	Cabral Carter
2	DF	USA	Jackson Gilman
4	DF	ESP	Daniel Gamboa
5	DF	SUI	Niklas Soerensen
6	MF	USA	Logan Oliver
7	MF	EGY	Kareem Ahmed
8	MF	COL	Felipe Mercado
9	FW	NOR	Albert Thorsen
10	MF	BRA	Guilherme Feitosa
11	MF	DEN	Casper Grening
12	DF	FRA	Mateo Maillefaud
13	DF	USA	Noah Hall
14	MF	ESP	Arnau Vilamitjana
15	FW	USA	Zahir Dyke
16	FW	GER	Tim Baierlein

No.	Pos.	Nation	Player
17	FW	USA	Luis Sahmkow
18	MF	USA	Joshua Veychek
19	DF	USA	Mason Dancy
20	MF	USA	Mateo Stoka
21	DF	NOR	Casper Svendby
21	FW	DEN	Lasse Dahl
23	FW	USA	Massimo Murania
25	FW	USA	Eben McIntyre
26	MF	USA	Michael Sullivan
27	FW	USA	Alex Hauskrecht
28	MF	USA	Santiago Ferreira
29	DF	USA	Owen Christopher
31	GK	USA	Jack Moxom
32	GK	USA	Cooper Sisson

=== MLS SuperDraft ===
Pitt players selected in the MLS SuperDraft.

Draft Year	Player	Position	Round	Overall selection	MLS team
2018	Pol Calvert Planellas	MF	2nd	24	Los Angeles FC
2019	Javi Perez	MF	3rd	64th	Los Angeles FC
2021	Edward Kizza	FW	1st	24th	New England Revolution
2022	Arturo Ordoñez	DF	2nd	39th	Houston Dynamo
2022	Jasper Löeffelsend	DF	3rd	81st	Real Salt Lake
2023	Bertin Jacquesson	FW	1st	16th	Real Salt Lake
2023	Valentin Noël	MF	1st	20th	Austin FC
2023	Jackson Walti	MF	2nd	56th	Austin FC
2024	Filip Mirkovic	MF	2nd	54th	Orlando City SC
2025	Michael Sullivan	MF	2nd	39th	Toronto FC
2026	Jackson Gilman	DF	2nd	36th	Toronto FC
2026	Niklas Soerensen	DF	2nd	48th	Real Salt Lake

=== Current professionals ===
As of March 19, 2025

- (United States) Robby Dambrot (2017–2018) – Currently with Loudoun United FC
- (Uganda) Edward Kizza (2017–2019) – Currently with Indy Eleven
- (United States) Shane Wiedt (2018) – Currently with Detroit City FC
- (United States) Johan Peñaranda (2018–2019) – Currently with FC Tulsa
- (United States) Jackson Wälti (2018–2023) – Currently with Pittsburgh Riverhounds SC
- (Spain) Arturo Ordoñez (2019–2021) – Currently with Louisville City FC
- (United States) Veljko Petković (2019–2021) – Currently with Minnesota United FC 2
- (United States) Bryce Washington (2019–2021) – Currently with North Carolina FC
- (France) Valentin Noël (2019–2022) – Currently with Las Vegas Lights FC
- (Spain) Nico Campuzano (2020–2021) – Currently with Lexington SC
- (Germany) Jasper Löffelsend (2020–2021) – Currently with San Diego FC
- Mohammed Abualnadi (2021–2022) – Currently with Selangor F.C. and Jordan international
- (Netherlands) Joe van der Sar (2021–2022) – Currently with Koninklijke HFC
- (United States) Michael Sullivan (2021–2024) – Currently with Toronto FC II

== Coaching staff ==
=== Current technical staff ===
Position	Staff
Athletic director	Allen Greene
Head coach	Jay Vidovich
Assistant coach	Bryce Cregan
Assistant coach	Josh Oldroyd
Assistant coach	Zack Schilawski

=== All-time head coaches ===
As of March 20, 2025

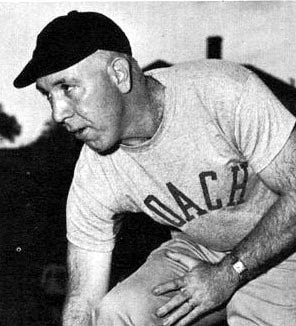
Leo Bemis founded soccer as a varsity sport at Pitt

Nat.	Name	Period	Pl.	W	L	D	Honours	Notes
USA	Leo Bemis	1954–1983	355	166	163	26		
USA	Joe Luxbacher	1984–2015	560	224	267	69	1992 Big East Coach of the Year; 1995 Big East Coach of the Year	
USA	Jay Vidovich	2015–present	202	109	74	19	2020 ACC Coach of the Year; 2021 ACC Coach of the Year; 2024 ACC Coach of the Year	

== Awards and honors ==
=== All-Americans ===
Pitt has had nine different players and nine all-time All-American selections.

- 1955 Jerome Bressanelli, halfback
- 1956 Jerome Bressanelli, halfback
- 1958 Ronald Wyatt, fullback
- 1959 Ronald Wyatt, fullback
- 1959 George Zanicoupolous, goalkeeper
- 1962 Paul Liberati, left halfback
- 1963 Dave Reichenbach, outside left
- 1965 George N.J. Sommer, III, left halfback
- 2020 Valentin Noel, midfielder
- 2021 Jasper Löeffelsend, defender
- 2024 Casper Svendby, defender

=== Big East honors ===
Pitt played soccer as a member of the Big East Conference from 1985 to 2012. During this time, Pitt's Joe Luxbacher won the Big East Coach of the Year award twice, Ben Garry was named to the Big East All-Rookie team, and Pitt had seven other All-Big East Team selections. Players all garnered multiple Big East Scholar-Athlete Awards with over 100 players being named Big East Academic All-Stars.

- Coach of the Year

Joe Luxbacher, 1992, 1995

- All-Rookie Team

Ben Garry, 1997

- All-Big East Team selections

Charlie Wasson, B, Second Team, 1993
Jeff Porter, M, Second Team, 1995
Chris Churchill, B, Second Team, 2000
Ben Gary, M, Second Team, 2000
Justin Gaul, GK, Third Team, 2002
Keeyan Young, F, Second Team, 2003, 2004

- Scholar-Athlete Award winners

Peter Veltri, 2001-02
Jacob Kring, 2004-05
Thomas DeCato, 2005-06
Brendon Smith, 2006-07
Matt Baker, 2009-10

=== ACC Honors ===
In 2013, Pittsburgh began play in the Atlantic Coast Conference. The Panthers did not receive an all-conference award until 2020, when they won five out of the six all-conference awards.

- ACC Coach of the Year

Jay Vidovich, 2020, 2021, 2024

- Offensive Player of the Year

Valentin Noel, 2020

- Defensive Player of the Year

Jasper Löeffelsend, 2020, 2021
Casper Svendby, 2024

- Freshman of the Year

Bertin Jacquesson, 2020
