= Petersen Sports Complex =

University of Pittsburgh facility

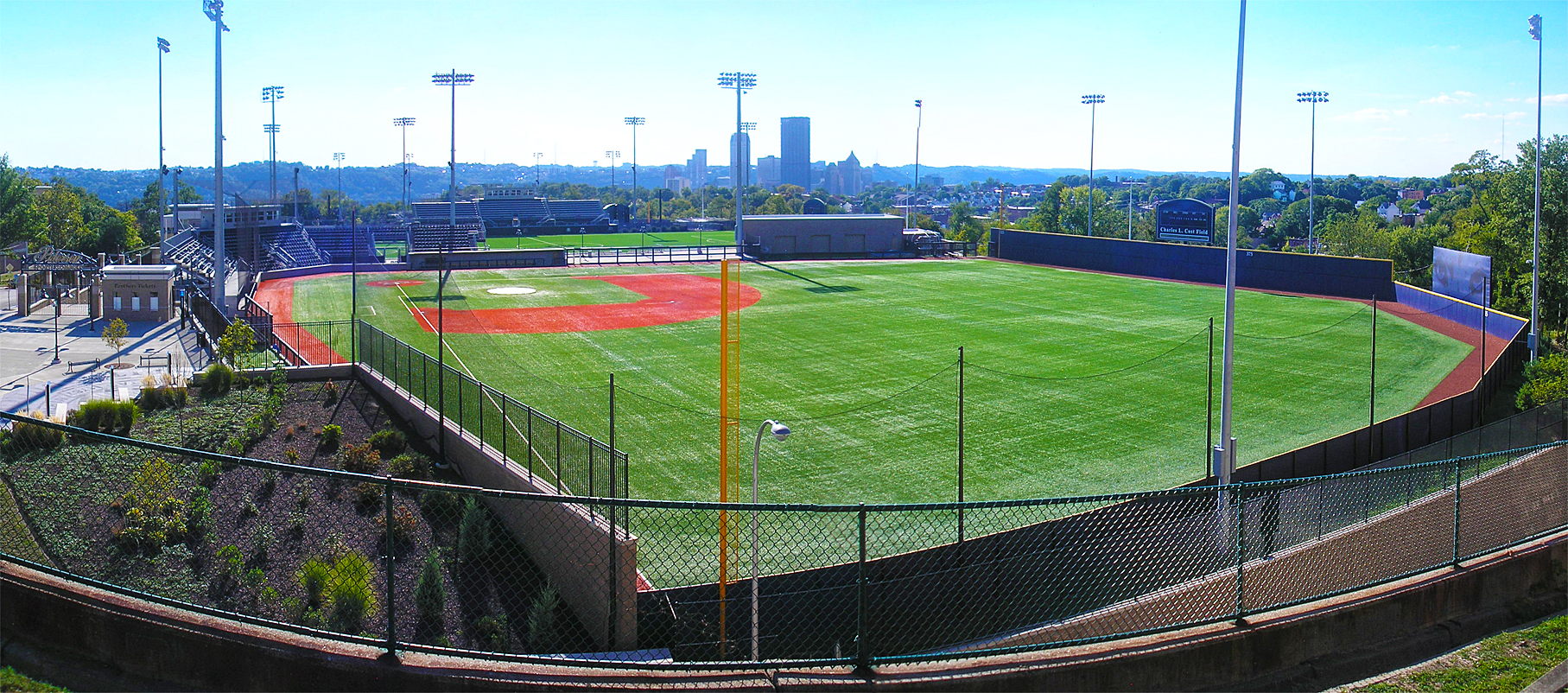
- One of the complex's venues in 2012

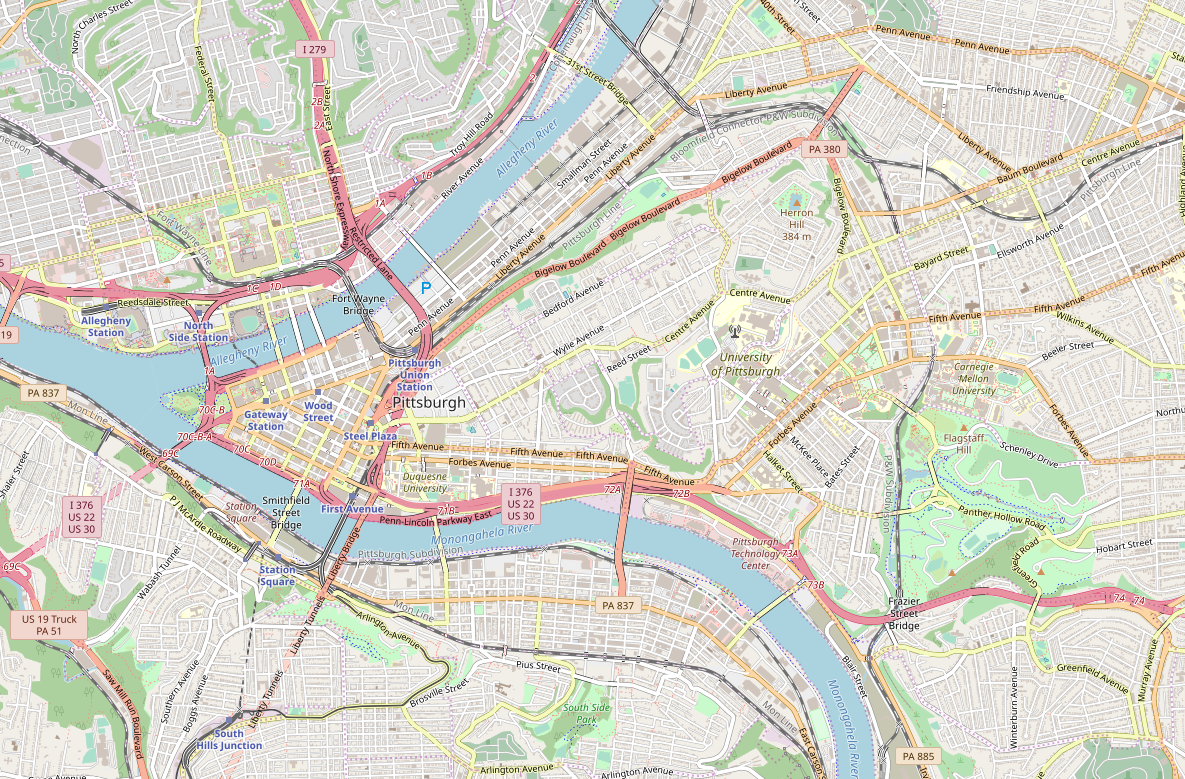
- Location near Downtown Pittsburgh Location in Pennsylvania Location in the United States
- Former names: Olympic Sports Complex
- Location: Robinson Street Extension, Pittsburgh, Pennsylvania, USA
- Coordinates: 40.444612°N 79.966535°W
- Owner: University of Pittsburgh
- Operator: Univ. of Pittsburgh Athletics
- Capacity: List: Ambrose Urbanic Field (soccer): 735; Charles L. Cost Field (baseball): 900; Vartabedian Field (softball): 600
- Type: Sports complex
- Surface: FieldTurf (baseball/softball: Classic; soccer: Duraspine)
- Scoreboard: Yes
- Field size: List: Ambrose Urbanic Field (soccer): 76 yards (69 m) wide by 120 yards (110 m) long; Charles L. Cost Field (baseball): 300 feet (91 m) base lines, 375 feet (114 m) power alleys, and 405 feet (123 m) center field; Vartabedian Field (softball): 200 feet (61 m) symmetrically around the outfield
- Current use: Baseball; Softball; Soccer

Construction
- Groundbreaking: 2008
- Opened: March 16, 2011; 15 years ago
- Cost: $29 million
- Architects: L. Robert Kimball and Associates

Tenants
- Pittsburgh Panthers (baseball, men's and women's soccer, softball)

Website
- pittsburghpanthers.com/psc

The Petersen Sports Complex (PSC) is a 12.32-acre (4.99 ha) sports complex on the campus of the University of Pittsburgh in Pittsburgh, Pennsylvania. It houses Charles L. Cost Field, Vartabedian Field, and Ambrose Urbanic Field, the respective home practice and competition venues of the university's NCAA Division I varsity athletic baseball, softball, and men's and women's soccer teams.

Known as the Pittsburgh (Pitt) Panthers, these teams compete in the Atlantic Coast Conference. The complex is located adjacent to the school's Trees Hall and Cost Sports Center near the remainder of the university's other upper campus athletic facilities.

== History ==
The sports complex was a project that had been in development since the 1999 closure of Pitt Stadium on the university's campus. With the demolition of the stadium, the soccer teams, track & field teams, marching band and many intramural programs of the university lost their homes. The university's baseball and softball teams had long been playing in what had been deemed as inadequate facilities on Trees Field tucked behind the school's indoor Cost Sports Center. In the interim, the soccer teams had moved their home games to off-campus Founders Field in Cheswick.

The complex was built on the former Robinson Court housing project. The land was obtained after five years of sometimes contentious negotiations between the university, a housing developer, and the City of Pittsburgh. The final cost of the 12.3-acre (50,000 m^{2}) site for the university was a total contribution of $7 million in payments and community contributions which doubled the 2005 bid of several developers. The land sale was formally approved and Pitt acquired the parcel in the second half of 2008. Ground was broken on the complex in the fall of that year. The estimated cost of the complex's construction is $29 million. It is named after alumnus John Petersen and his wife Gertrude who donated an undisclosed amount for its construction.

The baseball field has been named Charles L. Cost Field, after an alumnus who is also the namesake of the neighboring Cost Sports Center, while the softball field has been named Vartabedian Field and the soccer field has been named Ambrose Urbanic Field. The Petersen Sports Complex hosted its first official athletic contest with a March 16, 2011 baseball game between Pitt and Kent State. Grand opening ceremonies, termed the "First Pitch Event", occurred on April 9, 2011, and featured contests involving all four sports teams that will use the facility.

Following completion of the sports complex, the former baseball and softball facilities on Trees Field are planned to be turned into a new track and field complex.

== Complex ==
The Petersen Sports Complex includes three competition and practice venues, including for baseball, softball and men's and women's soccer. In addition, the complex includes a two-story, 23,000-square-foot (2,100 m^{2}) support building that houses locker rooms for each sport as well as dedicated equipment and athletic training facilities. An indoor batting practice facility, serving both the baseball and softball teams, is also contained within the facility and is located adjacent to baseball's Charles L. Cost Field.

A concessions area is located within the portion of the support building that runs along the southeast goal line of the Ambrose Urbanic soccer field. Outside of the facility, a ticket book is adjacent to an entrance plaza that contains a depiction of the University of Pittsburgh's seal in its granite surface. Within the entrance plaza is a statue of the silhouette of an athlete representing each of the fours teams that call the complex home. Behind each of these figures are plaques honoring those that contributed to the construction of the facility.

=== Ambrose Urbanic Field ===
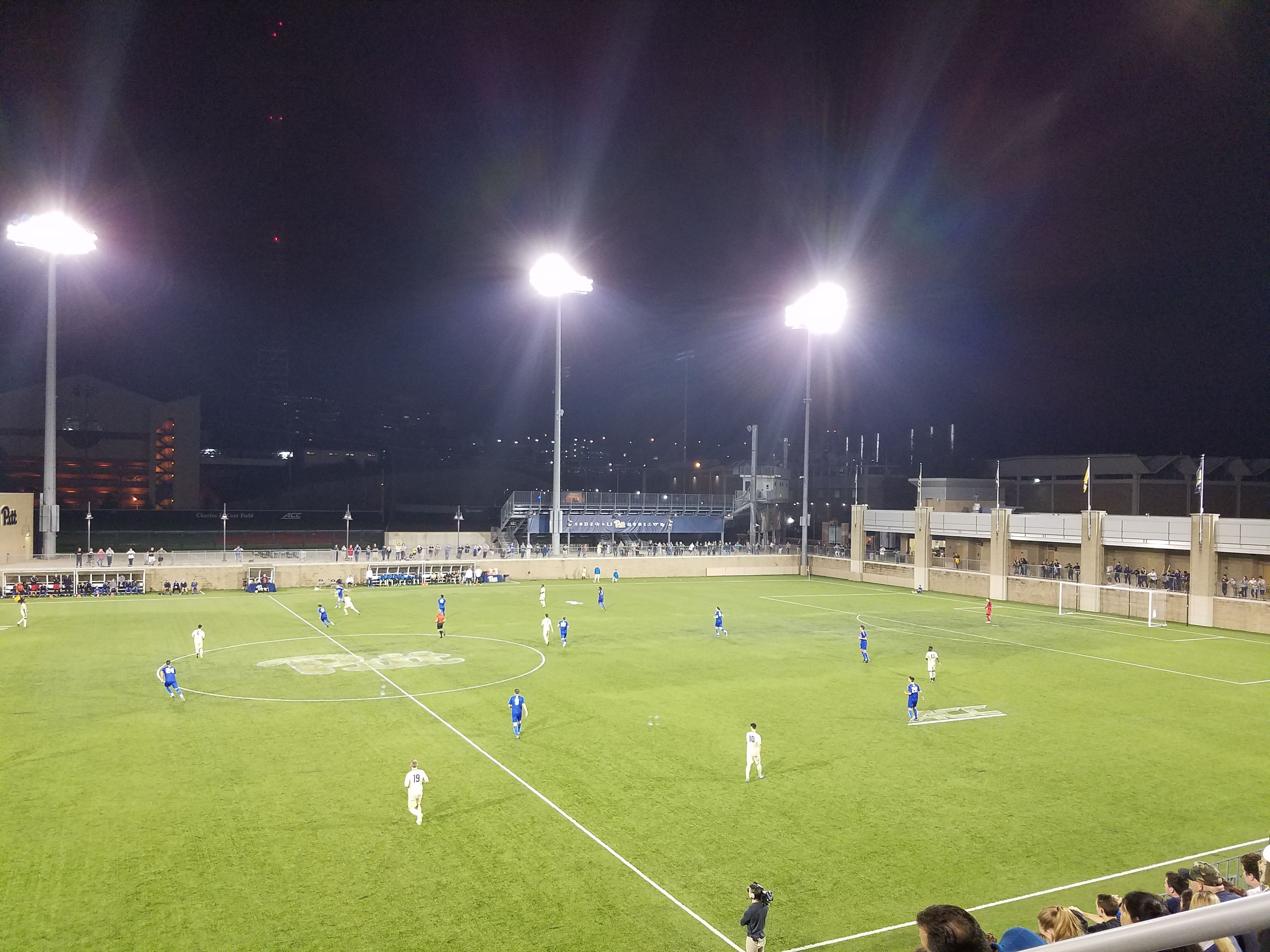
Ambrose Urbanic Field, soccer stadium, in 2017

The men's and women's soccer facility includes the 735-seat Ambrose Urbanic Field. Used for both practice and competition, the facility includes lighting and a press box.

The soccer pitch uses the FIFA-certified "Duraspine" version of FieldTurf as found in Gillette Stadium and Lumen Field.

The first game held at the soccer facility was an exhibition played by the men's team against the Pittsburgh Riverhounds on March 20, 2011.

=== Charles L. Cost Field ===
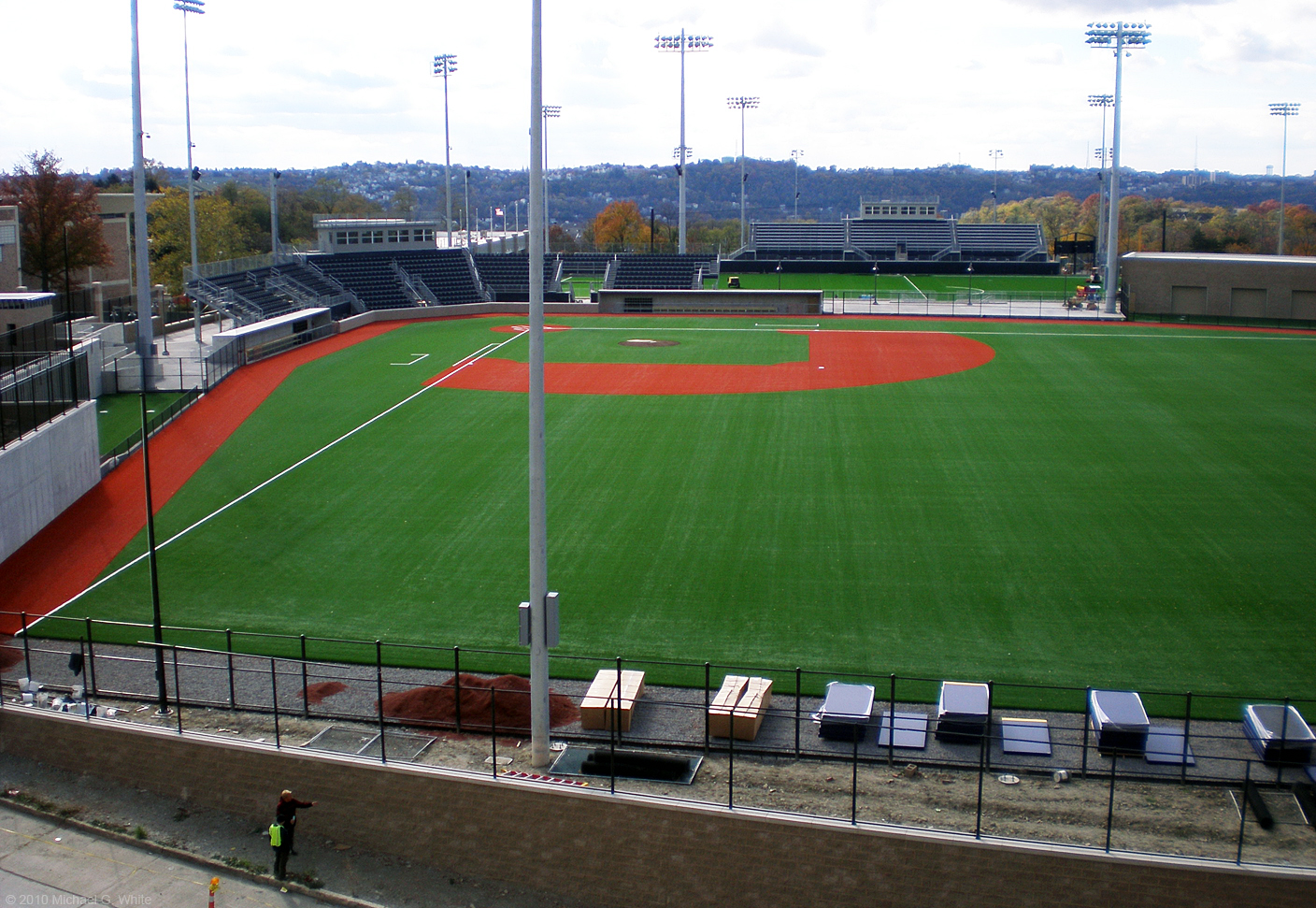
Charles L. Cost Field, baseball venue

The baseball facility includes the 900-seat Charles L. Cost Field, a press box, in-ground team dugouts, bullpens, and hitting and pitching practice areas. Field Turf synthetic grass is installed in both the infield and outfield to allow for play and practice throughout the year and lighting is installed for evening games. The field has 300-foot (91 m) base lines and 375-foot (114 m) power alleys, and is 405 feet (123 m) to center field. The field was named after three-sport letterman and former Pitt football running back Charles L. "Corky" Cost. The scoreboard was donated by Armand C. Dellovade.

The first game held at Cost Field was a 10–7 Pitt loss to Kent State on March 16, 2011. Pitt's first win at the facility was a 9–6 victory over Niagara on March 18, 2011.

=== Vartabedian Field ===
The softball facility includes the 600-seat Vartabedian Field, which features a skinned infield with an artificial grass outfield. The stadium includes team dugouts, hitting and pitching practice areas, lighting, and a press box. The first softball game played at Vartabedian Field was a 2–1 Pitt victory over Penn State on March 29, 2011. Vartabedian Field hosted the Atlantic Coast Conference softball tournament for the first time from May 11 to 14, 2022.

== See also ==
- List of NCAA Division I baseball venues

Preceded by Darragh Street Medical Student Housing	University of Pittsburgh buildings Petersen Sports Complex; Constructed: 2008-2011	Succeeded by Last construction
