= Pol Calvet =

Spanish footballer

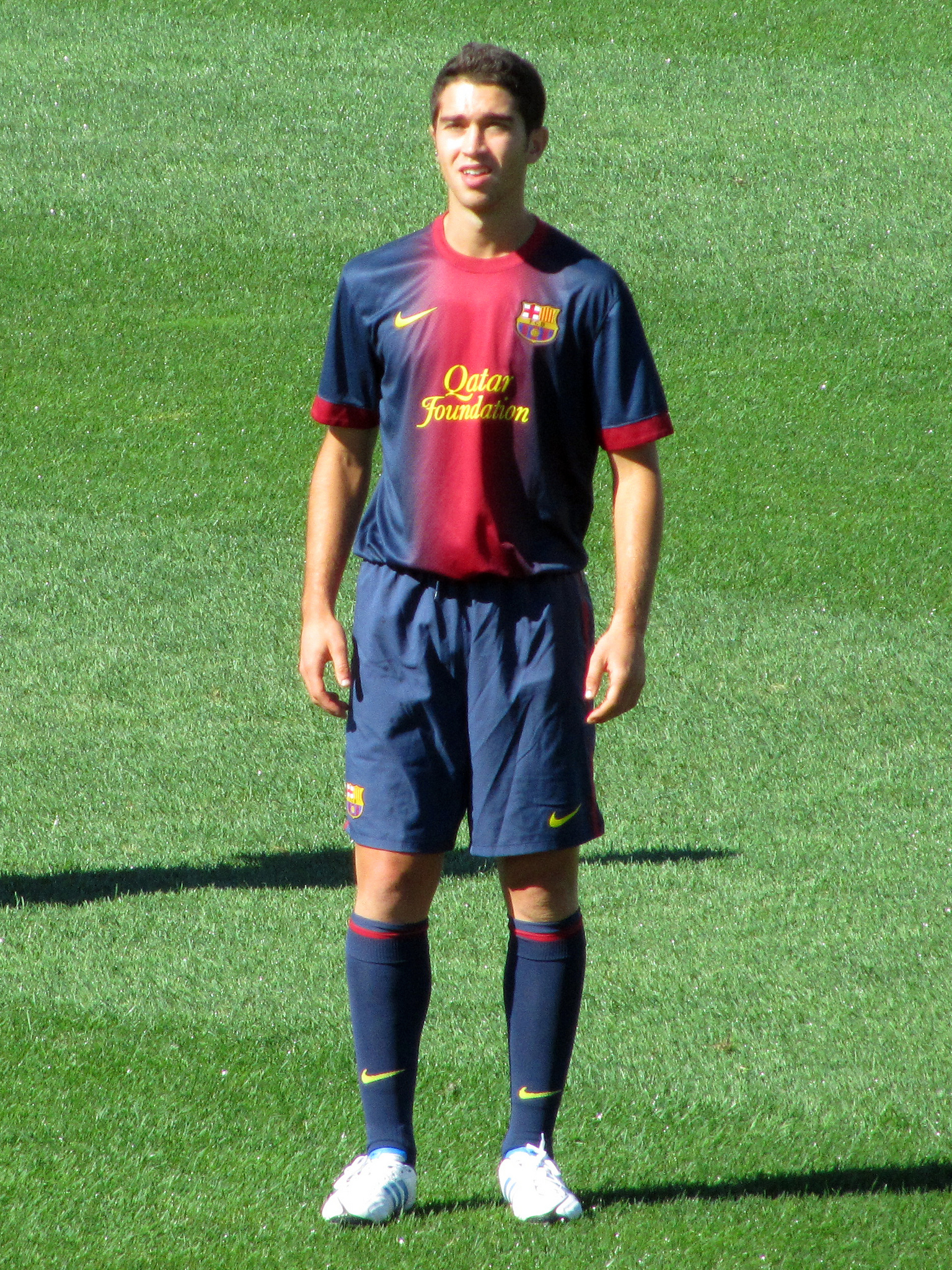
- Calvet with Barcelona B in 2012

Personal information
- Full name: Pol Calvet Planellas
- Date of birth: 19 April 1994 (age 32)
- Place of birth: Sant Cugat, Spain
- Height: 1.77 m (5 ft 10 in)
- Position: Midfielder

Youth career
- 2002–2007: Ferrán Martorell
- 2007–2008: Sant Andreu
- 2008–2013: Barcelona

College career
| Years | Team | Apps | (Gls) |
| 2017 | Pittsburgh Panthers | 14 | (1) |

Senior career*
| Years | Team | Apps | (Gls) |
| 2013–2016 | Barcelona B | 19 | (0) |
| 2016 | Deportivo B | 22 | (6) |
| 2016–2017 | Llagostera | 5 | (0) |
| Total | | 45 | (6) |

International career
| 2011 | Spain U17 | 4 | (1) |
- * Club domestic league appearances and goals as of 19 January 2018

Pol Calvet (born 19 April 1994) is a retired Spanish footballer who played as a central midfielder.

== Club career ==
Born in Sant Cugat del Vallès, Barcelona, Catalonia, Calvet joined FC Barcelona's youth setup in 2008, aged 14. He made his Barça B debut on 23 March 2013, coming on as a late substitute for the reserves in a 0–1 home loss against SD Huesca for the Segunda División championship.

On 10 June 2013, Calvet was definitely promoted to the B-side. He was handed his first start on 31 August, in a 1–0 home win against Real Zaragoza.

On 7 January 2016, he joined Galician team Deportivo de La Coruña from Barcelona B, initially signing for the B–team until June 2016, but with an option to renew and be promoted to the first team at the end of the season. After leaving Deportivo, Calvet joined Llagostera and went on to make four appearances with the club.

In 2017 Calvet decided to play college soccer in the United States at the University of Pittsburgh. Following one year of college soccer, Calvet was selected by Los Angeles FC with the twenty fourth pick of the second round of the 2018 MLS SuperDraft but he was never offered a contract by the club.

On 11 November 2018, Calvert announced his retirement from football at the age of 24.
