= Leo Bemis =

American soccer coach (1918–2007)

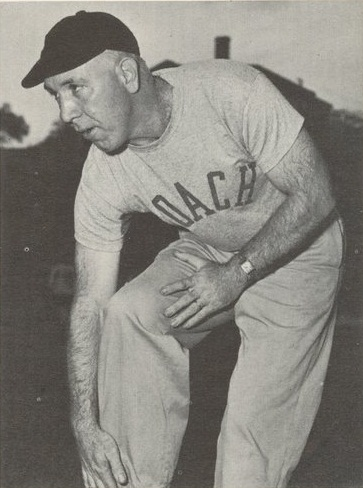
Bemis from 1956 Owl

Leo Bemis (December 26, 1918 – September 29, 2007) was an American collegiate soccer coach. He was notable for serving as the University of Pittsburgh's head men's soccer coach from 1954 to 1983, a career spanning 30 years. He guided the Panthers to 155 career victories, making him the second winningest coach in school history. He is a 1941 graduate from Edinboro University of Pennsylvania, and a 1989 inductee into the school's athletic hall of fame. He received his master's degree in physical education from Pitt in 1947.
