= Cost Sports Center =

Sports complex at the University of Pittsburgh

Coordinates: 40°26′47″N 79°57′54″W

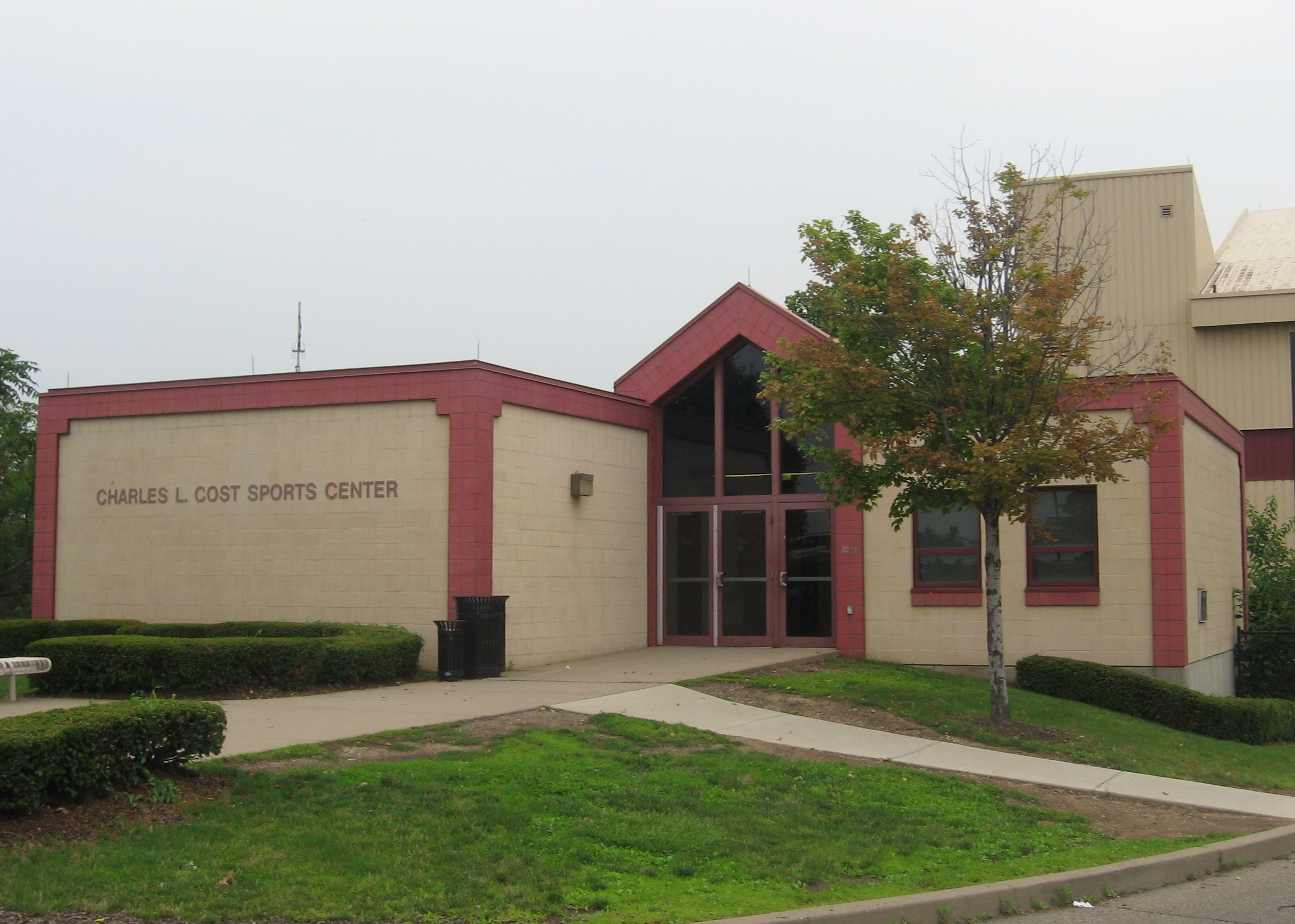
Entrance to the Charles L. Cost Sport Center at the University of Pittsburgh

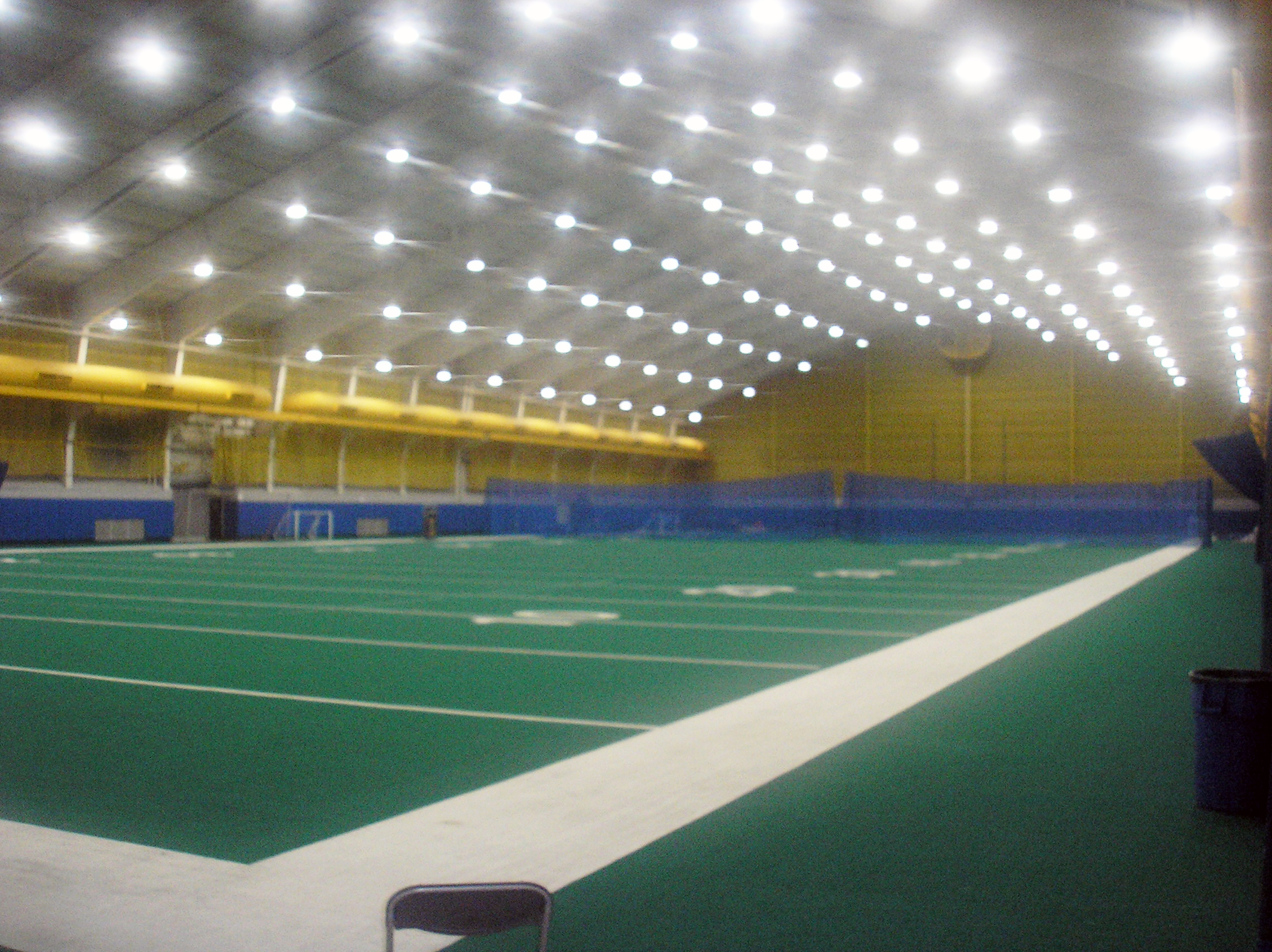
Indoor football field inside the Cost Center

The Charles L. Cost Sports Center is a multi-purpose indoor sports complex at the University of Pittsburgh and located at its upper campus area above and behind the Petersen Events Center in Pittsburgh, Pennsylvania. The Cost Sports Center sits on top of the seven-story University's Tower View Parking garage directly above Pitt's Trees Field, the university's former baseball and softball facilities as well as the school's intramural fields. The fields, planned to be converted into a new track and field complex, can be reached via elevator from within the Cost Sports Center.

Designed by architectural firm Celli, Flynn, and Associates, ground was broken on February 9, 1989 and the Cost Sports Center opened in 1990 at a cost of $3.5 million ($9.1 million today). The facility was named after three-sport letterman and former Pitt football running back Charles L. "Corky" Cost who donated an excess of $1 million ($2.7 million today) for its construction.

== Description ==
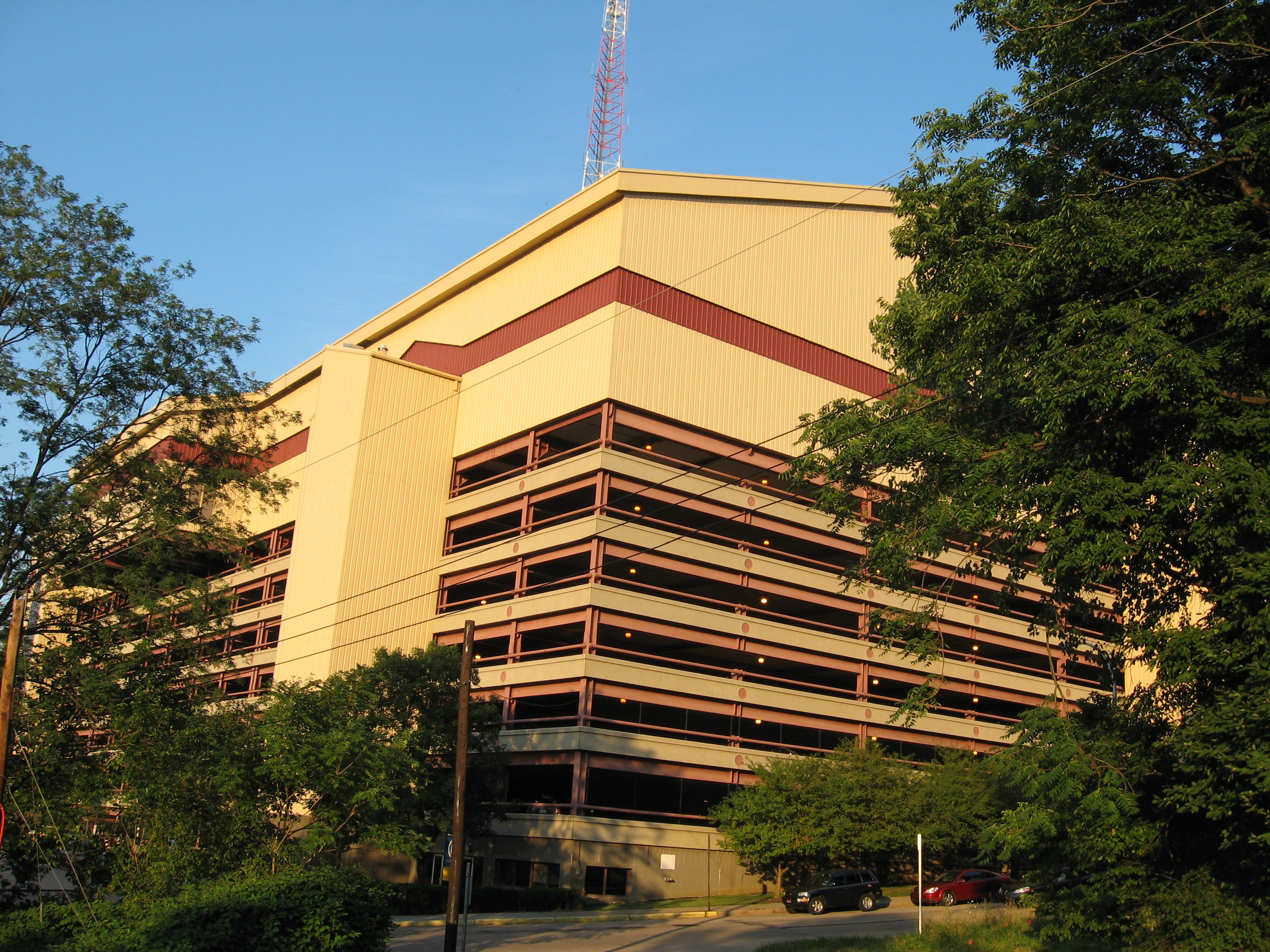
The Cost Sports Center sits on top of the university's Tower View Garage

Cost Sports Center is 62 feet (19 m) high and houses a regulation football field that can be converted into nine tennis courts or four indoor soccer fields. It features locker room facilities and a catwalk for filming or viewing practices. Originally the primary indoor practice facility for the University's football team, since 2000 the football program has taken up primary residence at the UPMC Sports Performance Complex on Pittsburgh's South Side just across the Monongahela River from Pitt's campus. Prior to the opening of the UPMC Sports Performance Complex, the Cost Sports Center was also occasionally used by the Pittsburgh Steelers as an indoor practice facility. The Cost Center currently serves as an indoor practice facility for the Panthers' varsity baseball, softball, soccer, and track and field teams during inclement weather. It also is the site of the annual Blue and Gold inter-squad track and field meet. The baseball team has utilized it for workouts, batting practice, and to host winter Diamond Baseball Clinics, but has moved some activities into its new facilities across the street at the Petersen Sports Complex. The Cost Sports Center is also used by other varsity and club sports, as well as for intramural activities.

== Injury ==
On March 23, 1996, Pitt wide receiver Demale Stanley of Belle Glade, Florida crashed into a padded cement wall at the Cost Center resulting in a broken neck and quadriplegia. The incident resulted in an out-of-court settlement between Stanley and the university. Pitt's football team presents an annual Demale Stanley Award for Courage to an inspiring player.

== Notable events ==
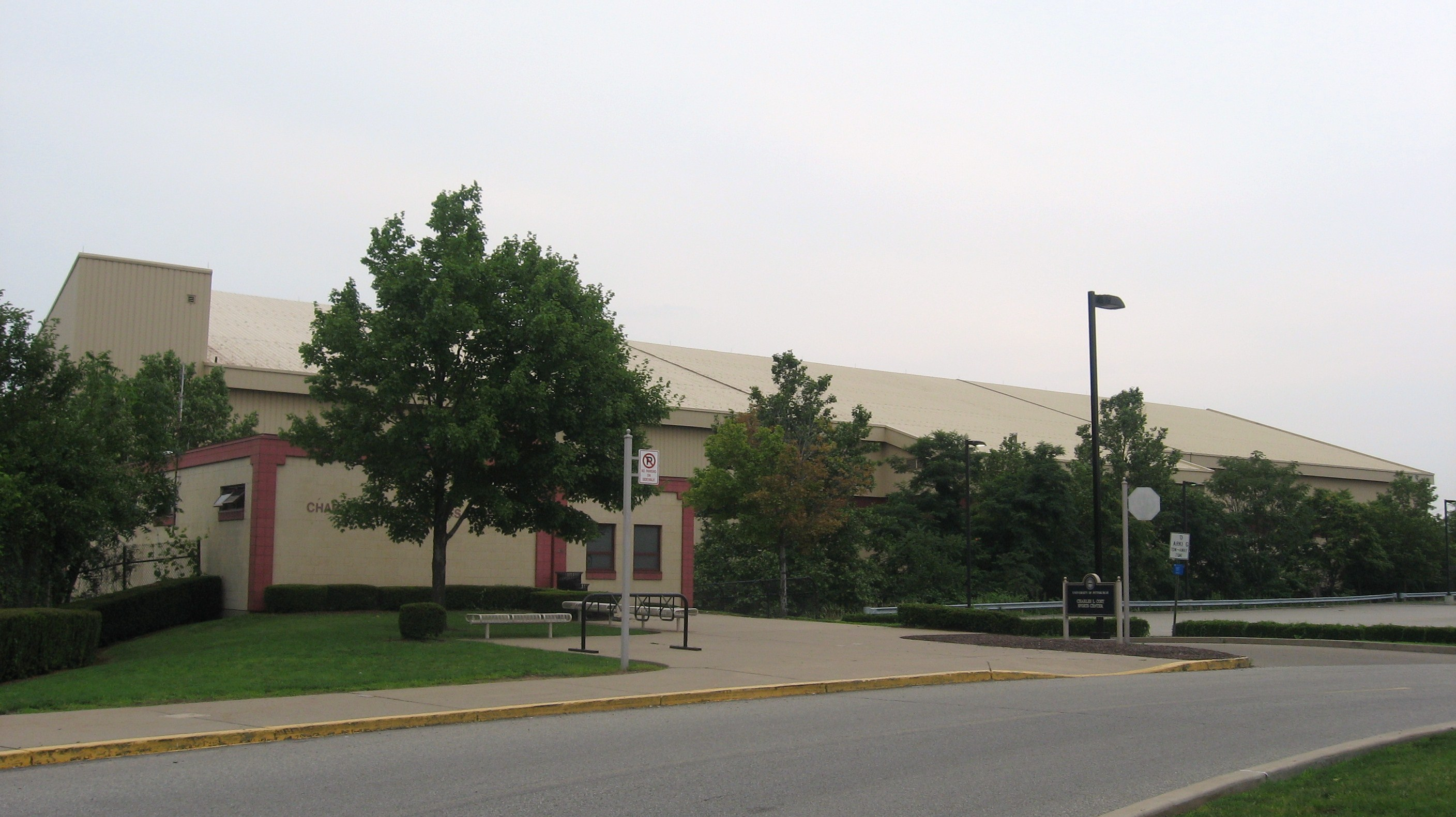

2005 Senior Olympics (badminton and volleyball)

Preceded by Mervis Hall	University of Pittsburgh buildings Cost Sports Center; Constructed: 1990	Succeeded by Sutherland Hall
