= Upper campus residence halls (University of Pittsburgh) =

US student accommodation

Coordinates: 40.445526°N 79.962574°W

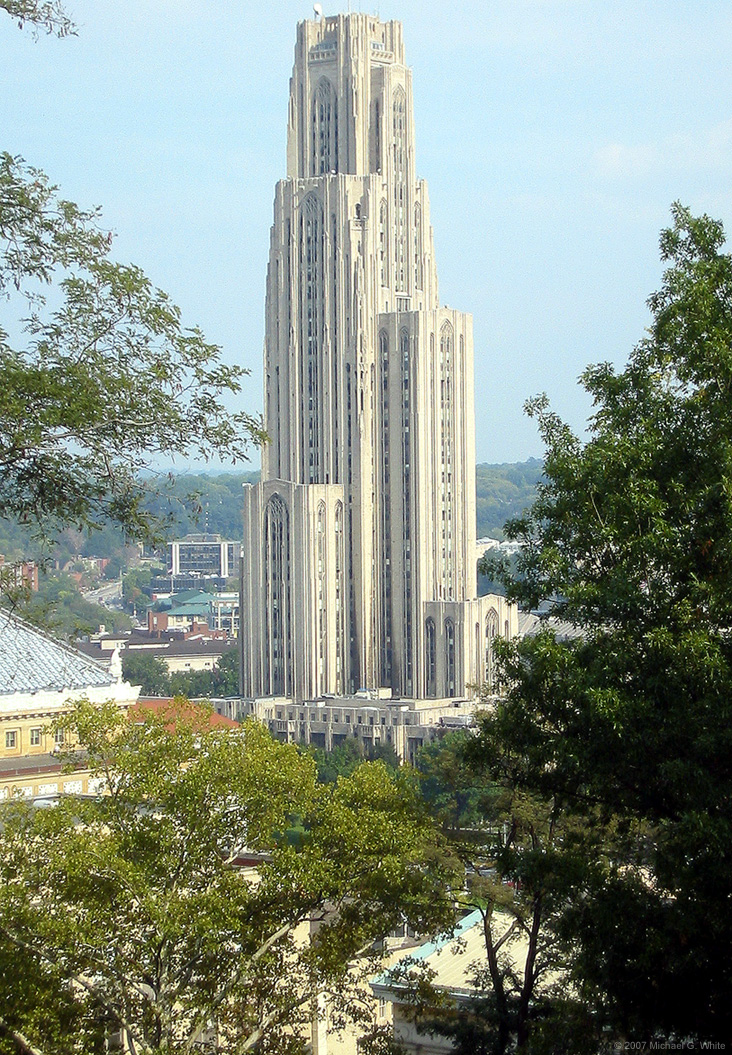
The upper campus provides dramatic views of the lower campus, including the Cathedral of Learning, seen here from a location near K. Leroy Irvis Hall.

The upper campus residence halls at the University of Pittsburgh include Sutherland Hall, Panther Hall, K. Leroy Irvis Hall, the fraternity housing complex, and the Darragh Street Apartments. Among the newest residence facilities at the university, these buildings reside on the upper campus located near many of the school's athletic facilities. The upper campus resides approximately 200 feet (61 m) above the lower campus that lies along Forbes and Fifth Avenues, providing dramatic views along the hilltop and slopes. Planning for upper campus student housing originated in the late 1960s and early 1970s, but stalled due to community and political opposition until the early 1990s with the opening of Sutherland Hall, the first major student residence constructed by Pitt in 29 years.

== Sutherland Hall ==
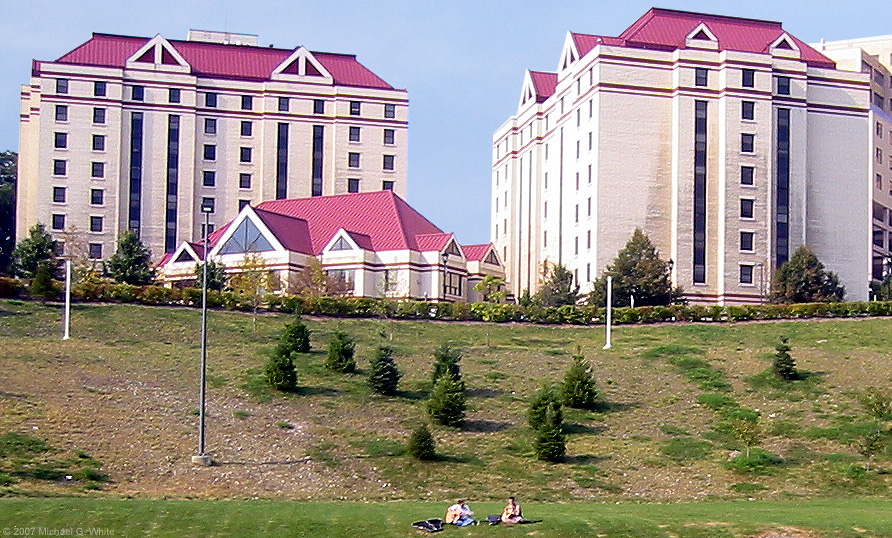
View of Sutherland Hall at the University of Pittsburgh from the Petersen Events Center prior to the construction of Panther Hall

Sutherland Hall is a residence hall of the University of Pittsburgh and is located on the upper campus next to the major athletic facilities and the Petersen Events Center. The $24 million ($48.2 million in 2025 dollars) structure opened in 1992. It is named for famed Pitt football coach Jock Sutherland.

=== Accommodations ===
Sutherland Hall, providing a view of the entire University (minus much of lower campus, which is shielded by Panther Hall and K. Leroy Irvis Hall), houses 739 students, a majority of which are first-year students as well some of the sports teams, such as the football team. It comprises a ten-floor West wing and an eight-floor East wing, adjoined by a commons building. The air-conditioned rooms are mostly doubles with semi-private baths, but there are also 6 and 8 person suites. There are two identical lounges on each floor; one is typically used as a TV lounge while the other is typically used as a study room.

The East and West wings of Sutherland Hall share a commons area complete with The Perch (a small dining hall), The Market at Sutherland (a small convenience store), multiple small lounges, and a student mail center. There is a laundry facility and lobby area with a TV on the ground floor of each wing. The East wing also has a small gym while the West wing has a kitchen and a recreation room complete with a ping pong table. The University of Pittsburgh Transportation System includes two Upper Campus shuttles with stops in front of Sutherland Hall.

=== Living Learning Communities ===
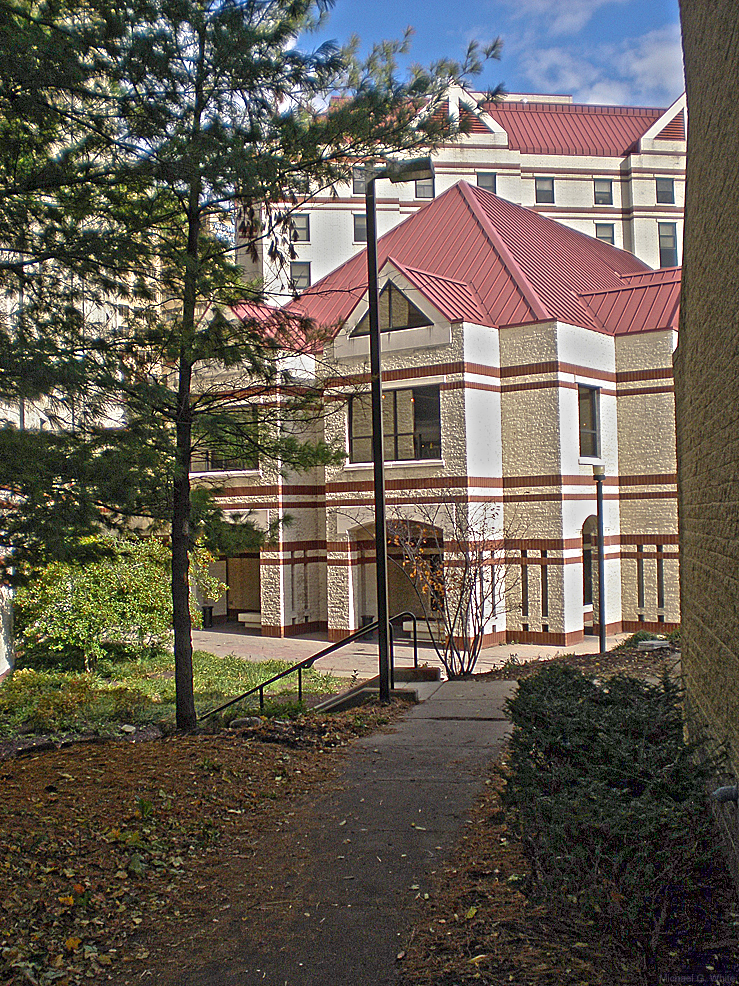
Sutherland Hall commons building

The Healthy Living Living Learning Community and the University Honors College program for first-year men and women are located in Sutherland Hall. A resident director, an assistant hall director, a program coordinator, and 16 resident assistants are on staff. Previously, a Math and Physical Science Living Learning Community had been located in Sutherland.

In 2008, a $3.3 million renovation of The Perch, Sutherland Hall's main food service area which serves as the primary dining venue for students on Pitt’s upper campus, created an area similar to the Market Central dining area in Litchfield Towers and introducing made-to-order services inducing Red Hot Chef, Hilltop Grille, Mato's deli, and an ice cream and breakfast bar.

=== Sutherland Hall external links ===
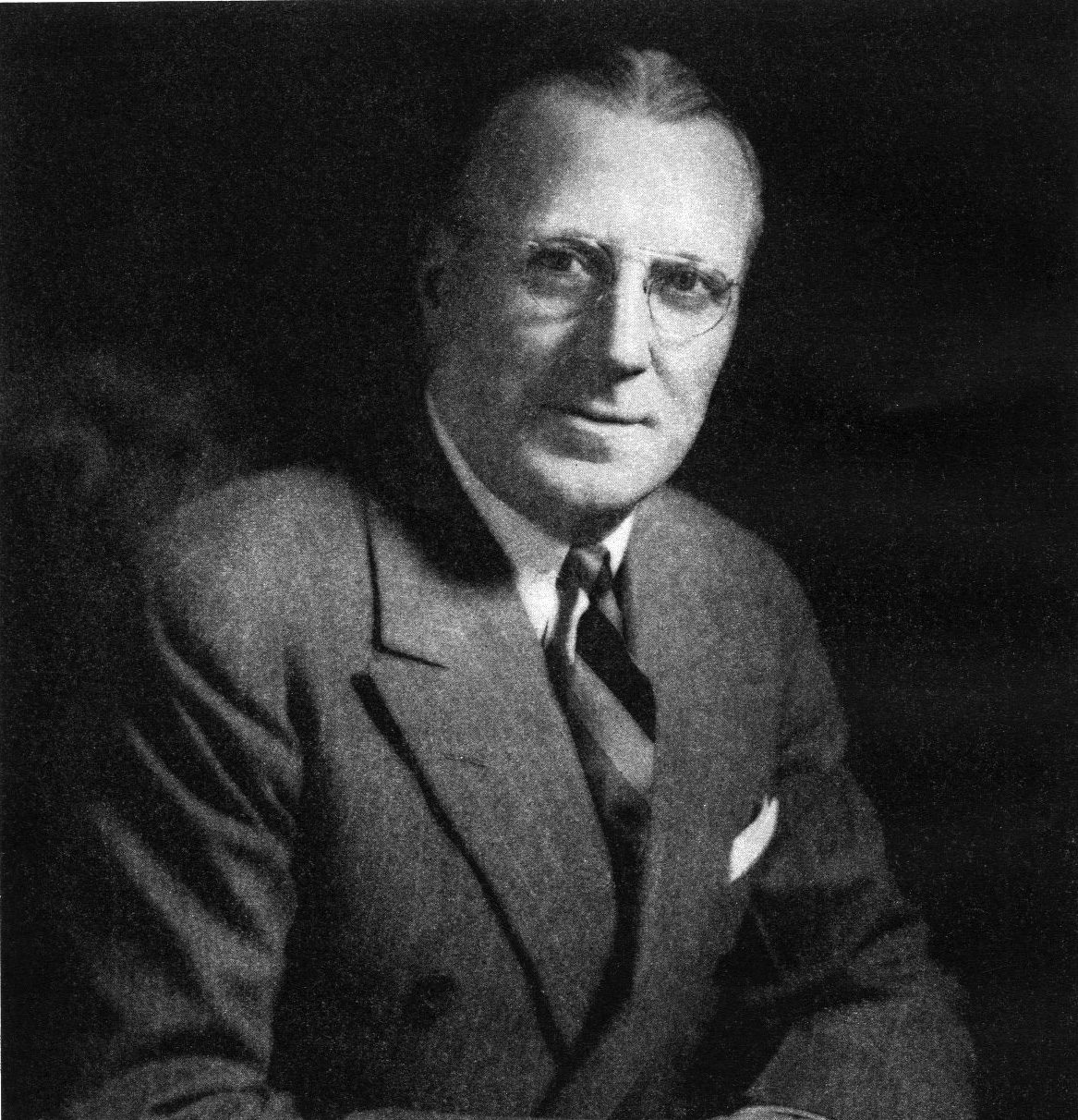
Jock Sutherland

- University of Pittsburgh Virtual Tour: Sutherland Hall
- Housing Services: Sutherland Hall
- Sutherland Hall Dining
- Sutherland Hall Disability Entrances
- Sutherland Hall Staff

Preceded by Cost Sports Center	University of Pittsburgh buildings Sutherland Hall; Constructed: 1992	Succeeded by Bouquet Gardens

== K. Leroy Irvis Hall ==
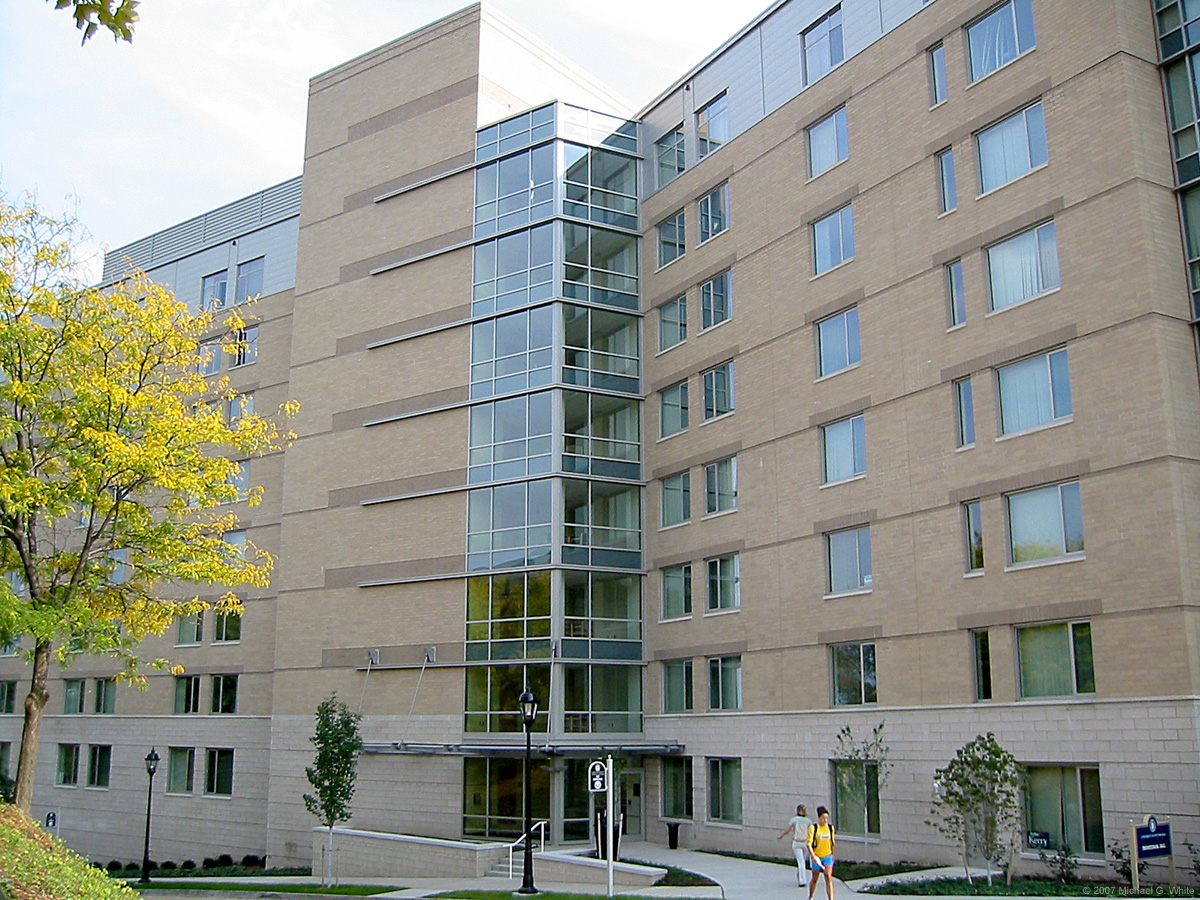
K. Leroy Irvis Hall, a residence hall at the University of Pittsburgh

K. Leroy Irvis Hall, formerly known as Pennsylvania Hall when opened in 2004, is one of the newest residence halls at the University of Pittsburgh. Designed by Perkins Eastman Architects, its construction cost $22.1 million. It is located on the upper campus adjacent to the Petersen Events Center, having nine floors and housing 420 men and women, primarily upperclass students, in air-conditioned four-person suites and doubles with private baths. An open lounge and laundry facilities are on every floor, and the commons area contains The Pennsylvania Perk coffee cart, a fitness center, a meeting room, and a student mail center.

K. Leroy Irvis Hall houses Living Learning Communities for the French Language and Culture, the Italian Language and Culture, Leadership, and Pre Law. A resident director, a program coordinator, and seven resident assistants are on staff.

K. Leroy Irvis Hall sits on the site of the former medical school building, called Pennsylvania Hall, constructed in 1910 (dedicated in January 1911) and demolished in late November 1998. It was one of only four buildings of the school's original acropolis campus plan to be constructed.

On June 30, 2017, the University passed a resolution to rename the residence hall from Pennsylvania Hall to K. Leroy Irvis Hall in honor of K. Leroy Irvis.

=== K. Leroy Irvis Hall external links ===
- K. Leroy Irvis Hall Overview
- K. Leroy Irvis Hall Panorama
- K. Leroy Irvis Hall on Pitt Virtual Tour
- K. Leroy Irvis Hall Disability Entrances

Preceded by Petersen Events Center	University of Pittsburgh buildings K. Leroy Irvis Hall; Constructed: 2004	Succeeded by Panther Hall

== Panther Hall ==
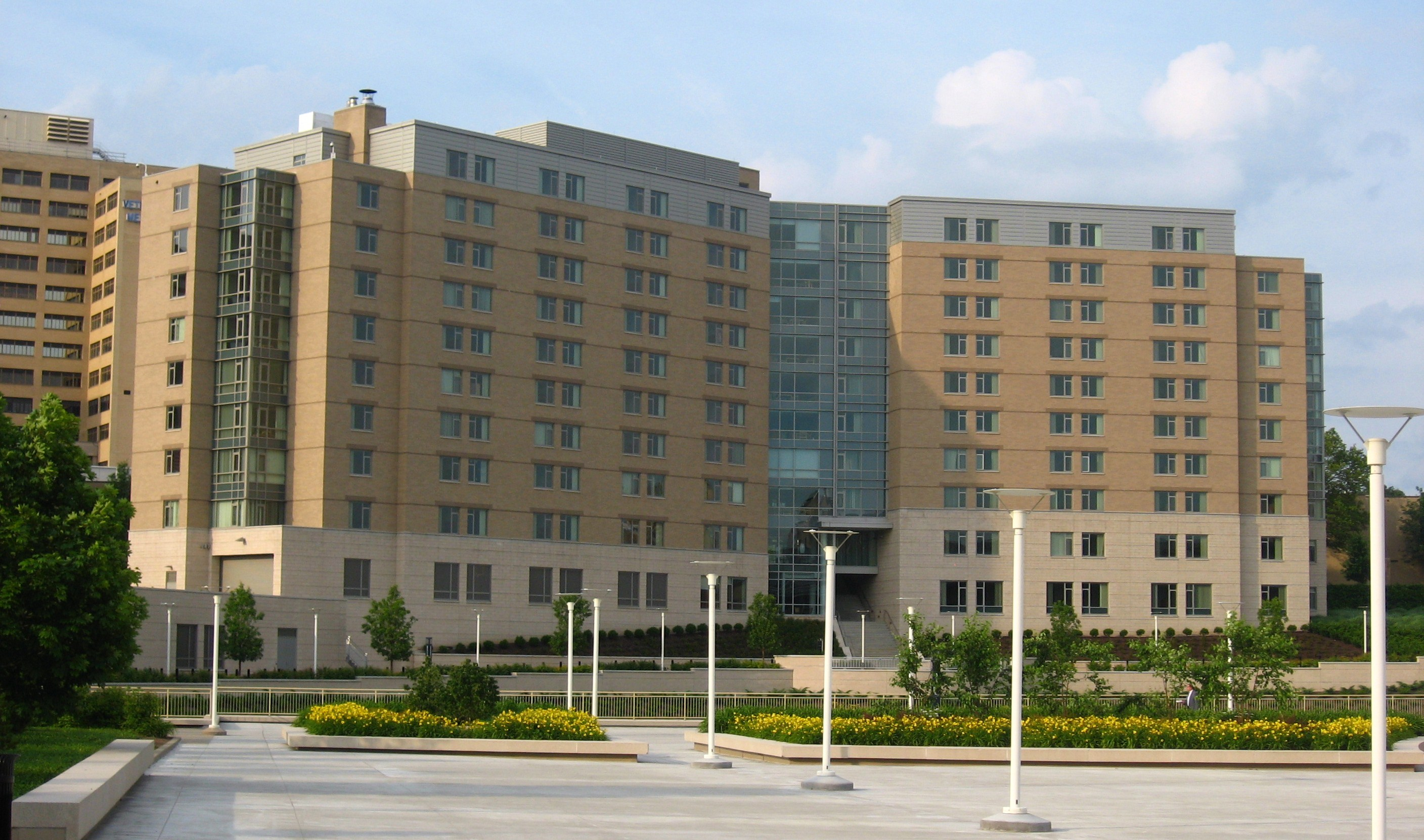
Panther Hall at the University of Pittsburgh

Panther Hall, opened in 2006, is one of the newest residence halls at the University of Pittsburgh. Designed by Perkins Eastman Architects, its construction cost $33.2 million. It is located on the upper campus adjacent to the Petersen Events Center and just west of K. Leroy Irvis Hall, it is ten-floors and houses 511 men and women, primarily upperclass students, in air-conditioned rooms that are a combination of three- and five-person suites, and doubles with private baths.

An open lounge, study area, and laundry facilities are on every floor, and the commons area contains a fitness center and a meeting room.

Panther Hall houses six Living Learning Communities: Civic Engagement and Community Service, the Entrepreneurial Experience, Natural Science Research, Social Science Research, Upper-class Engineering, and Multicultural Affairs. A resident director, a program coordinator, and ten resident assistants are on staff.

=== Panther Hall external links ===
- Panther Hall Overview
- Panther Hall Opening
- Panther Hall Disability Entrances

Preceded by K. Leroy Irvis Hall	University of Pittsburgh buildings Panther Hall; Constructed: 2006	Succeeded by Darragh Street Apartments

== Fraternity housing complex ==
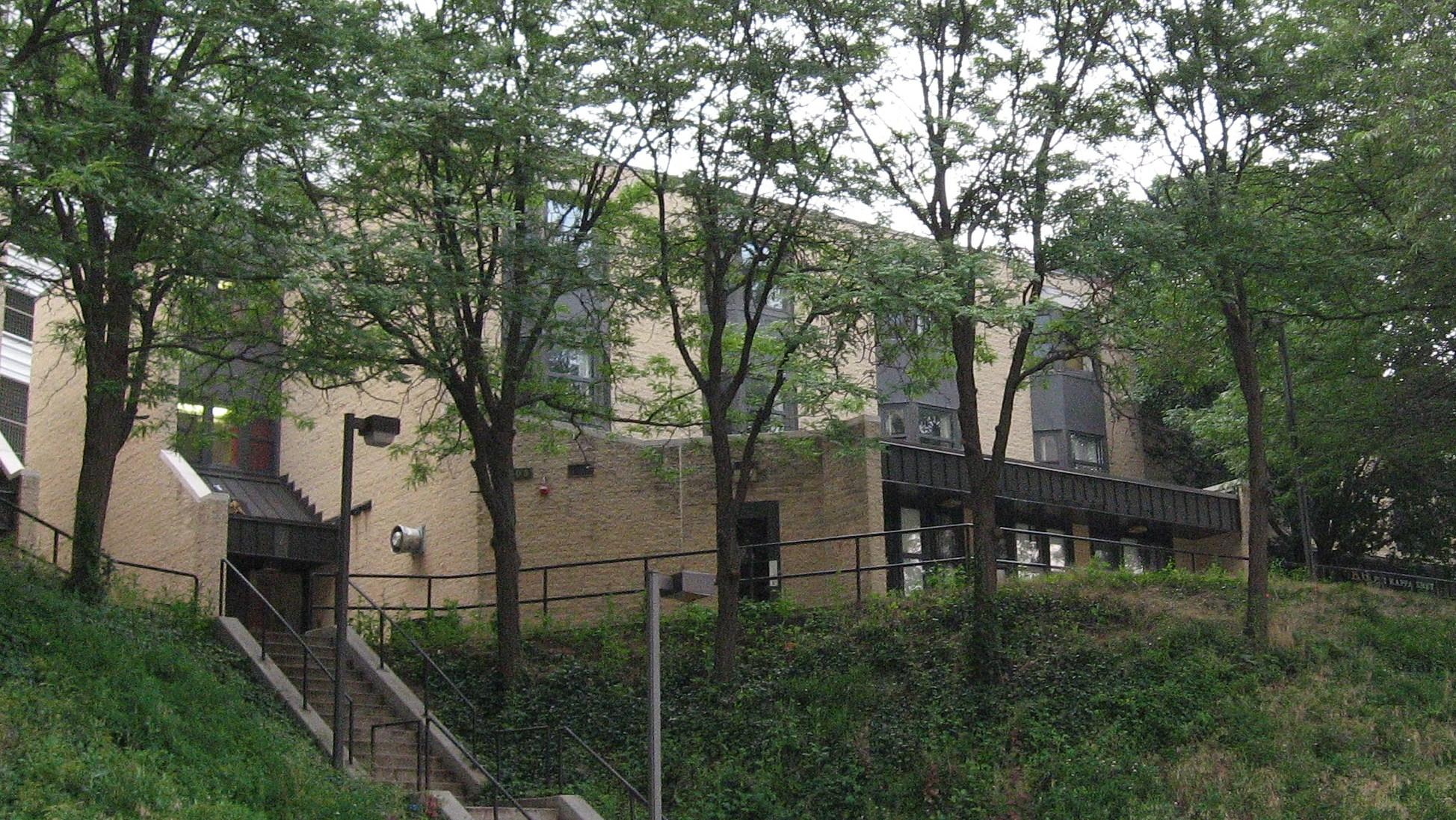
One of the on-campus fraternity housing complex units

The University of Pittsburgh's fraternities are located in both on- and off-campus housing. The fraternities with on-campus housing can be found on the hill near Sutherland Hall and between Panther Hall and the Falk School. Students commonly refer to the fraternity houses as “the hill houses.” The fraternity housing complex was constructed at a cost of approximately $450,000 ($1.45 million) for each of the eight units that opened in the fall of 1984. Each unit has an occupancy of 25 students. The original eight fraternities that occupied the complex were Delta Tau Delta, Sigma Chi, Phi Kappa Theta, Zeta Beta Tau, Pi Kappa Alpha, Theta Chi, Sigma Alpha Epsilon, and Delta Sigma Delta. Currently, seven of Pitt’s undergraduate fraternities occupy the buildings on the hill.

== Darragh Street Apartments ==
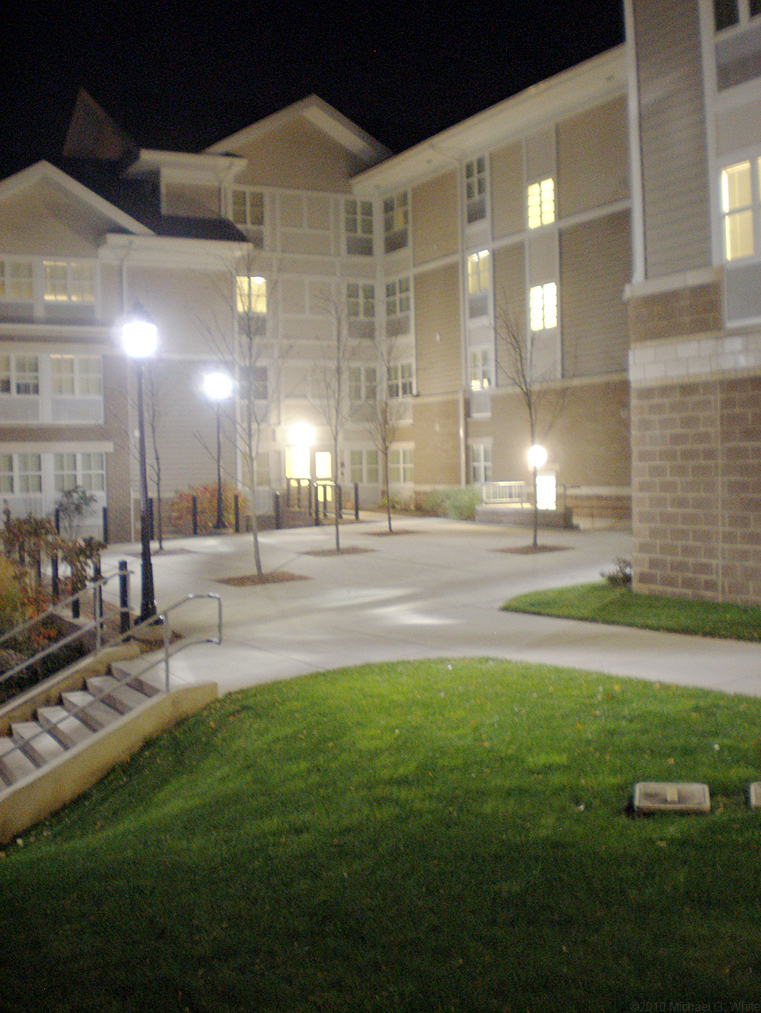
Darragh Street Apartments

The Darragh Street Apartments are an on-campus apartment complex consisting of four four-story buildings that provide preferred housing for Pitt's medical students adjacent to the medical school's Scaife Hall, Salk Hall, and the main hospitals of the University of Pittsburgh Medical Center. Designed by Renaissance 3 Architects, the housing complex totals 99,400 square feet (9,230 m^{2}) and contains 184 beds in one- and two-bedroom garden-style apartments. The complex was completed September 2007 for $18.2 million. The construction of the medical student housing on Darragh Street allowed the University to renovate Ruskin Hall, the former medical school residential complex, for undergraduate housing.

=== Darragh Street Apartments external links ===
- Darragh Street Apartments
- University Owned Apartments: Darragh Street Apartments

Preceded by Panther Hall	University of Pittsburgh buildings Darragh Street Apartments; Constructed: 2007	Succeeded by Petersen Sports Complex

== Gallery ==
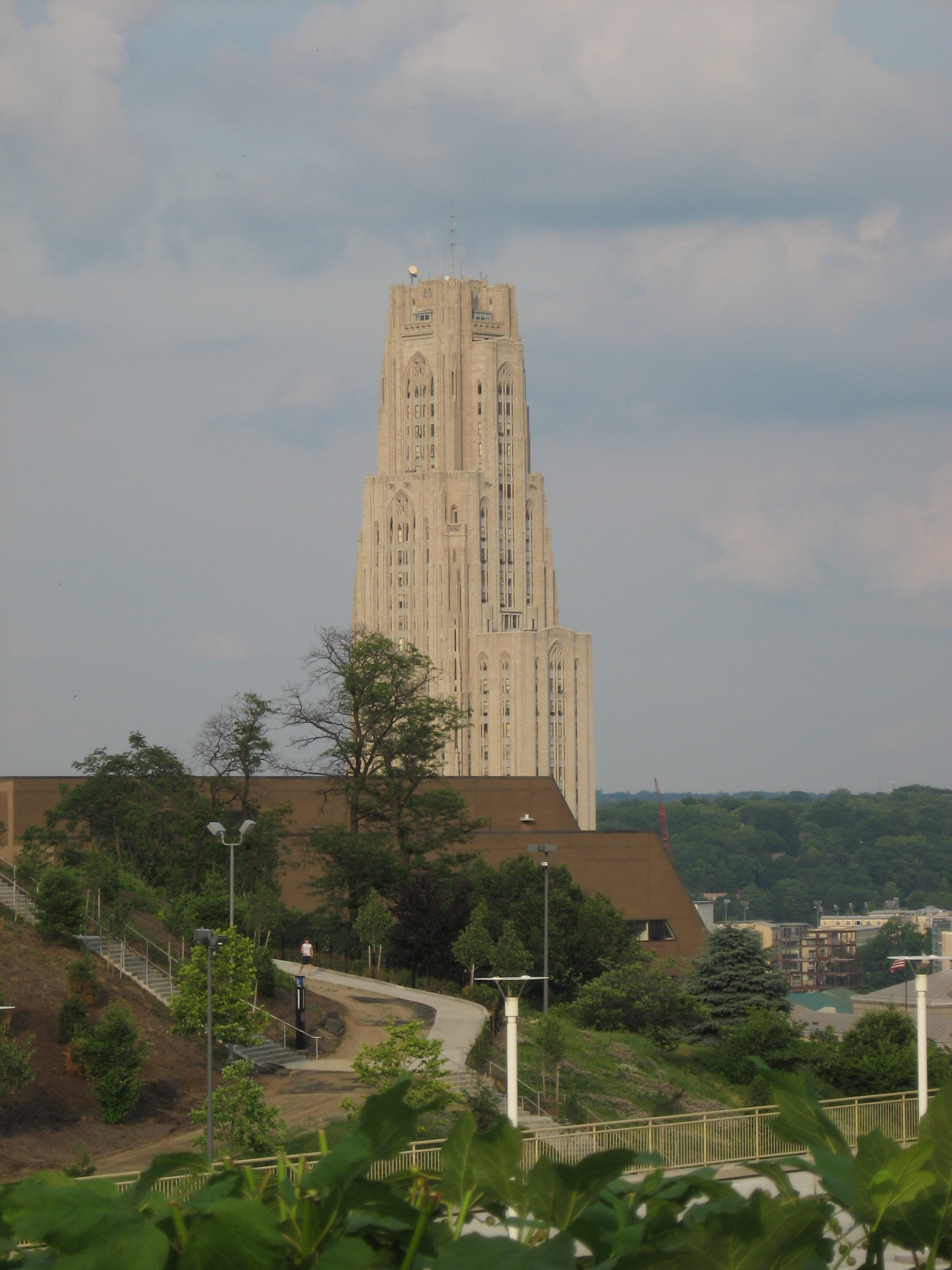
A view of the Cathedral of Learning from the upper campus

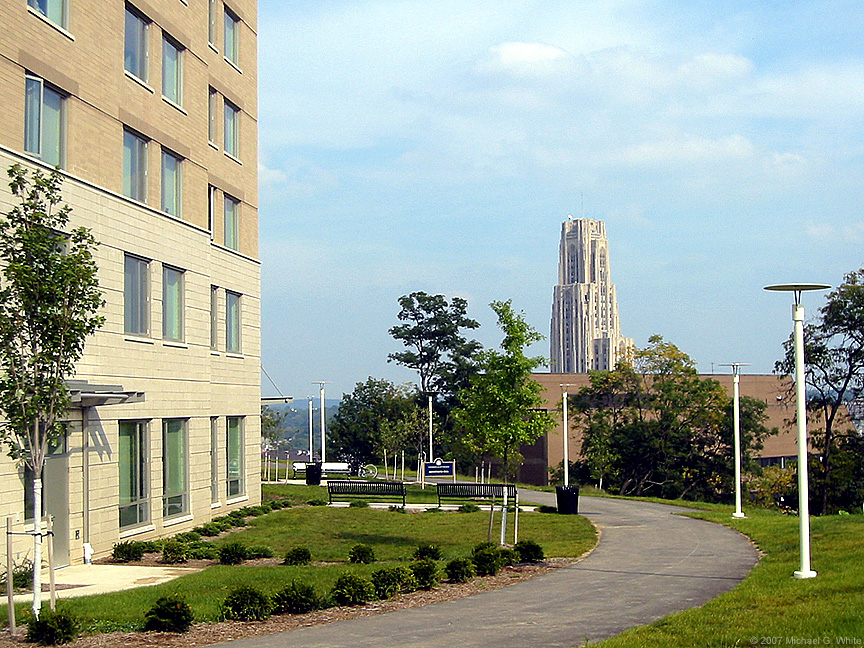
A view of the Cathedral of Learning from K. Leroy Irvis Hall

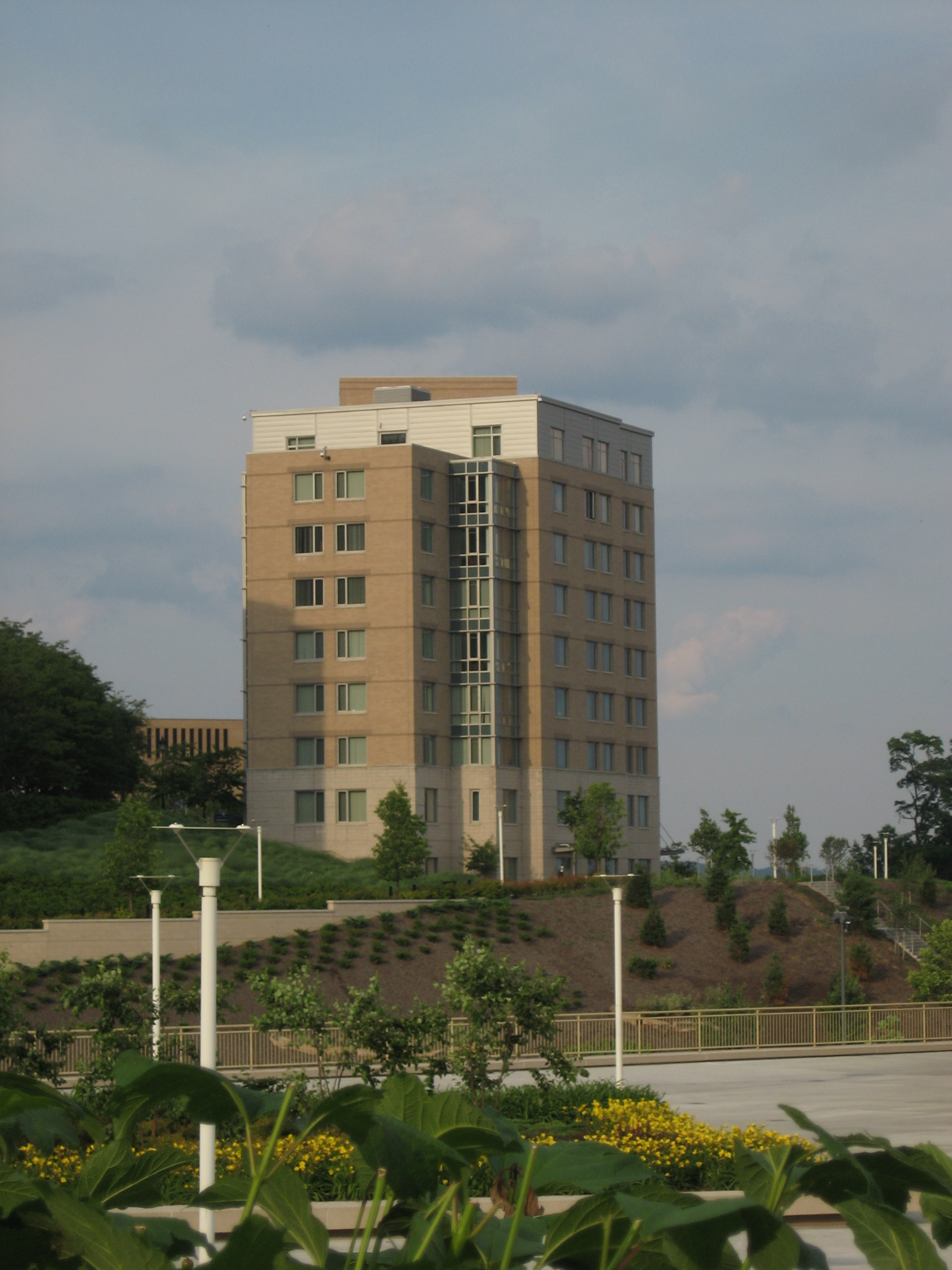
K. Leroy Irvis Hall

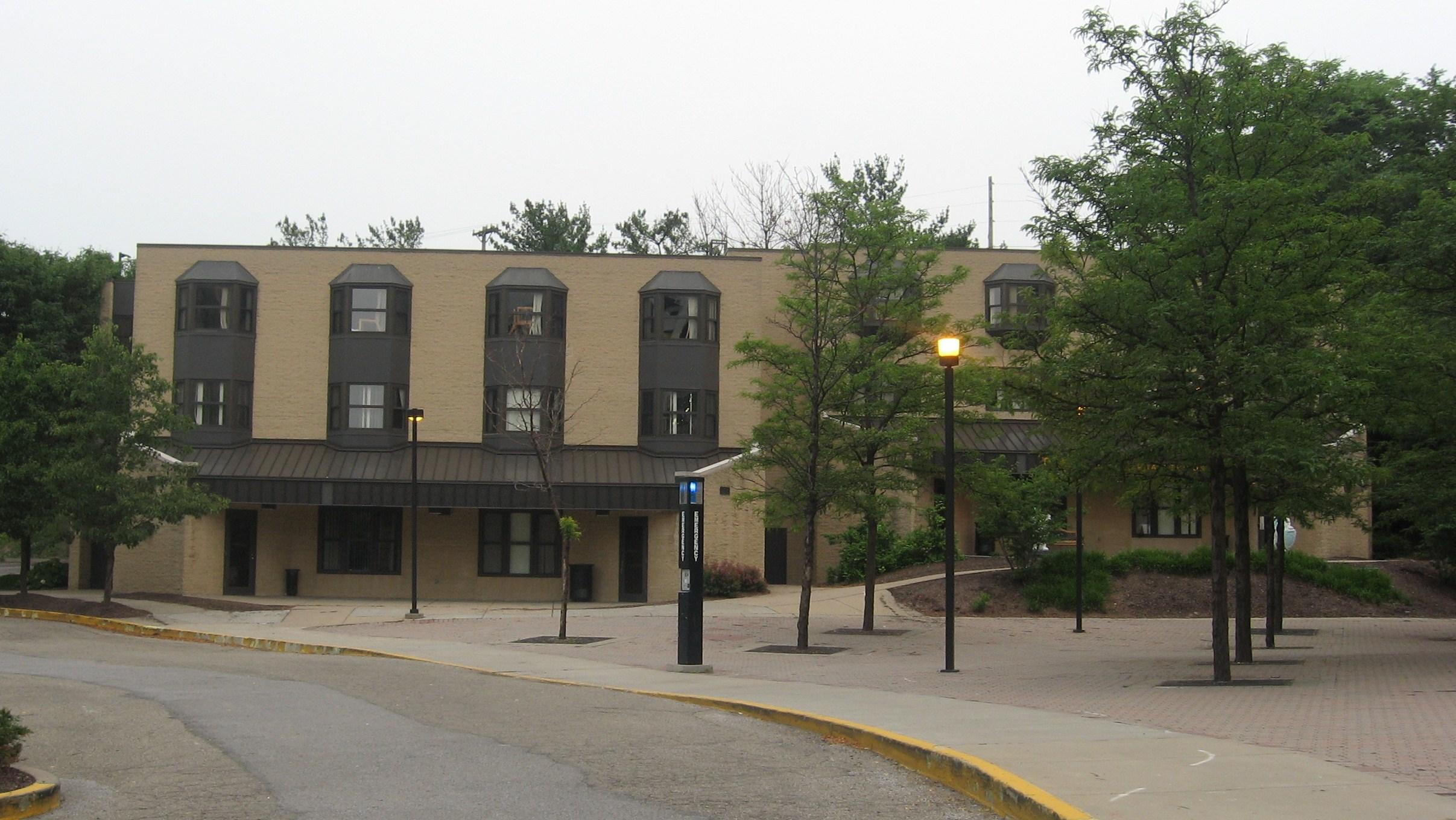
Fraternity complexes next to Sutherland Hall

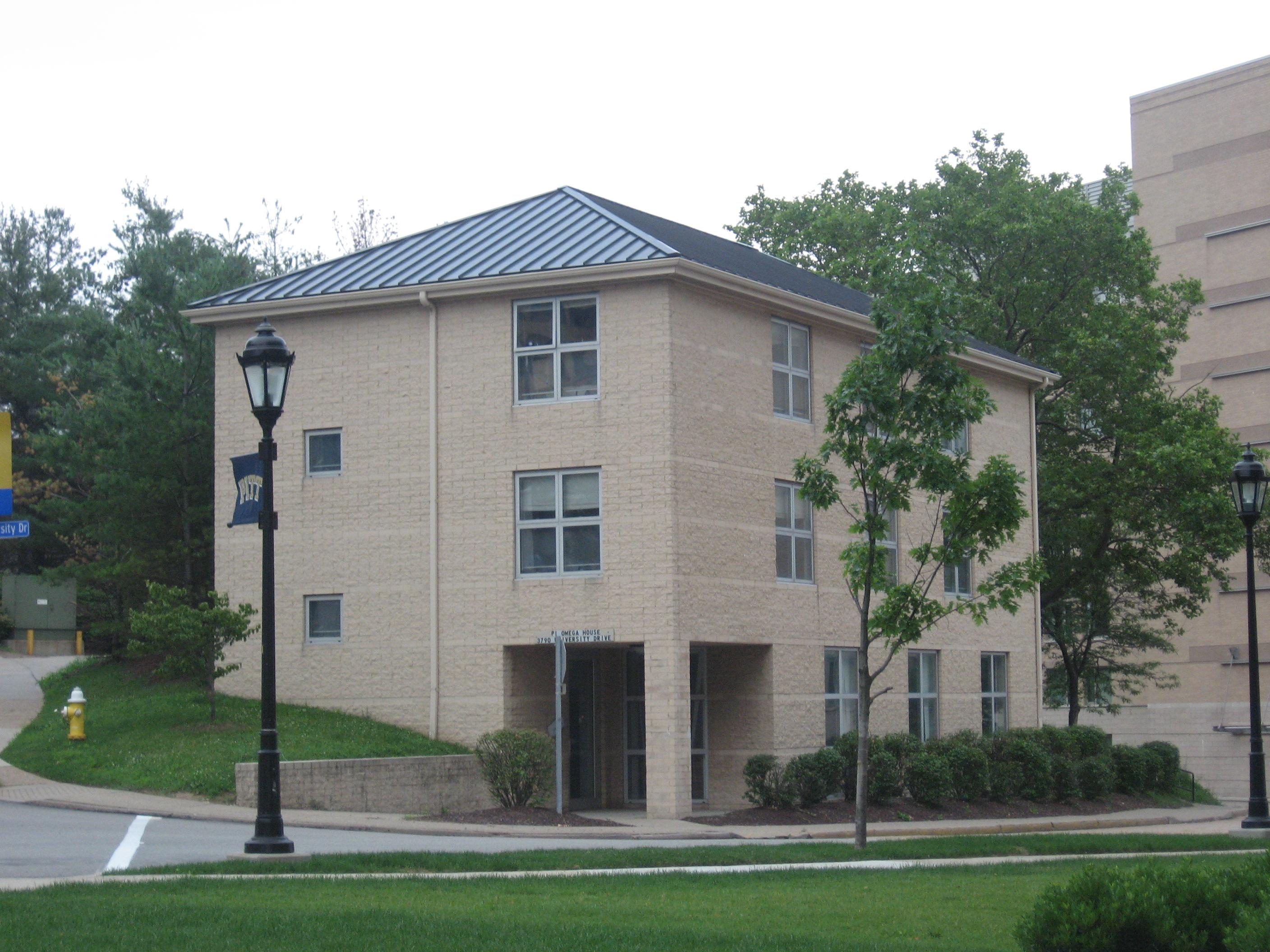
A newer fraternity house complex designated as Building 5
