= Jay Vidovich =

American soccer coach (born 1960)

Personal information
- Date of birth: February 2, 1960 (age 66)
- Place of birth: Detroit, Michigan, United States
- Positions: Midfielder; defender

College career
Years	Team	Apps	(Gls)
1978	Indiana Hoosiers		
1979–1981	Ohio Wesleyan Battling Bishops		

Managerial career
- 1982: Denver Pioneers (assistant)
- 1983: Regis Rangers (assistant)
- 1984–1985: Ohio Wesleyan Battling Bishops (assistant)
- 1986–1993: Wake Forest Demon Deacons (assistant)
- 1994–2014: Wake Forest Demon Deacons
- 2015: Portland Timbers 2
- 2016–: Pittsburgh Panthers

Jay Vidovich (born February 2, 1960) is an American soccer coach who is the head coach of the University of Pittsburgh men's soccer team. He is the former coach of the Portland Timbers 2 of USL Pro and formerly served as Wake Forest University's head soccer coach from 1994 to 2014, posting a 225–87–31 record during that span, including a 60–7–4 mark from 2012 through 2014. He was named the NCAA Men's Division 1 "Coach of the Year" by the National Soccer Coaches Association of America (NSCAA) in both 2007 and 2008. During those seasons, Wake Forest won the 2007 NCAA D1 Championship over Ohio State University and finished with a 22–2–1 record, and were ranked #1 for most of 2008, before falling in the Final Four to North Carolina. During the 2009 tournament, the Deamon Deacons fell to the eventual national champion Virginia Cavaliers.

His teams at Wake Forest finished in the Top 10 of the final rankings nine out of Vidovic's last 11 seasons, and won three ACC regular season championships. He was named ACC Men's Soccer Coach of the Year in 2002, 2004, 2006, 2008, & 2009. From 1986 to 1993, he had served as an assistant coach at Wake Forest.

On December 18, 2014, it was announced that Vidovich had been named as the head coach of the Portland Timbers 2 head coach of the USL Pro.

== Playing career ==
He played college soccer at Indiana University in 1978, before transferring to Ohio Wesleyan University. He played at OWU from 1980 to 1982, leading his team to the NCAA semifinals his senior campaign. He earned a bachelor's degree at Ohio Wesleyan in 1982, and later a master's degree at University of Denver in 1983 in Sports Sciences.
