= Kareem Ahmed =

Egyptian footballer (born 2007)

Personal information
- Full name: Kareem Sameh Mohamed Sami Ahmed
- Date of birth: 17 February 2007 (age 19)
- Place of birth: Egypt
- Height: 1.65 m (5 ft 5 in)
- Position: Forward

Team information
- Current team: Pittsburgh Panthers
- Number: 7

Youth career
- 2015–2026: Liverpool

College career
Years	Team	Apps	(Gls)
2026–	Pittsburgh Panthers	1	(0)

Kareem Sameh Mohamed Sami Ahmed (Arabic: كَرِيم سَامِح مُحَمَّد سَامِي أَحْمَد; born 17 February 2007) is an Egyptian footballer who plays as a forward for NCAA Division I team Pittsburgh Panthers.

== Club career ==
Born in Egypt, Ahmed's performances for a local amateur side caught the attention of Premier League sides Everton, Manchester City and Liverpool. He accepted an offer from the latter, stating that his decision was influenced by the fact that his idol, Mohamed Salah, played for Liverpool.

He joined Liverpool's academy, and would mark his debut for the under-18 team with a goal against Bournemouth in the FA Youth Cup - bundling the ball into the net after teammate Wellity Lucky's header was initially saved. On 23 July 2025, he signed his first professional contract with Liverpool and joined the club's U21 squad for the 2025–26 season.

He was released by Liverpool at the end of the 2025–26 season. He subsequently enrolled at the University of Pittsburgh, signing for the Pittsburgh Panthers men's soccer team.

== International career ==
In February 2022, Ahmed was called up to training camps with the Egyptian youth team.
